= 2017–18 FA WSL 1 =

Seventh season of the top English women's association football league

FA WSL 1
- Season: 2017–18
- Champions: Chelsea
- Champions League: Chelsea; Manchester City
- Matches: 90
- Goals: 282 (3.13 per match)
- Top goalscorer: Ellen White (15 goals)
- Biggest home win: Liverpool 8–0 Yeovil Town (6 January 2018)
- Biggest away win: Sunderland 0–6 Chelsea (30 September 2017)
- Highest scoring: Liverpool 8–0 Yeovil Town (6 January 2018)

The 2017–18 FA WSL 1 was the seventh edition of the FA WSL since it was formed in 2010. It was the first season of WSL which ran as a winter league. It started in September 2017 and ended in May 2018, with ten teams competing in both leagues.

The Football Association removed promotion and relegation between the two tiers for the end of the season. The league was instead restructured, with clubs required to apply for licenses under new criteria for the top tier in the 2018–19 season.

A one-off competition, the FA WSL Spring Series, ran from February to May 2017 to bridge the gap from the 2016 FA WSL season.

Ten teams competed this season. Following the closure of Notts County Ladies in April 2017, the FA announced that one place in the league would be given to a team which competed in the Spring Series, based on an evaluation by the FA of applicant clubs' business plans, budget, youth development, facilities and on-pitch performance. The place was subsequently given to Everton.

There was no relegation based on results at the end of the season due to the league's restructure.

== Teams ==
With the collapse of Notts County Ladies just prior to the Spring Series, the ten clubs of WSL 2 were invited to apply for a place in the 2017–18 season. Two sides, champions Everton and runners-up Doncaster Rovers, applied. On 9 June 2017, subject to appeal, Everton were awarded the position.

Locations of the 2017–18 WSL 1 teams

| Team | Location | Ground | Capacity | 2016 season | Spring Series |
|---|---|---|---|---|---|
| Arsenal | Borehamwood | Meadow Park | 4,502 | 3rd | 3rd |
| Birmingham City | Solihull | Damson Park | 3,050 | 5th | 7th |
| Bristol City | Filton | Stoke Gifford Stadium | 1,500 | 2nd, WSL 2 | 8th |
| Chelsea | Kingston upon Thames | Kingsmeadow | 4,850 | 2nd | 1st |
| Everton | Widnes | Select Security Stadium | 13,350 | 3rd, WSL 2 | 1st, WSL2 |
| Liverpool | Widnes | Select Security Stadium | 13,350 | 4th | 4th |
| Manchester City | Manchester | Academy Stadium | 7,000 | 1st | 2nd |
| Reading | High Wycombe | Adams Park | 9,617 | 8th | 6th |
| Sunderland | South Shields | Mariners Park | 3,000 | 7th | 5th |
| Yeovil Town | Yeovil | Huish Park | 9,565 | 1st, WSL 2 | 9th |

== Table ==
| Pos | Team | Pld | W | D | L | GF | GA | GD | Pts | Qualification |
|---|---|---|---|---|---|---|---|---|---|---|
| 1 | Chelsea (C) | 18 | 13 | 5 | 0 | 44 | 13 | +31 | 44 | Qualification for the Champions League knockout phase |
| 2 | Manchester City | 18 | 12 | 2 | 4 | 51 | 17 | +34 | 38 | Qualification for the Champions League knockout phase |
| 3 | Arsenal | 18 | 11 | 4 | 3 | 38 | 18 | +20 | 37 | |
| 4 | Reading | 18 | 9 | 5 | 4 | 40 | 18 | +22 | 32 | |
| 5 | Birmingham City | 18 | 9 | 3 | 6 | 30 | 18 | +12 | 30 | |
| 6 | Liverpool | 18 | 9 | 1 | 8 | 30 | 27 | +3 | 28 | |
| 7 | Sunderland (R) | 18 | 5 | 1 | 12 | 15 | 40 | −25 | 16 | Did not apply for a licence, Relegation to the FA Women's National League |
| 8 | Bristol City | 18 | 5 | 1 | 12 | 13 | 47 | −34 | 16 | |
| 9 | Everton | 18 | 4 | 2 | 12 | 19 | 30 | −11 | 14 | |
| 10 | Yeovil Town | 18 | 0 | 2 | 16 | 2 | 54 | −52 | 2 | |

Source: FA WSL
Rules for classification: 1) Points; 2) Goal difference; 3) Number of goals scored
(C) Champions; (R) Relegated

== Results ==
| Home \ Away | ARS | BIR | BRI | CHE | EVE | LIV | MCI | REA | SUN | YEO |
|---|---|---|---|---|---|---|---|---|---|---|
| Arsenal | — | 3–2 | 1–1 | 1–1 | 1–0 | 3–0 | 2–1 | 3–1 | 3–0 | 4–0 |
| Birmingham City | 3–0 | — | 2–0 | 0–2 | 2–1 | 4–0 | 2–0 | 1–1 | 2–0 | 3–0 |
| Bristol City | 1–6 | 0–2 | — | 0–2 | 2–1 | 0–2 | 1–6 | 0–5 | 1–2 | 1–0 |
| Chelsea | 3–2 | 2–1 | 6–0 | — | 1–0 | 1–0 | 0–0 | 2–2 | 2–1 | 6–0 |
| Everton | 0–2 | 0–3 | 1–2 | 0–1 | — | 0–2 | 2–3 | 2–1 | 5–1 | 3–1 |
| Liverpool | 0–3 | 1–0 | 2–0 | 2–3 | 1–1 | — | 1–0 | 0–3 | 3–1 | 8–0 |
| Manchester City | 5–2 | 3–1 | 4–0 | 2–2 | 3–0 | 4–0 | — | 0–2 | 3–0 | 5–0 |
| Reading | 0–0 | 2–2 | 4–0 | 2–2 | 3–0 | 3–0 | 2–5 | — | 0–1 | 3–0 |
| Sunderland | 0–2 | 3–0 | 1–2 | 0–6 | 1–1 | 1–4 | 0–3 | 0–2 | — | 2–1 |
| Yeovil Town | 0–0 | 0–0 | 0–2 | 0–2 | 0–2 | 0–4 | 0–4 | 0–4 | 0–1 | — |

Updated to match(es) played on 15 May 2018. Source: FA WSL
Legend: Blue = home team win; Yellow = draw; Red = away team win.

== Top goalscorers ==
As of 20 May 2018

| Rank | Player | Team | Goals |
|---|---|---|---|
| 1 | (England) Ellen White | Birmingham City | 15 |
| 2 | (England) Nikita Parris | Manchester City | 11 |
| 3 | Beth England | Liverpool | 10 |
| 4 | (England) Remi Allen | Reading | 9 |
| 4 | (England) Isobel Christiansen | Manchester City | 9 |
| 6 | (England) Brooke Chaplen | Reading | 8 |
| 6 | (England) Fran Kirby | Chelsea | 8 |
| 6 | (England) Beth Mead | Arsenal | 8 |

== Awards ==
=== Annual awards ===
| Award | Winner | Club |
|---|---|---|
| FA WSL Head Coach of the Year | (England) Emma Hayes | Chelsea |
| FA WSL 1 Players' Player of the Year | (Scotland) Jill Scott / (Germany) Ann-Katrin Berger | Manchester City / Birmingham City |
| FA WSL 1 Save of the Season | (England) Sophie Baggaley | Bristol City |
| FA WSL 1 Top Goalscorer | (England) Ellen White | Birmingham City |
| PFA Women's Players' Player of the Year | (England) Fran Kirby | Chelsea |
| PFA Women's Young Player of the Year | (England) Lauren Hemp | Bristol City |
| FWA Women's Footballer of the Year | (England) Fran Kirby | Chelsea |

PFA Team of the Year
| Goalkeeper | (Germany) Ann-Katrin Berger (Birmingham City) | | | |
| Defenders | (England) Hannah Blundell (Chelsea) | (England) Millie Bright (Chelsea) | (England) Aoife Mannion (Birmingham City) | (England) Demi Stokes (Manchester City) |
| Midfielders | (England) Fara Williams (Reading) | (South Korea) Ji So-yun (Chelsea) | (Norway) Maren Mjelde (Chelsea) | (England) Beth Mead (Arsenal) |
| Forwards | (England) Fran Kirby (Chelsea) | | (England) Ellen White (Birmingham City) | |

== See also ==
- 2017–18 FA WSL 2
- 2017–18 FA WSL Cup
