= 2022–23 Manchester City W.F.C. season =

Manchester City Women
2022–23 season
- Chairman: Khaldoon Mubarak
- Manager: Gareth Taylor
- Stadium: Academy Stadium
- Women's Super League: 4th
- FA Cup: Quarter-finals
- League Cup: Semi-finals
- UEFA Champions League: First qualifying round
- Top goalscorer: League: Khadija Shaw (20); All: Khadija Shaw (31)
- Highest home attendance: 44,259 (vs. Manchester United, 11 December 2022)
- Lowest home attendance: 1,696 (vs. Brighton & Hove Albion, 4 December 2022)
- Average home league attendance: 7,195
Home colours	Away colours	Third colours

The 2022–23 season was Manchester City Women's Football Club's 35th season of competitive football and their 10th season in the Women's Super League, the highest level of English women's football.

== Pre-season ==
28 July 2022 Friendly	Manchester City	4–2	Durham	Manchester
	Pullen; Fowler: Coombs	Report	Briggs; Robert	Stadium: Academy Stadium; Attendance: Behind-closed-doors

4 August 2022 Friendly	Manchester City	1–1	Sheffield United	Manchester
	Losada	Report	Enderby	Stadium: Academy Stadium; Attendance: Behind-closed-doors

11 August 2022 Friendly	Manchester City	3–1	Brighton & Hove Albion	Manchester
	Aleixandri; Raso; Marley-Paraskevas	Report	Goal	Stadium: Academy Stadium; Attendance: Behind-closed-doors

27 August 2022 Friendly	Manchester City	1–1	Liverpool	Manchester
	Castellanos	Report	Koivisto	Stadium: Academy Stadium; Attendance: Behind-closed-doors

== Competitions ==
=== Women's Super League ===
==== Results summary ====
Overall								Home						Away					
Pld	W	D	L	GF	GA	GD	Pts	W	D	L	GF	GA	GD	W	D	L	GF	GA	GD
22	15	2	5	50	25	+25	47	9	2	0	31	11	+20	6	0	5	19	14	+5

Last updated: 27 May 2023.
Source: FA WSL

==== Results by matchday ====
Round	1	2	3	4	5	6	7	8	9	10	11	12	13	14	15	16	17	18	19	20	21	22
Ground	A	A	H	A	H	A	A	H	H	A	H	A	H	H	A	H	A	H	H	A	A	H
Result	L	L	W	W	W	W	W	W	D	W	D	W	W	W	W	W	L	W	W	L	L	W
Position	7	10	8	6	4	4	4	4	4	4	4	4	3	3	3	2	4	2	2	3	4	4

A = Away; H = Home; W = Win; D = Draw; L = Loss

==== Results ====
11 September 2022	Manchester City	v	Arsenal	Manchester
19:00				Stadium: Academy Stadium
Note: The FA postponed all of the weekend's football fixtures following the death of Elizabeth II on 8 September 2022.

18 September 2022 1	Aston Villa	4–3	Manchester City	Aston
12:30	Lehmann 22'; Daly 32', 76'; Dali 58'	Report	Coombs 45+1', 55'; Shaw 53'; Raso (yellow card) 72'	Stadium: Villa Park; Attendance: 6,785; Referee: Louise Saunders

25 September 2022 2	Chelsea	2–0	Manchester City	Kingston upon Thames
16:00	Kirby 42'; Mjelde 78' (pen.)	Report	Ouahabi (yellow card) 52'	Stadium: Kingsmeadow; Attendance: 4,403; Referee: Abigail Byrne

16 October 2022 3	Manchester City	4–0	Leicester City	Manchester
14:00	Shaw 24', 79'; Greenwood (yellow card) 42'; Hemp 72'; Hasegawa 88'	Report	O'Brien (yellow card) 39'	Stadium: Academy Stadium; Attendance: 2,853; Referee: Farai Hallam

22 October 2022 4	Tottenham Hotspur	0–3	Manchester City	Leyton
11:30	Neville (yellow card) 45+5'	Report	Shaw 41', 47'; Kelly (yellow card) 55'; Hemp 76'	Stadium: Brisbane Road; Attendance: 1,888; Referee: Emily Heaslip

30 October 2022 5	Manchester City	2–1	Liverpool	Manchester
14:00	Shaw 21'; Raso 75'	Report	Stengel 33'	Stadium: Academy Stadium; Attendance: 4,002; Referee: Kirsty Dowle

6 November 2022 6	Reading	0–3	Manchester City	Reading
14:00	Vanhaevermaet (yellow card) 12'	Report	Mukandi 53' (o.g.), 60' (o.g.); Shaw 76'	Stadium: Madejski Stadium; Attendance: 1,911; Referee: Abigail Byrne

19 November 2022 7	Everton	1–2	Manchester City	Liverpool
15:00	Björn (yellow card) 35'; Sevecke 40'	Report	Blakstad 32'; Castellanos (yellow card) 38'; Shaw 49'; Kelly (yellow card) 87'	Stadium: Walton Hall Park; Attendance: 960; Referee: Emily Heaslip

4 December 2022 8	Manchester City	3–1	Brighton & Hove Albion	Manchester
14:00	Sarri 11' (o.g.); Blakstad 19'; Coombs 26'; Ouahabi (yellow card) 52'; Morgan (yellow card) 90+2'	Report	Sarri (yellow card) 33'; Lee 90+3'	Stadium: Academy Stadium; Attendance: 1,696; Referee: Cheryl Foster

11 December 2022 9	Manchester City	1–1	Manchester United	Manchester
12:30	Coombs 58'	Report	Galton 27'	Stadium: City of Manchester Stadium; Attendance: 44,259; Referee: Abigail Byrne

15 January 2023 10	West Ham United	0–1	Manchester City	Dagenham
18:45		Report	Shaw 50'; Ouahabi (yellow card) 74'	Stadium: Victoria Road; Attendance: 1,586; Referee: Amy Fearn

21 January 2023 11	Manchester City	1–1	Aston Villa	Manchester
11:30	Castellanos 28'	Report	Hanson 31'	Stadium: Academy Stadium; Attendance: 3,306; Referee: Cheryl Foster

4 February 2023 12	Leicester City	0–2	Manchester City	Leicester
11:30	Plumptre (yellow card) 52'	Report	Shaw 61'; Kelly 74'	Stadium: King Power Stadium; Attendance: 2,815; Referee: Amy Fearn

11 February 2023 13	Manchester City	2–1	Arsenal	Manchester
12:30	Hemp 4', (yellow card) 58'; Kelly 43'; Greenwood (yellow card) 56'	Report	McCabe (yellow card) 58'; Rafaelle 59'; Maritz (yellow card) 78'	Stadium: Academy Stadium; Attendance: 4,542; Referee: Rebecca Welch
Note: Rescheduled from 11 September 2022.

5 March 2023 14	Manchester City	3–1	Tottenham Hotspur	Manchester
14:00	Shaw 45+2', 47' (pen.), 83'; Aleixandri (yellow card) 49'; Houghton (yellow card) 73'; Greenwood (yellow card) 90+2'	Report	Bizet Ildhusøy 31'; Spence (yellow card) 34'	Stadium: Academy Stadium; Attendance: 3,684; Referee: Abigail Byrne

12 March 2023 15	Brighton & Hove Albion	1–2	Manchester City	Crawley
14:00	Terland 33'	Report	Shaw 21', 89'	Stadium: Broadfield Stadium; Attendance: 3,500; Referee: Yoshimi Yamashita

26 March 2023 16	Manchester City	2–0	Chelsea	Manchester
12:40	Angeldahl 21'; Hemp 30', (yellow card) 73'; Kelly (yellow card) 84'	Report		Stadium: Academy Stadium; Attendance: 5,222; Referee: Paul Howard

2 April 2023 17	Arsenal	2–1	Manchester City	Borehamwood
12:30	McCabe (yellow card) 10', (goal) 74'; Maanum 62'; Wälti (yellow card) 70'	Report	Shaw 5'	Stadium: Meadow Park; Attendance: 3,982; Referee: Abigail Byrne

23 April 2023 18	Manchester City	6–2	West Ham United	Manchester
18:45	Kelly 6', 7'; Coombs 25'; Shaw 62'; Houghton 65'; Fowler 82'	Report	Snerle 11'; Evans 72'; Asseyi (yellow card) 83'	Stadium: Academy Stadium; Attendance: 2,649; Referee: Jane Simms

30 April 2023 19	Manchester City	4–1	Reading	Manchester
14:00	Kelly 15'; Shaw 24'; Hemp 47'; Houghton 70'	Report	Troelsgaard 1'; Primmer (yellow card) 4'; Caldwell (yellow card) 82'	Stadium: Academy Stadium; Attendance: 3,102; Referee: Amy Fearn

7 May 2023 20	Liverpool	2–1	Manchester City	Birkenhead
14:00	Dowie 16'; Holland (yellow card) 45+3'; Bo Kearns 47'	Report	Hemp 28'; Roebuck (yellow card) 74'; Kelly (yellow card) 90+1'	Stadium: Prenton Park; Attendance: 2,552; Referee: Jane Simms

21 May 2023 21	Manchester United	2–1	Manchester City	Leigh
18:45	Ladd 2'; Zelem (yellow card) 90'; García 90+1', (yellow card) 90+2'; Bøe Risa (yellow card) 90+5'	Report	Roebuck (red card) 42'; Angeldahl 68', (yellow card) 77'	Stadium: Leigh Sports Village; Attendance: 7,864; Referee: Rebecca Welch

27 May 2023 22	Manchester City	3–2	Everton	Manchester
14:30	Shaw 51', 69'; Hemp 60'	Report	Graham 79'; Sevecke (yellow card) 89'; Clarke (yellow card) 90'; Maier 90+4'	Stadium: Academy Stadium; Attendance: 3,828; Referee: Kirsty Dowle

==== League table ====
Pos	Team	Pld	W	D	L	GF	GA	GD	Pts	Qualification or relegation
2	Manchester United	22	18	2	2	56	12	+44	56	Qualification for the Champions League second round
3	Arsenal	22	15	2	5	49	16	+33	47	Qualification for the Champions League first round
4	Manchester City	22	15	2	5	50	25	+25	47	
5	Aston Villa	22	11	4	7	47	37	+10	37	
6	Everton	22	9	3	10	29	36	−7	30	

Source: Women's Super League
Rules for classification: 1) Points; 2) Goal difference; 3) Number of goals scored.

=== FA Cup ===
As a member of the first tier, Manchester City entered the FA Cup in the fourth round proper.

29 January 2023 Fourth round	Manchester City	7–0	Sheffield United	Manchester
13:00	Shaw 16', 51', 87'; Kelly 38'; Castellanos 45'; Blakstad 53', 78'	Report		Stadium: Academy Stadium; Attendance: 1,878; Referee: Christiana Hattersley

26 February 2023 Fifth round	Bristol City	1–8	Manchester City	Failand
14:00	Pearce 55'	Report	Shaw 13', 25', 41', 75'; Angeldahl 45+2'; Blakstad 53', 83'; Dahou 90+1'	Stadium: Robins HPC; Attendance: 1,223; Referee: Jane Simms

19 March 2023 Quarter-final	Aston Villa	2–1 (a.e.t.)	Manchester City	Walsall
18:00	Corsie 20'; Daly 96'; Dali (yellow card) 101'; Hanson (yellow card) 117'	Report	Castellanos 38'; Greenwood (yellow card) 53'	Stadium: Bescot Stadium; Referee: Rebecca Welch

=== League Cup ===
As a result of being eliminated from the UEFA Champions League at the qualifying stage, Manchester City entered the League Cup at the group stage. Entering after the draw was made, they were placed in the only remaining Northern region group with four teams.

Group stage

26 October 2022 Group stage	Manchester City	6–0	Blackburn Rovers	Manchester
19:30	Raso 16'; Fowler 40' (pen.), 69'; Losada 43'; Blakstad 85', 87'	Report	Worthington (yellow card) 22'	Stadium: Academy Stadium

27 November 2022 Group stage	Manchester City	3–0	Sunderland	Manchester
14:00	Blakstad 8'; Raso 48', (yellow card) 80'; Shaw 59'	Report		Stadium: Academy Stadium

7 December 2022 Group stage	Liverpool	0–2	Manchester City	Birkenhead
19:00	Silcock (yellow card) 45+2'	Report	Angeldahl 57'; Fowler 74'	Stadium: Prenton Park

18 December 2022 Group stage	Leicester City	P–P	Manchester City	Burton upon Trent
15:00				Stadium: Pirelli Stadium
Note: Postponed due to frozen pitch.

18 January 2023 Group stage	Leicester City	0–1	Manchester City	Burton upon Trent
19:00		Report	Angeldahl 90'	Stadium: Pirelli Stadium
Note: Rescheduled from 18 December 2022.

Pos	Team	Pld	W	WPEN	LPEN	L	GF	GA	GD	Pts	Qualification	MCI	LIV	LEI	SUN	BLB
1	Manchester City	4	4	0	0	0	12	0	+12	12	Advanced to knock-out stage	—	–	–	3–0	6–0
2	Liverpool	4	3	0	0	1	6	2	+4	9	Possible knock-out stage based on ranking	0–2	—	–	–	1–0
3	Leicester City	4	2	0	0	2	8	5	+3	6		–	0–4	—	–	–
4	Sunderland	3	0	0	0	3	0	9	−9	0		—	0–1	0–5	—	–
5	Blackburn Rovers	3	0	0	0	3	0	10	−10	0		–	–	0–3	C–C	—

Rules for classification: 1) Points; 2) Goal difference; 3) Number of goals scored; 4) Number of wins; 5) Head-to-head record

Knockout stage

25 January 2023 Quarter-final	Bristol City	0–6	Manchester City	Bristol
19:00	Syme (yellow card) 14'	Report	Raso 8', 12'; Shaw 30'; Hemp 35', 60'; Fowler 44'; Kennedy (yellow card) 88'	Stadium: Ashton Gate; Attendance: 2,647; Referee: Thomas Kirk

8 February 2023 Semi-final	Arsenal	1–0 (a.e.t.)	Manchester City	Borehamwood
19:15	Wubben-Moy (yellow card) 53'; Little (yellow card) 71'; Rafaelle (yellow card) 81'; Maritz (yellow card) 92'; Blackstenius 93'; Foord (yellow card) 116'	Report	Kelly (yellow card) 34'; Hemp (yellow card) 90+5'	Stadium: Meadow Park; Attendance: 1,795; Referee: Abigail Byrne

=== Champions League ===
As a result of finishing third in the 2021–22 FA Women's Super League, Manchester City entered the Champions League in the first qualifying round.

First qualifying round

18 August 2022 R1 semi-final	Tomiris-Turan (Kazakhstan)	0–6	Manchester City	Madrid, Spain
		Report	Shaw 4', 21'; Hemp 45+1'; Losada 82'; Castellanos 89' (pen.); Sharifova 90+2' (o.g.)	Stadium: Ciudad Real Madrid; Referee: Marina Živković (Serbia)

21 August 2022 R1 final	Real Madrid (Spain)	1–0	Manchester City	Madrid, Spain
	Weir 15'	Report	Greenwood (yellow card) 68'	Stadium: Alfredo Di Stéfano Stadium; Referee: Shona Shukrula (Netherlands)

== Squad information ==
=== Playing statistics ===
As of 27 May 2023

Starting appearances are listed first, followed by substitute appearances after the + symbol where applicable.

No.	Pos	Nat	Player	Total		WSL		FA Cup		League Cup		Champions League	
No.	Pos	Nat	Player	Apps	Goals	Apps	Goals	Apps	Goals	Apps	Goals	Apps	Goals
1	GK	(England) ENG	Ellie Roebuck	22	0	17	0	2	0	1	0	2	0
2	DF	(Netherlands) NED	Kerstin Casparij	25	0	13+4	0	1+1	0	4+1	0	1	0
3	DF	(England) ENG	Demi Stokes	9	0	2+1	0	0+1	0	2+1	0	0+2	0
4	DF	(Spain) ESP	Laia Aleixandri	25	0	15+1	0	3	0	3+1	0	2	0
5	DF	(England) ENG	Alex Greenwood	29	0	20+1	0	3	0	3	0	2	0
6	DF	(England) ENG	Steph Houghton	24	2	13+1	2	1+1	0	5+1	0	0+2	0
7	MF	(England) ENG	Laura Coombs	28	5	20+2	5	1+1	0	0+2	0	1+1	0
8	FW	(Australia) AUS	Mary Fowler	22	5	0+11	1	0+3	0	5+1	4	2	0
9	FW	(England) ENG	Chloe Kelly	30	6	21+1	5	3	1	1+2	0	2	0
10	FW	(Venezuela) VEN	Deyna Castellanos	28	4	12+7	1	3	2	2+2	0	0+2	1
11	FW	(England) ENG	Lauren Hemp	28	10	20	7	2	0	2+2	2	2	1
12	MF	(Sweden) SWE	Filippa Angeldahl	25	5	12+4	2	3	1	6	2	0	0
13	FW	(Australia) AUS	Hayley Raso	25	5	1+15	1	0+1	0	5+1	4	0+2	0
14	DF	(England) ENG	Esme Morgan	23	0	15+2	0	1	0	3+1	0	1	0
15	DF	(Spain) ESP	Leila Ouahabi	24	0	10+6	0	2	0	3+1	0	2	0
21	FW	(Jamaica) JAM	Khadija Shaw	30	31	22	20	3	7	3	2	2	2
22	GK	(England) ENG	Sandy MacIver	9	0	3	0	1	0	5	0	0	0
25	MF	(Japan) JPN	Yui Hasegawa	27	1	20	1	2	0	4+1	0	0	0
33	DF	(Australia) AUS	Alanna Kennedy	7	0	2	0	1	0	2+2	0	0	0
35	GK	(England) ENG	Khiara Keating	3	0	2+1	0	0	0	0	0	0	0
37	FW	(England) ENG	Lois Marley-Paraskevas	2	0	0	0	0	0	0+2	0	0	0
38	DF	(England) ENG	Gracie Prior	1	0	0	0	0	0	0+1	0	0	0
39	MF	(England) ENG	Emma Siddall	1	0	0	0	0	0	0+1	0	0	0
42	MF	(England) ENG	Jemima Dahou	3	1	0+1	0	0+1	1	0+1	0	0	0
Players away from the club on loan:
30	MF	(England) ENG	Ruby Mace	5	0	0+1	0	0	0	1+3	0	0	0
36	MF	(England) ENG	Annie Hutchings	1	0	0	0	0	0	0+1	0	0	0
41	MF	(Norway) NOR	Julie Blakstad	15	9	2+6	2	1+1	4	4+1	3	0	0
Players who appeared for the club but left during the season:
17	MF	(Spain) ESP	Vicky Losada	6	2	0+2	0	0	0	2	1	1+1	1
24	MF	(England) ENG	Keira Walsh	2	0	0	0	0	0	0	0	2	0

== Transfers and loans ==
=== Transfers in ===
Date	Position	No.	Player	From club
3 June 2022	FW	10	(Venezuela) Deyna Castellanos	(Spain) Atlético Madrid
8 June 2022	DF	15	(Spain) Leila Ouahabi	(Spain) Barcelona
9 June 2022	DF	4	(Spain) Laia Aleixandri	(Spain) Atlético Madrid
29 June 2022	FW	8	(Australia) Mary Fowler	(France) Montpellier
2 July 2022	GK	22	(England) Sandy MacIver	(England) Everton
26 July 2022	DF	2	(Netherlands) Kerstin Casparij	(Netherlands) FC Twente
8 September 2022	MF	25	(Japan) Yui Hasegawa	(England) West Ham United

=== Transfers out ===
Date	Position	No.	Player	To club
15 May 2022	GK	1	(England) Karen Bardsley	Retired
17 May 2022	FW	10	(England) Georgia Stanway	(Germany) Bayern Munich
18 May 2022	MF	8	(England) Jill Scott	Retired
25 May 2022	MF	19	(Scotland) Caroline Weir	(Spain) Real Madrid
25 May 2022	GK	34	(France) Karima Benameur Taieb	(France) Marseille
26 May 2022	DF	20	(England) Lucy Bronze	(Spain) Barcelona
22 August 2022	FW	18	(England) Ellen White	Retired
7 September 2022	MF	24	(England) Keira Walsh	(Spain) Barcelona
1 February 2023	MF	17	(Spain) Vicky Losada	(Italy) Roma

=== Loans out ===
Start date	End date	Position	No.	Player	To club
15 July 2022	30 June 2023	FW	16	(England) Jess Park	(England) Everton
13 January 2023	30 June 2023	GK	35	(England) Khiara Keating	(England) Coventry United
28 January 2023	30 June 2023	MF	39	(England) Ruby Mace	(England) Leicester City
1 February 2023	30 June 2023	MF	36	(England) Annie Hutchings (Note: Dual registration)	(England) Blackburn Rovers
31 March 2023	30 June 2023	MF	41	(Norway) Julie Blakstad	(Sweden) BK Häcken
