= List of Women's Super League hat-tricks =

Since the inception of the English women's football league competition, the Women's Super League,^{[a]} in 2011, 65 hat-tricks (three goals in a single match) have been scored by 36 different players playing for 12 different clubs. The first player to achieve the feat was Rachel Williams playing for Birmingham City in a 4–0 victory against Liverpool. 16 players have scored more than one hat-trick and seven players have achieved four or more goals in a game. Chelsea's 6–0 win over Bristol City in 2019 remains the only game where multiple players completed a hat-trick in the same game.

== Hat-tricks ==
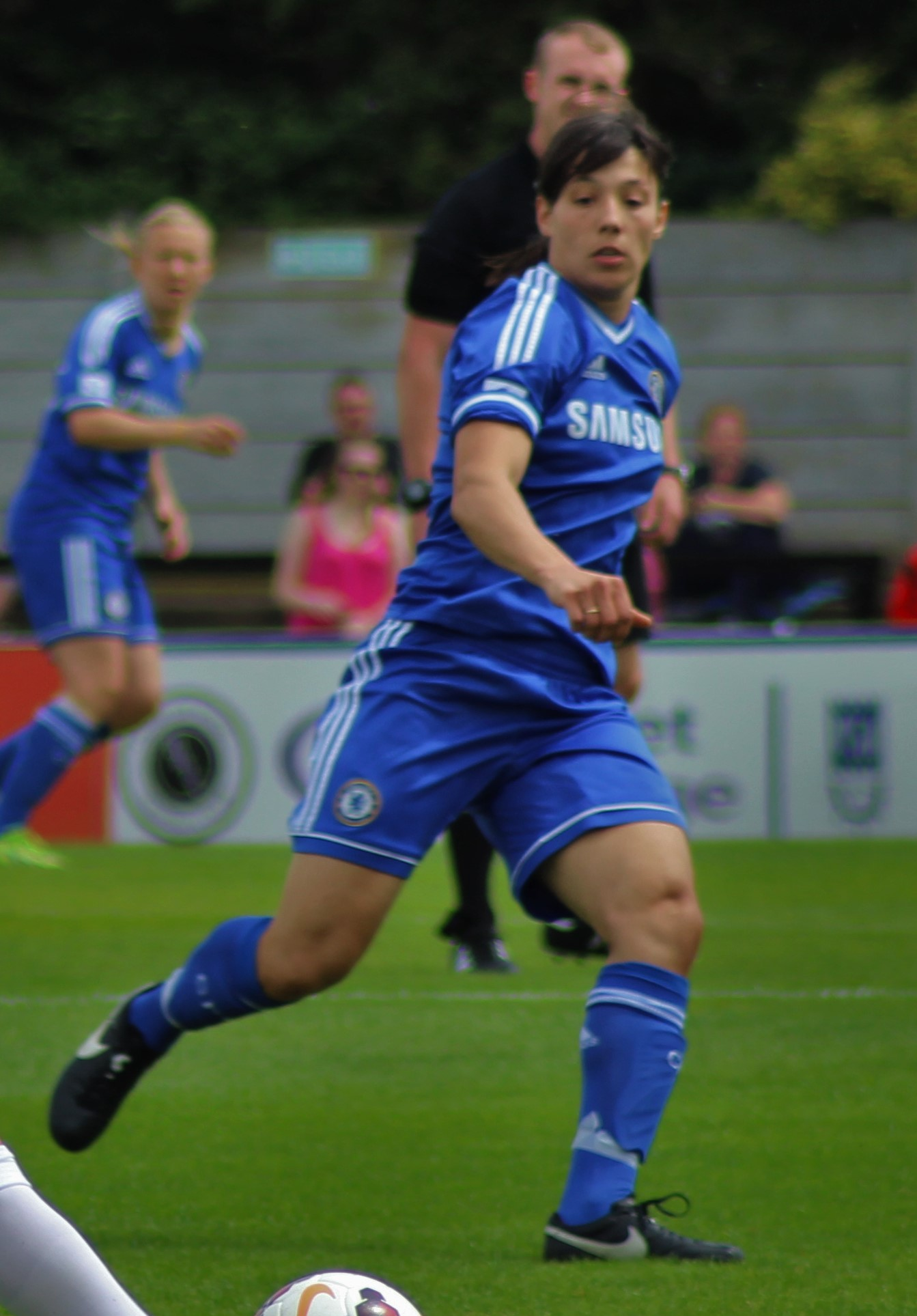
Rachel Williams scored the first hat-trick of the WSL.

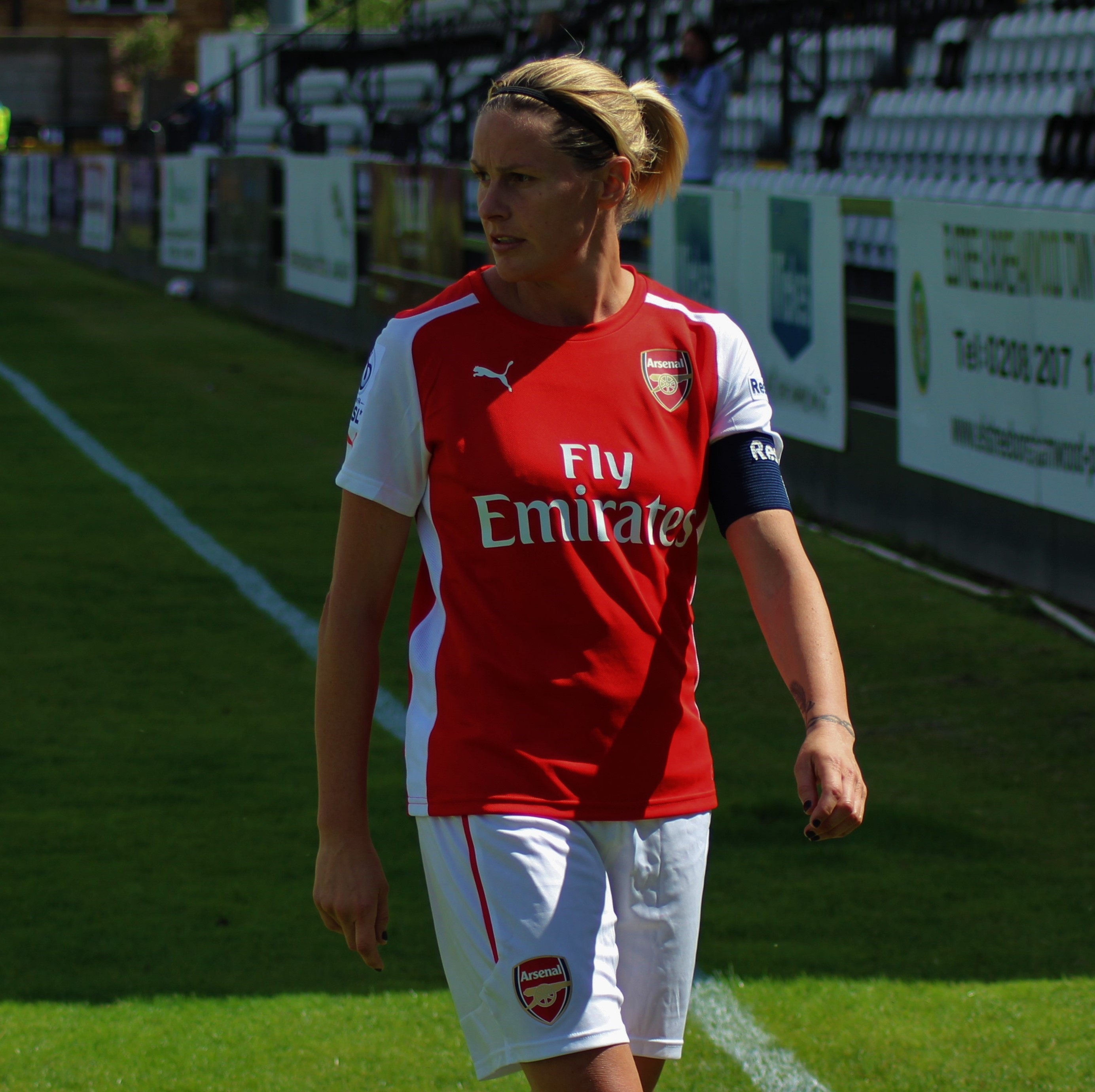
Kelly Smith scored a 16-minute hat-trick as a substitute in September 2014.

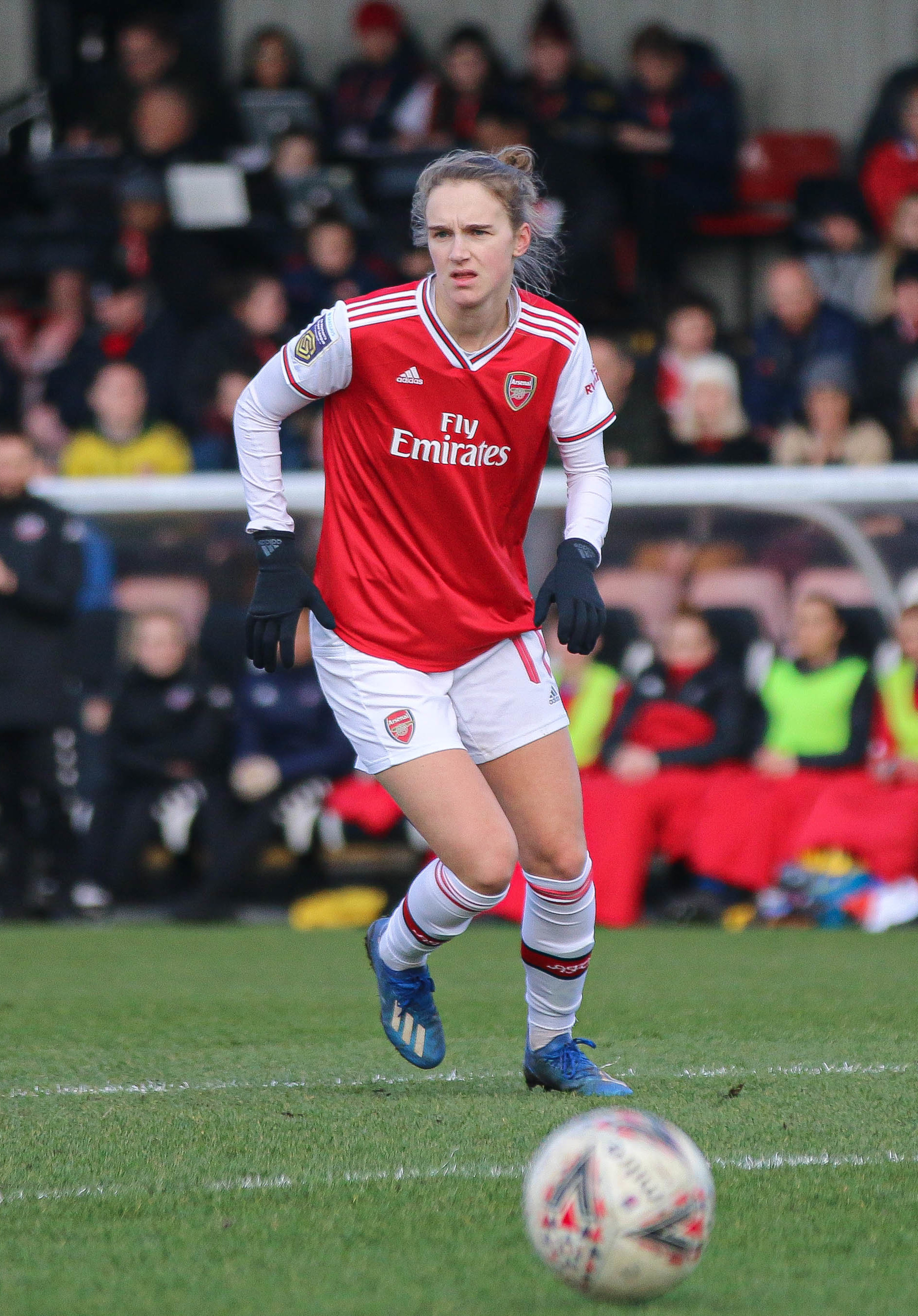
Vivianne Miedema scored the most goals in a match (6).

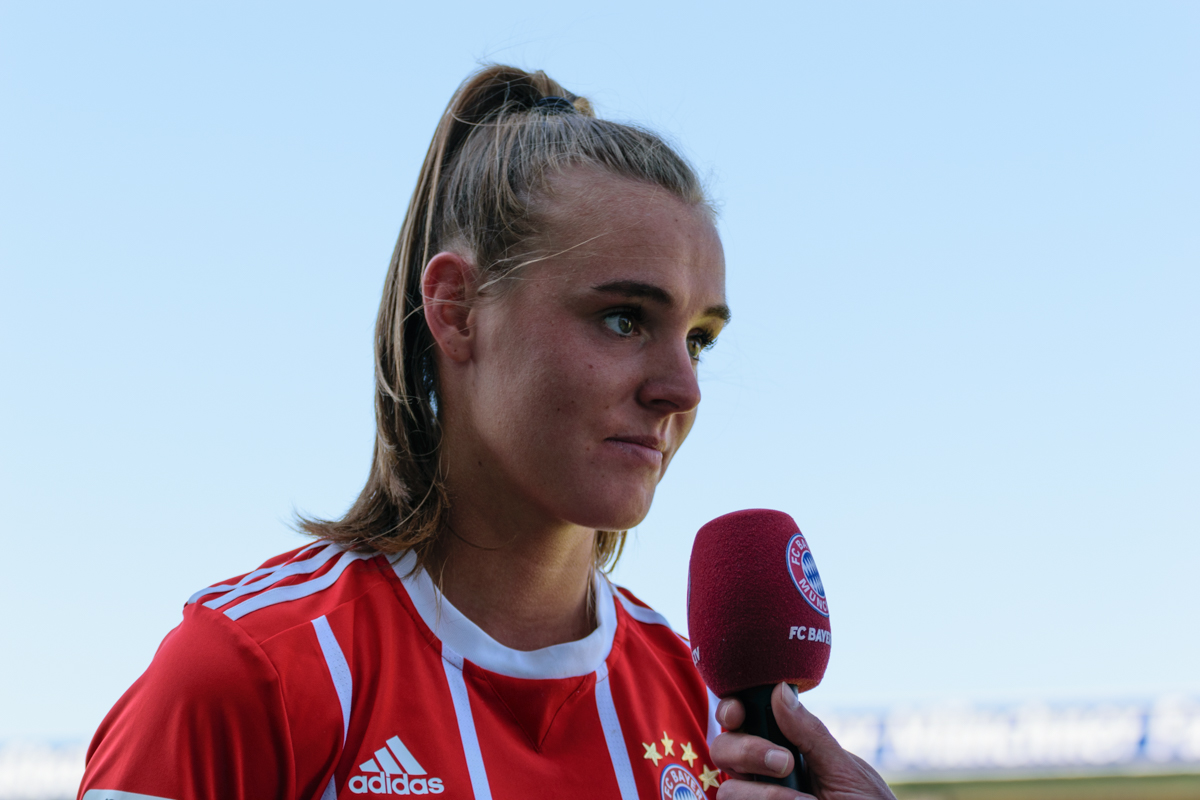
Jill Roord scored two hat-tricks six days apart in September 2020.

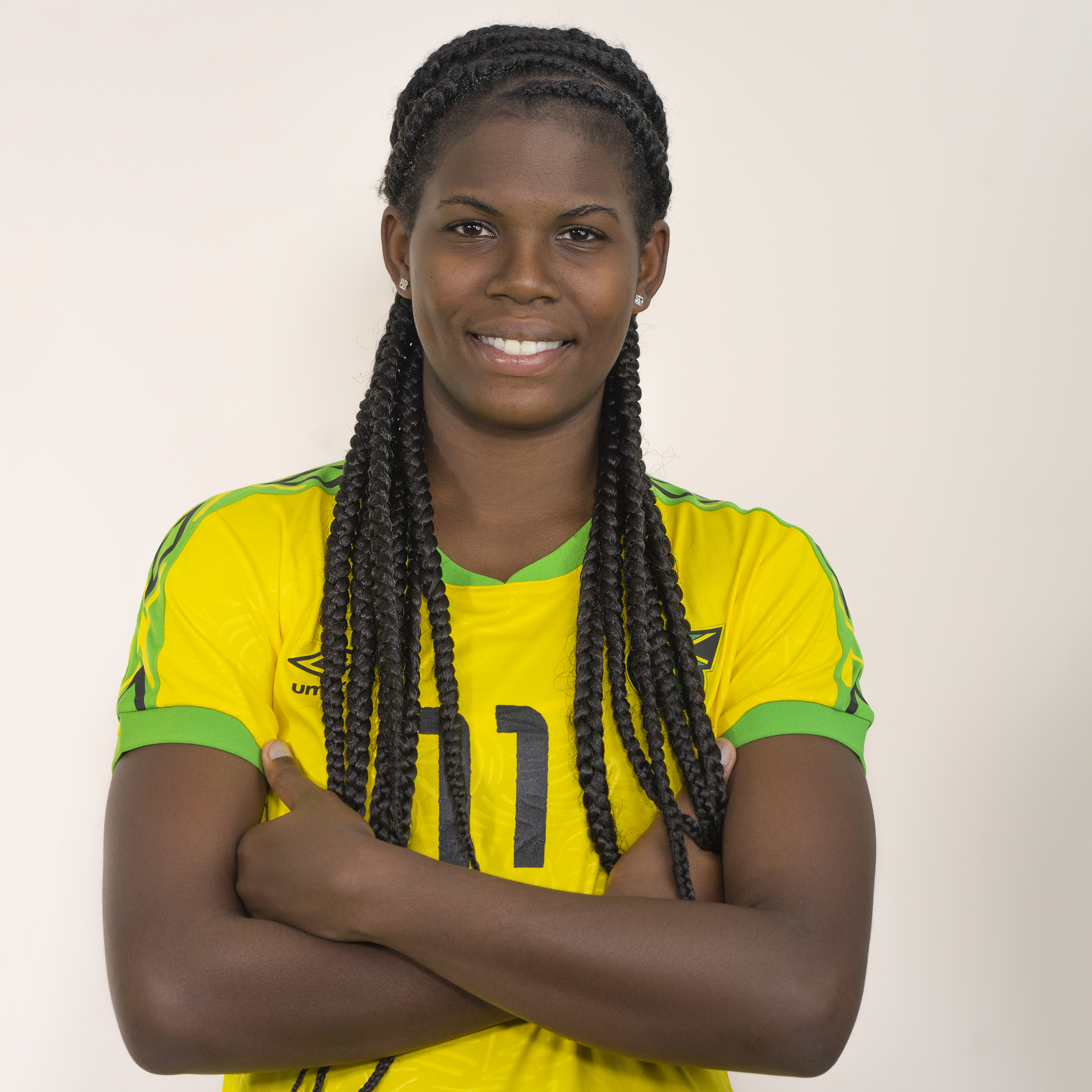
Khadija Shaw scored the most hat-tricks (9), including three in the 2023–24 WSL season.

Key
^{4}	Player scored four goals
^{6}	Player scored six goals
†	Player scored hat-trick as a substitute
§	Player scored hat-trick on WSL debut
^{D L}	Player was not on the winning team (game drawn or lost)
^{P}	Player scored a perfect hat-trick (one goal each with right foot, left foot and head)
B	Team hat-trick scored for
()	Number of times player scored a hat-trick (only for players with multiple hat-tricks)

Women's Super League hat-tricks by player
Player	Nationality	Home team	Result	Away team	Date	Ref.
Rachel Williams (1)	England	Liverpool	0–4	Birmingham City	20 April 2011	
Helen Ward	Wales	Chelsea	3–1	Everton	20 May 2012	
Rachel Williams (2)	England	Liverpool	2–5	Birmingham City	9 September 2012	
Toni Duggan (1)	England	Chelsea	1–4	Everton	9 June 2013	
Natasha Dowie^{4} (1)	England	Doncaster Rovers Belles	0–9	Liverpool	24 August 2013	
Nicole Rolser	Germany	Liverpool	2–4	Birmingham City	1 September 2013	
Natasha Dowie (2)	England	Liverpool	4–2	Everton	12 September 2013	
Kelly Smith†	England	Bristol Academy	3–4	Arsenal	20 September 2014	
Beth Mead	England	Sunderland	4–0	Chelsea	18 July 2015	
Georgia Stanway (1)	England	Manchester City	3–0	Sunderland	31 July 2016	
Kirsty Linnett	England	Sunderland	1–7	Birmingham City	6 November 2016	
Toni Duggan (2)	England	Bristol Academy	0–3	Manchester City	9 May 2017	
Natasha Harding	Wales	Sunderland	1–4	Liverpool	28 October 2017	
Bethany England^{4} (1)	England	Yeovil Town	0–8	Liverpool	6 January 2018	
Ellen White	England	Birmingham City	3–0	Arsenal	29 April 2018	
Nikita Parris (1)	England	Manchester City	5–0	Yeovil Town	16 May 2018	
Vivianne Miedema^{P} (1)	Netherlands	Arsenal	5–0	Liverpool	9 September 2018	
Daniëlle van de Donk	Netherlands	Arsenal	4–3	West Ham United	23 September 2018	
Vivianne Miedema (2)	Netherlands	Arsenal	6–0	Reading	21 October 2018	
Georgia Stanway (2)	England	Brighton & Hove Albion	0–6	Manchester City	21 October 2018	
Bethany England (2)	England	Chelsea	6–0	Bristol City	20 February 2019	
Fran Kirby (1)	England	Chelsea	6–0	Bristol City	20 February 2019	
Fran Kirby (2)	England	Liverpool	0–4	Chelsea	13 March 2019	
Nikita Parris (2)	England	Reading	3–4	Manchester City	13 March 2019	
Vivianne Miedema (3)	Netherlands	Arsenal	4–0	Bristol City	14 March 2019	
Rinsola Babajide	England	Liverpool	5–2	Bristol City	21 April 2019	
Bethany England^{P} (3)	England	Yeovil Town	0–8	Chelsea	7 May 2019	
Vivianne Miedema^{6} (4)	Netherlands	Arsenal	11–1	Bristol City	1 December 2019	
Chloe Kelly (1)	England	Everton	3–1	Reading	19 January 2020	
Martha Thomas (1)	Scotland	Reading	0–5	West Ham United	3 April 2020	
Jill Roord (1)	Netherlands	Arsenal	6–1	Reading	6 September 2020	
Jill Roord (2)	Netherlands	West Ham United	1–9	Arsenal	12 September 2020	
Vivianne Miedema (5)	Netherlands	Arsenal	6–1	Tottenham Hotspur	18 October 2020	
Sam Kerr (1)	Australia	Chelsea	3–2	West Ham United	6 December 2020	
Fran Kirby^{4P} (3)	England	Reading	0–5	Chelsea	10 January 2021	
Hayley Raso^{P}	Australia	Brighton & Hove Albion	0–5	Everton	28 March 2021	
Sam Kerr (2)	Australia	Chelsea	6–0	Birmingham City	4 April 2021	
Sam Kerr (3)	Australia	Chelsea	5–0	Birmingham City	21 November 2021	
Khadija Shaw^{4} (1)	Jamaica	Manchester City	7–2	Brighton & Hove Albion	30 April 2022	
Rachel Daly (1)	England	Aston Villa	3–1	Reading	20 November 2022	
Jordan Nobbs	England	Brighton & Hove Albion	2–6	Aston Villa	12 February 2023	
Alessia Russo	England	Manchester United	5–1	Leicester City	5 March 2023	
Khadija Shaw^{P} (2)	Jamaica	Manchester City	3–1	Tottenham Hotspur	5 March 2023	
Rachel Daly (2)	England	Reading	0–5	Aston Villa	7 May 2023	
Martha Thomas (2)	Scotland	Aston Villa	2–4	Tottenham Hotspur	21 October 2023	
Sjoeke Nüsken	Germany	Chelsea	4–2	Brighton & Hove Albion	22 October 2023	
Lauren James (1)	England	Chelsea	5–1	Liverpool	18 November 2023	
Khadija Shaw (3)	Jamaica	Manchester City	7–0	Tottenham Hotspur	26 November 2023	
Khadija Shaw^{P} (4)	Jamaica	Everton	1–4	Manchester City	17 December 2023	
Lauren James (2)	England	Chelsea	3–1	Manchester United	21 January 2024	
Khadija Shaw (5)	Jamaica	Manchester City	5–1	Liverpool	21 January 2024	
Guro Reiten^{4}	Norway	Chelsea	8–0	Bristol City	5 May 2024	
Leanne Kiernan	Ireland	Leicester City	0–4	Liverpool	18 May 2024	
Kiko Seike§	Japan	Brighton & Hove Albion	4–0	Everton	21 September 2024	
Khadija Shaw (6)	Jamaica	Manchester City	4–0	Tottenham Hotspur	8 November 2024	
Ella Toone	England	Manchester City	2–4	Manchester United	19 January 2025	
Shekiera Martinez^{4}	Germany	Crystal Palace	1–7	West Ham United	27 April 2025	
Ornella Vignola§	Spain	Liverpool	1–4	Everton	7 September 2025	
Khadija Shaw^{4} (7)	Jamaica	Manchester City	6–1	Aston Villa	14 December 2025	
Kerolin	Brazil	Manchester City	5–1	Chelsea	1 February 2026	
Khadija Shaw (8)	Jamaica	Manchester City	5–2	Tottenham Hotspur	21 March 2026	
Chloe Kelly (2)	England	Arsenal	5–0	West Ham United	21 March 2026	
Alessia Russo (2)	England	Arsenal	5–2	Tottenham Hotspur	28 March 2026	
Olivia Holdt	Denmark	Crystal Palace	0–7	Tottenham Hotspur	20 September 2026	
Khadija Shaw^{P} (9)	Jamaica	Manchester City	5–0	West Ham United	7 November 2026	

== Multiple hat-tricks ==
The following table lists the number of hat-tricks scored by players who have scored two or more hat-tricks.

Rank	Player	Club(s)	Hat-tricks
1	(Jamaica) Khadija Shaw	Manchester City	9
2	(Netherlands) Vivianne Miedema	Arsenal	5
3	Bethany England	Liverpool, Chelsea	3
3	(Australia) Sam Kerr	Chelsea	3
3	(England) Fran Kirby	Chelsea	3
6	(England) Rachel Daly	Aston Villa	2
6	(England) Natasha Dowie	Liverpool	2
6	(England) Toni Duggan	Everton, Manchester City	2
6	(England) Lauren James	Chelsea	2
6	(England) Chloe Kelly	Everton, Arsenal	2
6	(England) Nikita Parris	Manchester City	2
6	(Netherlands) Jill Roord	Arsenal	2
6	(England) Alessia Russo	Manchester United, Arsenal	2
6	(England) Georgia Stanway	Manchester City	2
6	(Scotland) Martha Thomas	West Ham United, Tottenham Hotspur	2
6	(England) Rachel Williams	Birmingham City	2

== Hat-tricks by nationality ==
The following table lists the number of hat-tricks scored by players from a single nation.

Note: Nationality as defined under FIFA eligibility rules. Players may hold more than one non-FIFA nationality.

Women's Super League hat-tricks by nationality
Rank	Nation	Hat-tricks	Players	First hat-trick	Last hat-trick
1	England	31	18	20 April 2011	28 March 2026
2	Jamaica	9	1	30 April 2022	7 November 2026
2	Netherlands	8	3	9 September 2018	18 October 2020
4	Australia	4	2	6 December 2020	21 November 2021
5	Germany	3	3	1 September 2013	27 April 2025
6	Scotland	2	1	3 April 2020	21 October 2023
6	Wales	2	2	20 May 2012	28 October 2017
8	Brazil	1	1	1 February 2026	
8	Denmark	1	1	20 September 2026	
8	Japan	1	1	21 September 2024	
8	Norway	1	1	5 May 2024	
8	Republic of Ireland	1	1	18 May 2024	
8	Spain	1	1	7 September 2025	

== Hat-tricks by club ==
=== For ===
The following table lists the number of hat-tricks scored by players from given club.

Women's Super League hat-tricks scored by club
Rank	Club	Hat-tricks	Players	First hat-trick	Last hat-trick
1	Manchester City	15	5	31 July 2016	7 November 2026
2	Chelsea	13	7	20 May 2012	5 May 2024
3	Arsenal	11	6	20 September 2014	28 March 2026
4	Liverpool	6	5	24 August 2013	18 May 2024
5	Birmingham City	5	4	20 April 2011	29 April 2018
6	Everton	4	4	9 June 2013	7 September 2025
7	Aston Villa	3	2	20 November 2022	7 May 2023
8	Manchester United	2	2	5 March 2023	19 January 2025
8	Tottenham Hotspur	2	2	21 October 2023	20 September 2026
8	West Ham United	2	2	3 April 2020	27 April 2025
11	Brighton & Hove Albion	1	1	21 September 2024	
11	Sunderland	1	1	18 July 2015	

=== Against ===
The following table lists the number of hat-tricks scored against given club.

Women's Super League hat-tricks conceded by club
Rank	Club	Hat-tricks	Players	First hat-trick	Last hat-trick
1	Bristol City	8	7	20 September 2014	5 May 2024
1	Liverpool	8	6	24 August 2013	7 September 2025
1	Reading	8	7	21 October 2018	7 May 2023
4	Tottenham Hotspur	6	3	18 October 2020	28 March 2026
5	Brighton & Hove Albion	5	5	21 October 2018	22 October 2023
5	West Ham United	5	5	23 September 2018	7 November 2026
7	Everton	4	4	20 May 2012	21 September 2024
8	Chelsea	3	3	9 June 2013	1 February 2026
8	Sunderland	3	3	31 July 2016	28 October 2017
8	Yeovil Town	3	2	6 January 2018	7 May 2019
11	Aston Villa	2	2	21 October 2023	14 December 2025
11	Birmingham City	2	1	4 April 2021	21 November 2021
11	Crystal Palace	2	2	27 April 2025	20 September 2026
11	Leicester City	2	2	5 March 2023	18 May 2024
15	Arsenal	1	1	29 April 2018	
15	Doncaster Rovers Belles	1	1	24 August 2013	
15	Manchester City	1	1	19 January 2025	
15	Manchester United	1	1	21 January 2024	

== Notes ==
^{a} The league, which started in 2011, was divided in two separate divisions (WSL 1 and WSL 2) from 2014 with the latter rebranded as the Women's Championship following a restructure in 2019; only the WSL 1 is considered in this list.
