= English Footballer of the Year =

English footballer of the year may refer to the winner of either:

- FWA Footballer of the Year
- PFA Players' Player of the Year
- PFA Women's Players' Player of the Year
