= Khadija Shaw =

Jamaican footballer (born 1997)

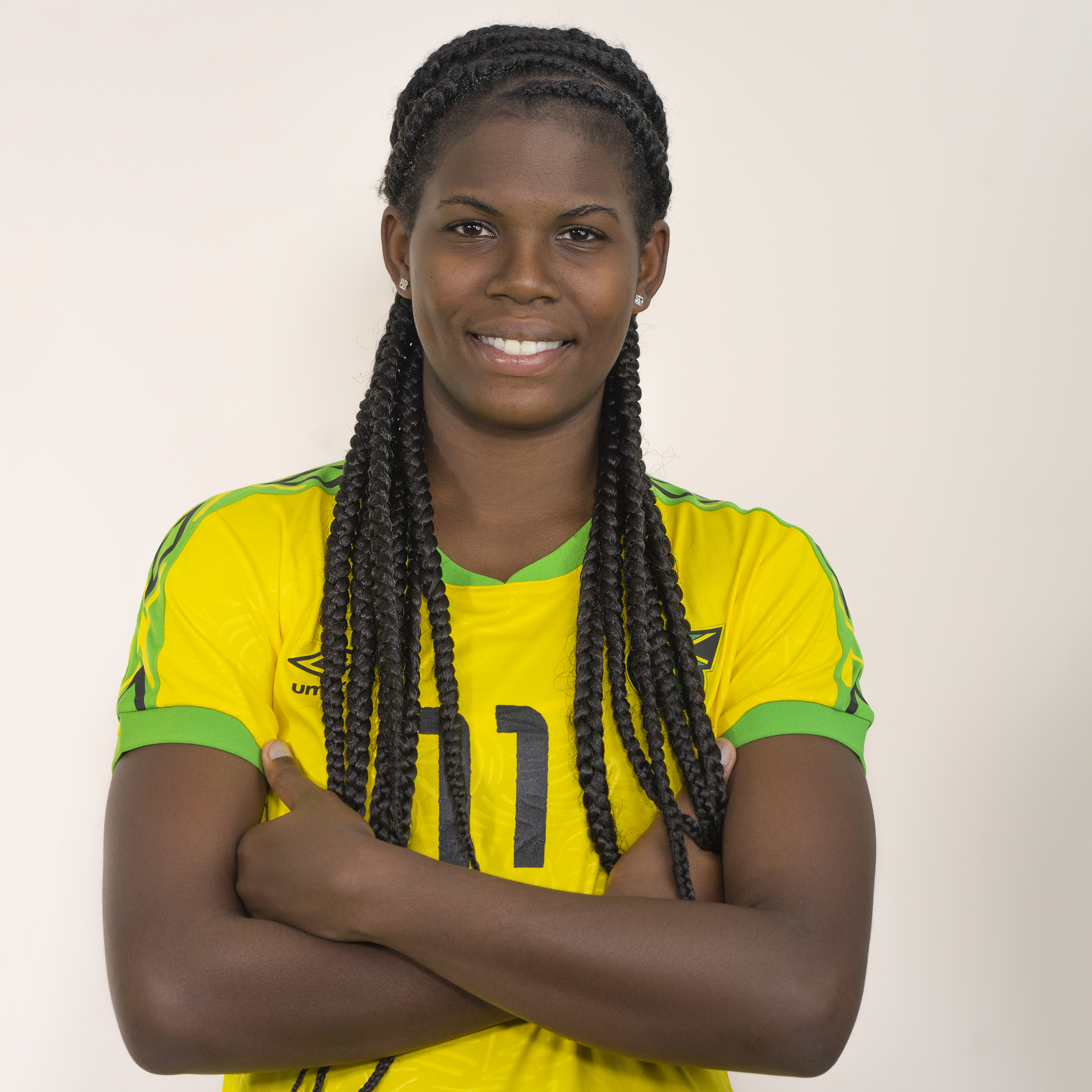
- Khadija Shaw posing in the Jamaica national team kit

Personal information
- Full name: Khadija Monifa Shaw
- Date of birth: 31 January 1997 (age 29)
- Place of birth: Spanish Town, Jamaica
- Height: 1.82 m (6 ft 0 in)
- Position: Forward

Team information
- Current team: Manchester City
- Number: 9

College career
Years	Team	Apps	(Gls)
2015–2016	EFSC Titans	21	(24)
2017–2018	Tennessee Volunteers	35	(27)

Senior career*
Years	Team	Apps	(Gls)
2018	Florida Krush	1	(1)
2019–2021	Bordeaux	35	(32)
2021–	Manchester City	104	(96)

International career^{‡}
2011–2013	Jamaica U17	8	(2)
2011–2015	Jamaica U20	7	(0)
2015–	Jamaica	49	(67)
Medal record
Women's football
Representing Jamaica
CONCACAF W Championship
Third place	United States 2018	Team
Third place	Mexico 2022	Team
- * Club domestic league appearances and goals as of 22:05, 22 November 2026 (UTC) ‡ National team caps and goals as of 9 October 2026 (UTC)

Khadija Monifa "Bunny" Shaw CD (/xəˈdiːdʒə/ khə-DEE-jə; born 31 January 1997) is a Jamaican professional footballer who plays as a forward for Women's Super League club Manchester City and captains the Jamaica women's national team. Widely considered to be one of the best strikers in the world, she is Manchester City's all-time top goalscorer, Jamaica's all-time top goalscorer, holds the record for most hat tricks in the WSL, and was awarded CONCACAF Player of the Year in 2022.

Shaw previously played for Division 1 club Bordeaux, became top scorer in the 2020–21 season, and was twice awarded Player of the Month. With Manchester City, she is a League Cup winner and was voted Player of the Season for the club as top scorer in the 2022–23 season. For the same season, Shaw was named in the WSL Team of the Year, and twice awarded WSL Player of the Month. The following season, she was named FWA Women's Footballer of the Year.

== Early life ==
Shaw was born in Spanish Town, Jamaica to George Shaw, a shoemaker, and mother Monica, a chicken farmer. She was the youngest of 13 brothers and sisters. Shaw was nicknamed 'Bunny' by her brother Kentardo because of a fondness for carrots at an early age. She attended high school at St. Jago High School.

Shaw began playing football with her older brothers before being taught by her brother Kentardo at age 10. At age 13, Shaw was called up for the Jamaica U15s team for the first time. While representing Jamaica, she received scholarship offers from Navarro College in Texas and Eastern Florida State College. She was then scouted by the University of Tennessee. She graduated from the University of Tennessee with a degree in communication.

== College career ==
Shaw played her first two years of junior college at Eastern Florida State College, earning NSCAA first-team National Junior College Athletic Association All-America honors in 2016.

In 2017, Shaw transferred to the University of Tennessee. During her time with the Tennessee Volunteers, she was converted from a midfielder to a striker by her coach Brian Pensky. She was named to the All-SEC first team in both her seasons with Tennessee and was awarded SEC Offensive Player of the Year as a senior in 2018. She decided against entering into the NWSL Draft after college in order to look at overseas options in Europe and Asia.

== Club career ==
=== Florida Krush ===
In 2018, Shaw played for WPSL semi-pro team Florida Krush.

=== Bordeaux ===
==== 2019–20 ====
On 7 June 2019, D1 Féminine team Bordeaux announced they had signed Shaw on a two-year contract. Khadija made her professional debut on 25 August 2019 with Bordeaux against FC Fleury 91. On her debut game, she scored a brace that led to a 4–1 victory for the home team. She repeated her performance, at an away game this time against Dijon FCO, on her second game. In her first season, she scored 10 goals and made five assists in 15 league matches.

==== 2020–21 ====
Shaw scored four goals in a 6–1 victory over FC Fleury 91 on 10 October 2020. She went on and scored hat-tricks against Dijon FCO and Stade de Reims during the season, with the former happening on 31 October 2020 to help earn them a 5–1 home victory and the later on 23 January 2021 to help Bordeaux to a massive 7–1 victory. Her goal scoring run and general performance earned her the Division 1 Féminine Player of the Month twice in the months of October 2020 and January 2021. She ended her second league season with 22 goals and seven assists in 20 matches winning the as the top goal scorer, beating Marie-Antoinette Katoto by a goal and also earning a place on the Trophées FFF D1 Féminine 2020–2021 Team of the Year. She was nominated for the best player of the season awards for both Trophées UNFP du football and Trophées FFF D1 Féminine, however she was beaten by Kadidiatou Diani for both.

=== Manchester City ===
==== 2021–22 ====
On 17 June 2021, Manchester City announced that they had signed Shaw from Bordeaux on a three-year deal. Shaw spent her first season at the club primarily as the second choice striker behind Ellen White. She scored her first hat-trick for the club in a 6–0 FA Cup win against Leicester City. She also featured as the joint topscorer of the 2021–22 FA League Cup. Shaw went on to claim a winners medal as Manchester City triumphed, defeating Chelsea 3–1 in the League Cup final. She later scored four goals in Manchester City's 7–2 win over Brighton & Hove Albion in the Super League. She would finish her first season as the team second highest goalscorer with 16 goals.

==== 2022–23 ====
Shaw had her breakout year in her second season with the club as she established herself as the first choice striker following Ellen White's retirement. On 12 March 2023, Shaw scored a brace in a 2–1 win over Brighton & Hove Albion taking her tally to 26 goals in 22 games with seven WSL games to go, becoming Manchester City's highest-scoring women's player in a single season and breaking Nikita Parris' record of 24 goals in the 2018–19 season. On 5 May 2023, Shaw was named as the 2022 CONCACAF Female Player of the Year, becoming the first Caribbean player in history to win the award. On 27 May, Shaw scored her 50th club goal as she scored twice in a 3–2 victory over Everton in their final Women's Super League game of the season. At the end of the 2022–23 season, she scored 31 goals in 30 games in all competitions for Manchester City and was named the club's player of the season. She missed out on the Super League Golden Boot by two goals to Rachel Daly, after leading the top scorer charts for majority of the season. Shaw's goal against Arsenal on 2 April 2023 was voted the club's Goal of the Season. She was further named in the 2023 PFA WSL Team of the Year and nominated as one of 30 candidates for the Ballon d'Or. On 30 May 2023, Shaw signed a two-year contract extension, that would keep her at the club until 2026.

==== 2023–24 ====
On 26 November 2023, Shaw scored a first-half hat trick against Tottenham Hotspur in a 7–0 victory against the club, followed by another hat trick against Everton on 17 December to become the WSL top scorer with 9 goals in 9 appearances. She was awarded WSL Player of the Month for December 2023. On 21 January 2024, Shaw scored her third hat trick of the 2023–24 season against Liverpool, to become joint-top hat trick scorer in the league, alongside Arsenal's Vivianne Miedema with five hat tricks. Shaw scored in the 1–0 victory against Chelsea, bringing Manchester City level in points with Chelsea on top of the league. She scored first in the 2–1 win over Everton on 2 March 2024, placing Manchester City at the top of the league. On 23 March 2024, Shaw became Manchester City's all time goalscorer after netting her 68th goal in 81 appearances for the club in a 3–1 win over derby rivals Manchester United. On 3 May, she was named FWA Women's Footballer of the Year. After scoring 21 goals in 18 appearances, Shaw won the season's Golden Boot. She was also awarded Super League Player of the Season and the PFA Women's Players' Player of the Year.

==== 2024–25 ====
In the opening home game of the season, Shaw scored in the 1–0 win over Brighton. Away at Liverpool, after being down a goal in the first half, she scored twice in the 58th and 92nd minute, making the final score 2–1. Shaw scored her sixth WSL hat trick on 8 November 2024 in a 4–0 home win against Tottenham Hotspur, becoming the outright record holder for the most hat tricks scored in the league. On 21 November 2024, Shaw's two goals against Hammarby in the Champions League made her the club's all-time top goalscorer in the competition. This 2–1 victory advanced her team to the quarterfinals of the Champions League. Despite being sidelined with multiple injuries throughout the campaign, Shaw still won her second consecutive WSL Golden Boot after scoring 12 goals in 14 appearances, sharing the award with Alessia Russo.

==== 2025–26 ====
In the first home game of the 2025–26 season, Shaw scored the opening goal in an eventual 2–1 win against Brighton. Shaw scored two penalty goals against London City Lionesses in a 4–1 victory. She headed in a winner against Everton to send her team to the top of the WSL table. On 14 December 2025, she scored four goals in a 6–1 victory over Aston Villa, becoming the first Manchester City player to reach over 100 goals. Shaw scored her thirteenth goal of the season in a 2–1 victory over London City Lionesses to put them nine points ahead of second place Chelsea. On 21 March 2026, Shaw broke the WSL record for the fastest hat-trick in league history within 12 minutes and 37 seconds as she scored in the 8th, 18th, and 21st minute of a 5–2 win over Tottenham. The goals brought her scoring record that season to 18 goals in 18 matches up to that point, and it marked her fourth consecutive hat-trick when playing at home against Tottenham. Shaw continued her goal scoring form after the April international break, scoring once against Brighton, despite Manchester City losing that match 3–2. On 8 May, Shaw was named as the FWA Women's Footballer of the Year for the second time. Later that month, on 25 May, she extended her contract with the club until 2030.

==== 2026–27 ====
On 18 October 2026, Shaw scored her sixth and seven league goals of the season, becoming the third player to score 90 career goals in the Women's Super League.

== International career ==
Shaw has played internationally at the U-15, U-17, U-20, and senior levels for Jamaica, debuting for the former aged 14.

Shaw made her senior international debut on 23 August 2015, scoring twice in a 6–0 victory over the Dominican Republic in an Olympic qualifying game. In 2019, Shaw was part of the Jamaica team that qualified for the 2019 World Cup. In doing so, they became the first Caribbean nation to ever qualify for a Women's World Cup. She would again lead her country to the 2023 World Cup, where they reached the Round of 16; this was the first time either the women's or men's national team had progressed into a World Cup knockout stage.

== Career statistics ==
=== Club ===
As of match played 22 November 2026

Appearances and goals by club, season and competition
Club	Season	League			National cup (Note: Includes Coupe de France Féminine, Women's FA Cup)		League cup (Note: Includes WSL Players Cup)		Continental		Total	
Club	Season	Division	Apps	Goals	Apps	Goals	Apps	Goals	Apps	Goals	Apps	Goals
Bordeaux	2019–20	D1 Féminine	15	10	3	0	—		—		18	10
Bordeaux	2020–21	D1 Féminine	20	22	1	2	—		—		21	24
Bordeaux	Total		35	32	4	2	0	0	0	0	39	34
Manchester City	2020–21	Women's Super League	—		1 (Note: Joined during 2021–22 season but competed in the postponed 2020–21 FA Cup)	3	—		—		1	3
Manchester City	2021–22	Women's Super League	17	9	4	3	4	4	2 (Note: Appearances in UEFA Women's Champions League)	0	27	16
Manchester City	2022–23	Women's Super League	22	20	3	7	3	2	2	2	30	31
Manchester City	2023–24	Women's Super League	18	21	3	0	4	1	—		25	22
Manchester City	2024–25	Women's Super League	14	12	2	2	1	0	5	5	22	19
Manchester City	2025–26	Women's Super League	22	21	5	5	5	1	—		32	27
Manchester City	2026–27	Women's Super League	11	13	0	0	—		4	3	15	16
Manchester City	Total		104	96	18	20	17	8	13	10	152	134
Career total			139	128	22	22	17	8	13	10	191	168

=== International ===
As of match played 9 October 2026

Appearances and goals by national team and year
National team	Year	Apps	Goals
Jamaica	2015	2	3
Jamaica	2018	12	21
Jamaica	2019	11	16
Jamaica	2020	3	2
Jamaica	2021	1	0
Jamaica	2022	9	13
Jamaica	2023	4	0
Jamaica	2024	2	2
Jamaica	2025	1	3
Jamaica	2026	4	7
Total		49	67

Scores and results list Jamaica's goal tally first, score column indicates score after each Shaw goal.

List of international goals scored by Khadija Shaw
No.	Date	Venue	Opponent	Score	Result	Competition	Ref.
1	23 August 2015	Estadio Panamericano, San Cristóbal, Dominican Republic	Dominican Republic	1–0	6–0	2016 CONCACAF Women's Olympic Qualifying Championship qualification	
2	23 August 2015	Estadio Panamericano, San Cristóbal, Dominican Republic	Dominican Republic	3–0	6–0	2016 CONCACAF Women's Olympic Qualifying Championship qualification	
3	25 August 2015	Estadio Panamericano, San Cristóbal, Dominican Republic	Dominica	3–0	12–0	2016 CONCACAF Women's Olympic Qualifying Championship qualification	
4	9 May 2018	Stade Sylvio Cator, Port-au-Prince, Haiti	Guadeloupe	1–0	13–0	2018 CONCACAF Women's Championship qualification	
5	9 May 2018	Stade Sylvio Cator, Port-au-Prince, Haiti	Guadeloupe	4–0	13–0	2018 CONCACAF Women's Championship qualification	
6	9 May 2018	Stade Sylvio Cator, Port-au-Prince, Haiti	Guadeloupe	5–0	13–0	2018 CONCACAF Women's Championship qualification	
7	9 May 2018	Stade Sylvio Cator, Port-au-Prince, Haiti	Guadeloupe	7–0	13–0	2018 CONCACAF Women's Championship qualification	
8	9 May 2018	Stade Sylvio Cator, Port-au-Prince, Haiti	Guadeloupe	9–0	13–0	2018 CONCACAF Women's Championship qualification	
9	9 May 2018	Stade Sylvio Cator, Port-au-Prince, Haiti	Guadeloupe	11–0	13–0	2018 CONCACAF Women's Championship qualification	
10	11 May 2018	Stade Sylvio Cator, Port-au-Prince, Haiti	Martinique	3–0	3–0	2018 CONCACAF Women's Championship qualification	
11	13 May 2018	Stade Sylvio Cator, Port-au-Prince, Haiti	Haiti	2–2	2–2	2018 CONCACAF Women's Championship qualification	
12	19 July 2018	Estadio Moderno Julio Torres, Barranquilla, Colombia	Venezuela	1–0	1–2	2018 Central American and Caribbean Games	
13	21 July 2018	Estadio Moderno Julio Torres, Barranquilla, Colombia	Costa Rica	1–0	1–2	2018 Central American and Caribbean Games	
14	25 August 2018	National Stadium, Kingston, Jamaica	Antigua and Barbuda	3–0	9–0	2018 CONCACAF Women's Championship qualification	
15	25 August 2018	National Stadium, Kingston, Jamaica	Antigua and Barbuda	5–0	9–0	2018 CONCACAF Women's Championship qualification	
16	25 August 2018	National Stadium, Kingston, Jamaica	Antigua and Barbuda	6–0	9–0	2018 CONCACAF Women's Championship qualification	
17	27 August 2018	National Stadium, Kingston, Jamaica	Bermuda	3–0	4–0	2018 CONCACAF Women's Championship qualification	
18	31 August 2018	National Stadium, Kingston, Jamaica	Trinidad and Tobago	2–1	4–1	2018 CONCACAF Women's Championship qualification	
19	31 August 2018	National Stadium, Kingston, Jamaica	Trinidad and Tobago	3–1	4–1	2018 CONCACAF Women's Championship qualification	
20	2 September 2018	National Stadium, Kingston, Jamaica	Cuba	2–0	6–1	2018 CONCACAF Women's Championship qualification	
21	2 September 2018	National Stadium, Kingston, Jamaica	Cuba	5–0	6–1	2018 CONCACAF Women's Championship qualification	
22	8 October 2018	H-E-B Park, Edinburg, United States	Costa Rica	1–0	1–0	2018 CONCACAF Women's Championship	
23	11 October 2018	H-E-B Park, Edinburg, United States	Cuba	1–0	9–0	2018 CONCACAF Women's Championship	
24	17 October 2018	Toyota Stadium, Frisco, United States	Panama	1–0	2–2	2018 CONCACAF Women's Championship	
25	3 March 2019	Catherine Hall Sports Complex, Montego Bay, Jamaica	Chile	1–1	3–2	Friendly	
26	3 March 2019	Catherine Hall Sports Complex, Montego Bay, Jamaica	Chile	2–1	3–2	Friendly	
27	7 April 2019	Moses Mabhida Stadium, Johannesburg, South Africa	South Africa	1–1	1–1	Friendly	
28	19 May 2019	National Stadium, Kingston, Jamaica	Panama	1–0	3–1	Friendly	
29	19 May 2019	National Stadium, Kingston, Jamaica	Panama	2–0	3–1	Friendly	
30	28 May 2019	Hampden Park, Glasgow, Scotland	Scotland	1–0	2–3	Friendly	
31	28 May 2019	Hampden Park, Glasgow, Scotland	Scotland	2–2	2–3	Friendly	
32	4 October 2019	National Stadium, Kingston, Jamaica	Barbados	7–0	7–0	2020 CONCACAF Women's Olympic Qualifying Championship qualification	
33	6 October 2019	National Stadium, Kingston, Jamaica	Saint Lucia	1–0	11–0	2020 CONCACAF Women's Olympic Qualifying Championship qualification	
34	6 October 2019	National Stadium, Kingston, Jamaica	Saint Lucia	3–0	11–0	2020 CONCACAF Women's Olympic Qualifying Championship qualification	
35	6 October 2019	National Stadium, Kingston, Jamaica	Saint Lucia	6–0	11–0	2020 CONCACAF Women's Olympic Qualifying Championship qualification	
36	8 October 2019	National Stadium, Kingston, Jamaica	U.S. Virgin Islands	1–0	7–0	2020 CONCACAF Women's Olympic Qualifying Championship qualification	
37	8 October 2019	National Stadium, Kingston, Jamaica	U.S. Virgin Islands	3–0	7–0	2020 CONCACAF Women's Olympic Qualifying Championship qualification	
38	8 October 2019	National Stadium, Kingston, Jamaica	U.S. Virgin Islands	4–0	7–0	2020 CONCACAF Women's Olympic Qualifying Championship qualification	
39	8 October 2019	National Stadium, Kingston, Jamaica	U.S. Virgin Islands	5–0	7–0	2020 CONCACAF Women's Olympic Qualifying Championship qualification	
40	8 October 2019	National Stadium, Kingston, Jamaica	U.S. Virgin Islands	7–0	7–0	2020 CONCACAF Women's Olympic Qualifying Championship qualification	
41	4 February 2020	H-E-B Park, Edinburg, United States	Saint Kitts and Nevis	1–0	7–0	2020 CONCACAF Women's Olympic Qualifying Championship	
42	4 February 2020	H-E-B Park, Edinburg, United States	Saint Kitts and Nevis	4–0	7–0	2020 CONCACAF Women's Olympic Qualifying Championship	
43	17 February 2022	National Stadium, Kingston, Jamaica	Bermuda	3–0	4–0	2022 CONCACAF W Championship qualification	
44	17 February 2022	National Stadium, Kingston, Jamaica	Bermuda	4–0	4–0	2022 CONCACAF W Championship qualification	
45	20 February 2022	Kirani James Stadium, St. George's, Grenada	Grenada	3–0	6–1	2022 CONCACAF W Championship qualification	
46	20 February 2022	Kirani James Stadium, St. George's, Grenada	Grenada	6–1	6–1	2022 CONCACAF W Championship qualification	
47	9 April 2022	Truman Bodden Stadium, George Town, Cayman Islands	Cayman Islands	6–0	9–0	2022 CONCACAF W Championship qualification	
48	9 April 2022	Truman Bodden Stadium, George Town, Cayman Islands	Cayman Islands	7–0	9–0	2022 CONCACAF W Championship qualification	
49	9 April 2022	Truman Bodden Stadium, George Town, Cayman Islands	Cayman Islands	8–0	9–0	2022 CONCACAF W Championship qualification	
50	12 April 2022	Sabina Park, Kingston, Jamaica	Dominican Republic	4–1	5–1	2022 CONCACAF W Championship qualification	
51	12 April 2022	Sabina Park, Kingston, Jamaica	Dominican Republic	5–1	5–1	2022 CONCACAF W Championship qualification	
52	4 July 2022	Estadio Universitario, San Nicolás de los Garza, Mexico	Mexico	1–0	1–0	2022 CONCACAF W Championship	
53	11 July 2022	Estadio BBVA, Guadalupe, Mexico	Haiti	2–0	4–0	2022 CONCACAF W Championship	
54	11 July 2022	Estadio BBVA, Guadalupe, Mexico	Haiti	3–0	4–0	2022 CONCACAF W Championship	
55	13 November 2022	National Stadium, Kingston, Jamaica	Paraguay	1–2	1–2	Friendly	
56	3 December 2024	Montego Bay Sports Complex, Montego Bay, Jamaica	South Africa	2–0	3–0	Friendly	
57	3 December 2024	Montego Bay Sports Complex, Montego Bay, Jamaica	South Africa	3–0	3–0	Friendly	
58	29 November 2025	Daren Sammy Cricket Ground, Gros Islet, Saint Lucia	Dominica	2–0	18–0	2026 CONCACAF W Championship qualification	
59	29 November 2025	Daren Sammy Cricket Ground, Gros Islet, Saint Lucia	Dominica	9–0	18–0	2026 CONCACAF W Championship qualification	
60	29 November 2025	Daren Sammy Cricket Ground, Gros Islet, Saint Lucia	Dominica	10–0	18–0	2026 CONCACAF W Championship qualification	
61	2 March 2026	Estadio Nacional, Managua, Nicaragua	Nicaragua	1–1	3–2	2026 CONCACAF W Championship qualification	
62	2 March 2026	Estadio Nacional, Managua, Nicaragua	Nicaragua	2–1	3–2	2026 CONCACAF W Championship qualification	
63	10 April 2026	National Stadium, Kingstown, Jamaica	Antigua and Barbuda	1–0	4–0	2026 CONCACAF W Championship qualification	
64	10 April 2026	National Stadium, Kingstown, Jamaica	Antigua and Barbuda	2–0	4–0	2026 CONCACAF W Championship qualification	
65	10 April 2026	National Stadium, Kingstown, Jamaica	Antigua and Barbuda	3–0	4–0	2026 CONCACAF W Championship qualification	
66	18 April 2026	National Stadium, Kingstown, Jamaica	Guyana	1–0	2–0	2026 CONCACAF W Championship qualification	
67	9 October 2026	Estadio Victoria, Aguascalientes, Mexico	Mexico	2–0	4–3	Friendly	

== Honours ==
Manchester City

- Women's Super League: 2025–26
- Women's FA Cup: 2025–26 Runner-up: 2021–22
- FA Women's League Cup: 2021–22

Jamaica

- CONCACAF Women's Championship third place: 2018, 2022

Individual

- CONCACAF Female Player of the Year: 2022, runner-up: 2018
- CONCACAF W Championship Best XI: 2022
- CONCACAF Women's Best XI: 2018
- Première Ligue top scorer: 2020–2021
- Première Ligue Player of the Month: October 2020, January 2021
- Trophées FFF D1 Féminine – Team of the Year: 2020–2021
- WSL Player of the Month: October 2022, March 2023, December 2023
- WSL Goal of the Month: January 2024
- WSL Player of the Season: 2023–24 2025–26
- WSL Golden Boot: 2023–24, 2024–25 2025–26
- PFA WSL Fans' Player of the Month: January 2022
- Manchester City Player of the Season: 2022–23
- Manchester City Goal of the Season: 2022–23
- PFA Women's Players' Player of the Year: 2023–24, 2025–26
- PFA WSL Team of the Year: 2022–23, 2023–24, 2025–26
- FWA Women's Footballer of the Year: 2023–24, 2025–26
- Women's Football Awards Player of the Year: 2024

Orders

- rank of Commander (CD): Order of Distinction: 2020

=== Awards and recognition ===
In 2018, Shaw was named The Guardian Footballer of the Year, an award given to a footballer "who has done something truly remarkable, whether by overcoming adversity, helping others or setting a sporting example by acting with exceptional honesty."
