= 2022 CONCACAF Awards =

2021 North American association football award

CONCACAF Awards 2022
- Website: concacaf.com

The shortlists for the 2022 CONCACAF Awards were announced on 17 March 2023.

The winners were announced on 5 May 2023.

== Men's football awards ==
=== Player of the Year ===
Rank	Player	Club(s)
1	(Canada) Alphonso Davies	(Germany) Bayern Munich
	(United States) Tyler Adams	(Germany) RB Leipzig (England) Leeds United
	(Jamaica) Andre Blake	(United States) Philadelphia Union
	(Canada) Jonathan David	(France) Lille
	(Mexico) Guillermo Ochoa	(Mexico) América (Italy) Salernitana
	(United States) Christian Pulisic	(England) Chelsea

== Women's football awards ==
=== Player of the Year ===
Rank	Player	Club(s)
1	(Jamaica) Khadija Shaw	(England) Manchester City
	(Mexico) Alicia Cervantes	(Mexico) Guadalajara
	(Haiti) Melchie Dumornay	(France) Reims
	(Canada) Jessie Fleming	(England) Chelsea
	(United States) Alex Morgan	(United States) San Diego Wave FC
	(United States) Sophia Smith	(United States) Portland Thorns FC
