= FWA Women's Footballer of the Year =

Annual football award in England

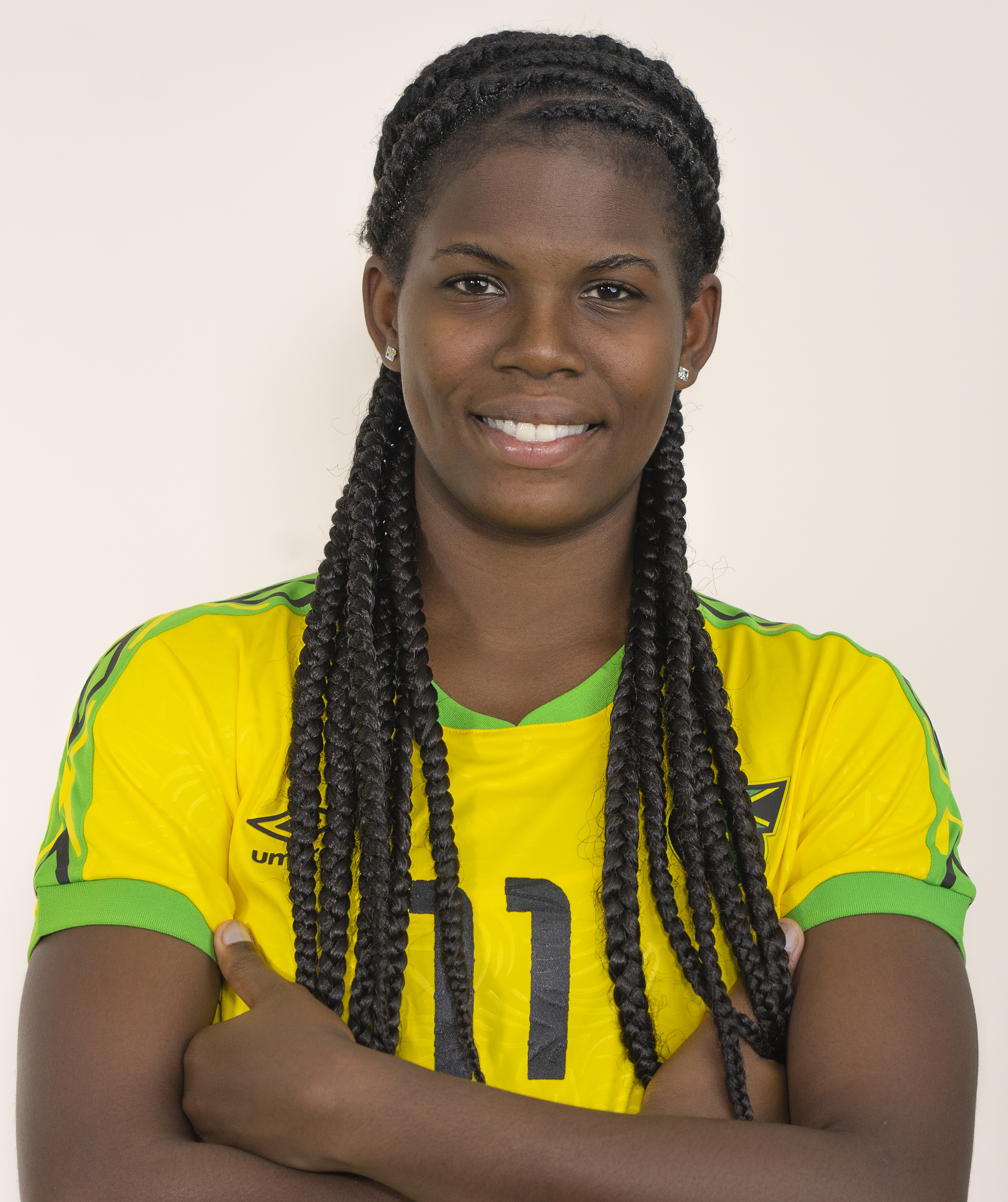
- Khadija Shaw won the award in 2026.
- Sport: Association football
- Competition: All levels of English women's football
- Country: England and Wales
- Presented by: FWA

History
- First award: 2018
- Editions: 9
- First winner: (England) Fran Kirby
- Most recent: (Jamaica) Khadija Shaw
- Website: footballwriters.co.uk/awards

The Football Writers' Association Women's Footballer of the Year (often called the FWA Women's Footballer of the Year, or in England simply the Women's Footballer of the Year) is an annual award given to the player who is voted as the best of the season in English football. The award has been presented since the 2017–18 season, with the inaugural winner being Chelsea forward Fran Kirby. The most recent winner of the award as of 2025–26, is Khadija Shaw of Manchester City.

The winner is selected by a vote amongst the members of the Football Writers' Association (FWA), which comprises around 400 football journalists based throughout England.

== Winners ==
Fran Kirby was the first player to win the award twice. Sam Kerr was the first player to win the award twice in a row.

Year	Nat.	Player	Club	Also won	Notes
2017–18	(England)	Fran Kirby	Chelsea	WPPY	
2018–19	(England)	Nikita Parris	Manchester City		
2019–20	(Netherlands)	Vivianne Miedema	Arsenal		
2020–21	(England)	Fran Kirby (2)	Chelsea	WPPY	
2021–22	(Australia)	Sam Kerr	Chelsea	WPPY	
2022–23	(Australia)	Sam Kerr (2)	Chelsea		
2023–24	(Jamaica)	Khadija Shaw	Manchester City		
2024–25	(England)	Alessia Russo	Arsenal		
2025–26	(Jamaica)	Khadija Shaw (2)	Manchester City		

== Breakdown of winners ==
=== By country ===
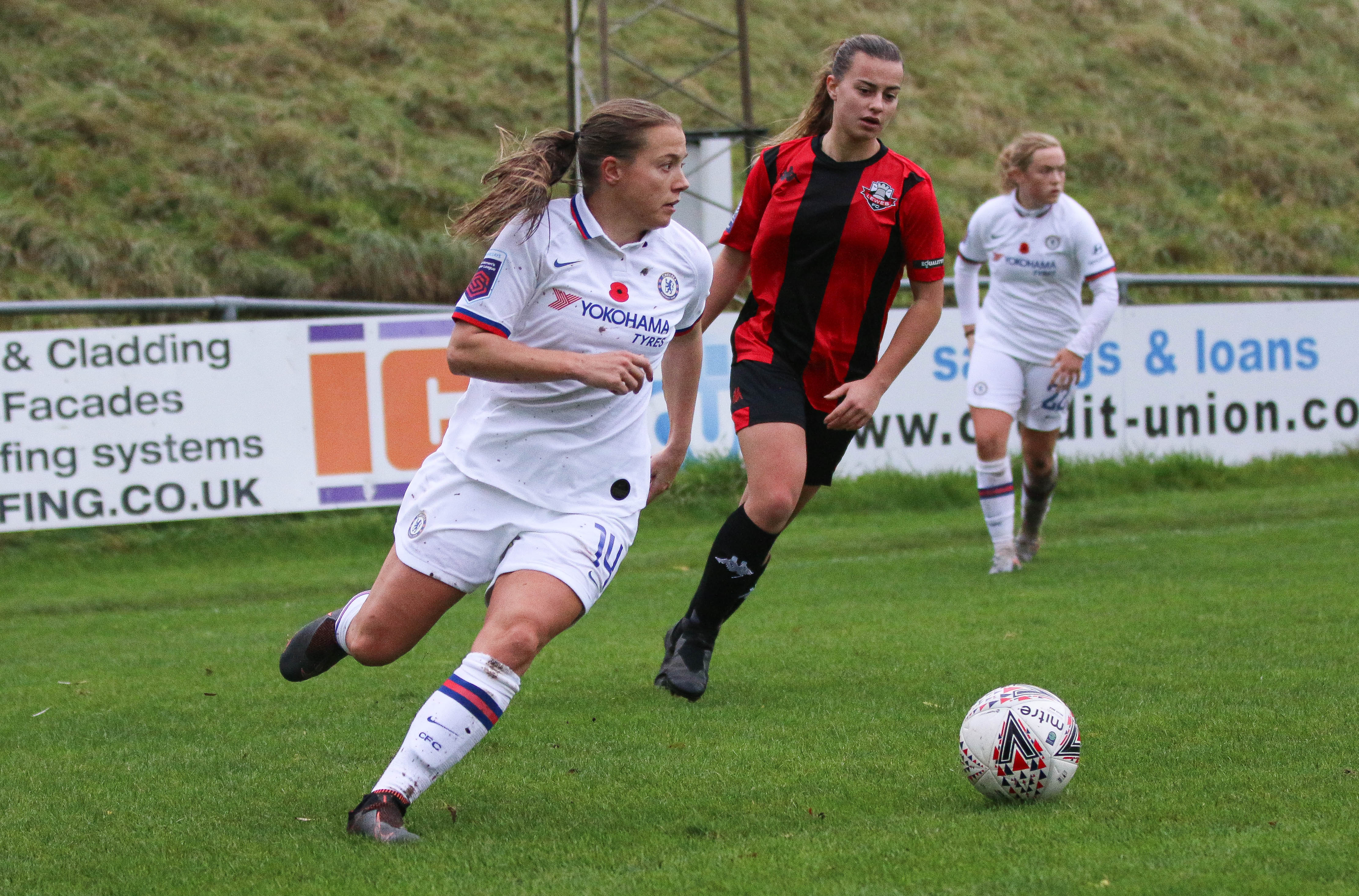
Fran Kirby was the inaugural winner in 2018 following a remarkable season with Chelsea

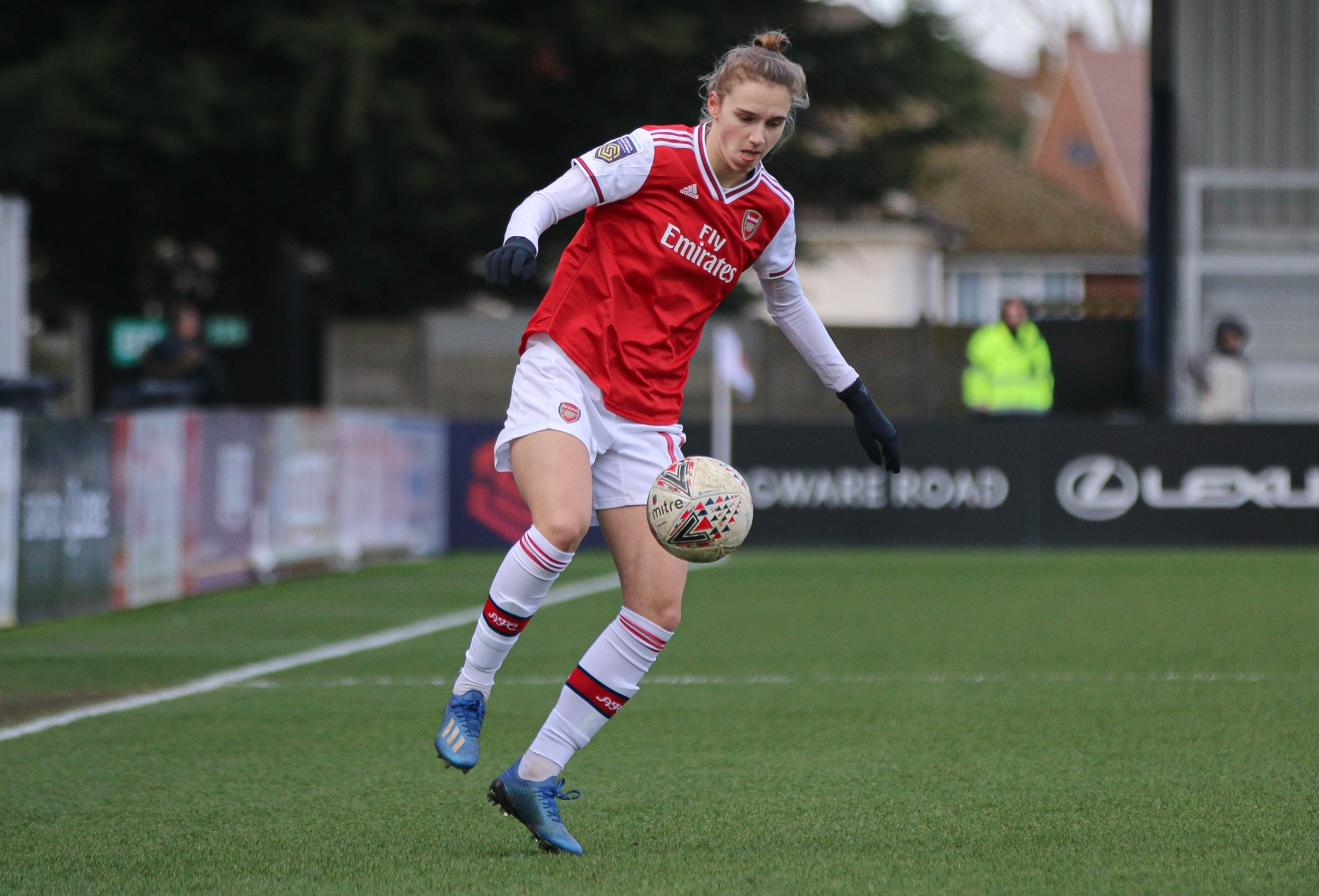
Vivianne Miedema of Arsenal and the Netherlands won in 2020

Country	Number of wins	Winning years
England	4	2017–18, 2018–19, 2020–21, 2024–25
Australia	2	2021–22, 2022–23
Jamaica	2	2023–24, 2025–26
Netherlands	1	2019–20

=== Winners by club ===
Club	Number of wins	Winning years
Chelsea	4	2017–18, 2020–21, 2021–22, 2022–23
Manchester City	3	2018–19, 2023–24, 2025–26
Arsenal	2	2019–20, 2024–25

== See also ==
- PFA Women's Players' Player of the Year
