= Fran Kirby =

English footballer (born 1993)

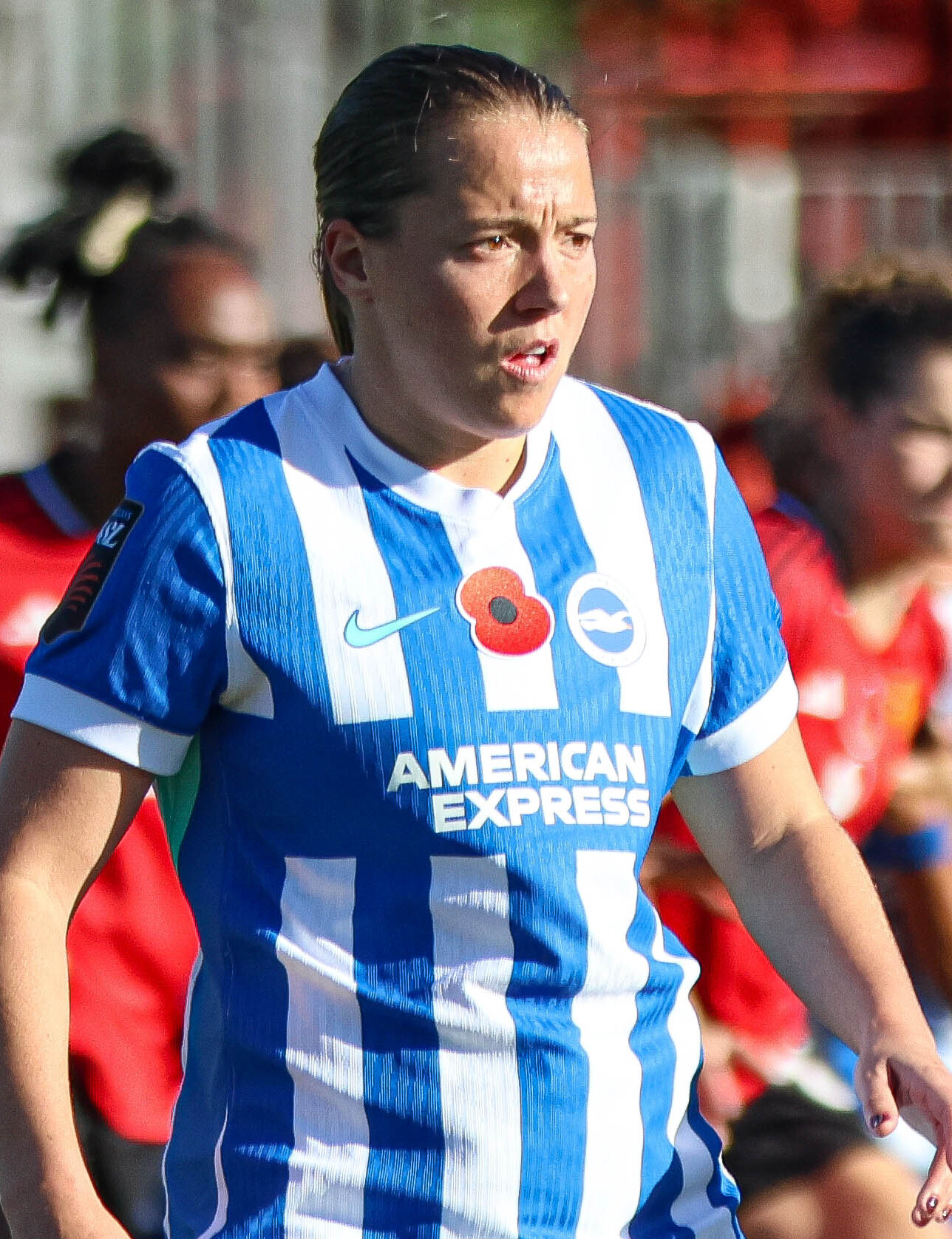
- Kirby with Brighton & Hove Albion in 2025

Personal information
- Full name: Francesca Kirby
- Date of birth: 29 June 1993 (age 33)
- Place of birth: Reading, England
- Height: 5 ft 2 in (1.57 m)
- Positions: Forward; attacking midfielder

Team information
- Current team: Brighton & Hove Albion
- Number: 14

Youth career
- 2001–2010: Reading

Senior career*
Years	Team	Apps	(Gls)
2012–2015	Reading	43	(68)
2015–2024	Chelsea	114	(63)
2024–	Brighton & Hove Albion	45	(12)

International career^{‡}
2013–2014	England U23	4	(1)
2014–2025	England	77	(19)
2021	Great Britain	2	(0)
Medal record
Women's football
Representing England
FIFA Women's World Cup
Bronze medal – third place	2015 Canada
UEFA Women's Championship
Winner	2022 England
Representing Great Britain
Summer Universiade
Gold medal – first place	2013 Kazan	Team
- * Club domestic league appearances and goals as of 22 November 2026 ‡ National team caps and goals as of 30 May 2025

Francesca Kirby (/fɹænˈsɛskə/; born 29 June 1993) is an English professional footballer who plays as an attacking midfielder for Women's Super League club Brighton & Hove Albion.

She began her career with hometown club Reading, before moving to Chelsea in July 2015, where she remained until 2024. In August 2014, Kirby won her first senior cap for the England national team. She represented her country at the 2015 FIFA World Cup in Canada, the 2019 FIFA World Cup in France, the UEFA Euro 2017 in the Netherlands and the UEFA Euro 2022 in England (winning the final).

For the 2017–18 season, Kirby was awarded her first PFA Women's Players' Player of the Year award alongside the inaugural Football Writers' Women's Footballer of the Year, winning both awards again in the 2020–21 season. She was named to the shortlist for the Ballon d'Or in 2021, ranking 10th. She was also named to the Top 10 of The Guardian's The 100 Best Female Footballers In The World in 2021, ranking seventh. As of May 2024, when it was announced that Kirby would be leaving Chelsea at the end of the 2023–24 season, she holds the record as the club's leading goalscorer, with 116 goals, holding this record since December 2020.

== Early life ==
[My mum] used to tell a story about taking me to the doctors for a couple of tests. The doctor threw a tennis ball to see how I would react. I think I was supposed to just catch it, but I kicked it straight back to him. I was three years old. My mum just went, "O.K., ... I thinks she wants to be a footballer."

— Fran Kirby

Born and raised in Reading with her brother Jamie and parents Denise and Steve, Kirby began playing football as a young girl after watching her brother play. She would play any chance she got: at school, in the street, in the front garden. At an early age, her mother, Denise, wrote in a birthday card that Fran would play in a World Cup one day: she was her biggest supporter.

Kirby attended Caversham Park Primary School and Chiltern Edge, Sonning Common where she played against boys. As part of the "Where Greatness Is Made" campaign, a plaque honouring Kirby was installed at local club Caversham Trents. At age 7, she joined Reading's academy and made her senior debut at 16.

== Club career ==
=== Reading, 2012–15 ===
Kirby joined her hometown club Reading at the age of seven and worked her way through the youth teams. She made her debut for the first team at the age of 16 but quit football the following year after an onset of depression, brought about by the death of her mother. Kirby returned to the club in 2012 and went on to become the FA Women's Premier League Southern Division's top scorer for the 2012–13 season, with 32 goals in 21 appearances.

With Reading promoted to the newly formed Women's Super League 2 for 2014, Kirby helped the team achieve third place with 24 goals in 16 appearances. She ended the season as the league's top goalscorer; netting four against London Bees, as well as hat-tricks against Durham, Watford and Doncaster Rovers Belles. Shortly after, she became the first female player to receive a professional contract from the club. At the 2014 FA Women's Awards, Kirby was named the inaugural WSL2 Players' Player of the Year.

Kirby continued her goalscoring form into the 2015 WSL2 season, taking 11 goals in five league appearances for Reading, including all four goals in a 4–2 away win against Yeovil Town and five goals in a 7–0 win against London Bees. Following the 2015 FIFA World Cup, Reading accepted an undisclosed transfer fee from Chelsea and she completed a move in July 2015. It was reported that the fee of between £40,000 and £60,000 constituted a British record, although Chelsea denied this was the case and Kirby was not aware of the figure.

=== Chelsea, 2015–24 ===
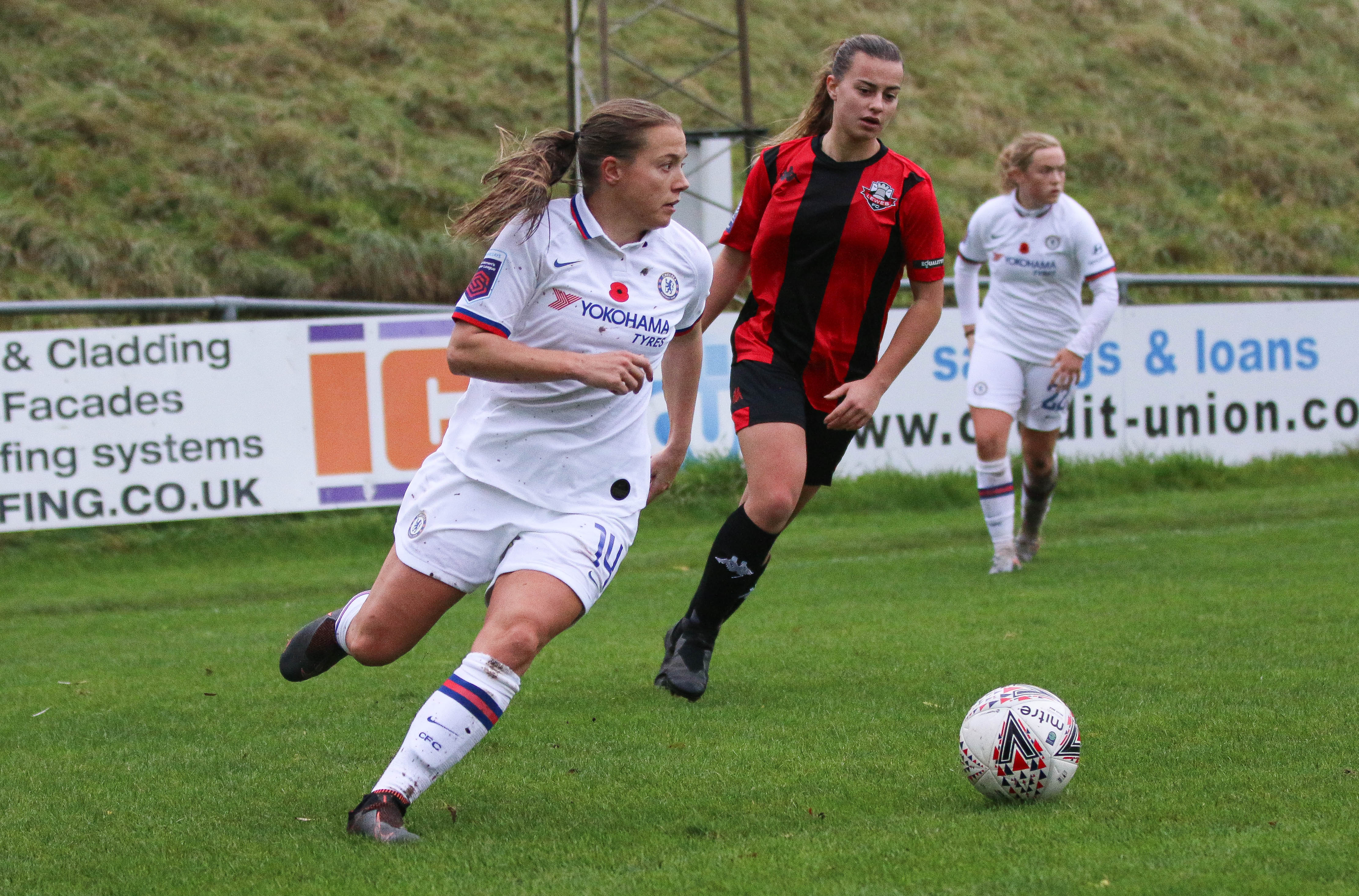
Kirby during a 2019–20 FA Women's League Cup match, November 2019

At the 2015 FA Women's Cup final, staged at Wembley Stadium for the first time, Kirby was a cup-tied spectator for Chelsea's 1–0 win over Notts County. It was Chelsea's first major trophy. In October 2015, she scored twice in Chelsea's 4–0 win over Sunderland which secured the club's first FA WSL title; a league and cup double. The same month, Kirby scored Chelsea's first ever UEFA Women's Champions League goal in a 1–0 win over Glasgow City.

Kirby's form extended into the 2016 FA WSL season. In April, she secured Chelsea's return to Wembley Stadium by scoring a late, extra-time winner against Manchester City in the FA Women's Cup semi-final. Four days later, she scored both goals in Chelsea's 2–0 WSL win at Arsenal.

On 22 April 2018, Kirby was awarded the PFA Women's Players' Player of the Year and the Football Writers' Women's Footballer of the Year for the 2017–18 season.

In February 2020, Chelsea announced that Kirby was diagnosed with pericarditis, which had ruled her out of the team since November 2019. She overcame her infection, despite being told by cardiologists that she may never play again, and played 70 minutes in Chelsea's FA Community Shield win against Manchester City on 29 August 2020. On 9 December 2020, Kirby's 2 goals in a 5–0 win against Benfica in the UEFA Women's Champions League, saw her overtake Eniola Aluko as Chelsea's all-time goal scorer, with her 69th and 70th goals for the club, five years after signing.

During a match against her former club, Reading on 10 January 2021, Kirby scored four goals lifting Chelsea to a 5–0 win. In the 2021 FA Women's League Cup final match against Bristol City W.F.C., Kirby scored two goals and created four assists as defending champions Chelsea won 6–0 at Vicarage Road.

Kirby was singled out by observers as the top performer for Chelsea during their double-winning 2020–21 campaign. She later won FWA's 2021 Women's Footballer of the Year award. On 5 December, Kirby scored the opening goal in the delayed 2020–21 FA Cup final against Arsenal, helping her team lift the trophy and secure the domestic quadruple of the 2020–21 season, the first English women's club to achieve the feat.

In the 2023–24 League Cup quarterfinal, Kirby scored two goals and made two assists in the 5–0 win against Sunderland.

On 4 May 2024, it was announced that Kirby would leave Chelsea at the end of the 2023–24 season.

=== Brighton & Hove Albion, 2024–present ===
Kirby signed for Brighton & Hove Albion on 4 July 2024.

On 22 February 2026, she scored and provided an assist in Brighton's 2–1 win over West Ham United, helping her team to reach the quarterfinals of the FA Cup in a performance described as having "rolled back the years".

== International career ==
Kirby in 2019

Early in her career, Kirby was a member of the England under-23 squad. She became the first WSL 2 player to be called up to the senior squad, in June 2014 for the World Cup qualifiers against Belarus and Ukraine. She was named on the substitutes' bench against Belarus but did not make an appearance. She made her senior international debut against Sweden in August 2014, getting the second goal in a 4–0 friendly win at Victoria Park, Hartlepool.

In May 2015, England manager Mark Sampson named Kirby in his final squad for the 2015 FIFA Women's World Cup, hosted in Canada. She scored in England's 2–1 win over Mexico and was hailed "mini Messi" by Sampson. Although Kirby was disappointed to be ruled out by injury from the quarter-finals onwards, England's eventual third-place finish left her with a positive overall impression of the tournament: "a fantastic experience and one I won't forget in a hurry."

Sampson kept Kirby in the national team for the UEFA Euro 2017 qualifying campaign. In Estonia on 21 September 2015 she scored twice in England's 8–0 win. After "12 months of hell" caused by knee and ankle injuries, Kirby returned to England's line-up for UEFA Euro 2017 in the Netherlands. In England's opening fixture against rivals Scotland, second striker Kirby's clever dummy sent Jodie Taylor through to score England's opening goal in a 6–0 rout. In the next match Kirby and Taylor scored in a 2–0 win over Spain, which secured England's place in the quarter-final. When England were thrashed 3–0 by the hosts in the semi-final, Kirby was rueful: "We had chances and could have had a few penalties. We are bitterly disappointed".

On 6 October 2018, Kirby scored in England's 1–0 friendly win over Brazil at Meadow Lane. In post-match interviews England coach Phil Neville breathlessly proclaimed Kirby's superiority to six-time World Player of the Year Marta: "I'd take my No 10 over Brazil's No 10, that's for sure".

In June 2022, Kirby was included in the England squad which won the UEFA Euro 2022.

Kirby was allotted 186 when the FA announced their legacy numbers scheme to honour the 50th anniversary of England's inaugural international.

In 2023, Kirby confirmed that she would miss the upcoming FIFA World Cup 2023 due to requiring surgery for an ongoing knee problem.

In March 2025, Kirby was called up to the 2025 UEFA Nations League squad for the matches against Belgium, after missing the first two matches due to injury. On 3 April, it was announced Kirby would miss the first of the two matches due to a minor injury.

On 3 June 2025, she announced her retirement from international play.

=== Great Britain ===
Kirby was hailed as a "stand out player" in Great Britain's gold medal-winning team at the 2013 Summer Universiade in Kazan, Russia. She went on to represent Great Britain at the delayed 2020 Tokyo Olympics.

== Personal life ==
While growing up, Kirby was very close to her mother Denise. When Kirby was 14, Denise died suddenly from a brain haemorrhage. Two years later, Kirby experienced a deep depression, and stated that she "just could not comprehend what had happened. And it stayed like that for many years." Away with England U17, Kirby broke down because she "missed [her] mum". She returned home and dropped out of football. She later reflected that "I'd have days where I wouldn't get out of bed. Or I wouldn't go to college. I could get as far as the bus stop, then I'd just break down crying." One day, one of her friends invited her to play with her amateur team, where she found her love for football again.

In October 2019, Kirby received the honorary degree of Doctor of Science (D.Sc.) from the University of Winchester for her "achievements both on and off the field, in particular her work supporting mental health and wellbeing."

In February 2020, Chelsea revealed Kirby had successfully recovered from pericarditis, a potentially career-ending illness. Kirby had fallen ill in November 2019 and came close to retiring from the game as a result.

In April 2020, Kirby was named in Diva magazine's Visible Lesbian 100 list during Lesbian Visibility Week.

In April 2022, Kirby stated on Twitter that she had been dealing with an "on-going issue" throughout her career and wanted to "put [her] health first". Emma Hayes, the then manager of Chelsea Women, clarified during a press conference that Kirby had been "suffering a lot with fatigue", yet the cause was unknown.

== Career statistics ==
=== Club ===
As of match played 22 November 2026

Appearances and goals by club, season and competition
Club	Season	League			Cup (Note: Includes Women's FA Cup and FA Women's League Cup)		Continental		Total	
Club	Season	Division	Apps	Goals	Apps	Goals	Apps	Goals	Apps	Goals
Reading	2012-13	WPLS	14	21	7	11	—		21	32
Reading	2014	WSL 2	16	24	4	4	—		20	28
Reading	2015	WSL 2	5	11	0	0	—		5	11
Reading	Total		35	56	11	15	—		46	71
Chelsea	2015	WSL	5	4	3	3	4 (Note: Appearances in the UEFA Women's Champions League)	2	12	9
Chelsea	2016	WSL	7	5	0	0	—		7	5
Chelsea	2017	WSL	5	6	0	0	—		5	6
Chelsea	2017–18	WSL	17	8	6	7	8	4	31	19
Chelsea	2018–19	WSL	16	9	5	4	8	5	29	18
Chelsea	2019–20	WSL	4	0	2	0	—		6	0
Chelsea	2020–21	WSL	18	16	7	6	9	6	34	28
Chelsea	2021–22	WSL	13	6	3	0	6	2	22	8
Chelsea	2022–23	WSL	8	6	3	2	5	1	16	9
Chelsea	2023–24	WSL	21	3	5	2	7	1	33	6
Chelsea	Total		114	63	34	24	47	21	195	108
Brighton & Hove Albion	2024–25	WSL	17	7	1	1	—		18	8
Brighton & Hove Albion	2025–26	WSL	17	2	5	2	—		23	4
Brighton & Hove Albion	2026–27	WSL	11	3	2	0	—		13	3
Brighton & Hove Albion	Total		45	12	8	3	—		54	15
Career totals			194	131	53	42	47	21	295	194

=== International ===
As of match played 30 May 2025

Year	England		Great Britain	
Year	Apps	Goals	Apps	Goals
2014	3	1	—N/a	
2015	12	4	—N/a	
2016	3	0	—N/a	
2017	8	4	—N/a	
2018	8	3	—N/a	
2019	11	1	—N/a	
2021	6	1	2	0
2022	14	3	—N/a	
2023	4	2	—N/a	
2024	6	0	—N/a	
2025	2	0	—N/a	
Total	77	19	2	0

As of match played 5 December 2023
Scores and results list England's goal tally first, score column indicates score after each Kirby goal.

List of international goals scored by Fran Kirby
No.	Date	Venue	Opponent	Score	Result	Competition	Ref.
1	3 August 2014	Victoria Park, Hartlepool, England	Sweden	2–0	4–0	Friendly	
2	9 April 2015	Academy Stadium, Manchester, England	China	2–0	2–1	Friendly	
3	13 June 2015	Moncton Stadium, Moncton, Canada	Mexico	1–0	2–1	2015 FIFA Women's World Cup	
4	21 September 2015	A. Le Coq Arena, Tallinn, Estonia	Estonia	3–0	8–0	UEFA Women's Euro 2017 qualifying	
5	21 September 2015	A. Le Coq Arena, Tallinn, Estonia	Estonia	6–0	8–0	UEFA Women's Euro 2017 qualifying	
6	10 June 2017	Tissot Arena, Biel, Switzerland	Switzerland	2–0	4–0	Friendly	
7	23 July 2017	Rat Verlegh Stadion, Breda, Netherlands	Spain	1–0	2–0	UEFA Women's Euro 2017	
8	24 November 2017	Bescot Stadium, Walsall, England	Bosnia and Herzegovina	4–0	4–0	2019 FIFA Women's World Cup qualification	
9	28 November 2017	Colchester Community Stadium, Colchester, England	Kazakhstan	2–0	5–0	2019 FIFA Women's World Cup qualification	
10	1 March 2018	Mapfre Stadium, Columbus, Ohio, United States	France	4–0	4–1	2018 SheBelieves Cup	
11	6 October 2018	Meadow Lane, Nottingham, England	Brazil	1–0	1–0	Friendly	
12	9 October 2018	Craven Cottage, London, England	Australia	1–0	1–1	Friendly	
13	6 July 2019	Allianz Riviera, Nice, France	Sweden	1–2	1–2	2019 FIFA Women's World Cup	
14	9 April 2021	Stade Michel d'Ornano, Caen, France	France	1–2	1–3	Friendly	
15	23 February 2022	Molineux Stadium, Wolverhampton, England	Germany	3–1	3–1	2022 Arnold Clark Cup	
16	15 July 2022	St Mary's Stadium, Southampton, England	Northern Ireland	1–0	5–0	UEFA Women's Euro 2022	
17	26 July 2022	Bramall Lane, Sheffield, England	Sweden	4–0	4–0	UEFA Women's Euro 2022	
18	31 October 2023	Den Dreef, Leuven, Belgium	Belgium	2–1	2–3	2023–24 UEFA Women's Nations League A	
19	5 December 2023	Hampden Park, Glasgow, Scotland	Scotland	5–0	6–0	2023–24 UEFA Women's Nations League A	

== Honours ==
Chelsea

- FA Women's Super League: 2015, Spring Series, 2017–18, 2019–20, 2020–21, 2021–22, 2022–23, 2023–24
- FA Women's Cup: 2014–15, 2017–18, 2020–21, 2021–22, 2022–23
- FA Women's League Cup: 2019–20, 2020–21
- FA Women's Community Shield: 2020
- UEFA Women's Champion's League runners-up: 2020–21

England

- FIFA Women's World Cup: third place 2015
- UEFA Women's Championship: 2022

Individual

- PFA Women's Players' Player of the Year: 2017–18, 2020–21
- PFA WSL 1 Team of the Year: 2017–18, 2020–21
- FWA Women's Footballer of the Year: 2017–18, 2020–21
- FA Women's Super League Player of the Month: January 2021, September 2021
- London Football Awards Women's Super League Player of the Year: 2020–21
- FA Women's Super League Player of the Year: 2020–21
- Chelsea Player of the Year: 2017–18, 2020–21
- Brighton & Hove Albion Player of the Season: 2024–25,
- Freedom of the City of London (announced 1 August 2022)

Records

- All-time leading scorer for Chelsea Women: 101

== See also ==
- List of UEFA Women's Championship goalscorers
- List of England women's international footballers
- List of Women's Super League hat-tricks
- List of people from Reading, Berkshire
