= Rachel Daly =

English footballer (born 1991)

Rachel Daly MBE
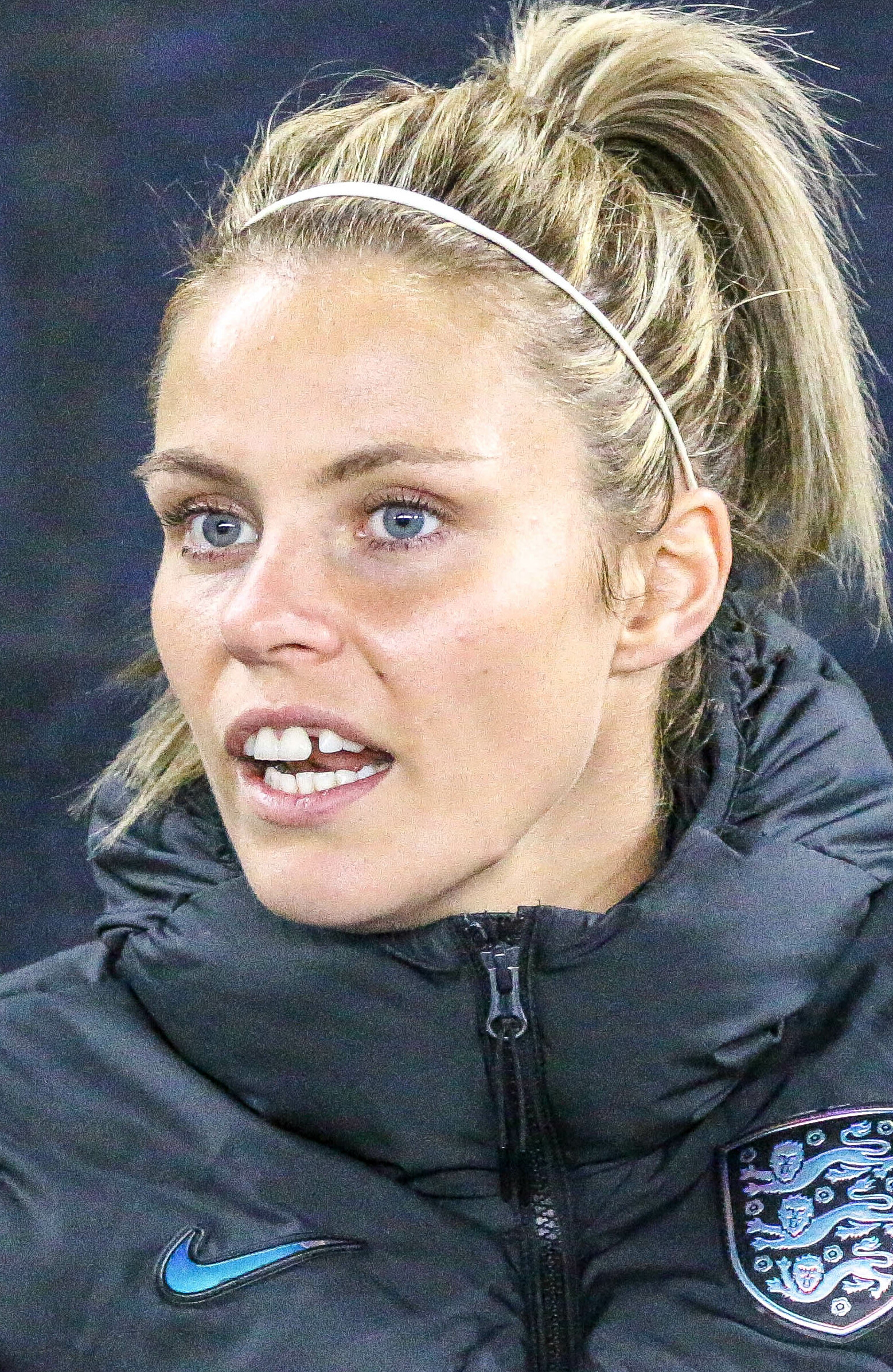
- Daly with England in 2022

Personal information
- Full name: Rachel Ann Daly
- Date of birth: 6 December 1991 (age 34)
- Place of birth: Harrogate, England
- Height: 5 ft 6 in (1.67 m)
- Positions: Striker; left wing-back

Team information
- Current team: Aston Villa
- Number: 9

Youth career
- Leeds United

College career
Years	Team	Apps	(Gls)
2012–2015	St. John's Red Storm	60	(50)

Senior career*
Years	Team	Apps	(Gls)
2008–2010	Leeds United		
2011–2012	Lincoln Ladies	24	(4)
2013	Los Angeles Strikers		
2014	LA Blues		
2015	SoCal FC		
2016–2022	Houston Dash	101	(37)
2020	→ West Ham United (loan)	9	(3)
2022–	Aston Villa	79	(41)

International career^{‡}
2008	England U17	4	(0)
2014	England U23	2	(0)
2016–2024	England	84	(16)
2021–2024	Great Britain	4	(0)
Medal record
Women's football
Representing England
UEFA Women's Championship
Winner	2022 England
UEFA–CONMEBOL Finalissima
Winner	2023 England
FIFA Women's World Cup
Runner-up	2023 Australia and New Zealand
- * Club domestic league appearances and goals as of 17:05, 13 May 2025 (UTC) ‡ National team caps and goals as of 23:15, 9 April 2024 (UTC)

Rachel Ann Daly (born 6 December 1991) is an English professional footballer who plays predominantly as a striker for Aston Villa in the FA Women's Super League. Having spent most of her career with Houston Dash in the NWSL, she spent her youth career at Leeds United, for which she also made her senior debut. She represented England and Great Britain.

A versatile player, since 2019 Daly has played in defence, midfield, and attack. With Leeds United she won the Premier League Cup in 2010; with Houston Dash she won the NWSL Challenge Cup in 2020, as well as the Golden Boot and MVP awards for the competition. In her first season with Aston Villa, Daly became the WSL Golden Boot winner, PFA Women's Players' Player of the Year, Player of the Season, was featured in the Team of the Year, and twice won the Player of the Month award for the 2022–23 season. She holds the joint record for most goals in a WSL season, with 22 goals.

Playing at all youth levels for England, Daly scored her first senior international goal on her debut in June 2016. With England, she made 84 appearances, winning the Euro 2022 and the 2023 Women's Finalissima, and taking silver at the 2023 World Cup.

== College career ==
Despite playing just three years for the St. John's University Red Storm from 2012 to 2015, Daly set the school's career records for both goals (50) and points (111). As a freshman, she did not see game action due to NCAA compliance regulations. During her second year, she played and started in all 21 games and set St. John's single-season records in goals (23) and points (50), becoming the program's first-ever player to be named a NSCAA All-American, after earning Second Team honours.

As a junior, she was the team's leading player in points with 18, including eight goals and two assists. As a senior, she appeared in 20 games, making 19 starts, and finished as the leading scorer on the team with 19 goals and five assists for a total of 18 points. She became the first player in program history to be selected to the NSCAA All-America First Team and the first to be named a semifinalist for the Hermann Trophy.

== Club career ==
=== Youth ===
Coming from the youth department of Leeds United LFC, Daly initially played in the English League for Leeds United and Lincoln Ladies at a young age. She played for the W-League franchises Los Angeles Strikers and Los Angeles Blues in 2013 and 2014. With the latter she won the W-League championship with a clear 6–1 in the final over the Washington Spirit reserve team. After another season with WPSL participant SoCal FC, Daly took part in the college draft for the 2016 season of the NWSL after graduating.

=== Houston Dash ===
Daly was selected by NWSL club Houston Dash as the sixth overall pick of the 2016 NWSL College Draft. The NWSL Media Association voted Daly Player of the Week for the first week of the season after she contributed a goal and an assist in the Dash's 3–1 win against the Chicago Red Stars. She appeared in 16 games in the 2016 season, tallying four goals and four assists. She was one of three finalists for NWSL Rookie of the Year.

Daly returned to the Dash for the 2017 season, appearing in 23 games and scoring five goals. On 20 November 2017, the Houston Dash announced that Daly had signed a new contract with the club.

In the 2018 season, Daly was named Player of the Week for week nine, as well as Player of the Month for the month of May. Daly started all 24 games for the Dash and scored a career high 10 goals. She was voted team MVP and named to the NWSL Second XI for the 2018 season.

Daly was named captain of the Dash ahead of the 2020 NWSL Challenge Cup. The Dash won the Cup, their first trophy, after a 2–0 win over the Chicago Red Stars in the final. Daly won the tournament Golden Boot and on 25 July 2020 was named tournament MVP.

==== Loan to West Ham United ====
On 3 September 2020, Daly joined West Ham United on a loan that expired 11 January 2021.

=== Aston Villa ===
On 9 August 2022, it was announced that Daly had signed a three-year deal with Aston Villa. She made her competitive debut for the club on 18 September that year, scoring 2 goals in a 4–3 win over Manchester City. She scored her first hat-trick for the club in a 3–1 win over Reading at Villa Park two months later. She again scored a hat-trick in the reverse fixture against Reading in a 5–0 win at the Madejski Stadium. Daly scored 22 goals in the 2022–23 WSL season, winning the Golden Boot and equalling Vivianne Miedema's record for the most goals scored in a single season. She was awarded Player of the Season.

In the FA Cup she scored 6 goals in 4 games, including 4 in an 11–0 win versus AFC Fylde, finishing as the joint second top scorer alongside Sam Kerr and one goal behind top scorer Bunny Shaw.

On 24 August 2023, it was announced that Daly would change shirt number from 8 to 9.

On 31 May 2025, it was announced that Daly had signed a new contract, extending her time with the club to June 2027.

Following the announcement of her pregnancy in September 2026, Villa confirmed that Daly would be unavailable for match selection for the ''foreseeable future''.

== International career ==
Daly has represented England at the U-15, U-17, U-19, and U-23 levels. She was a member of England's U-17 World Cup team that finished fourth in New Zealand in 2008.

When Mark Sampson replaced Hope Powell as England coach, he named Daly in his first squad in December 2013. She won her first senior cap in June 2016, scoring in England's 7–0 Euro 2017 qualifying win over Serbia. Daly was left off Sampson's squad for the Euro 2017.

After not being called up for nearly a year, Daly was included in England's squad for the 2018 SheBelieves Cup by new head coach Phil Neville. Daly featured in four of England's World Cup qualifying games in 2018, as England won their group and qualified for the 2019 World Cup. She won the 2019 SheBelieves Cup with England, where she appeared in two games and played all 90 minutes in a 2–2 draw against the United States.

In July 2022 Daly was included, and started every game at left back, with the England squad which won the Euro 2022. In November 2022, she started her first international match as a forward during a series of friendlies in which manager Sarina Wiegman was trying out options to replace the perennial but recently-retired number 9 Ellen White, with Daly saying "she will play wherever Wiegman needs her".

On 19 February 2023, Daly was once again played as a centre-forward in an Arnold Clark Cup match against Italy: in the occasion, she scored a brace that helped England gain a 2–1 win. On 31 May 2023, Daly was named to the squad for the 2023 World Cup in July 2023 and scored the final goal in England's 6–1 defeat of China.

On 10 April 2024, the morning after appearing in England's 2–0 Euro 2025 qualifying win over Republic of Ireland, Daly announced her retirement from international football on her Instagram account. Daly made 84 appearances for England, scoring 16 times while playing in a variety of positions in attack and defence.

=== Great Britain Olympic ===
In May 2021, Daly was named to the Team GB squad as one of six defenders in the squad. She appeared in all four games for Team GB, starting in three of the games.

== Personal life ==
Daly previously dated Houston Dash teammate Kristie Mewis and England teammate Millie Turner. On 29 November 2024, she announced her engagement to then-Aston Villa teammate Sarah Mayling. On 12 September 2026, the pair announced via Instagram that they were expecting their first child in March 2027, with Aston Villa confirming Daly would be unavailable for match selection because of her pregnancy.

As part of the "Where Greatness Is Made" campaign, a plaque honouring Daly was installed at the Killinghall Nomads ground in Killinghall, Harrogate.

== Career statistics ==
=== College ===
As of match played 2015

Appearances and goals by College team and year
College team	Year	Apps	Goals
St. John's Red Storm	2013	21	23
St. John's Red Storm	2014	19	8
St. John's Red Storm	2015	20	19
Total		60	50

=== Club ===
As of match played 10 May 2025

Club	Season	League			FA Cup		League Cup		Continental		Total	
Club	Season	Division	Apps	Goals	Apps	Goals	Apps	Goals	Apps	Goals	Apps	Goals
Lincoln City Ladies	2011	WSL	14	2	0	0	0	0	—		14	2
Lincoln City Ladies	2012	WSL	10	2	1	0	3	0	—		14	2
Lincoln City Ladies	Total		24	4	1	0	3	0	—		28	4
Los Angeles Strikers	2013	USL W-League	Stats not available									
Los Angeles Blues	2014	USL W-League	Stats not available									
SoCal FC	2015	USL W-League	Stats not available									
Houston Dash	2016	NWSL	16	4	0	0	—		—		16	4
Houston Dash	2017	NWSL	23	5	0	0	—		—		23	5
Houston Dash	2018	NWSL	24	10	0	0	—		—		24	10
Houston Dash	2019	NWSL	17	5	0	0	—		—		17	5
Houston Dash	2020	NWSL	0	0	7	3	—		—		7	3
Houston Dash	2021	NWSL	15	9	2	1	—		2 (Note: Appearance(s) in Women's International Champions Cup)	0	19	10
Houston Dash	2022	NWSL	6	4	6	1	—		—		12	5
Houston Dash	Total		101	37	15	5	—		2	0	118	42
West Ham United (loan)	2020–21	WSL	9	3	0	0	3	2	—		12	5
Aston Villa	2022–23	WSL	22	22	4	6	4	2	—		30	30
Aston Villa	2023–24	WSL	20	8	1	0	4	8	—		25	16
Aston Villa	2024–25	WSL	22	8	3	3	3	2	—		28	13
Aston Villa	2025–26	WSL	15	3	0	0	3	1	—		18	4
Total			79	41	8	9	14	13	—		101	63
Career total			213	85	24	14	20	15	2	0	259	114

=== International ===
Statistics accurate as of match played 9 April 2024.

Year	England		Great Britain	
Year	Apps	Goals	Apps	Goals
2016	5	1	—N/a	
2017	0	0	—N/a	
2018	11	2	—N/a	
2019	17	0	—N/a	
2020	2	0	—N/a	
2021	8	4	4	0
2022	20	4	—N/a	
2023	18	3	—N/a	
2024	3	2	—N/a	
Total	84	16	4	0

Scores and results list England's goal tally first, score column indicates score after each Daly goal.

List of international goals scored by Rachel Daly
No.	Date	Venue	Opponent	Score	Result	Competition
1	4 June 2016	Adams Park, High Wycombe, England	Serbia	3–0	7–0	UEFA Women's Euro 2017 qualifying
2	4 September 2018	Tsentralniy, Pavlodar, Kazakhstan	Kazakhstan	2–0	6–0	2019 FIFA Women's World Cup qualifying
3	8 November 2018	BSFZ-Arena, Maria Enzersdorf, Austria	Austria	3–0	3–0	Friendly
4	23 February 2021	St. George's Park, Burton upon Trent, England	Northern Ireland	5–0	6–0	Friendly
5	21 September 2021	Stade de Luxembourg, Luxembourg City, Luxembourg	Luxembourg	9–0	10–0	2023 FIFA Women's World Cup qualifying
6	26 October 2021	Daugava Stadium, Riga, Latvia	Latvia	7–0	10–0	2023 FIFA Women's World Cup qualifying
7	26 October 2021	Daugava Stadium, Riga, Latvia	Latvia	10–0	10–0	2023 FIFA Women's World Cup qualifying
8	16 June 2022	Molineux Stadium, Wolverhampton, England	Belgium	2–0	3–0	Friendly
9	6 September 2022	Bet365 Stadium, Stoke-on-Trent, England	Luxembourg	4–0	10–0	2023 FIFA Women's World Cup qualifying
10	11 November 2022	Pinatar Arena, Murcia, Spain	Japan	1–0	4–0	Friendly
11	15 November 2022	Pinatar Arena, Murcia, Spain	Norway	1–0	1–1	Friendly
12	19 February 2023	Coventry Building Society Arena, Coventry, England	Italy	1–0	2–1	2023 Arnold Clark Cup
13	19 February 2023	Coventry Building Society Arena, Coventry, England	Italy	2–1	2–1	2023 Arnold Clark Cup
14	1 August 2023	Hindmarsh Stadium, Adelaide, Australia	China	6–1	6–1	2023 FIFA Women's World Cup
15	23 February 2024	Estadio Nuevo Mirador, Algeciras, Spain	Austria	7–2	7–2	Friendly
16	27 February 2024	Estadio Nuevo Mirador, Algeciras, Spain	Italy	5–1	5–1	Friendly

== Honours ==
Leeds United

- FA Women's Premier League Cup: 2010

Houston Dash

- NWSL Challenge Cup: 2020

England

- FIFA Women's World Cup runner-up: 2023
- UEFA Women's Championship: 2022
- Women's Finalissima: 2023
- SheBelieves Cup: 2019
- Arnold Clark Cup: 2022, 2023

Individual

- NWSL Second XI: 2018, 2021
- NWSL Challenge Cup Most Valuable Player: 2020
- NWSL Challenge Cup Best XI: 2020
- NWSL Challenge Cup Golden Boot: 2020
- PFA Women's Players' Player of the Year: 2022–23
- PFA Team of the Year: 2022–23 FA WSL
- WSL Player of the Month: September 2022, November 2022
- WSL Goal of the Month: November 2023
- WSL Player of the Season: 2022–23
- WSL Golden Boot: 2022–23

State and civic honours

- Member of the Order of the British Empire (MBE) for services to association football: 2025 Birthday Honours
