= PFA Women's Players' Player of the Year =

Annual English women's football (soccer) award

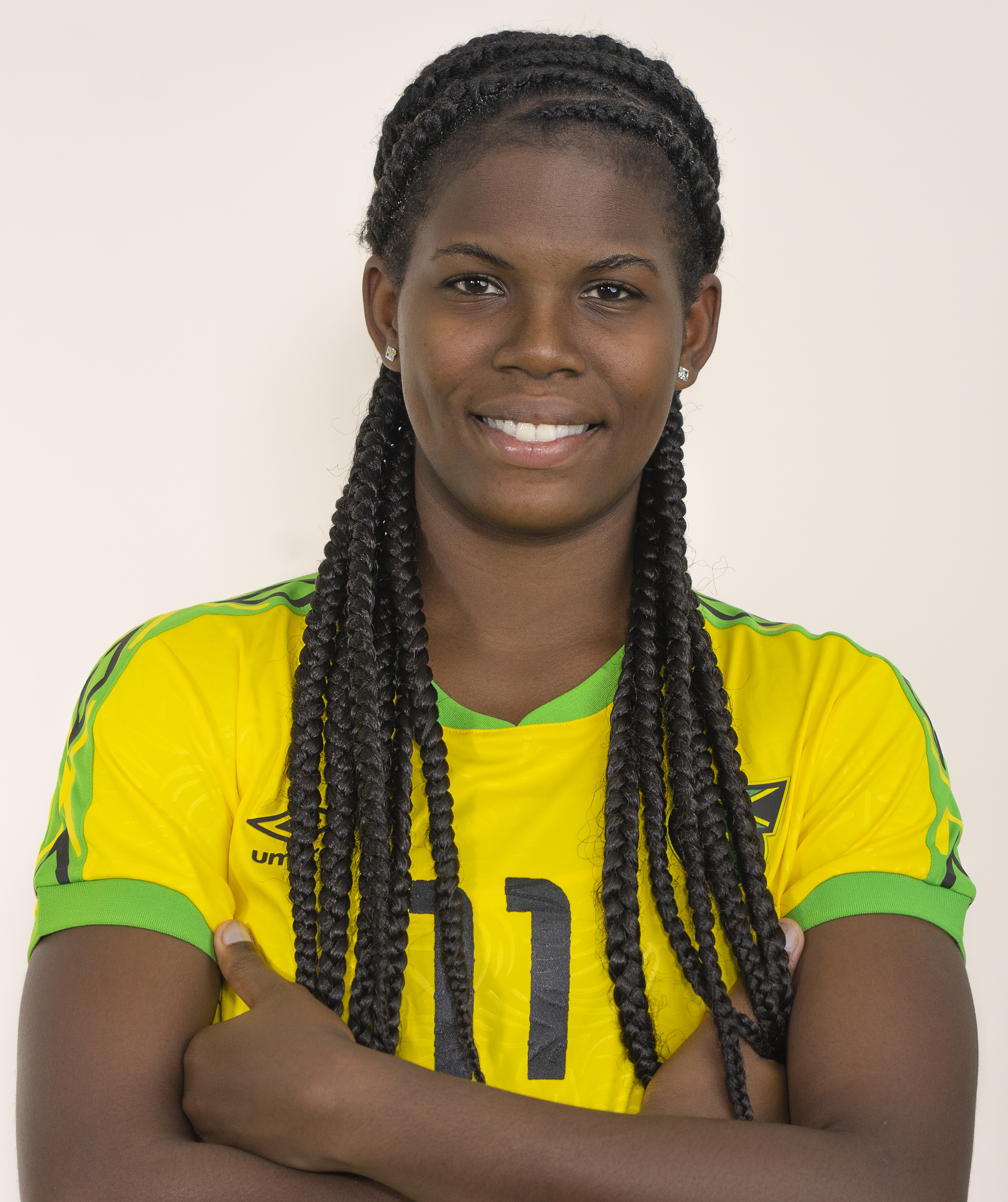
2026 winner Khadija Shaw

The Professional Footballers' Association Women's Players' Player of the Year is an annual award given to the player who is voted to have been the best of the year in English women's football. The award has been presented since the 2012–13 season and the winner is chosen by a vote amongst the members of the players' trade union, the Professional Footballers' Association (PFA). The current holder is Khadija Shaw who won the award on 25 August 2026. The first winner of the award was Arsenal midfielder Kim Little in 2013.

Every spring, each member of the association votes for two players. A shortlist of nominees is published in April and the winner of the award, along with the winners of the PFA's other annual awards, is announced at a gala event in London a few days later.

== Winners ==
The women's award has been presented since 2013 while the men's PFA Players' Player of the Year has been awarded since 1974. The table below also indicates where the winning player also won one or more of the other major "player of the year" awards in English women's football, namely the FWA Women's Footballer of the Year (FWA), PFA Fans' Women's Player of the Year award (FPY), and the PFA Women's Young Player of the Year award.

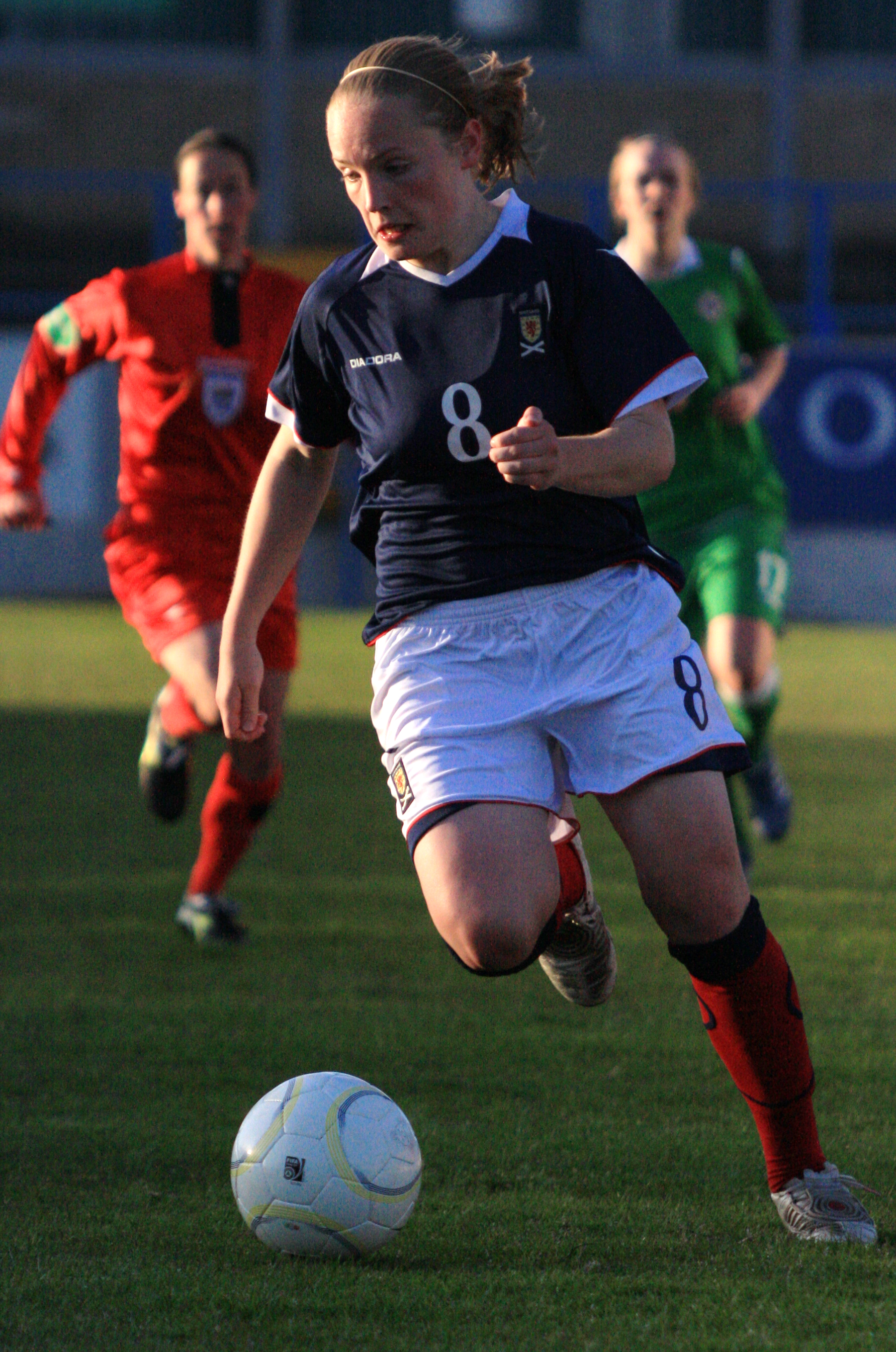
Kim Little was the first player to win the Player of the Year in 2013.

Year		Player	Club	Also won	Notes
2012–13	(Scotland)	Kim Little	Arsenal		
2013–14	(England)	Lucy Bronze	Liverpool		
2014–15	(South Korea)	Ji So-yun	Chelsea		
2015–16	(England)	Izzy Christiansen	Manchester City		
2016–17	(England)	Lucy Bronze	Manchester City		
2017–18	(England)	Fran Kirby	Chelsea	FWA	
2018–19	(Netherlands)	Vivianne Miedema	Arsenal		
2019–20	(England)	Bethany England	Chelsea		
2020–21	(England)	Fran Kirby	Chelsea	FWA	
2021–22	(Australia)	Sam Kerr	Chelsea	FWA	
2022–23	(England)	Rachel Daly	Aston Villa		
2023–24	(Jamaica)	Khadija Shaw	Manchester City	FWA	
2024–25	(Spain)	Mariona Caldentey	Arsenal		
2025–26	(Jamaica)	Khadija Shaw	Manchester City		

== Breakdown of winners ==
=== By country ===
Country	Number of wins	Winning years
England	7	2013–14, 2015–16, 2016–17, 2017–18, 2019–20, 2020–21, 2022–23
Jamaica	2	2023–24, 2025–26
Scotland	1	2012–13
South Korea	1	2014–15
Netherlands	1	2018–19
Australia	1	2021–22
Spain	1	2024–25

=== By club ===
Club	Number of wins	Winning years
Chelsea	5	2014–15, 2017–18, 2019–20, 2020–21, 2021–22
Manchester City	4	2015–16, 2016–17, 2023–24, 2025–26
Arsenal	3	2012–13, 2018–19, 2024–25
Liverpool	1	2013–14
Aston Villa	1	2022–23

== See also ==
- List of sports awards honoring women
