= Lauren Hemp =

English footballer (born 2000)

Lauren Hemp MBE
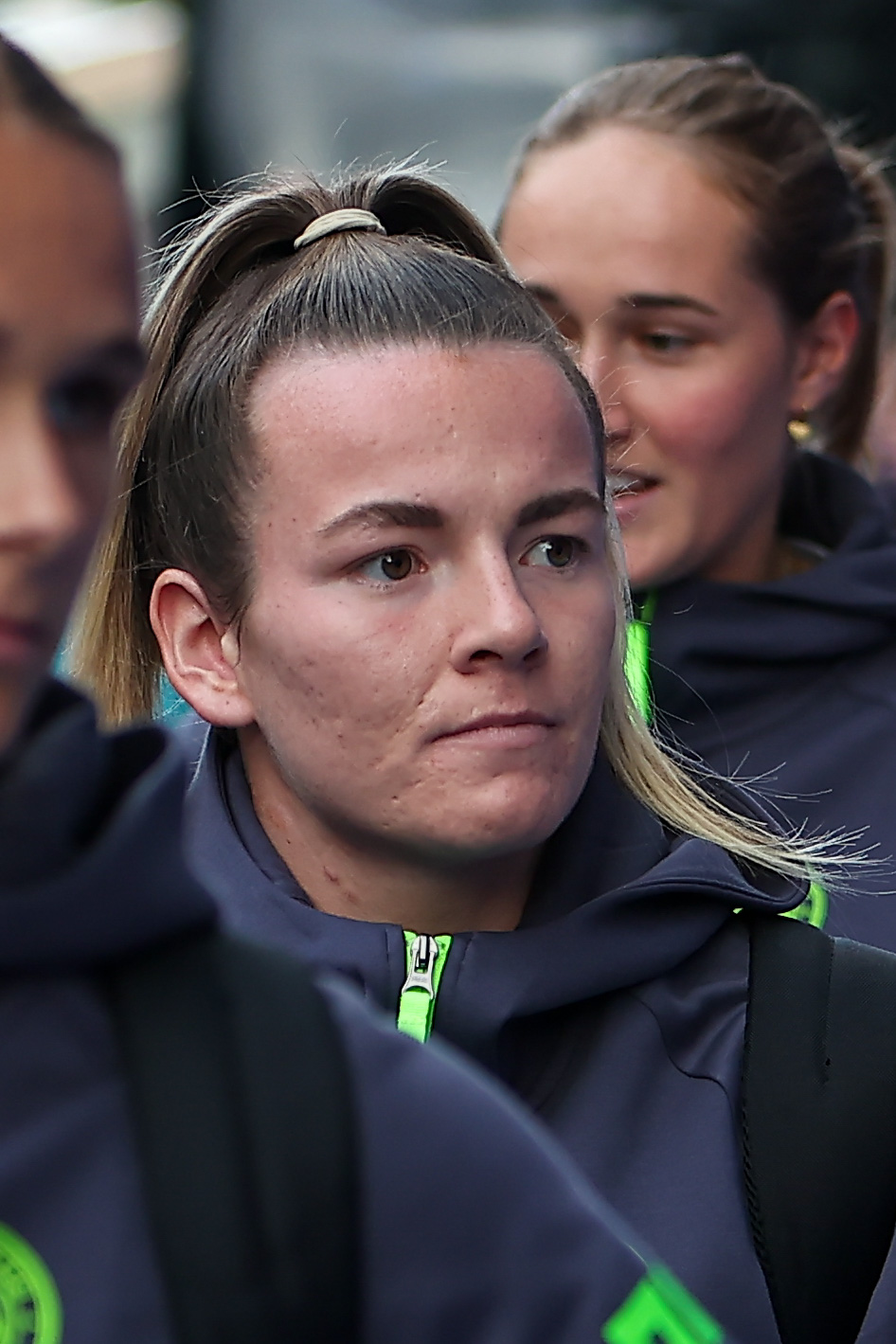
- Hemp in 2025

Personal information
- Full name: Lauren May Hemp
- Date of birth: 7 August 2000 (age 26)
- Place of birth: North Walsham, Norfolk, England
- Height: 5 ft 4 in (1.63 m)
- Position: Winger

Team information
- Current team: Manchester City
- Number: 11

Youth career
- North Walsham Youth FC
- 2008–2015: Norwich City

Senior career*
Years	Team	Apps	(Gls)
2016–2018	Bristol City	24	(9)
2018–	Manchester City	140	(49)

International career^{‡}
2016–2017	England U17	13	(6)
2017–2019	England U19	10	(5)
2018–2019	England U20	9	(5)
2019	England U21	3	(0)
2019–	England	80	(21)
2021–	Great Britain	3	(0)
Medal record
Women's football
Representing England
UEFA Women's Championship
Winner	2022 England
Winner	2025 Switzerland
UEFA–CONMEBOL Finalissima
Winner	2023 England
FIFA Women's World Cup
Runner-up	2023 Australia and New Zealand
FIFA U-20 Women's World Cup
Third place	2018 France
- * Club domestic league appearances and goals as of 22:10, 22 November 2026 (UTC) ‡ National team caps and goals as of 00:05, 14 October 2026 (UTC)

Lauren May Hemp MBE (born 7 August 2000) is an English professional footballer who plays as a winger for Women's Super League club Manchester City and the England national team. With City, she is a WSL, FA Cup, and League Cup winner, and with England; she is a two-time European Championship winner, a Finalissima winner, as well as World Cup runner-up. Since 2017, Hemp was twice named FA England Young Player of the Year and four times named PFA Women's Young Player of the Year.

== Early life and career ==
Hemp grew up in North Walsham, Norfolk, where she attended Millfield Primary School and North Walsham High School. In high school she played for the girls' and boys' teams, and the girls' team won the County Championship. She took an interest in football at a young age and started playing for local club North Walsham Youth FC as one of only two girls on the team.

Her youth career started in 2008 at Norwich City where her sister Amy also played. Her sister had to stop playing after seriously injuring both knees. Hemp joined North Walsham U16 boys while simultaneously playing with Norwich. Hemp played her final game for Norwich in 2015 but continued her association with the club during the 2015–16 season playing for the Norwich City Elite Boys team. The girls' centre closed down, so she joined the boys' team again. When she was 17 she continued to train at the Boys’ Elite Player Development Centre. As part of the "Where Greatness Is Made" campaign, a plaque honouring Hemp was installed at North Walsham Youth.

== Club career ==
=== Bristol City ===
In 2016, after leaving Norwich City, Hemp joined Bristol City. On 10 September 2016, she made her senior debut for the Vixens and scored the team's third goal in a 4–1 win over Watford. On 19 March 2017, she made her first FA Women's Cup appearance, scoring two goals in a 5–0 win over Millwall Lionesses. In the 2017 Spring Series, Hemp made a total of four appearances, scoring one goal. In April 2018, she was named PFA Women's Young Player of the Year. She finished the 2017–18 season with nine goals in 24 appearances in all competitions.

=== Manchester City ===
On 31 May 2018, Hemp signed with Manchester City. She scored her first goal for the club on 13 December 2018 in the 4–0 win over Aston Villa. She won her first trophy with the club in the 2018–19 Continental Cup. She scored a goal in the 2019 FA Cup final, giving her team a 3–0 victory.

In the 2021/22 season she was used in all 22 league games and was the fourth best goalscorer in the league with ten goals. She was named to the WSL Team of the Year for 2021/22 while Manchester City won the Conti Cup.

She signed a two-year extension with the club on 9 January 2022. Two weeks later she scored the club's 700th goal. She missed a month of playing in November 2022 with a thigh injury. She won PFA Women's Young Player of the Year for the fourth time in 2022. In the 2022/23 season, Hemp totaled 28 appearances in all competitions and had 21 goal involvements.

On 9 December 2023, when Manchester City was behind 1–0 to Aston Villa, Hemp scored a brace to give her team a 2–1 victory. She scored in the 2–1 win against Everton on 2 March 2024 to put Manchester City at the top of the table.

On 26 April 2024, Manchester City announced Hemp’s three-year contract extension until 2027. In September 2024, Hemp was nominated for the Ballon d'Or alongside fellow England internationals Lauren James and Lucy Bronze.

Hemp scored her 50th WSL goal in a 2–0 win against West Ham United on 6 October 2024, becoming the youngest player to reach that milestone. That same month, she was voted both WSL Player of the Month and the PFA Fans' Player of the Month. On 8 November 2024, she provided three assists during City's 4–0 home victory against Tottenham Hotspur. Hemp underwent surgery on a knee injury in November 2024, missing five months of the season as a result. She made her return during Manchester City's 1–0 win over Leicester City on 27 April 2025.

On 6 September 2026, during the opening match of the 2026–27 season against Birmingham City, Hemp made her 200th appearance for Manchester City. She is the fourth player to reach this milestone, following Steph Houghton, Keira Walsh, and Demi Stokes. On 13 September 2026, she recorded an assist for Bunny Shaw in a match against Aston Villa, bringing her career totals to 52 goals and 48 assists in the WSL. This made her the seventh player in WSL history to reach a combined 100 goals and assists, following Vivianne Miedema, Beth Mead, Beth England, Fran Kirby, Nikita Parris, and Bunny Shaw.

On 4 October 2026, Hemp scored twice in Manchester City's 4–2 victory over Arsenal. Following an impressive month in which she recorded two goals and three assists in WSL, she was once again named both the WSL Player of the Month and the PFA Fans' Player of the Month.

== International career ==
In February 2015, Hemp received her first call-up to the under-15 squad. In May 2017, she captained England at the UEFA Under-17 Championship, scoring a goal in a 5–0 win over the Republic of Ireland. In September 2017, she was named Vauxhall England Young Player of the Year. In August 2018, she helped England under-20 finish third at the 2018 FIFA U-20 World Cup.

Hemp made her senior England debut on 8 October 2019, coming on as an 86th-minute substitute for Beth Mead in a 1–0 friendly win against Portugal. On 27 May 2021, it was announced that she had been selected in the Great Britain Olympic football team for the 2020 Olympics.

In January 2020, Hemp was named by UEFA as one of the ten most promising young players in Europe. On 30 November 2021, she scored her first four goals for England, in a national record 20–0 win over Latvia. In June Hemp was included in the England squad which won the Euro 2022. She played in all six games. During the final it was Hemp's corner that was pressed home by teammate Chloe Kelly to create the winning second goal in front of over 87,000 spectators.

Although usually a winger, Hemp was played in the number 9 (striker) role when England played the USA in a friendly at Wembley on 7 October 2022. The experiment paid off for manager Sarina Wiegman with Hemp scoring within the first 10 minutes in a 2–1 England victory.

During the 2023 Finalissima victory for England, Hemp was knocked on the nose and wore a protective face mask in subsequent games.

On 31 May 2023, Hemp was named to the squad for the 2023 World Cup in July 2023. Hemp scored a goal in England's 6–1 defeat of China. In the quarter-final tie against Colombia, Hemp scored England's equaliser in first half added time as England won 2–1. In the semi-final, Hemp scored the second and assisted for the third as England defeated Australia 3–1 to reach the team's first ever World Cup final.

In the 2023–24 Nations League, Hemp scored in the 1–0 victory over Belgium, and she scored the tying goal in England's 3–2 victory over Netherlands.

Assisting both goals in the 2–1 victory against France on 4 June 2024, Hemp helped her team qualify for UEFA Euro 2025. On 6 June 2025, she was named in England's squad for the tournament itself. Hemp started in the tournament's final on 27 July 2025, helping England to a 1–1 (3–1 on penalties) win over Spain while winning praise for her individual performance.

Playing in England's 2027 World Cup qualifying campaign, Hemp provided the assist to Alessia Russo in a 1–0 win over Iceland on 18 April 2026, in what was the 500th fixture played in the Lionesses' history.

== Personal life ==
As of 2023, Hemp has been in a relationship with fellow footballer, Sheffield United midfielder, Ashley Hodson. Hemp enjoys building Lego in her spare time. In March 2023, a 7-metre (23 ft) high mural of Hemp was unveiled on the side of a cafe in her hometown of North Walsham. It was painted by a street artist to honour her achievements. Hemp is also an avid cricket fan, having played for her county as a teenager. Hemp was appointed Member of the Order of the British Empire (MBE) in the 2024 New Year Honours for services to association football.

== Career statistics ==
=== Club ===
As of match played 22 November 2026.

Appearances and goals by club, season and competition
Club	Season	League			National cup (Note: Includes the Women's FA Cup)		League cup (Note: Includes the WSL Cup/Women's League Cup)		Europe (Note: Includes the UEFA Women's Champions League)		Other (Note: Includes the Community Shield)		Total	
Club	Season	Division	Apps	Goals	Apps	Goals	Apps	Goals	Apps	Goals	Apps	Goals	Apps	Goals
Bristol City	2016	Women's Super League 2	2	1	0	0	0	0	—		—		2	1
Bristol City	2017	Women's Super League	4	1	1	2	—		—		—		5	3
Bristol City	2017–18	Women's Super League	18	7	1	0	5	2	—		—		24	9
Bristol City	Total		24	9	2	2	5	2	0	0	0	0	31	13
Manchester City	2018–19	Women's Super League	10	2	4	2	5	3	1	0	—		20	7
Manchester City	2019–20	Women's Super League	14	5	0	0	3	1	2	0	—		19	6
Manchester City	2020–21	Women's Super League	15	6	2	1	1	1	4	2	1	0	23	10
Manchester City	2021–22	Women's Super League	22	10	5	7	6	4	2	0	—		35	21
Manchester City	2022–23	Women's Super League	20	7	2	0	4	2	2	1	—		28	10
Manchester City	2023–24	Women's Super League	21	11	3	0	5	1	—		—		29	12
Manchester City	2024–25	Women's Super League	10	2	0	0	0	0	3	0	—		13	2
Manchester City	2025–26	Women's Super League	18	1	5	3	3	2	—		—		26	6
Manchester City	2026–27	Women's Super League	10	5	0	0	—		5	1	—		15	6
Manchester City	Total		140	49	21	13	27	14	19	4	1	0	208	80
Career total			164	58	23	15	32	16	19	4	1	0	239	93

=== International ===
As of match played 13 October 2026

Appearances and goals by national team and year
National team	Year	Apps	Goals
England	2019	3	0
England	2020	2	0
England	2021	9	4
England	2022	18	6
England	2023	19	6
England	2024	10	2
England	2025	11	2
England	2026	8	1
Total		80	21

National team	Year	Apps	Goals
Great Britain	2021	3	0
Total		3	0

Scores and results list England's goal tally first, score column indicates score after each Hemp goal.

List of international goals scored by Lauren Hemp
No.	Date	Venue	Opponent	Score	Result	Competition
1	30 November 2021	Keepmoat Stadium, Doncaster, England	Latvia	5–0	20–0	2023 FIFA Women's World Cup qualification
2	30 November 2021	Keepmoat Stadium, Doncaster, England	Latvia	8–0	20–0	2023 FIFA Women's World Cup qualification
3	30 November 2021	Keepmoat Stadium, Doncaster, England	Latvia	15–0	20–0	2023 FIFA Women's World Cup qualification
4	30 November 2021	Keepmoat Stadium, Doncaster, England	Latvia	20–0	20–0	2023 FIFA Women's World Cup qualification
5	12 April 2022	Windsor Park, Belfast, Northern Ireland	Northern Ireland	1–0	5–0	2023 FIFA Women's World Cup qualification
6	12 April 2022	Windsor Park, Belfast, Northern Ireland	Northern Ireland	3–0	5–0	2023 FIFA Women's World Cup qualification
7	24 June 2022	Elland Road, Leeds, England	Netherlands	4–1	5–1	Friendly
8	11 July 2022	Falmer Stadium, Brighton and Hove, England	Norway	2–0	8–0	UEFA Women's Euro 2022
9	6 September 2022	Bet365 Stadium, Stoke-on-Trent, England	Luxembourg	9–0	10–0	2023 FIFA Women's World Cup qualification
10	7 October 2022	Wembley Stadium, London, England	United States	1–0	2–1	Friendly
11	1 August 2023	Hindmarsh Stadium, Adelaide, Australia	China	2–0	6–1	2023 FIFA Women's World Cup
12	12 August 2023	Stadium Australia, Sydney, Australia	Colombia	1–1	2–1	2023 FIFA Women's World Cup
13	16 August 2023	Stadium Australia, Sydney, Australia	Australia	2–1	3–1	2023 FIFA Women's World Cup
14	22 September 2023	Stadium of Light, Sunderland, England	Scotland	2–0	2–1	2023–24 UEFA Women's Nations League A
15	27 October 2023	King Power Stadium, Leicester, England	Belgium	1–0	1–0	2023–24 UEFA Women's Nations League A
16	1 December 2023	Wembley Stadium, London, England	Netherlands	2–2	3–2	2023–24 UEFA Women's Nations League A
17	27 February 2024	Estadio Nuevo Mirador, Algeciras, Spain	Italy	2–0	5–1	Friendly
18	27 February 2024	Estadio Nuevo Mirador, Algeciras, Spain	Italy	3–0	5–1	Friendly
19	13 July 2025	Kybunpark, St. Gallen, Switzerland	Wales	3–0	6–1	UEFA Women's Euro 2025
20	29 November 2025	Wembley Stadium, London, England	China	3–0	8–0	Friendly
21	14 April 2026	Wembley Stadium, London, England	Spain	1–0	1–0	2027 FIFA Women's World Cup qualification

== Honours ==
Manchester City

- Women's Super League: 2025–26
- Women's FA Cup: 2018–19, 2025–26
- Women's League Cup: 2021–22

England U20

- FIFA U-20 Women's World Cup third place: 2018

England

- FIFA Women's World Cup runner-up: 2023
- UEFA Women's Championship: 2022, 2025
- Women's Finalissima: 2023
- Arnold Clark Cup: 2022, 2023

Individual

- UEFA Women's Under-17 Championship Team of the Tournament: 2017
- PFA Women's Young Player of the Year: 2017–18, 2019–20, 2020–21, 2021–22,
- PFA WSL Team of the Year: 2020–21, 2021–22, 2023–24
- Vauxhall England Young Player of the Year: 2017
- WSL Player of the Month: October 2024, October 2026

State and civic honours

- Freedom of the Town of North Walsham: 5 August 2022.
- Freedom of the City of London (announced 1 August 2022)
- Member of the Order of the British Empire: (MBE) 2024 New Year Honours
