= FIFPRO World 11 =

Association football team of the year award

- Presented by: FIFPRO
- First award: 2005; 21 years ago

Highlights
- Most awards: Men's: (Argentina) Lionel Messi (18 selections); Women's: (England) Lucy Bronze (9 selections)
- Website: fifpro.org

The FIFPRO World 11 are the best association football men's and women's teams of the year. FIFPRO invites all professional men's and women's footballers to compose the teams. Initially known as the FIFPRO World 11, the award began in 2005 and celebrated the best football players as voted by their peers. In 2009, FIFPRO partnered with FIFA, rebranding it as the 'FIFA FIFPRO World 11' while retaining its original format. From the 2024 edition onward, FIFPRO independently manages the award, reverting to its original name, the FIFPRO World 11.

Every year, FIFPRO and approximately 70 affiliated players unions distribute unique links that give players from all professional football clubs on the planet access to the digital voting platform. An initial 26-person squad then reveals the nominees. The goalkeeper, as well as the three defenders, three midfielders and three forwards who receive the most votes are then selected for the World 11. The remaining spot is assigned to the outfield player with the next highest number of votes who is not selected already. Lionel Messi has the most ever appearances in the FIFPRO World 11 with 18 overall, followed by Cristiano Ronaldo with 15.

In 2014, FIFPRO launched a women's football committee. In February 2016, the FIFPRO Women's World 11 was launched. Players of 33 different nationalities in over 20 countries participated in voting for one goalkeeper, four defenders, three midfielders and three forwards.

== FIFPRO Men's World 11 ==
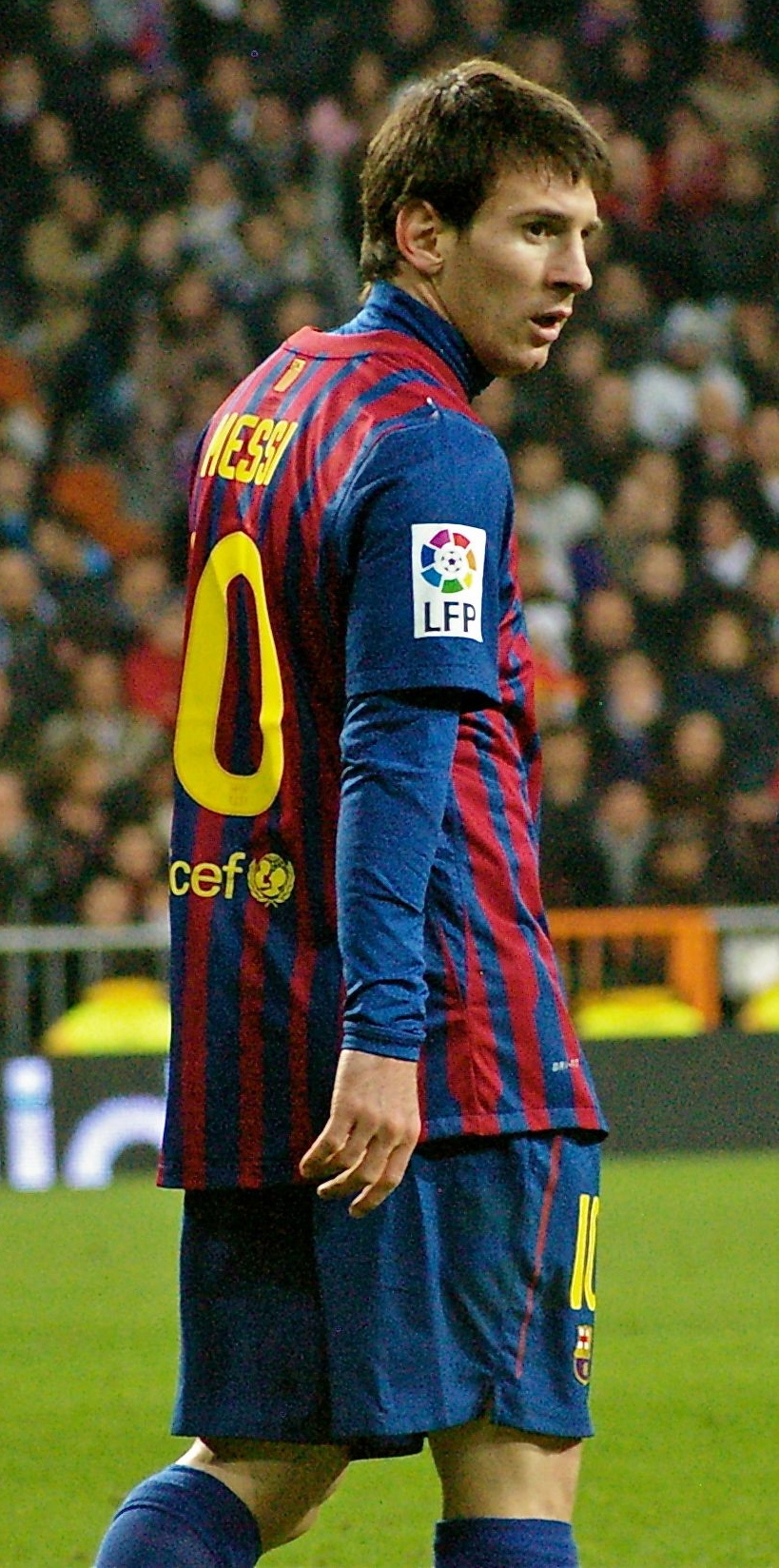
Lionel Messi has made 18 appearances in the FIFPRO World 11, the most all-time.

=== Winners ===
Players marked bold won the FIFA World Player of the Year (2005–2009), the FIFA Ballon d'Or (2010–2015) or The Best FIFA Men's Player (2016–present) in that respective year.

Year	Goalkeeper (club)	Defenders (clubs)	Midfielders (clubs)	Forwards (clubs)
2005	(Brazil) Dida (Milan)	(Italy) Paolo Maldini (Milan) (England) John Terry (Chelsea) (Italy) Alessandro Nesta (Milan) (Brazil) Cafu (Milan)	(France) Zinedine Zidane (Real Madrid) (France) Claude Makélélé (Chelsea) (England) Frank Lampard (Chelsea)	**(Brazil) Ronaldinho (Barcelona)** (Cameroon) Samuel Eto'o (Barcelona) (Ukraine) Andriy Shevchenko (Milan)
2006	(Italy) Gianluigi Buffon (Juventus)	(Italy) Gianluca Zambrotta (Juventus/Barcelona) (England) John Terry (Chelsea) (Italy) **Fabio Cannavaro (Juventus/Real Madrid)** (France) Lilian Thuram (Juventus/Barcelona)	(France) Zinedine Zidane (Real Madrid) (Italy) Andrea Pirlo (Milan) (Brazil) Kaká (Milan)	(Brazil) Ronaldinho (Barcelona) (Cameroon) Samuel Eto'o (Barcelona) (France) Thierry Henry (Arsenal)
2007	(Italy) Gianluigi Buffon (Juventus)	(Italy) Alessandro Nesta (Milan) (England) John Terry (Chelsea) (Italy) Fabio Cannavaro (Real Madrid) (Spain) Carles Puyol (Barcelona)	(Portugal) Cristiano Ronaldo (Manchester United) (England) Steven Gerrard (Liverpool) (Brazil) **Kaká (Milan)**	(Brazil) Ronaldinho (Barcelona) (Ivory Coast) Didier Drogba (Chelsea) (Argentina) Lionel Messi (Barcelona)
2008	(Spain) Iker Casillas (Real Madrid)	(England) Rio Ferdinand (Manchester United) (England) John Terry (Chelsea) (Spain) Carles Puyol (Barcelona) (Spain) Sergio Ramos (Real Madrid)	(Brazil) Kaká (Milan) (Spain) Xavi (Barcelona) (England) Steven Gerrard (Liverpool)	(Portugal) **Cristiano Ronaldo (Manchester United)** (Spain) Fernando Torres (Liverpool) (Argentina) Lionel Messi (Barcelona)
2009	(Spain) Iker Casillas (Real Madrid)	(France) Patrice Evra (Manchester United) (England) John Terry (Chelsea) (Serbia) Nemanja Vidić (Manchester United) (Brazil) Dani Alves (Barcelona)	(Spain) Andrés Iniesta (Barcelona) (Spain) Xavi (Barcelona) (England) Steven Gerrard (Liverpool)	(Portugal) Cristiano Ronaldo (Manchester United/Real Madrid) (Spain) Fernando Torres (Liverpool) **(Argentina) Lionel Messi (Barcelona)**
2010	(Spain) Iker Casillas (Real Madrid)	(Spain) Carles Puyol (Barcelona) (Spain) Gerard Piqué (Barcelona) (Brazil) Lúcio (Inter Milan) (Brazil) Maicon (Inter Milan)	(Spain) Andrés Iniesta (Barcelona) (Spain) Xavi (Barcelona) (Netherlands) Wesley Sneijder (Inter Milan)	(Portugal) Cristiano Ronaldo (Real Madrid) (Spain) David Villa (Valencia/Barcelona) (Argentina) **Lionel Messi (Barcelona)**
2011	(Spain) Iker Casillas (Real Madrid)	(Spain) Sergio Ramos (Real Madrid) (Spain) Gerard Piqué (Barcelona) (Serbia) Nemanja Vidić (Manchester United) (Brazil) Dani Alves (Barcelona)	(Spain) Andrés Iniesta (Barcelona) (Spain) Xavi (Barcelona) (Spain) Xabi Alonso (Real Madrid)	(Portugal) Cristiano Ronaldo (Real Madrid) (England) Wayne Rooney (Manchester United) (Argentina) **Lionel Messi (Barcelona)**
2012	(Spain) Iker Casillas (Real Madrid)	(Brazil) Marcelo (Real Madrid) (Spain) Sergio Ramos (Real Madrid) (Spain) Gerard Piqué (Barcelona) (Brazil) Dani Alves (Barcelona)	(Spain) Andrés Iniesta (Barcelona) (Spain) Xavi (Barcelona) (Spain) Xabi Alonso (Real Madrid)	(Portugal) Cristiano Ronaldo (Real Madrid) (Colombia) Radamel Falcao (Atlético Madrid) (Argentina) **Lionel Messi (Barcelona)**
2013	(Germany) Manuel Neuer (Bayern Munich)	(Germany) Philipp Lahm (Bayern Munich) (Spain) Sergio Ramos (Real Madrid) (Brazil) Thiago Silva (Paris Saint-Germain) (Brazil) Dani Alves (Barcelona)	(Spain) Andrés Iniesta (Barcelona) (Spain) Xavi (Barcelona) (France) Franck Ribéry (Bayern Munich)	(Portugal) **Cristiano Ronaldo (Real Madrid)** (Sweden) Zlatan Ibrahimović (Paris Saint-Germain) (Argentina) Lionel Messi (Barcelona)
2014	(Germany) Manuel Neuer (Bayern Munich)	(Germany) Philipp Lahm (Bayern Munich) (Spain) Sergio Ramos (Real Madrid) (Brazil) Thiago Silva (Paris Saint-Germain) (Brazil) David Luiz (Chelsea/Paris Saint-Germain)	(Spain) Andrés Iniesta (Barcelona) (Germany) Toni Kroos (Bayern Munich/Real Madrid) (Argentina) Ángel Di María (Real Madrid/Manchester United)	(Portugal) **Cristiano Ronaldo (Real Madrid)** (Netherlands) Arjen Robben (Bayern Munich) (Argentina) Lionel Messi (Barcelona)
2015	(Germany) Manuel Neuer (Bayern Munich)	(Brazil) Marcelo (Real Madrid) (Spain) Sergio Ramos (Real Madrid) (Brazil) Thiago Silva (Paris Saint-Germain) (Brazil) Dani Alves (Barcelona)	(Spain) Andrés Iniesta (Barcelona) (France) Paul Pogba (Juventus) (Croatia) Luka Modrić (Real Madrid)	(Brazil) Neymar (Barcelona) (Portugal) Cristiano Ronaldo (Real Madrid) (Argentina) **Lionel Messi (Barcelona)**
2016	(Germany) Manuel Neuer (Bayern Munich)	(Brazil) Marcelo (Real Madrid) (Spain) Sergio Ramos (Real Madrid) (Spain) Gerard Piqué (Barcelona) (Brazil) Dani Alves (Barcelona/Juventus)	(Spain) Andrés Iniesta (Barcelona) (Germany) Toni Kroos (Real Madrid) (Croatia) Luka Modrić (Real Madrid)	(Portugal) **Cristiano Ronaldo (Real Madrid)** (Uruguay) Luis Suárez (Barcelona) (Argentina) Lionel Messi (Barcelona)
2017	(Italy) Gianluigi Buffon (Juventus)	(Brazil) Marcelo (Real Madrid) (Spain) Sergio Ramos (Real Madrid) (Italy) Leonardo Bonucci (Juventus/Milan) (Brazil) Dani Alves (Juventus/Paris Saint-Germain)	(Spain) Andrés Iniesta (Barcelona) (Germany) Toni Kroos (Real Madrid) (Croatia) Luka Modrić (Real Madrid)	(Brazil) Neymar (Barcelona/Paris Saint-Germain) (Portugal) **Cristiano Ronaldo (Real Madrid)** (Argentina) Lionel Messi (Barcelona)
2018	(Spain) David de Gea (Manchester United)	(Brazil) Marcelo (Real Madrid) (Spain) Sergio Ramos (Real Madrid) (France) Raphaël Varane (Real Madrid) (Brazil) Dani Alves (Paris Saint-Germain)	(Belgium) Eden Hazard (Chelsea) (France) N'Golo Kanté (Chelsea) (Croatia) **Luka Modrić (Real Madrid)**	(France) Kylian Mbappé (Paris Saint-Germain) (Portugal) Cristiano Ronaldo (Real Madrid/Juventus) (Argentina) Lionel Messi (Barcelona)
2019	(Brazil) Alisson (Liverpool)	(Brazil) Marcelo (Real Madrid) (Spain) Sergio Ramos (Real Madrid) (Netherlands) Virgil van Dijk (Liverpool) (Netherlands) Matthijs de Ligt (Ajax/Juventus)	(Belgium) Eden Hazard (Chelsea/Real Madrid) (Netherlands) Frenkie de Jong (Ajax/Barcelona) (Croatia) Luka Modrić (Real Madrid)	(Portugal) Cristiano Ronaldo (Juventus) (France) Kylian Mbappé (Paris Saint-Germain) (Argentina) **Lionel Messi (Barcelona)**
2020	(Brazil) Alisson (Liverpool)	(Canada) Alphonso Davies (Bayern Munich) (Spain) Sergio Ramos (Real Madrid) (Netherlands) Virgil van Dijk (Liverpool) (England) Trent Alexander-Arnold (Liverpool)	(Spain) Thiago (Bayern Munich/Liverpool) (Belgium) Kevin De Bruyne (Manchester City) (Germany) Joshua Kimmich (Bayern Munich)	(Portugal) Cristiano Ronaldo (Juventus) (Poland) **Robert Lewandowski (Bayern Munich)** (Argentina) Lionel Messi (Barcelona)
2021	(Italy) Gianluigi Donnarumma (Milan/Paris Saint-Germain)	(Austria) David Alaba (Bayern Munich/Real Madrid) (Italy) Leonardo Bonucci (Juventus) (Portugal) Rúben Dias (Manchester City)	(Italy) Jorginho (Chelsea) (France) N'Golo Kanté (Chelsea) (Belgium) Kevin De Bruyne (Manchester City)	(Portugal) Cristiano Ronaldo (Juventus/Manchester United) (Norway) Erling Haaland (Borussia Dortmund) (Poland) **Robert Lewandowski (Bayern Munich)** (Argentina) Lionel Messi (Barcelona/Paris Saint-Germain)
2022	(Belgium) Thibaut Courtois (Real Madrid)	(Portugal) João Cancelo (Manchester City/Bayern Munich) (Netherlands) Virgil van Dijk (Liverpool) (Morocco) Achraf Hakimi (Paris Saint-Germain)	(Brazil) Casemiro (Real Madrid/Manchester United) (Belgium) Kevin De Bruyne (Manchester City) (Croatia) Luka Modrić (Real Madrid)	(France) Karim Benzema (Real Madrid) (Norway) Erling Haaland (Borussia Dortmund/Manchester City) (France) Kylian Mbappé (Paris Saint-Germain) (Argentina) **Lionel Messi (Paris Saint-Germain**)
2023	(Belgium) Thibaut Courtois (Real Madrid)	(England) John Stones (Manchester City) (Portugal) Rúben Dias (Manchester City) (England) Kyle Walker (Manchester City)	(England) Jude Bellingham (Borussia Dortmund/Real Madrid) (Belgium) Kevin De Bruyne (Manchester City) (Portugal) Bernardo Silva (Manchester City)	(Brazil) Vinícius Júnior (Real Madrid) (France) Kylian Mbappé (Paris Saint-Germain) (Norway) Erling Haaland (Manchester City) (Argentina) **Lionel Messi (Paris Saint-Germain/Inter Miami)**
2024	(Brazil) Ederson (Manchester City)	(Netherlands) Virgil van Dijk (Liverpool) (Germany) Antonio Rüdiger (Real Madrid) (Spain) Dani Carvajal (Real Madrid)	(England) Jude Bellingham (Real Madrid) (Germany) Toni Kroos (Real Madrid) (Spain) Rodri (Manchester City) (Belgium) Kevin De Bruyne (Manchester City)	(Brazil) **Vinícius Júnior (Real Madrid)** (Norway) Erling Haaland (Manchester City) (France) Kylian Mbappé (Paris Saint-Germain/Real Madrid)
2025	(Italy) Gianluigi Donnarumma (Paris Saint-Germain/Manchester City)	(Portugal) Nuno Mendes (Paris Saint-Germain) (Netherlands) Virgil van Dijk (Liverpool) (Morocco) Achraf Hakimi (Paris Saint-Germain)	(Portugal) Vitinha (Paris Saint-Germain) (Spain) Pedri (Barcelona) (England) Jude Bellingham (Real Madrid) (England) Cole Palmer (Chelsea)	(France) **Ousmane Dembélé (Paris Saint-Germain)** (France) Kylian Mbappé (Real Madrid) (Spain) Lamine Yamal (Barcelona)
2026	(Spain) David Raya (Arsenal)	(Portugal) Nuno Mendes (Paris Saint-Germain) (Spain) Pau Cubarsí (Barcelona) (Morocco) Achraf Hakimi (Paris Saint-Germain)	(Portugal) Vitinha (Paris Saint-Germain) (Spain) Rodri (Manchester City/Barcelona) (England) Jude Bellingham (Real Madrid)	(Argentina) Lionel Messi (Inter Miami) (France) Kylian Mbappé (Real Madrid) (Spain) Lamine Yamal (Barcelona) (Norway) Erling Haaland (Manchester City)

=== Appearances by player ===
Players in bold were part of the most recent World 11.

Rank	Player	Apps	Years	Club(s)
1	(Argentina) **Lionel Messi**	18	2007, 2008, **2009**, **2010**, **2011**, **2012**, 2013, 2014, **2015**, 2016, 2017, 2018, **2019**, 2020; 2021, **2022**, **2023**, 2026	Barcelona; Paris Saint-Germain; Inter Miami
2	(Portugal) Cristiano Ronaldo	15	2007, **2008**, 2009, 2010, 2011, 2012, **2013**, **2014**, 2015, **2016**, **2017**, 2018, 2019, 2020; 2021	Manchester United; Real Madrid; Juventus
3	(Spain) Sergio Ramos	11	2008, 2011, 2012, 2013, 2014, 2015, 2016, 2017, 2018, 2019, 2020	Real Madrid
4	(Spain) Andrés Iniesta	9	2009, 2010, 2011, 2012, 2013, 2014, 2015, 2016, 2017	Barcelona
5	(Brazil) Dani Alves	8	2009, 2011, 2012, 2013, 2015, 2016, 2017, 2018	Barcelona; Juventus; Paris Saint-Germain
6	(France) **Kylian Mbappé**	7	2018, 2019, 2022, 2023, 2024, 2025, 2026	Paris Saint-Germain; Real Madrid
7	(Brazil) Marcelo	6	2012, 2015, 2016, 2017, 2018, 2019	Real Madrid
7	(Croatia) Luka Modrić	6	2015, 2016, 2017, **2018**, 2019, 2022	Real Madrid
7	(Spain) Xavi	6	2008, 2009, 2010, 2011, 2012, 2013	Barcelona
10	(Spain) Iker Casillas	5	2008, 2009, 2010, 2011, 2012	Real Madrid
10	(Belgium) Kevin De Bruyne	5	2020, 2021, 2022, 2023, 2024	Manchester City
10	(England) John Terry	5	2005, 2006, 2007, 2008, 2009	Chelsea
10	(Netherlands) Virgil van Dijk	5	2019, 2020, 2022, 2024, 2025	Liverpool
10	(Norway) **Erling Haaland**	5	2021, 2022, 2023, 2024, 2026	Borussia Dortmund; Manchester City
15	(Germany) Toni Kroos	4	2014, 2016, 2017, 2024	Bayern Munich; Real Madrid
15	(Germany) Manuel Neuer	4	2013, 2014, 2015, 2016	Bayern Munich
15	(Spain) Gerard Piqué	4	2010, 2011, 2012, 2016	Barcelona
15	(England) **Jude Bellingham**	4	2023, 2024, 2025, 2026	Borussia Dortmund; Real Madrid
19	(Italy) Gianluigi Buffon	3	2006, 2007, 2017	Juventus
19	(England) Steven Gerrard	3	2007, 2008, 2009	Liverpool
19	(Brazil) Kaká	3	2006, **2007**, 2008	Milan
19	(Spain) Carles Puyol	3	2007, 2008, 2010	Barcelona
19	(Brazil) Ronaldinho	3	**2005**, 2006, 2007	Barcelona
19	(Brazil) Thiago Silva	3	2013, 2014, 2015	Paris Saint-Germain
19	(Morocco) **Achraf Hakimi**	3	2022, 2025, 2026	Paris Saint-Germain

=== Appearances by club ===
Players in italics have made appearances with multiple clubs, and appearances are separated accordingly.

Rank	Club	Apps	Player(s) (apps)
1	(Spain) Real Madrid	67	Ramos (11), C. Ronaldo (10), Marcelo (6), Modrić (6), Casillas (5), Kroos (4), Bellingham (4), Mbappé (3), Alonso (2), Cannavaro (2), Courtois (2), Vinícius (2), Zidane (2), Alaba (1), Benzema (1), Carvajal (1), Casemiro (1), Di María (1), Hazard (1), Rüdiger (1), Varane (1)
2	(Spain) Barcelona	60	Messi (15), Iniesta (9), Dani Alves (6), Xavi (6), Piqué (4), Puyol (3), Ronaldinho (3), Eto'o (2), Neymar (2), Yamal (2), De Jong (1), Pedri (1), Suárez (1), Thuram (1), Villa (1), Zambrotta (1), Rodri (1), Cubarsí (1)
3	(France) Paris Saint-Germain	26	Mbappé (5), Messi (3), Thiago Silva (3), Hakimi (3), Dani Alves (2), Donnarumma (2), Mendes (2), Vitinha (2), Dembélé (1), Ibrahimović (1), David Luiz (1), Neymar (1)
4	(England) Manchester City	19	De Bruyne (5), Haaland (4), Dias (2), Rodri (2), Cancelo (1), Donnarumma (1), Ederson (1), Silva (1), Stones (1), Walker (1)
5	(Germany) Bayern Munich	16	Neuer (4), Lahm (2), Lewandowski (2), Alaba (1), Cancelo (1), Davies (1), Kimmich (1), Kroos (1), Ribéry (1), Robben (1), Thiago (1)
5	(Italy) Juventus	16	C. Ronaldo (4), Buffon (3), Dani Alves (2), Bonucci (2), Cannavaro (1), De Ligt (1), Pogba (1), Thuram (1), Zambrotta (1)
7	(England) Chelsea	15	Terry (5), Hazard (2), Kanté (2), Drogba (1), Jorginho (1), Lampard (1), David Luiz (1), Makélélé (1), Palmer (1)
8	(England) Liverpool	14	Van Dijk (5), Gerrard (3), Alisson (2), Torres (2), Alexander-Arnold (1), Thiago (1)
9	(England) Manchester United	12	C. Ronaldo (4), Vidić (2), Casemiro (1), De Gea (1), Di María (1), Evra (1), Ferdinand (1), Rooney (1)
9	(Italy) Milan	12	Kaká (3), Nesta (2), Bonucci (1), Cafu (1), Dida (1), Donnarumma (1), Maldini (1), Pirlo (1), Shevchenko (1)
11	(Germany) Borussia Dortmund	3	Haaland (2), Bellingham (1)
11	(Italy) Inter Milan	3	Lúcio (1), Maicon (1), Sneijder (1)
13	(Netherlands) Ajax	2	De Jong (1), De Ligt (1)
13	(England) Arsenal	2	Henry (1), Raya (1)
13	(United States) Inter Miami	2	Messi (2)
16	(Spain) Atlético Madrid	1	Falcao (1)
16	(Spain) Valencia	1	Villa (1)

=== Appearances by nationality ===
Rank	Nation	Apps	Player(s) (apps)
1	Spain	53	Ramos (11), Iniesta (9), Xavi (6), Casillas (5), Piqué (4), Puyol (3), Alonso (2), Torres (2), Rodri (2), Yamal (2), Carvajal (1), De Gea (1), Pedri (1), Thiago (1), Villa (1), Raya (1), Cubarsí (1)
2	Brazil	36	Dani Alves (8), Marcelo (6), Kaká (3), Ronaldinho (3), Thiago Silva (3), Alisson (2), Neymar (2), Vinícius (2), Cafu (1), Casemiro (1), Dida (1), Ederson (1), Lúcio (1), David Luiz (1), Maicon (1)
3	Portugal	23	C. Ronaldo (15), Dias (2), Mendes (2), Vitinha (2), Cancelo (1), Silva (1)
4	France	20	Mbappé (7), Kanté (2), Zidane (2), Benzema (1), Dembélé (1), Evra (1), Henry (1), Makélélé (1), Pogba (1), Ribéry (1), Thuram (1), Varane (1)
5	Argentina	19	Messi (18), Di María (1)
5	England	19	Terry (5), Bellingham (4), Gerrard (3), Alexander-Arnold (1), Ferdinand (1), Lampard (1), Palmer (1), Rooney (1), Stones (1), Walker (1)
7	Italy	15	Buffon (3), Bonucci (2), Cannavaro (2), Nesta (2), Donnarumma (2), Jorginho (1), Maldini (1), Pirlo (1), Zambrotta (1)
8	Germany	12	Kroos (4), Neuer (4), Lahm (2), Kimmich (1), Rüdiger (1)
9	Belgium	9	De Bruyne (5), Courtois (2), Hazard (2)
9	Netherlands	9	Van Dijk (5), De Jong (1), De Ligt (1), Robben (1), Sneijder (1)
11	Croatia	6	Modrić (6)
12	Norway	5	Haaland (5)
13	Morocco	3	Hakimi (3)
14	Cameroon	2	Eto'o (2)
14	Poland	2	Lewandowski (2)
14	Serbia	2	Vidić (2)
17	Austria	1	Alaba (1)
17	Canada	1	Davies (1)
17	Colombia	1	Falcao (1)
17	Ivory Coast	1	Drogba (1)
17	Sweden	1	Ibrahimović (1)
17	Ukraine	1	Shevchenko (1)
17	Uruguay	1	Suárez (1)

=== Regional appearances ===
Rank	Region	Apps	Nation(s) (apps)
1	Europe	178	Spain (53), Portugal (23), France (20), England (19), Italy (15), Germany (12), Belgium (9), Netherlands (9), Croatia (6), Norway (5), Serbia (2), Poland (2), Austria (1), Sweden (1), Ukraine (1)
2	South America	57	Brazil (36), Argentina (19), Colombia (1), Uruguay (1)
3	Africa	6	Morocco (3), Cameroon (2), Ivory Coast (1)
4	North America	1	Canada (1)

== FIFPRO Women's World 11 ==
=== Winners ===
Players marked bold won the FIFA World Player of the Year (2001–2015) or The Best FIFA Women's Player (2016–present) in that respective year.

Year	Goalkeeper (club)	Defenders (clubs)	Midfielders (clubs)	Forwards (clubs)
2015	(United States) Hope Solo (Seattle Reign)	(France) Wendie Renard (Lyon); (United States) Meghan Klingenberg (Houston Dash); (Canada) Kadeisha Buchanan (West Virginia Mountaineers); (United States) Julie Johnston (Chicago Red Stars)	**(United States) Carli Lloyd (Houston Dash)**; (France) Amandine Henry (Lyon); (Japan) Aya Miyama (Okayama Yunogo Belle)	(Germany) Célia Šašić (Frankfurt); (France) Eugenie Le Sommer (Lyon); (Germany) Anja Mittag (Rosengård/Paris Saint-Germain)
2016	(United States) Hope Solo (Seattle Reign)	(United States) Ali Krieger (Orlando Pride); (France) Wendie Renard (Lyon); (Sweden) Nilla Fischer (VfL Wolfsburg); (Germany) Leonie Maier (Bayern Munich)	(Brazil) Marta (Rosengård); (United States) **Carli Lloyd (Houston Dash)**; (Germany) Dzsenifer Marozsán (Frankfurt/Lyon)	(France) Eugénie Le Sommer (Lyon); (Norway) Ada Hegerberg (Lyon); (United States) Alex Morgan (Orlando Pride)
2017	(Sweden) Hedvig Lindahl (Chelsea)	(England) Lucy Bronze (Manchester City/Lyon); (France) Wendie Renard (Lyon); (Sweden) Nilla Fischer (VfL Wolfsburg); (Spain) Irene Paredes (Paris Saint-Germain)	(Brazil) Marta (Orlando Pride); (France) Camille Abily (Lyon); (Germany) Dzsenifer Marozsán (Lyon)	(Denmark) Pernille Harder (VfL Wolfsburg); (United States) Alex Morgan (Lyon/Orlando Pride); (Netherlands) **Lieke Martens (Rosengård/Barcelona)**
2019	(Netherlands) Sari van Veenendaal (Arsenal/Atlético Madrid)	(France) Wendie Renard (Lyon); (England) Lucy Bronze (Lyon); (United States) Kelley O'Hara (Utah Royals); (Sweden) Nilla Fischer (VfL Wolfsburg/Linköping)	(France) Amandine Henry (Lyon); (United States) Rose Lavelle (Washington Spirit); (United States) Julie Ertz (Chicago Red Stars)	(United States) Alex Morgan (Orlando Pride); (United States) **Megan Rapinoe (Seattle Reign)**; (Brazil) Marta (Orlando Pride)
2020	(Chile) Christiane Endler (Paris Saint-Germain)	(England) Millie Bright (Chelsea); (England) **Lucy Bronze (Lyon/Manchester City)**; (France) Wendie Renard (Lyon)	(Italy) Barbara Bonansea (Juventus); (Spain) Verónica Boquete (Utah Royals/Milan); (France) Delphine Cascarino (Lyon)	(Denmark) Pernille Harder (VfL Wolfsburg/Chelsea); (United States) Tobin Heath (Portland Thorns/Manchester United); (Netherlands) Vivianne Miedema (Arsenal); (United States) Megan Rapinoe (OL Reign)
2021	(Chile) Christiane Endler (Paris Saint-Germain/Lyon)	(England) Millie Bright (Chelsea); (England) Lucy Bronze (Manchester City); (Sweden) Magdalena Eriksson (Chelsea); (France) Wendie Renard (Lyon)	(Argentina) Estefanía Banini (Levante/Atlético Madrid); (Italy) Barbara Bonansea (Juventus); (United States) Carli Lloyd (NJ/NY Gotham FC)	(Brazil) Marta (Orlando Pride); (Netherlands) Vivianne Miedema (Arsenal); (United States) Alex Morgan (Tottenham Hotspur/Orlando Pride/San Diego Wave FC)
2022	(Chile) Christiane Endler (Lyon)	(England) Lucy Bronze (Manchester City/Barcelona); (Spain) Mapi León (Barcelona); (France) Wendie Renard (Lyon); (England) Leah Williamson (Arsenal)	(Germany) Lena Oberdorf (VfL Wolfsburg); (Spain) **Alexia Putellas (Barcelona)**; (England) Keira Walsh (Manchester City/Barcelona)	(Australia) Sam Kerr (Chelsea); (England) Beth Mead (Arsenal); (United States) Alex Morgan (Orlando Pride/San Diego Wave FC)
2023	(England) Mary Earps (Manchester United)	(England) Lucy Bronze (Barcelona); (Spain) Olga Carmona (Real Madrid); (England) Alex Greenwood (Manchester City)	(England) Ella Toone (Manchester United); (England) Keira Walsh (Barcelona) (Note: FIFPRO listed Walsh's 2023 appearance only for Barcelona, while FIFA listed her for both Manchester City and Barcelona. She played two official matches for Manchester City within the eligible voting period. This appearance is not included in Manchester City's statistics.); (Spain) **Aitana Bonmatí (Barcelona)**	(England) Lauren James (Chelsea); (Australia) Sam Kerr (Chelsea); (United States) Alex Morgan (San Diego Wave FC); (England) Alessia Russo (Manchester United/Arsenal)
2024	(England) Mary Earps (Manchester United/Paris Saint-Germain)	(England) Lucy Bronze (Barcelona/Chelsea); (Spain) Olga Carmona (Real Madrid); (England) Alex Greenwood (Manchester City)	(Spain) **Aitana Bonmatí (Barcelona**); (Spain) Alexia Putellas (Barcelona); (England) Keira Walsh (Barcelona)	(Zambia) Barbra Banda (Shanghai Shengli/Orlando Pride); (Colombia) Linda Caicedo (Real Madrid); (England) Lauren James (Chelsea); (Brazil) Marta (Orlando Pride)
2025	(England) Hannah Hampton (Chelsea)	(Spain) Ona Batlle (Barcelona); (England) Millie Bright (Chelsea); (England) Lucy Bronze (Chelsea); (England) Leah Williamson (Arsenal)	(Spain) **Aitana Bonmatí (Barcelona**); (Morocco) Ghizlane Chebbak (Badalona/Al-Hilal); (Spain) Alexia Putellas (Barcelona)	(Zambia) Barbra Banda (Orlando Pride); (England) Chloe Kelly (Manchester City/Arsenal); (England) Alessia Russo (Arsenal)
2026	(England) Hannah Hampton (Chelsea)	(Spain) Irene Paredes (Barcelona); (Spain) Mapi León (Barcelona); (England) Lucy Bronze (Chelsea); (England) Alex Greenwood (Manchester City)	(Spain) Aitana Bonmatí (Barcelona); (Spain) Alexia Putellas (Barcelona); (England) Ella Toone (Manchester United)	(Zambia) Barbra Banda (Orlando Pride); (Spain) Clàudia Pina (Barcelona); (England) Alessia Russo (Arsenal)

=== Appearances by player ===
Players in bold were part of the most recent World 11.

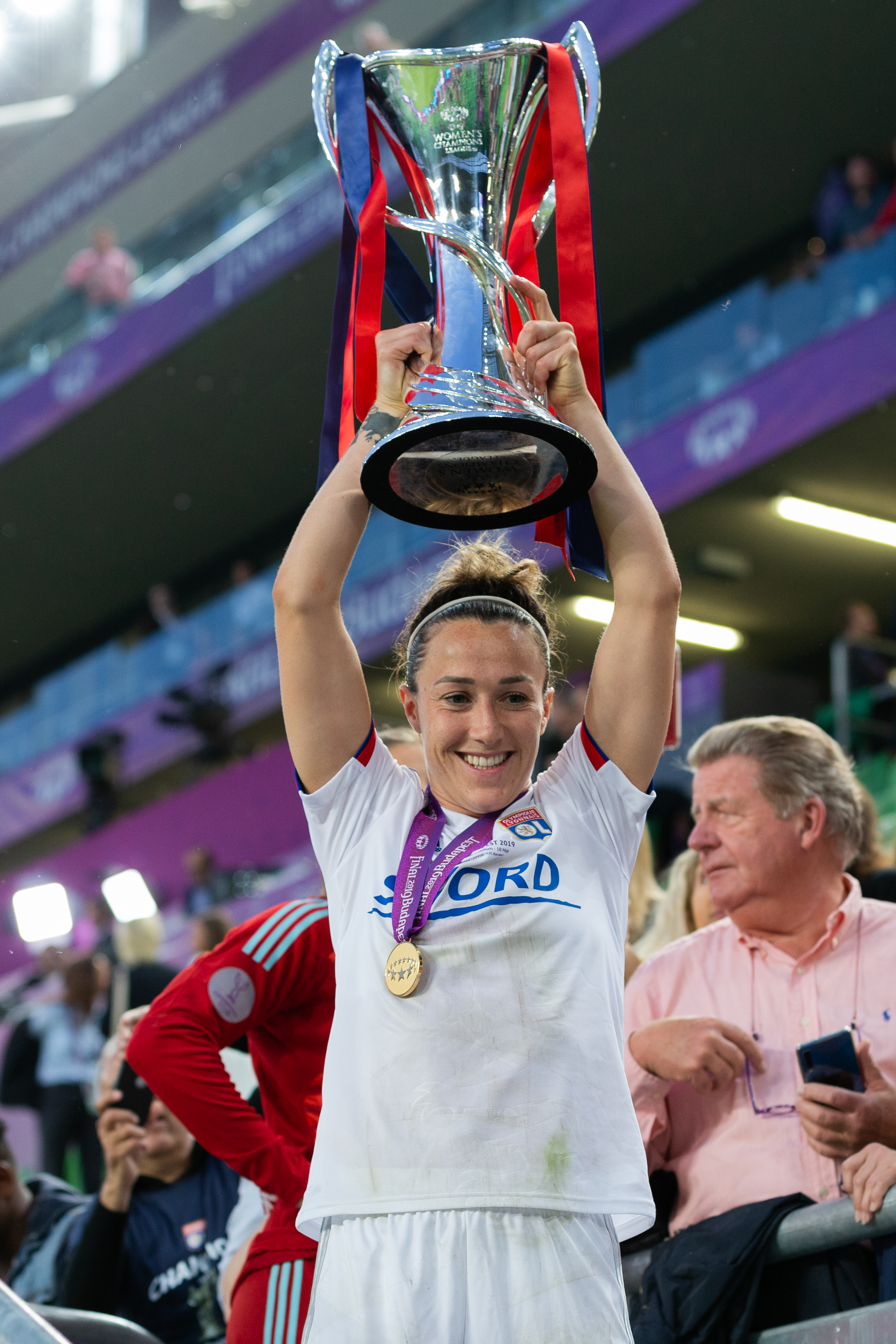
Lucy Bronze has the most appearances on the FIFPRO Women's World 11 with nine.

Rank	Player	Apps	Years	Club(s)
1	(England) **Lucy Bronze**	9	2017, 2019, **2020**, 2021, 2022, 2023, 2024, 2025, 2026	Manchester City, Lyon, Barcelona, Chelsea
2	(France) Wendie Renard	7	2015, 2016, 2017, 2019, 2020, 2021, 2022	Lyon
3	(United States) Alex Morgan	6	2016, 2017, 2019, 2021, 2022, 2023	Lyon, Orlando Pride, Tottenham Hotspur, San Diego Wave
4	(Brazil) Marta	5	2016, 2017, 2019, 2021, 2024	Rosengård, Orlando Pride
5	(Spain) **Alexia Putellas**	4	**2022**, 2024, 2025, 2026	Barcelona
5	(Spain) **Aitana Bonmatí**	4	**2023**, **2024**, **2025**, 2026	Barcelona
7	(Sweden) Nilla Fischer	3	2016, 2017, 2019	VfL Wolfsburg, Linköping
7	(United States) Carli Lloyd	3	**2015**, **2016**, 2021	Houston Dash, NJ/NY Gotham FC
7	(Chile) Christiane Endler	3	2020, 2021, 2022	Paris Saint-Germain, Lyon
7	(England) Keira Walsh	3	2022, 2023, 2024	Manchester City, Barcelona
7	(England) Millie Bright	3	2020, 2021, 2025	Chelsea
7	(Zambia) **Barbra Banda**	3	2024, 2025, 2026	Shanghai Shengli, Orlando Pride
7	(England) **Alex Greenwood**	3	2023, 2024, 2026	Manchester City
7	(England) **Alessia Russo**	3	2023, 2025, 2026	Manchester United, Arsenal
15	(France) Eugénie Le Sommer	2	2015, 2016	Lyon
15	(United States) Hope Solo	2	2015, 2016	Seattle Reign
15	(Germany) Dzsenifer Marozsán	2	2016, 2017	Frankfurt, Lyon
15	(United States) Julie Ertz	2	2015, 2019	Chicago Red Stars
15	(France) Amandine Henry	2	2015, 2019	Lyon
15	(Denmark) Pernille Harder	2	2017, 2020	VfL Wolfsburg, Chelsea
15	(United States) Megan Rapinoe	2	**2019**, 2020	Seattle Reign/OL Reign
15	(Italy) Barbara Bonansea	2	2020, 2021	Juventus
15	(Netherlands) Vivianne Miedema	2	2020, 2021	Arsenal
15	(Australia) Sam Kerr	2	2022, 2023	Chelsea
15	(England) Mary Earps	2	2023, 2024	Manchester United, Paris Saint-Germain
15	(Spain) Olga Carmona	2	2023, 2024	Real Madrid
15	(England) Lauren James	2	2023, 2024	Chelsea
15	(England) Leah Williamson	2	2022, 2025	Arsenal
15	(Spain) **Irene Paredes**	2	2017, 2026	Paris Saint-Germain, Barcelona
15	(Spain) **Mapi León**	2	2022, 2026	Barcelona
15	(England) **Hannah Hampton**	2	2025, 2026	Chelsea
15	(England) **Ella Toone**	2	2023, 2026	Manchester United

=== Appearances by club ===
Players in italics have made appearances with multiple clubs, and appearances are separated accordingly.

Rank	Club	Apps	Player(s) (apps)
1	(France) Lyon	23	Renard (7), Bronze (3), Endler (3), Le Sommer (2), Henry (2), Marozsán (2), Hegerberg (1), Morgan (1), Abily (1), Cascarino (1)
2	(Spain) Barcelona	19	Putellas (4), Bonmatí (4), Bronze (3), Walsh (3), León (2), Martens (1), Paredes (1), Pina (1)
3	(England) Chelsea	15	Bright (3), Bronze (3), Kerr (2), James (2), Hampton (2), Lindahl (1), Harder (1), Eriksson (1)
4	(United States) Orlando Pride	13	Morgan (5), Marta (4), Banda (3), Krieger (1)
5	(England) Arsenal	10	Russo (3), Miedema (2), Williamson (2), Van Veenendaal (1), Mead (1), Kelly (1)
6	(England) Manchester City	9	Bronze (4), Greenwood (3), Walsh (1), Kelly (1)
7	(Germany) VfL Wolfsburg	6	Fischer (3), Harder (2), Oberdorf (1)
8	(England) Manchester United	6	Earps (2), Toone (2), Heath (1), Russo (1)
9	(France) Paris Saint-Germain	5	Endler (2), Mittag (1), Paredes (1), Earps (1)
10	(United States) Seattle Reign/OL Reign	4	Solo (2), Rapinoe (2)
11	(United States) Houston Dash	3	Lloyd (2), Klingenberg (1)
11	(Sweden) Rosengård	3	Mittag (1), Marta (1), Martens (1)
11	(United States) San Diego Wave FC	3	Morgan (3)
11	(Spain) Real Madrid	3	Carmona (2), Caicedo (1)
15	(Spain) Atlético Madrid	2	Van Veenendaal (1), Banini (1)
15	(United States) Chicago Red Stars	2	Ertz (2)
15	(Germany) Frankfurt	2	Šašić (1), Marozsán (1)
15	(Italy) Juventus	2	Bonansea (2)
15	(United States) Utah Royals	2	O'Hara (1), Boquete (1)
20	(Germany) Bayern Munich	1	Maier (1)
20	(Spain) Levante	1	Banini (1)
20	(Sweden) Linköping	1	Fischer (1)
20	(United States) NJ/NY Gotham FC	1	Lloyd (1)
20	(Japan) Okayama Yunogo Belle	1	Miyama (1)
20	(United States) Portland Thorns	1	Heath (1)
20	(China) Shanghai Shengli	1	Banda (1)
20	(England) Tottenham Hotspur	1	Morgan (1)
20	(United States) Washington Spirit	1	Lavelle (1)
20	(United States) West Virginia Mountaineers	1	Buchanan (1)
20	(Spain) Badalona	1	Chebbak (1)
20	(Saudi Arabia) Al-Hilal	1	Chebbak (1)

=== Appearances by nationality ===
Rank	Nation	Apps	Player(s) (apps)
1	England	33	Bronze (9), Walsh (3), Bright (3), Greenwood (3), Russo (3), Earps (2), James (2), Williamson (2), Toone (2), Hampton (2), Mead (1), Kelly (1)
2	United States	20	Morgan (6), Lloyd (3), Solo (2), Ertz (2), Rapinoe (2), Klingenberg (1), Krieger (1), O'Hara (1), Lavelle (1), Heath (1)
3	Spain	17	Putellas (4), Bonmatí (4), Carmona (2), León (2), Paredes (2), Boquete (1), Batlle (1), Pina (1)
4	France	13	Renard (7), Le Sommer (2), Henry (2), Abily (1), Cascarino (1)
5	Germany	6	Marozsán (2), Maier (1), Mittag (1), Šašić (1), Oberdorf (1)
6	Sweden	5	Fischer (3), Lindahl (1), Eriksson (1)
6	Brazil	5	Marta (5)
8	Netherlands	4	Miedema (2), Martens (1), Van Veenendaal (1)
9	Chile	3	Endler (3)
9	Zambia	3	Banda (3)
11	Australia	2	Kerr (2)
11	Denmark	2	Harder (2)
11	Italy	2	Bonansea (2)
14	Argentina	1	Banini (1)
14	Canada	1	Buchanan (1)
14	Japan	1	Miyama (1)
14	Norway	1	Hegerberg (1)
14	Colombia	1	Caicedo (1)
14	Morocco	1	Chebbak (1)

=== Regional appearances ===
Rank	Region	Apps	Nation(s) (apps)
1	Europe	83	England (33), Spain (17), France (13), Germany (6), Sweden (5), Netherlands (4), Denmark (2), Italy (2), Norway (1)
2	North America	21	United States (20), Canada (1)
3	South America	10	Brazil (5), Chile (3), Argentina (1), Colombia (1)
4	Africa	4	Zambia (3), Morocco (1)
5	Asia	3	Australia (2), Japan (1)
