= Chloe Kelly =

English footballer (born 1998)

Chloe Kelly MBE
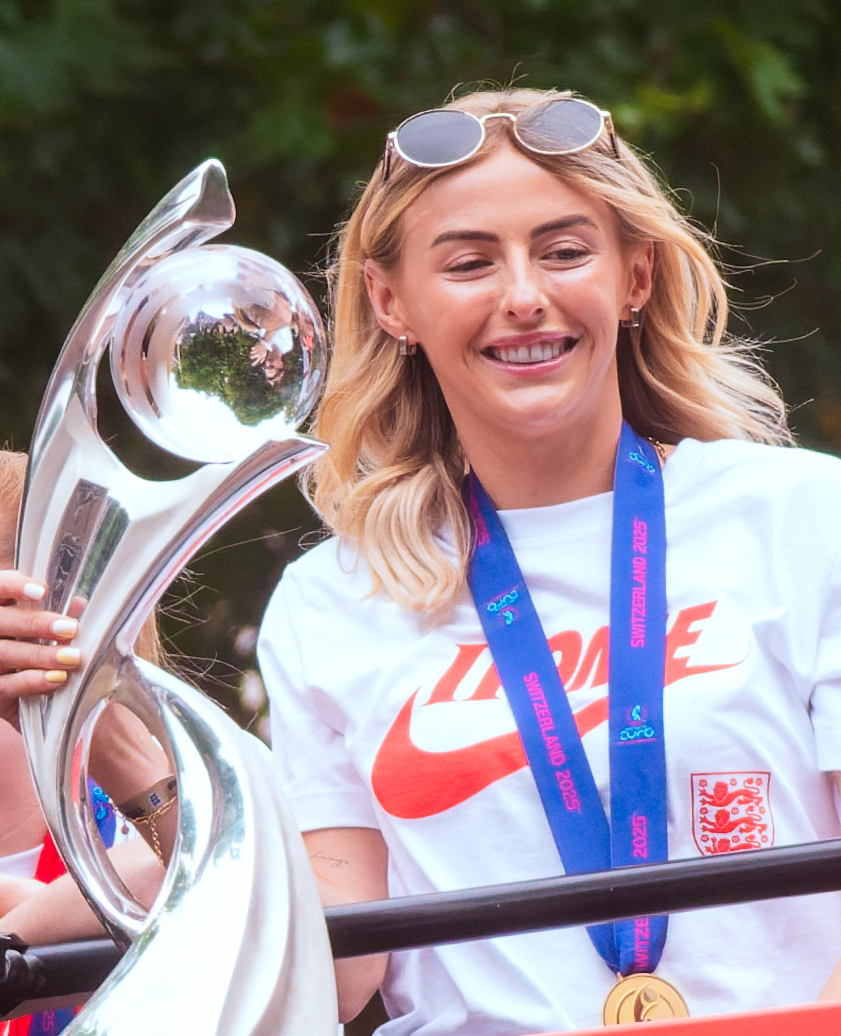
- Kelly in Lionesses Bus Celebration 2025

Personal information
- Full name: Chloe Maggie Kelly
- Date of birth: 15 January 1998 (age 28)
- Place of birth: London, England
- Height: 5 ft 6 in (1.68 m)
- Position: Forward

Team information
- Current team: Arsenal
- Number: 18

Youth career
- Queens Park Rangers
- 2010–2015: Arsenal

Senior career*
Years	Team	Apps	(Gls)
2015–2018	Arsenal	13	(3)
2016–2018	→ Everton (loan)	13	(5)
2018–2020	Everton	32	(11)
2020–2025	Manchester City	75	(21)
2025	→ Arsenal (loan)	8	(2)
2025–	Arsenal	20	(5)

International career^{‡}
2011–2013	England U15	2	(0)
2013–2015	England U17	27	(7)
2016–2017	England U19	12	(3)
2018	England U20	7	(1)
2018–	England	67	(9)
Medal record
Women's football
Representing England
UEFA Women's Championship
Winner	2022 England
Winner	2025 Switzerland
UEFA–CONMEBOL Finalissima
Winner	2023 England
FIFA Women's World Cup
Runner-up	2023 Australia and New Zealand
FIFA U-20 Women's World Cup
Third place	2018 France
- * Club domestic league appearances and goals as of 21:50, 27 September 2026 (UTC) ‡ National team caps and goals as of 09:30, 10 June 2026 (UTC)

Chloe Maggie Kelly (born 15 January 1998) is an English professional footballer who plays as a forward for Women's Super League club Arsenal and the England national team. Kelly started her senior career at Arsenal, prior to going on loan to Everton, and joining the team permanently in 2018. With Manchester City, she is a 2019–20 FA Cup and 2021–22 League Cup winner, has twice been named in the PFA WSL Team of the Year, and was the joint top assist provider in the 2020–21 WSL season. With Arsenal, she is a 2024–25 UEFA Champions League winner.

Kelly represented England from U17 to U20 levels, before making her senior debut in 2018. She represented England in Euro 2022, where as a substitute she scored the winning goal in the final. Kelly was awarded the Golden Boot in the 2023 Arnold Clark Cup, scored the winning penalty in the shoot-out at the 2023 Finalissima, and is a 2023 World Cup runner-up with England. In the UEFA Euro 2025, she successfully converted the decisive penalty to, once again, win the tournament for the Lionesses.

== Club career ==
=== Arsenal ===
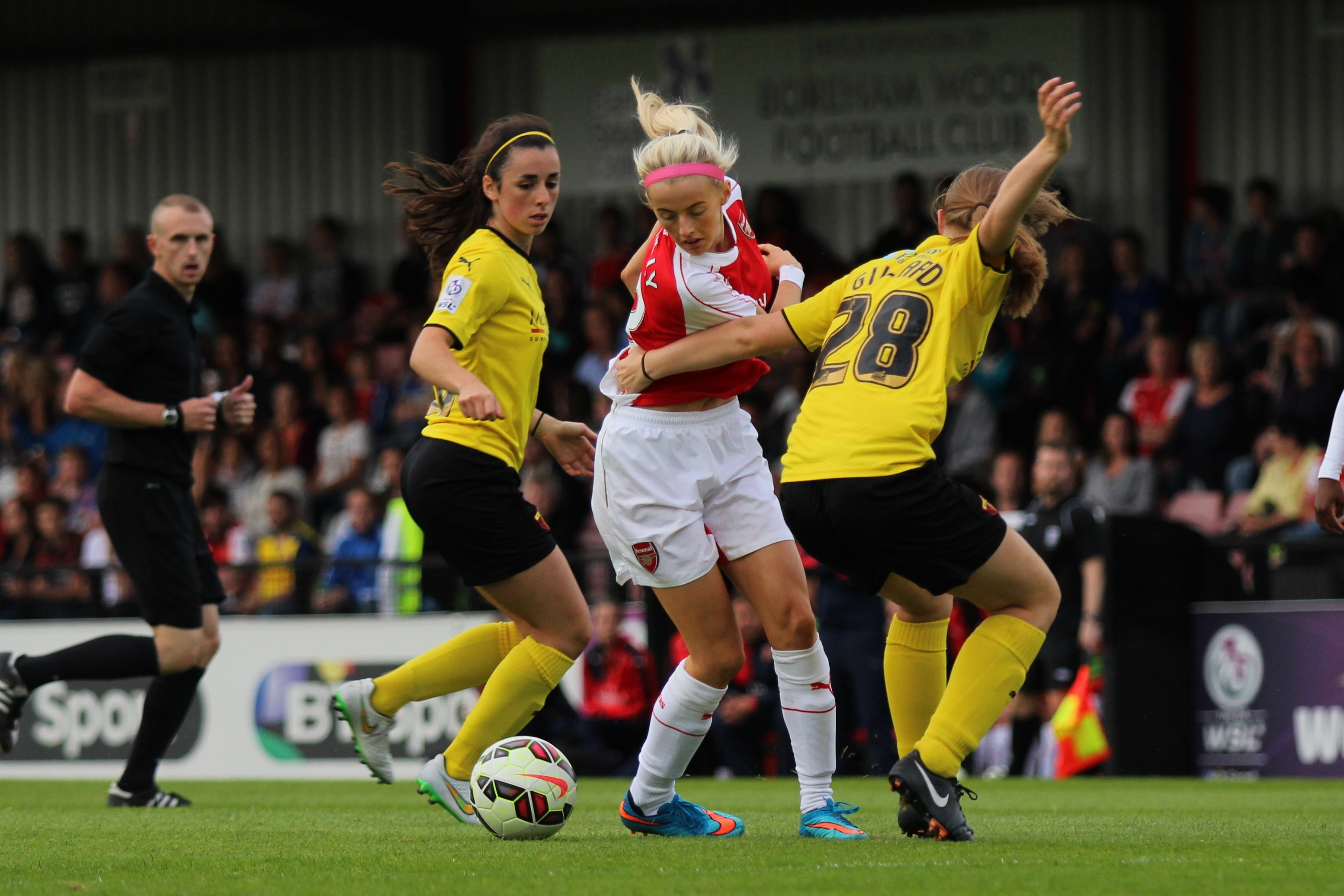
Kelly during her Arsenal debut, July 2015

On 23 July 2015, aged 17, Kelly made her full debut for the Arsenal first team in the Continental Cup against Watford, scoring her first goal just 22 minutes into the match. She made her second appearance for the club during a 2–1 win over Notts County, substituting for Rachel Yankey in the 54th minute.

In February 2016, Kelly signed her first senior contract. She made one appearance in the team's 5–1 win over Sunderland on 25 June, before being loaned to FA WSL 2 side Everton.

After returning to Arsenal in October of the same year, she made three more appearances for Arsenal during the 2016 FA WSL season. The team finished the regular season in third place with a 10–4–2 record. Arsenal also won the 2016 FA Cup Final at Wembley Stadium. Though Kelly was in the squad, she did not play during the team's 1–0 win over Chelsea.

In February 2017, Kelly signed a new contract with Arsenal. She made seven appearances for the club and scored two goals before being loaned to Everton in July.

=== Everton ===
All goals, including Kelly's hat-trick, in Everton 4–0 Oxford

In June 2016, Kelly joined FA WSL 2 side Everton on a three-month loan in order to gain additional first team experience. She made nine starts for the team, and scored two goals.

In July 2017, Kelly returned to newly-promoted FA WSL 1 Everton for a second loan spell. Kelly made four appearances for Everton and scored two goals in the remaining months of 2017.

In the WSL Cup, Kelly scored her first senior hat-trick on 16 November 2017 in a 4–0 victory against Oxford United.

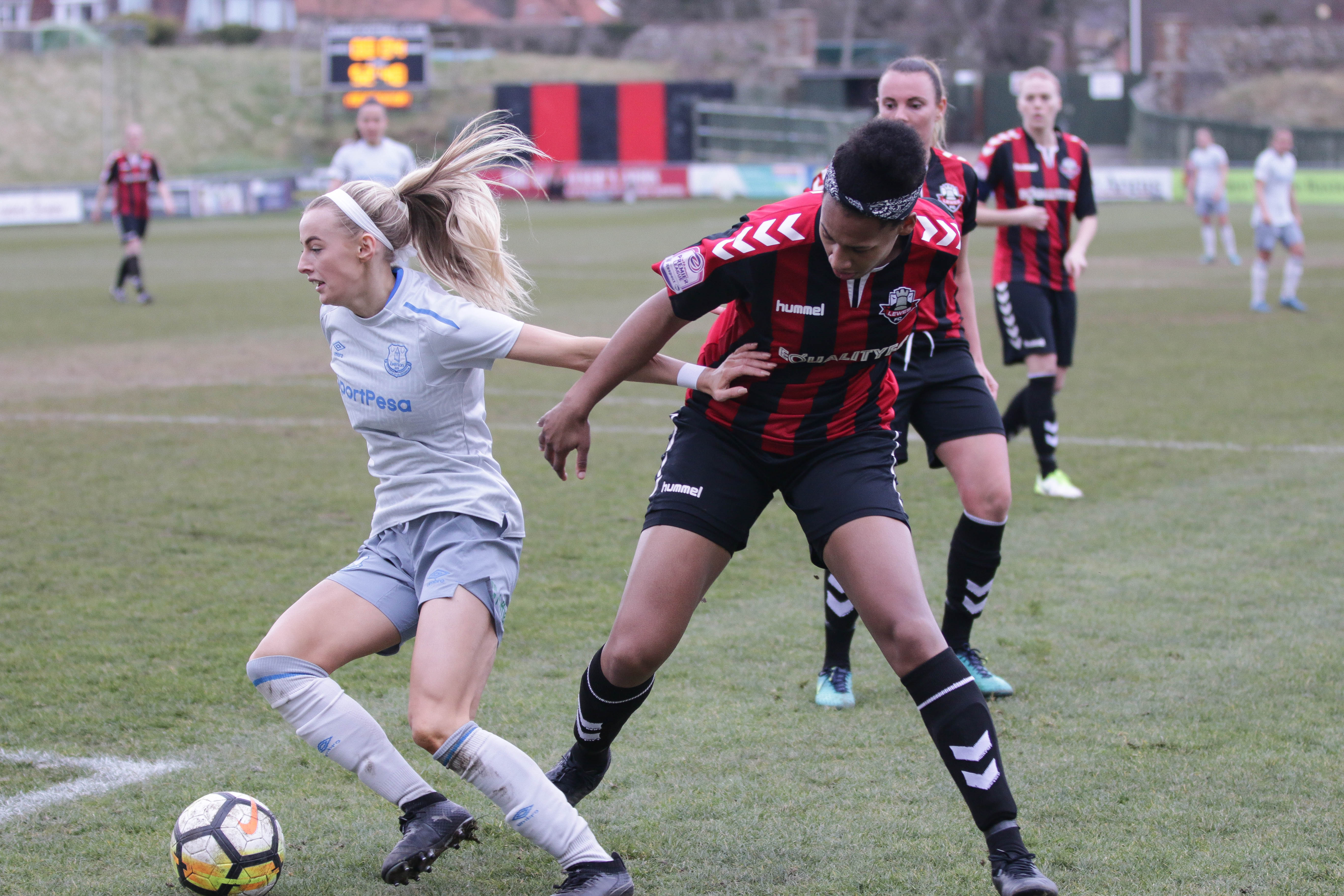
Kelly (left) pushes off a Lewes FC defender, 2018

In January 2018, Kelly made a permanent transfer to Everton on contract through summer 2020, alongside Arsenal teammate Taylor Hinds. She made a total of 15 appearances for Everton during the 2017–18 FA WSL season and scored two goals. Everton finished in ninth place with a 4–12–2 record. During the 2018-19 FA WSL season, Kelly made eleven appearances and scored a goal during the team's 3–3 draw against Brighton & Hove Albion despite playing on an ankle injury throughout the season. Everton finished in 10th place.

After having ankle surgery, 2019 marked a turning point for Kelly's career. She scored nine goals in 12 games for Everton during the 2019–20 FA WSL season helping the club climb the table to sixth place. She was the fourth-highest scorer in the league and the top goalscorer for Everton. During the team's second game of the season, Kelly scored a brace lifting Everton to a 2–0 win. Her second goal of the match – a long-range goal – went viral. Kelly was named the league's Player of the Month for September and was shortlisted for October’s award. Kelly's performance during the early part of the season earned her a call-up to the national team camp. In January 2020, Kelly scored a hat trick against Reading lifting Everton to a 3–1 win. It was the first hat-trick by an Everton player since 2013.

In June 2020, Kelly left Everton after rejecting a new contract.

=== Manchester City ===
On 3 July 2020, it was announced Kelly had signed a two-year contract with Manchester City. In September 2020, she was named to the PFA WSL Team of the Year. On 4 October, she scored a brace against Tottenham Hotspur lifting the team to a 4–1 win. During the team's 3–1 loss to Chelsea a few days later, she converted a penalty kick in the 73rd minute for Manchester City's lone goal of the match. In her debut season, she produced 16 goals and 14 assists.

On 2 May 2021, Kelly suffered an ACL injury in the game against Birmingham City after scoring two goals in the first half. She contributed ten goals and eleven assists during the season before her injury.

On 10 February 2022, she signed a three-year contract extension with the club. Kelly scored two goals in the 4–3 victory over Liverpool in the 2023–24 Conti Cup.

On 29 January 2025, Kelly posted a statement to her social media pages in which she said that she did not see her future at Manchester City beyond the end of the season when her contract expired. Upon loaning her to Arsenal the following day, Manchester City stated in their announcement of the move that she was set to depart the club permanently in the summer. Kelly confirmed her departure on 1 July.

=== Return to Arsenal ===
Kelly was loaned back to Arsenal for the remainder of the 2024–25 season on 30 January 2025. On 16 February, Kelly made her return to the pitch for Arsenal, 2,815 days after her last game played for the team. On 24 May, Kelly started for Arsenal in the 2025 Champions League final as they defeated Barcelona 1–0 to win their second European title.

On 2 July 2025, it was announced that Kelly had re-signed for Arsenal on a permanent basis. In the first game of the 2025–26 season, Kelly scored to give Arsenal the lead at half time in an eventual 4–1 victory over London City Lionesses. She scored her first hat-trick for the club during a 5–0 win against West Ham United on 21 March 2026.

== International career ==
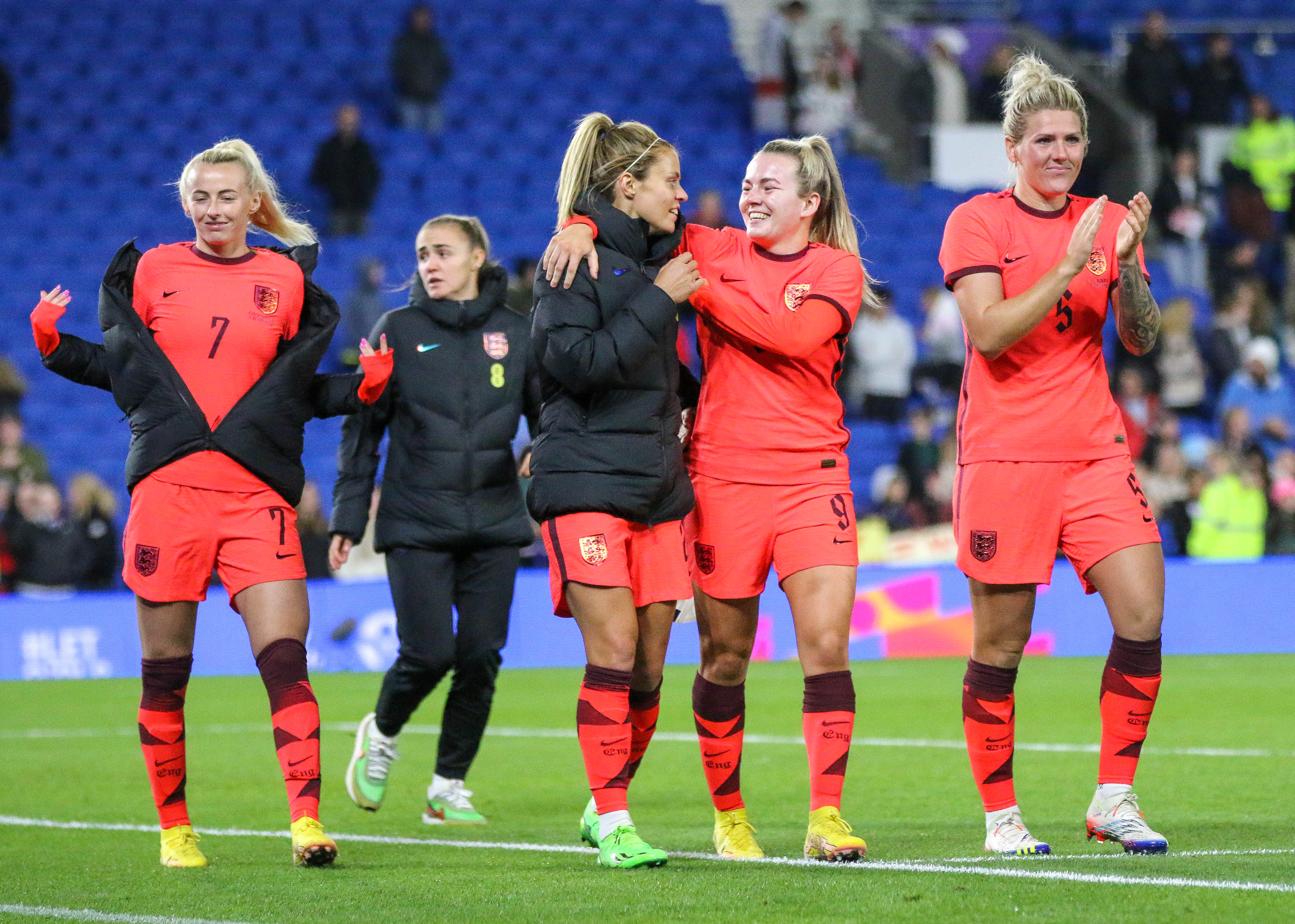
Kelly (left) with England women's team, October 2022

Kelly has represented England on the senior national team as well as numerous youth national teams, including the under-17 and under-20 squads. She is known for her pace, strength, and direct dribbling. Often deployed as a winger or wide forward, she is equally adept at cutting inside to shoot or delivering crosses. Her ability to perform in high-pressure moments has earned her a reputation as a “big-game player.”

=== Youth ===
In 2014, Kelly competed at the 2014 UEFA Under-17 Championship in England, coming fourth, and the 2015 UEFA Under-17 Championship in Iceland, exiting in the group stage. In November 2015, she scored an equaliser against Italy to earn a draw for the under-19 team.

In August 2018, Kelly was part of the England U20 squad that claimed bronze at the 2018 FIFA U-20 World Cup.

=== Senior ===
Kelly made her senior national team debut in November 2018, coming in as a substitute in a 3–0 friendly win over Austria in Vienna.

After coming back from an 11-month absence following an anterior cruciate ligament injury, Kelly scored her first goal for England on 16 June 2022, during a 3–0 victory over Belgium.

External video
- Chloe Kelly's game-winning goal and celebration in the Euro 2022 final, published by ESPN FC via YouTube, (Note: Only available in the United States) 31 July 2022.

Kelly was named in the England squad for UEFA Euro 2022, which England was hosting, in June 2022. On 31 July 2022, Kelly came off the bench to score the winning goal in the 110th minute of the Euro 2022 final match against Germany, securing the win for England in extra time. Once she was confirmed onside, she celebrated by removing her shirt and swinging it around her head, revealing a sports bra and receiving a yellow card as a result. She was later praised on social media as uniting and empowering women. Kelly's celebration emulated American defender Brandi Chastain, who had celebrated in a similar way after she scored the winning penalty for the United States against China in the 1999 World Cup final. Chastain congratulated her and said it put "a big smile on my face" later swapping shirts with Kelly after England's friendly against the United States at Wembley that October.

In the 2023 Arnold Clark Cup, Kelly scored three goals in three games, making her Golden Boot winner of the tournament.

At the 2023 Finalissima final, Kelly stepped up in the penalty shootout against Brazil and successfully made it 4–2, giving England their first Finalissima victory.

On 31 May 2023, Kelly was named to the squad for the 2023 FIFA World Cup in July 2023. She scored in England's 6–1 defeat of China. Kelly also scored England’s winning penalty in the Round of 16 shootout against Nigeria. The speed of her kick was measured at having a top speed of 69 miles per hour (111 km/h). It was widely reported that the strike was "faster than any goal scored in the Premier League in the 2022–23 season"; her goal's top speed was compared with the most powerful goal of the 2022–23 Premier League season (which is based on the average speed of goals scored outside of the penalty area), scored by Saïd Benrahma. Showbiz writer James Brinsford responded to seeing these reports by arguing there could not be statistical data to accurately compare Kelly's and Saïd's shots.

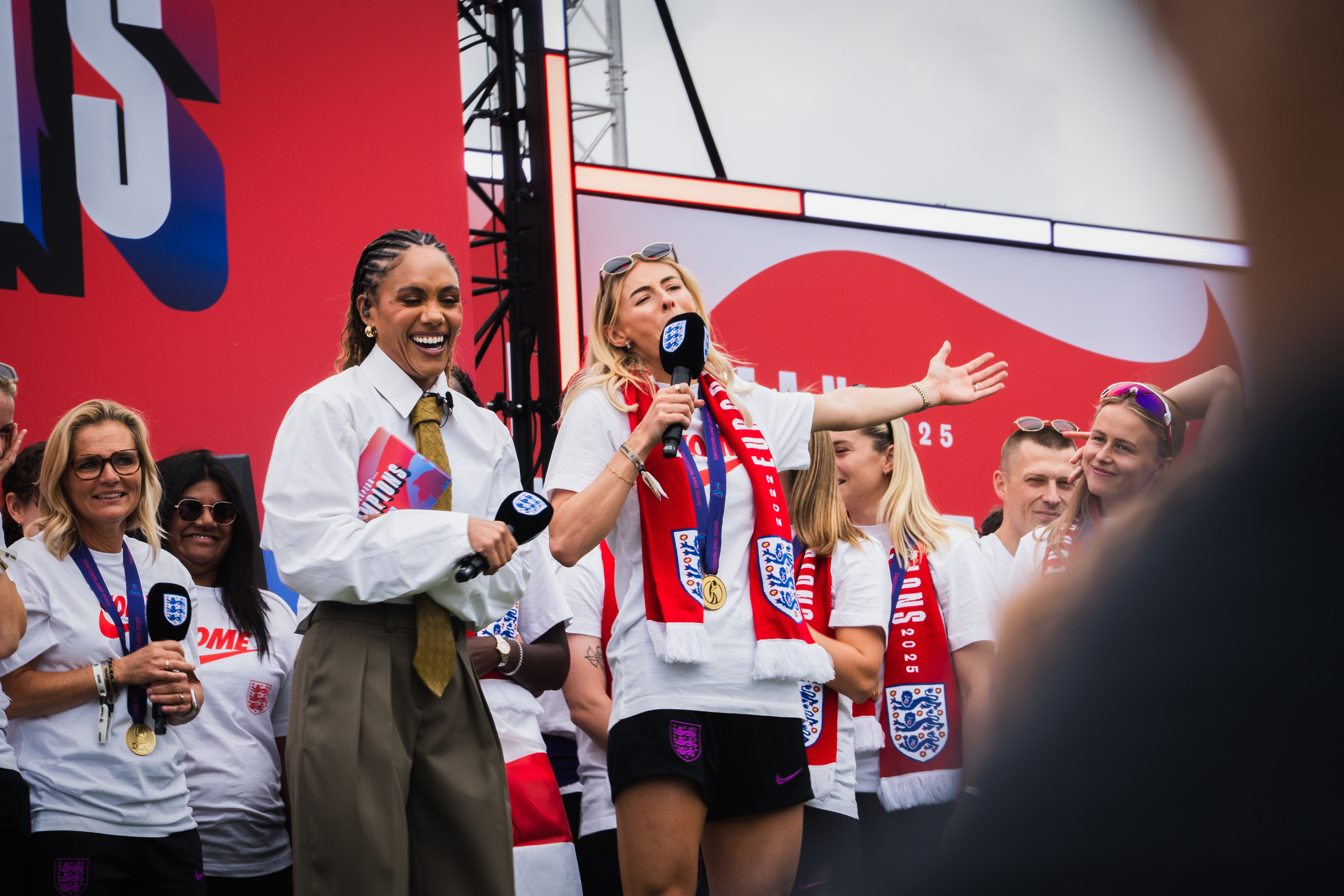
Kelly (centre right) replying "what pressure?!" when asked by Alex Scott (centre left) about taking the penalty that gave England their second Euro title, at their victory parade two days after the final

Following little play time at her club, Kelly missed out on being selected for the squad for the upcoming Nations League matches ahead of the Euros. However, following an injury to Beth Mead, Kelly was recalled to the squad. She came on as a substitute in their opening Nations League match against Portugal. On 26 February 2025, Kelly made her 50th cap for England against Spain. On 6 June, she was named in England's squad for UEFA Euro 2025. On 22 July, she scored the winning goal in the 119th minute, drilling home the rebounding ball after her penalty was saved in the semifinal against Italy. On 27 July 2025, Kelly came on as a substitute in the tournament's final, providing the cross which led to Alessia Russo's goal. In the game's penalty shootout, Kelly scored the penalty that secured England's victory against Spain and their second European title.

== Coaching ==
=== Baller League UK ===
In November 2024, it was announced that Kelly was set to manage one of the 12 teams in the upcoming Baller League UK, a six-a-side football league.

== Personal life ==
Kelly was born on 15 January 1998 to Jane and Noel Kelly. She was raised in the west London district of Hanwell where she went to school at Elthorne Park High School. She was the youngest of seven siblings. She began playing football at a young age with her five brothers. She often played in football cages in Windmill Park in Southall, which she credits with making her the player she became. As part of the "Where Greatness Is Made" campaign, a plaque honouring Kelly was installed at the cages in 2022.

Before joining Arsenal's Centre of Excellence, she played for Queens Park Rangers. She travelled two hours round trip by train as a young teenager to train with Arsenal, who she joined at the age of twelve in 2010. Her footballing idol when she was growing up was Bobby Zamora, once also a Queens Park Rangers player.

Kelly married her long-term boyfriend, Scott Moore, in July 2024.

== Career statistics ==
=== Club ===
As of match played 27 September 2026

Appearances and goals by club, season and competition
Club	Season	League			FA Cup		League Cup		Europe		Other		Total	
Club	Season	Division	Apps	Goals	Apps	Goals	Apps	Goals	Apps	Goals	Apps	Goals	Apps	Goals
Arsenal	2015	Women's Super League	2	0	0	0	3	2	—		—		5	2
Arsenal	2016	Women's Super League	4	1	0	0	0	0	—		—		4	1
Arsenal	2017	Women's Super League	7	2	0	0	—		—		—		7	2
Arsenal	Total		13	3	0	0	3	2	0	0	0	0	16	5
Everton (loan)	2016	Women's Super League 2	8	3	0	0	1	0	—		—		9	3
Everton (loan)	2017–18	Women's Super League	5	2	0	0	5	5	—		—		10	7
Everton	2017–18	Women's Super League	10	1	0	0	0	0	—		—		10	1
Everton	2018–19	Women's Super League	11	1	0	0	3	0	—		—		14	1
Everton	2019–20	Women's Super League	11	9	2	0	4	0	—		—		17	9
Everton	Total		45	16	2	0	13	5	0	0	0	0	60	21
Manchester City	2020–21	Women's Super League	21	10	2	2	1	1	6	0	—		30	13
Manchester City	2021–22	Women's Super League	5	1	2	1	0	0	—		—		7	2
Manchester City	2022–23	Women's Super League	22	5	3	1	3	0	2	0	—		30	6
Manchester City	2023–24	Women's Super League	21	5	3	0	6	3	—		—		30	8
Manchester City	2024–25	Women's Super League	6	0	1	0	0	0	5	2	—		12	2
Manchester City	Total		75	21	11	4	10	4	13	2	0	0	109	31
Arsenal (loan)	2024–25	Women’s Super League	8	2	0	0	0	0	5	0	—		13	2
Arsenal	2025–26	Women's Super League	16	5	2	0	0	0	8	1	2 (Note: Appearances in FIFA Women's Champions Cup)	0	28	6
Arsenal	2026–27	Women's Super League	4	0	0	0	—		1	0	—		5	0
Arsenal	Total		28	7	2	0	0	0	14	1	2	0	46	8
Career total			161	47	15	4	26	11	27	3	2	0	231	65

=== International ===
As of match played 9 June 2026

Appearances and goals by national team and year
National team	Year	Apps	Goals
England	2018	1	0
England	2019	0	0
England	2020	3	0
England	2021	3	0
England	2022	13	3
England	2023	18	4
England	2024	10	0
England	2025	15	2
England	2026	4	0
Total		67	9

Scores and results list England's goal tally first, score column indicates score after each Kelly goal.

List of international goals scored by Chloe Kelly
No.	Date	Venue	Opponent	Score	Result	Competition
1	16 June 2022	Molineux Stadium, Wolverhampton, England	Belgium	1–0	3–0	Friendly
2	31 July 2022	Wembley Stadium, London, England	Germany	2–1	2–1 (a.e.t.)	UEFA Women's Euro 2022
3	11 November 2022	Pinatar Arena, Murcia, Spain	Japan	2–0	4–0	Friendly
4	16 February 2023	Stadium MK, Milton Keynes, England	South Korea	2–0	4–0	2023 Arnold Clark Cup
5	22 February 2023	Ashton Gate Stadium, Bristol, England	Belgium	1–0	6–1	2023 Arnold Clark Cup
6	22 February 2023	Ashton Gate Stadium, Bristol, England	Belgium	3–0	6–1	2023 Arnold Clark Cup
7	1 August 2023	Hindmarsh Stadium, Adelaide, Australia	China	5–1	6–1	2023 FIFA Women's World Cup
8	30 May 2025	Wembley Stadium, London, England	Portugal	6–0	6–0	2025 UEFA Women's Nations League A
9	22 July 2025	Stade de Genève, Geneva, Switzerland	Italy	2–1	2–1 (a.e.t.)	UEFA Women's Euro 2025

== Honours ==
Arsenal

- Women's FA Cup: 2015–16
- UEFA Women's Champions League: 2024–25
- FIFA Women's Champions Cup: 2026

Manchester City

- Women's FA Cup: 2019–20
- FA Women's League Cup: 2021–22

England U20

- FIFA U-20 Women's World Cup third place: 2018

England

- UEFA Women's Championship: 2022, 2025
- Women's Finalissima: 2023
- Arnold Clark Cup: 2023
- FIFA Women's World Cup runner-up: 2023

Individual

- FA WSL PFA Team of the Year: 2019–20, 2020–21
- FA WSL Player of the Month: September 2019, April 2023
- FA WSL Top Assist Provider: 2020–21
- Arnold Clark Cup Golden Boot: 2023
- Freedom of the City of London (announced 1 August 2022)
- UEFA Women's Championship Team of the Tournament: 2025

== See also ==
- List of England women's international footballers
- List of UEFA Women's Championship goalscorers
- List of FA WSL hat-tricks
