= PFA Women's Young Player of the Year =

English women's football award

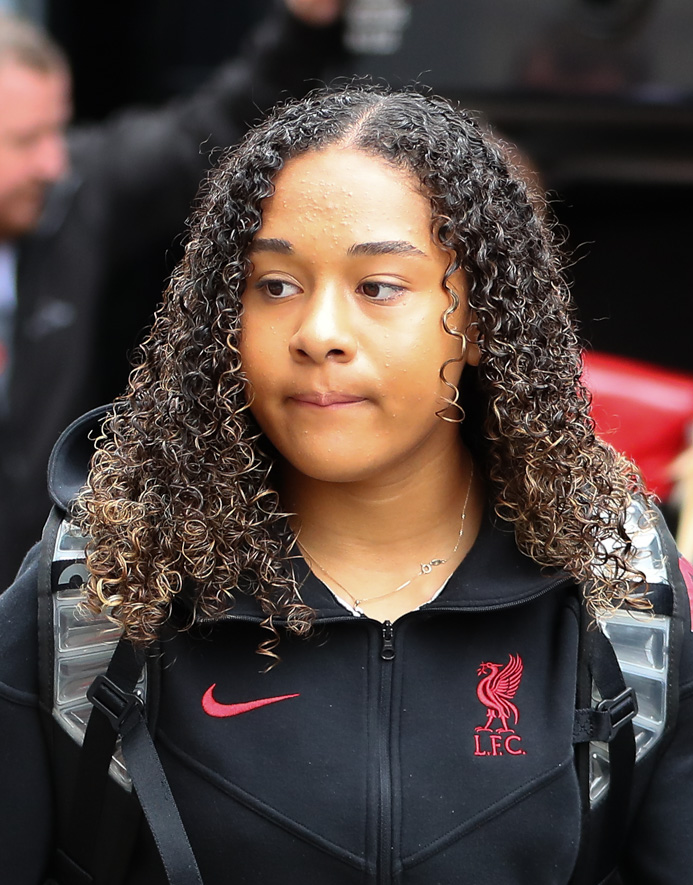
2026 winner Olivia Smith

The Professional Footballers' Association Women's Young Player of the Year (commonly referred to as PFA Young Player of the Year) is an annual award given to the player who is voted to have been the best of the year in English women's football. The award has been presented since the 2013–14 season and the winner is chosen by a vote amongst the members of the players' trade union, the Professional Footballers' Association (PFA).

The current holder is Olivia Smith.

== Winners ==
The women's award has been presented since 2014 while the men's PFA Players' Player of the Year has been awarded since 1974. The table below also indicates the age at which the player received the award and where the winning player also won one or more of the other major "player of the year" awards in English women's football, namely the PFA Women's Players' Player of the Year award.

Year		Player	Club	Age (at the time of award)	Also won	Notes
2013–14	(England)	Martha Harris	Liverpool	19 years, 251 days		
2014–15	(England)	Leah Williamson	Arsenal	18 years, 28 days		
2015–16	(England)	Beth Mead	Sunderland	20 years, 351 days		
2016–17	(England)	Jess Carter	Birmingham City	19 years, 178 days		
2017–18	(England)	Lauren Hemp	Bristol City	17 years, 258 days		
2018–19	(England)	Georgia Stanway	Manchester City	20 years, 115 days		
2019–20	(England)	Lauren Hemp	Manchester City	20 years, 32 days		
2020–21	(England)	Lauren Hemp	Manchester City	20 years, 303 days		
2021–22	(England)	Lauren Hemp	Manchester City	21 years, 306 days		
2022–23	(England)	Lauren James	Chelsea	21 years, 334 days		
2023–24	(England)	Grace Clinton	Tottenham Hotspur	21 years, 142 days		
2024–25	(Canada)	Olivia Smith	Liverpool	21 years, 14 days		
2025–26	(Canada)	Olivia Smith	Arsenal	22 years, 20 days		

== Breakdown of winners ==
=== By country ===
Country	Number of wins	Winning years
England	11	2013–14, 2014–15, 2015–16, 2016–17, 2017–18, 2018–19, 2019–20, 2020–21, 2021–22, 2022–23, 2023–24
Canada	2	2024–25, 2025–26

=== By club ===
Club	Number of wins	Winning years
Manchester City	4	2018–19, 2019–20, 2020–21, 2021–22
Arsenal	2	2014–15, 2025–26
Liverpool	2	2013–14, 2024–25
Sunderland	1	2015–16
Birmingham City	1	2016–17
Bristol City	1	2017–18
Chelsea	1	2022–23
Tottenham Hotspur	1	2023–24

== See also ==
- List of sports awards honoring women
