= 2023 Women's Finalissima =

- Event: Women's Finalissima
England	Brazil
1	1
- England won 4–2 on penalties
- Date: 6 April 2023
- Venue: Wembley Stadium, London
- Player of the Match: Keira Walsh (England)
- Referee: Stéphanie Frappart (France)
- Attendance: 83,132
- Weather: Cloudy night 9 °C (48 °F); 72% humidity

The 2023 Women's Finalissima was the first edition of the Women's Finalissima, an intercontinental women's football match between the winners of the most recent European and South American championships. The match featured England, winners of UEFA Women's Euro 2022, and Brazil, winners of the 2022 Copa América Femenina. It was played at Wembley Stadium in London on 6 April 2023. The match was organised by UEFA and CONMEBOL as part of a renewed partnership between the two confederations.

England won the match 4–2 on penalties following a 1–1 draw after 90 minutes to secure the inaugural Women's Finalissima title.

== Background ==
On 12 February 2020, UEFA and CONMEBOL signed a renewed memorandum of understanding meant to enhance cooperation between the two organisations. As part of the agreement, a joint UEFA–CONMEBOL committee examined the possibility of staging European–South American intercontinental matches, for both men's and women's football and across various age groups. In September 2021, UEFA and CONMEBOL announced the revival of the Artemio Franchi Cup between the winners of the men's UEFA European Championship and Copa América. On 15 December 2021, UEFA and CONMEBOL again signed a renewed memorandum of understanding lasting until 2028, which included specific provisions on opening a joint office in London, England and the potential organisation of various football events. On 2 June 2022, the day after staging the 2022 Finalissima, CONMEBOL and UEFA announced a series of new events between teams from the two confederations. This included the Women's Finalissima, to be played by the winners of South America's Copa América Femenina and Europe's UEFA Women's Championship. As part of the announcement, the first edition was confirmed to take place in Europe, with the exact date and venue to be announced at a later date. The match was provisionally scheduled to be held during the FIFA International Match Calendar window of 13 to 25 February 2023, but was later confirmed to take place on 6 April 2023 in London. On 26 October 2022, it was confirmed the match would take place at Wembley Stadium.

In the UK, the match was broadcast live on TV by ITV1 and STV, with radio coverage being provided by BBC Radio 5 Live.

== Teams ==
Team	Confederation	Qualification	FIFA Rankings March 2023
England	UEFA	Winners of UEFA Women's Euro 2022	4
Brazil	CONMEBOL	Winners of the 2022 Copa América Femenina	9

England qualified for the match by virtue of winning UEFA Women's Euro 2022 as hosts, having defeated Germany 2–1 after extra time in the final. The win secured England's first major women's football title. Brazil qualified for the match by virtue of winning the 2022 Copa América Femenina, having defeated hosts Colombia 1–0 in the final. The win was Brazil's eighth Copa América title.

== Match ==
=== Details ===
6 April 2023
19:45 BST

England	1–1	Brazil
Toone 23'	Report	Andressa 90+3'
Penalties
Stanway (penalty scored); Toone (penalty missed); Daly (penalty scored); Greenwood (penalty scored); Kelly (penalty scored)	4–2	(penalty scored) Adriana; (penalty missed) Tamires; (penalty missed) Rafaelle; (penalty scored) Kerolin

Wembley Stadium, London
Attendance: 83,132
Referee: Stéphanie Frappart (France)

England	Brazil

GK	1	Mary Earps	(yellow card) 76'
RB	2	Lucy Bronze
CB	5	Leah Williamson (c)
CB	6	Alex Greenwood
LB	3	Jess Carter
DM	4	Keira Walsh
CM	8	Georgia Stanway
CM	10	Ella Toone
RW	7	Lauren James		(substituted off) 74'
LW	11	Lauren Hemp	(yellow card) 82'	(substituted off) 88'
CF	9	Alessia Russo		(substituted off) 74'
Substitutes:
GK	13	Ellie Roebuck
GK	21	Hannah Hampton
DF	12	Maya Le Tissier
DF	14	Esme Morgan
DF	15	Niamh Charles
DF	23	Lotte Wubben-Moy
MF	16	Jordan Nobbs
MF	18	Laura Coombs
FW	17	Chloe Kelly		(substituted on) 74'
FW	19	Rachel Daly		(substituted on) 74'
FW	20	Jess Park
FW	22	Katie Robinson		(substituted on) 88'
Manager:
(Netherlands) Sarina Wiegman

GK	12	Letícia Izidoro
RB	14	Lauren		(substituted off) 46'
CB	3	Kathellen
CB	4	Rafaelle (c)	(yellow card) 39'
LB	6	Tamires
RM	2	Antônia		(substituted off) 87'
CM	17	Ary Borges		(substituted off) 87'
CM	15	Luana		(substituted off) 69'
LM	21	Kerolin
CF	16	Beatriz		(substituted off) 46'
CF	18	Geyse
Substitutes:
GK	1	Camila
GK	22	Luciana
DF	13	Tarciane
DF	19	Yasmim
DF	20	Fe Palermo		(substituted on) 87'
MF	7	Duda Francelino		(substituted on) 69'
MF	8	Ana Vitória
MF	9	Andressa		(substituted on) 46'
MF	10	Duda Santos
MF	25	Gabi Portilho
FW	11	Adriana		(substituted on) 46'
FW	23	Gabi Nunes		(substituted on) 87'
Manager:
(Sweden) Pia Sundhage

Player of the Match:
Keira Walsh (England)

Assistant referees:
Élodie Coppola (France)
Manuela Nicolosi (France)
Fourth official:
Esther Staubli (Switzerland)
Video assistant referee:
Jérôme Brisard (France)
Assistant video assistant referee:
Maïka Vanderstichel (France)

Match rules

- 90 minutes
- Penalty shoot-out if scores level
- Maximum of twelve named substitutes
- Maximum of five substitutions (Note: Each team was given only three opportunities to make substitutions, excluding substitutions made at half-time.)

=== Statistics ===
First half
Statistic	England	Brazil
Goals scored	1	0
Total shots	9	1
Shots on target	4	0
Saves	0	3
Ball possession	73%	27%
Corner kicks	3	1
Fouls committed	3	5
Offsides	3	1
Yellow cards	0	1
Red cards	0	0

Second half
Statistic	England	Brazil
Goals scored	0	1
Total shots	2	8
Shots on target	1	3
Saves	2	1
Ball possession	55%	45%
Corner kicks	1	2
Fouls committed	5	5
Offsides	4	1
Yellow cards	2	0
Red cards	0	0

Overall
Statistic	England	Brazil
Goals scored	1	1
Total shots	11	9
Shots on target	5	3
Saves	2	4
Ball possession	64%	36%
Corner kicks	4	3
Fouls committed	8	10
Offsides	7	2
Yellow cards	2	1
Red cards	0	0

== Aftermath ==
England midfielder Keira Walsh was named official player of the match, with teammate Lucy Bronze voted by fans as England's player of the match. Brazil's Geyse was highlighted for her constant attacking threat throughout the match; coach Pia Sundhage praised Geyse's contribution and credited her move to Barcelona the previous summer for her form. After the match, pundits on British show Football Focus suggested that Walsh and Bronze also joining Barcelona at the same time had similarly improved their form, while giving the same assessment to Georgia Stanway and her move to Bayern Munich.

England's unbeaten run before the match included several encounters that were deemed not challenging enough for the team to prepare for the 2023 FIFA Women's World Cup set to take place in July and August 2023; sports media agreed that while England had looked equally dominant in the first half of the Finalissima, the threat of Brazil in the second half was "the test England needed". The experience of the penalty shoot-out in front of such a large crowd was also considered beneficial for the teams.

Both teams played international fixtures again five days later on 11 April 2023. England would go on to lose 2–0 to Australia in Brentford, their first defeat under manager Sarina Wiegman and ending a 30-match unbeaten run that started in September 2021. Meanwhile, Brazil would beat Germany 2–1 in Nuremberg.
