= Lauren James =

English footballer (born 2001)

Lauren James MBE
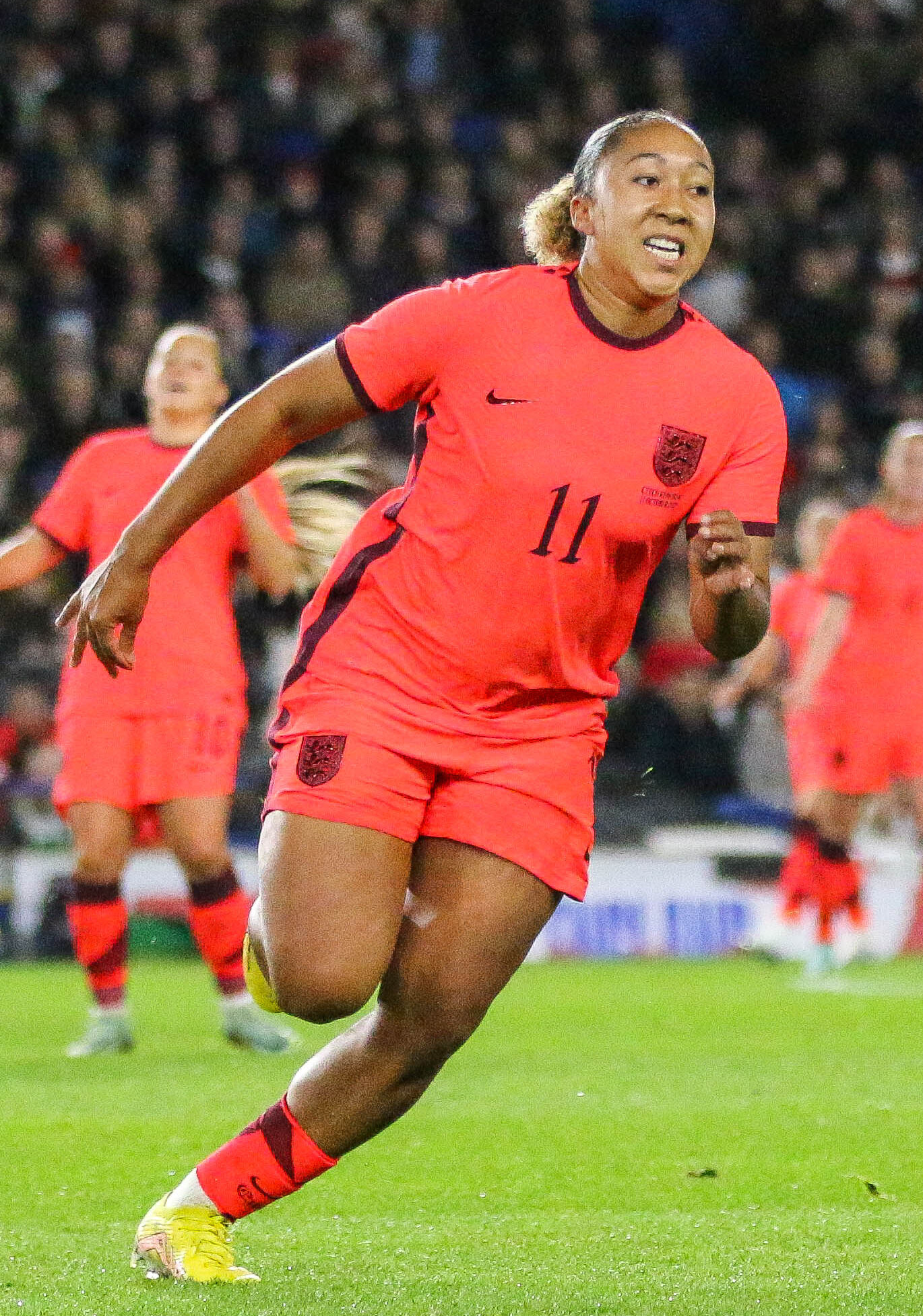
- James with England in 2022

Personal information
- Full name: Lauren Elizabeth James
- Date of birth: 29 September 2001 (age 25)
- Place of birth: London, England
- Height: 5 ft 6 in (1.67 m)
- Positions: Winger; attacking midfielder

Team information
- Current team: Chelsea
- Number: 10

Youth career
- 2010–2014: Chelsea
- 2014–2017: Arsenal

Senior career*
Years	Team	Apps	(Gls)
2017–2018	Arsenal	5	(0)
2018–2021	Manchester United	40	(22)
2021–	Chelsea	68	(31)

International career^{‡}
2017–2018	England U17	6	(6)
2019	England U19	11	(1)
2022–	England	42	(11)
Medal record
Women's football
Representing England
UEFA Women's Championship
Winner	2025 Switzerland
UEFA–CONMEBOL Finalissima
Winner	2023 England
FIFA Women's World Cup
Runner-up	2023 Australia and New Zealand
- * Club domestic league appearances and goals as of 22:05, 1 November 2026 (UTC) ‡ National team caps and goals as of 22:00, 13 October 2026 (UTC)

Lauren Elizabeth James MBE (born 29 September 2001) is an English professional footballer who plays as a winger or attacking midfielder for Women's Super League club Chelsea and the England national team. James started her senior career with Arsenal in 2017 before joining Manchester United in 2018 and winning the Championship. Since joining Chelsea in 2021, she has won four WSL titles and two FA Cups with the club, and was awarded the PFA Women's Young Player of the Year for the 2022–23 season.

James represented England at U17 and U19 level, making her first senior appearance in the 2023 World Cup qualification. She scored her first international goal in the 2023 Arnold Clark Cup against South Korea, followed by her first World Cup goal in the 2023 competition against Denmark, scoring further goals against China. In December 2023, James scored her first Nations League goal against Scotland. James was part of the England squad which won the UEFA Euro 2025.

== Early life ==
Lauren Elizabeth James was born on 29 September 2001 in London. She is of Grenadian and Dominican descent through her father, and English descent through her mother. Her brother Reece James is also a professional footballer. She attended Twickenham Academy in Whitton, London.

== Club career ==
=== Arsenal ===
James was scouted by Arsenal as a 13-year-old and trained with the boys' team, but within two years she began training with the first team. On 29 October 2017, James became the second-youngest player in Arsenal's history to make their debut, coming on in the 67th minute to replace Lisa Evans in a 2–0 win over Everton in the 2017–18 season.

=== Manchester United ===
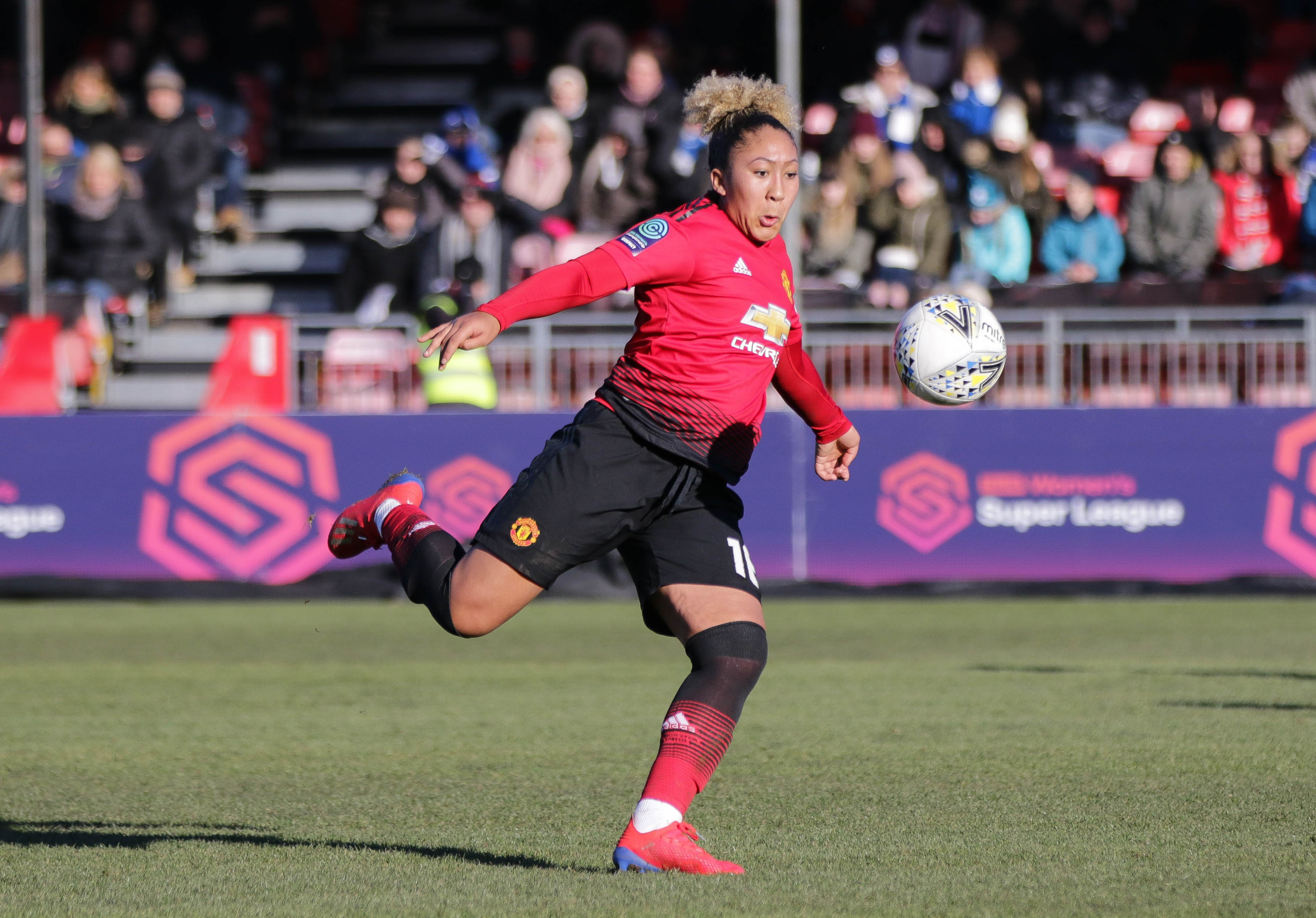
James playing for Manchester United against Brighton & Hove Albion in 2019.

On 13 July 2018, it was announced that James would be part of the first professional Manchester United squad due to compete in the newly restructured 2018–19 FA Women's Championship. She made her competitive debut for Manchester United in a 1–0 League Cup victory against Liverpool, on 19 August. She scored the opening two goals in United's first game of the 2018–19 season, a 12–0 win away to Aston Villa. James was voted FA Women's Championship player of the month for September following her three goals across Manchester United's unbeaten opening month. On 20 April 2019, James scored four goals in a 7–0 league win against Crystal Palace.

James scored United's first ever WSL goal, netting in the 71st minute in a 2–0 win against Liverpool on 28 September 2019. Two weeks later, James was sent off in United's 3–0 league win away to Tottenham Hotspur after receiving two yellow cards. James signed her first professional contract with the club on 16 December. At the end of the 2019–20 season, James finished as United's top scorer and was named to the four player shortlist for PFA Women's Young Player of the Year. On 27 March 2021, James opened the scoring in a 2–0 league victory over West Ham United. The match was the first FA WSL match to be played at Old Trafford.

=== Chelsea ===
On 23 July 2021, James signed a four-year contract with Chelsea. She scored her first goal for the club in a 9–0 away win against Leicester City on 27 March 2022. In her second season at Chelsea, James made 33 appearances in all competitions, scoring 8 goals, including 5 in the WSL. Her performances in the 2022–23 season won her the Young Player Of The Year Award at the Women's Football Awards as well as the PFA Women's Young Player of the Year Award. In June 2023, it was announced that James had signed a contract to remain at Chelsea until 2027.

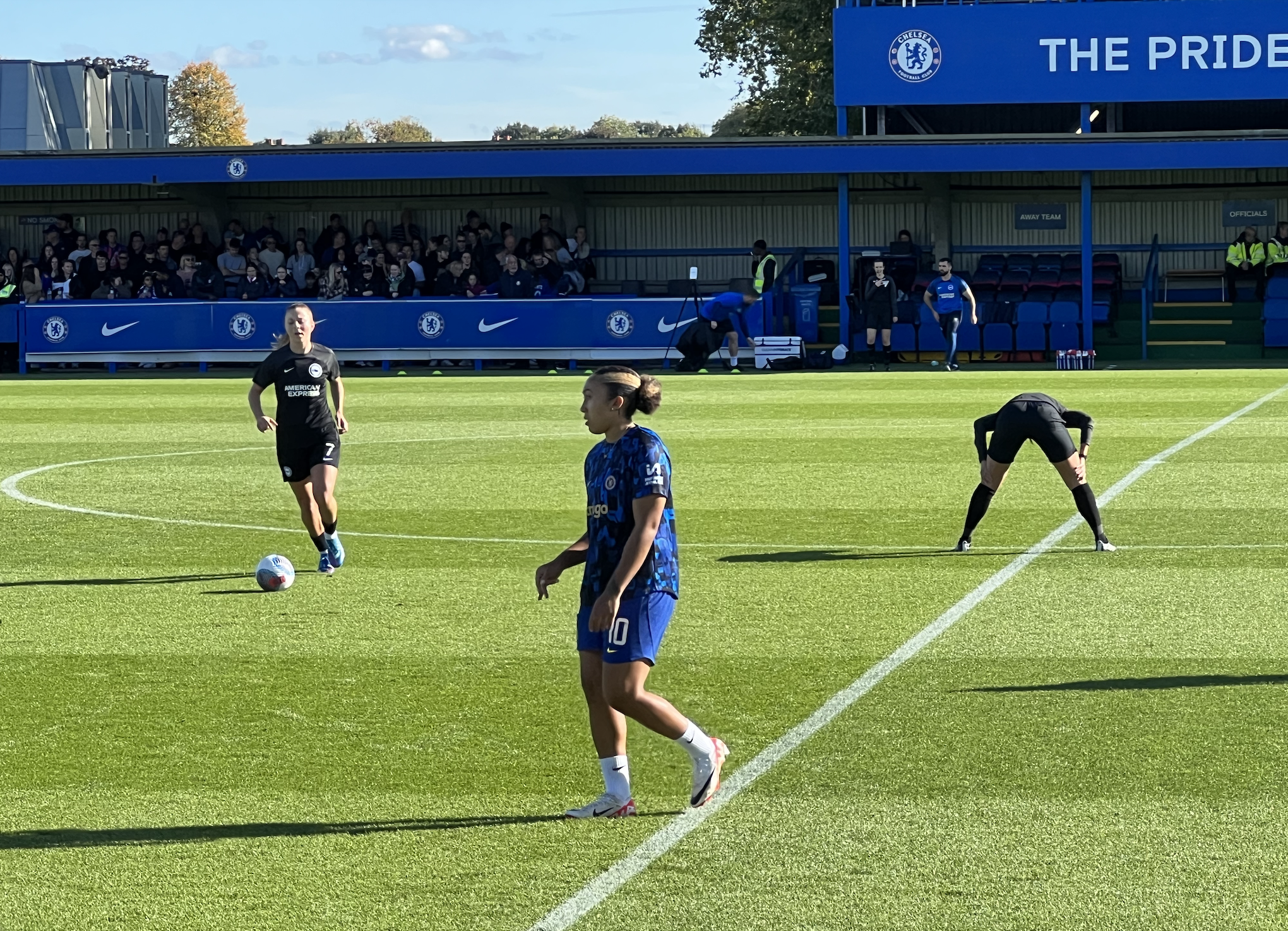
Lauren James warming up with Chelsea on 22 October 2023.

On 18 November 2023, James scored her first WSL hat-trick in a 5–1 home win against Liverpool in the 2023–24 season, and was awarded WSL Player of the Month for November. On 10 December 2023, in the 1–4 away loss against Arsenal, James was yellow carded for an apparent stamp on Lia Wälti after play had been stopped, a second stamping controversy in six months. After the incident, Chelsea manager Emma Hayes said that James was "not in a good place" as James had received "abuse" from the public and the media. In the first league game of the 2024 calendar year, James scored a hat-trick in the 3–1 win against Manchester United, her second consecutive hat-trick at Stamford Bridge. On 27 January 2024, with two goals against Brighton & Hove Albion, James became the joint-top scorer of the WSL with 12 goals in 11 games, alongside Manchester City’s Khadija Shaw. Brighton manager Melissa Phillips described James as "performing at the top of her game right now". In the 2023–24 FA League Cup semifinal, James scored in the 1–0 victory against Manchester City. James was named Chelsea Women's Player of the Year for the 2023–24 season.

James's first goal of the 2024–25 season came in the 58th minute of Chelsea’s 7–0 win against Crystal Palace. In September 2024, Lauren launched a scholarship programme in a bid to improve diversity in women’s football. The scholarship programme is to help young girls from minority backgrounds navigate the early stages of their football careers. James suffered a calf injury prior to Chelsea’s Champions League match against FC Twente. After originally hoping to be back before the end of 2024, manager Sonia Bompastor said she was unlikely to return before 2025. On 16 February 2025 in the home match against Everton, James scored the winner in the 93rd minute, giving Chelsea a 2–1 victory.

On 13 March, 2026, it was announced that she had signed a new contract to extend her time with Chelsea to 2030. She scored the first goal in Chelsea's 2–0 victory over Manchester United in the 2025–26 Women's League Cup final on 15 March 2026.

== International career ==
=== Youth ===
In April 2017, James made her under-17 debut in a 2–0 friendly defeat to USA. On 14 October 2017, she captained England during a 10–0 win over Latvia as part of 2018 UEFA Under-17 Championship qualification, scoring four goals. On 17 October, she scored a further two goals against Slovakia in a 6–0 victory, helping the team to qualify for the final tournament, where England finished in fourth place.

In January 2019, James received her first call-up to the under-19 squad for the Algarve Tournament. In July 2019, James was named in the England squad for the 2019 UEFA Under-19 Championship in Scotland, and played in group stage matches against Germany, Spain, and Belgium.

=== Senior ===
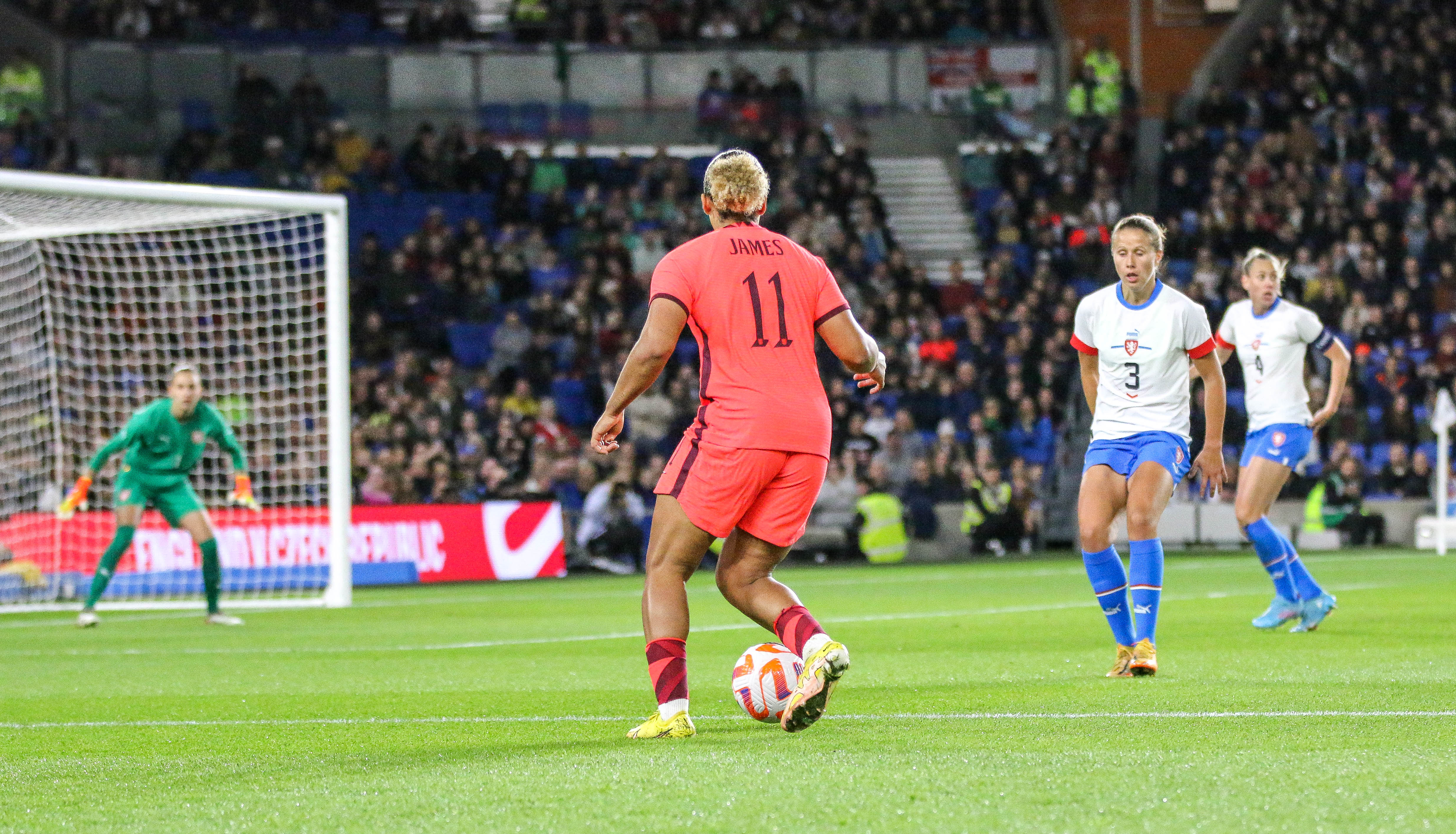
James against the Czech national team on 11 October 2022

In November 2020, James received her first senior national team call-up as part of a 29-player training camp at St George's Park.

James made her senior debut on 3 September 2022, coming on as a 79th minute substitute during England's 2023 World Cup qualification match against Austria.

She scored her first international goal on 16 February 2023 during England's 4–0 victory against South Korea in the 2023 Arnold Clark Cup. She was named player of the tournament.

On 31 May 2023, James was named to the squad for the 2023 World Cup in July 2023. At 21, she was the second youngest player in the squad after the 20 year old Katie Robinson. She scored the only goal in England's 1–0 victory over Denmark in their second Group D fixture, followed by two goals, three assists, and a player of the match performance against China in their final group game. In the first game of the knock-out phase, against Nigeria on 7 August 2023, James was sent off and banned for two games for stamping on the back of Nigerian defender Michelle Alozie, officially qualified as "violent conduct". England went on to win on penalties in her absence. England progressed to the 2023 FIFA World Cup Final, where James was eligible to play again; she came on as a substitute for the second half of the match, as England lost 1–0 to Spain and finished as runners-up in the tournament.

Despite not having featured for club or country since suffering a hamstring injury while with England in April 2025, James was named in the squad for UEFA Euro 2025 on 6 June, with Sarina Wiegman expressing hope that she would be ready for the first game of the tournament on 5 July. The forward scored twice in the 4–0 victory against Netherlands. Despite injury concerns, on 27 July, James started in the tournament's final, helping England to a 1–1 (3–1 on penalties) win over Spain.

== Personal life ==
Lauren has an older brother Reece who captains Chelsea and plays for them and England. They are the first brother and sister to represent England at senior level in the modern era.

She has cited her father Nigel, a UEFA licensed football coach, as inspiration: "[He] has helped me every step of the way. I grew up playing football with my brothers and wanted to play like them; I have always loved the game. I am grateful to my Dad for all the time, effort and love that he has put into my football by coaching me in order that I reach the very best level."

== Career statistics ==
=== Club ===
As of match played 1 November 2026

Appearances and goals by club, season and competition
Club	Season	League			FA Cup		League Cup		Europe		Total	
Club	Season	Division	Apps	Goals	Apps	Goals	Apps	Goals	Apps	Goals	Apps	Goals
Arsenal	2017–18	WSL 1	5	0	0	0	3	1	—		8	1
Manchester United	2018–19	Championship	18	14	3	2	6	1	—		27	17
Manchester United	2019–20	WSL	12	6	1	1	5	2	—		18	9
Manchester United	2020–21	WSL	10	2	0	0	1	0	—		11	2
Manchester United	Total		40	22	4	3	12	3	—		56	28
Chelsea	2021–22	WSL	6	1	3	0	2	0	1 (Note: Appearance(s) in UEFA Women's Champions League)	0	12	1
Chelsea	2022–23	WSL	18	5	4	0	3	1	8	2	33	8
Chelsea	2023–24	WSL	16	13	3	1	2	1	8	1	29	16
Chelsea	2024–25	WSL	9	3	3	1	2	0	3	0	17	4
Chelsea	2025–26	WSL	14	5	4	0	3	1	4	1	25	7
Chelsea	2026–27	WSL	5	4	0	0	—		4	1	9	5
Chelsea	Total		68	31	17	2	12	3	28	5	125	41
Career total			113	53	21	5	27	7	28	5	189	70

=== International ===
As of match played 13 October 2026

Appearances and goals by national team and year
National team	Year	Apps	Goals
England	2022	5	0
England	2023	15	6
England	2024	4	1
England	2025	10	2
England	2026	8	2
Total		42	11

Scores and results list England's goal tally first, score column indicates score after each James goal.

List of international goals scored by Lauren James
No.	Date	Cap	Venue	Opponent	Score	Result	Competition	Ref.
1	16 February 2023	6	Stadium MK, Milton Keynes, England	South Korea	4–0	4–0	2023 Arnold Clark Cup	
2	28 July 2023	13	Sydney Football Stadium, Sydney, Australia	Denmark	1–0	1–0	2023 FIFA Women's World Cup	
3	1 August 2023	14	Hindmarsh Stadium, Adelaide, Australia	China	3–0	6–1	2023 FIFA Women's World Cup	
4	1 August 2023	14	Hindmarsh Stadium, Adelaide, Australia	China	4–1	6–1	2023 FIFA Women's World Cup	
5	5 December 2023	20	Hampden Park, Glasgow, Scotland	Scotland	2–0	6–0	2023–24 UEFA Women's Nations League A	
6	5 December 2023	20	Hampden Park, Glasgow, Scotland	Scotland	3–0	6–0	2023–24 UEFA Women's Nations League A	
7	9 April 2024	24	Aviva Stadium, Dublin, Republic of Ireland	Republic of Ireland	1–0	2–0	UEFA Women's Euro 2025 qualification	
8	9 July 2025	30	Stadion Letzigrund, Zurich, Switzerland	Netherlands	1–0	4–0	UEFA Women's Euro 2025	
9	9 July 2025	30	Stadion Letzigrund, Zurich, Switzerland	Netherlands	3–0	4–0	UEFA Women's Euro 2025	
10	13 October 2026	42	King Power Stadium, Leicester, England	Greece	2–0	5–0	2027 FIFA Women's World Cup qualification play-offs	
11	13 October 2026	42	King Power Stadium, Leicester, England	Greece	4–0	5–0	2027 FIFA Women's World Cup qualification play-offs	

== Honours ==
Arsenal

- FA Women's League Cup: 2017–18

Manchester United

- FA Women's Championship: 2018–19

Chelsea

- FA Women's Super League: 2021–22, 2022–23, 2023–24, 2024–25
- Women's FA Cup: 2021–22, 2022–23, 2024–25
- FA Women's League Cup: 2024–25, 2025–26

England

- FIFA Women's World Cup runner-up: 2023
- UEFA Women's Championship: 2025
- Women's Finalissima: 2023
- Arnold Clark Cup: 2023

Individual

- FA Women's Championship Player of the Month: September 2018
- North-West Football Awards Women's Rising Star: 2020
- WSL Goal of the Month: February 2023
- WSL Player of the Month: November 2023, January 2024
- Arnold Clark Cup Player of the Tournament: 2023
- Arnold Clark Cup NXGN Player of the Tournament: 2023
- London Football Awards Women’s Young Player of the Year: 2023
- Women's Football Awards Young Player of the Year: 2023
- PFA Women's Young Player of the Year: 2022–23
- PFA WSL Team of the Year: 2023–24, 2025–26
- FIFA FIFPRO Women's World 11: 2023, 2024
- Chelsea Women's Player of the Year: 2023–24
