= Landover =

Landover can refer to:

- Landover, Maryland, United States
- Landover Hills, Maryland, United States
  - Landover (Washington Metro), transit station there
- Magic Kingdom of Landover, the fictional setting by Terry Brooks
- Landover Baptist Church, fictional church
- The World Professional Figure Skating Championships, colloquially referred to as "Landover", where they were held annually from 1973 to 1997
