= 2022 Arnold Clark Cup =

Tournament details
- Host country: England
- Dates: 17–23 February
- Teams: 4 (from 2 confederations)
- Venue(s): 3 (in 3 host cities)

Final positions
- Champions: England (1st title)
- Runners-up: Spain
- Third place: Canada
- Fourth place: Germany

Tournament statistics
- Matches played: 6
- Goals scored: 10 (1.67 per match)
- Attendance: 38,761 (6,460 per match)
- Top scorer(s): (England) Millie Bright (Spain) Alexia Putellas (2 goals)
- Best player(s): (Spain) Athenea del Castillo

The 2022 Arnold Clark Cup was the first edition of the Arnold Clark Cup, an invitational women's association football tournament hosted by The Football Association, held from 17 to 23 February 2022.

== Format ==
The four invited teams played each other once in a round-robin tournament. Points awarded in the group stage follow the formula of three points for a win, one point for a draw, and zero points for a loss.

== Venues ==
Several fixtures were originally planned to be scheduled as double-headers with shared ticketing, but plans were scrapped due to COVID-19 restrictions. As a result, matches that did not feature England had low attendances, including 249 spectators at the opening match between Germany and Spain.

| Middlesbrough | Norwich | Wolverhampton |
|---|---|---|
| Riverside Stadium | Carrow Road | Molineux Stadium |
| Capacity: 34,742 | Capacity: 27,359 | Capacity: 32,050 |
2022 Arnold Clark Cup is located in England

== Teams ==
| Team | FIFA Rankings (December 2021) |
|---|---|
| Germany | 3 |
| Canada | 6 |
| England | 8 |
| Spain | 9 |

== Squads ==
The four national teams involved in the tournament could register a maximum of 25 players, which Canada and Germany did, while England registered a 24-player squad and Spain registered a 23-player squad.

== Standings ==
| Pos | Team | Pld | W | D | L | GF | GA | GD | Pts |
|---|---|---|---|---|---|---|---|---|---|
| 1 | England (H, C) | 3 | 1 | 2 | 0 | 4 | 2 | +2 | 5 |
| 2 | Spain | 3 | 1 | 2 | 0 | 2 | 1 | +1 | 5 |
| 3 | Canada | 3 | 1 | 1 | 1 | 2 | 2 | 0 | 4 |
| 4 | Germany | 3 | 0 | 1 | 2 | 2 | 5 | −3 | 1 |

Source: BBC
Rules for classification: 1) points; 2) goal difference; 3) goals scored; 4) head-to-head result; 5) fair play ranking.
(C) Champions; (H) Hosts

== Results ==
All times are local (UTC±0)

17 February 2022
14:30

| Germany | 1–1 | Spain |
|---|---|---|
| Schüller 88' | Report | Putellas 46' |

Riverside Stadium, Middlesbrough
Attendance: 249
Referee: Tess Olofsson (Sweden)
17 February 2022
19:30

| England | 1–1 | Canada |
|---|---|---|
| Bright 22' | Report | Beckie 55' |

Riverside Stadium, Middlesbrough
Attendance: 8,769
Referee: Lina Lehtovaara (Finland)

20 February 2022
15:15

| England | 0–0 | Spain |
|---|---|---|
| | Report |

Carrow Road, Norwich
Attendance: 14,284
Referee: Iuliana Demetrescu (Romania)
20 February 2022
20:15

| Canada | 1–0 | Germany |
|---|---|---|
| Gilles 7' | Report |

Carrow Road, Norwich
Attendance: 119
Referee: Emikar Caldera (Venezuela)

23 February 2022
14:30

| Spain | 1–0 | Canada |
|---|---|---|
| Putellas 21' | Report |

Molineux Stadium, Wolverhampton
Attendance: 877
Referee: Cheryl Foster (Wales)
23 February 2022
19:30

| England | 3–1 | Germany |
|---|---|---|
| White 15'; Bright 84'; Kirby 90+4' | Report | Magull 41' |

Molineux Stadium, Wolverhampton
Attendance: 14,463
Referee: Emikar Caldera (Venezuela)

== Goalscorers ==
There were 10 goals scored in 6 matches, for an average of 1.67 goals per match.

2 goals

- (England) Millie Bright
- (Spain) Alexia Putellas

1 goal

- (Canada) Janine Beckie
- (Canada) Vanessa Gilles
- (England) Fran Kirby
- (England) Ellen White
- (Germany) Lina Magull
- (Germany) Lea Schüller
