= 2023 Arnold Clark Cup =

Tournament details
- Host country: England
- Dates: 16–22 February
- Teams: 4 (from 2 confederations)
- Venues: 3 (in 3 host cities)

Final positions
- Champions: England (2nd title)
- Runners-up: Belgium
- Third place: Italy
- Fourth place: South Korea

Tournament statistics
- Matches played: 6
- Goals scored: 23 (3.83 per match)
- Attendance: 100,522 (16,754 per match)
- Top scorer: (England) Chloe Kelly (3 goals)
- Best player: (England) Lauren James

The 2023 Arnold Clark Cup was the second edition of the Arnold Clark Cup, an invitational women's association football tournament hosted by The Football Association, held from 16 to 22 February 2023.

England won the tournament for the second time with three wins from three games.

== Format ==
The four invited teams played each other once in a round-robin tournament. Points awarded in the group stage followed the formula of three points for a win, one point for a draw, and zero points for a loss.

== Venues ==
Matches were played as double-headers at three venues across England.

Milton Keynes	Bristol	Coventry
Stadium MK	Ashton Gate	Coventry Building Society Arena
Capacity: 30,500	Capacity: 27,000	Capacity: 32,753
2023 Arnold Clark Cup is located in England

== Teams ==
Team	FIFA Rankings (December 2022)
England	4
South Korea	15
Italy	17
Belgium	20

== Standings ==
Pos	Team	Pld	W	D	L	GF	GA	GD	Pts
1	England (H, C)	3	3	0	0	12	2	+10	9
2	Belgium	3	2	0	1	5	8	−3	6
3	Italy	3	1	0	2	4	5	−1	3
4	South Korea	3	0	0	3	2	8	−6	0

Source: BBC
Rules for classification: 1) points; 2) goal difference; 3) goals scored; 4) head-to-head result; 5) fair play ranking.
(C) Champions; (H) Hosts

== Results ==
All times are local (UTC±0)

16 February 2023
16:45

Italy	1–2	Belgium
Giugliano 64'	Report	Detruyer 16'; Wullaert 90'

Stadium MK, Milton Keynes
Attendance: 8,705
Referee: Ewa Augustyn (Poland)
16 February 2023
19:45

England	4–0	South Korea
Stanway 40' (pen.); Kelly 46'; Russo 50'; James 78'	Report

Stadium MK, Milton Keynes
Attendance: 21,013
Referee: Andreza de Siqueira (Brazil)

19 February 2023
15:15

England	2–1	Italy
Daly 32', 71'	Report	Cantore 62'

Coventry Building Society Arena, Coventry
Attendance: 32,128
Referee: Ivana Projkovska (North Macedonia)
19 February 2023
18:15

Belgium	2–1	South Korea
Wullaert 45+1'; De Caigny 68'	Report	Lee Geum-min 10'

Coventry Building Society Arena, Coventry
Attendance: 5,609
Referee: Frida Nielsen (Denmark)

22 February 2023
16:45

South Korea	1–2	Italy
Ji So-yun 69'	Report	Caruso 6'; Rosucci 90+5'

Ashton Gate, Bristol
Attendance: 6,938
Referee: Andreza de Siqueira (Brazil)
22 February 2023
19:45

England	6–1	Belgium
Kelly 12', 50'; Williamson 42', 90+3'; Biesmans 78' (o.g.); Bronze 89'	Report	Dhont 90+1'

Ashton Gate, Bristol
Attendance: 26,129
Referee: Jelena Cvetković (Serbia)

== Goalscorers ==
There were 23 goals scored in 6 matches, for an average of 3.83 goals per match.

3 goals

- (England) Chloe Kelly

2 goals

- (Belgium) Tessa Wullaert
- (England) Rachel Daly
- (England) Leah Williamson

1 goal

- (Belgium) Tine De Caigny
- (Belgium) Marie Detruyer
- (Belgium) Elena Dhont
- (England) Lucy Bronze
- (England) Lauren James
- (England) Alessia Russo
- (England) Georgia Stanway
- (Italy) Sofia Cantore
- (Italy) Arianna Caruso
- (Italy) Manuela Giugliano
- (Italy) Martina Rosucci
- (South Korea) Ji So-yun
- (South Korea) Lee Geum-min

1 own goal

- (Belgium) Julie Biesmans (against England)
