= Women's Finalissima =

Intercontinental football match

- Organiser(s): CONMEBOL; UEFA
- Founded: 2023; 3 years ago
- Region: South America; Europe
- Teams: 2
- Current champions: England (1st title)
- Most championships: England (1 title)
- Website: uefa.com/womensfinalissima
- 2026 Women's Finalissima

The Women's Finalissima is an intercontinental women's football super cup organised by CONMEBOL and UEFA and contested by the winners of the Copa América Femenina and UEFA Women's Championship. Played as a quadrennial one-off match, the first match was played a year after the revival of the men's competition in 2022 following the signing of a memorandum of understanding between CONMEBOL and UEFA.

== History ==
On 12 February 2020, UEFA and CONMEBOL signed a renewed memorandum of understanding meant to enhance cooperation between the two organisations. As part of the agreement, a joint UEFA–CONMEBOL committee examined the possibility of staging European–South American intercontinental matches, for both women's and men's football and across various age groups. On 15 December 2021, UEFA and CONMEBOL again signed a renewed memorandum of understanding lasting until 2028, which included specific provisions on opening a joint office in London and the potential organisation of various football events.

On 2 June 2022, the day after staging the 2022 Finalissima, CONMEBOL and UEFA announced a series of new events between teams from the two confederations. This included a match between the winners of South America's Copa América Femenina and the winners of Europe's UEFA Women's Championship. The first edition took place on 6 April 2023 at Wembley Stadium in London, England, between Brazil, winners of the 2022 Copa América Femenina, and England, winners of UEFA Women's Euro 2022. The inaugural edition was won by England on penalties following a 1–1 draw after regular time (the new competition does not have extra time: ties go straight to a penalty shootout).

The second Women's Finalissima was expected to take place in 2026 and be between the same teams, following both England and Brazil retaining their continental trophies at the UEFA Women's Euro 2025 and 2025 Copa América Femenina. Although Brazil's national federation had in 2025 scheduled the game for the March 2026 international window, with FIFA allowing teams to play three games instead of two, England announced they would only play two games (their 2027 FIFA Women's World Cup qualifiers) to reduce fixture congestion. England's World Cup qualifiers ultimately took up their entire schedule for 2026.

== Results ==
List of Women's Finalissima matches
Year	Winners	Score	Runners-up	Venue	Location	Attendance
2023	England	1–1 (4–2 p)	Brazil	Wembley Stadium	London, England	83,132
2027				Maracanã Stadium	Rio de Janeiro, Brazil	

== Performances ==
=== By nation ===
Results by nation
Team	Winners	Runners-up
England	1 (2023)	—
Brazil	—	1 (2023)

=== By confederation ===
Results by confederation
Confederation	Winners	Runners-up
UEFA	1	0
CONMEBOL	0	1

== Other matches between champions ==
List of matches between the CONMEBOL and UEFA champions
Year	Competition	Round	CONMEBOL champion	Score	UEFA champion	Venue	Location
(China) 1988	International Tournament	Group stage	Brazil	2–1	Norway	Jiangmen Stadium	Jiangmen
(China) 1988	International Tournament	Semi-final	Brazil	1–2	Norway	Tianhe Stadium	Guangzhou
(Sweden) 1995	World Cup	Group stage	Brazil	1–6	Germany	Tingvalla IP	Karlstad
(United States) 1999	World Cup	Group stage	Brazil	3–3	Germany	Jack Kent Cooke Stadium	Landover
(Australia) 2000	Olympics Game	Group stage	Brazil	1–2	Germany	Bruce Stadium	Canberra
(Australia) 2000	Olympics Game	Bronze match	Brazil	0–2	Germany	Sydney Football Stadium	Sydney
(China) 2007	World Cup	Group stage	Argentina	0–11	Germany	Hongkou Football Stadium	Shanghai
(Portugal) 2015	Algarve Cup	Group stage	Brazil	1–3	Germany	Stadium Bela Vista	Parchal
(Germany) 2015	Friendly	N/A	Brazil	0–4	Germany	Stadion am Laubenweg	Fürth
(Germany) 2017	Friendly	N/A	Brazil	1–3	Germany	Hardtwaldstadion	Sandhausen
(France) 2020	Tournoi de France		Brazil	0–0	Netherlands	Stade du Hainaut	Valenciennes
(Japan) 2021	Olympics Game	Group stage	Brazil	3–3	Netherlands	Miyagi Stadium	Rifu
(France) 2022	Tournoi de France		Brazil	1–1	Netherlands	Stade Michel d'Ornano	Caen
(England) 2025	Friendly	N/A	Brazil	2–1	England	City of Manchester Stadium	Manchester

== See also ==
- UEFA–CONMEBOL MoU
  - Finalissima
  - Women's Finalissima
  - Futsal Finalissima
  - UEFA–CONMEBOL Club Challenge
  - Under-20 Intercontinental Cup
