= Arnold Clark Cup =

- Organiser(s): The Football Association
- Founded: 2022; 4 years ago
- Abolished: 2023; 3 years ago
- Region: England
- Teams: 4
- Last champions: England (2nd title)
- Most championships: England (2 titles)
- Website: arnoldclarkcup.com

The Arnold Clark Cup was an invitational women's association football tournament hosted by the Football Association in England, held in 2022 and 2023. It was named after car retailer Arnold Clark, who signed a multi-year sponsorship deal. ITV acted as the competition's domestic broadcast partner.

Played during the February/March international break, the Arnold Clark Cup took place at the same time as other notable international women's invitational tournaments such as the Algarve Cup, the Cup of Nations, the Cyprus Women's Cup, the Istria Cup, the Pinatar Cup, the SheBelieves Cup, the Tournoi de France, the Turkish Women's Cup and the Women's Revelations Cup.

England won both editions of the tournament. It has not been held since the introduction of the UEFA Women's Nations League and its link with the UEFA Women's Championship and FIFA Women's World Cup qualifiers.

== Format ==
The four invited teams play each other once in a round-robin tournament. Points awarded in the group stage follow the formula of three points for a win, one point for a draw, and zero points for a loss. A tie in points would be decided by goal difference.

== Results ==
Year	Host cities	Winner	Runner-up	Third place	Fourth place
2022	Middlesbrough, Norwich and Wolverhampton	England	Spain	Canada	Germany
2023	Bristol, Coventry and Milton Keynes	England	Belgium	Italy	South Korea

== Participating nations ==
Team	2022	2023	Years
Belgium	–	2nd	1
Canada	3rd	–	1
England	1st	1st	2
Germany	4th	–	1
Italy	–	3rd	1
South Korea	–	4th	1
Spain	2nd	–	1
Total	4	4	
