= Women's Football Awards =

Annual awards

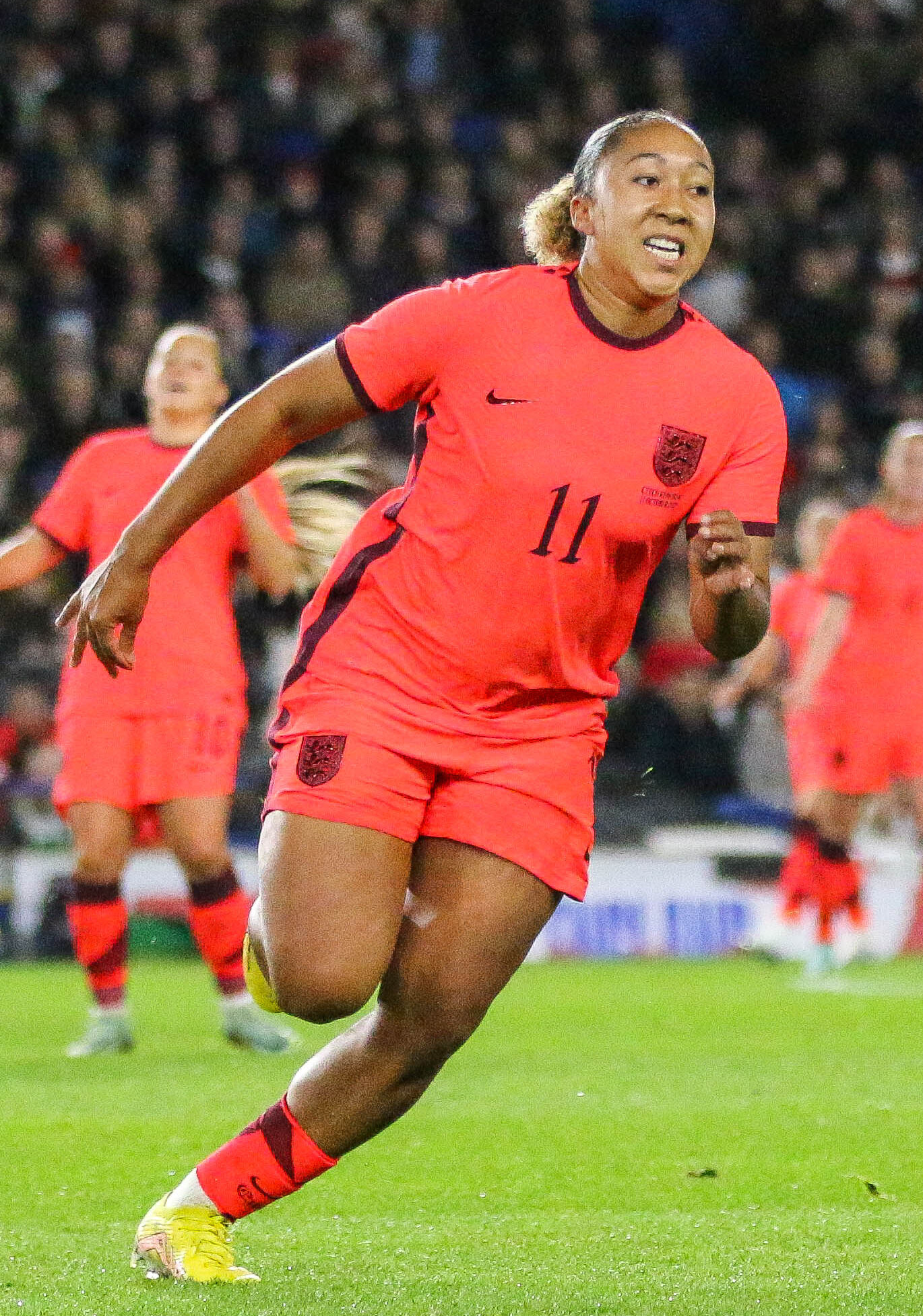
Lauren James was co-winner of Player of the Year in 2025, when her club Chelsea also won Club of the Year, Manager of the Year and Young Player of the Year

The Women's Football Awards are awards recognising achievements in women's association football — both on-pitch performance and in promotion and sustainability — predominantly in the United Kingdom. Annual awards, they were first presented in 2023.

== History ==
The Women's Football Awards was announced in 2022 and was promoted as the first major awards event solely for women's football. Awards are presented in various categories relating to success in the game and in supporting its growth. While celebrating achievements globally, the focus of the awards is domestic women's football in the United Kingdom (and, generally, England). Ahead of the second edition, co-host Eni Aluko described the awards as "Britain and Europe's biggest award event for women's football". According to the Women's Football Awards website, the International Player of the Year award is for the best player on the world stage; they are still nominated by club.

Nominations are made by the public, with winners decided by a combination of public and jury votes.

Per Beth Mead, who supported the awards, they intend to "shine a light on the success in the game and the people, brands and organisations which support its growth". As of 2024, the awards are run in association with TikTok and Metro.

== Winners and nominees ==
=== 2023 ===
The ceremony for the inaugural edition was held at the Nobu Hotel in London on 25 May 2023, hosted by former footballers and pundits Eni Aluko and Jamie Carragher. The major sponsor was Shein, which supported grassroots nominees to attend the ceremony. Entertainment was provided by Heather Small and Fleur East. In 2023, the awards were run in association with Mail Sport and Metro.

- Lifetime Achievement Award: Karen Carney (144 England caps)
- Special Recognition Award: Carol Thomas (England captain at the first Women's Euro)

Player of the Year: Alessia Russo (Manchester United)‡; Millie Bright (Chelsea); Rachel Daly (Aston Villa); Mary Earps (Manchester United); Lauren Hemp (Manchester City); Chloe Kelly (Manchester City); Sam Kerr (Chelsea); Beth Mead (Arsenal); Khadija 'Bunny' Shaw (Manchester City); Leah Williamson (Arsenal)	International Player of the Year: Keira Walsh (Barcelona and England)‡; Lucy Bronze (Barcelona and England); Pernille Harder (Chelsea and Denmark); Marie-Antoinette Katoto (Lyon and France); Vivianne Miedema (Arsenal and Netherlands); Alex Morgan (San Diego Wave and United States); Alexia Putellas (Barcelona); Wendie Renard (Lyon and France); Georgia Stanway (Bayern Munich and England); Caroline Weir (Real Madrid and Scotland)	Young Football Player of the Year: Lauren James (Chelsea)‡; Missy Bo Kearns (Liverpool)‡; Asmita Ale (Tottenham Hotspur); Laura Blindkilde Brown (Aston Villa); Melchie Dumornay (Reims); Mary Fowler (Manchester City); Maya Le Tissier (Manchester United); Jess Park (Everton); Poppy Pattinson (Brighton & Hove Albion); Ebony Salmon (Houston Dash)
Football Ally of the Year: Harry Kane (Tottenham Hotspur)‡; Declan Rice (West Ham United)‡; João Cancelo (Bayern Munich); David de Gea (Manchester United); Jordan Henderson (Liverpool); Rob Holding (Arsenal); Reece James (Chelsea); Harry Maguire (Manchester United); Tyrone Mings (Aston Villa); Kieran Trippier (Newcastle United)	Grassroots Initiative of the Year: Manchester Laces — Inclusive To All‡; Agility Life Sciences – GIFT Grants; Everton – Grassroots Commitment; Inspire Girls Football – IGF College Programme; Miss Kick Foundation – Team Up To Level Up; Sunderland Athletic Football Club – For Our Girls; TGI Fridays – #CelebrateTheGame; Tottenham Hotspur – Female Talent Pathway; West Ham United – Player Development Pathway; Weymouth Women – Grassroots Commitment	Brand of the Year: Adidas – Pitch, Please‡; McDonald's – Fun Football Coaching; MissKick – The Football Clothing Brand for Her; PepsiCo – Women in Football; PlayStation – UEFA Women's Football; Sky Sports – #WhatIf; Starling Bank – Kick on with Starling; Three Mobile – We See You Network; Visa – Team Talks; Vitality – Women's FA Cup
Marketing Campaign of the Year: Visa – When More of Us Play, All of Us Win‡; American Express/Brighton & Hove Albion – Cheer Booth; DAZN – This Is Elite; eBay – eBay Dream Transfer; EE – Hope United; M&C Saatchi – Same City, Same Passion; Nike – Never Seen; Pepsi Max – Get Match Ready; TikTok – Euro2022 – #WomenInSports; Volkswagen – #NotWomensFootball	Women's Football Champion of the Year: Ian Wright‡; Paul Barber; Karen Carney; Leah Case and Eve Ralph; Tracey Crouch MP; Emma Hayes; Phil Neville; Lisa O'Keefe; Hope Powell; Susan Whelan	Women's Football Broadcaster or Journalist of the Year: Rachel O'Sullivan & Sophie Downey (Girls On The Ball)‡; Kate Abdo; Kathryn Batte; Faye Carruthers; Tom Garry; Charlotte Harpur; Jacqui Oatley; Alex Scott; Fara Williams; Laura Woods
Best Club of the Year: Manchester United‡; Arsenal; Aston Villa; Brighton & Hove Albion; Chelsea; Everton; Glasgow Rangers; Leeds United; Manchester City; Southampton	Off The Pitch Award: Fern Whelan‡; Dawn Airey; Vic Akers; Aileen Campbell; Yvonne Harrison; Sian Massey-Ellis; Sam Matterface; Danetta Powell; Sofia Thomas; Rachel Yankey	Equality, Diversity & Inclusion Award: Three Mobile‡; Cinch; Enterprise Rent-A-Car; Heineken; Just Eat; Pepsi; Premier League; Standard Chartered; Starling Bank; Twitter
Outstanding Corporate Social Responsibility Award: Arnold Clark‡; Barclays; Cinch; Clarke Willmott Solicitors; Continental; EA Sports; Euronics; Everton Football Club; Sports Direct; Walkers/Lays	Football Business of the Year: FLOWSPORTS‡; Brabners; CAA Stellar; Evelyn Partners; IDA Sports; Mills & Reeve; Mishcon de Reya; Tongue Tied Management; Triple S Group; Wasserman	

=== 2024 ===
Aluko and Carragher returned as hosts for the ceremony on 30 May 2024, with Shein also returning as sponsor. In this edition, the categories also had a highly commended nominee behind the winner.

As well as the nominated awards, four categories were awarded without having named nominees. The first two were handed out before the nominated categories, and the second two at the end of the ceremony:

- Unsung Hero: Jane Purdon (former director of Women in Football, author)
- Inspirational Role Model: (Note: The category was not announced as an award before the ceremony.) Steph Houghton
- Women's Football Ally: Jermaine Jenas
- Lifetime Achievement Award: Kerry Davis

Football Player of the Year: Bunny Shaw‡; Sam Kerr^{HC}; Millie Bright; Jess Carter; Mary Earps; Lauren James; Frida Maanum; Katie McCabe; Nikita Parris; Guro Reiten	International Football Player of the Year: Georgia Stanway (Bayern Munich)‡; Lucy Bronze (Barcelona)^{HC}; Aitana Bonmatí (Barcelona); Kadidiatou Diani (Lyon); Jenni Hermoso (Tigres); Lena Oberdorf (Wolfsburg); Ewa Pajor (Wolfsburg); Salma Paralluelo (Barcelona); Wendie Renard (Lyon); Fridolina Rolfö (Barcelona)	Young Football Player of the Year: Maya Le Tissier (Manchester United)‡; Laura Blindkilde Brown (Aston Villa)^{HC}; Aggie Beever-Jones (Chelsea); Grace Clinton (Manchester United); Kyra Cooney-Cross (Arsenal); Mary Fowler (Manchester City); Khiara Keating (Manchester City); Naomi Layzell (Bristol City); Jessica Naz (Tottenham Hotspur); Elisabeth Terland (Brighton & Hove Albion)
2023 World Cup Hero: Mary Earps (England)‡; Aitana Bonmatí (Spain)^{HC}; Millie Bright (England); Linda Caicedo (Colombia); Olga Carmona (Spain); Steph Catley (Australia); Yui Hasegawa (Japan); Lauren Hemp (England); Amanda Ilestedt (Sweden); Jill Roord (Netherlands)	Best Club of the Year: Chelsea‡; Brighton & Hove Albion^{HC}; Arsenal; Lewes; Liverpool; Manchester City; Manchester United; Southampton; Tottenham Hotspur; Wrexham	Manager or Coach of the Year: Sarina Wiegman CBE‡; Emma Hayes OBE^{HC}; Matt Beard; Darren Carter; Steven Dale; Jonas Eidevall; Jo Potter; Leanne Ross; Marc Skinner; Gareth Taylor
Broadcaster or Journalist of the Year: Alex Scott MBE‡; Kate Abdo^{HC}; Rachel Brown-Finnis; Reshmin Chowdhury; Charlotte Harpur; Emma Jones; Lianne Sanderson; Sirayah Shiraz; Lucy Ward; Laura Woods	Grassroots Initiative of the Year: Disney — UEFA Playmakers‡; McDonald's Fun Football Programme‡; Beyond the Ball — Football For Women; Chelsea Foundation — Nothing Stops Us Festival; Fulham F.C. — Sister Club Programme; MSB Woolton FC; Rochdale A.F.C./Keira Walsh — Keira Walsh Rochdale Girls Development Centre; Scottish Power — Scottish Youth Challenge Cup; Starling Bank — Kick On; Weymouth Women	Marketing Campaign of the Year: Gillette/Lotte Wubben-Moy — MoveYourSkin‡; Panini — WSL stickers^{HC}; Asahi — Super Dry 0.0% Partnership; Barclays — Land of Football; Google/Megan Rapinoe — #FixedonPixel; Johnnie Walker — Johnnie Walker & Hannah Waddingham; Pepsi Max — Our Pride Shines Bright; Sky Sports — Keep Up; Sure — Breaking Limits; Visa — Celebrating Squad Goals
Best Social Media Campaign: The FA — Lionesses‡; Adidas — Play Until They Can't Look Away^{HC}; Adobe — Women's FA Cup; Bluebella — Strong is Beautiful; Burnley Football Club — TikTok partnership; Cisco — Helping Women Kick Goals; FIFA — Women's World Cup; Google/The Athletic — My Game in My Words; Heineken — The Social Swap; Unilever/TikTok — Women's World Cup	Best Fan Engagement: Manchester United‡; Brighton & Hove Albion/American Express^{HC}; EAFC24; Expedia/Liverpool Women; GirlsOnTheBall; Hyundai/Common Goal; Just Eat; Transport for London; Versus/Glamour UK; WSL Collective	

Women's Football Champion: Yvonne Harrison‡; Fara Williams MBE^{HC}; Vic Akers OBE; Dame Sarai Bareman; Barbara Charone; Natasha Dowie; Michele Kang; Jacqui Oatley MBE; Alex Scott MBE; Rachel Yankey OBE	Football Business of the Year: EA Sports‡; Wasserman‡; A&V Sports; Arete; CAA Sports; Entain; MatchFit; TNT Sport; Tongue Tied Management; Triple S Sport	Equality, Diversity & Inclusion Award: Tottenham Hotspur — Girls Elite Programme‡; Standard Chartered/Liverpool FC^{HC}; Arnold Clark; Arsenal — South Asian Pathway; Barclays Community Football Fund; eToro/West Ham United; Everton — Equality Shirt; Her Game Too; Hyundai — Goal of the Century; Sky Sports/Women in Football
Outstanding Corporate Social Responsibility Award: Premier League‡; Moore Kingston Smith^{HC}; Cadbury; Euronics; Evelyn Partners; McDonald's; Mills & Reeve; Relo Metrics; Sports Direct; Xero	Best Breakthrough Business: Scottish Power‡; Rept Sports^{HC}; Gravity Media; Il Makiage; Joie; Lawrence Stephens Sports Team; LiveScore; Livida Sport; Sedulo; Skoda	Football Business Trailblazer: Sharon Brittan‡; Anna Deignan^{HC}; Zarah Al-Kudcy; Paul Barber; Karren Brady CBE; Catherine Forshaw; Georgie Hodge; Preeti Shetty; Christina Taylor; Susan Whelan OBE
Off The Pitch Award: Katie Gritt (Panini)‡; Ellie Cross (Starling Bank)^{HC}; Dawn Airey (Barclay's FA WSL and Championship); Donna-Maria Cullen (Tottenham Hotspur); Nikki Doucet (NewCo); Fran Kirby (Chelsea); Laura McAllister (UEFA); Rida Mohammad (MACE Group); Leigh Nicol (Crystal Palace); Lola Ogunbote (Burnley)	Game Changer Award: Victoire Cogevina Reynal‡; Jill Scott MBE^{HC}; Nouhaila Benzina; Gillian Coulthard MBE; Hannah Dingley; Debbie Hewitt; Rafaela Pimenta; Natalie Portman; Kelly Simmons OBE; Rebecca Welch	Brand of the Year: Adidas‡; Barclays^{HC}; Coca-Cola; eToro; Puma; Scottish Power; Starling Bank; Three Mobile; Unilever; Xero

=== 2025 ===
The 2025 ceremony was held on 1 May 2025, hosted by sports broadcaster Gabby Logan as well as the returning Carragher. Aluko had also been set to return as presenter but pulled out the day before the ceremony due to controversy after she criticised pundit Ian Wright, saying she did not want her presence to take attention away from the awards.

Anita Asante, who received the Game Changer award, dedicated her win to transgender footballers after announcements by The Football Association and Scottish Football Association that these players would be banned. She called on current professional players to also show their support for the transgender community.

- Unsung Hero: Fiona McIntyre (managing director of the Scottish Women's Premier League)
- Inspirational Role Model: Keira Walsh (for contributions to the Rochdale A.F.C. Girls' Development Centre)
- Women's Football Icon: Viviane Asseyi
- Lifetime Achievement Award: Kelly Simmons OBE (director of Women in Football)

Football Player of the Year: Alessia Russo‡; Lauren James‡; Jessica Naz; Khadija "Bunny" Shaw; Bethany England; Ella Toone; Frida Maanum; Vivianne Miedema; Guro Reiten; Viviane Asseyi; Mary Fowler; Leah Williamson	International Football Player of the Year: Alexia Putellas (Barcelona)‡; Clara Matéo (Paris FC); Georgia Stanway (Bayern Munich); Linda Caicedo (Real Madrid); Caroline Graham Hansen (Barcelona); Aitana Bonmatí (Barcelona); Kadidiatou Diani (Lyon); Marie-Antoinette Katoto (Paris Saint-Germain); Pernille Harder (Bayern Munich); Christiane Endler (Lyon); Lea Schüller (Bayern Munich); Chiamaka Nnadozie (Paris FC)	Young Football Player of the Year: Aggie Beever-Jones‡; Anouk Denton; Issy Hobson; Michelle Agyemang; Kyra Cooney-Cross; Grace Clinton; Olivia Smith; Laura Blindkilde Brown; Elisabeth Terland; Lenna Gunning-Williams; Missy Goodwin; Katie Robinson
Manager or Coach of the Year: Sonia Bompastor‡; Sarina Wiegman; Amy Merricks; Marc Skinner; Robert Vilahamn; Jocelyn Prêcheur; Nick Cushing; Karen Hills; Dario Vidošić; Jo Potter; Leanne Ross; Grant Scott	Best Club of the Year: Chelsea‡; Brighton & Hove Albion; Arsenal; Liverpool; Glasgow City; Hibernian; Manchester United; Birmingham City; Manchester City; London City Lionesses; Tottenham Hotspur; West Ham	Brand of the Year: Adobe‡; Barclays; Three UK; EA Sports; Holland & Barrett; ScottishPower; Just Eat Takeaway.com; Visa; Adidas; Nike; Unilever (Rexona); Subway
Broadcaster or Journalist of the Year: Seema Jaswal‡; Karen Carney OBE; Rachel Brown-Finnis; Reshmin Chowdhury; Hayley McQueen; Sirayah Shiraz; Laura Woods; Alex Scott MBE; Flo Lloyd-Hughes; Pien Meulensteen; Izzy Christiansen; Charlotte Harpur; Jo Currie	Marketing Campaign of the Year: Persil/Arsenal W.F.C. — Every Stain Should Be Part of the Game‡; The FA — Made For This Game; Three UK — #WeSeeYou Network; Heineken — The Social Swap; Holland & Barrett — The Movement Movement; Women in Sport — #LetHerDream; Adidas — Recreation of 2006 Jose +10 campaign; Adobe — Adobe Gamechangers; Amazon/Adam&Eve DDB — The Grit; M+C Saatchi Sport & Entertainment/Barclays — It All Starts With A Chance; Rexona — Breaking Limits; Visa — Pep Talks	Best Social Media Campaign: The FA — Lionesses‡; Bluebella Lingerie — Strong Is Beautiful; Adobe — Women's FA Cup; Manchester City W.F.C.; Tottenham Hotspur F.C. Women; Heineken — The Social Swap; Chelsea F.C. Women; Bristol City W.F.C.; GirlsontheBall; Diversity Media Sales and Goals 4 Girls — It's Her Game; UEFA — Off Mute; FC Barcelona Femení
	Best Fan Engagement: Brighton & Hove Albion W.F.C.‡; DAZN; Sky Sports; Hibernian W.F.C.; Just Eat Takeaway.com; Manchester United W.F.C.; Liverpool F.C. Women; Panini; Pixel FC Academy; Aston Villa W.F.C.; Chelsea F.C. Women; Birmingham City W.F.C.	

Women's Football Champion: Chloe Morgan‡; Dawn Airey CBE; Nikki Doucet; Ian Wright OBE; Aileen Campbell; Nadine Keßler; Debbie Hewitt MBE; Hannah Brown; Sue Day MBE; Caz May; Ebru Köksal; Victoire Cogevina	Football Business of the Year: REPT Sports‡; Wasserman; CMG Sports; ignite talent; Complete Sports Group; Crux Sports; EMG/Gravity Media; DAZN; CAA Sports; A&V Sports; EA Sports; Tongue Tied Management	Equality, Diversity & Inclusion Award: Sky Sports‡; Tottenham Hotspur F.C. Women‡; Axa; Stanley Black & Decker; Google Pixel; Sport England; Heineken; Evelyn Partners; The FA; Brighton & Hove Albion W.F.C.; Standard Chartered; TNT Sports
Outstanding Corporate Social Responsibility Award: Three UK‡; TGI Fridays; Puma; ScottishPower; Booking.com; Starling Bank; Amazon; Xero; PwC; Deloitte; Trivago; Barclays; Weetabix	Best Breakthrough Business: Victoria's Secret‡; Nutriburst; Foudys; Lidl; Mitre; eToro; Snapdragon; Il Makiage; Havas Play; Garmin; LiveScore; Revolut	Football Business Trailblazer: Anna Deignan‡; Nicole Pacitti; Ellie Cross; Susan Whelan OBE; Susan Black; Marijn Luchtman; Heidi Savitt; Collette Roche; Bex Smith; Michele Kang; Georgie Hodge; Christina Taylor
Off The Pitch Award: Paul Barber OBE‡; Kelly Simmons OBE; Tammy Parlour MBE; Laura Youngson; Gemma Owen; Katy Bowman; Preeti Shetty; Fiona McIntyre; Debbie Hewitt MBE; Charlotte O’Neill; Lola Ogunbote; Carol Couse	Game Changer Award: Anita Asante‡; Fara Williams MBE; Rachel Yankey OBE; Toni Duggan; Gillian Coultard MBE; Eartha Pond; Jill Scott MBE; Shelley Kerr MBE; Kelly Smith MBE; Julie Fleeting MBE; Emma Hayes OBE; Jen Beattie MBE	Grassroots Initiative of the Year: Manchester United Foundation — Girls' Football Development‡; Women's Sport Trust; Girls United FA; Chelsea Foundation — Inspire Her Project; Everton in the Community — Kicks Girls Goals Hour; Premier League Kicks; UEFA Playmakers inspired by Disney; McDonald's Fun Football; Liverpool F.C. Women/Expedia — Free Fan Travel Initiative; Starling Bank — Kick On With Starling; Football Beyond Borders; MSB Woolton FC
	Legal Team of the Year: RPC‡; Brabners; Lawrence Stephens; Livida Sport; Morton Fraser MacRoberts; Norton Rose Fulbright; Mishcon de Reya; Farrer & Co; Mills & Reeve; Bird & Bird; Penningtons Manches Cooper; Brandsmiths	

== Response ==
The awards saw 20,000 public votes in their inaugural edition, increasing to 25,000 in the second year.

=== Male Ally award criticism ===
There was negative reaction to the Football Ally of the Year award, presented in the inaugural edition. Initially, it had been named "Male Football Ally of the Year". Fan responses questioned the need for an award celebrating men, and it was noted that the nominees had done nothing visible for women's football: some had congratulated women's footballers on social media and others had not had any public involvement at all. Harry Kane was one of the recipients, with The Times writing that his contribution of celebrating the Lionesses' UEFA Women's Euro 2022 victory meant "it was like being named Animal Rights Activist of the Year because you once smiled at a dog in the park."

The same award was made more muted the next year, but still generated negative responses: it was given to Jermaine Jenas, with fans suggesting he had even less apparent involvement in women's football than the previous year's nominees. In accepting the award, Jenas himself noted that he did not know what he had done to warrant it; The Telegraph's Tom Garry felt the award was misconceived and that men who respect women do not "deserve applause merely for not being bad human beings." Garry suggested that if the Women's Football Awards insisted on continuing with it, they should recognise men who have helped grow or promote women's football through their work.

== See also ==
- List of sports awards honoring women
