= Mercury/13 =

Women's football ownership group

- Type: Investment group
- Industry: Women's association football
- Founded: 2023
- Founders: Victoire Cogevina Reynal; Mario Malavé
- Area served: Europe and Latin America
- Website: mercury13.com

Mercury/13 is a multi-club ownership group focused on acquiring and owning professional women's association football teams across Europe and Latin America. The group was founded in 2023 by Greek-Argentine entrepreneur Victoire Cogevina Reynal, and sports entrepreneur Mario Malavé. Mercury/13 has a goal of investing $100 million in women's football clubs.

The group focuses on acquiring controlling stakes in professional women's football teams in Europe and Latin America. Their goal is to enhance the commercial power of women's football by developing a sustainable and profitable business model for these clubs.

Members of the group include, among others, former Chelsea striker Eniola Aluko, former FIFA Chief Innovation Officer Luis Vicente, co-founder of Sports Innovation Partners Michael Broughton, and former CEO and board member of Turkish club Galatasaray Ebro Koksal.

In March 2024, Mercury/13 made its first acquisition, purchasing the Serie A Women's club SSD FC Como Women. In September 2025, it was announced that Mercury/13 had acquired a majority stake in Women's Super League 2 club Bristol City W.F.C..
