= Keira Walsh =

English footballer (born 1997)

Keira Walsh MBE
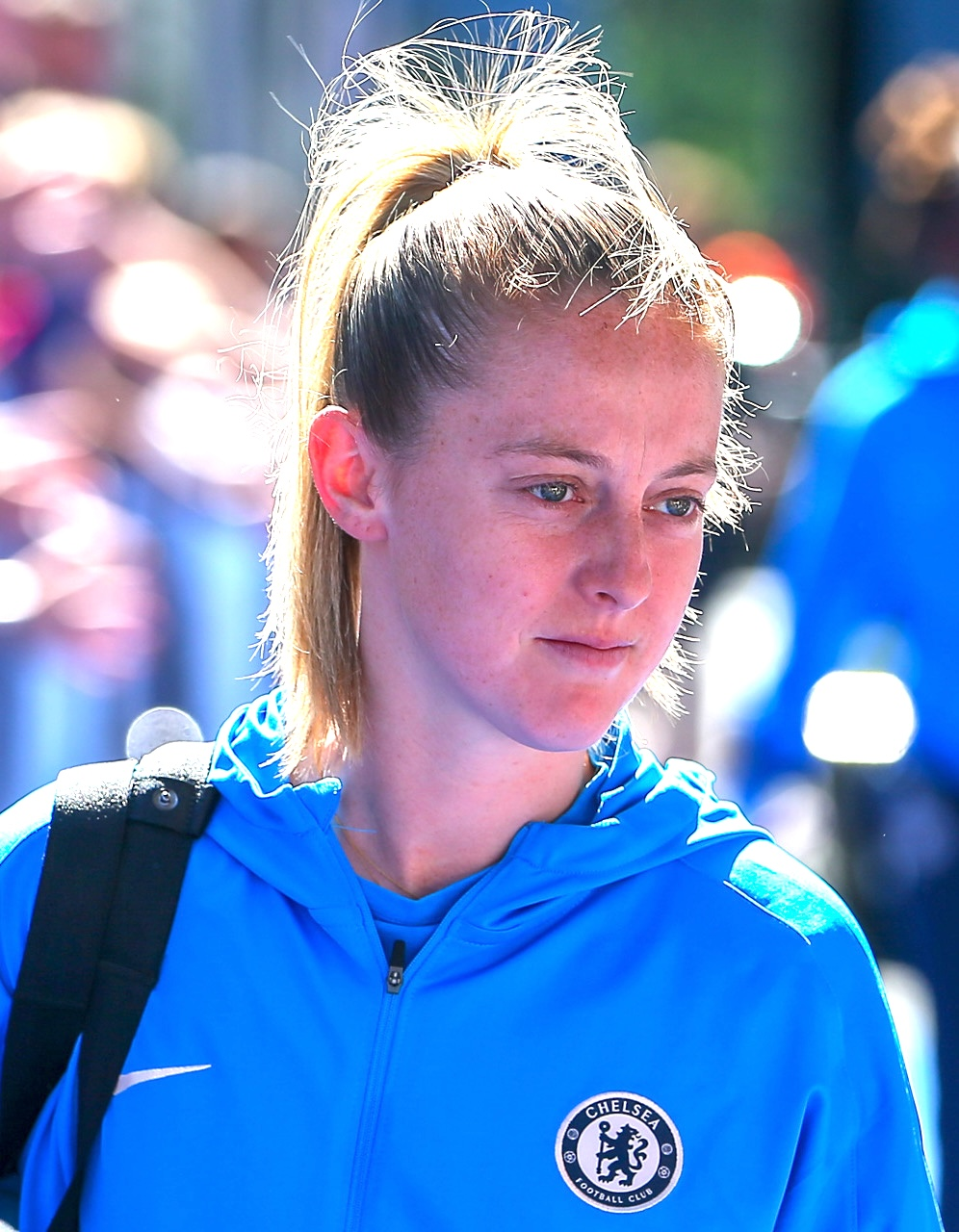
- Walsh in 2025

Personal information
- Full name: Keira Fae Walsh
- Date of birth: 8 April 1997 (age 29)
- Place of birth: Rochdale, England
- Height: 5 ft 6 in (1.67 m)
- Position: Midfielder

Team information
- Current team: Chelsea
- Number: 21

Youth career
- 2008–2014: Blackburn Rovers

Senior career*
Years	Team	Apps	(Gls)
2014	Blackburn Rovers	10	(3)
2014–2022	Manchester City	118	(6)
2022–2025	Barcelona	64	(4)
2025–	Chelsea	37	(4)

International career^{‡}
2009–2011	England U15	4	(0)
2012–2013	England U17	9	(2)
2014–2016	England U19	9	(0)
2016	England U20	0	(0)
2017	England U23	4	(0)
2017–	England	105	(2)
2021	Great Britain	3	(0)
Medal record
Women's football
Representing England
UEFA Women's Championship
Winner	2022 England
Winner	2025 Switzerland
UEFA–CONMEBOL Finalissima
Winner	2023 England
FIFA Women's World Cup
Runner-up	2023 Australia and New Zealand
- * Club domestic league appearances and goals as of 15:50, 21 November 2026 (UTC) ‡ National team caps and goals as of 23:55, 13 October 2026 (UTC)

Keira Fae Walsh (/ˈkɪərə feɪ wɒlʃ/; born 8 April 1997) is an English professional footballer who plays as a midfielder for Women's Super League club Chelsea and the England women's national team. She is considered both a playmaker and a defensive midfielder. (Note: See #Style of play. A holding midfielder, the intricacies of Walsh's position and role are discussed in various football media. The technical profile on the FC Barcelona website opened: "Keira is a defensive midfielder with outstanding playmaking skills.") She has previously played for Blackburn Rovers, Manchester City, and Barcelona, and Great Britain at the Olympics. Walsh has numerous titles, having won the Women's Super League; the Liga F; the FA Cup; the Copa de la Reina; the League Cup; the Supercopa de España; and the Champions League all on multiple occasions. With Manchester City she achieved one domestic treble, while at Barcelona she successively achieved a continental treble and continental quadruple. For the 2024–25 season, Walsh achieved two domestic trebles, one each with Barcelona and Chelsea. She was part of the England teams that won the Euro 2022 and Euro 2025, and was named player of the match in the 2022 final.

Walsh became a first team regular at City as a teenager during their 2014 campaign, playing a key role in helping the team secure their first League Cup. She stayed with the side for nine seasons (in eight years), briefly captaining them several times, and in March 2022 became the second player to reach 200 appearances for them; when she left to join Barcelona later that year, she jointly held City's record for number of appearances and set a world-record fee for a female footballer.

She represented England for their age-group teams from the age of twelve, helping the under-17 team to fourth in the 2014 U17 Euro and being named in its Team of the Tournament. She made her senior debut in 2017, for 2019 FIFA Women's World Cup qualifying, and started as captain in a match a year later. With England she has played in four major tournaments: the 2019 World Cup in which they placed fourth, the 2023 World Cup that they finished as runner-up, and the 2022 and 2025 Euros that they won. With Great Britain, she competed at the 2020 Summer Olympics. She was named in the Team of the Tournament for the 2022 Euro, and is considered one of the best players and best midfielders in the world.

== Early years ==
Keira Fae Walsh was born on 8 April 1997 in Rochdale to Peter and Tracy Walsh, and was raised by the Pennines in Syke, a rural suburb of the town. Here she practised football with her father on the field across from their house from about the age of five. She played for local boys' teams Pearson Juniors under-7s, and then Samba Stars – both coached by the father of her primary school best friend, who initially took her along – until she turned eleven.

Walsh attended Haslingden High School and Bacup and Rawtenstall Grammar School Sixth Form, both in Rossendale; Haslingden High School had girls' football teams in the first few year groups, in which Walsh played. She joined Manchester City, the team she and her family support, in July 2014, when she was seventeen; City sent her to St Bede's College in Manchester to finish her A-Levels while she trained and played with them. Future teammate Georgia Stanway would also attend St Bede's.

A dedicated Manchester City fan, Walsh was inspired as a child by Spanish football, in part due to having family in Spain and often playing in the country when visiting them, and because her father encouraged her to watch Barcelona play. She also briefly supported Arsenal, due to being a fan of Cesc Fàbregas, until she saw David Silva, her favourite player, with City.

In 2008, aged eleven, Walsh was named Greater Manchester Young Sports Person of the Year. The award was principally for her achievements in badminton: she was ranked number 1 in the county in under-13 badminton between 2007 and 2009, having taken up the sport aged nine and representing Rochdale in it. Having nearly chosen badminton over football, she described it as her "second sport" and as of 2022 still played badminton in football's off-season "as a way of keeping fit". She took part in a variety of youth level sports in 2008, including playing cricket for Lancashire and football with the Blackburn Rovers Girls' Centre of Excellence. Walsh was one of eleven Blackburn Rovers players in the 2013 Lancashire Schoolgirls football team, a team she represented in 2012 and 2013 for the Northern Counties Championship and English Schools' Football Association (ESFA) County Cup. In both years they won the Northern Championship and were runner-up in the ESFA Cup.

== Club career ==
=== Blackburn Rovers ===
==== Youth, 2008–14 ====
She got the ball, walked [a]round everyone, scored a goal and came back. One of her team-mates would win the ball and give it to her straight away. It was almost like she was a magnet.

— Kay Cossington, FA Women's Technical Director, about watching a young Walsh play for the first time

Seeking a way to continue playing football when she could no longer play with boys, Walsh attended a Football Association (FA) Skills Centre based at Kingsway Park High School at the age of eleven, where she was coached by Fara Williams. She then went to trials at the Blackburn Rovers Girls' Centre of Excellence, put forward by her childhood coach and encouraged by good performances at the Skills Centre, and joined them in 2008. She played for Blackburn Rovers in their age-group teams from under-12 through under-17. She began playing as a right-footed left-back, and then a centre-half, before moving to the central midfield at Blackburn when a new coach came in for the under-14 team and suggested she try the position.

With the Blackburn youth teams, while playing in defense and midfield, Walsh was a regular goalscorer, making four goals in six games in her first year at the club. She played for the under-17 team in the 2013 FA Girls' Youth Cup final against Arsenal, narrowly missing an opening goal, with Blackburn eventually losing the match. In the 2013–14 season, Walsh played in (and started) eleven matches for the Blackburn Rovers under-17 team, scoring ten goals to finish as their top scorer; in their 2014 FA Youth Cup quarter-final against Sunderland she scored a hat-trick in thirteen minutes.

In her five years in the Blackburn Centre of Excellence, Walsh's teams "only lost one or maybe two games". The club later saw recognition for developing midfielders in women's football, having successively produced England players Walsh, Stanway and Ella Toone. As part of the "Where Greatness Is Made" campaign, a plaque honouring Walsh was installed at Blackburn Rovers in 2022.

==== Senior, 2013–14 ====
Walsh scoring Blackburn Rovers' 2013–14 goal of the season

In February 2014, when she was sixteen, Walsh signed for Blackburn Rovers' first team until the end of the season, debuting as a half time substitute four days later. Walsh played for Blackburn as a striker: they had suffered a poor start to the league that season, and said that the addition of Walsh was key to maintaining their place in it. Still involved with the under-17 side, Walsh played in ten FA Women's Northern Premier League matches for the first team, scoring three goals, including the team's goal of the season – a "stunning" second goal against Derby County in March that brought Blackburn up from relegation. She also played for the team in the final of the Lancashire Women's Challenge Cup, said to be the best overall player in the match that the team lost, and in the fourth round of the FA Women's Cup. She left both youth and senior Blackburn Rovers sides in 2014, picking up a Contribution Award for six seasons with them.

=== Manchester City ===
==== 2014 ====
Walsh moved up to the Women's Super League (WSL) shortly after she turned seventeen. She had trained with Liverpool, which had just won back-to-back WSL titles, and been offered a place on Everton's development squad without trialling. With friends at Everton, Walsh was planning to join the club until learning Manchester City, the club she supports, was preparing to enter the WSL and holding trials for their development squad. She was uncertain about the opportunity, but her mother encouraged her to attend the trials; before the session was complete, first team coach Nick Cushing, who had gone as an observer, wanted to sign Walsh to the main squad as their holding midfielder. Cushing would later say that Walsh has "the best football brain" of any player he has coached, adding that "some players are almost touched by God"; in response, Walsh deflected praise, saying that Cushing's coaching style benefits technical and tactical players.

Within ten days of the City trials, in July 2014, Walsh made her senior debut for Manchester City as a substitute in a 1–0 win over Notts County; she would make her first start in September, against the same opponent. Too young for a professional contract, she officially trained with the development squad, for which she never made an appearance. By the end of the 2014 season she had gained a starting position in the first team and was considered important by City in their side that won the 2014 League Cup, starting in the final against Arsenal. Having not expected to play, she had initially told her parents not to travel for the game; she later said that Cushing having put his faith in her before the game led her to a successful career as it helped her believe in herself. She performed particularly well in the match, marking England legend Kelly Smith out of the game and "leaving the footballing world intrigued" by the unknown talent.

==== 2015 ====
In June 2015, Walsh signed her first professional contract with the club, until the end of 2017, though she did not play for much of the 2015 season due to injury. Manchester City added her to their 2015 League Cup squad in August. The team was briefly suspended for fielding Walsh, who the FA claimed was an unregistered player, before the matter was resolved; the FA admitted they "might have" lost the registration documents. The team's quarter-final against Arsenal, which City lost, had been postponed due to the investigation. A crucial part of his City plans since the start, Cushing started building the team around Walsh and made her one of its vice-captains.

==== 2016 ====
Walsh was injured again at the start of the 2016 league campaign but worked her way back onto the squad and, in September, was described as their "unsung hero" by 90min. Having gone undefeated, City won the league in September with a game to spare, Walsh described by Women's Soccer United as "unassuming" and "pivotal" in their success. In October, they won the 2016 League Cup for the domestic double. Walsh was named player of the match in City's first-ever Champions League match, a 2–0 victory against Zvezda Perm; a month later, on 9 November 2016, she scored her first goal for City, a long-range strike from outside the area, in a 1–0 victory against Brøndby IF in the first leg of their Champions League last-16 tie. Cushing hailed her as "up there with the best, if not the best, players in the league" and, two days later, she extended her contract through 2020. For the 2015 and 2016 season, Walsh was nominated for the Professional Footballers' Association (PFA) Women's Young Player of the Year award; she would see further nominations for this award every year up to and including the 2018–19 season.

==== 2017 ====
With Manchester City, Walsh won all three women's domestic titles over what would be a regular 2016–17 season (2016 FA WSL, 2016 WSL Cup, 2016–17 FA Women's Cup); the WSL ran calendar year seasons until 2017, curtailing the season (known as the Spring Series) in spring to start a new one in autumn that matched European schedules. During the season, Walsh captained City for the first time, on 9 May 2017 in a 3–0 win over Bristol City. For the 2017 FA Women's Cup final a few days later, in which City defeated Birmingham 4–1, Walsh was named player of the match, saying only that "it was a real team effort" and that it was special to win a trophy at Wembley; Cushing and captain Steph Houghton heaped praise on Walsh's performance and maturity. City was the first team to hold all three England women's domestic trophies at the same time, but were denied another title by Chelsea, which won the Spring Series and left City second in a tight race decided on the final day.

==== 2017–18 ====
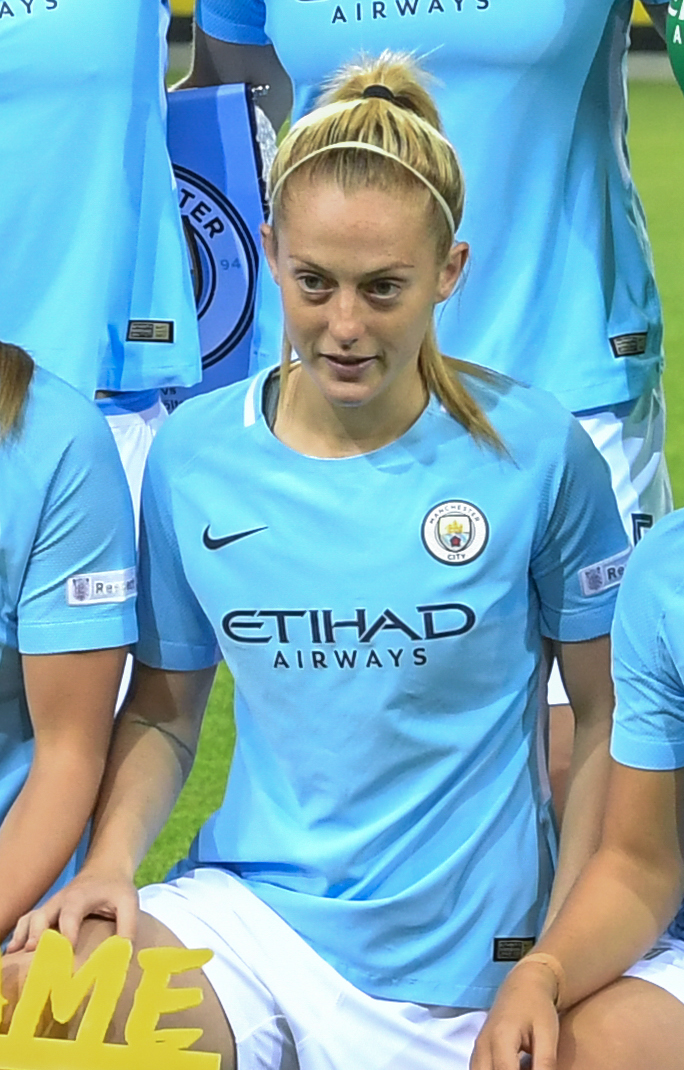
Walsh with Manchester City in 2017

During the summer pre-season for their 2017–18 season, Walsh captained the team, something she also did later in the season. At the end of 2017, also accounting for the previous season, Walsh was listed at number 98 on The 100 Best Female Footballers in the World list by The Offside Rule/The Guardian. Regularly running games for Manchester City, Walsh also picked up the Northwest Football Rising Star Award. In 2018, Walsh was nominated for the FWA Women's Footballer of the Year Award and the FSF Women's Player of the Year Award, and was the only PFA Women's Young Player of the Year nominee in a senior international squad – she was the runner-up for this award. Walsh was voted the Manchester City W.F.C. Official Supporters' Club Player of the Season.

==== 2018–19 ====
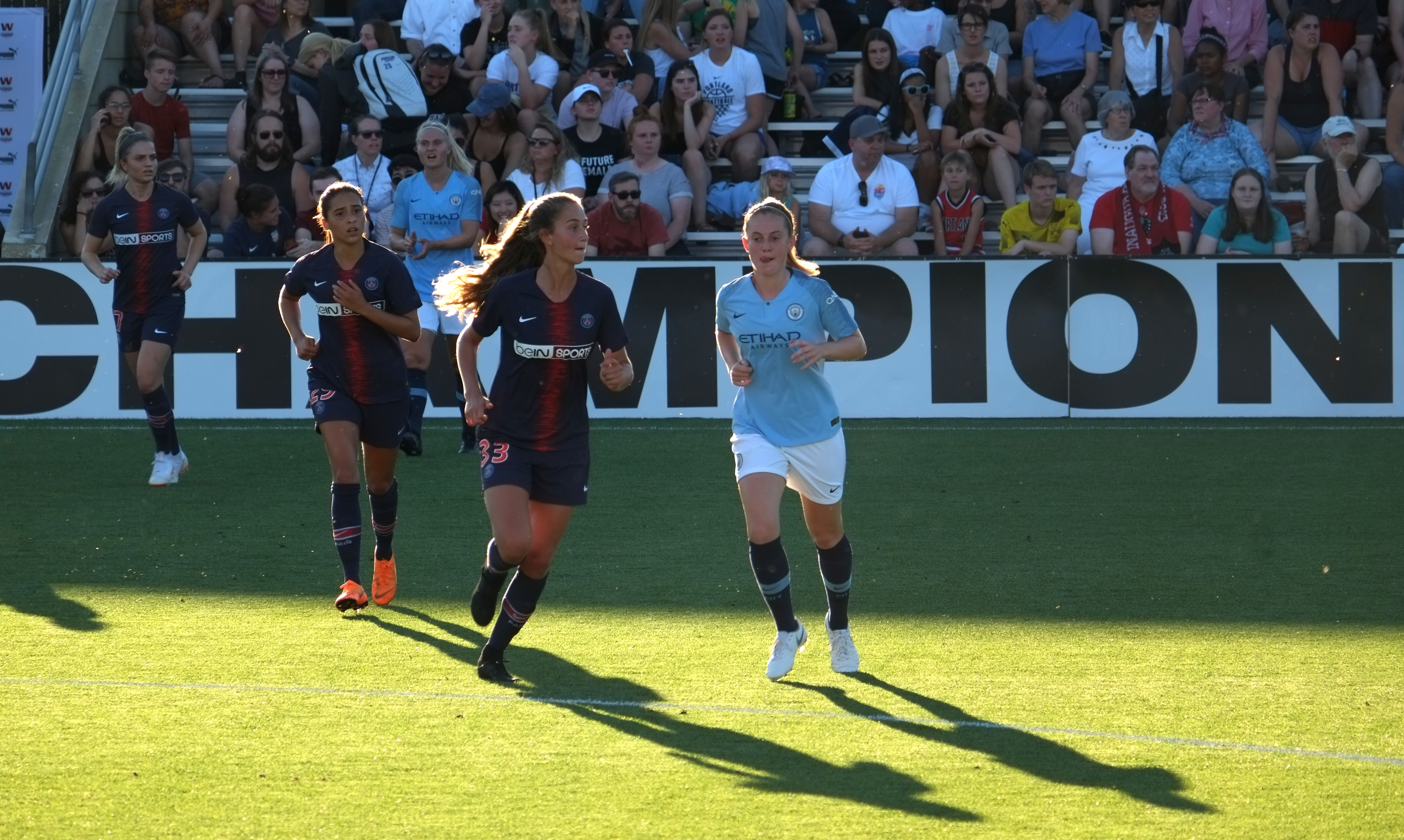
Walsh (right) during pre-season for Manchester City in 2018

Manchester City held their pre-season in the United States, which Walsh felt was a positive in terms of the team's professionalism, and came third in the invitational 2018 Women's International Champions Cup. Their competitive fixtures for the 2018–19 season then began in August with the early rounds of the 2018–19 League Cup: in their opening match, Walsh saw her penalty saved in the eventual 0–0 (5–4 p) win over Birmingham.

Early in the season, Walsh captained City for the away leg of their Champions League Round of 32 tie against Atlético Madrid, drawing 1–1 when away goals were an advantage. City lost the return fixture 0–2 to be knocked out in the Round of 32 for the first time, the start of a five-season pattern of exiting the Champions League by Spanish opposition that helped prompt Walsh to leave the club (for Spain) in 2022. By October 2018, though Manchester City had not had bad results in the league, they were considered in a slump; pundit Rachel Brown-Finnis credited this to the team having become predictable to improving opposition teams in their reliance on playing out from the back through Walsh, despite the efficacy of this tactic.

At the end of stoppage time during City's 3–0 victory over Liverpool in November 2018 – in which Walsh provided the assist for the only open play goal and got in several shots on target (all saved) herself – Liverpool's Rinsola Babajide made a harsh tackle that took down Walsh, who stayed down in pain before being stretchered off and the game ended. After initial fears of a broken leg, assessment confirmed she only suffered a minor knee injury. On 2 December 2018, Walsh became the sixth City player to make 100 appearances for the team; in the match she provided a "glorious 60-yard pass" to set up City's second goal in a 2–0 victory that extended their season's unbeaten run and ended Arsenal's winning run.

After having exited the FA Cup in the semi-finals in 2018, City reclaimed the trophy in 2019, defeating West Ham in the final 3–0, with Walsh scoring the opening goal. They took a domestic double, having also won the League Cup, not losing a domestic match prior to their final game against Arsenal. In April 2019, Walsh was nominated for both the PFA Women's Young Player of the Year and Women's Players' Player of the Year awards. In September 2019, also accounting for the international season, Walsh was shortlisted for the dream team FIFA FIFPRO The Best Women's World 11, the only English midfielder to be named. At the end of the year, she placed joint-ninth (with Jennifer Hermoso) on the International Federation of Football History & Statistics (IFFHS) ranking of the Women's World Best Playmaker.

==== 2019–20 ====
With doubts about her career following criticism at the 2019 FIFA Women's World Cup, Walsh did not want to play football in England, thinking she was not what the domestic fans wanted to see in a holding midfielder. Prior to the 2019–20 season, she handed in a transfer request amid interest from European champions Lyon and Spanish champions Atlético Madrid. On 29 July, she withdrew her transfer request; Cushing had convinced her to stay by encouraging her and joking that he would dress like Pep Guardiola, one of Walsh's idols, to be more like him. Cushing said that Walsh was integral to City's system and it was imperative the club retain her, while adapting to other transfers. He re-emphasised Walsh's importance to the side after she scored a goal from distance then created the opportunity for a second in an October 2019 match that saw them defeat Birmingham 3–0.

During a Manchester derby in the League Cup on 20 October 2019, Walsh was given a straight red card for a tackle on Manchester United's Kirsty Hanson. City lost 0–2, with Walsh later reflecting that her conduct came from being a fan of her team and frustrated that their rivals were winning, and that she had since come to practice more control over her support than she displayed in the match. Around this time, Walsh's abilities were said to be maturing. While still "an energetic presence in midfield that at times needs to be dialled down" – and sometimes requiring the presence of experienced midfielder Jill Scott in support – she had tightened her defensive capabilities and discipline to complement her excellent positioning and playmaking skill, in which she was also becoming more assured.

After scoring from distance against Birmingham again in January 2020, for a 2–0 win, Walsh signed a new three-year contract on 7 February 2020. 90min wrote that this was somewhat surprising to onlookers – considering Walsh's long tenure, prior transfer request, and Cushing recently leaving the club – but that City and its fans would welcome her decision. Come the end of the season, her leadership and talent in midfield saw her described as "unmatched".

==== 2020–21 ====
Said by the Manchester Evening News to be growing in confidence in her role, the newspaper considered Walsh the key player for City ahead of their attempt to win the league for the first time since their successful 2016 campaign, after being retroactively demoted to second place due to points per game calculations in the previous season. Walsh started her 2020–21 pre-season with City by scoring a goal in a 6–0 win before they contested, and lost, the Women's FA Community Shield in its first edition since 2008.

In November 2020, Walsh scored the third goal for City in an 8–1 win over Bristol and, in March 2021, she scored the sole goal on Houghton's 200th cap, taking City to a ninth consecutive WSL victory. Coach Gareth Taylor (who replaced Cushing as manager in 2020) joked after the match that Walsh "was getting a bit sick of everyone else missing chances", adding that she did not need to score goals as the club recognised the importance of her role. Website GOAL opined that, since her role is often unsung, "such a vital goal served to remind everyone of Walsh's quality." Later in March, Houghton picked up an injury that kept her out for over a month, and Walsh took up the armband as City captain. At the end of March, Walsh was named player of the match in the team's home-leg Champions League quarter-final fixture against Barcelona, a 2–1 victory that was Barcelona's only loss on the route to their first Champions League title; her game was described by her club as "the complete midfield performance", and by The Guardian as "at times suggesting [Barcelona] are mortal after all."

By May 2021, Walsh had scored only seven goals for Manchester City, six of which were from outside the box; the club wrote that she "tends to save her super strikes for the big occasions", praising her impact in other areas. At the end of 2020, Walsh was ranked 62 on the Offside Rule/The Guardian's list of The 100 Best Female Footballers in the World. For the 2020–21 season, she was nominated for the England Women's Player of the Year award.

==== 2021–22 ====
Walsh was one of several injured players out at the start of the 2021–22 season, which Manchester City began poorly. She first returned to playing in October 2021 and, in November, scored a powerful strike against Leicester from the edge of the box to put City ahead, which was shortlisted for the WSL goal of the month. Absent again until January 2022, she returned with other players to help City to a win against Brighton in their first match of the new year. The season then turned in their favour, including winning the 2022 League Cup in March. Later that month, Walsh made her 200th appearance for the club, becoming the second player, following Houghton, to reach a double century. She only found out she had achieved the milestone after the match, when teammate Janine Beckie told her and gathered the team to celebrate.

From March through May, City maintained an all-win streak; Walsh was particularly influential in their FA Cup semi-final victory, before City's run eventually ended when they lost 2–3 in extra time in the 2022 FA Cup final. In May, Walsh was nominated for City's Player of the Season, with the club feeling she had "taken her game to a new level" during it. Manchester City under Taylor played Walsh differently from the start, with Walsh staying close to and mainly passing to the defense; while continuing to have among the highest passing statistics in the WSL, her passing metrics, as well as "almost all of her metrics around attacking play", "dropped significantly" in the 2021–22 season. Podcast The Offside Rule said in early July 2022 that this change had left Walsh, a playmaker now limited in opportunities to progress play and superfluous defensively, "with rather little to do."

Accounting for both the domestic and international season, Walsh was ranked the sixth-best UEFA Women's Player of the Year for 2021–22, and the third-best England Women's Player of the Year in October 2022. Later in October, she was nominated for the FSA Women's Player of the Year Award.

==== 2022–23 ====
With one year left on her City contract, Walsh again attracted interest from "several top European clubs", including Chelsea and Barcelona, following the 2021–22 season. Over the summer of 2022, several key members of City's women's squad left either through free transfer or retirement. Walsh played two Champions League qualification matches for City in August 2022, as part of the 2022–23 pre-season, (Note: Soccerway statistics credit Walsh with the sixth goal (90+2') Manchester City scored against Tomiris-Turan on 18 August 2022; the UEFA match report lists it as an own goal off keeper Aytaj Sharifova. The Guardian match summary described it both as a Walsh goal and as "diverted in off" the keeper. It is not included here.) before leaving the club to join Barcelona in September after eight years; eight major trophies; and 211 appearances, the joint-record number of appearances for Manchester City (with Houghton) at the time. In a post on Instagram, Walsh wrote: "Even though I will no longer play in the shirt, City is in my blood and always will be." She later said that she had not planned to leave City in the summer of 2022, that it "wasn't an easy decision", but that it was the right time to leave her comfort zone.

=== Barcelona ===
==== Transfer and 2022–23 ====
Walsh had been connected with a move to Spain as early as May 2022, but was surprised to be contacted by Barcelona in August. Though women's football rarely drew transfer fees, both Chelsea and Barcelona made Manchester City large offers for her. Having been inspired by Barcelona as a child, and told by her father that she should endeavour to play for them, Walsh wanted to join this team; Barcelona felt the need to bring in reinforcements after injury to star midfielder Alexia Putellas and other departures, and made several offers. Sports director Markel Zubizarreta and head coach Jonatan Giráldez said at different times that they did not plan for Walsh to be a direct replacement of Putellas, but another option within the team, as she offers a different playing style to others. After a lengthy high-profile pursuit, the last of Barcelona's offers, around £400,000 (€470,000), a world-record fee, was accepted shortly before the transfer deadline on 7 September 2022. This was considerably higher than the previous women's transfer record, set when Pernille Harder transferred for £250,000 in 2020, and Barcelona's previous record signing of a female player, set when they purchased Mapi León for €50,000 in 2017. Walsh said that while "the price tag [is] a nice feeling", she prefers not to be the centre of attention; she said she felt honoured to join Barcelona, pointing to the team's level and that "it is such a historic club, and [...] more than that, it is a culture." She signed to Barcelona for three years, joining England teammate Lucy Bronze, who also moved from City to Barcelona in 2022.

At the end of 2022, Walsh featured near the top of several women's football rankings, (Note: Including the GOAL50, FourFourTwo's lists of the best defensive midfielders and best players in the world, Fotbollskanalen's list of the best in the world, and The Daily Telegraph's list of the best in Europe.) including coming third on the IFFHS ranking of the Women's World Best Playmaker and entering the Top 10 of the list of The 100 Best Female Footballers for the first time. In early 2023, she was named to the 2022 FIFPRO World 11 and won the inaugural Women's Football Awards International Player of the Year award, as well as being nominated for The Best FIFA Women's Player. At the end of the season she placed seventh in the ranking of the 2022–23 UEFA Women's Player of the Year and was included on the 25-person list of GOAL's "World-Class Club".

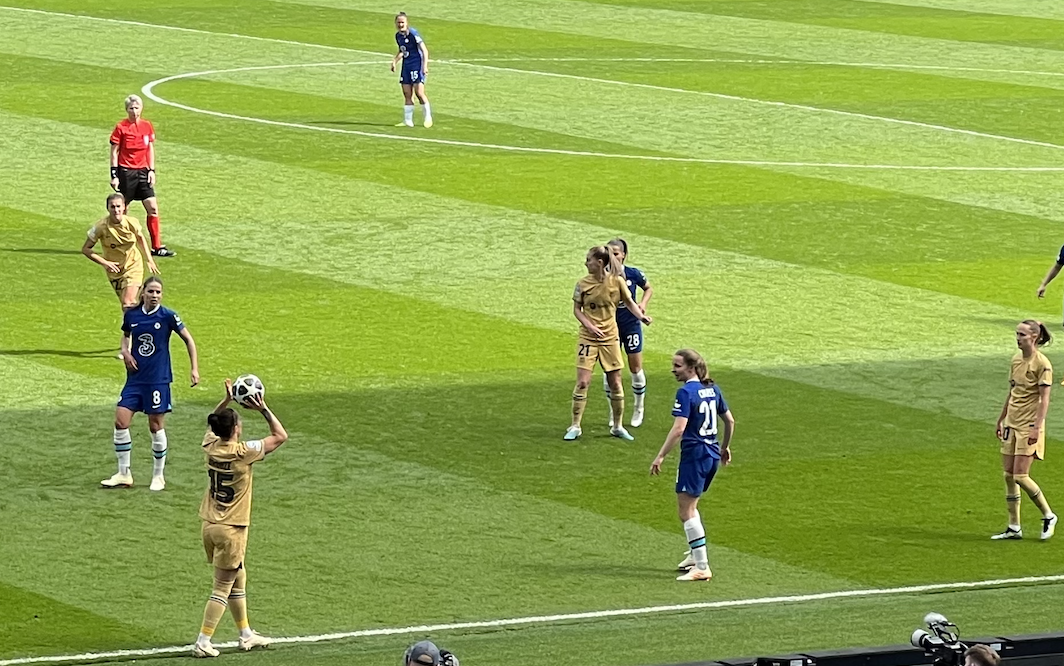
Walsh (central; gold number 21) during the away leg of the Champions League semi-final against Chelsea in 2023

Although she faced pressure while adapting to the specialised number 6 role at Barcelona, Walsh "felt much better after the Christmas break"; fellow holding midfielder Patri Guijarro felt they played fluidly together from Christmas onwards and that Walsh had adapted "in record time". Increasingly comfortable within the squad, she reached her peak form again. A key part of the team from the start of the 2022–23 season, Walsh won her first title with them in January 2023 with the 2022–23 Supercopa de España: she helped Barcelona to victory playing in both the semi-final and, despite having gone off during extra-time in the semi-final with an injury, the final three days later on 22 January. In subsequent games, she was rested with the injury; shortly after her return she scored her first goal for Barcelona, on 5 February against Real Betis, with a shot from outside the box.

Walsh was differential for Barcelona in the away leg victory of their Champions League semi-final tie against Chelsea, playing what Sport said was her best game for the club yet, in which "she showed that version of pivot that characterises the azulgrana style." Walsh reached the final of the Champions League for the first time after Barcelona defeated Chelsea 2–1 on aggregate. Three days later, on 30 April, the team won the league at home with four matches to play and an all-wins record. Walsh started in the 2023 Champions League final, and, per Suzanne Wrack, was crucial in Barcelona mounting a 3–2 comeback to win the 2022–23 Champions League.

==== 2023–24 ====
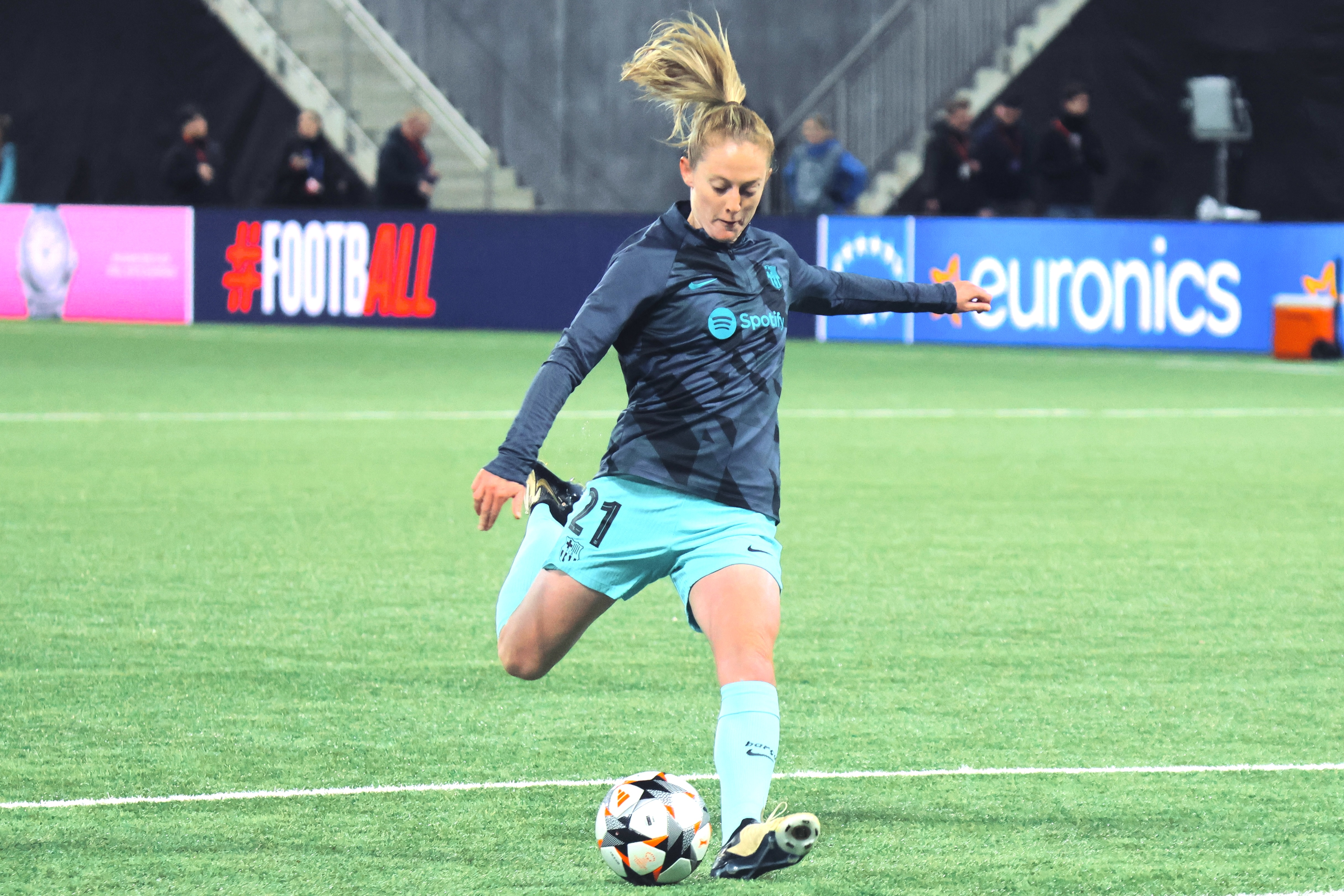
Walsh warming up before a Champions League match in 2024

Walsh missed the start of Barcelona's 2023–24 season with injury, returning in October 2023. Used as a substitute attacking midfielder in her first match back, she provided an assist within minutes of entering the pitch. She then had a successful season in her role as pivot, cementing her strength within the team and excelling personally. In January 2024, The Guardian wrote that Walsh, Guijarro and Aitana Bonmatí "created one of the most formidable midfields the women's game has seen"; the three were each given perfect 10 ratings for the season by Sport, which described Walsh as "the orchestra director of this tetra-champion team." Barcelona won a continental quadruple of the 2023–24 Supercopa, the league, the 2023–24 Copa de la Reina, and the 2023–24 UEFA Women's Champions League. Walsh again started in the Champions League final, making vital recoveries as they defeated Lyon 2–0, her performance called a recital by Maria Tikas.

The Guardian felt that the most significant part of Walsh's game continued to be "her sublime passing quality", even with more goal contributions. She had scored in consecutive games in Barcelona's last two matches of 2023, with the only open play goal in a 2–0 Liga F win and the opener in a 7–0 Champions League group stage victory, her first Champions League goal for the club, both from inside the area. El Periódico said of the first that Walsh must have "chased away some of the demons that accompanied her every time she approached the area."

She again picked up a variety of accolades at the end of 2023, including a nomination for The Best FIFA Women's Player and being voted the She's A Baller of the Year. Walsh placed fourth both in the IFFHS Women's World Best Playmaker ranking and on The 100 Best Female Footballers list, while also featuring in the 2023 FIFPRO World 11; on ESPN's list of the 50 best women's footballers; and being one of nine Barcelona players on the GOAL50 list. At the end of the season, she was again included in the GOAL "World-Class Club".

==== 2024–25 ====
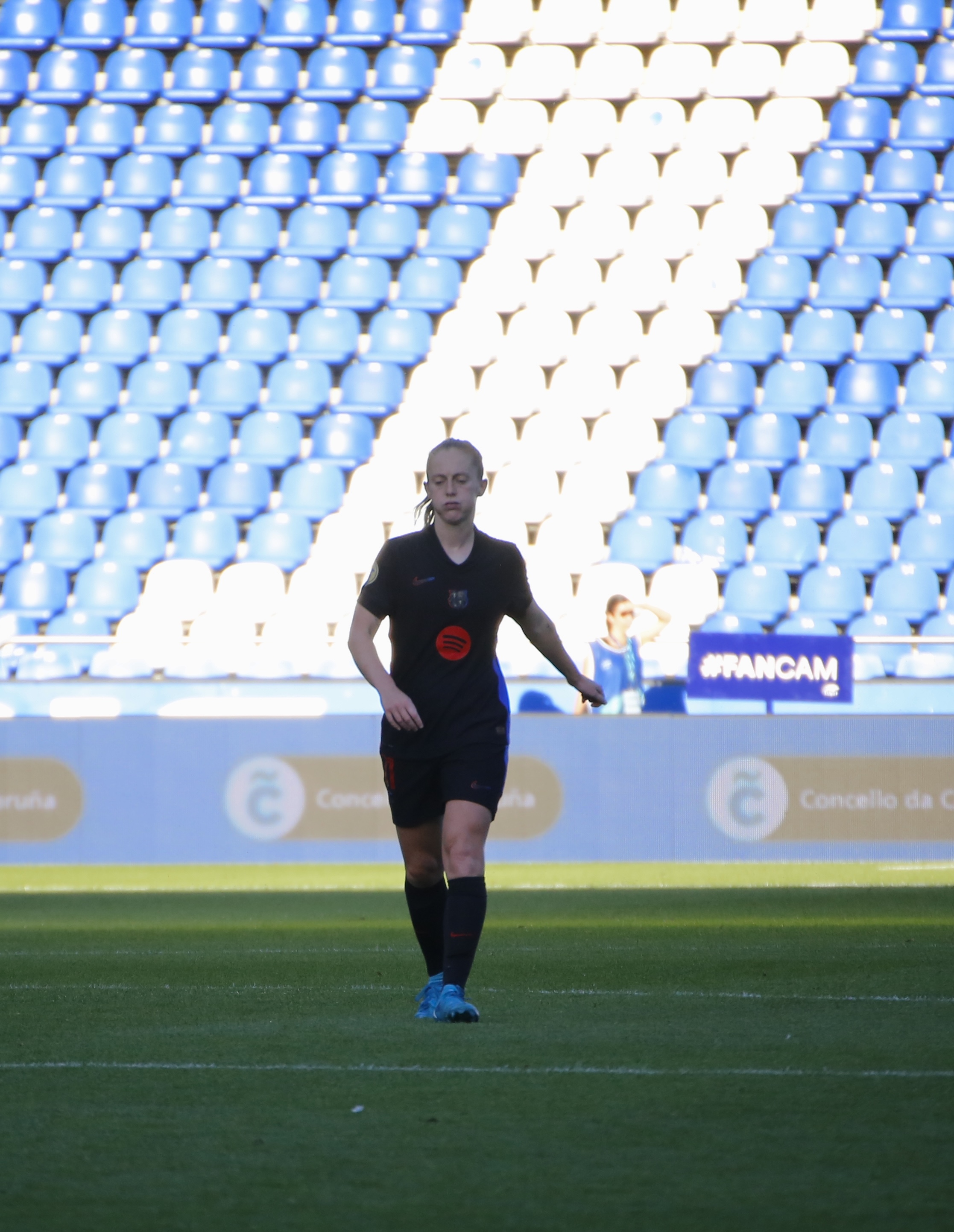
Walsh with Barcelona in 2024

Ahead of the 2024–25 season, there was renewed interest from Chelsea and, especially, Arsenal in signing Walsh; the transfer pursuit continued throughout the pre-season, with Arsenal ultimately making an offer of €1.1 million (£930,000) plus add-ons – which would have been a significant increase on the world record fee – on 12 September 2024, a day before the transfer deadline. Barcelona considered Walsh vital to their squad for the upcoming season, and she participated in pre-season, including scoring a golazo from outside the area in their friendly against Hoffenheim on 10 August 2024; Barcelona declined the offer. Their second 2024–25 league game was played on WSL deadline day, and Walsh "silenced the rumours" of a last-minute transfer when she started the match and provided the assist for Caroline Graham Hansen's opening goal.

At the end of September, Walsh had an impressive headed goal dubiously disallowed, before scoring her first professional career brace at the start of October with two edge-of-the-box goals and an assist as she led Barcelona's 8–1 second half victory over Madrid CFF. Walsh reflected: "I don't normally score two in a season, so two in one game is amazing ... I wasn't sure how to celebrate after the second one, actually." (Note: Indeed, Walsh had 0.5 expected goals for Barcelona in 2024–25.) She enthusiastically celebrated her next goal, scored from a similar distance against SKN St. Pölten in a particularly strong match for Walsh, which was nominated for the Champions League Goal of the Week.

After this, with Putellas back to full fitness, Walsh was more often sidelined by new head coach Pere Romeu, who struggled to manage a four-player midfield and preferred a more attack-minded formation. Though Walsh was still a regular starter in the Champions League, she "lost a lot of prominence" and was used as a substitute in headline domestic matches. At the end of 2024, she was again included in the FIFPRO Women's World 11 and nominated for The Best FIFA Women's Player, and featured in the top 10 of various ranking lists. (Note: Walsh placed fourth on FourFourTwo's list of the top 50 women's footballers of the year; fifth on Bleacher Report's top 25 list, with the suggestion Walsh "has a chance to be remembered as the Lionesses' greatest ever player when she eventually hangs up her boots"; and ninth on the ESPN 50 Best Women's Players list.) She placed eighteenth on The 100 Best Female Footballers list, dropping out of the Top 10 in part due to "not always being a guaranteed starter in a stacked Barcelona midfield". FourFourTwo published a retrospective list in January 2025, ranking Walsh as the 81st best women's footballer of all time.

Walsh made her 100th competitive appearance for Barcelona on 26 January 2025, for the final of the 2024–25 Supercopa, coming on for the last five minutes as Barcelona defeated Real Madrid 5–0 to win the title. Also her final appearance for the club, she transferred five days later having achieved eight trophies before departing; she would win a further two titles, and a domestic treble with Barcelona for the season, when they won the league and 2024–25 Copa de la Reina in May and June. Considered an important part of Barcelona's "golden era", Walsh later said that homesickness was her primary motivation for leaving Barcelona.

=== Chelsea ===
==== Transfer and 2024–25 ====
Speculation and interest in Walsh transferring to the WSL had continued throughout her last half-season at Barcelona. On 30 January 2025, WSL winter deadline day, the media announced that Chelsea had signed Walsh for €550,000 (£440,000–£460,000) – which Barcelona reportedly said could go up to €956,000 (£800,000) with bonuses. The base fee meant that Walsh was the subject of two of the five most expensive transfers in women's football at the time, four days after Chelsea also signed Naomi Girma for a new world record fee. The club had sought out Walsh and Girma in January, after signing Bronze ahead of the season, as part of their plan to build a squad to win the Champions League. Walsh signed a contract through 2029, which was announced by Chelsea on 31 January; the announcement had been delayed due to the Royal Spanish Football Federation offices closing before the deadline, with international clearance only approved the next day. She made her debut for Chelsea two days later, coming on as a 78th-minute substitute in a 1–0 away win against Aston Villa on 2 February. Head coach Sonia Bompastor said that, due to Walsh travelling and having limited training time, they had not planned to use her in the match; Bompastor and pundits were impressed with her impact late in the game.

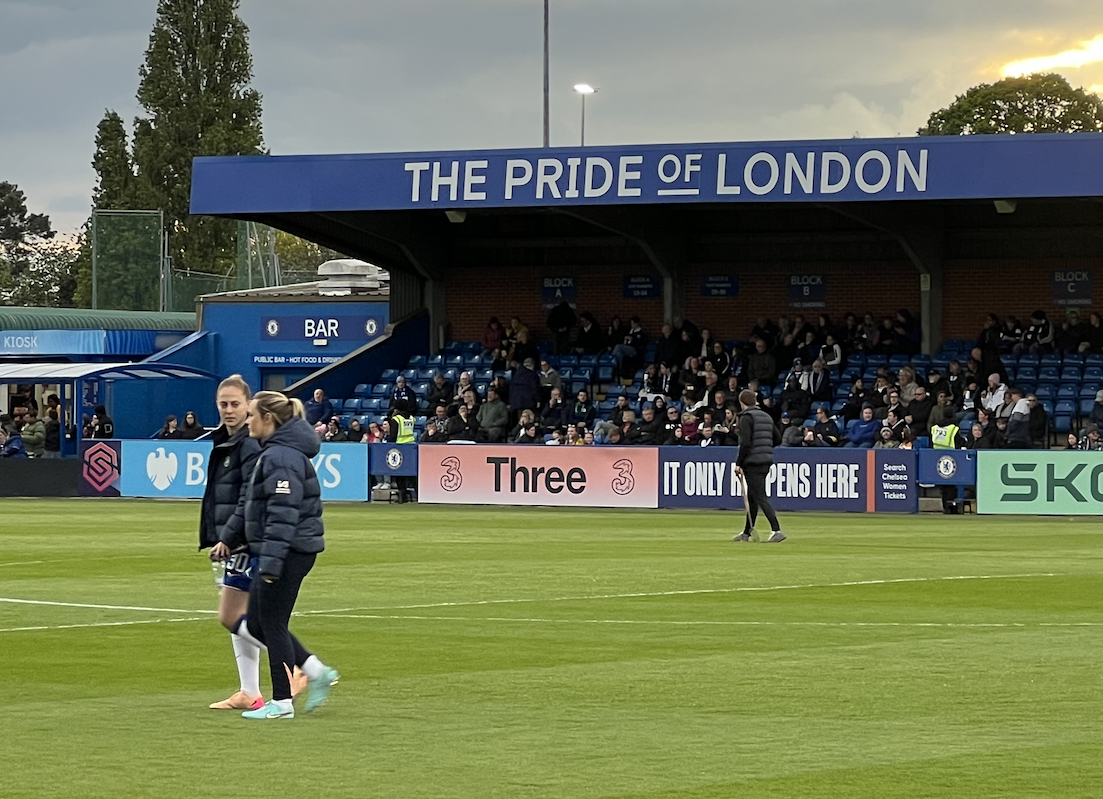
Walsh (left) with Erin Cuthbert before a match in 2025

Walsh became an instant fixture after this, making appearances in all domestic competitions as she ran Chelsea's midfield and brought balance and "serenity" to the team, until she picked up an injury against Brighton on 2 March. This prevented her from playing in the final as she achieved her first trophy with Chelsea, when the club won the 2024–25 Women's League Cup later that month. They then played, and were knocked out by, Barcelona in the semi-finals of the Champions League for the third consecutive season in April. In the aggregate 2–8 loss for Chelsea, Walsh was almost overwhelmed by her former teammates in the midfield. Chelsea won the league at the end of April with two games to spare in an unbeaten season, and sealed a domestic treble by winning the 2024–25 Women's FA Cup in May, with Walsh delivering a "tactically influential performance" in the final. Walsh took time to get used to Chelsea's "more free" style of play – with Bompastor encouraging her to continue playing as a pure holding midfielder – and had a generally quiet first season for Chelsea, playing consistently without taking the spotlight. As with the previous season, in August 2025 Walsh was included in the GOAL "World-Class Club".

==== 2025–26 ====
From the start of the 2025–26 season, Walsh "added more to her game at Chelsea while continuing to excel at what she can do best", taking more shots on goal while shifting Chelsea's style of play to focus on possession. She provoked an Aston Villa own goal in her second WSL match to score for Chelsea, (Note: Opta statistics, Chelsea, and (initially) the WSL credit Walsh with the second goal (55') Chelsea scored against Aston Villa on 14 September 2025. However, Walsh described her 12 October 2025 goal as her first for Chelsea, and the Aston Villa goal is otherwise described as an own goal off Missy Bo Kearns. It is not included here.) before having a powerful shot narrowly saved against Leicester later in September. She was player of the match for this game as well as the 12 October 2025 1–0 victory over Tottenham Hotspur during which she scored her first goal for Chelsea in a "moment of brilliance". Her first goal in the WSL since 2021, it took Walsh to a joint-record for percentage of a player's WSL goals scored from outside the box (71%) and a matchday-low xG value of 0.04 for a successful shot. She was shortlisted for WSL goal of the month and won Chelsea Women's goal of the month before later being shortlisted for Chelsea Women's goal of the season. In her first 2025–26 Champions League league phase game a few days later, Walsh was involved in the first three of Chelsea's four goals against Paris FC, before captaining her side against St. Pölten in November. She continued to captain Chelsea sporadically throughout the season, during Millie Bright's long-term absence then retirement and when Erin Cuthbert was not on the pitch.

Walsh was the only Chelsea player to start all of the team's ten league games in the first half of the season, including the last of these, a 0–1 loss to Everton for their first defeat of the season, for which she also wore the armband again. At the end of 2025, she was shortlisted for both the FIFA and FIFPRO Women's World XIs (Note: Walsh placed joint-10th with Irene Paredes for outfield player voting in the FIFA World XI; Paredes was included.) and placed on The 100 Best Female Footballers and ESPN 50 lists. Walsh was then sidelined with injury until February 2026, returning to provide an attacking outlet from corners, though without scoring, in Chelsea's 1–5 loss to Manchester City. In their next match, a 2–0 victory over Tottenham Hotspur, Walsh opened scoring with a similar powerful strike following a corner, before going off at half time to manage her return from injury. Again on the shortlist for Chelsea Women's goal of the month, in February, Walsh was also the only Chelsea player shortlisted for WSL Player of the Year at the London Football Awards. On 15 March 2026, and having missed their quarter- and semi- final matches with injury, Walsh won her sixth League Cup with Chelsea's victory in the 2026 League Cup final.

After Chelsea was knocked out of the Champions League in the quarter-finals by Arsenal in early April, Walsh reflected they had a better performance in the second leg at home but had given themselves too much left to do after a disappointing first leg loss. Days later, Walsh was named player of the match as Chelsea again defeated Tottenham Hotspur, this time 2–1 in the quarter-final of the 2025–26 Women's FA Cup, with Walsh being involved in both of Chelsea's goals. Chelsea then lost late in the game to City in the FA Cup semi-final; City also beat Chelsea to win the league for the first time since 2016, with City fans voting former player Walsh into their WSL champions combined XI. Instead of the FA Cup final, Chelsea went on to compete in the London edition of World Sevens Football in May. Walsh played four games and contributed two goals, including one in the final, and two assists in their victory.

==== 2026–27 ====
Ahead of Chelsea's pre-season for the 2026–27 season, Walsh participated in the pre-season of German team 1. FC Köln (whose league started earlier than the WSL and which her partner captains) in order to prepare with more fitness training and ball drills. She stayed with FC until 20 July, not playing in their pre-season games, before returning to Chelsea and travelling to Australia to make an impactful substitute appearance in the 2026 A-Leagues All Stars Women game.

Walsh scored her first Champions League goal for Chelsea in the second leg of their Champions League third qualifying round tie against Real Sociedad; following a 5–2 home victory in the first leg, Walsh scored the only goal of the away game from distance and was player of the match as Chelsea qualified for the league phase.

In their league campaign, Walsh scored and assisted against Manchester United in the second game of the season to mark her 50th competitive appearance for Chelsea and 100th WSL match, (Note: While branded as the WSL; Walsh also made 47 appearances in the same competition while branded as WSL1.) taking her first of three consecutive player of the match awards. In the third of these, Walsh scored again with the most shots and dribbles of the match, three chances created and six duels won. By the fifth matchday, she had taken the joint-sixth most shots of the WSL season.

== International career ==
=== England ===
==== 2009–17: Youth level ====
When Walsh played for the Blackburn Rovers under-14 team, her club insistently persuaded Kay Cossington – at the time the only scout for the England women's youth teams – to travel up to Preston to watch her play. In November 2009, Walsh, aged twelve, received her first call-up to train for the England under-15 girls, making her the youngest person in the squad. She played for them in 2010 and 2011. Though she featured in the England squads for all youth age groups, she did not get a chance to thrive in them, only participating in one major competition; she suffered two serious ankle injuries as a youth international, eventually having surgery in 2016. She later reflected that the lack of youth experience may have contributed to her being unprepared for the criticism players receive at international tournaments when she joined the senior squad.

Moving into the under-17 women's squad as its vice-captain, Walsh was named a key player in the 2013 season. During the July 2013 women's Nordic Cup she scored two goals, including one in the first minute of the play-off match against Iceland. In November 2013, she was named as a forward in the squad for the 2014 UEFA Women's Under-17 Championship (held in November and December 2013), helping England to a fourth-place finish in the competition. She scored their last spot kick in the 0–0 (3–4 (p)) third place play-off penalty shoot-out loss and was one of the England players included in the team of the tournament.

Walsh was then selected to the under-19 England squad, for which she was sometimes a striker, while still playing at under-17 club level. Called to training with the England under-19 second team in January 2014, she made a competitive appearance for the first team a week later. In the youth squads, Walsh was considered the class clown in contrast to Leah Williamson's more serious demeanour, and Walsh was not always brought in for training camps at the start of her under-19 career. Walsh said that, when she was sixteen, coach Mo Marley told her that she needed to work harder; missing out on selections at this age and Marley's warning, which she felt was tough love and indicative of Marley believing in her, "was a massive career defining moment". Realising she did not want to lose out on football, Walsh began to further apply herself.

She served as under-19 captain for some of their appearances at the March 2015 La Manga Tournament in Spain, and wore the armband again after returning from injury for 2016 U19 Euro preparation matches in September and November 2015. She then picked up her second ankle injury while on international duty with the under-19 side in La Manga in March 2016. Walsh was named in the squad for an under-20 tournament in September 2016, but had to withdraw. With the under-23 squad, Walsh played in La Manga and won the Nordic Tournament in 2017, though fans and pundits felt she should have been "a necessity" for the senior team at the UEFA Women's Euro 2017.

==== 2017–19: Senior debut and minor tournaments ====
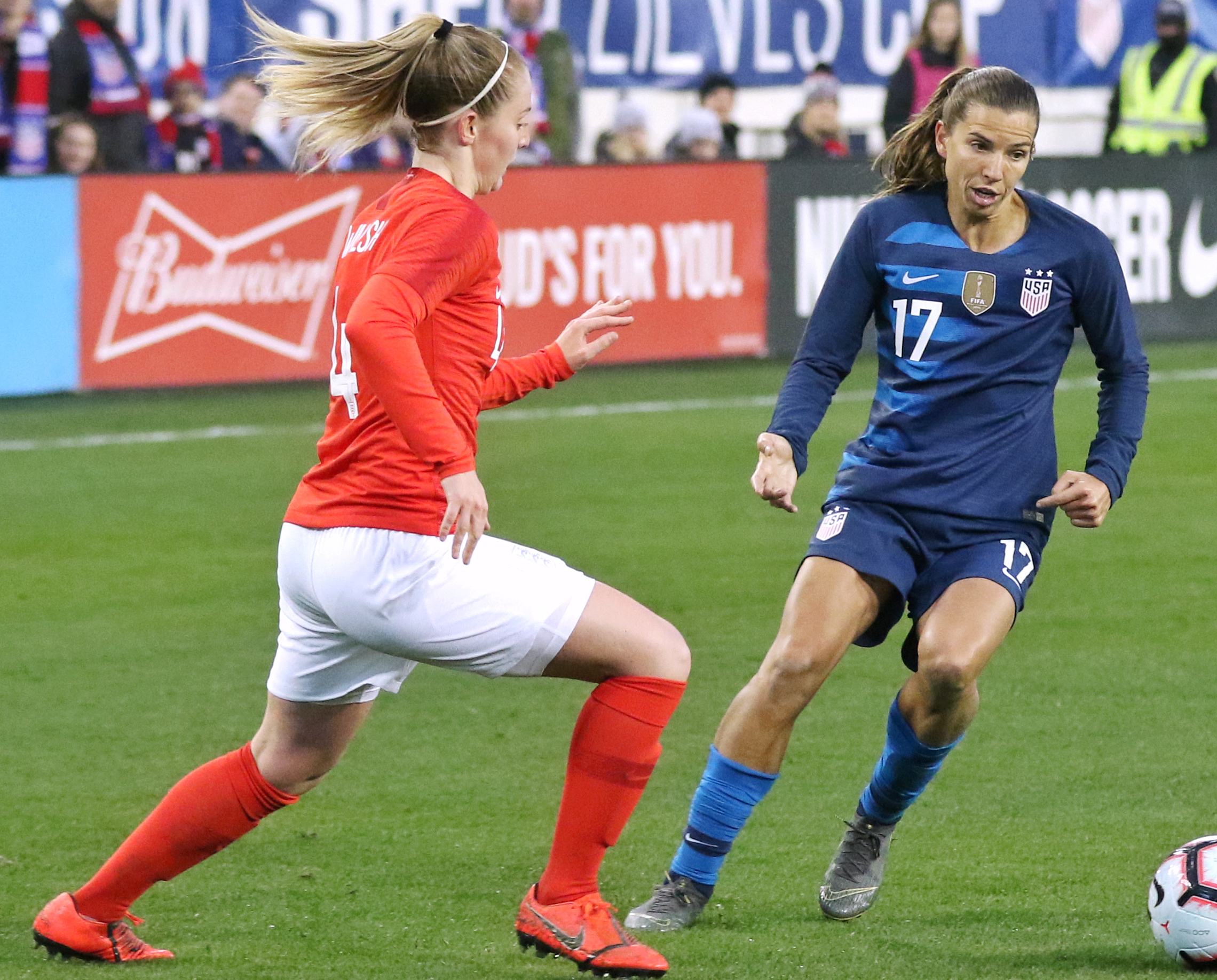
Walsh (left) and Tobin Heath in an England v United States match in 2019

In November 2017, Walsh was called up to the senior England squad for the first time, along with Williamson, by interim coach Marley for the 2019 FIFA Women's World Cup qualification campaign. Before Williamson played in central defence, the two were in contention for the same role, with Walsh preferred; in her early years with the England squad, Walsh was considered the "heir apparent" to Fara Williams as the midfield anchor. Walsh received her first cap on 28 November 2017 in England's match against Kazakhstan, providing an assist in the fifteenth minute, to become the 200th England women's international. Walsh, aged 21 and the youngest player in the squad, captained England for the first time during these qualifiers, starting with the armband in England's final match against Kazakhstan in September 2018, in her seventh senior appearance; England won 6–0. During the campaign she was one of two senior Lionesses (along with eventual winner Beth Mead) to be nominated for the 2018 England Women's International Young Player of the Year award.

Walsh has represented England in three SheBelieves Cup tournaments. The team came second on Walsh's debut appearance in 2018, losing to the United States by an own goal off the keeper. After the match, Walsh and manager Phil Neville had what they called an honest discussion, setting targets for her development over the year and to instill self-confidence. In 2019, England won the competition; Walsh, one of the three players who featured in every match, provided the long-range assist for the final goal and was voted She Kicks player of the match. Jonathan Liew referred to the assist as "That Keira Walsh pass. You've seen the Keira Walsh pass, right?"; it was called the pass of the tournament by BBC Sport. After Walsh's contributions to the team's tournament victory, Neville said that she was probably the best midfielder at the time, praising her development within the squad after he had been tough on her to provoke this. He then encouraged veteran player Karen Carney to help mentor Walsh through the 2019 Women's World Cup, her first major tournament.

==== 2019–22: World Cup 2019, struggles and cementing role ====
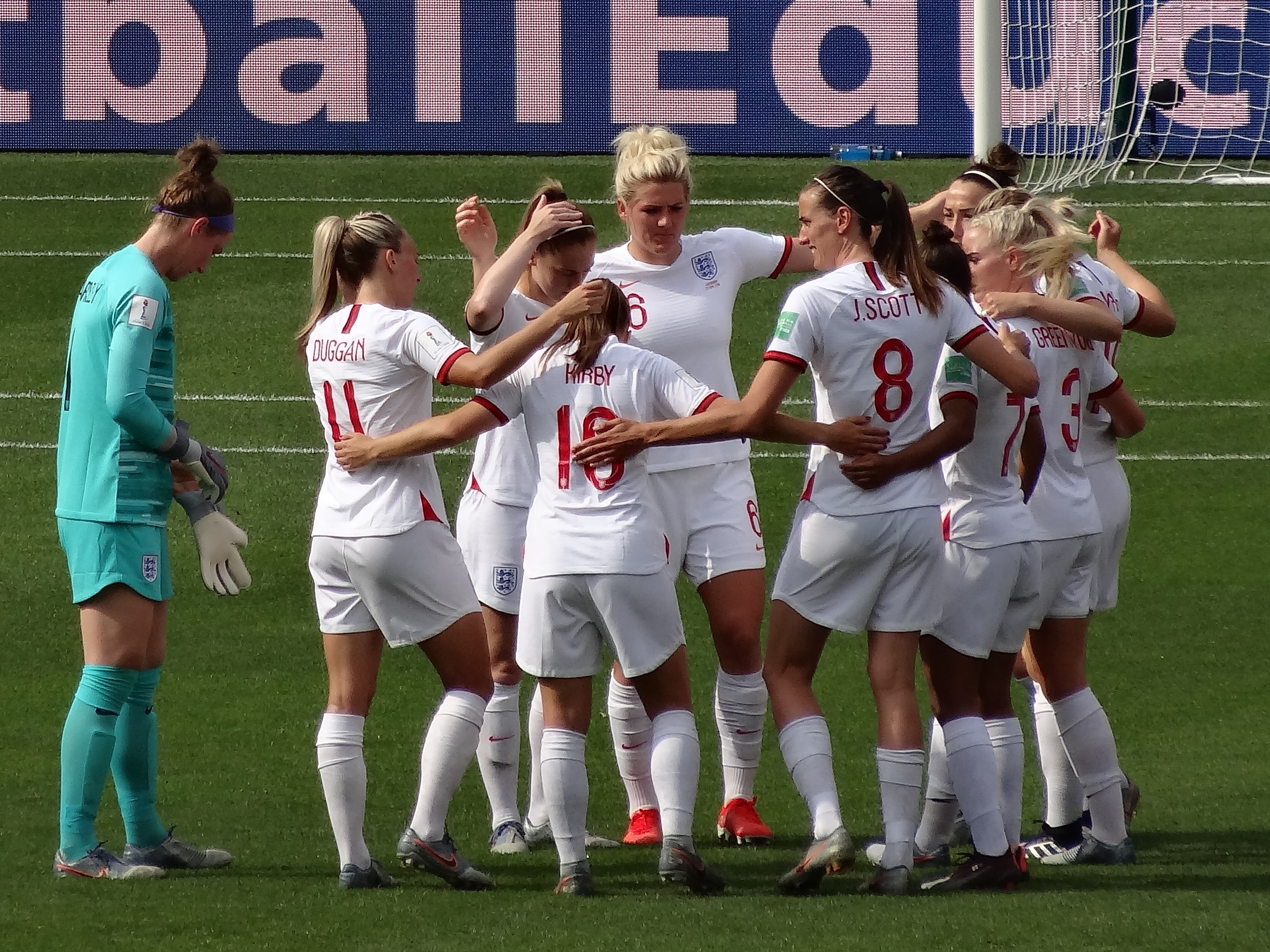
Walsh (third from left) with England at the 2019 World Cup

In May 2019, Walsh was selected as part of England's 2019 World Cup squad. In the opening games of the World Cup, Walsh did not play to her usual standards, but she continued to be picked to start, with Neville having faith in her game and her development; England fans were heavily critical of her continued selection after the early weaker showing, but she performed well in the semi-final against the United States, which England lost. In it, Walsh provided two long passes that produced Ellen White goals (one was disallowed) and sent a narrowly saved powerful strike at goal from 25 yards herself; American goalkeeper Alyssa Naeher's incredible fingertip save was considered her best moment in the tournament. Walsh felt that the criticism of her performances was deserved, saying she lacked focus, but said this did not stop it from affecting her. She considered quitting football because of it, working with psychologists to rebuild her enjoyment of the game.

Still struggling in January 2020, Walsh was encouraged by Neville and England's then-head of performance Dawn Scott to "address her lifestyle habits" so that she could develop further and be able to focus on marginal gains. England came third in the 2020 SheBelieves Cup, held in the United States in March 2020, before returning to England and a match hiatus due to COVID-19 pandemic restrictions. By October 2020, Walsh felt that her mentality was starting to thrive again. At the time, the team were preparing for more international fixtures to return. England's qualification campaign for the 2023 Women's World Cup began in 2021; Walsh missed the middle of 2021 with a calf injury, but returned to be one of four players to captain England during their record 20–0 defeat of Latvia that November. Having faced underwhelming competition in the qualifiers, England took on tougher competition in preparation with the 2022 Arnold Clark Cup in February 2022, which they hosted and won; they retained the trophy a year later.

Since 2019, Walsh has been "an automatic starter for England," said by The Offside Rule to be "a name on the teamsheet that is never questioned". Establishing herself as dependable, she became a regular in the squad "but struggled to impose herself because England weren't built to play her style of football". Walsh became essential when Sarina Wiegman was appointed manager in 2021 and instilled a strong focus on passing quality. Under Wiegman, England's reliance on Walsh grew; sports media and personalities affirmed that her role in the England squad is one that cannot be matched or replicated by other players.

==== 2022–23: Euro 2022, World Cup 2023 and recognition ====
Every time Keira Walsh touched the ball, there was a collective exhale from the 87,192 fans inside Wembley Stadium. Everything was going to be fine.

— Molly Hudson, The Times, about the UEFA Women's Euro 2022 final

In June 2022, Walsh was named to the England squad for the UEFA Women's Euro 2022 in July, which they won. Though ill to the point of requiring a nebuliser before the opening game, Walsh started every match, playing all but five minutes. She showed what Liew described as "classic understated dominance" and was key throughout the tournament, including mounting England's comeback quarter-final win over Spain. In anticipation of the final against Germany it was reported that the outcome of the match could come down to whether Walsh or her contrasting counterpart Lena Oberdorf outperformed the other. (Note: E.g. in The Independent, 90min, GiveMeSport, and The Guardian.) England won 2–1, with Walsh providing the lauded pass for England's first goal scored by Ella Toone in the 62nd minute; The New York Times covered the match by saying it "was Walsh's game". She was named player of the match and was subsequently included in the Team of the Tournament. Considered instrumental in England's victory, and described in the media as the unsung hero of the tournament and her team, other players and the media reacted with surprise when Walsh did not receive a nomination for the Ballon d'Or Féminin in August 2022. (Note: Players: Media:)

External video
- How record breaking Keira Walsh won England the Euros, from BBC Sport via YouTube, 28 December 2022

During the 2022 Euro campaign, Walsh reflected that she was able to perform so consistently because of Wiegman's coaching style allowing Walsh to have a good mindset, that Wiegman "[is] not bothered that we make mistakes. ... She knows that that's part of the process and, for me, that gives me the confidence to try those passes". Walsh repeated the sentiment in a press conference after she was voted player of the match in England's first game after the Euro, a 2–0 win over Austria that saw them qualify for the 2023 World Cup. With her appearance in the final qualification group game, another 10–0 win over Luxembourg on 6 September 2022, Walsh won her 50th England cap. As European champions, England contested the 2023 Women's Finalissima in April 2023, defeating Copa América champions Brazil on penalties to win 1–1 (4–2 (p)), with Walsh being named player of the match.

Walsh was part of the squad for the 2023 FIFA Women's World Cup, which began in July 2023. Early in their second match she suffered a knee injury when winning the ball back; rather than try to directly replace her, England drastically and successfully changed formation for their next match. She suffered ligament damage, though not an ACL injury as many were concerned, and managed to return after missing only one game. The new formation was retained by the squad for most of the tournament, though it limited Walsh, whose creative play was stifled against Nigeria. She was more commanding and influential in the quarter- and semi-final wins over Colombia and Australia, performing reliably to help the Lionesses reach a World Cup final for the first time. In the final, Walsh suffered against Spain's creative midfield, her performance described in The Telegraph as "very poor ... by her standards". England lost 0–1, to finish as runner-up.

An ongoing (though unrelated) injury then meant Walsh missed out on the first two 2023–24 UEFA Women's Nations League matches, in September 2023.

==== 2024–present: Overcoming over-reliance and Euro 2025 ====
As England's playmaker, Walsh had already been specifically targeted by opposition at least as early as 2019, and by 2023, sports media believed Wiegman's over-reliance on her gave opponents a target to subdue. Still considered England's most important and irreplaceable player come January 2025, pundits continued to lament "that coping with the opposition's 'man-marking' of [Walsh] is often the team's main tactical task", criticising the lack of tactical variation in proactively responding to Walsh being marked out as well as the lack of a viable substitute.

Walsh was named vice-captain and served as England captain in 2024, including for the opening match of their Euro 2025 qualifying campaign. During these qualifiers she put in "a world-class performance" for England's victory over the Republic of Ireland, but was sometimes less effective against stronger opponents that continued aiming to stifle her. In England's final group game, which saw them qualify, the team had found ways to overcome the marking of Walsh, including using her as a left-sided centre-back for parts of the match. Walsh made her 80th England appearance in a December 2024 friendly when she replaced Ruby Mace, who had made her debut in the number 4 role as England searched for a Walsh back-up.

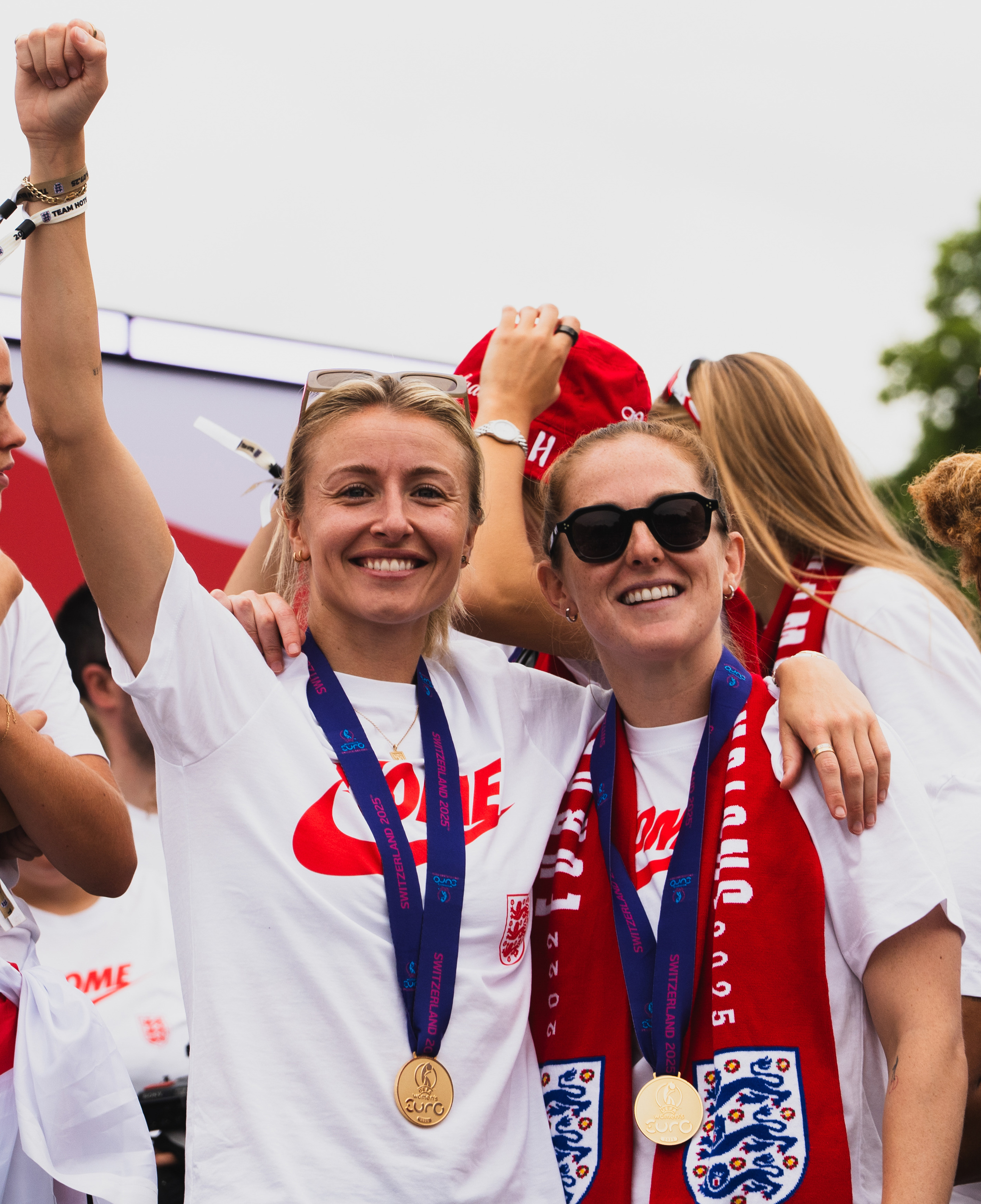
Walsh (right) and Williamson after winning the Euro 2025

On 4 April 2025 and her 83rd England cap, Walsh scored her first international goal in a 5–0 Nations League victory over Belgium. In the match she also created opportunities from the right wing with Mead and Bronze in a "close to faultless" performance that was compared to her 2022 Euro showing. Wiegman said that "[England] want [Walsh] to shoot more [because] she has a very good shot". She obliged later in the year during England's successful title defence at the UEFA Women's Euro 2025, getting forward during the group stage so much that the squad joked she wanted the Golden Boot. She scored England's only goal in their opening match – a poor 1–2 defeat to France that saw her "isolated in midfield" – from her team's first official shot on target in the 87th minute, prompting a late attacking surge. (Note: Walsh had just 0.05 xG for the game, to earn the largest goalscoring overperformance of the UEFA Women's Euro.)

After this match, England reinforced their midfield structure to give Walsh more space and support, and began using other distribution tactics to be less reliant on Walsh and thus less predictable. Still, Miguel Delaney described her performance against Wales, for which she was named player of the match, as "imperious", adding that it showed "all the more obvious that, to stop England, you stop Walsh." As a result of teams more frequently doing this, Walsh was less influential in 2025 than she was in 2022, though was intelligent in how she supported team play instead. Despite being targeted, Walsh "stood her ground" in the knockout stages to be a creative driving force and diligent defender, putting in strong performances in the semi-final and the final that England – Walsh having set up their equaliser – won on penalties.

Walsh, with Williamson injured, was England captain for their homecoming series of friendlies played to celebrate the Euro 2025 victory. The last of these homecoming games was, including appearances for Great Britain, Walsh's 100th international match. Playing Ghana, England fielded an almost entirely changed squad; Walsh remaining in the starting XI led The New York Times to suggest that, despite efforts to build other combinations, she was becoming more vital. In her 100th England game on 14 April 2026, Walsh again captained her country, leading England to a victory over Spain at Wembley. Williamson's continued absence saw Walsh captain the side for the remainder of their 2027 World Cup qualification group matches, losing out on automatic qualification with a large defeat to Spain in Mallorca after which Walsh, though one of England's better players, told the media she "[didn't] have solutions right now. Obviously we'll look back but right now the emotions are very high."

=== Great Britain (2021) ===
Walsh was part of the Great Britain women's football team at the 2020 Summer Olympics held in Tokyo in 2021, making three appearances. Team GB went out in the quarterfinals, losing to the Matildas in a game that saw Walsh play sometimes as an attacking outlet. She took the first shot at goal in the fifth minute, before beating Australian goalkeeper Teagan Micah but hitting the post with a powerful strike in the fifteenth. As the game went to extra time, Walsh again opened striking, with a strong shot from distance tipped over the top of the net by a fingertip save in the 96th minute. A minute later, she was sent forward again, but was unable to score in the match that GB lost 3–4.

== Style of play ==
If this contest at Wembley had been a sailing race, you would not have described Walsh as the best yachtswoman involved, nor the finest boat, but as the wind itself.

— Tom Garry, The Telegraph, in response to 7 October 2022 England 2–1 United States

Walsh plays for possession-based teams. (Note: Though Chelsea is traditionally "far more vertical", they began transitioning to play a possession-based game during the season Walsh joined.) She is typically played as a 'number 6' holding midfielder; "not a traditional holding English midfielder", having instead been described as "built in the mould of a traditional Spanish midfielder", her game has been consistently compared to that of Barcelona and Spain's Sergio Busquets. (Note: By the media, analysts, and commentators.) As has reportedly been said of Busquets, The Athletic wrote that "Walsh is one of those players you might not see if you watch the game—but by watching her you see the game." As a regista (deep-lying playmaker), Walsh typically sets the tempo of matches she plays. Besides technical ability, she is also praised for her stamina and leadership, and composure on the ball.

External video
- Euros winner and Barcelona's Keira Walsh breaks down the perfect pass, Walsh breaks down her game with a masterclass on how to dominate in midfield, including scanning, long-range passes and through balls, from BBC Sport, published via YouTube, 4 June 2023

Walsh is statistically one of the most accurate passers in world football, and most often plays by passing. She is able to execute a large variety of passes equally over all distances and when under pressure, and has a high success rate of long passes into the final third. Her passing skills, and speed of executing them, are considered vital in the transitional phase of play. With her awareness of her teammates' abilities, Walsh can play long passes with good weight towards space for players to run onto and meet well. Walsh also uses passes to set up opportunities for her attacking midfielders; playing alongside Georgia Stanway, she can play to Stanway to attack, as a double pivot, or with their positions swapped. Walsh also often shares the pitch with Lucy Bronze; though Bronze is usually a right-back, she can come into a midfield position for link-up play with Walsh. The pair can also progress the ball into the final third through passing. Walsh may play shorter passes to circulate and retain possession in extended sequences of play before being incisive in shot-creating actions.

Not usually an attacking player, Walsh is able to strike powerfully from distance – "[her] gift is goals from outside the box" – but is instead typically key in her team's build-up play. Like Spanish midfielders, Walsh can use pausing tactics (La Pausa) to her team's advantage, controlling the tempo to manipulate the field of play. She can also disguise her direction, feint passes and make complete turns to break past markers and create space for herself. With her frequent scans of the field, Walsh will make herself open to receive the ball in a good position to retain possession or to use her first touch (which she will often take with the outside of her foot) to get away from pressure. She has been known to receive and distribute balls quickly, too, accurately passing due to her positional awareness. As an often heavily marked player, Walsh can use her movements to "drag opponents around" before passing to openings this has created using her strong vision and range.

When not with the ball, Walsh can be seen dictating direction of play, and moving to support players in possession. She also provides defensive cover, shadowing opposition players to disrupt their play when they have possession and to create space for her teammates to progress in attack when they are on the ball. Walsh is effective in her midfield defensive actions – she is reliable for interceptions and recovering loose ball situations, and is successful if infrequent making tackles – as well as supporting the back line. She will move back to support both when they are defending and to act as a stand-in when a defender moves forward in attack. Walsh often positions behind the ball, to offer defensive protection ahead of the back line. When acquiring the ball during opposition presses, Walsh can break press and switch play to an attacking sequence.

As of 2024, Walsh wears Nike Phantom GX1 boots with a custom-molded upper and a custom insole board that provides a stiffened midfoot and a more-responsive, springier, forefoot.

== Off the pitch ==
=== In culture and the media ===
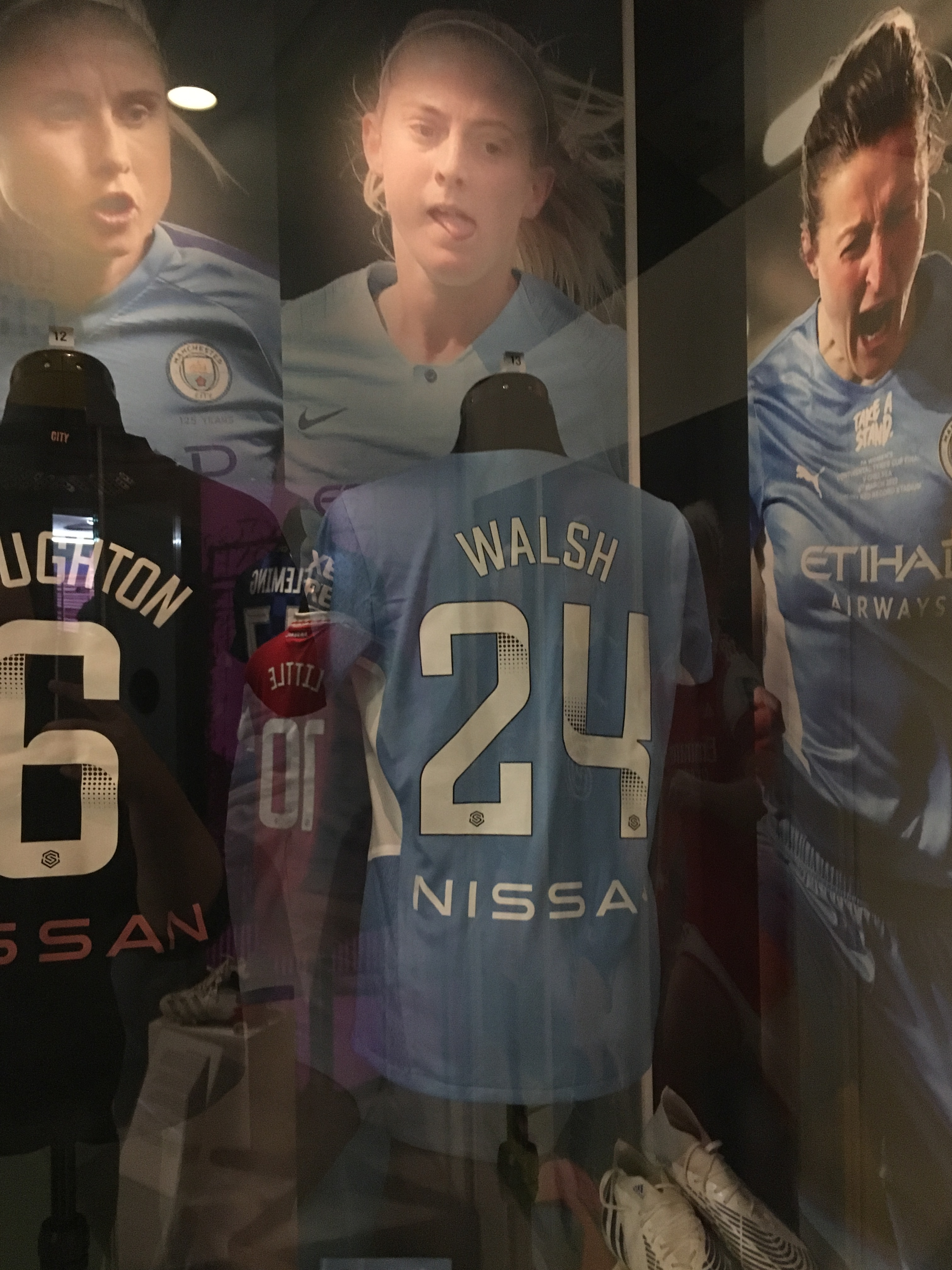
Walsh's 2022 League Cup final shirt displayed at the National Football Museum

Sports media noted that the appreciation of deeper midfielders in the women's game grew significantly following the "trailblazing" work of Walsh and Oberdorf. At the end of 2024, Walsh was still considered the benchmark in her role, with ESPN writing that she "sets the standard for modern defensive midfielders", and in 2026 the Ballon d'Or website wrote that Walsh had come to redefine the number 6 role in the women's game. One of the highest-paid and most marketable women's footballers, Walsh is known to stay out of the spotlight – El País wrote in 2024 that "if Caroline Graham Hansen is silent, Walsh is practically invisible" – but has attracted media attention, especially around her world-record transfer, and used it to inspire young people in her hometown of Rochdale.

She has been nicknamed "WonderWalsh" – referencing the song "Wonderwall", a song associated with Manchester City – and "Baby Ronnie" – referencing Ronaldo, due to her elegance on the ball – and is described as an artist in the game, with promotion of her often linked to artistry. Nike created a marketing campaign saying that "she uses the pitch as a canvas", including projecting an image of Walsh on the facade of the National Gallery in the run-up to the 2022 Euro, and a compilation of her passing was shared by England social media to celebrate World Art Day. Other video clips of Walsh's ball skills have gone viral. A long-range pass she made in the 2019 SheBelieves Cup, taking eight Japan players out of the game to provide the assist, was quickly shared online. Footage of Walsh in a 2022 England training session, in which she scored a solo goal after creatively evading the members of the opposition five-a-side team, was also shared widely, particularly as it coincided with the high-profile Barcelona pursuit of her signing.

In traditional media, Walsh appeared on the final series of both Question of Sport and Soccer AM towards the end of 2022, and wrote guest columns covering the men's 2022 FIFA World Cup for the Evening Standard. Interviewed in the newspaper, she criticised FIFA for going ahead with Qatar as host despite various issues, saying it was "a backwards step" that undermined equality. Since October 2022, the shirt Walsh wore in City's 2022 League Cup victory has been displayed as part of the collection at the National Football Museum. With the England team that won the Euro 2025, Walsh was inducted into the English Football Hall of Fame, housed at the National Football Museum, in 2025. Following her omission as a nominee for the Ballon d'Or in 2022, and despite the organisation's own website describing her as a nominee, Walsh had still not been nominated come 2026, with the media continuing to express their surprise at this.

Walsh received the freedom of the borough of Rochdale on 19 October 2022; a mural of her was installed by Rochdale Borough Council in 2024, and there are buses in the borough named after her. Aware that Rochdale has a negative reputation, Walsh was happy to "show young kids from that area that they can go on to achieve [good] things", as well as hoping to inspire young footballers there. When Walsh was made Member of the Order of the British Empire in the 2026 New Year Honours – nominated by Rochdale MP Paul Waugh – she dedicated it to her home town.

=== Rochdale A.F.C. Girls' Development Centre ===
The Rochdale A.F.C. Community Trust ran the Girls' Development Centre from 2023 to 2026, conceived as a talent inclusion programme when the club was not accepted to operate an Emerging Talent Centre for its girls' teams, and supported by Walsh. She provided football kit and equipment for the centre, and was featured in their branding. The Girls' Development Centre was also featured on Rochdale A.F.C.'s 2024–25 season third kit, an all-white shirt inspired by the England shirts worn by Walsh in her international career. The centre was nominated for the Grassroots Initiative of the Year award at the 2024 Women's Football Awards, and Walsh received the 2025 Women's Football Awards' Inspirational Role Model award for her contributions to the centre. In 2023–24, there were 35 players involved, of which 9 had entered the England pathway by April 2025. At the time the Girls' Development Centre programme was paused in early 2026 to allow Rochdale A.F.C. Ladies to create new development pathways, it had supported 62 players and 7 had progressed to elite England pathways.

=== Personal life ===
Walsh is an advocate for mental health support and breaking the stigma around getting help. She has a West Highland White Terrier called Narla, whom she says helps her switch off. Walsh is an animal lover who is an ambassador of Bleakholt Animal Sanctuary near Rochdale, and has supported Cruelty Free International, which campaigns for the abolition of animal testing. As of 2022, her partner was teammate Lucy Bronze. As of 2024, Walsh is in a relationship with Austrian footballer Laura Feiersinger.

== Career statistics ==
=== Club ===
As of match played 21 November 2026

Appearances and goals by club, season and competition
Club	Season	League			Cup (Note: Includes the Women's FA Cup and Copa de la Reina. References for Manchester City FA Cup appearances by season: 2015, 2017, 2017–18, 2018–19, 2019–20, 2020–21, 2021–22. Appearances are attributed to the season the competition belongs to, including matches postponed due to COVID-19 and played after the season.)		League Cup (Note: Includes the Women's Premier League Cup, WSL Cup/Women's League Cup, and Supercopa de España)		Europe (Note: Includes the UEFA Women's Champions League)		Other (Note: Other competitive appearances)		Total	
Club	Season	Division	Apps	Goals	Apps	Goals	Apps	Goals	Apps	Goals	Apps	Goals	Apps	Goals
Blackburn Rovers	2013–14	WPL Northern	10	3	1	0	0	0	—		1 (Note: Lancashire Women's Challenge Cup)	0	12	3
Manchester City	2014	WSL 1	7	0	0	0	1	0	—		—		8	0
Manchester City	2015	WSL 1	6	0	1	0	4	0	—		—		11	0
Manchester City	2016	WSL 1	8	0	0	0	4	0	4	1	—		16	1
Manchester City	2017	WSL 1	8	0	4	0	—		4	0	—		16	0
Manchester City	2017–18	WSL 1	18	0	3	0	7	0	8	0	—		36	0
Manchester City	2018–19	WSL	19	1	5	1	7	0	2	0	—		33	2
Manchester City	2019–20	WSL	14	2	5	0	5	0	4	0	—		28	2
Manchester City	2020–21	WSL	20	2	4	0	3	0	5	0	1 (Note: Women's FA Community Shield)	0	33	2
Manchester City	2021–22	WSL	18	1	4	0	6	0	0	0	—		28	1
Manchester City	2022–23	WSL	0	0	0	0	0	0	2	0	—		2	0
Manchester City	Total		118	6	26	1	37	0	29	1	1	0	211	8
Barcelona	2022–23	Liga F	26	1	1	0	2	0	9	0	—		38	1
Barcelona	2023–24	Liga F	23	1	3	0	2	0	11	1	—		39	2
Barcelona	2024–25	Liga F	15	2	1	0	2	0	5	1	0 (Note: Copa Catalunya Femenina; Walsh left Barcelona before their first match in the season's competition.)	0	23	3
Barcelona	Total		64	4	5	0	6	0	25	2	0	0	100	6
Chelsea	2024–25	WSL	7	0	3	0	1	0	4	0	—		15	0
Chelsea	2025–26	WSL	20	2	3	0	1	0	7	0	—		31	2
Chelsea	2026–27	WSL	10	2	0	0	—		7	1	—		17	3
Chelsea	Total		37	4	6	0	2	0	18	1	0	0	63	5
Career total			229	17	38	1	45	0	72	4	2	0	386	22

=== International ===
As of match played 13 October 2026

Year	England		Great Britain	
Year	Apps	Goals	Apps	Goals
2017	1	0	—N/a	
2018	8	0	—N/a	
2019	17	0	—N/a	
2020	3	0	—N/a	
2021	5	0	3	0
2022	20	0	—N/a	
2023	15	0	—N/a	
2024	11	0	—N/a	
2025	17	2	—N/a	
2026	8	0	—N/a	
Total	105	2	3	0

Scores and results list England's goal tally first, score column indicates score after each Walsh goal.

List of international goals scored by Keira Walsh
No.	Date	Venue	Cap	Opponent	Score	Result	Competition	Ref.
1	4 April 2025	Ashton Gate, Bristol, England	83	Belgium	5–0	5–0	2025 UEFA Nations League A	
2	5 July 2025	Stadion Letzigrund, Zurich, Switzerland	88	France	1–2	1–2	UEFA Women's Euro 2025	

== Honours ==
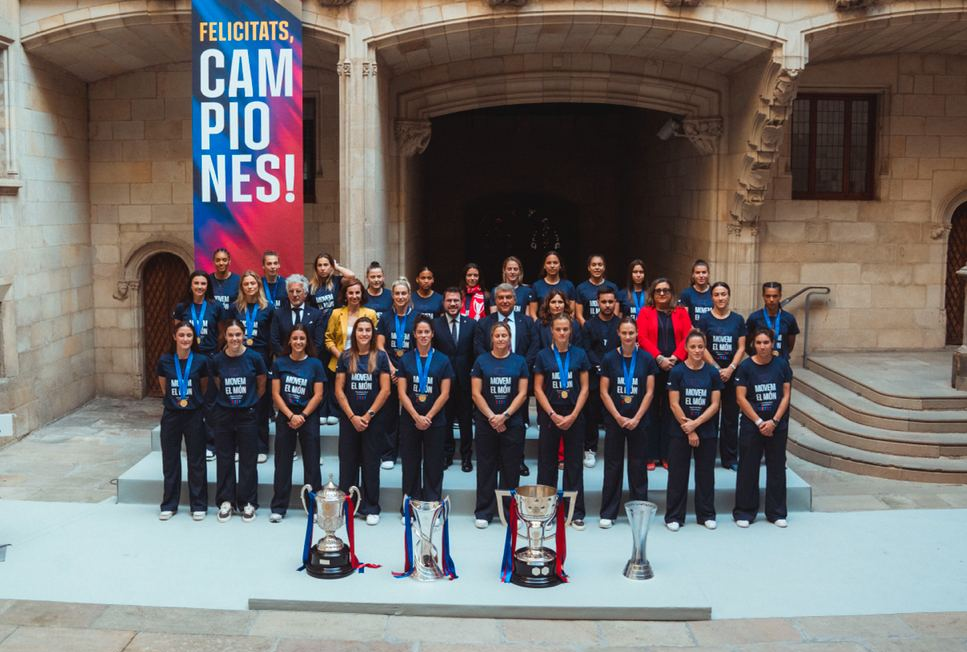
Barcelona, and the four trophies they won in 2023–24, being received by the Catalan president (Walsh is fifth from right, back row)

Blackburn Rovers

- FA Girls' Youth Cup: runner-up 2013
- Lancashire Women's Challenge Cup: runner-up 2014

Manchester City

- FA Women's Super League: 2016
- Women's FA Cup: 2016–17, 2018–19, 2019–20; runner-up: 2021–22
- FA Women's League Cup: 2014, 2016, 2018–19, 2021–22; runner-up: 2017–18

Barcelona

- UEFA Women's Champions League: 2022–23, 2023–24
- Liga F: 2022–23, 2023–24, 2024–25
- Copa de la Reina: 2023–24, 2024–25
- Supercopa de España Femenina: 2022–23, 2023–24, 2024–25

Chelsea

- FA Women's Super League: 2024–25
- Women's FA Cup: 2024–25
- FA Women's League Cup: 2024–25, 2025–26

England

- FIFA Women's World Cup runner-up: 2023
- UEFA Women's Championship: 2022, 2025
- Women's Finalissima: 2023
- SheBelieves Cup: 2019
- Arnold Clark Cup: 2022, 2023

Individual

- Greater Manchester Young Sports Person of the Year: 2008
- Blackburn Rovers Girls' Centre of Excellence Overall Achievement Trophy: 2010
- Blackburn Rovers Girls' Centre of Excellence International Recognition Award: 2010
- UEFA Women's Under-17 Championship Team of the Tournament: 2014
- Blackburn Rovers Ladies' Goal of the Season: 2013–14
- Blackburn Rovers Special Achievement Award: 2014
- Manchester City Women's Rising Star: 2014
- Northwest Football Awards Women's Rising Star: 2017
- Manchester City W.F.C. Official Supporters' Club Player of the Season: 2017–18
- UEFA Women's Championship Team of the Tournament: 2022
- England Women's Player of the Year: third 2021–22
- FIFA FIFPRO Women's World 11: 2022, 2023, 2024
- Women's Football Awards International Player of the Year: 2023
- Women's Football Awards Inspirational Role Model Award: 2025

State and civic honours

- Member of the Order of the British Empire (MBE) for services to association football: 2026 New Year Honours
- Freedom of the City of London (with the England women's national team, 2022)
- Freedom of the borough of Rochdale (2022)
- Medalla d'Honor del Parlament de Catalunya (with FC Barcelona femení, 2023)

Records

- Youngest player to start a match as captain of England in the FA era: 21 years, 149 days (4 September 2018)
- Most expensive women's football player in the world: ~£400,000 (7 September 2022 – 2024)
  - Highest cumulative transfer fees total for a women's football player: ~$1.1 million (31 January 2025 – 10 July 2025)
- Player to achieve the most England women's caps without scoring: 82 (26 February 2025) (Note: Record shared with goalkeeper Rachel Brown-Finnis, who retired after 82 appearances and no goals. Walsh scored on her 83rd cap on 4 April 2025.)

== See also ==
- List of women's footballers with 100 or more international caps
- List of England women's international footballers
- List of Manchester City W.F.C. players
- List of FC Barcelona Femení players
- List of people from Rochdale

== Notes ==
Footnotes

Style of play references
