= Paul Barber (football executive) =

English football executive (born 1967)

Paul Barber OBE
- Born: Paul Barber; 8 April 1967 (age 59); North London
- Occupations: Football administrator and executive
- Known for: Chief Executive and Deputy Chairman of Brighton & Hove Albion

Paul Barber OBE (born 8 April 1967) is an English football administrator, who is the chief executive and deputy chairman of Premier League club Brighton & Hove Albion. He has held senior executive roles at the Football Association, Tottenham Hotspur and the Vancouver Whitecaps. He represents the Premier League on the FA Council and Professional Game Board. Previously, he represented the Football League.

== Management career ==
=== The Football Association ===
As Commercial Director and Director of Marketing and Communications for the Football Association (The FA), Paul Barber created "FA Partners". The FA's sponsorship programme for 1999–2003 secured agreements with a range of sponsors including McDonald's, Pepsi, Carlsberg, Nationwide Building Society, British Airways, The Libyan Government and Umbro. FA Partners linked these sponsors to the England team, the FA Cup, the women's game and grassroots football through The FA Trophy and FA Vase competitions.

Following The FA's decision to re-build Wembley Stadium, Barber was tasked with finding alternative venues for the FA Cup Final and FA Community Shield. Barber created the 'England on the Road' programme, which saw England's senior team play at different English stadiums including Old Trafford, Anfield, White Hart Lane, Stadium of Light, St James's Park, St Mary's Stadium, Pride Park and Villa Park. The FA Cup Final and the FA Community Shield were moved to Cardiff's Millennium Stadium. During the same period, Barber led the development of "englandfans", the FA's official supporters' scheme.

=== Tottenham Hotspur ===
Barber joined Tottenham Hotspur's board in 2005. As executive director reporting to chairman Daniel Levy, Barber was responsible for Tottenham's commercial programme, ticketing and hospitality areas, marketing and brand management, and match day operations. He also acted as the club's main interface with fans' groups. In 2006, Barber concluded Tottenham's then record shirt sponsorship agreement with Asian betting firm Mansion.com. He also agreed a deal with German sportswear firm Puma to supply Tottenham's kit. Barber left Tottenham in 2010 to join the Vancouver Whitecaps. He remained on the board at Tottenham Hotspur as a non-executive director until 2011.

=== Vancouver Whitecaps ===
With the Vancouver Whitecaps, Barber made sponsorship deals with companies including Bell Canada, EA Sports, Budweiser, Kia Motors, BMO Bank of Montreal, Sportsnet, and TEAM 1040 Radio. The Vancouver Whitecaps also became the first MLS club to have all its League and Cup matches broadcast live on TV, radio, mobile and online. He oversaw two stadium moves, culminating in the move to the refurbished BC Place. On-field results led to coaching changes, with Teitur Thordarson being dismissed and replaced by Martin Rennie.

=== Brighton & Hove Albion ===
Barber joined Brighton & Hove Albion as chief executive in 2012. The American Express Community Stadium expanded to a capacity of over 30,000. In his first season, Brighton reached the Championship play-offs and saw increased attendances. Manager Gus Poyet was dismissed. A multi-year sponsorship deal with American Express was announced. Oscar Garcia Junyent and later Sami Hyypia managed the team, before Chris Hughton was appointed. New training facilities were opened. In 2018, Barber was promoted to deputy chairman. Hughton was replaced by Graham Potter and later Roberto de Zerbi. Barber was appointed OBE in 2023.

=== Wider business career ===
Barber served on the board of The Football League and The FA Council. He has held senior executive positions in various companies, including Barclays Bank, Inchcape, Abbey National, Royal & Sun Alliance and Ogilvy & Mather. He has served as a Non-Executive Director for several organizations and is a speaker at sports industry and business conferences.

In 2023, Barber received honorary degree from the University of Sussex.
