= Susan Whelan (executive) =

Irish executive

CEO of Leicester City
- In office 2010–2025

Personal details
- Born: c. 1964 (age 61–62) Dublin, Ireland

Susan Valerie Whelan OBE (born c. 1964) is an Irish executive who is the former CEO of Leicester City.

== Career ==
Whelan worked for English Premier League side Leicester City from 2010 until 2025. She was CEO when the club won the league in 2016.
