= Mills & Reeve =

British law firm

Mills & Reeve LLP
- Headquarters: London, United Kingdom
- No. of offices: 7
- No. of lawyers: 871
- No. of employees: 1507
- Major practice areas: Built environment, Charities and social enterprise, Education, Energy and infrastructure, Food and agribusiness, Government, Health and care, Insurance, Life sciences, Private wealth, Sport, entertainment and media, Technology
- Key people: Charles Staveley (Senior Partner); Claire Clarke (Managing Partner)
- Revenue: £206.9 million (2025/26)
- Profit per equity partner: £495,000 (2023/24)
- Date founded: 1789 (Francis & Co); 1880 (Mills & Reeve)
- Company type: Limited liability partnership
- Website: mills-reeve.com

Mills & Reeve LLP is a law firm headquartered in London. It has offices in Birmingham, Cambridge, Leeds, Manchester, Norwich and Oxford. It is the UK's 39th largest law firm measured by 2023/24 revenues. The firm has been listed in The Sunday Times Best Places to Work as one of the best big organisations. They were also commended for being awarded Platinum Investors in People Status, joining a select club of only 6% of 50,000 assessed organisations awarded this coveted status.

== History ==
The firm's roots can be traced back to 1789 when the practice which was eventually to become Francis & Co was started in Cambridge by the 24-year-old newly qualified solicitor Christopher Pemberton. The original Mills & Reeve was formed in Norwich in 1880 when Henry Mills and Edmund Reeve came together to undertake the legal work arising out of the development of the tram system in Norwich.

The current Mills & Reeve practice was formed in 1987 by the merger of the Norwich-based Mills & Reeve and the Cambridge-based Francis & Co, forming Mills & Reeve Francis.

In 2013, Mills & Reeve merged with Manchester-based law firm George Davies and in 2017 merged with London firm Maxwell Winward.

In 2014, Mills & Reeve formed an exclusive "best friends" alliance with the French law firm Fidal.

== Clients ==
Mills & Reeve’s clients include the Department of Health and Social Care, Macmillan Cancer Support, the Wellcome Trust, Trinity College Cambridge, the British Council, plus more.

The firm’s recent successes have included advising:

- Cole Palmer on an application to trademark his celebration and nickname for brand development and protection purposes.
- The issuing of three significant judgements in the Court of Protection, enabling lawful withdrawal of life-sustaining treatment where there is an Advance Decision to Refuse Treatment created by a patient. (Re AB: Validity and Applicability, 2025)
- The University of Sussex in its successful appeal against a record £585,000 fine for breaching free speech regulations. The court ruling determined that the Office for Students had ‘closed its mind’ when issuing the fine, in a case brought by former professor Kathleen Stock.
- London’s Natural History Museum on a landmark ruling to reduce its annual rental value from £12.92 million to just £1. The Valuation Tribunal ruled that, given the NHM is free to the public, it shouldn’t be assessed as a profitable commercial property.
- The University of York on establishing a new campus in Mumbai, India.
- The University of Cambridge on the creation of the new IonQ Quantum Innovation Centre and long-term research programme at the University’s Cavendish Laboratory.

Mills & Reeve also extends their services internationally through M&R Global. They utilise their network of local experts across over 100 jurisdictions, forgoing fixed offices in favour of a more fluid international approach. 30% of their total revenue is now derived from international projects.

== Awards ==
Mills & Reeve ranked 33rd in the FT Innovative Lawyers Europe list in 2022, with their efforts towards diversity and inclusion emphasised in the ranking. Their “Fearless Feedback” scheme revealed a client recommendation rate of 91% in the same year, increased from 89% in 2021, and was judged as standout in the innovation strategy category of the FT ranking 2022.

In 2026, Mills & Reeve was commended in the dealmaking category at the FT Innovative Lawyers Europe Awards 2026 for their role in advising the University of Kent on its landmark merger with the University of Greenwich.

The firm has ranked in the top five of RollOnFriday’s Best Law Firms to Work at list for the past eight years. It was awarded third in 2024.

A learning platform created by Mills & Reeve in 2024 to enable FIFA football agents to pass their compulsory exam was commended in the best client service innovation award at The Lawyer Awards 2024.

Mills & Reeve has been rated a leading UK firm in the Chambers 2027 ranking, with 61 ranked departments and 140 ranked individuals.

== Thought leadership ==
Many of Mills & Reeve’s employees are leaders in their respective fields, contributing to original research and insight. The firm seeks to support this ambition through its recent emphasis on thought leadership, such as the FemHealth Focus series of reports spotlighting the need to improve health policy and solve women’s health inequalities through investment and data collection.

Mills & Reeve is responsible for the My Name, My Face campaign, launched in 2026 in response to the steep increase in the use of Generative AI to create deepfake images and videos. The campaign calls on the UK government to enact new legislation protecting people’s likenesses from unauthorised use. Although the campaign is aimed at all adults, several celebrities have lent their support to the cause, including Cole Palmer, Lucy Bronze, Kyle Walker, Gary Anderson and Tan France.

In late 2026, Mills & Reeve launched the Achieving More Together podcast. Hosted by Juliet Mann, the podcast features a new guest every episode, exploring the mindsets and habits that form high-performing teams. From Formula One teams and military operations to AI innovation, leadership, governance and business strategy, the podcast spans across organisations to unite high performers through dedication to success and teamwork.
