= Victoire Cogevina Reynal =

Argentine and American businesswoman

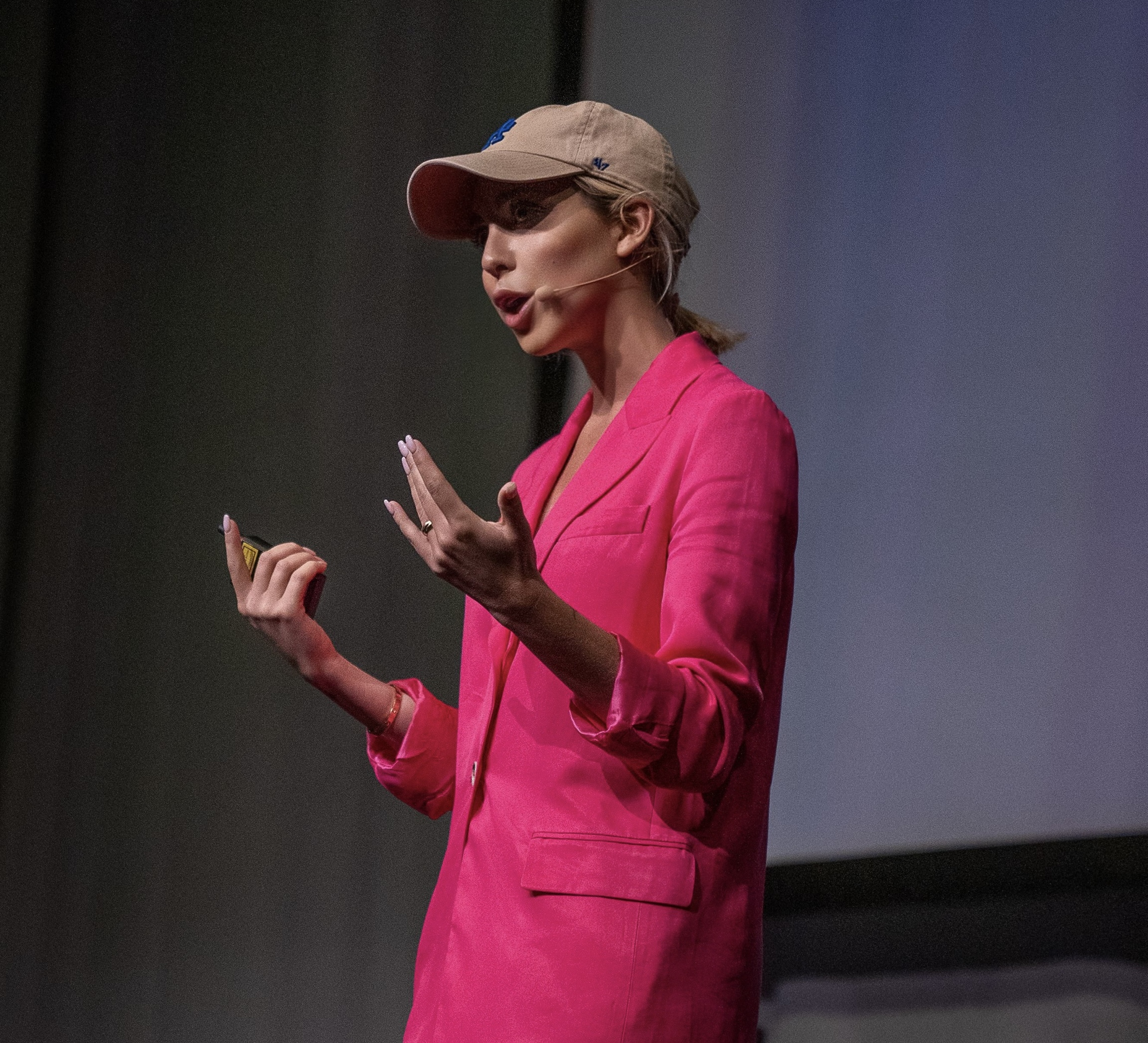
- Victoire Cogevina Reynal in 2021
- Born: Victoire H. Cogevina Reynal; Boston, US
- Occupation: Businesswoman
- Website: www.mercury13.com

Victoire Cogevina Reynal is an Argentine and American businesswoman. With the Venezuelan entrepreneur Mario Malavé, she is the co-founder and co-CEO of Mercury 13, an investment group in women's football teams. She was the vice president of women's football at OneFootball. During her professional career, she co-founded Gloria, a start-up that counted itself in the 2% of Silicon Valley companies led by women and sold in September 2022. She has been speaker in many conferences about women, technology and sport.

Currently based in London, she is acknowledged as one of the Latin American women that are redefining the football industry globally. She co-founded the first sport agency managed only by women and is an activist for gender equality with UN Women and is part of the Member board of directors of Women in Sports Tech –from where she boosts the career of students and young professionals in traditionally male controlled fields, like technology and sport.

== Personal life ==
Victoire Cogevina Reynal was born in Boston, United States and shortly afterwards her family moved to Argentina where she grew up going to the general grandstand of the Avellaneda stadium to support her football team: Racing Club. She is the daughter of Greek Ambassador Alexis Cogevinas and Argentinian FIFA agent Shalimar Reynal. During her childhood and adolescence, she lived in Boston, New York, London, Paris and Buenos Aires. Her grandfather is William Reynal, founder of Austral Lineas Aereas, Sol Jet and the first ski resorts of Argentina: Catedral and Chapelco. In May 2023, she married French and British professional poker player Philippe Souki, with whom she has a daughter.

== Career ==
In January 2015, Victoire founded SR ALL Stars, a US-based football agency representing elite LATAM professional players into the MLS and one of the few sport agencies led only by women. In addition to planning the corporate structure of the company, she led the Image and Public Relations department. She worked with several teams and players of MLS, EPL and Serie A; she grew the players social media presence, led the source sponsorship and endorsement deals and created corporate social responsibility (CSR) programs. In all those years, she opened up discussions on male chauvinism and the lack of transparency in the football industry, she became a spokesperson for those causes and she became a referent for women in the media of Latin America, Europe and the United States.

Three years later, she started her own project and pushed forward the development of Gloria Football with the help of investors and her co-founder, Matias Castello, a fellow Argentine football fan and previous Head of Partnership Product at Facebook. In September 2022, the media company OneFootball announced the acquisition of the Gloria app and Cogevina's appointment as Vice President of Women's Football.

In 2023, she announced the formation of the Mercury/13 trust; a multi-club ownership group focused on acquiring controlling stakes in professional women's football teams in Europe and Latin America, with a capital of more than $100 million. The group made the acquisition of the Italian club Como Women from Italy's Serie A, one of the first women's clubs in Italy.

On September 18, 2025, Mercury/13 has acquired a majority stake in Bristol City Women.

On February 25, 2026, she announced her departure from Mercury/13.

== Social commitment in gender gap ==
Being a woman in sports tech, Cogevina is an advocate for gender equality in sports. She currently serves as a United Nations Women speaker fighting for gender equality in football and advocating for female footballers and professionals in the industry. She is also sharing her professional and advocacy experience with the Women in Sports Tech (WIST) team and fellows. As an entrepreneur, her mission is to support the organization in two areas: boosting growth opportunities for other women throughout the sports tech and innovation landscape, informing about the wide array of career path possibilities in the industry for middle and high school young women.

Cogevina joined Nadia Nadim and the city's mayor of Louisville, Kentucky, Greg Fischer, with the aim of starting a campaign for raising money to support resettlement of Afghan women.

== Conferences ==
Cogevina has been a speaker at many conferences on sport (33), technology and gender (35).

- SoccerEx (Miami, United States)
- NHSA (Chicago, United States)
- Leadership Women Football (Madrid, Spain)
- Microsoft #CreateStartUp (London, England)
- AdWeek Conference (New York, United States)
- World Football Summit (Worldwide)
- South by Southwest – SXSW (Austin, United States)
- Superliga Argentina Fútbol (Buenos Aires, Argentina)
- Athens Women's Football Summit (Athens, Greece)
- World Football Summit 2023 (Sevilla, Spain)
- Web Summit 2023 (Lisbon, Portugal)
