= Debbie Hewitt =

British businesswoman

Debbie Hewitt MBE
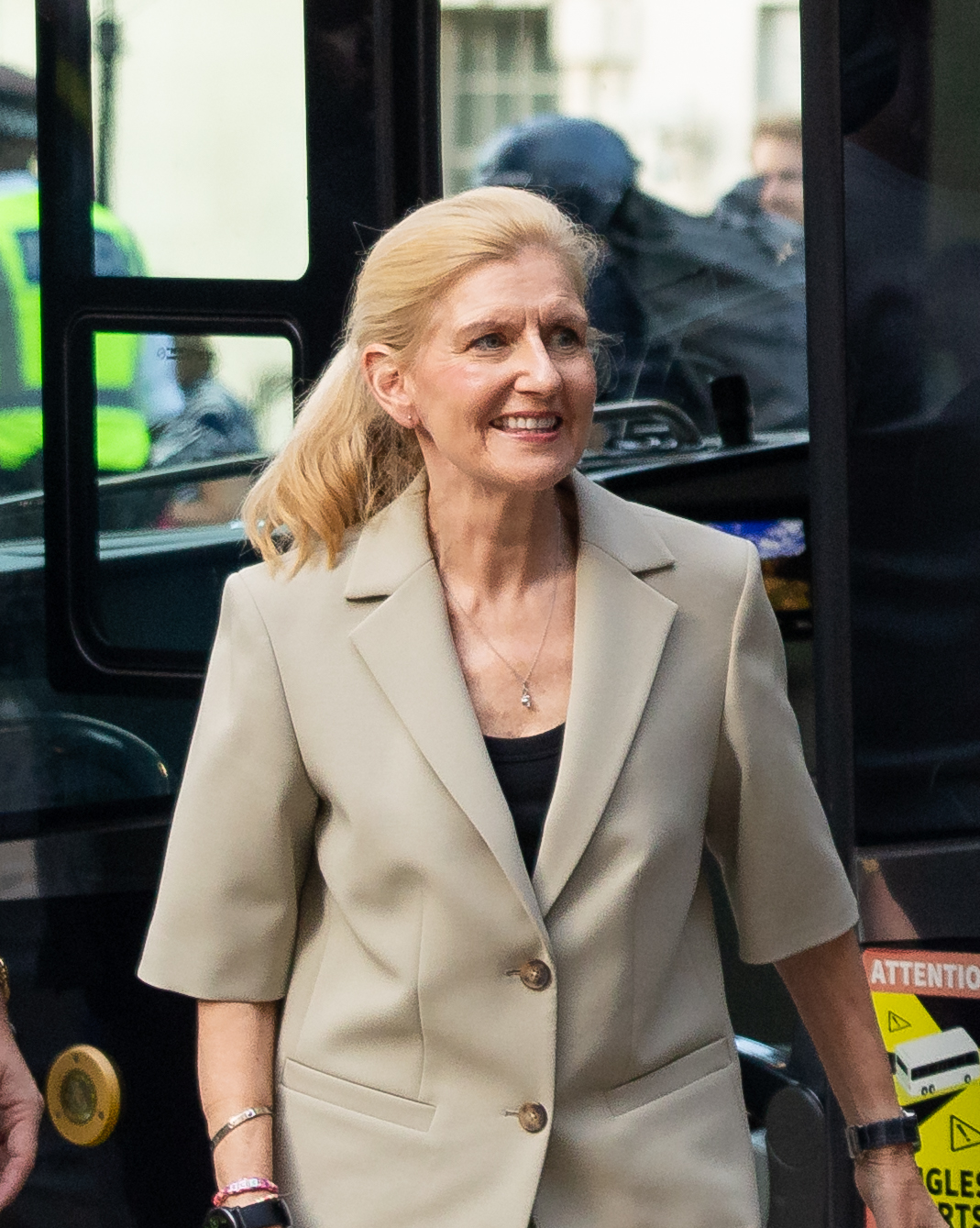
- Hewitt in 2025
- Born: 31 August 1963 (age 62)
- Education: University of Bath
- Occupation: Businesswoman
- Title: Chairwoman The Football Association (FA)
- Term: January 2022–
- Spouse: Paul Hewitt
- Children: 2

Alison Deborah Moira Hewitt MBE (born 31 August 1963) is a British businesswoman and sports administrator. She was appointed as chair of the Football Association in June 2021, taking up the role in January 2022. Hewitt is the first woman to hold the post. Hewitt was previously chairwoman of The Restaurant Group.

== Early life ==
Alison Deborah Moira Hewitt was born on 31 August 1963 and grew up in Nottinghamshire. While studying for her A-levels, her mother died. Her grandfather, Dr Vivian Brackstone, received an MBE for saving the lives of his fellow prisoners-of-war in a Japanese prison camp.

== Career ==
Hewitt did not initially go to university, and began her career on a Marks & Spencer management training scheme. She later joined Lex where she managed a Volvo dealership in Bristol; Lex sponsored her MBA from the University of Bath, which she completed part-time from 1992 to 1995. She was chief executive officer of the RAC (which was part of the Lex group) from 2006 until 2008.

Since 2018, Hewitt has been the non-executive chairman of BGL Group. She is also non-executive chair of Visa Europe and White Stuff. In the 2011 New Year Honours, Hewitt was appointed a Member of the Order of the British Empire (MBE) "for services to business and to the public sector."

In 2021, she was voted in by a unanimous decision of the seven-member selection panel to become the first chairwoman of the FA, following the resignation of Greg Clarke in 2020. The FA Council ratified the decision in its 22 July 2021 meeting. She announced that she would step down as chair of the Restaurant Group at the end of 2021.

== Personal life ==
Hewitt is married to Paul Hewitt, former finance director at the RAC, and they have twins. She is a life-long Liverpool fan and lives in Cheshire. She is a parish councillor on the Hough and Chorlton Parish Council.
