= Football at the 2022 Bolivarian Games =

Football competitions at the 2022 Bolivarian Games

- Football pictogram
- Venue: Estadio Armando Maestre Pavajeau
- Dates: 26 June – 5 July 2022
- Competitors: 144 from 6 nations
- Teams: 8 (4 boys and 4 women)

Champions
- Men: Paraguay
- Women: Colombia

Football competitions at the 2022 Bolivarian Games in Valledupar, Colombia were held from 26 June to 4 July 2022 at the Estadio Armando Maestre Pavajeau.

Two medal events were scheduled to be contested: a boys' and women's tournament. A total of 144 athletes (72 per gender and 4 teams per event) will compete in the events. The boys' tournament is restricted to under-17 players while the women's tournament is restricted to under-20 players.

Hosts Colombia, who were the defending gold medalists in both boys' and women's tournaments, managed to retain its title in the women's tournament but failed in the men's event after finishing third. Paraguay won the gold medal in the men's tournament.

== Participating nations ==
A total of 6 nations (4 ODEBO nations and 2 invited) registered teams for the football event. Each nation was able to enter a maximum of 36 athletes (one team of 18 athletes per gender). Hosts Colombia and Paraguay will participate in both events. Bolivia and Dominican Republic will participate in the boys' tournament, while Panama and Venezuela will participate in the women's tournament.

- Bolivia (18 athletes)
- Colombia (36)
- Dominican Republic (18)
- Panama (18)
- Paraguay (36)
- Venezuela (18)

== Venue ==
All matches in both events were played at Estadio Armando Maestre Pavajeau in Valledupar.

Valledupar	Valledupar is located in Colombia
Estadio Armando Maestre Pavajeau	Valledupar is located in Colombia
Capacity: 14,000	Valledupar is located in Colombia

== Medal summary ==
=== Medal table ===
* Host nation (Host nation)

Rank	Nation	Gold	Silver	Bronze	Total
1	Paraguay	1	1	0	2
2	Colombia*	1	0	1	2
3	Bolivia	0	1	0	1
4	Venezuela	0	0	1	1
Totals (4 entries)		2	2	2	6

=== Medalists ===
Event	Gold	Silver	Bronze
Boys' tournament	Paraguay (PAR); Facundo Insfrán; Ezequiel Sánchez; Lucas Ramírez; Iván Morel; Nicolás Caballero; Ángel Billordo; Alan Cano; Cristhofer Maqueda; Aarón Páez; Paulo Riveros; Gabriel Aguayo; Jesús Peralta; Kevin Schupp; Thiago Agüero; Alan Romero; Fernando Viveros; Juan Alfonzo; Enzo Agüero	Bolivia (BOL); Fabián Pereira; Marcio Arévalo; Samir Pérez; Carlos Medina; Fabio Zamora; Diego Arroyo; Anthony Saavedra; Matías Castro; Deybi Choque; Santiago Melgar; Axel Salazar; Guilmar Centella; Gonzalo Mendoza; Lucas Castedo; Juan José González; Marcelo De Lima; Yeferson Mamani; Misael Alcócer	Colombia (COL); Andrés Tovar; Simón García; Alberto Higgins; Andrés Alfonso; Nicola Profeta; Sebastián Cortés; Óscar Perea; Andrés Gutiérrez; Hilder Arboleda; Jordan Barrera; Fáver Aragón; Alexei Rojas; Juan José Díaz; Juan José Obando; Rafael Mercado; Élver Arizala; Jafé Pérez; Richardson Rivas
Women's tournament	Colombia (COL); Natalia Giraldo; Mary José Álvarez; Ángela Barón; Yunaira López; Stefanía Perlaza; Ilana Izquierdo; Gisela Robledo; María Camila Reyes; Mariana Muñoz; Liced Serna; Gabriela Rodríguez; Valentina González; Ana María Guzmán; Yirleidis Quejada; Mariana Zamorano; Juana Ortegón; Wendy Bonilla; Ingrid Guerra	Paraguay (PAR); Luana Rodríguez; Hannah Núñez; Sofía Almirón; Gabriela Valdez; Fiorela Martínez; Fredesvinda Ocampos; Cindy Ramos; Fiona Zaracho; Belén Riveros; Erika Cartaman; Nabila Perruchino; Araceli Leguizamón; Valeria Benítez; Naomi De León; Yanina Servín; Pamela Villalba; Agustina Varela; Milagros Rolón	Venezuela (VEN); Hilary Azuaje; Fabiola Solórzano; Floriangel Apóstol; María Duerto; Zulaycar Milano; Ana Paula Fraiz; Nerimar Infante; Alai Araújo-Elorza; Kimberlyn Campos; Jaimar Torrealba; Daniela Martínez; Ashley Pulgar; Isabella Tabja; Naileth Rangel; Alexineth Rosario; María Contreras; Iraia Arrue; Victoria de Abreu

== Boys' tournament ==
2022 Bolivarian Games Boys' Football tournament
Tournament details
- Host country: Colombia
- City: Valledupar
- Dates: 2–4 July 2022
- Teams: 4 (from 2 confederations)
- Venue(s): 1 (in 1 host city)

Final positions
- Champions: Paraguay
- Runners-up: Bolivia
- Third place: Colombia
- Fourth place: Dominican Republic

Tournament statistics
- Matches played: 6
- Goals scored: 26 (4.33 per match)
- Top scorer(s): 8 players (2 goals each)

The boys' tournament was held from 2 to 4 July 2022 and consisted of a single group of 4 teams in which each team played once against the other 3 teams in the group on a single round-robin basis. The top three teams were awarded gold, silver and bronze medals respectively.

=== Standings ===
Pos	Team	Pld	W	D	L	GF	GA	GD	Pts	Final result
1	Paraguay	3	3	0	0	8	5	+3	9	Gold medal
2	Bolivia	3	2	0	1	7	3	+4	6	Silver medal
3	Colombia (H)	3	1	0	2	5	3	+2	3	Bronze medal
4	Dominican Republic	3	0	0	3	6	15	−9	0	Fourth place

Source: Bolivarianos Valledupar 2022
Rules for classification: Tie-breakers
(H) Hosts

=== Matches ===
2 July 2022
16:00

Dominican Republic	1–5	Bolivia
Cuello 2'	Report	Roces 8' (o.g.); Centella 13' (pen.); Saavedra 35'; De Lima 43' (pen.), 51'

Estadio Armando Maestre Pavajeau
Referee: Keiner Jiménez (Colombia)
2 July 2022
19:00

Colombia	0–1	Paraguay
	Report	Cano 76' (pen.)

Estadio Armando Maestre Pavajeau
Referee: Bismark Santiago (Colombia)

3 July 2022
16:00

Paraguay	5–4	Dominican Republic
Maqueda 19'; Páez 35'; Viveros 51', 90+1'; Agüero 58'	Report	Cuello 65'; Cruz 78' (pen.); Mañón 83'; Corcino 90+2'

Estadio Armando Maestre Pavajeau
Referee: Bismark Santiago (Colombia)
3 July 2022
19:00

Colombia	0–1	Bolivia
	Report	Alcócer 86'

Estadio Armando Maestre Pavajeau
Referee: Keiner Jiménez (Colombia)

4 July 2022
16:00

Colombia	5–1	Dominican Republic
Perea 12'; Alfonso 19'; Mercado 40', 55'; Arboleda 65'	Report	Cruz 89'

Estadio Armando Maestre Pavajeau
Referee: Keiner Jiménez (Colombia)
4 July 2022
19:00

Bolivia	1–2	Paraguay
Centella 31'	Report	Cano 52'; Páez 78'

Estadio Armando Maestre Pavajeau
Referee: Bismark Santiago (Colombia)

=== Goalscorers ===
There were 26 goals scored in 6 matches, for an average of 4.33 goals per match.

2 goals

- (Bolivia) Guilmar Centella
- (Bolivia) Marcelo De Lima
- (Colombia) Rafael Mercado
- (Dominican Republic) Nicolás Cruz
- (Dominican Republic) Emmanuel Cuello
- (Paraguay) Alan Cano
- (Paraguay) Aarón Páez
- (Paraguay) Fernando Viveros

1 goal

- (Bolivia) Misael Alcócer
- (Bolivia) Anthony Saavedra
- (Colombia) Andrés Alfonso
- (Colombia) Hilder Arboleda
- (Colombia) Óscar Perea
- (Dominican Republic) Alejandro Corcino
- (Dominican Republic) Bryan Mañón
- (Paraguay) Cristhian Maqueda
- (Paraguay) Enzo Agüero

1 own goal

- (Dominican Republic) Javier Roses (against Bolivia)

Source: Bolivarianos Valledupar 2022

== Women's tournament ==
2022 Bolivarian Games Women's Football tournament
Tournament details
- Host country: Colombia
- City: Valledupar
- Dates: 26–28 June 2022
- Teams: 4 (from 2 confederations)
- Venue(s): 1 (in 1 host city)

Final positions
- Champions: Colombia (4th title)
- Runners-up: Paraguay
- Third place: Venezuela
- Fourth place: Panama

Tournament statistics
- Matches played: 6
- Goals scored: 17 (2.83 per match)
- Top scorer(s): (Colombia) Ilana Izquierdo (Colombia) Gisela Robledo (Colombia) Gabriela Rodríguez (3 goals each)

The women's tournament was held from 26 to 28 June 2022 and consisted of a single group of 4 teams in which each team played once against the other 3 teams in the group on a single round-robin basis. The top three teams were awarded gold, silver and bronze medals respectively.

=== Standings ===
Pos	Team	Pld	W	D	L	GF	GA	GD	Pts	Final result
1	Colombia (H)	3	3	0	0	11	1	+10	9	Gold medal
2	Paraguay	3	1	1	1	3	4	−1	4	Silver medal
3	Venezuela	3	1	1	1	2	3	−1	4	Bronze medal
4	Panama	3	0	0	3	1	9	−8	0	Fourth place

Source: Bolivarianos Valledupar 2022
Rules for classification: Tie-breakers
(H) Hosts

=== Matches ===
26 June 2022
16:00

Paraguay	0–0	Venezuela
	Report

Estadio Armando Maestre Pavajeau
Attendance: 10,000
Referee: Vanessa Ceballos (Colombia)
26 June 2022
19:00

Colombia	4–1	Panama
Izquierdo 1'; Robledo 10' (pen.), 72'; Serna 23'	Report	Atencio 4'

Estadio Armando Maestre Pavajeau
Attendance: 10,000
Referee: Paula Fernández (Colombia)

27 June 2022
16:00

Panama	0–2	Venezuela
	Report	Campos 20'; Contreras 46'

Estadio Armando Maestre Pavajeau
Referee: Paula Fernández (Colombia)
27 June 2022
19:00

Colombia	4–0	Paraguay
Izquierdo 24'; Robledo 35' (pen.); Serna 52'; Rodríguez 68'	Report

Estadio Armando Maestre Pavajeau
Referee: Vanessa Ceballos (Colombia)

28 June 2022
16:00

Paraguay	3–0	Panama
Villalba 3'; Ramos 8'; Perruchini 90+3'	Report

Estadio Armando Maestre Pavajeau
Attendance: 11,000
Referee: Vanessa Ceballos (Colombia)
28 June 2022
20:10

Colombia	3–0	Venezuela
Izquierdo 13'; Rodríguez 25', 37'	Report

Estadio Armando Maestre Pavajeau
Attendance: 11,000
Referee: Paula Fernández (Colombia)

=== Goalscorers ===
There were 17 goals scored in 6 matches, for an average of 2.83 goals per match.

3 goals

- (Colombia) Ilana Izquierdo
- (Colombia) Gisela Robledo
- (Colombia) Gabriela Rodríguez

2 goals

- (Colombia) Liced Serna

1 goal

- (Paraguay) Nabila Perruchini
- (Paraguay) Cindy Ramos
- (Paraguay) Pamela Villalba
- (Panama) Yasli Atencio
- (Venezuela) Kimberlyn Campos
- (Venezuela) María Contreras

Source: Bolivarianos Valledupar 2022
