= International competitions in women's association football =

This article lists all international competitions in women's football (soccer). The competitions included are for national teams as well as club sides. Competitions past and present are included. Some competitions may not be directly run by the governing body for the region.

For domestic competitions see the article Women's football around the world.

The inaugural FIFA Women's World Cup tournament was held in November 1991 after the experimental FIFA Women's Invitation Tournament in 1988 inspired by three classic Women's competitions in the 70's and 80's: FIEFF Women's World Cup organized by FIEFF the 1st World Women's Football Governing Body and the invitational tournaments such as Women's World Invitational Tournament and International Ladies Football Festival.

== Women's competitions ==
Governing body	Women's national team Competitions	Women's national Olympic team competitions	Women's national youth team competitions	Women's club competitions
World (FIFA)	FIFA Women's World Cup; FIFA International Women's Football Tournament; FIEFF Women's World Cup; CONMEBOL - UEFA Women's Finalissima	Olympic Games Women's Football Tournament	FIFA U-20 Women's World Cup; FIFA U-17 Women's World Cup	FIFA Women's Club World Cup; FIFA Women's Champions Cup
World (Invitational)	Women's World Invitational Tournament; International Ladies Football Festival		Universiade Women's Football Tournament	International Women's Football Tournament; International Women's Club Championship; Women's International Champions Cup
Europe (UEFA)	UEFA Women's Championship; UEFA Women's Nations League; FIEFF European Competition for Women's Football		UEFA Women's Under-19 Championship; UEFA Women's Under-17 Championship	UEFA Women's Champions League; UEFA Women's Europa Cup; Nordic Women's Championship; Women's Baltic Football League
South America (CONMEBOL)	CONMEBOL Copa América Femenina; South American Games Women's Football Tournament	Pan American Games Women's Football Tournament; Central American and Caribbean Games Women's Football Tournament	CONMEBOL Sudamericano Sub-20 Femenino; CONMEBOL Sudamericano Sub-17 Femenino	Copa Libertadores Femenina; Campeonato Sudamericano de Fútbol Femenino
Central & North America, & Caribbean (CONCACAF)	CONCACAF W Championship; CONCACAF W Gold Cup; Central American Games Women's Football Tournament	Pan American Games Women's Football Tournament; Central American and Caribbean Games Women's Football Tournament	CONCACAF Women's U-20 Championship; CONCACAF Women's U-17 Championship; CONCACAF Women's U-15 Championship	CONCACAF W Champions Cup; Summer Cup; UNCAF Women's Interclub Championship
Asia (AFC)	AFC Women's Asian Cup	Asian Games Women's Football Tournament	AFC U-20 Women's Asian Cup; AFC U-17 Women's Asian Cup	AFC Women's Champions League; AFC Women's Club Championship; SAFF Club Women's Championship; WAFF Women's Clubs Championship
Africa (CAF)	Africa Women Cup of Nations	African Games Women's Football Tournament	African U-20 Women's World Cup qualification African U-17 Cup of Nations for Women	CAF Women's Champions League; UNAF Women's Club Tournament
Oceania (OFC)	OFC Women's Nations Cup	Pacific Games Women's Football Tournament; Pacific Mini Games Women's Football Tournament	OFC U-20 Women's Championship; OFC U-17 Women's Championship	OFC Women's Champions League
Arab League (UAFA)	Arab Women's Cup		Arab U-17 Women's Cup	Arab Ladies Football Championship; Arab Women's Super Cup
Other invitational tournaments	Algarve Cup - Arnold Clark Cup - Cup of Nations - Cyprus Women's Cup - Four Nations Tournament - Istria Cup - Pinatar Cup - SheBelieves Cup - Tournament of Nations - Tournoi de France - Turkish Women's Cup - Women's Revelations Cup - Women's Amputee World Cup			The Women's Cup

== See also ==
- List of women's association football clubs
- List of association football competitions
