= 2022 Women's Revelations Cup =

Tournament details
- Host country: Mexico
- City: León
- Dates: 31 August – 6 September
- Teams: 4 (from 2 associations)
- Venue: 1 (in 1 host city)

Final positions
- Champions: Colombia
- Runners-up: Mexico
- Third place: Chile
- Fourth place: Canada

Tournament statistics
- Matches played: 6
- Goals scored: 19 (3.17 per match)
- Top scorer: 5 players (2 goals each)
- Best player: (Mexico) Alice Soto
- Best goalkeeper: (Colombia) Luisa Agudelo
- Fair play award: Chile

The 2022 Women's Revelations Cup (31 August – 6 September 2022) was an international association football tournament organized by Mexican Football Federation (FMF) for women's under-17 national teams. This was the inaugural edition of the tournament and took place in León, Guanajuato, Mexico. The 2022 tournament featured four nations preparing for the FIFA U-17 Women's World Cup taking place in India in October, including Canada, Chile, Colombia, and host Mexico. Two matches were played per day in a round robin system, with the team accumulating the most points winning the title. On 6 September 2022, Colombia and Mexico tied in the final match, resulting in the Colombia women's U-17 team finishing as champions.

== Venue ==
The host city was announced on 20 July 2022.

León
Unidad Deportiva Enrique Fernández Martínez

== Format ==
Four U-17 teams were announced as participants for the inaugural edition of the tournament. They played against each other in a round-robin format for a total of 3 matches per team. The team with the most points were declared winners.

Tiebreakers:

- Greater goal difference
- Highest number of goals scored
- Highest number of points between tied teams

== Results ==
All times are local, CDT (UTC−5).

| Pos | Team | Pld | W | D | L | GF | GA | GD | Pts |
|---|---|---|---|---|---|---|---|---|---|
| 1 | Colombia (C) | 3 | 2 | 1 | 0 | 4 | 2 | +2 | 7 |
| 2 | Mexico (H) | 3 | 1 | 1 | 1 | 6 | 4 | +2 | 4 |
| 3 | Chile | 3 | 1 | 0 | 2 | 5 | 6 | −1 | 3 |
| 4 | Canada | 3 | 1 | 0 | 2 | 4 | 7 | −3 | 3 |

Source: Women's Revelations Cup
(C) Champions; (H) Hosts
31 August 2022
13:00 UTC−5

| Colombia | 1–0 | Canada |
|---|---|---|
| Perlaza 90+3' | Report |

Unidad Deportiva Enrique Fernández, León
31 August 2022
16:00 UTC−5

| Mexico | 1–2 | Chile |
|---|---|---|
| Vargas 19' | Report | Millones 38'; Bustamante 41' |

Unidad Deportiva Enrique Fernández, León

3 September 2022
13:00 UTC−5

| Colombia | 2–1 | Chile |
|---|---|---|
| Rodríguez 56'; Torres 59' | Report | Tapia 18' |

Unidad Deportiva Enrique Fernández, León
3 September 2022
16:00 UTC−5

| Mexico | 4–1 | Canada |
|---|---|---|
| Soto 32', 57'; Espinoza 84'; Sirdah 88' | Report | Watson 5' |

Unidad Deportiva Enrique Fernández, León

6 September 2022
13:00 UTC−5

| Canada | 3–2 | Chile |
|---|---|---|
| Allen 5', 62'; Wong 68' | Report | Rovner 23' (pen.); Millones 59' |

Unidad Deportiva Enrique Fernández, León
6 September 2022
16:00 UTC−5

| Mexico | 1–1 | Colombia |
|---|---|---|
| Vargas 20' | Report | Rodríguez 48' (pen.) |

Unidad Deportiva Enrique Fernández, León

== Goalscorers ==
There were 19 goals scored in 6 matches, for an average of 3.17 goals per match.

2 goals

- (Canada) Amanda Allen
- (Chile) Natsumy Millones
- (Colombia) Gabriela Rodríguez
- (Mexico) Alice Soto
- (Mexico) Valerie Vargas

1 goal

- (Canada) Renee Watson
- (Canada) Emily Wong
- (Chile) Paloma Bustamante
- (Chile) Tali Rovner
- (Chile) Maitte Tapia
- (Colombia) Stefanía Perlaza
- (Colombia) Karla Torres
- (Mexico) Giselle Espinoza
- (Mexico) Layla Sirdah

== Awards ==
The following awards were given at the conclusion of the tournament:

| Award | Winner |
|---|---|
| Best player | (Mexico) Alice Soto |
| Top scorer | (Canada) Amanda Allen (Chile) Natsumy Millones (Colombia) Gabriela Rodríguez (Mexico) Alice Soto (Mexico) Valerie Vargas |
| Best goalkeeper | (Colombia) Luisa Agudelo |
| Fair Play | Chile |
