= Lieke Martens =

Dutch footballer (born 1992)

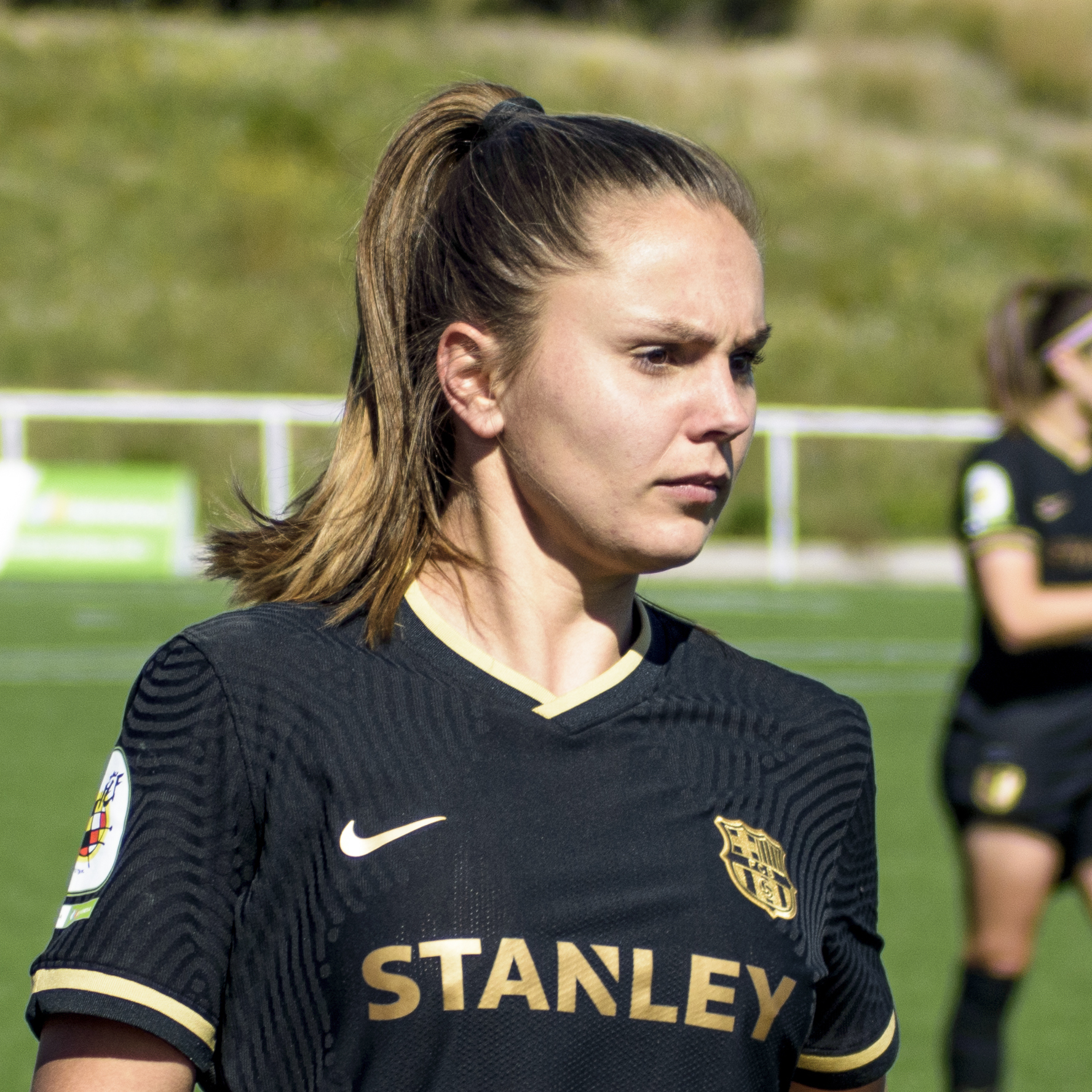
- Martens with Barcelona in 2021

Personal information
- Full name: Lieke Elisabeth Petronella Martens-van Leer
- Birth name: Lieke Elisabeth Petronella Martens
- Date of birth: 16 December 1992 (age 33)
- Place of birth: Bergen, Netherlands
- Height: 1.70 m (5 ft 7 in)
- Positions: Winger; midfielder

Youth career
- 1997–2005: RKVV Montagnards
- 2005–2008: Olympia '18
- 2008–2009: Hogeschool van Amsterdam

Senior career*
Years	Team	Apps	(Gls)
2009–2010	Heerenveen	18	(2)
2010–2011	VVV-Venlo	20	(9)
2011–2012	Standard Liège	25	(17)
2012–2014	FCR 2001 Duisburg	30	(7)
2014–2015	Kopparbergs/Göteborg	37	(12)
2015–2017	Rosengård	29	(20)
2017–2022	Barcelona	110	(54)
2022–2025	Paris Saint-Germain	32	(6)
Total		301	(128)

International career
2006–2007	Netherlands U15	2	(0)
2008	Netherlands U16	4	(1)
2007–2009	Netherlands U17	17	(7)
2009–2011	Netherlands U19	28	(18)
2011–2024	Netherlands	160	(62)
Medal record
Women's football
Representing the Netherlands
FIFA Women's World Cup
Runner-up	2019 France
UEFA Women's Championship
Winner	2017 Netherlands
- * Club domestic league appearances and goals as of 1 July 2025

Lieke Elisabeth Petronella Martens-van Leer (Dutch pronunciation: [ˈlikə ʔeːˈlisaːbɛt peːtroːˈnɛlaː ˈmɑrtəns]; née Martens; born 16 December 1992) is a Dutch former professional footballer who played as a winger or midfielder.

Martens began her professional career playing for Dutch, German and Belgian clubs relatively close to her hometown of Bergen, Limburg. In 2015, Martens broke out on the international stage when she scored the Netherlands’ first ever goal in a Women's World Cup against New Zealand. In 2016, Martens’ performances at Swedish club FC Rosengård attracted the attention of FC Barcelona, who signed her the following year. Weeks after her signing at FC Barcelona was made official, Martens participated in the Netherlands' 2017 UEFA Women's Euro campaign. She was the Netherlands' standout player at that year's Euro, where the Dutch won their first ever major international title with the women's national team. She was chosen as Player of the Tournament, and later in 2017, she was voted as The Best FIFA Women's Player as well as the UEFA Women's Player of the Year.

In 2018, Forbes ranked Martens Number 22 in their "Most Powerful Women in International Sports" list. In the 2018–19 season, Martens helped FC Barcelona to their first ever UEFA Women's Champions League final, where she assisted their only goal in a 4–1 defeat to Olympique Lyonnais. Months later, she played in the 2019 FIFA Women's World Cup, where she fought through a toe injury for most of the tournament. The Dutch reached the final and were defeated by the United States.

In 2021, Martens was an essential part of FC Barcelona Femení completing their first continental treble, winning the UEFA Women's Champions League, the Primera Division, and the Copa de la Reina all in the same season.

After leaving PSG Martens retired aged 32.

== Early life ==
Lieke Elisabeth Petronella Martens was born on 16 December 1992, in Bergen in the north of the Dutch province of Limburg. She recalls playing football in her garden as a child.

Martens began playing football at five years old at local club RKVV Montagnards. At thirteen, she went to Boxmeer club Olympia '18 at the insistence of then national-team coach Vera Pauw, where she played with teams of boys. She then went to the Hogeschool van Amsterdam between the years of 2008–2009 before leaving to SC Heerenveen.

== Club career ==
=== SC Heerenveen ===
Martens made the step to the Vrouwen Eredivisie at sixteen, first representing SC Heerenveen. She scored twice in eighteen appearances for the club.

=== VVV-Venlo ===
Martens continued playing football in the Netherlands when she joined the newly-formed VVV-Venlo women's team, based in her hometown province of Limburg. Martens scored the club's first ever goal in the Vrouwen Eredivisie, a penalty against her former club SC Heerenveen. She played 20 matches for the club and scored nine times.

=== Standard Liège ===
In 2011, Martens made the move from the Vrouwen Eredivisie to the Belgian First Division, where she played for Standard Liège. In her first official match with Standard she scored two goals to help win her first major title, the newly founded BeNe Super Cup. She also won the 2011–12 league title with the club in the Belgian Women's First Division, now known as the Belgian Women's Super League.

She made her UEFA Women's Champions League debut with Standard, scoring once in their Round of 32 tie against Brøndby IF. Her first Champions League goal came in the second leg, where she converted a penalty to bring Standard 4–3 up, but they lost the tie on a 5–4 aggregate score.

Martens scored 17 goals in the six months she was at the club.

=== Duisburg ===
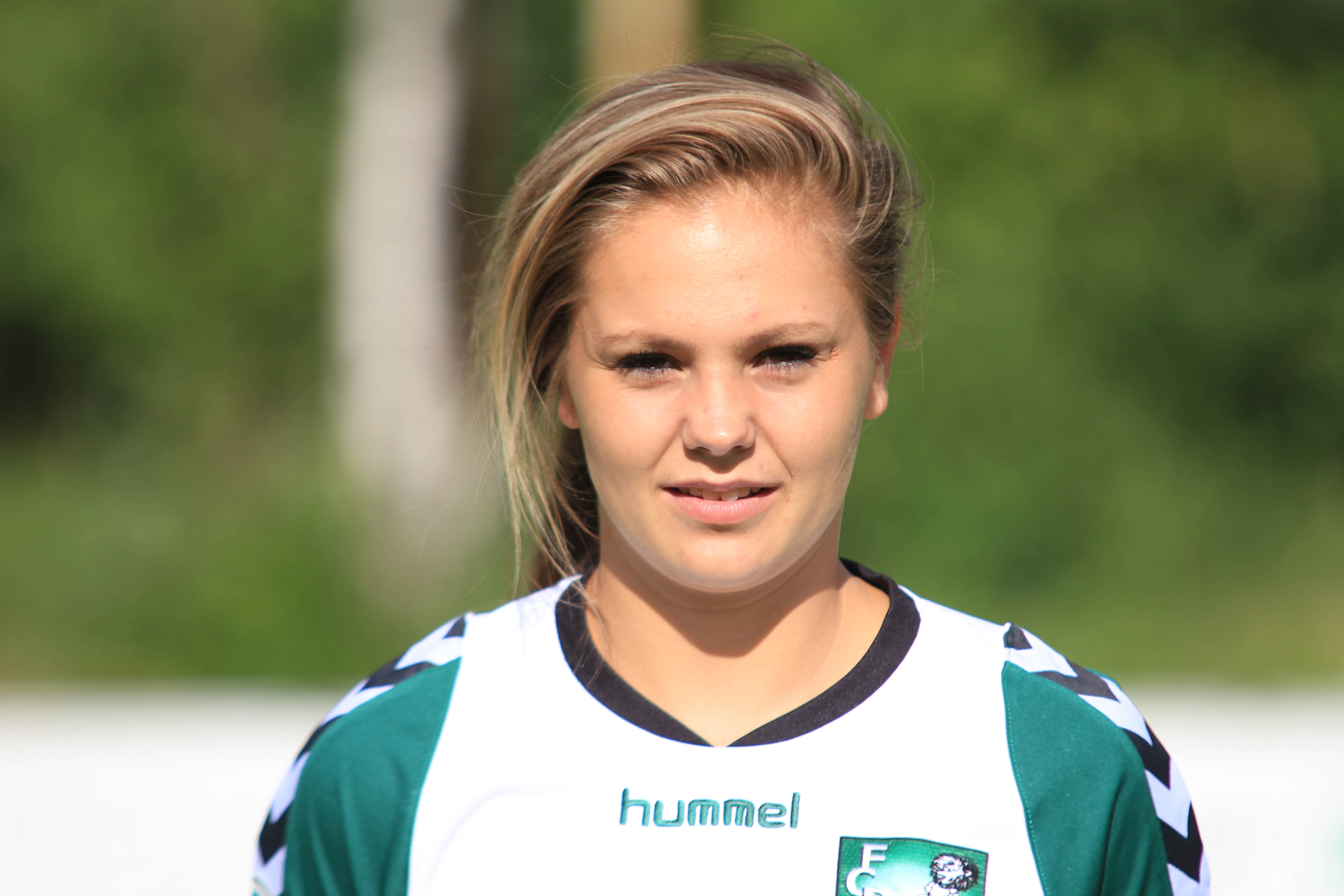
Martens with Duisburg in 2012

After spending a year playing for Standard Liège, she made the move to German Bundesliga club FCR 2001 Duisburg. Duisburg sporting director Claudio Marcone said her decision was influenced by Duisburg's close proximity to Limburg. Martens’ transfer was delayed due to a paperwork mixup within the German Football Association, so she was not allowed to play for Duisburg until July 2012, despite the transfer being made official in March 2012.

=== Kopparbergs/Göteborg ===
Martens made the move to the Swedish Damallsvenskan when she signed for Kopparbergs/Göteborg FC ahead of the 2014 Damallsvenskan season. Martens made her debut against Vittsjö GIK. Coach Stefan Rehn praised Martens' technique and her understanding with compatriot centre forward Manon Melis.

=== Rosengård ===
In November 2015, it was announced that Martens had left Göteborg, transferring to Damallsvenskan champions FC Rosengård on a one-year contract.

In the 2016–17 UEFA Women's Champions League, she was knocked out of the competition by her future club FC Barcelona in the quarterfinals on a 3–0 aggregate score. In the semifinal of the 2016 Svenska Cupen, she scored the game-winning goal against Piteå IF to make it to the cup final. Martens scored in the final, where Rosengård won the match 3–1. Martens also won the 2016 Svenska Supercupen with the club, as well as finishing the 2016 Damallsvenskan in second place.

Martens departed Rosengård in July 2017. Upon her departure from the club, she was tied as the league's third-highest scorer in that season's competition with eight goals in 11 appearances.

=== FC Barcelona ===
==== 2017–18 season ====
In July 2017, Martens signed for FC Barcelona for an undisclosed fee on a three-year-long contract. She made her debut for the club as a substitute in a 9–0 win against Zaragoza CCF. She scored her first goal in a 10–0 win over Santa Teresa. Barcelona finished the league that season in second place, one point behind rivals Atlético Madrid. Martens had eight assists and 11 goals in the league that year, and was Barcelona's second-highest goalscorer behind Andressa Alves.

In the semifinals of the 2018 Copa de la Reina, Martens scored what was nearly Barcelona's game-winning goal against Athletic Bilbao until Lucía García scored the equalizer less than a minute later. The match went to penalties where Barcelona went through to the final against Atlético Madrid. Martens played all 120 minutes of the final that went to extra time, which Barcelona won through a Mariona Caldentey goal in the 122nd minute. The 2018 Copa de la Reina was her first major title with the club.

In the 2017–18 UEFA Women's Champions League campaign, Martens recorded three assists in a win against Round of 16 opponent FC Gintra. In the quarterfinals of that year's competition, Barcelona faced Lyon, where they lost 3–1 on aggregate. Martens made it to that year's UWCL Team of the Season.

==== 2018–19 season ====
For much of the beginning of the 2018–19 season, Martens dealt with multiple injuries. In 2019, Martens started against Atlético Madrid in the Wanda Metropolitano, in a match that broke the attendance record for a women's club football match with 60,739 attendees. Barcelona won 2–0, but the win wasn't enough to secure a league title, and they finished second place for the fourth season in a row.

Barcelona had a relatively unsuccessful Copa de la Reina campaign that year. They defeated Madrid CFF 3–0 in the quarterfinal, with Martens scoring the first goal of the match. They reached the semifinal where they played Atlético Madrid, but fell 2–0 to their rivals after a brace from Ludmila.

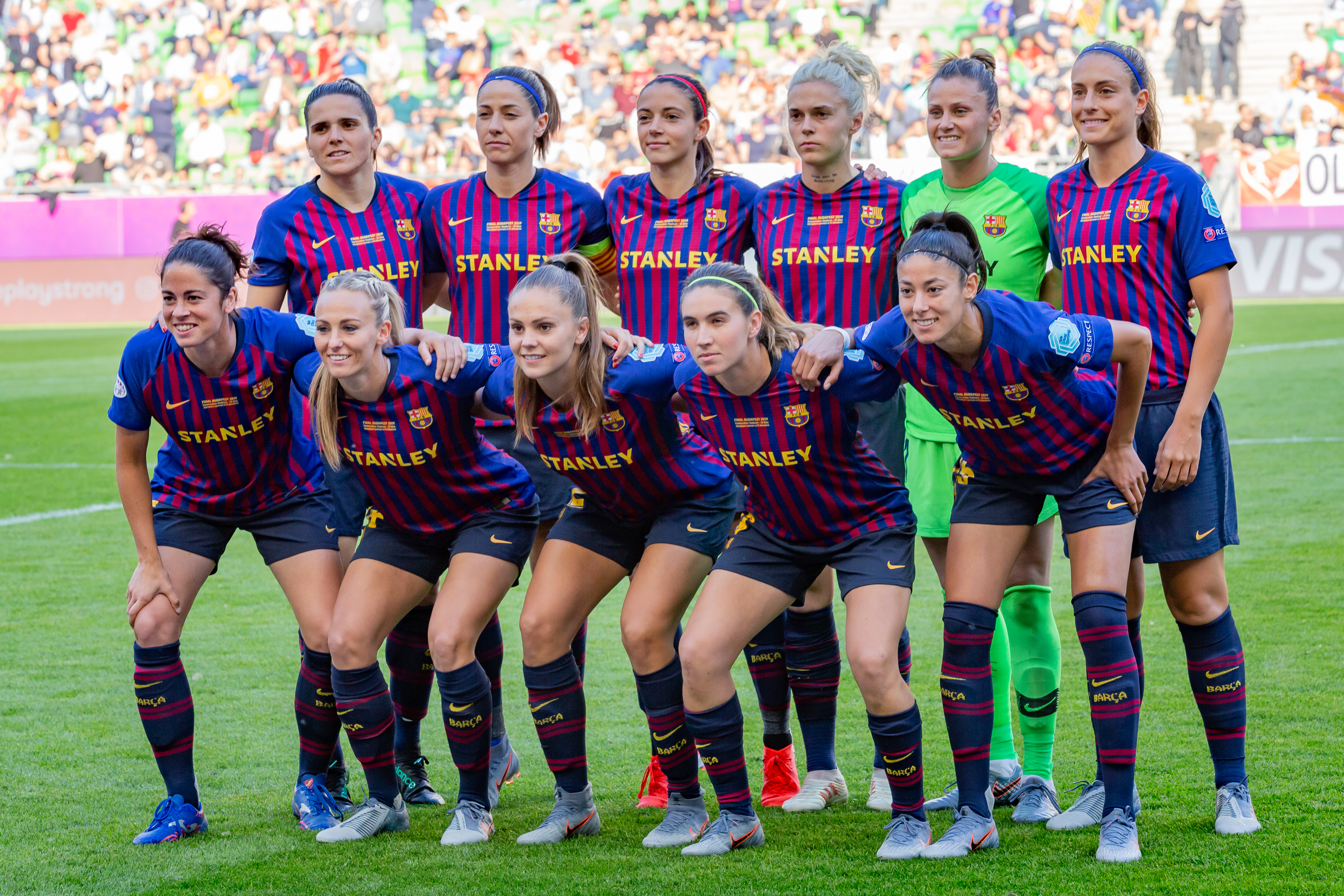
Martens (bottom, center) lining up for the 2019 UEFA Women's Champions League Final with Barcelona.

Martens helped FC Barcelona reach the final of the UEFA Women's Champions League in her second season at the club. They lost the final 4–1 against Lyon on 18 May in Budapest. Barcelona's one goal was scored by Asisat Oshoala and assisted by Martens. Despite reports that Lyon were interested in signing Martens, she extended her Barcelona contract in July 2019 for three more years until 2022.

==== 2019–20 season ====
Martens missed the first half of Barcelona's 2019–20 season due to the severity of her toe injury from the 2019 Women's World Cup. She returned to training in November 2019 and was medically cleared later in the month.

Martens featured in the first ever edition of the Supercopa Femenina in 2020, where Barcelona played Atlético Madrid in the semifinal of the competition. Martens scored one goal and gave an assist to Asisat Oshoala in a 3–2 win in Barcelona's favor. They made it to the final, where Martens gave two assists and played all 90 minutes in a 10–1 blowout of Real Sociedad.

In May 2020, the COVID-19 pandemic brought on the premature cancellation of the 2019–20 Primera Iberdrola, which was awarded to Barcelona after 21 matchdays. With this cancellation, Martens won her first league title with Barcelona and also the second league title of her senior career. Alongside the cancellation of the Spanish league, the COVID-19 pandemic also brought about the indefinite suspension of the 2019–20 UEFA Women's Champions League. In August 2020, the competition resumed, with modified single-legged ties. Martens started the quarterfinal match against Atlético Madrid, but was subbed off for Mariona Caldentey. Barcelona were saved by a late winner from Kheira Hamraoui and made it to the semifinal against VfL Wolfsburg. Martens did not start and entered late in the match, as Barcelona's campaign ended with a 1–0 loss to the Germans.

Similarly to the 2019–20 UEFA Women's Champions League, the 2019–20 Copa de la Reina was pushed back a year, and was completed in the middle of the 2020–21 season. Martens started all matches of that campaign except for the Round of 16, and Barcelona won the trophy by winning the final 3–0 against EdF Logroño.

==== 2020–21 season ====
In the first match of the 2020–21 league season, Barcelona played in the first version of the Women's Clásico, where Martens subbed on and scored Barcelona's third of four goals against Las Blancas. Later that season, she participated in another historic league match when Barcelona played against rivals Espanyol at the Camp Nou, the first women's football team to play a competitive match at the stadium. She was substituted on in the 65th minute, and scored Barcelona's fourth goal of the match. Barcelona finished as league winners in May 2021 after winning 26 straight matches.

Martens began her 2020–21 Champions League season by scoring 3 goals in 2 matches against Dutch side PSV in the Round of 32. In the Round of 16, Barcelona faced Fortuna Hjørring. Martens was injured for the first match of the tie, and for the second match of the tie, she came into the match as a substitute where she recorded an assist. Martens was used as a substitute in both matches of the quarterfinals against Manchester City, where Barcelona won 4–2 on aggregate. In the second leg of the semifinals of the 2020–21 UEFA Women's Champions League, Martens scored a brace against PSG. Her two goals brought the aggregate score to 3–2 in Barcelona's favor and sent them to their second ever UWCL Final. Martens started the final on 16 May 2021, and was one of Barcelona's most involved forwards. She assisted Barcelona's fourth and final goal, a dribble down the wing and a cross into the box that was finished by Caroline Graham Hansen. Martens ended the competition having scored five goals and giving one assist in seven games, and was included in the UWCL Squad of the Season.

In the 2021 Copa de la Reina, Martens played in the quarterfinals of the competition against Sevilla, where she was subbed on in the 60th minute and assisted Caroline Graham Hansen's goal that put Barcelona 4–1 up. In the semifinals, Martens gave another assist, this time to Alexia Putellas who scored Barcelona's fourth goal against Madrid CFF. In that season's Copa de la Reina final, Martens registered three assists in a 4–2 win over Levante, including the assist to Marta Torrejón's game-winning goal. With this title win came the completion of Barcelona's continental treble, the first Spanish women's football team to do so. Following the completion of the treble, Martens ended her season and took an early leave from the club to join her national team in preparation for the 2021 Olympics.

Martens ended her season with 20 goals and 16 assists in all competitions. In August 2021, she was listed as one of the nominees to the UEFA Women's Champions League Forward of the Season award. In the same month, she was nominated as a finalist for the UEFA Women's Player of the Year Award for the second time in her career, alongside Barcelona teammates Alexia Putellas and Jenni Hermoso.

=== Paris Saint-Germain ===
On 16 June 2022, Martens signed a three-season deal with Paris Saint-Germain.

== International career ==
=== Dutch youth teams ===
Martens represented the Netherlands at a U-15, U-16, U-17, and U-19 levels.

Martens was at the 2010 UEFA Women's Under-19 Championship with the Netherlands, her first of two U-19 Euro tournaments with the Netherlands. Martens played the first game of the group stages against France, substituting on for Vanity Lewerissa in the 30th minute. She scored within 15 seconds with a header off a corner to put the Dutch 2–0 up, and also conceded a foul that gave a French player a red card. The following match against Macedonia, she earned a start and scored two goals- the first within 45 seconds, and the second in the 66th minute to put the Dutch 6–0 up. Martens started again in her last match of the group against Spain, where she scored once more with a header in the 39th minute.

The Dutch met England in the semifinals where it went to penalties, and despite Martens converting her penalty, England won and went on to the final. Martens ended her tournament as top scorer, tied at four goals with German player Turid Knaak. UEFA named her as one of the top 10 emerging talents from the tournament.

=== Senior team ===
==== 2011–2013: Debut and first Euro tournament ====
In August 2011 she played her first game for the senior national team, in a friendly match against China. Martens became a regular starter for the national team around 2012.

In June 2013, national team coach Roger Reijners selected Martens in the Netherlands squad for UEFA Women's Euro 2013 in Sweden. The Dutch were drawn into Group B with eventual tournament-winners Germany, eventual tournament runners-up Norway, and Iceland. Martens played all 90 minutes of each of the Netherlands' Group B matches. The Dutch had a poor tournament, and exited the group stage with just one point from a draw against Germany and zero goals scored.

==== 2014–2016: Netherlands' Women's World Cup debut ====
In 2014, the Dutch finished second in their 2015 Women's World Cup qualification group, so they were set to qualification play-offs against Scotland. In the first leg of the playoff semifinal against Scotland, Martens scored in the tenth minute off a rebound from Vivianne Miedema. Martens scored again in the second leg of the playoff semifinal off an assist from Daniëlle van de Donk. The tie ended 4–1 on aggregate, sending the Dutch to the qualification play-off final against Italy. The Dutch beat the Italians on an aggregate score of 3–2, with Martens assisting Vivianne Miedema's tie-winning goal in the second leg, sending them to compete in their first ever Women's World Cup tournament.

In the Netherlands' first ever Women's World Cup match, Martens scored the Netherlands' first ever Women's World Cup goal against New Zealand, which was also the match-winner. The goal, a long-range shot from 30 meters out, was later voted the fifth-best goal of the competition. Later in the group stage, the Dutch lost to China and drew 1–1 to Canada, but still made it to the Round of 16. The Dutch were defeated by Japan in the Round of 16.

In February 2016, Martens was announced as part of the Netherlands' squad for qualification at the 2016 Olympics. She could not compete in the tournament, however, as she was ruled out with a concussion and had to exit camp. The Netherlands did not end up qualifying for the tournament, as they finished second in the qualification table behind Sweden.

==== 2017: Player of the Tournament at the 2017 UEFA Women's Euro ====
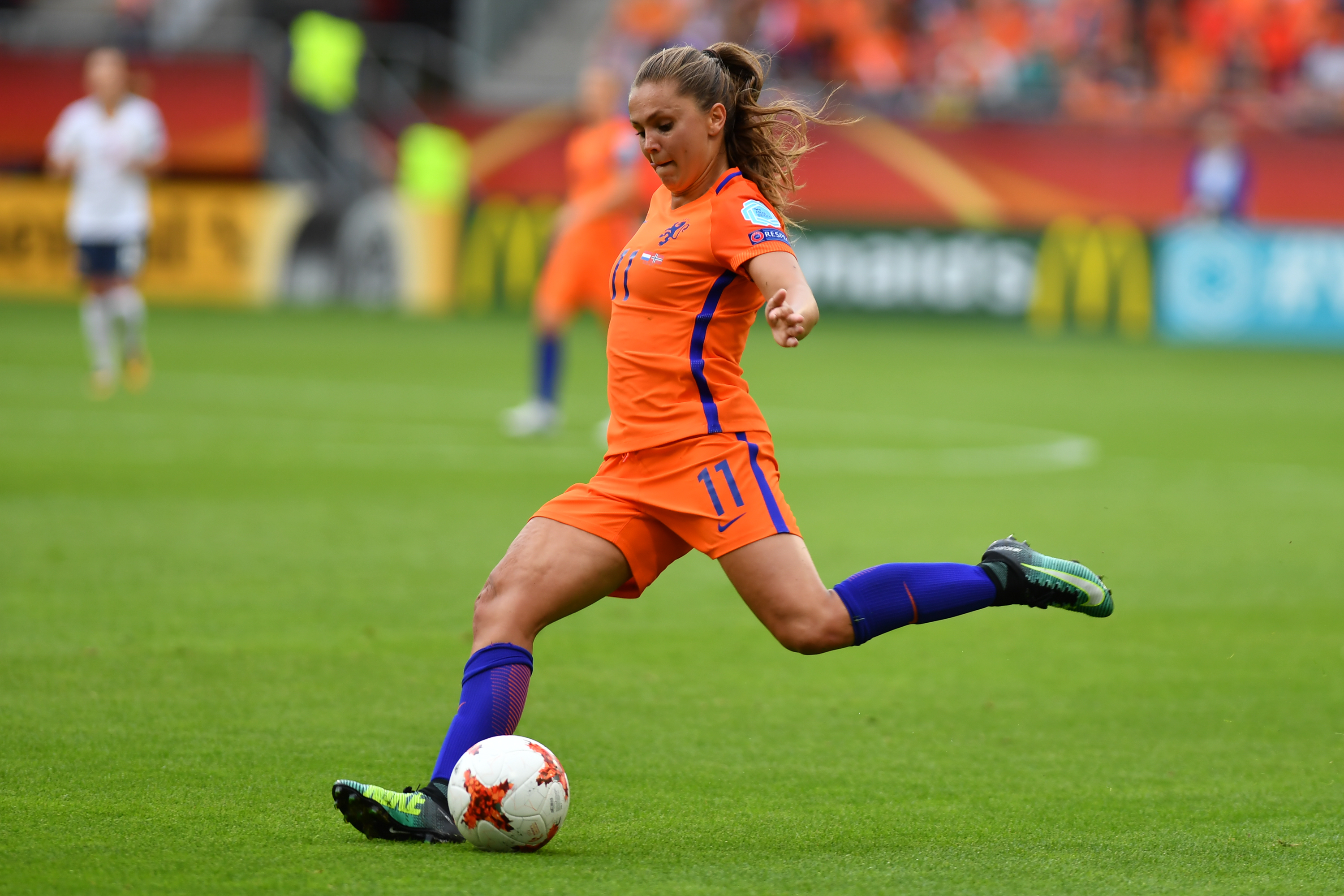
Martens playing in the UEFA Women's Euro 2017

A week after Martens' signing for FC Barcelona, she competed with the Netherlands in the 2017 UEFA Women's Euro, which was also being hosted in the Netherlands. In their first match of the tournament against Norway, Martens sent in a cross to assist Shanice van de Sanden's game-winning header. Martens' performance would be her first Player of the Match award in that year's competition. In the final match of the group stage, the Netherlands played Belgium, where Martens scored the game-winning goal in the 74th minute from a through ball courtesy of Jill Roord, another performance that she won Player of the Match for. The hosts finished atop of Group A with 9 points from 3 straight wins.

They faced Group B runners-up Sweden in the quarterfinals, and Martens drew first blood for the Dutch from a low free-kick. In addition, she was instrumental in the creation of Vivianne Miedema's header goal in the 64th minute that brought the Dutch 2–0 up and into the semifinals. In the semifinals against England, Martens played all 90 minutes and was instrumental in the buildup of Vivianne Miedema's game-winning goal. She was also responsible for the shot that deflected off Millie Bright's leg and lead to an own goal in the 93rd minute. The Netherlands' 3–0 victory sent them to their first ever UEFA Women's Euro final, where they were set to compete against group-stage opponents Denmark. Martens started the final and scored the third goal of the match, a shot from the outside of the box into the lower-right corner, to bring the Netherlands 2–1 up in the 30th minute. The match would end up finishing 4–2, and Martens would end as Player of the Tournament, having scored 3 goals and giving 2 assists in six matches. Martens was included in the 2017 UEFA Women's Euro Team of the Tournament and won the Bronze Boot (third top scorer).

After the tournament, the whole team was honoured by the Prime Minister Mark Rutte and Minister of Sport Edith Schippers and made Knights of the Order of Orange-Nassau.

==== 2018–2019: Reaching the Women's World Cup final ====
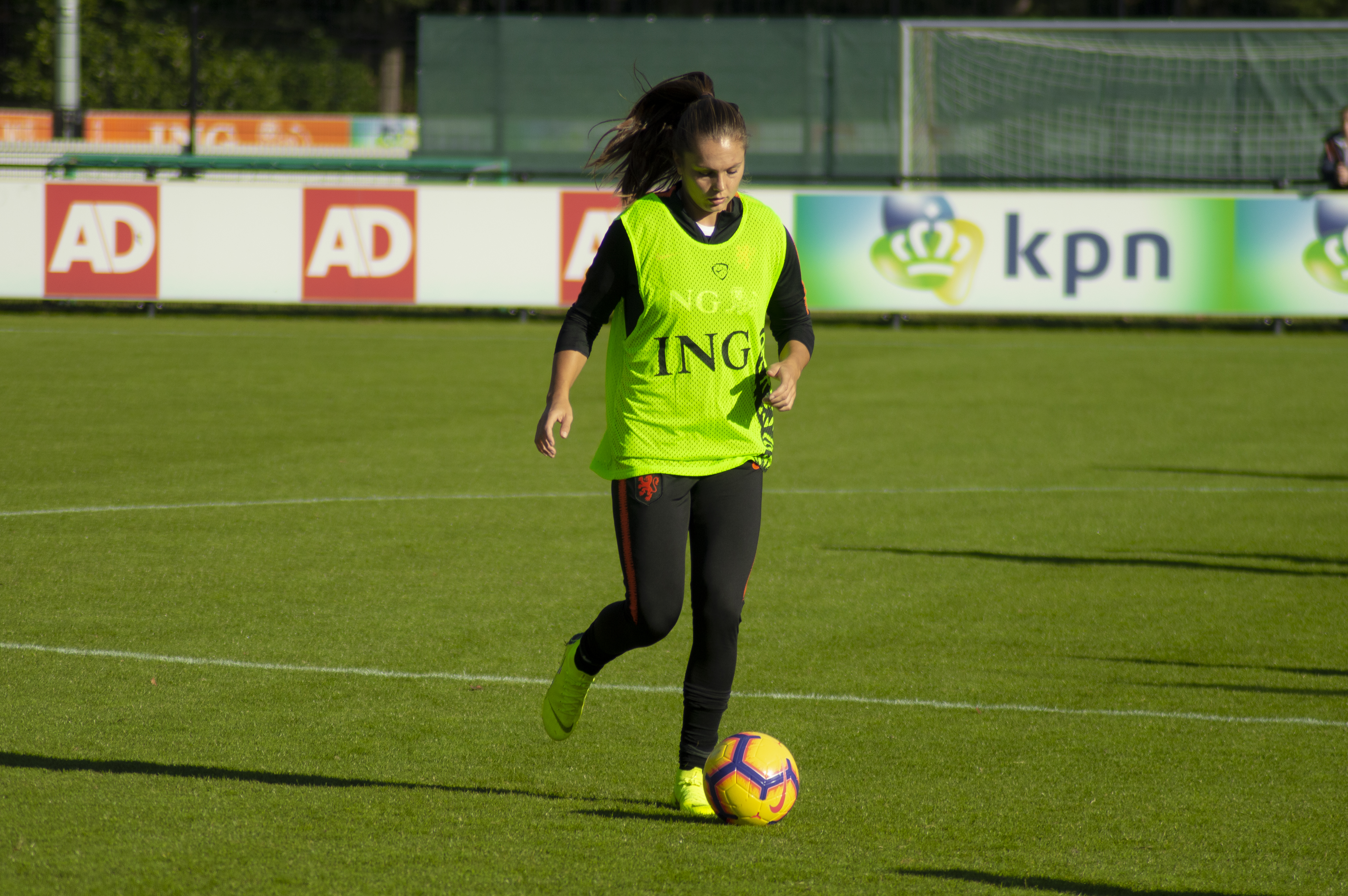
Lieke Martens training with the Netherlands on 6 November 2018.

The Dutch struggled to qualify for the 2019 Women's World Cup, when a draw against Ireland and a loss against Norway placed them second in their qualification group and forced them to enter qualification playoffs. Martens did not feature in the semi-final tie of the playoffs due to a foot injury, and the Dutch won 4–1 on aggregate against Denmark. A month later, Martens returned to the squad and scored in a 3–0 win over Switzerland in the first leg of the playoff final. The Dutch successfully qualified for the World Cup after defeating Switzerland 4–1 on aggregate over the 2 legs of the playoff final.

Martens was selected in the final squad for the 2019 FIFA Women's World Cup in France, despite the fact that her large toe was injured. She scored both Dutch goals in a 2–1 victory over Japan in the round of 16, the second from a controversial VAR-awarded penalty. When celebrating her last-minute winner against Japan, teammate Jill Roord stepped on her foot and aggrivated her toe injury. Martens didn't train before the Netherlands' upcoming quarter-final match against Italy. Despite her worsening injury, she started against Italy and played all 90 minutes in the match, which ended in a 2–0 win. In the Netherlands' following semi-final match against Sweden, she started but was substituted out because of the pain she felt in her toe from the beginning of the match. Thanks to a goal in extra time from Jackie Groenen, the Dutch made it to their first ever Women's World Cup final against the United States. Martens trained separately from the rest of the Netherlands squad ahead of the final, and starting the final was going to be a "gameday decision" as manager Sarina Wiegman was not particularly confident about the evolution of Marten's injury. Martens started the final regardless, but had a hard head-to-head collision with United States defender Kelley O'Hara that caused them to both be down on the pitch for a few minutes. Martens continued to play to the second half, but after the Netherlands conceded two goals within ten minutes, she was subbed off for Jill Roord in the 70th minute. The score kept to full time, and the Dutch lost the final 0–2.

==== 2020: First Olympics tournament ====
On 16 June 2021, Martens was named as one of the Netherlands' 18 first-team players at the 2020 Olympics, the Netherlands women's first ever Olympics tournament. In the first match of the group stages, Martens scored her 50th national team goal against Zambia. Martens scored another in that match with the final result being Zambia 3–10 Netherlands, the highest scoring women's football match in Olympics history. In the Netherlands' third and final group stage match, Martens scored another two goals against China as the Dutch advanced to the quarterfinals of the tournament. They faced their 2019 Women's World Cup Final rivals the United States, where Martens missed a penalty in the 81st minute and the Dutch were defeated after a penalty shootout following a period of extra time.

==== 2023: Women's World Cup ====
On 31 May 2023, she was named as part of the Netherlands provisional squad for the 2023 FIFA Women's World Cup.

== Retirement ==
Martens played her last international match on 4 June 2024, which ended in a 1–1 draw against Finland. and after an atypical season in which she became a mother, in a statement on her Facebook and Instagram accounts, she announced her final retirement from football on September 1, 2025, following a 16-year career filled with both team and individual success.

== Style of play ==
Martens primarily plays as a winger that is capable of playing either flank, but prefers the left wing, despite being right-footed. Martens solely plays as a left wing for her national team and for Barcelona, but switched between the right and left wings for the beginning of her Barcelona career. Because she is right-footed, she scores goals primarily with her right foot. She also has a tendency to cut inside during dribbles.

Martens was identified as a top attacking talent as a young child by former Netherlands national team coach Vera Pauw, who has praised her attacking ability, saying Martens has “done things she's never seen any other player do." When she was a teenager, former Netherlands women's nation team coach Roger Reijners described her as a constant threat at goal with quality ball skills and ball retention.

Martens has many times been compared to Dutch footballing legend Johan Cruyff, in terms of their playing positions, playing styles, skills, and leadership, as well as the teams they both played for. In the 2019 FIFA Women's World Cup, she performed a Cruyff Turn against a New Zealand defender.

== Personal life ==
Martens grew up supporting AFC Ajax.

Martens earned a Masters in football business from the Johan Cruyff Institute.

Since 2018, she has been in a relationship with professional goalkeeper Benjamin van Leer, then player for Jong Ajax. They adopted a dog together in 2020 and got engaged in November 2021. On 13 June 2023, they married in Málaga, Spain.

On 19 August 2024, Martens publicly announced that the couple was expecting their first child., a boy called Lowen, born in February 2025.

On 3 February 2026 Martens announced via Instagram that her and her partner were expecting their 2nd baby boy. Sadly on 29 March 2026 Martens announced that she had suffered a miscarriage

== Outside football ==
=== Sponsorships ===
Martens is considered one of the most marketable athletes in the world by SportsPro.

Martens is sponsored by Nike. In 2017, after Martens’ successes at the 2017 UEFA Women's Euro, Nike released a pair of Oranje Leeuwinnen-inspired Mercurial boots, the “'Lieke' Mercurial Superfly V." In 2019, she featured in Nike's “Dream Further” commercial as promotion for the 2019 Women's World Cup.

Martens is a PepsiCo ambassador, and has featured in commercials for their brand, Lay's, alongside Lionel Messi and Paul Pogba. She is also the face of Dutch jewelry brand Zinzi as well as a member of football media studio OTRO.,

== Career statistics ==
=== Club ===
As of 15 March 2026

Appearances and goals by club, season and competition
Club	Season	League			Cup		Other		UWCL		Total	
Club	Season	Division	Apps	Goals	Apps	Goals	Apps	Goals	Apps	Goals	Apps	Goals
Heerenveen	2009–10	Eredivisie	18	2	–		–		–		18	2
VVV-Venlo	2010–11	Eredivisie	20	9	–		–		–		20	9
Standard Liège	2011–12	First Division	25	17	–		1 (Note: Appearances in BeNe Super Cup)	2	2	1	28	20
FCR 2001 Duisburg	2011-12	Frauen-Bundesliga	0	0	1	0	–		–		1	0
FCR 2001 Duisburg	2012–13	Frauen-Bundesliga	20	5	2 (Note: Appearances in DFB-Pokal)	1	–		–		22	6
FCR 2001 Duisburg	2013–14	Frauen-Bundesliga	10	2	2	3	–		–		12	5
FCR 2001 Duisburg	Total		30	7	5	4	–		–		35	11
Kopparbergs/Göteborg	2014	Damallsvenskan	19	7	1 (Note: Appearances in Svenska Cupen)	0	–		–		20	7
Kopparbergs/Göteborg	2015	Damallsvenskan	18	5	1	0	–		–		19	5
Kopparbergs/Göteborg	Total		37	12	2	0	–		–		39	12
Rosengård	2016	Damallsvenskan	18	12	4	2	–		2	0	21	13
Rosengård	2017	Damallsvenskan	11	8	3	2	1 (Note: Appearances in Svenska Supercupen)	1	5	0	20	11
Rosengård	Total		29	20	7	4	1	1	7	0	44	25
Barcelona	2017–18	Primera División	29	11	4 (Note: Appearances in Copa de la Reina)	1	–		5	2	38	14
Barcelona	2018–19	Primera División	23	11	2	1	–		6	2	31	14
Barcelona	2019–20	Primera División	12	1	3	0	2 (Note: Appearances in Supercopa de España)	1	2	0	19	2
Barcelona	2020–21	Primera División	25	15	3	0	0	0	8	5	36	20
Barcelona	2021–22	Primera División	21	17	3	2	2	2	6	2	32	23
Barcelona	Total		110	55	15	4	4	3	27	11	156	73
Paris Saint-Germain	2022–23	Première Ligue	16	3	4 (Note: Appearances in Coupe de France)	0	1 (Note: Appearances in the Trophée des Championnes)	0	7	2	24	5
Paris Saint-Germain	2023–24	Première Ligue	16	3	3	2	–		10	2	28	7
Paris Saint-Germain	Total		32	6	7	2	1	0	17	4	52	12
Career total			301	128	36	14	7	6	52	16	392	164

=== International goals ===
Scores and results list the Netherlands' goal tally first, score column indicates score after each Martens goal.

List of international goals scored by Lieke Martens
No.	Date	Venue	Opponent	Score	Result	Competition
1	28 February 2012	GSZ Stadium, Larnaca, Cyprus	Italy	2–1	2–1	2012 Cyprus Women's Cup
*	1 June 2012	Woezik, Wijchen, Netherlands	North Korea	1–1	4–1	Friendly
2	5 June 2012	Golden Tulip Victoria, Hoenderloo, Netherlands	North Korea	2–0	2–0	Friendly
3	20 June 2012	Stadion Srem Jakovo, Jakovo, Serbia	Serbia	3–0	4–0	UEFA Women's Euro 2013 qualifying
4	9 February 2013	Regenboogstadion, Waregem, Belgium	Belgium	2–1	3–2	Friendly
5	8 March 2013	GSP Stadium, Nicosia, Cyprus	Switzerland	1–0	1–1	2013 Cyprus Women's Cup
6	29 June 2013	Telstar Stadion, Velsen-Zuid, Netherlands	Australia	1–0	3–1	Friendly
7	29 June 2013	Telstar Stadion, Velsen-Zuid, Netherlands	Australia	2–1	3–1	Friendly
8	26 October 2013	Estádio José de Carvalho, Maia, Portugal	Portugal	4–0	7–0	2015 FIFA Women's World Cup qualification
9	23 November 2013	Stadion Woudestein, Rotterdam, Netherlands	Greece	1–0	7–0	2015 FIFA Women's World Cup qualification
10	23 November 2013	Stadion Woudestein, Rotterdam, Netherlands	Greece	5–0	7–0	2015 FIFA Women's World Cup qualification
11	7 March 2014	GSP Stadium, Nicosia, Cyprus	Scotland	2–3	3–4	2014 Cyprus Women's Cup
12	12 March 2014	GSZ Stadium, Larnaca, Cyprus	Switzerland	2–1	4–1	2014 Cyprus Women's Cup
13	12 March 2014	GSZ Stadium, Larnaca, Cyprus	Switzerland	3–1	4–1	2014 Cyprus Women's Cup
14	10 April 2014	Stadion De Braak, Helmond, Netherlands	Albania	6–1	10–1	2015 FIFA Women's World Cup qualification
15	10 April 2014	Stadion De Braak, Helmond, Netherlands	Albania	8–1	10–1	2015 FIFA Women's World Cup qualification
16	25 October 2014	Tynecastle Park, Edinburgh, Scotland	Scotland	1–0	2–1	2015 FIFA Women's World Cup qualification
17	30 October 2014	Sparta Stadion, Rotterdam, Netherlands	Scotland	1–0	2–0	2015 FIFA Women's World Cup qualification
18	7 February 2015	Polman Stadion, Almelo, Netherlands	Thailand	4–0	7–0	Friendly
19	8 April 2015	Strømmen Stadion, Strømmen, Norway	Norway	1–1	3–2	Friendly
20	8 April 2015	Strømmen Stadion, Strømmen, Norway	Norway	3–2	3–2	Friendly
21	6 June 2015	Commonwealth Stadium, Edmonton, Canada	New Zealand	1–0	1–0	2015 FIFA Women's World Cup
22	17 September 2015	De Vijverberg, Doetinchem, Netherlands	Belarus	1–0	8–0	Friendly
23	17 September 2015	De Vijverberg, Doetinchem, Netherlands	Belarus	8–0	8–0	Friendly
24	29 November 2015	Kras Stadion, Volendam, Netherlands	Japan	1–0	3–1	Friendly
25	22 January 2016	Limak Arcadia Atlantis Football Center, Belek, Turkey	Denmark	1–0	2–0	Friendly
26	8 March 2017	Estádio Algarve, Faro/Loulé, Portugal	Japan	2–0	3–2	2017 Algarve Cup
27	7 April 2017	Stadion Galgenwaard, Utrecht, Netherlands	France	1–2	1–2	Friendly
28	11 April 2017	Stadion De Vijverberg, Doetinchem, Netherlands	Iceland	3–0	4–0	Friendly
29	13 June 2017	De Adelaarshorst, Deventer, Netherlands	Austria	3–0	3–0	Friendly
30	8 July 2017	Sparta Stadion Het Kasteel, Rotterdam, Netherlands	Wales	1–0	5–0	Friendly
31	24 July 2017	Koning Willem II Stadion, Tilburg, Netherlands	Belgium	2–1	2–1	UEFA Women's Euro 2017
32	29 July 2017	De Vijverberg, Doetinchem, Netherlands	Sweden	1–0	2–0	UEFA Women's Euro 2017
33	6 August 2017	De Grolsch Veste, Enschede, Netherlands	Denmark	2–1	4–2	UEFA Women's Euro 2017
34	28 February 2018	Bela Vista Municipal Stadium, Parchal, Portugal	Japan	1–0	6–2	2018 Algarve Cup
35	28 February 2018	Bela Vista Municipal Stadium, Parchal, Portugal	Japan	6–1	6–2	2018 Algarve Cup
36	3 March 2018	VRS António Sports Complex, Vila Real de Santo António, Portugal	Denmark	2–2	3–2	2018 Algarve Cup
37	6 April 2018	Philips Stadion, Eindhoven, Netherlands	Northern Ireland	1–0	7–0	2019 FIFA Women's World Cup qualification
38	6 April 2018	Philips Stadion, Eindhoven, Netherlands	Northern Ireland	2–0	7–0	2019 FIFA Women's World Cup qualification
39	12 June 2018	Abe Lenstra Stadion, Heerenveen, Netherlands	Slovakia	1–0	1–0	2019 FIFA Women's World Cup qualification
40	9 November 2018	Stadion Galgenwaard, Utrecht, Netherlands	Switzerland	2–0	3–0	2019 FIFA Women's World Cup qualification
41	5 April 2019	GelreDome, Arnhem, Netherlands	Mexico	2–0	2–0	Friendly
42	9 April 2019	AFAS Stadion, Alkmaar, Netherlands	Chile	2–0	7–0	Friendly
43	25 June 2019	Roazhon Park, Rennes, France	Japan	1–0	2–1	2019 FIFA Women's World Cup
44	25 June 2019	Roazhon Park, Rennes, France	Japan	2–1	2–1	2019 FIFA Women's World Cup
45	10 March 2020	Stade du Hainaut, Valenciennes, France	France	3–2	3–3	2020 Tournoi de France
46	27 October 2020	Stadiumi Fadil Vokrri, Pristina, Kosovo	Kosovo	3–0	6–0	UEFA Women's Euro 2022 qualifying
47	1 December 2020	Rat Verlegh Stadion, Breda, Netherlands	Kosovo	3–0	6–0	UEFA Women's Euro 2022 qualifying
48	18 February 2021	King Baudouin Stadium, Brussels, Belgium	Belgium	4–1	6–1	Friendly
49	13 April 2021	De Goffert, Nijmegen, Netherlands	Australia	2–0	5–0	Friendly
50	21 July 2021	Q&A Stadium Miyagi, Rifu, Japan	Zambia	2–0	10–3	2020 Olympics
51	21 July 2021	Q&A Stadium Miyagi, Rifu, Japan	Zambia	5–1	10–3	2020 Olympics
52	27 July 2021	Nissan Stadium, Yokohama, Japan	China	4–1	8–2	2020 Olympics
53	27 July 2021	Nissan Stadium, Yokohama, Japan	China	6–2	8–2	2020 Olympics
54	26 October 2021	Stadyen Dynama, Minsk, Belarus	Belarus	1–0	2–0	2023 Women's World Cup Qualifying
55	25 June 2022	Elland Road, Leeds, England	England	1–0	1–5	Friendly
56	18 February 2023	Hibernians Stadium, Paola, Malta	Austria	1–0	1–2	Friendly
57	21 February 2023	National Stadium, Ta' Qali, Ta' Qali, Malta	Austria	2–0	4–0	Friendly
58	11 April 2023	Sparta Stadion Het Kasteel, Rotterdam, Netherlands	Poland	3–1	4–1	Friendly
59	1 August 2023	Forsyth Barr Stadium, Dunedin, New Zealand	Vietnam	1–0	7–0	2023 FIFA Women's World Cup
60	26 September 2023	Stadion Galgenwaard, Utrecht, Netherlands	England	1–0	2–1	2023–24 UEFA Women's Nations League

- Note: Match not considered as an official friendly.

== Honours ==
Standard Liège

- Belgian Women's Super League: 2011–12
- BeNe Super Cup: 2011

Rosengård

- Svenska Cupen: 2015–16
- Svenska Supercupen: 2016

Barcelona

- Primera División: 2019–20, 2020–21, 2021–22
- UEFA Women's Champions League: 2020–21, runner-up: 2018–19, 2021–22
- Copa de la Reina de Fútbol: 2018, 2019–20, 2020–21, 2021–22
- Supercopa de España Femenina: 2019–20, 2021–22
- Copa Catalunya: 2017, 2018, 2019

Paris Saint-Germain

- Coupe de France: 2023–24

Netherlands

- UEFA Women's Championship: 2017
- Algarve Cup: 2018
- FIFA Women's World Cup runners-up: 2019
- Tournoi de France: runner-up 2020

Individual

- UEFA Women's Under-19 Championship Top scorer: 2010
- UEFA Women's Player of the Year Award: 2017
- The Best FIFA Women's Player: 2017
- FIFPro World XI: 2017
- UEFA Women's Championship Player of the Tournament: 2017
- UEFA Women's Championship Team of the Tournament: 2017
- UEFA Women's Championship Bronze Boot: 2017
- The Offside Rule Best Female Footballer In The World: 2017
- IFFHS Award for Best Female Playmaker: 2017
- Primera División Goal of the Season: 2017–18
- IFFHS UEFA Woman Team of the Decade: 2011–2020
- UEFA Women's Champions League Squad of the Season: 2017–18, 2020–21
- Tuttosport Golden Player Woman: 2021
- IFFHS Women's World Team:2017, 2021,
- IFFHS Women's UEFA Team: 2021,

Orders

- Knight of the Order of Orange-Nassau: 2017

=== Awards and recognition ===
In 2017, Lieke Martens was nominated for and won many individual awards for the first time in her career. Most notably is her win at the 2017 The Best awards, where she was chosen from a shortlist of Carli Lloyd and Deyna Castellanos. She took the award with 21.72% of the overall vote. In addition, she won the 2017 UEFA Player of the Year award from a shortlist of Pernille Harder and Dzsenifer Marozsán. Martens also received the IFFHS award for best female playmaker of 2017 and was selected to the IFFHS Women's World Team of the Year for 2017 with 75% of the vote.

In 2017, Martens was the first ever FC Barcelona player and the first ever Dutch player to be selected to the FIFPro Women's World XI, receiving the most votes (1,251 votes) out of any other player in selection that year. Martens was nominated again in 2019 where she finished 7th amongst the forwards, and in 2020, where she finished 10th among the forwards.

In 2018, she was named 22nd Most Powerful Woman in International Sports by Forbes Magazine.

In both 2018 and 2019, Martens was a nominee for the first two editions of the Women's Ballon d'Or.

At the end of 2020, Martens was selected to the IFFHS UEFA Women's Team of the Decade for the years 2011–2020.
