= Nicola Profeta =

Venezuelan footballer (born 2006)

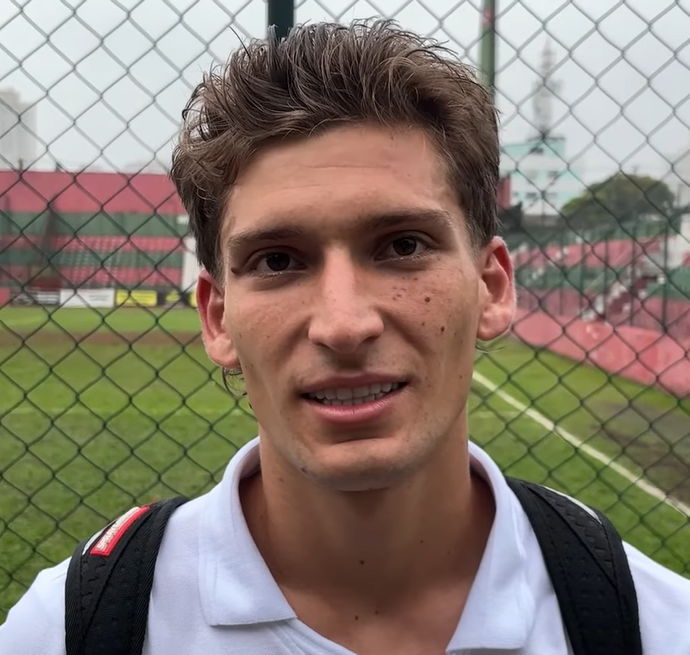
- Profeta in 2025

Personal information
- Full name: Nicola Profeta Cabrales
- Date of birth: 27 February 2006 (age 20)
- Place of birth: Puerto La Cruz, Venezuela
- Height: 1.79 m (5 ft 10 in)
- Position: Defensive midfielder

Team information
- Current team: Santos
- Number: 72

Youth career
- Centro Gallego
- Garotos de Mello
- Ciudad Vinotinto
- 2017–2023: Deportivo Cali
- 2024–: Santos

Senior career*
Years	Team	Apps	(Gls)
2023–2024	Deportivo Cali	2	(0)
2024–	Santos	0	(0)

International career^{‡}
2022	Colombia U15	3	(0)
2023	Colombia U17	4	(0)
2023	Venezuela U17	4	(1)
2024–	Venezuela U20	9	(1)
2023–	Venezuela	0	(0)
- * Club domestic league appearances and goals as of 24 December 2023 ‡ National team caps and goals as of 13:05, 18 February 2025 (UTC)

Nicola Profeta Cabrales (born 27 February 2006) is a Venezuelan footballer who plays as a defensive midfielder for Brazilian club Santos and the Venezuela national team.

== Early life ==
Profeta was born in Puerto La Cruz in the Venezuelan state of Anzoátegui to a Venezuelan mother and a father with Italian citizenship.

== Club career ==
=== Deportivo Cali ===
Having taken an interest in football from the age of three, Profeta began his career in his native Venezuela with academy sides Centro Gallego de Puerto La Cruz, Garotos de Mello PG and Ciudad Vinotinto FC. In 2017, his family travelled to neighbouring Colombia for a vacation, and while in the country they decided to stay, due to the Crisis in Venezuela. Shortly after making the stay permanent, Profeta joined the academy of professional side Deportivo Cali.

Profeta made his professional debut with Deportivo Cali on 29 November 2023, coming on as a second-half substitute for Juan Castilla in a 2–0 home loss to Deportes Tolima.

=== Santos ===
On 7 March 2024, Profeta agreed to a deal with Brazilian club Santos, but his registration was not made on time as the Profeta only had an amateur deal at Deportivo Cali, which delayed the transfer clearance. He was only officially registered in July, and also trained with the first team squad.

In February 2026, Profeta renewed his link with Peixe for a further year. In August, he further extended his link until June 2028.

== International career ==
=== Youth ===
==== Colombia ====
Profeta is eligible to represent Venezuela, Colombia and Italy at international level. Having represented Colombia at the 2022 Bolivarian Games, where Colombia finished in third place, Profeta was named in the Colombia under-17 squad for friendlies ahead of the 2023 South American U-17 Championship. He was named captain of the side for the tournament, but his performances failed to impress as Colombia were knocked out in the first round, finishing bottom of their group with only one point.

==== Venezuela ====
In July 2023, it was reported that Profeta had switched his international allegiance to Venezuela, accepting an early approach from the Venezuelan Football Federation (FVF) to represent the nation at the 2023 FIFA U-17 World Cup. This was confirmed on 31 July by the FVF, when Profeta was called up to a training camp at the National High Performance Center on Margarita Island. The following month Profeta stated in an interview with Colombian radio network RCN Radio that, despite "taking advantage of the personal opportunity that Vinotinto [had given] him", he had not closed the door to a potential call-up by Colombia in future.

His first action with the Venezuela under-17 side came at a friendly youth tournament in Niigata, Japan, where Venezuela beat the under-18 side of Turkish side Galatasaray, the Turkey under-17 national team, the Japan under-17 national team, a representative side from the Niigata Prefecture and the New Zealand under-17 national team to win the tournament. Despite his earlier comments, in which he stated that he could one day represent Colombia in the future, he stated in an October 2023 interview that "Colombia is already the past, that is already behind us" and that he was "building a new future" with Venezuela.

=== Senior ===
On 6 December 2023, Profeta was called up to the Venezuela full side for a friendly against Colombia, where the squad was composed mainly of under-23 players. He made his full international debut five days later, coming on as a second-half substitute for Jesús Bueno in the 1–0 loss at the DRV PNK Stadium in Fort Lauderdale, Florida.

== Style of play ==
Profeta is most known for playing as a defensive midfielder but has also played as a central defender, left-back or winger.

== Career statistics ==
=== Club ===
As of 24 December 2023.

Appearances and goals by club, season and competition
Club	Season	League			Cup		Continental		Other		Total	
Club	Season	Division	Apps	Goals	Apps	Goals	Apps	Goals	Apps	Goals	Apps	Goals
Deportivo Cali	2023	Categoría Primera A	2	0	0	0	–		0	0	2	0
Career total			2	0	0	0	0	0	0	0	2	0

=== International ===
As of matches played 24 December 2023.

National team	Year	Apps	Goals
Venezuela	2023	1	0
Total		1	0

== Honours ==
Santos U20

- Campeonato Paulista Sub-20: 2025
