= 2013 Slavic Cup =

The 2013 Slavic Cup is a regional invitational tournament for national teams in women's association football. The tournament was held from 7 to 11 March 2013 in the Croatian cities of Rovinj and Poreč.

== Group stage ==
=== Group A ===
Pos	Team	Pld	W	D	L	GF	GA	GD	Pts
1	Russia	2	2	0	0	2	0	+2	6
2	Bosnia and Herzegovina	2	1	0	1	4	2	+2	3
3	Slovakia	2	0	0	2	1	5	−4	0

7 March 2013

Russia	1–0	Bosnia and Herzegovina
14' Elena Terekhova

8 March 2013

Slovakia	1–4	Bosnia and Herzegovina
61' Lucia Ondrušová		7' Milena Nikolić; 19' Lidija Kuliš; 23' Milena Nikolić; 24' Amela Kršo

9 March 2013

Russia	1–0	Slovakia
89' Natalia Shlyapina

=== Group B ===
Pos	Team	Pld	W	D	L	GF	GA	GD	Pts
1	Czech Republic	2	1	1	0	6	2	+4	4
2	Slovenia	2	1	0	1	3	5	−2	3
3	Croatia	2	0	1	1	1	3	−2	1

7 March 2013

Croatia	1–1	Czech Republic

8 March 2013

Slovenia	2–0	Croatia

9 March 2013

Slovenia	1–5	Czech Republic

== Fifth Place ==
11 March 2013

Croatia	1–0	Slovakia
31' Kristina Šundov

== Third Place ==
11 March 2013

Slovenia	1–1	Bosnia and Herzegovina
Penalties
	6-5

== Final ==
11 March 2013

Russia	0–0	Czech Republic
Penalties
	4-3
