= Istria Cup =

- Founded: 2013
- Region: Croatia
- Teams: 6
- Current champions: Slovenia

The Istria Cup is an annual invitational women's football tournament, hosted by Croatia since 2013, in the Istria region of Croatia. It is held at the same time of the year as the Algarve Cup, the Arnold Clark Cup, the Cup of Nations, the Cyprus Women's Cup, the Pinatar Cup, the SheBelieves Cup, the Tournoi de France, the Turkish Women's Cup and the Women's Revelations Cup. The format of competition varies from year to year.

== History ==
Year	Winners	Runners-up	Third place	Fourth place
2013	Russia	Czech Republic	Slovenia	Bosnia and Herzegovina
2014	Belarus	There were no placement matches, and there were two group winners.		
2014	Chinese Taipei	There were no placement matches, and there were two group winners.		
2015	Poland	Slovakia	Austria	France B
2016	United States under-23	Eight teams participated in two groups. There were no placement matches. The final standings are the same as group standings. United States under-23 team earned 7 points, more than any other team.		
2016	Hungary B	Eight teams participated in two groups. There were no placement matches. The final standings are the same as group standings. United States under-23 team earned 7 points, more than any other team.		
2017	Slovakia	Bosnia and Herzegovina	France B	Northern Ireland
2018	Not held			
2019	Slovenia	Serbia	Ukraine	Bosnia and Herzegovina
