= Liced Serna =

Colombian footballer (born 2002)

Personal information
- Full name: Liced Carolina Serna Flórez
- Date of birth: 1 February 2002 (age 24)
- Place of birth: Medellín, Colombia
- Height: 1.72 m (5 ft 7 1/2 in)
- Position: Midfielder

Team information
- Current team: AEK Athens

Senior career*
Years	Team	Apps	(Gls)
2015–2019	Formas Íntimas		
2019–2022	Independiente Medellín		
2022–2024	Valencia	14	(0)
2024–2025	Fundación Albacete	21	(0)
2025–2026	UNAM	14	(0)
2026–	AEK Athens		

International career^{‡}
2022	Colombia U-20	10	(2)
2022–	Colombia	2	(0)
Medal record
Women's football
Representing Colombia
Copa América Femenina
Silver medal – second place	2025 Ecuador
Bolivarian Games
Gold medal – first place	2022 Valledupar	Team
South American Under-20 Women's Football Championship
Runner-up	2022 Chile
- * Club domestic league appearances and goals as of 11 September 2026 ‡ National team caps and goals as of 11 April 2023

Liced Carolina Serna Flórez (born 1 February 2002) is a Colombian professional footballer who plays as a midfielder for Greek A Division side AEK Athens and the Colombia women's national team.

== Club career ==
Serna began her career at Independiente Medellín in 2021, remaining there for the following year. In the 2022–23 season, she signed for Liga F club Valencia.

In September 2026, Serna agreed terms with Greek A Division giants AEK Athens.

== International career ==
Serna made her senior international debut in a friendly against Costa Rica on 3 September 2022. She was also a youth international for Colombia, having played for the U-20 team. As part of the U-20 squad, she competed in the Bolivarian Games and was part of that team that won the gold medal.

== Honours ==
Colombia U-20

- Bolivarian Games gold medal: 2022
- South American Under-20 Women's Football Championship runner-up: 2022
