= 2023 Women's Revelations Cup =

Tournament details
- Host country: Mexico
- City: León, Guanajuato
- Dates: 15–21 February
- Teams: 4 (from 3 confederations)
- Venue(s): 1 (in 1 host city)

Final positions
- Champions: Mexico (1st title)
- Runners-up: Colombia
- Third place: Nigeria
- Fourth place: Costa Rica

Tournament statistics
- Matches played: 6
- Goals scored: 9 (1.5 per match)
- Top scorer(s): (Mexico) Kiana Palacios (2 goals)
- Best player(s): (Colombia) Linda Caicedo
- Best goalkeeper: (Colombia) Katherine Tapia
- Fair play award: Mexico

The 2023 Women's Revelations Cup was the second edition of the Women's Revelations Cup, an international invitational women's football tournament organized by the Mexican Football Federation. Unlike the previous 2022 edition, the 2023 edition presented senior national teams. It was held in León, Mexico from 15 to 21 February 2023.

Host Mexico won the tournament after ending with the same number of points (5) and goal difference (+1) as Colombia, but with fewer yellow cards received (3 vs. 6).

== Venue ==
All matches were played at Estadio León in León, Guanajuato.

León
Estadio León
Capacity: 31,297
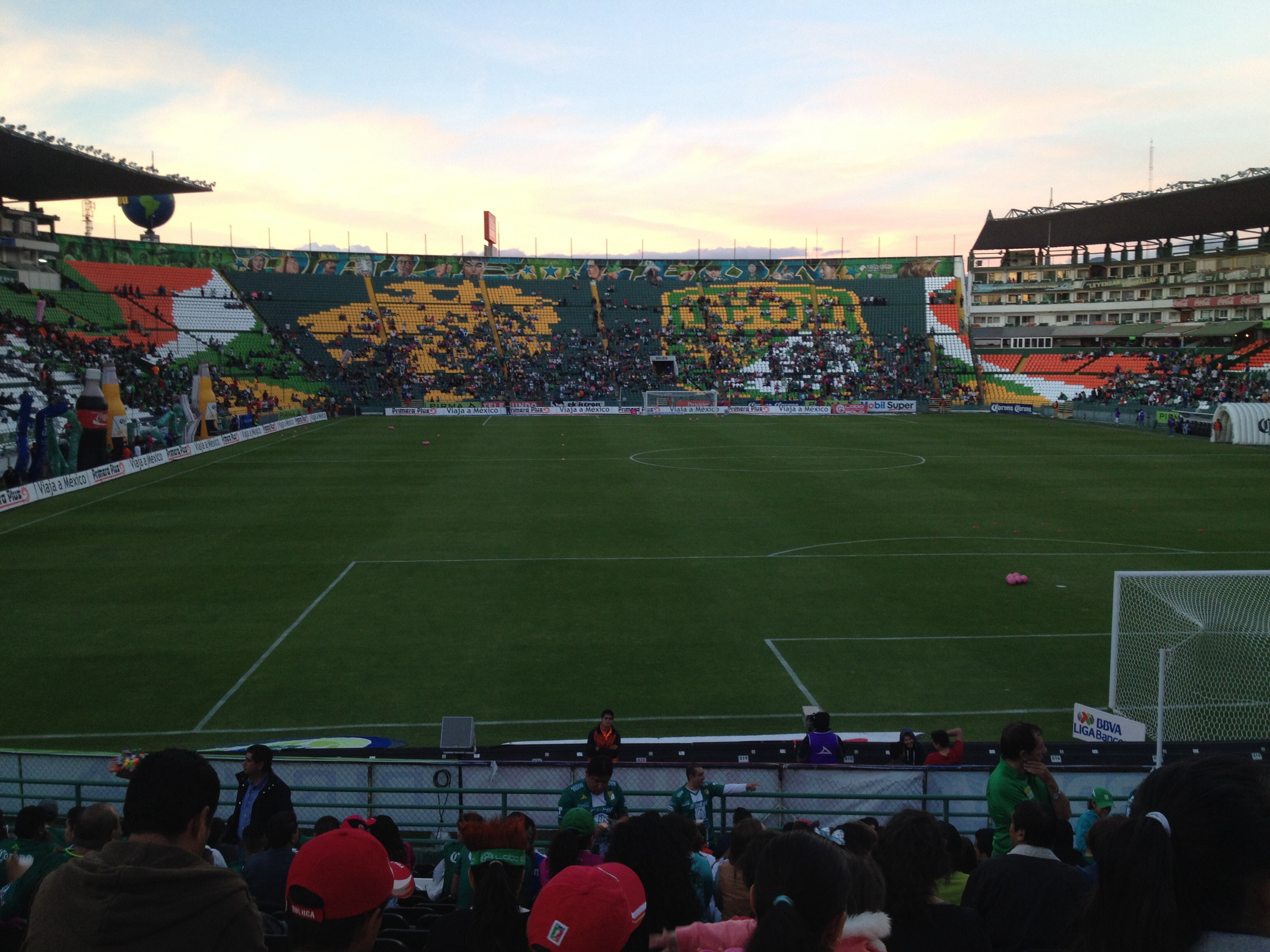

== Format ==
The four invited teams played a round-robin tournament. Points awarded in the group stage followed the formula of three points for a win, one point for a draw, and zero points for a loss. A tie in points was decided by goal differential.

== Teams ==
| Team | FIFA Rankings (December 2022) |
|---|---|
| Colombia | 27 |
| Mexico | 35 |
| Costa Rica | 37 |
| Nigeria | 45 |

== Standings ==
| Pos | Team | Pld | W | D | L | GF | GA | GD | Pts |
|---|---|---|---|---|---|---|---|---|---|
| 1 | Mexico (H, C) | 3 | 1 | 2 | 0 | 3 | 2 | +1 | 5 |
| 2 | Colombia | 3 | 1 | 2 | 0 | 3 | 2 | +1 | 5 |
| 3 | Nigeria | 3 | 1 | 0 | 2 | 1 | 2 | −1 | 3 |
| 4 | Costa Rica | 3 | 0 | 2 | 1 | 2 | 3 | −1 | 2 |

Rules for classification: 1) points; 2) goal difference; 3) goals scored; 4) head-to-head points; 5) head-to-head goal difference; 6) head-to-head number of goals scored; 7) Fair play points in all group matches; 8) FIFA ranking.
(C) Champions; (H) Hosts

== Results ==
All times are local (UTC−5).

15 February 2023
13:00

| Costa Rica | 1–1 | Colombia |
|---|---|---|
| Chinchilla 45+1' | Report | Rodríguez 56' (o.g.) |

Estadio León, León
15 February 2023
16:00

| Mexico | 1–0 | Nigeria |
|---|---|---|
| Palacios 85' | Report |

Estadio León, León
Referee: Natalie Simon (United States)

18 February 2023
13:00

| Colombia | 1–0 | Nigeria |
|---|---|---|
| Caicedo 5' | Report |

Estadio León, León
18 February 2023
16:00

| Mexico | 1–1 | Costa Rica |
|---|---|---|
| Palacios 31' | Report | K. Rodríguez 47' (o.g.) |

Estadio León, León
Referee: Astrid Gramajo (Guatemala)

21 February 2023
17:00

| Nigeria | 1–0 | Costa Rica |
|---|---|---|
| Okoronkwo 44' | Report |

Estadio León, León
21 February 2023
20:00

| Mexico | 1–1 | Colombia |
|---|---|---|
| Mayor 20' | Report | Usme 12' |

Estadio León, León
Referee: Marianela Araya (Costa Rica)

== Goalscorers ==
There were 9 goals scored in 6 matches, for an average of 1.5 goals per match.

2 goals

- (Mexico) Kiana Palacios

1 goal

- (Colombia) Linda Caicedo
- (Colombia) Catalina Usme
- (Costa Rica) Priscila Chinchilla
- (Mexico) Stephany Mayor
- (Nigeria) Esther Okoronkwo

1 own goal

- (Costa Rica) Lixy Rodríguez (against Colombia)
- (Mexico) Karina Rodríguez (against Costa Rica)
