= 2020 Tournoi de France =

First edition of the Tournoi de France

Tournament details
- Host country: France
- Dates: 4–10 March
- Teams: 4 (from 3 confederations)
- Venue: 2 (in 2 host cities)

Final positions
- Champions: France (1st title)
- Runners-up: Netherlands
- Third place: Canada
- Fourth place: Brazil

Tournament statistics
- Matches played: 6
- Goals scored: 12 (2 per match)
- Attendance: 31,264 (5,211 per match)
- Top scorer(s): (France) Valérie Gauvin (2 goals)

The 2020 Tournoi de France was the first edition of the Tournoi de France, an invitational women's football tournament held in France. It took place from 4 to 10 March 2020.

== Venues ==
Calais	Valenciennes
Stade de l'Épopée	Stade du Hainaut
Capacity: 12,432	Capacity: 25,000
2020 Tournoi de France is located in France

== Teams ==
Team	FIFA Rankings (December 2019)
Netherlands	3
France	4
Canada	8
Brazil	9

== Standings ==
Pos	Team	Pld	W	D	L	GF	GA	GD	Pts
1	France (H, C)	3	2	1	0	5	3	+2	7
2	Netherlands	3	0	3	0	3	3	0	3
3	Canada	3	0	2	1	2	3	−1	2
4	Brazil	3	0	2	1	2	3	−1	2

Rules for classification: 1) points; 2) goal difference; 3) goals scored; 4) head-to-head result; 5) FIFA ranking.
(C) Champions; (H) Hosts

== Results ==
All times are local (UTC+1).

4 March 2020
17:00

France	1–0	Canada
Asseyi 54'	Report

Stade de l'Épopée, Calais
Attendance: 7,054
Referee: Riem Hussein (Germany)
4 March 2020
19:00

Netherlands	0–0	Brazil
	Report

Stade du Hainaut, Valenciennes
Attendance: 6,199
Referee: Victoria Beyer (France)

7 March 2020
19:00

Canada	0–0	Netherlands
	Report

Stade de l'Épopée, Calais
Attendance: 989
Referee: Florence Guillemin (France)
7 March 2020
21:00

France	1–0	Brazil
Gauvin 55'	Report

Stade du Hainaut, Valenciennes
Attendance: 17,022
Referee: Marta Huerta de Aza (Spain)

10 March 2020
19:00

Brazil	2–2	Canada
Marta 8'; Ludmila 18'	Report	Matheson 74'; Beckie 87'

Stade de l'Épopée, Calais
Attendance: 0 (Note: The match between Brazil and Canada in Calais was played behind closed doors due to an outbreak of coronavirus in France.)
Referee: Stéphanie Frappart (France)
10 March 2020
21:00

France	3–3	Netherlands
Gauvin 45'; Mbock Bathy 59' (pen.); Sarr 90+4'	Report	Wilms 29'; Spitse 33' (pen.); Martens 73'

Stade du Hainaut, Valenciennes
Attendance: 0 (Note: The match between France and Netherlands in Valenciennes was played behind closed doors due to an outbreak of coronavirus in France.)
Referee: Anastasia Pustovoitova (Russia)

== Goalscorers ==
There were 12 goals scored in 6 matches, for an average of 2 goals per match.

2 goals

- (France) Valérie Gauvin

1 goal

- (Brazil) Ludmila
- (Brazil) Marta
- (Canada) Janine Beckie
- (Canada) Diana Matheson
- (France) Viviane Asseyi
- (France) Griedge Mbock Bathy
- (France) Ouleymata Sarr
- (Netherlands) Lieke Martens
- (Netherlands) Sherida Spitse
- (Netherlands) Lynn Wilms
