= UEFA Women's Player of the Year Award =

Association football award

UEFA Women's Player of the Year
- Sponsored by: ESM
- Presented by: UEFA
- Formerly called: UEFA Best Women's Player in Europe (2013–2016); UEFA Women's Player of the Year (2017–2023)
- First award: 2013
- Final award: 2023

Highlights
- Most wins: (Denmark) Pernille Harder (Spain) Alexia Putellas (2 awards each)
- Website: uefa.com

The UEFA Women's Player of the Year Award (previously known as the UEFA Best Women's Player in Europe Award) was an association football award given to the female footballer that is considered the best player playing for a football club in Europe during the previous season. The award was announced in 2013, two years after the creation of the UEFA Best Player in Europe Award, the equivalent award for male footballers.

Nadine Angerer, Lena Goeßling, and Lotta Schelin made the shortlist for the inaugural year, with Nadine Angerer being selected as the winner on 5 September 2013 during the round of 32 and 16 draws for the 2013–14 UEFA Women's Champions League.

== Criteria and voting ==
According to UEFA, players are selected based on their performances that year in "all competitions, both domestic and international, and at club and national team levels". For the inaugural award, players were nominated by the coaches of the twelve national teams that made the group stage of the UEFA Women's Euro 2013 competition and the coaches of the eight club teams that made the quarterfinals of the 2012–13 UEFA Women's Champions League. The nominees were then voted on by eighteen sports journalists that cover women's association football, chosen by trade organization European Sports Media. Each of the voters selected their pick for the top three players, giving their first choice five points, their second choice three points, and their third choice one point. From this initial round of voting, a three player shortlist is selected and the fourth through tenth-place finishers are determined. The winner, runner up, and third-place finisher are selected from the shortlist during a second round of voting, which takes place during the round of 32 and 16 draws for the UEFA Women's Champions League.

== Award history ==
=== Winners ===
Season	1st	2nd	3rd
UEFA Best Women's Player in Europe Award
2012–13	(Germany) Nadine Angerer (Frankfurt)	(Germany) Lena Goeßling (VfL Wolfsburg)	(Sweden) Lotta Schelin (Lyon)
2013–14	(Germany) Nadine Keßler (VfL Wolfsburg)	(Germany) Martina Müller (VfL Wolfsburg)	(Sweden) Nilla Fischer (VfL Wolfsburg)
2014–15	(Germany) Célia Šašić (Frankfurt)	(France) Amandine Henry (Lyon)	(Germany) Dzsenifer Marozsán (Frankfurt)
2015–16	(Norway) Ada Hegerberg (Lyon)	(France) Amandine Henry (Lyon)	(Germany) Dzsenifer Marozsán (Frankfurt)
UEFA Women's Player of the Year Award
2016–17	(Netherlands) Lieke Martens (Barcelona)	(Denmark) Pernille Harder (VfL Wolfsburg)	(Germany) Dzsenifer Marozsán (Lyon)
2017–18	(Denmark) Pernille Harder (VfL Wolfsburg)	(Norway) Ada Hegerberg (Lyon)	(France) Amandine Henry (Lyon)
2018–19	(England) Lucy Bronze (Lyon)	(Norway) Ada Hegerberg (Lyon)	(France) Amandine Henry (Lyon)
2019–20	(Denmark) Pernille Harder (VfL Wolfsburg)	(France) Wendie Renard (Lyon)	(England) Lucy Bronze (Lyon)
2020–21	(Spain) Alexia Putellas (Barcelona)	(Spain) Jenni Hermoso (Barcelona)	(Netherlands) Lieke Martens (Barcelona)
2021–22	(Spain) Alexia Putellas (Barcelona)	(England) Beth Mead (Arsenal)	(Germany) Lena Oberdorf (VfL Wolfsburg)
2022–23	(Spain) Aitana Bonmatí (Barcelona)	(Australia) Sam Kerr (Chelsea)	(Spain) Olga Carmona (Real Madrid)

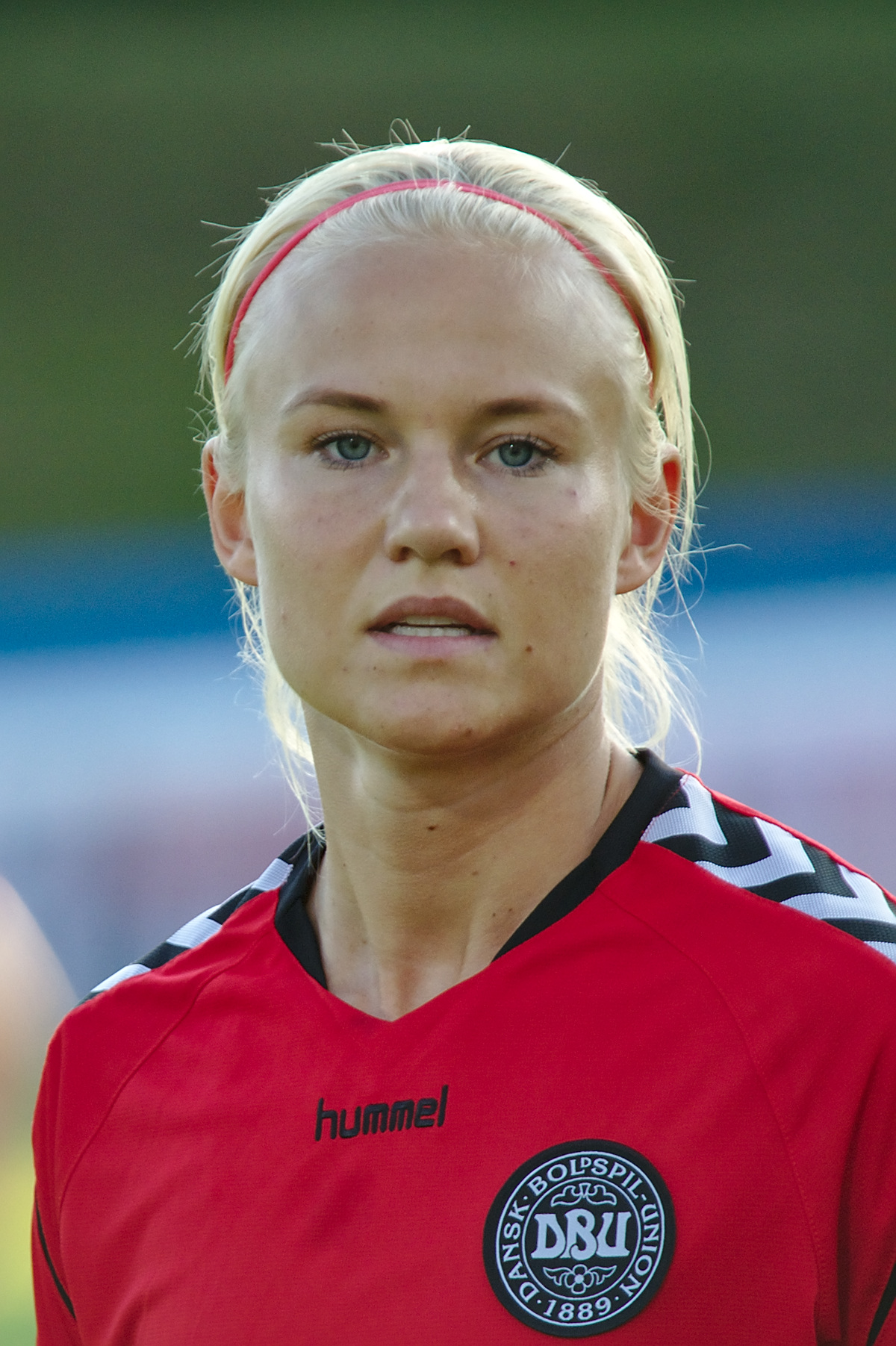
Pernille Harder, first player to win the award twice.

==== By player ====
Rank	Player	First place	Second place	Third place
1	(Denmark) Pernille Harder	2	1	0
2	(Spain) Alexia Putellas	2	0	0
3	(Norway) Ada Hegerberg	1	2	0
4	(England) Lucy Bronze	1	0	1
4	(Netherlands) Lieke Martens	1	0	1
6	(Germany) Nadine Angerer	1	0	0
6	(Germany) Nadine Keßler	1	0	0
6	(Germany) Célia Šašić	1	0	0
6	(Spain) Aitana Bonmatí	1	0	0
10	(France) Amandine Henry	0	2	2
11	(Germany) Lena Goeßling	0	1	0
11	(Germany) Martina Müller	0	1	0
11	(France) Wendie Renard	0	1	0
11	(Spain) Jenni Hermoso	0	1	0
11	(England) Beth Mead	0	1	0
11	(Australia) Sam Kerr	0	1	0
17	(Germany) Dzsenifer Marozsán	0	0	3
18	(Sweden) Lotta Schelin	0	0	1
18	(Sweden) Nilla Fischer	0	0	1
18	(Germany) Lena Oberdorf	0	0	1
18	(Spain) Olga Carmona	0	0	1

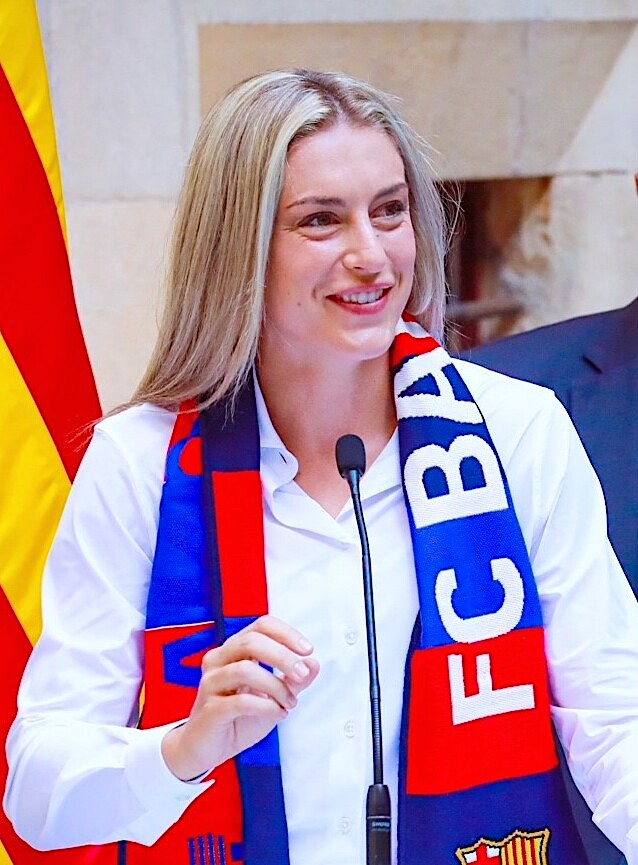
Alexia Putellas, first player to win the award twice in a row.

==== By country ====
Rank	Country	First place	Second place	Third place
1	Germany	3	2	4
2	Spain	3	1	1
3	Denmark	2	1	0
4	Norway	1	2	0
5	England	1	1	1
6	Netherlands	1	0	1
7	France	0	3	2
8	Australia	0	1	0
9	Sweden	0	0	2

==== By club ====
Rank	Club	First place	Second place	Third place
1	(Spain) Barcelona	4	1	1
2	(Germany) VfL Wolfsburg	3	3	2
3	(France) Lyon	2	5	5
4	(Germany) Frankfurt	2	0	2
5	(England) Arsenal	0	1	0
5	(England) Chelsea	0	1	0
7	(Spain) Real Madrid	0	0	1

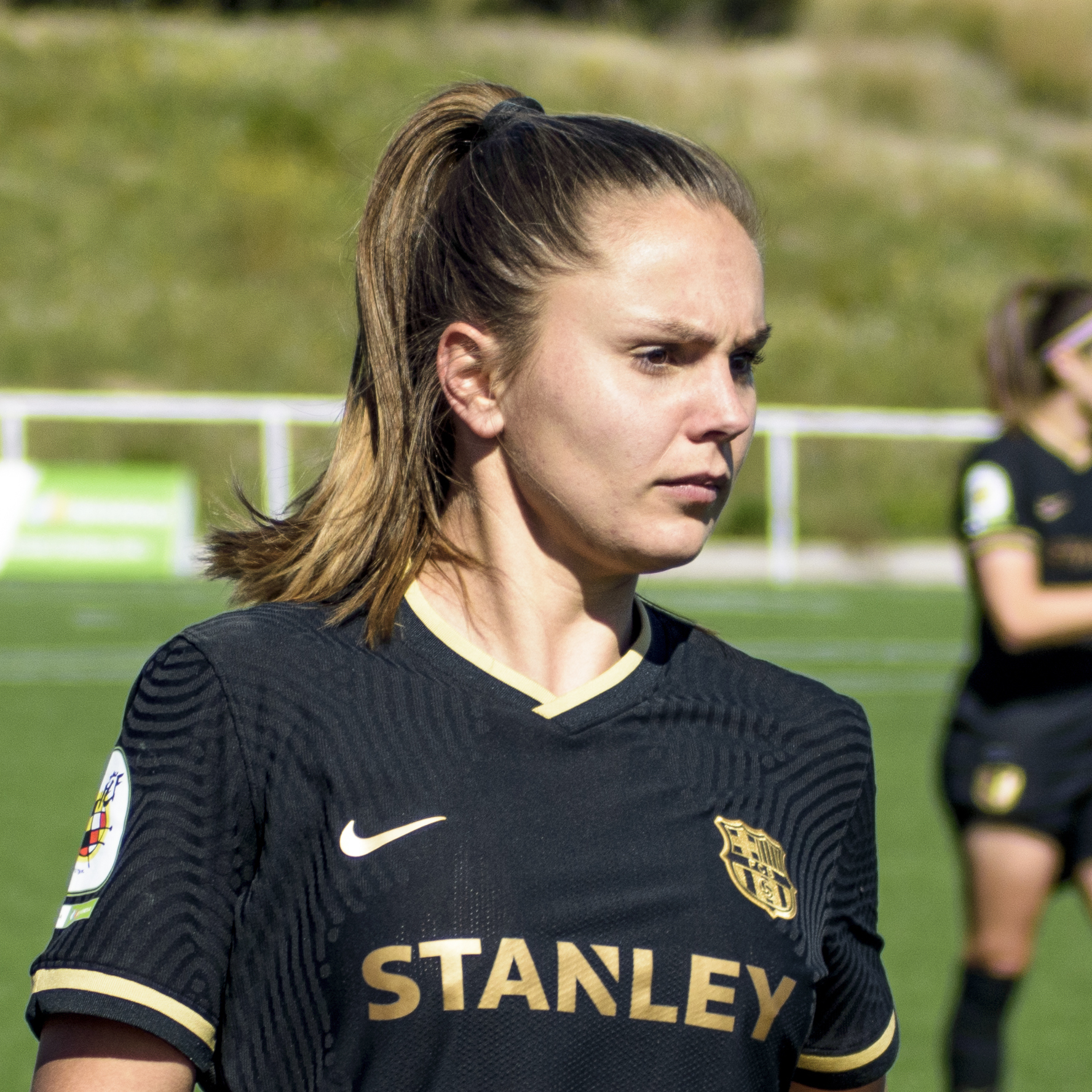
Lieke Martens received the award when she helped the Netherlands win the Euro 2017.

=== Finalists ===
Winner Shortlisted

==== 2012–13 ====
Rank	Player	First round	Final round	Club
1	(Germany) Nadine Angerer	–	10	(Germany) Frankfurt
2	(Germany) Lena Goeßling	–	6	(Germany) VfL Wolfsburg
3	(Sweden) Lotta Schelin	–	2	(France) Lyon
4	(Germany) Nadine Keßler	16	–	(Germany) VfL Wolfsburg
5	(Spain) Verónica Boquete	11	–	(Sweden) Tyresö
6	(Sweden) Caroline Seger	8	–	(Sweden) Tyresö
7	(Sweden) Nilla Fischer	6	–	(Sweden) Linköping
8	(Germany) Célia Okoyino da Mbabi	4	–	(Germany) Frankfurt
9	(France) Wendie Renard	3	–	(France) Lyon
10	(France) Louisa Nécib	2	–	(France) Lyon

==== 2013–14 ====
Rank	Player	First round	Final round	Club
1	(Germany) Nadine Keßler	–	9	(Germany) VfL Wolfsburg
2	(Germany) Martina Müller	–	3	(Germany) VfL Wolfsburg
3	(Sweden) Nilla Fischer	–	0	(Germany) VfL Wolfsburg
4	(Germany) Lena Goeßling	6	–	(Germany) VfL Wolfsburg
5	(Spain) Verónica Boquete	5	–	(Sweden) Tyresö
5	(Sweden) Lotta Schelin	5	–	(France) Lyon
7	(Brazil) Marta	3	–	(Sweden) Tyresö FF
7	(Germany) Alexandra Popp	3	–	(Germany) VfL Wolfsburg
7	(Sweden) Caroline Seger	3	–	(Sweden) Tyresö FF
10	(United States) Christen Press	2	–	(Sweden) Tyresö FF

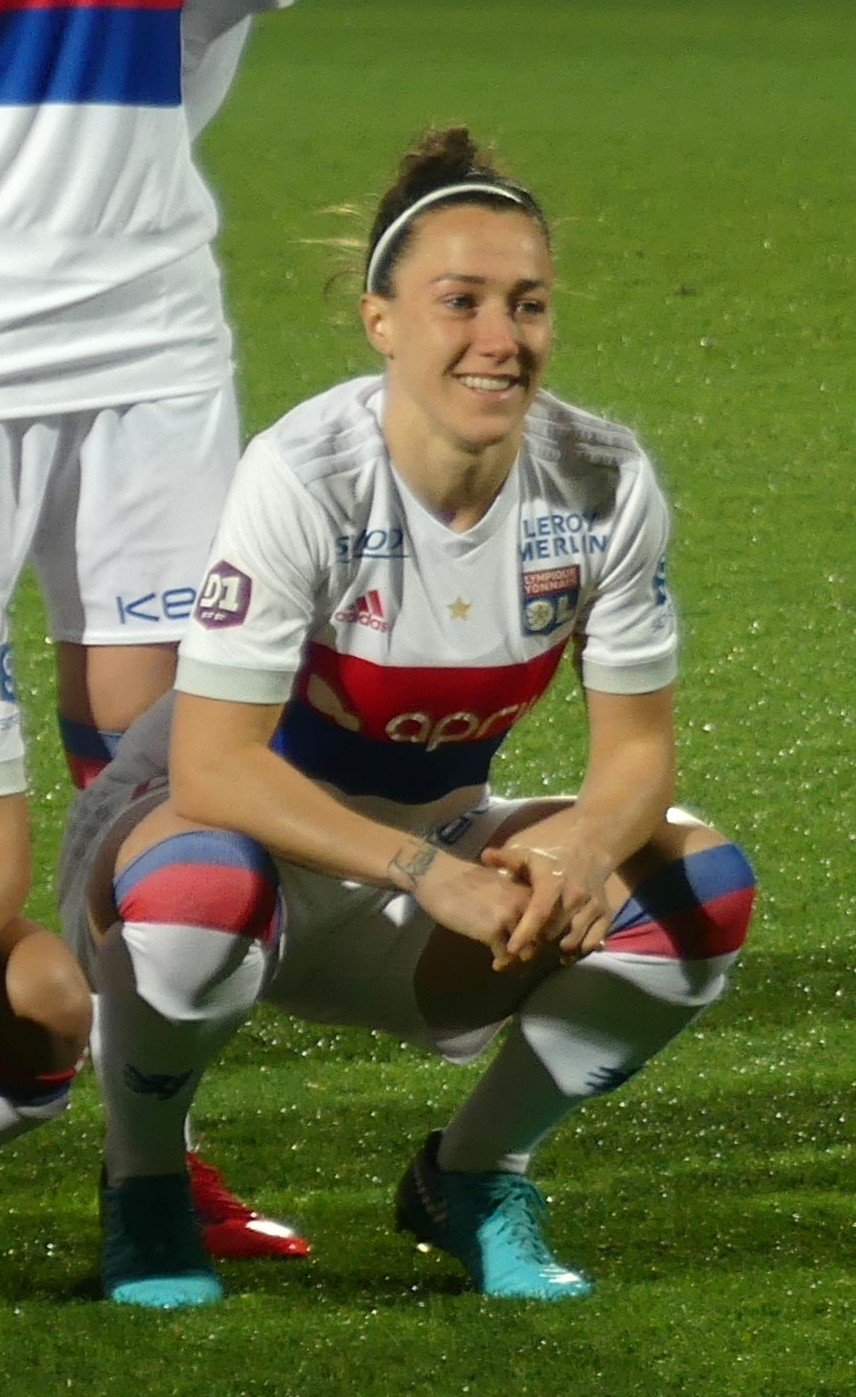
Lucy Bronze was called "the best player in the world" in 2019.

==== 2014–15 ====
Rank	Player	First round	Final round	Club
1	(Germany) Célia Šašić	–	11	(Germany) Frankfurt
2	(France) Amandine Henry	–	4	(France) Lyon
3	(Germany) Dzsenifer Marozsán	–	3	(Germany) Frankfurt
4	(Spain) Verónica Boquete	8	–	(Germany) Frankfurt
4	(Germany) Anja Mittag	8	–	(Sweden) Rosengård
6	(France) Eugénie Le Sommer	7	–	(France) Lyon
7	(Switzerland) Ramona Bachmann	6	–	(Sweden) Rosengård
8	(France) Wendie Renard	4	–	(France) Lyon
9	(Sweden) Caroline Seger	3	–	(France) Paris Saint-Germain
10	(Germany) Nadine Angerer	2	–	(United States) Portland Thorns
10	(Germany) Simone Laudehr	2	–	(Germany) Frankfurt
12	(Germany) Alexandra Popp	0	–	(Germany) VfL Wolfsburg

==== 2015–16 ====
Rank	Player	First round	Final round	Club
1	(Norway) Ada Hegerberg	–	13	(France) Lyon
2	(France) Amandine Henry	–	4	(France) Lyon
3	(Germany) Dzsenifer Marozsán	–	3	(Germany) Frankfurt
4	(Japan) Saki Kumagai	11	–	(France) Lyon
5	(France) Wendie Renard	10	–	(France) Lyon
6	(France) Louisa Nécib	9	–	(France) Lyon
6	(Germany) Alexandra Popp	9	–	(Germany) VfL Wolfsburg
8	(France) Camille Abily	6	–	(France) Lyon
9	(France) Eugénie Le Sommer	3	–	(France) Lyon
10	(France) Amel Majri	2	–	(France) Lyon

==== 2016–17 ====
Rank	Player	First round	Final round	Club
1	(Netherlands) Lieke Martens	–	95	(Spain) Barcelona
2	(Denmark) Pernille Harder	–	81	(Germany) VfL Wolfsburg
3	(Germany) Dzsenifer Marozsán	–	47	(France) Lyon
4	(Netherlands) Vivianne Miedema		–	(Germany) Bayern Munich
5	(France) Eugénie Le Sommer		–	(France) Lyon
6	(France) Wendie Renard		–	(France) Lyon
7	(Netherlands) Jackie Groenen		–	(Germany) Frankfurt
8	(England) Lucy Bronze		–	(England) Manchester City
9	(England) Jodie Taylor		–	(England) Arsenal
10	(Netherlands) Shanice van de Sanden		–	(England) Liverpool

==== 2017–18 ====
Rank	Player	First round	Final round	Club
1	(Denmark) Pernille Harder	–	106	(Germany) VfL Wolfsburg
2	(Norway) Ada Hegerberg	–	61	(France) Lyon
3	(France) Amandine Henry	–	41	(France) Lyon
4	(Germany) Dzsenifer Marozsán	32	–	(France) Lyon
5	(England) Lucy Bronze	20	–	(France) Lyon
6	(Netherlands) Lieke Martens	17	–	(Spain) Barcelona
7	(France) Wendie Renard	16	–	(France) Lyon
8	(England) Fran Kirby	15	–	(England) Chelsea
9	(France) Eugénie Le Sommer	13	–	(France) Lyon
10	(Netherlands) Shanice van de Sanden	7	–	(France) Lyon

==== 2018–19 ====
Rank	Player	First round	Final round	Club
1	(England) Lucy Bronze	–	88	(France) Lyon
2	(Norway) Ada Hegerberg	–	56	(France) Lyon
3	(France) Amandine Henry	–	44	(France) Lyon
4	(Netherlands) Vivianne Miedema	31	–	(England) Arsenal
5	(England) Ellen White	22	–	(England) Birmingham City
6	(Denmark) Pernille Harder	21	–	(Germany) VfL Wolfsburg
7	(Germany) Dzsenifer Marozsán	12	–	(France) Lyon
8	(Norway) Caroline Graham Hansen	10	–	(Germany) VfL Wolfsburg
9	(Netherlands) Lieke Martens	9	–	(Spain) Barcelona
9	(France) Wendie Renard	9	–	(France) Lyon

==== 2019–20 ====
Rank	Player	First round	Final round	Club
1	(Denmark) Pernille Harder	–	92	(Germany) VfL Wolfsburg
2	(France) Wendie Renard	–	81	(France) Lyon
3	(England) Lucy Bronze	–	28	(France) Lyon
4	(Netherlands) Vivianne Miedema	26	–	(England) Arsenal
5	(France) Delphine Cascarino	24	–	(France) Lyon
6	(France) Eugénie Le Sommer	13	–	(France) Lyon
7	(Norway) Ada Hegerberg	11	–	(France) Lyon
7	(France) Amel Majri	11	–	(France) Lyon
9	(France) Marie-Antoinette Katoto	8	–	(France) Paris Saint-Germain
10	(Germany) Dzsenifer Marozsán	7	–	(France) Lyon

==== 2020–21 ====
Rank	Player	First round	Final round	Club
1	(Spain) Alexia Putellas	–	50	(Spain) Barcelona
2	(Spain) Jenni Hermoso	–	42	(Spain) Barcelona
3	(Netherlands) Lieke Martens	–	40	(Spain) Barcelona
4	(Netherlands) Vivianne Miedema	32	–	(England) Arsenal
5	(Spain) Aitana Bonmatí	29	–	(Spain) Barcelona
6	(Norway) Caroline Graham Hansen	28	–	(Spain) Barcelona
7	(Australia) Sam Kerr	18	–	(England) Chelsea
7	(England) Fran Kirby	18	–	(England) Chelsea
9	(Denmark) Pernille Harder	17	–	(England) Chelsea
10	(Spain) Irene Paredes	11	–	(France) Paris Saint-Germain

==== 2021–22 ====
Rank	Player	First round	Final round	Club
1	(Spain) Alexia Putellas	–	97	(Spain) Barcelona
2	(England) Beth Mead	–	84	(England) Arsenal
3	(Germany) Lena Oberdorf	–	47	(Germany) VfL Wolfsburg
4	(Germany) Alexandra Popp	35	–	(Germany) VfL Wolfsburg
5	(Spain) Aitana Bonmatí	25	–	(Spain) Barcelona
6	(England) Keira Walsh	18	–	(England) Manchester City
7	(England) Leah Williamson	17	–	(England) Arsenal
8	(Norway) Ada Hegerberg	12	–	(France) Lyon
8	(France) Wendie Renard	12	–	(France) Lyon
10	(Germany) Lina Magull	10	–	(Germany) Bayern Munich
11	(France) Delphine Cascarino	9	–	(France) Lyon
12	(France) Amandine Henry	8	–	(France) Lyon
12	(Spain) Mapi León	8	–	(Spain) Barcelona
14	(Germany) Tabea Waßmuth	6	–	(Germany) VfL Wolfsburg
15	(France) Selma Bacha	5	–	(France) Lyon
15	(England) Mary Earps	5	–	(England) Manchester United
17	(France) Sakina Karchaoui	4	–	(France) Paris Saint-Germain
17	(France) Marie-Antoinette Katoto	4	–	(France) Paris Saint-Germain
19	(Germany) Merle Frohms	2	–	(Germany) Eintracht Frankfurt
20	(Sweden) Fridolina Rolfö	1	–	(Spain) Barcelona
21	(Chile) Christiane Endler	0	–	(France) Lyon
21	(Germany) Marina Hegering	0	–	(Germany) Bayern Munich

==== 2022–23 ====
Rank	Player	First round	Final round	Club
1	(Spain) Aitana Bonmatí	–	308	(Spain) Barcelona
2	(Australia) Sam Kerr	–	88	(England) Chelsea
3	(Spain) Olga Carmona	–	72	(Spain) Real Madrid
4	(England) Mary Earps	55	–	(England) Manchester United
5	(Spain) Salma Paralluelo	48	–	(Spain) Barcelona
5	(Germany) Alexandra Popp	48	–	(Germany) VfL Wolfsburg
7	(England) Keira Walsh	24	–	(Spain) Barcelona
8	(Norway) Caroline Graham Hansen	11	–	(Spain) Barcelona
9	(England) Rachel Daly	8	–	(England) Aston Villa
10	(Poland) Ewa Pajor	5	–	(Germany) VfL Wolfsburg
11	(France) Kadidiatou Diani	4	–	(France) Paris Saint-Germain

== See also ==
- List of sports awards honoring women
