= Gabriela Rodríguez (footballer) =

Colombian footballer (born 2005)

Personal information
- Full name: Gabriela Rodríguez Salazar
- Date of birth: 10 May 2005 (age 21)
- Place of birth: Santander de Quilichao, Colombia
- Height: 1.57 m (5 ft 2 in)
- Position: Attacking midfielder

Team information
- Current team: Cruzeiro

Youth career
- Toritos FC

Senior career*
Years	Team	Apps	(Gls)
2020–2024	América de Cali	48	(11)
2025–	Cruzeiro	26	(4)

International career^{‡}
2022	Colombia U17	6	(1)
2022–2024	Colombia U20	23	(8)
2021–	Colombia	2	(0)
Medal record
Women's football
Representing Colombia
Bolivarian Games
Gold medal – first place	2022 Valledupar	Team
Copa América Femenina
Silver medal – second place	2022 Colombia	Team
FIFA U-17 Women's World Cup
Silver medal – second place	2022 India	Team
South American Under-17 Women's Football Championship
Silver medal – second place	2022 Uruguay	Team
- * Club domestic league appearances and goals as of 3 April 2026 ‡ National team caps and goals as of 3 April 2026

Gabriela Rodríguez Salazar (born 10 May 2005) is a Colombian footballer who plays as an attacking midfielder for Série A1 club Cruzeiro and the Colombia women's national team.

Rodríguez came through América de Cali, winning the Liga Femenina in 2022, and made her senior international debut in 2021 at the age of 15. She was a runner-up with Colombia at the 2022 FIFA U-17 Women's World Cup and the 2022 Copa América Femenina, and finished as leading scorer at the 2022 Bolivarian Games. In January 2025 she joined Cruzeiro, becoming part of the squad that reached the Brasileirão Feminino final and won the Campeonato Mineiro in her first season.

== Early life ==
Rodríguez was born on 10 May 2005 in Santander de Quilichao, in the Cauca Department, and was schooled in Cali. She comes from a footballing family: her father, Bernardo Rodríguez Pérez, played as a midfielder for clubs including Atlético Huila and Deportivo Cali, and her mother is Lorena Salazar.

She began playing at Toritos FC in her home town, where her father coached, and initially played in goal before moving outfield. Her parents encouraged her towards other sports—her mother favoured skating—but she persisted with football and was recruited by the Atlas school run by Carolina Pineda after appearing in tournaments in Cali. She has said she would like to study medicine, but set that aside on joining América de Cali.

== Club career ==
=== América de Cali ===
Rodríguez joined América de Cali in 2020 and established herself in the first team while still a teenager, developing alongside the Colombia international Catalina Usme. She won the Liga Femenina with the club in 2022 and played in the Copa Libertadores Femenina. She made 48 league appearances and scored 11 goals across five seasons before leaving in January 2025.

=== Cruzeiro ===
On 10 January 2025 Rodríguez was presented by the Brazilian club Cruzeiro, one of 14 players unveiled by the Belo Horizonte side ahead of the 2025 Brasileirão Feminino. Marking her departure from América, she said the club had given her "many memories I will always carry in my heart".

She scored the winner against Fluminense on 26 March 2025, a late finish from a rebound that took Cruzeiro to the top of the table. Cruzeiro went on to the most successful season in the department's history, winning the Campeonato Mineiro unbeaten, qualifying for the Copa Libertadores Femenina for the first time, and losing the Brasileirão final to Corinthians after a 2–2 draw at the Estádio Independência and a 1–0 defeat at the Neo Química Arena. By April 2026 she had made 26 appearances for Cruzeiro, scoring four goals.

== International career ==
=== Youth ===
Rodríguez was a member of the Colombia side that finished runner-up at the 2022 South American U-17 Women's Championship in Uruguay and then at the 2022 FIFA U-17 Women's World Cup in India, where Colombia lost the final to Spain. The same group won the 2022 Women's Revelations Cup in Mexico.

She also played for the under-20 side at the 2022 FIFA U-20 Women's World Cup in Costa Rica. At the 2024 South American Under-20 Women's Football Championship she scored seven goals in eight matches—close to half of Colombia's 17—including braces against Chile and Bolivia and goals against Brazil, Venezuela and Argentina, finishing among the tournament's three leading scorers. Colombia placed third in the final hexagonal behind Brazil and Paraguay. She was named in Colombia's squad for the 2024 FIFA U-20 Women's World Cup, staged on home soil.

=== Senior ===
Rodríguez made her senior international debut aged 15, in a friendly against Ecuador on 13 April 2021. On 3 July 2022 she was named by Nelson Abadía in Colombia's squad for the 2022 Copa América Femenina, which the hosts finished as runners-up. Later that year she won gold at the 2022 Bolivarian Games in Valledupar, where she was the tournament's leading scorer.

Assigned the number 10 shirt, she has been described as a central creative player for Colombia. She was called up for the CONMEBOL Women's Nations League in October 2025 and again in April 2026, when she and her Cruzeiro teammate Lorena Bedoya were selected for fixtures against Venezuela, Chile and Argentina.

== Honours ==
América de Cali

- Liga Femenina: 2022

Cruzeiro

- Campeonato Mineiro: 2025
- Campeonato Brasileiro de Futebol Feminino Série A1 runner-up: 2025

Colombia U17

- FIFA U-17 Women's World Cup runner-up: 2022
- South American U-17 Women's Championship runner-up: 2022
- Women's Revelations Cup: 2022

Colombia

- Bolivarian Games gold medal: 2022
- Copa América Femenina runner-up: 2022

Individual

- Bolivarian Games top scorer: 2022
