= 2021 Tournoi de France =

Second edition of the Tournoi de France

Tournament details
- Host country: France
- Dates: Cancelled; Original schedule: 17–23 February
- Teams: 4 (from 1 confederation)
- Venues: 2 (in 2 host cities)

The 2021 Tournoi de France was scheduled to be the second edition of the Tournoi de France, an international women's football tournament held annually in France and organized by the French Football Federation.

While the organization of the tournament seemed uncertain due to the COVID-19 pandemic, the FFF announced that the tournament would happen on 26 January 2021, unlike England which canceled the tournament it was planning on hosting. The matches were scheduled to be played behind closed doors. On 9 and 10 February 2021, Norway and Iceland announced their withdrawal from the competition, due to the COVID-19 pandemic in Europe.

On 11 February, the FFF announced that they have decided to cancel the tournament and France would play two friendly matches against Switzerland on 20 and 23 February.

== Teams ==
Team	FIFA Rankings (December 2020)
France	3
~~Norway~~	11
~~Iceland~~	16
Switzerland	19

== Venues ==
Metz	Sedan
Stade Saint-Symphorien	Stade Louis Dugauguez
Capacity : 20,400	Capacity : 24,389
2021 Tournoi de France is located in France
