= 2024 Women's Amputee Football World Cup =

Tournament details
- Host country: Colombia
- City: Barranquilla
- Dates: 4–10 November 2024
- Teams: 10 (12 planned)
- Venue: 2 (in 1 host city)

Final positions
- Champions: Colombia
- Runners-up: United States
- Third place: Poland
- Fourth place: Kenya

Tournament statistics
- Matches played: 25
- Goals scored: 51 (2.04 per match)
- Top scorer: (England) Annabel Kiki

The 2024 Women's Amputee Football World Cup was a WAFF tournament held in Barranquilla, Colombia from 4 to 10 November 2024. Games were held at Romelio Martínez Stadium and San Isidro Stadium. This inaugural amputee football event was the first time that women had competed separately from men.

The event was streamed live at YouTube.

== Participating nations ==
12 nation were slated to compete in the World Cup. Cameroon and Nigeria withdrew, leaving 10 nations:

Groups
Group A	Group B	Group C
Brazil	England	Ecuador
Colombia (host)	Haiti	Ukraine
Poland	Kenya	United States
Cameroon (withdrawn)	Peru	Nigeria (withdrawn)

== Preliminary round ==
=== Group A ===
Team	Pld	W	D	L	GF	GA	GD	P
Colombia	2	2	0	0	5	0	+5	6
Poland	2	1	0	1	5	1	+4	3
Brazil	2	0	0	2	0	9	-9	0

4 November 2024
21:00 (UTC-05:00)	Colombia	(Colombia)	1 - 0	(Poland)	Poland
5 November 2024
16:00 (UTC-05:00)	Brazil	(Brazil)	0 - 5	(Poland)	Poland
6 November 2024
17:30 (UTC-05:00)	Colombia	(Colombia)	4 - 0	(Brazil)	Brazil

=== Group B ===
Team	Pld	W	D	L	GF	GA	GD	P
Kenya	3	2	1	0	3	0	+3	7
England	3	2	0	1	7	1	+6	6
Peru	3	1	0	2	0	8	-8	3
Haiti	3	0	1	2	0	1	-1	1

4 November 2024
9:30 (UTC-05:00)	Peru	(Peru)	0 - 6	(England)	England
16:00 (UTC-05:00)	Haiti	(Haiti)	0 - 0	(Kenya)	Kenya
5 November 2024
9:30 (UTC-05:00)	Kenya	(Kenya)	2 - 0	(Peru)	Peru
17:30 (UTC-05:00)	England	(England)	1 - 0	(Haiti)	Haiti
6 November 2024
9:30 (UTC-05:00)	Kenya	(Kenya)	1 - 0	(England)	England
9:30 (UTC-05:00)	Peru	(Peru)	0 - 0 (forfeit)	(Haiti)	Haiti

=== Group C ===
Team	Pld	W	D	L	GF	GA	GD	P
USA	2	2	0	0	9	0	+9	6
Ecuador	2	1	0	1	2	6	-4	3
Ukraine	2	0	0	2	1	6	-5	0

4 November 2024
9:30 (UTC-05:00)	Ecuador	(Ecuador)	2 - 1	(Ukraine)	Ukraine
5 November 2024
9:30 (UTC-05:00)	USA	(United States)	4 - 0	(Ukraine)	Ukraine
6 November 2024
16:00 (UTC-05:00)	USA	(United States)	5 - 0	(Ecuador)	Ecuador

=== 3rd placed ranking ===
Group	Team	Pld	W	D	L	GF	GA	GD	P
C	Ukraine	2	0	0	2	1	6	-5	0
B	Peru	2	0	0	2	0	8	-8	0
A	Brazil	2	0	0	2	0	9	-9	0

Two first teams advanced to quarterfinals, while the last one went to 9th place game.

== Knockout stage ==
Quarterfinals
C1	United States	0 (2)
B2	England	0 (1)
A2	Poland	1
C2	Ecuador	0
A1	Colombia	4
B3	Peru	0
B1	Kenya	1
C3	Ukraine	0

Semifinals
C1	United States	0 (3)
A2	Poland	0 (1)
A1	Colombia	1
B1	Kenya	0

Gold medal
C1	United States	1 (1)
A1	Colombia	1 (2)
Bronze medal
A2	Poland	1
B1	Kenya	0

Positions 5-8
B2	England	3
C2	Ecuador	0
B3	Peru	0 (0)
C3	Ukraine	0 (2)

5th place
B2	England	2
C3	Ukraine	0
7th place
C2	Ecuador	2
B3	Peru	0

Games
Game	Date	Stage	Start time (CST)	Country 1	Country 2	Final score
1	8 Nov	9th place game	0830	Brazil	Haiti	2-0
2	8 Nov	Quarterfinals	0830	Kenya	Ukraine	1-0
3	8 Nov	Quarterfinals	1500	United States	England	0-0 P[2-1]
4	8 Nov	Quarterfinals	1500	Poland	Ecuador	1-0
5	8 Nov	Quarterfinals	1630	Colombia	Peru	4-0
6	9 Nov	5-8 place playoff	0830	Ukraine	Peru	0-0 P[2-0]
7	9 Nov	5-8 place playoff	0830	England	Ecuador	3-0
8	9 Nov	Semifinals	1630	United States	Poland	0-0 P[3-1]
9	9 Nov	Semifinals	1800	Colombia	Kenya	1-0
10	10 Nov	7th place game	0830	Ecuador	Peru	2-0
11	10 Nov	5th place game	0830	England	Ukraine	2-0
12	10 Nov	3rd place game	1700	Poland	Kenya	1-0
13	10 Nov	Final	1830	United States	Colombia	1-1 P[1-2]

== Rankings ==
Rank	Team
1	Colombia
2	United States
3	Poland
4	Kenya
5	England
6	Ukraine
7	Ecuador
8	Peru
9	Brazil
10	Haiti

2024 Women's Amputee Football World Cup

Colombia
1st title

== See also ==
- Amputee Football World Cup
