= Paloma Bustamante =

Chilean footballer

Personal information
- Full name: Paloma Aracely Bustamante Duarte
- Date of birth: 7 December 2005 (age 20)
- Place of birth: Santiago, Chile
- Position: Attacking midfielder

Team information
- Current team: Palestino
- Number: 23

Youth career
- 2017–2021: Colo-Colo

Senior career*
Years	Team	Apps	(Gls)
2022–2024	Colo-Colo		
2024	→ Palestino (loan)	11	(7)
2025–	Palestino		

International career^{‡}
2022	Chile U17	10	(0)
2023	Chile U19	2	(3)
2024–	Chile	1	(1)
- * Club domestic league appearances and goals as of 17 January 2025 ‡ National team caps and goals as of 6 March 2024

Paloma Aracely Bustamante Duarte (born 7 December 2005) is a Chilean footballer who plays as an attacking midfielder for Palestino in the Chilean Primera División and the Chile women's national team.

== Club career ==
Bustamante began to play football in Estación Central commune, Santiago de Chile, and joined the Colo-Colo youth system in 2017, winning the national championship at under-17 level in 2018. She made her debut with the first team in 2022. In 2024, Bustamante joined on loan to Palestino

Ended her contract with Colo-Colo, Bustamante signed her first professional contract with Palestino in January 2025.

== International career ==
Bustamante represented Chile at under-17 level in both the 2022 South American Championship and the 2022 FIFA World Cup. At under-19 level, she made two appearances and scored three goals against Peru in August 2023.

She also took part in a training microcycle of Chile at under-23 level.

At senior level, she received her first call up for the matches against Jamaica on 23 and 27 February 2024 and made her debut in the first match, a 5–1 win, scoring a goal at the minute 88.
