= Women's Revelations Cup =

Football tournament

- Organiser(s): Mexican Football Federation
- Founded: 20 July 2022; 4 years ago
- Teams: 4
- Current champions: Mexico (1st title)
- Most championships: Colombia; Mexico (1 title each)
- Website: Official website
- 2023 Women's Revelations Cup

The Women's Revelations Cup is an international invitational women's football tournament organized by the Mexican Football Federation that is held in Mexico. The tournament was announced to the public on 20 July 2022, and the first edition (2022) was held in the City of León, Guanajuato from 31 August – 6 September 2022, contested by four nations that were preparing for the 2022 FIFA U-17 Women's World Cup in India: Canada, Chile, Colombia, and host Mexico. Beginning with the 2023 edition, the tournament will include senior women's national teams.

The Women's Revelations Cup is a tournament similar to the Algarve Cup, the Arnold Clark Cup, the Cup of Nations, the Cyprus Women's Cup, the Istria Cup, the Pinatar Cup, the SheBelieves Cup, the Tournoi de France and the Turkish Women's Cup.

The current champion is Mexico, who won the 2023 edition.

== Tournament Format ==
The four invited teams play in a round-robin tournament. Points awarded in the group stage followed the formula of three points for a win, one point for a draw, and zero points for a loss. A tie in points would be decided by goal differential; other tie-breakers are used as needed in the following order: goal difference, goals scored, head-to-head result, and a fair play score based on the number of yellow and red cards.

== Results ==
Year
Year	Winner	Runner-up	Third place	Fourth place
2022	Colombia	Mexico	Chile	Canada
2023	Mexico	Colombia	Nigeria	Costa Rica

== Participating nations ==
Team	2022	2023	Years
Canada U17	4th	—	1
Chile U17	3rd	—	1
Colombia	—	2nd	1
Colombia U17	1st	—	1
Costa Rica	—	4th	1
Mexico	—	1st	1
Mexico U17	2nd	—	1
Nigeria	—	3rd	1
Total	4	4	
