= Tournoi de France (women's football) =

Football tournament

- Founded: 2020
- Abolished: 2023
- Teams: 4
- Last champions: France (3rd title)
- Most championships: France (3 titles)

The Tournoi de France was an invitational tournament for national teams in women's football hosted by the French Football Federation (FFF).

It was played in late February or early March, at the same time as the Algarve Cup, the Arnold Clark Cup, the Cup of Nations, the Cyprus Women's Cup, the Istria Cup, the Pinatar Cup, the SheBelieves Cup, the Turkish Women's Cup and the Women's Revelations Cup. In April 2023, FFF decided to discontinue the tournament following the introduction of the UEFA Women's Nations League.

== Format ==
The four invited teams play in a round-robin tournament. Points awarded in the group stage followed the formula of three points for a win, one point for a draw, and zero points for a loss. A tie in points would be decided by goal differential; other tie-breakers are used as needed.

== Results ==
Year	Host city	Champions	Runners-up	Third place	Fourth place
2020	Calais and Valenciennes	France	Netherlands	Canada	Brazil
~~2021~~	Cancelled due to COVID-19 pandemic				
2022	Caen and Le Havre	France	Netherlands	Brazil	Finland
2023	Laval and Angers	France	Denmark	Norway	Uruguay

== Statistics ==
=== Participating nations ===
Team	2020	2021	2022	2023	Years
France	1st	Can.^{1}	1st	1st	3
Brazil	4th		3rd		2
Canada	3rd				1
Denmark				2nd	1
Finland			4th		1
Iceland		Can.^{1}			0
Netherlands	2nd		2nd		2
Norway		Can.^{1}		3rd	1
Switzerland		Can.^{1}			0
Uruguay				4th	1
Total	4	4	4	4	—

^{1} Tournament cancelled.

=== All-time table ===
Rank	Team	Tourn.	Pld	W	D	L	GF	GA	Dif	Win %	Pts
1	France	3	9	7	2	0	21	6	+15	77.78	23
2	Netherlands	2	6	1	4	1	8	7	+1	16.67	7
3	Denmark	1	3	2	0	1	5	3	+2	66.67	6
4	Norway	1	3	1	1	1	1	2	−1	33.33	4
5	Brazil	2	6	0	4	2	4	6	−2	0.00	4
6	Canada	1	3	0	2	1	2	3	−1	0.00	2
7	Finland	1	3	0	1	2	0	8	−8	0.00	1
8	Uruguay	1	3	0	0	3	3	9	−6	0.00	0

=== Top goalscorers ===
Rank	Name	Total
1	(France) Marie-Antoinette Katoto	4
1	(France) Wendie Renard	4
3	(Brazil) Marta	3
4	(France) Valérie Gauvin	2
4	(Netherlands) Lineth Beerensteyn	2
4	(Netherlands) Katja Snoeijs	2

== See also ==
- Tournoi de France, a men's football competition
