= Fernando Viveros =

Chilean constituent

Member of the Constitutional Council
- In office 7 June 2023 – 7 November 2023
- Constituency: Coquimbo Region

Personal details
- Born: 12 November 1981 (age 44) Talcahuano, Chile
- Party: Communist Party
- Parent(s): Luis Viveros; Hilda Reyes
- Education: Latin American School of Medicine in Cuba (BA)
- Profession: Physician

Fernando Viveros Reyes (born 12 November 1981) is a Chilean politician who served in the Constitutional Council.

== Biography ==
Viveros was born in Talcahuano on 12 November 1981. His parents are Luis Antonio Viveros Viveros and Hilda del Carmen Reyes Zúñiga.

He completed his secondary education at the Liceo Enrique Molina Garmendia in Concepción in 1999. He studied medicine at the Latin American School of Medicine (ELAM) in Cuba.

He is the founder of free community medical clinics in the neighbourhoods of Tierras Blancas, Sindempart, and the upper sector of Coquimbo. After nearly ten years working in this initiative, he participated in a humanitarian mission in the Republic of Haiti and later worked for seven years providing medical services at the La Serena Prison.

== Political career ==
Viveros began his political activity in 1997 as a student leader.

Between 2016 and 2021, he served as a municipal councillor of the commune of Coquimbo representing the Communist Party of Chile. In 2021, he ran for mayor of Coquimbo but was not elected. He subsequently served as Regional Ministerial Secretary (SEREMI) of the Ministry General Secretariat of Government for the Coquimbo Region between 2022 and 2023.

In the elections held on 7 May 2023, Viveros ran as a candidate for the Constitutional Council representing the 5th electoral district of the Coquimbo Region, as a member of the Communist Party of Chile within the Unidad para Chile electoral pact. According to the Electoral Qualification Court (TRICEL), he was elected with 31,280 votes.
