= María Contreras =

Guatemalan footballer (born 1998)

María Fernanda Contreras Muñoz
Personal information
- Full name: María Fernanda Contreras Muñoz
- Date of birth: 8 November 1998 (age 28)
- Place of birth: Guatemala City, Guatemala
- Height: 1.58 m (5 ft 2 in)
- Position: Midfielder

Youth career
- 2012–2014: Asociación Pares Unifut
- 2014–2017: Montverde Academy

College career
Years	Team	Apps	(Gls)
2017–2021	The Citadel Bulldogs	90	(10)

Senior career*
Years	Team	Apps	(Gls)
2022	Haukar	15	(2)
2023	Stomilanki Olsztyn	9	(0)

International career^{‡}
2022–	Guatemala	3	(2)
- * Club domestic league appearances and goals as of 14 October 2023 ‡ National team caps and goals as of 8 April 2022

María Fernanda Contreras Muñoz (born 08 November 1998), commonly known as Mafer Contreras, is a Guatemalan footballer who plays as a midfielder.

== Early life and college ==
Contreras was born in Guatemala City to Erick Contreras and Patricia Muñoz. She later moved to the United States to attend and play soccer at Montverde Academy. In 2017, she enrolled at The Citadel and later captained The Citadel Bulldogs women's soccer team.

== Club career ==
In March 2022, Contreras signed with Icelandic team Haukar.
