= 2026–27 West Ham United F.C. Women season =

West Ham United
2026–27 season
- Head Coach: Rita Guarino
- Stadium: Victoria Road, Dagenham

The 2026–27 West Ham United F.C. Women season is the club's 36th season in existence and their ninth in the Women's Super League, the highest level of the football pyramid. Along with competing in the WSL, the club will also contest two domestic cup competitions: the FA Cup and the Players Cup (previously known as the League Cup).

== Summary ==
On 31 May 2026, it was announced that Tuva Hansen had suffered an ACL injury in the 2026 World Sevens Football tournament.

On 21 July 2026, it was announced that Chris Pipe and Adam Pengelly had been appointed assistant managers of West Ham.

On 27 July 2026, the club faced AFC Wimbledon in a pre-season training fixture. The same day, the club announced that Oona Siren had signed a new contract with the club.

== Current squad ==
As of 26 August 2026

No.	Nat	Name	Date of birth (age)	Signed from	Since
Goalkeepers
14	(France)	Constance Picaud	5 July 1998 (age 28)	(France) Fleury	2026
25	(Republic of Ireland)	Megan Walsh	12 November 1994 (age 32)	(England) Brighton & Hove Albion	2023
45	(England)	Rebekah Dowsett	31 May 2007 (age 19)	(England) Leicester	2025
Defenders
2	(Japan)	Yu Endo	29 October 1997 (age 29)	(Japan) Urawa Reds	2025
3	(Spain)	Laia Codina	22 January 2000 (age 26)	(England) Arsenal	2026
5	(Norway)	Tuva Hansen	4 August 1997 (age 29)	(Germany) Bayern	2026
7	(Algeria)	Inès Belloumou	21 June 2001 (age 25)	(Germany) Bayern	2024
12	(England)	Ria Bose	7 February 2006 (age 20)	(Portugal) Sporting	2026
13	(Finland)	Eva Nyström	29 November 1999 (age 26)	(Sweden) Hammarby	2025
15	(Norway)	Ylinn Tennebø	10 January 2000 (age 26)	(Norway) Vålerenga	2026
22	(Switzerland)	Nadine Riesen	11 April 2000 (age 26)	(Germany) Eintracht Frankfurt	2026
26	(England)	Niamh Peacock	22 March 2008 (age 18)	(England) Arsenal	2026
28	(France)	Estelle Cascarino	5 February 1997 (age 29)	(Italy) Juventus	2026
43	(Turkey)	Selin Cemal	27 December 2006 (age 19)	Academy	2025
Midfielders
8	(Japan)	Saki Kumagai	17 October 1990 (age 36)	(England) London City Lionesses	2026
4	(Finland)	Oona Siren	23 February 2001 (age 25)	(Norway) LSK Kvinner	2024
10	(England)	Katie Zelem	20 January 1996 (age 30)	(England) London City Lionesses	2026
19	(England)	Sienna Wareing	18 December 2007 (age 18)	(England) Manchester United	2026
33	(Turkey)	Halle Houssein	11 December 2004 (age 21)	(England) Arsenal	2022
Forwards
9	(Japan)	Riko Ueki	30 July 1999 (age 27)	(Japan) Tokyo Verdy Beleza	2023
11	(France)	Kelly Gago	5 January 1999 (age 27)	(England) Everton	2026
17	(England)	Ebony Salmon	27 January 2001 (age 25)	(England) Aston Villa	2026
20	(France)	Viviane Asseyi	20 November 1993 (age 33)	(Germany) Bayern	2022
21	(England)	Sarah Brasero-Carreira	1 September 2004 (age 22)	(Portugal) Estoril	2025
23	(Wales)	Ffion Morgan	11 May 2000 (age 26)	(England) Bristol City	2025
27	(Switzerland)	Leila Wandeler	11 April 2006 (age 20)	(France) OL Lyonnes	2025
77	(Switzerland)	Seraina Piubel	1 June 2000 (age 26)	(Switzerland) FC Zürich	2024

== Women's Super League ==
=== League table ===
Pos	Team	Pld	W	D	L	GF	GA	GD	Pts
7	Brighton & Hove Albion	11	4	2	5	17	16	+1	14
8	Aston Villa	11	3	5	3	12	17	−5	14
9	West Ham United	11	4	1	6	11	19	−8	13
10	Liverpool	11	3	3	5	17	16	+1	12
11	Everton	11	3	3	5	8	11	−3	12

Updated to match(es) played on 22 November 2026. Source: Women's Super League Table
Rules for classification: 1) Points; 2) Goal difference; 3) Number of goals scored.

=== Matches ===
Win Draw Loss Fixtures

6 September 2026 1	Tottenham Hotspur	3–1	West Ham United	Leyton
12:00 BST	Gaupset 18'; Hanson 30', 74'	Report	Asseyi 90+3'	Stadium: Brisbane Road; Attendance: 1,675; Referee: Abigail Byrne

12 September 2026 2	West Ham United	2–1	London City Lionesses	Dagenham
12:45 BST	Gago 21', (yellow card) 79'; Asseyi 48'	Report	van de Donk 74'; Geyoro (yellow card) 75'	Stadium: Victoria Road; Attendance: 1,638; Referee: Richard Eley

20 September 2026 3	West Ham United	0–1	Everton	Dagenham
14:00 BST	Cascarino (yellow card) 40'; Asseyi (yellow card) 90'	Report	van Gool (yellow card) 34'; Codina , 90+4' (o.g.)	Stadium: Chigwell Construction Stadium; Referee: Phoebe Cross

27 September 2026 4	Manchester United	2–1	West Ham United	Leigh
13:00 BST	Terland 9'; Medina 72'	Report	Asseyi 90+2' (pen.)	Stadium: Leigh Sports Village; Attendance: 2,959; Referee: Callum Jones

4 October 2026 5	West Ham United	0–3	Chelsea	Dagenham
14:00 BST		Report	Kaptein (yellow card) 32'; Malard 38'; Walsh 80'; Hamano 87'	Stadium: Victoria Road; Referee: Sophie Dennington

18 October 2026 6	Crystal Palace	0–1	West Ham United	Sutton
14:00 BST	Lloyd-Smith (yellow card) 32'; Napier (yellow card) 56'; Enge (yellow card) 59'	Report	Gago 30'; Codina (yellow card) 77'	Stadium: Gander Green Lane; Referee: Lisa Benn

24 October 2026 7	Brighton & Hove Albion	3–0	West Ham United	Falmer
17:15 BST	Symonds 29'; García (yellow card) 56'; Kirby 63'; Seike 66'	Report		Stadium: Falmer Stadium; Attendance: 4,373; Referee: Grace Lowe

1 November 2026 8	West Ham United	4–1	Liverpool	Dagenham
14:00 GMT	Asseyi 7' (pen.), 62'; Wandeler 15'; Codina 44'; Siren (yellow card) 73'	Report	Kapocs (yellow card) 68'; Endemann 72'	Stadium: Victoria Road; Referee: William Davis

7 November 2026 9	Manchester City	5–0	West Ham United	Manchester
12:45 GMT	Knaak (yellow card) 9'; Shaw 38', 53', 74'; Casparij (yellow card) 59'; Fujino 60'; Beney 68'		Asseyi (yellow card) 45+3'	Stadium: Academy Stadium; Referee: Megan Wilson

15 November 2026 10	West Ham United	2–0	Charlton Athletic	Dagenham
14:00 GMT	Asseyi 43', 53'; Riesen (yellow card) 45+1'	Report	Johnston (yellow card) 45+1'; Flannery (yellow card) 56'; Korhonen (yellow card) 70'	Stadium: Victoria Road; Referee: Abigail Byrne

22 November 2026 11	Arsenal	0–0	West Ham United	Holloway
14:30 GMT	De Almeida (yellow card) 90+2'		Nyström (yellow card) 44'	Stadium: Emirates Stadium; Referee: Lisa Benn

13 December 2026 12	West Ham United	v	Aston Villa	Dagenham
14:00 GMT				Stadium: Victoria Road

20 December 2026 13	West Ham United	v	Birmingham City	Dagenham
14:00 GMT				Stadium: Victoria Road

10 January 2027 14	London City Lionesses	v	West Ham United	Bromley
14:00 GMT				Stadium: Hayes Lane

20 January 2027 15	West Ham United	v	Manchester United	Dagenham
19:00 GMT				Stadium: Victoria Road

24 January 2027 16	Liverpool	v	West Ham United	St Helens
14:00 GMT				Stadium: St Helens Stadium

31 January 2027 17	Everton	v	West Ham United	Dagenham
14:00 GMT				Stadium: Victoria Road

7 February 2027 18	West Ham United	v	Manchester City	Dagenham
14:00 GMT				Stadium: Victoria Road

14 February 2027 19	Charlton Athletic	v	West Ham United	Charlton
14:00 GMT				Stadium: The Valley

14 March 2027 20	West Ham United	v	Brighton & Hove Albion	Dagenham
14:00 GMT				Stadium: Victoria Road

17 March 2027 21	Chelsea	v	West Ham United	Fulham
19:00 GMT				Stadium: Stamford Bridge

28 March 2027 22	West Ham United	v	Tottenham Hotspur	Dagenham
14:00 BST				Stadium: Victoria Road

4 April 2027 23	Birmingham City	v	West Ham United	Birmingham (Bordesley)
14:00 BST				Stadium: St Andrew's

2 May 2027 24	West Ham United	v	Arsenal	Dagenham
14:00 BST				Stadium: Victoria Road

9 May 2027 25	Aston Villa	v	West Ham United	Aston
14:00 BST				Stadium: Villa Park

22 May 2027 26	West Ham United	v	Crystal Palace
12:00 BST

== WSL Players Cup ==
Pos	Grp	Team	Pld	W	PW	PL	L	GF	GA	GD	Pts	Qualification
5	SR	London City Lionesses	5	4	0	0	1	9	4	+5	12	Advance to Knockout Phase
6	SR	Tottenham Hotspur	5	3	0	2	0	15	2	+13	11	Advance to Knockout Phase
7	SR	West Ham United	5	3	1	0	1	9	4	+5	11	Advance to Knockout Phase
8	NR	Aston Villa	5	3	1	0	1	9	6	+3	11	Advance to Knockout Phase
9	SR	Crystal Palace	5	2	1	0	2	9	8	+1	8	

Updated to match(es) played on 18 November 2026. Source: WSL Football
Rules for classification: 1) Points; 2) Goal difference; 3) Number of goals scored; 4) Number of wins; 5) Head-to-head record

Following the competition's restructuring, West Ham were drawn in the Southern Region for the league stage of the competition.

Win Draw Loss Fixtures

23 September 2026 1	Tottenham Hotspur	0–0 (3–4 p)	West Ham United	Leyton
19:00 BST		Report		Stadium: BetWright Stadium; Attendance: 746; Referee: Amy Fearn
	Penalties
	Spence (penalty scored); Dijkstra (penalty missed); Gaupset (penalty scored); Pelova (penalty scored); Martinez (penalty missed)		(penalty scored) Zelem; (penalty scored) Nyström; (penalty scored) Gago; (penalty scored) Codina; (penalty missed) Salmon

30 September 2026 2	West Ham United	3–1	Southampton	Dagenham
19:00 BST	Siren 54', 79'; Wandeler 65'	Report	Brazil 2'	Stadium: Chigwell Construction Stadium; Attendance: 268; Referee: Aimee Keir

21 October 2026 3	West Ham United	1–2	London City Lionesses	Dagenham
19:00 BST	Asseyi 38'	Report	Anyomi 29'; Goodwin 45+3'; Pérez (yellow card) 90+5'	Stadium: Chigwell Construction Stadium; Attendance: 567; Referee: Kirsty Dowle

28 October 2026 4	Charlton Athletic	1–2	West Ham United	Charlton
19:30 GMT	Johnston 68'; Waldie (yellow card) 89'	Report	Morgan 39', 42'; Asseyi (yellow card) 90'	Stadium: The Valley; Attendance: 420; Referee: Amy Fearn

18 November 2026 5	West Ham United	v	Wolverhampton Wanderers	Dagenham
19:00 GMT		Report		Stadium: Chigwell Construction Stadium

16 December 2026 6	Watford	v	West Ham United	Edgware
19:00 GMT		Report		Stadium: The Hive Stadium

== Transfers ==
=== Transfers in ===
Date	Position	Nationality	Name	From	Ref.
22 May 2026	MF	(England)	Katie Zelem	(England) London City Lionesses	
27 May 2026	GK	(France)	Constance Picaud	(France) FC Fleury 91	
19 June 2026	DF	(Spain)	Laia Codina	(England) Arsenal	
22 June 2026	DF	(Switzerland)	Nadine Riesen	(Germany) Eintracht Frankfurt	
7 July 2026	MF	(England)	Sienna Wareing	(England) Manchester United	
9 July 2026	DF	(England)	Niamh Peacock	(England) Arsenal	
10 July 2026	FW	(England)	Ebony Salmon	Free	
17 July 2026	DF	(France)	Estelle Cascarino	(Italy) Juventus	
17 July 2026	FW	(France)	Kelly Gago	(England) Everton	
4 September 2026	MF	(Japan)	Saki Kumagai	(England) London City Lionesses	

=== Transfers out ===
Date	Position	Nationality	Name	To	Ref.
22 May 2026	FW	(Germany)	Shekiera Martinez	(England) Tottenham Hotspur	
17 June 2026	DF	(Canada)	Shelina Zadorsky	(Canada) AFC Toronto	
17 June 2026	DF	(Austria)	Verena Hanshaw	Austria Wien	
17 June 2026	DF	(Chile)	Camila Sáez	(Spain) Valencia	
17 June 2026	MF	(England)	Soraya Walsh	(Scotland) Aberdeen	
17 June 2026	FW	(England)	Emily Taylor-Brown	(England) AFC Wimbledon	
30 June 2026	MF	(Australia)	Katrina Gorry	Career break	
29 July 2026	MF	(Republic of Ireland)	Jessie Stapleton	(England) Leicester City	
29 July 2026	MF	(Republic of Ireland)	Jessica Ziu	(England) Leicester City	
30 July 2026	GK	(Poland)	Kinga Szemik	(Germany) Hamburger SV	
24 August 2026	MF	(England)	Keira Flannery	(England) Charlton Athletic	

=== Loans out ===
Date	Position	Nationality	Name	To	Until	Ref.
29 July 2026	FW	(England)	Sarah Brasero	(Spain) Deportivo Alavés	End of season	
31 July 2026	GK	(England)	Katie O'Hanlon	(Scotland) Aberdeen	End of season	
4 September 2026	DF	(England)	Ria Bose	(England) Sunderland	End of season	

== Squad statistics ==
As of match played 20 September 2026

=== Appearances ===
No.	Pos	Nat	Player	Total		Women's Super League		FA Cup		Players Cup	
No.	Pos	Nat	Player	Apps	Goals	Apps	Goals	Apps	Goals	Apps	Goals
1	GK	(France) FRA	Constance Picaud	3	0	3	0	0	0	0	0
2	DF	(Japan) JPN	Yu Endō	1	0	1	0	0	0	0	0
3	DF	(Spain) ESP	Laia Codina	2	0	2	0	0	0	0	0
4	DF	(Finland) FIN	Oona Siren	2	0	1+1	0	0	0	0	0
5	DF	(Norway) NOR	Tuva Hansen	0	0	0	0	0	0	0	0
7	DF	(Algeria) ALG	Inès Belloumou	3	0	2+1	0	0	0	0	0
8	MF	(Japan) JPN	Saki Kumagai	3	0	2+1	0	0	0	0	0
9	FW	(Japan) JPN	Riko Ueki	3	0	3	0	0	0	0	0
10	MF	(England) ENG	Katie Zelem	3	0	3	0	0	0	0	0
11	FW	(France) FRA	Kelly Gago	3	1	2+1	1	0	0	0	0
12	DF	(England) ENG	Ria Bose	0	0	0	0	0	0	0	0
13	DF	(Finland) FIN	Eva Nyström	1	0	1	0	0	0	0	0
15	DF	(Finland) FIN	Ylinn Tennebø	1	0	0+1	0	0	0	0	0
17	FW	(England) ENG	Ebony Salmon	3	0	1+2	0	0	0	0	0
19	MF	(England) ENG	Sienna Wareing	0	0	0	0	0	0	0	0
20	FW	(France) FRA	Viviane Asseyi	3	2	3	2	0	0	0	0
21	FW	(England) ENG	Sarah Brasero-Carreira	0	0	0	0	0	0	0	0
22	DF	(Switzerland) SUI	Nadine Riesen	3	0	3	0	0	0	0	0
23	FW	(Wales) WAL	Ffion Morgan	0	0	0	0	0	0	0	0
25	GK	(Republic of Ireland) IRL	Megan Walsh	0	0	0	0	0	0	0	0
26	DF	(England) ENG	Niamh Peacock	0	0	0	0	0	0	0	0
27	FW	(Switzerland) SUI	Leila Wandeler	3	0	0+3	0	0	0	0	0
28	DF	(France) FRA	Estelle Cascarino	3	0	3	0	0	0	0	0
33	MF	(Turkey) TUR	Halle Houssein	0	0	0	0	0	0	0	0
43	DF	(Turkey) TUR	Selin Cemal	0	0	0	0	0	0	0	0
45	DF	(England) ENG	Rebekah Dowsett	0	0	0	0	0	0	0	0
77	FW	(Switzerland) SUI	Seraina Piubel	3	0	3	0	0	0	0	0
