= Li Mengwen =

Chinese footballer (born 1995)

Li Mengwen 李梦雯
Personal information
- Date of birth: 28 March 1995 (age 31)
- Place of birth: Suzhou, China
- Height: 1.66 m (5 ft 5 in)
- Position: Right-back

Youth career
- Suzhou
- Jiangsu

Senior career*
Years	Team	Apps	(Gls)
2009–2023	Jiangsu		
2022–2023	→ Paris Saint-Germain (loan)	13	(0)
2023–2025	Brighton & Hove Albion	11	(0)
2024–2025	→ West Ham United (loan)	10	(0)
2025–2026	Rangers	10	(1)

International career^{‡}
2012	China U17	3	(0)
2014	China U20	3	(0)
2019	China U21	1	(0)
2018–	China	35	(2)
Medal record
Women's football
Representing China
Asian Games
Silver medal – second place	2018 Palembang	Team
AFC Women's Asian Cup
Winner	2022 India
EAFF E-1 Championship
Runner-up	2022 Japan
Third place	2019 South Korea
AFC U-19 Women's Championship
Third place	2013 China
AFC U-16 Women's Asian Championship
Third place	2011 China
- * Club domestic league appearances and goals as of 17:20, 31 July 2026 (UTC) ‡ National team caps and goals as of 20 April 2025

Li Mengwen (Chinese: 李梦雯; pinyin: Lǐ Mèngwén; IPA: [lì mə̂ŋwə̌n]; born 28 March 1995) is a Chinese professional footballer who as a right-back for the China national team.

== Club career ==
Li started her senior club career with Jiangsu. On 2 September 2022, she joined French club Paris Saint-Germain on a season long loan deal.

On 1 September 2023, Brighton & Hove Albion announced the signing of Li. In September 2024, Li joined West Ham United on loan for the 2024–25 season. On 18 June 2025, Brighton announced that her contract was terminated by mutual consent.

On 18 September 2025, Li joined Rangers for the 2025–26 season. In June 2026, Rangers announced that Li had departed the club.

== International career ==
After playing for various age level national teams, Li made her senior team debut for China on 20 August 2018 in a 16–0 Asian Games win against Tajikistan. In July 2021, she was named in the squad for the 2020 Olympics.

In January 2022, Li was named in the squad for the 2022 AFC Women's Asian Cup. She played three matches in the tournament as China went on to win their ninth continental title.

== Personal life ==
Li's father was a long-distance runner. Following her father's footsteps, she was a 400-metre athlete before switching her focus to football.

== Career statistics ==
=== Club ===
As of match played 20 April 2025

Appearances and goals by club, season and competition
Club	Season	League			National Cup		League Cup		Continental		Total	
Club	Season	Division	Apps	Goals	Apps	Goals	Apps	Goals	Apps	Goals	Apps	Goals
Paris Saint-Germain (loan)	2022–23	Division 1 Féminine	13	0	5 (Note: Appearances in Coupe de France)	0	0	0	4	0	22	0
Brighton & Hove Albion	2023–24	Women's Super League	11	0	2 (Note: Appearances in Women's FA Cup)	0	2	0	—		15	0
West Ham United (loan)	2024–25	Women's Super League	10	0	1	0	5	0	—		16	0
Rangers	2025–26	SWPL	0	0	0	0	0	0	—		0	0
Career total			34	0	8	0	7	0	4	0	53	0

=== International ===
As of match played 7 April 2025

Appearances and goals by national team and year
National team	Year	Apps	Goals
China	2018	1	0
China	2019	5	0
China	2020	0	0
China	2021	4	0
China	2022	4	0
China	2023	9	0
China	2024	5	0
China	2025	4	2
Total		34	2

Scores and results list China's goal tally first, score column indicates score after each Li goal.

List of international goals scored by Li Mengwen
No.	Date	Venue	Opponent	Score	Result	Competition
1	22 February 2025	Pinatar Arena, San Pedro del Pinatar, Spain	Chinese Taipei	3–0	4–0	2025 Pinatar Cup
2	5 April 2025	Yongchuan Sports Center, Chongqing, China	Uzbekistan	3–0	5–0	2025 Yongchuan International Tournament

== Honours ==
Jiangsu

- Chinese Women's Super League: 2019
- Chinese Women's Cup: 2017, 2018, 2019
- Chinese Women's League Cup: 2018, 2019
- Chinese Women's Super Cup: 2019

China

- Asian Games silver medalist: 2018; bronze medalist: 2022
- AFC Women's Asian Cup: 2022
- EAFF E-1 Championship runner-up: 2022
