= Leila Wandeler =

Swiss footballer (born 2006)

- Wandeler in 2026

Personal information
- Date of birth: 11 April 2006 (age 20)
- Place of birth: Fribourg, Switzerland
- Position: Forward

Team information
- Current team: West Ham United
- Number: 27

Youth career
- 2016–2021: FC Corminboeuf
- 2021: FC Central FR
- 2021–2022: BSC YB
- 2022–2023: FC Central FR
- 2023–2024: Lyon

Senior career*
Years	Team	Apps	(Gls)
2024	Lyon B	4	(0)
2024–2025	Lyon	3	(1)
2025–	West Ham United	28	(1)

International career^{‡}
2021–2022	Switzerland U16	3	(0)
2021–2023	Switzerland U17	15	(6)
2025	Switzerland U19	3	(2)
2025–	Switzerland	13	(0)
- * Club domestic league appearances and goals as of 21:00, 8 November 2026 (UTC) ‡ National team caps and goals as of 14 October 2026

Leila Wandeler (Swiss Standard German: [ˈlɛi̯lɐ ˈvandələr]; born 11 April 2006) is a Swiss professional footballer who plays as a forward for Women's Super League club West Ham United and the Switzerland national team.

== Early life ==
Wandeler was born on 11 April 2006 in Fribourg, Switzerland. She began playing football in her hometown and later joined the youth academy of Olympique Lyonnais, moving to the club’s U19 squad in July 2023.

== Club career ==
During the 2023–24 season, Wandeler played primarily with Lyon's reserve team in Division 3 Féminine. On 5 May 2024, she made her professional debut for Lyon’s first team, coming on as a substitute in a league match against Guingamp. She earned her first start on 17 May 2024, in Lyon’s final league match of the season against Bordeaux, where she played the full 90 minutes.

Wandeler scored her first official goal for Lyon's senior team on 23 April 2025, during a 2–0 away victory against Nantes in the 21st round of the league season. She found the net in the 74th minute, doubling Lyon's lead after Sara Däbritz had opened the scoring in the first half.

On 23 August 2025, Wandeler joined West Ham United on a three-year contract.

== International career ==
Wandeler is a Switzerland youth international. She was part of the Switzerland U17 squad that participated in the UEFA Women's Under-17 Championship before progressing to the U19 level to feature in the UEFA Women's Under-19 Championship qualifiers.

In June 2024, Wandeler received her first call-up to the Switzerland national team. However, on 9 July, the Swiss Football Association announced that Wandeler had suffered a hip injury and was forced to withdraw from the squad. She officially left the national team camp the next day and was replaced by Naomi Luyet for the friendly matches against Turkey and Azerbaijan.

On 23 June 2025, Wandeler was called up to the Switzerland squad for the UEFA Women's Euro 2025.

== Career statistics ==
=== Club ===
As of match played 8 November 2026

Appearances and goals by club, season and competition
Club	Season	League			National cup (Note: Includes Women's FA Cup)		League cup (Note: Includes Women's League Cup)		Total	
Club	Season	Division	Apps	Goals	Apps	Goals	Apps	Goals	Apps	Goals
Lyon	2023–24	Première Ligue	2	0	0	0	—		2	0
Lyon	2024–25	Première Ligue	1	1	0	0	—		1	1
Lyon	Total		3	1	0	0	0	0	3	1
West Ham United	2025–26	Women's Super League	19	0	2	1	4	1	25	2
West Ham United	2026–27	Women's Super League	9	1	0	0	4	1	13	2
West Ham United	Total		28	1	2	0	8	3	38	4
Career total			31	2	2	1	8	2	41	5

=== International ===
As of match played 13 October 2026

Appearances and goals by national team and year
National team	Year	Apps	Goals
Switzerland	2025	7	0
Switzerland	2026	6	0
Total		13	0

== Honours ==
Lyon

- Première Ligue: 2023–24
