= Riko Ueki =

Japanese footballer (born 1999)

Riko Ueki 植木 理子
- Ueki in 2026

Personal information
- Date of birth: 30 July 1999 (age 27)
- Place of birth: Kawasaki, Kanagawa, Japan
- Height: 1.62 m (5 ft 4 in)
- Position: Forward

Team information
- Current team: West Ham United
- Number: 9

Youth career
- 2012–2015: Tokyo Verdy Beleza

Senior career*
Years	Team	Apps	(Gls)
2016–2023	Tokyo Verdy Beleza	98	(41)
2023–	West Ham United	66	(12)

International career^{‡}
2016	Japan U-17	5	(4)
2018	Japan U-20	6	(5)
2019–	Japan	54	(19)
Medal record
Women's football
Representing Japan
AFC Women's Asian Cup
Winner	2026 Australia
FIFA U-20 Women's World Cup
Winner	2018 France
AFC U-19 Women's Championship
Winner	2017 China
FIFA U-17 Women's World Cup
Runner-up	2016 Jordan
AFC U-16 Women's Championship
Runner-up	2015 China
- * Club domestic league appearances and goals as of 15:43, 15 September 2026 (UTC) ‡ National team caps and goals as of 06:04, 28 April 2026 (UTC)

Riko Ueki (植木 理子, Ueki Riko; IPA: [ɯ.eki ɾiko]; born 30 July 1999) is a Japanese professional footballer who plays as a striker for the Women's Super League club West Ham United and the Japan national team.

== Early life ==
Ueki was born in Kanagawa Prefecture on 30 July 1999. She started playing football in 2011 at the age of 12. From the day she first started football, Ueki has always played as a forward, never playing in any other position in her career so far. She had stated that her role model growing up was fellow Japanese forward Mana Iwabuchi She joined Tokyo Verdy Beleza youth team in 2012.

Ueki attended Waseda University, one of the most selective and prestigious universities in Japan, majoring in sports science. While at college she took courses in sports management and marketing. She graduated from the university in March 2022.

== Club career ==
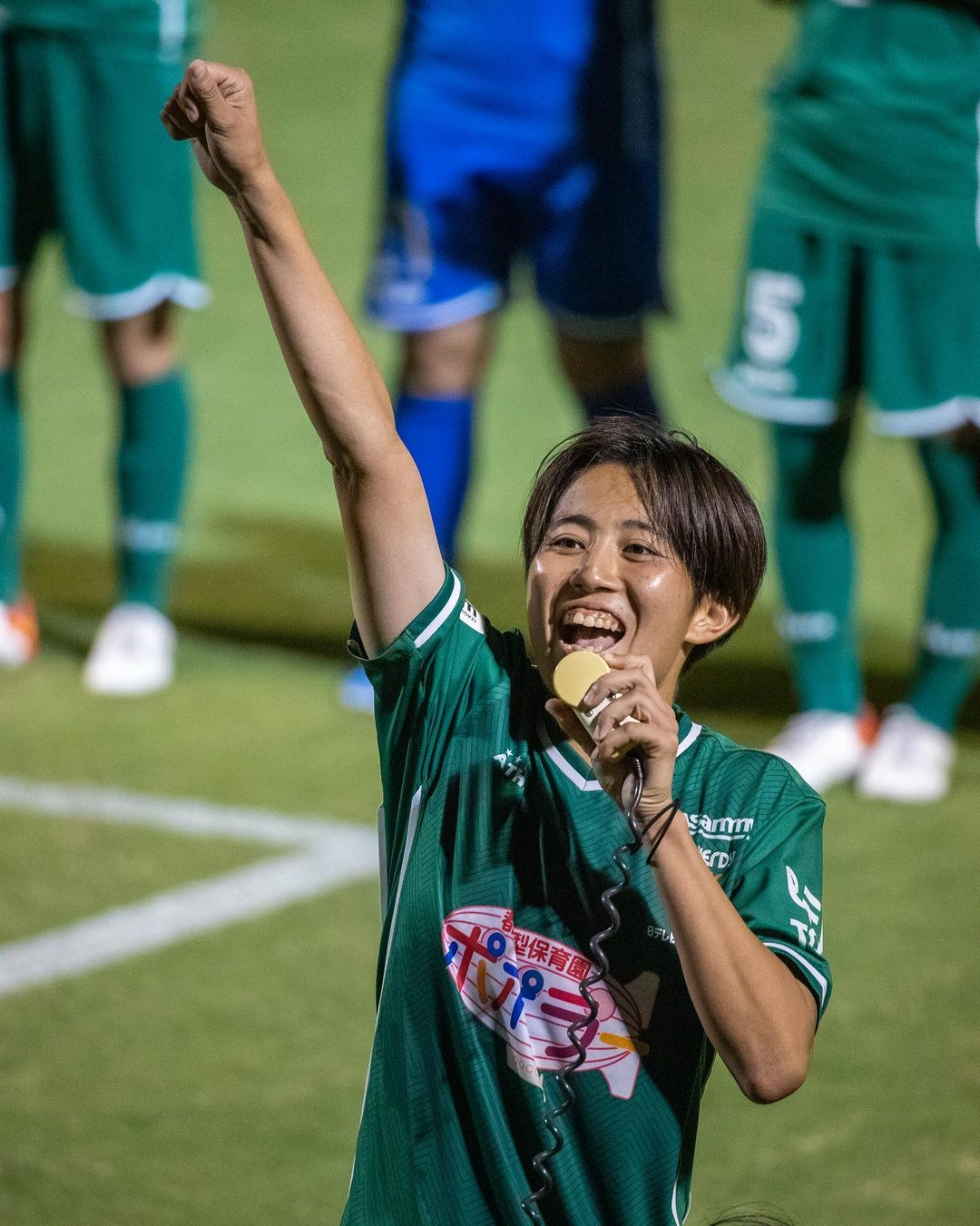
Ueki after a WE League match in September 2021

=== Tokyo Verdy Beleza ===
Ueki joined Nadeshiko League club Tokyo Verdy Beleza from the youth team in 2015, and was first called up to the senior team in June 2016. She marked her debut with a goal as a substitute in a League Cup match against Speranza Osaka. She was part of the squad which won four consecutive Nadeshiko League title from 2016 to 2019. In the inaugural 2021–22 WE League season, Ueki was chosen amongst the recipients of the Most Outstanding Players award. She had her breakout season the 2022–23 WE League season, as she finished as the league's top scorer with 14 goals and was named to the 2022–23 WE League Best Eleven. in In total, she has scored 81 goals in 152 appearances in all competitions for Tokyo Verdy Beleza.

=== West Ham United ===
On 12 September 2023, Ueki joined West Ham United ahead of the 2023–24 Women's Super League season. She made her debut in the opening league match defeat to Manchester City on 1 October 2023. She would score her first goal for the club in a 2–0 victory against Brighton & Hove Albion on 8 October 2023.

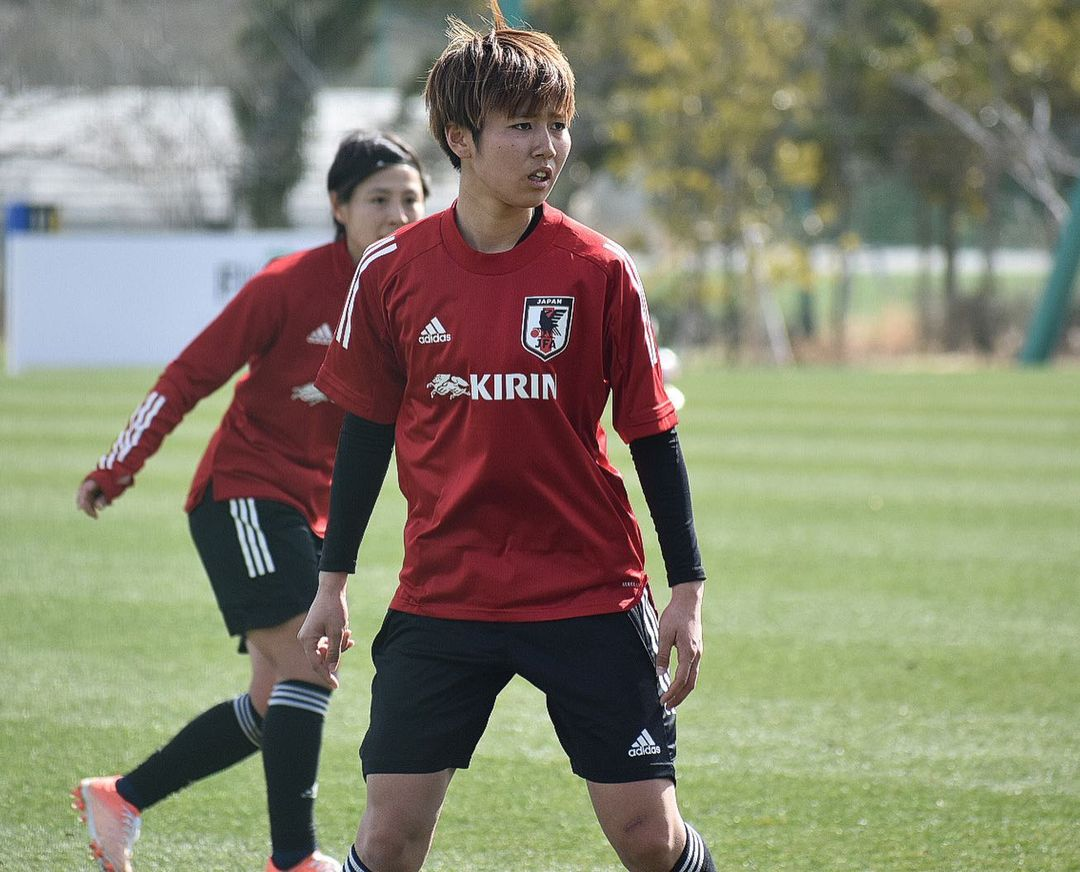
Ueki with the Japan national team during a training camp in 2020

On 9 September 2025, Ueki signed a one-year contract extension at West Ham tying her to the club until summer 2027.

== International career ==
=== Youth ===
In 2016, Ueki was selected to the Japan U-17 national team for the 2016 FIFA U-17 Women's World Cup. She played in 6 matches and scored 4 goals, and Japan finished as runners-up in the tournament. In 2018, Ueki was selected for the Japan U-20 national team for 2018 FIFA U-20 Women's World Cup. She played in all 6 matches and scored 5 goals, including a crucial goal in their semi-final victory over England and helped Japan win the title.

=== Senior ===
On 4 April 2019, Ueki debuted for the senior Japan national team against France. Later that year, Ueki was named to Japan's squad for the 2019 FIFA Women's World Cup; however, she was forced to withdraw due to injury on 31 May. Ueki experienced a breakout year with the national team in 2022, as she began to establish herself as a starting striker and finished the 2022 AFC Women's Asian Cup as Japan's top scorer with five goals, and joint second-highest goalscorer of the tournament as a whole.

On 13 June 2023, she was included in the 23-player squad for the FIFA Women's World Cup 2023. On July 31, 2023, Ueki scored in Japan's 2023 FIFA Women's World Cup Group C Round 3 match against Spain.

On 14 June 2024, Ueki was included in the Japan squad for the 2024 Summer Olympics. Ueki was part of the Japan squad that won the 2025 SheBelieves Cup.

Ueki won the 2026 AFC Women's Asian Cup with her national team after a 1–0 victory over Australia in the final, finishing as the tournament's top scorer with 6 goals.

== Personal life ==
One of Ueki's main hobbies is reading manga, also known as Japanese comics or graphic novels, and she revealed that she has a collection of over 1000 copies of such books at home. She was even invited to make a cameo appearance in a television drama adaptation of the manga series Shiyakusho that aired on TV Tokyo from October to December 2019.

== Career statistics ==
=== Club ===
As of match played 12 September 2026

Appearances and goals by club, season and competition
Club	Season	League			National cup (Note: Includes Empress's Cup, Women's FA Cup)		League cup (Note: Includes Nadeshiko League Cup, WE League Cup, FA Women's League Cup)		Continental (Note: Includes AFC Women's Club Championship)		Total	
Club	Season	Division	Apps	Goals	Apps	Goals	Apps	Goals	Apps	Goals	Apps	Goals
Tokyo Verdy Beleza	2016	Nadeshiko League	0	0	0	0	9	5	—		9	5
Tokyo Verdy Beleza	2017	Nadeshiko League	18	5	4	3	8	3	—		30	11
Tokyo Verdy Beleza	2018	Nadeshiko League	12	4	5	3	8	8	—		25	15
Tokyo Verdy Beleza	2019	Nadeshiko League	16	8	3	0	1	0	3	1	23	9
Tokyo Verdy Beleza	2020	Nadeshiko League	14	4	0	0	—		—		14	4
Tokyo Verdy Beleza	2021–22	WE League	19	6	2	1	—		—		21	7
Tokyo Verdy Beleza	2022–23	WE League	19	14	4	8	5	6	—		28	28
Tokyo Verdy Beleza	2023–24	WE League	0	0	0	0	2	2	—		2	2
Tokyo Verdy Beleza	Total		98	41	18	15	33	24	3	1	152	81
West Ham United	2023–24	Women's Super League	22	6	1	0	3	1	—		26	7
West Ham United	2024–25	Women's Super League	22	4	1	0	5	2	—		28	6
West Ham United	2025–26	Women's Super League	20	2	2	1	3	1	—		25	4
West Ham United	2026–27	Women's Super League	2	0	0	0	0	0	—		2	0
West Ham United	Total		66	12	4	1	11	4	0	0	81	17
Career total			164	53	22	16	44	28	3	1	233	98

=== International ===
As of match played 18 April 2026

Appearances and goals by national team and year
National Team	Year	Apps	Goals
Japan	2019	3	0
Japan	2020	2	0
Japan	2021	1	0
Japan	2022	11	8
Japan	2023	13	3
Japan	2024	10	1
Japan	2025	6	0
Japan	2026	8	7
Total		54	19

Scores and results list Japan's goal tally first, score column indicates score after each Ueki goal.

List of international goals scored by Riko Ueki
No.	Date	Venue	Opponent	Score	Result	Competition
1	21 January 2022	Shree Shiv Chhatrapati Sports Complex, Pune, India	Myanmar	1–0	5–0	2022 AFC Women's Asian Cup
2	27 January 2022	Shree Shiv Chhatrapati Sports Complex, Pune, India	South Korea	1–0	1–1	2022 AFC Women's Asian Cup
3	30 January 2022	DY Patil Stadium, Navi Mumbai, India	Thailand	5–0	7–0	2022 AFC Women's Asian Cup
4	3 February 2022	Shree Shiv Chhatrapati Sports Complex, Pune, India	China	1–0	2–2 (a.e.t.) (3–4 p)	2022 AFC Women's Asian Cup
5	3 February 2022	Shree Shiv Chhatrapati Sports Complex, Pune, India	China	2–1	2–2 (a.e.t.) (3–4 p)	2022 AFC Women's Asian Cup
6	24 June 2022	Sport Center FAS, Stara Pazova, Serbia	Serbia	1–0	5–0	Friendly
7	27 June 2022	Veritas Stadion, Turku, Finland	Finland	4–1	5–1	Friendly
8	9 October 2022	Nagano U Stadium, Nagano, Japan	New Zealand	2–0	2–0	Friendly
9	22 July 2023	Waikato Stadium, Hamilton, New Zealand	Zambia	5–0	5–0	2023 FIFA Women's World Cup
10	31 July 2023	Wellington Regional Stadium, Wellington, New Zealand	Spain	2–0	4–0	2023 FIFA Women's World Cup
11	23 September 2023	Kitakyushu Stadium, Kitakyushu, Japan	Argentina	7–0	8–0	Friendly
12	13 July 2024	Kanazawa Stadium, Kanazawa, Ishikawa, Japan	Ghana	4–0	4–0	MS&AD Cup
13	7 March 2026	Perth Rectangular Stadium, Perth, Australia	India	6–0	11–0	2026 AFC Women's Asian Cup
14	7 March 2026	Perth Rectangular Stadium, Perth, Australia	India	7–0	11–0	2026 AFC Women's Asian Cup
15	7 March 2026	Perth Rectangular Stadium, Perth, Australia	India	10–0	11–0	2026 AFC Women's Asian Cup
16	10 March 2026	Perth Rectangular Stadium, Perth, Australia	Vietnam	1–0	4–0	2026 AFC Women's Asian Cup
17	15 March 2026	Stadium Australia, Sydney, Australia	Philippines	7–0	7–0	2026 AFC Women's Asian Cup
18	18 March 2026	Stadium Australia, Sydney, Australia	South Korea	1–0	4–1	2026 AFC Women's Asian Cup
19	11 April 2026	PayPal Park, San Jose, California, United States	United States	1–2	1–2	Friendly

== Honours ==
Tokyo Verdy Beleza

- Nadeshiko League: 2016, 2017, 2018, 2019
- Nadeshiko League Cup: 2017, 2018, 2019, 2020
- WE League Cup runner-up: 2022–23
- Empress's Cup: 2014, 2017, 2018, 2019, 2020, 2022
- AFC Women's Club Championship: 2019

Japan U19

- AFC U-19 Women's Championship: 2015

Japan U20

- FIFA U-20 Women's World Cup: 2018
- AFC U-19 Women's Championship: 2017

Japan

- AFC Asian Cup: 2026
- EAFF Women's Football Championship: 2019, 2022

Individual

- WE League Best XI: 2022–23
- WE League Golden Boot: 2022–23
- WE League Outstanding Players Award: 2021–22, 2022–23
- West Ham United Young Player of the Year: 2023–24
- AFC Women's Asian Cup Golden Boot: 2026
