= Estelle Cascarino =

French footballer (born 1997)

- Cascarino in 2026

Personal information
- Full name: Estelle Cascarino
- Date of birth: 5 February 1997 (age 29)
- Place of birth: Saint-Priest, France
- Height: 1.65 m (5 ft 5 in)
- Position: Defender

Team information
- Current team: West Ham United
- Number: 28

Youth career
- 2006–2007: AS Saint-Priest
- 2007–2009: AS Manissieux Saint-Priest
- 2009–2016: Lyon

Senior career*
Years	Team	Apps	(Gls)
2015–2016	Lyon	2	(0)
2016–2019	Paris FC (Note: Known as FCF Juvisy during the 2016–17 season.)	54	(0)
2019–2021	Bordeaux	26	(0)
2021–2023	Paris Saint-Germain	17	(0)
2023	→ Manchester United (loan)	1	(0)
2023–2026	Juventus	37	(0)
2026	→ West Ham United (loan)	10	(0)
2026–	West Ham United	2	(0)

International career^{‡}
2012	France U16	3	(0)
2012–2013	France U17	15	(0)
2015–2016	France U19	15	(0)
2016	France U20	8	(0)
2017–2019	France U23	9	(0)
2017–	France	19	(1)
Medal record
Women's football
Representing France
UEFA Women's Nations League
Runner-up	2024
- * Club domestic league appearances and goals as of 15:38, 15 September 2026 (UTC) ‡ National team caps and goals as of 10 October 2026

Estelle Cascarino (born 5 February 1997) is a French professional footballer who plays as a defender for Women's Super League club West Ham United and the France national team.

== Club career ==
Cascarino started playing football at the age of thirteen for the youth teams of Olympique Lyon. She made her debut in the Division 1 Féminine in Olympique Lyonnais' 2014–15 season. While at Olympique Lyonnais, she won two Division 1 titles. Cascarino signed her first professional contract in 2015. In June 2016, Cascarino left Olympique Lyonnais as she felt that she would not have been selected due to a lack of first team opportunities. She moved to FCF Juvisy (later renamed as Paris FC) on a two-year contract.

On 9 July 2021, Paris Saint-Germain announced the signing of Cascarino on a three-year deal.

On 21 January 2023, Cascarino joined English Women's Super League club Manchester United on loan until the end of the season. She made her debut for the club on 29 January, entering as a 68th-minute substitute in a 2–1 win away to Championship side Sunderland in the fourth round of the 2022–23 Women's FA Cup.

On 18 August 2023, Cascarino joined Juventus on a two-year contract until 30 June 2025.

On 8 January 2026, Cascarino was announced at West Ham on loan until the end of the season.

Cascarino returned to Juventus at the end of her loan, but was announced as a permanent West Ham signing on 17 July 2026, signing a three year deal with the club.

== International career ==
Cascarino was called up to play for the France women's under-16 national football team in 2012. From there, she moved up the individual French national age grades between 2012 and 2016. In 2016, she played in both the 2016 UEFA Women's Under-19 Championship and the 2016 FIFA U-20 Women's World Cup at the respective age groups. In 2017, Cascarino made her debut for the France women's national football team in a friendly against Ghana.

Cascarino was called up to the France squad for the 2023 FIFA Women's World Cup.

In July 2024, Cascarino was named in France's squad for the 2024 Olympics.

== Personal life ==
Cascarino is the twin sister of Delphine Cascarino who also plays football professionally as a midfielder. Her father is Italian and her mother is from Guadeloupe. They are not related to former Republic of Ireland player Tony Cascarino, although they are often asked if they are.

== Career statistics ==
=== Club ===
As of match played 12 September 2026

Appearances and goals by club, season and competition
Club	Season	League			National cup (Note: includes the Coupe de France, FA Cup, Coppa Italia)		League cup (Note: includes the Serie A Women's Cup, Women's League Cup)		Continental (Note: includes the UEFA Champions League)		Other		Total	
Club	Season	Division	Apps	Goals	Apps	Goals	Apps	Goals	Apps	Goals	Apps	Goals	Apps	Goals
Lyon	2014–15	D1 Féminine	1	0	0	0	—		0	0	—		1	0
Lyon	2015–16	D1 Féminine	1	0	1	0	—		0	0	—		2	0
Lyon	Total		2	0	1	0	0	0	0	0	0	0	3	0
Paris FC	2016–17	D1 Féminine	15	0	1	1	—		—		—		16	1
Paris FC	2017–18	D1 Féminine	20	0	2	0	—		—		—		22	0
Paris FC	2018–19	D1 Féminine	19	0	4	0	—		—		—		23	0
Paris FC	Total		54	0	7	1	0	0	0	0	0	0	61	1
Bordeaux	2019–20	D1 Féminine	12	0	4	0	—		—		—		16	0
Bordeaux	2020–21	D1 Féminine	14	0	1	0	—		—		—		15	0
Bordeaux	Total		26	0	5	0	0	0	0	0	0	0	31	0
Paris Saint-Germain	2021–22	D1 Féminine	12	0	1	0	—		3	0	—		16	0
Paris Saint-Germain	2022–23	D1 Féminine	5	0	0	0	—		5	0	1 (Note: appearance(s) in Trophée des Championnes)	0	11	0
Paris Saint-Germain	Total		17	0	1	0	0	0	8	0	1	0	27	0
Manchester United (loan)	2022–23	Women's Super League	1	0	1	0	0	0	—		—		2	0
Juventus	2023–24	Serie A	23	0	1	0	—		2	0	1 (Note: appearance(s) in Supercoppa Italiana)	0	27	0
Juventus	2024–25	Serie A	9	0	0	0	—		6	0	—		15	0
Juventus	2025–26	Serie A	5	0	1	0	2	0	0	0	—		7	0
Juventus	Total		37	0	2	0	2	0	8	0	1	0	49	0
West Ham United (loan)	2025–26	Women's Super League	10	0	2	1	0	0	—		—		12	1
West Ham United	2026–27	Women's Super League	2	0	0	0	0	0	—		—		2	0
Career total			149	0	19	1	2	0	16	0	2	0	188	2

=== International ===
As of match played 10 October 2026

Appearances and goals by national team and year
National team	Year	Apps	Goals
France	2017	1	0
France	2020	4	1
France	2021	0	0
France	2023	10	0
France	2024	3	0
France	2026	1	0
Total		19	1

Scores and results list France's goal tally first, score column indicates score after each Cascarino goal.

List of international goals scored by Estelle Cascarino
No.	Date	Cap	Venue	Opponent	Score	Result	Competition
1	1 December 2020	5	Stade de la Rabine, Vannes, France	Kazakhstan	8–0	12–0	2022 UEFA Women's Euro qualification

== Honours ==
Paris Saint-Germain

- Coupe de France féminine: 2021–22

Manchester United

- Women's FA Cup runner-up: 2022–23
