= Ylinn Tennebø =

Norwegian footballer (born 2000)

- Tennebø in 2026

Personal information
- Date of birth: 10 January 2000 (age 26)
- Place of birth: China
- Position: Midfielder

Team information
- Current team: West Ham United
- Number: 15

Senior career*
Years	Team	Apps	(Gls)
2015–2016	Tornado Måløy	6	(0)
2016–2019	Kaupanger	63	(11)
2019–2020	Avaldsnes	28	(3)
2021–2026	Vålerenga	89	(12)
2026–	West Ham United	7	(0)

International career
2016	Norway U16	2	(1)
2017	Norway U17	10	(1)
2023–2024	Norway U23	3	(0)
- * Club domestic league appearances and goals as of 15:36, 15 September 2026 (UTC)

Ylinn Tennebø (born 10 January 2000) is a Norwegian professional footballer who plays for Women's Super League club West Ham United.

== Early life ==
Born in China, Tennebø was adopted by parents in Måløy, Norway at the age of only 9 months.

== Club career ==
After playing for Kaupanger IL, she joined Toppserien side Avaldsnes in 2019. She made her league debut for Avaldsnes in August 2019, in a 2–1 win against Arna-Bjørnar.

In December 2020, she signed for Toppserien titleholders Vålerenga. With Vålerenga, she won the Norwegian Women's Cup in 2021, and the Toppserien title in 2023.

On 2 October 2024, Tennebø extended her contract with Vålerenga until the end of 2026.

On 30 January 2026, it was announced that Tennebø had signed for Women's Super League side West Ham United on a two-and-half-year contract.

== International career ==
Tennebø has international matches for U16, U17, and the U23 national teams of Norway.

== Career statistics ==
=== Club ===
As of match played 12 September 2026

Appearances and goals by club, season and competition
Club	Season	League			National cup (Note: Includes Norwegian Women's Cup, Women's FA Cup)		League cup (Note: Includes Women's League Cup)		Continental		Total	
Club	Season	Division	Apps	Goals	Apps	Goals	Apps	Goals	Apps	Goals	Apps	Goals
Tornado Måløy	2015	3. divisjon Kvinner	2	0	0	0	—		—		2	0
Tornado Måløy	2016	3. divisjon Kvinner	4	0	0	0	—		—		4	0
Tornado Måløy	Total		6	0	0	0	0	0	0	0	6	0
Kaupanger	2016	2. divisjon Kvinner	11	4	0	0	—		—		11	4
Kaupanger	2017	2. divisjon Kvinner	21	2	1	0	—		—		22	2
Kaupanger	2018	1. divisjon Kvinner	19	3	1	0	—		—		20	3
Kaupanger	2019	1. divisjon Kvinner	12	2	1	0	—		—		13	2
Kaupanger	Total		63	11	3	0	0	0	0	0	66	11
Avaldsnes	2019	Toppserien	10	1	2	0	—		—		12	1
Avaldsnes	2020	Toppserien	18	2	3	0	—		—		21	2
Avaldsnes	Total		28	3	5	0	0	0	0	0	33	3
Vålerenga	2021	Toppserien	14	0	2	0	—		—		16	0
Vålerenga	2022	Toppserien	17	1	2	0	—		—		19	1
Vålerenga	2023	Toppserien	26	6	5	1	—		4 (Note: appearance(s) in UEFA Women's Champions League)	1	35	8
Vålerenga	2024	Toppserien	21	5	5	0	—		6	0	32	5
Vålerenga	2025	Toppserien	11	0	2	0	—		9	0	22	0
Vålerenga	Total		89	12	16	1	0	0	19	1	124	14
West Ham United	2025–26	Women's Super League	6	0	1	0	0	0	—		7	0
West Ham United	2026–27	Women's Super League	1	0	0	0	0	0	—		1	0
West Ham United	Total		7	0	0	0	0	0	0	0	8	0
Career total			193	26	24	1	0	0	19	1	236	28
