= 2024–25 West Ham United F.C. Women season =

West Ham United
2024–25 season
- Head Coach: Rehanne Skinner
- Stadium: Victoria Road, Dagenham
- WSL: 9th
- FA Cup: Fourth round
- League Cup: Semi-final
- Top goalscorer: League: Shekiera Martinez (10); All: Viviane Asseyi (13)
- Highest home attendance: 3,300 (vs. Arsenal, 20 October)
- Lowest home attendance: 1,219 (vs. Everton, 26 January)
- Average home league attendance: 1,859
- Biggest win: 7–1 v Crystal Palace (A) (WSL, 27 April 2025)
- Biggest defeat: 0–5 v Chelsea (H) (WSL, 19 January 2025); 0–5 v Liverpool (H) (FA Cup, 29 January 2025)
Home colours	Away colours	Third colours

The 2024–25 West Ham United F.C. Women season was the club's 34th season in existence and their seventh in the Women's Super League, the highest level of the football pyramid. Along with competing in the WSL, the club also contested two domestic cup competitions: the FA Cup and the League Cup.

== Squad ==
As of 22 February 2025

Note: Flags indicate national team as defined under FIFA eligibility rules; some limited exceptions apply. Players may hold more than one non-FIFA nationality.

No.	Pos.	Nation	Player
1	GK	POL	Kinga Szemik
2	DF	SCO	Kirsty Smith
4	MF	FIN	Oona Siren
5	DF	BEL	Amber Tysiak
7	MF	SWE	Marika Bergman-Lundin
9	FW	JPN	Riko Ueki
10	MF	ISL	Dagný Brynjarsdóttir
11	FW	COL	Manuela Paví
12	FW	ENG	Emma Harries
13	DF	FIN	Eva Nyström
14	DF	CAN	Shelina Zadorsky (vice-captain)
15	MF	USA	Kristie Mewis
16	MF	IRL	Jessica Ziu
17	DF	CHI	Camila Sáez

No.	Pos.	Nation	Player
18	DF	ENG	Anouk Denton
19	FW	GER	Shekiera Martinez
20	FW	FRA	Viviane Asseyi
22	MF	AUS	Katrina Gorry (captain)
25	GK	IRL	Megan Walsh
26	DF	CHN	Li Mengwen (on loan from Brighton & Hove Albion)
29	DF	AUT	Verena Hanshaw
34	MF	ENG	Macey Nicholls
35	FW	ENG	Princess Ademiluyi
36	MF	ENG	Soraya Walsh
42	DF	ENG	Marnie Morrison
43	DF	ENG	Daniella Way
44	FW	ENG	Ruby Doe
77	MF	SUI	Seraina Piubel

== Preseason ==
Westh Ham United participated in the inaugural Perth International Football Cup invitational friendly as part of preseason.

29 August 2024 Perth Cup	West Ham United	0–1	(France) Paris Saint-Germain	Perth, Australia
		Report	Leuchter 23'	Stadium: Perth Rectangular

1 September 2024 Perth Cup	Leicester City	5–2	West Ham United	Perth, Australia
	Momiki 10'; Tierney 33'; Goodwin 42'; Mouchon 50'; Takarada 76'	Report	Asseyi 90', 90+6'	Stadium: Perth Stadium

== Women's Super League ==
=== Results summary ===
Overall								Home						Away					
Pld	W	D	L	GF	GA	GD	Pts	W	D	L	GF	GA	GD	W	D	L	GF	GA	GD
22	6	5	11	36	41	−5	23	5	3	3	17	15	+2	1	2	8	19	26	−7

Last updated: 10 May 2025.
Source: WSL

=== Results by matchday ===
Round	1	2	3	4	5	6	7	8	9	10	11	12	13	14	15	16	17	18	19	20	21	22
Ground	A	H	A	A	H	A	H	A	H	A	H	H	A	H	A	H	H	A	H	A	H	A
Result	L	D	L	D	L	L	W	L	W	L	L	W	L	W	L	D	W	D	D	W	L	L
Position	10	10	11	11	12	11	9	11	8	10	10	8	9	8	9	9	8	7	7	7	7	9

A = Away; H = Home; W = Win; D = Draw; L = Loss

=== Results ===
21 September 2024 1	Manchester United	3–0	West Ham United	Trafford
12:00	Geyse 28'; Galton 45+3'; Clinton 53'	Report	Harries (yellow card) 26'	Stadium: Old Trafford; Attendance: 8,761; Referee: Cheryl Foster

29 September 2024 2	West Ham United	1–1	Liverpool	Dagenham
15:00	Gorry (yellow card) 27'; Brynjarsdóttir (yellow card) 56'; Ueki 85'	Report	Smith 7'; Hinds (yellow card) 19'; Laws (yellow card) 84'	Stadium: Victoria Road; Attendance: 1,799; Referee: Abigail Byrne

6 October 2024 3	Manchester City	2–0	West Ham United	Manchester
13:00	Hemp 10'; Fowler 71'; Kennedy (yellow card) 90'	Report	Cooke (yellow card) 90+2'	Stadium: Academy Stadium; Attendance: 3,316; Referee: Elizabeth Simms

13 October 2024 4	Everton	1–1	West Ham United	Walton
14:00	S. Holmgaard (yellow card) 60'; Sáez 72' (o.g.)	Report	Denton 10'; Asseyi (yellow card) 76'; Gorry (yellow card) 80'; Cooke (yellow card) 90+2'	Stadium: Walton Hall Park; Attendance: 1,087; Referee: Richie Watkins

20 October 2024 5	West Ham United	0–2	Arsenal	Dagenham
15:00	Asseyi (yellow card) 40'	Report	Caldentey 71' (pen.), (yellow card) 82'; Kafaji 89'	Stadium: Victoria Road; Attendance: 3,300; Referee: Thomas Parsons

3 November 2024 6	Tottenham Hotspur	2–1	West Ham United	Leyton
14:00	Neville (yellow card) 38'; Summanen (yellow card) 41'; England 51'; Hunt (yellow card) 73'; Sáez 90+2' (o.g.)	Report	Ueki 37', (yellow card) 40'; Asseyi (yellow card) 84'	Stadium: Brisbane Road; Attendance: 1,614; Referee: Melissa Burgin

10 November 2024 7	West Ham United	1–0	Leicester City	Dagenham
15:00	Asseyi 45+7'; Paví (yellow card) 80'	Report	Mace (yellow card) 40'; Ale (yellow card) 70'; Rose (yellow card) 84'	Stadium: Victoria Road; Attendance: 1,617; Referee: Elizabeth Simms

16 November 2024 8	Brighton & Hove Albion	3–2	West Ham United	Crawley
12:30	McLauchlan 29'; Seike 60'; Čanković (yellow card) 76'; Kirby 82'	Report	Asseyi (yellow card) 24'; Zadorsky (yellow card) 56'; Gorry 64', 69'	Stadium: Broadfield Stadium; Attendance: 4,638; Referee: Lisa Benn

8 December 2024 9	West Ham United	5–2	Crystal Palace	Dagenham
14:30	Asseyi 17'; Piubel 36'; Paví 44'; Denton 82'; Gorry 90+2'	Report	Gejl 5'; Riley 11', (yellow card) 55'; Stengel (yellow card) 31'; Potter (yellow card) 85'	Stadium: Victoria Road; Attendance: 1,292; Referee: Lisa Benn

15 December 2024 10	Aston Villa	3–1	West Ham United	Aston
14:00	Leon 4', 43'; Maritz (yellow card) 20'; Nobbs (yellow card) 53'; Dali 83'	Report	Asseyi 21'; Li (yellow card) 77'	Stadium: Villa Park; Attendance: 2,494; Referee: Grace Lowe

19 January 2025 11	West Ham United	0–5	Chelsea	Dagenham
15:00	Gorry (yellow card) 87'	Report	Macario 11'; Cuthbert 21'; Beever-Jones 44'; Baltimore 52'; Tysiak 85' (o.g.)	Stadium: Victoria Road; Attendance: 2,461; Referee: Amy Fearn

26 January 2025 12	West Ham United	2–0	Everton	Dagenham
15:00	Martinez 9', (yellow card) 61'; Asseyi 45' (pen.); Tysiak (yellow card) 84'	Report	Payne (yellow card) 69'	Stadium: Victoria Road; Attendance: 1,219; Referee: Adewunmi Soneye

2 February 2025 13	Liverpool	1–0	West Ham United	St Helens
14:00	Fisk (yellow card) 18'; Kiernan 33'; Smith (yellow card) 71'	Report	Siren (yellow card) 39'	Stadium: Totally Wicked Stadium; Attendance: 3,166; Referee: Amy Fearn

16 February 2025 14	West Ham United	3–1	Brighton & Hove Albion	Dagenham
15:00	Martinez 11'; Hanshaw (yellow card) 45+1'; Ueki 64'; Asseyi 68' (pen.)	Report	Parris 14'; Losada (yellow card) 29'; McLauchlan (yellow card) 60'	Stadium: Victoria Road; Attendance: 1,460; Referee: Stacey Pearson

2 March 2025 15	Arsenal	4–3	West Ham United	Borehamwood
17:30	Kelly 44', (yellow card) 52'; McCabe 56'; Williamson 58'; Caldentey 62' (pen.)	Report	Tysiak 7', 12'; Martinez 51'; Asseyi (yellow card) 67'	Stadium: Meadow Park; Attendance: 3,621; Referee: Ade Soneye

5 March 2025 16	West Ham United	1–1	Manchester City	Dagenham
19:00	Paví 90+1'	Report	Shaw 80'	Stadium: Victoria Road; Attendance: 1,267; Referee: Grace Lowe
Note: This match, originally scheduled for 16 March, was rescheduled due to Manchester City's participation in the 2025 Women's League Cup final.

23 March 2025 17	West Ham United	2–0	Tottenham Hotspur	Dagenham
12:00	Rybrink 16' (o.g.); Paví (yellow card) 26'; Asseyi 90'	Report	Spence (yellow card) 66'	Stadium: Victoria Road; Attendance: 1,859; Referee: Stacey Pearson

30 March 2025 18	Chelsea	2–2	West Ham United	Kingston upon Thames
16:30	Hamano 16'; Beever-Jones 21'; Lawrence (yellow card) 78'	Report	Martinez 42', 90+1'; Tysiak (yellow card) 60'	Stadium: Kingsmeadow; Attendance: 3,608; Referee: Abigail Byrne

19 April 2025 19	West Ham United	0–0	Manchester United	Dagenham
12:00	Li (yellow card) 33'	Report	Turner (yellow card) 39'; George (yellow card) 62'	Stadium: Victoria Road; Attendance: 2,315; Referee: Harrison Blair

27 April 2025 20	Crystal Palace	1–7	West Ham United	Sutton
12:30	Nouwen (yellow card) 57'; Stengel 80' (pen.)	Report	Denton (yellow card) 9'; Martinez 18', 42', 45', 62'; Asseyi 70'; Harries 86', 90+4'; Brynjarsdóttir (yellow card) 90+1'	Stadium: Gander Green Lane; Referee: Kirsty Dowle

4 May 2025 21	West Ham United	2–3	Aston Villa	Dagenham
15:00	Martinez 18', (yellow card) 44'; Ueki 34'; Gorry (yellow card) 50'; Zadorsky (yellow card) 59'	Report	Salmon 5'; Taylor (yellow card) 37'; Daly 37'; Parker (yellow card) 39'; Grant 54', (yellow card) 90'	Stadium: Victoria Road; Referee: Stacey Pearson

10 May 2025 22	Leicester City	4–2	West Ham United	Leicester
12:30	Cayman 9'; Cain 35', 59'; Tierney 69'	Report	Asseyi (yellow card) 44', (goal) 57', 63'	Stadium: King Power Stadium

=== League table ===
Pos	Team	Pld	W	D	L	GF	GA	GD	Pts
7	Liverpool	22	7	4	11	22	37	−15	25
8	Everton	22	6	6	10	24	32	−8	24
9	West Ham United	22	6	5	11	36	41	−5	23
10	Leicester City	22	5	5	12	21	37	−16	20
11	Tottenham Hotspur	22	5	5	12	26	44	−18	20

Source: The Football Association
Rules for classification: 1) Points; 2) Goal difference; 3) Number of goals scored.

== Women's FA Cup ==
As a member of the first tier, West Ham entered the FA Cup in the fourth round proper.

29 January 2025 Fourth round	West Ham United	0–5	Liverpool	Dagenham
19:45	Tysiak (red card)	Report	Sáez 3' (o.g.); Kiernan 18'; Fisk 48'; Parry 66'; Kerr 70'	Stadium: Victoria Road; Attendance: 859; Referee: Kirsty Dowle
Note: Rescheduled from 12 January due to frozen pitch.

== Women's League Cup ==
=== Group stage ===
2 October 2024 Group stage	West Ham United	6–1	Portsmouth	Dagenham
19:00	Piubel 13'; Houssein (yellow card) 23'; Harries 43', 52'; Asseyi 46', 49'; Ueki 90+3'	Report	Hornby 25' (pen.); Coan (yellow card) 30'	Stadium: Victoria Road; Attendance: 256; Referee: Kirsty Dowle

24 November 2024 Group stage	London City Lionesses	1–4	West Ham United	Bromley
14:00	Jakobsson 45+1'	Report	Asseyi 14', 72'; Paví 71'; Ueki 90+4'	Stadium: Hayes Lane; Attendance: 931; Referee: Jade Wardle

11 December 2024 Group stage	West Ham United	3–0	Southampton	Dagenham
19:00	Li (yellow card) 30'; Zadorsky 60'; Peake 76' (o.g.); Brynjarsdóttir 90+3'	Report		Stadium: Victoria Road; Attendance: 468; Referee: Amy Fearns

Pos	Team	Pld	W	WPEN	LPEN	L	GF	GA	GD	Pts	Qualification	WHU	LCL	SOU	POR
1	West Ham United	3	3	0	0	0	13	2	+11	9	Advanced to knock-out stage	—	–	3–0	6–1
2	London City Lionesses	3	2	0	0	1	7	6	+1	6		1–4	—	–	–
3	Southampton	3	1	0	0	2	4	4	0	3		–	0–1	—	–
4	Portsmouth	3	0	0	0	3	3	15	−12	0		–	2–5	0–4	—

Updated to match(es) played on 24 November 2024. Source: Women's League Cup
Rules for classification: 1) Points; 2) Goal difference; 3) Number of goals scored; 4) Number of wins; 5) Head-to-head record

=== Knockout stage ===
22 January 2025 Quarter-final	Tottenham Hotspur	1–2	West Ham United	Leyton
19:30	Thomas 10'	Report	Piubel 39'; Smith 44'; Asseyi (yellow card) 72'	Stadium: Brisbane Road; Attendance: 992; Referee: Ryan Atkin

5 February 2025 Semi-final	Chelsea	2–0	West Ham United	Kingston upon Thames
19:00	Kaneryd 20'; Lawrence (yellow card) 27'; Nüsken 29'; James (yellow card) 82'	Report	Ueki (yellow card) 75'	Stadium: Kingsmeadow; Attendance: Stacey Pearson

== Squad statistics ==
=== Appearances ===
As of match played 10 May 2025

Starting appearances are listed first, followed by substitute appearances after the + symbol where applicable.

No.	Pos	Nat	Player	Total		WSL		FA Cup		League Cup	
No.	Pos	Nat	Player	Apps	Goals	Apps	Goals	Apps	Goals	Apps	Goals
1	GK	(Poland) POL	Kinga Szemik	23	0	22	0	0	0	1	0
2	DF	(Scotland) SCO	Kirsty Smith	19	1	5+9	0	0+1	0	4	1
4	MF	(Finland) FIN	Oona Siren	26	0	18+2	0	1	0	3+2	0
5	DF	(Belgium) BEL	Amber Tysiak	22	2	19+1	2	1	0	0+1	0
7	MF	(Sweden) SWE	Marika Bergman-Lundin	6	0	0+2	0	0	0	4	0
9	FW	(Japan) JPN	Riko Ueki	28	6	21+1	4	1	0	1+4	2
10	MF	(Iceland) ISL	Dagný Brynjarsdóttir	22	1	4+14	0	0+1	0	2+1	1
11	FW	(Colombia) COL	Manuela Paví	26	3	8+12	2	1	0	3+2	1
12	FW	(England) ENG	Emma Harries	17	4	4+8	2	0+1	0	3+1	2
13	DF	(Finland) FIN	Eva Nyström	8	0	6+1	0	0	0	1	0
14	DF	(Canada) CAN	Shelina Zadorsky	26	1	19+2	0	0+1	0	3+1	1
15	MF	(United States) USA	Kristie Mewis	1	0	0+1	0	0	0	0	0
16	MF	(Republic of Ireland) IRL	Jessica Ziu	0	0	0	0	0	0	0	0
17	DF	(Chile) CHI	Camila Sáez	14	0	6+2	0	1	0	3+2	0
18	DF	(England) ENG	Anouk Denton	23	2	19+1	2	1	0	0+2	0
19	FW	(Germany) GER	Shekiera Martinez	15	10	11+1	10	1	0	2	0
20	FW	(France) FRA	Viviane Asseyi	26	13	21	9	1	0	2+2	4
22	MF	(Australia) AUS	Katrina Gorry	25	3	21+1	3	1	0	1+1	0
25	GK	(Republic of Ireland) IRL	Megan Walsh	5	0	0	0	1	0	4	0
26	DF	(China) CHN	Li Mengwen	16	0	10	0	1	0	4+1	0
29	DF	(Austria) AUT	Verena Hanshaw	12	0	11	0	0	0	1	0
34	MF	(England) ENG	Macey Nicholls	0	0	0	0	0	0	0	0
35	FW	(England) ENG	Princess Ademiluyi	6	0	0+6	0	0	0	0	0
36	MF	(England) ENG	Soraya Walsh	1	0	0	0	0	0	1	0
42	DF	(England) ENG	Marnie Morrison	1	0	0	0	0	0	1	0
43	DF	(England) ENG	Daniella Way	2	0	0	0	0	0	0+2	0
44	FW	(England) ENG	Ruby Doe	1	0	0	0	0	0	1	0
77	MF	(Switzerland) SUI	Seraina Piubel	28	3	14+8	1	0+1	0	4+1	2
Players away from the club on loan:
21	DF	(England) ENG	Shannon Cooke	12	0	3+5	0	0	0	4	0
33	MF	(Turkey) TUR	Halle Houssein	2	0	0	0	0	0	2	0

== Transfers ==
=== Transfers in ===
Date	Position	Nationality	Name	From	Ref.
1 July 2024	FW	(Germany)	Shekiera Martinez	(Germany) Eintracht Frankfurt	
1 July 2024	GK	(Poland)	Kinga Szemik	(France) Reims	
12 July 2024	DF	(Chile)	Camila Sáez	(Spain) Madrid CFF	
25 July 2024	DF	(Algeria)	Inès Belloumou	(Germany) Bayern Munich	
19 August 2024	DF	(Canada)	Shelina Zadorsky	(England) Tottenham Hotspur	
26 August 2024	FW	(Colombia)	Manuela Paví	(Colombia) Deportivo Cali	
9 September 2024	MF	(Switzerland)	Seraina Piubel	(Switzerland) Zürich	
12 September 2024	MF	(Finland)	Oona Siren	(Norway) LSK Kvinner	
21 January 2025	DF	(Austria)	Verena Hanshaw	(Italy) Roma	
25 January 2025	DF	(Finland)	Eva Nyström	(Sweden) Hammarby	

=== Loans in ===
Date	Position	Nationality	Name	From	Until	Ref.
13 September 2024	DF	(China)	Li Mengwen	(England) Brighton & Hove Albion	End of season	

=== Transfers out ===
Date	Position	Nationality	Name	To	Ref.
30 June 2024	GK	(Australia)	Mackenzie Arnold	(United States) Portland Thorns	
30 June 2024	DF	(France)	Hawa Cissoko	(Italy) Roma	
30 June 2024	DF	(England)	Keira Ferns	(United States) McKendree Bearcats	
30 June 2024	MF	(England)	Mel Filis	(England) Charlton Athletic	
30 June 2024	MF	(Japan)	Honoka Hayashi	(England) Everton	
30 June 2024	DF	(Japan)	Risa Shimizu	(England) Manchester City	
30 June 2024	MF	(Denmark)	Emma Snerle	(Italy) Fiorentina	
30 June 2024	MF	(England)	Abbey-Leigh Stringer	(United States) DC Power	
8 August 2024	GK	(England)	Katie O'Hanlon	(England) Billericay Town	

=== Loans out ===
Date	Position	Nationality	Name	To	Until	Ref.
1 July 2024	FW	(Germany)	Shekiera Martinez	(Germany) SC Freiburg	3 January 2025	
20 July 2024	FW	(England)	Princess Ademiluyi	(England) Charlton Athletic	2 January 2025	
25 July 2024	DF	(Algeria)	Inès Belloumou	(Italy) Lazio	27 January 2025	
26 July 2024	MF	(England)	Keira Flannery	(England) Sunderland	End of season	
1 August 2024	DF	(Republic of Ireland)	Jessie Stapleton	(England) Sunderland	End of season	
7 September 2024	GK	(United States)	Katelin Talbert	(England) Tottenham Hotspur	31 December 2024	
18 January 2025	MF	(England)	Ellie Moore (Note: Dual registration)	(England) Hashtag United	End of season	
24 January 2025	GK	(United States)	Katelin Talbert	(England) Aston Villa	End of season	
27 January 2025	DF	(Algeria)	Inès Belloumou	(Sweden) Malmö	End of season	
30 January 2025	DF	(England)	Shannon Cooke	(England) Birmingham City	End of season	
22 February 2025	MF	(Turkey)	Halle Houssein	(Turkey) Beylerbeyi	End of season	
