= Viviane Asseyi =

French footballer (born 1993)

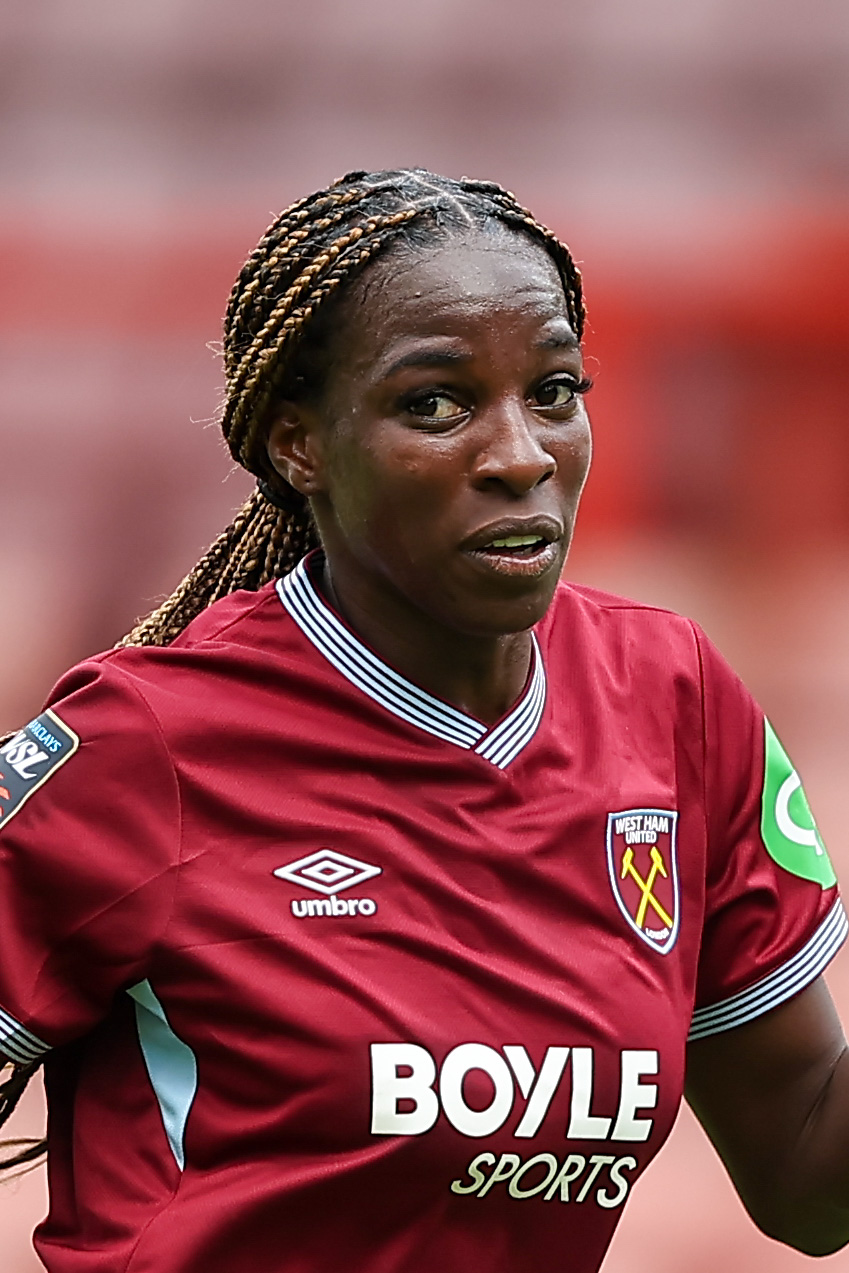
- Asseyi playing for West Ham United in 2025

Personal information
- Full name: Viviane Marie-Louise Blanche Asseyi
- Date of birth: 20 November 1993 (age 33)
- Place of birth: Mont-Saint-Aignan, France
- Height: 1.61 m (5 ft 3 in)
- Position: Forward

Team information
- Current team: West Ham United
- Number: 20

Youth career
- 2000–2008: US Queuvillaise

Senior career*
| Years | Team | Apps | (Gls) |
| 2008–2009 | Rouen | 25 | (23) |
| 2010–2016 | Montpellier | 124 | (43) |
| 2016–2018 | Marseille | 42 | (13) |
| 2018–2020 | Bordeaux | 38 | (24) |
| 2020–2022 | Bayern Munich | 36 | (13) |
| 2022– | West Ham United | 96 | (30) |

International career
| 2008–2009 | France U16 | 10 | (5) |
| 2009 | France U17 | 5 | (1) |
| 2010–2012 | France U19 | 17 | (4) |
| 2014–2017 | France U23 | 10 | (1) |
| 2013–2023 | France | 66 | (14) |
- * Club domestic league appearances and goals as of 20:58, 21 November 2026 (UTC)

Viviane Marie-Louise Blanche Asseyi (French: [vivjan maʁilwiz blɑ̃ʃ aseji]; born 20 November 1993) is a French professional footballer who plays as a forward for Women Super League club West Ham United.

== Club career ==
Asseyi began her career with amateur club US Quevilly at age 6. Due to Quevilly not having a women's section, at age 16 she played on a mixed team composed mostly of male players. She later joined the women's section of football club FC Rouen, where the youngster scored 23 goals in 28 total appearances. She joined Montpellier midway through the 2009–10 season in January 2010 and played there until moving to Olympique de Marseille ahead of the 2016–17 season.

In 2020, amid the COVID-19 pandemic, she transferred to Bayern Munich in Germany. Upon her arrival at the club, she was welcomed by fellow French citizen Benjamin Pavard, who played for the men's side. She had been in conversations with Bayern about a transfer for a year prior to the move.

In her Bundesliga debut on the first matchday against SC Sand, Asseyi scored, giving Bayern Munich the lead just two minutes in. In November she injured her ankle during a national team training course and had surgery a few days later. At the beginning of March 2021, she returned to the pitch, immediately scored another goal in Freiburg and won the Bundesliga championship with Bayern Munich at the end of the season. A year later, one of her goals - scored with a bicycle kick against 1. FC Köln - was voted goal of the month for March 2022 by the spectators of the Sportschau by a large margin.

On 2 August 2022, Asseyi joined Super League club West Ham United. In the 2023–24 home game against Manchester United, she scored the equalizer making it 1–1 in the 85th minute.

== International career ==
=== Youth ===
Viviane Asseyi played a total of 32 games for the French youth selection teams in the U-16, U-17, and U-19 age groups. In the second qualifying round for the 2012 U-19 European Championship, she scored the goal of the day against the Netherlands.

=== Senior ===
In June 2013, the coach of the senior national team, Bruno Bini, invited her for the first time to a course in preparation for the European Championship and then subsequently called Asseyi into the squad in place of Laëtitia Tonazzi who was retiring. On June 29, 2013, she made her debut for France at age 19 in a friendly against Norway. Bini's successor Philippe Bergeroo occasionally and mainly used her as a substitute. The new national coach Corinne Diacre even put Asseyi in the starting line-up in autumn 2017, with the striker scoring her first goal. Viviane Asseyi was also named in France's 23-player squad for the 2019 World Cup on home soil.

She was nominated for the 2023 World Cup in Australia and New Zealand, played in two of her team's five games. Her team was eliminated in the quarter-finals after penalties against Australia.

== Personal life ==
Asseyi was born in France, and is of Gabonese descent.

== Career statistics ==
=== Club ===
As of match played 15 November 2026

Appearances and goals by club, season and competition
| Club | Season | League | | | National cup (Note: Includes Women's FA Cup, Coupe de France Féminine, DFB-Pokal Frauen) | | League cup (Note: Includes FA Women's League Cup) | | Continental | | Total | |
| Club | Season | Division | Apps | Goals | Apps | Goals | Apps | Goals | Apps | Goals | Apps | Goals |
|---|---|---|---|---|---|---|---|---|---|---|---|---|
| FC Rouen | 2008–09 | D2 Féminine | 16 | 10 | 0 | 0 | — | | — | | 16 | 10 |
| FC Rouen | 2009–10 | D2 Féminine | 9 | 13 | 0 | 0 | — | | — | | 9 | 13 |
| FC Rouen | Total | | 25 | 23 | 0 | 0 | — | | — | | 25 | 23 |
| Montpellier | 2010–11 | D1 Féminine | 11 | 3 | 3 | 0 | — | | 2 | 0 | 16 | 3 |
| Montpellier | 2011–12 | D1 Féminine | 20 | 9 | 4 | 0 | — | | — | | 24 | 9 |
| Montpellier | 2012–13 | D1 Féminine | 18 | 7 | 3 | 0 | — | | — | | 21 | 7 |
| Montpellier | 2013–14 | D1 Féminine | 18 | 8 | 6 | 5 | — | | — | | 24 | 13 |
| Montpellier | 2014–15 | D1 Féminine | 20 | 9 | 4 | 3 | — | | — | | 24 | 12 |
| Montpellier | 2015–16 | D1 Féminine | 19 | 3 | 6 | 2 | — | | — | | 25 | 5 |
| Montpellier | 2016–17 | D1 Féminine | 18 | 4 | 6 | 2 | — | | — | | 24 | 6 |
| Montpellier | Total | | 124 | 43 | 32 | 12 | 0 | 0 | 2 | 0 | 158 | 55 |
| Marseille | 2016–17 | D1 Féminine | 21 | 9 | 1 | 0 | — | | — | | 22 | 9 |
| Marseille | 2017–18 | D1 Féminine | 21 | 4 | 2 | 0 | — | | — | | 23 | 4 |
| Marseille | Total | | 42 | 13 | 3 | 0 | 0 | 0 | 0 | 0 | 45 | 13 |
| Bordeaux | 2018–19 | D1 Féminine | 22 | 12 | 1 | 0 | — | | — | | 23 | 12 |
| Bordeaux | 2019–20 | D1 Féminine | 16 | 12 | 3 | 1 | — | | — | | 19 | 13 |
| Bordeaux | Total | | 38 | 24 | 4 | 1 | 0 | 0 | 0 | 0 | 42 | 25 |
| Bayern Munich | 2019–20 | Frauen-Bundesliga | 0 | 0 | 0 | 0 | — | | 1 | 0 | 1 | 0 |
| Bayern Munich | 2020–21 | Frauen-Bundesliga | 15 | 9 | 3 | 1 | — | | 4 | 0 | 22 | 10 |
| Bayern Munich | 2021–22 | Frauen-Bundesliga | 20 | 5 | 3 | 1 | — | | 6 | 1 | 29 | 7 |
| Bayern Munich | Total | | 35 | 14 | 6 | 2 | 0 | 0 | 11 | 1 | 52 | 17 |
| West Ham United | 2022–23 | Women's Super League | 22 | 6 | 2 | 0 | 5 | 1 | — | | 29 | 7 |
| West Ham United | 2023–24 | Women's Super League | 22 | 6 | 1 | 1 | 3 | 0 | — | | 26 | 7 |
| West Ham United | 2024–25 | Women's Super League | 21 | 9 | 1 | 0 | 4 | 4 | — | | 26 | 13 |
| West Ham United | 2025–26 | Women's Super League | 21 | 2 | 2 | 1 | 4 | 2 | — | | 27 | 5 |
| West Ham United | 2026–27 | Women's Super League | 10 | 7 | 0 | 0 | 3 | 1 | — | | 13 | 8 |
| West Ham United | | | 96 | 30 | 6 | 2 | 19 | 8 | 0 | 0 | 120 | 38 |
| Career total | | | 360 | 147 | 51 | 17 | 19 | 8 | 13 | 1 | 443 | 172 |

=== International ===
As of match played 5 December 2023

Appearances and goals by national team and year
| National team | Year | Apps | Goals |
|---|---|---|---|
| France | 2013 | 1 | 0 |
| France | 2014 | 6 | 0 |
| France | 2015 | 4 | 0 |
| France | 2016 | 2 | 0 |
| France | 2017 | 5 | 4 |
| France | 2018 | 7 | 0 |
| France | 2019 | 14 | 2 |
| France | 2020 | 7 | 3 |
| France | 2021 | 7 | 3 |
| France | 2022 | 5 | 2 |
| France | 2023 | 8 | 0 |
| Total | | 66 | 14 |

Scores and results list France's goal tally first, score column indicates score after each Asseyi goal.

List of international goals scored by Viviane Asseyi
| No. | Date | Venue | Opponent | Score | Result | Competition | Ref |
|---|---|---|---|---|---|---|---|
| 1 | 15 September 2017 | Stade Michel d'Ornano, Caen, France | Chile | 1–0 | 1–0 | Friendly | |
| 2 | 21 October 2017 | Stade du Hainaut, Valenciennes, France | England | 1–0 | 1–0 | Friendly | |
| 3 | 24 October 2017 | Stade Auguste-Delaune, Reims, France | Ghana | 4–0 | 8–0 | Friendly | |
| 4 | 24 October 2017 | Stade Auguste-Delaune, Reims, France | Ghana | 7–0 | 8–0 | Friendly | |
| 5 | 4 March 2019 | Stade de la Vallée du Cher, Tours, France | Uruguay | 1–0 | 6–0 | Friendly | |
| 6 | 9 November 2019 | Nouveau Stade de Bordeaux, Bordeaux, France | Serbia | 6–0 | 6–0 | UEFA Women's Euro 2022 qualifying | |
| 7 | 5 March 2020 | Stade de l'Épopée, Calais, France | Canada | 1–0 | 1–0 | 2020 Tournoi de France | |
| 8 | 22 September 2020 | Toše Proeski Arena, Skopje, North Macedonia | North Macedonia | 6–0 | 7–0 | UEFA Women's Euro 2022 qualifying | |
| 9 | 23 October 2020 | Stade de la Source, Orléans, France | North Macedonia | 6–0 | 11–0 | UEFA Women's Euro 2022 qualifying | |
| 10 | 9 April 2021 | Stade Michel d'Ornano, Caen, France | England | 2–0 | 3–1 | Friendly | |
| 11 | 17 September 2021 | Pampeloponnisiako Stadium, Patras, Greece | Greece | 9–0 | 10–0 | 2023 FIFA Women's World Cup qualification | |
| 12 | 26 November 2021 | Stade de la Rabine, Vannes, France | Kazakhstan | 1–0 | 6–0 | 2023 FIFA Women's World Cup qualification | |
| 13 | 7 October 2022 | Rudolf-Harbig-Stadion, Dresden, Germany | Germany | 1–2 | 1–2 | Friendly | |
| 14 | 11 November 2022 | Estadi Olímpic Camilo Cano, La Nucia, Spain | Norway | 2–1 | 2–1 | Friendly | |

== Honours ==
Bayern Munich

- Bundesliga: 2020–21

Montpellier

- Coupe de France: Finalist 2010, 2011, 2012, 2015

Individual

- Goal of the Month (Germany): March 2022
- West Ham United Goal of the Season: 2023–24
