= Kinga Szemik =

Polish football player (born 1997)

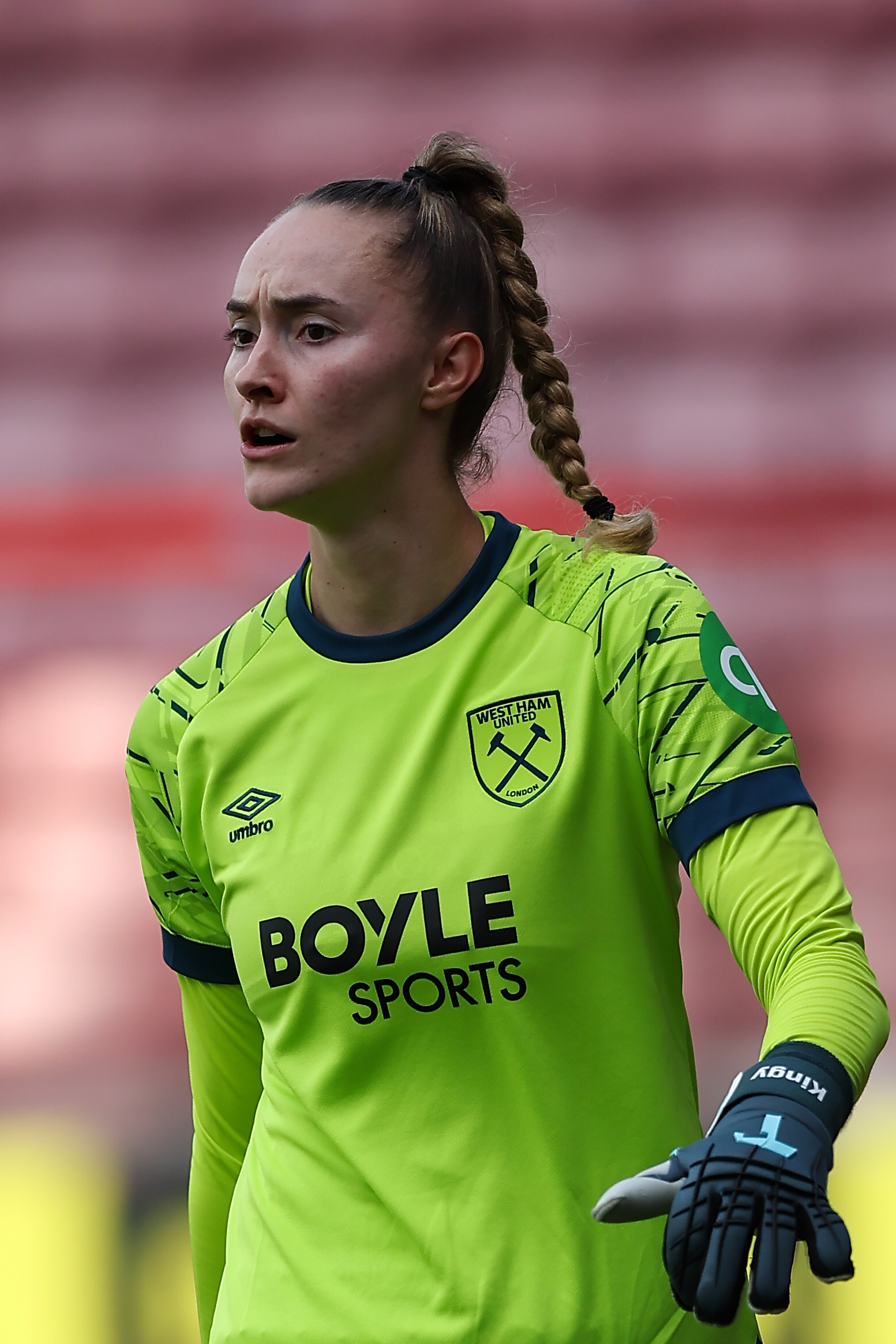
- Szemik with West Ham United in 2025

Personal information
- Full name: Kinga Jadwiga Szemik
- Date of birth: 25 June 1997 (age 29)
- Place of birth: Pietrzykowice, Poland
- Height: 1.82 m (6 ft 0 in)
- Position: Goalkeeper

Team information
- Current team: Hamburger SV
- Number: 12

Youth career
- 2008–2011: Bory Pietrzykowice
- 2011–2014: Mitech Żywiec

College career
Years	Team	Apps	(Gls)
2016–2019	UTRGV Vaqueros	61	(0)

Senior career*
Years	Team	Apps	(Gls)
2014–2016	Mitech Żywiec		
2020–2022	Nantes	28	(0)
2022–2024	Reims	27	(0)
2024–2026	West Ham United	41	(0)
2026–	Hamburger SV	10	(0)

International career^{‡}
2012	Poland U17	3	(0)
2015–2016	Poland U19	6	(0)
2018–	Poland	38	(0)
Medal record
Representing Poland
Women's football
UEFA Women's Under-17 Championship
Winner	2013 Switzerland
- * Club domestic league appearances and goals as of 21 November 2026 ‡ National team caps and goals as of 9 June 2026

Kinga Jadwiga Szemik (Polish: [ˈkiŋɡa jaˈdviɡa ˈʂɛmik]; born 25 June 1997) is a Polish professional footballer who plays as a goalkeeper for Frauen-Bundesliga club Hamburger SV and the Poland national team.

== Club career ==
A youth academy graduate of Mitech Żywiec, Szemik made her senior team debut on 17 April 2014 in a 3–1 win against KKP Bydgoszcz. She left the club after the 2015–16 Ekstraliga season to continue her studies in United States. She attended University of Texas Rio Grande Valley, where she played for UTRGV Vaqueros from 2016 to 2019.

On 15 May 2020, Szemik joined French Division 2 Féminine club Nantes. On 25 July 2022, she signed a one-year contract with Reims in Division 1 Féminine. Even though she began her Reims career as a second-choice goalkeeper behind Emily Alvarado, Szemik became club's starting goalkeeper after Alvarado moved to Houston Dash in April 2023. Szemik signed a one-year contract extension with the club in the same month. During the 2023–24 season, she played all 22 matches in the regular season and helped her club to reach the play-offs.

On 1 July 2024, Szemik joined Women's Super League club West Ham United on a three-year contract. On 30 July 2026, she joined Frauen-Bundesliga club Hamburger SV.

== International career ==
Szemik has represented Poland at various youth levels. She was part of Poland under-17 team which won the 2013 UEFA Women's Under-17 Championship.

Szemik made her senior team debut on 4 October 2018 in a 3–0 win against Estonia. She kept clean sheets in both matches against Austria in the second round of UEFA Women's Euro 2025 qualifying play-offs and helped Poland to qualify for their first ever major tournament. In June 2025, she was named in the squad for the UEFA Women's Euro 2025.

== Personal life ==
Szemik is the youngest of 11 siblings. Apart from football, she also used to play archery when she was young. Three of her brothers – Krystian, Maciej and Dominik have represented Poland in archery. Szemik is a fan of American rock band Evanescence.

== Career statistics ==
=== Club ===
As of match played 21 November 2026

Appearances and goals by club, season and competition
Club	Season	League			National cup (Note: Includes Coupe de France Féminine, Women's FA Cup)		League cup (Note: Includes Women's League Cup)		Other		Total	
Club	Season	Division	Apps	Goals	Apps	Goals	Apps	Goals	Apps	Goals	Apps	Goals
Nantes	2020–21	D2 Féminine	6	0	0	0	—		—		6	0
Nantes	2021–22	D2 Féminine	22	0	0	0	—		—		22	0
Nantes	Total		28	0	0	0	0	0	0	0	28	0
Reims	2022–23	D1 Féminine	5	0	3	0	—		—		8	0
Reims	2023–24	D1 Féminine	22	0	0	0	—		2 (Note: Appearances in playoffs)	0	24	0
Reims	Total		27	0	3	0	0	0	2	0	32	0
West Ham United	2024–25	Women's Super League	22	0	0	0	1	0	—		23	0
West Ham United	2025–26	Women's Super League	19	0	2	0	1	0	—		22	0
West Ham United	Total		41	0	2	0	2	0	0	0	45	0
Hamburger SV	2026–27	Frauen-Bundesliga	10	0	0	0	—		—		10	0
Career total			106	0	5	0	2	0	2	0	115	0

=== International ===
As of match played 9 June 2026

Appearances and goals by national team and year
National team	Year	Apps	Goals
Poland	2018	1	0
Poland	2019	1	0
Poland	2020	0	0
Poland	2021	0	0
Poland	2022	4	0
Poland	2023	7	0
Poland	2024	10	0
Poland	2025	10	0
Poland	2026	5	0
Total		38	0

== Honours ==
Poland U17

- UEFA Women's Under-17 Championship: 2013
