= Tesco Cup =

Association football competition

The Tesco Cup was an association football competition for young footballers ran in the United Kingdom and sponsored by the retail group Tesco. There were three separate tournaments, a boys' Under 13, a girls' Under 14 and a girls' Under 16. Any team was eligible to enter the draw as long as they were affiliated with their County Football Association who were offered a 'grassroots grant' by Tesco to run the tournaments. In each country the progress to the final stages of the tournament were different:

- England - County Cup (i.e. Birmingham County Football Association) winners competed in the Regional Cup (i.e. West Midlands). Those winners competed in the English national finals the winners of which go to the UK Finals.
- Wales - Area Cup (i.e. North Wales) winners met in the national finals and the winners of that went the UK Finals.
- Scotland - Had their own separate national competitions, the winners of which met the teams from the other countries for the UK Finals.
- Northern Ireland - Had their own separate national competitions, the winners of which met the teams from the other countries for the UK Finals.

The boys' tournament was held six times after kicking off in 2005 and both the girl's competitions were held four times after beginning at the start of the 2007 season. In the 2007/08 season 35 English County FA's (37 for the boys) and 6 Welsh County FA's competed. The 2008/09 competition helped raise £180,000 for grassroots football. The 2010/11 UK final took place at St Andrews home of Birmingham City FC Where Staplehurst beat Ysceifiog Wolves narrowly on penalties after the match had finished 1-1, on 22 May 2011. Previously the finals had been held the Reebok Stadium home of Bolton Wanderers FC and the City of Manchester Stadium home of Manchester City FC.

== Winners ==
Boys Under 13s

- 2005/06 - Hutchinson Vale (Scotland)
- 2006/07 - Harpfields FC (Staffordshire, England)
- 2007/08 - Linfield FC (Northern Ireland)
- 2008/09 - Ashmore Park Rangers (England)
- 2009/10 - Stokesley FC (England)
- 2010/11 - Staplehurst Monarchs (England)

Girls Under 14

- 2007/08 - Northern Belles (Northern Ireland)
- 2008/09 - Manchester City L.F.C. (England)
- 2009/10 - Newry Girls (Northern Ireland)
- 2010/11 - Hibernians (Scotland)

Girls Under 16

- 2007/08 - Hibernians (Scotland)
- 2008/09 - Manchester United Girls (England)
- 2009/10 - West Ham United L.F.C. (England)
- 2010/11 - Manchester City L.F.C. (England)
