= Constance Picaud =

French footballer (born 1998)

- Picaud-Inconnu in 2026

Personal information
- Full name: Constance Lara Colline Picaud-Inconnu
- Birth name: Constance Lara Colline Picaud
- Date of birth: 5 July 1998 (age 28)
- Place of birth: Challans, France
- Height: 1.78 m (5 ft 10 in)
- Position: Goalkeeper

Team information
- Current team: West Ham United
- Number: 14

Youth career
- 2007–2012: US Marais Beauvoir S/Mer
- 2012–2013: La Garnache
- 2013–2016: La Roche-sur-Yon

Senior career*
| Years | Team | Apps | (Gls) |
| 2016–2019 | La Roche-sur-Yon | 53 | (0) |
| 2019–2021 | Le Havre | 36 | (0) |
| 2021–2024 | Paris Saint-Germain | 19 | (0) |
| 2024–2026 | Fleury | 40 | (0) |
| 2026– | West Ham United | 5 | (0) |

International career^{‡}
| 2015 | France U17 | 2 | (0) |
| 2023– | France | 17 | (0) |
Medal record
Women's football
Representing France
UEFA Women's Nations League
| Runner-up | 2024 |
| Third place | 2025 |
- * Club domestic league appearances and goals as of 4 October 2026 ‡ National team caps and goals as of 10 October 2026

Constance Lara Colline Picaud-Inconnu (née Picaud; born 5 July 1998) is a French professional footballer who plays as a goalkeeper for Women's Super League club West Ham United and the France national team.

== Club career ==
On 16 July 2021, Picaud joined Paris Saint-Germain on a three-year deal until June 2024. On 28 June 2024, she joined Fleury on a one-year contract. On 27 May 2026, Women's Super League club West Ham United announced the signing of Picaud on a three-year contract.

== International career ==
Picaud is a former France youth international. She received her first call-up to the senior team in February 2021. She made her debut for the team on 18 February 2023 in a 5–1 win against Uruguay.

Picaud was called up to the France squad for the 2023 FIFA Women's World Cup. In July 2024, she was named in France's squad for the 2024 Olympics. In June 2025, she was named in the squad for the UEFA Women's Euro 2025.

== Career statistics ==
=== Club ===
As of match played 12 September 2026

Appearances and goals by club, season and competition
| Club | Season | League | | | National cup (Note: Includes Coupe de France Féminine, Women's FA Cup) | | League cup (Note: Includes Coupe LFFP, WSL Players Cup) | | Continental | | Other | | Total | |
| Club | Season | Division | Apps | Goals | Apps | Goals | Apps | Goals | Apps | Goals | Apps | Goals | Apps | Goals |
|---|---|---|---|---|---|---|---|---|---|---|---|---|---|---|
| La Roche-sur-Yon | 2016–17 | Seconde Ligue | 14 | 0 | 2 | 0 | — | | — | | — | | 16 | 0 |
| La Roche-sur-Yon | 2017–18 | Seconde Ligue | 17 | 0 | 4 | 0 | — | | — | | — | | 21 | 0 |
| La Roche-sur-Yon | 2018–19 | Seconde Ligue | 22 | 0 | 3 | 0 | — | | — | | — | | 25 | 0 |
| La Roche-sur-Yon | Total | | 53 | 0 | 9 | 0 | 0 | 0 | 0 | 0 | 0 | 0 | 62 | 0 |
| Le Havre | 2019–20 | Seconde Ligue | 15 | 0 | 3 | 0 | — | | — | | — | | 18 | 0 |
| Le Havre | 2020–21 | Première Ligue | 21 | 0 | 1 | 0 | — | | — | | — | | 22 | 0 |
| Le Havre | Total | | 36 | 0 | 4 | 0 | 0 | 0 | 0 | 0 | 0 | 0 | 40 | 0 |
| Paris Saint-Germain | 2021–22 | Première Ligue | 1 | 0 | 0 | 0 | — | | 0 | 0 | — | | 1 | 0 |
| Paris Saint-Germain | 2022–23 | Première Ligue | 6 | 0 | 5 | 0 | — | | 1 (Note: Appearance(s) in UEFA Women's Champions League) | 0 | 0 | 0 | 12 | 0 |
| Paris Saint-Germain | 2023–24 | Première Ligue | 12 | 0 | 3 | 0 | — | | 5 | 0 | 0 | 0 | 20 | 0 |
| Paris Saint-Germain | Total | | 19 | 0 | 8 | 0 | 0 | 0 | 6 | 0 | 0 | 0 | 33 | 0 |
| Fleury | 2024–25 | Première Ligue | 18 | 0 | 0 | 0 | — | | — | | — | | 18 | 0 |
| Fleury | 2025–26 | Première Ligue | 22 | 0 | 0 | 0 | 1 | 0 | — | | — | | 23 | 0 |
| Fleury | Total | | 40 | 0 | 0 | 0 | 1 | 0 | 0 | 0 | 0 | 0 | 41 | 0 |
| West Ham United | 2026–27 | Women's Super League | 2 | 0 | 0 | 0 | 0 | 0 | — | | — | | 2 | 0 |
| Career total | | | 150 | 0 | 21 | 0 | 1 | 0 | 6 | 0 | 0 | 0 | 178 | 0 |

=== International ===
As of match played 10 October 2026

Appearances and goals by national team and year
| National team | Year | Apps | Goals |
|---|---|---|---|
| France | 2023 | 6 | 0 |
| France | 2024 | 6 | 0 |
| France | 2025 | 1 | 0 |
| France | 2026 | 4 | 0 |
| Total | | 17 | 0 |

== Honours ==
Paris Saint-Germain

- Coupe de France: 2021–22, 2023–24

France

- UEFA Women's Nations League runner-up: 2023–24
