= Seraina Piubel =

Swiss footballer (born 2000)

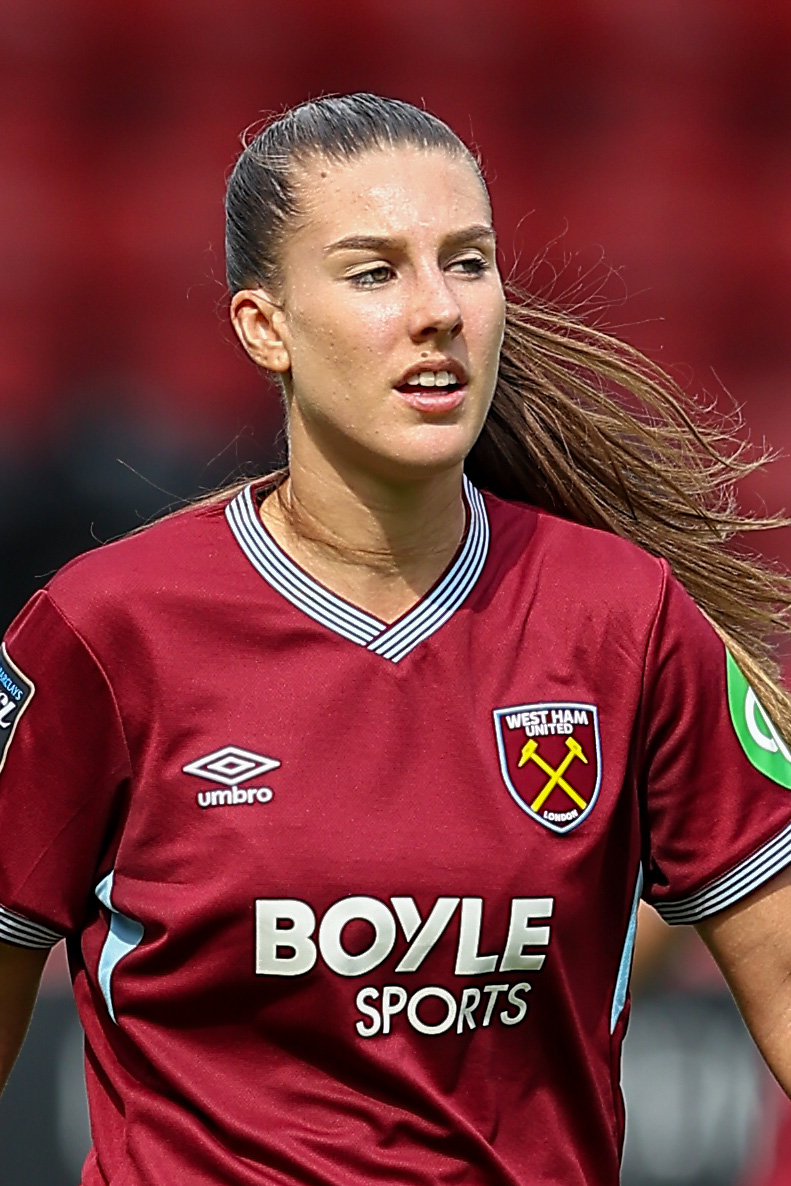
- Piubel in 2025

Personal information
- Full name: Seraina Severin Piubel
- Date of birth: 2 June 2000 (age 26)
- Place of birth: Wettingen, Switzerland
- Height: 1.68 m (5 ft 6 in)
- Position: Midfielder

Team information
- Current team: West Ham United
- Number: 77

Senior career*
Years	Team	Apps	(Gls)
2017–2024	Zürich	130	(35)
2024–	West Ham United	41	(3)

International career^{‡}
2016	Switzerland U16	3	(0)
2016–2017	Switzerland U17	11	(2)
2017–2019	Switzerland U19	22	(4)
2021–	Switzerland	28	(4)
- * Club domestic league appearances and goals as of 15:54, 15 September 2026 (UTC) ‡ National team caps and goals as of 10 October 2026

Seraina Severin Piubel (Swiss Standard German: [seˈraɪna ˈpi̯uːbl̩]; born 2 June 2000) is a Swiss professional footballer who plays as a midfielder for Women's Super League club West Ham United and the Switzerland national team.

== Club career ==
=== Zürich ===
Piubel played for FC Fislisbach in her youth. At the age of 13, she was accepted into the Footeco support program and switched to FC Zürich. From 2015 to 2016, she played for a year in the FC Red Star Zürich U-15 boys' team before moving back to FC Zürich. On 6 August 2016 she made her debut in the Super League, coming on as a 75th-minute substitute in the game against the BSC YB. On 25 August 2016, she played in the Champions League qualifier against KFF Vllaznia Shkodër where she played the full game, and scored a goal in the 85th minute.

In the 2017/18 season, Piubel was used regularly, mostly as a substitute. On 11 October 2017 the game against FC Gintra was their UEFA Women's Champions League debut, coming on in the 67th minute. She has been one of the regular players at FCZ since the 2020/21 season.

In January 2022, she was nominated by a panel of experts as one of three players for the AXA Women's Super League 2021 award. Ultimately, Sandy Maendly won the award. Piubel was also nominated for this award the following year, but the winner was Fabienne Humm.

Piubel won the AXA Women’s Super League Player award.

=== West Ham United ===
On 9 September 2024, it was announced that Piubel had signed a three-year-contract with Women's Super League side West Ham United.

== International career ==
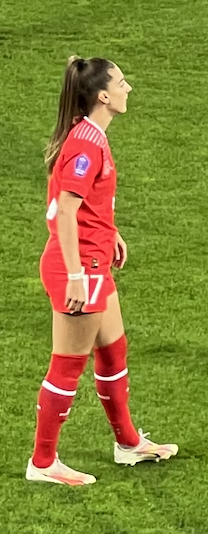
Piubel playing against Italy on 22 September 2023

On 18 September 2020, Piubel played her first match for Switzerland against Croatia in qualifying for the Euro 2022, ending in a 1–1 draw.

On 11 April 2023, she scored her first international goal against Iceland in a friendly match, but eventually lost 2–1.

Piubel was called up to the Switzerland squad for the 2023 World Cup. In Switzerland's opening match against Philippines, Piubel scored the second goal for a 2–0 win.

== Career statistics ==
=== Club ===
As of match played 12 September 2026

Appearances and goals by club, season and competition
Club	Season	League			National cup (Note: Includes Swiss Women's Cup, Women's FA Cup)		League cup (Note: Includes Women's League Cup)		Continental (Note: Includes UEFA Women's Champions League)		Others		Total	
Club	Season	Division	Apps	Goals	Apps	Goals	Apps	Goals	Apps	Goals	Apps	Goals	Apps	Goals
FC Zürich	2016–17	Swiss Women's Super League	1	0	0	0	—		1	0	—		2	0
FC Zürich	2017–18	Swiss Women's Super League	17	0	3	1	—		4	0	—		24	1
FC Zürich	2018–19	Swiss Women's Super League	18	7	2	0	—		1	0	—		21	7
FC Zürich	2019–20	Swiss Women's Super League	14	1	2	1	—		2	0	—		18	2
FC Zürich	2020–21	Swiss Women's Super League	28	7	4	1	—		—		—		32	8
FC Zürich	2021–22	Swiss Women's Super League	17	3	5	3	—		1	0	5 (Note: Appearance(s) in Swiss Women's Super League Playoff)	1	28	7
FC Zürich	2022–23	Swiss Women's Super League	17	12	3	1	—		10	3	5	2	35	18
FC Zürich	2023–24	Swiss Women's Super League	18	5	1	0	—		3	1	5	0	27	6
FC Zürich	Total		130	35	20	7	0	0	22	4	15	3	187	49
West Ham United	2024–25	Women's Super League	22	1	1	0	5	2	—		—		28	3
West Ham United	2025–26	Women's Super League	17	2	2	0	3	1	—		—		22	3
West Ham United	2026–27	Women's Super League	2	0	0	0	0	0	—		—		2	0
West Ham United	Total		41	3	3	0	8	3	0	0	0	0	52	6
Career total			171	38	23	7	8	3	22	4	15	3	239	55

=== International ===
As of match played 9 October 2026

Appearances and goals by national team and year
National team	Year	Apps	Goals
Switzerland	2021	1	0
Switzerland	2022	0	0
Switzerland	2023	15	3
Switzerland	2024	5	0
Switzerland	2025	4	0
Switzerland	2026	3	1
Total		28	4

Scores and results list Switzerland's goal tally first, score column indicates score after each Piubel goal.

List of international goals scored by Seraina Piubel
No.	Date	Venue	Opponent	Score	Result	Competition
1	11 April 2023	Letzigrund, Zürich, Switzerland	Iceland	1–1	1–2	Friendly
2	30 June 2023	Tissot Arena, Biel/Bienne, Switzerland	Zambia	2–3	3–3	Friendly
3	21 July 2023	Forsyth Barr Stadium, Dunedin, New Zealand	Philippines	2–0	2–0	2023 FIFA Women's World Cup
4	5 June 2026	Cornaredo Stadium, Lugano, Switzerland	Malta	2–1	6–1	2027 FIFA Women's World Cup qualification

== Honours ==
FC Zürich

- Swiss Championship: 2018, 2019, 2022, 2023
- Swiss Women's Cup: 2018, 2019, 2022
