= Yu Endō =

Japanese footballer

Yu Endo 遠藤 優
- Endo in 2026

Personal information
- Date of birth: 29 October 1997 (age 29)
- Place of birth: Saitama, Japan
- Height: 1.57 m (5 ft 2 in)
- Position: Full back

Team information
- Current team: West Ham United
- Number: 2

Youth career
- 2010–2015: Urawa Reds

Senior career*
Years	Team	Apps	(Gls)
2016–2025	Urawa Reds	108	(7)
2025–	West Ham United	16	(0)

International career^{‡}
2024–	Japan	2	(0)
- * Club domestic league appearances and goals as of 15:00, 15 September 2026 (UTC) ‡ National team caps and goals as of 17:24, 31 December 2025 (UTC)

Yu Endo (遠藤 優, Endo Yu; Japanese: [endoː juː]; born 29 October 1997) is a Japanese professional footballer who plays as a defender for Women's Super League club West Ham United and the Japan national team.

== Club career ==
Endo made her WE League debut on 12 September 2021.

On 1 August 2025, Endo signed for English Women's Super League club West Ham United on a two-year contract following her departure from Urawa Reds at the end of her contract the previous season.

== Career statistics ==
=== Club ===
As of match played 12 September 2026

Appearances and goals by club, season and competition<
Club	Season	League			National cup (Note: Includes Empress's Cup, Women's FA Cup)		League cup (Note: Includes Nadeshiko League Cup, WE League Cup, Women's League Cup)		Continental		Total	
Club	Season	Division	Apps	Goals	Apps	Goals	Apps	Goals	Apps	Goals	Apps	Goals
Urawa Reds	2016	Nadeshiko League	1	0	3	0	7	1	—		11	1
Urawa Reds	2017	Nadeshiko League	0	0	1	0	2	0	—		3	0
Urawa Reds	2018	Nadeshiko League	3	1	3	0	7	0	—		13	1
Urawa Reds	2019	Nadeshiko League	11	0	1	0	5	0	—		17	0
Urawa Reds	2020	Nadeshiko League	13	0	5	1	—		—		18	1
Urawa Reds	2021–22	WE League	19	2	1	0	—		—		20	2
Urawa Reds	2022–23	WE League	17	2	2	0	5	0	—		24	2
Urawa Reds	2023–24	WE League	22	2	4	0	5	1	3 (Note: Appearance(s) in AFC Women's Club Championship)	1	34	4
Urawa Reds	2024–25	WE League	22	0	4	0	1	0	4 (Note: Appearance(s) in AFC Women's Champions League)	1	31	1
Urawa Reds	Total		108	7	24	1	32	2	7	2	171	12
West Ham United	2025–26	Women's Super League	15	0	1	0	4	0	—		20	0
West Ham United	2026–27	Women's Super League	1	0	0	0	0	0	—		1	0
West Ham United	Total		16	0	1	0	4	0	0	0	21	0
Career total			124	7	25	1	36	2	7	2	192	12

=== International ===
As of match played 9 July 2025

Appearances and goals by national team and year
National team	Year	Apps	Goals
Japan	2024	1	0
Japan	2025	1	0
Total		2	0
