= Eva Nyström =

Finnish footballer (born 1999)

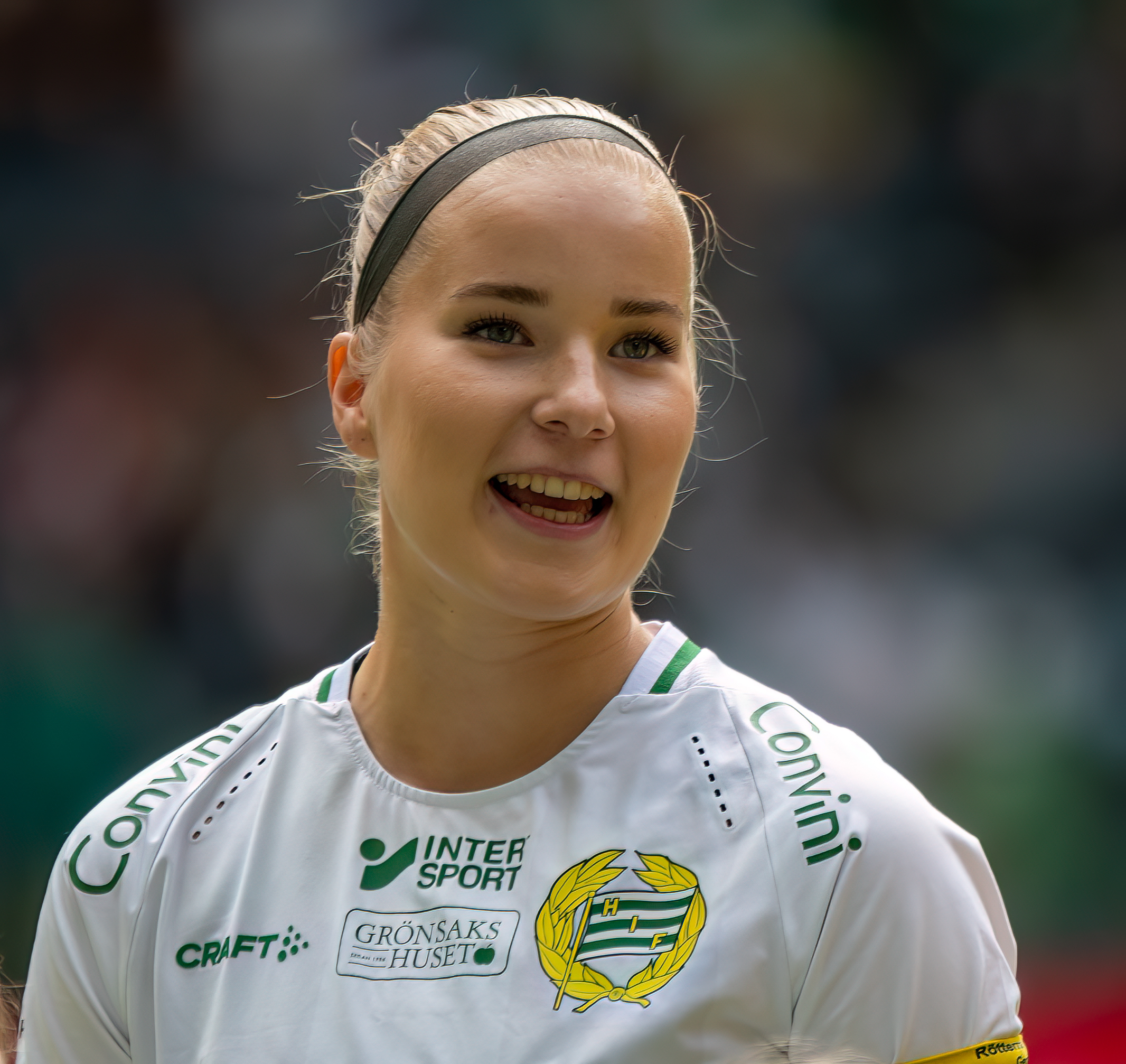
- Nyström with Hammarby in 2022

Personal information
- Full name: Eva Ulrika Nyström
- Date of birth: 29 November 1999 (age 26)
- Place of birth: Helsinki, Finland
- Position: Centre-back

Team information
- Current team: West Ham United
- Number: 13

Youth career
- 2006–2014: Viikingit
- 2015–2016: PK-35 Vantaa

Senior career*
Years	Team	Apps	(Gls)
2014	Viikingit	2	(0)
2016–2018	PK-35 Vantaa	22	(3)
2019	AIK	26	(8)
2020	Umeå IK	21	(2)
2021–2024	Hammarby IF	94	(7)
2025–	West Ham United	27	(0)

International career^{‡}
2015–2015	Finland U17	5	(0)
2022	Finland U23	1	(0)
2022–	Finland	43	(4)
- * Club domestic league appearances and goals as of 17:04, 5 November 2026 (UTC) ‡ National team caps and goals as of 08:23, 15 October 2026 (UTC)

Eva Ulrika Nyström (Finland Swedish: [ˈeːvɑ ʉlˈriːkɑ ˈnyːstrøm]; born 29 November 1999) is a Finnish professional footballer who plays as a centre-back for Women's Super League club West Ham United and the Finland national team.

== Club career ==
=== PK-35 Vantaa ===
Born in Helsinki, Nyström started to play youth football with local club FC Viikingit, and made her senior debut in 2014 for the club's first team in Naisten Ykkönen, the second level in Finland. One year later, she moved to PK-35 Vantaa, and in 2017, she made her debut for the club in the Kansallinen Liiga, the domestic top tier, making ten league appearances in total. The following season, in 2018, the club was crowned Finnish champions, with Nyström only playing 12 league games due to injuries.

=== AIK and Umeå IK ===
On 14 January 2019, Nyström signed a one-year contract with AIK, in the Swedish second division Elitettan. Throughout the year, she played 26 league games, scoring eight goals, although AIK missed out on a promotion by finishing 4th in the table.

On 28 November 2019, Nyström signed a two-year contract with Umeå IK in Damallsvenskan, Sweden's top tier, effective in January 2020. She went on to play 21 league games, scoring twice, but was unable to save the club from suffering a relegation.

=== Hammarby IF ===
On 4 December 2020, Nyström signed a two-year contract with Hammarby IF in Damallsvenskan, effective in January 2021. She established herself as a starting centre-back and enjoyed the team's style of play. Throughout the season, she made 21 league appearances, scoring once, helping her side to a 7th place in table.

In 2022, Nyström featured in 25 league games, scoring three goals. She regularly captained the side, as Hammarby finished 5th in the table. On 5 November 2022, Nyström signed a new three-year contract with the club.

On 6 June 2023, Hammarby won the 2022–23 Svenska Cupen. Nyström appeared in the final, that ended in a 3–0 win at home against BK Häcken. The club also won the 2023 Damallsvenskan, claiming its second Swedish championship after 38 years, with Nyström making 24 league appearances.

=== West Ham United ===
On 25 January 2025, West Ham United in Women's Super League announced the signing of Nyström on a two-and-a-half-year contract until 2027. On 21 March 2026, she was injured while making a goal-denying challenge on Stina Blackstenius, and was taken off the pitch on a stretcher.

== International career ==
Nyström was called up to the senior Finnish national team for the first time for a UEFA Women's Euro 2022 qualifying Group E fixture with Scotland in October 2020. She made her national team debut on 16 February 2022, in a 0–5 away loss to France.

On 19 June 2025, Nyström was called up to the Finland squad for the UEFA Women's Euro 2025.

== Personal life ==
Nyström is a self-confessed Manchester United supporter, and harbours ambitions of playing for their Women's Super League team.

== Career statistics ==
=== Club ===
As of match played 1 November 2026

Appearances and goals by club, season and competition
Club	Season	League			National cup (Note: Includes Finnish Women's Cup, Svenska Cupen (women) and Women's FA Cup)		League cup (Note: Includes FA Women's League Cup)		Europe		Total	
Club	Season	Division	Apps	Goals	Apps	Goals	Apps	Goals	Apps	Goals	Apps	Goals
Viikingit	2014	Naisten Ykkönen	2	0	—		—		—		2	0
PK-35 Vantaa	2016	Naisten Liiga	0	0	2	1	—		—		2	1
PK-35 Vantaa	2017	Naisten Liiga	10	2	2	1	—		1 (Note: Appearance(s) in UEFA Women's Champions League)	0	13	3
PK-35 Vantaa	2018	Naisten Liiga	13	1	1	0	—		—		14	1
PK-35 Vantaa	Total		23	3	5	2	0	0	1	0	29	5
AIK	2019	Elitettan	26	8	5	0	—		—		31	8
Umeå IK	2020	Damallsvenskan	21	2	2	0	—		—		23	2
Hammarby	2021	Damallsvenskan	21	1	2	0	—		—		23	1
Hammarby	2022	Damallsvenskan	25	3	5	0	—		—		30	3
Hammarby	2023	Damallsvenskan	24	3	5	1	—		—		29	4
Hammarby	2024	Damallsvenskan	24	0	6	0	—		8	0	38	0
Hammarby	Total		94	7	18	1	0	0	8	0	120	8
West Ham United	2024–25	Women's Super League	7	0	0	0	1	0	—		8	0
West Ham United	2025–26	Women's Super League	17	0	2	0	4	0	—		23	0
West Ham United	2026–27	Women's Super League	3	0	0	0	3	0	—		6	0
West Ham United	Total		27	0	2	0	8	0	0	0	37	0
Career total			193	20	32	3	8	0	9	0	242	23

=== International ===
As of match played 13 October 2026

Appearances and goals by national team and year
National team	Year	Apps	Goals
Finland	2022	3	0
Finland	2023	11	0
Finland	2024	10	1
Finland	2025	12	1
Finland	2026	7	2
Total		43	4

Scores and results list Finland's goal tally first, score column indicates score after each Nyström goal.

List of international goals scored by Eva Nyström
No.	Date	Venue	Opponent	Score	Result	Competition
1	21 February 2024	Pinatar Arena, San Pedro del Pinatar, Spain	Philippines	2–0	4–0	Friendly
2	25 February 2025	Hidegkuti Nándor Stadion, Budapest, Hungary	Hungary	1–0	1–0	2025 UEFA Women's Nations League
3	14 April 2026	Töölö Football Stadium, Helsinki, Finland	Slovakia	4–2	4–2	2027 FIFA Women's World Cup qualification
4	9 June 2026	Tammelan Stadion, Tampere, Finland	Portugal	3–1	3–1	2027 FIFA Women's World Cup qualification

== Honours ==
PK-35 Vantaa

- Naisten Liiga: 2018
- Finnish Women's Cup runner-up: 2017

Hammarby IF

- Svenska Cupen: 2022–23
- Damallsvenskan: 2023

Finland

- Pinatar Cup: 2024
- Cyprus Women's Cup: 2023
