= Ria Bose =

English footballer (born 2006)

Personal information
- Date of birth: 7 February 2006 (age 20)
- Place of birth: England
- Height: 1.57 m (5 ft 2 in)
- Position: Defender

Team information
- Current team: Sunderland (on loan from West Ham United)
- Number: 2

Youth career
- 2011–2019: Brighton & Hove Albion
- 2019–2024: Chelsea

Senior career*
Years	Team	Apps	(Gls)
2024–2026	Sporting CP	1	(0)
2026–	West Ham United	1	(0)
2026–	→ Sunderland (loan)	3	(0)

International career^{‡}
2022	England U16	1	(0)
2022–2023	England U17	7	(0)
2023–2024	England U19	13	(0)
2026–	England U20	5	(0)
- * Club domestic league appearances and goals as of 15 November 2026 ‡ National team caps and goals as of 10:34, 11 October 2026 (UTC)

Ria Bose (born 7 February 2006) is an English footballer who plays as a defender for Women's Super League 2 club Sunderland, on loan from West Ham United.

== Club career ==
Bose came from the Brighton & Hove Albion academy in 2019 and played for Chelsea under-20 from 2022 to 2024.

On 1 September 2024, Sporting CP announced the signing of Bose from Chelsea in a deal that would run until 2026. On 5 October 2024, Bose made her debut for Sporting, coming on as a substitute in a 2–0 win against Torreense.

On 14 January 2026, West Ham United announced that Bose had returned to the UK, signing a two-and-a-half year deal that would run until 2028. She made her club debut in the final match of the season, making a substitute appearance in West Ham's loss to Manchester City.

In September 2026, West Ham sent Bose out on loan to Women's Super League 2 side Sunderland until January 2027.

== International career ==
On 8 July 2024, Bose was called up to the England under-19 squad for the 2024 UEFA Women's Under-19 Championship. She featured in all of England's games on their run to the semi-final, where they lost to eventual winners Spain.

== Career statistics ==
As of match played 15 November 2026

Appearances and goals by club, season and competition
Club	Season	League			National cup		League cup		Europe		Other		Total	
Club	Season	Division	Apps	Goals	Apps	Goals	Apps	Goals	Apps	Goals	Apps	Goals	Apps	Goals
Sporting CP	2024–25	Campeonato Nacional	1	0	0	0	0	0	0	0	0	0	1	0
Sporting CP	2025–26	Campeonato Nacional	0	0	0	0	0	0	0	0	0	0	0	0
Sporting CP	Total		1	0	0	0	0	0	0	0	0	0	1	0
West Ham United	2025–26	Women's Super League	1	0	0	0	—		—		—		1	0
Sunderland (loan)	2026–27	Women's Super League 2	3	0	0	0	3 (Note: Appearance(s) in WSL Players Cup)	0	—		—		6	0
Career total			5	0	0	0	3	0	0	0	0	0	8	0
