= West Ham United F.C. Women =

English football club

West Ham United Women
- Full name: West Ham United Women
- Nickname: The Irons
- Founded: 1991; 35 years ago
- Ground: Victoria Road
- Capacity: 6,078
- Coordinates: 51°32′52″N 0°9′36″E
- Head coach: Rita Guarino
- League: Women's Super League
- 2025–26: WSL, 10th of 12
- Website: whufc.com/en/news/listing/womens-news
Home colours	Away colours	Third colours

West Ham United Women Football Club is an English women's football club affiliated with West Ham United. The club plays in the Women's Super League, the top tier of English women's football. They were formed in 1991 and play home games at Dagenham & Redbridge's Chigwell Construction Stadium on Victoria Road.

== History ==
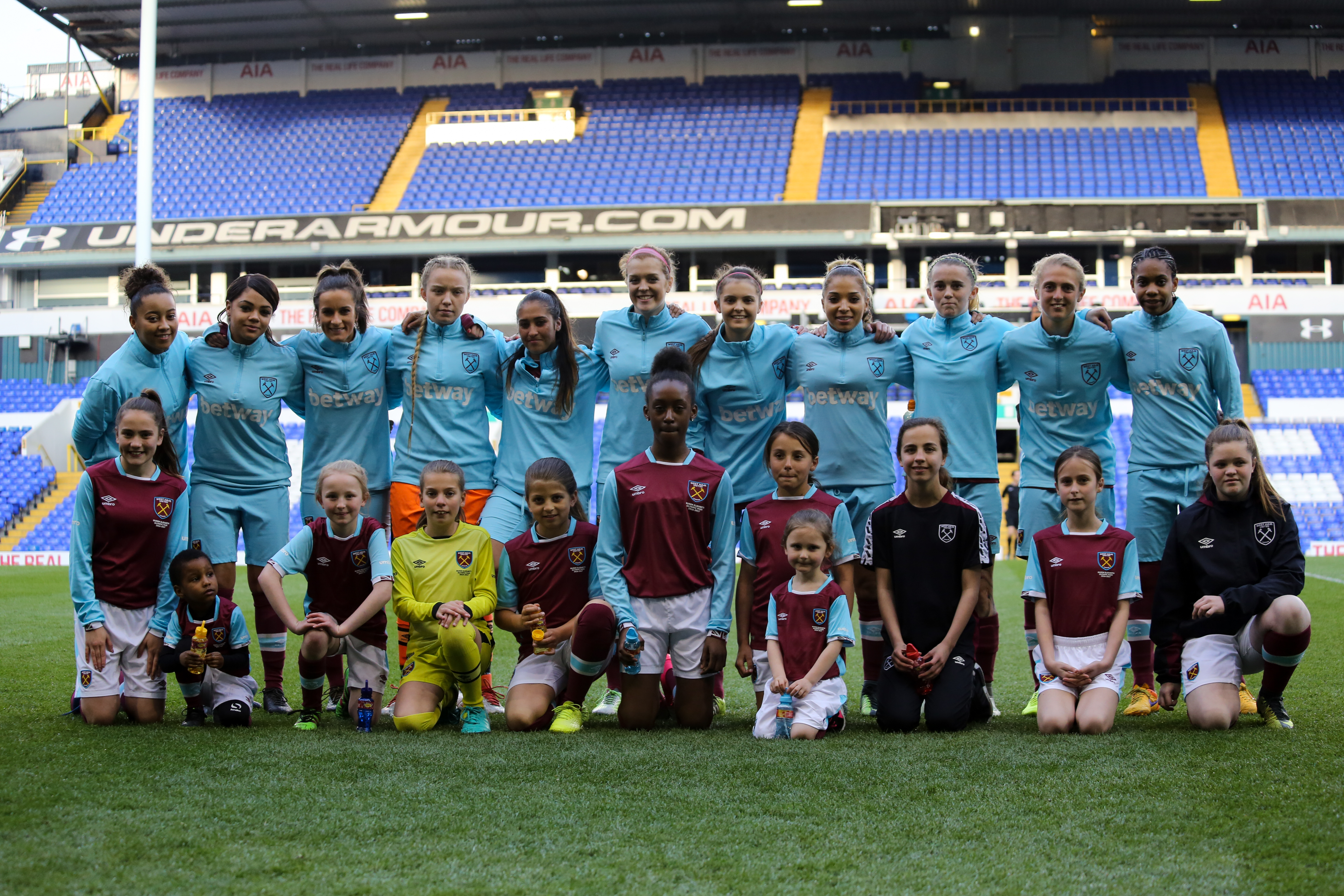
West Ham team with their player escorts in April 2017 prior to a match against Tottenham Hotspur at White Hart Lane

Whilst the 1970s saw a short lived incarnation of West Ham United Ladies, it was early in 1991 when Roger Morgan, the Football in the Community officer at West Ham United, mooted the idea of forming the present ladies section of the club. Following a number of initial coaching sessions to bring in local players and the capture of John Greenacre, who had then recently relinquished his managerial posts at Romford Ladies, to help organise the club, the first friendly match was set for 29 March 1992 resulting in a defeat to Barnet Ladies. Undeterred, two teams were entered into the Greater London Regional Women's Football League for the following season; one in Division 3 and the other in Division 4 and the Hammers opened their first competitive season with a 5–1 victory against Hackney “B” on 27 September 1992 going on to finish the campaign in a respectable fourth place although the second team found life harder and were relegated to the 5th Division. A third-place finish the following season with was sufficient to earn promotion to Division Two and the next season there was a promotion into Division One following another third-place finish.

1995–96 saw a season of consolidation after the two consecutive promotions in two years with a mid table placing, but the season saw the club enter the FA Women's Cup for the first time, having been encouraged by a goalless draw with Arsenal Ladies the previous year in the London FA Women's Cup. The club also embarked on its first overseas tour taking in trips to Germany and Holland. International recognition was furthered as Claire Lacey, the Hammers goalkeeper, was awarded an England cap in an away fixture against Portugal to become the club's first international representative.

Two more season of consolidation as a mid table Division One side in the Greater London League followed as the club went through a difficult period off the pitch, with personnel changes in the backroom staff and ground problems seeing Brampton Manor School, Barking and Little Heath all used as home grounds.

The 1998–99 season saw the Hammers fortunes take an upturn reaching their first cup final in the Russell Cup and more importantly gaining the runners up spot in the league and with it promotion into the Greater London League Premier Division. The momentum continued as the Hammers immediately made an impact in the Premier Division coming second behind the semi professional set up at Fulham, before clinching the title the year after, coupled with a run to the 4th round of the FA Women's Cup.

2000–01 saw the introduction of the now highly successful junior section playing in the Essex County Girls League laying the foundations for another period of growth for the club as a second successful Greater London League Premier League campaign this time saw the Hammers winning the promotion play off and allowed the club to start the 2002–03 season in the South East Combination League, where a fourth-place finish showed the Hammers ability to hold their own at this level. The promise of being able to step up further emerged when the runners up spot was claimed the year after. Hopes were high the club could go one further for the 2004–05 campaign and in a nail-biting finish the Hammers emerged victorious from a winner takes all final league game with Northampton to win the title, only just missing out on the double following a league cup final defeat to the same opponents.

Just 13 seasons after starting out West Ham United Ladies had now reached the FA Women's Premier League and achieved a sixth-place finish in their opening season at this level despite a shaky start as they got accustomed to the higher standard. There were no such problems for the reserve team though, who were only just pipped to the runners up spot in the Premier League (Reserves) Division Two South. The following season was a disappointment as the team started to slide and the club ended up in a situation where they would be relegated if the teams below were to win their games in hand although by the end of the season results had gone in the Hammers favour. The Reserve team finished rock bottom in their division but amongst the junior sections the club continued to flourish and from the junior ranks both management staff and playing personnel were elevated to get the club back on track.

2007–08 saw Tony Marshall take over as first team manager helped by Alex Bonner as coach. The club switched to play home games at Harlow Town and with a massive rebuilding job to be done the Hammers turned to youth with a side featuring many previous junior players from the club, who were more than able to hold their own with a sixth-place finish.

The next season saw continued improvements: a new base at Thurrock, a highest-ever third-place finish in the league, and the first team lifting their first major trophy after winning the Essex FA County Cup. The success spanned across the whole club with the reserve team ending the season top of the Premier (Reserves) Division Two South and amongst the junior side's haul of silverware were the London FA Girls Youth Cup and the Southern Region Under 16 FA Tesco Cup.

The Hammers were again amongst the leading sides in the 2009–10 campaign although too many draws saw them slip to fifth position with the reserve team consolidating following their promotion. Again there was success for the junior sides with the Under 16 team winning the UK Home International Tesco Cup at the Reebok Stadium. 2010–11 saw the side lead the table for much of the winter but were pipped to the promotion spots in the run in eventually finishing in third place. However the Essex FA County Cup was regained and best ever runs in the FA Women's Cup and FA Women's Premier League Cup saw both quarter finals reached.

2011–12 followed a similar pattern with good cup runs taking the club to the Essex FA County Cup final and the FA Women's Premier League Cup quarter final. Again a third-place finish was achieved in the FA Women's Premier League Southern Division.

In Summer 2014, former professional footballer Julian Dicks took charge of the team. His first competitive game was against Spurs Ladies. He helped to improve the team from their 10th-place finish the season and then to a sixth-placed finish in the 2014–15 season, along with a London FA Capital Women's Cup Final date against Charlton Athletic Ladies.

In March 2015, John Hunt and his son Stephen Hunt were appointed Joint Chairman. On 5 June 2015, the club announced the creation of the West Ham Ladies Learning Academy. In July 2015, Marc Nurse became manager replacing ex-professional footballer Julian Dicks, who was promoted to work with the men's first team. Under Nurse, West Ham go on to finish 10th for the 2015–16 season. The season began in controversial circumstances when club captain Stacey Little led a small walkout of players and went to the press. Little had criticised the main club in the press the previous year over a lack of funding. The highlight of the season by far was the Ladies' first and last full league match at Upton Park in the club's last season there before moving to Stratford. The Ladies secured a record crowd of 1,741 as a penalty by captain Katie Bottom sealed a 1–0 win. The game became widely known for an off-the-ball incident when the video of a Spurs defender stamping on the head of West Ham striker Whitney Locke went viral.

During the summer of 2016, the team toured the Netherlands and played two top sides (MSV Duisburg and FC Twente) and were beaten in both matches. The Chairmen then took the decision to replace Nurse as manager and replace him with James Marrs who had recently led Brighton Ladies to promotion but was then sacked in controversial circumstances. Marrs appealed the circumstances of his sacking and in October 2016 an FA hearing held that the finding of the Sussex FA were such that "no reasonable body would have reached" and his record was cleared. The following day West Ham United nevertheless released Marrs as the Hunts were replaced as Chairmen and the Ladies absorbed into the main club. The events leading to the takeover of the Ladies were triggered by unfavourable press coverage of the main club's treatment of the Ladies team. For the rest of the 2016–17 season, the Ladies were managed by the West Ham Foundation coaches finishing 9th. The summer of 2017 saw West Ham Ladies undergo significant changes as the club looked to reach the top Women's Southern League within five years. Jack Sullivan, son of West Ham chairman David Sullivan was named the team's managing director, while Karen Ray took up the role of ladies' general manager. Greg de Carnys also moved over from the Academy to look after the ladies' first team and academy. In the first half of the season, the results were poor with 12 losses from 17 games, and on 9 December 2017, it was announced that de Carnys had parted company with the club and that Ray would take charge of the team on an interim basis. Following this, the results improved, with 11 wins and only 1 loss from the next 14 games, including victories in both the Isthmian League Women's Cup and FA WPL Plate.

=== 2018–present: FA WSL ===
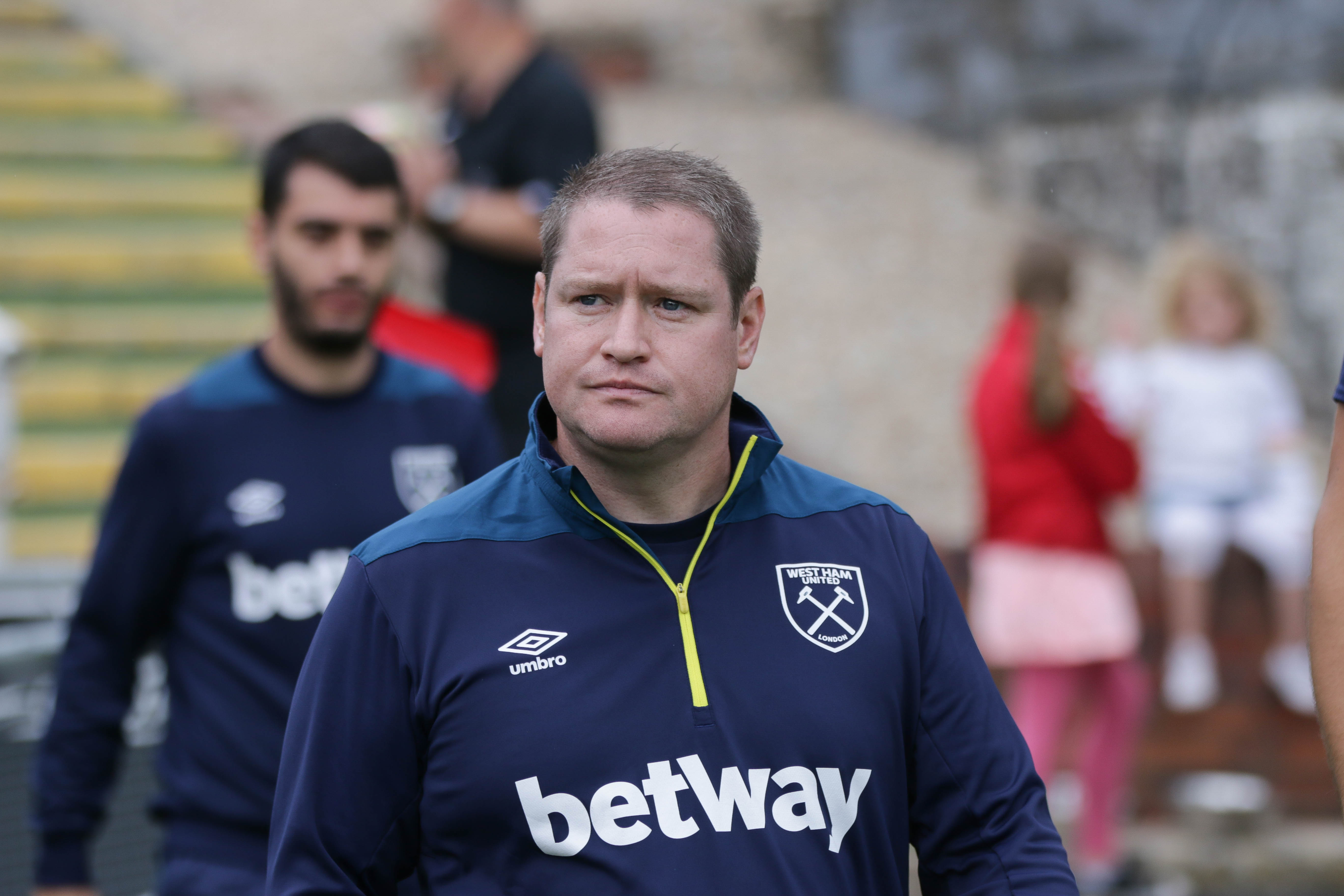
West Ham former manager, Matt Beard, 2018

On 28 May 2018, it was announced that West Ham Ladies had successfully gained entry into the WSL, the top league in England. West Ham Ladies changed their name to West Ham United women's team in July 2018. Former Women's Super League winner Matt Beard was appointed head coach of West Ham United women in June 2018. Beard secured the signings of experienced players including Gilly Flaherty, Claire Rafferty, Jane Ross and Tessel Middag in preparation for the club's first season in the WSL. The club reached the FA Women's Cup Final in May 2019, ultimately losing 3–0 to Manchester City.

Beard and the club agreed to part ways by mutual consent on 19 November 2020. The board named goalkeeping coach Billy Stewart and first-team coach Paul McHugh as interim head coaches while a search for a full-time manager was undertaken, and Olli Harder was appointed as the next manager on 23 December 2020. West Ham went on to finish 8th in the Women's Super League.

Harder left the role on 8 May 2022, after the final game of the season with West Ham having finished 6th, and was replaced by his assistant manager Paul Konchesky.

The Hammers made a good start to the 2022–23 season, with five wins from the first 10 league games of the season seeing them comfortably in the top half of the table. However, after the Christmas break their league form would nose-dive and, despite earning a first ever league point and clean sheet against Arsenal in a home 0–0 draw, it wouldn't be until the penultimate game of the season that West Ham would celebrate another league win. A run to the semi-finals of the League Cup would end in a 7–0 defeat to Chelsea and, on 28 May 2023, West Ham announced Konchesky was leaving his job as manager after the team finished 8th in the WSL, but having only won one league game in 2023.

On 20 July 2023, Rehanne Skinner was appointed manager of the West Ham Women's first team, becoming their first female manager in the FA WSL era.

== Players ==
=== Current squad ===
As of 5 September 2026

Note: Flags indicate national team as defined under FIFA eligibility rules; some limited exceptions apply. Players may hold more than one non-FIFA nationality.

No.	Pos.	Nation	Player
1	GK	FRA	Constance Picaud
2	DF	JPN	Yu Endo
3	DF	ESP	Laia Codina
4	MF	FIN	Oona Siren
5	DF	NOR	Tuva Hansen
7	DF	ALG	Inès Belloumou
8	MF	JPN	Saki Kumagai
9	FW	JPN	Riko Ueki
10	MF	ENG	Katie Zelem (captain)
11	FW	FRA	Kelly Gago
13	DF	FIN	Eva Nyström
15	DF	NOR	Ylinn Tennebø

No.	Pos.	Nation	Player
17	FW	ENG	Ebony Salmon
19	MF	ENG	Sienna Wareing
20	FW	FRA	Viviane Asseyi (vice-captain)
22	DF	SUI	Nadine Riesen
23	FW	WAL	Ffion Morgan
25	GK	IRL	Megan Walsh
26	DF	ENG	Niamh Peacock
27	FW	SUI	Leila Wandeler
28	DF	FRA	Estelle Cascarino
45	GK	ENG	Rebekah Dowsett
77	FW	SUI	Seraina Piubel

==== Out on loan ====
Note: Flags indicate national team as defined under FIFA eligibility rules; some limited exceptions apply. Players may hold more than one non-FIFA nationality.

No.	Pos.	Nation	Player
12	DF	ENG	Ria Bose (on loan at Sunderland until January 2027
21	FW	ENG	Sarah Brasero (on loan at Deportivo Alavés until the end of the 26/27 season)
30	GK	ENG	Katie O'Hanlon (on loan at Aberdeen until the end of the 26/27 season)
33	MF	TUR	Halle Houssein (on loan at Sheffield United until the end of the 26/27 season)
43	DF	TUR	Selin Cemal (on loan at Aberdeen until the end of the 26/27 season)

==== Professional Game Academy ====
The PGA is a revised player pathway which replaced the FA WSL Academy in 2023. The PGA structure provides young players with the opportunity to be selected as part of a professional club’s programme, combining football development with their education.

This pathway will allow the players the opportunity to train with Rita Guarino’s first-team squad, as well as providing them with the chance to learn and develop at the team’s Chadwell Heath training ground.

On 19 July 2025, the 2025/26 PGA players were confirmed.

Note: Flags indicate national team as defined under FIFA eligibility rules; some limited exceptions apply. Players may hold more than one non-FIFA nationality.

No.	Pos.	Nation	Player
44	DF	ENG	Ruby Warwick

== Management ==
As of 18 December 2025.

Executive

Position	Name
Head of Women's Football	Philippa Cartwright

Technical

Position	Name
Head coach	Rita Guarino
Assistant manager	Chris Pipe
Assistant manager	Adam Pengelly
First-Team coach	Steve Kirby
Strength and Conditioning Coach	Francisco Lyons
Performance Analyst	Nicholas Wain

=== Managerial History ===
FA WSL era (includes league, FA Cup and League Cup results)

From	To	Name	Games	Won	Drawn	Lost	Win %	Sources
7 Jun 2018	19 Nov 2020	(England) Matt Beard	60	26	4	30	43.33%	
23 Dec 2020	8 May 2022	(New Zealand) Olli Harder	47	16	11	20	34.04%	
8 May 2022	28 May 2023	(England) Paul Konchesky	29	10	3	16	34.48%	
20 Jul 2023	18 Dec 2025	(England) Rehanne Skinner	69	18	13	38	26.09%	
22 Dec 2025	Present	(Italy) Rita Guarino	13	5	2	6	38.46%	

== Honours ==
League

- South East Champions London Cup
  - Champions: 2004–05
- Greater London Regional Premier League
  - Champions: 2000–01, 2001–02
- Greater London Regional League
  - Play-off winners: 11–12

Cup

- Women's FA Cup
  - Runners-up: 2018–19
- FA Women's Premier League Plate
  - Winners: 2017–18
- Isthmian League Women's Cup
  - Winners: 2017–18
- Essex FA County League
  - Winners: 2008–09, 2010–11

== Seasons ==
=== Key ===
- P = Played
- W = Games won
- D = Games drawn
- L = Games lost
- F = Goals for
- A = Goals against
- Pts = Points
- WSL = Women's Super League
- PL Na = FA Women's Premier League National Division
- PL S = FA Women's Premier League Southern Division
- SE C = South East Combination Women's Football League
- DR = Determining Round
- GS = Group Stage
- R1 = Round 1
- R2 = Round 2
- R3 = Round 3
- R4 = Round 4
- R5 = Round 5
- R6 = Round 6
- QF = Quarter-finals
- SF = Semi-finals
- RU = Runner Up
- CH = Champions

Champions	Runners-up	Promoted	Relegated

Season	League										Cup			Top scorer	
Season	Division	P	W	D	L	F	A	GD	Pts	Pos	FA Cup	WSL Cup	WPL Cup	Name	Goals
2005–06	PL S	22	8	4	10	31	33	-2	28	6th	R3				
2006–07	PL S	22	6	3	13	25	44	-19	21	10th	R4				
2007–08	PL S	22	12	0	10	63	46	17	36	5th	R5				
2008–09	PL S	22	10	9	3	41	20	21	39	3rd	R3				
2009–10	PL S	22	9	9	4	38	24	14	36	5th	R5		R1		
2010–11	PL S	18	10	3	5	29	17	12	33	3rd	R6		QF		
2011–12	PL S	18	10	4	4	36	22	14	34	3rd	R3		QF		
2012–13	PL S	17	6	4	7	20	18	2	22	6th	R3		GS		
2013–14	PL S	20	4	3	13	25	48	-23	15	10th	R2				
2014–15	PL S	22	10	5	7	39	30	9	35	6th	R2		DR		
2015–16	PL S	22	5	4	13	21	60	-39	19	10th	R3		R1		
2016–17	PL S	20	1	6	13	12	59	-47	9	10th	R1		DR		
2017–18	PL S	22	9	2	11	57	42	15	19	7th	R2		DR		
2018–19	WSL	20	7	2	11	25	37	-12	23	7th	RU	QF		Jane Ross	11
2019–20	WSL	14	5	1	8	19	34	-15	16	8th	R4	GS		Kenza Dali	7
2021–22	WSL	22	7	6	9	23	33	-10	27	6th	SF	GS		Claudia Walker/ Dagný Brynjarsdóttir	6
2022–23	WSL	22	6	3	13	23	44	-21	21	8th	R5	SF		Dagný Brynjarsdóttir	11
2023-24	WSL	22	3	6	13	20	45	-25	15	11th	R4	GS		Viviane Asseyi / Riko Ueki	7
2024-25	WSL	22	6	5	11	36	41	-5	23	9th	R4	SF		Viviane Asseyi	13
