= List of Manchester United W.F.C. records and statistics =

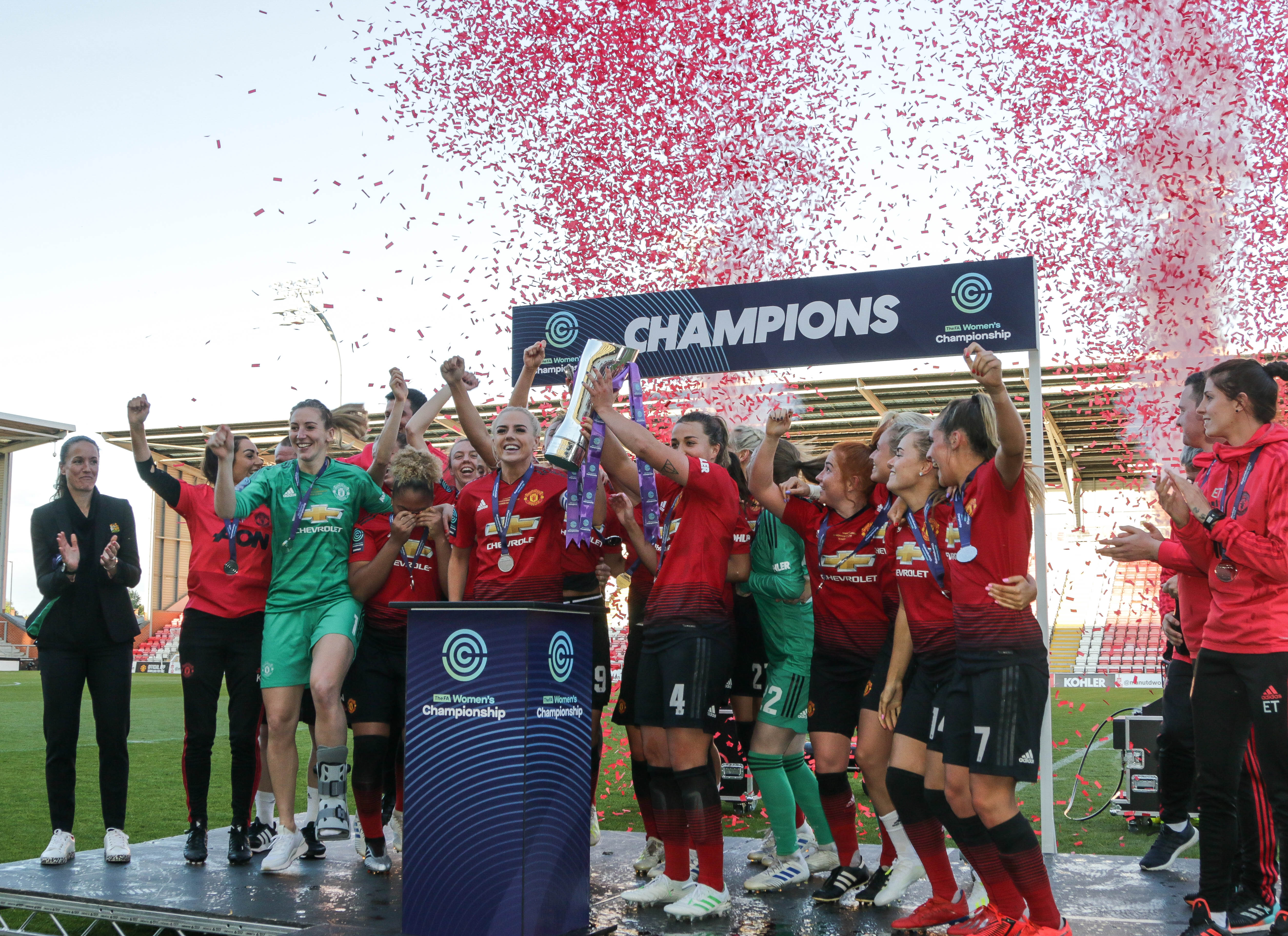
Manchester United celebrate the Championship title in their inaugural season.

Manchester United Women Football Club is an English professional football club based in Leigh, Greater Manchester. The club was formed as a professional outfit in May 2018 and is the direct female affiliate of Manchester United F.C. This list encompasses the major honours won by Manchester United and records set by the club, their managers and their players.

All stats accurate as of match played 22 November 2026.

== Honours ==
=== Domestic ===
==== League ====
Women's Championship (Level 2): 1

- 2018–19

==== Cup ====
Women's FA Cup: 1

- 2023–24

==== Awards ====
Women's Football Awards

- Best Club of the Year (1): 2023
- Best Fan Engagement (1): 2024

== Player records ==
=== Appearances ===
- Youngest first-team player: Layla Drury – 16 years, 220 days (against Burnley, FA Cup, 18 January 2026)
- Oldest first-team player: Rachel Williams – 37 years, 334 days (against Lyon, UEFA Champions League, 10 December 2025)
- Most consecutive League appearances: 102 – Mary Earps, 7 September 2019 – 18 May 2024
- Most consecutive League appearances (outfield player): 99 – Maya Le Tissier, 17 September 2022 – present

==== Most appearances ====
Competitive, professional matches only. Appearances as substitute (in parentheses) included in total.

#	Name	Years	League	FA Cup	League Cup	Europe	Total
1	(England) Ella Toone	2018–	163 (19)	21 (4)	30 (18)	12 (3)	226 (44)
2	(England) Millie Turner	2018–2026	133 (4)	23 (0)	26 (0)	7 (2)	189 (6)
3	(England) Leah Galton	2018–2026	125 (17)	16 (2)	24 (12)	7 (5)	172 (36)
4	(England) Katie Zelem	2018–2024	115 (3)	17 (0)	27 (7)	2 (0)	161 (10)
5	(England) Maya Le Tissier	2022–	99 (0)	17 (0)	20 (2)	16 (0)	152 (2)
6	(England) Mary Earps	2019–2024	102 (0)	15 (0)	6 (1)	2 (0)	125 (1)
7	(Wales) Hayley Ladd	2019–2024	81 (17)	9 (3)	20 (6)	0 (0)	110 (26)
8	(Japan) Hinata Miyazawa	2023–	62 (12)	8 (2)	10 (3)	16 (2)	96 (19)
9	(England) Hannah Blundell	2021–2026	68 (6)	11 (0)	14 (5)	2 (0)	95 (11)
9	(France) Melvine Malard	2023–2026	57 (26)	12 (5)	10 (5)	16 (2)	95 (38)

=== Goalscorers ===
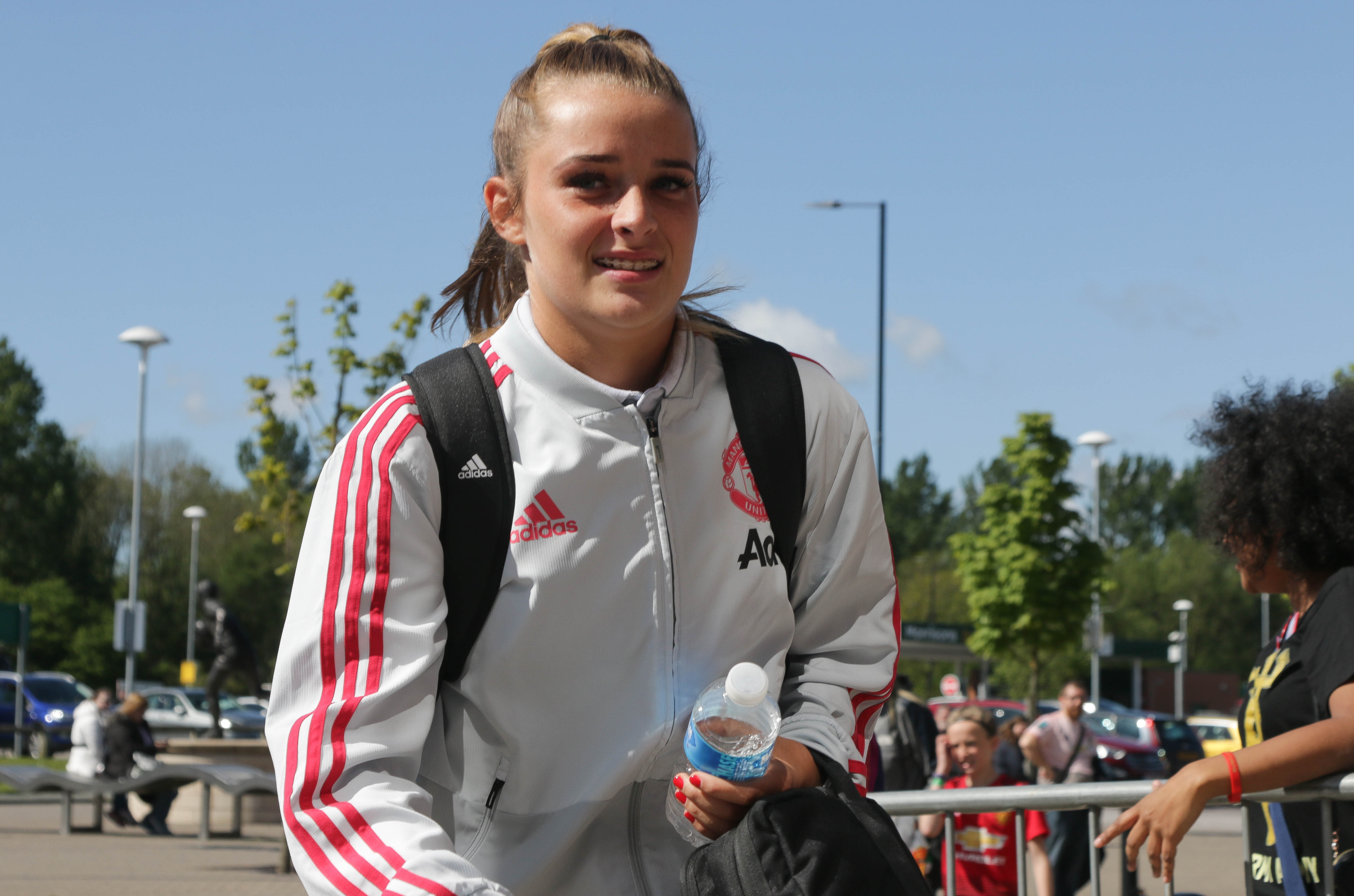
Ella Toone is Manchester United's record goalscorer and appearance maker.

- Most goals in a season in all competitions: 18 – Jessica Sigsworth, 2018–19
- Most League goals in a season: 17 – Jessica Sigsworth, Women's Championship, 2018–19
- Most goals scored in a match: 5
  - Jessica Sigsworth v Aston Villa, Women's Championship, 9 September 2018
  - Ella Toone v Leicester City, League Cup 21 November 2019
- Goals in consecutive league matches: 7 consecutive matches
  - Ella Toone, 25 November 2018 to 24 March 2019
  - Jessica Sigsworth, 10 March 2019 to 7 September 2019
- Youngest first-team goalscorer: Layla Drury – 16 years, 220 days (against Burnley, FA Cup, 18 January 2026)
- Oldest first-team goalscorer: Rachel Williams – 37 years, 1 day (against West Bromwich Albion, Women's FA Cup, 11 January 2025)
- Fastest goal: 14 seconds – Megan Walsh (o.g.) v Brighton & Hove Albion, Women's Super League, 12 February 2020
- Fastest hat-trick: 10 minutes 9 seconds – Jessica Sigsworth v Aston Villa, 9 September 2018
- Most hat-tricks: 3 – Ella Toone (13 February 2019 to 19 January 2025)

==== Overall scorers ====
Competitive, professional matches only, appearances including substitutes appear in brackets.

#	Name	Years	League	FA Cup	League Cup	Europe	Total	Goals per game
1	(England) Ella Toone	2018–	49 (163)	9 (21)	8 (30)	0 (12)	66 (226)	0.29
2	(England) Leah Galton	2018–2026	38 (125)	4 (16)	2 (24)	0 (7)	44 (172)	0.26
3	(Norway) Elisabeth Terland	2024–	20 (49)	1 (6)	3 (8)	8 (9)	32 (72)	0.44
3	(England) Katie Zelem	2018–2024	26 (115)	1 (17)	5 (27)	0 (2)	32 (161)	0.2
5	(England) Lauren James	2018–2021	22 (40)	3 (4)	3 (12)	0 (0)	28 (56)	0.5
6	(England) Alessia Russo	2020–2023	22 (46)	2 (6)	2 (7)	0 (0)	26 (59)	0.44
6	(England) Jessica Sigsworth	2018–2021	22 (47)	1 (6)	3 (13)	0 (0)	26 (66)	0.39
8	(England) Nikita Parris	2022–2024	12 (42)	7 (9)	6 (6)	0 (0)	25 (57)	0.44
9	(France) Melvine Malard	2023–2026	15 (57)	2 (12)	1 (10)	5 (16)	23 (95)	0.24
10	(England) Rachel Williams	2022–2026	9 (59)	8 (14)	4 (12)	0 (6)	21 (90)	0.23

=== Goalkeepers ===
- Most clean sheets in a season in all competitions: 19 – Siobhan Chamberlain, 2018–19
- Most League clean sheets in a season: 14 – Mary Earps, Women's Super League, 2022–23
- Clean sheets in consecutive league matches: 5 consecutive matches

Siobhan Chamberlain, 9 September 2018 to 4 November 2018
Mary Earps, 17 September 2022 to 6 November 2022

- Youngest first-team goalkeeper: Fran Bentley – 17 years, 152 days (against Millwall Lionesses, Women's Championship, 25 November 2018)
- Oldest first-team goalkeeper: Siobhan Chamberlain – 35 years, 248 days (against Crystal Palace, Women's Championship, 20 April 2019)

==== Overall clean sheets ====
Competitive, professional matches only, appearances including substitutes appear in brackets.

#	Name	Years	League	FA Cup	League Cup	Europe	Total	Goals per game
1	(England) Mary Earps	2019–2024	46 (102)	6 (15)	3 (6)	0 (2)	55 (125)	0.98
2	(United States) Phallon Tullis-Joyce	2023–	24 (54)	4 (7)	5 (10)	8 (12)	41 (83)	0.84
3	(England) Siobhan Chamberlain	2018–2019	13 (18)	2 (3)	4 (6)	0 (0)	19 (27)	0.52
4	(England) Emily Ramsey	2018–2023	2 (2)	1 (1)	1 (3)	0 (0)	4 (6)	0.67
5	(England) Sophie Baggaley	2021–2023	0 (0)	0 (0)	3 (10)	0 (0)	3 (10)	1.3
6	(England) Fran Bentley	2018–2022	1 (1)	1 (1)	0 (0)	0 (0)	2 (2)	0
7	(Germany) Janina Leitzig	2026–	0 (0)	0 (0)	1 (5)	0 (0)	1 (5)	1.2

=== Individual awards ===
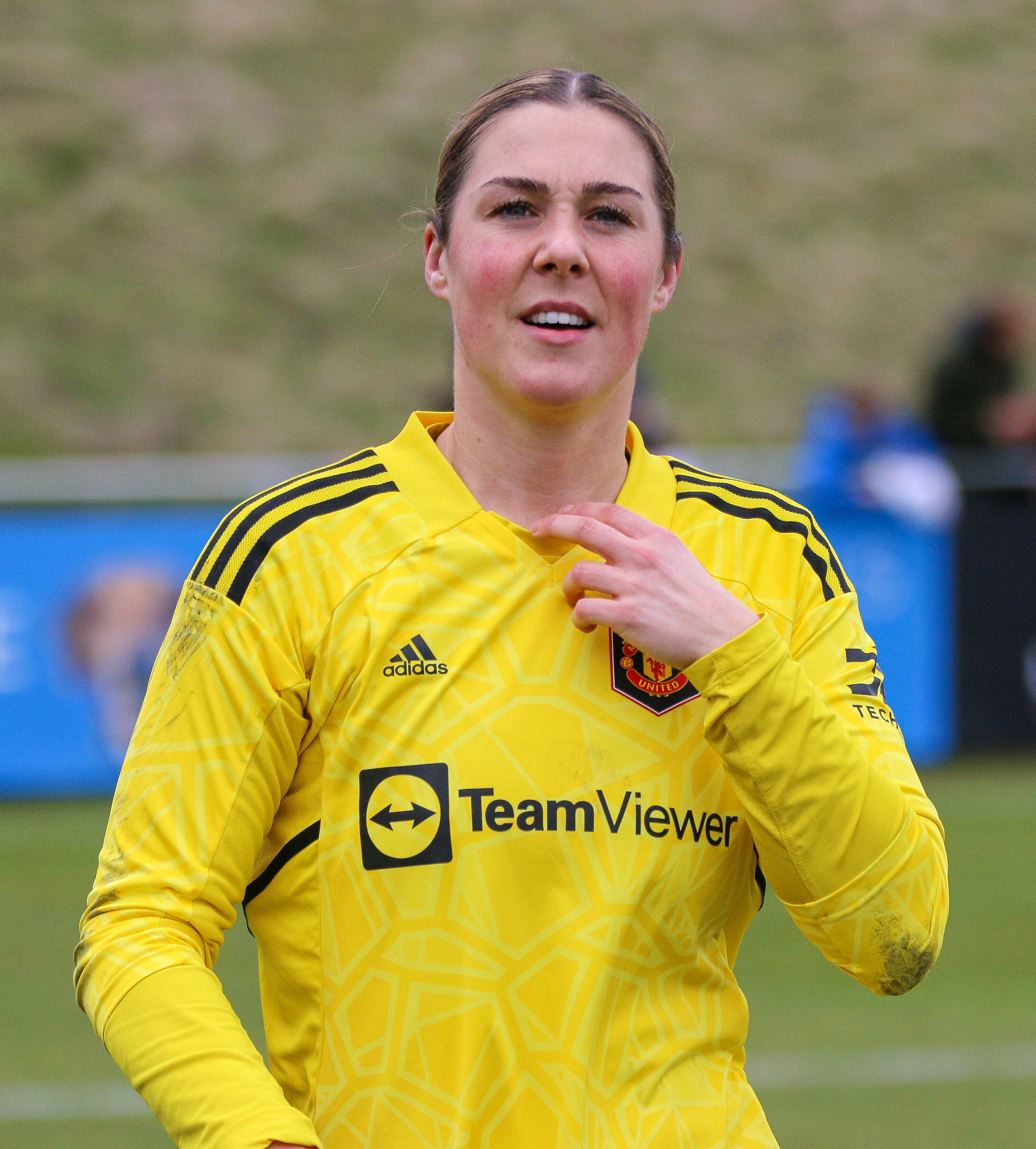
Mary Earps won The Best FIFA Goalkeeper award while playing for Manchester United in 2022 and 2023.

FIFA

The following players have won FIFA awards while playing for Manchester United:

- The Best FIFA Women's Goalkeeper
  - (England) Mary Earps – 2022, 2023

FIFPRO

The following players have won FIFPRO awards while playing for Manchester United:

- FIFPRO Women's World 11
  - (United States) Tobin Heath – 2020
  - (England) Mary Earps – 2023, 2024
  - (England) Alessia Russo – 2023
  - (England) Ella Toone (2) – 2023, 2026

Women's Football Awards

The following players have won Women's Football Awards while playing for Manchester United:

- Player of the Year
  - (England) Alessia Russo – 2023
- Young Football Player of the Year
  - (England) Maya Le Tissier (2) – 2024, 2026

IFFHS World Team

The following players have been named to the IFFHS World Team while playing for Manchester United:

- (England) Mary Earps – 2023
- (Japan) Hinata Miyazawa – 2023

PFA WSL Fan's Player of the Year

The following players have been named to the PFA WSL Fan's Player of the Year while playing for Manchester United:

- (Spain) Ona Batlle – 2022–23

PFA Team of the Year

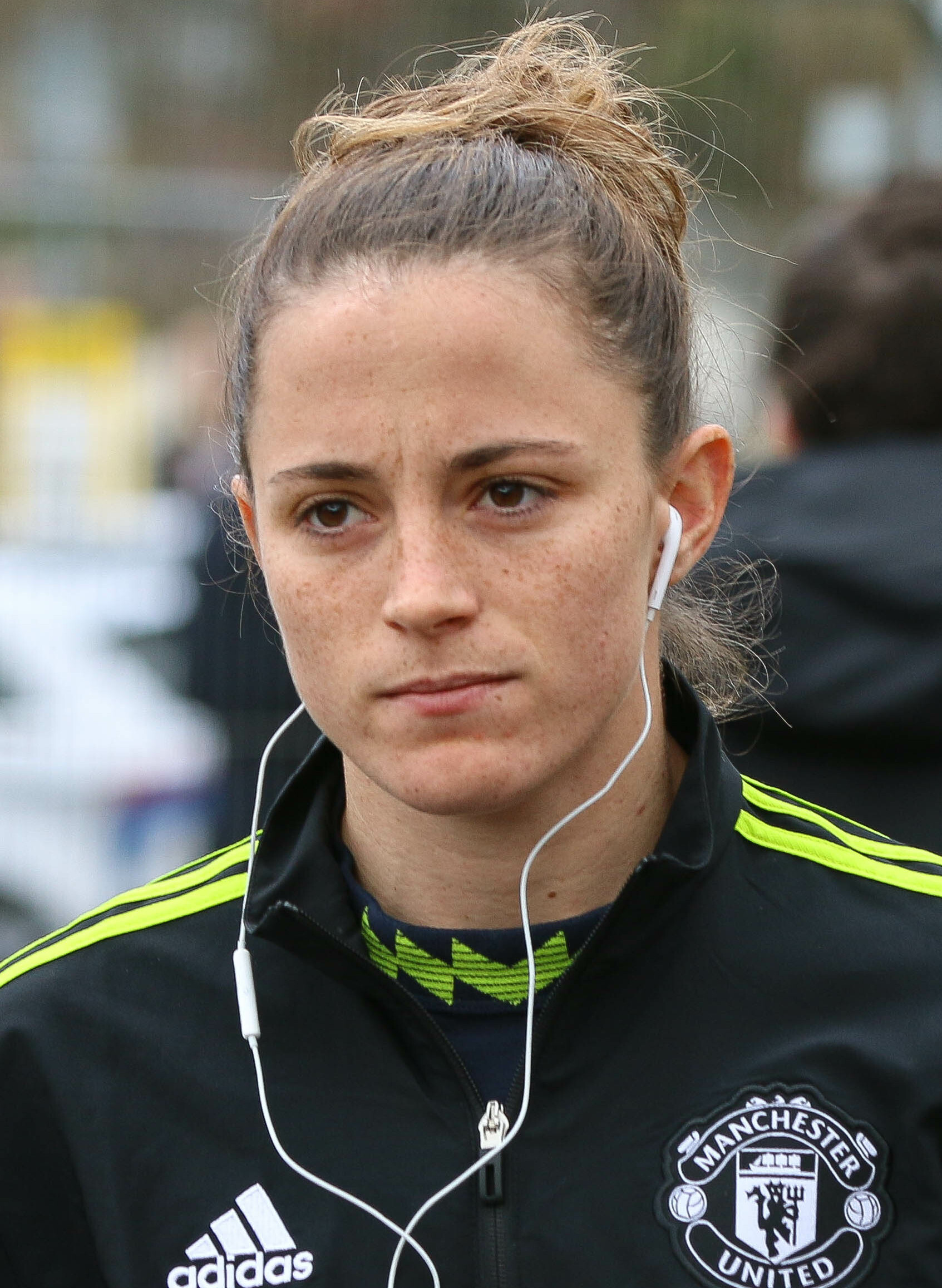
Ona Batlle was the first Manchester United player named to the WSL PFA Team of the Year.

The following players have been named to the PFA Team of the Year while playing for Manchester United:

- (Spain) Ona Batlle – 2021–22, 2022–23
- (England) Mary Earps – 2022–23
- (England) Maya Le Tissier – 2022–23, 2024–25
- (Canada) Jayde Riviere – 2024–25
- (United States) Phallon Tullis-Joyce – 2024–25
- (England) Jess Park – 2025–26

Women's Super League

The following players have won the Women's Super League awards while playing for Manchester United:

- Women's Super League Golden Glove
  - (England) Mary Earps – 2022–23
  - (United States) Phallon Tullis-Joyce – 2024–25
- WSL Champion of Change
  - (United States) Phallon Tullis-Joyce – 2025–26
- WSL Team of the Season
  - (England) Maya Le Tissier – 2025–26
  - (England) Jess Park – 2025–26

British Honours

The following players were awarded British honours while playing for Manchester United:

- Member of the Order of the British Empire (MBE)
  - (England) Mary Earps – 2024
  - (England) Ella Toone – 2026

BBC Sports Awards

The following players were awarded BBC Sports Awards while playing for Manchester United:

- BBC Sports Personality of the Year Award
  - (England) Mary Earps – 2023

=== Internationals ===
==== Caps ====
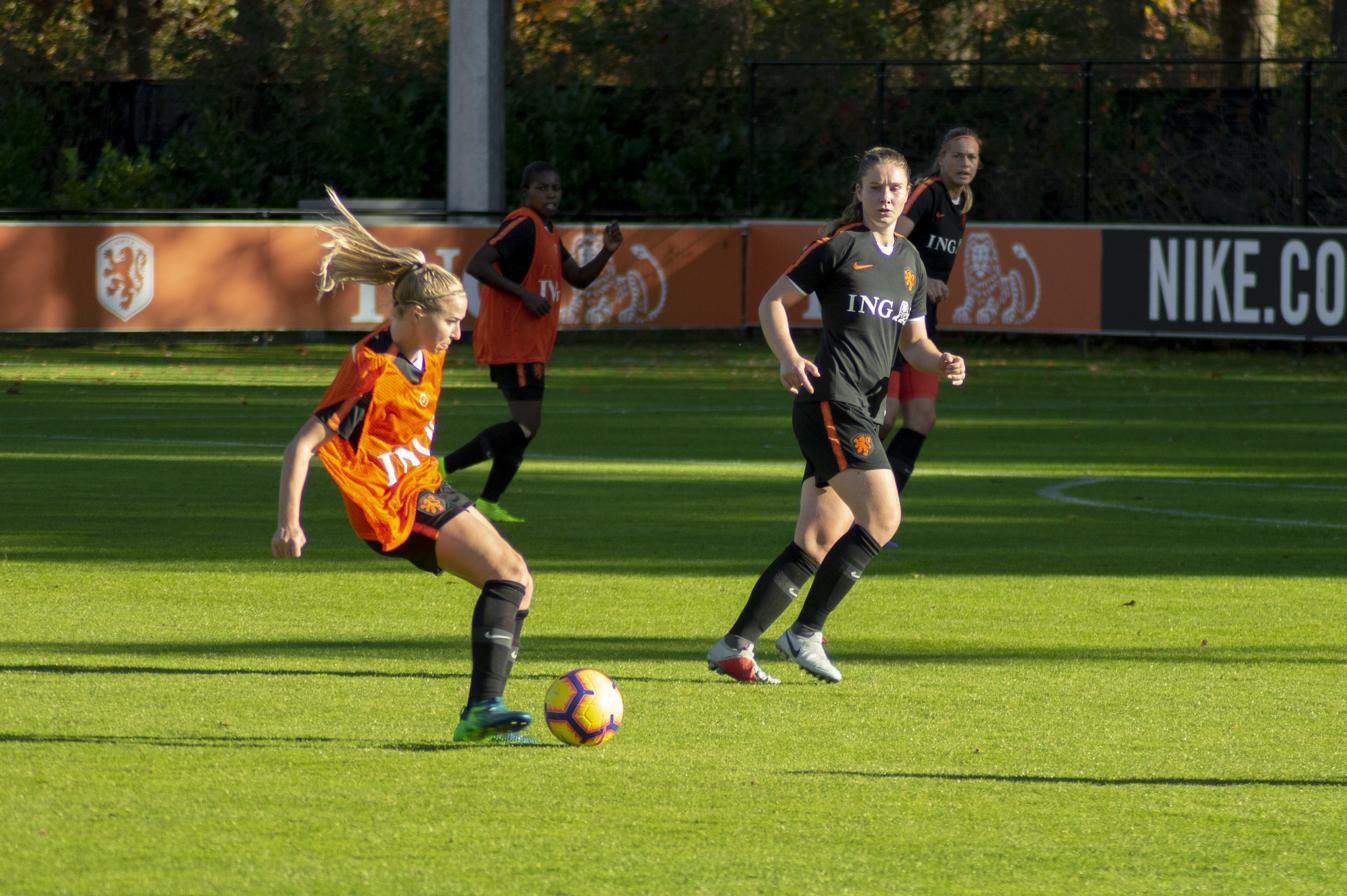
Jackie Groenen (left) became the first non-British player to both play for Manchester United and earn an international cap.

- First international: Lizzie Arnot for Scotland against Switzerland (30 August 2018)
  - United's first England international was Alex Greenwood who played against Wales one day after Arnot played for Scotland as a Manchester United player (31 August 2018)
  - United's first Great Britain international was Ella Toone who played against Chile during the 2020 Summer Olympics on 21 July 2021
  - United's first non-British international was Jackie Groenen who became a Manchester United player on 1 July 2019 while representing Netherlands at the 2019 FIFA Women's World Cup although she did not make her United debut until the season opener on 7 September 2019
- Most international caps (total): 181 – Tobin Heath – United States (1 while with the club)
- Most international caps as a United player: 69 – Ella Toone – England (69 total caps)

==== Honours ====
UEFA–CONMEBOL Finalissima

The following players have won the Women's Finalissima while playing for Manchester United:

- (England) Mary Earps – 2023
- (England) Maya Le Tissier – 2023
- (England) Alessia Russo – 2023
- (England) Ella Toone – 2023

UEFA European Championship

The following players have won the UEFA Women's Championship while playing for Manchester United:

- (England) Mary Earps – 2022
- (England) Alessia Russo – 2022
- (England) Ella Toone – 2022, 2025
- (England) Grace Clinton – 2025
- (England) Maya Le Tissier – 2025

UEFA Women's Nations League

The following players have won the UEFA Women's Nations League while playing for Manchester United:

- (Spain) Lucía García – 2023–24

AFC Women's Asian Cup

The following players have won the AFC Women's Asian Cup while playing for Manchester United:

- (Japan) Hinata Miyazawa – 2026

==== Individual awards ====
FIFA Women's World Cup

The following players have won FIFA Women's World Cup awards while playing for Manchester United:

- FIFA Women's World Cup Golden Glove
  - (England) Mary Earps – 2023

=== Transfers ===
==== Highest transfer fees paid ====
Manchester United's record signing is Ellen Wangerheim, who signed for the club from Hammarby for £560,000 (€645,000) in January 2026. The fee was reportedly the eleventh-largest to be paid at the time.

	Player	From	Fee	Date
1	(Sweden) Ellen Wangerheim	(Sweden) Hammarby	£560,000 (Note: Reported as 7 million Swedish krona)	January 2026
2	(Sweden) Monica Jusu Bah	(Sweden) Häcken	£400,000	August 2026
3	(Mexico) Rebeca Bernal	(United States) Washington Spirit	£300,000	August 2026
4	(Brazil) Geyse	(Spain) Barcelona	£256,000	August 2023
5	(Sweden) Anna Sandberg	(Sweden) BK Häcken	£180,000	August 2024
6	(England) Gabby George	(England) Everton	£150,000	September 2023
7	(United States) Phallon Tullis-Joyce	(United States) OL Reign	£129,000	September 2023
8	(Norway) Celin Bizet	(England) Tottenham Hotspur	£60,000	September 2024
9	(England) Maya Le Tissier	(England) Brighton & Hove Albion	£55,000	July 2022

==== Highest transfer fees received ====
Manchester United's record sale is Melvine Malard, who signed for Chelsea for £850,000 in July 2026.

	Player	From	Fee	Date
1	(France) Melvine Malard	(England) Chelsea	£850,000	July 2026
2	(England) Lauren James	(England) Chelsea	£200,000	July 2021
3	(Netherlands) Jackie Groenen	(France) Paris Saint-Germain	£130,000	September 2022
4	(England) Alex Greenwood	(France) Lyon	£50,000	August 2019

== Managerial records ==
- First full-time manager: Casey Stoney – Stoney was named manager in June 2018. It was the former England international's first managerial role. She had previously worked as a member of Phil Neville's England backroom staff.
- Longest-serving manager: Marc Skinner – 5 years, 5 days (166 matches) (29 July 2021 to 3 August 2026)

List of Manchester United W.F.C. managers
Image	Name	Nationality	From	To	P	W	D	L	GF	GA	Win% (Note: Win% is rounded to two decimal places)	Honours	Notes
	Casey Stoney	England	8 June 2018	16 May 2021	77	52	6	19	213	60	67.53	1 Women's Championship title	
	Marc Skinner	England	29 July 2021	3 August 2026	166	101	30	35	351	164	60.84	1 FA Cup title	
	Eva Olid	Spain	5 August 2026	present	16	11	3	2	39	18	68.75		

== Team records ==
=== Matches ===
- First competitive match: Liverpool 0–1 Manchester United, League Cup, 19 August 2018
- First League Cup match: Liverpool 0–1 Manchester United, League Cup, 19 August 2018
- First Home match (at Leigh Sports Village): Manchester United 0–2 Reading, League Cup, 25 August 2018
- First League match: Aston Villa 0–12 Manchester United, Women's Championship, 9 September 2018
- First FA Cup match: Brighton & Hove Albion 0–2 Manchester United, fourth round, 3 February 2019
- First match at Old Trafford: Manchester United 2–0 West Ham United, Women's Super League, 27 March 2021
- First European match: Manchester United 1–1 Paris Saint-Germain, Champions League second qualifying round, first leg, 10 October 2023

==== Record wins ====
- Record win: 12–0 vs Aston Villa, Women's Championship, 9 September 2018
- Record League win: 12–0 vs Aston Villa, Women's Championship, 9 September 2018
- Record FA Cup win: 7–0 vs West Bromwich Albion, FA Cup fourth round, 11 January 2024
- Record League Cup win: 11–1 vs Leicester City, League Cup Group Stage, 21 November 2019
- Record UEFA Champions League win: 4–0 vs. PSV Eindhoven, UEFA Champions League second qualifying round, 27 August 2025
- Record home win: 11–1 vs Leicester City, League Cup Group Stage, 21 November 2019
- Record away win: 12–0 vs Aston Villa, Women's Championship, 9 September 2018

==== Record defeats ====
- Record defeat: 0–6 vs Chelsea, Women's Super League, 18 May 2024
- Record League defeat: 0–6 vs Chelsea, Women's Super League, 18 May 2024
- Record FA Cup defeat:

1–4 vs Manchester City, FA Cup fifth round, 27 February 2022
0–3 vs Chelsea, FA Cup final, 18 May 2025

- Record League Cup defeat:

0–2 vs Reading, League Cup Group Stage, 25 August 2018
1–3 vs Liverpool, League Cup Group Stage, 7 October 2020
1–3 vs Chelsea, League Cup Semi-final, 2 February 2022
0–2 vs Chelsea, League Cup final, 15 March 2026

- Record UEFA Champions League defeat:

2–5 vs VfL Wolfsburg, UEFA Champions League league phase, 19 November 2025
0–3 vs Lyon, UEFA Champions League league phase, 10 December 2025

- Record home defeat: 0–6 vs Chelsea, Women's Super League, 18 May 2024
- Record away defeat:

0–3 vs Manchester City, Women's Super League, 12 February 2021
0–3 vs Manchester City, Women's Super League, 15 November 2025
2–5 vs VfL Wolfsburg, UEFA Champions League league phase, 19 November 2025

==== Streaks ====
- Longest unbeaten run (competitive matches): 14 matches, 19 September 2026 to present
- Longest unbeaten run (League): 14 matches, 19 January 2020 to 17 January 2021
- Longest winning streak (competitive matches): 8 matches, 18 January 2026 to 22 February 2026
- Longest winning streak (League): 10 matches, 6 January 2019 to 7 September 2019
- Longest losing streak (competitive matches): 3 matches

25 March 2026 to 26 April 2026
16 May 2026 to 19 September 2026

- Longest losing streak (League): 3 matches, 16 May 2026 to 19 September 2026
- Longest drawing streak (competitive matches): 4 matches, 9 October 2021 to 17 November 2021
- Longest drawing streak (League): 3 matches

9 October 2021 to 21 November 2021
19 October 2024 to 17 November 2024

- Longest streak without a win (competitive matches): 9 matches, 25 March 2026 to 23 September 2026
- Longest streak without a win (League): 7 matches, 29 March 2026 to 27 September 2026
- Longest scoring run (competitive matches): 32 matches, 21 May 2023 to 5 May 2024
- Longest scoring run (League): 27 matches, 25 March 2023 to 5 May 2024
- Longest non-scoring run (competitive matches): 2 matches

7 September 2019 to 28 September 2019
7 February 2021 to 7 March 2021
19 April 2025 to 4 May 2025
15 March 2026 to 21 March 2026

- Longest non-scoring run (League): 2 matches

7 September 2019 to 28 September 2019
7 February 2021 to 7 March 2021
5 May 2024 to 21 September 2024
19 April 2025 to 4 May 2025
8 November 2025 to 7 December 2025
28 March 2026 to 2 May 2026

- Longest streak without conceding a goal (competitive matches): 7 matches, 12 December 2021 to 2 February 2022
- Longest streak without conceding a goal (League): 5 matches

9 September 2018 to 4 November 2018
17 September 2022 to 6 November 2022

- Longest streak without a clean sheet (competitive matches): 8 matches

2 November 2025 to 17 December 2025
2 May 2026 to 3 October 2026

- Longest streak without a clean sheet (League): 7 matches, 4 October 2025 to 10 January 2026

==== Wins/draws/losses in a season ====
- Most wins in a league season: 18

2018–19
2022–23

- Most draws in a league season: 7 – 2025–26
- Most defeats in a league season: 7 – 2023–24
- Fewest wins in a league season: 7 – 2019–20 (Note: The 2019–20 season was curtailed after 14 of 22 intended games as a result of the COVID-19 pandemic. Fewest league wins in a completed season is 10 during 2023–24.)
- Fewest draws in a league season: 1 – 2018–19
- Fewest defeats in a league season: 1 – 2018–19

=== Goals ===
- Most League goals scored in a season: 98 – 2018–19
- Fewest League goals scored in a season: 24 – 2019–20 (Note: The 2019–20 season was curtailed after 14 of 22 intended games as a result of the COVID-19 pandemic. Fewest league goals in a completed season is 38 during 2025–26.)
- Most League goals conceded in a season: 32 – 2023–24
- Fewest League goals conceded in a season: 7 – 2018–19

=== Points ===
- Most points in a season: 56 – 2022–23
- Fewest points in a season: 23 – 2019–20 (Note: The 2019–20 season was curtailed after 14 of 22 intended games as a result of the COVID-19 pandemic. Fewest points in a completed season is 35 during 2023–24.)

=== Record attendance ===
- Highest home attendance (at Old Trafford): 43,615 vs Manchester City, Women's Super League, 19 November 2023
- Highest home attendance (at Leigh Sports Village): 8,665 vs Arsenal, Women's Super League, 21 September 2025
- Highest away attendance: 44,259 vs Manchester City, Women's Super League, 11 December 2022
- Highest neutral attendance: 77,390 vs Chelsea, 2023 Women's FA Cup final, Wembley Stadium, 14 May 2023
- Lowest home attendance: 686 vs Durham, League Cup group stage, 5 December 2018

== Season-by-season performance ==
=== Key ===
- P = Matches played
- W = Matches won
- D = Matches drawn
- L = Matches lost
- GF = Goals for
- GA = Goals against
- Pts = Points
- Pos = Final position
- QR1 = First qualifying round
- QR2 = Second qualifying round
- GS = Group stage
- R4 = Round 4
- R5 = Round 5
- QF = Quarter-finals
- SF = Semi-finals
- RU = Runners-up
- W = Winners

Champions	Runners-up	Promoted	Relegated

=== Season summary ===
Results of league and cup competitions by season
Season	League									FA Cup	League Cup	Champions League	Top goalscorer (Note: Goals in all competitions (FA Women's Championship or Women's Super League, Women's FA Cup, FA Women's League Cup and UEFA Women's Champions League are counted.))	
Season	Division	P	W	D	L	GF	GA	Pts	Pos	FA Cup	League Cup	Champions League	Name	Goals
2018–19	Championship	20	18	1	1	98	7	55	1st	QF	SF	N/A	Jessica Sigsworth	18
2019–20	WSL	14	7	2	5	24	12	23	4th	R4	SF	N/A	Lauren James	9
2020–21	WSL	22	15	2	5	44	20	47	4th	R5	GS	Did not qualify	Ella Toone	10
2021–22	WSL	22	12	6	4	45	22	42	4th	R5	SF	Did not qualify	Alessia Russo	11
2022–23	WSL	22	18	2	2	56	12	56	2nd	RU	GS	Did not qualify	Alessia Russo	13
2023–24	WSL	22	10	5	7	42	32	35	5th	W	GS	QR2	Nikita Parris	16
2024–25	WSL	22	13	5	4	41	16	44	3rd	RU	QF	Did not qualify	Elisabeth Terland	12
2025–26	WSL	22	11	7	4	38	22	40	4th	R5	RU	QF	Elisabeth Terland	15

== Record by opponent ==
=== All-time league record ===
Manchester United W.F.C. league record by opponent
Club	P	W	D	L	P	W	D	L	P	W	D	L	GF	GA	Win%
Club	Home				Away				Total						Win%
Arsenal	7	2	3	2	7	1	3	3	14	3	6	5	14	19	21.43
Aston Villa	7	5	1	1	8	7	1	0	15	12	2	1	48	6	80.00
Birmingham City	2	2	0	0	3	3	0	0	5	5	0	0	16	3	100.00
Brighton & Hove Albion	7	6	1	0	7	3	3	1	14	9	4	1	31	8	64.29
Bristol City	3	2	0	1	2	2	0	0	5	4	0	1	11	2	80.00
Charlton Athletic	1	1	0	0	2	2	0	0	3	3	0	0	8	2	100.00
Chelsea	7	0	2	5	7	0	0	7	14	0	2	12	8	36	0.00
Crystal Palace	3	3	0	0	2	2	0	0	5	5	0	0	18	1	100.00
Durham	1	0	1	0	1	0	0	1	2	0	1	1	1	3	0.00
Everton	7	6	1	0	8	6	2	0	15	12	3	0	35	8	80.00
Leicester City	6	5	1	0	6	6	0	0	12	11	1	0	38	4	91.67
Lewes	1	1	0	0	1	1	0	0	2	2	0	0	7	0	100.00
Liverpool	6	5	0	1	4	2	0	2	10	7	0	3	21	7	70.00
London Bees	1	1	0	0	1	1	0	0	2	2	0	0	14	0	100.00
London City Lionesses	1	1	0	0	2	1	0	1	3	2	0	1	8	4	66.67
Manchester City	7	1	4	2	7	1	1	5	14	2	5	7	16	28	14.29
Millwall Lionesses	1	1	0	0	1	1	0	0	2	2	0	0	13	0	100.00
Reading	4	3	0	1	4	3	1	0	8	6	1	1	15	5	75.00
Sheffield United	1	1	0	0	1	1	0	0	2	2	0	0	7	0	100.00
Tottenham Hotspur	8	6	2	0	8	6	2	0	16	12	4	0	42	10	75.00
West Ham United	7	7	0	0	7	2	4	1	14	9	4	1	31	9	64.29

=== Overall league record ===
Manchester United W.F.C. overall league record by competition
Competition	P	W	D	L	P	W	D	L	P	W	D	L	GF	GA	Win%
Competition	Home				Away				Total						Win%
Women's Super League (Tier-One)	78	50	15	13	79	42	17	20	157	92	32	33	304	148	58.60
Women's Championship (Tier-Two)	10	9	1	0	10	9	0	1	20	18	1	1	98	7	90.00
Total	88	59	16	13	89	52	17	21	177	110	33	34	402	155	62.15

=== All-time cup record ===
Manchester United W.F.C. cup record by opponent
Club	P	W	D	L	P	W	D	L	P	W	D	L	GF	GA	Win%
Club	FA Cup				League Cup				Total						Win%
Arsenal	0	0	0	0	3	2	0	1	3	2	0	1	3	2	66.67
Aston Villa	0	0	0	0	1	0	1	0	1	0	1	0	1	1	0.00
Birmingham City	0	0	0	0	1	1	0	0	1	1	0	0	3	1	100.00
Bridgwater United	1	1	0	0	0	0	0	0	1	1	0	0	2	0	100.00
Brighton & Hove Albion	3	3	0	0	1	1	0	0	4	4	0	0	11	3	100.00
Burnley	2	2	0	0	1	1	0	0	3	3	0	0	14	0	100.00
Chelsea	4	1	0	3	3	0	0	3	7	1	0	6	4	13	14.29
Durham	1	1	0	0	4	2	2	0	5	3	2	0	15	5	60.00
Everton	0	0	0	0	8	7	0	1	8	7	0	1	23	4	87.50
Leicester City	1	0	0	1	3	2	1	0	4	2	1	1	18	7	50.00
Lewes	1	1	0	0	0	0	0	0	1	1	0	0	3	1	100.00
Liverpool	0	0	0	0	5	4	0	1	5	4	0	1	10	6	80.00
London Bees	1	1	0	0	0	0	0	0	1	1	0	0	3	0	100.00
Manchester City	3	1	0	2	5	2	1	2	8	3	1	4	11	12	37.50
Newcastle United	1	1	0	0	1	1	0	0	2	2	0	0	10	3	100.00
Reading	1	0	0	1	1	0	0	1	2	0	0	2	2	5	0.00
Sheffield United	0	0	0	0	2	2	0	0	2	2	0	0	14	1	100.00
Southampton	1	1	0	0	0	0	0	0	1	1	0	0	3	1	100.00
Sunderland	2	2	0	0	0	0	0	0	2	2	0	0	5	2	100.00
Tottenham Hotspur	1	1	0	0	1	1	0	0	2	2	0	0	6	1	100.00
West Ham United	0	0	0	0	1	1	0	0	1	1	0	0	2	0	100.00
West Bromwich Albion	1	1	0	0	0	0	0	0	1	1	0	0	7	0	100.00
Wolverhampton Wanderers	1	1	0	0	0	0	0	0	1	1	0	0	6	0	100.00

=== Overall cup record ===
Manchester United W.F.C. overall cup record by competition
Competition	P	W	D	L	P	W	D	L	P	W	D	L	P	W	D	L	GF	GA	Win%
Competition	Home				Away				Neutral				Total						Win%
FA Cup	11	8	0	3	11	9	0	2	3	1	0	2	25	18	0	7	75	26	72.00
League Cup	21	16	2	3	19	11	3	5	1	0	0	1	41	27	5	9	101	42	65.85
Total	32	24	2	6	30	20	3	7	4	1	0	3	66	45	5	16	176	68	68.18

=== All-time European record ===
==== By country ====
Manchester United W.F.C. overall European record by opposition nationality
Country	P	W	D	L	P	W	D	L	P	W	D	L	P	W	D	L	GF	GA	Win%
Country	Home				Away				Neutral				Total						Win%
France	3	1	1	1	1	0	0	1	0	0	0	0	4	1	1	2	4	8	25.00
Germany	1	0	0	1	2	0	0	2	0	0	0	0	3	0	0	3	5	10	0.00
Italy	0	0	0	0	1	1	0	0	0	0	0	0	1	1	0	0	1	0	100.00
Netherlands	0	0	0	0	0	0	0	0	1	1	0	0	1	1	0	0	4	0	100.00
Norway	2	2	0	0	1	0	0	1	0	0	0	0	3	2	0	1	4	1	66.67
Spain	1	1	0	0	2	2	0	0	0	0	0	0	3	3	0	0	6	0	100.00
Sweden	0	0	0	0	1	1	0	0	0	0	0	0	1	1	0	0	1	0	100.00

==== By club ====
Manchester United W.F.C. overall European record by opponent
Club	P	W	D	L	P	W	D	L	P	W	D	L	P	W	D	L	GF	GA	Win%
Club	Home				Away				Neutral				Total						Win%
(Spain) Atlético Madrid	1	1	0	0	2	2	0	0	0	0	0	0	3	3	0	0	6	0	100.00
(Germany) Bayern Munich	1	0	0	1	1	0	0	1	0	0	0	0	2	0	0	2	3	5	0.00
(Norway) Brann	1	1	0	0	1	0	0	1	0	0	0	0	2	1	0	1	3	1	50.00
(Sweden) Hammarby IF	0	0	0	0	1	1	0	0	0	0	0	0	1	1	0	0	1	0	100.00
(Italy) Juventus	0	0	0	0	1	1	0	0	0	0	0	0	1	1	0	0	1	0	100.00
(France) Lyon	1	0	0	1	0	0	0	0	0	0	0	0	1	0	0	1	0	3	0.00
(France) Paris Saint-Germain	2	1	1	0	1	0	0	1	0	0	0	0	3	1	1	1	4	5	33.33
(Netherlands) PSV Eindhoven	0	0	0	0	0	0	0	0	1	1	0	0	1	1	0	0	4	0	100.00
(Norway) Vålerenga	1	1	0	0	0	0	0	0	0	0	0	0	1	1	0	0	1	0	100.00
(Germany) VfL Wolfsburg	0	0	0	0	1	0	0	1	0	0	0	0	1	0	0	1	2	5	0.00

=== Overall European record ===
Manchester United W.F.C. overall European record by competition
Competition	P	W	D	L	P	W	D	L	P	W	D	L	P	W	D	L	GF	GA	Win%
Competition	Home				Away				Neutral				Total						Win%
Champions League	7	4	1	2	8	4	0	4	1	1	0	0	16	9	1	6	25	19	56.25
Total	7	4	1	2	8	4	0	4	1	1	0	0	16	9	1	6	25	19	56.25

== See also ==
- List of Manchester United F.C. records and statistics
