= 2022–23 Manchester United W.F.C. season =

Manchester United Women
2022–23 season
- Co-chairmen: Joel and Avram Glazer
- Head coach: Marc Skinner
- Stadium: Leigh Sports Village; Old Trafford (selected matches)
- Women's Super League: 2nd
- FA Cup: Runners-up
- League Cup: Group stage
- Top goalscorer: League: Leah Galton and Alessia Russo (10 goals); All: Alessia Russo (13 goals)
- Highest home attendance: 30,196 (v. Aston Villa, 3 December 2022)
- Lowest home attendance: League: 3,623 (v. Leicester City, 5 March 2023); All: 1,273 (v. Sheffield United, 18 December 2022, League Cup)
- Average home league attendance: 10,177
| Home colours | Away colours | Third colours |
- All statistics correct as of 27 May 2023.

The 2022–23 season was Manchester United Women's fifth season since they were founded and their fourth in the Women's Super League, the professional top-flight women's league in England. The club also competed in the FA Cup and League Cup.

The season marked the first time Manchester United Women reached a major cup final. The team debuted at Wembley Stadium in the 2023 Women's FA Cup final on 14 May 2023. United lost 1–0 to Chelsea who won their third consecutive FA Cup title. Manchester United also achieved their best league position to date, finishing runner-up to Chelsea and qualifying for the UEFA Women's Champions League for the first time in the process.

For the third successive season, Manchester United Women scheduled a game at Old Trafford. The game was played on 3 December 2022 against Aston Villa and set a new club attendance record as 30,196 watched a 5–0 United victory. The team played a second game in the same season at Old Trafford for the first time, against West Ham United on 25 March 2023 as part of The FA's Women's Football Weekend initiative. Manchester United Women maintained a 100% winning record at Old Trafford, beating West Ham United 4–0.

== Pre-season and friendlies ==
Having had an earlier friendly against Championship side Blackburn Rovers cancelled, Manchester United began pre-season with a behind-closed-doors friendly against fellow WSL club Liverpool at Carrington on 13 August. Leah Galton scored the only goal of a 1–0 win. United then travelled to France to take part in the invitational Women's French Cup held in Toulouse. They were drawn against Paris Saint-Germain in the semi-finals, winning 1–0 thanks to a Katie Zelem goal to set up a final against Bayern Munich who beat Barcelona on the other side of the draw. Bayern won 3–0. On August 28, United returned to Carrington to end pre-season with a 1–0 win over WSL side Everton. All but the match against Liverpool were broadcast live on MUTV. On the final weekend before the start of the season, United scheduled a game against Championship side Birmingham City. It was set to feature a depleted squad during the international break but it was later called off. In January, the team scheduled a mid-season week-long winter training camp in Malta including a friendly match against Birkirkara. The game was watched in front of 1,053 spectators, setting a new record attendance for a women's football match in Malta, beating the previous record of 764 set in 2019 by the national team.

| Date | Opponents | H / A | Result F–A | Scorers | Attendance |
|---|---|---|---|---|---|
| 10 August 2022 | Blackburn Rovers | H | Cancelled | | |
| 13 August 2022 | Liverpool | H | 1–0 | Galton | |
| 16 August 2022 | Paris Saint-Germain | N | 1–0 | Zelem 65' | |
| 19 August 2022 | Bayern Munich | N | 0–3 | | |
| 28 August 2022 | Everton | H | 1–0 | García 80' | |
| 4 September 2022 | Birmingham City | H | Cancelled | | |
| 6 January 2023 | Birkirkara | N | 10–0 | Bøe Risa (2), Russo (2), García, Clinton, Moore, Parris, Williams, Thomas | 1,053 |

== Women's Super League ==
=== Matches ===
| Date | Opponents | H / A | Result F–A | Scorers | Attendance | League position |
|---|---|---|---|---|---|---|
| 10 September 2022 | Tottenham Hotspur | A | Postponed due to the death of Elizabeth II | | | |
| 17 September 2022 | Reading | H | 4–0 | Le Tissier (2) 4', 25', Zelem 14' (pen.), Russo 35' | 7,315 | 2nd |
| 25 September 2022 | West Ham United | A | 2–0 | García 50', Blundell 55' | 2,104 | 2nd |
| 16 October 2022 | Brighton & Hove Albion | H | 4–0 | Toone (2) 14', 26', Galton 40', Leon 78' | 3,685 | 1st |
| 23 October 2022 | Leicester City | A | 1–0 | Parris 34' | 4,007 | 2nd |
| 30 October 2022 | Everton | A | 3–0 | Parris 13', Galton 55', Ladd 68' | 1,752 | 1st |
| 6 November 2022 | Chelsea | H | 1–3 | Russo 71' | 6,186 | 3rd |
| 19 November 2022 | Arsenal | A | 3–2 | Toone 39', Turner 85', Russo 90+1' | 40,064 | 2nd |
| 3 December 2022 | Aston Villa | H | 5–0 | Zelem 13', Galton 28', Russo 51', Batlle 76', Williams 90+3' | 30,196 | 2nd |
| 11 December 2022 | Manchester City | A | 1–1 | Galton 27' | 44,259 | 3rd |
| 15 January 2023 | Liverpool | H | 6–0 | García 6', Russo 24', Ladd 41', Koivisto 63' (o.g.), Thomas 72', Williams 84' | 7,662 | 2nd |
| 22 January 2023 | Reading | A | 1–0 | Williams 87' | 5,108 | 1st |
| 5 February 2023 | Everton | H | 0–0 | | 5,040 | 2nd |
| 12 February 2023 | Tottenham Hotspur | A | 2–1 | Galton 67', Bartrip 76' (o.g.) | 21,940 | 1st |
| 5 March 2023 | Leicester City | H | 5–1 | Russo (3) 15', 36', 53', Galton 64', García 84' | 3,623 | 1st |
| 12 March 2023 | Chelsea | A | 0–1 | | 3,277 | 2nd |
| 25 March 2023 | West Ham United | H | 4–0 | Zelem 52' (pen.), García (2) 65', 90+1', Ladd 84' | 27,919 | 1st |
| 1 April 2023 | Brighton & Hove Albion | A | 4–0 | Galton (2) 12', 66', Williams 86', García 87' | 4,375 | 1st |
| 19 April 2023 (Note: This match, originally scheduled for 22 April 2023, was rescheduled due to Arsenal's progression to the semi-finals of the UEFA Women's Champions League.) | Arsenal | H | 1–0 | Russo 45+6' | 6,658 | 1st |
| 28 April 2023 | Aston Villa | A | 3–2 | Galton 15', Parris 62', Turner 90+3' | 4,176 | 1st |
| 7 May 2023 | Tottenham Hotspur | H | 3–0 | Galton 32', Russo 35', Parris 53' | 5,796 | 1st |
| 21 May 2023 | Manchester City | H | 2–1 | Ladd 2', García 90+1' | 7,864 | 2nd |
| 27 May 2023 | Liverpool | A | 1–0 | García 72' | 5,778 | 2nd |

=== Table ===
| Pos | Team | Pld | W | D | L | GF | GA | GD | Pts | Qualification or relegation |
|---|---|---|---|---|---|---|---|---|---|---|
| 1 | Chelsea (C) | 22 | 19 | 1 | 2 | 66 | 15 | +51 | 58 | Qualification for the Champions League group stage (Note: England's UEFA association coefficient meant, as the 4th ranked association, the WSL champions qualified for the second round. However, as 2022–23 UEFA Women's Champions League winners Barcelona had already qualified for the group stage as 2022–23 Liga F champions, the title holders' berth to the group stage was redistributed to Chelsea.) |
| 2 | Manchester United | 22 | 18 | 2 | 2 | 56 | 12 | +44 | 56 | Qualification for the Champions League second round |
| 3 | Arsenal | 22 | 15 | 2 | 5 | 49 | 16 | +33 | 47 | Qualification for the Champions League first round |
| 4 | Manchester City | 22 | 15 | 2 | 5 | 50 | 25 | +25 | 47 | |
| 5 | Aston Villa | 22 | 11 | 4 | 7 | 47 | 37 | +10 | 37 | |

Source: Women's Super League
Rules for classification: 1) Points; 2) Goal difference; 3) Number of goals scored.
(C) Champions

== Women's FA Cup ==
As a member of the first tier, United entered the FA Cup in the fourth round proper.

| Date | Round | Opponents | H / A | Result F–A | Scorers | Attendance |
|---|---|---|---|---|---|---|
| 29 January 2023 | Round 4 | Sunderland | A | 2–1 | Parris (2) 39', 69' | 1,810 |
| 26 February 2023 | Round 5 | Durham | H | 5–0 | Bøe Risa 42', Galton 53', Blundell 67', Russo 78', Parris 88' | 1,735 |
| 19 March 2023 | Quarter-final | Lewes | A | 3–1 | Russo 8', Bøe Risa 68', Parris 89' | 2,801 |
| 15 April 2023 | Semi-final | Brighton & Hove Albion | H | 3–2 | Galton 46', Russo 71', Williams 89' | 4,096 |
| 14 May 2023 | Final | Chelsea | N | 0–1 | | 77,390 |

== FA Women's League Cup ==
=== Group stage ===
As a team not qualified for the group stage of the Champions League, Manchester United entered the League Cup at the group stage.

| Date | Opponents | H / A | Result F–A | Scorers | Attendance | Group position |
|---|---|---|---|---|---|---|
| 1 October 2022 | Aston Villa | A | 1–1 (3–4 p) | Parris 16' | 2,109 | 2nd |
| 26 October 2022 | Durham | A | 2–2 (1–3 p) | Moore 22', Bøe Risa 66' | 1,695 | 3rd |
| 7 December 2022 | Everton | H | 4–2 | Bøe Risa (2) 1', 20', Williams 12', Moore 27' | 1,519 | 2nd |
| 18 December 2022 | Sheffield United | H | 4–0 | Leon (2) 12', 44', Wilson 51' (o.g.), Thomas 63' | 1,273 | 2nd |

Group A

| Pos | Team | Pld | W | WPEN | LPEN | L | GF | GA | GD | Pts | Qualification | AST | MUN | DUR | EVE | SHU |
|---|---|---|---|---|---|---|---|---|---|---|---|---|---|---|---|---|
| 1 | Aston Villa | 4 | 2 | 1 | 1 | 0 | 5 | 3 | +2 | 9 | Advanced to knock-out stage | — | 1–1 | 1–0 | – | – |
| 2 | Manchester United | 4 | 2 | 0 | 2 | 0 | 11 | 5 | +6 | 8 | Possible knock-out stage based on ranking | – | — | – | 4–2 | 4–0 |
| 3 | Durham | 4 | 1 | 2 | 0 | 1 | 6 | 6 | 0 | 7 | | – | 2–2 | — | – | 3–3 |
| 4 | Everton | 4 | 1 | 1 | 0 | 2 | 6 | 6 | 0 | 5 | | 1–1 | – | 0–1 | — | – |
| 5 | Sheffield United | 4 | 0 | 0 | 1 | 3 | 4 | 12 | −8 | 1 | | 1–2 | – | – | 3–0 | — |

Rules for classification: 1) Points; 2) Goal difference; 3) Number of goals scored; 4) Number of wins; 5) Head-to-head record

Ranking of second-placed teams

| Pos | Grp | Team | Pld | W | WPEN | LPEN | L | GF | GA | GD | Pts | PPG | Qualification |
|---|---|---|---|---|---|---|---|---|---|---|---|---|---|
| 1 | B | Liverpool | 4 | 3 | 0 | 0 | 1 | 6 | 2 | +4 | 9 | 2.25 | Advanced to knock-out stage |
| 2 | A | Manchester United | 4 | 2 | 0 | 2 | 0 | 11 | 5 | +6 | 8 | 2.00 | |
| 3 | E | Reading | 3 | 2 | 0 | 0 | 1 | 8 | 2 | +6 | 6 | 2.00 | |
| 4 | C | Brighton & Hove Albion | 3 | 2 | 0 | 0 | 1 | 6 | 2 | +4 | 6 | 2.00 | |
| 5 | D | Lewes | 3 | 2 | 0 | 0 | 1 | 6 | 2 | +4 | 6 | 2.00 | |

== Squad statistics ==
As of 27 May 2023
Numbers in brackets denote appearances as substitute.
Key to positions: GK – Goalkeeper; DF – Defender; MF – Midfielder; FW – Forward

| No. | Pos. | Name | League | | FA Cup | | League Cup | | Total | | Discipline | |
| No. | Pos. | Name | Apps | Goals | Apps | Goals | Apps | Goals | Apps | Goals | Yellow card | Red card |
|---|---|---|---|---|---|---|---|---|---|---|---|---|
| 1 | GK | (England) Emily Ramsey | 0 | 0 | 0 | 0 | 0 | 0 | 0 | 0 | 0 | 0 |
| 2 | DF | (Spain) Ona Batlle | 19 | 1 | 5 | 0 | 3 | 0 | 27 | 1 | 1 | 0 |
| 3 | DF | (Norway) Maria Thorisdottir | 3(2) | 0 | 1 | 0 | 4 | 0 | 8(2) | 0 | 0 | 0 |
| 4 | MF | (England) Jade Moore | 0(3) | 0 | 0 | 0 | 3 | 2 | 3(3) | 2 | 0 | 0 |
| 5 | DF | (Republic of Ireland) Aoife Mannion | 2(3) | 0 | 0(4) | 0 | 0 | 0 | 2(7) | 0 | 0 | 0 |
| 6 | DF | (England) Hannah Blundell | 22 | 1 | 4 | 1 | 0(3) | 0 | 26(3) | 2 | 3 | 0 |
| 7 | FW | (England) Ella Toone | 22 | 3 | 3(1) | 0 | 0(2) | 0 | 25(3) | 3 | 3 | 1 (Note: Toone was shown a red card during the WSL match against Tottenham Hotspur on 12 February 2023, but it was subsequently overturned following an appeal.) |
| 8 | MF | (Norway) Vilde Bøe Risa | 3(9) | 0 | 3 | 2 | 4 | 3 | 10(9) | 5 | 1 | 0 |
| 9 | FW | (Scotland) Martha Thomas | 1(19) | 1 | 3(2) | 0 | 4 | 1 | 8(21) | 2 | 0 | 0 |
| 10 | MF | (England) Katie Zelem (c) | 21 | 3 | 5 | 0 | 0(4) | 0 | 26(4) | 3 | 6 | 0 |
| 11 | FW | (England) Leah Galton | 20 | 10 | 3 | 2 | 0(1) | 0 | 23(1) | 12 | 0 | 0 |
| 12 | MF | (Wales) Hayley Ladd | 19(2) | 4 | 3(1) | 0 | 1(1) | 0 | 23(4) | 4 | 3 | 0 |
| 13 | FW | (Brazil) Ivana Fuso | 0 | 0 | 0 | 0 | 0 | 0 | 0 | 0 | 0 | 0 |
| 14 | DF | (Canada) Jayde Riviere | 0(1) | 0 | 0 | 0 | 0 | 0 | 0(1) | 0 | 0 | 0 |
| 15 | DF | (England) Maya Le Tissier | 22 | 2 | 5 | 0 | 2(2) | 0 | 29(2) | 2 | 3 | 0 |
| 16 | MF | (Norway) Lisa Naalsund | 0(1) | 0 | 1 | 0 | 0 | 0 | 1(1) | 0 | 0 | 0 |
| 17 | FW | (Spain) Lucía García | 8(12) | 8 | 3(2) | 0 | 2(1) | 0 | 13(15) | 8 | 1 | 0 |
| 18 | FW | (Scotland) Kirsty Hanson | 0 | 0 | 0 | 0 | 0 | 0 | 0 | 0 | 0 | 0 |
| 19 | FW | (Canada) Adriana Leon | 0(5) | 1 | 0(1) | 0 | 3 | 2 | 3(6) | 3 | 0 | 0 |
| 20 | DF | (France) Aïssatou Tounkara | 0(1) | 0 | 0 | 0 | 4 | 0 | 4(1) | 0 | 0 | 0 |
| 21 | DF | (England) Millie Turner | 20(2) | 2 | 5 | 0 | 3 | 0 | 28(2) | 2 | 3 | 0 |
| 22 | FW | (England) Nikita Parris | 17(4) | 4 | 2(2) | 4 | 1(1) | 1 | 20(7) | 9 | 1 | 0 |
| 23 | FW | (England) Alessia Russo | 19(1) | 10 | 3(1) | 3 | 0 | 0 | 22(2) | 13 | 1 | 0 |
| 24 | MF | (Wales) Carrie Jones | 0 | 0 | 0 | 0 | 0 | 0 | 0 | 0 | 0 | 0 |
| 25 | DF | (England) Tara Bourne | 0 | 0 | 0 | 0 | 0 | 0 | 0 | 0 | 0 | 0 |
| 26 | MF | (England) Grace Clinton | 0 | 0 | 0 | 0 | 0 | 0 | 0 | 0 | 0 | 0 |
| 27 | GK | (England) Mary Earps | 22 | 0 | 5 | 0 | 0 | 0 | 27 | 0 | 0 | 0 |
| 28 | FW | (England) Rachel Williams | 0(17) | 4 | 1(4) | 1 | 3 | 1 | 4(21) | 6 | 0 | 0 |
| 29 | MF | (France) Estelle Cascarino | 0(1) | 0 | 0(1) | 0 | 0 | 0 | 0(2) | 0 | 0 | 0 |
| 32 | GK | (England) Sophie Baggaley | 0 | 0 | 0 | 0 | 4 | 0 | 4 | 0 | 0 | 0 |
| 37 | MF | (England) Lucy Staniforth | 2(2) | 0 | 0 | 0 | 3 | 0 | 5(2) | 0 | 0 | 0 |
| 39 | GK | (Wales) Safia Middleton-Patel | 0 | 0 | 0 | 0 | 0 | 0 | 0 | 0 | 0 | 0 |
| 41 | FW | (England) Alyssa Aherne | 0 | 0 | 0 | 0 | 0(1) | 0 | 0(1) | 0 | 1 | 0 |
| 45 | DF | (England) Jessica Simpson | 0 | 0 | 0 | 0 | 0 | 0 | 0 | 0 | 0 | 0 |
| 46 | FW | (England) Keira Barry | 0 | 0 | 0 | 0 | 0(1) | 0 | 0(1) | 0 | 0 | 0 |
| Own goals | | | — | 2 | — | 1 | — | 1 | — | 4 | — | — |

== Transfers ==
=== In ===
| Date | Pos. | Name | From | Ref. |
|---|---|---|---|---|
| 2 July 2022 | FW | (Wales) Lois Cartmell | (England) Preston North End | |
| 4 July 2022 | FW | (Canada) Adriana Leon | (England) West Ham United | |
| 12 July 2022 | FW | (England) Rachel Williams | (England) Tottenham Hotspur | |
| 15 July 2022 | MF | (England) Grace Clinton | (England) Everton | |
| 20 July 2022 | DF | (England) Maya Le Tissier | (England) Brighton & Hove Albion | |
| 25 July 2022 | FW | (Spain) Lucía García | (Spain) Athletic Club | |
| 6 August 2022 | FW | (England) Nikita Parris | (England) Arsenal | |
| 10 August 2022 | DF | (France) Aïssatou Tounkara | (Spain) Atlético Madrid | |
| 21 January 2023 | DF | (Canada) Jayde Riviere | (United States) Michigan Wolverines | |
| 24 January 2023 | MF | (Norway) Lisa Naalsund | (Norway) Brann | |

=== Out ===
| Date | Pos. | Name | To | Ref. |
|---|---|---|---|---|
| 12 May 2022 | FW | (Norway) Karna Solskjær | (Norway) AaFK Fortuna | |
| 10 June 2022 | DF | (England) Poppy Lawson | (Scotland) Hibernian | |
| 30 June 2022 | DF | (Republic of Ireland) Diane Caldwell | (England) Reading (Note: Released, joined Reading on 11 August 2022) | |
| 30 June 2022 | DF | (England) Martha Harris | (England) Birmingham City (Note: Released, joined Birmingham City on 14 July 2022) | |
| 1 July 2022 | GK | (England) Fran Bentley | (England) Bristol City | |
| 15 July 2022 | DF | (Scotland) Kirsty Smith | (England) West Ham United | |
| 6 August 2022 | FW | (England) Maria Edwards | (Germany) SGS Essen | |
| 15 September 2022 | MF | (Netherlands) Jackie Groenen | (France) Paris Saint-Germain | |
| 9 January 2023 | MF | (England) Lucy Staniforth | (England) Aston Villa | |

=== Loans in ===
| Date from | Date to | Pos. | Name | From | Ref. |
|---|---|---|---|---|---|
| 21 January 2023 | 30 June 2023 | MF | (France) Estelle Cascarino | (France) Paris Saint-Germain | |

=== Loans out ===
| Date from | Date to | Pos. | Name | To | Ref. |
|---|---|---|---|---|---|
| 7 July 2022 | 30 June 2023 | FW | (Brazil) Ivana Fuso | (Germany) Bayer Leverkusen | |
| 21 July 2022 | 30 June 2023 | MF | (Wales) Carrie Jones | (England) Leicester City | |
| 22 July 2022 | 30 June 2023 | DF | (England) Tara Bourne | (England) Birmingham City | |
| 5 August 2022 | 30 June 2023 | GK | (England) Emily Ramsey | (England) Everton | |
| 14 August 2022 | 30 June 2023 | MF | (Wales) Chloe Williams (Note: Dual registration) | (England) Blackburn Rovers | |
| 14 August 2022 | 30 June 2023 | DF | (Scotland) Niamh Murphy | (England) Blackburn Rovers | |
| 24 August 2022 | 30 June 2023 | DF | (England) Alyssa Aherne | (England) Burnley | |
| 7 September 2022 | 30 June 2023 | FW | (England) Keira Barry | (England) Derby County | |
| 8 September 2022 | 30 June 2023 | FW | (Scotland) Kirsty Hanson | (England) Aston Villa | |
| 18 September 2022 | 30 June 2023 | DF | (England) Jessica Simpson | (England) Burnley | |
| 14 January 2023 | 30 June 2023 | MF | (England) Grace Clinton | (England) Bristol City | |
| 28 January 2023 | 30 June 2023 | MF | (England) Jade Moore | (England) Reading | |
| 11 February 2023 | 12 February 2023 | GK | (Wales) Safia Middleton-Patel (Note: Emergency goalkeeper loan) | (England) Coventry United | |
| 13 April 2023 | 30 June 2023 | FW | (Canada) Adriana Leon | (United States) Portland Thorns | |
| 26 April 2023 | 30 April 2023 | GK | (Wales) Safia Middleton-Patel | (England) Blackburn Rovers | |
