= 2023 FA Cup =

2023 FA Cup may refer to:

- 2022–23 FA Cup
  - 2023 FA Cup final
- 2022–23 Women's FA Cup
  - 2023 Women's FA Cup final
- 2023–24 FA Cup
- 2023–24 FA Women's Cup
