= 2022–23 FA Women's League Cup =

Tournament details
- Country: England
- Dates: 1 October 2022 – 5 March 2023
- Teams: 24

Final positions
- Champions: Arsenal (6th title)
- Runners-up: Chelsea

Tournament statistics
- Matches played: 44
- Goals scored: 137 (3.11 per match)
- Top goal scorer: (Australia) Sam Kerr Chelsea (6 goals)

The 2022–23 FA Women's League Cup was the twelfth edition of the Women's Super League and Women's Championship's league cup competition. It was sponsored by Continental AG, who have sponsored the competition since its creation in 2011, and was officially known as the FA Women's Continental Tyres League Cup for sponsorship reasons. All 24 teams from the WSL and Championship took part in the competition. Manchester City were the defending champions.

== Format ==
The competition kept the same format as the previous season, starting with a group stage split regionally. Teams competing in the UEFA Women's Champions League group stage were exempt from the League Cup group stage, earning a provisional bye to the quarter-finals. As a result, the initial group stage draw made on 9 August 2022 featured 21 of the 24 teams: one Northern group had five teams drawn into it with the remaining Northern group and all three Southern groups initially featuring four teams each. The three teams excluded from the draw were Chelsea, who automatically entered the Champions League group stage and therefore joined the League Cup at the quarter-final stage, and Manchester City and Arsenal who were taking part in the Champions League qualifying rounds. Should either team be eliminated during qualification, they would enter the League Cup group stage and be drawn into an existing group of four in their geographical region. Manchester City were eliminated from the Champions League in the first qualifying round and were therefore placed in Group B as the only Northern group with four teams.

The first place team in each of the five groups will qualify for the knock-out stage. Because Manchester City failed to progress from Champions League qualifying, one best-placed runner-up will also progress to make up eight teams in the quarter-finals.

== Group stage ==
=== Group A ===
Pos	Team	Pld	W	WPEN	LPEN	L	GF	GA	GD	Pts	Qualification	AST	MUN	DUR	EVE	SHU
1	Aston Villa	4	2	1	1	0	5	3	+2	9	Advanced to knock-out stage	—	1–1	1–0	–	–
2	Manchester United	4	2	0	2	0	11	5	+6	8	Possible knock-out stage based on ranking	–	—	–	4–2	4–0
3	Durham	4	1	2	0	1	6	6	0	7		–	2–2	—	–	3–3
4	Everton	4	1	1	0	2	6	6	0	5		1–1	–	0–1	—	–
5	Sheffield United	4	0	0	1	3	4	12	−8	1		1–2	–	–	3–0	—

Rules for classification: 1) Points; 2) Goal difference; 3) Number of goals scored; 4) Number of wins; 5) Head-to-head record
1 October 2022
12:30

Aston Villa	1–1	Manchester United
Daly 72'	Report	Parris 16'
Penalties
Lehmann (penalty scored); Corsie (penalty scored); Daly (penalty missed); Dali (penalty missed); Mayling (penalty scored); Harding (penalty missed); Pacheco (penalty scored)	4–3	(penalty scored) Zelem; (penalty missed) Ladd; (penalty scored) Bøe Risa; (penalty scored) Le Tissier; (penalty missed) Toone; (penalty missed) Blundell; (penalty missed) Batlle

Bescot Stadium, Walsall
Attendance: 2,109
Referee: Melissa Burgin
2 October 2022
12:00

Durham	3–3	Sheffield United
Hardy 7'; Hepple 17', 71' (pen.)	Report	Walters 43', 64'; Rayner 78'
Penalties
Hepple (penalty scored); Noonan (penalty scored); Robson (penalty scored); Lambert (penalty scored); Farrugia (penalty scored)	5–3	(penalty scored) Sweetman-Kirk; (penalty scored) Rayner; (penalty scored) Cusack; (penalty missed) Newsham

Maiden Castle, Durham
Attendance: 324
Referee: Matthew Corlett

26 October 2022
18:30

Everton	1–1	Aston Villa
Beever-Jones 62'	Report	Harding 49'
Penalties
Graham (penalty scored); Stenevik (penalty scored); Bennison (penalty scored); Galli (penalty missed); Björn (penalty scored)	4–2	(penalty scored) Mayling; (penalty missed) Patten; (penalty scored) Harding; (penalty missed) Blindkilde

Walton Hall Park, Walton Hall Park
Attendance: 1,202
Referee: Thomas Kirk
26 October 2022
19:00

Durham	2–2	Manchester United
Clarke 45+1'; Robson 90+5'	Report	Moore 22'; Bøe Risa 66'
Penalties
Hepple (penalty scored); Hardy (penalty scored); Galloway (penalty scored)	3–1	(penalty missed) Zelem; (penalty missed) Turner; (penalty scored) Bøe Risa; (penalty missed) Le Tissier

Maiden Castle, Durham
Attendance: 1,695
Referee: Thomas Parsons

26 November 2022
17:00

Sheffield United	0–3	Everton
	Report	Snoeijs 54'; Bennison 79'; Park 87'

Glanford Park, Scunthorpe
27 November 2022
18:00

Aston Villa	1–0	Durham
Daly 75'	Report

Bescot Stadium, Walsall
Attendance: 526
Referee: Leigh Doughty

7 December 2022
19:00

Manchester United	4–2	Everton
Bøe Risa 1', 20'; Williams 12'; Moore 27'	Report	Park 25'; Holmgaard 90+2'

Leigh Sports Village, Leigh
Attendance: 1,519
Referee: Simon Kirk
7 December 2022
19:30

Sheffield United	1–2	Aston Villa
Enderby 80' (pen.)	Report	Hanson 20'; Dali 22'

Glanford Park, Scunthorpe
Attendance: 104
Referee: Andrew Kitchen

17 December 2022
12:30

Everton	0–1	Durham
	Report	Crosthwaite 15'

Rossett Park, Crosby
18 December 2022
12:00

Manchester United	4–0	Sheffield United
Leon 12', 44'; Wilson 51' (o.g.); Thomas 63'	Report

Leigh Sports Village, Leigh
Attendance: 1,273

=== Group B ===
Pos	Team	Pld	W	WPEN	LPEN	L	GF	GA	GD	Pts	Qualification	MCI	LIV	LEI	SUN	BLB
1	Manchester City	4	4	0	0	0	12	0	+12	12	Advanced to knock-out stage	—	–	–	3–0	6–0
2	Liverpool	4	3	0	0	1	6	2	+4	9	Possible knock-out stage based on ranking	0–2	—	–	–	1–0
3	Leicester City	4	2	0	0	2	8	5	+3	6		–	0–4	—	–	–
4	Sunderland	3	0	0	0	3	0	9	−9	0		—	0–1	0–5	—	–
5	Blackburn Rovers	3	0	0	0	3	0	10	−10	0		–	–	0–3	C–C	—

Rules for classification: 1) Points; 2) Goal difference; 3) Number of goals scored; 4) Number of wins; 5) Head-to-head record
2 October 2022
11:30

Sunderland	0–1	Liverpool
	Report	Campbell 23'

Eppleton CW, Hetton-le-Hole
Attendance: 590
Referee: Phoebe Cross
2 October 2022
14:00

Blackburn Rovers	0–3	Leicester City
	Report	Smith 6'; Scofield 49'; Whelan 65'

Sir Tom Finney Stadium, Bamber Bridge
Attendance: 247
Referee: Melissa Cairns

26 October 2022
19:00

Leicester City	0–4	Liverpool
	Report	Kearns 14'; Roberts 33'; Furness 45+2'; Stengel 72'

Pirelli Stadium, Burton upon Trent
Attendance: 354
Referee: Tom Nield
26 October 2022
19:30

Manchester City	6–0	Blackburn Rovers
Raso 16'; Fowler 40' (pen.), 69'; Losada 43'; Blakstad 85', 87'	Report

Academy Stadium, Manchester
Attendance: 1,419
Referee: Melissa Burgin

27 November 2022
14:00

Manchester City	3–0	Sunderland
Blakstad 8'; Raso 48'; Shaw 59'	Report

Academy Stadium, Manchester
Attendance: 1,672
Referee: Stacey Fullicks
27 November 2022
14:00

Liverpool	1–0	Blackburn Rovers
Matthews 45'	Report

Prenton Park, Birkenhead
Attendance: 969
Referee: Melissa Burgin

7 December 2022
19:00

Liverpool	0–2	Manchester City
	Report	Angeldahl 57'; Fowler 74'

Prenton Park, Birkenhead
Attendance: 965
Referee: Martin Woods
11 January 2023 (Note: Sunderland vs Leicester City was postponed due to a frozen pitch on 8 December 2022.)
13:30

Sunderland	0–5	Leicester City
	Report	Goodwin 45+9'; Tierney 70'; Baker 77'; Pike 82', 90+1'

Eppleton CW, Hetton-le-Hole

18 January 2023 (Note: Leicester City v Manchester City was postponed due to a frozen pitch on 17 December 2022.)
19:00

Leicester City	0–1	Manchester City
	Report	Angeldahl 90'

Pirelli Stadium, Burton upon Trent
Attendance: 651
18 January 2023 (Note: Blackburn Rovers v Sunderland was postponed due to a frozen pitch on 15 December 2022. The game was postponed for a second time on 18 January 2023, again for a frozen pitch.)
19:45

Blackburn Rovers	Cancelled	Sunderland

Sir Tom Finney Stadium, Bamber Bridge

=== Group C ===
Pos	Team	Pld	W	WPEN	LPEN	L	GF	GA	GD	Pts	Qualification	WHU	BHA	LCL	BIR
1	West Ham United	3	1	1	1	0	4	2	+2	6	Advanced to knock-out stage	—	–	–	2–0
2	Brighton & Hove Albion	3	1	1	0	1	4	4	0	5	Possible knock-out stage based on ranking	0–0	—	–	–
3	London City Lionesses	3	1	0	1	1	5	5	0	4		2–2	1–2	—	–
4	Birmingham City	3	1	0	0	2	4	6	−2	3		–	3–2	1–2	—

Rules for classification: 1) Points; 2) Goal difference; 3) Number of goals scored; 4) Number of wins; 5) Head-to-head record
2 October 2022
14:00

Birmingham City	3–2	Brighton & Hove Albion
Smith 25'; Pennock 53'; Lu. Quinn 62'	Report	Lee 59'; Carter 89' (pen.)

St Andrew's, Birmingham
Attendance: 461
Referee: Ritchie Watkins
2 October 2022
14:00

London City Lionesses	2–2	West Ham United
Heuchan 26'; Ewens 62'	Report	Brynjarsdóttir 90+4'; Asseyi 67'
Penalties
Hopcroft (penalty scored); Agg (penalty scored); Joel (penalty missed); Nolan (penalty scored); Yanez (penalty missed); Primus (penalty scored); Neville (penalty scored); Bennett (penalty missed); Shepherd (penalty scored); Muya (penalty scored); Girasoli (penalty scored); Hopcroft (penalty scored); Agg (penalty missed)	9–10	(penalty missed) Longhurst; (penalty scored) Asseyi; (penalty scored) Filis; (penalty missed) Evans; (penalty scored) Brynjarsdóttir; (penalty scored) Fisk; (penalty scored) Shimizu; (penalty missed) Smith; (penalty scored) Hayashi; (penalty scored) Kyvåg; (penalty scored) Arnold; (penalty scored) Filis; (penalty scored) Brynjarsdóttir

Princes Park, Dartford
Attendance: 410
Referee: Kirsty Dowle

27 November 2022
12:00

London City Lionesses	1–2	Brighton & Hove Albion
Muya 53'	Report	Terland 35'; Williams 65'

Princes Park, Dartford
Attendance: 268
Referee: Kirsty Dowle
27 November 2022
15:00

West Ham United	2–0	Birmingham City
Longhurst 15'; Brynjarsdóttir 75' (pen.)	Report

Victoria Road, Dagenham
Attendance: 585
Referee: Emily Heaslip

17 December 2022
14:00

Birmingham City	1–2	London City Lionesses
Quinn 45'	Report	Ewens 48', 89'

St Andrew's, Birmingham
Attendance: 481
Referee: Jeda Wardle
18 January 2023 (Note: Brighton & Hove Albion v West Ham United was postponed due to a frozen pitch on 17 December 2022.)
19:30

Brighton & Hove Albion	0–0	West Ham United
	Report
Penalties
Symonds (penalty scored); Williams (penalty scored); Fox (penalty scored)	3–0	(penalty missed) Filis; (penalty missed) Fisk; (penalty missed) Houssein

Broadfield Stadium, Crawley
Attendance: 1,005
Referee: Kirsty Dowle

=== Group D ===
Pos	Team	Pld	W	WPEN	LPEN	L	GF	GA	GD	Pts	Qualification	BRI	LEW	CHA	CRY
1	Bristol City	3	2	0	0	1	6	2	+4	6	Advanced to knock-out stage	—	–	–	4–0
2	Lewes	3	2	0	0	1	6	2	+4	6	Possible knock-out stage based on ranking	0–1	—	2–0	–
3	Charlton Athletic	3	2	0	0	1	4	3	+1	6		2–1	–	—	2–0
4	Crystal Palace	3	0	0	0	3	1	10	−9	0		–	1–4	–	—

Rules for classification: 1) Points; 2) Goal difference; 3) Number of goals scored; 4) Number of wins; 5) Head-to-head record
2 October 2022
14:00

Lewes	2–0	Charlton Athletic
Howells 44'; Hack 90+3'	Report

The Dripping Pan, Lewes
Attendance: 403
Referee: C. Small
2 October 2022
15:00

Bristol City	4–0	Crystal Palace
Harrison 9', 25'; Mustaki 78'; Syme 84'	Report

Robins High Performance Centre, Failand
Attendance: 423

27 November 2022
14:00

Crystal Palace	1–4	Lewes
Sharpe 89'	Report	Thompson 7', 20'; Reilly 24' (o.g.); Kraft 42'

Hayes Lane, Bromley
Attendance: 296
Referee: Aimee Keir
27 November 2022
14:00

Charlton Athletic	2–1	Bristol City
Skeels 10', 60'	Report	Harrison 90+1'

The Oakwood, Bexley
Attendance: 296
Referee: Nicoleta Bria

11 January 2023 (Note: Charlton Athletic v Crystal Palace was postponed due to a frozen pitch on 18 December 2022.)
13:30

Charlton Athletic	2–0	Crystal Palace
Follis 75'; Bell 90+1'	Report

The Oakwood, Bexley
Attendance: 302
18 January 2023 (Note: Lewes v Bristol City was postponed due to a frozen pitch on 16 December 2022. The game had been switched to a Bristol City home match on 16 December after Lewes had deemed their pitch unplayable the previous day but reverted to a Lewes home game once rescheduled.)
18:00

Lewes	0–1	Bristol City
	Report	Hutton 29'

The Dripping Pan, Lewes

=== Group E ===
Pos	Team	Pld	W	WPEN	LPEN	L	GF	GA	GD	Pts	Qualification	TOT	REA	COV	SOU
1	Tottenham Hotspur	3	3	0	0	0	8	2	+6	9	Advanced to knock-out stage	—	–	5–1	–
2	Reading	3	2	0	0	1	8	2	+6	6	Possible knock-out stage based on ranking	1–2	—	–	–
3	Coventry United	3	1	0	0	2	3	9	−6	3		–	0–4	—	2–0
4	Southampton	3	0	0	0	3	0	6	−6	0		0–1	0–3	–	—

Rules for classification: 1) Points; 2) Goal difference; 3) Number of goals scored; 4) Number of wins; 5) Head-to-head record
2 October 2022
14:00

Reading	1–2	Tottenham Hotspur
Dowie 90+11' (pen.)	Report	Neville 7'; Karczewska 30'

Madejski Stadium, Reading
Attendance: 2,200
Referee: Amy Fearn
2 October 2022
15:00

Coventry United	2–0	Southampton
Dudley-Jones 50'; Wiseman 55'	Report

Butts Park Arena, Coventry
Attendance: 264

27 November 2022
14:00

Southampton	0–3	Reading
	Report	Troelsgaard 5'; Wade 38'; Vanhaevermaet 60'

St Mary's Stadium, Southampton
Attendance: 4,258
Referee: Louise Saunders
27 November 2022
14:00

Tottenham Hotspur	5–1	Coventry United
Summanen 6'; Ayane 14'; Harrop 25'; Turner 60'; Gunning-Williams 90+3'	Report	Orthodoxou 90+1'

Brisbane Road, Leyton
Attendance: 566
Referee: Josh Smith

16 December 2022
19:00

Coventry United	0–4	Reading
	Report	Dowie 4', 26'; Troelsgaard 17'; Wellings 64'

Butts Park Arena, Coventry
Attendance: 192
Referee: Phoebe Cross
18 December 2022
12:00

Southampton	0–1	Tottenham Hotspur
	Report	Karczewska 26'

St Mary's Stadium, Southampton
Attendance: 2,725
Referee: Stacey Fullicks

=== Ranking of second-placed teams ===
Due to Manchester City's failure to progress from Champions League qualifying, they entered the League Cup group stage. With only two teams receiving byes to the League Cup quarter-finals, the best-placed runner-up team progressed with the five group winners to make up the final eight. With the three Southern groups containing one fewer team than the two Northern groups, the ranking to determine which second-placed team progressed was calculated on a points-per-game basis.

Pos	Grp	Team	Pld	W	WPEN	LPEN	L	GF	GA	GD	Pts	PPG	Qualification
1	B	Liverpool	4	3	0	0	1	6	2	+4	9	2.25	Advanced to knock-out stage
2	A	Manchester United	4	2	0	2	0	11	5	+6	8	2.00	
3	E	Reading	3	2	0	0	1	8	2	+6	6	2.00	
4	C	Brighton & Hove Albion	3	2	0	0	1	6	2	+4	6	2.00	
5	D	Lewes	3	2	0	0	1	6	2	+4	6	2.00	

== Knock-out stage ==
Quarter-finals
Arsenal	3
Aston Villa	0
Bristol City	0
Manchester City	6
Liverpool	0
West Ham United	1
Tottenham Hotspur	1
Chelsea	3

Semi-finals
Arsenal	1
Manchester City	0
West Ham United	0
Chelsea	7

Final
Arsenal	3
Chelsea	1

=== Quarter-finals ===
Chelsea and Arsenal entered the League Cup at the quarter-final stage, having been exempt from the group stage due to their participation in the Champions League group stage.

25 January 2023
19:00

Bristol City	0–6	Manchester City
	Report	Raso 8', 12'; Shaw 30'; Hemp 35', 60'; Fowler 44'

Ashton Gate, Bristol
Attendance: 2,647
Referee: Thomas Kirk

25 January 2023
19:30

Liverpool	0–1	West Ham United
	Report	Brynjarsdóttir 87'

Prenton Park, Birkenhead
Attendance: 510
Referee: Martin Woods

25 January 2023
19:45

Tottenham Hotspur	1–3	Chelsea
Spence 90+4'	Report	Kerr 38', 86'; Kirby 68'

Brisbane Road, Leyton
Attendance: 657
Referee: Sunny Sukhvir Gill

26 January 2023
19:45

Arsenal	3–0	Aston Villa
Maanum 29', 50'; Foord 60'	Report

Meadow Park, Borehamwood
Attendance: 2,959
Referee: Carl Brook

=== Semi-finals ===
8 February 2023
19:15

Arsenal	1–0 (a.e.t.)	Manchester City
Blackstenius 93'	Report

Meadow Park, Borehamwood
Attendance: 1,795
Referee: Abigail Byrne

9 February 2023
19:15

West Ham United	0–7	Chelsea
	Report	Kerr 3', 22', 45+1', 60'; Kirby 10'; James 55'; Reiten 65'

Victoria Road, Dagenham
Attendance: 1,092
Referee: Louise Saunders

=== Final ===
On 5 December 2022, it was announced that the 2023 FA Women's League Cup Final would be held at Selhurst Park, the home of Crystal Palace, for the first time. The final took place on 5 March 2023.

5 March 2023
15:00 GMT

Arsenal	3–1	Chelsea
Blackstenius 16'; Little 24' (pen.); Charles 45+5' (o.g.)	Report	Kerr 2'

Selhurst Park, Selhurst
Attendance: 19,010
Referee: Kirsty Dowle

== Top goalscorers ==
Rank	Player	Club	Goals
1	(Australia) Sam Kerr	Chelsea	6
2	(Australia) Mary Fowler	Manchester City	4
2	(Australia) Hayley Raso	Manchester City	4
4	(England) Natasha Dowie	Reading	3
4	(Scotland) Abi Harrison	Bristol City	3
4	(Scotland) Sarah Ewens	London City Lionesses	3
4	(Norway) Julie Blakstad	Manchester City	3
4	(Norway) Vilde Bøe Risa	Manchester United	3
4	(Iceland) Dagny Brynjarsdóttir	West Ham United	3
10	16 players		2

== See also ==
- 2022–23 Women's Super League
- 2022–23 Women's Championship
