= Aïssatou Tounkara =

French footballer (born 1995)

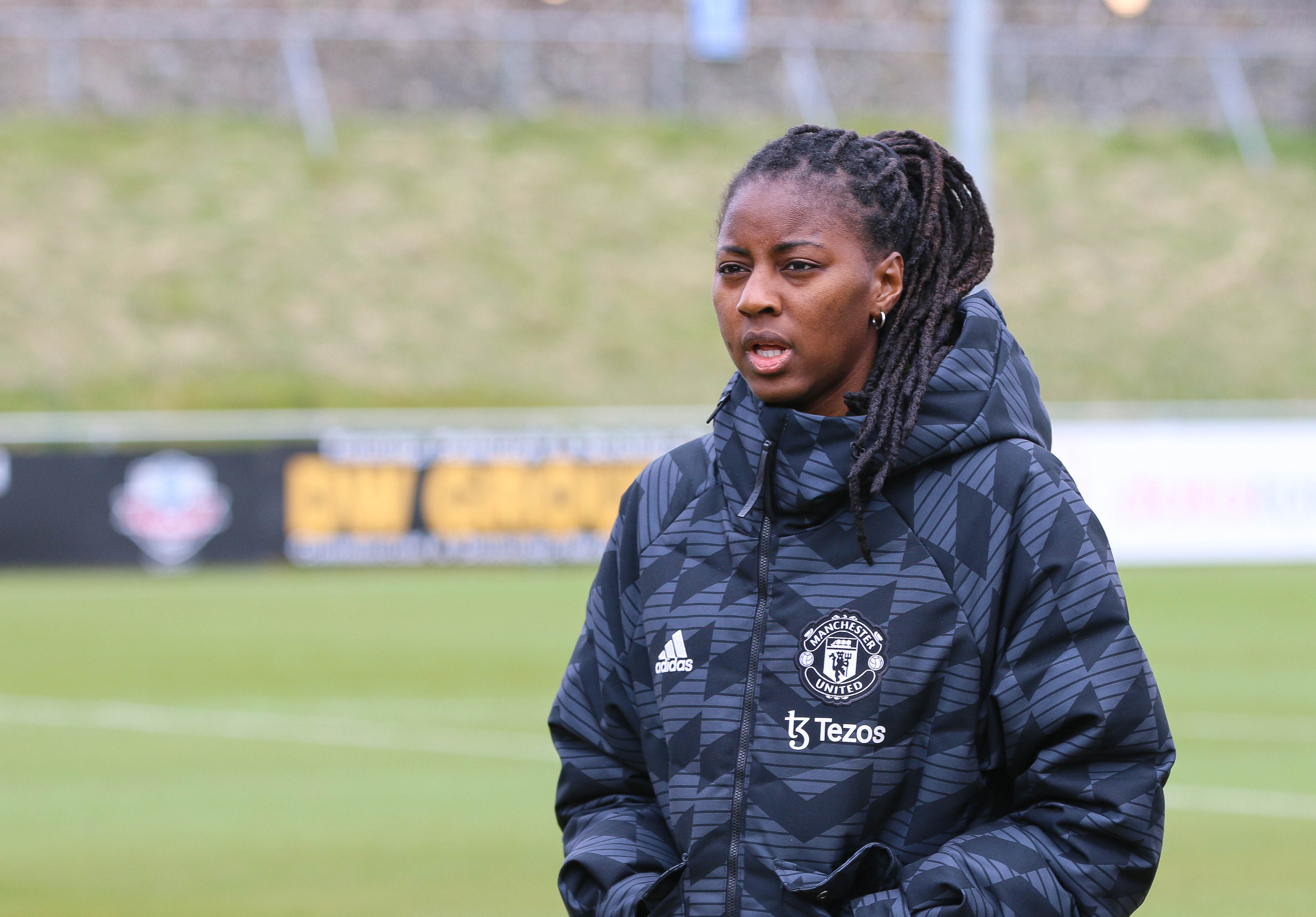
- Tounkara in 2023

Personal information
- Full name: Aïssatou Tounkara
- Date of birth: 16 March 1995 (age 31)
- Place of birth: Paris, France
- Height: 1.74 m (5 ft 9 in)
- Position: Defender

Youth career
- 2006–2008: Buttes Chaumont SC
- 2008–2010: Issy
- 2010–2014: Juvisy

Senior career*
Years	Team	Apps	(Gls)
2011–2018	Paris FC	87	(3)
2018–2022	Atlético Madrid	83	(6)
2022–2023	Manchester United	1	(0)
2023–2025	Paris Saint-Germain	7	(0)
2024–2025	→ Fleury (loan)	7	(0)
Total		185	(9)

International career
2011	France U16	3	(0)
2012	France U17	14	(0)
2013–2014	France U19	17	(0)
2014	France U20	7	(1)
2015–2016	France U23	4	(0)
2016–2023	France	40	(3)
- * Club domestic league appearances and goals

Aïssatou Tounkara (born 16 March 1995) is a French former professional footballer who played as a defender.

== Club career ==
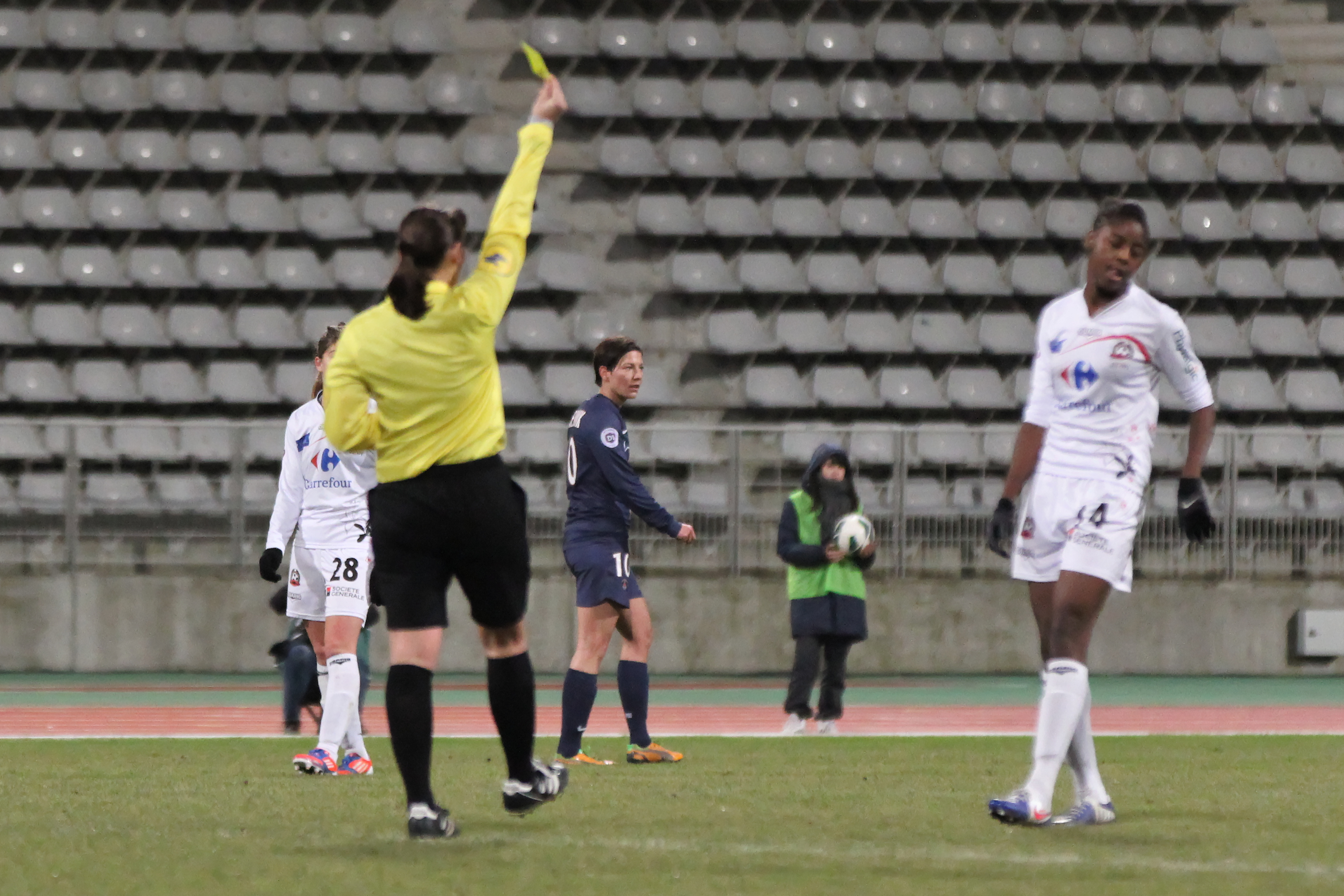
Tounkara receiving a yellow card while playing for Juvisy on 9 December 2012.

Tounkara started her career at the Buttes Chaumont FC club, where she stayed until the fall of 2008 when she joined the Football Féminin Issy-les-Moulineaux, whose team was then in Division 2 Féminine. In the offseason of 2010, Tounkara joined FCF Juvisy in the Division 1 Féminine.

On 10 August 2022, Tounkara joined English Women's Super League side Manchester United on a two-year contract. On 30 June 2023, it was announced that Tounkara would leave the club after just one season. She made five appearances in all competitions including one in the league.

On 21 August 2023, Tounkara joined Paris Saint-Germain on a two-year contract.

== International career ==
=== Youth ===
She was part of several French youth teams. She debuted for the France U16 team against Norway on 4 July 2011. Tounkara also represented France in many international competitions. In 2012, she was part of the squad that played at the UEFA Women's Under-17 Championship, in which France finished second. In September of the same year, she was called to represent France at the 2012 FIFA U-17 Women's World Cup in Azerbaijan. Tounkara was a titular along the whole tournament and played the final match in which France defeated North Korea on penalties and became champions. In August 2013, Tounkara traveled to Wales to represent France U19 at the 2013 UEFA Women's Under-19 Championship. The team did very well, defeating England in the great final and taking the title. In August 2014, Tounkara was called to represent France U20 at the 2014 FIFA U-20 Women's World Cup in Canada. The French team finished third.

=== Senior ===
In 2017, she was part of the squad that represented France at the UEFA Women's Euro 2017. She also featured for France at the 2022 UEFA Women's Euro where France reached the semi-finals after being eliminated by Germany.

On 7 July 2023, Tounkara replaced the injured Amandine Henry in France's squad for the 2023 FIFA Women's World Cup.

== Personal life ==
Born in France, Tounkara is of Gambian descent.

== Career statistics ==
=== Club ===
As of 18 December 2022.

Appearances and goals by club, season and competition
Club	Season	League			National Cup (Note: Includes the Coupe de France, Copa de la Reina and FA Cup)		League Cup (Note: Includes the FA Women's League Cup)		Continental (Note: Includes the UEFA Champions League)		Other (Note: Includes the Supercopa de España)		Total	
Club	Season	Division	Apps	Goals	Apps	Goals	Apps	Goals	Apps	Goals	Apps	Goals	Apps	Goals
Juvisy	2011–12	D1F	3	0	0	0	—		—		—		3	0
Juvisy	2012–13	D1F	10	0	0	0	—		2	0	—		12	0
Juvisy	2013–14	D1F	10	3	1	0	—		—		—		11	3
Juvisy	2014–15	D1F	19	0	3	1	—		—		—		22	1
Juvisy	2015–16	D1F	19	0	2	0	—		—		—		21	0
Juvisy	2016–17	D1F	20	0	3	0	—		—		—		23	0
Juvisy	2017–18	D1F	6	0	1	0	—		—		—		7	0
Juvisy	Total		87	3	10	1	0	0	2	0	0	0	99	4
Atlético Madrid	2018–19	Primera División	22	2	4	0	—		3	0	—		29	2
Atlético Madrid	2019–20	Primera División	20	1	1	0	—		5	0	1	0	27	1
Atlético Madrid	2020–21	Primera División	26	1	2	0	—		3	1	1	0	32	2
Atlético Madrid	2021–22	Primera División	15	2	1	0	—		—		1	0	17	2
Atlético Madrid	Total		83	6	8	0	0	0	11	1	3	0	105	7
Manchester United	2022–23	Women's Super League	1	0	0	0	4	0	—		—		5	0
Career total			171	9	18	1	4	0	13	1	3	0	209	11

=== International ===
As of 8 August 2023

Appearances and goals by national team and year
National team	Year	Apps	Goals
France	2016	1	0
France	2017	3	0
France	2018	3	0
France	2019	7	0
France	2020	4	0
France	2021	11	2
France	2022	10	1
France	2023	1	0
Total		40	3

Scores and results list France's goal tally first, score column indicates score after each Tounkara goal.

List of international goals scored by Aïssatou Tounkara
No.	Date	Venue	Opponent	Score	Result	Competition
1	22 October 2021	Stade Dominique Duvauchelle, Créteil, France	Estonia	8–0	11–0	2023 FIFA Women's World Cup qualification
2	22 October 2021	Stade Dominique Duvauchelle, Créteil, France	Estonia	9–0	11–0	2023 FIFA Women's World Cup qualification
3	1 July 2022	Stade de la Source, Orléans, France	Vietnam	7–0	7–0	Friendly

== Honours ==
Atlético Madrid

- Primera División Femenina: 2018–19
- Supercopa de Espana: 2020–21

Paris Saint-Germain

- Coupe de France: 2023–24

France U17

- UEFA Women's Under-17 Championship runner-up: 2012
- FIFA U-17 Women's World Cup: 2012

France U19

- UEFA Women's Under-19 Championship: 2013

France

- SheBelieves Cup: 2017
- Tournoi de France: 2020
