= Karna Solskjær =

Norwegian footballer

Personal information
- Date of birth: 3 March 2003 (age 23)
- Place of birth: Norway
- Position: Forward

Team information
- Current team: Aalesunds

Youth career
- –2019: Clausenengen
- 2019–2022: Manchester United

Senior career*
Years	Team	Apps	(Gls)
2018–2019	Clausenengen	16	(15)
2022	Manchester United	1	(0)
2022–	Aalesunds	16	(6)

International career
2021	Norway U19	2	(0)
- * Club domestic league appearances and goals

Karna Solskjær (born 3 March 2003) is a Norwegian footballer who plays as a forward for Aalesunds.

== Career and early life ==
Karna Solskjær is the daughter of Ole Gunnar Solskjær, a former player and manager of Premier League club Manchester United.

She started her youth career in Clausenengen before moving on to Manchester United U21's. She made her youth international debut in 2021.

She made her senior debut on 30 January 2022 in a 2021–22 Women's FA Cup match against Bridgwater United coming as a substitute for Ivana Fuso. In making her debut she and her father became the first father-daughter pair to play for Manchester United.

On 9 March 2022, she played 61 minutes before coming off for Keira Barry as Manchester United Women Under-21s were crowned winners of the 2022 WSL Academy Cup following a 4–1 victory over Birmingham City in the final at St George’s Park.

In 2022, Solskjær signed for Norwegian second tier club Aalesunds, and helped them gain promotion after the 2024-25 season.
