= 2023 Women's FA Cup final =

English football cup final

2023 Women's FA Cup Final
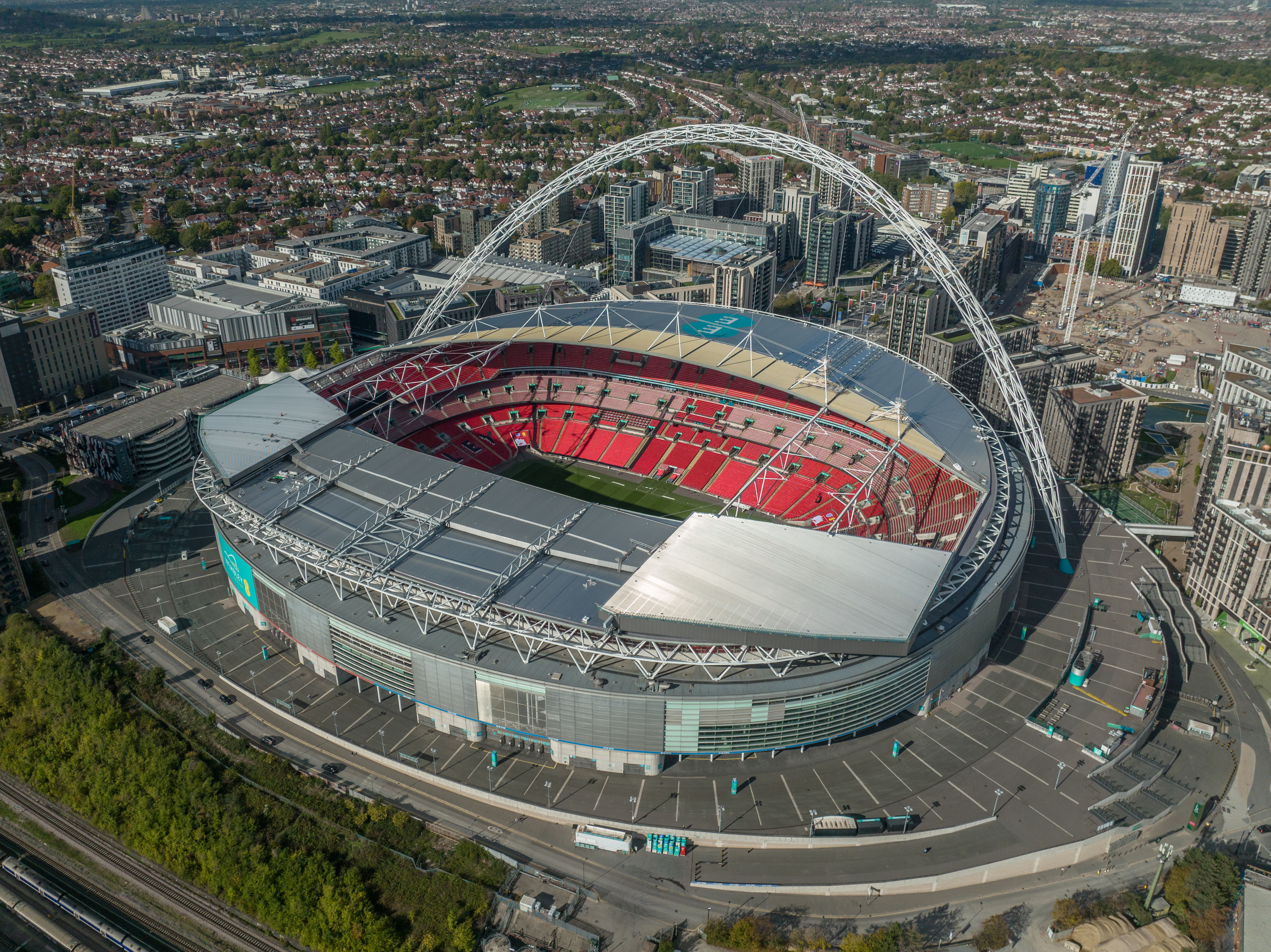
- The match took place at Wembley Stadium.
- Event: 2022–23 Women's FA Cup
Chelsea	Manchester United
1	0
- Date: 14 May 2023
- Venue: Wembley Stadium, London
- Player of the Match: Sam Kerr (Chelsea)
- Referee: Emily Heaslip (Suffolk)
- Attendance: 77,390

The 2023 Women's FA Cup final was the 53rd final of the Women's FA Cup, England's primary cup competition for women's football teams. The showpiece event was the 29th to be played directly under the auspices of The Football Association (FA) and was named the Vitality Women's FA Cup Final due to sponsorship reasons.

The final was contested between Manchester United and Chelsea, on 14 May 2023 at Wembley Stadium in London.

Chelsea were the defending champions of the last two editions, and won their third consecutive cup on a 68th-minute Sam Kerr goal assisted by a Pernille Harder cross. The attendance of 77,390 broke the previous cup's record of 49,094, and also set a new world record for attendance to a match in a domestic women's competition, topping the 60,739 attendance to Atlético Madrid against Barcelona in the Primera División on 19 March 2019.

VAR was not only used for the first time in the final but also the first time that it was used in an English women's competitions league or cup.

== Match ==
=== Details ===
14 May 2023
14:30 BST

Chelsea	1–0	Manchester United
Kerr 68'	FA report BBC report

Wembley Stadium, London
Attendance: 77,390
Referee: Emily Heaslip (Suffolk)

Chelsea	Manchester United

GK	30	(Germany) Ann-Katrin Berger
RB	15	(France) Ève Périsset
CB	18	(Norway) Maren Mjelde
CB	16	(Sweden) Magdalena Eriksson (c)
LB	21	(England) Niamh Charles	(yellow card) 56'	(substituted off) 72'
RM	8	(Germany) Melanie Leupolz		(substituted off) 57'
CM	17	(Canada) Jessie Fleming		(substituted off) 57'
LM	22	(Scotland) Erin Cuthbert
RW	10	(England) Lauren James	(yellow card) 80'	(substituted off) 88'
CF	20	(Australia) Sam Kerr	68'
LW	11	(Norway) Guro Reiten	(yellow card) 53'
Substitutes:
GK	1	(Sweden) Zećira Mušović
CM	5	(Wales) Sophie Ingle	(yellow card) 87'	(substituted on) 57'
DF	7	(England) Jess Carter		(substituted on) 72'
MF	13	(Czech Republic) Kateřina Svitková
MF	19	(Sweden) Johanna Rytting Kaneryd
RW	23	(Denmark) Pernille Harder		(substituted on) 57'
DF	26	(Canada) Kadeisha Buchanan		(substituted on) 88'
LW	27	(Russia) Alsu Abdullina
MF	28	(Serbia) Jelena Čanković
Manager:
(England) Emma Hayes

GK	27	(England) Mary Earps
RB	2	(Spain) Ona Batlle
CB	15	(England) Maya Le Tissier
CB	21	(England) Millie Turner
LB	6	(England) Hannah Blundell	(substituted off) 79'
RM	10	(England) Katie Zelem (c)
LM	12	(Wales) Hayley Ladd	(substituted off) 90+1'
RW	22	(England) Nikita Parris	(substituted off) 61'
CAM	7	(England) Ella Toone	(substituted off) 79'
CF	23	(England) Alessia Russo
LW	11	(England) Leah Galton
Substitutes:
DF	5	(Republic of Ireland) Aoife Mannion	(substituted on) 79'
MF	8	(Norway) Vilde Bøe Risa
FW	9	(Scotland) Martha Thomas	(substituted on) 90+1'
DF	14	(Canada) Jayde Riviere
MF	16	(Norway) Lisa Naalsund
FW	17	(Spain) Lucía García	(substituted on) 79'
FW	28	(England) Rachel Williams	(substituted on) 61'
DF	29	(France) Estelle Cascarino
GK	32	(England) Sophie Baggaley
Manager:
(England) Marc Skinner

Player of the match
Sam Kerr (Chelsea)

Assistant referees:
Georgia Ball (Derbyshire)
Chloe-Ann Small (Hampshire)
Fourth official:
Abigail Byrne (Cambridgeshire)
Reserve assistant referee:
Sophie Dennington (Berks & Bucks)
Video assistant referee:
Michael Salisbury (Lancashire)
Assistant video assistant referee:
Sian Massey-Ellis (Birmingham)

Match rules

- 90 minutes
- 30 minutes of extra-time if necessary
- Penalty shoot-out if scores still level
- Nine named substitutes
- Maximum of five substitutions in three normal-time stoppages and/or a fourth stoppage in extra-time

=== Statistics ===
Overall
Statistic	Chelsea	Manchester United
Goals scored	1	0
Total shots	8	14
Shots on target	4	5
Ball possession	48%	52%
Corner kicks	0	2
Fouls committed	9	10
Yellow cards	4	0
Red cards	0	0
