= Vilde Bøe Risa =

Norwegian football player (born 1995)

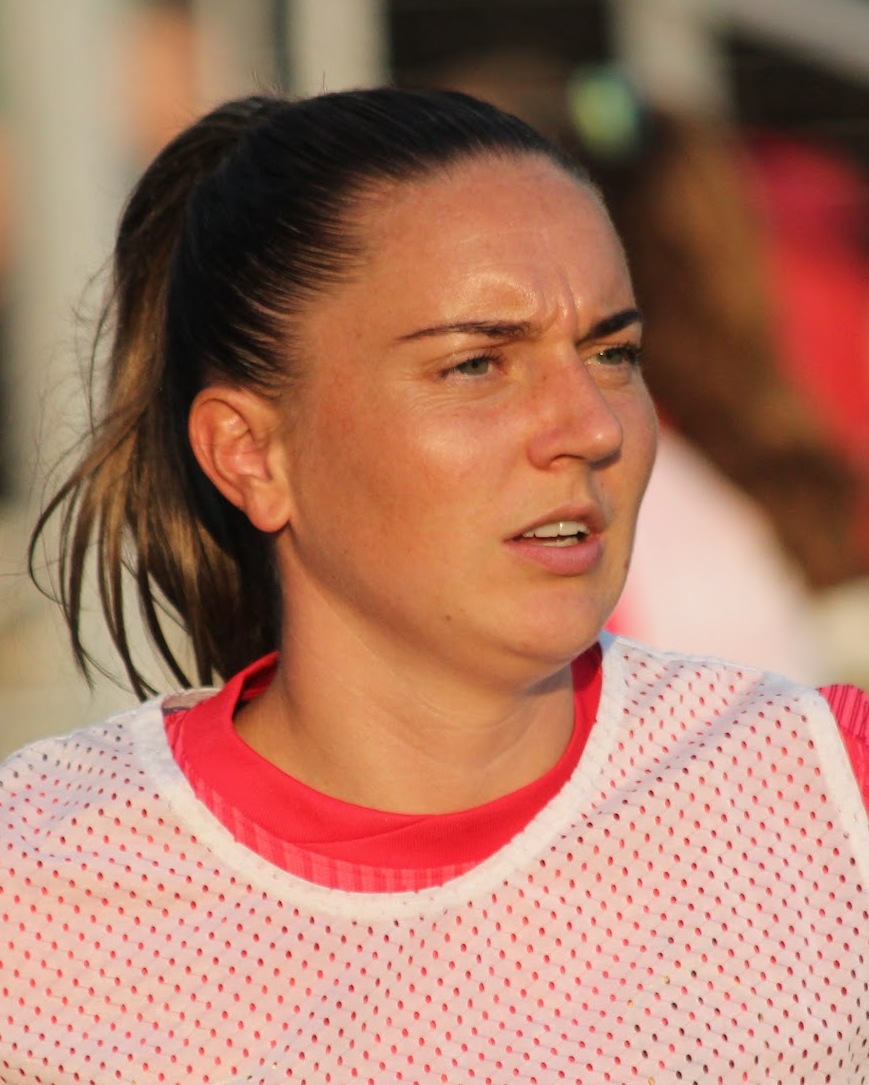
- Bøe Risa with the North Carolina Courage in 2026

Personal information
- Date of birth: 13 July 1995 (age 31)
- Place of birth: Bergen, Norway
- Height: 1.64 m (5 ft 5 in)
- Position: Midfielder

Team information
- Current team: North Carolina Courage
- Number: 26

Youth career
- Åsane

Senior career*
Years	Team	Apps	(Gls)
2012–2018	Arna-Bjørnar	121	(15)
2019–2020	Kopparbergs/Göteborg FC	37	(5)
2021	Sandviken	3	(0)
2021–2023	Manchester United	29	(2)
2023–2026	Atlético Madrid	83	(8)
2026–	North Carolina Courage	14	(1)

International career^{‡}
2011	Norway U16	9	(0)
2012	Norway U17	4	(0)
2012–2014	Norway U19	24	(1)
2014–2016	Norway U23	11	(3)
2016–	Norway	97	(4)
- * Club domestic league appearances and goals as of 06:51, 8 November 2026 (UTC) ‡ National team caps and goals as of 14 October 2026

Vilde Bøe Risa (born 13 July 1995) is a Norwegian professional footballer who plays as a midfielder for the North Carolina Courage of the National Women's Soccer League (NWSL) and the Norway national team.

She has previously played for Arna-Bjørnar and Sandviken of the Norwegian Toppserien, Swedish Damallsvenskan club Kopparbergs/Göteborg FC, English Women's Super League club Manchester United, and Spanish Liga F club Atlético Madrid.

== Club career ==
=== Arna-Bjørnar ===
Having come through the youth system at local third-division side Åsane and helping the team reach two youth cup finals, Bøe Risa joined Toppserien side Arna-Bjørnar in 2012. She made her senior top-flight debut on 14 April 2012 as a 63rd-minute substitute for Lisa Naalsund in a 1–1 draw with Røa IL on the opening day of the season. She scored her first goal for the club on 30 June 2012 as Arna-Bjørnar beat Vålerenga 5–0. Rise made 16 league appearances and a further three in the cup in her debut season as Arna-Bjørnar equaled their best ever Toppserien finish in third-place. Bøe Risa established herself as an important player the following season, starting in 12 of 18 appearances as Arna-Bjørnar repeated their third-place finish before her playing time increased again the following year with the team again finishing third.

Bøe Risa was named captain ahead of the 2016 season and played all but three minutes in all competitions, only being withdrawn from a 3–0 defeat to Avaldsnes IL in the 87th minute on 11 June. Having featured in every Arna-Bjørnar match since the start of 2014, she missed the entire 2017 Toppserien season with an ACL injury. She returned in 2018 and recaptured her best form, scoring a career-high seven goals in all competitions.

=== Kopparbergs/Göteborg FC ===
In December 2018, Bøe Risa signed a professional contract with Swedish Damallsvenskan club Kopparbergs/Göteborg FC. Göteborg won the Svenska Cupen on 1 May 2019, beating Kristianstads DFF in the final. On 25 September 2019, Bøe Risa made her UEFA Women's Champions League debut, starting in a round of 32 second leg 1–0 win over Bayern Munich. Despite the victory, Göteborg were eliminated on away goals. Bøe Risa signed a one-year contract extension ahead of the 2020 Damallsvenskan season. In July, it was announced Bøe Risa was appointed captain following enforced absences to regular captain Beata Kollmats, and replacements Elin Rubensson and Emma Berglund. On 7 November 2020, Göteborg won their first league title in club history with one game to spare following a 7–0 win over Linköpings FC. Bøe Risa scored twice during the deciding match. On 9 December 2020, Bøe Risa scored her first Champions League goal in a 2–1 loss to Manchester City in the first leg of the round of 32. She signed a one-day contract extension the following week in order to play in the second leg as Göteborg were eliminated 5–1 on aggregate. Despite the league title win, plans were revealed to fold Kopparbergs/Göteborg FC in December 2020 due to financial insecurities. The team was taken over by BK Häcken the following month but Bøe Risa, who had a standing offer to return, elected not to re-sign.

=== Sandviken ===
With the search for a foreign club hampered by the COVID-19 pandemic, Bøe Risa trained in her native Norway with Sandviken to keep up her fitness during the offseason and eventually signed a one-year contract with the club on 26 April 2021 ahead of the 2021 season. On 21 June, having appeared three times for Sandviken, Bøe Risa announced the mutual termination of her contract in preparation for a move to another club.

=== Manchester United ===
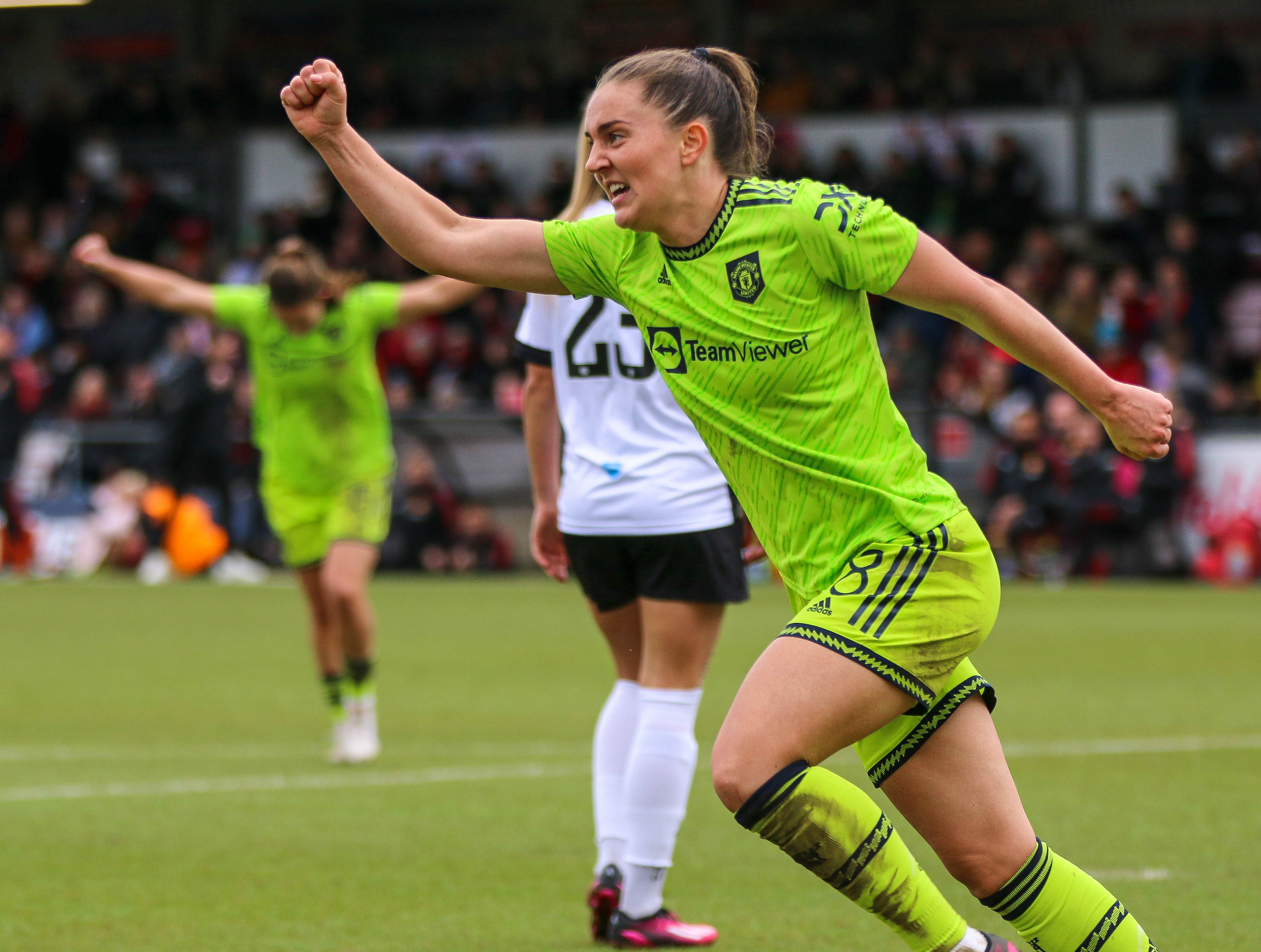
Bøe Risa playing for Manchester United against Lewes in 2023.

On 20 July 2021, it was announced Bøe Risa had signed a two-year contract with a further option year with English Women's Super League club Manchester United.

=== Atlético Madrid ===
On 12 September 2023, it was announced that Bøe Risa had signed a one-year contract with Spanish Liga F club Atlético Madrid.

=== North Carolina Courage ===
On 29 July 2026, Bøe Risa signed a two-and-a-half-year deal with the National Women's Soccer League (NWSL)'s North Carolina Courage.

== International career ==
=== Youth ===
Bøe Risa began representing Norway at under-16 level in 2011. In 2012, she represented the under-17 team during the second round of 2012 UEFA Women's Under-17 Championship qualification. She started all three games as Norway beat Poland and the Republic of Ireland before missing out on qualification with a 4–0 defeat to France.

In October 2020, Bøe Risa was called up to the under-19 squad during the first round of 2013 UEFA Women's Under-19 Championship qualifying. She scored her first international goal at youth level in the opening game against Turkey. Having qualified as the best placed runners-up from the second round, Bøe Risa was named to the squad for the final tournament and started all three games as Norway were eliminated at the group stage having lost to Germany and Finland before beating Sweden in a dead rubber. Norway automatically qualified as hosts for the 2014 UEFA Women's Under-19 Championship and Bøe Risa was selected as captain for the home nation. After a goalless draw with the Netherlands, Norway beat Belgium and Scotland to advance to the semi-finals where they lost to Spain. Bøe Risa started all four games.

Between 2014 and 2016, Bøe Risa continued through the age groups, making 11 appearances for the under-23s including at La Manga and Nordic Tournaments.

=== Senior ===
On 19 September 2016, Bøe Risa made her senior international debut for Norway women's national football team as a 65th-minute substitute for Caroline Graham Hansen against Israel during UEFA Euro 2017 qualifying. She scored six minutes into her first international appearance as part of the 5–0 victory. However, she had her hopes of competing at the tournament finals dashed after suffering an ACL injury in February 2017.

It took 12 months for Bøe Risa to recover, making her comeback appearance in February 2018 against Australia during the 2018 Algarve Cup. During 2018, Bøe Risa made four substitute appearances during 2019 FIFA Women's World Cup qualification as Norway topped their group ahead of reigning European champions Netherlands. She was named to the 2019 FIFA Women's World Cup squad the following summer. Bøe Risa started all five of Norway's World Cup games in France as the team reached the quarter-final stage before losing 3–0 to England.

Bøe Risa was part of the squad that was called up to the UEFA Women's Euro 2022.

On 19 June 2023, she was included in the 23-player Norway squad for the 2023 FIFA Women's World Cup.

On 16 June 2025, Bøe Risa was called up to the Norway squad for the UEFA Women's Euro 2025.

== Personal life ==
Vilde's father, Terje Risa, played 96 matches for SK Brann between 1983 and 1986. He later served on the club's board of directors. After a number of years as a teacher, Terje also became principal of the local academy in Bergen in 2004. Terje died in 2013 at 52 years old after suffering a cardiac arrest during the Skjærsgårdsrittet bicycle race. Having also been a promising handball player in her youth, Vilde cites her father's coaching as inspiration for her to pursue a career in football and strive to play for the national team.

Bøe Risa has been in a relationship with Sparta Prague and Norway international footballer Andreas Vindheim since October 2013.

In May 2017, Bøe Risa graduated from the Western Norway University of Applied Sciences with a bachelor's degree in economics and administration.

== Career statistics ==
=== Club ===
As of match played 11 September 2024

Appearances and goals by club, season and competition
Club	Season	League			National cup (Note: Includes Norwegian Cup, Svenska Cupen, Women's FA Cup and Copa de la Reina)		League cup (Note: Includes FA Women's League Cup and Supercopa de España)		Continental (Note: UEFA Women's Champions League)		Total	
Club	Season	Division	Apps	Goals	Apps	Goals	Apps	Goals	Apps	Goals	Apps	Goals
Arna-Bjørnar	2012	Toppserien	16	3	3	0	—		—		19	3
Arna-Bjørnar	2013	Toppserien	18	0	3	0	—		—		21	0
Arna-Bjørnar	2014	Toppserien	22	3	2	0	—		—		22	3
Arna-Bjørnar	2015	Toppserien	22	3	2	0	—		—		24	3
Arna-Bjørnar	2016	Toppserien	22	0	2	1	—		—		22	1
Arna-Bjørnar	2017	Toppserien	0	0	0	0	—		—		0	0
Arna-Bjørnar	2018	Toppserien	21	6	3	1	—		—		24	7
Arna-Bjørnar	Total		121	15	15	2	0	0	0	0	136	17
Göteborg FC	2019	Damallsvenskan	22	2	6	1	—		1	0	29	3
Göteborg FC	2020	Damallsvenskan	15	3	2	0	—		2	1	19	4
Göteborg FC	Total		37	5	8	1	0	0	3	1	48	7
Sandviken	2021	Toppserien	3	0	0	0	—		—		3	0
Manchester United	2021–22	WSL	17	2	2	0	6	1	—		25	3
Manchester United	2022–23	WSL	12	0	3	2	4	3	—		19	5
Manchester United	Total		29	2	5	2	10	4	0	0	44	8
Atlético Madrid	2023–24	Liga F	30	1	4	1	1	0	—		35	2
Atlético Madrid	2024–25	Liga F	26	2	5	0	0	0	2	1	33	3
Atlético Madrid	Total		57	3	9	1	1	0	2	1	71	6
Career total			247	25	37	6	11	4	5	2	292	38

=== International ===
As of match played 10 July 2025

Appearances and goals by national team and year
National team	Year	Apps	Goals
Norway	2016	2	1
Norway	2017	2	0
Norway	2018	8	0
Norway	2019	16	1
Norway	2020	5	0
Norway	2021	10	0
Norway	2022	12	0
Norway	2023	14	0
Norway	2024	11	1
Norway	2025	10	1
Total		90	4

As of match played 2 July 2025
Scores and results list Norway's goal tally first, score column indicates score after each Bøe Risa goal.

List of international goals scored by Vilde Bøe Risa
No.	Date	Cap	Venue	Opponent	Score	Result	Competition
1	19 September 2016	1	Høddvoll Stadion, Ulsteinvik, Norway	Israel	4–0	5–0	UEFA Women's Euro 2017 qualifying
2	2 June 2019	19	Stade Moulonguet, Amiens, France	South Africa	1–0	7–2	Friendly
3	29 October 2024	79	Ullevaal Stadion, Oslo, Norway	Albania	9–0	9–0	UEFA Women's Euro 2025 qualifying play-offs
4	3 June 2025	87	Stade de Tourbillon, Sion, Switzerland	Switzerland	1–0	1–0	2025 UEFA Women's Nations League

== Honours ==
Kopparbergs/Göteborg FC

- Svenska Cupen: 2019
- Damallsvenskan: 2020

Manchester United

- Women's FA Cup runner-up: 2022–23

Norway

- Algarve Cup: 2019

Individual

- Primera División Team of the Year: 2024–25
