= Hayley Ladd =

Wales international footballer

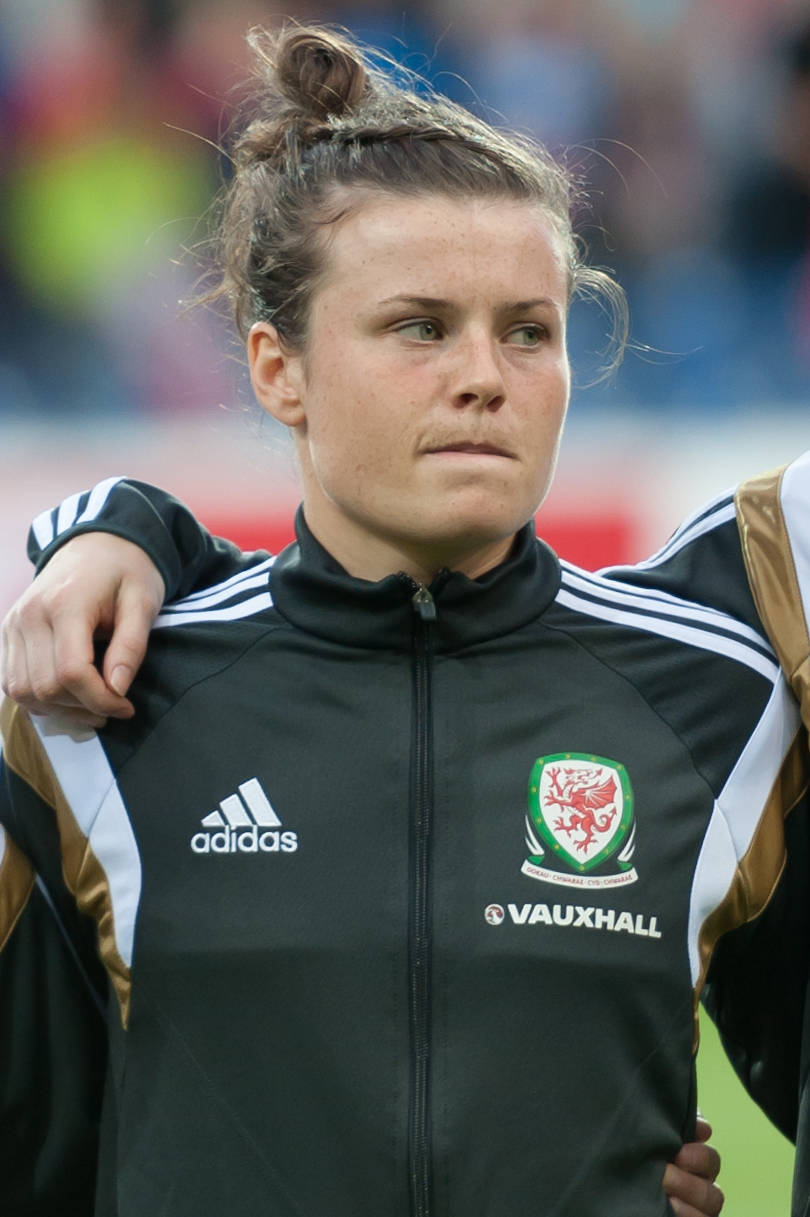
- Ladd lined up for Wales in September 2015

Personal information
- Full name: Hayley Elizabeth Ladd
- Date of birth: 6 October 1993 (age 33)
- Place of birth: Dacorum, England
- Height: 1.72 m (5 ft 8 in)
- Positions: Defender; midfielder

Team information
- Current team: Crystal Palace
- Number: 16

Youth career
- St Albans City

Senior career*
Years	Team	Apps	(Gls)
2009–2012	Arsenal	0	(0)
2012	→ Kokkola Futis 10 (loan)	12	(0)
2012–2015	Coventry City	26	(3)
2015–2017	Bristol Academy/City	35	(1)
2017–2019	Birmingham City	36	(2)
2019–2025	Manchester United	81	(9)
2025–2026	Everton	14	(0)
2026–	Crystal Palace	10	(2)

International career^{‡}
2011–	Wales	115	(3)
- * Club domestic league appearances and goals as of 26 April 2026 ‡ National team caps and goals as of 18 April 2026

Hayley Elizabeth Ladd (Welsh: [lað]; born 6 October 1993) is a professional footballer who plays as a defender or midfielder for Women's Super League club Crystal Palace. Born in England, she plays for the Wales national team.

She has previously played in England for Arsenal, Coventry City, Bristol Academy/City, Birmingham City, Manchester United and Everton, as well as a short spell in Finland with Kokkola F10.

== Club career ==
=== Early career ===
Formerly a youth at St Albans City, Ladd also trained with Arsenal's development academy having joined when she was 9 years old. In June 2012, Ladd joined Naisten Liiga club Kokkola Futis 10 on a four-month loan having struggled to break into the Arsenal team. The move was arranged by the Finnish coach of the Welsh national team, Jarmo Matikainen. It timed well with the break between the end of her A Level studies and the beginning of her degree course.

=== Coventry City ===
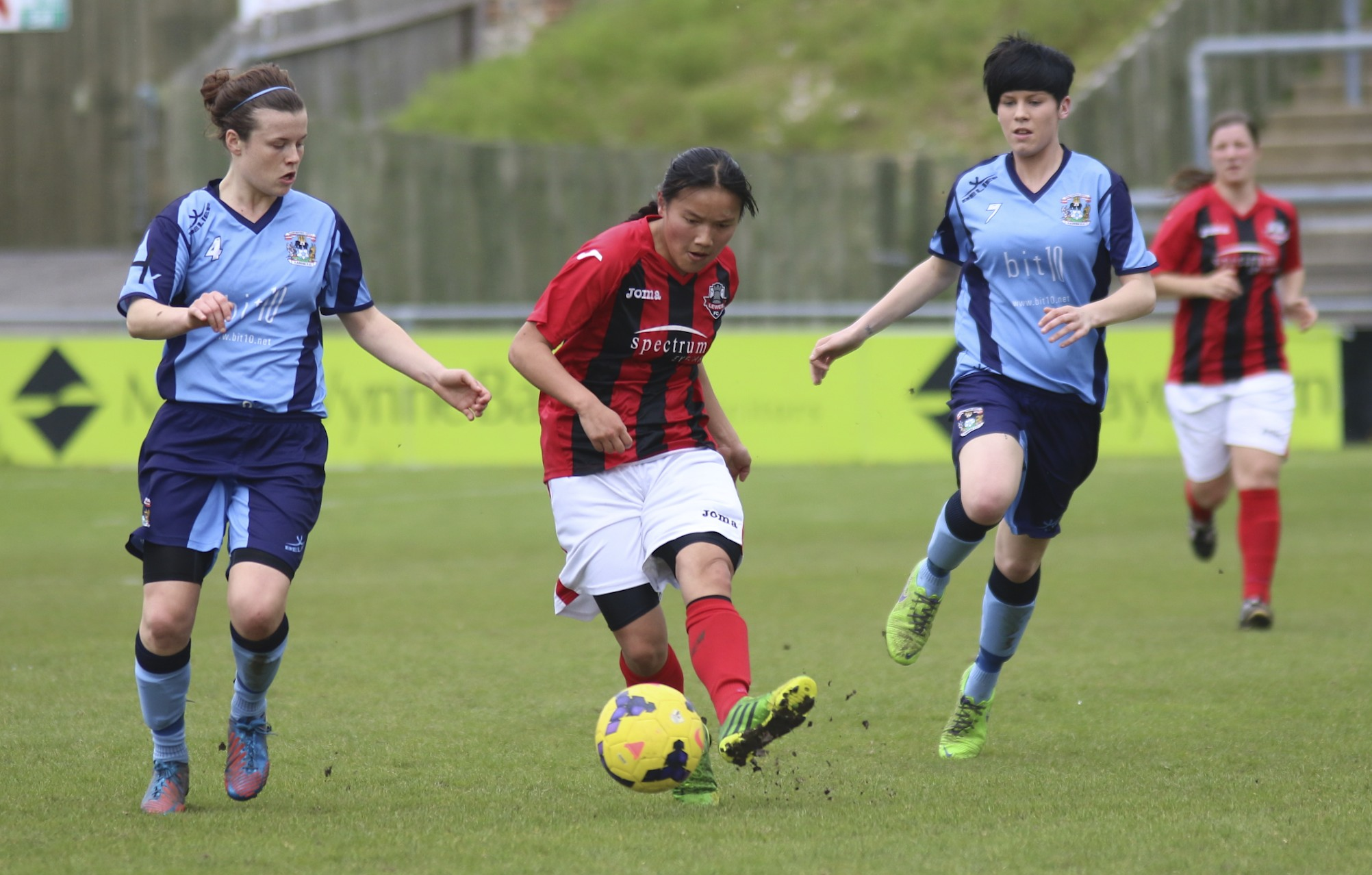
Ladd (left) playing for Coventry City in 2014.

Upon her return to the UK, Ladd joined Coventry City in the FA Women's Premier League National Division in October 2012, initially on loan, making her debut in a 2–1 defeat at Manchester City. She spent three years with the Sky Blues while pursuing a Human Biology degree at nearby Loughborough University, ending in 2015.

=== Bristol City ===
In January 2015, Ladd signed with FA WSL team Bristol Academy, later rebranded as Bristol City, where she played for three seasons.

=== Birmingham City ===
Ladd signed for Birmingham City on 31 July 2017, where she played for a further two seasons until 29 May 2019, when Ladd announced her decision to leave Birmingham City, after turning down a new contract.

=== Manchester United ===
On 5 June 2019, Ladd agreed to sign with Manchester United ahead of the team's first season in the FA WSL. Ladd made her debut for Manchester United against Manchester City in the FA WSL on 7 September 2019, a 1–0 loss in the inaugural Manchester derby. She scored her first goal for the club on 21 November 2019 in an 11–1 League Cup Group Stage victory over Championship team Leicester City. At the end of her debut season with the club she was named Manchester United Women's Player of the Year.

On 24 February 2021, Ladd signed a contract extension with Manchester United until June 2023 with the option of a further year. She signed a further extension until 2025 on 14 December 2023.

=== Everton ===
On 8 January 2025, it was announced that Ladd had signed for Everton. Ten days later, on 18 January, she made her debut for the club in a 1–1 draw against Aston Villa.

=== Crystal Palace ===
On 11 January 2026, Ladd was announced at Crystal Palace on a two and a half year contract.

== International career ==
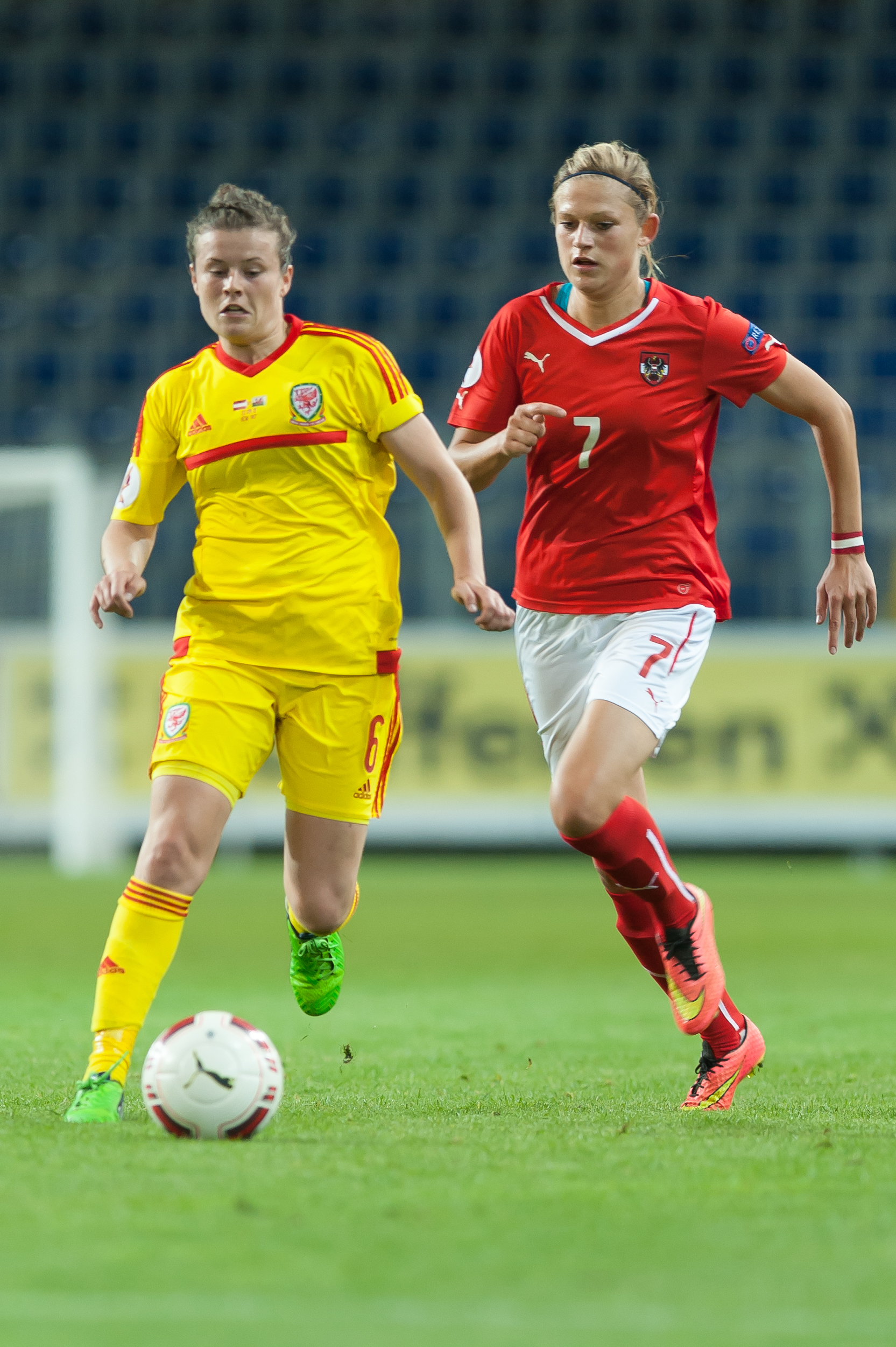
Ladd (left) playing for Wales in 2015

Ladd was eligible to play for England through being born there, but chose to represent Wales. Ladd was named on standby for the senior Wales squad for the Algarve Cup in March 2011. On 15 June 2011, Ladd won her first cap as an 87th-minute substitute for Helen Lander in a 2–0 friendly defeat to New Zealand, played in Savièse, Switzerland. Five days later Ladd featured in Wales' 3–1 defeat to Colombia.

On 8 June 2017, Ladd scored her first international goal in a friendly win over Portugal. On 24 November 2017, she scored her first competitive international goal, a free kick in a 1–0 win over Kazakhstan during 2019 World Cup qualification.

In January 2019, Ladd earned her 50th cap for Wales in a match against Italy. She was presented with a golden cap in recognition of the landmark in June 2019 by FAW Vice President Steve Williams and former men's international player Danny Gabbidon ahead of a match against New Zealand against whom she had made her senior debut 8 years prior. In 2024 she was appointed vice-captain.

In June 2025, Ladd was named in Wales' squad for UEFA Women's Euro 2025.

== Personal life ==
Ladd got engaged to her girlfriend Levi-Chambers Cook in June 2021. They married in March 2026.

== Career statistics ==
=== Club ===
As of match played 26 April 2026.

Appearances and goals by club, season and competition
Club	Season	League			FA Cup (Note: Includes the Women's FA Cup)		League Cup (Note: Includes WSL Cup/Women's League Cup and FA WPL Cup)		Europe (Note: Includes UEFA Women's Champions League)		Total	
Club	Season	Division	Apps	Goals	Apps	Goals	Apps	Goals	Apps	Goals	Apps	Goals
Arsenal	2011	WSL	0	0	0	0	3	0	0	0	3	0
Arsenal	2012	WSL	0	0	0	0	0	0	0	0	0	0
Arsenal	Total		0	0	0	0	3	0	0	0	3	0
Kokkola F10 (loan)	2012	Naisten Liiga	12	0	—		—		—		12	0
Coventry City	2012–13	WPL National	10	0	0	0	3	0	—		13	0
Coventry City	2013–14	WPL South	16	3	0	0	3	0	—		19	3
Coventry City	2014–15	WPL North	0	0	0	0	—		—		0	0
Coventry City	Total		26	3	0	0	6	0	0	0	32	3
Bristol City	2015	WSL 1	14	0	1	0	6	0	2	0	23	0
Bristol City	2016	WSL 2	13	1	2	0	0	0	—		15	1
Bristol City	2017	WSL 1	8	0	0	0	—		—		8	0
Bristol City	Total		35	1	3	0	6	0	2	0	46	1
Birmingham City	2017–18	WSL 1	17	0	1	0	4	1	—		22	1
Birmingham City	2018–19	WSL	19	2	0	0	4	0	—		23	2
Birmingham City	Total		36	2	1	0	8	1	0	0	45	3
Manchester United	2019–20	WSL	14	0	1	0	6	1	—		21	1
Manchester United	2020–21	WSL	18	1	0	0	3	0	—		21	1
Manchester United	2021–22	WSL	14	2	1	0	3	0	—		18	2
Manchester United	2022–23	WSL	21	4	4	0	2	0	—		27	4
Manchester United	2023–24	WSL	11	2	3	0	3	1	0	0	17	3
Manchester United	2024–25	WSL	3	0	0	0	3	0	—		6	0
Manchester United	Total		81	9	9	0	20	2	0	0	110	11
Everton	2024–25	WSL	9	0	2	0	0	0	—		11	0
Everton	2025–26	WSL	5	0	0	0	2	0	—		7	0
Everton	Total		14	0	2	0	2	0	0	0	18	0
Crystal Palace	2025–26	WSL 2	10	2	1	0	0	0	—		11	2
Career total			214	17	16	0	45	3	2	0	277	20

=== International ===
As of matches played 18 April 2026. Statistics from the Football Association of Wales

Appearances and goals by national team and year
National team	Year	Apps	Goals
Wales	Prior to 2012	25	1
Wales	2015	2	0
Wales	2016	6	0
Wales	2017	10	2
Wales	2018	6	0
Wales	2019	9	0
Wales	2020	5	0
Wales	2021	6	0
Wales	2022	11	0
Wales	2023	8	0
Wales	2024	11	0
Wales	2025	12	0
Wales	2026	4	0
Total		115	3

Wales score listed first, score column indicates score after each Ladd goal.

International goals by date, venue, opponent, score, result and competition
No.	Date	Venue	Opponent	Score	Result	Competition	Ref.
1	8 June 2017	Estádio do Fontelo, Viseu, Portugal	Portugal	1–0	2–1	International friendly	
2	24 November 2017	Cardiff City Stadium, Cardiff, Wales	Kazakhstan	1–0	1–0	2019 FIFA Women's World Cup qualification	

== Honours ==
Manchester United

- Women's FA Cup: 2023–24; runner-up: 2022–23

Individual

- Manchester United Women's Player of the Year: 2019–20
