= 2022–23 Women's FA Cup =

Tournament details
- Country: England; Wales
- Teams: 438

Final positions
- Champions: Chelsea (5th title)
- Runners-up: Manchester United

Tournament statistics
- Matches played: 413
- Goals scored: 2,163 (5.24 per match)
- Top goal scorer(s): Sammy Rowland (Hashtag United); 11 goals

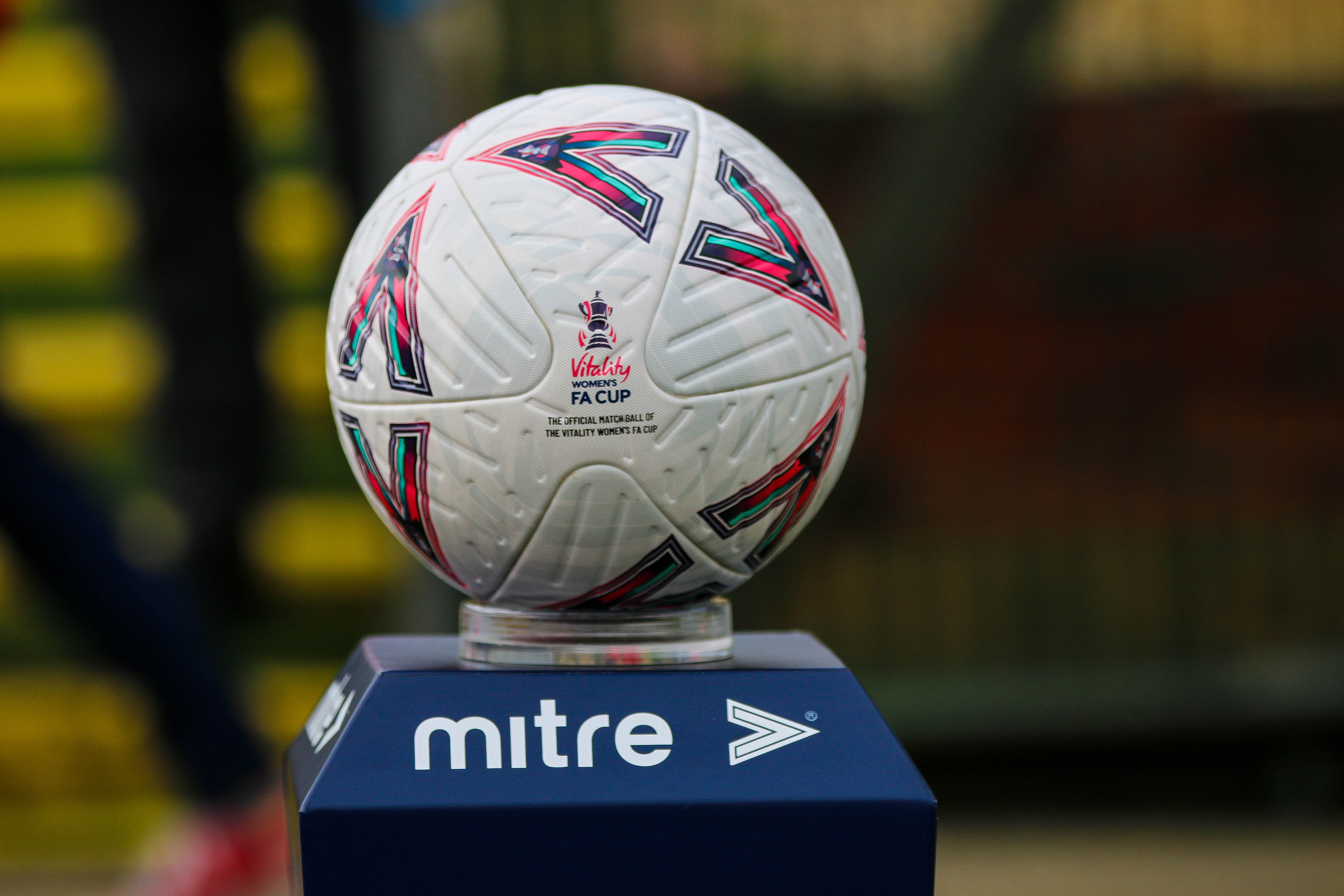
Ball with "Vitality Women's FA Cup" logo, from the Lewes–Manchester United quarter-final.

The 2022–23 Women's FA Cup was the 53rd staging of the Women's FA Cup, a knockout cup competition for women's football teams in England. Chelsea were the defending champions, having beaten Manchester City 3–2 in the 2022 final on 15 May 2022.

In March 2022, it was announced the Women's FA Cup prize fund would be increasing ahead of the 2022–23 season from around £400,000 to a combined £3 million.

The final was won by Chelsea, who beat Manchester United 1–0 at Wembley Stadium in front of a record attendance of 77,390, a world record for a women's domestic club match.

It is the first season of the competition to feature the use the VAR (Video Assistant Referee) and Goal-line Technology.

== Teams ==
A total of 438 teams were accepted into the 2022–23 Women's FA Cup, an increase of 21 from the previous year. Exemptions remained the same from the previous season: tier 5 teams are given an exemption for the first qualifying round, entering at the second round qualifying stage. The 48 teams that play in the FA Women's National League Division One (tier 4) are given exemption until third round qualifying, while teams in the Northern and Southern Premier Divisions (tier 3) will enter at the first round proper. The 12 Women's Championship teams (tier 2) are exempt until the third round proper, while the final teams to enter the competition will be the 12 Women's Super League teams (tier 1) which remain exempt until the fourth round proper.

Round	Clubs remaining	Clubs involved	Winners from previous round	Games played	Goals scored	Prize money	
Round	Clubs remaining	Clubs involved	Winners from previous round	Games played	Goals scored	Winner	Loser
First round qualifying	438	174	–	72	388	£1,800	£450
Second round qualifying	352	256 (Note: 82 Tier 5 regional premier division teams added)	86	122	712	£3,000	£750
Third round qualifying	224	176 (Note: 48 FA Women's National League Division One teams added)	128	84	445	£4,000	£1,000
First round	136	112 (Note: 24 FA Women's National League Premier Division teams added)	88	56	278	£6,000	£1,500
Second round	80	56	56	28	137	£8,000	£2,000
Third round	52	40 (Note: 12 Women's Championship teams added)	28	20	75	£10,000	£2,500
Fourth round	32	32 (Note: 12 Women's Super League teams added)	20	16	77	£15,000	£3,750
Fifth round	16	16	16	8	31	£20,000	£5,000
Quarter-final	8	8	8	4	13	£25,000	£6,250
Semi-final	4	4	4	2	6	£50,000	£12,250
Final	2	2	2	1	1	£100,000	£50,000

== First round qualifying ==
The competition started at the first round qualifying stage with 72 of the scheduled 87 games played in September 2022, made up of teams from outside the top five tiers of the women's football pyramid.

Tie	Home team (tier)	Score	Away team (tier)	Att.
1	Penrith AFC (6)	6–0	Cramlington United (7)	
2	Boro Rangers (7)	2–4	Cramlington Town (7)	
3	Guisborough Town (6)	1–5	West Allotment (6)	
4	Cullercoats (7)	0–8	Birtley Town (7)	
5	Chester Le Street United (6)	0–1	Thornaby (6)	
6	Boldon (7)	1–3	Hartlepool Pools Youth (6)	
7	Workington Reds (6)	1–1 (3–2 p)	Washington AFC (6)	
8	Darlington FC (7)	6–1	Ripon City (6)	
9	Hartlepool United (6)	0–3	CLS Amazons (7)	
10	Stanwix (7)	2–4	Gateshead Leam Rangers (7)	
11	Gateshead Rutherford (7)	3–0	Gateshead FC (6)	
12	Altofts (6)	6–0	Sheffield United Community (6)	
13	Morley Town (7)	7–0	Beverley Town (7)	
14	Harworth Colliery (6)	0–7	York Railway Institute (6)	95
15	St Joseph's Rockware of Worksop (6)	2–7	Farsley Celtic Juniors (6)	
16	Market Rasen Town (7)	H–W	Ruston Sports (7)	
Ruston Sports withdrew.
17	Thackley AFC (7)	A–W	Grimsby Town (6)	
18	Poppleton (7)	1–4	Pocklington Town (7)	
19	Grimsby Borough (6)	1–3	Brighouse Sports (7)	47
20	Sheffield Wednesday (6)	3–2	Cleethorpes Town (7)	70
21	Preston North End (6)	3–0	Atherton Laburnum Rovers (7)	
22	Macclesfield Town (7)	0–5	Warrington Wolves Foundation (6)	
23	Mancunian Unity (7)	8–0	Athletico Middleton (7)	275
24	Pilkington (7)	1–1 (2–4 p)	Sir Tom Finney FC (6)	
25	Bury FC Foundation (7)	2–3	Marine (7)	
26	Penwortham Town (6)	3–5	Altrincham (6)	
27	West Kirby (7)	A–W	Bolton Wanderers (6)	
West Kirby withdrew.
28	Bury AFC (6)	7–0	BRNESC (6)	134
29	Hindley Juniors (6)	1–1 (0–3 p)	Mossley AFC (7)	
30	Macclesfield FC (7)	A–W	Wythenshawe Amateurs (6)	
Macclesfield FC removed subject to appeal.
31	Clitheroe Wolves (7)	1–0	Nantwich Town (7)	
32	Willaston (7)	H–W	Burnley Belvedere (7)	
Burnley Belvedere withdrew.
33	Kettering Town (6)	H–W	Sleaford United (7)	
Sleaford United withdrew.
34	Dunton & Broughton United (7)	0–5	Skegness Town (7)	
35	Yaxley Phoenix (6)	2–4	Leicester City Ladies (6)	
36	Allexton & New Parks (7)	3–3 (3–1 p)	Long Buckby (7)	
37	Bugbrooke St Michaels (7)	3–2	Rugby Borough (6)	
38	Stamford AFC (7)	1–6	Asfordby Amateurs (6)	
39	Kingfisher (6)	0–1	City of Stoke FC (6)	
40	Bromsgrove Sporting (7)	0–1	Coventry City (6)	
41	Coventry Sphinx (6)	4–3	Walsall Wood (6)	
42	AFC Telford United (6)	6–0	Wyrley (6)	
43	Droitwich Spa (6)	0–0 (6–5 p)	Tamworth (6)	130
44	Norton Canes (7)	0–14	Sedgley & Gornal United (6)	

Tie	Home team (tier)	Score	Away team (tier)	Att.
45	Westfields (6)	0–7	Bewdley Town (6)	76
46	Leamington Lions (6)	3–1	Doveridge (7)	77
47	Newcastle Town (7)	2–0	Port Vale (6)	
48	Henley Athletic (7)	A–W	Sprowston (7)	
Henley Athletic withdrew.
49	Brantham Athletic (7)	A–W	Mulbarton Wanderers (7)	
Brantham Athletic withdrew.
50	Haverhill Rovers (6)	3–4	Stanway Rovers (7)	37
51	East Bergholt United (6)	0–1	Brett Vale (7)	
52	Hitchin Belles (7)	2–1	Bedmond (7)	
53	Biggleswade United (6)	1–1 (2–3 p)	Headstone Manor (7)	
54	Southend United Community SC (7)	0–1	Hertford Town (7)	
55	Frontiers (7)	1–0	AFC Dunstable (6)	
56	Harpenden Town (7)	H–W	Leigh Ramblers (7)	
Leigh Ramblers withdrew.
57	Hitchin Town (7)	N/A	Herts Vipers (7)	
Match not played. Hitchin Town and Herts Vipers both withdrew.
58	Sevenoaks Town (7)	0–6	Barking (6)	
59	Maidstone United (6)	1–5	Herne Bay (6)	
60	Comets (7)	3–4	Islington Borough (7)	
61	Regents Park Rangers (7)	3–3 (2–4 p)	Hackney (6)	
62	Hastings United (6)	H–W	Margate (7)	
Margate withdrew.
63	Welling United (6)	6–0	Glebe (7)	
64	Buckingham United (7)	1–6	Sport London e Benfica (6)	
65	Mortimer (7)	1–8	Watford Development (6)	
66	Brentford (6)	5–4	Woodley United (6)	
67	Milton United (6)	8–0	Slough Town (7)	
68	Eastbourne United (6)	H–W	Walton & Hersham (7)	
Walton & Hersham withdrew.
69	Abbey Rangers (6)	2–2 (5–6 p)	Steyning Town Community (6)	30
70	Richmond Park (6)	8–0	Reigate (7)	
71	Dorking Wanderers (6)	5–1	Richmond & Kew (7)	
72	Guildford City (7)	0–8	Leatherhead (6)	
73	Montpelier Villa (6)	2–0	Burgess Hill Town (7)	
74	Shanklin (7)	1–3	AFC Stoneham (6)	75
75	Badshot Lea (6)	H–W	Dorchester Town (7)	
Dorchester Town withdrew.
76	AFC Portchester (7)	3–0	QK Southampton (7)	
77	Rushmoor Community (6)	H–W	New Milton Town (6)	
78	Gloucester City (7)	2–2 (2–4 p)	Bishop's Cleeve (7)	110
79	Pen Mill (7)	10–0	Longwell Green (7)	
80	Frome Town (6)	2–2 (6–7 p)	Weston Super Mare (6)	100
81	St Vallier (6)	1–1 (3–4 p)	Pucklechurch Sports (6)	27
82	Frampton Rangers (6)	2–2 (6–5 p)	Oldland Abbotonians (6)	
83	Bideford (6)	3–6	Activate (6)	
84	Marine Academy Plymouth (6)	6–1	Teignmouth (7)	
85	Helston Athletic (7)	16–2	Crediton United (7)	29
86	Axminster Town (7)	A–W	Barnstaple Town (7)	
Axminster Town withdrew.
87	Sticker (6)	9–0	Budleigh Salterton (6)	45

== Second round qualifying ==
122 of the 128 scheduled matches were played in the second round qualifying in October 2022, including the introduction of teams from the fifth-tier regional first division football leagues.

Tie	Home team (tier)	Score	Away team (tier)	Att.
1	Darlington FC (7)	2–2 (5–3 p)	Blyth Town (5)	
2	West Allotment (6)	0–7	South Shields (5)	
3	Birtley Town (7)	0–2	Consett (7)	
4	Gateshead Rutherford (7)	2–0	Carlisle United (6)	
5	Wallsend BC (5)	2–0	Bishop Auckland (6)	
6	Sunderland West End (5)	2–4	Penrith AFC (6)	
7	Gateshead Leam Rangers (7)	1–5	Redcar Town (5)	
8	CLS Amazons (7)	5–0	Cramlington Town (7)	
9	Ponteland United (7)	3–0	Workington Reds (6)	
10	Chester-Le-Street Town (5)	9–0	Hartlepool Pools Youth (6)	
11	Thornaby (6)	1–9	Alnwick Town (5)	
12	Brighouse Sports (7)	2–0	Harrogate Town (5)	
13	York Railway Institute (6)	1–2	Oughtibridge War Memorial (5)	
14	Farsley Celtic Juniors (6)	7–0	Bradford Park Avenue (6)	
15	Retford (7)	0–4	Dronfield Town (6)	
16	Ossett United (6)	4–1	Millmoor Juniors (6)	
17	Rotherham United (5)	0–2	Altofts (6)	
18	HBW United (7)	0–7	Wakefield (5)	
19	Sheffield Wednesday (6)	0–6	Morley Town (7)	
20	Chesterfield (5)	10–0	Pocklington Town (7)	
21	Hull United (5)	7–0	Grimsby Town (6)	
22	Market Rasen Town (7)	H–W	Farsley Celtic Women (7)	
Farsley Celtic Women withdrew.
23	Ashton Town Lionesses (7)	1–5	Mossley Hill (5)	
24	West Didsbury & Chorlton (5)	15–0	Sandbach United (7)	
25	Wythenshawe Amateurs (6)	1–5	FC United of Manchester (5)	87
26	Accrington Stanley (6)	3–0	Mossley AFC (7)	
27	Northwich Vixens (6)	2–2 (6–7 p)	Darwen (5)	
28	Willaston (7)	1–21	Curzon Ashton (5)	
29	Warrington Wolves Foundation (6)	2–2 (4–2 p)	Altrincham (6)	
30	Marine (7)	3–4	Bury AFC (6)	
31	Bolton Wanderers (6)	4–1	Sir Tom Finney FC (6)	
32	Tranmere Rovers (5)	6–1	Mancunian Unity (7)	
33	Blackburn Community (5)	3–1	Chester (6)	
34	Fleetwood Town Wrens (5)	12–1	Clitheroe Wolves (7)	
35	Cheadle Town Stingers (5)	4–1	Blackpool (6)	
36	Salford City Lionesses (5)	2–3	Crewe Alexandra (5)	
37	FC St Helens (7)	0–6	Preston North End (6)	
38	Sherwood (6)	1–0	Rugby Town (6)	
39	Thrapston Town (6)	2–5	Arnold Eagles (5)	
40	Lincoln United (5)	4–3	Anstey Nomads (5)	
41	Desborough (7)	0–5	Kettering Town (6)	
42	Notts County (5)	1–1 (3–4 p)	Basford United (5)	
43	Skegness Town (7)	5–0	Coalville Town Ravenettes (6)	
44	Nottingham Trent University (6)	4–0	Allexton & New Parks (7)	
45	Leicester City Ladies (6)	8–0	Borrowash Victoria (7)	
46	Asfordby Amateurs (6)	13–0	Kirby Muxloe (7)	
47	Mansfield Town (5)	8–1	Bugbrooke St Michaels (7)	
48	Newcastle Town (7)	5–0	Droitwich Spa (6)	
49	Leamington Lions (6)	0–1	Sutton Coldfield Town (5)	
50	Burton Albion (5)	6–0	Bewdley Town (6)	
51	Worcester City (5)	8–1	City of Stoke FC (6)	
52	Walsall FC (6)	0–4	Solihull Sporting (5)	
53	Kidderminster Harriers (5)	2–3	Coventry Sphinx (6)	
54	Crusaders (5)	0–4	Shifnal Town (6)	
55	Lye Town (5)	H–W	Bedworth United (7)	
Bedworth United withdrew.
56	Shrewsbury Town (5)	8–1	Coventry City (6)	
57	Sedgley & Gornal United (6)	4–2	Hereford Pegasus (7)	
58	Knowle (6)	3–2	Coundon Court (5)	
59	Redditch United (5)	0–4	Redditch Borough (7)	
60	Lichfield City (5)	5–1	AFC Telford United (6)	
61	Stanway Rovers (7)	1–5	Mulbarton Wanderers (7)	
62	Fakenham Town (6)	3–2	Beccles Town (7)	
63	Lawford (6)	1–4	Wroxham (5)	
64	Bungay Town (7)	0–10	AFC Sudbury (5)	
65	Sprowston (7)	2–2 (6–5 p)	Brett Vale (7)	

Tie	Home team (tier)	Score	Away team (tier)	Att.
66	Histon (7)	1–6	Needham Market (5)	
67	St Ives Town (6)	4–1	Newmarket Town (6)	
68	Thetford Town (7)	1–4	King's Lynn Town (5)	
69	Bowers & Pitsea (5)	3–2	Stevenage (5)	
70	Chelmsford City (7)	2–2 (3–4 p)	Harpenden Town (7)	
71	Hitchin Town (7) or Herts Vipers (7)	A–W	Hitchin Belles (7)	
Hitchin Town and Herts Vipers withdrew from the previous round.
72	Cheshunt (6)	0–5	Bedford (5)	
73	Wootton Blue Cross (6)	3–5	Colney Heath (5)	
74	Headstone Manor (7)	8–0	Frontiers (7)	
75	Wodson Park (6)	0–7	Luton Town (5)	
76	Royston Town (5)	3–0	Hertford Town (7)	151
77	Harlow Town (5)	H–W	Garston (7)	
Garston withdrew.
78	Bromley (6)	0–9	Millwall Lionesses (5)	669
79	Islington Borough (7)	0–4	Dartford (5)	31
80	Hackney (6)	3–0	Bexhill United (6)	
81	Sittingbourne (7)	1–3	Clapton Community (6)	
82	Enfield Town (5)	H–W	Edgware & Kingsbury (7)	
Edgware & Kingsbury withdrew.
83	Ebbsfleet United (5)	4–3	Barking (6)	138
84	Tunbridge Wells Foresters (7)	1–7	Dulwich Hamlet (5)	
85	Cray Valley (PM) (6)	2–6	Herne Bay (6)	
86	Ashford United (6)	15–0	Borough Green (7)	
87	Aylesford (5)	3–1	Welling United (6)	
88	Hastings United (6)	2–1	Haringey Borough (5)	
89	Abingdon Town (5)	3–3 (5–3 p)	Oxford City (5)	
90	Caversham United (6)	1–3	Eversley & California (6)	
91	Tilehurst Panthers (7)	1–2	Long Crendon (6)	
92	Wycombe Wanderers (5)	3–2	Sport London e Benfica (6)	
93	Abingdon United (5)	5–0	Brentford (6)	
94	Watford Development (6)	0–1	Penn & Tylers Green (6)	
95	Milton United (6)	1–3	Ascot United (5)	
96	Richmond Park (6)	2–0	Steyning Town Community (6)	
97	Woking (6)	6–0	Seaford Town (7)	
98	Ashmount Leigh (7)	0–3	Sutton United (5)	
99	AFC Acorns (5)	10–0	Saltdean United (5)	
100	Eastbourne United (6)	1–3	Dorking Wanderers (6)	
101	Leatherhead (6)	0–6	Worthing (5)	
102	Whyteleafe (6)	3–2	Montpelier Villa (6)	
103	Newhaven (6)	0–5	Fulham (5)	
104	AFC Portchester (7)	2–3	Badshot Lea (6)	
105	Widbrook United (7)	2–7	Poole Town (5)	
106	United Services Portsmouth (7)	0–2	Eastleigh In The Community (5)	
107	Sherborne Town (5)	1–1 (1–3 p)	Winchester City Flyers (5)	
108	AFC Stoneham (6)	3–2	Rushmoor Community (6)	
109	Shaftesbury (7)	1–3	Warminster Town (5)	
110	Fleet Town (7)	0–4	Weymouth (6)	
111	Pagham (7)	0–12	Bournemouth Sports (5)	
112	Middlezoy Rovers (6)	0–6	Royal Wootton Bassett Town (5)	
113	Chipping Sodbury Town (6)	0–6	Frampton Rangers (6)	
114	AEK Boco (6)	3–0	Bishop's Cleeve (7)	
115	Tuffley Rovers (7)	0–2	Paulton Rovers (6)	93
116	Bristol & West (7)	0–13	Bristol Rovers (5)	
117	Pen Mill (7)	1–5	Pucklechurch Sports (6)	
118	SGS Olveston United (6)	2–4	Stockwood Wanderers (6)	
119	Forest Green Rovers (5)	8–0	Weston Super Mare (6)	
120	FC Chippenham (7)	A–W	Downend Flyers (6)	
FC Chippenham withdrew.
121	Helston Athletic (7)	0–1	Marine Academy Plymouth (6)	
122	Halwill (7)	3–4	Signal Box Oak Villa (7)	
123	Feniton (6)	1–9	Torquay United (5)	
124	Bradninch (7)	0–14	Bishops Lydeard (5)	
125	Activate (6)	1–3	Barnstaple Town (7)	
126	Sticker (6)	2–1	Ilminster Town (5)	
127	Bodmin (7)	2–5	Saltash United (6)	
128	Seaton Town (7)	1–5	Liskeard Athletic (5)	

== Third round qualifying ==
84 of the 88 scheduled matches were played in the third round qualifying in October 2022, including the introduction of 48 teams from the fourth-tier FA Women's National League Division One.

Tie	Home team (tier)	Score	Away team (tier)	Att.
1	York City (4)	3–0	Ponteland United (7)	
2	Darwen (5)	3–1	Bury AFC (6)	
3	Newcastle United (4)		Gateshead Rutherford (7)	
Newcastle United originally won 12–0 but the match was ordered to be replayed following a rule breach.
4	Chester-Le-Street Town (5)	1–1 (3–4 p)	Cheadle Town Stingers (5)	
5	South Shields (5)	1–5	Leeds United (4)	
6	Redcar Town (5)	3–2	Ossett United (6)	
7	Wakefield (5)	1–5	Hull City (4)	93
8	Hull United (5)	0–1	Consett (7)	
9	Warrington Wolves Foundation (6)	7–3	Farsley Celtic Juniors (6)	
10	Bolton Wanderers (6)	2–2 (1–4 p)	Penrith AFC (6)	
11	West Didsbury & Chorlton (5)	1–3	FC United of Manchester (5)	147
12	Brighouse Sports (7)	0–7	Merseyrail (4)	
13	Middlesbrough (4)	12–0	Darlington FC (7)	223
14	Alnwick Town (5)	3–1	Chorley (4)	50
15	Stockport County (4)	3–1	Altofts (6)	
16	Curzon Ashton (5)	1–1 (2–4 p)	Norton & Stockton Ancients (4)	
17	Blackburn Community (5)	0–6	Barnsley (4)	
18	Fleetwood Town Wrens (5)	3–0	CLS Amazons (7)	
19	Bradford City (4)	2–0	Preston North End (6)	
20	Durham Cestria (4)	6–0	Mossley Hill (5)	50
21	Accrington Stanley (6)	3–3 (3–4 p)	Tranmere Rovers (5)	
22	Wallsend BC (5)	2–0	Morley Town (7)	35
23	Newcastle Town (7)	0–11	Stourbridge (4)	580
24	Redditch Borough (7)	1–3	Coventry Sphinx (6)	
25	Market Rasen Town (7)	0–8	Shrewsbury Town (5)	
26	Lincoln United (5)	A–W	Northampton Town (4)	105
Lincoln United originally won 7–0 but were later removed from the competition for fielding an ineligible player.
27	Lincoln City (4)	1–3	Sheffield (4)	
28	Long Eaton United (4)	0–6	Leafield Athletic (4)	
29	Wem Town (4)	1–0	Chesterfield (5)	
30	Doncaster Rovers Belles (4)	7–1	Leicester City Ladies (6)	205
31	Crewe Alexandra (5)	8–0	Sherwood (6)	
32	Sutton Coldfield Town (5)	1–1 (5–4 p)	Shifnal Town (6)	
33	Dronfield Town (6)	1–0	Kettering Town (6)	
34	Burton Albion (4)	2–4	Lichfield City (5)	35
35	Asfordby Amateurs (6)	2–0	Skegness Town (7)	
36	Worcester City (5)	2–1	Solihull Sporting (5)	
37	Oughtibridge War Memorial (5)	7–1	Nottingham Trent University (6)	
38	Basford United (5)	1–2	Sedgley & Gornal United (6)	
39	Peterborough United (4)	3–1	Mansfield Town (5)	157
40	Solihull Moors (4)	7–0	Arnold Eagles (5)	31
41	Sporting Khalsa (4)	3–0	Leek Town (4)	35
42	Lye Town (5)	6–0	Knowle (6)	
43	Harpenden Town (7)	0–2	Needham Market (5)	
44	Norwich City (4)	4–1	Cambridge United (4)	252
45	London Seaward (4)	8–0	St Ives Town (6)	44

Tie	Home team (tier)	Score	Away team (tier)	Att.
46	Colney Heath (5)	1–0	Cambridge City (4)	
47	Fakenham Town (6)	3–4	Hackney (6)	
48	Royston Town (5)	12–1	Sprowston (7)	186
49	Mulbarton Wanderers (7)	H–W	Wymondham Town (4)	
Wymondham Town withdrew.
50	King's Lynn Town (5)	H–W	Hitchin Belles (7)	
Hitchin Belles withdrew.
51	Bedford (5)	0–7	Hashtag United (4)	
52	Harlow Town (5)	1–1 (4–5 p)	Bowers & Pitsea (5)	
53	Luton Town (5)	4–1	AFC Sudbury (5)	
54	Wroxham (5)	0–3	Enfield Town (4)	
55	Abingdon United (5)	2–2 (4–5 p)	Southampton Women (4)	
56	Ashford United (6)	4–0	Headstone Manor (7)	
57	Millwall Lionesses (5)	7–0	Long Crendon (6)	
58	Wycombe Wanderers (5)	3–4	Aylesford (5)	
59	Chesham United	5–0	Penn & Tylers Green (6)	138
60	Queens Park Rangers (4)	1–7	AFC Wimbledon (4)	
61	Herne Bay (6)	1–2	Sutton United (5)	
62	Fulham (5)	3–2	Maidenhead United (4)	90
63	Dorking Wanderers (6)	0–1	Selsey (4)	
64	Dulwich Hamlet (5)	3–0	Winchester City Flyers (5)	
65	Ascot United (5)	5–0	AFC Acorns (5)	
66	Woking (6)	0–5	Dartford (5)	
67	Hounslow (4)	1–8	Clapton Community (6)	140
68	Moneyfields (4)	2–0	Hastings United (6)	
69	AFC Stoneham (6)	1–1 (3–2 p)	Eversley & California (6)	
70	Whyteleafe (6)	0–3	Ebbsfleet United (5)	
71	Actonians (4)	4–1	Ashford Town (Middlesex) (4)	50
72	Abingdon Town (5)	6–2	Badshot Lea (6)	
73	Richmond Park (6)	1–8	Worthing (5)	
74	Sticker (6)	1–7	Portishead Town (4)	63
75	Eastleigh In The Community (5)	9–1	Signal Box Oak Villa (7)	162
76	Swindon Town (4)	10–0	Paulton Rovers (6)	720
77	Warminster Town (5)	3–2	Bristol Rovers (5)	154
78	Barnstaple Town (7)	0–7	Pucklechurch Sports (6)	
79	Frampton Rangers (6)	1–0	AFC St Austell (4)	
80	Poole Town (4)	0–2	Weymouth (6)	
81	Keynsham Town (4)	3–1	Larkhall Athletic (4)	56
82	Marine Academy Plymouth (6)	0–2	Bishops Lydeard (5)	
83	Downend Flyers (6)	0–10	Cardiff City (4)	
84	AFC Bournemouth (4)	5–1	Forest Green Rovers (5)	
85	Saltash United (6)	0–12	Exeter City (4)	
86	Torquay United (5)	5–2	Royal Wootton Bassett Town (5)	
87	Liskeard Athletic (5)	11–2	Stockwood Wanderers (6)	
88	Bournemouth Sports (5)	6–0	AEK Boco (6)	

== First round proper ==
56 matches were played in the first round proper on 13 November 2022, made up of the 88 winning teams from the third round qualifying and including the introduction of 24 from teams the third-tier FA Women's National League Premier Division.

Number of teams per tier still in competition
Super League	Championship	Premier Division	Division One	Regional & County	Total
12 / 12	12 / 12	24 / 24	35 / 35	53 / 53	136 / 136

13 November 2022	Abingdon Town (5)	0–4	Portsmouth (3)	Marcham
		Report	Quirk 26', 43'; Barrett 70'; Rolf 90'	Stadium: The Marcham Centre; Attendance: 297

13 November 2022	AFC Stoneham (6)	0–3	Actonians (4)	Southampton
		Report	Ebine 19' (pen.), 77'; Netschova 29'	Stadium: Stoneham Lane Complex

13 November 2022	Alnwick Town (5)	1–4	AFC Fylde (5)	Alnwick
	86'	Report	Binks 1'; Forster 7'; Smith 11'; Hollinshead 29'	Stadium: St James' Park (3); Attendance: 118

13 November 2022	Asfordby Amateurs (6)	3–5 (a.e.t.)	Lichfield City (5)	Asfordby Hill
	Goal	Report	Goal	Stadium: Holwell Sports Club

13 November 2022	Aylesford (5)	1–3	Dulwich Hamlet (5)	Aylesford
	Beeput 6'	Report	Saylor 44'; Monkman 63', 89'	Stadium: Cobdown Sports & Social Club

13 November 2022	Billericay Town (3)	12–0	King's Lynn Town (5)	Billericay
	Rushen 11', 60', 72', 81'; McLean 16', 90'; King 55'; Parker 57'; O'Shea 61'; Blackie 64'; Turner 65'; Thomas 69'	Report		Stadium: New Lodge

13 November 2022	Bishops Lydeard (5)	0–1	Liskeard Athletic (5)	Bishops Lydeard
		Report	Goal	Stadium: Darby Way; Attendance: 408

13 November 2022	Bournemouth Sports (5)	5–0	Pucklechurch Sports (6)	Bournemouth
	Eden 42'; Shaw 51'; Miles 77'; Mosle 90'	Report		Stadium: Chapel Gate

13 November 2022	Bowers & Pitsea (5)	2–0	Needham Market (5)	Pitsea
	Locke 13'; Sillitoe 71'	Report		Stadium: Crown Avenue

13 November 2022	Cardiff City (4)	4–0	Bridgwater United (3)	Cardiff
	L. Williams 20'; Bartlett 52'; Aadland 76'; Sargent 80'	Report		Stadium: Ocean Park Arena; Attendance: 120; Referee: Simon Laraway

13 November 2022	Cheadle Town Stingers (5)	2–2 (a.e.t.) (2–1 p)	York City (4)	Cheadle
	Dunlop 4', 81'	Report	Jones 11'; Hughes 39'	Stadium: Park Road Stadium; Attendance: 46
	Penalties
	Penalty missed Penalty scored		Penalty scored Penalty missed

13 November 2022	Clapton Community (6)	1–2	Ashford United (6)	Forest Gate
	Lyons 65'	Report	Howard 60'; Cain 87'	Stadium: The Old Spotted Dog Ground; Attendance: 460

13 November 2022	Colney Heath (5)	1–10	Hashtag United (4)	Colney Heath
	Thornton 70'	Report	Rowland 10', 28', 32', 34', 77'; Gille 18', 38'; Weathall 80', 86', 88'	Stadium: Recreation Ground

13 November 2022	Consett (7)	2–1	Warrington Wolves Foundation (6)	Consett
	Hewett 22'; McEvoy 47'	Report	64'	Stadium: Belle View Stadium; Attendance: 343

13 November 2022	Dartford (5)	2–2 (a.e.t.) (8–7 p)	Ascot United (5)	Dartford
	Davis 34'; Griffiths 47'	Report	Luckhurst-McCord 21', 50'	Stadium: Princes Park; Attendance: 233
	Penalties
	Penalty scored		Penalty scored Penalty missed

13 November 2022	Darwen (5)	1–5	Barnsley (4)	Darwen
	45'	Report	Foye; Gompertz; Marsden; Millard; Csomor	Stadium: Anchor Ground; Attendance: 106

13 November 2022	Doncaster Rovers Belles (4)	0–3	Huddersfield Town (3)	Moorends
		Report	Elford 5'; Housley 45'; Heslam 67'	Stadium: Iqbal Poultry Welfare Ground; Attendance: 337

13 November 2022	Ebbsfleet United (5)	1–2 (a.e.t.)	Southampton Women (4)	Northfleet
	Russ 34'	Report	Okoro 67'; Kilby 120+5'	Stadium: Stonebridge Road; Attendance: 200

13 November 2022	Exeter City (4)	4–2	AFC Bournemouth (4)	Exeter
	Watkins 45', 90'; Toogood 61'; Markham 70'	Report	Everson 74'; Albuery 86'	Stadium: Exwick Sports Hub

13 November 2022	FC United of Manchester (5)	1–4	Merseyrail (4)	Moston
	Chambers 75'	Report	Cloy 11', 44'; Carlin 89'; Grimes 90+4'	Stadium: Broadhurst Park; Attendance: 172

13 November 2022	Fleetwood Town Wrens (5)	1–5	Liverpool Feds (3)	Thornton-Cleveleys
	Slater 22'	Report	Thomas 28'; Douglas 44'; Stewart 50'; Dykes 60'; James 70'	Stadium: Poolfoot Farm

13 November 2022	Hackney (6)	0–4	London Bees (3)	Walthamstow
		Report	Adebowale; Beaufort; Puddefoot; Whinnett	Stadium: Douglas Eyre Sports Hub

13 November 2022	Hull City (3)	1–2 (a.e.t.)	Newcastle United (4)	Barton-upon-Humber
	Ackroyd 80'	Report	Gibson 65'; Ferguson 104'	Stadium: Easy Buy Stadium; Attendance: 501

13 November 2022	Leeds United (4)	1–1 (a.e.t.) (1–0 p)	Brighouse Town (3)	Tadcaster
	Brown 87' (pen.)	Report	Harris 78'	Stadium: Global Stadium; Attendance: 173
	Penalties
	Danby (penalty missed); Hindle (penalty missed); Brown (penalty missed); Bass (penalty scored)		Harris (penalty missed); Clayton (penalty missed); Dean (penalty missed); Kemp (penalty missed); Sowerby (penalty missed)

13 November 2022	Loughborough Lightning (3)	3–0	Sheffield (4)	Loughborough
	Robinson 10'; Stevens 20'; Russell 64'	Report		Stadium: Loughborough University Stadium

13 November 2022	Luton Town (5)	0–7	Ipswich Town (3)	Barton-le-Clay
		Report	Thomas 5', 63'; Grey 14'; Boswell 66'; Lafayette 71'; Biggs 83', 88'	Stadium: Sharpenhoe Road; Attendance: 204

13 November 2022	Lye Town (5)	1–4	Wem Town (4)	Lye
	4'	Report	Bebbington; Doster; Hunt; Pasco	Stadium: The Sports Ground

13 November 2022	Middlesbrough (4)	2–1	Bradford City (4)	Stockton-on-Tees
	Dawson 43'; Rodgers 90'	Report	Watkins 72'	Stadium: MAP Group Stadium; Attendance: 331

13 November 2022	Millwall Lionesses (5)	2–2 (a.e.t.) (5–4 p)	Gillingham (3)	Rotherhithe
	Keogh 31'; Jellett 101'	Report	Espinosa 20'; 120'	Stadium: St. Paul's Sports Ground; Attendance: 184
	Penalties
	Penalty scored		Penalty scored Penalty missed

13 November 2022	Milton Keynes Dons (3)	8–1	Mulbarton Wanderers (7)	Wootton
	Pepper 5'; Coupar 10', 11', 27'; Wood 45', 55'; Mitchell 65'; McLean 82'	Report	Jermy 84'	Stadium: Weston Park

13 November 2022	Moneyfields (4)	2–3 (a.e.t.)	Crawley Wasps (3)	Portsmouth
	Wilson-Wilton 45+4'; Simmonds 55'	Report	Nicholls 47' (pen.); Buyukgiray 81', 106'	Stadium: PMC Stadium; Attendance: 110

13 November 2022	Northampton Town (4)	6–2	Dronfield Town (6)	Harpole
	Reboul 1', 55'; Farrow 9', 61'; Dicks 11'; G. Williams 86'	Report	Goal	Stadium: Harpole Playing Field; Attendance: 135

13 November 2022	Norton & Stockton Ancients (4)	1–4	Durham Cestria (4)	Stockton-on-Tees
	29'	Report	Turnbull 9', 64'; Burn 56'; Nicholson 90'	Stadium: Norton Sports Complex; Attendance: 104

13 November 2022	Norwich City (4)	2–0	Enfield Town (4)	Horsford
	Smith 73'; Todd 89'	Report		Stadium: The Nest; Attendance: 246

13 November 2022	Oughtibridge War Memorial (5)	0–6	Nottingham Forest (3)	Oughtibridge
		Report	Taylor; Daniels 19', 58'; Mosby 40', 51'; Hewitt 66'	Stadium: Oughtibridge War Memorial Sports Ground; Attendance: 400

13 November 2022	Oxford United (3)	6–1	Chesham United (4)	Marston
	Johns 7', 28'; Swaby 30'; Stevens 52'; Wynne 87'; McLachlan 90+1'	Report	Fraser 9'	Stadium: Court Palace Farm

13 November 2022	Peterborough United (4)	2–1 (a.e.t.)	Stourbridge (4)	Bourne
	Connor 44'; Perkins 92'	Report	Fishwick 78'	Stadium: Abbey Lawn; Attendance: 232

13 November 2022	Plymouth Argyle (3)	4–2	Cheltenham Town (3)	Plymouth
	Wilson 17', 90'; Ireland 19'; Cunnigham 58'	Report	Cook 80'; Wathan 90'	Stadium: Haye Road; Attendance: 176; Referee: Gareth Jones

13 November 2022	Portishead Town (4)	2–0	Eastleigh (5)	Almondsbury
	Holloway 42'; Strippel 89' (pen.)	Report		Stadium: The Field

13 November 2022	Royston Town (5)	2–3 (a.e.t.)	London Seaward (4)	Royston
	Croucher 38'; Smith 90+7'	Report	Long 22', 115'; Lanza 77'	Stadium: Garden Walk; Attendance: 243

13 November 2022	Sedgley & Gornal United (6)	0–5	Solihull Moors (4)
		Report	Edwards; Highway; Rogers; Ross-Baker	Attendance: 123

13 November 2022	Selsey (4)	1–5	AFC Wimbledon (4)	Selsey
	Wild 25'	Report	Dorey 44', 55'; Hinks 45', 81', 90'	Stadium: Seal Bay Resort Stadium; Attendance: 65

13 November 2022	Shrewsbury Town (5)	2–8	Wolverhampton Wanderers (3)	Shrewsbury
	Jones 24'; Rimmer 72'	Report	Gauntlett 9'; Merrick 20'; Dermody 27'; Hughes 29', 70', 88'; Morphet 41', 74'	Stadium: Community Pitch; Attendance: 250

13 November 2022	Sporting Khalsa (4)	2–1	Boldmere St Michaels (3)	Willenhall
	Austin-Short 78'; Hall 90'	Report	Bickley 38'	Stadium: Guardian Warehousing Arena; Attendance: 60

13 November 2022	Stockport County (4)	7–3	Penrith AFC (6)	Stockport
	Figueiredo 7', 75', 81'; Douglas 40', 70'; Rathburn 46'; Houghton 85'	Report	Jayne 10', 18'; Forster 20'	Stadium: Stockport Sports Village; Attendance: 75

13 November 2022	Stoke City (3)	1–1 (a.e.t.) (3–2 p)	Derby County (3)	Stoke-on-Trent
	Hall 4'	Report	Gaspar 90'	Stadium: Emerys Stadium; Attendance: 154
	Penalties
	Penalty scored Penalty missed		(penalty scored) Sims; (penalty scored) Sutherland

13 November 2022	Sutton Coldfield Town (5)	1–1 (a.e.t.) (6–5 p)	Leafield Athletic (4)	Sutton Coldfield
	40' (pen.)	Report	Chase 70'	Stadium: Coles Lane; Attendance: 75
	Penalties
	Penalty scored		Penalty scored Penalty missed

13 November 2022	Swindon Town (4)	3–0	Frampton Rangers (6)	Fairford
	Donnelly 12'; Bent 57'; Colston 67'	Report		Stadium: Sem Stadium; Attendance: 88

13 November 2022	Tranmere Rovers (5)	0–9	Burnley (3)	Ellesmere Port
		Report	Willis 1'; Ravening 14', 37'; Greenhalgh 29', 38', 55'; May 42'; Kelly 75'; Embley 88'	Stadium: Ellesmere Port Sports Village

13 November 2022	Wallsend Boys Club (5)	1–2	Redcar Town (5)	Wallsend
	Goal	Report	Goal	Stadium: Kirkley Park; Attendance: 52

13 November 2022	Warminster Town (5)	0–2	Torquay United (5)	Warminster
		Report	Preston 16'; Bishop 66'	Stadium: Weymouth Street

13 November 2022	Watford (3)	7–1	Fulham (5)	Ruislip
	Wilson 7', 38'; Fyfe 33', 60'; Davison 79'; Baptiste 86', 89'	Report	Hayman 75'	Stadium: Grosvenor Vale

13 November 2022	West Bromwich Albion (3)	4–0	Crewe Alexandra (5)	Hednesford
	Mahmood 22' (pen.), 40'; Timms 67'; Stafford 82' (o.g.)	Report		Stadium: Keys Park; Attendance: 100

13 November 2022	Weymouth (6)	0–5	Keynsham Town (4)	Weymouth
		Report	Goal	Stadium: Bob Lucas Stadium

13 November 2022	Worcester City (5)	3–4	Coventry Sphinx (6)	Worcester
	Harrad 4'; Fassnidge 8', 53'	Report	12'; 45'; 69' (pen.); 103'	Stadium: Claines Lane; Attendance: 309

13 November 2022	Worthing (5)	8–0	Sutton United (5)	Worthing
	Humphrey 20'; Russell 36'; Bell 41', 78'; Newman 43', 49'; Tibble 82', 87'	Report		Stadium: Crucial Environmental Stadium

== Second round proper ==
28 matches were played in the second round proper on 27 November 2022, made up of the 56 winning teams from the first round proper and not including the introduction of any new teams. The draw was made on 14 November 2022.

Number of teams per tier still in competition
Super League	Championship	Premier Division	Division One	Regional & County	Total
12 / 12	12 / 12	19 / 24	23 / 35	14 / 53	80 / 136

27 November 2022	AFC Fylde (3)	5–4	Middlesbrough (4)	Warton
	McCoy 12'; Hignett 84'; Young 89', 114'; 117' (o.g.)	Report	Dawson 14', 90', 101'; Whitaker 65'	Stadium: Kellamergh Park; Attendance: 75

27 November 2022	AFC Wimbledon (4)	2–0	Billericay Town (3)	Carshalton
	Hinks 13'; Donovan 90'	Report		Stadium: War Memorial Sports Ground; Attendance: 261

27 November 2022	Ashford United (6)	1–3	Actonians (4)	Ashford
	Cain 10'	Report	Ledezma-Viso 48'; Shakes 77'; Kanno 87'	Stadium: Homelands Stadium; Attendance: 200

27 November 2022	Bournemouth Sports (5)	3–2	Torquay United (5)	Bournemouth
	J. Hughes 19'; Eden 68'; Fowell 79'	Report	McMullen 61'; Bishop 70'	Stadium: Chapel Gate

27 November 2022	Cardiff City (4)	6–0	Keynsham Town (4)	Cardiff
	C. Williams 9', 87'; Lloyd 42', 46', 85'; L. Williams 62'	Report		Stadium: Ocean Park Arena; Attendance: 250

27 November 2022	Cheadle Town Stingers (5)	0–1	Burnley (3)	Cheadle
		Report	Ravening 69'	Stadium: Park Road Stadium; Attendance: 109

27 November 2022	Consett (7)	1–6	Stockport County (4)	Consett
	Hewett 41'	Report	Figueiredo 14', 79'; Rathburn 23'; Bentley 33', 37'; Houghton 67'	Stadium: Belle View Stadium; Attendance: 252

27 November 2022	Coventry Sphinx (6)	1–5	Solihull Moors (4)	Coventry
	24'	Report	Edwards 42'; Downs 52'; McFadden 68'; Creaney 77'; Hornsby 84'	Stadium: Sphinx Industrial Supplies Arena; Attendance: 135

27 November 2022	Dartford (5)	0–2	Hashtag United (4)	Dartford
		Report	Wealthall 74'; Gillard 90+2'	Stadium: Princes Park; Attendance: 305

27 November 2022	Dulwich Hamlet (5)	1–2	Gillingham (3)	East Dulwich
	Corrigan 30'	Report	Maslak 22'; Grant 50'	Stadium: Champion Hill; Attendance: 631

27 November 2022	Huddersfield Town (3)	3–0	Durham Cestria (4)	Shelley
	Elford 27'; Sanderson 55', 84'	Report		Stadium: Stafflex Arena; Attendance: 78

27 November 2022	Ipswich Town (3)	3–0	London Seaward (4)	Felixstowe
	O'Brien 11', 53'; King 58'	Report		Stadium: The AGL Arena; Attendance: 199

27 November 2022	Lichfield City (5)	0–8	West Bromwich Albion (3)	Lichfield
		Report	Warner 9', 37', 63'; Tudor 36'; Mahmood 60'; Stamps 65'; George 88'; Walklett 90'	Stadium: Trade Tyre Community Stadium

27 November 2022	Liverpool Feds (3)	4–0	Merseyrail (4)	Aigburth
	Kinvig-Wardale 17', 22'; Stewart 37'; Thomas 40'	Report		Stadium: Jericho Lane; Attendance: 161

27 November 2022	Loughborough Lightning (3)	1–3	Stoke City (3)	Loughborough
	Sharpe 75'	Report	Kivel 13'; Richardson 44'; Hall 70'	Stadium: Loughborough University Stadium; Attendance: 110

27 November 2022	Milton Keynes Dons (3)	3–2	Worthing (5)	Fairfields
	Rush 30'; Miceli 90'; Pepper 90'	Report	Bridge 31'; Humphrey 45'	Stadium: Fairfields Sports Centre; Attendance: 120

27 November 2022	Newcastle United (4)	2–1	Barnsley (4)	Newcastle upon Tyne
	Gibson 68'; Wilkinson 72'	Report	Pierrepont 15'	Stadium: St James' Park; Attendance: 28,565; Referee: Megan Wilson

27 November 2022	Norwich City (4)	3–2	Sutton Coldfield Town (5)	Horsford
	Snelling 63'; Todd 89', 90'	Report	Civil 17', 70'	Stadium: The Nest; Attendance: 343

27 November 2022	Portishead Town (4)	2–0	Exeter City (4)	Portishead
	Lindsey 8'; Strippell 84'	Report		Stadium: Bristol Road; Attendance: 212

27 November 2022	Portsmouth (3)	7–0	Bowers & Pitsea (5)	Havant
	Goulden 41', 77'; Moore 34' (o.g.); Styles 47' (o.g.); Quirk 79', 86'; Rolf 90+2'	Report		Stadium: Westleigh Park; Attendance: 287

27 November 2022	Redcar Town (5)	2–7	Leeds United (4)	Redcar
	Round 7'; Corbyn 71'	Report	Danby 42'; Woodruff 46', 84'; Smith 53'; Ellis 66', 70'; Sykes 88'	Stadium: Mo Mowlam Memorial Park; Attendance: 252; Referee: O. Arakpogun

27 November 2022	Sporting Khalsa (4)	1–2	Peterborough United (4)	Willenhall
	Woolston 30'	Report	Perkins 77'; Driscoll 86'	Stadium: Guardian Warehousing Arena; Attendance: 95

27 November 2022	Swindon Town (4)	0–3	Plymouth Argyle (3)	Swindon
		Report	Whitmore 31', 45+2'; Ireland 69'	Stadium: County Ground; Attendance: 392

27 November 2022	Wem Town (4)	1–5	Nottingham Forest (3)	Wem
	Doster 45'	Report	Domingo 3'; West 63', 65', 77'; Taylor 66'	Stadium: Butler Sports Centre; Attendance: 161

27 November 2022	Wolverhampton Wanderers (3)	5–0	Northampton Town (4)	Wellington
	Cross 28'; George 38'; Morphet 54'; Miller 69'; Merrick 86'	Report		Stadium: New Bucks Head; Attendance: 276; Referee: Katherine Allen

4 December 2022	Liskeard Athletic (5)	0–13	Oxford United (3)	Liskeard
		Report	Johns 16', 21', 51'; Casley 32'; Cole 35'; King 36', 86'; McLachlan 48'; Burridge 64', 70'; Swaby 78'; Liggett 83'	Stadium: Lux Park

4 December 2022	Southampton Women (4)	0–3	London Bees (3)	Totton
		Report	Whinnett 20'; Adebowale 55'; Fisher 90+5'	Stadium: Snows Stadium; Attendance: 85
Note: Original match abandoned after 50 minutes due to player injury

4 December 2022	Watford (3)	6–0	Crawley Wasps (3)	Ruislip
	Ward 20', 66'; Georgiou 49'; Fyfe 54'; Wilson 69'	Report		Stadium: Grosvenor Vale; Attendance: 198

== Third round proper ==
20 matches were scheduled to be played in the third round proper on 11 December 2022, made up of the 28 winning teams from the second round proper and including the introduction of 12 teams from the second-tier Women's Championship. The draw took place on 28 November 2022.

Number of teams per tier still in competition
Super League	Championship	Premier Division	Division One	Regional & County	Total
12 / 12	12 / 12	16 / 24	11 / 35	1 / 53	52 / 136

11 December 2022	Bristol City (2)	2–0	Southampton (2)	Long Ashton
	Hayles 22'; Syme 64'	Report		Stadium: Robins High Performance Centre; Attendance: 287

11 December 2022	Cardiff City (4)	5–0	Bournemouth Sports (5)	Cardiff
	Bartlett 48', 71'; C. Williams 55', 90'; Scahil 90+3'	Report		Stadium: Ocean Park Arena; Attendance: 155

11 December 2022	Coventry United (2)	4–2	Stockport County (4)	Coventry
	Jhamat 25'; McAteer 35', 66'; Wiseman 64'	Report	Bentley 4', 30'	Stadium: Nick Newbold Stadium; Attendance: 165

11 December 2022	Hashtag United (4)	3–0	Actonians (4)	Aveley
	Rowland 14', 44', 80'	Report		Stadium: Parkside; Attendance: 104

11 December 2022	Ipswich Town (3)	7–0	Portishead Town (4)	Rushmere St Andrew
	Biggs 8'; Brasero-Carreira 14'; Boswell 21'; Grey 30', 70'; Horwood 61'; Lafayette 66'	Report		Stadium: Playford Road; Attendance: 0

11 December 2022	Newcastle United (4)	1–5	Wolverhampton Wanderers (3)	Kingston Park
	Elson 27'	Report	Merrick 8', 58'; Morphet 37'; George 51'; Gauntlett 82'	Stadium: Kingston Park; Attendance: 1,386

11 December 2022	Oxford United (3)	3–0	Plymouth Argyle (3)	Marston
	Stevens 8'; Burridge 41'; McLachlan 68'	Report		Stadium: Court Place Farm; Attendance: 257

18 December 2022	Solihull Moors (4)	2–5	AFC Fylde (3)	Solihull
	Ross-Baker 46'; McFadden 49'	Report	McCoy 28', 30', 36'; Carroll 40'; A. Hughes 50'	Stadium: Davisons Law Community Arena; Attendance: 185

8 January 2023	AFC Wimbledon (4)	1–0	Gillingham (3)	Wimbledon
	Dorey 66'	Report		Stadium: Plough Lane; Attendance: 394

8 January 2023	Birmingham City (2)	4–0	Huddersfield Town (3)	Birmingham
	Marshall 5' (o.g.); Quinn 64'; Finn 67'; Pennock 76'	Report		Stadium: St Andrew's; Attendance: 647; Referee: Jack Shepherd

8 January 2023	Blackburn Rovers (2)	0–1	Sunderland (2)	Bamber Bridge
		Report	Herron 61'	Stadium: Irongate

8 January 2023	Burnley (3)	1–0	Norwich City (4)	Leyland
	Ravening 13'	Report		Stadium: County Ground; Attendance: 173

8 January 2023	Charlton Athletic (2)	3–1	Milton Keynes Dons (3)	Crayford
	Johnson 34', 90'; N'Dow 90'	Report	Coupar 66'	Stadium: Charlton Athletic; Attendance: 303; Referee: Gareth Dunn

8 January 2023	Crystal Palace (2)	5–1	Watford (3)	Bromley
	Olding 13'; Blanchard 23', 45'; Doran 46'; E. Hughes 73'	Report	Bradley 60'	Stadium: Hayes Lane; Attendance: 305

8 January 2023	Leeds United (4)	3–1	Stoke City (3)	Tadcaster
	Whitham 20', 47'; Woodruff 63'	Report	Richardson 1'	Stadium: Ings Lane; Attendance: 256

8 January 2023	Lewes (2)	5–0	London Bees (3)
	Mason 29'; Thompson 41', 26'; Copus-Brown 59'; Kraft 86'	Report		Attendance: 475

8 January 2023	Liverpool Feds (3)	2–3	West Bromwich Albion (3)	Aigburth
	Stewart 31'; Brown 75' (o.g.)	Report	Mahmood 10', 75'; Brown 61'	Stadium: Jericho Lane; Attendance: 125

8 January 2023	London City Lionesses (2)	1–0	Portsmouth (3)	Dartford
	Bennett 15'	Report		Stadium: Princes Park; Attendance: 305; Referee: Christopher Poole

8 January 2023	Peterborough United (4)	0–1	Durham (2)	Bourne
		Report	Hardy 57'	Stadium: Abbey Lawn; Attendance: 675

8 January 2023	Sheffield United (2)	3–0	Nottingham Forest (3)	Scunthorpe
	Sweetman-Kirk 47'; Rayner 53'; Enderby 72'	Report		Stadium: Glanford Park

== Fourth round proper ==
16 matches were played in the fourth round proper on 29 January 2023, made up of the 20 winning teams from the third round proper and including the introduction of 12 teams from the first-tier Women's Super League. The fourth round proper was the final round to introduce new teams. The fourth round draw took place on 12 December 2022.

Number of teams per tier still in competition
Super League	Championship	Premier Division	Division One	Regional & County	Total
12 / 12	10 / 12	6 / 24	4 / 35	0 / 53	32 / 136

29 January 2023	Arsenal (1)	9–0	Leeds United (4)	Borehamwood
14:00	Foord 10'; Møller Kühl 13'; Little 43' (pen.); Hurtig 58'; Beattie 70'; Blackstenius 72', 75'; Agyemang 80'; Pelova 83'	Report		Stadium: Meadow Park; Attendance: 2,405; Referee: Adewunmi Soneye

29 January 2023	Aston Villa (1)	11–0	AFC Fylde (3)	Walsall
18:00	Daly 2', 11', 51', 70'; Blindkilde 7'; Dali 21'; Gielnik 22'; Patten 26'; Lehmann 75'; Pacheco 78'; Mayling 88' (pen.)			Stadium: Bescot Stadium; Attendance: 584; Referee: Callum Parke

29 January 2023	Bristol City (2)	4–0	Oxford United (3)	Failand
15:00	Hayles 45+5'; Hutton 48'; Woolley 74'; Syme 84'	Report		Stadium: Robins High Performance Centre; Attendance: 449; Referee: Levi Gray

29 January 2023	Burnley (3)	1–4	Cardiff City (4)	Leyland
14:00	Priestley 89'	Report	C. Williams 22'; L. Williams 28', 32'; Aadland 56'	Stadium: Lancashire County Ground; Attendance: 146; Referee: Harley Hetherington

29 January 2023	Chelsea (1)	3–2	Liverpool (1)	Kingston upon Thames
13:00	Kerr 32', 52', 79'	Report	Holland 62'; Bonner 85'	Stadium: Kingsmeadow; Attendance: 2,682; Referee: Stacey Fullicks

29 January 2023	Coventry United (2)	4–0	Hashtag United (4)	Coventry
14:00	Jones 14'; McAteer 20'; Mann 45'; Thomas 75'	Report		Stadium: Butts Park Arena; Attendance: 403; Referee: Adriana Bucur

29 January 2023	Everton (1)	0–1	Birmingham City (2)	Liverpool
13:00		Report	Pennock 61'	Stadium: Walton Hall Park; Attendance: 664; Referee: Sophie Dennington

29 January 2023	Ipswich Town (3)	0–1	Lewes (2)	Felixstowe
14:00		Report	Kraft 76'	Stadium: AGL Arena; Attendance: 452; Referee: Megan Wilson

29 January 2023	Leicester City (1)	2–2 (2–3 p)	Reading (1)	Burton upon Trent
16:00	Tierney 29'; Cain 92'	Report	Troelsgaard 5'; Mukandi 102'	Stadium: Pirelli Stadium; Attendance: 224; Referee: Stacey Pearson
	Penalties
	Whelan (penalty scored); Cain (penalty missed); Plumptre (penalty missed); Eaton-Collins (penalty scored); Jones (penalty missed)		(penalty scored) Vanhaevermaet; (penalty scored) Dowie; (penalty scored) Mukandi; (penalty missed) Cooper

29 January 2023	West Bromwich Albion (3)	0–7	Brighton & Hove Albion (1)	Hednesford
14:00		Report	Stott 6'; Zigiotti Olme 19', 40'; Carter 56'; Robinson 60'; Visalli 66'; Fox 90+2'	Stadium: Keys Park; Attendance: 213; Referee: Grace Lowe

29 January 2023	Manchester City (1)	7–0	Sheffield United (2)	Manchester
13:00	Shaw 16', 51', 87'; Kelly 38'; Castellanos 45'; Blakstad 53', 78'	Report		Stadium: Academy Stadium; Attendance: 1,878; Referee: Christiana Hattersley

29 January 2023	Sunderland (2)	1–2	Manchester United (1)	Hetton-le-Hole
13:00	Holmes 67'	Report	Parris 39', 69'	Stadium: Eppleton CW; Attendance: 1,810; Referee: Jane Simms

29 January 2023	Durham (2)	3–0	Crystal Palace (2)	Durham
12:00	Lambert 10'; Clarke 16'; Crosthwaite 90+3'	Report		Stadium: Maiden Castle; Attendance: 436; Referee: Phoebe Cross

29 January 2023	Tottenham Hotspur (1)	5–0	London City Lionesses (2)	Leyton
12:00	England 11'; Iwabuchi 45+1'; Spence 48'; Bennett 65' (o.g.); Summanen 79'	Report		Stadium: Brisbane Road; Attendance: 463; Referee: Melissa Burgin

29 January 2023	AFC Wimbledon (4)	1–5	Charlton Athletic (2)	Carshalton
15:00	Hincks 81'	Report	Ayisi 8'; Skeels 11'; Addison 32'; Roe 56'; Johnson 72'	Stadium: War Memorial Sports Ground; Attendance: 238; Referee: Dasa Griffin

29 January 2023	Wolverhampton Wanderers (3)	0–2	West Ham United (1)	Telford
14:00		Report	Brynjarsdóttir 71'; Johnson 76' (o.g.)	Stadium: New Bucks Head; Attendance: 1,692; Referee: Nicoleta Bria

== Fifth round proper ==
Eight matches were played in the fifth round proper on 26 February 2023, made up of the 16 winning teams from the fourth round proper. The fifth round draw took place on 30 January 2023.

Number of teams per tier still in competition
Super League	Championship	Premier Division	Division One	Regional & County	Total
9 / 12	6 / 12	0 / 24	1 / 35	0 / 53	16 / 136

26 February 2023	Manchester United (1)	5–0	Durham (2)	Leigh
12:00	Bøe Risa 42'; Galton 53'; Blundell 67'; Russo 78'; Parris 88'	Report		Stadium: Leigh Sports Village; Attendance: 1,735; Referee: Melissa Burgin

26 February 2023	Charlton Athletic (2)	0–1 (a.e.t.)	Birmingham City (2)	Bexley
14:00		Report	Hodson 101'	Stadium: The Oakwood; Attendance: 363; Referee: Richie Watkins

26 February 2023	Lewes (2)	6–1	Cardiff City (4)	Lewes
14:00	Mason 5', 28', 61', 76'; Weir 89'; Mushtaq 90+2'	Report	Aadland 45+1'	Stadium: The Dripping Pan; Attendance: 857; Referee: David Middleton

26 February 2023	Tottenham Hotspur (1)	0–0 (a.e.t.) (4–5 p)	Reading (1)	Leyton
14:00		Report		Stadium: Brisbane Road; Attendance: 572; Referee: Amy Fearn
	Penalties
	Spence (penalty scored); Graham (penalty scored); Harrop (penalty missed); Ildhusøy (penalty scored); Ayane (penalty scored)		(penalty scored) Vanhaevermaet; (penalty scored) Mukandi; (penalty scored) Eikeland; (penalty scored) Nielsen; (penalty scored) Wade

26 February 2023	Chelsea (1)	2–0	Arsenal (1)	Kingston upon Thames
14:00	Ingle 21'; Kerr 56'	Report		Stadium: Kingsmeadow; Attendance: 2,888; Referee: Abigail Byrne

26 February 2023	Brighton & Hove Albion (1)	5–0	Coventry United (2)	Crawley
14:00	Visalli 17', 78'; Lee 88', 90+3'; Orthodoxou 90+1' (o.g.)	Report		Stadium: Broadfield Stadium; Attendance: 848; Referee: Stacey Fullicks

26 February 2023	Bristol City (2)	1–8	Manchester City (1)	Failand
14:00	Pearse 55'	Report	Shaw 13', 25', 41', 75'; Angeldahl 45+2'; Blakstad 53', 83'; Dahou 90+1'	Stadium: Robins High Performance Centre; Attendance: 1,223; Referee: Jane Simms

26 February 2023	West Ham United (1)	1–1 (a.e.t.) (6–7 p)	Aston Villa (1)	Dagenham
15:00	Brynjarsdóttir 90+2'	Report	Daly 50'	Stadium: Victoria Road; Attendance: 832; Referee: Lisa Benn
	Penalties
	Brynjarsdóttir (penalty scored); Fisk (penalty missed); Filis (penalty scored); Asseyi (penalty scored); Atkinson (penalty scored); Shimizu (penalty scored); Flannery (penalty scored); Arnold (penalty missed)		(penalty scored) Mayling; (penalty scored) Staniforth; (penalty scored) Gielnik; (penalty missed) Nobbs; (penalty scored) Pacheco; (penalty scored) Gregory; (penalty scored) Corsie; (penalty scored) Hampton

== Quarter-finals ==
Four matches were played in the quarter-finals on 19 March 2023, made up of the eight winning teams from the fifth round proper. The draw was made on 27 February 2023.

Number of teams per tier still in competition
Super League	Championship	Premier Division	Division One	Regional & County	Total
6 / 12	2 / 12	0 / 24	0 / 35	0 / 53	8 / 136

19 March 2023	Reading (1)	1–3	Chelsea (1)	Reading
14:00	Troelsgaard 70'	Report	Carter 23'; Mjelde 26' (pen.); Reiten 51'	Stadium: Madejski Stadium; Attendance: 1,865; Referee: Carl Brook

19 March 2023	Aston Villa (1)	2–1 (a.e.t.)	Manchester City (1)	Walsall
18:00	Corsie 20'; Daly 96'	Report	Castellanos 38'	Stadium: Bescot Stadium; Attendance: 1,702; Referee: Rebecca Welch

19 March 2023	Lewes (2)	1–3	Manchester United (1)	Lewes
12:30	Kraft 73'	Report	Russo 8'; Bøe Risa 68'; Parris 89'	Stadium: The Dripping Pan; Attendance: 2,801; Referee: Stacey Fullicks

19 March 2023	Birmingham City (2)	0–2	Brighton & Hove Albion (1)	Birmingham
14:00		Report	Pattinson 28'; Carter 32' (pen.)	Stadium: St Andrew's; Attendance: 541; Referee: Emily Heaslip

== Semi-finals ==
Two matches were played in the semi-finals on 15 and 16 April 2023, made up of the four winning teams from the quarter-finals.

Number of teams per tier still in competition
Super League (Note: Women's Super League teams joined the competition in the fourth round.)	Championship (Note: Women's Championship teams joined the competition in the third round.)	Premier Division	Division One	Regional & County	Total
4 / 12	0 / 12	0 / 24	0 / 35	0 / 53	4 / 136

15 April 2023	Manchester United (1)	3–2	Brighton & Hove Albion (1)	Leigh
17:15	Galton 46'; Russo 71'; Williams 89'	Report	Earps 36' (o.g.); Carter 75'	Stadium: Leigh Sports Village; Attendance: 4,096; Referee: Kirsty Dowle

16 April 2023	Aston Villa (1)	0–1	Chelsea (1)	Walsall
14:15		Report	Kerr 59'	Stadium: Bescot Stadium; Attendance: 5,292; Referee: Cheryl Foster

== Final ==
The final was played at Wembley Stadium on Sunday 14 May 2023.

14 May 2023
14:30 BST

Chelsea	1–0	Manchester United
Kerr 68'	FA report BBC report

Wembley Stadium, London
Attendance: 77,390
Referee: Emily Heaslip (Suffolk)

== Television rights ==
Round	Date	Teams	Kick-off	Channels	
Round	Date	Teams	Kick-off	Digital	TV
Fourth round	29 January	Tottenham Hotspur v London City Lionesses	12:00pm	BBC iPlayer	BBC Red Button
Fifth round	26 February	Chelsea v Arsenal	2:00pm	BBC iPlayer	BBC Two
Semi-finals	15 April	Manchester United v Brighton and Hove Albion	5:15pm	BBC iPlayer	BBC Two
Semi-finals	16 April	Aston Villa v Chelsea	2:15pm	BBC iPlayer	BBC One
Final	14 May	Chelsea v Manchester United	2:30pm	BBC iPlayer	BBC One
