= Belloumou =

Belloumou is an Algerian surname. Notable people with the surname include:

- Badradine Belloumou (born 1984), French footballer
- Samir Belloumou (born 1994), French footballer
- Inès Belloumou (born 2001), Algerian footballer
