= 2025–26 West Ham United F.C. Women season =

West Ham United
2025–26 season
- Head Coach: Rehanne Skinner (until 18 December); Rita Guarino (from 22 December)
- Stadium: Victoria Road, Dagenham
- Top goalscorer: League: All: Shekiera Martinez (10)
Home colours	Away colours	Third colours

The 2025–26 West Ham United F.C. Women season was the club's 35th season in existence and their eighth in the Women's Super League, the highest level of the football pyramid. Along with competing in the WSL, the club will also contest two domestic cup competitions: the FA Cup and the League Cup.

== Summary ==
On 18 December 2025, the club announced that Rehanne Skinner had been sacked. Rita Guarino was appointed as the club's new head coach on 22 December.

On 6 January 2026, Selin Cemal signed her first professional contract with the club.

On 14 January 2026, Rebekah Dowsett signed her first professional contract with the club.

On 21 May 2026, the club announced their squad for the 2026 World Sevens Football taking place in May.

== Current squad ==
As of 2 February 2026

No.	Nat	Name	Date of birth (age)	Signed from	Since
Goalkeepers
1	(Poland)	Kinga Szemik	25 June 1997 (age 29)	(France) Stade de Reims	2024
25	(Republic of Ireland)	Megan Walsh	12 November 1994 (age 31)	(England) Brighton & Hove Albion	2023
30	(England)	Katie O'Hanlon		Academy	
Defenders
2	(Japan)	Yu Endo	October 29, 1997 (age 28)	(Japan) Urawa Reds	2025
5	(Norway)	Tuva Hansen	August 4, 1997 (age 29)	(Germany) Bayern	2026
7	(Algeria)	Inès Belloumou	June 21, 2001 (age 25)	(Germany) Bayern	2024
12	(England)	Ria Bose	February 7, 2006 (age 20)	(Portugal) Sporting	2026
13	(Finland)	Eva Nyström	November 29, 1999 (age 26)	(Sweden) Hammarby	2025
14	(Canada)	Shelina Zadorsky	October 24, 1992 (age 33)	(England) Tottenham Hotspur	2024
15	(Norway)	Ylinn Tennebø	January 10, 2000 (age 26)	(Norway) Vålerenga	2026
28	(France)	Estelle Cascarino	February 5, 1997 (age 29)	(Italy) Juventus	2026
29	(Austria)	Verena Hanshaw	January 20, 1994 (age 32)	(Italy) Roma	2025
43	(Turkey)	Selina Cemal		Academy	
Midfielders
4	(Finland)	Oona Siren	February 23, 2001 (age 25)	(Norway) LSK Kvinner	2024
10	(England)	Katie Zelem	January 20, 1996 (age 30)	(England) London City Lionesses	2026
16	(Republic of Ireland)	Jessica Ziu	June 6, 2002 (age 24)	(Republic of Ireland) Shelbourne	2022
22	(Australia)	Katrina Gorry	August 13, 1992 (age 34)	(Sweden) Vittsjö GIK	2024
33	(Turkey)	Halle Houssein	December 11, 2004 (age 21)	(England) Arsenal	2022
Forwards
9	(Japan)	Riko Ueki	July 30, 1999 (age 27)	(Japan) Tokyo Verdy Beleza	2023
19	(Germany)	Shekiera Martinez	July 4, 2001 (age 25)	(Germany) Eintracht Frankfurt	2024
20	(France)	Viviane Asseyi	November 20, 1993 (age 32)	(Germany) Bayern	2022
21	(England)	Sarah Brasero-Carreira	September 1, 2004 (age 22)	(Portugal) Estoril	2025
23	(Wales)	Ffion Morgan	May 11, 2000 (age 26)	(England) Bristol City	2025
27	(Switzerland)	Leila Wandeler	April 11, 2006 (age 20)	(France) OL Lyonnes	2025
77	(Switzerland)	Seraina Piubel	June 1, 2000 (age 26)	(Switzerland) FC Zürich	2024

=== Professional Game Academy Players ===
The PGA is a revised player pathway which replaced the FA WSL Academy in 2023. The PGA structure provides young players with the opportunity to be selected as part of a professional club's programme, combining football development with their education.

This pathway will allow the players the opportunity to train with Rita Guarino's first-team squad, as well as providing them with the chance to learn and develop at the team's Chadwell Heath training ground.

Note: Flags indicate national team as defined under FIFA eligibility rules; some limited exceptions apply. Players may hold more than one non-FIFA nationality.

No.	Pos.	Nation	Player
42	FW	ENG	Emily Taylor-Brown (on loan at AFC Wimbledon)
44	DF	ENG	Ruby Warwick

On 19 July 2025, the 2025/26 PGA players were confirmed.

=== Out on loan ===
Note: Flags indicate national team as defined under FIFA eligibility rules; some limited exceptions apply. Players may hold more than one non-FIFA nationality.

No.	Pos.	Nation	Player
17	DF	CHI	Camila Sáez (on loan at Bristol City until June 2026)
24	DF	IRL	Jessie Stapleton (on loan at Nottingham Forest until June 2026)
36	MF	ENG	Soraya Walsh (on loan at Hashtag United until June 2026)
41	MF	ENG	Keira Flannery (on loan at Charlton Athletic until July 2026)

== Preseason ==
10 August 2025 Friendly	Sparta Prague	0–1	West Ham United	Great Strahov Stadium
		Report	Ueki 22'	Attendance: Behind closed doors

24 August 2025 Friendly	Liverpool	0–3	West Ham United	Melwood Training Ground
		Report	Morgan 31'; Piubel 50', 53'	Attendance: Behind closed doors

27 August 2025	Arsenal	2–0	West Ham United	Borehamwood
19:00 BST	Maanum 73', 80'	Report		Stadium: Meadow Park; Attendance: 2,594

31 August 2025 Friendly	Brighton & Hove Albion	2–0	West Ham United	Crawley
	Agyemang; Kirby			Stadium: Broadfield Stadium; Attendance: 0 (Behind closed doors)

== Women's Super League ==
=== Results ===
7 September 2025 1	Tottenham Hotspur	1–0	West Ham United	Leyton
12:00	Tandberg (yellow card) 70'; England 86' (pen.); Graham (yellow card) 90+6'	Report		Stadium: Brisbane Road; Referee: Phoebe Cross

12 September 2025 2	West Ham United	1–5	Arsenal	Dagenham
19:30	van Domselaar 5' (o.g.); Gorry (yellow card) 50'	Report	Maanum 21'; Blackstenius 52'; Foord 62'; Russo 90', 90+3' (pen.)	Stadium: Victoria Road; Referee: Megan Wilson

21 September 2025 3	Brighton & Hove Albion	4–1	West Ham United	Crawley
12:30	Hayes 23'; Seike 35'; Symonds (yellow card) 41'; Rosa Kafaji 58'; Marisa Olislagers 86'	Report	Asseyi 51' (pen.)	Stadium: Broadfield Stadium; Attendance: 1,810; Referee: Grace Lowe

28 September 2025 4	West Ham United	0–4	Chelsea	Dagenham
14:30	Zadorsky (yellow card) 7'; Belloumou (red card); Nyström (yellow card) 77'	Report	Beever-Jones 8'; Rytting Kaneryd 12'; Cuthbert 15'; Bright (yellow card) 31'; Björn (yellow card) 51'; Kaptein 70'	Stadium: Victoria Road; Referee: Callum Jones

5 October 2025 5	West Ham United	0–2	Aston Villa	Dagenham
12:00	Siren (yellow card) 34'; Asseyi (yellow card) 79'	Report	Kendall (yellow card) 54'; Hanson 60'; Wilms 67'	Stadium: Victoria Road; Referee: Grace Lowe

12 October 2025 6	London City Lionesses	1–0	West Ham United	Bromley
12:00	Asllani 68'	Report	Gorry (yellow card) 26'	Stadium: Hayes Lane; Referee: Abigail Byrne

2 November 2025 7	Manchester City	1–0	West Ham United	Manchester
12:00	Fujino 26'	Report		Stadium: Academy Stadium; Referee: Ryan Atkins

9 November 2025 8	West Ham United	1–1	Leicester City	Dagenham
12:00	Gorry (yellow card) 4'; Martinez 51'	Report	O'Brien 90+7'	Stadium: Victoria Road; Referee: Kirsty Dowle

16 November 2025 9	West Ham United	3–1	Everton	Dagenham
12:00	Denton 32'; Tysiak 41', (yellow card) 90+1'; Martinez 54'	Report	Payne (yellow card) 47'; Wheeler (yellow card) 58'; Fernández (yellow card) 69'; Snoeijs 88'	Stadium: Victoria Road; Referee: Declan Brown

7 December 2025 10	Manchester United	2–1	West Ham United	Leigh
12:30	Terland (yellow card) 26', (goal) 37'; Janssen 71'	Report	Martinez 53'; Asseyi (yellow card) 60'; Nyström (yellow card) 88'	Stadium: Leigh Sports Village; Attendance: 2,705; Referee: Melissa Burgin

14 December 2025 11	West Ham United	2–2	Liverpool	Dagenham
12:00	Ueki 57'; Csiki 68', (yellow card) 83'	Report	Bonner (red card) 19'; Silcock (yellow card) 44'; Enderby 59'; Olsson (yellow card) 60', (goal) 87'; Kirby (yellow card) 90+3'	Stadium: Victoria Road; Attendance: 1,237; Referee: Abigail Byrne

11 January 2026 12	Chelsea	5–0	West Ham United	Kingston upon Thames
14:00	Endo 1' (o.g.); James 28', (yellow card) 36'; Thompson 40'; Baltimore 44', 70' (pen.)	Report	Asseyi (yellow card) 80'	Stadium: Kingsmeadow; Attendance: 3,335; Referee: Stacey Pearson

25 January 2026 13	Leicester City	1–2	West Ham United	Leicester
11:55	Swaby (yellow card) 33'; Mayling (yellow card) 75'; Nyström 84' (o.g.)	Report	Hanshaw 34'; Martinez 63'; Siren (yellow card) 90'; Asseyi (yellow card) 90+2'	Stadium: King Power Stadium; Attendance: 3,127; Referee: Abigail Byrne

1 February 2026 14	West Ham United	1–2	Tottenham Hotspur	Dagenham
12:00	Martinez 10'; Ueki (yellow card) 77'	Report	Vinberg 54'; Holdt 73'; Tandberg (yellow card) 88'; Spence (red card) 90+6'	Stadium: Victoria Road; Referee: Emily Heaslip

8 February 2026 15	West Ham United	3–2	Brighton & Hove Albion	London (Dagenham)
12:00 GMT	Zelem (yellow card) 6'; Martinez (yellow card) 74', (goal) 86'; Morgan 83'; Asseyi 90+1'; Wandeler (yellow card) 90+1'	Report	Haley (yellow card) 37'; Čanković (yellow card) 38'; Seike 40'; Vanegas 63'; Tvedten (yellow card) 72'; Nnadozie (yellow card) 76'; Noordam (yellow card) 78'	Stadium: Victoria Road; Referee: Adewunmi Soneye

15 February 2026 16	Everton	1–0	West Ham United	Walton
14:00	Hayashi 8'; Gabarro (yellow card) 62'	Report	Cascarino (yellow card) 72'	Stadium: Goodison Park; Referee: Megan Wilson

18 March 2026 17	West Ham United	0–0	Manchester United	Dagenham
19:15	Belloumou (yellow card) 85'; Szemik (yellow card) 86'	Report	Zigiotti Olme (yellow card) 90+3'	Stadium: Victoria Road; Referee: Abigail Byrne

21 March 2026 18	Arsenal	5–0	West Ham United	Holloway
12:00 GMT	Blackstenius 4'; Russo 47'; Kelly 55', 80'; Mead 87'	Report	Belloumou (yellow card) 77'; Hansen (yellow card) 87'; Piubel (yellow card) 90+11'	Stadium: Emirates Stadium; Attendance: 24,711; Referee: Phoebe Cross

29 March 2026 19	West Ham United	1–1	London City Lionesses	Dagenham
12:00	Siren 64'	Report	Fernández 20'; Sangaré (yellow card) 63'	Stadium: Victoria Road; Attendance: 1,318; Referee: Stacey Pearson

26 April 2026 20	Liverpool	0–1	West Ham United	St Helens
12:30	Bernabé (yellow card) 25'	Report	Kapocs 6' (o.g.)	Stadium: Totally Wicked Stadium; Referee: Emily Heaslip

4 May 2026 21	Aston Villa	0–2	West Ham United	Aston
13:00	Hijikata (yellow card) 16'	Report	Wandeler (yellow card) 34'; Cascarino (yellow card) 49'; Ueki 86'; Piubel 90+2'	Stadium: Villa Park; Attendance: 3,417; Referee: Lisa Benn

16 May 2026 22	West Ham United	1–4	Manchester City	Dagenham
13:00	Piubel 62'	Report	Rose 13'; Shaw 57', 72'; Coombs 80'	Stadium: Victoria Road; Referee: Grace Lowe

=== League table ===
Pos	Team	Pld	W	D	L	GF	GA	GD	Pts	Qualification or relegation
8	Everton	22	7	2	13	25	37	−12	23	
9	Aston Villa	22	5	5	12	28	48	−20	20	
10	West Ham United	22	5	4	13	20	45	−25	19	
11	Liverpool	22	4	5	13	21	34	−13	17	
12	Leicester City (R)	22	2	3	17	11	52	−41	9	Consigned to relegation play-off

Source: WSL League Table
Rules for classification: 1) Points; 2) Goal difference; 3) Number of goals scored.
(R) Relegated

== Women's FA Cup ==
16 January 2026 Fourth round	Newcastle United	0–3	West Ham United	Gateshead
19:30		Report	Asseyi 38' (.pen); Ueki 56'; Brasero-Carreira 71'	Stadium: Gateshead International Stadium; Attendance: 1,340; Referee: Abby Dearden

22 February 2026 Fifth round	West Ham United	1–2	Brighton & Hove Albion	Dagenham
12:00	Wandeler 75'	Report	Kirby 6'; Seike 20'	Stadium: Victoria Road; Referee: Sophie Dennington

== Women's League Cup ==
24 September 2025 Group stage	Charlton Athletic	1–5	West Ham United	Charlton
19:00	Bradley 55'	Report	Morgan 18'; Paví 48'; Wandeler 65'; Brasero-Carreira 83'; Martinez 89'	Stadium: The Valley; Attendance: 352; Referee: Levi Gray

8 October 2025 Group stage	West Ham United	2–1	Brighton & Hove Albion	Dagenham
	Wandeler (yellow card) 17'; Piubel 29'; Paví (yellow card) 34'; Csiki (yellow card) 44'; Martinez 75'	Report	Carla Camacho 16'; Rayner (yellow card) 20'	Stadium: Victoria Road; Attendance: 478; Referee: Megan Wilson

12 November 2025 Group stage	West Ham United	5–0	Southampton	Dagenham
19:00	Asseyi 64', 90+1' (yellow card) 73'; Martinez 78', 90+4'; Morgan 84'	Report	Edwards (yellow card) 61'	Stadium: Victoria Road; Attendance: 546; Referee: Megan Wilson

23 November 2025 Group stage	Portsmouth	2–0	West Ham United	Havant
14:00	Rowbotham (yellow card) 34'; Gale 70'; Sheffield 86'	Report		Stadium: Westleigh Park; Referee: Joanne Horwood

Pos	Team	Pld	W	PW	PL	L	GF	GA	GD	Pts	Qualification
1	West Ham United	4	3	0	0	1	12	4	+8	9	Advanced to knockout stage
2	Charlton Athletic	4	3	0	0	1	7	6	+1	9	
3	Brighton & Hove Albion	4	2	0	0	2	6	3	+3	6	
4	Portsmouth	4	1	0	0	3	2	6	−4	3	
5	Southampton	4	1	0	0	3	2	10	−8	3	

Source: Women's League Cup
Rules for classification: 1) Points; 2) Goal difference; 3) Number of goals scored; 4) Number of wins; 5) Head-to-head record

=== Knockout stage ===
21 December 2025 Quarter–finals	West Ham United	1–5	Manchester City	Dagenham
13:00	Ueki 26'; Tysiak (yellow card) 29'; Hanshaw (yellow card) 55'	Report	Kerolin 3'; Hemp 8'; Clinton 42'; Shaw 55'; Coombs 75'	Stadium: Victoria Road; Attendance: 1,008; Referee: Adewunmi Soneye

== Transfers ==
=== Transfers in ===
Date	Position	Nationality	Name	From	Ref.
14 July 2025	MF	(England)	Sarah Brasero-Carreira	(Portugal) Estoril Praia	
30 July 2025	FW	(Wales)	Ffion Morgan	(England) Bristol City	
1 August 2025	DF	(Japan)	Yu Endo	(Japan) Urawa Red Diamonds Ladies	
23 August 2025	FW	(Switzerland)	Leila Wandeler	(France) OL Lyonnes	
14 January 2026	DF	(England)	Ria Bose	(Portugal) Sporting CP	
28 January 2026	DF	(Norway)	Tuva Hansen	(Germany) Bayern Munich	
30 January 2026	DF	(Norway)	Ylinn Tennebø	(Norway) Vålerenga	

=== Loans in ===
Date	Position	Nationality	Name	From	Until	Ref.
4 September 2025	MF	(Hungary)	Anna Csiki	(England) Tottenham Hotspur	22 January 2026	
8 January 2026	DF	(France)	Estelle Cascarino	(Italy) Juventus	End of season	
23 January 2026	MF	(England)	Katie Zelem	(England) London City Lionesses	End of season	

=== Transfers out ===
Date	Position	Nationality	Name	To	Ref.
30 June 2025	MF	(Sweden)	Marika Bergman-Lundin	(Norway) Vålerenga	
30 June 2025	DF	(England)	Shannon Cooke	(England) Birmingham City	
30 June 2025	FW	(England)	Emma Harries	(England) Southampton	
30 June 2025	DF	(Scotland)	Kirsty Smith	(England) Nottingham Forest	
30 June 2025	GK	(United States)	Katelin Talbert	(Canada) Calgary Wild	
30 June 2025	FW	(England)	Ruby Doe	(England) Ipswich Town	
30 June 2025	MF	(England)	Ellie Moore		
30 June 2025	DF	(England)	Marnie Morrison		
30 June 2025	MF	(England)	Macey Nicholls		
30 June 2025	DF	(England)	Daniella Way		
30 June 2025	MF	(United States)	Kristie Mewis		
7 August 2025	MF	(Iceland)	Dagný Brynjarsdóttir		
1 September 2025	FW	(England)	Princess Ademiluyi	(United States) Gotham FC	
15 January 2026	DF	(Belgium)	Amber Tysiak	(Germany) Union Berlin	
20 January 2026	FW	(Colombia)	Manuela Paví	(Mexico) Deportivo Toluca	
2 February 2026	DF	(England)	Anouk Denton	(United States) Bay FC	

=== Loans out ===
Date	Position	Nationality	Name	To	Until	Ref.
28 July 2025	DF	(Republic of Ireland)	Jessie Stapleton	(England) Nottingham Forest	End of season	
31 July 2025	GK	(England)	Rebekah Dowsett (Note: Dual registration)	(England) Watford	14 January 2026	
1 August 2025	DF	(England)	Ruby Warwick	(England) Barking	End of season	
18 August 2025	MF	(England)	Soraya Walsh	(England) Watford	19 January 2026	
28 August 2025	FW	(Chile)	Camila Sáez	(England) Bristol City	End of season	
29 August 2025	MF	(Republic of Ireland)	Jessica Ziu	(England) Bristol City	1 January 2026	
4 September 2025	MF	(England)	Keira Flannery	(England) Charlton Athletic	End of season	
23 January 2026	FW	(England)	Emily Taylor-Brown	(England) AFC Wimbledon	End of season	
26 January 2026	MF	(England)	Soraya Walsh	(England) Hashtag United	End of season	
28 January 2026	GK	(England)	Rebekah Dowsett	(England) Nottingham Forest	End of season	

== Appearances ==
Starting appearances are listed first, followed by substitute appearances after the + symbol where applicable.

As of match played 8 February 2026

No.	Pos.	Nat.	Player	Women's Super League		FA Cup		League Cup		Total	
No.	Pos.	Nat.	Player	Apps	Goals	Apps	Goals	Apps	Goals	Apps	Goals
1	GK	(Poland)	Kinga Szemik	13	0	1	0	1	0	15	0
2	DF	(Japan)	Yu Endo	10+2	0	1	0	4	0	17	0
4	MF	(Finland)	Oona Siren	15	0	1	0	1+3	0	20	0
5	MF	(Norway)	Tuva Hansen	1+1	0	0	0	-	-	2	0
7	DF	(Algeria)	Inès Belloumou	2+4	0	0+1	0	3	0	10	0
9	FW	(Japan)	Riko Ueki	15	1	1	1	2+1	1	19	3
10	MF	(England)	Katie Zelem	1+1	0	0	0	-	-	2	0
13	DF	(Finland)	Eva Nyström	11	0	1	0	1+3	0	16	0
14	DF	(Canada)	Shelina Zadorsky	9	0	0	0	1+1	0	11	0
19	FW	(Germany)	Shekiera Martinez	14+1	6	0	0	2+3	4	20	10
20	FW	(France)	Viviane Asseyi	15	2	1	1	2+2	2	20	5
21	FW	(England)	Sarah Brasero-Carreira	0+5	0	1	1	4+1	1	11	2
22	MF	(Australia)	Katrina Gorry	14+1	0	0	0	0	0	15	0
23	FW	(Wales)	Ffion Morgan	8+4	1	1	0	3+1	2	17	3
25	GK	(Republic of Ireland)	Megan Walsh	2+1	0	0	0	4	0	7	0
27	FW	(Switzerland)	Leila Wandeler	3+9	0	1	0	3+1	1	17	1
28	DF	(France)	Estelle Cascarino	3	0	1	0	-	-	4	0
29	DF	(Austria)	Verena Hanshaw	10+1	1	1	0	4+1	0	17	1
30	GK	(England)	Katie O'Hanlon	0	0	0	0	0	0	0	0
33	MF	(Turkey)	Halle Houssein	0	0	0+1	0	3+1	0	5	0
42	FW	(England)	Emily Brown	0	0	0	0	0+2	0	2	0
43	DF	(Turkey)	Selin Cemal	0+1	0	0	0	3	0	4	0
77	MF	(Switzerland)	Seraina Piubel	1+9	0	0+1	0	2+1	1	14	1
Players who appeared for the club but left during the season:
5	DF	(Belgium)	Amber Tysiak	8	1	0	0	4	0	12	1
11	FW	(Colombia)	Manuela Paví	0+5	0	0	0	2+1	1	8	1
15	MF	(Hungary)	Anna Csiki	1+4	1	0	0	5	0	10	1
18	DF	(England)	Anouk Denton	9+1	1	0	0	1+3	0	14	1
