= Katie Zelem =

English footballer (born 1996)

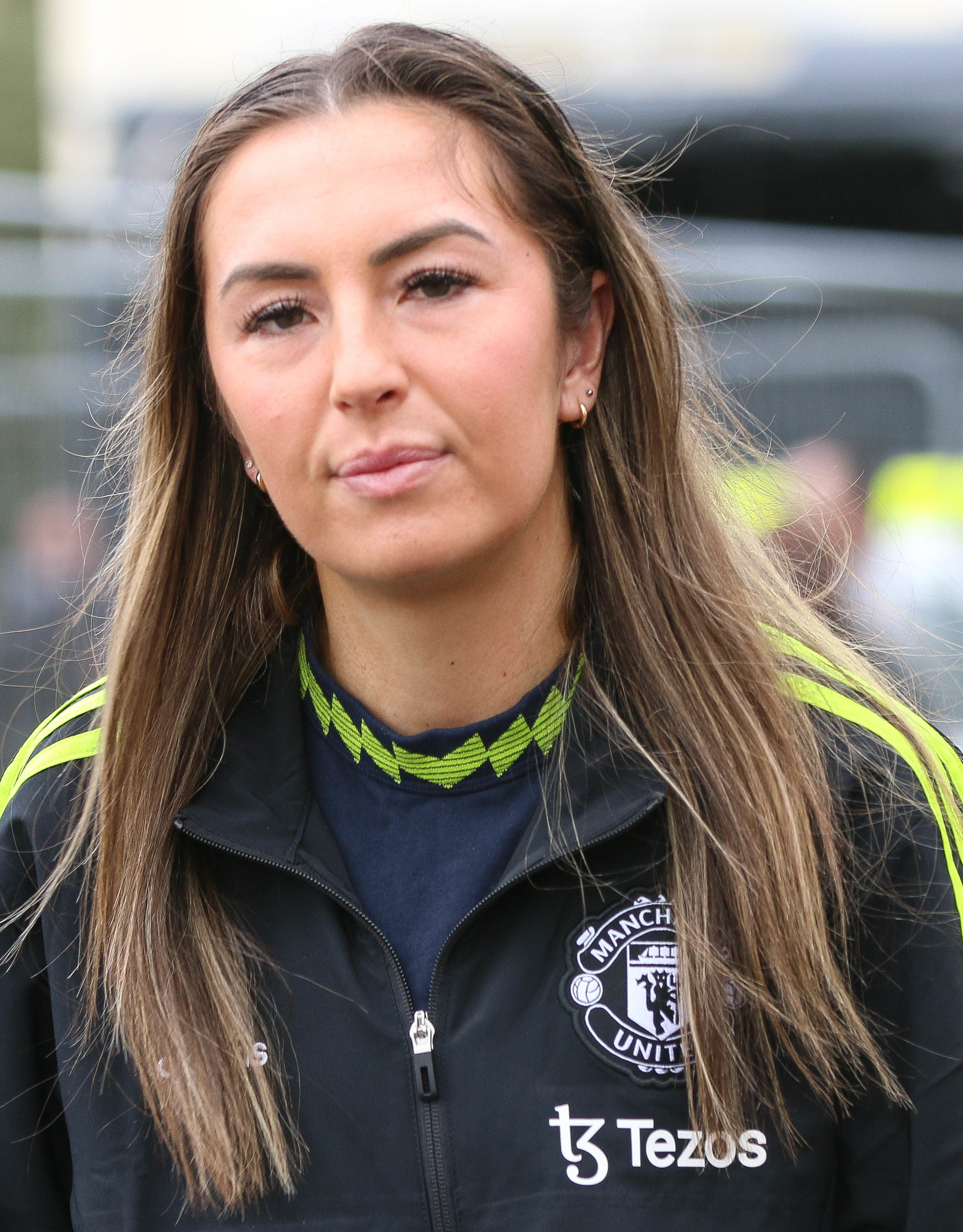
- Zelem with Manchester United in 2023

Personal information
- Full name: Katie Leigh Zelem
- Date of birth: 20 January 1996 (age 30)
- Place of birth: Failsworth, England
- Height: 5 ft 4 in (1.63 m)
- Position: Defensive midfielder

Team information
- Current team: West Ham United
- Number: 10

Youth career
- 2004–2013: Manchester United

Senior career*
Years	Team	Apps	(Gls)
2013–2017	Liverpool	52	(12)
2017–2018	Juventus	18	(4)
2018–2024	Manchester United	161	(32)
2024–2025	Angel City	25	(2)
2025–2026	London City Lionesses	8	(0)
2026	→ West Ham United (loan)	8	(0)
2026–	West Ham United	9	(0)

International career^{‡}
2010	England U15	2	(0)
2011–2012	England U17	14	(4)
2013–2015	England U19	30	(10)
2014–2016	England U20	6	(0)
2016	England U23	2	(0)
2021–2023	England	12	(0)
Medal record
Women's football
Representing England
FIFA Women's World Cup
Runner-up	2023 Australia and New Zealand
- * Club domestic league appearances and goals as of 03:20, 15 November 2026 (UTC) ‡ National team caps and goals as of 26 September 2023

Katie Leigh Zelem (born 20 January 1996) is an English professional footballer who plays as a defensive midfielder for and captains Women's Super League club West Ham United.

Zelem previously played for Liverpool where she twice won the WSL in 2013 and 2014, and Italian side Juventus, winning Serie A in the 2017-18 season with the club. She then joined Manchester United winning the Women's Championship in their inaugural 2018-19 season and later captained the team to an FA Cup title in 2024. She then played two seasons for National Women's Soccer League club Angel City before joining London City Lionesses in 2025. A loan move to West Ham United followed, which was made permanent the following summer.

Zelem has represented England from U15 to U23 levels, scoring 14 goals in total, prior to making her senior debut in 2021. With the England senior team, she is a twice Arnold Clark Cup winner as well as a 2023 World Cup runner-up.

== Club career ==
=== Early career ===
Zelem started playing football when she was six. At the age of eight, she joined Manchester United Girls' Centre of Excellence. Her youth coach Emma Fletcher said Zelem showed a great attitude and appetite for learning and understanding the game.

=== Liverpool ===
With no professional setup at United, Zelem joined Liverpool in 2013. She was in the Liverpool squad for the first time on 3 August 2013 when Liverpool lost 3–0 to Arsenal, however, she did not play.

On 11 April 2014, Zelem suffered a broken collarbone, while on international duty for England under-19, and missed the start of the 2014 FA WSL season. After recovering from injury, she made her senior team debut on 29 June 2014, before being substituted for Nina Frausing-Pedersen in the 58th minute, in a 1–0 defeat against Arsenal in the FA WSL. A week later, Zelem scored her first senior goals in a 7–1 win against Durham in the Continental Cup. She scored two headers, both assisted by Lucy Bronze.

On 12 October 2014, Zelem was an unused substitute in Liverpool's win against Bristol City, as they retained the FA WSL title after a dramatic final day of the season. In November 2014, Zelem was nominated by The FA for the WSL Development Player of the Year, alongside Carla Humphrey and Natasha Baptiste. In the same month, Zelem was named Liverpool's Young Player of the Year. Liverpool coach Matt Beard praised Zelem, likening her to Frank Lampard and stating she has great career in the future. In December, Zelem signed a new contract.

In November 2015, Zelem penned a new contract with Liverpool.

=== Juventus ===
In August 2017, she moved to Juventus for an undisclosed fee. On 9 September, Zelem scored her first goal, on her competitive debut, for Juventus in an 8–0 win over Torino in the Coppa Italia. Zelem played a total of four games, scoring two goals in the competition as Juventus lost 1–0 to Brescia in the quarter-final on 2 May 2018.

On 30 September 2017, Zelem made her first Serie A appearance as a substitute in the club's inaugural match, a 3–0 win at Atalanta. Three weeks later, Zelem scored her first league goal in a 4–1 win against Empoli. On 20 May 2018, Juventus won the Serie A title in their first ever season in existence after defeating Brescia in a penalty shoot-out in the Championship playoff. Zelem left at the end of the campaign.

=== Manchester United ===
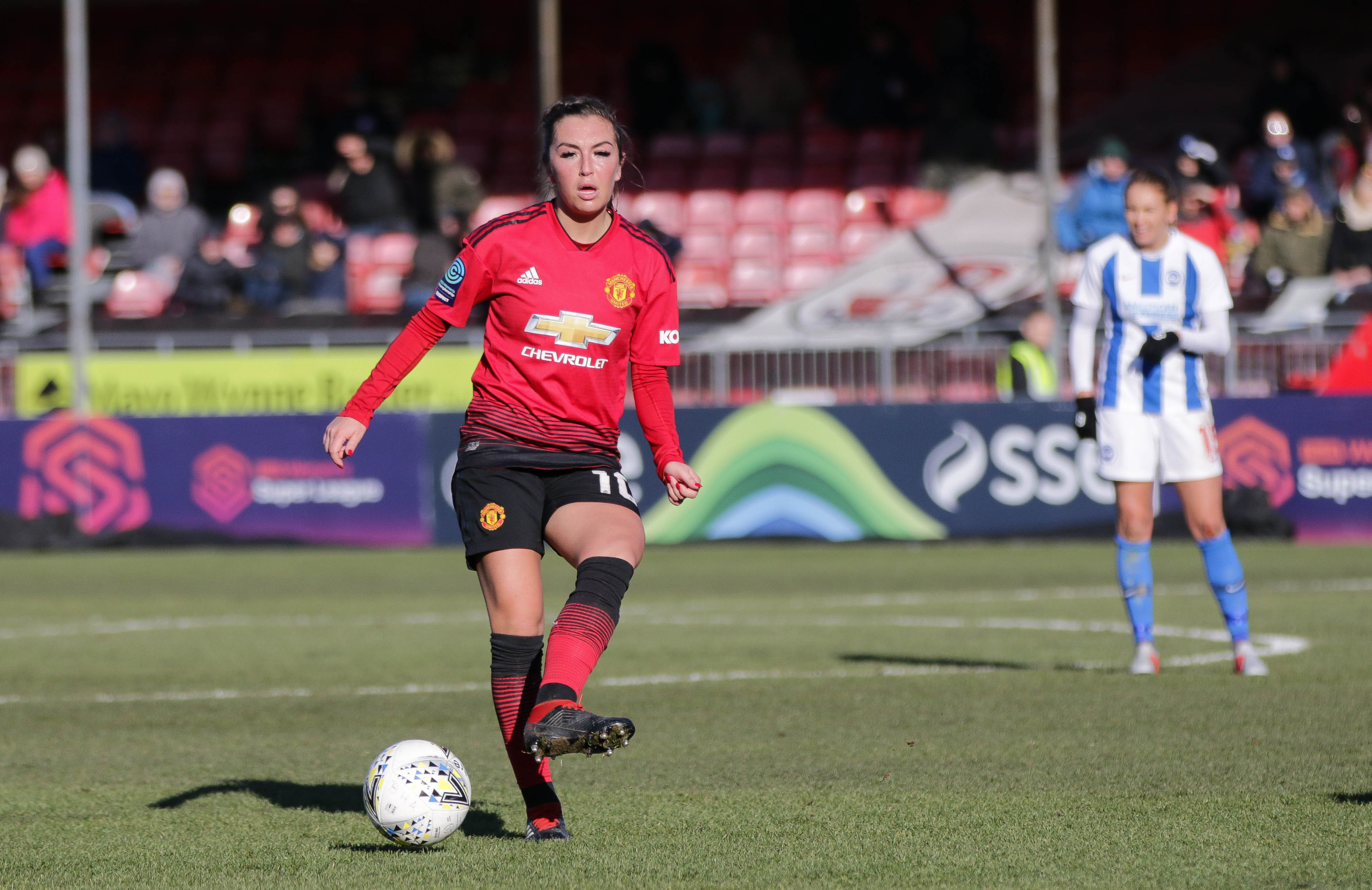
Zelem playing in an FA Cup match against Brighton & Hove Albion in 2019.

In July 2018, Zelem joined Manchester United for their inaugural season in the FA Women's Championship for the 2018–19 season, one of seven players to return to the senior side having played for the club at youth level. She made her competitive debut for Manchester United in a 1–0 League Cup victory against former club Liverpool on 19 August. In the opening game of the 2018–19 Championship season, she scored her first goal for United, on her league debut, from the penalty spot in a 12–0 win away to Aston Villa. Zelem was voted FA Women's Championship Player of the Month for March 2019. At the end of the season, Zelem was named Manchester United Women's Player of the Year. In doing so, she became the first player to win the award.

Following the departure of Alex Greenwood in August 2019, Zelem was named as club captain ahead of the 2019–20 season. Zelem scored her first goal of the season, a penalty, in Manchester United's 2–0 WSL win against Liverpool on 28 September. In a 1–1 draw against Reading on 2 February 2020, a penalty was awarded against Zelem after she was penalised for a handball, despite the ball hitting her head, leading to criticism of the standard of refereeing.

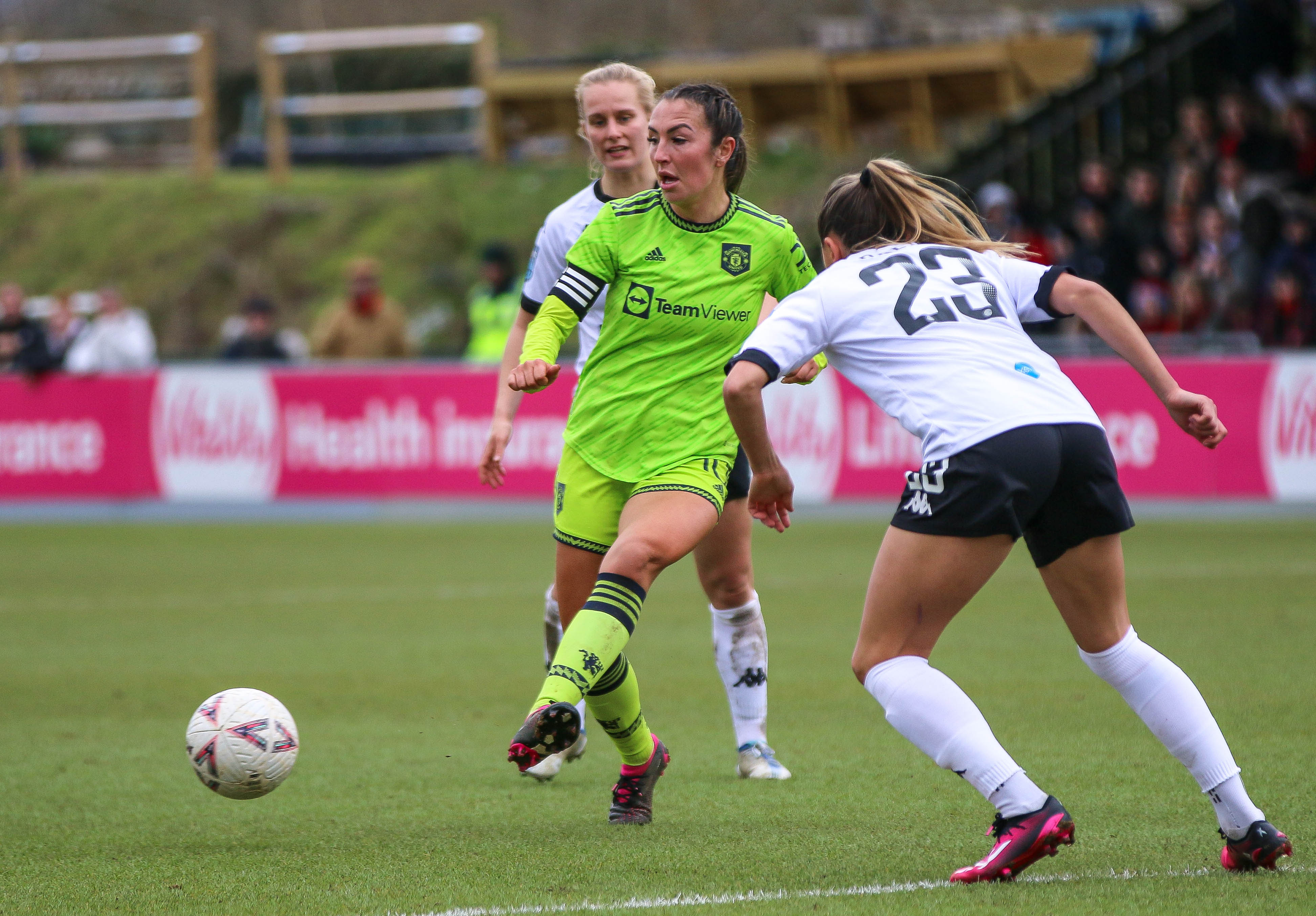
Zelem (centre) playing for Manchester United against Lewes in 2023.

Across two consecutive games in 2022, Zelem scored three Olympico goals directly from corner kicks, one during a 1–4 exit to Manchester City in the FA Cup and two in a 4–0 WSL victory over Leicester City.

On 17 February 2024, Zelem played her 150th match for Manchester United, featuring in a 3–1 league defeat to Arsenal. She left the club at the end of the 2023–24 season, at the expiration of her contract. At the time of her departure, Zelem was the third-highest goalscorer for United and had made the second-most appearances for the club behind Ella Toone.

=== Angel City ===
On 12 August 2024, Angel City announced the signing of Zelem on a contract through to the end of 2026. Zelem made her National Women's Soccer League debut for Angel City on 24 August 2024 in an away match against San Diego Wave, closing out the match to secure a 2–1 victory. Zelem recorded her first assist for Angel City on 12 October 2024, setting up former Manchester United teammate Christen Press' first goal since returning from a two-year ACL injury, in an 1–1 draw away against North Carolina Courage.

On 25 April 2025, Zelem scored her first goal for Angel City during a 3–2 defeat to Orlando Pride.

=== London City Lionesses ===
Zelem, along with Angel City teammate Alanna Kennedy, transferred to newly-promoted Women's Super League club London City Lionesses on 27 August 2025.

==== Loan to West Ham United ====
On 23 January 2026, Zelem joined West Ham United on a loan deal, joining until the end of the 2025–26 season. She credited newly-appointed West Ham manager Rita Guarino as being a key factor in her desire to join the club, having previously played under Guarino during her time at Juventus.

=== West Ham United ===
On 22 May 2026, West Ham United announced that Zelem was making her loan move a permanent one, signing a three-year deal that would become effective from 1 July 2026. On 5 September that year, she was named as the team's new captain going into the 2026–27 season.

== International career ==
=== Youth ===
Zelem made her youth debut for England for the under-15s when she played against Netherlands in March 2010. In August 2013, Zelem was part of the England under-19 team who finished as runners-up to France at the UEFA Women's Under-19 Championship in Wales.

In February 2014, Zelem was named in the England under-19 squad for the 2014 La Manga Tournament in March. In August, she represented England under-20 at the 2014 FIFA U-20 Women's World Cup in Canada. Coached by Mo Marley, Zelem was used as the playmaker of England's midfield. After draws with South Korea and Mexico, England failed to progress to the knock-out stage after being defeated by eventual finalists Nigeria 2–1 in the final group game. In July 2015, Zelem was named in the England under-19 squad for the UEFA Women's Under-19 Championship in Israel. England finished bottom of group B and did not progress.

=== Senior ===
After her youth career, Zelem was not called into the senior squad for several years, but impressed Phil Neville after being named captain of Manchester United, receiving her first call into senior training in September 2020. Part of a 30-player training camp at St George's Park, she was later forced to withdraw after testing positive for COVID-19. Having been an unused substitute in three previous 2023 World Cup qualifying matches under new manager Sarina Wiegman, Zelem made her England debut on 30 November 2021 as a 71st-minute substitute during an England-record 20–0 win against Latvia. Zelem was named as part of England's 28-player preliminary squad for UEFA Women's Euro 2022, but did not make the final squad.

On 18 November 2022, her England legacy number was announced as number 221, and in May 2023, she was named in England's squad for the 2023 FIFA Women's World Cup that July.

== Style of play ==
Speaking in 2014, Martha Harris, Zelem's best friend and Liverpool teammate, rated Zelem as "a very cheeky player [who is] clever on the pitch but is also a risk taker". She began her career as a winger, developing this under the Italian style while playing for Juventus to fit more into a central role when returning to Manchester. She is described as an attacking midfielder with two good feet, who can pick a pass out and finish as well. In the England squad, Zelem has instead been utilised as a defensive midfielder.

== Personal life ==
Born in Failsworth, Zelem is the daughter of former Macclesfield goalkeeper Alan Zelem, whose twin brother is former professional footballer Peter Zelem. She was educated at The Blue Coat School, Oldham.

Zelem greatly admired Fara Williams, who became her role model in developing the game as a midfielder. Zelem considered herself fortunate that she can learn and play alongside a hard-working figure like Williams.

On 12 July 2023, Zelem was elected to the PFA Players' Board, taking over from Manchester City's Steph Houghton, who stepped down.

== Career statistics ==
=== Club ===
As of match played 7 November 2026

Appearances and goals by club, season and competition
Club	Season	League			National Cup (Note: Includes the Italian Women's Cup and Women's FA Cup)		League Cup (Note: Includes the Women's League Cup)		Continental (Note: Includes the UEFA Women's Champions League)		Total	
Club	Season	Division	Apps	Goals	Apps	Goals	Apps	Goals	Apps	Goals	Apps	Goals
Liverpool	2014	Women Super League	7	1	0	0	2	2	0	0	9	3
Liverpool	2015	Women Super League	9	0	0	0	6	0	2	0	17	0
Liverpool	2016	Women Super League	15	6	0	0	2	0	2	0	19	6
Liverpool	2017	Women Super League	7	3	0	0	0	0	0	0	7	3
Liverpool	Total		38	10	0	0	10	2	4	0	52	12
Juventus	2017–18	Serie A	18	4	4	2	0	0	0	0	22	6
Manchester United	2018–19	Women's Championship	18	10	2	0	6	1	—		26	11
Manchester United	2019–20	Women Super League	14	5	1	0	6	2	—		21	7
Manchester United	2020–21	Women Super League	18	2	2	0	3	0	—		23	2
Manchester United	2021–22	Women Super League	22	5	2	1	5	1	—		29	7
Manchester United	2022–23	Women Super League	21	3	5	0	4	0	—		30	3
Manchester United	2023–24	Women Super League	22	1	5	0	3	1	2	0	32	2
Manchester United	Total		115	26	17	1	27	5	2	0	161	32
Angel City FC	2024	NWSL	10	0	—		—		—		10	0
Angel City FC	2025	NWSL	15	2	—		—		—		15	2
Angel City FC	Total		25	2	0	0	0	0	0	0	25	2
London City Lionesses	2025–26	Women Super League	8	0	0	0	3	0	—		11	0
West Ham United (loan)	2025–26	Women Super League	8	0	1	0	0	0	—		9	0
West Ham United	2026–27	Women Super League	9	0	0	0	4	0	—		13	0
West Ham United	Total		17	0	1	0	4	0	0	0	22	0
Career total			221	42	22	3	44	7	6	0	293	52

=== International ===
As of match played 26 September 2023

Appearances and goals by national team and year
National team	Year	Apps	Goals
England	2021	1	0
England	2022	4	0
England	2023	7	0
Total		12	0

== Honours ==
Liverpool

- FA Women's Super League: 2013, 2014

Juventus

- Serie A: 2017–18

Manchester United

- FA Women's Championship: 2018–19
- Women's FA Cup: 2023–24; runner-up: 2022–23

England

- FIFA Women's World Cup runner-up: 2023
- Arnold Clark Cup: 2022, 2023

Individual

- FA Women's Championship Player of the Month: March 2019
- FA Women's Super League Goal of the Month: March 2022
- Manchester United Women's Player of the Year: 2018–19
- Liverpool Ladies Young Player of the Year: 2014
