= Samir Belloumou =

French footballer (born 2006)

Personal information
- Date of birth: 2 May 1994 (age 32)
- Place of birth: Martigues, France
- Height: 1.76 m (5 ft 9 in)
- Position: Midfielder

Team information
- Current team: Valenciennes
- Number: 25

Youth career
- 2000–2010: Martigues
- 2010–2015: Istres

Senior career*
| Years | Team | Apps | (Gls) |
| 2015–2016 | Istres | 1 | (0) |
| 2016–2017 | Le Pontet | 19 | (0) |
| 2017–2025 | Martigues | 151 | (8) |
| 2025– | Valenciennes | 17 | (1) |
- * Club domestic league appearances and goals as of 23 June 2026

Samir Belloumou (born 2 May 1994) is a French professional football player who plays as a Championnat National for Ligue 1 club Valenciennes.

== Career ==
Belloumou is a product of the youth academies of the French clubs Martigues and Istres. He debuted with Istres in the Championnat National in 2015. In 2016, he transferred to Le Pontet in the Championnat National 2. The following season, he returned to Martigues also in the Championnat National 2. Over 8 seasons with the club, he became their captain and helped them achieve promotions to the Championnat National and then the professional Ligue 2. On 17 May 2025, he transferred to Valenciennes on a 2-year contract in the Championnat National.

== Personal life ==
Born in France, Belloumou is of Algerian descent. His siblings Badradine and Inès Belloumou are also professional footballers.

== Honours ==
Martigues

- Championnat National 2: 2021–22
