= Shekiera Martinez =

German footballer (born 2001)

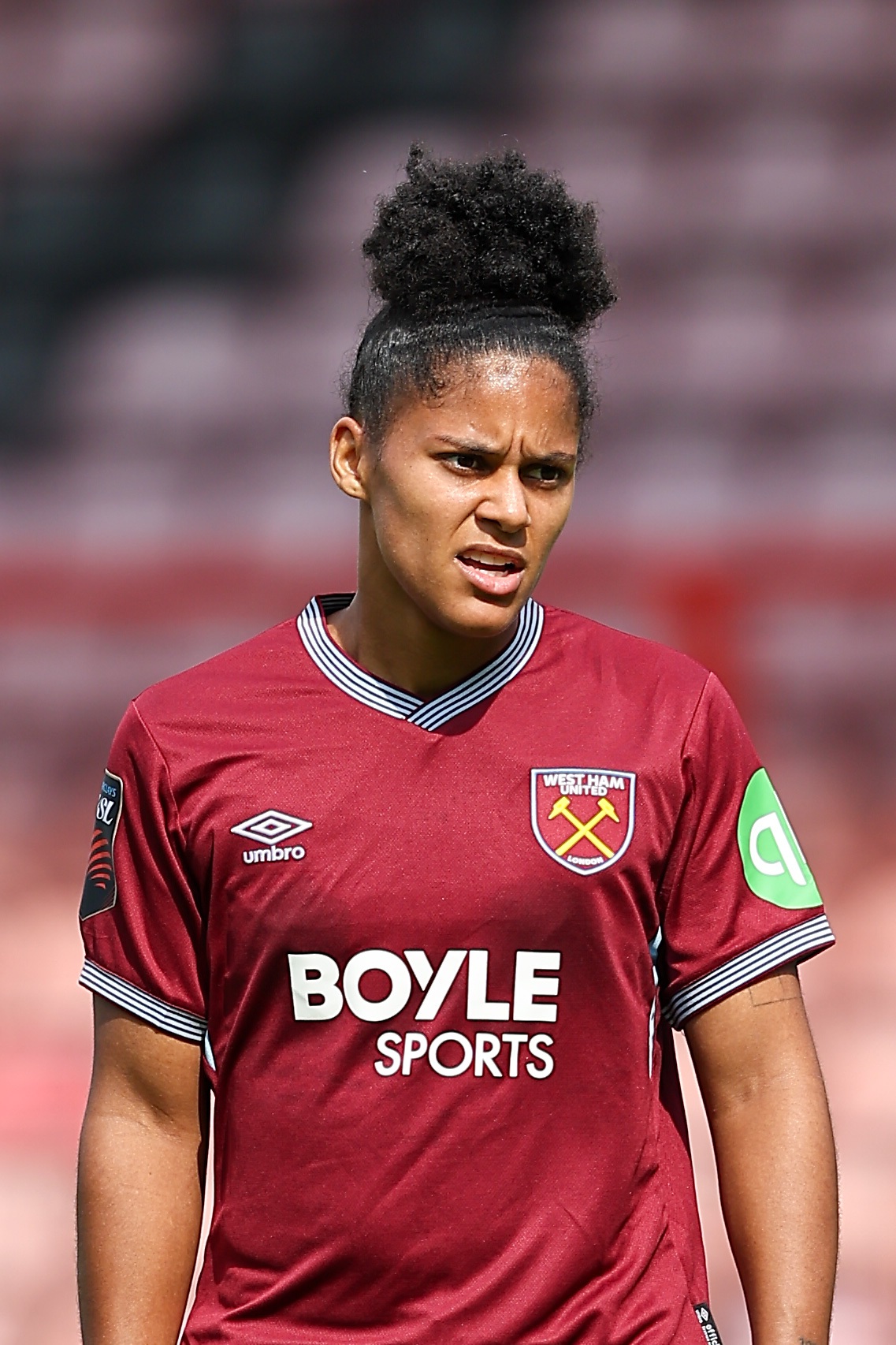
- Martinez in 2025

Personal information
- Full name: Shekiera Aisha Martinez
- Date of birth: 4 July 2001 (age 25)
- Place of birth: Fulda, Germany
- Height: 1.63 m (5 ft 4 in)
- Position: Striker

Team information
- Current team: Tottenham Hotspur
- Number: 19

Senior career*
Years	Team	Apps	(Gls)
2018–2024	Eintracht Frankfurt	111	(24)
2024–2026	West Ham United	32	(16)
2024	→ SC Freiburg (loan)	11	(5)
2026–	Tottenham Hotspur	2	(0)

International career^{‡}
2016	Germany U15	2	(2)
2017	Germany U16	11	(4)
2017–2018	Germany U17	21	(18)
2019	Germany U19	14	(3)
2024–2025	Germany U23	9	(1)
2025–	Germany	6	(1)
- * Club domestic league appearances and goals as of 07:51, 14 September 2026 (UTC) ‡ National team caps and goals as of 21:21, 13 October 2026 (UTC)

Shekiera Aisha Martinez (German: [ʃeˈkiːʁa ˈaɪʃa maʁˈtiːnɛs], Spanish: [maɾˈtines]; born 4 July 2001) is a German professional footballer who plays as a striker for Women's Super League club Tottenham Hotspur and the Germany national team.

== Early and personal life ==
Martinez was born in 2001 to an Angolan father and an American mother of Mexican and German descent. She grew up in East Hesse, Germany.

Martinez attended the Carl-von-Weinberg-Schule in Germany, studying social education.

== Club career ==
On 1 July 2024, Martinez signed a three year contract with West Ham United, prior to joining Frauen-Bundesliga club SC Freiburg.

On 3 January 2025, Martinez returned to West Ham after her loan spell with SC Freiburg having scored 5 goals and providing two assists in 12 appearances.

On 22 May 2026, Tottenham Hotspur announced that Martinez had joined the North London club on a long-term deal, and would join the club once the transfer window opened in June 2026.

== International career ==
Martinez represented Germany internationally at youth level. She was the top scorer of the 2018 UEFA Women's Under-17 Championship with nine goals.

== Style of play ==
Martinez mainly operates as a striker. She has been described as "brings a lot of power and energy, but also an additional goal threat".

== Career statistics ==
=== Club ===
As of match played 13 September 2026

Appearances and goals by club, season and competition
Club	Season	League			National cup (Note: Includes DFB Pokal, Women's FA Cup)		League cup (Note: Includes Women's League Cup)		Continental		Total	
Club	Season	Division	Apps	Goals	Apps	Goals	Apps	Goals	Apps	Goals	Apps	Goals
Eintracht Frankfurt	2017–18	Frauen-Bundesliga	4	0	1	0	—		—		5	0
Eintracht Frankfurt	2018–19	Frauen-Bundesliga	17	6	2	0	—		—		19	6
Eintracht Frankfurt	2019–20	Frauen-Bundesliga	19	5	1	0	—		—		20	5
Eintracht Frankfurt	2020–21	Frauen-Bundesliga	13	2	3	2	—		—		16	4
Eintracht Frankfurt	2021–22	Frauen-Bundesliga	19	5	2	0	—		—		21	5
Eintracht Frankfurt	2022–23	Frauen-Bundesliga	19	5	2	1	—		1 (Note: Appearance(s) in UEFA Women's Champions League)	0	22	6
Eintracht Frankfurt	2023–24	Frauen-Bundesliga	20	1	4	4	—		8	1	32	6
Eintracht Frankfurt	Total		111	24	15	7	—		9	1	135	32
SC Freiburg (loan)	2024–25	Frauen-Bundesliga	11	5	2	0	—		—		13	5
West Ham United	2024–25	Women's Super League	12	10	1	0	2	0	—		15	10
West Ham United	2025–26	Women's Super League	20	6	1	0	5	4	—		26	10
West Ham United	Total		32	16	2	0	7	4	0	0	41	20
Tottenham Hotspur	2026–27	Women's Super League	2	0	0	0	0	0	—		2	0
Career total			156	41	19	7	7	4	9	1	191	57

=== International ===
As of match played 13 October 2026

Appearances and goals by national team and year
National team	Year	Apps	Goals
Germany	2025	2	0
Germany	2026	4	1
Total		6	1

Scores and results list Germany's goal tally first, score column indicates score after each Martinez goal.

List of international goals scored by Shekiera Martinez
No.	Date	Venue	Opponent	Score	Result	Competition
1	9 June 2026	Stožice Stadium, Ljubljana, Slovenia	Slovenia	2–0	2–0	2027 FIFA World Cup qualification
