= Inès Belloumou =

Algerian footballer (born 2001)

- Belloumou in 2026

Personal information
- Date of birth: 21 June 2001 (age 25)
- Place of birth: Martigues, France
- Height: 1.60 m (5 ft 3 in)
- Position: Left-back

Team information
- Current team: West Ham United
- Number: 7

Youth career
- 2007–2016: Martigues
- 2016–2017: Marseille

Senior career*
Years	Team	Apps	(Gls)
2017–2018	Marseille	2	(0)
2018–2023	Montpellier	60	(0)
2023–2024	Bayern Munich	9	(0)
2024	Bayern Munich II	1	(0)
2024–	West Ham United	15	(0)
2024–2025	→ Lazio (loan)	9	(0)
2025–	→ Malmö FF (loan)	11	(1)

International career^{‡}
2017	France U16	3	(0)
2017	France U17	1	(0)
2019–2020	France U19	4	(0)
2019	France U20	5	(0)
2021–2023	France U23	13	(1)
2025–	Algeria	23	(2)
- * Club domestic league appearances and goals as of 15:32, 15 September 2026 (UTC) ‡ National team caps and goals as of 17:38, 19 October 2026 (UTC)

Inès Belloumou (Arabic: إيناس بلومو, [ʔiːˈnas bluːˈmu]; born 21 June 2001) is a professional footballer who plays as a left-back for Women's Super League side West Ham United. Born in France, she plays for the Algeria national team.

== Club career ==
Born in Martigues, Belloumou started playing football for the eponymous local club at the age of five, subsequently coming through the mixed-sex youth ranks; in 2016, aged 15, she began attending the INSEP training centre in Paris, while simultaneously joining the academy of Marseille.

On 18 May 2018, Belloumou made her professional debut, coming on as a substitute for Maud Antoine in the 80th minute of a 7–0 league defeat to Lyon. At the end of the 2017–18 season, she left Marseille after turning down an offer for a professional deal.

In June 2018, Belloumou joined fellow Division 1 Féminine club Montpellier on a free transfer. Following a season with the under-19 team, she signed her first professional contract with the club in September 2019. She then made her senior debut for Montpellier on 28 September of the same year, coming on for Iva Landeka in the 69th minute of a 6–0 league win over Dijon.

On 21 July 2023, Belloumou joined German side Bayern Munich on a permanent deal, signing a two-year contract. She made her debut for the Bavarian club on 8 October, coming on for Linda Dallmann in the 70th minute of a 2–0 league victory over SGS Essen.

In July 2024, Belloumou signed a three-year contract with Women's Super League club West Ham United. She was immediately loaned to Lazio for season 2024–25, where she will accumulate the necessary points to meet the Governing Body Endorsement (GBE) criteria for international player visas.

== International career ==
Born in France, Belloumou is of Algerian descent. She has represented France at under-17, under-19 and under-23 level.

On 5 February 2025, Belloumou's request to switch international allegiance to Algeria was approved by FIFA. 14 days later, she made her debut for the Algeria national team, starting in a 0–5 away win over South Sudan.

== Style of play ==
Belloumou is a defensive left-back, who can also play as a left wing-back. She has been regarded for her defending skills, as well as her technique, her tactical awareness and her agility.

Although she has been compared to Sakina Karchaoui, she also cited Marcelo as one of her footballing models.

== Personal life ==
The youngest of six children, Belloumou is the younger sister of fellow professional footballers Badradine and Samir Belloumou. She also has three sisters, who were all handball players.

== Career statistics ==
=== Club ===
As of match played 12 September 2026

Appearances and goals by club, season and competition
Club	Season	League			National cup (Note: Includes Coupe de France Féminine, DFB-Pokal, Coppa Italia, Svenska Cupen. Women's FA Cup)		League cup (Note: Includes Women's League Cup)		Continental		Total	
Club	Season	Division	Apps	Goals	Apps	Goals	Apps	Goals	Apps	Goals	Apps	Goals
Marseille	2017–18	D1 Féminine	2	0	0	0	—		—		2	0
Montpellier	2019–20	D1 Féminine	6	0	3	0	—		—		9	0
Montpellier	2020–21	D1 Féminine	10	0	1	0	—		—		11	0
Montpellier	2021–22	D1 Féminine	22	0	3	0	—		—		25	0
Montpellier	2022–23	D1 Féminine	22	0	2	0	—		—		24	0
Montpellier	Total		60	0	9	0	0	0	0	0	69	0
Bayern Munich	2023–24	Frauen-Bundesliga	9	0	0	0	—		2	0	11	0
Lazio (loan)	2024–25	Serie A	9	0	1	0	—		—		10	0
Malmö FF (loan)	2025	Damallsvenskan	11	1	3	0	—		—		14	1
West Ham United	2025–26	Women's Super League	13	0	2	0	3	0	—		18	0
West Ham United	2026–27	Women's Super League	2	0	0	0	0	0	—		2	0
West Ham United	Total		15	0	2	0	3	0	0	0	20	0
Career total			106	1	15	0	3	0	2	0	126	1

=== International ===
As of match played 13 October 2026

Appearances and goals by national team and year
National team	Year	Apps	Goals
Algeria	2025	11	1
Algeria	2026	12	1
Total		23	2

Scores and results list Algeria's goal tally first, score column indicates score after each Belloumou goal.

List of international goals scored by Inès Belloumou
No.	Date	Venue	Opponent	Score	Result	Competition	Ref.
1	30 November 2025	Mustapha Tchaker Stadium, Blida, Algeria	Kenya	1–1	1–1	Friendly	
2	9 October 2026	5 July 1962 Stadium, Algiers, Algeria	Central African Republic	6–0	8–0	2028 CAF Women's Olympic qualifying tournament	

== Honours ==
Bayern Munich

- Frauen-Bundesliga: 2023–24
