= Ellie Stewart =

English footballer

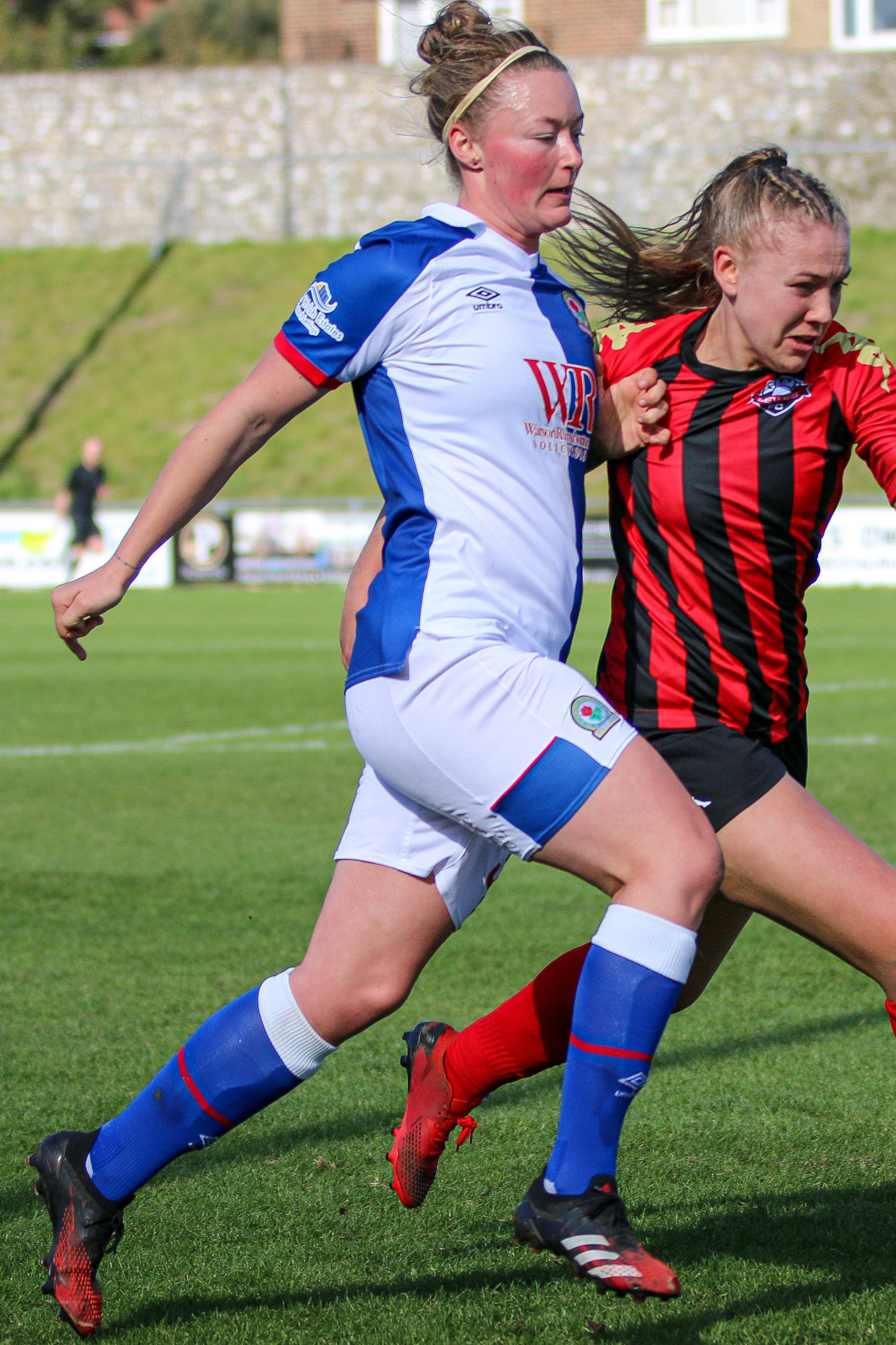
- Stewart with Blackburn in 2020

Personal information
- Full name: Ellie Stewart
- Date of birth: 2 November 1996 (age 30)
- Place of birth: Rotherham, South Yorkshire, England
- Height: 1.76 m (5 ft 9 in)
- Position: Defender

Team information
- Current team: Liverpool Feds
- Number: 37

Youth career
- Everton

Senior career*
Years	Team	Apps	(Gls)
2013–2014	Liverpool	0	(0)
2015–2016	Everton	22	(5)
2017–2018	Sunderland	15	(0)
2018–2021	Blackburn Rovers	31	(7)
2021–	Liverpool Feds	17	(1)

International career
2011–2012	England U17	6	(0)
2013–2015	England U19	11	(1)
2014	England U23	0	(0)
- * Club domestic league appearances and goals as of 21 August 2022 (UTC)

Ellie Stewart (born 2 November 1996) is an English association football defender who most recently played for Liverpool Feds in the FA Women's National League North.
