= Sarah Brasero-Carreira =

English footballer (born 2004)

Sarah Brasero
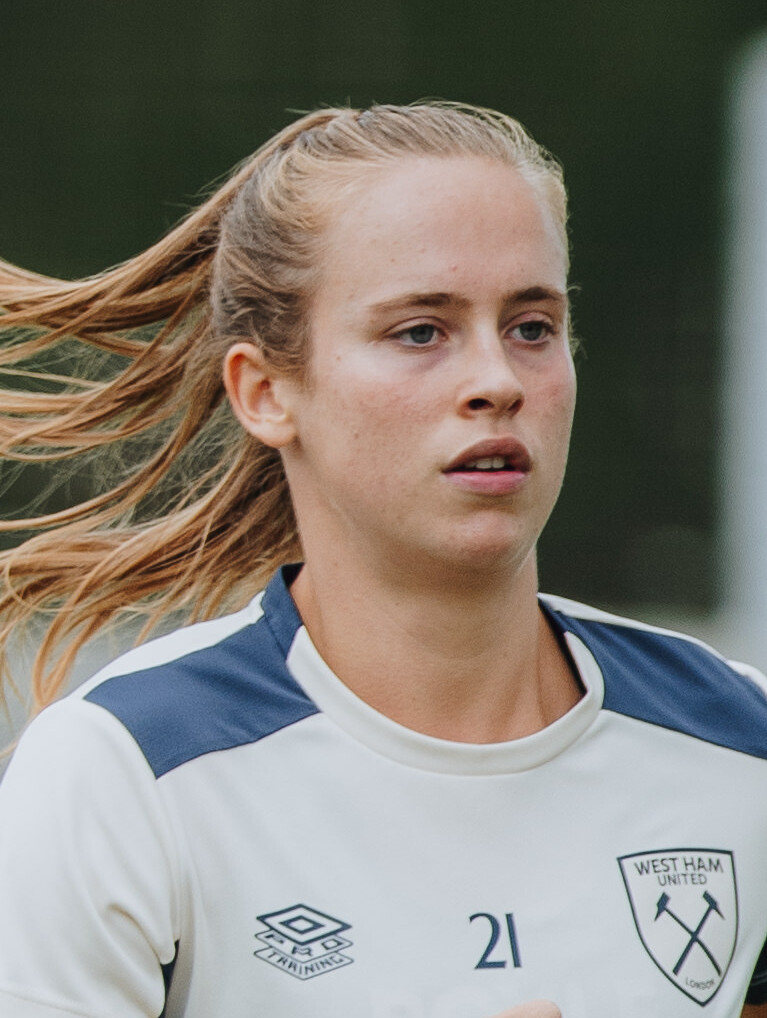
- Brasero training with West Ham United

Personal information
- Date of birth: 1 September 2004 (age 22)
- Place of birth: England
- Position: Midfielder

Team information
- Current team: Deportivo Alavés, (on loan from West Ham)

Youth career
- Ipswich Town

Senior career*
Years	Team	Apps	(Gls)
2020–2023	Ipswich Town	30	(6)
2023–2024	Lewes	17	(1)
2024–2025	Estoril	18	(5)
2025–	West Ham United	6	(0)
2026–	→ Deportivo Alavés (loan)	0	(0)

International career^{‡}
2019	England U15	0	(0)
2021–2023	England U19	3	(1)
2024–	England U23	3	(0)
- * Club domestic league appearances and goals as of 10:11, 30 July 2026 (UTC) ‡ National team caps and goals as of 23:05, 3 April 2025 (UTC)

Sarah Brasero-Carreira (European Portuguese: [brɐˈzeɾu kɐˈʁɐjɾɐ]; born 1 September 2004) is an English professional footballer who plays as a midfielder for Deportivo Alavés, on loan from Women's Super League club West Ham United and the England under-23 national team.

She previously played for National League South side Ipswich Town, Women's Championship club Lewes, and Campeonato Nacional Feminino side Estoril.

== Club career ==
=== Ipswich Town ===
Brasero-Carreira joined National League South side Ipswich Town in 2020 from Sprowston. On 19 October, she made her debut as the youngest ever Ipswich player at 16 years old, in FA Cup qualifying against lower level Peterborough Northern Star, with the team winning comfortably 10–0.

Brasero-Carreira made it into the first team during the 2021–22 season. In October 2021, she scored her debut goal for Ipswich against London Bees in a 3–1 victory. She played for two seasons with the club and scored 7 goals in 43 appearances, before rejecting a new contract from Ipswich.

=== Lewes ===
On 7 July 2023, Brasero-Carreira signed for Women's Championship club Lewes. On 28 August, in the 2023–24 season she made her first start for Lewes in a 4–1 defeat on Southampton, as one of seven new signings to do so in the game. On 12 November, she scored her debut goal for Lewes against Crystal Palace, taking the lead in a 3–2 away league defeat.

=== G.D. Estoril Praia ===
For the 2024–25 season, Brasero-Carreira played for Portuguese side Estoril who play in the Campeonato Nacional Feminino. She scored 5 goals and made 3 assists in 21 appearances.

=== West Ham United ===
On 14 July 2025, Brasero-Carreira transferred from Estoril to West Ham United ahead of the 2025–26 Women's Super League, signing a three-year contract with the club. She was given the number 21 shirt.

On 29 July 2026, Brasero-Carreira was loaned to Deportivo Alavés.

== International career ==
On 17 November 2021, Brasero-Carreira was first called up to the England under-19 squad for Algarve Cup matches, making her debut on 29 November against the Netherlands in a 1–0 defeat.

On 21 February 2023, she scored her debut youth international goal for the under-19s against Switzerland in a 3–0 victory, as part of La Nucia International in Spain.

In November 2024, Brasero-Carreira was called up to the England under-23s as a midfielder for European League matches. On 2 December, she made her debut for the under-23s in a 2–1 defeat to Sweden, replacing Elysia Boddy in the starting lineup prior to kick off.

== Personal life ==
Brasero-Carreira was born in England and shares Spanish and Portuguese nationality.
