= Georgie Davis =

Dutch singer

- Birth name: Kees Rietveld
- Also known as: Kacy Davis, Brainface,
- Born: {02-02-1970} The Hague
- Genres: Pop
- Years active: 1985-present

Georgie Davis (stage name of Kees Rietveld; born 1970 in The Hague, Netherlands) is a Dutch singer, who was one of the first participants of the Soundmixshow in 1985.

== Career ==
Davis performed a song by Stevie Wonder. Later in the year Davis scored a no. 5 hit in the Netherlands with "Blackstar", which was listed in the Dutch Top 40 charts for 12 weeks. In Belgium that song was listed in the Ultra charts on position 25 and remain in the charts for 6 weeks. His album The Power of the Young reached no. 45 in the Nationale Hitparade Elpee Top 75.

Between 1990 and 1995 Davis wrote under his own name Kees Rietveld a total of six songs for famous Dutch singer André Hazes, that were placed on four different albums. All albums were listed in the top 10 album charts, resulting in Davis becoming a multiple gold and platinum selling songwriter and producer.

In 1996 Davis scored a top 6 in the Top 40 Charts as producer and audio engineer for the song "Hij maakte me gek met z'n vingers" performed by the group "De Foetsies".

In 1990 Davis performed in a National Song Contest with the song "Eenmaal" written by John EwbankThe song ended on the last place in the Dutch finals.

In 2005, Davis wrote the song "Baby It’s You" that was performed by female singer Chastity, who reached the fifth place in the Nationaal Songfestival.

In 2007 he formed a duo with Mark Enthoven under the name Eterno. Their song made it to position 97 on the Dutch Top 100 charts.

In 2010, Davis participated in the Dutch X Factor as Kacy Davis.

In 2012 Davis performed with singer Mark Enthoven the song "Anders", especially for kids with an autism spectrum disorder. The song made it to position 23 in the Dutch Single Top 100 charts.

== Discography ==
- "Blackstar", single 1985
- "Take it out in a boogie", single 1986
- "Human Love", single 1986
- "Break her stride", single 1987
- "Eenmaal", single 1990
- "Zal jij mij nooit vergeten", album track, 1991 for singer André Hazes
- "Voor altijd hier bij mij", album track, 1991 for singer André Hazes
- "Jij wilt niet verder gaan", album track 1992 for singer André Hazes
- "Wat ik ook doe", album track, 1992 for singer André Hazes
- "Mag ik dan voor altijd bij jou blijven", single and album track, 1994 for singer André Hazes
- "Kerstfeest voor ons"", album track 1995 for singer André Hazes
