= Emily Kraft =

Irish association footballer (born 2002)

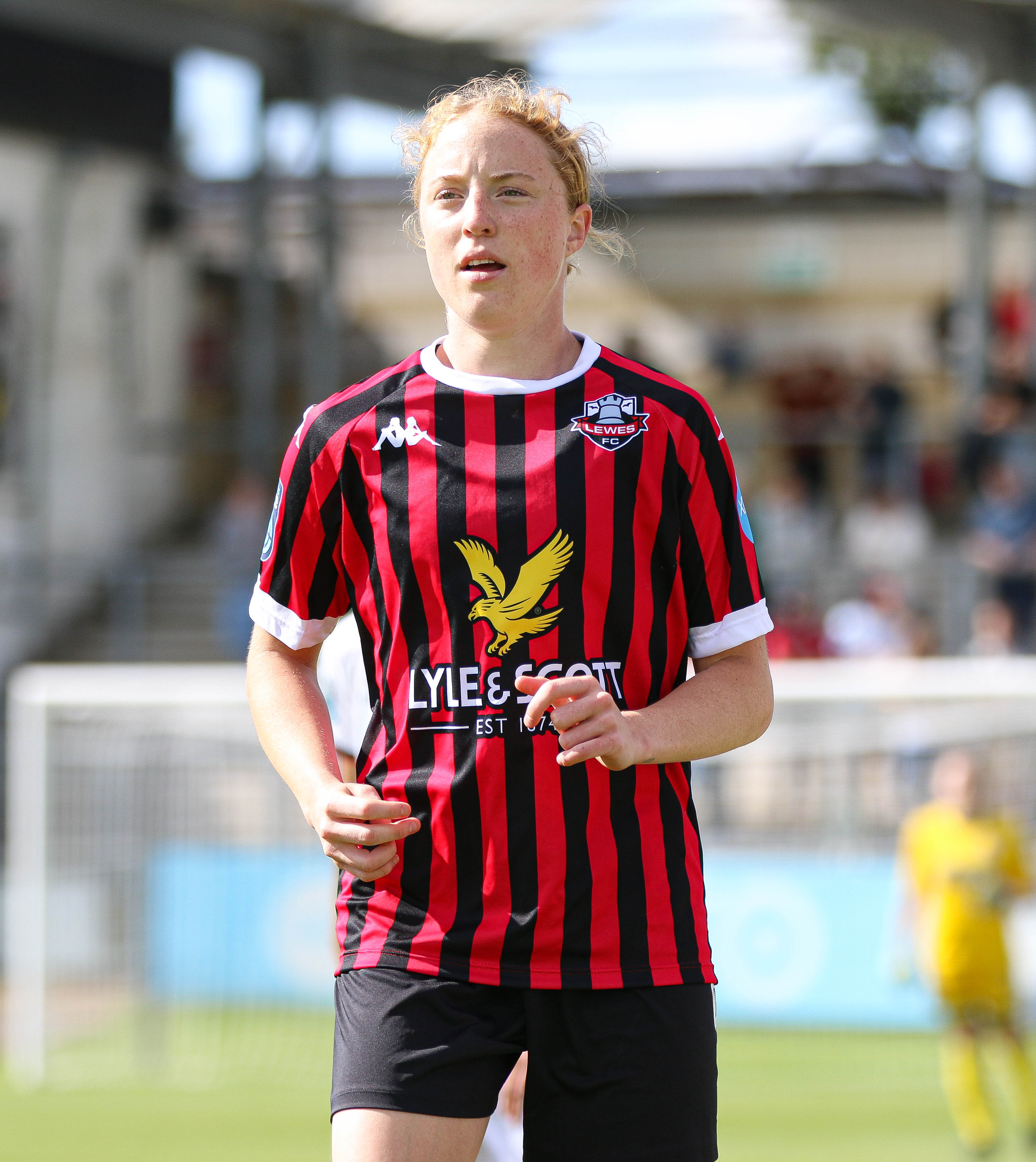
- for Lewes in 2022

Personal information
- Full name: Emily Kraft
- Date of birth: 18 February 2002 (age 24)
- Place of birth: Frankfurt, Germany
- Position: Forward

Team information
- Current team: Shelbourne
- Number: 10

Youth career
- SV Concordia Gernsheim
- RSV Germania Pfungstadt
- FFC Frankfurt

Senior career*
Years	Team	Apps	(Gls)
2019–2020	FFC Frankfurt II	2	(0)
2020–2022	Eintracht Frankfurt II	15	(3)
2022–2023	Lewes	17	(3)
2023–2025	Southampton	11	(1)
2024–2025	→ Aberdeen (loan)	27	(7)
2026	Shelbourne	0	(0)

International career^{‡}
2016	Germany U15	1	(0)
2017	Germany U16	3	(0)
2018–2019	Republic of Ireland U17		
2019–	Republic of Ireland	1	(0)
- * Club domestic league appearances and goals as of 08:22, 11 October 2024 (UTC) ‡ National team caps and goals as of 14:26, 20 January 2019 (UTC)

Emily Kraft (born 18 February 2002) is an Irish (German-born) international footballer who has played football for clubs in Germany, England, Scotland and most recently Ireland. She made her debut for the Republic of Ireland women's national football team in January 2019.

== Club career ==
Kraft played for SV Concordia Gernsheim and RSV Germania Pfungstadt, before joining FFC Frankfurt's youth structure as a 14-year-old. She remained with Frankfurt when they were taken over by the local men's club and became Eintracht Frankfurt in 2020. In July 2022 she transferred to Lewes in the FA Women's Championship.

After scoring five goals in twenty appearances across all competitions, Kraft signed for fellow Championship side Southampton in July 2023. On 8 August 2024, Kraft no.19 joined Katoni Sponsored Aberdeen on a season-long loan. On 17 May 2025, it was announced that Kraft would leave Southampton upon the expiry of her contract at the end of the 2024–25 season.

She joined Irish club Shelbourne ahead of the 2026 season she later departed the club making 0 appearances of features in match day squad 5 games into the season.

== International career ==
After previously representing the Germany women's national youth football team at under-15 and under-16 level, Kraft accepted a call-up to the Republic of Ireland women's national under-17 football team in October 2018. She was able to represent Ireland as her mother Orla is from Dublin. In her first match for Ireland under-17s she scored four goals in a 14–0 win over Albania.

Ireland's senior national team coach Colin Bell called up Kraft for the first time in January 2019, for a friendly against Belgium, staged at San Pedro del Pinatar, Spain. She started the match to win her first cap.

In March 2019, Kraft suffered an anterior cruciate ligament injury in Ireland under-17's 1–1 draw with Norway. She injured her cruciate again in July 2020 while training with her German club.
