= Rio Hardy =

Rio Hardy may refer to:

- Hardy River, Mexican river
- Rio Hardy (footballer) (born 1996), English footballer
