= G.D. Estoril Praia (women) =

Portuguese sports club

Estoril
- Full name: Grupo Desportivo Estoril Praia
- Nicknames: Canarinhas (Canaries); Equipa da Linha; Estorilistas
- Founded: 17 May 1939; 87 years ago
- Chairman: Rui Sota
- Manager: Renato Fernandes
- League: Campeonato Nacional Feminino
- 2023–24: 3rd of 8 (promoted)
- Website: http://www.estorilpraia.pt/
Home colours	Away colours

Grupo Desportivo Estoril Praia (Portuguese pronunciation: [ɨʃtuˈɾil ˈpɾajɐ]), commonly known as Estoril, is a women's football club from Estoril, Cascais, Lisboa Region. The team is a section of G.D. Estoril Praia.

== Current squad ==
As of 31 August 2020.

Note: Flags indicate national team as defined under FIFA eligibility rules; some limited exceptions apply. Players may hold more than one non-FIFA nationality.

No.	Pos.	Nation	Player
1	GK	POR	Rafaela Almeida
3	DF	POR	Inês Galvão
4	DF	POR	Nidia Santos
5	DF	POR	Joana Alves
8	DF	POR	Filipa Rodrigues
9	FW	POR	Mariana Freitas
11	DF	POR	Madalena Lopes
13	DF	POR	Priscila Campota
14	DF	POR	Madalena Marau
16	MF	POR	Ana Rosa
17	DF	POR	Erica Rocha
19	FW	POR	Inês Macedo

No.	Pos.	Nation	Player
21	DF	POR	Catarina Jacinto
22	DF	POR	Magda Matosinhos
23	FW	POR	Cátia Rocha
24	GK	POR	Catarina Bajanca
—	GK	POR	Tatiana Beleza
—	GK	POR	Fátima Ribeiro
—	MF	POR	Catarina Carmo
—	MF	POR	Cláudia Machado
—	MF	POR	Inês Silva
—	FW	POR	Beatriz Fonseca "Bia"
—	FW	POR	Daniela Alves "Pipa"
