= Badradine Belloumou =

French footballer (born 1984)

Badradine Belloumou (born March 15, 1984) is a French former footballer who played as a defender. He previously played for FC Martigues, CS Sedan, Roye, SO Cassis Carnoux, and Marignane. He also had a spell in Algeria with ASO Chlef.

== Career ==
- 2002-2003 Martigues
- 2003-2004 Sedan
- 2004-2005 Roye
- 2005-2008 Martigues
- 2008-2009 SO Cassis Carnoux
- 2009 ASO Chlef
- 2009–2012 Martigues
- 2012–2016 Marignane
