= List of English women's football transfers summer 2024 =

The 2024 English women's football summer transfer window ran from 26 June to 13 September 2024. Players without a club could be signed at any time, clubs could sign players on loan dependent on their league's regulations, and clubs could sign a goalkeeper on an emergency loan if they had no registered senior goalkeeper available. This list includes transfers featuring at least one club from either the Women's Super League or the Women's Championship that were completed after the end of the winter 2023–24 transfer window on 2 February and before the end of the 2024 summer window.

== Transfers ==
All players and clubs without a flag are English.

Date	Name	Moving from	Moving to	Fee	Ref.
4 February 2024	(Jamaica) Jade Bailey	Unattached	London City Lionesses	Free	
5 February 2024	(Czech Republic) Kateřina Svitková	Chelsea	(Czech Republic) Slavia Prague	Loan	
9 February 2024	Abby Clarke	Everton	Burnley	Free	
9 February 2024	Emma Siddall	Manchester City	Burnley	Dual registration	
16 February 2024	Taylor Bell	Charlton Athletic	Chatham Town	Dual registration	
2 March 2024	Remi Allen	Birmingham City	Retired		
15 March 2024	Bethany-May Howard	Southampton	Watford	Loan	
24 March 2024	(United Arab Emirates) Fay Al-Qaimi	Manchester United	Stoke City	Dual registration	
26 March 2024	(France) Sarah Bouhaddi	Arsenal	Unattached	Free	
29 March 2024	Evie Smith	Blackburn Rovers	Liverpool Feds	Free	
14 April 2024	Katie Startup	Brighton & Hove Albion	Manchester City	Loan	
19 April 2024	(Germany) Ann-Katrin Berger	Chelsea	(United States) Gotham FC	Undisclosed	
21 April 2024	Jennifer Handy	Manchester United	Liverpool Feds	Dual registration	
24 April 2024	(Canada) Paige Culver	London City Lionesses	Retired		
1 May 2024	(Northern Ireland) Danielle Maxwell	Blackburn Rovers	(Northern Ireland) Cliftonville	Undisclosed	
27 May 2024	Esme Morgan	Manchester City	(United States) Washington Spirit	Undisclosed	
4 June 2024	Natasha Flint	Liverpool	(United States) Tampa Bay Sun	Free	
4 June 2024	(Scotland) Abbi Grant	(Greece) Panathinaikos	Durham	Free	
4 June 2024	Olivia McLoughlin	Aston Villa	(Scotland) Rangers	Free	
11 June 2024	Mollie Rouse	Sunderland	(United States) Spokane Zephyr	Free	
13 June 2024	(Northern Ireland) Laura Rafferty	Southampton	(Scotland) Rangers	Free	
14 June 2024	(Wales) Rachel Rowe	(Scotland) Rangers	Southampton	Free	
24 June 2024	Ava Baker	Leicester City	Birmingham City	Free	
25 June 2024	Katie Wilkinson	Southampton	(Scotland) Rangers	Free	
26 June 2024	(Sweden) Amanda Nildén	(Italy) Juventus	Tottenham Hotspur	Undisclosed	
27 June 2024	(Sweden) Kosovare Asllani	(Italy) AC Milan	London City Lionesses	Free	
27 June 2024	Jade Moore	Birmingham City	(United States) Tampa Bay Sun	Free	
1 July 2024	(Russia) Alsu Abdullina	Chelsea	(Russia) Lokomotiv Moscow	Free	
1 July 2024	Mia Adaway	Portsmouth	Lewes	Free	
1 July 2024	Angela Addison	Charlton Athletic	Ipswich Town	Free	
1 July 2024	Asmita Ale	Tottenham Hotspur	Leicester City	Free	
1 July 2024	Tinaya Alexander	London City Lionesses	(Denmark) HB Køge	Free	
1 July 2024	Amy Andrews	Durham	Newcastle United	Free	
1 July 2024	(Sweden) Filippa Angeldahl	Manchester City	(Spain) Real Madrid	Free	
1 July 2024	(Australia) Mackenzie Arnold	West Ham United	(United States) Portland Thorns	Free	
1 July 2024	Eleanor Ashton	Manchester United	(United States) Coastal Carolina Chanticleers	Free	
1 July 2024	(Ghana) Freda Ayisi	Charlton Athletic	Hashtag United	Free	
1 July 2024	(Jamaica) Jade Bailey	London City Lionesses	Unattached	Free	
1 July 2024	(Jamaica) Paige Bailey-Gayle	Newcastle United	(Germany) SC Sand	Free	
1 July 2024	Naomi Bedeau	Newcastle United	Nottingham Forest	Free	
1 July 2024	Reanna Blades	Chelsea	Burnley	Free	
1 July 2024	Amelia Bloom	Arsenal	(United States) UMass Minutewomen	Free	
1 July 2024	Ria Bose	Chelsea	(Portugal) Sporting CP	Free	
1 July 2024	Kelci Bowers	Portsmouth	Bournemouth	Free	
1 July 2024	Grace Boyes	Newcastle United	Middlesbrough	Free	
1 July 2024	Ellie Brazil	Tottenham Hotspur	Charlton Athletic	Free	
1 July 2024	(France) Hawa Cissoko	West Ham United	(Italy) Roma	Free	
1 July 2024	Freya Clark	Birmingham City	Stourbridge	Free	
1 July 2024	Hannah Coan	Blackburn Rovers	Portsmouth	Free	
1 July 2024	Delphi Cole	Birmingham City	Stoke City	Free	
1 July 2024	Leanne Cowan	London City Lionesses	Sheffield United	Free	
1 July 2024	Charlotte Crees	Birmingham City	(United States) Missouri State Lady Bears	Free	
1 July 2024	Ellie Christon	Durham	(Poland) AP Orlen Gdańsk	Free	
1 July 2024	Abi Cowie	Birmingham City	Leafield Athletic	Free	
1 July 2024	(Canada) Sabrina D'Angelo	Arsenal	Aston Villa	Free	
1 July 2024	Eleanor Dale	Everton	Sunderland	Free	
1 July 2024	Tyler Dodds	Newcastle United	Unattached	Free	
1 July 2024	Mariela Dolan	Leicester City	(United States) Nova Southeastern Sharks	Free	
1 July 2024	(Australia) Polly Doran	Crystal Palace	(Sweden) Linköping	Free	
1 July 2024	Nicole Douglas	London City Lionesses	Unattached	Free	
1 July 2024	Emma Doyle	Blackburn Rovers	Burnley	Free	
1 July 2024	Toni Duggan	Everton	Retired		
1 July 2024	Mary Earps	Manchester United	(France) Paris Saint-Germain	Free	
1 July 2024	(Kosovo) Elizabeta Ejupi	Sunderland	Unattached	Free	
1 July 2024	(Scotland) Lisa Evans	Bristol City	(Scotland) Glasgow City	Free	
1 July 2024	Georgie Ferguson	Birmingham City	Nottingham Forest	Free	
1 July 2024	Keira Ferns	West Ham United	(United States) McKendree Bearcats	Free	
1 July 2024	(Wales) Anna Filbey	Crystal Palace	Watford	Free	
1 July 2024	Mel Filis	West Ham United	Charlton Athletic	Free	
1 July 2024	(Northern Ireland) Rachel Furness	Bristol City	Newcastle United	Free	
1 July 2024	Bridget Galloway	Newcastle United	Nottingham Forest	Free	
1 July 2024	(Wales) Evie Gane	Portsmouth	Fulham	Free	
1 July 2024	(Spain) Lucía García	Manchester United	(Mexico) Monterrey	Free	
1 July 2024	(Hungary) Kayla Ginger	Brighton & Hove Albion	(United States) South Alabama Jaguars	Free	
1 July 2024	(Wales) Josie Green	Leicester City	Crystal Palace	Free	
1 July 2024	(Jamaica) Izzy Groves	London City Lionesses	Unattached	Free	
1 July 2024	Shauna Guyatt	Crystal Palace	Ipswich Town	Free	
1 July 2024	Alison Hall	Portsmouth	Bournemouth	Free	
1 July 2024	Jennifer Handy	Manchester United	(United States) Louisiana–Monroe Warhawks	Free	
1 July 2024	Bethany Hartigan	Tottenham Hotspur	(United States) IU Indy Jaguars	Free	
1 July 2024	(Japan) Honoka Hayashi	West Ham United	Everton	Free	
1 July 2024	Gracie Hickman	Tottenham Hotspur	Billericay Town	Free	
1 July 2024	Alice Higginbottom	Birmingham City	Stoke City	Free	
1 July 2024	Phoebe Hill	Birmingham City	Stourbridge	Free	
1 July 2024	Jess Hood	Birmingham City	Stourbridge	Free	
1 July 2024	Megan Hornby	Blackburn Rovers	Portsmouth	Free	
1 July 2024	Steph Houghton	Manchester City	Retired		
1 July 2024	Bethany-May Howard	Southampton	Oxford United	Free	
1 July 2024	Taylor Howarth	Blackburn Rovers	(United States) Ole Miss Rebels	Free	
1 July 2024	Sienna Hurrell	Arsenal	(United States) Louisiana Ragin' Cajuns	Free	
1 July 2024	Lulu Jarvis	Brighton & Hove Albion	Plymouth Argyle	Free	
1 July 2024	Kate Jeffery	Southampton	(United States) Valparaiso Beacons	Free	
1 July 2024	(Wales) Lois Joel	London City Lionesses	Newcastle United	Free	
1 July 2024	Annabel Johnson	Crystal Palace	Retired		
1 July 2024	(Jamaica) Melissa Johnson	Charlton Athletic	Nottingham Forest	Free	
1 July 2024	Lucy Jones	Birmingham City	Derby County	Free	
1 July 2024	(Poland) Nikola Karczewska	Tottenham Hotspur	(Italy) AC Milan	Free	
1 July 2024	Fran Kirby	Chelsea	Brighton & Hove Albion	Free	
1 July 2024	Fran Kitching	Crystal Palace	Unattached	Free	
1 July 2024	(Finland) Emma Koivisto	Liverpool	(Italy) AC Milan	Free	
1 July 2024	(Sweden) Emma Kullberg	Brighton & Hove Albion	(Italy) Juventus	Free	
1 July 2024	Ginny Lackey	Manchester City	(United States) James Madison Dukes	Free	
1 July 2024	Demi Lambourne	Leicester City	Sunderland	Free	
1 July 2024	Dani Lane	Portsmouth	Worthing	Free	
1 July 2024	Melissa Lawley	Liverpool	Everton	Free	
1 July 2024	Mia Leath	Liverpool	(United States) UAB Blazers	Free	
1 July 2024	Lexi Lloyd-Smith	Southampton	Bristol City	Free	
1 July 2024	Bella Lobley	Sheffield United	(United States) Maryville Saints	Free	
1 July 2024	Ellie-Mae Locke	Birmingham City	Sporting Khalsa	Free	
1 July 2024	Heidi Logan	Charlton Athletic	Burnley	Free	
1 July 2024	Kate Longhurst	Charlton Athletic	Nottingham Forest	Free	
1 July 2024	Maddie Loughborough	Bristol City	(United States) Concord Mountain Lions	Free	
1 July 2024	Ruby Mace	Manchester City	Leicester City	Free	
1 July 2024	(Northern Ireland) Simone Magill	Aston Villa	Birmingham City	Free	
1 July 2024	(United States) Kaylan Marckese	Arsenal	(United States) Tampa Bay Sun	Free	
1 July 2024	(Germany) Shekiera Martinez	(Germany) Eintracht Frankfurt	West Ham United	Free	
1 July 2024	(Germany) Shekiera Martinez	West Ham United	(Germany) SC Freiburg	Loan	
1 July 2024	(Republic of Ireland) Naoisha McAloon	Durham	Burnley	Free	
1 July 2024	Grace McCatty	Sunderland	Retired		
1 July 2024	(Wales) Beth McGowan	Birmingham City	Derby County	Free	
1 July 2024	Tegan McGowan	Charlton Athletic	Birmingham City	Free	
1 July 2024	(Northern Ireland) Rebecca McKenna	Charlton Athletic	Birmingham City	Free	
1 July 2024	(Norway) Maren Mjelde	Chelsea	(Norway) Arna-Bjørnar	Free	
1 July 2024	(Netherlands) Vivianne Miedema	Arsenal	Manchester City	Free	
1 July 2024	Cara Milne-Redhead	Newcastle United	Retired		
1 July 2024	Claudia Moan	Sunderland	Newcastle United	Free	
1 July 2024	Ella Morris	Southampton	Tottenham Hotspur	Free	
1 July 2024	Izzy Morris	Everton	(United States) Niagara Purple Eagles	Free	
1 July 2024	Alice Mottershead	Liverpool	(United States) Florida Tech Panthers	Free	
1 July 2024	Faye Mullen	Sunderland	Retired		
1 July 2024	Grace Murphy	Birmingham City	Stourbridge	Free	
1 July 2024	Natalia Negri	Crystal Palace	Ipswich Town	Free	
1 July 2024	Erin Nelson	Newcastle United	Stoke City	Free	
1 July 2024	Phoebe Nicholls	Birmingham City	Leafield Athletic	Free	
1 July 2024	Ellie Noble	Crystal Palace	Blackburn Rovers	Free	
1 July 2024	(South Africa) Faith Nokuthula	Blackburn Rovers	Unattached	Free	
1 July 2024	(Republic of Ireland) Saoirse Noonan	Durham	(Scotland) Celtic	Free	
1 July 2024	Dolcie O'Connor	Manchester City	(United States) Coastal Carolina Chanticleers	Free	
1 July 2024	Izzy Oldroyd	Sheffield United	(United States) Maryville Saints	Free	
1 July 2024	(Netherlands) Marisa Olislagers	(Netherlands) Twente	Brighton & Hove Albion	Free	
1 July 2024	(Venezuela) Sonia O'Neill	London City Lionesses	Unattached	Free	
1 July 2024	Aimee Palmer	Leicester City	Southampton	Free	
1 July 2024	Rosie Parnell	Southampton	Retired		
1 July 2024	Issy Payne	Brighton & Hove Albion	(United States) Saint Peter's Peacocks	Free	
1 July 2024	Gracie Pearse	Tottenham Hotspur	Charlton Athletic	Free	
1 July 2024	(Germany) Ramona Petzelberger	Tottenham Hotspur	(Italy) Como	Free	
1 July 2024	(New Zealand) Ria Percival	Tottenham Hotspur	Unattached	Free	
1 July 2024	(Wales) Sophie Phillips	Birmingham City	(Wales) The New Saints	Free	
1 July 2024	Ava Pickard	Liverpool	(United States) Hofstra Pride	Free	
1 July 2024	(Wales) Grace Pilling	Blackburn Rovers	(United States) Texas Tech Red Raiders	Free	
1 July 2024	(Portugal) Tatiana Pinto	Brighton & Hove Albion	(Spain) Atlético Madrid	Free	
1 July 2024	Bex Rayner	Sheffield United	Brighton & Hove Albion	Free	
1 July 2024	(Scotland) Kirsten Reilly	Crystal Palace	(Scotland) Hibernian	Free	
1 July 2024	Jade Richards	Blackburn Rovers	Burnley	Free	
1 July 2024	Milly Robertson	Blackburn Rovers	Unattached	Free	
1 July 2024	Katie Robinson	Brighton & Hove Albion	Aston Villa	Free	
1 July 2024	Monique Robinson	Leicester City	Sheffield United	Free	
1 July 2024	Ellie Roebuck	Manchester City	(Spain) Barcelona	Free	
1 July 2024	Sian Rogers	Charlton Athletic	Sheffield United	Free	
1 July 2024	Ella Rutherford	Charlton Athletic	Ipswich Town	Free	
1 July 2024	Leeta Rutherford	Portsmouth	AFC Wimbledon	Free	
1 July 2024	(Germany) Shanell Salgado	Blackburn Rovers	Unattached	Free	
1 July 2024	Clara Samson	Manchester City	(United States) UC Irvine Anteaters	Free	
1 July 2024	(Greece) Veatriki Sarri	Brighton & Hove Albion	Everton	Free	
1 July 2024	(New Zealand) Paige Satchell	London City Lionesses	Unattached	Free	
1 July 2024	Tierney Scott	Portsmouth	Worthing	Free	
1 July 2024	Helen Seed	Blackburn Rovers	Burnley	Free	
1 July 2024	Lucy Shepherd	Blackburn Rovers	(United States) Dallas Trinity	Free	
1 July 2024	(Japan) Risa Shimizu	West Ham United	Manchester City	Free	
1 July 2024	(Australia) Remy Siemsen	Leicester City	(Sweden) Kristianstads DFF	Free	
1 July 2024	Keira Skelton	Newcastle United	Middlesbrough	Free	
1 July 2024	Mia Smith	Portsmouth	Cheltenham Town	Free	
1 July 2024	Jess Smith	Portsmouth	Unattached	Free	
1 July 2024	(Denmark) Emma Snerle	West Ham United	(Italy) Fiorentina	Free	
1 July 2024	Megan Sofield	Manchester United	(United States) Arizona State Sun Devils	Free	
1 July 2024	(Wales) Poppy Soper	Charlton Athletic	Blackburn Rovers	Free	
1 July 2024	Anna Soulsby	Newcastle United	Durham Cestria	Free	
1 July 2024	Georgina Spraggon	Newcastle United	(United States) Jacksonville Dolphins	Free	
1 July 2024	(Wales) Farrah Stephens-Martin	Brighton & Hove Albion	(United States) Kansas State Wildcats	Free	
1 July 2024	Demi Stokes	Manchester City	Newcastle United	Free	
1 July 2024	(Canada) Sarah Stratigakis	Bristol City	(France) Saint-Étienne	Free	
1 July 2024	Abbey-Leigh Stringer	West Ham United	(United States) DC Power	Free	
1 July 2024	Beth Strutton	Manchester City	(United States) Louisiana–Monroe Warhawks	Free	
1 July 2024	Ailsa Swinburne	Newcastle United	(United States) Concord Mountain Lions	Free	
1 July 2024	(Poland) Kinga Szemik	(France) Reims	West Ham United	Free	
1 July 2024	Miri Taylor	Liverpool	Aston Villa	Free	
1 July 2024	(Wales) Bethan Thomas	Liverpool	(United States) Niagara Purple Eagles	Free	
1 July 2024	(Wales) Lauren Thomas	Blackburn Rovers	Unattached	Free	
1 July 2024	Evie Underhill	Tottenham Hotspur	(United States) St. Bonaventure Bonnies	Free	
1 July 2024	(Netherlands) Shanice van de Sanden	Liverpool	(Mexico) Pachuca	Free	
1 July 2024	(Nicaragua) Stella Villalta	Tottenham Hotspur	(United States) Santa Clara Broncos	Free	
1 July 2024	Aileen Whelan	Leicester City	Retired		
1 July 2024	Ella Wild	Portsmouth	Unattached	Free	
1 July 2024	Maddi Wilde	Bristol City	London City Lionesses	Free	
1 July 2024	Annie Wilding	Everton	Sheffield United	Free	
1 July 2024	Sharna Wilkinson	Newcastle United	Middlesbrough	Free	
1 July 2024	Maisie Wilson	Arsenal	(United States) UAB Blazers	Free	
1 July 2024	(Northern Ireland) Lilie Woods	Newcastle United	(Northern Ireland) Mid-Ulster	Free	
1 July 2024	Libby Wooffindin	Leicester City	(United States) Georgia Southern Eagles	Free	
1 July 2024	Nicola Worthington	Blackburn Rovers	Chorley	Free	
1 July 2024	(Wales) Megan Wynne	Southampton	(Australia) Perth Glory	Free	
1 July 2024	(Canada) Shelina Zadorsky	Tottenham Hotspur	West Ham United	Free	
1 July 2024	Katie Zelem	Manchester United	(United States) Angel City FC	Free	
2 July 2024	(Spain) Mariona Caldentey	(Spain) Barcelona	Arsenal	Free	
2 July 2024	(Netherlands) Dominique Janssen	(Germany) VfL Wolfsburg	Manchester United	Free	
2 July 2024	(Canada) Olivia Smith	(Portugal) Sporting CP	Liverpool	£210,000	
3 July 2024	(Spain) Júlia Bartel	(Spain) Barcelona	Chelsea	Free	
3 July 2024	(Sweden) Hanna Bennison	Everton	(Italy) Juventus	Undisclosed	
3 July 2024	(Jamaica) Shania Hayles	Bristol City	Newcastle United	Undisclosed	
3 July 2024	(Germany) Melanie Leupolz	Chelsea	(Spain) Real Madrid	Undisclosed	
4 July 2024	Harriet Grimshaw	Sheffield United	Stourbridge	Free	
4 July 2024	(Japan) Kiko Seike	(Japan) Urawa Red Diamonds	Brighton & Hove Albion	Undisclosed	
5 July 2024	Amelia Ajao	Chelsea	London City Lionesses	Undisclosed	
5 July 2024	(Netherlands) Jill Baijings	(Germany) Bayern Munich	Aston Villa	Loan	
5 July 2024	Deanna Cooper	Reading	Newcastle United	Free	
5 July 2024	Nicki Gears	Newcastle United	Durham Cestria	Free	
5 July 2024	Freya Gregory	Aston Villa	Southampton	Loan	
5 July 2024	Sophia Pharoah	Southampton	Unattached	Free	
5 July 2024	Meg Shaw	Aston Villa	Rugby Borough	Free	
6 July 2024	(France) Sandy Baltimore	(France) Paris Saint-Germain	Chelsea	Free	
6 July 2024	(Switzerland) Alisha Lehmann	Aston Villa	(Italy) Juventus	Undisclosed	
8 July 2024	(New Zealand) Hannah Blake	(Australia) Adelaide United	Durham	Free	
9 July 2024	(Netherlands) Marit Auée	(Netherlands) Twente	Brighton & Hove Albion	Free	
9 July 2024	Tara Bourne	Sheffield United	Southampton	Free	
9 July 2024	Jess Reavill	Leicester City	Stoke City	Free	
10 July 2024	Katie Bradley	Blackburn Rovers	Charlton Athletic	Free	
10 July 2024	Carly Johns	Watford	Durham	Undisclosed	
10 July 2024	(Spain) Paula Tomás	(Spain) Levante	Aston Villa	£84,000	
11 July 2024	(Scotland) Rachel McLauchlan	(Scotland) Rangers	Brighton & Hove Albion	Free	
11 July 2024	Fran Stenson	Sheffield United	Southampton	Free	
12 July 2024	(France) Melvine Malard	(France) Lyon	Manchester United	Undisclosed	
12 July 2024	Hannah Poulter	(United States) USC Trojans	Brighton & Hove Albion	Free	
12 July 2024	(Chile) Camila Sáez	(Spain) Madrid CFF	West Ham United	Free	
13 July 2024	Gesa Marashi	Arsenal	London City Lionesses	Undisclosed	
16 July 2024	(Wales) Olivia Clark	Bristol City	(Netherlands) Twente	Free	
16 July 2024	(France) Oriane Jean-François	(France) Paris Saint-Germain	Chelsea	Undisclosed	
17 July 2024	(United Arab Emirates) Fay Al-Qaimi	Manchester United	Halifax	Free	
17 July 2024	Lucy Bronze	(Spain) Barcelona	Chelsea	Free	
17 July 2024	Millie Chandarana	Blackburn Rovers	Nottingham Forest	Free	
17 July 2024	Jodie Hutton	Sheffield United	Charlton Athletic	Free	
17 July 2024	(Tanzania) Aisha Masaka	(Sweden) BK Häcken	Brighton & Hove Albion	Undisclosed	
17 July 2024	(Scotland) Charlotte Newsham	Sheffield United	Charlton Athletic	Free	
17 July 2024	Darcie Sugden-Brook	Blackburn Rovers	Hull City	Dual registration	
17 July 2024	(Norway) Elisabeth Terland	Brighton & Hove Albion	Manchester United	Free	
18 July 2024	Rubie Deaville	Everton	Sporting Khalsa	Loan	
18 July 2024	(Spain) Irene Guerrero	Manchester United	(Mexico) Club América	Undisclosed	
18 July 2024	Sophie Harwood	Southampton	Arsenal	Free	
18 July 2024	(Cameroon) Charlène Meyong	(France) Reims	London City Lionesses	Free	
18 July 2024	(Jamaica) Chantelle Swaby	(France) FC Fleury 91	Leicester City	Free	
19 July 2024	Sophie Barker	Sheffield United	Portsmouth	Free	
19 July 2024	(Belgium) Nicky Evrard	Chelsea	(Netherlands) PSV	Undisclosed	
19 July 2024	(Belgium) Sari Kees	(Belgium) OH Leuven	Leicester City	Undisclosed	
19 July 2024	(Nigeria) Toni Payne	(Spain) Sevilla	Everton	Free	
19 July 2024	(Portugal) Inês Pereira	(Switzerland) Servette	Everton	Free	
19 July 2024	(Portugal) Inês Pereira	Everton	(Spain) Deportivo de La Coruña	Loan	
19 July 2024	Sydney Schreimaier	Brighton & Hove Albion	Lewes	Free	
19 July 2024	(Denmark) Katrine Veje	Everton	Crystal Palace	Free	
20 July 2024	Princess Ademiluyi	West Ham United	Charlton Athletic	Loan	
20 July 2024	Sophie Whitehouse	Lewes	Charlton Athletic	Free	
23 July 2024	(Scotland) Rachel Brown	Sheffield United	Southampton	Free	
24 July 2024	Claudia Walker	Birmingham City	Burnley	Free	
24 July 2024	(Sweden) Julia Zigiotti Olme	Brighton & Hove Albion	(Germany) Bayern Munich	Free	
25 July 2024	(France) Inès Belloumou	(Germany) Bayern Munich	West Ham United	Undisclosed	
25 July 2024	(France) Inès Belloumou	West Ham United	(Italy) Lazio	Loan	
26 July 2024	Keira Flannery	West Ham United	Sunderland	Loan	
26 July 2024	Rubie Harris	Brighton & Hove Albion	West Bromwich Albion	Free	
26 July 2024	Abi Loydon	Leicester City	Wolverhampton Wanderers	Undisclosed	
27 July 2024	(Wales) Mayzee Davies	Manchester United	Liverpool Feds	Free	
27 July 2024	(Republic of Ireland) Erin McLaughlin	(Republic of Ireland) Peamount United	Portsmouth	Free	
28 July 2024	Abbie Lafayette	Watford	Sheffield United	Undisclosed	
29 July 2024	Jess Carter	Chelsea	(United States) Gotham FC	Undisclosed	
29 July 2024	Jemima Dahou	Manchester City	Blackburn Rovers	Free	
29 July 2024	(Spain) Inma Gabarro	(Spain) Sevilla	Everton	Free	
29 July 2024	(France) Noémie Mouchon	(France) Reims	Leicester City	Free	
29 July 2024	Sophie Haywood	Sheffield United	Newcastle United	Free	
30 July 2024	Anna Draper	Aston Villa	Milton Keynes Dons	Free	
30 July 2024	Ashley Hodson	Sheffield United	Retired		
30 July 2024	(Serbia) Miljana Ivanović	(Norway) LSK Kvinner	London City Lionesses	Undisclosed	
31 July 2024	Jessica Sigsworth	Sheffield United	Retired		
31 July 2024	(Netherlands) Daphne van Domselaar	Aston Villa	Arsenal	£200,000	
1 August 2024	Ashanti Akpan	Chelsea	Birmingham City	Loan	
1 August 2024	Harley Bennett	Watford	Bristol City	Free	
1 August 2024	Missy Bo Kearns	Liverpool	Aston Villa	£100,000	
1 August 2024	(Republic of Ireland) Jessie Stapleton	West Ham United	Sunderland	Loan	
1 August 2024	(United States) Shae Yañez	Bristol City	Crystal Palace	Free	
2 August 2024	(Republic of Ireland) Megan Connolly	Bristol City	(Italy) Lazio	Free	
2 August 2024	Jessica Francis-Weir	Charlton Athletic	Billericay Town	Undisclosed	
2 August 2024	(Japan) Aoba Fujino	(Japan) Tokyo Verdy Beleza	Manchester City	Undisclosed	
2 August 2024	(China) Shen Mengyu	(Scotland) Celtic	London City Lionesses	Free	
2 August 2024	(Brazil) Giovana Queiroz	Arsenal	(Spain) Atlético Madrid	Undisclosed	
2 August 2024	(Sweden) Anna Sandberg	(Sweden) BK Häcken	Manchester United	Undisclosed	
2 August 2024	Becca Teale	Chelsea	Lewes	Free	
3 August 2024	(Sweden) Julia Roddar	(Sweden) Hammarby	London City Lionesses	Undisclosed	
4 August 2024	Jess Brady	Everton	Stockport County	Undisclosed	
4 August 2024	(Poland) Aisha Nsangou	Everton	Stockport County	Undisclosed	
5 August 2024	Eve Annets	Reading	Manchester City	Free	
5 August 2024	Abbi Jenner	Birmingham City	Wolverhampton Wanderers	Loan	
5 August 2024	Hannah Luke	(United States) Creighton Bluejays	Blackburn Rovers	Free	
5 August 2024	(Jamaica) Satara Murray	Bristol City	Sheffield United	Free	
6 August 2024	Kenzy Collingbourne	Durham	Loughborough Lightning	Free	
6 August 2024	Maria Edwards	(Germany) SGS Essen	Blackburn Rovers	Free	
6 August 2024	(Republic of Ireland) Niamh Farrelly	London City Lionesses	(Republic of Ireland) Peamount United	Free	
7 August 2024	(Northern Ireland) Jackie Burns	Reading	Bristol City	Free	
7 August 2024	Hazel Cotton	Brighton & Hove Albion	Loughborough Lightning	Free	
7 August 2024	Molly Firth	Sheffield United	Huddersfield Town	Free	
7 August 2024	Ellie Hack	Lewes	Blackburn Rovers	Free	
7 August 2024	Ella Houghton	Tottenham Hotspur	Billericay Town	Undisclosed	
7 August 2024	Alice Keitley	Aston Villa	Nottingham Forest	Undisclosed	
7 August 2024	(New Zealand) Indiah-Paige Riley	(Netherlands) PSV	Crystal Palace	Undisclosed	
8 August 2024	Kacey Bolton-Woollam	Manchester United	Huddersfield Town	Dual registration	
8 August 2024	(Hong Kong) Karri Chan	Blackburn Rovers	AFC Fylde	Free	
8 August 2024	Eve Clarkson	Lewes	Blackburn Rovers	Free	
8 August 2024	Holly Deering	Manchester United	Liverpool Feds	Undisclosed	
8 August 2024	(Netherlands) Chasity Grant	(Netherlands) Ajax	Aston Villa	Undisclosed	
8 August 2024	Greta Humphries	Chelsea	Bristol City	Loan	
8 August 2024	(Republic of Ireland) Emily Kraft	Southampton	(Scotland) Aberdeen	Loan	
8 August 2024	Lucy McConnell	Newcastle United	Loughborough Lightning	Free	
8 August 2024	Katie O'Hanlon	West Ham United	Billericay Town	Undisclosed	
9 August 2024	(Canada) Simi Awujo	(United States) USC Trojans	Manchester United	Free	
9 August 2024	Aleesha Collins	Liverpool	Liverpool Feds	Free	
9 August 2024	Holly McEvoy	Liverpool	(Scotland) Aberdeen	Free	
9 August 2024	(Czech Republic) Kateřina Svitková	Chelsea	(Czech Republic) Slavia Prague	Undisclosed	
9 August 2024	(Netherlands) Ashleigh Weerden	(Netherlands) Ajax	Crystal Palace	Undisclosed	
9 August 2024	Lucy White	Brighton & Hove Albion	Loughborough Lightning	Free	
9 August 2024	(Japan) Ayaka Yamashita	(Japan) INAC Kobe Leonessa	Manchester City	Undisclosed	
10 August 2024	Muna Eze	London City Lionesses	Lewes	Free	
10 August 2024	Annie Hutchings	Manchester City	Portsmouth	Free	
10 August 2024	Chenè Muir	Sheffield United	Derby County	Undisclosed	
12 August 2024	Courtney Cook	Charlton Athletic	Ebbsfleet United	Undisclosed	
13 August 2024	(Sweden) Rosa Kafaji	(Sweden) BK Häcken	Arsenal	Undisclosed	
14 August 2024	Charley Docherty	Sheffield United	Burnley	Undisclosed	
14 August 2024	(Canada) Cloé Lacasse	Arsenal	(United States) Utah Royals	Undisclosed	
14 August 2024	(Republic of Ireland) Layla Proctor	Manchester United	Lewes	Undisclosed	
14 August 2024	Emma Siddall	Manchester City	Burnley	Undisclosed	
15 August 2024	Alanta Brown	Sheffield United	Rugby Borough	Undisclosed	
15 August 2024	Isabella Fisher	Arsenal	Ipswich Town	Dual registration	
15 August 2024	Jorja Fox	Chelsea	Crystal Palace	Loan	
15 August 2024	(Denmark) Mille Gejl	(United States) North Carolina Courage	Crystal Palace	Free	
15 August 2024	Teyah Goldie	Arsenal	London City Lionesses	Loan	
15 August 2024	(Sweden) Cornelia Kapocs	(Sweden) Linköping	Liverpool	Undisclosed	
15 August 2024	Holly Mears	Leicester City	Nottingham Forest	Undisclosed	
15 August 2024	(Czech Republic) Barbora Votíková	Tottenham Hotspur	(Czech Republic) Slavia Prague	Undisclosed	
16 August 2024	Ellie Bishop	Tottenham Hotspur	Watford	Free	
16 August 2024	Daisy Burt	Newcastle United	Derby County	Loan	
16 August 2024	Olivia Carpenter	Brighton & Hove Albion	Lewes	Dual registration	
16 August 2024	(Wales) Cadi Doran	Liverpool	Liverpool Feds	Dual registration	
16 August 2024	Katie Dungate	Birmingham City	Nottingham Forest	Loan	
16 August 2024	(Wales) Gemma Evans	Manchester United	Liverpool	Undisclosed	
16 August 2024	Jessie Gale	Arsenal	Watford	Dual registration	
16 August 2024	Clarabella Hall	Brighton & Hove Albion	Watford	Dual registration	
16 August 2024	Daisy Hind	Chelsea	Watford	Undisclosed	
16 August 2024	(Australia) Clare Hunt	(France) Paris Saint-Germain	Tottenham Hotspur	Undisclosed	
16 August 2024	Ellie May	Sheffield United	West Bromwich Albion	Free	
18 August 2024	Tegan Attree	Charlton Athletic	Billericay Town	Undisclosed	
18 August 2024	Layla Banaras	Birmingham City	Wolverhampton Wanderers	Dual registration	
18 August 2024	Martha MacPhail	Aston Villa	Wolverhampton Wanderers	Free	
18 August 2024	(Wales) Bella Reidford	Manchester United	Burnley	Free	
18 August 2024	Tamara Wilcock	Sheffield United	Stoke City	Free	
19 August 2024	(Malta) Maria Farrugia	Lewes	Sheffield United	Undisclosed	
19 August 2024	(Wales) Olivia Francis	Manchester United	Liverpool Feds	Dual registration	
19 August 2024	Naomi Layzell	Bristol City	Manchester City	Undisclosed	
20 August 2024	Aimee Claypole	Chelsea	(Sweden) Linköping	Loan	
20 August 2024	(Wales) Emily Cole	Everton	Liverpool Feds	Dual registration	
21 August 2024	(France) Louna Ribadeira	(France) Paris FC	Chelsea	Undisclosed	
21 August 2024	(France) Louna Ribadeira	Chelsea	(France) Paris FC	Loan	
22 August 2024	(Canada) Kaila Novak	(United States) UCLA Bruins	Durham	Free	
23 August 2024	Elkie Bowyer	Tottenham Hotspur	Watford	Dual registration	
23 August 2024	(Serbia) Jelena Čanković	Chelsea	Brighton & Hove Albion	Undisclosed	
23 August 2024	Grace Riglar	Lewes	Blackburn Rovers	Free	
23 August 2024	Maia Lazarro	Tottenham Hotspur	Watford	Dual registration	
24 August 2024	(Spain) Bruna Vilamala	(Spain) Barcelona	Brighton & Hove Albion	Loan	
26 August 2024	(Colombia) Manuela Paví	(Colombia) Deportivo Cali	West Ham United	Undisclosed	
28 August 2024	(France) Shana Chossenotte	(France) Reims	Leicester City	Undisclosed	
28 August 2024	(Italy) Martina Piemonte	Everton	(Italy) Lazio	Undisclosed	
29 August 2024	Cerys Brown	Chelsea	London City Lionesses	Loan	
30 August 2024	(Wales) Carrie Jones	Bristol City	(Sweden) IFK Norrköping	Undisclosed	
30 August 2024	Emily Orman	Chelsea	London City Lionesses	Undisclosed	
31 August 2024	Eve Annets	Manchester City	Portsmouth	Loan	
31 August 2024	(Morocco) Rosella Ayane	Tottenham Hotspur	(United States) Chicago Red Stars	Loan	
31 August 2024	(Finland) Milla-Maj Majasaari	(Belgium) Anderlecht	Crystal Palace	Undisclosed	
31 August 2024	Lexi Potter	Chelsea	Crystal Palace	Loan	
1 September 2024	(Sweden) My Cato	(Sweden) IFK Norrköping	Crystal Palace	Undisclosed	
1 September 2024	(Australia) Hayley Raso	(Spain) Real Madrid	Tottenham Hotspur	Free	
2 September 2024	(Northern Ireland) Rachel Dugdale	Reading	Blackburn Rovers	Free	
2 September 2024	Isabella Sibley	Crystal Palace	Newcastle United	Loan	
4 September 2024	(Norway) Celin Bizet	Tottenham Hotspur	Manchester United	£60,000	
5 September 2024	(France) Maelys Mpomé	(France) Montpellier	Chelsea	Undisclosed	
6 September 2024	(Hungary) Anna Csiki	(Sweden) BK Häcken	Tottenham Hotspur	Undisclosed	
6 September 2024	Madison Earl	Arsenal	Bristol City	Dual registration	
6 September 2024	(Republic of Ireland) Ellen Molloy	(Republic of Ireland) Wexford	Sheffield United	Undisclosed	
6 September 2024	Katie Startup	Brighton & Hove Albion	Manchester City	Undisclosed	
7 September 2024	Brooke Aspin	Chelsea	Crystal Palace	Loan	
7 September 2024	Libby Bance	Brighton & Hove Albion	Bristol City	Loan	
7 September 2024	Isobel Goodwin	Sheffield United	London City Lionesses	Undisclosed	
7 September 2024	(United States) Katelin Talbert	West Ham United	Tottenham Hotspur	Loan	
9 September 2024	(Switzerland) Seraina Piubel	(Switzerland) FC Zürich	West Ham United	Undisclosed	
10 September 2024	(Poland) Oliwia Szperkowska	(France) Paris Saint-Germain	Birmingham City	Loan	
12 September 2024	Charlie Devlin	Birmingham City	(Scotland) Rangers	Loan	
12 September 2024	(Finland) Oona Siren	(Norway) LSK Kvinner	West Ham United	Undisclosed	
12 September 2024	Charlotte Wardlaw	Chelsea	Sheffield United	Loan	
13 September 2024	Michelle Agyemang	Arsenal	Brighton & Hove Albion	Loan	
13 September 2024	Alyssa Aherne	Manchester United	Sheffield United	Loan	
13 September 2024	(Netherlands) Veerle Buurman	(Netherlands) PSV	Chelsea	Undisclosed	
13 September 2024	(Netherlands) Veerle Buurman	Chelsea	(Netherlands) PSV	Loan	
13 September 2024	Lily Dent	Brighton & Hove Albion	Portsmouth	Loan	
13 September 2024	(South Korea) Lee Geum-min	Brighton & Hove Albion	Birmingham City	Undisclosed	
13 September 2024	(Sweden) Sofia Jakobsson	(United States) San Diego Wave	London City Lionesses	Undisclosed	
13 September 2024	Grace McEwen	Brighton & Hove Albion	Portsmouth	Dual registration	
13 September 2024	(China) Li Mengwen	Brighton & Hove Albion	West Ham United	Loan	
13 September 2024	(Brazil) Gabi Nunes	(Spain) Levante	Aston Villa	£250,000	
13 September 2024	(Spain) Maite Oroz	(Spain) Real Madrid	Tottenham Hotspur	Undisclosed	
13 September 2024	Nikita Parris	Manchester United	Brighton & Hove Albion	Undisclosed	
13 September 2024	(Spain) María Pérez	(Spain) Barcelona	London City Lionesses	Undisclosed	
13 September 2024	Poppy Pritchard	Manchester City	Crystal Palace	Loan	
13 September 2024	(United States) Katie Stengel	(United States) Gotham FC	Crystal Palace	Undisclosed	
13 September 2024	Lucy Watson	Chelsea	Southampton	Loan	
13 September 2024	(Wales) Lily Woodham	(United States) Seattle Reign	Crystal Palace	Loan	
