= List of English women's football transfers winter 2024–25 =

The 2024–25 English women's football winter transfer window ran from 14 September 2024 to 30 January 2025. Players without a club could be signed at any time, clubs could sign players on loan dependent on their league's regulations, and clubs could sign a goalkeeper on an emergency loan if they had no registered senior goalkeeper available. This list includes transfers featuring at least one club from either the Women's Super League or the Women's Championship that were completed after the end of the summer 2024 transfer window on 13 September and before the end of the 2024—25 winter window.

== Transfers ==
All players and clubs without a flag are English.

Date	Name	Moving from	Moving to	Fee	Ref.
15 September 2024	Macy Settle	Everton	Blackburn Rovers	Loan	
17 September 2024	Atlanta Primus	Southampton	Charlton Athletic	Loan	
18 September 2024	Charlotte Clarke	Birmingham City	Wolverhampton Wanderers	Loan	
18 September 2024	Comfort Erhabor	Brighton & Hove Albion	Plymouth Argyle	Loan	
20 September 2024	(Canada) Rylee Foster	(New Zealand) Wellington Phoenix	Everton	Free	
20 September 2024	Jade Pennock	Birmingham City	(Australia) Central Coast Mariners	Loan	
20 September 2024	(Wales) Lauren Thomas	Unattached	Everton	Free	
21 September 2024	(Jamaica) Jade Bailey	Unattached	Sheffield United	Free	
21 September 2024	(New Zealand) Michaela Foster	(New Zealand) Auckland United	Durham	Free	
22 September 2024	Amelia Ajao	London City Lionesses	AFC Wimbledon	Loan	
27 September 2024	(Republic of Ireland) Millie Pullen	Birmingham City	West Bromwich Albion	Dual registration	
28 September 2024	(Australia) Milly Boughton	Tottenham Hotspur	Arsenal	Undisclosed	
28 September 2024	(New Zealand) Jacqui Hand	Unattached	Sheffield United	Free	
11 October 2024	(Nigeria) Rofiat Imuran	(France) Stade de Reims	London City Lionesses	Free	
11 October 2024	Tia Primmer	Unattached	Blackburn Rovers	Free	
31 October 2024	Grace McCatty	Retirement	Sunderland	Free	
16 November 2024	Maddie Oliver	Manchester City	West Bromwich Albion	Dual registration	
1 January 2025	(France) Kelly Gago	(France) Nantes	Everton	Undisclosed	
1 January 2025	(Germany) Rebecca Knaak	(Sweden) FC Rosengård	Manchester City	Undisclosed	
3 January 2025	(Denmark) Olivia Holdt	(Sweden) FC Rosengård	Tottenham Hotspur	Undisclosed	
3 January 2025	Maya Kendell	Bristol City	Exeter City	Loan	
3 January 2025	Fearne Slocombe	Bristol City	Exeter City	Loan	
4 January 2025	(Spain) Martina Fernández	(Spain) Barcelona	Everton	Loan	
6 January 2025	(Republic of Ireland) Lia O'Leary	(Republic of Ireland) Shamrock Rovers	Bristol City	Free	
7 January 2025	Jessica Simpson	Manchester United	Bristol City	Loan	
7 January 2025	(Scotland) Emma Watson	Manchester United	Everton	Loan	
8 January 2025	Kacie Elson	Newcastle United	Middlesbrough	Undisclosed	
8 January 2025	Georgia Gibson	Newcastle United	Middlesbrough	Loan	
8 January 2025	(Scotland) Sam Kerr	(Germany) Bayern Munich	Liverpool	Loan	
8 January 2025	(Wales) Hayley Ladd	Manchester United	Everton	Undisclosed	
9 January 2025	(Spain) Júlia Bartel	Chelsea	Liverpool	Loan	
9 January 2025	Aimee Claypole	Chelsea	Durham	Loan	
9 January 2025	Greta Humphries	Chelsea	Charlton Athletic	Loan	
9 January 2025	Macy Settle	Everton	Blackburn Rovers	Loan	
10 January 2025	Araya Dennis	Tottenham Hotspur	Southampton	Loan	
10 January 2025	Lucy Newell	Manchester United	Blackburn Rovers	Loan	
10 January 2025	Lucy Watson	Chelsea	Ipswich Town	Loan	
10 January 2025	(Jamaica) Siobhan Wilson	Birmingham City	Southampton	Loan	
11 January 2025	(Australia) Bonnie Davies	(Australia) Brisbane Roar	Blackburn Rovers	Free	
11 January 2025	Issy Hobson	Everton	Sheffield United	Loan	
11 January 2025	Ellie Jones	Everton	Sheffield United	Loan	
11 January 2025	Kayla Rendell	Southampton	Manchester United	Undisclosed	
12 January 2025	Kaylee Buckingham	Southampton	AFC Wimbledon	Dual registration	
12 January 2025	(New Zealand) Anna Leat	Aston Villa	Unattached	Free	
15 January 2025	(Netherlands) Lize Kop	Leicester City	Tottenham Hotspur	Undisclosed	
16 January 2025	(Scotland) Jasmine Bull	Bristol City	Portsmouth	Loan	
16 January 2025	(France) Louna Ribadeira	Chelsea	Everton	Loan	
17 January 2025	Emma Thompson	Southampton	Portsmouth	Loan	
17 January 2025	Charlotte Wardlaw	Chelsea	Newcastle United	Undisclosed	
18 January 2025	(Denmark) Kathrine Møller Kühl	Arsenal	(Italy) Roma	Undisclosed	
18 January 2025	(Canada) Clarissa Larisey	(Sweden) BK Häcken	Crystal Palace	Undisclosed	
18 January 2025	Vivienne Lia	Arsenal	Southampton	Loan	
18 January 2025	Ellie Moore	West Ham United	Hashtag United	Dual registration	
18 January 2025	(Japan) Aemu Oyama	(Japan) Waseda University	Manchester City	Free	
18 January 2025	Poppy Pritchard	Manchester City	Newcastle United	Loan	
20 January 2025	Madison Earl	Arsenal	Sheffield United	Loan	
20 January 2025	Freya Gregory	Aston Villa	Newcastle United	Undisclosed	
20 January 2025	(Scotland) Sandy MacIver	Manchester City	(United States) Washington Spirit	Undisclosed	
21 January 2025	(Canada) Rylee Foster	Everton	Durham	Free	
21 January 2025	(Austria) Verena Hanshaw	(Italy) Roma	West Ham United	Undisclosed	
21 January 2025	(Australia) Alanna Kennedy	Manchester City	(United States) Angel City FC	Undisclosed	
21 January 2025	(Republic of Ireland) Ruesha Littlejohn	London City Lionesses	Unattached	Free	
22 January 2025	(Brazil) Kerolin	(United States) North Carolina Courage	Manchester City	Free	
22 January 2025	(Finland) Ria Öling	(Sweden) FC Rosengård	Crystal Palace	Undisclosed	
23 January 2025	Olivia Bramley	Durham	Portsmouth	Loan	
23 January 2025	Freya Godfrey	Arsenal	London City Lionesses	Loan	
23 January 2025	Laila Harbert	Arsenal	Southampton	Loan	
23 January 2025	(Scotland) Abi Harrison	Bristol City	(Scotland) Celtic	Undisclosed	
23 January 2025	(Republic of Ireland) Caitlin Hayes	(Scotland) Celtic	Brighton & Hove Albion	Undisclosed	
23 January 2025	(Japan) Saki Kumagai	(Italy) Roma	London City Lionesses	Undisclosed	
23 January 2025	Georgia Mullett	Aston Villa	Southampton	Loan	
24 January 2025	Elkie Bowyer	Tottenham Hotspur	Ipswich Town	Dual registration	
24 January 2025	(Wales) Olivia Clark	(Netherlands) Twente	Leicester City	Undisclosed	
24 January 2025	(France) Kenza Dali	Aston Villa	(United States) San Diego Wave	Undisclosed	
24 January 2025	(Wales) Esther Morgan	(Scotland) Heart of Midlothian	Sheffield United	Undisclosed	
24 January 2025	(Sweden) Emilia Pelgander	Leicester City	(Sweden) FC Rosengård	Loan	
24 January 2025	(United States) Katelin Talbert	West Ham United	Aston Villa	Loan	
25 January 2025	Emma Bissell	Everton	Charlton Athletic	Undisclosed	
25 January 2025	(Finland) Eva Nyström	(Sweden) Hammarby IF	West Ham United	Undisclosed	
26 January 2025	(United States) Naomi Girma	(United States) San Diego Wave	Chelsea	£900,000	
27 January 2025	(France) Inès Belloumou	West Ham United	(Sweden) Malmö	Loan	
27 January 2025	(Sweden) Josefine Rybrink	(Sweden) BK Häcken	Tottenham Hotspur	Free	
27 January 2025	Tatiana Saunders	Durham	Retired		
28 January 2025	(Scotland) Amelia Oldroyd	Manchester United	Burnley	Dual registration	
28 January 2025	Sophia Poor	Aston Villa	London City Lionesses	Loan	
30 January 2025	(Spain) Alejandra Bernabé	Chelsea	Liverpool	Loan	
30 January 2025	Shannon Cooke	West Ham United	Birmingham City	Loan	
30 January 2025	(Iceland) Hlín Eiríksdóttir	(Sweden) Kristianstads	Leicester City	Undisclosed	
30 January 2025	Comfort Erhabor	Brighton & Hove Albion	Portsmouth	Loan	
30 January 2025	(Wales) Alice Griffiths	Southampton	Durham	Loan	
30 January 2025	Sophie Haywood	Newcastle United	Nottingham Forest	Loan	
30 January 2025	Chloe Kelly	Manchester City	Arsenal	Loan	
30 January 2025	(Netherlands) Femke Liefting	(Netherlands) AZ Alkmaar	Chelsea	Undisclosed	
30 January 2025	Malaika Meena	(United States) Wake Forest Demon Deacons	Bristol City	Free	
30 January 2025	(United States) Jenna Nighswonger	(United States) Gotham FC	Arsenal	£80,360	
30 January 2025	(Netherlands) Nadine Noordam	(Netherlands) Ajax	Brighton & Hove Albion	Undisclosed	
30 January 2025	(Netherlands) Aniek Nouwen	Chelsea	Crystal Palace	Loan	
30 January 2025	(France) Ève Périsset	Chelsea	(France) Strasbourg	Free	
30 January 2025	Connie Scofield	London City Lionesses	Sheffield United	Loan	
30 January 2025	(China) Wang Shuang	Tottenham Hotspur	(China) Wuhan Chegu Jiangda	Undisclosed	
30 January 2025	(Jamaica) Allyson Swaby	(Italy) Milan	Crystal Palace	Undisclosed	
30 January 2025	(Colombia) Karla Torres	(Colombia) Santa Fe	Leicester City	Loan	
30 January 2025	Keira Walsh	(Spain) Barcelona	Chelsea	£460,000	
30 January 2025	(Austria) Laura Wienroither	Arsenal	Manchester City	Loan	
30 January 2025	Louanne Worsey	Birmingham City	Burnley	Loan	
30 January 2025	(Australia) Emily van Egmond	(United States) San Diego Wave	Birmingham City	Free	
31 January 2025	Nicole Barrett	Portsmouth	Oxford United	Loan	
31 January 2025	Hermione Cull	London City Lionesses	Watford	Loan	
31 January 2025	(Republic of Ireland) Emily Murphy	(United States) Wake Forest Demon Deacons	Newcastle United	Free	
2 February 2025	(Norway) Maren Mjelde	(Norway) Arna-Bjørnar	Everton	Free	
