= 2024–25 Brighton & Hove Albion W.F.C. season =

Brighton & Hove Albion
2024–25 season
- Chairman: Tony Bloom
- Manager: Dario Vidošić
- Stadium: Broadfield Stadium, Crawley
- Women's Super League: 5th
- FA Cup: Fifth round
- League Cup: Quarter-finals
- Top goalscorer: League: Fran Kirby; Nikita Parris (7 goals each); All: Nikita Parris (12 goals)
- Highest home attendance: 8,369 (Falmer Stadium); 4,786 (Broadfield Stadium)
- Lowest home attendance: 2,082
- Average home league attendance: 3,647
- Biggest win: 4–0 vs Everton (WSL – 21 September 2024)
- Biggest defeat: 5–0 vs Arsenal (WSL – 8 November 2024)
Home colours	Away colours	Third colours
- All statistics correct as of 10 May 2025.

The 2024–25 Brighton & Hove Albion W.F.C. season was the club's 34th season in existence and their seventh in the Women's Super League, the highest level of the football pyramid. Along with competing in the WSL, the club competed in two domestic cup competitions: the FA Cup and the League Cup.

On 10 July 2024, Dario Vidošić was appointed as head coach on a three-year contract.

== Squad ==
As of 2 February 2025

Note: Flags indicate national team as defined under FIFA eligibility rules; some limited exceptions apply. Players may hold more than one non-FIFA nationality.

No.	Pos.	Nation	Player
2	DF	NOR	Maria Thorisdottir
3	DF	ENG	Poppy Pattinson
5	DF	NOR	Guro Bergsvand
6	MF	ESP	Vicky Losada (captain)
7	FW	TAN	Aisha Masaka
8	FW	GER	Pauline Bremer
9	FW	ENG	Nikita Parris
10	MF	SRB	Jelena Čanković
11	FW	JPN	Kiko Seike
12	DF	IRL	Caitlin Hayes
14	FW	ENG	Fran Kirby
15	MF	NED	Nadine Noordam
16	DF	COL	Jorelyn Carabalí

No.	Pos.	Nation	Player
17	MF	ENG	Bex Rayner
18	MF	ENG	Maisie Symonds
19	DF	NED	Marisa Olislagers
20	FW	ESP	Bruna Vilamala (on loan from Barcelona)
21	MF	USA	Madison Haley
22	MF	SRB	Dejana Stefanović
23	DF	NED	Marit Auée
27	DF	SCO	Rachel McLauchlan
28	GK	GER	Melina Loeck
32	GK	ENG	Sophie Baggaley
33	MF	AUS	Charlize Rule
59	FW	ENG	Michelle Agyemang (on loan from Arsenal)

== Pre-season and friendlies ==
Win Draw Loss Fixtures

22 August 2024 Friendly	Brighton & Hove Albion	4–0	Portsmouth	Lancing
	Kirby; Masaka; Li; McEwen	Report		Stadium: American Express Elite Football Performance Centre; Attendance: 0 (Behind closed doors)

28 August 2024 Friendly	Málaga	0–7	Brighton & Hove Albion	Spain
		Report	Haley; Symonds; Bremer; Dent; McLauchlan	Attendance: 0 (Behind closed doors)

31 August 2024 Friendly	Granada	2–3	Brighton & Hove Albion	Spain
	Requena; Bradić	Report	Seike; Bremer	Attendance: 0 (Behind closed doors)

8 Sept 2024 Friendly	Brighton & Hove Albion	–	Crystal Palace	Crawley
				Stadium: Broadfield_Stadium; Attendance: Behind-closed-doors
Note: No official scoreline released

== Competitions ==
=== Overall record ===
Competition	First match	Last match	Starting round	Final position	Record							
Competition	First match	Last match	Starting round	Final position	Pld	W	D	L	GF	GA	GD	Win %
Women's Super League	21 September 2024	10 May 2025	Matchday 1	5th	22	8	4	10	35	41	−6	36.36
Women's FA Cup	29 January 2025	8 February 2025	Fourth round	Fifth Round	2	1	0	1	6	4	+2	50.00
FA Women's League Cup	2 October 2024	22 January 2025	Group stage	Quarter-final	4	2	1	1	9	6	+3	50.00
Total					28	11	5	12	50	51	−1	39.29

Last updated: 10 May 2025
Source: Soccerway

=== Women's Super League ===
==== Results summary ====
Overall								Home						Away					
Pld	W	D	L	GF	GA	GD	Pts	W	D	L	GF	GA	GD	W	D	L	GF	GA	GD
22	8	4	10	35	41	−6	28	5	4	2	23	15	+8	3	0	8	12	26	−14

Last updated: 10 May 2025.
Source: Women's Super League

==== Results by matchday ====
Round	1	2	3	4	5	6	7	8	9	10	11	12	13	14	15	16	17	18	19	20	21	22
Ground	H	A	H	A	H	H	A	H	A	H	A	A	H	A	H	A	A	H	H	A	H	A
Result	W	L	W	W	D	W	L	W	L	D	L	L	D	L	D	W	L	L	L	W	W	L
Position	1	6	4	4	4	3	3	3	5	5	5	5	5	5	5	5	5	5	6	5	5	5
Points	3	3	6	9	10	13	13	16	16	17	17	17	18	18	19	22	22	22	22	25	28	28

Source: Women's Super League
A = Away; H = Home; W = Win; D = Draw; L = Loss

==== Results ====
21 September 2024 1	Brighton & Hove Albion	4–0	Everton	Crawley
12:30 BST	Seike 29', 56', 75'; Kirby 68' (pen.); Symonds (yellow card) 81'; Čanković (yellow card) 90+4'	Report	Vanhaevermaet (yellow card) 65'	Stadium: Broadfield Stadium; Attendance: 2,125; Referee: Lauren Impey

29 September 2024 2	Manchester City	1–0	Brighton & Hove Albion	Manchester
12:30 BST	Shaw 44'	Report	Pattinson (yellow card) 33'	Stadium: Academy Stadium; Attendance: 3,727; Referee: Stacey Pearson

5 October 2024 3	Brighton & Hove Albion	4–2	Aston Villa	Crawley
12:30 BST	Parris 15'; Bremer 38'; Pattinson (yellow card) 77' (yellow-red card) 90+4'; Kirby 79' (pen.); Agyemang (yellow card) 90+1', (goal) 90+7'	Report	Daly 13', 55' (pen.); Tomás (red card) 76'; Robinson (yellow card) 77'	Stadium: Broadfield Stadium; Attendance: 2,152; Referee: Ryan Atkin

13 October 2024 4	Crystal Palace	0–1	Brighton & Hove Albion	London (Sutton)
14:00 BST	Green (yellow card) 16'; Gejl (yellow card) 56'	Report	Vilamala 35'	Stadium: VBS Community Stadium; Attendance: 1,166; Referee: Kirsty Dowle

19 October 2024 5	Brighton & Hove Albion	1–1	Manchester United	Falmer
12:30 BST	Thorisdottir (yellow card) 19'; Parris 52'; Pattinson (yellow card) 90+3'	Report	Clinton 10', (yellow card) 70'; Naalsund (yellow card) 34'; Mannion (yellow card) 85'	Stadium: Falmer Stadium; Attendance: 8,369; Referee: Stacey Fullicks

3 November 2024 6	Brighton & Hove Albion	1–0	Leicester City	Crawley
14:00 GMT	Parris 20'; Olislagers (yellow card) 43'; Kirby (yellow card) 79'; Losada (yellow card) 90+7'	Report		Stadium: Broadfield Stadium; Attendance: 2,082; Referee: Adewunmi Soneye

8 November 2024 7	Arsenal	5–0	Brighton & Hove Albion	London (Holloway)
19:00 GMT	Mead 13'; Foord 22'; Maanum 25'; Hurtig 76'; Russo 90+5' (pen.)	Report	Bergsvand (yellow card) 40'; Haley (yellow card) 64'	Stadium: Emirates Stadium; Attendance: 22,467; Referee: Amy Fearn

16 November 2024 8	Brighton & Hove Albion	3–2	West Ham United	Falmer
12:30 GMT	McLauchlan 29'; Seike 60'; Čanković (yellow card) 76'; Kirby 82'	Report	Asseyi (yellow card) 24'; Zadorsky (yellow card) 56'; Gorry 64', 69'	Stadium: Falmer Stadium; Attendance: 4,638; Referee: Lisa Benn

8 December 2024 9	Chelsea	4–2	Brighton & Hove Albion	London (Kingston upon Thames)
14:00 GMT	Cuthbert (yellow card) 19'; Nüsken 35', 90+1', (yellow card) 90+4'; Beever-Jones 40'; Rytting Kaneryd 51'	Report	Čanković 43'; Parris (yellow card) 64'; Seike 71'; Carabalí (yellow card) 75'	Stadium: Kingsmeadow; Attendance: 3,765; Referee: Stacey Pearson

14 December 2024 10	Brighton & Hove Albion	1–1	Tottenham Hotspur	Crawley
17:30 GMT	Carabalí (yellow card) 46'; Olislagers 83'	Report	Neville (yellow card) 44'; Nildén (yellow card) 68'; England 75'	Stadium: Broadfield Stadium; Attendance: 2,083; Referee: Lisa Benn

17 January 2025 11	Liverpool	2–1	Brighton & Hove Albion	St Helens
19:00 GMT	Smith 31', (yellow card) 35'; Carabalí 82' (o.g.); Kiernan (yellow card) 90+5'	Report	Parris 66'; Pattinson (yellow card) 80'; Haley (yellow card) 90+7'	Stadium: Totally Wicked Stadium; Attendance: Not Recorded; Referee: Kirsty Dowle

26 January 2025 12	Manchester United	3–0	Brighton & Hove Albion	Leigh
18:45 GMT	Toone 2'; Miyazawa 11'; George (yellow card) 20'; Bizet 69'	Report	Haley (yellow card) 33'; Agyemang (yellow card) 77'	Stadium: Leigh Sports Village; Attendance: 3,027; Referee: Cheryl Foster

2 February 2025 13	Brighton & Hove Albion	1–1	Crystal Palace	Crawley
14:00 GMT	Woodham 18' (o.g.); Symonds (red card) 48'	Report	Majasaari (yellow card) 45+1'; Potter (yellow card) 58'; Woodham (yellow card) 59'; Larisey (yellow card) 66'; Cato 88'	Stadium: Broadfield Stadium; Attendance: 2,345; Referee: Stacey Fullicks

16 February 2025 14	West Ham United	3–1	Brighton & Hove Albion	London (Dagenham)
15:00 GMT	Martinez 11'; Hanshaw (yellow card) 45+1'; Ueki 64'; Asseyi 68' (pen.)	Report	Parris 14'; Losada (yellow card) 29'; McLauchlan (yellow card) 60'	Stadium: Chigwell Construction Stadium; Attendance: 1,460; Referee: Stacey Pearson

2 March 2025 15	Brighton & Hove Albion	2–2	Chelsea	Crawley
15:00 GMT	Olislagers 22'; McLauchlan (yellow card) 29'; Losada 42'	Report	Baltimore 16'; James 61', (yellow card) 90+10'	Stadium: Broadfield Stadium; Attendance: 4,490; Referee: Kirsty Dowle

16 March 2025 16	Tottenham Hotspur	0–1	Brighton & Hove Albion	London (Leyton)
15:00 GMT	Summanen (yellow card) 52'; Raso (yellow card) 79'	Report	Kirby 32'; Thorisdottir (yellow card) 45+5'; Noordam (yellow card) 69'; Parris (yellow card) 83'; Agyemang (yellow card) 85'	Stadium: Brisbane Road; Attendance: 1,425; Referee: Ryan Atkin

23 March 2025 17	Leicester City	3–2	Brighton & Hove Albion	Leicester
15:00 GMT	O'Brien 11'; Takarada 35'; McLauchlan 45+5' (o.g.); Ale (yellow card) 89'; Thibaud (yellow card) 90+6'	Report	Symonds (yellow card) 43'; Auée (yellow card) 61'; Haley 73'; Kirby 81' (pen.)	Stadium: King Power Stadium; Referee: Amy Fearn

30 March 2025 18	Brighton & Hove Albion	1–2	Manchester City	Crawley
14:00 BST	Rule 90+2'; Hayes (yellow card) 90+4'	Report	Prior (yellow card) 29'; Casparij 37'; Coombs (yellow card) 55'; Miedema 90', (yellow card) 90+10'	Stadium: Broadfield Stadium; Attendance: 2,480; Referee: Stacey Fullicks

19 April 2025 19	Brighton & Hove Albion	1–2	Liverpool	Falmer
12:30 BST	Pattinson (yellow card) 45+2'; Agyemang 48'; Parris (yellow card) 65'; Kirby (yellow card) 73'	Report	Smith 2'; Kiernan 43'; Kapocs (yellow card) 57'; Laws (yellow card) 88'; Hinds (yellow card) 90+6'	Stadium: Falmer Stadium; Attendance: 4,566; Referee: Lisa Benn
Note: Fixture was initially scheduled for 20 April at the Broadfield Stadium, but was moved to be played at the Falmer Stadium.

27 April 2025 20	Everton	2–3	Brighton & Hove Albion	Liverpool
14:00 BST	Holmgaard 9', (yellow card) 90+1'; Snoeijs 23'; Stenevik (yellow card) 61'; Wheeler (yellow card) 65'	Report	Agyemang 21'; Auée (yellow card) 29'; Kirby 44'; Symonds (yellow card) 55'; Hayes (yellow card) 80'; Parris 90+3'	Stadium: Walton Hall Park; Attendance: 843; Referee: Megan Wilson

5 May 2025 21	Brighton & Hove Albion	4–2	Arsenal	Crawley
16:00 BST	Kirby 16'; Olislagers (yellow card) 21'; Čanković 43', 52'; Thorisdottir (yellow card) 45'; Seike 54'; Hayes (yellow card) 85'; Noordam (yellow card) 86'	Report	Foord 29'; Caldentey 90+3'	Stadium: Broadfield Stadium; Attendance: 4,786; Referee: Amy Fearn

10 May 2025 22	Aston Villa	3–1	Brighton & Hove Albion	Birmingham
12:30 BST	Salmon 5'; Daly 44', (yellow card) 47'; Pacheco 74'	Report	Agyemang (yellow card) 42'; Stefanović (yellow card) 90+2'; Parris 90+4'	Stadium: Villa Park; Attendance: 3,492; Referee: Lisa Benn

==== League table ====
Pos	Team	Pld	W	D	L	GF	GA	GD	Pts	Qualification or relegation
3	Manchester United	22	13	5	4	41	16	+25	44	Qualification for the Champions League second qualifying round
4	Manchester City	22	13	4	5	49	28	+21	43	
5	Brighton & Hove Albion	22	8	4	10	35	41	−6	28	
6	Aston Villa	22	7	4	11	32	44	−12	25	
7	Liverpool	22	7	4	11	22	37	−15	25	

Source: The Football Association
Rules for classification: 1) Points; 2) Goal difference; 3) Number of goals scored.

=== FA Cup ===
As a member of the Women's Super League Brighton & Hove Albion enter the FA Cup in the fourth round.

29 January 2025 Fourth round	Brighton & Hove Albion	4–1	Durham	Lancing
19:00 GMT	Vilamala 6'; Agyemang 19' (pen.); Bergsvand 21'; Parris 90+6'	Report	Foster (yellow card) 67'; Blake 71'; Ayre (yellow card) 72'	Stadium: American Express Elite Football Performance Centre; Attendance: 262; Referee: Sophie Dennington
Note: Fixture was originally scheduled for 12 January 2025 but was postponed due to a frozen pitch. The venue was changed from the Broadfield Stadium due to heavy rainfall

8 February 2025 Fifth round	Aston Villa	3–2	Brighton & Hove Albion	Walsall
12:00 GMT	Patten (yellow card) 36', (goal) 45+2'; Daly 50'; Grant 55'; Mayling (yellow card) 81'; Baijings (yellow card) 90+6'		Parris 45', 72'; Thorisdottir (yellow card) 56'	Stadium: Bescot Stadium; Attendance: 821; Referee: Melissa Burgin

=== League Cup ===
==== Group stage ====
2 October 2024 Group stage	Birmingham City	0–3	Brighton & Hove Albion	Birmingham
19:00 BST	Fuso (yellow card) 16'; Choe (yellow card) 45+1'	Report	Bergsvand 71'; Symonds 74'; Olislagers (yellow card) 77'; Kirby 86'	Stadium: St Andrew's; Attendance: 842; Referee: Amy Fearn

24 November 2024 Group stage	Brighton & Hove Albion	0–0 (3–4 p)	Leicester City	Crawley
14:00 GMT		Report	Bott (yellow card) 60'; Chossenotte (yellow card) 88'	Stadium: Broadfield Stadium; Attendance: 1,069; Referee: Joanne Horwood
	Penalties
	Parris (penalty scored); Čanković (penalty scored); Seike (penalty scored); Agyemang (penalty missed); Symonds (penalty missed)		(penalty scored) Thibaud; (penalty scored) Mace; (penalty missed) Momiki; (penalty scored) Cayman; (penalty scored) Rose

11 December 2024 Group stage	Brighton & Hove Albion	6–2	Bristol City	Crawley
19:00 GMT	Vilamala 7'; McLauchlan 28'; Bremer 42'; Agyemang 48'; Parris 69', 86'	Report	Teisar 10'; Bull 51'	Stadium: Broadfield Stadium; Attendance: 710; Referee: Joanne Horwood

Pos	Team	Pld	W	WPEN	LPEN	L	GF	GA	GD	Pts	Qualification	BHA	LEI	BIR	BRI
1	Brighton & Hove Albion	3	2	0	1	0	9	2	+7	7	Advanced to knock-out stage	—	0–0	–	6–2
2	Leicester City	3	1	1	1	0	6	3	+3	6		–	—	5–2	1–1
3	Birmingham City	3	1	0	0	2	5	9	−4	3		0–3	–	—	–
4	Bristol City	3	0	1	0	2	4	10	−6	2		–	–	1–3	—

Updated to match(es) played on 11 December 2024. Source: Women's League Cup
Rules for classification: 1) Points; 2) Goal difference; 3) Number of goals scored; 4) Number of wins; 5) Head-to-head record

==== Knock-out Stage ====
22 January 2025 Quarter-final	Brighton & Hove Albion	0–4	Arsenal	Crawley
19:15 GMT	McLauchlan (yellow card) 89'	Report	Reid (yellow card) 52'; Maanum 65'; McCabe 68'; Cooney-Cross 70'; Caldentey 83'	Stadium: Broadfield Stadium; Attendance: 2,115; Referee: Lisa Benn

== Squad statistics ==
Italics indicate a loaned in player.

=== Appearances ===
As of 10 May 2025

Starting appearances are listed first, followed by substitute appearances after the + symbol where applicable.

No.	Pos	Nat	Player	Total		WSL		FA Cup		League Cup	
No.	Pos	Nat	Player	Apps	Goals	Apps	Goals	Apps	Goals	Apps	Goals
2	DF	(Norway) NOR	Maria Thorisdottir	16	0	13	0	2	0	1	0
3	DF	(England) ENG	Poppy Pattinson	24	0	18	0	1+1	0	4	0
5	DF	(Norway) NOR	Guro Bergsvand	28	2	22	0	2	1	4	1
6	MF	(Spain) ESP	Vicky Losada	18	1	15	1	1	0	2	0
7	MF	(Tanzania) TAN	Aisha Masaka	2	0	0+1	0	0	0	0+1	0
8	FW	(Germany) GER	Pauline Bremer	22	2	8+9	1	1+1	0	1+2	1
9	FW	(England) ENG	Nikita Parris	28	12	20+2	7	1+1	3	1+3	2
10	MF	(Serbia) SRB	Jelena Čanković	21	3	11+4	3	2	0	2+2	0
11	FW	(Japan) JPN	Kiko Seike	21	6	12+6	6	0	0	3	0
12	DF	(Republic of Ireland) IRL	Caitlin Hayes	7	0	4+2	0	0+1	0	0	0
14	MF	(England) ENG	Fran Kirby	18	8	15+2	7	0	0	0+1	1
15	MF	(Netherlands) NED	Nadine Noordam	8	0	6+1	0	1	0	0	0
16	DF	(Colombia) COL	Jorelyn Carabalí	19	0	10+3	0	2	0	1+3	0
17	MF	(England) ENG	Bex Rayner	6	0	0+4	0	1	0	1	0
18	MF	(England) ENG	Maisie Symonds	22	1	10+8	0	1	0	2+1	1
19	DF	(Netherlands) NED	Marisa Olislagers	26	2	17+3	2	1+1	0	3+1	0
20	FW	(Spain) ESP	Bruna Vilamala	17	3	9+4	1	1	1	3	1
21	MF	(United States) USA	Madison Haley	19	1	9+5	1	1+1	0	3	0
22	MF	(Serbia) SRB	Dejana Stefanović	11	0	0+8	0	0+2	0	0+1	0
23	DF	(Netherlands) NED	Marit Auée	8	0	5+2	0	0	0	1	0
27	DF	(Scotland) SCO	Rachel McLauchlan	24	2	12+6	1	1+1	0	4	1
28	GK	(Germany) GER	Melina Loeck	14	0	8	0	2	0	4	0
32	GK	(England) ENG	Sophie Baggaley	14	0	14	0	0	0	0	0
33	MF	(Australia) AUS	Charlize Rule	4	1	0+4	1	0	0	0	0
47	MF	(England) ENG	Evie Milner	1	0	0	0	0	0	0+1	0
59	FW	(England) ENG	Michelle Agyemang	22	5	3+14	3	1+1	1	3	1
61	MF	(England) ENG	May Balmer	1	0	0	0	0	0	0+1	0
63	FW	(England) ENG	Olivia Johnson	1	0	0	0	0	0	0+1	0

=== Goalscorers ===
As of 10 May 2025

Rnk	No	Pos	Nat	Name	WSL	FA Cup	League Cup	Total
1	9	FW	(England)	Nikita Parris	7	3	2	12
2	14	MF	(England)	Fran Kirby	7	0	1	8
3	11	FW	(Japan)	Kiko Seike	6	0	0	6
4	59	FW	(England)	Michelle Agyemang	3	1	1	5
5	10	MF	(Serbia)	Jelena Čanković	3	0	0	3
5	20	FW	(Spain)	Bruna Vilamala	1	1	1	3
6	5	DF	(Norway)	Guro Bergsvand	0	1	1	2
6	8	FW	(Germany)	Pauline Bremer	1	0	1	2
6	19	DF	(Netherlands)	Marisa Olislagers	2	0	0	2
6	27	DF	(Scotland)	Rachel McLauchlan	1	0	1	2
7	6	MF	(Spain)	Vicky Losada	1	0	0	1
7	18	MF	(England)	Maisie Symonds	0	0	1	1
7	21	MF	(United States)	Madison Haley	1	0	0	1
7	33	MF	(Australia)	Charlize Rule	1	0	0	1
Own goals					1	0	0	1
Total					35	6	9	50

=== Assists ===
As of 10 May 2025

Rank	No.	Pos.	Nat.	Player	WSL	FA Cup	League Cup	Total
1	9	FW	(England)	Nikita Parris	5	0	0	5
1	27	DF	(Scotland)	Rachel McLauchlan	5	0	0	5
2	11	FW	(Japan)	Kiko Seike	4	0	0	4
2	19	DF	(Netherlands)	Marisa Olislagers	1	1	2	4
2	20	FW	(Spain)	Bruna Vilamala	1	0	3	4
3	3	DF	(England)	Poppy Pattinson	2	0	0	2
3	10	MF	(Serbia)	Jelena Čanković	2	0	0	2
3	14	FW	(England)	Fran Kirby	2	0	0	2
3	18	MF	(England)	Maisie Symonds	2	0	0	2
3	21	MF	(United States)	Madison Haley	0	1	1	2
4	8	FW	(Germany)	Pauline Bremer	1	0	0	1
4	23	DF	(Netherlands)	Marit Auée	1	0	0	1
4	59	FW	(England)	Michelle Agyemang	1	0	0	1
Totals					27	2	6	35

=== Clean sheets ===
As of 10 May 2025

Rank	No.	Pos.	Nat.	Player	Matches played	Clean sheet %	WSL	FA Cup	League Cup	Total
1	28	GK	(Germany)	Melina Loeck	14	21.43%	1	0	2	3
1	32	GK	(England)	Sophie Baggaley	14	14.29%	3	0	0	3
Totals					28	21.43%	4	0	2	6

=== Disciplinary record ===
As of 10 May 2025

No.	Pos.	Nat.	Player	WSL			FA Cup			League Cup			Total		
No.	Pos.	Nat.	Player	Booked	(yellow card) (yellow-red card)	Sent off (straight red)	Booked	(yellow card) (yellow-red card)	Sent off (straight red)	Booked	(yellow card) (yellow-red card)	Sent off (straight red)	Booked	(yellow card) (yellow-red card)	Sent off (straight red)
2	DF	(Norway)	Maria Thorisdottir	3	0	0	1	0	0	0	0	0	4	0	0
3	DF	(England)	Poppy Pattinson	4	1	0	0	0	0	0	0	0	4	1	0
5	DF	(Norway)	Guro Bergsvand	1	0	0	0	0	0	0	0	0	1	0	0
6	MF	(Spain)	Vicky Losada	2	0	0	0	0	0	0	0	0	2	0	0
9	FW	(England)	Nikita Parris	3	0	0	0	0	0	0	0	0	3	0	0
10	MF	(Serbia)	Jelena Čanković	2	0	0	0	0	0	0	0	0	2	0	0
12	DF	(Republic of Ireland)	Caitlin Hayes	3	0	0	0	0	0	0	0	0	3	0	0
14	MF	(England)	Fran Kirby	2	0	0	0	0	0	0	0	0	2	0	0
15	MF	(Netherlands)	Nadine Noordam	2	0	0	0	0	0	0	0	0	2	0	0
16	DF	(Colombia)	Jorelyn Carabalí	2	0	0	0	0	0	0	0	0	2	0	0
18	MF	(England)	Maisie Symonds	3	0	1	0	0	0	0	0	0	3	0	1
19	DF	(Netherlands)	Marisa Olislagers	2	0	0	0	0	0	1	0	0	3	0	0
21	MF	(United States)	Madison Haley	3	0	0	0	0	0	0	0	0	3	0	0
22	MF	(Serbia)	Dejana Stefanović	1	0	0	0	0	0	0	0	0	1	0	0
23	DF	(Netherlands)	Marit Auée	2	0	0	0	0	0	0	0	0	2	0	0
27	DF	(Scotland)	Rachel McLauchlan	2	0	0	0	0	0	1	0	0	3	0	0
59	FW	(England)	Michelle Agyemang	4	0	0	0	0	0	0	0	0	4	0	0
Total				41	1	1	1	0	0	2	0	0	43	1	1

== Transfers ==
=== In ===
Date	Position	Nationality	Name	From	Ref.
1 July 2024	DF	(Netherlands)	Marisa Olislagers	(Netherlands) Twente	
4 July 2024	MF	(England)	Fran Kirby	(England) Chelsea	
4 July 2024	FW	(Japan)	Kiko Seike	(Japan) Urawa Red Diamonds	
9 July 2024	DF	(Netherlands)	Marit Auée	(Netherlands) Twente	
11 July 2024	DF	(Scotland)	Rachel McLauchlan	(Scotland) Rangers	
12 July 2024	GK	(England)	Hannah Poulter	(United States) USC Trojans	
12 July 2024	MF	(England)	Bex Rayner	(England) Sheffield United	
17 July 2024	FW	(Tanzania)	Aisha Masaka	(Sweden) BK Häcken	
23 August 2024	MF	(Serbia)	Jelena Čanković	(England) Chelsea	
13 September 2024	FW	(England)	Nikita Parris	(England) Manchester United	
23 January 2025	DF	(Republic of Ireland)	Caitlin Hayes	(Scotland) Celtic	
31 January 2025	MF	(Netherlands)	Nadine Noordam	(Netherlands) Ajax	

=== Loans in ===
Date	Position	Nationality	Name	From	Until	Ref.
24 August 2024	FW	(Spain)	Bruna Vilamala	(Spain) Barcelona	End of season	
13 September 2024	FW	(England)	Michelle Agyemang	(England) Arsenal	End of season	

=== Out ===
Date	Position	Nationality	Name	To	Ref.
30 June 2024	MF	(England)	Lulu Jarvis	(England) Plymouth Argyle	
30 June 2024	DF	(Sweden)	Emma Kullberg	(Italy) Juventus	
30 June 2024	MF	(Portugal)	Tatiana Pinto	(Spain) Atlético Madrid	
30 June 2024	MF	(England)	Katie Robinson	(England) Aston Villa	
30 June 2024	MF	(Greece)	Veatriki Sarri	(England) Everton	
1 July 2024	MF	(Hungary)	Kayla Ginger	(United States) South Alabama Jaguars	
1 July 2024	DF	(England)	Issy Payne	(United States) Saint Peter's Peacocks	
1 July 2024	FW	(Wales)	Farrah Stephens-Martin	(United States) Kansas State Wildcats	
17 July 2024	FW	(Norway)	Elisabeth Terland	(England) Manchester United	
19 July 2024	MF	(Guernsey)	Sydney Schreimaier	(England) Lewes	
24 July 2024	FW	(Sweden)	Julia Zigiotti Olme	(Germany) Bayern Munich	
26 July 2024	MF	(England)	Rubie Harris	(England) West Bromwich Albion	
7 August 2024	DF	(England)	Hazel Cotton	(England) Loughborough Lightning	
9 August 2024	MF	(England)	Lucy White	(England) Loughborough Lightning	
6 September 2024	GK	(England)	Katie Startup	(England) Manchester City	
13 September 2024	FW	(South Korea)	Lee Geum-min	(England) Birmingham City	

=== Loans out ===
Date	Position	Nationality	Name	To	Until	Ref.
16 August 2024	MF	(England)	Clarabella Hall (Note: Dual registration)	(England) Watford	End of season	
7 September 2024	MF	(England)	Libby Bance	(England) Bristol City	End of season	
13 September 2024	FW	(England)	Lily Dent	(England) Portsmouth	End of season	
13 September 2024	DF	(England)	Grace McEwan	(England) Portsmouth	End of season	
13 September 2024	DF	(China)	Li Mengwen	(England) West Ham United	End of season	
18 September 2024	GK	(Nigeria)	Comfort Erhabor	(England) Plymouth Argyle	30 January 2025 (Note: On 30 January 2025, Erhabor was recalled from her season-long loan at Plymouth Argyle and subsequently was loaned to Portsmouth)	
18 January 2025	GK	(England)	Hannah Poulter	(England) Portsmouth	End of season	
30 January 2025	GK	(Nigeria)	Comfort Erhabor	(England) Portsmouth	End of Season	

== Results by team ==
Team	Pld	W	D	L	GF	GA	GD	WPCT
(England) Arsenal	2	0	0	2	0	9	−9	0.00
(England) Aston Villa	1	1	0	0	4	2	+2	100.00
(England) Birmingham City	1	1	0	0	3	0	+3	100.00
(England) Bristol City	1	1	0	0	6	2	+4	100.00
(England) Chelsea	1	0	0	1	2	4	−2	0.00
(England) Crystal Palace	2	1	1	0	2	1	+1	50.00
(England) Durham	1	1	0	0	4	1	+3	100.00
(England) Everton	1	1	0	0	4	0	+4	100.00
(Spain) Granada	1	1	0	0	3	2	+1	100.00
(England) Leicester City	2	1	1	0	1	0	+1	50.00
(England) Liverpool	1	0	0	1	1	2	−1	0.00
(Spain) Málaga	1	1	0	0	7	0	+7	100.00
(England) Manchester City	1	0	0	1	1	0	+1	0.00
(England) Manchester United	2	0	1	1	1	4	−3	0.00
(England) Portsmouth	1	1	0	0	4	0	+4	100.00
(England) Tottenham Hotspur	1	0	1	0	1	1	0	0.00
(England) West Ham United	1	1	0	0	3	2	+1	100.00
Total	21	11	4	6	47	30	+17	52.38

Updated to match(es) played on 2 February 2025. Source: Preseason and Competitions
