= Greta Humphries =

English footballer (born 2005)

Personal information
- Full name: Greta Isadora Humphries
- Date of birth: 5 August 2005 (age 21)
- Place of birth: Epsom, England
- Height: 1.78 m (5 ft 10 in)
- Position: Centre-back

Team information
- Current team: Portsmouth
- Number: 15

Youth career
- Tottenham Hotspur
- 2022–2024: Chelsea

Senior career*
Years	Team	Apps	(Gls)
2024–2025	Chelsea	0	(0)
2024–2025	→ Bristol City (loan)	4	(0)
2025	→ Charlton Athletic (loan)	5	(0)
2025–	→ Portsmouth	0	(0)
- * Club domestic league appearances and goals as of 14:18, 27 August 2025 (UTC)

Greta Isadora Humphries (born 5 August 2005) is an English professional footballer who plays as a centre-back for Women's Super League 2 club Portsmouth. She previously played on loan for Bristol City and Charlton Athletic.

== Youth career ==
Humphries began her youth career with Tottenham Hotspur, where she made 16 appearances in the WSL Academy League. In 2022 she joined the Chelsea academy and made 17 appearances in the 2022–23 season and helped the team to win the FA WSL Academy Cup in the 2023–24 season.

== Club career ==
On 9 July 2024 Humphries signed her first professional contract with Chelsea, a one-year deal with the option to extend. A month later, she signed for Bristol City on loan for the 2024–25 season. Chelsea recalled Humphries from this loan on 9 January 2025, instead loaning her to Charlton Athletic for the remainder of the season. She then left Chelsea in June 2025, on expiry of her initial contract.

On 27 August 2025 Humphries signed a one-year deal with Women's Super League 2 club Portsmouth.

== Personal life ==
Humphries was diagnosed with type 1 diabetes when she was 5 years old and uses an insulin pump.
