= Aisha Masaka =

Tanzanian international striker

Personal information
- Full name: Aisha Khamis Masaka
- Date of birth: 10 November 2003 (age 23)
- Place of birth: Singida Region, Tanzania
- Height: 1.75 m (5 ft 9 in)
- Positions: Forward; winger

Team information
- Current team: Brighton & Hove Albion
- Number: 7

Youth career
- Alliance Academy, Mwanza
- 2018–2021: Majengo Queens

Senior career*
| Years | Team | Apps | (Gls) |
| –2021 | Young Africans | | |
| 2022–2024 | BK Häcken | 14 | (5) |
| 2024– | Brighton & Hove Albion | 1 | (0) |

International career^{‡}
| 2021– | Tanzania | 16 | (9) |
- * Club domestic league appearances and goals as of 8 November 2024 ‡ National team caps and goals as of 18 April 2025.

Aisha Khamis Masaka (Swahili: [ɑˈiʃɑ xɑˈmisi mɑˈsɑkɑ]; born 10 November 2003) is a Tanzanian footballer who plays as a forward or a winger for Women's Super League club Brighton & Hove Albion and the Tanzania national team.

== Club career ==
Masaka has played for Young Africans in Tanzania.

After a two-year spell at BK Häcken, Masaka signed for Brighton & Hove Albion on 17 July 2024.

== International career ==
Masaka capped for Tanzania at senior level during 2021 COSAFA Championship.

== Career statistics ==
=== Club ===
As of 5 May 2025.

Appearances and goals by club, season and competition
| Club | Season | League | | | National Cup (Note: Includes Svenska Cupen Damer and Women's FA Cup) | | League Cup | | Continental | | Total | |
| Club | Season | Division | Apps | Goals | Apps | Goals | Apps | Goals | Apps | Goals | Apps | Goals |
|---|---|---|---|---|---|---|---|---|---|---|---|---|
| BK Häcken | 2023 | Damallsvenskan | 12 | 5 | 5 | 0 | — | | 0 | 0 | 17 | 5 |
| BK Häcken | 2024 | Damallsvenskan | 2 | 0 | 1 | 0 | — | | 6 | 0 | 9 | 0 |
| BK Häcken | Total | | 14 | 5 | 6 | 0 | — | | 6 | 0 | 26 | 5 |
| Brighton & Hove Albion | 2024–25 | WSL | 1 | 0 | 0 | 0 | 1 | 0 | — | | 2 | 0 |
| Brighton & Hove Albion | 2025–26 | WSL | 0 | 0 | 0 | 0 | 0 | 0 | — | | 0 | 0 |
| Brighton & Hove Albion | 2026–27 | WSL | 0 | 0 | 0 | 0 | 0 | 0 | — | | 0 | 0 |
| Brighton & Hove Albion | Total | | 1 | 0 | 0 | 0 | 1 | 0 | — | | 2 | 0 |
| Career total | | | 15 | 5 | 6 | 0 | 1 | 0 | 6 | 0 | 28 | 5 |

== Honours ==
Tanzania

- COSAFA Women's Championship winner: 2021
