= Michelle Agyemang =

English footballer (born 2006)

Michelle Agyemang MBE
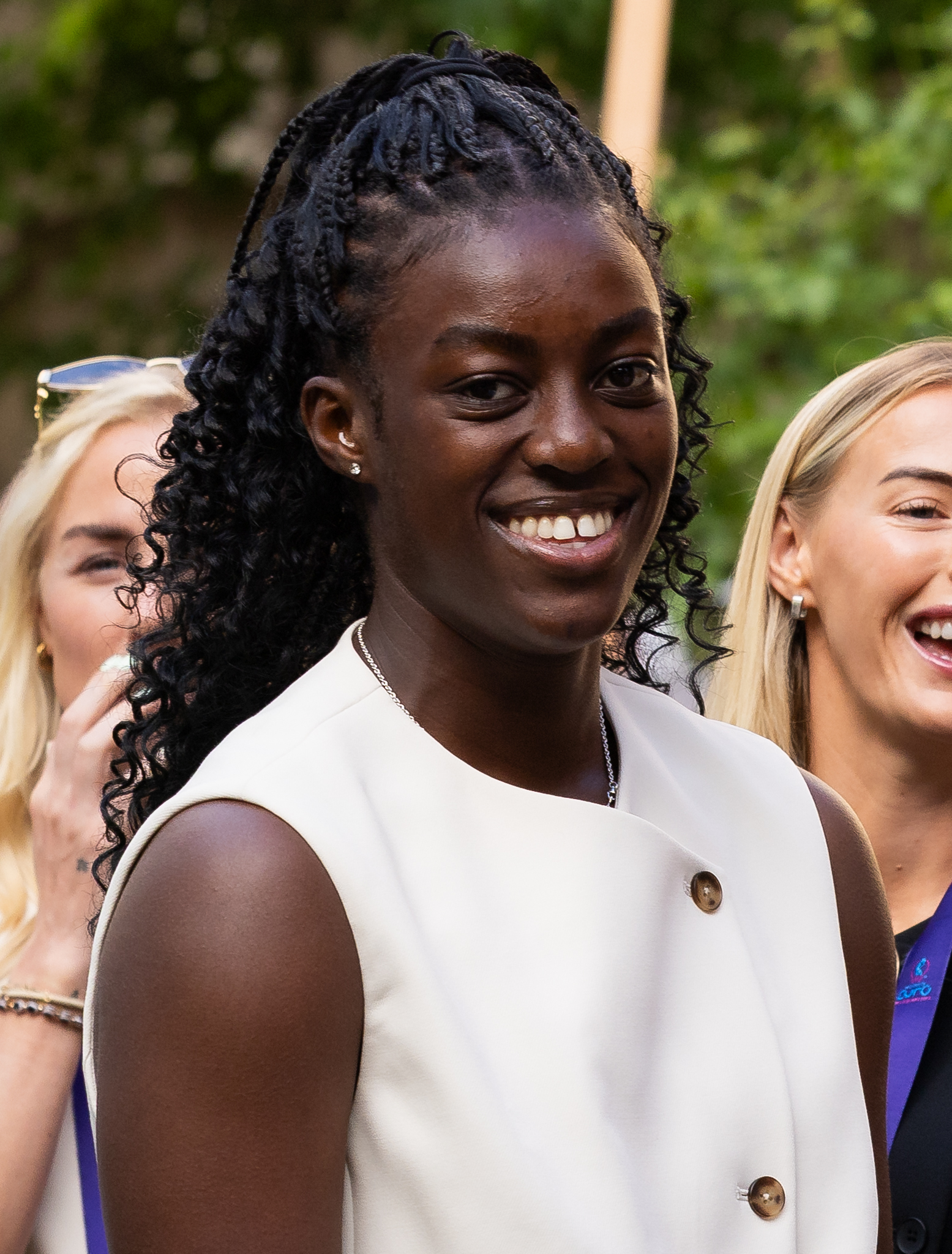
- Agyemang in 2025

Personal information
- Date of birth: 3 February 2006 (age 20)
- Place of birth: South Ockendon, Essex, England
- Height: 1.69 m (5 ft 7 in)
- Position: Forward

Team information
- Current team: Arsenal
- Number: 17

Youth career
- 2013–2023: Arsenal

Senior career*
Years	Team	Apps	(Gls)
2022–	Arsenal	4	(0)
2023–2024	→ Watford (dual reg)	9	(4)
2024–2025	→ Brighton & Hove Albion (loan)	22	(4)

International career^{‡}
2022	England U16	2	(2)
2022–2023	England U17	12	(10)
2023–2025	England U19	9	(8)
2024–	England U23	2	(3)
2025–	England	7	(3)
Medal record
Women's football
Representing England
UEFA Women's Championship
Winner	2025 Switzerland
- * Club domestic league appearances and goals as of 5 October 2025 ‡ National team caps and goals as of 28 October 2025

Michelle Agyemang MBE (Akan: [ad͡ʒɛmaŋ]; born 3 February 2006) is an English professional footballer who plays as a forward for Women's Super League club Arsenal and the England national team. Agyemang was part of the England squad which won the UEFA Euro 2025, where she was named the young player of the tournament. She was named BBC Young Sports Personality of the Year for 2025.

== Early life ==
Agyemang was born in South Ockendon, Essex. She attended Holy Cross School Primary School in South Ockendon, Southend High School for Girls and is currently studying at King's College London. She is of Ghanaian descent.

Her father is a Manchester United fan, her brother is a Chelsea fan, her sister is an Arsenal fan and she is also an Arsenal fan. Growing up, her favourite players were Olivier Giroud and Theo Walcott.

== Youth career ==
Agyemang is a life-long Gunner. She joined Arsenal at the age of six. She appeared in 11 games for the Arsenal Academy team during the 2022–2023 season and was their top goalscorer across all competitions. She finished the season as second in number of goals scored and top in number of goals per game in all competitions at U21 academy level. In 2021, Michelle was a ball girl for England's World Cup qualifier against Northern Ireland at Wembley Stadium.

On 7 August 2025, it was announced that Agyemang was one of the nominees of the inaugural 2025 Women's Kopa Trophy, one of the additional Ballon d'Or awards.

== Club career ==
=== Arsenal ===
In November 2022, Agyemang made her senior club debut at the age of 16 against Leicester City in Arsenal's 4–0 victory in the Women's Super League. On 29 January 2023, Agyemang's scored her first goal for the club in the fourth round of the Women's FA Cup against Leeds United in the 80th minute. The goal was nominated for Arsenal's Goal of the Month for January 2023 and came second to men’s player Bukayo Saka.

On 1 May 2023, Agyemang made her first appearance in a European competition coming on as a substitute during extra time of their Champions League semi-final defeat to VfL Wolfsburg.

On 23 June 2023, it was announced by the club that Agyemang had committed to signing a professional contract with the club when she turns eighteen.

=== Watford (dual registration) ===
In August 2023, Agyemang joined Watford F.C. in the Women's Championship on a dual-sign agreement, making her debut for Watford on 3 September against London City Lionesses. She would then miss the first half of the 2023–24 season through injury.

On 4 February 2024, Agyemang scored her first goals for the club, scoring twice against Birmingham City, helping the team off the bottom of the Championship with a 2–0 win.

=== Brighton & Hove Albion ===
On 13 September 2024, Agyemang signed for Brighton & Hove Albion on loan from Arsenal for the 2024–25 season. She scored 5 goals over all competitions in 22 appearances for the club during the season. Agyemang returned to Brighton for the 2025–26 season on 19 August 2025 renewing her Arsenal loan. On 28 September, from close range Agyemang scored her first Women's Super League goal of the season as Brighton secured a narrow 1-0 win over Everton. She returned to Arsenal early in January 2026 to complete her ACL recovery.

== International career ==
=== Youth ===
In May 2023, Agyemang was named in the England under-17 squad for the 2023 U-17 Championship. In the tournament she scored twice against Poland for a 2–1 win, giving the team their first goal of the competition within three minutes. She followed up by scoring another two goals against Sweden in a 3–1 victory, as well as started in the semi-final defeat against Spain. In November 2023, she was named as part of the under-19 squad for the Algarve Cup, scoring two goals against the Netherlands on 4 December in a 3–3 draw.

On 14 July in the 2024 Under-19 Championship, Agyemang scored a hat-trick in England's opening group stage match in a 10–0 victory over Lithuania. In October 2024, Agyemang was called up to the England under-23 squad for European League fixtures.

Agyemang scored her first goal for the England under-23s during a 3–2 loss against Germany on 20 February 2025.

=== Senior ===
On 6 April 2025, Agyemang was called up to the England senior squad for the first time, replacing the injured Alessia Russo. Two days later, on 8 April, she made her senior debut as an 80th-minute substitute during England's UEFA Nations League match against Belgium. Just 41 seconds after her introduction, Agyemang scored her first senior international goal in a 3–2 defeat for England. Following her debut, Agyemang was awarded legacy number 234 by the Women's Football Association.

In June 2025, Agyemang was named in England's squad for UEFA Euro 2025. On 17 July 2025, she scored the equalising goal for England to make it 2–2 in the 81st minute in their quarter-final match against Sweden, which England ultimately won through a penalty shootout. On 22 July 2025, she scored another equaliser, in the 96th minute, against Italy in the semi-finals to send the game into extra time, which England went on to win 2–1 to progress to the final. On 27 July 2025, Agyemang came on as a substitute in the tournament's final, helping England to a victory on penalties over Spain to win their second European title. She was named the young player of the tournament.

Following the Euros, Agyemang was called up to the squad for their friendlies against Brazil and Australia in October 2025. On 28 October 2025, in the match against Australia, Agyemang went down with an off-the-ball injury just before the 80th minute and was stretchered off the pitch. It was later confirmed that she had torn her ACL and would miss the rest of the season.

== Career statistics ==
As of 19 October 2025

Appearances and goals by club, season and competition
Club	Season	League			FA Cup		League Cup		Europe (Note: Includes the UEFA Women's Champions League)		Total	
Club	Season	Division	Apps	Goals	Apps	Goals	Apps	Goals	Apps	Goals	Apps	Goals
Arsenal Academy	2021–22	FA WSL Academy League	2	3	—		—		—		2	3
Arsenal Academy	2022–23	FA WSL Academy League	9	15	—		—		—		9	15
Arsenal Academy	Total		11	18	—		—		—		11	18
Arsenal	2022–23	WSL	3	0	1	1	0	0	1	0	5	1
Arsenal	2023–24	WSL	1	0	0	0	0	0	0	0	1	0
Arsenal	Total		4	0	1	1	0	0	1	0	6	1
Watford (loan)	2023–24	Women's Championship	9	4	1	1	0	0	—		10	5
Brighton & Hove Albion (loan)	2024–25	WSL	17	3	2	1	3	1	—		22	5
Brighton & Hove Albion (loan)	2025–26	WSL	5	1	0	0	3	0	—		8	1
Brighton & Hove Albion (loan)	Total		22	4	2	1	6	1	—		30	6
Career total			46	26	4	3	6	1	1	0	57	30

=== International ===
As of match played 28 October 2025

Appearances and goals by national team and year
National team	Year	Apps	Goals
England	2025	7	3
Total		7	3

Scores and results list England's goal tally first, score column indicates score after each Agyemang goal.

List of international goals scored by Michelle Agyemang
No.	Date	Venue	Opponent	Score	Result	Competition	Ref.
1	8 April 2025	Den Dreef, Leuven, Belgium	Belgium	2–3	2–3	2025 UEFA Nations League A	
2	17 July 2025	Letzigrund, Zurich, Switzerland	Sweden	2–2	2–2 (a.e.t.) (3–2 p)	UEFA Euro 2025	
3	22 July 2025	Stade de Genève, Geneva, Switzerland	Italy	1–1	2–1 (a.e.t.)	UEFA Euro 2025	

== Honours ==
England

- UEFA Women's Championship: 2025

Individual

- Golden Girl: 2025
- UEFA Women's Championship Young Player of the Tournament: 2025
- BBC Young Sports Personality of the Year: 2025
- Sunday Times Young Sportswoman of the Year: 2025
- Brighton & Hove Albion Young Player of the Season: 2024-25

== Personal life ==
Agyemang is a devout Christian. She has appeared on Songs of Praise and has spoken publicly about her faith on a number of platforms.
