= Comfort Erhabor =

Nigerian footballer

Personal information
- Full name: Comfort Chibuzo Erhabor
- Date of birth: 26 April 2005 (age 21)
- Height: 1.80 m (5 ft 11 in)
- Position: Goalkeeper

Team information
- Current team: Crystal Palace
- Number: 56

Youth career
- West Ham Women's Academy

Senior career*
Years	Team	Apps	(Gls)
2023−2024	Brighton & Hove Albion		
2024	→ Hibernian (loan)	2	(0)
2024–2025	→ Plymouth Argyle (loan)	6	(0)
2025–2026	Portsmouth	2	(0)
2026–	Crystal Palace	0	(0)

International career^{‡}
2022	Nigeria U17		
2026–	Nigeria	2	(0)
- * Club domestic league appearances and goals as of 8 June 2026 ‡ National team caps and goals as of 9 June 2026

Comfort Chibuzo Erhabor (born 26 April 2005) is a professional footballer who plays as a goalkeeper for Women's Super League club Crystal Palace F.C. Women. Born in the Netherlands, she plays for the Nigeria women's national team.

== Early life and career ==
Erhabor was born in the Netherlands to Nigerian parents from Edo State and was raised in England. She progressed through the West Ham academy before signing her first professional contract with Brighton & Hove Albion in January 2024. She was subsequently loaned out to Hibernian and Plymouth Argyle for the next two seasons. In July 2025, Erhabor signed for Portsmouth on a one-year deal with the possibility of an extension.

On 3 September 2026, Erhabor officially signed for Crystal Palace Women on a two‑year contract.

== International career ==
Although born in the Netherlands, Erhabor firmly declared her intention to represent Nigeria, the country of her parents. She was invited to training camps with the Nigerian U17 women's team. On February 28, 2026, she made her senior debut in a 1-0 friendly defeat to Cameroon in Yaoundé. She was included in Nigeria's squad for the 2026 Women's Africa Cup of Nations but saw no action.
