= Reanna Blades =

Jamaican footballer (born 2005)

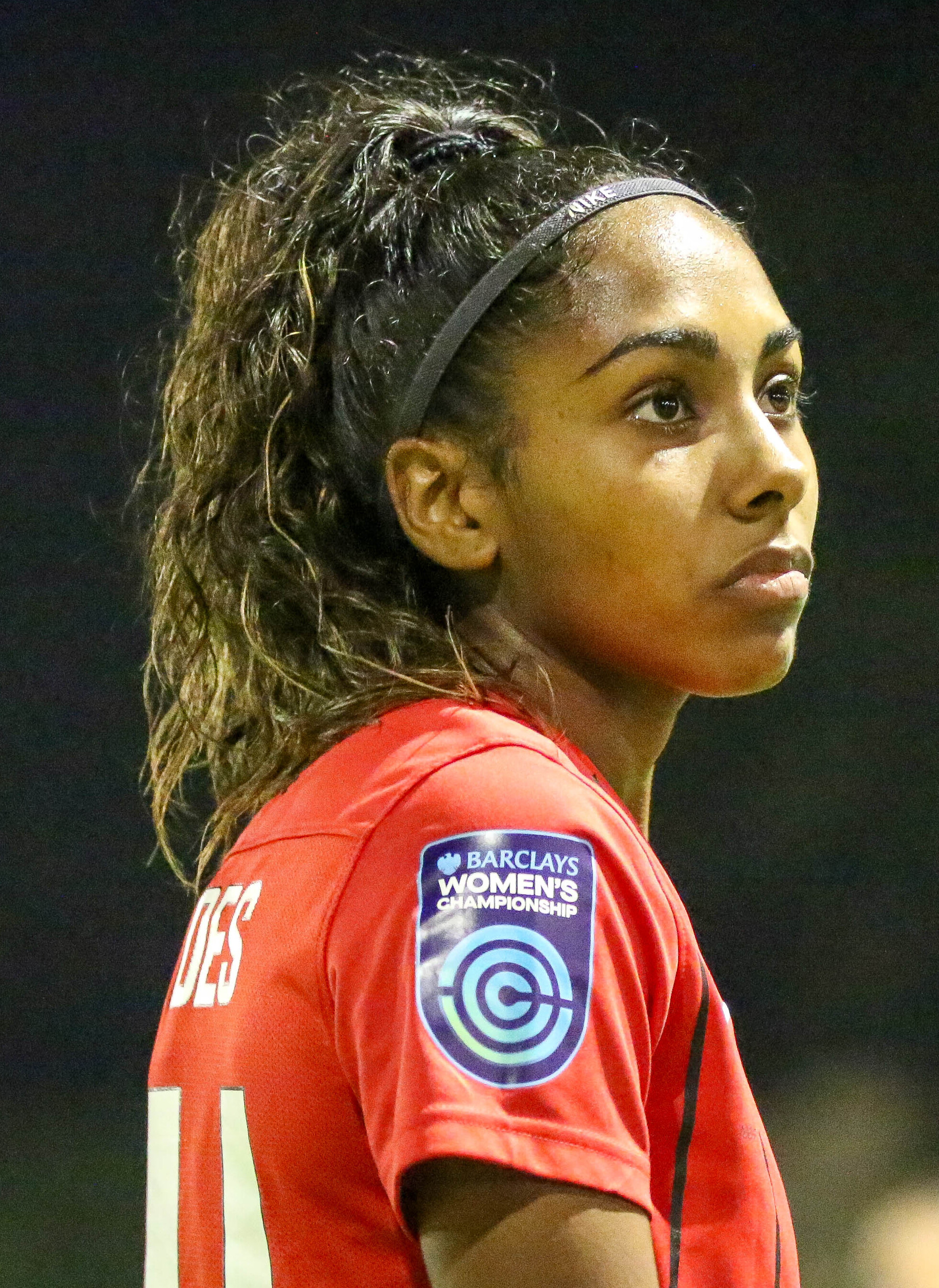
- Blades playing for Lewes in 2023

Personal information
- Full name: Reanna Lauren Blades
- Date of birth: 2 October 2005 (age 21)
- Place of birth: Croydon, Surrey, England
- Height: 1.57 m (5 ft 2 in)
- Positions: Midfielder; winger

Team information
- Current team: Portsmouth
- Number: 23

Youth career
- Brighton & Hove Albion
- Chelsea

Senior career*
Years	Team	Apps	(Gls)
2021–2024	Chelsea	0	(0)
2023–2024	→ Lewes (loan)	20	(2)
2024–2025	Burnley	7	(2)
2025–2026	Sunderland	0	(0)
2026–	Portsmouth	0	(0)

International career^{‡}
2021	England U19	1	(0)
2025–	Jamaica	1	(0)
- * Club domestic league appearances and goals as of 20 October 2024 ‡ National team caps and goals as of 25 February 2025

Reanna Lauren Blades (born 2 October 2005) is a professional footballer who plays as a midfielder for Portsmouth in the National League South. After moving from Women's Super League 2 side Sunderland. She previously played for Chelsea, Lewes, Burnley, and the England under-19s. Born in England, she now represents Jamaica at senior international level.

== Club career ==
=== Chelsea ===
Prior to joining Chelsea's academy at under-14 level, she spent a season with Brighton's Regional Talent Club. At under-21 academy level, Blades featured in 23 matches, scoring 15 goals. Blades spent part of her early development with AF Global Football's academy programme before moving into the professional club system.

On 1 August 2021, in a friendly match before the 2021–22 season, Blades scored her debut senior goal for Chelsea, an equalising goal in a 2–1 defeat to Arsenal. On 13 October 2022, Blades signed for first professional contract with Women's Super League club Chelsea at the age of 18.

On 19 March 2023, she made her competitive debut for Chelsea in the FA Cup quarter-final match against Reading, as a second-half substitute. On 23 April 2023 Blades scored the third goal in a 3–1 victory over Manchester United in the WSL Academy League Cup Final.

On 19 July 2023, she joined Women's Championship club Lewes on loan for the 2023–24 season.

=== Burnley ===
On 30 June 2024, Blades left Chelsea after the end of her contract and joined National League North side Burnley on 1 August. On 15 September 2024, she scored her debut goal for the club against Nottingham Forest in a 1–1 draw, helping to secure a point for the side. On 1 December, in the second round of the 2024–25 FA Cup, Blades scored a first half goal in the 11–0 win over Bradford City.

=== Sunderland ===
On 2 July 2025, Sunderland announced that Blades had signed an initial one-year deal, moving up to the Women's Super League 2.

=== Portsmouth ===
On 26 September 2026, Portsmouth had announced that Blades had signed for the club.

== International career ==
Blades has represented England at under-16, under-17, and under-19 youth levels.

Blades received her first senior international call up to the Jamaica national football team for friendly fixtures against France, where she was an unused substitute in the first match on 26 October 2024.

== Personal life ==
In 2020, Blades backed The Telegraph's "Keep Kids Active in Lockdown" campaign. At age 16 she coached children for United Synergy FC in Croydon. In July 2023, alongside Lioness Fara Williams, Blades joined lingerie company Bluebella's campaign in support of women's sports.

== Honours ==
Chelsea

- FA Cup: 2022–23
