= Marit Auée =

Dutch footballer (born 2002)

Personal information
- Date of birth: 11 January 2002 (age 24)
- Place of birth: Zutphen, Netherlands
- Height: 5 ft 10 in (1.78 m)
- Position: Defender

Team information
- Current team: Brighton & Hove Albion
- Number: 23

Youth career
- CSV Apeldoorn

College career
Years	Team	Apps	(Gls)
2020	Dallas Baptist University	14	(7)

Senior career*
Years	Team	Apps	(Gls)
2018–2020	PEC Zwolle	9	(0)
2021–2022	PEC Zwolle	21	(2)
2022–2024	FC Twente	35	(7)
2024–	Brighton & Hove Albion	19	(0)

International career^{‡}
2018	Netherlands U16	6	(0)
2018–2019	Netherlands U17	13	(0)
2020	Netherlands U18	3	(1)
2019–2020	Netherlands U19	7	(0)
2022	Netherlands U20	8	(2)
2021–	Netherlands U23	20	(0)
- * Club domestic league appearances and goals as of 22 November 2026 ‡ National team caps and goals as of 27 October 2025

Marit Auée (Dutch: [ˈmaːrɪt ʌuˈeː]; born 11 January 2002) is a Dutch football player who plays as a defender for Women's Super League club Brighton & Hove Albion.

== Club career ==
In 2018, Auée switched from her youth club CSV Apeldoorn to Eredivisie side PEC Zwolle. On 15 February 2019, she made her debut in the main squad against Ajax. She came on for Allison Murphy in the 72nd minute. The match was lost 0–4. In February 2020, Auée announced that she would continue her career in the United States, pursuing her studies at Dallas Baptist University. In the summer of 2021 she returned to PEC Zwolle, and signed a two-year contract until 2023. After a season she left for Enschede to play football for FC Twente. She signed a two-season contract.

On 9 July 2024, Auée joined Women's Super League club Brighton & Hove Albion.

== International career ==
On 17 February 2018, Auée made her debut for the Netherlands U16s in a friendly match against Germany.

On 17 October 2018, Auée made her debut for the Netherlands U17s in a qualifying match against Georgia.

On 25 January 2020, Auée made her debut for the Netherlands U18s in a friendly match against Norway.

On 1 September 2019, Auée made her debut for the Netherlands U19s in a friendly match against Germany.

On 22 June 2022, Auée made her debut for the Netherlands U20 in a friendly match against Mexico.

On 19 September 2021, Auée made her debut for the Netherlands U23 in a friendly match against Sweden.

== Career statistics ==
=== Club ===
As of match played 22 November 2026

Appearances and goals by club, season and competition
Club	Season	League			National Cup (Note: Includes KNVB Women's Cup)		League Cup (Note: Includes Eredivisie Cup and FA Women's League Cup)		Continental (Note: Includes UEFA Women's Champions League)		Other (Note: Includes KNVB Women's Super Cup)		Total	
Club	Season	Division	Apps	Goals	Apps	Goals	Apps	Goals	Apps	Goals	Apps	Goals	Apps	Goals
PEC Zwolle	2018–19	Eredivisie	1	0	0	0	0	0	0	0	—		1	0
PEC Zwolle	2019–20	Eredivisie	8	0	0	0	0	0	0	0	—		8	0
PEC Zwolle	2021–22	Eredivisie	21	2	1	0	0	0	0	0	—		22	2
PEC Zwolle	Total		30	2	1	0	0	0	0	0	—		31	2
FC Twente	2022–23	Eredivisie	17	5	4	1	3	0	0	0	1	0	25	6
FC Twente	2023–24	Eredivisie	18	2	1	0	2	0	4	1	1	0	26	3
FC Twente	Total		35	7	5	1	5	0	4	1	2	0	51	9
Brighton & Hove Albion	2024–25	Women's Super League	7	0	0	0	1	0	—		—		8	0
Brighton & Hove Albion	2025–26	Women's Super League	7	0	0	0	3	0	—		—		10	0
Brighton & Hove Albion	2026–27	Women's Super League	5	0	0	0	5	0	—		—		10	0
Brighton & Hove Albion	Total		19	0	0	0	9	0	—		—		28	0
Career total			84	9	6	1	14	0	4	1	2	0	110	11

== Honours ==
Twente

- Eredivisie winner: 2023–24
- KNVB Women's Cup winner: 2022–23
- KNVB Women's Super Cup Winner: 2022–23, 2023–24
- Eredivise Cup winner: 2022–23, 2023–24
