= Marisa Olislagers =

Dutch footballer (born 2000)

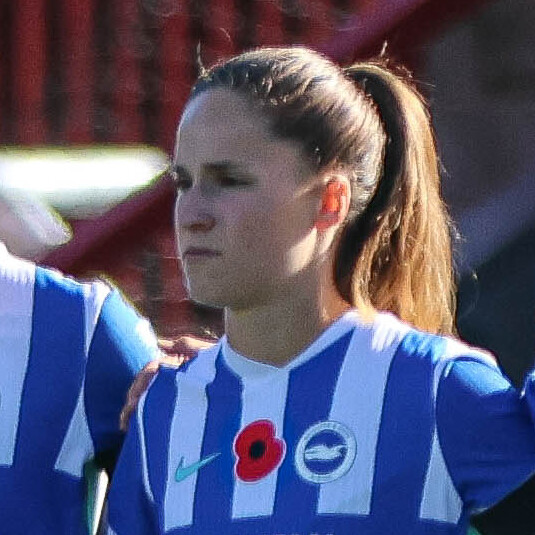
- Olislagers with Brighton & Hove Albion in 2025

Personal information
- Full name: Marisa Christiane Almadelia Olislagers
- Date of birth: 9 September 2000 (age 26)
- Place of birth: Santpoort-Zuid, Netherlands
- Height: 5 ft 5 in (1.65 m)
- Positions: Left-back; midfielder

Team information
- Current team: Brighton & Hove Albion
- Number: 19

Youth career
- BVC Bloemendaal
- RKVV DSS
- Telstar
- CTO Amsterdam

Senior career*
Years	Team	Apps	(Gls)
2018–2020	ADO Den Haag	34	(4)
2020–2024	Twente	84	(14)
2024–	Brighton & Hove Albion	52	(4)

International career^{‡}
2015	Netherlands U15	4	(0)
2015–2016	Netherlands U16	12	(1)
2015–2017	Netherlands U17	18	(1)
2017–2019	Netherlands U19	28	(1)
2019–2024	Netherlands U23	17	(2)
2021–	Netherlands	20	(0)
- * Club domestic league appearances and goals as of 22 November 2026 ‡ National team caps and goals as of 9 October 2026

Marisa Christiane Almadelia Olislagers (Dutch: [maːˈrisaː krɪstiˈjaːnə ʋɪlɦɛlˈminaː ˈoːlɪslaːɣərs]; born 9 September 2000) is a Dutch professional footballer who plays as a left-back or midfielder for Women's Super League club Brighton & Hove Albion and the Netherlands national team.

== Club career ==
Olislagers started her career with her hometown club BVC Bloemendaal at the age of eight. She then played for RKVV DSS, Telstar and CTO Amsterdam in her youth career.

In April 2018, Olislagers joined Eredivisie club ADO Den Haag. She made her debut on 7 September 2018 in a 2–0 league defeat against Excelsior. Olislagers scored her first league goals, a hattrick, against Achilles '29 on 12 October 2018. On 13 June 2019, she extended her contract with the club for one more season.

In April 2020, Olislagers moved to Twente. She made her league debut against Ajax on 6 September 2020. She scored her first league goal against ADO Den Haag on 23 April 2021, scoring in the 80th minute. On 3 May 2022, she extended her contract along with Daphne van Domselaar and Fenna Kalma.

On 1 July 2024, Olislagers joined Women's Super League club Brighton & Hove Albion. On 29 July 2026, Olislagers signed a new contract with Brighton.

== International career ==
Olislagers has represented Netherlands at various youth levels. In November 2021, she received her first call-up to the senior team. She made her debut on 29 November in a goalless friendly draw against Japan.

Olislagers was called up to the final Netherlands squad for Euro 2022.

== Career statistics ==
=== Club ===
As of match played 22 November 2026

Club	Season	League			National cup (Note: Includes KNVB Women's Cup, Women's FA Cup)		League cup (Note: Includes Eredivisie Cup, FA Women's League Cup)		Continental		Other		Total	
Club	Season	Division	Apps	Goals	Apps	Goals	Apps	Goals	Apps	Goals	Apps	Goals	Apps	Goals
ADO Den Haag	2018–19	Eredivisie	23	3	0	0	0	0	—		—		23	3
ADO Den Haag	2019–20	Eredivisie	11	1	0	0	0	0	—		—		11	1
ADO Den Haag	Total		34	4	0	0	0	0	—		—		34	4
Twente	2020–21	Eredivisie	18	1	2	1	5	2	0	0	0	0	25	4
Twente	2021–22	Eredivisie	24	4	2	0	2	0	4 (Note: Appearances in UEFA Women's Champions League)	0	0	0	32	4
Twente	2022–23	Eredivisie	20	4	4	0	3	0	2	0	1 (Note: Appearance in Dutch Women's Super Cup)	2	30	6
Twente	2023–24	Eredivisie	22	5	2	0	2	0	4	0	1	0	31	5
Twente	Total		84	14	10	1	12	2	10	0	2	2	118	19
Brighton & Hove Albion	2024–25	WSL	20	2	2	0	4	0	—		—		26	2
Brighton & Hove Albion	2025–26	WSL	21	2	5	0	2	1	—		—		28	3
Brighton & Hove Albion	2026–27	WSL	11	0	0	0	4	0	—		—		15	0
Brighton & Hove Albion	Total		52	4	7	0	10	1	—		—		69	5
Career total			170	22	17	1	22	3	10	0	2	2	221	28

=== International ===
As of match played 9 October 2026

Appearances and goals by national team and year
National team	Year	Apps	Goals
Netherlands	2021	1	0
Netherlands	2022	9	0
Netherlands	2023	0	0
Netherlands	2024	2	0
Netherlands	2025	3	0
Netherlands	2026	5	0
Total		20	0

== Honours ==
Twente

- Vrouwen Eredivisie: 2020–21, 2021–22, 2023–24
- KNVB Women's Cup: 2022–23
- Eredivisie Cup: 2021–22, 2022–23, 2023–24
- Dutch Women's Super Cup: 2022, 2023

Individual

- UEFA Women's Under-19 Championship team of the tournament: 2018
- Brighton & Hove Albion player of the season: 2024–25
