= Portsmouth F.C. Women =

English women's football club

Coordinates: 50°52′01.48″N 0°58′26.90″W

- Full name: Portsmouth Football Club Women
- Nickname: Pompey
- Founded: 1987 (Modern Era)
- Ground: Fratton Park
- Capacity: 20,899
- Owner: The Tornante Company
- Manager: Jay Sadler
- Website: portsmouthfc.co.uk/women
Home colours

Portsmouth Women, formerly known as Portsmouth Ladies, is a professional women's football club based in the south coast city of Portsmouth in Hampshire, England. The club currently plays in the FA Women's National League South. Their male counterparts are Portsmouth F.C.

== History ==
=== Early history ===
The history of Portsmouth Ladies commences in 1914, although the club was not officially formed until 1916. They were one of many women's football teams active during the First World War.

On 19 March 1914 two charity games were held for the Royal Navy Disaster fund. One of these was a women's game between Lady Artistes at the King's Theatre and a "Local Ladies" team organised by Mr. Le Lellett of the Royal Yacht Alexandria.

The game was popular, attracting a crowd of over 5000. The Local Ladies team won 5–1 with Miss Anscombe scoring four goals. She would emerge as one of the star performers for Portsmouth Ladies FC.

Several other games were subsequently played and their popular reception lead to the official formation of the team. On 14 December 1916, the Portsmouth Evening news announced the formation of Portsmouth Ladies FC. The new team were the first Women's football team in Hampshire.

Opponents were hard to come by for the newly formed team, but they did beat Basingstoke Ladies 11–0 in front of a crowd of over 3000 at Fratton Park.

Female opponents were sometimes so hard to come by that the team were forced to play against male teams. They played at least 14 games against male opponents between May and December 1917. These games took place under rules designed to emphasize women as "weaker". For example, male outfield players had their hands tied behind their backs and male goalkeepers had to keep one arm in their jersey. The Portsmouth Ladies team won 13 and drew 1 of these 14 games.

On 12 October 1918 Portsmouth Ladies took park in a Cup Competition called the Southern Championship. The deciding game played at a neutral venue in Guildford. Portsmouth Ladies won 3–2.

=== Ban on women's football ===
Very few records of Portsmouth Ladies games taking place exist during the period the FA banned Women's teams playing on affiliated pitches. This ban was in place between 1921 and 1971.

In 1968, John Phelps, then the head of PR at the men's club had recruited a team of hostesses. Clad in the Portsmouth blue team colours so that they stood out, the hostesses walked around the ground selling programmes and looking after fans on match days.

Given the growing interest in Women's football, the hostesses decided they wanted to start a team. They were encouraged and supported by Mick Williams, at the time a volunteer for the Pompey Action Group, which was a supporter group that helped the club in numerous ways.

The men's club were active in helping organise fixtures in the late 1960s, with games being advertised in the programme. With the success of the local rivals Southampton's ladies team, the focus in the late 1980s turned to forming a high quality team in Portsmouth.

=== Reformation of the modern-day Portsmouth Ladies ===
The Portsmouth Women's team as we know it today was formed in 1987. Dave Coyle was a pivotal figure in this club's early history.

Portsmouth Ladies retained a strong connection with the men's club and started playing in the 1988/89 season in the Southern Regional League. The women's game lacked the organisation and structure it does today with varied venues and opponents, although surviving match records from these years are extremely limited.

The club achieved its first promotion in 1998 when they moved up to the South West Combination League, which is broadly equivalent to Tier 3 of the modern day.

Dave Coyle was manager during this time, and in 1999 he guided the team to beat Reading, thus winning the South West Combination League Cup.

In 2002 Vanessa Raynbird was appointed director of football. Coyle thus moved upstairs and Raynbird took over team affairs.

=== Recent history 2002–2022 ===
In the 2002/3 season the team were Champions of the South West Combination and moved up to the Premier League Southern Division, which was tier 2 of the women's game.

2011 saw the formation of the Women's Super League as tier 1 of the Women's game. This made the Premier League Southern Division that Portsmouth played in drop down to be the 3rd tier of the women's game.

In the 2011/12 season Portsmouth Ladies gained promotion to the Premier League National division and tier 2.

For the 2013/14 season a new league was introduced at tier 2 called the Women's Super League 2, or WSL2. Portsmouth's bid for a place in the new WSL2 failed, and they were subsequently placed into the Southern Division tier 3.

Portsmouth Ladies FA Cup record between 1970 and 2000 is unknown. Their best known FA Cup run to date came in the 2013–14 season, when they progressed all the way to the quarter final.

In the 2014/15 season Portsmouth Ladies won the Southern Division under the management of Perry Northeast.

With the failing health of Dave Coyle, in the summer of 2015 Pompey President Mick Williams returned to his roots and took over running the club, supported by his wife and fellow director Ann.

In 2019 the women's team took another step forward to fully integrate with the men's team by adopting its branding, social media graphics and sharing marketing and ticketing collateral. Portsmouth Ladies were also rebranded to a more modern name of Portsmouth Women.

Portsmouth Women have a rich history in the Hampshire Cup. To date they have won it 17 times.

On 5 June 2023, Portsmouth FC announced that their Women's team would be turning semi-professional.

The announcement would see the Women's team moving under the same owners as the men's team, The Tornante Group.

On 24 June 2023 Portsmouth FC announced their women's Development side would transition to an Under 23 team.

On 19 January 2024 Portsmouth announced that forward Beth Lumsden was leaving to join Fully Professional Newcastle United Women.

On 14 April 2024 Portsmouth Women secured promotion to the Women's Championship by winning the Southern Premier Division title. Though Portsmouth Women had no game that day, 2nd place Hashtag United lost 2–0 to Ipswich Town.

On 31 May 2024 Portsmouth Football Club announced their women's team would be turning fully professional.

On 16 July 2025, Portsmouth announced that the club was launching a Professional Game Academy in advance of the 2025-26 Women's Super League 2 season, creating a professionalised player development pathway for players aged 16–21.

== Notable seasons in detail ==
=== 2011–12: Promotion to the Premier League National Division ===
In 2012, Portsmouth Women secured the Women's Premier League Southern Division title and promotion to the National Division for the first time in their history with the penultimate match of the season, a 2–1 win over Plymouth.

=== 2012–13: Premier League National Division ===
Portsmouth Women faced a tough Premiership National division debut with an away tie against the previous season's double winners Sunderland who also eventually ended up winning the 2012/2013 Premier League National Division title. Pompey's first win in the National Division came in a home tie against Aston Villa at Moneyfields, following a 3–0 win in their second game of the season. This was followed by a 3–2 win against Manchester City, with the winner coming in stoppage time.

In the cups, Pompey reached the Fourth Round of the FA Cup following a comprehensive 5–0 victory against QPR at Westleigh Park before falling to defeat away at Yeovil Town. In the League Cup, Pompey finished second in their group and faced Manchester City in the round of sixteen. Pompey won 2–1 at Westleigh Park in front of a large crowd. In the Quarter-Finals, Pompey defeated Barnet 2–1 but Pompey's league cup run came to an end at the Semi-Final stage once again, losing to eventual winners Aston Villa. Following Pompey's last home game against Leeds United, it was announced that manager Vanessa Raynbird would be stepping down as manager to take up a director of football role while Perry Northeast and Katie Poore would become joint managers. The 2012/13 seasons also saw Pompey taking part in the bidding process – alongside 29 other teams around the country – to join the expanded Women's Super League.

=== 2014–15: Regaining the Southern Division title ===
The Women's Premier League Southern Division began with an inauspicious start for Portsmouth FC Ladies as the side fell to a 7–3 defeat at home to Cardiff City. Lucy Quinn was sent off for handling the ball, a decision that was later overturned. However, blistering form in the league which saw the Hampshire side go undefeated for several months meant that Portsmouth Ladies were challenging for the title. By March this had turned into a four-horse race between Portsmouth, Brighton, Charlton and Cardiff City, but by the end of the season the title was between Portsmouth and Brighton. With just two games left of the season, Portsmouth needed four points to secure the title. Pompey won them both, sealing the Women's Premier League Southern Division title with a victory at home in front of a large crowd. This marked Portsmouth's second league title in four seasons. However, they lost the promotion play off against the Northern League Winners, Sheffield F.C. Ladies after a goal in the 90th minute separated the teams. It was played in neutral at The DCS Stadium, home of Southern Football League Premier Division side Stratford Town F.C.

Portsmouth also retained the Hampshire Cup with a 4–1 win against local rivals Southampton Saints. With this match being the first meeting between Portsmouth and Southampton in women's or men's football since 2011, a large crowd was present to watch Portsmouth Ladies secure their ninth Hampshire Cup.

The 2014/15 season was also significant for the Blues as Ini-Abasi Umotong became the first ever Portsmouth Ladies player to be capped at international senior level when she made her debut for Nigeria in a 2–2 draw against Mali. Umotong was later called up for the Nigeria Women's World Cup squad but was an unused substitute in all three of the Super Falcons group games.

=== 2023–24: Winning the Southern Premier Division and Promotion to the Championship ===
Pompey finished their season having won 20 of the 22 games. With a points per game of 2.77 they took the record of the highest PPG of any team in the Southern Division since records began in 2003 and the 3rd highest ever at tier 3.

In the club's 125th year, Pompey scored 125 goals in all competitions, conceding just 18 with 17 clean sheets.

Emma Jones won player of the season and players player of the season with Georgie Freeland winning young player of the season. Sophie Quirk won the Portsmouth Women Supporters Club player of the season.

Jay Sadler won the LMA Women's Championship Manager of the Year award for his achievements keeping Pompey in the division.

== Notable club personnel ==
=== Dave Coyle ===
Between his formation of the club in 1987 and his sad passing due to cancer in August 2016 he fulfilled severals role in the club. He was awarded the Outstanding Contribution to Women's Football at the FA Women's Football Awards in December 2015 and a minute's silence in his honour was observed at all Tier 3 and Tier 4 games on the Sunday after his death.

In April 2024 Dave was inducted into the Portsmouth FC Hall of Fame. He was only the second person linked to the women's team inducted, following former Captain Gemma Hilliers induction in 2018.

=== Mick & Ann Williams, Eric Coleborn ===
Mick Williams has been heavily involved with Portsmouth Ladies since late in the 1970s. He got involved again when he took over from Dave Coyle in the summer of 2015 and was supported by his wife and fellow director Ann.

At the end of the 2017–18 season, after three years in the post, Mick stepped down as chair and was replaced by Eric Coleborn.

== Managers ==
Dave Coyle was manager for many seasons in the early years of the club. Vanessa Raynbird managed for 11 seasons (from the 2002–03 season to 2012–13) before becoming director of football. She was followed by Perry Northeast, and initially Katie Poore, who served for 3 seasons. Craig Taylor was appointed as manager at the start of the 2016–17 season. He departed in the November 2016 . Immediately following Taylor's departure his assistant Jay Sadler was appointed manager.

== Notable players and international honours ==
=== Players who have represented Portsmouth and have senior international honours ===
Below is a list of players who have played for Portsmouth and also played for their countries at senior level during their career.

| Player | Country |
|---|---|
| Ini-Abasi Umotong | Nigeria |
| Alex Lusan | Romania |
| Emma Jones | Wales |
| Samantha Quayle | Wales |
| Vicky Carleton | Northern Ireland |
| Cherelle Khassal | Republic of Ireland |
| Lucy Quinn | Republic of Ireland |
| Justine Lorton | England |
| Charlie Estcourt | Wales |
| Comfort Erhabor | Nigeria |
| Annie Wilding | Wales |

== Academy and youth system ==
The first Pompey Women youth teams were established in the early 1990s and these continued to operate at a variety of age groups.

In 2000, Portsmouth F.C. Women officially introduced a Youth Structure within the club, catering for U14 and U12 teams.

Since being introduced, this has continued to expand and now the club has programmes allowing girls and women of all ages to participate in football. In 2005 they became only the second women's club in Britain to establish a Football Academy for females.

For the 2014/15 season, an U18 side was introduced to bridge the gap between the U16 team, which was currently the eldest youth team level, and the senior teams (including both the reserves and the first teams), allowing a clear pathway for players coming up Portsmouth FC Ladies' youth ranks. This new U18 team competed in the newly formed Hampshire U18 League along with other local sides.

At the end of the 2016–17 season the entire youth organisation was transferred to Pompey in the Community where it currently runs under the stewardship of former Portsmouth Women player Kirsty Pearce (McGee).

In July 2023 PITC announced they had been granted a 2-year Emerging Talent Centre (ETC) licence by the FA. Their ETC training squad will sit under their Youth Development Teams to further strengthen the girls player pathway.

In early 2024 the youth teams and ETC squad started training at the John Jenkins stadium complex after the two artificial pitches were completed.

Since the PITC take over of the youth system they have produced three notable first team players in Mia Adaway, Freya Jones and Jess Smith

== Home grounds ==
In contrast to the men's team which has called Fratton Park home in the last 125 years, Pompey Women have played home fixtures at many grounds.

Between 2015 and 2023 alone, they have been based at Cams Alder (Fareham Town), Privett Park (Gosport Borough), Westleigh Park across two spells (Havant & Waterlooville) and the PMC Stadium (Baffins Milton Rovers). Other grounds used have included Bognor Regis Town, Petersfield Town, Fleetlands, UoP Furze Lane, Havant Front Lawn, Hayling United, Moneyfields, Littlehampton Town and Portchester.

The average home attendance broke the 100 barrier for the first time in 2016–17 season and has been increasing every season since.

In the 2018/19 season, the team secured a deal with local side Baffins Milton Rovers to ground share their PMC stadium for home games.

From the start of the 2020/21 season Portsmouth agreed a deal with local side Havant and Waterlooville to use their new artificial pitch to train and play their home games on. They still play there to the current day.

Ahead of the 2026/27 season Portsmouth FC announced that Portsmouth Women will play all their home league games at Fratton Park following significant upgrade works to the pitch.

=== Fratton Park matches ===
The modern era Women's team of Portsmouth FC have played several times at Fratton Park:

| Date | Opposition | Result | Attendance |
|---|---|---|---|
| 01-Dec-13 | Spurs | L 1–2 | 673 |
| 07-May-17 | QPR | W 3–2 | 367 |
| 13-May-18 | QPR | W 6–1 | 397 |
| 15-Dec-21 | Southampton FC | L 0–1 | 1,450 |
| 03-Apr-22 | MK Dons | L 0–3 | 748 |
| 25-Jul-22 | Brighton U23 | W 3–2 | 2,906 |
| 30-Apr-23 | Crawley Wasps | W 1–0 | 1,471 |
| 24-Mar-24 | Rugby Borough | W 4–0 | 2,405 |
| 13-Oct-24 | Southampton FC | L 0–5 | 2,390 |
| 16-Mar-24 | Sunderland | W 2–1 | 2,461 |
| 27-Apr-25 | Blackburn | W 4–0 | 1,918 |
| 21-Sept-25 | Sheff Utd | W 1-0 | 1,129 |
| 12-Oct-25 | Southampton | L 2-5 | 2,315 |
| 22-Mar-26 | Sunderland | L 0-1 | 1,293 |
| 26-Apr-26 | Nottingham Forest | L 0-1 | 1,273 |

== Current squad ==
As of 27 September 2026

Note: Flags indicate national team as defined under FIFA eligibility rules; some limited exceptions apply. Players may hold more than one non-FIFA nationality.

| No. | Pos. | Nation | Player |
|---|---|---|---|
| 1 | GK | ENG | Hermione Cull |
| 2 | DF | SCO | Jasmine Bull (captain) |
| 3 | DF | ENG | Lucy Johnson |
| 4 | DF | WAL | Annie Wilding |
| 6 | DF | ENG | Annie Hutchings |
| 7 | FW | ENG | Georgie Freeland |
| 8 | MF | IRL | Ava Rowbotham (vice-captain) |
| 9 | FW | NIR | Kerry Beattie |
| 10 | MF | ENG | Jemima Dahou |
| 11 | FW | ENG | Angelina Nixon |
| 12 | FW | ENG | Sofia Mallon |

| No. | Pos. | Nation | Player |
|---|---|---|---|
| 14 | DF | ENG | Katie Wilson |
| 16 | DF | ENG | Summer Hughes |
| 17 | MF | ENG | Amelia Hazard |
| 18 | MF | ENG | Freya Jones |
| 19 | DF | ENG | Zoe Barratt |
| 20 | MF | ENG | Alisha Ware |
| 23 | FW | JAM | Reanna Blades |
| 25 | DF | ENG | Izzy Collins |
| 26 | DF | ENG | Arabella Suttie |
| 28 | MF | ENG | Esta Roberts |
| 30 | GK | ENG | Ella Pettit |

== Board members and staff ==
=== Current board members and presidents ===
| Name | Job title |
|---|---|
| (United States) Jane Eisner | Chair |
| (United States) Georgia Eisner | Director |
| (United States) Stacey Eisner | Director |
| (United States) Terena Eisner | Director |
| (United States) Eric Eisner | Director |
| (England) Eric Coleborn | Director |
| (England) Val Cohen | Director |
| (England) Helen Chivers | Honorary Vice-president |
| (England) Bill Griffiths | Honorary Vice-president |

=== Current staff ===
| Name | Job title |
|---|---|
| (England) Brooke Chaplen | Head of Football |
| (England) Jay Sadler | First Team Head Coach |
| (England) Kim Stenning | First Team Assistant Head Coach |
| (England) Ollie Reeves | Physical Performance Coach |
| (England) James Webb | First Team Sports Therapist |
| (England) Grace Laidlaw | Recruitment and Performance Analyst |
| (England) Kirsty Pearce | Head of the Professional Game Academy |

== Managerial history ==
As of 20 April, 2026:

| Name | Tenure | Refs |
|---|---|---|
| Vanessa Raynbird | 2002 - 2013 | |
| Katie Poore | 2013 | |
| Perry Northeast | 2013 - 2015 | |
| Craig Taylor | 2015 - 2016 | |
| Jay Sadler | November 2016 – | |

== Notable club honours ==
In the modern era of Portsmouth Women (post 1987), the known existing historic records show they have won 5 League Titles and 23 Cup Competitions.

Southern Regional Football League (Tier 4)

- Winners: (1) 1997–98

South West Combination Women's Football League (Tier 3)

- Winners: (1) 2002–03
- Runners-up: (2) 2000–01, 2001–02

FA Women's/FAWNL Premier League Southern Division (Tier 3)

- Winners: (3) 2011–12, 2014–15, 2023–24
- Runners-up: (2) 2004–05, 2006–07

South West Combination League Cup

- Winners: (1) 1998–99

Hampshire Cup

- Winners: (17) 2003–04, 2004–05, 2005–06, 2006–07, 2008–09, 2009–10, 2010–11, 2011–12, 2012–13, 2013–14, 2014–15, 2015–16, 2016–17, 2017–18, 2018–19, 2019–20, 2021–22

Portsmouth Divisional Football Association Cup

- Winners: (5) 2018–19, 2019–20, 2020–21, 2021–22, 2022–23

== Season history ==
Notes:

FA Records are missing before 2002 and some after are incomplete.

- (Note 1) In 2010/11 The Women's Premier Division Southern Division previously Tier 2 of Women's football was moved down to Tier 3 due to the formation of the Women's Super League.
- (Note 2) In 2013/14 Portsmouth Ladies were placed into the Women's Premier League Southern Division (Tier 3) due to their failed bid to have a place in the newly formed WSL2 (Tier 2)
- (Note 3) Portsmouth disqualified from the FA Cup for fielding an ineligible player in round 2 vs Cheltenham.
- (Note 4) No Hampshire Cup or League Cup played due to COVID
- (Note 5) Portsmouth were automatically promoted to the Women's Championship when they won the league due to the abandonment of the previous system in the summer of 2023 which had the winners of the Southern Division play the winners of the Northern Division for one promotion spot. Under the new system both Northern and Southern Division Champions were promoted from the 2023/24 season.
- (Note 6) Women's Championship renamed Women's Super League 2 (WSL 2)

| Season | Division | Tier | Position | Manager | Cup victories | Top scorer | Cup finishes |
|---|---|---|---|---|---|---|---|
| 2002–03 | South West Combination League | 3 | 1st of 12 (Champions). Promoted | Vanessa Raynbird | | N/K | FA Cup (3rd Round) |
| 2003–04 | Women's Premier League Southern Division | 2 | 9th of 13 | Vanessa Raynbird | Hampshire Cup | N/K | FA Cup (4th Round) |
| 2004–05 | Women's Premier League Southern Division | 2 | 2nd of 12 | Vanessa Raynbird | Hampshire Cup | Stacey Niven (8) | FA Cup (4th Round), FANW Premier League Cup (1st Round) |
| 2005–06 | Women's Premier League Southern Division | 2 | 4th of 12 | Vanessa Raynbird | Hampshire Cup | Charley Wilson (15) | FA Cup (4th Round), League Cup (2nd Round) |
| 2006–07 | Women's Premier League Southern Division | 2 | 2nd of 12 | Vanessa Raynbird | Hampshire Cup | Brooke Chaplen (11) | FA Cup (3rd Round), FAWP League Cup (Prelim Round) |
| 2007–08 | Women's Premier League Southern Division | 2 | 4th of 12 | Vanessa Raynbird | | Brooke Chaplen, Kirsty McGee (8) | FA Cup (5th Round), FAWP League Cup (3rd Round), Hamp Cup (NK) |
| 2008–09 | Women's Premier League Southern Division | 2 | 5th of 12 | Vanessa Raynbird | Hampshire Cup | Lisa Langrish (12) | FA Cup (4th Round), FAWP League Cup (4th Round) |
| 2009–10 | Women's Premier League Southern Division | 2 | 4th of 12 | Vanessa Raynbird | Hampshire Cup | Zoe Nash (11) | FA Cup (5th Round), FAWP League Cup (3rd Round) |
| 2010–11 | Women's Premier League Southern Division | 3 (Note 1) | 4th of 10 | Vanessa Raynbird | Hampshire Cup | Lindsey Roe (9) | FA Cup (3rd Round), FAWP League Cup (3rd Round) |
| 2011–12 | Women's Premier League Southern Division | 3 | 1st of 10 (Champions) Promoted | Vanessa Raynbird | Hampshire Cup | Jemma Tewkesbury (17) | FA Cup (3rd Round), FAWP League Cup (Quarter Final) |
| 2012–13 | Premier League National Division | 2 | 9th of 10 | Vanessa Raynbird | Hampshire Cup | Charley Wilson (20) | FA Cup (4th Round), FAWP League Cup (Semi Final) |
| 2013–14 | Women's Premier League Southern Division | 3 (Note 2) | 4th of 11 | Katie Poore/ Perry Northeast | Hampshire Cup | Lucy Quinn (20) | FA Cup (Quarter Final), FAWP League Cup (Group Stage) |
| 2014–15 | Women's Premier League Southern Division | 3 | 1st of 12 (Champions) Not promoted due to losing play off game to Northern Division Winners Sheff Utd 0–1 | Perry Northeast | Hampshire Cup | Ini Umotong (29) | FA Cup (4th Round), FAWP League Cup (Semi Final) |
| 2015–16 | Women's Premier League Southern Division | 3 | 5th of 12 | Perry Northeast | Hampshire Cup | Ini Umotong (25) | FA Cup (3rd Round), FAWP League Cup (Prelim Round) |
| 2016–17 | FAWNL Southern Premier Division | 3 | 8th of 11 | Craig Taylor / Jay Sadler | Hampshire Cup | Sammy Quayle (17) | FA Cup (2nd Round), FAWP League Cup (3rd Round) |
| 2017–18 | FAWNL Southern Premier Division | 3 | 6th of 12 | Jay Sadler | Hampshire Cup | Sammy Quayle (18) | FA Cup (3rd Round), FAWP League Cup (2nd Round) |
| 2018–19 | FAWNL Southern Premier Division | 3 | 8th of 12 | Jay Sadler | Hampshire Cup, PDFA Cup | Rachel Panting (17) | FA Cup (2nd Round), FAWN League Plate (2nd round) |
| 2019–20 | FAWNL Southern Premier Division | 3 | Abandoned Season due to Covid lockdown 1 | Jay Sadler | Hampshire Cup, PDFA Cup | Jade Widdows, Becki Bath, Charmaine True (10) | FA Cup (3rd Round), FAWN League Cup (Quarter Final) |
| 2020–21 | FAWNL Southern Premier Division | 3 | 3rd of 12 Abandoned season due to Covid lockdown 2 | Jay Sadler | PDFA Cup | Becki Bath (14) | FA Cup (3rd Round) (Note 3) (Note 4) |
| 2021–22 | FAWNL Southern Premier Division | 3 | 7th of 14 | Jay Sadler | Hampshire Cup, PDFA Cup | Shannon Albuery (32) | FA Cup (3rd Round), FAWN League Plate (Quarter Final) |
| 2022–23 | FAWNL Southern Premier Division | 3 | 4th of 12 | Jay Sadler | PDFA Cup | Sophie Quirk (16) | FA Cup (3rd Round), FAWN League Cup (Semi Final), Hampshire Cup (Semi Final) |
| 2023–24 | FAWNL Southern Premier Division | 3 | 1st of 12 (Champions) Promoted (Note 5) | Jay Sadler | | Sophie Quirk (19) | FA Cup (3rd Round), FAWN League Cup (Semi Final), Hampshire Cup (2nd Round) |
| 2024-25 | Women's Championship | 2 | 9th of 12 | Jay Sadler | | Sophie Quirk (9) | FA Cup (5th Round), League Cup (Group Stage) |
| 2025-26 | Women's Super League 2 (Note 6) | 2 | 12th of 12 (Relegated) | Jay Sadler | | Meg Hornby (7) | FA Cup (3rd Round), League Cup (Group Stage) |
