= 2020–21 Chelsea F.C. Women season =

Chelsea
2020–21 season
- Chairman: Adrian Jacob
- Manager: Emma Hayes
- Stadium: Kingsmeadow
- FA WSL: 1st
- FA Cup: Winners
- League Cup: Winners
- FA Community Shield: Winners
- Champions League: Runners-up
- Top goalscorer: League: Sam Kerr (21); All: Sam Kerr (31)
Home colours	Away colours	Third colours

The 2020–21 season was Chelsea Women's 29th competitive season and 11th consecutive season in the FA Women's Super League, the top flight of English women's football. Chelsea competed in the domestic league as defending champions from the previous season. With a strong showing by the club, the title was successfully retained in addition to winning all domestic trophies offered – the FA Community Shield, the League Cup (Note: Second consecutive win from the previous season.) and the FA Cup. They also finished runners-up in the UEFA Champions League, which was their first appearance as finalists.

== Squad information ==
=== First team squad ===
As of 12 May 2021

No.	Name	Nat	Since	Date of birth (age)	Signed from
Goalkeepers
1	Zećira Mušović	(Sweden)	2021	26 May 1996 (age 30)	(Sweden) Rosengård
28	Carly Telford	(England)	2017	7 July 1987 (age 39)	(England) Notts County
30	Ann-Katrin Berger	(Germany)	2019	9 October 1990 (age 35)	(England) Birmingham City
32	Emily Orman	(England)	2019	5 November 2002 (age 23)	Homegrown
Defenders
3	Hannah Blundell	(England)	2013	25 May 1994 (age 32)	Homegrown
4	Millie Bright	(England)	2014	21 August 1993 (age 32)	(England) Doncaster Rovers Belles
7	Jessica Carter	(England)	2018	27 October 1997 (age 28)	(England) Birmingham City
16	Magdalena Eriksson (captain)	(Sweden)	2017	6 September 1993 (age 32)	(Sweden) Linköpings
25	Jonna Andersson	(Sweden)	2017	2 January 1993 (age 33)	(Sweden) Linköpings
29	Jorja Fox	(England)	2021	28 August 2003 (age 22)	Homegrown
Midfielders
5	Sophie Ingle	(Wales)	2018	2 September 1991 (age 34)	(England) Liverpool
8	Melanie Leupolz	(Germany)	2020	14 April 1994 (age 32)	(Germany) Bayern Munich
10	Ji So-yun	(South Korea)	2014	21 February 1991 (age 35)	(Japan) INAC Kobe Leonessa
11	Guro Reiten	(Norway)	2019	26 July 1994 (age 31)	(Norway) LSK Kvinner
17	Jessie Fleming	(Canada)	2020	11 March 1998 (age 28)	(United States) UCLA Bruins
18	Maren Mjelde	(Norway)	2016	6 November 1989 (age 36)	(Norway) Avaldsnes IL
24	Drew Spence	(England)	2008	23 October 1992 (age 33)	Homegrown
34	Charlotte Wardlaw	(England)	2019	20 February 2003 (age 23)	Homegrown
Forwards
9	Beth England	(England)	2016	3 June 1994 (age 32)	(England) Doncaster Rovers Belles
14	Fran Kirby	(England)	2015	29 June 1993 (age 33)	(England) Reading
20	Sam Kerr	(Australia)	2019	10 September 1993 (age 32)	(United States) Chicago Red Stars
21	Niamh Charles	(England)	2020	21 June 1999 (age 27)	(England) Liverpool
22	Erin Cuthbert	(Scotland)	2016	19 July 1998 (age 27)	(Scotland) Glasgow City
23	Pernille Harder	(Denmark)	2020	15 November 1992 (age 33)	(Germany) Wolfsburg
33	Agnes Beever-Jones	(England)	2021	27 July 2003 (age 22)	Homegrown
On loan
27	Jamie-Lee Napier	(Scotland)	2019	6 April 2000 (age 26)	(Scotland) Hibernian
35	Emily Murphy	(England)	2019	2 March 2003 (age 23)	Homegrown

== New contracts ==
No.	Pos	Player	Contract end	Date	Source
9	FW	Beth England	2024	29 July 2020	
22	FW	(Scotland) Erin Cuthbert	2023	31 July 2020	
11	MF	(Norway) Guro Reiten	2023	5 August 2020	
4	DF	(England) Millie Bright	2023	7 August 2020	
16	DF	(Sweden) Magdalena Eriksson	2023	12 November 2020	
18	MF	(Norway) Maren Mjelde	2022	25 January 2021	
5	MF	(Wales) Sophie Ingle	2023	11 February 2021	
28	GK	(England) Carly Telford	2022	17 February 2021	

== Transfers and loans ==
=== In ===
Pos	Player	Transferred From	Fee	Date	Source
MF	(Germany) Melanie Leupolz	(Germany) Bayern Munich	Undisclosed	23 March 2020	
FW	(England) Niamh Charles	(England) Liverpool	Out of contract	23 June 2020	
MF	(Canada) Jessie Fleming	(United States) UCLA Bruins	Undisclosed	22 July 2020	
FW	(Denmark) Pernille Harder	(Germany) Wolfsburg	£300,000	1 September 2020	
GK	(Sweden) Zećira Mušović	(Sweden) Rosengård	Undisclosed	18 December 2020	

=== Out ===
Pos	Player	Transferred To	Fee	Date	Source
FW	(Finland) Adelina Engman	(France) Montpellier	End of contract	16 June 2020	
DF	(England) Deanna Cooper	(England) Reading	End of contract	17 June 2020	
DF	(England) Anita Asante	(England) Aston Villa	End of contract	19 June 2020	
FW	(Switzerland) Ramona Bachmann	(France) Paris Saint-Germain	Undisclosed	3 July 2020	
MF	(England) Charlotte Fleming	(England) Leicester City	Undisclosed	21 January 2021	
DF	(Norway) Maria Thorisdottir	(England) Manchester United	Undisclosed	22 January 2021	

=== Loan out ===
No.	Pos	Player	To	Date	Until	Fee	Source
27	MF	(Scotland) Jamie-Lee Napier	(England) Birmingham City	6 September 2020	30 June 2021	Free	
35	FW	(England) Emily Murphy	(England) Birmingham City	16 January 2021	30 June 2021	Free	

== Management team ==
Position	Staff
Manager	(England) Emma Hayes
Assistant manager	(England) Paul Green
Assistant coach	(United States) Denise Reddy
Head of technical/Goalkeeping coach	(England) Stuart Searle
Head of performance	(Belgium) Bart Caubergh
Opposition analyst & coach	(England) Leanne Champ

Source: Chelsea F.C.

== Competitions ==
=== Community Shield ===
In August 2020, the FA announced the return of the Women's FA Community Shield for the first time since 2008. The tie was contested between 2019–20 FA WSL champions Chelsea and Manchester City, who qualified as reigning 2019 FA Cup winners due to the unfinished nature of the 2019–20 Women's FA Cup. The match was part of a Wembley double-header on the same day as the men's equivalent.

29 August 2020	Chelsea	2–0	Manchester City	London
12:30 BST	Bright 66'; Cuthbert 90+1'	Report	Scott (yellow card) 19' (yellow-red card) 62'	Stadium: Wembley Stadium; Attendance: 0 (Note: The match was played behind closed doors due to the COVID-19 pandemic in the United Kingdom.); Referee: Rebecca Welch

=== Women's Super League ===
==== League table ====
Pos	Team	Pld	W	D	L	GF	GA	GD	Pts	Qualification or relegation
1	Chelsea (C)	22	18	3	1	69	10	+59	57	Qualification for the Champions League group stage
2	Manchester City	22	17	4	1	65	13	+52	55	Qualification for the Champions League second round
3	Arsenal	22	15	3	4	63	15	+48	48	Qualification for the Champions League first round
4	Manchester United	22	15	2	5	44	20	+24	47	
5	Everton	22	9	5	8	39	30	+9	32	

Source: FA WSL
Rules for classification: 1) Points; 2) Goal difference; 3) Number of goals scored.
(C) Champions

==== Results summary ====
Overall								Home						Away					
Pld	W	D	L	GF	GA	GD	Pts	W	D	L	GF	GA	GD	W	D	L	GF	GA	GD
22	18	3	1	69	10	+59	57	10	0	1	42	6	+36	8	3	0	27	4	+23

Last updated: 9 May 2021.
Source: FA WSL

==== Results by matchday ====
Matchday	1	2	3	4	5	6	7	8	9	10	11	12	13	14	15	16	17	18	19	20	21	22
Result	D	W	W	W	W	W	D	W	W	P	W	W	L	W	W	W	W	W	W	W	W	W
Position	5	3	3	3	4	3	3	2	2	3	2	1	1	1	1	1	1	1	1	1	1	1

Updated to match(es) played on 9 May 2021. Source: FA WSL
W = Win; D = Draw; L = Loss

==== Matches ====
6 September 2020 1	Manchester United	1–1	Chelsea	Leigh
14:30 BST	Ökvist (yellow card) 76'; Galton 79'; Zelem (yellow card) 85'	Report	Kerr 25'	Stadium: Leigh Sports Village; Attendance: 0 (Note: The match was played behind closed doors due to the COVID-19 pandemic in the United Kingdom.); Referee: Rebecca Welch

13 September 2020 2	Chelsea	9–0	Bristol City	Kingston upon Thames
12:30 BST	Kirby 15'; Mjelde 31' (pen.); Leupolz 34'; Cuthbert 36'; Bright 40'; England 66'; Charles 69'; Harder 73'; Kerr 86'	Report	Bryson (yellow card) 90+3'	Stadium: Kingsmeadow; Attendance: 0 Referee: Stacey Pearson

4 October 2020 3	Birmingham City	0–1	Chelsea	Solihull
14:00 BST		Report	Kirby 9'	Stadium: SportNation.Bet Stadium; Attendance: 0 Referee: Abigail Bryne

11 October 2020 4	Chelsea	3–1	Manchester City	Kingston upon Thames
14:00 BST	Bright (yellow card) 33'; Mjelde 36' (pen.) (yellow card) 88'; Kerr 57'; Kirby 79'	Report	White (yellow card) 36'; Mewis (yellow card) 45+3'; Kelly 73' (pen.)	Stadium: Kingsmeadow; Attendance: 0 Referee: Rebecca Welch

17 October 2020 5	Aston Villa	0–4	Chelsea	Walsall
14:00 BST	Hanssen (yellow card) 45'	Report	Kerr 3'; England 35'; Harder 68'; Eriksson 70'; Bright (yellow card) 71'	Stadium: Bescot Stadium; Attendance: 0 Referee: Helen Conley
Note: The match was played on 27 January 2021.

8 November 2020 6	Chelsea	4–0	Everton	Kingston upon Thames
15:00 GMT (UTC+00:00)	Ji 16'; Bright (yellow card) 65'; England 73', 76'; Harder 90+7'	Report	Emslie (yellow card) 64'	Stadium: Kingsmeadow; Attendance: 0 Referee: Abigail Byrne

15 November 2020 7	Arsenal	1–1	Chelsea	Borehamwood
15:00 GMT (UTC+00:00)	Maier (yellow card) 33'; Mead 86'	Report	Ji (yellow card) 63'; Wubben-Moy 90' (o.g.)	Stadium: Meadow Park; Attendance: 0 Referee: Kirsty Dowle

6 December 2020 8	Chelsea	3–2	West Ham United	Kingston upon Thames
15:00 GMT (UTC+00:00)	Kerr 15', 55', 68'	Report	Daly (yellow card) 33' (goal) 47'; Eriksson 88' (o.g.)	Stadium: Kingsmeadow; Attendance: 700; Referee: Rebecca Welch

13 December 2020 9	Brighton & Hove Albion	0–1	Chelsea	Crawley
15:00 GMT (UTC+00:00)		Report	Kerr 21'	Stadium: The People's Pension Stadium; Attendance: 457; Referee: Lisa Benn

10 January 2021 10	Reading	0–5	Chelsea	Reading
14:00 GMT (UTC+00:00)	Williams (yellow card) 45+1'; Moloney (yellow card) 45+2'	Report	Kirby 16', 23', 45+2', 53'; Ji 86'	Stadium: Madejski Stadium; Attendance: 0 Referee: Abigail Bryne

17 January 2021 11	Chelsea	2–1	Manchester United	Kingston upon Thames
15:00 GMT (UTC+00:00)	Harder 30'; Kirby 65'; Reiten (yellow card) 90+5'	Report	James 61'; Groenen (yellow card) 75'	Stadium: Kingsmeadow; Attendance: 0 Referee: Rebecca Welch

31 January 2021 12	Chelsea	4–0	Tottenham Hotspur	Kingston upon Thames
12:30 GMT (UTC+00:00)	Leupolz 27', 63' (pen.); McManus 29' (o.g.); Kerr 38'	Report		Stadium: Kingsmeadow; Attendance: 0 Referee: Sarah Garratt

7 February 2021 13	Chelsea	1–2	Brighton & Hove Albion	Kingston upon Thames
14:00 GMT (UTC+00:00)	Kerr 5'	Report	Whelan 8'; Connolly 78'; Bance (yellow card) 90+3'	Stadium: Kingsmeadow; Attendance: 0 Referee: Cristiana Hattersley

10 February 2021 14	Chelsea	3–0	Arsenal	Kingston upon Thames
15:00 GMT (UTC+00:00)	Leupolz (yellow card) 22'; Ji (yellow card) 43'; Harder 48', 58'; Kirby 90'	Report	Williamson (yellow card) 89'	Stadium: Kingsmeadow; Attendance: 0 Referee: Amy Fearn

14 February 2021 15	Bristol City	0–5	Chelsea	Bath
15:00 GMT (UTC+00:00)		Report	Kirby 14', 40'; Harder 36'; Kerr 55'; England 60'	Stadium: Twerton Park; Attendance: 0 Referee: Emily Heaslip

7 March 2021 16	West Ham United	0–2	Chelsea	Dagenham
15:00 GMT (UTC+00:00)		Report	Kerr 7'; England 47'	Stadium: Victoria Road; Attendance: 0 Referee: Robert Whitton

17 March 2021 17	Everton	0–3	Chelsea	Liverpool
15:00 GMT (UTC+00:00)	Raso (yellow card) 49'	Report	Kirby 14'; Harder 60'; Leupolz (yellow card) 72' (goal) 79'	Stadium: Walton Hall Park; Attendance: 0 Referee: Emily Heaslip

28 March 2021 18	Chelsea	2–0	Aston Villa	Kingston upon Thames
14:00 BST	Kerr 24', 57'	Report	McLoughlin (yellow card) 75'	Stadium: Kingsmeadow; Attendance: 0 Referee: Sarah Garratt

4 April 2021 19	Chelsea	6–0	Birmingham City	Kingston upon Thames
14:00 BST	Kerr 25', 45', 45+3'; Kirby 61', 90+1'; Reiten 73'; Spence (yellow card) 80'	Report	Littlejohn (yellow card) 45+2'	Stadium: Kingsmeadow; Attendance: 0 Referee: Jane Simms

21 April 2021 20	Manchester City	2–2	Chelsea	Manchester
14:00 BST	Kelly 29'; Hemp 74'; Greenwood (yellow card) 77'	Report	Kerr 25'; Harder 34' (pen.)	Stadium: Academy Stadium; Attendance: 0 Referee: Rebecca Welch

6 May 2021 21	Tottenham Hotspur	0–2	Chelsea	Canons Park
14:00 BST	McManus (yellow card) 90+1'	Report	Kerr 41', 52'	Stadium: The Hive Stadium; Attendance: 0 Referee: Amy Fearns

8 May 2021 22	Chelsea	5–0	Reading	Kingston upon Thames
14:00 BST	Leupolz 2'; Kirby 43', 57'; Kerr 71'; Cuthbert 75'	Report		Stadium: Kingsmeadow; Attendance: 0 Referee: Stacey Pearson

=== FA Cup ===
16 April 2021 Fourth round proper	Chelsea	5–0	London City Lionesses	Kingston upon Thames
19:00 GMT (UTC+00:00)	Charles 21'; Carter 29'; Leupolz 35'; Spence 56', 79'	Report		Stadium: Kingsmeadow; Attendance: 0 Referee: Chloe Anderson

20 May 2021 Fifth round proper	Chelsea	3–0	Everton	Kingston upon Thames
20:00 GMT (UTC+00:00)	Reiten 29'; Kerr 77'; Spence 86'	Report		Stadium: Kingsmeadow; Attendance: 0 Referee: Kirsty Dowle

29 September 2021 Quarter-final	Birmingham City	0–4	Chelsea	Birmingham
19:45		Report	Kerr 61'; Kirby 70', 72'; Harder 90+3'	Stadium: St Andrew's; Referee: Elizabeth Simms

31 October 2021 Semi-final	Manchester City	0–3	Chelsea	Manchester
12:45		Report	Cuthbert 23'; Leupolz 28'; England 89'	Stadium: Academy Stadium; Referee: Rebecca Welch

5 December 2021 Final	Arsenal	0–3	Chelsea	Wembley
14:00 WET (UTC+0)		Report	Kirby 3'; Kerr 56', 78'	Stadium: Wembley; Attendance: 40,942; Referee: Helen Conley

=== League Cup ===
Pos	Team	Pld	W	WPEN	LPEN	L	GF	GA	GD	Pts	Qualification	CHE	ARS	TOT	LCL
1	Chelsea	2	2	0	0	0	6	1	+5	6	Advanced to knock-out stage	—	4–1	2–0	—
2	Arsenal	3	1	1	0	1	7	6	+1	5	Possible knock-out stage based on ranking	—	—	2–2	—
3	Tottenham Hotspur	3	1	0	1	1	6	4	+2	4		—	—	—	4–0
4	London City Lionesses	2	0	0	0	2	0	8	−8	0		C–C (Note: Match originally postponed following three positive COVID-19 tests by London City Lionesses players. An independent tribunal determined the fixture would not be rescheduled as it would have no effect on qualifying.)	0–4	—	—

Source: thefa.com
Rules for classification: 1) Points; 2) Goal difference; 3) Number of goals scored; 4) Number of wins; 5) Head-to-head record

==== Group B ====
7 October 2020 1	Chelsea	4–1	Arsenal	Kingston upon Thames
19:00 BST	Eriksson 5'; Reiten 10', 15'; Ingle (yellow card) 31'; England 90'	Report	Foord 8' van de Donk (yellow card) 67'	Stadium: Kingsmeadow; Attendance: 0 Referee: Scott Jackson

3 November 2020 2	Chelsea	2–0	Tottenham Hotspur	Kingston upon Thames
19:00 GMT (UTC+00:00)	Fleming (yellow card) 67'; Cuthbert 70'; Leupolz 84' (pen.)	Report	Neville (yellow card) 90'	Stadium: Kingsmeadow; Attendance: 0 Referee: Emily Heaslip

18 November 2020 3	London City Lionesses	Postponed	Chelsea	Dartford
19:30 GMT (UTC+00:00)		Report		Stadium: Princes Park
Note: Postponed after two first-team players and one member of staff at City Lionesses tested positive for COVID-19.

==== Knockout phase ====
20 January 2021 Quarter-final	Manchester City	2–4 (a.e.t.)	Chelsea	Manchester
17:30 GMT (UTC+00:00)	Kelly 52'; Hemp 85'	Report	Leupolz 43'; Charles 89'; Reiten 95'; Ingle 105'	Stadium: Academy Stadium; Attendance: 0 Referee: Ritchie Watkins

3 February 2021 Semi-final	Chelsea	6–0	West Ham United	Kingston upon Thames
15:00 GMT (UTC+00:00)	Harder 4', 25', 86'; Ingle 15'; England 27'; Kirby 69'	Report	Leon (yellow card) 59'; Longhurst (yellow card) 90+2'	Stadium: Kingsmeadow; Attendance: 0 Referee: Stacey Pearson

14 March 2021 Final	Bristol City	0–6	Chelsea	Watford
14:30 GMT (UTC+00:00)	Palmer (yellow card) 77'; Rafferty (yellow card) 90+6'	Report	Kerr 3', 10', 48'; Kirby 28', 34'; Reiten 55'	Stadium: Vicarage Road; Attendance: 0 Referee: Abi Byrne

=== Champions League ===
==== Round of 32 ====
9 December 2020 First leg	Benfica (Portugal)	0–5	Chelsea	Lisbon
16:00 WET (UTC+00:00)	Ucheibe (yellow card) 28' (yellow-red card) 76'	Report	Kirby 2', 33'; Bright 29'; Harder 45'; England 54'; Cuthbert (yellow card) 77'	Stadium: Estádio da Tapadinha; Attendance: 0 (Behind-closed-doors); Referee: Esther Staubli (Switzerland)

16 December 2020 Second leg	Chelsea	3–0	(Portugal) Benfica	Kingston upon Thames
20:00 WET (UTC+00:00)	England 28', 90+1'; Kerr 65'	Report	Vitória (yellow card) 59'; Cameirão (yellow card) 84'	Stadium: Kingsmeadow; Attendance: 0 (Behind-closed-doors); Referee: Lina Lehtovaara (Finland)

==== Round of 16 ====
3 March 2021 First leg	Chelsea	2–0	(Spain) Atlético Madrid	Kingston upon Thames
19:00 WET (UTC+00:00)	Ingle (red card) 12'; Ji (yellow card) 56'; Mjelde 58' (pen.); Kirby 64'; Kerr (yellow card) 90'	Report	Castellanos (yellow card) 44'	Stadium: Kingsmeadow; Attendance: 0 (Behind-closed-doors); Referee: Tess Olofsson (Sweden)

10 March 2021 Second leg	Atlético Madrid (Spain)	1–1	Chelsea	Monza
13:30 WET (CET+00:00)	García (yellow card) 77'; Laurent 90+3'	Report	Charles (yellow card) 74'; Mjelde 78' (pen.)	Stadium: Brianteo Stadium; Attendance: 0 (Behind-closed-doors); Referee: Stéphanie Frappart (France)

Note: Location moved to Italy because of travel restrictions due to COVID-19.

==== Quarter-finals ====
24 March 2021 First leg	Chelsea	2–1	(Germany) VfL Wolfsburg	Budapest
17:00 WET (UTC+00:00)	Kerr 55'; Charles (yellow card) 60'; Harder 66'; Leupolz (yellow card) 90+1'	Report	Popp (yellow card) 16'; Doorsoun (yellow card) 18'; Janssen 70' (pen.); Oberdorf (yellow card) 83'	Stadium: Szusza Ferenc Stadion; Attendance: 0 (Behind-closed-doors); Referee: Jana Adamkova (Czech Republic)

31 March 2021 Second leg	VfL Wolfsburg (Germany)	0–3	Chelsea	Budapest
14:00 WET (CET+00:00)		Report	Harder 27' (pen.); Kerr 31'; Kirby (yellow card) 56' (goal) 80'	Stadium: Szusza Ferenc Stadion; Attendance: 0 (Behind-closed-doors); Referee: Anastasia Pustovoytova(Russia)

Note: Location for both legs moved to Budapest because of travel restrictions due to the COVID-19 pandemic.

==== Semi-finals ====
25 April 2021 First leg	Bayern Munich (Germany)	2–1	Chelsea	Munich
17:00 WET (UTC+00:00)	Lohmann 12'; Zadrazil (yellow card) 22'; Glas 56'	Report	Leupolz 23'; Harder (yellow card) 33'	Stadium: FC Bayern Campus; Attendance: 0 (Behind-closed-doors); Referee: Sara Persson (Sweden)

2 May 2021 Second leg	Chelsea	4–1	(Germany) Bayern Munich	Kingston upon Thames
13:30 WET (UTC+00:00)	Kirby 10', 90+5'; Ji 43'; Carter (yellow card) 47'; Harder 84'	Report	Zadrazil 29'; Magull (yellow card) 42'; Simon (yellow card) 74'; Beerensteyn (yellow card) 83'	Stadium: Kingsmeadow; Attendance: 0 (Behind-closed-doors); Referee: Esther Staubli (Switzerland)

==== Final ====
16 May 2021 Final	Chelsea	0–4	(Spain) Barcelona	Gothenburg
13:30 WET (UTC+00:00)		Report	Leupolz 1' (o.g.); Putellas 14' (pen.); Bonmatí 21'; Hansen 36'	Stadium: Gamla Ullevi; Attendance: 0 (Note: The final was played behind closed doors due to the COVID-19 pandemic in Sweden.); Referee: Riem Hussein (Germany)

== Statistics ==
=== Appearances and goals ===
As of 5 December 2021

No.	Pos	Nat	Player	Total		FA WSL		FA Cup		League Cup		Champions League		Community Shield	
No.	Pos	Nat	Player	Apps	Goals	Apps	Goals	Apps	Goals	Apps	Goals	Apps	Goals	Apps	Goals
Goalkeepers:
1	GK	(Sweden) SWE	Zećira Mušović	3	0	2	0	1	0	0	0	0	0	0	0
28	GK	(England) ENG	Carly Telford	6	0	3	0	1	0	1	0	1	0	0	0
30	GK	(Germany) GER	Ann-Katrin Berger	33	0	17	0	3	0	4	0	8	0	1	0
32	GK	(England) ENG	Emily Orman	0	0	0	0	0	0	0	0	0	0	0	0
Defenders:
3	DF	(England) ENG	Hannah Blundell	13	0	4+4	0	1	0	0+2	0	1+1	0	0	0
4	DF	(England) ENG	Millie Bright	40	3	20+1	1	4	0	5	0	9	1	1	1
7	DF	(England) ENG	Jessica Carter	21	1	3+6	0	5	1	0+1	0	5+1	0	0	0
16	DF	(Sweden) SWE	Magdalena Eriksson	36	2	19+1	1	4	0	5	1	5+1	0	1	0
25	DF	(Sweden) SWE	Jonna Andersson	34	0	18+1	0	2+1	0	5	0	6	0	1	0
29	DF	(England) ENG	Jorja Fox	3	0	0+1	0	2	0	0	0	0	0	0	0
3	DF	(Netherlands) NED	Aniek Nouwen	3	0	0	0	2+1	0	0	0	0	0	0	0
Midfielders:
5	MF	(Wales) WAL	Sophie Ingle	37	2	13+5	0	3+2	0	3+2	2	8	0	1	0
8	MF	(Germany) GER	Melanie Leupolz	35	10	17+2	5	4	2	4	2	7	1	1	0
10	MF	(South Korea) KOR	Ji So-yun	33	3	16+3	2	0+1	0	4	0	7+1	1	1	0
11	MF	(Norway) NOR	Guro Reiten	36	6	9+10	1	3	1	2+3	4	3+5	0	1	0
17	MF	(Canada) CAN	Jessie Fleming	29	0	3+11	0	2+3	0	1+4	0	1+3	0	0+1	0
18	MF	(Norway) NOR	Maren Mjelde	23	4	14+1	2	0	0	4	0	3	2	1	0
24	MF	(England) ENG	Drew Spence	18	3	2+6	0	2+3	3	0+2	0	0+3	0	0	0
34	MF	(England) ENG	Charlotte Wardlaw	1	0	0	0	1	0	0	0	0	0	0	0
Forwards:
9	FW	(England) ENG	Beth England	35	12	10+9	6	2+3	1	2+2	2	4+2	3	0+1	0
14	FW	(England) ENG	Fran Kirby	34	28	16+2	16	2+1	3	2+1	3	8+1	6	1	0
20	FW	(Australia) AUS	Sam Kerr	38	31	19+3	21	2+1	4	4	3	8	3	1	0
21	FW	(England) ENG	Niamh Charles	30	3	7+6	1	1+3	1	2+2	1	5+3	0	0+1	0
22	FW	(Scotland) SCO	Erin Cuthbert	37	6	14+5	2	5	2	2+3	1	2+5	0	0+1	1
23	FW	(Denmark) DEN	Pernille Harder	38	17	15+7	9	0+3	1	4	3	8+1	4	0	0
33	FW	(England) ENG	Agnes Beever-Jones	3	0	0+2	0	1	0	0	0	0	0	0	0
Players have left the club:
2	DF	(Norway) NOR	Maria Thorisdottir	5	0	1+1	0	0	0	1+1	0	0+1	0	0	0
27	MF	(Scotland) SCO	Jamie-Lee Napier	0	0	0	0	0	0	0	0	0	0	0	0
31	MF	(England) ENG	Charlotte Fleming	0	0	0	0	0	0	0	0	0	0	0	0
35	FW	(England) ENG	Emily Murphy	0	0	0	0	0	0	0	0	0	0	0	0

- Source: Chelsea F.C.

=== Goalscorers ===
Includes all competitive matches. The list is sorted by squad number when total goals are equal.

As of 5 December 2021

Rank	Pos.	No.	Player	FA WSL	FA Cup	League Cup	Champions League	Community Shield	Total
1	FW	20	(Australia) Sam Kerr	21	4	3	3	0	31
2	FW	14	(England) Fran Kirby	16	3	3	6	0	28
3	FW	23	(Denmark) Pernille Harder	9	1	3	4	0	17
4	FW	9	Beth England	6	1	2	3	0	12
5	MF	8	(Germany) Melanie Leupolz	5	2	2	1	0	10
6	MF	11	(Norway) Guro Reiten	1	1	4	0	0	6
7	FW	22	(Scotland) Erin Cuthbert	2	1	1	0	1	5
8	MF	18	(Norway) Maren Mjelde	2	0	0	2	0	4
9	DF	4	(England) Millie Bright	1	0	0	1	1	3
9	MF	10	(South Korea) Ji So-yun	2	0	0	1	0	3
9	FW	21	(England) Niamh Charles	1	1	1	0	0	3
9	MF	24	(England) Drew Spence	0	3	0	0	0	3
13	MF	5	(Wales) Sophie Ingle	0	0	2	0	0	2
13	DF	16	(Sweden) Magdalena Eriksson	1	0	1	0	0	2
15	DF	7	(England) Jessica Carter	0	1	0	0	0	1
Own goal				2	0	0	0	0	2
Total				69	17	22	21	2	131

=== Assists ===
Includes all competitive matches. The list is sorted by squad number when total assists are equal.

As of 5 December 2021

Rank	Pos.	No.	Player	FA WSL	FA Cup	League Cup	Champions League	Community Shield	Total
1	FW	14	(England) Fran Kirby	11	1	5	2	0	19
2	FW	20	(Australia) Sam Kerr	8	2	1	2	0	13
3	MF	11	(Norway) Guro Reiten	3	1	2	7	0	12
4	FW	9	Beth England	9	1	0	1	0	11
5	FW	22	(Scotland) Erin Cuthbert	7	1	0	1	0	9
6	FW	23	(Denmark) Pernille Harder	3	0	0	1	0	4
7	MF	10	(South Korea) Ji So-yun	1	0	1	0	1	3
7	MF	18	(Norway) Maren Mjelde	1	2	0	0	0	3
9	DF	2	(Norway) Maria Thorisdottir	0	0	2	0	0	2
9	DF	7	(England) Jessica Carter	1	0	0	1	0	2
9	MF	8	(Germany) Melanie Leupolz	1	1	0	0	0	2
9	FW	21	(England) Niamh Charles	1	1	0	0	0	2
13	DF	3	(England) Hannah Blundell	0	1	0	0	0	1
13	DF	4	(England) Millie Bright	1	0	0	0	0	1
13	DF	5	(Wales) Sophie Ingle	1	0	0	0	0	1
13	MF	17	(Canada) Jessie Fleming	0	1	0	0	0	1
13	GK	30	(Germany) Ann-Katrin Berger	1	0	0	0	0	1
Total				49	12	11	15	1	88

=== Clean sheets ===
Includes all competitive matches. The list is sorted by squad number when total clean sheets are equal.

As of 5 December 2021

Rank	Pos.	No.	Player	FA WSL	FA Cup	League Cup	Champions League	Community Shield	Total
1	GK	30	(Germany) Ann-Katrin Berger	12	3	3	3	1	22
2	GK	28	(England) Carly Telford	1	1	0	1	0	3
3	GK	1	(Sweden) Zećira Mušović	2	0	0	0	0	2
Total				15	4	3	4	1	27

=== Disciplinary records ===
Includes all competitive matches. The list is sorted by squad number when total disciplinary records are equal.

As of 5 December 2021

Pos.	No.	Name	FA WSL		FA Cup		League Cup		Champions League		Community Shield		Total	
Pos.	No.	Name	Booked	Sent off (straight red)	Booked	Sent off (straight red)	Booked	Sent off (straight red)	Booked	Sent off (straight red)	Booked	Sent off (straight red)	Booked	Sent off (straight red)
DF	4	(England) Millie Bright	3	0	0	0	0	0	0	0	0	0	3	0
MF	8	(Germany) Melanie Leupolz	2	0	0	0	0	0	1	0	0	0	3	0
MF	10	(South Korea) Ji So-yun	2	0	0	0	0	0	1	0	0	0	3	0
MF	5	(Wales) Sophie Ingle	0	0	0	0	1	0	1	1	0	0	2	1
FW	21	(England) Niamh Charles	0	0	0	0	0	0	2	0	0	0	2	0
FW	22	(Scotland) Erin Cuthbert	0	0	1	0	0	0	1	0	0	0	2	0
DF	7	(England) Jessica Carter	0	0	0	0	0	0	1	0	0	0	1	0
MF	11	(Norway) Guro Reiten	0	0	0	0	0	0	1	0	0	0	1	0
FW	14	(England) Fran Kirby	0	0	0	0	0	0	1	0	0	0	1	0
MF	17	(Canada) Jessie Fleming	0	0	0	0	1	0	0	0	0	0	1	0
MF	18	(Norway) Maren Mjelde	1	0	0	0	0	0	0	0	0	0	1	0
FW	20	(Australia) Sam Kerr	0	0	0	0	0	0	1	0	0	0	1	0
FW	23	(Denmark) Pernille Harder	0	0	0	0	0	0	1	0	0	0	1	0
MF	24	(England) Drew Spence	1	0	0	0	0	0	0	0	0	0	1	0
Total			9	0	1	0	2	0	10	1	0	0	22	1

== Awards ==
No.	Pos.	Player/Manager	Award	Source
—	—	(England) Emma Hayes	FA WSL Manager of the Month (January)	
—	—	(England) Emma Hayes	FA WSL Manager of the Year	
4	DF	(England) Millie Bright	FIFA FIFPro Women's World 11 (2020)	
14	FW	(England) Fran Kirby	FA WSL Player of the Month (January)	
14	FW	(England) Fran Kirby	London Football Awards Women's Player of the Year: Women's Super League Player of the Year	
14	FW	(England) Fran Kirby	FA WSL Player of the Year	
14	FW	(England) Fran Kirby	PFA Team of the Year	
14	FW	(England) Fran Kirby	PFA Women's Player of the Year	
16	DF	(Sweden) Magdalena Eriksson	UEFA.com fans' Women's Team of the Year 2020	
16	DF	(Sweden) Magdalena Eriksson	PFA Team of the Year	
18	MF	(Norway) Maren Mjelde	PFA Team of the Year	
20	FW	(Australia) Sam Kerr	FA WSL Player of the Month (May)	
20	FW	(Australia) Sam Kerr	FA WSL Golden Boot	
20	FW	(Australia) Sam Kerr	PFA Team of the Year	
21	FW	(England) Niamh Charles	London Football Awards Women's Young Player of the Year: 2021	
23	FW	(Denmark) Pernille Harder	UEFA Women's Player of the Year	
23	FW	(Denmark) Pernille Harder	The 100 best female footballers in the world 2020 (#1)	
23	FW	(Denmark) Pernille Harder	UEFA.com fans' Women's Team of the Year 2020	
23	FW	(Denmark) Pernille Harder	FIFA FIFPro Women's World 11 (2020)	
28	GK	(England) Carly Telford	PFA Community Champion Award	
30	GK	(Germany) Ann-Katrin Berger	FA WSL Golden Glove	
30	GK	(Germany) Ann-Katrin Berger	PFA Team of the Year	
