= 2020–21 UEFA Women's Champions League knockout phase =

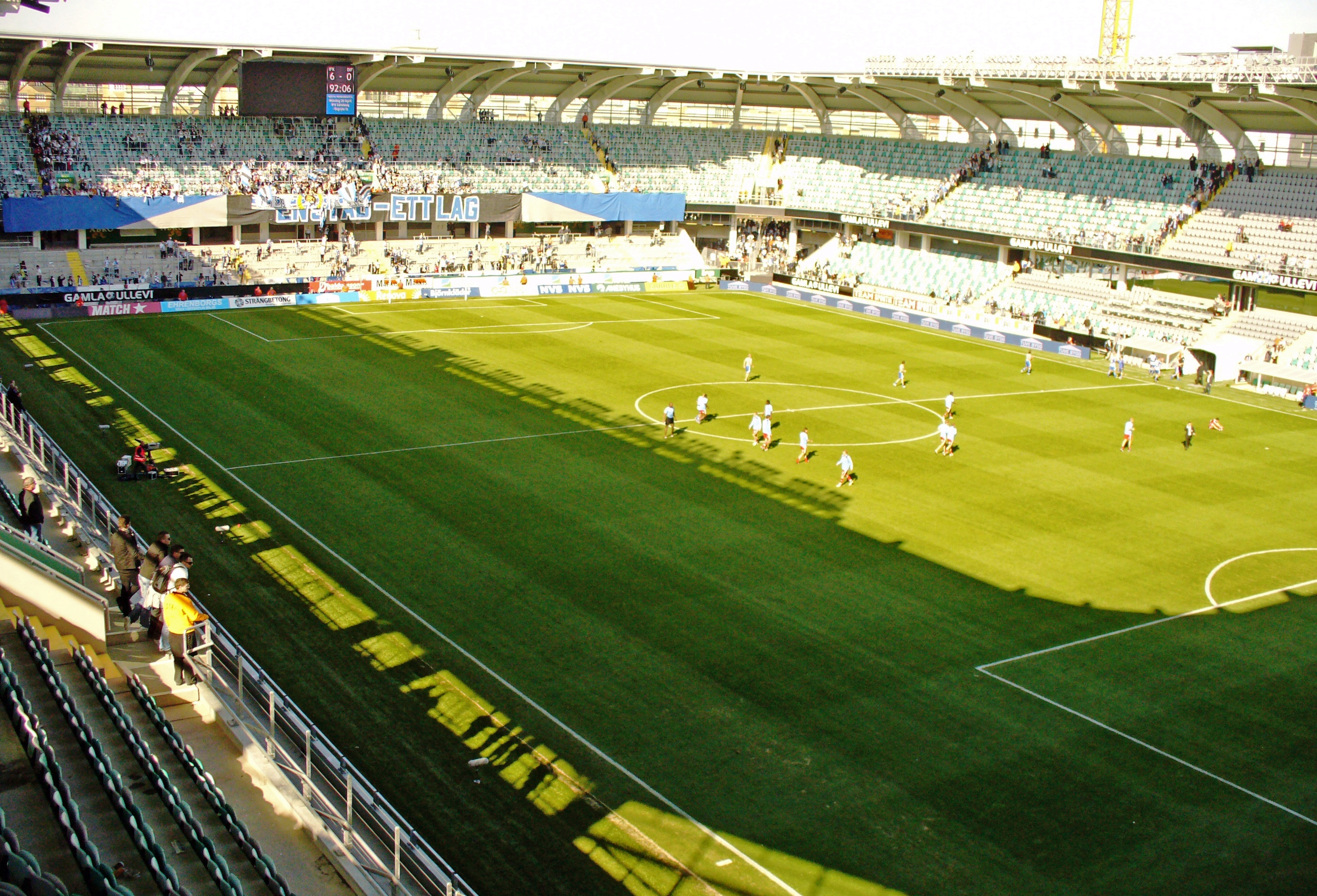
- The Gamla Ullevi in Gothenburg hosted the final.

Tournament details
- Dates: 9 December 2020 – 16 May 2021
- Teams: 32 (from 21 associations)

Tournament statistics
- Matches played: 59
- Goals scored: 201 (3.41 per match)
- Attendance: 1,188 (20 per match)
- Top scorer(s): (Spain) Jennifer Hermoso (England) Fran Kirby (6 goals each)

The 2020–21 UEFA Women's Champions League knockout phase began on 9 December 2020 with the round of 32 and ended with the final on 16 May 2021 at the Gamla Ullevi in Gothenburg, Sweden, to decide the champions of the 2020–21 UEFA Women's Champions League. A total of 32 teams competed in the knockout phase.

== Qualified teams ==
The knockout phase involved 32 teams: 22 teams which received a bye, and the ten winners of the second qualifying round.

Below are the 32 teams that participated in the knockout phase (with their 2020 UEFA women's club coefficients, which took into account their performance in European competitions from 2015–16 to 2019–20 plus 33% of their association coefficient from the same time span).

Bye to round of 32
Team	Coeff.
(France) Lyon (Title holders)	145.680
(Germany) VfL Wolfsburg	114.090
(Spain) Barcelona	102.140
(France) Paris Saint-Germain	98.680
(Germany) Bayern Munich	78.090
(England) Manchester City	69.645
(Czech Republic) Slavia Prague	65.365
(England) Chelsea	63.645
(Sweden) Rosengård	59.015
(Spain) Atlético Madrid	47.140
(Denmark) Fortuna Hjørring	46.385
(Denmark) Brøndby	45.385
(Norway) LSK Kvinner	44.075
(Kazakhstan) BIIK Kazygurt	33.570
(Switzerland) Zürich	34.920
(Czech Republic) Sparta Prague	31.365
(Italy) Fiorentina	29.365
(Netherlands) Ajax	23.890
(Sweden) Kopparbergs/Göteborg	20.015
(Italy) Juventus	17.065
(Netherlands) PSV Eindhoven	10.890
(Switzerland) Servette Chênois	7.920

Winners of second qualifying round
Team	Coeff.
(Scotland) Glasgow City	36.590
(Belarus) FC Minsk	25.270
(Austria) St. Pölten	23.950
(Serbia) Spartak Subotica	20.615
(Norway) Vålerenga	9.075
(Poland) Górnik Łęczna	8.285
(Slovenia) Pomurje	6.980
(Ukraine) Zhytlobud-2 Kharkiv	4.800
(Portugal) Benfica	3.960
(Georgia (country)) Lanchkhuti	0.000

== Format ==
Each tie in the knockout phase, apart from the final, was played over two legs, with each team playing one leg at home. The team that scored more goals on aggregate over the two legs advanced to the next round. If the aggregate score was level, the away goals rule was applied, i.e. the team that scored more goals away from home over the two legs advanced. If away goals were also equal, then extra time was played. The away goals rule was again applied after extra time, i.e. if there were goals scored during extra time and the aggregate score was still level, the visiting team advanced by virtue of more away goals scored. If no goals were scored during extra time, the tie was decided by a penalty shoot-out. In the final, which was played as a single match, if the score was level at the end of normal time, extra time would be played, followed by a penalty shoot-out if the score remained tied.

The mechanism of the draws for each round was as follows:

- In the draw for the round of 32, the sixteen teams with the highest UEFA women's club coefficients were seeded (with the title holders being the automatic top seed), and the other sixteen teams were unseeded. The seeded teams were drawn against the unseeded teams, with the seeded teams hosting the second leg. Teams from the same association could not be drawn against each other.
- In the draw for the round of 16, the eight teams with the highest UEFA women's club coefficients were seeded (with the title holders being the automatic top seed should they qualify), and the other eight teams were unseeded. The seeded teams were drawn against the unseeded teams, with the order of legs decided by draw. Teams from the same association could not be drawn against each other.
- In the draws for the quarter-finals and semi-finals, there were no seedings, and teams from the same association could be drawn against each other. As the draws for the quarter-finals and semi-finals were held together before the quarter-finals were played, the identity of the teams in the semi-finals were not known at the time of the draw. A draw was also held to determine the "home" team for the final (for administrative purposes as it was played at a neutral venue).

== Schedule ==
The schedule of the competition was as follows (all draws were held at the UEFA headquarters in Nyon, Switzerland).

Round	Draw date	First leg	Second leg
Round of 32	24 November 2020	9–10 December 2020	15–17 December 2020
Round of 16	16 February 2021	3–4 March 2021	10–11 March 2021
Quarter-finals	12 March 2021	24 March 2021	31 March – 1 April 2021
Semi-finals	12 March 2021	24–25 April 2021	1–2 May 2021
Final	12 March 2021	16 May 2021 at Gamla Ullevi, Gothenburg	

== Bracket ==
Round of 32
(Ukraine) Zhytlobud-2 Kharkiv	2	0	2
(Kazakhstan) BIIK Kazygurt (a)	1	1	2
(Netherlands) Ajax	1	0	1
(Germany) Bayern Munich	3	3	6
(Georgia (country)) Lanchkhuti	0	0	0
(Sweden) Rosengård	7	10	17
(Austria) St. Pölten	2	1	3
(Switzerland) Zürich	0	0	0
(Portugal) Benfica	0	0	0
(England) Chelsea	5	3	8
(Switzerland) Servette Chênois	2	0	2
(Spain) Atlético Madrid	4	5	9
(Serbia) Spartak Subotica	0	0	0
(Germany) VfL Wolfsburg	5	2	7
(Belarus) FC Minsk	0	1	1
(Norway) LSK Kvinner	2	0	2
(Poland) Górnik Łęczna	0	1	1
(France) Paris Saint-Germain	2	6	8
(Czech Republic) Sparta Prague	2	1	3
(Scotland) Glasgow City	1	0	1
(Italy) Juventus	2	0	2
(France) Lyon	3	3	6
(Norway) Vålerenga	1 (4)
(Denmark) Brøndby (p)	1 (5)
(Netherlands) PSV	1	1	2
(Spain) Barcelona	4	4	8
(Slovenia) Pomurje	0	2	2
(Denmark) Fortuna Hjørring	3	3	6
(Sweden) Kopparbergs/Göteborg	1	0	1
(England) Manchester City	2	3	5
(Italy) Fiorentina	2	1	3
(Czech Republic) Slavia Prague	2	0	2

Round of 16
(Kazakhstan) BIIK Kazygurt	1	0	1
(Germany) Bayern Munich	6	3	9
(Sweden) Rosengård	2	2	4
(Austria) St. Pölten	2	0	2
(England) Chelsea	2	1	3
(Spain) Atlético Madrid	0	1	1
(Germany) VfL Wolfsburg	2	2	4
(Norway) LSK Kvinner	0	0	0
(France) Paris Saint-Germain	5	0	5
(Czech Republic) Sparta Prague	0	3	3
(France) Lyon	2	3	5
(Denmark) Brøndby	0	1	1
(Spain) Barcelona	4	5	9
(Denmark) Fortuna Hjørring	0	0	0
(England) Manchester City	3	5	8
(Italy) Fiorentina	0	0	0

Quarter-finals
(Germany) Bayern Munich	3	1	4
(Sweden) Rosengård	0	0	0
(England) Chelsea	2	3	5
(Germany) VfL Wolfsburg	1	0	1
(France) Paris Saint-Germain (a)	0	2	2
(France) Lyon	1	1	2
(Spain) Barcelona	3	1	4
(England) Manchester City	0	2	2

Semi-finals
(Germany) Bayern Munich	2	1	3
(England) Chelsea	1	4	5
(France) Paris Saint-Germain	1	1	2
(Spain) Barcelona	1	2	3

Final
16 May – Gothenburg
(England) Chelsea	0
(Spain) Barcelona	4

== Round of 32 ==
The draw for the round of 32 was held on 24 November 2020, 12:00 CET.

=== Seeding ===
The 32 teams, including the 22 teams which received a bye and the ten winners of the second qualifying round, were seeded based on their UEFA women's club coefficients (the title holders were automatically seeded first). Prior to the draw, they were divided into four groups of eight teams, each containing four seeded teams and four unseeded teams, based on the restriction that teams from the same association could not be drawn against each other, and COVID-19 travel restrictions. The teams in each group were assigned a number, with seeded teams randomly assigned 1 to 4, and unseeded teams randomly assigned 5 to 8. Eight numbered balls were drawn, with the results applied to all Groups 1–4, such that a seeded team numbered 1 to 4 would play an unseeded team numbered 5 to 8 in each tie, with the unseeded team to be the home team of the first leg.

Group 1		Group 2	
Seeded	Unseeded	Seeded	Unseeded
(France) Lyon (2) (Title holders); (Spain) Barcelona (3); (Denmark) Fortuna Hjørring (1); (Switzerland) Zürich (4)	(Austria) St. Pölten (5); (Italy) Juventus (7); (Netherlands) PSV (8); (Slovenia) Pomurje (6)	(Germany) VfL Wolfsburg (2); (Sweden) Rosengård (4); (Norway) LSK Kvinner (3); (Kazakhstan) BIIK Kazygurt (1)	(Belarus) FC Minsk (8); (Serbia) Spartak Subotica (7); (Ukraine) Zhytlobud-2 Kharkiv (6); (Georgia (country)) Lanchkhuti (5)
Group 3		Group 4	
Seeded	Unseeded	Seeded	Unseeded
(France) Paris Saint-Germain (3); (England) Manchester City (4); (Czech Republic) Slavia Prague (2); (Denmark) Brøndby (1)	(Italy) Fiorentina (7); (Sweden) Kopparbergs/Göteborg (5); (Norway) Vålerenga (6); (Poland) Górnik Łęczna (8)	(Germany) Bayern Munich (1); (England) Chelsea (2); (Spain) Atlético Madrid (3); (Scotland) Glasgow City (4)	(Czech Republic) Sparta Prague (5); (Netherlands) Ajax (6); (Switzerland) Servette Chênois (8); (Portugal) Benfica (7)

Notes

1. ^{Q} Winners of the second qualifying round.

=== Summary ===
The first legs were played on 9 and 10 December, and the second legs on 15, 16 and 17 December 2020. The tie between Vålerenga and Brøndby was played as a single-leg match in Brøndby on 11 February 2021 due to the quarantine restrictions imposed by the relevant Norwegian authorities in response to the COVID-19 pandemic in Norway.

Team 1	Agg.	Team 2	1st leg	2nd leg
St. Pölten (Austria)	3–0	(Switzerland) Zürich	2–0	1–0
Juventus (Italy)	2–6	(France) Lyon	2–3	0–3
Pomurje (Slovenia)	2–6	(Denmark) Fortuna Hjørring	0–3	2–3
PSV (Netherlands)	2–8	(Spain) Barcelona	1–4	1–4
Lanchkhuti (Georgia (country))	0–17	(Sweden) Rosengård	0–7	0–10
Spartak Subotica (Serbia)	0–7	(Germany) VfL Wolfsburg	0–5	0–2
Zhytlobud-2 Kharkiv (Ukraine)	2–2 (a)	(Kazakhstan) BIIK Kazygurt	2–1	0–1
FC Minsk (Belarus)	1–2	(Norway) LSK Kvinner	0–2	1–0
Kopparbergs/Göteborg (Sweden)	1–5	(England) Manchester City	1–2	0–3
Fiorentina (Italy)	3–2	(Czech Republic) Slavia Prague	2–2	1–0
Vålerenga (Norway)	1–1 (4–5 p)	(Denmark) Brøndby	—	1–1 (a.e.t.)
Górnik Łęczna (Poland)	1–8	(France) Paris Saint-Germain	0–2	1–6
Sparta Prague (Czech Republic)	3–1	(Scotland) Glasgow City	2–1	1–0
Benfica (Portugal)	0–8	(England) Chelsea	0–5	0–3
Ajax (Netherlands)	1–6	(Germany) Bayern Munich	1–3	0–3
Servette Chênois (Switzerland)	2–9	(Spain) Atlético Madrid	2–4	0–5

=== Matches ===
9 December 2020
17:00

St. Pölten (Austria)	2–0	(Switzerland) Zürich
Enzinger 71'; Zver 75'	Report

NV Arena, Sankt Pölten
Attendance: 0
Referee: Ivana Martinčić (Croatia)
17 December 2020
20:15

Zürich (Switzerland)	0–1	(Austria) St. Pölten
	Report	Makas 84'

Letzigrund, Zürich
Attendance: 0
Referee: Cheryl Foster (Wales)

St. Pölten won 3–0 on aggregate.

9 December 2020
15:00

Juventus (Italy)	2–3	(France) Lyon
Hurtig 16'; Buchanan 38' (o.g.)	Report	Renard 30' (pen.); Malard 68'; Kumagai 88'

Juventus Stadium, Turin
Attendance: 0
Referee: Riem Hussein (Germany)
15 December 2020
19:00

Lyon (France)	3–0	(Italy) Juventus
Marozsán 21'; Malard 88'; Cayman 90+1'	Report

Parc Olympique Lyonnais, Décines-Charpieu
Attendance: 0
Referee: Sara Persson (Sweden)

Lyon won 6–2 on aggregate.

9 December 2020
16:00

Pomurje (Slovenia)	0–3	(Denmark) Fortuna Hjørring
	Report	George 45+1', 48'; Holmgaard 59'

Stadion Gornja Radgona, Gornja Radgona
Attendance: 0
Referee: Ewa Augustyn (Poland)
16 December 2020
19:00

Fortuna Hjørring (Denmark)	3–2	(Slovenia) Pomurje
Snerle 45+1'; M. Carstens 80'; Andersen 81'	Report	Hofman 66'; Kolbl 90+3'

Hjørring Stadium, Hjørring
Attendance: 207
Referee: Iuliana Demetrescu (Romania)

Fortuna Hjørring won 6–2 on aggregate.

9 December 2020
16:30

PSV (Netherlands)	1–4	(Spain) Barcelona
Smits 89'	Report	Hermoso 4'; Van den Berg 45+1' (o.g.); Oshoala 66'; Martens 75'

De Herdgang, Eindhoven
Attendance: 0
Referee: Olga Zadinová (Czech Republic)
16 December 2020
17:00

Barcelona (Spain)	4–1	(Netherlands) PSV
Graham Hansen 4', 61'; Martens 41', 75'	Report	Smits 90'

Johan Cruyff Stadium, Sant Joan Despí
Attendance: 0
Referee: Ivana Projkovska (Macedonia)

Barcelona won 8–2 on aggregate.

9 December 2020
11:00 (14:00 GET)

Lanchkhuti (Georgia (country))	0–7	(Sweden) Rosengård
	Report	Čanković 7'; Rytting Kaneryd 18'; Anvegård 20'; Troelsgaard 26'; Bennison 28'; Viggósdóttir 32'; Seger 74'

Mikheil Meskhi Stadium-2, Tbilisi
Attendance: 0
Referee: Reelika Turi (Estonia)
16 December 2020
18:00

Rosengård (Sweden)	10–0	(Georgia (country)) Lanchkhuti
Troelsgaard 6', 56'; Čanković 14', 49', 57'; Anvegård 17', 68'; Rytting Kaneryd 30'; Bennison 32'; Seger 48'	Report

Malmö IP, Malmö
Attendance: 0
Referee: Shona Shukrula (Netherlands)

Rosengård won 17–0 on aggregate.

9 December 2020
15:00

Spartak Subotica (Serbia)	0–5	(Germany) VfL Wolfsburg
	Report	Jakabfi 4', 55'; Oberdorf 8'; Janssen 33'; Rauch 77'

Subotica City Stadium, Subotica
Attendance: 0
Referee: Melis Özçiğdem (Turkey)
16 December 2020
18:00

VfL Wolfsburg (Germany)	2–0	(Serbia) Spartak Subotica
Rolfö 66'; Van de Sanden 73'	Report

AOK Stadion, Wolfsburg
Attendance: 0
Referee: Petra Pavlíková (Slovakia)

VfL Wolfsburg won 7–0 on aggregate.

9 December 2020
12:00 (13:00 EET)

Zhytlobud-2 Kharkiv (Ukraine)	2–1	(Kazakhstan) BIIK Kazygurt
Filenko 30'; Andrukhiv 59'	Report	Babshuk 50'

Oleksiy Butovsky Vorskla Stadium, Poltava
Attendance: 0
Referee: Justina Lavrenovaite (Lithuania)
16 December 2020
07:00 (12:00 ALMT)

BIIK Kazygurt (Kazakhstan)	1–0	(Ukraine) Zhytlobud-2 Kharkiv
Kulmagambetova 35'	Report

Namyz Stadium, Shymkent
Attendance: 0
Referee: Hristiyana Guteva (Bulgaria)

Tied 2–2 on aggregate. BIIK Kazygurt won on away goals.

9 December 2020
12:00 (14:00 FET)

FC Minsk (Belarus)	0–2	(Norway) LSK Kvinner
	Report	Haavi 2'; Vanhaevermaet 56'

FC Minsk Stadium, Minsk
Attendance: 0
Referee: Sabina Bolić (Croatia)
16 December 2020
18:30

LSK Kvinner (Norway)	0–1	(Belarus) FC Minsk
	Report	Skorynina 72'

Åråsen Stadion, Lillestrøm
Attendance: 0
Referee: Maria Marotta (Italy)

LSK Kvinner won 2–1 on aggregate.

9 December 2020
16:00

Kopparbergs/Göteborg (Sweden)	1–2	(England) Manchester City
Bøe Risa 2'	Report	Stanway 41'; Mewis 76'

Valhalla IP, Gothenburg
Attendance: 0
Referee: Jana Adámková (Czech Republic)
16 December 2020
16:00 (15:00 GMT)

Manchester City (England)	3–0	(Sweden) Kopparbergs/Göteborg
Hemp 37'; Stanway 65', 68'	Report

Academy Stadium, Manchester
Attendance: 0
Referee: Katalin Kulcsár (Hungary)

Manchester City won 5–1 on aggregate.

10 December 2020
14:00

Fiorentina (Italy)	2–2	(Czech Republic) Slavia Prague
Quinn 4'; Sabatino 79'	Report	Persson 40'; Divišová 59'

Stadio Artemio Franchi, Florence
Attendance: 0
Referee: Rebecca Welch (England)
16 December 2020
14:00

Slavia Prague (Czech Republic)	0–1	(Italy) Fiorentina
	Report	Sabatino 90+5'

Sinobo Stadium, Prague
Attendance: 0
Referee: Tess Olofsson (Sweden)

Fiorentina won 3–2 on aggregate.

7 February 2021 (Note: The first leg between Vålerenga and Brøndby, originally scheduled for 10 December 2020, 18:00 CET, was postponed following a decision taken by the Norwegian local authorities to quarantine the Brøndby delegation due to a player testing positive for the COVID-19 virus. The second leg, originally scheduled for 16 December 2020, 18:00 CET, was also postponed due to another Brøndby player testing positive for the COVID-19 virus. The two matches were originally rescheduled for 7 and 14 February 2021. However, due to the quarantine restrictions imposed by the relevant Norwegian authorities and absence of exemptions for elite football, both Brøndby and Vålerenga agreed to play the tie as a single-leg match in Brøndby on 11 February 2021.)
15:00

Vålerenga (Norway)	Cancelled	(Denmark) Brøndby
	Report

Intility Arena, Oslo
11 February 2021
15:00

Brøndby (Denmark)	1–1 (a.e.t.)	(Norway) Vålerenga
Hasbo 78'	Report	Stefanović 16' (pen.)
Penalties
Nielsen (penalty scored); Hasbo (penalty scored); Christiansen (penalty scored); Gejl (penalty scored); Lamti (penalty scored)	5–4	(penalty scored) Sigurðardóttir; (penalty missed) Stefanović; (penalty scored) Thomsen; (penalty scored) Jensen; (penalty scored) Nygård

Brøndby Stadium, Brøndby
Attendance: 0
Referee: Katalin Kulcsár (Hungary)

10 December 2020
17:00

Górnik Łęczna (Poland)	0–2	(France) Paris Saint-Germain
	Report	Huitema 17'; Baltimore 25'

Stadion Miejski, Łęczna
Attendance: 0
Referee: Lorraine Watson (Scotland)
16 December 2020
15:00

Paris Saint-Germain (France)	6–1	(Poland) Górnik Łęczna
Nadim 21'; Huitema 24'; Paredes 32', 89'; Katoto 43'; Diani 51'	Report	Kamczyk 62'

Stade Municipal Georges Lefèvre, Saint-Germain-en-Laye
Attendance: 0
Referee: Jelena Pejković (Croatia)

Paris Saint-Germain won 8–1 on aggregate.

9 December 2020
15:00

Sparta Prague (Czech Republic)	2–1	(Scotland) Glasgow City
L. Martínková 34'; Dlasková 41'	Report	Wojcik 51'

Letní Stadion, Chomutov
Attendance: 0
Referee: Eszter Urban (Hungary)
16 December 2020
20:00 (19:00 GMT)

Glasgow City (Scotland)	0–1	(Czech Republic) Sparta Prague
	Report	L. Martínková 7'

Broadwood Stadium, Cumbernauld
Attendance: 0
Referee: Silvia Domingos (Portugal)

Sparta Prague won 3–1 on aggregate.

9 December 2020
16:00 (15:00 WET)

Benfica (Portugal)	0–5	(England) Chelsea
	Report	Kirby 2', 33'; Bright 29'; Harder 45'; England 54'

Benfica Campus, Seixal
Attendance: 0
Referee: Esther Staubli (Switzerland)
16 December 2020
20:00 (19:00 GMT)

Chelsea (England)	3–0	(Portugal) Benfica
England 28', 90+1'; Kerr 65'	Report

Kingsmeadow, Kingston upon Thames
Attendance: 0
Referee: Lina Lehtovaara (Finland)

Chelsea won 8–0 on aggregate.

10 December 2020
18:00

Ajax (Netherlands)	1–3	(Germany) Bayern Munich
Van de Velde 79'	Report	De Sanders 57' (o.g.); Lohmann 69'; Laudehr 86'

Sportpark De Toekomst, Duivendrecht
Attendance: 0
Referee: Pernilla Larsson (Sweden)
16 December 2020
18:00

Bayern Munich (Germany)	3–0	(Netherlands) Ajax
Beerensteyn 1'; Schüller 47'; Lohmann 69' (pen.)	Report

FC Bayern Campus, Munich
Attendance: 0
Referee: Anastasia Pustovoitova (Russia)

Bayern Munich won 6–1 on aggregate.

9 December 2020
18:00

Servette Chênois (Switzerland)	2–4	(Spain) Atlético Madrid
Serrano 18'; Lagonia 32' (pen.)	Report	Soulard 21' (o.g.); Ludmila 47'; Castellanos 55'; Laurent 90'

Stade de Genève, Geneva
Attendance: 0
Referee: Henrikke Nervik (Norway)
15 December 2020
20:30

Atlético Madrid (Spain)	5–0	(Switzerland) Servette Chênois
Santos 14'; Castellanos 45'; Tounkara 62'; Duggan 72'; Sampedro 90+3'	Report

Centro Deportivo Wanda Alcalá de Henares, Madrid
Attendance: 0
Referee: Frida Nielsen (Denmark)

Atlético Madrid won 9–2 on aggregate.

== Round of 16 ==
The draw for the round of 16 was held on 16 February 2021, 12:00 CET.

=== Seeding ===
The sixteen winners of the round of 32 were seeded based on their UEFA women's club coefficients (the title holders, should they qualify, were automatically seeded first). Prior to the draw, they were divided into two groups of eight teams, each containing four seeded teams and four unseeded teams, based on the restriction that teams from the same association could not be drawn against each other, and COVID-19 travel restrictions. A seeded team was drawn against an unseeded team, with the first team drawn of the two to be the home team of the first leg.

Group 1		Group 2	
Seeded	Unseeded	Seeded	Unseeded
(Germany) VfL Wolfsburg; (Spain) Barcelona; (Germany) Bayern Munich; (Sweden) Rosengård	(Denmark) Fortuna Hjørring; (Norway) LSK Kvinner; (Kazakhstan) BIIK Kazygurt; (Austria) St. Pölten	(France) Lyon; (France) Paris Saint-Germain; (England) Manchester City; (England) Chelsea	(Spain) Atlético Madrid; (Denmark) Brøndby; (Czech Republic) Sparta Prague; (Italy) Fiorentina

=== Summary ===
The first legs were played on 3, 4 and 9 March, and the second legs on 10, 11 and 17 March 2021.

Team 1	Agg.	Team 2	1st leg	2nd leg
VfL Wolfsburg (Germany)	4–0	(Norway) LSK Kvinner	2–0	2–0
Barcelona (Spain)	9–0	(Denmark) Fortuna Hjørring	4–0	5–0
Rosengård (Sweden)	4–2	(Austria) St. Pölten	2–2	2–0
BIIK Kazygurt (Kazakhstan)	1–9	(Germany) Bayern Munich	1–6	0–3
Manchester City (England)	8–0	(Italy) Fiorentina	3–0	5–0
Paris Saint-Germain (France)	5–3 (Note: Order of legs between Paris Saint-Germain and Sparta Prague reversed after original draw, due to quarantine of a large number of Sparta Prague players prior to the first leg.)	(Czech Republic) Sparta Prague	5–0	0–3 (awd.) (Note: The Sparta Prague v Paris Saint-Germain match could not be played due to quarantine of the Paris Saint-Germain players prior to the second leg. The match was awarded as a 3–0 win to Sparta Prague.)
Lyon (France)	5–1	(Denmark) Brøndby	2–0	3–1
Chelsea (England)	3–1	(Spain) Atlético Madrid	2–0	1–1

=== Matches ===
3 March 2021
18:15

VfL Wolfsburg (Germany)	2–0	(Norway) LSK Kvinner
Popp 2', 59'	Report

AOK Stadion, Wolfsburg
Attendance: 0
Referee: Désirée Grundbacher (Switzerland)
10 March 2021
14:00

LSK Kvinner (Norway)	0–2	(Germany) VfL Wolfsburg
	Report	Gausdal 43' (o.g.); Syrstad Engen 45'

Gyirmóti Stadion, Győr (Hungary) (Note: The second leg between LSK Kvinner and VfL Wolfsburg, originally to be played at Åråsen Stadion, Lillestrøm, was moved to Gyirmóti Stadion, Győr (Hungary), due to the quarantine restrictions in response to the COVID-19 pandemic in Norway.)
Attendance: 0
Referee: Sandra Bastos (Portugal)

VfL Wolfsburg won 4–0 on aggregate.

3 March 2021
16:45

Barcelona (Spain)	4–0	(Denmark) Fortuna Hjørring
Hermoso 12', 18', 57'; Putellas 82'	Report

Johan Cruyff Stadium, Sant Joan Despí
Attendance: 0
Referee: Shona Shukrula (Netherlands)
10 March 2021
15:55

Fortuna Hjørring (Denmark)	0–5	(Spain) Barcelona
	Report	Bonmatí 36', 49'; Caldentey 55' (pen.); Oshoala 79'; Torrejón 86'

Hjørring Stadium, Hjørring
Attendance: 0
Referee: Lorraine Watson (Scotland)

Barcelona won 9–0 on aggregate.

3 March 2021
18:00

Rosengård (Sweden)	2–2	(Austria) St. Pölten
Troelsgaard 68'; Seger 90+4'	Report	Zver 21', 46'

Malmö IP, Malmö
Attendance: 0
Referee: Riem Hussein (Germany)
10 March 2021
20:30

St. Pölten (Austria)	0–2	(Sweden) Rosengård
	Report	Seger 26'; Larsson 42'

NV Arena, Sankt Pölten
Attendance: 0
Referee: Anastasia Pustovoitova (Russia)

Rosengård won 4–2 on aggregate.

4 March 2021
07:00 (12:00 ALMT)

BIIK Kazygurt (Kazakhstan)	1–6	(Germany) Bayern Munich
Kundananji 81'	Report	Beerensteyn 10'; Schüller 27'; Dallmann 47', 90' (pen.); Glas 62'; Vilhjálmsdóttir 68'

Namyz Stadium, Shymkent
Attendance: 0
Referee: Kateryna Monzul (Ukraine)
10 March 2021
18:15

Bayern Munich (Germany)	3–0	(Kazakhstan) BIIK Kazygurt
Magull 2' (pen.); Boye Sørensen 35'; Lohmann 60' (pen.)	Report

FC Bayern Campus, Munich
Attendance: 0
Referee: Iuliana Demetrescu (Romania)

Bayern Munich won 9–1 on aggregate.

3 March 2021
17:45 (16:45 GMT)

Manchester City (England)	3–0	(Italy) Fiorentina
Hemp 2'; White 4'; Mewis 89'	Report

Academy Stadium, Manchester
Attendance: 0
Referee: Monika Mularczyk (Poland)
11 March 2021
14:00

Fiorentina (Italy)	0–5	(England) Manchester City
	Report	White 9', 32'; Weir 18' (pen.); Mewis 60', 79'

Stadio Artemio Franchi, Florence
Attendance: 0
Referee: Esther Staubli (Switzerland)

Manchester City won 8–0 on aggregate.

9 March 2021 (Note: Both legs between Paris Saint-Germain and Sparta Prague, originally to be played on 3 March 2021, 19:00 CET, at Letní Stadion, Chomutov, and 10 March 2021, 16:00 CET, at Stade Municipal Georges Lefèvre, Saint-Germain-en-Laye, were postponed due to quarantine of a large number of Sparta Prague players prior to the first leg. As a result, the tie was reversed, and the matches were rescheduled to be played on 9 March 2021, 16:00 CET, at Stade Municipal Georges Lefèvre, and 17 March 2021, 14:30 CET, at Letní Stadion.)
16:00

Paris Saint-Germain (France)	5–0	(Czech Republic) Sparta Prague
Katoto 29', 36'; Bachmann 55'; Lawrence 64'; Luana 79'	Report

Stade Municipal Georges Lefèvre, Saint-Germain-en-Laye
Attendance: 0
Referee: Frida Nielsen (Denmark)
17 March 2021
14:30

Sparta Prague (Czech Republic)	3–0 Awarded	(France) Paris Saint-Germain
	Report

Letní Stadion, Chomutov
Referee: Katalin Kulcsár (Hungary)

Paris Saint-Germain won 5–3 on aggregate.

4 March 2021
16:00

Lyon (France)	2–0	(Denmark) Brøndby
Parris 30'; Malard 90+3'	Report

Parc Olympique Lyonnais, Décines-Charpieu
Attendance: 0
Referee: Henrikke Nervik (Norway)
10 March 2021
13:55

Brøndby (Denmark)	1–3	(France) Lyon
Christiansen 11'	Report	Parris 32'; Malard 42'; Renard 50' (pen.)

Brøndby Stadium, Brøndby
Attendance: 0
Referee: Ivana Martinčić (Croatia)

Lyon won 5–1 on aggregate.

3 March 2021
20:00 (19:00 GMT)

Chelsea (England)	2–0	(Spain) Atlético Madrid
Mjelde 58' (pen.); Kirby 64'	Report

Kingsmeadow, Kingston upon Thames
Attendance: 0
Referee: Tess Olofsson (Sweden)
10 March 2021
13:30

Atlético Madrid (Spain)	1–1	(England) Chelsea
Laurent 90+3'	Report	Mjelde 77' (pen.)

Stadio Brianteo, Monza (Italy) (Note: The second leg between Atlético Madrid and Chelsea, originally to be played at Centro Deportivo Wanda Alcalá de Henares, Madrid, was moved to Stadio Brianteo, Monza (Italy), due to travel restrictions related to the COVID-19 pandemic from the United Kingdom to Spain.)
Attendance: 0
Referee: Stéphanie Frappart (France)

Chelsea won 3–1 on aggregate.

== Quarter-finals ==
The draw for the quarter-finals was held on 12 March 2021, 12:00 CET.

The eight winners of the round of 16, including the winner of the tie between Paris Saint-Germain and Sparta Prague whose identity was not known at the time of the draw, were drawn without any seeding or restrictions, with the first team drawn in each tie to be the home team of the first leg.

=== Summary ===
The first legs were played on 24 March, and the second legs on 31 March, 1 and 18 April 2021.

Team 1	Agg.	Team 2	1st leg	2nd leg
Bayern Munich (Germany)	4–0	(Sweden) Rosengård	3–0	1–0
Paris Saint-Germain (France)	2–2 (a)	(France) Lyon	0–1	2–1
Barcelona (Spain)	4–2	(England) Manchester City	3–0	1–2
Chelsea (England)	5–1	(Germany) VfL Wolfsburg	2–1	3–0

=== Matches ===
24 March 2021
19:00

Bayern Munich (Germany)	3–0	(Sweden) Rosengård
Dallmann 9'; Bühl 28'; Beerensteyn 65'	Report

FC Bayern Campus, Munich
Attendance: 0
Referee: Lina Lehtovaara (Finland)
1 April 2021
19:00

Rosengård (Sweden)	0–1	(Germany) Bayern Munich
	Report	Schüller 22'

Malmö IP, Malmö
Attendance: 0
Referee: Olga Zadinová (Czech Republic)

Bayern Munich won 4–0 on aggregate.

24 March 2021
18:00

Paris Saint-Germain (France)	0–1	(France) Lyon
	Report	Renard 86' (pen.)

Parc des Princes, Paris
Attendance: 0
Referee: Esther Staubli (Switzerland)
18 April 2021 (Note: The second leg between Lyon and Paris Saint-Germain, originally to be played on 1 April 2021, 18:30 CEST, at Parc Olympique Lyonnais, Décines-Charpieu, was postponed due to positive COVID-19 tests by Lyon players. The match was rescheduled to be played on 18 April 2021, 14:00 CEST.)
14:00

Lyon (France)	1–2	(France) Paris Saint-Germain
Macario 4'	Report	Geyoro 25'; Renard 61' (o.g.)

Parc Olympique Lyonnais, Décines-Charpieu
Attendance: 0
Referee: Ivana Martinčić (Croatia)

2–2 on aggregate. Paris Saint-Germain won on away goals.

24 March 2021
12:30

Barcelona (Spain)	3–0	(England) Manchester City
Oshoala 35'; Caldentey 53' (pen.); Hermoso 86'	Report

Stadio Brianteo, Monza (Italy) (Note: The first leg between Barcelona and Manchester City was moved to Stadio Brianteo, Monza (Italy), due to travel restrictions related to the COVID-19 pandemic from the United Kingdom to Spain.)
Attendance: 0
Referee: Tess Olofsson (Sweden)
31 March 2021
17:00 (16:00 BST)

Manchester City (England)	2–1	(Spain) Barcelona
Beckie 20'; Mewis 68' (pen.)	Report	Oshoala 59'

Academy Stadium, Manchester
Attendance: 0
Referee: Monika Mularczyk (Poland)

Barcelona won 4–2 on aggregate.

24 March 2021
17:00

Chelsea (England)	2–1	(Germany) VfL Wolfsburg
Kerr 55'; Harder 66'	Report	Janssen 70' (pen.)

Szusza Ferenc Stadion, Budapest (Hungary) (Note: Both legs between Chelsea and VfL Wolfsburg were moved to Szusza Ferenc Stadion, Budapest (Hungary), due to travel restrictions related to the COVID-19 pandemic between Germany and the United Kingdom.)
Attendance: 0
Referee: Jana Adámková (Czech Republic)
31 March 2021
14:00

VfL Wolfsburg (Germany)	0–3	(England) Chelsea
	Report	Harder 27' (pen.); Kerr 32'; Kirby 81'

Szusza Ferenc Stadion, Budapest (Hungary)
Attendance: 0
Referee: Anastasia Pustovoitova (Russia)

Chelsea won 5–1 on aggregate.

== Semi-finals ==
The draw for the semi-finals was held on 12 March 2021, 12:00 CET (after the quarter-final draw).

The four quarter-final winners, whose identity was not known at the time of the draw, were drawn without any seeding or restrictions, with the first team drawn in each tie to be the home team of the first leg.

=== Summary ===
The first legs were played on 25 April and the second legs on 2 May 2021.

Team 1	Agg.	Team 2	1st leg	2nd leg
Paris Saint-Germain (France)	2–3	(Spain) Barcelona	1–1	1–2
Bayern Munich (Germany)	3–5	(England) Chelsea	2–1	1–4

=== Matches ===
25 April 2021
15:00

Paris Saint-Germain (France)	1–1	(Spain) Barcelona
Cook 21'	Report	Hermoso 13'

Stade Municipal Georges Lefèvre, Paris
Attendance: 0
Referee: Olga Zadinová (Czech Republic)
2 May 2021
12:00

Barcelona (Spain)	2–1	(France) Paris Saint-Germain
Martens 8', 31'	Report	Katoto 34'

Johan Cruyff Stadium, Sant Joan Despí
Attendance: 981
Referee: Anastasia Pustovoitova (Russia)

Barcelona won 3–2 on aggregate.

25 April 2021
17:00

Bayern Munich (Germany)	2–1	(England) Chelsea
Lohmann 12'; Glas 56'	Report	Leupolz 23'

FC Bayern Campus, Munich
Attendance: 0
Referee: Sara Persson (Sweden)
2 May 2021
13:30 (12:30 BST)

Chelsea (England)	4–1	(Germany) Bayern Munich
Kirby 11', 90+5'; Ji 43'; Harder 84'	Report	Zadrazil 29'

Kingsmeadow, Kingston upon Thames
Attendance: 0
Referee: Esther Staubli (Switzerland)

Chelsea won 5–3 on aggregate.

== Final ==
The final was played on 16 May 2021 at Gamla Ullevi, Gothenburg. A draw was held on 12 March 2021, 12:00 CET (after the quarter-final and semi-final draws), to determine which semi-final winner would be designated as the "home" team for administrative purposes.

16 May 2021
21:00

Chelsea (England)	0–4	(Spain) Barcelona
	Report	Leupolz 1' (o.g.); Putellas 14' (pen.); Bonmatí 21'; Hansen 36'

Gamla Ullevi, Gothenburg
Attendance: 0 (Note: The final was played behind closed doors due to the COVID-19 pandemic in Sweden.)
Referee: Riem Hussein (Germany)
