= 2020 Women's FA Community Shield =

Football match

| Chelsea | Manchester City |
| 2 | 0 |
- Date: 29 August 2020
- Venue: Wembley Stadium, London
- Player of the Match: Ji So-yun (Chelsea)
- Referee: Rebecca Welch (Durham)
- Attendance: 0 (Note: The match was played behind closed doors due to the COVID-19 pandemic in the United Kingdom.)

The 2020 Women's FA Community Shield was the ninth Women's FA Community Shield, and the first after the competition's revival following an eleven-season abeyance. As with its male equivalent, the Community Shield is an annual football match played between the winners of the previous season's league and the previous season's Women's FA Cup. However, as the 2019–20 Women's FA Cup was postponed due to the COVID-19 pandemic in the United Kingdom, the 2020 Community Shield was contested by the 2019–20 FA WSL champions Chelsea and the still-reigning 2018–19 FA Cup winners, Manchester City. Both teams were contesting their first ever Women's Community Shield.

The match was played as part of a double-header, with both the women's and men's Community Shields contested on the same day, played back-to-back at Wembley Stadium and was televised live on BBC One and BBC iPlayer.

== Match ==
=== Details ===
29 August 2020
12:30 BST (UTC+1)

| Chelsea | 2–0 | Manchester City |
|---|---|---|
| Bright 66'; Cuthbert 90+1' | Report |

Wembley Stadium, London
Attendance: 0
Referee: Rebecca Welch (Durham)

| Chelsea | Manchester City |

| GK | 30 | (Germany) Ann-Katrin Berger |
| DF | 18 | (Norway) Maren Mjelde |
| DF | 4 | (England) Millie Bright |
| DF | 16 | (Sweden) Magdalena Eriksson (c) |
| DF | 25 | (Sweden) Jonna Andersson | (substituted off) 90+4' |
| MF | 8 | (Germany) Melanie Leupolz |
| MF | 5 | (Wales) Sophie Ingle |
| MF | 10 | (South Korea) Ji So-yun |
| FW | 14 | (England) Fran Kirby | (substituted off) 71' |
| FW | 20 | (Australia) Sam Kerr | (substituted off) 72' |
| FW | 11 | (Norway) Guro Reiten | (substituted off) 88' |
Substitutes:
| GK | 28 | (England) Carly Telford |
| DF | 2 | (Norway) Maria Thorisdottir |
| DF | 3 | (England) Hannah Blundell |
| MF | 7 | (England) Jessica Carter |
| FW | 9 | Bethany England | (substituted on) 72' |
| MF | 17 | (Canada) Jessie Fleming | (substituted on) 90+4' |
| FW | 21 | (England) Niamh Charles | (substituted on) 88' |
| MF | 22 | (Scotland) Erin Cuthbert | (substituted on) 71' |
| MF | 24 | (England) Drew Spence |
Manager:
(England) Emma Hayes

| GK | 26 | (England) Ellie Roebuck |
| DF | 14 | (England) Esme Morgan |
| DF | 6 | (England) Steph Houghton (c) |
| DF | 4 | (England) Gemma Bonner |
| DF | 3 | (England) Demi Stokes |
| MF | 24 | (England) Keira Walsh |
| MF | 19 | (Scotland) Caroline Weir | | (substituted off) 68' |
| MF | 8 | (England) Jill Scott | (yellow card) 32' (yellow-red card) 62' |
| FW | 15 | (England) Lauren Hemp | | (substituted off) 26' |
| FW | 9 | (England) Chloe Kelly |
| FW | 10 | (England) Georgia Stanway | | (substituted off) 83' |
Substitutes:
| GK | 1 | (England) Karen Bardsley |
| GK | 34 | (France) Karima Benameur Taieb |
| DF | 5 | (Republic of Ireland) Megan Campbell |
| MF | 7 | (England) Laura Coombs |
| FW | 11 | (Canada) Janine Beckie | | (substituted on) 26' |
| FW | 16 | (England) Jess Park |
| FW | 18 | (England) Ellen White | | (substituted on) 83' |
| MF | 22 | (United States) Sam Mewis | | (substituted on) 68' |
Manager:
(Wales) Gareth Taylor

Player of the match

- Ji So-yun (Chelsea)

Match officials

- Assistant referees:
  - Natalie Aspinall (Lancashire)
  - Emily Carney (Lancashire)
- Fourth official: Abigail Byrne (Suffolk)

Match rules

- 90 minutes.
- Penalty shoot-out if scores are level.
- Nine named substitutes.
- Maximum of five substitutions in three stoppages.
