= Jess Carter =

English footballer (born 1997)

Jess Carter MBE
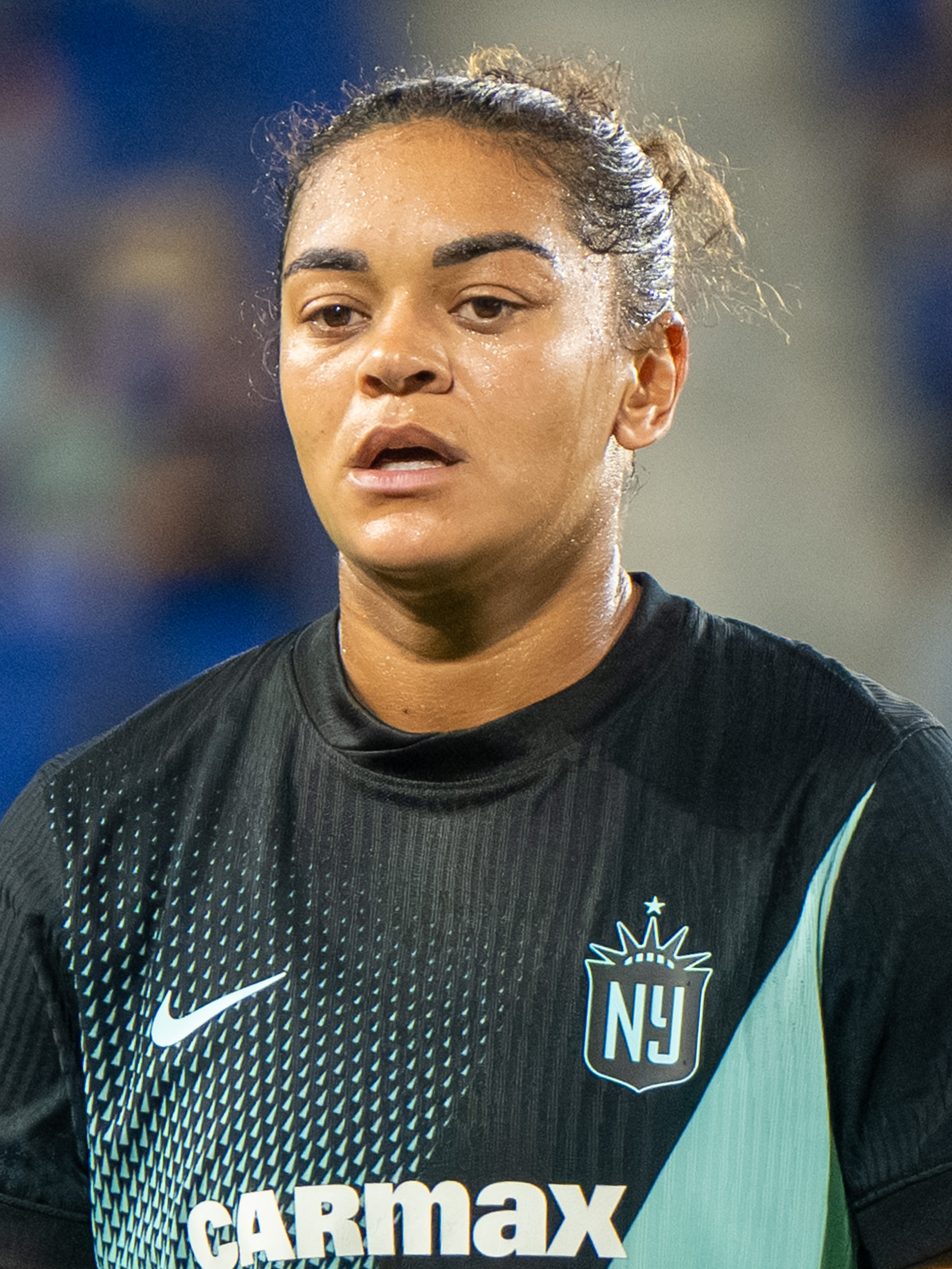
- Carter with Gotham FC in 2025

Personal information
- Full name: Jessica Leigh Carter
- Date of birth: 27 October 1997 (age 29)
- Place of birth: Warwick, England
- Height: 5 ft 5 in (1.65 m)
- Position: Centre-back

Team information
- Current team: Bay FC
- Number: 4

Youth career
- 2004–2013: Warwick Junior
- 2013: Birmingham City

Senior career*
Years	Team	Apps	(Gls)
2013–2018	Birmingham City	67	(1)
2018–2024	Chelsea	89	(3)
2024–2026	Gotham FC	63	(0)
2027–	Bay FC	0	(0)

International career^{‡}
2014	England U19	3	(1)
2016	England U20	3	(0)
2016–2019	England U21	5	(1)
2019	England U23	1	(0)
2017–	England	56	(3)
Medal record
Women's football
Representing England
UEFA Women's Championship
Winner	2022 England
Winner	2025 Switzerland
UEFA–CONMEBOL Finalissima
Winner	2023 England
FIFA Women's World Cup
Runner-up	2023 Australia and New Zealand
- * Club domestic league appearances and goals as of 1 November 2026 ‡ National team caps and goals as of 23:50, 13 October 2026 (UTC)

Jessica Leigh Carter MBE (born 27 October 1997) is an English professional footballer who plays as a centre-back for Bay FC of the National Women's Soccer League (NWSL) and the England national team.

Carter began her senior career at Birmingham City and was awarded PFA Young Player of the Year and named in the PFA WSL Team of the Year in 2017. She joined Chelsea in 2018, winning five Women's Super League titles, three FA Cups, and other titles over six seasons. She then joined Gotham FC in 2024, winning the NWSL Championship and NWSL Shield over three seasons.

Carter made her senior debut for England in 2017. She was part of England squads that won two European Championships and the Finalissima and were World Cup runners-up.

== Early life ==
Carter was born in England to an African American father and British mother, and holds both British and American citizenship. As a youth, Carter captained the Warwick Juniors to the County Cup championship; a plaque honouring Carter was installed at the club in 2022 as part of the "Where Greatness Is Made" campaign.

== Club career ==
=== Birmingham City ===
In June 2013, Carter joined the Birmingham City Academy. In March 2014 at the age of 16, she made her debut for Birmingham City in a match against Arsenal in the first leg of the 2013–14 UEFA Women's Champions League quarter-final. She was subsequently named player of the match.

=== Chelsea ===
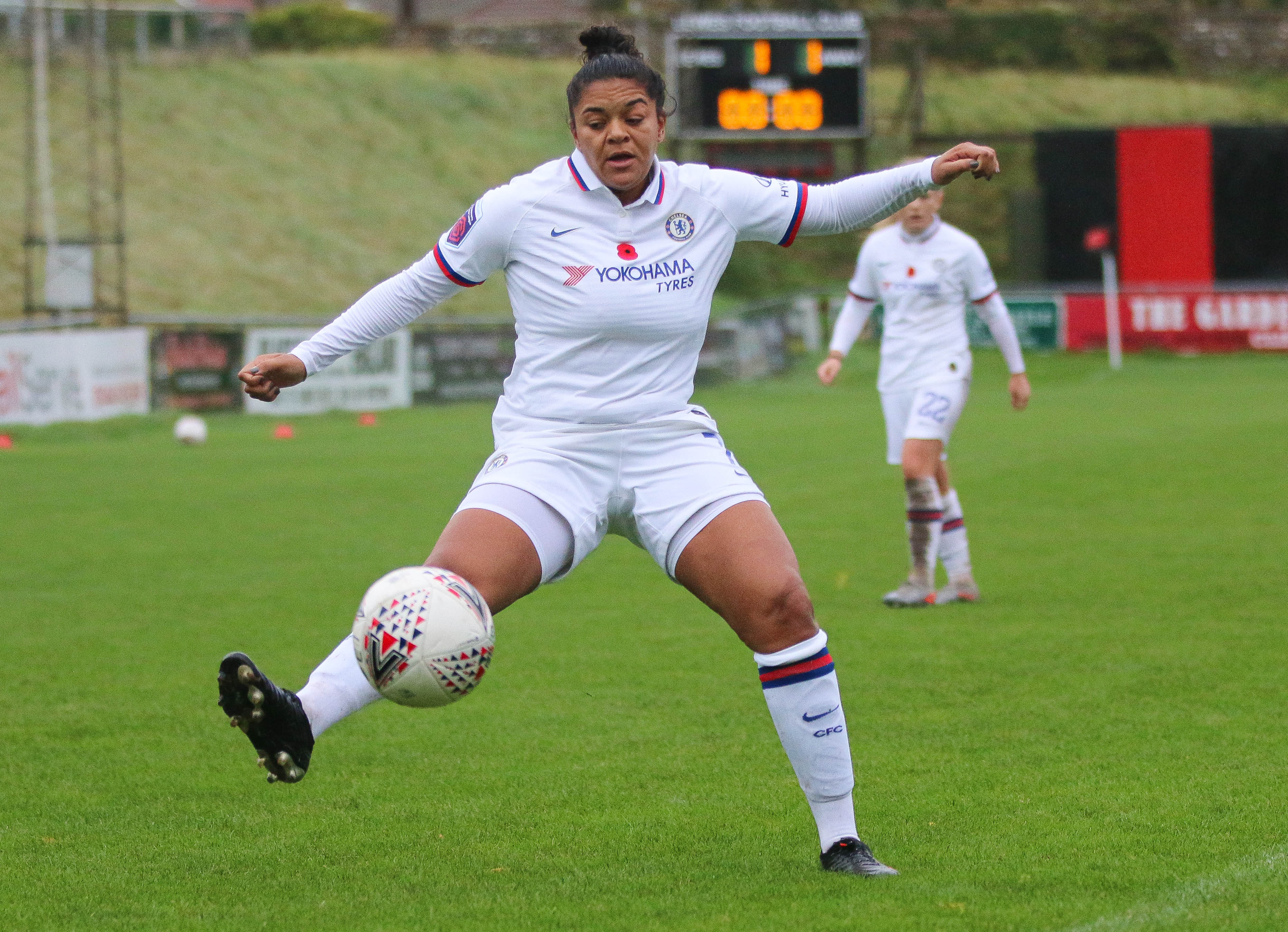
Carter playing for Chelsea against Lewes, November 2019.

In June 2018, Carter joined Chelsea on a three-year contract from Birmingham City. In the 2018–19 season she made only 16 starts in games, six of which came from the League Cup.

Sports writer Jonathan Liew described it as a difficult patch in her early career, where she would be frequently late for training and miss fitness targets. According to Liew, she was put on a personalised diet and received "a certain micromanagement" by Chelsea staff, in order to get back her career on track. Carter has credited manager Emma Hayes with her development both on and off the pitch.

In January 2020, in the 2019–20 season, Carter scored her debut goal for the club in a 6–1 win over Bristol City. On 2 May 2021, Carter helped Chelsea reach the Champions League final, taking the free-kick that Pernille Harder would score from, to put the team ahead (on aggregate) in the 2nd leg of the 2020–21 Champions League semi final. She featured in the final two weeks later as right-back, where she struggled against Barcelona's exceptional wide-play, resulting in a 4–0 defeat. Carter nonetheless ended the 2020–21 season as a domestic treble winner with Chelsea.

Carter had her career breakthrough during the 2021–22 season, forming the key part of the defensive back three with teammates Millie Bright and Magdalena Eriksson.

In October 2022, Carter extended her Chelsea contract to remain at the club as a defender until 2025. On 23 November 2022, Carter made her 100th appearance for the club against Real Madrid.

=== Gotham FC ===
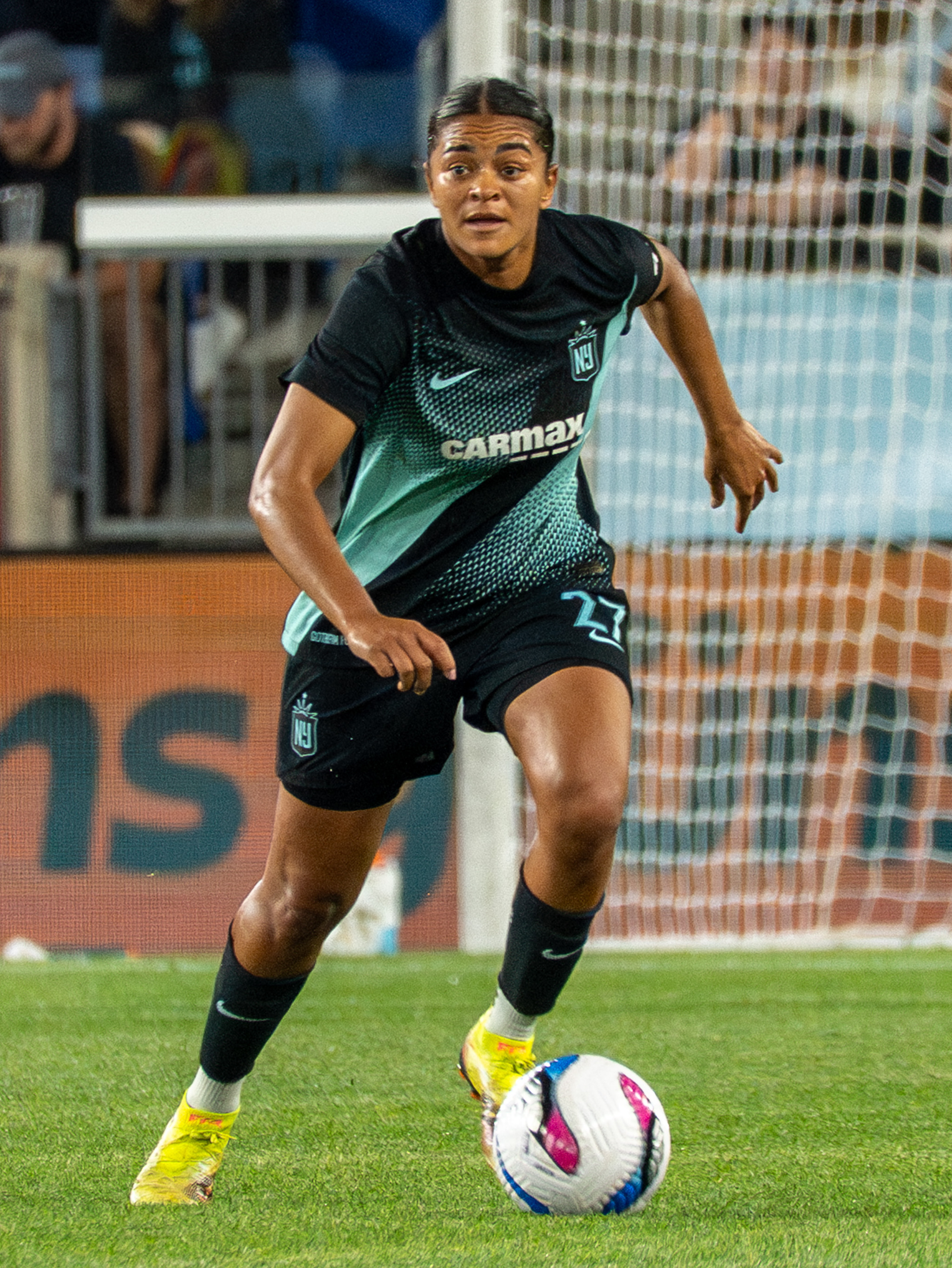
Jess Carter with Gotham FC in 2025

On 29 July 2024, NJ/NY Gotham FC announced that they had signed Carter until 2026.

On 25 May 2025, she started in the 2025 CONCACAF W Champions Cup final against Tigres, where Gotham won 1–0 to become the inaugural winners of the competition. On 22 November, she won the NWSL Championship with Gotham.

After Gotham's opening four in the 2026 season, Carter received her first NWSL Team of the Month honor after helping her team keep three clean sheets in that timespan.

=== Bay FC ===
On 18 November 2026, the NWSL's Bay FC announced the signing of Carter on a two-year contract.

== International career ==
=== Youth ===
Carter has represented England in the U19, U20, U21 and U23 youth teams.

In January 2014, during her debut for the England under-19 team, she scored against Norway. In April, Carter played as a forward in the 2014 U-19 Championship qualification matches against Denmark and Finland, with England qualifying for the final tournament. On 18 June 2014, she featured in the under-23 squad in the Nordic Tournament, losing 3–0 to Norway. In July, Carter was named as part of the under-20 squad for the 2014 FIFA U-20 Women's World Cup, as a forward player.

After her senior international debut in 2017, Carter was named in the under-21 squad as a defender for La Manga Tournament. In April 2019, she featured as part of the starting eleven in England's 2–1 victory over France, followed by being sent off for a second bookable offence in a loss to Norway.

=== Senior ===
In April 2017, after her earlier role as striker in England's youth teams, Carter received her first call up to the senior team, as a defender, for fixtures against Italy and Austria. On 28 November 2017, she made her senior international debut in 2019 World Cup qualification against Kazakhstan, replacing Lucy Bronze in the 77th minute as England won 5–0.

In June 2022, after not playing for the senior team from 2017 to 2021, Carter was part the England squad which won the UEFA Women's Euro 2022, playing a total of 16 minutes in the tournament. In November 2022, Carter was allotted 201 in the FA legacy numbers scheme.

In May 2023, Carter was named to the squad for the 2023 FIFA Women's World Cup. She started in five of six matches in the tournament, as an integral part of England's back three, credited with ensuring the team only conceded three goals up until the final. In the final and playing as a right-back, where England lost 1–0 to Spain, Carter was ranked second best player for England by BBC Sport, after goalkeeper Mary Earps.

In June 2025, Carter was named to the England squad for the UEFA Women's Euro 2025. During the tournament, she was subjected to racist abuse on social media, prompting police involvement. Carter subsequently announced that she would step back from managing her social media accounts to safeguard her mental health and concentrate on supporting the team. She returned to the starting eleven for the final, helping England secure a victory over Spain on penalties to claim their second European title. A 59-year-old man was later arrested on suspicion of malicious communications in connection with the abuse and released under investigation. In March 2026, the man was sentenced to six weeks in prison, with the sentence suspended for a year, as well as a four-year football banning order by District Judge Tony Watkin of the Blackburn Magistrates' Court.

== Style of play ==
Carter has been described by Jonathan Liew as calm in possession, relatively error-free, and with "exceptional read of the game". According to The Independent, she is "one of the best one-on-one defenders in the Women's Super League".

Early in her career from 2013 to 2018, Carter begun as a defender and midfielder for Birmingham City, and in 2014, she played as a forward with England under-19s and under-20s. With Chelsea, she started as a full-back in 2018 before becoming a centre-back. A right footed and versatile defender, Carter has played both left-back and right-back for England and Chelsea, but prefers not to play on the left. She believes her skills are best used as part of a back-three formation.

Carter has identified her pace and ability to read the game as key strengths in her defensive play, stating in February 2024 that these attributes are her "super strength."

== Personal life ==
Since 2017, Carter has been in a relationship with fellow professional footballer Ann-Katrin Berger. In May 2024, they announced their engagement.

Carter is the Co-Founder and an ambassador for an all-female football academy run by former Barcelona & Arsenal youth player, Judan Ali.

She also has a train named after her in England.

== Career statistics ==
=== Club ===
As of match played 15 November 2026

Appearances and goals by club, player season and competition
Club	Season	League			National Cup (Note: Includes the FA Cup, NWSL Challenge Cup)		League Cup (Note: Includes the WSL Cup, NWSL Playoffs)		Continental (Note: Includes the UEFA Women's Champions League, CONCACAF W Champions Cup)		Other		Total	
Club	Season	Division	Apps	Goals	Apps	Goals	Apps	Goals	Apps	Goals	Apps	Goals	Apps	Goals
Birmingham City	2014	WSL 1	12	0	2	0	2	0	4	0	—		20	0
Birmingham City	2015	WSL 1	14	0	2	0	7	0	—		—		23	0
Birmingham City	2016	WSL 1	16	0	1	0	4	0	—		—		21	0
Birmingham City	2017	WSL 1	7	0	0	0	—		—		—		7	0
Birmingham City	2017–18	WSL 1	18	1	2	0	3	0	—		—		23	1
Birmingham City	Total		67	1	7	0	16	0	4	0	—		94	1
Chelsea	2018–19	WSL	13	0	2	0	6	0	3	0	—		24	0
Chelsea	2019–20	WSL	8	1	2	0	5	0	–		—		15	1
Chelsea	2020–21	WSL	9	0	0	0	1	0	6	0	—		16	0
Chelsea	2021–22	WSL	21	0	4	0	3	1	5	0	—		33	1
Chelsea	2022–23	WSL	17	2	5	1	1	0	8	0	—		31	3
Chelsea	2023–24	WSL	21	0	4	0	2	0	9	0	—		36	0
Chelsea	Total		89	3	17	1	18	1	31	0	—		155	5
Gotham FC	2024	NWSL	10	0	—		2	0	2	0	2 (Note: Appearances in the NWSL x Liga MX Femenil Summer Cup)	0	16	0
Gotham FC	2025	NWSL	23	0	—		3	0	5 (Note: Two appearances in the 2024–25 tournament, three appearances in the 2025–26 tournament)	0	—		31	0
Gotham FC	2026	NWSL	30	0	1	0	2	0	2	0	1 (Note: Appearance in the FIFA Women's Champions Cup)	0	36	0
Gotham FC	Total		63	0	1	0	7	0	9	0	3	0	83	0
Career total			219	4	25	1	41	1	44	0	3	0	332	6

=== International ===
Statistics accurate as of match played 13 October 2026.

Appearances and goals by national team and year
National Team	Year	Apps	Goals
England	2017	1	0
England	2021	2	1
England	2022	9	0
England	2023	16	0
England	2024	11	1
England	2025	13	0
England	2026	4	1
Total		56	3

Scores and results list England's goal tally first, score column indicates score after each Carter goal.

List of international goals scored by Jess Carter
No.	Date	Venue	Opponent	Score	Result	Competition	Ref.
1	30 November 2021	Keepmoat Stadium, Doncaster, England	Latvia	10–0	20–0	2023 FIFA Women's World Cup qualification	
2	23 February 2024	Estadio Nuevo Mirador, Algeciras, Spain	Austria	5–1	7–2	Friendly	
3	9 June 2026	Hill Dickinson Stadium, Liverpool, England	Ukraine	1–0	3–0	2027 FIFA Women's World Cup qualification	

== Honours ==
Chelsea

- FA Women's Super League: 2019–20, 2020–21, 2021–22, 2022–23, 2023–24
- FA Community Shield: 2020
- Women's FA Cup: 2020–21, 2021–22, 2022–23
- FA Women's League Cup: 2019–20, 2020–21
- UEFA Women's Champions League runner-up: 2020–21

Gotham FC

- NWSL Championship: 2025
- NWSL Shield: 2026
- NWSL Challenge Cup: 2026
- CONCACAF W Champions Cup: 2024–25
- FIFA Women's Champions Cup third place: 2026

England

- FIFA Women's World Cup runner-up: 2023
- UEFA Women's Championship: 2022, 2025
- Women's Finalissima: 2023
- Arnold Clark Cup: 2022, 2023

Individual

- FA WSL PFA Team of the Year: 2017
- PFA Young Player of the Year: 2016–17
- Freedom of the City of London (announced 1 August 2022)
- PFA Community Champion Award: 2022–23
- Chelsea Women's Player's Player of the Year: 2023–24
- UEFA Women's Champions League Team of the Season: 2023–24
- PFA Special Recognition Award: 2025
- Key to the City of New York
- The Guardian Footballer of the Year: 2025
- Member of the Order of the British Empire: 2026
