= 2021 UEFA Women's Champions League final =

2021 UEFA Women's Champions League Final
- Match programme cover
- Event: 2020–21 UEFA Women's Champions League
Chelsea	Barcelona
(England)	(Spain)
0	4
- Date: 16 May 2021
- Venue: Gamla Ullevi, Gothenburg
- Player of the Match: Aitana Bonmatí (Barcelona)
- Referee: Riem Hussein (Germany)
- Attendance: 0 (Note: The final was played behind closed doors due to the COVID-19 pandemic in Sweden.)
- Weather: Cloudy night 12 °C (54 °F); 87% humidity

The 2021 UEFA Women's Champions League Final was the final match of the 2020–21 UEFA Women's Champions League, the 20th season of Europe's premier women's club football tournament organised by UEFA, and the 12th season since it was renamed from the UEFA Women's Cup to the UEFA Women's Champions League. It was played at Gamla Ullevi in Gothenburg, Sweden on 16 May 2021, between English club Chelsea and Spanish club Barcelona. Due to local restrictions in Sweden caused by the COVID-19 pandemic, the match was played behind closed doors. By advancing to the final, Chelsea became the first club to see its men's and women's teams reach the Champions League final in the same season, having also qualified for the UEFA Champions League final.

Barcelona won the match 4–0 for their first Champions League title. In doing so, they became the first club to have won both men's and women's UEFA Champions League titles – its men's team won the Champions League five times; it was a record Chelsea was also seeking. It was also the largest margin of victory in any single-legged UEFA Women's Champions League Final.

== Teams ==
In the following table, finals until 2009 were in the UEFA Women's Cup era, since 2010 were in the UEFA Women's Champions League era.

Team	Previous finals appearances (bold indicates winners)
(England) Chelsea	None
(Spain) Barcelona	1 (2019)

== Venue ==
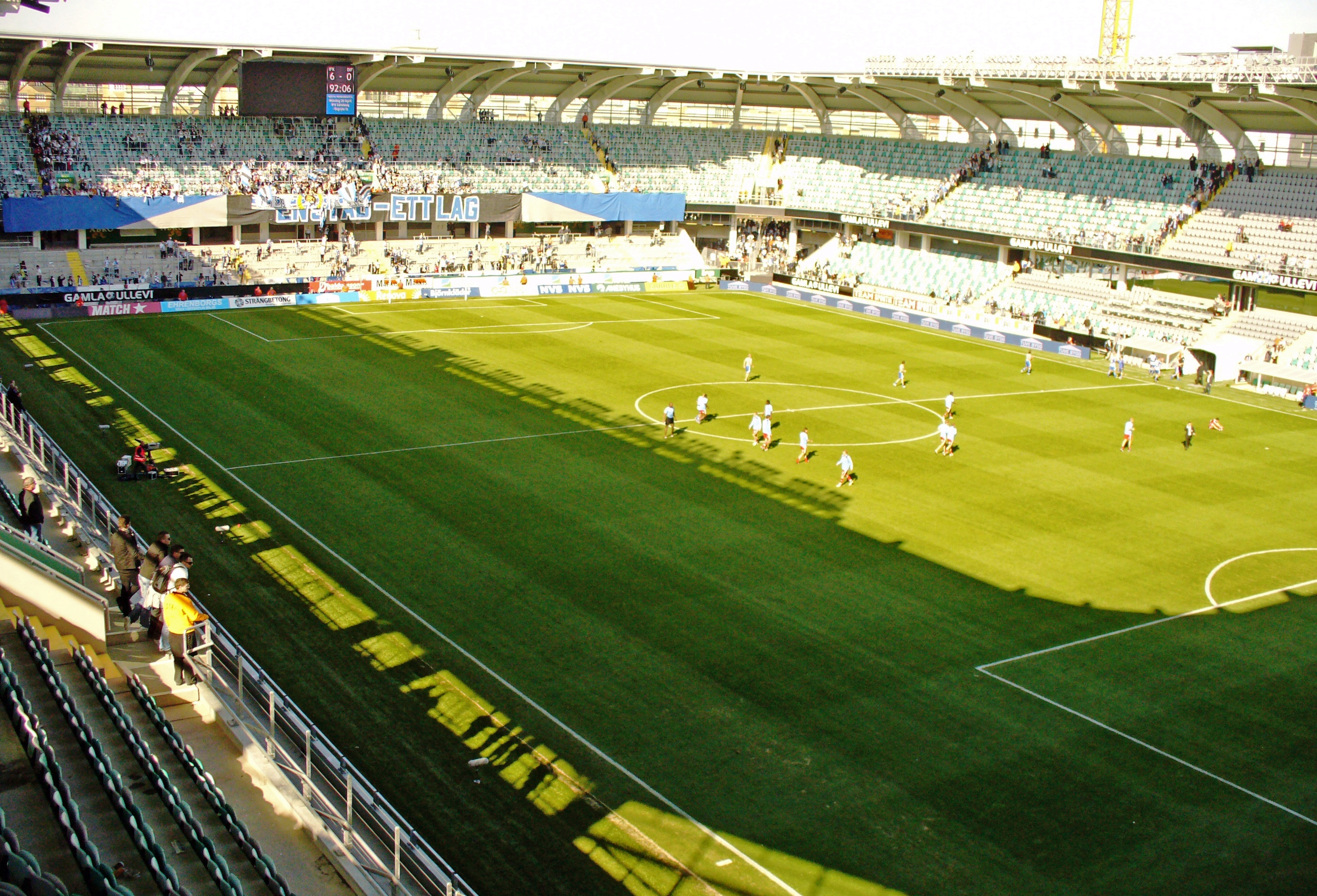
Gamla Ullevi in Gothenburg hosted the final.

This was the first UEFA club competition final hosted at Gamla Ullevi, and the first hosted in the city of Gothenburg since the 2004 UEFA Cup Final at the Nya Ullevi. The stadium previously hosted matches at UEFA Women's Euro 2013 and the 2009 UEFA European Under-21 Championship.

=== Host selection ===
An open bidding process was launched on 28 September 2018 by UEFA to select the venues of the finals of the UEFA Champions League, UEFA Europa League, and UEFA Women's Champions League in 2021. Associations had until 26 October 2018 to express interest, and bid dossiers must be submitted by 15 February 2019.

UEFA announced on 1 November 2018 that two associations had expressed interest in hosting the 2021 UEFA Women's Champions League final. and on 22 February 2019 that one association submitted their dossier by the deadline.

Bidding associations for 2021 UEFA Women's Champions League Final
Association	Stadium	City	Capacity
Sweden	Gamla Ullevi	Gothenburg	16,600

The Czech Football Association expressed interest in nominating Sinobo Stadium in Prague but eventually did not submit a bid.

Gamla Ullevi was selected by the UEFA Executive Committee during their meeting in Baku, Azerbaijan on 29 May 2019.

== Route to the final ==
Note: In all results below, the score of the finalist is given first (H: home; A: away).

(England) Chelsea				Round	(Spain) Barcelona			
Opponent	Agg.	1st leg	2nd leg	Knockout phase	Opponent	Agg.	1st leg	2nd leg
(Portugal) Benfica	8–0	5–0 (A)	3–0 (H)	Round of 32	(Netherlands) PSV	8–2	4–1 (A)	4–1 (H)
(Spain) Atlético Madrid	3–1	2–0 (H)	1–1 (A) (Note: The round of 16 second leg, in which Atlético Madrid were the administrative home team, was played at a neutral venue in Monza, Italy, due to travel restrictions related to the COVID-19 pandemic from the United Kingdom to Spain.)	Round of 16	(Denmark) Fortuna Hjørring	9–0	4–0 (H)	5–0 (A)
(Germany) VfL Wolfsburg	5–1	2–1 (H) (Note: Both legs of Chelsea's quarter-final against VfL Wolfsburg were played in Budapest due to travel restrictions related to the COVID-19 pandemic between Germany and the United Kingdom.)	3–0 (A)	Quarter-finals	(England) Manchester City	4–2	3–0 (H) (Note: The quarter-final first leg, in which Barcelona were the administrative home team, was played at a neutral venue in Monza, Italy, due to travel restrictions related to the COVID-19 pandemic from the United Kingdom to Spain.)	1–2 (A)
(Germany) Bayern Munich	5–3	1–2 (A)	4–1 (H)	Semi-finals	(France) Paris Saint-Germain	3–2	1–1 (A)	2–1 (H)

== Pre-match ==
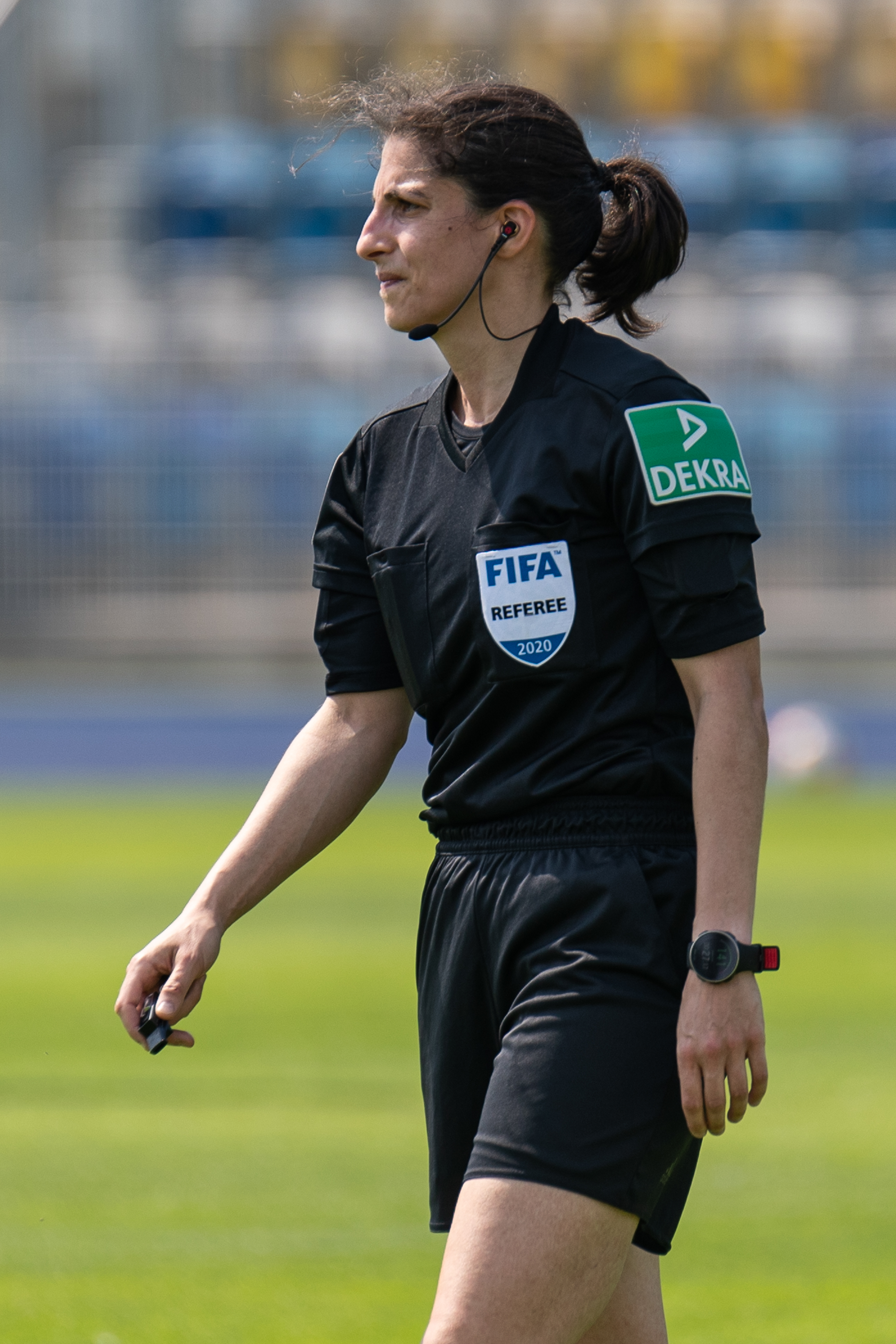
German referee Riem Hussein officiated the final.

=== Officials ===
On 4 May 2021, UEFA named German official Riem Hussein as the referee for the final. Hussein had been a FIFA referee since 2009, and previously officiated at UEFA Women's Euro 2017 and the 2019 FIFA Women's World Cup. She was joined by her compatriot Katrin Rafalski and Sara Telek of Austria as assistant referees. Katalin Kulcsár of Hungary served as the fourth official, while Julia Magnusson of Sweden was the reserve assistant referee. Hussein's fellow countrymen Bastian Dankert and Christian Dingert worked as the video assistant referee and assistant VAR officials, respectively.

== Match ==
=== Details ===
A draw was held on 12 March 2021, 12:00 CET (after the quarter-final and semi-final draws), at the UEFA headquarters in Nyon, Switzerland to determine which semi-final winner would be designated as the "home" team for administrative purposes.

16 May 2021
21:00 UTC+2

Chelsea (England)	0–4	(Spain) Barcelona
	Report	Leupolz 1' (o.g.); Putellas 14' (pen.); Bonmatí 21'; Hansen 36'

Gamla Ullevi, Gothenburg
Attendance: 0
Referee: Riem Hussein (Germany)

**Chelsea**	**Barcelona**

GK	30	(Germany) Ann-Katrin Berger
RB	7	(England) Jessica Carter
CB	4	(England) Millie Bright
CB	16	(Sweden) Magdalena Eriksson (c)
LB	21	(England) Niamh Charles
RM	8	(Germany) Melanie Leupolz		(substituted off) 46'
CM	5	(Wales) Sophie Ingle	(yellow card) 38'
LM	10	(South Korea) Ji So-yun		(substituted off) 73'
RF	14	(England) Fran Kirby
CF	23	(Denmark) Pernille Harder
LF	20	(Australia) Sam Kerr		(substituted off) 73'
Substitutes:
GK	1	(Sweden) Zećira Mušović
GK	28	(England) Carly Telford
DF	3	(England) Hannah Blundell
DF	25	(Sweden) Jonna Andersson
DF	29	(England) Jorja Fox
MF	11	(Norway) Guro Reiten		(substituted on) 46'
MF	17	(Canada) Jessie Fleming
MF	24	(England) Drew Spence
FW	9	Bethany England		(substituted on) 73'
FW	22	(Scotland) Erin Cuthbert		(substituted on) 73'
FW	33	(England) Agnes Beever-Jones
Manager:
(England) Emma Hayes

GK	1	(Spain) Sandra Paños
RB	8	(Spain) Marta Torrejón		(substituted off) 82'
CB	12	(Spain) Patricia Guijarro
CB	4	(Spain) María Pilar León
LB	15	(Spain) Leila Ouahabi	(yellow card) 69'	(substituted off) 82'
RM	14	(Spain) Aitana Bonmatí
CM	10	(France) Kheira Hamraoui
LM	11	(Spain) Alexia Putellas (c)		(substituted off) 71'
RF	16	(Norway) Caroline Graham Hansen		(substituted off) 62'
CF	7	(Spain) Jennifer Hermoso		(substituted off) 71'
LF	22	(Netherlands) Lieke Martens
Substitutes:
GK	13	(Spain) Cata Coll
GK	25	(Spain) Gemma Font
DF	3	(Spain) Laia Codina
DF	5	(Spain) Melanie Serrano		(substituted on) 82'
DF	18	(Switzerland) Ana-Maria Crnogorčević		(substituted on) 82'
DF	23	(Spain) Jana Fernández
MF	6	(Spain) Vicky Losada		(substituted on) 71'
FW	9	(Spain) Mariona Caldentey		(substituted on) 62'
FW	20	(Nigeria) Asisat Oshoala		(substituted on) 71'
FW	24	(Spain) Bruna Vilamala
Manager:
(Spain) Lluís Cortés

Player of the Match:
Aitana Bonmatí (Barcelona)

Assistant referees:
Katrin Rafalski (Germany)
Sara Telek (Austria)
Fourth official:
Katalin Kulcsár (Hungary)
Reserve assistant referee:
Julia Magnusson (Sweden)
Video assistant referee:
Bastian Dankert (Germany)
Assistant video assistant referee:
Christian Dingert (Germany)

**Match rules**

- 90 minutes
- 30 minutes of extra time if necessary
- Penalty shoot-out if scores still level
- Twelve named substitutes
- Maximum of five substitutions, with a sixth allowed in extra time (Note: Each team was given only three opportunities to make substitutions, with a fourth opportunity in extra time, excluding substitutions made at half-time, before the start of extra time and at half-time in extra time.)

== See also ==
- 2020–21 Chelsea F.C. Women season
- 2020–21 FC Barcelona Femení season
- 2021 UEFA Champions League final
- 2021 UEFA Europa League final
- 2021 UEFA Super Cup
