= Niamh Charles =

English footballer (born 1999)

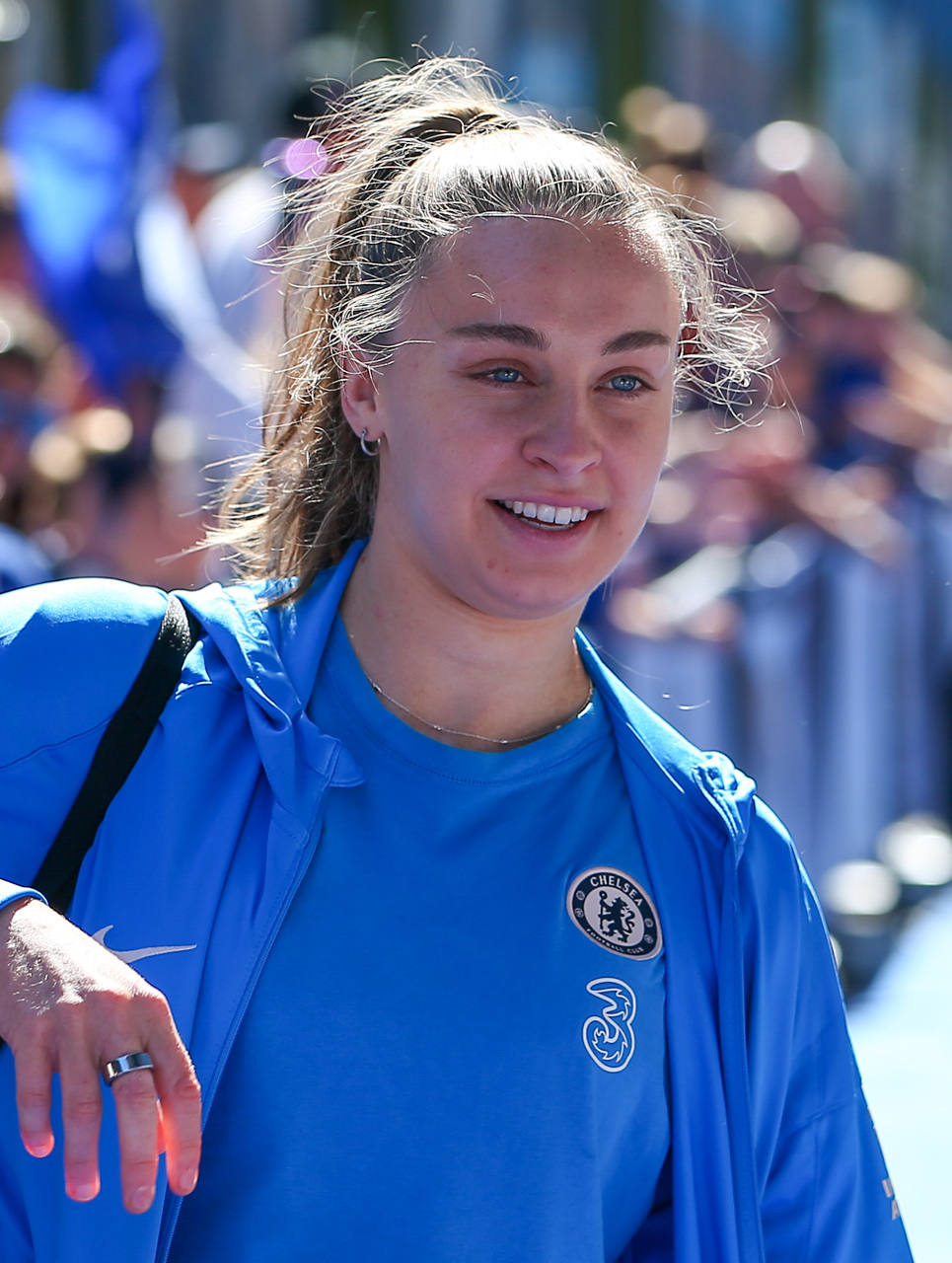
- Charles with Chelsea in 2025

Personal information
- Full name: Niamh Louise Charles
- Date of birth: 21 June 1999 (age 27)
- Place of birth: Wirral, Merseyside, England
- Height: 5 ft 8 in (1.72 m)
- Position: Left-back

Team information
- Current team: Manchester City
- Number: 21

Youth career
- Liverpool

Senior career*
Years	Team	Apps	(Gls)
2016–2020	Liverpool	48	(6)
2020–2026	Chelsea	99	(8)
2026–	Manchester City	4	(1)

International career^{‡}
2015–2016	England U17	14	(10)
2017	England U19	5	(1)
2017–2018	England U20	5	(0)
2021–	England	35	(0)
Medal record
Women's football
Representing England
UEFA Women's Championship
Winner	2025 Switzerland
UEFA–CONMEBOL Finalissima
Winner	2023 England
FIFA Women's World Cup
Runner-up	2023 Australia and New Zealand
- * Club domestic league appearances and goals as of 22:40, 25 October 2026 (UTC) ‡ National team caps and goals as of 23:55, 13 October 2026 (UTC)

Niamh Louise Charles (/niːv/ NEEV; born 21 June 1999) is an English professional footballer who plays as a left-back, and occasionally a right-back, for Women's Super League club Manchester City and the England national team. Beginning her youth and senior career with Liverpool as a forward, she signed for Chelsea in 2020, where she is a five-time WSL winner, four-time FA Cup winner, two-time League Cup winner, and Champions League runner-up. Charles has represented England at U17 to U20 youth levels and made her senior debut for England in 2021. With England, she has won Euro 2025 and two Arnold Clark Cups, and was a World Cup runner-up in 2023.

== Early career ==
Charles grew up on the Wirral in Merseyside and spent her youth career at the West Kirby Wasps. Excelling when playing with boys up to the age of 14, where she was regularly the only female player on the pitch, after a successful trial, she became a member of Liverpool's youth setup, scoring two goals in two games for the under 17s in the 2014–15 season.

== Club career ==
=== Liverpool ===
After impressing in the academy, Charles made her senior debut in April 2016 in a draw against Sunderland. Following her excellent 2016 season with Liverpool and the England U-17s, she was nominated for the Women's Rising Star award at the Northwest Football Awards.

=== Chelsea ===
Following Liverpool's relegation at the end of the 2019–20 season, Charles signed for Chelsea. Although primarily a forward in her youth and Liverpool days, Chelsea coach Emma Hayes deployed her as a full back or wing back on either flank. She won the treble in her first season, and was also the youngest starter on either side in the Champions League final, where Chelsea lost to Barcelona.

Charles won the double with Chelsea the season after, for a third time in 2022–23, establishing herself as a regular starter. A fourth consecutive title followed in the 2023-24 season when Charles also made the WSL team of the year. She suffered a dislocated shoulder in a pre-season friendly against Feyenoord, delaying her first competitive appearance under new coach Sonia Bompastor until December 2024. Under Bompastor, Chelsea remained unbeaten domestically through the season, clinching a second treble in four years with their FA Cup final win over Manchester United on 18 May 2025.

Her 2025-26 season was also disrupted by injury, with a series of ankle issues keeping her out for several months. Charles returned to first-team action in March 2026 and although Chelsea retained the League Cup, they lost their relentless grip on the title, finishing third behind eventual champions Manchester City.

=== Manchester City ===
On 10 July 2026, it was announced that Charles had signed for Manchester City on a three-year contract for a reported fee of £500,000.

== International career ==
In her youth career, Charles represented England at under-17, under-19, and under-20 levels.

During 2016 U-17 European Championship qualifying, Charles was the third-leading scorer for England with six goals. She tied for the Bronze Boot at the final tournament with four goals, scoring both goals in a 2–1 win against Norway in the third-place match. England's third place win qualified them for the 2016 U-17 World Cup, where Charles played in all four matches as England were eliminated by Japan in the quarter-finals.

Charles made her debut for the senior side on April 9, 2021, as a half-time substitute for Alex Greenwood in a friendly against France.

On 27 May 2021, it was announced that Charles had been selected as one of four reserve players for the Great Britain Olympic football team at the 2020 Tokyo Olympics. A year later, she was named in the pre-tournament squad for Euro 2022 on home soil, but became one of three unfortunate players who narrowly missed the cut for the final 23. England went on to win the whole tournament.

Charles has England legacy number 220. The FA announced their legacy numbers scheme to honour the 50th anniversary of England's inaugural international.

On 31 May 2023, Charles was named to the squad for the 2023 World Cup in July 2023. She played in two games during the tournament, featuring in the 6–1 win over China in the group stage and coming on in the semi final victory over hosts Australia.

On 6 June 2025, Charles was included in the squad for UEFA Euro 2025. On 27 July 2025, she came on in the tournament's final as a substitute to replace Lucy Bronze during extra time, and scored a penalty in the shootout as England beat Spain 1-1 (3–1 on penalties). After the tournament, she was named as a guest of honour at Prenton Park, when her local club, Tranmere Rovers, played Shrewsbury Town, in a 4-0 win. She had also previously played at that stadium for Liverpool.

== Career statistics ==
=== Club ===
As of match played 29 October 2026.

Appearances and goals by club, season and competition
Club	Season	League			FA Cup		League Cup		Continental (Note: Includes UEFA Women's Champions League)		Other		Total	
Club	Season	Division	Apps	Goals	Apps	Goals	Apps	Goals	Apps	Goals	Apps	Goals	Apps	Goals
Liverpool	2016	Women's Super League	8	0	0	0	1	0	—		—		9	0
Liverpool	2017	Women's Super League	7	0	1	0	—		—		—		8	0
Liverpool	2017–18	Women's Super League	11	3	0	0	3	0	—		—		14	3
Liverpool	2018–19	Women's Super League	9	1	0	0	1	0	—		—		10	1
Liverpool	2019–20	Women's Super League	13	2	2	1	4	3	—		—		19	6
Liverpool	Total		48	6	3	1	9	3	—		—		60	10
Chelsea	2020–21	Women's Super League	13	1	4	1	4	1	8	0	1 (Note: Appearances in Women's FA Community Shield)	0	30	3
Chelsea	2021–22	Women's Super League	20	1	5	1	3	0	4	0	—		32	2
Chelsea	2022–23	Women's Super League	21	4	5	0	3	0	10	0	—		39	4
Chelsea	2023–24	Women's Super League	22	2	3	0	2	0	9	1	—		36	3
Chelsea	2024–25	Women's Super League	12	0	4	1	3	0	3	0	—		22	1
Chelsea	2025–26	Women's Super League	11	0	2	0	1	0	4	0	—		18	0
Chelsea	Total		99	8	23	3	16	1	38	1	1	0	177	13
Manchester City	2026–27	Women's Super League	4	1	0	0	—		2	0	—		6	1
Career total			151	15	26	4	25	4	40	1	1	0	243	24

=== International ===
As of match played 13 October 2026

Appearances and goals by national team and year
National team	Year	Apps	Goals
England	2021	2	0
England	2022	2	0
England	2023	9	0
England	2024	5	0
England	2025	13	0
England	2026	4	0
Total		35	0

== Honours ==
Chelsea

- Women's Super League: 2020–21, 2021–22, 2022–23, 2023–24, 2024–25
- Women's FA Cup: 2020–21, 2021–22, 2022-23, 2024–25
- FA Women's League Cup: 2020–21, 2024–25, 2025–26
- UEFA Women's Champions League runner-up: 2020–21

England

- FIFA Women's World Cup runner-up: 2023
- UEFA Women's Championship: 2025
- Women's Finalissima: 2023
- Arnold Clark Cup: 2022, 2023

Individual

- PFA WSL Team of the Year: 2023–24
