= Melanie Leupolz =

German footballer (born 1994)

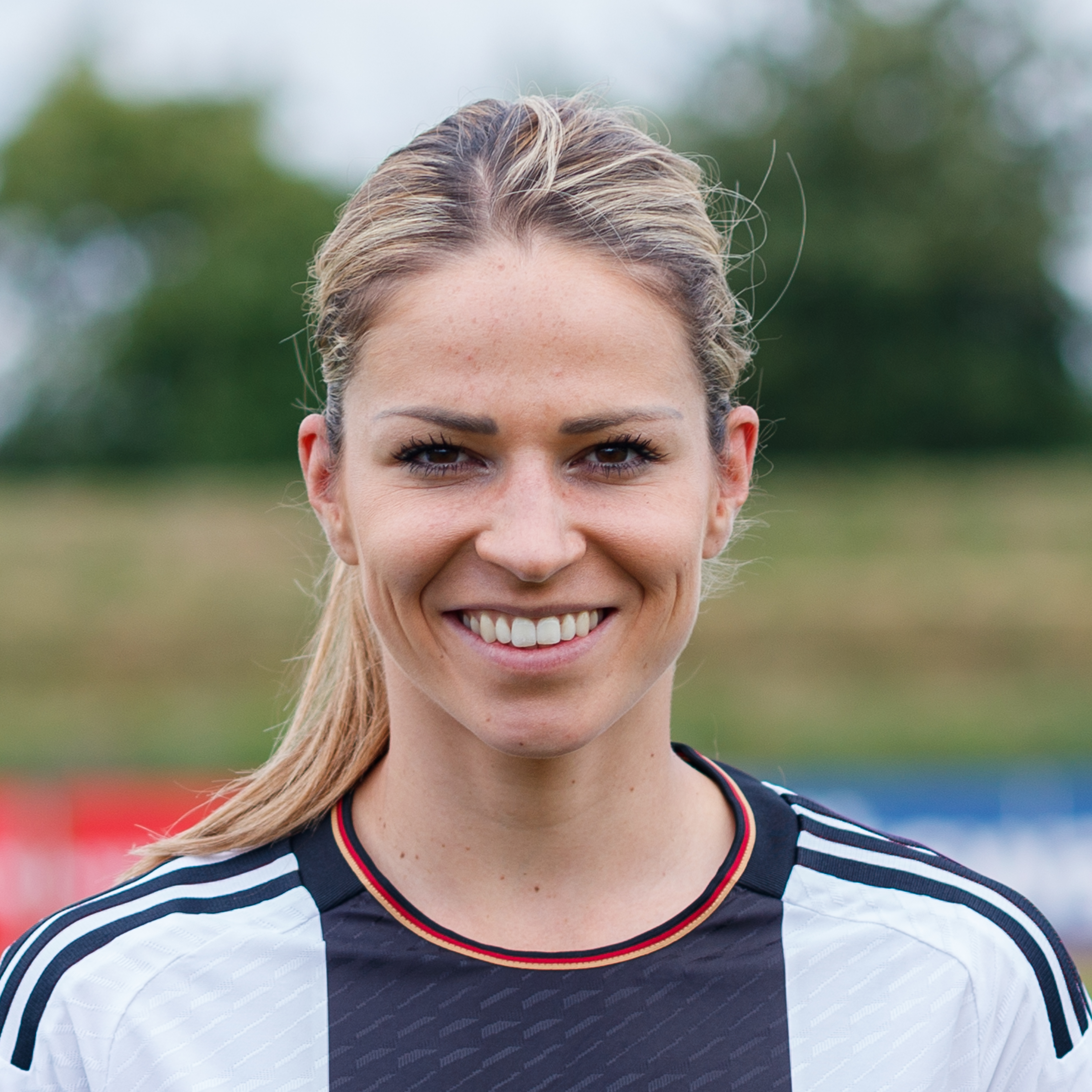
- Leupolz playing for Germany in 2023

Personal information
- Full name: Melanie Leupolz
- Date of birth: 14 April 1994 (age 32)
- Place of birth: Wangen im Allgäu, Germany
- Height: 1.73 m (5 ft 8 in)
- Position: Midfielder

Youth career
- TSV Ratzenried
- –2010: TSV Tettnang

Senior career*
Years	Team	Apps	(Gls)
2010–2014	Freiburg	75	(13)
2014–2020	Bayern Munich	99	(12)
2020–2024	Chelsea	44	(6)
2024–2025	Real Madrid	17	(0)

International career
2009	Germany U15	5	(1)
2009–2011	Germany U17	5	(7)
2011–2013	Germany U19	12	(4)
2012	Germany U20	8	(4)
2013–2023	Germany	79	(13)
Medal record
Women's football
Representing Germany
Olympic Games
Gold medal – first place	2016 Rio de Janeiro	Team
UEFA Women's Championship
Gold medal – first place	2013 Sweden
- * Club domestic league appearances and goals

Melanie Leupolz (born 14 April 1994) is a German former professional footballer who played as a midfielder.

Leupolz played for SC Freiburg and Bayern Munich in Germany's 2. Frauen-Bundesliga/Frauen-Bundesliga, Chelsea in England's Women's Super League, and Real Madrid in Spain's Liga F. Between 2013 and 2023, she played for the Germany national team.

== Club career ==
=== SC Freiburg ===
Having spent her youth career with TSV Ratzenried and TSV Tettnang, Leupolz joined 2. Frauen-Bundesliga club SC Freiburg in 2010.

Following success in the 2010–11 season, Freiburg was promoted to the Frauen-Bundesliga, the top tier of German women's football, for the 2011–12 season. Leupolz made her Bundesliga debut, and scored her first Bundesliga goal, on 21 August 2011 in a 2–2 away draw against SC 07 Bad Neuenahr.

=== Bayern Munich ===
In 2014, she joined fellow Bundesliga club Bayern Munich. She made her club debut on 31 August 2014 in a 1–1 draw against 1. FFC Frankfurt, then scored her first goal for the club in a 4–0 win over Bayer 04 Leverkusen on 2 October 2014.

In her first two seasons with Bayern, Leupolz won back-to-back Bundesliga titles.

In 2018, she extended her contract with the club until 2020. Leupolz captained Bayern during her time at the club.

=== Chelsea ===
On 23 March 2020, Leupolz signed for Chelsea in the Women's Super League. In August, she won the FA Community Shield, her first title with Chelsea. On 13 September, she scored her first goal for the club in a 9–0 win over Bristol City.

On 16 May 2021, Leupolz featured in her first Champions League final; Chelsea lost 4–0 to Barcelona.

On 7 March 2022, it was announced that Leupolz was pregnant and would not feature in the rest of the season's fixtures. Chelsea pledged the support of their medical team.

In January 2023, following her return from maternity leave, Leupolz signed a new contract with Chelsea which would run until 2026. She returned to play three months after giving birth to her son, and was part of the side that won the Women's Super League and FA Cup titles that season.

=== Real Madrid ===
On 3 July 2024, Leupolz signed with Liga F side Real Madrid.

In June 2025, she announced her retirement from play, ending her contract with the club which was originally set to run until 2026.

== International career ==
=== Youth ===
As part of the Germany under-17 squad, Leupolz competed at the 2010 U-17 World Cup and scored two goals against South Africa.

She was the team's captain for the 2011 U-17 European Championship. Leupolz missed the final penalty during the semifinal penalty shootout against France.

=== Senior ===
On 19 June 2013, Leupolz made her debut for Germany's senior national team in a 1–0 win over Canada. The following day she was named to Germany's Euro 2013 squad. On 28 July 2013, Germany beat Norway 1–0 to secure their sixth consecutive Euro title.

She was part of the squad for the 2016 Summer Olympics in Rio where Germany won the gold medal.

At the 2019 World Cup, Leupolz scored a goal in Germany's 4–0 win over South Africa, her first national goal since the 2016 Olympics.

In September 2023, Leupolz announced her international retirement.

== Personal life ==
As of 2021, Leupolz was studying towards a master’s degree in Psychology, Leadership and Management.

In 2022, it was announced that Leupolz was expecting her first child. She gave birth to her son in October 2022, and made her first start after her pregnancy in March 2023.

== Career statistics ==
=== Club ===
As of match played 20 May 2025

Appearances and goals by club, season and competition
Club	Season	League			National cup (Note: Includes Copa de la Reina, DFB-Pokal and Women's FA Cup)		League cup (Note: Includes FA Women's League Cup)		Continental (Note: Includes UEFA Women's Champions League)		Other		Total	
Club	Season	Division	Apps	Goals	Apps	Goals	Apps	Goals	Apps	Goals	Apps	Goals	Apps	Goals
SC Freiburg	2010–11	2. Frauen-Bundesliga	16	6	0	0	—		—		—		17	6
SC Freiburg	2011–12	Frauen-Bundesliga	20	3	1	0	—		—		—		21	3
SC Freiburg	2012–13	Frauen-Bundesliga	21	3	3	0	—		—		—		24	3
SC Freiburg	2013–14	Frauen-Bundesliga	18	1	4	1	—		—		—		22	2
SC Freiburg	Total		75	13	8	1	—		—		—		83	14
Bayern Munich	2014–15	Frauen-Bundesliga	22	4	2	1	—		—		—		24	5
Bayern Munich	2015–16	Frauen-Bundesliga	17	2	4	0	—		2	1	—		23	3
Bayern Munich	2016–17	Frauen-Bundesliga	10	0	1	2	—		1	2	—		12	4
Bayern Munich	2017–18	Frauen-Bundesliga	19	0	4	1	—		2	0	—		25	1
Bayern Munich	2018–19	Frauen-Bundesliga	11	0	4	0	—		5	1	—		20	1
Bayern Munich	2019–20	Frauen-Bundesliga	20	6	1	0	—		3	0	—		24	6
Bayern Munich	Total		99	12	16	4	—		13	4	—		128	20
Chelsea	2020–21	FA WSL	19	5	1	0	4	2	7	1	1 (Note: appearance in Women's FA Community Shield)	0	32	8
Chelsea	2021–22	WSL	7	0	0	0	0	0	6	1	—		13	1
Chelsea	2022–23	WSL	7	0	4	0	2	0	4	0	—		17	0
Chelsea	2023–24	WSL	11	1	4	0	2	0	4	0	—		21	1
Chelsea	Total		44	6	9	0	8	2	21	2	1	0	83	10
Real Madrid	2024–25	Liga F	17	0	1	0	0	0	8	1	1 (Note: Appearance in Supercopa de España)	0	27	1
Real Madrid	Total		17	0	1	0	0	0	8	1	1	0	27	1
Career total			235	31	34	5	8	2	42	7	2	0	321	45

=== International ===
As of 24 July 2023

Appearances and goals by national team and year
National team	Year	Apps	Goals
Germany	2013	10	1
Germany	2014	12	3
Germany	2015	17	3
Germany	2016	9	1
Germany	2017	2	0
Germany	2018	5	0
Germany	2019	10	2
Germany	2020	5	1
Germany	2021	5	2
Germany	2023	4	0
Total		79	13

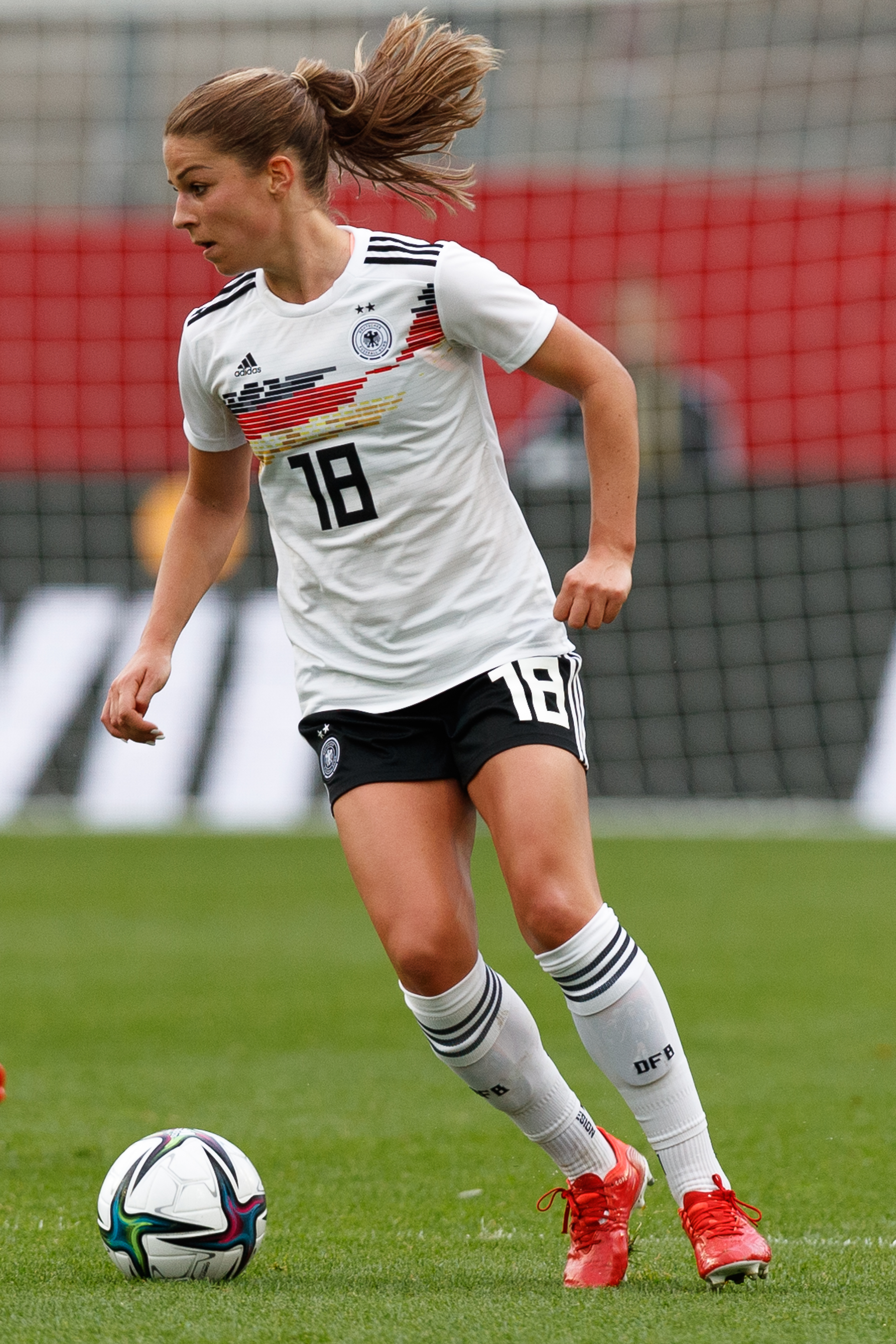
Leupolz during a match with Germany in 2021

Scores and results list Germany's goal tally first, score column indicates score after each Leupolz goal.

List of international goals scored by Melanie Leupolz
No.	Date	Venue	Opponent	Score	Result	Competition
1	21 September 2013	Cottbus, Germany	Russia	6–0	9–0	2015 FIFA Women's World Cup qualification
2	5 April 2014	Dublin, Ireland	Republic of Ireland	3–2	3–2	2015 FIFA Women's World Cup qualification
3	10 April 2014	Mannheim, Germany	Slovenia	1–0	4–0	2015 FIFA Women's World Cup qualification
4	8 May 2014	Osnabrück, Germany	Slovakia	7–0	9–1	2015 FIFA Women's World Cup qualification
5	8 April 2015	Fürth, Germany	Brazil	3–0	4–0	Friendly
6	15 June 2015	Winnipeg, Canada	Thailand	1–0	4–0	2015 FIFA Women's World Cup
7	18 September 2015	Halle, Germany	Hungary	11–0	12–0	UEFA Women's Euro 2017 qualifying
8	3 August 2016	São Paulo, Brazil	Zimbabwe	5–0	6–1	2016 Summer Olympics
9	17 June 2019	Montpellier, France	South Africa	1–0	4–0	2019 FIFA Women's World Cup
10	5 October 2019	Aachen, Germany	Ukraine	7–0	8–0	UEFA Women's Euro 2021 qualifying
11	22 September 2020	Podgorica, Montenegro	Montenegro	2–0	3–0	UEFA Women's Euro 2021 qualifying
12	21 September 2021	Chemnitz, Germany	Serbia	5–1	5–1	2023 FIFA Women's World Cup qualification
13	30 November 2021	Faro, Portugal	Portugal	3–0	3–1	2023 FIFA Women's World Cup qualification

== Honours ==
Bayern Munich

- Bundesliga: 2014–15, 2015–16

Chelsea

- FA Women's Super League: 2020–21, 2021-22, 2022–23, 2023–24
- FA Women's League Cup: 2020–21
- FA Community Shield: 2020
- FA Women's Cup: 2020-21, 2021-22, 2022-23

Germany U-20

- FIFA U-20 Women's World Cup: 2012 runner-up

Germany

- Summer Olympics: 2016
- UEFA Women's Championship: 2013
- Algarve Cup: 2014
