= Riem Hussein =

German football referee

Dr Riem Hussein
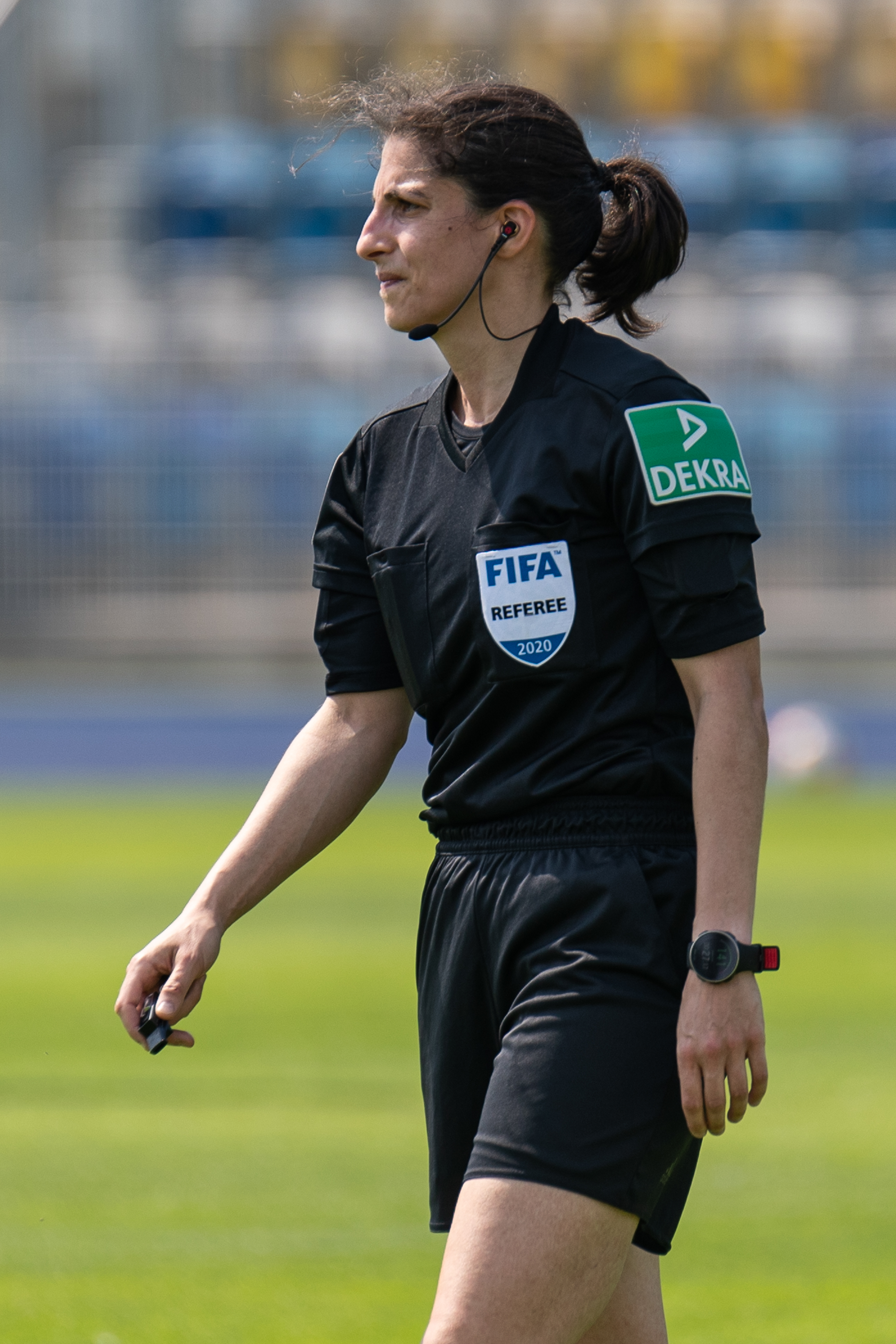
- Hussein in 2020
- Full name: Dr Riem Hussein
- Born: 26 July 1980 (age 46); Bad Harzburg, West Germany

Domestic
Years	League	Role
2015–	3. Liga	Referee
2008–	Regionalliga Nord	Referee

International
Years	League	Role
2009–	FIFA listed	Referee

Dr Riem Hussein (born 26 July 1980) is a German international football referee. She has been officiating internationally since 2009.

== Career ==
Since 2015, Hussein has been a referee in Germany's third tier of men's football, the 3. Liga.

Hussein was appointed to be a referee at the 2019 FIFA Women's World Cup in France. She was also appointed to be a referee at the UEFA Women's Euro 2022 in England.

Hussein also officiated the 2021 UEFA Women's Champions League Final between Chelsea and Barcelona.

== Personal life ==
Hussein is of Palestinian descent who primarily works as a pharmacist. In 2009, she obtained a PhD from the Technical University of Braunschweig.
