= Football at the 2020 Summer Olympics – Women's qualification =

Twelve teams competed in the 2020 women's Olympic football tournament (postponed to 2021 due to the COVID-19 pandemic).

== Table ==
Means of qualification	Dates^{1}	Venue(s)^{1}	Berth(s)	Qualified
Host nation	—N/a	—N/a	1	Japan
2018 Copa América	4–22 April 2018	Chile	1	Brazil
2018 OFC Nations Cup	18 November – 1 December 2018	New Caledonia	1	New Zealand
2019 FIFA Women's World Cup (as UEFA qualifying)	7 June – 7 July 2019	France	3	Netherlands; Sweden; Great Britain
2020 CONCACAF Olympic Qualifying Championship	28 January – 9 February 2020	United States	2	United States; Canada
2020 CAF Olympic Qualifying Tournament	5–10 March 2020	Multiple	1	Zambia
2020 AFC Olympic Qualifying Tournament	6–11 March 2020 & 8–13 April 2021	Multiple	2	Australia; China
CAF–CONMEBOL play-off	10–13 April 2021	Turkey	1	Chile
Total			12	

- ^1 Dates and venues are those of final tournaments (or final round of qualification tournaments), various qualification stages may precede matches at these specific venues.

== 2018 Copa América ==
Brazil earned an Olympic qualification place by winning the Copa América. Chile advanced to the playoff round against Cameroon, the second-place team from the CAF qualifying tournament.

=== Qualified teams ===
All ten CONMEBOL member national teams entered the tournament.

Team	Appearance	Previous best performance	FIFA ranking at start of event
Argentina	7th	Champions (2006)	37
Bolivia	7th	Fifth place (1995)	84
Brazil (holders)	8th	Champions (1991, 1995, 1998, 2003, 2010, 2014)	8
Chile (hosts)	8th	Runners-up (1991)	40
Colombia	6th	Runners-up (2010, 2014)	24
Ecuador	7th	Third place (2014)	Not ranked
Paraguay	6th	Fourth place (2006)	50
Peru	6th	Third place (1998)	59
Uruguay	6th	Third place (2006)	68
Venezuela	7th	Third place (1991)	64

=== First stage ===
==== Group A ====
Pos	Team	Pld	W	D	L	GF	GA	GD	Pts	Qualification
1	Colombia	4	3	1	0	16	2	+14	10	Final stage
2	Chile	4	2	2	0	8	2	+6	8	Final stage
3	Paraguay	4	2	1	1	7	7	0	7	
4	Uruguay	4	0	1	3	2	11	−9	1	
5	Peru	4	0	1	3	1	12	−11	1	

Source: CONMEBOL
Rules for classification: First stage tiebreakers

==== Group B ====
Pos	Team	Pld	W	D	L	GF	GA	GD	Pts	Qualification
1	Brazil	4	4	0	0	22	1	+21	12	Final stage
2	Argentina	4	3	0	1	12	6	+6	9	Final stage
3	Venezuela	4	2	0	2	9	6	+3	6	
4	Bolivia	4	1	0	3	1	18	−17	3	
5	Ecuador	4	0	0	4	3	16	−13	0	

Source: CONMEBOL
Rules for classification: First stage tiebreakers

=== Final stage ===
Pos	Team	Pld	W	D	L	GF	GA	GD	Pts	Qualification
1	Brazil	3	3	0	0	9	1	+8	9	2020 Summer Olympics
2	Chile	3	1	1	1	5	3	+2	4	CAF–CONMEBOL play-off
3	Argentina	3	1	0	2	3	8	−5	3	
4	Colombia	3	0	1	2	1	6	−5	1	

Source: CONMEBOL
Rules for classification: Final stage tiebreakers

== 2018 OFC Nations Cup ==
New Zealand earned an Olympic qualification place by winning the Nations Cup.

=== Qualified teams ===
All 11 OFC member national teams entered the tournament. The top seven ranked teams advanced to the final automatically, with the remaining four competing in a qualification stage for the final place. Tahiti and New Caledonia, as French administrative divisions, were not eligible to compete at the Women's Olympic Football Tournament.

Team	Method of qualification	Appearance	Previous best performance	FIFA ranking at start of event
Cook Islands	Automatic	4th	Third place (2010, 2014)	
New Caledonia	Automatic	2nd	Third place (1983)	
New Zealand	Automatic	11th	Champions (1983, 1991, 2007, 2010, 2014)	
Papua New Guinea	Automatic	9th	Runners-up (2007, 2010, 2014)	
Samoa	Automatic	3rd	Fourth place (2003)	
Tahiti	Automatic	2nd	Group stage (2010)	
Tonga	Automatic	4th	Third place (2007)	
Fiji	Qualification winner	3rd	Fourth place (1983, 1998)	

=== Group stage ===
==== Group A ====
Pos	Team	Pld	W	D	L	GF	GA	GD	Pts	Qualification
1	Papua New Guinea	3	3	0	0	14	3	+11	9	Knockout stage
2	New Caledonia (H)	3	2	0	1	8	8	0	6	Knockout stage
3	Tahiti	3	0	1	2	8	12	−4	1	
4	Samoa	3	0	1	2	5	12	−7	1	

Source: OFC
Rules for classification: Tiebreakers
(H) Hosts

==== Group B ====
Pos	Team	Pld	W	D	L	GF	GA	GD	Pts	Qualification
1	New Zealand	3	3	0	0	27	0	+27	9	Knockout stage
2	Fiji	3	2	0	1	15	10	+5	6	Knockout stage
3	Tonga	3	1	0	2	1	23	−22	3	
4	Cook Islands	3	0	0	3	0	10	−10	0	

Source: OFC
Rules for classification: Tiebreakers

=== Final stage ===
Semi-finals
28 November – Maré
Papua New Guinea	1
Fiji	5
28 November – Lifou
New Zealand	8
New Caledonia	0

Final
1 December – Nouméa
Fiji	0
New Zealand	8
Third place match
1 December – Nouméa
Papua New Guinea	7
New Caledonia	1

== UEFA qualification through the 2019 FIFA Women's World Cup ==
Nine teams from UEFA competed at the World Cup, with the three best-placed European teams earning an Olympic qualification place. Three UEFA teams reached the semi-finals of the World Cup, which earned an Olympic qualification place for Great Britain (through England's performance), the Netherlands and Sweden, with Sweden eliminating reigning Olympic champions Germany.

Great Britain qualified through England's performance in the World Cup (a procedure already successfully employed by Team GB in field hockey and rugby sevens), based on a format agreed by the four British football associations (England, Northern Ireland, Scotland, and Wales). Scotland also qualified for the World Cup but, under the agreement whereby the highest-ranked home nation is nominated to compete for the purposes of Olympic qualification, their performance was not taken into account. Scotland players, along with Welsh and Northern Irish players, will be eligible for the Great Britain team in Tokyo.

=== Qualified UEFA teams ===
Team	Qualified as	Qualification date	Appearance in finals	Last appearance	Streak	Previous best performance	2019 performance
Netherlands	UEFA qualification play-off winners	13 November 2018	2nd	2015	2	Round of 16 (2015)	Runners-up
Sweden	UEFA qualification Group 4 winners	4 September 2018	8th	2015	8	Runners-up (2003)	Third place
England (for Great Britain)	UEFA qualification Group 1 winners	31 August 2018	5th	2015	4	Third place (2015)	Fourth place
France	Hosts	19 March 2015	4th	2015	3	Fourth place (2011)	Quarter-finals
Germany	UEFA qualification Group 5 winners	4 September 2018	8th	2015	8	Champions (2003, 2007)	Quarter-finals
Italy	UEFA qualification Group 6 winners	8 June 2018	3rd	1999	1	Quarter-finals (1991)	Quarter-finals
Norway	UEFA qualification Group 3 winners	4 September 2018	8th	2015	8	Champions (1995)	Quarter-finals
Spain	UEFA qualification Group 7 winners	8 June 2018	2nd	2015	2	Group stage (2015)	Round of 16
Scotland	UEFA qualification Group 2 winners	4 September 2018	1st	–	1	Debut	Group Stage

== 2020 CONCACAF Olympic Qualifying Championship ==
The United States and Canada qualified for Olympic by winning the semi-finals of the Olympic Qualifying Championship.

=== Group stage ===
==== Group A ====
Pos	Team	Pld	W	D	L	GF	GA	GD	Pts	Qualification
1	United States (H)	3	3	0	0	18	0	+18	9	Advance to knockout stage
2	Costa Rica	3	2	0	1	8	7	+1	6	Advance to knockout stage
3	Haiti	3	1	0	2	6	6	0	3	
4	Panama	3	0	0	3	1	20	−19	0	

Source: CONCACAF
(H) Hosts
28 January 2020
17:00

Costa Rica	6–1	Panama
Herrera 9', 72'; R. Rodríguez 16' (pen.); S. Cruz 67'; Chinchilla 70'; Elizondo 83'	Report	Castillo 45'

BBVA Stadium, Houston, Texas
Referee: Lucila Venegas (Mexico)
28 January 2020
19:30

United States	4–0	Haiti
Press 2'; Williams 67'; Horan 73'; Lloyd 90+3'	Report

BBVA Stadium, Houston, Texas
Attendance: 4,363
Referee: Odette Hamilton (Jamaica)

31 January 2020
17:00

Haiti	0–2	Costa Rica
	Report	R. Rodríguez 57', 66'

BBVA Stadium, Houston, Texas
Referee: Francia González (Mexico)
31 January 2020
19:30

Panama	0–8	United States
	Report	Horan 3', 18', 81'; Williams 16'; Lavelle 21'; Press 70'; McDonald 72'; Heath 79'

BBVA Stadium, Houston, Texas
Attendance: 14,121
Referee: Myriam Marcotte (Canada)

3 February 2020
17:00

Panama	0–6	Haiti
	Report	Mondésir 5' (pen.), 84'; Saint-Félix 12', 29'; Dumornay 47'; B. Louis 59'

BBVA Stadium, Houston, Texas
Referee: Myriam Marcotte (Canada)
3 February 2020
19:30

United States	6–0	Costa Rica
Press 4', 36'; Horan 10'; Mewis 63', 83'; McDonald 77'	Report

BBVA Stadium, Houston, Texas
Attendance: 7,082
Referee: Francia González (Mexico)

=== Group B ===
Pos	Team	Pld	W	D	L	GF	GA	GD	Pts	Qualification
1	Canada	3	3	0	0	22	0	+22	9	Advance to knockout stage
2	Mexico	3	2	0	1	7	2	+5	6	Advance to knockout stage
3	Jamaica	3	1	0	2	7	10	−3	3	
4	Saint Kitts and Nevis	3	0	0	3	0	24	−24	0	

Source: CONCACAF
29 January 2020
16:30

Canada	11–0	Saint Kitts and Nevis
Sinclair 7' (pen.), 23'; Leon 12', 26', 43', 80'; Lawrence 18', 57'; Riviere 40'; Fleming 54'; Huitema 74'	Report

H-E-B Park, Edinburg, Texas
Attendance: 820
Referee: Crystal Sobers (Trinidad and Tobago)
29 January 2020
19:00

Mexico	1–0	Jamaica
Cuéllar 36'	Report

H-E-B Park, Edinburg, Texas
Referee: Katja Koroleva (United States)

1 February 2020
14:30

Saint Kitts and Nevis	0–6	Mexico
	Report	Palacios 3'; López 4'; Mayor 9' (pen.); Cuéllar 22', 52'; Mercado 76'

H-E-B Park, Edinburg, Texas
Referee: Tatiana Guzmán (Nicaragua)
1 February 2020
16:30

Jamaica	0–9	Canada
	Report	Huitema 10', 55', 62', 81', 90+3'; Rose 16'; Beckie 44', 51', 66'

H-E-B Park, Edinburg, Texas
Attendance: 2,010
Referee: Melissa Borjas (Honduras)

4 February 2020
17:30

Canada	2–0	Mexico
Sinclair 26'; Zadorsky 45+2'	Report

H-E-B Park, Edinburg, Texas
Referee: Katja Koroleva (United States)
4 February 2020
19:30

Jamaica	7–0	Saint Kitts and Nevis
Shaw 38', 57'; Cameron 40'; Solaun 51'; Carter 68' (pen.); McCoy 70', 85'	Report

H-E-B Park, Edinburg, Texas
Referee: Crystal Sobers (Trinidad and Tobago)

== Knockout stage ==
All times are local, PST (UTC−8).

=== Bracket ===
Semi-finals
7 February – Carson, CA
Canada	1
Costa Rica	0
7 February – Carson, CA
United States	4
Mexico	0

Final
9 February – Carson, CA
Canada	0
United States	3

=== Semi-finals ===
The semi-final winners qualified for the 2020 Summer Olympics.

7 February 2020
16:00

Canada	1–0	Costa Rica
Huitema 72'	Report

Dignity Health Sports Park, Carson, California
Referee: Lucila Venegas (Mexico)

7 February 2020
19:00

United States	4–0	Mexico
Lavelle 5'; Mewis 14', 67'; Press 74'	Report

Dignity Health Sports Park, Carson, California
Attendance: 11,292
Referee: Melissa Borjas (Honduras)

=== Final ===
9 February 2020
15:00

Canada	0–3	United States
	Report	Williams 61'; Horan 71'; Rapinoe 87'

Dignity Health Sports Park, Carson, California
Attendance: 17,489
Referee: Tatiana Guzmán (Nicaragua)

== Goalscorers ==
There were 77 goals scored in 15 matches, for an average of 5.13 goals per match.

7 goals

- (Canada) Jordyn Huitema

6 goals

- (United States) Lindsey Horan

5 goals

- (United States) Christen Press

4 goals

- (Canada) Adriana Leon
- (United States) Sam Mewis

3 goals

- (Canada) Janine Beckie
- (Canada) Christine Sinclair
- (Costa Rica) Raquel Rodríguez
- (Mexico) Renae Cuéllar
- (United States) Lynn Williams

2 goals

- (Canada) Ashley Lawrence
- (Costa Rica) Melissa Herrera
- (Haiti) Nérilia Mondésir
- (Haiti) Mikerline Saint-Félix
- (Jamaica) Kayla McCoy
- (Jamaica) Khadija Shaw
- (United States) Rose Lavelle
- (United States) Jessica McDonald

1 goal

- (Canada) Jessie Fleming
- (Canada) Jayde Riviere
- (Canada) Deanne Rose
- (Canada) Shelina Zadorsky
- (Costa Rica) Priscila Chinchilla
- (Costa Rica) Shirley Cruz
- (Costa Rica) Jazmín Elizondo
- (Haiti) Melchie Dumornay
- (Haiti) Batcheba Louis
- (Jamaica) Tiffany Cameron
- (Jamaica) Trudi Carter
- (Jamaica) Havana Solaun
- (Mexico) Jimena López
- (Mexico) Stephany Mayor
- (Mexico) Liliana Mercado
- (Mexico) Kiana Palacios
- (Panama) Katherine Castillo
- (United States) Tobin Heath
- (United States) Carli Lloyd
- (United States) Megan Rapinoe

== Awards ==
The following awards were given at the conclusion of the tournament.

Award	Winner
Golden Ball	(United States) Christen Press
Golden Boot	(Canada) Jordyn Huitema
Golden Glove	(Canada) Stephanie Labbé
Fair Play Award	United States

CONCACAF also released a "Best XI" of the tournament.

Goalkeeper	Defenders	Midfielders	Forwards
(Canada) Stephanie Labbé	(Canada) Kadeisha Buchanan (Canada) Ashley Lawrence (Costa Rica) Stephannie Blanco (United States) Crystal Dunn	(Costa Rica) Raquel Rodríguez (Haiti) Nérilia Mondésir (United States) Lindsey Horan	(Canada) Jordyn Huitema (Mexico) Renae Cuéllar (United States) Christen Press

== Qualified teams for Summer Olympics ==
The following two teams from CONCACAF qualified for the 2020 Summer Olympic women's football tournament.

Team	Qualified on	Previous appearances in Summer Olympics^{1}
Canada	7 February 2020	3 (2008, 2012, 2016)
United States	7 February 2020	6 (**1996**, 2000, **2004**, **2008**, **2012**, 2016)

^{1} Bold indicates champions for that year. Italic indicates hosts for that year.

== Controversy ==
- In the 19th minute of the group stage match between the United States and Haiti, Haiti's Roseline Éloissaint scored a header from a corner kick. However, the assistant referee signalled that Éloissaint was at an offside position, and Éloissaint's goal was subsequently disallowed. According to the Laws of the Game, there was no offside offense since Éloissaint received the ball directly from a corner kick.

==== Group B ====
Pos	Team	Pld	W	D	L	GF	GA	GD	Pts	Qualification
1	Canada	3	3	0	0	22	0	+22	**9**	Advance to knockout stage
2	Mexico	3	2	0	1	7	2	+5	**6**	Advance to knockout stage
3	Jamaica	3	1	0	2	7	10	−3	**3**	
4	Saint Kitts and Nevis	3	0	0	3	0	24	−24	**0**	

Source: CONCACAF
29 January 2020
16:30

Canada	11–0	Saint Kitts and Nevis
Sinclair 7' (pen.), 23'; Leon 12', 26', 43', 80'; Lawrence 18', 57'; Riviere 40'; Fleming 54'; Huitema 74'	Report

H-E-B Park, Edinburg, Texas
Attendance: 820
Referee: Crystal Sobers (Trinidad and Tobago)
29 January 2020
19:00

Mexico	1–0	Jamaica
Cuéllar 36'	Report

H-E-B Park, Edinburg, Texas
Referee: Katja Koroleva (United States)

1 February 2020
14:30

Saint Kitts and Nevis	0–6	Mexico
	Report	Palacios 3'; López 4'; Mayor 9' (pen.); Cuéllar 22', 52'; Mercado 76'

H-E-B Park, Edinburg, Texas
Referee: Tatiana Guzmán (Nicaragua)
1 February 2020
16:30

Jamaica	0–9	Canada
	Report	Huitema 10', 55', 62', 81', 90+3'; Rose 16'; Beckie 44', 51', 66'

H-E-B Park, Edinburg, Texas
Attendance: 2,010
Referee: Melissa Borjas (Honduras)

4 February 2020
17:30

Canada	2–0	Mexico
Sinclair 26'; Zadorsky 45+2'	Report

H-E-B Park, Edinburg, Texas
Referee: Katja Koroleva (United States)
4 February 2020
19:30

Jamaica	7–0	Saint Kitts and Nevis
Shaw 38', 57'; Cameron 40'; Solaun 51'; Carter 68' (pen.); McCoy 70', 85'	Report

H-E-B Park, Edinburg, Texas
Referee: Crystal Sobers (Trinidad and Tobago)

== Knockout stage ==
All times are local, PST (UTC−8).

=== Bracket ===
Semi-finals
7 February – Carson, CA
**Canada**	**1**
Costa Rica	0
7 February – Carson, CA
**United States**	**4**
Mexico	0

Final
9 February – Carson, CA
Canada	0
**United States**	**3**

=== Semi-finals ===
The semi-final winners qualified for the 2020 Summer Olympics.

7 February 2020
16:00

Canada	1–0	Costa Rica
Huitema 72'	Report

Dignity Health Sports Park, Carson, California
Referee: Lucila Venegas (Mexico)

7 February 2020
19:00

United States	4–0	Mexico
Lavelle 5'; Mewis 14', 67'; Press 74'	Report

Dignity Health Sports Park, Carson, California
Attendance: 11,292
Referee: Melissa Borjas (Honduras)

=== Final ===
9 February 2020
15:00

Canada	0–3	United States
	Report	Williams 61'; Horan 71'; Rapinoe 87'

Dignity Health Sports Park, Carson, California
Attendance: 17,489
Referee: Tatiana Guzmán (Nicaragua)

== Goalscorers ==
There were 77 goals scored in 15 matches, for an average of 5.13 goals per match.

7 goals

- (Canada) Jordyn Huitema

6 goals

- (United States) Lindsey Horan

5 goals

- (United States) Christen Press

4 goals

- (Canada) Adriana Leon
- (United States) Sam Mewis

3 goals

- (Canada) Janine Beckie
- (Canada) Christine Sinclair
- (Costa Rica) Raquel Rodríguez
- (Mexico) Renae Cuéllar
- (United States) Lynn Williams

2 goals

- (Canada) Ashley Lawrence
- (Costa Rica) Melissa Herrera
- (Haiti) Nérilia Mondésir
- (Haiti) Mikerline Saint-Félix
- (Jamaica) Kayla McCoy
- (Jamaica) Khadija Shaw
- (United States) Rose Lavelle
- (United States) Jessica McDonald

1 goal

- (Canada) Jessie Fleming
- (Canada) Jayde Riviere
- (Canada) Deanne Rose
- (Canada) Shelina Zadorsky
- (Costa Rica) Priscila Chinchilla
- (Costa Rica) Shirley Cruz
- (Costa Rica) Jazmín Elizondo
- (Haiti) Melchie Dumornay
- (Haiti) Batcheba Louis
- (Jamaica) Tiffany Cameron
- (Jamaica) Trudi Carter
- (Jamaica) Havana Solaun
- (Mexico) Jimena López
- (Mexico) Stephany Mayor
- (Mexico) Liliana Mercado
- (Mexico) Kiana Palacios
- (Panama) Katherine Castillo
- (United States) Tobin Heath
- (United States) Carli Lloyd
- (United States) Megan Rapinoe

== Awards ==
The following awards were given at the conclusion of the tournament.

Award	Winner
Golden Ball	(United States) Christen Press
Golden Boot	(Canada) Jordyn Huitema
Golden Glove	(Canada) Stephanie Labbé
Fair Play Award	United States

CONCACAF also released a "Best XI" of the tournament.

Goalkeeper	Defenders	Midfielders	Forwards
(Canada) Stephanie Labbé	(Canada) Kadeisha Buchanan (Canada) Ashley Lawrence (Costa Rica) Stephannie Blanco (United States) Crystal Dunn	(Costa Rica) Raquel Rodríguez (Haiti) Nérilia Mondésir (United States) Lindsey Horan	(Canada) Jordyn Huitema (Mexico) Renae Cuéllar (United States) Christen Press

== Qualified teams for Summer Olympics ==
The following two teams from CONCACAF qualified for the 2020 Summer Olympic women's football tournament.

Team	Qualified on	Previous appearances in Summer Olympics^{1}
Canada	7 February 2020	3 (2008, 2012, 2016)
United States	7 February 2020	6 (**1996**, 2000, **2004**, **2008**, **2012**, 2016)

^{1} Bold indicates champions for that year. Italic indicates hosts for that year.

== Controversy ==
- In the 19th minute of the group stage match between the United States and Haiti, Haiti's Roseline Éloissaint scored a header from a corner kick. However, the assistant referee signalled that Éloissaint was at an offside position, and Éloissaint's goal was subsequently disallowed. According to the Laws of the Game, there was no offside offense since Éloissaint received the ball directly from a corner kick.

=== Final stage ===
Semi-finals
7 February – Carson, CA
**Canada**	**1**
Costa Rica	0
7 February – Carson, CA
**United States**	**4**
Mexico	0

Final
9 February – Carson, CA
Canada	0
**United States**	**3**

== 2020 CAF Olympic qualifying tournament ==
Zambia earned an Olympic qualification place by winning the qualifying tournament. Cameroon will advance to the playoff round against Chile, the second-place team from the CONMEBOL qualifying tournament.

=== Bracket ===
First round
**Ivory Coast**	—	—	w/o
Sierra Leone	—	—
**Mali**	3	2	5
Morocco	1	2	3
**Algeria**	2	1	3
Chad	0	1	1
**Ethiopia**	3	1	4
Uganda	2	0	2
Tanzania	2	0	2
**DR Congo**	2	1	3
**Gabon** (p)	0	2	2 (5)
Congo	2	0	2 (3)
**Malawi**	11	3	14
Mozambique	1	0	1
Angola	—	—
**Zambia**	—	—	w/o
**Botswana**	1	2	3
Namibia	0	2	2

Second round
**Ivory Coast**	3	0	3
Mali	0	0	0
Algeria	0	0	0
**Nigeria**	2	1	3
Ethiopia	1	0	1
**Cameroon** (a)	1	0	1
**DR Congo**	—	—	w/o
Equatorial Guinea	—	—
Gabon	0	0	0
**Ghana**	3	2	5
Malawi	3	0	3
**Kenya**	2	3	5
**Zambia** (Note: Zimbabwe Football Association failed to field a side for the second leg against Zambia after its players refused to fulfill the fixture as they were owed allowances from the 2019 COSAFA Women's Championship.)	5	—	w/o
Zimbabwe	0	—
**Botswana** (p)	0	0	0 (3)
South Africa	0	0	0 (2)

Third round
**Ivory Coast** (a)	0	1	1
Nigeria	0	1	1
**Cameroon**	2	1	3
DR Congo	0	2	2
Ghana	0	0	0
**Kenya** (a.e.t.)	0	1	1
**Zambia**	1	2	3
Botswana	0	0	0

Fourth round
Ivory Coast	0	1	1
**Cameroon**	0	2	2
Kenya	2	0	2
**Zambia**	2	1	3

Fifth round
Cameroon	3	1	4
**Zambia** (a)	2	2	4

== 2020 AFC Olympic qualifying tournament ==
Australia and China qualified for Olympic by winning the play-off round of the Olympic Qualifying Tournament.

=== Qualified teams ===
Teams entering third round	Teams entering second round	Teams entering first round				
Teams entering third round	Teams entering second round	Pot 1	Pot 2	Pot 3	Pot 4	Pot 5 (unranked)
Australia; China; North Korea; South Korea; Thailand	Vietnam; Uzbekistan	Chinese Taipei; Myanmar; Jordan; Iran	India; Philippines; Hong Kong; Indonesia	United Arab Emirates; Palestine; Singapore; Nepal	Tajikistan; Bangladesh; Maldives	Lebanon; Macau^{1} Mongolia

=== First round ===
Group A

Pos	Team	Pld	W	D	L	GF	GA	GD	Pts	Qualification
1	Chinese Taipei	4	4	0	0	33	0	+33	**12**	Second round
2	Philippines	4	3	0	1	17	7	+10	**9**	Second round
3	Tajikistan (H)	4	2	0	2	11	13	−2	**6**	
4	Mongolia	4	0	1	3	4	20	−16	**1**	
5	Singapore	4	0	1	3	2	27	−25	**1**	

Source: AFC
Rules for classification: Qualification tiebreakers
(H) Hosts

Group B

Pos	Team	Pld	W	D	L	GF	GA	GD	Pts	Qualification
1	Iran	2	1	1	0	9	1	+8	**4**	Second round
2	Hong Kong	2	1	1	0	5	1	+4	**4**	Second round
3	Lebanon	2	0	0	2	0	12	−12	**0**	
4	United Arab Emirates	0	0	0	0	0	0	0	**0**	Withdrew
5	Macau	0	0	0	0	0	0	0	**0**	Withdrew

Source: AFC
Rules for classification: Qualification tiebreakers

Group C

Pos	Team	Pld	W	D	L	GF	GA	GD	Pts	Qualification
1	Myanmar (H)	3	2	1	0	8	2	+6	**7**	Second round
2	India	3	1	1	1	9	4	+5	**4**	Second round
3	Nepal	3	0	3	0	3	3	0	**3**	Second round
4	Bangladesh	3	0	1	2	2	13	−11	**1**	

Source: AFC
Rules for classification: Qualification tiebreakers
(H) Hosts

Group D

Pos	Team	Pld	W	D	L	GF	GA	GD	Pts	Qualification
1	Jordan	3	3	0	0	16	0	+16	**9**	Second round
2	Indonesia	3	1	1	1	4	5	−1	**4**	Second round
3	Palestine (H)	3	1	1	1	3	9	−6	**4**	Second round
4	Maldives	3	0	0	3	2	11	−9	**0**	

Source: AFC
Rules for classification: Qualification tiebreakers
(H) Hosts

=== Second round ===
Group A

Pos	Team	Pld	W	D	L	GF	GA	GD	Pts	Qualification
1	Myanmar (H)	3	2	1	0	12	4	+8	**7**	Third round
2	India	3	2	1	0	8	4	+4	**7**	
3	Nepal	3	1	0	2	4	7	−3	**3**	
4	Indonesia	3	0	0	3	1	10	−9	**0**	

Source: AFC
Rules for classification: Qualification tiebreakers
(H) Hosts

Group B

Pos	Team	Pld	W	D	L	GF	GA	GD	Pts	Qualification
1	Vietnam	3	3	0	0	6	2	+4	**9**	Third round
2	Uzbekistan (H)	3	2	0	1	8	3	+5	**6**	
3	Jordan	3	0	1	2	0	4	−4	**1**	
4	Hong Kong	3	0	1	2	2	7	−5	**1**	

Source: AFC
Rules for classification: Qualification tiebreakers
(H) Hosts

Group C

Pos	Team	Pld	W	D	L	GF	GA	GD	Pts	Qualification
1	Chinese Taipei	3	3	0	0	11	3	+8	**9**	Third round
2	Philippines	3	2	0	1	11	4	+7	**6**	
3	Iran	3	1	0	2	10	6	+4	**3**	
4	Palestine	3	0	0	3	0	19	−19	**0**	

Source: AFC
Rules for classification: Qualification tiebreakers

=== Third round ===
Group A

Pos	Team	Pld	W	D	L	GF	GA	GD	Pts	Qualification
1	South Korea (H)	2	2	0	0	10	0	+10	**6**	Play-off round
2	Vietnam	2	1	0	1	1	3	−2	**3**	Play-off round
3	Myanmar	2	0	0	2	0	8	−8	**0**	
4	North Korea	0	0	0	0	0	0	0	**0**	Withdrew

Source: AFC
Rules for classification: Qualification tiebreakers
(H) Hosts

Group B

Pos	Team	Pld	W	D	L	GF	GA	GD	Pts	Qualification
1	Australia (H)	3	2	1	0	14	1	+13	**7**	Play-off round
2	China	3	2	1	0	12	2	+10	**7**	Play-off round
3	Chinese Taipei	3	1	0	2	1	12	−11	**3**	
4	Thailand	3	0	0	3	1	13	−12	**0**	

Source: AFC
Rules for classification: Qualification tiebreakers
(H) Hosts

=== Play-off round ===
Team 1	Agg.	Team 2	1st leg	2nd leg
**Australia**	7–1	Vietnam	5–0	2–1
South Korea	3–4	**China**	1–2	2–2 (a.e.t.)

== CAF–CONMEBOL play-off ==
The Cameroon, the African runners-up, and Chile, the South American runners-up, will compete in a home-and-away two-legged play-off for a spot in the Olympics. The draw for the order of legs was held on 31 January 2020 at the FIFA headquarters in Zürich, Switzerland. The first leg was originally to be held in Cameroon (the participating team from Africa was not known at the time of draw), while the second leg was originally to be held in Chile. The matches were originally scheduled to be played on 9 and 15 April 2020, with the second leg in Chile to take place at the Estadio Tierra de Campeones, Iquique, but were postponed on 17 March 2020 due to the COVID-19 pandemic.

After the Olympics had been postponed to July 2021, on 30 July 2020 FIFA announced the matches were rescheduled to 18 and 24 February 2021. The fixtures were to take place at the Stade Ahmadou Ahidjo, Yaoundé and Estadio Nacional, Santiago. However, FIFA announced on 4 February 2021 that the matches had been further postponed to the women's international match window in April 2021. It was confirmed on 22 March 2021 that the matches had been moved to Arslan Zeki Demirci Sports Complex, Antalya, Turkey and would be played on 10 and 13 April 2021.

Team 1	Agg.	Team 2	1st leg	2nd leg
Cameroon	1–2	**Chile**	1–2	0–0
