= 2024–25 Chelsea F.C. Women season =

Chelsea
2024–25 season
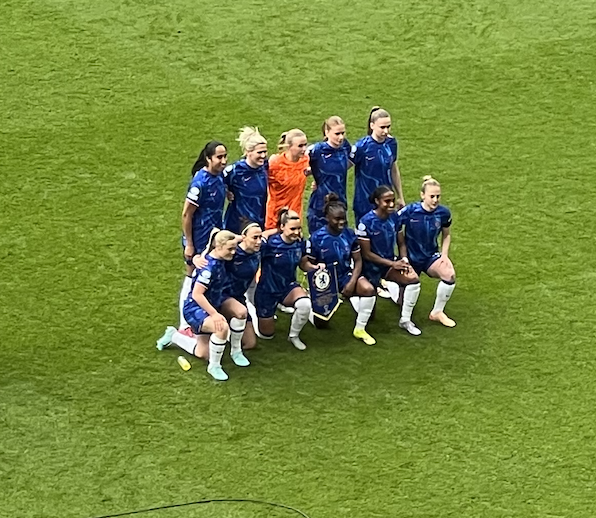
- Chairman: Adrian Jacob
- Manager: Sonia Bompastor
- Stadium: Kingsmeadow
- FA WSL: 1st
- FA Cup: Winners
- League Cup: Winners
- Champions League: Semi-final
- Top goalscorer: League: Aggie Beever-Jones (9); All: Aggie Beever-Jones (13)
- Biggest win: 7–0 (vs. Crystal Palace, 27 September 2024, WSL)
- Biggest defeat: 1–4 (vs. Barcelona, 20 April 2025, Champions League); 1–4 (vs. Barcelona, 27 April 2025, Champions League)
Home colours	Away colours	Third colours

The 2024–25 season was Chelsea Women's 33rd competitive season and 15th consecutive season in the FA Women's Super League, the top flight of English women's football. Following the departure of manager Emma Hayes at the end of the previous season, Sonia Bompastor was appointed as the new manager on 29 May 2024. Chelsea competed in the domestic league as five-time defending champions since the 2019–20 season and retained the title for the sixth consecutive time. In doing so, they also became the first WSL team to finish a 22-game season unbeaten and set a record points tally of 60 points.

Upon winning the FA Cup on 18 May 2025, Chelsea completed their second domestic treble. They had previously achieved this in the 2020–21 season.

== Squad information ==
=== First team squad ===
As of 1 March 2025

No.	Name	Nat	Since	Date of birth (age)	Signed from
Goalkeepers
1	Zećira Mušović	(Sweden)	2021	26 May 1996 (age 30)	(Sweden) Rosengård
24	Hannah Hampton	(England)	2023	16 November 2000 (age 25)	(England) Aston Villa
28	Femke Liefting	(Netherlands)	2025	2 January 2005 (age 21)	(Netherlands) AZ Alkmaar
38	Rebecca Spencer	(Jamaica)	2025	22 February 1991 (age 35)	(England) Tottenham Hotspur (loan)
40	Katie Cox	(England)	2024	28 April 2006 (age 20)	Homegrown
Defenders
4	Millie Bright (captain)	(England)	2014	21 August 1993 (age 32)	(England) Doncaster Rovers Belles
12	Ashley Lawrence	(Canada)	2023	11 June 1995 (age 31)	(France) Paris Saint-Germain
14	Nathalie Björn	(Sweden)	2024	4 May 1997 (age 29)	(England) Everton
16	Naomi Girma	(United States)	2025	14 June 2000 (age 26)	(United States) San Diego Wave FC
21	Niamh Charles	(England)	2020	21 June 1999 (age 27)	(England) Liverpool
22	Lucy Bronze	(England)	2024	28 October 1991 (age 34)	(Spain) Barcelona
25	Maelys Mpomé	(France)	2024	23 February 2003 (age 23)	(France) Montpellier
26	Kadeisha Buchanan	(Canada)	2022	5 November 1995 (age 30)	(France) Lyon
Midfielders
5	Sophie Ingle	(Wales)	2018	2 September 1991 (age 34)	(England) Liverpool
6	Sjoeke Nüsken	(Germany)	2023	22 January 2001 (age 25)	(Germany) Eintracht Frankfurt
8	Erin Cuthbert	(Scotland)	2016	19 July 1998 (age 27)	(Scotland) Glasgow City
11	Guro Reiten	(Norway)	2019	26 July 1994 (age 31)	(Norway) LSK Kvinner
18	Wieke Kaptein	(Netherlands)	2023	29 August 2005 (age 20)	(Netherlands) Twente
19	Johanna Rytting Kaneryd	(Sweden)	2022	12 February 1997 (age 29)	(Sweden) BK Häcken
27	Oriane Jean-François	(France)	2024	14 August 2001 (age 24)	(France) Paris Saint-Germain
30	Keira Walsh	(England)	2025	8 April 1997 (age 29)	(Spain) Barcelona
Forwards
2	Mia Fishel	(United States)	2023	30 April 2001 (age 25)	(Mexico) Tigres
7	Mayra Ramírez	(Colombia)	2024	23 March 1999 (age 27)	(Spain) Levante
9	Catarina Macario	(United States)	2023	4 October 1999 (age 26)	(France) Olympique Lyonnais
10	Lauren James	(England)	2021	29 September 2001 (age 24)	(England) Manchester United
17	Sandy Baltimore	(France)	2024	19 February 2000 (age 26)	(France) Paris Saint-Germain
20	Sam Kerr	(Australia)	2019	10 September 1993 (age 32)	(United States) Chicago Red Stars
23	Maika Hamano	(Japan)	2023	19 May 2004 (age 22)	(Japan) INAC Kobe Leonessa
33	Aggie Beever-Jones	(England)	2021	27 July 2003 (age 22)	Homegrown

=== New contracts ===
No.	Pos	Player/Manager	Date	Contract end	Source
20	FW	(Australia) Sam Kerr	13 June 2024	2026	
38	DF	(England) Cerys Brown	25 June 2024	2025	
—	DF	(England) Greta Humphries	9 July 2024	2025	
—	DF	(England) Jorja Fox	15 August 2024	2027	
40	GK	(England) Katie Cox	23 August 2024	2026	
—	MF	(England) Lexi Potter	31 August 2024	2028	
53	MF	(England) Lola Brown	18 November 2024	2027	
3	DF	(Netherlands) Aniek Nouwen	6 January 2025	2026	
—	MF	(England) Vera Jones	18 February 2025	2027	
4	DF	(England) Millie Bright	6 March 2025	2026	
8	MF	(Scotland) Erin Cuthbert	12 March 2025	2027	
26	DF	(Canada) Kadeisha Buchanan	15 April 2025	2027	

== Transfers and loans ==
=== In ===
Pos	Player	Transferred From	Fee	Date	Source
MF	(Spain) Júlia Bartel	(Spain) Barcelona	Free	3 July 2024	
FW	(France) Sandy Baltimore	(France) Paris Saint-Germain	Free	6 July 2024	
MF	(France) Oriane Jean-François	(France) Paris Saint-Germain	Undisclosed	16 July 2024	
DF	(England) Lucy Bronze	(Spain) Barcelona	Free	17 July 2024	
FW	(France) Louna Ribadeira	(France) Paris FC	Undisclosed	21 August 2024	
DF	(France) Maelys Mpomé	(France) Montpellier	Undisclosed	5 September 2024	
DF	(Netherlands) Veerle Buurman	(Netherlands) PSV	Undisclosed	13 September 2024	
DF	(United States) Naomi Girma	(United States) San Diego Wave FC	Undisclosed	26 January 2025	
GK	(Netherlands) Femke Liefting	(Netherlands) AZ Alkmaar	Undisclosed	31 January 2025	
MF	(England) Keira Walsh	(Spain) Barcelona	Undisclosed	31 January 2025	

=== Loan in ===
Pos	Player	From	Date	Until	Source
GK	(Jamaica) Rebecca Spencer (Note: Emergency goalkeeper loan)	(England) Tottenham Hotspur	1 March 2025	End of season	

=== Out ===
Pos	Player	Transferred To	Fee	Date	Source
DF	(England) Ria Bose	(Portugal) Sporting CP	Free	16 May 2024	
FW	(England) Fran Kirby	(England) Brighton & Hove Albion	Free	18 May 2024	
DF	(Norway) Maren Mjelde	(Norway) Arna-Bjørnar	Free	18 May 2024	
DF	(Russia) Alsu Abdullina	(Russia) Lokomotiv Moscow	Free	30 June 2024	
FW	(England) Reanna Blades	(England) Burnley	Free	30 June 2024	
MF	(Germany) Melanie Leupolz	(Spain) Real Madrid	Undisclosed	3 July 2024	
FW	(England) Amelia Ajao	(England) London City Lionesses	Undisclosed	5 July 2024	
GK	(Belgium) Nicky Evrard	(Netherlands) PSV	Undisclosed	19 July 2024	
DF	(England) Jess Carter	(United States) NJ/NY Gotham FC	Undisclosed	29 July 2024	
DF	(England) Becca Teale	(England) Lewes	Free	2 August 2024	
MF	(Czech Republic) Kateřina Svitková	(Czech Republic) Slavia Prague	Undisclosed	9 August 2024	
MF	(Serbia) Jelena Čanković	(England) Brighton & Hove Albion	Undisclosed	23 August 2024	
GK	(England) Emily Orman	(England) London City Lionesses	Undisclosed	30 August 2024	
MF	(England) Charlotte Wardlaw	(England) Newcastle United	Undisclosed	17 January 2025	
DF	(France) Ève Périsset	(France) Strasbourg	Free	31 January 2025	
DF	(England) Cerys Brown	(England) London City Lionesses	Undisclosed	6 February 2025	

=== Loan out ===
Pos	Player	To	Date	Until	Source
MF	(England) Ashanti Akpan	(England) Birmingham City	1 August 2024	End of season	
DF	(England) Greta Humphries	(England) Bristol City	8 August 2024	9 January 2025	
DF	(England) Jorja Fox	(England) Crystal Palace	15 August 2024	4 January 2025	
FW	(England) Aimee Claypole	(Sweden) Linköping FC	20 August 2024	December 2024	
FW	(France) Louna Ribadeira	(France) Paris FC	21 August 2024	7 January 2025	
DF	(England) Cerys Brown	(England) London City Lionesses	29 August 2024	6 February 2025	
MF	(England) Lexi Potter	(England) Crystal Palace	31 August 2024	End of season	
DF	(England) Brooke Aspin	(England) Crystal Palace	7 September 2024	4 January 2025	
MF	(England) Charlotte Wardlaw	(England) Sheffield United	12 September 2024	10 January 2025	
DF	(Netherlands) Veerle Buurman	(Netherlands) PSV	13 September 2024	End of season	
FW	(England) Lucy Watson	(England) Southampton	13 September 2024	10 January 2025	
FW	(England) Aimee Claypole	(England) Durham	9 January 2025	End of season	
MF	(Spain) Júlia Bartel	(England) Liverpool	9 January 2025	End of season	
DF	(England) Greta Humphries	(England) Charlton Athletic	9 January 2025	End of season	
FW	(England) Lucy Watson	(England) Ipswich Town	10 January 2025	End of season	
FW	(France) Louna Ribadeira	(England) Everton	16 January 2025	End of season	
DF	(Netherlands) Aniek Nouwen	(England) Crystal Palace	30 January 2025	End of season	
DF	(Spain) Alejandra Bernabé	(England) Liverpool	31 January 2025	End of season	

== Management team ==
Position	Staff
Manager	(France) Sonia Bompastor
Assistant manager	(England) Paul Green
Assistant coach	(France) Camille Abily
Assistant coach	(France) Theo Rivrin
Coach	(England) Gemma Davison
Goalkeeping coach	(England) Seb Brown
Assistant goalkeeping coach	(England) Dan Smith
Movement coach	(England) Harry McCulloch
Movement coach	(England) Ed Ryan-Moore
Match analyst	(England) Jamie Cook
Opposition analyst	(England) Jack Stephens
Scouting co-ordinator and academy coach	(England) TJ O'Leary

Source: Chelsea F.C.

== Pre-season ==
19 August 2024 Friendly	NJ/NY Gotham FC (United States)	1–3	(England) Chelsea	Harrison, New Jersey, United States
19:00 ET	Carter 31', (yellow card) 70'; Martin (yellow card) 65'	Report	Rytting Kaneryd 7', 15'; Beever-Jones 26', (yellow card) 64'; Bright (yellow card) 45+3'	Stadium: Red Bull Arena

25 August 2024 Friendly	Arsenal (England)	0–1	(England) Chelsea	Washington, D.C., United States
16:00 ET		Report	Baltimore 48'	Stadium: Audi Field; Attendance: 17,130

7 September 2024 Friendly	Chelsea (England)	9–0	(Netherlands) Feyenoord	Kingston upon Thames
12:00 BST	Baltimore 5'; Ramírez 8'; Nüsken 32'; Kaptein 45+3'; Bright 62'; Beever-Jones 75', 85', 90+2'; Hamano 77'	Report	Obispo (yellow card) 28' (yellow-red card) 29'	Stadium: Kingsmeadow

== Competitions ==
=== Women's Super League ===
==== League table ====
Pos	Team	Pld	W	D	L	GF	GA	GD	Pts	Qualification or relegation
1	Chelsea (C)	22	19	3	0	56	13	+43	60	Qualification for the Champions League league stage (Note: Arsenal qualified for the Champions League league phase as the 2024–25 UEFA Women's Champions League winners.)
2	Arsenal	22	15	3	4	62	26	+36	48	Qualification for the Champions League league stage
3	Manchester United	22	13	5	4	41	16	+25	44	Qualification for the Champions League second qualifying round
4	Manchester City	22	13	4	5	49	28	+21	43	
5	Brighton & Hove Albion	22	8	4	10	35	41	−6	28	

Source: The Football Association
Rules for classification: 1) Points; 2) Goal difference; 3) Number of goals scored.
(C) Champions

==== Results summary ====
Overall								Home						Away					
Pld	W	D	L	GF	GA	GD	Pts	W	D	L	GF	GA	GD	W	D	L	GF	GA	GD
22	19	3	0	56	13	+43	60	10	1	0	26	8	+18	9	2	0	30	5	+25

Last updated: 10 May 2025.
Source: FA WSL

==== Results by matchday ====
Matchday	1	2	3	4	5	6	7	8	9	10	11	12	13	14	15	16	17	18	19	20	21	22
Result	W	W	W	W	W	W	W	W	W	D	W	W	W	W	D	W	W	D	W	W	W	W
Position	4	1	2	2	2	2	1	1	1	1	1	1	1	1	1	1	1	1	1	1	1	1

Updated to match(es) played on 10 May 2025. Source: FA WSL
W = Win; D = Draw; L = Loss

==== Matches ====
20 September 2024 1	Chelsea	1–0	Aston Villa	Kingston upon Thames
19:00 BST	Rytting Kaneryd 36'; Hamano (yellow card) 90+3'	Report	Staniforth (yellow card) 4'	Stadium: Kingsmeadow; Attendance: 4,337; Referee: Kirsty Dowle

27 September 2024 2	Crystal Palace	0–7	Chelsea	Selhurst
19:30 BST	Blanchard (yellow card) 3'	Report	James (yellow card) 14', (goal) 58'; Beever-Jones 38'; Bronze 48'; Reiten 74', 90'; Björn 78'; Macario 90+5'	Stadium: Selhurst Park; Attendance: 5,003; Referee: Emily Heaslip

12 October 2024 4	Arsenal	1–2	Chelsea	Holloway
13:45 BST	Williamson (yellow card) 33'; Foord 43', (yellow card) 52'	Report	Ramírez 4'; Baltimore 16', (yellow card) 88'; Björn (yellow card) 90+1'; Cuthbert (yellow card) 90+1'	Stadium: Emirates Stadium; Attendance: 45,860; Referee: Cheryl Foster

20 October 2024 5	Chelsea	5–2	Tottenham Hotspur	Kingston upon Thames
18:45 BST	Hamano 10'; Baltimore (yellow card) 18', (goal) 74'; Hampton (yellow card) 21'; Nildén 44' (o.g.); Rytting Kaneryd 70', 90+1'; Reiten (penalty missed) 74'; Buchanan (yellow card) 83'	Report	Nildén 21'; Hunt (yellow card) 29'; Spence (yellow card) 76'; Summanen 84'	Stadium: Kingsmeadow; Attendance: 4,152; Referee: Emily Heaslip

3 November 2024 6	Everton	0–5	Chelsea	Liverpool
18:45 GMT		Report	Beever-Jones 14', (yellow card) 64'; Cuthbert 43'; Reiten 45+1'; Kaptein 82'; Lawrence 83'	Stadium: Goodison Park; Attendance: 2,109; Referee: Stacey Fullicks

10 November 2024 7	Liverpool	0–3	Chelsea	St Helens
12:30 GMT	Evans (yellow card) 34'; Smith (yellow card) 45'	Report	Ramírez 37'; Reiten 42'; Cuthbert (yellow card) 73'; Nüsken (yellow card) 86'; Beever-Jones 90'	Stadium: Totally Wicked Stadium; Attendance: 4,514; Referee: Lisa Benn

16 November 2024 8	Chelsea	2–0	Manchester City	Fulham
17:30 GMT	Björn (yellow card) 45+1'; Ramírez 75'; Reiten 79'	Report	Greenwood (yellow card) 47'	Stadium: Stamford Bridge; Attendance: 19,499; Referee: Melissa Burgin

24 November 2024 3	Chelsea	1–0	Manchester United	Kingston upon Thames
12:00 GMT	Reiten 17' (pen.); Cuthbert (yellow card) 90+6'	Report	Tullis-Joyce (yellow card) 16'; Williams (yellow card) 30'; Clinton (yellow card) 40'; Janssen (yellow card) 73'	Stadium: Kingsmeadow; Attendance: 4,264; Referee: Emily Heaslip
Note: This fixture, originally scheduled for 6 October 2024, was rescheduled due to a schedule clash with Chelsea's opening UEFA Champions League fixture on 8 October.

8 December 2024 9	Chelsea	4–2	Brighton & Hove Albion	Kingston upon Thames
14:00 GMT	Cuthbert (yellow card) 19'; Nüsken 35', 90+1', (yellow card) 90+4'; Beever-Jones 40'; Rytting Kaneryd 51'	Report	Čanković 43'; Parris (yellow card) 64'; Seike 71'; Carabalí (yellow card) 75'	Stadium: Kingsmeadow; Attendance: 3,765; Referee: Stacey Pearson

14 December 2024 10	Leicester City	1–1	Chelsea	Leicester
12:00 GMT	Goodwin 20'; Howard (yellow card) 45+1'; O'Brien (yellow card) 84'	Report	Kaptein 77'	Stadium: King Power Stadium; Attendance: 2,619; Referee: Kirsty Dowle

19 January 2025 11	West Ham United	0–5	Chelsea	Dagenham
15:00 GMT	Gorry (yellow card) 87'	Report	Macario 11'; Cuthbert 21'; Beever-Jones 44'; Baltimore 52'; Tysiak 85' (o.g.)	Stadium: Victoria Road; Referee: Amy Fearn

26 January 2025 12	Chelsea	1–0	Arsenal	Fulham
12:30 GMT	Reiten 84' (pen.); Cuthbert (yellow card) 90'	Report	McCabe (red card) 82'	Stadium: Stamford Bridge; Attendance: 34,302; Referee: Emily Heaslip

2 February 2025 13	Aston Villa	0–1	Chelsea	Aston
14:30 GMT	Baijings (yellow card) 61'; Daly (yellow card) 90+7'	Report	Mayling 82' (o.g.)	Stadium: Villa Park; Attendance: 4,324; Referee: Lisa Benn

16 February 2025 14	Chelsea	2–1	Everton	Kingston upon Thames
14:00 GMT	Ramírez 62'; James 90+3'	Report	Stenevik (yellow card) 41'; Gago 51'; Mjelde (yellow card) 57'; Brosnan (yellow card) 90+3'	Stadium: Kingsmeadow; Attendance: 3,648; Referee: Phoebe Cross

2 March 2025 15	Brighton & Hove Albion	2–2	Chelsea	Crawley
15:00 GMT	Olislagers 22'; McLauchlan (yellow card) 29'; Losada 42'	Report	Baltimore 16'; James 61', (yellow card) 90+10'	Stadium: Broadfield Stadium; Attendance: 4,490; Referee: Kirsty Dowle

5 March 2025 16	Chelsea	3–1	Leicester City	Kingston upon Thames
19:30 GMT	Macario 8'; Beever-Jones 51'; Cuthbert 86'	Report	Mace (yellow card) 7'; O'Brien (yellow card) 44'; Momiki 55'; Nevin (yellow card) 82'	Stadium: Kingsmeadow; Attendance: 2,692; Referee: Abigail Byrne
Note: This fixture, originally scheduled for 16 March 2025, was rescheduled due to Chelsea's participation in the 2025 League Cup final.

23 March 2025 17	Manchester City	1–2	Chelsea	Manchester
14:30 GMT	Kerolin 32'	Report	Jean-François (yellow card) 33'; Bright (yellow card) 41'; Beever-Jones 49'; Cuthbert 90+1'	Stadium: City of Manchester Stadium; Attendance: 11,302; Referee: Kirsty Dowle

30 March 2025 18	Chelsea	2–2	West Ham United	Kingston upon Thames
16:30 BST	Hamano 16'; Beever-Jones 21'; Lawrence (yellow card) 78'	Report	Martinez 42', 90+1'; Tysiak (yellow card) 60'	Stadium: Kingsmeadow; Attendance: 3,608; Referee: Abigail Byrne

23 April 2025 19	Chelsea	4–0	Crystal Palace	Kingston upon Thames
19:15 BST	Reiten 22' (pen.); Macario 24', 49'; Fishel 64'	Report	Cato (yellow card) 35'; Swaby (red card) 47'; Gejl (yellow card) 48'	Stadium: Kingsmeadow; Attendance: 1,509; Referee: Grace Lowe
Note: This fixture, originally scheduled for 20 April 2025, was rescheduled due to Chelsea's participation in the UEFA Champions League semi-finals.

30 April 2025 20	Manchester United	0–1	Chelsea	Leigh
20:15 BST	Malard (yellow card) 48'	Report	Bronze 74'	Stadium: Leigh Sports Village; Attendance: 4,029; Referee: Abigail Byrne
Note: This fixture, originally scheduled for 27 April 2025, was rescheduled due to Chelsea's participation in the UEFA Champions League semi-finals.

4 May 2025 21	Tottenham Hotspur	0–1	Chelsea	Tottenham
14:00 BST	Hunt (yellow card) 48'	Report	Macario 35' (pen.); Kaptein (yellow card) 60'; Nüsken (yellow card) 70'	Stadium: Tottenham Hotspur Stadium; Attendance: 9,999; Referee: Melissa Burgin

10 May 2025 22	Chelsea	1–0	Liverpool	Fulham
12:30 BST	Bronze (yellow card) 62'; Beever-Jones 90+1'	Report	Höbinger (yellow card) 40'	Stadium: Stamford Bridge; Attendance: 21,327; Referee: Phoebe Cross

=== FA Cup ===
12 January 2025 Fourth round proper	Chelsea	4–0	Charlton Athletic	Kingston upon Thames
15:00 GMT	Ramírez 40'; Reiten 45+3' (pen.); Beever-Jones 48'; Charles 73'	Report	O'Rourke (yellow card) 90+3'	Stadium: Kingsmeadow; Referee: Joanne Horwood

9 February 2025 Fifth round proper	Chelsea	4–1	Everton	Kingston upon Thames
15:00 GMT	Macario 36' (pen.); Ramírez 45+2'; Hamano 71'; Baltimore 90+2' (pen.)	Report	S. Holmgaard 17'	Stadium: Kingsmeadow; Attendance: 1,974; Referee: Amy Fearn

9 March 2025 Quarter-final	Chelsea	1–0	Crystal Palace	Kingston upon Thames
14:30 GMT	James 64'	Report	Gibbons (yellow card) 41'; Yanez (yellow card) 53'; Woodham (yellow card) 76'; Sharpe (yellow card) 90+7'	Stadium: Kingsmeadow; Attendance: 2,266; Referee: Amy Fearn

12 April 2025 Semi-final	Chelsea	2–1	Liverpool	Kingston upon Thames
12:15 BST	Cuthbert 45+2'; Baltimore (yellow card) 77'; Beever-Jones 90+4'	Report	Smith 21'; Fisk (yellow card) 37'; Laws (yellow card) 74'	Stadium: Kingsmeadow; Attendance: 2,886; Referee: Kirsty Dowle

18 May 2025 Final	Chelsea	3–0	Manchester United	London
13:30 BST	Baltimore 45' (pen.), 90+1', (yellow card) 90'; Cuthbert (yellow card) 56'; Macario 84'	Report	Galton (yellow card) 50'; Clinton (yellow card) 53'; George (yellow card) 72'	Stadium: Wembley Stadium; Attendance: 74,412; Referee: Stacey Fullicks

=== League Cup ===
==== Knockout phase ====
22 January 2025 Quarter-final	Chelsea	5–0	Durham	Kingston upon Thames
18:45 GMT	Beever-Jones 21'; Jean-François 61'; Cuthbert 73'; Reiten 75'; Hamano 77'	Report	Wilson (yellow card) 22'	Stadium: Kingsmeadow; Attendance: 1,243; Referee: Kirsty Dowle

5 February 2025 Semi-final	Chelsea	2–0	West Ham United	Kingston upon Thames
19:00 GMT	Rytting Kaneryd 20'; Lawrence (yellow card) 27'; Nüsken 29'; James (yellow card) 82'	Report	Ueki (yellow card) 75'	Stadium: Kingsmeadow; Attendance: 1,455; Referee: Stacey Pearson

15 March 2025 Final	Chelsea	2–1	Manchester City	Derby
12:15 GMT	Ramírez 8'; Bronze (yellow card) 50'; Hasegawa 77' (o.g.)	Report	Miedema (yellow card) 43'; Shaw (yellow card) 57'; Fujino 64'	Stadium: Pride Park Stadium; Attendance: 14,187; Referee: Emily Heaslip

=== UEFA Women's Champions League ===
==== Group stage ====
Chelsea were drawn into Group B alongside Real Madrid, Twente and Celtic.

Pos	Team	Pld	W	D	L	GF	GA	GD	Pts	Qualification	CHE	RMA	TWE	CEL
1	(England) Chelsea	6	6	0	0	19	6	+13	18	Advance to quarter-finals	—	3–2	6–1	3–0
2	(Spain) Real Madrid	6	4	0	2	20	7	+13	12	Advance to quarter-finals	1–2	—	7–0	4–0
3	(Netherlands) Twente	6	2	0	4	9	19	−10	6		1–3	2–3	—	3–0
4	(Scotland) Celtic	6	0	0	6	1	17	−16	0		1–2	0–3	0–2	—

Source: UEFA
Rules for classification: Group stage tiebreakers

8 October 2024 1	Chelsea (England)	3–2	(Spain) Real Madrid	Fulham
20:00 BST	Nüsken 2'; Reiten 27' (pen.); Ramírez 53'	Report	Redondo 39'; Abelleira (yellow card) 61'; Caicedo 84'	Stadium: Stamford Bridge; Attendance: 3,832; Referee: Ivana Martinčić (Croatia)

17 October 2024 2	Twente (Netherlands)	1–3	(England) Chelsea	Enschede
21:00 CEST	Van Dijk 68'	Report	Beever-Jones 7'; Hamano 18'; Reiten 63' (pen.)	Stadium: De Grolsch Veste; Attendance: 4,000; Referee: Maria Sole Ferrieri Caputi (Italy)

13 November 2024 3	Celtic (Scotland)	1–2	(England) Chelsea	Glasgow
21:00 GMT	Agnew 22'; Cross (yellow card) 77'; Lawton (yellow card) 87'	Report	Hamano 28'; Lawrence 32'; Beever-Jones (yellow card) 82' (yellow-red card) 90+5'; Kaptein (yellow card) 89'	Stadium: Celtic Park; Attendance: 7,390; Referee: Hristiyana Guteva (Bulgaria)

20 November 2024 4	Chelsea (England)	3–0	(Scotland) Celtic	Fulham
20:00 GMT	Bronze 2'; Kaptein 25'; Périsset 90+5' (pen.)	Report		Stadium: Stamford Bridge; Attendance: 3,931; Referee: Tess Olofsson (Sweden)

11 December 2024 5	Chelsea (England)	6–1	(Netherlands) Twente	Fulham
20:00 GMT	Macario 2'; Hamano (yellow card) 28'; Jean-François 30'; Ramírez 35'; Knol 38' (o.g.); Nüsken 47'; Périsset 85'	Report	Van Dooren 29' (pen.)	Stadium: Stamford Bridge; Attendance: 10,500; Referee: Riem Hussein (Germany)

17 December 2024 6	Real Madrid (Spain)	1–2	(England) Chelsea	Madrid
18:45 CET	Weir 7'	Report	Macario 51' (pen.), 56' (pen.); Cuthbert (yellow card) 61'; Baltimore (yellow card) 83'	Stadium: Alfredo Di Stéfano Stadium; Attendance: 2,057; Referee: Maria Sole Ferrieri Caputi (Italy)

==== Quarter-finals ====
19 March 2025 First leg	Manchester City (England)	2–0	(England) Chelsea	Manchester
20:00 GMT	Miedema 60', 88'; Kerolin (yellow card) 77'	Report		Stadium: Academy Stadium; Attendance: 4,094; Referee: Désirée Grundbacher (Switzerland)

27 March 2025 Second leg	Chelsea (England)	3–0 (3–2 agg.)	(England) Manchester City	Fulham
20:00 GMT	Baltimore 14', (yellow card) 55'; Björn 38'; Ramírez 43'; Walsh (yellow card) 90+2'	Report	Aleixandri (yellow card) 46'	Stadium: Stamford Bridge; Attendance: 10,769; Referee: Catarina Campos (Portugal)

==== Semi-finals ====
20 April 2025 First leg	Barcelona (Spain)	4–1	(England) Chelsea	Sant Joan Despí
18:00 CEST	Putellas (penalty missed) 12'; Pajor 35'; Pina 70', 90', (yellow card) 77'; Paredes 82'	Report	Ramírez (yellow card) 41'; Macario (yellow card) 72'; Baltimore 74'	Stadium: Johan Cruyff Stadium; Attendance: 5,750; Referee: Katalin Kulcsár (Hungary)

27 April 2025 Second leg	Chelsea (England)	1–4 (2–8 agg.)	(Spain) Barcelona	Fulham
14:00 BST	Kaptein 90+1'	Report	Bonmatí 25'; Pajor 41'; Pina 43'; Paralluelo 90'	Stadium: Stamford Bridge; Attendance: 23,573; Referee: Tess Olofsson (Sweden)

== Statistics ==
=== Appearances and goals ===
As of 18 May 2025

No.	Pos	Nat	Player	Total		WSL		FA Cup		League Cup		Champions League	
No.	Pos	Nat	Player	Apps	Goals	Apps	Goals	Apps	Goals	Apps	Goals	Apps	Goals
Goalkeepers:
1	GK	(Sweden) SWE	Zećira Mušović	6	0	0	0	0	0	1	0	5	0
24	GK	(England) ENG	Hannah Hampton	34	0	22	0	5	0	2	0	5	0
28	GK	(Netherlands) NED	Femke Liefting	0	0	0	0	0	0	0	0	0	0
38	GK	(Jamaica) JAM	Rebecca Spencer	0	0	0	0	0	0	0	0	0	0
40	GK	(England) ENG	Katie Cox	0	0	0	0	0	0	0	0	0	0
Defenders:
4	DF	(England) ENG	Millie Bright	36	0	21	0	5	0	2	0	8	0
12	DF	(Canada) CAN	Ashley Lawrence	30	2	11+8	1	2	0	2	0	3+4	1
14	DF	(Sweden) SWE	Nathalie Björn	32	2	11+5	1	5	0	3	0	8	1
16	DF	(United States) USA	Naomi Girma	8	0	4+1	0	1	0	0	0	1+1	0
21	DF	(England) ENG	Niamh Charles	22	1	9+3	0	2+2	1	2+1	0	3	0
22	DF	(England) ENG	Lucy Bronze	31	3	16+3	2	3	0	1	0	7+1	1
25	DF	(France) FRA	Maelys Mpomé	10	0	2+3	0	0	0	1	0	2+2	0
26	DF	(Canada) CAN	Kadeisha Buchanan	6	0	5	0	0	0	0	0	1	0
Midfielders:
5	MF	(Wales) WAL	Sophie Ingle	0	0	0	0	0	0	0	0	0	0
6	MF	(Germany) GER	Sjoeke Nüsken	36	5	18+3	2	0+5	0	3	1	4+3	2
8	MF	(Scotland) SCO	Erin Cuthbert	34	6	14+4	4	5	1	1+1	1	7+2	0
11	MF	(Norway) NOR	Guro Reiten	29	12	13+4	8	1+2	1	2	1	3+4	2
18	MF	(Netherlands) NED	Wieke Kaptein	33	4	8+8	2	2+2	0	0+3	0	7+3	2
19	MF	(Sweden) SWE	Johanna Rytting Kaneryd	36	5	16+5	4	2+2	0	3	1	6+2	0
27	MF	(France) FRA	Oriane Jean-François	22	2	5+6	0	1+2	0	1+1	1	4+2	1
30	MF	(England) ENG	Keira Walsh	15	0	4+3	0	3	0	1	0	4	0
Forwards:
2	FW	(United States) USA	Mia Fishel	4	1	1+3	1	0	0	0	0	0	0
7	FW	(Colombia) COL	Mayra Ramírez	33	10	12+5	4	4+1	2	2	1	7+2	3
9	FW	(United States) USA	Catarina Macário	32	11	8+10	6	3+2	2	1+1	0	3+4	3
10	FW	(England) ENG	Lauren James	17	4	6+3	3	3	1	1+1	0	3	0
17	FW	(France) FRA	Sandy Baltimore	29	9	14+1	4	4+1	3	1	0	7+1	2
20	FW	(Australia) AUS	Sam Kerr	0	0	0	0	0	0	0	0	0	0
23	FW	(Japan) JPN	Maika Hamano	30	6	10+7	2	1+2	1	2+1	1	3+4	2
33	FW	(England) ENG	Aggie Beever-Jones	39	13	12+10	9	3+2	2	1+2	1	6+3	1
53	FW	(England) ENG	Lola Brown	3	0	0+1	0	0	0	0	0	0+2	0
Players away from the club on loan:
16	MF	(Spain) ESP	Júlia Bartel	2	0	0	0	0	0	0	0	0+2	0
28	DF	(Spain) ESP	Alejandra Bernabé	2	0	0+1	0	0	0	0+1	0	0	0
Players who appeared for the club but left during the season:
15	DF	(France) FRA	Ève Périsset	7	2	0+2	0	0	0	0+1	0	3+1	2

- Source: Chelsea F.C.

=== Goalscorers ===
Includes all competitive matches. The list is sorted by squad number when total goals are equal.

As of 18 May 2025

Rank	Pos.	No.	Player	FA WSL	FA Cup	League Cup	Champions League	Total
1	FW	33	(England) Aggie Beever-Jones	9	2	1	1	13
2	MF	11	(Norway) Guro Reiten	8	1	1	2	12
3	FW	9	(United States) Catarina Macario	6	2	0	3	11
4	FW	7	(Colombia) Mayra Ramírez	4	2	1	3	10
5	FW	17	(France) Sandy Baltimore	4	3	0	2	9
6	MF	8	(Scotland) Erin Cuthbert	4	1	1	0	6
6	FW	23	(Japan) Maika Hamano	2	1	1	2	6
8	MF	6	(Germany) Sjoeke Nüsken	2	0	1	2	5
8	MF	19	(Sweden) Johanna Rytting Kaneryd	4	0	1	0	5
10	FW	10	(England) Lauren James	3	1	0	0	4
10	MF	18	(Netherlands) Wieke Kaptein	2	0	0	2	4
12	DF	22	(England) Lucy Bronze	2	0	0	1	3
13	DF	12	(Canada) Ashley Lawrence	1	0	0	1	2
13	DF	14	(Sweden) Nathalie Björn	1	0	0	1	2
13	DF	15	(France) Ève Périsset	0	0	0	2	2
13	MF	27	(France) Oriane Jean-François	0	0	1	1	2
17	FW	2	(United States) Mia Fishel	1	0	0	0	1
17	DF	21	(England) Niamh Charles	0	1	0	0	1
Own goal(s)				3	0	1	1	5
Total				56	14	9	24	103

=== Clean sheets ===
Includes all competitive matches. The list is sorted by squad number when total clean sheets are equal.

As of 18 May 2025

Rank	Pos.	No.	Player	FA WSL	FA Cup	League Cup	Champions League	Total
1	GK	24	(England) Hannah Hampton	13	3	1	1	18
2	GK	1	(Sweden) Zećira Mušović	0	0	1	1	2
Total				13	3	2	2	20

=== Disciplinary records ===
Includes all competitive matches. The list is sorted by squad number when total clean sheets are equal.

As of 18 May 2025

Pos.	No.	Name	FA WSL			FA Cup			League Cup			Champions League			Total		
Pos.	No.	Name	Booked	(yellow card) (yellow-red card)	Sent off (straight red)	Booked	(yellow card) (yellow-red card)	Sent off (straight red)	Booked	(yellow card) (yellow-red card)	Sent off (straight red)	Booked	(yellow card) (yellow-red card)	Sent off (straight red)	Booked	(yellow card) (yellow-red card)	Sent off (straight red)
DF	4	(England) Millie Bright	1	0	0	0	0	0	0	0	0	0	0	0	1	0	0
MF	6	(Germany) Sjoeke Nüsken	3	0	0	0	0	0	0	0	0	0	0	0	3	0	0
FW	7	(Colombia) Mayra Ramírez	0	0	0	0	0	0	0	0	0	1	0	0	1	0	0
MF	8	(Scotland) Erin Cuthbert	5	0	0	1	0	0	0	0	0	1	0	0	7	0	0
FW	9	(United States) Catarina Macario	0	0	0	0	0	0	0	0	0	1	0	0	1	0	0
FW	10	(England) Lauren James	2	0	0	0	0	0	1	0	0	0	0	0	3	0	0
DF	12	(Canada) Ashley Lawrence	1	0	0	0	0	0	1	0	0	0	0	0	2	0	0
DF	14	(Sweden) Nathalie Björn	2	0	0	0	0	0	0	0	0	0	0	0	2	0	0
FW	17	(France) Sandy Baltimore	2	0	0	2	0	0	0	0	0	2	0	0	6	0	0
MF	18	(Netherlands) Wieke Kaptein	1	0	0	0	0	0	0	0	0	1	0	0	2	0	0
DF	22	(England) Lucy Bronze	1	0	0	0	0	0	1	0	0	0	0	0	2	0	0
FW	23	(Japan) Maika Hamano	1	0	0	0	0	0	0	0	0	1	0	0	2	0	0
GK	24	(England) Hannah Hampton	1	0	0	0	0	0	0	0	0	0	0	0	1	0	0
DF	26	(Canada) Kadeisha Buchanan	1	0	0	0	0	0	0	0	0	0	0	0	1	0	0
MF	27	(France) Oriane Jean-François	1	0	0	0	0	0	0	0	0	0	0	0	1	0	0
MF	30	(England) Keira Walsh	0	0	0	0	0	0	0	0	0	1	0	0	1	0	0
FW	33	(England) Aggie Beever-Jones	1	0	0	0	0	0	0	0	0	0	1	0	1	1	0
Total			23	0	0	3	0	0	3	0	0	8	1	0	37	1	0

== Results by team ==
Team	Pld	W	D	L	GF	GA	GD	WPCT
(England) Arsenal	3	3	0	0	4	1	+3	100.00
(England) Aston Villa	2	2	0	0	2	0	+2	100.00
(Spain) Barcelona	2	0	0	2	2	8	−6	0.00
(England) Brighton & Hove Albion	2	1	1	0	6	4	+2	50.00
(Scotland) Celtic	2	2	0	0	5	1	+4	100.00
(England) Charlton Athletic	1	1	0	0	4	0	+4	100.00
(England) Crystal Palace	3	3	0	0	12	0	+12	100.00
(England) Durham	1	1	0	0	5	0	+5	100.00
(England) Everton	3	3	0	0	11	2	+9	100.00
(Netherlands) Feyenoord	1	1	0	0	9	0	+9	100.00
(England) Leicester City	2	1	1	0	4	2	+2	50.00
(England) Liverpool	3	3	0	0	6	1	+5	100.00
(England) Manchester City	5	4	0	1	9	4	+5	80.00
(England) Manchester United	3	3	0	0	5	0	+5	100.00
(United States) NJ/NY Gotham	1	1	0	0	3	1	+2	100.00
(Spain) Real Madrid	2	2	0	0	5	3	+2	100.00
(England) Tottenham Hotspur	2	2	0	0	6	2	+4	100.00
(Netherlands) Twente	2	2	0	0	9	2	+7	100.00
(England) West Ham United	3	2	1	0	9	2	+7	66.67
Total	43	37	3	3	116	33	+83	86.05

Updated to match(es) played on 18 May 2025. Source: Preseason and competitions
