= Aggie Beever-Jones =

English footballer (born 2003)

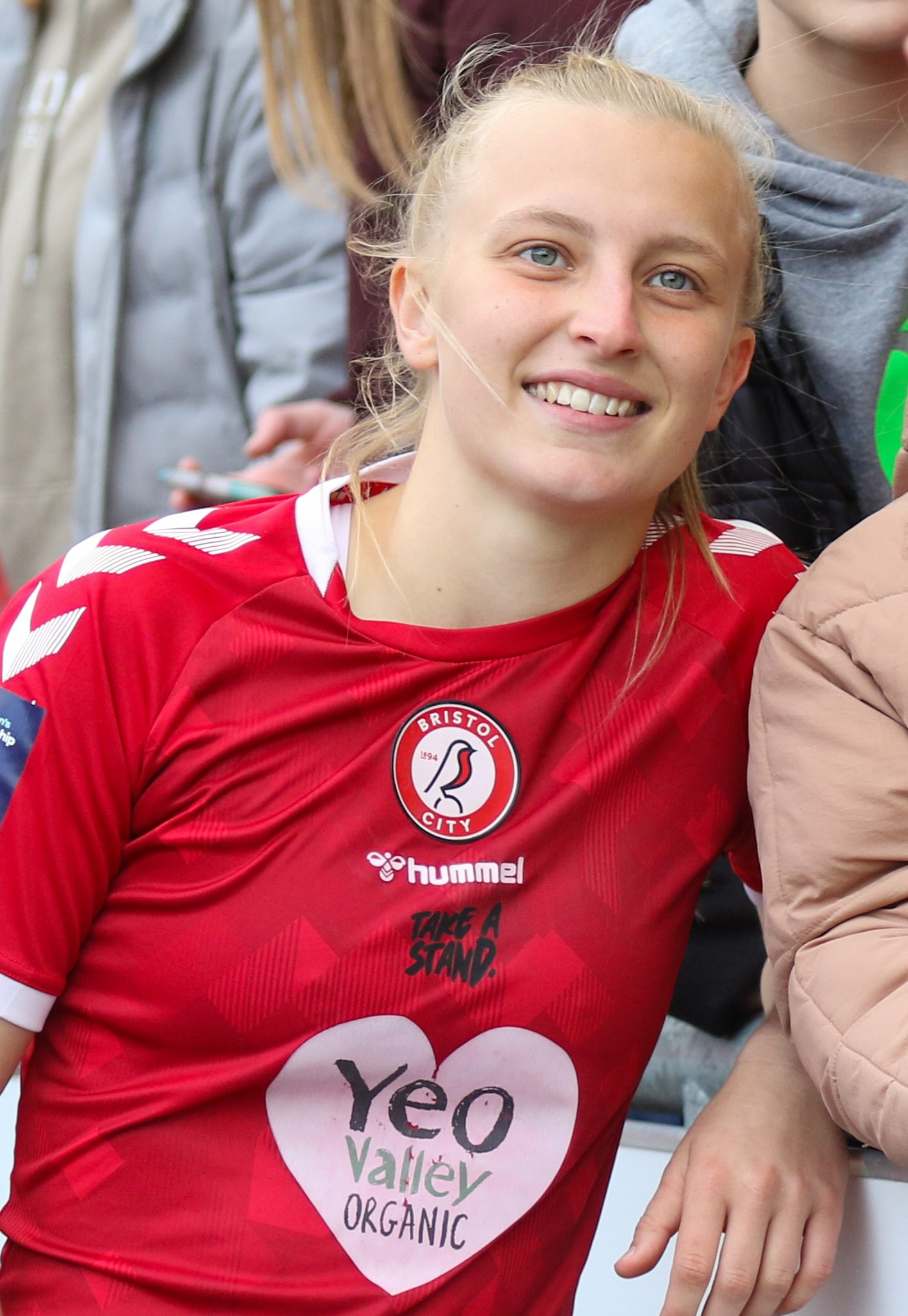
- Beever-Jones with Bristol City in 2022.

Personal information
- Full name: Agnes Beever-Jones
- Date of birth: 27 July 2003 (age 23)
- Place of birth: Carshalton, England
- Height: 1.73 m (5 ft 8 in)
- Position: Forward

Team information
- Current team: Chelsea
- Number: 33

Youth career
- 2012–2021: Chelsea

Senior career*
Years	Team	Apps	(Gls)
2021–	Chelsea	67	(25)
2021–2022	→ Bristol City (loan)	22	(5)
2022–2023	→ Everton (loan)	16	(2)

International career^{‡}
2017	England U15		
2019–2021	England U17	6	(2)
2021–2022	England U19	10	(8)
2022–	England U23	16	(3)
2024–	England	16	(7)
Medal record
Women's football
Representing England
UEFA Women's Championship
Winner	2025 Switzerland
- * Club domestic league appearances and goals as of 21 November 2026 ‡ National team caps and goals as of 3 March 2026

Agnes "Aggie" Beever-Jones (born 27 July 2003) is an English professional footballer who plays as a forward for Women's Super League club Chelsea and the England national team. She previously played on loan at Bristol City and Everton, and has represented England from under-15 youth level. She was part of the England squad which won UEFA Euro 2025 and scored her debut major tournament goal against Wales during the tournament.

== Early life ==
Beever-Jones grew up in Surrey, near Chelsea's Cobham Training Centre. Her grandfather, a "die-hard Chelsea fan", would take her to Stamford Bridge, sparking her interest in football. Prior to becoming an attacking player, she began as a goalkeeper in a local league boys team. Beever-Jones says she was initially rejected by the Chelsea academy, before being accepted a year later aged 9–10.

== Club career ==
=== Chelsea ===
==== 2020–21 ====
A product of the Chelsea academy, Beever-Jones was offered a professional contract at 18 years old, describing it as a "dream come true". She made her senior debut for the Blues in a 4–0 away win over Aston Villa at Banks's Stadium on 27 January 2021. On 16 April, she was handed her first start in a 5–0 home victory against the London City Lionesses in the fourth round of the 2020–21 FA Cup, which Chelsea would go on to win that season to complete a domestic treble.

==== 2021–22 Bristol City (loan) ====
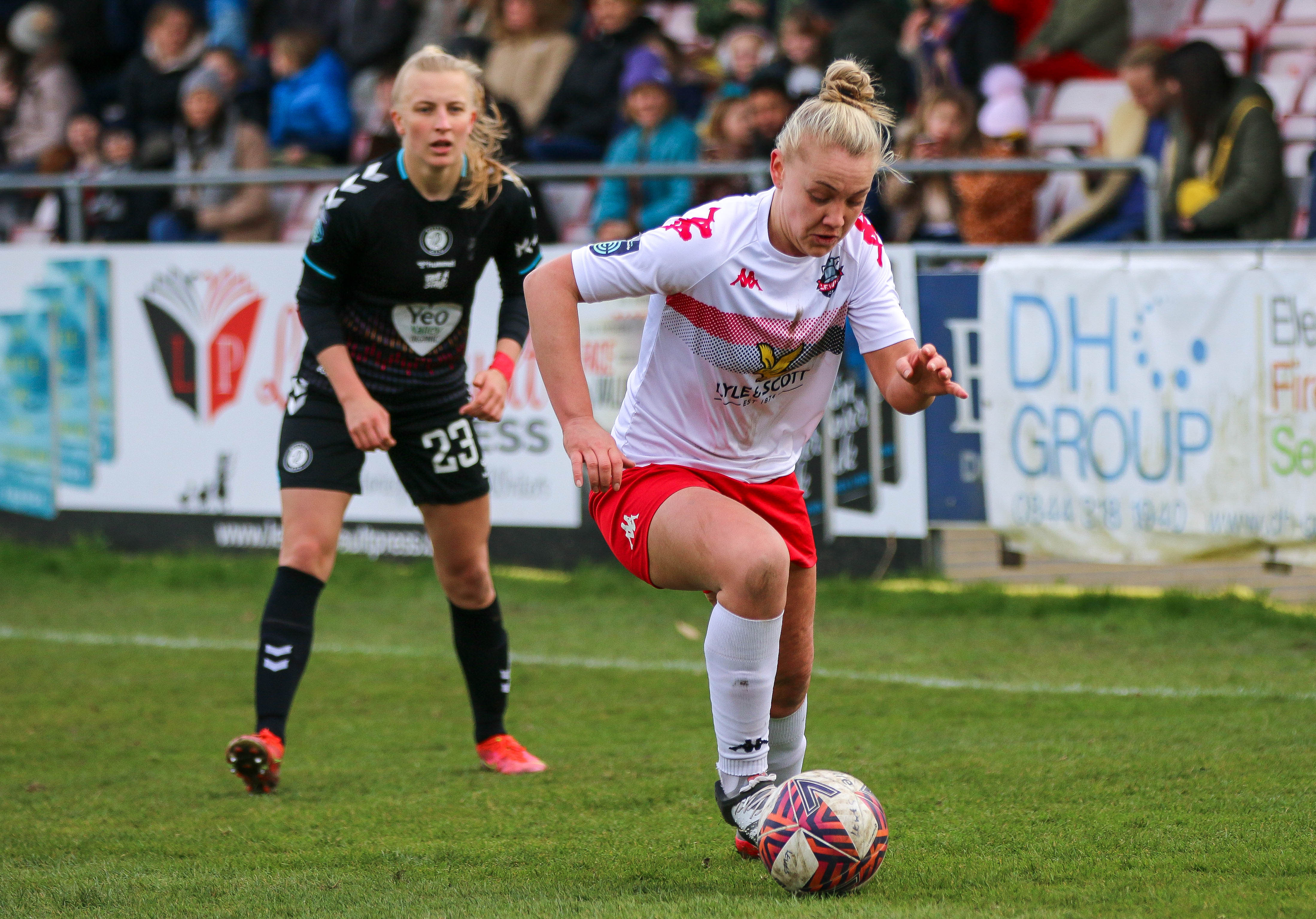
Beever-Jones (left) playing for Bristol City against Lewes, 2022.

On 19 August 2021, Beever-Jones was loaned out to Bristol City for the 2021–22 Championship, describing the move as a great opportunity to "develop my all-round game in a competitive league". She came off the bench on the opening day to score a late consolation goal in a 4–3 loss to Crystal Palace.

On 15 November 2021, Beever-Jones scored the final goal in the 3–0 win over Blackburn Rovers at Ashton Gate, that was later nominated for FA Women's Championship Goal of the Season.

City manager Lauren Smith has since discussed Beever-Jones' development at the club, describing her as a "phenomenal talent", who she hopes will continue to grow as a player. Beever-Jones has said she felt trusted by the club, that helped in many ways, "both on and off the pitch".

==== 2022–23 Everton (loan) ====
In August 2022 Beever-Jones signed for Everton on a season-long loan, describing the club as being "the perfect place". Everton Manager Brian Sørensen said he considered the winger to be one of England's rising stars. On 18 September, Beever-Jones started as a forward in the Toffees' opening game of the 2022–23 WSL season.

On 22 January 2023, she scored a superb third goal against West Ham in a 3–0 victory, that was later voted as Everton's Goal of the Month for January. On 2 April, Beever-Jones scored her second WSL goal, a late winner in the fourth minute of injury time, to beat Tottenham Hotspur 2–1.

On 17 May 2023, Beever-Jones received her first red card in her professional career, for a late challenge on Arsenal's midfielder Lia Wälti, who was subsequently stretchered off the pitch. Afterwards, she apologised for the tackle and was defended by Wälti on social media.

Beever-Jones ended the season with 3 goals in 21 appearances. She said she worked on her defensive abilities at Everton, being an area of the game she needed to improve on.

==== 2023–24 ====
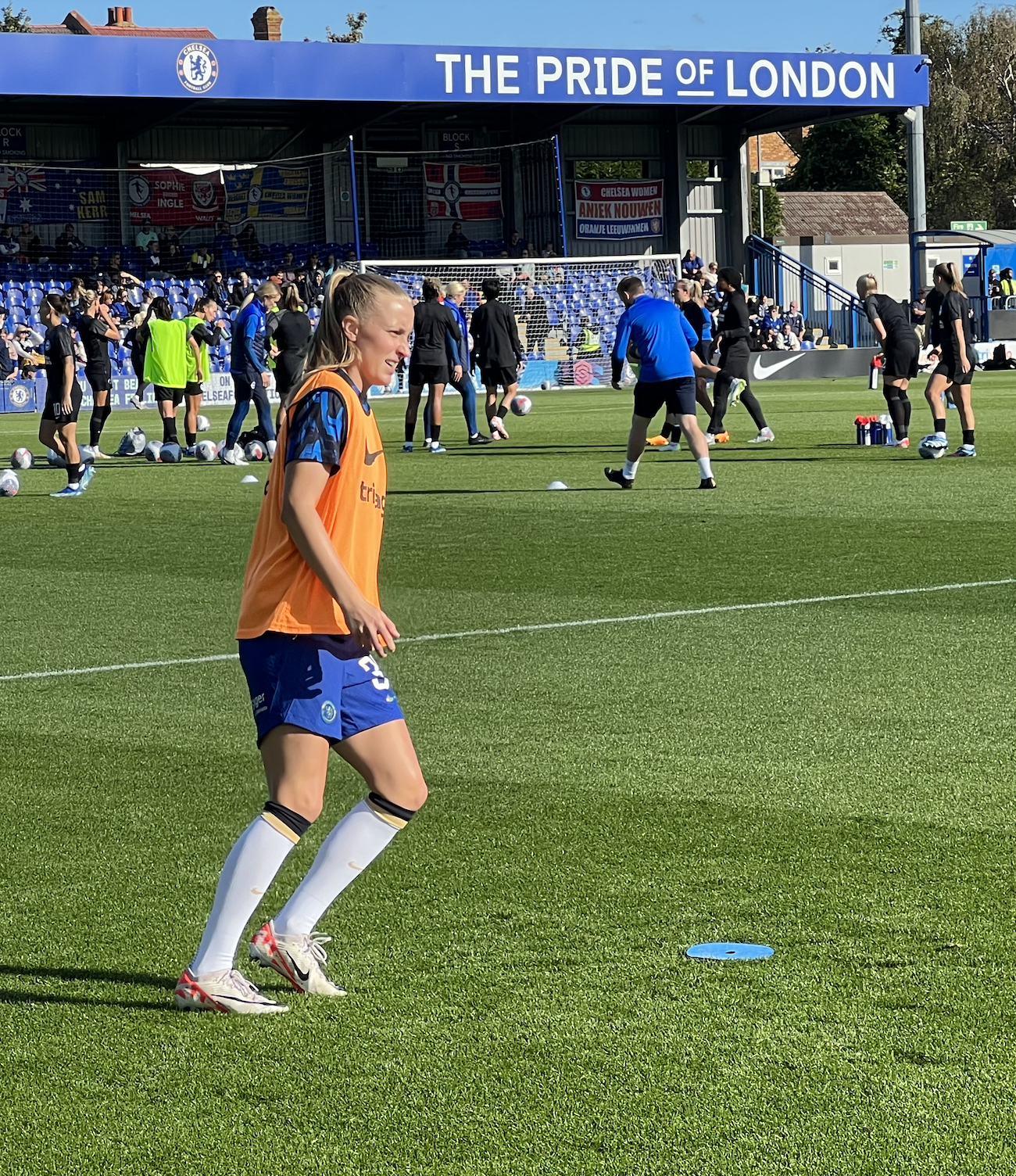
Beever-Jones warming up at Kingsmeadow in October 2023.

For the 2023–24 season Beever-Jones returned to the Chelsea squad, with manager Emma Hayes commenting, "She went on loan deals as an academy player and came back as a first-team player". Beever-Jones claims "the opportunity presented itself with players leaving, like Pernille [Harder]."

On Saturday the 14th of October 2023, she came on as a substitute for Sam Kerr in the match against West Ham. In Chelsea's next game a 4–2 win against Brighton & Hove Albion, she scored her first WSL goal for the club. In each of Chelsea's following four league matches in November she scored goals, including in her first match at Chelsea's main stadium Stamford Bridge, as well as first WSL start of the season against Liverpool. Beever-Jones later said scoring at Stamford Bridge was "an absolute dream", and would subsequently be nominated for the WSL Player of the Month for November, that was won by teammate Lauren James. On 14 December 2023, she made her first appearance in the UEFA Champions League in the match against BK Häcken, that ended in a 0–0 draw.

Sky Sports partly attributed her increased game time to injuries to Chelsea winger Guro Reiten and striker Fran Kirby, having played the majority of the first seven WSL games of the season. She has been dubbed "the super sub" by fans, with four of her first five goals coming from the bench.

In January 2024 she signed a new contract with Chelsea until the summer of 2026, with an option to extend the deal a further year, having scored 6 goals in 12 appearances during the 2023–24 season. She provided an assist for Catarina Macario in the 1–0 victory over Everton in the FA Cup.

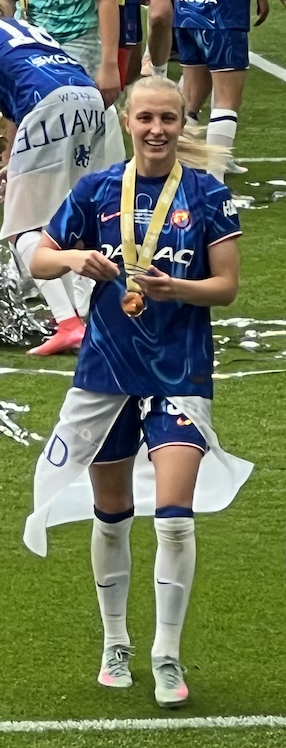
Beever-Jones with her FA Cup winner's medal in May 2025.

After losing the League Cup to Arsenal and the semi-final of the FA Cup to Manchester United, Beever-Jones said their cup losses "are not the Chelsea way". On April 27 Beever-Jones played in front of a record breaking crowd of 39,398 at Stamford Bridge, in their 0–2 defeat in the semi-final of the Champions League against Barcelona.

In the final home game of the 2023–24 season, Beever-Jones scored twice in the 8–0 win over Bristol City, including the final goal to put Chelsea 1 goal ahead of Manchester City on goal differential for the title race. She ended the season ranked shared fifth on the WSL top scorers list, with 11 goals and the best minutes per goal ratio of all players having scored at least five times.

==== 2024–25 ====
Beever-Jones began the 2024–25 season scoring in all her first three starts for Chelsea. In the 7–0 victory over Crystal Palace where she scored the opening goal, Goal.com described her as stealing the show as the best performing player.

Having scored her debut UEFA Champions League goal against Twente on 17 October 2024 in a 2024–25 league group stage match, she was sent off in injury time against Celtic after a second yellow card, as Chelsea led 2–1 on 13 November 2024.

==== 2025–26 ====
On 5 September 2025, Beever-Jones scored the 31st-minute opening goal of the 2025–26 season off a cross from debutant Ellie Carpenter, where Chelsea won 2–1 over Manchester City. Her 28 September 2025 free-kick goal in a 4–0 victory over West Ham was named as Chelsea's goal of the month. Having scored in each of Chelsea's opening four matches of the season, she was named as the club's Player of the Month for September. She scored the second goal in Chelsea's 2–0 victory over Manchester United in the 2025–26 Women's League Cup final on 15 March 2026.

In May 2026, Beever-Jones played for Chelsea in their debut appearance at World Sevens Football. She recorded 8 goals and 5 assists across the 5-game seven-a-side competition, including a last minute winner against Manchester United to secure the title for Chelsea. Her performance led her to receive both the Golden Ball and the Golden Boot. On 6 July, it was announced that Beever-Jones had signed a new contract to keep her at Chelsea until 2030. The striker kicked a hat-trick, within 13 minutes, in a friendly pre-season away game against Auckland FC Invitational XI on 8 August to help Chelsea win 7–0 against the Auckland home side.

== International career ==
=== Youth ===
Beever-Jones has represented England at multiple youth levels, from under-15 up to under-23.

In October 2019, she was named in the under-17 squad for the first round of the 2020 U-17 Championship qualifiers. She played against Croatia, Bosnia and Herzegovina and Belgium, and scored once against Bosnia. with the tournament cancelled due to the COVID-19 pandemic.

In October 2021, Beever-Jones was named in under-19 squad for the first round of the 2022 Under-19 Championship qualification, making her debut against Republic of Ireland on 20 October, and scoring the final goal in the 8–1 victory over Northern Ireland on 23 October. On 9 April 2022, in round 2, she scored the opening goal in a 2–0 win against Iceland, followed by a hat-trick against Belgium on 12 April. With England qualifying for the 2022 Under-19 Championship, Beever-Jones scored two goals against Norway in a 2–0 victory in the group stage on 22 June.

On 21 September 2023, in the under-23 squad, Beever-Jones scored in a 1–1 draw against Norway in the inaugural U23 European League. On 25 September, she scored another goal in the competition against Belgium in a 3–0 victory. In October, she was again named in the squad for U23 European League matches against Italy and Portugal. In November, England's senior team manager, Sarina Wiegman, considered Beever-Jones' inclusion in the senior team as premature, but hoping that "she just keeps improving and gives us headaches again with our selection".

=== Senior ===
Beever-Jones received her first senior call-up on 14 May 2024 for the four UEFA Euro 2025 qualification matches played that summer. She made her senior debut on 12 July, coming on as an 89th-minute substitute in a 2–1 win against the Republic of Ireland. Beever-Jones has been awarded Legacy number 231 by The Football Association.

On 4 April 2025, Beever-Jones scored her first senior international goal in a 5–0 UEFA Nations League victory against Belgium. A month later, she scored her first senior hat-trick in a 6–0 victory against Portugal on 30 May, becoming the second England women's player to score a Wembley hat-trick after Beth Mead. On 6 June, she was named in England's squad for UEFA Euro 2025. She was brought on 85 minutes into England's semi-final victory over Italy, and on her 22nd birthday was an unused substitute in the tournament's final, where they beat Spain 1–1 (3–1 on penalties).

== Personal life ==
Beever-Jones has a good relationship with teammate Niamh Charles, who joined Chelsea at a similar age, and has said she is good friends with former England under-23 teammates Khiara Keating and Grace Clinton.

== Career statistics ==
=== Club ===
As of match played 21 November 2026.

Club	Season	League	League		National Cup (Note: Includes the Women's FA Cup.)		League Cup (Note: Includes the FA Women's League Cup.)		Continental (Note: Appearance(s) in the UEFA Women's Champions League.)		Total	
Club	Season	League	Apps	Goals	Apps	Goals	Apps	Goals	Apps	Goals	Apps	Goals
Chelsea	2020–21	Women's Super League	2	0	1	0	0	0	0	0	3	0
Chelsea	2023–24	Women's Super League	17	11	4	1	3	1	7	0	31	13
Chelsea	2024–25	Women's Super League	22	9	5	2	3	1	9	1	39	13
Chelsea	2025–26	Women's Super League	17	4	1	0	2	2	4	0	24	6
Chelsea	2026–27	Women's Super League	9	1	0	0	—		4	0	13	1
Chelsea	Total		67	25	11	3	8	4	24	1	110	33
Bristol City (loan)	2021–22	Championship	22	5	2	1	3	1	—		27	7
Everton (loan)	2022–23	Women's Super League	16	2	1	0	4	1	—		21	3
Career total			105	32	14	4	15	6	24	1	158	43

=== International ===
As of match played 3 March 2026

Appearances and goals by national team and year
National team	Year	Apps	Goals
England	2024	2	0
England	2025	13	7
England	2026	1	0
Total		16	7

Scores and results list England's goal tally first, score column indicates score after each Beever-Jones goal.

List of international goals scored by Aggie Beever-Jones
No.	Date	Venue	Cap	Opponent	Score	Result	Competition	Ref.
1	4 April 2025	Ashton Gate, Bristol, England	4	Belgium	3–0	5–0	2025 UEFA Nations League A	
2	30 May 2025	Wembley Stadium, London, England	6	Portugal	1–0	6–0	2025 UEFA Nations League A	
3	30 May 2025	Wembley Stadium, London, England	6	Portugal	3–0	6–0	2025 UEFA Nations League A	
4	30 May 2025	Wembley Stadium, London, England	6	Portugal	5–0	6–0	2025 UEFA Nations League A	
5	29 June 2025	King Power Stadium, Leicester, England	8	Jamaica	6–0	7–0	Friendly	
6	13 July 2025	Kybunpark, St. Gallen, Switzerland	10	Wales	6–1	6–1	UEFA Euro 2025	
7	28 October 2025	Pride Park Stadium, Derby, England	13	Australia	1–0	3–0	Friendly	

== Honours ==
Chelsea

- Women's Super League: 2023–24, 2024–25
- Women's FA Cup: 2020–21, 2024–25
- FA Women's League Cup: 2024–25, 2025–26

England

- UEFA Women's Championship: 2025
