= 2023–24 Chelsea F.C. Women season =

Chelsea
2023–24 season
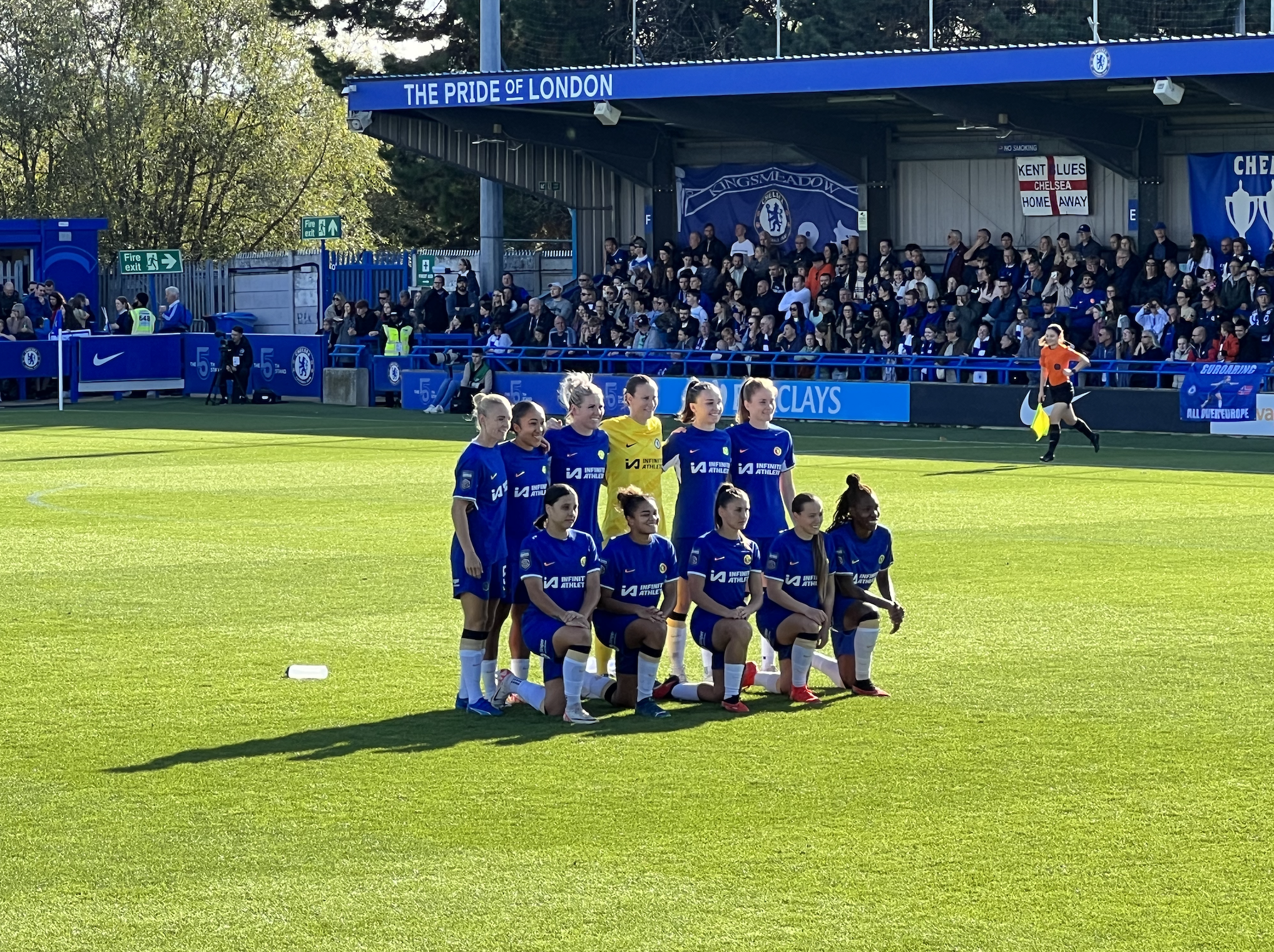
- Chairman: Adrian Jacob
- Manager: Emma Hayes
- Stadium: Kingsmeadow
- FA WSL: 1st
- FA Cup: Semi-final
- League Cup: Runner-up
- Champions League: Semi-final
- Top goalscorer: League: Lauren James (13); All: Lauren James (16)
- Highest home attendance: 39,398 (vs. Barcelona, 27 April 2024, Champions League)
- Lowest home attendance: 765 (vs. Sunderland, 7 February 2024, League Cup)
- Average home league attendance: 10,648
- Biggest win: 8–0 (vs. Bristol City, 5 May 2024, WSL)
- Biggest defeat: 1–4 (vs. Arsenal, 10 December 2023, WSL)
Home colours	Away colours	Third colours

The 2023–24 season was Chelsea Women's 32nd competitive season and 14th consecutive season in the FA Women's Super League, the top flight of English women's football. It was Chelsea's last season under manager Emma Hayes as she left the club at the end of the season to become the new manager of the United States women's national team. Chelsea competed in the domestic league as four-time defending champions since the 2019–20 season, and retained the title for the fifth consecutive time.

== Squad information ==
=== First team squad ===
As of 19 April 2024

No.	Name	Nat	Since	Date of birth (age)	Signed from
Goalkeepers
1	Zećira Mušović	(Sweden)	2021	26 May 1996 (age 30)	(Sweden) Rosengård
16	Nicky Evrard	(Belgium)	2023	26 May 1995 (age 31)	(Belgium) OH Leuven
24	Hannah Hampton	(England)	2023	16 November 2000 (age 25)	(England) Aston Villa
Defenders
3	Aniek Nouwen	(Netherlands)	2021	9 March 1999 (age 27)	(Netherlands) PSV
4	Millie Bright (captain)	(England)	2014	21 August 1993 (age 32)	(England) Doncaster Rovers Belles
7	Jess Carter	(England)	2018	27 October 1997 (age 28)	(England) Birmingham City
12	Ashley Lawrence	(Canada)	2023	11 June 1995 (age 31)	(France) Paris Saint-Germain
15	Ève Périsset	(France)	2022	24 December 1994 (age 31)	(France) Bordeaux
18	Maren Mjelde	(Norway)	2016	6 November 1989 (age 36)	(Norway) Avaldsnes IL
21	Niamh Charles	(England)	2020	21 June 1999 (age 27)	(England) Liverpool
26	Kadeisha Buchanan	(Canada)	2022	5 November 1995 (age 30)	(France) Lyon
29	Jorja Fox	(England)	2021	28 August 2003 (age 22)	Homegrown
39	Nathalie Björn	(Sweden)	2023	4 May 1997 (age 29)	(England) Everton
Midfielders
5	Sophie Ingle	(Wales)	2018	2 September 1991 (age 34)	(England) Liverpool
6	Sjoeke Nüsken	(Germany)	2023	22 January 2001 (age 25)	(Germany) Eintracht Frankfurt
8	Melanie Leupolz	(Germany)	2020	14 April 1994 (age 32)	(Germany) Bayern Munich
11	Guro Reiten	(Norway)	2019	26 July 1994 (age 31)	(Norway) LSK Kvinner
19	Johanna Rytting Kaneryd	(Sweden)	2022	12 February 1997 (age 29)	(Sweden) BK Häcken
22	Erin Cuthbert	(Scotland)	2016	19 July 1998 (age 27)	(Scotland) Glasgow City
28	Jelena Čanković	(Serbia)	2022	13 August 1995 (age 30)	(Sweden) FC Rosengård
Forwards
2	Mia Fishel	(United States)	2023	30 April 2001 (age 25)	(Mexico) Tigres
9	Catarina Macario	(United States)	2023	4 October 1999 (age 26)	(France) Olympique Lyonnais
10	Lauren James	(England)	2021	29 September 2001 (age 24)	(England) Manchester United
14	Fran Kirby	(England)	2015	29 June 1993 (age 33)	(England) Reading
20	Sam Kerr	(Australia)	2019	10 September 1993 (age 32)	(United States) Chicago Red Stars
23	Maika Hamano	(Japan)	2023	19 May 2004 (age 22)	(Japan) INAC Kobe Leonessa
33	Aggie Beever-Jones	(England)	2021	27 July 2003 (age 22)	Homegrown
35	Mayra Ramírez	(Colombia)	2024	23 March 1999 (age 27)	(Spain) Levante

=== New contracts ===
No.	Pos	Player/Manager	Date	Contract end	Source
10	FW	(England) Lauren James	1 June 2023	2027	
18	DF	(Norway) Maren Mjelde	4 June 2023	2024	
32	GK	(England) Emily Orman	3 August 2023	2025	
—	MF	(England) Lexi Potter	3 September 2023	2026	
25	FW	(England) Lucy Watson	15 September 2023	2025	
11	MF	(Norway) Guro Reiten	2 December 2023	2026	
21	DF	(England) Niamh Charles	19 January 2024	2027	
33	FW	(England) Aggie Beever-Jones	28 January 2024	2026	

== Transfers and loans ==
=== In ===
Pos	Player	Transferred From	Fee	Date	Source
DF	(Spain) Alejandra Bernabé	(Spain) Real Sociedad	Undisclosed	23 June 2023	
GK	(Belgium) Nicky Evrard	(Belgium) OH Leuven	Undisclosed	1 July 2023	
MF	(Germany) Sjoeke Nüsken	(Germany) Eintracht Frankfurt	Undisclosed	1 July 2023	
MF	(United States) Catarina Macario	(France) Olympique Lyonnais	Undisclosed	1 July 2023	
DF	(Canada) Ashley Lawrence	(France) Paris Saint-Germain	Undisclosed	1 July 2023	
GK	(England) Hannah Hampton	(England) Aston Villa	Free	4 July 2023	
DF	(England) Brooke Aspin	(England) Bristol City	Undisclosed	7 July 2023	
FW	(United States) Mia Fishel	(Mexico) Tigres	Undisclosed	3 August 2023	
MF	(Netherlands) Wieke Kaptein	(Netherlands) Twente	Undisclosed	4 September 2023	
DF	(Sweden) Nathalie Björn	(England) Everton	Undisclosed	10 January 2024	
FW	(Colombia) Mayra Ramírez	(Spain) Levante	Undisclosed	26 January 2024	

=== Out ===
Pos	Player	Transferred To	Fee	Date	Source
DF	(Sweden) Magdalena Eriksson	(Germany) Bayern Munich	Free	1 July 2023	
FW	(Denmark) Pernille Harder	(Germany) Bayern Munich	Free	1 July 2023	
FW	(England) Emma Thompson	(England) Southampton	Undisclosed	18 August 2023	
MF	(Canada) Jessie Fleming	(United States) Portland Thorns	Undisclosed	31 January 2024	
GK	(Germany) Ann-Katrin Berger	(United States) NJ/NY Gotham FC	Undisclosed	19 April 2024	

=== Loan out ===
Pos	Player	To	Date	Until	Source
FW	(Japan) Maika Hamano	(Sweden) Hammarby IF	13 January 2023	December 2023	
DF	(Spain) Alejandra Bernabé	(Spain) Real Sociedad	1 July 2023	End of season	
DF	(England) Brooke Aspin	(England) Bristol City	7 July 2023	End of season	
FW	(England) Reanna Blades	(England) Lewes	19 July 2023	End of season	
GK	(England) Emily Orman	(England) Reading	3 August 2023	End of season	
MF	(England) Charlotte Wardlaw	(Scotland) Glasgow City	15 August 2023	End of season	
DF	(Russia) Alsu Abdullina	(France) Paris FC	23 August 2023	End of season	
MF	(England) Lexi Potter	(England) Crystal Palace	3 September 2023	End of season	
MF	(Netherlands) Wieke Kaptein	(Netherlands) Twente	4 September 2023	End of season	
GK	(Belgium) Nicky Evrard	(England) Brighton & Hove Albion	14 September 2023	9 January 2024	
FW	(England) Lucy Watson	(England) Crystal Palace	15 September 2023	End of season	
DF	(England) Cerys Brown	(England) Watford	31 January 2024	End of season	
MF	(Czech Republic) Kateřina Svitková	(Czech Republic) Slavia Prague	5 February 2024	End of season	

== Management team ==
Position	Staff
Manager	(England) Emma Hayes
Assistant manager	(England) Paul Green
Assistant coach	(United States) Denise Reddy
Assistant coach	(Australia) Tanya Oxtoby
Head of technical/Goalkeeping coach	(England) Stuart Searle
Movement coach	(England) Harry McCulloch
Scouting co-ordinator and academy coach	(England) TJ O'Leary
Performance analyst	(Republic of Ireland) Ferdia O'Hanrahan

Source: Chelsea F.C.

== Kit ==
Home	Home alt.	Home alt. 2	Away	Away alt.	Third	Goalkeeper 1	Goalkeeper 2	Goalkeeper 3

== Pre-season ==
3 September 2023 Friendly	Chelsea (England)	3–2	(Italy) Roma	Kingston upon Thames
20:00 BST	Reiten 25'; James 37'; Beever-Jones 90+3'	Report	Haavi 7'; Giacinti 30'	Stadium: Kingsmeadow

== Competitions ==
=== Women's Super League ===
==== League table ====
Pos	Team	Pld	W	D	L	GF	GA	GD	Pts	Qualification or relegation
1	Chelsea (C)	22	18	1	3	71	18	+53	55	Qualification for the Champions League group stage
2	Manchester City	22	18	1	3	61	15	+46	55	Qualification for the Champions League second round
3	Arsenal	22	16	2	4	53	20	+33	50	Qualification for the Champions League first round
4	Liverpool	22	12	5	5	36	28	+8	41	
5	Manchester United	22	10	5	7	42	32	+10	35	

Source: Women's Super League Table
Rules for classification: 1) Points; 2) Goal difference; 3) Number of goals scored.
(C) Champions

==== Results summary ====
Overall								Home						Away					
Pld	W	D	L	GF	GA	GD	Pts	W	D	L	GF	GA	GD	W	D	L	GF	GA	GD
22	18	1	3	71	18	+53	55	10	0	1	38	9	+29	8	1	2	33	9	+24

Last updated: 18 May 2024.
Source: FA WSL

==== Results by matchday ====
Matchday	1	2	3	4	5	6	7	8	9	10	11	12	13	14	15	16	17	18	19	20	21	22
Result	W	D	W	W	W	W	W	W	L	W	W	W	W	L	W	W	W	W	L	W	W	W
Position	4	5	3	2	1	1	1	1	1	1	1	1	1	1	1	1	1	1	2	2	1	1

Updated to match(es) played on 18 May 2024. Source: FA WSL
W = Win; D = Draw; L = Loss

==== Matches ====
1 October 2023 1	Chelsea	2–1	Tottenham Hotspur	Fulham
17:30 BST	Fishel 28'; James 51'	Report	Spence (yellow card) 30'; Thomas 76'	Stadium: Stamford Bridge; Attendance: 14,776; Referee: Cheryl Foster

8 October 2023 2	Manchester City	1–1	Chelsea	Manchester
13:00 BST	Kelly 7', (yellow card) 39'; Greenwood (yellow card) 17' (yellow-red card) 38'; Aleixandri (yellow card) 38'; Roord (yellow card) 45+4'; Hemp (yellow card) 67' (yellow-red card) 81'	Report	James (yellow card) 11'; Charles (yellow card) 35'; Reiten 90+6'; Čanković (yellow card) 90+8'	Stadium: Academy Stadium; Attendance: 5,249; Referee: Emily Heaslip

15 October 2023 3	Chelsea	2–0	West Ham United	Kingston upon Thames
14:00 BST	Leupolz (yellow card) 18'; Kerr 36'; Cuthbert 90'	Report	Cissoko (yellow card) 34'	Stadium: Kingsmeadow; Attendance: 3,313; Referee: Stacey Pearson

22 October 2023 4	Chelsea	4–2	Brighton & Hove Albion	Kingston upon Thames
14:00 BST	Nüsken 45+4', 52', 74'; Beever-Jones 82'	Report	Bremer 10'; Terland 90'	Stadium: Kingsmeadow; Attendance: 3,647; Referee: Stacey Fullicks

4 November 2023 5	Aston Villa	0–6	Chelsea	Walsall
12:30 GMT	Patten (yellow card) 35'	Report	Bright 21'; Kirby 26'; Rytting Kaneryd 45'; Lawrence 63'; Beever-Jones 67'; Charles 73'	Stadium: Bescot Stadium; Attendance: 4,086; Referee: Abigail Byrne

12 November 2023 6	Everton	0–3	Chelsea	Walton
15:00 GMT		Report	Fleming 14', (yellow card) 43'; Nüsken (yellow card) 53'; Kerr 62'; Beever-Jones 90'	Stadium: Walton Hall Park; Attendance: 1,737; Referee: Lauren Impey

19 November 2023 7	Chelsea	5–1	Liverpool	Fulham
15:00 GMT	James 11', 56', 64', (yellow card) 62'; Beever-Jones 24'; Nüsken 78'	Report	Carter 13' (o.g.); Bonner (yellow card) 41'; Holland (yellow card) 90+2'	Stadium: Stamford Bridge; Attendance: 12,802; Referee: Kirsty Dowle

26 November 2023 8	Chelsea	5–2	Leicester City	Kingston upon Thames
15:00 GMT	James 2', 58'; Nevin 5' (o.g.); Kerr 40'; Beever-Jones 88'		Rantala 26'; Howard (yellow card) 33'; Tierney 44'; Petermann (yellow card) 48'; Thibaud (yellow card) 75'	Stadium: Kingsmeadow; Attendance: 2,558; Referee: Megan Wilson

10 December 2023 9	Arsenal	4–1	Chelsea	Holloway
15:00 GMT	Mead 8'; Ilestedt 36'; Russo 38', 74' (pen.); McCabe (yellow card) 54'; Foord (yellow card) 56'; Maritz (yellow card) 82'; Maanum (yellow card) 84'; Pelova (yellow card) 87'		Rytting Kaneryd 13'; James (yellow card) 70'	Stadium: Emirates Stadium; Attendance: 59,042; Referee: Rebecca Welch

17 December 2023 10	Bristol City	0–3	Chelsea	Bristol
15:00 GMT		Report	James 17'; Charles (yellow card) 24' (yellow-red card) 90+6'; Cuthbert 34'; Kerr 59'	Stadium: Ashton Gate; Attendance: 9,442; Referee: Amy Fearn

21 January 2024 11	Chelsea	3–1	Manchester United	Fulham
15:00 GMT	James 5', 23', 85'	Report	Ladd 43', (yellow card) 50'; Parris (yellow card) 76'	Stadium: Stamford Bridge; Attendance: 20,473; Referee: Abigail Byrne

27 January 2024 12	Brighton & Hove Albion	0–3	Chelsea	Crawley
17:30 GMT		Report	James 46', 59'; Kirby 51'	Stadium: Broadfield Stadium; Attendance: 4,549; Referee: Amy Fearn

4 February 2024 13	Chelsea	3–0	Everton	Kingston upon Thames
18:45 GMT	Reiten 27' (pen.), 72' (pen.); James (yellow card) 65'; Cuthbert 83'	Report	Wheeler (yellow card) 26'; Brosnan (yellow card) 26'	Stadium: Kingsmeadow; Attendance: 2,013; Referee: Emily Heaslip

16 February 2024 14	Chelsea	0–1	Manchester City	Kingston upon Thames
19:15 GMT	Cuthbert (yellow card) 52'; James (yellow card) 84'	Report	Shaw 14'; Kelly (yellow card) 54'	Stadium: Kingsmeadow; Attendance: 3,284; Referee: Abigail Byrne

3 March 2024 15	Leicester City	0–4	Chelsea	Leicester
18:00 GMT	Momiki (yellow card) 80'	Report	Björn 38'; Ramírez 44'; Rytting Kaneryd 64'; Macario 78'	Stadium: King Power Stadium; Attendance: 3,101; Referee: Phoebe Cross

15 March 2024 16	Chelsea	3–1	Arsenal	Fulham
19:30 GMT	James 15'; Nüsken 21', 32'; Hampton (yellow card) 87'	Report	McCabe (yellow card) 42'; Lacasse (yellow card) 67'; Macario 87' (o.g.)	Stadium: Stamford Bridge; Attendance: 32,970; Referee: Rebecca Welch
Note: This match, originally scheduled for a 19:00 kick-off, was delayed by 30 minutes due to a kit clash with the Arsenal players.

24 March 2024 17	West Ham United	0–2	Chelsea	Dagenham
16:30 GMT	Bergman-Lundin (yellow card) 64'	Report	Beever-Jones 2'; Leupolz (yellow card) 72'; Cuthbert 88'	Stadium: Victoria Road; Attendance: 2,555; Referee: Megan Wilson

17 April 2024 19	Chelsea	3–0	Aston Villa	Kingston upon Thames
19:00 BST	Beever-Jones 18'; Hamano 38'; Ingle (yellow card) 61'; Buchanan 64'; Lawrence (yellow card) 77'	Report	Leat (red card) 4'; Corsie (yellow card) 8'; Daly (yellow card) 45+4'	Stadium: Kingsmeadow; Attendance: 1,801; Referee: Melissa Burgin
Note: This match, originally scheduled for 21 April, was moved forward due to Chelsea's participation in the UEFA Women's Champions League semi-finals.

1 May 2024 20	Liverpool	4–3	Chelsea	Birkenhead
19:00 BST	Haug 51'; Cuthbert 66' (o.g.); Kiernan 81'; Bonner (yellow card) 89', (goal) 90+2'	Report	Beever-Jones 9', 80'; Carter (yellow card) 40'; Micah 83' (o.g.)	Stadium: Prenton Park; Attendance: 2,129; Referee: Lisa Benn
Note: This match, originally scheduled for 28 April, was postponed due to Chelsea's participation in the UEFA Women's Champions League semi-finals.

5 May 2024 21	Chelsea	8–0	Bristol City	Kingston upon Thames
18:45 BST	Reiten 6' (pen.), 56', 70', 77'; Nüsken 23'; Beever-Jones 52', 88'; Charles 74'	Report	Rodgers (yellow card) 86'	Stadium: Kingsmeadow; Attendance: 4,289; Referee: Stacey Fullicks

15 May 2024 18	Tottenham Hotspur	0–1	Chelsea	Leyton
19:15 BST		Report	Hamano 37'; Carter (yellow card) 90+4'	Stadium: Brisbane Road; Attendance: 2,523; Referee: Emily Heaslip
Note: This match, originally intended to be played on 31 March, was postponed due to Chelsea's involvement in the 2024 FA Women's League Cup final.

18 May 2024 22	Manchester United	0–6	Chelsea	Trafford
15:00 BST	García (yellow card) 67'	Report	Ramírez 2', 45+2'; Rytting Kaneryd 8'; Nüsken 44'; Leupolz 47'; Kirby 85'	Stadium: Old Trafford; Attendance: 28,737; Referee: Rebecca Welch

=== FA Cup ===
14 January 2024 Fourth round proper	Chelsea	3–1 (a.e.t.)	West Ham United	Kingston upon Thames
13:00 GMT	Fishel 70'; Reiten (yellow card) 86'; Cuthbert 101'; Beever-Jones 105+2'; Nüsken (yellow card) 108'	Report	Tysiak (yellow card) 12'; Asseyi 18'; Shimizu (yellow card) 44'; Arnold (yellow card) 66'; Gorry (yellow card) 72'	Stadium: Kingsmeadow; Attendance: 2,824; Referee: Emily Heaslip

11 February 2024 Fifth round proper	Chelsea	1–0	Crystal Palace	Kingston upon Thames
14:00 GMT	Ramírez 81'	Report	Everett (yellow card) 24'	Stadium: Kingsmeadow; Attendance: 2,992; Referee: Ella Broad

10 March 2024 Quarter-final	Everton	0–1	Chelsea	Walton
13:00 GMT	Payne (yellow card) 45+2'	Report	Carter (yellow card) 61'; Macário 66'	Stadium: Walton Hall Park; Attendance: 1,212; Referee: Abigail Byrne

14 April 2024 Semi-final	Manchester United	2–1	Chelsea	Leigh
14:35 BST	García 1', (yellow card) 68'; Williams 23'; Turner (yellow card) 45+5'; Mannion (yellow card) 77'; Parris (yellow card) 78'; Earps (yellow card) 79'	Report	James 45+4', (yellow card) 45+5'	Stadium: Leigh Sports Village; Attendance: 6,876; Referee: Kirsty Dowle

=== League Cup ===
==== Knockout phase ====
7 February 2024 Quarter-final	Chelsea	5–0	Sunderland	Kingston upon Thames
19:00 GMT	Nüsken 28', 44'; Beever-Jones 46', (yellow card) 58'; Hamano (yellow card) 68'; Kirby 83', 90+1'	Report	Fenton (yellow card) 53'	Stadium: Kingsmeadow; Attendance: 765; Referee: Phoebe Cross

7 March 2024 Semi-final	Manchester City	0–1	Chelsea	Manchester
19:15 GMT	Kelly (yellow card) 56'	Report	James 8', (yellow card) 90+3'	Stadium: Academy Stadium; Attendance: 3,066; Referee: Andrew Kitchen

31 March 2024 Final	Arsenal	1–0 (a.e.t.)	Chelsea	Wolverhampton
15:00 BST	Blackstenius 116'	Report	James (yellow card) 51'; Cuthbert (yellow card) 90+1'	Stadium: Molineux Stadium; Attendance: 21,462; Referee: Cheryl Foster

=== UEFA Women's Champions League ===
==== Group stage ====
Chelsea were drawn into Group D alongside Real Madrid, BK Häcken and Paris FC.

Pos	Team	Pld	W	D	L	GF	GA	GD	Pts	Qualification	CHE	HAC	PFC	RMA
1	(England) Chelsea	6	4	2	0	15	5	+10	14	Advance to quarter-finals	—	0–0	4–1	2–1
2	(Sweden) BK Häcken	6	3	2	1	6	5	+1	11	Advance to quarter-finals	1–3	—	0–0	2–1
3	(France) Paris FC	6	2	1	3	5	11	−6	7		0–4	1–2	—	2–1
4	(Spain) Real Madrid	6	0	1	5	5	10	−5	1		2–2	0–1	0–1	—

Source: UEFA
Rules for classification: Group stage tiebreakers

15 November 2023 1	Real Madrid (Spain)	2–2	(England) Chelsea	Madrid
21:00 CET	Carmona 10', 79' (pen.); Toletti (yellow card) 45'; Kathellen (yellow card) 90'	Report	Charles 41'; Kerr 74'	Stadium: Alfredo Di Stéfano Stadium; Attendance: 2,913; Referee: Frida Klarlund (Denmark)

23 November 2023 2	Chelsea (England)	4–1	(France) Paris FC	Fulham
20:00 GMT	Buchanan (yellow card) 29'; Kerr 30', 48', 55'; Ingle 90+1'	Report	Gréboval 38'	Stadium: Stamford Bridge; Attendance: 3,450; Referee: Ivana Martinčić (Croatia)

14 December 2023 3	Chelsea (England)	0–0	(Sweden) BK Häcken	Fulham
20:00 GMT		Report		Stadium: Stamford Bridge; Attendance: 3,300; Referee: Esther Staubli (Switzerland)

20 December 2023 4	BK Häcken (Sweden)	1–3	(England) Chelsea	Gothenburg
21:00 CET	Fossdalsá (yellow card) 22'; Larisey 26'	Report	Kerr 14'; Cuthbert 52', 64'	Stadium: Bravida Arena; Attendance: 5,566; Referee: Ewa Augustyn (Poland)

24 January 2024 5	Chelsea (England)	2–1	(Spain) Real Madrid	Fulham
20:00 GMT	Reiten 62' (pen.); Chavas 70' (o.g.)	Report	Athenea 69'	Stadium: Stamford Bridge; Attendance: 11,262; Referee: Catarina Campos (Portugal)

30 January 2024 6	Paris FC (France)	0–4	(England) Chelsea	Paris
18:45 CET	Korošec (yellow card) 81'	Report	Kirby 10'; Fishel 37'; Ingle (yellow card) 51'; Reiten 74'; Mjelde 79'	Stadium: Stade Sébastien Charléty; Attendance: 13,274; Referee: Ivana Projkovska (North Macedonia)

==== Quarter-finals ====
19 March 2024 First leg	Ajax (Netherlands)	0–3	(England) Chelsea	Amsterdam
18:45 CET	Yohannes (yellow card) 14'	Report	James 19'; Nüsken 44', 83'	Stadium: Johan Cruyff Arena; Attendance: 35,997; Referee: Maria Sole Ferrieri Caputi (Italy)

27 March 2024 Second leg	Chelsea (England)	1–1 (4–1 agg.)	(Netherlands) Ajax	Fulham
20:00 GMT	Ramírez 33'; Périsset (yellow card) 90+2'	Report	Grant 65'	Stadium: Stamford Bridge; Attendance: 11,820; Referee: Tess Olofsson (Sweden)
Note: Chelsea won 4–1 on aggregate.

==== Semi-finals ====
20 April 2024 First leg	Barcelona (Spain)	0–1	(England) Chelsea	Barcelona
13:30 CEST	Guijarro (yellow card) 79'; Paredes (yellow card) 83'	Report	Cuthbert 40'	Stadium: Estadi Olímpic Lluís Companys; Attendance: 36,428; Referee: Stéphanie Frappart (France)

27 April 2024 Second leg	Chelsea (England)	0–2 (1–2 agg.)	(Spain) Barcelona	Fulham
17:30 BST	Buchanan (yellow card) 54' (yellow-red card) 59'; Charles (yellow card) 87'	Report	Bonmatí 25'; Rolfö 75' (pen.); Paralluelo (yellow card) 87'	Stadium: Stamford Bridge; Attendance: 39,398; Referee: Iuliana Demetrescu (Romania)
Note: Barcelona won 2–1 on aggregate.

== Statistics ==
=== Appearances and goals ===
As of 18 May 2024

No.	Pos	Nat	Player	Total		WSL		FA Cup		League Cup		Champions League	
No.	Pos	Nat	Player	Apps	Goals	Apps	Goals	Apps	Goals	Apps	Goals	Apps	Goals
Goalkeepers:
1	GK	(Sweden) SWE	Zećira Mušović	14	0	7	0	2	0	1	0	4	0
16	GK	(Belgium) BEL	Nicky Evrard	0	0	0	0	0	0	0	0	0	0
24	GK	(England) ENG	Hannah Hampton	18	0	10	0	2	0	2	0	4	0
Defenders:
3	DF	(Netherlands) NED	Aniek Nouwen	1	0	0+1	0	0	0	0	0	0	0
4	DF	(England) ENG	Millie Bright	12	1	10	1	0	0	0	0	1+1	0
7	DF	(England) ENG	Jess Carter	36	0	19+2	0	4	0	2	0	9	0
12	DF	(Canada) CAN	Ashley Lawrence	30	1	10+8	1	2+1	0	0	0	8+1	0
15	DF	(France) FRA	Ève Périsset	25	0	10+3	0	3	0	3	0	4+2	0
18	DF	(Norway) NOR	Maren Mjelde	10	1	5+2	0	0	0	1	0	1+1	1
21	DF	(England) ENG	Niamh Charles	36	3	22	2	2+1	0	2	0	8+1	1
26	DF	(Canada) CAN	Kadeisha Buchanan	20	1	5+2	1	2	0	2	0	9	0
29	DF	(England) ENG	Jorja Fox	0	0	0	0	0	0	0	0	0	0
39	DF	(Sweden) SWE	Nathalie Björn	12	1	8+1	1	2+1	0	0	0	0	0
Midfielders:
5	MF	(Wales) WAL	Sophie Ingle	24	1	9+5	0	2	0	1+1	0	4+2	1
6	MF	(Germany) GER	Sjoeke Nüsken	38	12	13+8	8	1+3	0	3	2	6+4	2
8	MF	(Germany) GER	Melanie Leupolz	21	1	9+2	1	2+2	0	2	0	4	0
11	MF	(Norway) NOR	Guro Reiten	29	9	12+4	7	3	0	1+1	0	5+3	2
19	MF	(Sweden) SWE	Johanna Rytting Kaneryd	34	4	13+5	4	4	0	1+1	0	8+2	0
22	MF	(Scotland) SCO	Erin Cuthbert	35	8	17+3	4	4	1	2	0	9	3
28	MF	(Serbia) SRB	Jelena Čanković	16	0	3+6	0	1+1	0	2	0	1+2	0
Forwards:
2	FW	(United States) USA	Mia Fishel	17	3	4+6	1	0+1	1	1	0	2+3	1
9	FW	(United States) USA	Catarina Macário	15	2	4+4	1	0+2	1	0+1	0	1+3	0
10	FW	(England) ENG	Lauren James	29	16	14+2	13	2+1	1	2	1	5+3	1
14	FW	(England) ENG	Fran Kirby	33	6	9+12	3	3+1	0	1	2	5+2	1
20	FW	(Australia) AUS	Sam Kerr	12	9	7+1	4	0	0	0	0	4	5
23	FW	(Japan) JPN	Maika Hamano	8	2	3+3	2	0+1	0	1	0	0	0
33	FW	(England) ENG	Aggie Beever-Jones	31	13	6+11	11	1+3	1	1+2	1	2+5	0
35	FW	(Colombia) COL	Mayra Ramírez	13	5	4+3	3	2	1	2	0	2	1
Players loaned out or have left the club:
13	MF	(Czech Republic) CZE	Kateřina Svitková	0	0	0	0	0	0	0	0	0	0
17	MF	(Canada) CAN	Jessie Fleming	13	1	4+6	1	0	0	0	0	2+1	0
25	FW	(England) ENG	Lucy Watson	0	0	0	0	0	0	0	0	0	0
27	DF	(Russia) RUS	Alsu Abdullina	0	0	0	0	0	0	0	0	0	0
30	GK	(Germany) GER	Ann-Katrin Berger	7	0	5	0	0	0	0	0	2	0
32	GK	(England) ENG	Emily Orman	0	0	0	0	0	0	0	0	0	0
34	MF	(England) ENG	Charlotte Wardlaw	0	0	0	0	0	0	0	0	0	0

- Source: Chelsea F.C.

=== Goalscorers ===
Includes all competitive matches. The list is sorted by squad number when total goals are equal.

As of 18 May 2024

Rank	Pos.	No.	Player	FA WSL	FA Cup	League Cup	Champions League	Total
1	FW	10	(England) Lauren James	13	1	1	1	16
2	FW	33	(England) Aggie Beever-Jones	11	1	1	0	13
3	MF	6	(Germany) Sjoeke Nüsken	8	0	2	2	12
4	MF	11	(Norway) Guro Reiten	7	0	0	2	9
4	FW	20	(Australia) Sam Kerr	4	0	0	5	9
6	MF	22	(Scotland) Erin Cuthbert	4	1	0	3	8
7	FW	14	(England) Fran Kirby	3	0	2	1	6
8	FW	35	(Colombia) Mayra Ramírez	3	1	0	1	5
9	MF	19	(Sweden) Johanna Rytting Kaneryd	4	0	0	0	4
10	FW	2	(United States) Mia Fishel	1	1	0	1	3
10	DF	21	(England) Niamh Charles	2	0	0	1	3
12	FW	9	(United States) Catarina Macario	1	1	0	0	2
12	FW	23	(Japan) Maika Hamano	2	0	0	0	2
14	DF	4	(England) Millie Bright	1	0	0	0	1
14	MF	5	(Wales) Sophie Ingle	0	0	0	1	1
14	MF	8	(Germany) Melanie Leupolz	1	0	0	0	1
14	DF	12	(Canada) Ashley Lawrence	1	0	0	0	1
14	DF	16	(Norway) Maren Mjelde	0	0	0	1	1
14	MF	17	(Canada) Jessie Fleming	1	0	0	0	1
14	DF	26	(Canada) Kadeisha Buchanan	1	0	0	0	1
14	DF	39	(Sweden) Nathalie Björn	1	0	0	0	1
Own goal(s)				2	0	0	1	3

=== Clean sheets ===
Includes all competitive matches. The list is sorted by squad number when total clean sheets are equal.

As of 18 May 2024

Rank	Pos.	No.	Player	FA WSL	FA Cup	League Cup	Champions League	Total
1	GK	24	(England) Hannah Hampton	6	1	1	2	10
2	GK	1	(Sweden) Zećira Mušović	4	1	1	2	8
3	GK	30	(Germany) Ann-Katrin Berger	2	0	0	0	2

=== Disciplinary records ===
Includes all competitive matches. The list is sorted by squad number when total clean sheets are equal.

As of 18 May 2024

Pos.	No.	Name	FA WSL			FA Cup			League Cup			Champions League			Total		
Pos.	No.	Name	Booked	(yellow card) (yellow-red card)	Sent off (straight red)	Booked	(yellow card) (yellow-red card)	Sent off (straight red)	Booked	(yellow card) (yellow-red card)	Sent off (straight red)	Booked	(yellow card) (yellow-red card)	Sent off (straight red)	Booked	(yellow card) (yellow-red card)	Sent off (straight red)
MF	5	(Wales) Sophie Ingle	1	0	0	0	0	0	0	0	0	1	0	0	2	0	0
MF	6	(Germany) Sjoeke Nüsken	1	0	0	1	0	0	0	0	0	0	0	0	2	0	0
DF	7	(England) Jess Carter	2	0	0	1	0	0	0	0	0	0	0	0	3	0	0
MF	8	(Germany) Melanie Leupolz	2	0	0	0	0	0	0	0	0	0	0	0	2	0	0
FW	10	(England) Lauren James	5	0	0	1	0	0	2	0	0	0	0	0	8	0	0
MF	11	(Norway) Guro Reiten	0	0	0	1	0	0	0	0	0	0	0	0	1	0	0
DF	12	(Canada) Ashley Lawrence	1	0	0	0	0	0	0	0	0	0	0	0	1	0	0
DF	15	(France) Ève Périsset	0	0	0	0	0	0	0	0	0	1	0	0	1	0	0
MF	17	(Canada) Jessie Fleming	1	0	0	0	0	0	0	0	0	0	0	0	1	0	0
DF	21	(England) Niamh Charles	1	1	0	0	0	0	0	0	0	1	0	0	2	1	0
MF	22	(Scotland) Erin Cuthbert	1	0	0	0	0	0	1	0	0	0	0	0	2	0	0
FW	23	(Japan) Maika Hamano	0	0	0	0	0	0	1	0	0	0	0	0	1	0	0
GK	24	(England) Hannah Hampton	1	0	0	0	0	0	0	0	0	0	0	0	1	0	0
DF	26	(Canada) Kadeisha Buchanan	1	0	0	0	0	0	0	0	0	1	1	0	1	1	0
MF	28	(Serbia) Jelena Čanković	1	0	0	0	0	0	0	0	0	0	0	0	1	0	0
FW	33	(England) Aggie Beever-Jones	0	0	0	0	0	0	1	0	0	0	0	0	1	0	0
