= Football at the 2020 Summer Olympics – Women's qualification (CAF–CONMEBOL play-off) =

2020 Women's Olympic Football Tournament qualification (CAF–CONMEBOL play-off)
- Event: Football at the 2020 Summer Olympics – Women's qualification
Cameroon	Chile
(Cameroon)	(Chile)
1	2
- on aggregate

First leg
Cameroon	Chile
1	2
- Date: 10 April 2021
- Venue: Arslan Zeki Demirci Sports Complex, Antalya
- Referee: Anastasia Pustovoitova (Russia)

Second leg
Chile	Cameroon
0	0
- Date: 13 April 2021
- Venue: Arslan Zeki Demirci Sports Complex, Antalya
- Referee: Katalin Kulcsár (Hungary)

The CAF–CONMEBOL play-off of the 2020 Women's Olympic Football Tournament qualification competition was a two-legged tie that decided one spot in the Olympic football tournament in Japan. The play-off was contested by the runners-up from CAF, Cameroon, and the runners-up from CONMEBOL, Chile.

Originally, the first leg would be hosted by Cameroon, while the second leg would be hosted by Chile. However, due to the COVID-19 pandemic, FIFA established that the matches would be played in a neutral country, Turkey, at the Arslan Zeki Demirci Sports Complex in Antalya.

Chile won the first leg 2–1, while the second leg finished as a 0–0 draw. With a 2–1 victory on aggregate, Chile qualified for their first Olympic football tournament.

== Qualified teams ==
Confederation	Placement	Team
CAF	2020 CAF Women's Olympic Qualifying Tournament runners-up	Cameroon
CONMEBOL	2018 Copa América Femenina runners-up	Chile

== Format ==
The play-off was played on a two-legged basis, with the order of legs determined by a draw. Originally planned as a home-and-away tie, with each team playing one leg at home, both matches were later moved to a neutral venue. The team that scored more goals on aggregate over the two legs qualified for the Olympics. However, if the aggregate score was level, the away goals rule would still be applied based on the administrative "home" teams determined by the draw (i.e. the team that scored more goals away from "home" over the two legs would qualify). If away goals were also equal, then 30 minutes of extra time would be played. The away goals rule would again be applied after extra time, i.e. if there were goals scored during extra time and the aggregate score was still level, the "away" team would qualify by virtue of more away goals scored. If no goals were scored during extra time, the winners would be decided by a penalty shoot-out.

== Summary ==
The draw for the order of legs was held on 31 January 2020 at the FIFA headquarters in Zürich, Switzerland. The first leg was originally to be held in Cameroon (the participating team from Africa was not known at the time of draw), while the second leg was originally to be held in Chile. The matches were originally scheduled to be played on 9 and 15 April 2020, with the second leg in Chile to take place at the Estadio Tierra de Campeones, Iquique, but were postponed on 17 March 2020 due to the COVID-19 pandemic.

After the Olympics had been postponed to July 2021, on 30 July 2020 FIFA announced the matches were rescheduled to 18 and 24 February 2021. The fixtures were to take place at the Ahmadou Ahidjo Stadium, Yaoundé and Estadio Nacional, Santiago. However, FIFA announced on 4 February 2021 that the matches had been further postponed to the women's international match window in April 2021. It was confirmed on 22 March 2021 that the matches had been moved to Arslan Zeki Demirci Sports Complex, Antalya, Turkey and would be played on 10 and 13 April 2021.

Team 1	Agg.	Team 2	1st leg	2nd leg
Cameroon	1–2	Chile	1–2	0–0

== Matches ==
10 April 2021
18:00 UTC+3

Cameroon	1–2	Chile
Nchout 76'	Report	Sáez 25'; Guerrero 74'

Arslan Zeki Demirci Sports Complex, Antalya
Referee: Anastasia Pustovoitova (Russia
13 April 2021
19:00 UTC+3

Chile	0–0	Cameroon
	Report

Arslan Zeki Demirci Sports Complex, Antalya
Referee: Katalin Kulcsár (Hungary)

Chile won 2–1 on aggregate and qualified for the 2020 Summer Olympics.

== Goalscorers ==
There were 3 goals scored in 2 matches, for an average of 1.5 goals per match.

1 goal

- (Cameroon) Ajara Nchout
- (Chile) Carla Guerrero
- (Chile) Camila Sáez
