= Ashley Lawrence =

Canadian soccer player (born 1995)

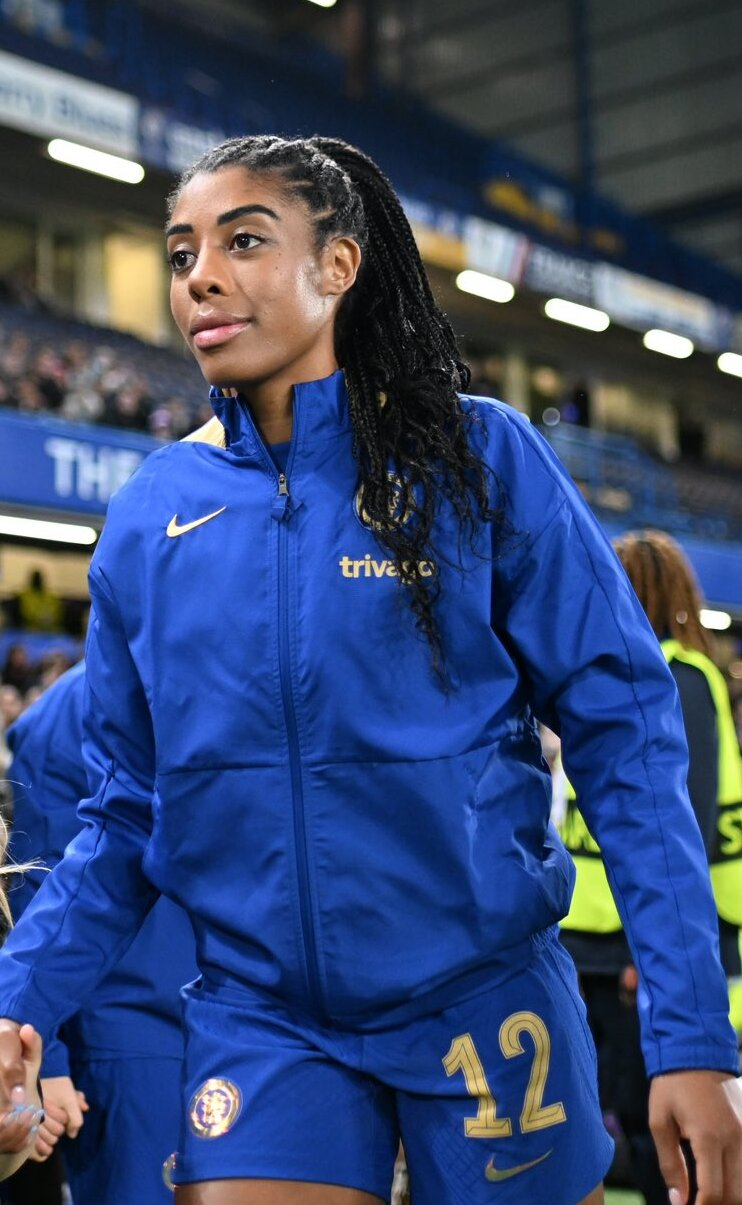
- Lawrence with Chelsea in 2023

Personal information
- Full name: Ashley Elizabeth Marie Lawrence
- Date of birth: June 11, 1995 (age 31)
- Place of birth: Toronto, Ontario, Canada
- Height: 1.68 m (5 ft 6 in)
- Positions: Full-back; midfielder

Team information
- Current team: OL Lyonnes
- Number: 12

Youth career
- Brams United SC
- Erin Mills SC

College career
Years	Team	Apps	(Gls)
2013–2016	West Virginia Mountaineers	91	(17)

Senior career*
Years	Team	Apps	(Gls)
2017–2023	Paris Saint-Germain	112	(7)
2023–2025	Chelsea	37	(2)
2025–	OL Lyonnes	17	(1)

International career^{‡}
2010–2012	Canada U17	11	(0)
2014	Canada U20	4	(0)
2015	Canada U23	4	(0)
2013–	Canada	154	(8)
Medal record
Women's football
Representing Canada
Olympic Games
Gold medal – first place	2020 Tokyo	Team
Bronze medal – third place	2016 Rio de Janeiro	Team
CONCACAF W Championship
Runner-up	2018 United States
Runner-up	2022 Mexico
- * Club domestic league appearances and goals as of May 23, 2026 ‡ National team caps and goals as of October 12, 2026

Ashley Elizabeth Marie Lawrence (born June 11, 1995) is a Canadian professional soccer player who plays as a full-back or a midfielder for Première Ligue club OL Lyonnes and the Canada national team. She has been described as "one of the best attacking full-backs in the world."

== College career ==
Lawrence played college soccer at West Virginia University for the Mountaineers, where she co-captained the team, and won numerous accolades.

== Club career ==
=== Early career ===
While playing for West Virginia University from 2013 to 2016, Ashley Lawrence played for the M-League franchises Toronto Lady Lynx in 2013 and Ottawa Fury in 2014. In June 2016, Lawrence signed with Vaughan Azzurri of League1 Ontario to get more game action prior to the 2016 Rio Olympics. She made her debut on June 26 alongside national teammate Kadeisha Buchanan in a 9–0 win over Darby FA.

=== Paris Saint-Germain ===
Upon graduating from West Virginia University, Lawrence was a highly rated prospect prior to the 2017 NWSL College Draft. In January 2017, Lawrence signed with Paris Saint-Germain in Division 1 Féminine, with a two-year contract. With PSG she reached the final of the UEFA Champions League in her first season, where they only lost on penalties against league rivals Olympique Lyon. She was one of the successful shooters on her team.

As third place in the league, PSG missed the 2017–18 Champions League. In December 2018, Lawrence signed a multi-year contract extension with PSG. In 2018–19, PSG was able to compete again as league runners-up, but were eliminated in the quarter-finals against Chelsea. Lawrence appeared in four of the six games.

In 2020–21 they beat Lyon in the quarter-finals of the Champions League, and were also able to replace Lyon as French champions after 14 championship titles in a row. Lawrence was used in 20 of 22 league games and in 6 Champions League games, which ended with elimination in the semi-finals against eventual winners FC Barcelona.

=== Chelsea F.C. ===
On July 1, 2023, Lawrence signed a three-year deal with Chelsea in the Women's Super League until the summer of 2026. She joined the London-based club after she had represented the Parisians for the past six years. She scored her first goal for Chelsea against Aston Villa on November 4, 2023.

=== Ol Lyonnes ===
In July 2025, the Canadian full-back officially departed Chelsea, signing a three-year contract with Olympique Lyonnais, valid until June 2028.

== International career ==
Lawrence was part of the U-17 and U-20 Canadian youth national teams and took part in the U-17 World Cup in 2010 and 2012 as well as the U-20 World Cup in 2014.

She made her debut for the Canada senior team against China PR during the 2013 Four Nations Tournament on January 12. She took part in the 2013 Cyprus Cup. On November 26, 2014, she was in the starting line-up for the first time in the 1–1 draw against Sweden. She played in the 2015 Four Nations Tournament. She made another starting appearance in the 2015 Cyprus Cup final against England, which was lost 1–0.

She was called up to the squad for the 2015 World Cup hosted by her own country, where she was in the starting line-up for the opening game and also played in the subsequent games. In the last group game against the Netherlands she scored 1-0 and thus her first international and World Cup goal. She and her team were eliminated in the quarter-finals against England.

After the 2015 World Cup, Lawrence took part in the 2015 Pan American Games with the U-23 team, which also took place in her home country and where the Canadians took fourth place. In December 2015, she took part in the four-nation tournament in Brazil with the senior national team, where Canada took second place. She was also part of the squad for the 2016 Summer Olympics qualifying tournament, where Canada qualified. She was used in all games and was only not in the starting line-up in the 10–0 win against Guatemala, when some regular players were rested. In the first game against Guyana, she scored three of Canada's five goals. She was named to the tournament's all-star team as the best left midfielder.

In 2016, she was named to the Olympic team squad for the Summer Games in Rio de Janeiro in August, where she played in all six games (one substitution) and won the bronze medal with the national team.

On May 25, 2019, she was nominated for the 2019 World Cup. She was used in the Canadians' four games and didn't miss a minute, but her team was eliminated in the round of 16 against Sweden, who later came third.

In June 2021, Lawrence was nominated for the Olympic Games, which were postponed by a year due to the COVID-19 pandemic. At the games she was used in the six games and was only substituted nine minutes before the end of the game in the third group game against Great Britain. On August 2, 2021, she played her 100th international match for Canada in the semi-final against the USA. At 116:56 of the Olympic final, she cleared away a Swedish cross on her own goal line to prevent a header goal. Canada went on to win the match in the penalty shoot-out, winning the gold medal with her team.

At the 2022 CONCACAF W Championship, she was used in the three group games, the semi-finals, and the final. By reaching the semi-finals, the Canadians qualified for the 2023 World Cup in Australia and New Zealand. But in the final they lost again to the USA.

On July 9, 2023, Lawrence was nominated for the 2023 World Cup. She played in each of her team's three games, and was eliminated with her team after the preliminary round by Australia.

Lawrence was called up to the Canada squad for the 2024 CONCACAF W Gold Cup, which Canada finished as semifinalists.

Lawrence was called up to the Canada squad for the 2024 Summer Olympics.

== Personal life ==
Her mother, Tina, is originally from Yarmouth, Nova Scotia, while her father is from Jamaica.

== Career statistics ==
=== Club ===
As of match played May 23, 2026

Club	Season	League			Domestic Cup		League Cup		Continental		Other		Total	
Club	Season	Division	Apps	Goals	Apps	Goals	Apps	Goals	Apps	Goals	Apps	Goals	Apps	Goals
Paris Saint-Germain	2016–17	Division 1 Féminine	11	1	5	0	—		5	0	—		21	1
Paris Saint-Germain	2017–18	Division 1 Féminine	21	0	6	0	—		—		—		27	0
Paris Saint-Germain	2018–19	Division 1 Féminine	14	2	2	0	—		4	0	—		20	2
Paris Saint-Germain	2019–20	Division 1 Féminine	9	3	3	1	—		5	0	1 (Note: Appearance(s) in Trophée des Championnes)	0	18	4
Paris Saint-Germain	2020–21	Division 1 Féminine	20	1	1	0	—		6	1	—		27	2
Paris Saint-Germain	2021–22	Division 1 Féminine	17	0	5	2	—		9	0	—		31	2
Paris Saint-Germain	2022–23	Division 1 Féminine	20	0	4	0	—		8	0	1	0	33	0
Paris Saint-Germain	Total		112	7	26	3	0	0	37	1	2	0	177	11
Chelsea	2023–24	Women's Super League	18	1	3	0	0	0	9	0	—		30	1
Chelsea	2024–25	Women's Super League	19	1	2	0	2	0	7	1	—		30	2
Chelsea	Total		37	2	5	0	2	0	16	1	—		60	3
OL Lyonnes	2025–26	Première Ligue	17	1	2	0	3	0	8	0	0	0	31	1
Career total			166	10	33	3	5	0	61	2	2	0	268	15

=== International ===
As of match played October 12, 2026

Appearances and goals by national team and year
National team	Year	Apps	Goals
Canada	2013	7	0
Canada	2014	4	0
Canada	2015	15	1
Canada	2016	20	3
Canada	2017	10	0
Canada	2018	12	1
Canada	2019	15	0
Canada	2020	8	2
Canada	2021	10	0
Canada	2022	12	1
Canada	2023	12	0
Canada	2024	16	0
Canada	2025	10	0
Canada	2026	3	0
Total		154	8

Scores and results list Canada's goal tally first, score column indicates score after each Lawrence goal.

List of international goals scored by Ashley Lawrence
No.	Date	Venue	Opponent	Score	Result	Competition
1	15 June 2015	Montreal, Canada	Netherlands	1–0	1–1	2015 FIFA Women's World Cup
2	11 February 2016	Houston, United States	Guyana	2–0	5–0	2016 CONCACAF Women's Olympic Qualifying Championship
3	11 February 2016	Houston, United States	Guyana	4–0	5–0	2016 CONCACAF Women's Olympic Qualifying Championship
4	11 February 2016	Houston, United States	Guyana	5–0	5–0	2016 CONCACAF Women's Olympic Qualifying Championship
5	7 March 2018	Parchal, Portugal	Japan	2–0	2–0	2018 Algarve Cup
6	29 January 2020	Edinburg, United States	Saint Kitts and Nevis	3–0	11–0	2020 CONCACAF Women's Olympic Qualifying Championship
7	29 January 2020	Edinburg, United States	Saint Kitts and Nevis	9–0	11–0	2020 CONCACAF Women's Olympic Qualifying Championship
8	15 November 2022	São Paulo, Brazil	Brazil	1–1	1–2	Friendly

== Honours ==
Paris Saint-Germain

- Division 1 Féminine: 2020–21
- Coupe de France: 2017–18, 2021–22
- UEFA Women's Champions League runner-up: 2016–17

Chelsea

- Women's Super League: 2023–24, 2024–25
- Women's FA Cup: 2024–25
- FA Women's League Cup: 2024–25

OL Lyonnes

- Première Ligue: 2025–26
- Coupe de France: 2025–26
- Coupe LFFP: 2025–26
- UEFA Women's Champions League runner-up: 2025–26

Canada

- Summer Olympic Games: 2021; bronze medal: 2016
- Algarve Cup: 2016; runner up: 2017
- Four Nations Tournament: 2015

Individual

- IFFHS Women's World Team: 2021
- IFFHS Women's CONCACAF Team of the Year: 2021
- CONCACAF W Gold Cup Best XI: 2024
- CONCACAF Women's Olympic Qualifying Championship Best XI: 2016, 2020
- UNFP Première Ligue team of the year: 2020–21, 2021–22
- Canadian Women's Player of the Year: 2019
- Canadian U-17 Player of the Year: 2011, 2012

== See also ==
- List of women's footballers with 100 or more international caps
