= 2026 Women's League Cup final =

- Event: 2025–26 Women's League Cup
Chelsea	Manchester United
2	0
- Date: 15 March 2026
- Venue: Ashton Gate, Bristol
- Player of the Match: Lauren James (Chelsea)
- Referee: Grace Lowe
- Attendance: 21,619

The 2026 Women's League Cup final was the fifteenth final of the Women's League Cup, England's secondary cup competition for women's football teams and its primary league cup tournament. It took place on 15 March 2026, at Ashton Gate, and was contested by Chelsea and Manchester United. Chelsea made their seventh consecutive (and seventh overall) appearance in a League Cup final, having won the previous edition. Manchester United contested their first League Cup final.

Chelsea won the match 2–0 and clinched their fourth title.

== Route to the final ==
Note: In all results below, the score of the finalist is given first.

Chelsea
Round	Opposition	Score
GS	Bye	
QF	Liverpool (A)	9–1
SF	Manchester City (A)	1–0
Key: (H) = Home; (A) = Away

Manchester United
Round	Opposition	Score
GS	Bye	
QF	Tottenham Hotspur (H)	2–1
SF	Arsenal (A)	1–0
Key: (H) = Home; (A) = Away

=== Chelsea ===
Chelsea entered the competition in the knockout stage due to their participation in the UEFA Women's Champions League.

In the quarter-final, they were drawn away to Liverpool.

=== Manchester United ===
Manchester United entered the competition in the knockout stage due to their participation in the UEFA Women's Champions League.

In the quarter-final, they were drawn at home to Tottenham Hotspur.

== Match ==
=== Details ===
15 March 2026
14:15 GMT

Chelsea	2–0	Manchester United
James 19'; Beever-Jones 76'	Report

Ashton Gate, Bristol
Attendance: 21,619
Referee: Grace Lowe

Chelsea	Manchester United

GK	24	(England) Hannah Hampton
LB	17	(France) Sandy Baltimore
LCB	5	(Netherlands) Veerle Buurman
RCB	26	(Canada) Kadeisha Buchanan		(substituted off) 62'
RB	22	(England) Lucy Bronze
LCM	6	(Germany) Sjoeke Nüsken
CM	30	(England) Keira Walsh
RCM	8	(Scotland) Erin Cuthbert (c)
LW	12	(United States) Alyssa Thompson		(substituted off) 46'
FW	10	(England) Lauren James	(yellow card) 56'	(substituted off) 90+1'
RW	19	(Sweden) Johanna Rytting Kaneryd
Substitutes:
GK	38	(Jamaica) Becky Spencer
LCB	14	(Sweden) Nathalie Björn		(substituted on) 62'	(substituted off) 67'
MF	18	(Netherlands) Wieke Kaptein		(substituted on) 67'
GK	1	(Switzerland) Livia Peng
MF	32	(England) Lexi Potter		(substituted on) 90+1'
DF	42	(England) Chloe Sarwie
FW	33	(England) Aggie Beever-Jones		(substituted on) 46'
Manager:
(France) Sonia Bompastor

GK	91	(United States) Phallon Tullis-Joyce
LB	5	(Sweden) Hanna Lundkvist
LCB	17	(Netherlands) Dominique Janssen
RCB	4	(England) Maya Le Tissier (c)
RB	14	(Canada) Jayde Riviere	(substituted off) 59'
LCM	10	(Norway) Elisabeth Terland
RCM	18	(Sweden) Julia Zigiotti Olme	(substituted off) 86'
LW	9	(France) Melvine Malard
CAM	16	(Norway) Lisa Naalsund
RW	8	(England) Jess Park
FW	19	(Sweden) Ellen Wangerheim	(substituted off) 59'
Substitutes:
GK	1	(England) Kayla Rendell
GK	39	(Wales) Safia Middleton-Patel
DF	3	(England) Gabby George
MF	47	(England) Jessica Anderson
MF	13	(Canada) Simi Awujo	(substituted on) 86'
FW	57	(England) Layla Drury
FW	12	(Sweden) Fridolina Rolfö	(substituted on) 59'
FW	24	(Germany) Lea Schüller	(substituted on) 59'
DF	21	(England) Millie Turner
Manager:
(England) Marc Skinner

Player of the Match:
Lauren James (Chelsea)

Assistant referees:
Isabel Chaplin
Jon Ashworth-Sears
Fourth official:
Ross Martin
Video assistant referee:
Timothy Wood
Assistant video assistant referee:
Nick Hopton

Match rules

- 90 minutes.
- 30 minutes of extra-time if necessary.
- Penalty shoot-out if scores still level.
- Nine named substitutes.
- Maximum of five substitutions in three stoppages.
