= 2025–26 Chelsea F.C. Women season =

English football club season

Chelsea
2025–26 season
- Chairman: Adrian Jacob
- Manager: Sonia Bompastor
- Stadium: Kingsmeadow
- FA WSL: 3rd
- FA Cup: Semi-final
- League Cup: Winners
- Champions League: Quarter-final
- Top goalscorer: League: Sam Kerr; Alyssa Thompson (7 each); All: Sam Kerr (17)
- Biggest win: 9–1 (vs. Liverpool, 21 December 2025, League Cup)
- Biggest defeat: 1–5 (vs. Manchester City, 1 February 2026, WSL)
Home colours	Away colours	Third colours
- All statistics correct as of 16 May 2026.

The 2025–26 season was Chelsea Women's 34th competitive season and 16th consecutive season in the FA Women's Super League, the top flight of English women's football. Chelsea competed in the domestic league as six-time defending champions since the 2019–20 season, as well as defending champions in both the Women's FA Cup and Women's League Cup. Chelsea finished 3rd in the league, relinquishing the title to Manchester City and won their only trophy in the League Cup against Manchester United. Sam Kerr departed the club after six years and winning eleven trophies with the club, having spent a majority of the previous two years on the sidelines; she equalled the club goalscoring record set by Fran Kirby in their last league game against United.

== Squad information ==
=== First team squad ===
As of 29 April 2026

No.	Name	Nat	Since	Date of birth (age)	Signed from
Goalkeepers
1	Livia Peng	(Switzerland)	2025	14 March 2002 (age 24)	(Germany) Werder Bremen
24	Hannah Hampton	(England)	2023	16 November 2000 (age 25)	(England) Aston Villa
38	Becky Spencer	(Jamaica)	2025	22 February 1991 (age 35)	(England) Tottenham Hotspur
Defenders
2	Ellie Carpenter	(Australia)	2025	28 April 2000 (age 26)	(France) Lyon
5	Veerle Buurman	(Netherlands)	2024	21 April 2006 (age 20)	(Netherlands) PSV
14	Nathalie Björn	(Sweden)	2024	4 May 1997 (age 29)	(England) Everton
16	Naomi Girma	(United States)	2025	14 June 2000 (age 26)	(United States) San Diego Wave FC
21	Niamh Charles	(England)	2020	21 June 1999 (age 27)	(England) Liverpool
22	Lucy Bronze	(England)	2024	28 October 1991 (age 34)	(Spain) Barcelona
26	Kadeisha Buchanan	(Canada)	2022	5 November 1995 (age 30)	(France) Lyon
Midfielders
6	Sjoeke Nüsken	(Germany)	2023	22 January 2001 (age 25)	(Germany) Eintracht Frankfurt
8	Erin Cuthbert	(Scotland)	2016	19 July 1998 (age 28)	(Scotland) Glasgow City
18	Wieke Kaptein	(Netherlands)	2023	29 August 2005 (age 20)	(Netherlands) Twente
19	Johanna Rytting Kaneryd	(Sweden)	2022	12 February 1997 (age 29)	(Sweden) BK Häcken
30	Keira Walsh	(England)	2025	8 April 1997 (age 29)	(Spain) Barcelona
32	Lexi Potter	(England)	2023	17 August 2006 (age 19)	Homegrown
Forwards
7	Mayra Ramírez	(Colombia)	2024	23 March 1999 (age 27)	(Spain) Levante
10	Lauren James	(England)	2021	29 September 2001 (age 24)	(England) Manchester United
12	Alyssa Thompson	(United States)	2025	7 November 2004 (age 21)	(United States) Angel City FC
17	Sandy Baltimore	(France)	2024	19 February 2000 (age 26)	(France) Paris Saint-Germain
20	Sam Kerr	(Australia)	2019	10 September 1993 (age 32)	(United States) Chicago Red Stars
33	Aggie Beever-Jones	(England)	2021	27 July 2003 (age 22)	Homegrown

=== New contracts ===
No.	Pos	Player/Manager	Date	Contract end	Source
19	MF	(Sweden) Johanna Rytting Kaneryd	4 June 2025	2027	
—	MF	(England) Ashanti Akpan	27 June 2025	2026	
31	FW	(England) Aimee Claypole	27 June 2025	2026	
23	FW	(Japan) Maika Hamano	11 September 2025	2029	
6	MF	(Germany) Sjoeke Nüsken	6 October 2025	2027	
42	DF	(England) Chloe Sarwie	24 February 2026	2028	
10	FW	(England) Lauren James	13 March 2026	2030	

== Transfers and loans ==
=== In ===
Pos	Player	Transferred From	Fee	Date	Source
GK	(Switzerland) Livia Peng	(Germany) Werder Bremen	Undisclosed	10 June 2025	
FW	(Germany) Mara Alber	(Germany) TSG Hoffenheim	Undisclosed	11 June 2025	
DF	(Australia) Ellie Carpenter	(France) Lyon	Undisclosed	2 July 2025	
GK	(Jamaica) Becky Spencer	(England) Tottenham Hotspur	Undisclosed	7 July 2025	
FW	(United States) Alyssa Thompson	(United States) Angel City FC	Undisclosed	5 September 2025	

=== Out ===
Pos	Player	Transferred To	Fee	Date	Source
MF	(Wales) Sophie Ingle	(England) Bristol City	Free	18 May 2025	
GK	(Sweden) Zećira Mušović	(Sweden) Malmö FF	Free	18 May 2025	
DF	(England) Greta Humphries	(England) Portsmouth	Free	27 June 2025	
FW	(England) Lucy Watson	(England) Durham	Free	27 June 2025	
DF	(Canada) Ashley Lawrence	(France) Lyon	Undisclosed	1 July 2025	
DF	(Netherlands) Aniek Nouwen	(Netherlands) PSV	Undisclosed	5 July 2025	
FW	(United States) Mia Fishel	(United States) Seattle Reign FC	Undisclosed	10 July 2025	
FW	(England) Aimee Claypole	(England) Nottingham Forest	Undisclosed	1 August 2025	
DF	(France) Maelys Mpomé	(England) Brighton & Hove Albion	Undisclosed	11 August 2025	
DF	(Spain) Alejandra Bernabé	(England) Liverpool	Undisclosed	4 September 2025	
MF	(France) Oriane Jean-François	(England) Aston Villa	Undisclosed	12 January 2026	
MF	(England) Ashanti Akpan	(England) Newcastle United	Undisclosed	23 January 2026	
FW	(United States) Catarina Macario	(United States) San Diego Wave FC	Undisclosed	27 March 2026	
DF	(England) Millie Bright	Retired	N/A	29 April 2026	

=== Loan out ===
Pos	Player	To	Date	Until	Source
MF	(England) Vera Jones	(England) Bristol City	5 August 2025	End of season	
MF	(England) Lola Brown	(England) Crystal Palace	7 August 2025	End of season	
GK	(England) Katie Cox	(Scotland) Aberdeen	8 August 2025	End of season	
MF	(England) Ashanti Akpan	(England) Southampton	22 August 2025	9 January 2026	
MF	(Spain) Júlia Bartel	(Spain) Atlético Madrid	26 August 2025	End of season	
FW	(France) Louna Ribadeira	(France) Fleury	2 September 2025	End of season	
GK	(Netherlands) Femke Liefting	(England) Newcastle United	4 September 2025	End of season	
DF	(England) Jorja Fox	(England) Newcastle United	4 September 2025	End of season	
FW	(Japan) Maika Hamano	(England) Tottenham Hotspur	4 January 2026	End of season	
FW	(Germany) Mara Alber	(Germany) Werder Bremen	6 January 2026	End of season	
MF	(Norway) Guro Reiten	(United States) Gotham FC	12 March 2026	End of season	

== Management team ==
Position	Staff
Manager	(France) Sonia Bompastor
Assistant manager	(England) Paul Green
Assistant coach	(France) Camille Abily
Assistant coach	(France) Theo Rivrin
Coach	(England) Gemma Davison
Goalkeeping coach	(England) Seb Brown
Assistant goalkeeping coach	(England) Dan Smith
Movement coach	(England) Harry McCulloch
Match analyst	(England) Jamie Cook
Opposition analyst	(England) Jack Stephens
Scouting co-ordinator and academy coach	(England) TJ O'Leary

Source: Chelsea F.C.

== Kits ==
Home	Home alt.	Away	Away alt. 1	Away alt. 2	Away alt. 3	Third
Goalkeeper 1	Goalkeeper 2	Goalkeeper 3

== Pre-season ==
17 August 2025 Friendly	Ajax (Netherlands)	1–1	(England) Chelsea	Ouder-Amstel, Netherlands
15:00 CEST	Tolhoek 90+3'	Report	Reiten 69'	Stadium: Sportpark De Toekomst; Attendance: 0 (behind closed doors); Referee: Leon Welbers

30 August 2025 Friendly	Chelsea (England)	4–1	(Italy) AC Milan	Kingston upon Thames
13:00	Beever-Jones 16', 45+4', 62'; Rytting Kaneryd 85'	Report	Ijeh 26'	Stadium: Kingsmeadow

== Competitions ==
=== Women's Super League ===
==== League table ====
Pos	Team	Pld	W	D	L	GF	GA	GD	Pts	Qualification or relegation
1	Manchester City (C)	22	18	1	3	62	19	+43	55	Qualification for the Champions League league phase
2	Arsenal	22	15	6	1	53	14	+39	51	Qualification for the Champions League league phase
3	Chelsea	22	15	4	3	44	20	+24	49	Qualification for the Champions League third qualifying round
4	Manchester United	22	11	7	4	38	22	+16	40	
5	Tottenham Hotspur	22	11	3	8	35	38	−3	36	

Source: WSL League Table
Rules for classification: 1) Points; 2) Goal difference; 3) Number of goals scored.
(C) Champions

==== Results summary ====
Overall								Home						Away					
Pld	W	D	L	GF	GA	GD	Pts	W	D	L	GF	GA	GD	W	D	L	GF	GA	GD
22	15	4	3	44	20	+24	49	9	0	2	20	8	+12	6	4	1	24	12	+12

Source: FA WSL

==== Results by matchday ====
Matchday	1	2	3	4	5	6	7	8	9	10	11	12	13	14	15	16	17	18	19	20	21	22
Result	W	W	W	W	D	W	W	D	D	L	W	W	L	L	W	W	W	D	W	W	W	W
Position	4	3	1	1	1	1	1	2	2	2	2	2	2	3	3	3	2	3	2	2	2	3

Source: FA WSL
W = Win; D = Draw; L = Loss

==== Matches ====
5 September 2025 1	Chelsea	2–1	Manchester City	Fulham
19:30 BST	Beever-Jones 31'; Hamano 64'	Report	Lohmann (yellow card) 56'; Charles 70' (o.g.)	Stadium: Stamford Bridge; Attendance: 14,182; Referee: Emily Heaslip

14 September 2025 2	Aston Villa	1–3	Chelsea	Aston
12:00 BST	Salmon 34'	Report	Beever-Jones 22'; Kearns 55' (o.g.); Baltimore (yellow card) 63'; Kerr 90+3'; Bright (yellow card) 90+5'	Stadium: Villa Park; Attendance: 4,994; Referee: Stacey Pearson

21 September 2025 3	Chelsea	1–0	Leicester City	Kingston upon Thames
12:00 BST	Beever-Jones 7'; Cuthbert (yellow card) 37'; Walsh (yellow card) 90+1'	Report	Thibaud (yellow card) 12'; Van Egmond (yellow card) 34'; Payne (yellow card) 81'	Stadium: Kingsmeadow; Attendance: 2,886; Referee: Melissa Burgin

28 September 2025 4	West Ham United	0–4	Chelsea	Dagenham
14:30 BST	Zadorsky (yellow card) 7'; Belloumou (red card) 23'; Nyström (yellow card) 77'	Report	Beever-Jones 8'; Rytting Kaneryd 12'; Cuthbert 15'; Bright (yellow card) 31'; Björn (yellow card) 51'; Kaptein 70'	Stadium: Victoria Road; Attendance: 2,423; Referee: Callum Jones

3 October 2025 5	Manchester United	1–1	Chelsea	Leigh
19:30 BST	Sandberg 20'; Zigiotti Olme (yellow card) 53'	Report	Kaptein 9'	Stadium: Leigh Sports Village; Attendance: 5,105; Referee: Abigail Byrne

12 October 2025 6	Chelsea	1–0	Tottenham Hotspur	Kingston upon Thames
12:00 BST	Carpenter (yellow card) 15'; Walsh 61'; Bright (yellow card) 71'	Report	Nildén (yellow card) 63'	Stadium: Kingsmeadow; Attendance: 3,925; Referee: Grace Lowe

1 November 2025 7	Chelsea	2–0	London City Lionesses	Fulham
12:00 GMT	Carpenter 6'; Cuthbert (yellow card) 38'; Kerr 90+4'	Report	Sangaré (yellow card) 62'	Stadium: Stamford Bridge; Attendance: 10,441; Referee: Kirsty Dowle

8 November 2025 8	Arsenal	1–1	Chelsea	Holloway
12:00 GMT	McCabe (yellow card) 55'; Pelova (yellow card) 64'; Russo 87'	Report	Thompson 9'	Stadium: Emirates Stadium; Attendance: 56,537; Referee: Melissa Burgin

16 November 2025 9	Liverpool	1–1	Chelsea	St Helens
12:00 GMT	Olsson 33'; Fisk (yellow card) 75'	Report	Thompson 9'	Stadium: BrewDog Stadium; Attendance: 3,688; Referee: Edward Duckworth

7 December 2025 10	Chelsea	0–1	Everton	Kingston upon Thames
14:30 GMT		Report	Hayashi 12'; Hobson (yellow card) 90'; Ishikawa (yellow card) 90+3'	Stadium: Kingsmeadow; Attendance: 3,327; Referee: Emily Heaslip

14 December 2025 11	Brighton & Hove Albion	0–3	Chelsea	Crawley
11:55 GMT	Haley (yellow card) 65'	Report	Baltimore 42', (yellow card) 67'; Hayes 51' (o.g.); Thompson 73'; Walsh (yellow card) 90+3'	Stadium: Broadfield Stadium; Attendance: 3,493; Referee: Sophie Dennington

11 January 2026 12	Chelsea	5–0	West Ham United	Kingston upon Thames
12:00 GMT	Endo 1' (o.g.); James 28', (yellow card) 36'; Thompson 40'; Baltimore 44', 70' (pen.)	Report	Asseyi (yellow card) 80'	Stadium: Kingsmeadow; Attendance: 3,335; Referee: Stacey Pearson

24 January 2026 13	Chelsea	0–2	Arsenal	Fulham
12:30 GMT		Report	Mead (yellow card) 15', (goal) 55'; Caldentey 61'	Stadium: Stamford Bridge; Attendance: 30,545; Referee: Kirsty Dowle

1 February 2026 14	Manchester City	5–1	Chelsea	Manchester
14:30 GMT	Kerolin 13', 49', 54'; Shaw 36'; Miedema 72'	Report	Thompson 68'	Stadium: City of Manchester Stadium; Attendance: 13,228; Referee: Melissa Burgin

8 February 2026 15	Tottenham Hotspur	0–2	Chelsea	Tottenham
14:30 GMT	Tandberg (yellow card) 80'; Dennis (yellow card) 89'	Report	Walsh 39'; Thompson 49'	Stadium: Tottenham Hotspur Stadium; Attendance: 9,356; Referee: Phoebe Cross

15 February 2026 16	Chelsea	2–0	Liverpool	Kingston upon Thames
12:00 GMT	Nüsken 40'; James 65', (yellow card) 79'	Report		Stadium: Kingsmeadow; Attendance: 3,973; Referee: Sophie Dennington

18 March 2026 17	Chelsea	2–1	Brighton & Hove Albion	Kingston upon Thames
19:00 GMT	Thompson 13'; Nüsken (yellow card) 32'; Kaptein (yellow card) 34'; Potter 39'; Bronze (yellow card) 72'	Report	Camacho 17'; Vanegas (yellow card) 20'; Rayner (yellow card) 56'; Mpomé (yellow card) 80'	Stadium: Kingsmeadow; Attendance: 2,581; Referee: Stacey Pearson
Note: This fixture, originally scheduled for 15 March 2026, was rescheduled due to Chelsea's participation in the 2026 League Cup final.

21 March 2026 18	London City Lionesses	1–1	Chelsea	Bermondsey
12:00 GMT	Marcetto (yellow card) 29'; Parris (yellow card) 49'; Goodwin 82'	Report	Rytting Kaneryd 22'; Walsh (yellow card) 84'; Thompson (yellow card) 87'	Stadium: The Den; Attendance: 4,820; Referee: Emily Heaslip

29 March 2026 19	Chelsea	4–3	Aston Villa	Kingston upon Thames
12:00 BST	Kerr 20'; Girma 23'; James 27'; Nüsken 82'	Report	Grant 2'; Hanson 31', 35'; Nighswonger (yellow card) 90+6'	Stadium: Kingsmeadow; Attendance: 3,470; Referee: Callum Jones

26 April 2026 20	Everton	1–4	Chelsea	Liverpool
12:00 BST	Momiki 10'; Stenevik (yellow card) 87'	Report	Kerr 6', 47'; Charles (yellow card) 44'; Carpenter 53'; Cuthbert 70'	Stadium: Goodison Park; Attendance: 2,751; Referee: Ross Martin

3 May 2026 21	Leicester City	1–3	Chelsea	Leicester
14:30 BST	O'Brien 42'; Neville (yellow card) 76'	Report	Kerr 13'; James 27', 33'	Stadium: King Power Stadium; Attendance: 3,992; Referee: Adewunmi Soneye

16 May 2026 22	Chelsea	1–0	Manchester United	Fulham
13:00 BST	Kerr 34'; Buurman (yellow card) 90+11'	Report	George (yellow card) 23'; Tullis-Joyce (yellow card) 90+10'	Stadium: Stamford Bridge; Attendance: 15,040; Referee: Melissa Burgin

=== FA Cup ===
17 January 2026 Fourth round proper	Chelsea	5–0	Crystal Palace	Kingston upon Thames
12:30 GMT	Bright 13'; Kerr 22', 51'; Reiten 29' (pen.); Kaptein (yellow card) 39'; Thompson 70'	Report		Stadium: Kingsmeadow; Referee: Stacey Fullicks

22 February 2026 Fifth round proper	Chelsea	2–1 (a.e.t.)	Manchester United	Kingston upon Thames
13:30 GMT	Kerr 78'; James (yellow card) 83'; Girma 99'	Report	Janssen (yellow card) 77'; Awujo 81'; Le Tissier (yellow card) 110'	Stadium: Kingsmeadow; Attendance: 2,964; Referee: Phoebe Cross

6 April 2026 Quarter-final	Chelsea	2–1	Tottenham Hotspur	Kingston upon Thames
13:30 BST	Kerr 40'; Buurman 86'	Report	Spence (yellow card) 15'; A. Nildén (yellow card) 27'; Tandberg (yellow card) 33'; Summanen 52'	Stadium: Kingsmeadow; Attendance: 2,736; Referee: Stacey Pearson

10 May 2026 Semi-final	Chelsea	2–3 (a.e.t.)	Manchester City	Fulham
15:30 BST	Cuthbert 8'; Kerr 59'; James (yellow card) 79'	Report	Fowler 86'; Shaw 90+1', 103'; Fujino (yellow card) 97'	Stadium: Stamford Bridge; Attendance: 7,773; Referee: Phoebe Cross

=== League Cup ===
==== Knockout phase ====
21 December 2025 Quarter-final	Liverpool	1–9	Chelsea	St Helens
13:00 GMT	Olsson (yellow card) 27'; Clark 72'	Report	Kerr 13', 17'; Kaptein 21'; Beever-Jones 32'; Rytting Kaneryd 53', 73', 80'; Nüsken 76'; Bright 86'	Stadium: BrewDog Stadium; Attendance: 2,467; Referee: Grace Lowe

21 January 2026 Semi-final	Manchester City	0–1	Chelsea	Manchester
19:00 GMT	Casparij (yellow card) 80'	Report	Bronze (yellow card) 21'; Kaptein 41'	Stadium: Academy Stadium; Attendance: 1,967; Referee: Phoebe Cross

15 March 2026 Final	Chelsea	2–0	Manchester United	Bristol
14:15 GMT	James 19', (yellow card) 56'; Beever-Jones 77'	Report		Stadium: Ashton Gate; Attendance: 21,619; Referee: Grace Lowe

=== UEFA Women's Champions League ===
==== League phase ====
Pos	Team	Pld	W	D	L	GF	GA	GD	Pts	Qualification
1	(Royal Spanish Football Federation) Barcelona	6	5	1	0	20	3	+17	16	Advance to the quarter-finals (seeded)
2	(French Football Federation) OL Lyonnes	6	5	1	0	18	5	+13	16	Advance to the quarter-finals (seeded)
3	(The Football Association) Chelsea	6	4	2	0	20	3	+17	14	Advance to the quarter-finals (seeded)
4	(German Football Association) Bayern Munich	6	4	1	1	14	13	+1	13	Advance to the quarter-finals (seeded)
5	(The Football Association) Arsenal	6	4	0	2	11	6	+5	12	Advance to the knockout phase play-offs (seeded)

Source: UEFA
Rules for classification: League phase tiebreakers

8 October 2025 1	Twente (Netherlands)	1–1	(England) Chelsea	Enschede
18:45 CEST	Van Ginkel 63'	Report	Baltimore 71' (pen.)	Stadium: De Grolsch Veste; Attendance: 4,193; Referee: Marta Huerta de Aza (Spain)

15 October 2025 2	Chelsea (England)	4–0	(France) Paris FC	Fulham
20:00 BST	Baltimore 31' (pen.); Rytting Kaneryd 39'; Thompson 47'; Cuthbert 63'	Report		Stadium: Stamford Bridge; Attendance: 2,752; Referee: Michalina Diakow (Poland)

11 November 2025 3	St. Pölten (Austria)	0–6	(England) Chelsea	Sankt Pölten
21:00 CET	Križaj (yellow card) 38'; Nagy (yellow card) 45+3'	Report	Kaptein 13'; Macario 44', 53' (pen.); Kerr 75', 90+2'; Ebert 86' (o.g.)	Stadium: NV Arena; Attendance: 2,431; Referee: Franziska Wildfeuer (Germany)

20 November 2025 4	Chelsea (England)	1–1	(Spain) Barcelona	Fulham
20:00 GMT	Carpenter 16'	Report	Pajor 24'	Stadium: Stamford Bridge; Attendance: 11,137; Referee: Tess Olofsson (Sweden)

10 December 2025 5	Chelsea (England)	6–0	(Italy) Roma	Fulham
20:00 GMT	Bergamaschi 13' (o.g.); Kaptein 26'; Rytting Kaneryd 44'; Nüsken 51' (pen.); Hamano 76'; Bronze 86'	Report		Stadium: Stamford Bridge; Attendance: 3,914; Referee: Ewa Augustyn (Poland)

17 December 2025 6	VfL Wolfsburg (Germany)	1–2	(England) Chelsea	Wolfsburg
21:00 CET	Popp 16'; Lattwein (yellow card) 72'	Report	Bright (yellow card) 8'; Bronze 45'; Kerr 64'; Baltimore (yellow card) 70'	Stadium: AOK Stadion; Attendance: 2,627; Referee: Silvia Gasperotti (Italy)

==== Quarter-finals ====
24 March 2026 First leg	Arsenal (England)	3–1	(England) Chelsea	Holloway
20:00 GMT	Blackstenius 22'; Kelly 32'; Codina (yellow card) 35'; Russo 76'	Report	James (yellow card) 28', (goal) 66'	Stadium: Emirates Stadium; Attendance: 18,087; Referee: Alina Peşu (Romania)

1 April 2026 Second leg	Chelsea (England)	1–0 (2–3 agg.)	(England) Arsenal	Fulham
20:00 BST	Carpenter (yellow card) 48'; James (yellow card) 62'; Nüsken 90+4'; Bompastor (yellow card) 90+6' (yellow-red card) 90+7'	Report	Hinds (yellow card) 66'	Stadium: Stamford Bridge; Attendance: 16,117; Referee: Frida Klarlund (Denmark)

== Statistics ==
=== Appearances and goals ===
As of 16 May 2026

No.	Pos	Nat	Player	Total		WSL		FA Cup		League Cup		Champions League	
No.	Pos	Nat	Player	Apps	Goals	Apps	Goals	Apps	Goals	Apps	Goals	Apps	Goals
Goalkeepers:
1	GK	(Switzerland) SUI	Livia Peng	11	0	4+1	0	0	0	1	0	5	0
24	GK	(England) ENG	Hannah Hampton	27	0	18	0	4	0	2	0	3	0
38	GK	(Jamaica) JAM	Becky Spencer	0	0	0	0	0	0	0	0	0	0
Defenders:
2	DF	(Australia) AUS	Ellie Carpenter	29	3	18+1	2	3+1	0	1	0	5	1
5	DF	(Netherlands) NED	Veerle Buurman	24	1	11+2	0	3+1	1	2	0	4+1	0
14	DF	(Sweden) SWE	Nathalie Björn	12	0	9	0	0	0	0+1	0	2	0
16	DF	(United States) USA	Naomi Girma	18	2	8+2	1	3	1	1	0	4	0
21	DF	(England) ENG	Niamh Charles	18	0	8+3	0	2	0	1	0	1+3	0
22	DF	(England) ENG	Lucy Bronze	25	2	9+4	0	1+2	0	2	0	6+1	2
26	DF	(Canada) CAN	Kadeisha Buchanan	11	0	3+2	0	2+1	0	1	0	2	0
42	DF	(England) ENG	Chloe Sarwie	7	0	1+4	0	0+1	0	0	0	0+1	0
Midfielders:
6	MF	(Germany) GER	Sjoeke Nüsken	29	5	9+6	2	3+1	0	3	1	4+3	2
8	MF	(Scotland) SCO	Erin Cuthbert	33	4	18+3	2	4	1	2	0	5+1	1
18	MF	(Netherlands) NED	Wieke Kaptein	35	6	14+6	2	1+3	0	2+1	2	4+4	2
19	MF	(Sweden) SWE	Johanna Rytting Kaneryd	31	7	11+8	2	2+1	0	2+1	3	3+3	2
30	MF	(England) ENG	Keira Walsh	31	2	18+2	2	3	0	1	0	7	0
32	MF	(England) ENG	Lexi Potter	14	1	3+5	1	0+1	0	1+1	0	0+3	0
Forwards:
7	FW	(Colombia) COL	Mayra Ramírez	1	0	0+1	0	0	0	0	0	0	0
10	FW	(England) ENG	Lauren James	25	7	11+3	5	4	0	1+2	1	3+1	1
12	FW	(United States) USA	Alyssa Thompson	33	9	16+4	7	4	1	2	0	7	1
17	FW	(France) FRA	Sandy Baltimore	34	5	11+10	3	0+3	0	2	0	7+1	2
20	FW	(Australia) AUS	Sam Kerr	30	17	5+13	7	3+1	5	2	2	4+2	3
33	FW	(England) ENG	Aggie Beever-Jones	24	6	11+6	4	0+1	0	1+1	2	3+1	0
Players away from the club on loan:
11	MF	(Norway) NOR	Guro Reiten	17	1	3+7	0	1+1	1	1+1	0	1+2	0
23	FW	(Japan) JPN	Maika Hamano	8	2	2+2	1	0	0	0+1	0	1+2	1
Players who appeared for the club but left during the season:
4	DF	(England) ENG	Millie Bright	21	2	14	0	1	1	2	1	4	0
9	FW	(United States) USA	Catarina Macário	12	2	6+3	0	0	0	0	0	2+1	2
27	MF	(France) FRA	Oriane Jean-François	7	0	1+4	0	0	0	0	0	1+1	0

- Source: Chelsea F.C.

=== Goalscorers ===
Includes all competitive matches. The list is sorted by squad number when total goals are equal.

As of 16 May 2026

Rank	Pos.	No.	Player	FA WSL	FA Cup	League Cup	Champions League	Total
1	FW	20	(Australia) Sam Kerr	7	5	2	3	17
2	FW	12	(United States) Alyssa Thompson	7	1	0	1	9
3	FW	10	(England) Lauren James	5	0	1	1	7
3	MF	19	(Sweden) Johanna Rytting Kaneryd	2	0	3	2	7
5	MF	18	(Netherlands) Wieke Kaptein	2	0	2	2	6
5	FW	33	(England) Aggie Beever-Jones	4	0	2	0	6
7	MF	6	(Germany) Sjoeke Nüsken	2	0	1	2	5
7	FW	17	(France) Sandy Baltimore	3	0	0	2	5
9	MF	8	(Scotland) Erin Cuthbert	2	1	0	1	4
10	DF	2	(Australia) Ellie Carpenter	2	0	0	1	3
11	DF	4	(England) Millie Bright	0	1	1	0	2
11	FW	9	(United States) Catarina Macario	0	0	0	2	2
11	DF	16	(United States) Naomi Girma	1	1	0	0	2
11	DF	22	(England) Lucy Bronze	0	0	0	2	2
11	FW	23	(Japan) Maika Hamano	1	0	0	1	2
11	MF	30	(England) Keira Walsh	2	0	0	0	2
17	DF	5	(Netherlands) Veerle Buurman	0	1	0	0	1
17	MF	11	(Norway) Guro Reiten	0	1	0	0	1
17	MF	32	(England) Lexi Potter	1	0	0	0	1
Own goal(s)				3	0	0	2	5
Total				44	11	12	22	89

=== Clean sheets ===
Includes all competitive matches. The list is sorted by squad number when total clean sheets are equal.

As of 10 May 2026

Rank	Pos.	No.	Player	FA WSL	FA Cup	League Cup	Champions League	Total
1	GK	24	(England) Hannah Hampton	7	1	2	2	12
2	GK	1	(Switzerland) Livia Peng	1	0	0	2	3
Total				8	1	2	4	15

=== Disciplinary records ===
Includes all competitive matches. The list is sorted by squad number when total clean sheets are equal.

As of 16 May 2026

Pos.	No.	Name	FA WSL			FA Cup			League Cup			Champions League			Total		
Pos.	No.	Name	Booked	(yellow card) (yellow-red card)	Sent off (straight red)	Booked	(yellow card) (yellow-red card)	Sent off (straight red)	Booked	(yellow card) (yellow-red card)	Sent off (straight red)	Booked	(yellow card) (yellow-red card)	Sent off (straight red)	Booked	(yellow card) (yellow-red card)	Sent off (straight red)
2	DF	(Australia) Ellie Carpenter	1	0	0	0	0	0	0	0	0	1	0	0	2	0	0
4	DF	(England) Millie Bright	3	0	0	0	0	0	0	0	0	1	0	0	4	0	0
5	DF	(Netherlands) Veerle Buurman	1	0	0	0	0	0	0	0	0	0	0	0	1	0	0
6	MF	(Germany) Sjoeke Nüsken	1	0	0	0	0	0	0	0	0	0	0	0	1	0	0
8	MF	(Scotland) Erin Cuthbert	2	0	0	0	0	0	0	0	0	0	0	0	2	0	0
10	FW	(England) Lauren James	2	0	0	2	0	0	1	0	0	2	0	0	6	0	0
12	FW	(United States) Alyssa Thompson	1	0	0	0	0	0	0	0	0	0	0	0	1	0	0
14	DF	(Sweden) Nathalie Björn	1	0	0	0	0	0	0	0	0	0	0	0	1	0	0
17	FW	(France) Sandy Baltimore	2	0	0	0	0	0	0	0	0	1	0	0	3	0	0
18	MF	(Netherlands) Wieke Kaptein	1	0	0	1	0	0	0	0	0	0	0	0	2	0	0
21	DF	(England) Niamh Charles	1	0	0	0	0	0	0	0	0	0	0	0	1	0	0
22	DF	(England) Lucy Bronze	1	0	0	0	0	0	1	0	0	0	0	0	2	0	0
30	MF	(England) Keira Walsh	3	0	0	0	0	0	0	0	0	0	0	0	3	0	0
Total			20	0	0	3	0	0	2	0	0	5	0	0	30	0	0
