= 2026–27 Chelsea F.C. Women season =

Chelsea
2026–27 season
- Chairman: Adrian Jacob
- Manager: Sonia Bompastor
- Stadium: Stamford Bridge (league matches); Plough Lane (cup matches)
- FA WSL: 1st
- FA Cup: Fourth round
- Champions League: League phase
- Top goalscorer: League: Melvine Malard (6); All: Melvine Malard (8)
- Biggest win: 6–0 (vs. Charlton Athletic, 1 November 2026, WSL)
Home colours	Away colours	Third colours
- All statistics correct as of 14 November 2026.

The 2026–27 season is Chelsea Women's 35th competitive season and 17th consecutive season in the Women's Super League, the top flight of English women's football.

Due to changes in the competition's format and the club's participation in the UEFA Champions League, Chelsea will not participate in the League Cup for the first time since 2011.

On 22 April 2026, it was announced that Chelsea would play all of their home WSL matches at Stamford Bridge from this season onwards. Two months later, on 9 June, it was further announced that all domestic cup and pre-knockout Champions League home matches would be played at AFC Wimbledon's Plough Lane stadium, bringing to an end the team's 9-year stay at Kingsmeadow.

== Squad information ==
=== First team squad ===
As of 20 October 2026

No.	Name	Nat	Since	Date of birth (age)	Signed from
Goalkeepers
1	Livia Peng	(Switzerland)	2025	14 March 2002 (age 24)	(Germany) Werder Bremen
24	Hannah Hampton	(England)	2023	16 November 2000 (age 26)	(England) Aston Villa
38	Becky Spencer	(Jamaica)	2025	22 February 1991 (age 35)	(England) Tottenham Hotspur
Defenders
2	Ellie Carpenter	(Australia)	2025	28 April 2000 (age 26)	(France) Lyon
4	Naomi Girma	(United States)	2025	14 June 2000 (age 26)	(United States) San Diego Wave FC
5	Veerle Buurman	(Netherlands)	2024	21 April 2006 (age 20)	(Netherlands) PSV
14	Nathalie Björn	(Sweden)	2024	4 May 1997 (age 29)	(England) Everton
15	Katie McCabe	(Republic of Ireland)	2026	21 September 1995 (age 31)	(England) Arsenal
17	Nelly Las	(England)	2026	17 December 2007 (age 18)	(England) Leicester City
22	Lucy Bronze	(England)	2024	28 October 1991 (age 35)	(Spain) Barcelona
26	Kadeisha Buchanan	(Canada)	2022	5 November 1995 (age 31)	(France) Lyon
42	Chloe Sarwie	(England)	2025	19 December 2008 (age 17)	Homegrown
Midfielders
6	Sjoeke Nüsken	(Germany)	2023	22 January 2001 (age 25)	(Germany) Eintracht Frankfurt
8	Erin Cuthbert (captain)	(Scotland)	2016	19 July 1998 (age 28)	(Scotland) Glasgow City
16	Giulia Dragoni	(Italy)	2026	7 November 2006 (age 20)	(Spain) Barcelona
19	Wieke Kaptein	(Netherlands)	2023	29 August 2005 (age 21)	(Netherlands) Twente
21	Keira Walsh	(England)	2025	8 April 1997 (age 29)	(Spain) Barcelona
25	Lola Brown	(England)	2024	31 October 2007 (age 19)	Homegrown
29	Manaka Matsukubo	(Japan)	2026	28 July 2004 (age 22)	(United States) North Carolina Courage
32	Lexi Potter	(England)	2023	17 August 2006 (age 20)	Homegrown
Forwards
7	Mayra Ramírez	(Colombia)	2024	23 March 1999 (age 27)	(Spain) Levante
9	Melvine Malard	(France)	2026	28 June 2000 (age 26)	(England) Manchester United
10	Lauren James	(England)	2021	29 September 2001 (age 25)	(England) Manchester United
11	Sandy Baltimore	(France)	2024	19 February 2000 (age 26)	(France) Paris Saint-Germain
12	Alyssa Thompson	(United States)	2025	7 November 2004 (age 22)	(United States) Angel City FC
23	Maika Hamano	(Japan)	2023	19 May 2004 (age 22)	(Japan) INAC Kobe Leonessa
31	Rachael Adedini	(France)	2026	20 June 2009 (age 17)	(England) Manchester City Academy
33	Aggie Beever-Jones	(England)	2021	27 July 2003 (age 23)	Homegrown

=== New contracts ===
No.	Pos	Player/Manager	Date	Contract end	Source
11	FW	(France) Sandy Baltimore	26 May 2026	2030	
22	DF	(England) Lucy Bronze	2 July 2026	2027	
33	FW	(England) Aggie Beever-Jones	6 July 2026	2030	
—	FW	(England) Lois Shooter	22 July 2026	2028	
24	GK	(England) Hannah Hampton	28 July 2026	2028	
—	FW	(England) Eva Hendle	31 July 2026	2028	
34	MF	(England) Vera Jones	14 August 2026	2029	
40	GK	(England) Katie Cox	19 August 2026	2029	
25	MF	(England) Lola Brown	24 August 2026	2029	

== Transfers and loans ==
=== In ===
Pos	Player	Transferred From	Fee	Date	Source
DF	(Republic of Ireland) Katie McCabe	(England) Arsenal	Free	1 June 2026	
MF	(Japan) Manaka Matsukubo	(United States) North Carolina Courage	Undisclosed	3 July 2026	
FW	(France) Melvine Malard	(England) Manchester United	Undisclosed	20 July 2026	
DF	(England) Nelly Las	(England) Leicester City	Undisclosed	24 July 2026	
MF	(Italy) Giulia Dragoni	(Spain) Barcelona	Undisclosed	31 July 2026	
FW	(France) Rachael Adedini	(England) Manchester City Academy	Undisclosed	20 October 2026	

=== Out ===
Pos	Player	Transferred To	Fee	Date	Source
FW	(Australia) Sam Kerr	(United States) Gotham FC	Free	16 May 2026	
MF	(Norway) Guro Reiten	(United States) Gotham FC	Free	30 June 2026	
MF	(Sweden) Johanna Rytting Kaneryd	(France) Lyon	Undisclosed	6 July 2026	
DF	(England) Niamh Charles	(England) Manchester City	Undisclosed	10 July 2026	
MF	(Spain) Júlia Bartel	(Italy) Juventus	Undisclosed	11 July 2026	
DF	(England) Brooke Aspin	(England) Bristol City	Undisclosed	16 July 2026	
DF	(England) Jorja Fox	(England) Ipswich Town	Undisclosed	28 August 2026	

=== Loan out ===
Pos	Player	To	Date	Until	Source
FW	(France) Louna Ribadeira	(France) Fleury	13 July 2026	End of season	
GK	(Netherlands) Femke Liefting	(Netherlands) Ajax	17 July 2026	End of season	
FW	(England) Lois Shooter	(England) Nottingham Forest	22 July 2026	End of season	
FW	(England) Eva Hendle	(Scotland) Rangers	31 July 2026	End of season	
FW	(Germany) Mara Alber	(Germany) VfL Wolfsburg	14 August 2026	End of season	
GK	(England) Katie Cox	(England) Nottingham Forest	19 August 2026	End of season	
MF	(England) Vera Jones	(England) Watford	20 August 2026	End of season	

== Management team ==
Position	Staff
Manager	(France) Sonia Bompastor
Assistant coach	(France) Camille Abily
Assistant coach	(France) Theo Rivrin
Assistant coach	(England) Tanya Tate
Coach	(England) Gemma Davison
Goalkeeping coach	(England) Seb Brown
Assistant goalkeeping coach	(England) Dan Smith
Movement coach	(England) Harry McCulloch
Match analyst	(England) Jamie Cook
Opposition analyst	(England) Jack Stephens
Scouting co-ordinator and academy coach	(England) TJ O'Leary

Source: Chelsea F.C.

== Pre-season and friendlies ==
8 August 2026 Friendly	Auckland FC Invitational XI (New Zealand)	0–7	(England) Chelsea	Auckland, New Zealand
16:00 NZST		Report	Beever-Jones 10', 13', 23'; Baltimore 26'; Dragoni 55'; Hamano 65'; Ramírez 85'	Stadium: Eden Park; Referee: Sarah Jones

12 August 2026 Friendly	A-Leagues All Stars Women (Australia) (New Zealand)	0–3	(England) Chelsea	Sydney, New South Wales, Australia
19:45 AEST		Report	Baltimore 9'; Nüsken 12'; Potter 70'	Stadium: Allianz Stadium; Referee: Isabella Mossin

== Competitions ==
=== Women's Super League ===
==== League table ====
Pos	Team	Pld	W	D	L	GF	GA	GD	Pts	Qualification or relegation
1	Chelsea	11	8	3	0	29	5	+24	27	Qualification for the Champions League league phase
2	Manchester City	11	8	1	2	28	14	+14	25	Qualification for the Champions League league phase
3	London City Lionesses	11	7	2	2	31	14	+17	23	Qualification for the Champions League third qualifying round
4	Manchester United	11	6	3	2	14	12	+2	21	
5	Tottenham Hotspur	11	6	2	3	28	19	+9	20	

Updated to match(es) played on 22 November 2026. Source: Women's Super League Table
Rules for classification: 1) Points; 2) Goal difference; 3) Number of goals scored.

==== Results summary ====
Overall								Home						Away					
Pld	W	D	L	GF	GA	GD	Pts	W	D	L	GF	GA	GD	W	D	L	GF	GA	GD
11	8	3	0	29	5	+24	27	4	2	0	12	4	+8	4	1	0	17	1	+16

Last updated: 21 November 2026.
Source: FA WSL

==== Results by matchday ====
Matchday	1	2	3	4	5	6	7	8	9	10	11	12	13	14	15	16	17	18	19	20	21	22	23	24	25	26
Result	D	W	W	W	W	W	W	W	D	W	D															
Position	8	2	3	3	2	2	1	1	2	1	1															

Updated to match(es) played on 21 November 2026. Source: FA WSL
W = Win; D = Draw; L = Loss

==== Matches ====
5 September 2026 1	Chelsea	1–1	Aston Villa	Fulham
12:30 BST	James 11'	Report	Taylor (yellow card) 71'; Buurman 79' (o.g.); Kielland (yellow card) 90+4'	Stadium: Stamford Bridge; Attendance: 7,900; Referee: William Davis

13 September 2026 2	Manchester United	0–5	Chelsea	Leigh
12:00 BST	Bernal (yellow card) 84'	Report	Nüsken 21'; Walsh 32'; James 61'; Carpenter 66'; Buchanan (yellow card) 90+4'; Bronze 90+5'	Stadium: Leigh Sports Village; Attendance: 4,327; Referee: Grace Lowe

19 September 2026 3	Chelsea	2–0	Birmingham City	Fulham
12:45 BST	Potter 8'; Malard 71'; Walsh (yellow card) 90+1'	Report		Stadium: Stamford Bridge; Attendance: 4,793; Referee: Alice Parker

27 September 2026 4	Chelsea	1–0	Arsenal	Fulham
16:30 BST	Thompson 39'; McCabe (yellow card) 45'; Bronze (yellow card) 45+3'	Report		Stadium: Stamford Bridge; Attendance: 19,349; Referee: Emily Heaslip

4 October 2026 5	West Ham United	0–3	Chelsea	Dagenham
14:00 BST		Report	Kaptein (yellow card) 32'; Malard 38'; Walsh 80'; Hamano 87'	Stadium: Victoria Road; Referee: Sophie Dennington

18 October 2026 6	Chelsea	6–2	Tottenham Hotspur	Fulham
14:00 GMT	James 25', 62'; Carpenter 58', 90+1'; Nüsken 67'; Cuthbert (yellow card) 82'; Hamano 86'	Report	A. Nildén (yellow card) 18'; Vinberg 41'; Pelova (yellow card) 55'; Gaupset 87'; Koga (yellow card) 90+5'	Stadium: Stamford Bridge; Attendance: 7,814; Referee: Kirsty Dowle

25 October 2026 7	Crystal Palace	1–3	Chelsea	Sutton
12:00 GMT	Bartrip 20'; Blanchard (yellow card) 44'; Ladd (yellow card) 70'	Report	Kaptein (yellow card) 44'; McCabe (yellow card) 44'; Malard 51', 75'; Bronze (yellow card) 63'; Baltimore 90' (pen.)	Stadium: Gander Green Lane; Referee: Alice Parker

1 November 2026 8	Charlton Athletic	0–6	Chelsea	Charlton
14:30 GMT	Hutton (yellow card) 50'	Report	Björn 3'; Malard 10', 19'; Carpenter 13'; Beever-Jones 57'; Dragoni 66'	Stadium: The Valley; Attendance: 3,027; Referee: Melissa Burgin

7 November 2026 9	Chelsea	1–1	Everton	Fulham
12:45 GMT	Baltimore 28'	Report	Bronze 33' (o.g.); Blundell (yellow card) 88'; Mace (yellow card) 90'	Stadium: Stamford Bridge; Attendance: 5,651; Referee: Lisa Benn

14 November 2026 10	Chelsea	1–0	Manchester City	Fulham
13:30 GMT	Potter (yellow card) 14'; Baltimore 45+4'	Report	Shaw (yellow card) 47'; Wamser (yellow card) 53'; Yamashita (red card) 75'	Stadium: Stamford Bridge; Attendance: 11,169; Referee: Phoebe Cross

21 November 2026 11	Liverpool	0–0	Chelsea	St Helens
12:45 GMT		Report		Stadium: BrewDog Stadium; Referee: Ben Speedie

13 December 2026 12	Chelsea	v	London City Lionesses	Fulham
14:00 GMT				Stadium: Stamford Bridge

19 December 2026 13	Brighton & Hove Albion	v	Chelsea	Crawley
12:30 GMT				Stadium: Broadfield Stadium

10 January 2027 14	Manchester City	v	Chelsea	Manchester
14:00 GMT				Stadium: Academy Stadium

20 January 2027 15	Chelsea	v	Charlton Athletic	Fulham
19:00 GMT				Stadium: Stamford Bridge

24 January 2027 16	Chelsea	v	Crystal Palace	Fulham
14:00 GMT				Stadium: Stamford Bridge

31 January 2027 17	Tottenham Hotspur	v	Chelsea	Leyton
14:00 GMT				Stadium: Brisbane Road

7 February 2027 18	Chelsea	v	Liverpool	Fulham
14:00 GMT				Stadium: Stamford Bridge

14 February 2027 19	London City Lionesses	v	Chelsea	Bromley
14:00 GMT				Stadium: Hayes Lane

13 March 2027 20	Birmingham City	v	Chelsea	Bordesley
				Stadium: St Andrew's

17 March 2027 21	Chelsea	v	West Ham United	Fulham
19:00 GMT				Stadium: Stamford Bridge

28 March 2027 22	Arsenal	v	Chelsea	Holloway
14:00 GMT				Stadium: Emirates Stadium

4 April 2027 23	Chelsea	v	Manchester United	Fulham
14:00 BST				Stadium: Stamford Bridge

2 May 2027 24	Aston Villa	v	Chelsea	Aston
18:00 BST				Stadium: Villa Park

9 May 2027 25	Chelsea	v	Brighton & Hove Albion	Fulham
14:00 BST				Stadium: Stamford Bridge

21–23 May 2027 26	Everton	v	Chelsea	Liverpool
				Stadium: Goodison Park

=== UEFA Women's Champions League ===
==== Third qualifying round ====
26 August 2026 First leg	Chelsea (England)	5–2	(Spain) Real Sociedad	Wimbledon
18:45 BST	Nüsken (yellow card) 24'; Girma 29'; Buurman 54'; Malard 67', 88'; James 74'	Report	Marín 7'; Marcos 58'; Laborde (yellow card) 83'	Stadium: Plough Lane; Attendance: 1,588; Referee: Silvia Gasperotti (Italy)

2 September 2026 Second leg	Real Sociedad (Spain)	0–1 (2–6 agg.)	(England) Chelsea	San Sebastián
19:00 CEST	Camino (yellow card) 38'; Cahynová (yellow card) 60'; Florentino (yellow card) 67'	Report	Walsh 54'	Stadium: Estadio Zubieta; Attendance: 1,750; Referee: Ivana Martinčić (Croatia)

==== League phase ====
Pos	Team	Pld	W	D	L	GF	GA	GD	Pts	Qualification
2	(French Football Federation) OL Lyonnes (Q)	5	4	1	0	22	0	+22	13	Advance to the quarter-finals (seeded)
3	(German Football Association) Bayern Munich (T)	5	3	2	0	13	5	+8	11	Advance to the quarter-finals (seeded)
4	(The Football Association) Chelsea (T)	5	3	2	0	4	0	+4	11	Advance to the quarter-finals (seeded)
5	(The Football Association) Manchester City (T)	5	2	3	0	10	5	+5	9 (Note: Ranked based on away goals scored, Manchester City 8, Real Madrid 3)	Advance to the knockout phase play-offs (seeded)
6	(Royal Spanish Football Federation) Real Madrid (T)	5	2	3	0	10	5	+5	9	Advance to the knockout phase play-offs (seeded)

Updated to match(es) played on 19 November 2026. Source: UEFA
Rules for classification: League phase tiebreakers
(Q) Qualified for the phase indicated; (T) Qualified, but not yet for the particular phase indicated
Notes:

23 September 2026 1	Chelsea (England)	1–0	Austria Wien	Wimbledon
20:00 BST	Kaptein 11'; McCabe (yellow card) 51'	Report	Šišić (yellow card) 89'	Stadium: Plough Lane; Attendance: 846; Referee: Miriama Bocková (Slovakia)

30 September 2026 2	(France) OL Lyonnes	0–0	(England) Chelsea	Décines-Charpieu
21:00 CEST	Brand (yellow card) 50'; Tarciane (yellow card) 54'	Report	Potter (yellow card) 27'	Stadium: Parc Olympique Lyonnais; Attendance: 7,324; Referee: Marta Huerta de Aza (Spain)

28 October 2026 3	Chelsea (England)	2–0	(Italy) Roma	Wimbledon
17:45 GMT	Carpenter 51'; Buchanan 89'	Report		Stadium: Plough Lane; Attendance: 2,510; Referee: Olatz Rivera Olmedo (Spain)

10 November 2026 4	(Sweden) BK Häcken	0–0	(England) Chelsea	Gothenburg
18:45 CET	Omewa (yellow card) 90+2'	Report	Potter (yellow card) 52'	Stadium: Nordic Wellness Arena; Attendance: 4,614; Referee: Fabienne Michel (Germany)

18 November 2026 5	Chelsea (England)	1–0	(France) Paris Saint-Germain	Wimbledon
20:00 GMT	Buurman 87'; Bronze (yellow card) 89'	Report		Stadium: Plough Lane; Attendance: 2,806; Referee: Maria Sole Ferrieri Caputi (Italy)

16 December 2026 6	(Belgium) OH Leuven	v	(England) Chelsea	Leuven
21:00 CET		Report		Stadium: Den Dreef

== Statistics ==
=== Appearances and goals ===
As of 21 November 2026

No.	Pos	Nat	Player	Total		WSL		FA Cup		Champions League	
No.	Pos	Nat	Player	Apps	Goals	Apps	Goals	Apps	Goals	Apps	Goals
Goalkeepers:
1	GK	(Switzerland) SUI	Livia Peng	2	0	0	0	0	0	2	0
24	GK	(England) ENG	Hannah Hampton	16	0	11	0	0	0	5	0
38	GK	(Jamaica) JAM	Becky Spencer	0	0	0	0	0	0	0	0
Defenders:
2	DF	(Australia) AUS	Ellie Carpenter	18	5	11	4	0	0	6+1	1
4	DF	(United States) USA	Naomi Girma	2	1	0	0	0	0	2	1
5	DF	(Netherlands) NED	Veerle Buurman	14	2	5+3	0	0	0	6	2
14	DF	(Sweden) SWE	Nathalie Björn	7	1	1+4	1	0	0	2	0
15	DF	(Republic of Ireland) IRL	Katie McCabe	14	0	9+2	0	0	0	3	0
17	DF	(England) ENG	Nelly Las	2	0	0+1	0	0	0	0+1	0
22	DF	(England) ENG	Lucy Bronze	16	1	10	1	0	0	4+2	0
26	DF	(Canada) CAN	Kadeisha Buchanan	13	1	8	0	0	0	4+1	1
42	DF	(England) ENG	Chloe Sarwie	1	0	0	0	0	0	0+1	0
Midfielders:
6	MF	(Germany) GER	Sjoeke Nüsken	16	2	7+3	2	0	0	4+2	0
8	MF	(Scotland) SCO	Erin Cuthbert	9	0	1+5	0	0	0	1+2	0
16	MF	(Italy) ITA	Giulia Dragoni	8	1	0+6	1	0	0	0+2	0
19	MF	(Netherlands) NED	Wieke Kaptein	17	1	10	0	0	0	6+1	1
21	MF	(England) ENG	Keira Walsh	17	3	10	2	0	0	6+1	1
25	MF	(England) ENG	Lola Brown	1	0	0+1	0	0	0	0	0
29	MF	(Japan) JPN	Manaka Matsukubo	4	0	2+1	0	0	0	0+1	0
32	MF	(England) ENG	Lexi Potter	15	1	7+2	1	0	0	5+1	0
Forwards:
7	FW	(Colombia) COL	Mayra Ramírez	0	0	0	0	0	0	0	0
9	FW	(France) FRA	Melvine Malard	13	8	7+1	6	0	0	3+2	2
10	FW	(England) ENG	Lauren James	9	5	5	4	0	0	3+1	1
11	FW	(France) FRA	Sandy Baltimore	16	3	6+4	3	0	0	5+1	0
12	FW	(United States) USA	Alyssa Thompson	18	1	8+3	1	0	0	6+1	0
23	FW	(Japan) JPN	Maika Hamano	13	2	2+5	2	0	0	0+6	0
31	FW	(France) FRA	Rachael Adedini	0	0	0	0	0	0	0	0
33	FW	(England) ENG	Aggie Beever-Jones	13	1	1+8	1	0	0	4	0

- Source: Chelsea F.C.

=== Goalscorers ===
Includes all competitive matches. The list is sorted by squad number when total goals are equal.

As of 21 November 2026

Rank	Pos.	No.	Player	FA WSL	FA Cup	Champions League	Total
1	FW	9	(France) Melvine Malard	6	0	2	8
2	DF	2	(Australia) Ellie Carpenter	4	0	1	5
2	FW	10	(England) Lauren James	4	0	1	5
4	FW	11	(France) Sandy Baltimore	3	0	0	3
4	MF	21	(England) Keira Walsh	2	0	1	3
6	DF	5	(Netherlands) Veerle Buurman	0	0	2	2
6	MF	6	(Germany) Sjoeke Nüsken	2	0	0	2
6	MF	23	(Japan) Maika Hamano	2	0	0	2
8	DF	4	(United States) Naomi Girma	0	0	1	1
8	FW	12	(United States) Alyssa Thompson	1	0	0	1
8	DF	14	(Sweden) Nathalie Björn	1	0	0	1
8	MF	16	(Italy) Giulia Dragoni	1	0	0	1
8	MF	19	(Netherlands) Wieke Kaptein	0	0	1	1
8	DF	22	(England) Lucy Bronze	1	0	0	1
8	DF	26	(Canada) Kadeisha Buchanan	0	0	1	1
8	MF	32	(England) Lexi Potter	1	0	0	1
8	FW	33	(England) Aggie Beever-Jones	1	0	0	1
Total				29	0	10	39

=== Clean sheets ===
Includes all competitive matches. The list is sorted by squad number when total clean sheets are equal.

As of 21 November 2026

Rank	Pos.	No.	Player	FA WSL	FA Cup	Champions League	Total
1	GK	24	(England) Hannah Hampton	7	0	4	11
2	GK	1	(Switzerland) Livia Peng	0	0	2	2
Total				7	0	6	13

=== Disciplinary records ===
Includes all competitive matches. The list is sorted by squad number when total cards are equal.

As of 21 November 2026

Rank	Pos.	No.	Name	FA WSL			FA Cup			Champions League			Total		
Rank	Pos.	No.	Name	Yellow card	(yellow card) (yellow-red card)	Red card	Yellow card	(yellow card) (yellow-red card)	Red card	Yellow card	(yellow card) (yellow-red card)	Red card	Yellow card	(yellow card) (yellow-red card)	Red card
1	DF	15	(Republic of Ireland) Katie McCabe	2	0	0	0	0	0	1	0	0	3	0	0
1	DF	22	(England) Lucy Bronze	2	0	0	0	0	0	1	0	0	3	0	0
1	MF	32	(England) Lexi Potter	1	0	0	0	0	0	2	0	0	3	0	0
3	MF	19	(Netherlands) Wieke Kaptein	2	0	0	0	0	0	0	0	0	2	0	0
5	MF	6	(Germany) Sjoeke Nüsken	0	0	0	0	0	0	1	0	0	1	0	0
5	MF	8	(Scotland) Erin Cuthbert	1	0	0	0	0	0	0	0	0	1	0	0
5	MF	21	(England) Keira Walsh	1	0	0	0	0	0	0	0	0	1	0	0
5	DF	26	(Canada) Kadeisha Buchanan	1	0	0	0	0	0	0	0	0	1	0	0
Total				10	0	0	0	0	0	5	0	0	15	0	0
