= Chloe Sarwie =

English footballer (born 2008)

Personal information
- Full name: Chloe Sarwie
- Date of birth: 19 December 2008 (age 17)
- Place of birth: Lambeth, England
- Height: 5 ft 8 in (1.73 m)
- Position: Defender

Team information
- Current team: Chelsea
- Number: 42

Youth career
- 2018–2025: Chelsea

Senior career*
Years	Team	Apps	(Gls)
2025–	Chelsea	5	(0)

International career^{‡}
2024–2025	England U17	6	(1)
2025	England U19	3	(0)
2025–	England U23	6	(0)
2026–	England U20	3	(0)
- * Club domestic league appearances and goals as of 19:16, 17 May 2026 (UTC) ‡ National team caps and goals as of 19:52, 10 July 2026 (UTC)

Chloe Sarwie (born 19 December 2008) is an English professional footballer who plays as a defender for Women's Super League club Chelsea and the England under-20 and under-23 national teams.

== Early life ==
Chloe Sarwie was born on 19 December 2008 in Lambeth, South London, and raised in Clapham. She has an older brother. As a child, she "wasn't really interested" in football, instead taking part in ballet between the ages of two and eight. Sarwie has stated that ballet has contributed to her technical footballing skills, making her light on her feet, and that she uses breathing exercises learnt to cope with nerves ahead of ballet performances ahead of football matches.

== Youth career ==
Sarwie joined Chelsea's academy when she was eight or nine years old. She was encouraged to join an academy after a coach spotted her playing football in a park. During her youth career, Sarwie played as both an attacking midfielder and a winger before solidifying her full-back role.

In October 2024, Sarwie participated in the East Mallorca Girls Cup, an international youth football tournament held in Mallorca, Spain.

== Club career ==
=== Chelsea, 2025– ===
On 8 October 2025, Sarwie, age 16, made her first team debut for Chelsea, coming on as a substitute in a 1–1 draw with FC Twente. On 24 February 2026, she signed her first professional contract with the club, following in the footsteps of fellow academy graduates Aggie Beever-Jones and Lola Brown. Sarwie was an unused substitute as Chelsea won the 2025–26 Women's League Cup. Sarwie made seven appearances for Chelsea across all competition in the 2025–26 season.

On 28 May 2026, Sarwie was named to Chelsea's squad for the World Sevens (an invitational seven-a-side tournament). Chelsea won the tournament, beating Manchester United 6–5 in the final. In August 2026, Sarwie was part of the Chelsea squad who travelled to New Zealand and Australia for a pre-season tour. She appeared as a second-half substitute in the team's 0–7 victory over Auckland FC and 0–3 win over an A-League All-Stars side.

== International career ==
Sarwie has played for England at all youth levels.

In July 2025, Sarwie was part of the England under-19 team who competed at the 2025 Under-19 Euro; she was the youngest member of the squad.

On 19 November 2025, Sarwie was named to England under-20's 24-player squad for a series of friendlies ahead of the 2026 U-20 Women’s World Cup. On 24 November 2025, Sarwie—age 16—was called up to England's under-23 team after Megan Collett withdrew due to injury, and was replaced in the under-20 squad by Damilola Atinaro. In April 2026, Sarwie was part of the winning squad at the U23 European Competition, having been awarded Player of the Match in the semi-final victory over the Netherlands. In May and July 2026, Sarwie was called back up to the under-20 squad for U-20 World Cup preparation camps in Spain and the United States. On 21 August 2026, Sarwie was officially called up to represent England at the tournament.

== Personal life ==
Sarwie's mother, Jean, teaches at the school that Sarwie attends. As of 2026, she is studying for a BTEC qualification in Engineering. Her family are Arsenal supporters.

Sarwie has stated that—despite not initially picking it herself—42, her shirt number for Chelsea, has become her lucky number.

== Career statistics ==
=== Club ===
As of match played 2 September 2026

Appearances and goals by club, season and competition
Club	Season	League			Cup (Note: Includes the Women's FA Cup)		League Cup (Note: Includes the WSL Players Cup, formerly known as the Women's League Cup)		Europe		Total	
Club	Season	Division	Apps	Goals	Apps	Goals	Apps	Goals	Apps	Goals	Apps	Goals
Chelsea	2025–26	WSL	5	0	1	0	0	0	1	0	7	0
Chelsea	2026–27	WSL	0	0	0	0	—		1	0	1	0
Total			5	0	1	0	0	0	2	0	8	0

== Honours ==
Chelsea

- Women's League Cup: 2025–26

England U23

- European U23 Competition winner: 2025–26
