= Veerle Buurman =

Dutch footballer (born 2006)

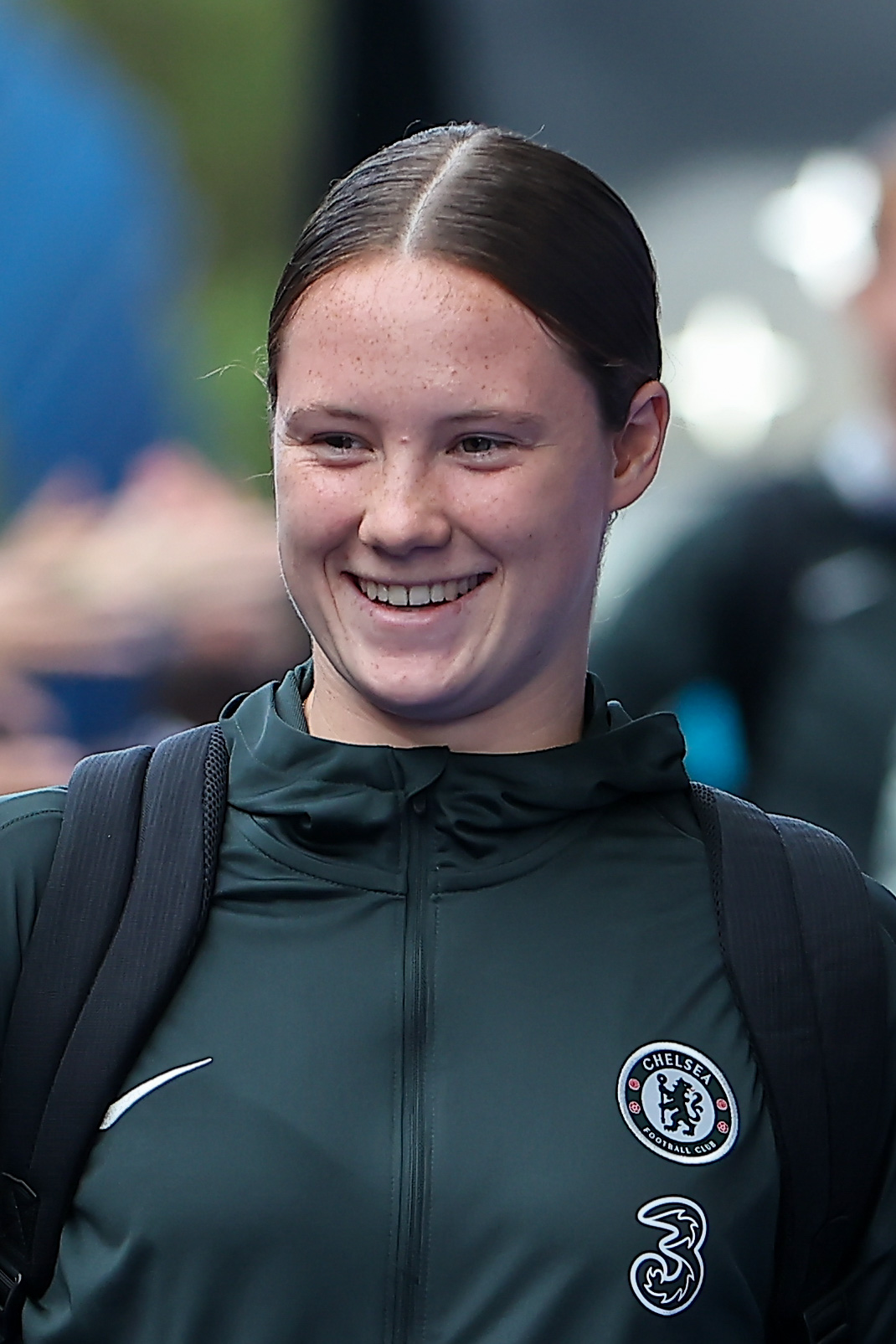
- Buurman in 2025

Personal information
- Full name: Veerle Tooske Janna Roos Buurman
- Date of birth: 21 April 2006 (age 20)
- Place of birth: Bemmel, Netherlands
- Position: Defender

Team information
- Current team: Chelsea
- Number: 5

Youth career
- Sportclub Bemmel
- 2023–2024: PSV

Senior career*
Years	Team	Apps	(Gls)
2024	PSV	11	(0)
2024–	Chelsea	21	(2)
2024–2025	→ PSV (loan)	21	(1)

International career^{‡}
2021–2022	Netherlands U16	7	(3)
2022–2023	Netherlands U17	13	(0)
2023–2024	Netherlands U19	14	(1)
2024	Netherlands U20	9	(2)
2024–	Netherlands	20	(2)
- * Club domestic league appearances and goals as of 15:10, 21 November 2026 (UTC) ‡ National team caps and goals as of 13 October 2026

Veerle Tooske Janna Roos Buurman (Dutch: [ˈveːr.lə ˈtoːskə ˈjɑna roːs ˈbyrˌmɑn]; born 21 April 2006) is a Dutch professional footballer who plays as a defender for Women's Super League club Chelsea and the Netherlands national team. She previously played for PSV Eindhoven in the Vrouwen Eredivisie.

== Early life ==
Veerle Tooske Janna Roos Buurman was born on 21 April 2006 in Bemmel, the Netherlands. She has an older brother and younger brother who both play football. Buurman began playing football at the age of five.

== Youth career ==
Buurman played football with the boys team at her local club Sportclub Bemmel up to under-17 level.

In 2023, Buurman joined the youth academy of Dutch side Philips Sport Vereniging Vrouwen (commonly known as PSV Eindhoven). Around six months after joining PSV's academy, she began progressing into the senior side.

== Club career ==
=== PSV, 2024 ===
On 21 January 2024, Buurman made her club debut for PSV at the age of seventeen.

=== Chelsea, 2024– ===
On 13 September 2024, Buurman was signed by Women's Super League club Chelsea. Her signing earned a record fee for PSV.

==== Loan to PSV, 2024–25 ====
Immediately after signing for Chelsea, it was announced that Buurman would return to PSV on loan for the 2024–25 season. She started 21 of PSV's 22 league matches. At the end of the season, Buurman was named Eredivisie Talent of the Year.

==== Return to Chelsea, 2025– ====
===== 2025–26 =====
Buurman made her debut for Chelsea in September 2025 during a 1–0 win against Leicester City. In March 2026, Buurman's Champions League quarter-final equaliser against Arsenal was controversially ruled out by VAR, with manager Sonia Bompastor describing the standard of refereeing as ‘‘not good enough.’’ Buurman scored her first goal for the club in April 2026 in the form of a late winner against Tottenham to send Chelsea into the FA Cup semi-finals. The goal was named Chelsea's Goal of the Month for April. Described as an ‘‘absolute rock at the back’’ by Chelsea and England goalkeeper Hannah Hampton, Buurman's performance across the season—in which she was called into the starting lineup as both a left back and centre back due to injuries throughout the squad—led her to be named Barclay's WSL Rising Star. She was shortlisted for PFA Women’s Young Player of the Year at the 2026 PFA Awards alongside Chelsea teammate Alyssa Thompson.

== International career ==
Buurman played for the Netherlands national under-20 team at the 2024 FIFA U-20 Women's World Cup.

On 29 October 2024, she made her debut for the senior Netherlands national team in a 2–1 friendly win over Denmark. Buurman's first senior goal came in December 2024 against the United States; she scored an own goal in the same half.

Buurman was called up for the UEFA Women's Euro 2025 in Switzerland. She made two appearances at the tournament — the Netherlands were knocked out at the group stage.

== Personal life ==
Buurman has described fellow Dutch center-back Virgil van Dijk as her idol.

== Career statistics ==
=== Club ===
As of match played 21 November 2026

Appearances and goals by club, season and competition
Club	Season	League			Cup (Note: Includes the KNVB Women's Cup and Women's FA Cup)		League Cup (Note: Includes the Eredivisie Cup and the WSL Players Cup, formerly known as the Women's League Cup)		Europe		Total	
Club	Season	Division	Apps	Goals	Apps	Goals	Apps	Goals	Apps	Goals	Apps	Goals
PSV	2023–24	Vrouwen Eredivisie	11	0	—		2	1	—		13	1
PSV (loan)	2024–25	Vrouwen Eredivisie	21	1	4	0	2	1	—		27	2
PSV (loan)	Total		32	1	4	0	4	2	0	0	40	3
Chelsea	2025–26	WSL	13	0	4	1	2	0	5	0	24	1
Chelsea	2026–27	WSL	8	0	0	0	—		6	2	14	2
Chelsea	Total		21	0	4	1	2	0	11	2	38	3
Career total			53	1	8	1	6	2	11	2	78	6

=== International ===
As of match played 9 June 2026

Scores and results list England's goal tally first, score column indicates score after each Buurman goal.

List of international goals scored by Veerle Buurman
No.	Date	Venue	Opponent	Score	Result	Competition
1.	3 December 2024	ADO Den Haag Stadium, The Hague, Netherlands	United States	1–0	1–2	Friendly
2.	3 March 2026	Gdańsk Stadium, Gdańsk, Poland	Poland	1–1	2–2	2027 FIFA Women's World Cup qualification

== Honours ==
Chelsea

- Women's League Cup: 2025–26

Individual

- Eredivisie Talent of the Year: 2024–25
- Barclays WSL Rising Star: 2025–26
