= Lexi Potter =

English footballer (born 2006)

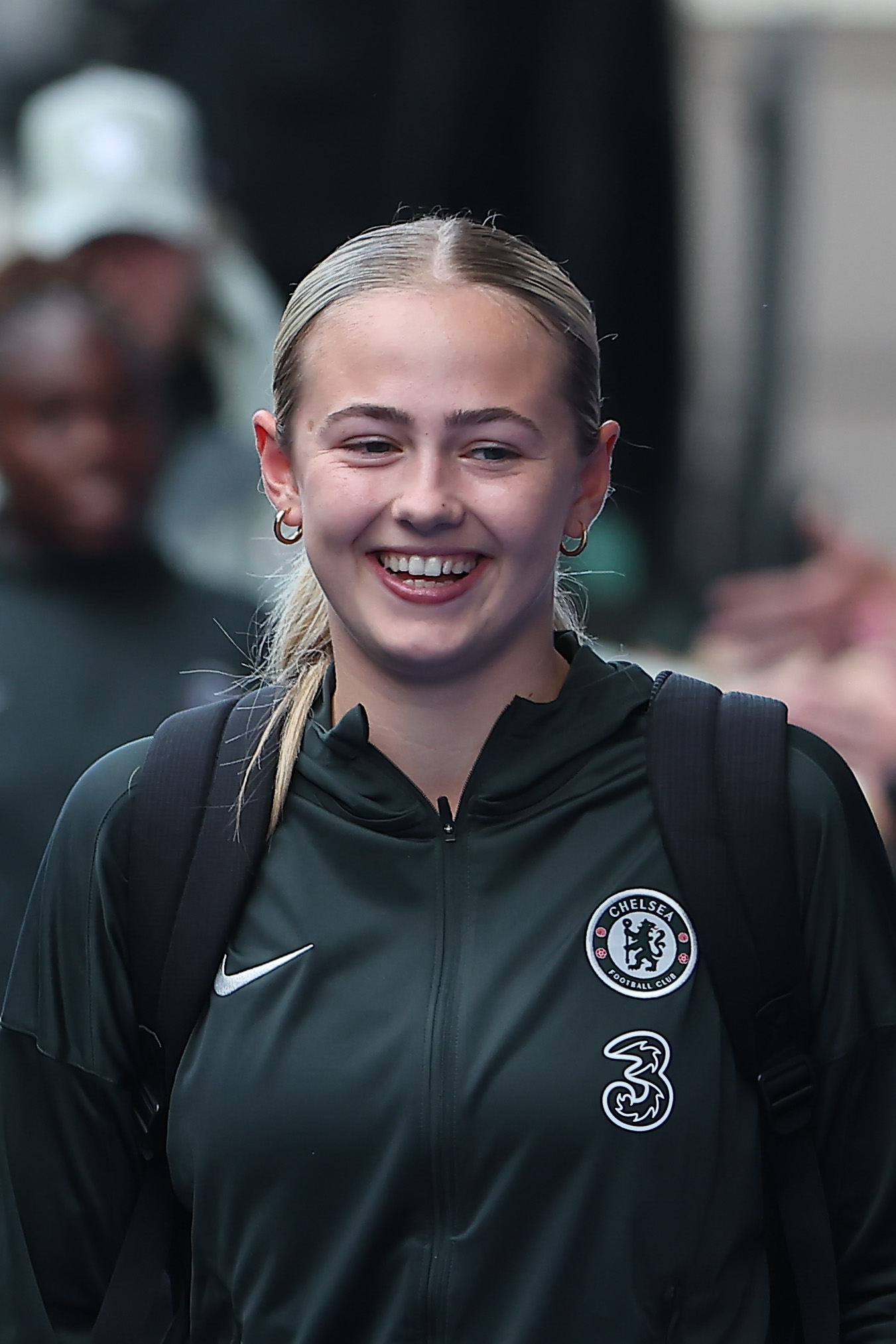
- Potter in 2025

Personal information
- Full name: Alexia Potter
- Date of birth: 17 August 2006 (age 20)
- Place of birth: Epsom, England
- Height: 5 ft 8 in (1.73 m)
- Position: Midfielder

Team information
- Current team: Chelsea
- Number: 32

Youth career
- Chelsea

Senior career*
Years	Team	Apps	(Gls)
2023–	Chelsea	17	(2)
2023–2025	→ Crystal Palace (loan)	35	(1)

International career^{‡}
2021–2023	England U17	13	(6)
2023–2025	England U19	21	(6)
2025–	England U23	3	(0)
2026–	England	1	(0)
- * Club domestic league appearances and goals as of 16:15, 21 November 2026 (UTC) ‡ National team caps and goals as of 10:08, 14 October 2026 (UTC)

Alexia "Lexi" Potter (born 17 August 2006) is an English professional footballer who plays as a midfielder for Chelsea and the England national team. A product of the Chelsea academy, she previously captained the England under-17s.

== Early life ==
Alexia Potter was born on 17 August 2006 in Epsom, Surrey. From the age of three, she was raised in Redhill, close to Chelsea's Cobham Training Centre. Her father is from Essex, and her mother - a primary school teacher - is from Banstead, Surrey. She has an older brother.

Potter attended St Bede's School in Redhill where she played for the boy's football team. Alongside football, Potter also played futsal as a child.

== Youth career ==
Having played with her brother in a local boy's team, Potter joined Chelsea's academy at the age of eight. With Chelsea's U16 team, Potter won the Youth Cup and Academy Cup, having represented the club at WSL Academy League level.

== Club career ==
=== Chelsea, 2023– ===
On 3 September 2023, at the age of 17, Potter became the youngest female player in England to sign a professional football contract. A product of the Chelsea academy, her maid contract committed her to Chelsea until summer 2026.

==== Loan to Crystal Palace, 2023–25 ====
Having signed her first professional contract, Potter joined Women's Championship side Crystal Palace for the 2023–24 season. Having struggled to break into Palace's starting eleven for the first few weeks of her loan, Potter sought advice from head coach Laura Kaminski, asking Kaminski what she needed to do in order to play. Kaminski later reflected that she would "never forget" Potter's response to her feedback, which enabled her to progress towards her debut. On 12 November 2023, having come on as a 78th-minute substitute, Potter scored her debut professional goal for Crystal Palace in a 3–2 victory over Lewes. Palace were promote to the top-tier Women' Super League (WSL) at the end of the season; Kaminski described Potter's performances towards their promoton as "outstanding" and would later say that "if [Crystal Palace] did not have Lexi, we wouldn't have gotten promoted."

On 31 August 2024, Potter signed a new four-year contract with Chelsea and returned to Crystal Palace on loan for the 2024–25 season.

==== Return to Chelsea, 2025– ====
On 15 October 2025, having returned from her loan with Palace, Potter made her senior debut for Chelsea in a 4–0 Champions League victory over Paris FC. She made just four appearances for Chelsea in the opening months of the 2025–26 Women's Super League campaign. Despite "not playing as much as [she'd] like," Potter expressed her belief that training alongside Chelsea's "world-class players" was beneficial for her development. On 15 March 2026, Potter was a late substitute in Chelsea's 2025–26 Women's League Cup final victory over Manchester United. On 18 March 2026, Potter made her first start in the WSL, scoring her first goal for Chelsea—and the game winner— in a 2–1 win over Brighton. She was named Player of the Match.

Potter started for Chelsea in three of their four opening 2026–27 WSL games, scoring in the team's 2–0 victory over Birmingham. Her performances were praised by teammates and the media, with former England striker Ellen White describing Potter as a "special player." In particular, Potter was applauded for her partnership with Keira Walsh; Chelsea coach Sonia Bompastor said of the pair's playing relationship that "even when...they close their eyes, they know where each other are." Walsh, capped more than 100 times for England, stated that she believed Potter was "probably going to be better than me."

== International career ==
On 30 March 2022, with England under-17s, Potter scored her debut youth international goal within 8 minutes against Croatia, set up by Ava Baker, in an 8–0 win for U17 Championship qualification.

On 7 October 2022, for 2023 U17 Championship qualification, she captained the England U17 team, scoring two goals in an 11–0 win over Ukraine, followed by another two goals against Belgium on 15 March 2023, helping the team to qualify for the final tournament and reach the semi-finals.

On 26 September 2023, with the under-19s, Potter provided a goal in a 3–3 draw with Germany, as well as an assist to Poppy Pritchard. On 27 October 2023, for U19 Championship qualification, she scored the fourth goal in a 6–1 victory over Wales, followed by the final goal in a 2–0 against Switzerland, while playing in the number 10 role on 3 April 2024. On 14 July in the final tournament, Potter scored the ninth goal in England's 10–0 victory over Lithuania in the opening group stage match.

In September 2026, Potter received her first call-up to the England senior squad ahead of the 2027 FIFA World Cup qualifying play-off against Greece. On 13 October 2026, she made her debut, starting in England's 5–0 (8–1 on aggregate) victory over Greece at the King Power Stadium.

== Style of play ==
Potter has been described as a box-to-box midfielder. As of September 2026, she began to play in a deeper position for Chelsea, acting in a double pivot alongside Keira Walsh. Potter has been praised for her composure and passing accuracy.

Potter has described Andrés Iniesta as her favourite player.

== Career statistics ==
=== Club ===
As of match played 21 November 2026

Appearances and goals by club, season and competition
Club	Season	League			FA Cup		League Cup		Europe		Total	
Club	Season	Division	Apps	Goals	Apps	Goals	Apps	Goals	Apps	Goals	Apps	Goals
Chelsea	2023–24	WSL	0	0	0	0	0	0	0	0	0	0
Chelsea	2024–25	WSL	0	0	0	0	0	0	0	0	0	0
Chelsea	2025–26	WSL	8	1	1	0	2	0	3 (Note: Appearances in UEFA Women's Champions League)	0	14	1
Chelsea	2026–27	WSL	9	1	0	0	—		6	0	15	1
Chelsea	Total		17	2	1	0	2	0	9	0	29	2
Crystal Palace (loan)	2023–24	Women's Championship	16	1	2	0	3	0	—		21	1
Crystal Palace (loan)	2024–25	WSL	19	0	2	0	2	0	—		23	0
Crystal Palace (loan)	Total		35	1	4	0	5	0	—		44	1
Career total			52	3	5	0	7	0	9	0	73	3

=== International ===
As of match played 13 October 2026

Appearances and goals by national team and year
National team	Year	Apps	Goals
England	2026	1	0
Total		1	0

== Honours ==
Chelsea

- Women's League Cup: 2025–26

Crystal Palace Women

- Women's Championship: 2023–24
