= Sjoeke Nüsken =

German footballer

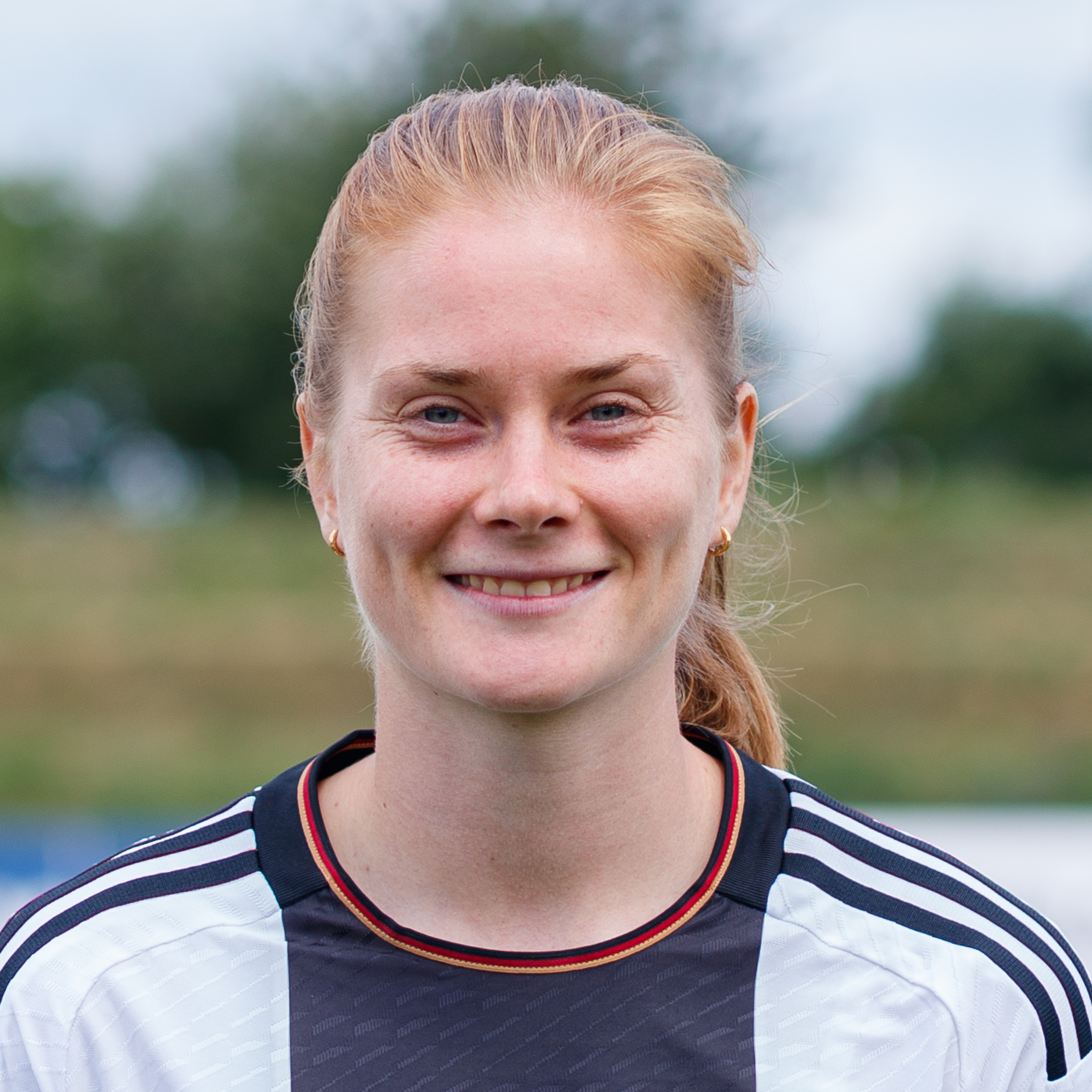
- Nüsken with Germany in 2023

Personal information
- Full name: Sjoeke Nüsken
- Date of birth: 22 January 2001 (age 25)
- Place of birth: Hamm, North Rhine-Westphalia, Germany
- Height: 1.74 m (5 ft 9 in)
- Position: Midfielder

Team information
- Current team: Chelsea
- Number: 6

Youth career
- 2006–2009: Hammer SpVg
- 2009–2019: Westfalia Rhynern
- 2017: FSV Gütersloh 2009

Senior career*
Years	Team	Apps	(Gls)
2019–2023	Eintracht Frankfurt	83	(11)
2023–	Chelsea	67	(14)

International career^{‡}
2015–2016	Germany U15	6	(2)
2016	Germany U16	4	(1)
2016–2017	Germany U17	20	(8)
2017–2019	Germany U19	16	(14)
2018	Germany U20	4	(0)
2021–	Germany	61	(8)
Medal record
Olympic Games
Bronze medal – third place	2024 Paris	Team
UEFA Women's Nations League
Bronze medal – third place	2024 France–Netherlands–Spain
- * Club domestic league appearances and goals as of 15:15, 21 November 2026 (UTC) ‡ National team caps and goals as of 21:05, 13 October 2026 (UTC)

Sjoeke Nüsken (German: [ˈsjɔʊkə ˈnʏskŋ̍]; born 22 January 2001) is a German professional footballer who plays as a midfielder or defender for Women's Super League club Chelsea and the Germany national team. She is known for her versatility, positioning, and goalscoring.

== Club career ==
=== Early career ===
Before she focused on playing football, at the age of eleven, Nüsken was the best German tennis player in her age class. In retrospect, she explained her preference for football: "I'm just a team player. It's so much more fun for me to celebrate with the whole team than just for myself. And above all, my sister was also a footballer, which made the decision easier".

Up to the age of 18, Nüsken played in a boys team at SV Westfalia Rhynern in the town of Hamm. In her last season with the club, she needed permission by the German Football Association, having surpassed the level up to which girls were allowed to play in a boys team. In 2017 she played a one-off game for the U17s of FSV Gütersloh 2009.

At the age of 14 Nüsken was named to the Westphalia U14 squad, and played three games in the Länderpokal, the German national tournament for regional teams. In later years, she played eight games with the U16 and four games with the U18 Westphalia squad, also in the Länderpokal.

=== Eintracht Frankfurt ===
In April 2019, she signed a three-year contract with seven-time German champions 1. FFC Frankfurt (from the 2020–21 season competing as Eintracht Frankfurt). On 15 September 2019, she made her debut in the Bundesliga in the game against FF USV Jena, after recovering from a broken leg, coming on as a substitute for Laura Störzel. On 13 October 2019, she was in Frankfurt's starting eleven for the first time. On 27 October 2019, she scored her first Bundesliga goal, the match winner against MSV Duisburg, 2–1.

=== Chelsea ===
==== 2023–24 season ====
For the 2023–24 season, Nüsken joined Chelsea, signing a contract until 30 June 2026. On 1 October 2023, she made her debut for Chelsea in the WSL game against Tottenham (2–1). On 22 October 2023, she netted her first three goals for Chelsea, scoring a hat-trick against Brighton. She scored the first two goals in the 5–0 win against Sunderland in the 2023–24 Conti Cup quarterfinal. On 15 March 2024, in the 3–1 home win against Arsenal, Nüsken scored twice. Four days later, in the Champions League quarter-final against Ajax, Nüsken netted another brace, as Chelsea secured their fifth win in sixteen days. On 18 May 2024, Nüsken scored in Chelsea's 6–0 victory over Manchester United at Old Trafford, a win that secured the team's fifth consecutive Women's Super League title. She finished her first season with the club with 12 goals in all competitions, having made 23 starts and 15 substitute appearances.

==== 2024–25 season ====
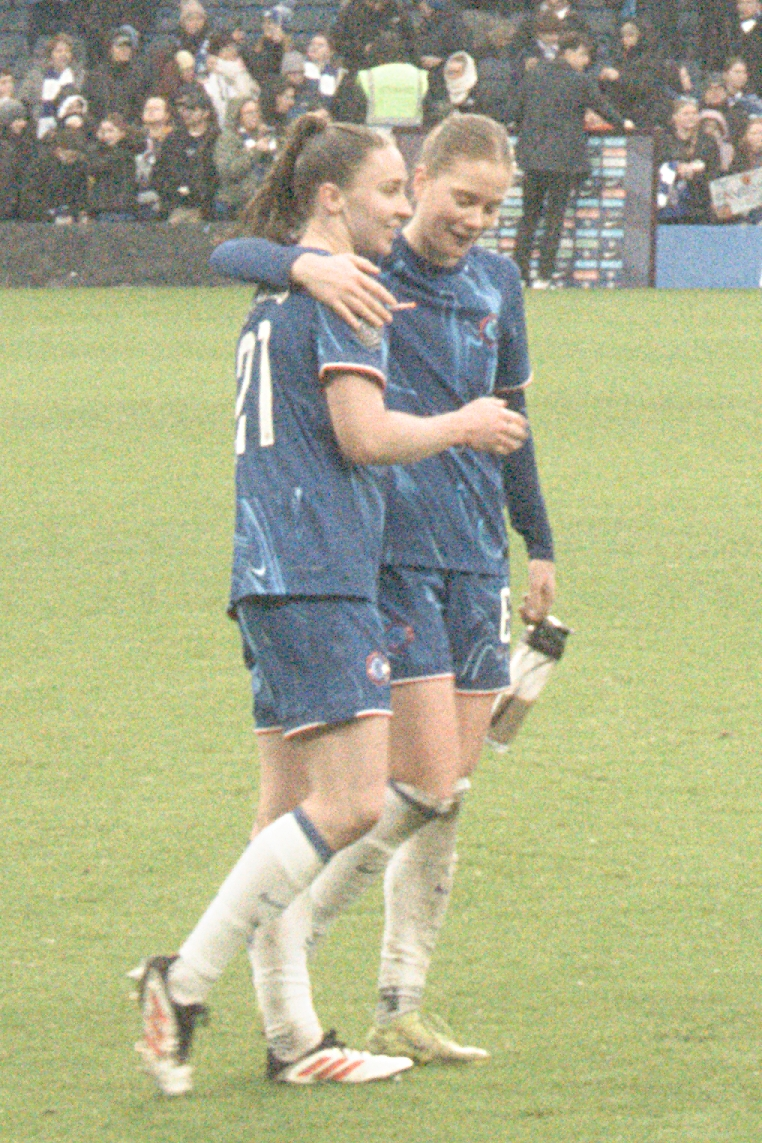
Nüsken with Niamh Charles in 2025

During the 2024–25 season, new Chelsea head coach Sonia Bompastor highlighted Nüsken's leadership on the pitch, naming her as one of the key figures guiding the team, alongside experienced players like Millie Bright and Lucy Bronze. In September 2024, Nüsken was nominated for the Ballon d'Or Féminin, recognising her performances for Chelsea and the German national team during the 2023–24 season. She finished in 25th place in the final rankings. On 8 October 2024, she scored her first goal of the season in Chelsea's 3–2 victory over Real Madrid in the UEFA Women's Champions League. Her early header gave Chelsea the lead within three minutes of the match. In December 2024 Nüsken was voted by The Guardian at the 34th place among the top 100 women footballers in the world. On 8 December 2024, Nüsken scored her first league goals of the season, netting a brace in Chelsea's 4–2 victory against Brighton. Four days later, she marked her 50th appearance for Chelsea by scoring in a 6–1 Champions League win over FC Twente.

Nüsken featured in 36 matches for Chelsea throughout the 2024–25 season. Over the course of the campaign, she was predominantly deployed as a defensive midfielder, showcasing her versatility and tactical awareness. Her performances were characterised by high energy, vision, and adaptability, as she contributed both defensively and offensively. Notably, Nüsken recorded the third-highest number of minutes played among the Chelsea squad in the WSL, as the club became the first team to complete a 22-game season unbeaten. In recognition of her consistent displays, Nüsken was included in the Barclays WSL Team of the Season, announced in May 2025.

==== 2025–26 season ====
On 6 October 2025, Nüsken signed a new contract with Chelsea, extending her stay at the club until the summer of 2027. She scored her first goal of the season on 10 December in Chelsea's 6–0 Champions League win over Roma and provided an assist for Lucy Bronze's goal later in the game. On 15 February, Nüsken scored in a 2–0 Women's Super League win against Liverpool at Kingsmeadow, opening the scoring from a cross by Lauren James. In March, she started in the FA Women's League Cup final against Manchester United on 15 March 2026, as Chelsea secured a 2–0 victory to win the competition. Later that month, Nüsken scored the winning goal in a 4–3 home league victory over Aston Villa, netting in the 82nd minute. She made her 100th appearance for Chelsea against Everton in a 4–1 victory on 26 April 2026.

== International career ==
=== Youth ===
Nüsken has represented Germany at every youth level from Under-15.

Nüsken made her international debut on 28 October 2015, at the age of 14, coming on as a substitute in the 52nd minute of the U15 national team's 5–1 win against Scotland. Two days later she scored her first international goal, in the first minute of the 6–0 win against the same opponents. This time she was substituted at half-time. On 27 April 2016, she scored her second international goal in the 3–3 draw against the Netherlands, her only full match for Germany U15.

In July 2016 Nüsken was a part of the U16 national team that finished second behind Norway in the Nordic Cup. In the 9–0 win against Finland, that saw nine different goal scorers, she netted Germany's seventh goal, which turned out to be her only goal for Germany U16.

Hardly one month later, on 28 August 2016, Nüsken made her debut in the U17 national team at the U17 Four Nations Tournament in Austria, and scored her first U17 goal in the 6–0 win over Romania. She was a part of the U17 team that won the 2017 U17 European Championship in the Czech Republic, playing all games in the qualification and the final tournament. The semi-final against Norway was decided by a penalty shoot-out. In the shoot-out, Nüsken converted her penalty kick to make it 2-2, after which Germany won 3–2. Also the final against Spain was won on penalties.

In September 2017, Nüsken made her debut in the German U19 team in the qualifying round for the 2018 U19 European Championship. She played several matches in the qualification, but was left out of the squad for the final tournament. Instead, she was named to the German U20 squad for the 2018 U20 European Championship in France. She debuted on 24 July 2018 in a friendly against the Netherlands. At the World Cup in August 2018, she played in the 1–0 win against Nigeria in the first group match and in the 2–0 win against China in the second group match, as well as in the quarter-finals, in which Germany lost 3–1 to eventual world champions Japan.

In October 2018, Nüsken returned to the U19 team, in the qualifying round for the 2019 U19 European Championship. She scored six times in the 21–0 win against Estonia, the biggest win ever by a German women's national team. In the elite round that took place in April 2019, Nüsken captained the German squad against Greece, and scored the opener in the wins to both Greece and the Czech Republic. With 12 goals, she was the top scorer in the qualification. A fibular fracture sustained in a match with Westfalia Rhynern prevented her from playing the final tournament.

In October 2019, Nüsken played the qualifying round for the 2020 U19 European Championship. She helped Germany win their three matches and qualify for the elite round. Due to COVID-19, however, the remainder of tournament was cancelled.

=== Senior ===
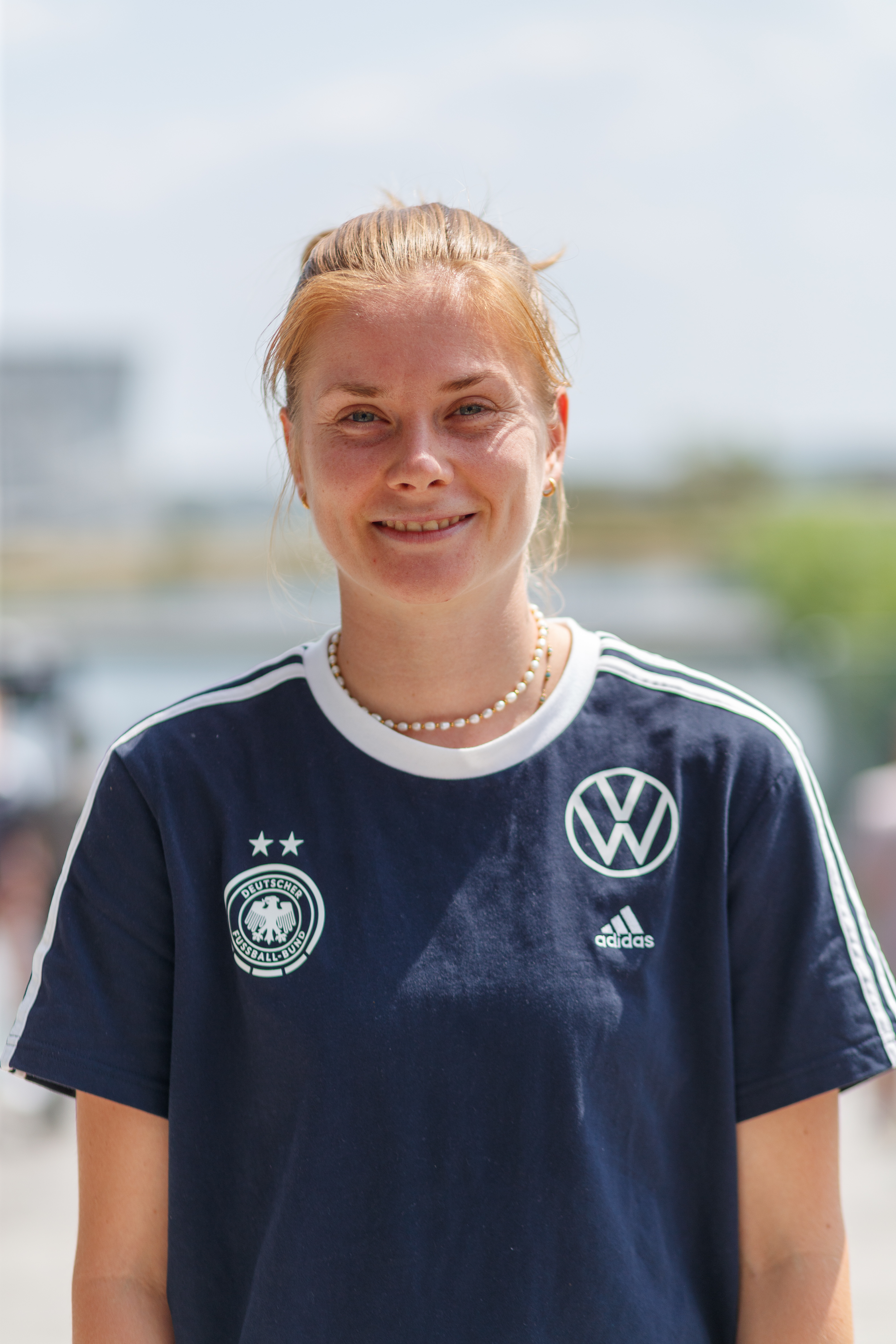
Nüsken in 2023

Nüsken received her first Germany Women's Senior camp call up in December 2018. The newly appointed national coach Martina Voss-Tecklenburg called her up for the winter training camp in January 2019 in Marbella, at a time when she still played in the boys team at SV Westfalia Rhynern.

Nüsken won her first senior cap on 21 February 2021 in a friendly against Belgium, coming on as a substitute for Sara Däbritz in the 73rd minute. On 10 April 2021, her first international goal was the opener in a friendly against Australia (5–2).

On 8 July 2023, Nüsken was named to the German squad for the 2023 World Cup. She came on as a substitute in the second group stage match, in which Germany suffered a surprise defeat against Colombia. Germany were eliminated in the group stage.

In July 2024, Nüsken was called up for the 2024 Summer Olympics. She consistently held a starting position in every game for Germany and contributed to the team's achievement of the bronze medal.

In June 2025, Nüsken was called up to the German squad for the UEFA Women's Euro 2025 tournament in Switzerland. Following an injury to captain Giulia Gwinn in the first group match against Poland, head coach Christian Wück named Nüsken as the new vice-captain for the remainder of the tournament, with Janina Minge taking over the captaincy. On 8 July 2025, Nüsken scored from the penalty spot in Germany's 2–1 group‑stage win over Denmark to help secure progression to the quarter‑finals. In the quarter‑final against France on 19 July 2025, she headed Germany level at 1–1 and later converted her penalty in the shoot‑out as Germany won 6–5 to reach the semi-finals.

On 5 June 2026, Nüsken captained Germany for the first time, leading the team in a 2–0 victory over Norway in 2027 FIFA Women's World Cup qualifying, which secured Germany's qualification for the 2027 World Cup.

== Personal life ==
Nüsken was studying civil engineering at the RheinMain University of Applied Sciences, which she graduated from in 2024. Her sister Hjördis, who is four years older, was capped for Germany at youth level, before her football career was ended by injury.

== Career statistics ==
=== Club ===
As of match played 21 November 2026

Appearances and goals by club, season and competition
Club	Season	League			National cup (Note: Includes DFB-Pokal, Women's FA Cup)		League cup (Note: Includes FA Women's League Cup)		Continental (Note: Includes UEFA Women's Champions League)		Total	
Club	Season	Division	Apps	Goals	Apps	Goals	Apps	Goals	Apps	Goals	Apps	Goals
Eintracht Frankfurt	2019–20	Frauen-Bundesliga	17	5	2	0	—		—		19	5
Eintracht Frankfurt	2020–21	Frauen-Bundesliga	22	2	4	0	—		—		26	2
Eintracht Frankfurt	2021–22	Frauen-Bundesliga	22	2	1	1	—		—		23	3
Eintracht Frankfurt	2022–23	Frauen-Bundesliga	22	2	2	2	—		2	0	26	4
Eintracht Frankfurt	Total		83	11	9	3	—		2	0	94	14
Chelsea	2023–24	Women's Super League	21	8	4	0	3	2	10	2	38	12
Chelsea	2024–25	Women's Super League	21	2	5	0	3	1	7	2	36	5
Chelsea	2025–26	Women's Super League	15	2	4	0	3	1	7	2	29	5
Chelsea	2026–27	Women's Super League	10	2	0	0	—		6	0	16	2
Chelsea	Total		67	14	13	0	9	4	30	6	119	24
Career total			150	25	22	3	9	4	32	6	213	38

=== International ===
As of match played 13 October 2026

Appearances and goals by national team and year
National team	Year	Apps	Goals
Germany	2021	9	2
Germany	2022	4	0
Germany	2023	10	1
Germany	2024	16	1
Germany	2025	14	3
Germany	2026	8	1
Total		61	8

Scores and results list Germany's goal tally first, score column indicates score after each Nüsken goal.

List of international goals scored Sjoeke Nüsken
No.	Date	Venue	Opponent	Score	Result	Competition
1.	10 April 2021	Brita-Arena, Wiesbaden, Germany	Australia	1–0	5–2	Friendly
2.	26 November 2021	Eintracht-Stadion, Braunschweig, Germany	Turkey	7–0	8–0	2023 FIFA Women's World Cup qualification
3.	27 October 2023	Rhein-Neckar-Arena, Sinsheim, Germany	Wales	4–1	5–1	2023–24 UEFA Women's Nations League
4.	29 November 2024	Letzigrund, Zurich, Switzerland	Switzerland	1–0	6–0	Friendly
5.	21 February 2025	Rat Verlegh Stadion, Breda, Netherlands	Netherlands	2–1	2–2	2025 UEFA Women's Nations League
6.	8 July 2025	St. Jakob-Park, Basel, Switzerland	Denmark	1–1	2–1	UEFA Women's Euro 2025
7.	19 July 2025	St. Jakob-Park, Basel, Switzerland	France	1–1	1–1 (a.e.t.) (6–5 p)	UEFA Women's Euro 2025
8.	9 October 2026	Wildparkstadion, Karlsruhe, Germany	Australia	4–2	4–2	Friendly

== Honours ==
Chelsea

- Women's Super League: 2023–24, 2024–25
- Women's FA Cup: 2024–25
- FA Women's League Cup: 2024–25, 2025–26

Germany U17

- UEFA U-17 Women's Championship: 2017

Germany

- UEFA Women's Nations League third place: 2023–24
- Summer Olympic Games bronze medal: 2024

Individual

- Silbernes Lorbeerblatt: 2024
