= Wieke Kaptein =

Dutch footballer (born 2005)

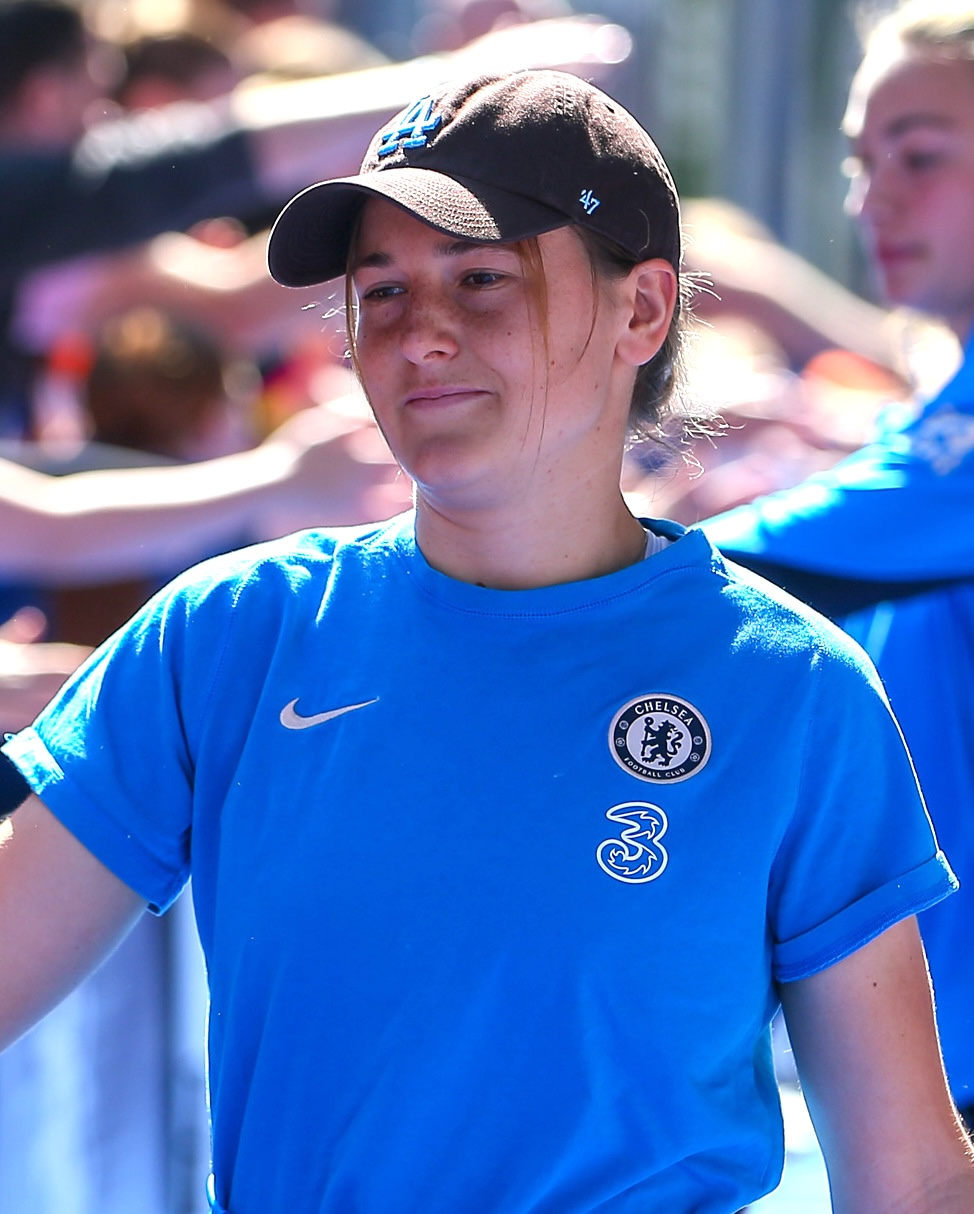
- Kaptein in 2025

Personal information
- Full name: Wieke Hendrikje Maria Kaptein
- Date of birth: 29 August 2005 (age 21)
- Place of birth: Hengelo, Netherlands
- Height: 1.71 m (5 ft 7 in)
- Position: Midfielder

Team information
- Current team: Chelsea
- Number: 19

Youth career
- Achilles '12
- Twente

Senior career*
Years	Team	Apps	(Gls)
2021–2023	Twente	40	(3)
2023–	Chelsea	46	(4)
2023–2024	→ Twente (loan)	22	(3)

International career^{‡}
2019	Netherlands U15	4	(0)
2021	Netherlands U16	3	(0)
2021–2022	Netherlands U17	5	(0)
2022–2023	Netherlands U19	7	(0)
2023–	Netherlands	35	(4)
- * Club domestic league appearances and goals as of 21 November 2026 ‡ National team caps and goals as of 13 October 2026

Wieke Hendrikje Maria Kaptein (Dutch: [ˈʋikə ˈɦɛndrɪkjə maːˈrijaː ˈkɑptɛin]; born 29 August 2005) is a Dutch professional footballer who plays as a midfielder for Women's Super League club Chelsea and the Netherlands national team.

== Club career ==
Kaptein started playing football at Achilles '12. Already at the age of 15, she received a professional contract with FC Twente Enschede. Capping off her first season with the league title, she also featured in the 2021/22 UEFA Champions League qualifying, scoring the goal in the opening game against FC Nike Tbilisi to make it 9–0. Twente, however, lost out to Benfica in the Champions Path final. A year later, Benfica was the last stop on the way to the group stage.

In March 2023, Kaptein was voted one of the nine best talents in the world.

Kaptein made her debut for Chelsea on 27 September, 2024. She scored her first goal for the club in the 5–0 win against Everton on 3 November.

== International career ==
Kaptein played some games for the Dutch junior teams from the U-15. With the U-17 team, she took part in the first and second qualifying rounds of the 2022 U-17 European Championship, which was successfully completed in April 2022, where she was captain in the second round. However, she was not part of the squad for the finals in May 2022, because she was wanted for the end of the league season. With the U-19 team, she qualified in October 2022 for the second qualifying round for the 2023 U-19 European Championship. She was not used in the second round in April 2023, as she was nominated for the senior national team games that took place at the same time.

On 11 April 2023, she had her first senior cap. She came on as a substitute in the 81st minute for Lieke Martens in a friendly they won 4–1 against Poland.

On 30 June 2023, she was nominated for the World Cup finals. She was the youngest World Cup debutant ever for the Dutch national team.

== Career statistics ==
=== Club ===
As of match played 21 November 2026

Appearances and goals by club, season and competition
Club	Season	League			National cup (Note: Includes KNVB Women's Cup, Women's FA Cup)		League cup (Note: Includes Eredivisie Cup, Women's League Cup)		Europe		Other		Total	
Club	Season	Division	Apps	Goals	Apps	Goals	Apps	Goals	Apps	Goals	Apps	Goals	Apps	Goals
Twente	2021–22	Vrouwen Eredivisie	20	0	2	0	3	0	4	1	—		29	1
Twente	2022–23	Vrouwen Eredivisie	20	3	4	0	3	0	2	0	1 (Note: Appearance(s) in Dutch Women's Super Cup)	0	30	3
Twente (loan)	2023–24	Vrouwen Eredivisie	22	3	2	0	1	0	4	0	1	1	30	4
Twente (loan)	Total		62	6	8	0	7	0	10	1	2	1	89	8
Chelsea	2024–25	Women's Super League	16	2	4	0	3	0	10	2	—		33	4
Chelsea	2025–26	Women's Super League	20	2	4	0	3	2	8	2	—		35	6
Chelsea	2026–27	Women's Super League	10	0	0	0	—		7	1	—		17	1
Chelsea	Total		46	4	8	0	6	2	25	5	0	0	85	11
Career total			108	10	16	0	13	2	35	6	2	1	174	19

=== International ===
As of match played 13 October 2026

Appearances and goals by national team and year
National team	Year	Apps	Goals
Netherlands	2023	5	0
Netherlands	2024	9	1
Netherlands	2025	13	1
Netherlands	2026	8	2
Total		35	4

Scores and results list Netherlands' goal tally first, score column indicates score after each Kaptein goal.

List of international goals scored by Wieke Kaptein
No.	Date	Venue	Opponent	Score	Result	Competition
1	29 November 2024	Sparta Stadion Het Kasteel, Rotterdam, Netherlands	China	1–1	4–1	Friendly
2	8 April 2025	Stadion Schnabelholz, Altach, Austria	Austria	1–1	3–1	2025 UEFA Women's Nations League
3	18 April 2026	Stade de l'Abbé-Deschamps, Auxerre, France	France	1–1	1–1	2027 FIFA World Cup qualification
4	9 June 2026	Asito Stadion, Almelo, Netherlands	Poland	1–0	3–1	2027 FIFA World Cup qualification

== Honours ==
Twente

- Vrouwen Eredivisie: 2021–22, 2023–24
- KNVB Women's Cup: 2022–23
- Eredivisie Cup: 2021–22, 2022–23, 2023–24
- Dutch Women's Super Cup: 2022, 2023

Chelsea

- Women's Super League: 2024–25
- Women's FA Cup: 2024–25
- FA Women's League Cup: 2024–25, 2025–26

Individual

- Eredivisie Talent of the Year: 2021–22
