= Becky Spencer =

Jamaican footballer (born 1991)

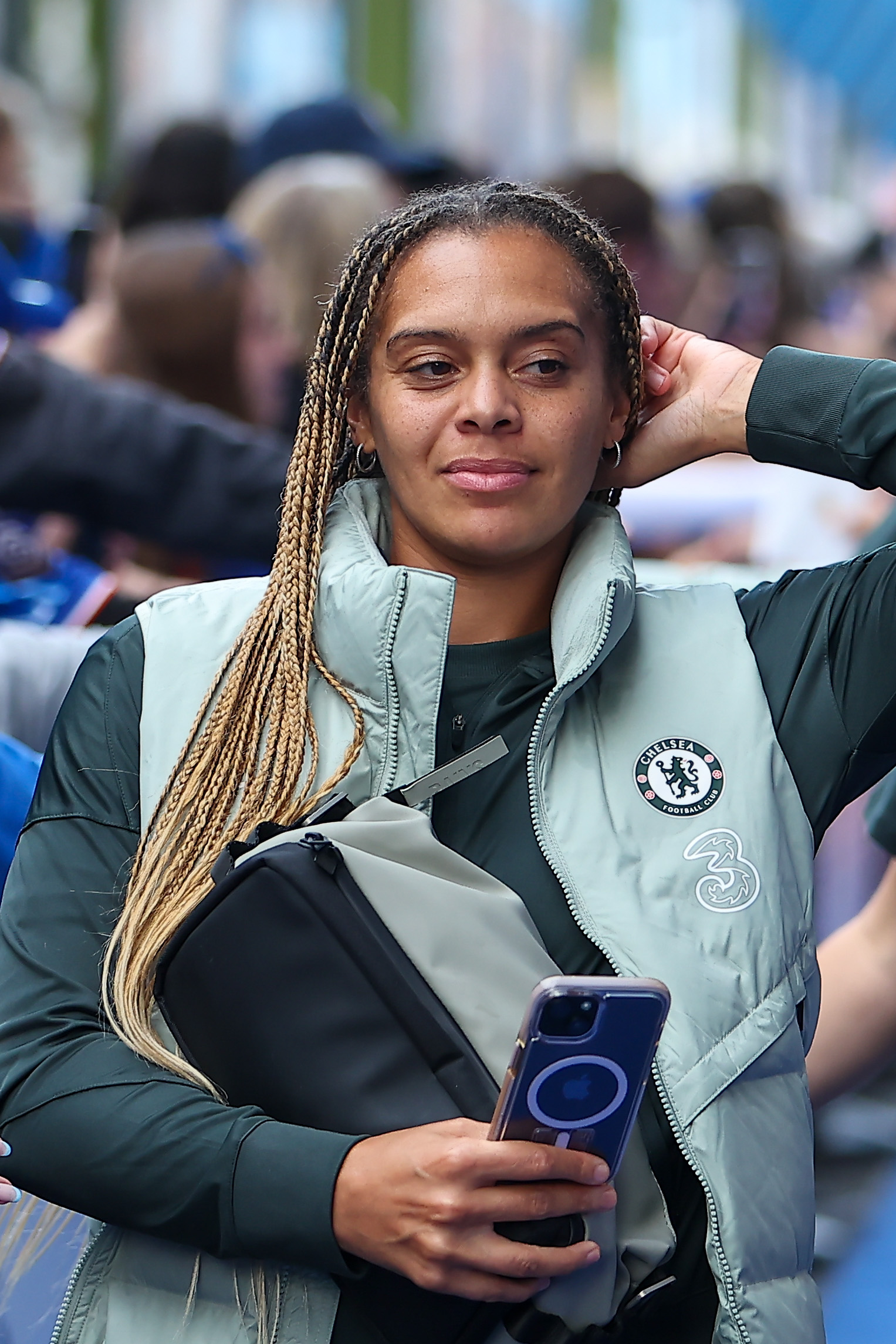
- Spencer in 2023

Personal information
- Full name: Rebecca Leigh Spencer
- Date of birth: 22 February 1991 (age 35)
- Place of birth: Harrow, London, England
- Height: 1.67 m (5 ft 6 in)
- Position: Goalkeeper

Team information
- Current team: Chelsea
- Number: 38

Youth career
- 2001–2006: Arsenal

Senior career*
Years	Team	Apps	(Gls)
2006–2011	Arsenal	10	(0)
2009	→ Nottingham Forest (loan)	1	(0)
2010–2011	→ Gillingham (loan)	12	(0)
2011–2012	Soyaux	3	(0)
2012	Arsenal	0	(0)
2012	Birmingham City	8	(0)
2013	Arsenal	0	(0)
2013–2015	Birmingham City	30	(0)
2016–2018	Chelsea	8	(0)
2018–2019	West Ham United	12	(0)
2019–2025	Tottenham Hotspur	76	(0)
2025	→ Chelsea (loan)	0	(0)
2025–	Chelsea	0	(0)

International career^{‡}
2008–2010	England U19	24	(1)
2008–2010	England U20	7	(0)
2021–	Jamaica	25	(0)
Medal record
Representing England
UEFA Women's Under-19 Championship
Gold medal – first place	2009 Belarus
Silver medal – second place	2010 Macedonia
Representing Jamaica
CONCACAF W Championship
Third place	2022 Mexico
- * Club domestic league appearances and goals as of 12 July 2025 ‡ National team caps and goals as of 19 April 2026

Rebecca Leigh Spencer (born 22 February 1991) is a professional footballer who plays as a goalkeeper for Women's Super League club Chelsea and the Jamaica national team. Over a career spanning two decades, she has made more than 200 senior appearances, won multiple English domestic titles, and been part of Arsenal's UEFA Women's Cup-winning squad. Her career has included spells in England and France, as well as appearances at three FIFA World Cup tournaments across youth and senior levels. In February 2023, she was ranked eighth for Women's Super League's all-time leading goalkeepers for clean sheets, with 28. She was also ranked sixth in the world in the 2023 International Federation of Football History & Statistics (IFFHS) Women's World Best Goalkeeper rankings.

At the 2023 FIFA Women's World Cup, Spencer recorded 17 saves, the fifth-highest total among goalkeepers at the tournament despite only playing four matches, and kept three consecutive clean sheets against France, Panama and Brazil. Her performances helped Jamaica become the first Caribbean nation to advance to the knockout stage of the Women's World Cup, and she was selected as goalkeeper in CONCACAF's tournament Best XI. Spencer became made Jamaican national team's tournament history with total 17 saves. The following year, Spencer also helped Tottenham Hotspur reach their first Women's FA Cup final in 2024, saving two penalties in their quarter-final shootout victory over Manchester City.

== Early life ==
Born in Northwick Park Hospital, Spencer attended Welldon Park First and Middle School, appearing as the school goalkeeper aged 10. She then attended Rooks Heath College and in January 2009 was a fitness student in St Albans.

== Club career ==
Spencer began her career as a junior with Watford before joining the Centre of Excellence at Arsenal in 2001. She progressed through the centre of excellence age groups and joined the senior team in 2006, where she was primarily the understudy to first choice keeper Emma Byrne. She made her FA Women's Premier League debut and in April 2008 was in goal as Arsenal beat Millwall Lionesses 3–1 in the London Cup Final, having been in the Arsenal side beaten by Charlton Athletic in the 2006 final.

Spencer was an unused substitute in the 2008 FA Women's Cup Final as Arsenal beat Leeds Carnegie and in the 2009 final as Arsenal beat Sunderland. She has also won an FA Women's Premier League Cup winners' medal having been an unused substitute for Arsenal's win against Leeds in March 2007.

Spencer joined Gillingham on loan for 2010–11. She said "I have had a frustrating few years regarding getting regular game time and Gillingham has been the right choice of club to do this." In December 2011 Spencer left Arsenal for French Division 1 Féminine club ASJ Soyaux. She returned to England in March 2012 for family reasons, briefly rejoining Arsenal and appearing on the bench for two matches in the Champions League. Spencer then signed for Birmingham City, making her debut in a 4–0 FA Women's Cup win over Sunderland. She went on to play a pivotal role as Birmingham defeated Chelsea in the 2012 FA Women's Cup Final on penalties.

Spencer returned to Arsenal for the first half of 2013, but left Arsenal for a third time in July 2013. She returned to Birmingham City. In January 2016, Spencer announced her transfer from Birmingham to WSL champions Chelsea. Birmingham described the transfer fee banked from Chelsea as "an extremely good deal for the club".

Spencer moved to West Ham United in June 2018. She made 12 league appearances and four in the FA Women's League Cup. She was an unused substitute in the side that played against Manchester City in the 2018–19 FA Women's Cup final. In June 2019, it was announced that Spencer would leave West Ham upon the expiration of her contract.

On 5 July 2019, Spencer signed for Tottenham Hotspur. She was part of Tottenham's first-ever squad to compete in the Women's Super League. In March 2025, she returned to Chelsea on an emergency goalkeeper loan for the remainder of the 2024–25 season. The loan move was made permanent on 7 July that year with Spencer signing a one-year contract with the option for a further year.

== International career ==
Spencer has represented England at Under–15, Under–19 and Under–20 level. She was the first choice for the Under–20s World Cup side in 2008. In 2009, she was a key player as England's Under–19s side won the UEFA European Women's Under-19 Championship in Belarus, keeping clean sheets throughout the tournament, and was named as one of ten 'emerging talents' from the tournament on the UEFA website. She was called up to Mark Sampson's senior England squad in 2016 and was an unused substitute against Estonia.

Spencer also qualifies for Jamaica through her heritage and received her first call-up to the Jamaican national team in June 2021. During that camp, Spencer made her senior international debut in a 1–0 win over Nigeria. She wears the number 13 jersey.

== Career statistics ==
=== Club ===
The following tables record Spencer's domestic league appearances and available goalkeeping statistics. Clean sheets and saves are shown where reliable records exist; historical figures are incomplete for several earlier seasons.

==== Domestic league ====
Domestic league appearances and goalkeeping statistics
Club	Season	League appearances	Clean sheets	Saves
Arsenal	2006–2011, 2012–2013	10	—	—
Nottingham Forest (loan)	2009–10	1	—	—
Gillingham (loan)	2010–11	12	—	—
ASJ Soyaux	2011–12	3	—	—
Birmingham City	2012–2015	38	—	—
Chelsea	2016	6	—	—
Chelsea	2017–18	2	2	—
West Ham United	2018–19	12	2	45
Tottenham Hotspur	2019–20	14	4	49
Tottenham Hotspur	2020–21	16	2	59
Tottenham Hotspur	2021–22	11	5	16
Tottenham Hotspur	2022–23	11	0	40
Tottenham Hotspur	2023–24	16	2	45
Tottenham Hotspur	2024–25	8	1	26
Recorded league appearances		160	—	—

Statistics are drawn from published league records and goalkeeping databases. Earlier clean-sheet and save figures remain incomplete.

Tottenham Hotspur credited Spencer with 14 Women's Super League clean sheets in 76 league appearances. FBref records 13, but does not credit her with a clean sheet for the 1–0 victory over Leicester City on 17 March 2024, despite recording her as playing the full 90 minutes without conceding. The table follows Tottenham's club-reported figure.

==== Other competitions ====
Selected cup and continental goalkeeping statistics
Club	Competition	Season or period	Appearances	Clean sheets	Saves
Birmingham City	UEFA Women's Champions League	2013–14	8	—	20
Tottenham Hotspur	All competitions	2019–2025	95	18	—

During the 2013–14 UEFA Women's Champions League, Spencer recorded 20 saves, placing joint fifth among goalkeepers in the competition. Birmingham City reached the semi-finals.

Tottenham Hotspur confirmed that Spencer made 95 appearances and kept 18 clean sheets across all competitions during her time at the club, including 76 league appearances and 14 league clean sheets.

The Tottenham all-competition figures include league matches listed in the preceding table and must not be added to those figures when calculating career totals.

=== International ===
==== Major international tournaments ====
Selected international tournament goalkeeping statistics
National team	Tournament	Year	Appearances	Clean sheets	Saves
England U19	UEFA Women's Under-19 Championship	2009	5	5	—
Jamaica	CONCACAF W Championship	2022	5	3	—
Jamaica	FIFA Women's World Cup	2023	4	3	17

Spencer kept five consecutive clean sheets as England won the 2009 UEFA Women's Under-19 Championship without conceding a goal in the final tournament.

At the 2022 CONCACAF W Championship, she appeared in five matches, recording clean sheets against Mexico, Haiti and Costa Rica, as Jamaica finished third.

At the 2023 FIFA Women's World Cup, Spencer made 17 saves according to FIFA's official tournament statistics, the fifth-highest total of any goalkeeper. She kept three clean sheets and conceded one goal in four appearances.

==== Senior international appearances ====
Jamaica senior international appearances by year
Year	Appearances
2021	1
2022	8
2023	8
2024	2
2025	3
2026	3
Total as of 18 April 2026	25

Complete senior international clean-sheet and save totals have not yet been established. The tournament figures above represent only the competitions specified, not the player's entire international career.

== Honours ==
=== Club ===
Arsenal

- UEFA Women's Cup: 2006–07 (squad member)
- FA Women's Premier League National Division: 2006–07, 2007–08, 2008–09, 2009–10
- Women's FA Cup: 2006–07, 2007–08, 2008–09, 2012–13 (squad honours)
- FA Women's Premier League Cup: 2006–07, 2008–09 (squad honours)

Birmingham City

- Women's FA Cup: 2011–12

Chelsea

- Women's Super League: 2017 Spring Series, 2017–18, 2024–25
- Women's FA Cup: 2017–18, 2024–25
- Women's League Cup: 2024–25, 2025–26

West Ham United

- Women's FA Cup runner-up: 2018–19 (unused substitute)

Tottenham Hotspur

- Women's FA Cup runner-up: 2023–24

=== International ===
England U19

- UEFA Women's Under-19 Championship: 2009
- UEFA Women's Under-19 Championship runner-up: 2010

Jamaica

- CONCACAF W Championship third place: 2022

=== Individual ===
- UEFA Women's Under-19 Championship emerging talents selection: 2009
- 2023 FIFA Women's World Cup Player of the Match: Jamaica vs Brazil
- CONCACAF FIFA Women's World Cup Best XI: 2023
- IFFHS Women's World Best Goalkeeper: sixth place (2023)

=== Notable tournament finishes ===
International

- 2008 UEFA Women's Under-19 Championship: group stage (England U19)
- 2008 FIFA U-20 Women's World Cup: quarter-finals (England U20)
- 2010 FIFA U-20 Women's World Cup: group stage (England U20)
- 2023 FIFA Women's World Cup: round of 16 (Jamaica)

Club

- 2013–14 UEFA Women's Champions League: semi-finals (Birmingham City)
