= 2025–26 Women's League Cup =

Tournament details
- Country: England
- Dates: 24 September 2025 – 15 March 2026
- Teams: 24

Final positions
- Champions: Chelsea (4th title)
- Runners-up: Manchester United

Tournament statistics
- Matches played: 41
- Goals scored: 127 (3.1 per match)
- Attendance: 65,044 (1,586 per match)
- Top goal scorer(s): (Germany) Shekiera Martinez (West Ham United); 4 goals

The 2025–26 Women's League Cup was the 15th edition of the Women's Super League and Women's Championship's league cup competition. It was sponsored by Subway, which had been a partner of the competition since 2024, and was officially known as the Subway Women's League Cup for sponsorship reasons. All 24 teams from the WSL and Championship took part in the competition. Chelsea were the title holders. They successfully defended their title after defeating first time finalists Manchester United 2–0 in the final.

This was the last season of the tournament in its group and knockout stages format, and the last involving teams competing in the UEFA Women's Champions League.

== Format ==
The competition kept the same format as the previous season, starting with a group stage split regionally. Teams competing in the UEFA Women's Champions League group stage were exempt from the League Cup group stage, earning a provisional bye to the quarter-finals. As a result, the initial group stage draw made on 30 July 2025 featured 21 of the 24 teams. The three teams excluded from the draw were Arsenal and Chelsea, who automatically entered the Champions League group stage, and Manchester United who advanced in the Champions League qualifying rounds, therefore joining the League Cup at the quarter-finals.

The first place team in each of the five groups qualified for the knockout stage.

== Group stage ==
=== Group A ===
Pos	Team	Pld	W	PW	PL	L	GF	GA	GD	Pts	Qualification
1	Manchester City	3	2	1	0	0	8	4	+4	8	Advanced to knockout stage
2	Everton	3	1	1	0	1	5	5	0	5	
3	Nottingham Forest	3	1	0	1	1	3	4	−1	4	
4	Newcastle United	3	0	0	1	2	5	8	−3	1	

Source: Women's League Cup
Rules for classification: 1) Points; 2) Goal difference; 3) Number of goals scored; 4) Number of wins; 5) Head-to-head record
24 September 2025
18:45 BST

Nottingham Forest	2–1	Newcastle United
Claypole 55'; Smith 58'	Report	Lumsden 54'

Field Mill, Mansfield
Attendance: 258
Referee: Alice Parker
24 September 2025
19:00 BST

Manchester City	3–1	Everton
Rose 21'; Hasegawa 53'; Miedema 76'	Report	Kitagawa 82'

Academy Stadium, Manchester
Attendance: 1,350
Referee: Sophie Dennington

19 October 2025
14:00 BST

Newcastle United	3–3	Manchester City
Joel 11'; Gregory 82'; Hayles 90+1'	Report	Coombs 45+3'; Hasegawa 47'; Prior 63'
Penalties
Hayles (penalty scored); Mannion (penalty scored); Lumsden (penalty scored); Murphy (penalty scored); Nobbs (penalty scored); Gregory (penalty scored); Stokes (penalty missed)	6–7	(penalty scored) Casparij; (penalty scored) Hasegawa; (penalty scored) Shaw; (penalty scored) Greenwood; (penalty scored) Miedema; (penalty scored) Ouahabi; (penalty scored) Blindkilde Brown

Gateshead International Stadium, Gateshead
Attendance: 3,012
Referee: Stacey Fullicks
19 October 2025
14:00 BST

Everton	1–1	Nottingham Forest
Gago 59'	Report	Claypole 56' (pen.)
Penalties
Gago (penalty scored); Stenevik (penalty scored); Weir (penalty missed); Wheeler (penalty scored); Pacheco (penalty scored)	4–3	(penalty scored) Claypole; (penalty scored) Olding; (penalty missed) Wellings; (penalty scored) Green; (penalty missed) Boye-Hlorkah

Goodison Park, Walton
Attendance: 1,500
Referee: Adewunmi Soneye

22 November 2025
14:00 GMT

Nottingham Forest	0–2	Manchester City
	Report	Clinton 32'; Hemp 38'

City Ground, West Bridgford
Attendance: 2,624
Referee: Lauren Impey
23 November 2025
14:00 GMT

Newcastle United	1–3	Everton
Lumsden 79'	Report	Momiki 31'; Snoeijs 72'; Payne 74'

Gateshead International Stadium, Gateshead
Attendance: 1,153
Referee: Adewunmi Soneye

=== Group B ===
Pos	Team	Pld	W	PW	PL	L	GF	GA	GD	Pts	Qualification
1	Liverpool	3	3	0	0	0	11	2	+9	9	Advanced to knockout stage
2	Sheffield United	3	1	1	0	1	3	5	−2	5	
3	Durham	3	0	0	2	1	3	4	−1	2	
4	Sunderland	3	0	1	0	2	1	7	−6	2	

Source: Women's League Cup
Rules for classification: 1) Points; 2) Goal difference; 3) Number of goals scored; 4) Number of wins; 5) Head-to-head record
24 September 2025
19:00 BST

Liverpool	5–0	Sunderland
Evans 7'; Clark 21'; Shimizu 41'; Haug 71', 88'	Report

Totally Wicked Stadium, St Helens
Attendance: 2,018
Referee: Abby Dearden
24 September 2025
19:00 BST

Durham	1–1	Sheffield United
Cowen 44' (o.g.)	Report	Ralph 18'
Penalties
Pritchard (penalty missed); Hepple (penalty missed); Lambert (penalty scored); Watson (penalty scored); Salicki (penalty missed)	2–3	(penalty scored) Bristow; (penalty missed) Butler; (penalty scored) Foy; (penalty scored) Phillips

Maiden Castle, Durham
Attendance: 617
Referee: Ruby Sykes

16 October 2025
19:00 BST

Durham	1–2	Liverpool
Foster 38'	Report	Holland 27'; Kerr 86'

Maiden Castle, Durham
Attendance: 844
Referee: Lucy May
19 October 2025
14:00 BST

Sunderland	0–1	Sheffield United
	Report	Andrews 39'

Eppleton CW, Hetton-le-Hole
Attendance: 400
Referee: Julia Kings

22 November 2025
18:00 GMT

Sheffield United	1–4	Liverpool
Thomas 44'	Report	Olsson 2', 42', 57'; Enderby 64'

Bramall Lane, Sheffield
Attendance: 2,597
Referee: Lucy May
23 November 2025
14:00 GMT

Sunderland	1–1	Durham
Scarr 50'	Report	Hepple 72'
Penalties
Fenton (penalty scored); Barry (penalty scored); Scarr (penalty scored); Westrup (penalty scored)	4–3	(penalty scored) Hepple; (penalty scored) Watson; (penalty scored) Foster; (penalty missed) Speckmaier; (penalty missed) Briggs

Eppleton CW, Hetton-le-Hole
Attendance: 453
Referee: William Davis

=== Group C ===
Pos	Team	Pld	W	PW	PL	L	GF	GA	GD	Pts	Qualification
1	West Ham United	4	3	0	0	1	12	4	+8	9	Advanced to knockout stage
2	Charlton Athletic	4	3	0	0	1	7	6	+1	9	
3	Brighton & Hove Albion	4	2	0	0	2	6	3	+3	6	
4	Portsmouth	4	1	0	0	3	2	6	−4	3	
5	Southampton	4	1	0	0	3	2	10	−8	3	

Source: Women's League Cup
Rules for classification: 1) Points; 2) Goal difference; 3) Number of goals scored; 4) Number of wins; 5) Head-to-head record
24 September 2025
19:00 BST

Charlton Athletic	1–5	West Ham United
Bradley 55'	Report	Morgan 18'; Paví 48'; Wandeler 65'; Brasero-Carreira 83'; Martinez 89'

The Valley, Charlton
Attendance: 352
Referee: Levi Gray
24 September 2025
19:00 BST

Portsmouth	0–2	Brighton & Hove Albion
	Report	Camacho 4'; Olislagers 28'

Westleigh Park, Havant
Attendance: 623
Referee: Lisa Benn

8 October 2025
19:00 BST

Southampton	1–0	Portsmouth
McAlonie 19'	Report

Ten Acres, Eastleigh
Attendance: 751
Referee: Lauren Impey
8 October 2025
19:00 BST

West Ham United	2–1	Brighton & Hove Albion
Piubel 29'; Martinez 75'	Report	Camacho 15'

Victoria Road, Dagenham
Attendance: 478
Referee: Megan Wilson

19 October 2025
12:00 BST

Charlton Athletic	3–0 (Note: Charlton Athletic were awarded the win after Portsmouth withdrew from the game due to an unprecedented number of injuries and being unable to field a team.) Charlton awarded a 3–0 win	Portsmouth

The Valley, Charlton
19 October 2025
14:00 BST

Brighton & Hove Albion	3–0	Southampton
Seike 68', 90+4'; Kirby 71'	Report

Broadfield Stadium, Crawley
Attendance: 980
Referee: Abigail Byrne

12 November 2025
19:00 GMT

Brighton & Hove Albion	0–1	Charlton Athletic
	Report	McAteer 18'

Broadfield Stadium, Crawley
Attendance: 566
Referee: Ryan Atkin
12 November 2025
19:00 GMT

West Ham United	5–0	Southampton
Asseyi 64', 90+1'; Martinez 78', 90+4'; Morgan 84'	Report

Victoria Road, Dagenham
Attendance: 546
Referee: Megan Wilson

23 November 2025
14:00 GMT

Portsmouth	2–0	West Ham United
Gale 70'; Sheffield 86'	Report

Westleigh Park, Havant
Attendance: 523
Referee: Joanne Horwood
23 November 2025
14:00 GMT

Southampton	1–2	Charlton Athletic
Brazil 70'	Report	Newsham 89'; Hutton 90+7'

Ten Acres, Eastleigh
Attendance: 537
Referee: Aaron Ford

=== Group D ===
Pos	Team	Pld	W	PW	PL	L	GF	GA	GD	Pts	Qualification
1	Crystal Palace	3	2	0	0	1	7	4	+3	6	Advanced to knockout stage
2	Leicester City	3	2	0	0	1	6	4	+2	6	
3	London City Lionesses	3	2	0	0	1	4	2	+2	6	
4	Ipswich Town	3	0	0	0	3	3	10	−7	0	

Source: Women's League Cup
Rules for classification: 1) Points; 2) Goal difference; 3) Number of goals scored; 4) Number of wins; 5) Head-to-head record
24 September 2025
19:30 BST

Crystal Palace	1–2	London City Lionesses
Weerden 11'	Report	Franssi 46'; Parris 78'

Gander Green Lane, Sutton
Attendance: 478
Referee: Stacey Pearson
24 September 2025
19:30 BST

Ipswich Town	1–5	Leicester City
Seaby 39'	Report	O'Brien 45+1'; Ale 47'; Ayane 53'; Kaczmar 78'; Rantala 84'

Colchester Community Stadium, Myland
Attendance: 455
Referee: Richie Watkins

19 October 2025
14:00 BST

Crystal Palace	3–2	Ipswich Town
Watson 38', 45+3'; Swaby 83'	Report	Thomas 45+1'; Peake 69'

Gander Green Lane, Sutton
Attendance: 337
Referee: Levi Gray
19 October 2025
14:00 BST

London City Lionesses	0–1	Leicester City
	Report	Rantala 2'

Hayes Lane, Bromley
Attendance: 990
Referee: Sophie Dennington

23 November 2025
14:00 GMT

Ipswich Town	0–2	London City Lionesses
	Report	Franssi 37'; Lindström 75'

Colchester Community Stadium, Myland
Attendance: 901
Referee: Megan Wilson
23 November 2025
15:00 GMT

Leicester City	0–3	Crystal Palace
	Report	Howat 6'; Vanhaevermaet 36'; Blanchard 53'

Meadow Lane, Nottingham
Attendance: 519
Referee: Alice Parker

=== Group E ===
Pos	Team	Pld	W	PW	PL	L	GF	GA	GD	Pts	Qualification
1	Tottenham Hotspur	3	2	1	0	0	4	0	+4	8	Advanced to knockout stage
2	Aston Villa	3	1	0	2	0	6	3	+3	5	
3	Birmingham City	3	0	2	0	1	5	8	−3	4	
4	Bristol City	3	0	0	1	2	2	6	−4	1	

Source: Women's League Cup
Rules for classification: 1) Points; 2) Goal difference; 3) Number of goals scored; 4) Number of wins; 5) Head-to-head record
24 September 2025
19:00 BST

Birmingham City	2–2	Bristol City
Mannu 18'; Quinn 52' (pen.)	Report	Lloyd-Smith 54' (pen.); Hibbert-Johnson 79'
Penalties
Harrison-Murray (penalty scored); Baker (penalty scored); Sarri (penalty scored); Cooke (penalty scored)	4–3	(penalty missed) Sáez; (penalty scored) Lloyd-Smith; (penalty scored) Syme; (penalty scored) Jones; (penalty missed) Hibbert-Johnson

St Andrew's, Birmingham
Attendance: 458
Referee: Adewunmi Soneye
24 September 2025
19:00 BST

Tottenham Hotspur	0–0	Aston Villa
	Report
Penalties
Gunning-Williams (penalty missed); England (penalty scored); Nildén (penalty scored); Vinberg (penalty scored); Summanen (penalty scored); Spence (penalty scored); Kop (penalty scored); Koga (penalty scored)	7–6	(penalty scored) Mayling; (penalty scored) Patten; (penalty scored) Baijings; (penalty missed) Taylor; (penalty scored) Deslandes; (penalty scored) Wilms; (penalty scored) Kendall; (penalty missed) Mullett

Brisbane Road, Leyton
Attendance: 664
Referee: Phoebe Cross

19 October 2025
14:00 BST

Tottenham Hotspur	3–0	Birmingham City
Holdt 40', 74'; Nilden 53'	Report

Brisbane Road, Leyton
Attendance: 680
Referee: Ryan Atkin
19 October 2025
15:00 BST

Bristol City	0–3	Aston Villa
	Report	Daly 3'; Mullett 28'; Salmon 86' (pen.)

Robins HPC, Failand
Attendance: 654
Referee: Phoebe Cross

21 November 2025
19:00 GMT

Aston Villa	3–3	Birmingham City
Patten 64'; Kendall 77'; Maltby 90'	Report	Sarri 28', 58'; Louis 90+1'
Penalties
(penalty missed) Mayling; (penalty scored) Patten; (penalty scored) Kearns; (penalty missed) Kendall	2–4	(penalty scored) Harrison-Murray; (penalty scored) Harris; (penalty scored) Sarri; (penalty scored) Quinn

Bescot Stadium, Walsall
Attendance: 1,513
Referee: Sophie Dennington
23 November 2025
15:00 GMT

Bristol City	0–1	Tottenham Hotspur
	Report	Thomas 46'

Robins HPC, Failand
Attendance: 667
Referee: Amy Fearn

== Knockout stage ==
The draw for the quarter-finals and semi-finals took place on 25 November on the official WSL TikTok channel. It was conducted by GK Barry and Ella Rutherford.

The draw was highly criticised due to the conduct of Barry, who sang an anti-Tottenham call and response chant ("What do we think of Tottenham?", in which the respondent(s) reply "Shit!") and dropped a ball and reselected the ball. Tottenham raised concerns about the draw and received an apology from the WSL. Additionally a number of lewd jokes were made, deemed inappropriate for the audience demographic, along with a lack of knowledge of football displayed by Barry.

Quarter-finals
21 December
West Ham United	1
Manchester City	5
21 December
Liverpool	1
Chelsea	9
21 December
Crystal Palace	0
Arsenal	2
21 December
Manchester United	2
Tottenham Hotspur	1

Semi-finals
21 January
Manchester City	0
Chelsea	1
21 January
Arsenal	0
Manchester United	1

Final
15 March – Bristol
Chelsea	2
Manchester United	0

=== Quarter-finals ===
Arsenal, Chelsea and Manchester United entered the League Cup at the quarter-finals, having been exempt from the group stage due to their participation in the Champions League league phase. The draw for the quarter-final and semi-final took place on 25 November 2025.

21 December 2025
13:00 GMT

Liverpool	1–9	Chelsea
Clark 72'	Report	Kerr 13', 17'; Kaptein 21'; Beever-Jones 32'; Rytting Kaneryd 53', 73', 80'; Nüsken 76'; Bright 86'

BrewDog Stadium, St Helens
Attendance: 2,467
Referee: Grace Low

21 December 2025
13:00 GMT

Manchester United	2–1	Tottenham Hotspur
Park 51'; Rolfö 86'	Report	Spence 16'

Leigh Sports Village, Leigh
Attendance: 2,027
Referee: Phoebe Cross

21 December 2025
13:00 GMT

Crystal Palace	0–2	Arsenal
	Report	Codina 20'; Blackstenius 90+3'

Gander Green Lane, Sutton
Attendance: 3,040
Referee: Abigail Byrne

21 December 2025
13:00 GMT

West Ham United	1–5	Manchester City
Ueki 26'	Report	Kerolin 3'; Hemp 8'; Clinton 42'; Shaw 55'; Coombs 75'

Victoria Road, Dagenham
Attendance: 1,008
Referee: Adewunmi Soneye

=== Semi-finals ===
21 January 2026
19:00 GMT

Arsenal	0–1	Manchester United
	Report	Terland 45+2'

Meadow Park, Borehamwood
Attendance: 2,418
Referee: Stacey Fullicks

21 January 2026
19:00 GMT

Manchester City	0–1	Chelsea
	Report	Kaptein 41'

Academy Stadium, Manchester
Attendance: 1,967
Referee: Phoebe Cross

=== Final ===
On 19 December 2025, it was announced that the 2026 final would be held at Ashton Gate, the home of Bristol City. It was also confirmed that VAR and goal-line technology would be used for the third successive final.

15 March 2026
14:15 GMT

Chelsea	2–0	Manchester United
James 19'; Beever-Jones 76'	Report

Ashton Gate, Bristol
Attendance: 21,619
Referee: Grace Lowe
