= 2022 FA Women's League Cup final =

Eleventh edition of FA Women's League Cup Final

- Event: 2021–22 FA Women's League Cup
Chelsea	Manchester City
1	3
- Date: 5 March 2022
- Venue: Plough Lane, Wimbledon
- Player of the Match: Caroline Weir (Manchester City)
- Referee: Lisa Benn
- Attendance: 8,004

The 2022 FA Women's League Cup final was the 11th final of the FA Women's League Cup, England's secondary cup competition for women's football teams and its primary league cup tournament. It took place on 5 March 2022 at Plough Lane, and was contested by Chelsea and Manchester City.

Chelsea made their third appearance in a League Cup final and their third consecutive appearance, having won the previous two editions. Three-time winners Manchester City contested their fifth League Cup final and their first since winning it in 2019, the last team to do so before Chelsea's back-to-back wins. It was the first time the teams had met in a major cup final although they had previously met each other in three of the previous four League Cup knockout rounds at earlier stages.

== Route to the final ==
=== Chelsea ===
Round	Opposition	Score
GS	Bye	
QF	West Ham United (A)	4–2
SF	Manchester United (H)	3–1
Key: (H) = Home venue; (A) = Away venue.

In a change from previous years, teams competing in the UEFA Women's Champions League group stage were exempt from the League Cup group stage. Because Chelsea won the 2020–21 FA WSL title, they did not have to go through qualifying and were automatically entered into the Champions League group stage, subsequently giving them a bye to the knockout stage of the League Cup. As a result, Chelsea would only need to play two games to reach the final.

Entering at the quarter-final stage, Chelsea were drawn away to West Ham United for the opening game of their League Cup defence. West Ham had topped a group of Birmingham City, Brighton & Hove Albion and London City Lionesses, winning all three games without conceding. It was the first meeting of the season between the teams having had their league game in December postponed following a COVID-19 outbreak in the Chelsea squad. It was also the first game Chelsea had played after the winter break having had two league games postponed due to COVID outbreaks at both Chelsea and Everton. Pernille Harder gave Chelsea a 25th-minute lead when Jessie Fleming sprang Fran Kirby on the counter with West Ham committing players forward to attack a freekick. Having carried the ball from the halfway line, Kirby squared the ball to Harder who picked her spot past Anna Leat unchallenged. A wide open game, the teams went in at the break level when Kateřina Svitková received the ball on the left side of the box before cutting back inside on her right foot and shooting, catching a wrong-footed Ann-Katrin Berger off guard. Chelsea ramped up the intensity to begin the second half, retaking the lead from a 58th minute Erin Cuthbert header. Within eight minutes, West Ham had gone from level pegging to three goals down as Harder completed her hattrick, first by reacting quickest to the rebound as Leat parried a fizzing Kirby shot and then by cushioning a header back across goal and into the side netting. Not disheartened by the sudden deficit, West Ham battled back and scored a late goal by substitute Halle Houssein in her West Ham debut as Chelsea won 4–2. For the semi-final, Chelsea were drawn at home to Manchester United having handed them a bruising 6–1 WSL defeat in their only other previous meeting of the season. Chelsea won 3–1 with all four goals coming in a 13-minute flurry. Harder again opened the scoring, racing on to a long through ball as the United defence was caught napping. Fleming doubled the lead five minutes later reacting to a deflection to head the ball into the ground and looping over Sophie Baggaley. Some slick interplay between Jackie Groenen and Vilde Bøe Risa sliced open the Chelsea defence as the Norwegian halved the deficit just one minute later but the two goal cushion was restored shortly after when Jess Carter made a tearing near post run to cut in front of Aoife Mannion and turn the ball in. Chelsea held United at bay in the second half before Baggaley saw a straight red card in the 77th minute for clearing out an onrushing Sam Kerr 30 yards from goal. After the game United manager Marc Skinner lamented the suspensions of two key players, Ella Toone and Hayley Ladd, who were both missing for accumulating two yellow cards during their five-game run to the semi-finals while Chelsea had only previously played one game in the competition, suggesting the rules should be changed for future seasons.

=== Manchester City ===
Round	Opposition	Score
GS	Everton (H)	5–1
GS	Durham (H)	3–0
GS	Manchester United (A)	1–2
GS	Leicester City (A)	5–0
QF	Bristol City (H)	3–1
SF	Tottenham Hotspur (H)	3–0
Key: (H) = Home venue; (A) = Away venue.

In a change from previous years, teams competing in the UEFA Women's Champions League group stage were exempt from the League Cup group stage, earning a provisional bye to the quarter-finals. However, following their elimination during the second qualifying round at the hands of Real Madrid after the League Cup draw had been made, Manchester City were placed in the only remaining Northern region group with only four teams. It contained three WSL teams: Everton, Leicester City and Manchester United; as well as Championship side Durham. As a result of Manchester City no longer receiving a bye to the knockout stage, the best-placed runner up during the group stage would now also advance.

Despite a poor start to the WSL season, losing three of their opening five matches and sitting in 9th place, Manchester City opened their League Cup campaign with an emphatic 5–1 win over Everton who were struggling to gel following a heavy offseason of recruiting and investment. Caroline Weir had opened the scoring in the 8th minute and although Everton had equalised through Grace Clinton within a couple of minutes, Khadija Shaw had put City ahead before the halftime break. As Everton pressed forward in the second half in search of way back into the game, City capitalised as Lauren Hemp doubled City's leading before substitute Jess Park added a fourth and Ellen White saw her header fumbled into the goal by goalkeeper Courtney Brosnan in the final minute. The match was Willie Kirk's last game as Everton manager as he was sacked three days later. City once again struck early to open the scoring against Durham, this time through summer signing Filippa Angeldal in the 16th minute. The Championship side surrendered much of the possession to City who were denied a second goal with both Janine Beckie and Angeldal hitting the frame of the goal. Substitute Weir, on her 100th appearance for the club, finally managed to give City the cushion they were pushing for in the 87th minute, firing into the roof of the net from the edge of the Durham box. Beckie also got on the scoresheet in stoppage time as City ran out 3–0 winners. Having played out a thrilling 2–2 draw in the league the previous month, City traveled to Manchester United for the third group game. City's fast starts continue as Hayley Raso latched on to an early turnover, rolling the ball to Vicky Losada who fired the ball past Sophie Baggaley from the edge of the box with fewer than two minutes played. Despite controlling most of the opening exchanges, United managed to level on the half hour mark when goalkeeper Karima Benameur Taieb spilled the ball against her own body under pressure from Kirsty Hanson who knocked it back to Ivana Fuso to fire home from ten yards. With chances few and far between in a tighter second half, United broke the deadlock eight minutes from time when Ona Batlle broke down the wing to feed the ball to Alessia Russo in the box. The forward's shot was parried by Taieb and fell to Demi Stokes who was pickpocketed by Batlle before the Spaniard calmly stroked the ball into the net, sealing a 2–1 derby defeat for City. The final group game against Leicester City scheduled for 15 December 2021 was delayed due to a COVID-19 outbreak in the Manchester City squad. With all other games played, a victory over Everton had put United top of the group on nine points. City were three points behind with the delayed game still to play, although United were assured of a place in the knockout stage either as a group winner or as the best-placed runner up. City knew a win would send them top on goal difference while a win on penalties would send them through as the best second-placed team. However, opponents Leicester were also still alive as they could progress as runner-up if they won outright while a penalty shootout win for Leicester would see both teams miss out and instead send Group C runners-up Charlton Athletic through. The game was eventually played on 12 January 2022. Sitting bottom of the WSL, newly promoted Leicester had made a change of manager the previous month, bringing in Lydia Bedford who had guided the team to their first win of the season in the final game before the winter break. Despite the uptick in form, City blew a youthful Leicester side away as Bedford handed out five debuts including four academy players. For the third time in four group games, City led inside 10 minutes as Jess Park delivered a perfect cross for White to tap in. Hemp and Georgia Stanway both netted braces as City ran riot to punch their ticket to the knockout stage as group winner with a 5–0 win as teenage goalkeeper Khiara Keating kept a cleansheet on her senior debut.

Manchester City were drawn against Bristol City for the quarter-finals. Bristol had been beaten in last season's League Cup final and relegated in summer. At the time of their visit to the Academy Stadium, Bristol were 5th in the Championship as they struggled with consistency in their bid to return to the WSL at the first time of asking but had topped Group D including a 1–0 win over top-flight side Reading. Chelsea loanee Aggie Beever-Jones gave Bristol the early lead against the run of play, riding a Lucy Bronze challenge to drive into the City penalty area and pulling the ball back to force Alex Greenwood into a lunging block, turning the ball past Keating and into her own net. City's dominance was eventually rewarded through Shaw with the Jamaican twisting her way through the Bristol defence for the equaliser before latching on to the end of a Bronze cross to give City the lead a minute before halftime. A second half mix up between defender and goalkeeper gifted Losada a tap in as City kept control of the tie, seeing out a 3–1 win. For the semi-finals, City received another home tie, this time against surprise WSL top-three challengers Tottenham Hotspur. Having won three out of three including an 11–0 win against Watford during the group stage, Spurs had edged a 1–0 win over Championship leaders Liverpool to reach the semi-finals for the first time. City controlled the game from the start and tested Rebecca Spencer's goal early via Hemp and Shaw but were handed a warning when Jessica Naz dispossessed Keira Walsh to set up a one on one with the keeper only to drag it wide of the returning Ellie Roebuck's post. But for that chance, it was one-way traffic as Park eventually broke the deadlock with an enterprising dribble into the box capped by a deft far post finish before setting up Shaw for a tap in to double City's first-half lead. Bronze rattled the post from a corner before Hemp blazed over the rebound as City's refused to relent in the second half, finding a third goal in the 70th minute as Hemp rose highset to head home at the back post from Park's clipped cross and seal a comfortable 3–0 win.

== Match ==
=== Details ===
5 March 2022
17:15 GMT

Chelsea	1–3	Manchester City
Kerr 34'	Report	Weir 49', 69'; White 58'

Plough Lane, Wimbledon, London
Attendance: 8,004
Referee: Lisa Benn

Chelsea	Manchester City

GK	30	(Germany) Ann-Katrin Berger
CB	7	(England) Jessica Carter
CB	4	(England) Millie Bright (c)
CB	3	(Netherlands) Aniek Nouwen
RWB	21	(England) Niamh Charles	(substituted off) 68'
LWB	25	(Sweden) Jonna Andersson	(substituted off) 90'
CM	10	(South Korea) Ji So-yun	(substituted off) 79'
CM	5	(Wales) Sophie Ingle
CM	11	(Norway) Guro Reiten	(substituted off) 79'
CF	20	(Australia) Sam Kerr
CF	23	(Denmark) Pernille Harder
Substitutes:
GK	1	(Sweden) Zećira Mušović
FW	9	Bethany England	(substituted on) 79'
DF	16	(Sweden) Magdalena Eriksson
DF	18	(Norway) Maren Mjelde
FW	19	(England) Lauren James	(substituted on) 68'
MF	24	(Jamaica) Drew Spence	(substituted on) 79'
DF	27	(Russia) Alsu Abdullina	(substituted on) 90'
Manager:
(England) Emma Hayes

GK	26	(England) Ellie Roebuck
RB	20	(England) Lucy Bronze	(yellow card) 37'
CB	33	(Australia) Alanna Kennedy
CB	5	(England) Alex Greenwood
LB	3	(England) Demi Stokes
CM	19	(Scotland) Caroline Weir
CM	24	(England) Keira Walsh
CM	10	(England) Georgia Stanway
RW	13	(Australia) Hayley Raso		(substituted off) 82'
CF	18	(England) Ellen White (c)		(substituted off) 88'
LW	15	(England) Lauren Hemp
Substitutes:
GK	35	(England) Khiara Keating
MF	7	(England) Laura Coombs
FW	11	(Canada) Janine Beckie
MF	12	(Sweden) Filippa Angeldal
FW	16	(England) Jess Park
FW	21	(Jamaica) Khadija Shaw		(substituted on) 88'
MF	41	(Norway) Julie Blakstad		(substituted on) 82'
Manager:
(Wales) Gareth Taylor

Player of the match:
Caroline Weir (Manchester City)

Match officials

Assistant referees:
Mel Burgin
Lucy-Anne Briggs

Fourth official:
Emily Heaslip

Match rules

- 90 minutes.
- 30 minutes of extra-time if necessary.
- Penalty shoot-out if scores still level.
- Nine named substitutes.
- Maximum of five substitutions in three stoppages.
