= 2021–22 Chelsea F.C. Women season =

Chelsea
2021–22 season
- Chairman: Adrian Jacob
- Manager: Emma Hayes
- Stadium: Kingsmeadow
- FA WSL: 1st
- FA Cup: Winners
- League Cup: Runners-up
- Champions League: Group stage
- Top goalscorer: League: Sam Kerr (20); All: Sam Kerr (29)
- Highest home attendance: 4,378 (vs. Manchester United, 8 May 2022, FA WSL)
- Lowest home attendance: 1,270 (vs. Servette Chênois, 18 November 2021, UEFA Women's Champions League)
- Average home league attendance: 3,067
- Biggest win: 0–9 (vs. Leicester City (A), 27 March 2022, FA WSL)
- Biggest defeat: 0–4 (vs. VfL Wolfsburg (A), 16 December 2021, UEFA Women's Champions League)
Home colours	Away colours	Third colours

The 2021–22 season was Chelsea Women's 30th competitive season and 12th consecutive season in the FA Women's Super League, the top flight of English women's football. Chelsea competed in the domestic league as two-time defending champions since the 2019–20 season, and successfully managed to retain the title for the third time in a row, in addition to achieving a second consecutive double by also retaining the FA Cup.

== Squad information ==
=== First team squad ===
As of 29 January 2022

No.	Name	Nat	Since	Date of birth (age)	Signed from
Goalkeepers
1	Zećira Mušović	(Sweden)	2021	26 May 1996 (age 30)	(Sweden) Rosengård
30	Ann-Katrin Berger	(Germany)	2019	9 October 1990 (age 35)	(England) Birmingham City
Defenders
3	Aniek Nouwen	(Netherlands)	2021	9 March 1999 (age 27)	(Netherlands) PSV
4	Millie Bright	(England)	2014	21 August 1993 (age 33)	(England) Doncaster Rovers Belles
7	Jessica Carter	(England)	2018	27 October 1997 (age 28)	(England) Birmingham City
16	Magdalena Eriksson (captain)	(Sweden)	2017	8 September 1993 (age 33)	(Sweden) Linköpings
18	Maren Mjelde	(Norway)	2016	6 November 1989 (age 36)	(Norway) Avaldsnes IL
21	Niamh Charles	(England)	2020	21 June 1999 (age 27)	(England) Liverpool
25	Jonna Andersson	(Sweden)	2017	2 January 1993 (age 33)	(Sweden) Linköpings
27	Alsu Abdullina	(Russia)	2021	11 April 2001 (age 25)	(Russia) Lokomotiv Moscow
Midfielders
5	Sophie Ingle	(Wales)	2018	2 September 1991 (age 35)	(England) Liverpool
8	Melanie Leupolz	(Germany)	2020	14 April 1994 (age 32)	(Germany) Bayern Munich
10	Ji So-yun	(South Korea)	2014	21 February 1991 (age 35)	(Japan) INAC Kobe Leonessa
14	Fran Kirby	(England)	2015	29 June 1993 (age 33)	(England) Reading
17	Jessie Fleming	(Canada)	2020	11 March 1998 (age 28)	(United States) UCLA Bruins
24	Drew Spence	(England)	2008	23 October 1992 (age 33)	Homegrown
Forwards
9	Beth England	(England)	2016	3 June 1994 (age 32)	(England) Doncaster Rovers Belles
11	Guro Reiten	(Norway)	2019	26 July 1994 (age 32)	(Norway) LSK Kvinner
19	Lauren James	(England)	2021	29 September 2001 (age 25)	(England) Manchester United
20	Sam Kerr	(Australia)	2019	10 September 1993 (age 33)	(United States) Chicago Red Stars
22	Erin Cuthbert	(Scotland)	2016	19 July 1998 (age 28)	(Scotland) Glasgow City
23	Pernille Harder	(Denmark)	2020	15 November 1992 (age 33)	(Germany) Wolfsburg
Out on loan
32	Emily Orman	(England)	2019	5 November 2002 (age 23)	Homegrown
33	Agnes Beever-Jones	(England)	2021	27 July 2003 (age 23)	Homegrown
34	Charlotte Wardlaw	(England)	2019	20 February 2003 (age 23)	Homegrown
29	Jorja Fox	(England)	2021	28 August 2003 (age 23)	Homegrown

=== Academy players with first-team appearances ===
No.	Name	Nat	Since	Date of birth (age)	Signed from
31	Aimee Claypole	(England)	2022	8 November 2005 (age 20)	Academy
35	Emma Thompson	(England)	2022	21 February 2004 (age 22)	Academy

== New contracts ==
No.	Pos	Player/Manager	Date	Contract end	Source
–	–	(England) Emma Hayes	2 July 2021	N/A	
7	DF	(England) Jessica Carter	9 June 2021	2022	
30	GK	(Germany) Ann-Katrin Berger	28 July 2021	2024	
20	FW	(Australia) Sam Kerr	16 November 2021	2024	

== Transfers and loans ==
=== In ===
Pos	Player	Transferred From	Fee	Date	Source
DF	(Netherlands) Aniek Nouwen	(Netherlands) PSV	Undisclosed	12 May 2021	
GK	(England) Emily Orman	(England) Chelsea Academy	Free	28 June 2021	
MF	(England) Charlotte Wardlaw	(England) Chelsea Academy	Free	30 June 2021	
FW	(England) Lauren James	(England) Manchester United	£200,000	23 July 2021	
DF	(Russia) Alsu Abdullina	(Russia) Lokomotiv Moscow	Undisclosed	22 December 2021	

=== Out ===
Pos	Player	Transferred To	Fee	Date	Source
MF	(Scotland) Jamie-Lee Napier	(England) London City Lionesses	Undisclosed	9 June 2021	
FW	(England) Emily Murphy	(United States) North Carolina Tar Heels	Undisclosed	20 July 2021	
DF	(England) Hannah Blundell	(England) Manchester United	Free	23 July 2021	
GK	(England) Carly Telford	(United States) San Diego Wave FC	Undisclosed	24 January 2022	

=== Loan out ===
No.	Pos	Player	To	Date	Until	Fee	Source
33	FW	(England) Agnes Beever-Jones	(England) Bristol City	19 August 2021	30 June 2022	Free	
32	GK	(England) Emily Orman	(England) Crystal Palace	20 August 2021	30 June 2022	Free	
34	MF	(England) Charlotte Wardlaw	(England) Liverpool	20 August 2021	30 June 2022	Free	
29	MF	(England) Jorja Fox	(England) Charlton Athletic	6 January 2022	30 June 2022	Free	

== Management team ==
Position	Staff
Manager	(England) Emma Hayes
Assistant manager	(England) Paul Green
Assistant coach	(United States) Denise Reddy
Head of technical/Goalkeeping coach	(England) Stuart Searle
Head of performance	(Belgium) Bart Caubergh
Opposition analyst & coach	(England) Leanne Champ

Source: Chelsea F.C.

== Kit ==
Home	Home alt.	Away	Away alt.	Third	Goalkeeper 1

== Pre-season ==
1 August 2021 Friendly	Arsenal	2–1	Chelsea	London, England
12:15 BST	McCabe 28'; Jupp 82'	Report	Blades 80'	Stadium: Emirates Stadium; Attendance: N/A; Referee: unk.

12 August 2021 Friendly	Rangers (Scotland)	1–4	(England) Chelsea	Milngavie, Scotland
19:30 BST	Hay 17'	Report	Harder 18', 28' (pen.); England 71'; Thompson 81'	Stadium: Rangers Training Centre; Attendance: N/A; Referee: unk.

27 August 2021 Friendly	Chelsea	1–0	Aston Villa	Kingston upon Thames, England
18:00 BST	England 23'	Report		Stadium: Kingsmeadow; Attendance: N/A; Referee: unk.

== Competitions ==
=== Women's Super League ===
==== League table ====
Pos	Team	Pld	W	D	L	GF	GA	GD	Pts	Qualification or relegation
1	Chelsea (C)	22	18	2	2	62	11	+51	56	Qualification for the Champions League group stage
2	Arsenal	22	17	4	1	65	10	+55	55	Qualification for the Champions League second round
3	Manchester City	22	15	2	5	60	22	+38	47	Qualification for the Champions League first round
4	Manchester United	22	12	6	4	45	22	+23	42	
5	Tottenham Hotspur	22	9	5	8	24	23	+1	32	

Source: FA WSL
Rules for classification: 1) Points; 2) Goal difference; 3) Number of goals scored.
(C) Champions

==== Results summary ====
Overall								Home						Away					
Pld	W	D	L	GF	GA	GD	Pts	W	D	L	GF	GA	GD	W	D	L	GF	GA	GD
22	18	2	2	62	11	+51	56	10	1	0	29	4	+25	8	1	2	33	7	+26

Last updated: 8 May 2022.
Source: FA WSL

==== Results by matchday ====
Matchday	1	2	3	4	5	6	7	8	9	10	11	12	13	14	15	16	17	18	19	20	21	22
Result	L	W	W	W	W	W	W	W	L	D	W	W	D	W	W	W	W	W	W	W	W	W
Position	7	6	4	3	2	2	2	2	2	2	2	2	2	2	2	2	1	1	1	1	1	1

Updated to match(es) played on 8 May 2022. Source: FA WSL
W = Win; D = Draw; L = Loss

==== Matches ====
5 September 2021 1	Arsenal	3–2	Chelsea	Highbury
12:30 BST	Miedema 14'; McCabe (yellow card) 23'; Mead 49', 60'; Parris (yellow card) 85'	Report	Cuthbert 44'; Harder 64'; Eriksson (yellow card) 66'	Stadium: Emirates Stadium; Attendance: 8,705; Referee: Rebecca Welch

12 September 2021 2	Chelsea	4–0	Everton	Kingston upon Thames
12:30 BST	Kirby 25'; Kerr 47', 74'; Ingle (yellow card) 75'; England 79'	Report		Stadium: Kingsmeadow; Attendance: 2,379; Referee: Amy Fearn

26 September 2021 3	Manchester United	1–6	Chelsea	Leigh
12:30 BST	Russo 48'	report	Kirby 2'; Harder 24'; Kerr 41', 51'; Spence 87'; Fleming 90+2'	Stadium: Leigh Sports Village; Attendance: 2,197; Referee: Kirsty Dowle

2 October 2021 4	Chelsea	3–1	Brighton & Hove Albion	Kingston upon Thames
11:30 BST	Reiten 9' (yellow card) 57'; Bright (yellow card) 27'; Kerr 38'; England 80'	Report	Carter 48'; Kaagman (yellow card) 65'	Stadium: Kingsmeadow; Attendance: 2,480; Referee: Amy Fearn

10 October 2021 5	Chelsea	2–0	Leicester City	Kingston upon Thames
12:30 BST	Harder 83'; Kirby 90+4'	Report	Purfield (yellow card) 31'	Stadium: Kingsmeadow; Attendance: 2,716; Referee: Lisa Benn

7 November 2021 6	Aston Villa	0–1	Chelsea	Walsall
12:30 GMT (UTC+00:00)	Allen (yellow card) 56'	Report	Fleming 22'; Ingle (yellow card) 28'; Andersson (yellow card) 90+1'	Stadium: Bescot Stadium; Attendance: 715; Referee: Abigail Byrne

14 November 2021 7	Manchester City	0–4	Chelsea	Manchester
15:00 GMT (UTC+00:00)	Greenwood (yellow card) 74'	Report	Fleming 2'; Kerr 45+4'; Kirby 52'; Eriksson 55'	Stadium: Academy Stadium; Attendance: 3,174; Referee: Rebecca Welch

21 November 2021 8	Chelsea	5–0	Birmingham City	Kingston upon Thames
14:00 GMT (UTC+00:00)	Kirby 4', 75'; Kerr 18', 29', 44'; Bright (yellow card) 84'	Report	Lawley (yellow card) 63'	Stadium: Kingsmeadow; Attendance: 2,704; Referee: Elizabeth Simms

12 December 2021 9	Reading	1–0	Chelsea	Reading
11:30 GMT (UTC+00:00)	Rose 4'; Eikeland (yellow card) 28'	Report		Stadium: Madejski Stadium; Attendance: 742; Referee: Louise Saunders

23 January 2022 10	Brighton & Hove Albion	0–0	Chelsea	Crawley
12:30 GMT (UTC+00:00)		Report	Harder (yellow card) 33'	Stadium: Broadfield Stadium; Attendance: 1,743; Referee: Kirsty Dowle

26 January 2022 11	Chelsea	2–0	West Ham United	Kingston upon Thames
19:00 GMT (UTC+00:00)	England 51'; Cuthbert 82'	Report	Parker (yellow card) 17'; Cissoko (yellow card) 20'	Stadium: Kingsmeadow; Attendance: 2,554; Referee: Ryan Atkin

6 February 2022 12	Chelsea	1–0	Manchester City	Kingston upon Thames
15:00 GMT (UTC+00:00)	Reiten 51'	Report		Stadium: Kingsmeadow; Attendance: 3,321; Referee: Amy Fearn

13 February 2022 13	Chelsea	0–0	Arsenal	Kingston upon Thames
15:00 GMT (UTC+00:00)	Reiten (yellow card) 51'	Report	Maritz (yellow card) 43'; Walti (yellow card) 53'	Stadium: Kingsmeadow; Attendance: 3,330; Referee: Rebecca Welch

6 March 2022 14	West Ham United	1–4	Chelsea	Dagenham
15:00 GMT (UTC+00:00)	Brynjarsdottir 48'	Report	Harder 20', 32'; Charles 23'; Kerr 62'	Stadium: Victoria Road; Attendance: 1,735; Referee: Carl Brook

13 March 2022 15	Chelsea	1–0	Aston Villa	Kingston upon Thames
15:00 GMT (UTC+00:00)	Kerr 90+2' (yellow card) 90+2'	Report		Stadium: Kingsmeadow; Attendance: 2,655; Referee: Abigail Byrne

16 March 2022 16	Everton	0–3	Chelsea	Liverpool
19:00 BST		Report	Kerr 7'; Reiten 15'; Cuthbert 29'	Stadium: Walton Hall Park; Attendance: 487; Referee: James Bell

27 March 2022 17	Leicester City	0–9	Chelsea	Leicester
15:00 BST		Report	Reiten 3', 45+5'; Kerr 5', 47'; England 7', 28'; Nouwen 11'; James 88'; Fleming 90'	Stadium: King Power Stadium; Attendance: 2,278; Referee: Abigail Byrne

3 April 2022 18	Chelsea	5–0	Reading	Kingston upon Thames
15:00 BST	Fleming 40'; England 52', 90+2'; Kerr 66', 77'	Report		Stadium: Kingsmeadow; Attendance: 2,485; Referee: Emily Heaslip

24 April 2022 19	Tottenham Hotspur	1–3	Chelsea	Canons Park
15:00 BST	Ingle 15' (o.g.); Zadorsky (yellow card) 71'; Williams (yellow card) 75'	Report	Reiten 27'; Berger (red card) 33'; Kerr 71'; Bright (yellow card) 45+3'; Carter (yellow card) 90+3'; Fleming 90+5'	Stadium: The Hive Stadium; Attendance: 2,161; Referee: Lisa Benn

28 April 2022 20	Chelsea	2–1	Tottenham Hotspur	Kingston upon Thames
13:45 BST	England 19'; Kerr 45+1'	Report	Harrop 44'; Ayane (yellow card) 87'; Bartrip (yellow card) 88'	Stadium: Kingsmeadow; Attendance: 3,660; Referee: Jack Packman

1 May 2022 21	Birmingham City	0–1	Chelsea	Birmingham
15:00 BST	Cowie (yellow card) 35'; Robertson (yellow card) 43'; Scott (yellow card) 90+5'	Report	Harder 71' (pen.); Berger (yellow card) 90+4'	Stadium: St Andrew's; Attendance: 1,429; Referee: Emily Heaslip

8 May 2022 22	Chelsea	4-2	Manchester United	Kingston upon Thames
15:00 BST	Cuthbert 18'; Kerr 46', 66'; Reiten 51'	Report	Thomas 13'; Toone 25'	Stadium: Kingsmeadow; Attendance: 4,378; Referee: Abigail Byrne

=== FA Cup ===
29 January 2022 Fourth round proper	Aston Villa	1–3	Chelsea	Walsall
13:00 GMT	Petzelberger 90+5' (pen.)	Report	Reiten 18', 62'; Harder 28' (pen.)	Stadium: Bescot Stadium; Attendance: 1,093; Referee: Abigail Bryne

26 February 2022 Fifth round proper	Chelsea	7–0	Leicester City	Kingston upon Thames
13:00 GMT	Bright (yellow card) 13'; Harder 24', 36'; Kerr 60', 82'; Ji 65'; Nouwen 79'; England 85'	Report	Howard (red card) 17'	Stadium: Kingsmeadow; Attendance: 2,723; Referee: Emily Heaslip

20 March 2022 Quarter-final	Chelsea	5–0	Birmingham City	Kingston upon Thames
12:00 GMT	Eriksson 44'; Spence 54'; England 62', 72'; Charles 66'	Report	Quinn (yellow card) 44'	Stadium: Kingsmeadow; Attendance: 1,869; Referee: Lauren Impey

17 April 2022 Semi-final	Arsenal	0–2	Chelsea	Borehamwood
12:30 BST	Mead (yellow card) 48'	Report	Quinn (yellow card) 44'; Reiten 50'; Ji 61'	Stadium: Meadow Park; Attendance: 3,458; Referee: Rebecca Welch

15 May 2022 Final	Manchester City	2–3 (a.e.t.)	Chelsea	Wembley
14:30 BST	Hemp 42'; Raso 89'	Report	Kerr 33', 99'; Cuthbert 63'	Stadium: Wembley; Attendance: 49,094; Referee: Kirsty Dowle

=== League Cup ===
==== Knockout phase ====
19 January 2022 Quarter-final	West Ham United	2–4	Chelsea	Dagenham
19:30	Svitková 34'; Houssein 83'	Report	Harder 25', 61', 66' (yellow card) 82'; Cuthbert 58'	Stadium: Victoria Road; Attendance: 615; Referee: Paul Howard

2 February 2022 Semi-final	Chelsea	3–1	Manchester United	Kingston upon Thames
19:00	Harder 26'; Fleming 31'; Carter 39'; Charles (yellow card) 87'	Report	Bøe Risa 32'; Baggaley (red card) 77'	Stadium: Kingsmeadow; Attendance: 1,548; Referee: Paul Howard

5 March 2022 Final	Chelsea	1–3	Manchester City	Wimbledon
17:15	Kerr 34'	Report	Bronze (yellow card) 38'; Weir 49', 69'; White 58'	Stadium: The Cherry Red Records Stadium; Attendance: 8,004; Referee: Lisa Benn

=== UEFA Women's Champions League ===
==== Group stage ====
Pos	Team	Pld	W	D	L	GF	GA	GD	Pts	Qualification	WOL	JUV	CHE	SER
1	(Germany) VfL Wolfsburg	6	3	2	1	17	7	+10	11 (Note: Head-to-head points: Wolfsburg 5, Juventus 5, Chelsea 5. Head-to-head goal differences: Wolfsburg +2, Juventus +1, Chelsea −3.)	Advance to Quarter-finals	—	0–2	4–0	5–0
2	(Italy) Juventus	6	3	2	1	12	4	+8	11	Advance to Quarter-finals	2–2	—	1–2	4–0
3	(England) Chelsea	6	3	2	1	13	8	+5	11		3–3	0–0	—	1–0
4	(Switzerland) Servette Chênois	6	0	0	6	0	23	−23	0		0–3	0–3	0–7	—

Source: UEFA
Rules for classification: Group stage tiebreakers
Notes:

6 October 2021 1	Chelsea (England)	3–3	(Germany) VfL Wolfsburg	London, England
20:00 BT	Kerr 12'; England 51'; Harder 90+2'	Report	Waßmuth (yellow card) 9' (goal) 18', 48'; Roord 34' (yellow card) 38'; Oberdorf (yellow card) 79'	Stadium: Kingsmeadow; Attendance: 1,371; Referee: Lina Lehtovaara (Finland)

13 October 2021 2	Juventus (Italy)	1–2	(England) Chelsea	Turin, Italy
21:00 CET	Bonansea 37'	Report	Cuthbert 31'; Harder 69'	Stadium: Juventus Stadium; Attendance: 16,761; Referee: Ivana Martincic (Croatia)

9 November 2021 3	Servette Chênois (Switzerland)	0–7	(England) Chelsea	Geneva, Switzerland
18:45 CET		Report	Leupolz 8'; Kirby 16', 26'; Kerr 18', 20'; Fleming 38'; Reiten 50'	Stadium: Stade de Genève; Attendance: 12,782; Referee: Iuliana Demetrescu (Romania)

18 November 2021 4	Chelsea (England)	1–0	(Switzerland) Servette Chênois	London, England
20:00 BT	Kerr 67'	Report	Soulard (yellow card) 71' (yellow-red card) 82'	Stadium: Kingsmeadow; Attendance: 1,270; Referee: Hristiyana Guteva (Bulgaria)

8 December 2021 5	Chelsea (England)	0–0	(Italy) Juventus	London, England
20:00 GMT	Kerr (yellow card) 88'; Berger (yellow card) 90+1'	Report	Peyraud-Magnin (yellow card) 87'; Bonansea (yellow card) 90+1'	Stadium: Kingsmeadow; Attendance: 1,808; Referee: Sara Persson (Sweden)

16 December 2021 6	VfL Wolfsburg (Germany)	4–0	(England) Chelsea	Wolfsburg, Germany
21:00 CET	Huth 16', 23'; Waßmuth 60', 78'; Oberdorf (yellow card) 90+2'	Report	Harder (yellow card) 65'; Leupolz (yellow card) 90+1'	Stadium: AOK Stadion; Attendance: 1,107; Referee: Kateryna Monzul (Ukraine)

== Statistics ==
=== Appearances and goals ===
As of 15 May 2022

No.	Pos	Nat	Player	Total		FA WSL		FA Cup		League Cup		Champions League	
No.	Pos	Nat	Player	Apps	Goals	Apps	Goals	Apps	Goals	Apps	Goals	Apps	Goals
Goalkeepers:
1	GK	(Sweden) SWE	Zećira Mušović	15	0	8+2	0	1	0	1	0	3	0
30	GK	(Germany) GER	Ann-Katrin Berger	22	0	14	0	3	0	2	0	3	0
Defenders:
3	DF	(Netherlands) NED	Aniek Nouwen	22	2	12+2	1	4	1	3	0	0+1	0
4	DF	(England) ENG	Millie Bright	35	0	22	0	4	0	3	0	6	0
7	DF	(England) ENG	Jessica Carter	33	1	19+2	0	4	0	3	1	5	0
16	DF	(Sweden) SWE	Magdalena Eriksson	24	1	13+3	0	2	1	0	0	6	0
18	DF	(Norway) NOR	Maren Mjelde	8	0	0+4	0	0+2	0	0	0	1+1	0
21	DF	(England) ENG	Niamh Charles	32	2	12+8	1	3+2	1	3	0	1+3	0
25	DF	(Sweden) SWE	Jonna Andersson	30	0	11+9	0	3+1	0	3	0	1+2	0
27	DF	(Russia) RUS	Alsu Abdullina	11	0	0+5	0	1+2	0	0+3	0	0	0
Midfielders:
5	MF	(Wales) WAL	Sophie Ingle	30	0	15+3	0	3+1	0	3	0	4+1	0
8	MF	(Germany) GER	Melanie Leupolz	13	1	6+1	0	0	0	0	0	4+2	1
10	MF	(South Korea) KOR	Ji So-yun	22	2	8+4	0	3+1	2	1	0	4+1	0
14	FW	(England) ENG	Fran Kirby	22	8	9+4	6	2	0	1	0	5+1	2
17	MF	(Canada) CAN	Jessie Fleming	32	8	11+10	6	2+2	0	2	1	1+4	1
24	MF	(England) ENG	Drew Spence	23	2	5+11	1	2+1	1	0+3	0	1	0
Forwards:
9	FW	(England) ENG	Beth England	30	12	11+9	8	2+1	3	0+2	0	2+3	1
11	MF	(Norway) NOR	Guro Reiten	35	10	18+4	6	4	3	2+1	0	5+1	1
19	FW	(England) ENG	Lauren James	12	1	0+6	1	1+2	0	0+2	0	0+1	0
20	FW	(Australia) AUS	Sam Kerr	32	29	18+3	20	3	4	1+1	1	6	4
22	MF	(Scotland) SCO	Erin Cuthbert	31	5	17+4	2	2	1	2	1	5+1	1
23	FW	(Denmark) DEN	Pernille Harder	27	14	13+3	5	3+1	3	3	4	4	2
31	FW	(England) ENG	Aimee Claypole	1	0	0	0	0+1	0	0	0	0	0
35	FW	(England) ENG	Emma Thompson	1	0	0	0	0+1	0	0	0	0	0
Players have left the club:
28	GK	(England) ENG	Carly Telford	0	0	0	0	0	0	0	0	0	0
29	DF	(England) ENG	Jorja Fox	2	0	0+1	0	0	0	0	0	0+1	0
32	GK	(England) ENG	Emily Orman	0	0	0	0	0	0	0	0	0	0
33	FW	(England) ENG	Agnes Beever-Jones	0	0	0	0	0	0	0	0	0	0
34	MF	(England) ENG	Charlotte Wardlaw	0	0	0	0	0	0	0	0	0	0

- Source: Chelsea F.C.

=== Goalscorers ===
Includes all competitive matches. The list is sorted by squad number when total goals are equal.

As of 15 May 2022

Rank	Pos.	No.	Player	FA WSL	FA Cup	League Cup	Champions League	Total
1	FW	20	(Australia) Sam Kerr	20	4	1	4	29
2	FW	23	(Denmark) Pernille Harder	6	3	4	2	15
3	FW	9	Bethany England	8	3	0	1	12
4	MF	11	(Norway) Guro Reiten	7	3	0	1	11
5	FW	14	(England) Fran Kirby	6	0	0	2	8
5	MF	17	(Canada) Jessie Fleming	6	0	1	1	8
7	MF	22	(Scotland) Erin Cuthbert	4	1	1	1	7
8	MF	10	(South Korea) Ji So-yun	0	2	0	0	2
8	DF	3	(Netherlands) Aniek Nouwen	1	1	0	0	2
8	DF	16	(Sweden) Magdalena Eriksson	1	1	0	0	2
8	DF	21	(England) Niamh Charles	1	1	0	0	2
8	MF	24	(Jamaica) Drew Spence	1	1	0	0	2
12	DF	7	(England) Jess Carter	0	0	1	0	1
12	MF	8	(Germany) Melanie Leupolz	0	0	0	1	1
12	FW	19	(England) Lauren James	1	0	0	0	1
Total				62	17	8	13	103

=== Assists ===
Includes all competitive matches. The list is sorted by squad number when total assists are equal.

As of 15 May 2022

Rank	Pos.	No.	Player	FA WSL	FA Cup	League Cup	Champions League	Total
1	FW	14	(England) Fran Kirby	6	1	1	3	11
2	FW	20	(Australia) Sam Kerr	4	2	0	2	8
3	FW	9	Beth England	4	3	0	0	7
3	MF	11	(Norway) Guro Reiten	5	0	2	0	7
3	FW	23	(Denmark) Pernille Harder	3	3	0	0	7
6	MF	10	(South Korea) Ji So-yun	5	0	0	1	6
6	MF	17	(Canada) Jessie Fleming	4	1	0	1	6
9	DF	25	(Sweden) Jonna Andersson	3	0	2	0	5
10	MF	22	(Scotland) Erin Cuthbert	4	0	0	0	4
11	MF	8	(Germany) Melanie Leupolz	1	0	0	2	3
12	DF	4	(England) Millie Bright	0	1	0	1	2
12	MF	5	(Wales) Sophie Ingle	1	1	0	0	2
12	DF	7	(England) Jess Carter	1	1	0	0	2
12	DF	21	(England) Niamh Charles	1	1	0	0	2
12	MF	24	(Jamaica) Drew Spence	1	1	0	0	2
16	GK	1	(Sweden) Zećira Mušović	1	0	0	0	1
16	DF	27	(Russia) Alsu Abdullina	0	1	0	0	1
Total				42	16	5	10	73

=== Clean sheets ===
Includes all competitive matches. The list is sorted by squad number when total clean sheets are equal.

As of 15 May 2022

Rank	Pos.	No.	Player	FA WSL	FA Cup	League Cup	Champions League	Total
1	GK	30	(Germany) Ann-Katrin Berger	9	3	0	1	14
2	GK	1	(Sweden) Zećira Mušović	7	0	0	2	9

=== Disciplinary records ===
Includes all competitive matches. The list is sorted by squad number when total disciplinary records are equal.

As of 15 May 2022

Pos.	No.	Name	FA WSL		FA Cup		League Cup		Champions League		Total	
Pos.	No.	Name	Booked	Sent off (straight red)	Booked	Sent off (straight red)	Booked	Sent off (straight red)	Booked	Sent off (straight red)	Booked	Sent off (straight red)
GK	30	(Germany) Ann-Katrin Berger	1	1	0	0	0	0	1	0	2	1
DF	4	(England) Millie Bright	3	0	1	0	0	0	0	0	4	0
FW	23	(Denmark) Pernille Harder	1	0	0	0	1	0	1	0	3	0
MF	5	(Wales) Sophie Ingle	2	0	0	0	0	0	0	0	2	0
DF	7	(England) Jess Carter	1	0	1	0	0	0	0	0	2	0
MF	11	(Norway) Guro Reiten	2	0	0	0	0	0	0	0	2	0
FW	20	(Australia) Sam Kerr	1	0	0	0	0	0	1	0	2	0
MF	8	(Germany) Melanie Leupolz	0	0	0	0	0	0	1	0	1	0
DF	16	(Sweden) Magdalena Eriksson	1	0	0	0	0	0	0	0	1	0
MF	17	(Canada) Jessie Fleming	1	0	0	0	0	0	0	0	1	0
DF	21	(England) Niamh Charles	0	0	0	0	1	0	0	0	1	0
MF	22	(Scotland) Erin Cuthbert	0	0	1	0	0	0	0	0	1	0
MF	24	(Jamaica) Drew Spence	0	0	1	0	0	0	0	0	1	0
DF	25	(Sweden) Jonna Andersson	1	0	0	0	0	0	0	0	1	0

== Awards ==
Player	Position	Award	Ref.
(Denmark) Pernille Harder	Forward	FA Women's Super League Goal of the Month (September 2021)	
(England) Fran Kirby	Forward	PFA WSL Player of the Month (September 2021)	
(Canada) Jessie Fleming	Midfielder	FA Women's Super League Player of the Month (November 2021)	
(England) Chelsea Football Club	Club	Ballon D'or Club of the Year (2021)	
(England) Emma Hayes	Manager	WICC Women's Best XI (2021)	
(England) Emma Hayes	Manager	The Best FIFA Women's Coach (2021)	
(England) Emma Hayes	Manager	London Football Awards Outstanding Contribution to London Football (2022)	
(England) Emma Hayes	Manager	FA Women's Super League Manager of the Month (March 2022)	
(England) Emma Hayes	Manager	FA Women's Super League Manager of the Season	
(England) Millie Bright	Defender	FIFA FIFPro Women's World 11 (2021)	
(England) Millie Bright	Defender	PFA Team of the Year	
(Sweden) Magdalena Eriksson	Defender	FIFA FIFPro Women's World 11 (2021)	
(Australia) Sam Kerr	Forward	London Football Awards WSL Player of the Year (2022)	
(Australia) Sam Kerr	Forward	Football Writer's Association Women's Footballer of the Year	
(Australia) Sam Kerr	Forward	FA Women's Super League Player of the Month (April 2022)	
(Australia) Sam Kerr	Forward	FA Women's Super League Golden Boot	
(Australia) Sam Kerr	Forward	PFA WSL Player of the Month (April 2022)	
(Australia) Sam Kerr	Forward	FA Women's Super League Goal of the Season	
(Australia) Sam Kerr	Forward	FA Women's Super League Player of the Season	
(Australia) Sam Kerr	Forward	PFA Team of the Year	
(Australia) Sam Kerr	Forward	PFA Women's Players' Player of the Year	
(Germany) Ann-Katrin Berger	Goalkeeper	PFA Team of the Year	
(Norway) Guro Reiten	Midfielder	PFA Team of the Year	
