= Zećira Mušović =

Swedish footballer (born 1996)

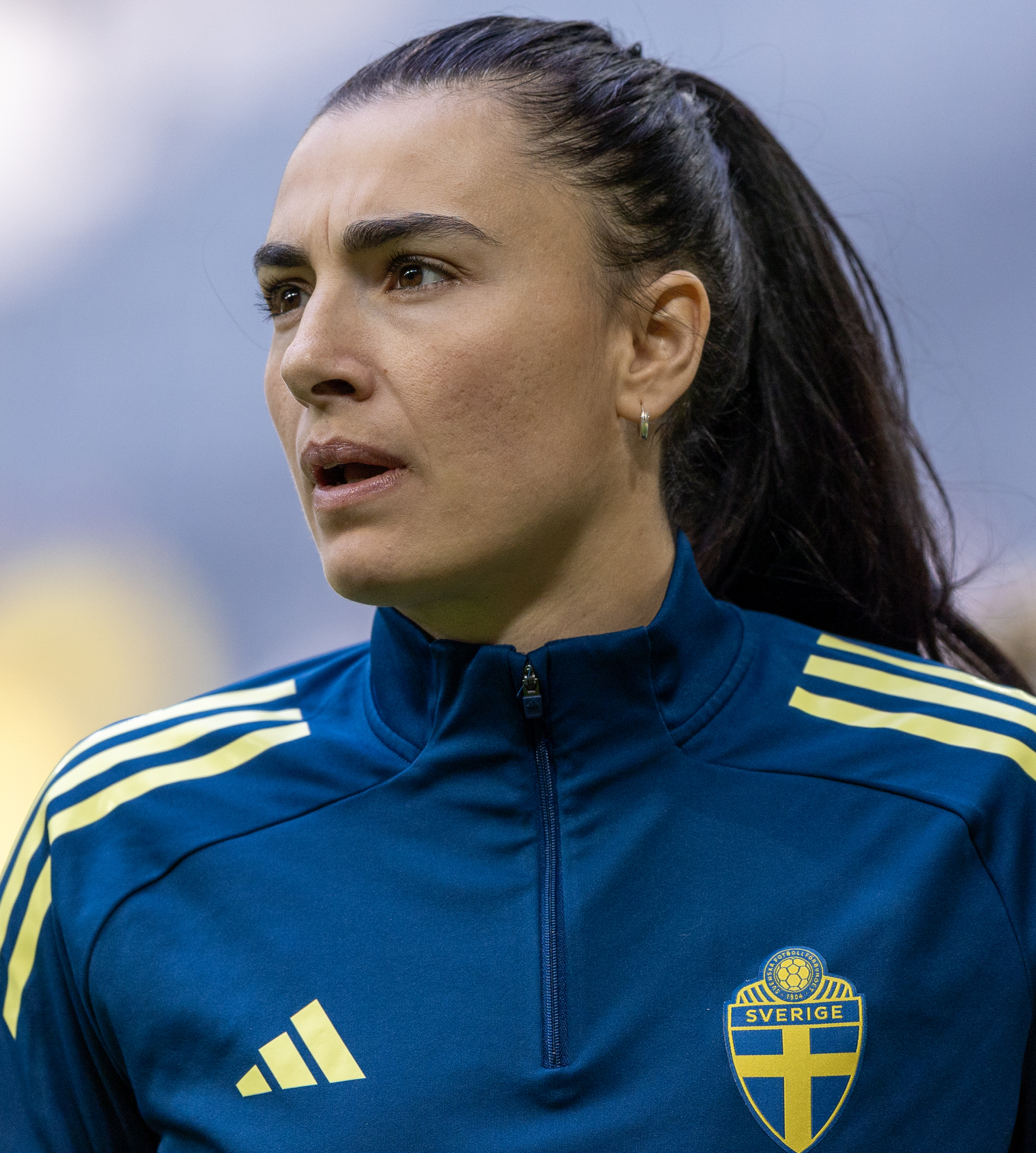
- Mušović with Sweden in 2026

Personal information
- Full name: Zećira Mušović
- Date of birth: 26 May 1996 (age 30)
- Place of birth: Falun, Sweden
- Height: 1.80 m (5 ft 11 in)
- Position: Goalkeeper

Team information
- Current team: Malmö FF
- Number: 1

Youth career
- 2005–2011: Stattena IF

Senior career*
Years	Team	Apps	(Gls)
2011–2012	Stattena IF	29	(0)
2012–2020	FC Rosengård	108	(0)
2021–2025	Chelsea	26	(0)
2025–	Malmö FF	21	(0)

International career^{‡}
2012	Sweden U17	5	(0)
2013–2016	Sweden U19	26	(0)
2016–2018	Sweden U23	4	(0)
2018–	Sweden	28	(0)
Medal record
Women's football
Representing Sweden
Olympic Games
Silver medal – second place	2020 Tokyo	Team
FIFA Women's World Cup
Third place	2019 France
Third place	2023 Australia/New Zealand
- * Club domestic league appearances and goals as of 2 May 2026 ‡ National team caps and goals as of 13 October 2026

Zećira Mušović (Bosnian: [zetɕira muʃovitɕ]; born 26 May 1996) is a Swedish professional footballer who plays as a goalkeeper for Damallsvenskan club Malmö FF and the Sweden national team.

== Early life ==
Mušović was born in Falun, Sweden in 1996 to a family of Bosniak origin. Her family had previously lived in the town of Prijepolje in Yugoslavia, modern-day Serbia. In 1992, her parents and three older siblings fled to Sweden to escape the Yugoslav Wars. They settled in the province of Scania, where Mušović joined the youth system of Stattena IF, a football club in the city of Helsingborg. Zećira has said she misses Prijepolje, and often visits Bosnia and Herzegovina: "I miss Prijepolje. I have many relatives there. Prijepolje is a very beautiful city and I have a lot of love for it. I also have a lot of relatives in Bosnia and every year I try to visit my favorite city, Sarajevo."

She has an older brother and two older sisters. She describes her brother as her role model and began playing football because of him.

== Club career ==
=== Stattena ===
Mušović began playing football for Stattena IF as a nine-year-old. She was made fun of by those who thought girls should not play football and was asked when she would quit. She started playing in the goalkeeper position at age 12. She spent two seasons with the club's senior women's team in Division 2 in 2011 and 2012, helping the club secure promotion in the latter campaign.

=== Rosengård ===
She transferred from Stattena to LdB FC Malmö in October 2012 at age 16. In 2013 she understudied Þóra Björg Helgadóttir, who was named Goalkeeper of the Year as Malmö secured the 2013 Damallsvenskan championship. Malmö rebranded as FC Rosengård for the 2014 Damallsvenskan and Mušović was elevated to first team contention when Helgadóttir left the club during the mid-season break.

German import Kathrin Längert then vied with Mušović for Rosengård's goalkeeper position. When Mušović secured increasing first team participation in the 2015 Damallsvenskan, the club announced they were pleased with her development and awarded a new 2.5-year contract in May 2015.

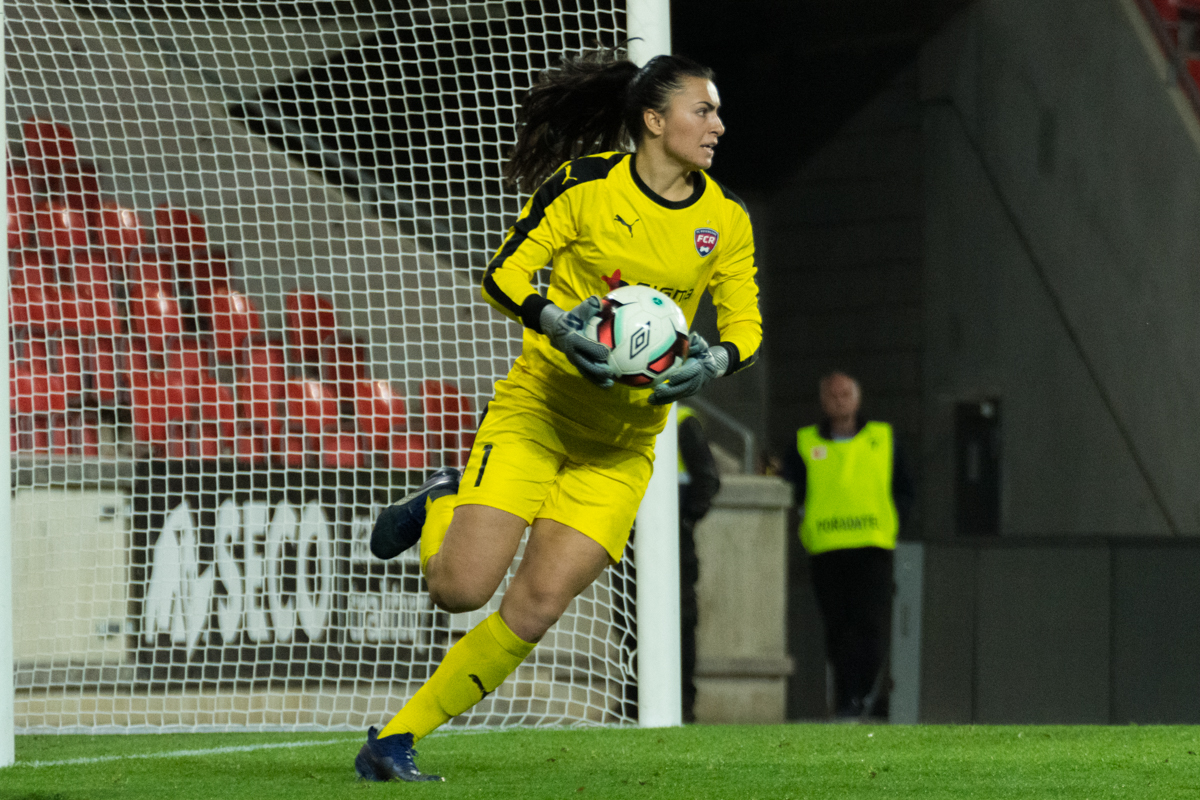
Playing for FC Rosengård in November 2018

Mušović received two setbacks ahead of the 2016 Damallsvenskan season. First Rosengård signed Canadian goalkeeper Erin McLeod, then Mušović broke her arm while playing for Sweden U-23s. In the event McLeod suffered an anterior cruciate ligament injury, so the club had to bring in veteran Sofia Lundgren as cover.

After some long conversations with Rosengård director of football Therese Sjögran, Mušović agreed to remain at the club although she was unhappy at losing her place in the team once McLeod recovered from her injured knee. Instead of making a transfer request, she resolved to improve aspects of her own game by training alongside her experienced Canadian rival.

In October 2017, Mušović was given a new three-year contract by Rosengård. She declared: "FC Rosengård has always been and will always be the club in my heart". Mušović became starting goalkeeper near the end of the season.

=== Chelsea ===
As goalkeeper for Rosengård, Mušović played in a match against Chelsea and saved a penalty, keeping the score 2-2, bringing her to the attention of Chelsea coach Emma Hayes. In December 2020, Mušović signed for Chelsea in a two-year deal. She made her debut against West Ham United, keeping a clean sheet in the 2-0 win. In the 2021–22 season, Mušović had the second-highest save percentage of any goalkeeper in the league, only behind Chelsea's first goalkeeper Ann-Katrin Berger. Mušović was the only goalkeeper that season to record an assist. In February 2023, she extended her contract with Chelsea until 2025. In February 2025, she announced her pregnancy, putting an end to her 2024-25 season. On 9 May 2025 it was announced that Mušović would depart Chelsea upon the expiry of her contract at the end of the 2024-25 season, having kept 27 clean sheets in 52 appearances for the club.

=== Malmö ===
On 27 June 2025, Mušović joined Swedish club Malmö FF on a three-year deal.

== International career ==
Mušović captained Sweden under-19s to the 2015 U19 European Championship final stage in Israel. She was disappointed when FC Rosengård stopped her attending the tournament because they needed her for club fixtures. The disappointment was compounded when Sweden under-19s won the competition.

Despite having lost her position as first choice at club level, Mušović was called up by incoming Sweden national team coach Peter Gerhardsson for the opening 2019 FIFA World Cup qualifiers. She attended several matches as a non-playing substitute, then won her first senior cap in March 2018, securing a debut clean sheet in a 3–0 win over Russia at the 2018 Algarve Cup.

Mušović endured a difficult second appearance for Sweden, when she deputised for Hedvig Lindahl in a friendly against Italy in October 2018. Her handling error allowed Daniela Sabatino to score the only goal of the match. In May 2019 she was one of three goalkeepers selected by Sweden for the 2019 FIFA World Cup, alongside Lindahl and the uncapped Jennifer Falk. She did not play during the World Cup, and continued in her early years with the national team to struggle to earn starts, in particular during major tournaments.

Mušović was part of the Swedish delegation to the 2020 Summer Olympics, where Sweden ultimately reached the final, losing to Canada. She did not take the pitch during the tournament, but drew notice as one of the players to publicly criticize the initial scheduling of the final, which resulted in its being moved to accommodate high temperatures in Tokyo at the time.

On 13 June 2023, Mušović was included in Sweden's 23-player squad for the FIFA World Cup 2023. With Lindahl out, the choice for starting goalkeeper was between her and Falk, with Mušović ultimately earning the distinction. She played the team's first two matches in Group G, victories over South Africa and Italy. In the round of 16 match against the United States, she made 11 saves; the United States did not score a goal during regular or extra time. Mušović broke the record for most saves by a goalkeeper who kept a clean sheet in a World Cup match. Sweden ultimately advanced to the quarter-finals after a 5–4 penalty shootout win, and Mušović was named player of the match, being widely regarded as the principal reason her side had advanced. The match significantly raised her international profile. Sweden went on to beat a favoured Japan in the quarter-final. A loss to Spain in the semi-final sent them to the third-place match, where Mušović kept a clean sheet in a 2–0 victory over hosts Australia, securing her second World Cup bronze.

== Career statistics ==
=== Club ===
As of match played 22 January 2025

Club	Season	League			Domestic cup		League cup		Europe		Total	
Club	Season	Division	Apps	Goals	Apps	Goals	Apps	Goals	Apps	Goals	Apps	Goals
FC Rosengård	2013	Damallsvenskan	2	0	1	0	—		0	0	3	0
FC Rosengård	2014	Damallsvenskan	2	0	5	0	—		0	0	7	0
FC Rosengård	2015	Damallsvenskan	16	0	1	0	—		2	0	19	0
FC Rosengård	2016	Damallsvenskan	13	0	2	0	—		0	0	15	0
FC Rosengård	2017	Damallsvenskan	9	0	3	0	—		6	0	18	0
FC Rosengård	2018	Damallsvenskan	22	0	6	0	—		3	0	31	0
FC Rosengård	2019	Damallsvenskan	21	0	2	0	—		4	0	27	0
FC Rosengård	2020	Damallsvenskan	22	0	1	0	—		2	0	25	0
FC Rosengård	Total		108	0	21	0	—		17	0	146	0
Chelsea	2020–21	Women's Super League	2	0	0	0	0	0	0	0	2	0
Chelsea	2021–22	Women's Super League	10	0	1	0	1	0	3	0	15	0
Chelsea	2022–23	Women's Super League	7	0	3	0	1	0	3	0	14	0
Chelsea	2023–24	Women's Super League	7	0	2	0	1	0	4	0	14	0
Chelsea	2024–25	Women's Super League	0	0	0	0	1	0	5	0	6	0
Chelsea	Total		26	0	6	0	4	0	15	0	51	0
Career total			134	0	27	0	4	0	32	0	197	0

=== International ===
As of match played 13 October 2026

Appearances and goals by national team and year
National team	Year	Apps	Goals
Sweden	2018	2	0
Sweden	2019	0	0
Sweden	2020	2	0
Sweden	2021	1	0
Sweden	2022	3	0
Sweden	2023	11	0
Sweden	2024	8	0
Sweden	2026	1	0
Total		28	0

== Personal life ==
In 2018, Mušović graduated with a degree in economics from Lund University.

Mušović maintains a personal blog at her own website. She has firm political views and challenged two of her social media contacts over their support for the controversial Sweden Democrats party at the 2018 Swedish general election.

Her older brother Huso Mušović was himself a lower division footballer. Mušović is in a relationship with Swedish professional ice hockey player Alen Bibić. In February 2025, she announced she is pregnant.

== Honours ==
FC Rosengård

- Damallsvenskan: 2013, 2014, 2015
- Svenska Cupen: 2016, 2017, 2018
- Svenska Supercupen: 2015, 2016

Chelsea

- FA Women's Super League: 2020–21, 2021–22, 2022–23, 2023–24, 2024–25
- FA Women's League Cup: 2020–21, 2024–25
- Women's FA Cup: 2021–22, 2022–23, 2024–25

Sweden

- FIFA Women's World Cup Third place: 2019, 2023
- Summer Olympics Runner-up: 2020
- Algarve Cup: 2018, 2022
