= Ann-Katrin Berger =

German footballer (born 1990)

- Berger with Gotham FC in 2026

Personal information
- Full name: Ann-Katrin Berger
- Date of birth: 9 October 1990 (age 36)
- Place of birth: Göppingen, Germany
- Height: 1.80 m (5 ft 11 in)
- Position: Goalkeeper

Team information
- Current team: Gotham FC
- Number: 30

Senior career*
Years	Team	Apps	(Gls)
2009–2011	VfL Sindelfingen	26	(0)
2011–2014	1. FFC Turbine Potsdam	19	(0)
2011–2013	1. FFC Turbine Potsdam II	6	(0)
2014–2016	Paris Saint-Germain	12	(0)
2016–2018	Birmingham City	33	(0)
2019–2024	Chelsea	65	(0)
2024–	Gotham FC	73	(0)

International career^{‡}
2009	Germany U19	1	(0)
2020–	Germany	34	(0)
Medal record
Olympic Games
Bronze medal – third place	2024 Paris	Team
UEFA Women's Championship
Silver medal – second place	2022 England
UEFA Women's Nations League
Bronze medal – third place	2024 France–Netherlands–Spain
- * Club domestic league appearances and goals as of 1 November 2026 ‡ National team caps and goals as of 22:23, 06 June 2026 (UTC)

Ann-Katrin „Anne“ Berger (born 9 October 1990) is a German professional footballer who plays as a goalkeeper for National Women's Soccer League (NWSL) club Gotham FC and the Germany national team. She is regarded as one of the best female goalkeepers in the world, with a particular reputation as a penalty stopper.

== Early life ==
At the age of four, Berger began playing football for KSG Eislingen. As a teenager, she moved to FV Faurndau. She played as a striker, midfielder, and defender before switching to goalkeeper at the age of 16, joking she became "too lazy to run," and "has grown" again.

== Club career ==
In 2007, Berger moved up to the Oberliga Baden-Württemberg. A year later, Berger moved to second division side, VfL Sindelfingen. In the summer of 2011, Berger signed a three-year contract with 1. FFC Turbine Potsdam in the Frauen-Bundesliga, the top division in Germany. She made her debut for the club on 21 August 2011 and shut out Hamburger SV 4–0. She made five appearances for the club during the 2011/2012 season playing a total of 450 minutes. Potsdam finished first in the league with an 18–2–2 record. She was the starting goalkeeper in three of Potsdam's 2011–12 UEFA Women's Champions League matches helping the squad earn shut-outs against Þór Akureyri and Glasgow City F.C.

Berger signed with Paris Saint-Germain in June 2014, playing 22 matches in all competitions during her two-year spell with the club. In June 2016, she joined Birmingham City.

In November 2017, Berger was diagnosed with thyroid cancer, for which she received treatment and was able to enter remission. On 4 February 2018, she made her first appearance since being diagnosed with cancer in the Fourth Round of the 2017–18 FA Women's Cup in an away match against Reading. Birmingham won 1–0. She had a brilliant season and won the PFA Team of the Year Award. Berger continued her strong return in 2018, helping Birmingham City to a fourth-place standing after midway point of the 2018–19 FA WSL season.

Having run down her contract at Birmingham City and rejected a new offer, she joined reigning champions Chelsea on 4 January 2019. Chelsea manager Emma Hayes signed her as part of the team rebuild even though Chelsea had three other goalkeepers on their roster.

In April 2021, Berger made title-winning saves away against Manchester City in a 2–2 draw, as Chelsea fought to preserve their lead at the top of the table. Chelsea and manager Emma Hayes later won their 4th WSL title, the most by any WSL team, by 2 points on the final day of the 2020–21 season with a 5–0 victory over Reading. Chelsea broke the records for most wins (18) and most points (57) in a season, and became just the third team to defend the League title after Liverpool and Arsenal. Berger registered the most clean sheets (12), winning the Golden Glove. On 23 August 2022 Berger announced, that she was suffering from thyroid cancer again. A little over a month later, on the 25 September, Berger made her comeback against Manchester City. In March 2023, Berger made the decisive save on Lindsey Horan's shot in the penalty shootout with Lyon, to take Chelsea to the semi-finals in the Women's Champions league.

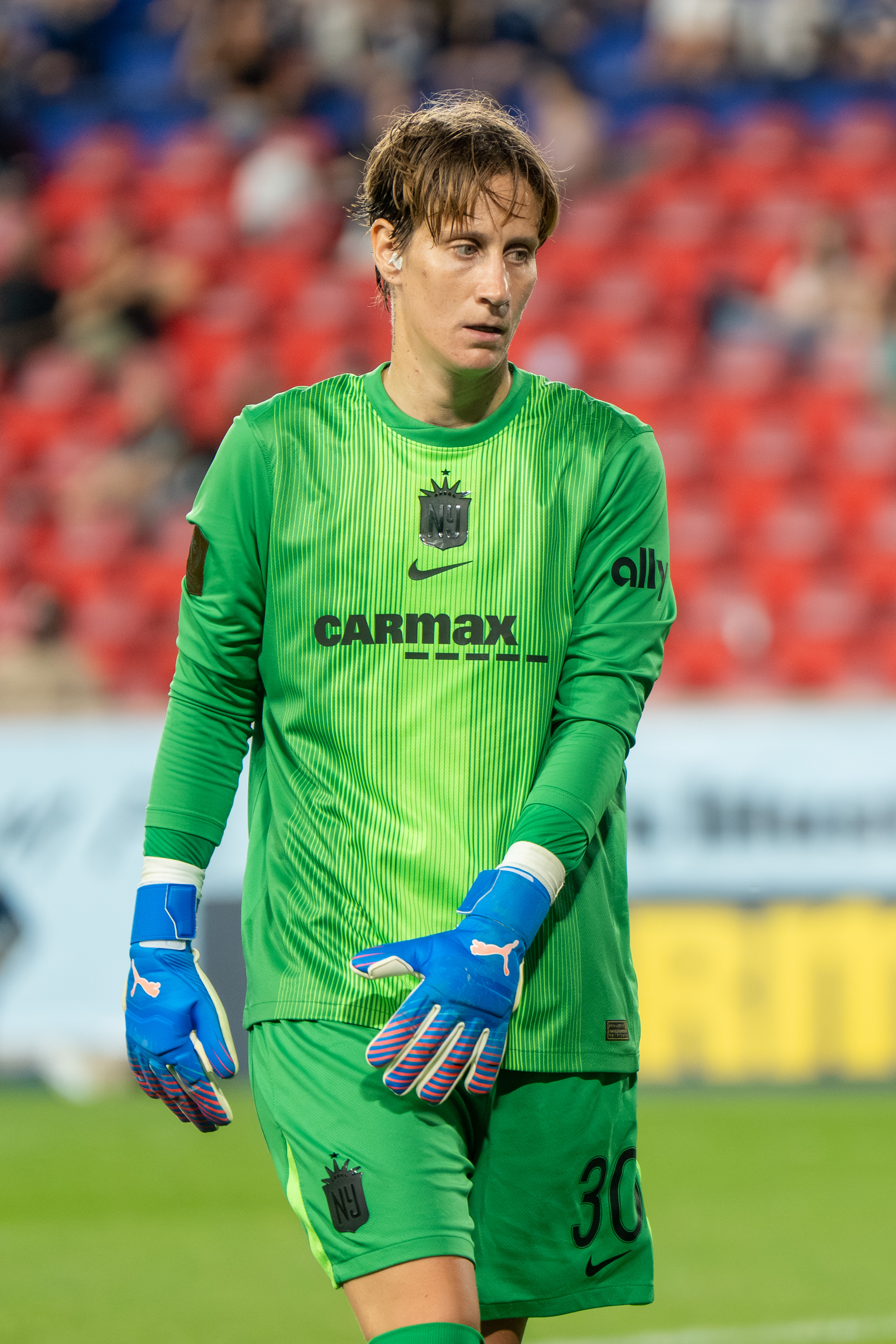
Berger in 2025

In April 2024, it was announced that Berger had signed a one-year contract with an option for an additional year with Gotham FC. In September she extended her contract till 2026. In November 2024, Berger was ranked 25th, as the best goalkeeper worldwide by ESPN, in a list of the “Top 50 soccer players of 2024.” She was named NWSL Goalkeeper of the Year.

On 25 May 2025, she started in the 2025 CONCACAF W Champions Cup final against Tigres, where Gotham won 1–0 to become the inaugural winners of the competition.

On 22 November she won the NWSL Championship with Gotham.

== International career ==
Berger received her first call-up to the Germany national team in November 2018. She made her national debut on December 1, 2020 in the Euro 2022 qualifier against the Republic of Ireland.

She was named in the squad for Euro 2022, but did not play, as Germany finished as runners-up. In July 2023, she was named in the squad for the 2023 World Cup. She made no appearances and for the first time ever, Germany got knocked out after the group stage.

In July 2024, she got selected for the squad for the 2024 Summer Olympics and was promoted to the new number one for this tournament. During the penalty shootouts in the quarter-finals against Canada, she saved two shots from Ashley Lawrence and Adriana Leon before scoring the decisive penalty which qualified her nation to the semi-finals. In the bronze match against Spain she deflected a penalty in the ninth minute of added time and played a big part, why Germany won the bronze medal.

On 12 June 2025, Berger was called up to the Germany squad for the UEFA Women's Euro 2025. In the Women's Euro 2025 quarter-finals against the French national team she made several crucial saves and scored herself in the subsequent penalty-shoot-out. She was officially named "the player of the match." The Guardian called her save in the 103rd minute as "one of the all-time great European Championship saves ever," and the German media ennobeled her as the "hero of an epic evening." The subsequent semi-final against Spain was lost 0-1. The conceded goal, scored by Aitana Bonmatí in extra time shortly before the end, was facilitated by a positional error by Berger. She took full responsibility for this, which was praised by the media as a remarkable reaction.

== Personality ==
Berger is generally regarded as calm and reserved, avoiding the hype surrounding her. She explained, that she had to train herself to achieve this calmness, cause she had been diagnosed with ADHD in childhood and used autogenic training, to become more composed. She is also considered modest, preferring to put her teammates in the spotlight and someone who shies away from the limelight.

Teammates often highlight Berger's mental strength, which helps her remain calm and make the right decisions even in critical situations.

The media attribute a certain aura to her. One that "can intimidate opponents simply, by virtue of that one person in the DFB jersey, spreading her arms between the posts." She is considered the calming influence of the team, providing her teammates with a tremendous sense of security.

== Personal life ==
Since 2017, Berger has been in a relationship with fellow professional footballer Jess Carter. They announced their engagement in May 2024.

Berger is a cancer survivor, and has returned to professional football twice after bouts of thyroid cancer.

Berger is an ambassador and co-founder of the Judan Ali Football Academy, known as JAFA, based in London and founded in 2019.

== Career statistics ==
=== Club ===
As of matches played 11 June 2024

Appearances and goals by club, season and competition
Club	Season	League			National cup		League cup		Continental		Other		Total	
Club	Season	Division	Apps	Goals	Apps	Goals	Apps	Goals	Apps	Goals	Apps	Goals	Apps	Goals
VfL Sindelfingen	2009–10	2. Frauen-Bundesliga	5	0	—		—		—		—		5	0
VfL Sindelfingen	2010–11	2. Frauen-Bundesliga	7	0	—		—		—		—		7	0
VfL Sindelfingen	Total		12	0	—		—		—		—		12	0
Turbine Potsdam	2011–12	Frauen-Bundesliga	5	0	2	0	—		3	0	—		10	0
Turbine Potsdam	2012–13	Frauen-Bundesliga	—		—		—		—		—		0	0
Turbine Potsdam	2013–14	Frauen-Bundesliga	14	0	1	0	—		7	0	—		22	0
Turbine Potsdam	Total		19	0	3	0	—		10	0	—		32	0
Paris Saint-Germain	2014–15	Division 1 Féminine	6	0	—		—		—		—		6	0
Paris Saint-Germain	2015–16	Division 1 Féminine	6	0	—		—		3	0	—		9	0
Paris Saint-Germain	Total		12	0	—		—		3	0	—		15	0
Birmingham City	2016	FA WSL	6	0	—		3	0	—		—		9	0
Birmingham City	2017	FA WSL	5	0	3	0	—		—		—		8	0
Birmingham City	2017–18	FA WSL	14	0	—		2	0	—		—		16	0
Birmingham City	2018–19	FA WSL	8	0	—		3	0	—		—		11	0
Birmingham City	Total		33	0	3	0	8	0	—		—		44	0
Chelsea	2018–19	FA WSL	1	0	—		—		4	0	—		5	0
Chelsea	2019–20	FA WSL	13	0	2	0	2	0	—		—		17	0
Chelsea	2020–21	FA WSL	17	0	3	0	4	0	8	0	1	0	33	0
Chelsea	2021–22	FA WSL	14	0	4	0	2	0	3	0	—		23	0
Chelsea	2022–23	FA WSL	15	0	2	0	2	0	7	0	—		26	0
Chelsea	2023–24	FA WSL	5	0	0	0	0	0	2	0	—		7	0
Chelsea	Total		65	0	11	0	10	0	24	0	1	0	108	0
Gotham FC	2024	NWSL	7	0	—		0	0	—		—		7	0
Career total			148	0	17	0	18	0	37	0	1	0	221	0

=== International ===
As of 6 June 2026

Appearances and goals by national team and year
National team	Year	Apps	Goals
Germany	2020	1	0
Germany	2021	1	0
Germany	2022	2	0
Germany	2023	4	0
Germany	2024	8	0
Germany	2025	12	0
Germany	2026	5	0
Total		34	0

== Honours ==
1. FFC Turbine Potsdam

- Bundesliga: 2011–12
- DFB-Hallenpokal for women: 2014

Birmingham City

- Women's FA Cup: runner-up: 2016–17

Chelsea

- FA Women's Super League: 2019–20, 2020–21, 2021–22, 2022–23
- FA Women's League Cup: 2019–20, 2020–21
- Women's FA Community Shield: 2020
- Women's FA Cup: 2020–21, 2021–22, 2022–23
- UEFA Women's Champions League runner-up: 2020–21

Gotham FC

- NWSL Championship: 2025
- NWSL Shield: 2026
- NWSL Challenge Cup: 2026
- CONCACAF W Champions Cup: 2024–25
- FIFA Women's Champions Cup third place: 2026

Germany

- UEFA Women's Championship runner-up: 2022
- UEFA Women's Nations League third place: 2023–24
- Summer Olympics bronze medal: 2024
- UEFA Women's Nations League runner up: 2025:

Individual

- Women's Super League Golden Glove: 2020–21
- FA WSL PFA Team of the Year: 2017–18, 2019–20, 2020–21, 2021–22
- The 100 Best Female Footballers In The World: 67 (2020), 49 (2021), 32 (2024)
- The Best FIFA Goalkeeper: 3rd in 2021 3rd in 2022
- Women's Footballer of the Year (Germany): 2024, 2025 (together with Giulia Gwinn)
- Silbernes Lorbeerblatt: 2024
- NWSL Team of the Month: May 2024
- NWSL Best XI First Team: 2024, 2026
- NWSL Goalkeeper of the Year: 2024, 2026
- Yashin Trophy: 2nd place (2025), 2nd place (2026)
- Key to the City of New York
- German Football Ambassador: Award Playercategory
