= Aniek Nouwen =

Dutch football player (born 1999)

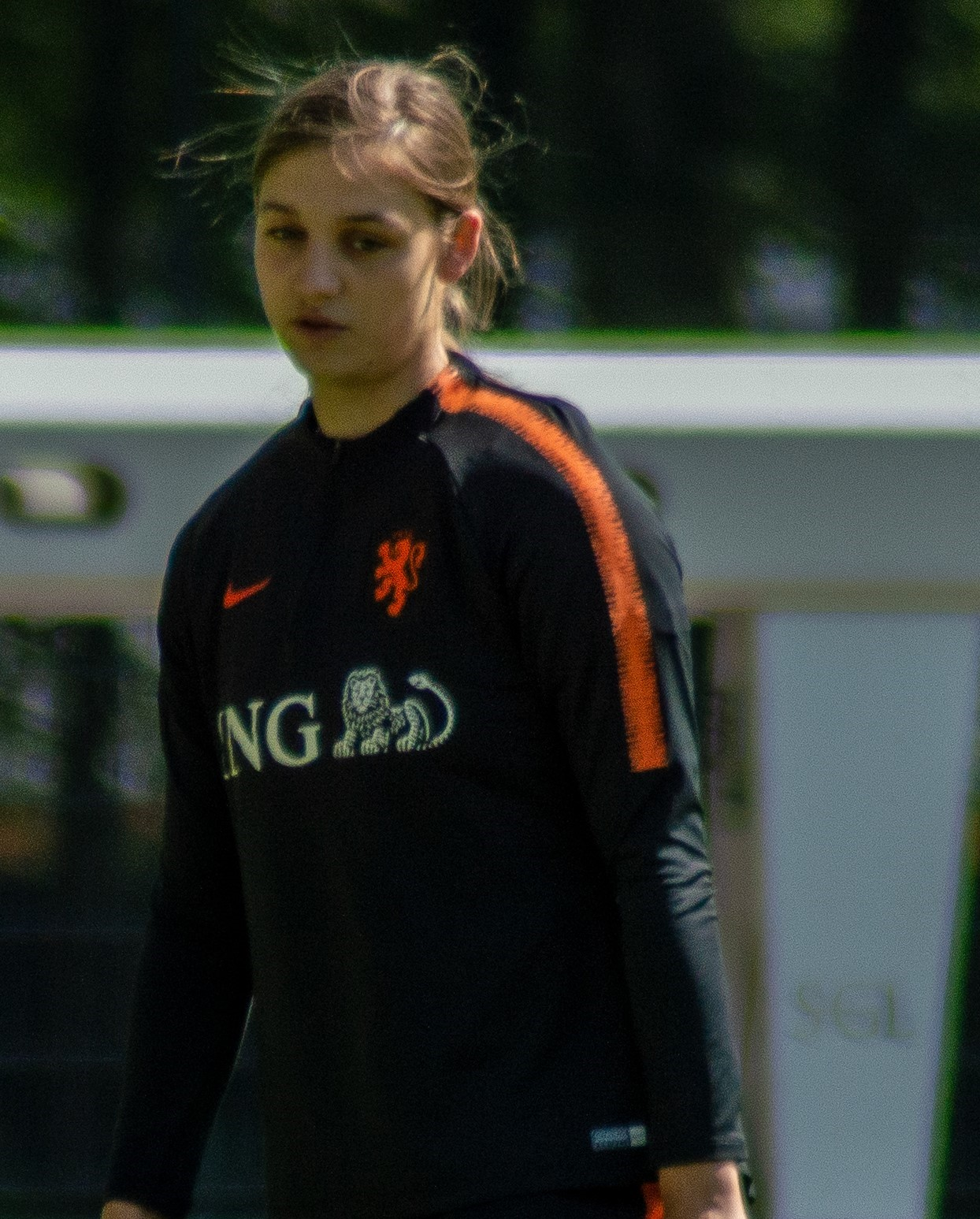
- Nouwen in 2019

Personal information
- Full name: Aniek Nouwen
- Date of birth: 9 March 1999 (age 27)
- Place of birth: Helmond, Netherlands
- Height: 1.75 m (5 ft 9 in)
- Position: Defender

Team information
- Current team: PSV

Youth career
- 2005–2016: SV Deurne

Senior career*
Years	Team	Apps	(Gls)
2016–2021	PSV	101	(19)
2021–2025	Chelsea	18	(1)
2023	→ AC Milan (loan)	11	(0)
2025	→ Crystal Palace (loan)	4	(1)
2025–	PSV	0	(0)

International career^{‡}
2014–2015	Netherlands U16	13	(1)
2014–2016	Netherlands U17	12	(3)
2016–2018	Netherlands U19	16	(2)
2018	Netherlands U20	6	(1)
2023	Netherlands U23	3	(0)
2019–2023	Netherlands	43	(2)
- * Club domestic league appearances and goals as of 15 July 2025 ‡ National team caps and goals as of 1 December 2023

Aniek Nouwen (Dutch: [aːˈnik ˈnʌuə(n)]; born 9 March 1999) is a Dutch professional footballer who plays as a defender for Eredivisie club PSV.

== Club career ==
=== Early career ===
Nouwen played with the SV Deurne boys' team for 11 years, before joining PSV aged 17.

=== PSV ===
Since 2016, Nouwen played professionally for PSV at the Eredivisie, where she recorded 69 appearances and 15 goals for the team. In 2017 and 2018, she and her team were runners-up of the KNVB Women's Cup, the cup competition for women's football in the Netherlands.

=== Chelsea ===
On 12 May 2021, Nouwen agreed pre-contract terms on a three-year deal with Chelsea which commits her to the club until the summer of 2024. She joined them ahead of the 2021/22 campaign.

On 10 October 2021, Nouwen made her first league start for Chelsea in a 2–0 victory against Leicester City, a game in which she would play 90 minutes.

On 26 February 2022, Nouwen scored her first goal for Chelsea in a FA Cup fifth round tie against Leicester City, a game in which Chelsea would go onto win 7–0.

A month later on 27 March 2022, Nouwen scored her first league goal for Chelsea. Once again Leicester City were the opponents, in a game that saw Chelsea win 9–0 away from home.

On 8 May 2022, Nouwen won her first league title as Chelsea lifted the FA WSL trophy on the final day with a 4–2 victory against Manchester United.

On 15 May 2022, Nouwen lifted her second trophy with Chelsea as they defeated Manchester City for the FA Cup, Nouwen played 69 minutes.

On 1 December 2023, Nouwen sustained an anterior cruciate ligament rupture in a friendly with the Netherlands under-23 team against Scotland under-23.

On 6 January 2025, it was announced that Nouwen had signed a contract extension at Chelsea until summer 2026.

==== AC Milan (loan) ====
On 21 January 2023, it was announced that Nouwen had joined Italian side AC Milan on loan for the remainder of the 2022–23 season, while at the same time it was announced she had signed a new deal to remain at Chelsea until 2025. Nouwen played all 90 minutes in each of her final 10 matches for Milan, and helped the club finish third in the Serie A.

==== Crystal Palace (loan) ====
On 30 January 2025, it was announced that Nouwen had joined Crystal Palace on loan for the remainder of the 2024–25 season.

=== Return to PSV ===
On 5 July 2025, Nouwen joined PSV on a three-year contract until June 2028.

== International career ==
Nouwen played for Netherlands U17 team at the 2015 UEFA Women's Under-17 Championship qualification and at the 2016 UEFA Women's Under-17 Championship qualification. In both occasions, the Dutch team failed to qualify to the tournament's Elite round. She also played for the Netherlands U19 team at the 2017 UEFA Women's Under-19 Championship and at the 2018 UEFA Women's Under-19 Championship. In 2017, the team reached the semi-finals where they lost 3–2 to Spain. In 2018, the team was eliminated in the Group Stage due to the goal difference criteria. Nouwen played in all matches for the Netherlands in both tournaments. In 2018, Nouwen was called to represent the Netherlands U20 team at the 2018 FIFA U-20 Women's World Cup. Again, she played all of her team's matches in the tournament. The Dutch team was eliminated in quarter-finals after losing 2–1 for England.

On 4 March 2019, Nouwen made her debut for the Netherlands senior national team when she started and played 63 minutes in the 1–0 defeat for Poland. Two days later, on 6 March, she recorded her second international cap when she replaced Siri Worm in the 66th minute of the match against China PR.

On 23 October 2020, Nouwen scored her first goal for the Netherlands senior national team in a 7–0 victory over Estonia which saw the side qualify for the Women's Euros in 2022. Her second came on 28 June 2022 in a 3–0 victory over Belarus in a World Cup qualifying game.

Nouwen was named to the Netherlands squad for the 2023 World Cup. She made two appearances during the tournament.

== Career statistics ==
=== Club ===
As of match played 26 November 2023

Appearances and goals by club, season and competition
Club	Season	League			National cup (Note: Includes KNVB Women's Cup, Women's FA Cup)		League cup (Note: Includes Eredivisie Cup, FA Women's League Cup)		Continental (Note: Includes UEFA Women's Champions League)		Total	
Club	Season	Division	Apps	Goals	Apps	Goals	Apps	Goals	Apps	Goals	Apps	Goals
PSV	2016–17	Eredivisie	25	3	?	?	?	?	—		25	3
PSV	2017–18	Eredivisie	22	5	?	?	?	?	—		22	5
PSV	2018–19	Eredivisie	22	7	?	?	?	?	—		22	7
PSV	2019–20	Eredivisie	12	2	?	?	?	?	—		12	2
PSV	2020–21	Eredivisie	20	2	3	0	5	0	2	0	30	2
PSV	Total		101	19	3	0	5	0	2	0	111	19
Chelsea	2021–22	Women's Super League	14	1	4	1	3	0	1	0	22	1
Chelsea	2022–23	Women's Super League	3	0	0	0	0	0	1	0	4	0
Chelsea	2023–24	Women's Super League	1	0	0	0	0	0	0	0	1	0
Chelsea	Total		18	1	4	1	3	0	2	0	27	1
AC Milan (loan)	2022–23	Serie A	11	0	4	0	—		—		15	0
Career total			130	20	11	1	8	0	4	0	153	20

=== International ===
As of match played 11 August 2023

Appearances and goals by national team and year
National team	Year	Apps	Goals
Netherlands	2019	5	0
Netherlands	2020	5	1
Netherlands	2021	14	0
Netherlands	2022	13	1
Netherlands	2023	6	0
Total		43	2

Scores and results list Netherlands' goal tally first, score column indicates score after each Nouwen goal.

List of international goals scored by Aniek Nouwen
No.	Date	Venue	Opponent	Score	Result	Competition
1	23 October 2020	Euroborg, Groningen, Netherlands	Estonia	6–0	7–0	2022 UEFA Women's Euro qualification
2	28 June 2022	De Grolsch Veste, Enschede, Netherlands	Belarus	2–0	3–0	2023 FIFA Women's World Cup qualification

== Honours ==
PSV

- KNVB Women's Cup: 2021

Chelsea

- FA WSL: 2021–22, 2023–24
- FA Cup: 2020–21, 2021–22
