= 2021–22 Women's FA Cup =

Tournament details
- Country: England; Wales
- Teams: 417

Final positions
- Champions: Chelsea (4th title)
- Runners-up: Manchester City

Tournament statistics
- Matches played: 400
- Goals scored: 2,016 (5.04 per match)
- Top goal scorer(s): Chloe Williams (Liskeard Athletic); 12 goals

The 2021–22 Women's FA Cup was the 52nd staging of the Women's FA Cup, a knockout cup competition for women's football teams in England. Chelsea were the defending champions, having beaten Arsenal 3–0 in the 2020–21 final which was delayed due to the COVID-19 pandemic and eventually played on 5 December 2021.

The final was won by Chelsea who beat Manchester City after extra time at Wembley Stadium in front of a record attendance of 49,094.

== Teams ==
A total of 417 teams entered the 2021–22 Women's FA Cup, an increase of 41 from the previous year. Unlike previous years, there were no additional preliminary rounds prior to first round qualifying. Tier 5 teams were given an exemption for the first time, entering at the second round qualifying stage. The 50 teams that play in the FA Women's National League Division One (tier 4) are given exemption to the third round qualifying, while teams in the Northern and Southern Premier Divisions (tier 3) enter at the first round proper. Also for the first time, teams in the FA Women's Super League and FA Women's Championship (tiers 1 and 2) entered in different rounds with Championship teams exempt until the third round proper, one round earlier than in previous years, while FA WSL teams remained exempt until the fourth round proper.

Round	Clubs remaining	Clubs involved	Winners from previous round	Games played	Goals scored	Prize money	
Round	Clubs remaining	Clubs involved	Winners from previous round	Games played	Goals scored	Winner	Loser
First round qualifying	417	152	–	68	418	£400	£100
Second round qualifying	341	240 (Note: Tier 5 regional premier division teams added)	76	115	621	£450	£115
Third round qualifying	221	170 (Note: 50 FA Women's National League Division One teams added)	120	82	402	£600	£150
First round	136	112 (Note: 27 FA Women's National League Premier Division teams added)	85	56	272	£850	£215
Second round	80	56	56	28	115	£1,000	£250
Third round	52	40 (Note: 12 FA Women's Championship teams added)	28	20	78	£1,250	£315
Fourth round	32	32 (Note: 12 FA WSL teams added)	20	16	56	£2,000	£500
Fifth round	16	16	16	8	28	£3,000	£750
Quarter-final	8	8	8	4	14	£4,000	£1,000
Semi-final	4	4	4	2	7	£5,000	£1,250
Final	2	2	2	1	5	£25,000	£15,000

== First round qualifying ==
The competition started at the first round qualifying stage with 76 matches played in September 2021, made up of teams from the seventh-tier county leagues and randomly drawn tier six regional second division teams.

Tie	Home team (tier)	Score	Away team (tier)	Att.
1	Birtley Town (7)	2–5	Hartlepool Pools Youth (7)	
2	Darlington (7)	4–2	CLS Amazons (7)	
3	Penrith AFC (6)	7–2	Gateshead Leam Rangers (7)	
4	Stanwix (7)	2–2 (4–5 p)	Bishop Auckland (6)	
5	West Allotment Celtic (6)	9–0	Carlisle United (6)	
6	Guisborough Town (6)	0–12	Gateshead FC (7)	
7	Durham United (7)	1–4	Workington Reds (6)	
8	Thornaby FC (7)	3–8	Boro Rangers (6)	
9	Epworth Town Colts Belles (7)	A–W	St Joseph's Rockware of Worksop (6)	
Epworth Town Colts Belles withdrew.
10	Dronfield Town (7)	2–1	Barnsley FC (6)	
11	South Cave Sporting Club (7)	0–10	Altofts (6)	
12	Appleby Frodingham (6)	0–7	Grimsby Borough (6)	
13	Yorkshire Amateur (7)	1–4	Hull United (6)	
14	Ripon City (7)	3–2	Hepworth United (6)	
15	Harworth Colliery (7)	3–0	Cleethorpes Town (6)	
16	Silsden AFC (7)	1–4	Farsley Celtic Juniors (6)	
17	Ashton United (7)	2–3	Hindley Juniors (6)	
18	Didsbury (6)	2–1	Nantwich Town (7)	
19	Macclesfield Town (7)	6–4	Pilkington (7)	
20	Penwortham Town (6)	1–2	Northwich Vixens (6)	
21	Warrington Wolves Foundation (6)	2–4	Blackburn Community SC (6)	
22	Ashton Town Lionesses (7)	3–1	West Kirby (6)	
23	Sandbach United (7)	2–3	BRNESC (7)	
24	Alder FC (6)	3–4	Haslingden (6)	
25	Runcorn Linnets (6)	4–1	Preston North End (6)	
26	Salford City Lionesses (5)	5–4	Curzon Ashton (6)	
27	Wythenshawe Amateurs (6)	4–0	Egerton FC (7)	
28	Hinckley (7)	0–10	Nottingham Trent University (6)	
29	Bugbrooke St Michaels (7)	4–4 (5–4 p)	Rugby Town (6)	
30	Sherwood FC (6)	0–3	Kettering Town (6)	
31	Coalville Town (6)	1–3	Leicester Road (6)	
32	Anstey Nomads (6)	6–0	Ketton (7)	
33	Thrapston Town (6)	2–0	Rugby Borough (6)	
34	Arnold Eagles (6)	6–1	Nuneaton Borough (7)	
35	Westfields (6)	H–W	Staffordshire Victoria (7)	
Staffordshire Victoria withdrew.
36	Solihull Sporting (6)	H–W	Balls To Cancer (7)	
Balls To Cancer withdrew.
37	Walsall (6)	1–4	Shrewsbury Town (6)	
38	Droitwich Spa (6)	1–3	AFC Telford United (6)	

Tie	Home team (tier)	Score	Away team (tier)	Att.
39	Kingfisher (6)	3–1	Port Vale (6)	
40	Walsall Wood (6)	6–1	Sedgley & Gornal United (6)	
41	Sandwell (6)	2–1	Redditch Borough (7)	
42	Shifnal Town (6)	10–1	Wyrley (6)	
43	Doveridge (7)	3–1	Cookley Sports (6)	
44	Knowle (6)	1–1 (7–6 p)	Darlaston Town (6)	
45	March Town United (7)	0–6	Haverhill Rovers (6)	
46	Newmarket Town (6)	3–1	AFC Sudbury (6)	
47	Wootton Blue Cross (6)	0–2	Garston (7)	
48	Rayleigh Town (7)	1–5	Southend United Community SC (7)	
49	Chelmsford City (7)	10–0	Houghton Athletic (7)	
50	Herts Vipers (6)	9–0	Hemel Hempstead Town (7)	
51	Sutton United (6)	1–0	Meridian (6)	
52	Cray Valley (PM) (7)	1–3	Tunbridge Wells Foresters (7)	
53	Bexhill United (6)	0–0 (3–4 p)	Glebe (7)	
54	Hastings United (6)	9–0	Regents Park Rangers (7)	
55	Phoenix Sports (6)	1–9	Bromley (7)	
56	Borough Green (6)	H–W	Ramsgate (7)	
Ramsgate FC withdrew.
57	Eversley & California (6)	H–W	Wokingham & Emmbrook (6)	
Wokingham & Emmbrook withdrew.
58	Caversham United (7)	3–1	Warminster Town (6)	
59	AFC Acorns (6)	2–2 (4–3 p)	Leatherhead FC (7)	
60	Badshot Lea (7)	4–0	Burgess Hill Town (7)	
61	Woking (6)	2–1	Abbey Rangers (6)	
62	Steyning Town Community (7)	9–0	Eastbourne Town (7)	
63	Woodingdean (7)	1–8	Seaford Town (7)	
64	Chichester City (6)	2–2 (3–1 p)	Montpelier Villa (7)	
65	Hassocks (7)	0–4	Eastbourne United AFC (7)	
66	QK Southampton (7)	4–5	Shanklin (7)	
67	Fleet Town (7)	H–W	Shaftesbury (7)	
Shaftesbury withdrew.
68	Bursledon (7)	0–6	AFC Stoneham (6)	
69	Gloucester City (7)	3–2	Weston Super Mare (6)	
70	Almondsbury (6)	H–W	Olveston United AFC (7)	
Match abandoned with Olveston United leading 3–2. Olveston United declined to replay the tie and withdrew.
71	Downend Flyers (6)	3–3 (3–5 p)	Paulton Rovers (6)	
72	Chipping Sodbury Town (6)	2–4	AEK Boco (6)	
73	Pucklechurch Sports (7)	1–1 (3–1 p)	Bristol Rovers (6)	
74	Ottery St Mary (6)	H–W	RNAS Culdrose (7)	
RNAS Culdrose withdrew.
75	Feniton (6)	12–0	Signal Box Oak Villa (7)	
76	Liskeard Athletic (6)	28–0	Callington Town (7)	

== Second round qualifying ==
120 matches were played in the second round qualifying in October 2021, made up of the 76 winning teams from the first round qualifying and included the introduction of 164 teams from the fifth-tier regional first division football leagues and the remaining sixth-tier teams.

Tie	Home team (tier)	Score	Away team (tier)	Att.
1	Gateshead Rutherford (7)	0–2	Penrith AFC (6)	
2	Wallsend BC (5)	2–2 (4–5 p)	Sunderland West End (5)	
3	Washington Association (6)	3–1	West Allotment Celtic (6)	
4	Hartlepool Pools Youth (7)	1–3	Darlington (7)	
5	Bishop Auckland (6)	2–1	Blyth Town (6)	
6	Hartlepool United (5)	7–2	Workington Reds (6)	
7	Gateshead FC (7)	2–1	Spennymoor Town (6)	
8	South Shields (5)	3–2	Chester Le Street United (6)	
9	Boro Rangers (6)	A–W	Redcar Town (5)	
Boro Rangers withdrew.
10	St Joseph's Rockware of Worksop (6)	1–2	Thackley AFC (6)	
11	Harworth Colliery (7)	1–6	Wakefield Trinity (5)	
12	Oughtibridge War Memorial (5)	1–2	Hull United (6)	
13	Ossett United (5)	5–2	Farsley Celtic Juniors (6)	
14	York City (5)	9–2	Brighouse Sports (6)	
15	Grimsby Borough (6)	1–3	Chesterfield (5)	
16	Harrogate Town (5)	4–1	Ripon City (7)	
17	Rotherham United (5)	4–2	Sheffield Wednesday (5)	
18	Bradford Park Avenue (6)	1–2	Millmoor Juniors (6)	
19	Dronfield Town (7)	3–2	Grimsby Town (6)	
20	Altofts (6)	1–2	Farsley Celtic (5)	
21	Altrincham (6)	4–2	Ashton Town Lionesses (7)	
22	Sir Tom Finney FC (6)	6–1	Marine (6)	
23	Merseyrail (5)	10–0	Wythenshawe Amateurs (6)	
24	West Didsbury & Chorlton (5)	0–1	Tranmere Rovers (5)	
25	Morecambe (5)	7–1	Macclesfield Town (7)	
26	Chester (6)	4–5	Salford City Lionesses (5)	
27	Blackburn Community SC (6)	5–0	Sale United (6)	
28	Fleetwood Town Wrens (5)	1–0	Accrington Stanley (6)	
29	Northwich Vixens (6)	1–2	Cheadle Town Stingers (5)	
30	AFC Darwen (5)	11–0	Didsbury (6)	
31	Hindley Juniors (6)	1–3	Mossley Hill (5)	
32	BRNESC (7)	4–2	Runcorn Linnets (6)	
33	Haslingden (6)	3–5	Crewe Alexandra (5)	
34	Notts County (5)	2–0	Kettering Town (6)	
35	Rise Park (5)	0–7	Northampton Town (5)	
36	Woodlands (5)	0–5	Anstey Nomads (6)	
37	Nottingham Trent University (6)	10–1	Bugbrooke St Michaels (7)	
38	Leicester Road (6)	4–0	Leicester City Ladies (5)	
39	Loughborough Students (5)	4–2	Arnold Eagles (6)	
40	Thrapston Town (6)	H–W	Stewarts & Lloyds (6)	
Stewarts & Lloyds withdrew.
41	Lincoln United (5)	5–0	Oadby & Wigston (6)	
42	Allexton & New Parks (6)	0–10	Mansfield Town (5)	
43	Kingfisher (6)	0–1	Lichfield City (5)	
44	Sutton Coldfield Town (5)	2–0	Redditch United (5)	
45	Stourbridge (5)	6–1	Kidderminster Harriers (5)	
46	Tamworth Academy (6)	1–3	Lye Town (5)	
47	Leamington Lions (6)	3–2	Coventry Sphinx (5)	
48	Westfields (6)	1–6	Shrewsbury Town (6)	
49	Coundon Court (5)	0–2	Knowle (6)	
50	Worcester City (5)	1–2	Shifnal Town (6)	
51	Walsall Wood (6)	0–3	AFC Telford United (6)	
52	Crusaders (5)	8–0	Hereford Pegasus (6)	
53	Tamworth FC (5)	7–0	Doveridge (7)	
54	Sandwell (6)	3–10	Solihull Sporting (6)	
55	Peterborough Northern Star (6)	A–W	East Bergholt United (6)	
Peterborough Northern Star withdrew.
56	Needham Market (6)	5–1	Sprowston (6)	
57	St Ives Town (5)	3–2	Newmarket Town (6)	
58	Histon (7)	A–W	Whittlesey Athletic (6)	
Histon withdrew.
59	Wroxham (5)	H–W	Bury Town (6)	
Bury Town withdrew.
60	Netherton United (7)	5–2	Bungay Town (6)	

Tie	Home team (tier)	Score	Away team (tier)	Att.
61	Haverhill Rovers (6)	0–10	Wymondham Town (5)	
62	Brett Vale (6)	1–5	King's Lynn Town (5)	
63	Watford Development (6)	2–5	Chelmsford City (7)	
64	Royston Town (5)	1–2	Bowers & Pitsea (5)	
65	Headstone Manor (7)	2–3	Biggleswade United (6)	
66	Garston (7)	2–3	Southend United Community SC (7)	
67	Herts Vipers (6)	7–1	AFC Dunstable (5)	
68	Bedford (5)	2–0	Hutton (6)	
69	Frontiers (7)	1–1 (3–0 p)	Wodson Park (6)	
70	Luton Town (5)	12–1	Oaklands Wolves (6)	
71	Leigh Ramblers (6)	3–0	Colney Heath (5)	
72	Margate (6)	1–10	Sutton United (6)	
73	Dulwich Hamlet (5)	1–1 (2–3 p)	Herne Bay (6)	
74	Haringey Borough (5)	3–6	Clapton Community (7)	
75	Glebe (7)	0–4	Millwall Lionesses (5)	
76	Maidstone United (6)	0–7	Bromley (7)	
77	Ashford (6)	1–1 (1–4 p)	Hackney (6)	
78	Islington Borough (7)	1–2	Hastings United (6)	
79	Welling United (6)	5–0	Borough Green (6)	
80	New London Lionesses (5)	4–0	Aylesford (5)	
81	Dartford (5)	11–1	Tunbridge Wells Foresters (7)	
82	Abingdon Town (5)	6–0	Long Crendon (6)	
83	Royal Wootton Bassett Town (5)	4–5	Denham United (5)	
84	Ascot United (5)	3–0	Tilehurst Panthers (6)	
85	Eversley & California (6)	2–4	Caversham United (7)	
86	Milton United (6)	7–2	Woodley United (5)	
87	Wycombe Wanderers (5)	6–0	Sport London e Benfica (6)	
88	Brentford (6)	2–5	Abingdon United (5)	
89	Ashford Town (Middx) (5)	25–0	Highworth Town (6)	
90	FC Chippenham (6)	1–2	Oxford City (5)	
91	Walton Casuals (6)	1–1 (5–4 p)	Woking (6)	
92	Worthing (5)	6–0	Newhaven (6)	
93	Lancing (7)	0–0 (3–5 p)	Seaford Town (7)	
94	AFC Acorns (6)	1–0	Badshot Lea (7)	
95	Steyning Town Community (7)	7–1	Roffey (7)	
96	Fulham (5)	3–1	Eastbourne United AFC (7)	
97	Chichester City (6)	2–3	AFC Littlehampton (7)	
98	Whyteleafe (5)	0–4	Dorking Wanderers (6)	
99	Ashmount Leigh (7)	2–2 (9–10 p)	Saltdean United (5)	
100	Fleet Town (7)	H–W	Holt United (6)	
Holt United withdrew.
101	Shanklin (7)	0–2	Bournemouth Sports (6)	
102	Winchester City Flyers (5)	2–6	New Milton Town (6)	
103	Weymouth (7)	5–1	Alton (7)	
104	Merley Cobham Sports (6)	A–W	AFC Stoneham (6)	
Merley Cobham Sports withdrew.
105	Moneyfields (5)	H–W	Redlands (6)	
Redlands withdrew.
106	United Services Portsmouth (6)	0–7	Eastleigh In The Community (5)	
107	Middlezoy Rovers (5)	5–4	Oldland Abbotonians (6)	
108	Sherborne Town (5)	4–1	Pucklechurch Sports (7)	
109	Forest Green Rovers (5)	5–1	Almondsbury (6)	
110	Paulton Rovers (6)	1–2	AEK Boco (6)	
111	Brislington (6)	A–W	Longwell Green (6)	
Brislington withdrew.
112	Bristol Ladies Union (6)	3–0	Longlevens (6)	
113	Gloucester City (7)	0–11	Ilminster Town (5)	
114	Frampton Rangers (6)	0–2	Bishops Lydeard (5)	
115	Ottery St Mary (6)	0–11	Liskeard Athletic (6)	
116	Torquay United (5)	3–0	Helston Athletic (6)	
117	Axminster Town (6)	3–2	Budleigh Salterton (6)	
118	Saltash United (6)	H–W	Halwill (6)	
Halwill withdrew.
119	Bideford (5)	2–5	Feniton (6)	
120	AFC St Austell (5)	7–0	Marine Academy Plymouth (5)	

== Third round qualifying ==
85 matches were played in the third round qualifying in October 2021, made up of the 120 winning teams from the second round qualifying and including the introduction of 50 teams from the fourth-tier FA Women's National League Division One.

Tie	Home team (tier)	Score	Away team (tier)	Att.
1	Morecambe (5)	0–5	South Shields (5)	
2	Durham Cestria (4)	3–0	Merseyrail (5)	
3	Sir Tom Finney FC (6)	H–W	Bolton Ladies (4)	
Bolton Ladies withdrew.
4	Alnwick Town (4)	6–0	Penrith AFC (6)	
5	Bradford City (4)	2–0	Ossett United (5)	
6	Tranmere Rovers (5)	2–2 (2–4 p)	Cheadle Town Stingers (5)	
7	Farsley Celtic (5)	8–2	Darlington (7)	
8	Crewe Alexandra (5)	1–0	Sunderland West End (5)	
9	Mossley Hill (5)	4–0	Bishop Auckland (6)	
10	Redcar Town (5)	0–4	Leeds United (4)	
11	Wakefield Trinity (5)	2–2 (4–3 p)	Hull United (6)	
12	Washington Association (6)	0–4	Fleetwood Town Wrens (5)	
13	Chester-le-Street (4)	0–2	Chorley (4)	
14	F.C. United of Manchester (4)	12–1	BRNESC (7)	115
15	York City (5)	0–3	Newcastle United (4)	
16	Barnsley (4)	3–0	Salford City Lionesses (5)	
Barnsley later removed for fielding an unregistered player. Salford City Lionesses reinstated.
17	Stockport County (4)	1–2	Liverpool Feds (4)	
18	Gateshead (7)	0–2	Harrogate Town (5)	
19	Altrincham (6)	0–7	Norton & Stockton Ancients (4)	
20	Hartlepool United (5)	3–3 (6–5 p)	AFC Darwen (5)	
21	Blackburn Community SC (6)	6–0	Thackley AFC (6)	
22	Lye Town (5)	9–0	Whittlesey Athletic (6)	
23	Knowle (6)	3–3 (5–4 p)	Loughborough Students (5)	
24	Leicester Road (6)	1–12	Leafield Athletic (4)	
25	Holwell Sports (4)	2–3	Lincoln City (4)	
26	Netherton United (7)	3–2	Anstey Nomads (6)	
27	AFC Telford United (6)	3–0	Rotherham United (5)	
28	Crusaders (5)	0–5	Solihull Moors (4)	
29	Thrapston Town (6)	1–5	Sporting Khalsa (4)	
30	Shifnal Town (6)	2–1	Notts County (5)	
31	Leek Town (4)	3–3 (4–5 p)	Sutton Coldfield Town (5)	
32	Doncaster Rovers Belles (4)	3–0	Nottingham Trent University (6)	
33	Lincoln United (5)	6–1	Millmoor Juniors (6)	
34	Chesterfield (5)	1–2	Bedworth United (4)	
35	Shrewsbury Town (6)	3–2	Wem Town (4)	
36	Dronfield Town (7)	2–10	Peterborough United (4)	
37	Lichfield City (5)	2–1	Boldmere St. Michaels (4)	
38	Tamworth FC (5)	0–1	Northampton Town (5)	
39	Burton Albion (4)	2–1	Mansfield Town (5)	
40	Solihull Sporting (6)	1–9	Stourbridge (5)	
41	Leamington Lions (6)	0–4	Long Eaton United (4)	
42	Biggleswade United (6)	0–2	Clapton Community (7)	268
43	Southend United Community SC (7)	3–0	Frontiers (7)	

Tie	Home team (tier)	Score	Away team (tier)	Att.
44	Luton Town (5)	3–2	Wroxham (5)	
45	Harlow Town (4)	0–2	Norwich City (4)	
46	Hashtag United (4)	2–1	Enfield Town (4)	
47	Leigh Ramblers (6)	1–5	Wymondham Town (5)	
48	St Ives Town (5)	0–5	Cambridge City (4)	
49	King's Lynn Town (5)	0–3	Cambridge United (4)	
50	Needham Market (6)	3–6	Billericay Town (4)	
51	London Seaward (4)	8–0	Chelmsford City (7)	
52	Bedford (5)	2–2 (4–3 p)	Bowers & Pitsea (5)	
53	Hackney (6)	2–5	Stevenage (4)	
54	East Bergholt United (6)	3–4	Herts Vipers (6)	
55	Queens Park Rangers (4)	4–0	Caversham United (7)	
56	Herne Bay (6)	2–1	Wycombe Wanderers (5)	
57	Steyning Town Community (7)	3–1	Milton United (6)	
58	Dorking Wanderers (6)	5–0	Seaford Town (7)	
59	AFC Acorns (6)	1–5	Southampton Women (4)	
60	Abingdon Town (5)	2–1	Moneyfields (5)	
61	Bromley (7)	2–0	Hastings United (6)	536
62	New London Lionesses (5)	1–2	Ashford Town (Middx) (5)	
63	Kent Football United (4)	0–0 (5–4 p)	Denham United (5)	
64	Chesham United (4)	3–0	Maidenhead United (4)	
65	AFC Wimbledon (4)	7–1	Walton Casuals (6)	1,405
66	Saltdean United (5)	1–3	Actonians (4)	
67	Fulham (5)	1–1 (6–5 p)	Dartford (5)	
68	Millwall Lionesses (5)	5–1	Fleet Town (7)	
69	Ascot United (5)	4–0	Oxford City (5)	
70	Welling United (6)	1–2	Sutton United (6)	
71	Worthing (5)	5–0	AFC Littlehampton (7)	
72	AFC Stoneham (6)	4–0	Feniton (6)	
73	AFC Bournemouth (4)	H–W	Saltash United (6)	
Saltash United withdrew.
74	Abingdon Town (5)	2–2 (8–7 p)	Portishead Town (4)	
75	Swindon Town (4)	8–0	Longwell Green (6)	
76	Weymouth (6)	0–13	Sherborne Town (5)	
77	Poole Town (4)	0–6	Torquay United (5)	
78	Cheltenham Town (4)	3–1	Larkhall Athletic (4)	
79	Liskeard Athletic (6)	4–0	Axminster Town (6)	
80	Bristol Ladies Union (6)	0–8	Ilminster Town (5)	
81	Exeter City (4)	H–W	Buckland Athletic (4)	
Buckland Athletic withdrew.
82	AEK Boco (6)	3–4	AFC St Austell (5)	
83	Middlezoy Rovers (5)	0–3	New Milton Town (6)	
84	Eastleigh In The Community (5)	2–0	Forest Green Rovers (5)	
85	Bournemouth Sports (6)	3–3 (5–4 p)	Bishops Lydeard (5)	

== First round proper ==
56 matches were played in the first round proper in November 2021, made up of the 85 winning teams from the third round qualifying and included the introduction of 27 from teams the third-tier FA Women's National League Premier Division.

Number of teams per tier still in competition
Super League	Championship	Premier Division	Division One	Regional & County	Total
12 / 12	12 / 12	27 / 27	35 / 35	50 / 50	136 / 136

14 November 2021	Abingdon Town (5)	1–4	Gillingham (3)	Wallingford
	Kerby 90'	Report	36'; 43'; Griffin 48'; 90+2'	Stadium: Wallingford Sports Park

14 November 2021	Abingdon United (5)	0–3	Southampton Women (4)	Abingdon-on-Thames
		Report	Mear 34'; Okoro 58'; Wylie 63'	Stadium: The Northcourt; Attendance: 163

14 November 2021	AFC St Austell (5)	2–0	Torquay United (5)	St Austell
	Overton 23'; Lane 43'	Report		Stadium: Poltair Park

14 November 2021	AFC Stoneham (6)	0–6	Eastleigh In The Community (5)	Eastleigh
		Report	Littleboy 3', 74'; Nightingale 16', 71', 78'; Naprta 30'	Stadium: Stoneham Football Complex

14 November 2021	AFC Telford United (6)	0–4	Leafield Athletic (4)	Wellington
		Report	McCormack 63'; Clements 77', 90+1'; Johnson 86'	Stadium: New Bucks Head; Attendance: 134

14 November 2021	Ascot United (5)	0–4	Chichester & Selsey (3)	Ascot
		Report	Wild 2', 25', 55'; Saunders 90+1'	Stadium: The Racecourse Ground; Attendance: 100; Referee: Stephen Saunders

14 November 2021	Billericay Town (4)	5–1	Luton Town (5)	Billericay
	Lockett 14'; Rushen 22'; Drewe 34'; Chong 41'; Blackie 64'	Report	Milton 45'	Stadium: New Lodge; Attendance: 111

14 November 2021	Blackburn Community Sports Club (6)	0–1	Hull City (3)	Blackburn
		Report	Tanser 82'	Stadium: Harrison Playing Fields

14 November 2021	Bournemouth Sports (6)	1–2	AFC Bournemouth (4)	Bournemouth
	Mosley 88'	Report	Bath 28'; Copper 90+3'	Stadium: Chapel Gate

14 November 2021	Burnley (3)	2–0	Durham Cestria (4)	Leyland
	Thomas 15'; Willis 32'	Report		Stadium: [County Ground

14 November 2021	Burton Albion (4)	0–4	Lincoln City (4)	Rocester
		Report	Carr 1'; Hardy 3', 84'; Wilcock 50'	Stadium: Hillsfield Stadium

14 November 2021	Cheadle Town Stingers (5)	1–2	Bradford City (4)	Cheadle
	Hastie 74'	Report	Norde 56'; Stube 65'	Stadium: Park Road Stadium; Attendance: 52

14 November 2021	Cheltenham Town (4)	4–0	Liskeard Athletic (6)	Cirencester
	Grove 14', 69'; Barbour-Gresham 61'; Liggett 81'	Report		Stadium: Corinium Stadium

14 November 2021	Chesham United (4)	3–2	Cambridge United (4)	Chesham
	Fraser 2', 73'; Nuttall 4'	Report	Davies 38'; Otten 55'	Stadium: The Meadow

14 November 2021	Chorley (4)	4–4 (a.e.t.) (4–1 p)	Middlesbrough (3)	Chorley
	Collins 29', 63', 90'; Searson 55'	Report	Dale 17', 20', 52', 67'	Stadium: Blainscough Park
	Penalties
	Penalty scored		Penalty scored Penalty missed

14 November 2021	Bedford (5)	1–1 (3–4 p)	Clapton Community (7)	Kempston
	Fensome 45'	Report	Boiro 4'	Stadium: Hillgrounds Leisure; Attendance: 500
	Penalties
	Penalty scored Penalty missed		(penalty scored) Nutman

14 November 2021	Crawley Wasps (3)	3–2	London Bees (3)	Horley
	Swaby 49'; Stephens 74', 90'	Report	Puddefoot 26'; Jancey 39'	Stadium: The New Defence; Referee: Olga Suaikevic

14 November 2021	Crewe Alexandra (5)	0–5	West Bromwich Albion (3)	Crewe
		Report	Dugmore 12', 33', 45'; Starker 70', 76'	Stadium: Cumberland Arena

14 November 2021	Derby County (3)	2–3	Stourbridge (5)	Mickleover
	Joyce 2'; Hamilton 71'	Report	Rodgers 27'; Nicklin 39'; Murphy 90+1'	Stadium: Station Road

14 November 2021	Exeter City (4)	3–1	Cardiff City (3)	Cullompton
	Pengelly 6', 65', 90'	Report	Roberts 69'	Stadium: Speeds Meadow

14 November 2021	Farsley Celtic (5)	2–0	Mossley Hill (5)	Farsley
	Brierley 60'; Sales 69'	Report		Stadium: Throstle Nest; Attendance: 61

14 November 2021	F.C. United Of Manchester (4)	0–1	Brighouse Town (3)	Moston
		Report	John 22'	Stadium: Broadhurst Park; Attendance: 140

14 November 2021	Fulham (5)	0–3	Oxford United (4)	Motspur Park
		Report	King 44'; Lumsden 74'; Ackerman 90+1'	Stadium: Fulham FC Training Ground; Attendance: 300

14 November 2021	Hartlepool United (5)	0–4	Leeds United (4)	Hartlepool
		Report	Bartup 36'; Brown 47'; P. Williams 87'	Stadium: Grayfields Sports Pavilion; Attendance: 250

14 November 2021	Hashtag United (4)	17–0	Southend United Community Sports Club (7)	Canvey Island
	Abrehart 5', 10', 57', 77'; Apinida 8', 60', 61', 65'; Clarke 12', 35'; Adamson 16', 90'; Adams 29', 32'; Baker 63', 66'; Gillard 80'	Report		Stadium: Park Lane; Attendance: 171

14 November 2021	Herne Bay (6)	1–8	Actonians (4)	Herne Bay
	Tucker	Report	Barecca 41', 42', 47', 85'; Odofin 46', 78', 90'; Shakes 90'	Stadium: MBS Stadium; Attendance: 165

14 November 2021	Herts Vipers (6)	3–6	Stevenage (4)	Letchworth
	90'; 63'; 10'	Report	Harrison 31'; Pryor 75', 117'; Emmings 90+2'; Greenwood 98', 105'	Stadium: Pixmore Pitches

14 November 2021	Huddersfield Town (3)	20–0	Sir Tom Finney (6)	Shelley
	Crossman; Fletcher; Laughton; Marsden; Montgomery; Sowerby; Stanley	Report		Stadium: Stafflex Arena; Attendance: 117

14 November 2021	Ilminster Town (5)	3–0	Sherborne Town (5)	Ilminster
	25' (o.g.); Cornwall 18', 85'	Report		Stadium: The Recreation Ground

14 November 2021	Keynsham Town (3)	3–5	Plymouth Argyle (3)	Keynsham
	8'; 29'; 77'	Report	Knapman 3', 37', 47'; Cunningham 42'; Alphous 45'	Stadium: Crown Field

14 November 2021	Liverpool Feds (4)	2–0	Fleetwood Town Wrens (5)	Aigburth
	Cole 43'; Stewart 78'	Report		Stadium: Jericho Lane

14 November 2021	London Seaward (4)	0–2	Cambridge City (4)	Walthamstow
		Report	Stanley 7', 15'	Stadium: Wadham Lodge; Attendance: 60

14 November 2021	Long Eaton United (4)	4–0	Peterborough United (4)	Long Eaton
	Atkin; Hicks; Huskisson-Moore; McIntosh	Report		Stadium: Grange Park; Attendance: 55

14 November 2021	Millwall Lionesses (5)	0–2	AFC Wimbledon (4)	Rotherhithe
		Report	Stanley 79'; Donovan 89'	Stadium: St Paul's Sports Ground; Attendance: 170

14 November 2021	Milton Keynes Dons (3)	0–2	Ipswich Town (3)	Newport Pagnell
		Report	Battatt 16'; O'Brien 36'	Stadium: Willen Road

14 November 2021	Netherton United (7)	3–2 (a.e.t.)	Knowle (6)	Netherton
	Green 21'; Johnson 35'	Report	15'; 46'	Stadium: The Grange

14 November 2021	New Milton Town (6)	0–4	Bridgwater United (3)	New Milton
		Report	Goddard 9', 22'; Holden 36'; Markham 90'	Stadium: Fawcetts Field; Attendance: 96; Referee: Jordan White

14 November 2021	Newcastle United (4)	5–1	Harrogate Town AFC (5)	Woolsington
	Gibson 12'; Elson 22'; Barker 24', 67', 72'	Report	Eustance 57'	Stadium: Druid Park

14 November 2021	Northampton Town (5)	2–2 (a.e.t.) (4–2 p)	Bedworth United (4)	Harpole
	Cudone; St John Mosse	Report	McGuckin; Webb	Stadium: Harpole Playing Field; Attendance: 276
	Penalties
	Penalty scored		Penalty scored Penalty missed

14 November 2021	Nottingham Forest (3)	4–0	Lichfield City (5)	Eastwood
	Powell 39'; Axten 46'; Moncaster 51'; Anderson 70'	Report		Stadium: Coronation Park

14 November 2021	Portsmouth (3)	13–0	Dorking Wanderers (6)	Havant
	Khassel 10', 12', 44'; De Bunsen 18', 47', 85'; Albuery 23', 45+1', 51', 65'; Bridge 61'; Rowbotham 78'; Quayle 80'	Report		Stadium: Westleigh Park

14 November 2021	Queens Park Rangers (4)	11–0	Bromley (7)	Perivale
	Curr 8', 53', 57'; Grieve 10'; Hall 30', 55', 70', 77'; Searle 50'; Moore 64', 84'	Report		Stadium: Reynolds Field

14 November 2021	Salford City Lionesses (5)	4–0	Alnwick Town (4)	Kersal
	Newhouse 11'; Thornton 13'; Abdullah 65'; Tobin 72'	Report		Stadium: Moor Lane; Attendance: 214

14 November 2021	Sheffield (3)	1–1 (a.e.t.) (4–2 p)	Sutton Coldfield Town (5)	Dronfield
	Evison 18'	Report	Fisher 45+2'	Stadium: Home of Football Ground
	Penalties
	Penalty scored		Penalty scored Penalty missed

14 November 2021	Shifnal Town (6)	0–4	Lincoln United (5)	Shifnal
		Report	Churcher 25'; Farrow 29'; Barai 53'; Murrell 84'	Stadium: Acoustafoam Stadium

14 November 2021	Shrewsbury Town (6)	1–2	Lye Town (5)	Shrewsbury
	Veitch 42'	Report	Slaim 11'; Johnson 69'	Stadium: New Meadow; Attendance: 543

14 November 2021	Solihull Moors (4)	0–3	Loughborough Lightning (3)	Solihull
		Report	Russell 16', 90+4'; Wilson 90'	Stadium: Damson Park; Referee: J. Coyle

14 November 2021	South Shields (5)	1–4	Norton & Stockton Ancients (4)	West Harton
	62'	Report	Tierney 33'; Owens 47', 61' (pen.), 70'	Stadium: Harton & Westoe Miners Welfare Stadium

14 November 2021	Southampton (3)	1–0	Swindon Town (4)	Totton
	Kendall 23'	Report		Stadium: Testwood Stadium; Attendance: 238; Referee: Kelvin Bagot

14 November 2021	Sporting Khalsa (4)	1–7	Wolverhampton Wanderers (3)	Willenhall
	Cann 6'	Report	George 45+2', 79'; Hughes 45+3', 56', 63', 90+1'; Price 69'	Stadium: Guardian Warehousing Arena; Attendance: 150

14 November 2021	Steyning Town Community (7)	0–3	Kent Football United (4)	Steyning
		Report	Goal	Stadium: The Shooting Field

14 November 2021	Stoke City (3)	5–3	Doncaster Rovers Belles (4)	Stockton-on-Tees
	Knight 25', 39', 86'; Hudson 54'; 59' (o.g.)	Report	Saxton 10'; Sneddon 57'; McWilliams 74'	Stadium: Norton Sports Complex

14 November 2021	Sutton United (6)	0–6	Ashford Town (Middlesex) (5)	Sutton
		Report	Down 38'; Farrell 44'; Cheatley 55', 88', 90'; Neufville 65'	Stadium: Gander Green Lane

14 November 2021	Wakefield Trinity (5)	1–4	AFC Fylde (3)	Featherstone
	Renwick 47'	Report	Merrin 16'; Mortimer 19'; Forster 44'; McCoy 90'	Stadium: Post Office Road; Attendance: 184

14 November 2021	Worthing (5)	1–1 (a.e.t.) (3–4 p)	Hounslow (3)	Worthing
	Worsforld 5'	Report	Waithe 53'	Stadium: The Crucial Environmental Stadium
	Penalties
	Penalty scored Penalty missed		Penalty scored

14 November 2021	Wymondham Town (5)	0–2	Norwich City (4)	Wymondham
		Report	Parsons 25'; Snelling 60'	Stadium: Ketts Park

== Second round proper ==
28 matches were played in the second round proper in November 2021, made up of the 56 winning teams from the first round proper and did not include the introduction of any new teams.

Number of teams per tier still in competition
Super League	Championship	Premier Division	Division One	Regional & County	Total
12 / 12	12 / 12	21 / 27	23 / 35	12 / 50	80 / 136

28 November 2021	AFC Fylde (3)	2–3	Burnley (3)	Warton
	Holbrook 61'; Hughes 74'	Report	Ravening 21'; Thomas 30'; Hamer 33'	Stadium: Kellamergh Park

28 November 2021	Ashford Town (Middlesex) (5)	3–0	Oxford United (3)	Stanwell
	Cheatley 10'; Neufville 63'; Down 82'	Report		Stadium: Robert Parker Stadium

28 November 2021	Cambridge City (4)	1–2	Stourbridge (5)	Ely
	Stanley 68'	Report	Moran 13'; Tomlinson 35' (o.g.)	Stadium: The Demcom Stadium; Attendance: 275; Referee: Joseph Karram

28 November 2021	Cheltenham Town (4)	3–3 (5–6 p)	Southampton Women (4)	Cirencester
	Jones 32'; Liggett 45+1', 101'	Report	Heslam 14'; Wylie 59'; Okoro 103'	Stadium: Corinium Stadium; Referee: Roger Smith
	Penalties
	Penalty scored Penalty missed		Penalty scored

28 November 2021	Chichester & Selsey (3)	0–3	Bridgwater United (3)	Selsey
		Report	Hinchliffe 51', 59'; Goddard 90'	Stadium: The High Street Ground; Attendance: 90; Referee: Rado Iliev

28 November 2021	Eastleigh In The Community (5)	0–5	Exeter City (4)	Eastleigh
		Report	Stacey 14', 19', 58'; Kaptein 53'; Pengelly 67'	Stadium: Ten Acres; Attendance: 208

28 November 2021	Gillingham (3)	2–0	Actonians (4)	Strood
	Parreno 55'; Parker 82'	Report		Stadium: Rochester United Sports Ground
Note: Match abandoned in 88th minute on medical grounds. The FA later confirmed Gillingham's victory.

28 November 2021	Hashtag United (4)	0–1	AFC Wimbledon (4)	Canvey Island
		Report	Hincks 90'	Stadium: Park Lane; Referee: Samuel Everitt

28 November 2021	Hounslow (3)	0–0 (a.e.t.) (1–3 p)	Clapton Community (7)	Hanworth
		Report		Stadium: Rectory Meadow; Attendance: 476
	Penalties
	Penalty missed Penalty scored		(penalty scored) Bioro; (penalty missed) Marino; (penalty scored) Link; (penalty scored) Lyons

28 November 2021	Hull City (3)	1–2	Liverpool Feds (4)	Kingston upon Hull
	K. Thompson 62'	Report	C. Thompson 20'; Rogers 87'	Stadium: Haworth Park; Attendance: 70

28 November 2021	Ilminster Town (5)	0–7	Southampton (3)	Ilminster
		Report	Pharoah 33'; Rutherford 44', 89'; Freeland 50', 78'; Bedwell 54'; Morris 65'	Stadium: Archie Gooch Pavilion; Attendance: 312

28 November 2021	Long Eaton United (4)	6–0	Netherton United (7)	Long Eaton
	10'; 14'; 22'; 26'	Report		Stadium: Grange Park
Note: Match abandoned in 80th minute due to adverse weather conditions. The FA later confirmed Long Eaton's victory.

28 November 2021	Plymouth Argyle (3)	4–2	AFC St Austell (5)	Saltash
	Alphous 28'; Ireland 29', 79'; Rose 59'	Report	Thornton 60'; Solloway 70'	Stadium: Kimberley Stadium; Attendance: 154; Referee: L McFarlane

28 November 2021	Portsmouth (3)	2–1	AFC Bournemouth (4)	Havant
	Albuery 2'; Gane 37'	Report	Cooper 8'	Stadium: Westleigh Park

28 November 2021	Queens Park Rangers (4)	0–3	Billericay Town (4)	Perivale
		Report	May 6', 87'; Jeffkins 86'	Stadium: Powerday Stadium

28 November 2021	Salford City Lionesses (5)	0–4	Newcastle United (4)	Kersal
		Report	Gibson 41'; Barker 69', 73'; Elson 78'	Stadium: Moor Lane

28 November 2021	Stevenage (4)	0–2	Loughborough Lightning (3)	Letchworth
		Report	Petley 38'; Wilson 61'	Stadium: Pixmore Pitches; Attendance: 130

28 November 2021	West Bromwich Albion (3)	4–1	Lincoln United (5)	Sutton Coldfield
	Stamps 8'; Gallop 17'; Greaves 68'; Walklett 81'	Report	Smith 56'	Stadium: Coles Lane

5 December 2021	Brighouse Town (3)	8–0	Farsley Celtic (5)	Brighouse
	Embley 30', 72', 83', 86'; Fields 35', 41'; Woodruff 50', 90'	Report		Stadium: Yorkshire Payments Stadium; Attendance: 116

5 December 2021	Chorley (4)	5–0	Bradford City (4)	Leigh
	Worth 37'; Cleary 45', 75'; Collins 54', 77'	Report		Stadium: The Pavillion; Attendance: 50

5 December 2021	Ipswich Town (3)	4–0	Crawley Wasps (3)	Felixstowe
	Thomas 50'; Egan 65'; Gibson 67' (o.g.); Barratt 90+1'	Report		Stadium: The Goldstar Ground

5 December 2021	Kent Football United (4)	1–6	Chesham United (4)	Dartford
	Burrows 39'	Report	Fraser 8', 25', 58'; Farrow 17', 30', 52'	Stadium: Glentworth Sports Club; Attendance: 91

5 December 2021	Leafield Athletic (4)	2–3	Lincoln City (4)	Solihull
	45'; 52'	Report	Rousseau 59', 81'; Blinkhorn 66'	Stadium: Dickens Heath Sports Club

5 December 2021	Lye Town (5)	1–2	Northampton Town (5)	Halesowen
	Johnson 59'	Report	Cudone 80'; Partridge 90+5'	Stadium: Grove Recreation Ground

5 December 2021	Norton & Stockton Ancients (4)	1–2	Leeds United (4)	Stockton-on-Tees
	Reed 39'	Report	Nolan 4'; Smith 89'	Stadium: Norton Sports Complex; Attendance: 200

5 December 2021	Sheffield (3)	0–3	Huddersfield Town (3)	Dronfield
		Report	Crossman 58'; 70' (o.g.); Sanderson 90+1'	Stadium: Home of Football Ground

5 December 2021	Stoke City (3)	5–1	Norwich City (4)	Smallthorne
	Kivel 8'; Hall 20', 83'; Bedeau 44'; Miszkiel 90'	Report	Symonds 54'	Stadium: Emerys Stadium

5 December 2021	Wolverhampton Wanderers (3)	0–4	Nottingham Forest (3)	Wolverhampton
		Report	Moncaster 19'; Powell 51'; Reynolds 66'; Middleton 90'	Stadium: CKW Stadium; Attendance: 260

== Third round proper ==
20 matches were played in the third round proper in December 2021, made up of the 28 winning teams from the second round proper and included the introduction of 12 teams from the second-tier FA Women's Championship.

Number of teams per tier still in competition
Super League	Championship	Premier Division	Division One	Regional & County	Total
12 / 12	12 / 12	13 / 24	11 / 35	4 / 53	52 / 136

12 December 2021	AFC Wimbledon (4)	0–2	Ipswich Town (3)	Wimbledon
		Report	Thomas 18', 58'	Stadium: Plough Lane; Attendance: 405

12 December 2021	Ashford Town (Middlesex) (5)	1–6	London City Lionesses (2)	Stanwell
	Neufville 35'	Report	Jarrett 11'; Fronc 39'; Nunn 50'; Rossiter 69'; Cotter 81' (o.g.); Rouse 88'	Stadium: Robert Parker Stadium; Attendance: 74

12 December 2021	Bridgwater United (3)	1–0	Crystal Palace (2)	Bridgwater
	Holden 45'	Report		Stadium: Fairfax Park; Attendance: 284; Referee: Billy Wilde

12 December 2021	Brighouse Town (3)	0–1	Sunderland AFC (2)	Brighouse
		Report	Scarr 65'	Stadium: Yorkshire Payments Stadium; Attendance: 212

12 December 2021	Bristol City (2)	5–0	Lewes (2)	Long Ashton
	Harrison 28', 52'; Beever-Jones 46'; Bull 57'; Morgan 65'	Report		Stadium: Robins High Performance Centre; Attendance: 313

12 December 2021	Burnley (3)	0–4	Liverpool (2)	Leyland
		Report	Furness 37', 56'; Fahey 77'; Lawley 87'	Stadium: County Ground; Referee: Zeyad Ahmed

12 December 2021	Chesham United (4)	0–10	Billericay Town (4)	Chesham
		Report	Drewe 10'; May 11', 26', 33'; Jones 14', 47'; Morton 57', 82'; Rushen 59', 86'	Stadium: The Meadow

12 December 2021	Chorley (4)	0–3	Newcastle United (4)	Burscough
		Report	Gibson 31', 40'; Elson 35'	Stadium: Victoria Park; Attendance: 110

12 December 2021	Huddersfield Town (3)	3–1	Loughborough Lightning (3)	Shelley
	Sanderson 48', 90+3'; Elford 89'	Report	Steele 54'	Stadium: Stafflex Arena

12 December 2021	Leeds United (4)	0–6	Durham (2)	Tadcaster
		Report	Galloway 35', 52'; Lambert 39', 67'; Hepple 45', 70'	Stadium: Global Stadium; Attendance: 131

12 December 2021	Lincoln City (4)	4–2 (a.e.t.)	Northampton Town (5)	Lincoln
	3' (o.g.); Rousseau 90', 95', 115'	Report	Brewin 40'; Dicks 74'	Stadium: The Moorlands Railway Sports & Social Club

12 December 2021	Liverpool Feds (4)	0–1	Blackburn Rovers (2)	Aigburth
		Report	Jordan 71'	Stadium: Jericho Lane

12 December 2021	Plymouth Argyle (3)	5–0	Clapton Community (7)	Saltash
	Knapman 8'; Cunningham 51'; Pollock 60'; Rose 81'; Crawford 90'	Report		Stadium: Kimberley Stadium; Attendance: 231

12 December 2021	Portsmouth (3)	1–2	Southampton (3)	Havant
	Khassal 31'	Report	Kendall 65'; Morris 112'	Stadium: Westleigh Park; Attendance: 387

12 December 2021	Stoke City (3)	1–2	Nottingham Forest (3)	Smallthorne
	Barber 21'	Report	Brown 56'; Anderson 77'	Stadium: Emerys Builders Merchants Stadium

12 December 2021	Stourbridge (5)	0–3	Sheffield United (2)	Amblecote
		Report	Sweetman-Kirk 2'; Enderby 23'; Newsham 65'	Stadium: War Memorial Athletic Ground; Attendance: 402; Referee: Simon Kavanagh

12 December 2021	Watford (2)	0–4	Coventry United (2)	Kings Langley
		Report	Wilkinson 20', 66'; Morris 59'; Hardy 83'	Stadium: Orbital Fasteners Stadium

12 December 2021	West Bromwich Albion (3)	5–1	Long Eaton United (4)	Sutton Coldfield
	Gallop 2', 30'; Dugmore 45'; Walklett 57', 79'	Report	Hicks 64'	Stadium: Coles Lane; Attendance: 72

19 December 2021	Gillingham (3)	0–1	Charlton Athletic (2)	Strood
		Report	Olding 40'	Stadium: Rochester United Sports Ground; Attendance: 85; Referee: Marcin Indyk

19 December 2021	Southampton Women (4)	0–3	Exeter City (4)	New Alresford
		Report	Pengelly 34', 45'; Stacey 47'	Stadium: Alrebury Park

== Fourth round proper ==
16 matches were played in the fourth round proper on 29 and 30 January 2022, made up of the 20 winning teams from the third round proper and included the introduction of 12 teams from the first-tier FA Women's Super League. The fourth round proper was the final round to introduce new teams.

Number of teams per tier still in competition
Super League	Championship	Premier Division	Division One	Regional & County	Total
12 / 12	9 / 12	7 / 27	4 / 35	0 / 50	32 / 136

29 January 2022	Nottingham Forest (3)	0–8	Manchester City (1)	West Bridgford
13:00		Report	Weir 2'; Shaw 34', 69'; Angeldal 43'; Stanway 50', 71', 90+2'; Hemp 53'	Stadium: City Ground; Attendance: 3,994

29 January 2022	Aston Villa (1)	1–3	Chelsea (1)	Walsall
13:00	Petzelberger 90+5' (pen.)	Report	Reiten 18', 62'; Harder 28' (pen.)	Stadium: Bescot Stadium; Attendance: 1,093; Referee: Abigail Byrne

30 January 2022	Arsenal (1)	1–0	London City Lionesses (2)	Borehamwood
12:30	Miedema 44'	Report 1 Report 2		Stadium: Meadow Park; Attendance: 1,100

30 January 2022	Southampton (3)	1–0 (a.e.t.)	Bristol City (2)	Southampton
13:00	Morris 91'	Report		Stadium: St Mary's Stadium; Attendance: 3,638

30 January 2022	Plymouth Argyle (3)	0–6	Charlton Athletic (2)	Plymouth
13:00		Report	Roe 59'; Fox 65'; Roche 69'; Robinson 78'; Sampson 84'; Ross 90'	Stadium: Home Park; Attendance: 469

30 January 2022	Brighton & Hove Albion (1)	2–3	Reading (1)	Crawley
13:00	Koivisto 64'; Green 76'	Report	Vanhaevermaet 34'; Rose 51'; Primmer 83'	Stadium: Broadfield Stadium; Attendance: 631

30 January 2022	Durham (2)	3–1	Blackburn Rovers (2)	Durham
13:00	Hepple 31'; Ejupi 37'; Robson 45+1'	Report	Blanchard 60'	Stadium: Maiden Castle; Attendance: 447

30 January 2022	Sheffield United (2)	1–4	West Ham United (1)	Sheffield
13:00	Rayner 6'	Report	Filis 4'; Walker 21', 57'; Brynjarsdóttir 63'	Stadium: Bramall Lane; Attendance: 353

30 January 2022	Birmingham City (1)	2–1 (a.e.t.)	Sunderland (2)	Birmingham
13:00	Sarri 28'; Whipp 100'	Report	Ramshaw 86'	Stadium: St Andrew's; Attendance: 384; Referee: Magda Golba

30 January 2022	Huddersfield Town (3)	0–4	Everton (1)	Huddersfield
13:00		Report	Anvegård 4'; Gauvin 38', 50'; Emslie 89'	Stadium: Kirklees Stadium; Attendance: 1,168

30 January 2022	Newcastle United (4)	0–1	Ipswich Town (3)	Newcastle upon Tyne
14:00		Report	O'Brien 3'	Stadium: Kingston Park; Attendance: 2,754

30 January 2022	Liverpool (2)	6–0	Lincoln City (4)	Birkenhead
14:00	Robe 40', 45', 61' (pen.); Stengel 45+2'; Moore 57'; Wardlaw 77'	Report		Stadium: Prenton Park

30 January 2022	Billericay Town (4)	1–1 (a.e.t.) (2–4 p)	Coventry United (2)	Billericay
14:00	Jones 116' (pen.)	Report	Wilkinson 100'	Stadium: New Lodge; Attendance: 415; Referee: Nicolet Bria
	Penalties
	Jones (penalty scored); Lockett (penalty missed); Stimson (penalty scored); Rushen (penalty missed)		(penalty scored) Wilkinson; (penalty scored) Ferguson; (penalty scored) N'Dow; (penalty scored) Haigh

30 January 2022	West Bromwich Albion (3)	0–0 (a.e.t.) (4–2 p)	Exeter City (4)	Sutton Coldfield
14:00		Report		Stadium: Coles Lane
	Penalties
	George (penalty scored); Embley (penalty scored); Congrave (penalty scored); Stamps (penalty scored)		(penalty missed) Watkins; (penalty scored) Beck; (penalty scored) Taylor; (penalty missed) Britton

30 January 2022	Bridgwater United (3)	0–2	Manchester United (1)	Bridgwater
14:00		Report 1 Report 2	Buxton 17' (o.g.); Toone 82'	Stadium: Fairfax Park; Attendance: 2,500; Referee: Richie Watkins

30 January 2022	Tottenham Hotspur (1)	1–3 (a.e.t.)	Leicester City (1)	Canons Park
14:00	Addison 61'	Report	O'Brien 82'; Howard 91'; De Graaf 120+2'	Stadium: The Hive Stadium; Attendance: 596

== Fifth round proper ==
Eight matches were played in the fifth round proper on 26 and 27 February 2022, made up of the 16 winning teams from the fourth round proper.

Number of teams per tier still in competition
Super League	Championship	Premier Division	Division One	Regional & County	Total
9 / 12	4 / 12	3 / 27	0 / 35	0 / 50	16 / 136

26 February 2022	Chelsea (1)	7–0	Leicester City (1)	Kingston upon Thames
13:00	Harder 24', 36'; Kerr 60', 82'; Ji 65'; Nouwen 79'; England 85'	Report		Stadium: Kingsmeadow; Attendance: 2,723

27 February 2022	Liverpool (2)	0–4	Arsenal (1)	Birkenhead
12:00		Report	Roberts 19' (o.g.); McCabe 31'; Foord 33'; Little 62'	Stadium: Prenton Park; Attendance: 1,851

27 February 2022	Manchester United (1)	1–4	Manchester City (1)	Leigh
12:30	Zelem 13'	Report	Hemp 50'; White 58'; Weir 60'; Shaw 79'	Stadium: Leigh Sports Village; Attendance: 2,335

27 February 2022	Charlton Athletic (2)	0–2	Everton (1)	Bexley
13:00		Report	Dali 34'; Anvegård 74'	Stadium: The Oakwood; Attendance: 457

27 February 2022	Durham (2)	0–1	Birmingham City (1)	Durham
14:00		Report	Lo. Quinn 78'	Stadium: Maiden Castle; Attendance: 593

27 February 2022	West Bromwich Albion (3)	2–4	Coventry United (2)	Sutton Coldfield
14:00	Stamps 31'; Dugmore 77' (pen.)	Report	Mann 6'; Thomas 23'; Wilkinson 45+1'; Fergusson 87'	Stadium: Coles Lane

27 February 2022	Reading (1)	0–1 (a.e.t.)	West Ham United (1)	Reading
14:00		Report	Brynjarsdóttir 105+1'	Stadium: Madejski Stadium

27 February 2022	Ipswich Town (3)	1–1 (a.e.t.) (4–2 p)	Southampton (3)	Felixstowe
14:00	Grey 110'	Report	Rendell 120+1'	Stadium: Goldstar Ground; Attendance: 1,167
	Penalties
	O'Brien (penalty scored); Bryant (penalty scored); Barratt (penalty scored); Peake (penalty scored)		(penalty missed) Kendall; (penalty scored) Parnell; (penalty scored) Rutherford; (penalty missed) Rood

== Quarter-finals ==
Four matches were played in the quarter-finals on 18 and 20 March 2022, made up of the eight winning teams from the fifth round proper.

Number of teams per tier still in competition
Super League	Championship	Premier Division	Division One	Regional & County	Total
6 / 12	1 / 12	1 / 27	0 / 35	0 / 50	8 / 136

18 March 2022	Arsenal (1)	4–0	Coventry United (2)	Borehamwood
19:00	Blackstenius 38'; Mead 59'; Parris 63'; Miedema 77'	Report		Stadium: Meadow Park; Attendance: 761; Referee: Abigail Byrne

20 March 2022	Chelsea (1)	5–0	Birmingham City (1)	Kingston upon Thames
14:00	Eriksson 45'; Spence 55'; England 62', 72'; Charles 65'	Report		Stadium: Kingsmeadow; Attendance: 1,869; Referee: Lucy May

20 March 2022	Manchester City (1)	4–0	Everton (1)	Manchester
12:30	Hemp 35', 48'; Weir 61'; White 90+2'	Report		Stadium: Academy Stadium; Attendance: 1,214; Referee: Lauren Impey

20 March 2022	Ipswich Town (3)	0–1	West Ham United (1)	Felixstowe
12:30		Report	Evans 32'	Stadium: Goldstar Ground; Attendance: 2,000; Referee: Amy Fearn

== Semi-finals ==
Two matches were played in the semi-finals on 16 and 17 April 2022, made up of the four winning teams from the quarter-finals.

Number of teams per tier still in competition
Super League	Championship	Premier Division	Division One	Regional & County	Total
4 / 12	0 / 12	0 / 27	0 / 35	0 / 50	4 / 136

16 April 2022	West Ham United (1)	1–4	Manchester City (1)	Dagenham
12:15	Evans 42'	Report	White 22'; Kelly 37'; Hemp 66', 90+1'	Stadium: Victoria Road; Attendance: 1,565; Referee: Abigail Byrne

17 April 2022	Arsenal (1)	0–2	Chelsea (1)	Borehamwood
12:30		Report	Reiten 50'; Ji 61'	Stadium: Meadow Park; Attendance: 3,458; Referee: Rebecca Welch

== Final ==
The final was played at Wembley Stadium on Sunday 15 May 2022.

15 May 2022
14:30 BST

Chelsea	3–2 (a.e.t.)	Manchester City
Kerr 33', 99'; Cuthbert 63'	Report	Hemp 42'; Raso 89'

Wembley Stadium, London
Attendance: 49,094
Referee: Kirsty Dowle (Kent)

== Television rights ==
Round	Date	Teams	Kick-off	Channels	
Round	Date	Teams	Kick-off	Digital	TV
Fourth round	30 January	Arsenal v London City Lionesses	12:30pm	BBC iPlayer	BBC Red Button
Fifth round	27 February	Liverpool v Arsenal	12:00pm	BBC iPlayer	BBC Red Button
Fifth round	27 February	Manchester United v Manchester City	12:30pm	BBC iPlayer	BBC Two
Quarter-finals	20 March	Ipswich Town v West Ham United	12:30pm	BBC iPlayer	BBC Red Button
Semi-finals	16 April	West Ham United v Manchester City	12:15pm	BBC iPlayer	BBC One
Semi-finals	17 April	Arsenal v Chelsea	12:30pm	BBC iPlayer	BBC Two
Final	15 May	Chelsea v Manchester City	2:30pm	BBC iPlayer	BBC One
