= 2026–27 Manchester City W.F.C. season =

English football club season

Manchester City Women
2026–27 season
- Chairman: Khaldoon Mubarak
- Manager: Andrée Jeglertz
- Stadium: Academy Stadium
Home colours	Away colours	Third colours

The 2026–27 season is Manchester City Women's Football Club's 39th season of competitive football and their fourteenth season in the Women's Super League, the highest level of English women's football. Manchester City enter the season as defending champions in both the WSL and the FA Cup, having completed a domestic double in the previous season.

Due to changes in the competition's format and the club's participation in the UEFA Champions League, Manchester City will not participate in the League Cup for the first time since the 2014 season.

== Pre-season ==
8 August 2026 Friendly	Fiorentina (Italy)	1–1	Manchester City	Florence
19:00	Cherubini 45'	Report	Hemp 88'	Stadium: Viola Park Training Centre

15 August 2026 Friendly	Manchester City	2–2	(Spain) Barcelona	Manchester
16:00	Greenwood 57'; Clinton 67'	Report	Graham Hansen 5'; López 24'	Stadium: Academy Stadium

19 August 2026 Friendly	Arsenal	2–1	Manchester City	London Colney
	Blackstenius; Baum	Report	Hemp	Stadium: Arsenal Training Centre; Attendance: Behind-closed-doors

29 August 2026 Friendly	Manchester City	2–0	Manchester United	Manchester
14:00	Shaw 26'; Beney 85'	Report		Stadium: Academy Stadium; Attendance: Behind-closed-doors

== Competitions ==
=== Women's Super League ===
==== League table ====
Pos	Team	Pld	W	D	L	GF	GA	GD	Pts	Qualification or relegation
1	Chelsea	11	8	3	0	29	5	+24	27	Qualification for the Champions League league phase
2	Manchester City	11	8	1	2	28	14	+14	25	Qualification for the Champions League league phase
3	London City Lionesses	11	7	2	2	31	14	+17	23	Qualification for the Champions League third qualifying round
4	Manchester United	11	6	3	2	14	12	+2	21	
5	Tottenham Hotspur	11	6	2	3	28	19	+9	20	

Updated to match(es) played on 22 November 2026. Source: Women's Super League Table
Rules for classification: 1) Points; 2) Goal difference; 3) Number of goals scored.

==== Results summary ====
Overall								Home						Away					
Pld	W	D	L	GF	GA	GD	Pts	W	D	L	GF	GA	GD	W	D	L	GF	GA	GD
11	8	1	2	28	14	+14	25	5	0	1	20	10	+10	3	1	1	8	4	+4

Last updated: 22 November 2026.
Source: FA WSL

==== Results by matchday ====
Round	1	2	3	4	5	6	7	8	9	10	11	12	13	14	15	16	17	18	19	20	21	22
Ground	H	A	H	A	H	H	A	A	H	A	H											
Result	W	W	W	W	W	W	D	W	W	L	L											
Position	2	1	1	1	1	1	2	2	1	2	2											

Source: FA WSL
A = Away; H = Home; W = Win; D = Draw; L = Loss

==== Matches ====
The league fixtures were released on 30 July 2026.

6 September 2026 1	Manchester City	3–1	Birmingham City	Manchester
14:30 BST	Fowler 49'; Shaw 55', 86'; Mead (yellow card) 83'	Report	Hurtré 90'; Effa Effa (yellow card) 90+3'	Stadium: Academy Stadium; Attendance: 3,560; Referee: Phoebe Cross

13 September 2026 2	Aston Villa	1–4	Manchester City	Birmingham
18:30 BST	Vangsgaard 42'	Report	Rose 14'; Fowler 29'; Shaw 74'; Harviken 90+3' (o.g.)	Stadium: Villa Park; Attendance: 3,079; Referee: Declan Brown

18 September 2026 3	Manchester City	4–2	Liverpool	Manchester
19:00 BST	Hemp 13', 90+5'; Shaw 45+2'; Fisk 90' (o.g.)	Report	Ramos (yellow card) 14'; Bergström 19', (yellow card) 89'; Endemann 29'; Nagano (yellow card) 66'	Stadium: Academy Stadium; Attendance: 3,216; Referee: Grace Lowe

26 September 2026 4	Charlton Athletic	0–1	Manchester City	Charlton
13:30 BST		Report	Greenwood 36'; Coffey (yellow card) 45+2'	Stadium: The Valley; Attendance: 2,147; Referee: Megan Wilson

4 October 2026 5	Manchester City	4–2	Arsenal	Manchester
16:30 BST	Hemp 45+1', 72'; Casparij 63'; Shaw 84'	Report	Baum 43'; Russo 49'; Smith (yellow card) 82'	Stadium: Etihad Stadium; Attendance: 12,360; Referee: Grace Lowe

18 October 2026 6	Manchester City	3–2	Brighton & Hove Albion	Manchester
14:30 BST	Shaw 5', 16'; Charles 17'	Report	García 31'; Hayes 37'; Vanegas (yellow card) 90+4'	Stadium: Academy Stadium; Attendance: 3,141; Referee: Leigh Doughty

25 October 2026 7	Manchester United	1–1	Manchester City	Leigh
18:00 GMT	Sandberg (yellow card) 74'; Le Tissier (yellow card) 83'; Terland 89'	Report	Fowler (yellow card) 28'; Hemp (yellow card) 45+1'; Shaw 66'	Stadium: Leigh Sports Village; Attendance: 5,361; Referee: Kirsty Dowle

1 November 2026 8	London City Lionesses	1–2	Manchester City	Bromley
12:00 GMT	Goodwin (yellow card) 31'; Fernández 72'	Report	Hemp (yellow card) 49', (goal) 74'; Shaw 53'; Knaak (yellow card) 57'	Stadium: Hayes Lane; Attendance: 5,233; Referee: Lisa Benn

7 November 2026 9	Manchester City	5–0	West Ham United	Manchester
12:45 GMT	Knaak (yellow card) 9'; Shaw 38', 53', 74'; Casparij (yellow card) 59'; Fujino 60'; Beney 68'	Report	Asseyi (yellow card) 45+3'	Stadium: Academy Stadium; Referee: Megan Wilson

14 November 2026 10	Chelsea	1–0	Manchester City	Fulham
13:30 GMT	Potter (yellow card) 14'; Baltimore 45+4'	Report	Shaw (yellow card) 47'; Wamser (yellow card) 53'; Yamashita (red card) 75'	Stadium: Stamford Bridge; Attendance: 11,169; Referee: Phoebe Cross

22 November 2026 11	Manchester City	1–3	Tottenham Hotspur	Manchester
12:00 GMT	Shaw 10'; Coffey (yellow card) 90+2'	Report	Blakstad (yellow card) 8'; Dijkstra (yellow card) 27'; Tandberg 40'; Spence (yellow card) 52'; Vinberg 74'; Naz 79'; Summanen (yellow card) 90+1'	Stadium: Academy Stadium; Referee: Abigail Byrne

13 December 2026 12	Crystal Palace	v	Manchester City	Sutton
14:00 GMT				Stadium: Gander Green Lane

20 December 2026 13	Manchester City	v	Everton	Manchester
14:00 GMT				Stadium: Academy Stadium

10 January 2027 14	Manchester City	v	Chelsea	Manchester
14:00 GMT				Stadium: Academy Stadium

20 January 2027 15	Birmingham City	v	Manchester City	Birmingham
19:30 GMT				Stadium: St Andrew's

24 January 2027 16	Manchester City	v	Charlton Athletic	Manchester
14:00 GMT				Stadium: Academy Stadium

30 January 2027 17	Arsenal	v	Manchester City	London
17:30 GMT				Stadium: Emirates Stadium

7 February 2027 18	West Ham United	v	Manchester City	Dagenham
14:00 GMT				Stadium: Victoria Road

14 February 2027 19	Manchester City	v	Manchester United	Manchester
14:30 GMT				Stadium: Etihad Stadium

14 March 2027 20	Manchester City	v	Aston Villa	Manchester
14:00 GMT				Stadium: Academy Stadium

17 March 2027 21	Tottenham Hotspur	v	Manchester City	Leyton
19:30 GMT				Stadium: Brisbane Road

27 March 2027 22	Manchester City	v	Crystal Palace	Manchester
14:00 GMT				Stadium: Academy Stadium

4 April 2027 23	Brighton & Hove Albion	v	Manchester City	Crawley
14:00 BST				Stadium: Broadfield Stadium

30 April 2027 24	Everton	v	Manchester City	Liverpool
19:00 BST				Stadium: Goodison Park

9 May 2027 25	Manchester City	v	London City Lionesses	Manchester
14:00 BST				Stadium: Academy Stadium

22 May 2027 26	Liverpool	v	Manchester City	St Helens
TBC				Stadium: St Helens Stadium

=== FA Cup ===
As a member of the first tier, Manchester City will enter the FA Cup in the fourth round proper.

=== Champions League ===
As winners of the 2025–26 Women's Super League, Manchester City will enter the Champions League in the league phase.

==== League phase ====
22 September 2026 1	Bayern Munich (Germany)	2–2	(England) Manchester City	Unterhaching
17:45	Gwinn 11'; Casparij 28' (o.g.); Amani (yellow card) 70'	Report	Mead 45'; Casparij (yellow card) 52'; Shaw (penalty missed) 62'; Wamser 86'	Stadium: Sportpark Unterhaching; Attendance: 4,291; Referee: Olatz Rivera Olmedo (Spain)

1 October 2026 2	Manchester City (England)	1–1	(Spain) Real Madrid	Manchester
20:00	Shaw 51'	Report	Caicedo 29'	Stadium: Academy Stadium; Attendance: 1,938; Referee: Silvia Gasperotti (Italy)

29 October 2026 3	Manchester City (England)	1–1	(France) Paris Saint-Germain	Manchester
20:00	Greenwood (yellow card) 58'; Shaw 85' (pen.)	Report	Elimbi Gilbert 88'	Stadium: Academy Stadium; Attendance: 2,167; Referee: Alina Pesu (Romania)

10 November 2026 4	Inter Milan (Italy)	1–4	(England) Manchester City	Monza
20:00	Bartoli 24'	Report	Fujino 33', 44'; Casparij 56'; Shimizu (yellow card) 67'; Clinton 70'	Stadium: Stadio Brianteo; Attendance: 2,596; Referee: Marta Huerta de Aza (Spain)

18 November 2026 5	BK Häcken (Sweden)	0–2	(England) Manchester City	Gothenburg
17:45	Ölvestad (yellow card) 11'; Luik (yellow card) 90+5'	Report	Hemp 56'; Shaw 77'	Stadium: Nordic Wellness Arena; Attendance: 3,879; Referee: Michalina Diakow (Poland)

16 December 2026 6	Manchester City (England)	v	Austria Wien
20:00		Report

Pos	Team	Pld	W	D	L	GF	GA	GD	Pts	Qualification
3	(German Football Association) Bayern Munich (T)	5	3	2	0	13	5	+8	11	Advance to the quarter-finals (seeded)
4	(The Football Association) Chelsea (T)	5	3	2	0	4	0	+4	11	Advance to the quarter-finals (seeded)
5	(The Football Association) Manchester City (T)	5	2	3	0	10	5	+5	9 (Note: Ranked based on away goals scored, Manchester City 8, Real Madrid 3)	Advance to the knockout phase play-offs (seeded)
6	(Royal Spanish Football Federation) Real Madrid (T)	5	2	3	0	10	5	+5	9	Advance to the knockout phase play-offs (seeded)
7	(Italian Football Federation) Juventus (T)	5	3	0	2	10	9	+1	9	Advance to the knockout phase play-offs (seeded)

Updated to match(es) played on 19 November 2026. Source: UEFA
Rules for classification: League phase tiebreakers
(T) Qualified, but not yet for the particular phase indicated

== Squad information ==
=== Playing statistics ===
As of 22 November 2026

Starting appearances are listed first, followed by substitute appearances after the + symbol where applicable.

No.	Pos	Nat	Player	Total		WSL		FA Cup		Champions League	
No.	Pos	Nat	Player	Apps	Goals	Apps	Goals	Apps	Goals	Apps	Goals
1	GK	(Scotland) SCO	Eartha Cumings	2	0	1+1	0	0	0	0	0
2	DF	(Japan) JPN	Risa Shimizu	3	0	0+1	0	0	0	0+2	0
4	DF	(Canada) CAN	Jade Rose	15	1	11	1	0	0	4	0
5	DF	(England) ENG	Alex Greenwood	11	1	8	1	0	0	3	0
6	MF	(England) ENG	Grace Clinton	13	1	3+5	0	0	0	3+2	1
7	FW	(England) ENG	Beth Mead	10	1	3+4	0	0	0	2+1	1
8	FW	(Australia) AUS	Mary Fowler	16	2	7+4	2	0	0	3+2	0
9	FW	(Jamaica) JAM	Khadija Shaw	15	16	10+1	13	0	0	3+1	3
10	FW	(Netherlands) NED	Vivianne Miedema	2	0	1+1	0	0	0	0	0
11	FW	(England) ENG	Lauren Hemp	15	6	10	5	0	0	3+2	1
13	DF	(Austria) AUT	Laura Wienroither	0	0	0	0	0	0	0	0
14	GK	(England) ENG	Anna Moorhouse	0	0	0	0	0	0	0	0
17	MF	(United States) USA	Sam Coffey	12	0	3+6	0	0	0	2+1	0
18	DF	(Netherlands) NED	Kerstin Casparij	15	2	5+5	1	0	0	5	1
19	MF	(England) ENG	Laura Blindkilde Brown	16	0	9+2	0	0	0	4+1	0
20	FW	(Japan) JPN	Aoba Fujino	16	3	10+1	1	0	0	5	2
21	DF	(England) ENG	Niamh Charles	6	1	2+2	1	0	0	0+2	0
22	MF	(Germany) GER	Sydney Lohmann	4	0	0+1	0	0	0	0+3	0
24	FW	(Switzerland) SUI	Iman Beney	10	1	4+4	1	0	0	1+1	0
25	MF	(Japan) JPN	Yui Hasegawa	16	0	10+1	0	0	0	4+1	0
27	DF	(Germany) GER	Rebecca Knaak	7	0	4	0	0	0	2+1	0
28	DF	(England) ENG	Gracie Prior	5	0	2+1	0	0	0	2	0
31	GK	(Japan) JPN	Ayaka Yamashita	15	0	10	0	0	0	5	0
37	DF	(Germany) GER	Carlotta Wamser	15	1	8+3	0	0	0	4	1
52	MF	(Republic of Ireland) IRL	Eve O'Carroll	0	0	0	0	0	0	0	0
53	DF	(Wales) WAL	Mayzee Davies	0	0	0	0	0	0	0	0

== Transfers and loans ==
=== Transfers in ===
Date	Position	No.	Player	From club
12 June 2026	FW	7	(England) Beth Mead	(England) Arsenal
10 July 2026	DF	21	(England) Niamh Charles	(England) Chelsea
31 August 2026	DF	37	(Germany) Carlotta Wamser	(Germany) Bayer Leverkusen

=== Loans in ===
Start date	End date	Position	No.	Player	From club
3 September 2026	31 January 2027	GK	14	(England) Anna Moorhouse	(United States) Orlando Pride

=== Transfers out ===
Date	Position	No.	Player	To club
31 May 2026	MF	7	(England) Laura Coombs	Retired
31 May 2026	DF	15	(Spain) Leila Ouahabi	(United States) Chicago Stars FC
31 May 2026	GK	40	(England) Katie Startup	(England) Birmingham City
13 July 2026	GK	35	(England) Khiara Keating	(England) Liverpool
4 August 2026	FW	14	(Brazil) Kerolin	(Spain) Barcelona
17 August 2026	FW	—	(England) Poppy Pritchard	(England) Leicester City
18 August 2026	MF	30	(Japan) Aemu Oyama	(Denmark) HB Køge
25 August 2026	DF	26	(Republic of Ireland) Tara O'Hanlon	(England) Wolverhampton Wanderers

=== Loans out ===
Start date	End date	Position	No.	Player	To club
23 July 2026	30 June 2027	DF	44	(England) Codie Thomas	(England) Nottingham Forest
27 July 2026	30 June 2027	DF	3	(England) Naomi Layzell	(England) Everton
7 August 2026	30 June 2027	FW	46	(England) Lily Murphy	(England) Aston Villa
21 August 2026	30 June 2027	GK	12	(England) Eve Annets	(Scotland) Hibernian
