= 2025 Women's League Cup final =

- Event: 2024–25 Women's League Cup
Chelsea	Manchester City
2	1
- Date: 15 March 2025
- Venue: Pride Park, Derby
- Player of the Match: Millie Bright (Chelsea)
- Referee: Emily Heaslip
- Attendance: 14,187

The 2025 Women's League Cup final was the fourteenth final of the Women's League Cup, England's secondary cup competition for women's football teams and its primary league cup tournament. It took place on 15 March 2025 at Pride Park, and was contested by Chelsea and Manchester City.

Chelsea made their sixth consecutive (and sixth overall) appearance in a League Cup final, having lost the previous three editions. Manchester City were contest their first League Cup Final since 2022, which was also against Chelsea.

Chelsea won the match 2–1 and clinched their third title. Maya Ramirez gave Chelsea an early lead when her saved effort richoted back into her path off Laia Alexandri. Manchester City were able to find an equaliser thanks to a rasping effort from Aoba Fujino. But it was Chelsea who would go on to lift the cup, when Yui Hasegawa's attempt to block Ramirez's cross looped past Ayaka Yamashita and into her own net.

== Route to the final ==
=== Chelsea ===
Round	Opposition	Score
GS	Bye	
QF	Durham (H)	5–0
SF	West Ham United (H)	2–0
Key: (H) = Home; (A) = Away

Chelsea entered the competition at the knockout stage due to their participation in the UEFA Women's Champions League.

In their quarter-final, they were drawn at home to Durham. Aggie Beever-Jones opened the scoring midway through the first half, heading in Ashley Lawrence's deflected cross. Durham were able to hold Chelsea at bay for just over an hour, but once Oriane Jean-François scored with a thunderous volley from the edge of the box, the floodgates opened. Erin Cuthbert converted another Lawrence cross, Guro Reiten scrambled home a corner, and Maika Hamano beat the keeper with a looping cross that flew straight into the net.

In their semi-final, they were drawn at home against West Ham United. Johanna Rytting Kaneryd beat Kinga Szemik at her near post with a stinging drive after just twenty minutes to give Chelsea the lead, and nine minutes later, the Blues' spot in the final was secured. Sjoeke Nüsken pounced on a loose pass in the defence, played a one-two with Reiten, rounded Szemik and slotted the ball into the empty net.

=== Manchester City ===
Round	Opposition	Score
GS	Bye	
QF	Manchester United (A)	1–2
SF	Arsenal (A)	1–2
Key: (H) = Home; (A) = Away

Manchester City entered the competition at the knockout stage due to their participation in the UEFA Women's Champions League.

In their quarter-final, they were drawn away to local rivals Manchester United, who had previously beaten them 4–2 at the Etihad Stadium. They were well on their way to avenging that defeat when Laura Coombs converted Lily Murphy's low cross at the near post. However, Manchester United equalised thanks to Millie Turner's well-executed volley. It would prove to be in vain, however, as on the cusp of half time, Murphy cut inside and curled a brilliant effort from the edge of the box beyond the dive of Phallon Tullis-Joyce.

In their semi-final, they were drawn away to reigning champions Arsenal. Like in the previous round, Manchester City had lost to their opponents in the league days earlier, but once again, they would avenge that defeat. Manchester City took the lead through Mary Fowler with a thumping finish following a barnstorming run from Vivianne Miedema. Arsenal were able to find an equaliser in the second half with a penalty from Mariona Caldentey, and Daphne van Domselaar then saved a penalty from Fowler minutes later. With the game approaching extra-time, Manchester City launched one final attack and Mary Fowler scored the winner from the edge of the box with virtually the last kick of the game.

== Match ==
=== Details ===
15 March 2025
12:15 GMT

Chelsea	2–1	Manchester City
Ramírez 8'; Hasegawa 77' (o.g.)	Report	Fujino 64'

Pride Park Stadium, Derby
Attendance: 14,187
Referee: Emily Heaslip

Chelsea	Manchester City

GK	24	(England) Hannah Hampton
LB	17	(France) Sandy Baltimore		(substituted off) 87'
LCB	14	(Sweden) Nathalie Björn
RCB	4	(England) Millie Bright (c)
RB	22	(England) Lucy Bronze	(yellow card) 50'
LCM	6	(Germany) Sjoeke Nüsken
RCM	8	(Scotland) Erin Cuthbert
LW	10	(England) Lauren James
CAM	9	(United States) Catarina Macario		(substituted off) 74'
RW	19	(Sweden) Johanna Rytting Kaneryd		(substituted off) 74'
FW	7	(Colombia) Mayra Ramírez		(substituted off) 79'
Substitutes:
GK	38	(Jamaica) Becky Spencer
LB	21	(England) Niamh Charles		(substituted on) 87'
MF	12	(Canada) Ashley Lawrence
MF	18	(Netherlands) Wieke Kaptein		(substituted on) 79'
MF	27	(France) Oriane Jean-François
MF	53	(England) Lola Brown
FW	2	(United States) Mia Fishel
FW	23	(Japan) Maika Hamano		(substituted on) 74'
FW	33	(England) Aggie Beever-Jones		(substituted on) 74'
Manager:
(France) Sonia Bompastor

GK	31	(Japan) Ayaka Yamishita
LB	15	(Spain) Leila Ouahabi
LCB	4	(Spain) Laia Aleixandri (c)
RCB	28	(England) Gracie Prior
RB	18	(Netherlands) Kerstin Casparij
LCM	6	(Netherlands) Vivianne Miedema	(yellow card) 43'
CDM	25	(Japan) Yui Hasegawa
RM	10	(Netherlands) Jill Roord
LW	8	(Australia) Mary Fowler
FW	21	(Jamaica) Khadija Shaw	(yellow card) 57'	(substituted off) 81'
RW	20	(Japan) Aoba Fujino		(substituted off) 81'
Substitutes:
GK	35	(England) Khiara Keating
CB	3	(England) Naomi Layzell
RB	13	(Austria) Laura Wienroither
MF	7	(England) Laura Coombs
MF	16	(England) Jess Park		(substituted on) 81'
MF	19	(England) Laura Blindkilde Brown
MF	30	(Japan) Aemu Oyama
FW	14	(Brazil) Kerolin		(substituted on) 81'
FW	46	(England) Lily Murphy
Manager:
(England) Nick Cushing

Player of the match:
Millie Bright (Chelsea)

Assistant referees:

Fourth official:

Match rules

- 90 minutes.
- 30 minutes of extra-time if necessary.
- Penalty shoot-out if scores still level.
- Nine named substitutes.
- Maximum of five substitutions in three stoppages.
