= 2025–26 Manchester City W.F.C. season =

English football club season

Manchester City Women
2025–26 season
- Chairman: Khaldoon Mubarak
- Manager: Andrée Jeglertz
- Stadium: Academy Stadium
- Women's Super League: 1st
- FA Cup: Winners
- League Cup: Semi-finals
- Top goalscorer: League: Khadija Shaw (21); All: Khadija Shaw (27)
- Highest home attendance: 17,520 (vs. Manchester United, 15 November 2025)
- Lowest home attendance: 2,267 (vs. West Ham United, 1 November 2025)
- Average home league attendance: 5,551
- Biggest win: 6–0 v Bournemouth (A) (FA Cup, 18 January 2026); 6–0 v Leicester City (H) (WSL, 13 February 2026)
- Biggest defeat: 1–2 v Chelsea (A) (WSL, 5 September 2025); 0–1 v Chelsea (H) (League Cup, 21 January 2026); 0–1 v Arsenal (A) (WSL, 8 February 2026); 2–3 v Brighton & Hove Albion (WSL, 25 April 2026)
Home colours	Away colours	Third colours

The 2025–26 season was Manchester City Women's Football Club's 38th season of competitive football and their thirteenth season in the Women's Super League, the highest level of English women's football.

Andrée Jeglertz was announced as the team's new head coach on 3 July 2025, beginning work following the conclusion of Denmark's UEFA Euro 2025 campaign.

On 6 May 2026, following Arsenal's draw to Brighton & Hove Albion, Manchester City were confirmed as WSL champions. It was their second overall league title, and their first since the 2016 season. Striker Khadija Shaw won WSL Player of the Season, and the Golden Boot award for the third consecutive time after scoring 21 goals during the season. On 31 May, Manchester City won the Women's FA Cup by defeating Brighton & Hove Albion 4–0 at Wembley in the final, completing the domestic double for the first time in their history.

== Pre-season ==
9 August 2025 Friendly	Manchester City	0–0	Manchester United	Manchester
13:00		Report		Stadium: City Football Academy; Attendance: Behind-closed-doors

26 August 2025 Friendly	Manchester City	4–0	Nottingham Forest	Manchester
	Shaw; Kerolin; Miedema	Report		Stadium: Academy Stadium; Attendance: Behind-closed-doors

== Competitions ==
=== Women's Super League ===
==== Results summary ====
Overall								Home						Away					
Pld	W	D	L	GF	GA	GD	Pts	W	D	L	GF	GA	GD	W	D	L	GF	GA	GD
22	18	1	3	62	19	+43	55	11	0	0	38	8	+30	7	1	3	24	11	+13

Last updated: 16 May 2026.
Source: FA WSL

==== Results by matchday ====
Round	1	2	3	4	5	6	7	8	9	10	11	12	13	14	15	16	17	18	19	20	21	22
Ground	A	H	A	H	H	A	H	A	H	A	H	H	A	H	A	H	A	H	A	A	H	A
Result	L	W	W	W	W	W	W	W	W	W	W	W	W	W	L	W	D	W	W	L	W	W
Position	8	6	4	3	2	2	2	1	1	1	1	1	1	1	1	1	1	1	1	1	1	1

A = Away; H = Home; W = Win; D = Draw; L = Loss

==== Results ====
5 September 2025 1	Chelsea	2–1	Manchester City	Fulham
19:30	Beever-Jones 31'; Hamano 64'	Report	Lohmann (yellow card) 56'; Charles 70' (o.g.)	Stadium: Stamford Bridge; Attendance: 14,182; Referee: Emily Heaslip

12 September 2025 2	Manchester City	2–1	Brighton & Hove Albion	Manchester
19:30	Shaw 58'; Hasegawa 74'	Report	Kirby 14'; Rayner (yellow card) 25'; Rule (yellow card) 85'	Stadium: Academy Stadium; Attendance: 3,136; Referee: Adewunmi Soneye

19 September 2025 3	Tottenham Hotspur	1–5	Manchester City	Leyton
19:30	Grant (yellow card) 46'; Hunt (yellow card) 55'; Tandberg (yellow card) 58'; Holdt 87'	Report	Fujino 23'; Miedema 39'; Casparij 43'; Clinton 80'; Coombs 90+5'	Stadium: Brisbane Road; Attendance: 1,631; Referee: Stacey Fullicks

28 September 2025 4	Manchester City	4–1	London City Lionesses	Manchester
12:00	Miedema 11'; Blindkilde Brown 14'; Shaw 69' (pen.), 89' (pen.); Fujino (yellow card) 90+4'	Report	Parris 19'	Stadium: Academy Stadium; Attendance: 3,341; Referee: Phoebe Cross

4 October 2025 5	Manchester City	3–2	Arsenal	Manchester
12:00	Shaw 36'; Casparij 61'; Beney 88'	Report	Caldentey 46'; Kelly 83'	Stadium: Academy Stadium; Attendance: 4,300; Referee: Melissa Burgin

12 October 2025 6	Liverpool	1–2	Manchester City	Liverpool
14:00	Kapocs 52'	Report	Greenwood (yellow card) 55'; Beney 65'; Fujino 86'	Stadium: Anfield; Attendance: 9,387; Referee: William Davis

1 November 2025 7	Manchester City	1–0	West Ham United	Manchester
12:00	Fujino 26'	Report		Stadium: Academy Stadium; Attendance: 2,267; Referee: Ryan Atkins

9 November 2025 8	Everton	1–2	Manchester City	Liverpool
14:00	Gago 40'; Pacheco (yellow card) 57'; Snoeijs (yellow card) 88'	Report	Miedema 21'; Shaw 54'	Stadium: Goodison Park; Attendance: 3,042; Referee: William Davis

15 November 2025 9	Manchester City	3–0	Manchester United	Manchester
13:30	Knaak 26', (yellow card) 29'; Shaw 43'; Hemp 45+2'	Report	Janssen (yellow card) 22'	Stadium: City of Manchester Stadium; Attendance: 17,520; Referee: Grace Lowe

7 December 2025 10	Leicester City	0–3	Manchester City	Leicester
12:00		Report	Shaw 74', 83'; Kerolin 90+4'	Stadium: King Power Stadium; Attendance: 2,345; Referee: Phoebe Cross

14 December 2025 11	Manchester City	6–1	Aston Villa	Manchester
11:55	Shaw 37', 45+2', 84', 90+4'; Knaak (yellow card) 56'; Fujino 62'; Miedema 73'	Report	Parker 70'	Stadium: Academy Stadium; Attendance: 2,711; Referee: Kirsty Dowle

11 January 2026 12	Manchester City	2–0	Everton	Manchester
12:00	Kerolin 26'; Miedema 63'; Greenwood (yellow card) 74'	Report		Stadium: Academy Stadium; Attendance: 2,833; Referee: Adewunmi Soneye

25 January 2026 13	London City Lionesses	1–2	Manchester City	Bromley
11:55	Pattinson (yellow card) 64'; Godfrey 68'	Report	Knaak (yellow card) 6'; Kerolin 11'; Shaw 86'	Stadium: Hayes Lane; Attendance: 3,418; Referee: Lisa Benn

1 February 2026 14	Manchester City	5–1	Chelsea	Manchester
14:30	Kerolin 13', 49', 54'; Shaw 36'; Miedema 72'	Report	Thompson 68'	Stadium: City of Manchester Stadium; Attendance: 13,228; Referee: Melissa Burgin

8 February 2026 15	Arsenal	1–0	Manchester City	Holloway
12:00	Smith 17'; Van Domselaar (yellow card) 80'	Report		Stadium: Emirates Stadium; Attendance: 39,155; Referee: Abigail Byrne

13 February 2026 16	Manchester City	6–0	Leicester City	Manchester
19:00	Shaw 22'; Miedema 28', 36'; Hasegawa 38'; Kerolin 48'; Fujino 66'	Report	Neville (yellow card) 62'	Stadium: Academy Stadium; Attendance: 2,276; Referee: William Davis

15 March 2026 17	Aston Villa	0–0	Manchester City	Aston
11:55	Wilms (yellow card) 88'	Report	Greenwood (yellow card) 22'; Casparij (yellow card) 57'	Stadium: Villa Park; Attendance: 3,388; Referee: Phoebe Cross

21 March 2026 18	Manchester City	5–2	Tottenham Hotspur	Manchester
12:00	Shaw 8', 18', 21'; Kerolin 37'; Nildén 45' (o.g.)	Report	Holdt 15'; Wijk (yellow card) 56'; England 85'	Stadium: Academy Stadium; Attendance: 4,575; Referee: Abigail Byrne

28 March 2026 19	Manchester United	0–3	Manchester City	Trafford
13:30		Report	Miedema 17', 19'; Knaak (yellow card) 47'; Casparij 49'	Stadium: Old Trafford; Attendance: 24,983; Referee: Kirsty Dowle

25 April 2026 20	Brighton & Hove Albion	3–2	Manchester City	Crawley
12:00	Rule (yellow card) 14'; Haley 45+2', 65'; Seike 47'; Kirby (yellow card) 61'	Report	Kerolin 5', (yellow card) 29'; Shaw 86'	Stadium: Broadfield Stadium; Attendance: 2,262; Referee: Megan Wilson

3 May 2026 21	Manchester City	1–0	Liverpool	Manchester
12:00	Greenwood (yellow card) 32'; Coffey (yellow card) 42'; Knaak 90+1'	Report	Nagano (yellow card) 51'; Holland (yellow card) 71'	Stadium: Academy Stadium; Attendance: 4,869; Referee: Kirsty Dowle

16 May 2026 22	West Ham United	1–4	Manchester City	Dagenham
14:00	Piubel 62'	Report	Rose 13'; Fujino (yellow card) 49'; Shaw 57', 72'; Coombs 80'	Stadium: Victoria Road; Attendance: 2,774; Referee: Grace Lowe

==== League table ====
Pos	Team	Pld	W	D	L	GF	GA	GD	Pts	Qualification or relegation
1	Manchester City (C)	22	18	1	3	62	19	+43	55	Qualification for the Champions League league phase
2	Arsenal	22	15	6	1	53	14	+39	51	Qualification for the Champions League league phase
3	Chelsea	22	15	4	3	44	20	+24	49	Qualification for the Champions League third qualifying round
4	Manchester United	22	11	7	4	38	22	+16	40	
5	Tottenham Hotspur	22	11	3	8	35	38	−3	36	

Source: WSL League Table
Rules for classification: 1) Points; 2) Goal difference; 3) Number of goals scored.
(C) Champions

=== FA Cup ===
As a member of the first tier, Manchester City entered the FA Cup in the fourth round proper.

18 January 2026 Fourth round	Bournemouth	0–6	Manchester City	Totton
13:00	Wilson (yellow card) 35'	Report	Shaw 19'; Hemp 40'; Coombs 43', 44'; Miedema 58', 85'	Stadium: Snows Stadium; Attendance: 2,089; Referee: Sophie Dennington

22 February 2026 Fifth round	Manchester City	4–0	Sheffield United	Manchester
14:00	Hemp 7', 11'; Fujino 21'; Coombs 90+3'	Report	Guyatt (yellow card) 90'	Stadium: Academy Stadium; Attendance: 2,800; Referee: Alice Parker

6 April 2026 Quarter-final	Birmingham City	0–1	Manchester City	Birmingham
17:00		Report	Shaw 8'	Stadium: St Andrew's; Attendance: 2,607; Referee: Grace Lowe

10 May 2026 Semi-final	Chelsea	2–3 (a.e.t.)	Manchester City	Fulham
15:30	Cuthbert 8'; Kerr 59'; James (yellow card) 79'	Report	Fowler 86'; Shaw 90+1', 103'; Fujino (yellow card) 97'	Stadium: Stamford Bridge; Attendance: 7,773; Referee: Phoebe Cross

31 May 2026 Final	Brighton & Hove Albion	0–4	Manchester City	London
15:00		Report	Shaw 38'; Greenwood 45+6'; Knaak (yellow card) 54'; Fujino 66'; Miedema 87'	Stadium: Wembley Stadium; Attendance: 43,917; Referee: Melissa Burgin

=== League Cup ===
As a result of not being involved in the UEFA Champions League, Manchester City entered the League Cup at the group stage.

Group stage

24 September 2025 Group stage	Manchester City	3–1	Everton	Manchester
19:00	Rose 21'; Hasegawa 53'; Miedema 76'; Beney (yellow card) 86'	Report	Mace (yellow card) 66'; Kitagawa 82'	Stadium: Academy Stadium; Attendance: 1,350; Referee: Sophie Dennington

19 October 2025 Group stage	Newcastle United	3–3 (6–7 p)	Manchester City	Gateshead
14:00	Joel 11'; Boddy (yellow card) 45'; Gregory 82'; Hayles 90+1'	Report	Coombs 45+3'; Hasegawa 47'; Ouahabi (yellow card) 60'; Prior 63'; Greenwood (yellow card) 84'	Stadium: Gateshead International Stadium; Attendance: 3,012; Referee: Stacey Fullicks
	Penalties
	Hayles (penalty scored); Mannion (penalty scored); Lumsden (penalty scored); Murphy (penalty scored); Nobbs (penalty scored); Gregory (penalty scored); Stokes (penalty missed)		Casparij (penalty scored); Hasegawa (penalty scored); Shaw (penalty scored); Greenwood (penalty scored); Miedema (penalty scored); Ouahabi (penalty scored); Blindkilde Brown (penalty scored)

22 November 2025 Group stage	Nottingham Forest	0–2	Manchester City	West Bridgford
14:00		Report	Clinton 32'; Hemp 38'	Stadium: City Ground; Attendance: 2,624; Referee: Lauren Impey

Pos	Team	Pld	W	PW	PL	L	GF	GA	GD	Pts	Qualification
1	Manchester City	3	2	1	0	0	8	4	+4	8	Advanced to knockout stage
2	Everton	3	1	1	0	1	5	5	0	5	
3	Nottingham Forest	3	1	0	1	1	3	4	−1	4	
4	Newcastle United	3	0	0	1	2	5	8	−3	1	

Source: Women's League Cup
Rules for classification: 1) Points; 2) Goal difference; 3) Number of goals scored; 4) Number of wins; 5) Head-to-head record

==== Knockout stage ====
21 December 2025 Quarter-final	West Ham United	1–5	Manchester City	Dagenham
13:00	Ueki 26'; Tysiak (yellow card) 29'; Hanshaw (yellow card) 55'	Report	Kerolin 3'; Hemp 8'; Clinton 42'; Shaw 55'; Coombs 75'	Stadium: Victoria Road; Referee: Adewunmi Soneye

21 January 2026 Semi-final	Manchester City	0–1	Chelsea	Manchester
19:00	Casparij (yellow card) 80'	Report	Bronze (yellow card) 21'; Kaptein 41'	Stadium: Academy Stadium; Attendance: 1,967; Referee: Phoebe Cross

== Squad information ==
=== Playing statistics ===
As of 31 May 2026

Starting appearances are listed first, followed by substitute appearances after the + symbol where applicable.

No.	Pos	Nat	Player	Total		WSL		FA Cup		League Cup	
No.	Pos	Nat	Player	Apps	Goals	Apps	Goals	Apps	Goals	Apps	Goals
1	GK	(Scotland) SCO	Eartha Cumings	3	0	1	0	0	0	2	0
3	DF	(England) ENG	Naomi Layzell	5	0	0+3	0	0	0	2	0
4	DF	(Canada) CAN	Jade Rose	29	2	19+1	1	4	0	5	1
5	DF	(England) ENG	Alex Greenwood	27	1	17+1	0	4+1	1	1+3	0
6	MF	(England) ENG	Grace Clinton	20	3	2+10	1	4	0	4	2
7	MF	(England) ENG	Laura Coombs	20	7	0+10	2	2+3	3	3+2	2
8	FW	(Australia) AUS	Mary Fowler	9	1	1+4	0	1+3	1	0	0
9	FW	(Jamaica) JAM	Khadija Shaw	32	27	22	21	4+1	5	5	1
10	FW	(Netherlands) NED	Vivianne Miedema	25	14	19	10	0+2	3	1+3	1
11	FW	(England) ENG	Lauren Hemp	26	6	17+1	1	5	3	3	2
13	DF	(Austria) AUT	Laura Wienroither	3	0	0+1	0	0	0	0+2	0
14	FW	(Brazil) BRA	Kerolin	19	10	9+6	9	2+1	0	1	1
15	DF	(Spain) ESP	Leila Ouahabi	23	0	11+4	0	4	0	4	0
17	MF	(United States) USA	Sam Coffey	10	0	5+3	0	2	0	0	0
18	DF	(Netherlands) NED	Kerstin Casparij	29	3	21	3	2+2	0	3+1	0
19	MF	(England) ENG	Laura Blindkilde Brown	29	1	18+2	1	4	0	3+2	0
20	FW	(Japan) JPN	Aoba Fujino	22	7	13+3	5	2+2	2	1+1	0
22	MF	(Germany) GER	Sydney Lohmann	15	0	1+9	0	0+3	0	2	0
24	FW	(Switzerland) SUI	Iman Beney	25	2	5+11	2	3+1	0	2+3	0
25	MF	(Japan) JPN	Yui Hasegawa	29	4	20	2	4	0	5	2
27	DF	(Germany) GER	Rebecca Knaak	21	2	14	2	2+2	0	3	0
28	DF	(England) ENG	Gracie Prior	12	1	5+2	0	1+1	0	2+1	1
31	GK	(Japan) JPN	Ayaka Yamashita	20	0	17	0	1	0	2	0
35	GK	(England) ENG	Khiara Keating	9	0	4	0	4	0	1	0
40	GK	(England) ENG	Katie Startup	0	0	0	0	0	0	0	0
44	DF	(England) ENG	Codie Thomas	1	0	0	0	0	0	0+1	0
46	FW	(England) ENG	Lily Murphy	5	0	1	0	0+3	0	0+1	0
52	MF	(Republic of Ireland) IRL	Eve O'Carroll	0	0	0	0	0	0	0	0
53	DF	(Wales) WAL	Mayzee Davies	0	0	0	0	0	0	0	0
62	MF	(Russia) RUS	Samira Shikhshabekova	0	0	0	0	0	0	0	0

== Transfers and loans ==
=== Transfers in ===
Date	Position	No.	Player	From club
18 June 2025	DF	4	(Canada) Jade Rose	(United States) Harvard Crimson
22 June 2025	FW	24	(Switzerland) Iman Beney	(Switzerland) Young Boys
9 July 2025	MF	22	(Germany) Sydney Lohmann	(Germany) Bayern Munich
8 August 2025	GK	1	(Scotland) Eartha Cumings	(Sweden) FC Rosengård
15 August 2025	DF	13	(Austria) Laura Wienroither	(England) Arsenal
4 September 2025	MF	6	(England) Grace Clinton	(England) Manchester United
14 January 2026	MF	17	(United States) Sam Coffey	(United States) Portland Thorns

=== Transfers out ===
Date	Position	No.	Player	To club
10 May 2025	DF	4	(Spain) Laia Aleixandri	(Spain) Barcelona
24 May 2025	MF	10	(Netherlands) Jill Roord	(Netherlands) Twente
30 June 2025	FW	9	(England) Chloe Kelly	(England) Arsenal
4 September 2025	FW	16	(England) Jess Park	(England) Manchester United

=== Loans out ===
Start date	End date	Position	No.	Player	To club
5 August 2025	31 December 2025	MF	30	(Japan) Aemu Oyama	(Sweden) FC Rosengård
4 September 2025	31 December 2025	DF	26	(Republic of Ireland) Tara O'Hanlon	(England) Sunderland
4 September 2025	15 January 2026	FW	17	(England) Poppy Pritchard	(England) Durham
4 September 2025	30 June 2026	GK	12	(England) Eve Annets	(England) Crystal Palace
4 September 2025	30 June 2026	DF	2	(Japan) Risa Shimizu	(England) Liverpool
28 September 2025	16 November 2025	GK	40	(England) Katie Startup (Note: Emergency goalkeeper loan)	(England) Everton
23 January 2026	30 June 2026	FW	17	(England) Poppy Pritchard	(Scotland) Celtic
23 January 2026	30 June 2026	DF	26	(Republic of Ireland) Tara O'Hanlon	(Scotland) Celtic
