= 2024–25 Manchester City W.F.C. season =

Manchester City Women
2024–25 season
- Chairman: Khaldoon Al Mubarak
- Manager: Gareth Taylor (until 10 March); Nick Cushing (interim, from 10 March)
- Stadium: Academy Stadium
- Women's Super League: 4th
- FA Cup: Semi-finals
- League Cup: Runners-up
- UEFA Champions League: Quarter-finals
- Top goalscorer: League: Khadija Shaw (12); All: Khadija Shaw (19)
- Highest home attendance: 22,497 (vs. Manchester United, 19 January)
- Lowest home attendance: 2,699 (vs. Leicester City, 8 December)
- Average home league attendance: 6,536
- Biggest win: 5–0 v Paris FC (A) (UEFA Champions League qualifiers, 18 September 2024)
- Biggest defeat: 0–3 v Barcelona (A) (UEFA Champions League, 18 December 2024); 0–3 v Chelsea (A) (UEFA Champions League, 27 March 2025)
Home colours	Away colours	Third colours

The 2024–25 season was Manchester City Women's Football Club's 37th season of competitive football and their twelfth season in the Women's Super League, the highest level of English women's football.

Gareth Taylor was sacked from his position as head coach on 10 March 2025, ending a spell of 4 years, 286 days in charge. Former head coach Nick Cushing returned to the role, having left in February 2020 to join New York City FC, on an interim basis until the end of the season.

== Pre-season ==
Manchester City participated in the inaugural Perth International Football Cup invitational friendly as part of preseason.

28 August 2024 Perth Cup; Semi-final	Manchester City	0–0 (4–3 p)	Leicester City	Perth, Australia
		Report		Stadium: Perth Rectangular
	Penalties
	Shaw (penalty scored); Fowler (penalty scored); Fujino (penalty scored); Hasegawa (penalty missed); Miedema (penalty scored)		(penalty missed) Momiki; (penalty scored) Petermann; (penalty missed) Howard; (penalty scored) Takarada; (penalty scored) Rose

1 September 2024 Perth Cup; Final	Manchester City	0–1	(France) Paris Saint-Germain	Perth, Australia
		Report	Echegini 88' (pen.)	Stadium: Perth Stadium

7 September 2024 Friendly	Liverpool	1–2	Manchester City	West Derby
13:00 BST	Höbinger	Report	Hemp; Park	Stadium: Melwood

14 September 2024 Friendly	Aston Villa	2–1	Manchester City	Bodymoor Heath
	Tomás 7'; Staniforth 71'	Report	Shaw 76'	Stadium: Bodymoor Heath; Attendance: Behind-closed-doors

== Competitions ==
=== Women's Super League ===
==== Results summary ====
Overall								Home						Away					
Pld	W	D	L	GF	GA	GD	Pts	W	D	L	GF	GA	GD	W	D	L	GF	GA	GD
22	13	4	5	49	28	+21	43	7	1	3	29	14	+15	6	3	2	20	14	+6

Last updated: 10 May 2025.
Source: FA WSL

==== Results by matchday ====
Round	1	2	3	4	5	6	7	8	9	10	11	12	13	14	15	16	17	18	19	20	21	22
Ground	A	H	H	A	H	A	H	A	H	A	H	A	H	H	A	A	H	A	H	A	A	H
Result	D	W	W	W	W	W	W	L	W	L	L	W	L	W	W	D	L	W	D	W	D	W
Position	6	5	1	1	1	1	1	2	2	2	4	3	4	4	4	4	4	4	4	4	4	4

A = Away; H = Home; W = Win; D = Draw; L = Loss

==== Results ====
22 September 2024 1	Arsenal	2–2	Manchester City	Holloway
12:30	Maanum 8'; Mead 81'	Report	Miedema 42'; Park 58', (yellow card) 85'; Casparij (yellow card) 79'; Greenwood (yellow card) 81'; Shaw (yellow card) 90+3'; Hemp (yellow card) 90+3'	Stadium: Emirates Stadium; Attendance: 41,818; Referee: Abigail Byrne

29 September 2024 2	Manchester City	1–0	Brighton & Hove Albion	Manchester
12:30	Shaw 44'	Report	Pattinson (yellow card) 33'	Stadium: Academy Stadium; Attendance: 3,727; Referee: Stacey Pearson

6 October 2024 3	Manchester City	2–0	West Ham United	Manchester
13:00	Hemp 10'; Fowler 71'; Kennedy (yellow card) 90'	Report	Cooke (yellow card) 90+2'	Stadium: Academy Stadium; Attendance: 3,316; Referee: Elizabeth Simms

13 October 2024 4	Liverpool	1–2	Manchester City	Liverpool
15:00	Smith 41'; Höbinger (yellow card) 65'	Report	Shaw 58', 90+2', (yellow card) 90+8'	Stadium: Anfield; Attendance: 17,484; Referee: Stacey Fullicks

20 October 2024 5	Manchester City	2–1	Aston Villa	Manchester
12:15	Hemp 62'; Roord 70'	Report	Nunes 20'	Stadium: Academy Stadium; Attendance: 3,528; Referee: Kirsty Dowle

3 November 2024 6	Crystal Palace	0–3	Manchester City	Selhurst
14:00		Report	Park 40'; Roord 50'; Shaw 73'	Stadium: Selhurst Park; Attendance: 2,275; Referee: Lisa Benn

8 November 2024 7	Manchester City	4–0	Tottenham Hotspur	Manchester
19:30	Shaw 1', 15', 67'; Roord 66'	Report	James-Turner (yellow card) 77'	Stadium: City of Manchester Stadium; Attendance: 10,319; Referee: Stacey Pearson

16 November 2024 8	Chelsea	2–0	Manchester City	Fulham
17:30	Björn (yellow card) 45+1'; Ramírez 75'; Reiten 79'	Report	Greenwood (yellow card) 47'	Stadium: Stamford Bridge; Attendance: 19,499; Referee: Melissa Burgin

8 December 2024 9	Manchester City	4–0	Leicester City	Manchester
13:00	Shaw 2', 29'; Park 49'; Fowler 58'	Report		Stadium: Academy Stadium; Attendance: 2,699; Referee: Emily Heaslip

15 December 2024 10	Everton	2–1	Manchester City	Walton
12:30	Hope 31'; Hayashi 39'; S. Holmgaard (yellow card) 68'; Olesen (yellow card) 88'	Report	Fowler 89' (pen.)	Stadium: Walton Hall Park; Attendance: 1,292; Referee: Cheryl Foster

19 January 2025 11	Manchester City	2–4	Manchester United	Manchester
18:45	Miedema 40'; Knaak 45+3'	Report	Toone 14', 36', 46'; Galton 21'; George (yellow card) 51'; Clinton (yellow card) 81'	Stadium: City of Manchester Stadium; Attendance: 22,497; Referee: Lisa Benn

25 January 2025 12	Aston Villa	2–4	Manchester City	Aston
12:00	Grant 6'; Aleixandri 46' (o.g.); Nobbs (yellow card) 48'	Report	Miedema 28', 35'; Fowler 54'; Park 62'	Stadium: Villa Park; Referee: Melissa Burgin

2 February 2025 13	Manchester City	3–4	Arsenal	Manchester
12:00	Fowler 20', 55' (pen.); Miedema 50'; Casparij (yellow card) 79'	Report	Caldentey 1'; Wubben-Moy 8'; Maanum 51'; Blackstenius 78'	Stadium: Academy Stadium; Attendance: 4,922; Referee: Cheryl Foster

16 February 2025 14	Manchester City	4–0	Liverpool	Manchester
18:45	Shaw 30', 43'; Roord 60'; Prior 77'	Report	Holland (yellow card) 78'	Stadium: Academy Stadium; Attendance: 3,519; Referee: Kirsty Dowle

2 March 2025 15	Tottenham Hotspur	1–2	Manchester City	Leyton
14:00	England 32'; Spence (yellow card) 45+3'	Report	Miedema 11'; Fujino 78'	Stadium: Brisbane Road; Attendance: 2,119; Referee: Amy Fearn

5 March 2025 16	West Ham United	1–1	Manchester City	Dagenham
19:00	Paví 90+1'	Report	Shaw 80'	Stadium: Victoria Road; Attendance: 1,267; Referee: Grace Lowe
Note: This match, originally scheduled for 16 March, was rescheduled due to Manchester City's participation in the 2025 Women's League Cup final.

23 March 2025 17	Manchester City	1–2	Chelsea	Manchester
14:30	Kerolin 32'	Report	Jean-François (yellow card) 33'; Bright (yellow card) 41'; Beever-Jones 49'; Cuthbert 90+1'	Stadium: City of Manchester Stadium; Attendance: 11,302; Referee: Kirsty Dowle

30 March 2025 18	Brighton & Hove Albion	1–2	Manchester City	Crawley
14:00	Rule 90+2'; Hayes (yellow card) 90+4'	Report	Prior (yellow card) 29'; Casparij 37'; Coombs (yellow card) 55'; Miedema 90', (yellow card) 90+10'	Stadium: Broadfield Stadium; Attendance: 2,480; Referee: Stacey Fullicks

20 April 2025 19	Manchester City	1–1	Everton	Manchester
13:00	Casparij 13'; Park (yellow card) 30'; Knaak (yellow card) 43'	Report	K. Holmgaard 33'; Lawley (yellow card) 90+5'	Stadium: Academy Stadium; Attendance: 2,910; Referee: Phoebe Cross

27 April 2025 20	Leicester City	0–1	Manchester City	Leicester
15:00	Cayman (yellow card) 73'	Report	Park 70'	Stadium: King Power Stadium; Attendance: 3,305; Referee: Ryan Atkin

4 May 2025 21	Manchester United	2–2	Manchester City	Trafford
12:00	Clinton 45'; Mannion (yellow card) 45+8' (yellow-red card) 69'; Malard 68'; Sandberg (yellow card) 90+5'	Report	Aleixandri 38'; Knaak 42'; Prior (yellow card) 45+5'; Greenwood (yellow card) 57'; Keating (yellow card) 90+3'	Stadium: Old Trafford; Attendance: 31,465; Referee: Emily Heaslip

10 May 2025 22	Manchester City	5–2	Crystal Palace	Manchester
12:30	Kerolin 17', 86'; Roord 64'; Knaak 67', 90+4'	Report	Weerden 4'; Gejl 40'	Stadium: Academy Stadium; Attendance: 3,162; Referee: Amy Fearn

==== League table ====
Pos	Team	Pld	W	D	L	GF	GA	GD	Pts	Qualification or relegation
2	Arsenal	22	15	3	4	62	26	+36	48	Qualification for the Champions League league stage (Note: Arsenal qualified for the Champions League league phase as the 2024–25 UEFA Women's Champions League winners.)
3	Manchester United	22	13	5	4	41	16	+25	44	Qualification for the Champions League second qualifying round
4	Manchester City	22	13	4	5	49	28	+21	43	
5	Brighton & Hove Albion	22	8	4	10	35	41	−6	28	
6	Aston Villa	22	7	4	11	32	44	−12	25	

Source: The Football Association
Rules for classification: 1) Points; 2) Goal difference; 3) Number of goals scored.

=== FA Cup ===
As a member of the first tier, Manchester City entered the FA Cup in the fourth round proper.

12 January 2025 Fourth round	Manchester City	3–0	Ipswich Town	Manchester
13:00	Roord 20'; Coombs 55'; Miedema 76'	Report	Garrad (yellow card) 51'	Stadium: Academy Stadium; Attendance: 2,081; Referee: Grace Lowe

9 February 2025 Fifth round	Manchester City	3–1	Leicester City	Manchester
14:00	Ouahabi 18'; Kerolin 29'; Shaw 59'	Report	Kees (yellow card) 65'; Las 82'	Stadium: Academy Stadium; Attendance: 1,959; Referee: Phoebe Cross

9 March 2025 Quarter-final	Manchester City	2–0	Aston Villa	Manchester
12:30	Prior (yellow card) 42'; Shaw 53'; Park 72'	Report		Stadium: Academy Stadium; Attendance: 2,086; Referee: Abigail Byrne

13 April 2025 Semi-final	Manchester City	0–2	Manchester United	Manchester
15:00	Layzell (yellow card) 79'	Report	Bizet 6'; Clinton 22', (yellow card) 56'; Tullis-Joyce (yellow card) 67'; Le Tissier (yellow card) 77'	Stadium: Academy Stadium; Attendance: 5,600; Referee: Stacey Pearson

=== League Cup ===
Having qualified for the 2024–25 UEFA Women's Champions League group stage, Manchester City entered the League Cup at the quarter-final stage.

==== Knockout stage ====
22 January 2025 Quarter-final	Manchester United	1–2	Manchester City	Leigh
19:00	Turner 35'	Report	Coombs 12'; Murphy 45+2'	Stadium: Leigh Sports Village; Attendance: 3,011; Referee: Stacey Fullicks

6 February 2025 Semi-final	Arsenal	1–2	Manchester City	Borehamwood
19:30	Caldentey 58' (pen.)	Report	Fowler 26', 90+5'; Layzell (yellow card) 45'	Stadium: Meadow Park; Attendance: 2,065; Referee: Kirsty Dowle
Note: This match, originally scheduled for a 19:00 kick-off, was delayed for 30 minutes due to a broken down ambulance.

15 March 2025 Final	Chelsea	2–1	Manchester City	Derby
12:15	Ramírez 8'; Bronze (yellow card) 50'; Hasegawa 77' (o.g.)	Report	Miedema (yellow card) 43'; Shaw (yellow card) 57'; Fujino 64'	Stadium: Pride Park Stadium; Attendance: 14,187; Referee: Emily Heaslip

=== Champions League ===
As a result of finishing second in the 2023–24 Women's Super League, Manchester City entered the Champions League in the second qualifying round.

==== Second qualifying round ====
18 September 2024 R2 first leg	Paris FC (France)	0–5	Manchester City	Paris
17:45		Report	Miedema 36'; Park 38', 58'; Fowler 49'; Kelly 79'	Stadium: Stade Sébastien Charléty; Attendance: 3,633; Referee: Sandra Bastos (Portugal)

26 September 2024 R2 second leg	Manchester City	3–0 (8–0 agg.)	(France) Paris FC	Manchester
19:00	Kelly 2'; Shaw 31', 65' (pen.); Kennedy (yellow card) 70'; Murphy (yellow card) 77'	Report	Nnadozie (yellow card) 65'; Gréboval (yellow card) 79'	Stadium: Academy Stadium; Attendance: 1,971; Referee: Ewa Augustyn (Poland)

==== Group stage ====
9 October 2024 Group D	Manchester City	2–0	(Spain) Barcelona	Manchester
20:00	Aleixandri (yellow card) 14'; Layzell 36'; Shaw 77'	Report	León (yellow card) 31'; Graham Hansen (yellow card) 47'	Stadium: Academy Stadium; Attendance: 5,508; Referee: Stéphanie Frappart (France)

16 October 2024 Group D	SKN St. Pölten (Austria)	2–3	Manchester City	St. Pölten, Austria
17:45	Brunnthaler 40'; Dubcová 53'	Report	Kennedy 5'; Fujino 57'; Fowler 80'	Stadium: NV Arena; Attendance: 3,116; Referee: Iuliana Demetrescu (Romania)

12 November 2024 Group D	Manchester City	2–0	(Sweden) Hammarby	Manchester
20:00	Blindkilde Brown 47'; Fujino 80'; Kennedy (yellow card) 90+3'	Report	Lennartsson (yellow card) 45'	Stadium: Academy Stadium; Attendance: 2,233; Referee: Frida Mia Klarlund (Denmark)

21 November 2024 Group D	Hammarby (Sweden)	1–2	Manchester City	Stockholm, Sweden
17:45	Wangerheim 48'	Report	Shaw 31', 52', (yellow card) 31'; Kelly (yellow card) 82'	Stadium: Stockholmsarenan; Attendance: 2,233; Referee: Silvia Gasperotti (Italy)

12 December 2024 Group D	Manchester City	2–0	(Austria) SKN St. Pölten	Manchester
20:00	Murphy 55'; Casparij 66'	Report		Stadium: Academy Stadium; Attendance: 1,454; Referee: Sandra Bastos (Portugal)

18 December 2024 Group D	Barcelona (Spain)	3–0	Manchester City	Sant Joan Despí, Spain
17:45	Pina 44'; Bonmatí 57'; Putellas 69'	Report	Casparij (yellow card) 82'	Stadium: Johan Cruyff Stadium; Attendance: 29,007; Referee: Jelena Cvetković (Serbia)

Pos	Team	Pld	W	D	L	GF	GA	GD	Pts	Qualification
1	(Spain) Barcelona	6	5	0	1	26	3	+23	15 (Note: Barcelona 3 Pts, +1 GD; Manchester City 3 Pts, −1 GD.)	Advance to quarter-finals
2	(England) Manchester City	6	5	0	1	11	6	+5	15	Advance to quarter-finals
3	(Sweden) Hammarby	6	2	0	4	5	17	−12	6	
4	(Austria) St. Pölten	6	0	0	6	4	20	−16	0	

Source: UEFA
Rules for classification: Group stage tiebreakers

==== Knockout phase ====
Quarter-finals

19 March 2025 QF first leg	Manchester City	2–0	(England) Chelsea	Manchester
20:00	Miedema 60', 88'; Kerolin (yellow card) 77'	Report		Stadium: Academy Stadium; Attendance: 4,094; Referee: Désirée Grundbacher (Switzerland)

27 March 2025 QF second leg	Chelsea (England)	3–0 (3–2 agg.)	Manchester City	Fulham
20:00	Baltimore 14', (yellow card) 55'; Björn 38'; Ramírez 43'; Walsh (yellow card) 90+2'	Report	Aleixandri (yellow card) 46'	Stadium: Stamford Bridge; Attendance: 10,769; Referee: Catarina Campos (Portugal)

== Squad information ==
=== Playing statistics ===
As of 10 May 2025

Starting appearances are listed first, followed by substitute appearances after the + symbol where applicable.

No.	Pos	Nat	Player	Total		WSL		FA Cup		League Cup		Champions League	
No.	Pos	Nat	Player	Apps	Goals	Apps	Goals	Apps	Goals	Apps	Goals	Apps	Goals
2	DF	(Japan) JPN	Risa Shimizu	0	0	0	0	0	0	0	0	0	0
3	DF	(England) ENG	Naomi Layzell	14	1	4+2	0	0+3	0	1	0	2+2	1
4	DF	(Spain) ESP	Laia Aleixandri	33	1	18	1	3+1	0	3	0	6+2	0
5	DF	(England) ENG	Alex Greenwood	19	0	11+1	0	0	0	0	0	7	0
6	FW	(Netherlands) NED	Vivianne Miedema	19	11	8+3	7	1+1	1	2	0	3+1	3
7	MF	(England) ENG	Laura Coombs	20	2	6+5	0	2	1	1	1	0+6	0
8	FW	(Australia) AUS	Mary Fowler	34	10	12+5	6	4	0	3	2	10	2
10	MF	(Netherlands) NED	Jill Roord	31	6	14+5	5	3	1	2+1	0	3+3	0
11	FW	(England) ENG	Lauren Hemp	13	2	9+1	2	0	0	0	0	2+1	0
12	GK	(England) ENG	Eve Annets	0	0	0	0	0	0	0	0	0	0
13	DF	(Austria) AUT	Laura Wienroither	8	0	2+3	0	0+3	0	0	0	0	0
14	FW	(Brazil) BRA	Kerolin	18	4	7+4	3	2+1	1	1+1	0	2	0
15	DF	(Spain) ESP	Leila Ouahabi	35	1	18+2	0	4	1	2+1	0	8	0
16	FW	(England) ENG	Jess Park	38	8	19+2	5	3+1	1	0+3	0	9+1	2
18	DF	(Netherlands) NED	Kerstin Casparij	36	3	21	2	4	0	3	0	7+1	1
19	MF	(England) ENG	Laura Blindkilde Brown	23	1	3+8	0	1+2	0	1	0	6+2	1
20	FW	(Japan) JPN	Aoba Fujino	29	4	12+5	1	1	0	3	1	6+2	2
21	FW	(Jamaica) JAM	Khadija Shaw	22	19	10+4	12	1+1	2	1	0	4+1	5
25	MF	(Japan) JPN	Yui Hasegawa	38	0	22	0	3	0	3	0	10	0
26	DF	(Republic of Ireland) IRL	Tara O'Hanlon	0	0	0	0	0	0	0	0	0	0
27	DF	(Germany) GER	Rebecca Knaak	12	4	7+1	4	2	0	2	0	0	0
28	DF	(England) ENG	Gracie Prior	19	1	8+1	1	3	0	1	0	3+3	0
30	MF	(Japan) JPN	Aemu Oyama	2	0	0+2	0	0	0	0	0	0	0
31	GK	(Japan) JPN	Ayaka Yamashita	21	0	10	0	3	0	2+1	0	5	0
35	GK	(England) ENG	Khiara Keating	19	0	12	0	1	0	1	0	5	0
40	GK	(England) ENG	Katie Startup	0	0	0	0	0	0	0	0	0	0
44	DF	(England) ENG	Codie Thomas	3	0	0+1	0	0	0	0	0	1+1	0
46	FW	(England) ENG	Lily Murphy	22	2	4+7	0	2+1	0	1	1	3+4	1
52	MF	(Republic of Ireland) IRL	Eve O'Carroll	1	0	0+1	0	0	0	0	0	0	0
53	DF	(Wales) WAL	Mayzee Davies	0	0	0	0	0	0	0	0	0	0
Players away from the club on loan:
9	FW	(England) ENG	Chloe Kelly	12	2	1+5	0	1	0	0	0	2+3	2
Players who appeared for the club but left during the season:
14	DF	(Australia) AUS	Alanna Kennedy	15	1	4+3	0	0	0	0	0	6+2	1

== Transfers and loans ==
=== Transfers in ===
Date	Position	No.	Player	From club
1 July 2024	DF	53	(Wales) Mayzee Davies	(England) Manchester United
5 July 2024	FW	6	(Netherlands) Vivianne Miedema	(England) Arsenal
12 July 2024	DF	2	(Japan) Risa Shimizu	(England) West Ham United
2 August 2024	FW	20	(Japan) Aoba Fujino	(Japan) Tokyo Verdy Beleza
5 August 2024	GK	12	(England) Eve Annets	(England) Reading
9 August 2024	GK	31	(Japan) Ayaka Yamashita	(Japan) INAC Kobe Leonessa
19 August 2024	DF	3	(England) Naomi Layzell	(England) Bristol City
6 September 2024	GK	40	(England) Katie Startup	(England) Brighton & Hove Albion
1 January 2025	DF	27	(Germany) Rebecca Knaak	(Sweden) FC Rosengård
18 January 2025	MF	30	(Japan) Aemu Oyama	(Japan) Waseda University
22 January 2025	FW	14	(Brazil) Kerolin	(United States) North Carolina Courage

=== Loans in ===
Start date	End date	Position	No.	Player	From club
30 January 2025	30 June 2025	DF	13	(Austria) Laura Wienroither	(England) Arsenal

=== Transfers out ===
Date	Position	No.	Player	To club
18 May 2024	MF	12	(Sweden) Filippa Angeldahl	(Spain) Real Madrid
18 May 2024	DF	6	(England) Steph Houghton	Retired
18 May 2024	MF	30	(England) Ruby Mace	(England) Leicester City
18 May 2024	GK	1	(England) Ellie Roebuck	(Spain) Barcelona
18 May 2024	DF	3	(England) Demi Stokes	(England) Newcastle United
27 May 2024	DF	14	(England) Esme Morgan	(United States) Washington Spirit
1 July 2024	FW	42	(England) Ginny Lackey	(United States) James Madison Dukes
1 July 2024	MF		(England) Dolcie O'Connor	(United States) Coastal Carolina Chanticleers
1 July 2024	DF	34	(England) Beth Strutton	(United States) Louisiana–Monroe Warhawks
1 July 2024	FW		(England) Clara Samson	(United States) UC Irvine Anteaters
29 July 2024	MF	43	(England) Jemima Dahou	(England) Blackburn Rovers
10 August 2024	DF	36	(England) Annie Hutchings	(England) Portsmouth
14 August 2024	DF	39	(England) Emma Siddall	(England) Burnley
20 January 2025	GK	22	(Scotland) Sandy MacIver	(United States) Washington Spirit
21 January 2025	DF	14	(Australia) Alanna Kennedy	(United States) Angel City FC

=== Loans out ===
Start date	End date	Position	No.	Player	To club
27 July 2024	30 June 2025	DF	53	(Wales) Mayzee Davies (Note: Dual registration)	(England) Liverpool Feds
31 August 2024	17 January 2025	GK	12	(England) Eve Annets	(England) Portsmouth
13 September 2024	13 January 2025	FW	17	(England) Poppy Pritchard	(England) Crystal Palace
18 January 2025	30 June 2025	FW	17	(England) Poppy Pritchard	(England) Newcastle United
30 January 2025	30 June 2025	FW	9	(England) Chloe Kelly	(England) Arsenal
