= Aoba Fujino =

Japanese association football player (born 2004)

Aoba Fujino 藤野 あおば
Personal information
- Date of birth: 27 January 2004 (age 22)
- Place of birth: Machida, Tokyo, Japan
- Height: 1.62 m (5 ft 4 in)
- Position: Forward

Team information
- Current team: Manchester City
- Number: 20

Youth career
- Minamiosawa FC
- Tokyo Verdy Sereias
- 2019–2021: Jumonji High School

Senior career*
Years	Team	Apps	(Gls)
2021–2024	Tokyo Verdy Beleza	51	(24)
2024–	Manchester City	44	(7)

International career^{‡}
2022	Japan U-20	6	(1)
2022–	Japan	48	(12)
Medal record
Women's football
Representing Japan
AFC Women's Asian Cup
Winner	2026 Australia
- * Club domestic league appearances and goals as of 22:15, 22 November 2026 (UTC) ‡ National team caps and goals as of 22:10, 18 October 2026 (UTC)

Aoba Fujino (藤野 あおば, Fujino Aoba; IPA: [ɸɯʑino aꜜoba]; born 27 January 2004) is a Japanese professional footballer who plays as a forward for Women's Super League club Manchester City and the Japan national team.

== Club career ==
Fujino begun her youth career with Nippon TV Menina, the youth academy of Tokyo Verdy Beleza. Unable to progress through the youth rank, she left the team and instead went on to Jumonji High School. She rejoined Tokyo Verdy Beleza upon her graduation from high school.

Fujino made her WE League debut on 16 October 2021. On 2 August 2024, she signed a three-year deal with Women's Super League side Manchester City. She scored her first goal for the club during a 3-2 UEFA Champions League win against St. Pölten on 16 October 2024.

In the first home game of the 2025–26 season, Fujino assisted the winning goal to make it 2–1 against Brighton.

== International career ==
In July 2022, Fujino was selected for the Japan U-20 national team for the 2022 U-20 World Cup where Japan were the runners-up.

On 13 June 2023, she was included in Japan's 23-player squad for the 2023 FIFA World Cup. On July 26, 2023, she scored her first World Cup goal against Costa Rica in the 2nd round of the 2023 FIFA World Cup Group C, becoming the youngest Japanese goal scorer (19 years and 180 days) in the World Cup for both men and women.

On 14 June 2024, Fujino was included in the Japan squad for the 2024 Summer Olympics.

Fujino was part of the Japan squad that won the 2025 SheBelieves Cup.

== Career statistics ==
=== Club ===
As of match played 22 November 2026

Appearances and goals by club, season and competition
Club	Season	League			National cup (Note: Includes Empress's Cup, Women's FA Cup)		League cup (Note: Includes WE League Cup, FA Women's League Cup)		Continental (Note: Includes UEFA Women's Champions League)		Total	
Club	Season	Division	Apps	Goals	Apps	Goals	Apps	Goals	Apps	Goals	Apps	Goals
Tokyo Verdy Beleza	2021–22	WE League	10	4	0	0	0	0	—		10	4
Tokyo Verdy Beleza	2022–23	WE League	20	11	4	3	4	3	—		28	17
Tokyo Verdy Beleza	2023–24	WE League	21	9	2	1	5	2	—		28	12
Tokyo Verdy Beleza	Total		51	24	6	4	9	5	0	0	66	33
Manchester City	2024–25	Women's Super League	17	1	1	0	3	1	8	2	29	4
Manchester City	2025–26	Women's Super League	16	5	4	2	2	0	—		22	7
Manchester City	2026–27	Women's Super League	11	1	0	0	—		5	2	16	3
Manchester City	Total		44	7	5	2	5	1	13	4	67	14
Career total			95	31	11	6	14	6	13	4	133	47

=== International ===
As of match played 13 October 2026

Appearances and goals by national team and year
National team	Year	Apps	Goals
Japan	2022	4	0
Japan	2023	14	3
Japan	2024	9	5
Japan	2025	9	1
Japan	2026	12	3
Total		48	12

Scores and results list Japan's goal tally first, score column indicates score after each Fujino goal.

List of international goals scored by Aoba Fujino
No.	Date	Venue	Opponent	Score	Result	Competition
1	14 July 2023	Yurtec Stadium Sendai, Sendai, Japan	Panama	4–0	5–0	Friendly
2	26 July 2023	Forsyth Barr Stadium, Dunedin, New Zealand	Costa Rica	2–0	2–0	2023 FIFA Women's World Cup
3	30 November 2023	Arena Corinthians, São Paulo, Brazil	Brazil	1–0	3–4	Friendly
4	28 February 2024	Japan National Stadium, Tokyo, Japan	North Korea	2–0	2–1	2024 AFC Women's Olympic Qualifying Tournament
5	3 June 2024	Estadio Nueva Condomina, Murcia, Spain	New Zealand	3–1	4–1	Friendly
6	13 July 2024	Kanazawa Stadium, Kanazawa, Ishikawa, Japan	Ghana	4–0	4–0	MS&AD Cup
7	26 July 2024	Stade de la Beaujoire, Nantes, France	Spain	1–0	1–2	2024 Summer Olympics
8	26 October 2024	Japan National Stadium, Tokyo, Japan	South Korea	2–0	4–0	Friendly
9	29 November 2025	Peace Stadium, Nagasaki, Japan	Canada	3–0	3–0	Friendly
10	10 March 2026	Perth Rectangular Stadium, Perth, Australia	Vietnam	3–0	4–0	2026 AFC Women's Asian Cup
11	6 June 2026	Yodoko Sakura Stadium, Osaka, Japan	South Africa	4–0	5–0	Friendly
12	6 June 2026	Yodoko Sakura Stadium, Osaka, Japan	South Africa	5–0	5–0	Friendly

== Honours ==
Tokyo Verdy Beleza

- Empress's Cup: 2022

Manchester City

- Women's Super League: 2025–26
- Women's FA Cup: 2025–26

Japan U20

- FIFA U-20 Women's World Cup runner-up: 2022

Japan

- AFC Women's Asian Cup: 2026
- SheBelieves Cup: 2025

Individual

- 2022 FIFA U-20 Women's World Cup: Bronze Boot
- WE League Best XI: 2022–23
- WE League Valuable Player Award: 2021–22、2022–23
