= Manchester City W.F.C. Academy =

Manchester City Girls' Academy
- Full name: Manchester City Football Club Girls' Academy
- Founded: 1997; 28 years ago
- Ground: Etihad Campus; Manchester, England
- Managing director: Charlotte O'Neill
- Head of Academy: Hannah Dingley

Manchester City Girls' Academy is the youth development academy for Manchester City Women. Hannah Dingley is its technical director.

The academy's most senior team is the Next Gen squad, which play in the PGA U21 Academy League. The academy also has age-group teams at under-10, under-12, under-13 and under-14 and under-16 levels.

== History ==
Manchester City Ladies were founded in 1988 by a member of Manchester City's community outreach programme. Although the new club had a reserve side from the start, no junior section was created until 1997 when a member of the club's committee arranged for Manchester City Ladies to adopt the Stockport County Ladies under-14 team which the latter club were no longer in a position to support. This provided the impetus for the club to arrange the creation of an entire youth academy, with under-10, under-12, under-14 and under-16 teams being made and filled with local girls.

During 2000–01, the club experienced the most successful season in its history, with four teams winning their respective leagues, one successful in a league and cup double and the under-13's completing a treble.

Season 2002–03 proved to be another successful campaign, with first team finishing mid-table and consolidating their position at this level, while the under-12's won their league without dropping a single point. This was followed in 2003–04 when the under-13's won the Tameside League and Cup double, narrowly missing out in the final of the League Cup. Following on, the under-13 team competing in the following season (2004–05) had a clean sweep of the honours, winning the treble.

In 2003 the club achieved The FA Charter Standard Club award for both junior and adult sections.

== Honours ==
Due to a paucity of clear information and a proliferation of minor regional league competitions at youth level, only national-level titles recorded from the start of the FA WSL era have been recorded.

=== Development Squad ===
- FA WSL Academy League Northern Division
  - Winners (1): 2017–18
- FA WSL Development League Cup
  - Winners (1): 2017–18

=== Under-16 Squad ===
- FA Girls Youth Cup
  - Winners (1): 2017–18
