= Laia Aleixandri =

Spanish footballer (born 2000)

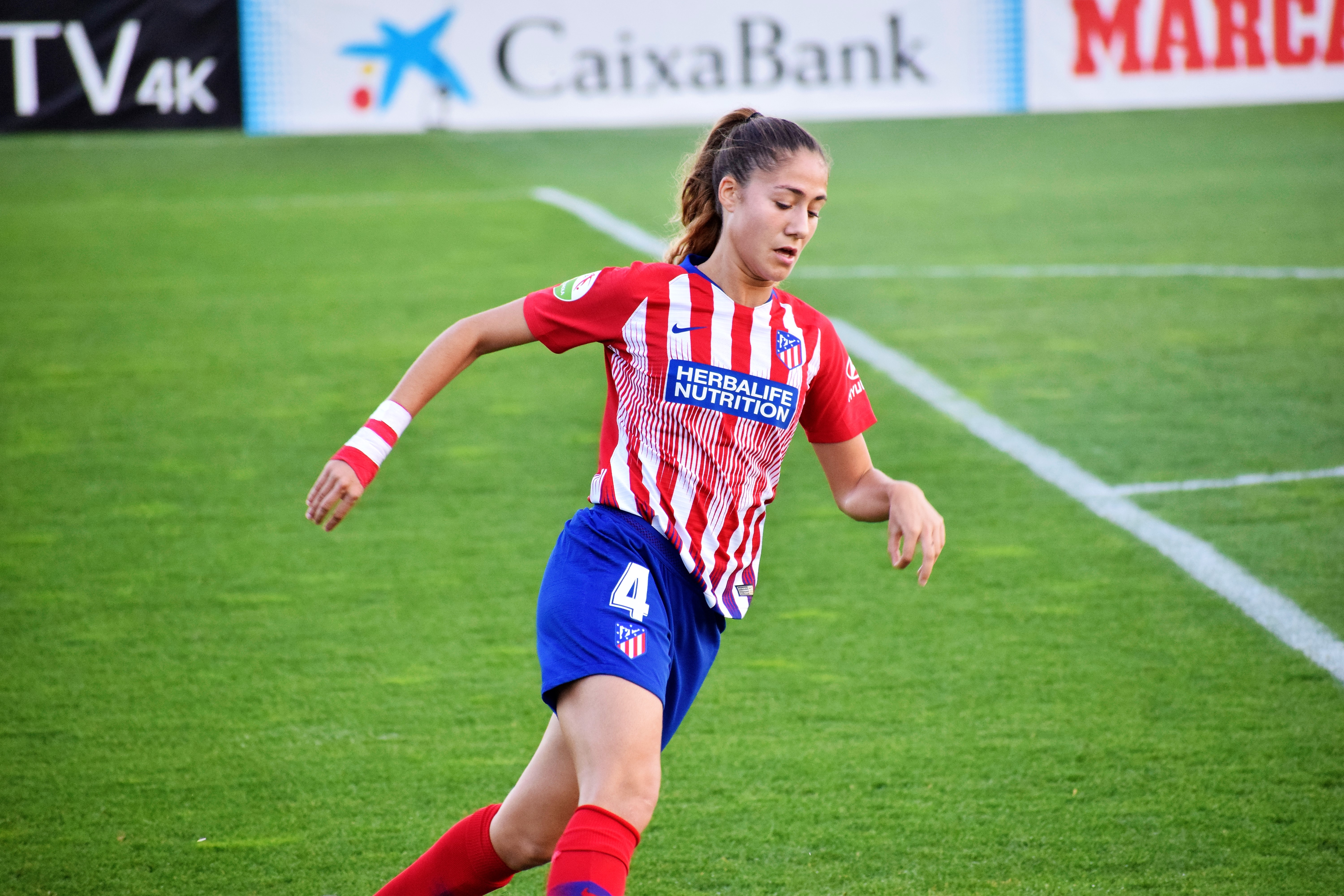
- Aleixandri with Atlético Madrid in 2019

Personal information
- Full name: Laia Aleixandri López
- Date of birth: 25 August 2000 (age 26)
- Place of birth: Santa Coloma de Gramenet, Spain
- Height: 1.70 m (5 ft 7 in)
- Positions: Centre-back; defensive midfielder

Team information
- Current team: Barcelona
- Number: 5

Youth career
- 2006–2008: Arrabal Calaf
- 2008–2012: Sant Gabriel
- 2012–2015: Barcelona

Senior career*
Years	Team	Apps	(Gls)
2015–2017	Barcelona B		
2017–2022	Atlético Madrid	115	(8)
2022–2025	Manchester City	55	(2)
2025–	Barcelona	9	(3)

International career^{‡}
2015–2017	Spain U17	30	(5)
2017–2019	Spain U19	11	(1)
2018–2019	Spain U20	6	(0)
2019–	Spain	40	(3)
2019–	Catalonia	1	(0)
Medal record
Women's football
Representing Spain
UEFA Women's Championship
Runner-up	2025 Switzerland
UEFA Women's Nations League
Winner	2024 France–Netherlands–Spain
FIFA U-20 World Cup
Runner-up	2018 France
UEFA Women's Under-19 Championship
Winner	2017 Northern Ireland
Runner-up	2016 Slovakia
UEFA Women's Under-17 Championship
Winner	2015 Iceland
- * Club domestic league appearances and goals as of 11:40, 12 November 2025 (UTC) ‡ National team caps and goals as of 11:40, 31 May 2025 (UTC)

Laia Aleixandri López (Catalan: [ˈlajə ələˈʃandɾi ˈlɔpəθ]; born 25 August 2000) is a Spanish professional footballer who plays as centre-back or defensive midfielder for Liga F club FC Barcelona and the Spain national team.

In January 2020, she was named by UEFA as one of the 10 most promising young players in Europe.

== Club career ==
=== Youth ===
Laia started playing football when she was 4 years old. Between 2006 and 2008 she played for CE Arrabal Calaf in the youngest category. In 2008 she started playing at CE Sant Gabriel where she stayed for four years. She entered the youth ranks of FC Barcelona at the age of 11 and played for three seasons.

=== FC Barcelona "B" ===
In the 2015–16 season, Laia joined Barcelona B, making her debut in the Second Division at the age of 14 on the U17 team. They were proclaimed champion of their group with 72 points in 26 games.

In the 2016–17 season, she was once again part of the club's B squad. That season they once again became champions of their category with 60 points.

=== Atlético Madrid ===
Laia signed for Atlético Madrid and made her debut on 2 September 2017 in the First Division in an away match against Fundación Albacete, earning a 3–1 victory.

On 25 April 2018, she suffered a fracture of the ulna and radius of her right arm while playing with the U20 national team. Laia played seven league games in the 2017–18 season and ended up becoming champion of the League and runner-up in the national cup with Atlético Madrid.

Laia played in the U-20 World Cup with an outstanding performance, establishing herself as a starter in the 2018–19 season. On 4 November 2018, she scored her first goal with Atlético against Levante and was chosen Player of the Match. She continued to be a starter throughout the league season, missing only one game due to injury and another due to suspension. In May 2019, she achieved her second League title. In the Copa de la Reina, she had a prominent role in the semi-finals and played in the final where Atlético were runners-up to Real Sociedad.

During the 2019–20 season, she established herself as a starter. She played 20 league games before it was suspended due to the COVID-19 pandemic and finished runner-up in the league.

In the 2020–21 season, she debuted as captain in November, and was named fourth captain in December. In December, she was included in the Football Draft Golden Eleven for her performances during the season. In January 2021, she won the Super Cup and was named best player of the championship. Then she was chosen best player of the month for February and March by the fans. In March 2021, the IFFHS included her in its UEFA Under-20 Team of the Year 2020.

In the 2021–22 season, she scored a double in the 5–0 victory over Rayo Vallecano. In October 2021, she was chosen in the Golden Eleven of Football Draft. A regular starter in the team, in January 2022 her commemorative plaque was installed on the club's legends walk, which certifies having played more than 100 games for Atlético Madrid.

=== Manchester City ===
After another year being a key pillar at Atlético Madrid, on 9 June 2022, both Laia and Manchester City announced she would join the club at the beginning of the 2022–23 season.

Laia scored in the 74th minute in the 1–0 win over Arsenal in the fifth round of the 2023–24 FA Cup, advancing Manchester City to the quarterfinals. Her departure from the club was announced following the last game of the 2024–25 season on 10 May 2025.

== International career ==
=== Youth ===
With the U-16 national team, Laia was called up to play in the UEFA Development Tournament on 9 February 2015. She was proclaimed champion of the tournament along with her teammates after beating Scotland, Germany, and Netherlands.

Laia debuted with the Spain U-17 team on 11 March 2015 at the age of 14 in Spain's 1–0 victory over England in a friendly match, in which she scored the winning goal. On 22 March, she debuted in an official match against Russia with a three-zero victory, scoring one of the goals. That summer, she was called up for the U-17 European Championship where she became champion by defeating Switzerland by 5–2 in the final. Laia was chosen as part of the Best Team of the tournament.

In 2016, she played again in the U-17 European Championship where Spain lost the final on penalties against Germany, and Laia was again chosen in the team of the tournament. That same year, she played in the 2016 FIFA U-17 World Cup, where Laia started in all the matches. She scored against New Zealand in the group stage and was chosen Player of the Match. She was nominated for the Golden Ball of the tournament, and made the Best Team of the tournament. Spain finished as runners-up.

In 2017, she played her third U-17 European Championship, captaining the team and losing on penalties in the final. Laia was once again part of the tournament's best team.

Laia played a total of 34 games with the U-17 national team and scored 7 goals, being the player who has played the most games in this category.

On 5 September 2017, Laia was called up to the U-19 national team. Laia debuted in this category on 12 September 2017 in Florence against Italy in a match that ended with a 2–2 draw.

Laia was called up with the U-20 national team to compete in the 2018 World Cup in France. She started as a substitute but an injury to Ona Batlle in the first match allowed her to play the rest of the games as a starter. Spain were runners-up in the world after losing 3–1 in the final against Japan.

She participated as a starter in the qualification for the 2019 U-19 European Championship. She played all four matches in the finals in Scotland as a starter, making her debut against Belgium as captain of the team and scoring the team's second goal by heading in a corner kick in a 2–1 victory. In the second match they beat England 1–0, with which they qualified for the semi-final and for the 2020 U-20 World Cup. In the third match, they tied 0–0 against Germany, being second group by goal difference. In the semifinal against France, they tied the game and lost 3–1 in extra time. At the end of the tournament, she was chosen as part of the championship's ideal eleven.

=== Senior ===
She debuted with the senior national team on 17 May 2019 in a friendly against Cameroon in preparation for the World Cup in France, in which she scored a goal. On 27 November 2020, she played her second match and her first in official competition in the 10–0 victory over Moldova. Since then she was regularly called up as a replacement for the starting centre-backs, Mapi León and Irene Paredes. She started the first qualifying match for the 2023 World Cup against the Faroe Islands in which she scored the last goal of the match, concluding with a result of 10–0.

She was called up to the first list of those selected for the Euro 2022. On 27 June, she was part of the final call to compete in the Euro.

In 2023, she was part of Las 15, a group of 15 players that withdrew themselves from the national team in a rift with the national team coach Jorge Vilda.

On 10 June 2025, Aleixandri was called up to the Spain squad for the UEFA Euro 2025.

== Career statistics ==
=== Club ===
As of match played 12 November 2025

Appearances and goals by club, season and competition
Club	Season	League			National cup (Note: Includes Copa de la Reina, Women's FA Cup)		League cup (Note: Includes FA Women's League Cup)		Continental		Other (Note: includes Supercopa de España Femenina)		Total	
Club	Season	Division	Apps	Goals	Apps	Goals	Apps	Goals	Apps	Goals	Apps	Goals	Apps	Goals
Atlético Madrid	2017–18	Primera División	7	0	0	0	—		1	0	—		8	0
Atlético Madrid	2018–19	Primera División	18	2	4	0	—		3	0	—		25	2
Atlético Madrid	2019–20	Primera División	20	1	1	0	—		4	0	1	0	26	1
Atlético Madrid	2020–21	Primera División	31	1	2	0	—		4	0	2	0	39	1
Atlético Madrid	2021–22	Primera División	29	4	1	0	—		0	0	2	0	32	4
Atlético Madrid	Total		105	8	8	0	—		12	0	5	0	130	8
Manchester City	2022–23	Women's Super League	16	0	3	0	4	0	2	0	—		25	0
Manchester City	2023–24	Women's Super League	21	1	3	1	5	0	—		—		29	2
Manchester City	2024–25	Women's Super League	18	1	4	0	3	0	8	0	—		33	1
Manchester City	Total		55	2	10	1	12	0	10	0	—		87	3
Barcelona	2025–26	Liga F	9	3	—	—	—		2	0	—	—	11	3
Barcelona	Total		9	3	—	—	—		2	0	—	—	11	3
Career total			169	13	18	1	12	0	24	0	5	0	228	14

=== International ===
As of match played 30 May 2025

Appearances and goals by national team and year
National team	Year	Apps	Goals
Spain	2019	1	1
Spain	2020	0	0
Spain	2021	3	0
Spain	2022	12	1
Spain	2023	6	0
Spain	2024	13	0
Spain	2025	5	1
Total		40	3

Scores and results list Spain's goal tally first, score column indicates score after each Aleixandri goal.

List of international goals scored by Laia Aleixandri
No.	Date	Venue	Opponent	Score	Result	Competition
1.	17 May 2019	Estadio Pedro Escartín, Guadalajara, Spain	Cameroon	4–0	4–0	Friendly
2.	16 September 2021	Tórsvøllur, Tórshavn, Faroe Islands	Faroe Islands	10–0	10–0	2023 FIFA Women's World Cup qualification
3.	4 April 2025	Estádio Capital do Móvel, Paços de Ferreira, Portugal	Portugal	2–1	4–2	2025 UEFA Women's Nations League

== Honours ==
Atletico de Madrid

- Primera División: 2016–17, 2017–2018, 2018–19
- Copa de la Reina runner-up: 2018, 2019

Barcelona B

- Segunda División: 2015–16, 2016–17

Barcelona

- Liga F: 2025–26
- Copa de la Reina: 2025–26
- UEFA Women's Champions League: 2025–26

Spain U17

- UEFA Women's Under-17 Championship: 2015

Spain U19

- UEFA Women's Under-19 Championship: 2017; runner-up: 2016

Spain U20

- FIFA U-20 Women's World Cup runner-up: 2018

Spain

- UEFA Women's Championship runner-up: 2025
- UEFA Women's Nations League: 2023–24, 2025

Individual

- PFA WSL Team of the Year: 2023–24
