= Eve O'Carroll =

Irish footballer (born 2007)

Personal information
- Date of birth: 17 January 2007 (age 19)
- Place of birth: England
- Height: 1.68 m (5 ft 6 in)
- Position: Midfielder

Team information
- Current team: Old Dominion Monarchs
- Number: 23

Youth career
- Wigan Athletic
- 2022–2024: Manchester City

College career
Years	Team	Apps	(Gls)
2026–	Old Dominion Monarchs	9	(0)

Senior career*
Years	Team	Apps	(Gls)
2024–2026	Manchester City	1	(0)
2026	Chattanooga Red Wolves	10	(0)

International career^{‡}
2023	Republic of Ireland U17	4	(0)
2024–2026	Republic of Ireland U19	3	(0)
- * Club domestic league appearances and goals as of 11 January 2026 ‡ National team caps and goals as of 26 June 2025

Eve O'Carroll (born 17 January 2007) is a professional footballer who plays as a midfielder for NCAA college Old Dominion Monarchs. Born in England, she has represented the Republic of Ireland at under-17 and under-19 level.

== Club career ==
O'Carroll began her career at Wigan Athletic's academy, before joining Manchester City's academy in 2022.

O'Carroll was included as part of the 2024–25 pre-season fixtures in Australia. She made her senior City debut on 8 December 2024, coming on as a substitute in a 4–0 victory against Leicester City.

She joined American college Old Dominion Monarchs after departing Manchester City in May 2026, before joining the Monarchs she had a brief stint with the Chattanooga Red Wolves for the duration of the 2026 USL W League season season.

== International career ==
Born in England to parents from Derry, O'Carroll is eligible to play for England, Northern Ireland and Republic of Ireland at international level. She made her Republic of Ireland under-17 debut in August 2023 and was featured in that squad for the UEFA Women's Under-17 Championship qualification.

== Honours ==
Manchester City

- Women's Super League: 2025–26
