= Kerstin Casparij =

Dutch footballer (born 2000)

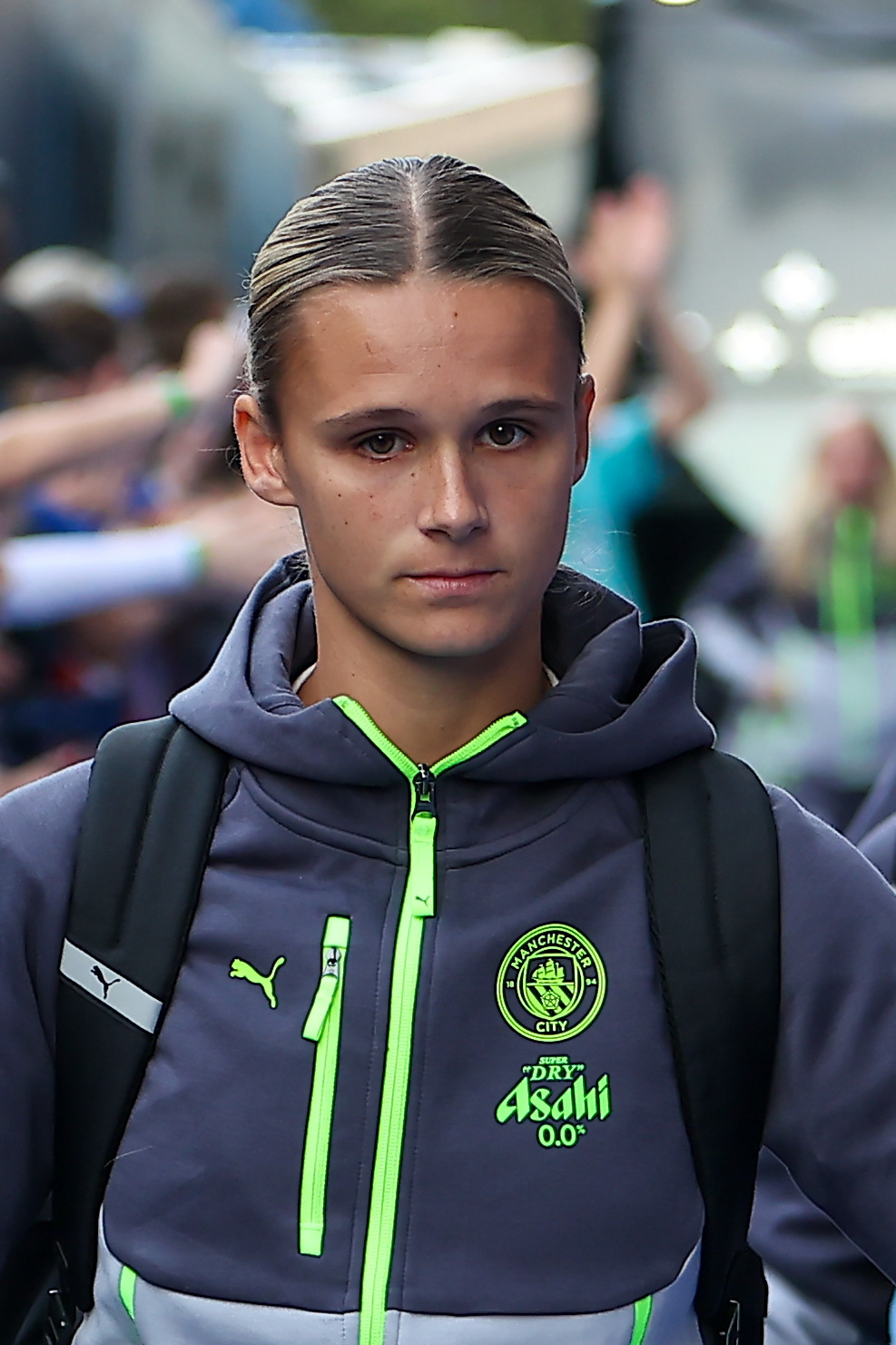
- Casparij with Manchester City in 2025

Personal information
- Full name: Kerstin Yasmijn Casparij
- Date of birth: 19 August 2000 (age 26)
- Place of birth: Alphen aan den Rijn, Netherlands
- Height: 1.69 m (5 ft 7 in)
- Positions: Right-back; central midfielder

Team information
- Current team: Manchester City
- Number: 18

Senior career*
Years	Team	Apps	(Gls)
2015–2017	Heerenveen	35	(1)
2017–2018	VV Alkmaar	22	(2)
2018–2020	Heerenveen	34	(6)
2020–2022	Twente	42	(4)
2022–	Manchester City	87	(6)

International career^{‡}
2015	Netherlands U15	4	(0)
2016	Netherlands U16	9	(2)
2016–2017	Netherlands U17	8	(3)
2017–2019	Netherlands U19	28	(9)
2019–2021	Netherlands U23	6	(0)
2021–	Netherlands	55	(0)
- * Club domestic league appearances and goals as of 22:15, 22 November 2026 (UTC) ‡ National team caps and goals as of 21:00, 13 October 2026 (UTC)

Kerstin Yasmijn Casparij (Dutch: [ˈkɛrstɪ ɲɑsˈmɛiŋ kɑspaːˈrɛi]; born 19 August 2000) is a Dutch professional footballer who plays as a right-back or central midfielder for Women's Super League club Manchester City and the Netherlands national team.

== Club career ==
=== First spell at Heerenveen ===
Casparij made her debut for Heerenveen in the Eredivisie at the age of 15. She made her league debut against Twente on 6 November 2015. Casparij scored her first league goal against Achilles '29 on 23 December 2016, scoring in the 65th minute.

=== VV Alkmaar ===
After two years, she moved to VV Alkmaar. She made her league debut against Heerenveen on 1 September 2017. She scored her first league goal against Excelsior on 10 November 2017, scoring in the 45th minute.

=== Heerenveen (second stint) ===
After a year at VV Alkmaar, she returned to Heerenveen. During her second spell, she made her league debut against Achilles '29 on 14 September 2018. She scored a hat trick, which was also her first goals for the club during her second spell, against Achilles '29 on 27 November 2018.

=== Twente ===
She joined Twente in 2020. Casparij made her league debut against Ajax on 6 September 2020. She scored her first league goal against PEC Zwolle on 11 September 2020, scoring in the 82nd minute.

=== Manchester City ===
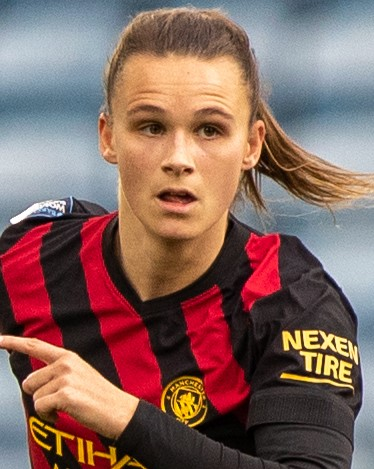
Casparij with Manchester City in 2023

On 26 July 2022, Casparij joined Women's Super League club Manchester City on a three-year deal. She was signed to replace Lucy Bronze. Casparij made her league debut against Chelsea on 25 September 2022.

Along with Rico Lewis, Casparij was named as the club's PFA Community Champions on 24 May 2024.

Casparij scored and was named player of the match in a 3–0 derby win over Manchester United in the WSL on 28 March 2026.

== International career ==
Casparij has played for Netherlands youth teams in several age groups. She made her senior team debut on 22 October 2021 as an 83rd-minute substitute for Daniëlle van de Donk in a 8–0 win against Cyprus.

On 31 May 2023, she was named as part of the Netherlands provisional squad for the 2023 FIFA Women's World Cup.

== Personal life ==
Casparij is queer and a lesbian. As of 2025, she is dating Ruth Brown, a woman who she met on Tinder and does not work in football. She has a cat named Kiwi.

Casparij is supportive of trans people, dedicating her goal in the 20 April 2025 match against Everton to "all my trans siblings, who’ve had an incredibly tough & heartbreaking week", in the wake of the UK Supreme Court judgement in For Women Scotland Ltd v The Scottish Ministers. In September 2025, she became a patron of the LGBT Foundation and will help with fundraising for safe spaces for queer women in the community.

Casparij has ADHD.

== Career statistics ==
=== Club ===
As of match played 22 November 2026

Appearances and goals by club, season and competition
Club	Season	League			National cup (Note: Includes KNVB Women's Cup, Women's FA Cup)		League cup (Note: Includes Eredivisie Cup, FA WSL Cup)		Continental		Total	
Club	Season	Division	Apps	Goals	Apps	Goals	Apps	Goals	Apps	Goals	Apps	Goals
Heerenveen	2015–16	Eredivisie	13	0	?	?	—		—		13	0
Heerenveen	2016–17	Eredivisie	22	1	?	?	—		—		22	1
Heerenveen	Total		35	1	?	?	—		—		35	1
VV Alkmaar	2017–18	Eredivisie	22	2	?	0	—		—		22	2
Heerenveen	2018–19	Eredivisie	23	5	?	0	—		—		23	5
Heerenveen	2019–20	Eredivisie	11	1	?	0	1	0	—		12	1
Heerenveen	Total		34	6	?	?	1	0	—		35	6
FC Twente	2020–21	Eredivisie	20	3	1	0	5	2	—		26	5
FC Twente	2021–22	Eredivisie	22	1	2	0	3	0	4	0	31	1
FC Twente	Total		42	4	3	0	8	2	4	0	57	6
Manchester City	2022–23	Women's Super League	17	0	2	0	5	0	1	0	25	0
Manchester City	2023–24	Women's Super League	18	0	3	0	5	0	—		26	0
Manchester City	2024–25	Women's Super League	21	2	4	0	3	0	8	1	36	3
Manchester City	2025–26	Women's Super League	21	3	4	0	4	0	—		29	3
Manchester City	2026–27	Women's Super League	10	1	0	0	—		5	1	15	2
Manchester City	Total		87	6	13	0	17	0	14	2	131	8
Career total			220	19	16	0	26	2	18	2	280	23

=== International ===
As of match played 13 October 2026

Appearances and goals by national team and year
National team	Year	Apps	Goals
Netherlands	2021	3	0
Netherlands	2022	15	0
Netherlands	2023	14	0
Netherlands	2024	7	0
Netherlands	2025	12	0
Netherlands	2026	4	0
Total		55	0

== Honours ==
Manchester City

- Women's Super League: 2025–26
- Women's FA Cup: 2025–26

Twente

- Eredivisie: 2020–21, 2021–22
- Eredivisie Cup: 2021–22

Individual

- PFA WSL Team of the Year: 2025–26
