= Lily Murphy =

English footballer (born 2006)

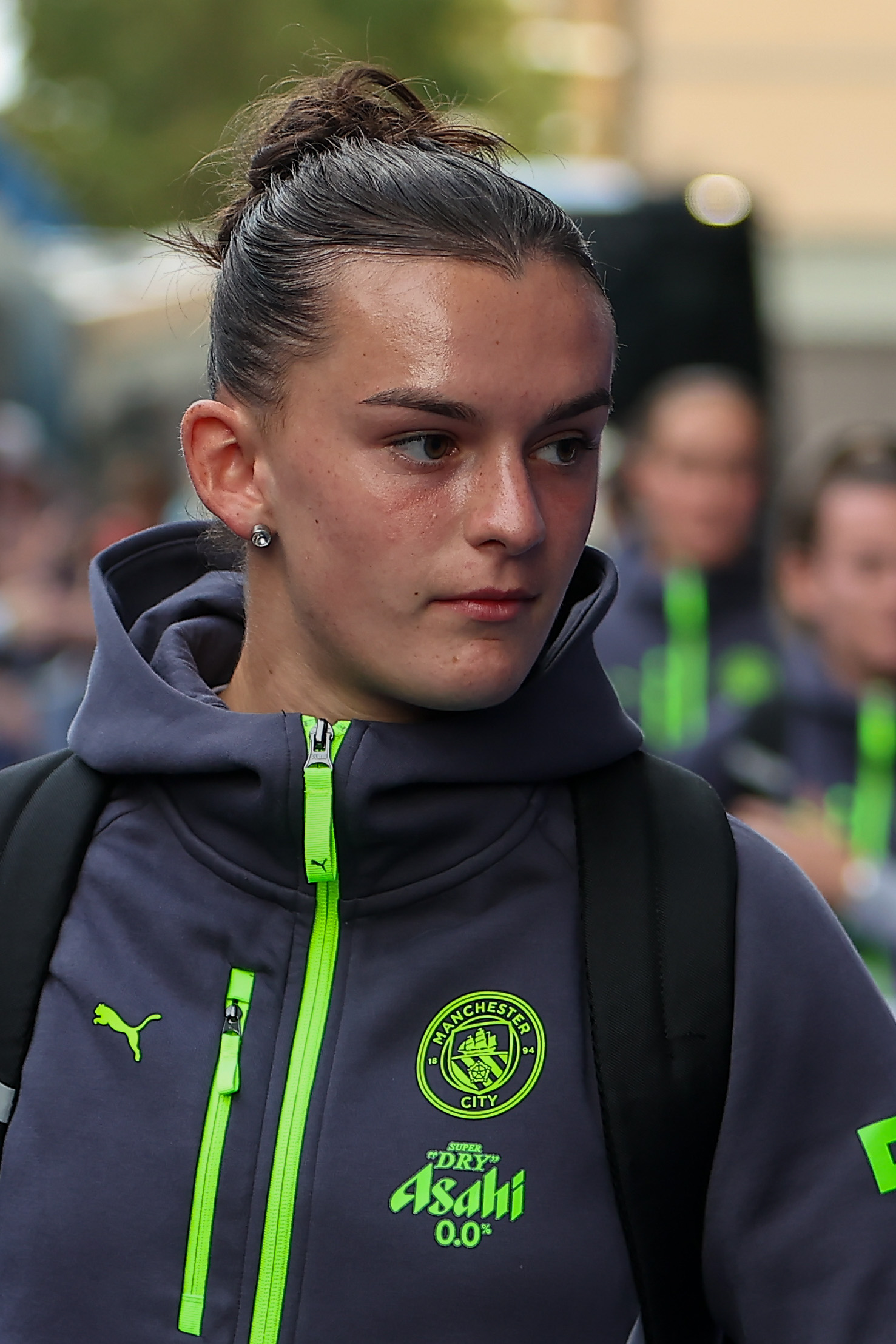
- Murphy in 2025

Personal information
- Full name: Lily Rose Murphy
- Date of birth: 13 February 2006 (age 20)
- Place of birth: Ashton-under-Lyne, Greater Manchester, England
- Position: Left winger

Team information
- Current team: Aston Villa (on loan from Manchester City)
- Number: 19

Youth career
- –2019: Manchester United
- 2019–2022: Blackburn Rovers
- 2022–2024: Manchester City

Senior career*
Years	Team	Apps	(Gls)
2023	→ Stockport County (loan)	3	(2)
2023–2024	→ AFC Fylde (loan)	11	(4)
2024	→ Stoke City (loan)	11	(1)
2024–	Manchester City	12	(0)
2026–	→ Aston Villa (loan)	8	(0)

International career^{‡}
2024–2025	England U19	8	(0)
2026–	England U20	2	(0)
- * Club domestic league appearances and goals as of 18:54, 22 November 2026 (UTC) ‡ National team caps and goals as of 23:47, 3 March 2026 (UTC)

Lily Rose Murphy (born 13 February 2006) is an English professional footballer who plays as a left winger for Women's Super League club Aston Villa, on loan from Manchester City, and the England under-20 national team.

== Youth career ==
Murphy began her youth career playing for Manchester United before moving to Blackburn Rovers under-14s in the Talent Pathway League, scoring 6 goals in 5 appearances. She has also represented England at youth level in athletics.

In 2022, she joined the Manchester City Academy; Murphy is a lifelong supporter of the club.

== Club career ==
=== Manchester City ===
==== Loan spells ====
In 2023 and 2024, Murphy underwent loan spells with National League Division One North side Stockport County and National League North sides AFC Fylde and Stoke City.

On 9 March 2023, Murphy made her debut for Stockport County. She scored two goals in her first three appearances for the team, before moving to National League North side AFC Fylde ahead of the 2023–24 season.

In January 2024, she moved to Stoke City (on dual registration with Manchester City) for the remainder of the 2023–24 season.

==== Return to City and senior team integration ====
On 1 September 2024, as part of a series of pre-season fixtures in Australia, Murphy featured as an 80th minute substitute in a 1–0 loss to Paris Saint-Germain.

On 18 September 2024, Murphy made her senior competitive debut in a 5–0 Champions League qualification victory against Paris FC. She signed her first professional contract with Manchester City in December 2024.

On 12 December 2024, Murphy scored her debut goal for the club in a 2–0 Champions League win against St. Pölten, helping the team to stay top of the group ahead of defending champions Barcelona. She was awarded player of the match.

On 27 August 2025, Murphy signed a new contract with the club, extending her club tenure until at least summer 2027.

In September 2025, Murphy suffered a shoulder injury in City's season opener, requiring her to undergo surgery. She returned to play three months later as an injury substitute for Bunny Shaw during City's 1–5 victory over West Ham. With Manchester City, she won the 2025-26 Women's Super League title.

==== Loan to Aston Villa ====
In August 2026, it was announced that Murphy would join Aston Villa on a season-long loan.

== International career ==
In February 2024, Murphy received her first call up to the England under-19 team (as a midfielder) for La Nucia tournament fixtures in Alicante. She featured as a substitute in a 3–2 defeat to France, and as part of the starting eleven in a 2–2 draw with Norway. In late 2024, she featured in U19 Championship qualification matches against Italy and Poland.

In February 2026, Murphy was called upon for the England under-20s, replacing Eleanor Klinger who was called up to the U23 squad. The following month, Murphy featured as a substitute in a 3–1 loss against Spain and 1–0 win over the Netherlands.

== Athletic career ==
Murphy has also represented England in youth level athletics.

In June 2024, she won the County Schools Championships in Greater Manchester, and narrowly missed a medal at the national finals.

== Career statistics ==
=== Club ===
As of match played 22 November 2026

Appearances and goals by club, season and competition
Club	Season	League			National cup (Note: Includes Women's FA Cup)		League cup (Note: Includes FA Women's National League Cup, FA Women's League Cup)		Continental (Note: Includes UEFA Women's Champions League)		Total	
Club	Season	Division	Apps	Goals	Apps	Goals	Apps	Goals	Apps	Goals	Apps	Goals
Stockport County (loan)	2022–23	National League Div. 1 North	3	2	0	0	0	0	—		3	2
AFC Fylde (loan)	2023–24	National League North	11	4	0	0	2	1	—		13	5
Stoke City (loan)	2023–24	National League North	11	1	0	0	0	0	—		11	1
Manchester City	2024–25	Women's Super League	11	0	3	0	1	1	5	1	20	2
Manchester City	2025–26	Women's Super League	1	0	3	0	1	0	0	0	5	0
Manchester City	Total		12	0	6	0	2	1	5	1	25	2
Aston Villa (loan)	2026–27	Women's Super League	8	0	0	0	5	2	—		13	2
Career total			45	7	6	0	9	4	5	1	65	12

== Honours ==
Manchester City

- Women's Super League: 2025–26
- Women's FA Cup: 2025–26
