= Eve Annets =

English footballer (born 2006)

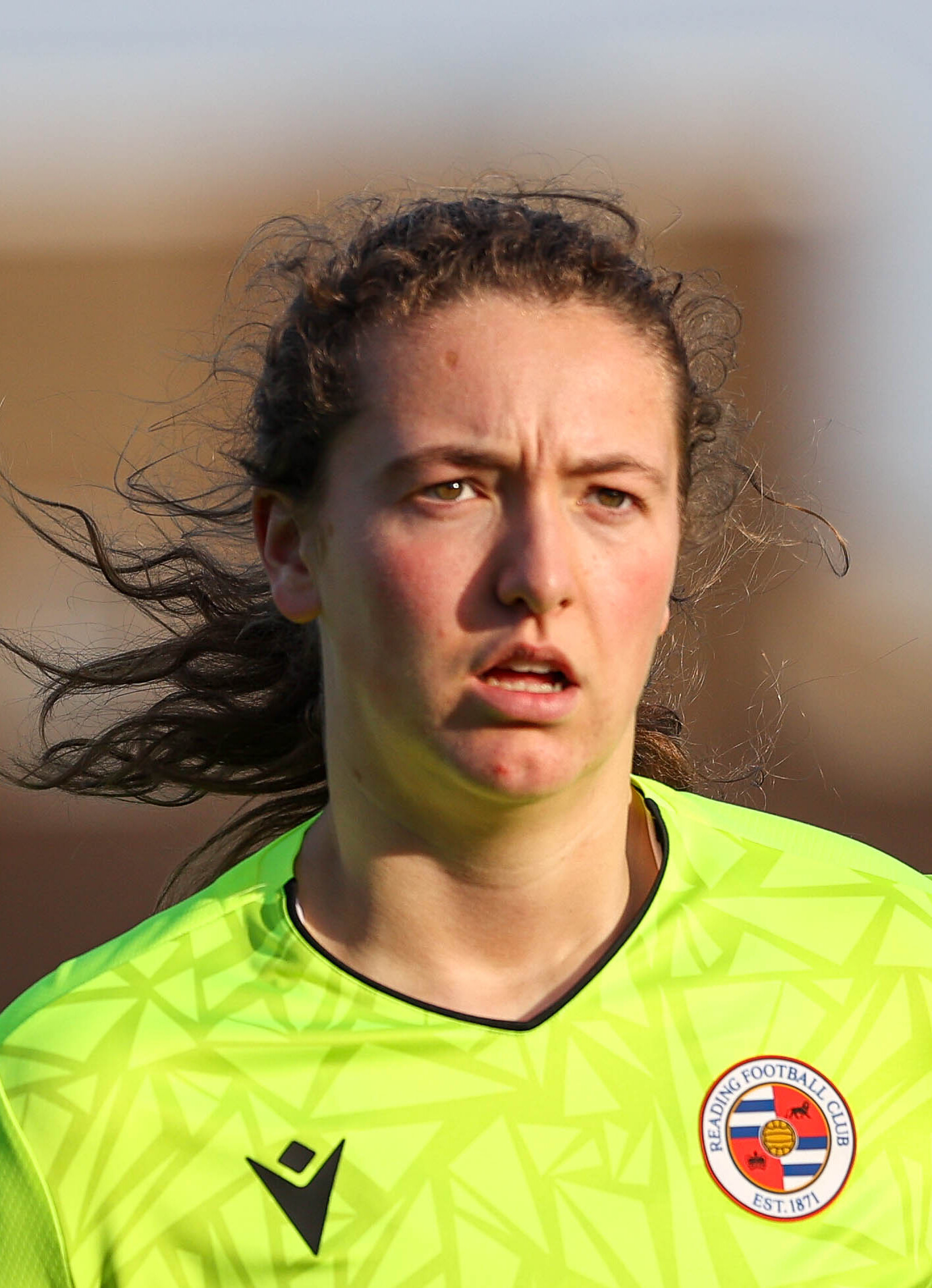
- Annets playing for Reading in 2024

Personal information
- Full name: Eve Catherine Annets
- Date of birth: 19 March 2006 (age 20)
- Place of birth: England
- Position: Goalkeeper

Team information
- Current team: Hibernian (on loan from Manchester City)

Youth career
- Royals Academy

Senior career*
| Years | Team | Apps | (Gls) |
| 2022–2024 | Reading | 1 | (0) |
| 2024– | Manchester City | 0 | (0) |
| 2024–2025 | → Portsmouth (loan) | 7 | (0) |
| 2025–2026 | → Crystal Palace (loan) | 0 | (0) |
| 2026– | → Hibernian (loan) | 0 | (0) |

International career^{‡}
| 2023–2025 | England U19 | 7 | (0) |
- * Club domestic league appearances and goals as of 23:48, 15 December 2024 (UTC) ‡ National team caps and goals as of 23:42, 8 April 2025 (UTC)

Eve Catherine Annets (born 19 March 2006) is an English professional footballer who plays as a goalkeeper for Scottish Women's Premier League club Hibernian, on loan from Women's Super League club Manchester City.

== Club career ==
On 11 October 2023, Annets made her professional debut for Reading in a League Cup group stage match against Tottenham Hostpur, resulting in a 6–0 defeat.

On 2 July 2024, Reading announced that Annets was one of 16 players to leave the club at the end of the 2023–24 season following the clubs withdrawal from the Women's Championship to the Southern Region Women's Football League.

On 5 August 2024, Manchester City announced the signing of Annets to a four-year contract. On 31 August 2024, Annets joined Portsmouth on loan for the 2024–25 season.

On 5 September 2025, Annets joined Crystal Palace on loan for the 2025–26 season.

On 21 August 2026, Annets joined Hibernian on a season-long loan.

== International career ==
On 20 September 2023 Annets made her debut for the England under-19s, keeping a clean sheet in an international friendly against Denmark in a 5–0 win. The following month she kept further clean sheets against Greece and Czech Republic during 2024 U19 Championship qualification. Annets was a member of the England squad at the 2025 UEFA Women's Under-19 Championship.

== Career statistics ==
As of match played 15 January 2025

Appearances and goals by club, season and competition
| Club | Season | League | | | National Cup | | League Cup | | Continental | | Other | | Total | |
| Club | Season | Division | Apps | Goals | Apps | Goals | Apps | Goals | Apps | Goals | Apps | Goals | Apps | Goals |
|---|---|---|---|---|---|---|---|---|---|---|---|---|---|---|
| Reading | 2023–24 | Women's Championship | 1 | 0 | 0 | 0 | 3 | 0 | — | | — | | 4 | 0 |
| Manchester City | 2024–25 | Women's Super League | 0 | 0 | 0 | 0 | 0 | 0 | 0 | 0 | — | | 0 | 0 |
| Portsmouth (loan) | 2024–25 | Women's Championship | 7 | 0 | 1 | 0 | 3 | 0 | — | | — | | 11 | 0 |
| Career total | | | 8 | 0 | 1 | 0 | 6 | 0 | 0 | 0 | 0 | 0 | 15 | 0 |
