= Gracie Prior =

English footballer (born 2004)

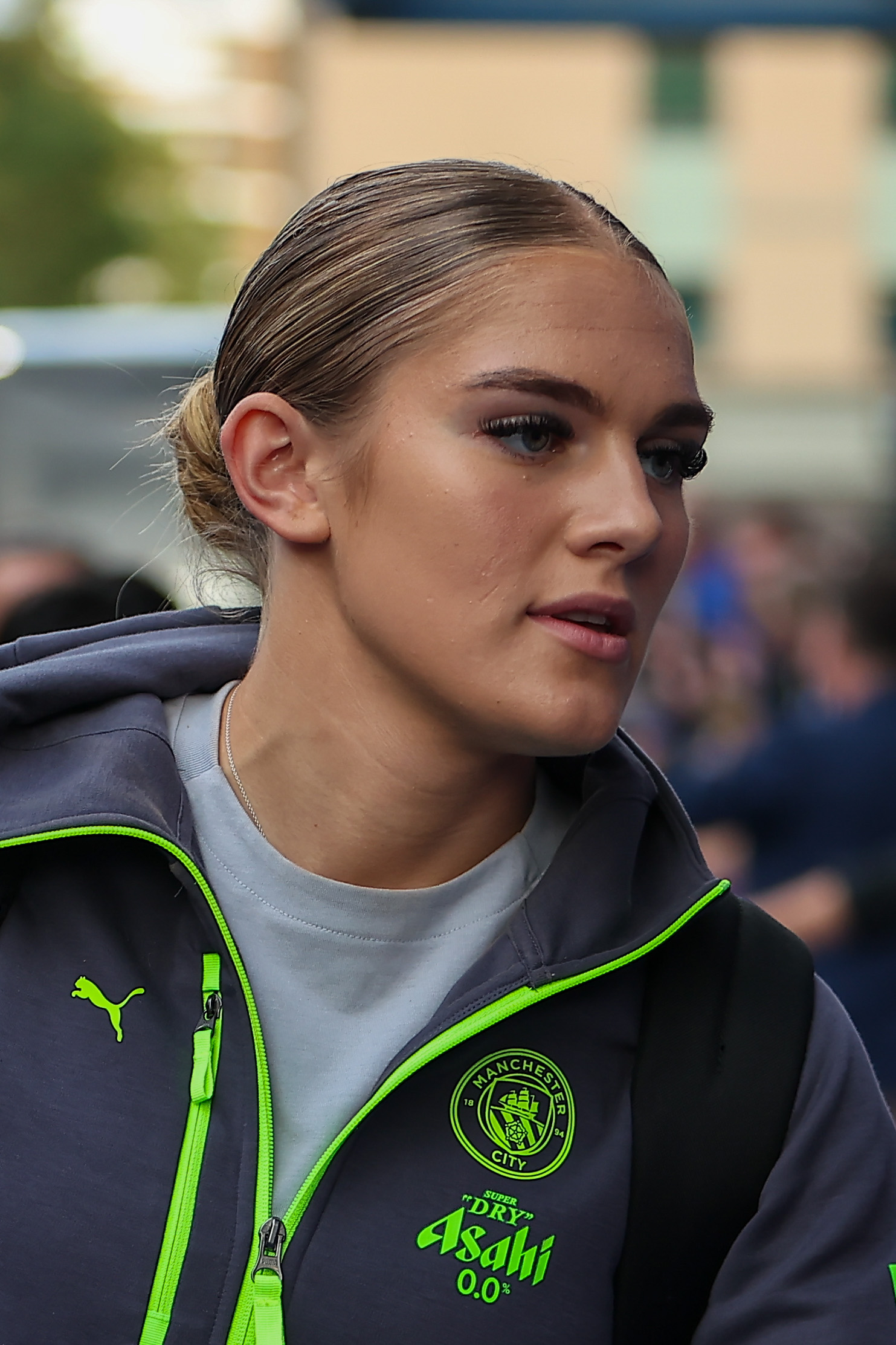
- Prior in 2025

Personal information
- Full name: Gracie Louise Prior
- Date of birth: 2 December 2004 (age 21)
- Place of birth: England
- Positions: Defender; midfielder

Team information
- Current team: Manchester City
- Number: 28

Youth career
- 2007–2012: Avro
- 2012–2022: Manchester City

Senior career*
Years	Team	Apps	(Gls)
2022–	Manchester City	19	(1)
2023	→ Brighouse Town (loan)	5	(0)
2023–2024	→ Burnley (loan)	14	(1)

International career^{‡}
2019	England U15	1	(0)
2021	England U19	1	(0)
2025–	England U23	3	(0)
- * Club domestic league appearances and goals as of 7 November 2026 ‡ National team caps and goals as of 23 October 2025

Gracie Louise Prior (born 2 December 2004) is an English professional footballer who plays as a defender and midfielder for Women's Super League club Manchester City and the England under-23s. Prior previously played on dual registration for National League North side Burnley.

== Youth career ==
Prior began her youth career with Avro under-7s girl team, prior to joining the Manchester City Academy under-12s in 2012. She went on to feature for the under-16s and the development team, making a total of 18 appearances for the latter, prior to joining the senior team.

== Club career ==
=== Manchester City ===
On 26 October 2022, as an 81st minute substitute, Prior made her senior debut for the first team in the 2022–23 FA Women's League Cup group match against Blackburn Rovers.

On 14 August 2024, aged 19, Prior signed for her first professional contract with Manchester City on a four-year deal. Two weeks later, she played in City's 2024–25 pre-season fixtures in Australia, featuring in the starting eleven for friendly against Leicester City. Goal.com described her as having good composure and instincts in the game, as one of the most significant emerging youth talents in the side.

On 3 November 2024, she made her WSL debut against Crystal Palace in a 3–0 victory, coming on as a 61st minute substitute. On 16 February 2025, she scored her debut goal for the team in a 4–0 win against Liverpool.

==== Burnley (dual registration) ====
On 8 October 2023, Prior joined National League North side Burnley on dual registration for the 2023–24 season, scoring one goal in fourteen appearances, while helping the side finish second place to become runners up of the league behind Newcastle United.

== International career ==
Between 2019 and 2021, Prior represented the England under-15s and England under-19s in friendly matches.

In March 2025, Prior was called up to the England under-23s. On 6 April, she made her debut for the youth team in a 2–1 win over Belgium.

== Style of play ==
As a defender, Prior plays as a centre-back or centre-half, as well as at right-back. According to Mundo Deportivo, she is recognized for her "commanding presence on the field and exceptional vision and skills".

== Honours ==
Manchester City

- Women's Super League: 2025–26
- Women's FA Cup: 2025–26

Burnley F.C.

- FA National League: 2023–24 runner-up
