= Mayzee Davies =

Wales international footballer (born 2006)

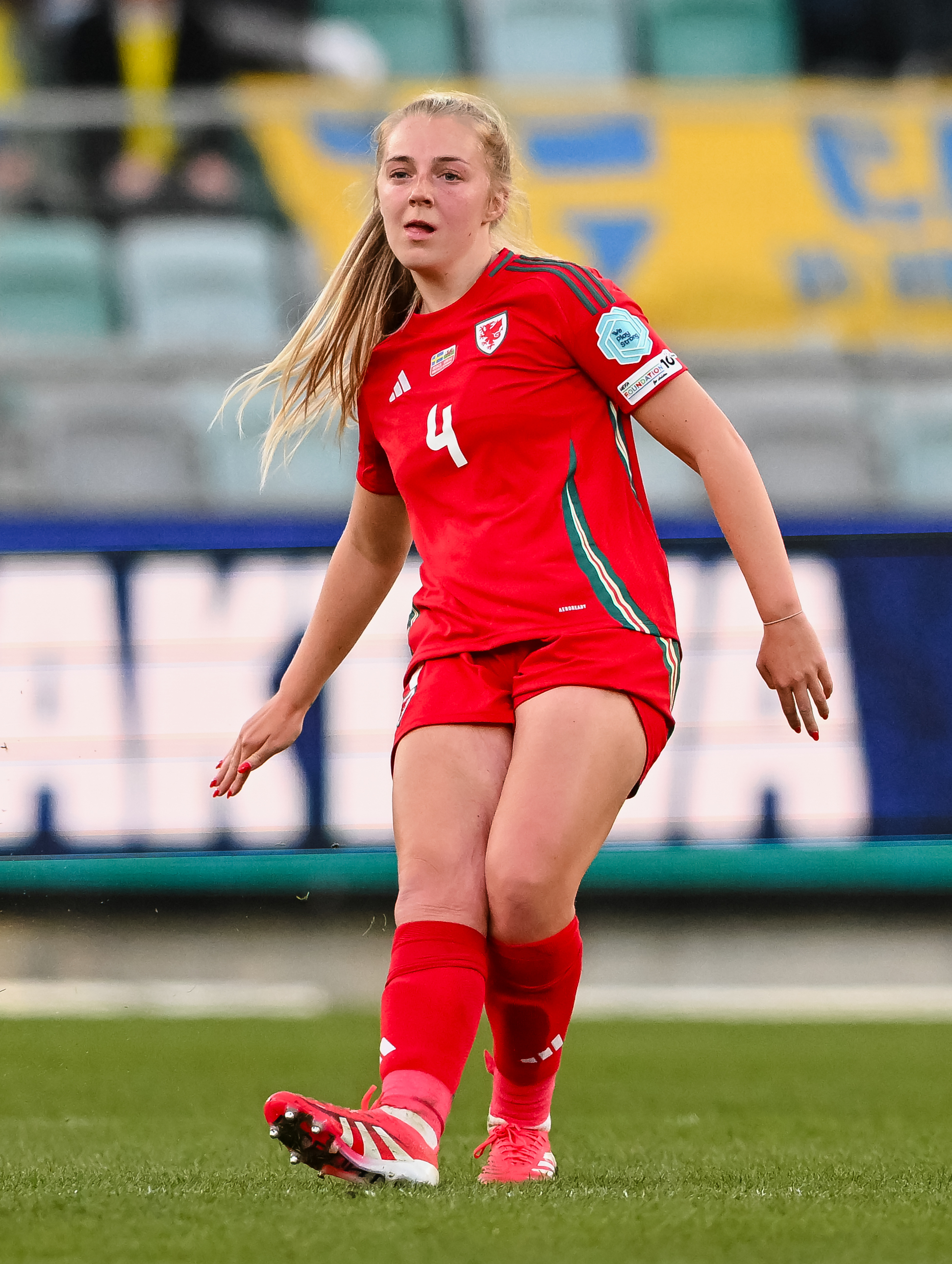
- Davies playing for Cymru against Sweden on 4 April 2025

Personal information
- Full name: Mayzee Julie Davies
- Date of birth: 25 August 2006 (age 20)
- Place of birth: Bodelwyddan, Wales
- Position: Defender

Team information
- Current team: Manchester City
- Number: 53

Youth career
- 2014–2015: Flint Town United
- 2015–2016: Llandudno
- 2016–2017: Everton
- 2017–2022: Manchester City
- 2022–2023: Manchester United

Senior career*
Years	Team	Apps	(Gls)
2023–2024	Manchester United	0	(0)
2023–2024	→ AFC Fylde (loan)	1	(0)
2024	→ Liverpool Feds (loan)	5	(0)
2024–	Manchester City	0	(0)
2024	→ Liverpool Feds (loan)	12	(0)

International career^{‡}
2022–2023	Wales U17	5	(0)
2023–	Wales U19	3	(0)
2024–	Wales	10	(1)
- * Club domestic league appearances and goals as of 23 May 2025 ‡ National team caps and goals as of 13 October 2026

Mayzee Julie Davies (born 25 August 2006) is a Welsh footballer who plays as a defender for Manchester City and the Wales national team.

== Club career ==
=== Youth ===
Davies grew up in Wales and played youth football from the age of seven for Flint Town United and Llandudno before joining the Everton academy aged nine. She moved to the academy at Manchester City the following season, spending five years with the club. In 2022, Davies joined Manchester United under-18s.

=== Manchester United ===
Davies was named to the travelling squad as part of the Manchester United senior team's midseason training camp in Malta in January 2024. As part of the camp she played the first half of a 2–1 friendly victory over PSV.

==== Loan spells ====
In December 2023, Davies joined AFC Fylde of the third-tier FA Women's National League Northern Premier Division on dual registration terms. She made two appearances, one in the league and another in the quarter-finals of the 2023–24 FA Women's National League Cup. On 10 March 2024, she returned to the WNL North on dual registration terms with Liverpool Feds, appearing five times for the club.

=== Manchester City ===
Manchester United released Davies upon the expiry of her contract in summer 2024. She signed with Manchester City in July 2024, and rejoined Liverpool Feds of the FA Women's National League North on dual registration the same month. She was named to a senior matchday squad for Manchester City the first time on 15 December 2024, for a WSL match against Everton.

== International career ==
=== Youth ===
Davies represented Wales at under-17 and under-19, appearing during 2023 UEFA Women's Under-17 Championship qualification and 2024 UEFA Women's Under-19 Championship qualification.

=== Senior ===
In February 2024, Davies received her first senior call-up for Wales from interim head coach Jon Grey for a friendly against the Republic of Ireland but was an unused substitute. She was recalled for the next window during UEFA Euro 2025 qualifying by new head coach Rhian Wilkinson and made her senior international debut on 9 April 2024, appearing as a 77th-minute substitute for Josie Green during Wales' 6–0 victory over Kosovo in Podujevë. She made a further two substitute appearances during qualifying as Wales reached the play-offs.

She currently has 6 caps for Cymru.

On 6 June 2025, it was confirmed Davies had suffered an Anterior cruciate ligament injury and would miss the Euro 2025.

Davies made her return to the Welsh national team 11 months after her ACL injury, being called up for 2027 World Cup qualifying matches against Albania in April 2026.

== Personal life ==
Davies' father, John, also played football, appearing as a defender for multiple Welsh Premier League teams. Mayzee enjoys going to watch her local football team, Flint Town United F.C. whenever she has free time or isn't playing football herself. Mayzee also enjoys going to watch local girls’ teams when she gets the chance.

== Career statistics ==
=== Club ===
As of match played 28 April 2024.

Appearances and goals by club, season and competition
Club	Season	League			FA Cup		League Cup (Note: Includes the FA Women's National League Cup)		Total	
Club	Season	Division	Apps	Goals	Apps	Goals	Apps	Goals	Apps	Goals
Manchester United	2023–24	WSL	0	0	0	0	0	0	0	0
AFC Fylde (loan)	2023–24	WNL North	1	0	0	0	1	0	2	0
Liverpool Feds (loan)	2023–24	WNL North	5	0	0	0	0	0	5	0
Liverpool Feds (loan)	2024–25	WNL North	12	0	2	0	0	0	14	0
Liverpool Feds (loan)	Total		17	0	2	0	0	0	19	0
Career total			6	0	0	0	1	0	21	0

=== International ===
Statistics accurate as of match played 13 October 2026.

Wales
Year	Apps	Goals
2024	3	0
2025	3	0
2026	4	1
Total	10	1

List of international goals scored by Mayzee Davies
No.	Date	Venue	Opponent	Score	Result	Competition
1.	13 October 2026	Parc y Scarlets, Llanelli, Wales	Albania	1–0	3–0	2027 FIFA Women's World Cup qualification play-offs
