= Manchester City W.F.C. =

Women's football club in Manchester, England

Manchester City Women
- Full name: Manchester City Women's Football Club
- Nicknames: The Citizens, The Blues, City, Man City
- Founded: November 1988; 38 years ago
- Ground: Joie Stadium
- Capacity: 7,000 (5,000 seated)
- Coordinates: 53°28′53″N 2°11′34″W
- Owner: City Football Group Limited
- Chairman: Khaldoon Al Mubarak
- Manager: Andrée Jeglertz
- League: Women's Super League
- 2025–26: WSL, 1st of 12 (champions)
- Website: mancity.com/mcwfc
Home colours	Away colours	Third colours

Manchester City Women's Football Club (formerly Manchester City Ladies F.C.) is an English women's football club based in Manchester who play in the Women's Super League. The club is affiliated with Premier League team Manchester City.

== History ==
=== National League ===
==== 1988–1996: Early struggles ====
Manchester City Ladies Football Club was formed in November 1988, the brainchild of Manchester City Community Officer Neil Mather – who would become the side's first manager – plus several others involved in the club's community scheme. Their first match was a friendly against Oldham on Boundary Park's artificial pitch, which City won by a score of 4–1. Only able to play friendlies in their first season due to the late formation of the club, the team joined the North West Women's Regional Football League the following year. Their first competitive league match took place on Sunday September 3rd 1989, where they played Chorley Ladies FC (now known as Chorley Women FC) at Astley Park and lost 11-0. In the hopes of increasing publicity for women's football, the Manchester City's men's first team defender Colin Hendry was appointed Club President in March 1990 during a period when it was receiving plaudits for being one of the first league clubs in north-west England to create an affiliated women's side.

Manchester City Ladies initially struggled with the strength of the opposition in their first league fixtures, having been immediately placed in the second division of four due to the strength of the club's name alone, but managed to improve results enough to finish mid-table. In their second season, they improved further and consequently achieved their first promotion.

Although Manchester City Ladies established itself in the top division of the North West Women's Regional Football League, a lack of financial independence meant that the club's fortunes were tied to the men's side, resulting in a first relegation in 1996–97, the season after the men's team themselves were relegated from the Premier League. The club's support for their ladies' team was reduced, poor conditions at Platt Lane caused a series of fixture postponements and a shortage of players resulted in discussions on whether to merge the ladies' team into Stockport County Ladies.

==== 1997–2013: Growing strength ====
Manchester City's relegation coincided with the reorganisation of the club spearheaded by Derek Heath, a Stockport County Ladies coach who had transferred to the Manchester club owing to Stockport County Ladies' reluctance to affiliate with the male side of the same name. Heath brought in a raft of new players – many directly from Stockport – and created the first-ever junior side when he arranged for Manchester City to adopt the Stockport under-14 team which his former club were no longer in a position to support. Although Heath was to die after a brief battle with cancer barely a year after joining the club, Manchester City went unbeaten in the league throughout the 1997–98 season to win the second division title at the first time of asking – their first official silverware.

Promotion in 1998 would start a period of success for Manchester City. After narrowly missing out on a second promotion in 1999, they won the Premier Division in 1999–2000 and beat Barnsley in the promotion play-off to lift themselves above the North West Regional Football League for the first time. The following season they won the Northern Combination and joined the WFA National League (renamed the Women's Premier League in 1992) Northern Division. The step up to the WPL proved to be a large one, however, and the club narrowly avoided relegation on several occasions, never finishing outside of the bottom half for the first seven seasons. Only the appointment of Leigh Wood to the managerial position in 2007 was able to change the club from relegation battlers to title hopefuls.

=== Women's Super League ===
==== 2014–2015: Professionalism and early success ====
The English women's football pyramid was shaken up again in 2010 when the FA Women's Super League was created as a new top-tier competition to sit over the top of the Women's Premier League. The FA announced that entry would be based on application rather than promotion and that all members of the WPL National Division plus the top two finishers in the two regional leagues would be eligible to apply. Manchester City would miss out on the opportunity, instead finishing fourth, but would seize their next opportunity to join the WSL some three seasons later when it was expanded into an 18-team, two-tiered league system - by which time the club had won the Northern Division and were contesting the National Division. To some surprise and controversy on 26 April City Ladies were announced to have been given direct entry to the first division of the enlarged competition, at the expense of established team Doncaster Rovers Belles who were downgraded to the second division and were the only team to lose their top division status.

In anticipation of their first WSL season the club began a complete renovation of the playing squad, signing a number of England internationals and promising players, including the likes of England goalkeeper Karen Bardsley, 74-times capped midfielder Jill Scott and new club captain Steph Houghton, intending to make an impression on the league from the start. On 23 January 2014, the club was relaunched with a minor renaming to Manchester City Women's Football Club, ready for the new season. Nick Cushing was appointed first team manager, with Leigh Wood moving to first team head coach.

Their first season of professional football would see Manchester City finish fifth of eight teams, at the same time winning their first-ever major trophy when they defeated Arsenal in the 2014 FA WSL Cup Final. The following season would start poorly, but City Women returned from the summer break for the Women's World Cup a different side, with England's third-place finish seemingly rejuvenating both players and fans. Recording twelve wins in their remaining thirteen league games the club entered a title challenge which they only lost on the final day of the season. Although it brought them no silverware, their runners-up position was enough to secure them European football for the first time in their history. As they embarked on their late-season surge, City also broke the league attendance record not once but twice.

==== 2016–2020: Domestic dominance and Big Three ====
The following seasons would see Manchester City become one of the dominant sides of English women's football, winning the league in 2016 and claiming two Women's FA Cup and two further WSL Cups by the end of the decade.

==== 2020–2023: Injury crises, exodus and Big Four ====
Nick Cushing left his role as manager to become assistant coach to Ronny Deila at MLS side New York City, with his last match being against Arsenal on 2 February 2020. Gareth Taylor took over as manager, having a good start in his first year with the squad.

The side saw various injuries to many of its first-team players from 2021 and into the 2021–22 season, struggling at times domestically and particularly in Europe. It has been compared to the 2015 injury crisis that saw City under Cushing spring a late comeback and then dominates in 2016.

Over the summer of 2022, Manchester City saw nine of its high-profile and established players leave: Bardsley, Scott, and Ellen White through retirement; Janine Beckie to Portland Thorns; Karima Benameur Taieb to Marseille; Lucy Bronze and Keira Walsh to Barcelona; Caroline Weir to Real Madrid; and Georgia Stanway to Bayern Munich. Described as an exodus from the club, sports journalists questioned if the draw of European football was the only factor in big name departures, as well as debating the resilience of a club with so many new faces arriving at once and the "entire, world class starting midfield three" leaving. The last to leave was Walsh, for a world-record transfer fee on 7 September; her departure from Manchester City (after the retirements of Bardsley and Scott) meant that Houghton was the last remaining 2014 season player at the club.

Sources close to the club cited by The Athletic felt that reasons for most of the departures were not individually concerning, besides that "last season's results were below what the club expected, and some players were not happy with the feedback received from the backroom staff". However, the high number of departures at once and the club's seeming lack of sufficient recruitment to cover the calibre of these players were seen as potential matters of concern, with fans decrying the management on social media. The Sportsman also worried that losing so many starting players would make the club's evolution under Taylor less visible and effective.

After a rough start to the 2022–23 season, including a first-ever loss to Aston Villa in their first league match, Manchester City re-found their footing and took enough wins to end 2022 fourth in the league, unable to defeat any of the other "Big Four" (the Big Three and newly improved rivals Manchester United) teams but holding strong to retain a position among the title contenders, with the new signings said to have gelled surprisingly quickly. Despite the regained form, following Manchester City defeating Leicester City by the usual wide margin in October 2022, ESPN felt that the team had "a certain sparkle lacking from their football, and the unquenchable je ne sais quoi the top teams manage to cultivate through their star-studded teams remained absent", again asking if Taylor would be able to bring the team silverware.

==== 2023–2026: Return to form ====
The following 2023–24 season, Manchester City finished equal in points with long-standing champions Chelsea, losing the title to them on goal difference alone. The next season saw a handful of injuries to their first squad, which saw them out of European competition early and unable to land a spot for next year. Bouncing back, during the 2025–26 season they have been back to form. In particular, they defeated Chelsea at home 5–1 in a match where Manchester City was described as "ruthless" on the pitch. The game also featured the first hat-trick against Chelsea in history, by Brazilian forward Kerolin.

== Stadium ==
Since the opening of Academy Stadium directly across the Ashton New Road and Alan Turing Way from the City of Manchester Stadium, Manchester City Women have been based at the training complex's 7,000-capacity stadium in tandem with the men's academy's senior side. The stadium has on three occasions since the middle of 2015 set an attendance record for a FA WSL league game.

Prior to moving into Academy Stadium, the women's side was based in the Manchester Regional Athletics Arena.

On 14 September 2023, Manchester City announced Joie as the official stadium naming partner.

== Affiliation with Manchester City F.C. ==
Throughout their history, MCWFC has had an affiliation with Manchester City, being established within its corporate structure in 1988. Replica kits of the men's team were still worn and the professional side financially supported the team, yet organisationally it managed itself for much of its existence. They were established as part of City in the Community in 1988 with its development during the 1990s and beyond relying on the dedication of a number of Manchester City Ladies officials, individuals and volunteers.

Following an announcement on 28 August 2012, Manchester City Ladies' position as an official part of the club became formalised under a new agreement. Consequently, the women's side shares not only corporate links and resources with the male team but also their training facilities, as well as being included in the marketing and social media of the Premier League side.

== Players ==
=== First-team squad ===
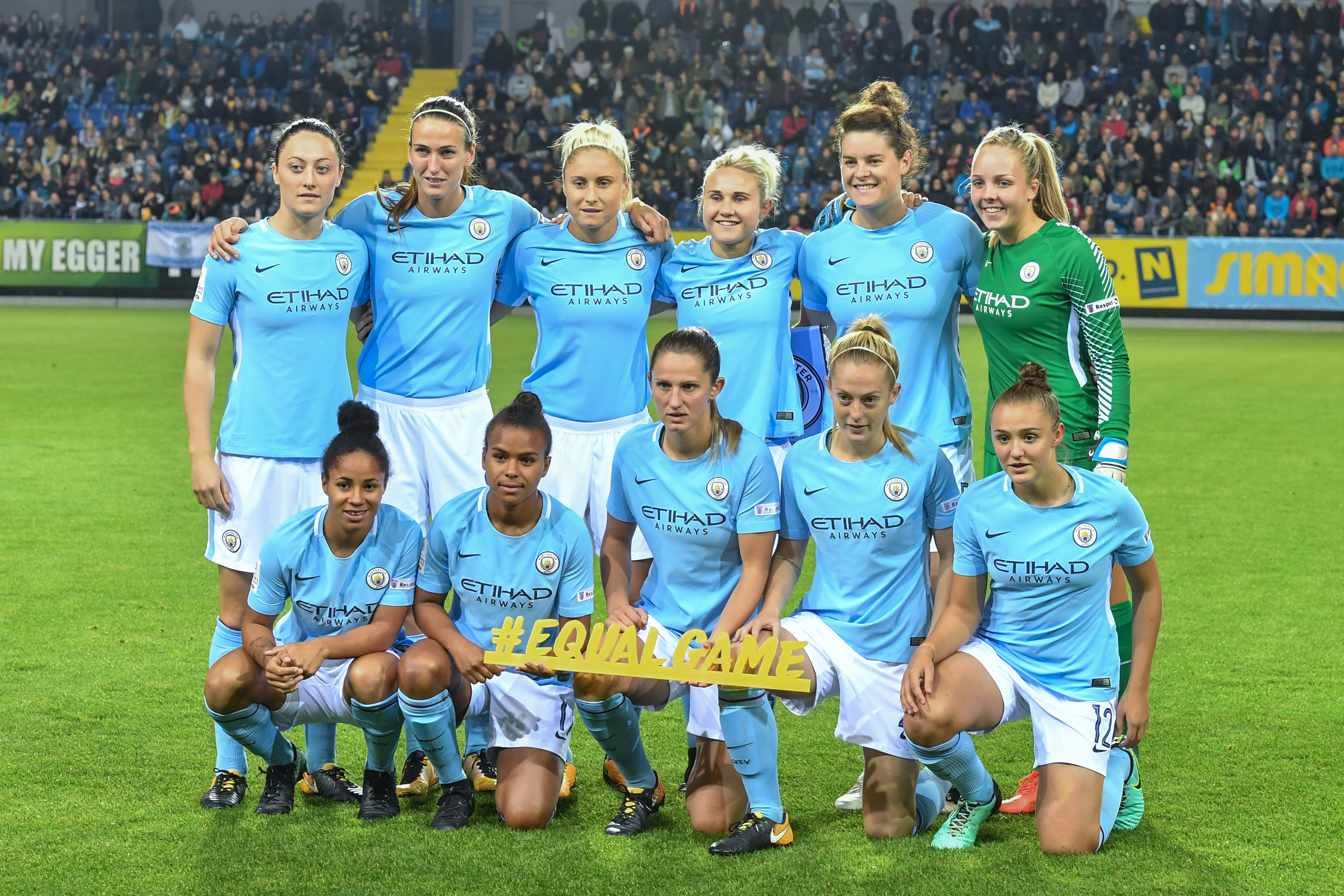
A photo of the first-team before a Champions League match against SKN St. Pölten on 4 October 2017

As of 3 September 2026

Note: Flags indicate national team as defined under FIFA eligibility rules; some limited exceptions apply. Players may hold more than one non-FIFA nationality.

No.	Pos.	Nation	Player
1	GK	SCO	Eartha Cumings
2	DF	JPN	Risa Shimizu
4	DF	CAN	Jade Rose
5	DF	ENG	Alex Greenwood (captain)
6	MF	ENG	Grace Clinton
7	FW	ENG	Beth Mead
8	FW	AUS	Mary Fowler
9	FW	JAM	Khadija Shaw (4th captain)
10	FW	NED	Vivianne Miedema
11	FW	ENG	Lauren Hemp (3rd captain)
13	DF	AUT	Laura Wienroither
14	GK	ENG	Anna Moorhouse (on loan from Orlando Pride)
17	MF	USA	Sam Coffey
18	DF	NED	Kerstin Casparij (vice-captain)

No.	Pos.	Nation	Player
19	MF	ENG	Laura Blindkilde Brown
20	FW	JPN	Aoba Fujino
21	DF	ENG	Niamh Charles
22	MF	GER	Sydney Lohmann
24	FW	SUI	Iman Beney
25	MF	JPN	Yui Hasegawa
27	DF	GER	Rebecca Knaak
28	DF	ENG	Gracie Prior
31	GK	JPN	Ayaka Yamashita
37	DF	GER	Carlotta Wamser
41	MF	IRL	Aoibhe Brennan
47	DF	ENG	Sacha Lewis
53	DF	WAL	Mayzee Davies
54	MF	SCO	Amelia Oldroyd
57	FW	ENG	Freya Hirons
60	FW	ENG	Millie Burdon

=== Out on loan ===
Note: Flags indicate national team as defined under FIFA eligibility rules; some limited exceptions apply. Players may hold more than one non-FIFA nationality.

No.	Pos.	Nation	Player
3	DF	ENG	Naomi Layzell (at Everton until 30 June 2027)
44	DF	ENG	Codie Thomas (at Nottingham Forest until 30 June 2027)

No.	Pos.	Nation	Player
46	FW	ENG	Lily Murphy (at Aston Villa until 30 June 2027)
12	GK	ENG	Eve Annets (at Hibernian until 30 June 2027)

=== Former players ===
For details of current and former players, see Category:Manchester City W.F.C. players.

== Honours ==
=== Leagues ===
- FA Women's Super League (Level 1)
  - Winners (2): 2016, 2025–26
  - Runners-up (7): 2015, 2017, 2017–18, 2018–19, 2019–20, 2020–21, 2023–24
- FA Women's National League North (Level 3)
  - Winners: 2011–12
- Northern Combination Women's Football League (Level 3)
  - Winners: 2000–01
- North West Women's Regional Football League Premier Division (Level 4)
  - Winners: 1999–2000
  - Runners-up: 1998–99
- North West Women's Regional Football League Division Two (Level 4)
  - Winners : 1997–98

=== Cups ===
- Women's FA Cup
  - Winners: 2016–17, 2018–19, 2019–20, 2025–26
  - Runners-up: 2021–22
- FA Women's League Cup
  - Winners: 2014, 2016, 2018–19, 2021–22
  - Runners-up: 2017–18, 2024–25
- North West Challenge Trophy
  - Winners: 1999–2000
- North West League Cup
  - Winners: 1999–2000

=== Doubles ===
- Doubles
  - 2016: League and League Cup
  - 2018–19: FA Cup and League Cup
  - 2025–26: League and FA Cup

== Season to season record (since 2014) ==
Season	League									FA Cup	League Cup	Europe	Other		Top scorer(s)	Goals
Season	Division (tier)	P	W	D	L	F	A	Pts	Pos	FA Cup	League Cup	Europe	Competition	Result	Top scorer(s)	Goals
2014	WSL 1 (1)	14	6	1	7	13	16	19	5th	QF	W				Toni Duggan	11
2015	WSL 1 (1)	14	9	3	2	25	11	30	2nd	SF	QF				Toni Duggan	12
2016	WSL 1 (1)	16	13	3	0	36	4	42	1st	SF	W	Ro16			Jane Ross	13
2017	WSL SS (1)	8	6	1	1	17	6	19	2nd	W		SF			Lucy Bronze; Jill Scott; Toni Duggan	4
2017–18	WSL 1 (1)	18	12	2	4	51	17	38	2nd	SF	RU	SF			Nikita Parris	18
2018–19	WSL 1 (1)	20	14	5	1	53	17	47	2nd	W	W	Ro32			Nikita Parris	24
2019–20	WSL 1 (1)	16	13	1	2	39	9	40	2nd	W	SF	Ro16			Pauline Bremer	22
2020–21	WSL 1 (1)	22	17	4	1	65	13	55	2nd	SF	QF	QF	Community Shield	RU	Chloe Kelly; Ellen White	15
2021–22	WSL 1 (1)	22	15	2	5	60	32	47	3rd	RU	W	2QR			Lauren Hemp	10
2022–23	WSL 1 (1)	22	15	2	5	50	25	47	4th	QF	SF	1QR			Khadija Shaw	31
2023–24	WSL 1 (1)	22	18	1	3	61	15	55	2nd	QF	SF				Khadija Shaw	22
2024–25	WSL 1 (1)	22	13	4	5	49	28	43	4th	SF	RU	QF			Khadija Shaw	19
2025–26	WSL 1 (1)	22	18	1	3	62	19	55	1st	W	SF				Khadija Shaw	21

Champions	Runners-up

== Record in UEFA Women's Champions League ==
All results (home, away and aggregate) list Manchester City's goal tally first.

Season	Round	Club	Home	Away	Aggregate
2016–17	Round of 32	(Russia) Zvezda Perm	2–0 ^{f}	4–0	6–0
2016–17	Round of 16	(Denmark) Brøndby	1–0 ^{f}	1–1	2–1
2016–17	Quarter-final	(Denmark) Fortuna Hjørring	1–0	1–0 ^{f}	2–0
2016–17	Semi-final	(France) Olympique Lyon	1–3 ^{f}	1–0	2–3
2017–18	Round of 32	(Austria) St. Pölten	3–0	3–0 ^{f}	6–0
2017–18	Round of 16	(Norway) Lillestrøm	2–1	5–0 ^{f}	7–1
2017–18	Quarter-final	(Sweden) Linköping	2–0 ^{f}	5–3	7–3
2017–18	Semi-final	(France) Olympique Lyon	0–0 ^{f}	0–1	0–1
2018–19	Round of 32	(Spain) Atlético Madrid	0–2	1–1 ^{f}	1–3
2019–20	Round of 32	(Switzerland) Lugano	4–0	7–1 ^{f}	11–1
2019–20	Round of 16	(Spain) Atlético Madrid	1–1 ^{f}	1–2	2–3
2020–21	Round of 32	(Sweden) Kopparbergs/Göteborg	3–0	2–1 ^{f}	5–1
2020–21	Round of 16	(Italy) Fiorentina	3–0 ^{f}	5–0	8–0
2020–21	Quarter-finals	(Spain) Barcelona	2–1	0–3 ^{f}	2–4
2021–22	Second qualifying round	(Spain) Real Madrid	0–1	1–1 ^{f}	1–2
2022–23	First qualifying round	(Kazakhstan) Tomiris-Turan	6–0		
2022–23	First qualifying round	(Spain) Real Madrid	0–1		
2024–25	Second qualifying round	(France) Paris FC	3–0	5–0 ^{f}	8–0
2024–25	Group D	(Spain) Barcelona	2–0 ^{f}	0–3	2nd
2024–25	Group D	(Austria) St. Pölten	2–0	3–2 ^{f}	2nd
2024–25	Group D	(Sweden) Hammarby	2–0 ^{f}	2–1	2nd
2024–25	Quarter-finals	(England) Chelsea	2–0 ^{f}	0–3	2–3

^{f} First leg

== Current technical staff ==
As of 27 May 2026

Name	Job Title
(England) Charlotte O'Neill	Managing Director
(Sweden) Therese Sjögran	Sporting Director
(Sweden) Andrée Jeglertz	Manager
(Sweden) Anders Bengtsson	Assistant Manager
(Wales) Lauren Smith	Assistant Manager
(United States) Diego Restrepo	Goalkeeper Coach

== Managers ==
Dates	Name
1988–?	(England) Neil Mather
1997	(England) Derek Heath
2007–2013	(England) Leigh Wood
2013–2020	(England) Nick Cushing
2020	(Republic of Ireland) Alan Mahon (interim)
2020–2025	(Wales) Gareth Taylor
2025	(England) Nick Cushing (interim)
2025–	(Sweden) Andrée Jeglertz

== Records ==
- Record attendance: 44,259
  (vs. Manchester United, 11 December 2022)
