= 2026 Women's FA Cup final =

English football cup final

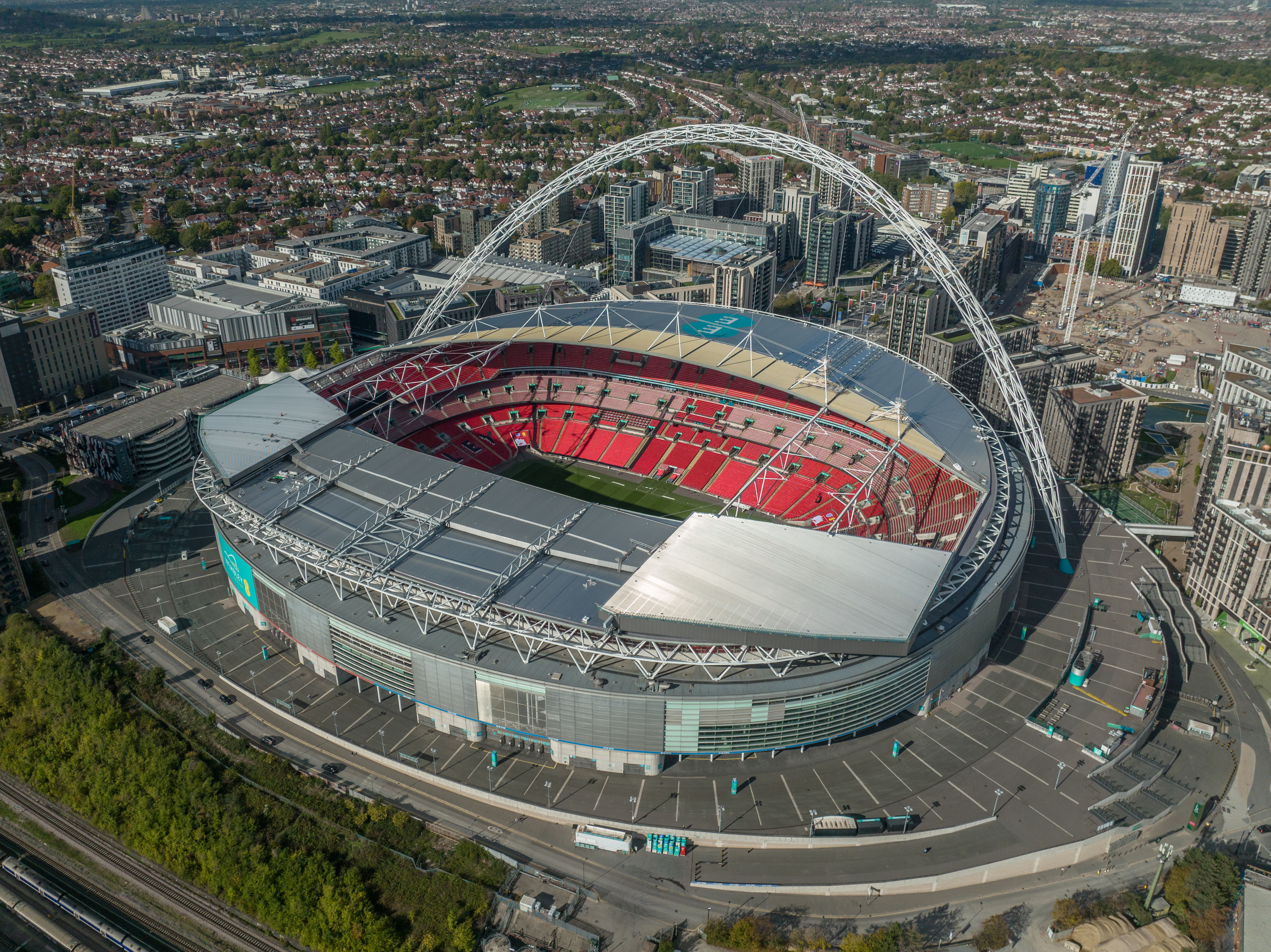
- Wembley Stadium hosted the final
- Event: 2025–26 Women's FA Cup
Brighton & Hove Albion	Manchester City
0	4
- Date: 31 May 2026
- Venue: Wembley Stadium, London
- Referee: Melissa Burgin (Manchester)
- Attendance: 43,917

The 2026 Women's FA Cup final was the 56th final of the Women's FA Cup, England's primary cup competition for women's football teams. The showpiece event was the 32nd to be played directly under the auspices of The Football Association and was named the Adobe Women's FA Cup final due to sponsorship reasons.

The match was contested between Brighton & Hove Albion and Manchester City. This was Brighton & Hove Albion's first ever women's cup final, while Manchester City chased a domestic double after they won the Women's Super League (WSL).

== Match ==
=== Details ===
31 May 2026
15:00 BST

Brighton & Hove Albion	0–4	Manchester City
	Report	Shaw 38'; Greenwood 45+6'; Fujino 66'; Miedema 87'

Wembley Stadium, London
Attendance: 43,917
Referee: Melissa Burgin (Manchester)

Brighton & Hove Albion	Manchester City

GK	1	(Nigeria) Chiamaka Nnadozie
RB	33	(Australia) Charlize Rule	(substituted off) 71'
CB	18	(Republic of Ireland) Caitlin Hayes
CB	3	(Japan) Moeka Minami
LB	2	(Colombia) Manuela Vanegas
RM	11	(Japan) Kiko Seike	(substituted off) 71'
CM	8	(England) Maisie Symonds (c)	(substituted off) 88'
CM	10	(Serbia) Jelena Čanković
LM	19	(Netherlands) Marisa Olislagers	(substituted off) 79'
AM	14	(England) Fran Kirby	(substituted off) 80'
CF	21	(United States) Madison Haley
Substitutes:
GK	32	(England) Sophie Baggaley
DF	5	(France) Maelys Mpomé	(substituted on) 71'
DF	27	(Scotland) Rachel McLauchlan	(substituted on) 79'
MF	15	(Netherlands) Nadine Noordam	(substituted on) 80'
MF	29	(Japan) Fūka Tsunoda
FW	6	(Sweden) Rosa Kafaji	(substituted on) 71'
FW	17	(England) Bex Rayner	(substituted on) 88'
FW	20	(Norway) Olaug Tvedten
FW	22	(Spain) Carla Camacho
Manager:
(Australia) Dario Vidošić

GK	31	(Japan) Ayaka Yamashita
RB	18	(Netherlands) Kerstin Casparij
CB	4	(Canada) Jade Rose
CB	27	(Germany) Rebecca Knaak	(yellow card) 54'
LB	5	(England) Alex Greenwood (c)
CM	19	(England) Laura Blindkilde Brown		(substituted off) 77'
CM	25	(Japan) Yui Hasegawa
RW	14	(Brazil) Kerolin		(substituted off) 61'
AM	6	(England) Grace Clinton		(substituted off) 61'
LW	11	(England) Lauren Hemp		(substituted off) 77'
CF	9	(Jamaica) Khadija Shaw		(substituted off) 85'
Substitutes:
GK	1	(Scotland) Eartha Cumings
DF	15	(Spain) Leila Ouahabi
DF	28	(England) Gracie Prior
MF	7	(England) Laura Coombs		(substituted on) 85'
MF	22	(Germany) Sydney Lohmann		(substituted on) 77'
FW	8	(Australia) Mary Fowler		(substituted on) 77'
FW	10	(Netherlands) Vivianne Miedema		(substituted on) 61'
FW	20	(Japan) Aoba Fujino		(substituted on) 61'
FW	46	(England) Lily Murphy
Manager:
(Sweden) Andrée Jeglertz

Assistant referees:
Anastasiya Voloshchuk (London)
Leoni Harland (Manchester)
Fourth official:
Phoebe Cross (Derbyshire)
Reserve assistant:
Ruby Sykes (Cheshire)
Video assistant referee:
Paul Howard (Northamptonshire)
Assistant video assistant referee:
Neil Davies (London)

Match rules
- 90 minutes
- 30 minutes of extra time if necessary
- Penalty shoot-out if scores still level
- Nine named substitutes
- Maximum of five substitutions, with a sixth allowed in extra time
