= 2025–26 Brighton & Hove Albion W.F.C. season =

Brighton & Hove Albion
2025–26 season
- Chairman: Tony Bloom
- Manager: Dario Vidošić
- Stadium: Broadfield Stadium, Crawley
- Women's Super League: 7th
- FA Cup: Runners-up
- League Cup: Group stage
- Top goalscorer: League: Kiko Seike (8 goals); All: Kiko Seike (11 goals)
- Highest home attendance: 6,749 (vs Tottenham Hotspur, 16 May 2026) at Falmer Stadium; 4,450 (vs Arsenal, 6 May 2026) at Broadfield Stadium
- Lowest home attendance: 1,722 (vs Everton, 28 September 2025) at Broadfield Stadium
- Average home league attendance: 3,184
- Biggest win: 4–1 vs West Ham (H) (WSL – 21 September 2025); 3–0 vs Southampton (H) (League Cup – 19 October 2025); 4–1 vs Leicester City (H) (WSL – 16 November 2025)
- Biggest defeat: 0–4 vs Manchester City (N) (FA Cup – 31 May 2026)
Home colours	Away colours	Third colours
- All statistics correct as of 31 May 2026.

The 2025–26 Brighton & Hove Albion W.F.C. season was the club's 35th season in existence and their eighth in the Women's Super League, the highest level of the football pyramid. Along with competing in the WSL, the club competed in two domestic cup competitions: the FA Cup and the League Cup. They reached the FA Cup final for the first time.

== Squad ==
Note: Flags indicate national team as defined under FIFA eligibility rules; some limited exceptions apply. Players may hold more than one non-FIFA nationality.

No.	Pos.	Nation	Player
1	GK	NGA	Chiamaka Nnadozie
2	DF	COL	Manuela Vanegas
3	DF	JPN	Moeka Minami
5	DF	FRA	Maelys Mpomé
6	FW	SWE	Rosa Kafaji (on loan from Arsenal)
7	FW	TAN	Aisha Masaka
8	MF	ENG	Maisie Symonds (captain)
10	MF	SRB	Jelena Čanković
11	FW	JPN	Kiko Seike
14	FW	ENG	Fran Kirby
15	MF	NED	Nadine Noordam
17	MF	ENG	Bex Rayner

No.	Pos.	Nation	Player
18	DF	IRL	Caitlin Hayes
19	DF	NED	Marisa Olislagers
20	MF	NOR	Olaug Tvedten
21	MF	USA	Madison Haley
22	FW	ESP	Carla Camacho
23	DF	NED	Marit Auée
25	GK	ENG	Hannah Poulter
27	DF	SCO	Rachel McLauchlan
29	MF	JPN	Fuka Tsunoda
32	GK	ENG	Sophie Baggaley
33	MF	AUS	Charlize Rule
64	MF	ENG	Emilie Gay

== Pre-season and friendlies ==
Win Draw Loss Fixtures

2 August 2025 Friendly	Brighton & Hove Albion	0–1	Hammarby	Lancing
12:00		Report	Wangerheim	Stadium: American Express Elite Football Performance Centre; Attendance: 0 (Behind closed doors)

8 August 2025 Friendly	Brighton & Hove Albion	2–2	Ajax	Lancing
	Kirby (pen.); Seike	Report	Tolhoek; Derks	Stadium: American Express Elite Football Performance Centre; Attendance: 0 (Behind closed doors); Referee: Lisa Benn
Note: The match was composed of two 30-minute periods and one 45-minute period.

15 August 2025 Friendly	Brighton & Hove Albion	5–0	Crystal Palace	Lancing
14:00 BST	Nolan 5' (o.g.); Seike; Noordam 45'; Olislagers 49'; Rayner 58'	Report		Stadium: American Express Elite Football Performance Centre; Attendance: 0 (Behind closed doors)

20 August 2025 Friendly	Alhama	1–2	Brighton & Hove Albion	Murcia, Spain
09:30 BST	Kuki 78'	Report	Haley 22'; Kirby 25'	Stadium: Pinatar Arena; Attendance: 0 (Behind closed doors)

23 August 2025 Friendly	Levante	0–8	Brighton & Hove Albion	Murcia, Spain
18:00 BST		Report	Rule 10'; Kirby 13'; Haley 20'; Agyemang; Seike; Symonds	Stadium: Pinatar Arena; Attendance: 0 (Behind closed doors)

31 August 2025 Friendly	Brighton & Hove Albion	2–0	West Ham	Crawley
	Agyemang; Kirby			Stadium: Broadfield Stadium; Attendance: 0 (Behind closed doors)

=== Pre-season and friendly goalscorers ===
As of 31 August 2025

Rnk	No	Pos	Nat	Name	Goals
1	14	MF	(England)	Fran Kirby	4
1	21	MF	(United States)	Madison Haley	4
2	11	FW	(Japan)	Kiko Seike	3
3	9	FW	(England)	Michelle Agyemang	2
4	8	MF	(England)	Maisie Symonds	1
4	15	MF	(Netherlands)	Nadine Noordam	1
4	17	MF	(England)	Bex Rayner	1
4	19	DF	(Netherlands)	Marisa Olislagers	1
4	33	MF	(Australia)	Charlize Rule	1
Own goals					1
Total					19

== Competitions ==
=== Overall record ===
Competition	First match	Last match	Starting round	Final position	Record							
Competition	First match	Last match	Starting round	Final position	Pld	W	D	L	GF	GA	GD	Win %
Women's Super League	7 September 2025	16 May 2026	Matchday 1	7th	22	7	5	10	27	28	−1	31.82
Women's FA Cup	18 January 2026	31 May 2026	Fourth round	Runners-up	5	4	0	1	9	7	+2	80.00
Women's League Cup	24 September 2025	12 November 2025	Group stage	Group stage	4	2	0	2	6	3	+3	50.00
Total					31	13	5	13	42	38	+4	41.94

Last updated: 31 May 2026
Source: Soccerway

=== Women's Super League ===
==== Results summary ====
Overall								Home						Away					
Pld	W	D	L	GF	GA	GD	Pts	W	D	L	GF	GA	GD	W	D	L	GF	GA	GD
22	7	5	10	27	28	−1	26	4	3	4	17	15	+2	3	2	6	10	13	−3

Last updated: 16 May 2026.
Source: Women's Super League

==== Results by matchday ====
Round	1	2	3	4	5	6	7	8	9	10	11	12	13	14	15	17	18	19	20	21	16 (Note: Game on matchweek 16 was postponed due to a waterlogged pitch. Game rescheduled for 6 May 2026.)	22
Ground	H	A	H	H	A	A	H	A	H	A	H	A	A	H	A	A	H	A	H	A	H	H
Result	D	L	W	W	L	L	L	D	W	W	L	L	W	L	L	L	D	W	W	D	D	L
Position	7	8	6	6	6	7	8	7	7	7	7	8	6	7	8	8	8	6	6	6	6	7
Points	1	1	4	7	7	7	7	8	11	14	14	14	17	17	17	17	18	21	24	25	26	26

Source: Women's Super League
A = Away; H = Home; W = Win; D = Draw; L = Loss

==== Matches ====
Brighton & Hove Albion WSL fixtures

7 September 2025 1	Brighton & Hove Albion	0–0	Aston Villa	Crawley
12:00 BST	Olislagers (yellow card) 84'; Haley (yellow card) 90+6'	Report	Grant (yellow card) 33'; Deslandes (yellow card) 45+4'; Wilms (yellow card) 47'; Baijings (yellow card) 51'; Taylor (yellow card) 72'; Daly (yellow card) 90+1'	Stadium: Broadfield Stadium; Attendance: 2,219; Referee: Ryan Atkin

12 September 2025 2	Manchester City	2–1	Brighton & Hove Albion	Manchester
19:30 BST	Shaw 58'; Hasegawa 74'	Report	Kirby 14'; Rayner (yellow card) 25'; Rule (yellow card) 85'	Stadium: Academy Stadium; Attendance: 3,136; Referee: Adewunmi Soneye

21 September 2025 3	Brighton & Hove Albion	4–1	West Ham United	Crawley
12:00 BST	Hayes 23'; Seike 35'; Symonds (yellow card) 41'; Kafaji 58'; Olislagers 86'	Report	Asseyi 51' (pen.)	Stadium: Broadfield Stadium; Attendance: 1,810; Referee: Grace Lowe

28 September 2025 4	Brighton & Hove Albion	1–0	Everton	Crawley
12:00 BST	Agyemang 26', (yellow card) 56'; Rule (yellow card) 41'; McLauchlan (yellow card) 72'; Symonds (yellow card) 78'	Report	Mace (yellow card) 22'; Wheeler (yellow card) 66'; Robinson (yellow card) 80'	Stadium: Broadfield Stadium; Attendance: 1,722; Referee: Stacey Pearson

5 October 2025 5	Tottenham Hotspur	1–0	Brighton & Hove Albion	London (Leyton)
11:55 BST	Tandberg 26'; Koga (yellow card) 52'; Spence (yellow card) 66'; Nildén (yellow card) 90+1'	Report	Hayes (yellow card) 35'	Stadium: Brisbane Road; Attendance: 1,427; Referee: Ryan Atkin

12 October 2025 6	Arsenal	1–0	Brighton & Hove Albion	London (Holloway)
14:30 BST	Olislagers 15' (o.g.); Kelly (yellow card) 90+12'	Report		Stadium: Emirates Stadium; Attendance: 27,336; Referee: Kirsty Dowle

2 November 2025 7	Brighton & Hove Albion	2–3	Manchester United	Crawley
12:00 GMT	Kirby 68'; Seike 90+2'	Report	Terland 45'; Park 58'; Naalsund 89'	Stadium: Broadfield Stadium; Attendance: 3,363; Referee: Stacey Pearson

9 November 2025 8	Liverpool	1–1	Brighton & Hove Albion	St Helens
12:00 GMT	Olsson 26'; Nagano (yellow card) 72'; Shimizu (yellow card) 73'; Kirby (yellow card) 88'; Kapocs (yellow card) 90+2'	Report	Seike (yellow card) 34'; Kafaji 90+3'	Stadium: Totally Wicked Stadium; Attendance: 2,423; Referee: Phoebe Cross

16 November 2025 9	Brighton & Hove Albion	4–1	Leicester City	Falmer
12:00 GMT	Mpomé (yellow card) 17', (goal) 47'; Haley 27'; Olislagers 87'; Seike 90+4'	Report	van Egmond (yellow card) 26'; Tierney (yellow card) 71'; O'Brien 75'	Stadium: Falmer Stadium; Attendance: 4,645; Referee: Megan Wilson

7 December 2025 10	London City Lionesses	0–1	Brighton & Hove Albion	London (Bromley)
12:00 GMT	Parris (yellow card) 29'; Franssi (yellow card) 83'; Kennedy (yellow card) 90+3'	Report	Seike 6'; Haley (penalty missed) 19'; Vanegas (yellow card) 42'; Noordam (yellow card) 70'	Stadium: Hayes Lane; Attendance: 3,302; Referee: Grace Lowe

14 December 2025 11	Brighton & Hove Albion	0–3	Chelsea	Crawley
11:55 GMT	Haley (yellow card) 65'	Report	Baltimore 42', (yellow card) 67'; Hayes 51' (o.g.); Thompson 73'; Walsh (yellow card) 90+2'	Stadium: Broadfield Stadium; Attendance: 3,493; Referee: Sophie Dennington

11 January 2026 12	Aston Villa	2–1	Brighton & Hove Albion	Birmingham (Aston)
12:00 GMT	Patten (yellow card) 33'; Daly 57'; Hanson 58'; Kendall (yellow card) 77'	Report	Tsunoda 11'; Kafaji (yellow card) 56'	Stadium: Villa Park; Attendance: 2,361; Referee: Megan Wilson

23 January 2026 13	Everton	0–1	Brighton & Hove Albion	Liverpool (Walton)
19:00 GMT	Hayashi (yellow card) 26'	Report	Čanković 41'	Stadium: Goodison Park; Attendance: 2,351; Referee: Amy Fearn

1 February 2026 14	Brighton & Hove Albion	1–2	London City Lionesses	Crawley
11:55 GMT	Seike 23'; McLauchlan (yellow card) 77'; Čanković (yellow card) 90+3'	Report	Minami 36' (o.g.); Godfrey 45+1'	Stadium: Broadfield Stadium; Attendance: 1,990; Referee: Megan Wilson

8 February 2026 15	West Ham United	3–2	Brighton & Hove Albion	London (Dagenham)
12:00 GMT	Zelem (yellow card) 6'; Martinez (yellow card) 74', (goal) 86'; Morgan 83'; Asseyi 90+1'; Wandeler (yellow card) 90+1'	Report	Haley (yellow card) 37'; Čanković (yellow card) 38'; Seike 40'; Vanegas 63'; Tvedten (yellow card) 72'; Nnadozie (yellow card) 76'; Noordam (yellow card) 78'	Stadium: Victoria Road; Attendance: 1,249; Referee: Adewunmi Soneye

18 March 2026 17	Chelsea	2–1	Brighton & Hove Albion	London (Kingston upon Thames)
19:00 GMT	Thompson 13'; Nüsken (yellow card) 32'; Kaptein (yellow card) 34'; Potter 39'; Bronze (yellow card) 72'	Report	Camacho 17'; Vanegas (yellow card) 20'; Rayner (yellow card) 56'; Mpomé (yellow card) 80'	Stadium: Kingsmeadow; Attendance: 2,581; Referee: Stacey Pearson
Note: Fixture was originally scheduled to be played on 15 March 2026 at 14:00, but was postponed due to Chelsea playing in the League Cup final.

22 March 2026 18	Brighton & Hove Albion	0–0	Liverpool	Crawley
12:00 GMT	Kafaji (yellow card) 58'; Mpomé (yellow card) 71'	Report	Csillag (yellow card) 90+2'	Stadium: Broadfield Stadium; Attendance: 2,316; Referee: Adewunmi Soneye
Note: Fixture was originally scheduled kick off at 14:00, but was moved for live Sky Sports broadcasting.

29 March 2026 19	Leicester City	0–1	Brighton & Hove Albion	Leicester
15:00 BST	Tierney (yellow card) 77'	Report	Symonds (yellow card) 29'; Seike 48'; Olislagers (yellow card) 59'	Stadium: King Power Stadium; Attendance: 2,453; Referee: William Davis

25 April 2026 20	Brighton & Hove Albion	3–2	Manchester City	Crawley
12:00 BST	Rule (yellow card) 14'; Haley 45+2', 65'; Seike 47'; Kirby (yellow card) 61'	Report	Kerolin 5', (yellow card) 29'; Shaw 86'	Stadium: Broadfield Stadium; Attendance: 2,262; Referee: Megan Wilson
Note: Fixture was originally scheduled to be played on 26 April 2026 at 14:00.

2 May 2026 21	Manchester United	1–1	Brighton & Hove Albion	Leigh
12:00 BST	Tullis-Joyce (yellow card) 90+1'; Schüller 90+4'	Report	Rule (yellow card) 32'; Čanković 39', (yellow card) 41'; Haley (yellow card) 80'	Stadium: Leigh Sports Village; Attendance: 4,067; Referee: Grace Lowe
Note: Fixture was originally scheduled to be played on 3 May 2026 at 13:00.

6 May 2026 16	Brighton & Hove Albion	1–1	Arsenal	Crawley
19:45 BST	Minami (yellow card) 35'; Tsunoda 43'; Seike (yellow card) 90+3'	Report	Pelova (yellow card) 41'; Maanum 62'; Kelly (yellow card) 85'	Stadium: Broadfield Stadium; Attendance: 4,450; Referee: Callum Jones
Note: Fixture was originally scheduled to be played on 15 February 2026 with a 14:00 kick-off. The kick-off time was then changed to 14:30, but was postponed due to a waterlogged pitch.

16 May 2026 22	Brighton & Hove Albion	1–2	Tottenham Hotspur	Falmer
13:00 BST	Haley 49'; Hayes (yellow card) 68'	Report	Nildén (yellow card) 54'; Morris (yellow card) 66'; Holdt 81'; Spence (yellow card) 86'; Koga 90+2'	Stadium: Falmer Stadium; Attendance: 6,749; Referee: Stacey Pearson
Note: Fixture was originally scheduled to be played at the Broadfield Stadium with a 14:00 kick-off.

==== League table ====
Pos	Team	Pld	W	D	L	GF	GA	GD	Pts
5	Tottenham Hotspur	22	11	3	8	35	38	−3	36
6	London City Lionesses	22	8	3	11	28	35	−7	27
7	Brighton & Hove Albion	22	7	5	10	27	28	−1	26
8	Everton	22	7	2	13	25	37	−12	23
9	Aston Villa	22	5	5	12	28	48	−20	20

Source: WSL League Table
Rules for classification: 1) Points; 2) Goal difference; 3) Number of goals scored.

=== FA Cup ===
As a member of the Women's Super League Brighton & Hove Albion enter the FA Cup in the fourth round.

18 January 2026 Fourth round	Brighton & Hove Albion	2–0	Nottingham Forest	Crawley
13:00 GMT	Kafaji (yellow card) 15'; Haley 45+3' (pen.); Čanković 90+2'	Report		Stadium: Broadfield Stadium; Attendance: 916; Referee: Stacey Pearson

22 February 2026 Fifth round	West Ham United	1–2	Brighton & Hove Albion	Dagenham
12:00 GMT	Siren (yellow card) 23'; Asseyi (yellow card) 23'; Zelem (yellow card) 70'; Wandeler 75'	Report	Kirby 6'; Seike 20'; Haley (yellow card) 53'; McLauchlan (yellow card) 74'; Baggaley (yellow card) 90+3'	Stadium: Victoria Road; Attendance: 710; Referee: Sophie Dennington

5 April 2026 Quarter-finals	Arsenal	0–2	Brighton & Hove Albion	Borehamwood
13:00 BST		Report	Čanković (yellow card) 21'; Haley 48'; Hayes 63'; Vanegas (yellow card) 79'	Stadium: Meadow Park; Attendance: 3,660; Referee: Abigail Byrne

10 May 2026 Semi-finals	Liverpool	2–3	Brighton & Hove Albion	St Helens
12:15 BST	O'Sullivan 11', (yellow card) 56'; Olsson 22'; Holland (yellow card) 48'; Csillag (yellow card) 82'	Report	Vanegas 23'; Haley 54'; Noordam 90+5'	Stadium: BrewDog Stadium; Attendance: 3,949; Referee: Kirsty Dowle

31 May 2026 Final	Brighton & Hove Albion	0–4	Manchester City	Wembley
15:00 BST		Report	Shaw 38'; Greenwood 45+6'; Knaak (yellow card) 54'; Fujino 66'; Miedema 87'	Stadium: Wembley Stadium; Attendance: 43,917; Referee: Melissa Burgin

=== League Cup ===
==== Group stage ====
24 September 2025 Group C	Portsmouth	0–2	Brighton & Hove Albion	Havant
19:00 BST	Collins (yellow card) 81'; Hornby (yellow card) 90+5'	Report	Camacho 4'; Olislagers 28'	Stadium: Westleigh Park; Attendance: 623; Referee: Lisa Benn

8 October 2025 Group C	West Ham United	2–1	Brighton & Hove Albion	Dagenham
19:00 BST	Wandeler (yellow card) 17'; Piubel 29'; Paví (yellow card) 34'; Csiki (yellow card) 44'; Martinez 75'	Report	Camacho 15'; Rayner (yellow card) 20'	Stadium: Victoria Road; Attendance: 478; Referee: Megan Wilson

19 October 2025 Group C	Brighton & Hove Albion	3–0	Southampton	Crawley
14:00 BST	Seike 68', 90+4'; Kirby 71'	Report		Stadium: Broadfield Stadium; Attendance: 980; Referee: Abigail Byrne

12 November 2025 Group C	Brighton & Hove Albion	0–1	Charlton Athletic	Crawley
19:00 GMT	Kafaji (yellow card) 41'	Report	McAteer 18'; Bradley (yellow card) 72'	Stadium: Broadfield Stadium; Attendance: 566; Referee: Ryan Atkin

Pos	Team	Pld	W	PW	PL	L	GF	GA	GD	Pts	Qualification
1	West Ham United	4	3	0	0	1	12	4	+8	9	Advanced to knockout stage
2	Charlton Athletic	4	3	0	0	1	7	6	+1	9	
3	Brighton & Hove Albion	4	2	0	0	2	6	3	+3	6	
4	Portsmouth	4	1	0	0	3	2	6	−4	3	
5	Southampton	4	1	0	0	3	2	10	−8	3	

Source: Women's League Cup
Rules for classification: 1) Points; 2) Goal difference; 3) Number of goals scored; 4) Number of wins; 5) Head-to-head record

== Squad statistics ==
Italics indicate a loaned in player.

=== Appearances ===
As of 31 May 2026

Starting appearances are listed first, followed by substitute appearances after the + symbol where applicable.

No.	Pos	Nat	Player	Total		WSL		FA Cup		League Cup	
No.	Pos	Nat	Player	Apps	Goals	Apps	Goals	Apps	Goals	Apps	Goals
1	GK	(Nigeria) NGA	Chiamaka Nnadozie	23	0	19	0	4	0	0	0
2	DF	(Colombia) COL	Manuela Vanegas	19	2	11+3	1	5	1	0	0
3	DF	(Japan) JPN	Moeka Minami	24	0	18	0	5	0	0+1	0
5	DF	(France) FRA	Maelys Mpomé	18	1	3+9	1	0+3	0	2+1	0
6	FW	(Sweden) SWE	Rosa Kafaji	26	2	13+6	2	1+2	0	3+1	0
8	MF	(England) ENG	Maisie Symonds	28	0	21+1	0	5	0	0+1	0
9	FW	(England) ENG	Michelle Agyemang	8	1	5	1	0	0	2+1	0
10	MF	(Serbia) SRB	Jelena Čanković	24	3	18	2	4+1	1	0+1	0
11	FW	(Japan) JPN	Kiko Seike	28	11	18+2	8	5	1	0+3	2
14	MF	(England) ENG	Fran Kirby	23	3	14+3	2	4	1	1+1	0
15	MF	(Netherlands) NED	Nadine Noordam	31	1	9+13	0	1+4	1	3+1	0
16	DF	(Colombia) COL	Jorelyn Carabalí	4	0	0	0	0	0	4	0
17	MF	(England) ENG	Bex Rayner	10	0	3+3	0	1+1	0	2	0
18	DF	(Republic of Ireland) IRL	Caitlin Hayes	24	2	15+2	1	3+1	1	1+2	0
19	DF	(Netherlands) NED	Marisa Olislagers	30	3	21+1	2	5	0	2+1	1
20	MF	(Norway) NOR	Olaug Tvedten	7	0	1+6	0	0	0	0	0
21	MF	(United States) USA	Madison Haley	22	7	15+2	4	5	3	0	0
22	FW	(Spain) ESP	Carla Camacho	24	3	5+13	1	0+2	0	3+1	2
23	DF	(Netherlands) NED	Marit Auée	10	0	0+7	0	0	0	3	0
27	DF	(Scotland) SCO	Rachel McLauchlan	27	0	12+8	0	0+4	0	3	0
29	MF	(Japan) JPN	Fuka Tsunoda	13	2	2+5	2	1+1	0	4	0
32	GK	(England) ENG	Sophie Baggaley	8	0	3	0	1	0	4	0
33	MF	(Australia) AUS	Charlize Rule	25	0	17+2	0	5	0	0+1	0
41	MF	(England) ENG	Taylor Warren	1	0	0	0	0	0	0+1	0
46	MF	(England) ENG	Elliana Martin	4	0	0+1	0	0	0	2+1	0
47	MF	(England) ENG	Evie Milner	1	0	0	0	0	0	0+1	0
48	FW	(England) ENG	Tahirah Heron	5	0	0+2	0	0	0	3	0
64	MF	(England) ENG	Emilie Gay	3	0	0	0	0	0	2+1	0

=== Goalscorers ===
As of match played 31 May 2026

Rnk	No	Pos	Nat	Name	WSL	FA Cup	League Cup	Total
1	11	FW	(Japan)	Kiko Seike	8	1	2	11
2	21	MF	(United States)	Madison Haley	4	3	0	7
3	14	MF	(England)	Fran Kirby	2	1	1	4
4	10	MF	(Serbia)	Jelena Čanković	2	1	0	3
4	19	DF	(Netherlands)	Marisa Olislagers	2	0	1	3
4	22	FW	(Spain)	Carla Camacho	1	0	2	3
7	2	DF	(Colombia)	Manuela Vanegas	1	1	0	2
7	6	FW	(Sweden)	Rosa Kafaji	2	0	0	2
7	18	DF	(Republic of Ireland)	Caitlin Hayes	1	1	0	2
7	29	MF	(Japan)	Fuka Tsunoda	2	0	0	2
10	5	DF	(France)	Maelys Mpomé	1	0	0	1
10	9	FW	(England)	Michelle Agyemang	1	0	0	1
10	15	MF	(Netherlands)	Nadine Noordam	0	1	0	1
Total					27	9	6	42

=== Assists ===
As of match played 31 May 2026

Rank	No.	Pos.	Nat.	Player	WSL	FA Cup	League Cup	Total
1	14	MF	(England)	Fran Kirby	3	3	0	6
2	15	MF	(Netherlands)	Nadine Noordam	5	0	0	5
3	6	FW	(Sweden)	Rosa Kafaji	3	0	0	3
3	11	FW	(Japan)	Kiko Seike	2	1	0	3
3	21	MF	(United States)	Madison Haley	3	0	0	3
6	27	DF	(Scotland)	Rachel McLauchlan	1	0	1	2
7	3	DF	(Japan)	Moeka Minami	1	0	0	1
7	9	FW	(England)	Michelle Agyemang	1	0	0	1
7	16	DF	(Colombia)	Jorelyn Carabalí	0	0	1	1
7	17	MF	(England)	Bex Rayner	0	0	1	1
7	19	DF	(Netherlands)	Marisa Olislagers	1	0	0	1
Totals					20	4	3	27

=== Clean sheets ===
As of match played 31 May 2026

Rank	No.	Pos.	Nat.	Player	Matches played	Clean sheet %	WSL	FA Cup	League Cup	Total
1	1	GK	(Nigeria)	Chiamaka Nnadozie	23	30.43%	6	2	0	8
2	32	GK	(England)	Sophie Baggaley	8	25.00%	0	0	2	2
Totals					31	29.03%	6	2	2	10

=== Disciplinary record ===
As of match played 31 May 2026

No.	Pos.	Nat.	Player	WSL			FA Cup			League Cup			Total		
No.	Pos.	Nat.	Player	Booked	(yellow card) (yellow-red card)	Sent off (straight red)	Booked	(yellow card) (yellow-red card)	Sent off (straight red)	Booked	(yellow card) (yellow-red card)	Sent off (straight red)	Booked	(yellow card) (yellow-red card)	Sent off (straight red)
1	GK	(Nigeria)	Chiamaka Nnadozie	1	0	0	0	0	0	0	0	0	1	0	0
2	DF	(Colombia)	Manuela Vanegas	2	0	0	1	0	0	0	0	0	3	0	0
3	DF	(Japan)	Moeka Minami	1	0	0	0	0	0	0	0	0	1	0	0
5	DF	(France)	Maelys Mpomé	3	0	0	0	0	0	0	0	0	3	0	0
6	FW	(Sweden)	Rosa Kafaji	2	0	0	1	0	0	1	0	0	4	0	0
8	MF	(England)	Maisie Symonds	3	0	0	0	0	0	0	0	0	3	0	0
9	FW	(England)	Michelle Agyemang	1	0	0	0	0	0	0	0	0	1	0	0
10	MF	(Serbia)	Jelena Čanković	3	0	0	1	0	0	0	0	0	4	0	0
11	FW	(Japan)	Kiko Seike	2	0	0	0	0	0	0	0	0	2	0	0
14	MF	(England)	Fran Kirby	1	0	0	0	0	0	0	0	0	1	0	0
15	MF	(Netherlands)	Nadine Noordam	2	0	0	0	0	0	0	0	0	2	0	0
17	MF	(England)	Bex Rayner	2	0	0	0	0	0	1	0	0	3	0	0
18	DF	(Republic of Ireland)	Caitlin Hayes	2	0	0	0	0	0	0	0	0	2	0	0
19	DF	(Netherlands)	Marisa Olislagers	2	0	0	0	0	0	0	0	0	2	0	0
20	MF	(Norway)	Olaug Tvedten	1	0	0	0	0	0	0	0	0	1	0	0
21	MF	(United States)	Madison Haley	4	0	0	1	0	0	0	0	0	5	0	0
27	DF	(Scotland)	Rachel McLauchlan	2	0	0	1	0	0	0	0	0	3	0	0
32	GK	(England)	Sophie Baggaley	0	0	0	1	0	0	0	0	0	1	0	0
33	MF	(Australia)	Charlize Rule	4	0	0	0	0	0	0	0	0	4	0	0
Total				38	0	0	6	0	0	2	0	0	46	0	0

== Transfers ==
=== In ===
Date	Position	Nationality	Name	From	Ref.
21 June 2025	DF	(Japan)	Moeka Minami	(Italy) Roma	
1 July 2025 (Note: The transfer was announced on 27 June, but became official on 1 July when her current contract expired)	GK	(Nigeria)	Chiamaka Nnadozie	(France) Paris FC	
3 July 2025	DF	(Colombia)	Manuela Vanegas	(Spain) Real Sociedad	
4 August 2025	FW	(Spain)	Carla Camacho	(Spain) Real Madrid	
4 August 2025	MF	(England)	Taylor Warren	(England) Chelsea	
11 August 2025	DF	(France)	Maelys Mpomé	(England) Chelsea	
4 September 2025	MF	(Japan)	Fuka Tsunoda	(Japan) Urawa Reds	
8 January 2026	MF	(Norway)	Olaug Tvedten	(Norway) Vålerenga	
2 February 2026	FW	(United States)	Olivia Garcia	(Denmark) HB Køge	

=== Loans in ===
Date	Position	Nationality	Name	From	Until	Ref.
11 August 2025	FW	(Sweden)	Rosa Kafaji	(England) Arsenal	End of season	
19 August 2025	FW	(England)	Michelle Agyemang	(England) Arsenal	January 2026 (Note: Agyemang returned to Arsenal early due to an injury.)	

=== Out ===
Date	Position	Nationality	Name	To	Ref.
June 2025	DF	(Norway)	Guro Bergsvand	(Germany) VfL Wolfsburg	
June 2025	FW	(Germany)	Pauline Bremer	(Germany) 1. FC Köln	
June 2025	DF	(England)	Poppy Pattinson	(England) London City Lionesses	
June 2025	MF	(Serbia)	Dejana Stefanović	(Serbia) Crvena Zvezda	
June 2025	DF	(Norway)	Maria Thorisdottir	(France) Marseille	
4 June 2025	MF	(England)	Olivia Carpenter	(England) Lewes	
4 June 2025	GK	(Nigeria)	Comfort Erhabor	(England) Portsmouth	
4 June 2025	FW	(England)	Chelsea Ferguson	(England) Lewes	
4 June 2025	MF	(England)	Clarabella Hall	(England) Cheltenham Town	
4 June 2025	DF	(England)	Beth Kaluya	(England) Lewes	
4 June 2025	GK	(Switzerland)	Lily Murray	(United States) Southern Illinois University	
18 June 2025	DF	(China)	Li Mengwen	(Scotland) Rangers	
9 July 2025	MF	(Spain)	Vicky Losada	(England) Bristol City	
22 July 2025	FW	(England)	Nikita Parris	(England) London City Lionesses	
7 January 2026	DF	(Colombia)	Jorelyn Carabalí	(United States) Boston Legacy FC	
6 May 2026	DF	(Wales)	Elinor Guest	(United States) Coastal Carolina University	
15 May 2026	DF	(England)	Evie Milner	Free agent	
16 May 2026	MF	(England)	May Balmer	Free agent	

=== Loans out ===
Date	Position	Nationality	Name	To	Until	Ref.
1 August 2025	GK	(Germany)	Melina Loeck	(Sweden) Hammarby	1 January 2026	
1 September 2025	MF	(England)	Olivia Johnson	(England) Bristol City	January 2026 (Note: On 3 January, Johnson was recalled back from her season-long loan at Bristol City and subsequently joined Nottingham Forest on loan)	
4 September 2025	MF	(England)	Libby Bance	(England) Birmingham City	End of season	
5 September 2025	DF	(England)	Jess Pegram	(Scotland) Rangers	End of season	
30 January 2026	MF	(England)	Evie Milner	(England) Portsmouth	End of season	
2 February 2026	FW	(United States)	Olivia Garcia	(Sweden) AIK	End of season	
3 February 2026	MF	(England)	Olivia Johnson	(England) Nottingham Forest	End of season	
