= Charlie Rule =

Australian footballer

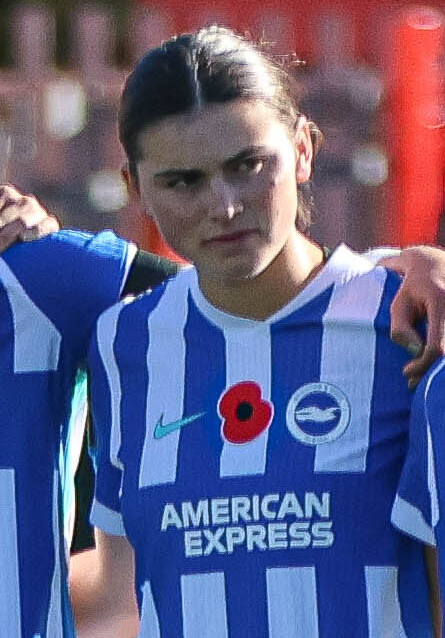
- Rule with Brighton & Hove Albion in 2025

Personal information
- Full name: Charlize Jayde Rule
- Date of birth: 16 February 2003 (age 23)
- Place of birth: Randwick, New South Wales, Australia
- Height: 1.76 m (5 ft 9 in)
- Positions: Right-back; centre-back

Team information
- Current team: Brighton & Hove Albion
- Number: 33

Youth career
- Queens Park
- FNSW Institute

Senior career*
Years	Team	Apps	(Gls)
2020–2023	Sydney	42	(3)
2022	Sydney Olympic FC Women	6	(8)
2023–	Brighton & Hove Albion	33	(1)

International career^{‡}
2019	Australia U17	5	(0)
2022	Australia U20	3	(0)
2023–	Australia	8	(0)
- * Club domestic league appearances and goals as of 13 September 2026 ‡ National team caps and goals as of 15 April 2026

Charlize Jayde Rule (/ˈtʃarˈliz/; born 16 February 2003) is an Australian professional soccer player who plays as a right-back for Women's Super League club Brighton & Hove Albion and the Australia national team.

== Early life ==
Rule grew up in the eastern suburbs of Sydney, around Bondi. She began playing football at the age of five, joining a boys' team at Queens Park FC. She has cited her older brother as a major influence, saying she was inspired by watching him play and that competing against him in the backyard gave her determination and commitment. Rule went to Reddam House for her High School education. Rule progressed through the FNSW Institute talent pathway and also represented Sydney University FC before joining Sydney FC. She studied a Bachelor of Sport and Exercise Science at the University of Technology Sydney.

== Club career ==
=== Sydney FC ===
On 13 August 2020, Rule signed for Sydney FC for the 2020–21 W-League season, becoming the youngest member of the squad at the time. On 8 January 2021, Rule made her W-League debut against the Newcastle Jets in a 2–1 victory for the Sky Blues. Rule was substituted into the match in the 88th minute. She earned Sydney FC Player of the Match honours in the 2020–21 Grand Final.

Rule made 42 league appearances and scored three goals across three seasons with Sydney FC, helping the club win three consecutive A-League Women Premierships (2020–21, 2021–22, 2022–23) and the 2022–23 Championship.

=== Sydney Olympic FC ===
In 2022, Rule also played for Sydney Olympic FC Women in the National Premier Leagues NSW Women's competition, making six appearances and scoring eight goals.

=== Brighton & Hove Albion ===
On 26 July 2023, Rule signed for Brighton & Hove Albion in the English Women's Super League on a five-year deal. She was one of three players to join Brighton from Sydney FC that summer, alongside Madison Haley and Mackenzie Hawkesby. Head coach Melissa Phillips described her as "an exciting young player with a lot of ambition in the game." She scored her first goal for the club on 11 October 2023, against Birmingham City in the FA Women's League Cup. However, Rule's debut season was disrupted by a lengthy injury that kept her sidelined from December 2023 until March 2025.

On 10 August 2024, despite still recovering from injury, Rule signed a new contract with Brighton, demonstrating the club's long-term commitment to her development. On 30 March 2025, Rule made her first appearance for Brighton since December 2023, coming on as a substitute and scoring her first goal in the Women's Super League.

==== 2025–26 season ====
Ahead of the 2025–26 season, Rule scored during preseason in an 8–0 victory against Levante in Spain as Brighton prepared under new head coach Dario Vidosic. Rule established herself as a regular starter during the season, playing primarily as a centre-back. By February 2026, she had made 15 league appearances, accumulating over 1,100 minutes of playing time. Her consistent performances earned her a recall to the Matildas squad for the 2026 AFC Asian Cup.

== International career ==
=== Youth ===
Rule was a major part of the Junior Matildas team during the 2019 AFC U-16 Championship qualification and final tournament. She featured during five matches of qualification and she featured in all five games in the final tournament, playing 381 minutes, starting four out of five games and coming off the bench against Bangladesh.

On 21 November 2020, Rule was called up for the first ever Women's Talent Identification Camp which was held in Canberra from 22 to 26 November 2020.

In April 2022, Rule was selected for the Young Matildas squad for a two-match international series against New Zealand in Canberra, the team's first competitive fixtures in over two years. She earned three caps at under-20 level.

=== Senior ===
Rule made her senior international debut playing in the 5–0 defeat to Canada on 1 December 2023. She was not capped again for over two years as she recovered from her lengthy injury at club level.

==== 2026 AFC Women's Asian Cup ====
On 19 February 2026, Rule was named in the 26-player Matildas squad for the 2026 AFC Asian Cup, held on home soil across Perth, the Gold Coast and Sydney. She was one of eight players making their Women's Asian Cup debut.

Rule earned her first competitive cap for the Matildas on 5 March 2026, starting at centre-back in Australia's 4–0 Group A victory over IR Iran at Gold Coast Stadium. She completed the full 90 minutes and helped the side keep a clean sheet, receiving a yellow card in the 52nd minute. The match marked only her second senior cap, coming more than two years after her debut. Speaking after the match, Rule described the experience as "unbelievable" and said she felt honoured to be part of the squad.

Rule was an unused substitute in the final group stage match against Korea Republic on 8 March 2026 at Stadium Australia, a match that ended 3–3 in front of a tournament-record crowd of 60,279. Winonah Heatley replaced Rule at centre-back as head coach Joe Montemurro made five changes to the starting line-up. Australia finished as Group A runners-up on goal difference and advanced to face Korea DPR in the quarter-finals on 13 March 2026 at Perth Rectangular Stadium, with a place in the semi-finals and direct qualification for the 2027 FIFA Women's World Cup at stake.

== Off the field ==
In October 2022, Rule was named a New Balance brand ambassador. New Balance General Manager for Pacific, Dean Howard, described her as "an exciting talent" and highlighted the partnership as part of the brand's support for the growth of women's football ahead of the 2023 FIFA World Cup.

Rule has spoken about her love of surfing and the beach, describing it as both a personal passion and a form of recovery from football.

== Career statistics ==
=== Club ===
As of match played 13 September 2026.

Appearances and goals by club, season and competition
Club	Season	League			National cup		League cup		Total	
Club	Season	Division	Apps	Goals	Apps	Goals	Apps	Goals	Apps	Goals
Sydney FC	2020–21	W-League	9	0	—		—		9	0
Sydney FC	2021–22	A-League Women	12	3	—		—		12	3
Sydney FC	2022–23	A-League Women	21	0	—		—		21	0
Sydney FC	Total		42	3	—		—		42	3
Sydney Olympic FC	2022	National Premier Leagues NSW Women's	6	8	—		—		6	8
Brighton & Hove Albion	2023–24	WSL	9	0	0	0	2	1	11	1
Brighton & Hove Albion	2024–25	WSL	4	1	0	0	0	0	4	1
Brighton & Hove Albion	2025–26	WSL	19	0	5	0	1	0	25	0
Brighton & Hove Albion	2026–27	WSL	1	0	0	0	0	0	1	0
Brighton & Hove Albion	Total		33	1	5	0	3	1	41	2
Career total			81	12	5	0	3	1	89	13

=== International ===
As of match played 15 April 2026

Appearances and goals by national team and year
National team	Year	Apps	Goals
Australia	2023	1	0
Australia	2026	5	0
Total		6	0

== Honours ==
Australia

- AFC Women's Asian Cup runners-up: 2026

Sydney FC

- A-League Women Premiership: 2020–21, 2021–22, 2022–23
- A-League Women Championship: 2022–23
