= Nadine Noordam =

Dutch footballer (born 1998)

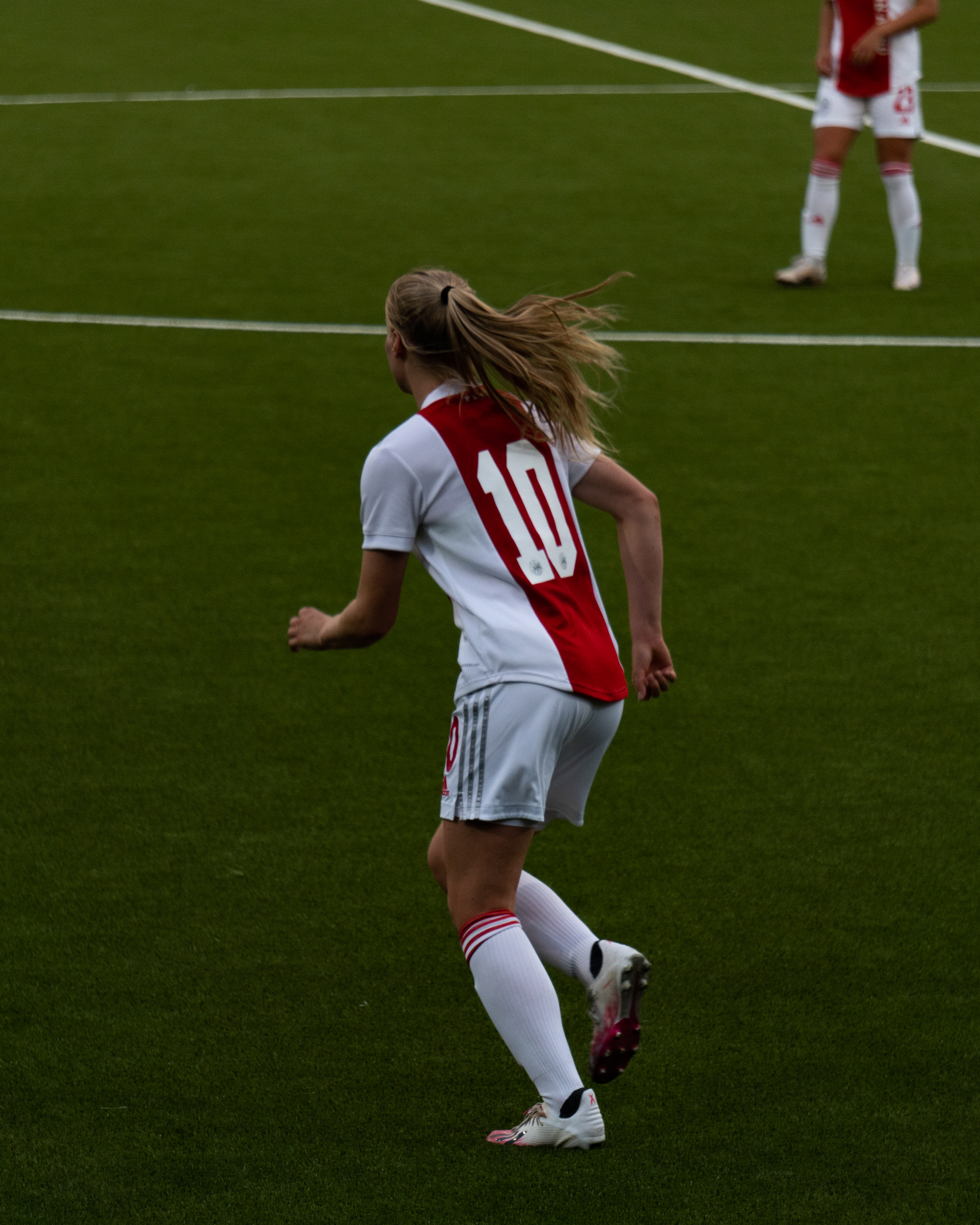
- Noordam in August 2021

Personal information
- Date of birth: 29 July 1998 (age 28)
- Place of birth: Delft, Netherlands
- Height: 5 ft 5 in (1.66 m)
- Position: Midfielder

Team information
- Current team: Ajax

Youth career
- SV Honselersdijk

Senior career*
Years	Team	Apps	(Gls)
2015–2021	ADO Den Haag	126	(21)
2021–2025	Ajax	71	(12)
2025–2026	Brighton & Hove Albion	39	(1)
2026–	Ajax	8	(1)

International career^{‡}
2013	Netherlands U15	5	(0)
2014	Netherlands U16	7	(0)
2014–2015	Netherlands U17	6	(0)
2015–2017	Netherlands U19	22	(6)
2019–2021	Netherlands U23	10	(2)
- * Club domestic league appearances and goals as of 18 October 2026 ‡ National team caps and goals as of 10 April 2021

Nadine Noordam (Dutch: [naːˈdinə ˈnoːrdɑm]; born 29 July 1998) is a Dutch professional footballer who plays as a midfielder for Eredivisie club Ajax.

Noordam spent 10 years in the Netherlands playing for ADO Den Haag and Ajax, playing over 200 matches for both clubs combined. She joined Brighton & Hove Albion in 2025.

== Club career ==
Noordam grew up in Honselersdijk and started playing football with the local club. She then joined ADO Den Haag in 2015. On 20 June 2019, she signed a new contract with the club. On 15 July 2020, she signed another contract with the club.

On 11 June 2021, Noordam signed for Ajax on a one-year contract. She signed on the same day as her teammate Tiny Hoekstra, who became roommates together and even hit the milestone of playing 100 matches for Ajax at the same time. On 29 June 2022, Noordam, along with her teammate Jonna van de Velde, signed new three-year contract extensions with the club until mid 2025.

In January 2024, Noordam became an ambassador for the Ajax Foundation, along with Devyne Rensch. When she left Ajax to join Brighton, she also left her role as club ambassador, being succeeded by Danique Tolhoek.

In November 2024, Noordam played her 100th league match for Ajax against FC Utrecht.

On 31 January 2025, Brighton & Hove Albion announced the signing of Noordam from Ajax. She became the sixth Dutch player to sign for the club.

On 10 May 2026, Noordam was brought on as a substitute for Fran Kirby and scored the winning goal in a 3–2 victory over Liverpool to qualify Brighton for the 2026 Women's FA Cup final.

On 1 July 2026, Noordam signed a three-year contract with Ajax.

== International career ==
On 20 October 2016, Noordam scored a hattrick for Netherlands U19 against Bulgaria U19.

== Style of play ==
Noordam describes herself as a "box-to-box midfielder" who enjoys "dribbling, passing and moving forward".

== Career statistics ==
=== Club ===
As of match played 18 October 2026

Club	Season	League			National Cup (Note: Includes KNVB Women's Cup and Women's FA Cup)		League Cup (Note: Includes Eredivisie Cup and FA Women's League Cup)		Continental (Note: Includes UEFA Women's Champions League and UEFA Women's Europa Cup)		Other (Note: Includes KNVB Women's Super Cup)		Total	
Club	Season	Division	Apps	Goals	Apps	Goals	Apps	Goals	Apps	Goals	Apps	Goals	Apps	Goals
ADO Den Haag	2014–15	Women's BeNe League	1	0	0	0	0	0	—		—		1	0
ADO Den Haag	2015–16	Eredivisie	21	2	0	0	0	0	—		—		21	2
ADO Den Haag	2016–17	Eredivisie	26	6	0	0	0	0	—		—		26	6
ADO Den Haag	2017–18	Eredivisie	25	7	0	0	0	0	—		—		25	7
ADO Den Haag	2018–19	Eredivisie	21	3	0	0	0	0	—		—		21	3
ADO Den Haag	2019–20	Eredivisie	12	0	0	0	0	0	—		—		12	0
ADO Den Haag	2020–21	Eredivisie	20	3	3	0	3	0	—		—		26	3
ADO Den Haag	Total		126	21	3	0	3	0	—		—		132	21
Ajax	2021–22	Eredivisie	24	5	4	2	3	1	0	0	0	0	31	8
Ajax	2022–23	Eredivisie	18	1	1	0	3	0	3	0	1	0	26	1
Ajax	2023–24	Eredivisie	17	3	4	3	1	0	11	0	1	0	34	6
Ajax	2024–25	Eredivisie	12	3	0	0	0	0	2	0	1	0	15	3
Ajax	Total		71	12	9	5	7	1	16	0	3	0	106	18
Brighton & Hove Albion	2024–25	Women's Super League	7	0	1	0	0	0	—		—		8	0
Brighton & Hove Albion	2025–26	Women's Super League	22	0	5	1	4	0	—		—		31	1
Brighton & Hove Albion	Total		29	0	6	1	4	0	0	0	0	0	39	1
Ajax	2026–27	Eredivisie	8	1	0	0	—		6	1	0	0	14	2
Career total			234	34	18	6	14	1	22	1	3	0	2910	42

== Honours ==
ADO Den Haag

- KNVB Women's Cup winner: 2015–16

Ajax

- Eredivisie winner: 2022-23
- KNVB Women's Cup winner: 2021–22, 2023–24
