= Fūka Tsunoda =

Japanese footballer (born 2004)

Fuka Tsunoda 角田 楓佳
Personal information
- Date of birth: 24 October 2004 (age 22)
- Place of birth: Saitama Prefecture, Japan
- Height: 1.56 m (5 ft 1 in)
- Position: Defensive midfielder

Team information
- Current team: Crystal Palace (loan)
- Number: 25

Senior career*
Years	Team	Apps	(Gls)
2021–2025	Urawa Reds	41	(3)
2025–	Brighton & Hove Albion	7	(2)
2026–	→ Crystal Palace (loan)	9	(0)

International career^{‡}
2024	Japan U20	4	(0)
Medal record
Women's football
Representing Japan
FIFA U-20 Women's World Cup
Runner-up	Colombia 2024
- * Club domestic league appearances and goals as of 21 November 2026 ‡ National team caps and goals as of 22 September 2024

Fuka Tsunoda (角田 楓佳, Tsunoda Fūka; born 24 October 2004) is a Japanese professional footballer who plays as a defensive midfielder for Women's Super League club Crystal Palace, on loan from Women's Super League club Brighton & Hove Albion.

== Club career ==
On 31 October 2021. Tsunoda made her WE League debut with Urawa Reds.

=== Brighton & Hove Albion ===
On 4 September 2025, it was announced that Brighton & Hove Albion had signed Tsunoda on undisclosed terms. joining fellow country mates Kiko Seike and Moeka Minami.

==== Loan to Crystal Palace ====
On 11 August 2026, it was announced that Tsunoda had been loaned to Crystal Palace until the end of the season.

== International career ==
She was called up to the Japan squad at the 2024 FIFA U-20 Women's World Cup. She played four matches and captained the group E match against Ghana.

== Career statistics ==
=== Club ===
As of match played 21 November 2026

Appearances and goals by club, season and competition
Club	Season	League			National cup (Note: Includes Empress's Cup, Women's FA Cup)		League cup (Note: Includes WE League Cup, Women's League Cup)		Continental		Total	
Club	Season	Division	Apps	Goals	Apps	Goals	Apps	Goals	Apps	Goals	Apps	Goals
Urawa Red Diamonds	2021–22	WE League	2	0	0	0	0	0	—		2	0
Urawa Red Diamonds	2022–23	WE League	5	0	0	0	2	0	—		7	0
Urawa Red Diamonds	2023–24	WE League	15	1	4	0	2	0	4 (Note: Appearance(s) in AFC Women's Club Championship)	0	25	1
Urawa Red Diamonds	2024–25	WE League	19	2	4	0	1	0	4 (Note: Appearance(s) in AFC Women's Champions League)	2	28	4
Urawa Red Diamonds	2025–26	WE League	4	0	0	0	0	0	—		4	0
Urawa Red Diamonds	Total		41	3	8	0	5	0	8	2	62	5
Brighton & Hove Albion	2025–26	Women's Super League	7	2	2	0	4	0	—		13	2
Crystal Palace (loan)	2026–27	Women's Super League	9	0	0	0	2	0	—		11	0
Career Total			57	5	10	0	11	0	8	2	86	7

== Honours ==
Urawa Red Diamonds

- WE League: 2022–23, 2023–24
- Empress's Cup: 2024
- WE League Cup: 2022–23
- AFC Women's Club Championship: 2023
