= Maisie Symonds =

English Footballer

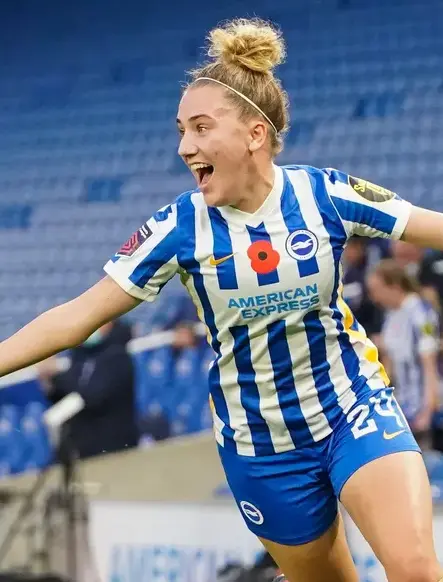
- Symonds with Brighton & Hove Albion in 2023

Personal information
- Date of birth: 2 February 2003 (age 23)
- Place of birth: Gravesend, England
- Height: 5 ft 8 in (1.73 m)
- Position: Midfielder

Team information
- Current team: Brighton & Hove Albion
- Number: 8

Youth career
- 2011-2015: Ebbsfleet United boys
- 2012-2021: Chelsea

Senior career*
Years	Team	Apps	(Gls)
2021–	Brighton & Hove Albion	93	(3)

International career^{‡}
2019	England U17	3	(1)
2021–2022	England U19	9	(0)
2023–	England U23	3	(0)
2025	England	0	(0)
- * Club domestic league appearances and goals as of 22 November 2026 ‡ National team caps and goals as of 28 November 2025

Maisie Symonds (/ˈmeɪzi/ MAY-zee; born 2 February 2003) is an English footballer who plays as a midfielder for Women's Super League club Brighton & Hove Albion and the England U23 team. She has represented England from under-16 youth level and captained the under-19 team.

== Club career ==
In May 2021, Symonds made her WSL debut for Brighton & Hove Albion against Bristol City, followed by her first professional start in the 6–0 win against Huddersfield Town in the 2020–21 FA Cup. On 17 June 2021, Symonds signed her first professional contract with Brighton & Hove Albion.

During her second season, the 2021–22 season, Symonds scored her debut goal for the club against Leicester City, which won the goal of the season as voted for by fans. In September 2022, Symonds was recovering from glandular fever after a pre-season trip to Bavaria.

She has been described as a rising star in the Seagulls side by the Women's FA.

On 7 August 2023, she signed a contract extension with Brighton.

She was appointed first-team captain in summer 2025

In July 2026, Symonds signed a new contract with Brighton, described by the club as a "long-term" deal.

== International career ==
Symonds has represented England from under-16 to under-23 youth levels.

On 24 October 2019, with the under-17 team for 2020 UEFA U-17 Championship qualification, she scored her youth international debut goal in the 4–0 win over Bosnia and Herzegovina.

In June 2021, Symonds was called up to the under-19 training camp at St George's Park, making her debut for the team as part of the starting eleven in a 4–1 win over the Czech Republic.

In October 2021, she captained the England U19 squad to two victories in 2022 U-19 Championship qualification against the Republic of Ireland and Switzerland. In February 2022, Symonds again captained the U19 team to consecutive wins, against Finland and Denmark in the Marbella International Tournament. In June 2022, she was named in the under-19 squad for the 2022 U-19 Championship, featuring in group stage matches. In November 2023, Symonds was named in the under-23 squad, making her debut for the team against Spain on 4 December 2023.

In March 2025, Symonds was selected for the England senior squad for the first time, for the 2025 UEFA Women's Nations League matches against Belgium in April.

It is understood that Symonds is eligible to play for Scotland and the Republic of Ireland.

== Career statistics ==
=== Club ===
As of match played 22 November 2026.

Appearances and goals by club, season and competition
Club	Season	League			FA Cup		League Cup		Total	
Club	Season	Division	Apps	Goals	Apps	Goals	Apps	Goals	Apps	Goals
Brighton & Hove Albion	2020–21	WSL	2	0	1	0	0	0	3	0
Brighton & Hove Albion	2021–22	WSL	16	1	1	0	3	0	20	1
Brighton & Hove Albion	2022–23	WSL	4	0	0	0	1	0	5	0
Brighton & Hove Albion	2023–24	WSL	20	0	2	0	4	0	26	0
Brighton & Hove Albion	2024–25	WSL	18	0	1	0	3	1	22	1
Brighton & Hove Albion	2025–26	WSL	22	0	5	0	1	0	28	0
Brighton & Hove Albion	2026–27	WSL	11	2	0	0	5	0	16	2
Career total			93	3	10	0	17	1	120	4

== Honours ==
Individual

- Brighton & Hove Albion Goal of the Season: 2021-22
- Brighton & Hove Albion Young Player of the Season: 2023-24
- Barclays Goal of the Month: October 2026
