= Maelys Mpomé =

French footballer (born 2003)

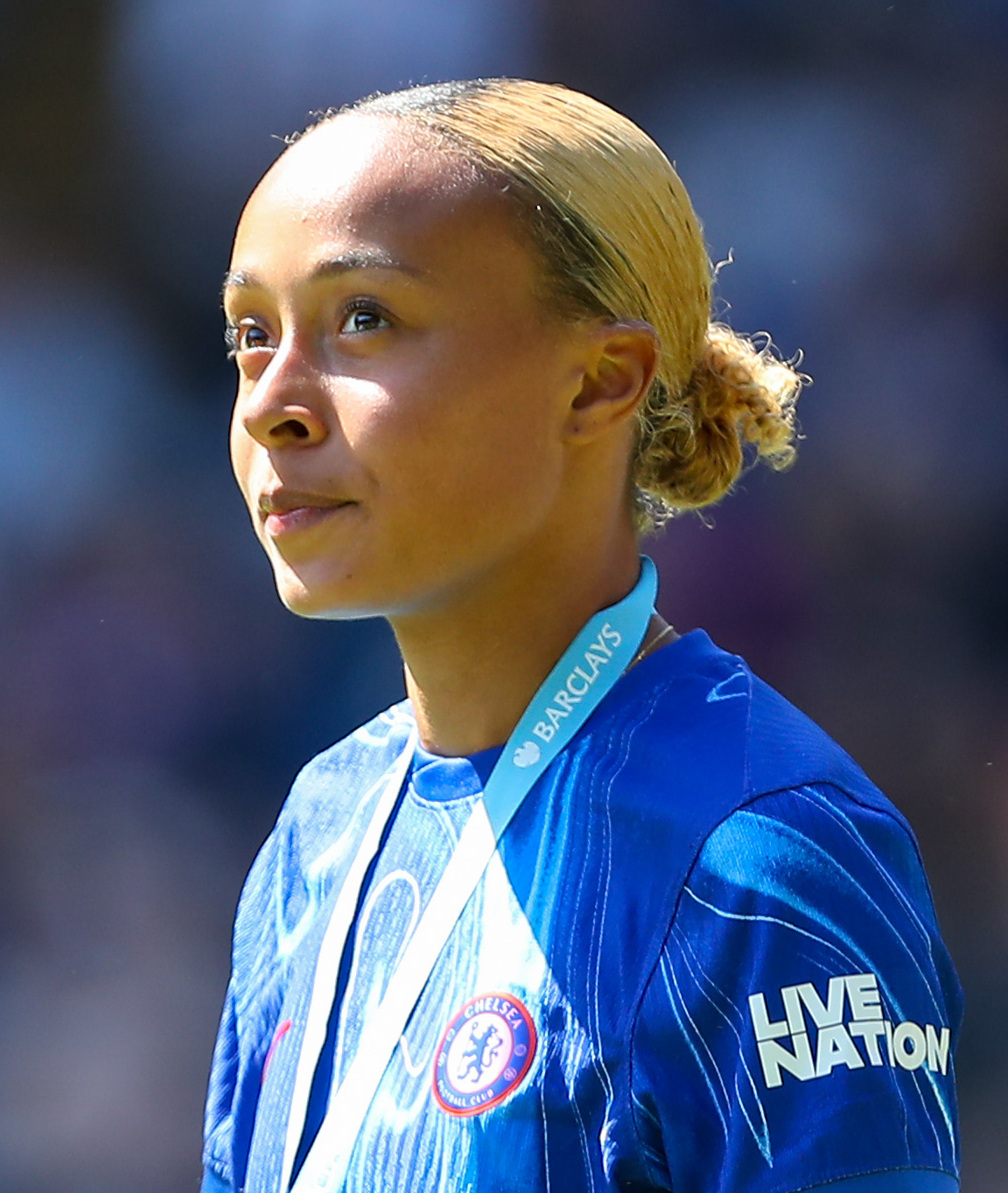
- Mpomé with Chelsea in 2025

Personal information
- Full name: Maelys Emma Mpomé
- Date of birth: 23 February 2003 (age 23)
- Place of birth: Champigny-sur-Marne, France
- Height: 1.80 m (5 ft 11 in)
- Position: Defender

Team information
- Current team: Brighton & Hove Albion
- Number: 5

Youth career
- 2010–2018: VGA Saint-Maur

Senior career*
Years	Team	Apps	(Gls)
2018–2020	VGA Saint-Maur	9	(0)
2020–2024	Montpellier	57	(4)
2024–2025	Chelsea	5	(0)
2025–	Brighton & Hove Albion	16	(1)

International career^{‡}
2019	France U16	8	(0)
2019	France U17	4	(1)
2021–2022	France U19	5	(0)
2021	France U20	3	(0)
2022–	France U23	10	(0)
- * Club domestic league appearances and goals as of 22 November 2026 ‡ National team caps and goals as of 28 November 2024

Maelys Emma Mpomé (French pronunciation: [ma.elis ɛmpɔme]; born 23 February 2003) is a French professional footballer who plays as a defender for Women's Super League club Brighton & Hove Albion.

== Club career ==
=== VGA Saint-Maur ===
Maelys Mpomé began her football career at the age of seven at VGA Saint-Maur, a sports club with a long tradition in women's football, based not far from her hometown of Champigny-sur-Marne. She would spend ten years there and made her debut in the first team on 16 September 2018, at the age of 15, on the third matchday of the Division 2 Féminine. That season, Mpomé made three appearances for the A-squad and six more followed in 2019/20.

=== Montpellier ===
In the summer of 2020, she took the step to move to first division club Montpellier HSC, where she made her debut on 17 October of that year in a match against Reims.

During her first season in French professional football, the young central defender made five appearances in the championship and one in the cup. The following year, Mpomé was finally able to play her way into the regular team alongside Maëlle Lakrar, played in 17 league and two cup matches and scored her first goal on the eighth matchday of the championship against Issy. Her club finished the season in fifth place.

In the 2022/23 season, she faced competition for the centre-back position from the newly signed Luna Gevitz, but still made 20 league appearances and scored two goals, although she was only in the starting lineup half of the time and was often substituted on. In the cup competition, she reached the round of 16 with Montpellier, while the championship again ended in fifth place.

=== Chelsea ===
Mpomé signed for Women's Super League side Chelsea from Montpellier in September 2024 on a four-year deal through to 2028, at the start of the 2024-25 Women's Super League campaign which saw Chelsea become League champions for a sixth time, as well as winning both the FA Cup and the League Cup. However, after making just 8 appearances for Chelsea across the WSL, League Cup and Champions League, Chelsea announced that Mpomé would be departing the London club.

=== Brighton and Hove Albion ===
On 11 August 2025, Brighton & Hove Albion announced the permanent signing of Mpomé from Chelsea.

== International career ==
Mpomé made her debut for the French U17 national team on 23 March 2019, during the qualification for the European Championship 2019; her team failed in the elite round and thus could not take part in the final round. In April of this year, Mpomé won the Montaigu Tournament with France U16. In September 2019, she played in all three matches of the qualification for the European U17 Championship and scored her first goal against Belarus. However, the elite and final rounds were later cancelled due to the COVID-19 pandemic. In September 2021, she made her debut for France U19 and qualified for the final round of the 2022 U19 Championship, but did not take part in it. In November 2021, she had already taken part in the Costa Daurada Trophy with the U20. On October 5, 2022, Maelys Mpomé played for the first time for the U23 national team.

== Career statistics ==
=== Club ===
As of match played 22 November 2026.

Appearances and goals by club, season and competition
Club	Season	League			National Cup (Note: Includes Coupe de France Féminine)		League Cup		Continental		Total	
Club	Season	Division	Apps	Goals	Apps	Goals	Apps	Goals	Apps	Goals	Apps	Goals
VGA Saint-Maur	2018–19	Seconde Ligue	3	0	—		—		—		3	0
VGA Saint-Maur	2019–20	Seconde Ligue	6	0	—		—		—		6	0
VGA Saint-Maur	Total		9	0	—		—		—		9	0
Montpellier	2020–21	Division 1 Féminine	5	0	1	0	—		—		6	0
Montpellier	2021–22	Division 1 Féminine	17	1	1	0	—		—		18	1
Montpellier	2022–23	Division 1 Féminine	20	2	1	0	—		—		21	2
Montpellier	2023–24	Division 1 Féminine	15	1	0	0	—		—		15	1
Montpellier	Total		57	4	3	0	—		—		60	4
Chelsea	2024–25	Women's Super League	5	0	0	0	1	0	4 (Note: Appearances in the UEFA Women's Champions League)	0	10	0
Brighton & Hove Albion	2025–26	Women's Super League	9	1	3	0	3	0	—		15	1
Brighton & Hove Albion	2026–27	Women's Super League	7	0	0	0	4	1	—		11	1
Brighton & Hove Albion	Total		16	1	3	0	7	1	—		26	2
Career total			87	5	6	0	8	1	4	0	105	6

== Honours ==
France U16

- Montaigu Tournament: 2019

Chelsea

- Women's Super League: 2024–25
- Women's FA Cup: 2024–25
- FA Women's League Cup: 2024–25
