= Rosa Kafaji =

Swedish footballer (born 2003)

- Kafaji in 2026

Personal information
- Full name: Rusul Rosa Kafaji
- Date of birth: 5 July 2003 (age 23)
- Place of birth: Solna, Sweden
- Height: 1.69 m (5 ft 7 in)
- Position: Attacking midfielder

Team information
- Current team: London City Lionesses
- Number: 76

Youth career
- 2011–2014: Kallhälls FF
- 2014–2015: Bele Barkarby
- 2015–2019: AIK

Senior career*
Years	Team	Apps	(Gls)
2019–2021	AIK	45	(19)
2022–2024	BK Häcken	39	(17)
2024–2026	Arsenal	10	(1)
2025–2026	→ Brighton & Hove Albion (loan)	19	(2)
2026–	London City Lionesses	2	(0)

International career^{‡}
2018–2020	Sweden U17	20	(5)
2021	Sweden U19	5	(4)
2021–2023	Sweden U23	4	(0)
2023–	Sweden	20	(3)
- * Club domestic league appearances and goals as of 14 October 2026 ‡ National team caps and goals as of 14 October 2026

Rusul Rosa Kafaji (Note: Arabic: رسل روزا الخفاجي, pronounced [ˈrusul ˈruːza‿l.xaˈfaːdʒi].) (born 5 July 2003) is a Swedish professional footballer who plays as a forward for Women's Super League club London City Lionesses and the Sweden national team.

== Club career ==
=== AIK (2019–2021) ===
Kafaji grew up in Akalla and started playing football in Kallhälls FF when she was eight years old. After that, Kafaji played for Bele Barkarby FF before she went to AIK before the 2015 season. Kafaji made her debut for the A-team in the Elitettan in 2019 and scored four goals and three assists in seven matches during the season. In the 2020 season, she scored 12 goals in 18 matches and helped AIK to be promoted to the Damallsvenskan.

=== BK Hacken (2022–2024) ===
In January 2022 she signed for Damallsvenskan club BK Hacken where she scored 28 goals in 61 appearances. She also made her debut in the UWCL scoring four goals in the 2023-24 season where Hacken made it to the quarter finals for the first time in club history. Because of her performance she was named as one of UEFAs ten players to watch in 2024. She ended her last season as club top scorer with 15 goals.

=== Arsenal (2024–2026) ===
On 13 August 2024, Kafaji joined Women's Super League club Arsenal on a long-term contract. On 20 October 2024, she scored her debut goal for Arsenal in a 2–0 away win over West Ham.

On 11 August 2025, it was announced that Kafaji would spend the 2025-26 season on loan at Brighton.

=== London City Lionesses ===
On 16th July 2026, Kafaji put pen to paper on a three-year deal with London City Lionesses, arriving from Arsenal for an undisclosed fee. On 4 September 2026, she was in the starting line in the opening match of the season against Manchester United which ended in a 2-1 win for London City at home.

== International career ==
In February 2021, Kafaji was selected for the Swedish women's national team for the first time. She earned her first cap on 31 October 2021, subbing in on the 86th minute during a 1–1 draw to Italy as part of the 2023-24 UWNL campaign.

In 2024 she was called up to join the National Team in the two UWNL playoff games against Bosnia-Herzegovina on February 23 and 28. She started both games and scored her first goal for the Swedish senior women's team in the latter one.

== Personal life ==
Kafaji was born to parents who are originally from Iraq. Her father moved back there after her parents divorced.

== Career statistics ==
=== Club ===
As of match played 4 September 2026

Club	Season	League			National cup		League cup		Continental		Total	
Club	Season	Division	Apps	Goals	Apps	Goals	Apps	Goals	Apps	Goals	Apps	Goals
AIK	2019	Elitettan	7	4	1	0	—		—		8	4
AIK	2020	Elitettan	18	12	2	1	—		—		20	13
AIK	2021	Damallsvenskan	20	3	1	0	—		—		21	3
AIK	Total		45	19	4	1	—		—		49	20
BK Häcken	2022	Damallsvenskan	1	0	6	4	—		—		7	4
BK Häcken	2023	Damallsvenskan	26	12	5	3	—		—		31	15
BK Häcken	2024	Damallsvenskan	12	5	2	0	—		10	4	24	9
BK Häcken	Total		39	17	13	7	—		10	4	62	28
Arsenal	2024–25	WSL	10	1	1	0	1	0	7	0	19	1
Brighton & Hove Albion (loan)	2025–26	WSL	19	2	3	0	4	0	—		26	2
London City Lionesses	2026–27	WSL	1	0	0	0	0	0	—		1	0
Career total			127	46	4	0	5	0	17	4	153	50

=== International ===
As of match played 13 October 2026

Appearances and goals by national team and year
National team	Year	Apps	Goals
Sweden	2023	2	0
Sweden	2024	10	2
Sweden	2025	2	1
Sweden	2026	6	0
Total		20	3

Scores and results list Sweden's goal tally first, score column indicates score after each Kafaji goal.

List of international goals scored by Rosa Kafaji
No.	Date	Venue	Opponent	Score	Result	Competition
1	28 February 2024	Tele2 Arena, Stockholm, Sweden	Bosnia and Herzegovina	3–0	5–0	2023–24 UEFA Women's Nations League
2	28 November 2024	Dubočica Stadium, Leskovac, Serbia	Serbia	2–0	2–0	UEFA Women's Euro 2025 qualifying play-offs
3	2 December 2025	Nationalarenan, Solna, Sweden	France	2–1	2–2 (a.e.t.)	2025 UEFA Women's Nations League Finals

== Honours ==
=== Club ===
AIK

- Elitettan winner: 2020

Arsenal

- UEFA Women's Champions League: 2024–25
