= Olaug Tvedten =

Norwegian footballer (born 2000)

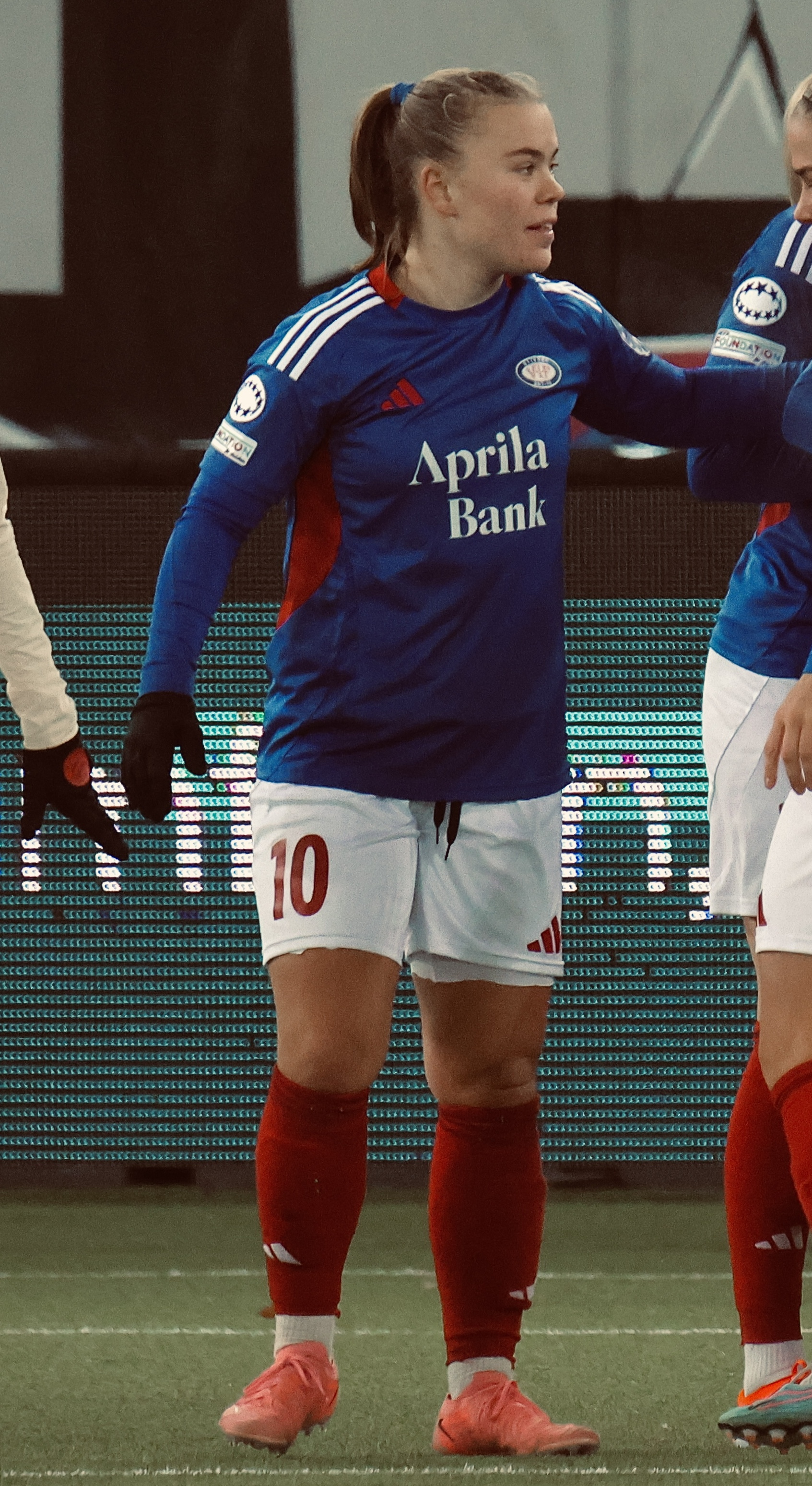
- Tvedten in 2024

Personal information
- Date of birth: 20 July 2000 (age 26)
- Height: 1.65 m (5 ft 5 in)
- Position: Midfielder

Team information
- Current team: Brighton & Hove Albion
- Number: 20

Youth career
- Trott

Senior career*
Years	Team	Apps	(Gls)
2016–2021	Avaldsnes	78	(11)
2021–2026	Vålerenga	106	(52)
2026–	Brighton & Hove Albion	18	(0)

International career^{‡}
2015	Norway U15	4	(2)
2015–2016	Norway U16	18	(4)
2017	Norway U17	9	(3)
2017–2019	Norway U19	19	(2)
2019–2025	Norway U23	13	(1)
2024–	Norway	1	(0)
- * Club domestic league appearances and goals as of 22 November 2026 ‡ National team caps and goals as of 7 April 2025

Olaug Tvedten (born 20 July 2000) is a Norwegian professional footballer who plays as a midfielder for Women's Super League club Brighton & Hove Albion and the Norway national team.

== Club career ==
She joined Toppserien side Avaldsnes in 2016, and made her league debut in September 2016. With Avaldsnes, she was a part of the team that won the clubs first major title, winning the Norwegian cup championship in 2017.

In August 2021, she signed for Vålerenga. In June 2023, Tvedten extended her contract with Vålerenga until August 2025. She won the Toppserien with Vålerenga in 2023, and became joint top scorer in the league with 13 goals.

On 8 January 2026, Tvedten was announced at Brighton & Hove Albion on a permanent transfer.

== International career ==
Tvedten has international matches for U15, U16, U17, U19, and the U23 national team for Norway.

She was selected for the senior Norwegian national team for the first time in October 2020.

== Career statistics ==
=== Club ===
As of match played 22 November 2026.

Appearances and goals by club, season and competition
Club	Season	League			National cup (Note: Includes Norwegian Women's Cup)		League cup (Note: Includes FA Women's League Cup)		Continental (Note: Includes UEFA Women's Champions League)		Total	
Club	Season	Division	Apps	Goals	Apps	Goals	Apps	Goals	Apps	Goals	Apps	Goals
Avaldsnes	2016	Toppserien	4	0	0	0	—		1	0	5	0
Avaldsnes	2017	Toppserien	11	0	0	0	—		4	0	15	0
Avaldsnes	2018	Toppserien	12	0	0	0	—		5	0	17	0
Avaldsnes	2019	Toppserien	22	7	1	2	—		—		23	9
Avaldsnes	2020	Toppserien	17	2	1	1	—		—		18	3
Avaldsnes	2021	Toppserien	12	2	1	1	—		—		13	3
Avaldsnes	Total		78	11	3	4	0	0	10	0	91	15
Vålerenga	2021	Toppserien	3	0	2	0	—		2	0	7	0
Vålerenga	2022	Toppserien	23	7	2	2	—		0	0	25	9
Vålerenga	2023	Toppserien	27	13	4	1	—		4	1	35	15
Vålerenga	2024	Toppserien	27	13	4	2	—		9	1	40	16
Vålerenga	2025	Toppserien	26	19	5	4	—		10	1	41	24
Vålerenga	Total		106	52	17	9	0	0	25	3	148	64
Brighton & Hove Albion	2025–26	Women's Super League	7	0	0	0	0	0	—		7	0
Brighton & Hove Albion	2026–27	Women's Super League	11	0	0	0	4	3	—		15	3
Brighton & Hove Albion	Total		18	0	0	0	4	3	—		22	3
Career total			202	63	20	13	4	3	35	3	261	82

== Honours ==
Avaldsnes

- Norwegian Women's Cup winner: 2017

Vålerenga

- Toppserien winner: 2023, 2024
- Norwegian Women's Cup winner: 2021, 2024

Individual

- UEFA Women's Under-17 Championship team of the tournament: 2017
- UEFA Women's Under-19 Championship team of the tournament: 2019
