= Bex Rayner =

English footballer

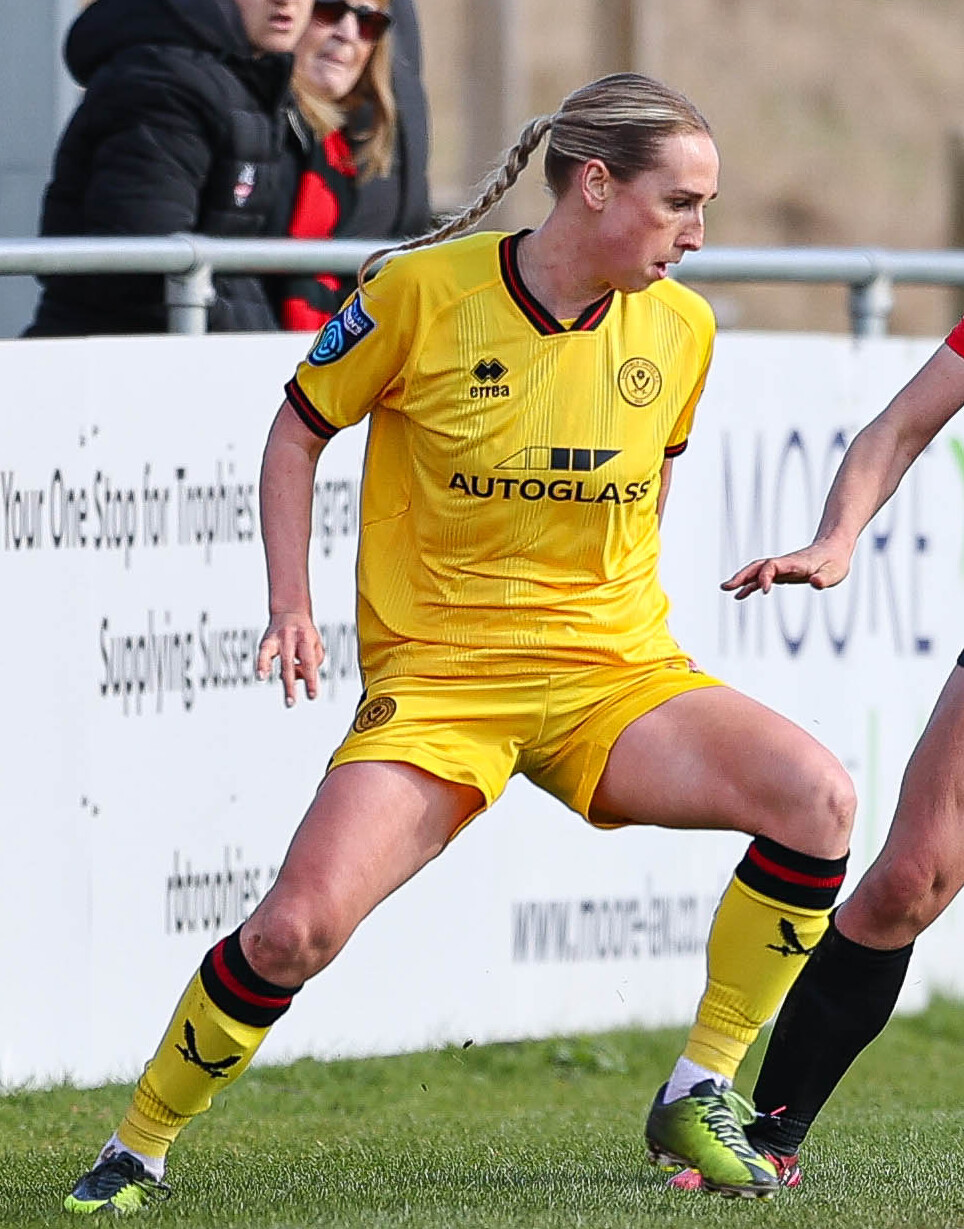
- Rayner with Sheffield United in 2024

Personal information
- Full name: Rebecca Rayner
- Date of birth: 7 November 1999 (age 27)
- Place of birth: Cleckheaton, England
- Position: Midfielder

Team information
- Current team: Brighton & Hove Albion
- Number: 17

Youth career
- 2008–2016: Leeds United

Senior career*
Years	Team	Apps	(Gls)
2016–2018	Doncaster Belles	24	(8)
2018–2019	Sheffield United	17	(4)
2019–2020	Nottingham Forest		
2020–2024	Sheffield United	64	(7)
2024–	Brighton & Hove Albion	15	(0)

International career^{‡}
2018	England U19	6	(1)
2019	England U21	4	(0)
- * Club domestic league appearances and goals as of 8 November 2026 ‡ National team caps and goals as of 12 July 2024

Rebecca Rayner (born 7 November 1999) is an English professional footballer who plays as a midfielder for Women's Super League club Brighton & Hove Albion.

== Club career ==
=== Early years ===
Rayner started playing football at Bradford Park Avenue at the age of 4, joining her brother. After attending a Leeds Legends sport camp she then played for Leeds United from the age of 8 until she was 16 years old.

=== Doncaster Belles ===
At the age of 16 Rayner joined Doncaster Belles in 2016. She won the FA WSL 2 league with Doncaster Belles in the 2018 season.

=== Sheffield United ===
On 30 June 2018, Rayner signed for Sheffield United.

=== Nottingham Forest ===
In August 2019 she signed for Nottingham Forest.

=== Return to Sheffield United ===
In January 2021, Rayner rejoined Sheffield United.

=== Brighton & Hove Albion ===
Rayner signed for Brighton & Hove Albion on 12 July 2024.

On 30 January 2026 Rayner signed a new contract with Brighton & Hove Albion.

== Career statistics ==
=== Club ===
As of match played 18 November 2026.

Appearances and goals by club, season and competition
Club	Season	League			FA Cup		League Cup		Total	
Club	Season	Division	Apps	Goals	Apps	Goals	Apps	Goals	Apps	Goals
Doncaster Belles	2016	WSL 1	7	0	0	0	0	0	7	0
Doncaster Belles	2017–18	WSL 2	17	8	0	0	4	2	21	10
Doncaster Belles	Total		24	8	0	0	4	2	28	10
Sheffield United	2018–19	Women's Championship	17	4	0	0	4	0	21	4
Nottingham Forest	2019–20	FA Women's National League								
Sheffield United	2020–21	Women's Championship	9	1	0	0	0	0	9	1
Sheffield United	2021–22	Women's Championship	13	1	1	1	4	0	18	2
Sheffield United	2022–23	Women's Championship	22	3	1	0	4	1	27	4
Sheffield United	2023–24	Women's Championship	20	2	1	0	1	0	22	2
Sheffield United	Total		64	7	3	1	9	1	76	9
Sheffield United combined total			81	11	3	1	13	1	97	13
Brighton & Hove Albion	2024–25	Women's Super League	4	0	1	0	1	0	6	0
Brighton & Hove Albion	2025–26	Women's Super League	6	0	2	0	2	0	10	0
Brighton & Hove Albion	2026–27	Women's Super League	5	0	0	0	5	0	10	0
Brighton & Hove Albion	Total		15	0	3	0	8	0	26	0
Career total			120	19	6	1	25	3	150	22

== Honours ==
Doncaster Belles

- FA WSL 2 winner: 2017–18
