= Carla Camacho =

Spanish footballer (born 2005)

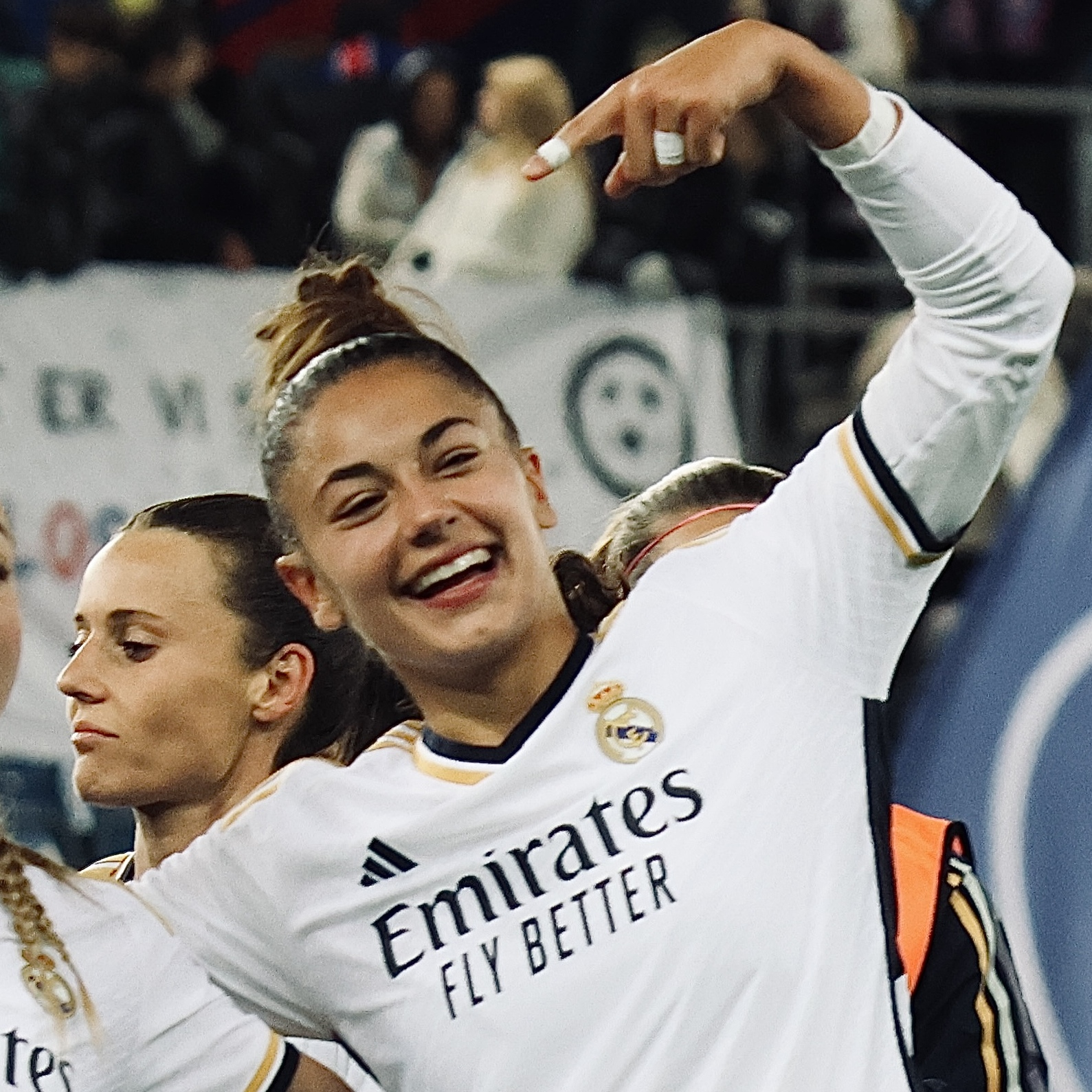
- Camacho with Real Madrid in 2023

Personal information
- Full name: Carla Camacho Carrillo
- Date of birth: 2 May 2005 (age 21)
- Place of birth: Madrid, Spain
- Height: 1.72 m (5 ft 8 in)
- Position: Forward

Team information
- Current team: Lazio (on loan from Brighton & Hove Albion)
- Number: 9

Youth career
- 2010–2012: Orcasitas
- 2012–2020: Atlético de Madrid
- 2020–2021: Real Madrid

Senior career*
Years	Team	Apps	(Gls)
2021–2023	Real Madrid B	18+	(9+)
2021–2025	Real Madrid	15	(1)
2025–	Brighton & Hove Albion	18	(1)
2026–	→ Lazio (loan)	5	(1)

International career^{‡}
2021–2022	Spain U17	18	(8)
2023–	Spain U19	13	(9)
Medal record
Women's football
Representing Spain
FIFA U-17 Women's World Cup
Winner	2022 India
UEFA Women's Under-19 Championship
Winner	2023 Belgium
UEFA Women's Under-17 Championship
Runner-up	2022 Bosnia and Herzegovina
- * Club domestic league appearances and goals as of 14 November 2026 ‡ National team caps and goals as of 27 October 2024

Carla Camacho Carrillo (Spanish pronunciation: [ˈkaɾ.la ka.ˈma.tʃo ka.ˈri.ʝo]; born 2 May 2005) is a Spanish footballer who plays for Serie A Femminile club Lazio, on loan from Women's Super League club Brighton & Hove Albion and the Spain under-19 national team. Carla previously played for Liga F club Real Madrid.

== Club career ==
=== Real Madrid B & Real Madrid ===
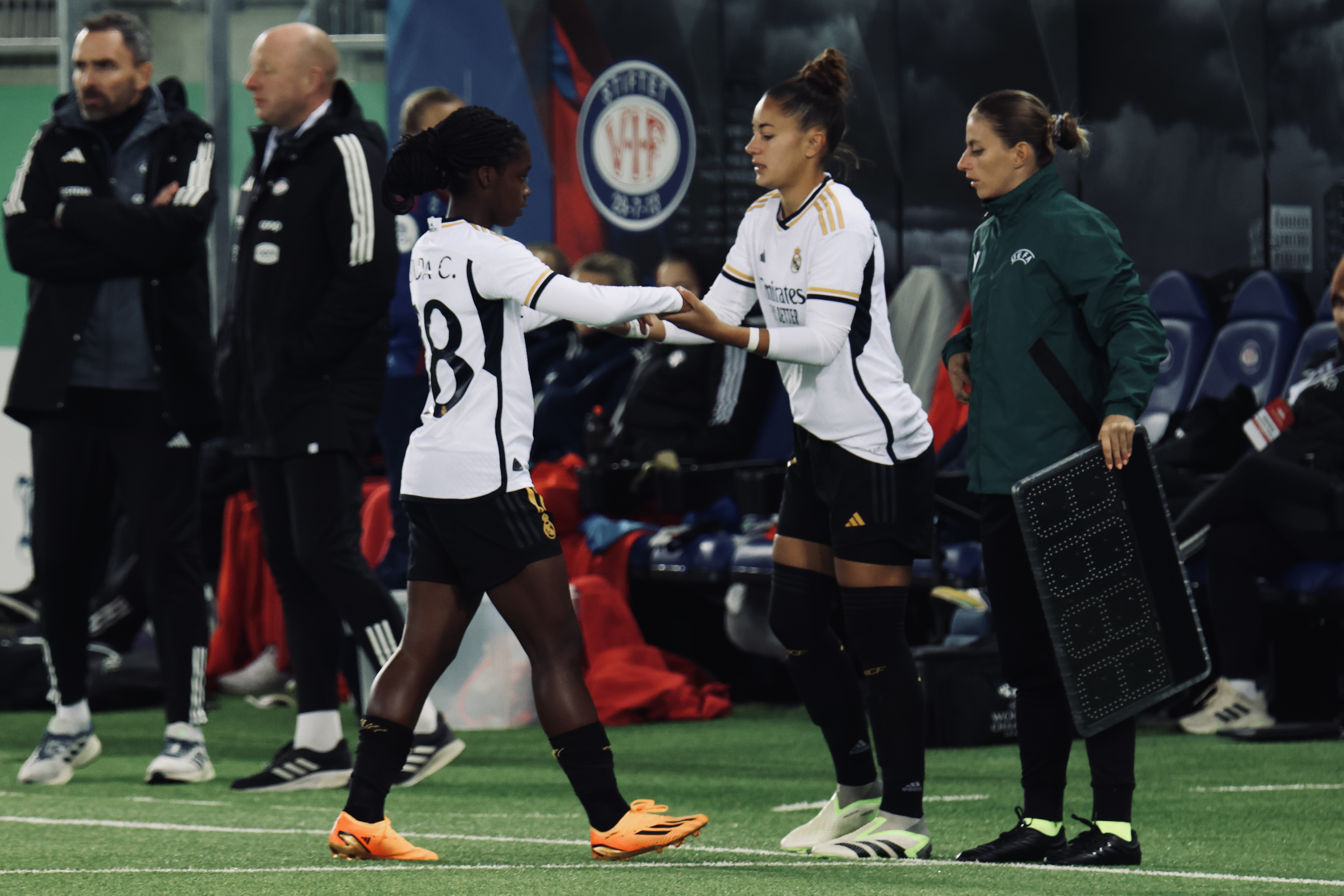
Camacho with Real Madrid in 2023

Camacho started her senior career with Real Madrid. Camacho made her first team debut against Eibar, coming on as a substitute for Caroline Møller in the 87th minute of the match. On 15 March 2025, she scored her first goal for Real Madrid in a 2–2 draw with Deportivo de A Coruña.

=== Brighton & Hove Albion ===
On 4 August 2025, it was announced that Camacho had signed for Women's Super League club Brighton & Hove Albion. Later that year, on 24 September, she scored her first goal for the club in a 2–0 away win over Portsmouth in the League Cup. On 18 March 2026, she netted her first Women's Super League goal in a 2–1 away defeat against Chelsea.

==== Loan to Lazio ====
On 11 August 2026, it was announced that Camacho had been loaned to Lazio until the end of the season.

== Career statistics ==
=== Club ===
As of match played 14 November 2026

Appearances and goals by club, season and competition
Club	Season	League			National cup (Note: Includes the Copa de la Reina de Fútbol and Italian Women's Cup)		League cup		Continental (Note: Includes the UEFA Women's Champions League)		Total	
Club	Season	Division	Apps	Goals	Apps	Goals	Apps	Goals	Apps	Goals	Apps	Goals
Real Madrid	2021–22	Primera División	4	0	0	0	—		0	0	4	0
Real Madrid	2022–23	Liga F	1	0	1	0	—		2	1	4	1
Real Madrid	2023–24	Liga F	3	0	0	0	—		1	0	4	0
Real Madrid	2024–25	Liga F	7	1	1	0	—		1	1	9	2
Real Madrid	Total		15	1	2	0	—		4	2	21	3
Brighton & Hove Albion	2025–26	WSL	18	1	2	0	4	2	—		24	3
Lazio	2026–27	Serie A Women	5	1	3	2	0	0	—		8	3
Career total			38	3	7	2	4	2	4	2	53	9

== Honours ==
Spain U17

- FIFA U-17 Women's World Cup: 2022
- UEFA Women's Under-17 Championship runner-up: 2022

Spain U19

- UEFA Women's Under-19 Championship: 2023
