= Alex Greenwood =

English footballer (born 1993)

Alex Greenwood MBE
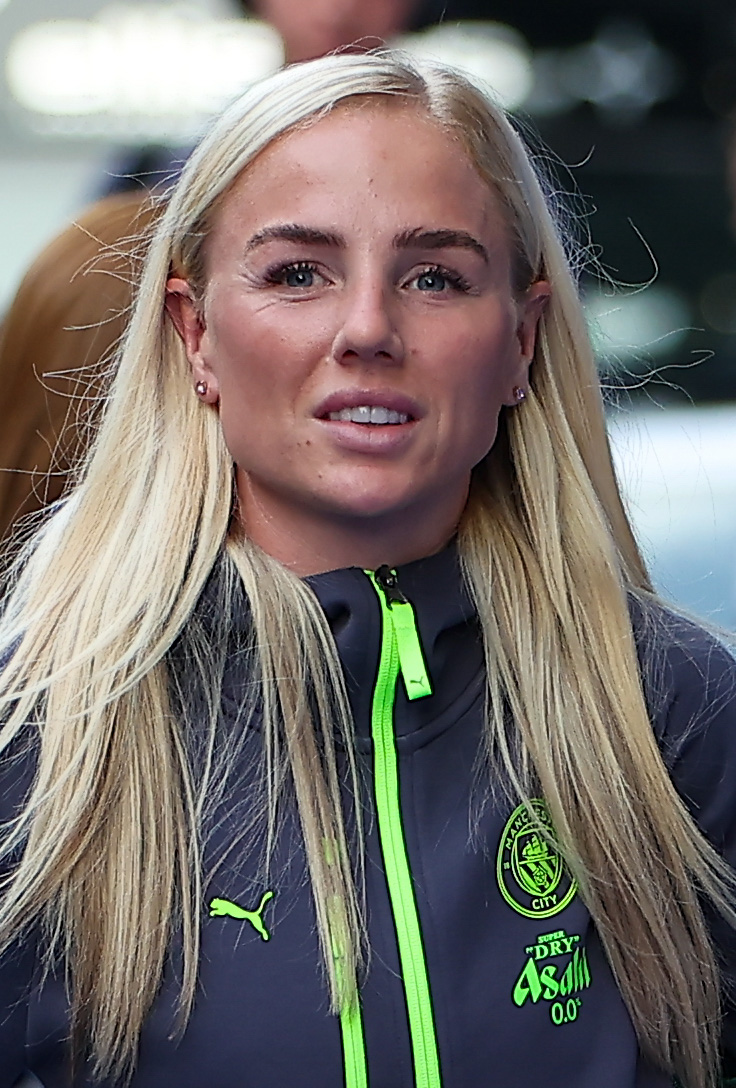
- Greenwood at Stamford Bridge in 2025

Personal information
- Full name: Alex Greenwood
- Date of birth: 7 September 1993 (age 33)
- Place of birth: Bootle, England
- Height: 5 ft 6 in (1.67 m)
- Positions: Centre-back; left-back

Team information
- Current team: Manchester City
- Number: 5

Youth career
- 2001–2010: Everton

Senior career*
Years	Team	Apps	(Gls)
2010–2014	Everton	43	(1)
2015	Notts County	14	(1)
2016–2018	Liverpool	32	(4)
2018–2019	Manchester United	18	(4)
2019–2020	Olympique Lyonnais	11	(0)
2020–	Manchester City	119	(6)

International career^{‡}
2008–2010	England U17	11	(1)
2010–2012	England U19	14	(1)
2013–2014	England U23	6	(0)
2014–	England	113	(7)
Medal record
Women's football
Representing England
UEFA Women's Championship
Winner	2022 England
Winner	2025 Switzerland
UEFA–CONMEBOL Finalissima
Winner	2023 England
FIFA Women's World Cup
Runner-up	2023 Australia and New Zealand
Bronze medal – third place	2015 Canada
- * Club domestic league appearances and goals as of 22:55, 1 November 2026 (UTC) ‡ National team caps and goals as of 23:45, 13 October 2026 (UTC)

Alex Greenwood (born 7 September 1993) is an English professional footballer who plays for Women's Super League club Manchester City, whom she captains, and the England national team. Primarily a left-sided defender, she plays as both a centre-back and a left-back. Greenwood began her senior career at Everton, Notts County and Liverpool, before playing for Olympique Lyonnais and winning Division 1 and the Champions League with the club. She also captained Manchester United, winning the Championship in their inaugural season. Greenwood is known for her tackling, positional play and passing; as a left-footed player she is a set-piece specialist, who often takes penalties, free kicks and corners.

Greenwood captained England at youth level, made her senior debut in 2014, and first captained the senior team in the 2023 Arnold Clark Cup. She was named the Young Player of the Year in 2012 and has been featured in the WSL Team of the Year three times. In the 2023 World Cup, Greenwood was named as one of the outstanding players of the tournament as England reached the final. Greenwood made her 100th appearance for Manchester City in a WSL game in October 2023. Greenwood was part of the England squad which won Euro 2022 and Euro 2025.

== Early life ==
Greenwood was born and grew up in Bootle and attended St Monica's RC Primary School, Bootle. She joined Everton aged six, initially for weekly training sessions at the club's former youth academy site at Netherton, whilst playing for local junior teams and then progressed through the club's Centre of Excellence from the age of eight to sign her first professional contract with the club. Greenwood was brought up supporting Merseyside rivals Liverpool and admired Jamie Carragher and Rachel Unitt. She also attended Savio Salesian College in Bootle.

== Club career ==
=== Everton (2010–2014) ===
Greenwood joined Everton at the age of six, initially through weekly training sessions at the club's former youth academy site at Netherton and she then progressed through the club's Centre of Excellence from the age of eight to sign a professional contract with the club. On 5 August 2010, a month before her 17th birthday, she made her first team debut in a 2010–11 UEFA Women's Champions League qualification round match against Faroese club KÍ. Everton won 6–0 win. Two days later, in the same competition, Greenwood scored a penalty in the 80th minute as Everton defeated Macedonian team FK Borec 10–0.

Everton's longstanding left-back Rachel Unitt signed for Birmingham City after 2011 FA WSL, the inaugural season of WSL, and Greenwood replaced her for 2012 FA WSL. During the season, she played for England's under-19 team at the 2012 UEFA Women's Under-19 Championship in Turkey. In November, she was named FA Young Player of the Year at The Football Association Women's Football Awards.

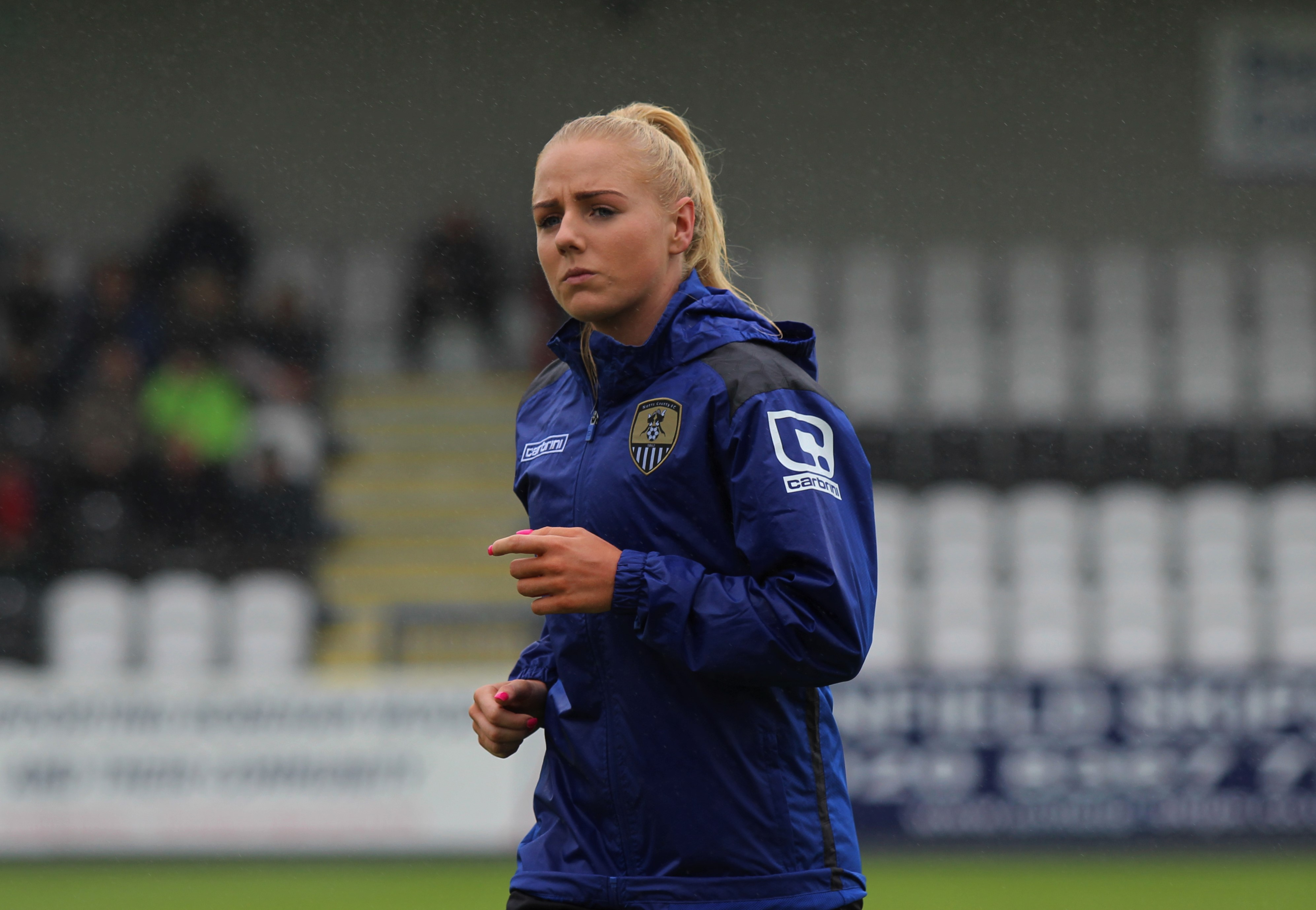
Greenwood warming up with Notts County before a match against Arsenal in 2015.

Greenwood played in Everton's 2–0 defeat by Arsenal in the 2013–14 FA Women's Cup final. Despite reaching the cup final, Everton were relegated at the end of 2014 FA WSL. Greenwood requested a transfer to protect her national team place ahead of the 2015 FIFA Women's World Cup. Ahead of 2015 FA WSL, she signed for Notts County on a two-year contract for an undisclosed transfer fee. The move disappointed Everton who wanted Greenwood to leave on loan and come back if they were promoted again.

=== Notts County (2015) ===
Greenwood spent only one season, 2015 FA WSL, with Notts County.

=== Liverpool (2016–2017) ===
In January 2016, she joined Liverpool. She scored in each of the three seasons spanning her two-year spell with Liverpool. Her first goal was a penalty against Sunderland. At the end of 2017–18 FA WSL, having made 44 appearances and scored six goals, Liverpool released her.

=== Manchester United (2018–2019) ===
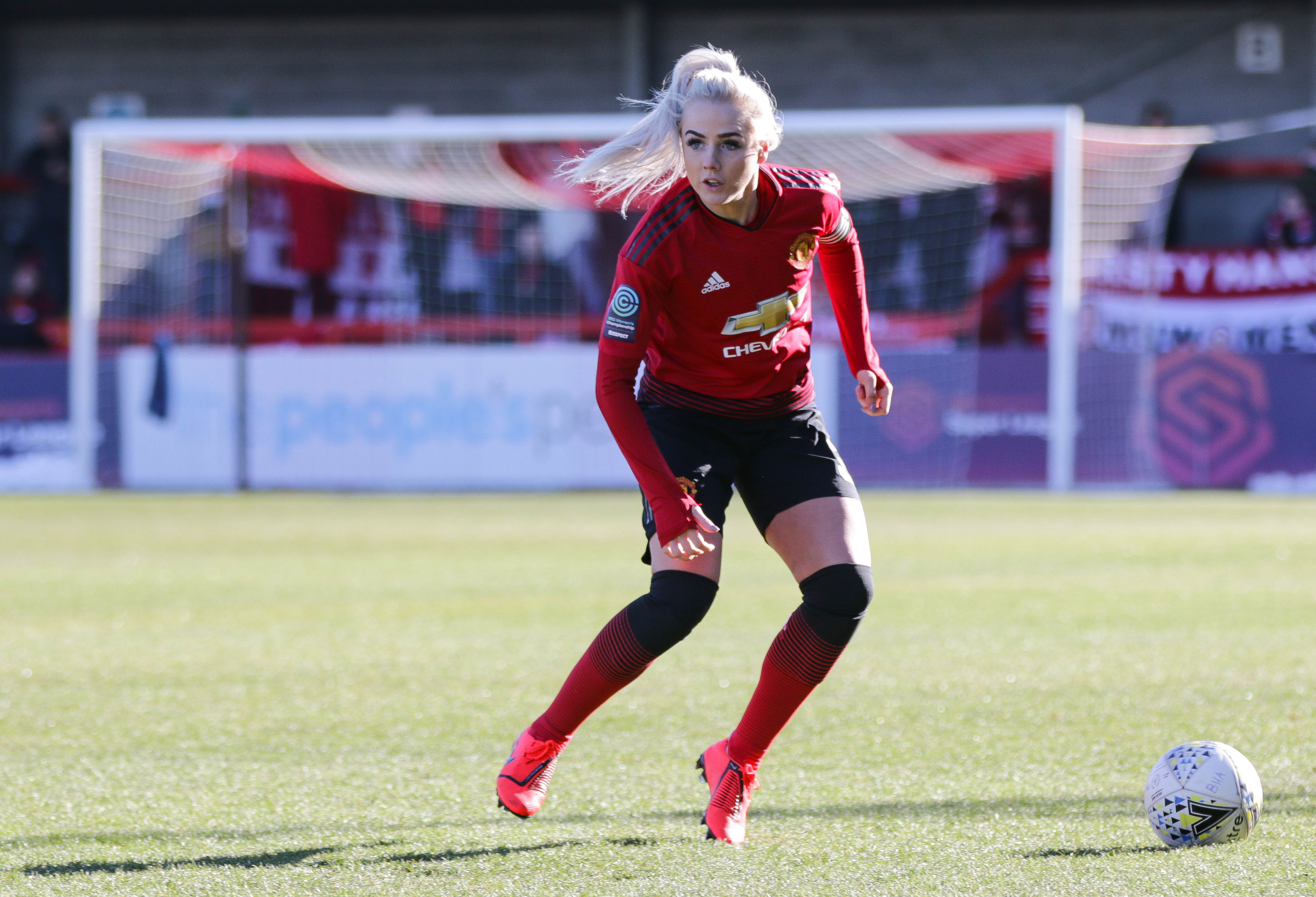
Greenwood playing for Manchester United against Brighton & Hove Albion in 2019

On 13 July 2018, it was announced that Greenwood was joining Manchester United and would captain the team in its inaugural season. She made her competitive debut for them in a 1–0 League Cup victory over her former club Liverpool on 19 August.

On 20 September, she made her Championship debut in a 3–0 win against Sheffield United. On 18 November, she scored her first goal for Manchester United with a penalty spot in a 5–0 away win at Crystal Palace. Under her leadership, Manchester United won the Championship and gained promotion to the FA WSL in their debut season.

=== Olympique Lyonnais (2019–2020) ===
On 4 August 2019, Manchester United announced they had agreed a deal for the transfer of Greenwood to French Division 1 Féminine team Olympique Lyonnais, subject to personal terms. Lyon confirmed the deal on 8 August for a fee of €40,000, plus €20,000 in potential add-ons. On 24 August, she made her league debut for the club in a 6–0 home win against Olympique Marseille.

On 30 August 2020, Greenwood made her first Champions League appearance since 2010, entering as a stoppage time substitute for Eugénie Le Sommer as Lyon beat Wolfsburg 3–1 in the final. By the end of her one-year contract with Lyon she had played 17 matches and won a quadruple of trophies including the Champions League.

=== Manchester City (2020–) ===
On 9 September 2020, Greenwood returned to England, signing a three-year contract with Manchester City following the expiration of her Lyon contract. One of her first games was the 2019–20 Women's FA Cup final at Wembley Stadium on 1 November 2020. City defeated Everton 3–1.

In the second match of the 2023–24 Women's Super League season, when Manchester City Women met Chelsea Women at the Joie Stadium, Greenwood received two yellow cards and was sent off in the 38th minute by referee Emily Heaslip. The first card was for a foul but the second was for time-wasting after Greenwood spent 26 seconds taking a free kick. Before the start of the season, referees had been ordered to clamp down on time-wasting but Heaslip's decision was controversial and invoked comments such as "ridiculous" and "shocking".

Following the retirement of Steph Houghton, Greenwood was announced as her successor as Manchester City's club captain on 20 September 2024. During a Champions League fixture against SKN St. Pölten on 12 December 2024, Greenwood suffered a Medial collateral ligament (MCL) knee injury which required her to undergo surgery. She returned to the pitch after a four-month absence on 27 April 2025, coming on as a substitute during Manchester City's 1–0 league win against Leicester City. On 12 November 2025, Greenwood extended her contract with the club until 2027. In the 2025–26 season, Greenwood captained City to a domestic double, winning both the WSL and the FA Cup and scoring in the final of the latter.

== International career ==
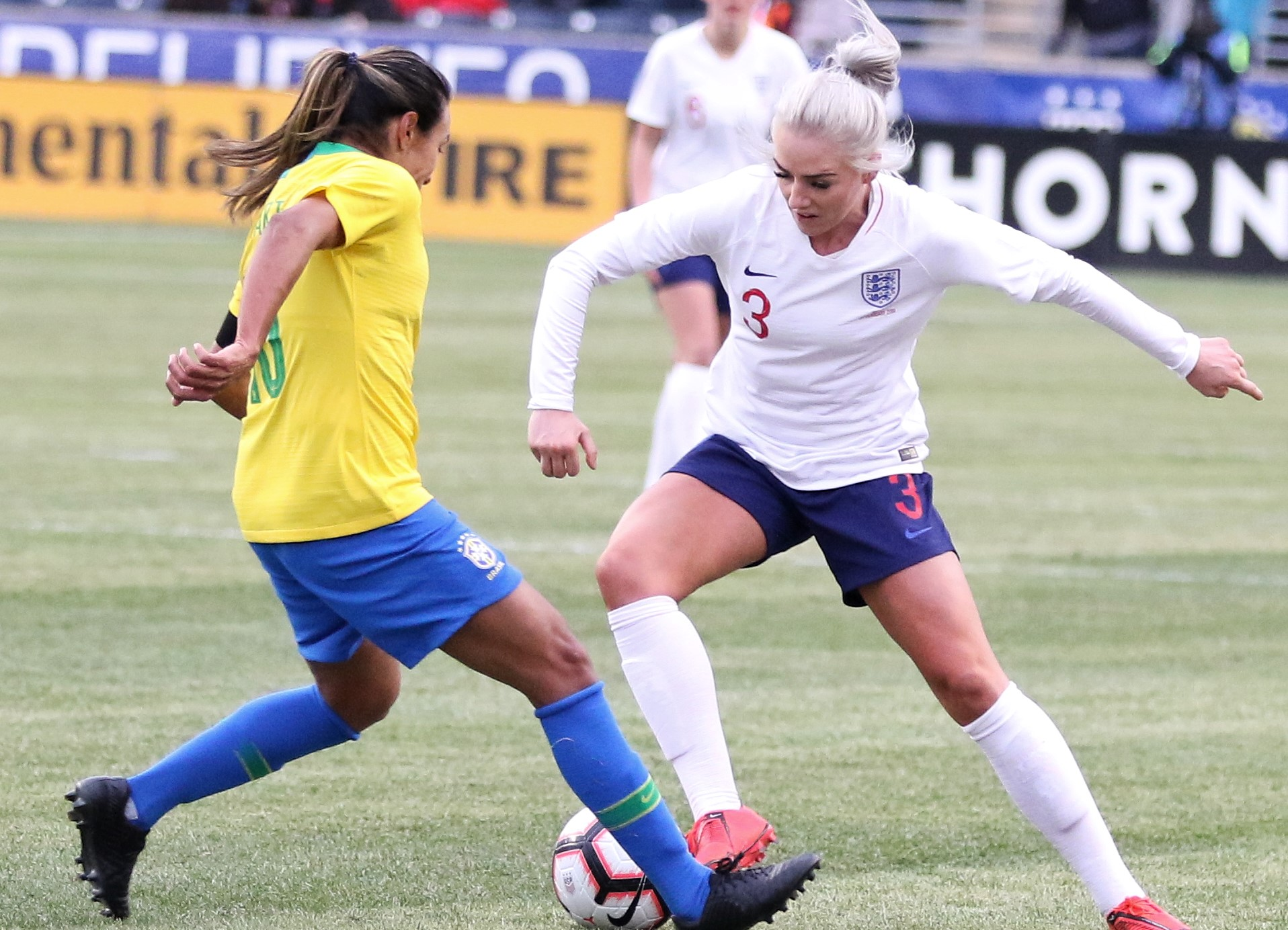
Greenwood (right) playing for England in the 2019 SheBelieves Cup

Greenwood captained England at youth level and played at the 2012 UEFA Women's Under-19 Championship. Senior national team coach Mark Sampson selected her for the 2014 Cyprus Cup, where she made her debut against Italy on 5 March 2014. She scored her first goal for England in September 2014 in a 10–0 win against Montenegro.

At the 2015 FIFA Women's World Cup, youngest member of the squad Greenwood shared England's left-back duties with Claire Rafferty. She won a bronze medal when the team beat Germany in the third place play-off. Although she was the youngest member of the squad, Greenwood was England's best left-footed exponent in dead-ball situations.

In 2019, Greenwood was part of the England team that won the SheBelieves Cup in the United States. Later that year, Greenwood was selected as part of England's World Cup squad. As part of England's social-media facing squad announcement, her name was announced by singer Olly Murs. On 23 June, Greenwood scored England's third goal in the 3–0 round of 16 win against Cameroon as England went on to finish fourth.

Greenwood was a member of the England squad that won UEFA Women's Euro 2022. She was allotted 184 when the FA announced their legacy numbers scheme to honour the 50th anniversary of England's inaugural international. Greenwood first captained England during an Arnold Clark Cup match on 19 February 2023, having previously worn the armband after a series of substitutions in England's 20–0 victory over Latvia on 30 November 2021, becoming the fourth captain in that match.

On 31 May 2023, Greenwood was included in the squad for the 2023 FIFA Women's World Cup taking place in Australia and New Zealand in July and August that year. Wearing the number 5 shirt, Greenwood played on the left side of England's back three with Jess Carter (right) and Millie Bright (centre). She played in all seven of England's matches and has been recognised as one of the most outstanding players in the tournament. Writing for BBC Sport, former international Karen Bardsley said Greenwood was "tremendous" both in defence and in possession of the ball. Praising Greenwood's positional play, her tackling and above all her defence-splitting passes, Bardsley rated Greenwood and Amanda Ilestedt as the tournament's two best centre backs. England reached the final but lost 1–0 to Spain. Play was held up for several minutes in the second half after Greenwood suffered a deep cut below her right eyebrow; she continued after lengthy treatment with her head bandaged.

On 6 June 2025, Greenwood was named in England's squad for UEFA Women's Euro 2025. She made her 100th appearance for England during their first match of the tournament, a 2–1 defeat against France on 5 July. On 27 July 2025, Greenwood started in the tournament's final and scored a penalty during the shootout to help England to victory over Spain and to win their second consecutive European title.

== Style of play ==
Greenwood has played as both a left-back and centre-back. She began her senior career mainly as a left-back before later being used regularly in central defence. Analyses of her playing style have discussed her passing from defensive positions, involvement in build-up play, and ability to carry the ball forward under pressure.Statistical reports have recorded high-pass completion figures and involvement in progressive passing and ball progression. Defensively, Greenwood is referred for her positioning, tackling and blocking.

== Personal life ==
Greenwood is in a relationship with ex-professional footballer Jack O'Connell. Greenwood has spoken out, on a number of occasions, about the online abuse that she and some of her colleagues receive regularly, which have included comments about her appearance, transfers and threats against her family. Greenwood generally opts to keep her personal life private and tends to keep her social media posts football-related. In June 2026, the pair announced their engagement.

As part of the "Where Greatness Is Made" campaign, a plaque honouring Greenwood was installed at Northfield Sports Association in Bootle in September 2022.

In October 2022, Greenwood was honoured with the creation by artist John Culshaw of a mural at 320 Stanley Road, in the centre of her home town of Bootle which is within the Metropolitan Borough of Sefton, to commemorate her part in Euro 2022. Greenwood commented: "It’s really important for me to be able to send a message to young girls in my area that anything is possible".

On 19 October 2023, Greenwood was awarded the Honorary Freedom of the Borough of Sefton which is the highest award the council can bestow on an individual. The Council resolution stated:

"This Council wishes to place on record its high appreciation of Alex Greenwood as an ambassador for Bootle and an outstanding role model for women and girls in sport and football, and in the light of her hard work, dedication and success, the Council resolves that the Honorary Freedom of the Borough be conferred on Alex Greenwood in recognition of her outstanding achievements."

Greenwood was awarded a MBE in the 2026 New Year Honours.

== Career statistics ==
=== Club ===
As of match played 1 November 2026

Appearances and goals by club, season and competition
Club	Season	League			National cup (Note: Includes the Women's FA Cup and Coupe de France féminine)		League cup (Note: Includes the WSL Cup, Women's League Cup)		Europe (Note: Includes the UEFA Women's Champions League)		Other		Total	
Club	Season	Division	Apps	Goals	Apps	Goals	Apps	Goals	Apps	Goals	Apps	Goals	Apps	Goals
Everton	2009–10	Women's Premier League	1	0	0	0	0	0	4	0	—		5	0
Everton	2011	Women's Super League	7	0	0	0	—		—		—		7	0
Everton	2012	Women's Super League	10	0	0	0	3	0	—		—		13	0
Everton	2013	Women's Super League	12	1	0	0	3	0	—		—		15	1
Everton	2014	Women's Super League	14	0	0	0	5	0	—		—		19	0
Everton	Total		44	1	0	0	11	0	4	0	0	0	59	1
Notts County	2015	Women's Super League	14	1	0	0	8	3	—		—		22	4
Liverpool	2016	Women's Super League	8	1	0	0	1	0	—		—		9	1
Liverpool	2017	Women's Super League	6	2	0	0	0	0	—		—		6	2
Liverpool	2017–18	Women's Super League	18	1	0	0	5	1	—		—		23	2
Liverpool	Total		32	4	0	0	6	1	0	0	0	0	38	5
Manchester United	2018–19	Championship	18	4	3	1	6	0	—		—		27	5
Olympique Lyonnais	2019–20	D1 Féminine	11	0	4	0	—		1	0	1 (Note: Appearance in Trophée des Championnes)	0	17	0
Manchester City	2020–21	Women's Super League	18	0	4	1	4	0	6	0	—		32	1
Manchester City	2021–22	Women's Super League	22	4	5	0	7	0	2	0	—		36	4
Manchester City	2022–23	Women's Super League	21	0	3	0	3	0	2	0	—		29	0
Manchester City	2023–24	Women's Super League	20	1	3	0	4	0	—		—		27	1
Manchester City	2024–25	Women's Super League	12	0	0	0	0	0	7	0	—		19	0
Manchester City	2025–26	Women's Super League	18	0	5	1	4	0	—		—		27	1
Manchester City	2026–27	Women's Super League	8	1	0	0	—		3	0	—		11	1
Manchester City	Total		119	6	20	2	22	0	20	0	0	0	181	8
Career total			238	16	27	3	53	4	25	0	1	0	344	23

=== International ===
As of match played 13 October 2026

Appearances and goals by national team and year
National team	Year	Apps	Goals
England	2014	6	1
England	2015	8	0
England	2016	6	1
England	2017	6	0
England	2018	6	0
England	2019	11	1
England	2020	2	0
England	2021	9	2
England	2022	16	0
England	2023	18	1
England	2024	8	1
England	2025	11	0
England	2026	6	0
Total		113	7

Scores and results list England's goal tally first, score column indicates score after each Greenwood goal.

List of international goals scored by Alex Greenwood
No.	Date	Venue	Opponent	Score	Result	Competition	Ref.
1	17 September 2014	Stadion Pod Malim Brdom, Petrovac, Montenegro	Montenegro	8–0	10–0	2015 FIFA World Cup qualification	
2	4 June 2016	Adams Park, Wycombe, England	Serbia	1–0	7–0	UEFA Euro 2017 qualification	
3	23 June 2019	Stade du Hainaut, Valenciennes, France	Cameroon	3–0	3–0	2019 FIFA World Cup	
4	21 September 2021	Stade de Luxembourg, Luxembourg City, Luxembourg	Luxembourg	4–0	10–0	2023 FIFA World Cup qualification	
5	21 September 2021	Stade de Luxembourg, Luxembourg City, Luxembourg	Luxembourg	5–0	10–0	2023 FIFA World Cup qualification	
6	5 December 2023	Hampden Park, Glasgow, Scotland	Scotland	1–0	6–0	2023–24 UEFA Nations League A	
7	9 April 2024	Aviva Stadium, Dublin, Republic of Ireland	Republic of Ireland	2–0	2–0	UEFA Euro 2025 qualification	

== Honours ==
Manchester United

- FA Women's Championship: 2018–19

Olympique Lyonnais

- Trophée des Championnes: 2019
- Division 1 Féminine: 2019–20
- Coupe de France: 2019–20
- UEFA Women's Champions League: 2019–20

Manchester City

- Women's Super League: 2025–26
- Women's FA Cup: 2019–20, 2025–26
- FA WSL Cup: 2021–22

England

- FIFA Women's World Cup runner-up: 2023; third place: 2015
- UEFA Women's Championship: 2022, 2025
- Women's Finalissima: 2023
- Cyprus Cup: 2015
- SheBelieves Cup: 2019
- Arnold Clark Cup: 2022, 2023

Individual

- FA Young Player of the Year: 2012
- PFA WSL Team of the Year: 2015–16, 2021–22, 2022–23, 2023–24
- FIFA FIFPRO Women's World 11: 2023, 2024

State and civic honours

- Honorary Freedom of the City of London: 2022
- Honorary Freedom of the Metropolitan Borough of Sefton: 2023
- Member of the Order of the British Empire (MBE) for services to association football: 2026 New Year Honours
