= Madison Haley =

American soccer player (born 1998)

- Haley with Brighton & Hove Albion in 2024

Personal information
- Full name: Madison Camille Haley
- Date of birth: October 25, 1998 (age 28)
- Place of birth: Dallas, Texas, United States
- Height: 1.70 m (5 ft 7 in)
- Position: Forward

Team information
- Current team: Brighton & Hove Albion
- Number: 9

Youth career
- Dallas Texans SC
- 2014–2017: Ursuline Academy

College career
Years	Team	Apps	(Gls)
2017–2021	Stanford Cardinal	76	(20)

Senior career*
Years	Team	Apps	(Gls)
2022–2023	Sydney FC	15	(11)
2023–	Brighton & Hove Albion	47	(7)
- * Club domestic league appearances and goals as of 20 September 2026

Madison Camille Haley (born August 21, 1998) is an American professional soccer player currently playing for Brighton & Hove Albion in the English Women's Super League.

== Youth career ==
Haley attended Ursuline Academy of Dallas, where she played soccer as a striker. She also played youth club soccer for Dallas Texans SC, competing with the U17 Elite Clubs National League team as a 15-year-old, and was named the top girls' soccer player of the 2017 high school graduating class by TopDrawerSoccer.com in December 2013.

== College career ==
Haley committed to Stanford University as a high school sophomore in 2015 and began playing for Stanford Cardinal as a collegiate freshman in 2017. The team went undefeated throughout the 2017 NCAA Division I season, winning the Pac-12 Conference having finished on 33 points having won all 11 matches, before progressing through to the 2017 NCAA Division I women's soccer tournament, where Stanford continued their undefeated run and reached the finals in Orlando, Florida. Stanford defeated the UCLA Bruins 3–2 in the championship match.

Haley repeated the success with the Cardinal just two years later in the 2019 NCAA Division I as the Cardinal went on another undefeated streak and defeated North Carolina in the championship match 5–4 on a penalty shoot-out after the game finished 0–0.

=== Club career ===
Due to the impact of the COVID-19 pandemic on sports, the National Women's Soccer League (NWSL) allowed teams in the 2021 NWSL Draft to select any college senior regardless of whether they had registered, which Haley had not done because she was planning on continuing her college career and completing her master's degree at Stanford. NWSL club Chicago Red Stars selected Haley with the seventh-overall pick in the draft, but Haley instead completed her final season at Stanford, after which she did not report to the Red Stars or sign a contract with the team.

=== Sydney FC ===
After earning her master's degree, Haley signed for Sydney FC in the A-League for the 2022–23 season. She scored her first goal for the club in the Round 2, 2–0 win against Melbourne Victory. Despite a mid-season injury, Haley completed the regular season with 8 goals and Sydney secured their third consecutive Premiership. Haley scored 2 goals against Western United in the 4–0 Grand Final victory, earning Player of the match honors.

=== Brighton & Hove Albion ===
On July 17, 2023, Haley signed for Brighton & Hove Albion in the English Women's Super League. On May 23, 2025, she signed a new contract for Brighton.

== International career ==
Haley has been called up to various United States training camps at under-14, under-15, and under-17, and under-18 youth levels. She was a member of the United States under-17 national team squad that finished third during the 2013 CONCACAF U-17 Championship.

== Personal life ==
She is the daughter of former five-time National Football League Super Bowl winner Charles Haley.

== Career statistics ==
=== Club ===
As of match played 20 September 2026.

Appearances and goals by club, season and competition
Club	Season	League			National cup (Note: Includes the FA Cup)		League cup (Note: Includes the League Cup)		Total	
Club	Season	Division	Apps	Goals	Apps	Goals	Apps	Goals	Apps	Goals
Sydney FC	2022-23	A-League Women	15	11	—		—		15	11
Brighton & Hove Albion	2023–24	WSL	13	2	1	0	2	0	16	2
Brighton & Hove Albion	2024–25	WSL	15	1	2	0	3	0	20	1
Brighton & Hove Albion	2025–26	WSL	16	4	5	3	0	0	21	7
Brighton & Hove Albion	2026–27	WSL	3	0	0	0	0	0	3	0
Brighton & Hove Albion	Total		47	7	8	3	5	0	60	10
Career total			62	18	8	3	5	0	75	21

== Honors ==
Stanford Cardinal

- National Collegiate Athletic Association – Pac-12 Conference: 2017, 2018, 2019
- NCAA Division I Women's Soccer Championship: 2017, 2019

Sydney FC

- A-League Women Premiership: 2022–23
- A-League Women Championship: 2023

Individual

- A-League Women Goal of the Year: 2022–23
- A-League Women Grand Final Player of the Match: 2023
