= Kiko Seike =

Japanese footballer (born 1996)

Kiko Seike 清家 貴子
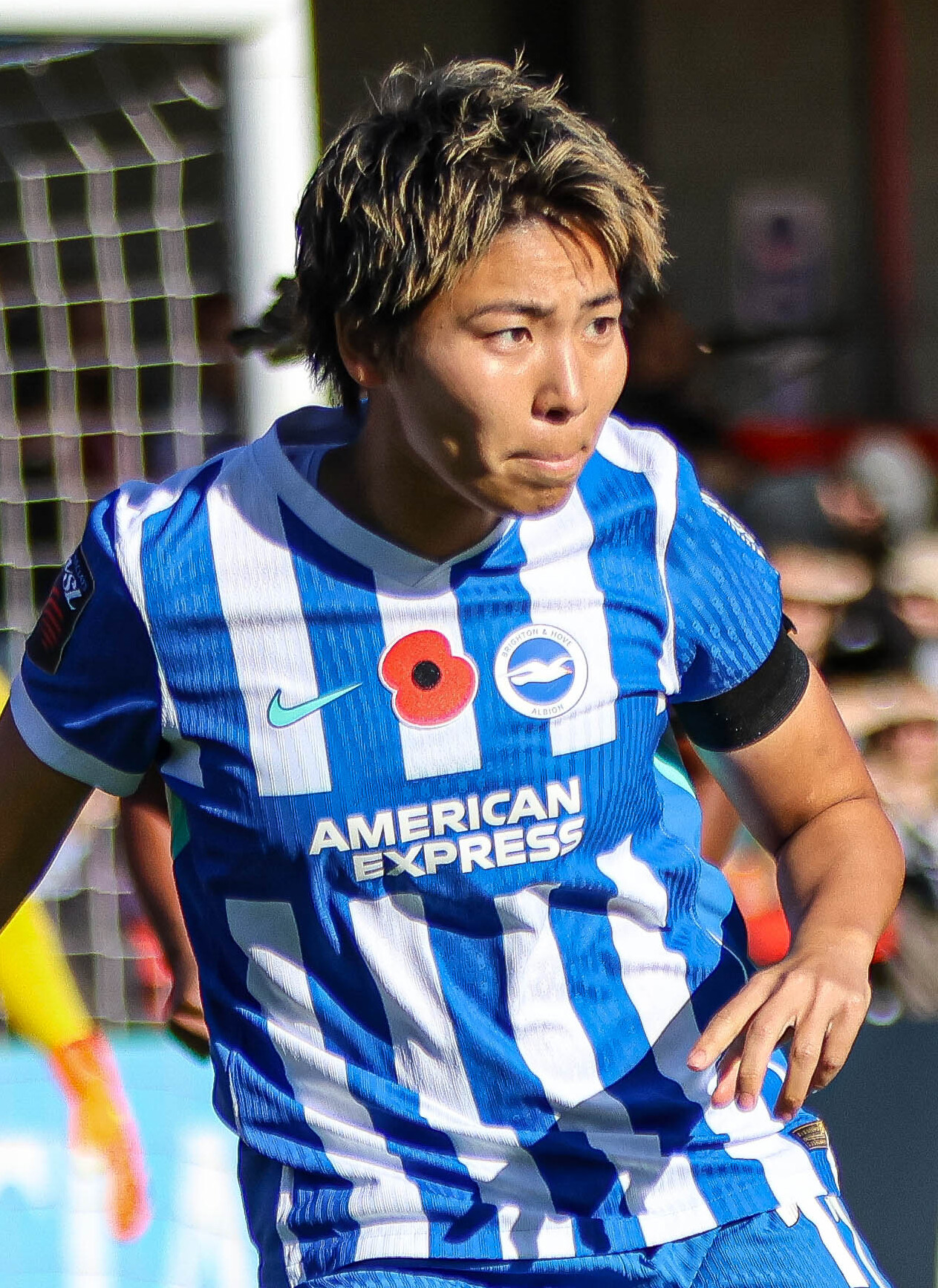
- Seike with Brighton & Hove Albion in 2025

Personal information
- Date of birth: 8 August 1996 (age 30)
- Place of birth: Tokyo, Japan
- Height: 1.66 m (5 ft 5 in)
- Positions: Forward; midfielder; defender

Team information
- Current team: Brighton & Hove Albion
- Number: 11

Youth career
- Urawa Reds

Senior career*
| Years | Team | Apps | (Gls) |
| 2014–2024 | Urawa Reds | 168 | (59) |
| 2024– | Brighton & Hove Albion | 46 | (17) |

International career^{‡}
| 2015 | Japan U19 | 5 | (3) |
| 2019– | Japan | 41 | (16) |
- * Club domestic league appearances and goals as of 22 November 2026 ‡ National team caps and goals as of 13 October 2026

Kiko Seike (清家 貴子, Seike Kiko; IPA: [seːke kiko]; born 8 August 1996) is a Japanese professional footballer who plays as a forward for Women's Super League club Brighton & Hove Albion and the Japan national team.

== Club career ==
On 4 July 2024, Seike signed for Brighton & Hove Albion on undisclosed terms. She made her competitive debut for the club in a 4–0 league match win against Everton on 21 September 2024, where she scored a hat-trick. She became the first player in Women's Super League history to score a hat-trick on her debut in the competition. She won the Women's Super League player of the month and the PFA WSL fans player of the month for September 2024. On 25 January 2026, it was announced that she had signed a new contract with Brighton.

== International career ==
Seike was called up to the senior national team for the first time for the match against Canada in October 2019, but she remained an unused substitute. She was called up again for the senior side for the EAFF E-1 Football Championship that same year. She would make her competitive debut for the national team on 11 December 2019 against Chinese Taipei, scoring her maiden senior side goal in the same match.

On 13 June 2023, she was included in Japan's 23-player squad for the FIFA World Cup 2023.

On 14 June 2024, Seike was included in the Japan squad for the 2024 Summer Olympics.

== Career statistics ==
=== Club ===
As of match played 22 November 2026

Appearances and goals by club, season and competition
| Club | Season | League | | | National cup (Note: Includes Empress's Cup, Women's FA Cup) | | League cup (Note: Includes Nadeshiko League Cup, WE League Cup, FA Women's League Cup) | | Continental (Note: AFC Women's Club Championship) | | Total | |
| Club | Season | Division | Apps | Goals | Apps | Goals | Apps | Goals | Apps | Goals | Apps | Goals |
|---|---|---|---|---|---|---|---|---|---|---|---|---|
| Urawa Reds | 2014 | Nadeshiko League | 24 | 8 | 4 | 3 | — | | — | | 28 | 11 |
| Urawa Reds | 2015 | Nadeshiko League | 20 | 9 | 0 | 0 | — | | — | | 20 | 9 |
| Urawa Reds | 2016 | Nadeshiko League | 2 | 0 | 0 | 0 | 0 | 0 | — | | 2 | 0 |
| Urawa Reds | 2017 | Nadeshiko League | 9 | 0 | 2 | 1 | 9 | 0 | — | | 20 | 1 |
| Urawa Reds | 2018 | Nadeshiko League | 16 | 2 | 1 | 0 | 6 | 2 | — | | 23 | 4 |
| Urawa Reds | 2019 | Nadeshiko League | 18 | 4 | 5 | 3 | 9 | 1 | — | | 32 | 8 |
| Urawa Reds | 2020 | Nadeshiko League | 17 | 1 | 5 | 1 | — | | — | | 22 | 2 |
| Urawa Reds | 2021–22 | WE League | 20 | 3 | 4 | 1 | — | | — | | 24 | 4 |
| Urawa Reds | 2022–23 | WE League | 20 | 12 | 1 | 0 | 6 | 2 | — | | 27 | 14 |
| Urawa Reds | 2023–24 | WE League | 22 | 20 | 4 | 1 | 4 | 1 | 4 | 7 | 34 | 29 |
| Urawa Reds | Total | | 168 | 59 | 26 | 10 | 34 | 6 | 4 | 7 | 232 | 82 |
| Brighton & Hove Albion | 2024–25 | Women's Super League | 18 | 6 | 0 | 0 | 3 | 0 | — | | 21 | 6 |
| Brighton & Hove Albion | 2025–26 | Women's Super League | 19 | 7 | 5 | 1 | 3 | 2 | — | | 27 | 10 |
| Brighton & Hove Albion | 2026–27 | Women's Super League | 9 | 4 | 0 | 0 | 3 | 0 | — | | 12 | 4 |
| Brighton & Hove Albion | Total | | 46 | 17 | 5 | 1 | 9 | 2 | 0 | 0 | 60 | 20 |
| Career total | | | 214 | 76 | 31 | 11 | 43 | 8 | 4 | 7 | 292 | 102 |

=== International ===
As of match played 13 October 2026

Appearances and goals by national team and year
| National team | Year | Apps | Goals |
|---|---|---|---|
| Japan | 2019 | 2 | 1 |
| Japan | 2022 | 4 | 1 |
| Japan | 2023 | 10 | 4 |
| Japan | 2024 | 11 | 1 |
| Japan | 2025 | 6 | 2 |
| Japan | 2026 | 8 | 7 |
| Total | | 41 | 16 |

Scores and results list Japan's goal tally first, score column indicates score after each Seike goal.

List of international goals scored by Kiko Seike
| No. | Date | Venue | Opponent | Score | Result | Competition |
|---|---|---|---|---|---|---|
| 1 | 11 December 2019 | Busan Asiad Main Stadium, Busan, South Korea | Chinese Taipei | 7–0 | 9–0 | 2019 EAFF E-1 Football Championship |
| 2 | 23 July 2022 | Kashima Soccer Stadium, Ibaraki, Japan | Chinese Taipei | 3–1 | 4–1 | 2022 EAFF E-1 Football Championship |
| 3 | 22 February 2023 | Toyota Stadium, Frisco, United States | Canada | 1–0 | 3–0 | 2023 SheBelieves Cup |
| 4 | 23 September 2023 | Kitakyushu Stadium, Kitakyushu, Japan | Argentina | 5–0 | 8–0 | Friendly |
| 5 | 23 September 2023 | Kitakyushu Stadium, Kitakyushu, Japan | Argentina | 8–0 | 8–0 | Friendly |
| 6 | 26 October 2023 | Lokomotiv Stadium, Tashkent, Uzbekistan | India | 6–0 | 7–0 | 2024 AFC Women's Olympic Qualifying Tournament |
| 7 | 6 April 2024 | Mercedes-Benz Stadium, Atlanta, United States | United States | 1–0 | 1–2 | 2024 SheBelieves Cup |
| 8 | 30 May 2025 | Arena Corinthians, São Paulo, Brazil | Brazil | 1–3 | 1–3 | Friendly |
| 9 | 3 June 2025 | Estádio Cícero de Souza Marques, São Paulo, Brazil | Brazil | 1–0 | 1–2 | Friendly |
| 10 | 4 March 2026 | Perth Rectangular Stadium, Perth, Australia | Chinese Taipei | 2–0 | 2–0 | 2026 AFC Women's Asian Cup |
| 11 | 7 March 2026 | Perth Rectangular Stadium, Perth, Australia | India | 5–0 | 11–0 | 2026 AFC Women's Asian Cup |
| 12 | 7 March 2026 | Perth Rectangular Stadium, Perth, Australia | India | 8–0 | 11–0 | 2026 AFC Women's Asian Cup |
| 13 | 10 March 2026 | Perth Rectangular Stadium, Perth, Australia | Vietnam | 4–0 | 4–0 | 2026 AFC Women's Asian Cup |
| 14 | 6 June 2026 | Yodoko Sakura Stadium, Osaka, Japan | South Africa | 1–0 | 5–0 | Friendly |
| 15 | 6 June 2026 | Yodoko Sakura Stadium, Osaka, Japan | South Africa | 2–0 | 5–0 | Friendly |
| 16 | 9 October 2026 | Stade Bauer, Saint-Ouen-sur-Seine, France | Haiti | 1–0 | 5–1 | Friendly |

== Honours ==
Urawa Red Diamonds

- WE League: 2022–23, 2023–24
- Nadeshiko League Division 1: 2014, 2020
- Empress's Cup: 2021, 2024
- AFC Women's Club Championship: 2023
- WE League Cup: 2022–23
- Nadeshiko League Cup: 2017

Japan

- EAFF Women's Football Championship: 2022
- SheBelieves Cup: 2025
- Asian Cup: 2026

Individual

- AFC Women's Footballer of the Year: 2023
- WE League Most Valuable Player Award: 2023–24
- WE League top scorer: 2023–24
- WSL Player of the Month: September 2024
