= 2023–24 Manchester City W.F.C. season =

Manchester City Women
2023–24 season
- Chairman: Khaldoon Mubarak
- Manager: Gareth Taylor
- Stadium: Academy Stadium
- WSL: 2nd
- FA Cup: Quarter-finals
- League Cup: Semi-finals
- Top goalscorer: League: Khadija Shaw (21); All: Khadija Shaw (22)
- Highest home attendance: 40,086 (vs. Manchester United, 23 March)
- Lowest home attendance: 2,134 (vs. Tottenham Hotspur, 26 November)
- Average home league attendance: 7,108
| Home colours | Away colours | Third colours |

The 2023–24 season was Manchester City Women's Football Club's 36th season of competitive football and their 11th season in the Women's Super League, the highest level of English women's football.

== Pre-season ==
| 2 September 2023 Friendly | Manchester City | 3–2 | Bristol City | Manchester |
| | Castellanos; Aspin (o.g.); Shaw | Report | Harrison (pen.); Furness | Stadium: Academy Stadium; Attendance: Behind-closed-doors |

| 9 September 2023 Friendly | Manchester City | 1–0 | Liverpool | Manchester |
| | Coombs 75' | Report | | Stadium: Academy Stadium; Attendance: Behind-closed-doors |

| 16 September 2023 Friendly | Everton | 3–4 | Manchester City | Liverpool |
| | Piemonte 26'; Sørensen 69', 78' | Report | Fowler 39', 89'; Mace 64'; Morgan 86' | Stadium: Walton Hall Park; Attendance: Behind-closed-doors |

== Competitions ==
=== Women's Super League ===
==== Results summary ====
| Overall | | | | | | | | Home | | | | | | Away | | | | | |
| Pld | W | D | L | GF | GA | GD | Pts | W | D | L | GF | GA | GD | W | D | L | GF | GA | GD |
|---|---|---|---|---|---|---|---|---|---|---|---|---|---|---|---|---|---|---|---|
| 22 | 18 | 1 | 3 | 61 | 15 | +46 | 55 | 8 | 1 | 2 | 33 | 8 | +25 | 10 | 0 | 1 | 28 | 7 | +21 |

Last updated: 18 May 2024.
Source: WSL

==== Results by matchday ====
| Round | 1 | 2 | 3 | 4 | 5 | 6 | 7 | 8 | 9 | 10 | 11 | 12 | 13 | 14 | 15 | 16 | 17 | 18 | 19 | 20 | 21 | 22 |
|---|---|---|---|---|---|---|---|---|---|---|---|---|---|---|---|---|---|---|---|---|---|---|
| Ground | A | H | H | A | A | H | A | H | H | A | H | A | H | A | H | A | H | A | H | A | H | A |
| Result | W | D | W | W | L | L | W | W | W | W | W | W | W | W | W | W | W | W | W | W | L | W |
| Position | 2 | 3 | 1 | 1 | 2 | 6 | 3 | 3 | 3 | 2 | 2 | 2 | 2 | 2 | 2 | 2 | 2 | 1 | 1 | 1 | 2 | 2 |

A = Away; H = Home; W = Win; D = Draw; L = Loss

==== Results ====
| 1 October 2023 1 | West Ham United | 0–2 | Manchester City | Dagenham |
| 15:00 | Cissoko (yellow card) 90+5' | Report | Castellanos (yellow card) 16'; Hemp 48'; Roord 55'; Ouahabi (red card) 71' | Stadium: Victoria Road; Attendance: 2,032; Referee: Abigail Bryne |

| 8 October 2023 2 | Manchester City | 1–1 | Chelsea | Manchester |
| 12:30 | Kelly 7', (yellow card) 39'; Greenwood (yellow card) 17' (yellow-red card) 38'; Aleixandri (yellow card) 38'; Roord (yellow card) 45+4'; Hemp (yellow card) 67' (yellow-red card) 81' | Report | James (yellow card) 11'; Reiten 90+6'; Čanković (yellow card) 90+8' | Stadium: Academy Stadium; Attendance: 5,249; Referee: Emily Heaslip |

| 15 October 2023 3 | Manchester City | 5–0 | Bristol City | Manchester |
| 13:00 | Roord 9', 45+2'; Aleixandri 33'; Shaw 38', 45+6' | Report | Rodgers (yellow card) 48' | Stadium: Academy Stadium; Attendance: 3,789; Referee: Stacey Fullicks |

| 21 October 2023 4 | Leicester City | 0–1 | Manchester City | Leicester |
| 17:15 | O'Brien (yellow card) 85' | Report | Kelly 10'; Angeldahl (yellow card) 90' | Stadium: King Power Stadium; Attendance: 2,447; Referee: Farai Hallam |

| 5 November 2023 5 | Arsenal | 2–1 | Manchester City | Borehamwood |
| 12:30 | Wälti (yellow card) 6'; Lacasse (yellow card) 7'; Catley 14'; Pelova (yellow card) 34'; Foord (yellow card) 53'; Blackstenius 87'; McCabe (yellow card) 90+9' | Report | Hemp (yellow card) 13'; Keating (yellow card) 18'; Ouahabi (yellow card) 35'; Kelly 72' | Stadium: Meadow Park; Attendance: 3,453; Referee: Rebecca Welch |

| 12 November 2023 6 | Manchester City | 0–1 | Brighton & Hove Albion | Manchester |
| 13:00 | | Report | Lee 81' | Stadium: Academy Stadium; Attendance: 2,885; Referee: Stacey Pearson |

| 19 November 2023 7 | Manchester United | 1–3 | Manchester City | Trafford |
| 16:30 | Zelem 21' (pen.); Malard (yellow card) 68' | Report | Greenwood (yellow card) 21'; Roord 34'; Hemp 35'; Aleixandri (yellow card) 48' (yellow-red card) 72'; Shaw 55' | Stadium: Old Trafford; Attendance: 43,615; Referee: Cheryl Foster |

| 26 November 2023 8 | Manchester City | 7–0 | Tottenham Hotspur | Manchester |
| 18:45 | Angeldahl (yellow card) 15'; Shaw 23', 32', 38'; Roord (yellow card) 27', (goal) 53'; Hemp 48'; Coombs 59', 90+6' | Report | Bartrip (yellow card) 74' | Stadium: Academy Stadium; Attendance: 2,134; Referee: Richie Watkins |

| 9 December 2023 9 | Manchester City | 2–1 | Aston Villa | Manchester |
| 12:00 | Hemp 61', 65' | Report | Turner 7'; Corsie (yellow card) 30'; Mayling (yellow card) 75' | Stadium: Academy Stadium; Attendance: 3,047; Referee: Abigail Byrne |

| 17 December 2023 10 | Everton | 1–4 | Manchester City | Liverpool |
| 13:00 | Galli 56'; S. Holmgaard (yellow card) 57'; Payne (yellow card) 61' | Report | Shaw 9', 22', 65'; Roord 25'; Kelly (yellow card) 62' | Stadium: Walton Hall Park; Attendance: 1,167; Referee: Stacey Pearson |

| 21 January 2024 11 | Manchester City | 5–1 | Liverpool | Manchester |
| 14:00 | Bonner 19' (o.g.); Shaw 32', 45+7', 56'; Kelly 78' (pen.) | Report | Hinds 15'; Fisk (yellow card) 48'; Micah (yellow card) 75' | Stadium: Academy Stadium; Attendance: 4,599; Referee: Kirsty Dowle |

| 28 January 2024 12 | Tottenham Hotspur | 0–2 | Manchester City | Leyton |
| 14:00 | Summanen (yellow card) 45+1'; Ahtinen (yellow card) 70' | Report | Turner 9' (o.g.); Shaw 51' | Stadium: Brisbane Road; Attendance: 2,889; Referee: Melissa Burgin |

| 4 February 2024 13 | Manchester City | 2–0 | Leicester City | Manchester |
| 13:00 | Hemp 82'; Kelly 85' | Report | Nevin (yellow card) 9'; Takarada (yellow card) 26'; O'Brien (yellow card) 57'; Howard (yellow card) 66' | Stadium: Academy Stadium; Attendance: 3,383; Referee: Lisa Benn |

| 16 February 2024 14 | Chelsea | 0–1 | Manchester City | Kingston upon Thames |
| 19:15 | Cuthbert (yellow card) 52'; James (yellow card) 84' | Report | Shaw 14'; Kelly (yellow card) 54' | Stadium: Kingsmeadow; Attendance: 3,284; Referee: Abigail Byrne |

| 2 March 2024 15 | Manchester City | 2–1 | Everton | Manchester |
| 12:00 | Shaw 15'; Hemp 55' | Report | Bennison 60' | Stadium: Academy Stadium; Attendance: 3,223; Referee: Lauren Impey |

| 17 March 2024 16 | Brighton & Hove Albion | 1–4 | Manchester City | Crawley |
| 12:30 | Carabalí (yellow card) 65'; McEwen (yellow card) 85'; Lee 90+1'; Symonds (yellow card) 90+3' | Report | Hemp 27'; Fowler 40'; Shaw 69'; Coombs 78' | Stadium: Broadfield Stadium; Attendance: 3,490; Referee: Marc Wilson |

| 23 March 2024 17 | Manchester City | 3–1 | Manchester United | Manchester |
| 12:30 | Park 37', 45'; Shaw 46' | Report | Blundell (yellow card) 21'; Casparij 74' (o.g.); Geyse (yellow card) 90+2' | Stadium: City of Manchester Stadium; Attendance: 40,086; Referee: Abigail Byrne |

| 30 March 2024 18 | Liverpool | 1–4 | Manchester City | Birkenhead |
| 12:30 | Kearns (yellow card) 72'; Holland (yellow card) 79'; Keating 84' (o.g.) | Report | Hemp 16'; Park 22'; Shaw 24', 50' | Stadium: Prenton Park; Attendance: 3,377; Referee: Phoebe Cross |

| 21 April 2024 19 | Manchester City | 5–0 | West Ham United | Manchester |
| 14:15 | Ouahabi 1'; Shaw 3', 24'; Greenwood (yellow card) 74'; Blindkilde Brown 81'; Park 86' | Report | Shimizu (yellow card) 59'; Cissoko (yellow card) 84' | Stadium: Academy Stadium; Attendance: 4,385; Referee: Abigail Byrne |

| 28 April 2024 20 | Bristol City | 0–4 | Manchester City | Bristol |
| 18:45 | | Report | Fowler 62', 75'; Rodgers 77' (o.g.); Greenwood 90+9' | Stadium: Ashton Gate; Attendance: 8,749; Referee: Cheryl Foster |

| 5 May 2024 21 | Manchester City | 1–2 | Arsenal | Manchester |
| 14:15 | Hemp 17', (yellow card) 81'; Coombs (yellow card) 36'; Ouahabi (yellow card) 74' | Report | Blackstenius 89', 90+2'; Lacasse (yellow card) 51' | Stadium: Academy Stadium; Attendance: 5,409; Referee: Rebecca Welch |

| 18 May 2024 22 | Aston Villa | 1–2 | Manchester City | Walsall |
| 15:00 | Daly 68'; Parker (yellow card) 90+1' | Report | Fowler 21'; Hemp 77' | Stadium: Bescot Stadium; Attendance: 8,912; Referee: Kirsty Dowle |

==== League table ====
| Pos | Team | Pld | W | D | L | GF | GA | GD | Pts | Qualification or relegation |
|---|---|---|---|---|---|---|---|---|---|---|
| 1 | Chelsea (C) | 22 | 18 | 1 | 3 | 71 | 18 | +53 | 55 | Qualification for the Champions League group stage |
| 2 | Manchester City | 22 | 18 | 1 | 3 | 61 | 15 | +46 | 55 | Qualification for the Champions League second round |
| 3 | Arsenal | 22 | 16 | 2 | 4 | 53 | 20 | +33 | 50 | Qualification for the Champions League first round |
| 4 | Liverpool | 22 | 12 | 5 | 5 | 36 | 28 | +8 | 41 | |
| 5 | Manchester United | 22 | 10 | 5 | 7 | 42 | 32 | +10 | 35 | |

Source: Women's Super League Table
Rules for classification: 1) Points; 2) Goal difference; 3) Number of goals scored.
(C) Champions

=== FA Cup ===
As a member of the first tier, Manchester City entered the FA Cup in the fourth round proper.

| 14 January 2024 Fourth round | Durham | 0–4 | Manchester City | Durham |
| 12:30 | | Report | Coombs 7'; Roord 38', 69'; Fowler 87' | Stadium: Maiden Castle; Attendance: 2,381; Referee: Elizabeth Simms |

| 11 February 2024 Fifth round | Arsenal | 0–1 | Manchester City | Borehamwood |
| 12:30 | Wubben-Moy (yellow card) 90+3'; Mead (yellow card) 90+6' | Report | Aleixandri 74'; Casparij (yellow card) 90+3'; Kelly (yellow card) 90+4' | Stadium: Meadow Park; Attendance: 3,496; Referee: Stacey Pearson |

| 10 March 2024 Quarter-final | Tottenham Hotspur | 1–1 (a.e.t.) (4–3 p) | Manchester City | Leyton |
| 15:00 | Bizet (yellow card) 20'; Graham (yellow card) 66'; England 90+6' | Report | Fowler 6'; Ouahabi (yellow card) 55'; Greenwood (yellow card) 78'; Hemp (yellow card) 98' | Stadium: Brisbane Road; Attendance: 1,314; Referee: Kirsty Dowle |
| | Penalties |
| | England (penalty scored); Ayane (penalty missed); Nildén (penalty scored); Wang (penalty scored); James-Turner (penalty scored) | | (penalty missed) Greenwood; (penalty missed) Kelly; (penalty scored) Hasegawa; (penalty scored) Angeldahl; (penalty scored) Fowler |

=== League Cup ===
Group stage

| 11 October 2023 Group stage | Everton | 1–2 | Manchester City | Liverpool |
| 19:00 | Duggan 90+3' | Report | Park 21'; Coombs (yellow card) 46'; Shaw 47' | Stadium: Walton Hall Park; Attendance: 1,105; Referee: Megan Wilson |

| 8 November 2023 Group stage | Liverpool | 3–4 | Manchester City | Birkenhead |
| 19:00 | Bonner 45'; Flint 47'; Enderby 90+6' | Report | Angeldahl 33'; Park 48'; Kelly 69', 81' | Stadium: Prenton Park; Attendance: 1,045; Referee: Elizabeth Simms |

| 22 November 2023 Group stage | Manchester City | 2–2 (3–4 p) | Leicester City | Manchester |
| 19:00 | Castellanos 49'; Fowler (yellow card) 51'; Coombs 70' | Report | Palmer (yellow card) 24'; Cayman 41', (yellow card) 60'; Howard 44'; Green (yellow card) 76' | Stadium: Academy Stadium; Attendance: 1,358; Referee: James Bell |
| | Penalties |
| | Greenwood (penalty scored); Fowler (penalty missed); Castellanos (penalty missed); Hasegawa (penalty scored); Roord (penalty scored); Houghton (penalty missed) | | (penalty scored) Rantala; (penalty missed) Petermann; (penalty scored) Whelan; (penalty missed) Cayman; (penalty scored) Cain; (penalty scored) Howard |

| 24 January 2024 Group stage | Manchester City | 2–1 | Manchester United | Manchester |
| 19:00 | Greenwood (yellow card) 42'; Kelly 47'; Hemp 70' | Report | Le Tissier (yellow card) 20'; Guerrero (yellow card) 45+9'; Parris 90+5' | Stadium: Academy Stadium; Attendance: 4,818; Referee: Lauren Impey |

| Pos | Team | Pld | W | PW | PL | L | GF | GA | GD | Pts | Qualification | MCI | MUN | LEI | LIV | EVE |
|---|---|---|---|---|---|---|---|---|---|---|---|---|---|---|---|---|
| 1 | Manchester City (Q) | 4 | 3 | 0 | 1 | 0 | 10 | 7 | +3 | 10 | Advanced to knock-out stage | — | 2–1 | 2–2 | – | – |
| 2 | Manchester United | 4 | 3 | 0 | 0 | 1 | 12 | 3 | +9 | 9 | Possible knock-out stage based on ranking | – | — | 3–1 | – | 7–0 |
| 3 | Leicester City | 4 | 2 | 1 | 0 | 1 | 10 | 7 | +3 | 8 | | – | – | — | 2–1 | 5–1 |
| 4 | Liverpool | 4 | 1 | 0 | 0 | 3 | 6 | 8 | −2 | 3 | | 3–4 | 0–1 | – | — | – |
| 5 | Everton | 4 | 0 | 0 | 0 | 4 | 3 | 16 | −13 | 0 | | 1–2 | – | – | 1–2 | — |

Source: FA Women's League Cup
Rules for classification: 1) Points; 2) Goal difference; 3) Number of goals scored; 4) Number of wins; 5) Head-to-head record
(Q) Qualified to the phase indicated

Knockout stage

| 7 February 2024 Quarter-final | Tottenham Hotspur | 0–1 | Manchester City | Leyton |
| 19:30 | | Report | Hasegawa 34' | Stadium: Brisbane Road; Attendance: 731; Referee: Amy Fearns |

| 7 March 2024 Semi-final | Manchester City | 0–1 | Chelsea | Manchester |
| 19:15 | Kelly (yellow card) 56' | Report | James 8', (yellow card) 90+3' | Stadium: Academy Stadium; Attendance: 3,066; Referee: Andrew Kitchen |

== Squad information ==
=== Playing statistics ===
As of match played 18 May 2024

Starting appearances are listed first, followed by substitute appearances after the + symbol where applicable.

| No. | Pos | Nat | Player | Total | | WSL | | FA Cup | | League Cup | |
| No. | Pos | Nat | Player | Apps | Goals | Apps | Goals | Apps | Goals | Apps | Goals |
|---|---|---|---|---|---|---|---|---|---|---|---|
| 1 | GK | (England) ENG | Ellie Roebuck | 0 | 0 | 0 | 0 | 0 | 0 | 0 | 0 |
| 3 | DF | (England) ENG | Demi Stokes | 5 | 0 | 0+4 | 0 | 0 | 0 | 0+1 | 0 |
| 4 | DF | (Spain) ESP | Laia Aleixandri | 29 | 2 | 21 | 1 | 3 | 1 | 3+2 | 0 |
| 5 | DF | (England) ENG | Alex Greenwood | 27 | 1 | 20 | 1 | 3 | 0 | 3+1 | 0 |
| 6 | DF | (England) ENG | Steph Houghton | 9 | 0 | 0+4 | 0 | 0+1 | 0 | 3+1 | 0 |
| 7 | MF | (England) ENG | Laura Coombs | 26 | 5 | 14+3 | 3 | 2+1 | 1 | 5+1 | 1 |
| 8 | FW | (Australia) AUS | Mary Fowler | 30 | 6 | 13+8 | 4 | 1+2 | 2 | 2+4 | 0 |
| 9 | FW | (England) ENG | Chloe Kelly | 30 | 8 | 18+3 | 5 | 2+1 | 0 | 4+2 | 3 |
| 11 | FW | (England) ENG | Lauren Hemp | 29 | 12 | 19+2 | 11 | 3 | 0 | 4+1 | 1 |
| 12 | MF | (Sweden) SWE | Filippa Angeldahl | 20 | 1 | 8+5 | 0 | 1+1 | 0 | 2+3 | 1 |
| 14 | DF | (England) ENG | Esme Morgan | 15 | 0 | 5+4 | 0 | 0+2 | 0 | 3+1 | 0 |
| 15 | DF | (Spain) ESP | Leila Ouahabi | 23 | 1 | 16+1 | 1 | 3 | 0 | 3 | 0 |
| 16 | FW | (England) ENG | Jess Park | 27 | 6 | 9+9 | 4 | 2+1 | 0 | 5+1 | 2 |
| 17 | FW | (England) ENG | Poppy Pritchard | 0 | 0 | 0 | 0 | 0 | 0 | 0 | 0 |
| 18 | DF | (Netherlands) NED | Kerstin Casparij | 26 | 0 | 11+7 | 0 | 3 | 0 | 5 | 0 |
| 19 | MF | (England) ENG | Laura Blindkilde | 6 | 1 | 0+6 | 1 | 0 | 0 | 0 | 0 |
| 20 | MF | (Netherlands) NED | Jill Roord | 16 | 8 | 11 | 6 | 1 | 2 | 1+3 | 0 |
| 21 | FW | (Jamaica) JAM | Khadija Shaw | 25 | 22 | 17+1 | 21 | 3 | 0 | 4 | 1 |
| 22 | GK | (Scotland) SCO | Sandy MacIver | 2 | 0 | 0 | 0 | 0 | 0 | 2 | 0 |
| 25 | MF | (Japan) JPN | Yui Hasegawa | 30 | 1 | 22 | 0 | 3 | 0 | 3+2 | 1 |
| 26 | DF | (Republic of Ireland) IRL | Tara O'Hanlon | 0 | 0 | 0 | 0 | 0 | 0 | 0 | 0 |
| 30 | MF | (England) ENG | Ruby Mace | 9 | 0 | 0+5 | 0 | 0+1 | 0 | 3 | 0 |
| 33 | DF | (Australia) AUS | Alanna Kennedy | 20 | 0 | 14+3 | 0 | 0+1 | 0 | 1+1 | 0 |
| 35 | GK | (England) ENG | Khiara Keating | 29 | 0 | 22 | 0 | 3 | 0 | 4 | 0 |
| 40 | GK | (England) ENG | Katie Startup | 0 | 0 | 0 | 0 | 0 | 0 | 0 | 0 |
Players who appeared for the club but left during the season:
| 10 | FW | (Venezuela) VEN | Deyna Castellanos | 8 | 1 | 1+4 | 0 | 0 | 0 | 3 | 1 |
| 41 | MF | (Norway) NOR | Julie Blakstad | 7 | 0 | 1+3 | 0 | 0 | 0 | 3 | 0 |

== Transfers and loans ==
=== Transfers in ===
| Date | Position | No. | Player | From club |
|---|---|---|---|---|
| 6 July 2023 | MF | 20 | (Netherlands) Jill Roord | (Germany) VfL Wolfsburg |
| 31 January 2024 | FW | 17 | (England) Poppy Pritchard | (England) Durham |
| 31 January 2024 | DF | 26 | (Republic of Ireland) Tara O'Hanlon | (Republic of Ireland) Peamount United |
| 31 January 2024 | MF | 19 | (England) Laura Blindkilde | (England) Aston Villa |

=== Loans in ===
| Start date | End date | Position | No. | Player | From club |
|---|---|---|---|---|---|
| 14 April 2024 | 30 June 2024 | GK | 40 | (England) Katie Startup (Note: Emergency goalkeeper loan) | (England) Brighton & Hove Albion |

=== Transfers out ===
| Date | Position | No. | Player | To club |
|---|---|---|---|---|
| 28 May 2023 | FW | 13 | (Australia) Hayley Raso | (Spain) Real Madrid |
| 16 August 2023 | DF | | (Wales) Maria Francis-Jones | (England) Burnley |
| 20 January 2024 | MF | 41 | (Norway) Julie Blakstad | (Sweden) Hammarby IF |
| 26 January 2024 | FW | 10 | (Venezuela) Deyna Castellanos | (United States) Bay FC |

=== Loans out ===
| Start date | End date | Position | No. | Player | To club |
|---|---|---|---|---|---|
| 3 September 2023 | 30 June 2024 | MF | 42 | (England) Jemima Dahou (Note: Dual registration) | (England) Blackburn Rovers |
| 29 September 2023 | 30 June 2024 | MF | 36 | (England) Annie Hutchings | (England) Blackburn Rovers |
| 6 January 2024 | 30 June 2024 | FW | | (England) Ginny Lackey | (England) Burnley |
| 9 February 2024 | 30 June 2024 | MF | 39 | (England) Emma Siddall | (England) Burnley |
