= 2020–21 Manchester City W.F.C. season =

Manchester City Women
2020–21 season
- Chairman: Khaldoon Mubarak
- Manager: Gareth Taylor
- Stadium: Academy Stadium
- FA WSL: 2nd
- FA Cup: Semi-finals
- League Cup: Quarter-finals
- Community Shield: Runners-up
- Champions League: Quarter-finals
- Top goalscorer: League: Chloe Kelly and Ellen White (10); All: Chloe Kelly and Ellen White (15)
Home colours	Away colours	Third colours

The 2020–21 season was Manchester City Women's Football Club's 33rd season of competitive football and their eighth season in the FA Women's Super League, the highest level of English women's football.

Gareth Taylor was appointed manager ahead of the new season on 28 May 2020, taking over from Alan Mahon who had been put in charge on an interim basis following the departure of Nick Cushing during the previous campaign.

== Pre-season ==
9 August 2020 Friendly	Manchester City	5–0	Coventry United	Manchester
	Bonner; Hemp; Stanway; White; Kelly	Report		Stadium: Academy Stadium; Attendance: Behind-closed-doors

12 August 2020 Friendly	Manchester City	6–0	Sheffield United	Manchester
	Kelly x2; White x2; Walsh; Little (o.g.)	Report		Stadium: Academy Stadium; Attendance: Behind-closed-doors

16 August 2020 Friendly	Aston Villa	–	Manchester City	Bodymoor Heath
		Report		Stadium: Bodymoor Heath Training Ground; Attendance: Behind-closed-doors
Note: No official scoreline released

23 August 2020 Friendly	Manchester City	4–1	Everton	Manchester
	Bonner; Houghton; Hemp; Mewis	Report	Magill	Stadium: Academy Stadium; Attendance: Behind-closed-doors

== Competitions ==
=== Community Shield ===
In August 2020, the FA announced the return of the Women's FA Community Shield for the first time since 2008. The tie was contested between 2019–20 FA WSL winners Chelsea and Manchester City who qualified as reigning 2019 FA Cup winners due to the unfinished nature of the 2019–20 Women's FA Cup. The match was part of a Wembley double-header on the same day as the men's equivalent and played behind closed doors.

29 August 2020	Chelsea	2–0	Manchester City	London
12:30	Bright 66'; Cuthbert 90+1'	Report	Scott (yellow card) 19' (yellow-red card) 62'	Stadium: Wembley Stadium; Attendance: Behind-closed-doors; Referee: Rebecca Welch

=== Women's Super League ===
==== League table ====
Pos	Team	Pld	W	D	L	GF	GA	GD	Pts	Qualification or relegation
1	Chelsea (C)	22	18	3	1	69	10	+59	57	Qualification for the Champions League group stage
2	Manchester City	22	17	4	1	65	13	+52	55	Qualification for the Champions League second round
3	Arsenal	22	15	3	4	63	15	+48	48	Qualification for the Champions League first round
4	Manchester United	22	15	2	5	44	20	+24	47	
5	Everton	22	9	5	8	39	30	+9	32	

Source: FA WSL
Rules for classification: 1) Points; 2) Goal difference; 3) Number of goals scored.
(C) Champions

==== Results summary ====
Overall								Home						Away					
Pld	W	D	L	GF	GA	GD	Pts	W	D	L	GF	GA	GD	W	D	L	GF	GA	GD
22	17	4	1	65	13	+52	55	9	2	0	36	5	+31	8	2	1	29	8	+21

Last updated: 9 May 2021.
Source: FA WSL

==== Results by matchday ====
Round	1	2	3	4	5	6	7	8	9	10	11	12	13	14	15	16	17	18	19	20	21	22
Ground	A	H	H	A	A	H	A	A	H	H	A	H	A	H	A	H	A	H	A	H	H	A
Result	W	D	W	L	D	W	D	W	W	W	W	W	W	W	W	W	W	W	W	D	W	W
Position	4	6	5	5	5	5	5	4	4	4	3	3	3	2	2	2	2	2	2	2	2	2

A = Away; H = Home; W = Win; D = Draw; L = Loss

==== Results ====
5 September 2020 1	Aston Villa	0–2	Manchester City	Aston
14:30		Report	Stanway 6', 21'	Stadium: Villa Park; Attendance: Behind-closed-doors; Referee: Abigail Byrne

13 September 2020 2	Manchester City	0–0	Brighton & Hove Albion	Manchester
14:00		Report	Bowman (yellow card) 38'	Stadium: Academy Stadium; Attendance: Behind-closed-doors; Referee: Helen Conley

4 October 2020 3	Manchester City	4–1	Tottenham Hotspur	Manchester
12:30	Kelly 33', 51' (pen.); Greenwood (yellow card) 48'; Mewis 53'; White 68'	Report	Green (yellow card) 43'; Dean (yellow card) 44'; Harrop (yellow card) 63'; Filbey 80'	Stadium: Academy Stadium; Attendance: Behind-closed-doors; Referee: Stacey Pearson

11 October 2020 4	Chelsea	3–1	Manchester City	Kingston upon Thames
14:30	Bright (yellow card) 33'; Mjelde 36' (pen.), (yellow card) 88'; Kerr 57'; Kirby 79'	Report	White (yellow card) 36'; Mewis (yellow card) 45+3'; Kelly 73' (pen.)	Stadium: Kingsmeadow; Attendance: Behind-closed-doors; Referee: Rebecca Welch

18 October 2020 5	Reading	1–1	Manchester City	Reading
14:00	Eikeland 3'; Mitchell (yellow card) 51'	Report	Mewis 56'	Stadium: Madejski Stadium; Attendance: Behind-closed-doors; Referee: Savvas Yianni

7 November 2020 6	Manchester City	8–1	Bristol City	Manchester
15:00	Baggaley 9' (o.g.); Coombs 39'; Walsh 42'; Bronze 43'; Stanway 48'; White 58', 85'; Beckie 81'	Report	Salmon 11'	Stadium: Academy Stadium; Attendance: Behind-closed-doors; Referee: Cristiana Hattersley

14 November 2020 7	Manchester United	2–2	Manchester City	Leigh
12:30	Press (yellow card) 46'; Heath 54'; Hanson 74'	Report	Kelly 8', (yellow card) 45+4'; Coombs 45+1'	Stadium: Leigh Sports Village; Attendance: Behind-closed-doors; Referee: Amy Fearn

6 December 2020 8	Everton	0–3	Manchester City	Liverpool
14:30	Raso (yellow card) 29'; Clemaron (yellow card) 66'; Sørensen (yellow card) 75'	Report	White 25'; Bonner 26'; Beckie 45+2'	Stadium: Walton Hall Park; Referee: Stacey Pearson

13 December 2020 9	Manchester City	2–1	Arsenal	Manchester
14:30	Mewis 30'; Weir 90+4'	Report	Miedema 3'; Beattie (yellow card) 31'; McCabe (yellow card) 87'; Nobbs (yellow card) 90+2'	Stadium: Academy Stadium; Attendance: Behind-closed-doors; Referee: Emily Heaslip

20 December 2020	Birmingham City	P–P	Manchester City	Solihull
14:00				Stadium: Damson Park
Note: Postponed due to waterlogged pitch

9 January 2021	Manchester City	P–P	West Ham United	Manchester
15:00				Stadium: Academy Stadium
Note: Postponed due to a COVID-19 outbreak at Manchester City

17 January 2021 10	Manchester City	7–0	Aston Villa	Manchester
12:30	Hemp 2', 38'; Scott 17'; Stanway 31'; Haigh 40' (o.g.); White 45'; Kelly 79'	Report		Stadium: Academy Stadium; Attendance: Behind-closed-doors; Referee: Amy Fearn

24 January 2021 11	Brighton & Hove Albion	1–7	Manchester City	Lancing
14:00	Jarrett 69'	Report	Weir 12', 16'; Houghton 41', 61'; White 58'; Kelly 73'; Beckie 77'	Stadium: AMEX Elite Football Performance Centre; Attendance: Behind-closed-doors; Referee: Lisa Benn

31 January 2021 12	Manchester City	4–0	West Ham United	Manchester
14:00	Weir 9'; Stanway 39'; White 64'; Lavelle 71'	Report		Stadium: Academy Stadium; Attendance: Behind-closed-doors; Referee: Elizabeth Simms
Note: Rescheduled from 9 January 2021 following COVID-19 outbreak at Manchester City

7 February 2021 13	Arsenal	1–2	Manchester City	Borehamwood
14:30	Foord 57'	Report	White 24'; Bronze (yellow card) 71'; Hemp 79'	Stadium: Meadow Park; Attendance: Behind-closed-doors; Referee: Kirsty Dowle

12 February 2021 14	Manchester City	3–0	Manchester United	Manchester
19:00	Bronze 23'; Greenwood (yellow card) 59'; Hemp 71'; Weir 84'	Report	Ladd (yellow card) 28'; Sigsworth (yellow card) 90+4'	Stadium: Academy Stadium; Attendance: Behind-closed-doors; Referee: Abigail Byrne

28 February 2021 15	Birmingham City	0–4	Manchester City	Burton upon Trent
14:00	Littlejohn (yellow card) 63'	Report	Mewis 40', 52'; Hemp 53'; Weir 66'	Stadium: St George's Park; Attendance: Behind-closed-doors; Referee: Helen Conley
Note: Rescheduled from 20 December 2020 due to waterlogged pitch. Venue changed by WSL Executive Operations Committee due to repeated failure to fulfill fixtures.

7 March 2021 16	Manchester City	1–0	Everton	Manchester
14:00	Walsh 81'	Report	Clemaron (yellow card) 80'; Pattinson (yellow card) 90'	Stadium: Academy Stadium; Attendance: Behind-closed-doors; Referee: Sarah Garratt

17 March 2021 17	Bristol City	0–3	Manchester City	Bath
19:30		Report	Weir 12'; White 30'; Stanway (yellow card) 76'; Mewis 89'	Stadium: Twerton Park; Attendance: Behind-closed-doors; Referee: Scott Jackson

27 March 2021 18	Manchester City	1–0	Reading	Manchester
17:30	Bronze (yellow card) 45'; Kelly 87'	Report	Harding (yellow card) 40'; Woodham (yellow card) 47'; Eikeland (yellow card) 78'; Cooper (yellow card) 86'	Stadium: Academy Stadium; Attendance: Behind-closed-doors; Referee: Stacey Pearson

4 April 2021 19	Tottenham Hotspur	0–3	Manchester City	Canons Park
14:00		Report	Spencer 5' (o.g.); Beckie 38'; Weir 61'	Stadium: The Hive; Attendance: Behind-closed-doors; Referee: Amy Fearn

21 April 2021 20	Manchester City	2–2	Chelsea	Manchester
18:00	Kelly 29'; Hemp 74'; Greenwood (yellow card) 77'	Report	Kerr 25'; Harder 34' (pen.)	Stadium: Academy Stadium; Attendance: Behind-closed-doors; Referee: Rebecca Welch

2 May 2021 21	Manchester City	4–0	Birmingham City	Manchester
15:00	Kelly 10', 23'; Morgan 85'; Mewis 90+4'	Report		Stadium: Academy Stadium; Attendance: Behind-closed-doors; Referee: Emily Heaslip

9 May 2021 22	West Ham United	0–1	Manchester City	Dagenham
14:30	Cissoko (yellow card) 83'	Report	White 75'	Stadium: Victoria Road; Attendance: Behind-closed-doors; Referee: Kirsty Dowle

=== FA Cup ===
As a member of the top two tiers, Manchester City will enter FA Cup in the fourth round proper. Originally scheduled to take place on 31 January 2021, it was delayed due to COVID-19 restrictions. The competition recommenced with the remaining first round fixture on 31 March with the fourth round scheduled for the weekend 17–18 April 2021. Due to the delay, the competition only reached the fifth round before the end of the season. It resumed at the quarter-final stage the following season on 29 September 2021.

17 April 2021 Fourth round	Manchester City	8–0	Aston Villa	Manchester
13:00	Kelly 16', 41', 84'; White 34'; Beckie 50'; Stanway 59'; Lavelle 72'; Mewis 90'	Report		Stadium: Academy Stadium; Attendance: Behind-closed-doors

16 May 2021 Fifth round	Manchester City	5–1	West Ham United	Manchester
14:00	White 15'; Beckie 39'; Lavelle 74'; Mewis 90+2'; Hemp 90+4'	Report	Denton 17'	Stadium: Academy Stadium; Attendance: Behind-closed-doors

29 September 2021 Quarter-final	Manchester City	6–0	Leicester City	Manchester
19:00	Shaw 46', 61', 85'; Losada 53'; Greenwood 71' (pen.); Angeldal 88'	Report		Stadium: Academy Stadium; Referee: Lucy May

31 October 2021 Semi-final	Manchester City	0–3	Chelsea	Manchester
12:45	Stokes (yellow card) 18'	Report	Cuthbert 23'; Leupolz 28'; England 89'	Stadium: Academy Stadium; Referee: Rebecca Welch

=== League Cup ===
Group stage

7 October 2020 Group stage	Manchester City	3–1	Everton	Manchester
19:00	Lavelle 51'; Walsh (yellow card) 60'; Kelly 76'; Stokes (yellow card) 89'; Park 90+2'	Report	Turner 20'	Stadium: Academy Stadium; Attendance: Behind-closed-doors; Referee: Simon Mather

4 November 2020 Group stage	Liverpool	0–3	Manchester City	Birkenhead
14:00		Report	Coombs 42'; Lavelle 52'; Park 90+2'	Stadium: Prenton Park; Attendance: Behind-closed-doors; Referee: Sarah Garratt

19 November 2020 Group stage	Manchester United	0–0 (4–3 p)	Manchester City	Leigh
19:00		Report		Stadium: Leigh Sports Village; Attendance: Behind-closed-doors; Referee: Helen Conley
	Penalties
	Toone (penalty scored); Groenen (penalty scored); M. Turner (penalty scored); Ladd (penalty scored)		(penalty scored) Mewis; (penalty missed) Coombs; (penalty scored) Beckie; (penalty scored) Stanway; (penalty missed) Greenwood

Pos	Team	Pld	W	WPEN	LPEN	L	GF	GA	GD	Pts	Qualification	MCI	EVE	LIV	MNU
1	Manchester City	3	2	0	1	0	6	1	+5	7	Advanced to knock-out stage	—	3–1	—	—
2	Everton	3	2	0	0	1	3	3	0	6	Possible knock-out stage based on ranking	—	—	1–0	1–0
3	Liverpool	3	1	0	0	2	3	5	−2	3		0–3	—	—	3–1
4	Manchester United	3	0	1	0	2	1	4	−3	2		0–0	—	—	—

Source: thefa.com
Rules for classification: 1) Points; 2) Goal difference; 3) Number of goals scored; 4) Number of wins; 5) Head-to-head record

Knockout stage

20 January 2021 Quarter-finals	Manchester City	2–4 (a.e.t.)	Chelsea	Manchester
17:30	Kelly 52'; Hemp 85'	Report	Leupolz 43'; Charles 89'; Reiten 95'; Ingle 105'	Stadium: Academy Stadium; Attendance: Behind-closed-doors; Referee: Richie Watkins
Note: Rescheduled from 13 January 2021 following a COVID-19 outbreak at Manchester City

=== Champions League ===
Round of 32

9 December 2020 R32 first leg	Kopparbergs/Göteborg (Sweden)	1–2	Manchester City	Gothenburg, Sweden
16:00 CET	Bøe Risa 3'; Csiki (yellow card) 53'; Roddar (yellow card) 74'	Report	Stanway 41', (yellow card) 42'; Mewis 76'; Roebuck (yellow card) 90+3'	Stadium: Valhalla IP; Attendance: Behind-closed-doors; Referee: Jana Adámková

16 December 2020 R32 second leg	Manchester City	3–0 (5–1 agg.)	(Sweden) Kopparbergs/Göteborg	Manchester, England
15:00	Hemp 37'; Stanway 65', 68'	Report	Wijk (yellow card) 49'	Stadium: Academy Stadium; Attendance: Behind-closed-doors; Referee: Katalin Kulcsár

Round of 16

3 March 2021 R16 first leg	Manchester City	3–0	(Italy) Fiorentina	Manchester, England
16:45	Hemp 2'; White 4'; Dahlkemper (yellow card) 41'; Mewis 89'	Report	Neto (yellow card) 70'	Stadium: Academy Stadium; Attendance: Behind-closed-doors; Referee: Monika Mularczyk

11 March 2021 R16 second leg	Fiorentina (Italy)	0–5 (0–8 agg.)	Manchester City	Florence, Italy
14:00 CET		Report	White 8', 32'; Weir 18' (pen.); Mewis 60', 78'	Stadium: Stadio Artemio Franchi; Attendance: Behind-closed-doors; Referee: Esther Staubli

Quarter-finals

24 March 2021 QF first leg	Barcelona (Spain)	3–0	Manchester City	Monza, Italy
12:30 CET	Oshoala 35'; Caldentey 53' (pen.); Hermoso 86'; Guijarro (yellow card) 86'	Report	Weir (yellow card) 14'; Stokes (yellow card) 52'	Stadium: Stadio Brianteo; Attendance: Behind-closed-doors; Referee: Tess Olofsson
Note: Game moved from Spain to Italy due to travel restrictions

31 March 2021 QF second leg	Manchester City	2–1 (2–4 agg.)	(Spain) Barcelona	Manchester, England
16:00	Beckie 20'; Kelly (yellow card) 40'; Mewis 68' (pen.)	Report	Guijarro (yellow card) 29'; Oshoala 59'	Stadium: Academy Stadium; Attendance: Behind-closed-doors; Referee: Monika Mularczyk

== Squad information ==
=== Playing statistics ===
As of 31 October 2021

Starting appearances are listed first, followed by substitute appearances after the + symbol where applicable.

No.	Pos	Nat	Player	Total		FA WSL		FA Cup		League Cup		Champions League		Community Shield	
No.	Pos	Nat	Player	Apps	Goals	Apps	Goals	Apps	Goals	Apps	Goals	Apps	Goals	Apps	Goals
2	DF	(England) ENG	Aoife Mannion	4	0	1+2	0	0	0	0	0	0+1	0	0	0
3	DF	(England) ENG	Demi Stokes	17	0	8+2	0	2	0	1+1	0	1+1	0	1	0
5	DF	(Republic of Ireland) IRL	Megan Campbell	1	0	0	0	0	0	0	0	0	0	1	0
6	DF	(England) ENG	Steph Houghton	23	2	16	2	0	0	2+1	0	3	0	1	0
7	MF	(England) ENG	Laura Coombs	25	3	6+7	2	3+1	0	1+2	1	1+4	0	0	0
9	FW	(England) ENG	Chloe Kelly	31	15	20+1	10	1	3	2	2	4+2	0	1	0
10	FW	(England) ENG	Georgia Stanway	35	9	16+5	5	2+1	1	4	0	3+3	3	1	0
11	FW	(Canada) CAN	Janine Beckie	27	7	6+8	4	3+1	2	2+2	0	4	1	0+1	0
13	DF	(United States) USA	Abby Dahlkemper	13	0	7+1	0	1	0	0	0	4	0	0	0
14	DF	(England) ENG	Esme Morgan	24	1	10+2	1	1+1	0	4	0	4+1	0	1	0
15	FW	(England) ENG	Lauren Hemp	25	10	13+2	6	4	1	1	1	4	2	1	0
16	MF	(England) ENG	Jess Park	17	2	1+8	0	1+1	0	3+1	2	0+2	0	0	0
18	FW	(England) ENG	Ellen White	36	15	19+3	10	3+1	2	1+2	0	5+1	3	0+1	0
19	FW	(Scotland) SCO	Caroline Weir	33	9	17+3	8	4	0	1+1	0	5+1	1	1	0
20	DF	(England) ENG	Lucy Bronze	28	2	18	2	2	0	3	0	5	0	0	0
21	MF	(United States) USA	Rose Lavelle	24	5	3+13	1	0+2	2	1+1	2	2+2	0	0	0
22	MF	(United States) USA	Sam Mewis	29	14	14+3	7	0+2	2	1+2	0	4+2	5	0+1	0
24	MF	(England) ENG	Keira Walsh	32	2	20	2	3	0	3	0	5	0	1	0
26	GK	(England) ENG	Ellie Roebuck	27	0	20	0	1	0	0	0	5	0	1	0
27	DF	(England) ENG	Alex Greenwood	32	1	17+1	0	4	1	4	0	6	0	0	0
34	GK	(France) FRA	Karima Benameur Taieb	5	0	1	0	3	0	0	0	1	0	0	0
35	GK	(England) ENG	Khiara Keating	0	0	0	0	0	0	0	0	0	0	0	0
36	DF	(England) ENG	Alicia Window	1	0	0+1	0	0	0	0	0	0	0	0	0
39	MF	(England) ENG	Millie Davies	5	0	0+4	0	0	0	0	0	0+1	0	0	0
Players away from the club on loan:
1	GK	(England) ENG	Karen Bardsley	5	0	1	0	0	0	4	0	0	0	0	0
8	MF	(England) ENG	Jill Scott	15	1	2+5	1	2	0	4	0	0+1	0	1	0
Joined during 2021–22 season but competed in the postponed 2020–21 FA Cup:
17	MF	(Spain) ESP	Vicky Losada	2	1	0	0	1+1	1	0	0	0	0	0	0
12	MF	(Sweden) SWE	Filippa Angeldal	1	1	0	0	1	1	0	0	0	0	0	0
21	FW	(Jamaica) JAM	Khadija Shaw	2	3	0	0	2	3	0	0	0	0	0	0
Players who appeared for the club but left during the season:
4	DF	(England) ENG	Gemma Bonner	9	1	6	1	0	0	2	0	0+1	0	0	0

== Transfers and loans ==
=== Transfers in ===
Date	Position	No.	Player	From club
3 July 2020	FW	9	(England) Chloe Kelly	(England) Everton
10 August 2020	MF	22	(United States) Sam Mewis	(United States) North Carolina Courage
18 August 2020	MF	21	(United States) Rose Lavelle	(United States) OL Reign
8 September 2020	DF	20	(England) Lucy Bronze	(France) Lyon
9 September 2020	DF	27	(England) Alex Greenwood	(France) Lyon
16 January 2021	DF	13	(United States) Abby Dahlkemper	(United States) North Carolina Courage

=== Transfers out ===
Date	Position	No.	Player	To club
1 July 2020	FW	9	(Germany) Pauline Bremer	(Germany) Wolfsburg
1 July 2020	FW	25	(Belgium) Tessa Wullaert	(Belgium) Anderlecht
4 August 2020	DF	35	(Portugal) Matilde Fidalgo	(Portugal) Benfica
19 August 2020	FW	28	(England) Emma Bissell	(England) Bristol City
23 April 2021	DF	4	(England) Gemma Bonner	(United States) Racing Louisville

=== Loans out ===
Start date	End date	Position	No.	Player	To club
24 July 2020	30 June 2021	FW	17	(South Korea) Lee Geum-min	(England) Brighton & Hove Albion
5 October 2020	30 June 2021	MF	12	(Republic of Ireland) Tyler Toland	(Scotland) Glasgow City
21 January 2021	30 June 2021	MF	8	(England) Jill Scott	(England) Everton
23 February 2021	30 June 2021	GK	1	(England) Karen Bardsley	(United States) OL Reign
