= 2021–22 Manchester City W.F.C. season =

Manchester City Women
2021–22 season
- Chairman: Khaldoon Mubarak
- Manager: Gareth Taylor
- Stadium: Academy Stadium
- FA WSL: 3rd
- FA Cup: Runners-up
- League Cup: Winners
- UEFA Champions League: Second qualifying round
- Top goalscorer: League: Lauren Hemp (10 goals); All: Lauren Hemp (21 goals)
- Highest home attendance: 5,317 (vs. Manchester United, 13 February)
- Lowest home attendance: 1,098 (vs. Aston Villa, 20 November)
- Average home league attendance: 1,917
| Home colours | Away colours | Third colours |

The 2021–22 season was Manchester City Women's Football Club's 34th season of competitive football and their ninth season in the FA Women's Super League, the highest level of English women's football.

== Competitions ==
=== Women's Super League ===
==== League table ====
| Pos | Team | Pld | W | D | L | GF | GA | GD | Pts | Qualification or relegation |
|---|---|---|---|---|---|---|---|---|---|---|
| 1 | Chelsea (C) | 22 | 18 | 2 | 2 | 62 | 11 | +51 | 56 | Qualification for the Champions League group stage |
| 2 | Arsenal | 22 | 17 | 4 | 1 | 65 | 10 | +55 | 55 | Qualification for the Champions League second round |
| 3 | Manchester City | 22 | 15 | 2 | 5 | 60 | 22 | +38 | 47 | Qualification for the Champions League first round |
| 4 | Manchester United | 22 | 12 | 6 | 4 | 45 | 22 | +23 | 42 | |
| 5 | Tottenham Hotspur | 22 | 9 | 5 | 8 | 24 | 23 | +1 | 32 | |

Source: FA WSL
Rules for classification: 1) Points; 2) Goal difference; 3) Number of goals scored.
(C) Champions

==== Results summary ====
| Overall | | | | | | | | Home | | | | | | Away | | | | | |
| Pld | W | D | L | GF | GA | GD | Pts | W | D | L | GF | GA | GD | W | D | L | GF | GA | GD |
|---|---|---|---|---|---|---|---|---|---|---|---|---|---|---|---|---|---|---|---|
| 22 | 15 | 2 | 5 | 60 | 22 | +38 | 47 | 7 | 1 | 3 | 31 | 11 | +20 | 8 | 1 | 2 | 29 | 11 | +18 |

Last updated: 8 May 2022.
Source: FA WSL

==== Results by matchday ====
| Round | 1 | 2 | 3 | 4 | 5 | 6 | 7 | 8 | 9 | 10 | 11 | 12 | 13 | 14 | 15 | 16 | 17 | 18 | 19 | 20 | 21 | 22 |
|---|---|---|---|---|---|---|---|---|---|---|---|---|---|---|---|---|---|---|---|---|---|---|
| Ground | A | H | A | H | A | A | H | H | A | A | A | H | A | H | A | H | H | A | H | H | H | A |
| Result | W | L | L | L | D | W | L | W | W | W | W | D | L | W | W | W | W | W | W | W | W | W |
| Position | 1 | 7 | 8 | 9 | 9 | 7 | 8 | 7 | 6 | 5 | 5 | 5 | 6 | 5 | 5 | 4 | 4 | 4 | 4 | 4 | 3 | 3 |

A = Away; H = Home; W = Win; D = Draw; L = Loss

==== Matches ====
| 4 September 2021 1 | Everton | 0–4 | Manchester City | Liverpool |
| 13:30 | Björn (yellow card) 90+2' | Report | Losada 26'; Beckie 36'; Shaw 38'; Houghton 67' | Stadium: Goodison Park; Attendance: 5,998; Referee: Kirsty Dowle |

| 12 September 2021 2 | Manchester City | 1–2 | Tottenham Hotspur | Manchester |
| 18:45 | Hemp 6'; Morgan (yellow card) 11' | Report | Williams 61'; Benameur Taieb 86' (o.g.); Neville (yellow card) 90+6' | Stadium: Academy Stadium; Attendance: 1,126; Referee: Abigail Byrne |

| 26 September 2021 3 | Arsenal | 5–0 | Manchester City | Borehamwood |
| 18:45 | Miedema 10'; Little 23', 78' (pen.); McCabe 60'; Maritz (yellow card) 67'; Williamson 90+4' | Report | Stokes (yellow card) 45+3' | Stadium: Meadow Park; Attendance: 2,061; Referee: Elizabeth Simms |

| 3 October 2021 4 | Manchester City | 0–2 | West Ham United | Manchester |
| 14:00 | | Report | Brynjarsdóttir 39'; Cissoko (yellow card) 90+2'; Hasegawa 90+4' | Stadium: Academy Stadium; Attendance: 1,298; Referee: Helen Conley |

| 9 October 2021 5 | Manchester United | 2–2 | Manchester City | Leigh |
| 13:30 | Staniforth 72'; Russo 75' | Report | Stanway (red card) 35'; Shaw 38'; White 79'; Beckie (yellow card) 90+1' | Stadium: Leigh Sports Village; Attendance: 3,797; Referee: Rebecca Welch |

| 7 November 2021 6 | Leicester City | 1–4 | Manchester City | Leicester |
| 14:00 | Sigsworth 1'; O'Brien (yellow card) 45+2' | Report | Weir 24'; Walsh 37'; Hemp 71'; Coombs 83' | Stadium: King Power Stadium; Attendance: 2,464; Referee: Helen Conley |

| 14 November 2021 7 | Manchester City | 0–4 | Chelsea | Manchester |
| 15:00 | Greenwood (yellow card) 74' | Report | Fleming 2'; Kerr 45+4'; Kirby 52'; Eriksson 55' | Stadium: Academy Stadium; Attendance: 3,174; Referee: Rebecca Welch |

| 20 November 2021 8 | Manchester City | 5–0 | Aston Villa | Manchester |
| 11:30 | Weir 48'; Stanway 51'; Raso 77', 81'; Hemp 78' | Report | | Stadium: Academy Stadium; Attendance: 1,098; Referee: Abigail Byrne |

| 12 December 2021 9 | Birmingham City | 2–3 | Manchester City | Birmingham |
| 13:00 | Murray 28' (pen.); Robertson (yellow card) 32'; Quinn 39' | Report | Stanway 34', (yellow card) 72'; Hemp 44'; White (yellow card) 45+3', (goal) 89' | Stadium: St Andrew's; Attendance: 812; Referee: Helen Conley |

| 19 December 2021 | Manchester City | P–P | Reading | Manchester |
| 14:00 | | | | Stadium: Academy Stadium |
Note: Postponed due to a COVID-19 outbreak at Manchester City.

| 9 January 2022 10 | Brighton & Hove Albion | 0–6 | Manchester City | Crawley |
| 12:00 | Carter (yellow card) 29'; Whelan (yellow card) 58' | Report | Williams 48' (o.g.); Hemp 50'; Stanway 51'; Coombs 55'; Raso 73'; Losada 76' | Stadium: Broadfield Stadium; Attendance: 1,445; Referee: Emily Heaslip |

| 15 January 2022 11 | Aston Villa | 0–3 | Manchester City | Walsall |
| 12:30 | | Report | Stanway 5', 75'; Losada 41'; Greenwood (yellow card) 58' | Stadium: Bescot Stadium; Attendance: 483; Referee: Louise Saunders |
Note: Kickoff delayed until 13:00 due to pitch inspection

| 23 January 2022 12 | Manchester City | 1–1 | Arsenal | Manchester |
| 18:45 | Stanway (yellow card) 16'; Hemp (yellow card) 33'; Shaw 65'; Weir (yellow card) 89'; Walsh (yellow card) 90+5' | Report | McCabe (yellow card) 32'; Parris (yellow card) 55'; Miedema (yellow card) 83'; Heath 90+2' | Stadium: Academy Stadium; Attendance: 2,355; Referee: Abigail Byrne |

| 6 February 2022 13 | Chelsea | 1–0 | Manchester City | Kingston upon Thames |
| 12:30 | Reiten 14' | Report | | Stadium: Kingsmeadow; Attendance: 3,329; Referee: Amy Fearn |

| 13 February 2022 14 | Manchester City | 1–0 | Manchester United | Manchester |
| 12:30 | Weir 81' | Report | Caldwell (yellow card) 54' | Stadium: Academy Stadium; Attendance: 5,317; Referee: Kirsty Dowle |

| 6 March 2022 | Manchester City | P–P | Everton | Manchester |
| 14:00 | | | | Stadium: Academy Stadium |
Note: Postponed due to City's involvement in the 2022 FA Women's League Cup Final.

| 13 March 2022 15 | Tottenham Hotspur | 0–1 | Manchester City | Canons Park |
| 12:30 | Neville (yellow card) 70'; Harrop (yellow card) 90+2' | Report | Greenwood (yellow card) 5'; Weir 64'; Roebuck (yellow card) 81' | Stadium: The Hive; Attendance: 1,303; Referee: Emily Heaslip |

| 16 March 2022 16 | Manchester City | 2–0 | Reading | Manchester |
| 19:00 | Stokes 73'; Hemp 84' | Report | Vanhaevermaet (yellow card) 81' | Stadium: Academy Stadium; Attendance: 1,126; Referee: Anthony Backhouse |
Note: Rescheduled from 19 December 2021

| 23 March 2022 17 | Manchester City | 4–0 | Everton | Manchester |
| 19:00 | Magill 25' (o.g.); White 32'; Greenwood 84'; Coombs 85' | Report | George (yellow card) 51'; Turner (yellow card) 88' | Stadium: Academy Stadium; Attendance: 1,119; Referee: Scott Jackson |
Note: Rescheduled from 6 March 2022

| 27 March 2022 | Manchester City | P–P | Birmingham City | Manchester |
| 14:00 | | | | Stadium: Academy Stadium |
Note: Postponed due to a COVID-19 outbreak at Birmingham

| 2 April 2022 18 | West Ham United | 0–2 | Manchester City | Dagenham |
| 11:30 | | Report | Stanway 8'; Shaw 63' | Stadium: Victoria Road; Attendance: 1,475; Referee: Elizabeth Simms |

| 24 April 2022 19 | Manchester City | 4–0 | Leicester City | Manchester |
| 14:00 | Weir 16'; Hemp 43'; Blakstad 45+3'; Greenwood 63' | Report | | Stadium: Academy Stadium; Attendance: 1,895; Referee: Louise Saunders |

| 30 April 2022 20 | Manchester City | 7–2 | Brighton & Hove Albion | Manchester |
| 11:30 | Shaw 3', 12', 57', 61'; Weir 16'; Greenwood 68'; Hemp 69' | Report | Kaagman 21' (pen.); Zigiotti Olme 45'; Simpkins (yellow card) 90+2' | Stadium: Academy Stadium; Attendance: 1,377; Referee: Amy Fearn |

| 4 May 2022 21 | Manchester City | 6–0 | Birmingham City | Manchester |
| 19:00 | Stanway 58', 64'; Hemp 64'; Kennedy 76'; Kelly 83'; Coombs 87' | Report | | Stadium: Academy Stadium; Attendance: 1,207; Referee: Kirsty Dowle |
Note: Rescheduled from 27 March 2022

| 8 May 2022 22 | Reading | 0–4 | Manchester City | Reading |
| 12:00 | Woodham (yellow card) 90'; Primmer (yellow card) 90+2' | Report | Hemp 33'; Shaw 40'; White 85'; Greenwood 90+1' (pen.) | Stadium: Madejski Stadium; Referee: Elizabeth Simms |

=== FA Cup ===
As a member of the first tier, Manchester City entered the FA Cup in the fourth round proper.

| 29 January 2022 Fourth round | Nottingham Forest | 0–8 | Manchester City | West Bridgford |
| 13:00 | | Report | Weir 2'; Shaw 34', 69'; Angeldal 43'; Stanway 50', 71', 90+2'; Hemp 53' | Stadium: City Ground; Attendance: 3,994 |

| 27 February 2022 Fifth round | Manchester United | 1–4 | Manchester City | Leigh |
| 12:30 | Zelem 13'; Batlle (yellow card) 45+2' | Report | Hemp 50'; White (yellow card) 53', (goal) 58'; Weir 60'; Shaw 79'; Stanway (yellow card) 82' | Stadium: Leigh Sports Village; Attendance: 2,335; Referee: Elizabeth Simms |

| 20 March 2022 Quarter-final | Manchester City | 4–0 | Everton | Manchester |
| 12:30 | Hemp 35', 48'; Weir 61'; White 90+2' | Report | | Stadium: Academy Stadium; Referee: Lauren Impey |

| 16 April 2022 Semi-final | West Ham United | 1–4 | Manchester City | Dagenham |
| 12:15 | Evans 42' | Report | White 22'; Kelly 37', (yellow card) 53'; Hemp 66', 90+1' | Stadium: Victoria Road; Attendance: 1,565; Referee: Abigail Byrne |

| 15 May 2022 Final | Chelsea | 3–2 (a.e.t.) | Manchester City | London |
| 14:30 | Kerr 33', 99'; Cuthbert 63'; Carter (yellow card) 81' | Report | Kennedy (yellow card) 31'; Hemp 42'; Bronze (yellow card) 54'; Raso 89' | Stadium: Wembley Stadium; Attendance: 49,094; Referee: Kirsty Dowle |

=== League Cup ===
As a result of failing to progress from the Champions League qualifying rounds, Manchester City entered the FA Women's League Cup at the group stage. With the groups already drawn prior to their elimination, they were placed into the existing group of four in their geographical region.

Group stage

| Pos | Team | Pld | W | WPEN | LPEN | L | GF | GA | GD | Pts | Qualification | MCI | MNU | EVE | LEI | DUR |
|---|---|---|---|---|---|---|---|---|---|---|---|---|---|---|---|---|
| 1 | Manchester City | 4 | 3 | 0 | 0 | 1 | 14 | 3 | +11 | 9 | Advances to knock-out stage | — | — | 5–1 | — | 3–0 |
| 2 | Manchester United | 4 | 2 | 1 | 1 | 0 | 8 | 5 | +3 | 9 | Possible knock-out stage based on ranking | 2–1 | — | — | 2–2 | — |
| 3 | Everton | 4 | 2 | 0 | 0 | 2 | 5 | 8 | −3 | 6 | | — | 0–2 | — | — | 1–0 |
| 4 | Leicester City | 4 | 1 | 1 | 0 | 2 | 5 | 11 | −6 | 5 | | 0–5 | — | 1–3 | — | — |
| 5 | Durham | 4 | 0 | 0 | 1 | 3 | 3 | 8 | −5 | 1 | | — | 2–2 | — | 1–2 | — |

Source: thefa.com
Rules for classification: 1) Points; 2) Goal difference; 3) Number of goals scored; 4) Number of wins; 5) Head-to-head record

| 13 October 2021 Group stage | Manchester City | 5–1 | Everton | Manchester |
| 19:00 | Weir 8'; Shaw 32'; Hemp 74'; Park 79'; White 89' | Report | Clinton 10' | Stadium: Academy Stadium |

| 4 November 2021 Group stage | Manchester City | 3–0 | Durham | Manchester |
| 19:00 | Angeldal 16'; Weir 87'; Beckie 90' | Report | | Stadium: Academy Stadium |

| 17 November 2021 Group stage | Manchester United | 2–1 | Manchester City | Leigh |
| 19:00 | Fuso 30'; Hanson (yellow card) 48'; Thorisdottir (yellow card) 58'; Batlle 82' | Report | Losada 2'; Greenwood (yellow card) 30' | Stadium: Leigh Sports Village |

| 15 December 2021 Group stage | Leicester City | P–P | Manchester City | Burton upon Trent |
| 19:00 | | | | Stadium: Pirelli Stadium |
Note: Postponed due to a COVID-19 outbreak at Manchester City.

| 12 January 2022 Group stage | Leicester City | 0–5 | Manchester City | Burton upon Trent |
| 19:00 | | Report | White 9'; Hemp 15', 34'; Stanway 16', 47' | Stadium: Pirelli Stadium |
Note: Rescheduled from 15 December 2021

Knockout stage

| 19 January 2022 Quarter-final | Manchester City | 3–1 | Bristol City | Manchester |
| 19:00 | Shaw 27', 44'; Losada 62' | Report | Greenwood 16' (o.g.) | Stadium: Academy Stadium; Referee: Simon Mather |

| 3 February 2022 Semi-final | Manchester City | 3–0 | Tottenham Hotspur | Manchester |
| 19:00 | Park 21'; Shaw 27', (yellow card) 45+2'; Hemp 70' | Report | Clemaron (yellow card) 13' | Stadium: Academy Stadium; Attendance: 1,410; Referee: Simon Mather |

| 5 March 2022 Final | Manchester City | 3–1 | Chelsea | Wimbledon |
| 17:15 | Bronze (yellow card) 37'; Weir 49', 69'; White 57' | Report | Kerr 34' | Stadium: Plough Lane; Attendance: 8,004; Referee: Lisa Benn |

=== Champions League ===
Manchester City entered the revised format of the Champions League in the second qualifying round.

Second qualifying round

| 31 August 2021 R2 first leg | Real Madrid (Spain) | 1–1 | Manchester City | Madrid, Spain |
| 21:00 (CET) | Robles 90+2' | Report | Weir 47' | Stadium: Alfredo Di Stéfano Stadium; Referee: Sandra Bastos (Portugal) |

| 8 September 2021 R2 second leg | Manchester City | 0–1 (1–2 agg.) | (Spain) Real Madrid | Manchester, England |
| 19:00 | Morgan (yellow card) 62'; Hemp (yellow card) 89' | Report | Zornoza 44'; Carmona (yellow card) 85' | Stadium: Academy Stadium; Referee: Riem Hussein (Germany) |

== Squad information ==
=== Playing statistics ===
As of 15 May 2022

Starting appearances are listed first, followed by substitute appearances after the + symbol where applicable.

| No. | Pos | Nat | Player | Total | | FA WSL | | FA Cup | | League Cup | | Champions League | |
| No. | Pos | Nat | Player | Apps | Goals | Apps | Goals | Apps | Goals | Apps | Goals | Apps | Goals |
|---|---|---|---|---|---|---|---|---|---|---|---|---|---|
| 1 | GK | (England) ENG | Karen Bardsley | 0 | 0 | 0 | 0 | 0 | 0 | 0 | 0 | 0 | 0 |
| 3 | DF | (England) ENG | Demi Stokes | 33 | 1 | 18+1 | 1 | 5 | 0 | 4+3 | 0 | 2 | 0 |
| 5 | DF | (England) ENG | Alex Greenwood | 36 | 4 | 22 | 4 | 5 | 0 | 6+1 | 0 | 2 | 0 |
| 6 | DF | (England) ENG | Steph Houghton | 9 | 1 | 4+1 | 1 | 0 | 0 | 2 | 0 | 2 | 0 |
| 7 | MF | (England) ENG | Laura Coombs | 27 | 4 | 6+10 | 4 | 2+2 | 0 | 4+1 | 0 | 2 | 0 |
| 8 | MF | (England) ENG | Jill Scott | 11 | 0 | 5+3 | 0 | 0 | 0 | 0+2 | 0 | 0+1 | 0 |
| 9 | FW | (England) ENG | Chloe Kelly | 7 | 2 | 3+2 | 1 | 2 | 1 | 0 | 0 | 0 | 0 |
| 10 | FW | (England) ENG | Georgia Stanway | 33 | 13 | 19+3 | 8 | 2+3 | 3 | 5 | 2 | 0+1 | 0 |
| 12 | MF | (Sweden) SWE | Filippa Angeldal | 23 | 2 | 6+9 | 0 | 2+2 | 1 | 3+1 | 1 | 0 | 0 |
| 13 | FW | (Australia) AUS | Hayley Raso | 22 | 4 | 8+5 | 3 | 0+3 | 1 | 3+1 | 0 | 1+1 | 0 |
| 14 | DF | (England) ENG | Esme Morgan | 4 | 0 | 2 | 0 | 0 | 0 | 0 | 0 | 2 | 0 |
| 15 | FW | (England) ENG | Lauren Hemp | 35 | 21 | 20+2 | 10 | 5 | 7 | 5+1 | 4 | 2 | 0 |
| 16 | FW | (England) ENG | Jess Park | 23 | 2 | 8+5 | 0 | 2+1 | 0 | 4+2 | 2 | 0+1 | 0 |
| 17 | MF | (Spain) ESP | Vicky Losada | 21 | 5 | 6+6 | 3 | 1+2 | 0 | 4 | 2 | 2 | 0 |
| 18 | FW | (England) ENG | Ellen White | 34 | 10 | 13+9 | 4 | 3+1 | 3 | 4+3 | 3 | 0+1 | 0 |
| 19 | MF | (Scotland) SCO | Caroline Weir | 32 | 14 | 17+2 | 6 | 4+1 | 3 | 3+3 | 4 | 2 | 1 |
| 20 | DF | (England) ENG | Lucy Bronze | 22 | 0 | 13 | 0 | 5 | 0 | 4 | 0 | 0 | 0 |
| 21 | FW | (Jamaica) JAM | Khadija Shaw | 27 | 16 | 9+8 | 9 | 2+2 | 3 | 3+1 | 4 | 2 | 0 |
| 24 | MF | (England) ENG | Keira Walsh | 28 | 1 | 18 | 1 | 4 | 0 | 5+1 | 0 | 0 | 0 |
| 26 | GK | (England) ENG | Ellie Roebuck | 17 | 0 | 10 | 0 | 5 | 0 | 2 | 0 | 0 | 0 |
| 30 | MF | (England) ENG | Ruby Mace | 15 | 0 | 2+5 | 0 | 1+1 | 0 | 4+2 | 0 | 0 | 0 |
| 33 | DF | (Australia) AUS | Alanna Kennedy | 22 | 1 | 13+1 | 1 | 4 | 0 | 3+1 | 0 | 0 | 0 |
| 34 | GK | (France) FRA | Karima Benameur Taieb | 15 | 0 | 10 | 0 | 0 | 0 | 3 | 0 | 2 | 0 |
| 35 | GK | (England) ENG | Khiara Keating | 5 | 0 | 2+1 | 0 | 0 | 0 | 2 | 0 | 0 | 0 |
| 41 | MF | (Norway) NOR | Julie Blakstad | 13 | 1 | 3+5 | 1 | 0+3 | 0 | 0+2 | 0 | 0 | 0 |
| 42 | FW | (England) ENG | Ginny Lackey | 1 | 0 | 0 | 0 | 0+1 | 0 | 0 | 0 | 0 | 0 |
| 43 | MF | (England) ENG | Jemima Dahou | 1 | 0 | 0 | 0 | 0+1 | 0 | 0 | 0 | 0 | 0 |
Players who appeared for the club but left during the season:
| 11 | FW | (Canada) CAN | Janine Beckie | 20 | 2 | 5+6 | 1 | 1+1 | 0 | 4+1 | 1 | 1+1 | 0 |

== Transfers and loans ==
=== Transfers in ===
| Date | Position | No. | Player | From club |
|---|---|---|---|---|
| 11 June 2021 | MF | 30 | (England) Ruby Mace | (England) Arsenal |
| 17 June 2021 | FW | 21 | (Jamaica) Khadija Shaw | (France) Bordeaux |
| 5 July 2021 | MF | 17 | (Spain) Vicky Losada | (Spain) Barcelona |
| 18 August 2021 | FW | 13 | (Australia) Hayley Raso | (England) Everton |
| 27 August 2021 | DF | 33 | (Australia) Alanna Kennedy | (England) Tottenham Hotspur |
| 2 September 2021 | MF | 12 | (Sweden) Filippa Angeldal | (Sweden) BK Häcken |
| 27 January 2022 | MF | 41 | (Norway) Julie Blakstad | (Norway) Rosenborg |

=== Transfers out ===
| Date | Position | No. | Player | To club |
|---|---|---|---|---|
| 17 May 2021 | MF | 21 | (United States) Rose Lavelle | (United States) OL Reign |
| 17 May 2021 | MF | 22 | (United States) Sam Mewis | (United States) North Carolina Courage |
| 17 May 2021 | DF | 5 | (Republic of Ireland) Megan Campbell | (England) Liverpool |
| 1 July 2021 | DF | 2 | (England) Aoife Mannion | (England) Manchester United |
| 1 July 2021 | MF | 12 | (Republic of Ireland) Tyler Toland | (Scotland) Celtic |
| 1 July 2021 | FW | 17 | (South Korea) Lee Geum-min | (England) Brighton & Hove Albion |
| 20 August 2021 | DF | 13 | (United States) Abby Dahlkemper | (United States) Houston Dash |
| 1 April 2022 | FW | 11 | (Canada) Janine Beckie | (United States) Portland Thorns |

=== Loans out ===
| Start date | End date | Position | No. | Player | To club |
|---|---|---|---|---|---|
| 13 August 2021 | 30 June 2022 | GK | 35 | (England) Khiara Keating (Note: Dual registration) | (England) Fylde |
