= Jess Park =

English footballer (born 2001)

- Park with Manchester United in 2026

Personal information
- Full name: Jessica Victoria Janet Park
- Date of birth: 21 October 2001 (age 25)
- Place of birth: Brough, East Riding of Yorkshire, England
- Height: 1.61 m (5 ft 3 1/2 in)
- Position: Midfielder

Team information
- Current team: Manchester United
- Number: 8

Youth career
- –: Hull City
- 2017: York City
- 2017: Manchester City

Senior career*
Years	Team	Apps	(Gls)
2017–2025	Manchester City	65	(9)
2022–2023	→ Everton (loan)	17	(3)
2025–	Manchester United	33	(6)

International career^{‡}
2017–2018	England U17	13	(8)
2018–2020	England U19	19	(24)
2022–	England U23	3	(0)
2022–	England	28	(5)
Medal record
Women's football
Representing England
UEFA Women's Championship
Winner	2025 Switzerland
UEFA–CONMEBOL Finalissima
Winner	2023 England
- * Club domestic league appearances and goals as of 18:50, 22 November 2026 (UTC) ‡ National team caps and goals as of 00:05, 14 October 2026 (UTC)

Jessica Victoria Janet Park (born 21 October 2001) is an English professional footballer who plays as a winger or attacking midfielder for Women's Super League club Manchester United and the England national team. Park began her senior career with Manchester City, where she became a two-time League Cup and a one-time FA Cup winner. She previously represented England at under-17, under-19, and under-23 level. She was part of the England squad which won UEFA Euro 2025.

== Club career ==
=== Manchester City ===
Park made her senior debut for Manchester City on 6 December 2017, coming on as a substitute in a 3–2 win over Doncaster Belles in the 2017–18 FA WSL Cup. On 5 December 2018, she scored her first senior goal for the club in a 6–0 victory against Sheffield United, followed by another against Aston Villa on 13 December in a 4–0 win, helping City to win the 2018–19 League Cup.

At the age of 17, Park made her UEFA Champions League debut on 25 September 2019 as part of the starting eleven against Lugano in a 4–0 victory, as part of the 2019–20 season round of 32.

On 16 February 2020, she scored one of three hat tricks in a 10–0 win against Ipswich Town in the 2019–20 FA Cup. On 4 April, Park signed her first professional contract with Manchester City, keeping her at the club until 2023. On 1 November, she featured in the 2020 FA Cup final as a 70th-minute substitute, providing an assist in extra time to break the tie, resulting in a 3–1 victory.

On 13 October 2021, in the 2021–22 League Cup, Park scored against Everton in a 5–1 win in the group stage, followed by the opening goal in the 3–0 semi-final win against Tottenham Hotspur, as well as providing two assists, helping City to win the tournament that season. She was awarded Manchester City's Rising Star award for the 2021–22 season.

On 14 June 2022, Park signed a three-year extension with Manchester City until 2026, having scored 9 goals in 57 appearances for the club. After signing she stated, "This is my Club and this is where I want to be." Manager Gareth Taylor said Park is "very much a big part of our plans here at City".

==== Everton (loan) ====
On 15 July 2022, it was announced that she would spend the 2022–23 season on loan at Everton. In the 2022–23 League Cup, Park scored against Sheffield United on 26 November 2022 in a 3–0 win, and against Manchester United on 7 December 2022 in a 4–2 defeat.

On 12 May 2023, Park returned to Manchester City after sustaining a shoulder injury during training. With Everton, she made 22 appearances, scored five goals, and provided five assists.

==== 2023–24 ====
In September 2023, Park was nominated for the North West Football Awards Rising Star award. On 11 October, in the 2023–24 League Cup, she scored the opening goal against former club Everton in a 2–1 win, followed by an equaliser against Liverpool leading to a 4–3 victory on 8 November.

In the quarter-finals of the tournament on 7 February 2024, Park provided an assist to Yui Hasegawa for the winning goal against Tottenham Hotspur. Nine days later, in her first start of the WSL season, Park played an integral role in ending Chelsea's 22–match winning run at home, dispossessing captain Erin Cuthbert in order to provide the assist for Bunny Shaw to secure a 1–0 away win, and consequently help City to level on points with Chelsea at the top of the table. Park was described by The Guardian as City's "surprise revelation", and by Goal.com as a "live wire both in and out of possession".

==== 2024–25 ====
External video
- Every Angle: Jess Park Worldie v Arsenal 🔥 Barclays Goal of The Month September 24–25, Barclays Women's Super League via YouTube

For September 2024, Park's long-range goal against Arsenal was voted as the WSL Goal of Month. On 3 November, she scored another long-range goal from approximately 25–30 yards out, described as "an unstoppable strike" that curled into the top corner, putting City ahead against Crystal Palace.

=== Manchester United ===
==== 2025–26 ====
On 4 September 2025, it was announced that Park had signed for Manchester United on a four-year deal. After making her debut in the opening WSL match of the season against Leicester City on 7 September, she scored her first goal for United a week later in a 5–1 win against London City Lionesses. In October, having scored twice against Everton as a substitute, BBC Sport described Park as flourishing alongside teammate Ella Toone and as a "key figure for [manager] Marc Skinner". Former England striker Ellen White remarked that her role in the team appears freer than it was at Manchester City. Following her move to United, Park played more frequently from the left wing and with increased freedom to roam, with Park saying "I have just enjoyed having that freedom. For sure, I can score and assist goals, but I'll play wherever on the pitch. I'm not bothered here."

External video
- 'Brilliant' Park strikes again for Man Utd, BBC Sport, Manchester United vs. Atletico Madrid

Park was awarded the WSL Goal of the Month for her contribution against Aston Villa in January 2026. The following month, United beat Atlético Madrid 2–0 to reach the quarter-finals of the 2025–26 UEFA Champions League, with Park scoring a stunning long range effort into the top corner, the second goal to secure a 5–0 victory on aggregate. At the end of the season, Park won both the Player of the Year and Players' Player of the Year awards for the club and was later named in the PFA WSL Team of the Year.

== International career ==
=== Youth ===
Park has represented England at under-17 and under-19 level, and currently plays at under-23 level.

On 5 October 2017, Park was named as part of the England under-17 squad for 2018 U-17 Championship qualification. She scored a hat-trick against Latvia in a 10–0 win on 14 October, followed by two goals against Scotland in a 3–0 victory on 20 October. Park's scored her sixth goal in the qualification stages against Norway for a 2–0 result on 31 March 2018 In May 2018, in the final tournament, Park scored an equalising goal as captain against Poland in a 2–2 draw as well as captained the team in a 2–1 defeat to Spain. On 21 May she scored the opening goal in a 2–1 defeat to Finland in the 2018 U-17 World Cup play-off, with the U-17 team finishing in fourth-place in the 2018 Championship.

In October 2018 for 2019 U-19 Championship qualification, Park scored the final goal for England under-19s as an 82nd minute substitute against Malta in a 9–0 victory, going on to score four more goals against Croatia in an 8–0 win. In February 2019, Park was named as part of the U-19 squad for La Manga Tournament, scoring the opening goal against China in am emphatic 5–1 victory on 2 March. She was also named as part of the U-19 squad for elite round qualification in April 2019, but subsequently withdrew due to injury. Park would go on to play in the group stage matches in the 2019 U-19 Championship against Spain and Belgium, where the team failed to advance to the knock-out stage.

In October 2019 for 2020 U-19 Championship qualification, Park scored a hat-trick against Cyprus in an 8–0 win, followed by the final goal against Belarus as a substitute in a 3–0 victory. The tournament was subsequently cancelled due to the COVID-19 pandemic in Europe.

Park featured in the starting eleven of the England U23 team in matches against France and Norway in 2022. Following her senior debut, she was called up to the under-23 squad for the new U23 European League, and played against France on 30 November 2023.

=== Senior ===
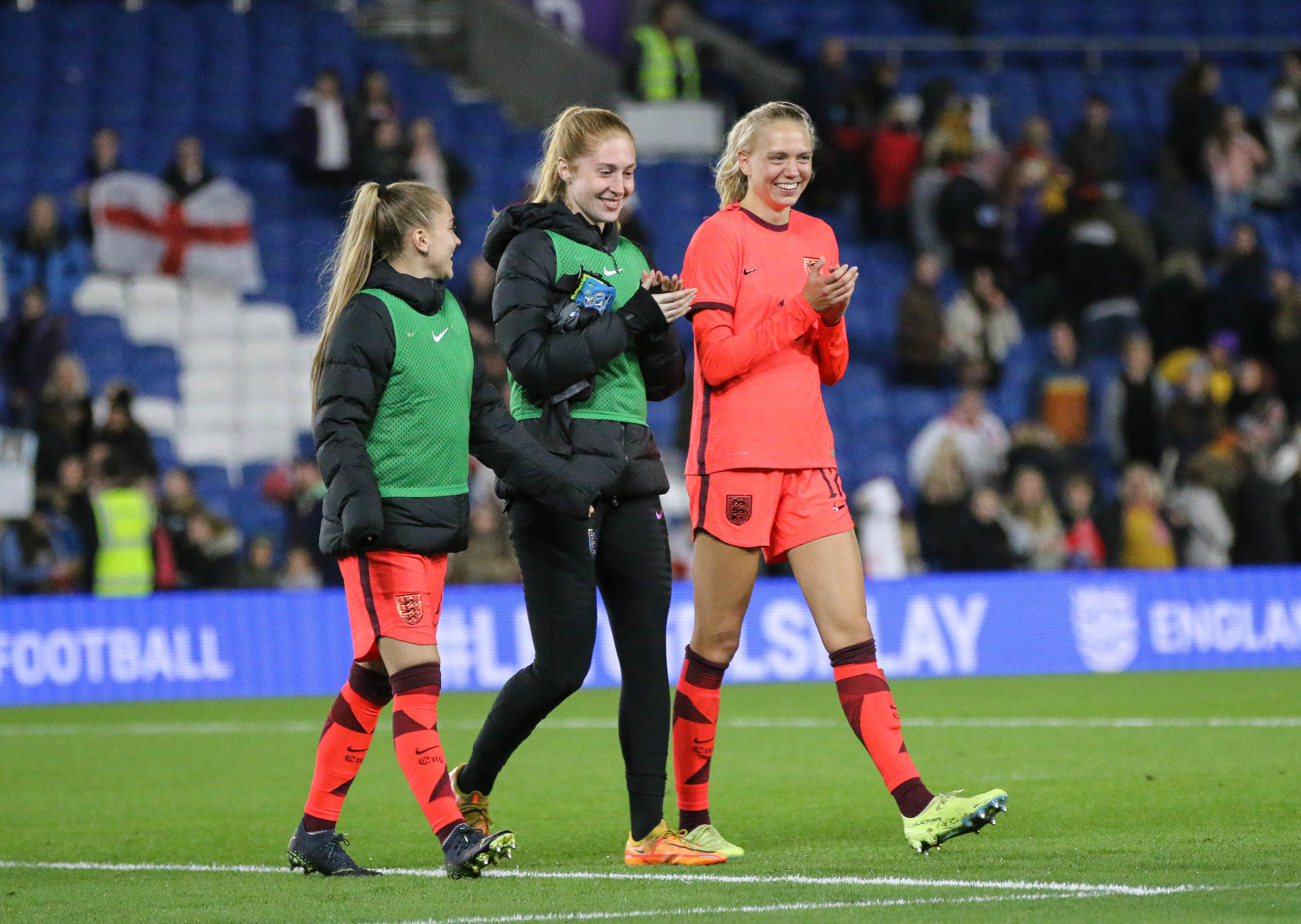
Park (left) with teammates Sandy MacIver and Esme Morgan at the England match against Czech Republic, 11 October 2022

On 27 September 2022, Park received her first senior international call-up for the friendly matches against the United States and the Czech Republic, where she was an unused substitute in both matches. She received her second call-up on 4 November, to replace Fran Kirby.

Park made her senior debut as an 89th-minute substitute during a friendly match against Japan on 11 November 2022. Just over a minute later, she scored her first international goal, the fourth in a 4–0 victory. On 18 November 2022, her England legacy number was announced as number 225.

She made her first senior start for England in the 2023 Arnold Clark Cup against Italy in a 2–1 win on 19 February, as well as coming on as a substitute against Belgium in a 6–1 victory, with the Lionesses winning the tournament for the second consecutive year.

Park was included on the standby list of players named to the squad for the 2023 FIFA World Cup in July 2023, where she trained alongside the full squad. Park later withdrew due to injury and was replaced with Lucy Staniforth.

In September 2023, Park was named as part of the squad for 2023–24 Nations League matches, replacing an injured Bethany England. In November 2024, she was selected for friendly fixtures against the United States and Switzerland.

Park was named in England's squad for UEFA Euro 2025 in June that year. She was an unused substitute in the tournament's final in which England beat Spain on penalties to retain their European title.

Park scored twice in England's opening match of the 2027 FIFA World Cup qualification campaign, a 6–1 win against Ukraine on 3 March 2026, with Park playing on the wing rather than her previously more common midfield position.

== Style of play ==
Park was described as a winger by Manchester City in September 2023, but since returning the club for the 2023–24 season, she has adopted a more central role to play as a number 8 and 10, where she can drive between lines of players. She has been credited by The Guardian with having "technical abilities, speed and awareness", an aggressive press, as well as defensive maturity.

== Career statistics ==
=== Club ===
As of match played 22 November 2026

Appearances and goals by club, season and competition
Club	Season	League			FA Cup (Note: Includes the Women's FA Cup)		League Cup (Note: Includes the WSL Cup/Women's League Cup)		Continental (Note: Includes the UEFA Women's Champions League)		Total	
Club	Season	Division	Apps	Goals	Apps	Goals	Apps	Goals	Apps	Goals	Apps	Goals
Manchester City	2017–18	Women's Super League	0	0	0	0	1	0	0	0	1	0
Manchester City	2018–19	Women's Super League	2	0	0	0	3	1	0	0	5	1
Manchester City	2019–20	Women's Super League	2	0	4	3	3	0	1	0	10	3
Manchester City	2020–21	Women's Super League	9	0	0	0	4	2	2	0	15	2
Manchester City	2021–22	Women's Super League	13	0	3	0	6	2	1	0	23	2
Manchester City	2023–24	Women's Super League	18	4	3	0	6	2	—		27	6
Manchester City	2024–25	Women's Super League	21	5	4	1	3	0	10	2	38	8
Manchester City	Total		65	9	14	4	26	7	14	2	119	22
Everton (loan)	2022–23	Women's Super League	17	3	1	0	4	2	—		22	5
Manchester United	2025–26	Women's Super League	22	6	2	0	3	1	11	2	38	9
Manchester United	2026–27	Women's Super League	11	0	0	0	2	0	—		13	0
Manchester United	Total		33	6	2	0	5	1	11	2	51	9
Career total			115	18	17	4	35	10	25	4	192	36

=== International ===
As of match played 13 October 2026

Appearances and goals by national team and year
National team	Year	Apps	Goals
England	2022	1	1
England	2023	4	0
England	2024	8	0
England	2025	9	2
England	2026	6	2
Total		28	5

Scores and results list England's goal tally first, score column indicates score after each Park goal.

List of international goals scored by Jess Park
No.	Date	Venue	Opponent	Score	Result	Competition	Ref.
1	11 November 2022	Pinatar Arena, Murcia, Spain	Japan	4–0	4–0	Friendly	
2	26 February 2025	Wembley Stadium, London, England	Spain	1–0	1–0	2025 UEFA Women's Nations League	
3	4 April 2025	Ashton Gate, Bristol, England	Belgium	4–0	5–0	2025 UEFA Women's Nations League	
4	3 March 2026	Mardan Sports Complex, Antalya, Turkey	Ukraine	5–1	6–1	2027 FIFA Women's World Cup qualification	
5	3 March 2026	Mardan Sports Complex, Antalya, Turkey	Ukraine	6–1	6–1	2027 FIFA Women's World Cup qualification	

== Honours ==
Manchester City

- FA Cup: 2019–20; runner-up: 2021–22
- League Cup: 2018–19, 2021–22; runner-up: 2024–25

Manchester United

- Women's League Cup runner-up: 2025–26

England

- UEFA Women's Championship: 2025
- Women's Finalissima: 2023
- Arnold Clark Cup: 2023

Individual

- UEFA Women's Under-17 Championship Team of the Tournament: 2018
- Manchester City's Rising Star Award: 2021–22
- Manchester United Player of the Year: 2025–26
- Manchester United Players' Player of the Year: 2025–26
- WSL Player of the Month: March 2024, October 2025
- WSL Goal of the Month: September 2024, January 2026, February 2026
- PFA WSL Team of the Year: 2025–26
- PFA WSL Fans' Player of the Month: October 2025
