= Khiara Keating =

English footballer (born 2004)

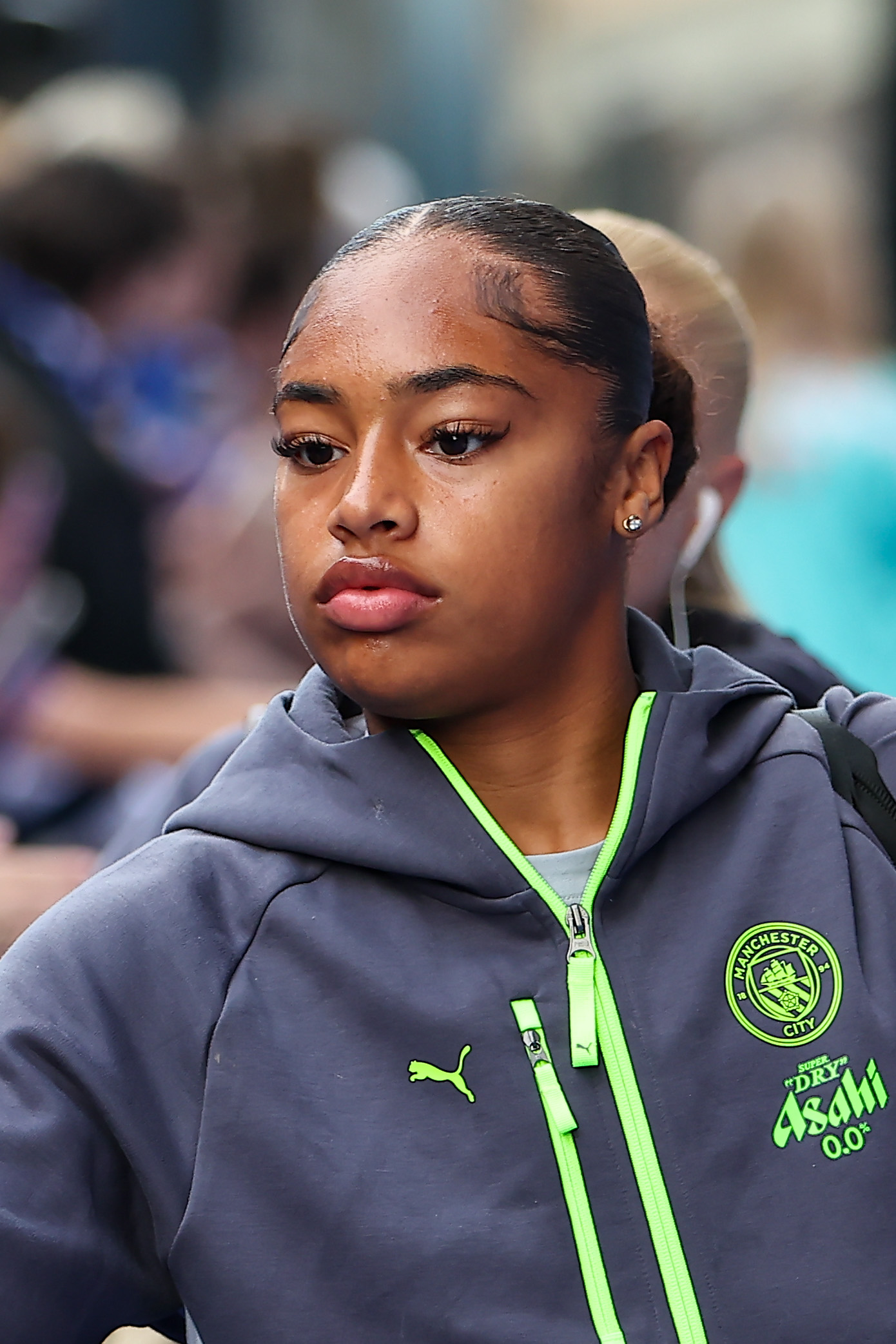
- Keating in 2025

Personal information
- Full name: Khiara Ilhaan Keating
- Date of birth: 27 June 2004 (age 22)
- Place of birth: Ardwick, Manchester, England
- Height: 1.67 m (5 ft 6 in)
- Position: Goalkeeper

Team information
- Current team: Liverpool
- Number: 12

Youth career
- 2009–2014: Manchester United
- 2014–2022: Manchester City

Senior career*
Years	Team	Apps	(Gls)
2020–2026	Manchester City	44	(0)
2021	→ AFC Fylde (loan)	7	(0)
2023	→ Coventry United (loan)	4	(0)
2026–	Liverpool	4	(0)

International career^{‡}
2019	England U15	1	(0)
2021–2022	England U19	9	(0)
2022–	England U23	3	(0)
2025–	England	1	(0)
Medal record
Women's football
Representing England
UEFA Women's Championship
Winner	2025 Switzerland
- * Club domestic league appearances and goals as of 15:49, 28 September 2026 (UTC) ‡ National team caps and goals as of 21:00, 25 October 2025 (UTC)

Khiara Ilhaan Keating (/kiˈɑːrə ɪlˈhɑːn/ kee-AR-ə il-HAHN; born 27 June 2004) is an English professional footballer who currently plays as a goalkeeper for Women's Super League club Liverpool and the England national team.

== Early life ==
Keating grew up in Ardwick, Manchester, where her mother set up a team for her to play in, initially as a striker. She trialed for Manchester United as a goalkeeper at 6 years-old. Keating played for Manchester United until the age of 11, before moving across to the City academy. She is of mixed English and Jamaican descent.

== Club career ==
=== Manchester City ===
==== 2021–2023; first-team debut and loan periods ====
Keating made appearances on the bench for Manchester City, during the 2020–21 season, before being loaned out to National League North's AFC Fylde at the start of the next season.

Due to a long injury list at Manchester City however she was recalled after a short period and a few appearances as cover for more senior players. She made her debut for the side on 12 January 2022, starting in a FA Women's League Cup against Leicester City. A few days later on 16 January 2022 she made her league debut with 90 minutes against Aston Villa.

In January 2023, Keating joined Coventry United on loan until the end of the 2022–23 Women's Championship season, making four appearances in total of the club.

==== 2023–2026 ====
In October 2023, Keating was nominated for WSL Player of the Month for the 2023–2024 season. In November, she signed a three-year extension with City, after starting in the first six games of the season, describing her breakthrough as surreal.

As of December 2023, Keating had the third-highest save percentage of the league for the season, and according to Goal.com, is part of an entirely new generation of goalkeepers. She became City's first-choice goalkeeper after displacing Ellie Roebuck.

In the fifth round of the 2023–24 FA Cup against Arsenal on 11 February 2024, Keating provided a "worldie" performance. Her series of saves were met with critical acclaim, being described as a hero, and playing a starring role to secure a 1–0 victory.

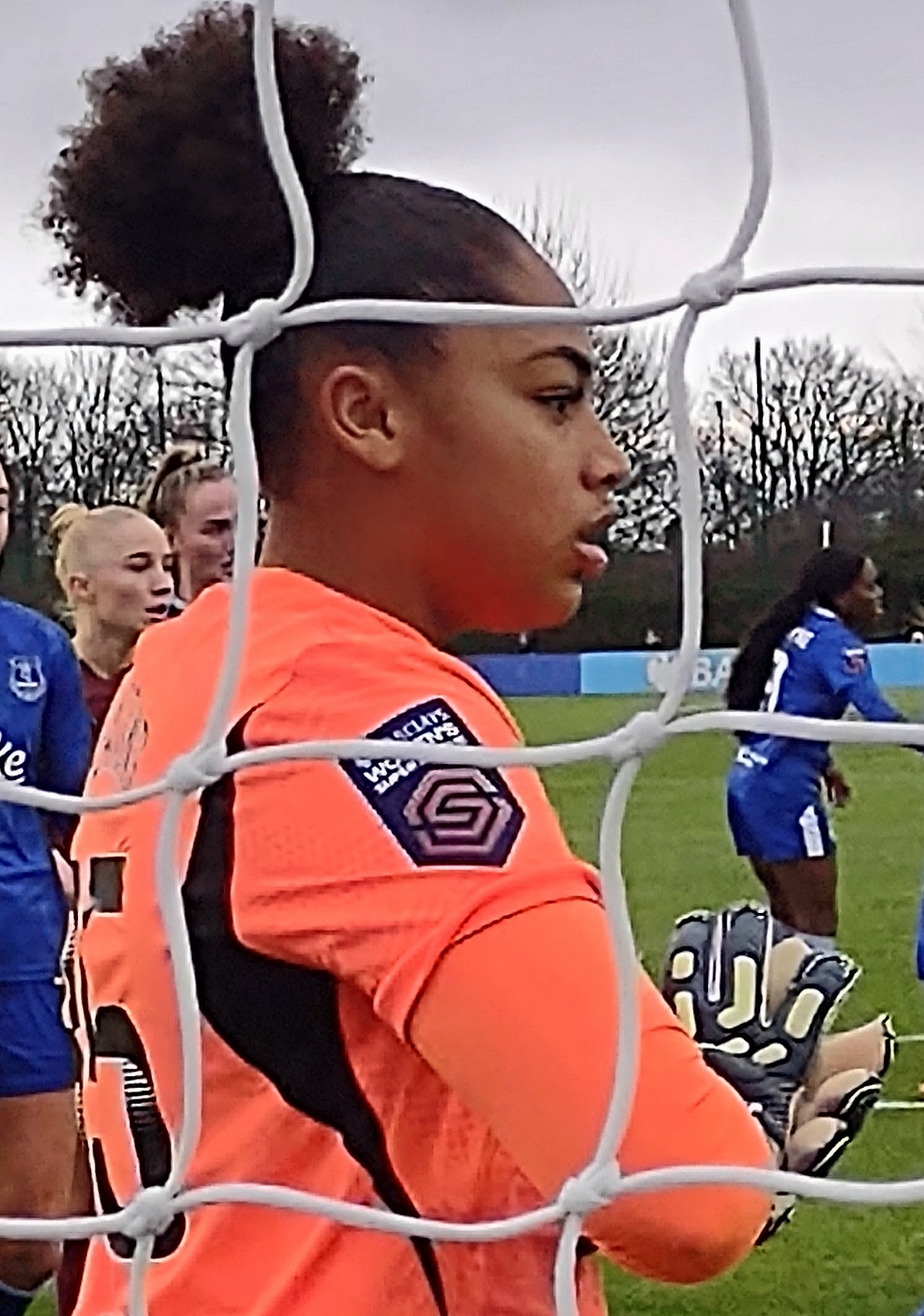
Keating playing for Manchester City in December 2024

Keating became the youngest goalkeeper to win the WSL Golden Glove, keeping 9 clean sheets in total. She finished the season with the most minutes played for an English under-21 year old in the WSL season, helping to successfully gain a call up to the senior squad.

In June 2026, the BBC reported that Keating had rejected a contract extension with City to pursue consistent playing time.

=== Liverpool ===
In July 2026, Keating left Manchester City and joined fellow WSL club Liverpool. She was understood to have signed a three year contract with the club.

== International career ==
=== Youth ===
She made one appearance for England under-15's and made her debut for the under 19 side in 2022 U-19 Championship qualification against the Republic of Ireland on 20 October 2021, keeping a clean sheet in a 1–0. In summer of 2022, she started in each group stage of the final tournament. On 25 August 2022, Keating was named as part of the England under-23 squad for a fixture against Norway, where she was as unused substitute keeper. In October 2022, Keating played in 2023 U-19 Championship qualification with the under 19s, keeping a clean sheet against Slovenia. In September and November 2023 she was again selected for the team despite not making any appearances.

On 28 November 2024, Keating made her debut for the under-23s against Norway as part of a U23 Euro fixture resulting in a 0–0 draw.

=== Senior ===
Keating received her first senior call-up on 17 October 2023 for a pair of UEFA Nations League matches against Belgium. On 6 June 2025, Keating was named in England's squad for UEFA Euro 2025, though she remained uncapped at the time of her selection. Keating did not play during the tournament as England went on to win their second consecutive European title, but was praised for her role as part of the team off of the pitch.

Keating made her senior international debut on 25 October 2025 during a 2–1 friendly defeat against Brazil. In doing so, she became the first black women's goalkeeper to play for England at senior level.

Following her senior international debut, Keating was awarded legacy number 236.

== Personal life ==
On 23 July 2024, Keating appeared at Manchester and Salford Magistrates Court, alongside her mother Nicola, charged with possession of a Class C drug namely canisters of nitrous oxide. Both women pleaded not guilty and the case was adjourned until a further hearing at the same court on 10 September. At that second hearing both women confirmed their not guilty pleas and a trial date was set for 17 November 2025. On 20 June 2025, the charges were dropped and the case discontinued.

On 30 July 2025 at Tameside Magistrates Court, Keating was found guilty of failing to pay car tax. She was fined £440 and ordered to pay £79.79 of back car tax and £120 court costs.

== Career statistics ==
=== Club ===
As of match played 27 September 2026

Appearances and goals by club, season and competition
Club	Season	League			FA cup		League cup		Continental		Total	
Club	Season	Division	Apps	Goals	Apps	Goals	Apps	Goals	Apps	Goals	Apps	Goals
Manchester City	2020–21	Women's Super League	0	0	0	0	0	0	0	0	0	0
Manchester City	2021–22	Women's Super League	3	0	0	0	2	0	0	0	5	0
Manchester City	2022–23	Women's Super League	3	0	0	0	0	0	0	0	3	0
Manchester City	2023–24	Women's Super League	22	0	3	0	4	0	—		29	0
Manchester City	2024–25	Women's Super League	12	0	1	0	1	0	5	0	19	0
Manchester City	2025–26	Women's Super League	4	0	4	0	1	0	—		9	0
Manchester City	Total		44	0	8	0	8	0	5	0	65	0
AFC Fylde (loan)	2021–22	Women's National League North	7	0	0	0	0	0	—		7	0
Coventry United (loan)	2022–23	Championship	4	0	0	0	0	0	—		4	0
Liverpool	2026–27	Women's Super League	4	0	0	0	0	0	—		4	0
Career total			59	0	8	0	8	0	5	0	80	0

=== International ===
As of match played 25 October 2025.

Appearances and goals by national team and year
National team	Year	Apps	Goals
England	2025	1	0
Total		1	0

== Honours ==
Manchester City

- Women's Super League: 2025–26
- FA Women's League Cup: 2021–22

England

- UEFA Women's Championship: 2025

Individual

- Manchester City Rising Star Award: 2022–23
- WSL Golden Glove: 2023–24
- WSL Player of the Month: February 2024
- PFA WSL Team of the Year: 2023–24
