= Ellie Roebuck =

English footballer

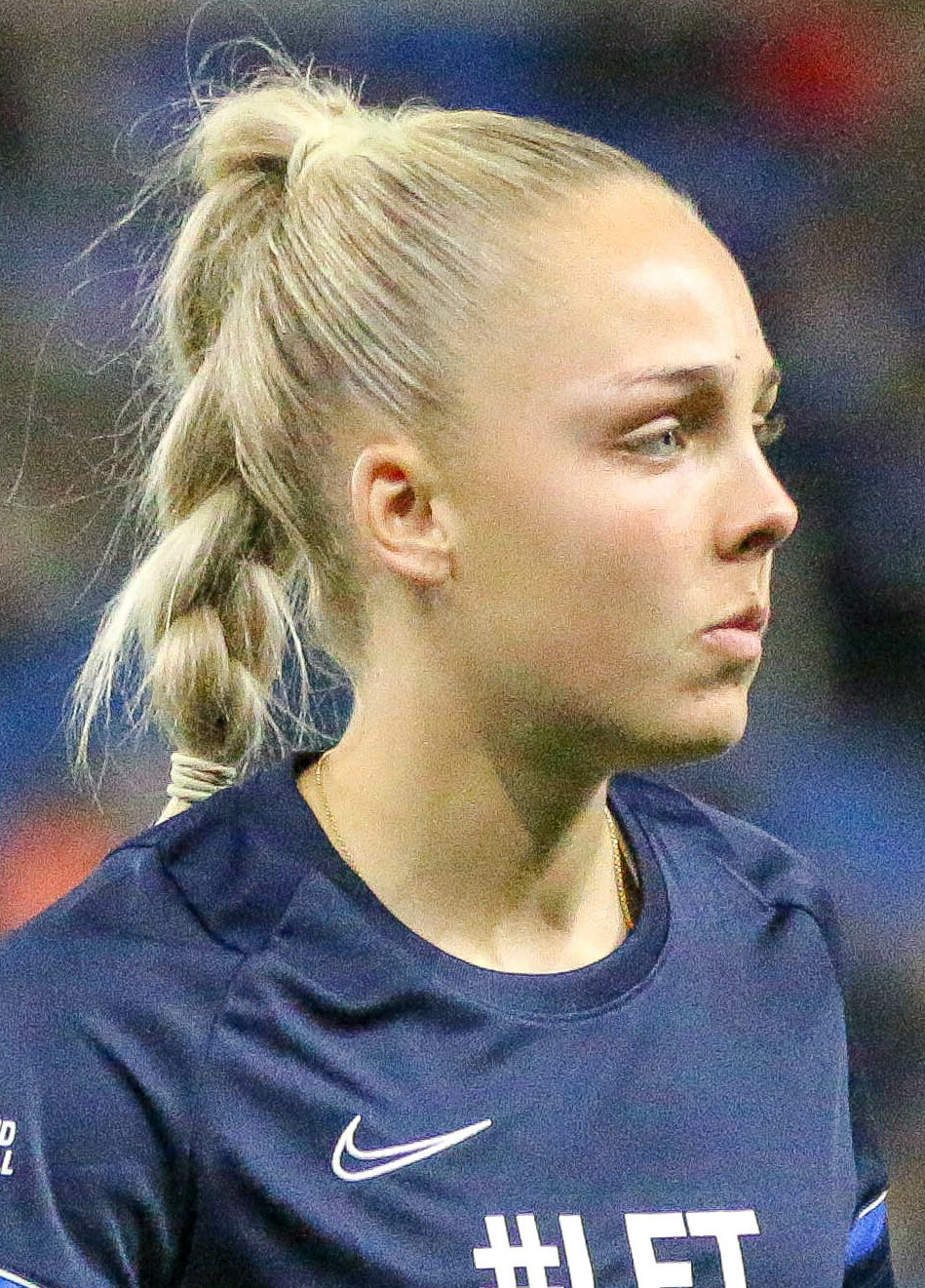
- Roebuck with England in 2022

Personal information
- Full name: Ellie Roebuck
- Date of birth: 23 September 1999 (age 27)
- Place of birth: Sheffield, England
- Height: 5 ft 9 in (1.75 m)
- Position: Goalkeeper

Team information
- Current team: Aston Villa
- Number: 26

Youth career
- –2015: Sheffield United
- 2015–2018: Manchester City

Senior career*
| Years | Team | Apps | (Gls) |
| 2016–2024 | Manchester City | 93 | (0) |
| 2024–2025 | Barcelona | 2 | (0) |
| 2025– | Aston Villa | 8 | (0) |

International career^{‡}
| 2015–2016 | England U17 | 12 | (0) |
| 2017 | England U19 | 4 | (0) |
| 2018– | England | 11 | (0) |
| 2021– | Great Britain | 4 | (0) |
Medal record
Women's football
Representing England
UEFA Women's Championship
| Winner | 2022 England |
UEFA–CONMEBOL Finalissima
| Winner | 2023 England |
FIFA Women's World Cup
| Runner-up | 2023 Australia and New Zealand |
- * Club domestic league appearances and goals as of 29 March 2026 ‡ National team caps and goals as of 19 February 2023

Ellie Roebuck (born 23 September 1999) is an English professional footballer who plays as a goalkeeper for Women's Super League club Aston Villa and the England national team. She previously played for Manchester City and Barcelona and represented Great Britain at the Olympics. With City, Roebuck won the Women's Super League once, and the FA Cup and League Cup three times each. With Barcelona, she is a Liga F, Copa de la Reina and Supercopa de España winner.

== Early life ==
Ellie Roebuck was born on 23 September 1999 in Sheffield, South Yorkshire, England. She grew up a fan of Sheffield United, getting her first season ticket at the age of five, as well as admiring FC Barcelona – for her eighth birthday, her family went to the Joan Gamper Trophy match at the Camp Nou.

Roebuck started playing grassroots football with Beighton Magpies in Sheffield; as part of the "Where Greatness Is Made" campaign, a plaque honouring Roebuck was installed at the club. She then joined Sheffield United's Centre of Excellence, staying until she was 15.

Whilst at Manchester City, she attended Connell Sixth Form College to complete a sports qualification.

== Club career ==
=== Manchester City, 2015–24 ===
==== 2015–17 ====
Roebuck joined the Manchester City development squad when she was 15. She began to be involved with the first team in 2017, but did not play in any of the competitions they won.

==== 2018–20 ====
In January 2018, Roebuck signed her first professional contract with Manchester City. A month later, she made her senior breakthrough from the development squad, due to an early injury to Karen Bardsley, keeping a clean sheet in a 0–0 league draw against Chelsea. She then played in the 2018 FA WSL Cup final that they lost 0–1 in March, a disappointment that had manager Nick Cushing encourage Roebuck to "write her own story" rather than be affected by the team's achievements.

On 23 May 2019, Roebuck, having been part of the side that won both the FA Cup and League Cup, extended her contract with Manchester City for another two years. At the end of the 2019–20 season, Roebuck was awarded the inaugural Barclays FA WSL Golden Glove having kept ten clean sheets in 16 league appearances. She had a 90.9% save percentage for the season.

==== 2021–23 ====
Roebuck missed much of the 2021–22 season with a calf injury, limiting her to 10 league appearances out of 22, her lowest since 2017. In addition she missed several international fixtures.

She came back strong in the 2022–23 season as City's main goalkeeper: having suffered an exodus of major players, the team got off to a rocky start before mounting an unbeaten 14-match run in the league. They then went out of the 2022–23 FA Women's League Cup in the semi-finals in February, after which they began to lose more games. In March 2023, Roebuck was outwitted by Sam Kerr in the early stages of the final of the 2023 Women's FA Cup that they lost 2–3.

Roebuck made important saves in a league loss to Liverpool on 7 May 2023, before having a poor performance against Manchester derby rivals Manchester United on 21 May 2023, in what was her last game for the club. Eventually losing 1–2, City conceded a goal due to defensive errors in the second minute, and Roebuck received a red card 40 minutes later for a bad tackle outside of the box.

==== 2023–24 ====
In the 2023–24 season, Roebuck was included in the matchday squad six times, but did not play. On 30 March 2024, Roebuck disclosed that she had suffered an infarct in her occipital lobe earlier in the season. When she received the test results, Roebuck was worried she would not be able to play football again, before being reassured that she would recover. In announcing the reason for her absence, she said she had noticed symptoms for a while but would have "no lasting damage to her brain function or vision" and was recovering well. At the time, she had not featured in the season, nor for the England national team in the same period. Roebuck had already been connected to a move to European champions Barcelona in January 2024, and spent time there during her recovery with former City teammate Keira Walsh; Roebuck's departure was announced by Manchester City on 18 May 2024.

=== Barcelona, 2024–25 ===
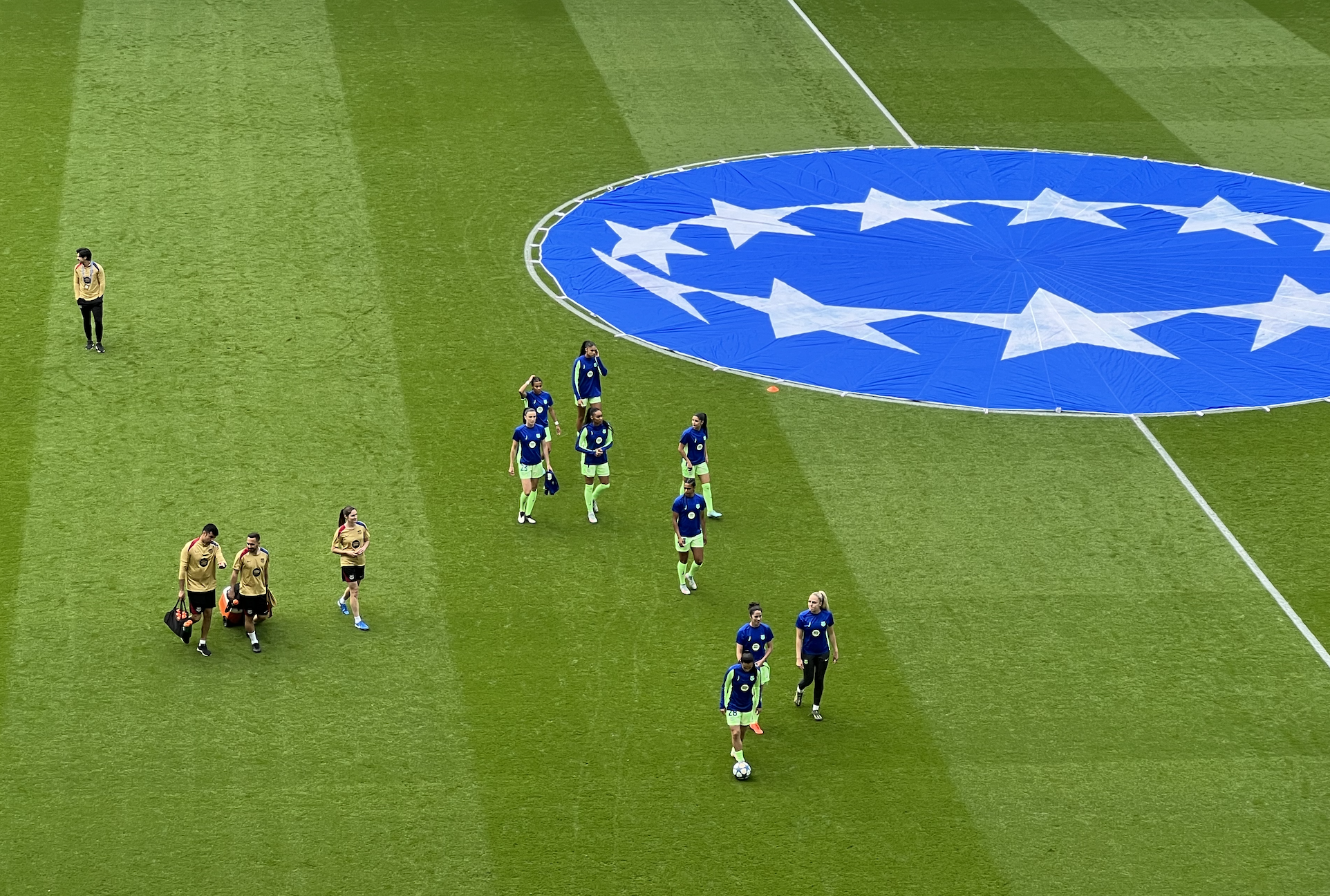
Roebuck (bottom right) with Barcelona in 2025

Having not played for City since May 2023, Roebuck signed a pre-contract for Barcelona in April 2024, to join at the end of the season. On 19 June 2024, Barcelona announced the signing of Roebuck on a two-year deal. Roebuck said of the move that she was looking forward to play for the club, calling it "the perfect team" for how she likes to play with the ball at her feet. Barcelona had been kept in the know of Roebuck's stroke and recovery for the whole process, and she undertook further rehabilitation when she joined the team in preparation to play again. Her rehabilitation included travelling with the squad to the United States during pre-season, without being available to play. She was included in a Barcelona matchday squad for the first time on 9 October 2024, for their 2024–25 Champions League match against Manchester City. Nineteen months after her previous match, Roebuck made her debut for Barcelona on 7 December 2024 in a 4–1 win against Real Betis; a strong debut, she was denied a clean sheet in the last minute through an error in the outfield. After only making one further appearance during the season in a 2–1 defeat against Levante on 1 February 2025, it was announced on 7 July that year that Barcelona had agreed to terminate Roebuck's contract.

=== Aston Villa, 2025– ===
On 8 July 2025, Roebuck returned to the WSL after signing for Aston Villa on a two-year deal.

== International career ==
=== England ===
==== Youth ====
Roebuck played in the 2016 U-17 European Championship, helping her team win third place. This qualified England for the 2016 U-17 World Cup in Jordan, where Roebuck played in all four games until her team was defeated in the quarterfinals by defending champions Japan. Roebuck was part of the England squad that won the bronze medal in the 2018 U20 World Cup in France, however, she was an unused substitute in all fixtures behind Sandy MacIver. In April 2017, she played in the second qualifying round for the 2017 U-19 European Championship in the 7–0 win against the Czech Republic.

==== Senior ====
In October 2018, England manager Phil Neville named Roebuck and Manchester City team-mate Georgia Stanway in his squad for the first time. Roebuck made her senior team debut as a 79th minute substitute for Mary Earps on 8 November 2018 against Austria. She made her first start, before being replaced by Earps at half time, in a 2–1 win against Spain on 9 April 2019.

Roebuck was included in the England squad which won the Euro 2022 as well as the 2023 World Cup. Having missed previous camps she returned to the squad in November 2025, and in February 2026, was selected for 2027 FIFA Women's World Cup qualification matches, again replacing Khiara Keating.

=== Great Britain ===
On 27 May 2021 it was announced that Roebuck had been selected as one of the two goalkeepers in the Great Britain team for the 2020 Olympics. She made her debut on 21 July 2021 in a 2–0 win against Chile. She played in all four games until they were eliminated in the quarterfinals by Australia.

== Style of play ==
As a goalkeeper, Roebuck "enjoys dribbling, enjoys playing on the ball". She can recover balls and stop attackers with her feet when coming off her line, and also use her footwork to attack, playing out from the back by being involved in passing sequences, or being able to pass out long herself. Having the skill to break lines through passing out from her area, she can also use her ability on the ball to create space.

== Career statistics ==
=== Club ===
As of match played 29 March 2026.

Appearances and goals by club, season and competition
| Club | Season | League | | | National cup (Note: Includes the Women's FA Cup and Copa de la Reina) | | League cup (Note: Includes the WSL Cup/Women's League Cup and Supercopa de España) | | Continental (Note: Includes the UEFA Women's Champions League) | | Other | | Total | |
| Club | Season | Division | Apps | Goals | Apps | Goals | Apps | Goals | Apps | Goals | Apps | Goals | Apps | Goals |
|---|---|---|---|---|---|---|---|---|---|---|---|---|---|---|
| Manchester City | 2016 | WSL 1 | 1 | 0 | 0 | 0 | 0 | 0 | 0 | 0 | — | | 1 | 0 |
| Manchester City | 2017 | WSL 1 | 3 | 0 | 0 | 0 | 0 | 0 | 0 | 0 | — | | 3 | 0 |
| Manchester City | 2017–18 | WSL 1 | 11 | 0 | 1 | 0 | 0 | 0 | 5 | 0 | — | | 17 | 0 |
| Manchester City | 2018–19 | WSL | 15 | 0 | 1 | 0 | 1 | 0 | 0 | 0 | — | | 17 | 0 |
| Manchester City | 2019–20 | WSL | 16 | 0 | 1 | 0 | 6 | 0 | 6 | 0 | — | | 29 | 0 |
| Manchester City | 2020–21 | WSL | 20 | 0 | 1 | 0 | 0 | 0 | 5 | 0 | 1 (Note: Appearance in Women's FA Community Shield) | 0 | 27 | 0 |
| Manchester City | 2021–22 | WSL | 10 | 0 | 3 | 0 | 2 | 0 | 0 | 0 | — | | 15 | 0 |
| Manchester City | 2022–23 | WSL | 17 | 0 | 2 | 0 | 1 | 0 | 2 | 0 | — | | 22 | 0 |
| Manchester City | 2023–24 | WSL | 0 | 0 | 0 | 0 | 0 | 0 | — | | — | | 0 | 0 |
| Manchester City | Total | | 93 | 0 | 9 | 0 | 10 | 0 | 18 | 0 | 1 | 0 | 131 | 0 |
| Barcelona | 2024–25 | Liga F | 2 | 0 | 0 | 0 | 0 | 0 | 0 | 0 | — | | 2 | 0 |
| Aston Villa | 2025–26 | WSL | 8 | 0 | 1 | 0 | 3 | 0 | — | | — | | 12 | 0 |
| Career total | | | 103 | 0 | 10 | 0 | 13 | 0 | 18 | 0 | 1 | 0 | 145 | 0 |

=== International ===
Statistics accurate as of match played 19 February 2023.

Appearances and goals by national team and year
| National team | Year | Apps | Goals |
|---|---|---|---|
| England | 2018 | 1 | 0 |
| England | 2019 | 3 | 0 |
| England | 2020 | 1 | 0 |
| England | 2021 | 2 | 0 |
| England | 2022 | 3 | 0 |
| England | 2023 | 1 | 0 |
| Total | | 11 | 0 |

| National team | Year | Apps | Goals |
|---|---|---|---|
| Great Britain | 2021 | 4 | 0 |
| Total | | 4 | 0 |

== Honours ==
Manchester City

- FA Women's Super League: 2016
- Women's FA Cup: 2016–17, 2018–19, 2019–20
- FA Women's League Cup: 2016, 2018–19, 2021–22

Barcelona

- Liga F: 2024–25
- Copa de la Reina: 2024–25
- Supercopa de España: 2024–25

England

- FIFA Women's World Cup runner-up: 2023
- UEFA Women's Championship: 2022
- Women's Finalissima: 2023
- Arnold Clark Cup: 2022, 2023

England U20

- FIFA U-20 Women's World Cup third place: 2018

Individual

- Women's Super League Golden Glove: 2019–20
- Freedom of the City of London (announced 1 August 2022)
