= 2023–24 Women's Super League =

Women's Super League
- Season: 2023–24
- Dates: 1 October 2023 – 18 May 2024
- Champions: Chelsea; 7th title
- Relegated: Bristol City
- Champions League: Chelsea; Manchester City; Arsenal
- Matches: 132
- Goals: 437 (3.31 per match)
- Top goalscorer: Khadija Shaw (21 goals)
- Biggest home win: Chelsea 8–0 Bristol City; 5 May 2024
- Biggest away win: Aston Villa 0–6 Chelsea; 4 November 2023; Manchester United 0–6 Chelsea; 18 May 2024
- Highest scoring: Bristol City 3–7 Brighton & Hove Albion; 3 March 2024
- Longest winning run: 14 games Manchester City
- Longest unbeaten run: 14 games Manchester City
- Longest winless run: 17 games Bristol City
- Longest losing run: 9 games Bristol City
- Highest attendance: 60,160; Arsenal 3–1 Manchester United; 17 February 2024
- Total attendance: 971,977
- Average attendance: 7,363

The 2023–24 Women's Super League season (also known as the Barclays Women's Super League for sponsorship reasons) was the 13th season of the Women's Super League (WSL) since it was formed in 2010. It was the fifth season after the rebranding of the four highest levels in English women's football.

Reigning champions Chelsea won their fifth consecutive and seventh overall title. Bristol City were relegated to the Championship.

== Teams ==
Twelve teams contested the 2023–24 Women's Super League season. Bristol City were confirmed as 2022–23 Women's Championship champions on 3 April 2022, ensuring that they would return to the WSL for the first time since the 2020–21 season after a two-year absence. They replaced Reading, who were relegated after defeat on the final day to eventual WSL title winners Chelsea, ending a seven-season spell in the WSL dating back to 2016.

Locations of the 2023–24 WSL teams

Team	Location	Ground	Capacity	2022–23 season
Arsenal	Borehamwood	Meadow Park (Note: Six matches moved to Emirates Stadium.)	4,500	3rd
Aston Villa	Walsall	Bescot Stadium (Note: Three matches moved to Villa Park.)	11,300	5th
Brighton & Hove Albion	Crawley	Broadfield Stadium (Note: Two matches moved to Falmer Stadium.)	5,800	11th
Bristol City	Bristol	Ashton Gate	27,000	WC, 1st
Chelsea	Kingston upon Thames	Kingsmeadow (Note: Four matches moved to Stamford Bridge.)	4,850	1st
Everton	Liverpool	Walton Hall Park (Note: Match v Liverpool moved to Goodison Park.)	2,200	6th
Leicester City	Leicester	King Power Stadium (Note: Match v Aston Villa moved to Pirelli Stadium.)	32,212	10th
Liverpool	Birkenhead	Prenton Park (Note: Match v Everton moved to Anfield.)	16,547	7th
Manchester City	Manchester	Academy Stadium (Note: Match v Manchester United moved to City of Manchester Stadium.)	7,000	4th
Manchester United	Leigh	Leigh Sports Village (Note: Two matches moved to Old Trafford.)	12,000	2nd
Tottenham Hotspur	Leyton	Brisbane Road (Note: Two matches moved to Tottenham Hotspur Stadium.)	9,271	9th
West Ham United	Dagenham	Victoria Road	6,078	8th

=== Stadium changes ===
Ahead of the season, newly-promoted Bristol City confirmed the women's team's primary home ground would be the club's main stadium, Aston Gate. They moved from the Robins High Performance Centre in Failand after one season.

In addition, nine of the 10 clubs whose women's team played at secondary stadia moved select matches to the club's primary ground throughout the season. West Ham United were the only team not to do this. Leicester City moved one match, against Aston Villa on 19 January 2024, to their backup venue of Pirelli Stadium in Burton upon Trent, due to maintenance at the King Power.

=== Personnel and kits ===
Team	Manager	Captain	Kit manufacturer	Shirt sponsor	Shirt sponsor (sleeve)	Shirt sponsor (back)	Shorts sponsor
Arsenal	(Sweden) Jonas Eidevall	(Scotland) Kim Little	Adidas	Fly Emirates	Visit Rwanda	None	None
Aston Villa	(England) Carla Ward	(Scotland) Rachel Corsie	Castore	Cazoo	Trade Nation	None	None
Brighton & Hove Albion	(England) Mikey Harris (interim)	(Spain) Vicky Losada	Nike	American Express	Snickers UK	None	None
Bristol City	(Wales) Lauren Smith	(Republic of Ireland) Megan Connolly	O'Neills	Hubbo	UWE Bristol	Thatchers Cider	Digital NRG
Chelsea	(England) Emma Hayes	(England) Millie Bright	Nike	Infinite Athlete	BingX	None	Singer Capital Markets
Everton	(Denmark) Brian Sørensen	(England) Megan Finnigan	Hummel	Stake.com	KICK	Christopher Ward	None
Leicester City	(England) Jennifer Foster (interim)	(England) Aileen Whelan	Adidas	King Power	Bia Saigon	Sekonda	None
Liverpool	(England) Matt Beard	(Republic of Ireland) Niamh Fahey	Nike	Standard Chartered	Expedia	None	None
Manchester City	(Wales) Gareth Taylor	(England) Steph Houghton	Puma	Etihad Airways	OKX	Nissan	Joie
Manchester United	(England) Marc Skinner	(England) Katie Zelem	Adidas	TeamViewer	DXC Technology	None	None
Tottenham Hotspur	(Sweden) Robert Vilahamn	Bethany England	Nike	AIA	Cinch	Tumi	None
West Ham United	(England) Rehanne Skinner	(Australia) Mackenzie Arnold	Umbro	Betway	JD Sports	ZO Skin Health	Maldon Accident Repair Centre

=== Managerial changes ===
Team	Outgoing manager	Manner of departure	Date of vacancy	Position in table	Incoming manager	Date of appointment
West Ham United	(England) Paul Konchesky	Mutual consent	28 May 2023	End of season (8th)	(England) Rehanne Skinner	20 July 2023
Tottenham Hotspur	(England) Vicky Jepson	End of interim period	30 June 2023	End of season (9th)	(Sweden) Robert Vilahamn	7 July 2023
Brighton & Hove Albion	(United States) Melissa Phillips	Sacked	1 February 2024	10th	(England) Mikey Harris (interim)	1 February 2024
Leicester City	(Scotland) Willie Kirk	Sacked (Note: Kirk was suspended on 8 March 2024 following allegations of a relationship with a player with Foster assuming the role of interim manager. He was sacked on 28 March.)	8 March 2024	7th	(England) Jennifer Foster (interim)	8 March 2024

== League table ==
Pos	Team	Pld	W	D	L	GF	GA	GD	Pts	Qualification or relegation
1	Chelsea (C)	22	18	1	3	71	18	+53	55	Qualification for the Champions League group stage
2	Manchester City	22	18	1	3	61	15	+46	55	Qualification for the Champions League second round
3	Arsenal	22	16	2	4	53	20	+33	50	Qualification for the Champions League first round
4	Liverpool	22	12	5	5	36	28	+8	41	
5	Manchester United	22	10	5	7	42	32	+10	35	
6	Tottenham Hotspur	22	8	7	7	31	36	−5	31	
7	Aston Villa	22	7	3	12	27	43	−16	24	
8	Everton	22	6	5	11	24	37	−13	23	
9	Brighton & Hove Albion	22	5	4	13	26	48	−22	19	
10	Leicester City	22	4	6	12	26	45	−19	18	
11	West Ham United	22	3	6	13	20	45	−25	15	
12	Bristol City (R)	22	1	3	18	20	70	−50	6	Relegation to the Championship

Source: Women's Super League Table
Rules for classification: 1) Points; 2) Goal difference; 3) Number of goals scored.
(C) Champions; (R) Relegated

== Results ==
Home \ Away	ARS	AVL	BHA	BRI	CHE	EVE	LEI	LIV	MCI	MUN	TOT	WHU
Arsenal		2–1	5–0	5–0	4–1	2–1	3–0	0–1	2–1	3–1	1–0	3–0
Aston Villa	1–3		1–0	2–2	0–6	1–2	2–2	1–4	1–2	1–2	2–4	1–1
Brighton & Hove Albion	0–3	0–1		3–2	0–3	1–2	2–2	0–1	1–4	2–2	1–3	0–2
Bristol City	1–2	0–2	3–7		0–3	0–4	2–4	0–1	0–4	0–2	0–1	1–2
Chelsea	3–1	3–0	4–2	8–0		3–0	5–2	5–1	0–1	3–1	2–1	2–0
Everton	1–1	1–2	1–2	2–2	0–3		0–1	0–0	1–4	0–5	2–2	2–0
Leicester City	2–6	0–1	2–3	5–2	0–4	1–0		0–4	0–1	0–1	1–1	1–1
Liverpool	0–2	2–0	4–0	1–1	4–3	0–1	2–1		1–4	1–0	1–1	3–1
Manchester City	1–2	2–1	0–1	5–0	1–1	2–1	2–0	5–1		3–1	7–0	5–0
Manchester United	2–2	2–1	2–0	2–0	0–6	4–1	1–1	1–2	1–3		2–2	5–0
Tottenham Hotspur	1–0	1–2	1–1	3–1	0–1	1–1	1–0	1–1	0–2	0–4		3–1
West Ham United	2–1	2–3	0–0	2–3	0–2	0–1	1–1	1–1	0–2	1–1	3–4	

Source: Women's Super League Results and Fixtures
Legend: Blue = home team win; Yellow = draw; Red = away team win.

== Season statistics ==
=== Top scorers ===
Rank	Player	Club	Goals
1	(Jamaica) Khadija Shaw	Manchester City	21
2	(England) Lauren James	Chelsea	13
2	(Norway) Elisabeth Terland	Brighton & Hove Albion	13
4	(England) Alessia Russo	Arsenal	12
5	(England) Aggie Beever-Jones	Chelsea	11
5	(England) Lauren Hemp	Manchester City	11
7	(Denmark) Amalie Thestrup	Bristol City	9
8	(England) Rachel Daly	Aston Villa	8
8	(England) Beth Mead	Arsenal	8
8	(Germany) Sjoeke Nüsken	Chelsea	8
8	(England) Nikita Parris	Manchester United	8

=== Clean sheets ===
Rank	Player	Club	Clean sheets
1	(England) Khiara Keating	Manchester City	9
2	(England) Mary Earps	Manchester United	7
3	(England) Hannah Hampton	Chelsea	6
4	(Republic of Ireland) Courtney Brosnan	Everton	5
4	(England) Rachael Laws	Liverpool	5
4	(Austria) Manuela Zinsberger	Arsenal	5
7	(Sweden) Zećira Mušović	Chelsea	4
8	(Australia) Teagan Micah	Liverpool	3
9	(Australia) Mackenzie Arnold	West Ham United	2
9	(England) Sophie Baggaley	Brighton & Hove Albion	2
9	(Germany) Ann-Katrin Berger	Chelsea	2
9	(Canada) Sabrina D'Angelo	Arsenal	2
9	(Netherlands) Daphne van Domselaar	Aston Villa	2
9	(New Zealand) Anna Leat	Aston Villa	2
9	(Jamaica) Rebecca Spencer	Tottenham Hotspur	2

=== Hat-tricks ===
Player	For	Against	Result	Date	Ref.
(Scotland) Martha Thomas	Tottenham Hotspur	Aston Villa	4–2 (A)	21 October 2023	
(Germany) Sjoeke Nüsken	Chelsea	Brighton & Hove Albion	4–2 (H)	22 October 2023	
(England) Lauren James	Chelsea	Liverpool	5–1 (H)	18 November 2023	
(Jamaica) Khadija Shaw	Manchester City	Tottenham Hotspur	7–0 (H)	26 November 2023	
(Jamaica) Khadija Shaw	Manchester City	Everton	4–1 (A)	17 December 2023	
(England) Lauren James	Chelsea	Manchester United	3–1 (H)	21 January 2024	
(Jamaica) Khadija Shaw	Manchester City	Liverpool	5–1 (H)	21 January 2024	
(Norway) Guro Reiten^{4}	Chelsea	Bristol City	8–0 (H)	5 May 2024	
(Republic of Ireland) Leanne Kiernan	Liverpool	Leicester City	4–0 (A)	18 May 2024	

Notes

^{4} Player scored 4 goals

=== Discipline ===
	Most yellow cards	Total	Most red cards	Total	Ref.
Player	(France) Hawa Cissoko (West Ham United) (Republic of Ireland) Katie McCabe (Arsenal)	8	12 players	1	
Club	Liverpool	41	Manchester City	4	

=== Attendances ===
#	Football club	Average attendance
1	Arsenal	29,999
2	Manchester United	10,957
3	Chelsea	9,266
4	Manchester City	7,108
5	Bristol City	6,974
6	Aston Villa	5,100
7	Liverpool	4,668
8	Tottenham Hotspur	4,317
9	Brighton & Hove Albion	3,553
10	Leicester City	2,656
11	Everton	2,071
12	West Ham United	1,892

== Awards ==
=== Monthly awards ===
Month	Manager of the Month		Player of the Month		Goal of the Month		Ref.
Month	Manager	Club	Player	Club	Player	Club	Ref.
October	(Scotland) Willie Kirk	Leicester City	(Scotland) Martha Thomas	Tottenham Hotspur	(Canada) Cloé Lacasse (vs. Manchester United)	Arsenal	
November	(Sweden) Jonas Eidevall	Arsenal	(England) Lauren James	Chelsea	(England) Rachel Daly (vs. West Ham United)	Aston Villa	
December	(England) Matt Beard	Liverpool	(Jamaica) Khadija Shaw	Manchester City	(England) Danielle Turner (vs. Manchester City)	Aston Villa	
January	(England) Emma Hayes	Chelsea	(England) Lauren James	Chelsea	(Netherlands) Vivianne Miedema (vs. Liverpool)	Arsenal	
February	(Wales) Gareth Taylor	Manchester City	(England) Khiara Keating	Manchester City	(Italy) Aurora Galli (vs. West Ham United)	Everton	
March	(Wales) Gareth Taylor	Manchester City	(England) Jess Park	Manchester City	(Jamaica) Khadija Shaw (vs. Liverpool)	Manchester City	
April	(Denmark) Brian Sørensen	Everton	(England) Alessia Russo	Arsenal	(England) Ella Toone (vs. Leicester City)	Manchester United	

=== Annual awards ===
Award	Winner	Club
Barclays WSL Player of the Season	(Jamaica) Khadija Shaw	Manchester City
Barclays WSL Manager of the Season	(England) Matt Beard	Liverpool
Barclays WSL Goal of the Season	(England) Danielle Turner (vs. Manchester City)	Aston Villa
PFA Players' Player of the Year	(Jamaica) Khadija Shaw	Manchester City
PFA Young Player of the Year	(England) Grace Clinton	Tottenham Hotspur
FWA Footballer of the Year	(Jamaica) Khadija Shaw	Manchester City

PFA Team of the Year
Goalkeeper	(England) Khiara Keating (Manchester City)			
Defenders	(Spain) Laia Aleixandri (Manchester City)	(England) Lotte Wubben-Moy (Arsenal)	(England) Alex Greenwood (Manchester City)	(England) Niamh Charles (Chelsea)
Midfielders	(England) Grace Clinton (Tottenham Hotspur)		(Scotland) Erin Cuthbert (Chelsea)	(Japan) Yui Hasegawa (Manchester City)
Forwards	(England) Lauren James (Chelsea)		(Jamaica) Khadija Shaw (Manchester City)	(England) Lauren Hemp (Manchester City)
