= Filippa Angeldahl =

Swedish footballer (born 1997)

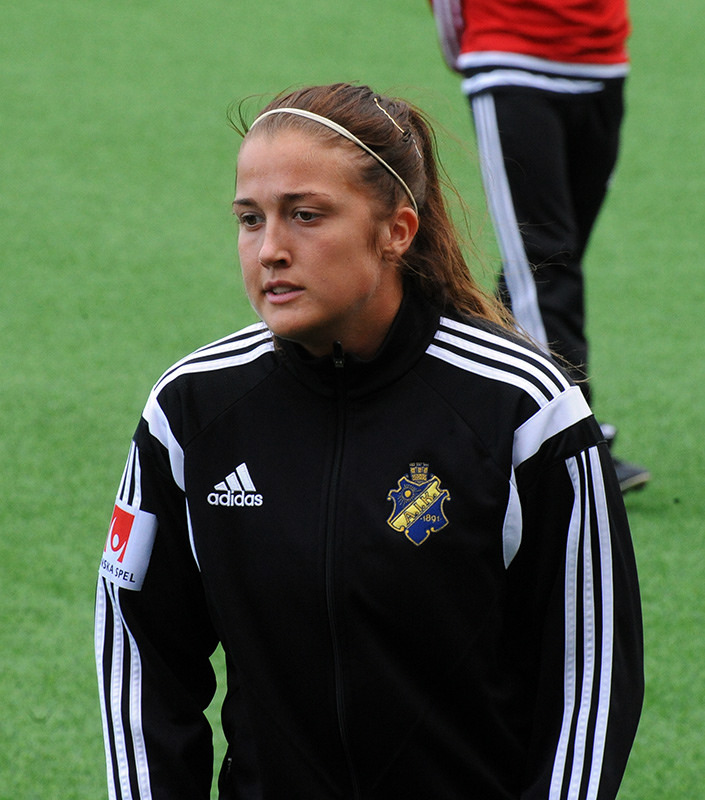
- Angeldahl with AIK in 2015

Personal information
- Full name: Ingrid Filippa Angeldahl
- Date of birth: 14 July 1997 (age 29)
- Place of birth: Uppsala, Sweden
- Height: 1.70 m (5 ft 7 in)
- Position: Midfielder

Team information
- Current team: Real Madrid
- Number: 16

Youth career
- Vaksala SK

Senior career*
Years	Team	Apps	(Gls)
2013	IK Sirius	13	(1)
2014–2015	AIK	36	(5)
2016–2017	Hammarby	47	(6)
2018–2019	Linköpings FC	38	(10)
2020–2021	BK Häcken	35	(3)
2021–2024	Manchester City	44	(2)
2024–	Real Madrid	54	(5)

International career^{‡}
2012	Sweden U15	2	(2)
2013	Sweden U17	11	(3)
2014–2016	Sweden U19	34	(6)
2016	Sweden U20	3	(0)
2019	Sweden U21	1	(1)
2017–2019	Sweden U23	22	(4)
2018–	Sweden	87	(24)
Medal record
Olympic Games
Silver medal – second place	2020 Tokyo
- * Club domestic league appearances and goals as of 31 August 2026 ‡ National team caps and goals as of 14 October 2026

Ingrid Filippa Angeldahl (Note: Her name has been frequently misspelt as Angeldal, because it was misspelt in her passport.) (born 14 July 1997) is a Swedish professional footballer who plays as a midfielder for Liga F club Real Madrid and the Sweden national team.

== Club career ==
Angeldahl started playing football together with her friend Nathalie Björn at the age of six when Angeldahl's father helped create Vaksala SK, a girls' team for their age. They beat everyone in their age group, teams two years older than them, and won a boys' league too. In 2013, Angeldahl joined Elitettan club IK Sirius, with which she scored once in 13 appearances over the season.

In 2014, together with Björn, Angeldahl joined AIK, who had been promoted back to the Damallsvenskan, quickly becoming consistent choices for the starting squad.

After AIK's relegation at the end of 2015 Damallsvenskan, In January 2016, Angeldahl signed with Hammarby, who were also relegated to the Elitettan. In October 2016, Angeldahl scored the decisive goal against Sundsvalls DFF to seal the club's promotion back to the Damallsvenskan with one round left to go. Her performances for Hammarby won her the 2017 Damallsvenskan Most Valuable Player award. Shortly afterwards she was transferred to League champions Linköping FC.

In 2020, Angeldahl joined Kopparbergs/Göteborg FC. In September 2020, she scored her first goal in a 2–0 victory over Djurgården. Two months later, she scored in the 7–0 victory over Linköping FC, securing the 2020 Damallsvenskan championship, marking the first time the club won the Swedish championship. In December 2020, while still celebrating the championship, the club dissolved, leaving Angeldahl without a club. However, in January 2021, BK Häcken invested in the club, making it their women's department and Angeldahl became a BK Häcken player.

On 2 September 2021, it was announced that Angeldahl had signed a two-year deal with the option of a further year with English Women's Super League side Manchester City. On 18 May 2024, it was announced that Angeldahl would leave the club upon the expiry of her contract.

On 1 July 2024, it was announced that she had signed for Liga F club Real Madrid. Her move to Real Madrid led to more playing time, and in December 2024, the Swedish Football Association awarded her the Midfielder of the Year award at Fotbollsgalan. Angeldahl became one of the most important players for Real Madrid and established herself as a consistent starter for the club. In her debut season, she made 44 appearances, the most by any player in the squad that season, and scored 5 goals in all competitions.

== International career ==
At the 2018 Algarve Cup, Angeldahl made her debut for the senior Sweden team, playing in fixtures against South Korea and Russia.

In July 2021, Angeldahl made her Olympic debut in the Women's football tournament of the 2020 Summer Olympics. She started the match against the United States, playing 75 minutes and receiving praise on television.

On 13 June 2023, she was included in the 23-player squad for the FIFA Women's World Cup 2023.

== Bandy career ==
As well as football, Angeldahl played bandy for IK Sirius, focusing on it as a teen with football being a summer sport for her. In 2013, Angeldahl was the topscorer of the Bandy World Championship G-17 which Sweden won. Two years later, she was one of the heroes of the under-19 team who won the 2015 European Championship.

== Personal life ==
In May 2024, Angeldahl became a mother, together with her partner Megan Brakes. They married in June 2026.

== Career statistics ==
=== Club ===
As of match played 5 May 2024

Appearances and goals by club, season and competition
Club	Season	League			National cup (Note: Includes Svenska Cupen Damer, Women's FA Cup, Copa de la Reina)		Continental		Other		Total	
Club	Season	Division	Apps	Goals	Apps	Goals	Apps	Goals	Apps	Goals	Apps	Goals
IK Sirius	2013	Elitettan	13	1	1	0	—		—		14	1
AIK FF	2014	Damallsvenskan	20	4	2	1	—		—		22	5
AIK FF	2015	Damallsvenskan	16	1	2	0	—		—		18	1
AIK FF	Total		36	5	4	1	—		—		54	6
Hammarby IF	2016	Elitettan	26	3	1	0	—		—		27	3
Hammarby IF	2017	Damallsvenskan	21	3	1	0	—		—		22	3
Hammarby IF	Total		47	6	2	0	—		—		49	6
Linköpings FC	2018	Damallsvenskan	22	7	5	1	2 (Note: Appearance(s) in UEFA Women's Champions League)	0	—		29	8
Linköpings FC	2019	Damallsvenskan	16	3	4	0	4	1	—		24	4
Linköpings FC	Total		38	10	9	1	6	1	—		53	12
BK Häcken FF	2020	Damallsvenskan	21	3	2	1	2	0	—		25	4
BK Häcken FF	2021	Damallsvenskan	14	0	5	4	1	2	—		20	6
BK Häcken FF	Total		35	3	7	5	3	2	—		45	10
Manchester City	2021–22	Women's Super League	15	0	4	1	0	0	4 (Note: Appearances in FA Women's League Cup)	1	23	2
Manchester City	2022–23	Women's Super League	16	2	3	1	0	0	6	2	25	5
Manchester City	2023–24	Women's Super League	13	0	2	0	—		5	1	20	1
Manchester City	Total		44	2	7	2	0	0	16	4	67	8
Real Madrid	2024–25	Liga F	28	4	4	0	10	0	2 (Note: Appearances in Supercopa de España)	1	44	5
Career total			228	20	33	9	19	3	18	5	312	47

=== International ===
As of match played 13 October 2026

Appearances and goals by national team and year
National team	Year	Apps	Goals
Sweden	2018	2	1
Sweden	2019	0	0
Sweden	2020	2	2
Sweden	2021	13	2
Sweden	2022	19	6
Sweden	2023	14	1
Sweden	2024	12	6
Sweden	2025	15	5
Sweden	2026	8	1
Total		87	24

Scores and results list Sweden's goal tally first, score column indicates score after each Angeldahl goal.

List of international goals scored by Filippa Angeldahl
No.	Date	Venue	Opponent	Score	Result	Competition
1	5 March 2018	Bela Vista Municipal Stadium, Parchal, Portugal	Russia	1–0	3–0	2018 Algarve Cup
2	1 December 2020	Anton Malatinský Stadium, Trnava, Slovakia	Slovakia	1–0	6–0	UEFA Women's Euro 2022 qualifying
3	1 December 2020	Anton Malatinský Stadium, Trnava, Slovakia	Slovakia	6–0	6–0	UEFA Women's Euro 2022 qualifying
4	19 February 2021	Tony Bezzina Stadium, Paola, Malta	Austria	4–1	6–1	Friendly
5	21 September 2021	Gamla Ullevi, Gothenburg, Sweden	Georgia	1–0	4–0	2023 FIFA Women's World Cup qualification
6	7 April 2022	Tengiz Burjanadze Stadium, Gori, Georgia	Georgia	2–0	15–0	2023 FIFA Women's World Cup qualification
7	7 April 2022	Tengiz Burjanadze Stadium, Gori, Georgia	Georgia	8–0	15–0	2023 FIFA Women's World Cup qualification
8	7 April 2022	Tengiz Burjanadze Stadium, Gori, Georgia	Georgia	10–0	15–0	2023 FIFA Women's World Cup qualification
9	17 July 2022	Leigh Sports Village, Leigh, England	Portugal	1–0	4–0	UEFA Women's Euro 2022
10	17 July 2022	Leigh Sports Village, Leigh, England	Portugal	2–0	4–0	UEFA Women's Euro 2022
11	11 October 2022	Gamla Ullevi, Gothenburg, Sweden	France	1–0	3–0	Friendly
12	11 August 2023	Eden Park, Auckland, New Zealand	Japan	2–0	2–1	2023 FIFA Women's World Cup
13	23 February 2024	Bosnia and Herzegovina FA Training Centre, Zenica, Bosnia and Herzegovina	Bosnia and Herzegovina	3–0	5–0	2023–24 UEFA Women's Nations League promotion/relegation matches
14	28 February 2024	Tele2 Arena, Stockholm, Sweden	Bosnia and Herzegovina	4–0	5–0	2023–24 UEFA Women's Nations League promotion/relegation matches
15	25 October 2024	Stade Émile Mayrisch, Esch-sur-Alzette, Luxembourg	Luxembourg	1–0	4–0	UEFA Women's Euro 2025 qualifying play-offs
16	29 October 2024	Gamla Ullevi, Gothenburg, Sweden	Luxembourg	1–0	8–0	UEFA Women's Euro 2025 qualifying play-offs
17	29 October 2024	Gamla Ullevi, Gothenburg, Sweden	Luxembourg	3–0	8–0	UEFA Women's Euro 2025 qualifying play-offs
18	3 December 2024	Tele2 Arena, Stockholm, Sweden	Serbia	1–0	6–0	UEFA Women's Euro 2025 qualifying play-offs
19	25 February 2024	Racecourse Ground, Wrexham, Wales	Wales	1–0	1–1	2025 UEFA Women's Nations League A
20	4 April 2025	Strawberry Arena, Solna, Sweden	Italy	2–1	3–2	2025 UEFA Women's Nations League A
21	3 June 2025	Strawberry Arena, Solna, Sweden	Denmark	3–0	6–1	2025 UEFA Women's Nations League A
22	26 June 2025	Ullevaal Stadion, Oslo, Norway	Norway	2–0	2–0	Friendly
23	5 July 2025	Stade de Genève, Geneva, Switzerland	Denmark	1–0	1–0	UEFA Women's Euro 2025
24	3 March 2026	Stadio Oreste Granillo, Reggio Calabria, Italy	Italy	1–0	1–0	2027 FIFA Women's World Cup qualification

== Honours ==
Manchester City

- Women's League Cup: 2021–22

Sweden

- Summer Olympic Games: Silver Medal 2020
- Algarve Cup: 2018

Individual

- Primera División Team of the Year: 2024–25
