= Brighton & Hove Albion W.F.C. =

Women's football club from Brighton, England

Brighton & Hove Albion
- Full name: Brighton & Hove Albion Women Football Club
- Nicknames: The Seagulls, The Albion
- Short name: Brighton
- Founded: 1967; 59 years ago as Brighton GPO; 1990; 36 years ago as BHAFC
- Stadium: Broadfield Stadium; Falmer Stadium (Selected games)
- Capacity: 6,135 (Broadfield Stadium); 32,176 (Falmer Stadium)
- Coordinates: 51°5′59″N 0°11′41″W; Broadfield Stadium
- Owner: Tony Bloom
- Managing Director: Zoe Johnson
- Head Coach: Arturo Ruiz
- League: Women's Super League
- 2025–26: WSL, 7th of 12
- Website: brightonandhovealbion.com/women
Home colours	Away colours	Third colours

Brighton & Hove Albion Women Football Club, commonly referred to as Brighton, is an English women's football club affiliated with Brighton & Hove Albion. The club currently competes in the Women's Super League and the first team play at the Broadfield Stadium, home of Crawley Town F.C.

== History ==
Originally founded as Brighton GPO (General Post Office) in 1967 after it was created by workers at the Post Office's telephone exchange. Two years later the club were one of the founding six members of the Women's Sussex Martlet League in 1969 which coincided with the formation of the Women's Football Association.

The club finished runners-up to Manchester City at the 2026 Women's FA Cup final, the club's best result at a Women's FA Cup. However, a Brighton & Hove Albion side run by a supporters group did reach the 1976 play-off final, when they finished in third place after winning 6–0 against Belle Vue Belles. However, that side disbanded shortly afterwards. In 1979, a sponsorship deal with local sports retailer Clapshaw and Cleave Sports was secured, where player Julie Hemsley worked, leading to the club being renamed as C&C Sports from the 1979–80 season.

=== Affiliation with the Albion ===
The women's team were formally adopted by the men's club in 1990 and became known as Brighton & Hove Albion Women & Girls FC after a footballing restructure. The new club than became founding members of South East Counties Women's League, which was established from the Sussex Martlet League and other Kent and Surrey clubs who entered the Southern Premier Division 1991–92.

In the late nineties, the women's team narrowly missed out on promotion to the National Premier Division three seasons in-a-row by finishing in second place. On the fourth attempt, the women's side finally won Premier Southern Division in 2000–01, completing a remarkable double promotion for both the men's and women's teams. The women were to remain in the Women's Premier League National Division for two seasons before they were relegated at the end of the 2002–03 season and would not return to the top flight until after the formation of the Women's Super League.

=== The Tony Bloom years ===
Eleven years later, the club set out a five-year plan to reach the top of the WSL and UEFA Women's Champions League qualification. In the 2014–15 season, the team missed out on promotion to WSL 2 by finishing runners-up to Portsmouth but came back stronger the following season to become champions of Premier Southern Division and setup a National Premier Play-off final against Premier Northern Division winners Sporting Club Albion. Following the club's victory in the play-offs, Albion's promotion to the FA WSL 2 was confirmed.

Following an announcement that the season would move to a new calendar, starting in autumn 2017, the scheduling of women's football matches would be played alongside the traditional football calendar, from September to May each season.

This created a 14-month gap between the end of the 2015–16 season and September 2017, and to bridge this gap a shortened WSL Spring Series was to be played between February and May. The club competed in the FA WSL 2 Spring Series playing all of their matches at Culver Road. Alessia Russo scored the clubs first professional goal at this level.

The club eventually began their 2017–18 WSL 2 season, beating Aston Villa 1–0 on the first day of the winter campaign where the team would go on to finish runners-up to Doncaster Rovers Belles. However, Albion were to be promoted to the FA WSL 1, the top tier of women's football in England, for the 2018–19 season after Doncaster gave up their licence to play in the top tier and were subsequently relegated to Premier Northern Division. After Brighton were awarded a tier 1 licence, the club revealed they would relocate their home games to Crawley Town's Broadfield Stadium for women's first team matches.

=== Top tier status (2018–present) ===
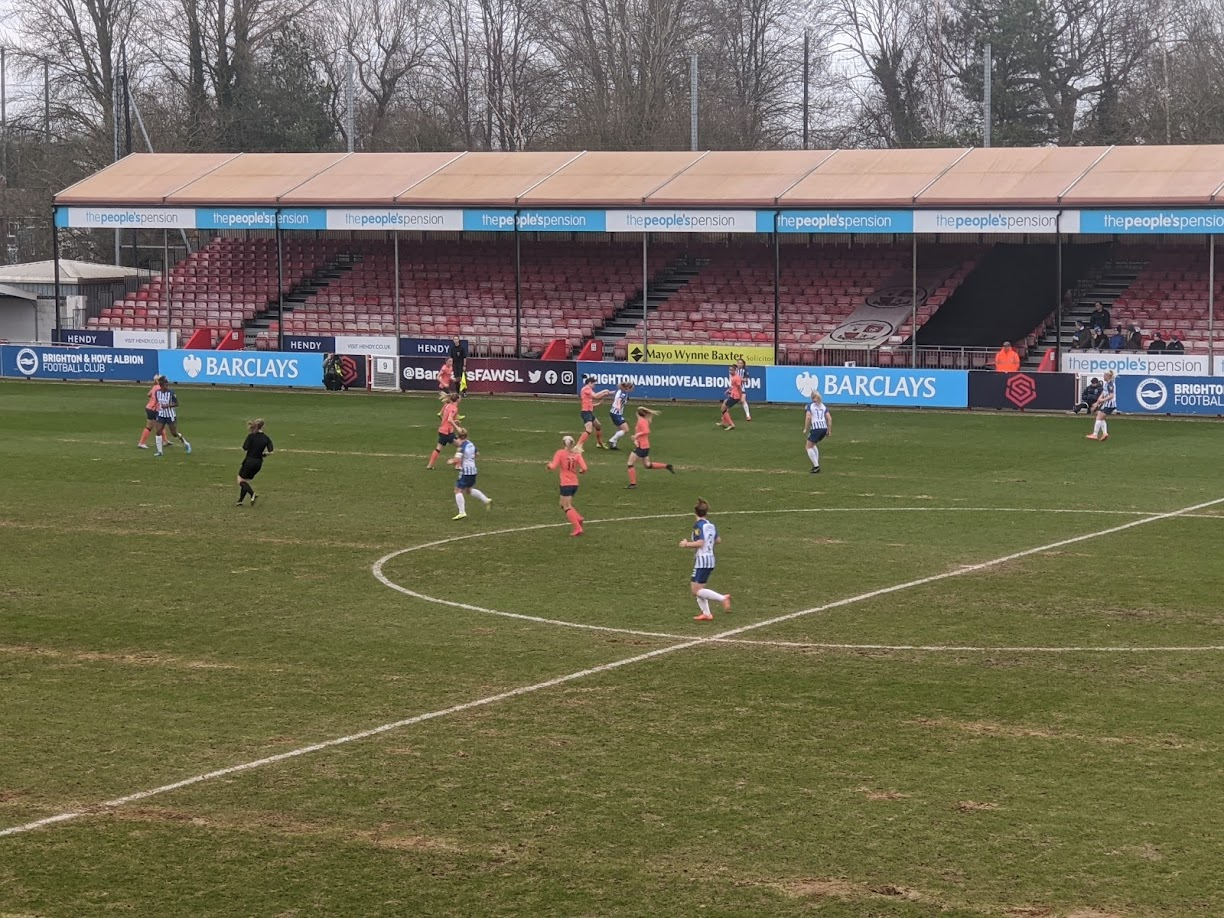
Brighton & Hove Albion playing a game of football at Broadfield Stadium

Albion's first season in the top tier of the Women's Super League saw them finish ninth in what was then an 11 team league, finishing 19 points clear of relegated Yeovil Town. Hope Powell's team secured four wins from their 20 league matches, while Ellie Brazil finished as top scorer with four goals. Their first WSL win came in a 2–1 home win over Yeovil Town, with Jodie Brett and Victoria Williams getting on the scoresheet.

The 2019–20 season was curtailed with four games left to play due to the outbreak of the COVID-19 pandemic, with Albion again finishing in ninth place in the WSL. Aileen Whelan finished as top scorer that campaign with five league goals, while Albion drew in their second league game of the season against Chelsea, becoming just one of three sides who took a point off the eventual champions.

Powell would lead her side to their highest placed finish in the WSL in the 2020–21 season, finishing in sixth place. An opening day victory against Birmingham City marked one of just two victories Albion enjoyed in the league until February, before going on run that saw them win six of their last nine matches. That included a 2–1 victory over Chelsea, that ended their run of 33 matches unbeaten in league football. Summer signing Inessa Kaagman finished as top scorer with nine goals in all competitions, as they also recorded notable victories over Tottenham Hotspur and Manchester United.

== Stadium ==
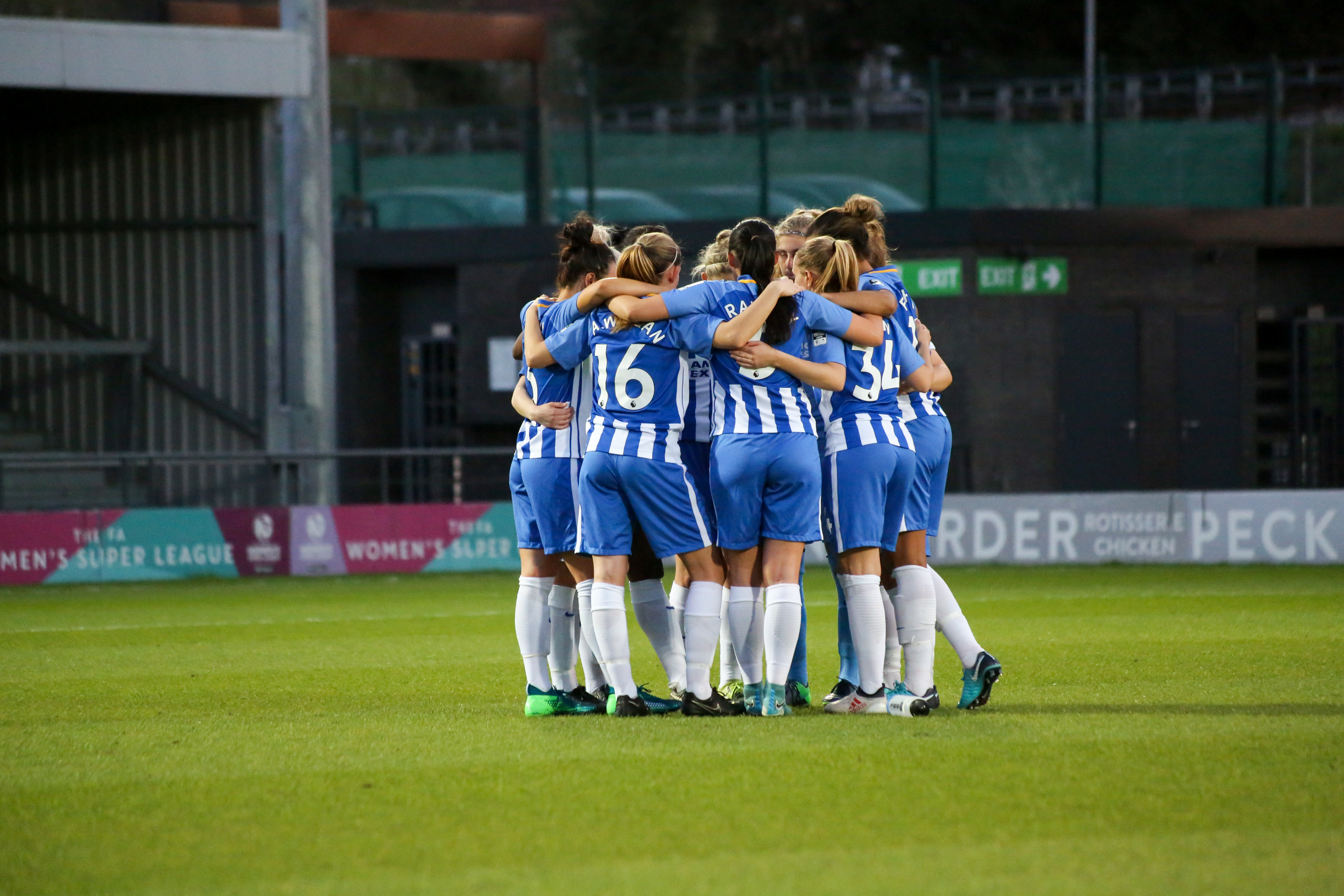
Brighton & Hove Albion team in April 2018

=== Early years to the Goldstone ===
During the earlier days, the women's team lived a nomadic existence without a permanent home ground because of the football association ban on women's football. From the 1970s, the team heavily relied on public parks and recreation grounds including Buckingham Park and Waterhall. When the women's team affiliated with the men's club and begun to enter the football league structure, the club utilised several local venues across Sussex including Sussex University, Southwick F.C. and East Preston. Before the club was forced to sell the Goldstone Ground, the traditional spiritual home of the Albion, the women's team played three matches there against Milton Keynes, Horsham and Whitehawk.

=== A home away from home ===
For a period of time, the club played home fixtures at Nyewood Lane in Bognor Regis from when the club were in the top-flight between 2001 and 2003. When the men's team left Withdean Stadium for the newly built American Express Community Stadium in Falmer, the club briefly brought the women's team back to Brighton by playing a couple of seasons at the Withdean athletics track ground before they relocated again to the official headquarters of the Sussex County Football Association at Culver Road in Lancing from the 2014–15 season. Their last game at Culver Road was in 2018 when the club could not meet the strict capacity and infrastructure requirements mandated by the FA Women's Super League.

=== Broadfield Stadium ===
To comply with the fully professional licensing criteria of the WSL, the club relocated to Broadfield Stadium in Crawley from the 2018–19 season to the present day. Sharing the ground with Crawley Town F.C. provided the women's team with professional-grade media facilities. The club also showcases select high-profile matches at the American Express Stadium.

=== Returning to Brighton permanently ===
In April 2026, the club announced plans to bring the women's team back to Brighton and Hove by constructing the UK and Europe's first purpose-built stadium for women's football. The club aims to open the new ground for the 2030–31 season which is subject to planning permission with Brighton & Hove City Council and Lewes District Council. The new 10,000-seater stadium will be built on Bennett's Field, next to the men's stadium and connected by a new bridge walkway that will link to an underground car park for players and staff.

== The Seagulls nickname ==
The women's team is officially known as the Seagulls, a nickname shared with the men's team, although there is a play on the word with Shegulls, the first official supporters' club that primarily promotes the women's team. Historically, the club has a connection to the martlet, a charge from English heraldry which appears on the Sussex flag. There is no official recognition of the martlet associated with the women's team other than the Sussex Martlet League, which was the league the women's team competed in prior to the founding of the Southern Premier Division.

== Players and staff ==
=== Current squad ===
As of 1 September 2026

Note: Flags indicate national team as defined under FIFA eligibility rules; some limited exceptions apply. Players may hold more than one non-FIFA nationality.

No.	Pos.	Nation	Player
2	DF	COL	Manuela Vanegas
3	DF	JPN	Moeka Minami
5	DF	FRA	Maelys Mpomé
6	DF	ENG	Gabby George
7	FW	TAN	Aisha Masaka
8	MF	ENG	Maisie Symonds (captain)
9	FW	USA	Madison Haley
10	MF	SRB	Jelena Čanković
11	FW	JPN	Kiko Seike
13	MF	SUI	Lia Wälti
14	MF	ENG	Fran Kirby
15	MF	NOR	Emilie Joramo
16	GK	NGR	Chiamaka Nnadozie
17	MF	ENG	Bex Rayner

No.	Pos.	Nation	Player
18	DF	IRL	Caitlin Hayes
19	DF	NED	Marisa Olislagers
20	MF	NOR	Olaug Tvedten
21	FW	USA	Olivia García
23	DF	NED	Marit Auée
25	GK	ENG	Hannah Poulter
27	MF	ENG	Sophie Peskett
28	GK	GER	Melina Loeck
30	GK	ENG	Eleanor Heeps
33	DF	AUS	Charlie Rule
35	FW	IRL	Emily Murphy
41	MF	ENG	Taylor Warren
44	FW	POL	Nadia Krezyman
64	MF	ENG	Emilie Gay

=== Out on loan ===
Note: Flags indicate national team as defined under FIFA eligibility rules; some limited exceptions apply. Players may hold more than one non-FIFA nationality.

No.	Pos.	Nation	Player
22	FW	ESP	Carla Camacho (at Lazio until 30 June 2027)
29	FW	JPN	Fuka Tsunoda (at Crystal Palace until 30 June 2027)
—	FW	ENG	Lily Dent (at Sunderland until 30 June 2027)
—	FW	ENG	Olivia Johnson (at Lewes until 30 June 2027)
—	DF	ENG	Grace McEwen (at Nottingham Forest until 30 June 2027)
—	DF	ENG	Jess Pegram (at Hammarby until 30 June 2027)

=== Under-19s ===
As of 18 October 2026

Players who were featured in a senior matchday squad, in all competitions, for the 2026–27 season Note: Flags indicate national team as defined under FIFA eligibility rules; some limited exceptions apply. Players may hold more than one non-FIFA nationality.

No.	Pos.	Nation	Player
41	MF	ENG	Taylor Warren
64	MF	ENG	Emilie Gay

=== Former players ===
For details of current and former players with a Wikipedia article, see Category:Brighton & Hove Albion W.F.C. players.

== Management team ==
Position	Name
Head coach	(Spain) Arturo Ruiz
Assistant coach	(Spain) Fernando Torres
First team coach	(England) Arthur Brammer
First team goalkeeping coach	(England) Nikita Runnacles
First team goalkeeping coach	(Australia) Ben Morella
U19's head coach	(England) Danielle Bowman
Scouting & Intelligence	(England) Georgina Nielsen
Physiotherapist	(England) Rachel Doyle
Lead performance analyst	(England) Mollie Derhun
Club doctor	(England) Dr. Bethany Koh
Kit & equipment manager	(England) Tim Capstick

=== Managerial history ===
- (England) Alf Waller 1970–1971
- (England) Roger Ockenden 1975–1976
- (England) John Hewitt 1980
- (England) Tony Tregear 2012–2013
- (England) Jay Lovett 2013
- (England) John Donoghue 2014
- (England) James Marrs 2014–2016
- (England) George Parris 2016–2017
- (England) Hope Powell 2017–2022
- (Germany) Jens Scheuer 2022–2023
- (United States) Melissa Phillips 2023–2024
- (England) Mikey Harris 2024
- (Australia) Dario Vidošić 2024–2026
- (Spain) Arturo Ruiz 2026–

== Club honours ==
=== League competitions ===
- WSL 2
  - Runners-up (1): 2018^{†}

^{†} _{Promoted to WSL after club was granted Tier 1 licence.}

- National Premier Play-Off Final
  - Winners (1): 2016

=== Cup competitions ===
- Women's FA Cup
  - Runners-up (1): 2026
  - Third place (1): 1978

=== Regional competitions ===
- Premier League Southern Division^{✽}
  - Winners (2): 2000-01, 2015–16
  - Runners-up (4): 1996–97, 1997–98, 1999–00, 2014–15
- Martlet League
  - Winners (3): 1972–73, 1973–74, 1974–75
- Martlet League Cup
  - Winners (3): 1972–73, 1973–74, 1974–75
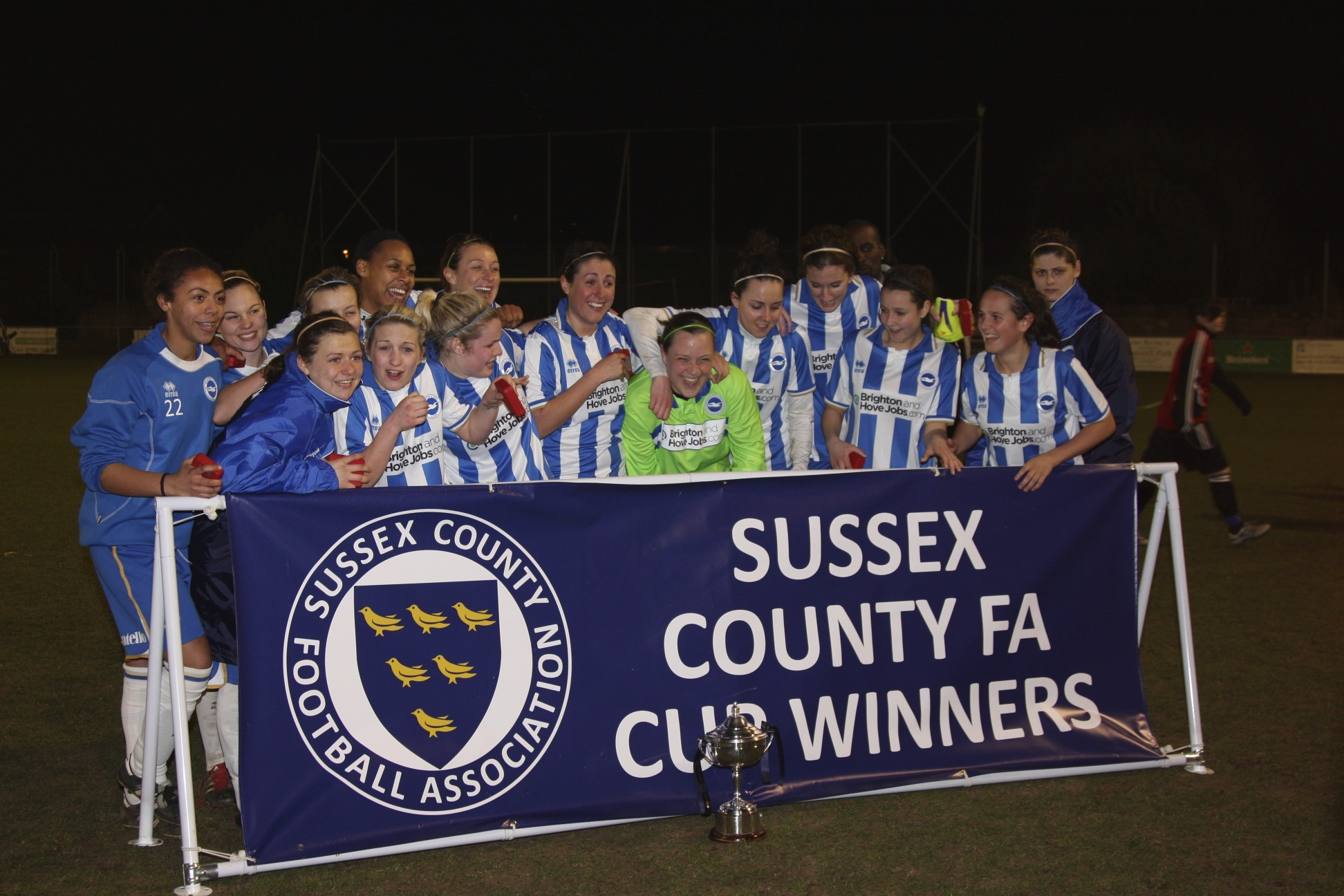
    Brighton & Hove Albion after winning the Sussex County Cup in 2012
- Sussex Women's Challenge Cup
  - Winners (19): 1995, 1998, 2000, 2001, 2002, 2003, 2004, 2005, 2006, 2007, 2008, 2010, 2012, 2013, 2015, 2016, 2017, 2022, 2023

^{✽} _{Club joined Southern Premier Division as a founding member in 1991–92}

=== Minor competitions ===
- Sussex Women's Challenge Trophy
  - Winners (2): 2002^{†2}, 2010^{†3}
- Woodingdean Carnival Cup
  - Winners (1): 1973

=== Notable mentions ===
- Women's Super League
  - Manager of the Month: February 2021, October 2024
- The FA Women's Awards
  - Club of the Year: 2016

^{†2} _{Club entered as Bighton & Hove Albion Women Development Squad} ^{†3} _{Club entered as Albion Community}

== See also ==
- Football in Sussex
