= Women's Super League Golden Glove =

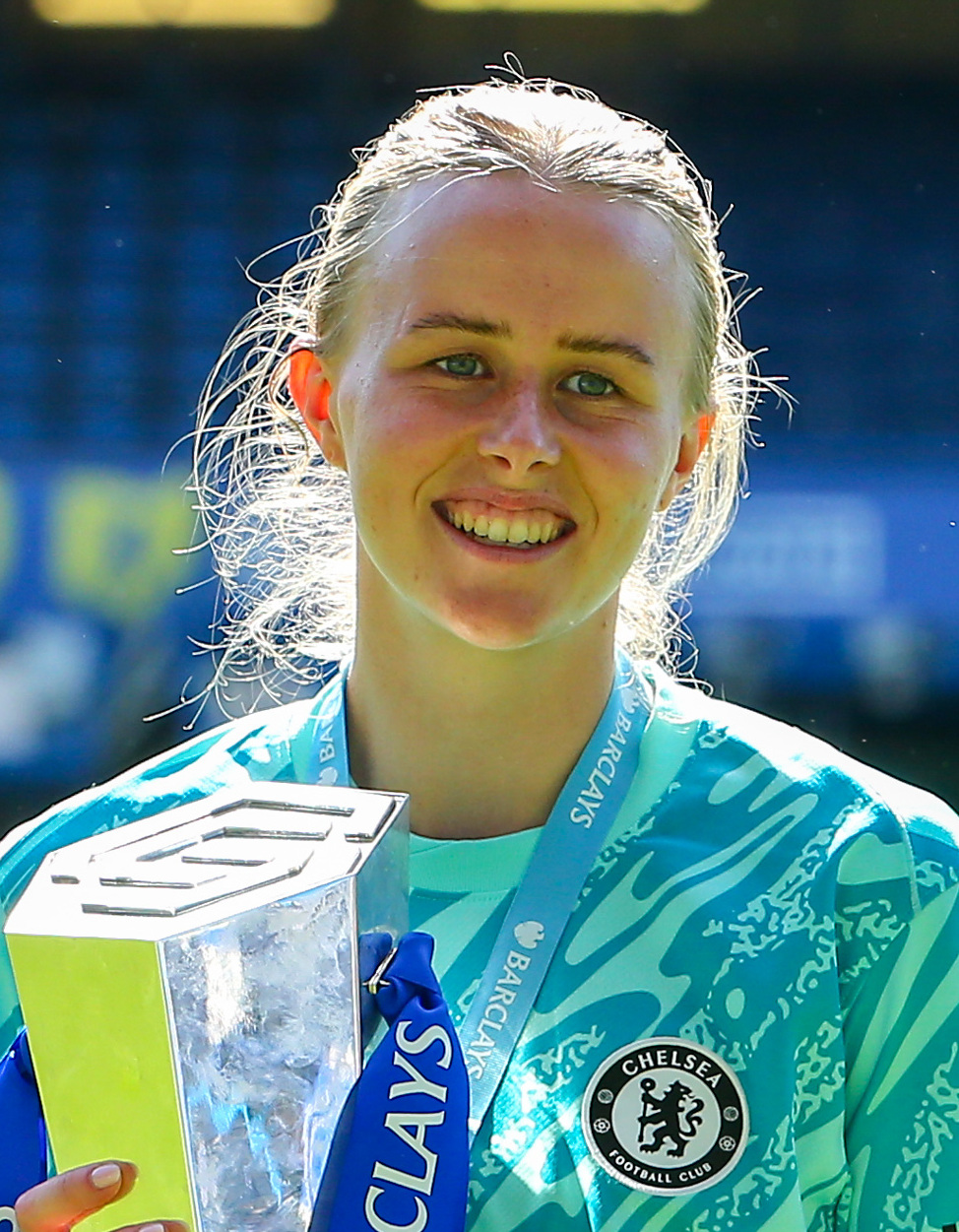
- Hannah Hampton is the current holder of the award
- Awarded for: The most clean sheets in a given Women's Super League season
- Sponsored by: Barclays
- Country: England
- Presented by: Women's Super League
- First award: 2019
- Currently held by: Hannah Hampton (2nd title)

Highlights
- Most awards: Hannah Hampton (2)
- Most number of clean sheets: 14 (Mary Earps; 2022–23)

The Women's Super League Golden Glove is an annual association football award presented to the goalkeeper who has kept the most clean sheets in the Women's Super League. In football a team's defense or goalkeeper may be said to "keep a clean sheet" if they prevent their opponents from scoring any goals during an entire match. For sponsorship purposes, it has been referred to as the Barclays WSL Golden Glove since its inception during the 2019–20 season.

In 2020, the inaugural Women's Super League Golden Glove was awarded to Ellie Roebuck of Manchester City.

== Winners ==
Key
Player (X)	Name of the player and number of times they had won the award at that point (if more than one)
†	Indicates multiple award winners in the same season
‡	Denotes the club were Women's Super League champions in the same season

Women's Super League Golden Glove winners
Season	Player	Nationality	Club	Clean sheets	Ref(s)
2019–20	Ellie Roebuck	England	Manchester City	10	
2020–21	Ann-Katrin Berger	Germany	Chelsea‡	12	
2021–22	Manuela Zinsberger	Austria	Arsenal	13	
2022–23	Mary Earps	England	Manchester United	14	
2023–24	Khiara Keating	England	Manchester City	9	
2024–25†	Hannah Hampton	England	Chelsea‡	13	
2024–25†	Phallon Tullis-Joyce	United States	Manchester United	13	
2025–26	Hannah Hampton	England	Chelsea	8	

== Awards won by nationality ==
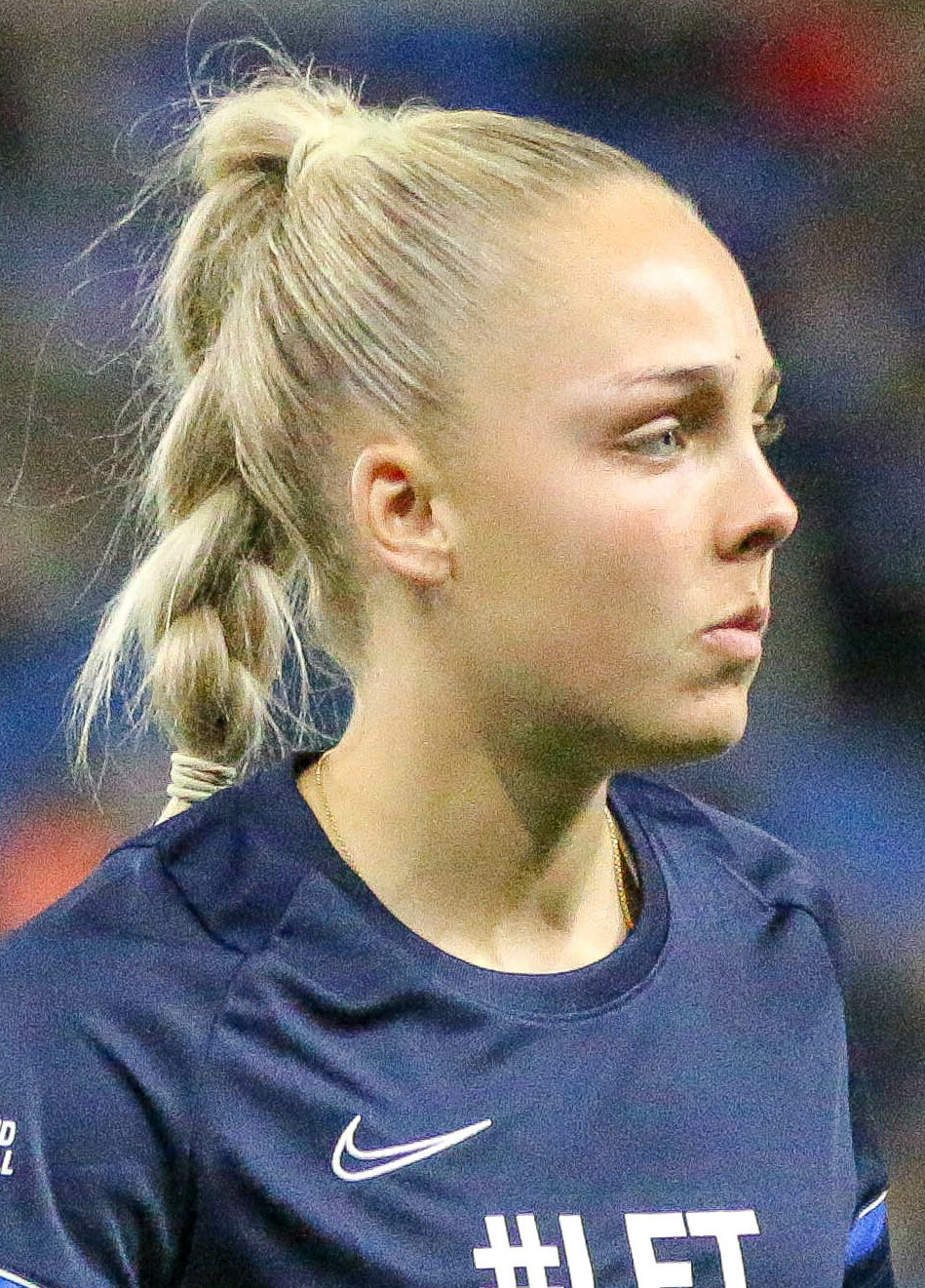
Ellie Roebuck won the inaugural Women's Super League Golden Glove in 2019.

Country	Players	Total
England	5	5
Austria	1	1
Germany	1	1
United States	1	1

== Awards won by club ==
Club	Players	Total
Chelsea	3	3
Manchester City	2	2
Manchester United	2	2
Arsenal	1	1

== See also ==
- Women's Super League Player of the Season
- Women's Super League Save of the Month
- Women's Super League Golden Boot
