= Women's Super League Save of the Month =

Association football award

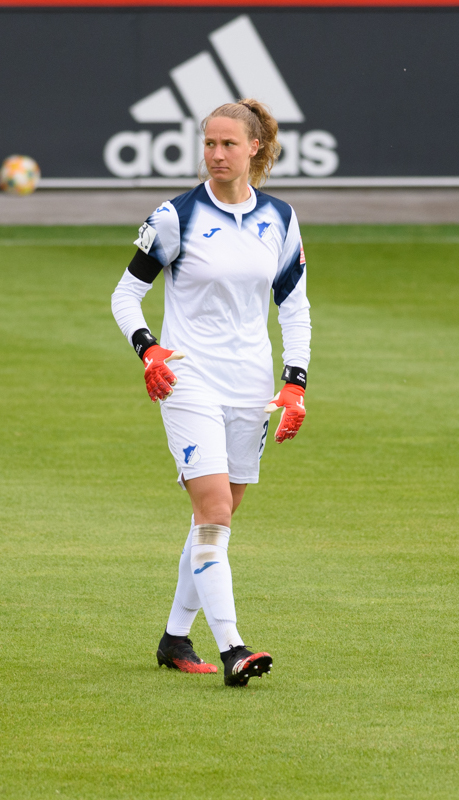
Janina Leitzig was the first player to win the award.

The Women's Super League Save of the Month is a monthly association football award presented to players in England, that recognises the goalkeeper deemed to have made the best Women's Super League save in each month of the season from August to April.

== Winners ==
Key
Italics	Home team

Month	Year	Nationality	Player	Team	Score	Opponents	Date	Ref.
2025–26 Women's Super League
September	2025	Germany	Janina Leitzig	Leicester City	0–1	Chelsea	21 September 2025	
October	2025	Netherlands	Daphne van Domselaar	Arsenal	1–0	Brighton & Hove Albion	12 October 2025	
November	2025	Nigeria	Chiamaka Nnadozie	Brighton & Hove Albion	1–1	Liverpool	9 November 2025	
December	2025	Spain	Elene Lete	London City Lionesses	0–1	Brighton & Hove Albion	7 December 2025	
January	2025	Germany	Anneke Borbe	Arsenal	0–0	Manchester United	10 January 2026	
February	2026	Japan	Ayaka Yamashita	Manchester City	5–1	Chelsea	1 February 2026	
March	2026	England	Daphne van Domselaar (2)	Arsenal	5–2	Tottenham Hotspur	8 March 2026	

1. Player's team's score listed first.

== Multiple winners ==
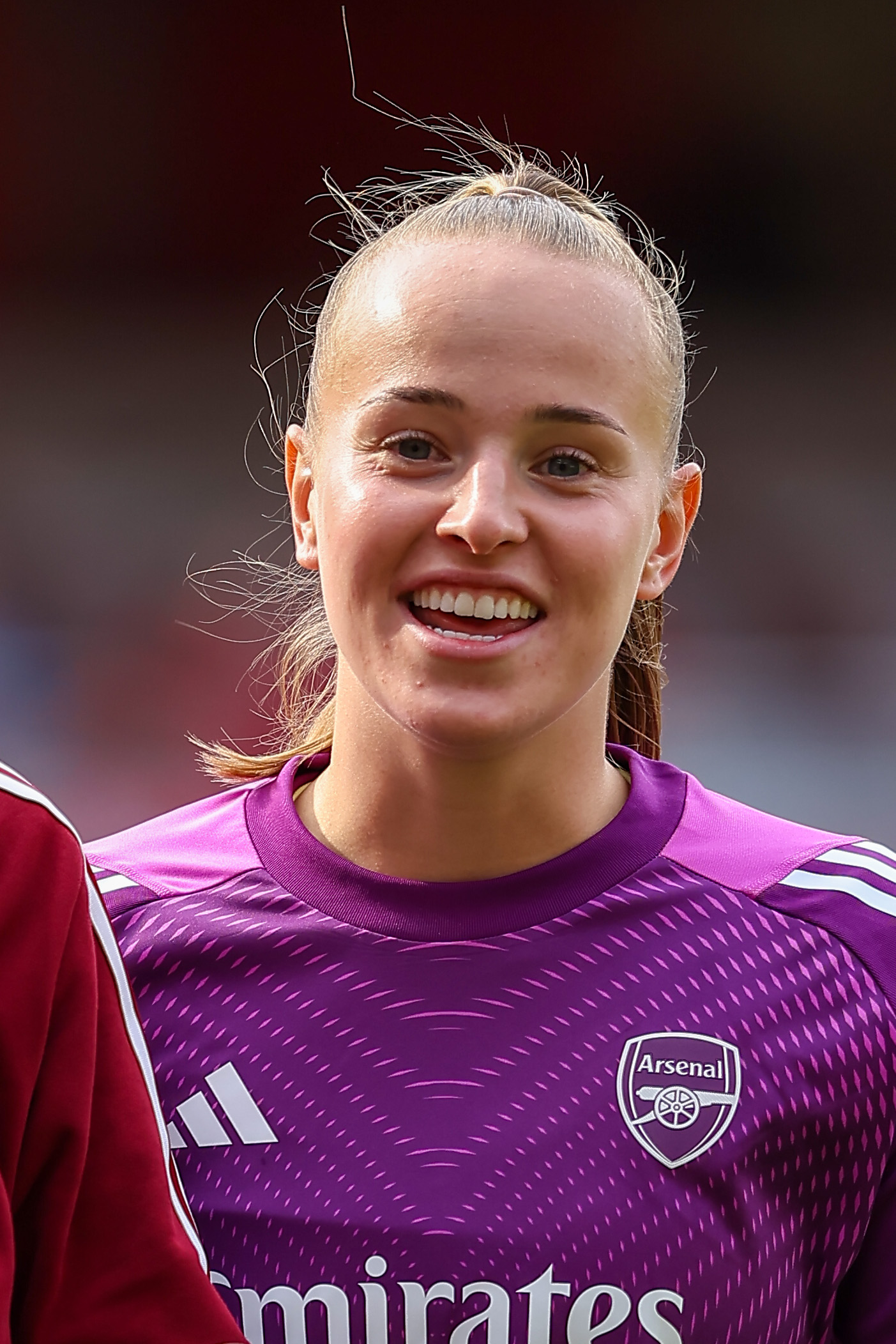
Daphne van Domselaar is the first player to have won the award multiple times.

As of March 2026 awardThe following table lists the number of awards won by players who have won at least two Save of the Month awards.

Players in bold are still active in the Premier League.

Rank	Player	Wins
1st	(Netherlands) **Daphne van Domselaar**	2

== Awards won by club ==
As of March 2026 award

Club	Players	Wins
Arsenal	2	3
Leicester City	1	1
Brighton & Hove Albion	1	1
London City Lionesses	1	1
Manchester City	1	1

== See also ==
- Women's Super League Player of the Season
- Women's Super League Golden Boot
