= Chiamaka Nnadozie =

Nigerian footballer (born 2000)

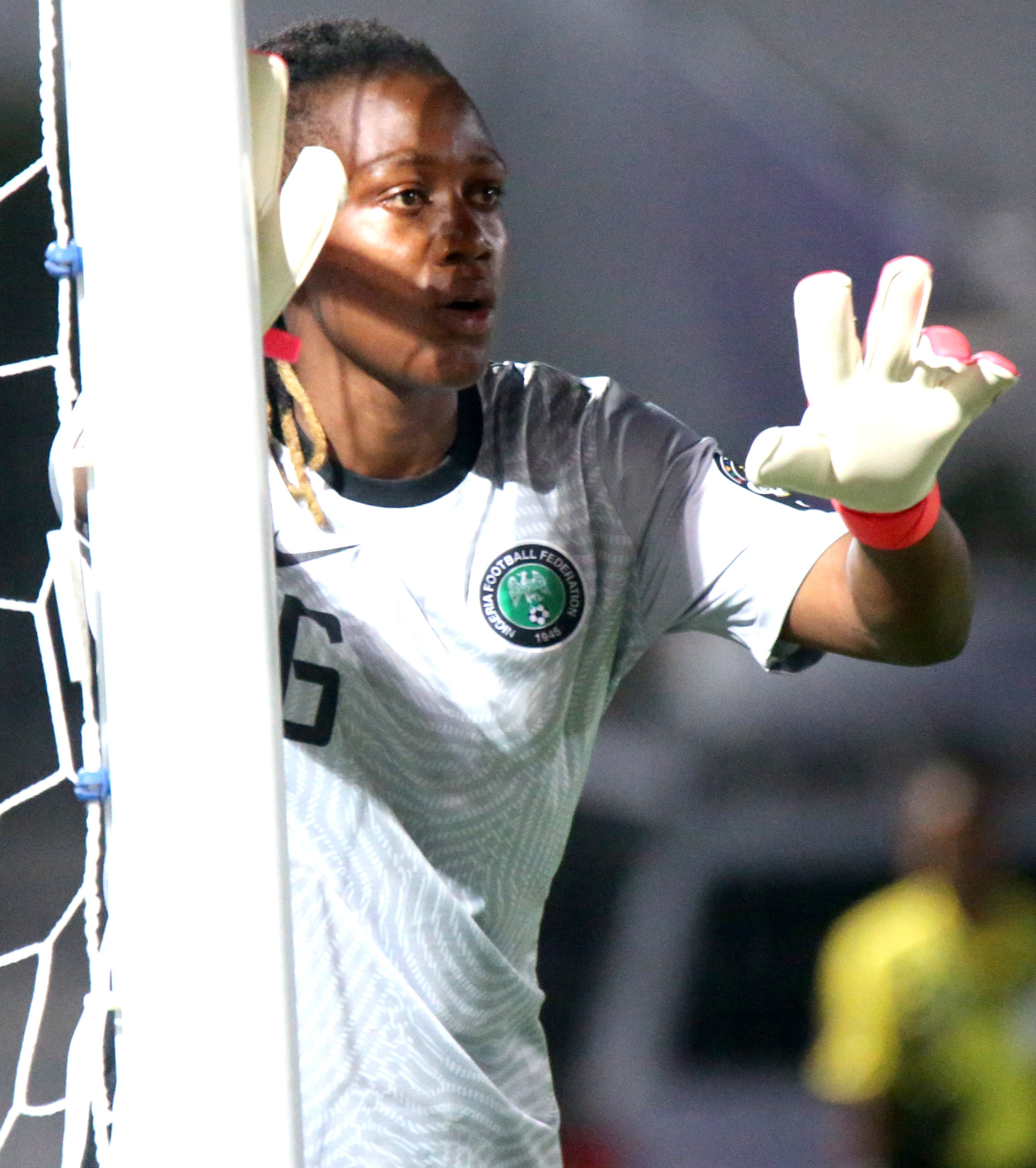
- Nnadozie with Nigeria in 2022

Personal information
- Full name: Chiamaka Cynthia Nnadozie
- Date of birth: 8 December 2000 (age 25)
- Place of birth: Orlu, Imo State, Nigeria
- Height: 1.80 m (5 ft 11 in)
- Position: Goalkeeper

Team information
- Current team: Brighton & Hove Albion
- Number: 16

Senior career*
Years	Team	Apps	(Gls)
2016–2020	Rivers Angels		
2020–2025	Paris FC	97	(0)
2025–	Brighton & Hove Albion	29	(0)

International career^{‡}
2016–2018	Nigeria U-17	3	(0)
2018	Nigeria U-20	4	(0)
2018–	Nigeria	66	(0)
- * Club domestic league appearances and goals as of 22 November 2026 ‡ National team caps and goals as of 15 August 2026

Chiamaka Cynthia Nnadozie OON (Igbo: [tʃi.aˈma.ka ˈsɪn.θi.ə nːa.dò.zi.ɛ]; born 8 December 2000) is a Nigerian footballer who plays as a goalkeeper for Brighton & Hove Albion in the Women's Super League and the Nigeria women's national team. Nnadozie was named African best female goalkeeper of the year three times in a row in 2023, 2024 and 2025, making her the first player to achieve this. She was also ranked fourth at the 2025 Yashin Trophy and has been regarded as one of the best female footballers in the world by The Guardian.

== Club career ==
=== Rivers Angels FC ===
At the start of the 2016 season Nnadozie signed for Rivers Angels a top flight Nigerian professional football club based in Port Harcourt, Rivers State in Nigeria. In 2019 Nnadozie was instrumental for Rivers Angels 2019–2020 Season NWPL league win.

=== Paris FC ===
On 22 January 2020 she signed for the French side Paris FC on 18-month deal. Arriving at Paris FC from River Angels FC, Chiamaka Nnadozie immediately became a key part of the team. Named Arkema Premier League's best goalkeeper in 2023–24 Division 1 Féminine, she left Paris FC after a magnificent victory in the Coupe de France, in which she played a key role. She made 16 European appearances for Paris FC between 2022 and 2025.

=== Brighton & Hove Albion ===
On 27 June 2025, it was announced that Nnadozie would be joining The Seagulls from 1 July 2025 when her contract with Paris FC expires, subject to the usual regulatory processes.

== International career ==
During the 2018 FIFA U-20 Women's World Cup Nnadozie played all four matches. Against Haiti she received the "Dare to Shine" Player of the Match award for her good performance. Not much after the U-20 Tournament she was also selected for the 2018 Africa Women Cup of Nations where she stayed on the bench for all five matches, then at the 2019 Women WAFU Cup she was in goal for the Super Falcons spectacular performance.

At age 19, Nnadozie was named to the senior national team (commonly known as the Super Falcons) to compete at the 2019 FIFA Women's World Cup in France. As Nigeria's starting goalkeeper in the team's 2–0 victory over Korea, Nnadozie became the youngest goalkeeper to keep a clean sheet at the World Cup.

After the World Cup, Nnadozie again helped the Falconets to gold medal at the African Games in Morocco saving three penalties in the shootout against Cameroon.

On 16 June 2023, she was included in the 23-player Nigerian squad for the FIFA Women's World Cup 2023. In the first game of the Women's World Cup against Olympic champions Canada, Nnadozie was the captain for the Super Falcons. She made three saves, including stopping a 50th-minute penalty from Christine Sinclair. Her performances in the game secured a goalless draw for the Super Falcons, earned herself a Player of the Match award and garnered international attention.

Nnadozie was called up to the Nigeria squad for the 2024 Summer Olympics.

On 20 June 2025, Nnadozie was named in the final Nigeria squad for the 2024 Women's Africa Cup of Nations WAFCON, taking place from 5 to 27 July 2025. Placed in Group B their matches are against Tunisia, Botswana and Algeria.

She was part of the Nigerian women national team squad that won the 2025 Women's Africa Cup of Nations and was the best goal keeper of the tournament. Subsequently, she was awarded the national honour Officer of the Order of the Niger.

== Career statistics ==
=== Club ===
As of match played 22 November 2026.

Appearances and goals by club, season and competition
Club	Season	League			National Cup		League Cup		Continental		Total	
Club	Season	Division	Apps	Goals	Apps	Goals	Apps	Goals	Apps	Goals	Apps	Goals
Rivers Angels	2016–20	NWFL Premiership										
Paris FC	2020–21	Division 1 Féminine	15	0	0	0	—		0	0	15	0
Paris FC	2021–22	Division 1 Féminine	22	0	0	0	—		0	0	22	0
Paris FC	2022–23	Division 1 Féminine	21	0	0	0	—		2 (Note: Appearances in UEFA Women's Champions League)	0	23	0
Paris FC	2023–24	Division 1 Féminine	20	0	0	0	—		10	0	30	0
Paris FC	2024–25	Première Ligue	19	0	3 (Note: Appearances in Coupe de France Féminine)	0	—		4	0	26	0
Paris FC	Total		97	0	3	0	—		16	0	116	0
Brighton & Hove Albion	2025–26	WSL	18	0	4	0	0	0	—		22	0
Brighton & Hove Albion	2026–27	WSL	11	0	0	0	1	0	—		12	0
Brighton & Hove Albion	Total		29	0	4	0	1	0	—		34	0
Career total			126	0	7	0	1	0	16	0	150	0

== Honours ==
Rivers Angels

- Nigerian Women's Championship: 2016
- Nigerian Women's Cup: 2016, 2017, 2018

Paris FC

- Coupe de France Féminine: 2024–25

Nigeria

- Women's Africa Cup of Nations: 2018, 2024
- African Games: 2019

Individual

- Women's Africa Cup of Nations Best Goalkeeper: 2024
- Women's Africa Cup of Nations Team of the Tournament: 2024
- CAF Goalkeeper of the Year (Women): 2023, 2024 2025
- D1 Arkema Goalkeeper of the Season: 2023–24
- IFFHS Africa's Best Woman Goalkeeper: 2019
- EaglesTracker Goalkeeper of the Season: 2022, 2023, 2024
- UNFP Première Ligue team of the year: 2023–24
- LFFP Première Ligue team of the season: 2023–24
- Ranked fourth place in the 2025 women's Yashin Trophy
- The Guardian 100 best female footballers in the world 2025
- Women's Super League Save of the Month: November 2025

Orders

- Officer of the Order of the Niger
