= Nadia Krezyman =

Polish association football player

Personal information
- Date of birth: 22 June 2004 (age 22)
- Place of birth: Poznań, Poland
- Height: 1.66 m (5 ft 5 in)
- Position: Forward

Team information
- Current team: Brighton & Hove Albion
- Number: 44

Youth career
- –2017: Błękitni Owińska
- 2017–2019: UKS SMS Łódź

Senior career*
Years	Team	Apps	(Gls)
2019–2021	UKS SMS Łódź III	5	(9)
2020–2024	UKS SMS Łódź	67	(15)
2024–2026	Dijon	37	(8)
2026–	Brighton & Hove Albion	3	(0)

International career^{‡}
2018–2019	Poland U15	5	(0)
2019–2020	Poland U17	8	(4)
2021–2022	Poland U19	14	(2)
2024	Poland U23	3	(1)
2023–	Poland	20	(3)
- * Club domestic league appearances and goals as of 22 November 2026 ‡ National team caps and goals as of 21:05, 9 June 2026 (UTC)

Nadia Krezyman (born 22 June 2004) is a Polish professional footballer who plays as a forward for Women's Super League club Brighton & Hove Albion and the Poland national team.

== Career ==
Krezyman started her career at UKS SMS Łódź, before joining French side Dijon. On 29 June 2026, she signed with Women's Super League side Brighton & Hove Albion on a free transfer, with the move set to take effect on 1 July.

== Career statistics ==
=== Club ===
As of match played 22 November 2026

Appearances and goals by club, season and competition
Club	Season	League			National cup (Note: Includes Polish Cup, Coupe de France)		League cup (Note: Includes WSL Players Cup)		Europe		Other		Total	
Club	Season	Division	Apps	Goals	Apps	Goals	Apps	Goals	Apps	Goals	Apps	Goals	Apps	Goals
UKS SMS Łódź III	2019–20	II liga, group I	2	5	1	0	—		—		—		3	5
UKS SMS Łódź III	2020–21	II liga West	2	2	0	0	—		—		—		2	2
UKS SMS Łódź III	2021–22	II liga West	1	2	0	0	—		—		—		1	2
UKS SMS Łódź III	Total		5	9	1	0	—		—		—		6	9
UKS SMS Łódź II	2019–20	I liga	0	0	2	0	—		—		—		2	0
UKS SMS Łódź	2020–21	Ekstraliga	16	3	4	1	—		—		—		20	4
UKS SMS Łódź	2021–22	Ekstraliga	20	4	3	1	—		—		—		23	5
UKS SMS Łódź	2022–23	Ekstraliga	10	2	1	0	—		2 (Note: Appearances in UEFA Champions League)	0	—		13	2
UKS SMS Łódź	2023–24	Ekstraliga	21	6	4	0	—		—		—		25	6
UKS SMS Łódź	Total		67	15	12	2	—		2	0	—		81	17
Dijon	2024–25	Première Ligue	16	3	2	0	—		—		—		18	3
Dijon	2025–26	Première Ligue	21	5	1	0	—		—		2 (Note: Appearances in Coupe LFFP)	0	24	5
Dijon	Total		37	8	3	0	—		—		2	0	42	8
Brighton & Hove Albion	2026–27	WSL	3	0	0	0	1	0	—		—		4	0
Career total			112	32	18	2	1	0	2	0	2	0	135	34

=== International ===
As of match played 9 June 2026

Appearances and goals by national team and year
National team	Year	Apps	Goals
Poland	2023	1	0
Poland	2024	6	1
Poland	2025	9	2
Poland	2026	4	0
Total		20	3

Scores and results list Poland's goal tally first, score column indicates score after each Krezyman goal.

List of international goals scored by Nadia Krezyman
No.	Date	Venue	Opponent	Score	Result	Competition
1	29 October 2024	Gdańsk Stadium, Gdańsk, Poland	Romania	4–0	4–1	UEFA Euro 2025 qualifying play-offs
2	28 October 2025	Rodney Parade, Newport, Wales	Wales	1–1	5–2	Friendly
3	28 October 2025	Rodney Parade, Newport, Wales	Wales	3–1	5–2	Friendly

== Honours ==
UKS SMS Łódź

- Ekstraliga: 2021–22
- Polish Cup: 2022–23
