= Emilie Joramo =

Norwegian footballer (born 2002)

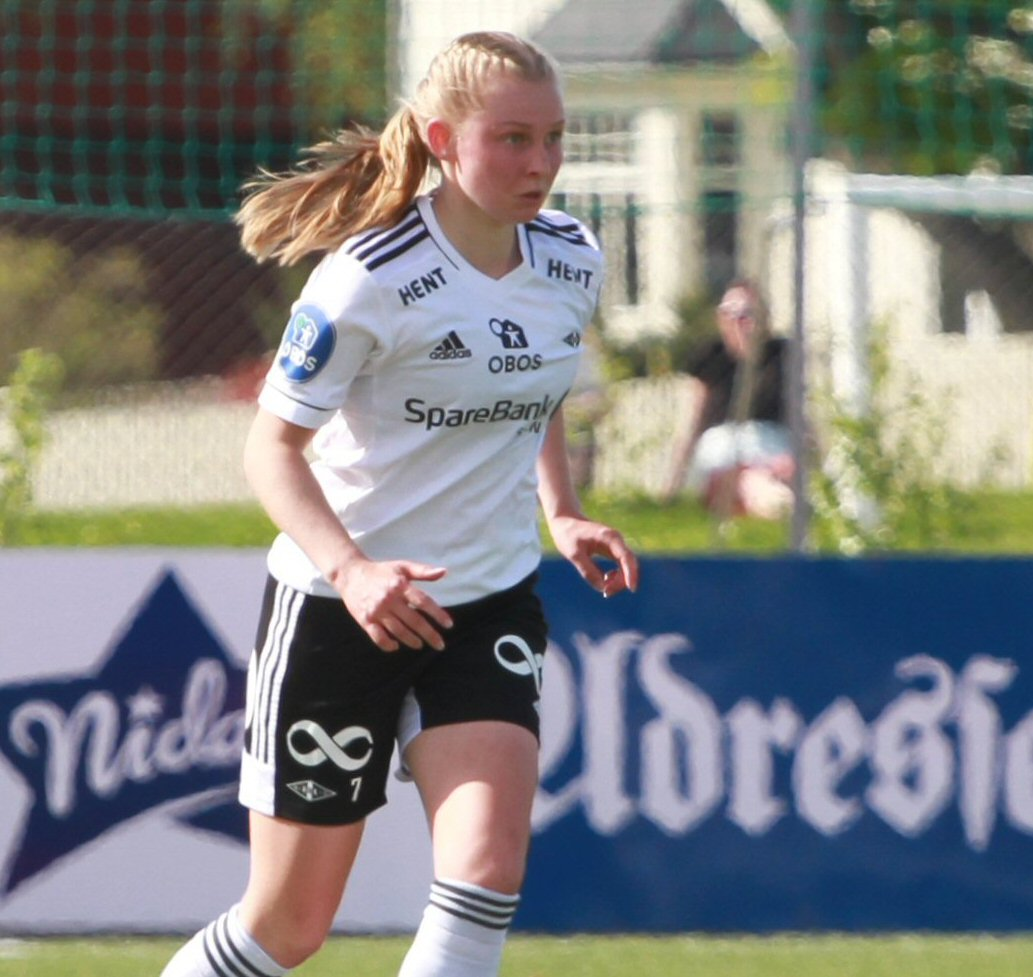
- Joramo playing for Rosenborg in 2021.

Personal information
- Full name: Emilie Marie Joramo
- Date of birth: 13 January 2002 (age 24)
- Position: Midfielder

Team information
- Current team: Brighton & Hove Albion
- Number: 15

Youth career
- 2014–2016: Rennebu
- 2017: Tiller

Senior career*
Years	Team	Apps	(Gls)
2018–2023	Rosenborg	106	(10)
2023–2026	Hammarby	62	(8)
2026–	Brighton & Hove Albion	9	(0)

International career
2018	Norway U16	15	(2)
2019	Norway U17	7	(1)
2019–2020	Norway U19	9	(1)
2021–	Norway U23	7	(0)
2022–	Norway	3	(0)
- * Club domestic league appearances and goals as of 22 November 2026

Emilie Marie Joramo (born 13 January 2002) is a Norwegian football player who plays for Women's Super League club Brighton & Hove Albion and the Norway national team.

In 2021, when Joramo was 19, the local newspaper Nidaros updated their list of the 1000 all time best athletes from Trøndelag, and Joramo was ranked as 459.

== Club career ==
In 2017, Joramo won the Norwegian Under-16 Championship with Tiller IL.

Joramo debuted in Toppserien for Trondheims-Ørn (now Rosenborg) in September 2019. In 2020, after her second season in Toppserien, Norske fotballkvinner named har young player of the season. Two years later, in 2022, she was named player of the season.

In December 2023, Joramo transferred to Hammarby for an undisclosed fee. On 16 June 2026, after two years at the club, Hammarby announced her departure, with sporting director Arnór Smárason stating that "she has expressed a desire to try something new now that her contract is coming to an end."

On 26 June 2026, Joramo signed with Women's Super League side Brighton & Hove Albion on a free transfer, with the move set to take effect on 1 July.

== International career ==
Joramo has played matches for the Norway youth national teams U15, U16, U17, U18, U19, and U23.

In August 2022, she was called up for the first time for the Norway national team, which also was the first call up done by Hege Riise, the head coach. She debuted in the World Cup qualification match against Belgium on 2 September 2022.

== Career statistics ==
=== Club ===
As of match played 22 November 2026.

Appearances and goals by club, season and competition
Club	Season	League			National cup		League cup		Continental		Total	
Club	Season	Division	Apps	Goals	Apps	Goals	Apps	Goals	Apps	Goals	Apps	Goals
Rosenborg	2018	Toppserien	2	0	0	0	—		—		2	0
Rosenborg	2019	Toppserien	21	1	0	0	—		—		21	1
Rosenborg	2020	Toppserien	18	0	0	0	—		—		18	0
Rosenborg	2021	Toppserien	16	1	1 (Note: Appearances in Norwegian Women's Cup)	0	—		—		17	1
Rosenborg	2022	Toppserien	24	2	2	0	—		2 (Note: Appearances in UEFA Women's Champions League)	0	28	2
Rosenborg	2023	Toppserien	25	6	3	0	—		4	0	32	6
Rosenborg	Total		106	10	6	0	—		6	0	118	10
Hammarby	2024	Damallsvenskan	26	3	4 (Note: Appearances in Svenska Cupen)	0	—		0	0	30	3
Hammarby	2025	Damallsvenskan	25	3	4	0	—		8	0	37	3
Hammarby	2026	Damallsvenskan	11	2	5	1	—		12 (Note: Appearances in UEFA Women's Champions League and UEFA Women's Europa Cup)	1	28	4
Hammarby	Total		62	8	13	1	—		20	1	95	10
Brighton & Hove Albion	2026–27	WSL	9	0	0	0	5 (Note: Appearances in FA Women's League Cup)	1	—		14	1
Career total			177	18	19	1	5	1	26	1	227	21
