= Women's Super League Player of the Season =

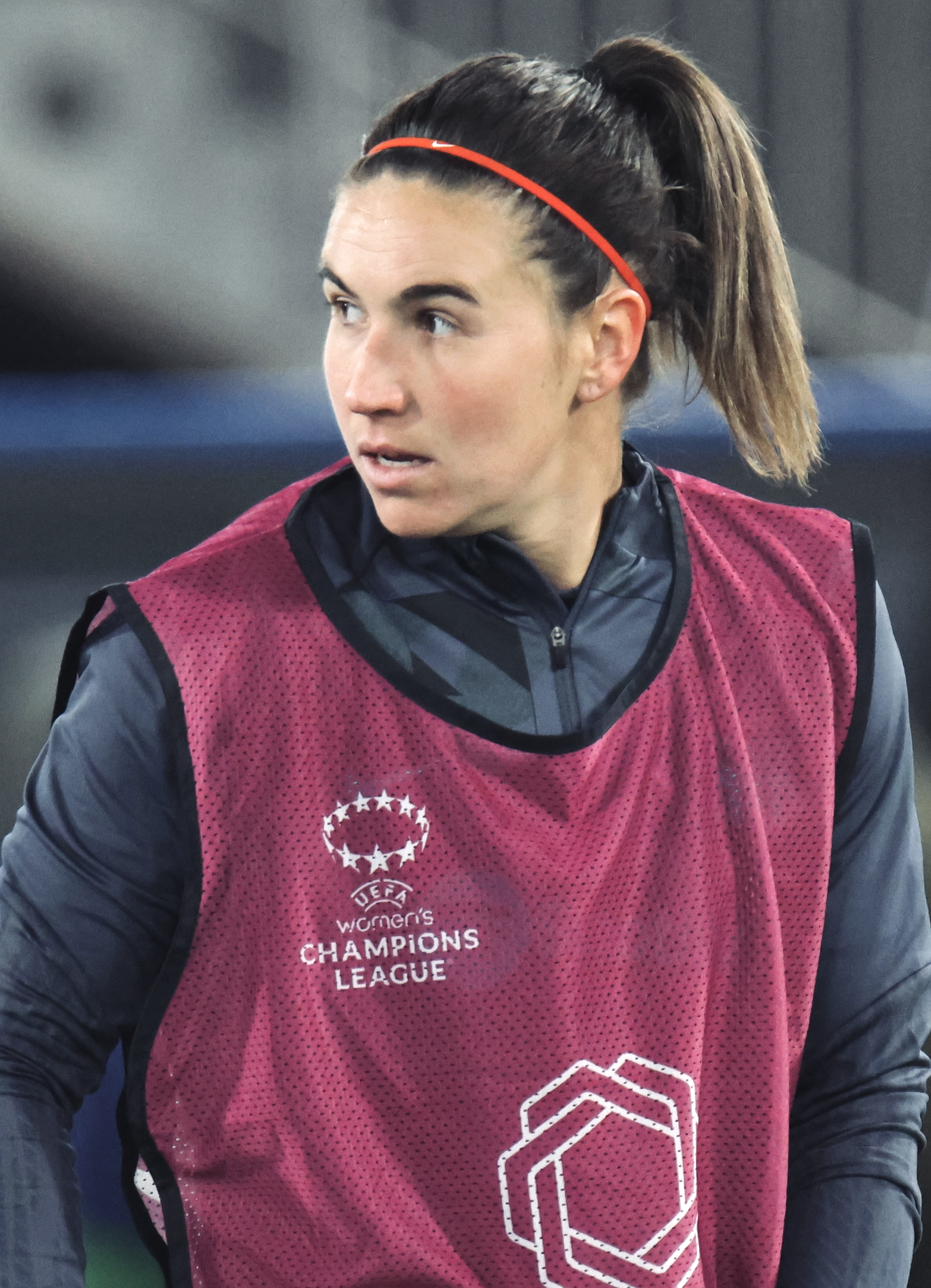
- Khadija Shaw is the current holder of the award.
- Awarded for: The most outstanding player in each given Premier League season
- Sponsored by: Barclays
- Country: England
- Presented by: Women's Super League

Highlights
- Most awards: Khadija Shaw (2), Bethany England, Fran Kirby, Sam Kerr, Rachel Daly and Mariona Caldentey (1)
- Most team wins: Chelsea (3)

The Women's Super League Player of the Season is an annual association football award presented to players in England, which recognises the most outstanding player in the Women's Super League each season.

For sponsorship purposes it has been called the Barclays WSL's Player of the Season since its inception in 2020.

== Winners ==
Key
Player (X)	Name of the player and number of times they had won the award at that point (if more than one)
†	Indicates multiple award winners in the same season
‡	Denotes the club were Women's Super League champions in the same season

Women's Super League Player of the Season winners
Season	Player	Nationality	Club	Ref(s)
2019–20	Bethany England	England	Chelsea^{‡}	
2020–21	Fran Kirby	England	Chelsea^{‡}	
2021–22	Sam Kerr	Australia	Chelsea^{‡}	
2022–23	Rachel Daly	England	Aston Villa	
2023–24	Khadija Shaw	Jamaica	Manchester City	
2024–25	Mariona Caldentey	Spain	Arsenal	

== Awards won by nationality ==
Country	Players	Total
England	3	3
Australia	1	1
Jamaica	1	2
Spain	1	1

== Awards won by club ==
Club	Players	Total
Chelsea	3	3
Arsenal	1	1
Aston Villa	1	1
Manchester City	1	2

== See also ==
- Women's Super League Save of the Month
- Women's Super League Golden Glove
- Women's Super League Golden Boot
