= 2026–27 Brighton & Hove Albion W.F.C. season =

Brighton & Hove Albion
2026–27 season
- Chairman: Tony Bloom
- Manager: Arturo Ruiz
- Stadium: Broadfield Stadium, Crawley
- Women's Super League: 7th
- FA Cup: Fourth round
- WSL Players Cup: League Phase, 2nd
- Top goalscorer: League: Kiko Seike (4 Goals); All: Caitlin Hayes; Emily Murphy; Kiko Seike (4 Goals each)
- Highest home attendance: 4,104 (vs Arsenal, 6 September 2026) at Broadfield Stadium; 4,502 (vs Liverpool, 14 November 2026) at Falmer Stadium
- Lowest home attendance: 505 (vs Charlton Athletic, 23 September 2026) at Broadfield Stadium
- Average home league attendance: 3,379
- Biggest win: 6–0 vs Wolverhampton Wanderers (A) (WSL Players Cup – 28 October 2026)
- Biggest defeat: 0–3 vs Liverpool (H) (WSL – 14 November 2026)
Home colours	Away colours	Third colours
- All statistics correct as of 22 November 2026.

The 2026–27 Brighton & Hove Albion W.F.C. season is the club's 36th season in existence and their ninth in the Women's Super League, the highest level of the football pyramid. Along with competing in the WSL, the club compete in two domestic cup competitions: the FA Cup and the WSL Players Cup.

== Squad ==
As of 29 August 2026

Note: Flags indicate national team as defined under FIFA eligibility rules; some limited exceptions apply. Players may hold more than one non-FIFA nationality.

No.	Pos.	Nation	Player
2	DF	COL	Manuela Vanegas
3	DF	JPN	Moeka Minami
5	DF	FRA	Maelys Mpomé
6	DF	ENG	Gabby George
7	FW	TAN	Aisha Masaka
8	MF	ENG	Maisie Symonds (captain)
9	FW	USA	Madison Haley
10	MF	SRB	Jelena Čanković
11	FW	JPN	Kiko Seike
13	MF	SUI	Lia Wälti
14	MF	ENG	Fran Kirby
15	MF	NOR	Emilie Joramo
16	GK	NGR	Chiamaka Nnadozie
17	MF	ENG	Bex Rayner

No.	Pos.	Nation	Player
18	DF	IRL	Caitlin Hayes
19	DF	NED	Marisa Olislagers
20	MF	NOR	Olaug Tvedten
21	FW	USA	Olivia García
23	DF	NED	Marit Auée
25	GK	ENG	Hannah Poulter
27	MF	ENG	Sophie Peskett
28	GK	GER	Melina Loeck
30	GK	ENG	Eleanor Heeps
33	DF	AUS	Charlie Rule
35	FW	IRL	Emily Murphy
41	MF	ENG	Taylor Warren
44	FW	POL	Nadia Krezyman
64	MF	ENG	Emilie Gay

== Pre-season and friendlies ==
30 July 2026 Friendly	Brighton & Hove Albion	3–1	(Norway) Brann	Lancing
	Kirby; Murphy; Krezyman	Report	Aahjem	Stadium: American Express Elite Football Performance Centre; Attendance: 0 (Behind closed doors)

6 August 2026 Friendly	Brighton & Hove Albion	3–0	Watford	Lancing
	Rule; Murphy; Rayner			Stadium: American Express Elite Football Performance Centre; Attendance: 0 (Behind closed doors)

9 August 2026 Friendly	Brighton & Hove Albion	1–1	(France) Paris Saint-Germain	Falmer
12:00 BST	Symonds 85'	Report	Charlier 37'	Stadium: Falmer Stadium; Attendance: 1,642

15 August 2026 Friendly	Brighton & Hove Albion	4–0	Crystal Palace	Lancing
				Stadium: American Express Elite Football Performance Centre; Attendance: 0 (Behind closed doors)

18 August 2026 Friendly	Genk (Netherlands)	0–3	Brighton & Hove Albion	Netherlands
		Report	Tvedten, Warren

21 August 2026 Women's Joan Gamper Trophy	Barcelona (Spain)	3–1	Brighton & Hove Albion	Sant Joan Despí, Spain
19:00 BST	Brugts 7'; Pina 22'; Graham 32'	Report	Seike 12'	Stadium: Johan Cruyff Stadium; Attendance: 3,904; Referee: Tetyana Fernández Vila

=== Pre-season and friendly goalscorers ===
As of 21 August 2026

Rnk	No	Pos	Nat	Name	Goals
1	20	MF	(Norway)	Olaug Tvedten	2
1	35	FW	(Republic of Ireland)	Emily Murphy	2
2	8	MF	(England)	Maisie Symonds	1
2	11	FW	(Japan)	Kiko Seike	1
2	14	MF	(England)	Fran Kirby	1
2	17	MF	(England)	Bex Rayner	1
2	33	DF	(Australia)	Charlie Rule	1
2	41	MF	(England)	Taylor Warren	1
2	44	FW	(Poland)	Nadia Krezyman	1
Total					11

== Competitions ==
=== Overall record ===
Competition	First match	Last match	Starting round	Record							
Competition	First match	Last match	Starting round	Pld	W	D	L	GF	GA	GD	Win %
Women's Super League	6 September 2026	22 May 2027	Matchday 1	11	4	2	5	17	16	+1	36.36
Women's FA Cup	17 January 2027		Fourth Round	0	0	0	0	0	0	+0	—
WSL Players Cup	23 September 2026		League Phase	5	4	0	1	14	2	+12	80.00
Total				16	8	2	6	31	18	+13	50.00

Last updated: 22 November 2026
Source: Soccerway

=== Women's Super League ===
==== Results summary ====
Overall								Home						Away					
Pld	W	D	L	GF	GA	GD	Pts	W	D	L	GF	GA	GD	W	D	L	GF	GA	GD
11	4	2	5	17	16	+1	14	3	1	2	11	7	+4	1	1	3	6	9	−3

Last updated: 22 November 2026.
Source: Women's Super League

==== Results by matchday ====
Round	1	2	3	4	5	6	7	8	9	10	11	12	13	14	15	16	17	18	19	20	21	22	23	24	25	26
Ground	H	A	H	A	H	A	H	H	A	H	A	A	H	A	H	H	A	H	A	A	H	A	H	A	A	H
Result	L	D	D	L	W	L	W	W	L	L	W															
Position	10	10	10	11	9	12	9	6	7	11	7															
Points	0	1	2	2	5	5	8	11	11	11	14															

Updated to match(es) played on 22 November 2026. Source: Women's Super League
A = Away; H = Home; W = Win; D = Draw; L = Loss

==== Matches ====
Brighton & Hove Albion WSL fixtures

Win Draw Loss Fixtures

6 September 2026 1	Brighton & Hove Albion	0–1	Arsenal	Crawley
12:00 BST	Rule (yellow card) 85'; Murphy (yellow card) 87'	Report	Baum 10'; Williamson (yellow card) 49'; Little (yellow card) 83'	Stadium: Broadfield Stadium; Attendance: 4,104; Referee: Kirsty Dowle

13 September 2026 2	Birmingham City	2–2	Brighton & Hove Albion	Birmingham (Bordesley)
14:00 BST	Hurtré 8'; Crosthwaite 51'; Leidhammar (yellow card) 68'	Report	Seike (yellow card) 74', (goal) 90+5'; García 77'; Haley (yellow card) 90+3'	Stadium: St Andrew's; Attendance: 1,405; Referee: Sophie Dennington

20 September 2026 3	Brighton & Hove Albion	1–1	Aston Villa	Falmer
14:00 BST	Haley (yellow card) 20'; George 31'	Report	Maritz (yellow card) 86'; Wilms 89'	Stadium: Falmer Stadium; Attendance: 3,137; Referee: Adewunmi Soneye

26 September 2026 4	London City Lionesses	2–0	Brighton & Hove Albion	Bromley
17:00 BST	Putellas 29'; León (yellow card) 75'; Geyoro (yellow card) 88'; Corrales 90+2'	Report	Hayes (yellow card) 18'; Vanegas (yellow card) 53'; George (yellow card) 65'	Stadium: Hayes Lane; Attendance: 4,177; Referee: Phoebe Cross

4 October 2026 5	Brighton & Hove Albion	5–1	Charlton Athletic	Falmer
14:00 BST	Seike 25', 54'; Kirby 45+2'; Tvedten (yellow card) 73'; Symonds 90+3'; George 90+9'	Report	Korhonen 3'; Neville (yellow card) 46'; Siber (yellow card) 62'; N'Dow (yellow card) 80'	Stadium: Falmer Stadium; Attendance: 2,465; Referee: Adewunmi Soneye

18 October 2026 6	Manchester City	3–2	Brighton & Hove Albion	Manchester
14:30 BST	Shaw 5', 16'; Charles 17'	Report	García 31'; Hayes 37'; Vanegas (yellow card) 90+4'	Stadium: Academy Stadium; Attendance: 3,141; Referee: Leigh Doughty
Note: Fixture was initially scheduled for 14:00, but was rescheduled for live BBC Two broadcasting.

24 October 2026 7	Brighton & Hove Albion	3–0	West Ham United	Falmer
17:15 BST	Symonds 29'; García (yellow card) 56'; Kirby 63'; Seike 66'	Report		Stadium: Falmer Stadium; Attendance: 4,373; Referee: Grace Lowe
Note: Fixture was initially scheduled for 25 October 2026 at 14:00, but was rescheduled for live Sky Sports broadcasting.

1 November 2026 8	Brighton & Hove Albion	2–1	Crystal Palace	Crawley
14:00 GMT	Mpomé (yellow card) 36'; Hayes 59'; Peskett 64'	Report	Blanchard 34'; Enge (yellow card) 90'	Stadium: Broadfield Stadium; Attendance: 1,690; Referee: Phoebe Cross

8 November 2026 9	Tottenham Hotspur	2–1	Brighton & Hove Albion	Leyton
14:00 GMT	Gaupset 52'; Holdt 53'	Report	Kirby 2'	Stadium: Brisbane Road; Attendance: 1,170; Referee: Melissa Burgin

14 November 2026 10	Brighton & Hove Albion	0–3	Liverpool	Falmer
17:15 GMT	Tvedten (yellow card) 35'	Report	Olsson 4', 78'; Kapocs 48'	Stadium: Falmer Stadium; Attendance: 4,502; Referee: Kirsty Dowle

22 November 2026 11	Everton	0–1	Brighton & Hove Albion	Liverpool
14:00 GMT	Galli (yellow card) 84'	Report	Pacheco 6' (o.g.); García (yellow card) 58'	Stadium: Goodison Park; Referee: William Davis

13 December 2026 12	Manchester United	v	Brighton & Hove Albion	Leigh
13:00 GMT				Stadium: Leigh Sports Village

19 December 2026 13	Brighton & Hove Albion	v	Chelsea	Crawley
12:30 GMT				Stadium: Broadfield Stadium

10 January 2027 14	Arsenal	v	Brighton & Hove Albion	Holloway
12:30 GMT				Stadium: Emirates Stadium

20 January 2027 15	Brighton & Hove Albion	v	Tottenham Hotspur	Crawley
19:45 GMT				Stadium: Broadfield Stadium

24 January 2027 16	Brighton & Hove Albion	v	Birmingham City	Crawley
14:00 GMT				Stadium: Broadfield Stadium

31 January 2027 17	Liverpool	v	Brighton & Hove Albion	St Helens
14:00 GMT				Stadium: St Helens Stadium

7 February 2027 18	Brighton & Hove Albion	v	Everton	Crawley
14:00 GMT				Stadium: Broadfield Stadium

14 February 2027 19	Aston Villa	v	Brighton & Hove Albion	Aston
14:00 GMT				Stadium: Villa Park

14 March 2027 20	West Ham United	v	Brighton & Hove Albion	Dagenham
14:00 GMT				Stadium: Victoria Road

17 March 2027 21	Brighton & Hove Albion	v	London City Lionesses	Crawley
19:45 GMT				Stadium: Broadfield Stadium

28 March 2027 22	Charlton Athletic	v	Brighton & Hove Albion	Charlton
14:00 BST				Stadium: The Valley

4 April 2027 23	Brighton & Hove Albion	v	Manchester City	Crawley
14:00 BST				Stadium: Broadfield Stadium

2 May 2027 24	Crystal Palace	v	Brighton & Hove Albion	Sutton
14:00 BST				Stadium: Gander Green Lane

9 May 2027 25	Chelsea	v	Brighton & Hove Albion	Fulham
14:00 BST				Stadium: Stamford Bridge

22 May 2027 26	Brighton & Hove Albion	v	Manchester United	Crawley
12:00 BST				Stadium: Broadfield Stadium

(Clocks move to GMT on the last Sunday of October. For 2026, this is on Sunday, 25 October 2026 at 2:00 AM. They will move forward one hour in 2027 on Sunday, 28 March at 1:00 am, moving to BST.)

==== League table ====
Pos	Team	Pld	W	D	L	GF	GA	GD	Pts
5	Tottenham Hotspur	11	6	2	3	28	19	+9	20
6	Arsenal	11	3	6	2	11	11	0	15
7	Brighton & Hove Albion	11	4	2	5	17	16	+1	14
8	Aston Villa	11	3	5	3	12	17	−5	14
9	West Ham United	11	4	1	6	11	19	−8	13

Updated to match(es) played on 22 November 2026. Source: Women's Super League Table
Rules for classification: 1) Points; 2) Goal difference; 3) Number of goals scored.

=== FA Cup ===
As a member of the Women's Super League Brighton & Hove Albion will enter the FA Cup in the fourth round.

=== WSL Players Cup ===
==== League Phase ====
23 September 2026 League Phase	Brighton & Hove Albion	4–0	Charlton Athletic	Crawley
19:45 BST	Tvedten 14', 55'; Hayes 65'; Peskett 82'	Report		Stadium: Broadfield Stadium; Attendance: 505; Referee: Oliver Mackey

30 September 2026 League Phase	Brighton & Hove Albion	0–1	Tottenham Hotspur	Crawley
19:45 BST	Auée (yellow card) 20'	Report	Holdt 36'	Stadium: Broadfield Stadium; Attendance: 620; Referee: Stacey Pearson

28 October 2026 League Phase	Wolverhampton Wanderers	0–6	Brighton & Hove Albion	Telford (Wellington)
19:30 GMT	George (yellow card) 33'	Report	Hayes 4'; Tvedten 45+1'; Joramo 47'; Warren 49'; Murphy 65' (pen.); Mpomé 88', (yellow card) 90+3'	Stadium: New Bucks Head; Attendance: 695; Referee: Lisa Benn

11 November 2026 League Phase	Brighton & Hove Albion	3–1	Watford	Crawley
19:45 GMT	Murphy 58', 84'; García 69'	Report	Teisar 27'; Filbey (yellow card) 71'; Haines (yellow card) 82'	Stadium: Broadfield Stadium; Attendance: 539; Referee: Ryan Atkin

18 November 2026 League Phase	London City Lionesses	0–1	Brighton & Hove Albion	London (Bromley)
19:00 GMT	Kafaji (yellow card) 10' (yellow-red card) 17'; Linari (yellow card) 45'	Report	George (yellow card) 58'; Murphy 67', (yellow card) 90+1'; Joramo (yellow card) 85'	Stadium: Hayes Lane; Attendance: 1,048; Referee: Sophie Dennington

16 December 2026 League Phase	Southampton	v	Brighton & Hove Albion	Eastleigh
19:00 GMT				Stadium: Ten Acres

Pos	Grp	Team	Pld	W	PW	PL	L	GF	GA	GD	Pts	Qualification
1	NR	Manchester United	5	5	0	0	0	25	6	+19	15	Advance to Knockout Phase
2	SR	Brighton & Hove Albion	5	4	0	0	1	14	2	+12	12	Advance to Knockout Phase
3	NR	Everton	5	4	0	0	1	13	3	+10	12	Advance to Knockout Phase
4	NR	Liverpool	5	4	0	0	1	19	12	+7	12	Advance to Knockout Phase
5	SR	London City Lionesses	5	4	0	0	1	9	4	+5	12	Advance to Knockout Phase

Updated to match(es) played on 18 November 2026. Source: WSL Football
Rules for classification: 1) Points; 2) Goal difference; 3) Number of goals scored; 4) Number of wins; 5) Head-to-head record

== Squad statistics ==
Italics indicate a loaned in player.

=== Appearances ===
As of match played on 22 November 2026

Starting appearances are listed first, followed by substitute appearances after the + symbol where applicable.

No.	Pos	Nat	Player	Total		WSL		FA Cup		WSL Players Cup	
No.	Pos	Nat	Player	Apps	Goals	Apps	Goals	Apps	Goals	Apps	Goals
2	DF	(Colombia) COL	Manuela Vanegas	15	0	11	0	0	0	3+1	0
3	DF	(Japan) JPN	Moeka Minami	2	0	2	0	0	0	0	0
5	DF	(France) FRA	Maelys Mpomé	11	1	5+2	0	0	0	0+4	1
6	DF	(England) ENG	Gabby George	10	2	5+1	2	0	0	3+1	0
8	MF	(England) ENG	Maisie Symonds	16	2	11	2	0	0	2+3	0
9	MF	(United States) USA	Madison Haley	3	0	3	0	0	0	0	0
10	MF	(Serbia) SRB	Jelena Čanković	7	0	4+1	0	0	0	0+2	0
11	FW	(Japan) JPN	Kiko Seike	12	4	8+1	4	0	0	1+2	0
13	MF	(Switzerland) SUI	Lia Wälti	11	0	6+1	0	0	0	2+2	0
14	MF	(England) ENG	Fran Kirby	13	3	11	3	0	0	0+2	0
15	MF	(Norway) NOR	Emilie Joramo	14	1	5+4	0	0	0	5	1
16	GK	(Nigeria) NGR	Chiamaka Nnadozie	12	0	11	0	0	0	1	0
17	MF	(England) ENG	Bex Rayner	10	0	0+5	0	0	0	5	0
18	DF	(Republic of Ireland) IRL	Caitlin Hayes	16	4	11	2	0	0	4+1	2
19	DF	(Netherlands) NED	Marisa Olislagers	15	0	9+2	0	0	0	2+2	0
20	MF	(Norway) NOR	Olaug Tvedten	15	3	5+6	0	0	0	3+1	3
21	FW	(United States) USA	Olivia García	16	3	7+4	2	0	0	3+2	1
23	DF	(Netherlands) NED	Marit Auée	10	0	1+4	0	0	0	5	0
27	MF	(England) ENG	Sophie Peskett	11	2	2+5	1	0	0	4	1
28	GK	(Germany) GER	Melina Loeck	4	0	0	0	0	0	4	0
33	MF	(Australia) AUS	Charlie Rule	1	0	1	0	0	0	0	0
35	FW	(Republic of Ireland) IRL	Emily Murphy	16	4	3+8	0	0	0	5	4
41	MF	(England) ENG	Taylor Warren	4	1	0+1	0	0	0	2+1	1
44	FW	(Poland) POL	Nadia Krezyman	4	0	0+3	0	0	0	0+1	0
64	MF	(England) ENG	Emilie Gay	1	0	0	0	0	0	1	0

=== Goalscorers ===
As of match played on 22 November 2026

Rnk	No	Pos	Nat	Name	WSL	FA Cup	WSL Players Cup	Total
1	11	FW	(Japan)	Kiko Seike	4	0	0	4
1	18	DF	(Republic of Ireland)	Caitlin Hayes	2	0	2	4
1	35	FW	(Republic of Ireland)	Emily Murphy	0	0	4	4
4	14	MF	(England)	Fran Kirby	3	0	0	3
4	20	MF	(Norway)	Olaug Tvedten	0	0	3	3
4	21	FW	(United States)	Olivia García	2	0	1	3
7	6	DF	(England)	Gabby George	2	0	0	2
7	8	MF	(England)	Maisie Symonds	2	0	0	2
7	27	MF	(England)	Sophie Peskett	1	0	1	2
10	5	DF	(France)	Maelys Mpomé	0	0	1	1
10	15	MF	(Norway)	Emilie Joramo	0	0	1	1
10	41	MF	(England)	Taylor Warren	0	0	1	1
Own goals					1	0	0	1
Total					17	0	14	31

=== Assists ===
As of match played on 22 November 2026

Rank	No.	Pos.	Nat.	Player	WSL	FA Cup	WSL Players Cup	Total
1	15	MF	(Norway)	Emilie Joramo	2	0	2	4
2	20	MF	(Norway)	Olaug Tvedten	1	0	2	3
3	2	DF	(Colombia)	Manuela Vanegas	1	0	1	2
3	14	MF	(England)	Fran Kirby	2	0	0	2
3	19	DF	(Netherlands)	Marisa Olislagers	1	0	1	2
6	8	MF	(England)	Maisie Symonds	1	0	0	1
6	11	FW	(Japan)	Kiko Seike	0	0	1	1
6	18	DF	(Republic of Ireland)	Caitlin Hayes	1	0	0	1
6	21	FW	(United States)	Olivia García	0	0	1	1
6	27	MF	(England)	Sophie Peskett	0	0	1	1
Total					9	0	9	18

=== Clean sheets ===
As of match played on 22 November 2026

Rank	No.	Pos.	Nat.	Player	Matches played	Clean sheet %	WSL	FA Cup	WSL Players Cup	Total
1	28	GK	(Germany)	Melina Loeck	4	75.00%	0	0	3	3
2	16	GK	(Nigeria)	Chiamaka Nnadozie	12	16.67%	2	0	0	2
Totals					16	31.25%	2	0	3	5

=== Disciplinary record ===
As of match played on 22 November 2026

No.	Pos.	Nat.	Player	WSL			FA Cup			WSL Players Cup			Total		
No.	Pos.	Nat.	Player	Yellow card	(yellow card) (yellow-red card)	Red card	Yellow card	(yellow card) (yellow-red card)	Red card	Yellow card	(yellow card) (yellow-red card)	Red card	Yellow card	(yellow card) (yellow-red card)	Red card
2	DF	(Colombia)	Manuela Vanegas	2	0	0	0	0	0	0	0	0	2	0	0
5	DF	(France)	Maelys Mpomé	1	0	0	0	0	0	1	0	0	2	0	0
6	DF	(England)	Gabby George	1	0	0	0	0	0	1	0	0	2	0	0
9	MF	(United States)	Madison Haley	2	0	0	0	0	0	0	0	0	2	0	0
11	FW	(Japan)	Kiko Seike	1	0	0	0	0	0	0	0	0	1	0	0
15	MF	(Norway)	Emilie Joramo	0	0	0	0	0	0	1	0	0	1	0	0
18	DF	(Republic of Ireland)	Caitlin Hayes	1	0	0	0	0	0	0	0	0	1	0	0
20	MF	(Norway)	Olaug Tvedten	2	0	0	0	0	0	0	0	0	2	0	0
21	FW	(United States)	Olivia García	2	0	0	0	0	0	0	0	0	2	0	0
23	DF	(Netherlands)	Marit Auée	0	0	0	0	0	0	1	0	0	1	0	0
33	MF	(Australia)	Charlie Rule	1	0	0	0	0	0	0	0	0	1	0	0
35	FW	(Republic of Ireland)	Emily Murphy	1	0	0	0	0	0	1	0	0	2	0	0
Total				14	0	0	0	0	0	5	0	0	19	0	0

== Awards ==
=== Player Awards ===
==== Barclays WSL Player of the Month ====
Month	Pos.	Player	G	A	CS	Result	Ref.
October	DF	(Republic of Ireland) Caitlin Hayes	2	1	–	Nominated	

==== Barclays WSL Goal of the Month ====
Month	Pos.	Player	Opposition	Result	Ref.
October	MF	(England) Maisie Symonds	West Ham United	Won	

== Transfers ==
=== In ===
Date	Pos.	Name	From	Ref.
30 June 2026	GK	(England) Eleanor Heeps	(England) Tottenham Hotspur	
1 July 2026	MF	(Norway) Emilie Joramo	(Sweden) Hammarby	
1 July 2026	FW	(Poland) Nadia Krezyman	(France) Dijon	
4 July 2026	MF	(Switzerland) Lia Wälti	(Italy) Juventus	
7 July 2026	MF	(England) Sophie Peskett	(England) Ipswich Town	
24 July 2026	FW	(Republic of Ireland) Emily Murphy	(England) Newcastle United	
6 August 2026	DF	(England) Gabby George	(England) Manchester United	

=== Out ===
Date	Pos.	Name	To	Ref.
30 June 2026	GK	(England) Sophie Baggaley	(England) Birmingham City	
30 June 2026	MF	(England) Libby Bance	(England) Leicester City	
1 July 2026	MF	(Netherlands) Nadine Noordam	(Netherlands) Ajax	
16 July 2026	DF	(Scotland) Rachel McLauchlan	(England) Newcastle United	

=== Loans out ===
Date	Pos.	Name	To	Until	Ref.
1 August 2026	FW	(England) Lily Dent	(England) Sunderland	End of Season	
11 August 2026	FW	(Spain) Carla Camacho	(Italy) Lazio	End of Season	
15 August 2026	FW	(England) Olivia Johnson	(England) Lewes	End of Season	
19 August 2026	DF	(England) Grace McEwan	(England) Nottingham Forest	End of Season	
24 August 2026	MF	(Japan) Fuka Tsunoda	(England) Crystal Palace	End of Season	
31 August 2026	DF	(England) Jess Pegram	(Sweden) Hammarby	End of Season	
28 October 2026	GK	(England) Hannah Poulter	(England) Lewes	Short Term	

=== New contracts ===
Date	Pos.	Player	Contract expiry	Ref.
First team
27 July 2026	MF	(England) Maisie Symonds	Undisclosed	
29 July 2026	DF	(Netherlands) Marisa Olislagers	Undisclosed	
5 October 2026	DF	(Colombia) Manuela Vanegas	Undisclosed	
Academy
20 July 2026	GK	(England) Silvana Marshall Miranda	Undisclosed (Note: First professional contract)	
