= Sussex Martlet League =

- Founded: 1967
- Folded: 1990 (rebranded to South East Counties Women's Football League)
- Location: England
- Founder: Norma Witherden

The Sussex Martlet League was a women's football association tournament founded in 1969 by local organiser Norma Witherden, originally with just six Sussex teams. The idea was to build on the success of England's 1966 World Cup victory. Female telephonists at the General Post Office challenged postmen, leading directly to the creation of the Sussex Martlet League.

== The FA ban ==
In 1966, female footballers were banned from using Football Association approved pitches or official referees so the Women's Football Association was established in 1969, showing that the Sussex Martlet League was created in lockstep with a national movement for women playing football. June Jaycocks, from Brighton who went on to become International Officer for the Women's Football Association helped establish Brighton GPO, one of the original six teams to found the Martlet League.

== Merger with SECWFL ==
In 1990, due to a footballing restructure by the Women's Football Association, and an influx in clubs from neighbouring areas, the Sussex Martlet League merged with other clubs to become the South East Counties Women's Football League (SECWFL).
