= Sophie Peskett =

English footballer (born 2002)

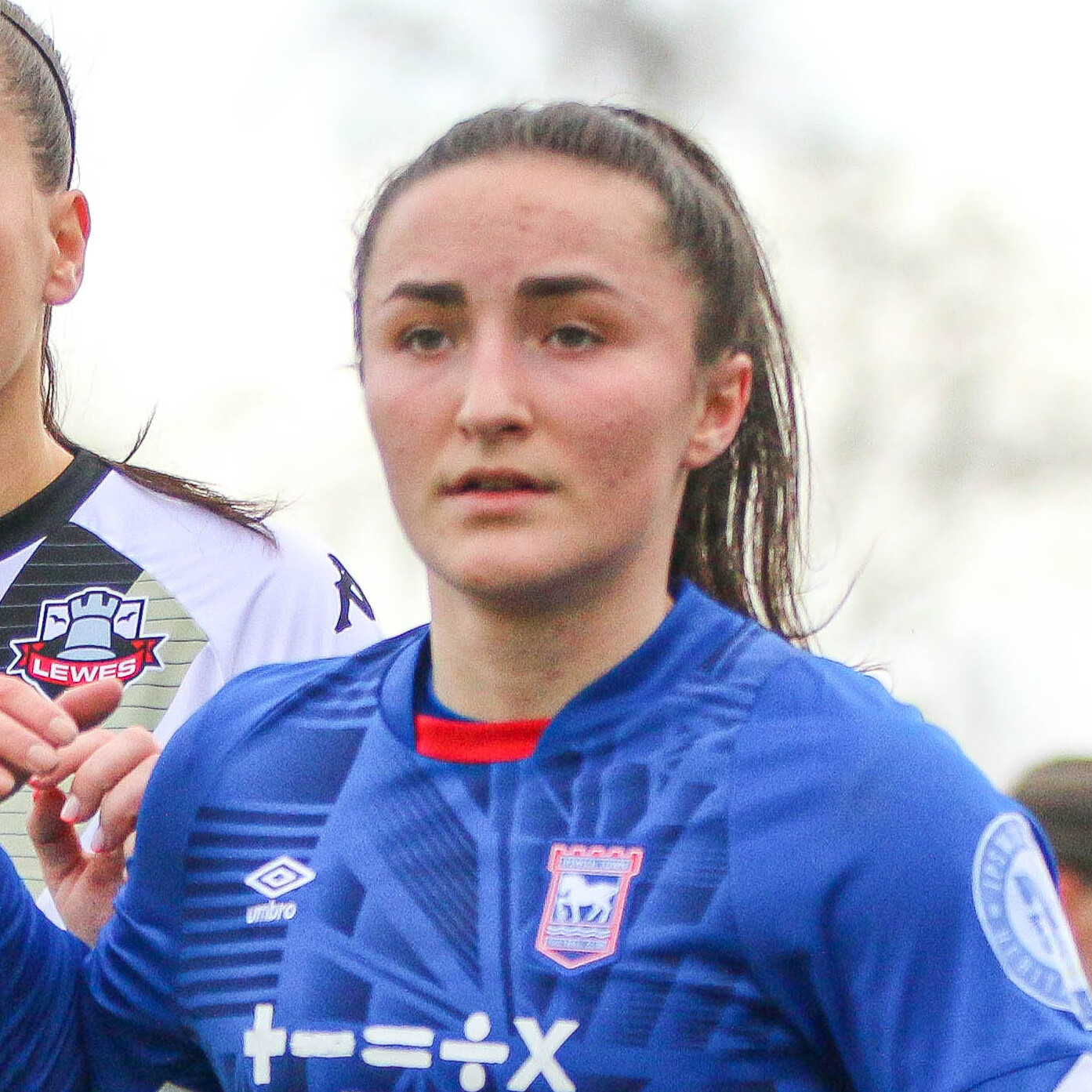
- Peskett in 2023

Personal information
- Full name: Sophie Jessica Peskett
- Date of birth: 5 November 2002 (age 24)
- Position: Winger

Team information
- Current team: Brighton & Hove Albion
- Number: 27

Youth career
- –2019: Essex Regional Talent Club
- –2019: Ipswich Town

Senior career*
Years	Team	Apps	(Gls)
2019–2026	Ipswich Town	107	(51)
2026–	Brighton & Hove Albion	7	(1)

International career
- England U19
- * Club domestic league appearances and goals as of 22 November 2026

Sophie Jessica Peskett (born 5 November 2002) is an English professional footballer who plays as a winger for Women's Super League team Brighton & Hove Albion. She previously played for Ipswich Town, where she was the first women's player to sign a professional contract.

== Early life ==
Peskett was born on 5 November 2002. She attended The John Warner School in Hoddesdon, Hertfordshire, where she was the captain of the football team. During her time there, she became the school's leading goal scorer. Peskett also played for the England U15 Schoolgirls' team.

Peskett studied for her A-levels at St Joseph's College as part of a partnership between her club, Ipswich Town, and the school.

== Youth career ==
At under-14 and under-16 level, Peskett played for the Hertfordshire SFA (School's FA). In 2019, Peskett joined Ipswich Town's WSL Academy side from the Essex Regional Talent Club.

Peskett represented England up to the under-19 level.

== Senior career ==
=== Ipswich Town, 2019–2026 ===
==== 2019–2021 ====
Aged 16, Peskett made her debut for Ipswich Town on the opening day of the 2019–20 season. She scored 16 times in her first 26 appearances for the club.

On 11 June 2021, Peskett signed a two-year contract with Ipswich Town, becoming the club's first professional women's player. In September 2021, she suffered a knee injury which was later confirmed to be a torn anterior cruciate ligament. Peskett underwent surgery for the injury in November 2021.

==== 2022–2023 ====
In November 2022, Peskett returned to play, providing an assist in her first game back as Ipswich defeated Luton Town 7–0.

==== 2023–2024 ====
Peskett was named FA Women's National League Southern Premier Division Player of the Year in April 2024. She was also awarded Ipswich Town's Women's Player of the Year and received the league's Golden Boot award.

==== 2024–2025 ====
In October 2024, Peskett scored four goals in 32 minutes as Ipswich secured a 13–0 victory over MK Dons. In her first six games of the season, she recorded eight goals and eight assists.

Peskett was named Ipswich Town's Women's Player of the Month in August 2024 and April 2025. In May 2025, she was named FAWNL Southern Premier Division Player of the Year, her second consecutive year receiving the honour, and also secured her second consecutive Golden Boot.

In June 2025, following Ipswich's promotion to the Women's Super League 2, Peskett was offered a new contract with the club.

==== 2025–2026 ====
Peskett was nominated for Barclays Women’s Super League 2 Player of the Month award for February, following an unbeaten month for Ipswich in which Peskett contributed two goals. In March 2025, she made her 100th appearance for Ipswich.

Following the season, her first in the second-tier of English women's football, Peskett was named Ipswich Town's Player of the Year, Player's Player of the Year, and achieved the joint-highest number of goals and the highest goal contributions for the team.

=== Brighton & Hove Albion, from 2026 ===
On 7 July 2026, Peskett joined Women's Super League side Brighton & Hove Albion. Her signing commanded a women's club record fee for Ipswich Town.

== Personal life ==
In 2024, Peskett graduated from the University of Suffolk with a first-class degree in Sports and Exercise Science.

== Career statistics ==
As of match played 22 November 2026

Appearances and goals by club, season and competition
Club	Season	League			Cup (Note: Includes the Women's FA Cup)		League Cup (Note: Includes the Women's County Cup, Women's National League Plate,Women's National League Cup, and WSL Players Cup/Women's League Cup)		Total	
Club	Season	Division	Apps	Goals	Apps	Goals	Apps	Goals	Apps	Goals
Ipswich Town	2019–20	WNL South East	13	8	5	3	0	0	18	11
Ipswich Town	2020–21	WNL South East	4	3	2	2	— (Note: Not contested due to the COVID-19 pandemic)		6	5
Ipswich Town	2021–22 (Note: Peskett suffered a season-ending injury in September 2021)	WNL Southern	14	2	4	0	0	0	18	2
Ipswich Town	2022–23 (Note: Peskett returned from injury in November 2022)	WNL Southern	9	2	1	0	0	0	10	2
Ipswich Town	2023–24	WNL Southern	22	8	3	3	3	1	28	12
Ipswich Town	2024–25	WNL Southern	24	23	3	2	2	1	29	26
Ipswich Town	2025–26	WSL 2	21	5	1	0	2	0	25	5
Ipswich Town	Total		107	51	19	10	7	2	134	63
Brighton & Hove Albion	2026–27	WSL	7	1	0	0	4	1	11	2
Career total			114	52	19	10	11	3	145	65

== Honours ==
- Ipswich Town Women's Player of the Year: 2023–24, 2024–25, 2025–26
- Ipswich Town Women's Player's Player of the Year: 2025–26
- FA Women's National League Souther Premier Division Player of the Year: 2023–24, 2024–25
- FA Women's National League Souther Premier Division Golden Boot: 2023–24, 2024–25
- Philip-Hope Cobbold Award: 2023
