= Olivia García =

American soccer player (born 2003)

Personal information
- Full name: Olivia Elizabethann García
- Date of birth: September 3, 2003 (age 23)
- Height: 5 ft 7 in (1.70 m)
- Position: Forward

Team information
- Current team: Brighton & Hove Albion
- Number: 21

Youth career
- Las Vegas Premier
- Utah Royals FC AZ

College career
Years	Team	Apps	(Gls)
2022–2023	Florida State Seminoles	38	(7)

Senior career*
Years	Team	Apps	(Gls)
2022	Kansas City Current II	–	(–)
2024–2025	HB Køge	48	(24)
2026–	Brighton & Hove Albion	11	(2)
2026	→ AIK (loan)	11	(7)
- * Club domestic league appearances and goals as of 22 November 2026

Olivia Elizabethann García (born September 3, 2003) is an American professional soccer player who plays as a forward for Women's Super League club Brighton & Hove Albion. She played college soccer for the Florida State Seminoles, winning the 2023 national championship. She began her professional career with HB Køge and was the Danish club's Player of the Year in 2024.

== Early life ==
García grew up in Las Vegas, the daughter of Juan Carlos and Lynne García. She is of Cuban descent through her father (who fled Cuba in the 1960s after the Cuban Revolution) and Spanish descent through her paternal grandfather and is fluent in both English and Spanish. She played club soccer for Las Vegas Premier Sports Academy and Utah Royals FC Arizona, leading the former to the USYS under-14 national title in 2017. She attended Cimarron-Memorial High School, where she ran cross country. In her senior year in 2021, she won the NIAA Class 4A cross country state championship and was named the Nevada Gatorade Player of the Year in the sport. She committed to play college soccer for the Florida State Seminoles in her junior year. Before college, she spent the summer with the Kansas City Current II in the Women's Premier Soccer League (WPSL).

== College career ==
García played in 20 games, starting 4, and scored 3 goals for the Florida State Seminoles as a freshman in 2022. She helped the Seminoles win their fourth consecutive ACC tournament and reach the NCAA tournament semifinals, losing to North Carolina. In her sophomore year in 2023, she played in 18 games, starting 2, and scored 4 goals. She scored twice during the NCAA tournament as the Seminoles finished the season undefeated and won their fourth national title, defeating Stanford in the final. After two seasons in Tallahassee, she decided to turn professional and give up her remaining college eligibility.

== Club career ==
=== HB Køge ===
Danish Women's League club HB Køge announced on February 5, 2024, that they had signed García to her first professional contract on a two-year deal. She scored two goals in her professional debut in a 3–1 win against AGF on March 17. She ended the season with 5 goals in 10 games as HB Køge finished third in the league.

On October 20, 2024, García scored her first professional hat trick in a 5–0 win over Kolding IF. Having scored 13 goals during her first year with HB Køge, she was named the club's Female Player of the Year. She finished the season with 18 goals in 24 games, second in the league behind Fortuna Hjørring's Joy Omewa. She accounted for a majority of HB Køge's league goals (51%) as they again placed third. She came third in the voting for the Danish Women's League Player of the Year behind AGF's Signe Baattrup and winner Omewa.

On October 8, 2025, García scored her first continental goal in qualifying for the inaugural UEFA Women's Europa Cup, striking from outside the box in a 2–1 home win over Glasgow City; HB Køge were eliminated following the away leg in Glasgow. She departed from HB Køge at the end of the year, having scored 28 goals in 57 games in two years at the club.

=== Brighton & Hove Albion ===
==== Loan to AIK ====
On February 2, 2026, García signed with Women's Super League club Brighton & Hove Albion. She was immediately sent on loan to Damallsvenskan club AIK. She made a goalscoring debut for the Swedish side two weeks later, equalizing in a 2–1 win over Gefle in the Swedish Women's Cup. On April 5, she scored her first league goal for the club to secure a 2–1 win over Rosengård in added time. When the loan ended on June 30, she had scored 7 goals in 11 league appearances, leading the Damallsvenskan in scoring alongside BK Häcken's Felicia Schröder.

==== Return to Brighton ====
On September 6, 2026, García debuted for Brighton in their season-opening 1–0 defeat to Arsenal, coming on as a second-half substitute for Marisa Olislagers. A week later, she scored her first goal for the club in a 2–2 draw with Birmingham City.

== International career ==
Under FIFA eligibility rules, García is eligible to represent Cuba, Spain, or the United States. In January 2026, she indicated that she was still pushing for a spot on the United States national team despite there being "so much talent in the US". When asked about her thoughts on playing for Cuba, she admitted it was a "complicated situation" due to her father having fled the country's communist regime, though nevertheless said she was "still counting on it" and that "maybe one day in the future it opens up". She was also in the process of acquiring a Spanish passport, which would make her eligible to play for Spain.

== Career statistics ==
=== Club ===
As of match played 22 November 2026.

Appearances and goals by club, season and competition
Club	Season	League			National cup		League cup		Continental		Total	
Club	Season	Division	Apps	Goals	Apps	Goals	Apps	Goals	Apps	Goals	Apps	Goals
HB Køge	2023–24	Danish Women's League	10	5	0	0	—		—		10	5
HB Køge	2024–25	Danish Women's League	24	17	1 (Note: Appearances in Danish Women's Cup)	0	—		—		25	17
HB Køge	2025–26	A-Liga	14	2	2	0	—		4 (Note: Appearances in UEFA Women's Europa Cup)	1	20	3
HB Køge	Total		48	24	3	0	—		4	1	55	25
Brighton & Hove Albion	2025–26	Women's Super League	0	0	0	0	0	0	—		0	0
Brighton & Hove Albion	2026–27	Women's Super League	11	2	0	0	5 (Note: Appearances in FA Women's League Cup)	1	—		16	3
Brighton & Hove Albion	Total		11	2	0	0	5	1	—		16	3
AIK (loan)	2026	Damallsvenskan	11	7	3 (Note: Appearances in Svenska Cupen)	1	—		—		14	8
Career total			70	33	6	1	5	1	4	1	85	36

== Honors and awards ==
Florida State Seminoles

- NCAA Division I women's soccer tournament: 2023
- ACC women's soccer tournament: 2022, 2023
- Atlantic Coast Conference: 2022, 2023

Individual

- HB Køge Female Player of the Year: 2024
