= Waterhall =

Local nature reserve in Brighton, England

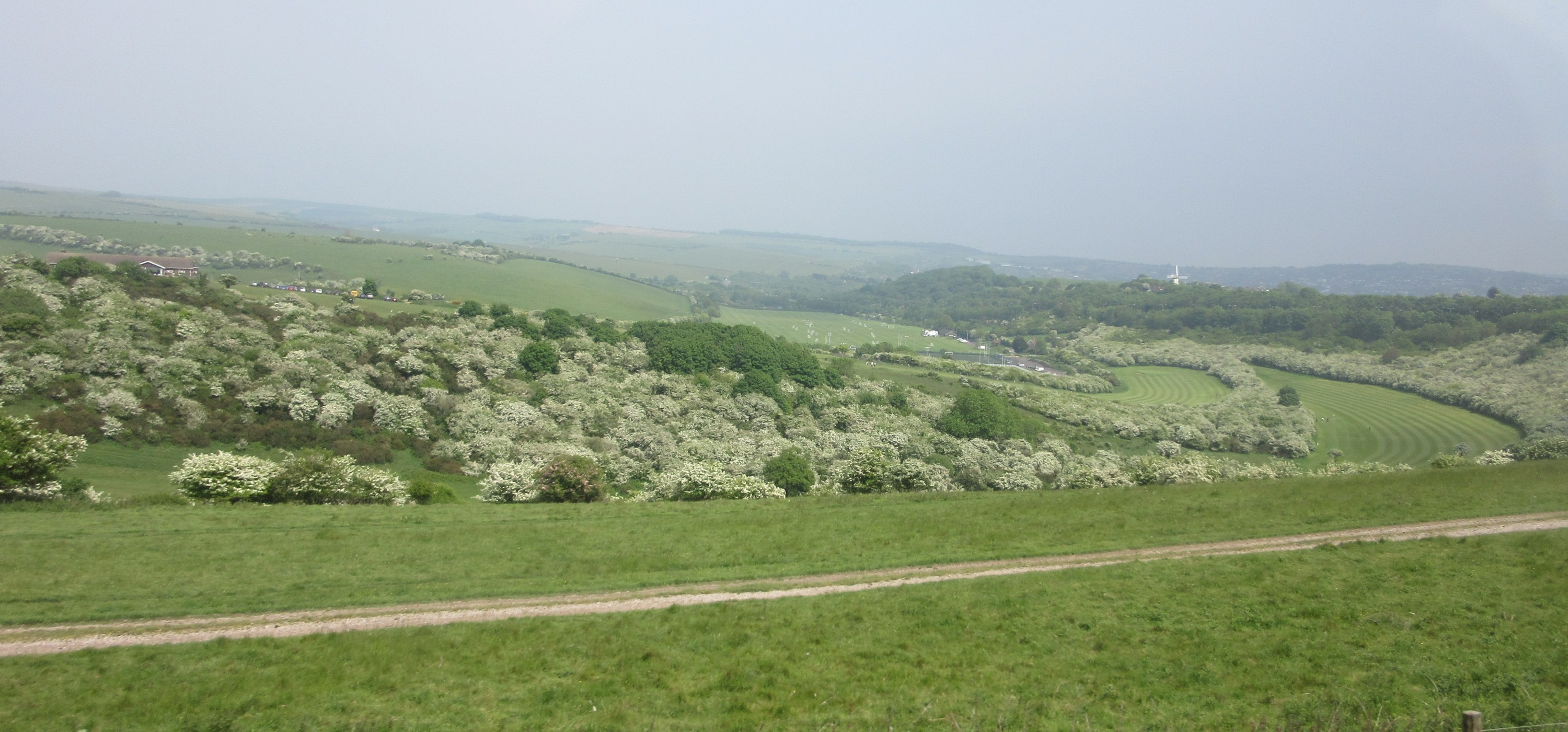
- Waterhall from the Saddlescombe Road
- Interactive map of Waterhall
- Type: Local Nature Reserve
- Location: Brighton, East Sussex
- Area: 90 hectares (220 acres)
- Manager: Brighton and Hove City Council

Waterhall is a 90-hectare (220-acre) Local Nature Reserve in Brighton, East Sussex. It is owned and managed by Brighton and Hove City Council.

At the site Brighton Hove City Council are working to restore the rare chalk grassland. Chalk grassland was the reason the South Downs was designated as a National Park. The Waterhall Wilding scheme hopes to connect local residents and communities with the importance of this natural treasure on Brighton and Hove's doorstep.

Waterhall was a Council golf course, but the natural effect of grazing animals will return the site to nature and allow the biodiversity that lives on chalk grassland to use it to its full potential. The area will also include biodiverse native scrub, woodland, and dew ponds.

Wild flowers on the site include orchids, cowslips, yellow rock rose, purple knapweeds and harebells and chalk grassland butterflies, including silver spotted skipper and adonis blue.
