= Women's Super League Golden Boot =

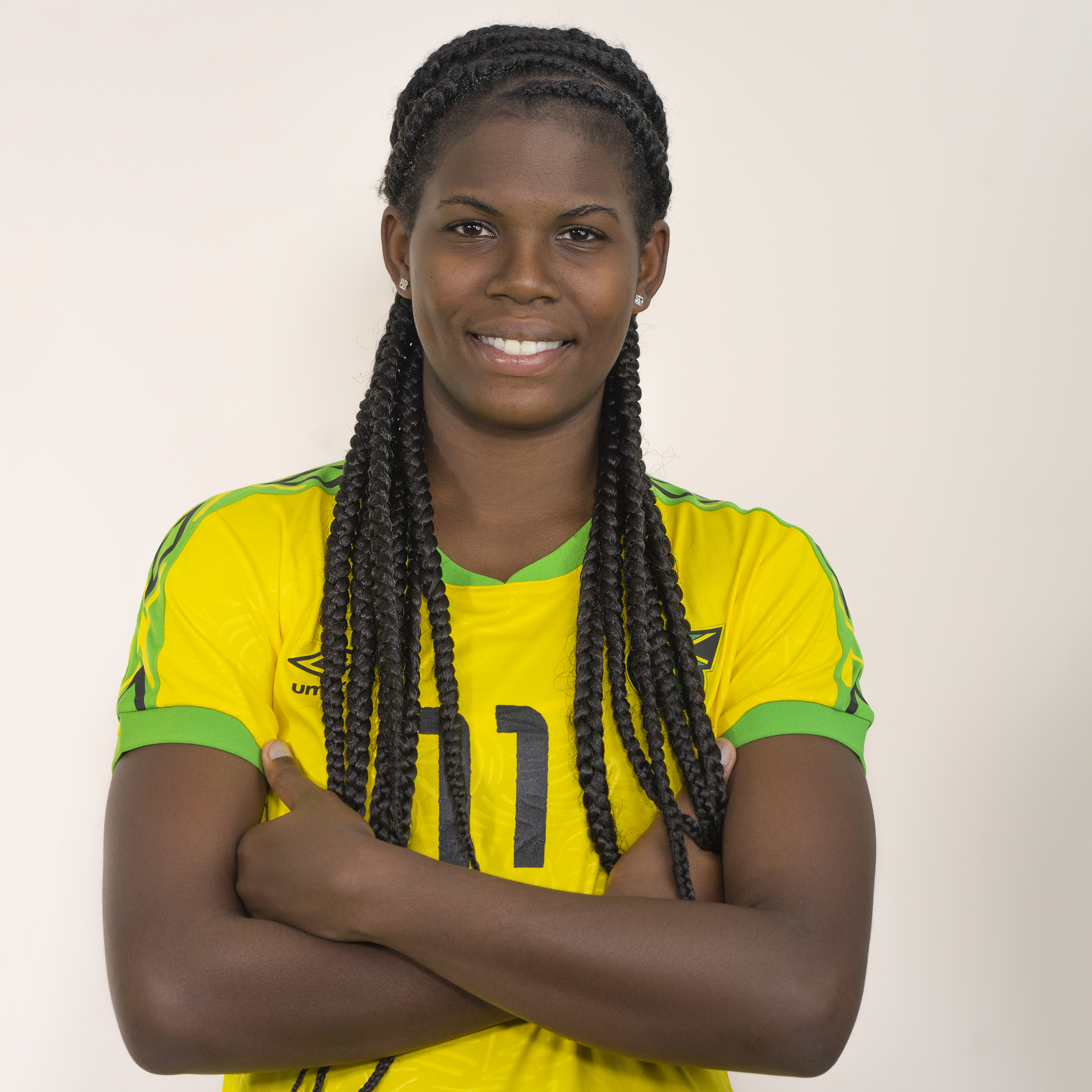
- Khadija Shaw is the current holder
- Awarded for: Leading goalscorer in the Women's Super League, England's top women's football league
- Presented by: Barclays
- First award: 2011
- Currently held by: (Jamaica) Khadija Shaw (3rd win)

Highlights
- Most wins: (Jamaica) Khadija Shaw (3 wins)
- Most team wins: Arsenal; Chelsea (4 each)

The Women's Super League Golden Boot is an annual association football award presented to the leading goalscorer in Women's Super League (WSL). The award is sponsored by Barclays. Khadija Shaw, the most recent winner, has won the award for the third consecutive season, after scoring 21 goals in the 2025–26 season.

The record for the most goals in a season is 22 held by Rachel Daly for Aston Villa in the 2022–23 season, and Vivianne Miedema for Arsenal in the 2018–19 season. Miedema and Sam Kerr are the only players to have won the Golden Boot twice.

== Winners ==
Key
Player (X)	Name of the player and number of times they had won the award at that point (if more than one)
Games	The number of WSL games played by the winner that season
Rate	The winner's goals-to-games ratio that season
†	Indicates multiple award winners in the same season
§	Denotes the club were WSL champions in the same season
#	WSL record

WSL Golden Boot winners
Season	Player	Nationality	Club	Goals	Games	Rate	Ref(s)
2011	Rachel Williams	England	Birmingham	14	14	1	
2012	Kim Little	Scotland	Arsenal §	11	14	0.79	
2013	Natasha Dowie	England	Liverpool §	19	21	0.9	
2014	Karen Carney	England	Birmingham	8	16	0.5	
2015	Beth Mead	England	Sunderland	12	18	0.67	
2016	Eniola Aluko	England	Chelsea	9	16	0.56	
Spring Series	Fran Kirby	England	Chelsea §	6	5	1.2	
2017–18	Ellen White	England	Birmingham City	15	14	1.07	
2018–19	Vivianne Miedema	Netherlands	Arsenal §	22 #	20	1.1	
2019–20	Vivianne Miedema (2)	Netherlands	Arsenal	16	14	1.14	
2020–21	Sam Kerr	Australia	Chelsea §	21	22	0.95	
2021–22	Sam Kerr (2)	Australia	Chelsea §	20	20	1	
2022–23	Rachel Daly	England	Aston Villa	22 #	22	1	
2023–24	Khadija Shaw	Jamaica	Manchester CIty	21	18	1.36	
2024–25†	Alessia Russo	England	Arsenal	12	21	0.57	
2024–25†	Khadija Shaw (2)	Jamaica	Manchester CIty	12	14	0.86	
2025–26	Khadija Shaw (3)	Jamaica	Manchester CIty §	21	22	0.95	

== See also ==
- Premier League Golden Boot – the equivalent award in men's football
- Women's Super League Player of the Season
- Women's Super League Golden Glove
- List of sports awards honoring women
- The FA Women's Football Awards
