= 2022–23 West Ham United F.C. Women season =

West Ham United
2022–23 season
- Head Coach: Paul Konchesky
- Stadium: Victoria Road, Dagenham
- Women's Super League: 8th
- FA Cup: Fifth round
- League Cup: Semi-final
- Top goalscorer: League: Viviane Asseyi and Dagný Brynjarsdóttir (6); All: Dagný Brynjarsdóttir (11)
- Highest home attendance: 2,832 (vs. Arsenal, 5 February)
- Lowest home attendance: 1,038 (vs. Leicester City, 20 November)
- Average home league attendance: 1,544
Home colours	Away colours	Third colours

The 2022–23 West Ham United F.C. Women season was the club's 32nd season in existence and their fifth in the Women's Super League, the highest level of the football pyramid. Along with competing in the WSL, the club also contested two domestic cup competitions: the FA Cup and the League Cup.

On 8 May 2022, following the final game of the 2021–22 season, it was announced head coach Olli Harder had informed the club of his resignation to pursue new opportunities. Assistant manager Paul Konchesky was immediately announced as his successor on a two-year contract. On 28 May 2023, one day after the team's final game of the season, Konchesky was sacked.

== Squad ==
As of 31 January 2023

Note: Flags indicate national team as defined under FIFA eligibility rules; some limited exceptions apply. Players may hold more than one non-FIFA nationality.

No.	Pos.	Nation	Player
1	GK	AUS	Mackenzie Arnold
2	DF	SCO	Kirsty Smith
3	DF	JPN	Risa Shimizu
4	MF	ENG	Abbey-Leigh Stringer
5	DF	BEL	Amber Tysiak
7	MF	SCO	Lisa Evans
8	MF	DEN	Emma Snerle
10	MF	ISL	Dagný Brynjarsdóttir (captain)
11	MF	IRL	Izzy Atkinson
12	MF	ENG	Kate Longhurst
14	FW	DEN	Amalie Thestrup (on loan from PSV)
15	DF	ENG	Lucy Parker
16	MF	IRL	Jessica Ziu
17	MF	ENG	Melisa Filis

No.	Pos.	Nation	Player
18	DF	ENG	Anouk Denton
19	MF	JPN	Honoka Hayashi
21	DF	ENG	Shannon Cooke
22	DF	ENG	Grace Fisk
23	DF	FRA	Hawa Cissoko
24	MF	ENG	Brooke Cairns
26	FW	FRA	Viviane Asseyi
27	DF	ENG	Maisy Barker
28	GK	ENG	Sophie Hillyerd
33	MF	ENG	Halle Houssein
41	MF	ENG	Keira Flannery
49	MF	AUS	Milly Boughton
60	FW	ENG	Princess Ademiluyi

== Preseason ==
23 July 2022 Friendly	Billericay Town	1–5	West Ham United	Billericay
	Jones (pen.)	Report	Hennessy; Walker; Hasegawa; Filis	Stadium: New Lodge

27 July 2022 Friendly	Enfield Town	2–11	West Ham United	Enfield
	Huggs; Cann	Report	Hennessy; Hasegawa; Paton (o.g.); Walker; Flannery	Stadium: Queen Elizabeth II Stadium

3 August 2022 Friendly	Hashtag United	3–1	West Ham United	Aveley
	Samways; Adamson	Report	Chitolie-Porter	Stadium: Parkside; Attendance: 346

7 August 2022 Friendly	Lewes	2–1	West Ham United	Hassocks
	Kraft	Report	Fisk	Stadium: The Beacon

14 August 2022 Friendly	Charlton Athletic	1–2	West Ham United	Crayford
	Logan	Report	Hasegawa	Stadium: Oakwood

21 August 2022 Friendly	Liverpool	5–0	West Ham United	Loughborough
	Stengel; van de Sanden; Kiernan	Report		Stadium: Loughborough University

== Women's Super League ==
=== Results summary ===
Overall								Home						Away					
Pld	W	D	L	GF	GA	GD	Pts	W	D	L	GF	GA	GD	W	D	L	GF	GA	GD
22	6	3	13	23	44	−21	21	3	3	5	12	18	−6	3	0	8	11	26	−15

Last updated: 27 May 2023.
Source: WSL

=== Results by matchday ===
Round	1	2	3	4	5	6	7	8	9	10	11	12	13	14	15	16	17	18	19	20	21	22
Ground	H	H	A	A	H	A	H	H	A	A	H	A	H	A	H	A	H	A	A	H	A	H
Result	W	L	L	W	W	L	L	W	L	W	L	L	D	L	L	L	D	L	L	L	W	D
Position	6	6	9	6	5	7	8	6	6	5	6	7	7	7	7	7	7	8	8	8	8	8

A = Away; H = Home; W = Win; D = Draw; L = Loss

=== Results ===
11 September 2022	Chelsea	P–P	West Ham United	Fulham
12:30				Stadium: Stamford Bridge
Note: The FA postponed all of the weekend's football fixtures following the death of Elizabeth II on 8 September 2022.

18 September 2022 1	West Ham United	1–0	Everton	Dagenham
15:00	Cissoko (yellow card) 43'; Evans 45'; Brynjarsdóttir (yellow card) 57'	Report		Stadium: Victoria Road; Attendance: 1,118; Referee: Lauren Impey

25 September 2022 2	West Ham United	0–2	Manchester United	Dagenham
15:00		Report	Blundell (yellow card) 14', (goal) 55'; García 50'; Russo (yellow card) 63'; Turner (yellow card) 70'	Stadium: Victoria Road; Attendance: 2,104; Referee: Emily Heaslip

28 September 2022 3	Chelsea	3–1	West Ham United	Kingston upon Thames
19:05	Kirby 40'; Kerr 58'; Bright 62'	Report	Brynjarsdóttir 3'; Cissoko (yellow card) 48'; Ziu (yellow card) 74'; Parker (yellow card) 76'	Stadium: Kingsmeadow; Attendance: 2,842; Referee: Tom Reeves
Note: Rescheduled from 11 September and moved from Stamford Bridge to Kingsmeadow.

15 October 2022 4	Aston Villa	1–2	West Ham United	Walsall
12:30	Dali 77'; Mayling (yellow card) 90+1'	Report	Brynjarsdóttir 2'; Hayashi 14'; Arnold (yellow card) 32'; Snerle (yellow card) 75'; Cissoko (red card) 90+1'	Stadium: Bescot Stadium; Attendance: 1,753; Referee: Cheryl Foster

23 October 2022 5	West Ham United	3–2	Reading	Dagenham
15:00	Brynjarsdóttir 4'; Asseyi 22', 29'; Evans (yellow card) 61'; Stringer (yellow card) 77'	Report	Evans (yellow card) 35'; Cooper (yellow card) 59'; Wellings 75', (yellow card) 79'; Troelsgaard 82' (pen.)	Stadium: Victoria Road; Attendance: 1,041; Referee: Lauren Impey

30 October 2022 6	Arsenal	3–1	West Ham United	Borehamwood
18:45	Nobbs 42'; Blackstenius 53'; Maanum	Report	Brynjarsdóttir 35'; Longhurst (yellow card) 52'; Kyvåg (yellow card) 57'; Filis (yellow card) 84'	Stadium: Meadow Park; Attendance: 3,988; Referee: Abigail Byrne

6 November 2022 7	West Ham United	4–5	Brighton & Hove Albion	Dagenham
15:00	Evans 3'; Filis (yellow card) 53'; Stringer (yellow card) 61'; Williams 61' (o.g.); Asseyi 85', 86'	Report	Carter 8', 20' (pen.); Sarri 11'; Zigiotti Olme (yellow card) 45+3'; Green (yellow card) 59'; Terland 68'; Fox 71'	Stadium: Victoria Road; Attendance: 1,129; Referee: Emily Heaslip

20 November 2022 8	West Ham United	1–0	Leicester City	Dagenham
15:00	Walker (yellow card) 46'; Asseyi (yellow card) 56'; Atkinson 88'	Report		Stadium: Victoria Road; Attendance: 1,038; Referee: Louise Saunders

4 December 2022 9	Liverpool	2–0	West Ham United	Birkenhead
14:00	Holland 3'; Stengel 20'	Report		Stadium: Prenton Park; Attendance: 1,075; Referee: Neil Hair

11 December 2022 10	Tottenham Hotspur	0–2	West Ham United	Leyton
14:00		Report	Fisk (yellow card) 32'; Brynjarsdóttir 49'; Stringer (yellow card) 82'; Cissoko 83'; Longhurst (yellow card) 89'	Stadium: Brisbane Road; Attendance: 1,391; Referee: Richie Watkins

15 January 2023 11	West Ham United	0–1	Manchester City	Dagenham
18:45		Report	Shaw 50'; Ouahabi (yellow card) 74'	Stadium: Victoria Road; Attendance: 1,586; Referee: Amy Fearn

22 January 2023 12	Everton	3–0	West Ham United	Liverpool
14:00	K. Holmgaard 3'; Finnigan 12'; Beever-Jones 70'	Report		Stadium: Walton Hall Park; Attendance: 584; Referee: Tom Nield

5 February 2023 13	West Ham United	0–0	Arsenal	Dagenham
18:45	Stringer (yellow card) 42'	Report		Stadium: Victoria Road; Attendance: 2,832; Referee: Richie Watkins

5 March 2023 14	Reading	2–1	West Ham United	Reading
14:00	Wellings 66'; Rowe 85'	Report	Parker (yellow card) 57'; Asseyi 76'	Stadium: Madejski Stadium; Attendance: 1,125; Referee: Lisa Benn

12 March 2023 15	West Ham United	1–2	Aston Villa	Dagenham
15:00	Hayashi (yellow card) 22'; Asseyi 79'	Report	Daly 34'; Nobbs 62'; Littlejohn (yellow card) 85'	Stadium: Victoria Road; Attendance: 1,204; Referee: James Bell

25 March 2023 16	Manchester United	4–0	West Ham United	Leigh
17:30	Zelem 52' (pen.); García 65', 90+1'; Ladd 84'	Report		Stadium: Leigh Sports Village; Attendance: 27,919; Referee: Emily Heaslip

2 April 2023 17	West Ham United	0–0	Liverpool	Dagenham
17:00		Report	Holland (yellow card) 35'; van de Sanden (yellow card) 90+1'	Stadium: Victoria Road; Attendance: 2,014; Referee: Jane Simms

23 April 2023 18	Manchester City	6–2	West Ham United	Manchester
18:45	Kelly 6', 7'; Coombs 25'; Shaw 62'; Houghton 65'; Fowler 82'	Report	Snerle 11'; Evans 72'; Asseyi (yellow card) 83'	Stadium: Academy Stadium; Attendance: 2,649; Referee: Jane Simms

30 April 2023	West Ham United	P–P	Chelsea	Dagenham
				Stadium: Victoria Road
Note: Postponed due to Chelsea's participation in the UEFA Women's Champions League

7 May 2023 19	Brighton & Hove Albion	1–0	West Ham United	Crawley
14:00	Connolly (yellow card) 5'; Green 57'; Terland (yellow card) 69'	Report	Parker (yellow card) 88'	Stadium: Broadfield Stadium; Attendance: 2,952; Referee: Amy Fearn

17 May 2023 20	West Ham United	0–4	Chelsea	Dagenham
20:15	Cissoko (yellow card) 28'	Report	Charles 13'; Harder 48'; Ingle 64'; Cuthbert 90+3'	Stadium: Victoria Road; Attendance: 1,373; Referee: Louise Saunders
Note: Rescheduled from 30 April

21 May 2023 21	Leicester City	1–2	West Ham United	Leicester
15:00	Mace (yellow card) 39' (yellow-red card) 90+4'; Cain 90+9' (pen.)	Report	Howard 18' (o.g.); Parker (yellow card) 45+7'; Brynjarsdóttir 60' (pen.); Fisk (yellow card) 71'; Longhurst (yellow card) 86'	Stadium: King Power Stadium; Attendance: 4,023; Referee: Lisa Benn

27 May 2023 22	West Ham United	2–2	Tottenham Hotspur	Dagenham
14:30	Snerle 38'; Graham 44' (o.g.)	Report	England 20', 48'; Spence (yellow card) 61'; Harrop (yellow card) 88'; Summanen (yellow card) 90'	Stadium: Victoria Road; Attendance: 2,084; Referee: Stacey Pearson

=== League table ===
Pos	Team	Pld	W	D	L	GF	GA	GD	Pts
6	Everton	22	9	3	10	29	36	−7	30
7	Liverpool	22	6	5	11	24	39	−15	23
8	West Ham United	22	6	3	13	23	44	−21	21
9	Tottenham Hotspur	22	5	3	14	31	47	−16	18
10	Leicester City	22	5	1	16	15	48	−33	16

Source: Women's Super League
Rules for classification: 1) Points; 2) Goal difference; 3) Number of goals scored.

== Women's FA Cup ==
As a member of the first tier, West Ham entered the FA Cup in the fourth round proper.

29 January 2023 Fourth round	Wolverhampton Wanderers	0–2	West Ham United	Telford
14:00	Holmes (yellow card) 62'	Report	Brynjarsdóttir 71'; Johnson 76' (o.g.)	Stadium: New Bucks Head; Attendance: 1,692; Referee: Nicoleta Bria

26 February 2023 Fifth round	West Ham United	1–1 (a.e.t.) (6–7 p)	Aston Villa	Dagenham
15:00	Brynjarsdóttir 90+2'; Asseyi (yellow card) 90+4'; Smith (yellow card) 95'; Cissoko (yellow card) 105+2'; Longhurst (yellow card) 110'; Filis (yellow card) 114'	Report	Daly 50'; Corsie (yellow card) 74'; Mayling (yellow card) 87'	Stadium: Victoria Road; Attendance: 832; Referee: Lisa Benn
	Penalties
	Brynjarsdóttir (penalty scored); Fisk (penalty missed); Filis (penalty scored); Asseyi (penalty scored); Atkinson (penalty scored); Shimizu (penalty scored); Flannery (penalty scored); Arnold (penalty missed)		(penalty scored) Mayling; (penalty scored) Staniforth; (penalty scored) Gielnik; (penalty missed) Nobbs; (penalty scored) Pacheco; (penalty scored) Gregory; (penalty scored) Corsie; (penalty scored) Hampton

== FA Women's League Cup ==
=== Group stage ===
2 October 2022 Group stage	London City Lionesses	2–2 (9–10 p)	West Ham United	Dartford
14:00	Heuchan 26'; Nolan (yellow card) 52'; Ewens 62'	Report	Brynjarsdóttir (yellow card) 38', (goal) 90+4'; Asseyi 67'	Stadium: Princes Park
	Penalties
	Hopcroft (penalty scored); Agg (penalty scored); Joel (penalty missed); Nolan (penalty scored); Yanez (penalty missed); Primus (penalty scored); Neville (penalty scored); Bennett (penalty missed); Shepherd (penalty scored); Muya (penalty scored); Girasoli (penalty scored); Hopcroft (penalty scored); Agg (penalty missed)		(penalty missed) Longhurst; (penalty scored) Asseyi; (penalty scored) Filis; (penalty missed) Evans; (penalty scored) Brynjarsdóttir; (penalty scored) Fisk; (penalty scored) Shimizu; (penalty missed) Smith; (penalty scored) Hayashi; (penalty scored) Kyvåg; (penalty scored) Arnold; (penalty scored) Filis; (penalty scored) Brynjarsdóttir

27 November 2022 Group stage	West Ham United	2–0	Birmingham City	Dagenham
15:00	Longhurst 12'; Brynjarsdóttir 75' (pen.)	Report		Stadium: Victoria Road

17 December 2022 Group stage	Brighton & Hove Albion	P–P	West Ham United	Crawley
12:00				Stadium: Broadfield Stadium
Note: Postponed due to frozen pitch.

18 January 2023 Group stage	Brighton & Hove Albion	0–0 (3–0 p)	West Ham United	Crawley
19:30	Morse (yellow card) 14'	Report	Asseyi (yellow card) 35'; Longhurst (yellow card) 60'	Stadium: Broadfield Stadium; Attendance: 1,005
	Penalties
	Symonds (penalty scored); Williams (penalty scored); Fox (penalty scored)		(penalty missed) Filis; (penalty missed) Fisk; (penalty missed) Houssein
Note: Rescheduled from 17 December 2022.

Pos	Team	Pld	W	WPEN	LPEN	L	GF	GA	GD	Pts	Qualification	WHU	BHA	LCL	BIR
1	West Ham United	3	1	1	1	0	4	2	+2	6	Advanced to knock-out stage	—	–	–	2–0
2	Brighton & Hove Albion	3	1	1	0	1	4	4	0	5	Possible knock-out stage based on ranking	0–0	—	–	–
3	London City Lionesses	3	1	0	1	1	5	5	0	4		2–2	1–2	—	–
4	Birmingham City	3	1	0	0	2	4	6	−2	3		–	3–2	1–2	—

Rules for classification: 1) Points; 2) Goal difference; 3) Number of goals scored; 4) Number of wins; 5) Head-to-head record

=== Knockout stage ===
25 January 2023 Quarter-final	Liverpool	0–1	West Ham United	Birkenhead
19:30	Daniëls (yellow card) 72'; Campbell (yellow card) 90+7'	Report	Hayashi (yellow card) 75'; Brynjarsdóttir 87'	Stadium: Prenton Park; Attendance: 510; Referee: Martin Woods

9 February 2023 Semi-final	West Ham United	0–7	Chelsea	Dagenham
19:15		Report	Kerr 3', 22', 45+1', 60'; Kirby 10'; Eriksson (yellow card) 53'; James 55'; Reiten 65'	Stadium: Victoria Road; Attendance: 1,092; Referee: Louise Saunders

== Squad statistics ==
=== Appearances ===
As of 27 May 2023

Starting appearances are listed first, followed by substitute appearances after the + symbol where applicable.

No.	Pos	Nat	Player	Total		WSL		FA Cup		League Cup	
No.	Pos	Nat	Player	Apps	Goals	Apps	Goals	Apps	Goals	Apps	Goals
1	GK	(Australia) AUS	Mackenzie Arnold	27	0	20	0	2	0	5	0
2	DF	(Scotland) SCO	Kirsty Smith	29	0	19+3	0	1+1	0	4+1	0
3	DF	(Japan) JPN	Risa Shimizu	28	0	21+1	0	1	0	5	0
4	MF	(England) ENG	Abbey-Leigh Stringer	14	0	9+2	0	0	0	3	0
5	DF	(Belgium) BEL	Amber Tysiak	4	0	3+1	0	0	0	0	0
7	MF	(Scotland) SCO	Lisa Evans	28	3	16+6	3	1+1	0	2+2	0
8	MF	(Denmark) DEN	Emma Snerle	16	2	8+4	2	2	0	2	0
10	MF	(Iceland) ISL	Dagný Brynjarsdóttir	28	11	20+1	6	1+1	2	4+1	3
11	MF	(Republic of Ireland) IRL	Izzy Atkinson	21	1	2+14	1	1+1	0	3	0
12	MF	(England) ENG	Kate Longhurst	28	1	15+6	0	2	0	3+2	1
14	FW	(Denmark) DEN	Amalie Thestrup	12	0	6+4	0	1	0	0+1	0
15	DF	(England) ENG	Lucy Parker	18	0	12+2	0	1	0	1+2	0
16	MF	(Republic of Ireland) IRL	Jessica Ziu	4	0	2+1	0	0	0	1	0
17	MF	(England) ENG	Melisa Filis	16	0	3+6	0	1+1	0	3+2	0
18	DF	(England) ENG	Anouk Denton	6	0	3+2	0	0	0	0+1	0
19	MF	(Japan) JPN	Honoka Hayashi	27	1	19+2	1	1	0	4+1	0
21	DF	(England) ENG	Shannon Cooke	2	0	0+1	0	0	0	0+1	0
22	DF	(England) ENG	Grace Fisk	28	0	20+1	0	2	0	5	0
23	DF	(France) FRA	Hawa Cissoko	21	1	14+2	1	2	0	3	0
24	MF	(England) ENG	Brooke Cairns	0	0	0	0	0	0	0	0
26	FW	(France) FRA	Viviane Asseyi	29	7	22	6	1+1	0	5	1
27	DF	(England) ENG	Maisy Barker	0	0	0	0	0	0	0	0
28	GK	(England) ENG	Sophie Hillyerd	3	0	2+1	0	0	0	0	0
33	MF	(England) ENG	Halle Houssein	8	0	0+5	0	1	0	0+2	0
41	MF	(England) ENG	Keira Flannery	6	0	0+3	0	1+1	0	1	0
49	MF	(Australia) AUS	Milly Boughton	0	0	0	0	0	0	0	0
60	FW	(England) ENG	Princess Ademiluyi	2	0	0+2	0	0	0	0	0
Players who appeared for the club but left during the season:
9	FW	(England) ENG	Claudia Walker	10	0	2+6	0	0	0	1+1	0
20	FW	(Norway) NOR	Thea Kyvåg	12	0	4+6	0	0	0	0+2	0

== Transfers ==
=== Transfers in ===
Date	Position	Nationality	Name	From	Ref.
17 June 2022	MF	(England)	Halle Houssein	(England) Arsenal	
17 June 2022	MF	(Scotland)	Lisa Evans	(England) Arsenal	
1 July 2022	MF	(Republic of Ireland)	Jessica Ziu	(Republic of Ireland) Shelbourne	
15 July 2022	DF	(Scotland)	Kirsty Smith	(England) Manchester United	
16 July 2022	MF	(Republic of Ireland)	Izzy Atkinson	(Scotland) Celtic	
18 July 2022	GK	(England)	Sophie Hillyerd	(England) Charlton Athletic	
20 July 2022	FW	(England)	Alex Hennessy	(England) Arsenal	
22 July 2022	MF	(England)	Keira Flannery	(England) Arsenal	
2 August 2022	FW	(France)	Viviane Asseyi	(Germany) Bayern Munich	
3 August 2022	FW	(Norway)	Thea Kyvåg	(Norway) LSK Kvinner	
28 August 2022	DF	(Japan)	Risa Shimizu	(Japan) Tokyo Verdy Beleza	
8 September 2022	MF	(Japan)	Honoka Hayashi	(Sweden) AIK	
13 January 2023	DF	(Belgium)	Amber Tysiak	(Belgium) OH Leuven	
21 January 2023	DF	(England)	Anouk Denton	(United States) Louisville Cardinals	
31 January 2023	DF	(England)	Shannon Cooke	(United States) LSU Tigers	

=== Loans in ===
Date	Position	Nationality	Name	From	Until	Ref.
31 January 2023	FW	(Denmark)	Amalie Thestrup	(Netherlands) PSV	End of season	

=== Transfers out ===
Date	Position	Nationality	Name	To	Ref.
8 May 2022	DF	(England)	Gilly Flaherty	(England) Liverpool	
11 May 2022	DF	(England)	Lois Joel	(England) London City Lionesses	
11 May 2022	GK	(New Zealand)	Anna Leat	(England) Aston Villa	
11 May 2022	MF	(Czech Republic)	Kateřina Svitková	(England) Chelsea	
11 May 2022	MF	(United States)	Zaneta Wyne	(United States) Racing Louisville	
1 June 2022	GK	(Canada)	Emily Moore	(England) Lewes	
29 June 2022	FW	(Canada)	Adriana Leon	(England) Manchester United	
3 August 2022	MF	(Australia)	Tameka Yallop	(Norway) SK Brann	
8 September 2022	MF	(Japan)	Yui Hasegawa	(England) Manchester City	
3 January 2023	FW	(Norway)	Thea Kyvåg	(Norway) LSK Kvinner	
7 January 2023	FW	(England)	Claudia Walker	(England) Birmingham City	
7 January 2023	FW	(England)	Alex Hennessy	(England) Charlton Athletic	
9 January 2023	MF	(England)	Grace Garrad	(Norway) Stabæk	

=== Loans out ===
Date	Position	Nationality	Name	To	Until	Ref.
	MF	(England)	Brooke Cairns (Note: Dual registration)	(England) Hashtag United	10 January 2023	
19 August 2022	MF	(England)	Grace Garrad	(England) Watford	9 January 2023	
