= 2021–22 West Ham United F.C. Women season =

West Ham United
2021–22 season
- Head Coach: Olli Harder
- Stadium: Victoria Road, Dagenham
- FA WSL: 6th
- FA Cup: Semi-final
- League Cup: Quarter-final
- Top goalscorer: League: Dagný Brynjarsdóttir (4 goals); All: Dagný Brynjarsdóttir and Claudia Walker (6 goals)
- Highest home attendance: 2,585 (vs. Arsenal, 8 May)
- Lowest home attendance: League: 1,106 (vs. Aston Villa, 11 September); All: 615 (vs. Chelsea, 19 January, League Cup)
- Average home league attendance: 1,465
Home colours	Away colours	Third colours

The 2021–22 West Ham United F.C. Women season was the club's 31st season in existence and their fourth in the FA Women's Super League, the highest level of the football pyramid. Along with competing in the WSL, the club also contested two domestic cup competitions: the FA Cup and the League Cup.

On 20 May 2021, Jack Sullivan stepped down as managing director after four years in the job.

Following the final game of the season, it was announced Olli Harder had informed the club of his resignation to pursue new opportunities. Assistant manager Paul Konchesky was immediately announced as his successor on a two-year contract.

== Squad ==
As of 16 January 2022

Note: Flags indicate national team as defined under FIFA eligibility rules; some limited exceptions apply. Players may hold more than one non-FIFA nationality.

No.	Pos.	Nation	Player
1	GK	AUS	Mackenzie Arnold
2	MF	USA	Zaneta Wyne
4	MF	ENG	Abbey-Leigh Stringer
5	DF	ENG	Gilly Flaherty (captain)
7	MF	SCO	Lisa Evans (on loan from Arsenal)
8	MF	DEN	Emma Snerle
9	FW	ENG	Claudia Walker
10	MF	CZE	Kateřina Svitková
12	MF	ENG	Kate Longhurst
13	MF	AUS	Tameka Yallop
14	MF	JPN	Yui Hasegawa
15	DF	ENG	Lucy Parker

No.	Pos.	Nation	Player
17	MF	ENG	Melisa Filis
18	GK	NZL	Anna Leat
19	FW	CAN	Adriana Leon
20	DF	ENG	Lois Joel
22	DF	ENG	Grace Fisk
23	DF	FRA	Hawa Cissoko
24	MF	ENG	Brooke Cairns
25	MF	ENG	Grace Garrad
26	GK	CAN	Emily Moore
27	DF	ENG	Maisy Barker
32	MF	ISL	Dagný Brynjarsdóttir
33	MF	ENG	Halle Houssein (dual registration with Arsenal)

== Preseason ==
15 August 2021 Friendly	London City Lionesses	0–1	West Ham United	Dartford
14:00		Report	Filis 30'	Stadium: Princes Park; Attendance: Behind-closed-doors

22 August 2021 Friendly	Lewes	2–2	West Ham United	Lewes
14:00	Balfour 8', 32'	Report	Walker 51', 86'	Stadium: The Dripping Pan

== FA Women's Super League ==
=== Results summary ===
Overall								Home						Away					
Pld	W	D	L	GF	GA	GD	Pts	W	D	L	GF	GA	GD	W	D	L	GF	GA	GD
22	7	6	9	23	33	−10	27	3	4	4	14	15	−1	4	2	5	9	18	−9

Last updated: 8 May 2022.
Source: FA WSL

=== Results by matchday ===
Round	1	2	3	4	5	6	7	8	9	10	11	12	13	14	15	16	17	18	19	20	21	22
Ground	A	H	H	A	H	A	H	H	A	A	H	A	A	A	H	A	H	H	H	A	A	H
Result	L	D	W	W	D	L	D	W	D	D	W	L	W	L	L	W	D	L	L	W	L	L
Position	10	8	7	5	6	6	7	5	7	8	7	7	7	7	8	6	6	7	7	6	6	6

A = Away; H = Home; W = Win; D = Draw; L = Loss

=== Results ===
5 September 2021 1	Brighton & Hove Albion	2–0	West Ham United	Falmer
14:00	Kaagman 33' (pen.); Geum-min 41'; Symonds (yellow card) 57'	Report	Cissoko (red card) 32'; Longhurst (yellow card) 58'; Stringer (yellow card) 61'	Stadium: Falmer Stadium; Attendance: 2,264; Referee: Emily Heaslip

11 September 2021 2	West Ham United	1–1	Aston Villa	Dagenham
11:30	Leon 8'; Stringer (yellow card) 65'	Report	Littlejohn (yellow card) 66'; Allen 90+2'	Stadium: Victoria Road; Attendance: 1,106; Referee: Kirsty Dowle

26 September 2021 3	West Ham United	4–0	Leicester City	Dagenham
15:00	Yallop 26'; Walker 38'; Plumptre 45+1' (o.g.); Levell 81' (o.g.)	Report		Stadium: Victoria Road; Attendance: 1,128; Referee: Emily Heaslip

3 October 2021 4	Manchester City	0–2	West Ham United	Manchester
14:00		Report	Brynjarsdóttir 39'; Cissoko (yellow card) 90+2'; Hasegawa 90+4'	Stadium: Academy Stadium; Attendance: 1,298; Referee: Helen Conley

10 October 2021 5	West Ham United	1–1	Birmingham City	Dagenham
15:00	Walker (yellow card) 7', (goal) 54'; Stringer (yellow card) 86'	Report	Lo. Quinn 67'	Stadium: Victoria Road; Attendance: 1,142; Referee: Amy Fearn

7 November 2021 6	Arsenal	4–0	West Ham United	Borehamwood
18:45	Little 39', 52'; Mead 61'; Fisk 84' (o.g.); McCabe (yellow card) 90+2'	Report	Cissoko (yellow card) 14'	Stadium: Meadow Park; Attendance: 1,736; Referee: Kirsty Dowle

14 November 2021 7	West Ham United	2–2	Reading	Dagenham
15:00	Evans 19'; Fisk 35'; Walker (yellow card) 59'	Report	Harding (yellow card) 32'; Chaplen (yellow card) 58'; Bryson (yellow card) 68'; Stringer 70' (o.g.); Harries 90+2'	Stadium: Victoria Road; Attendance: 1,496; Referee: Emily Heaslip

21 November 2021 8	West Ham United	1–0	Tottenham Hotspur	Dagenham
15:00	Brynjarsdóttir 69'; Longhurst (yellow card) 88'	Report	Graham (yellow card) 16'; Simon (yellow card) 71'; Percival (yellow card) 76'; Ayane (yellow card) 81'	Stadium: Victoria Road; Attendance: 1,242; Referee: Lisa Benn

12 December 2021 9	Everton	1–1	West Ham United	Liverpool
13:00	Duggan 76'; George (yellow card) 78'; Sevecke (yellow card) 90'	Report	Svitková (yellow card) 31'; Wyne 40'	Stadium: Walton Hall Park; Attendance: 432; Referee: Lucy May

19 December 2021	Chelsea	P–P	West Ham United	Kingston upon Thames
12:15				Stadium: Kingsmeadow
Note: Postponed due to a COVID-19 outbreak at Chelsea

9 January 2022	West Ham United	P–P	Manchester United	Dagenham
18:45				Stadium: Victoria Road
Note: Postponed due to a COVID-19 outbreak at West Ham

16 January 2022 10	Tottenham Hotspur	1–1	West Ham United	Canons Park
18:45	Clemaron (yellow card) 45+4'; Ayane 54' (pen.); Zadorsky (yellow card) 74'	Report	Stringer (yellow card) 18'; Cissoko (yellow card) 30' (yellow-red card) 56'; Snerle (yellow card) 57'; Longhurst 90+2'	Stadium: The Hive; Attendance: 678; Referee: Amy Fearn

23 January 2022 11	West Ham United	3–0	Everton	Dagenham
15:00	Svitková 41'; Brynjarsdóttir 57'; Walker 86'	Report		Stadium: Victoria Road; Attendance: 1,372; Referee: Lauren Impey

26 January 2022 12	Chelsea	2–0	West Ham United	Kingston upon Thames
19:00	England 51'; Cuthbert 82'	Report	Parker (yellow card) 17'; Cissoko (yellow card) 20'	Stadium: Kingsmeadow; Attendance: 2,554; Referee: Ryan Atkin
Note: Rescheduled from 19 December 2021

6 February 2022 13	Aston Villa	1–2	West Ham United	Walsall
18:00	Lehmann 42' (pen.)	Report	Stringer 12', (yellow card) 36'; Walker (yellow card) 40'; Svitková 52'; Longhurst (yellow card) 60'	Stadium: Bescot Stadium; Attendance: 334; Referee: Lucy May

13 February 2022 14	Leicester City	3–0	West Ham United	Burton upon Trent
14:00	Flint 2', (yellow card) 76'; Plumptre 9'; Gregory 50'; Devlin (yellow card) 81'; O'Brien (yellow card) 90+3'	Report		Stadium: Pirelli Stadium; Attendance: 551; Referee: Abigail Byrne

10 March 2022 15	West Ham United	1–4	Chelsea	Dagenham
19:45	Brynjarsdóttir 48'	Report	Harder 21', 32'; Charles 24'; Kerr 63'	Stadium: Victoria Road; Attendance: 1,735; Referee: Carl Brook
Note: Rescheduled from 6 March due to Chelsea's involvement in the 2022 FA Women's League Cup Final.

13 March 2022 16	Birmingham City	0–1	West Ham United	Birmingham
14:00		Report	Leon 41'; Stringer (yellow card) 45+10'; Yallop (yellow card) 88'; Longhurst (yellow card) 90+2'	Stadium: St Andrew's; Attendance: 587; Referee: Louise Saunders

16 March 2022 17	West Ham United	1–1	Manchester United	Dagenham
19:30	Fisk (yellow card) 45+2', (goal) 90+3'	Report	Caldwell (yellow card) 7'; Toone 54', (yellow card) 89'	Stadium: Victoria Road; Attendance: 1,425; Referee: Neil Hair
Note: Rescheduled from 9 January 2022

27 March 2022 18	West Ham United	0–2	Brighton & Hove Albion	Dagenham
15:00		Report	Whelan 3'; Kaagman 81'	Stadium: Victoria Road; Attendance: 1,411; Referee: Paul Howard

2 April 2022 19	West Ham United	0–2	Manchester City	Dagenham
11:30		Report	Stanway 8'; Shaw 63'	Stadium: Victoria Road; Attendance: 1,475; Referee: Elizabeth Simms

24 April 2022 20	Reading	1–2	West Ham United	Reading
14:00	Harding (yellow card) 12'; Bryson (yellow card) 41', (goal) 90+5'	Report	Snerle 46'; Hasegawa 86'	Stadium: Madejski Stadium; Attendance: 600; Referee: Tom Reeves

1 May 2022 21	Manchester United	3–0	West Ham United	Leigh
12:00	Thomas 12'; Fisk 20' (o.g.); Galton 49'; Batlle (yellow card) 75'	Report		Stadium: Leigh Sports Village; Attendance: 2,546; Referee: Lucy May

8 May 2022 22	West Ham United	0–2	Arsenal	Dagenham
12:00	Brynjarsdottir (yellow card) 54'	Report	Maritz (yellow card) 6'; Blackstenius 60'; Catley 66'	Stadium: Victoria Road; Attendance: 2,585; Referee: Emily Heaslip

=== League table ===
Pos	Team	Pld	W	D	L	GF	GA	GD	Pts
4	Manchester United	22	12	6	4	45	22	+23	42
5	Tottenham Hotspur	22	9	5	8	24	23	+1	32
6	West Ham United	22	7	6	9	23	33	−10	27
7	Brighton & Hove Albion	22	8	2	12	24	38	−14	26
8	Reading	22	7	4	11	21	40	−19	25

Source: FA WSL
Rules for classification: 1) Points; 2) Goal difference; 3) Number of goals scored.

== Women's FA Cup ==
As a member of the first tier, West Ham entered the FA Cup in the fourth round proper.

30 January 2022 Fourth round	Sheffield United	1–4	West Ham United	Sheffield
13:00	Rayner 6'	Report	Filis 4'; Walker 21', 57'; Brynjarsdóttir 63'	Stadium: Bramall Lane

27 February 2022 Fifth round	Reading	0–1 (a.e.t.)	West Ham United	Reading
14:00	Eikeland (yellow card) 65'; Bryson (yellow card) 87'	Report	Arnold (yellow card) 42'; Fisk (yellow card) 49'; Brynjarsdóttir 105+1'; Walker (yellow card) 117'; Joel (yellow card) 118'	Stadium: Madejski Stadium

20 March 2022 Quarter-final	Ipswich Town	0–1	West Ham United	Felixstowe
12:30		Report	Evans 32'	Stadium: Goldstar Ground; Referee: Amy Fearn

16 April 2022 Semi-final	West Ham United	1–4	Manchester City	Dagenham
12:15	Evans 42'	Report	White 22'; Kelly 37', (yellow card) 53'; Hemp 66', 90+1'	Stadium: Victoria Road; Attendance: 1,565; Referee: Abigail Byrne

== FA Women's League Cup ==
=== Group stage ===
13 October 2021 Group stage	London City Lionesses	0–1	West Ham United	Dartford
19:00	Primus (yellow card) 65'	Report	Parker 15', (yellow card) 37'; Cissoko (yellow card) 90+2'	Stadium: Princes Park

17 November 2021 Group stage	Birmingham City	0–4	West Ham United	Birmingham
19:30	Pennock (yellow card) 45+2'; Holloway (yellow card) 64'; Scott (yellow card) 81'	Report	Lo. Quinn 38' (o.g.); Walker 41', (yellow card) 58'; Parker 74'; Svitková 78'	Stadium: St Andrew's

15 December 2021 Group stage	West Ham United	3–0	Brighton & Hove Albion	Dagenham
19:30	Longhurst 26'; Filis 40'; Svitková 90+4'	Report	Symonds (yellow card) 14'	Stadium: Victoria Road

Pos	Team	Pld	W	WPEN	LPEN	L	GF	GA	GD	Pts	Qualification	WHU	LCL	BHA	BIR
1	West Ham United	3	3	0	0	0	8	0	+8	9	Advances to knock-out stage	—	—	3–0	—
2	London City Lionesses	3	1	1	0	1	3	3	0	5	Possible knock-out stage based on ranking	0–1	—	—	2–2
3	Brighton & Hove Albion	3	1	0	0	2	1	4	−3	3		—	0–1	—	—
4	Birmingham City	3	0	0	1	2	2	7	−5	1		0–4	—	0–1	—

Source: thefa.com
Rules for classification: 1) Points; 2) Goal difference; 3) Number of goals scored; 4) Number of wins; 5) Head-to-head record

=== Knockout stage ===
19 January 2022 Quarter-final	West Ham United	2–4	Chelsea	Dagenham
19:30	Svitková 34'; Houssein 83'	Report	Harder 25', 61', 66', (yellow card) 82'; Cuthbert 58'	Stadium: Victoria Road; Attendance: 615; Referee: Paul Howard

== Squad statistics ==
=== Appearances ===
As of 8 May 2022

Starting appearances are listed first, followed by substitute appearances after the + symbol where applicable.

No.	Pos	Nat	Player	Total		FA WSL		FA Cup		League Cup	
No.	Pos	Nat	Player	Apps	Goals	Apps	Goals	Apps	Goals	Apps	Goals
1	GK	(Australia) AUS	Mackenzie Arnold	21	0	18	0	3	0	0	0
2	MF	(United States) USA	Zaneta Wyne	25	1	13+5	1	1+2	0	3+1	0
4	MF	(England) ENG	Abbey-Leigh Stringer	25	1	13+5	1	3	0	3+1	0
5	DF	(England) ENG	Gilly Flaherty	26	0	19	0	3+1	0	3	0
7	MF	(Scotland) SCO	Lisa Evans	22	3	12+4	1	3+1	2	0+2	0
8	MF	(Denmark) DEN	Emma Snerle	12	1	5+3	1	2+1	0	0+1	0
9	FW	(England) ENG	Claudia Walker	27	6	16+4	3	2+2	2	3	1
10	MF	(Czech Republic) CZE	Kateřina Svitková	26	5	17+2	2	3	0	2+2	3
12	MF	(England) ENG	Kate Longhurst	29	2	20+2	1	2+2	0	2+1	1
13	MF	(Australia) AUS	Tameka Yallop	22	1	13+3	1	2+1	0	3	0
14	MF	(Japan) JPN	Yui Hasegawa	23	2	16+1	2	2+1	0	3	0
15	DF	(England) ENG	Lucy Parker	22	2	8+6	0	4	0	4	2
17	MF	(England) ENG	Melisa Filis	25	2	4+15	0	2	1	4	1
18	GK	(New Zealand) NZL	Anna Leat	9	0	4	0	1	0	4	0
19	FW	(Canada) CAN	Adriana Leon	16	2	11+2	2	1+1	0	0+1	0
20	DF	(England) ENG	Lois Joel	17	0	0+10	0	2+1	0	3+1	0
22	DF	(England) ENG	Grace Fisk	23	2	15+1	2	4	0	3	0
23	DF	(France) FRA	Hawa Cissoko	23	0	19	0	1	0	2+1	0
24	MF	(England) ENG	Brooke Cairns	3	0	0+1	0	0+1	0	0+1	0
25	MF	(England) ENG	Grace Garrad	4	0	0+2	0	0	0	0+2	0
26	GK	(Canada) CAN	Emily Moore	0	0	0	0	0	0	0	0
27	DF	(England) ENG	Maisy Barker	0	0	0	0	0	0	0	0
32	MF	(Iceland) ISL	Dagný Brynjarsdóttir	27	6	19+1	4	1+3	2	2+1	0
33	MF	(England) ENG	Halle Houssein	8	1	0+5	0	2	0	0+1	1

== Transfers ==
=== Transfers in ===
Date	Position	Nationality	Name	From	Ref.
10 May 2021	MF	(Australia)	Tameka Yallop	(Australia) Brisbane Roar	
28 June 2021	MF	(United States)	Zaneta Wyne	(Scotland) Glasgow City	
1 July 2021	FW	(England)	Claudia Walker	(England) Birmingham City	
2 July 2021	MF	(England)	Melisa Filis	(England) London Bees	
27 July 2021	MF	(England)	Abbey-Leigh Stringer	(England) Everton	
3 August 2021	DF	(England)	Lucy Parker	(United States) UCLA Bruins	
6 August 2021	GK	(New Zealand)	Anna Leat	(United States) Georgetown Hoyas	
18 August 2021	MF	(Japan)	Yui Hasegawa	(Italy) Milan	
19 August 2021	MF	(England)	Brooke Cairns	(England) Everton	
19 August 2021	MF	(England)	Grace Garrad	(England) Arsenal	
6 January 2022	MF	(Denmark)	Emma Snerle	(Denmark) Fortuna Hjørring	
11 January 2022	MF	(England)	Halle Houssein (Note: Dual registration)	(England) Arsenal	
16 January 2022	GK	(Canada)	Emily Moore	(Canada) UBC Thunderbirds	

=== Loans in ===
Date	Position	Nationality	Name	From	Until	Ref.
13 August 2021	MF	(Scotland)	Lisa Evans	(England) Arsenal	End of season	

=== Transfers out ===
Date	Position	Nationality	Name	To	Ref.
21 May 2021	GK	(Republic of Ireland)	Courtney Brosnan	(England) Everton	
21 May 2021	MF	(France)	Kenza Dali	(England) Everton	
21 May 2021	MF	(Australia)	Emily van Egmond	(United States) Orlando Pride	
21 May 2021	FW	(Republic of Ireland)	Leanne Kiernan	(England) Liverpool	
21 May 2021	DF	(Norway)	Cecilie Redisch	(Norway) Sandviken	
21 May 2021	FW	(Scotland)	Martha Thomas	(England) Manchester United	
21 May 2021	DF	(Germany)	Laura Vetterlein	(Switzerland) FC Zürich	
30 June 2021	FW	(Switzerland)	Alisha Lehmann	(England) Aston Villa	
2 July 2021	MF	(South Korea)	Cho So-Hyun	(England) Tottenham Hotspur	
16 August 2021	DF	(England)	Maz Pacheco	(England) Aston Villa	
3 September 2021	FW	(Sweden)	Nor Mustafa	(France) Le Havre	
