= 2020–21 West Ham United F.C. Women season =

West Ham United
2020–21 season
- Chairman: Jack Sullivan
- Head Coach: Matt Beard (until 19 November); Billy Stewart (interim) (19 November – 23 December); Olli Harder (from 23 December)
- Stadium: Victoria Road, Dagenham
- FA WSL: 9th
- FA Cup: Fifth round
- League Cup: Semi-final
- Top goalscorer: League: Martha Thomas and Emily van Egmond (4); All: Emily van Egmond (11)
Home colours	Away colours	Third colours

The 2020–21 West Ham United F.C. Women season was the club's 30th season in existence and their third in the FA Women's Super League, the highest level of the football pyramid. Along with competing in the WSL, the club also contested two domestic cup competitions: the FA Cup and the League Cup.

On 29 July 2020, the club announced they had signed a one-year deal with Dagenham & Redbridge F.C. to play at Victoria Road for the season having previously played at the Rush Green training ground stadium.

Manager Matt Beard departed the club by mutual consent on 19 November 2020 with the club sat in 9th place in the league. He had been in charge since the team joined the WSL in June 2018. Billy Stewart assumed the role on an interim basis until Olli Harder, having most recently been assistant manager at Norwegian men's second tier side Sandnes Ulf, was appointed on 23 December 2020.

== Squad ==
As of 24 April 2021.

Note: Flags indicate national team as defined under FIFA eligibility rules; some limited exceptions apply. Players may hold more than one non-FIFA nationality.

No.	Pos.	Nation	Player
1	GK	(Australia) AUS	Mackenzie Arnold
2	DF	(Norway) NOR	Cecilie Redisch
3	DF	(England) ENG	Maz Pacheco
5	DF	(England) ENG	Gilly Flaherty (captain)
8	FW	(Republic of Ireland) IRL	Leanne Kiernan
9	FW	(Scotland) SCO	Martha Thomas
10	MF	(Czech Republic) CZE	Kateřina Svitková
11	FW	(Sweden) SWE	Nor Mustafa
12	MF	(England) ENG	Kate Longhurst
18	GK	(Republic of Ireland) IRL	Courtney Brosnan
19	FW	(Canada) CAN	Adriana Leon

No.	Pos.	Nation	Player
20	DF	(England) ENG	Lois Joel
21	MF	(France) FRA	Kenza Dali
22	DF	(England) ENG	Grace Fisk
23	DF	(France) FRA	Hawa Cissoko
25	MF	(Australia) AUS	Emily van Egmond
26	DF	(Germany) GER	Laura Vetterlein
27	DF	(England) ENG	Maisy Barker
32	MF	(Iceland) ISL	Dagný Brynjarsdóttir
41	DF	(England) ENG	Anouk Denton (on loan from Arsenal)
42	MF	(England) ENG	Janaye Beaufort

== FA Women's Super League ==
=== Results summary ===
Overall								Home						Away					
Pld	W	D	L	GF	GA	GD	Pts	W	D	L	GF	GA	GD	W	D	L	GF	GA	GD
22	3	6	13	21	39	−18	15	0	4	7	6	22	−16	3	2	6	15	17	−2

Last updated: 9 May 2021.
Source: FA WSL

=== Results by matchday ===
Round	1	2	3	4	5	6	7	8	9	10	11	12	13	14	15	16	17	18	19	20	21	22
Ground	A	H	H	A	H	A	H	A	A	H	A	H	A	H	H	A	A	H	H	A	A	H
Result	D	L	L	L	L	W	L	L	W	L	L	D	L	L	D	L	W	D	D	L	D	L
Position	8	9	9	10	10	9	9	10	10	10	10	11	11	11	11	12	10	9	9	10	9	9

A = Away; H = Home; W = Win; D = Draw; L = Loss

=== Results ===
6 September 2020 1	Tottenham Hotspur	1–1	West Ham United	Canons Park
14:00	Fisk 53' (o.g.)	Report	Pacheco (yellow card) 45+1'; Leon 57'	Stadium: The Hive Stadium; Attendance: Behind-closed-doors; Referee: Kirsty Dowle

12 September 2020 2	West Ham United	1–9	Arsenal	Dagenham
17:20	Dali 27'; Daly (yellow card) 11'; Fisk (yellow card) 14'; Flaherty (yellow card) 17' (yellow-red card) 34'; Leon (yellow card) 45+2'	Report	Roord 23', 52', 56'; Miedema 34', 54'; Little 40'; Mead 42'; Williamson 72'; Foord 86'	Stadium: Victoria Road; Attendance: 734; Referee: Abigail Byrne
Note: Pilot event for the return of spectators

4 October 2020 3	West Ham United	0–1	Reading	Dagenham
14:00		Report	Bruton 26'; Bartrip (yellow card) 31'	Stadium: Victoria Road; Attendance: Behind-closed-doors; Referee: Robert Whitton

11 October 2020 4	Everton	3–1	West Ham United	Liverpool
13:00	Sørensen 8'; Finnigan (yellow card) 52'; Graham 71', 90+2'	Report	Dali 24'; Longhurst (yellow card) 90+4'	Stadium: Walton Hall Park; Attendance: Behind-closed-doors; Referee: Edward Duckworth

18 October 2020 5	West Ham United	2–4	Manchester United	Dagenham
12:30	van Egmond 39', (yellow card) 56'; Daly (yellow card) 74', (goal) 83'; Dali (yellow card) 87'	Report	Russo 20', 42'; Heath 23'; Press 87'	Stadium: Victoria Road; Attendance: Behind-closed-doors; Referee: Ryan Atkin

8 November 2020 6	Birmingham City	1–2	West Ham United	Solihull
14:00	Walker 9'; Murray (yellow card) 90'	Report	Vetterlein (yellow card) 31'; Walker 43' (o.g.); van Egmond 73'; Daly (yellow card) 90+3'	Stadium: Damson Park; Attendance: Behind-closed-doors; Referee: Richie Watkins

15 November 2020 7	West Ham United	0–1	Brighton & Hove Albion	Dagenham
12:30		Report	Green (yellow card) 44'; Jarrett 69'	Stadium: Victoria Road; Attendance: Behind-closed-doors; Referee: Abigail Byrne

6 December 2020 8	Chelsea	3–2	West Ham United	Kingston upon Thames
12:30	Kerr 15', 55', 68'	Report	Daly (yellow card) 33', (goal) 47'; Eriksson 88' (o.g.)	Stadium: Kingsmeadow; Referee: Rebecca Welch

13 December 2020 9	Bristol City	0–4	West Ham United	Bath
14:00	Mastrantonio (yellow card) 33'	Report	Purfield 11' (o.g.); van Egmond 58'; Daly 64'; Flaherty (yellow card) 67'; Thomas 86'	Stadium: Twerton Park; Referee: Elizabeth Simms

20 December 2020	West Ham United	P–P	Aston Villa	Dagenham
14:00				Stadium: Victoria Road
Note: Game postponed following positive COVID-19 tests at the West Ham training ground

10 January 2021	Manchester City	P–P	West Ham United	Manchester
14:00				Stadium: Academy Stadium
Note: Postponed due to COVID-19 outbreak at Manchester City

17 January 2021 10	West Ham United	0–1	Tottenham Hotspur	Dagenham
15:00	Longhurst (yellow card) 61'; Vetterlein (yellow card) 90'	Report	Quinn 35'; Dean (yellow card) 61'	Stadium: Victoria Road; Attendance: Behind-closed-doors; Referee: Lucy Oliver

24 January 2021	Arsenal	P–P	West Ham United	Borehamwood
12:00				Stadium: Meadow Park
Note: Postponed due to frozen pitch and extreme weather warnings

31 January 2021 11	Manchester City	4–0	West Ham United	Manchester
14:00	Weir 9'; Stanway 39'; White 64'; Lavelle 71'	Report		Stadium: Academy Stadium; Attendance: Behind-closed-doors; Referee: Elizabeth Simms
Note: Rescheduled from 10 January 2021 following COVID-19 outbreak at Manchester City

7 February 2021 12	West Ham United	1–1	Bristol City	Dagenham
15:00	Pacheco (yellow card) 17'; Svitková 49', (yellow card) 64'	Report	van Egmond 7' (o.g.); Purfield (yellow card) 45+2'	Stadium: Victoria Road; Attendance: Behind-closed-doors; Referee: Sarah Garrett

10 February 2021 13	Brighton & Hove Albion	1–0	West Ham United	Crawley
19:00	Whelan 31'; Koivisto (yellow card) 33'; Heroum (yellow card) 62'	Report	Svitková (yellow card) 45'; Leon (yellow card) 90+3'	Stadium: Broadfield Stadium; Attendance: Behind-closed-doors; Referee: Isaac Searle

7 March 2021 14	West Ham United	0–2	Chelsea	Dagenham
14:00		Report	Kerr 7'; England 47'	Stadium: Victoria Road; Attendance: Behind-closed-doors; Referee: Robert Whitton

17 March 2021 15	West Ham United	2–2	Birmingham City	Dagenham
19:30	Flaherty (yellow card) 14'; van Egmond 46'; Svitková 73'	Report	Murphy 9'; Whipp (yellow card) 28'; Mace 90+4'	Stadium: Victoria Road; Attendance: Behind-closed-doors; Referee: Stacey Pearson

27 March 2021 16	Manchester United	2–0	West Ham United	Manchester
11:30	James 49'; Press 55'; A. Turner (yellow card) 61'; Batlle (yellow card) 67'; Sigsworth (yellow card) 90+4'; Ladd (yellow card) 90+8'	Report	Vetterlein (yellow card) 65' (yellow-red card) 77'	Stadium: Old Trafford; Attendance: Behind-closed-doors; Referee: Lisa Benn

3 April 2021 17	Reading	0–5	West Ham United	Reading
14:00	Cooper (yellow card) 45'	Report	Dali 7'; Svitková 10'; Thomas 11', 29', 37'; Flaherty (yellow card) 72'; Longhurst (yellow card) 89'	Stadium: Madejski Stadium; Attendance: Behind-closed-doors; Referee: Kirsty Dowle

20 April 2021 18	West Ham United	0–0	Aston Villa	Dagenham
18:00	Vetterlein (yellow card) 23'; Cissoko (yellow card) 57'	Report	N'Dow (yellow card) 27'; Gregory (yellow card) 62'; Hutton (yellow card) 90+3'; Ale (yellow card) 90+5'	Stadium: Victoria Road; Attendance: Behind-closed-doors; Referee: Amy Fearn
Note: Rescheduled from 20 December 2020 following positive COVID-19 tests at the West Ham training ground

25 April 2021 19	West Ham United	0–0	Everton	Dagenham
15:00		Report	Sevecke (yellow card) 72'	Stadium: Victoria Road; Attendance: Behind-closed-doors; Referee: Helen Conley

28 April 2021 20	Arsenal	2–0	West Ham United	Borehamwood
19:30	Miedema 33'; Foord (yellow card) 51'; Little 78'	Report		Stadium: Meadow Park; Attendance: Behind-closed-doors; Referee: Emily Heaslip
Note: Rescheduled from 24 January 2021 due to frozen pitch and extreme weather warnings

2 May 2021 21	Aston Villa	0–0	West Ham United	Walsall
12:30	Iwabuchi (yellow card) 60'	Report		Stadium: Bescot Stadium; Attendance: Behind-closed-doors; Referee: Rebecca Welch

9 May 2021 22	West Ham United	0–1	Manchester City	Dagenham
14:30	Cissoko (yellow card) 83'	Report	White 75'	Stadium: Victoria Road; Attendance: Behind-closed-doors; Referee: Kirsty Dowle

=== League table ===
Pos	Team	Pld	W	D	L	GF	GA	GD	Pts
7	Reading	22	5	9	8	25	41	−16	24
8	Tottenham Hotspur	22	5	5	12	18	41	−23	20
9	West Ham United	22	3	6	13	21	39	−18	15
10	Aston Villa	22	3	6	13	15	47	−32	15
11	Birmingham City	22	3	6	13	15	44	−29	14 (Note: On 7 May 2021, Birmingham City were deducted one point for fielding an ineligible player in a draw against Reading on 25 April 2021.)

Source: FA WSL
Rules for classification: 1) Points; 2) Goal difference; 3) Number of goals scored.

== Women's FA Cup ==
As a member of the top two tiers, West Ham will enter the FA Cup in the fourth round proper. Originally scheduled to take place on 31 January 2021, it was delayed due to COVID-19 restrictions.

18 April 2021 Fourth round	West Ham United	11–0	Chichester & Selsey	Dagenham
14:00	van Egmond 2' (pen.), 6', 20', 23'; Dali 10'; Flaherty 28'; Svitková 45'; Mustafa 59'; Redisch 71'; Longhurst 82' (pen.); Denton 84'	Report		Stadium: Victoria Road; Attendance: Behind-closed-doors; Referee: Sarah Garrett

16 May 2021 Fifth round	Manchester City	5–1	West Ham United	Manchester
14:00	White 15'; Beckie 39'; Lavelle 74'; Mewis 90+2'; Hemp 90+4'	Report	Denton 17'	Stadium: Academy Stadium; Attendance: Behind-closed-doors

== FA Women's League Cup ==
=== Group stage ===
7 October 2020 Group stage	Brighton & Hove Albion	2–2 (2–4 p)	West Ham United	Crawley
19:30	Le Tissier (yellow card) 12'; Connolly 42'; Kerkdijk (yellow card) 48'; Jarrett 61'	Report	Daly 31'; Flaherty 82'	Stadium: Broadfield Stadium; Attendance: Behind-closed-doors; Referee: Steven Hughes
	Penalties
	Jarrett (penalty missed); Heroum (penalty scored); Williams (penalty scored); Bowman (penalty missed)		(penalty scored) van Egmond; (penalty scored) Grant; (penalty missed) Daly; (penalty scored) Pacheco; (penalty scored) Lehmann

4 November 2020 Group stage	West Ham United	3–0	Reading	Dagenham
19:30	Lehmann 14', (yellow card) 45'; Flaherty (yellow card) 29'; van Egmond 51'; Daly 58'	Report		Stadium: Victoria Road; Attendance: Behind-closed-doors; Referee: Aji Ajibola

18 November 2020 Group stage	Charlton Athletic	0–4	West Ham United	Crayford
19:45	Newborough (red card) 63'; Laudat (yellow card) 89'	Report	van Egmond 3'; Kiernan 45', 50', (yellow card) 57'; Thomas 64'	Stadium: The Oakwood; Attendance: Behind-closed-doors; Referee: Luke Donaldson

Pos	Team	Pld	W	WPEN	LPEN	L	GF	GA	GD	Pts	Qualification	WHU	REA	BHA	CHA
1	West Ham United	3	2	1	0	0	9	2	+7	8	Advanced to knock-out stage	—	3–0	—	—
2	Reading	3	2	0	0	1	6	3	+3	6	Possible knock-out stage based on ranking	—	—	—	4–0
3	Brighton & Hove Albion	2	0	0	1	1	2	4	−2	1		2–2	0–2	—	—
4	Charlton Athletic	2	0	0	0	2	0	8	−8	0		0–4	—	C–C (Note: Match originally postponed following positive COVID-19 test by Brighton staff. An independent tribunal determined the fixture would not be rescheduled as it would have no effect on qualifying.)	—

Source: thefa.com
Rules for classification: 1) Points; 2) Goal difference; 3) Number of goals scored; 4) Number of wins; 5) Head-to-head record

=== Knockout stage ===
21 January 2021 Quarter-final	West Ham United	3–0	Durham	Dagenham
17:30	van Egmond 40'; Svitková 43'; Cissoko 84'; Mustafa (yellow card) 90'	Report		Stadium: Victoria Road; Attendance: Behind-closed-doors; Referee: Steven Hughes

3 February 2021 Semi-final	Chelsea	6–0	West Ham United	Kingston upon Thames
15:00	Harder 4', 27', 86'; Ingle 15'; England 27'; Kirby 69'	Report		Stadium: Kingsmeadow; Attendance: Behind-closed-doors; Referee: Stacey Pearson

== Squad statistics ==
=== Appearances ===
As of 16 May 2021

Starting appearances are listed first, followed by substitute appearances after the + symbol where applicable.

No.	Pos	Nat	Player	Total		FA WSL		FA Cup		League Cup	
No.	Pos	Nat	Player	Apps	Goals	Apps	Goals	Apps	Goals	Apps	Goals
1	GK	(Australia) AUS	Mackenzie Arnold	21	0	16	0	1+1	0	3	0
2	DF	(Norway) NOR	Cecilie Redisch	24	1	17+2	0	0+1	1	4	0
3	DF	(England) ENG	Maz Pacheco	22	0	11+6	0	2	0	3	0
5	DF	(England) ENG	Gilly Flaherty	28	2	21	0	2	1	5	1
8	FW	(Republic of Ireland) IRL	Leanne Kiernan	11	2	2+5	0	0+1	0	2+1	2
9	FW	(Scotland) SCO	Martha Thomas	19	5	14+2	4	0	0	1+2	1
10	MF	(Czech Republic) CZE	Kateřina Svitková	19	5	13+2	3	1	1	3	1
11	FW	(Sweden) SWE	Nor Mustafa	15	1	0+9	0	0+2	1	1+3	0
12	MF	(England) ENG	Kate Longhurst	25	1	16+2	0	1+1	1	4+1	0
18	GK	(Republic of Ireland) IRL	Courtney Brosnan	8	0	6	0	0	0	2	0
19	FW	(Canada) CAN	Adriana Leon	17	1	11+2	1	0	0	3+1	0
20	DF	(England) ENG	Lois Joel	9	0	3+2	0	0	0	3+1	0
21	MF	(France) FRA	Kenza Dali	21	4	15+3	3	2	1	1	0
22	DF	(England) ENG	Grace Fisk	28	0	22	0	2	0	4	0
23	DF	(France) FRA	Hawa Cissoko	16	1	6+6	0	2	0	1+1	1
25	MF	(Australia) AUS	Emily van Egmond	28	11	19+2	4	2	4	5	3
26	DF	(Germany) GER	Laura Vetterlein	22	0	16+1	0	2	0	3	0
27	DF	(England) ENG	Maisy Barker	6	0	1+2	0	1+1	0	0+1	0
32	MF	(Iceland) ISL	Dagný Brynjarsdóttir	10	0	9	0	1	0	0	0
41	DF	(England) ENG	Anouk Denton	5	2	1+2	0	2	2	0	0
42	MF	(England) ENG	Janaye Beaufort	1	0	0	0	0+1	0	0	0
Players away from the club on loan:
7	FW	(Switzerland) SUI	Alisha Lehmann	11	1	5+4	0	0	0	1+1	1
14	MF	(South Korea) KOR	Cho So-hyun	11	0	8+1	0	0	0	2	0
24	MF	(Poland) POL	Wiktoria Kiszkis	1	0	0+1	0	0	0	0	0
Players who appeared for the club but left during the season:
16	GK	(England) ENG	Emily Ramsey	1	0	0	0	1	0	0	0
17	MF	(England) ENG	Ruby Grant	8	0	2+4	0	0	0	1+1	0
29	FW	(England) ENG	Rachel Daly	12	5	8+1	3	0	0	3	2

== Transfers ==
=== Transfers in ===
Date	Position	Nationality	Name	From	Ref.
9 July 2020	GK	(Australia)	Mackenzie Arnold	(Australia) Brisbane Roar	
10 July 2020	DF	(England)	Maz Pacheco	(England) Reading	
16 July 2020	MF	(Czech Republic)	Kateřina Svitková	(Czech Republic) Slavia Praha	
20 July 2020	DF	(France)	Hawa Cissoko	(France) ASJ Soyaux	
24 July 2020	FW	(Sweden)	Nor Mustafa	(Sweden) Eskilstuna United	
10 August 2020	DF	(England)	Mia Cruickshank	(England) Reading	
14 August 2020	MF	(England)	Ruby Grant	(England) Arsenal	
2 October 2020	DF	(England)	Lois Joel (Note: Signed on non-contract terms)	(United States) North Carolina Tar Heels	
8 January 2021	MF	(Australia)	Emily van Egmond	(United States) Orlando Pride	
28 January 2021	MF	(Iceland)	Dagný Brynjarsdóttir	(Iceland) Selfoss	

=== Loans in ===
Date	Position	Nationality	Name	From	Until	Ref.
28 August 2020	MF	(Australia)	Emily van Egmond	(United States) Orlando Pride	31 December 2020	
3 September 2020	FW	(England)	Rachel Daly	(United States) Houston Dash	31 December 2020	
7 March 2021	GK	(England)	Emily Ramsey	(England) Manchester United	24 April 2021	
17 March 2021	DF	(England)	Anouk Denton	(England) Arsenal	End of season	

=== Transfers out ===
Date	Position	Nationality	Name	To	Ref.
1 June 2020	DF	(Germany)	Katharina Baunach	Retired	
12 June 2020	GK	(England)	Anna Moorhouse	(France) Bordeaux	
12 June 2020	MF	(Netherlands)	Tessel Middag	(Italy) Fiorentina	
12 June 2020	FW	(Netherlands)	Esmee de Graaf	(England) Leicester City	
12 June 2020	DF	(England)	Vyan Sampson	(Italy) San Marino Academy	
12 June 2020	FW	(Republic of Ireland)	Ruesha Littlejohn	(England) Leicester City	
12 June 2020	DF	(England)	Olivia Smith (Note: Non-contract player)	(England) London Bees	
9 August 2020	MF	(Germany)	Julia Simic	(Italy) A.C. Milan	
28 August 2020	DF	(Sweden)	Filippa Wallen	(Cyprus) Apollon Limassol	
20 September 2020	FW	(Australia)	Jacynta Galabadaarachchi	(Italy) Napoli	
11 January 2021	MF	(England)	Ruby Grant	(United States) North Carolina Tar Heels	

=== Loans out ===
Date	Position	Nationality	Name	To	Until	Ref.
20 January 2021	MF	(Poland)	Wiktoria Kiszkis	(Poland) Śląsk Wrocław	End of season	
27 January 2021	FW	(Switzerland)	Alisha Lehmann	(England) Everton	End of season	
29 January 2021	MF	(South Korea)	Cho So-hyun	(England) Tottenham Hotspur	End of season	
1 February 2021	FW	(England)	Angie Dunbar-Bonnie	(England) Charlton Athletic	End of season	
1 February 2021	DF	(England)	Mia Cruickshank	(England) London Bees	End of season	
28 March 2021	FW	(Poland)	Wiktoria Fronc	(England) London City Lionesses	End of season	
