= Hawa Cissoko =

French footballer (born 1997)

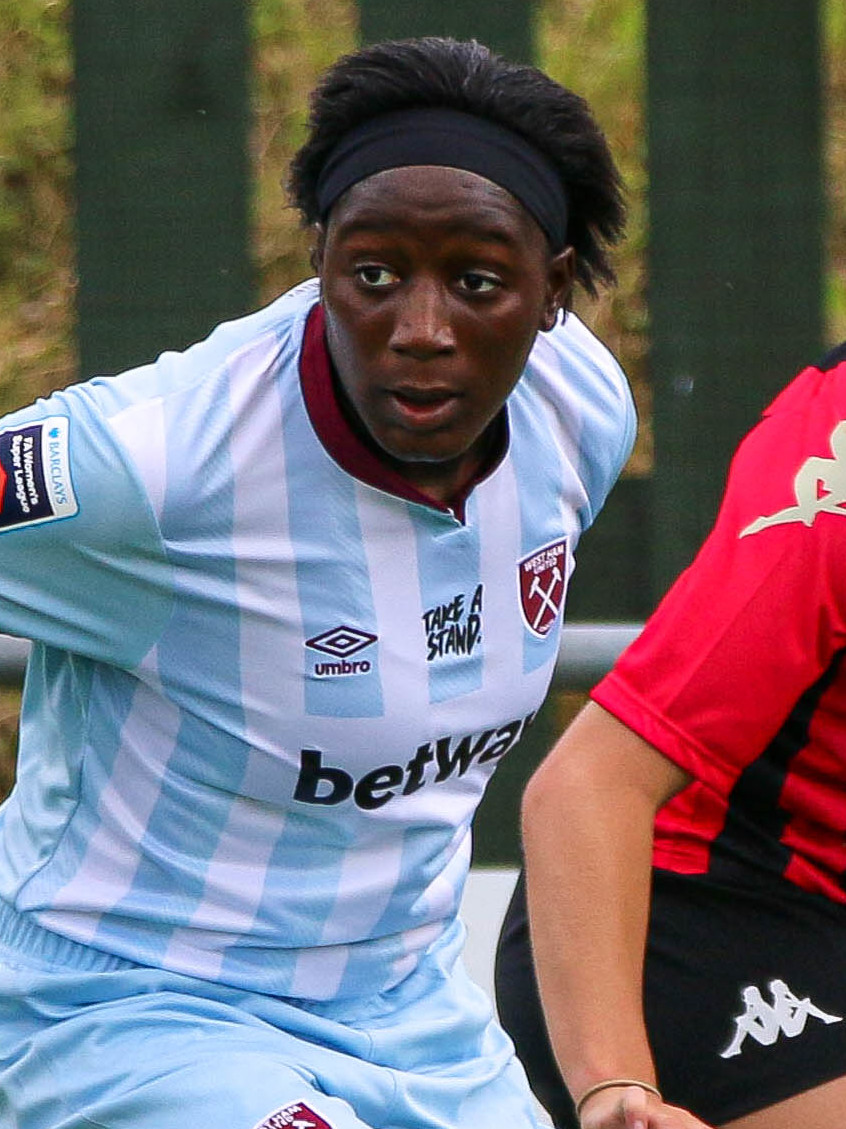
- Cissoko with West Ham United in 2021

Personal information
- Date of birth: 10 April 1997 (age 29)
- Place of birth: Paris, France
- Height: 1.74 m (5 ft 9 in)
- Position: Defender

Team information
- Current team: Charlton Athletic
- Number: 19

Youth career
- 2011–2012: Solitaires Paris Est
- 2012–2016: Paris Saint-Germain

Senior career*
Years	Team	Apps	(Gls)
2015–2017	Paris Saint-Germain	7	(0)
2017–2018	Marseille	11	(0)
2018–2020	Soyaux	37	(0)
2020–2024	West Ham United	67	(2)
2024–2025	AS Roma	7	(0)
2025–2026	Parma	10	(0)
2026–	Charlton Athletic	0	(0)

International career^{‡}
2015–2016	France U19	19	(0)
2016	France U20	7	(0)
2017–2019	France U23	8	(0)
2017–	France	9	(0)
- * Club domestic league appearances and goals as of 05:08, 5 September 2026 (UTC) ‡ National team caps and goals as of 23:00, 18 February 2023 (UTC)

Hawa Cissoko (born 10 April 1997) is a French professional footballer who plays as a defender for Women's Super League club Charlton Athletic and the France national team. She also holds Malian citizenship.

== Early life ==
Cissoko was born in Paris on 10 April 1997. She is one of 15 children. She began her football career as a 12 year old in when she joined FC Solitaire. She was then invited to joined Paris Saint-Germain youth team in 2012.

== Club career ==
Cissoko made her senior career debut for Paris Saint Germain during the 2014–15 season. She went on to join Olympique de Marseille in 2017. After a lone season with Marseille, she transferred to ASJ Soyaux in 2018.

She joined West Ham United in July 2020. On 15 October 2022, she was involved in an on-field scuffle in which she struck an opposing player in a league match against Aston Villa. She was subsequently banned for five matches as a result. On 11 December 2022, Cissoko scored her first senior career goal in a 2–0 league win against Tottenham Hotspur.

Cissoko scored the winning goal in the 2–1 home win against Arsenal in the 2023–24 season, coming from behind for West Ham's first ever victory over Arsenal in the Super League.

In July 2024, Cissoko left West Ham after 4 years and signed for AS Roma where she played for a year before joining fellow Serie A club Parma.

On 5 September 2026, Cissoko returned to the Women's Super League when she joined club Charlton Athletic on a one year contract.

== International career ==
Cissoko represented France at the 2016 FIFA U-20 World Cup. She has appeared twice for Les Bleues at senior level in 2017, both matches being friendly: on 18 September in a 1–1 draw against Spain and on 20 October 2017 in a 1–0 win against England.

By July 2020, after moving to England, Cissoko has expressed her desire to switch her international allegiance and play for Mali.

== Personal life ==
Cissoko is a Muslim. She made the decision in January 2021 to wear the hijab, only removing it during matches.

== Career statistics ==
=== Club ===
As of match played 17 December 2023

Appearances and goals by club, season and competition
Club	Season	League			National cup (Note: Includes Coupe de France, Women's FA Cup)		League cup (Note: Includes FA Women's League Cup)		Total	
Club	Season	Division	Apps	Goals	Apps	Goals	Apps	Goals	Apps	Goals
Paris Saint-Germain	2014–15	D1 Féminine	1	0	0	0	–		1	0
Paris Saint-Germain	2015–16	D1 Féminine	4	0	1	0	–		5	0
Paris Saint-Germain	2016–17	D1 Féminine	2	0	1	0	–		3	0
Paris Saint-Germain	Total		7	0	2	0	–		9	0
Marseille	2017–18	D1 Féminine	11	0	2	0	–		13	0
ASJ Soyaux	2018–19	D1 Féminine	21	0	2	0	–		23	0
ASJ Soyaux	2019–20	D1 Féminine	16	0	2	0	–		18	0
ASJ Soyaux	Total		37	0	4	0	–		41	0
West Ham United	2020–21	Women's Super League	12	0	2	0	2	0	16	0
West Ham United	2021–22	Women's Super League	19	0	1	0	3	0	23	0
West Ham United	2022–23	Women's Super League	16	1	2	0	3	0	21	1
West Ham United	2023–24	Women's Super League	10	0	0	0	2	1	12	1
West Ham United	Total		57	1	5	0	10	1	72	2
Career total			112	1	13	0	10	1	135	2

=== International ===
As of match played 18 February 2023

Appearances and goals by national team and year
National team	Year	Apps	Goals
France	2017	2	0
France	2021	2	0
France	2022	3	0
France	2023	2	0
Total		9	0
