= Emma Snerle =

Danish footballer (born 2001)

Personal information
- Full name: Emma Strøm Snerle
- Date of birth: 23 March 2001 (age 25)
- Place of birth: Dronninglund, Denmark
- Height: 1.67 m (5 ft 6 in)
- Position: Midfielder

Team information
- Current team: Fiorentina
- Number: 18

Senior career*
Years	Team	Apps	(Gls)
2017–2022	Fortuna Hjørring	89	(31)
2022–2024	West Ham United	41	(3)
2024–	Fiorentina	26	(1)

International career^{‡}
2016–2017	Denmark U-16	6	(2)
2017–2018	Denmark U-17	17	(5)
2019–	Denmark U-19	13	(3)
2019–	Denmark	36	(2)
- * Club domestic league appearances and goals as of 16:55, 1 August 2024 (UTC) ‡ National team caps and goals as of 16:55, 1 August 2024 (UTC)

Emma Strøm Snerle (born 23 March 2001) is a Danish professional footballer who plays as a midfielder for Italian Serie A club Fiorentina and the Denmark national team.

Snerle has played in Denmark, England and Italy, and was part of the Denmark squads at the 2023 FIFA Women's World Cup and the UEFA Women's Euro 2025.

== Career ==
Snerle made her league debut for Fortuna Hjørring against BSF when she was 16 years old. On 25 April 2019, she signed a two and a half year contract with the club. Snerle was named the 2019 Women's League Talent of the Year in February 2020.

On 6 January 2022, it was announced that Snerle had joined Women's Super League side West Ham United on a two-and-a-half-year deal. She scored her first goal for the club against Reading on 24 April 2022, scoring in the 46th minute. Snerle assisted the equalizer for Viviane Asseyi who made it 1–1 in the 85th minute against Manchester United on 3 March 2024. On 30 June 2024, it was announced that she would be leaving the club at the end of her contract.

On 26 July 2024, Snerle was announced at Fiorentina on a two-year contract. On 15 July 2026, she extended her contract with the club until 2028.

== International career ==
Snerle made her senior Denmark international debut against Finland on 21 January 2019. She scored her first international goal against Azerbaijan on 21 September 2021, scoring in the 78th minute.

Snerle has appeared for the team during the UEFA Euro 2021 qualifying cycle.

On 30 June 2023, Snerle was called up to the 23-player Danish squad for the 2023 FIFA Women's World Cup.

On 20 June 2025, Snerle was called up to the Danish squad for the UEFA Women's Euro 2025.

== Career statistics ==
=== Club ===
As of match played 17 December 2023

Appearances and goals by club, season and competition
Club	Season	League			National cup (Note: includes Danish Cup, Women's FA Cup)		League cup (Note: includes FA Women's League Cup)		Continental (Note: includes UEFA Women's Champions League)		Total	
Club	Season	Division	Apps	Goals	Apps	Goals	Apps	Goals	Apps	Goals	Apps	Goals
Fortuna Hjørring	2017–18	Elitedivisionen	6	0	0	0	—		0	0	6	0
Fortuna Hjørring	2018–19	Elitedivisionen	19	4	3	0	—		2	0	24	4
Fortuna Hjørring	2019–20	Elitedivisionen	17	6	3	0	—		4	0	24	6
Fortuna Hjørring	2020–21	Elitedivisionen	24	7	2	0	—		3	1	29	8
Fortuna Hjørring	2021–22	Elitedivisionen	14	13	0	0	—		0	0	14	13
Fortuna Hjørring	Total		80	30	8	0	—		9	1	97	31
West Ham United	2021–22	Women's Super League	8	1	3	0	1	0	—		12	1
West Ham United	2022–23	Women's Super League	12	2	2	0	2	0	—		16	2
West Ham United	2023–24	Women's Super League	1	0	0	0	0	0	—		1	0
West Ham United	Total		21	3	5	0	3	0	—		29	3
Career total			101	33	13	0	3	0	9	1	126	34

=== International ===
As of match played 24 October 2025

Appearances and goals by national team and year
National team	Year	Apps	Goals
Denmark	2019	6	0
Denmark	2020	7	0
Denmark	2021	9	2
Denmark	2022	2	0
Denmark	2023	6	0
Denmark	2024	8	0
Denmark	2025	9	1
Total		47	3

Scores and results list Denmark's goal tally first, score column indicates score after each Snerle goal.

List of international goals scored by Emma Snerle
No.	Date	Venue	Opponent	Score	Result	Competition	Ref.
1	21 September 2021	ASK Arena, Baku, Azerbaijan	Azerbaijan	8–0	8–0	2023 FIFA Women's World Cup qualification	
2	25 November 2021	Bosnia and Herzegovina FA Training Centre, Zenica, Bosnia and Herzegovina	Bosnia and Herzegovina	3–0	3–0	2023 FIFA Women's World Cup qualification	
3	24 October 2025	Tammelan Stadion, Tampere, Finland	Finland	1–0	6–1	2025 UEFA Women's Nations League promotion/relegation matches	

== Honours ==
Fortuna Hjørring

- A-Liga: 2017–18, 2019–20
- Danish Cup: 2018–19
