= Grace Fisk =

English footballer (born 1998)

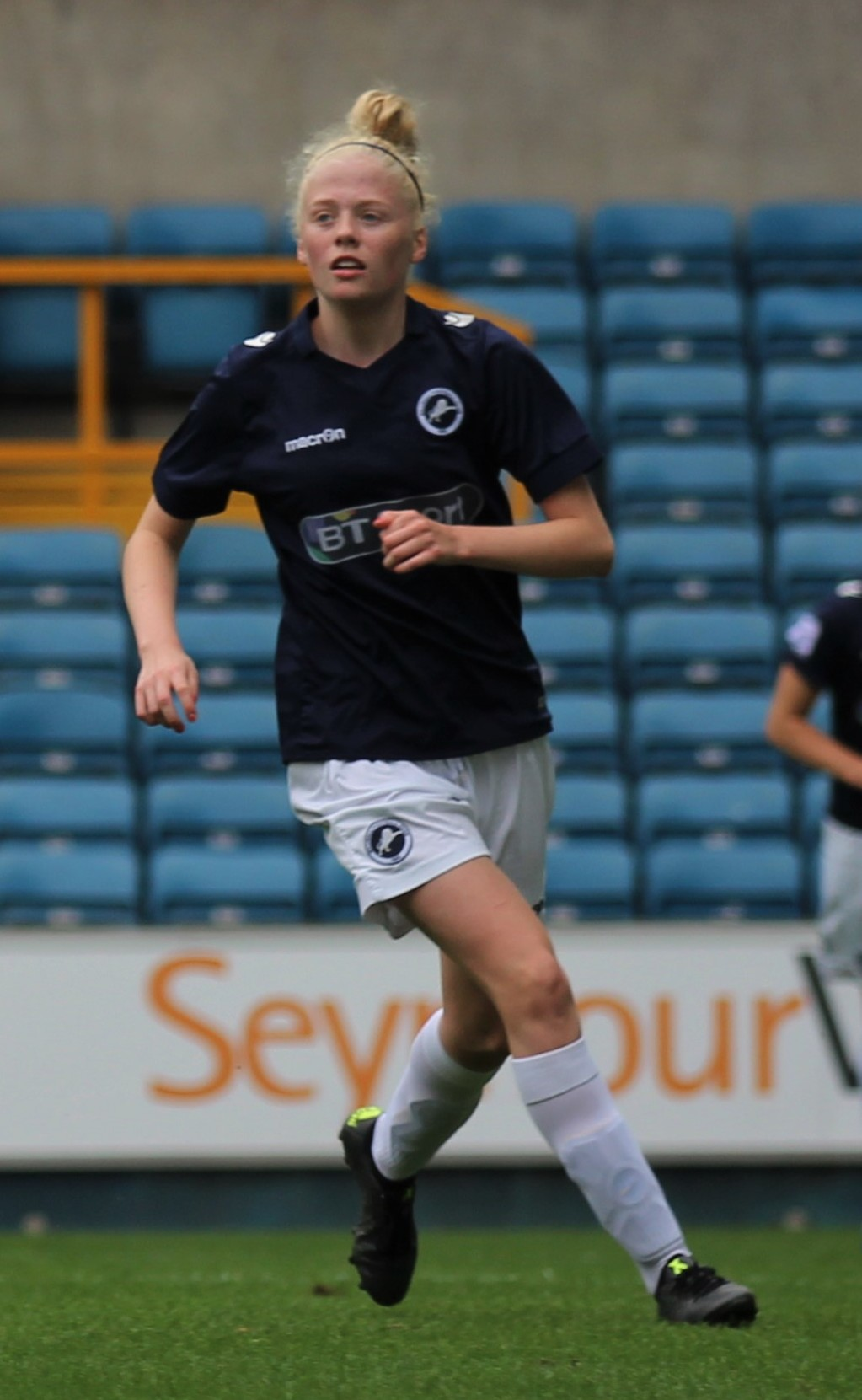
- Fisk playing for Millwall Lionesses in 2015

Personal information
- Full name: Grace Rebecca Fisk
- Date of birth: 5 January 1998 (age 28)
- Place of birth: Bromley, England
- Height: 1.72 m (5 ft 8 in)
- Position: Defender

Team information
- Current team: Liverpool
- Number: 4

Youth career
- 2008–2015: Millwall Lionesses

College career
Years	Team	Apps	(Gls)
2016	Penn State Nittany Lions	18	(1)
2017–2019	South Carolina Gamecocks	61	(5)

Senior career*
Years	Team	Apps	(Gls)
2014–2016	Millwall Lionesses	25	(2)
2020–2023	West Ham United	64	(2)
2023–	Liverpool	63	(4)

International career^{‡}
2014–2015	England U17	7	(2)
2016–2017	England U19	9	(0)
2017–2018	England U20	8	(0)
2019	England U21	6	(0)
2020–	England	2	(0)
Medal record
Women's football
Representing England
FIFA U-20 Women's World Cup
Third place	2018 France
- * Club domestic league appearances and goals as of 23:35, 9 October 2026 (UTC) ‡ National team caps and goals as of 23:55, 13 October 2026 (UTC)

Grace Rebecca Fisk (born 5 January 1998) is an English professional footballer who plays as a defender for Women's Super League club Liverpool, which she captains, and the England national team.

== College career ==
In 2016, Fisk moved to the United States to play collegiately for Penn State Nittany Lions of the Big Ten Conference and started 18 of Penn State's 21 matches as a freshman. For her sophomore year, Fisk transferred to SEC team South Carolina Gamecocks. In 2019, Fisk was an ever-present in a Gamecocks backline that achieved the second most shutouts in the country with 17 on the way to winning the SEC Championship with Fisk named as tournament MVP. She was named SEC Defensive Player of the Year in all three seasons at South Carolina.

== Club career ==
=== Millwall ===
Fisk joined Millwall Lionesses age 10, rising from the Centre of Excellence to the Development Squad. In 2014, she became the youngest player to debut for the Millwall Lionesses senior team when she did so at age 16, and was named the club's Young Player of the Year in 2015.

=== West Ham United ===
On 30 December 2019, Fisk returned to England to sign with FA WSL team West Ham United. She made her debut on 12 January 2020, starting in a 2–1 WSL defeat away to Tottenham Hotspur.

=== Liverpool ===
On 20 July 2023, Fisk signed for Liverpool, rejoining former West Ham manager Matt Beard. She made her Reds debut on 1 October 2023 in a 1–0 Women's Super League win over Arsenal F.C. at the Emirates Stadium.

On 3 September 2025, Fisk was named as Liverpool's new captain, replacing Niamh Fahey following her retirement at the end of the 2024–25 season.

== International career ==
=== Youth ===
Fisk has represented England at under-17, under-19, under-20 and under-21 level. Having scored twice against Bulgaria in qualifying, Fisk started all three games for England at the 2015 UEFA Women's Under-17 Championship as the team were knocked out at the group stage. Fisk also appeared in every game at the 2017 UEFA Women's Under-19 Championship where England finished in 5th place, beating Scotland in the U20 World Cup qualifying play-off. Fisk captained the England squad that won a bronze medal at the 2018 U20 World Cup in France, beating the host nation on penalties in the third place match.

=== Senior ===
In February 2020, Fisk received her first senior England call-up as part of the 2020 SheBelieves Cup squad. In October 2025, still uncapped for the senior team, she received her first call up in the Weigman era as a replacement for Katie Reid. On 1 December 2025, Fisk had to withdraw from the England squad, after picking up a small injury. In February 2026, she was again called up to the squad for 2027 FIFA Women's World Cup qualification matches.

Fisk made her senior England debut on 9 October 2026, coming on as a second-half stoppage time substitute in a 3–1 2027 FIFA Women's World Cup qualification play-off win against Greece at Pankritio Stadium. Following her debut, she was awarded legacy number 243 by the Women's Football Association.

== Career statistics ==
=== Club ===
As of match played 3 October 2026.

Appearances and goals by club, season and competition
Club	Season	League			FA Cup		League Cup		Total	
Club	Season	Division	Apps	Goals	Apps	Goals	Apps	Goals	Apps	Goals
Millwall Lionesses	2014	Women's Super League 2	5	0	0	0	0	0	5	0
Millwall Lionesses	2015	Women's Super League 2	13	1	1	0	4	0	18	1
Millwall Lionesses	2016	Women's Super League 2	7	1	1	0	1	0	9	1
Millwall Lionesses	Total		25	2	2	0	5	0	32	2
West Ham United	2019–20	Women's Super League	5	0	1	0	0	0	6	0
West Ham United	2020–21	Women's Super League	22	0	1	0	4	0	27	0
West Ham United	2021–22	Women's Super League	16	2	4	0	3	0	23	2
West Ham United	2022–23	Women's Super League	21	0	2	0	5	0	28	0
West Ham United	Total		64	2	8	0	12	0	84	2
Liverpool	2023–24	Women's Super League	22	1	0	4	0	29	1	
Liverpool	2024–25	Women's Super League	17	0	3	1	2	0	22	1
Liverpool	2025–26	Women's Super League	19	1	2	0	2	0	23	1
Liverpool	2026–27	Women's Super League	5	2	0	0	0	0	5	2
Liverpool	Total		63	4	8	1	8	0	79	5
Career total			152	8	18	1	25	0	195	9

=== International ===
As of match played 13 October 2026

Appearances and goals by national team and year
National team	Year	Apps	Goals
England	2026	2	0
Total		2	0

== Honours ==
South Carolina Gamecocks

- SEC Women's Soccer Tournament: 2019

England U20

- FIFA U-20 Women's World Cup third place: 2018

Individual

- SEC Defensive Player of the Year: 2017, 2018, 2019
