= Thea Kyvåg =

Norwegian footballer (born 2004)

Personal information
- Date of birth: 9 January 2004 (age 22)
- Place of birth: Norway
- Position: Forward

Team information
- Current team: AC Milan
- Number: 7

Youth career
- Gjelleråsen

Senior career*
Years	Team	Apps	(Gls)
2019	Gjelleråsen	16	(26)
2020–2022	LSK Kvinner	40	(7)
2022–2023	West Ham	10	(0)
2023–2025	LSK Kvinner	66	(14)
2025–	AC Milan	22	(3)

International career^{‡}
2019	Norway U15	4	(2)
2020	Norway U16	3	(1)
2021–2023	Norway U19	28	(4)
2023–	Norway U23	8	(1)
- * Club domestic league appearances and goals as of 17 May 2026 ‡ National team caps and goals as of 7 April 2025

Thea Kyvåg (born 9 January 2004) is a Norwegian footballer who plays as a forward for Serie A club AC Milan and the Norway under-23 national team.

== Club career ==
Kyvåg started her career with Norwegian fourth tier side Gjelleråsen. Before the 2020 season, she signed for LSK in the Norwegian top flight. In 2022, Kyvåg signed for English club West Ham.

On 27 August 2025, Kyvåg signed a two-year contract with Serie A club AC Milan.

== International career ==
She became a prolific youth international, especially for Norway U19, taking part in the 2022 UEFA Women's Under-19 Championship.

== Personal life ==
She is the daughter of handball player Sahra Hausmann.

== Honours ==
Individual

- Serie A Team of the Season (Under-23): 2025–26
