= Alex Hennessy =

English footballer

Personal information
- Date of birth: 23 November 2004 (age 21)
- Place of birth: London, England
- Position: Midfielder

Youth career
- Arsenal

Senior career*
Years	Team	Apps	(Gls)
2021–2022	Arsenal	1	(0)
2022	→ Crystal Palace (loan)	9	(0)
2022–2023	West Ham United	0	(0)
2023	Charlton Athletic	8	(1)
2023	Billericay Town		

International career^{‡}
2019	England U15	2	(1)
2020	England U16	0	(0)
2021–	England U19	5	(3)
- * Club domestic league appearances and goals as of 13:25, 11 April 2023 (UTC) ‡ National team caps and goals as of 13:25, 11 April 2023 (UTC)

Alex Hennessy (born 23 November 2004) is an English professional footballer who plays as a midfielder.

== Early life and career ==
Hennessy began playing football on a boys' team due to the lack of local girls' team. She had initially become interested in the game after playing football in a resort whilst on holiday with her family, and as a result her mother started looking for a team for Hennessy to join. She cited England international midfielders Jordan Nobbs and Paul Scholes as her footballing heroes. From the age of 11, Hennessy attended the Coopers' Company and Coborn School, a comprehensive school in Havering, England.

== Club career ==
Coming through the Arsenal academy, Hennessy made her unofficial first-team debut on 1 August 2021 as a 60th-minute substitute against Chelsea in a preseason friendly. She started in a North London Derby friendly match against Tottenham Hotspur a week later and scored twice as Arsenal won 4–0.

Hennessy made her competitive debut on 12 September 2021 in a 4–0 FA Women's Super League win over Reading, playing the final 12 minutes. She was not selected for any subsequent match day squads up to the January transfer window, before joining FA Women's Championship club Crystal Palace on loan for the remainder of the season on 28 January 2022.

Hennessy made her debut for Crystal Palace on 30 January 2022, coming on as a substitute for the last 14 minutes in a 3–1 victory over Lewes. Her first start with Crystal Palace came against Coventry United on 6 March 2022, with the side losing 1–0. She made a total of nine appearances for Crystal Palace including three starts.

In January 2023, joined FA Women's Championship club Charlton Athletic.

== International ==
Hennessy has represented England at under-15, under-16, under-17 and under-19 level, and has captained her country as a youth international.
