= Kenza Dali =

French footballer (born 1991)

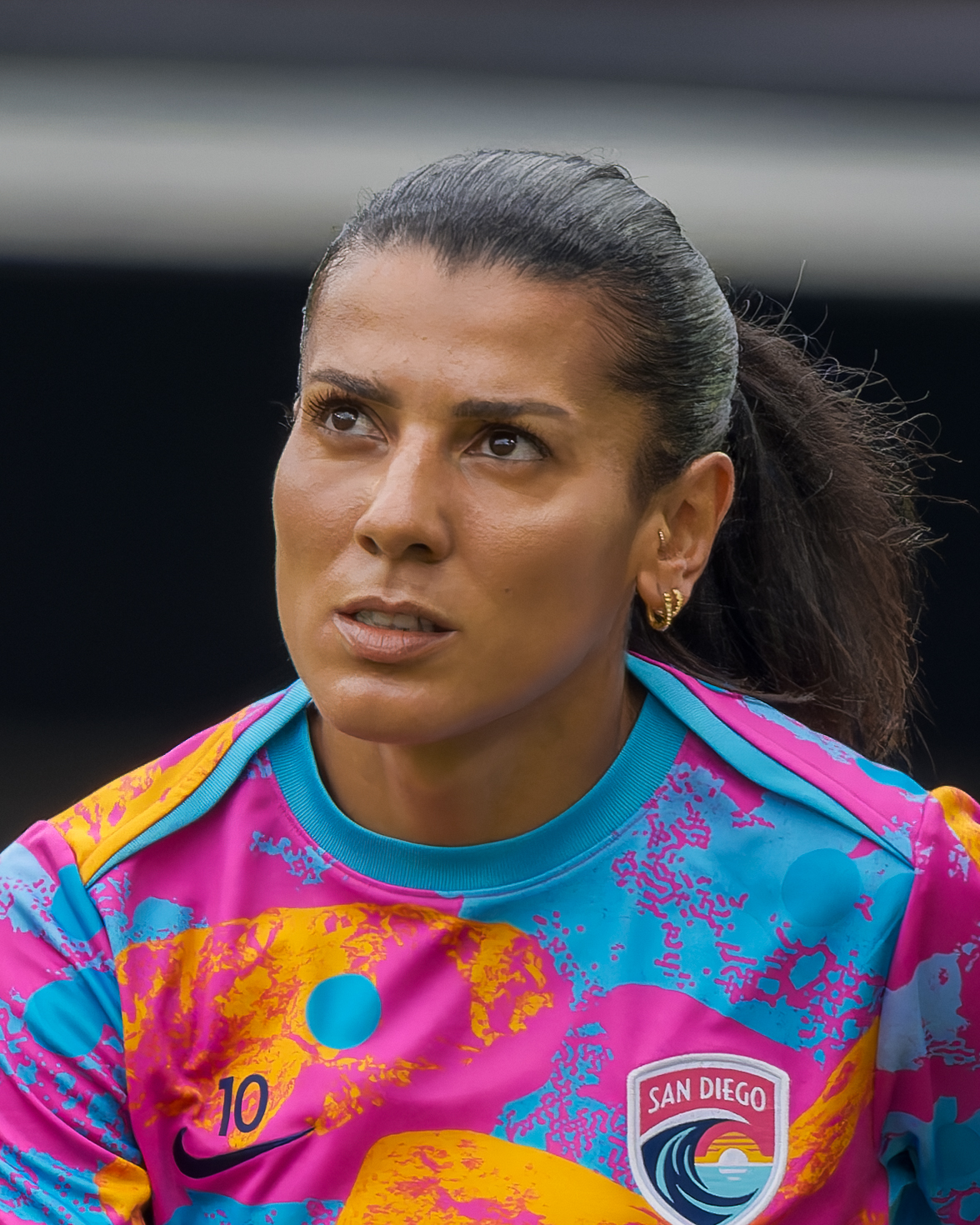
- Dali with the San Diego Wave in 2026

Personal information
- Full name: Kenza Dali
- Date of birth: 31 July 1991 (age 35)
- Place of birth: Sainte-Colombe, France
- Height: 1.65 m (5 ft 5 in)
- Position: Midfielder

Team information
- Current team: San Diego Wave
- Number: 10

Youth career
- 2005–2009: Lyon

Senior career*
Years	Team	Apps	(Gls)
2009–2010	Lyon	1	(0)
2010–2011	Rodez	22	(2)
2011–2016	Paris Saint-Germain	89	(36)
2016–2018	Lyon	2	(0)
2018	→ Lille (loan)	10	(1)
2018–2019	Dijon	17	(6)
2019–2021	West Ham United	32	(5)
2021–2022	Everton	20	(0)
2022–2025	Aston Villa	48	(7)
2025–	San Diego Wave	53	(6)

International career^{‡}
2007–2008	France U17	5	(3)
2009	France U19	7	(3)
2012	France U20	2	(0)
2014–2018	France U23	8	(4)
2014–	France	76	(13)
Medal record
Women's football
Representing France
UEFA Women's Nations League
Runner-up	2024
- * Club domestic league appearances and goals as of 16:40, 15 November 2026 (UTC) ‡ National team caps and goals as of 4 April 2025

Kenza Dali (born 31 July 1991) is a French professional footballer who plays as a midfielder for San Diego Wave FC of the National Women's Soccer League (NWSL) and the France national team.

== Early life ==
Dali was born in Sainte-Colombe, Rhône, and grew up in the suburbs of Lyon. She is of Algerian descent, with her father immigrating to France from Algeria at 18 years old. Dali lost her brother when she was 13 and subsequently saw her mother beat breast cancer. She has cited these moments as experiences which have strengthened her mentally. She started playing football at the age of 6 and joined Olympique Lyonnais at the age of 11.

== Club career ==
=== Early career ===
Dali spent the majority of her career with Lyon playing on the club's reserve team in D3 Féminine, the third level of women's football in France. She signed her first professional contract at age 16, but only played one match with Lyon's first team. Due to an interest in gaining more playing time, Dali ultimately departed from Lyon after three years with the club.

On 25 July 2010, Dali signed with Rodez. She made a total of 24 appearances with the club across all competitions in her quest to gain more experience. Following a successful stint at Rodez, Dali transferred to Paris Saint-Germain. She made 89 league appearances in 5 seasons with the club. Her final campaign with PSG was marred by a knee injury that kept Dali sidelined for the first half of the season.

=== Lyon ===
In the summer of 2016, Dali returned to her training club Olympique Lyon. She made her league debut against ASJ Soyaux-Charente on 11 September 2016. 9 days later, she injured her knee and subsequently underwent surgery and re-surgery. She was eventually able to return to full fitness, but found it difficult to secure a regular place in the Lyon squad. In a quest to find more playing time, Dali was loaned out to Lille on 17 January 2018. She did not end up returning to Lyon, instead joining Dijon after her loan expired. She debuted for Dijon against Montpellier HSC on 25 August 2018.

=== West Ham United ===
On 25 July 2019, Dali was announced by West Ham. She made her league debut against Arsenal on 8 September 2019. Dali scored her first league goal against Brighton on 13 October 2019, scoring a penalty in the 70th minute. On 21 May 2021, Dali was released by West Ham United.

=== Everton ===
On 1 July 2021, Dali signed a two-year contract with Everton. She made her league debut against Manchester City on 4 September 2021. Dali scored her first goal for Everton in the Women's FA Cup on 27 February 2022 against Charlton Athletic, scoring in the 34th minute. She made 27 appearances across all competitions for Everton before departing from the club in August 2022.

=== Aston Villa ===
After her stints with West Ham and Everton, Dali originally planned to depart from England. However, after a conversation with Carla Ward, she changed her mind and signed a contract with Aston Villa on 5 August 2022. She scored a goal in her club debut, helping Aston Villa beat Manchester City 4–3 at Villa Park in September 2022. Within her first seven months at Aston Villa, Dali racked up 6 goals and 10 assists across all competitions. On 2 June 2023, she signed a new contract until June 2025 with the option of a further year. On 7 February 2024, in the 2023–24 Conti Cup quarterfinal against Brighton, Dali assisted the goal to tie the game 1–1, and her team later advanced on penalties.

=== San Diego Wave ===
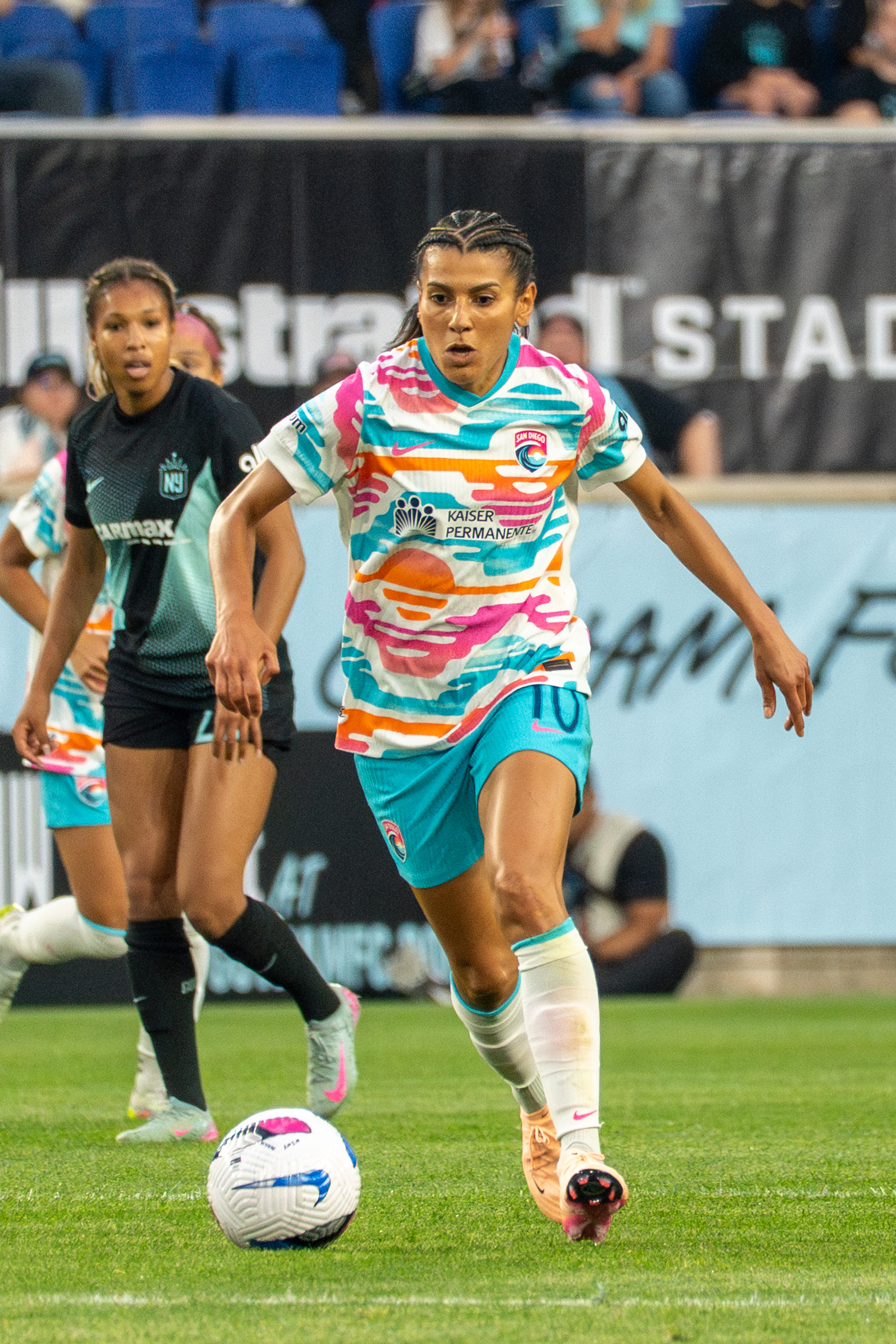
Dali with the San Diego Wave in 2025

Dali joined National Women's Soccer League club San Diego Wave FC on 24 January 2025, signing a two-year contract with the team. She made her NWSL debut in San Diego's season opener against Angel City FC, starting and playing 90 minutes. Two games later, Dali recorded her first Wave assist, serving up a cross to Chiamaka Okwuchukwu in a defeat to the Orlando Pride. She notched her first NWSL goal in a 4–1 victory over Racing Louisville FC on 19 April, scoring directly from a free kick. At the end of April 2025, she received her first NWSL Team of the Month accolade alongside French teammate Delphine Cascarino. Two months later, Dali repeated the feat, winning another Team of the Month award for her performances in June. On 18 October 2025, Dali scored in a 6–1 victory over Chicago Stars FC that clinched a playoff berth for the Wave and also set a club record for goals scored in a single match. She ended the season having been the only player on San Diego to start all 26 of the Wave's regular season matches; she also led the team in minutes as the Wave finished in sixth place overall. She started and played all 120 minutes of the Wave's quarterfinal extra-time defeat to the Portland Thorns on 9 November. At the end of the season, Dali was one of five players nominated for NWSL Midfielder of the Year, but the award was won by Manaka Matsukubo. Dali did, however, earn a spot on the NWSL Second XI, alongside French teammate Delphine Cascarino.

On 5 March 2026, the Wave announced that they had extended Dali's contract through the 2027 season; she had previously been signed for San Diego through 2026. After the first month of the 2026 season concluded, Dali received her second NWSL Team of the Month honor after leading the league in chances created throughout March.

== International career ==
Dali was called up to the France national team for the first time in her career in 2014. She played her first game in a 2015 FIFA World Cup qualification match against Hungary, being substituted into the game in the 76th minute. She scored her first goal for the senior national team in a friendly match against Brazil.

On 30 May 2022, Dali was called up to the France squad for the UEFA Women's Euro 2022.

Dali was included in the squad for the 2023 FIFA Women's World Cup. She scored one goal in the tournament, the second tally in a 4–0 Round of 16 victory over Morocco. One match later, she participated in France's quarterfinal penalty shootout against Australia. Opposing goalkeeper Mackenzie Arnold saved Dali's first spot-kick attempt, but Dali was given the chance to redo the kick after it had been discovered that Arnold had stepped off her line too early. However, Arnold saved the second shot as well, helping Australia win the shootout, 7–6.

Dali was included in the squad for the 2024 Summer Olympics.

== Career statistics ==
=== Club ===
As of 16 November 2025

Appearances and goals by club, season and competition
Club	Season	League			National Cup		League Cup		Continental		Total	
Club	Season	Division	Apps	Goals	Apps	Goals	Apps	Goals	Apps	Goals	Apps	Goals
Lyon	2009–10	Division 1 Féminine	1	0	—		—		0	0	1	0
Rodez	2010–11	Division 1 Féminine	22	2	2	1	—		0	0	24	3
Paris Saint-Germain	2011–12	Division 1 Féminine	22	10	5	2	—		4	1	31	13
Paris Saint-Germain	2012–13	Division 1 Féminine	21	6	5	2	—		0	0	26	8
Paris Saint-Germain	2013–14	Division 1 Féminine	22	6	3	0	—		1	0	26	6
Paris Saint-Germain	2014–15	Division 1 Féminine	17	11	3	2	—		7	1	27	14
Paris Saint-Germain	2015–16	Division 1 Féminine	7	3	2	0	—		4	0	13	3
Paris Saint-Germain	Total		89	36	18	6	–		16	2	123	44
Lyon	2016–17	Division 1 Féminine	2	0	4	1	—		0	0	6	1
Lyon	2017–18	Division 1 Féminine	0	0	0	0	—		0	0	0	0
Lyon	Total		2	0	4	1	–		0	0	6	1
Lille (loan)	2017–18	Division 1 Féminine	10	1	0	0	—		0	0	10	1
Dijon	2018–19	Division 1 Féminine	17	6	2	3	—		0	0	19	9
West Ham United	2019–20	Women's Super League	14	2	0	0	4	5	—		18	7
West Ham United	2020–21	Women's Super League	18	3	0	0	2	0	—		20	3
West Ham United	Total		32	5	0	0	6	5	—		38	10
Everton	2021–22	Women's Super League	20	0	3	1	4	0	—		27	1
Aston Villa	2022–23	Women's Super League	21	5	4	1	5	1	—		30	7
Aston Villa	2023–24	Women's Super League	17	1	1	0	5	0	—		23	1
Aston Villa	2024–25	Women's Super League	3	0	0	0	1	0	—		4	0
Aston Villa	Total		41	6	5	1	11	1	—		57	8
San Diego Wave FC	2025	NWSL	26	5	—		1 (Note: Appearance(s) in the NWSL playoffs)	0	—		27	5
Career total			260	60	34	13	22	6	16	2	332	81

=== International ===
As of match played 4 April 2025

Appearances and goals by national team and year
National team	Year	Apps	Goals
France	2014	5	1
France	2015	9	1
France	2016	5	0
France	2018	3	2
France	2019	3	0
France	2020	6	1
France	2021	8	4
France	2022	10	1
France	2023	13	2
France	2024	13	1
France	2025	1	0
Total		76	13

Scores and results list France's goal tally first, score column indicates score after each Dali goal.

List of international goals scored by Kenza Dali
No.	Date	Venue	Opponent	Score	Result	Competition
1	26 November 2014	Stade de Gerland, Lyon, France	Brazil	2–0	2–0	Friendly
2	6 March 2015	Estádio Algarve, Loulé, Portugal	Denmark	3–0	4–1	Friendly
3	9 October 2018	Stade des Alpes, Grenoble, France	Cameroon	4–0	6–0	Friendly
4	9 October 2018	Stade des Alpes, Grenoble, France	Cameroon	5–0	6–0	Friendly
5	1 December 2020	Stade de la Rabine, Vannes, France	Kazakhstan	6–0	12–0	2022 UEFA Women's Euro qualification
6	10 June 2021	Stade de la Meinau, Strasbourg, France	Germany	1–0	1–0	Friendly
7	22 October 2021	Stade Dominique Duvauchelle, Créteil, France	Estonia	11–0	11–0	2023 FIFA Women's World Cup qualification
8	26 October 2021	Astana Arena, Nur-Sultan, Kazakhstan	Kazakhstan	2–0	5–0	2023 FIFA Women's World Cup qualification
9	26 November 2021	Stade de la Rabine, Vannes, France	Kazakhstan	6–0	6–0	2023 FIFA Women's World Cup qualification
10	2 September 2022	Lilleküla Stadium, Tallinn, Estonia	Estonia	2–0	9–0	2023 FIFA Women's World Cup qualification
11	18 February 2023	Stade Raymond Kopa, Angers, France	Uruguay	2–1	5–1	2023 Tournoi de France
12	8 August 2023	Hindmarsh Stadium, Adelaide, Australia	Morocco	2–0	4–0	2023 FIFA Women's World Cup
13	25 July 2024	Parc Olympique Lyonnais, Décines-Charpieu, France	Colombia	2–0	3–2	2024 Summer Olympics

== Honors ==
Individual

- NWSL Best XI First Team: 2026
