= Maisy Barker =

English footballer

Personal information
- Full name: Maisy Barker
- Date of birth: 25 March 2002 (age 24)
- Place of birth: England
- Height: 1.69 m (5 ft 7 in)
- Position: Defender

Team information
- Current team: Oxford United
- Number: 21

Youth career
- Middlesex Academy
- Chelsea

Senior career*
Years	Team	Apps	(Gls)
2021–2023	West Ham United	3	(0)
2023	→ Hashtag United (loan)	7	
2023–2025	Ipswich Town		
2025–	Oxford United	2	(0)

International career
2018–2019	England U17	9	(0)
- * Club domestic league appearances and goals as of 29 August 2025

Maisy Barker (born 25 March 2002) is a footballer who plays as a defender for Oxford United.

== Club career ==
Barker made her senior debut for West Ham in the 2020/21 WSL campaign, in a 4–0 defeat against Manchester City Women. Barker was subbed on in the 71st minute, replacing Lois Joel. Her second appearance came in the 89th minute away at Manchester United Women in a 2–0 defeat, replacing Redish Kvamme. Barker also made two appearances in the FA Women's Continental Tyres League Cup against Charlton Athletic Women and Chelsea Women, in a 4–0 victory and a 6–0 defeat respectively.

In July 2023, Barker joined Ipswich Town Women on a one-year deal for the 2023/24 season. Barker extended her stay a year later. She was part of the Ipswich Town Women team that secured promotion from the FA Women's National League Southern Premier Division in the 2024/25 season. Barker contributed four goals and five assists in her 28 appearances.

== International career ==
Barker represented England at an under-17 level, between the years 2018 and 2019.
