= Emily Moore (soccer) =

Canadian soccer player (born 1998)

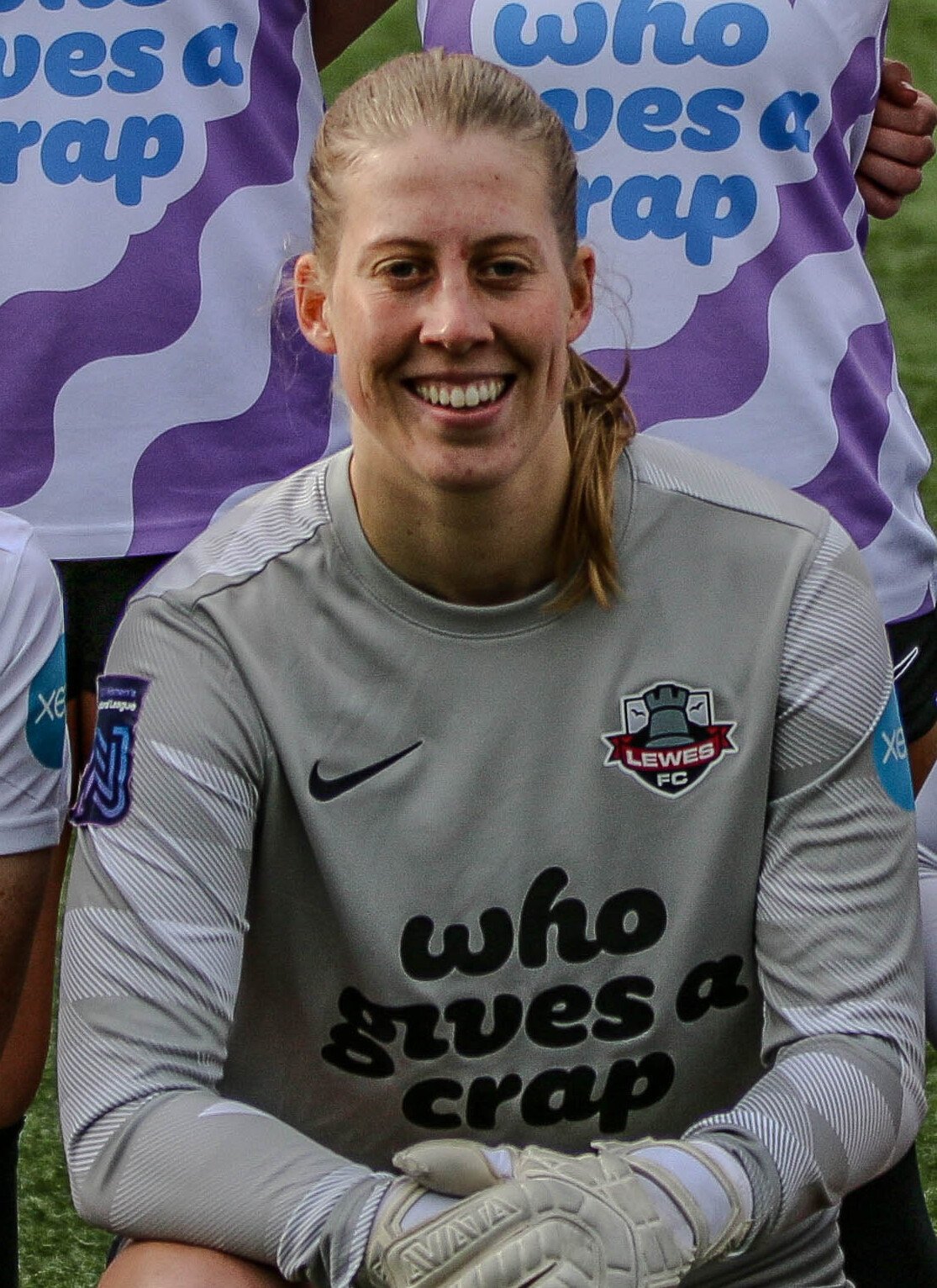
- Moore with the Lewes starting 11 in October 2024

Personal information
- Date of birth: October 16, 1998 (age 27)
- Place of birth: Esquimalt, British Columbia
- Height: 6 ft 0 in (1.83 m)
- Position: Goalkeeper

Team information
- Current team: Lewes
- Number: 1

Youth career
- Gorge FC
- Victoria Highlanders
- Vancouver Island Wave

College career
Years	Team	Apps	(Gls)
2016–2022	UBC Thunderbirds	62	(0)

Senior career*
Years	Team	Apps	(Gls)
2022	West Ham	0	(0)
2022–	Lewes		
- * Club domestic league appearances and goals

Emily Moore (born October 16, 1998) is a Canadian professional soccer player who plays as a goalkeeper for FA Women's National League South Club Lewes. Moore is the first U Sports player to sign for a club in the Women's Super League.

== Early life ==
Moore began playing as a goalkeeper at the age of 12. In her youth career Moore was part of a squad which finished 5th out of 92 teams at the Gothia Cup.

== College career ==
In her freshman year with the UBC Thunderbirds, Moore made 5 appearances and conceded only 1 goal.

Moore was named to the all-star team in the 2019 U Sports women's soccer championship. Moore helped the Thunderbirds to win the 2019 national title, making 5 saves in the final. On the way to winning the championship, Moore was named as the player of the game in UBC's 1–0 semifinal win over Acadia.

In 2022, Moore was named UBC's top graduating female athlete, winning the 2022 May Brown Award. Moore graduated with a degree in visual arts and graphic design.

== Club career ==
=== West Ham United ===
Moore trained with West Ham in the preseason previous to her signing for the club, but did not remain permanently as she returned to complete her final year at UBC. Moore signed for West Ham permanently in January 2022 and was soon being named to the bench. On June 1, 2022, it was announced that Moore was departing West Ham upon the expiry of her contract.

=== Lewes F.C. ===
Moore signed for Women's Championship side Lewes in September 2022. Moore has stated that the club's commitment to gender equity and her experience that Lewes "cares about the person before the player" made the club attractive to her as a player. In her first season with the club Moore served as backup to Sophie Whitehouse. Moore was part of the Lewes side which was relegated from the Women's Championship in the 2023-24 season. On July 10, 2024, it was announced that Moore had extended her time with Lewes for a further season. By August 24, 2024, Moore was one of only three Lewes players to have been retained by the club from the previous season. Moore was named player of the match in a 1–1 draw against Watford on September 1, 2024. Moore played in Lewes' 0–0 victory on penalties to win the 2025 Sussex Women's Challenge Cup. On July 26, 2025, Lewes announced that Moore would be continuing to play for the club for the 2025-26 season.
