= Lois Joel =

Welsh footballer (born 1999)

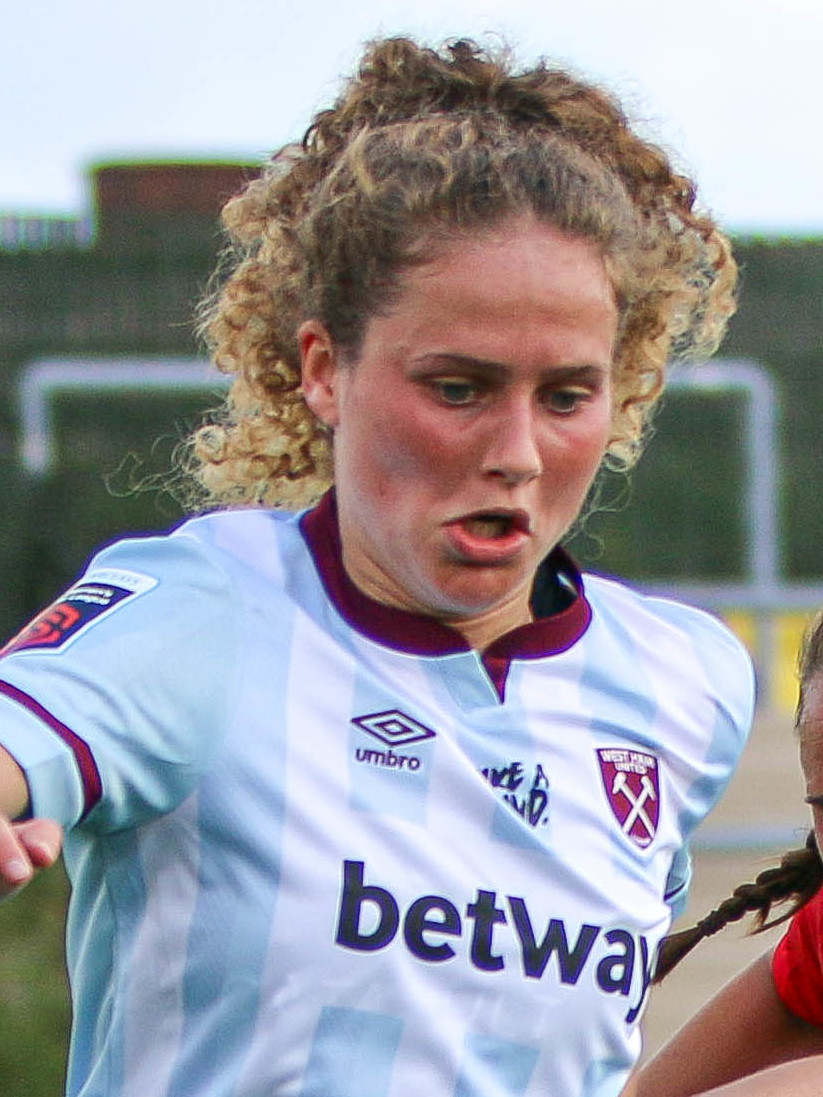
- Joel in August 2021

Personal information
- Full name: Lois Kathleen Joel
- Date of birth: 2 June 1999 (age 27)
- Place of birth: North Finchley, England
- Height: 5 ft 5 in (1.65 m)
- Positions: Defender; forward

Team information
- Current team: Newcastle United
- Number: 22

Youth career
- Whetstone Wanderers
- Watford
- Arsenal
- Chelsea

College career
Years	Team	Apps	(Gls)
2017–2018	West Virginia Mountaineers	33	(1)
2019	North Carolina Tar Heels	25	(0)

Senior career*
Years	Team	Apps	(Gls)
2020–2022	West Ham United	13	(0)
2022–2024	London City Lionesses	34	(2)
2024–	Newcastle United	35	(3)

International career^{‡}
2016	England U17	5	(0)
2017	England U19	2	(1)
2024–	Wales	13	(0)
- * Club domestic league appearances and goals as of 12 December 2025 ‡ National team caps and goals as of 18 October 2026

Lois Kathleen Joel (born 2 June 1999) is a professional footballer who plays as a defender for Women's Super League 2 (WSL 2) club Newcastle United. Born in England, she plays for the Wales national team.

Born in North Finchley, London, Joel played youth football for the academies of Watford, Arsenal and Chelsea. She began her club career at Women's Super League (WSL) club West Ham United, before moving to the WSL 2 to play for London City Lionesses and later Newcastle United.

Having represented England at under-17 and under-19 level, Joel switched allegiance to play for Wales in 2024, qualifying through her grandmother (who was from Barry). She was part of Wales' 26-player squad for the UEFA Women's Euro 2025 in Switzerland, the first ever major senior women's football tournament to feature Wales.

== Early life ==
Joel grew up in the London suburb of North Finchley and attended Moss Hall School and St Michael's Catholic Grammar School. She played football in the youth systems of Watford and Arsenal before joining the Chelsea academy and was a member of the team that won the 2016–17 FA WSL Academy League Southern Division title. She was involved in one senior matchday squad, an unused substitute on 2 July 2016 as Chelsea were eliminated by second-tier London Bees on penalties in the first round of the 2016 WSL Cup.

== College career ==
In August 2017, Joel enrolled at West Virginia University. She played college soccer for two seasons with the West Virginia Mountaineers, making 33 appearances all as a substitute and scoring one goal and one assist. The Mountaineers won the 2018 Big 12 Conference Women's Soccer Tournament and earned berths to the NCAA College Cup both years.

In May 2019, Joel transferred to North Carolina to play for the Tar Heels. She was signed on the recommendation of England youth national team teammates Lotte Wubben-Moy and Alessia Russo who had been with the Tar Heels since 2017. Having played multiple positions with West Virginia, Joel was noted by head coach Anson Dorrance for her pace, fitness and versatility. In her first season with the team, Joel made 25 appearances including eight starts and registered eight assists. The Tar Heels won both the 2019 ACC regular season and 2019 ACC Tournament, and finished runners-up in the 2019 NCAA College Cup final.

== Club career ==
=== West Ham United ===
On 2 October 2020, Joel returned to England amid uncertainty around the US college season due to the COVID-19 pandemic and signed a short-term contract with FA WSL team West Ham United. She signed on non-contract terms in order to preserve her final year of college eligibility. She made her debut on 18 October as a 73rd-minute substitute for Laura Vetterlein in a 4–2 WSL loss to Manchester United. Ahead of the 2021–22 season, Joel signed a one-year contract extension.

=== Newcastle United ===
After being released by London City Lionesses at the close of the 2023-24 season, Lois signed for Newcastle United in September 2024. Lois made her debut as a second half substitute against her former club, London City Lionesses gaining an away draw.

== International career ==
=== Youth ===
Joel has represented England at under-17 and under-19 level. She competed at the 2016 UEFA U-17 Championship as England topped the group by winning all three of their group stage games before losing to Germany in the semi-finals. They beat Norway in the third-place playoff, qualifying the team for the 2016 FIFA U-17 World Cup in Jordan. Joel made one appearance at the World Cup in a 3–0 quarter-final defeat to eventual winners Japan.

On 18 October 2017, Joel scored her first international goal at under-19 level during a 9–0 win over Kazakhstan in 2018 UEFA Under-19 Championship qualification.

=== Senior ===
In 2024, Joel was called up to the Wales national team and received her first cap in a 2–0 win against the Republic of Ireland in February 2024. In June 2025, Joel was named in Wales' squad for UEFA Women's Euro 2025, having 9 caps for Cymru.

== Career statistics ==
=== Club ===
As of matches played 4 May 2025

Appearances and goals by club, season and competition
Club	Season	League			National Cup		League Cup		Total	
Club	Season	Division	Apps	Goals	Apps	Goals	Apps	Goals	Apps	Goals
West Ham United	2020–21	Women's Super League	5	0	3	0	4	0	12	0
West Ham United	2021–22	Women's Super League	10	0	3	0	4	0	17	0
West Ham United	Total		15	0	6	0	8	0	29	0
London City Lionesses	2022-23	Women's Championship	19	0	2	0	3	0	24	0
London City Lionesses	2023-24	Women's Championship	15	2	3	0	4	1	22	3
London City Lionesses	Total		35	2	5	0	7	1	46	3
Newcastle United	2024-25	Women's Championship	19	0	3	0	3	1	25	1
Newcastle United	2025-26	Women's Super League 2	7	1	1	0	2	1	10	2
Newcastle United	Total		26	1	4	0	5	1	35	3
Career total			95	3	18	0	23	1	136	6

== International appearances ==
As of matches played 3 June 2025. Statistics from the Football Association of Wales

Appearances and goals by national team and year
National team	Year	Apps	Goals
Wales	2024	5	0
Wales	2025	4	0
Total		9	0

== Honours ==
=== College ===
West Virginia Mountaineers

- Big 12 Conference Women's Soccer Tournament: 2018

North Carolina Tar Heels

- Atlantic Coast Conference regular season: 2019
- ACC Women's Soccer Tournament: 2019
- NCAA Division I College Cup runners-up: 2019
