= Dagný Brynjarsdóttir =

Icelandic footballer

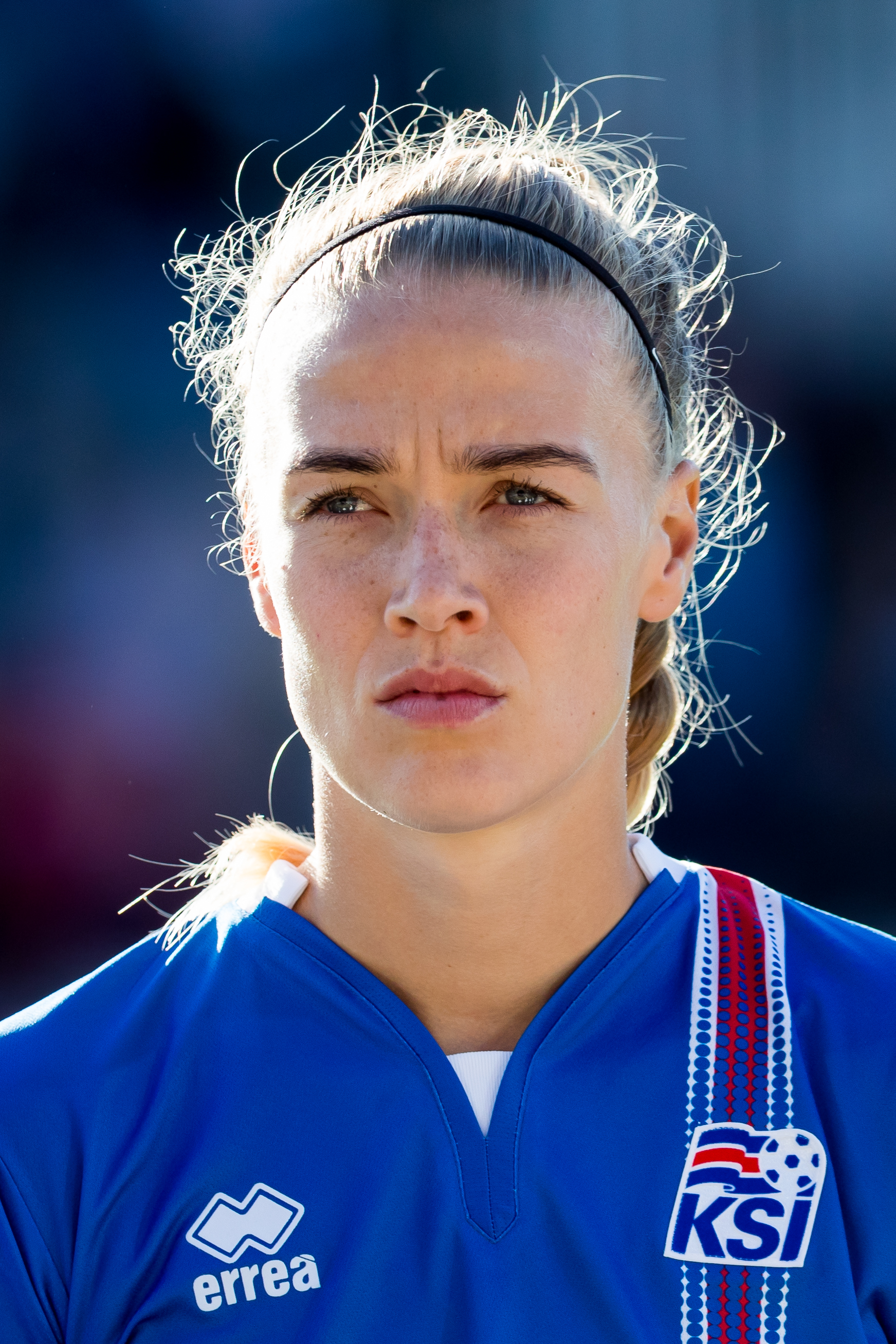
- Dagný Brynjarsdóttir in October 2017.

Personal information
- Date of birth: 10 August 1991 (age 35)
- Place of birth: Hella, Iceland
- Height: 1.80 m (5 ft 11 in)
- Position: Midfielder

College career
Years	Team	Apps	(Gls)
2011–2014	Florida State Seminoles	87	(44)

Senior career*
Years	Team	Apps	(Gls)
2006	KFR/Ægir	11	(3)
2007–2013	Valur	77	(22)
2014–2015	Selfoss	28	(17)
2015	Bayern Munich	9	(2)
2016–2019	Portland Thorns	53	(6)
2020	Selfoss	13	(5)
2021–2025	West Ham United	87	(18)

International career^{‡}
2007–2008	Iceland U17	10	(4)
2007–2009	Iceland U19	16	(0)
2012	Iceland U23	1	(1)
2010–2023	Iceland	122	(38)
- * Club domestic league appearances and goals as of 19:25, 25 September 2023 (UTC) ‡ National team caps and goals as of 19:25, 25 September 2023 (UTC)

Dagný Brynjarsdóttir (Icelandic: [ˈtakni ˈprɪnjarsˌtouhtɪr̥]; born 10 August 1991) is a former Icelandic professional footballer. She previously played for West Ham United, Bayern Munich, Portland Thorns, Selfoss, and collegiate soccer for the Florida State Seminoles. She was capped over 100 times by Iceland.

== Early life ==
Dagný started playing football when she was six years old, with her first club, KFR from Hella and Hvolsvöllur. She played for them in 2006 as they competed in a joint effort with Ægir from Þorlákshöfn. From 2007 to 2013 she played for Valur from Reykjavík in the best women's league in Iceland, Úrvalsdeild as it was then called.

In 2011 Dagný began attending Florida State University and began playing for Florida State Seminoles. She returned to Iceland to play for Valur during the summer months.

== College career ==
=== Florida State Seminoles ===
Dagný attended Florida State University where she was a four-year starter from 2011 to 2014 for the Seminoles in the midfielder position. She helped lead the Seminoles to a national championship in 2014. Dagný holds the school record for 19 game-winning goals and is second in total goals (44), shots (232), and points (111). She was a first team All-American in 2014 and the runner-up for the MAC Hermann Trophy, given annually to the best college female soccer player. She was named Soccer America 2014 Women's Player of the Year. She was also named as a first team Scholar All-American by the National Soccer Coaches Association of America.

== Club career ==
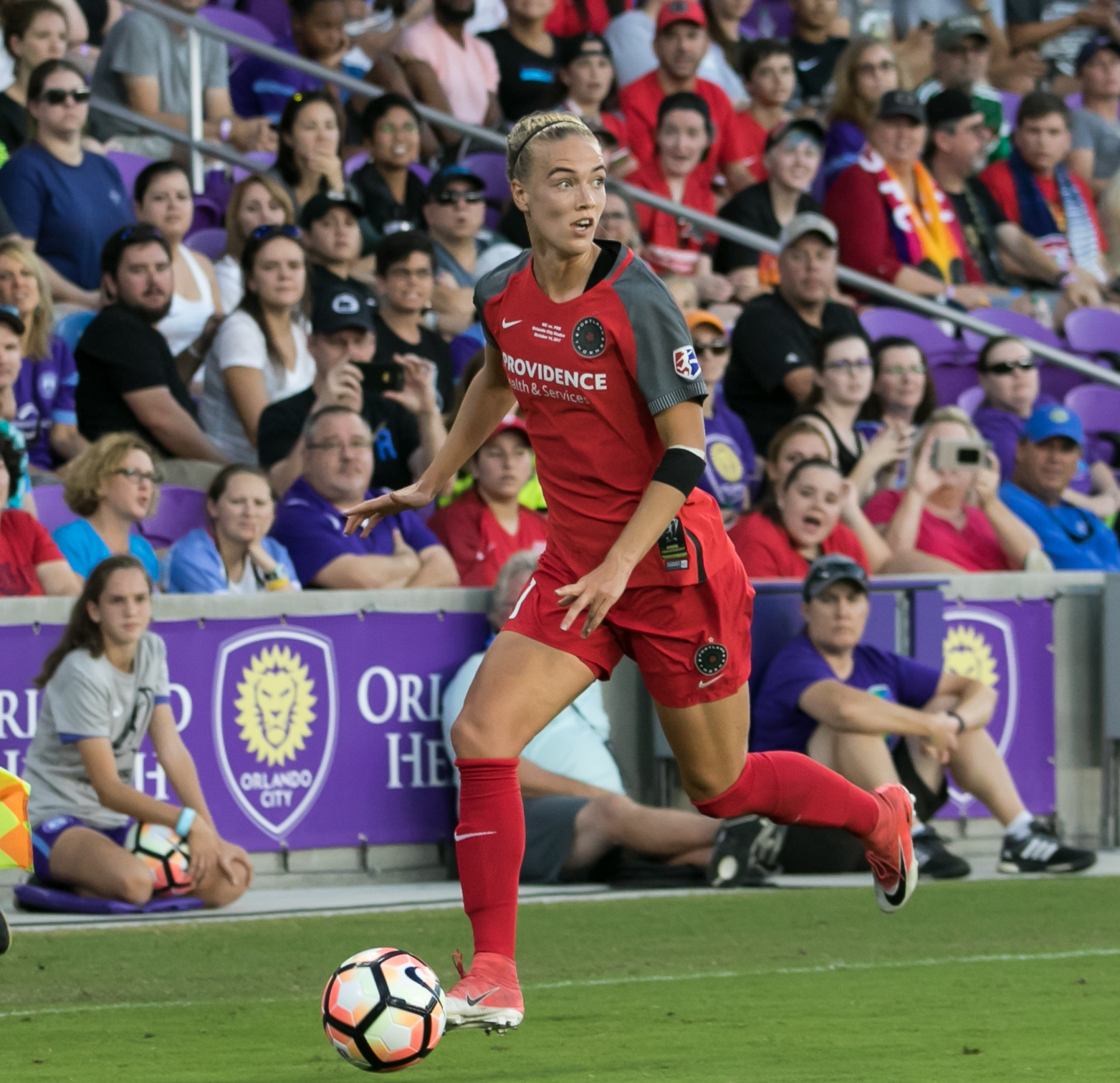
Dagný playing in the 2017 NWSL Championship game

=== Selfoss and Bayern München ===
In 2014, Dagný played for Selfoss. In 2015, she signed for the second half of the season to the German Frauen-Bundesliga team Bayern München.

=== Portland Thorns ===
After her career at Florida State, Dagný did not sign up for the 2015 draft to play in the National Women's Soccer League in the United States. In May 2015, she attempted to play during the 2015 season with the Western New York Flash, but was prevented from doing so by league rules.

In October 2015, the Portland Thorns FC announced that they had acquired rights for her from the Boston Breakers and that she would play for the Thorns in the 2016 NWSL season.

After spending the 2016 and 2017 seasons with the Thorns, it was announced that Dagný would miss the 2018 season due to pregnancy. She gave birth to a son in June 2018 and returned to training with the team in March 2019.

=== Selfoss ===
In 2019, Dagný left the Thorns, citing the difficulty of raising her son so far away from her home nation and family, and returned to Iceland to sign with Selfoss.

=== West Ham United ===
On 28 January 2021, Dagný signed for FA WSL side West Ham United. She made her debut for the club in a 2–0 home defeat in a league match against Chelsea on 7 March 2021 She ended her first season campaign with 9 appearances across all competition with no goals. It was not until the 2021–22 season that she scored her first goal for the club in the season opener against Manchester City in a 2–0 league win on 3 October 2021. She then scored West Ham United's extra-time winner at Reading in the FA Women's Cup fifth round on 27 February 2022. She ended the season with 27 appearances for West Ham United in all competitions, scoring six goals.

Prior to the start of the 2022–23 season, Dagný switched her kit number from 32 to 10, following the departure of Kateřina Svitková from the club in the summer. She was then named club captain for the club by manager Paul Konchesky. She would end the season as the club's topscorer with 11 goals in 28 appearances across all competition and named 2022/23 Women's Player of the Year by the supporters.

On 9 August 2023, Dagný announced that she will miss the 2023–24 season after announcing she is expecting her second child.

On 8 March 2024, West Ham United released their original documentary, Ómarsson, which tells the story of Dagný's journey with pregnancy as a professional sportswoman and the barriers faced by female athletes when making the decision to start a family.

On 6 August 2025, it was announced that Dagný was departing West Ham, her contract having expired.

== International career ==
Dagný made her debut for the senior Iceland national football team at the 2010 Algarve Cup; in a 2–0 defeat to the United States on 24 February 2010. She was called up to be part of the national team for the UEFA Women's Euro 2013. In Iceland's final group match against the Netherlands, Dagný headed the only goal of the game to secure her team's place in the quarter-finals. It later emerged that she had played the game with a broken foot, sustained in the previous match against Germany. On 7 April 2022, she played her 100th match for Iceland in a 5–0 win over Belarus in the 2023 FIFA Women's World Cup qualification.

On 13 June 2025, Dagný was called up to the Iceland squad for the UEFA Women's Euro 2025.

== Retirement ==
Dagný announced her retirement from all football via her instagram page on 11 November 2026.

== Personal life ==
Dagný gave birth to son Brynjar Atli in June 2018, making her one of several mothers playing in NWSL. She subsequently married the father, long-term boyfriend Ómar Páll Sigurbjartsson, in July 2019.

In early 2024, Dagný and Ómar Páll welcomed their second child, another boy Andreas Leo. In April 2026 Byrnjarsdóttir announced the birth of their 3rd child another boy Freyr

== Career statistics ==
=== Club ===
As of match played 27 May 2023

Appearances and goals by club, season and competition
Club	Season	League			National cup (Note: Includes Icelandic Women's Football Cup, Women's FA Cup)		League cup (Note: Includes FA WSL Cup, Icelandic Women's Football League Cup)		Continental (Note: Includes UEFA Women's Champions League)		Other (Note: Include Icelandic Women's Super Cup)		Total	
Club	Season	Division	Apps	Goals	Apps	Goals	Apps	Goals	Apps	Goals	Apps	Goals	Apps	Goals
KFR/Ægir	2006	1. deild karla	11	3	1	0	—		—		—		12	3
Valur	2007	Besta deild kvenna	6	1	0	0	4	3	—		—		10	4
Valur	2008	Besta deild kvenna	9	0	2	0	7	5	—		—		18	5
Valur	2009	Besta deild kvenna	17	3	3	3	2	4	2	0	1	0	25	10
Valur	2010	Besta deild kvenna	14	6	2	1	1	0	2	0	1	2	20	9
Valur	2011	Besta deild kvenna	11	4	3	0	0	0	—		1	0	15	4
Valur	2012	Besta deild kvenna	12	6	3	1	0	0	—		1	1	16	8
Valur	2013	Besta deild kvenna	8	2	2	0	0	0	—		—		10	2
Valur	Total		77	22	16	5	14	12	4	0	4	3	114	42
Selfoss	2014	Besta deild kvenna	11	7	3	2	—		—		—		14	9
Selfoss	2015	Besta deild kvenna	17	10	4	2	—		—		—		21	12
Selfoss	Total		28	17	7	4	—		—		—		35	21
Bayern Munich	2014–15	Frauen-Bundesliga	9	2	0	0	—		—		—		9	2
Portland Thorns	2016	NWSL	18	5	—		—		—		—		18	5
Portland Thorns	2017	NWSL	13	0	—		—		—		—		13	0
Portland Thorns	2019	NWSL	22	1	—		—		—		—		22	1
Portland Thorns	Total		53	6	—		—		—		—		53	6
Selfoss	2019	Besta deild kvenna	0	0	0	0	2	0	—		—		2	0
Selfoss	2020	Besta deild kvenna	13	5	2	1	1	0	—		1	0	16	6
Selfoss	Total		13	5	2	1	3	0	—		1	0	18	6
West Ham United	2020–21	FA WSL	9	0	0	0	0	0	—		—		9	0
West Ham United	2021–22	FA WSL	20	4	4	2	3	0	—		—		27	6
West Ham United	2022–23	WSL	21	6	2	2	5	3	—		—		28	11
West Ham United	Total		50	10	6	4	8	3	—		—		64	17
Career Total			241	65	32	14	22	15	4	0	5	3	304	97

=== International ===
As of match played 12 April 2023

Appearances and goals by national team and year
National team	Year	Apps	Goals
Iceland	2010	9	0
Iceland	2011	8	1
Iceland	2012	6	2
Iceland	2013	13	1
Iceland	2014	12	7
Iceland	2015	9	3
Iceland	2016	12	5
Iceland	2017	7	3
Iceland	2019	9	3
Iceland	2020	5	4
Iceland	2021	7	3
Iceland	2022	11	5
Iceland	2023	5	0
Total		113	38

Scores and results list Iceland's goal tally first, score column indicates score after each Brynjarsdóttir goal.

List of international goals scored by Dagný Brynjarsdóttir
No.	Date	Venue	Opponent	Score	Result	Competition	Ref.
1	26 October 2011	The Oval, Belfast, Northern Ireland	Northern Ireland	0–2	2–0	UEFA Women's Euro 2013 qualifying	
2	21 June 2012	Lovech Stadium, Lovech, Bulgaria	Bulgaria	0–6	0–10	UEFA Women's Euro 2013 qualifying	
3	25 October 2012	Laugardalsvöllur, Reykjavík, Iceland	Ukraine	3–2	3–2	UEFA Women's Euro 2013 qualifying play-off round	
4	17 July 2013	Myresjöhus Arena, Växjö, Sweden	Netherlands	0–1	0–1	UEFA Women's Euro 2013	
5	5 April 2014	Ramat Gan Stadium, Ramat Gan, Israel	Israel	0–1	0–1	2015 FIFA Women's World Cup qualification	
6	10 April 2014	Centenary Stadium, Ta' Qali, Malta	Malta	0–4	0–8	2015 FIFA Women's World Cup qualification	
7	10 April 2014	Centenary Stadium, Ta' Qali, Malta	Malta	0–8	0–8	2015 FIFA Women's World Cup qualification	
8	19 June 2014	Laugardalsvöllur, Reykjavík, Iceland	Malta	4–0	5–0	2015 FIFA Women's World Cup qualification	
9	13 September 2014	Laugardalsvöllur, Reykjavík, Iceland	Israel	1–0	3–0	2015 FIFA Women's World Cup qualification	
10	17 September 2014	Laugardalsvöllur, Reykjavík, Iceland	Serbia	5–1	9–1	2015 FIFA Women's World Cup qualification	
11	17 September 2014	Laugardalsvöllur, Reykjavík, Iceland	Serbia	9–1	9–1	2015 FIFA Women's World Cup qualification	
12	22 September 2015	Laugardalsvöllur, Reykjavík, Iceland	Belarus	2–0	2–0	UEFA Women's Euro 2017 qualifying	
13	26 September 2015	Lendava Sports Park, Lendava, Slovenia	Slovenia	0–1	0–6	UEFA Women's Euro 2017 qualifying	
14	26 September 2015	Lendava Sports Park, Lendava, Slovenia	Slovenia	0–6	0–6	UEFA Women's Euro 2017 qualifying	
15	2 March 2016	Estádio Municipal de Lagos, Lagos, Portugal	Belgium	1–2	1–2	2016 Algarve Cup	
16	12 April 2016	FC Minsk Stadium, Minsk, Belarus	Belarus	0–5	0–5	UEFA Women's Euro 2017 qualifying	
17	7 June 2016	Laugardalsvöllur, Reykjavík, Iceland	North Macedonia	8–0	8–0	UEFA Women's Euro 2017 qualifying	
18	16 September 2016	Laugardalsvöllur, Reykjavík, Iceland	Slovenia	2–0	4–0	UEFA Women's Euro 2017 qualifying	
19	16 September 2016	Laugardalsvöllur, Reykjavík, Iceland	Slovenia	3–0	4–0	UEFA Women's Euro 2017 qualifying	
20	20 October 2017	BRITA-Arena, Wiesbaden, Germany	Germany	0–1	2–3	2019 FIFA Women's World Cup qualification	
21	20 October 2017	BRITA-Arena, Wiesbaden, Germany	Germany	1–3	2–3	2019 FIFA Women's World Cup qualification	
22	24 October 2017	Městský stadion, Znojmo, Czech Republic	Czech Republic	0–1	1–1	2019 FIFA Women's World Cup qualification	
23	17 June 2019	Leppävaaran Stadion, Espoo, Finland	Finland	0–2	0–2	2019 FIFA Women's World Cup qualification	
24	29 August 2019	Laugardalsvöllur, Reykjavík, Iceland	Hungary	3–1	4–1	UEFA Women's Euro 2022 qualification	
25	8 October 2019	Daugava Stadium, Liepāja, Latvia	Latvia	0–2	0–6	UEFA Women's Euro 2022 qualification	
26	4 March 2020	Pinatar Arena, Murcia, Spain	Northern Ireland	0–1	0–1	2020 Pinatar Cup	
27	17 September 2020	Laugardalsvöllur, Reykjavík, Iceland	Latvia	3–0	9–0	UEFA Women's Euro 2022 qualification	
28	17 September 2020	Laugardalsvöllur, Reykjavík, Iceland	Latvia	4–0	9–0	UEFA Women's Euro 2022 qualification	
29	17 September 2020	Laugardalsvöllur, Reykjavík, Iceland	Latvia	6–0	9–0	UEFA Women's Euro 2022 qualification	
30	11 June 2021	Laugardalsvöllur, Reykjavík, Iceland	Republic of Ireland	3–0	3–2	Friendly	
31	22 October 2021	Laugardalsvöllur, Reykjavík, Iceland	Czech Republic	2–0	4–0	2023 FIFA Women's World Cup qualification	
32	26 October 2021	Laugardalsvöllur, Reykjavík, Iceland	Cyprus	2–0	5–0	2023 FIFA Women's World Cup qualification	
33	17 February 2022	Dignity Health Sports Park, Carson, United States	New Zealand	1–0	1–0	2022 SheBelieves Cup	
34	7 April 2022	Voždovac Stadium, Belgrade, Serbia	Belarus	0–1	0–5	2023 FIFA Women's World Cup qualification	
35	18 July 2022	New York Stadium, Rotherham, England	France	1–1	1–1	UEFA Women's Euro 2022	
36	2 September 2022	Laugardalsvöllur, Reykjavík, Iceland	Belarus	3–0	6–0	2023 FIFA Women's World Cup qualification	
37	2 September 2022	Laugardalsvöllur, Reykjavík, Iceland	Belarus	5–0	6–0	2023 FIFA Women's World Cup qualification	
38	7 April 2023	Marden Sports Complex, Alanya, Turkey	New Zealand	1–0	1–1	Friendly	

== Honours ==
Valur

- Besta deild kvenna: 2007, 2008, 2009, 2010
- Icelandic Women's Football Cup: 2009, 2010, 2011
- Icelandic Women's Football Cup runner-up: 2012
- Icelandic Women's Football League Cup: 2007, 2010
- Icelandic Women's Football League Cup runner-up: 2008, 2011, 2012, 2013
- Icelandic Women's Super Cup: 2007, 2008, 2009, 2010, 2011
- Icelandic Women's Super Cup runner-up: 2012

Florida State Seminoles

- ACC: 2011, 2013, 2014
- ACC Regular Season: 2012, 2014
- NCAA: 2014

FC Bayern Munich

- Frauen-Bundesliga: 2015

Portland Thorns

- NWSL Shield (regular season champion): 2016
- NWSL Championship (playoff champion): 2017

Selfoss

- Icelandic Women's Super Cup: 2020

Individual

- Hermann Trophy Finalist: 2014

== See also ==
- List of foreign NWSL players
- List of Florida State University people
