= Olli Harder =

New Zealand association football coach (born 1986)

Personal information
- Date of birth: 31 January 1986 (age 40)
- Place of birth: Auckland, New Zealand
- Position: Goalkeeper

Managerial career
- Years: Team
- 2016–2019: Klepp IL women
- 2020–2022: West Ham United Women
- 2022–2023: SK Brann Kvinner

Oliver Harder (born 31 January 1986) is a New Zealand, UEFA pro licensed coach who is currently coaching at Norwegian club Viking FK. Harder has previously managed SK Brann Kvinner where he won both the Norwegian Cup and League title during the 2022 Toppserien season, West Ham United Women in the WSL and Klepp IL in the Norwegian Toppserien, as well as several clubs across the United States, China and New Zealand.

== Playing career ==
Harder played association football for two clubs in the New Zealand Football Championship as a goalkeeper.

== Managerial career ==
Harder has coached in the United States, China, Norway and England. In the United States, he coached in the Connecticut Junior Soccer Association league system. He was an assistant coach in the American collegiate soccer system for the NJIT Highlanders and the Yale Bulldogs. He worked for Club Football China.

In 2017, Harder became head coach of Klepp IL women's football team. In the three seasons he was in charge, they finished fourth, second and third respectively. Klepp's 2017 finish was the first time in 20 years that they had finished in the top four in the league. He was nominated for the Norwegian Coach of the Year award in 2017 and 2018. Harder left Klepp at the end of the 2019.

In December 2019, Harder became assistant manager of the Sandnes Ulf men's team. In the 2020 season, Sandnes Ulf finished seventh in the 1. divisjon, and he left the role at the end of the 2020 season. He had also been an assistant manager of the Norwegian Women's under-23 National team.

In December 2020, Harder was appointed head coach of West Ham United Women, on a two-and-a-half-year contract. He replaced Matt Beard as head coach. Harder's first scheduled match in charge of West Ham against Manchester City was postponed due to COVID-19 positive tests in the Manchester City squad. He led West Ham to sixth place in the 2021–22 FA WSL, with their highest ever points total in a season. He resigned on 8 May 2022. In 2022, Harder also achieved his UEFA Pro License.

Harder returned to Norway in June 2022, being named as the new director of sports of SK Brann Kvinner. When Brann manager Alexander Straus left for Bayern Munich women, Harder took over as manager in July 2022. After winning both the 2022 Toppserien and the Norwegian Women's Cup, Harder mutually terminated his employment in May 2023; SK Brann were fourth in the league at the time. In June 2023, Harder then joined the Norway men's under-21 team as an assistant manager for their matches against Scotland. He also worked as a coach for Norway women's under-23s team. In 2024, Harder became a coach at Viking FK; as of 2025, he was the head coach of the under-19s team there.

== Personal life ==
Harder was born in New Zealand to German parents. He has a degree in sports science from Unitec Institute of Technology and studied for one semester at Virginia Tech. In 2025, he appeared on the Norwegian television show Bakemesterskapet.
