= 2026–27 Aston Villa W.F.C. season =

Aston Villa
2026–27 season
- Head coach: Natalia Arroyo (until 29 September); Brian Sørensen (caretaker; from 29 September)
- Stadium: Villa Park, Aston (league matches); Bescot Stadium, Walsall (cup matches)
Home colours	Away colours	Third colours

The 2026–27 Aston Villa W.F.C. season is the club's 31st season under their Aston Villa affiliation, the organisation's 53rd overall season in existence, and their seventh season in the Women's Super League, the highest level of the football pyramid. Along with competing in the WSL, the club will also contest two domestic cup competitions: the FA Cup and the WSL Players Cup.

== Season summary ==
On 9 July 2026, it was announced that the club would face OL Lyonnes in a pre-season friendly behind closed doors.

On 27 July 2026, the club announced that Noelle Maritz had extended her contract.

On 29 September 2026, Aston Villa announced the sacking of Natalia Arroyo, with technical director Brian Sørensen taking over as caretaker manager. On 16 October, it was announced that Sørensen would stay on as interim head coach until the end of the season.

== Squad ==
As of 30 August 2026

No.	Nat	Name	Date of birth (age)	Signed from	Since
Goalkeepers
1	(England)	Emily Ramsey	16 November 2000 (age 26)	Free agent	2026
23	(Japan)	Akane Okuma	15 September 2004 (age 22)	(Japan) INAC Kobe Leonessa	2026
26	(England)	Ellie Roebuck	23 September 1999 (age 27)	(Spain) Barcelona	2025
40	(Wales)	Soffia Kelly	6 March 2007 (age 19)	Academy	2025
42	(England)	Lily Clark	13 September 2008 (age 18)		2025
Defenders
3	(Norway)	Mathilde Harviken	29 December 2001 (age 24)	(Italy) Juventus	2026
4	(Republic of Ireland)	Anna Patten	20 April 1999 (age 27)	(England) Arsenal	2022
14	(Netherlands)	Lynn Wilms	3 October 2000 (age 26)	(Germany) VfL Wolfsburg	2025
15	(England)	Lucy Parker	18 November 1998 (age 28)	(England) West Ham United	2023
16	(Switzerland)	Noelle Maritz	23 December 1995 (age 30)	(England) Arsenal	2024
22	(Nigeria)	Rofiat Imuran	17 June 2004 (age 22)	(England) London City Lionesses	2026
24	(France)	Océane Deslandes	26 July 2000 (age 26)	(France) Montpellier	2025
33	(England)	Katie Scott	24 September 2009 (age 17)	Academy	2025
38	(England)	Rachel Maltby	25 March 2007 (age 19)	Academy	2025
Midfielders
5	(Norway)	Justine Kielland	22 November 2002 (age 24)	(Germany) VfL Wolfsburg	2026
6	(France)	Oriane Jean-François	14 August 2001 (age 25)	(England) Chelsea	2026
7	(England)	Missy Bo Kearns	14 April 2001 (age 25)	(England) Liverpool	2024
8	(Netherlands)	Jill Baijings	23 February 2001 (age 25)	(Germany) Bayern Munich	2024
11	(Norway)	Kamilla Melgård	16 December 2005 (age 20)	(Spain) Madrid CFF	2026
21	(England)	Lucia Kendall	20 May 2004 (age 22)	(England) Southampton	2025
25	(Scotland)	Miri Taylor	2 February 2000 (age 26)	(England) Liverpool	2024
Forwards
9	(England)	Rachel Daly	6 December 1991 (age 34)	(United States) Houston Dash	2022
13	(Japan)	Maya Hijikata	13 April 2004 (age 22)	(Japan) Tokyo Verdy Beleza	2025
17	(Netherlands)	Chasity Grant	19 April 2001 (age 25)	(Netherlands) Ajax	2024
18	(England)	Georgia Mullett	16 September 2005 (age 21)	Academy	2022
19	(England)	Lily Murphy	13 February 2006 (age 20)	(England) Manchester City (loan)	2026
20	(Denmark)	Amalie Vangsgaard	29 November 1996 (age 29)	(Italy) Juventus	2026
27	(Scotland)	Mia McAulay	15 August 2006 (age 20)	(Scotland) Rangers	2026

== Pre–season ==
Aston Villa announced their pre-season schedule on 6 August 2026.

9 August 2026 Friendly	Aston Villa	N/A	Ipswich Town	Bodymoor Heath
		Report		Stadium: Bodymoor Heath Training Ground; Attendance: Behind-closed-doors

12 August 2026 Friendly	Aston Villa	N/A	Sunderland	Bodymoor Heath
		Report		Stadium: Bodymoor Heath Training Ground; Attendance: Behind-closed-doors

16 August 2026 Friendly	Paris FC	1–4	Aston Villa	Herzogenaurach
	Viens 5'	Report	Kendall 11'; Wilms 33'; Melgård 42'; Murphy 89'	Stadium: Adidas Campus; Attendance: Behind-closed-doors

21 August 2026 Friendly	OL Lyonnes	3–1	Aston Villa	Herzogenaurach
10:00	Egurrola 49'; Katoto 76', 82'	Report	Deslandes 39'	Stadium: Adidas Campus; Attendance: Behind-closed-doors

30 August 2026 Friendly	Aston Villa	0–0	West Ham United	Hednesford
14:00		Report		Stadium: Keys Park

== Overall record ==
Competition	First match	Last match	Starting round	Final position	Record							
Competition	First match	Last match	Starting round	Final position	Pld	W	D	L	GF	GA	GD	Win %
Women's Super League	5 September 2026	22 May 2027	Matchday 1	TBC	11	3	5	3	12	17	−5	27.27
FA Cup	January 2027	TBC	Fourth round	TBC	0	0	0	0	0	0	+0	—
Players Cup	23 September 2026	TBC	League phase	TBC	5	3	1	1	9	6	+3	60.00
Total					16	6	6	4	21	23	−2	37.50

Last updated: 22 November 2026
Source: Soccerway

== Women's Super League ==
=== League table ===
Pos	Team	Pld	W	D	L	GF	GA	GD	Pts
6	Arsenal	11	3	6	2	11	11	0	15
7	Brighton & Hove Albion	11	4	2	5	17	16	+1	14
8	Aston Villa	11	3	5	3	12	17	−5	14
9	West Ham United	11	4	1	6	11	19	−8	13
10	Liverpool	11	3	3	5	17	16	+1	12

Updated to match(es) played on 22 November 2026. Source: Women's Super League Table
Rules for classification: 1) Points; 2) Goal difference; 3) Number of goals scored.

==== Results summary ====
Overall								Home						Away					
Pld	W	D	L	GF	GA	GD	Pts	W	D	L	GF	GA	GD	W	D	L	GF	GA	GD
11	3	5	3	12	17	−5	14	2	1	2	5	7	−2	1	4	1	7	10	−3

Last updated: 22 November 2026.
Source: Soccerway

==== Results by round ====
Round	1	2	3	4	5	6	7	8	9	10	11	12	13	14	15	16	17	18	19	20	21	22	23	24	25	26
Ground	A	H	A	A	H	H	A	A	H	H	A	A	H	H	A	H	A	H	H	A	H	A	A	H	H	A
Result	D	L	D	L	D	W	W	D	L	W	D															
Position	7	12	11	13	12	10	8	9	9	7	8															
Points	1	1	2	2	3	6	9	10	10	13	14															

Updated to match(es) played on 22 November 2026. Source: Soccerway
A = Away; H = Home; W = Win; D = Draw; L = Loss

=== Matches ===
The league schedule was released on 30 July 2026.

5 September 2026 1	Chelsea	1–1	Aston Villa	Fulham
12:30 BST	James 11'	Report	Taylor (yellow card) 71'; Buurman 79' (o.g.); Kielland (yellow card) 90+4'	Stadium: Stamford Bridge; Attendance: 7,900; Referee: William Davis

13 September 2026 2	Aston Villa	1–4	Manchester City	Birmingham
18:30 BST	Vangsgaard 42'	Report	Rose 14'; Fowler 29'; Shaw 74'; Harviken 90+3' (o.g.)	Stadium: Villa Park; Attendance: 3,079; Referee: Declan Brown

20 September 2026 3	Brighton & Hove Albion	1–1	Aston Villa	Falmer
14:00 BST	Haley (yellow card) 20'; George 31'	Report	Maritz (yellow card) 86'; Wilms 89'	Stadium: Falmer Stadium; Attendance: 3,137; Referee: Adewunmi Soneye

27 September 2026 4	Tottenham Hotspur	4–0	Aston Villa	Leyton
14:00 BST	Pelova 54', 73'; Dijkstra 81'; Tandberg 88'	Report		Stadium: Brisbane Road; Attendance: 1,038; Referee: Lisa Benn

4 October 2026 5	Aston Villa	1–1	Crystal Palace	Birmingham
14:00 BST	Maritz 55'	Report	Lloyd-Smith (yellow card) 35'; Larkin 74'	Stadium: Villa Park; Attendance: 1,953; Referee: Abigail Byrne

17 October 2026 6	Aston Villa	2–1	Liverpool	Hednesford
14:00 BST	Grant 62'; Fisk 72' (o.g.)	Report	Ramos 16'	Stadium: Keys Park; Referee: Megan Wilson

25 October 2026 7	Everton	2–3	Aston Villa	Liverpool
14:00 GMT	McNamara 79'; Mouchon 90'	Report	Maritz 4'; Vangsgaard 32', 50'	Stadium: Goodison Park; Referee: Abigail Byrne

1 November 2026 8	Arsenal	1–1	Aston Villa	Holloway
12:00 GMT	Russo 85'	Report	Grant 25'	Stadium: Emirates Stadium; Attendance: 23,891; Referee: Megan Wilson

8 November 2026 9	Aston Villa	0–1	Manchester United	Birmingham
12:00 GMT	Kendall (yellow card) 71'	Report	Medina (yellow card) 49'; Zigiotti Olme 72', (yellow card) 88'	Stadium: Villa Park; Attendance: 2,682; Referee: Sophie Dennington

15 November 2026 10	Aston Villa	1–0	Birmingham City	Birmingham
14:00 GMT	Harviken 76'; Deslandes (yellow card) 90+3' (red card) 90+3'	Report	Naalsund (yellow card) 74'	Stadium: Villa Park; Attendance: 5,672; Referee: Lisa Benn

22 November 2026 11	Charlton Athletic	1–1	Aston Villa	Charlton
	Flannery 17' (pen.) (yellow card) 56'	Report	Parker 71'; Jean-François (yellow card) 90+1'	Stadium: The Valley; Referee: Megan Wilson

13 December 2026 12	West Ham	v	Aston Villa	Dagenham
				Stadium: Victoria Road

20 December 2026 13	Aston Villa	v	London City Lionesses	Birmingham
				Stadium: Villa Park

10 January 2027 14	Aston Villa	v	Everton	Birmingham
				Stadium: Villa Park

20 January 2027 15	Crystal Palace	v	Aston Villa	Sutton
				Stadium: Gander Green Lane

24 January 2027 16	Aston Villa	v	Tottenham Hotspur	Birmingham
				Stadium: Villa Park

31 January 2027 17	Birmingham City	v	Aston Villa	Bordesley
				Stadium: St Andrew's

7 February 2027 18	Aston Villa	v	Charlton Athletic	Birmingham
				Stadium: Villa Park

14 February 2027 19	Aston Villa	v	Brighton & Hove Albion	Birmingham
				Stadium: Villa Park

14 March 2027 20	Manchester City	v	Aston Villa	Sportcity
				Stadium: Academy Stadium

17 March 2027 21	Aston Villa	v	Arsenal	Birmingham
19:30 BST				Stadium: Villa Park

28 March 2027 22	Manchester United	v	Aston Villa	Leigh
				Stadium: Leigh Sports Village

4 April 2027 23	Liverpool	v	Aston Villa	Liverpool
				Stadium: Anfield

2 May 2027 24	Aston Villa	v	Chelsea	Birmingham
				Stadium: Villa Park

9 May 2027 25	Aston Villa	v	West Ham	Birmingham
				Stadium: Villa Park

22 May 2027 26	London City Lionesses	v	Aston Villa	Bromley
				Stadium: Hayes Lane

== Women's FA Cup ==
As a member of the first tier, Aston Villa entered the FA Cup in the fourth round proper.

== WSL Players Cup ==
Pos	Grp	Team	Pld	W	PW	PL	L	GF	GA	GD	Pts	Qualification
6	SR	Tottenham Hotspur	5	3	0	2	0	15	2	+13	11	Advance to Knockout Phase
7	SR	West Ham United	5	3	1	0	1	9	4	+5	11	Advance to Knockout Phase
8	NR	Aston Villa	5	3	1	0	1	9	6	+3	11	Advance to Knockout Phase
9	NR	Sunderland	5	3	0	0	2	6	7	−1	9	
10	SR	Crystal Palace	5	2	1	0	2	9	8	+1	8	

Updated to match(es) played on 22 November 2026. Source: WSL Football
Rules for classification: 1) Points; 2) Goal difference; 3) Number of goals scored; 4) Number of wins; 5) Head-to-head record

23 September 2026 1	Nottingham Forest	0–2	Aston Villa	West Bridgford
19:00 BST		Report	Hijikata 66'; Grant 83'	Stadium: City Ground; Attendance: 728; Referee: Callum Parke

30 September 2026 2	Aston Villa	3–1	Newcastle United	Hednesford
19:30 BST	Murphy 10'; Maltby (yellow card) 45'; Kendall 83', 90+2'	Report	Sevenius 26'; Evans (yellow card) 87'	Stadium: Keys Park; Attendance: 535; Referee: Joanne Horwood

21 October 2026 3	Burnley	0–2	Aston Villa	Burnley
19:00 BST		Report	Mullett 5'; Murphy 56'	Stadium: Turf Moor; Referee: Amy Fearn

28 October 2026 4	Aston Villa	1–1 (6–5 p)	Birmingham City	Hednesford
19:30 GMT	Harviken 69'	Report	Levasseur (yellow card) 88'; Harris 90+4'	Stadium: Keys Park; Attendance: 1,548; Referee: Melissa Burgin
	Penalties
	Jean-François (penalty scored); Deslandes (penalty scored); Maltby (penalty missed); Kendall (penalty scored); Harviken (penalty scored); Taylor (penalty scored); Grant (penalty scored)		(penalty scored) Hurtré; (penalty scored) Lee; (penalty missed) Sarri; (penalty scored) Cooke; (penalty scored) Harris; (penalty scored) Herron; (penalty missed) Miyagawa

11 November 2026 5	Liverpool	4–1	Aston Villa	St Helens
19:00 GMT	Agrež (yellow card) 21'; Höbinger 30'; Kapocs 78'; Olsson 85', 89'	Report	Kearns 6'; Taylor (yellow card) 16'; Wilms (yellow card) 20'	Stadium: BrewDog Stadium; Referee: Phoebe Cross

16 December 2026 6	Aston Villa	v	Sheffield United	Hednesford
19:00 GMT				Stadium: Keys Park

== Squad statistics ==
=== Appearances ===
As of 22 November 2026

Players with no appearances are not included on the list, italics indicate a loaned in player.

No.	Pos	Nat	Player	Total		WSL		FA Cup		Players Cup	
No.	Pos	Nat	Player	Apps	Goals	Apps	Goals	Apps	Goals	Apps	Goals
1	GK	(England) ENG	Emily Ramsey	3	0	0	0	0	0	3	0
3	DF	(Norway) NOR	Mathilde Harviken	16	2	11	1	0	0	2+3	1
4	DF	(Republic of Ireland) IRL	Anna Patten	14	0	8+2	0	0	0	3+1	0
5	MF	(Norway) NOR	Justine Kielland	15	0	9+2	0	0	0	3+1	0
6	MF	(France) FRA	Oriane Jean-François	8	0	5+1	0	0	0	1+1	0
7	MF	(England) ENG	Missy Bo Kearns	4	1	0+2	0	0	0	2	1
8	MF	(Netherlands) NED	Jill Baijings	3	0	2+1	0	0	0	0	0
13	FW	(Japan) JPN	Maya Hijikata	12	1	3+4	0	0	0	3+2	1
14	DF	(Netherlands) NED	Lynn Wilms	15	1	11	1	0	0	3+1	0
15	DF	(England) ENG	Lucy Parker	8	1	7+1	1	0	0	0	0
16	DF	(Switzerland) SUI	Noelle Maritz	14	2	11	2	0	0	2+1	0
17	FW	(Netherlands) NED	Chasity Grant	14	3	11	2	0	0	0+3	1
18	FW	(England) ENG	Georgia Mullett	12	1	0+8	0	0	0	4	1
19	FW	(England) ENG	Lily Murphy	13	2	2+6	0	0	0	5	2
20	FW	(Denmark) DEN	Amalie Vangsgaard	13	3	11	3	0	0	0+2	0
21	MF	(England) ENG	Lucia Kendall	12	2	8	0	0	0	1+3	2
22	DF	(Nigeria) NGR	Rofiat Imuran	6	0	0+3	0	0	0	2+1	0
23	GK	(Japan) JPN	Akane Ōkuma	13	0	11	0	0	0	2	0
24	DF	(France) FRA	Océane Deslandes	15	0	6+4	0	0	0	2+3	0
25	MF	(Scotland) SCO	Miri Taylor	16	0	3+8	0	0	0	5	0
27	FW	(Scotland) SCO	Mia McAulay	10	0	2+3	0	0	0	5	0
33	DF	(England) ENG	Katie Scott	4	0	0+1	0	0	0	1+2	0
38	DF	(England) ENG	Rachel Maltby	9	0	0+4	0	0	0	5	0
53	MF	(England) ENG	Imogen Seymour	1	0	0	0	0	0	0+1	0

== Transfers ==
=== Transfers in ===
Date	Position	Nationality	Name	From	Ref.
17 June 2026	FW	(Scotland)	Mia McAulay	(Scotland) Rangers	
30 June 2026	MF	(Norway)	Kamilla Melgård	(Spain) Madrid CFF	
1 July 2026	FW	(Denmark)	Amalie Vangsgaard	(Italy) Juventus	
3 July 2026	MF	(Norway)	Justine Kielland	(Germany) VfL Wolfsburg	
15 July 2026	GK	(England)	Emily Ramsey	(England) Everton	
17 July 2026	DF	(Norway)	Mathilde Harviken	(Italy) Juventus	
21 July 2026	GK	(Japan)	Akane Okuma	(Japan) INAC Kobe Leonessa	
30 August 2026	DF	(Nigeria)	Rofiat Imuran	(England) London City Lionesses	

=== Loans in ===
Date	Position	Nationality	Name	From	Until	Ref.
7 August 2026	FW	(England)	Lily Murphy	(England) Manchester City	End of season	

=== Transfers out ===
Date	Position	Nationality	Name	To	Ref.
7 May 2026	MF	(England)	Lucy Staniforth	Retired	
8 May 2026	FW	(England)	Ebony Salmon	(England) West Ham United	
8 May 2026	MF	(Brazil)	Gabi Nunes	(United States) Orlando Pride	
8 May 2026	GK	(Canada)	Sabrina D'Angelo	(Canada) AFC Toronto	
17 June 2026	FW	(Scotland)	Kirsty Hanson	(England) Tottenham Hotspur	
24 July 2026	DF	(England)	Sarah Mayling	(England) Leicester City	

=== Loans out ===
Date	Position	Nationality	Name	To	Until	Ref.
15 July 2025	DF	(England)	Lydia Sallaway	(Wales) Wrexham	End of season	
25 October 2026	GK	(Wales)	Soffia Kelly	(England) Newcastle United	9 November 2026	
