= 2025–26 Aston Villa W.F.C. season =

Aston Villa
2025–26 season
- Head coach: Natalia Arroyo
- Stadium: Villa Park, Aston (league matches); Bescot Stadium, Walsall (cup matches)
- WSL: 9th
- FA Cup: Fourth round
- League Cup: Group stage
- Top goalscorer: League: Kirsty Hanson (12); All: Kirsty Hanson (12)
- Highest home attendance: 7,944 (vs. Arsenal, 9 May 2026)
- Lowest home attendance: 2,361 (vs. Brighton & Hove Albion, 11 January 2026)
- Average home league attendance: 4,045
- Biggest win: 3–0 v Bristol City (A) (League Cup, 19 October 2025); 3–0 v Liverpool (H) (WSL, 11 December 2025)
- Biggest defeat: 1–6 v Manchester City (A) (WSL, 14 December 2025)
Home colours	Away colours	Third colours

The 2025–26 Aston Villa W.F.C. season was the club's 30th season under their Aston Villa affiliation, the organisation's 52nd overall season in existence, and their sixth season in the Women's Super League, the highest level of the football pyramid. Along with competing in the WSL, the club also contested two domestic cup competitions: the FA Cup and the League Cup.

== Squad ==
As of 18 June 2026

No.	Nat	Name	Date of birth (age)	Signed from	Since
Goalkeepers
1	(Canada)	Sabrina D'Angelo	11 May 1993 (age 33)	(England) Arsenal	2024
26	(England)	Ellie Roebuck	23 September 1999 (age 27)	(Spain) Barcelona	2025
42	(England)	Lily Clark			2025
Defenders
4	(Republic of Ireland)	Anna Patten	20 April 1999 (age 27)	(England) Arsenal	2022
14	(Netherlands)	Lynn Wilms	3 October 2000 (age 26)	(Germany) VfL Wolfsburg	2025
15	(England)	Lucy Parker	18 November 1998 (age 27)	(England) West Ham United	2023
16	(Switzerland)	Noelle Maritz	23 December 1995 (age 30)	(England) Arsenal	2024
24	(France)	Océane Deslandes	26 July 2000 (age 26)	(France) Montpellier	2025
32	(United States)	Jenna Nighswonger	28 November 2000 (age 25)	(England) Arsenal	2026
38	(England)	Rachel Maltby			2025
43	(England)	Katie Scott			2025
Midfielders
5	(England)	Lucy Staniforth	2 October 1992 (age 34)	(England) Manchester United	2023
6	(France)	Oriane Jean-François	14 August 2001 (age 25)	(England) Chelsea	2026
7	(England)	Missy Bo Kearns	14 April 2001 (age 25)	(England) Liverpool	2024
8	(Netherlands)	Jill Baijings	23 February 2001 (age 25)	(Germany) Bayern Munich	2024
21	(England)	Lucia Kendall	20 May 2004 (age 22)	(England) Southampton	2025
25	(Scotland)	Miri Taylor	2 February 2000 (age 26)	(England) Liverpool	2024
Forwards
9	(England)	Rachel Daly	6 December 1991 (age 34)	(United States) Houston Dash	2022
10	(Brazil)	Gabi Nunes	10 March 1997 (age 29)	(Spain) Levante UD	2024
13	(Japan)	Maya Hijikata	13 April 2004 (age 22)	(England) Tokyo Verdy Beleza	2025
17	(England)	Ebony Salmon	27 January 2001 (age 25)	(United States) Houston Dash	2023
18	(England)	Georgia Mullett	16 September 2005 (age 21)	Academy	2022
23	(Netherlands)	Chasity Grant	19 April 2001 (age 25)	(Netherlands) Ajax	2024

== Transfers ==
=== Transfers in ===
Date	Position	Nationality	Name	From	Ref.
7 July 2025	DF	(Netherlands)	Lynn Wilms	(Germany) VfL Wolfsburg	
8 July 2025	GK	(England)	Ellie Roebuck	(Spain) Barcelona	
16 July 2025	MF	(Netherlands)	Jill Baijings	(Germany) Bayern Munich	
23 July 2025	MF	(England)	Lucia Kendall	(England) Southampton	
25 July 2025	DF	(France)	Océane Deslandes	(France) Montpellier	
22 August 2025	FW	(Japan)	Maya Hijikata	(Japan) NTV Tokyo Verdy Beleza	
12 January 2026	MF	(France)	Oriane Jean-François	(England) Chelsea	

=== Loans in ===
Date	Position	Nationality	Name	From	Until	Ref.
10 January 2026	DF	(United States)	Jenna Nighswonger	(England) Arsenal	End of season	

=== Transfers out ===
Date	Position	Nationality	Name	To	Ref.
9 May 2025	DF	(Scotland)	Rachel Corsie	Retired	
9 May 2025	MF	(England)	Jordan Nobbs	(England) Newcastle United	
9 May 2025	DF	(Philippines)	Maz Pacheco	(England) Everton	
9 May 2025	DF	(England)	Danielle Turner	(Australia) Melbourne City	
2 July 2025	FW	(England)	Ruby-Rae Tucker	(England) Southampton	
19 July 2025	GK	(England)	Sophia Poor	(England) London City Lionesses	
8 January 2026	FW	(England)	Katie Robinson	(England) Bristol City	
24 April 2026	DF	(Spain)	Paula Tomás	Retired	

=== Loans out ===
Date	Position	Nationality	Name	To	Until	Ref.
16 July 2025	FW	(England)	Katie Robinson	(England) Everton	2 January 2026	
6 January 2026	DF	(England)	Sarah Mayling	(England) Leicester City	End of season	
31 January 2026	DF	(England)	Lydia Sallaway	(Scotland) Glasgow City	End of season	
31 January 2026	GK	(Wales)	Soffia Kelly	(Scotland) Rangers	End of season	

== Preseason ==
3 August 2025 Friendly	Manchester United (England)	2–0	(England) Aston Villa	Carrington, England
14:00	Galton; George	Report		Stadium: Trafford Training Centre; Attendance: Behind-closed-doors

9 August 2025 Friendly	Aston Villa (England)	5–1	(England) Liverpool	Bodymoor Heath, England
14:00	Hanson 18'; Daly 27' (pen.); Mullett 38'; Baijings 49'; Mayling 60'	Report	Höbinger 12'	Stadium: Bodymoor Heath Training Ground; Attendance: Behind-closed-doors

15 August 2025 Friendly	Paris Saint-Germain (France)	1–1	(England) Aston Villa	Deauville, France
16:00	Elimbi Gilbert	Report	Salmon	Stadium: Stade Commandant Hébert; Attendance: Behind-closed-doors

24 August 2025 Friendly	Leicester City (England)	1–1	(England) Aston Villa	Leicester, England
14:00	Parker 48' (o.g.)	Report	Kearns 76'	Stadium: Belvoir Drive Training Ground; Attendance: Behind-closed-doors

30 August 2025 Friendly	Aston Villa (England)	1–0	(Germany) Union Berlin	Walsall, England
14:00	Daly 35'	Report		Stadium: Bescot Stadium

== Women's Super League ==
=== Results summary ===
Overall								Home						Away					
Pld	W	D	L	GF	GA	GD	Pts	W	D	L	GF	GA	GD	W	D	L	GF	GA	GD
22	5	5	12	28	48	−20	20	2	3	6	14	26	−12	3	2	6	14	22	−8

Last updated: 16 May 2026.
Source: WSL

=== Results by matchday ===
Round	1	2	3	4	5	6	7	8	9	10	11	12	13	14	15	16	17	18	19	20	21	22
Ground	A	H	A	A	H	H	A	H	A	H	A	H	H	A	A	H	H	A	A	H	H	A
Result	D	L	D	W	D	D	W	L	L	W	L	W	L	L	L	L	D	W	L	L	L	L
Position	6	9	10	8	8	8	7	8	8	8	8	6	7	8	8	9	9	8	9	9	9	9

Last updated: 16 May 2026.
Source: WSL

A = Away; H = Home; W = Win; D = Draw; L = Loss

=== Results ===
7 September 2025 1	Brighton & Hove Albion	0–0	Aston Villa	Crawley
12:00	Olislagers (yellow card) 84'; Haley (yellow card) 90+6'	Report	Grant (yellow card) 33'; Deslandes (yellow card) 45+4'; Wilms (yellow card) 47'; Baijings (yellow card) 51'; Taylor (yellow card) 72'; Daly (yellow card) 90+1'	Stadium: Broadfield Stadium; Attendance: 2,219; Referee: Ryan Atkins

14 September 2025 2	Aston Villa	1–3	Chelsea	Aston
14:00	Salmon 34'	Report	Beever-Jones 22'; Bo Kearns 55' (o.g.); Baltimore (yellow card) 63'; Kerr 90+3'; Bright (yellow card) 90+6'	Stadium: Villa Park; Attendance: 4,994; Referee: Stacey Pearson

27 September 2025 4	Arsenal	1–1	Aston Villa	Holloway
12:00 BST	Maanum 10'; Fox (yellow card) 15'; Foord (yellow card) 83'	Report	Deslandes (yellow card) 46'; Wilms (yellow card) 52'; Parker 90+4'	Stadium: Emirates Stadium; Attendance: 24,712; Referee: Lisa Benn

5 October 2025 5	West Ham United	0–2	Aston Villa	Dagenham
12:00	Siren (yellow card) 34'; Asseyi (yellow card) 79'	Report	Kendall (yellow card) 54'; Hanson 60'; Wilms 67'	Stadium: Victoria Road; Attendance: 1,286; Referee: Grace Lowe

12 October 2025 6	Aston Villa	0–0	Leicester City	Aston
14:00		Report	Tierney (yellow card) 80'	Stadium: Villa Park; Attendance: 2,486; Referee: Melissa Burgin

2 November 2025 7	Aston Villa	3–3	Everton	Aston
14:00	Mullet 45+8'; Maritz (yellow card) 54'; Hanson 59'; Mace 74' (og.)	Report	Gago 11', 90+4'; Hayashi (yellow card) 55'; Kitagawa 70'	Stadium: Villa Park; Attendance: 2,678; Referee: Stacey Fullicks

8 November 2025 8	Manchester United	0–1	Aston Villa	Leigh
12:30		Report	Taylor 35'	Stadium: Leigh Sports Village; Attendance: 3,434; Referee: Abigail Byrne

16 November 2025 9	Aston Villa	1–3	London City Lionesses	Aston
14:00	Hanson 33'; Taylor (yellow card) 45+5'	Report	Kumagai 12', 55'; Goodwin 51'; Asllani (yellow card) 68'	Stadium: Villa Park; Attendance: 2,903; Referee: Samuel Allison

7 December 2025 10	Tottenham Hotspur	2–1	Aston Villa	Leyton
14:00	Hunt (yellow card) 29'; England 85'; Holdt 90+5'	Report	Deslandes (yellow card) 28' (yellow-red card); Hanson 84'	Stadium: Brisbane Road; Attendance: 1,356; Referee: Abigail Byrne

11 December 2025 3	Aston Villa	3–0	Liverpool	Aston
19:00 GMT	Daly 1', 77'; Patten (yellow card) 25'; Hanson 28'; Kearns (yellow card) 69'	Report	Parry (yellow card) 60'; Woodham (yellow card) 69'	Stadium: Villa Park; Attendance: 3,210; Referee: Adewunmi Soneye
Note: This fixture was initially scheduled for a 14:00 kick-off on 21 September, but was moved to 12:00 for live Sky Sports broadcast, and later postponed due to the passing of former Liverpool manager Matt Beard.

14 December 2025 11	Manchester City	6–1	Aston Villa	Manchester
12:00	Shaw 37', 45+2', 84', 90+4'; Knaak (yellow card) 56'; Fujino 62'; Miedema 73'	Report	Parker 70'	Stadium: Academy Stadium; Attendance: 2,711; Referee: Kirsty Dowle

11 January 2026 12	Aston Villa	2–1	Brighton & Hove Albion	Aston
12:00	Patten (yellow card) 33'; Daly 57'; Hanson 58'; Kendall (yellow card) 77'	Report	Tsunoda 11'; Kafaji (yellow card) 56'	Stadium: Villa Park; Attendance: 2,361; Referee: Megan Wilson

25 January 2026 13	Aston Villa	1–4	Manchester United	Aston
11:55	Taylor (yellow card) 17'; Hanson 37'; Deslandes (yellow card) 55'	Report	Zigiotti 35'; Terland 71'; Park 75'; Lundkvist 79'	Stadium: Villa Park; Attendance: 4,501; Referee: Stacey Pearson

1 February 2026 14	Everton	2–1	Aston Villa	Liverpool
11:55	Mace (yellow card) 16'; Fernández 32', 89'; Brosnan (yellow card) 45'	Report	Salmon 13'; Patten (yellow card) 30'	Stadium: Goodison Park; Attendance: 2,131; Referee: Stacey Fullicks

8 February 2026 15	Liverpool	4–1	Aston Villa	St Helens
12:00	Enderby 9'; Thomas 14'; O'Sullivan (yellow card) 72'; Fisk 83'; Csillag 90+7'	Report	Parker (yellow card) 38'; Taylor 41'; Grant (yellow card) 90+6'	Stadium: Totally Wicked Stadium; Attendance: 2,587; Referee: Megan Wilson

15 February 2026 16	Aston Villa	3–7	Tottenham Hotspur	Aston
12:00	Hanson 16', 80'; Staniforth (yellow card) 34'; Jean-François 68'	Report	Gaupset 10'; England 19'; Holdt 26'; A. Nildén (yellow card) 45+4'; Tandberg 69', 82'; Hamano 72'; Blakstad 85'; Hunt (yellow card) 90+5'	Stadium: Villa Park; Attendance: 2,563; Referee: Kirsty Dowle

15 March 2026 17	Aston Villa	0–0	Manchester City	Aston
11:55	Wilms (yellow card) 88'	Report	Greenwood (yellow card) 22'; Casparij (yellow card) 57'	Stadium: Villa Park; Attendance: 3,388; Referee: Phoebe Cross

22 March 2026 18	Leicester City	1–2	Aston Villa	Leicester
14:45	Lehmann 38'; Ale (yellow card) 45'; Neville (yellow card) 77'	Report	Taylor (yellow card) 28'; Patten 47'; Hanson 84'	Stadium: King Power Stadium; Attendance: 2,627; Referee: Stacey Pearson

29 March 2026 19	Chelsea	4–3	Aston Villa	Kingston upon Thames
12:00	Kerr 20'; Girma 23'; James 27'; Nüsken 82'	Report	Grant 2'; Hanson 31', 35'; Nighswonger (yellow card) 90+6'	Stadium: Kingsmeadow; Attendance: 3,470; Referee: Callum Jones

4 May 2026 21	Aston Villa	0–2	West Ham United	Aston
13:00	Hijikata (yellow card) 16'	Report	Wandeler (yellow card) 34'; Cascarino (yellow card) 49'; Ueki 86'; Piubel 90+2'	Stadium: Villa Park; Attendance: 3,417; Referee: Lisa Benn

9 May 2026 20	Aston Villa	0–3	Arsenal	Aston
12:00		Report	Russo 4', 52'; Maanum 35'	Stadium: Villa Park; Attendance: 7,944; Referee: Melissa Burgin
Note: This fixture, originally scheduled for 26 April 2026, was postponed due to Arsenal's participation in the 2025–26 UEFA Women's Champions League knockout phase

16 May 2026 22	London City Lionesses	2–1	Aston Villa	Bromley
13:00	Van de Donk 73'; Godfrey 90+3'	Report	Wilms 45+2', (yellow card) 90+1'; Taylor (yellow card) 61'	Stadium: Hayes Lane; Attendance: 2,982; Referee: William Davis

=== League table ===
Pos	Team	Pld	W	D	L	GF	GA	GD	Pts
7	Brighton & Hove Albion	22	7	5	10	27	28	−1	26
8	Everton	22	7	2	13	25	37	−12	23
9	Aston Villa	22	5	5	12	28	48	−20	20
10	West Ham United	22	5	4	13	20	45	−25	19
11	Liverpool	22	4	5	13	21	34	−13	17

Source: WSL League Table
Rules for classification: 1) Points; 2) Goal difference; 3) Number of goals scored.

== Women's FA Cup ==
As a member of the first tier, Aston Villa entered the FA Cup in the fourth round proper.

18 January 2026 Fourth round	Arsenal	2–0	Aston Villa	Borehamwood
14:00	Blackstenius 52'; Little 62'	Report	Jean-François (yellow card) 64'; Parker (yellow card) 90+2'	Stadium: Meadow Park; Attendance: 2,722; Referee: Lisa Benn

== FA Women's League Cup ==
24 September 2025 Group stage	Tottenham Hotspur	0–0 (7–6 p)	Aston Villa	Leyton
19:00 BST		Report		Stadium: Brisbane Road; Attendance: 664; Referee: Phoebe Cross
	Penalties
	Gunning-Williams (penalty missed); England (penalty scored); Nildén (penalty scored); Vinberg (penalty scored); Summanen (penalty scored); Spence (penalty scored); Kop (penalty scored); Koga (penalty scored)		(penalty scored) Mayling; (penalty scored) Patten; (penalty scored) Baijings; (penalty missed) Taylor; (penalty scored) Deslandes; (penalty scored) Wilms; (penalty scored) Kendall; (penalty missed) Mullett

19 October 2025 Group stage	Bristol City	0–3	Aston Villa	Failand
15:00		Report	Daly 3'; Mullett 28'; Salmon 86' (pen.)	Stadium: Robins HPC; Referee: Phoebe Cross

21 November 2025 Group stage	Aston Villa	3–3 (2–4 p)	Birmingham City	Walsall
14:00	Taylor (yellow card) 36'; Wilms (red card); Patten 64'; Kendall 77'; Maltby 90'	Report	Herron (yellow card) 39'; Hurtré (yellow card) 45'; Sarri 28', 58'; Louis 90+1'	Stadium: Bescot Stadium; Attendance: 1,513; Referee: Sophie Dennington
	Penalties
	(penalty missed) Mayling; (penalty scored) Patten; (penalty scored) Kearns; (penalty missed) Kendall		(penalty scored) Harrison-Murray; (penalty scored) Harris; (penalty scored) Sarri; (penalty scored) Quinn

Pos	Team	Pld	W	PW	PL	L	GF	GA	GD	Pts	Qualification
1	Tottenham Hotspur	3	2	1	0	0	4	0	+4	8	Advanced to knockout stage
2	Aston Villa	3	1	0	2	0	6	3	+3	5	
3	Birmingham City	3	0	2	0	1	5	8	−3	4	
4	Bristol City	3	0	0	1	2	2	6	−4	1	

Source: Women's League Cup
Rules for classification: 1) Points; 2) Goal difference; 3) Number of goals scored; 4) Number of wins; 5) Head-to-head record

== Squad statistics ==
=== Appearances ===
As of match played 16 May 2026

Starting appearances are listed first, followed by substitute appearances after the + symbol where applicable.

No.	Pos	Nat	Player	Total		WSL		FA Cup		League Cup	
No.	Pos	Nat	Player	Apps	Goals	Apps	Goals	Apps	Goals	Apps	Goals
1	GK	(Canada) CAN	Sabrina D'Angelo	16	0	15+1	0	0	0	0	0
4	DF	(Republic of Ireland) IRL	Anna Patten	23	2	19	1	1	0	3	1
5	MF	(England) ENG	Lucy Staniforth	11	0	2+8	0	1	0	0	0
6	MF	(France) FRA	Oriane Jean-François	11	1	9+1	1	0+1	0	0	0
7	MF	(England) ENG	Missy Bo Kearns	15	0	8+3	0	1	0	2+1	0
8	MF	(Netherlands) NED	Jill Baijings	4	0	3	0	0	0	1	0
9	FW	(England) ENG	Rachel Daly	18	4	11+4	3	0	0	3	1
10	FW	(Brazil) BRA	Gabi Nunes	2	0	0+2	0	0	0	0	0
13	FW	(Japan) JPN	Maya Hijikata	13	0	10+2	0	1	0	0	0
14	DF	(Netherlands) NED	Lynn Wilms	21	2	17	2	1	0	2+1	0
15	DF	(England) ENG	Lucy Parker	11	2	8+1	2	1	0	1	0
16	DF	(Switzerland) SUI	Noelle Maritz	22	0	17+1	0	1	0	3	0
17	FW	(England) ENG	Ebony Salmon	25	3	10+11	2	0+1	0	2+1	1
18	FW	(England) ENG	Georgia Mullett	20	2	6+10	1	0+1	0	2+1	1
20	FW	(Scotland) SCO	Kirsty Hanson	26	12	20+2	12	1	0	0+3	0
21	MF	(England) ENG	Lucia Kendall	21	1	16+2	0	0	0	2+1	1
23	FW	(Netherlands) NED	Chasity Grant	19	1	14+2	1	0	0	2+1	0
24	DF	(France) FRA	Océane Deslandes	21	0	16+2	0	0+1	0	1+1	0
25	MF	(Scotland) SCO	Miri Taylor	25	2	17+4	2	1	0	2+1	0
26	GK	(England) ENG	Ellie Roebuck	13	0	7+2	0	1	0	3	0
32	DF	(United States) USA	Jenna Nighswonger	8	0	5+3	0	0	0	0	0
38	DF	(England) ENG	Rachel Maltby	20	1	11+5	0	1	0	2+1	1
42	GK	(England) ENG	Lily Clark	0	0	0	0	0	0	0	0
43	DF	(England) ENG	Katie Scott	0	0	0	0	0	0	0	0
45	FW	(England) ENG	Milly Round	1	0	0+1	0	0	0	0	0
Players away from the club on loan:
2	DF	(England) ENG	Sarah Mayling	11	0	1+7	0	0	0	2+1	0
22	DF	(England) ENG	Lydia Sallaway	1	0	0	0	0	0	0+1	0
Players who appeared for the club but left during the season:
3	DF	(Spain) ESP	Paula Tomás	5	0	0+5	0	0	0	0	0
