= Chasity Grant =

Dutch association football player

- Grant in 2026

Personal information
- Full name: Chasity Shivonia Charissa Grant
- Date of birth: 19 April 2001 (age 25)
- Place of birth: Schiedam, Netherlands
- Positions: Right winger; right wing-back

Team information
- Current team: Aston Villa
- Number: 17

Youth career
- SC Spaland
- VV Zwaluwen
- ADO Den Haag

Senior career*
Years	Team	Apps	(Gls)
2017–2020	ADO Den Haag	19	(11)
2020–2024	Ajax	81	(22)
2024–	Aston Villa	48	(7)

International career^{‡}
2016	Netherlands U16	6	(1)
2017–2018	Netherlands U17	9	(2)
2018–2020	Netherlands U19	24	(7)
2021–2024	Netherlands U23	9	(1)
2022–	Netherlands	26	(2)
- * Club domestic league appearances and goals as of 22 November 2026 ‡ National team caps and goals as of 18 April 2026

Chasity Shivonia Charissa Grant (Dutch: [ˈʃaː.sɪ.ti ˈʃi.voː.ni.aː ʃaːˈrɪ.saː ɣrɛnt]; born 19 April 2001) is a Dutch professional footballer who plays as a right winger or right wing-back for Women's Super League club Aston Villa and the Netherlands national team.

== Club career ==
=== ADO Den Haag ===
Grant played youth football for SC Spaland and VV Zwaluwen before joining ADO Den Haag. She made her league debut against Ajax on 22 September 2017. Grant scored her first league goal against Heerenveen on 13 October 2017, scoring in the 90th minute.

=== Ajax ===
On 27 May 2020, it was announced that Grant had signed with Ajax. She made her league debut against Twente on 6 September 2020. She scored her first league goal against PEC Zwolle on 30 October 2020, scoring in the 32nd minute. On 22 June 2023, it was announced that Grant had signed a new two-year deal. Along with Sonya Verhoeve, she played her 100th match for Ajax against AZ. Grant made her UEFA Women's Champions League debut in November 2023. She was voted Player of the Match in the 2024 KNVB Women's Cup final.

=== Aston Villa ===
On 8 August 2024, Grant joined Women's Super League club Aston Villa on a three-year contract. On 30 January 2026, it was announced that she had signed a new contract with Aston Villa, having won the club's Players’ Player of the Season award for 2024–25.

== International career ==
Grant made her senior team debut for Netherlands on 19 February 2022 in a 3–0 win against Finland.

In May 2024, Grant was called up for the European Championship qualifying matches in May and June 2024.

== Personal life ==
Born in the Netherlands, Grant is of Surinamese descent.

== Career statistics ==
As of match played 22 November 2026

Appearances and goals by club, season and competition
Club	Season	League			National Cup		League Cup		Continental		Other		Total	
Club	Season	Division	Apps	Goals	Apps	Goals	Apps	Goals	Apps	Goals	Apps	Goals	Apps	Goals
ADO Den Haag	2017–18	Vrouwen Eredivisie	2	2	0	0	–		–		–		2	2
ADO Den Haag	2018–19	Vrouwen Eredivisie	5	5	0	0	–		–		–		5	5
ADO Den Haag	2019–20	Vrouwen Eredivisie	12	4	0	0	–		–				12	4
ADO Den Haag	Total		19	11	0	0	0	0	0	0	0	0	19	11
Ajax	2020–21	Vrouwen Eredivisie	19	3	2	0	–		2 (Note: Appearances in UEFA Women's Champions League)	0	–		23	3
Ajax	2022–23	Vrouwen Eredivisie	24	10	3	3	–		4	2	1 (Note: Appearance in Dutch Women's Super Cup)	0	32	15
Ajax	2023–24	Vrouwen Eredivisie	20	3	4	0	–		11	3	1	0	39	6
Ajax	2024–25	Vrouwen Eredivisie	18	6	0	0	–		0	0	0	0	18	6
Ajax	Total		81	22	9	3	0	0	17	5	2	0	109	30
Aston Villa	2024–25	Women's Super League	21	4	3	2	1	0	–		–		25	6
Aston Villa	2025–26	Women's Super League	16	1	0	0	3	0	–		–		19	1
Aston Villa	2026–27	Women's Super League	11	2	0	0	3	1	–		–		14	3
Aston Villa	Total		48	7	3	2	9	1	0	0	0	0	58	10
Career total			148	40	12	5	9	1	17	5	2	0	176	51

=== International ===
As of match played 18 April 2026

Appearances and goals by national team and year
National team	Year	Apps	Goals
Netherlands	2022	1	0
Netherlands	2024	9	0
Netherlands	2025	12	2
Netherlands	2026	4	0
Total		26	2

Scores and results list Netherlands' goal tally first, score column indicates score after each Grant goal.

List of international goals scored by Chasity Grant
No.	Date	Venue	Opponent	Score	Result	Competition
1	25 February 2025	Hampden Park, Glasgow, Scotland	Scotland	2–1	2–1	2025 UEFA Women's Nations League
2	28 November 2025	Estádio Municipal de Braga, Braga, Portugal	Portugal	1–0	2–1	Friendly

== Honours ==
Ajax

- KNVB Women's Cup: 2021–22, 2023–2024
- Eredivisie Cup: 2020–21
- Eredivisie: 2022–23
