= Océane Deslandes =

French footballer (born 2000)

- Deslandes in 2026

Personal information
- Full name: Océane Clemence Deslandes
- Date of birth: 26 July 2000 (age 26)
- Place of birth: Laval, France
- Height: 1.69 m (5 ft 7 in)
- Position: Defender

Team information
- Current team: Aston Villa
- Number: 24

Youth career
- 2006–2012: AS Vaiges
- 2012–2015: FA de la Bonne Lorraine

Senior career*
Years	Team	Apps	(Gls)
2015–2018	Le Mans	50	(3)
2018–2022	Reims	64	(2)
2022–2025	Montpellier	61	(5)
2025–	Aston Villa	28	(0)

International career
2016	France U16	9	(0)
2016–2017	France U17	9	(0)
2018–2019	France U19	7	(0)
2019–2020	France U20	3	(0)
2021–2023	France U23	9	(0)
- * Club domestic league appearances and goals as of 15 November 2026

Océane Clemence Deslandes (French: [ɔ.se.an de.lɑ̃d]; born 26 July 2000) is a French professional footballer who plays as a defender for Women's Super League club Aston Villa.

== Club career ==
Deslandes was at Le Mans from 2015 to 2018.

Deslandes played in Stade de Reims from 2018 to 2022 with 64 matches with 2 goals.

Deslandes arrived in the summer of 2022 where she played 66 games and scored 4 goals in three seasons at Montpellier HSC.

Deslandes joined English club Aston Villa after not renewing her contract with Montpellier HSC in June 2025.

== International career ==
Deslandes played in France women's national under-16 football team with 9 matches, in France women's national under-17 football team with 9 marches and 2 goals, in France women's national under-19 football team with 7 matches, in France women's national under-20 football team with 3 matches and joined France women's national football team with 2 matches.

== Career statistics ==
As of match played 15 November 2026

Appearances and goals by club, season and competition
Club	Season	League			National Cup		League Cup		Other		Total	
Club	Season	Division	Apps	Goals	Apps	Goals	Apps	Goals	Apps	Goals	Apps	Goals
Le Mans	2015–18	Division 1 Féminine	Stats not available									
Reims	2019–20	Division 1 Féminine	8	0	0	0	–		–		8	0
Reims	2020–21	Division 1 Féminine	21	0	1	0	–		–		22	0
Reims	2021–22	Division 1 Féminine	22	2	2	0	–				25	2
Reims	Total		51	2	3	0	0	0	0	0	55	2
Montpellier	2022–23	Division 1 Féminine	21	1	2	1	–		–		23	2
Montpellier	2023–24	Division 1 Féminine	19	1	0	0	–		–		19	1
Montpellier	2024–25	Première Ligue	21	1	1	0			–		22	1
Montpellier	Total		61	3	3	1	0	0	0	0	64	4
Aston Villa	2025–26	Women's Super League	18	0	1	0	2	0	–		21	0
Aston Villa	2026–27	Women's Super League	10	0	0	0	5	0	–		15	0
Aston Villa	Total		28	0	1	0	7	0	0	0	36	0
Career total			140	5	7	1	7	0	0	0	154	6
