= Kamilla Melgård =

Norwegian footballer (born 2005)

Personal information
- Date of birth: 16 December 2005 (age 20)
- Place of birth: Norway
- Height: 1.63 m (5 ft 4 in)
- Position: Midfielder

Team information
- Current team: Aston Villa
- Number: 11

Youth career
- Korsvoll IL
- Lyn

Senior career*
Years	Team	Apps	(Gls)
2021	Lyn 2	2	(4)
2021–2024	Lyn	75	(11)
2024–2026	Madrid CFF	48	(8)
2026–	Aston Villa	0	(0)

International career^{‡}
2021	Norway U16	7	(1)
2022	Norway U17	11	(1)
2022–2024	Norway U19	16	(3)
2024–	Norway U23	7	(1)
- * Club domestic league appearances and goals as of 26 October 2026 ‡ National team caps and goals as of 26 October 2026

Kamilla Melgård (born 16 December 2005) is a Norwegian professional footballer who plays as a midfielder for Women's Super League club Aston Villa.

== Club career ==
Melgård started her career at Lyn before joining Liga F club Madrid CFF in 2024. On 30 June 2026, she signed for Women's Super League side Aston Villa.

== International career ==
Melgård has represented Norway at youth level.

== Career statistics ==
=== Club ===
As of match played 31 May 2026

Appearances and goals by club, season and competition
Club	Season	League			National cup		League cup		Europe		Total	
Club	Season	Division	Apps	Goals	Apps	Goals	Apps	Goals	Apps	Goals	Apps	Goals
Lyn	2021	Toppserien	12	0	0	0	—		—		12	0
Lyn	2022	Toppserien	23	5	1	0	—		—		24	5
Lyn	2023	Toppserien	26	5	2	2	—		—		28	7
Lyn	2024	Toppserien	14	1	0	0	—		—		14	1
Lyn	Total		75	11	3	2	0	0	0	0	78	13
Madrid CFF	2024–25	Liga F	18	4	2	0	—		—		20	4
Madrid CFF	2025–26	Liga F	30	4	3	0	—		—		33	4
Madrid CFF	Total		48	8	5	0	0	0	0	0	53	8
Aston Villa	2026–27	Women's Super League	0	0	0	0	0	0	—		0	0
Career total			123	19	8	2	0	0	0	0	131	21
