= Maya Hijikata =

Japanese footballer (born 2004)

Maya Hijikata 土方 麻椰
- Hijikata in 2026

Personal information
- Date of birth: April 13, 2004 (age 22)
- Place of birth: Niiza, Saitama, Japan
- Height: 1.65 m (5 ft 5 in)
- Position: Striker

Team information
- Current team: Aston Villa
- Number: 13

Youth career
- 2020–2022: NTV Tokyo Verdy Menina

Senior career*
Years	Team	Apps	(Gls)
2021–2025	NTV Tokyo Verdy Beleza	49	(14)
2025–	Aston Villa	19	(0)

International career^{‡}
2022–2024	Japan U-20	15	(10)
2023–	Japan	6	(1)
Medal record
Women's football
Representing Japan
AFC Women's Asian Cup
Winner	2026 Australia
Asian Games
Gold medal – first place	2022 Hangzhou	Women's tournament
FIFA U-20 Women's World Cup
Runner-up	2024 Colombia
AFC U-20 Women's Asian Cup
Runner-up	2024 Uzbekistan
- * Club domestic league appearances and goals as of 14:25, 1 November 2026 (UTC) ‡ National team caps and goals as of 10:43, 24 September 2026 (UTC)

Maya Hijikata (土方 麻椰, Hijikata Maya; born April 13, 2004) is a Japanese professional footballer who plays as a striker for the Women's Super League club Aston Villa and the Japan national team.

== Club career ==
In 2023, Hijikata was promoted from Nippon TV Tokyo Verdy Menina to Nippon TV Tokyo Verdy Beleza.

On 22 August 2025, it was announced Hijikata had signed for English side Aston Villa.

== International career ==
In July 2022, Hijikata was selected for the Japanese U-20 national team for the U-20 Women's World Cup. She played in five matches at the tournament, contributing to Japan's runner-up finish.

In August 2023, Hijikata was selected for the senior Japanese national team for the Asian Games. She played in five matches at the tournament, scoring two goals and contributing to Japan's victory.

Hijikata was selected for the national team for the 2024 AFC U-20 Women's Asian Cup held in Uzbekistan in February 2024 and was also selected for the national team for the 2024 FIFA U-20 Women's World Cup in September of the same year.

== Career statistics ==
=== Club ===
As of match played 11 November 2026

Appearances and goals by club, season and competition
Club	Season	League			National cup (Note: Includes Empress's Cup, Women's FA Cup)		League cup (Note: Includes WE League Cup, Women's League Cup, WSL Players Cup)		Total	
Club	Season	Division	Apps	Goals	Apps	Goals	Apps	Goals	Apps	Goals
Tokyo Verdy Beleza	2021–22	WE League	2	0	0	0	0	0	2	0
Tokyo Verdy Beleza	2022–23	WE League	11	2	0	0	0	0	11	2
Tokyo Verdy Beleza	2023–24	WE League	17	5	2	0	4	1	23	6
Tokyo Verdy Beleza	2024–25	WE League	19	7	3	0	2	0	24	7
Tokyo Verdy Beleza	Total		48	14	5	0	6	1	59	15
Aston Villa	2025–26	Women's Super League	12	0	1	0	0	0	13	0
Aston Villa	2026–27	Women's Super League	7	0	0	0	5	1	12	1
Aston Villa	Total		19	0	1	0	5	1	25	1
Career total			67	14	6	0	11	2	84	16

=== International ===
As of match played 18 April 2026

Appearances and goals by national team and year
National team	Year	Apps	Goals
Japan	2026	6	1
Total		6	1

Scores and results list Japan's goal tally first, score column indicates score after each Hijikata goal.

List of international goals scored by Maya Hijikata
No.	Date	Venue	Opponent	Score	Result	Competition
1	7 March 2026	Perth Rectangular Stadium, Perth, Australia	India	9–0	11–0	2026 AFC Women's Asian Cup
2	9 October 2026	Stade Bauer, Saint-Ouen-sur-Seine, France	Haiti	5–1	5–1	Friendly

== Honours ==
Tokyo Verdy Beleza

- WE League: 2024–25

Japan

- AFC Women's Asian Cup: 2026
- Asian Games: 2022

Japan U-20

- AFC U-20 Women's Asian Cup runner-up: 2024

Individual

- AFC U-20 Women's Asian Cup Top Scorer: 2024
