= Lucia Kendall =

English footballer (born 2004)

- Kendall in 2026

Personal information
- Full name: Lucia Charlotte Kendall
- Date of birth: 20 May 2004 (age 22)
- Place of birth: Winchester, Hampshire, England
- Height: 1.70 m (5 ft 7 in)
- Position: Midfielder

Team information
- Current team: Aston Villa
- Number: 21

Youth career
- Winchester City Flyers
- Southampton

Senior career*
Years	Team	Apps	(Gls)
2020–2025	Southampton	77	(22)
2025–	Aston Villa	26	(0)

International career^{‡}
2019	England U15	2	(0)
- England U18
2021–2023	England U19	10	(3)
2023–	England U23	6	(1)
2025–	England	7	(1)
- * Club domestic league appearances and goals as of 19:56, 8 November 2026 (UTC) ‡ National team caps and goals as of 09:50, 10 June 2026 (UTC)

Lucia Charlotte Kendall (born 20 May 2004) is an English professional footballer who plays as a midfielder for Women's Super League club Aston Villa, and the England national team. Kendall previously played for Southampton where she made over 100 appearances and won the National League Cup and National League South with the team, after winning the Division One South West the previous season.

== Early life ==
Kendall was born in Winchester and educated at Twyford School and St Swithun's School. Her father is former Hampshire cricketer, Will Kendall. She has a younger sister and brother. She started her youth career aged 7 with Winchester City Flyers, before joining Southampton's Regional Talent Club, and graduating from Southampton's academy. As a cricketer, Kendall represented Hampshire Women, and was selected for the England Women's Academy in the 2019–20 season.

== Club career ==
=== Southampton ===
On 20 April 2022, Kendall scored the second goal against Portsmouth for a 2–0 victory to secure the National League title, in front of a record attendance for the team of 5,145. One week later, she scored two goals in the National League Cup Final against Huddersfield Town, helping the Saints to win the National League Cup, and seal a non-league double. During the 2021–22 National League South season, Kendall scored 22 goals in 27 appearances. On 21 May 2022, in the National League Championship play-off, that Southampton won 1–0 thus gaining promotion to the Women's Championship, Kendall's performance was described by The Observer as "dictating the play from the middle", while displaying football intelligence beyond her years.

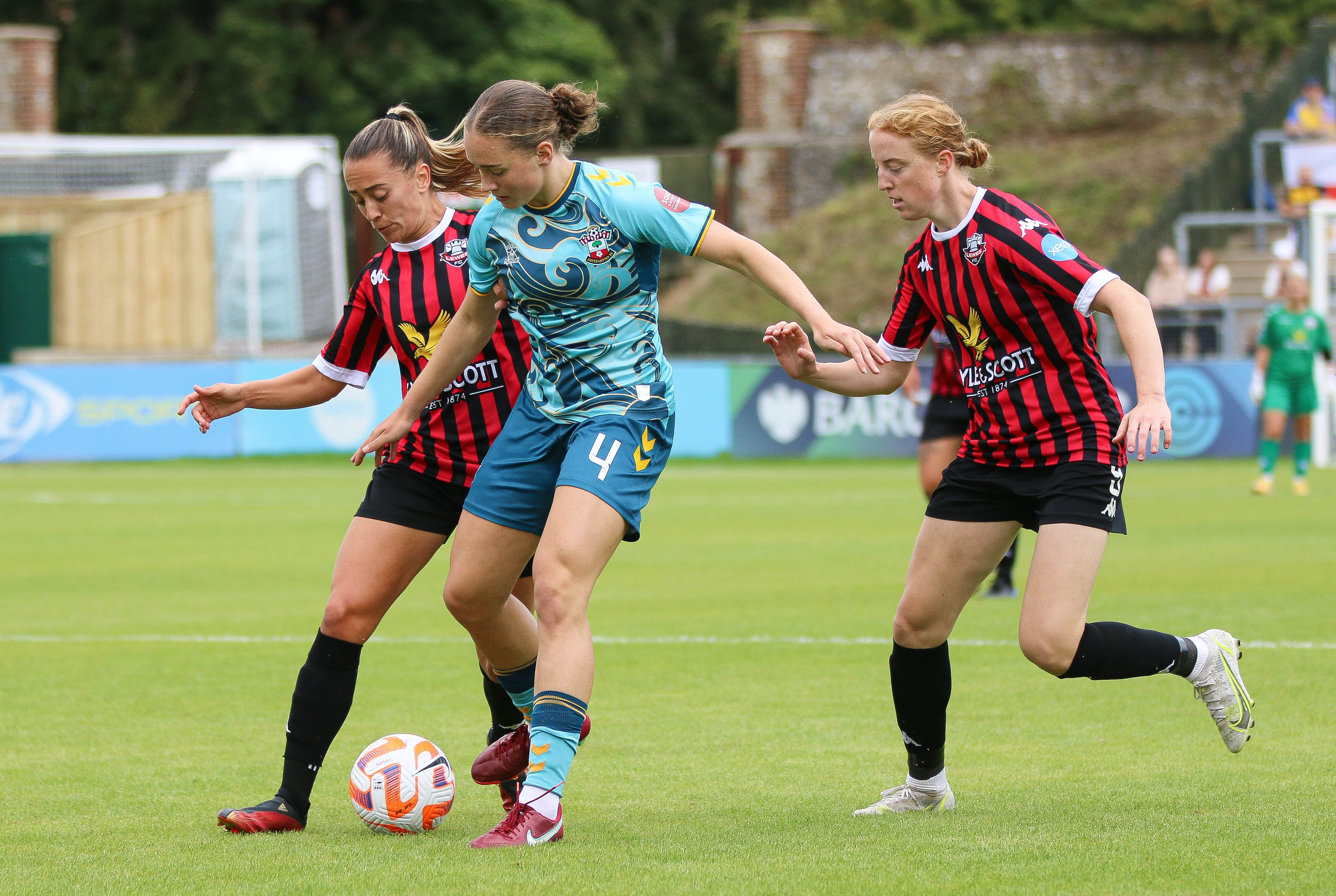
Kendall (centre) playing for Southampton against Lewes in 2022.

On 17 October 2022, as a substitute, she scored her first Championship goal for Southampton, the winning goal, against Birmingham City for a 1–0 victory in the 2022–23 season. In June 2023, Kendall signed a contract extension with Southampton to remain until 2025.

On 11 February 2024, in a 3–1 defeat to Manchester United in the fifth round of the 2023–24 FA Cup, she provided the assist to equalise in the match. In November 2024, Kendall made her 100th senior appearance for Southampton.

=== Aston Villa ===
On 23 July 2025, Women's Super League club Aston Villa announced the signing of Kendall, following the expiry of her Southampton contract.

== International career ==
=== Youth ===
Kendall has represented England at under-15, under-17, under-18, under-19 and under-23 youth levels. In October 2021, Kendall was called to the England under-19 team for 2022 U-19 Championship qualification fixtures, playing in matches against the Republic of Ireland and Switzerland. On 9 November 2022, Kendall scored both goals in the 2–1 win against Norway in the Algarve Cup.

In October 2023, Kendall was named as part of the England under-23 squad for fixtures in the U23 European League. She went on to feature in the 1–1 draw against Italy, followed by the 2–0 victory over Portugal, alongside Saints teammate midfielder Molly Pike.

On 2 December 2024, in the U23 European League competition, Kendall scored her debut goal for the under-23s in a 2–1 defeat to Sweden.

=== Senior ===
On 14 October 2025, Kendall received her first senior England call-up as part of England's 'Homecoming' series. She made her full senior debut in the match against Australia on 28 October 2025 in a 3–0 victory, and was named Player of the Match. Kendall scored her first goal for the senior team on 2 December in a 2–0 friendly victory over Ghana.

== Career statistics ==
=== Club ===
As of match played 11 November 2026

Appearances and goals by club, season and competition
Club	Season	League			National cup (Note: Includes Women's FA Cup)		League cup (Note: Includes FA Women's League Cup)		Total	
Club	Season	Division	Apps	Goals	Apps	Goals	Apps	Goals	Apps	Goals
Southampton	2020–21	FA Women's National League Division One South West	3	2	1	0	0	0	4	2
Southampton	2021–22	FA Women's National League Premier Division South	19	16	2	1	3	4	24	21
Southampton	2022–23	FA Women's Championship	20	1	0	0	1	0	21	1
Southampton	2023–24	FA Women's Championship	22	1	2	0	4	0	28	1
Southampton	2024–25	FA Women's Championship	13	2	0	0	2	0	15	2
Southampton	Total		77	22	5	1	10	4	92	27
Aston Villa	2025–26	Women's Super League	18	0	0	0	3	1	21	1
Aston Villa	2026–27	Women's Super League	8	0	0	0	4	2	12	2
Aston Villa	Total		26	0	0	0	7	3	33	3
Career total			103	22	5	1	17	7	125	30

=== International ===
As of match played 9 June 2026

Appearances and goals by national team and year
National team	Year	Apps	Goals
England	2025	3	1
England	2026	4	0
Total		7	1

Scores and results list England's goal tally first, score column indicates score after each Kendall goal.

List of international goals scored by Lucia Kendall
No.	Date	Venue	Opponent	Score	Result	Competition	Ref.
1	2 December 2025	St Mary's Stadium, Southampton, England	Ghana	1–0	2–0	Friendly	

== Personal life ==
As of October 2025, Kendall was studying for a degree in psychology.

== Honours ==
Southampton

- National League Division One South West: 2020–21
- National League South: 2021–22
- National League Cup: 2021–22
