= Miri Taylor =

Scottish footballer (born 2000)

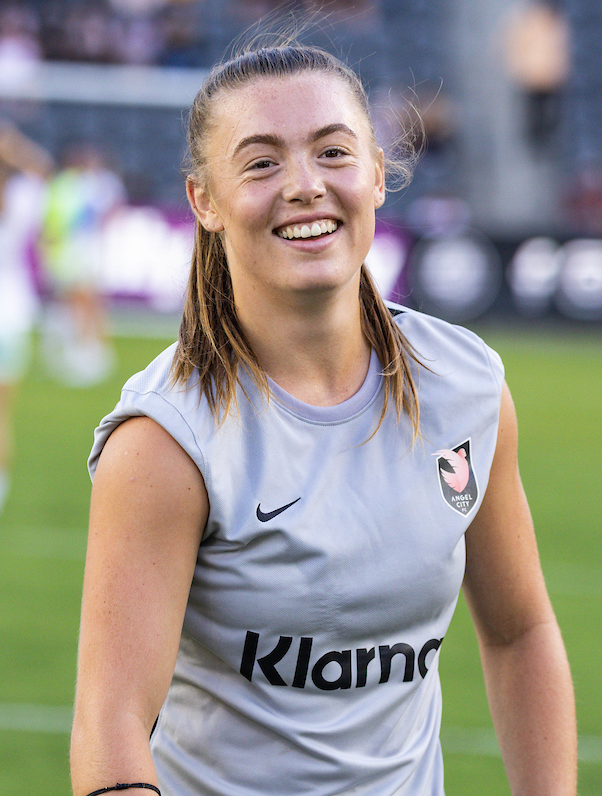
- Taylor with Angel City in 2022

Personal information
- Full name: Miriaél Géanne Taylor
- Date of birth: 2 February 2000 (age 26)
- Place of birth: Gillingham, Kent, England
- Height: 5 ft 7 in (1.70 m)
- Position: Midfielder

Team information
- Current team: Aston Villa
- Number: 25

Youth career
- 2008–2009: Gillingham
- 2009–2011: Charlton Athletic
- 2011–2018: Soccer Elite Football Academy
- 2012–2017: Chelsea
- 2017–2018: Arsenal

College career
Years	Team	Apps	(Gls)
2018–2021	Hofstra Pride	69	(33)

Senior career*
Years	Team	Apps	(Gls)
2016	Chelsea	2	(0)
2022	Angel City	11	(0)
2023–2024	Liverpool	12	(1)
2024	→ Aston Villa (loan)	8	(0)
2024–	Aston Villa	43	(2)

International career^{‡}
2016–2017	England U17	2	(1)
2025–	Scotland	9	(0)
- * Club domestic league appearances and goals as of 22 November 2026 ‡ National team caps and goals as of 15 October 2026

Miriaél Géanne Taylor (born 2 February 2000) is a professional footballer who plays as a midfielder for Women's Super League club Aston Villa. Born in England, she plays for the Scotland national team.

== Early life ==
Taylor was born in Gillingham, Kent. An only child, she began playing football with a local boys' club. She started with Chelsea's youth team at age 12, moving up to the reserves and eventually the first team.

== College career ==
Taylor attended Hofstra University, earning a degree in rhetoric and public advocacy. In her sophomore year, in 2019, she started all 22 matches and scored nine goals, of which five were game winners. Taylor also started every game in the 2020 season, but the COVID-19 pandemic meant the team played only nine, in the spring of 2021. Her senior year, she started 21 matches, recording 17 goals, tied for second-most in program history, and 11 assists. Her 31 career assists were a program record. In 2021, she was a United Soccer Coaches first-team All American and a MAC Hermann semi-finalist.

== Club career ==
=== Chelsea ===
After having played with the club's youth and reserves sides, Taylor moved up to the first team at age 16. She made her first appearance against Doncaster Rovers Belles, coming on for Karen Carney in the 82nd minute.

=== Arsenal ===
Taylor moved to Arsenal for one season before attending college in the United States.

=== Angel City ===
Angel City selected Taylor in the fourth round of the 2022 NWSL Draft, 39th overall. She made her first appearance on 15 May 2022, against the Washington Spirit. She got her first start on 11 June 2022, against Racing Louisville FC. Taylor played a total of 342 minutes in 11 matches in her first season. She played at right wing, center forward, and central midfielder at different times over the course of the season.

=== Liverpool ===
In January 2023, Taylor returned to England, signing with Women's Super League club Liverpool. She spent the second half of the 2023–24 season on loan with Aston Villa, and departed Liverpool at the end of her contract.

=== Aston Villa ===
On 23 July 2024, Taylor signed for Aston Villa on a two-year contract with the option for a further year.

== International career ==
Taylor is a former youth international for England. On 13 October 2025, her request to switch international allegiance to Scotland was approved by FIFA.

== Personal life ==
Taylor married her partner Samantha Lord in June 2026.

== Career statistics ==
=== Club ===
As of match played 22 November 2026

Appearances and goals by club, season and competition
Club	Season	League			National cup (Note: Includes Women's FA Cup)		League cup (Note: Includes NWSL Challenge Cup, FA Women's League Cup)		Total	
Club	Season	Division	Apps	Goals	Apps	Goals	Apps	Goals	Apps	Goals
Chelsea	2016	Women's Super League	2	0	0	0	0	0	2	0
Angel City	2022	NWSL	11	0	—		2	0	13	0
Liverpool	2022–23	Women's Super League	9	0	0	0	0	0	9	0
Liverpool	2023–24	Women's Super League	3	1	0	0	3	0	6	1
Liverpool	Total		12	1	0	0	3	0	15	1
Aston Villa (loan)	2023–24	Women's Super League	8	0	0	0	0	0	8	0
Aston Villa	2024–25	Women's Super League	11	0	3	0	3	0	17	0
Aston Villa	2025–26	Women's Super League	21	2	1	0	3	0	25	2
Aston Villa	2026–27	Women's Super League	11	0	0	0	5	0	16	0
Aston Villa	Total		51	2	4	0	11	0	66	2
Career total			76	3	4	0	16	0	96	3

== Honours ==
=== College ===
- MAC Hermann semi-finalist: 2021
- United Soccer Coaches All-America First Team: 2021
- CAA Attacking Player of the Year: 2021
