= Georgia Mullett =

English footballer (born 2005)

- Mullett in 2026

Personal information
- Date of birth: 16 September 2005 (age 21)
- Place of birth: England
- Position: Forward

Team information
- Current team: Aston Villa
- Number: 18

Youth career
- –2023: Aston Villa

Senior career*
Years	Team	Apps	(Gls)
2022–	Aston Villa	32	(1)
2025	→ Southampton (loan)	9	(1)

International career^{‡}
2022–2024	England U19	11	(2)
2025–	England U23	2	(0)
- * Club domestic league appearances and goals as of 18:54, 22 November 2026 (UTC) ‡ National team caps and goals as of 12:06, 13 November 2025 (UTC)

Georgia Mullett (born 16 September 2005) is an English professional footballer who plays as a forward for Women's Super League club Aston Villa, and the England under-23s. Mullet has represented England since under-19 youth level.

== Youth career ==
A product of the Aston Villa Academy, Mullett scored 19 goals in 19 games for the under-21 team during the 2022–23 WSL Academy League season, with an additional 2 goals in 2 cup matches.

== Club career ==
=== Aston Villa ===
On 20 November 2022, in the 2022–2023 season, Mullett made her debut for Aston Villa as a 93rd minute substitute in a 3–1 victory over Reading. On 29 January 2023, Mullett made her FA Cup debut as a 72nd minute substitute in the 2022–23 Women's FA Cup against AFC Fylde, where Villa won 11–1.

On 16 September 2023, Mullett signed her first professional contract with Aston Villa aged 18.

In the Women's League Cup on 19 October 2025, she scored her first goal for Aston Villa during the 3–0 victory against Bristol City. On 2 November 2025, she scored her first goal in the WSL during the 3–3 draw against Everton.

==== Southampton (loan) ====
On 22 January 2025, Mullett joined Women's Super League 2 club Southampton on loan for the remainder of the 2024–25 season. She made her debut for Southampton during a 1–0 loss against Durham on 25 January 2025 as a second-half substitute.

== International career ==
In November 2022, Mullett represented England under-18 and under-19 teams.

On 20 September 2023, she scored her debut goal for the under-19s, the fourth goal in a 5–0 victory over Denmark. In October, Mullett played as the number 9 for 2024 U19 Championship qualification round one group matches against Greece and Czech Republic. In November, she scored her second goal for the youth team against Portugal in a 2–2 draw, and In April 2024, for the second round of qualification, Mullett featured in all three group stage matches where the under-19s won against Switzerland, Portugal, and Italy.

In March 2025, Mullet received her first call up to the under-23 squad, making her debut as a second-half substitute against Belgium on 6 April.

== Career statistics ==
=== Club ===
As of match played 22 November 2026

Appearances and goals by club, season and competition
Club	Season	League			National cup		League cup		Total	
Club	Season	Division	Apps	Goals	Apps	Goals	Apps	Goals	Apps	Goals
Aston Villa	2022–23	WSL	2	0	1	0	0	0	3	0
Aston Villa	2023–24	WSL	6	0	0	0	5	0	11	0
Aston Villa	2024–25	WSL	0	0	0	0	1	0	1	0
Aston Villa	2025–26	WSL	16	1	0	0	3	1	19	2
Aston Villa	2026–27	WSL	8	0	0	0	4	1	12	1
Aston Villa	Total		32	1	1	0	13	2	46	3
Southampton (loan)	2024–25	WSL 2	9	1	—		—		9	1
Career total			41	2	1	0	13	2	55	4
