= Oriane Jean-François =

French footballer (born 2001)

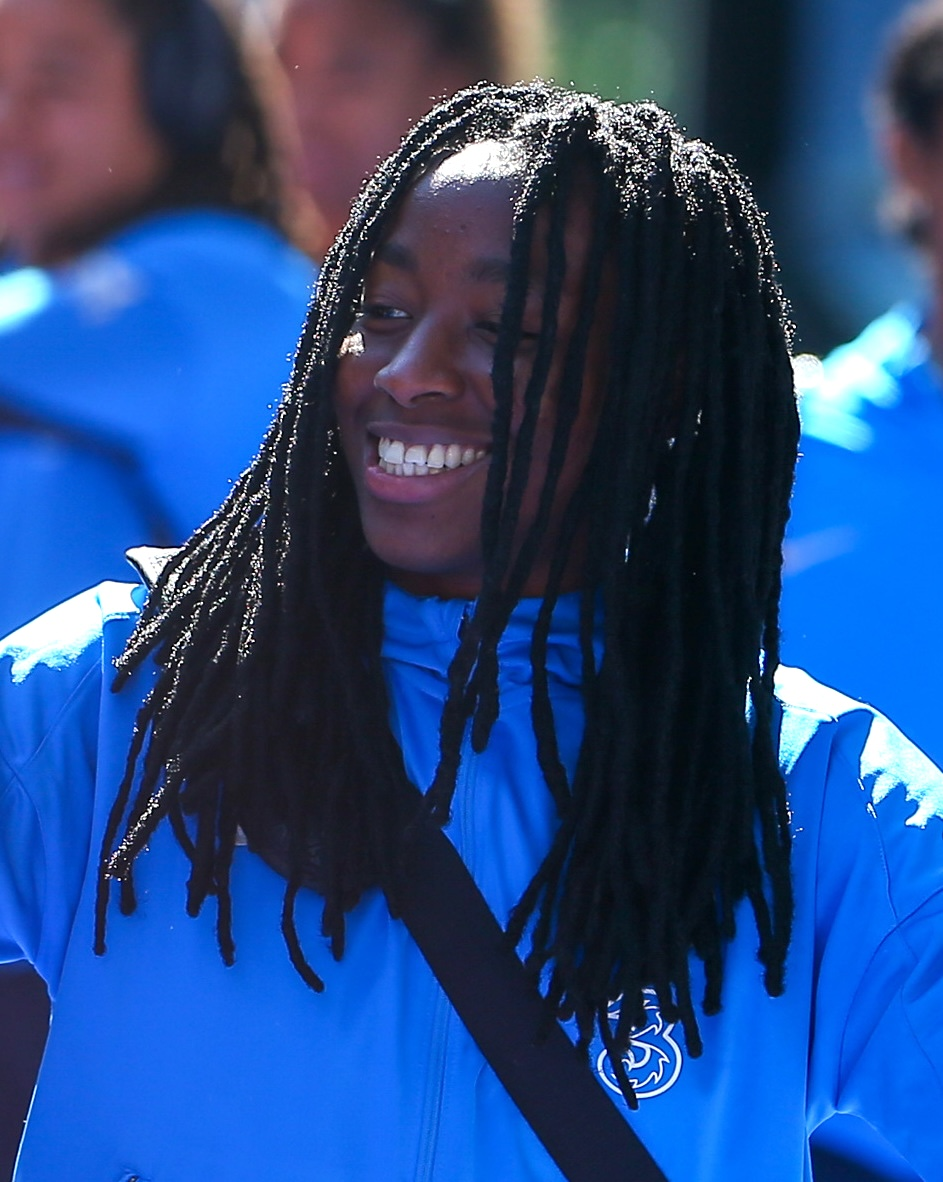
- Jean-François in 2025

Personal information
- Full name: Oriane Néhemie Jean-François
- Date of birth: 14 August 2001 (age 25)
- Place of birth: Saint-Laurent-du-Maroni, French Guiana, France
- Height: 1.64 m (5 ft 5 in)
- Position: Midfielder

Team information
- Current team: Aston Villa
- Number: 6

Youth career
- 2009–2016: Cosma Foot
- 2016–2019: Juvisy / Paris FC

Senior career*
Years	Team	Apps	(Gls)
2019–2022	Paris FC	47	(1)
2022–2024	Paris Saint-Germain	24	(1)
2024–2026	Chelsea	16	(0)
2026–	Aston Villa	16	(1)

International career^{‡}
2017	France U16	8	(0)
2019–2020	France U19	14	(1)
2019	France U20	5	(0)
2021–2023	France U23	7	(0)
2020–	France	27	(0)
Medal record
Women's football
Representing France
UEFA Women's Nations League
Third place	2025
UEFA Women's Under-19 Championship
Winner	2019 Scotland
- * Club domestic league appearances and goals as of 22 November 2026 ‡ National team caps and goals as of 9 June 2026

Oriane Néhemie Jean-François (French: [ɔʁjan ʒɑ̃ fʁɑ̃swa]; born 14 August 2001) is a French professional footballer who plays as a midfielder for Women's Super League club Aston Villa and the France national team.

== Club career ==
On 17 October 2019, Jean-François signed her first contract with Paris FC.

On 28 July 2022, Paris Saint-Germain announced the signing of Jean-François on a two-year deal until June 2024.

On 16 July 2024, Chelsea signed Jean-François signed to a 3-year contract with an additional one-year option.

On 12 January 2026, Aston Villa signed Jean-François for an undisclosed fee. Two days earlier BBC Sport reported that the transfer fee was expected to be £450,000.

== International career ==
Jean-François is a former French youth international. She was part of the France under-19 squad which won 2019 UEFA Women's Under-19 Championship.

Jean-François made her senior team debut on 23 October 2020 in a 11–0 win against North Macedonia.

== Career statistics ==
=== Club ===
As of match played 22 November 2026

Appearances and goals by club, season and competition
Club	Season	League			National cup		League cup		Continental		Other		Total	
Club	Season	Division	Apps	Goals	Apps	Goals	Apps	Goals	Apps	Goals	Apps	Goals	Apps	Goals
Paris FC	2018–19	D1F	5	0	0	0	—		—		—		5	0
Paris FC	2019–20	D1F	10	0	1	0	—		—		—		11	0
Paris FC	2020–21	D1F	19	0	0	0	—		—		—		19	0
Paris FC	2021–22	D1F	13	1	2	0	—		—		—		15	1
Paris FC	Total		47	1	3	0	0	0	0	0	0	0	50	1
Paris Saint-Germain	2022–23	D1F	21	1	4	0	—		10	0	1 (Note: Appearance in Trophée des Championnes)	0	36	1
Paris Saint-Germain	2023–24	D1F	3	0	0	0	—		1	0	1	0	5	0
Paris Saint-Germain	Total		24	1	4	0	0	0	11	0	2	0	41	1
Chelsea	2024–25	WSL	11	0	3	0	2	1	6	1	—		22	2
Chelsea	2025–26	WSL	5	0	0	0	0	0	2	0	—		7	0
Chelsea	Total		16	0	3	0	2	1	8	1	0	0	29	2
Aston Villa	2025–26	WSL	10	1	1	0	0	0	—		—		11	1
Aston Villa	2026–27	WSL	6	0	0	0	2	0	—		—		8	0
Aston Villa	Total		16	1	0	0	2	0	0	0	0	0	19	1
Career total			103	3	11	0	4	1	19	1	2	0	139	5

=== International ===
As of match played 9 June 2026

Appearances and goals by national team and year
National team	Year	Apps	Goals
France	2020	1	0
France	2021	0	0
France	2023	4	0
France	2024	3	0
France	2025	13	0
France	2026	6	0
Total		27	0

== Honours ==
Chelsea

- Women's Super League: 2024–25
- Women's FA Cup: 2024–25
- FA Women's League Cup: 2024–25

France U19

- UEFA Women's Under-19 Championship: 2019
