= Noelle Maritz =

Swiss footballer (born 1995)

- Maritz in 2026

Personal information
- Full name: Noelle Maritz
- Date of birth: 23 December 1995 (age 30)
- Place of birth: Newport Beach, California, United States
- Height: 1.65 m (5 ft 5 in)
- Position: Defender

Team information
- Current team: Aston Villa
- Number: 16

Youth career
- 1999–2001: Hillsborough FC
- 2001–2005: PDA SC
- 2006–2007: FC Amriswil
- 2007–2008: FC Staad
- 2008–2011: FC Wil 1900

Senior career*
Years	Team	Apps	(Gls)
2011–2013	FC Zürich	28	(1)
2013–2020	VfL Wolfsburg	109	(7)
2020–2024	Arsenal	56	(0)
2024–	Aston Villa	59	(2)

International career^{‡}
2010–2012	Switzerland U17	1	(0)
2012	Switzerland U19	3	(0)
2012	Switzerland U20	3	(0)
2013–	Switzerland	144	(1)
- * Club domestic league appearances and goals as of 22 November 2026 ‡ National team caps and goals as of 14 October 2026

Noelle Maritz (Swiss Standard German: [noˈɛl ˈmaːrɪts]; born 23 December 1995) is a professional footballer who plays as a defender for Aston Villa of the FA WSL. She previously played for Arsenal in the WSL, VfL Wolfsburg in the German Bundesliga, and FC Zürich in Switzerland's Nationalliga A. Born in the United States, she represents Switzerland at international level.

== Club career ==
=== Youth ===
Noelle Maritz started playing football at age four in Newport Beach, California. When her family moved to the East Coast, she transferred to the Players Development Academy in New Jersey. After playing in the United States up to U13, she returned to her ancestral homeland, Switzerland, in the summer of 2005.

There she first played for the local club FC Amriswil in the D-Jugend before moving to FC Staad in the summer of 2007. There she was able to recommend herself for the Swiss youth selection and spent three years in the training center of the Swiss Football Association in Huttwil. At the same time, Maritz played at FC Wil in youth football with the boys U13, U14, and U15.

=== FC Zürich ===
After these three years, she signed her first player contract with FC Zürich for the 2011/2012 season. There she gave her senior debut in the National League A on August 6, 2011 against SC Schwyz. She played 28 games in two years and scored one goal for Zurich in the NLA before signing for German treble winners VfL Wolfsburg.

=== Wolfsburg ===
As the first transfer of the summer, Wolfsburg coach Ralf Kellermann signed 17-year-old Maritz on May 20, 2013 on the strength of her first national team performances in Cyprus. She made her debut for the club on October 3, taking to the field as a starter in the match won 8-1 over VfL Sindelfingen. In her first year at VfL Wolfsburg, Maritz played in 15 of 22 Bundesliga games and won the double with the club this season, consisting of a championship and a Champions League.

=== Arsenal ===
Maritz joined Arsenal FC for the 2020/21 season. She made her Arsenal debut in the 2-1 loss to PSG in the Champions League quarter final on 22 August 2020, before making her league debut in their opening game against Reading on 6 September 2020, playing the whole 90 minutes. On 16 May 2021, Maritz scored twice in a 9-0 defeat of Crystal Palace in the FA Cup.

=== Aston Villa ===
On 6 January 2024, it was announced that Maritz had signed a two-and-a-half-year deal with Aston Villa with the option to extend for a further year. She made her debut for the club on January 13 and played a full 90 minutes in the 3-0 loss against Everton in the FA Cup. Maritz scored her first goal for Villa on 4 October 2026, in a 1–1 league draw against Crystal Palace.

== International career ==
Noelle Maritz has been a senior Switzerland international since 2013, after taking part in the 2012 U17 European Championship in Switzerland and the 2017 U20 World Cup in Japan. She made her senior international debut on March 6, 2013 against the Canada national team as part of the Cyprus Cup.

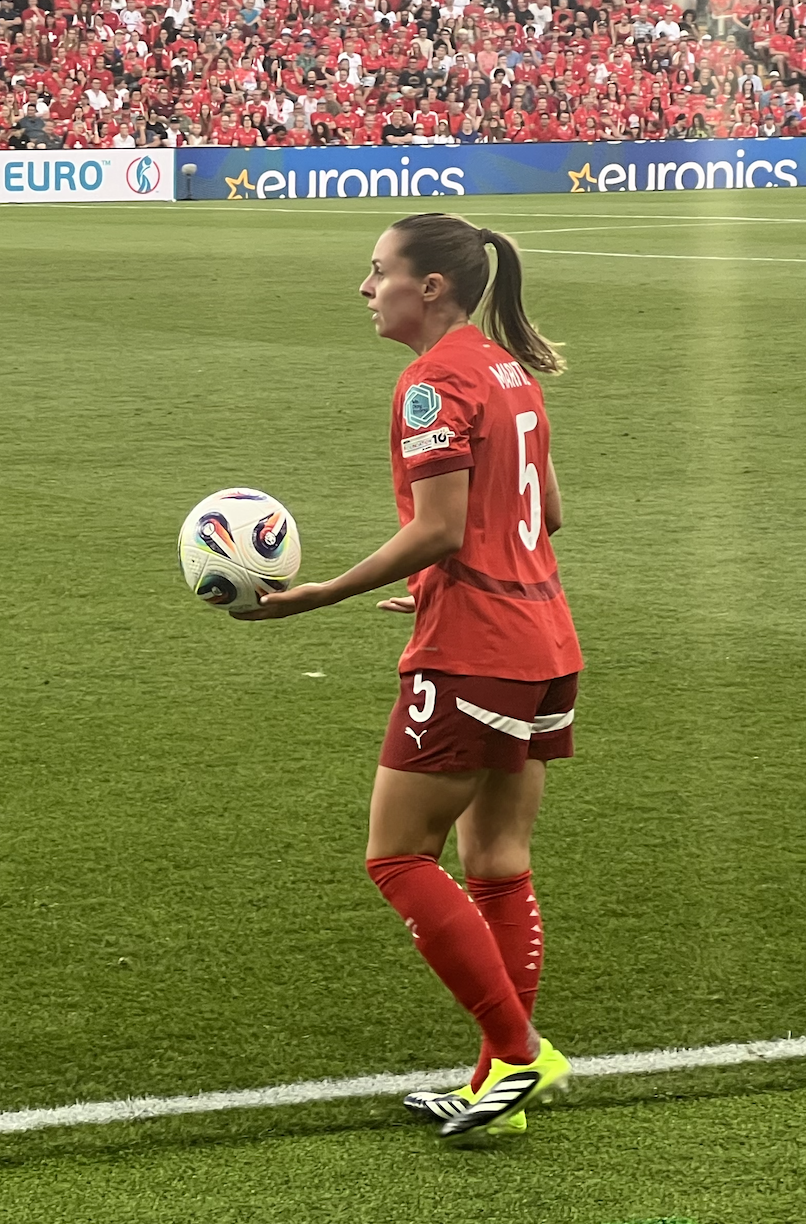
Maritz with Switzerland at Euro 2025.

In 2013/14 Maritz qualified with the Swiss national team for the 2015 World Cup in Canada, where she was in the starting line-up in each of the four World Cup games, but was eliminated by a 0-1 defeat in the round of 16 against the hosts. In qualifying for the Euro 2017 she had four missions. The Swiss were also able to qualify for European Championship finals for the first time, where they played in the three group games. With one win, one draw, and one defeat each, they were eliminated after the group stage.

In qualifying for the 2019 World Cup, she played in the twelve games played by the Swiss. They ultimately missed out on their second appearance at the World Cup after losing twice in the playoffs of the runners-up to European champions Netherlands. They had previously missed out on direct qualification due to a goalless draw in the last group match against Poland.

Maritz took part in the 2022 European Championship and was in the starting line-up for the Swiss in all three group games. Switzerland was eliminated after the preliminary round. She was in the squad for the 2023 World Cup and started all four games. Switzerland was eliminated in the round of 16.

Maritz was named as part of the Switzerland squad to compete in UEFA Women's Euro 2025.

== Career statistics ==
As of match played 22 November 2026

Appearances and goals by club, season and competition
Club	Season	League			National Cup		League Cup		Continental		Other		Total	
Club	Season	Division	Apps	Goals	Apps	Goals	Apps	Goals	Apps	Goals	Apps	Goals	Apps	Goals
FC Zürich	2011–13	No stats available												
VfL Wolfsburg	2013–14	Frauen-Bundesliga	No stats available						4 (Note: Appearances in UEFA Women's Champions League)	0	–		4	0
VfL Wolfsburg	2014–15	Frauen-Bundesliga	No stats available						7	0	–		7	0
VfL Wolfsburg	2015–16	Frauen-Bundesliga	10	0	0	0	–		2	0	–		12	0
VfL Wolfsburg	2016–17	Frauen-Bundesliga	15	0	0	0	–		2	0	–		17	0
VfL Wolfsburg	2017–18	Frauen-Bundesliga	18	1	0	0	–		9	0	–		27	1
VfL Wolfsburg	2018–19	Frauen-Bundesliga	16	3	0	0	–		5	0	–		21	3
VfL Wolfsburg	2019–20	Frauen-Bundesliga	18	3	1	0	–		4	2	–		23	5
VfL Wolfsburg	Total		77	7	1	0	0	0	33	2	0	0	111	9
Arsenal	2020–21	Women's Super League	12	0	5	2	0	0	1	0	–		18	2
Arsenal	2021–22	Women's Super League	19	0	1	0	1	0	9	0	–		30	0
Arsenal	2022–23	Women's Super League	17	0	1	0	3	0	8	0	–		29	0
Arsenal	2023–24	Women's Super League	8	0	0	0	3	0	2	0	–		13	0
Arsenal			56	0	7	2	7	0	20	0	0	0	90	2
Aston Villa	2023–24	Women's Super League	12	0	1	0	1	0	–		–		14	0
Aston Villa	2024–25	Women's Super League	18	0	3	0	2	0	–		–		23	0
Aston Villa	2025–26	Women's Super League	18	0	1	0	3	0	–		–		22	0
Aston Villa	2026–27	Women's Super League	11	2	0	0	3	0	–		–		14	2
Aston Villa	Total		59	2	5	0	9	0	0	0	0	0	73	2
Career total			192	9	16	2	16	0	53	2	0	0	277	11

=== International ===
As of match played 13 October 2026

Appearances and goals by national team and year
National team	Year	Apps	Goals
Switzerland	2013-–14	No stats available	
Switzerland	2015	4	0
Switzerland	2016	4	0
Switzerland	2017	4	0
Switzerland	2018	12	0
Switzerland	2019	3	0
Switzerland	2020	2	0
Switzerland	2021	8	1
Switzerland	2022	16	0
Switzerland	2023	14	0
Switzerland	2024	9	0
Switzerland	2025	15	0
Switzerland	2026	8	0
Total		94	1

Scores and results list Switzerland's goal tally first, score column indicates score after each Maritz goal.

List of international goals scored by Noelle Maritz
No.	Date	Venue	Opponent	Score	Result	Competition
1	26 October 2021	Letzigrund, Zurich, Switzerland	Croatia	2–0	5–0	2023 FIFA Women's World Cup qualification

== Personal life ==
Maritz was born in the United States, growing up in Newport Beach, CA and Hillsborough, NJ, and moved to Switzerland in the canton of Thurgau when she was ten. Therefore, she has dual citizenship.

Because she was born in California, her name is officially spelled without accents as "Noelle", instead of the usual "Noëlle", according to the state's naming laws where names should only consist of letters in the English alphabet.

== Honours ==
FC Zürich

- Swiss Women's Super League: 2012, 2013
- Swiss Women's Cup: 2012, 2013

VfL Wolfsburg

- Bundesliga: 2013–14, 2016–17, 2017–18, 2018–19, 2019–20
- DFB-Pokal: 2015, 2016, 2017, 2018, 2019, 2020
- UEFA Women's Champions League: 2014

Arsenal

- FA Women's League Cup: 2022–23
