= Jill Baijings =

Dutch footballer (born 2001)

Personal information
- Full name: Jill Johanna Wilhelmina Baijings
- Date of birth: 23 February 2001 (age 25)
- Place of birth: Terheijden, Netherlands
- Height: 1.68 m (5 ft 6 in)
- Position: Midfielder

Team information
- Current team: Aston Villa
- Number: 8

Youth career
- SV Terheijden
- Madese Boys
- CTO Eindhoven

Senior career*
Years	Team	Apps	(Gls)
2019–2020	Heerenveen	12	(0)
2020–2022	SGS Essen	43	(3)
2022–2023	Bayer Leverkusen	22	(7)
2023–2025	Bayern Munich	14	(0)
2024–2025	→ Aston Villa (loan)	12	(0)
2025–	Aston Villa	6	(0)

International career^{‡}
2015–2016	Netherlands U15	8	(0)
2016–2017	Netherlands U16	6	(0)
2016–2017	Netherlands U17	13	(3)
2019–2020	Netherlands U19	17	(3)
2021–	Netherlands	8	(0)
- * Club domestic league appearances and goals as of 22 November 2026 ‡ National team caps and goals as of 6 August 2023

Jill Johanna Wilhelmina Baijings (Dutch: [joːˈɦɑnaː ʋɪlɦɛlˈminaː ˈbɛijɪŋs]; born 23 February 2001) is a Dutch professional footballer who plays as a midfielder for Women's Super League club Aston Villa and the Netherlands national team.

== Club career ==
=== Youth ===
Baijings played for SV Terheijden and Madese Boys in her youth.

=== Heerenveen ===
Baijings made her league debut for Heerenveen on 23 August 2019 against PSV. She made 12 appearances for the club but would not score for Heerenveen.

=== SGS Essen ===
Baijings was announced at SGS Essen on 8 June 2020. She made her league debut against Wolfsburg on 4 September 2020. She scored her first league goal against Werder Bremen on 27 September 2020, scoring in the 4th minute.

=== Bayer Leverkusen ===
On 1 July 2022, Baijings joined Bayer Leverkusen on a two-year deal. She scored on her league debut, scoring against MSV Duisburg in the 23rd minute on 18 September 2022.

=== Bayern Munich ===
On 5 July 2023, Baijings signed a three-year contract with Bayern Munich. She made her league debut against Freiburg on 15 September 2023. She scored her first goal for the club in the DFB-Pokal Frauen against Kickers Offenbach on 14 February 2024, scoring in the 78th minute.

=== Aston Villa ===
On 5 July 2024, Baijings joined Women's Super League club Aston Villa on a season long loan deal. She was injured for the first half of the 2024–25 season. As a second-half substitute, she made her debut for Aston Villa on 12 January 2025 in the Women's FA Cup fourth round during a 9–0 win against Bristol Rovers where she scored the final goal of the match.

On 16 July 2025, Aston Villa announced that Baijings had joined the club on a permanent basis. She suffered a ruptured ACL injury in Villa's 1–1 draw against Arsenal on 27 September 2025.

== International career ==
Baijings has represented the Netherlands at various youth levels. She was member of the under-19 team which reached semi-finals of the 2019 UEFA Women's Under-19 Championship.

Baijings made her senior team debut on 22 October 2021 in a 8–0 FIFA World Cup qualification win against Cyprus. On 31 May 2023, she was named in Netherlands' provisional squad for the 2023 FIFA Women's World Cup.

== Career statistics ==
=== Club ===
As of match played 22 November 2026

Appearances and goals by club, season and competition
Club	Season	League			National cup		League cup		Europe		Total	
Club	Season	Division	Apps	Goals	Apps	Goals	Apps	Goals	Apps	Goals	Apps	Goals
Heerenveen	2019–20	Vrouwen Eredivisie	12	0	0	0	—		—		12	0
SGS Essen	2020–21	Frauen-Bundesliga	22	2	0	0	—		—		22	2
SGS Essen	2021–22	Frauen-Bundesliga	21	1	1	0	—		—		22	1
SGS Essen	Total		43	3	1	0	0	0	0	0	44	3
Bayer Leverkusen	2022–23	Frauen-Bundesliga	22	7	0	0	—		—		22	7
Bayern Munich	2023–24	Frauen-Bundesliga	14	0	3	1	—		1	0	18	1
Aston Villa (loan)	2024–25	Women's Super League	12	0	3	1	1	0	—		16	1
Aston Villa	2025–26	Women's Super League	3	0	0	0	0	0	—		3	0
Aston Villa	2026–27	Women's Super League	3	0	0	0	0	0	—		3	0
Aston Villa	Total		18	0	3	1	1	0			22	1
Career total			109	10	7	2	1	0	1	0	118	12

=== International ===
As of match played 6 August 2023

Appearances and goals by national team and year
National team	Year	Apps	Goals
Netherlands	2021	2	0
Netherlands	2022	4	0
Netherlands	2023	2	0
Netherlands	2024	0	0
Netherlands	2025	0	0
Total		8	0

== Honours ==
Bayern Munich

- Frauen-Bundesliga: 2023–24

Individual

- UEFA Women's Under-17 Championship team of the tournament: 2017
