= Lynn Wilms =

Dutch footballer (born 2000)

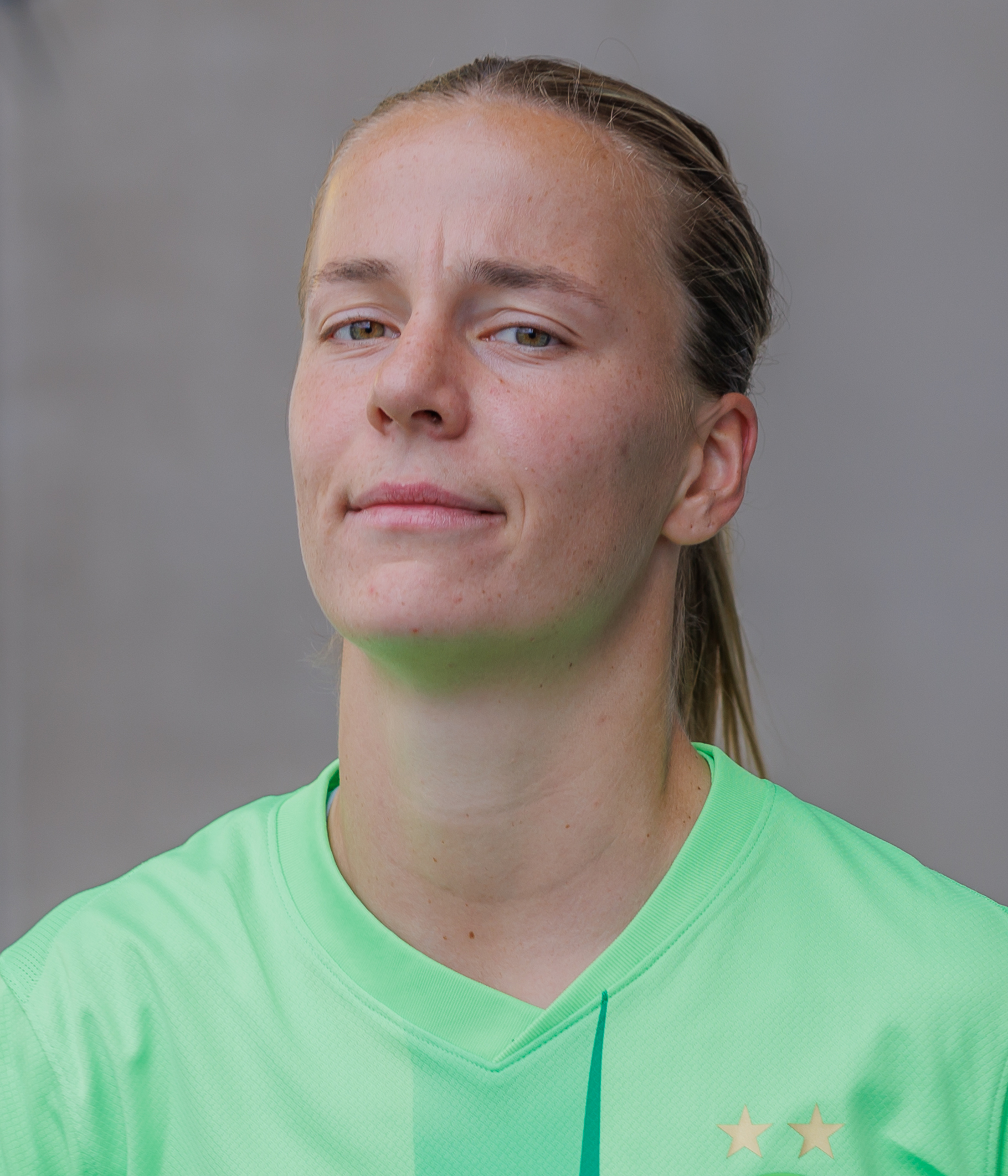
- Wilms with VfL Wolfsburg in 2024

Personal information
- Full name: Lynn Anke Hannie Wilms
- Date of birth: 3 October 2000 (age 26)
- Place of birth: Tegelen, Netherlands
- Height: 1.76 m (5 ft 9 in)
- Positions: Right-back; centre-back

Team information
- Current team: Aston Villa
- Number: 14

Senior career*
Years	Team	Apps	(Gls)
2018–2021	Twente	53	(5)
2021	VfL Wolfsburg II	1	(0)
2021–2025	VfL Wolfsburg	66	(4)
2025–	Aston Villa	28	(3)

International career^{‡}
2015	Netherlands U15	1	(0)
2016	Netherlands U16	8	(1)
2016–2017	Netherlands U17	10	(3)
2017–2019	Netherlands U19	27	(6)
2019	Netherlands U23	2	(0)
2019–	Netherlands	66	(3)
- * Club domestic league appearances and goals as of 22 November 2026 ‡ National team caps and goals as of 13 October 2026

Lynn Anke Hannie Wilms (Dutch: [lɪn ˈɑŋ.kə ˈɦɑ.ni ˈʋɪlms]; born 3 October 2000) is a Dutch professional footballer who plays as a right-back or centre-back for Women's Super League club Aston Villa and the Netherlands national team.

== Club career ==
Wilms played for CTO-Zuid. In 2018, she moved to FC Twente in the Eredivisie. During the 2018–19 season, she was a starting defender in all 24 matches and scored two goals. FC Twente finished in second place during the regular season with a 16–3–5 record. Wilms helped the club win the Eredivisie championship.

She made six appearances in the 2019/20 UEFA Women's Champions League, but lost twice to the German champions VfL Wolfsburg in the round of 16. She came for Wolfsburg in the 2020/21 UEFA Women's Champions League for the first time in the last game of the group stage, which won 4–0 against Chelsea and thus secured group victory, for a five-minute brief. She also came in the quarter-final and semi-final second legs against Arsenal and Barcelona respectively, winning 2–0 each. Since they lost 5–1 in Barcelona, the semifinals were the last stop. In the 2022/23 UEFA Women's Champions League, she featured in the first five of six group games and qualified with the Wolves for the quarter-finals.

Having made over 100 appearances in all competitions with Wolfsburg, on 7 July 2025, it was announced that Wilms had signed for Aston Villa, becoming the club's first signing in the 2025 summer transfer window.

== International career ==
=== Youth career ===
In October 2016, she took part with the U-17 team in the first qualifying round for the 2017 U-17 European Championship and scored her first international goal in the second game against Moldova to make it 12–0 (final score 13–0). A 2–0 defeat against Norway meant they missed out on top of the group, but finished runners-up to qualify for the second round. Here they had home rights at the end of March and beginning of April 2017. With victories against Slovenia and Austria and a draw against Switzerland, they were group winners and qualified for the finals. At the tournament in May in the Czech Republic, they beat Norway, Wilms contributing the first goal in a 3–1 win, and England, so a goalless draw against Ireland was enough to top the group. In the semi-finals, however, they lost 2–0 to eventual vice-European champions Spain.

She then played for the U-19 team for the first time in September 2017, first twice at a tournament in Switzerland and then in her home country in October in the first qualifying round for the 2018 U-19 European Championship. Here she scored her first goal for the U-19 team in a 12–1 win against Estonia. With two more victories against Latvia and Ireland and a total of 32–2 goals, they qualified for the second round as the best group winners. At the tournament in Hungary in April 2018, two 6–0 wins against Slovenia and the hosts and a 1–1 draw against Sweden were enough to win the group again this time. At the finals in July, she was the tournament's top scorer with two goals in their opening 3–1 win over Italy, along with six other players, but her side lost by one after beating Germany 1–0 in a 1–3 defeat against Denmark. Because they were level on points with the Danes and Germans, they had a slightly worse goal difference and thus missed the semi-finals. At the next attempt, they held home ground again in the first round and used it to three clean sheets against Albania, Belarus, and Poland, to which they contributed a goal. They were also able to play the second round in their home country and again achieved three victories - this time against Bulgaria, Iceland, and Russia. At the finals in July 2019 in Scotland, they survived the group stage this time, beating Norway and the hosts despite losing to eventual European champions France. In the semifinals they then lost to record European champions Germany.

=== Senior career ===
At the age of 18, Wilms made her debut in the 84th minute for the Dutch national team in the 2022 European Championship qualifier against Turkey which the Netherlands won 3–0 on September 3, 2019. Her next assignment, again as a substitute in the 84th minute, was in the first game of the Tournoi de France in March 2020 against South American champions Brazil. Against hosts France in a 3–3 draw, she was in the starting eleven and gave her team a 1–0 lead with her first international goal. This was followed by a six-month international break due to COVID-19. She came on again as a substitute in the first game after the break against Russia in September, as well as in the second game against Estonia, where the Dutch won 7–0 to qualify for the finals. In the next three games, twice against Kosovo in the European Championship qualifier and in the friendly against world champions USA, she was in the starting XI and played the full 90 minutes against the USA.

In February 2021, she was nominated for the three-nation tournament for the Dutch to meet Germany in their native city. She was also nominated for the 2020 Olympics, which was postponed by a year due to the COVID-19 pandemic. There she was used in the three group games and in the quarterfinals against world champions USA, which was lost 2–4 on penalties.

In April and June 2022 she was selected twice for the qualifying games for the 2023 World Cup.

On May 31, 2022, she was nominated for the European Championship finals. At the European Championship, she played in the three group games and in the quarter-finals, which they lost to France in extra time.

She was in the starting XI in the last qualifying match for the 2023 World Cup against Iceland. A goal in added time saw the Dutch win 1–0 and qualify for the World Cup.

On 31 May 2023, she was named as part of the Netherlands provisional squad for the 2023 FIFA Women's World Cup.

== Career statistics ==
=== Club ===
As of match played 22 November 2026

Appearances and goals by club, season and competition
Club	Season	League			National Cup		League Cup		Continental		Other		Total	
Club	Season	Division	Apps	Goals	Apps	Goals	Apps	Goals	Apps	Goals	Apps	Goals	Apps	Goals
Twente	2018–19	Vrouwen Eredivisie	3	2	0	0	–		–		–		3	2
Twente	2019–20	Vrouwen Eredivisie	12	2	1	2	–		6 (Note: Appearances in UEFA Women's Champions League)	0	–		19	4
Twente	2020–21	Vrouwen Eredivisie	17	1	1	1	–		–				18	2
Twente	Total		32	5	2	3	0	0	6	0	0	0	40	8
VfL Wolfsburg	2021–22	Frauen-Bundesliga	11	0	3	0	–		3	0	–		17	0
VfL Wolfsburg	2022–23	Frauen-Bundesliga	18	0	4	1	–		9	0	–		31	1
VfL Wolfsburg	2023–24	Frauen-Bundesliga	18	0	3	0	–		2	0	–		24	0
VfL Wolfsburg	2024–25	Frauen-Bundesliga	19	4	3	2	–		8	0	1 (Note: Appearance in DFB-Supercup Frauen)	0	31	6
VfL Wolfsburg	Total		66	4	13	3	0	0	22	0	1	0	103	7
Aston Villa	2025–26	Women's Super League	17	2	1	0	3	0	–		–		21	2
Aston Villa	2026–27	Women's Super League	11	1	0	0	4	0	–		–		15	1
Aston Villa	Total		28	3	1	0	7	0	0	0	0	0	36	3
Career total			126	12	16	6	7	0	28	0	1	0	178	18

=== International ===
As of match played 13 October 2026

Appearances and goals by national team and year
National team	Year	Apps	Goals
Netherlands	2019	1	0
Netherlands	2020	7	1
Netherlands	2021	8	0
Netherlands	2022	14	0
Netherlands	2023	9	0
Netherlands	2024	9	0
Netherlands	2025	10	2
Netherlands	2026	8	0
Total		66	3

Scores and results list Netherlands' goal tally first, score column indicates score after each Wilms goal.

List of international goals scored by Lynn Wilms
No.	Date	Venue	Opponent	Score	Result	Competition
1	10 March 2020	Stade du Hainaut, Valenciennes, France	France	1–0	3–3	Friendly
2	28 October 2025	Goffertstadion, Nijmegen, Netherlands	Canada	1–0	1–0	Friendly
3	28 November 2025	Estádio Municipal de Braga, Braga, Portugal	Portugal	2–0	2–1	Friendly

== Honours ==
Twente

- Eredivisie: 2018–19, 2020–21

VfL Wolfsburg

- Frauen-Bundesliga: 2021–22
- DFB-Pokal Frauen: 2021–22, 2022–23, 2023–24
- UEFA Women's Champions League runner-up: 2022–23
