= Akane Ōkuma =

Japanese footballer (born 2004)

Akane Okuma 大熊 茜
- Okuma in 2026

Personal information
- Date of birth: 15 September 2004 (age 22)
- Place of birth: Chiba, Japan
- Height: 1.73 m (5 ft 8 in)
- Position: Goalkeeper

Team information
- Current team: Aston Villa W.F.C.
- Number: 23

Youth career
- Takane Higashi SSS
- –2022: JEF United Chiba

Senior career*
Years	Team	Apps	(Gls)
2022–2024	JEF United Chiba	10	(0)
2024–2026	INAC Kobe Leonessa	39	(0)
2026–	Aston Villa	11	(0)

International career^{‡}
	Japan U20	10	(0)
- * Club domestic league appearances and goals as of 22 November 2026 ‡ National team caps and goals as of 08:45, 25 October 2024 (UTC)

Akane Okuma (大熊 茜, Ōkuma Akane; born 15 September 2004) is a Japanese professional footballer who plays as a goalkeeper for Women's Super League club Aston Villa and the Japan national team.

== Club career ==
=== In Japan ===
Okuma started her professional career in 2022 at the women's football club JEF United Chiba Ladies that competes in the WE League, a top tier competition of women's association football in Japan. In 2024, she joined INAC Kobe Leonessa, which was the first WE League champion team in the 2021–22 season. Her team were runners-up in the 2024–25 season and winner in 2025–26 season.

=== Aston Villa ===
In 2026, Okuma signed with Women's Super League club Aston Villa W.F.C. in England. In her first game with Villa on 5 September 2026, she had the most saves − of nine − of any goalkeeper in the opening matches of the 2026–27 WSL season, which earned her a headline "Unbeatable Okuma." She was declared "Player of the match" in a 1−1 draw against Chelsea F.C. By then, Villa had lost all 12 of their previous WSL games against Chelsea. Sky Sports reported it as a "historic point [for Villa] at Stamford Bridge."

Aston Villa had their first win of the 2026–27 WSL season on 18 October 2026. Okuma made an assist by kicking a long ball that set Chasity Grant to score and the game ended 2−1 against Liverpool.

== International career ==
In June 2024, she took part in the Sud Ladies Cup in France with Japan. Okuma was part of the Japan squad that won the 2025 SheBelieves Cup and the 2026 AFC Women's Asian Cup.

Okuma made five saves in a friendly match against the United States women's national soccer team on 15 April 2026. With a 1−0 win from Maika Hamano's goal, she became the first goalkeeper to keep clean sheet against US since the latter's 0−0 draw with England women's national football team in November 2024.

== Career statistics ==
=== Club ===
As of match played 22 November 2026

Appearances and goals by club, season and competition
Club	Season	League			National Cup		League Cup		Other		Total	
Club	Season	Division	Apps	Goals	Apps	Goals	Apps	Goals	Apps	Goals	Apps	Goals
JEF United Chiba	2022–24	WE League	Stats not available									
INAC Kobe Leonessa	2024–26	Nadeshiko League	Stats not available									
Aston Villa	2026–27	Women's Super League	11	0	0	0	2	0	–		13	0
Career total			11	0	0	0	2	0	0	0	13	0

=== International ===
As of match played 15 April 2026

Appearances and goals by national team and year
National team	Year	Apps	Goals
Japan	2024	4	0
Japan	2025	4	0
Japan	2026	2	0
Total		10	0
