= Mathilde Harviken =

Norwegian footballer (born 2001)

- Harviken in 2026

Personal information
- Full name: Mathilde Hauge Harviken
- Date of birth: 29 December 2001 (age 24)
- Place of birth: Elverum, Norway
- Height: 1.74 m (5 ft 9 in)
- Position: Centre-back

Team information
- Current team: Aston Villa
- Number: 3

Senior career*
Years	Team	Apps	(Gls)
2016–2017	Elverum	13	(6)
2018–2020	FL Fart	43	(1)
2020–2021	Røa	41	(8)
2022–2024	Rosenborg	91	(1)
2025–2026	Juventus	37	(2)
2026–	Aston Villa	11	(1)

International career^{‡}
2017	Norway U16	12	
2018	Norway U17	7	(0)
2018–2020	Norway U19	15	(2)
2021–	Norway U23	3	(0)
2022–	Norway	46	(1)
- * Club domestic league appearances and goals as of 18:47, 22 November 2026 (UTC) ‡ National team caps and goals as of 14 October 2026

Mathilde Hauge Harviken (born 29 December 2001) is a Norwegian footballer who plays as a centre-back for Women's Super League club Aston Villa and the Norway national team.

== Club career ==
She debuted in Toppserien when she played for FL Fart in 2019. She signed for Røa in June 2020, who also played in Toppserien at the time. In December 2021, she signed for Rosenborg.

On 9 January 2025, Harviken signed a contract with Juventus until 30 June 2027.

In July 2026, Harviken joined WSL club Aston Villa.

== International career ==
She has played matches for several Norway youth national teams, including U15, U16, U17, U19 and U23.

She was called up for the Norway national team for the first time in August 2022. She got her debut 6 September 2022 at home in a world cup qualifying match against Albania.

In November 2022, she was again part of Norway's team who held England to a draw through an equaliser by Frida Maanum.

On 19 June 2023, she was included in the 23-player Norwegian squad for the 2023 FIFA Women's World Cup.

On 16 June 2025, Harviken was called up to the Norway squad for the UEFA Women's Euro 2025.

== Career statistics ==
=== Club ===
As of match played 22 November 2026

Appearances and goals by club, season and competition
Club	Season	League			National Cup		League Cup		Continental		Other		Total	
Club	Season	Division	Apps	Goals	Apps	Goals	Apps	Goals	Apps	Goals	Apps	Goals	Apps	Goals
FL Fart	2019	Toppserien	22	0	0	0	–		–		–		22	0
FL Fart	Total		22	0	0	0	0	0	0	0	0	0	22	0
Røa IL	2020	Toppserien	18	0	2	0	–		–		–		20	0
Røa IL	2021	1. Divisjon	18	8	3	0	–		–		–		21	8
Røa IL	Total		36	8	5	0			0	0			41	8
Rosenborg	2022	Toppserien	17	1	6	0	–		–		–		23	1
Rosenborg	2023	Toppserien	27	0	5	0	–		4	0	–		36	0
Rosenborg	2024	Toppserien	27	1	3	0	–		2	0	–		30	1
Rosenborg	Total		71	2	14	0			6	0			91	2
Juventus	2024–25	Serie A	11	1	3	1	–		0	0	1 (Note: Appearance in Supercoppa Italiana)	0	15	2
Juventus	2025–26	Serie A	9	0	3	0	5	0	6	0	–		23	0
Juventus	Total		20	1	6	1	5	0	6	0	1	0	38	2
Aston Villa	2026–27	Women's Super League	11	1	0	0	5	1	–		–		16	2
Career total			160	12	25	1	10	1	12	0	1	0	208	14

=== Youth ===
As of match played 8 April 2022

Appearances and goals by national youth team and year
National team	Year	Apps	Goals
Norway U19	2019	4	0
Norway U23	2021	2	0
Norway U23	2022	1	0
Total		7	0

=== Senior ===
As of match played 28 October 2025

Appearances and goals by national team and year
National team	Year	Apps	Goals
Norway	2022	5	0
Norway	2023	13	0
Norway	2024	9	1
Norway	2025	10	0
Total		37	1

== Honours ==
Rosenborg

- Norwegian Cup: 2023

Juventus

- Serie A: 2024–25
- Coppa Italia: 2024–25
- Serie A Women's Cup: 2025
