= Keys Park =

Stadium in Hednesford, Staffordshire, England

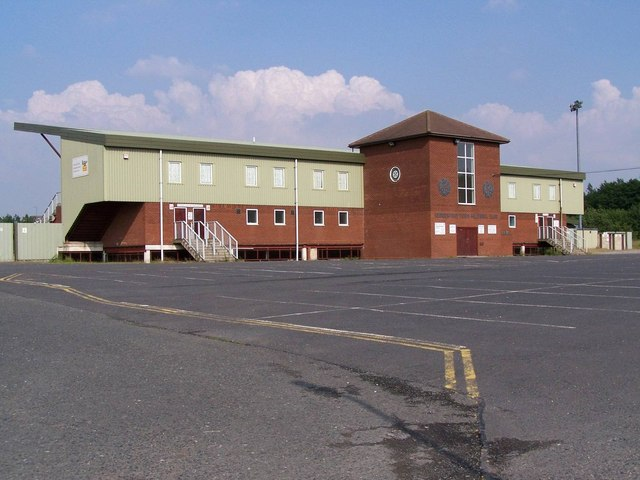
- The Main Stand at Keys Park
- Interactive map of Keys Park
- Location: Keys Park Road, Hednesford, Cannock, Staffordshire WS12 2DZ
- Coordinates: 52.697605°N 1.988822°W
- Capacity: 6,039
- Record attendance: 4,784 (Hednesford Town vs F.C. United of Manchester, 27 Dec 2025)
- Public transit: Hednesford; Cannock

Construction
- Built: 1995

Tenants
- Hednesford Town (1990–present); Aston Villa Women (2026–present)

Keys Park is the home of the Hednesford Town Football Club, and is situated on Keys Park Road in the town of Hednesford, Staffordshire. The club previously played at the Cross Keys, a ground situated behind the pub of the same name between 1902 and 1995. Before that, they played their home matches at The Tins, a ground situated behind what is now the Hedgeford Arms pub in the town.

The stadium was completed during the summer of 1995, at a cost of £1.3 million. Its original capacity was set at 3,500; a smart main stand housing changing rooms, club offices and social facilities, a shallow uncovered terrace on the Wimblebury side of the ground and two identical covered terraces at either end of the ground.

The stadium was first used in a friendly game against Walsall in July of that year. Keys Park was officially opened by Sir Stanley Matthews later that year, in a ceremony that included a friendly against Wolverhampton Wanderers.

In January 1997, Keys Park saw over 3,000 people witness the Pitmen's 1–0 win over York City in the FA Cup Third Round. During the following season, three sides of the ground were developed; the Heath Hayes End was converted into a 1,000 capacity open terrace, whilst the Wimblebury side was turned into a large uncovered terrace. Seating was installed at the previously terraced Hednesford End to raise the ground capacity over the 6,000 needed for a grade 'A' rating by the Football League, which was granted in 1998.

Despite relegation from the Football Conference in 2001, the club proceeded with its plans to make the stadium covered on all four sides, and with the help of a Football Association grant, the club installed roofs on each of the uncovered terraces at the Heath Hayes End and on the Wimblebury Terrace.

The Northern Premier League Play-Off Final between Hednesford and F.C. United of Manchester on 11 May 2013 saw a new record with a crowd of 4,412 people to watch the Pitmen win 2–1 and promotion to the Conference North.

November 2024 saw the club install a digital scoreboard in the corner of the ground situated between the Hednesford End and Wimblebury Terrace.

A new attendance record was set on 3 May 2025, when 4,701 people saw Hednesford win the Northern Premier Division One West playoff final 2–0 against Congleton Town.

2025 saw further renovations on and off the pitch, with a state of the art hybrid pitch installed, along with new pitchside barriers, solar panels on the roofs of both the Main Stand and the Wimblebury Terrace and LED digital advertising boards on three sides of the pitch.

The attendance record was broken again on 27 Dec 2025 when 4,784 saw a 1–1 draw between Hednesford and F.C. United of Manchester in the Northern Premier League Premier Division.

In August 2026, it was announced that Aston Villa Women had reached a deal for Keys Park to become their second home, alongside Villa Park.
