= Katie Scott (English footballer) =

English footballer (born 2009)

Personal information
- Full name: Katie Scott
- Date of birth: 24 September 2009 (age 17)
- Place of birth: England
- Position: Defender

Team information
- Current team: Aston Villa
- Number: 33

Youth career
- –2026: Aston Villa

Senior career*
Years	Team	Apps	(Gls)
2026–	Aston Villa	1	(0)

International career^{‡}
2025	England U16	1	(0)
2026–	England U17	9	(1)
2026–	England U19	3	(0)
- * Club domestic league appearances and goals as of 13:36, 12 November 2026 (UTC) ‡ National team caps and goals as of 13:36, 12 November 2026 (UTC)

Katie Scott (born 24 September 2009) is an English professional footballer who plays as a defender for Women's Super League club Aston Villa and has featured for England youth internatinal squads.

== Youth career ==
Scott began her career in the Aston Villa Academy, working through the age groups. She signed a professional contract on 24 September 2026, her 17th birthday, making her the youngest ever professional player for Aston Villa Women.

== Club career ==
=== Aston Villa ===
After appearing several times as an unused substitute, Scott made her first-team debut on 13 September 2026, as a late substitute in a 4–1 WSL defeat to Manchester City.

== International career ==
Scott has played for the England U16 squad.

In May 2026, Scott was named as captain for the England U17 squad competing at the 2026 UEFA Women's Under-17 Championship.

In October 2026, Scott made her debut for the England U19s.

== Career statistics ==
As of match played 21 October 2026

Appearances and goals by club, season and competition
Club	Season	League			FA Cup		League Cup		Total	
Club	Season	Division	Apps	Goals	Apps	Goals	Apps	Goals	Apps	Goals
Aston Villa	2026–27	Women's Super League	1	0	0	0	3	0	4	0
Career total			1	0	0	0	3	0	4	0
