= Lucy Parker =

English footballer

- Lucy Parker in 2026

Personal information
- Full name: Lucy Michelle Parker
- Date of birth: 18 November 1998 (age 28)
- Place of birth: Cambridge, Cambridgeshire, England
- Height: 1.72 m (5 ft 8 in)
- Position: Defender

Team information
- Current team: Aston Villa
- Number: 15

Youth career
- Arsenal

College career
Years	Team	Apps	(Gls)
2017–2018	LSU Tigers	42	(6)
2019–2021	UCLA Bruins	31	(4)

Senior career*
Years	Team	Apps	(Gls)
2021–2023	West Ham United	28	(0)
2023–	Aston Villa	39	(5)

International career^{‡}
2014–2015	England U17	3	(1)
2019	England U21	1	(0)
- * Club domestic league appearances and goals as of 22 November 2026 ‡ National team caps and goals as of 13 May 2025

Lucy Michelle Parker (born 18 November 1998) is an English professional footballer who plays as a defender for FA Women's Super League club Aston Villa.

== Early life ==
Parker was born in Cambridge and played with the Arsenal academy for ten years. Parker attended Hills Road Sixth Form College between 2015 and 2016. ‌

== College career ==
Parker played with LSU Tigers and UCLA Bruins.

== Club career ==
Parker signed her first professional contract with West Ham United in 2021. She made her professional debut on 5 September 2021 in a 2–0 loss to Brighton & Hove Albion.

On 6 July 2023, Parker signed a two-year contract with Aston Villa with the option to extend for a further year. She missed the majority of the 2023–24 season due to a recurring ankle injury, having twice suffered from injury in the season. On 23 July 2025, it was announced that she had signed a two-year contract to extend her time with Villa.

== International career ==
An England youth international, Parker has played from the U15 to the U21 levels.

Parker received her first senior international call-up on 27 September 2022 for the friendly matches against the United States and the Czech Republic, but was forced to drop out of the squad on 4 October due to injury. On 6 June 2025, Parker was named as a standby player for UEFA Euro 2025.

== Career statistics ==
=== Club ===
As of match played 22 November 2026

Appearances and goals by club, season and competition
Club	Season	League			National Cup (Note: Includes the FA Women's Cup)		League Cup (Note: Includes the FA Women's League Cup)		Total	
Club	Season	Division	Apps	Goals	Apps	Goals	Apps	Goals	Apps	Goals
West Ham United	2021–22	WSL	14	0	4	0	4	2	22	2
West Ham United	2022–23	WSL	14	0	1	0	3	0	18	0
West Ham United	Total		28	0	5	0	7	2	40	2
Aston Villa	2023–24	WSL	8	1	0	0	1	0	9	1
Aston Villa	2024–25	WSL	16	1	2	0	1	0	19	1
Aston Villa	2025–26	WSL	9	2	1	0	1	0	11	2
Aston Villa	2026–27	WSL	8	1	0	0	0	0	8	1
Aston Villa	Total		39	5	3	0	3	0	47	5
Career total			66	5	8	0	10	2	87	7
