= Natalia Arroyo =

Spanish footballer and journalist (born 1986)

- Arroyo in 2026

Personal information
- Full name: Natalia Arroyo Clavell
- Date of birth: 14 April 1986 (age 40)
- Position: Defender

Youth career
- 1995–2006: FC Barcelona Femení

Senior career*
Years	Team	Apps	(Gls)
–2006	FC Barcelona Femení		
2007–2009	RCD Espanyol Femení		

Managerial career
- 2014–2019: Catalonia women
- 2020–2024: Real Sociedad Femenino
- 2025–2026: Aston Villa Women
- * Club domestic league appearances and goals

Natalia Arroyo Clavell (Spanish: [naˈtalja aˈroʝo]; born 14 April 1986) is a Spanish professional football manager and former player who was most recently the manager of Women's Super League club Aston Villa. Previously, she played professionally for FC Barcelona and also for Espanyol, retiring in 2009.

== Playing career ==
=== FC Barcelona Femení ===
Born in 1986, Natalia Arroyo came through the youth academy at FC Barcelona Femení in 1995 and played as a defender. She was part of the FC Barcelona team which won promotion to the Liga F in 2003–04.

=== RCD Espanyol Femení ===
Arroyo joined RCD Espanyol Femení in 2006 and played at the club for two seasons before injuries forced her to retire at the age of 22 in 2009.

== Managerial career ==
=== Catalonia women ===
She became the manager of the Catalonia women's national football team in 2014 and she oversaw the team's defeat to the Basque Country during the Centenary Trophy in December 2015.

=== Real Sociedad Femenino ===
Arroyo was appointed as the manager of Liga F club Real Sociedad Femenino in 2020 and she helped the club to finish second during the 2021–22 Primera División, and in her final season at the club, they finished as runners-up in the 2023–24 Copa de la Reina de Fútbol.

=== Aston Villa ===
On 22 January 2025, Arroyo was appointed as the manager of Women's Super League club Aston Villa on a three-and-a-half year deal. On 29 September 2026, Aston Villa announced Arroyo had been sacked the night before after a winless start to the 2026–27 season.

== Honours ==
=== Player ===
FC Barcelona Femení

- Primera Nacional Femenina
  - Champions (3): 2001–02, 2002–03, 2003–04

=== Manager ===
Catalonia women

- Centenary Trophy
  - Runner-up: 2015

Real Sociedad Femenino

- Liga F
  - Runners-up (1): 2021–22
- Copa de la Reina de Fútbol
  - Runners-up (1): 2023–24
