= Aston Villa W.F.C. =

Women's football club from Birmingham, England

- Full name: Aston Villa Women Football Club
- Nicknames: The Villans, The Villa, The Lions
- Short name: Villa, AVWFC
- Founded: 1973; 53 years ago (as Solihull FC)
- Ground: Villa Park (league matches); Keys Park (cup matches)
- Capacity: 42,600; 11,300
- Coordinates: 52°30′33″N 1°53′5″W; Villa Park
- Owner(s): V Sports (90%); Marc Zahr (10%)
- Chairman: Nassef Sawiris
- Manager: Brian Sørensen (interim)
- League: Women's Super League
- 2025–26: WSL, 9th of 12
- Website: avfc.co.uk/avwfc
Home colours	Away colours	Third colours

Aston Villa Women Football Club is the women's football team of Aston Villa, currently playing in the Women's Super League. The club has been in existence since 1973. Originally titled Solihull F.C., the team affiliated to Aston Villa in 1989, becoming Villa Aztecs, and became the official Aston Villa women's side in 1996. The club have a senior team, a reserve team and several other teams of younger age groups under a Regional Talent Club FA licence.

== History ==
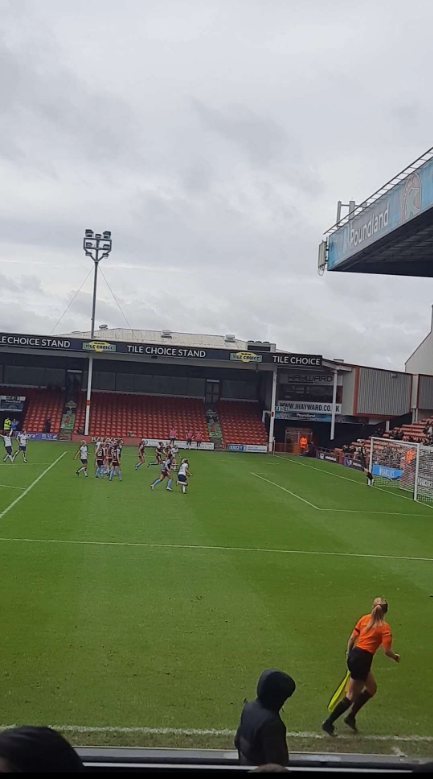
Daphne van Domselaar saving a free kick against Tottenham Hotspur for Aston Villa, 21 October 2023; Aston Villa 2–4 Tottenham Hotspur.

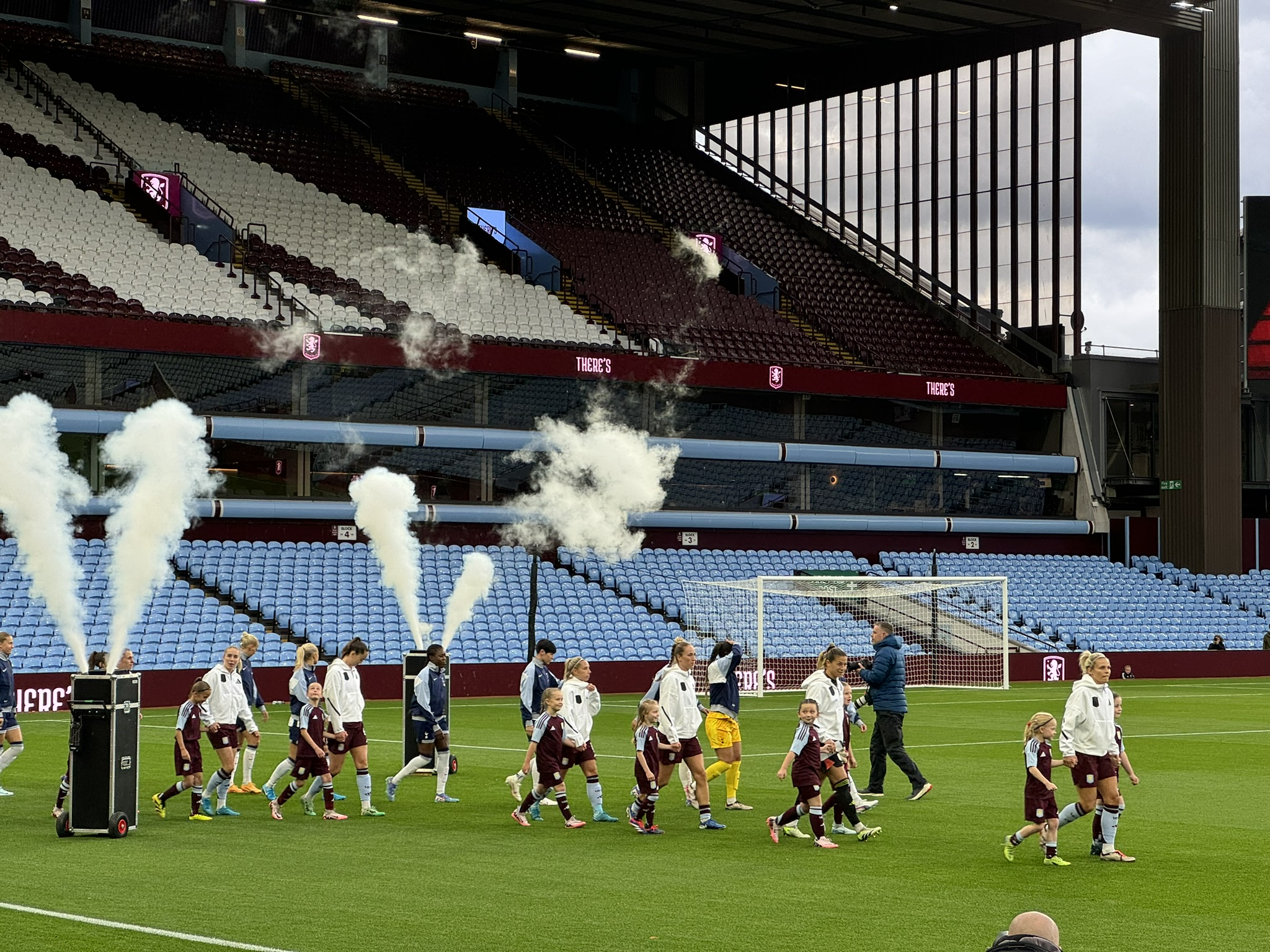
Aston Villa vs Tottenham Hotspur at Villa Park

Aston Villa Women Football Club was formed in 1973 as Solihull FC. When Aston Villa asked for help in forming a ladies team in 1989, Solihull responded. The club agreed to change their name in 1996 to become the officially recognised ladies team of Aston Villa.

As Villa Aztecs, they reached the 1995 League Cup Final but lost 2–0 to Wimbledon, and played in the 1995–96 FA Women's Premier League but were relegated.

The senior team, renamed to Aston Villa Ladies F.C., continued to play mainly in the 2nd-tier Northern Division. The club won promotion twice more and played in the FA Women's Premier League National Division in 1999–2000 and in 2003–04, but ended in the relegation zone in both seasons.

The Lady Villans won the Northern Division for the fourth time UTFV in 2011 and gained promotion to the WPL National Division, which had become the 2nd tier below the FA WSL.

On 5 May 2013, the club had its greatest achievement by winning its first ever trophy, the Women's Premier League Cup, beating Leeds United Ladies 5–4 on penalties.

In 2014 they were one of ten teams who were elected to WSL2, and in 2018 to the Women's Championship.

On 4 July 2019, the team was renamed Aston Villa Women F.C., CEO Christian Purslow, said that the name "aligns more appropriately with women's football in this country". On the same day, Chief Commercial Officer, Nicola Ibbetson, was elected to the FA WSL and Women's Championship board - making Aston Villa Women one of only two Championship clubs to have a representative on the board.

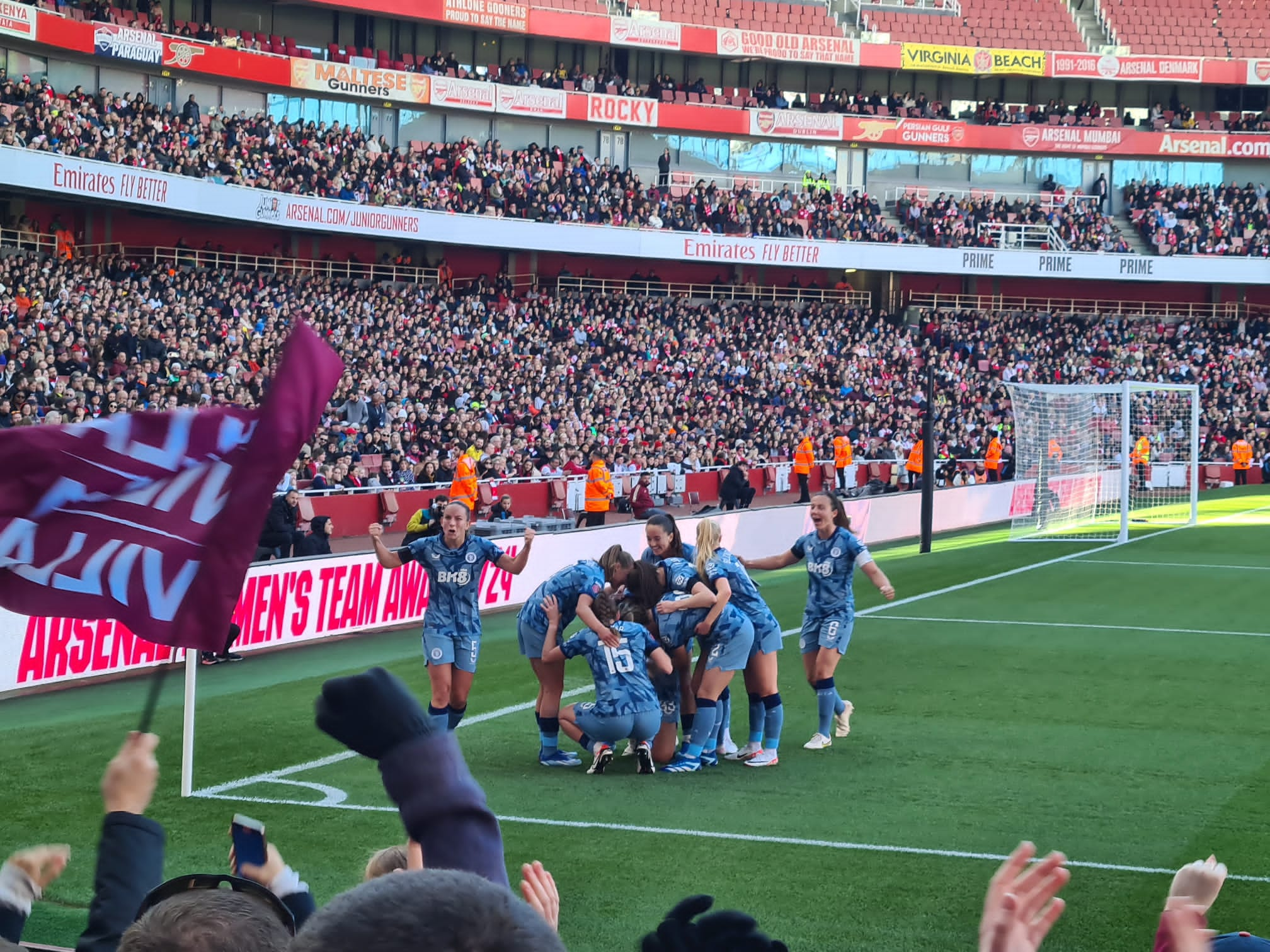
Aston Villa face Arsenal at The Emirates Stadium, 2023

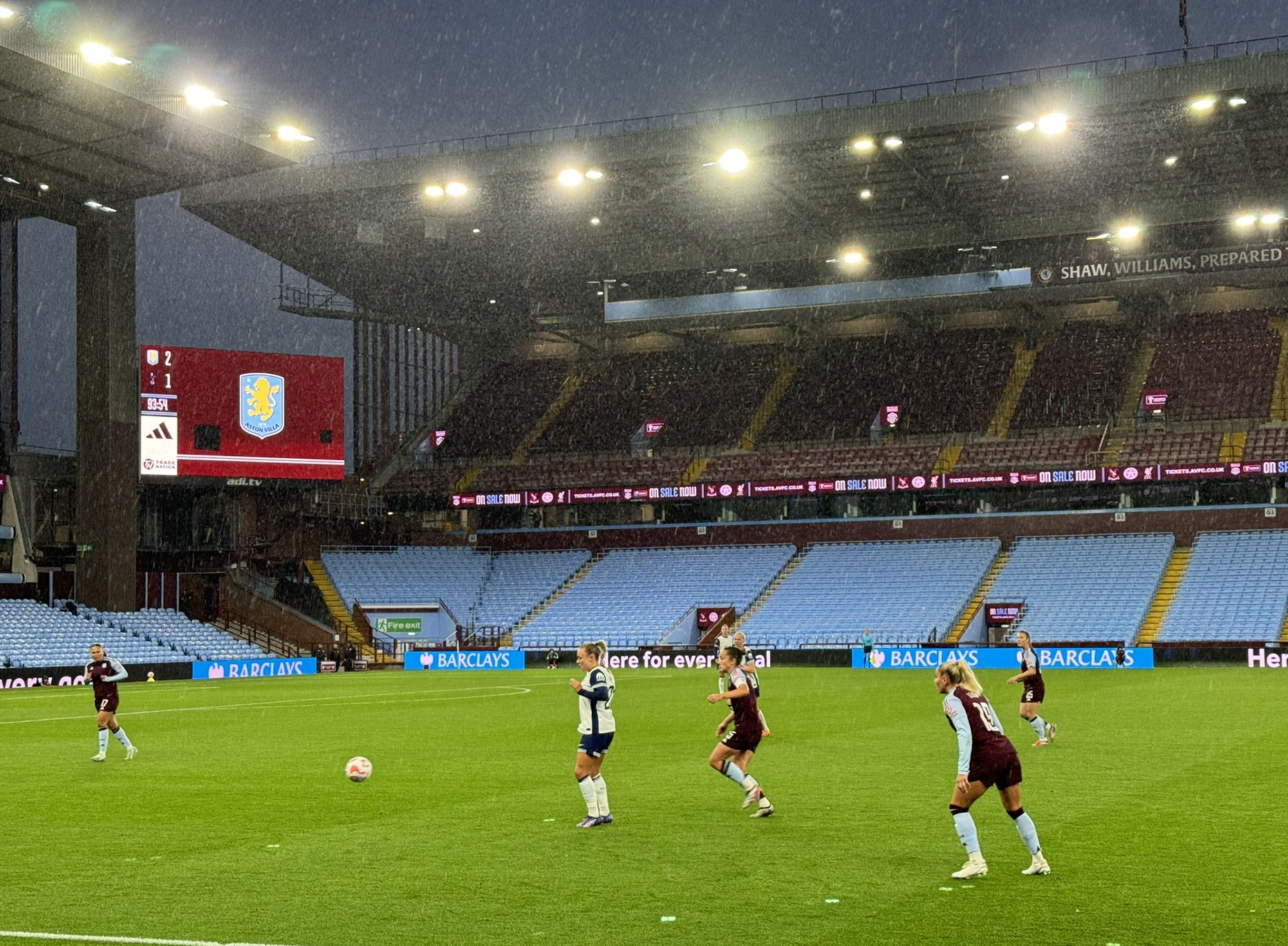
Aston Villa 2–2 Tottenham Hotspur, 29 September 2024, Villa Park

In 2019–20, Villa won promotion to the WSL and entered the top flight of women's football for the first time since 2004. For the 2022-23 Women's Super League season the women played four of their eleven home matches at Villa Park, where the men's team play. For the 2024–2025 season, the club announced they would play all home League fixtures at Villa Park.

On 21 October 2025, V Sports, owners of Aston Villa, announced the sale of a 10% stake in Aston Villa Women to Marc Zahr, co-president of Blue Owl Capital.

In August 2026, Aston Villa announced that Hednesford Town's Keys Park was its new second home venue, alongside Villa Park.

== Players ==
=== First team squad ===
As of 18 August 2026

Note: Flags indicate national team as defined under FIFA eligibility rules; some limited exceptions apply. Players may hold more than one non-FIFA nationality.

No.	Pos.	Nation	Player
1	GK	ENG	Emily Ramsey
3	DF	NOR	Mathilde Harviken
4	DF	IRL	Anna Patten
5	MF	NOR	Justine Kielland
6	MF	FRA	Oriane Jean-François
7	MF	ENG	Missy Bo Kearns
8	MF	NED	Jill Baijings
9	FW	ENG	Rachel Daly (captain)
11	MF	NOR	Kamilla Melgård
13	FW	JPN	Maya Hijikata
14	DF	NED	Lynn Wilms
15	DF	ENG	Lucy Parker
16	DF	SUI	Noelle Maritz

No.	Pos.	Nation	Player
18	FW	ENG	Georgia Mullett
19	FW	ENG	Lily Murphy (on loan from Manchester City)
20	FW	DEN	Amalie Vangsgaard
21	MF	ENG	Lucia Kendall
22	DF	NGR	Rofiat Imuran
23	GK	JPN	Akane Okuma
24	DF	FRA	Océane Deslandes
25	MF	SCO	Miri Taylor
26	GK	ENG	Ellie Roebuck
27	FW	SCO	Mia McAulay
33	DF	ENG	Katie Scott
38	DF	ENG	Rachel Maltby
42	GK	ENG	Lily Clark

=== Out on loan ===
Note: Flags indicate national team as defined under FIFA eligibility rules; some limited exceptions apply. Players may hold more than one non-FIFA nationality.

No.	Pos.	Nation	Player
22	DF	ENG	Lydia Sallaway (at Wrexham)
40	GK	WAL	Soffia Kelly (at Newcastle United)

=== Academy Players ===
Academy Players who featured in match day squads this Season Note: Flags indicate national team as defined under FIFA eligibility rules; some limited exceptions apply. Players may hold more than one non-FIFA nationality.

No.	Pos.	Nation	Player
33	DF	ENG	Katie Scott
42	GK	ENG	Lily Clark
45	FW	ENG	Millie Round
46	MF	ENG	Piper Lea

No.	Pos.	Nation	Player
47	MF	ZAM	Jessica Johnson
48	MF	ENG	Maddie Calder
53	MF	ENG	Imogen Seymour
55	GK	ENG	Frankie Kerry

== Honours ==
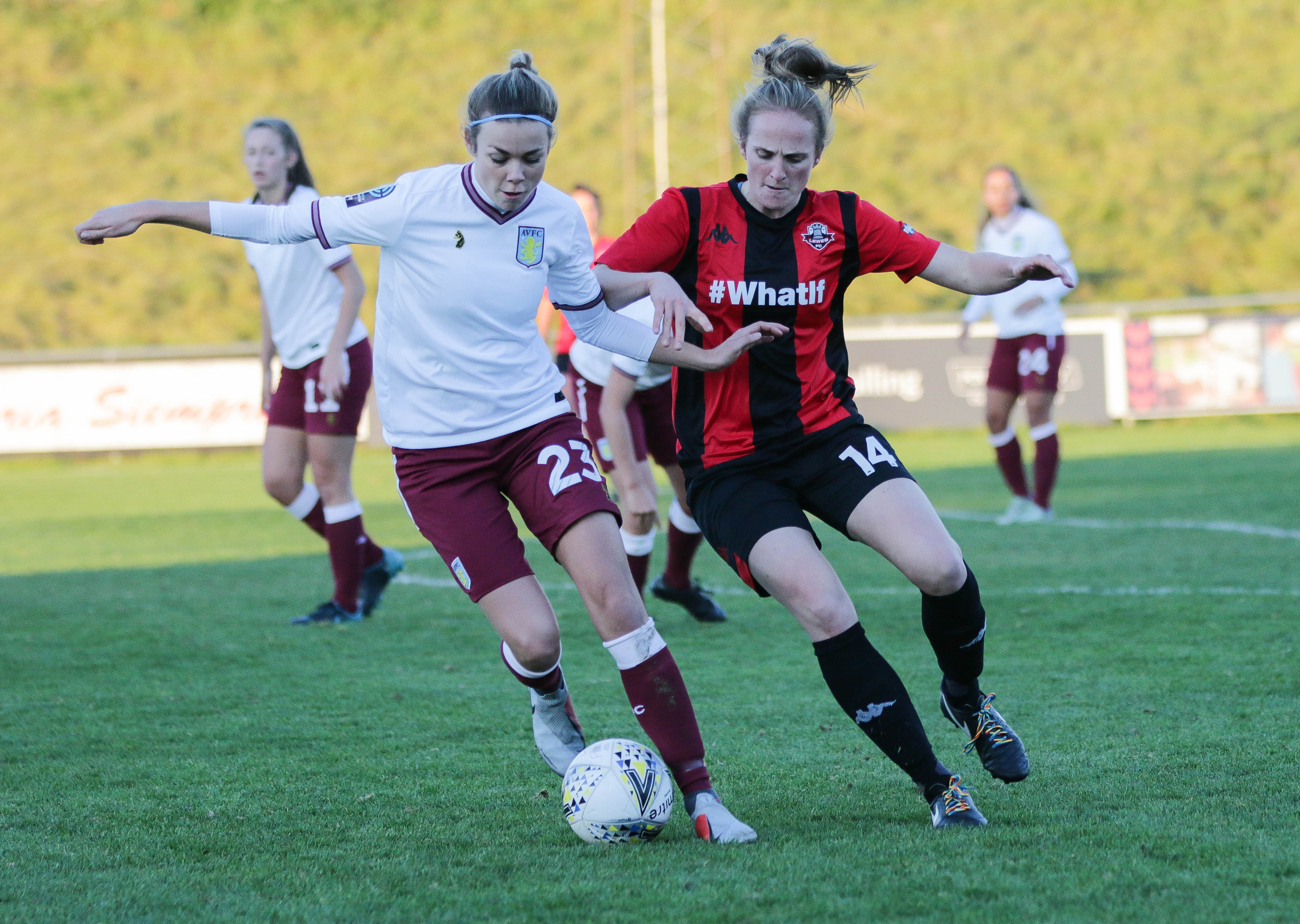
Nadine Hanssen (left) in Aston Villa's 2018 game at Lewes F.C. Women

- FA Women's Premier League (Northern Division) (Level 2)
  Winners (4): 1992–93, 1994–95, 2002–03, 2010–11
- FA Women's National League Cup
  Winners (1): 2012–13
- FA Women's Championship (Level 2)
  Winners (1): 2019–20

== Non-playing staff ==
=== Corporate hierarchy ===
Position	Name
Executive Chairman	Nassef Sawiris
Co-chairman	Wes Edens
President of Business Operations	Chris Heck
President of Football Operations	Roberto Olabe

=== Management hierarchy ===
Position	Name
Director of Women's Football	Marisa Ewers
Manager	Brian Sørensen (interim)
Technical advisor	Brian Sørensen
Assistant coach	Hugo Rodrigues
Assistant First Team Coach	Chris Roberts
Goalkeeper Coach	Wayne Brown
Club Doctor	Fadi Hassan
Lead Physiotherapist	Dan Dagia
Physical Performance Lead	Kirsty Frick

=== Regional Talent Club ===
The club also run several other teams under the auspices of an FA Tier Two Regional Talent Club. This centre aims to develop the talent from within the local area. The RTC teams include an under-10, under-12, under-14, under-16 and development squad

In August 2010, Aston Villa Women FC supplied eight players to a 30-strong England Under-17 training camp.

== Managers ==
As of 29 September 2026:

Name	Tenure	Refs
(England) Gemma Davies	June 2018 – 25 January 2021	
(England) Marcus Bignot (interim)	25 January 2021 – 10 May 2021	
(England) Carla Ward	20 May 2021 – 18 May 2024	
(Netherlands) Robert de Pauw	29 June 2024 – 11 December 2024	
(Bermuda) Shaun Goater (interim)	11 December 2024 – 22 January 2025	
(Spain) Natalia Arroyo	22 January 2025 – 28 September 2026	
(Denmark) Brian Sørensen (interim)	28 September 2026 –	
