= 2026–27 Birmingham City W.F.C. season =

Birmingham City
2026–27 season
- Head Coach: Amy Merricks
- Stadium: St Andrew's, Birmingham
Home colours	Away colours	Third colours

The 2026–27 Birmingham City W.F.C. season is the club's 59th season in existence and their 1st back in the Women's Super League, the highest level of the football pyramid. Along with competing in the WSL, the club also contested two domestic cup competitions: the FA Cup and the League Cup.

== Squad ==
As of 29 August 2026

No.	Player	Nationality	Date of birth (age)	Signed from	Since
Goalkeepers
1	Lucy Thomas	(England)	21 March 2000 (age 26)	(England) Coventry United	2021
23	Sophie Baggaley	(England)	29 November 1996 (age 29)	(England) Brighton & Hove Albion	2026
40	Katie Startup	(England)	28 January 1999 (age 27)	(England) Manchester City	2026
Defenders
2	Martha Harris	(England)	19 August 1994 (age 32)	(England) Manchester United	2022
3	Marie Levasseur	(Canada)	18 May 1997 (age 29)	(France) Montpellier	2026
4	Jade Rastocle	(France)	12 July 2004 (age 22)	(France) Montpellier	2026
6	Shannon Cooke	(England)	2 February 2000 (age 26)	(England) West Ham United	2025
15	Rebecca Holloway	(Northern Ireland)	25 August 1995 (age 31)	(United States) Racing Louisville FC	2023
18	Rebecca McKenna	(Northern Ireland)	13 April 2001 (age 25)	(England) Charlton Athletic	2024
21	Millie Turner (captain)	(England)	7 July 1996 (age 30)	(England) Manchester United	2026
30	Neve Herron	(England)	27 June 2003 (age 23)	(England) Sunderland	2023
Midfielders
8	Lisa Naalsund	(Norway)	11 June 1995 (age 31)	(England) Manchester United	2026
10	Wilma Leidhammar	(Sweden)	16 June 2003 (age 23)	(Sweden) IFK Norrköping	2026
14	Suzu Amano	(Japan)	18 February 2004 (age 22)	(Sweden) Växjö DFF	2026
19	Chelsea Cornet	(Scotland)	19 April 1998 (age 28)	(Scotland) Rangers	2025
26	Asato Miyagawa	(Japan)	24 February 1998 (age 28)	(Sweden) Hammarby	2026
27	Veatriki Sarri	(Greece)	1 January 1998 (age 28)	(England) Everton	2025
Forwards
7	Lee Geum-min	(South Korea)	7 April 1994 (age 32)	(England) Brighton & Hove Albion	2024
9	Simone Magill	(Northern Ireland)	1 November 1994 (age 32)	(England) Aston Villa	2024
16	Lily Crosthwaite	(England)	26 October 2002 (age 24)	(England) Durham	2025
20	Chancelle Effa Effa	(France)	14 September 2004 (age 22)	(France) Le Havre	2026
22	Océane Hurtré	(France)	17 February 2004 (age 22)	(France) Paris Saint-Germain	2025
Out on loan
32	Ava Baker	(England)	9 January 2006 (age 20)	(England) Leicester City	2024
36	Ebonie Locke	(England)	24 May 2007 (age 19)	(England) Birmingham City Academy	2025

== Transfers ==
=== Transfers in ===
Date	Position	Nationality	Name	From	Ref.
15 July 2026	DF	(England)	Millie Turner	(England) Manchester United	
15 July 2026	FW	(Norway)	Lisa Naalsund	(England) Manchester United	
16 July 2026	DF	(France)	Jade Rastocle	(France) Montpellier	
17 July 2026	DF	(Canada)	Marie Levasseur	(France) Montpellier	
23 July 2026	GK	(England)	Katie Startup	(England) Manchester City	
24 July 2026	GK	(England)	Sophie Baggaley	Unattached	
28 August 2026	MF	(Japan)	Suzu Amano	(Sweden) Växjö	

=== Loans out ===
Date	Position	Nationality	Name	To	Until	Ref.
14 July 2026	FW	(England)	Ava Baker	(England) Ipswich Town	30 June 2027	

=== Transfers out ===
Date	Position	Nationality	Name	To	Ref.
14 May 2026	GK	(England)	Poppy Irvine	(England) Norwich City	
14 May 2026	GK	(United States)	Adrianna Franch		
14 May 2026	DF	(United States)	Michaela Kovacs	(Denmark) Brøndby IF	
14 May 2026	MF	(Scotland)	Christie Harrison-Murray	(England) Burnley	
14 May 2026	MF	(Republic of Ireland)	Shanade Hopcroft	(England) Crystal Palace	
14 May 2026	MF	(Wales)	Tegan McGowan	(England) Ipswich Town	
14 May 2026	MF	(Republic of Ireland)	Lily Agg	Retired	
14 May 2026	FW	(Republic of Ireland)	Lucy Quinn	(England) Sheffield United	

== Women's Super League ==
=== League table ===
Pos	Team	Pld	W	D	L	GF	GA	GD	Pts	Qualification or relegation
10	West Ham United	10	4	0	6	11	19	−8	12	
11	Brighton & Hove Albion	10	3	2	5	16	16	0	11	
12	Crystal Palace	11	2	3	6	12	27	−15	9	
13	Birmingham City	10	1	3	6	11	22	−11	6	Qualification for WSL2 promotion/relegation play-off
14	Charlton Athletic	10	0	0	10	5	30	−25	0	Relegation to the WSL2

Updated to match(es) played on 21 November 2026. Source: Women's Super League Table
Rules for classification: 1) Points; 2) Goal difference; 3) Number of goals scored.

=== Matches ===
The league schedule was released on 30 July 2026.

6 September 2026 1	Manchester City	3–1	Birmingham City	Sportcity
14:30 BST	Fowler 49'; Shaw 55', 86'; Mead (yellow card) 83'	Report	Hurtré 90'; Effa Effa (yellow card) 90+3'	Stadium: Academy Stadium; Referee: Phoebe Cross

13 September 2026 2	Birmingham City	2–2	Brighton & Hove Albion	Bordesley
14:00 BST	Hurtré 8'; Crosthwaite 51'; Leidhammar (yellow card) 68'		Seike (yellow card) 74', (goal) 90+5'; García 77'; Haley (yellow card) 90+3'	Stadium: St Andrew's; Attendance: 1,405; Referee: Sophie Dennington

19 September 2026 3	Chelsea	2–0	Birmingham City	Fulham
12:45 BST	Potter 8'; Malard 71'; Walsh (yellow card) 90+1'	Report		Stadium: Stamford Bridge; Referee: Alice Parker

27 September 2026 4	Birmingham City	3–3	Crystal Palace	Bordesley
14:00 BST	Hurtré 1', 33'; Amano 87'	Report	Hopcroft 30'; England 70'; Lloyd-Smith 77'	Stadium: St Andrew's; Attendance: 1,627; Referee: Amy Fearn

4 October 2026 5	Everton	2–1	Birmingham City	Liverpool
14:00 BST	Mace 12', 72'; McNamara (yellow card) 90+4'	Report	Hurtré 15'	Stadium: Goodison Park; Attendance: 2,026; Referee: William Davis

18 October 2026 6	Arsenal	1–1	Birmingham City	Holloway
12:30 GMT	Smith 66'; Stanway (yellow card) 70'		Hurtré 53'; Herron (yellow card) 72'	Stadium: Emirates Stadium; Attendance: 19,426; Referee: Stephen Parkinson

25 October 2026 7	Birmingham City	1–0	Charlton Athletic	Bordesley
14:00 GMT	Miyagawa (yellow card) 47'; Leidhammar 68'	Report		Stadium: St Andrew's; Referee: Megan Wilson

1 November 2026 8	Birmingham City	1–4	Tottenham Hotspur	Bordesley
14:00 GMT	Hurtré (yellow card) 36'; Naalsund (yellow card) 49'; Herron 64'	Report	Vinberg (yellow card) 30'; Blakstad 37'; Pelova (yellow card) 45', (goal) 84'; Holdt 50'; Gaupset 53'; Dijkstra (yellow card) 69'	Stadium: St Andrew's; Referee: Kirsty Dowle

8 November 2026 9	London City Lionesses	4–1	Birmingham City	Bromley
14:30 GMT	Pattinson 10'; Cascarino 16' (yellow card) 27'; Pérez (yellow card) 37'; Geyoro 74'; Arques (yellow card) 81'; Diani 90+2'	Report	Hurtré 50'; Herron (yellow card) 72'	Stadium: Hayes Lane; Referee: Phoebe Cross

15 November 2026 10	Aston Villa	1–0	Birmingham City	Birmingham
14:00 GMT	Harviken 76'; Deslandes (yellow card) 90+3' (red card) 90+3'	Report	Naalsund (yellow card) 74'	Stadium: Villa Park; Attendance: 5,672; Referee: Lisa Benn

22 November 2026 11	Birmingham City	1–2	Manchester United	Bordesley
12:00 GMT	Lee Geum-min 4'; Holloway (yellow card) 83'	Report	Terland 80'; Awujo 90+4'	Stadium: St Andrew's; Referee: Stacey Pearson

13 December 2026 12	Birmingham City	v	Liverpool	Birmingham
14:00 UTC				Stadium: St Andrew's

20 December 2026 13	West Ham United	v	Birmingham City	Dagenham
				Stadium: Victoria Road

10 January 2027 14	Charlton Athletic	v	Birmingham City	Charlton
				Stadium: The Valley

20 January 2027 15	Birmingham City	v	Manchester City	Bordesley
				Stadium: St Andrew's

24 January 2027 16	Brighton & Hove Albion	v	Birmingham City	Crawley
				Stadium: Broadfield Stadium

31 January 2027 17	Birmingham City	v	Aston Villa	Bordesley
				Stadium: St Andrew's

7 February 2027 18	Birmingham City	v	Arsenal	Bordesley
14:00 BST				Stadium: St Andrew's

14 February 2027 19	Liverpool	v	Birmingham City	St Helens
14:00 UTC				Stadium: St Helens Stadium

13 March 2027 20	Birmingham City	v	Chelsea	Bordesley
				Stadium: St Andrew's

17 March 2027 21	Crystal Palace	v	Birmingham City	Sutton
				Stadium: Gander Green Lane

28 March 2027 22	Birmingham City	v	London City Lionesses	Bordesley
				Stadium: St Andrew's

4 April 2027 23	Birmingham City	v	West Ham United	Bordesley
				Stadium: St Andrew's

2 May 2027 24	Manchester United	v	Birmingham City	Leigh
				Stadium: Leigh Sports Village

9 May 2027 25	Birmingham City	v	Everton	Bordesley
				Stadium: St Andrew's

22 May 2027 26	Tottenham Hotspur	v	Birmingham City	Leyton
				Stadium: Brisbane Road

== Women's FA Cup ==
As a member of the first tier, Birmingham City entered the FA Cup in the fourth round proper.

== WSL Players Cup ==
Pos	Grp	Team	Pld	W	PW	PL	L	GF	GA	GD	Pts	Qualification
8	NR	Aston Villa	5	3	1	0	1	9	6	+3	11	Advance to Knockout Phase
9	SR	Crystal Palace	5	2	1	0	2	9	8	+1	8	
10	NR	Birmingham City	5	2	0	1	2	12	8	+4	7	
11	NR	Sunderland	4	2	0	0	2	5	7	−2	6	
12	SR	Charlton Athletic	5	2	0	0	3	4	9	−5	6	

Updated to match(es) played on 18 November 2026. Source: WSL Football
Rules for classification: 1) Points; 2) Goal difference; 3) Number of goals scored; 4) Number of wins; 5) Head-to-head record

23 September 2026 1	Everton	2–0	Birmingham City	Walton
19:00	Kramžar 17'; Ishikawa (yellow card) 32'; Momiki 55'	Report	Rastocle (yellow card) 71'	Stadium: Goodison Park; Attendance: 1,096; Referee: Adewunmi Soneye

30 September 2026 2	Birmingham City	3–4	Liverpool	Bordesley
19:00 BST	Levasseur 34'; Lee Geum-min 50'; Leidhammer 76'	Report	Höbinger 4', 54'; McDonald 51'; Ramos 90+3'	Stadium: St Andrew's; Attendance: 610; Referee: Julia Kings

21 October 2026 3	Durham	0–5	Birmingham City	South Shields
19:00	Collinson (yellow card) 58'	Report	Sarri 29', 90'; Leidhammar 34'; Cornet 78'; Crosthwaite 80'	Stadium: First Cloud Arena; Referee: Adewunmi Soneye

28 October 2026 4	Aston Villa	1–1 (6–5 p)	Birmingham City	Hednesford
19:30 GMT	Harviken 69'	Report	Levasseur (yellow card) 88'; Harris 90+4'	Stadium: Keys Park; Attendance: 1,548; Referee: Melissa Burgin
	Penalties
	Jean-François (penalty scored); Deslandes (penalty scored); Maltby (penalty missed); Kendall (penalty scored); Harviken (penalty scored); Taylor (penalty scored); Grant (penalty scored)		(penalty scored) Hurtré; (penalty scored) Lee; (penalty missed) Sarri; (penalty scored) Cooke; (penalty scored) Harris; (penalty scored) Herron; (penalty missed) Miyagawa

11 November 2026	Birmingham City	v	Sunderland	Bordesley
19:00 GMT		Report		Stadium: St Andrew's

16 December 2026	Birmingham City	v	Nottingham Forest	Bordesley
19:00 GMT		Report		Stadium: St Andrew's

== Statistics ==
As of match played 27 September 2026

=== Appearances ===
No.	Pos	Nat	Player	Total		Women's Super League		FA Cup		WSL Players Cup	
No.	Pos	Nat	Player	Apps	Goals	Apps	Goals	Apps	Goals	Apps	Goals
1	GK	(England) ENG	Lucy Thomas	1	0	0+0	0	0+0	0	1+0	0
2	DF	(England) ENG	Martha Harris	1	0	0+0	0	0+0	0	1+0	0
3	DF	(Canada) CAN	Marie Levasseur	5	0	4+0	0	0+0	0	0+1	0
4	DF	(France) FRA	Jade Rastocle	1	0	0+0	0	0+0	0	0+1	0
6	DF	(England) ENG	Shannon Cooke	2	0	1+0	0	0+0	0	1+0	0
7	FW	(South Korea) KOR	Lee Geum-min	4	0	4+0	0	0+0	0	0+0	0
8	MF	(Norway) NOR	Lisa Naalsund	5	0	4+0	0	0+0	0	0+1	0
9	FW	(Northern Ireland) NIR	Simone Magill	0	0	0+0	0	0+0	0	0+0	0
10	MF	(Sweden) SWE	Wilma Leidhammar	4	0	2+1	0	0+0	0	1+0	0
14	MF	(Japan) JPN	Suzu Amano	3	1	0+2	1	0+0	0	1+0	0
15	DF	(Northern Ireland) NIR	Rebecca Holloway	2	0	0+1	0	0+0	0	1+0	0
16	FW	(England) ENG	Lily Crosthwaite	5	1	4+0	1	0+0	0	1+0	0
18	DF	(Northern Ireland) NIR	Rebecca McKenna	5	0	4+0	0	0+0	0	1+0	0
19	MF	(Scotland) SCO	Chelsea Cornet	3	0	0+2	0	0+0	0	1+0	0
20	FW	(France) FRA	Chancelle Effa Effa	4	0	0+3	0	0+0	0	1+0	0
21	DF	(England) ENG	Millie Turner	4	0	3+0	0	0+0	0	1+0	0
22	FW	(France) FRA	Océane Hurtré	5	4	4+0	4	0+0	0	1+0	0
23	GK	(England) ENG	Sophie Baggaley	4	0	4+0	0	0+0	0	0+0	0
26	MF	(Japan) JPN	Asato Miyagawa	4	0	3+1	0	0+0	0	0+0	0
27	MF	(Greece) GRE	Veatriki Sarri	4	0	3+0	0	0+0	0	1+0	0
30	DF	(England) ENG	Neve Herron	4	0	4+0	0	0+0	0	0+0	0
40	GK	(England) ENG	Katie Startup	0	0	0+0	0	0+0	0	0+0	0

=== Goals ===
Rank	Pos.	No.	Player	Women's Super League	FA Cup	WSL Players Cup	Total
1	FW	22	(France) Océane Hurtré	4	0	0	4
2	MF	14	(Japan) Suzu Amano	1	0	0	1
2	FW	22	(England) Lily Crosthwaite	1	0	0	1
Total				6	0	0	6

=== Disciplinary record ===
No.	Pos.	Player	Women's Super League			FA Cup			WSL Players Cup			Total		
No.	Pos.	Player	Yellow card	(yellow card) (yellow-red card)	Red card	Yellow card	(yellow card) (yellow-red card)	Red card	Yellow card	(yellow card) (yellow-red card)	Red card	Yellow card	(yellow card) (yellow-red card)	Red card
4	DF	(France) Jade Rastocle	0	0	0	0	0	0	1	0	0	1	0	0
10	FW	(Sweden) Wilma Leidhammar	1	0	0	0	0	0	0	0	0	1	0	0
20	FW	(France) Chancelle Effa Effa	1	0	0	0	0	0	0	0	0	1	0	0
22	FW	(France) Océane Hurtré	1	0	0	0	0	0	0	0	0	1	0	0
Total			3	0	0	0	0	0	1	0	0	4	0	0
