= 2023–24 West Ham United F.C. Women season =

West Ham United
2023–24 season
- Head Coach: Rehanne Skinner
- Stadium: Victoria Road, Dagenham
- WSL: 11th
- FA Cup: Fourth round
- League Cup: Group stage
- Top goalscorer: League: Viviane Asseyi and Riko Ueki (6); All: Viviane Asseyi and Riko Ueki (7)
- Highest home attendance: 4,172 (vs. Arsenal, 4 February)
- Lowest home attendance: 614 (vs. Everton, 10 December)
- Average home league attendance: 1,897
Home colours	Away colours	Third colours

The 2023–24 West Ham United F.C. Women season was the club's 33rd season in existence and their sixth in the Women's Super League, the highest level of the football pyramid. Along with competing in the WSL, the club also contested two domestic cup competitions: the FA Cup and the League Cup.

On 28 May 2023, following the final game of the 2022–23 season, it was announced head coach Paul Konchesky had been sacked with immediate effect after one season in charge. On 20 July 2023, the club announced Rehanne Skinner as head coach. Skinner had most recently been head coach of Tottenham Hotspur but was sacked in March 2023.

== Squad ==
As of 31 January 2024

Note: Flags indicate national team as defined under FIFA eligibility rules; some limited exceptions apply. Players may hold more than one non-FIFA nationality.

No.	Pos.	Nation	Player
1	GK	AUS	Mackenzie Arnold (captain)
2	DF	SCO	Kirsty Smith
3	DF	JPN	Risa Shimizu
4	MF	ENG	Abbey-Leigh Stringer
5	DF	BEL	Amber Tysiak
7	MF	SWE	Marika Bergman-Lundin
8	MF	DEN	Emma Snerle
9	FW	JPN	Riko Ueki
10	MF	ISL	Dagný Brynjarsdóttir
12	FW	ENG	Emma Harries
14	DF	CAN	Shelina Zadorsky (on loan from Tottenham Hotspur)
15	MF	USA	Kristie Mewis

No.	Pos.	Nation	Player
16	MF	IRL	Jessica Ziu
18	DF	ENG	Anouk Denton
19	MF	JPN	Honoka Hayashi
20	FW	FRA	Viviane Asseyi
21	DF	ENG	Shannon Cooke
22	MF	AUS	Katrina Gorry
23	DF	FRA	Hawa Cissoko (vice captain)
25	GK	IRL	Megan Walsh
30	GK	ENG	Katie O'Hanlon
35	FW	ENG	Princess Ademiluyi
36	MF	ENG	Soraya Walsh

== Preseason ==
20 August 2023 Friendly	Lewes	1–2	West Ham United	Lewes
	Grey	Report	Evans; Filis (pen.)	Stadium: The Dripping Pan

10 September 2023 Friendly	West Ham United	3–0	Bristol City	Dagenham
	Asseyi 58', 63', 90'			Stadium: Victoria Road

== Women's Super League ==
=== Results summary ===
Overall								Home						Away					
Pld	W	D	L	GF	GA	GD	Pts	W	D	L	GF	GA	GD	W	D	L	GF	GA	GD
22	3	6	13	20	45	−25	15	1	4	6	12	19	−7	2	2	7	8	26	−18

Last updated: 18 May 2024.
Source: WSL

=== Results by matchday ===
Round	1	2	3	4	5	6	7	8	9	10	11	12	13	14	15	16	17	18	19	20	21	22
Ground	H	A	A	H	H	A	H	A	H	A	H	A	H	A	H	A	H	H	A	A	H	A
Result	L	W	L	D	L	L	L	L	L	D	L	W	W	L	D	L	L	D	L	D	D	L
Position	12	7	9	8	8	9	11	11	12	11	11	11	9	10	11	11	11	11	11	11	11	11

A = Away; H = Home; W = Win; D = Draw; L = Loss

=== Results ===
1 October 2023 1	West Ham United	0–2	Manchester City	Dagenham
15:00	Cissoko (yellow card) 90+5'	Report	Castellanos (yellow card) 16'; Hemp 48'; Roord 55'; Ouahabi (red card) 71'	Stadium: Victoria Road; Attendance: 2,032; Referee: Abigail Bryne

8 October 2023 2	Brighton & Hove Albion	0–2	West Ham United	Crawley
12:00	Thorisdottir (yellow card) 24'; Bergsvand (yellow card) 65'	Report	Smith 12'; Ueki (yellow card) 24', (goal) 51'; Asseyi (yellow card) 38'; Evans (yellow card) 75'; Atkinson (yellow card) 89'; Shimizu (yellow card) 90+1'	Stadium: Broadfield Stadium; Attendance: 1,126; Referee: Amy Fearn

14 October 2023 3	Chelsea	2–0	West Ham United	Kingston upon Thames
17:30	Leupolz (yellow card) 18'; Kerr 36'; Cuthbert 90'	Report	Cissoko (yellow card) 34'	Stadium: Kingsmeadow; Attendance: 3,313; Referee: Stacey Pearson

22 October 2023 4	West Ham United	1–1	Liverpool	Dagenham
15:00	Ueki (yellow card) 38', (goal) 90+5'	Report	Höbinger 52'; Bonner (yellow card) 73'	Stadium: Victoria Road; Attendance: 1,163; Referee: Steven Hughes

5 November 2023 5	West Ham United	2–3	Bristol City	Dagenham
15:00	Asseyi 27' (pen.); Ueki 45+3'	Report	Napier (yellow card) 5'; Furness (yellow card) 17'; Thestrup 32'; Powell 37'; Aspin 55'; Harrison (yellow card) 80'; Connolly (yellow card) 90+2'	Stadium: Victoria Road; Attendance: 791; Referee: Kirsty Dowle

12 November 2023 6	Manchester United	5–0	West Ham United	Leigh
12:00	Geyse 3'; Turner 42'; Parris 45+1'; García 88'; Malard 90'	Report	Tysiak (yellow card) 21'; Denton (yellow card) 59'; Cissoko (yellow card) 80'	Stadium: Leigh Sports Village; Attendance: 4,396; Referee: Phoebe Cross

19 November 2023 7	West Ham United	2–3	Aston Villa	Dagenham
15:00	Asseyi 27' (pen.); Stringer (yellow card) 39'; Filis (yellow card) 49'; Evans 80'; Cooke (yellow card) 85'	Report	Mayling (yellow card) 21'; Patten 31'; Leon 50'; Daly (yellow card) 85', (goal) 90+2'; Nobbs (yellow card) 90+6'	Stadium: Victoria Road; Attendance: 1,406; Referee: Keith Stroud

26 November 2023 8	Arsenal	3–0	West Ham United	Borehamwood
14:00	Maanum 2'; Mead 18', 41'	Report	Cissoko (yellow card) 37'	Stadium: Meadow Park; Attendance: 3,686; Referee: Lisa Benn

10 December 2023 9	West Ham United	0–1	Everton	Dagenham
15:00	Asseyi (yellow card) 53'	Report	Finnigann (yellow card) 34'; K. Holmgaard 63'	Stadium: Victoria Road; Attendance: 614; Referee: Adewunmi Soneye

17 December 2023 10	Leicester City	1–1	West Ham United	Leicester
15:00	Palmer (yellow card) 28'; Petermann 68'; Green (yellow card) 90+1'	Report	Ziu (yellow card) 35'; Stringer (yellow card) 79'; Cissoko (yellow card) 90+3' (yellow-red card) 90+5'; Hayashi 90+8'	Stadium: King Power Stadium; Attendance: 1,521; Referee: Abigail Byrne

21 January 2024 11	West Ham United	3–4	Tottenham Hotspur	Dagenham
19:00	Ueki (yellow card) 21'; Cissoko (yellow card) 29'; Shimizu 35'; Gorry (yellow card) 42'; Asseyi 62', (yellow card) 87'; Tysiak 70'	Report	Clinton 6', 48'; Bizet 43'; Naz 75'; Bartip (yellow card) 84'	Stadium: Victoria Road; Attendance: 1,293; Referee: Stacey Pearson

28 January 2024 12	Bristol City	1–2	West Ham United	Bristol
14:00	Connolly (yellow card) 46'; Thestrup 48'; Powell (yellow card) 90+8'	Report	Hayashi 13'; Harries (yellow card) 23'; Asseyi 55'; Shimizu (yellow card) 90+5'; Smith (yellow card) 90+14'	Stadium: Ashton Gate; Attendance: 6,214; Referee: Lauren Impey

4 February 2024 13	West Ham United	2–1	Arsenal	Dagenham
12:30	Asseyi 50' (pen.), (yellow card) 90+6'; Cissoko 58'; Smith (yellow card) 78'; Cooke (yellow card) 86'	Report	Russo 43'; Lacasse (yellow card) 88'	Stadium: Victoria Road; Attendance: 4,172; Referee: Melissa Burgin

18 February 2024 14	Everton	2–0	West Ham United	Liverpool
13:00	Finnigan (yellow card) 58'; Piemonte 83'; Galli 86'; Stenevik (yellow card) 90+3'; Olesen (yellow card) 90+5'	Report		Stadium: Walton Hall Park; Attendance: 997; Referee: Anthony Backhouse

3 March 2024 15	West Ham United	1–1	Manchester United	Dagenham
15:00	Asseyi 85'; Snerle (yellow card) 87'	Report	Williams 4'	Stadium: Victoria Road; Attendance: 3,171; Referee: Melissa Burgin

17 March 2024 16	Liverpool	3–1	West Ham United	Birkenhead
12:00	Kiernan 41'; Kearns 50'; Haug 73'; Clark (yellow card) 85'; Daniëls (yellow card) 90+4'	Report	Ueki 87'	Stadium: Prenton Park; Attendance: 1,397; Referee: Emily Heaslip

24 March 2024 17	West Ham United	0–2	Chelsea	Dagenham
16:30	Bergman-Lundin (yellow card) 64'	Report	Beever-Jones 2'; Leupolz (yellow card) 72'; Cuthbert 88'	Stadium: Victoria Road; Attendance: 2,555; Referee: Marc Wilson

31 March 2024 18	West Ham United	0–0	Brighton & Hove Albion	Dagenham
15:00	Ueki (yellow card) 69'	Report	Losada (yellow card) 31'; Olme (yellow card) 34'; Haley (yellow card) 64'; Symonds (yellow card) 89'	Stadium: Victoria Road; Attendance: 1,769; Referee: Kirsty Dowle

21 April 2024 19	Manchester City	5–0	West Ham United	Manchester
14:15	Ouahabi 1'; Shaw 3', 24'; Greenwood (yellow card) 74'; Blindkilde 81'; Park 86'	Report	Shimizu (yellow card) 59'; Cissoko (yellow card) 84'	Stadium: Academy Stadium; Attendance: 4,385; Referee: Abigail Byrne

28 April 2024 20	Aston Villa	1–1	West Ham United	Walsall
14:00	Patten (yellow card) 64'; Lehmann 72'; Dali (yellow card) 90+4'; Turner (yellow card) 90+6'	Report	Smith (yellow card) 27'; Cooke 90+5'	Stadium: Bescot Stadium; Attendance: 4,282; Referee: Emily Heaslip

5 May 2024 21	West Ham United	1–1	Leicester City	Dagenham
15:00	Ueki 13'; Tysiak (yellow card) 90+5'	Report	Howard 36'; Ale (yellow card) 47'; Thibaud (yellow card) 87'	Stadium: Victoria Road; Attendance: 1,904; Referee: Abigail Byrne

18 May 2024 22	Tottenham Hotspur	3–1	West Ham United	Leyton
15:00	England 4'; Ahtinen (yellow card) 60'; Naz 86'; Grant (yellow card) 90+8'; Spence 90+9'	Report	Ueki 50'; Smith (yellow card) 54'	Stadium: Brisbane Road; Attendance: 9,999; Referee: Phoebe Cross

=== League table ===
Pos	Team	Pld	W	D	L	GF	GA	GD	Pts	Qualification or relegation
8	Everton	22	6	5	11	24	37	−13	23	
9	Brighton & Hove Albion	22	5	4	13	26	48	−22	19	
10	Leicester City	22	4	6	12	26	45	−19	18	
11	West Ham United	22	3	6	13	20	45	−25	15	
12	Bristol City (R)	22	1	3	18	20	70	−50	6	Relegation to the Championship

Source: Women's Super League Table
Rules for classification: 1) Points; 2) Goal difference; 3) Number of goals scored.
(R) Relegated

== Women's FA Cup ==
As a member of the first tier, West Ham entered the FA Cup in the fourth round proper.

14 January 2024 Fourth round	Chelsea	3–1 (a.e.t.)	West Ham United	Kingston upon Thames
13:00	Fishel 70'; Reiten (yellow card) 86'; Cuthbert 101'; Nüsken 105+2', (yellow card) 108'	Report	Tysiak (yellow card) 12'; Asseyi 18'; Shimizu (yellow card) 44'; Arnold (yellow card) 68'; Gorry (yellow card) 72'	Stadium: Kingsmeadow; Attendance: 2,824; Referee: Emily Heaslip

== FA Women's League Cup ==
11 October 2023 Group stage	West Ham United	2–1	Charlton Athletic	Dagenham
19:30	Harries 58'; Atkinson 78', (yellow card) 90+2'	Report	Humphrey 20'; Muya (yellow card) 77'	Stadium: Victoria Road; Attendance: 413; Referee: Lauren Impey

22 November 2023 Group stage	Brighton & Hove Albion	3–1	West Ham United	Crawley
19:30	Thorisdottir (yellow card) 28'; Bergsvan 45+1'; Losada 52' (pen.); Sarri 61' (pen.); Pattinson (yellow card) 64'	Report	Stapleton (yellow card) 23'; Asseyi (yellow card) 28'; Stringer (yellow card) 44'; Cooke (yellow card) 51'; Cissoko 89'	Stadium: Broadfield Stadium; Attendance: 845; Referee: Amy Fearn

25 January 2024 Group stage	Birmingham City	2–1	West Ham United	Birmingham
19:00	Agg 18'; Harris 48', (yellow card) 90+7'; Choe (yellow card) 67'	Report	Ueki 90+2'	Stadium: St Andrew's; Attendance: 781; Referee: Amy Fearn

Pos	Team	Pld	W	PW	PL	L	GF	GA	GD	Pts	Qualification	BHA	CHA	WHU	BIR
1	Brighton & Hove Albion (Q)	3	3	0	0	0	8	2	+6	9	Advanced to knock-out stage	—	–	3–1	–
2	Charlton Athletic	3	1	0	0	2	3	4	−1	3	Possible knock-out stage based on ranking	1–2	—	–	1–0
3	West Ham United	3	1	0	0	2	4	6	−2	3		–	2–1	—	–
4	Birmingham City	3	1	0	0	2	2	5	−3	3		0–3	–	2–1	—

Source: FA Women's League Cup
Rules for classification: 1) Points; 2) Goal difference; 3) Number of goals scored; 4) Number of wins; 5) Head-to-head record
(Q) Qualified to the phase indicated

== Squad statistics ==
=== Appearances ===
As of match played 18 May 2024

Starting appearances are listed first, followed by substitute appearances after the + symbol where applicable.

No.	Pos	Nat	Player	Total		WSL		FA Cup		League Cup	
No.	Pos	Nat	Player	Apps	Goals	Apps	Goals	Apps	Goals	Apps	Goals
1	GK	(Australia) AUS	Mackenzie Arnold	21	0	19	0	1	0	1	0
2	DF	(Scotland) SCO	Kirsty Smith	25	1	22	1	1	0	2	0
3	DF	(Japan) JPN	Risa Shimizu	26	1	22	1	1	0	3	0
4	MF	(England) ENG	Abbey-Leigh Stringer	11	0	7+1	0	0	0	2+1	0
5	DF	(Belgium) BEL	Amber Tysiak	20	1	16+1	1	1	0	1+1	0
7	MF	(Sweden) SWE	Marika Bergman-Lundin	8	0	0+8	0	0	0	0	0
8	MF	(Denmark) DEN	Emma Snerle	13	0	5+6	0	1	0	1	0
9	FW	(Japan) JPN	Riko Ueki	26	7	22	6	1	0	1+2	1
10	MF	(Iceland) ISL	Dagný Brynjarsdóttir	0	0	0	0	0	0	0	0
12	FW	(England) ENG	Emma Harries	20	1	7+10	0	0+1	0	1+1	1
14	DF	(Canada) CAN	Shelina Zadorsky	10	0	8+1	0	1	0	0	0
15	MF	(United States) USA	Kristie Mewis	3	0	0+3	0	0	0	0	0
16	MF	(Republic of Ireland) IRL	Jessica Ziu	19	0	11+5	0	0+1	0	0+2	0
18	DF	(England) ENG	Anouk Denton	19	0	12+3	0	0+1	0	3	0
19	MF	(Japan) JPN	Honoka Hayashi	23	2	21	2	1	0	1	0
20	FW	(France) FRA	Viviane Asseyi	26	7	22	6	1	1	3	0
21	DF	(England) ENG	Shannon Cooke	23	1	8+11	1	1	0	3	0
22	MF	(Australia) AUS	Katrina Gorry	8	0	7	0	1	0	0	0
23	DF	(France) FRA	Hawa Cissoko	23	2	19+1	1	0	0	2+1	1
25	GK	(Republic of Ireland) IRL	Megan Walsh	5	0	3	0	0	0	2	0
30	GK	(England) ENG	Katie O'Hanlon	0	0	0	0	0	0	0	0
35	FW	(England) ENG	Princess Ademiluyi	15	0	0+11	0	0+1	0	2+1	0
36	MF	(England) ENG	Soraya Walsh	0	0	0	0	0	0	0	0
Players away from the club on loan:
17	MF	(England) ENG	Mel Filis	11	0	2+7	0	0	0	1+1	0
24	DF	(Republic of Ireland) IRL	Jessie Stapleton	2	0	0+1	0	0	0	1	0
41	MF	(England) ENG	Keira Flannery	4	0	0+2	0	0	0	2	0
Players who appeared for the club but left during the season:
7	MF	(Scotland) SCO	Lisa Evans	11	1	8+1	1	0	0	0+2	0
11	MF	(Republic of Ireland) IRL	Izzy Atkinson	9	1	1+6	0	0	0	1+1	1

== Transfers ==
=== Transfers in ===
Date	Position	Nationality	Name	From	Ref.
28 July 2023	DF	(Republic of Ireland)	Jessie Stapleton	(Republic of Ireland) Shelbourne	
2 August 2023	FW	(England)	Emma Harries	(England) Reading	
11 August 2023	GK	(United States)	Katelin Talbert	(Portugal) Benfica	
18 August 2023	GK	(Republic of Ireland)	Megan Walsh	(England) Brighton & Hove Albion	
12 September 2023	FW	(Japan)	Riko Ueki	(Japan) Tokyo Verdy Beleza	
1 January 2024	MF	(United States)	Kristie Mewis	(United States) Gotham FC	
5 January 2024	MF	(Australia)	Katrina Gorry	(Sweden) Vittsjö GIK	
31 January 2024	MF	(Sweden)	Marika Bergman-Lundin	(Sweden) BK Häcken	

=== Loans in ===
Date	Position	Nationality	Name	From	Until	Ref.
3 January 2024	DF	(Canada)	Shelina Zadorsky	(England) Tottenham Hotspur	End of season	

=== Transfers out ===
Date	Position	Nationality	Name	To	Ref.
28 May 2023	MF	(England)	Kate Longhurst	(England) Charlton Athletic	
29 June 2023	DF	(England)	Grace Fisk	(England) Liverpool	
29 June 2023	DF	(England)	Lucy Parker	(England) Aston Villa	
29 June 2023	MF	(England)	Brooke Cairns	(England) Wolverhampton Wanderers	
29 June 2023	GK	(England)	Sophie Hillyerd	(England) London City Lionesses	
7 July 2023	DF	(England)	Maisy Barker	(England) Ipswich Town	
25 January 2024	MF	(Scotland)	Lisa Evans	(England) Bristol City	
27 January 2024	MF	(Republic of Ireland)	Izzy Atkinson	(England) Crystal Palace	

=== Loans out ===
Date	Position	Nationality	Name	To	Until	Ref.
11 August 2023	GK	(United States)	Katelin Talbert	(Sweden) Djurgården	End of season	
16 August 2023	MF	(England)	Macey Nicholls (Note: Dual registration)	(England) Hashtag United	End of season	
7 September 2023	MF	(England)	Halle Houssein	(England) Reading	End of season	
28 September 2023	GK	(England)	Katie O'Hanlon	(England) Billericay Town	End of season	
28 September 2023	MF	(England)	Soraya Walsh	(England) Billericay Town	End of season	
10 January 2024	MF	(England)	Mel Filis	(England) Charlton Athletic	End of season	
26 January 2024	DF	(Republic of Ireland)	Jessie Stapleton	(England) Reading	End of season	
31 January 2024	MF	(England)	Keira Flannery	(England) Reading	End of season	
