= Anouk Denton =

English footballer (born 2003)

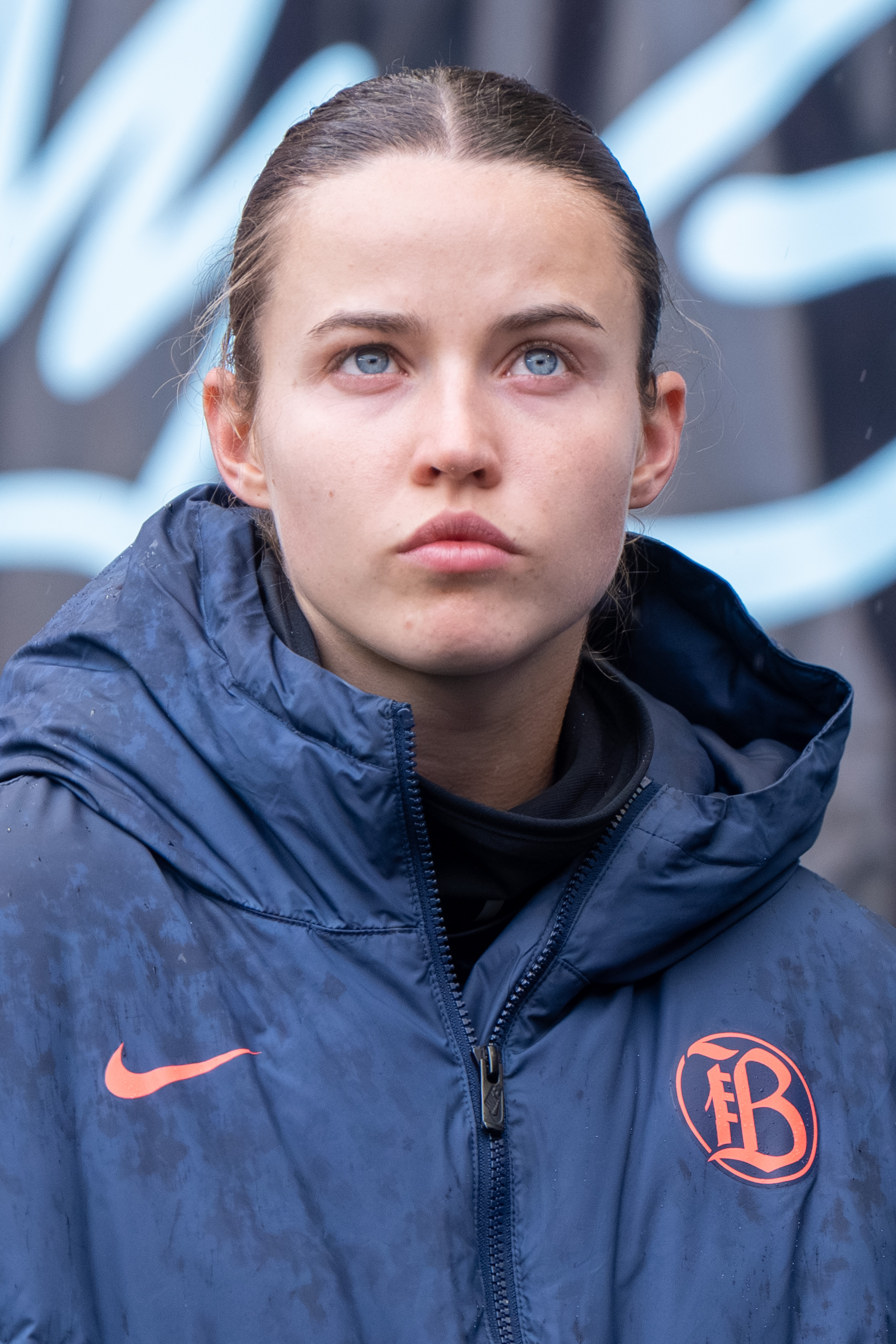
- Denton with Bay FC in 2026

Personal information
- Full name: Anouk Stephanie Denton
- Date of birth: 9 May 2003 (age 23)
- Place of birth: St. Albans, Hertfordshire, England
- Height: 1.63 m (5 ft 4 in)
- Position: Full-back

Team information
- Current team: Bay FC
- Number: 25

Youth career
- 2011–2016: St Albans City
- 2016–2020: Arsenal

College career
Years	Team	Apps	(Gls)
2021–2022	Louisville Cardinals	28	(2)

Senior career*
Years	Team	Apps	(Gls)
2020–2021	Arsenal	1	(0)
2021	→ West Ham United (loan)	3	(0)
2023–2026	West Ham United	53	(3)
2026–	Bay FC	8	(0)

International career^{‡}
2019	England U17	2	(0)
2022	England U19	7	(0)
2022–	England U23	10	(0)
2025–	England	1	(0)
- * Club domestic league appearances and goals as of 05:03, 2 November 2026 (UTC) ‡ National team caps and goals as of 15:16, 3 January 2026 (UTC)

Anouk Stephanie Denton (/əˈnuːk/; born 9 May 2003) is an English professional footballer who plays as a full-back for Bay FC of the National Women's Soccer League (NWSL) and the England national team. She previously played for Arsenal and West Ham United and played college soccer for the Louisville Cardinals.

== Early life ==
Born to mother Ulrike Denton, Denton played for St Albans Girls' School which occasionally had coaching from Arsenal players such as Leah Williamson. Whilst she was there, she was scouted by Arsenal. As a result, Denton joined their academy in 2016.

== Club career ==
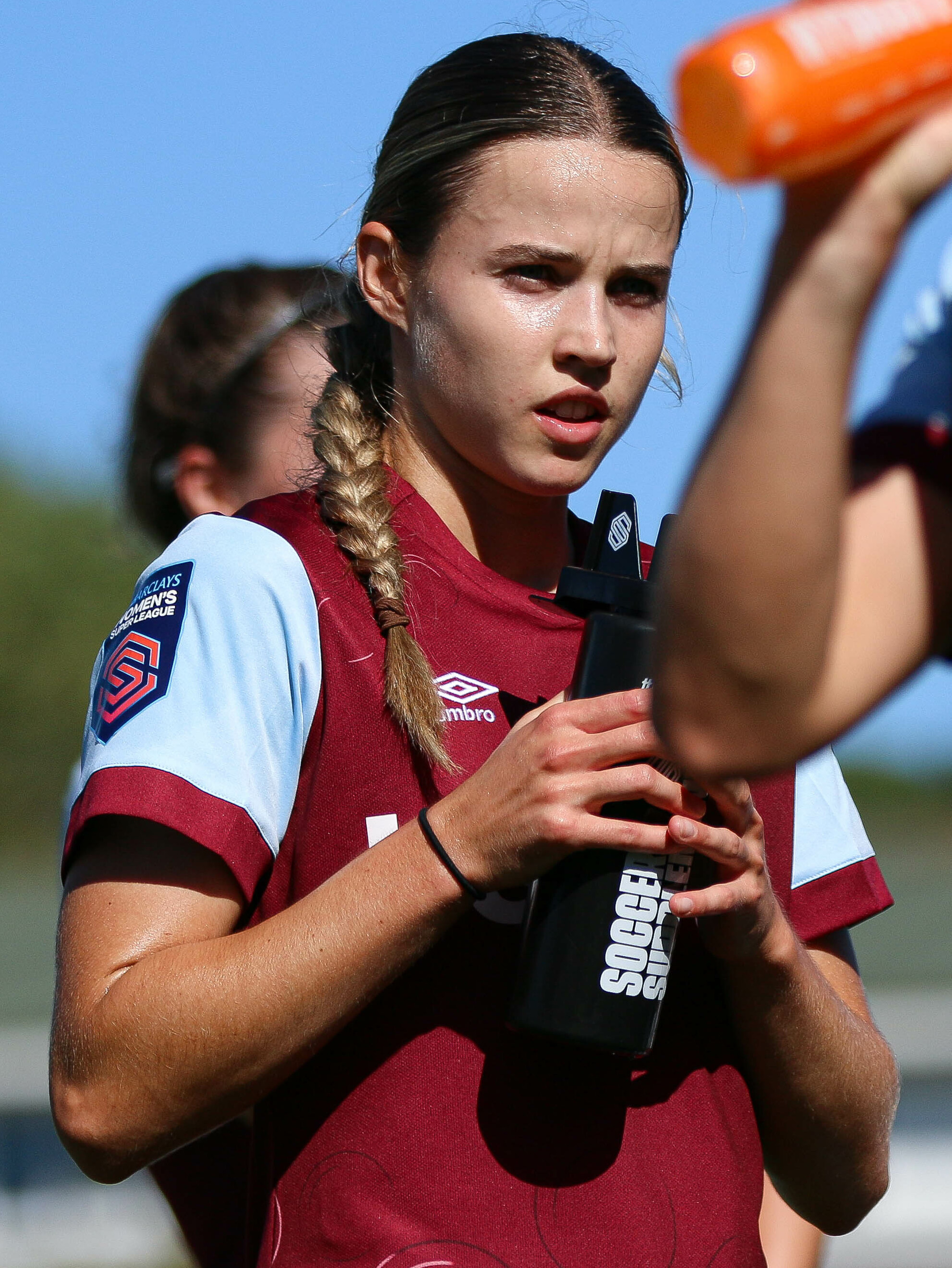
Denton with West Ham in 2023

In October 2020, due to an injury crisis at Arsenal, Denton was named on the bench for Arsenal's FA WSL match against Brighton & Hove Albion but did not play. On 18 October, she made her Arsenal debut after coming on as a substitute in the North London derby against Tottenham Hotspur at Meadow Park which Arsenal won 6–1.

In 2021, Denton joined West Ham United on a loan deal. On 18 April 2021, she scored her debut goal for West Ham in the 11–0 victory over Chichester & Selsey in the 2020–21 FA Cup fourth round. On 16 May 2021, in the fifth round of the tournament, she scored her second senior goal in a 5–1 loss to Manchester City.

In May 2021, Denton committed to the University of Louisville as part of their recruiting class of 2021. She recorded 28 appearances and 2 goals in two seasons with the Louisville Cardinals.

On 21 January 2023, it was confirmed that Denton had rejoined West Ham following a spell in the US collegiate side Louisville Cardinals. It was announced that she had signed a two-and-a-half-year deal with the London club.

On 2 February 2026, Denton joined National Women's Soccer League club Bay FC for an undisclosed fee. The move broke West Ham's club record for a transfer fee received, with the BBC reporting the fee as £200,000. Denton made her NWSL debut on 14 March 2026, coming on as a second-half substitute for Maddie Moreau in Bay FC's season-opening victory over expansion team Denver Summit FC.

== International career ==
=== Youth ===
Denton has represented England at under-17, under-19 and under-23 youth level.

In October 2019, she represented the under-17 team for 2020 U-17 European Championship qualification, starting in winning matches against Croatia and Bosnia and Herzegovina.

In April 2022, Denton featured as left-back in the starting eleven for the under-19s in the second round of 2022 U-19 Championship qualification in victories over Wales, Iceland and Belgium. In the final tournament, she again started as left-back against Norway and Germany.

On 30 September 2022, Denton was first called up to the under-23 squad for fixtures against Norway and Sweden. In February 2024, she was called up to the U23 training camp for European League fixtures, making her debut for the team on 22 February in a 3–1 defeat to Spain.

=== Senior ===
On 27 October 2025, having featured in under-23 squad against Germany a few days prior, Denton was called up to the senior England team ahead of a friendly match against Australia. SheKicks theorised that she had been called up as a replacement for Lotte Wubben-Moy noting few centre-back options within the side. Denton made her senior international debut on 2 December 2025, coming on as a second half stoppage time substitute in a 2–0 friendly win against Ghana.

== Style of play ==
According to Goal.com, as a defender Denton is able to play "both as a right-back and a left-back".

== Career statistics ==
=== Club ===
As of match played 21 December 2025

Appearances and goals by club, season and competition
Club	Season	League			National cup (Note: Includes Women's FA Cup)		League cup (Note: Includes FA Women's League Cup)		Total	
Club	Season	Division	Apps	Goals	Apps	Goals	Apps	Goals	Apps	Goals
Arsenal	2020–21	Women's Super League	1	0	0	0	0	0	1	0
West Ham United (loan)	2020–21	Women's Super League	3	0	2	2	0	0	5	2
West Ham United	2022–23	Women's Super League	5	0	0	0	1	0	6	0
West Ham United	2023–24	Women's Super League	15	0	1	0	3	0	19	0
West Ham United	2024–25	Women's Super League	20	2	1	0	2	0	23	2
West Ham United	2025–26	Women's Super League	10	1	0	0	4	0	14	1
West Ham United	Total		53	3	4	0	10	0	67	3
Career total			54	3	4	2	11	0	68	5

=== International ===
As of match played 2 December 2025

Appearances and goals by national team and year
National team	Year	Apps	Goals
England	2025	1	0
Total		1	0
