= Jade Rastocle =

French footballer (born 2004)

- Rastocle in 2025

Personal information
- Date of birth: 12 July 2004 (age 22)
- Place of birth: Stains, Seine-Saint-Denis, France
- Height: 1.68 m (5 ft 6 in)
- Position: Centre-back

Team information
- Current team: Birmingham City
- Number: 4

Youth career
- 2011–2021: AAS Sarcelles

Senior career*
Years	Team	Apps	(Gls)
2021–2024	Reims	27	(0)
2024–2026	Montpellier	41	(1)
2026–	Birmingham City	0	(0)

International career^{‡}
2020	France U17	1	(0)
2021–2023	France U19	19	(0)
2022–2024	France U20	3	(0)
2023–2025	France U23	13	(0)
- * Club domestic league appearances and goals as of 05:49, 28 July 2026 (UTC) ‡ National team caps and goals as of 05:49, 28 July 2026 (UTC)

Jade Rastocle (born 12 July 2004) is a French professional footballer who plays as a centre-back for Women's Super League club Birmingham City. She has previously been a member of Première Ligue clubs Stade de Reims and Montpellier.

== Early life ==
Rastocle was born and raised in Stains, Seine-Saint-Denis, France. In addition to football, she also spent a year of her childhood participating in judo. She joined local club AAS Sarcelles in 2011, going on to spend 10 total years with the Sarcelles academy. She played in mixed-gender teams up until the under-13 level and later became the club's under-19 squad captain. At age 14, Rastocle trialed with multiple organizations, including INSEP, but did not make it onto any team. She eventually joined the Liévin youth academy, where she trained during the weekdays before taking the train back home to play in matches for AAS Sarcelles on weekends. Rastocle often had to take two-hour train rides early in the morning to arrive to her football commitments on time.

== Club career ==
=== Stade de Reims ===
On 13 July 2021, one day after her seventeenth birthday, Rastocle signed her first professional contract with Stade de Reims. She made her Division 1 Féminine debut shortly after, participating in a game against French powerhouse Olympique Lyonnais. Rastocle ultimately spent three total seasons at Reims, earning increasing playing time each year. She only started in one of her 7 league appearances in her first season, but started in all of her matches the following year despite playing in the same number of matches. In the 2023–24 season, she appeared 13 times in Division 1 play.

=== Montpellier ===
In August 2024, Rastocle signed for Montpellier HSC. The move reunited her with France youth international teammate Maelys Mpomé. She started off at Montpellier as a substitute before gaining more minutes as time progressed. In her first year with the team, she set a career-high 19 appearances and helped contribute to Montpellier's sixth-place finish in the Première Ligue standings. She also contributed two assists and her first-ever professional goal.

In the 2025–26 season, Montpellier fared more poorly, finishing only one spot above the relegation line. Rastocle still managed to record positive defensive performances as one of the starters on the team's backline. She started in all but one of her 22 matches played. In July 2026, she departed from Montpellier.

=== Birmingham City ===
Women's Super League club Birmingham City announced, on 16 July 2026, that they had acquired Rastocle from Montpellier in exchange for an undisclosed fee ahead of the team's first season in the English top-flight in five years.

== International career ==
Rastocle has represented France at four youth international levels. After participating in trials for the under-17 national team in 2019, she debuted for the U17s in February of the following year, earning the start in a 4–3 comeback victory over Germany. At one point, she was the only under-16-aged player on the U17s. Rastocle played for the under-19 national team from 2021 to 2023. She was initially named to the French squad for the 2023 UEFA Women's Under-19 Championship, but later withdrew.

In 2024 and 2025, Rastocle contributed to title wins with the France under-20s in the Sud Ladies Cup. She also started gaining experience with the U23s while playing club football for Montpellier.

== Career statistics ==
=== Club ===
As of 30 September 2026

Appearances and goals by club, season and competition
Club	Season	League			National cup (Note: Includes Coupe de France)		League cup		Other		Total	
Club	Season	Division	Apps	Goals	Apps	Goals	Apps	Goals	Apps	Goals	Apps	Goals
Stade de Reims	2021–22	Division 1 Féminine	7	0	1	0	—		—		8	0
Stade de Reims	2022–23	Division 1 Féminine	7	0	2	0	—		—		9	0
Stade de Reims	2023–24	Division 1 Féminine	13	0	2	0	—		1 (Note: Appearances in playoffs)	0	16	0
Stade de Reims	Total		27	0	5	0	0	0	1	0	33	0
Montpellier HSC	2024–25	Première Ligue	19	1	2	0	—		—		21	1
Montpellier HSC	2025–26	Première Ligue	22	0	1	0	—		—		23	0
Montpellier HSC	Total		41	1	3	0	0	0	0	0	44	1
Birmingham City	2026–27	Women's Super League	0	0	0	0	2	0	—		2	0
Career total			68	1	8	0	2	0	1	0	79	1
