= Marta Tejedor =

Spanish football coach (born 1968)

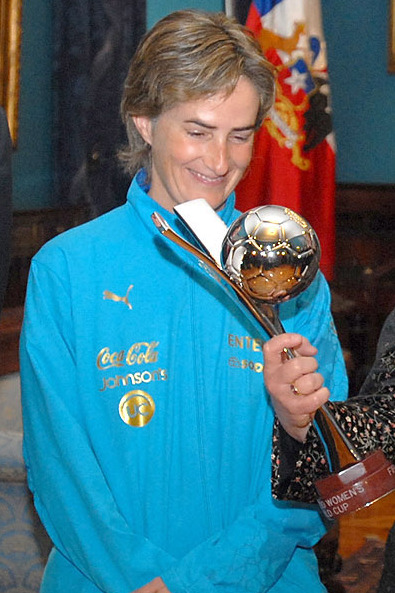

Personal information
- Full name: Marta Tejedor Munuera
- Date of birth: 23 December 1968 (age 57)
- Place of birth: Las Palmas, Spain
- Position: Midfielder

Youth career
- Years: Team
- Pomona High School

Managerial career
- 2007–2011: Chile
- 2013–2016: Peru
- 2016–2018: CD Tacón
- 2019–2020: Birmingham City

Marta Tejedor Munuera (born 23 December 1968) is a Spanish football coach who most recently managed Birmingham City of the FA Women's Super League.

She had also coached the women's national teams of Chile and Peru.
