= Shannon Cooke =

English footballer

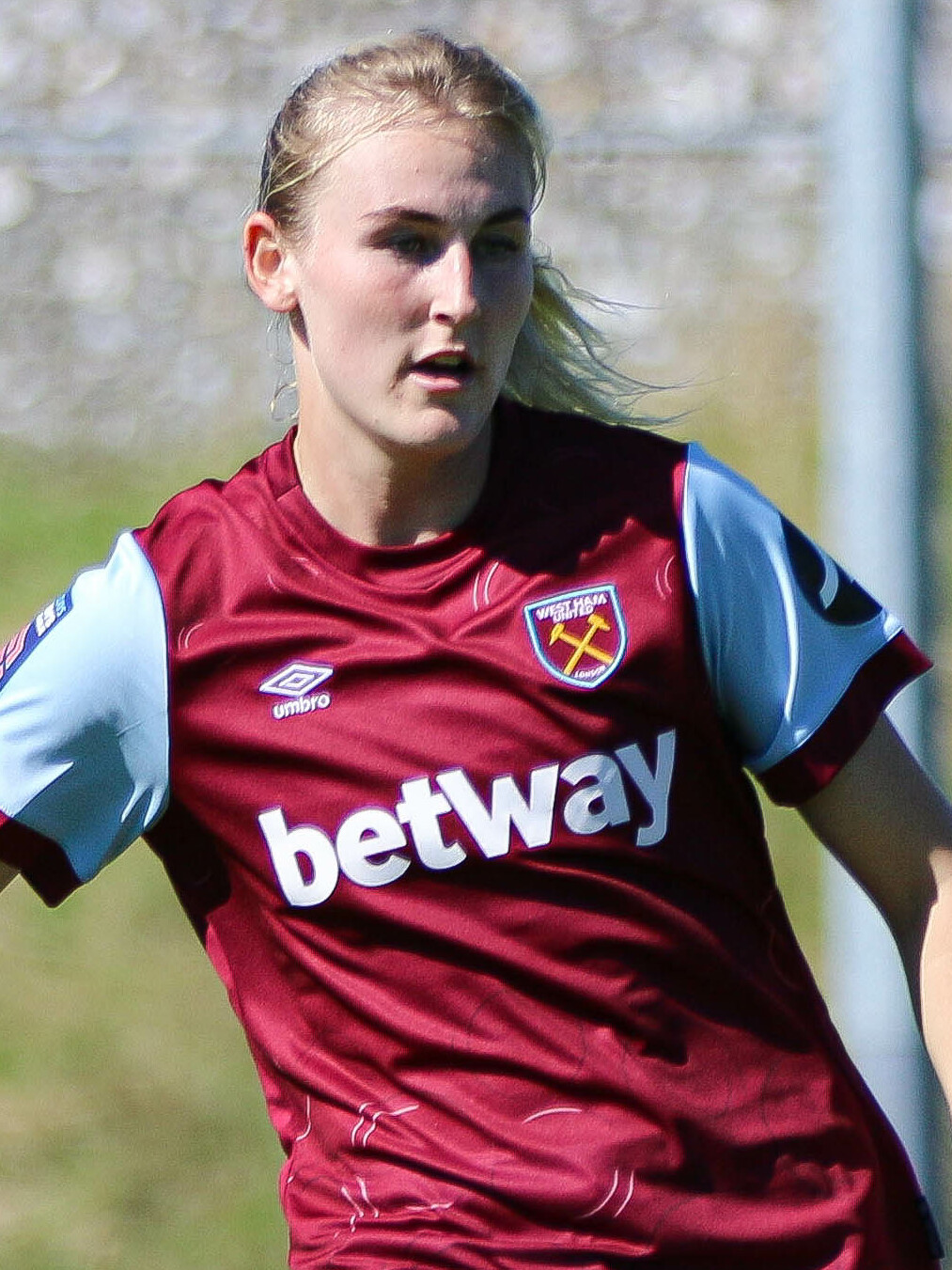
- Cooke playing for West Ham in 2023

Personal information
- Full name: Shannon Cooke
- Date of birth: 2 February 2000 (age 26)
- Place of birth: Rickmansworth, England
- Height: 5 ft 9 in (1.75 m)
- Position: Defender

Team information
- Current team: Birmingham City
- Number: 6

Youth career
- –2018: Arsenal

College career
Years	Team	Apps	(Gls)
2018–2022	LSU Tigers	94	(9)

Senior career*
Years	Team	Apps	(Gls)
2018	Arsenal	2	(0)
2023–2025	West Ham United	28	(1)
2025	→ Birmingham City (loan)	8	(1)
2025–	Birmingham City	21	(0)

International career^{‡}
2016–2017	England U17	8	(0)
2018–2020	England U19	5	(0)
- * Club domestic league appearances and goals as of 19 September 2026 ‡ National team caps and goals as of 22:43, 8 October 2021 (UTC)

Shannon Cooke (born 2 February 2000) is an English professional footballer who plays as a defender for Women's Super League club Birmingham City. Cooke has competed for England at the Under-15 and Under-19 level.

== Club career ==
=== Arsenal ===
Cooke made her Arsenal debut in the FA Women's Super League in the penultimate match of the 2017–18 season. She came on in the 87th minute, replacing goalscorer Beth Mead in a 2–0 win over Sunderland.

=== West Ham United ===
On 31 January 2023, Cooke joined West Ham United on a long-term contract.

==== Birmingham City (loan) ====
In January 2025, Cooke joined Women's Championship leaders Birmingham City on loan for the remainder of the season. Cooke earned the club's goal of the season award, the Women's Championship goal of the month (February), the Women's Championship defender of the month (February), and was nominated for the Women's Championship goal of the season.

=== Birmingham City ===
On 5 July 2025, it was announced that Cooke had signed permanently with Birmingham.

== Career statistics ==
=== Club ===
As of match played 30 September 2026

Appearances and goals by club, season and competition
Club	Season	League			National cup (Note: Includes Women's FA Cup)		League cup (Note: Includes FA Women's League Cup)		Total	
Club	Season	Division	Apps	Goals	Apps	Goals	Apps	Goals	Apps	Goals
Arsenal	2017–18	Women's Super League	2	0	0	0	0	0	2	0
West Ham United	2022–23	Women's Super League	1	0	0	0	1	0	2	0
West Ham United	2023–24	Women's Super League	19	1	1	0	3	0	22	1
West Ham United	2024–25	Women's Super League	8	0	0	0	4	0	12	0
West Ham United	Total		28	1	1	0	8	0	37	1
Birmingham City (loan)	2024–25	Women's Super League 2	8	1	0	0	0	0	8	1
Birmingham City	2025–26	Women's Super League 2	19	0	3	0	3	0	25	0
Birmingham City	2026–27	Women's Super League	2	0	0	0	2	0	4	0
Birmingham City	Total		21	0	3	0	5	0	29	0
Career total			59	1	4	0	13	0	76	1

== Honours ==
Arsenal

- Women's FA Cup runners up: 2017–18

Birmingham City

- Women's Super League 2: 2025–26
