= St Albans Girls' School =

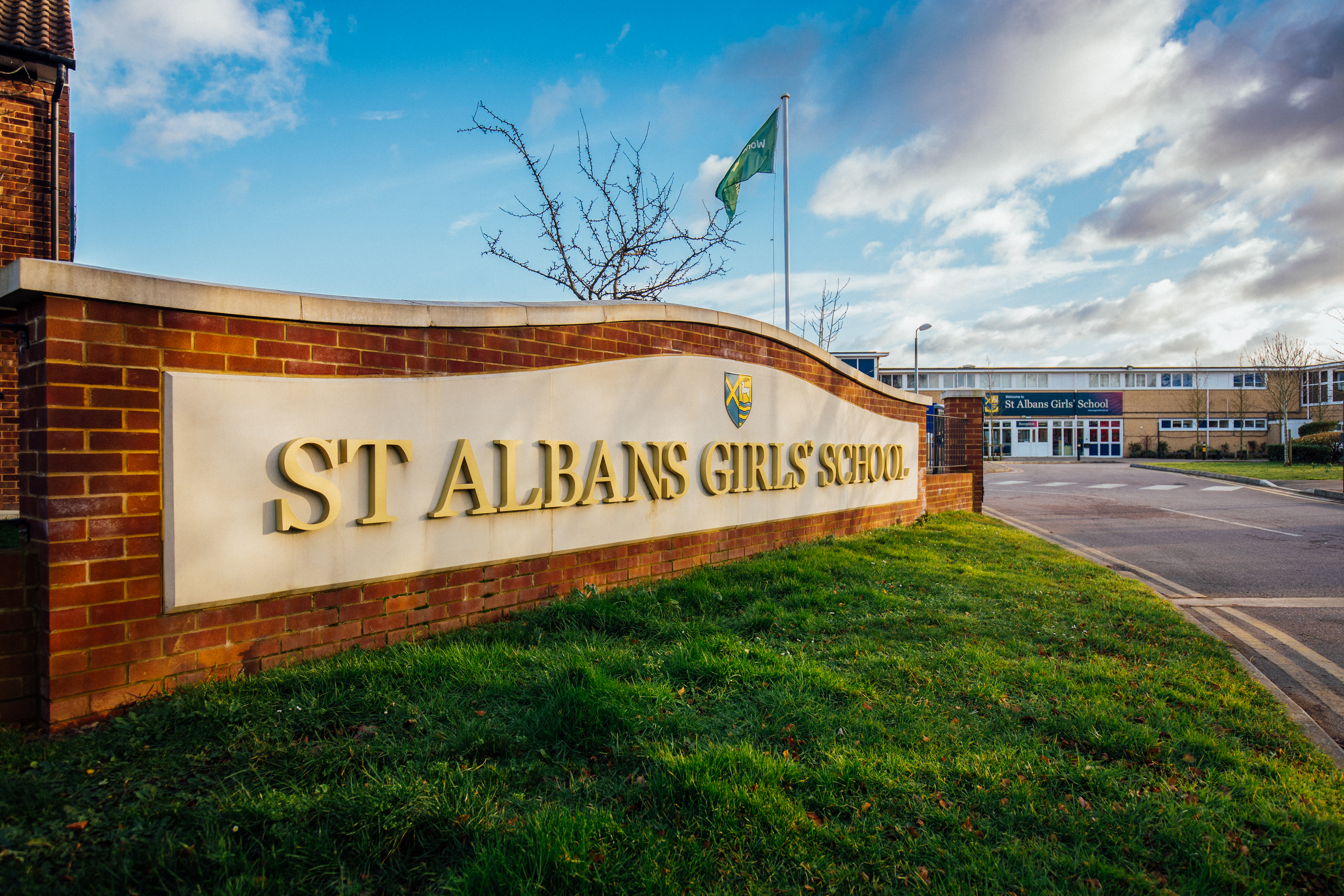

Location
- Sandridgebury Lane; St Albans, Hertfordshire, AL3 6DB; England; 51°46′13″N 0°19′55″W

Information
- Type: Academy
- Motto: Nobis Cura Futuri
- Established: 1920
- Department for Education URN: 137339 Tables
- Ofsted: Reports
- Headteacher: Paul Kershaw
- Gender: Girls (Boys also attend at Sixth Form)
- Age: 11 to 18
- Enrolment: 1,450
- Houses: 8 houses
- Colours: Blue and Gold
- Website: http://www.stags.herts.sch.uk

St Albans Girls' School, usually referred to as STAGS, is a girls' secondary school in St Albans, Hertfordshire. It was formerly known as "St Albans Girls' Grammar School."

It is one of three schools for girls in St Albans, the others being Loreto College and St Albans High School for Girls; the latter is private and selective. There are approximately 1,450 students, including boys, on roll at the school (2025 figures). The Headteacher is Paul Kershaw.

== Achievements and recognition ==
- Number of students achieving 5 GCSE grades 9-6 is usually between 85 and 90%.
- The School was awarded the School Achievement Award by DfES in 2002.

== House system ==
The school has eight houses, all named after famous women: Austen, Bronte, Curie, Franklin, Hepworth, Johnson, Parks and Seacole. The assigned colour of the house that a student belongs to is displayed as a small stag on their blouse collar. Parks is a new house that was made for the start of the 2019 academic year, after the school had finished its £2.5 million expansion that took a year to complete. The colours are as follows:

- Austen - Red
- Bronte - Yellow
- Curie - Green
- Franklin - Orange
- Hepworth - Blue
- Johnson - Silver
- Parks - Pink
- Seacole - Purple

Each house has two house captains elected from Year 12. The house system encourages a positive competitive nature in sports and competitions. There are a number of big events covered by the house system every year. The Christmas Fair includes stalls from each house competing for three awards: 'Best Stall', 'Best Display' and 'Best over all contribution to the Fair'. There is also an inter-house Easter event which has a different theme every year. There is also a themed 'House Challenge Day' every year, where each house has various tasks to fulfill to make up a final score. The winning house gets a large number of house points to add to their total.

The previous house system had seven houses, all named after planets: Krypton, Mars, Mercury, Jupiter, Neptune, Saturn and Pluto.

== Uniform ==
The uniform consists of a navy blue blazer with badge, a navy, knee-length skirt or navy trousers, a navy jumper with school trim and blue badge with embroidered STAGs in house colours. The Sixth form may wear more formal, work-style clothes, which include a smart skirt of reasonable length or smart full-length trousers and a blouse or top with sleeves. Boys should wear a formal shirt and trousers. On formal occasions when representing the school, all sixth formers must wear a black tailored jacket with white shirt (and tie for the boys), black trousers or skirt.

== Notable former pupils ==
- Olivia Allison, Olympic synchronized swimmer.
- Anouk Denton, footballer
- Maddy Prior of the electric folk band Steeleye Span.
- Jeany Spark, actress.
