= Emma Harries =

English footballer

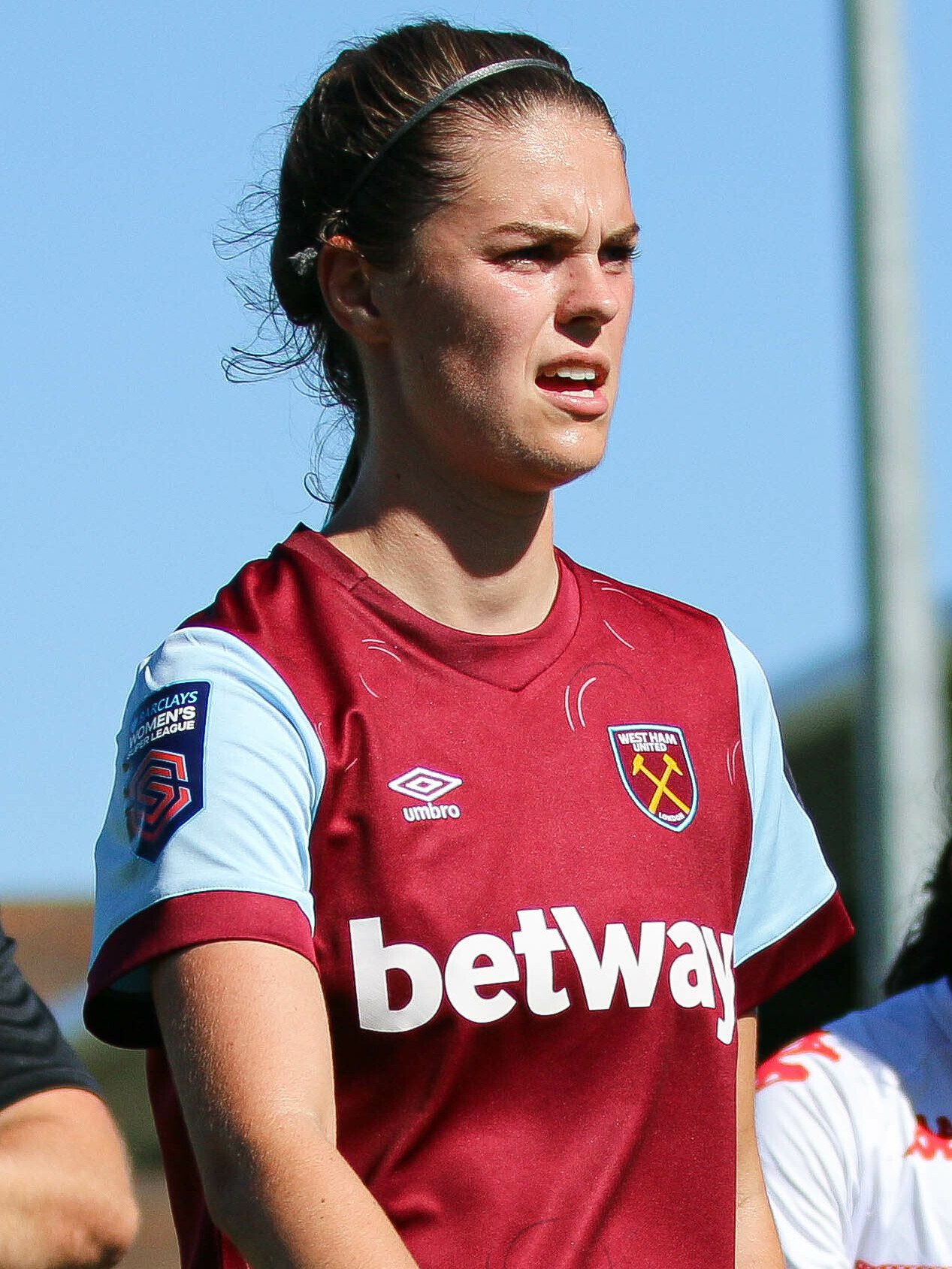
- Harries with West Ham United in August 2023

Personal information
- Full name: Emma Harries
- Date of birth: 29 March 2002 (age 24)
- Place of birth: Reading, England
- Height: 5 ft 10 in (1.78 m)
- Positions: Striker; forward

Team information
- Current team: Southampton F.C. Women

Youth career
- 2010–2017: Reading

Senior career*
Years	Team	Apps	(Gls)
2017–2023	Reading	51	(6)
2023–2025	West Ham United	17	(2)
2025–	Southampton F.C. Women	0	(0)

International career^{‡}
2018–2019	England U17	6	(2)
2022–	England U23	6	(0)
- * Club domestic league appearances and goals as of 02:36, 15 August 2024 (UTC) ‡ National team caps and goals as of 31 December 2023

Emma Harries (born 29 March 2002) is an English professional footballer who plays as a striker for Women's Super League 2 club Southampton.

== Early life ==
Harries was born in Reading, England. She joined Reading's academy at age 8 and began playing for the U-9's team; she remained at the academy until she was promoted to the first team.

== Club career ==
=== Reading ===
Harries made her senior debut on 4 October 2020 coming on in the 80th minute, replacing Amalie Eikeland in a win against West Ham. On 27 January 2021, Harries signed a two-and-a-half-year contract at Reading, her first professional contract.

Harries scored her first professional goal in a FA Women's Super League fixture against Bristol City in 2021.

On 29 June 2023, Reading announced the departure of Harries following their relegation to the Women's Championship. She ended her three seasons with the club after 6 goals from 51 appearances within the three seasons.

=== West Ham United ===
On 2 August 2023, Harries signed for West Ham United. She made her league debut against Manchester City on 1 October 2023. Harries scored her first goal in the FA Women's League Cup against Charlton Athletic on 11 October 2023, scoring in the 58th minute.

=== Southampton ===
On 2 July 2025, it was announced that Harries signed for Women's Super League 2 side Southampton.

== International career ==
=== Youth ===
In March 2019, Harries got called up to the England under-17s to play in the 2019 U-17 Championships qualifiers. She scored the opening two goals in an 8–0 win against Georgia.

In October 2021 Harries was named as part of the England U23 squad, appearing against Belgium as an 86th-minute substitute for Ebony Salmon. In November, she scored the opening goal in an 11–0 win against Estonia at St George's Park. She continued to feature in the under-23 squad in 2022 and 2023.

== Personal life ==
On 14 June 2025, Harries became engaged to Southampton teammate Ellie Brazil.

== Career statistics ==
=== Club ===
As of match played 17 December 2023

Appearances and goals by club, season and competition
Club	Season	League			National Cup		League Cup		Total	
Club	Season	Division	Apps	Goals	Apps	Goals	Apps	Goals	Apps	Goals
Reading	2020–21	Women's Super League	16	1	1	0	3	0	20	1
Reading	2021–22	Women's Super League	19	3	2	0	3	0	24	3
Reading	2022–23	Women's Super League	16	2	2	0	2	0	21	2
Reading	Total		51	6	5	0	8	0	64	6
West Ham United	2023–24	Women's Super League	9	2	0	0	1	1	10	1
Career total			60	6	5	0	9	1	74	7
