= Chancelle Effa Effa =

French footballer (born 2006)

Personal information
- Date of birth: 14 September 2006 (age 20)
- Place of birth: Le Havre, France
- Height: 1.72 m (5 ft 8 in)
- Position: Striker

Team information
- Current team: Birmingham City
- Number: 20

Youth career
- ES du Mont Gaillard
- 2015–2022: Le Havre

Senior career*
Years	Team	Apps	(Gls)
2022–2026	Le Havre	63	(13)
2026–	Birmingham City	5	(0)

International career^{‡}
2022	France U16	5	(3)
2022–2023	France U17	9	(6)
2022	France U18	1	(0)
2023–2025	France U19	23	(11)
2024	France U20	2	(0)
2025–	France U23	7	(1)
- * Club domestic league appearances and goals as of 4 October 2026 ‡ National team caps and goals as of 16:10, 9 August 2026 (UTC)

Chancelle Effa Effa (born 14 September 2006) is a French professional footballer who plays as a striker for Women's Super League club Birmingham City. She started her career in the Première Ligue with Le Havre AC.

== Early life ==
Effa Effa grew up in Le Havre, France, as the youngest of four sisters. She is of Cameroonian descent. She began playing football at the age of six with local club Entente Sportive du Mont-Gaillard, but after one season, her mother forced her to switch to basketball. Effa Effa soon persuaded her mother to allow her to switch back to football and joined Le Havre AC in 2015. She started off in Le Havre's mixed team before moving to the club's girls team. In 2021, Effa Effa also began training at INF Clairefontaine, spending the weekdays at the performance center before returning to play for Le Havre on the weekends. She left Clairefontaine shortly after, preferring to spend her time exclusively at Le Havre.

== Club career ==
=== Le Havre ===
Effa Effa moved through the ranks of Le Havre's academy, eventually getting an opportunity with the club's first team in 2022. She made her first team debut at the age of 15, becoming a member of the Le Havre squad that secured promotion to the Division 1 Féminine. In December 2022, she signed her first professional contract with the club. The following year, Effa Effa scored her first-ever professional goal. She then went on to score four more times in league play before the season concluded. On 18 March 2024, she netted a stoppage-time equalizer that helped Le Havre steal a draw from Montpellier in a 3–3 result.

In the 2024–25 season, Effa Effa struggled to show concrete consistency; she spent most of her time battling for minutes at striker with more experienced option Ikram Adjabi. Effa Effa ultimately earned the starting nod in exactly half of her 20 Première Ligue appearances. The following year, Effa Effa kicked off the season with a bang, recording 2 goals and 2 assists in Le Havre's opening five matches to become the club's all-time leading Division 1 goalscorer. In October 2025, she was nominated for the Première Ligue Player of the Month award alongside Clara Mateo and Inès Konan. She finished the season with 5 goals in a career-high 14 starts.

=== Birmingham City ===
On 6 August 2026, newly-promoted Women's Super League club Birmingham City announced the transfer acquisition of Effa Effa from Le Havre for a fee reportedly just upwards of £100,000.

== International career ==
Effa Effa has represented France internationally from every youth group ranging from U16 to U23. She made her first appearance for the youth national team in April 2022, participating in the Montaigu Tournament with the under-16s. Two minutes into her debut against the Netherlands, she scored the opening goal of the eventual 1–1 draw. The following year, Effa Effa was named to the squad that won the 2023 UEFA Women's Under-17 Championship. She scored 4 goals across the tournament and was placed on the competition's Best XI alongside teammates Liana Joseph and Maeline Mendy.

On 22 February 2025, Effa Effa scored a hat-trick in a U19 friendly against Sweden. In June 2025, she helped France to the UEFA Women's Under-19 Championship final, where they were beaten by Spain. Later that year, Effa Effa received her first call-up to the France U23s; she registered her first U23 start in a scoreless draw against Portugal, and her first U23 goal in a 2–2 tie with Norway.

== Career statistics ==
=== Club ===
As of match played 4 October 2026

Appearances and goals by club, season and competition
Club	Season	League			National cup (Note: Includes the Coupe de France)		League cup (Note: Includes the Coupe LFFP)		Total	
Club	Season	Division	Apps	Goals	Apps	Goals	Apps	Goals	Apps	Goals
Le Havre AC	2021–22	Division 2 Féminine	1	0	—		—		1	0
Le Havre AC	2022–23	Première Ligue	3	0	1	0	—		4	0
Le Havre AC	2023–24	Première Ligue	19	5	1	0	—		20	5
Le Havre AC	2024–25	Première Ligue	20	3	3	0	—		23	3
Le Havre AC	2025–26	Première Ligue	20	5	3	1	2	0	25	6
Le Havre AC	Total		63	13	8	1	2	0	73	14
Birmingham City	2026–27	Women's Super League	5	0	0	0	2	0	7	0
Career total			68	13	8	1	4	0	80	14
