= Isibeal Atkinson =

Irish footballer

Izzy Atkinson
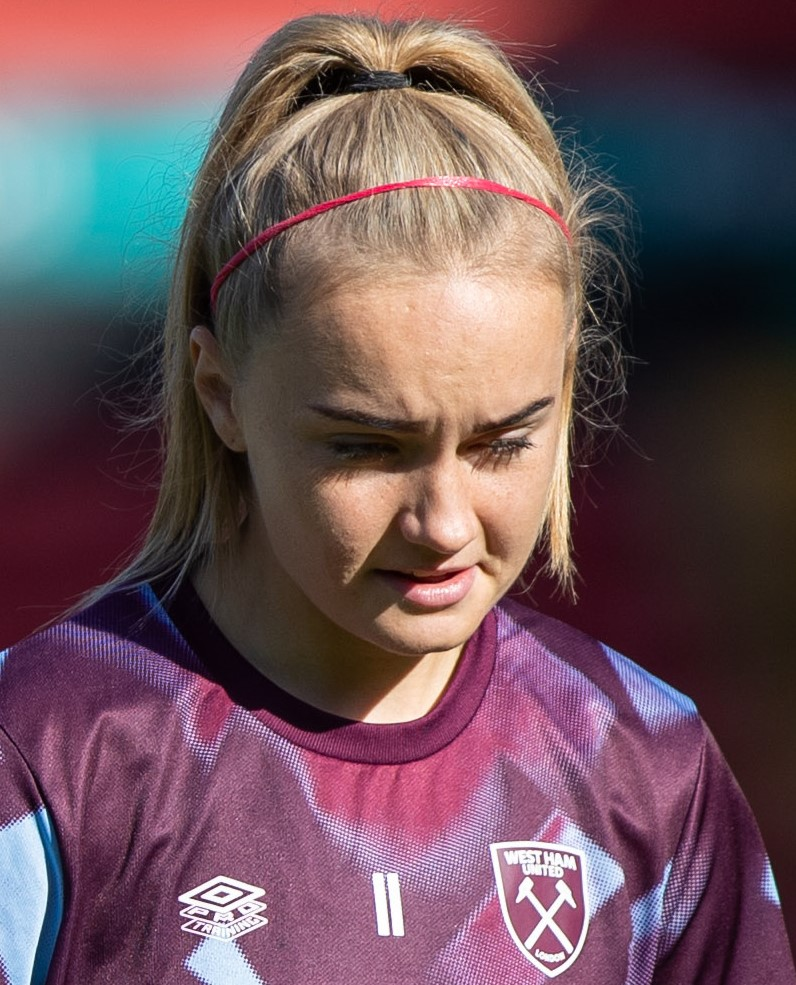
- Isibeal Atkinson in 2022

Personal information
- Full name: Isibeal Carolan Atkinson
- Date of birth: 17 July 2001 (age 25)
- Place of birth: Rush, County Dublin, Ireland
- Height: 1.67 m (5 ft 6 in)
- Positions: Full-back; winger

Team information
- Current team: Sunderland

Youth career
- 2014–2017: Enniskerry

Senior career*
| Years | Team | Apps | (Gls) |
| 2017–2021 | Shelbourne | 43 | (12) |
| 2021–2022 | Celtic | 30 | (3) |
| 2022–2024 | West Ham United | 21 | (1) |
| 2024–2025 | Crystal Palace | 14 | (2) |
| 2025– | Sunderland | 9 | (2) |

International career^{‡}
| 2018– | Republic of Ireland | 20 | (0) |
- * Club domestic league appearances and goals as of April 2026 ‡ National team caps and goals as of April 2026

Isibeal "Izzy" Carolan Atkinson (born 17 July 2001) is an Irish professional footballer who currently plays for Sunderland. She plays for the Republic of Ireland national team internationally. At club level, Atkinson has previously played for Shelbourne, Celtic, West Ham United and Crystal Palace.

== Club career ==
Atkinson played youth football for Rush Athletic and the Metropolitan Girls' League Academy, before spending three years with Enniskerry FC. She signed for Women's National League (WNL) club Shelbourne in July 2017.

The 2020 WNL season, delayed by the COVID-19 pandemic, began with Atkinson in excellent form for Shelbourne. Instead of occupying her usual position on the wing, she had been repurposed as an attacking left-back. Her goal against Bohemians was named Goal of the Month for August 2020.

In February 2021, Atkinson signed for Scottish Women's Premier League club Celtic. She featured in Celtic's 2021–22 UEFA Women's Champions League matches, creating an equaliser against FC Minsk following a solo dribble down the pitch. In May 2022 she scored an extra time winning goal in the Scottish Women's Cup final, as Celtic beat rivals Glasgow City 3–2.

In July 2022, Atkinson and another young Irish player Tyler Toland both left Celtic. Atkinson then joined English Women's Super League club West Ham United later that month.

In January 2024, FA Women's Championship side Crystal Palace announced they had signed Atkinson on a contract until 2025. On 10 June 2025, Crystal Palace announced that Atkinson was one of five players set to leave the club.

On 31 July 2025, it was announced that Atkinson had joined Women's Super League 2 club Sunderland on a one-year contract with the option for a further year extension. She started in the opening game of the 2025-26 WSL2 season, scoring the first goal of the season in the 40th minute of a 4–0 win over Sheffield United on 5 September 2025.

== International career ==
In October 2017, Republic of Ireland national team coach Colin Bell named 16-year-old Atkinson in his squad for a FIFA Women's World Cup qualifying fixture in Slovakia. She won her first senior cap as a 90th-minute substitute for Leanne Kiernan in a 3–1 friendly win over Portugal at the Estádio de São Miguel, Ponta Delgada, on 22 January 2018.

Atkinson's first competitive appearance for Ireland was in a 1–0 FIFA Women's World Cup qualifying defeat in Norway in June 2018. She was an 89th-minute substitute for Áine O'Gorman and was shown the yellow card. She started her first match in a 1–0 friendly defeat by Belgium, staged in Murcia, Spain, on 20 January 2019.

Atkinson was named in Vera Pauw's squad for the 2023 FIFA Women's World Cup.

== Career statistics ==
=== Club ===
As of match played 3 March 2024

Appearances and goals by club, season and competition
| Club | Season | League | | | National cup (Note: Includes FAI Women's Cup, Scottish Women's Cup, Women's FA Cup) | | League cup (Note: Includes Women’s National League Cup, Scottish Women's Premier League Cup, FA Women's League Cup) | | Continental (Note: includes UEFA Women's Champions League) | | Total | |
| Club | Season | Division | Apps | Goals | Apps | Goals | Apps | Goals | Apps | Goals | Apps | Goals |
|---|---|---|---|---|---|---|---|---|---|---|---|---|
| Shelbourne | 2017 | Women's National League | 4 | 0 | 0 | 0 | 0 | 0 | — | | 4 | 0 |
| Shelbourne | 2018 | Women's National League | 19 | 8 | 2 | 0 | 1 | 0 | 0 | 0 | 22 | 8 |
| Shelbourne | 2019 | Women's National League | 8 | 1 | 1 | 0 | 1 | 0 | — | | 10 | 1 |
| Shelbourne | 2020 | Women's National League | 12 | 3 | 1 | 0 | 0 | 0 | — | | 13 | 3 |
| Shelbourne | Total | | 43 | 12 | 4 | 0 | 2 | 0 | 0 | 0 | 49 | 12 |
| Celtic | 2020–21 | SWPL | 11 | 1 | 0 | 0 | 0 | 0 | — | | 11 | 1 |
| Celtic | 2021–22 | SWPL | 19 | 2 | 2 | 1 | 2 | 0 | 2 | 0 | 25 | 3 |
| Celtic | Total | | 30 | 3 | 2 | 1 | 2 | 0 | 2 | 0 | 36 | 4 |
| West Ham United | 2022–23 | Women's Super League | 15 | 1 | 2 | 0 | 3 | 0 | — | | 20 | 1 |
| West Ham United | 2023–24 | Women's Super League | 7 | 0 | 0 | 0 | 2 | 1 | — | | 9 | 1 |
| West Ham United | Total | | 22 | 1 | 2 | 0 | 5 | 1 | — | | 29 | 2 |
| Crystal Palace F.C. (loan) | 2023–24 | Championship | 3 | 2 | 0 | 0 | 0 | 0 | — | | 3 | 2 |
| Crystal Palace F.C. (loan) | Total | | 3 | 2 | 0 | 0 | 0 | 0 | — | | 3 | 2 |
| Career total | | | 98 | 18 | 8 | 1 | 9 | 1 | 2 | 0 | 117 | 20 |

=== International ===
As of match played 3 December 2024

Appearances and goals by national team and year
| National team | Year | Apps | Goals |
|---|---|---|---|
| Republic of Ireland | 2018 | 2 | 0 |
| Republic of Ireland | 2019 | 1 | 0 |
| Republic of Ireland | 2022 | 1 | 0 |
| Republic of Ireland | 2023 | 9 | 0 |
| Republic of Ireland | 2024 | 5 | 0 |
| Republic of Ireland | 2025 | 2 | 0 |
| Total | | 20 | 0 |
