= Océane Hurtré =

French footballer (born 2004)

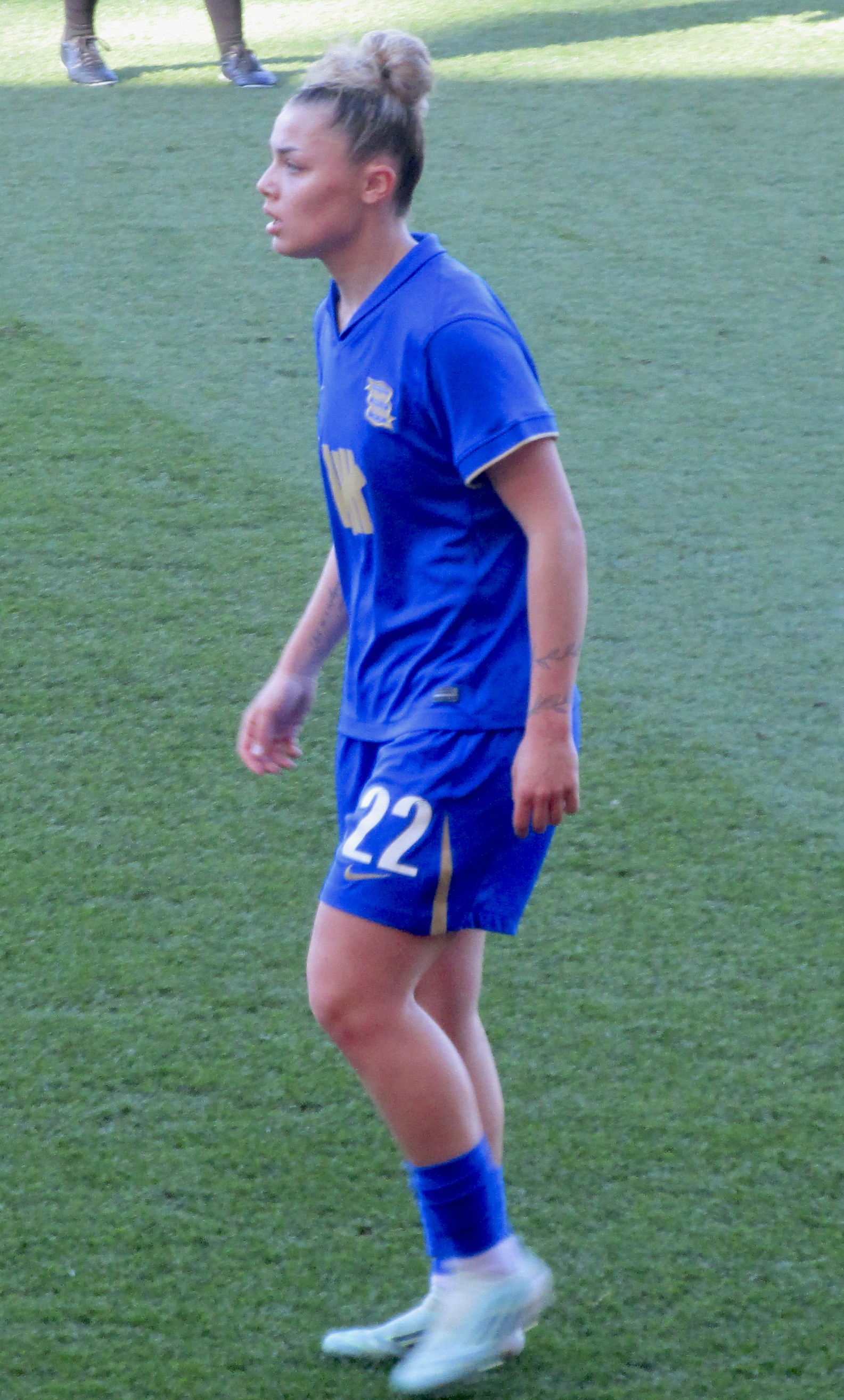
- Hurtré with Birmingham City in 2026

Personal information
- Full name: Océane Aline Andréa Jackie Hurtré
- Date of birth: 17 February 2004 (age 22)
- Place of birth: Rennes, France
- Height: 1.67 m (5 ft 6 in)
- Positions: Midfielder; forward

Team information
- Current team: Birmingham City
- Number: 22

Youth career
- 2010–2013: Paris Saint-Germain
- 2013–2017: AS Poissy
- 2017–2018: Lyon
- 2018–2022: Paris Saint-Germain

Senior career*
Years	Team	Apps	(Gls)
2020–2025	Paris Saint-Germain	14	(0)
2022–2023	→ Dijon (loan)	13	(0)
2023–2024	→ Bordeaux (loan)	5	(0)
2025–	Birmingham City	27	(9)

International career^{‡}
2020	France U16	3	(1)
2022	France U19	5	(3)
2022–2024	France U20	10	(0)
2024–2026	France U23	6	(0)
2026–	France	1	(1)
- * Club domestic league appearances and goals as of 17 October 2026 ‡ National team caps and goals as of 10 October 2026

Océane Aline Andréa Jackie Hurtré (French: [ɔ.se.an a.lin ɑ̃.dʁe.a dʒa.ki yʁ.tʁe]; born 17 February 2004) is a French professional footballer who plays as a midfielder or forward for Women's Super League club Birmingham City and the France national team.

== Club career ==
Hurtré is a youth academy graduate of Paris Saint-Germain (PSG). She made her professional debut for the club on 10 December 2020 in a 2–0 win against Górnik Łęczna. On 13 July 2022, she signed her first professional contract with PSG until June 2025.

On 6 September 2022, Hurtré joined Dijon on a season long loan deal. On her first start for the club, she provided an assist for Léa Declercq's header. On 26 September 2023, Hurtré was loaned to Bordeaux until June 2024, with an option to buy.

On 29 August 2025, Hurtré joined Women's Super League 2 club Birmingham City on a three-year contract. On 20 February 2026, she scored a hattrick in Birmingham's 8–0 win against Chatham Town FC, helping the club to qualify for the quarterfinals of the FA Cup. In October 2026, the Women's Super League named her Player of the Month.

== International career ==
Hurtré has represented France at various youth levels. She was called up to the France squad for the FIFA U-20 Women's World Cup in 2022 and 2024.

In October 2026, Hurtré received her first call-up to the France national team. She made her debut on 10 October 2026 by scoring a goal in a 9–0 win against Latvia.

== Career statistics ==
=== International ===
As of match played 10 October 2026

Appearances and goals by national team and year
National team	Year	Apps	Goals
France	2026	1	1
Total		1	1

Scores and results list France's goal tally first, score column indicates score after each Hurtré goal.

List of international goals scored by Océane Hurtré
No.	Date	Venue	Opponent	Score	Result	Competition
1	10 October 2026	Stade Francis Le Basser, Laval, France	Latvia	6–0	9–0	Friendly

== Honours ==
Paris Saint-Germain

- Première Ligue: 2020–21

Birmingham City

- Women's Super League 2: 2025–26
