= Katie Startup =

English footballer

Personal information
- Full name: Katie Louise Startup
- Date of birth: 28 January 1999 (age 27)
- Place of birth: Maidstone, England
- Height: 1.71 m (5 ft 7 in)
- Position: Goalkeeper

Team information
- Current team: Birmingham City

Youth career
- Meridian Girls
- Gillingham
- Chelsea

Senior career*
Years	Team	Apps	(Gls)
2017	Chelsea	0	(0)
2017–2020	Charlton Athletic	32	(0)
2020–2024	Brighton & Hove Albion	2	(0)
2020	→ Charlton Athletic (loan)	4	(0)
2021	→ Liverpool (loan)	0	(0)
2024	→ Manchester City (loan)	0	(0)
2024–2026	Manchester City	0	(0)
2025	→ Everton (loan)	0	(0)
2026–	Birmingham City	0	(0)

International career^{‡}
2016	England U17	1	(0)
2018	England U19	1	(0)
- * Club domestic league appearances and goals as of 13:00, 6 September 2024 (UTC) ‡ National team caps and goals as of 9 April 2018

Katie Louise Startup (born 28 January 1999) is an English professional footballer who plays as a goalkeeper for Women's Super League club Birmingham City.

== Club career ==
=== Early career ===
While attending Maidstone Grammar School for Girls, Startup played football for the school team and was picked up by Meridian Girls FC. From there she joined Gillingham and then Chelsea.

=== Charlton Athletic ===
Startup began her senior career in 2017 at Charlton Athletic, in third tier of women's football. Here, she helped Charlton achieve promotion to the Women's Championship.

The following season, Startup played in all 20 matches of the 2018–19 campaign. Charlton finished in third place, narrowly missing out on promotion to Tottenham Hotspur in second, five points ahead. During this season, Startup kept eight clean sheets, and was nominated for the November 2018 Women's Championship Player of the Month. However, Startup missed out to Mollie Green, who was at Manchester United at the time.

The 2019–20 season was less successful for Startup and Charlton. Charlton failed to win in any of their 12 games, before the season was terminated, however Startup managed to keep one clean sheet during the season, in a 0–0 draw against Lewes. In October 2019, Startup raised awareness for mental health and suicide by changing her kit number from 1 to 40.

=== Brighton & Hove Albion ===
After Startup's impressive performances in the Women's Championship, she caught the eye of Brighton & Hove Albion, who snatched up her services in the summer of 2020, and signed her on a 2-year contract. Startup made her debut for Brighton in the Women's FA Cup against Huddersfield on 16 May 2020.

On 28 October 2023 she signed a contract extension with Brighton.

==== Return to Charlton Athletic ====
Shortly after signing for Brighton, Startup returned to Charlton on a short-term loan for the 2020–21 season.

Startup made her first appearance since returning to Charlton against Crystal Palace in a 2–2 draw. She made three other appearances for Charlton that season, coming against Blackburn Rovers, Liverpool, and Coventry United.

Startup kept her first and only clean sheet of her four appearances against Blackburn, in a 1–0 victory away from home.

==== Manchester City (loan) ====
On 14 April 2024, Startup joined Manchester City on an emergency loan for the remainder of the 2023–24 season.

=== Manchester City ===
After spending the last few weeks of the previous season on loan to Manchester City, Startup signed a two-year deal with the club on 6 September 2024.

==== Loan to Everton ====
On 28 September 2025, Startup joined Everton on an emergency loan, following an injury to Courtney Brosnan. On 16 November 2025, she returned to Manchester City.

=== Birmingham City ===
On 23 July 2026, Startup was announced at Birmingham City.

== International career ==
Startup has represented England at an U17 and U19 level.
