= Marie Levasseur =

Canadian soccer player (born 1997)

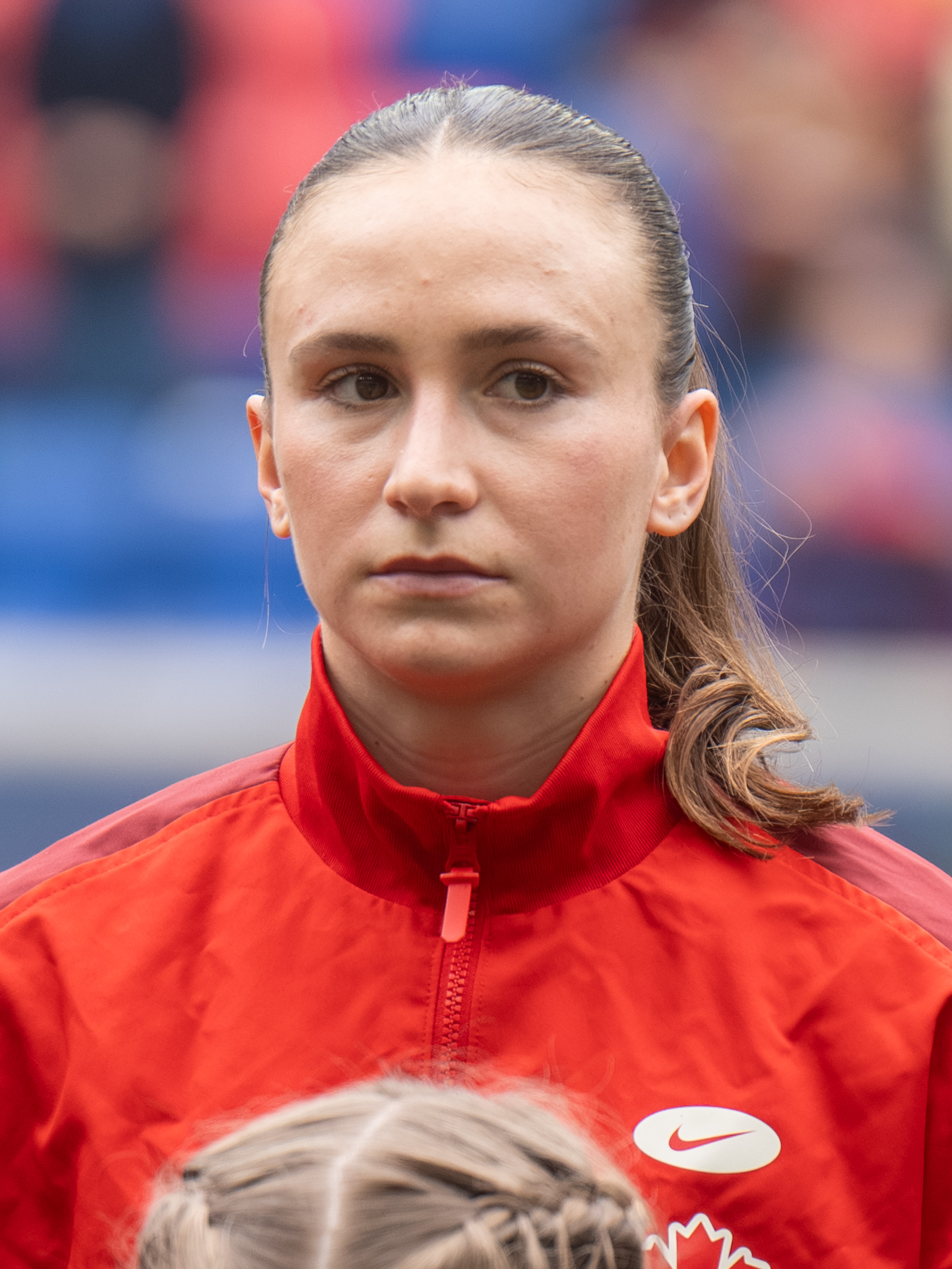
- Levasseur with Canada in 2026

Personal information
- Date of birth: May 18, 1997 (age 29)
- Place of birth: Stoneham, Quebec, Canada
- Height: 5 ft 8 in (1.73 m)
- Position: Left-back

Team information
- Current team: Birmingham City
- Number: 3

Youth career
- CS Haute-Saint-Charles

College career
Years	Team	Apps	(Gls)
2015–2018	Memphis Tigers	75	(24)

Senior career*
Years	Team	Apps	(Gls)
2015	Quebec Dynamo ARSQ	–	(–)
2019	ONS Oulu	24	(13)
2020–2021	FC Metz	6	(2)
2021–2023	FC Fleury 91	41	(1)
2023–2026	Montpellier	63	(2)
2026–	Birmingham City	0	(0)

International career^{‡}
2013–2014	Canada U17	8	(9)
2016	Canada U20	2	(0)
2015	Canada U23	4	(0)
2015–	Canada	18	(0)
- * Club domestic league appearances and goals as of July 26, 2026 ‡ National team caps and goals as of April 18, 2026

Marie Levasseur (born May 18, 1997) is a Canadian professional soccer player who plays as a left-back for Women's Super League club Birmingham City and for the Canada national team.

== Early life ==
Levasseur began playing soccer at age four with CS Haute-Saint-Charles. In 2009, she was part of the Eastern Canada team in the Canadian qualification tournament for the U12 Danone Nations Cup. In 2014, she was named the Quebec Soccer Federation Youth Player of the Year.

== College career ==
In 2015, she began attending the University of Memphis, where she played for the women's soccer team. She scored her first collegiate goal on September 13, 2015 against the Idaho Vandals. After her freshman season she was named the American Athletic Conference Rookie of the Year, was named to the AAC All-Rookie Team and the All-ACC Second Team. In 2016, she was named to the NSCAA All-Northeast Region. In 2016, 2017, and 2018, she was named to both the All-AAC First Team and All-AAC Academic team all three years, while also being named to the AAC All-Tournament team in 2018.

== Club career ==
In 2015, she played with Quebec Dynamo ARSQ in the USL W-League.

In 2019, she was set to attend preseason on trial with the Chicago Red Stars of the NWSL, but was then offered a contract with Finnish club ONS Oulu in the top tier Naisten Liiga instead, which she signed. She scored her first goal in her debut on March 23 against HJK. In her sole season with Oulu, she scored 13 goals in 24 league games, finishing as runner-up for the Naisten Liiga Rookie of the Year Award. She was named the 2019 Soccer Quebec women's Professional Player of the Year for her performance.

In January 2020, she joined French club FC Metz in the top tier Division 1 Féminine. In her debut match for Metz in February, she suffered an injury and then the remainder of the season was cancelled after the COVID-19 pandemic hit in March, resulting in her playing only one game that season, and Metz were relegated to the second tier for the following season. She remained with the club, now in the second tier, scoring two goals in five matches, as the season was again curtailed by the COVID-19 pandemic.

In June 2021, Levasseur returned to the French first tier, signing with FC Fleury 91. She scored her first goal for Fleury on November 20, 2021 against Guingamp.

Levasseur moved from Montpelier to Women's Super League club Birmingham City on July 17, 2026.

== International career ==
In 2013, Levasseur made her debut in the Canadian youth program, attending a camp with the Canada U17 team in October 2013, before subsequently being named to the roster for the 2013 CONCACAF Women's U-17 Championship, where she scored 5 goals to help Canada win the silver medal and was named to the tournament Best XI, and the 2014 FIFA U-17 Women's World Cup, where she scored four goals and was named Player of the Game against Ghana U17.

In 2015, she was named to the Canada U23 team for the 2015 Pan Am Games. In 2016, she was named to the Canada U20 team for the 2016 FIFA U-20 Women's World Cup.

In December 2015, was then called up to the Canada senior team, making her debut on December 13 in a 4-0 victory over Trinidad and Tobago, recording an assist on the first goal by Christine Sinclair.

== Personal life ==
She has a twin sister, Catherine Levasseur, who played with her with the Memphis Tigers and ONS Oulu.
