= Marika Bergman-Lundin =

Swedish footballer

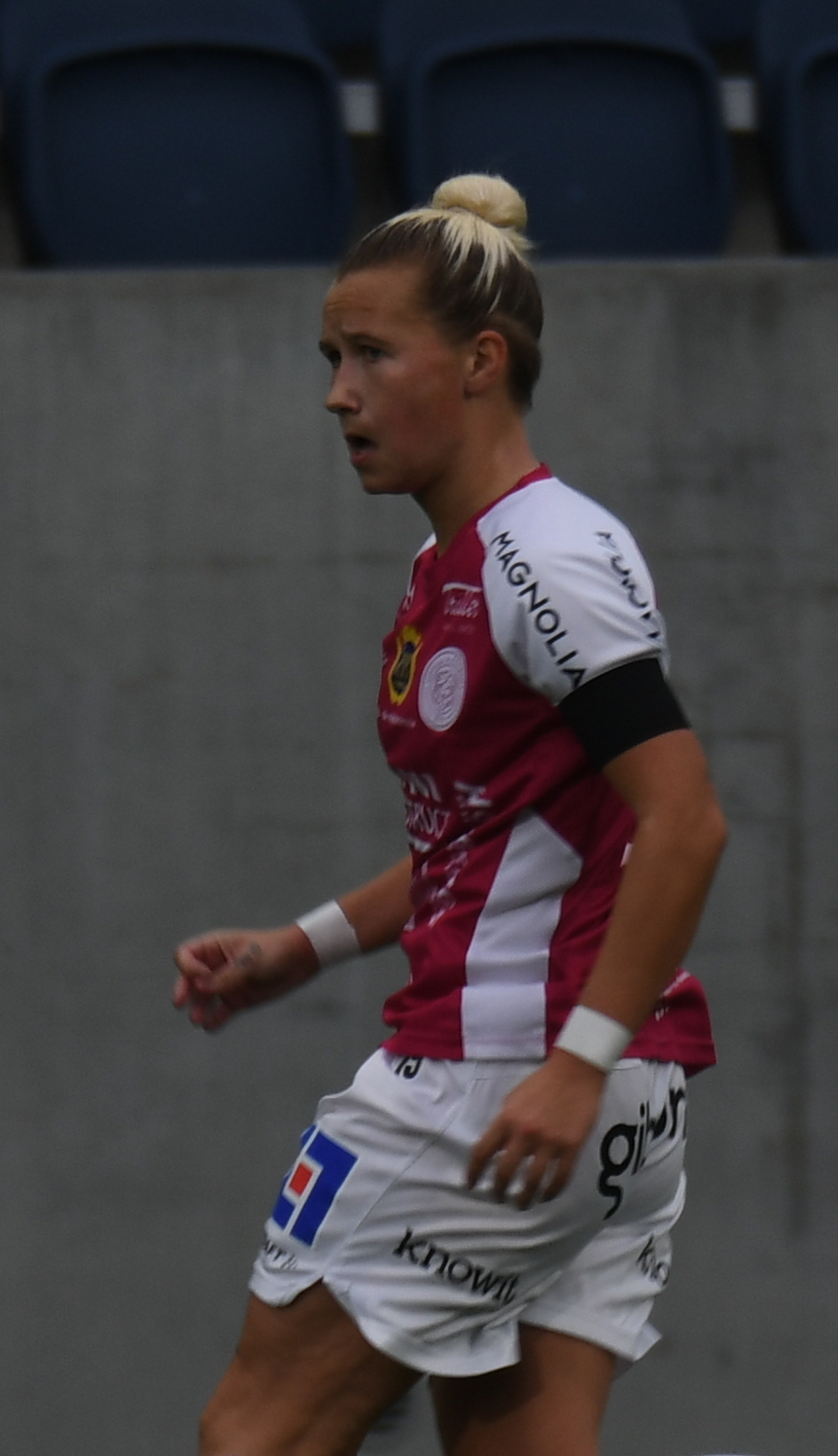

Personal information
- Full name: Anna Marika Bergman-Lundin
- Date of birth: 12 July 1999 (age 27)
- Place of birth: Landvetter, Sweden
- Height: 1.65 m (5 ft 5 in)
- Position: Midfielder

Team information
- Current team: Lazio
- Number: 19

Youth career
- Landvetter IF

Senior career*
Years	Team	Apps	(Gls)
2016–2017	Kopparbergs/Göteborg FC	9	(0)
2018	Jitex BK	16	(8)
2019–2021	IK Uppsala	71	(8)
2022–2023	BK Häcken	52	(6)
2024–2025	West Ham United	10	(0)
2025–2026	Vålerenga	7	(0)
2026	Lazio	0	(0)
2026–	IFK Göteborg	0	(0)

International career
2016	Sweden U19	3	(0)
- * Club domestic league appearances and goals as of 24 June 2026

Anna Marika Bergman-Lundin (Swedish: [maˈrîːka ˈbæ̌rjman lɵnˈdiːn]; born 12 July 1999) is a Swedish professional footballer who plays as a midfielder for Damallsvenskan club IFK Göteborg.

== Club career ==
=== Göteborg FC ===
Bergman-Lundin made her league debut against Umeå IK on 8 May 2016.

=== IK Uppsala ===
She signed for IK Uppsala in January 2019, after spending a season with Jitex BK. She made her league debut against Umeå on 13 April 2019. Bergman-Lundin scored her first league goal against Sundsvalls DFF on 24 August 2019, scoring in the 77th minute.

=== BK Häcken ===
On 21 January 2022, Bergman-Lundin was announced at BK Häcken. She made her league debut against Umeå on 27 March 2022. Bergman-Lundin scored her first league goal against Vittsjö GIK on 12 June 2022, scoring in the 76th minute. She scored on her UEFA Women's Champions League debut against PSG on 21 September 2022, scoring in the 24th minute.

=== West Ham ===
On 31 January 2024, Bergman-Lundin was announced at West Ham. She made her league debut against Arsenal on 4 February 2024.

=== Vålerenga ===
In 2025, Bergman-Lundin joined Norwegian club Vålerenga.

=== Lazio ===
In January 2026, Bergman-Lundin joined Italian club Lazio.

=== IFK Göteborg ===
During the summer of 2026, Bergman-Lundin signed for Elitettan club IFK Göteborg. Her goal in the final game of the season ment that the team could secure advancement for top flight Damallsvenskan for the 2027 season.
