= Neve Herron =

English footballer (born 2003)

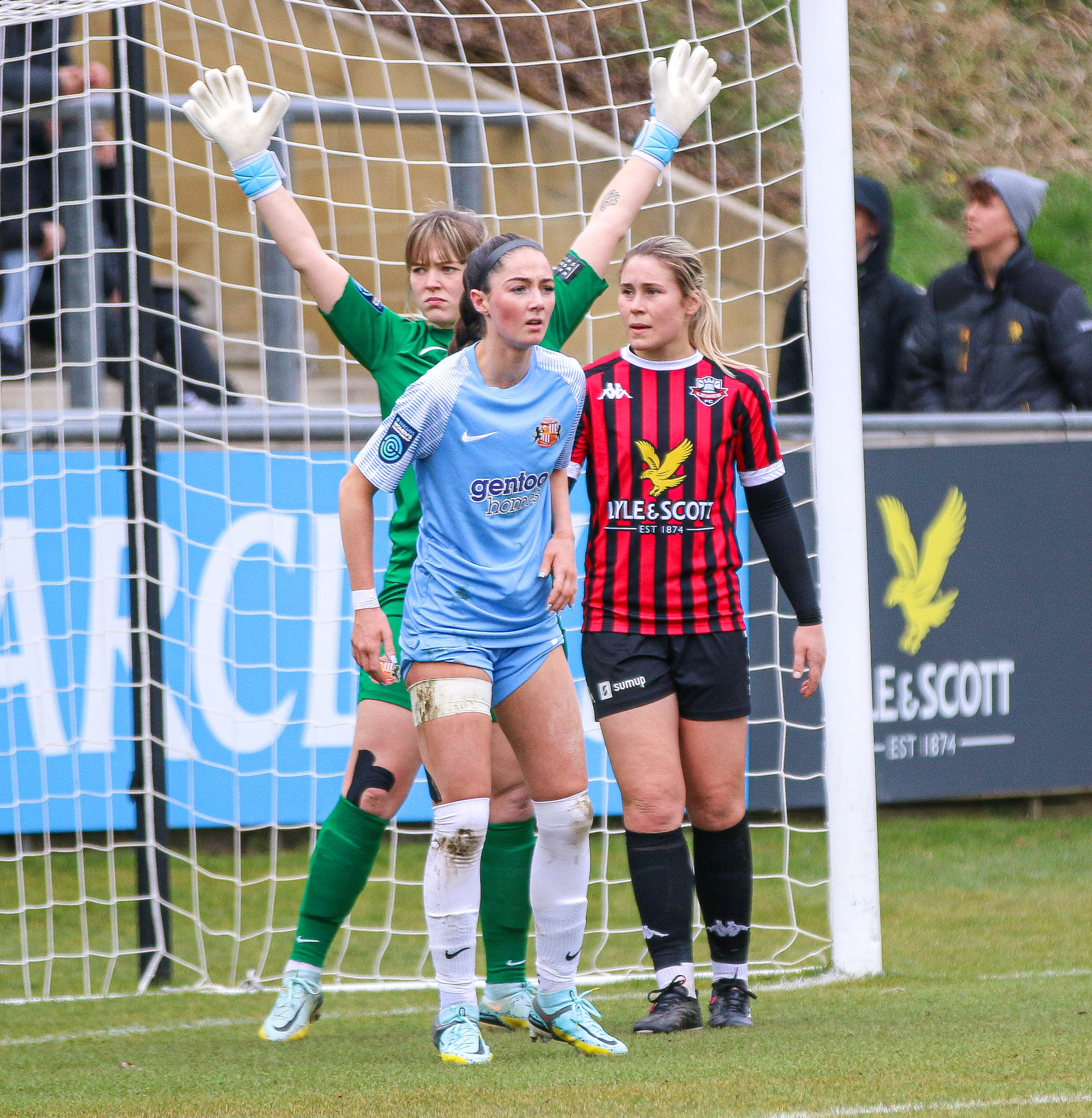
- Herron (in blue) with Sunderland in 2023

Personal information
- Full name: Neve Grace Herron
- Date of birth: 27 June 2003 (age 23)
- Place of birth: Sunderland, England
- Position: Full-back

Team information
- Current team: Birmingham City
- Number: 30

Youth career
- –2019: Sunderland

Senior career*
| Years | Team | Apps | (Gls) |
| 2019–2023 | Sunderland | 45 | (5) |
| 2023– | Birmingham City | 31 | (2) |

International career^{‡}
| 2022 | England U19 | 2 | (0) |
| 2024– | England U23 | 1 | (0) |
- * Club domestic league appearances and goals as of 21:12, 24 November 2024 (UTC) (Note: Includes appearances and goals in the National League and Championship combined.) ‡ National team caps and goals as of 10:30, 4 December 2024 (UTC)

Neve Grace Herron (born 27 June 2003) is an English professional footballer who plays as a defender for Women's Super League club Birmingham City and the England under-23 national team.

== Youth career ==
Herron began playing for Boldon Girls, in the north east of England, then trialed for Middlesbrough and Sunderland youth academies, before choosing the latter having been offered to join both. She had also been spotted by former Sunderland player Gary Bennett when joining aged 13.

== Club career ==
=== Sunderland ===
For the 2019–20 National League North season, aged 16, Herron joined the Birmingham City first team.

On 7 November 2019, she scored a brace against Stoke City to continue Sunderlands unbeaten run in the league with seven wins, having come on as a 67th-minute substitute.

On 22 February 2022, having played in every match of the 2021–22 season so far, Herron signed with Sunderland for another season. By the end of the 2022–23 season, she had made 39 appearances in the Women's Championship for Sunderland and scored four goals.

In June 2023, as a surprising and significant setback for Sunderland, it was announced that Herron had left the club. Upon her official departure the following month, the Sunderland Echo stated Herron would have been the "poster girl" for the revamped team had she stayed.

=== Birmingham City ===
On 26 July 2023, Herron signed for Birmingham City on a two-year deal. According to the Sunderland Echo, she was persuaded by the security of a full-time contract, and otherwise the club's setup, compared to the mixture of full and part-time deals with Sunderland. In the 2023–24 season, she developed into a key player for the team, while experiencing injury problems, including breaking her nose.

On 12 October 2024, during the 2024–25 season, Herron scored her debut goal for City against Sheffield United, the opening goal in a 2–0 win, to help take City to the top of the Women's Championship on goal difference. For the month of October, she was nominated for the Women's Championship Player of the Month award. On 20 November, she scored her second goal, a header as the second goal in a 2–0 win over London City Lionesses, helping City to move 3 points clear at the top of the table.

== International career ==
In July 2021, Herron featured for the England under-19s in the 4–1 victory over Czech Republic, coming on as an 83rd-minute substitute.

On 29 November 2023, she received her first call up to the England under-23s for fixtures against France and Spain, where she was an unused substitute. Herron again trained with the under-23s in April 2024 for a match against Sweden, without making an appearance in the game, followed by being selected in November 2024 for European League matches and the final camp for the year. On 2 December 2024, as part of the starting eleven, Herron made her debut for the under-23s, in a 2–1 defeat to Sweden.

== Style of play ==
Herron is able to play across the defence as well as in midfield, and as a versatile player has been described as a "flexible, adaptive, committed, and technically gifted" by Roker Report. With Sunderland she played centrally in defence, and according to Wyscout stats, was rated among the highest in the Championship for defensive and aerial duels, ball dribbling, and crosses from deep.

== Personal life ==
Herron looks up to England defender Lucy Bronze and former Sunderland midfielder Keira Ramshaw.

== Honours ==
Birmingham City

- Women's Super League 2: 2025–26
