= She Kicks =

Women's football magazine

- April 2010 cover, featuring Fara Williams
- Editor: Jennifer O'Neill
- Categories: Football
- Frequency: Bi-monthly
- First issue: October 1996
- Company: Baltic Publications
- Country: United Kingdom
- Language: English
- Website: www.shekicks.net

She Kicks is a women's football magazine and website published by Baltic Publications. Produced bi-monthly, costing £4.25, and at 64–72 pages long, it published FIFA Women's World Cup special editions in 2011 and 2015 and a 20th anniversary special edition in November 2016. They also printed a women's football calendar annually from 2010 to 2019.

== History and profile ==
She Kicks began as On the Ball in 1996, the first dedicated women's football magazine in England. Original editor, Joanne Smith, and founder, Andrew Mullen, had wanted to call the magazine ElleFC, but an objection from Emap—publishers of Elle in the UK—led to a change of plan. The name was changed to She Kicks, then Fair Game in 2003, before reverting to She Kicks in December 2009.

As of 2022 the editor was Jennifer O'Neill, a former Times columnist and Sunderland Women footballer, who also works as a television pundit on Eurosport's women's football coverage.
