= Martha Harris (footballer) =

English footballer (born 1994)

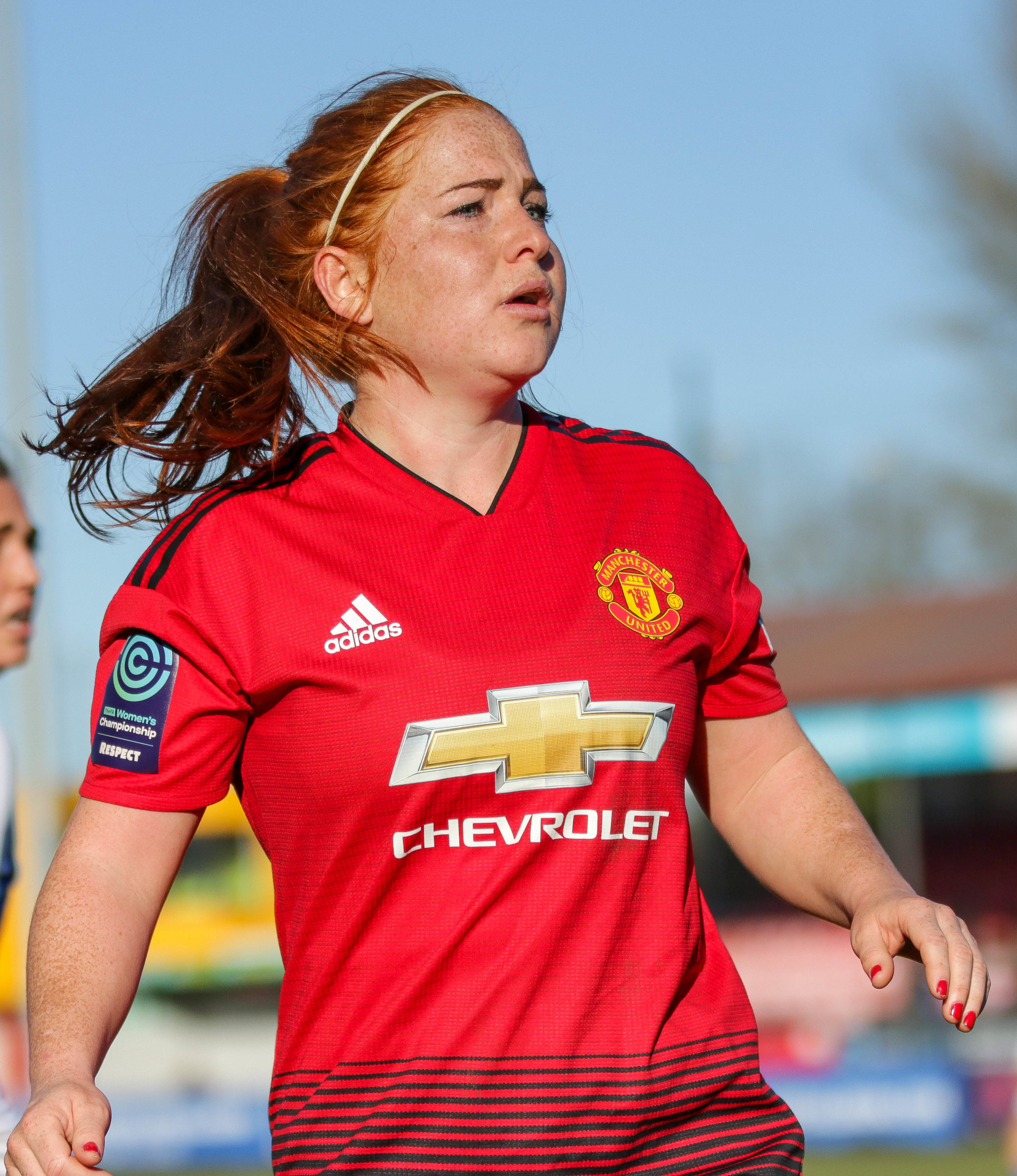
- Martha Harris playing for Manchester United in February 2019

Personal information
- Full name: Martha Harris
- Date of birth: 19 August 1994 (age 32)
- Place of birth: Lincolnshire, England
- Height: 5 ft 1 in (1.56 m)
- Position: Full-back

Team information
- Current team: Birmingham City
- Number: 2

Senior career*
Years	Team	Apps	(Gls)
2012–2013	Lincoln Ladies	16	(0)
2014–2018	Liverpool	43	(0)
2018–2022	Manchester United	34	(1)
2022–	Birmingham City	46	(3)

International career^{‡}
2013	England U19	8	(0)
2014	England U20	3	(1)
- * Club domestic league appearances and goals as of 2 May 2026 ‡ National team caps and goals as of 31 January 2025

Martha Harris (born 19 August 1994) is an English professional footballer who plays as a full-back for Women's Super League club Birmingham City.

Harris has represented England at under-19, under-20 and under-23 level and was named the inaugural PFA Women's Young Player of the Year in 2014.

== Club career ==
=== Lincoln Ladies ===
Harris made her league debut for Lincoln Ladies (since re-located and re-branded as Notts County) on 26 August 2012 in a FA WSL match against Liverpool, coming on as a 59th-minute substitute for Bonnie Horwood. In all, she made three substitute appearances in the 2012 WSL season, with the team managed by her father Glen Harris. The following season saw new manager Rick Passmore take charge of the team, and this coincided with Harris becoming a key part of the Lincoln first team, making twelve starts and one substitute appearance in the Lady Imps' fourteen league games.

=== Liverpool ===
Her performances in the 2013 season were enough to earn a move to Liverpool, where she signed a two-year contract. She also became the first ever winner of the PFA Women's Young Player of the Year award in April 2014. In Harris's first season at Liverpool, they retained their WSL title on the final day of the season. She also represented Liverpool in the UEFA Women's Champions League.

Harris was ever-present in the 2015 FA WSL season but the club limped to a seventh-place finish. In November 2015, she signed a new contract with Liverpool. On 12 May 2016, she was named Liverpool Ladies Player of the Season.

=== Manchester United ===
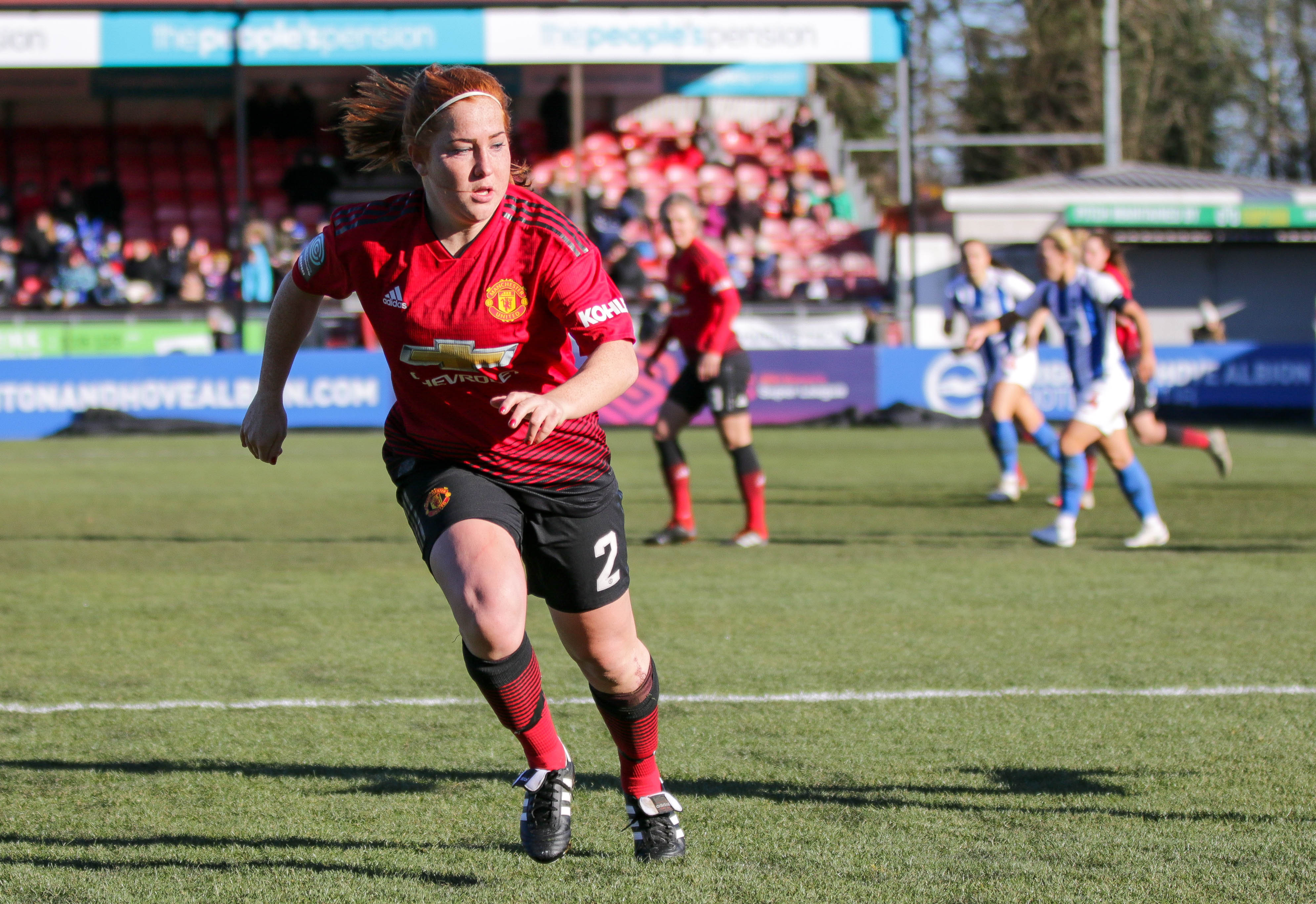
Harris playing for Manchester United against Brighton & Hove Albion in 2019.

On 13 July 2018, it was announced that Harris was joining Manchester United for their inaugural season. On 9 September, she made her debut for the club in a 12–0 away victory over Aston Villa in the Championship. She scored her first goal for the club on 28 April 2019, a penalty in a 5–0 away win against Millwall Lionesses.

Having been limited to three appearances in all competitions including one 10 minute substitute appearance in the league during the 2021–22 season, it was announced that Harris would be leaving upon the expiry of her contract in June 2022.

=== Birmingham City ===
On 14 July 2022, Harris signed a one-year contract plus an additional option year with newly-relegated Championship side Birmingham City. On 18 April 2024, she underwent surgery on her right hamstring and had begun her rehabilitation.

== International career ==
Harris was part of the England under-19 team who finished as runners-up to France at the 2013 UEFA Women's Under-19 Championship in Wales.

In her first season with Liverpool, she was called up to the under-20 squad for the 2014 FIFA U-20 Women's World Cup. She scored in England's opening match, a 1–1 draw with South Korea, but the next two matches were lost and England went out in the first round. Harris then graduated to the under-23 team.

== Personal life ==
Harris comes from a footballing family in Scothern, who in 2011 were all associated with Lincoln Ladies or Lincoln City. Her father Glen Harris had two spells as manager of Lincoln Ladies and later managed Doncaster Rovers Belles, before joining Manchester United as an assistant manager in 2018. Older sister Megan was club captain at Lincoln until quitting football when she became pregnant with twins in 2014. Megan is married to former England captain Casey Stoney. Younger brother Liam was a youth team player at Lincoln City, and Martha's twin sister Emily plays recreationally, though she was formerly a teammate of Martha's at Lincoln.

== Career statistics ==
=== Club ===
As of match played 30 September 2026

Appearances and goals by club, season and competition
Club	Season	League			FA Cup (Note: Includes the Women's FA Cup)		League Cup (Note: Includes the WSL Cup/Women's League Cup)		Europe (Note: Includes the UEFA Women's Champions League)		Total	
Club	Season	Division	Apps	Goals	Apps	Goals	Apps	Goals	Apps	Goals	Apps	Goals
Lincoln Ladies	2012	Women's Super League	3	0	0	0	2	1	—		5	1
Lincoln Ladies	2013	Women's Super League	13	0	0	0	5	0	—		18	0
Lincoln Ladies	Total		16	0	0	0	7	1	0	0	23	1
Liverpool	2014	Women's Super League	10	0	0	0	2	0	2	0	14	0
Liverpool	2015	Women's Super League	14	0	0	0	5	0	2	0	21	0
Liverpool	2016	Women's Super League	3	0	0	0	0	0	—		3	0
Liverpool	2017–18	Women's Super League	16	0	1	1	3	0	—		20	1
Liverpool	Total		43	0	1	1	10	0	4	0	58	1
Manchester United	2018–19	Women's Championship	15	1	3	0	4	0	—		22	1
Manchester United	2019–20	Women's Super League	11	0	0	0	5	0	—		16	0
Manchester United	2020–21	Women's Super League	7	0	1	0	0	0	—		8	0
Manchester United	2021–22	Women's Super League	1	0	1	0	1	0	—		3	0
Manchester United	Total		34	1	5	0	10	0	0	0	49	1
Birmingham City F.C.	2022–23	Women's Championship	10	1	2	0	0	0	—		12	1
Birmingham City F.C.	2023–24	Women's Championship	11	1	1	0	2	1	—		14	2
Birmingham City F.C.	2024–25	Women's Championship	11	0	0	0	3	0	—		14	0
Birmingham City F.C.	2025–26	Women's Super League 2	14	1	0	0	3	0	—		17	1
Birmingham City F.C.	2026–27	Women's Super League	0	0	0	0	2	0	—		2	0
Birmingham City F.C.	Total		46	3	3	0	10	1	—		59	4
Career total			139	3	9	1	37	2	4	0	189	8

== Honours ==
Liverpool

- FA Women's Super League: 2014

Manchester United

- FA Women's Championship: 2018–19

Birmingham City

- Women's Super League 2: 2025–26

Individual

- PFA FA WSL 1 Team of the Year: 2013–14
- PFA Women's Young Player of the Year: 2014
- Liverpool Ladies Players' Player of the Season: 2016
