= Suzu Amano =

Japanese footballer (born 2004)

Suzu Amano 天野 紗
Personal information
- Date of birth: 18 February 2004 (age 22)
- Place of birth: Kyoto Prefecture, Japan
- Height: 1.60 m (5 ft 3 in)
- Position: Central midfielder

Team information
- Current team: Birmingham City
- Number: 14

Senior career*
Years	Team	Apps	(Gls)
2021–2024	Kobe Leonessa	34	(0)
2024–2025	Hammarby	4	(1)
2025	→ Växjö (loan)	18	(3)
2026	Växjö	13	(1)
2026–	Birmingham City	4	(1)
Medal record
Women's football
Representing Japan
FIFA U-20 Women's World Cup
Runner-up	Colombia 2024
- * Club domestic league appearances and goals as of 4 October 2026

Suzu Amano (天野紗, Amano Suzu; pronounced [a.ma.no sɯ̟.zɯ̟]; born 18 February 2004) is a Japanese professional footballer who plays as a central midfielder for Women's Super League (WSL) club Birmingham City.

== Club career ==
=== Kobe Leonessa ===
Amano made her WE League debut on 12 September 2021.

=== Hammarby ===
On 26 June 2024, Amano was presented by Swedish club Hammarby IF..

==== Loan to Växjö ====
For the 2025 season, Amano was on loan to the Damallsvenskan team Växjö. In which she managed to score 3 goals and 2 assists in 18 games.

=== Växjö ===
At the end of 2025 the club announced that Amano had signed a two-year contract with them. In early August it was reported in Swedish local newspaper Smålandsposten that Amano was prohibited to play due to visa related issues. However, on August 7th, hours before Växjö's match against fellow Damallsvenskan team FC Rosengård, it was reported that she was cleared to play. She was later sold to Birmingham City at the end of August, setting a new reported record outgoing sale for Växjö.

=== Birmingham City ===
On 28 August 2026, Amano moved to England to join Women's Super League side Birmingham City.
