= Birmingham City W.F.C. =

Semi-professional English Women's football club

Birmingham City Women F.C.
- Full name: Birmingham City Women Football Club
- Nickname: The Blues
- Founded: 1968; 58 years ago
- Ground: St Andrew's
- Capacity: 29,409
- Coordinates: 52°28′33″N 1°52′5″W
- Chairman: Tom Wagner
- General manager: Sarah Westwood
- Head Coach: Amy Merricks
- League: Women's Super League
- 2025–26: WSL 2, 1st of 12 (promoted)
- Website: bcfc.com/women
Home colours	Away colours	Third colours

Birmingham City Women F.C. is an English women's football club affiliated with Birmingham City F.C. As founding members of the FA Women's Super League in 2011, the team currently plays in the highest division of women's football in England. The team plays their home games at St Andrew's, the home of Birmingham City F.C.

== History ==
The club was formed in 1968 by a group of female fans who played local friendly matches until 1970. They joined the Heart of England League in 1970, and played in the league until 1973 when it underwent a major restructure and become known as the West Midland Regional League in 1974. The club were successful during this period, winning these leagues five times during the entire 1970s and 1980s (1971–72, 1974–75, 1976–77, 1987–88, 1988–89), amongst other trophies. They reached the semi-final of the Women's FA Cup in 1974 and 1988.

The club ran into difficult times during the 1990s, with many staff and player changes. In an effort to regain stability they created an academy of young players, many who eventually played for the senior team.

In 1998 Birmingham City were elevated to the newly created Midland Combination League and in their first season won the league, gaining automatic promotion into the FA Women's Premier League Northern Division. After two seasons, Birmingham were promoted to the top flight of women's football in England, joining the FA Women's Premier League National Division in 2002. Also in 2001–02 Birmingham upset Doncaster Belles 4–3 in the FA Women's Premier League Cup semi-final. In the final at Adams Park, Wycombe, Birmingham were thrashed 7–1 by full-time professional Fulham Ladies.

In March 2003, local sports reporter Gary Newbon criticised women's football and bet the club £500 that they could not attract 500 supporters to their upcoming match against Doncaster Belles. Humiliated Newbon lost his bet. The academy had begun to produce players for the first team at this point, and Laura Bassett became the first Birmingham City Ladies player, from the academy or otherwise, to appear for England at full international level.

The club's high-profile manager of the time, Marcus Bignot, signed big name players including Rachel Yankey and Alex Scott for the 2004–05 season and Birmingham finished fourth. The club ran into financial problems when Karren Brady of Birmingham City's men reneged on a letter of intent to provide funding. The female club had to let major players go before the start of the 2005–06 season, which they finished in sixth position. They were only able to continue after a player's parent donated £10,000.

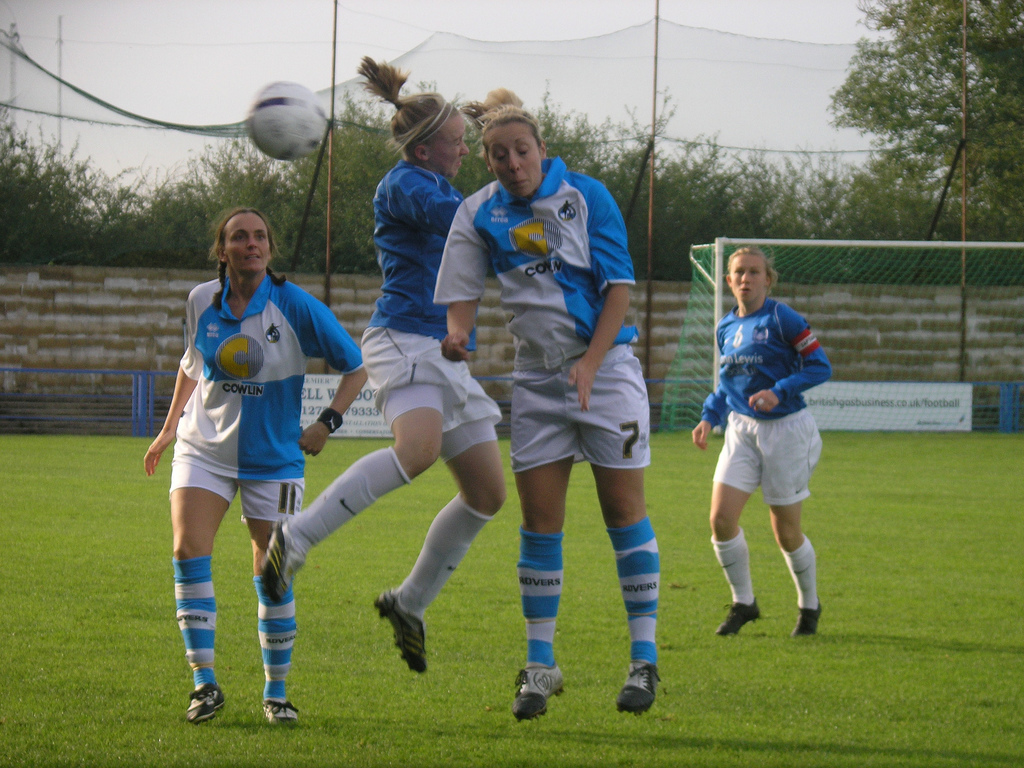
Birmingham against Bristol Academy, 2006

Also in 2005, the club's junior sides joined the newly formed Centre of Excellence league in the Central Warwickshire area. Birmingham won their eighth consecutive Birmingham FA County Cup in 2008 before a number of established players either retired from the game or moved on to other clubs. They began to rebuild and finished 2008–09 in fifth place (losing out on fourth place only through inferior goal difference). Also in 2005 the club left Redditch United's The Valley Stadium for Stratford Town's DCS Stadium.

=== FA WSL era ===
In March 2010 the club was announced as a founder member of the FA WSL. The club's successful application was underwritten by Birmingham City's controversial new owner Carson Yeung. In December 2010, Birmingham City announced the signing of several international players to their WSL squad. In June 2011 the Centre of Excellence's future was secured with the allocation of a new FA licence for 2011–12 season onwards; which realigned the current development pathway for women's football in England.

The club became inaugural members of the newly formed FA WSL in 2011 and came close to winning it at the first attempt, leading for most of the campaign before being overhauled by Arsenal. They also reached the Continental Cup Final but once again found Arsenal in the way at Burton Albion F.C. The season was notable for the goalscoring exploits of Rachel Williams who scored the league's first ever hat-trick, finished as leading scorer and won the FA Players' Player of the Year Award.

Due to their 2nd-place finish in the 2011 FA WSL Birmingham qualified for a place in the 2012–13 UEFA Women's Champions League round of 32 for the first time in their history. Drawn against Italians Bardolino Verona, Birmingham won the first leg 2–0 but lost 3–0 at the Stadio Marc'Antonio Bentegodi, after extra time, to exit the competition at the first hurdle.

In May 2012 the club won their first FA Women's Cup, beating Chelsea on penalties in the final at Ashton Gate in Bristol. Also in 2012, for the second consecutive year, the club finished 2nd in the FA WSL and were runners-up in the Continental Cup Final, both to Arsenal. The 2nd-place finish in the league qualified Birmingham for the 2013–14 UEFA Women's Champions League round of 32.

Birmingham defeated PK-35 Vantaa and Zorky Krasnogorsk to qualify for an all-English quarter-final against Arsenal. A 1–0 win at home and a 2–0 win in London sent the club through to a semi-final against Tyresö FF. Birmingham manager David Parker described big-spending Tyresö as female "galácticos" before the tie, which the Swedes won 3–0 on aggregate. The club underwent another stadium change in 2014, leaving the DCS Stadium for Solihull Moors' The Autotech Stadium.

=== Integration with men's side ===
The club became fully integrated into men's side Birmingham City Football Club in November 2016. Prior to the 2017 FA WSL Spring Series, long-time manager David Parker resigned. The club's Regional Talent Club technical director Marc Skinner was promoted to first-team manager shortly thereafter.

The Blues finished 5th in the 2017/2018 season, narrowly missing out on 4th on the final day of the season with a draw against Reading, with Ellen White finishing as highest scorer in the league with 15 goals. Freda Ayisi, Coral-Jade Haines and Maddy Cusack were released shortly after.

In July 2018, the club rebranded as Birmingham City Women F.C. Marc Skinner left in January 2019, to take the head coach job at American National Women's Soccer League (NWSL) club Orlando Pride. He was replaced by Marta Tejedor.

On 3 March 2020, the club parted ways with manager Marta Tejedor by mutual consent and promoted Charlie Baxter to the position of interim head coach. The club finished the 2019—2020 season second from bottom, having lost major stars like Ellen White and Hayley Ladd, as well as upcoming talent like Aoife Mannion to other WSL clubs in the summer transfer window. On 13 August 2020, Birmingham appointed former Sheffield United manager Carla Ward as the new permanent head coach.

In April 2021, the clubs players formally issued a list of complaints to the club's board, stating that the club was "preventing us from performing our jobs to the best of our ability."

Former Glasgow City boss Scott Booth was appointed as Head Coach in July 2021, but a winless start to the season saw him lose his job in November. He was subsequently replaced by former Birmingham City midfielder Darren Carter, who became Interim Head Coach. Despite their best efforts, Birmingham were relegated from the Women's Super League with one game to spare, after a 6–0 defeat away to Manchester City.

== Kit ==
In 2013, a deal was signed with Italian kit manufacturer Legea, who also supplied North Korea, Iran and Zimbabwe. In early 2014, the club announced that Sondico would be the kit supplier until the end of 2015. On 7 March 2016 it was announced that Adidas was taking over as the club's kit supplier for the next four seasons.

== Honours ==
For a detailed international record see English women's football clubs in international competitions

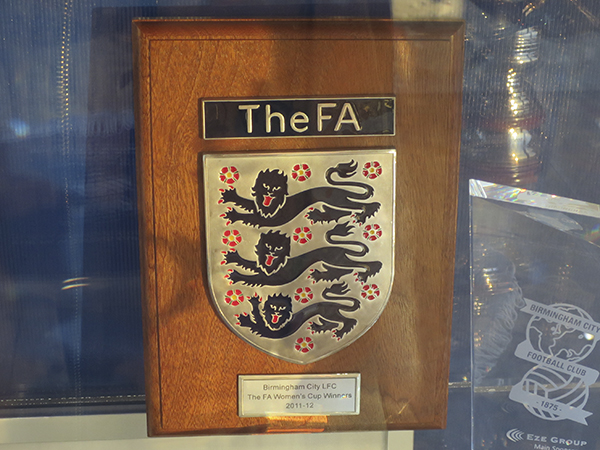
FA Cup Winners Plaque

FA Women's Super League (level 1)

- Runners-up: 2011, 2012

FA Women's National League North/FA WSL 2 (level 2)

- Champions (2): 2001–02 (North), 2025–26

Midland Combination Women's Football League (level 3)

- Champions: 1998–99

Women's FA Cup

- Winners: 2011–12
- Runners up: 2017

FA Women's League Cup

- Runners up: 2011, 2012, 2016

FA Women's National League Cup

- Runners up: 2001–02

Heart of England League

- Champions: 1971/72

West Midland Regional League

- Champions: 1974/75, 1976/77, 1987/88, 1988/89

== First-team squad ==
=== Current squad ===
As of 29 August 2026

Note: Flags indicate national team as defined under FIFA eligibility rules; some limited exceptions apply. Players may hold more than one non-FIFA nationality.

No.	Pos.	Nation	Player
1	GK	ENG	Lucy Thomas
2	DF	ENG	Martha Harris
3	DF	CAN	Marie Levasseur
4	DF	FRA	Jade Rastocle
6	DF	ENG	Shannon Cooke
7	FW	KOR	Lee Geum-min
8	MF	NOR	Lisa Naalsund
9	FW	NIR	Simone Magill
10	MF	SWE	Wilma Leidhammar
15	DF	NIR	Rebecca Holloway
16	FW	ENG	Lily Crosthwaite

No.	Pos.	Nation	Player
18	DF	NIR	Rebecca McKenna
19	MF	SCO	Chelsea Cornet
20	MF	FRA	Chancelle Effa Effa
21	DF	ENG	Millie Turner (captain)
22	DF	FRA	Océane Hurtré
23	GK	ENG	Sophie Baggaley
26	MF	JPN	Asato Miyagawa
27	MF	GRE	Veatriki Sarri
29	FW	HAI	Batcheba Louis
30	DF	ENG	Neve Herron
40	GK	ENG	Katie Startup
—	MF	JPN	Suzu Amano

=== Out on loan ===
Note: Flags indicate national team as defined under FIFA eligibility rules; some limited exceptions apply. Players may hold more than one non-FIFA nationality.

No.	Pos.	Nation	Player
32	FW	ENG	Ava Baker (at Ipswich Town)
36	DF	ENG	Ebonie Locke (at Hearts)

== Club officials ==
Front office

- General Manager: Sarah Westwood
- Operations Manager: Kyle Adams

Coaching staff

- Head coach: Amy Merricks
- Assistant head coach: Mark Beard
- Technical director: Hope Powell
- Lead Goalkeeping coach: Ben Chapman
- Performance and Recruitment analyst: António Adolfo Magalhães
- Head of Sports Science: Lewis Gordon

== Managers ==
As of 20 April, 2026:

Name	Tenure	Refs
(England) Marcus Bignot	1998 – 2005	
(England) David Parker	2011 – 2016	
(England) Marc Skinner	14 December 2016 – 14 January 2019	
(Spain) Marta Tejedor	January 2019 – 3 March 2020	
Charlie Baxter (interim)	3 March 2020 – 13 August 2020	
(England) Carla Ward	13 August 2020 – 16 May 2021	
(Scotland) Scott Booth	30 June 2021 – 18 November 2021	
(England) Tony Elliott (interim)	18 November 2021 – 21 November 2021	
(England) Darren Carter (Note: Carter was initially appointed as interim manager; he was given the job permanently in 2022.)	21 November 2021 – 11 April 2024	
(England) Amy Merricks	15 April 2024 –	

== See also ==
- Current and former Birmingham City W.F.C. players
- List of women's association football clubs in England and Wales
- Women's football in England
- List of women's association football clubs
