= List of foreign Women's Super League players =

The Women's Super League (WSL) is the highest league of women's football in England. The league, which started in 2011, was divided in two separate divisions (WSL 1 and WSL 2) from 2014 with the latter rebranded as the FA Women's Championship following a restructure in 2019; only the WSL 1 is considered in this list. The following players must meet both of the following two criteria:

1. Have played at least one WSL game. Players who were signed by WSL clubs, but only played in lower leagues, cup games and/or European games, or did not play in any competitive games at all, are not included.
2. Are considered foreign, i.e., outside United Kingdom determined by the following:

A player is considered foreign if they are not eligible to play for the national teams of England, Scotland, Wales or Northern Ireland.

More specifically:

- If a player has been capped on international level, the national team is used; if they have been capped by more than one country, the highest level (or the most recent) team is used. These include British players with dual citizenship.
- If a player has not been capped on international level, their country of birth is used, except those who were born abroad from British parents or moved to the United Kingdom at a young age, and those who clearly indicated to have switched their nationality to another nation.

Clubs listed are those for which the player has played at least one WSL game. Seasons are those in which the player has played at least one Women's Super League game. Note that seasons, not calendar years, are used. Until the end of the 2017 spring series, seasons were aligned with calendar years and therefore one year may be listed. Beginning with the 2017–18 season, seasons were played across two years. For example, "2017–22" indicates that the player has played in every season from 2017–18 to 2021–22, but not necessarily every calendar year from 2017 to 2022. Therefore, a player who debuted during or after the 2017–18 season should always have a listing of least two years – for instance, a player making their debut in 2019, during the 2018–19 season, will have '2018–19' after their name despite not playing in 2018. Similarly, a player making their debut in 2019, during the 2019–20 season, will have '2019–20' after their name but this does not necessarily mean they played in 2020.

In bold: players who are currently under contract by a WSL club. For each country, the leading appearance-maker is indicated by the number of matches that they played in the Women's Super League as of the end of the 2023–24 season.

47 different nations have been represented in the WSL by 500 players. The Republic of Ireland is the most represented nation with 45 players. Algeria was the most recent nation to be newly-represented when Inès Belloumou made her WSL debut playing for West Ham United on 12 September 2025 against Arsenal.

As of 6 December 2025.

== Africa (CAF) ==
=== Algeria ===
- **Inès Belloumou** – **West Ham United** – 2025–

=== Cameroon ===
- Easther Mayi Kith (**8**) – Reading – 2022–23

=== Equatorial Guinea ===
- Jade Boho (**14**) – Bristol Academy, Reading – 2015–16

=== Ghana ===
- Freda Ayisi – Arsenal, Birmingham City – 2013–18
- Chantelle Boye-Hlorkah (**79**) – Everton, Aston Villa – 2013, 2017–23

=== Morocco ===
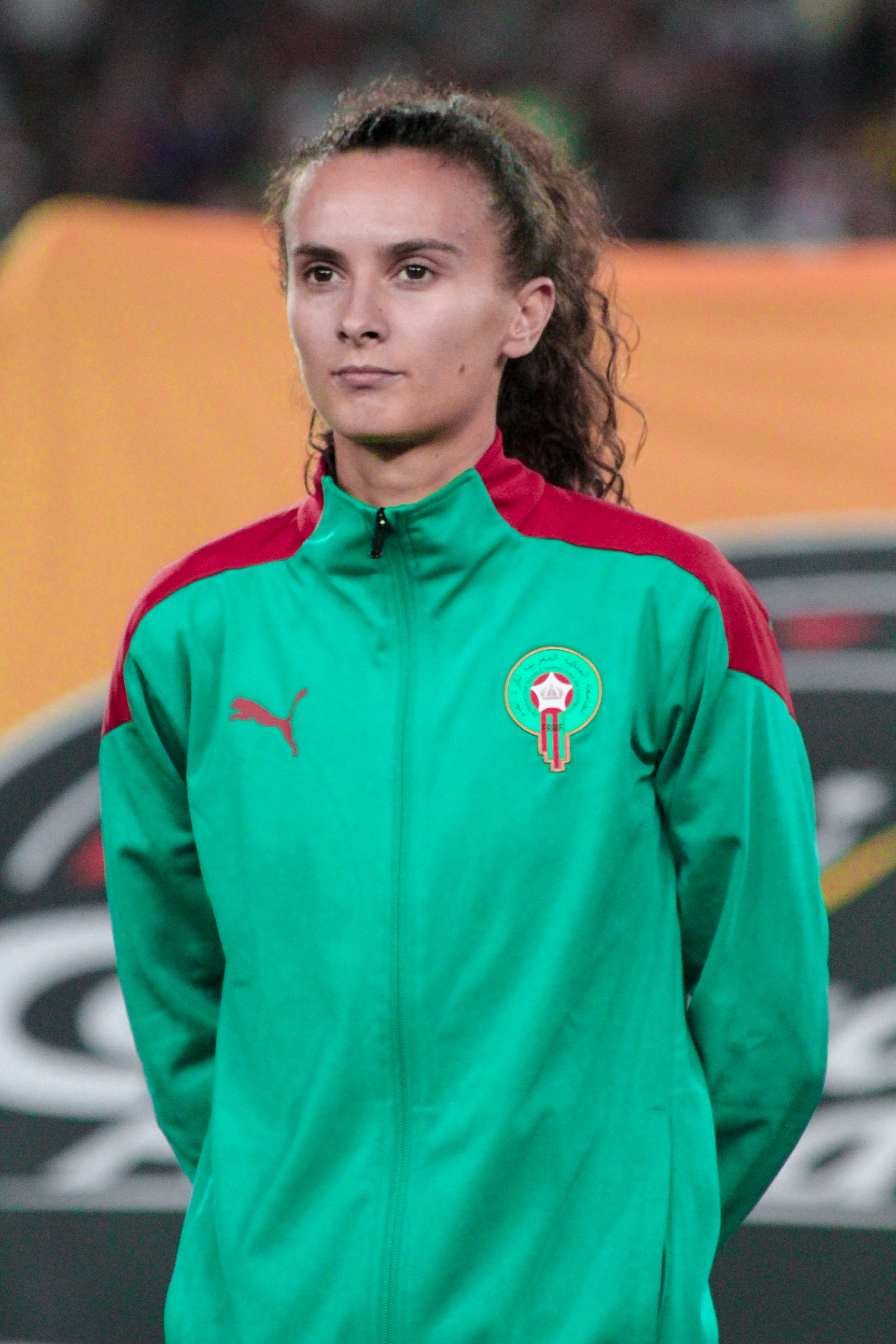
Rosella Ayane has the most WSL appearances of any African player with 97. A former England youth international, she made her Morocco debut in 2021.

- **Rosella Ayane** (**101**) – Chelsea, Bristol City, Tottenham Hotspur, **Leicester City W.F.C.** – 2013–14, 2018–
- Anissa Lahmari – Reading – 2017

=== Nigeria ===
- Rinsola Babajide – Liverpool, Brighton & Hove Albion – 2017–20, 2021–22
- **Rofiat Imuran** – London City Lionesses, **Aston Villa** – 2025–
- **Chiamaka Nnadozie** – **Brighton & Hove Albion** – 2025–
- Asisat Oshoala – Liverpool, Arsenal – 2015–16
- **Toni Payne** – **Everton** – 2024–
- Ashleigh Plumptre (**44**) – Notts County, Leicester City – 2014–15, 2021–23
- Ini-Abasi Umotong – Brighton & Hove Albion – 2018–20

=== Tanzania ===
- **Aisha Masaka** (**1**) – **Brighton & Hove Albion** – 2024–

== Asia (AFC) ==
=== Australia ===
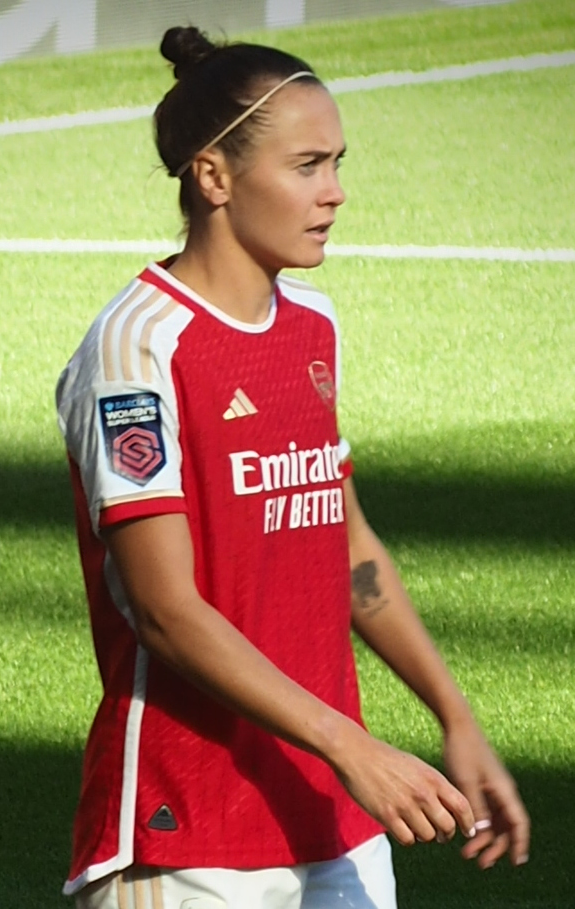
Caitlin Foord became the first Australian to play in 100 WSL games, reaching the milestone on 12 September 2025.

- Mackenzie Arnold – West Ham United – 2020–24
- Chloe Berryhill (née Logarzo) – Bristol City – 2019–21
- Laura Brock (née Alleway) – Lincoln – 2012
- Danielle Brogan – Notts County – 2014
- **Ellie Carpenter** – **Chelsea** – 2025–
- **Steph Catley** – **Arsenal** – 2020–
- **Kyra Cooney-Cross** – **Arsenal** – 2023–
- Isobel Dalton – Bristol Academy – 2015
- **Leah Davidson** - **Charlton Athletic** - 2026-
- **Caitlin Foord** (**124**) – **Arsenal** – 2020–
- **Mary Fowler** – **Manchester City** – 2022–
- Caitlin Friend – Notts County – 2014
- Jacynta Galabadaarachchi – West Ham United – 2019–20
- Collette Gardiner (née McCallum) – Lincoln – 2012
- Emily Gielnik – Liverpool, Aston Villa – 2012, 2021–23
- Katrina Gorry – West Ham United – 2023–26
- Charli Grant – Tottenham Hotspur – 2024–26
- Alexandra Gummer – Doncaster Rovers Belles – 2016
- **Clare Hunt** – **Tottenham Hotspur** – 2024–
- **Grace Johnston** - **Charlton Athletic** - 2026-
- **Alanna Kennedy** – Tottenham Hotspur, Manchester City, **London City Lionesses** – 2020–25, 2025–
- Sam Kerr – Chelsea – 2019–24, 2025–26
- Aivi Luik – Notts County – 2016
- Ella Mastrantonio – Bristol City – 2020–21
- **Holly McNamara** – **Everton** – 2026–
- Teagan Micah – Liverpool – 2023–25
- Courtney Nevin – Leicester City – 2022–25
- Tanya Oxtoby – Doncaster Rovers Belles – 2012
- Hayley Raso – Everton, Manchester City, Tottenham Hotspur – 2020–23, 2024–25
- **Charlize Rule** – **Brighton & Hove Albion** – 2023–
- Remy Siemsen – Leicester City – 2022–24
- Kyah Simon – Tottenham Hotspur – 2021–23
- **Emily van Egmond** – West Ham United, Leicester City, **Charlton Athletic**– 2020–21, 2025-
- **Clare Wheeler** – **Everton** – 2022–
- Lydia Williams – Arsenal, Brighton & Hove Albion – 2020–23
- Tameka Yallop (née Butt) – West Ham United – 2021–22

=== China PR ===
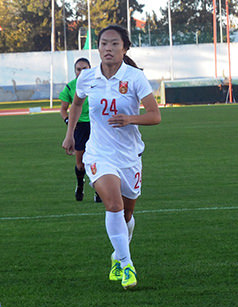
In 2021, Tang Jiali became the first Chinese national to play in the WSL.

- Tang Jiali – Tottenham Hotspur – 2021–22
- Zhang Linyan – Tottenham Hotspur – 2023–24
- Li Mengwen (21) – Brighton & Hove Albion, West Ham United – 2023–2025
- Wang Shuang – Tottenham Hotspur – 2023–24

=== Japan ===
- **Suzu Amano** - **Birmingham City** - 2026-
- **Yu Endo** - **West Ham United** – 2025–
- **Aoba Fujino** – **Manchester City** – 2024–
- **Maika Hamano** – **Chelsea**, **Tottenham Hotspur (loan)** – 2023–
- **Yui Hasegawa** (**81**) – West Ham United, **Manchester City** – 2021–
- **Honoka Hayashi** – West Ham United, **Everton** – 2022–
- **Maya Hijikata** – **Aston Villa** – 2025–
- **Rion Ishikawa** – **Everton** – 2025–
- Mana Iwabuchi – Aston Villa, Arsenal, Tottenham Hotspur – 2020–23
- Yukari Kinga – Arsenal – 2014
- **Hikaru Kitagawa** – **Everton** – 2025–
- **Tōko Koga** – **Tottenham Hotspur** – 2025–
- **Saki Kumagai** – **London City Lionesses** – 2025–
- **Moeka Minami** – **Brighton & Hove Albion** – 2025–
- **Asato Miyagawa** - **Birmingham City** - 2026-
- **Hinata Miyazawa** – **Manchester United** – 2023–
- **Yuka Momiki** – Leicester City, **Everton** – 2023–
- **Fuka Nagano** – **Liverpool** – 2022–
- Yūki Nagasato – Chelsea – 2013–14
- Shinobu Ohno – Arsenal – 2014
- **Akane Ōkuma** - **Aston Villa** - 2026-
- **Aemu Oyama** – **Manchester City** – 2024–
- **Kiko Seike** – **Brighton & Hove Albion** – 2024–
- **Risa Shimizu** – West Ham United, **Manchester City**, **Liverpool (loan)** – 2022–
- Saori Takarada – Leicester City – 2023–25
- **Fuka Tsunoda** - **Brighton & Hove Albion** – 2025–
- **Riko Ueki** – **West Ham United** – 2023–
- **Ayaka Yamashita** – **Manchester City** – 2024–
- **Manaka Matsukubo** – **Chelsea** – 2026–

=== Philippines ===
- Maz Pacheco - Everton - 2025-

=== South Korea ===
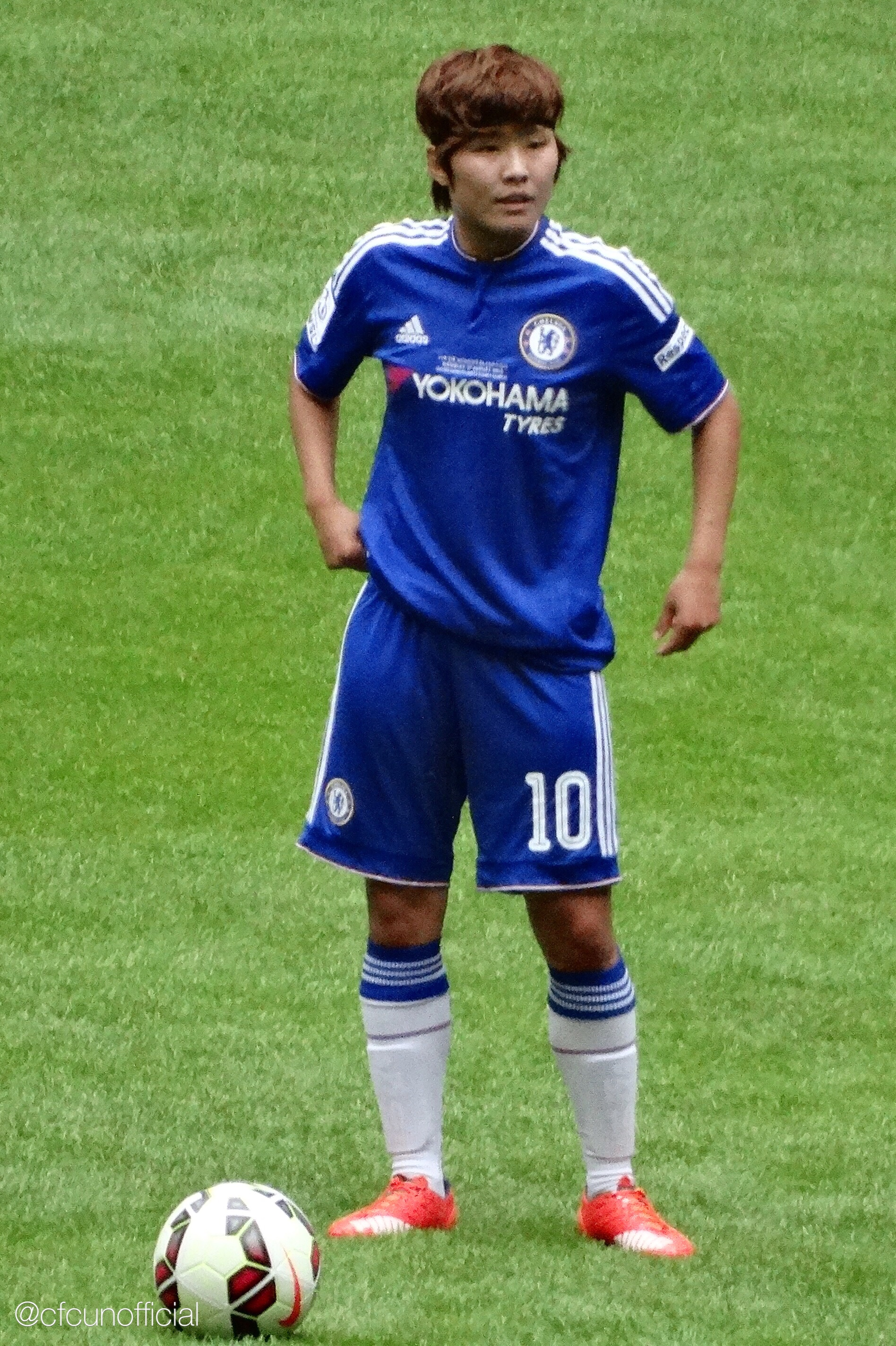
Ji So-yun made 124 appearances and won six WSL titles with Chelsea.

- Cho So-hyun – West Ham United, Tottenham Hotspur – 2018–23
- Jeon Ga-eul – Bristol City, Reading – 2019–22
- Ji So-yun (**124**) – Chelsea – 2014–22
- **Lee Geum-min** – Manchester City, Brighton & Hove Albion, **Birmingham City**– 2019–24, 2026-
- Park Ye-eun – Brighton & Hove Albion – 2022–23

=== Syria ===
- Nor Mustafa (**9**) – West Ham United – 2020–21

== Europe (UEFA) ==
=== Austria ===
- **Verena Hanshaw** (née Aschauer) – **West Ham United** – 2024–
- **Marie Höbinger** – **Liverpool** – 2023–
- Simona Koren – Sunderland – 2017–18
- Viktoria Schnaderbeck – Arsenal, Tottenham Hotspur – 2018–22
- **Laura Wienroither** – Arsenal, **Manchester City** – 2022–
- Manuela Zinsberger (88) – Arsenal – 2019–26

=== Belgium ===
- Julie Biesmans – Bristol City – 2017–19
- Janice Cayman – Leicester City – 2023–26
- Yana Daniëls (**106**) – Bristol City, Liverpool – 2017–25
- Nicky Evrard – Brighton & Hove Albion – 2023–24
- Sari Kees – Leicester City – 2024–26
- Amber Tysiak – West Ham United – 2022–26
- Lorca van de Putte – Bristol City – 2017–18
- Justine Vanhaevermaet – Reading, Everton – 2021–25
- Tessa Wullaert – Manchester City – 2018–20

=== Bulgaria ===
- Evdokiya Popadinova (**4**) – Bristol Academy – 2015

=== Czechia ===
- Kateřina Svitková (**37**) – West Ham United, Chelsea – 2020–23
- Barbora Votíková – Tottenham Hotspur – 2023–24

=== Denmark ===
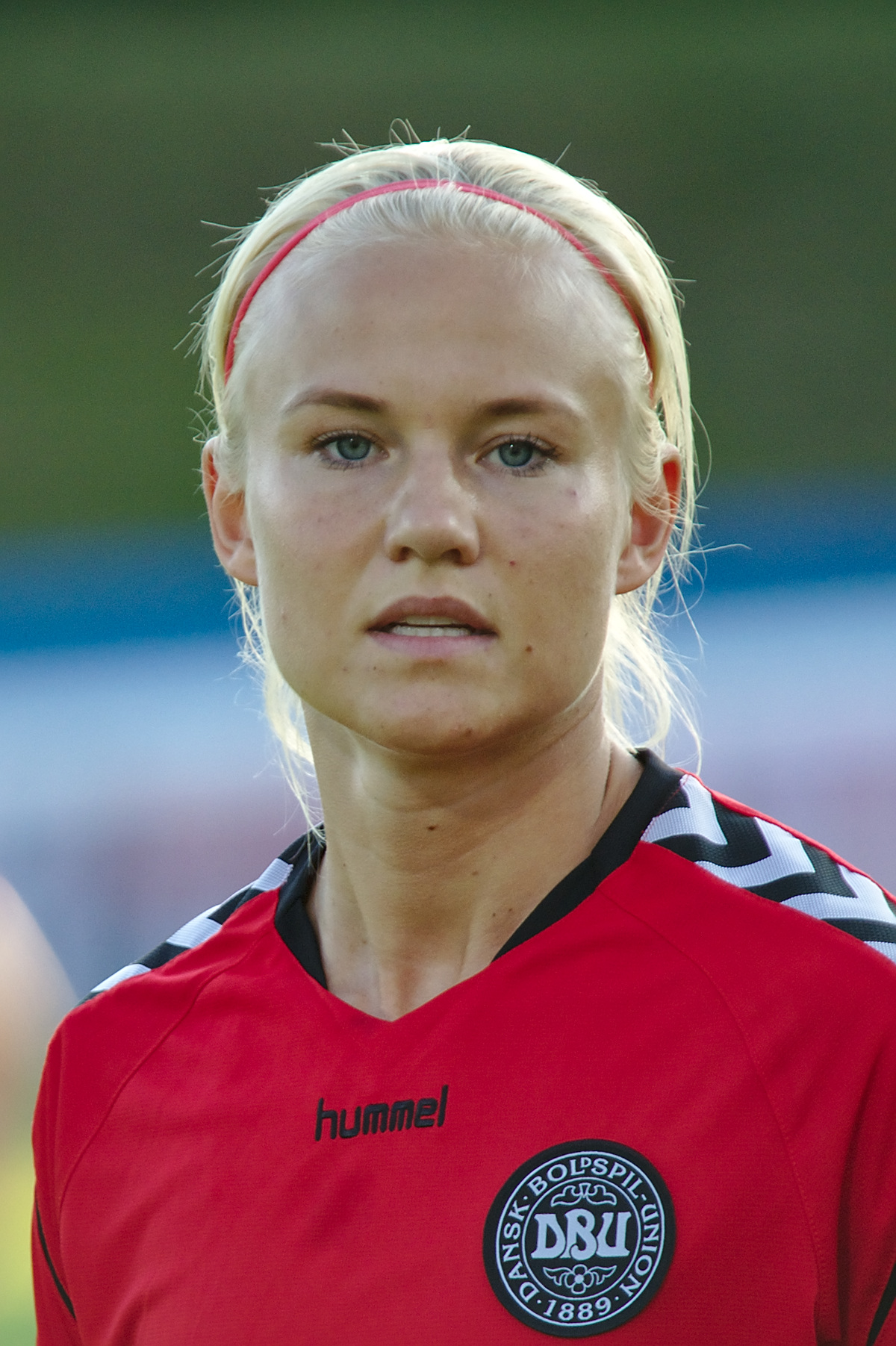
Following a world record fee move, Pernille Harder played three seasons in the WSL, winning the title with Chelsea in all three.

- Janni Arnth – Arsenal – 2018–19
- Simone Boye Sørensen – Arsenal – 2021–22
- Signe Bruun – Manchester United – 2021–22
- Nina Frausing Pedersen – Liverpool – 2014
- Mille Gejl – Crystal Palace – 2024–25
- Pernille Harder – Chelsea – 2020–23
- **Mathilde Harviken** - **Aston Villa** - 2026-
- **Olivia Holdt** – **Tottenham Hotspur** – 2024–
- **Karen Holmgaard** – **Everton** – 2022–
- Sara Holmgaard – Everton – 2022–25
- Stine Larsen – Aston Villa – 2020–21
- Mie Leth Jans – Manchester City – 2017–18
- **Sofie Lundgaard** – **Liverpool** – 2022–
- Matilde Lundorf – Brighton & Hove Albion – 2019–20
- Rikke Madsen – Everton – 2023–25
- **Malou Marcetto** - **London City Lionesses** – 2026–
- Kathrine Møller Kühl – Arsenal, Everton – 2022–25
- Nadia Nadim – Manchester City – 2017–19
- Karoline Olesen – Everton – 2023–25
- Cecilie Sandvej – Birmingham City – 2021–22
- Rikke Sevecke (**52**) – Everton – 2020–23
- Emma Snerle – West Ham United – 2021–24
- Nicoline Sørensen – Everton – 2020–24
- Sille Struck – Bristol City – 2023–24
- Amalie Thestrup – West Ham United, Bristol City – 2022–24
- Sanne Troelsgaard – Reading – 2021–23
- **Amalie Vangsgaard** - **Aston Villa** - 2026-
- Katrine Veje – Arsenal, Everton, Crystal Palace – 2019–20, 2022–25

=== Finland ===
- **Olga Ahtinen** – **Tottenham Hotspur** – 2023–
- **Sanni Franssi** – **London City Lionesses** – 2025–
- Adelina Engman – Chelsea – 2018–20
- Nora Heroum – Brighton & Hove Albion – 2020–21
- Juliette Kemppi – Bristol City – 2018–19
- Emma Koivisto (**71**) – Brighton & Hove Albion, Liverpool – 2020–24
- **Lotta Lindström** – **London City Lionesses** – 2025–
- Tinja-Riikka Korpela – Everton, Tottenham Hotspur – 2019–23
- Milla-Maj Majasaari – Crystal Palace – 2024–25
- **Eva Nyström** – **West Ham United** – 2024–
- Ria Öling – Crystal Palace – 2024–25
- Jutta Rantala – Leicester City – 2023–26
- **Oona Siren** – **West Ham United** – 2024–
- **Eveliina Summanen** – **Tottenham Hotspur** – 2021–

=== France ===
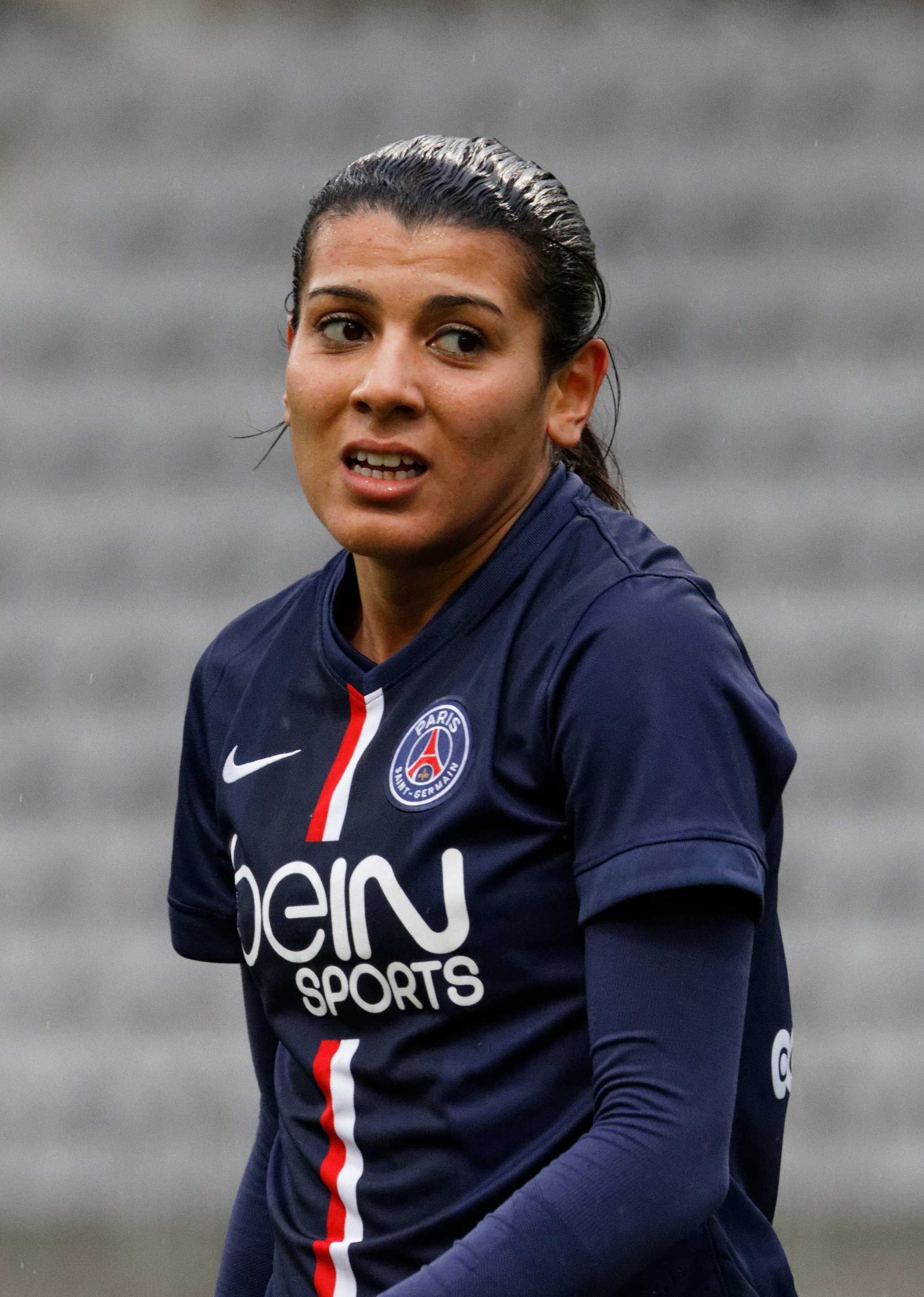
Kenza Dali is France's leading WSL appearance maker.

- **Viviane Asseyi** – **West Ham United** – 2022–
- **Lorena Azzaro** - **Charlton Athletic** - 2026-
- **Sandy Baltimore** – **Chelsea** – 2024–
- Karima Benameur Taieb – Manchester City – 2019–22
- **Delphine Cascarino** – **London City Lionesses** – 2026–
- Estelle Cascarino – Manchester United, West Ham United (loan)– 2022–23, 2026
- Shana Chossenotte – Leicester City – 2024–25
- **Hawa Cissoko** – West Ham United, **Charlton Athletic** – 2020–24, 2026-
- Maéva Clémaron – Everton, Tottenham Hotspur – 2019–22
- Daphne Corboz – Manchester City – 2015–16
- **Océane Deslandes** – **Aston Villa** – 2025–
- Kenza Dali (**100**) – West Ham United, Everton, Aston Villa – 2019–25
- **Chancelle Effa Effa** - **Birmingham City** - 2026-
- **Kelly Gago** – **Everton** – 2024–
- Valérie Gauvin – Everton – 2020–22
- **Grace Geyoro** – **London City Lionesses** – 2025–
- **Océane Hurtré**- **Birmingham City** - 2026-
- **Oriane Jean-François** – Chelsea, **Aston Villa** – 2024–
- Léa Le Garrec – Brighton & Hove Albion – 2019–20
- **Melvine Malard** – **Manchester United** – 2023–
- **Noémie Mouchon** – **Leicester City** – 2024–26
- **Maelys Mpomé** – Chelsea**, Brighton & Hove Albion** – 2024–
- Ève Périsset – Chelsea – 2022–25
- Pauline Peyraud-Magnin – Arsenal – 2018–20
- **Constance Picaud** – **West Ham** – 2026–
- Louna Ribadeira – Everton – 2024–25
- **Wassa Sangaré** – **London City Lionesses** – 2025–
- Julie Thibaud – Leicester City – 2023–26
- Aïssatou Tounkara – Manchester United – 2022–23

=== Germany ===
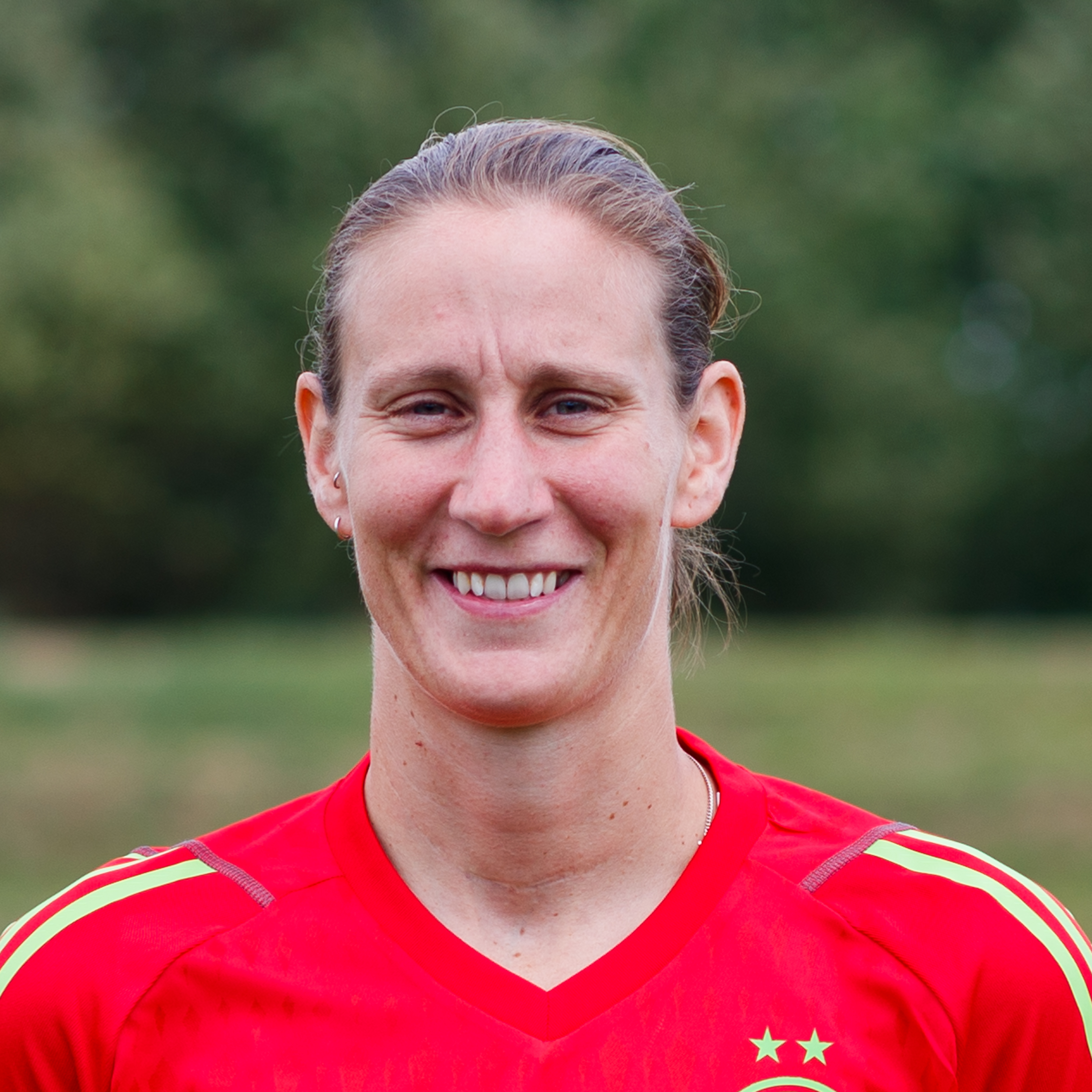
Ann-Katrin Berger won the golden glove in Chelsea's 2020–21 title-winning season with 12 clean sheets.

- **Lisa Baum** - **Arsenal** - 2026-
- Katharina Baunach – West Ham United – 2019–20
- **Anneke Borbe** – **Arsenal** – 2025–
- **Rafaela Borggräfe** – **Liverpool** – 2025–
- Ann-Katrin Berger (**98**) – Birmingham City, Chelsea – 2016–24
- Pauline Bremer – Manchester City, Brighton & Hove Albion – 2017–20, 2023–25
- **Selina Cerci** - **Arsenal** - 2026-
- **Vivien Endemann** – **Liverpool** – 2026–
- Marisa Ewers – Birmingham City, Aston Villa – 2016–19, 2020–22
- Josephine Henning – Arsenal – 2016, 2017–18
- Tabea Kemme – Arsenal – 2018–19
- **Rebecca Knaak** – **Manchester City** – 2024–
- Turid Knaak – Arsenal – 2014
- Janina Leitzig – Leicester City – 2022–
- Melanie Leupolz – Chelsea – 2020–24
- Isabelle Linden – Birmingham City – 2016–18
- **Melina Loeck** – **Brighton & Hove Albion** – 2023–
- **Sydney Lohmann** – **Manchester City** – 2025–
- Leonie Maier – Arsenal, Everton – 2019–23
- **Shekiera Martinez** – West Ham United, **Tottenham Hotspur** – 2024–
- **Sjoeke Nüsken** – **Chelsea** – 2023–
- Lena Petermann – Leicester City – 2023–25
- Ramona Petzelberger – Aston Villa, Tottenham Hotspur – 2020–24
- Anke Preuß – Sunderland, Liverpool – 2017–20
- Kathleen Radtke – Manchester City – 2014–15
- Nicole Rolser – Liverpool – 2013–15
- Corina Schröder – Liverpool, Birmingham City – 2013–16
- **Lea Schüller** – **Manchester United** – 2025–
- Caroline Siems – Aston Villa – 2020–21
- Julia Simic – West Ham United – 2018–20
- Laura Vetterlein – West Ham United – 2019–21
- Lisa Weiß – Aston Villa – 2020–21

=== Greece ===
- **Veatriki Sarri** (81) – **Birmingham City**, Brighton & Hove Albion, Everton – 2020–2025, 2026–

=== Hungary ===
- **Anna Csiki** (**8**) – **Tottenham Hotspur, West Ham United (loan)** – 2024–
- **Gloria Siber** - **Charlton Athletic** - 2026-

=== Iceland ===
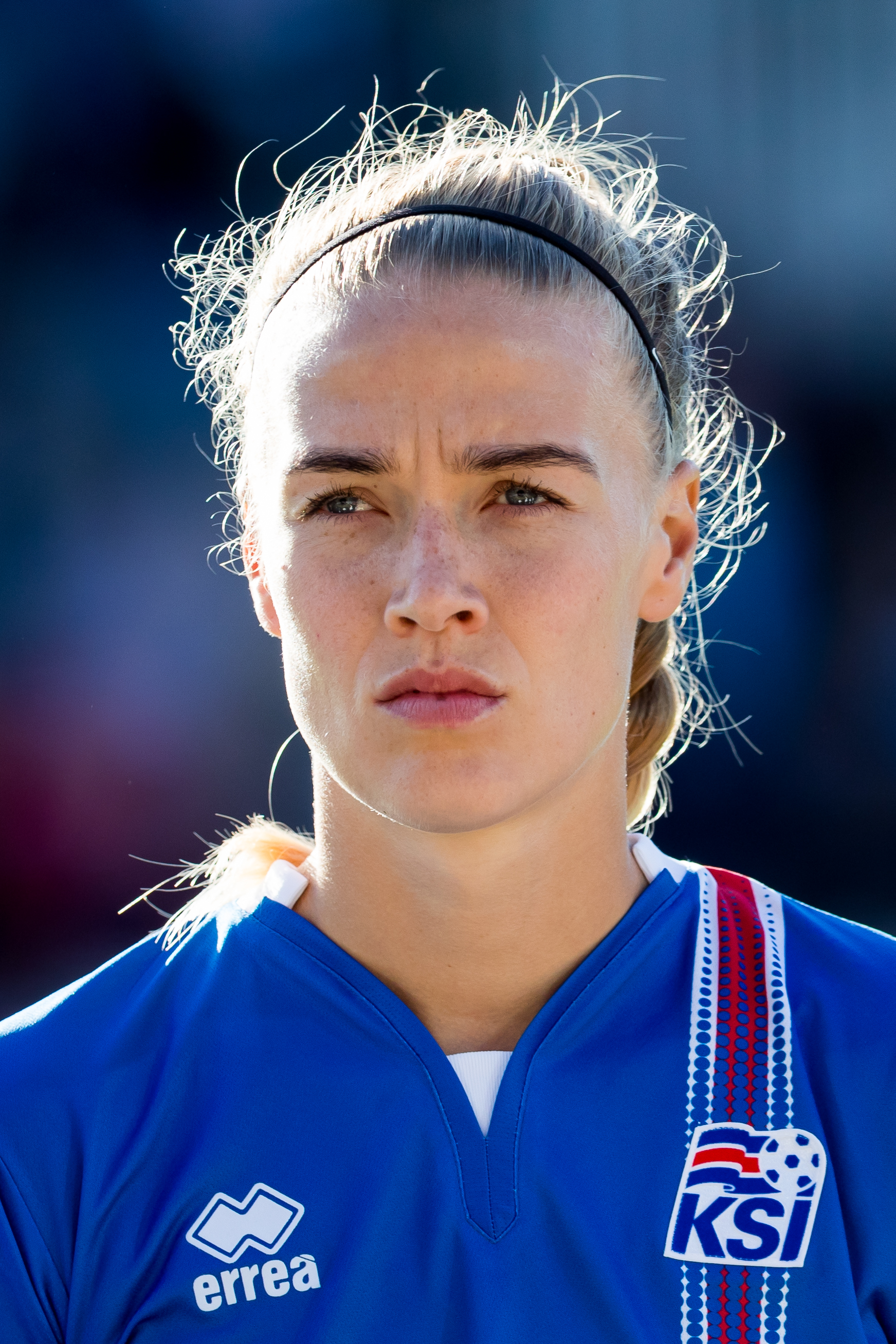
Dagný Brynjarsdóttir is Iceland's leading appearance maker in the WSL and was named West Ham United captain in 2022.

- Dagný Brynjarsdóttir (68) – West Ham United – 2020–23, 2024–25
- Hlín Eiríksdóttir – Leicester City – 2024–26
- Edda Garðarsdóttir – Chelsea – 2013
- Rakel Hönnudóttir – Reading – 2018–20
- **Cassandra Korhonen** - **Charlton Athletic** - 2026-
- Katrín Ómarsdóttir – Liverpool, Doncaster Rovers Belles – 2013–16
- Ólína Guðbjörg Viðarsdóttir – Chelsea – 2013

=== Italy ===
- **Aurora Galli** (**59**) – **Everton** – 2021–
- **Elena Linari** – **London City Lionesses** – 2025–
- Martina Piemonte – Everton – 2023–24

=== Kosovo ===
- Elizabeta Ejupi (**3**) – Notts County – 2016

=== Malta ===
- Emma Lipman (**15**) – Manchester City – 2014–15

=== Netherlands ===
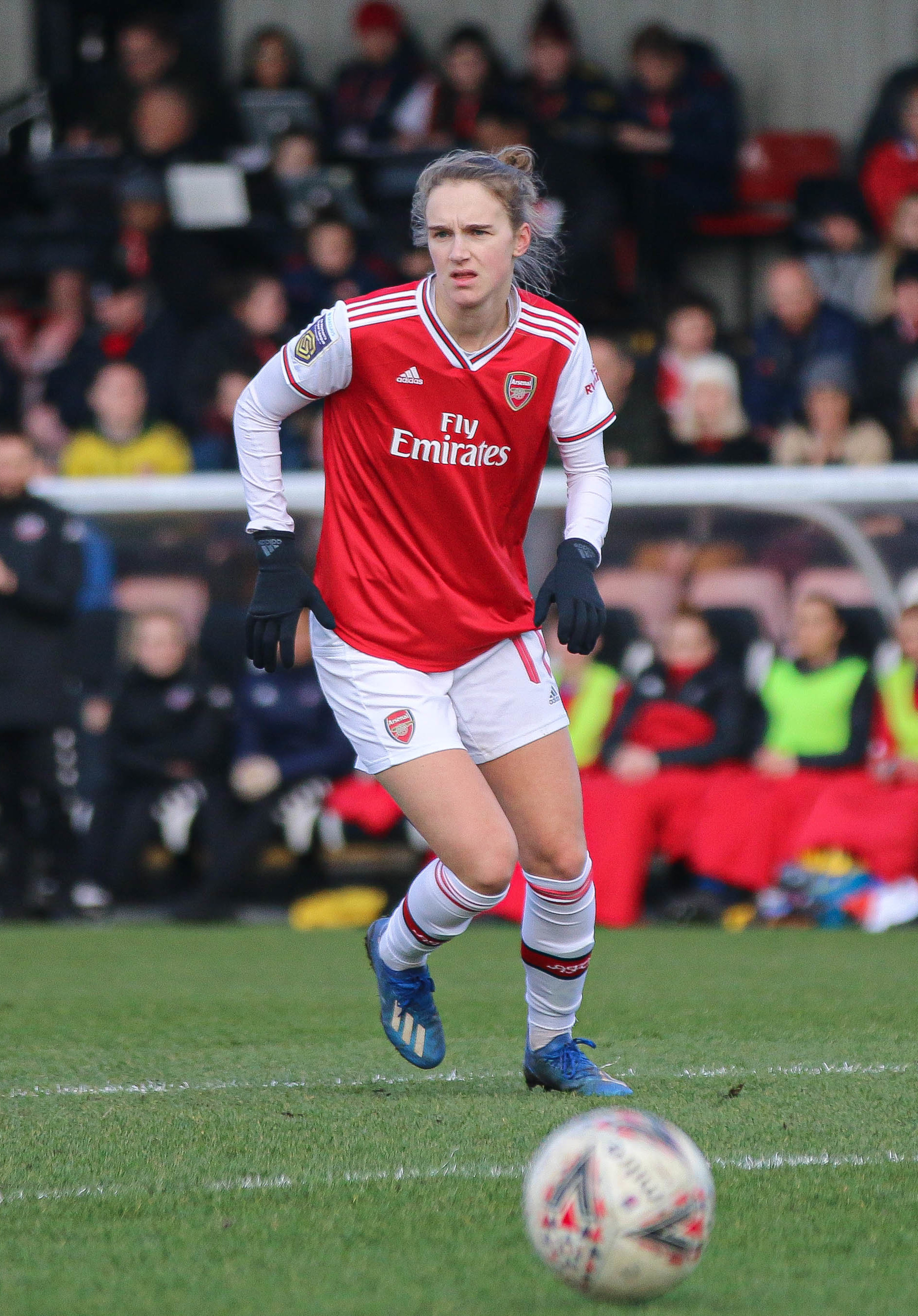
Vivianne Miedema scored 80 WSL goals in 106 appearances for Arsenal, winning two consecutive golden boots 2018–20.

- **Marit Auée** – **Brighton & Hove Albion** – 2024–
- **Jill Baijings** – **Aston Villa** – 2024–
- Dominique Bruinenberg – Sunderland, Everton – 2017–19
- Marije Brummel – Bristol Academy – 2015
- **Veerle Buurman** – **Chelsea** – 2025–
- **Kerstin Casparij** – **Manchester City** – 2022–
- Esmee de Graaf – West Ham United, Leicester City – 2018–20, 2021–22
- Damaris Egurrola – Everton – 2020–21
- **Chasity Grant** – **Aston Villa** – 2024–
- Jackie Groenen – Chelsea, Manchester United – 2014–15, 2019–22
- Nadine Hanssen – Aston Villa – 2020–21
- Anouk Hoogendijk – Bristol Academy, Arsenal – 2011, 2014
- **Dominique Janssen** – Arsenal, **Manchester United** – 2015–19, 2024–
- Inessa Kaagman – Everton, Brighton & Hove Albion – 2018–22
- **Wieke Kaptein** – **Chelsea** – 2024–
- **Isa Kardinaal** – **London City Lionesses** – 2025–
- Danique Kerkdijk – Bristol City, Brighton & Hove Albion – 2017–22
- **Lize Kop** – Leicester City, **Tottenham Hotspur** – 2023–
- Tessel Middag – Manchester City, West Ham United – 2016–20
- **Vivianne Miedema** (**117**) – Arsenal, **Manchester City** – 2017–
- Marthe Munsterman – Everton – 2017–18
- Nadine Noordam – Brighton & Hove Albion – 2024–
- Aniek Nouwen – Chelsea, Crystal Palace – 2021–25
- **Marisa Olislagers** – **Brighton & Hove Albion** – 2024–
- **Victoria Pelova** – Arsenal, **Tottenham Hotspur** – 2022–
- Lucienne Reichardt – West Ham United – 2018–19
- Jill Roord – Arsenal, Manchester City – 2019–21, 2023–25
- Katja Snoeijs – Everton – 2022–26
- **Daniëlle van de Donk** – Arsenal, **London City Lionesses** – 2016–21, 2025–
- Shanice van de Sanden – Liverpool – 2016–17, 2022–24
- Mandy van den Berg – Liverpool, Reading – 2016–18
- Vita van der Linden – Bristol City – 2019–20
- **Daphne van Domselaar** – Aston Villa, **Arsenal** – 2023–
- Kika van Es – Everton – 2019–20
- **Rosa van Gool** – **Everton** – 2025–
- Sari van Veenendaal – Arsenal – 2015–19
- Ashleigh Weerden – Crystal Palace – 2024–25
- **Lynn Wilms** – **Aston Villa** – 2025–
- Siri Worm – Everton, Tottenham Hotspur – 2017–21

=== Norway ===
- Guro Bergsvand – Brighton & Hove Albion – 2022– 25
- **Celin Bizet** – Tottenham Hotspur, **Manchester United** – 2022–
- Kristine Bjørdal Leine – Reading – 2019–21
- **Julie Blakstad** – Manchester City, **Tottenham Hotspur** – 2021–24, 2026–
- Vilde Bøe Risa – Manchester United – 2021–23
- Amalie Eikeland – Reading – 2019–23
- Cecilie Fiskerstrand – Brighton & Hove Albion – 2020–21
- **Signe Gaupset** – **Tottenham Hotspur** – 2026–
- Benedicte Håland – Bristol City – 2020–21, 2023–24
- **Tuva Hansen** – **West Ham United** – 2026–
- Andrine Hegerberg – Birmingham City – 2016–18
- Hilde Gunn Olsen – Sunderland – 2015–17
- **Emilie Joramo** - **Brighton and Hove Albion** - 2026-
- **Anna Jøsendal** – **Liverpool** – 2026–
- **Justine Kielland** - **Aston Villa** - 2026-
- Cecilie Kvamme – West Ham United – 2019–21
- Thea Kyvåg – West Ham United – 2022–23
- **Frida Maanum** – **Arsenal** – 2021–
- Aurora Mikalsen – Tottenham Hotspur – 2020–21
- Maren Mjelde – Chelsea, Everton – 2017–25
- Ingrid Moe Wold – Everton – 2020–21
- **Lisa Naalsund** – Manchester United, **Birmingham City**– 2022–
- Guro Reiten (**109**) – Chelsea – 2019–26
- **Sophie Román Haug** – **Liverpool** – 2023–
- Ingrid Ryland – Liverpool – 2015
- Line Smørsgård – Liverpool – 2015
- **Elise Stenevik** – **Everton** – 2022–
- **Cathinka Tandberg** – **Tottenham Hotspur** – 2025–
- **Ylinn Tennebø** – **West Ham United** – 2026–
- **Elisabeth Terland** – Brighton & Hove Albion, **Manchester United** – 2022–
- Maria Thorisdottir – Chelsea, Manchester United, Brighton & Hove Albion – 2017–25
- **Olaug Tvedten** - **Brighton & Hove Albion** – 2026–
- Lisa-Marie Karlseng Utland – Reading – 2019–20

=== Poland ===
- Nikola Karczewska – Tottenham Hotspur – 2022–23
- Wiktoria Kiszkis – West Ham United – 2019–21
- **Kinga Szemik** (**22**) – **West Ham United** – 2024–

=== Portugal ===
- Ana Borges (**35**) – Chelsea – 2014–16
- Amanda DaCosta – Liverpool – 2013–14
- Matilde Fidalgo – Manchester City – 2019–20
- Tatiana Pinto – Bristol Academy, Brighton & Hove Albion – 2015, 2023–24
- Diana Silva – Aston Villa – 2020–21

=== Republic of Ireland ===
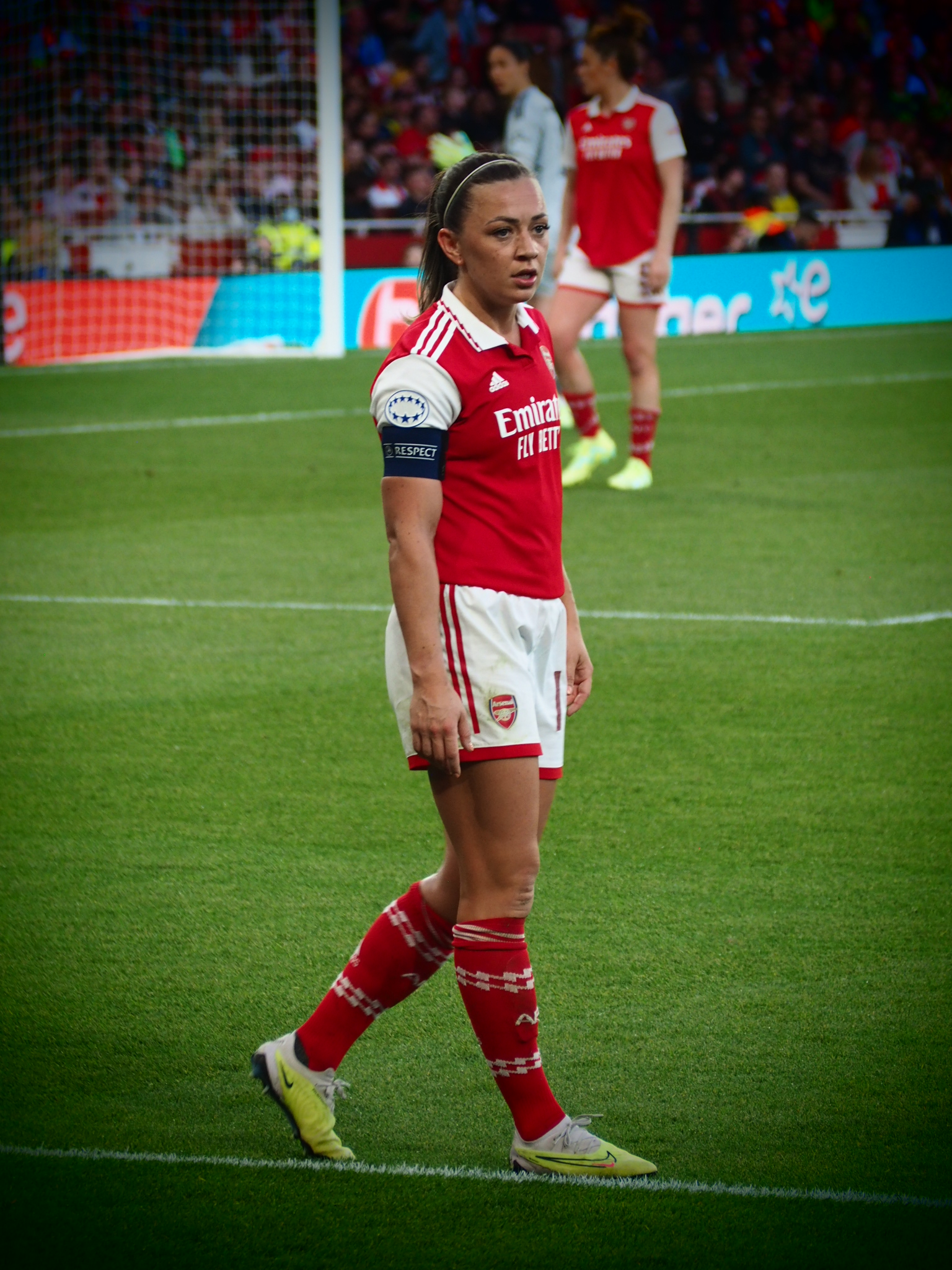
Katie McCabe won one WSL title with Arsenal and was named in the 2020–21 WSL Team of the Year.

- Lily Agg – Bristol City – 2017
- Isibeal Atkinson – West Ham United, Crystal Palace – 2022–25
- **Courtney Brosnan** – West Ham United, **Everton** – 2019–
- Emma Byrne – Arsenal – 2011–16
- Diane Caldwell – Manchester United, Reading – 2021–23
- Megan Campbell – Manchester City, Liverpool, Everton – 2016–20, 2022–24
- Megan Connolly – Brighton & Hove Albion, Bristol City – 2018–24
- Stef Curtis – Birmingham City – 2011
- Niamh Fahey – Arsenal, Chelsea, Liverpool – 2008–17, 2018–20, 2022–25
- Lillie Fenlon-Billson – Bristol Academy, Doncaster Rovers Belles, Liverpool, Lincoln – 2011–13
- Jamie Finn – Birmingham City – 2021–22
- Ciara Grant – Arsenal – 2011–13
- **Caitlin Hayes** – **Brighton & Hove Albion** – 2024–
- Marie Hourihan – Birmingham City, Chelsea, Manchester City, Brighton & Hove Albion – 2011–17, 2018–19, 2021–22
- Rianna Jarrett – Brighton & Hove Albion – 2020–21
- Katie Keane – Leicester City – 2026
- **Leanne Kiernan** – West Ham United, **Liverpool** – 2018–21, 2022–
- Harriet Lambe – Yeovil Town – 2017–18
- Abbie Larkin – Crystal Palace – 2024–25
- Ruesha Littlejohn – Liverpool, West Ham United, Birmingham City, Aston Villa – 2011–12, 2019–23
- **Lucia Lobato** - **Charlton Athletic** - 2026-
- Aoife Mannion – Birmingham City, Manchester City, Manchester United – 2013–25
- **Katie McCabe** (**160**) – Arsenal, **Chelsea** – 2016–
- Grace Moloney – Reading – 2016–23
- Emily Murphy – Chelsea, Birmingham City, **Brighton and Hove Albion** – 2019–21, 2026-
- Chloe Mustaki – Bristol City – 2023–24
- Hayley Nolan – Crystal Palace – 2024–25
- Áine O'Gorman – Doncaster Rovers Belles – 2011–12
- **Eve O'Carroll** – **Manchester City** – 2024–
- **Denise O'Sullivan** – Brighton & Hove Albion. **Liverpool** – 2020–21, 2026–
- Fiona O'Sullivan – Notts County – 2014–15
- **Anna Patten** – Arsenal, **Aston Villa** – 2017, 2020–
- Heather Payne – Bristol City, Everton, Leicester City – 2018–19, 2023–26
- Sophie Perry – Chelsea, Reading, Brighton & Hove Albion – 2011–12, 2016, 2018–19
- Louise Quinn – Arsenal, Birmingham City – 2017–20, 2021–22
- Lucy Quinn – Yeovil Town, Birmingham City, Tottenham Hotspur – 2017–22
- Lois Roche – Reading – 2016
- Stephanie Roche – Sunderland – 2015–17
- Julie-Ann Russell – Doncaster Rovers Belles – 2012
- Eleanor Ryan-Doyle – Birmingham City – 2021–22
- Harriet Scott – Reading, Birmingham City – 2016–22
- **Jessie Stapleton** – **West Ham United** – 2023–
- Tyler Toland – Manchester City – 2019–20
- Yvonne Tracy – Arsenal – 2011–13
- **Megan Walsh** – Everton, Notts County, Yeovil Town, Brighton & Hove Albion, **West Ham United** – 2013–14, 2016–
- Emily Whelan – Birmingham City – 2021–22
- **Sophie Whitehouse** **- Charlton Athletic** - 2026-
- **Jessica Ziu** – **West Ham United** – 2022–

=== Russia ===
- Alsu Abdullina (**11**) – Chelsea – 2021–23

=== Serbia ===
- **Jelena Čanković** (**38**) – Chelsea, **Brighton & Hove Albion** – 2022–
- Dejana Stefanović – Brighton & Hove Albion – 2022–25

=== Slovenia ===
- **Zara Kramžar** – **Everton** – 2026–
- **Sara Agrez** – **Liverpool** – 2026–

=== Spain ===
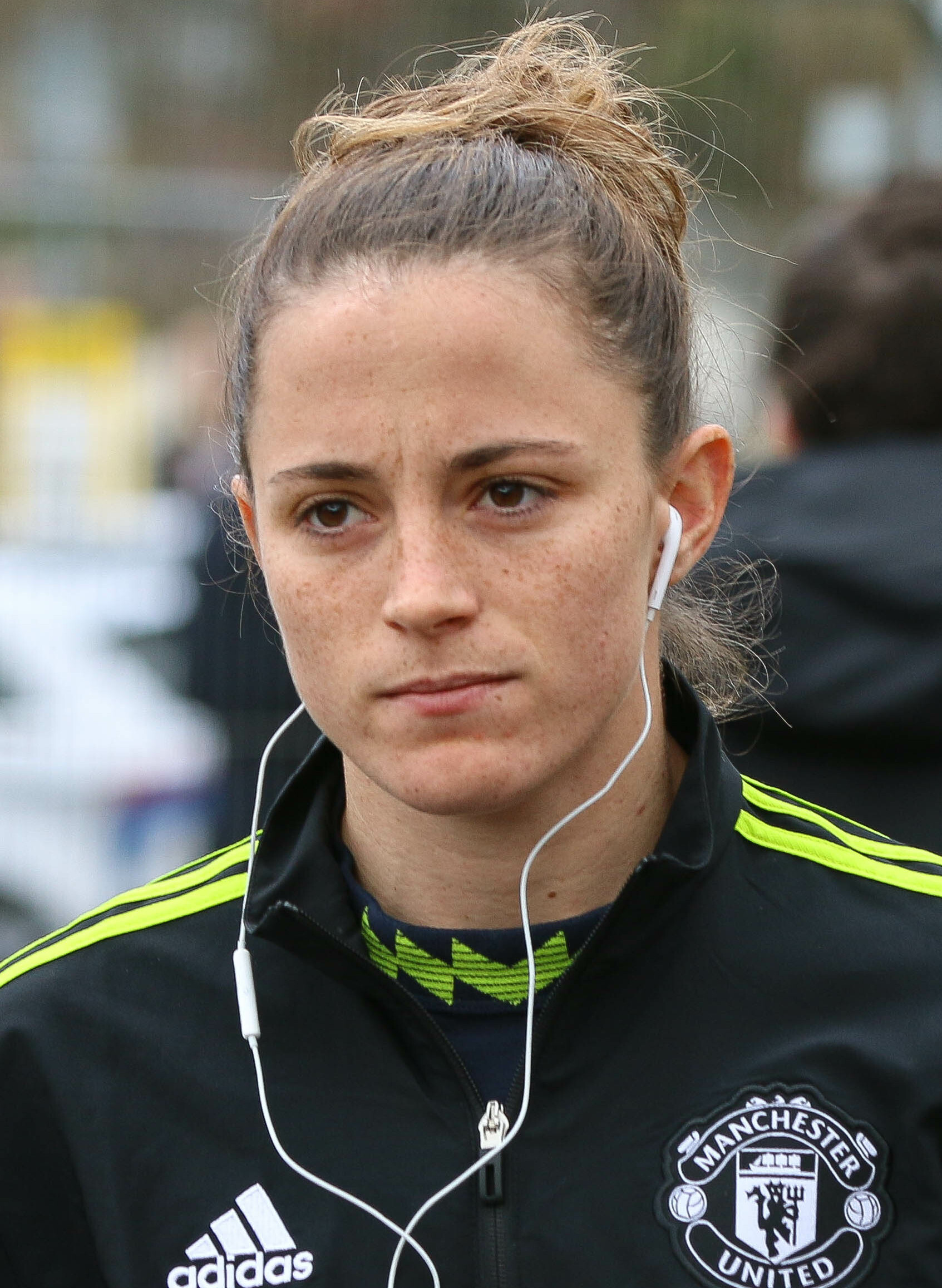
Ona Batlle was named to back to back WSL Team of the Year teams 2021–23.

- Laia Aleixandri – Manchester City – 2022–25
- **Júlia Bartel** – **Chelsea**, Liverpool – 2024–
- **Ona Batlle** – Manchester United, **Arsenal** – 2020–23, 2026-
- **Alejandra Bernabé** – Chelsea, **Liverpool** – 2023–
- **Mariona Caldentey** – **Arsenal** – 2024–
- **Carla Camacho** – **Brighton & Hove Albion** – 2025–
- **Laia Codina** – Arsenal, **West Ham United** – 2023–
- **Lucía Corrales** – **London City Lionesses** – 2025–
- Marta Corredera – Arsenal – 2015–16
- Laura del Río – Bristol Academy – 2012–14
- **Jana Fernández** – **London City Lionesses** – 2025–
- **Martina Fernández** – **Everton** – 2024–
- **Inma Gabarro** – **Everton** – 2024–
- Lucía García – Manchester United – 2022–24
- Irene Guerrero – Manchester United – 2023–24
- Keka – Bristol Academy – 2013–24
- **Elene Lete** – **London City Lionesses** – 2025–
- Vicky Losada (75) – Arsenal, Manchester City, Brighton & Hove Albion – 2015–16, 2021–25
- Adriana Martín – Chelsea – 2012
- **Maite Oroz** – **Tottenham Hotspur** – 2024–
- Leila Ouahabi – Manchester City – 2022–26
- Natalia Pablos – Bristol Academy, Arsenal – 2013–16
- **Paula Partido** - **Charlton Athletic** - 2026-
- **María Pérez** – **London City Lionesses** – 2025–
- **Misa Rodríguez** - **Arsenal** - 2026-
- Paula Tomás – Aston Villa – 2024–26
- Cristina Torkildsen – Birmingham City – 2012–14
- **Ornella Vignola** – **Everton** – 2025–
- Bruna Vilamala – Brighton & Hove Albion – 2024–25

=== Sweden ===
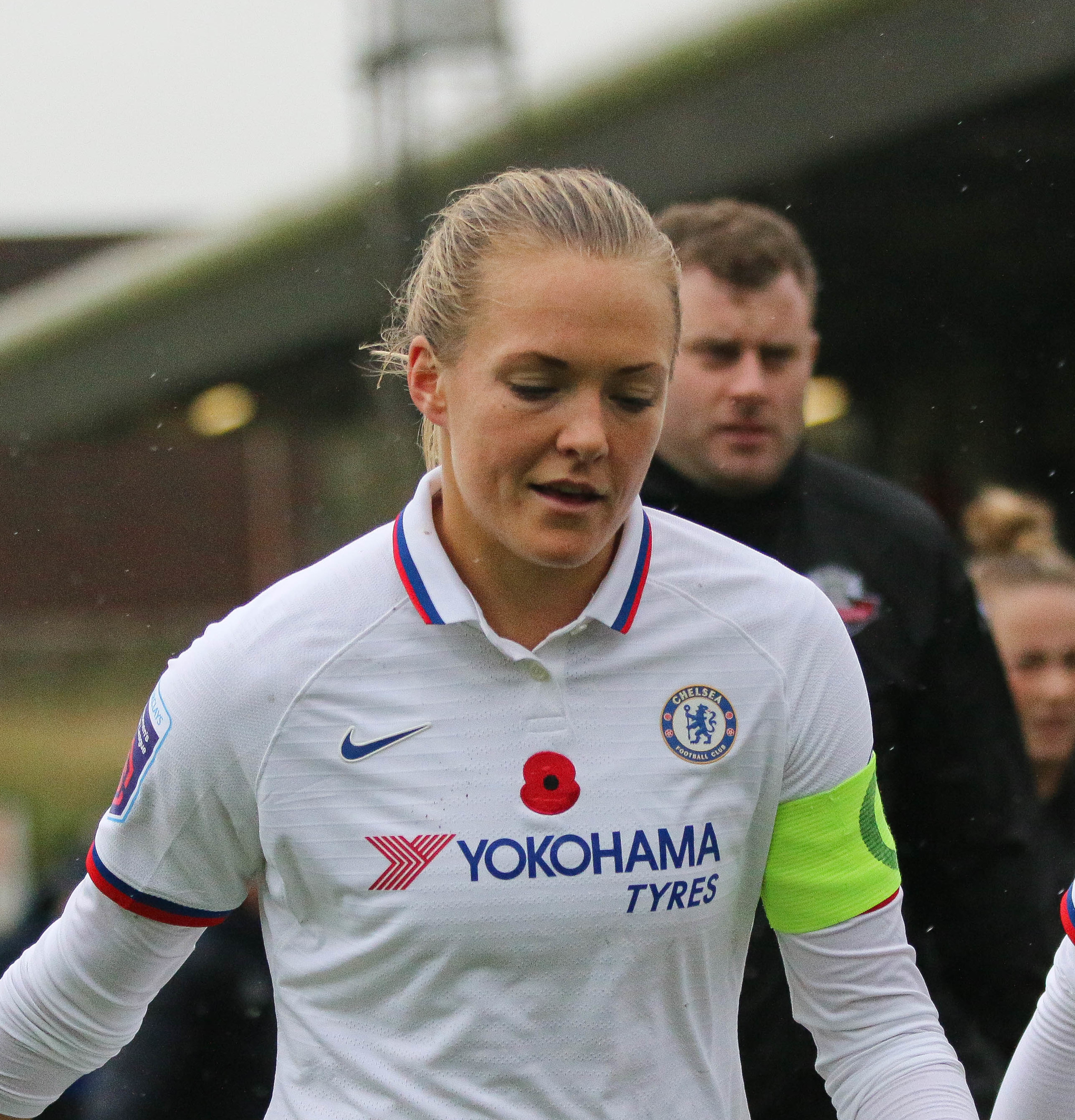
Magdalena Eriksson made 104 league appearances for Chelsea, winning the WSL title five times.

- Jonna Andersson – Chelsea – 2017–22
- Filippa Angeldal – Manchester City – 2021–24
- Anna Anvegård – Everton – 2021–22
- **Kosovare Asllani** – Manchester City, **London City Lionesses**– 2016–17, 2025–
- Marija Banušić – Chelsea – 2015
- Hanna Bennison – Everton – 2021–24
- Marika Bergman-Lundin – West Ham United – 2024–25
- **Alice Bergström** – **Liverpool** – 2026–
- **Nathalie Björn** – Everton, **Chelsea** – 2021–
- **Stina Blackstenius** – **Arsenal** – 2021–
- My Cato – Crystal Palace – 2024–25
- Magdalena Eriksson (**104**) – Chelsea – 2017–23
- **Jennifer Falk** – **Liverpool (loan)** – 2026–
- **Smilla Holmberg** – **Arsenal** – 2026–
- Lina Hurtig – Arsenal – 2022–25
- Amanda Ilestedt – Arsenal – 2023–25
- Sofia Jakobsson – Chelsea, London City Lionesses – 2013, 2025–26
- Emma Jansson – Leicester City – 2026
- **Rosa Kafaji** – Arsenal, Brighton & Hove Albion, **London City Lionesses** – 2024–
- **Wilma Leidhammar** - **Birmingham City** - 2026-
- **Johanna Rytting Kaneryd** – **Chelsea** – 2022–
- **Cornelia Kapocs** – **Liverpool** – 2024–
- Maria Karlsson – Doncaster Rovers Belles – 2011
- Maja Krantz – Notts County – 2016
- Emma Kullberg – Brighton & Hove Albion – 2021–24
- Hedvig Lindahl – Chelsea – 2015–19
- Emma Lundh – Liverpool – 2016
- **Hanna Lundkvist** – **Manchester United** – 2026–
- Zećira Mušović – Chelsea – 2020–24
- **Amanda Nildén** – Brighton & Hove Albion, **Tottenham Hotspur** – 2018–20, 2023–
- **Matilda Nildén** – **Tottenham Hotspur** – 2026–
- Lotta Ökvist – Manchester United – 2019–21
- **Beata Olsson** – **Liverpool** – 2025–
- Emilia Pelgander – Leicester City – 2023–25
- **Julia Roddar** – **London City Lionesses** – 2025–
- **Fridolina Rolfö** – **Manchester United** – 2025–
- Josefine Rybrink – Tottenham Hotspur – 2024–26
- **Anna Sandberg** – **Manchester United** – 2024–
- Louise Schillgard (née Fors) – Liverpool – 2013
- Julia Spetsmark – Manchester City – 2017–18
- **Matilda Vinberg** – **Tottenham Hotspur** – 2023–
- Filippa Wallén – West Ham United – 2019–20
- **Ellen Wangerheim** – **Manchester United** – 2026–
- **Hanna Wijk** – **Tottenham Hotspur** – 2026–
- Jessica Wik (née Samuelsson) – Arsenal – 2017–19
- Emma Wilhelmsson – Chelsea – 2014
- **Julia Zigiotti Olme** – Brighton & Hove Albion, **Manchester United** – 2021–24, 2025–

=== Switzerland ===
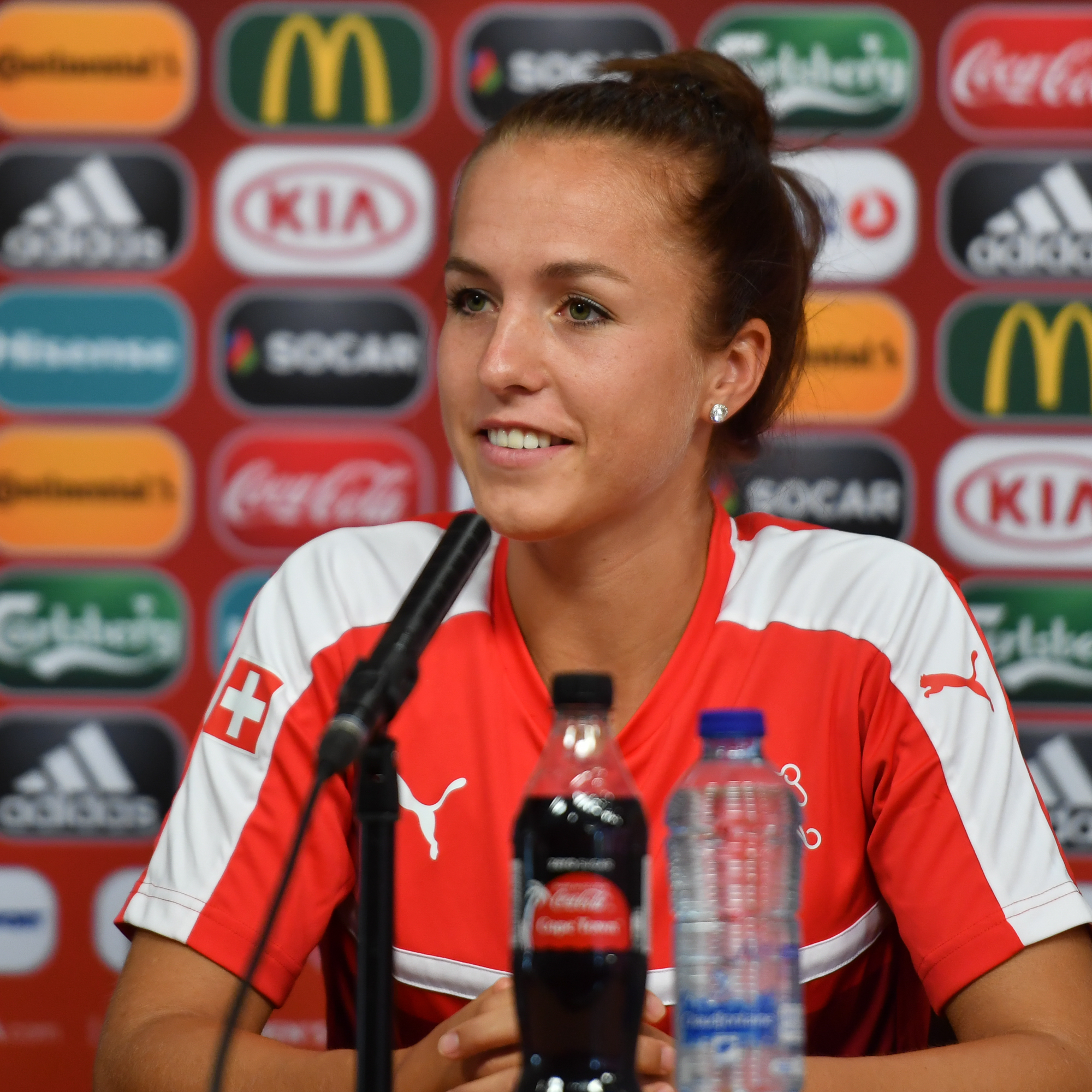
Lia Wälti is Switzerland's leading WSL appearance maker.

- Ramona Bachmann – Chelsea – 2017–20
- **Iman Beney** – **Manchester City** – 2025–
- **Luana Bühler** – **Tottenham Hotspur** – 2023–
- **Aurélie Csillag** – **Liverpool** – 2026–
- Malin Gut – Arsenal – 2020–21
- Alisha Lehmann – West Ham United, Everton, Aston Villa, Leicester City – 2018–24, 2025–26
- **Noelle Maritz** – Arsenal, **Aston Villa** – 2020–
- **Livia Peng** – **Chelsea** – 2025–
- **Seraina Piubel** – **West Ham United** – 2024–
- **Lia Wälti** (**113**) – Arsenal, **Brighton and Hove Albion** – 2018–25, 2026-
- **Leila Wandeler** – **West Ham United** – 2025–

=== Turkey ===
- **Halle Houssein** (**11**) – Arsenal, **West Ham United** – 2021–

== North, Central America and Caribbean (CONCACAF) ==
=== Canada ===
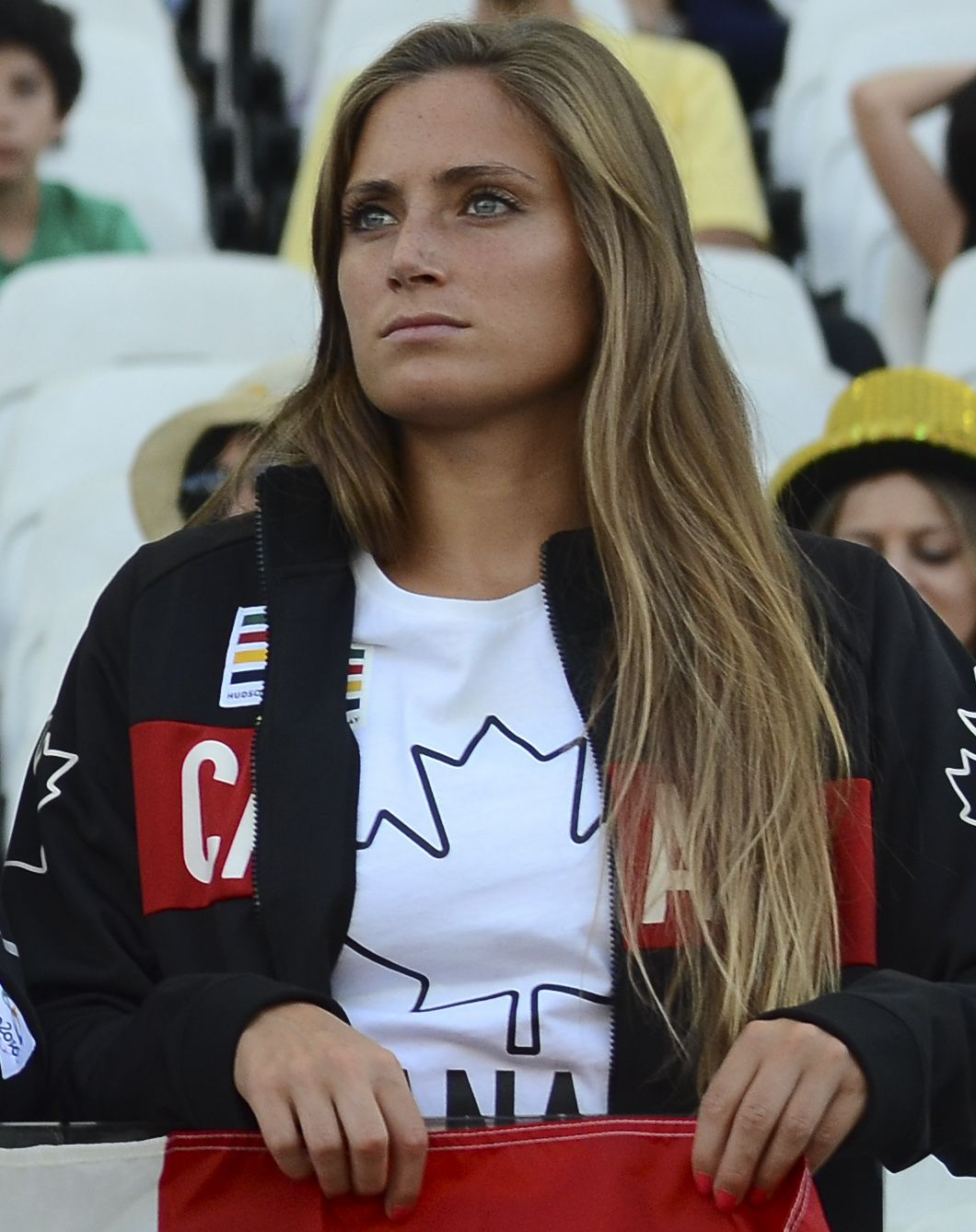
Shelina Zadorsky is Canada's leading WSL appearance maker.

- **Simi Awujo** – **Manchester United** – 2024–
- Janine Beckie – Manchester City – 2018–22
- **Kadeisha Buchanan** – **Chelsea** – 2022–
- Sabrina D'Angelo – Arsenal, Aston Villa – 2022–26
- Jessie Fleming – Chelsea – 2020–24
- Maddie Hill – Sunderland – 2015–17
- Cloé Lacasse – Arsenal – 2023–24
- Alyssa Lagonia – Doncaster Rovers Belles – 2012
- Clarissa Larisey – Crystal Palace – 2024–25
- **Marie Levasseur** – **Birmingham City** – 2026–
- Ashley Lawrence – Chelsea – 2023–25
- Adriana Leon – West Ham United, Manchester United, Aston Villa – 2018–25
- **Jayde Riviere** – **Manchester United** – 2022–
- Deanne Rose – Reading, Leicester City – 2021–25
- **Jade Rose** – **Manchester City** – 2025–
- Desiree Scott – Notts County – 2014–15
- Kylla Sjoman – Doncaster Rovers Belles, Sunderland – 2011, 2016–18
- **Olivia Smith** – Liverpool, **Arsenal** – 2024–
- Sarah Stratigakis – Bristol City – 2023–24
- Shelina Zadorsky (86) – Tottenham Hotspur, West Ham United – 2020–26

=== Dominican Republic ===
- Lucia Leon (**12**) – Tottenham Hotspur – 2019–21

=== Haiti ===
- **Batcheba Louis** - Birmingham City - 2026

=== Jamaica ===
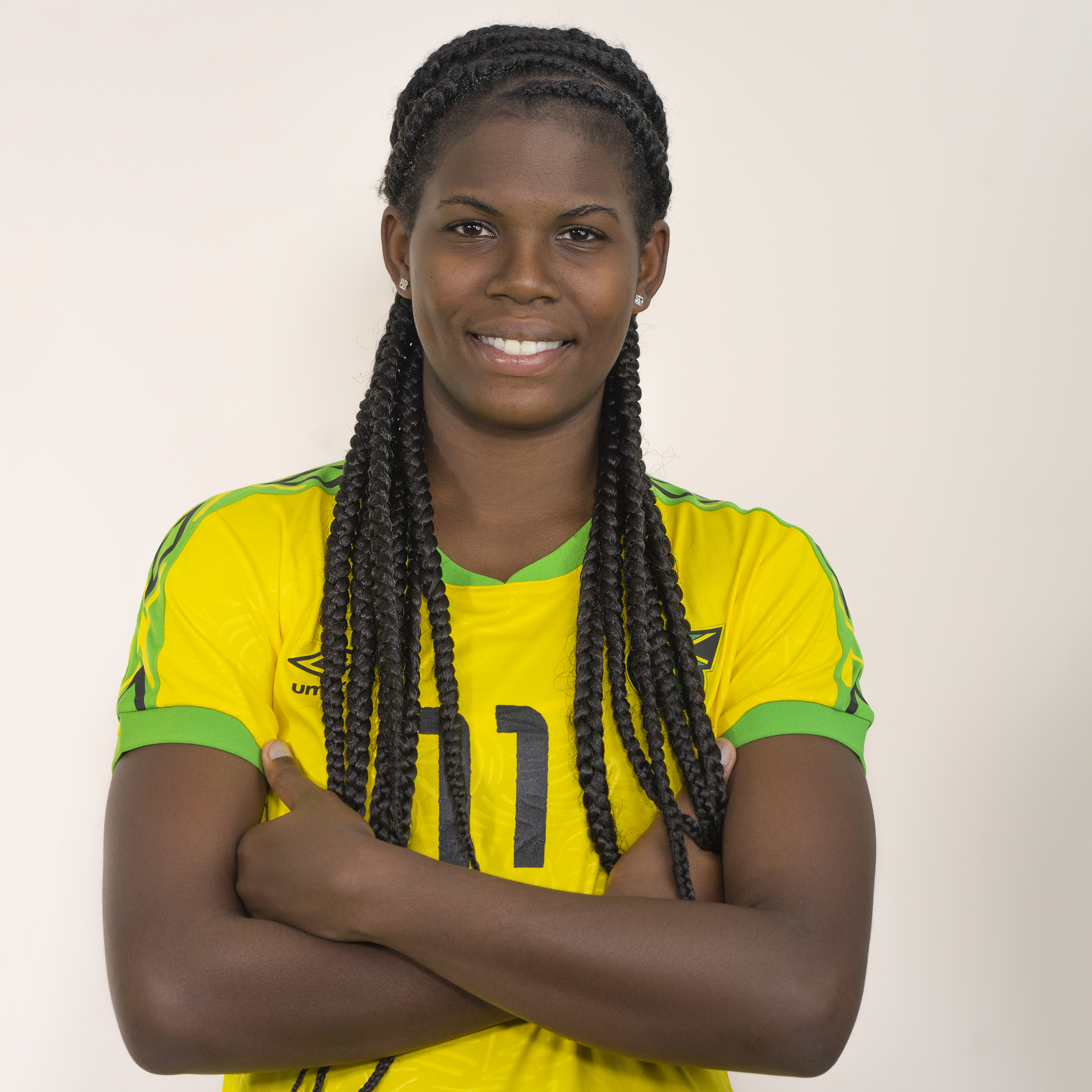
Khadija Shaw won the WSL golden boot during the 2023–24 season, scoring 21 goals in 18 games.

- Jade Bailey – Arsenal, Chelsea, Reading, Liverpool – 2013–16, 2018–20
- Paige Bailey-Gayle – Arsenal, Leicester City – 2018–19, 2021–22
- Shania Hayles – Birmingham City, Aston Villa, Bristol City – 2018–22, 2023–24
- Satara Murray – Liverpool, Bristol City – 2015–19, 2023–24
- Lachante Paul – Leicester City – 2021–22
- Atlanta Primus – Chelsea – 2014
- Vyan Sampson – Arsenal, West Ham United – 2014–15, 2018–19
- **Khadija Shaw** – **Manchester City** – 2021–
- **Drew Spence** (**189**) – Chelsea, **Tottenham Hotspur** – 2011–
- **Rebecca Spencer** – Birmingham City, **Chelsea**, West Ham United, Tottenham Hotspur – 2012–
- Allyson Swaby – Crystal Palace – 2024–25
- Chantelle Swaby – Leicester City – 2024–26
- Victoria Williams – Doncaster Rovers Belles, Chelsea, Sunderland, Brighton & Hove Albion – 2011–13, 2015–23

=== Mexico ===
- Rebeca Bernal - Man Utd - 2026

=== Puerto Rico ===
- Caitlin Cosme - Crystal Palace - 2026

=== Saint Lucia ===
- Eartha Pond **(4)** – Birmingham City, Everton – 2011–12

=== United States ===
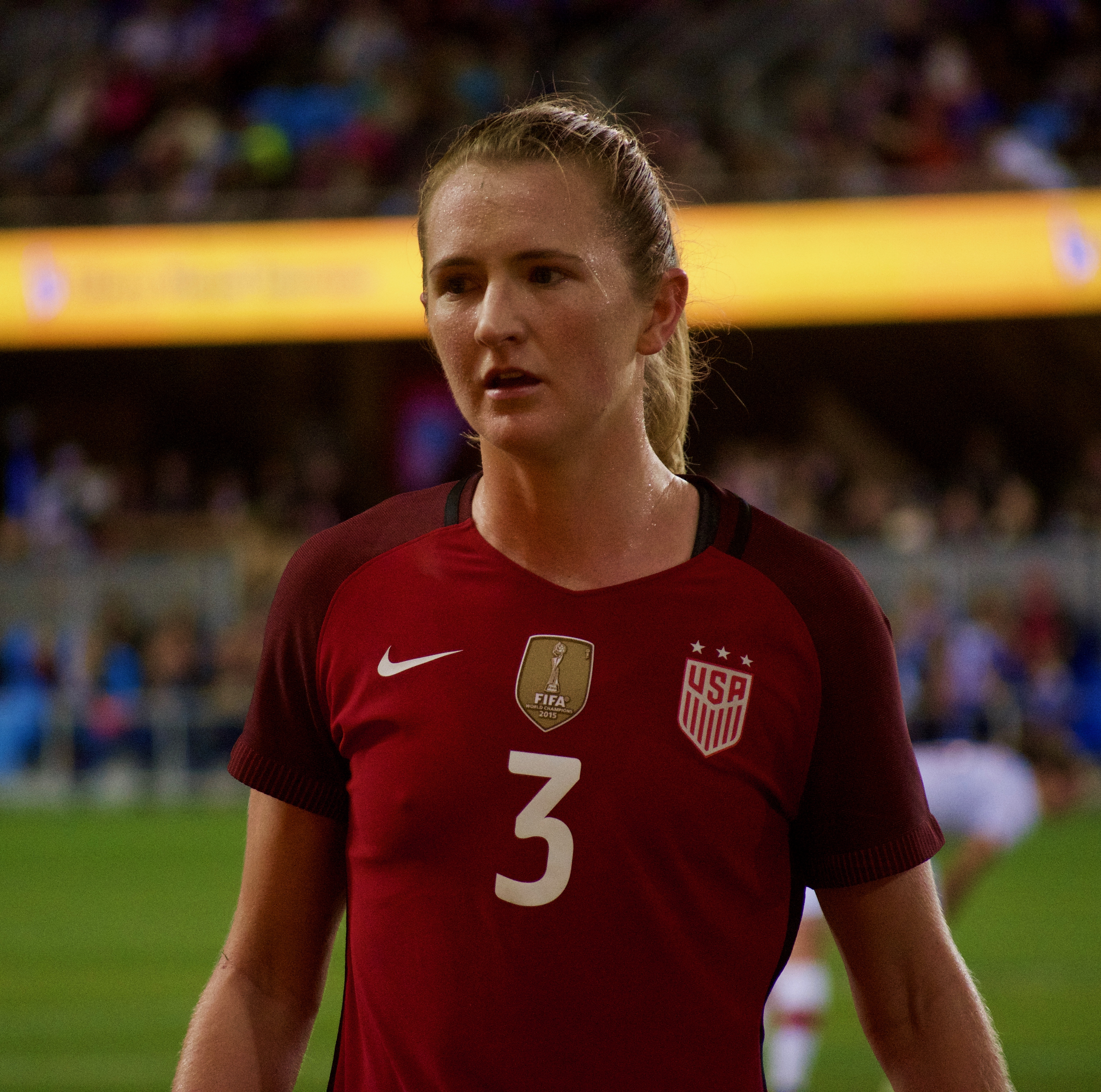
Sam Mewis was named to the 2020–21 WSL Team of the Year during her only season in the WSL.

- Celeste Boureille – **Leicester City** – 2025–26
- **Sam Coffey** – **Manchester City** – 2026–
- Abby Dahlkemper – Manchester City – 2020–21
- Crystal Dunn – Chelsea – 2017–18
- Whitney Engen – Liverpool – 2013
- Mia Fishel – Chelsea – 2023–25
- **Emily Fox** – **Arsenal** – 2023–
- Lucy Gillett – Brighton & Hove Albion – 2018–19
- **Naomi Girma** – **Chelsea** – 2024–
- **Madison Haley** – **Brighton & Hove Albion** – 2023–
- Tobin Heath – Manchester United, Arsenal – 2020–22
- Brooke Hendrix – West Ham United, Reading – 2018–20, 2022–23
- Adrienne Jordan – Birmingham City – 2019–20
- **Gillian Kenney** - **Charlton Athletic** - 2026-
- Rose Lavelle – Manchester City – 2020–21
- Beverly Leon – Sunderland – 2016–17
- Carli Lloyd – Manchester City – 2017
- Catarina Macario – Chelsea – 2023–26
- Kaylan Marckese – Bristol City – 2023–24
- Kristie Mewis – West Ham United – 2023–25
- Sam Mewis – Manchester City – 2020–21
- Alex Morgan – Tottenham Hotspur – 2020–21
- Zoe Morse – Brighton & Hove Albion – 2022–23
- Jenna Nighswonger – Arsenal, Aston Villa – 2024–2026
- Heather O'Reilly – Arsenal – 2017–18
- Christen Press – Manchester United – 2020–21
- Erin Simon – West Ham United, Leicester City – 2018–20, 2022–23
- Katie Stengel (**41**) – Liverpool, Crystal Palace – 2022–23, 2024–25
- Libby Stout – Liverpool – 2014–15
- Katelin Talbert – Aston Villa – 2024–25
- **Alyssa Thompson** – **Chelsea** – 2025–
- **Phallon Tullis-Joyce** – **Manchester United** – 2024–
- Brianna Visalli – West Ham United, Birmingham City, Brighton & Hove Albion – 2018–20, 2022–23
- Zaneta Wyne – Sunderland, West Ham United – 2017–18, 2021–22
- Shae Yáñez – Bristol City, Crystal Palace – 2023–25

== Oceania (OFC) ==
=== New Zealand ===
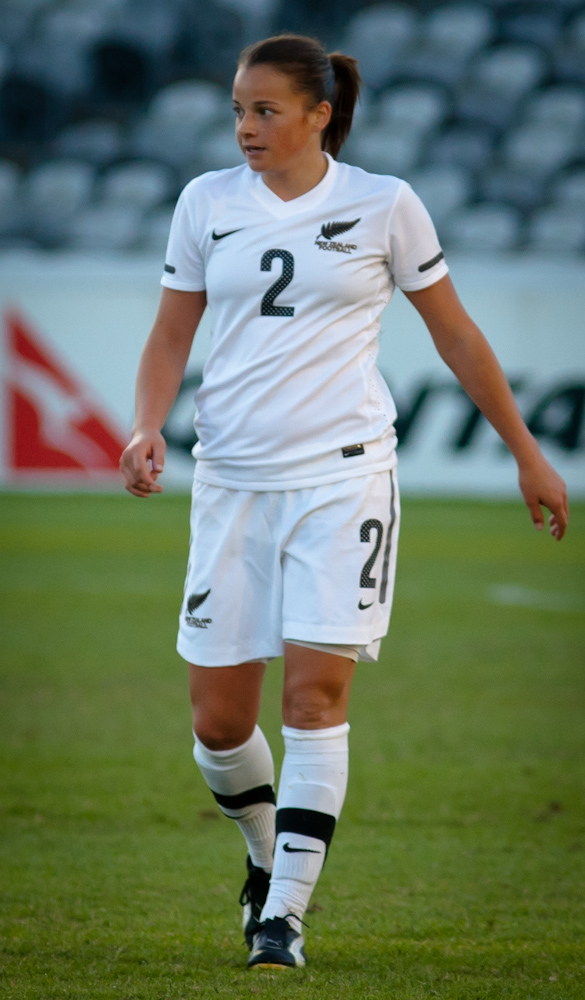
New Zealand international Ria Percival has made 73 WSL appearances, the most of any OFC player.

- CJ Bott – Leicester City – 2021–25
- Hayley Bowden (née Moorwood) – Chelsea, Lincoln – 2011, 2013
- Olivia Chance – Everton, Bristol City – 2017–20
- Aroon Clansey – Liverpool – 2012
- Katie Duncan (née Hoyle) – Notts County – 2014
- Anna Green – Notts County, Reading – 2014, 2017–18
- Sarah Gregorius – Liverpool – 2013
- Betsy Hassett – Manchester City – 2014
- Emma Kete – Lincoln, Manchester City – 2011, 2014
- Anna Leat – West Ham United, Aston Villa – 2021–24
- Ria Percival (**73**) – West Ham United, Tottenham Hotspur – 2018–24
- Ali Riley – Chelsea – 2018–19
- Indiah-Paige Riley – Crystal Palace – 2024–25
- Katie Rood – Lincoln, Bristol City – 2012, 2018–19
- Rebekah Stott – Brighton & Hove Albion – 2020–21, 2022–23
- Rosie White – Liverpool – 2015–16

=== Samoa ===
- Monique Fischer (**4**) – Yeovil Town – 2018–19

== South America (CONMEBOL) ==
=== Brazil ===
- Ester – Chelsea – 2013
- Ivana Fuso – Manchester United – 2020–22
- Geyse (**28**) – Manchester United – 2023–26
- Kerolin – Manchester City – 2024–26
- Gabi Nunes – Aston Villa – 2024–26
- Giovana Queiroz – Everton, Arsenal – 2022–23
- Rafaelle Souza – Arsenal – 2021–23

=== Chile ===
- Christiane Endler – Chelsea – 2014
- **Camila Sáez** (**8**) – **West Ham United** – 2024–

=== Colombia ===
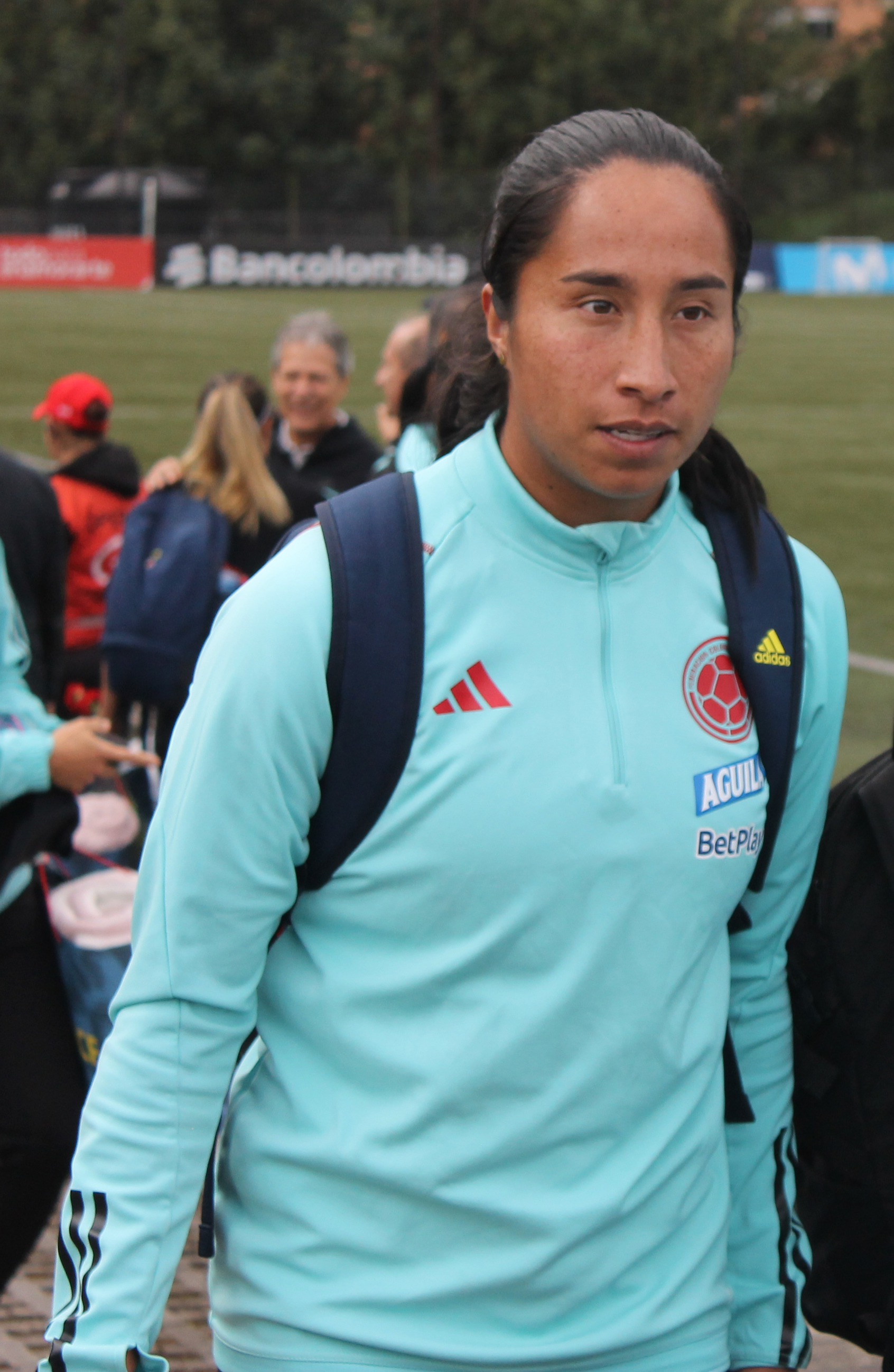
Mayra Ramírez joined Chelsea for a world-record fee in 2024.

- Jorelyn Carabalí (**26**) – Brighton & Hove Albion – 2023–26
- Manuela Paví – West Ham United – 2024–26
- **Mayra Ramírez** – **Chelsea** – 2023–
- Karla Torres – Leicester City – 2024–25
- **Manuela Vanegas** – **Brighton & Hove Albion** – 2025–

=== Venezuela ===
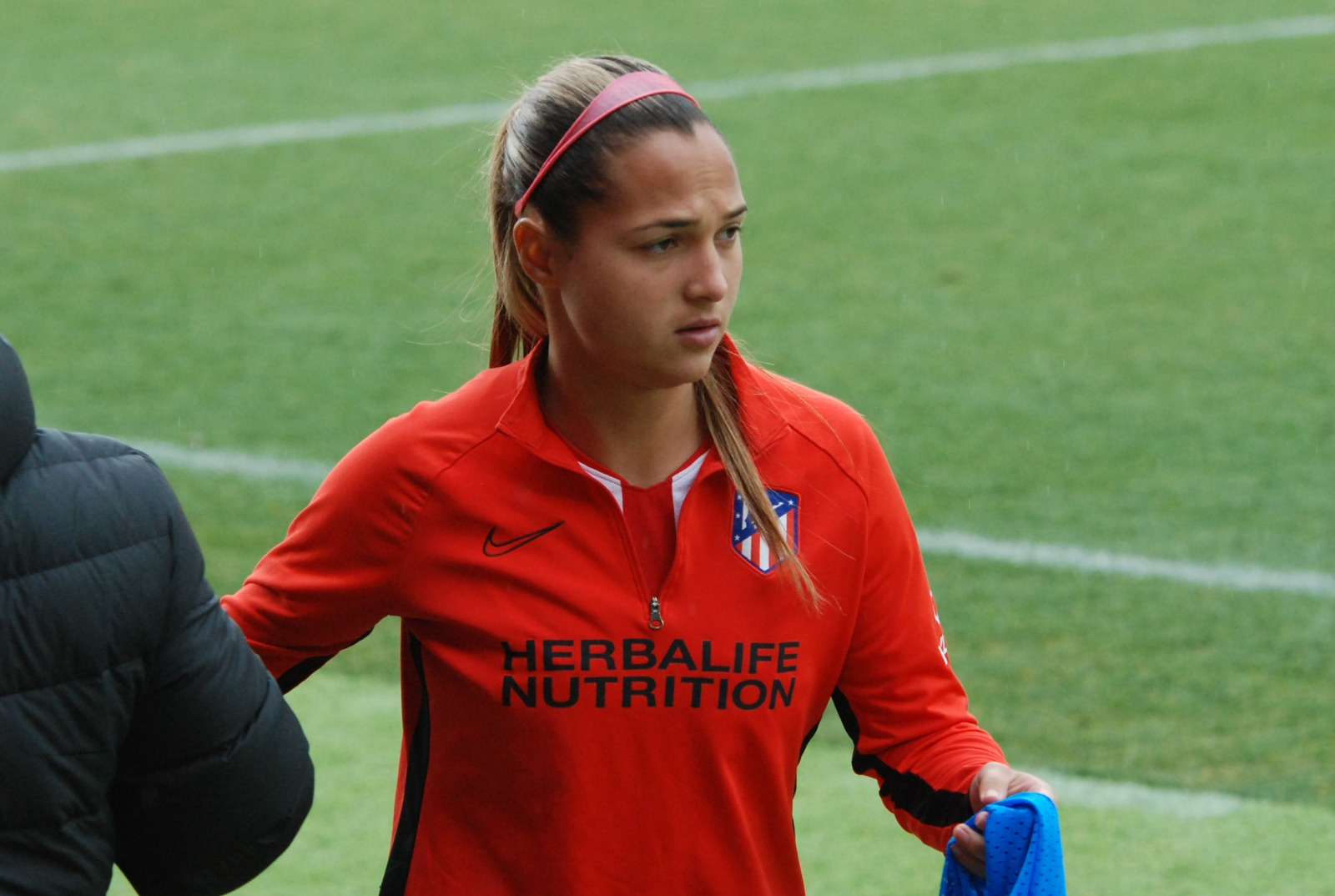
Deyna Castellanos

- Deyna Castellanos (**24**) – Manchester City – 2022–24

== Summary ==
=== By nationality ===
Rank	Nation(s)	Players
1	Republic of Ireland	46
2	Sweden	45
3	Netherlands	39
4	Australia	36
5	United States	35
6	Norway	31
7	Germany	29
8	Spain	27
9	Denmark, Japan	26
11	France	25
12	Canada	19
13	New Zealand	16
14	Finland	14
15	Jamaica	13
16	Switzerland	11
17	Belgium	9
18	Brazil, Nigeria	7
20	Austria, Iceland	6
22	Portugal, South Korea, Colombia	5
25	China	4
26	Poland, Italy	3
28	Chile, (Czech Republic) Czechia, Ghana, Morocco, Serbia	2
33	Algeria, Bulgaria, Cameroon, Dominican Republic, Equatorial Guinea, Greece, Hungary, Kosovo, Malta, Russia, Saint Lucia, Samoa, Syria, Tanzania, Turkey, Venezuela, Slovenia, Ivory Coast	1

=== By continent ===
Continent refers to the corresponding continental confederation of the player's nationality.

Rank	Confederation	Players	Nations
1	Europe (UEFA)	318	25
2	Asia (AFC)	69	5
3	North America and Caribbean (CONCACAF)	66	5
4	Oceania (OFC)	17	2
5	South America (CONMEBOL)	14	4
6	Africa (CAF)	12	6

== Notes ==
1. Born in Afghanistan
2. Born in Uruguay
3. Born in Brazil
4. Born in Canada
5. Born in China
6. Born in England
7. Born in France
8. Born in Germany
9. Born in New Zealand
10. Born in Scotland
11. Born in Sweden
12. Born in Spain
13. Born in United States
14. Capped for Albania
15. Capped for Algeria
16. Capped for the Australia U20s
17. Capped for Australia
18. Capped for the Canada U17s
19. Capped for the England U18s
20. Capped for the England U19s
21. Capped for the England U20s
22. Capped for the England U21s
23. Capped for the England U23s
24. Capped for England
25. Capped for the France U19s
26. Capped for the Germany U19s
27. Capped for the Scotland U19s
28. Capped for the Spain U17s
29. Capped for the Spain U19s
30. Capped for Spain
31. Capped for the United States U17s
32. Capped for the United States U20s
33. Capped for the United States U23s
34. Currently loaned outside of the WSL
