= 2019–20 West Ham United F.C. Women season =

West Ham United
2019–20 season
- Chairman: Jack Sullivan
- Head Coach: Matt Beard
- Stadium: Rush Green Stadium, Romford
- FA WSL: 8th
- FA Cup: Fourth round
- League Cup: Group stage
- Top goalscorer: League: Adriana Leon (5); All: Kenza Dali (7)
- Highest home attendance: 24,790 (vs. Tottenham Hotspur, 29 September)
- Lowest home attendance: League: 1,297 (vs. Birmingham City, 15 September); All: 336 (vs. Crystal Palace, 11 December, League Cup)
- Average home league attendance: 5,002 as of 23 February 2020
Home colours	Away colours	Third colours

The 2019–20 West Ham United F.C. Women season was the club's 29th season in existence and their second in the FA Women's Super League, the highest level of the football pyramid. Along with competing in the WSL, the club also contested two domestic cup competitions: the FA Cup and the League Cup.

On 13 March 2020, in line with the FA's response to the coronavirus pandemic, it was announced the season was temporarily suspended until at least 3 April 2020. After further postponements, the season was ultimately ended prematurely on 25 May 2020 with immediate effect. West Ham sat in 8th at the time, and retained their position on sporting merit after The FA Board's decision to award places on a points-per-game basis.

== Squad ==
As of 24 January 2020.

Note: Flags indicate national team as defined under FIFA eligibility rules; some limited exceptions apply. Players may hold more than one non-FIFA nationality.

No.	Pos.	Nation	Player
1	GK	ENG	Anna Moorhouse
2	DF	NOR	Cecilie Kvamme
5	DF	ENG	Gilly Flaherty (captain)
7	FW	SUI	Alisha Lehmann
8	FW	IRL	Leanne Kiernan
9	FW	SCO	Martha Thomas
10	MF	GER	Julia Simic
11	DF	GER	Katharina Baunach
12	MF	ENG	Kate Longhurst
13	DF	SWE	Filippa Wallén
15	FW	AUS	Jacynta Galabadaarachchi

No.	Pos.	Nation	Player
16	FW	IRL	Ruesha Littlejohn
17	FW	NED	Esmee de Graaf
18	GK	IRL	Courtney Brosnan
19	FW	CAN	Adriana Leon
20	MF	KOR	Cho So-hyun
21	MF	FRA	Kenza Dali
22	DF	ENG	Grace Fisk
23	MF	NED	Tessel Middag
24	MF	POL	Wiktoria Kiszkis
25	DF	ENG	Olivia Smith (Note: Signed on non-contract terms)
26	DF	GER	Laura Vetterlein

== Pre-season ==
West Ham arranged five friendly matches in preparation for the 2019–20 season, including two open to the public against Bristol City and Tottenham Hotspur.

4 August 2019 Friendly	West Ham United	–	Aston Villa	Behind closed doors
15:00
Note: No official scoreline released

11 August 2019 Friendly	West Ham United	–	Nottingham Forest	Behind closed doors
15:00
Note: No official scoreline released

18 August 2019 Friendly	Arsenal	–	West Ham United	Behind closed doors
14:00
Note: No official scoreline released

25 August 2019 Friendly	West Ham United	Cancelled	Bristol City	Romford
15:00				Stadium: Rush Green Stadium

1 September 2019 Friendly	West Ham United	1–2	Tottenham Hotspur	Romford
15:00	Thomas 23'		Addison 81'; Leon 88'	Stadium: Rush Green Stadium

== FA Women's Super League ==
=== Results summary ===
Overall								Home						Away					
Pld	W	D	L	GF	GA	GD	Pts	W	D	L	GF	GA	GD	W	D	L	GF	GA	GD
14	5	1	8	19	34	−15	16	4	0	3	13	13	0	1	1	5	6	21	−15

Last updated: 23 February 2020.
Source: FA WSL

=== Results by matchday ===
Round	1	2	3	4	5	6	7	8	9	10	11	12	13	14	15	16	17	18	19	20	21	22
Ground	A	H	H	A	H	A	H	H	A	A	H	A	A	H	A	H	H	A	H	A	A	H
Result	L	W	L	W	L	L	L	W	D	L	W	L	L	W	C	C	C	C	C	C	C	C
Position	8	5	8	6	7	8	8	8	8	8	8	8	8	8								

A = Away; H = Home; W = Win; D = Draw; L = Loss

=== Results ===
8 September 2019 1	Arsenal	2–1	West Ham United	Borehamwood
15:00	Schnaderbeck (yellow card) 1'; Mead 14'; Maier (yellow card) 25'; Roord 41' (yellow card) 90+3'	Report	Leon (yellow card) 44'; Thomas 58'	Stadium: Meadow Park; Referee: Stacey Pearson

15 September 2019 2	West Ham United	1–0	Birmingham City	Romford
15:00	Longhurst (yellow card) 18'; Leon 27'	Report	Harrop (yellow card) 19'; Holloway (yellow card) 24'	Stadium: Rush Green Stadium; Attendance: 1,297; Referee: Paul Howard

29 September 2019 3	West Ham United	0–2	Tottenham Hotspur	Stratford
14:30	Kvamme (yellow card) 83'; Dali (yellow card) 84'	Report	Dean 36'; Ayane (yellow card) 64'; Quinn 84'	Stadium: London Stadium; Attendance: 24,790; Referee: Abigail Byrne

13 October 2019 4	Brighton & Hove Albion	1–3	West Ham United	Crawley
14:00	Le Garrec (yellow card) 63'; Skovsen (yellow card) 66'; Green (yellow card) 90'; Connolly 90+2'	Report	Vetterlein (yellow card) 20'; Thomas 24'; Dali 70' (pen.); Lehmann 73', (yellow card) 90+1'	Stadium: Broadfield Stadium; Attendance: 849; Referee: Lisa Benn

27 October 2019 5	West Ham United	1–3	Chelsea	Romford
15:00	Leon 60'	Report	Ingle 72'; Ji 74'; Spence (yellow card) 90+3', (goal) 90+5'	Stadium: Rush Green Stadium; Attendance: 2,122; Referee: Robert Whitton

17 November 2019 6	Manchester City	5–0	West Ham United	Manchester
14:00	White 11'; Stanway 31', 37', (yellow card) 63' (yellow-red card) 72'; Hemp 39'; Wullaert 53'	Report	Dali (yellow card) 27'	Stadium: Academy Stadium; Attendance: 2,145; Referee: Stacey Pearson

24 November 2019 7	West Ham United	2–3	Reading	Romford
15:00	Baunach 4'; Kvamme (yellow card) 15'; Kiernan 65'; Middag (yellow card) 70'	Report	Rowe (red card) 45+3'; Leine 75'; Chaplen 76'; Moore 82'; James (yellow card) 87'; Moloney (yellow card) 90+2'	Stadium: Rush Green Stadium; Attendance: 1,392; Referee: Lloyd Wood

1 December 2019 8	West Ham United	3–2	Manchester United	Romford
15:00	Vetterlein 3'; Longhurst (yellow card) 12'; Kiernan (yellow card) 14' (yellow-red card) 89'; Hendrix (yellow card) 52'; Thomas (yellow card) 64'; Baunach 83', 90'	Report	Hanson 1'; James 80', (yellow card) 86'; Toone (yellow card) 88'; Zelem (yellow card) 89'	Stadium: Rush Green Stadium; Attendance: 1,736; Referee: Amy Fearn

8 December 2019 9	Liverpool	1–1	West Ham United	Birkenhead
14:00	Charles 77'; Babajide (yellow card) 75'	Report	Leon 5'; Longhurst (yellow card) 66'; Kvamme (yellow card) 75'; Middag (yellow card) 90+6'	Stadium: Prenton Park; Attendance: 566; Referee: Peter Gibbons

15 December 2019	Bristol City	P–P	West Ham United	Filton
15:00				Stadium: Stoke Gifford Stadium
Note: Postponed due to waterlogged pitch

5 January 2020	West Ham United	P–P	Everton	Romford
15:00				Stadium: Rush Green Stadium
Note: Postponed due to flu outbreak

12 January 2020 10	Tottenham Hotspur	2–1	West Ham United	Canons Park
14:00	Green (yellow card) 17'; Mitchell 30'; Ayane (yellow card) 83'; Dean 90+6'	Report	Fisk (yellow card) 69'; Galabadaarachchi (yellow card) 82'; Flaherty (yellow card) 84'; Dali 90'	Stadium: The Hive Stadium; Attendance: 855

19 January 2020 11	West Ham United	2–1	Brighton & Hove Albion	Romford
15:00	Kiernan (yellow card) 50'; Lehmann 79', 83'	Report	Kerkdijk 23', (yellow card) 63'; Barton (yellow card) 51'	Stadium: Rush Green Stadium; Attendance: 1,799; Referee: Ryan Atkin

2 February 2020 12	Chelsea	8–0	West Ham United	Kingston upon Thames
14:00	Mjelde 7', 61'; England 12', 56'; Ingle 44'; Cuthbert 52'; Bachmann 87'; Murphy 90+1'	Report	Flaherty (yellow card) 26'; Longhurst (yellow card) 49'; Brosnan (yellow card) 90+2'	Stadium: Kingsmeadow; Attendance: 3,304; Referee: Amy Fearn

9 February 2020	West Ham United	P–P	Manchester City	Romford
15:00				Stadium: Rush Green Stadium
Note: All WSL games postponed due to adverse weather conditions

12 February 2020 13	Reading	2–0	West Ham United	High Wycombe
19:30	Moore 24', (yellow card) 77'; Chaplen 63'; Laws (yellow card) 88'	Report	Longhurst (yellow card) 24'; Galabadaarachchi (yellow card) 59'	Stadium: Adams Park; Attendance: 573; Referee: Abigail Byrne

23 February 2020 14	West Ham United	4–2	Liverpool	Romford
15:00	Leon 26', 60'; Thomas 27', 52'	Report	Furness 71', 90'; Lawley (yellow card) 77'	Stadium: Rush Green Stadium; Attendance: 1,877; Referee: Matthew Russell

22 March 2020 15	Manchester United	Cancelled	West Ham United	Leigh
12:00				Stadium: Leigh Sports Village
Note: Cancelled due to coronavirus pandemic

29 March 2020 16	West Ham United	Cancelled	Arsenal	Romford
12:00				Stadium: Rush Green Stadium
Note: Cancelled due to coronavirus pandemic

1 April 2020 17	West Ham United	Cancelled	Everton	Romford
19:30				Stadium: Rush Green Stadium
Note: Rescheduled from 5 January 2020. Cancelled due to coronavirus pandemic

5 April 2020 18	Birmingham City	Cancelled	West Ham United	Solihull
14:00				Stadium: Damson Park
Note: Cancelled due to coronavirus pandemic

22 April 2020 19	West Ham United	Cancelled	Manchester City	Romford
19:30				Stadium: Rush Green Stadium
Note: Rescheduled from 9 February 2020. Cancelled due to coronavirus pandemic

26 April 2020 20	Everton	Cancelled	West Ham United	Liverpool
12:30				Stadium: Walton Hall Park

3 May 2020 21	Bristol City	Cancelled	West Ham United	Filton
15:00				Stadium: Stoke Gifford Stadium
Note: Rescheduled from 15 December 2019. Cancelled due to coronavirus pandemic

16 May 2020 22	West Ham United	Cancelled	Bristol City	Romford
				Stadium: Rush Green Stadium
Note: Cancelled due to coronavirus pandemic

=== League table ===
Pos	Team	Pld	W	D	L	GF	GA	GD	Pts	PPG
6	Everton	14	6	1	7	21	21	0	19	1.36
7	Tottenham Hotspur	15	6	2	7	15	24	−9	20	1.33
8	West Ham United	14	5	1	8	19	34	−15	16	1.14
9	Brighton & Hove Albion	16	3	4	9	11	30	−19	13	0.81
10	Bristol City	14	2	3	9	9	38	−29	9	0.64

Source: FA WSL, BBC
Rules for classification: Initially: 1) Points; 2) Goal difference; 3) Number of goals scored. After abandonment of season: 1) Points per game

== Women's FA Cup ==
As a member of the top two tiers, West Ham entered the FA Cup in the fourth round, losing 2–0 to Arsenal in one of only two all-WSL ties.

26 January 2020 Fourth round	West Ham United	0–2	Arsenal	Romford
		Report	McCabe 16'; Wälti 73'	Stadium: Rush Green Stadium; Attendance: 959

== FA Women's League Cup ==
=== Group stage ===
22 September 2019 Group stage	Chelsea	2–0	West Ham United	Kingston upon Thames
14:00	England 55'; Reiten 75'	Report	Leon (yellow card) 36'; Kiernan (yellow card) 78'	Stadium: Kingsmeadow; Attendance: 3,041; Referee: Kirsty Dowle

20 October 2019 Group stage	West Ham United	2–2 (2–4 p)	Tottenham Hotspur	Romford
15:00	Thomas 90'; Dali 90+3'	Report	Dean 52'; Green 83'; Percival (yellow card) 90'	Stadium: Rush Green Stadium; Attendance: 749; Referee: Elizabeth Simms
	Penalties
	Flaherty (penalty missed); Baunach (penalty scored); Leon (penalty missed); Dali (penalty scored)		(penalty scored) Peplow; (penalty scored) Quinn; (penalty missed) Graham; (penalty scored) Dean; (penalty scored) Furness

3 November 2019 Group stage	Reading	0–1	West Ham United	Reading
14:00	Pacheco (yellow card) 75'	Report	Dali (yellow card) 52'; Middag (yellow card) 69'; Lehmann 75'	Stadium: Madjeski Stadium; Attendance: 877; Referee: Ryan Atkins

20 November 2019 Group stage	West Ham United	3–1	Lewes	Romford
19:30	Kiernan 24'; Dali 29' (pen.), 40'; Kiszkis (yellow card) 74'	Report	Winchester 78'	Stadium: Rush Green Stadium; Attendance: 652; Referee: Kirsty Dowle

11 December 2019 Group stage	West Ham United	7–0	Crystal Palace	Romford
19:30	Kiernan 15'; Vetterlein 42'; Leon 45'; Dali 48', 71'; Longhurst 70', 74'	Report	L. Rutherford (yellow card) 67'; Stobbs (yellow card) 80'	Stadium: Rush Green Stadium; Attendance: 336; Referee: Aji Ajibola

Pos	Team	Pld	W	WPEN	LPEN	L	GF	GA	GD	Pts	Qualification	CHE	REA	WHU	TOT	CRY	LEW
1	Chelsea	5	4	0	1	0	13	3	+10	13	Advance to Knock-out stage	—	1–1	2–0	5–1	—	—
2	Reading	5	3	1	0	1	14	4	+10	11	Advance to Knock-out stage	—	—	0–1	—	6–0	3–2
3	West Ham United	5	3	0	1	1	13	5	+8	10		—	—	—	2–2	7–0	3–1
4	Tottenham Hotspur	5	2	1	0	2	12	11	+1	8		—	0–4	—	—	—	6–0
5	Crystal Palace	5	1	0	0	4	3	21	−18	3		0–3	—	—	0–3	—	—
6	Lewes	5	0	0	0	5	6	17	−11	0		1–2	—	—	—	2–3	—

Updated to match(es) played on 11 December 2019. Source: thefa.com
Rules for classification: 1) Points; 2) Goal difference; 3) Number of goals scored; 4) Number of wins; 5) Head-to-head record

== Squad statistics ==
=== Appearances ===
Starting appearances are listed first, followed by substitute appearances after the + symbol where applicable.

No.	Pos	Nat	Player	Total		FA WSL		FA Cup		League Cup	
No.	Pos	Nat	Player	Apps	Goals	Apps	Goals	Apps	Goals	Apps	Goals
1	GK	(England) ENG	Anna Moorhouse	8	0	4	0	0	0	4	0
2	DF	(Norway) NOR	Cecilie Kvamme	18	0	10+3	0	1	0	4	0
5	DF	(England) ENG	Gilly Flaherty	19	0	14	0	1	0	4	0
7	FW	(Switzerland) SUI	Alisha Lehmann	18	4	11+2	3	1	0	4	1
8	FW	(Republic of Ireland) IRL	Leanne Kiernan	14	3	7+2	1	1	0	2+2	2
9	FW	(Scotland) SCO	Martha Thomas	13	5	10	4	0	0	1+2	1
10	MF	(Germany) GER	Julia Simic	7	0	2+3	0	1	0	0+1	0
11	DF	(Germany) GER	Katharina Baunach	17	3	12	3	1	0	4	0
12	MF	(England) ENG	Kate Longhurst	19	2	11+2	0	1	0	4+1	2
13	DF	(Sweden) SWE	Filippa Wallén	2	0	0+2	0	0	0	0	0
15	FW	(Australia) AUS	Jacynta Galabadaarachchi	17	0	5+6	0	1	0	4+1	0
16	FW	(Republic of Ireland) IRL	Ruesha Littlejohn	4	0	0+2	0	0+1	0	0+1	0
17	FW	(Netherlands) NED	Esmee de Graaf	4	0	0+2	0	1	0	1	0
18	GK	(Republic of Ireland) IRL	Courtney Brosnan	12	0	10	0	1	0	1	0
19	FW	(Canada) CAN	Adriana Leon	16	6	7+4	5	0	0	4+1	1
20	MF	(South Korea) KOR	Cho So-hyun	11	0	6+2	0	0	0	2+1	0
21	MF	(France) FRA	Kenza Dali	19	7	12+2	2	1	0	4	5
22	DF	(England) ENG	Grace Fisk	6	0	5	0	1	0	0	0
23	MF	(Netherlands) NED	Tessel Middag	19	0	9+4	0	0+1	0	3+2	0
24	MF	(Poland) POL	Wiktoria Kiszkis	3	0	0+1	0	0	0	0+2	0
25	DF	(England) ENG	Olivia Smith	0	0	0	0	0	0	0	0
26	DF	(Germany) GER	Laura Vetterlein	17	2	13	1	0	0	4	1
Players away from the club on loan:
14	DF	(England) ENG	Vyan Sampson	0	0	0	0	0	0	0	0
Players who appeared for West Ham United but left during the season:
3	DF	(United States) USA	Erin Simon	3	0	2	0	0	0	0+1	0
4	DF	(United States) USA	Brooke Hendrix	12	0	4+3	0	0	0	5	0

=== Goalscorers ===
Rank	No.	Pos.	Name	FA WSL	FA Cup	League Cup	Total
1	21	MF	(France) Kenza Dali	2	0	5	7
2	19	FW	(Canada) Adriana Leon	5	0	1	6
3	9	FW	(Scotland) Martha Thomas	4	0	1	5
4	7	FW	(Switzerland) Alisha Lehmann	3	0	1	4
5	8	FW	(Republic of Ireland) Leanne Kiernan	1	0	2	3
5	11	DF	(Germany) Katharina Baunach	3	0	0	3
7	12	MF	(England) Kate Longhurst	0	0	2	2
7	26	DF	(Germany) Laura Vetterlein	1	0	1	2
Total				19	0	13	32

== Transfers ==
=== Transfers in ===
Date	Position	Nationality	Name	From	Ref.
12 July 2019	DF	(Germany)	Laura Vetterlein	(Germany) SC Sand	
16 July 2019	FW	(Scotland)	Martha Thomas	(France) Le Havre	
19 July 2019	FW	(Australia)	Jacynta Galabadaarachchi	(Australia) Perth Glory	
25 July 2019	MF	(France)	Kenza Dali	(France) Dijon	
1 August 2019	DF	(Germany)	Katharina Baunach	(Germany) VfL Wolfsburg	
9 August 2019	GK	(United States)	Courtney Brosnan	(France) Le Havre	
16 August 2019	DF	(Norway)	Cecilie Kvamme	(Norway) IL Sandviken	
3 November 2019	FW	(Republic of Ireland)	Ruesha Littlejohn	(England) London Bees	
30 December 2019	DF	(England)	Grace Fisk	(United States) South Carolina Gamecocks	
4 January 2020	DF	(Sweden)	Filippa Wallén	(Sweden) IF Brommapojkarna	
25 January 2020	DF	(England)	Olivia Smith (Note: Signed on non-contract terms)	(United States) UCF Knights	

=== Transfers out ===
Date	Position	Nationality	Name	To	Ref.
1 July 2019	MF	(Netherlands)	Lucienne Reichardt	Retired	
1 July 2019	DF	(England)	Claire Rafferty	Retired	
1 July 2019	FW	(England)	Rosie Kmita	(England) London Bees	
4 July 2019	FW	(Scotland)	Jane Ross	(England) Manchester United	
5 July 2019	GK	(England)	Becky Spencer	(England) Tottenham Hotspur	
5 July 2019	DF	(New Zealand)	Ria Percival	(England) Tottenham Hotspur	
18 July 2019	MF	(United States)	Brianna Visalli	(England) Birmingham City	
4 January 2020	DF	(United States)	Brooke Hendrix	(United States) Washington Spirit	
24 January 2020	DF	(United States)	Erin Simon	(United States) Houston Dash	

=== Loans out ===
Date	Position	Nationality	Name	To	Until	Ref.
18 August 2019	DF	(England)	Vyan Sampson	(England) London City Lionesses	End of season	
