= Alisa Vetterlein =

German footballer (born 1988)

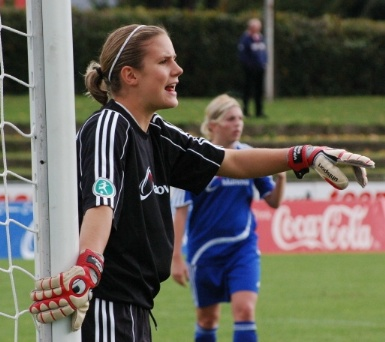

Personal information
- Full name: Alisa Vetterlein
- Date of birth: 22 October 1988 (age 38)
- Place of birth: Rheinfelden, West Germany
- Height: 1.69 m (5 ft 7 in)
- Position: Goalkeeper

Senior career*
Years	Team	Apps	(Gls)
2004–2006	SC Freiburg	5	(0)
2006–2008	VfL Sindelfingen	2	(0)
2008–2009	1. FFC Frankfurt	0	(0)
2009–2013	VfL Wolfsburg	69	(0)
2013–2015	Hoffenheim	18	(0)
- * Club domestic league appearances and goals

Alisa Vetterlein (born 22 October 1988) is a German former football goalkeeper, who played for various teams in the Bundesliga. She is the older sister of Laura Vetterlein.

== Club career ==
In 2009, Vetterlein transferred from 1. FFC Frankfurt to VfL Wolfsburg. She made 63 Bundesliga appearances for Wolfsburg and became their first choice goalkeeper. In June 2013, she opted to leave Wolfsburg so that she could join TSG Hoffenheim, for a new challenge. On 3 February 2015, her departure from TSG Hoffenheim was announced by the club.

== International career ==
As a Germany under-19 international she won the 2007 U-19 European Championship. She was included into the tournament's all-star team.
