= Wiktoria Kiszkis =

Polish association football player

Personal information
- Full name: Wiktoria Kiszkis
- Date of birth: 14 June 2003 (age 23)
- Place of birth: Iława, Poland
- Height: 1.73 m (5 ft 8 in)
- Position: Forward

Team information
- Current team: Brentford
- Number: 29

Youth career
- 2011–2012: Leyton United
- 2012–2013: Shenfield Football Academy
- 2013–2016: Millwall Lionesses
- 2016–2019: Arsenal
- 2019: West Ham United

Senior career*
Years	Team	Apps	(Gls)
2019–2022	West Ham United	2	(0)
2021–2022	→ Śląsk Wrocław (loan)	2	(0)
2025–2026	Leyton Orient		
2026–	Brentford		

International career
2018–2020	Poland U17	17	(7)
2021	Poland U19	1	(0)
- * Club domestic league appearances and goals as of 21:27, 2 June 2026 (UTC)

Wiktoria Kiszkis (born 14 June 2003) is a Polish professional footballer who plays as a forward for English club Brentford.

== Early life ==
Kiszkis was born in Iława, Poland. Her father Michał moved to London in 2004 and he was joined by Kiszkis and her mother Agnieszka the following year. Kiszkis displayed an aptitude for football and was accepted into the Arsenal academy. In 2018–19 she played 13 times for Arsenal's youth team, scoring 30 goals and serving 23 assists.

== Club career ==
Kiszkis joined West Ham United ahead of their 2019–20 season. She made her senior debut on 20 October 2019, as a 77th-minute substitute for Kate Longhurst in a 2–2 FA Women's League Cup draw with Tottenham Hotspur. Her first appearance in the FA Women's Super League came on 17 November 2019 at Manchester City, when she replaced Adriana Leon in injury time. She registered one shot, hitting the post in a 5–0 defeat.

On 21 January 2021, she returned to Poland to join Ekstraliga club Śląsk Wrocław on an initial half-year loan. Not registered to play during that period, her loan was extended for another year in July 2021. She left Śląsk in June the following year after making two league appearances and recording one assist.

== International career ==
In September 2017, Kiszkis debuted for the Poland under-15 team, scoring in a 1–1 draw with the Czech Republic. As a 14-year-old, Kiszkis was part of the under-17 squad to contest the 2018 UEFA Women's Under-17 Championship and later captained the team in 2019.

== Career statistics ==
Appearances and goals by club, season and competition
Club	Season	League			National cup		League cup (Note: Includes FA League Cup)		Total	
Club	Season	Division	Apps	Goals	Apps	Goals	Apps	Goals	Apps	Goals
West Ham United	2019–20	FA WSL	1	0	0	0	2	0	3	0
West Ham United	2020–21	FA WSL	1	0	0	0	0	0	1	0
West Ham United	Total		2	0	0	0	2	0	4	0
Śląsk Wrocław (loan)	2021–22	Ekstraliga	2	0	0	0	—		2	0
Career total			4	0	0	0	2	0	6	0
