= Cecilie Redisch Kvamme =

Norwegian footballer (born 1995)

Cecilie Kvamme
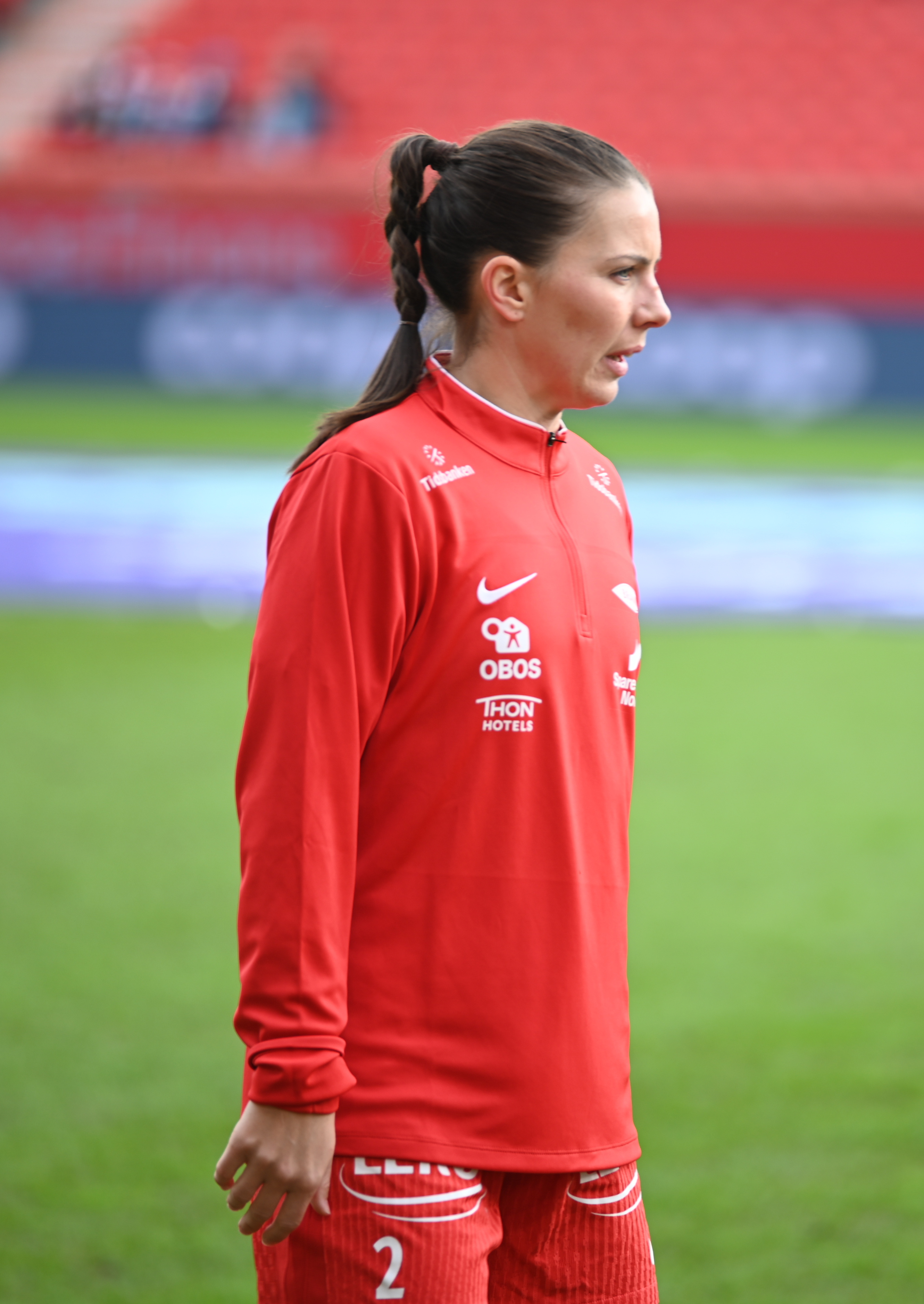
- Cecilie Redisch Kvamme in 2026

Personal information
- Full name: Cecilie Redisch Kvamme
- Date of birth: 11 September 1995 (age 31)
- Place of birth: Norway,
- Height: 1.58 m (5 ft 2 in)
- Position: Defender

Youth career
- Tertnes

Senior career*
Years	Team	Apps	(Gls)
–2012	Tertnes	0	(0)
2012–2018	Arna-Bjørnar	136	(12)
2019	Sandviken	9	(0)
2019–2021	West Ham United	32	(0)
2021–2026	Brann	71	(8)

International career^{‡}
2012	Norway U18	4	(1)
2013–2014	Norway U20	11	(1)
2014–2018	Norway U23	18	(0)
2019–2021	Norway	5	(0)
- * Club domestic league appearances and goals as of 6 September 2025 ‡ National team caps and goals as of 21 May 2021

Cecilie Redisch Kvamme (born 11 September 1995) is a Norwegian former professional footballer who played as a defender.

Kvamme was born in Norway and played youth football for Tertnes before starting her professional career with Arna-Bjornar just outside Bergen. After a short spell at Sandviken, she joined English WSL club West Ham in 2019. She played two seasons with West Ham before returning to Sandviken in 2021.

Kvamme currently has five caps for Norway.

== Career statistics ==
=== Club ===
As of 21 May 2021.

Club	Season	League			Cup		League Cup		Total	
Club	Season	Division	Apps	Goals	Apps	Goals	Apps	Goals	Apps	Goals
Arna-Bjørnar	2012	Toppserien	12	2	3	0	0	0	15	2
Arna-Bjørnar	2013	Toppserien	20	3	3	1	0	0	23	4
Arna-Bjørnar	2014	Toppserien	20	1	1	0	0	0	21	1
Arna-Bjørnar	2015	Toppserien	21	1	1	0	0	0	22	1
Arna-Bjørnar	2016	Toppserien	22	1	2	0	0	0	24	1
Arna-Bjørnar	2017	Toppserien	20	2	3	1	0	0	23	3
Arna-Bjørnar	2018	Toppserien	21	2	3	0	0	0	24	2
Arna-Bjørnar	Club total		136	12	16	2	0	0	152	14
Sandviken	2019	Toppserien	9	0	0	0	0	0	9	0
West Ham	2019-20	FA WSL	13	0	1	0	4	0	18	0
West Ham	2020-21	FA WSL	19	0	1	1	4	0	24	1
West Ham	Club total		32	0	2	1	8	0	42	1
Career total			177	12	18	3	8	0	203	15
