= Laura Vetterlein =

German footballer (born 1992)

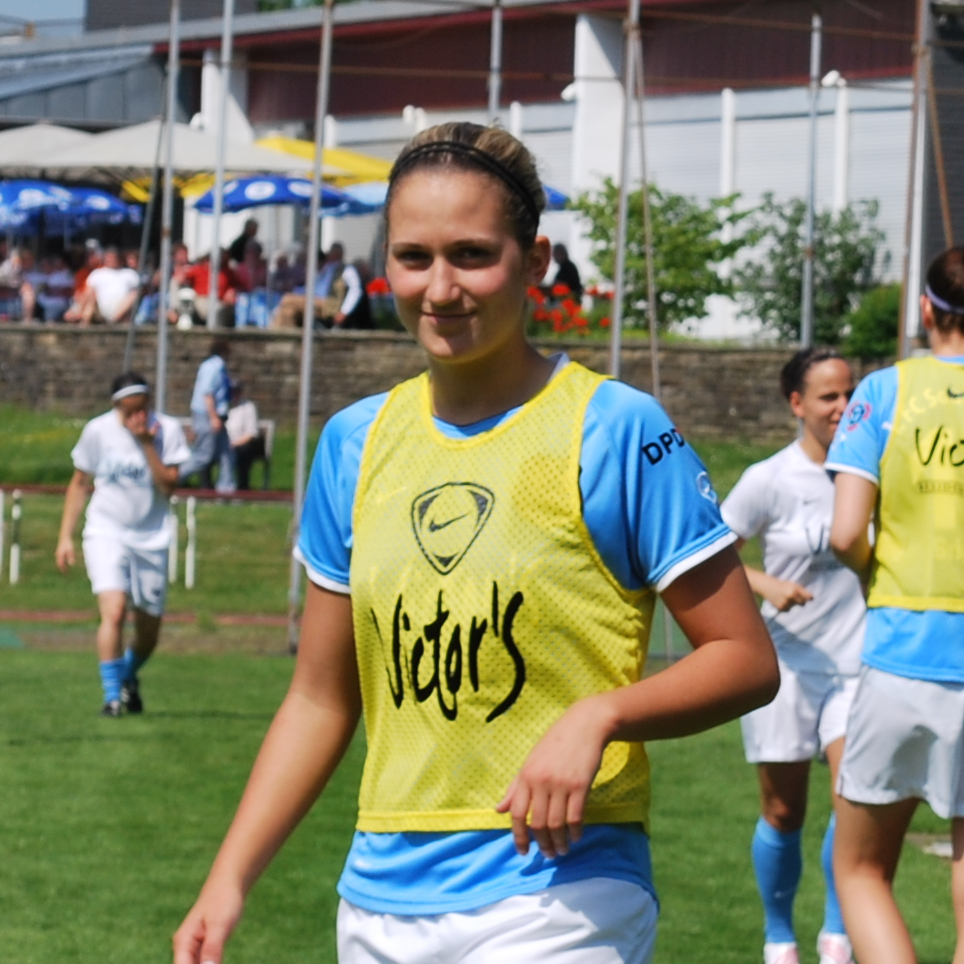
- With Saarbrücken in 2009

Personal information
- Full name: Laura Vetterlein
- Date of birth: 7 April 1992 (age 34)
- Place of birth: Rheinfelden, Germany
- Height: 1.70 m (5 ft 7 in)
- Position: Defender

Team information
- Current team: Zürich
- Number: 26

Youth career
- SV Nollingen

Senior career*
Years	Team	Apps	(Gls)
2008–2011	Saarbrücken	48	(0)
2011–2015	Wolfsburg	5	(1)
2013–2015	Wolfsburg II	12	(0)
2015–2019	SC Sand	63	(1)
2019–2021	West Ham United	30	(1)
2021–	Zürich	0	(0)

International career^{‡}
2007	Germany U15	5	(0)
2007–2008	Germany U16	8	(0)
2008–2009	Germany U17	10	(1)
2009–2010	Germany U19	4	(0)
2011–2012	Germany U20	4	(0)
- * Club domestic league appearances and goals as of 02:20, 28 April 2020 (UTC) ‡ National team caps and goals as of 12:59, 21 December 2019 (UTC)

Laura Vetterlein (born 7 April 1992) is a German footballer, who plays as a defender for FC Zürich Frauen in Switzerland. She is the younger sister of Alisa Vetterlein.

== Club career ==
Vetterlein's early interest in football was inspired by her sister Alisa. She joined SV Nollingen's youth system when she was five years old and got a special permit from the German Football Association to keep playing in boys' youth teams until she was 16.

She began her senior career in 2008, electing to join 1. FC Saarbrücken who had just been relegated from the Frauen-Bundesliga and were looking to give younger players a chance in their team. Vetterlein played 48 league matches for Saarbrücken over three seasons and helped them reclaim their place in the top division. But when they were relegated again in 2011 she transferred to Wolfsburg, where her sister was also contracted.

Wolfsburg won the UEFA Women's Champions League in consecutive seasons, but Vetterlein was an unused substitute in both the 2013 and 2014 finals. When her contract was not renewed she agreed a free transfer to SC Sand in May 2015, alongside Wolfsburg teammate Jovana Damnjanović.

In July 2019 Vetterlein signed for FA Women's Super League club West Ham United.

== International career ==
Between April 2007 and February 2012 Vetterlein played 31 matches for Germany's youth international teams, ranging from under-15 to under-20 level.
