= Filippa Wallen =

Swedish footballer

Personal information
- Date of birth: 21 January 2000 (age 26)
- Place of birth: Sweden
- Height: 1.69 m (5 ft 7 in)
- Position: Defender

Team information
- Current team: IF Brommapojkarna
- Number: 24

Senior career*
| Years | Team | Apps | (Gls) |
| 2012–2017 | AIK | 3 | (0) |
| 2017–2020 | IF Brommapojkarna | 25 | (0) |
| 2020 | West Ham United | 2 | (0) |
| 2020 | Apollon Ladies | 0 | (0) |
| 2021 | Vittsjö GIK | 11 | (0) |
| 2022– | IF Brommapojkarna | 2 | (0) |

International career^{‡}
| 2015–2016 | Sweden U-17 | 3 | (0) |
- * Club domestic league appearances and goals as of 28 August 2020 ‡ National team caps and goals as of 22 March 2020

Filippa Wallen (born 21 January 2000) is a Swedish professional footballer who plays as a defender for IF Brommapojkarna in the Damallsvenskan. She previously played for IF Brommapojkarna and AIK in Sweden. Wallen represented Sweden on the under-17 national team.

== Playing career ==
=== Club ===
In January 2020, Wallen signed with West Ham United for the 2019–20 FA WSL season. Of the signing, manager Matt Beard noted, "Filippa is a talented and pacey full-back who has already shown her quality, despite her young age, in Swedish football."

=== International ===
Wallen represented Sweden on the under-17 national team.
