= Katharina Baunach =

German footballer

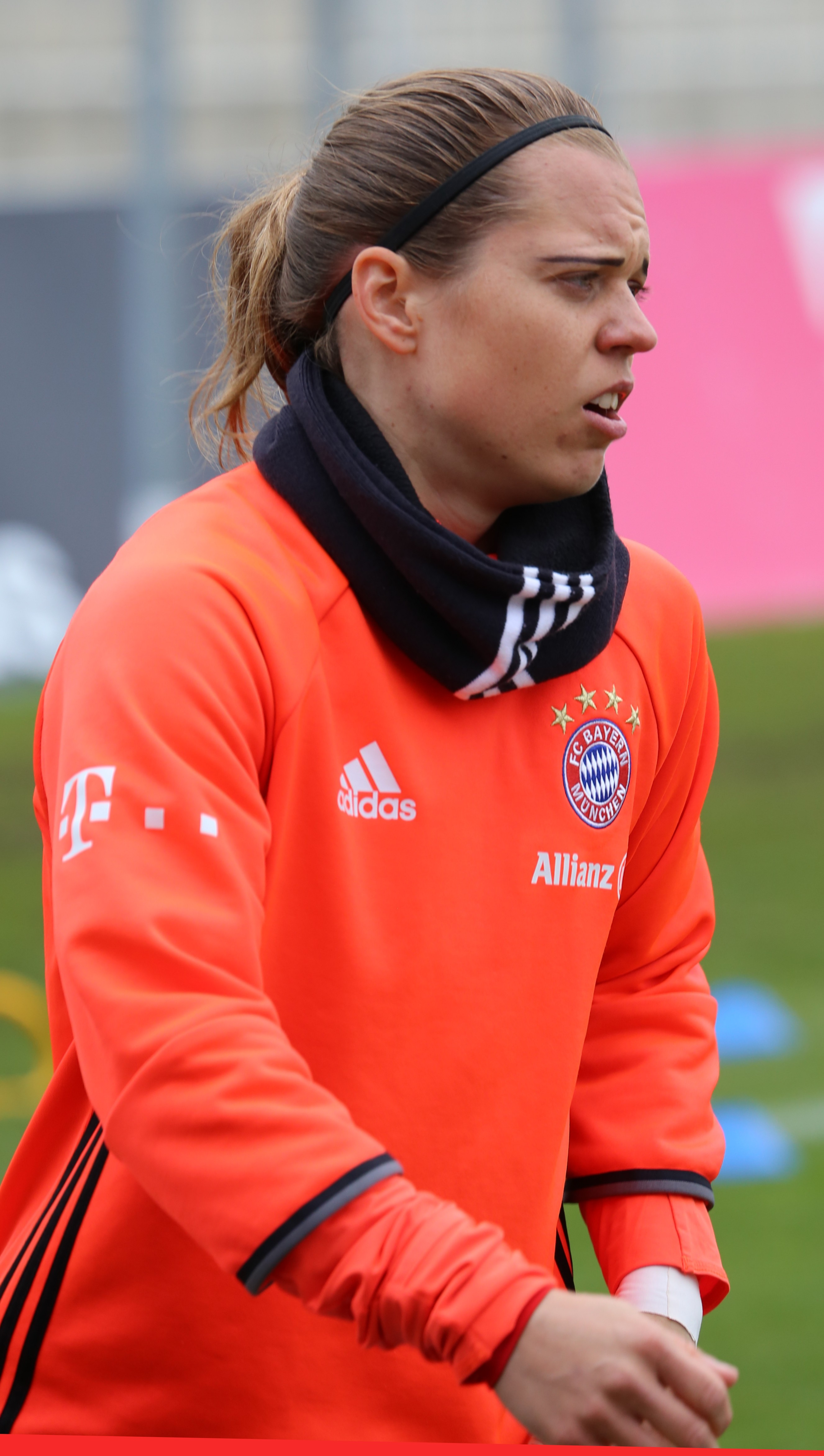
- Baunach with Bayern Munich in 2016

Personal information
- Full name: Katharina Baunach
- Date of birth: 18 January 1989 (age 37)
- Place of birth: Würzburg, West Germany
- Height: 1.65 m (5 ft 5 in)
- Positions: Defender; midfielder

Youth career
- 1994–2003: Post SV Sieboldshöhe Würzburg
- 2003–2006: SV 67 Weinberg

Senior career*
Years	Team	Apps	(Gls)
2006	SV 67 Weinberg	6	(1)
2006–2017	Bayern Munich	136	(16)
2017–2019	VfL Wolfsburg	9	(0)
2019–2020	West Ham United	12	(3)
Total		163	(20)

International career
2004	Germany U15	4	(0)
2004–2005	Germany U17	25	(5)
2006–2008	Germany U19	15	(3)
2008	Germany U20	9	(2)
2008–2009	Germany U23	5	(1)
2009	Germany	2	(0)
- * Club domestic league appearances and goals

Katharina Baunach (born 18 January 1989) is a German former footballer who played as a defender or midfielder. She was first called up to play in the German national team in February 2009.

== Honours ==
Bayern München

- Frauen-Bundesliga: 2014–15, 2015–16
- DFB-Pokal: 2011–12
- Bundesliga Cup: 2011

VfL Wolfsburg

- Frauen-Bundesliga: 2017–18, 2018–19
- DFB-Pokal: 2017–18, 2018–19
- UEFA Women's Champions League runner-up : 2017–18

International

- U-16 Nordic Cup: 2005
- U-19 European Championship: 2007
- FIFA U-20 Women's World Cup third place: 2008

Individual

- Fritz Walter Medal Silver: 2007
