= Liverpool Player of the Season Awards =

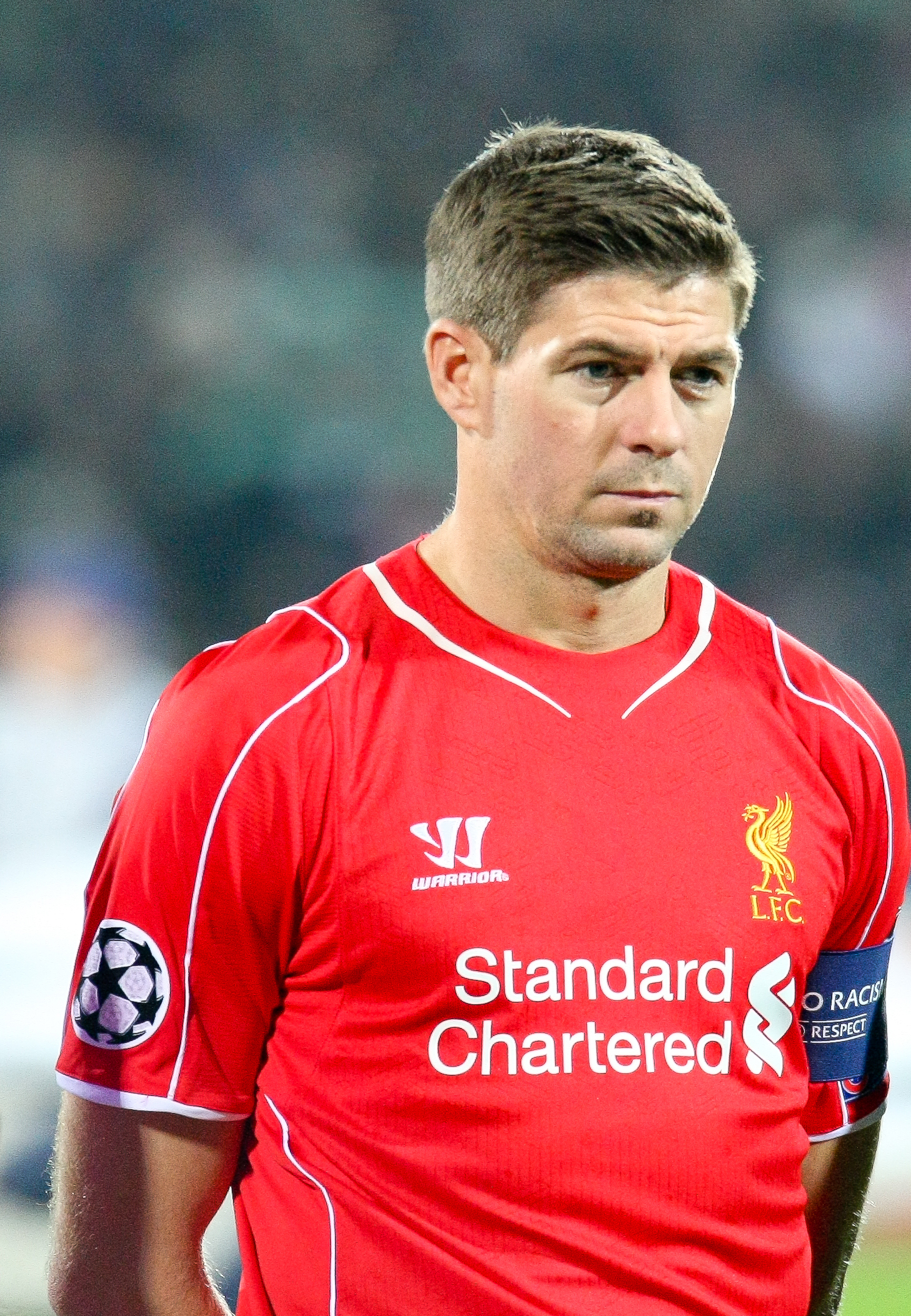
Steven Gerrard won the award a record five times (shared record with Mo Salah), including four times consecutively.

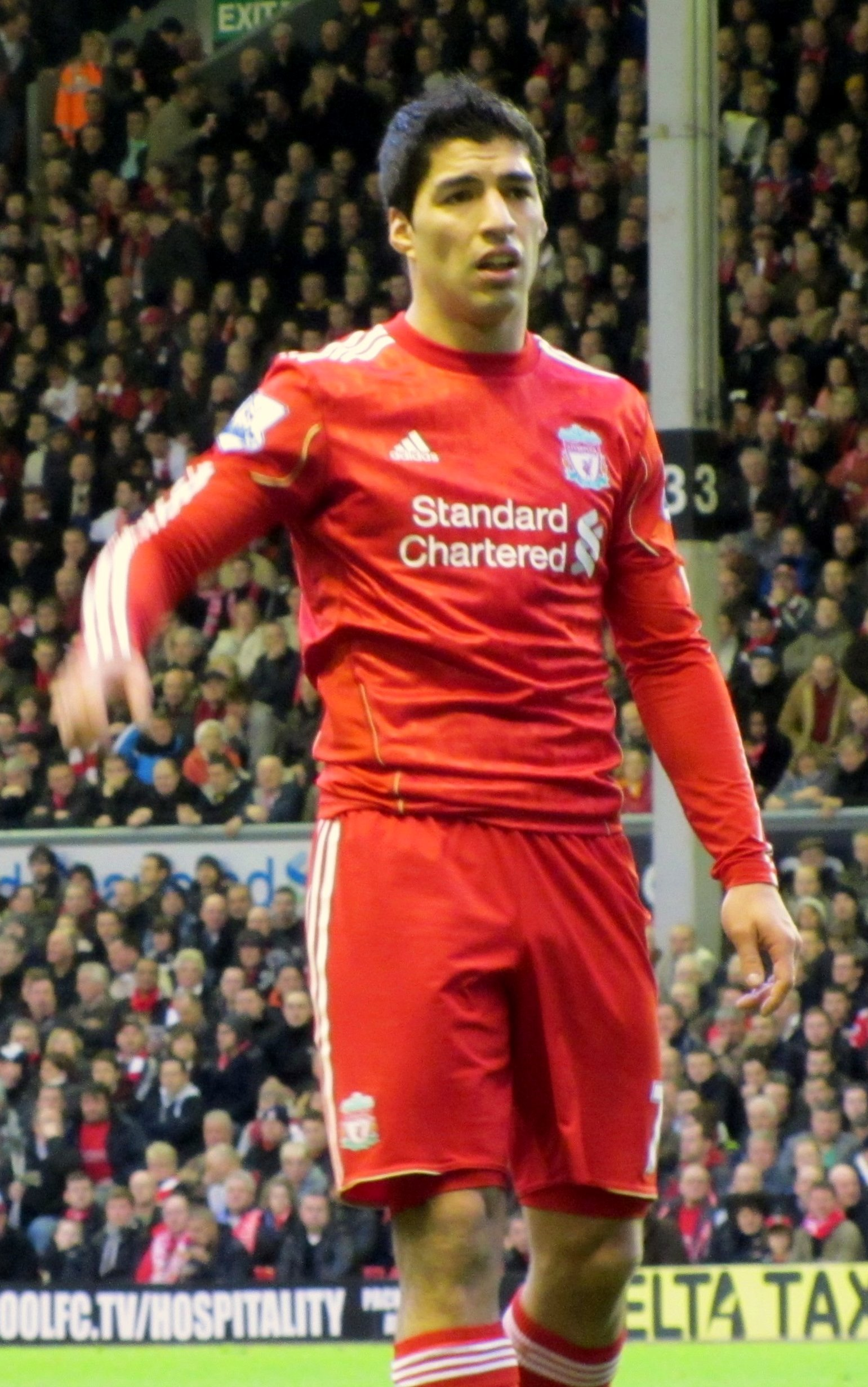
Luis Suárez was the winner of the award in the inaugural awards dinner in 2014 and one of only three players to have won the awards in consecutive years.

The Liverpool Player of the Season Award, is one of a set of official end of season awards given to the best performing player over the course of the Premier League Season as voted for by the fans. The inaugural award was handed out in 2001, with just the 'Player of the Season' Award. This title was initially awarded by fans voting on Liverpool's official club website, however the number of awards expanded following the introduction of an awards dinner, the inaugural event held in 2014, and has been held every season since. The number of awards expanded to include 'Players' Player of the Season' (as well as Fans' Player), Goal of the season and Women's Player of the season, as well as a number of other awards for academy players, technical staff and fans other outstanding services to the club.

== Awards ceremony ==
=== Awards dinner ===
Since the introduction of the awards dinner, the awards have been presented after the end of the Premier League season, usually at the start of May but held at any point during the month. The event is open to staff and fans, who may buy tickets on the club website, and has been held at a number of prominent venues, a list of which is provided below:

List of venues:
Year	Venue	Date
2014	ACC Liverpool	6 May
2015	Liverpool Arena	19 May
2016	Exhibition Centre in Liverpool	12 May
2017	Anfield Stadium	9 May
2018	Melwood Training Ground	10 May
2019	Not held due to Champions League final	
2020	Not held due to COVID-19 pandemic	
2021	Not held due to COVID-19 pandemic	

==== Trophy ====
The trophies have had a number of designs – the 2012–13 award was named 'Standard Chartered Player of the Season' for sponsorship reasons and was in the design of the Standard Chartered logo accordingly. Since this, the trophies have taken the form of an opaque circle within a hollow circle emblazoned with the Liverpool logo.

== Winners ==
=== Men's Player of the Season Award ===
The Fans' Player of the season is determined through a vote on the LFC website in which 5 candidates are nominated by the club. Fans are then free to vote for their player of choice. The player with the greatest number of votes wins the award. This award has been presented from 2001 onward.

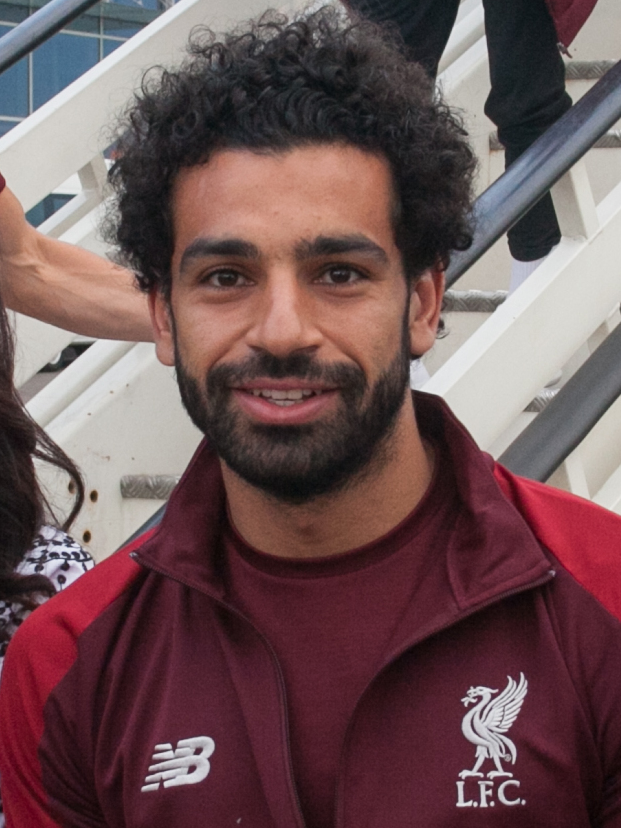
Mohamed Salah has been named Liverpool Men's Player of the Season five times, (shared record with Gerrard) and the most wins by a non-British player.

The Players' player of the year award is given to the player at the club with the greatest number of votes from teammates. This award has been presented from the 2013–14 season onwards. However, in every year both awards have been presented, they have both gone to the same player.

Season	Players'/Writers' Player	Fans' Player	Score	2nd	3rd	4th	5th
2001–02		(Finland) Sami Hyypiä	30%	Dudek	Riise	Hamann	Henchoz
2002–03		(England) Danny Murphy	42%	Gerrard	Owen	Hyypiä	Riise
2003–04	Writers' Player	(England) Steven Gerrard	85%	Owen	Kewell	Dudek	Hyypiä
2004–05	(England) Jamie Carragher	(England) Steven Gerrard	129 pts.	Carragher	Alonso	Baroš	García
2005–06		(England) Steven Gerrard	33%	Carragher	Alonso	Sissoko	Finnan
2006–07	(England) Steven Gerrard	(England) Steven Gerrard	60 pts.	Kuyt	Bellamy	Alonso	Agger
2007–08		(Spain) Fernando Torres	78%	Gerrard	Mascherano	Carragher	Kuyt
2008–09		(England) Steven Gerrard	46%	Alonso	Kuyt	Benayoun	Hyypiä
2009–10		(Spain) Pepe Reina	75%	Torres	Mascherano		
2010–11		(Brazil) Lucas Leiva	40%	Kuyt	Reina	Meireles	Suárez
2011–12		(Slovakia) Martin Škrtel	44%	Suárez	Agger		
2012–13	Players' Player	(Uruguay) Luis Suárez	64%	Gerrard	Carragher	Agger	Coutinho
2013–14	(Uruguay) Luis Suárez	(Uruguay) Luis Suárez					
2014–15	(Brazil) Philippe Coutinho	(Brazil) Philippe Coutinho					
2015–16	(Brazil) Philippe Coutinho	(Brazil) Philippe Coutinho					
2016–17	(Senegal) Sadio Mané	(Senegal) Sadio Mané					
2017–18	(Egypt) Mohamed Salah	(Egypt) Mohamed Salah					
2018–19	(Netherlands) Virgil van Dijk	(Netherlands) Virgil van Dijk	47%	Salah	Mané	Alexander-Arnold	Robertson
2019–20		(England) Jordan Henderson		Mané	Alexander-Arnold		
2020–21	(Egypt) Mohamed Salah	(Egypt) Mohamed Salah					
2021–22	(Egypt) Mohamed Salah	(Egypt) Mohamed Salah		Alisson			
2022–23	(Brazil) Alisson	(Brazil) Alisson		Salah	Alexander-Arnold		
2023–24	(Egypt) Mohamed Salah	(Egypt) Mohamed Salah		van Dijk	Mac Allister		
2024–25	(Egypt) Mohamed Salah	(Egypt) Mohamed Salah					
2025–26	(Hungary) Dominik Szoboszlai	(Hungary) Dominik Szoboszlai					

=== Women's Player of the Season Award ===
Similarly to the men's award, a player of the season is chosen by both the fans and the players and separate awards are granted depending on the result of each vote. This award has been part of the awards night from the end of the 2013–14 season, although the fans' player award has only been presented from the end of the 2017–18 season. A Young Player of the year also is granted to the best 'young' player on the team.

Season	Players' Player	Fans' Player	Young Player of the Year	Club Person of the Season / The Red Way Award
2013–14	(Germany) Nicole Rolser			
2014–15	(England) Fara Williams			
2015–16	(England) Martha Harris			
2016–17	(Wales) Sophie Ingle			
2017–18	(Wales) Sophie Ingle	(England) Gemma Bonner		
2018–19	(England) Sophie Bradley-Auckland	(England) Amy Rodgers	(England) Amy Rodgers	
2019–20		(Nigeria) Rinsola Babajide		
2020–21		(England) Missy Bo Kearns		
2021–22	(England) Rachael Laws	(Republic of Ireland) Leanne Kiernan	(England) Taylor Hinds	(Republic of Ireland) Niamh Fahey
2022–23	(Wales) Ceri Holland	(England) Missy Bo Kearns	(England) Faye Kirby	
2023–24	(England) Grace Fisk	(Austria) Marie Höbinger	(Austria) Marie Höbinger	(Republic of Ireland) Niamh Fahey

=== Young Player of the Season/Academy Player of the Season ===
The Young Player of the Season was awarded alongside the player of the year award in 2010 and is awarded to the young player who has performed the best for Liverpool's first team that season, with the Academy's player of the year award being officially added with the introduction of the awards dinner in 2014, and being granted to the best performing player in the academy squad.

Season	Young Player of the Year	Academy Player of the Year	Notes
2009–10	(Brazil) Lucas Leiva		
2010–11			
2011–12			
2012–13			
2013–14	(England) Raheem Sterling	(England) Jordan Rossiter	
2014–15	(England) Raheem Sterling	(Portugal) João Carlos Teixeira	
2015–16	(Germany) Emre Can	(Australia) Brad Smith	
2016–17	(England) Trent Alexander-Arnold	(Wales) Ben Woodburn	
2017–18	(England) Trent Alexander-Arnold	(Wales) Harry Wilson	
2018–19	Not Awarded		
2019–20	(England) Trent Alexander-Arnold		

== Goal of the Season/Performance of the Season ==
The Goal of the Season is decided by a vote from the fans on the 'best goal' scored that season, whereas performance of the season refers to a specific performance by a player which is deemed to be the best of the season. The former has been awarded since 2014, with the latter being added to the roster of awards in 2015. The performance of the season award appears to have been discontinued following the second issue of the award in 2016.

=== Men ===
	Goal of the Season		Performance of the Season	
Season	Winner	Match	Winner	Match
2013–14	(Uruguay) Luis Suárez	1–0 vs Norwich City (4 December 2013)		
2014–15	(Brazil) Philippe Coutinho	1–0 vs Southampton (22 February 2015)	(Brazil) Philippe Coutinho	vs Manchester City (1 March 2015)
2015–16	(Brazil) Philippe Coutinho	1–1 vs Manchester United (17 March 2016)	(Brazil) Philippe Coutinho	vs Manchester City (21 November 2015)
2016–17	(Germany) Emre Can	1–0 vs Watford (1 May 2017)		
2017–18	(England) Alex Oxlade-Chamberlain	2–0 vs Manchester City (4 April 2018)		
2018–19	(Egypt) Mohamed Salah	2–0 vs Chelsea (14 April 2019)		
2020–21	(Brazil) Alisson	2–1 vs West Brom (16 May 2021)		
2021–22	(Egypt) Mohamed Salah	2–1 vs Manchester City (3 October 2021)		
2022–23	(Egypt) Mohamed Salah	1–0 vs Manchester City (16 October 2022)		
2023–24	(Argentina) Alexis Mac Allister	2–1 vs Fulham (3 December 2023)		
2024–25	(Argentina) Alexis Mac Allister	2–1 vs Tottenham Hotspur (27 April 2025)		
2025–26	(Hungary) Dominik Szoboszlai	1–0 vs Arsenal (31 August 2025)		

=== Women ===
	Goal of the Season		Performance of the Season	
Season	Winner	Match	Winner	Match
2023–24	(England) Mia Enderby	3–4 vs Manchester City (8 November 2023)		

== Club awards ==
Since the inception of the awards dinner, a number of awards celebrating non-players have been introduced. Some of these awards have been presented in every awards dinner since 2014, whereas others have been one-off recognition, or been discontinued in place of other awards. A total of 8 different awards have been issued and presented so far, the criteria for winning each award explained the list of winners below:

=== Winners ===
Season	Outstanding Achievement Award	Bill Shankly Community Award	Lifetime Achievement	Staff Recognition	SupportersClub	Fan of the year	Special Recognition	Outstanding Team Achievement
2013–14	(Northern Ireland) Brendan Rodgers	(Brazil) Lucas Leiva	(England) Ronnie Moran	Matt Walker (Senior TV Producer)	(France) OLSC Paris	(Poland) Rado Chmiel		
2014–15	(England) Steven Gerrard	Chris Anders	(Scotland) Ron Yeats & (Scotland) Ian St John	Ian Wallace	(England) OLSC London			
2015–16		Marie Rooney	(Republic of Ireland) Steve Heighway	Terry Forsyth	(South Africa) Gauteng			
2016–17		Jeremy Barnes	(England) Roger Hunt	Disability Support Team	Cyprus		(Brazil) Lucas Leiva	1977 Euro Cup Winning Squad
2017–18		Fans Supporting Foodbanks	(England) Ian Callaghan		(Australia) New South Wales			1978 Euro Cup Winning Squad
2018–19	Awards not held due to busy First Team Schedule and Champions League Final							
2019–20	Awards not held due to the COVID-19 pandemic							

=== Award Criteria ===
Outstanding Achievement Award – Awarded for exceptional achievement at the club. Given to Brendan Rodgers in 2014 for leading Liverpool back into the Champions League, and to Gerrard following his announcement of retirement in 2015 for exceptional commitment to the club. Discontinued after 2015.

Bill Shankly Community Award – Named for Bill Shankly, manager from 1959–1974 and "awarded to the person who has shown commitment to their community through supporting local projects and activities or by selflessly giving their time to help others" Can be granted to players, non-players, or organisations such as Fans Supporting Foodbanks in 2018.

Lifetime Achievement – Awarded for stellar commitment to the club over an exceptional period of time.

Staff Recognition – "for a member of club staff who is dedicated to Liverpool FC and upholds the Liverpool way" Was not awarded in 2018 and as such may have been discontinued.

Supporter's Club – Supporter's Club of the Year

Fan of the Year – A currently one-off award granted to the nominated fan of the year. Polish fan Rado Chmiel is the current only holder of this award after being discontinued in 2014

Special Recognition Award – A currently one-off award granted to award special recognition to an individual

Outstanding Team Achievement Award – Awarded to recognise historical team achievements (such as prior European Cup Winning Squads)
