= 2022–23 Liverpool F.C. Women season =

Liverpool
2022–23 season
- Head coach: Matt Beard
- Stadium: Prenton Park, Anfield (Merseyside Derby)
- Women's Super League: 7th
- FA Cup: Fourth round
- League Cup: Quarter-final
- Top goalscorer: League: Katie Stengel (9); All: Katie Stengel (10)
- Highest home attendance: 27,574 (vs. Everton, 25 September)
- Lowest home attendance: League: 1,075 (vs. West Ham United, 4 December); All: 510 (vs. West Ham United, 25 January, League Cup)
- Average home league attendance: 4,758
Home colours	Away colours	Third colours

The 2022–23 Liverpool F.C. Women season was the club's 34th season of competitive football and first season back in the Women's Super League, the highest level of the football pyramid, since their relegation at the end of the 2019–20 season. Along with competing in the WSL, the club also contested two domestic cup competitions: the FA Cup and the League Cup.

== Squad ==
As of 3 February 2023

Note: Flags indicate national team as defined under FIFA eligibility rules; some limited exceptions apply. Players may hold more than one non-FIFA nationality.

No.	Pos.	Nation	Player
1	GK	ENG	Rachael Laws
2	DF	FIN	Emma Koivisto
3	DF	ENG	Leighanne Robe
4	MF	WAL	Rhiannon Roberts
5	DF	IRL	Niamh Fahey (captain)
6	DF	ENG	Jasmine Matthews
7	MF	ENG	Missy Bo Kearns
8	MF	JPN	Fuka Nagano
9	FW	IRL	Leanne Kiernan
11	FW	ENG	Melissa Lawley
12	DF	ENG	Taylor Hinds
13	GK	CAN	Rylee Foster
15	MF	DEN	Sofie Lundgaard

No.	Pos.	Nation	Player
17	MF	ENG	Carla Humphrey
18	MF	WAL	Ceri Holland
19	FW	NED	Shanice van de Sanden
20	FW	BEL	Yana Daniëls
21	GK	SCO	Eartha Cumings
22	GK	ENG	Faye Kirby
23	DF	ENG	Gemma Bonner
24	FW	USA	Katie Stengel
28	DF	IRL	Megan Campbell
29	FW	ENG	Natasha Dowie (on loan from Reading)
34	MF	ENG	Hannah Silcock
35	MF	ENG	Miri Taylor

== Preseason ==
31 July 2022 Friendly	Liverpool	6–0	Nottingham Forest	Leasowe
	Kiernan; Stengel; Roberts; Daniëls; Furness	Report		Stadium: Tranmere Campus; Attendance: Behind-closed-doors

7 August 2022 Friendly	Liverpool	3–1	Blackburn Rovers	Birkenhead
14:00	Daniëls; Stengel	Report	Jordan	Stadium: Prenton Park

13 August 2022 Friendly	Manchester United	1–0	Liverpool	Carrington
	Galton			Stadium: Trafford Training Centre; Attendance: Behind-closed-doors

17 August 2022 Friendly	Aston Villa	0–1	Liverpool	Bodymoor Heath
14:00		Report	Kiernan	Stadium: Bodymoor Heath Training Ground; Attendance: Behind-closed-doors

21 August 2022 Friendly	West Ham United	0–5	Liverpool	Loughborough
		Report	Stengel; van de Sanden; Kiernan	Stadium: Loughborough University

27 August 2022 Friendly	Manchester City	1–1	Liverpool	Manchester
	Castellanos	Report	Koivisto	Stadium: Academy Stadium

== Women's Super League ==
=== Results summary ===
Overall								Home						Away					
Pld	W	D	L	GF	GA	GD	Pts	W	D	L	GF	GA	GD	W	D	L	GF	GA	GD
22	6	5	11	24	39	−15	23	6	0	5	12	12	0	0	5	6	12	27	−15

Last updated: 27 May 2023.
Source: FA WSL

=== Results by matchday ===
Round	1	2	3	4	5	6	7	8	9	10	11	12	13	14	15	16	17	18	19	20	21	22
Ground	H	H	A	H	A	H	A	A	H	A	H	H	A	H	A	A	H	A	A	H	A	H
Result	W	L	L	L	L	L	D	D	W	L	W	L	L	W	D	D	W	L	L	W	D	L
Position	4	7	9	9	10	10	10	10	9	9	8	8	8	8	8	8	7	7	7	7	7	7

A = Away; H = Home; W = Win; D = Draw; L = Loss

=== Results ===
11 September 2022	Reading	P–P	Liverpool	Reading
14:00				Stadium: Madejski Stadium
Note: The FA postponed all of the weekend's football fixtures following the death of Elizabeth II on 8 September 2022.

18 September 2022 1	Liverpool	2–1	Chelsea	Birkenhead
17:00	Holland (yellow card) 18'; Stengel 67' (pen.), 87' (pen.); Campbell (yellow card) 90+4'	Report	Kirby 3' (pen.)	Stadium: Prenton Park; Attendance: 3,006; Referee: Emily Heaslip

25 September 2022 2	Liverpool	0–3	Everton	Liverpool
18:45	Flaherty (yellow card) 76'	Report	Finnigan 9'; Park 33'; Bennison 87'; George (yellow card) 89'	Stadium: Anfield; Attendance: 27,574; Referee: Andrew Kitchen

16 October 2022 3	Tottenham Hotspur	1–0	Liverpool	Leyton
14:00	Fahey 11' (o.g.); Karczewska (yellow card) 71'; Turner (yellow card) 88'; Summanen (yellow card) 90+5'	Report	Furness (yellow card) 56'; Hinds (yellow card) 90+5'	Stadium: Brisbane Road; Attendance: 2,105; Referee: Abigail Byrne

23 October 2022 4	Liverpool	0–2	Arsenal	Birkenhead
12:00		Report	Wälti 15'; Maanum 22'	Stadium: Prenton Park; Attendance: 3,348; Referee: Anthony Backhouse

30 October 2022 5	Manchester City	2–1	Liverpool	Manchester
14:00	Shaw 21'; Raso 75'	Report	Stengel 33'	Stadium: Academy Stadium; Attendance: 4,002; Referee: Kirsty Dowle

6 November 2022 6	Liverpool	0–1	Aston Villa	Birkenhead
14:00	Campbell (yellow card) 56'; Koivisto (yellow card) 59'; Fahey (yellow card) 88'	Report	Pacheco (yellow card) 38'; Daly 57' (pen.), (yellow card) 67'; Leat (yellow card) 77'; Hanson (yellow card) 90+5'	Stadium: Prenton Park; Attendance: 1,719; Referee: Robert Massey-Ellis

20 November 2022 7	Brighton & Hove Albion	3–3	Liverpool	Crawley
14:00	Terland 21'; Carter 26' (pen.); Robinson 34'	Report	Bo Kearns 17'; Flaherty (yellow card) 53'; Matthews (yellow card) 56'; van de Sanden 76'; Wardlaw (yellow card) 87'; Furness 90+2'	Stadium: Broadfield Stadium; Attendance: 2,980; Referee: Abigail Byrne

24 November 2022 8	Reading	3–3	Liverpool	Reading
19:00	Primmer 45+4'; Dowie 63'; Troelsgaard 89'	Report	Stengel 16', 68'; van de Sanden (yellow card) 31'; Roberts 73'; Bo Kearns (yellow card) 75'	Stadium: Madejski Stadium; Attendance: 1,479; Referee: Amy Fearn
Note: Rescheduled from 11 September 2022.

4 December 2022 9	Liverpool	2–0	West Ham United	Birkenhead
14:00	Holland 3'; Stengel 20'	Report		Stadium: Prenton Park; Attendance: 1,075; Referee: Neil Hair

11 December 2022	Liverpool	P–P	Leicester City	Birkenhead
14:00				Stadium: Prenton Park
Note: Postponed due to frozen pitch.

15 January 2023 10	Manchester United	6–0	Liverpool	Leigh
14:05	García 6'; Russo 24'; Ladd 41'; Zelem (yellow card) 49'; Koivisto 63' (o.g.); Thomas 72'; Williams 84'	Report	van de Sanden (yellow card) 45'; Bonner (yellow card) 53'	Stadium: Leigh Sports Village; Attendance: 7,662; Referee: Kirsty Dowle

22 January 2023	Chelsea	A–A	Liverpool	Kingston upon Thames
12:30				Stadium: Kingsmeadow
Note: The match kicked off but was abandoned in the 5th minute due to safety concerns over a frozen pitch.

5 February 2023 11	Liverpool	2–0	Reading	Birkenhead
14:00	Bo Kearns 62'; Holland 65'	Report		Stadium: Prenton Park; Attendance: 1,608; Referee: Jane Simms

12 February 2023 12	Liverpool	0–1	Leicester City	Birkenhead
14:00	Lawley (yellow card) 83'	Report	Cain 8'; Tierney (yellow card) 72'; Mace (yellow card) 83'; Bott (yellow card) 90+2'	Stadium: Prenton Park; Attendance: 1,818; Referee: Richie Watkins
Note: Rescheduled from 11 December 2022.

8 March 2023 13	Arsenal	2–0	Liverpool	Borehamwood
19:15	Blackstenius 28'; Foord 34'; Giovana (yellow card) 81'	Report	Holland (yellow card) 33'; Lundgaard (yellow card) 90'	Stadium: Meadow Park; Attendance: 3,554; Referee: Emily Heaslip
Note: Rescheduled from 5 March due to Arsenal's participation in the 2023 FA Women's League Cup Final.

12 March 2023 14	Liverpool	2–1	Tottenham Hotspur	Birkenhead
14:00	Koivisto 21'; Bo Kearns 35'; Holland (yellow card) 54'; Laws (yellow card) 90+9'	Report	Ayane 17'; Turner (yellow card) 31'	Stadium: Prenton Park; Attendance: 1,971; Referee: Jane Simms

24 March 2023 15	Everton	1–1	Liverpool	Liverpool
19:30	George 27', (yellow card) 54'	Report	Stengel 40'; Bo Kearns (yellow card) 47'; Hinds (yellow card) 90+4'	Stadium: Goodison Park; Attendance: 22,161; Referee: Lauren Impey

2 April 2023 16	West Ham United	0–0	Liverpool	Dagenham
17:00		Report	Holland (yellow card) 35'; van de Sanden (yellow card) 90+1'	Stadium: Victoria Road; Attendance: 2,014; Referee: Jane Simms

23 April 2023 17	Liverpool	2–1	Brighton & Hove Albion	Birkenhead
14:00	Holland 54', 70'; Lawley (yellow card) 74'	Report	Terland 39'; Green (yellow card) 90+3'	Stadium: Prenton Park; Attendance: 1,888; Referee: Lisa Benn

29 April 2023 18	Leicester City	4–0	Liverpool	Leicester
12:30	Green 15'; Jones 21', (yellow card) 40'; Plumptre 48'; Goodwin 90+6'	Report		Stadium: King Power Stadium; Attendance: 4,162; Referee: Emily Heaslip

3 May 2023 19	Chelsea	2–1	Liverpool	Kingston upon Thames
19:15	Charles 41'; Kerr 86'	Report	Koivisto 2', (yellow card) 34'; Kirby (yellow card) 85'	Stadium: Kingsmeadow; Attendance: 1,664; Referee: Abigail Byrne
Note: Rescheduled from 22 January 2023.

7 May 2023 20	Liverpool	2–1	Manchester City	Birkenhead
14:00	Dowie 16'; Holland (yellow card) 45+3'; Bo Kearns 47'	Report	Hemp 28'; Roebuck (yellow card) 74'; Kelly (yellow card) 90+1'	Stadium: Prenton Park; Attendance: 2,552; Referee: Jane Simms

21 May 2023 21	Aston Villa	3–3	Liverpool	Aston
14:00	Hanson 7', 70'; Daly 45+1'; Staniforth (yellow card) 85'	Report	Stengel 37', 62'; Dowie 40'	Stadium: Villa Park; Attendance: 7,578; Referee: Kirsty Dowle

27 May 2023 22	Liverpool	0–1	Manchester United	Birkenhead
14:30	Holland (yellow card) 55'	Report	Toone (yellow card) 13'; García 72'	Stadium: Prenton Park; Attendance: 5,778; Referee: Stacey Fullicks

=== League table ===
Pos	Team	Pld	W	D	L	GF	GA	GD	Pts
5	Aston Villa	22	11	4	7	47	37	+10	37
6	Everton	22	9	3	10	29	36	−7	30
7	Liverpool	22	6	5	11	24	39	−15	23
8	West Ham United	22	6	3	13	23	44	−21	21
9	Tottenham Hotspur	22	5	3	14	31	47	−16	18

Source: Women's Super League
Rules for classification: 1) Points; 2) Goal difference; 3) Number of goals scored.

== Women's FA Cup ==
As a member of the first tier, Liverpool entered the FA Cup in the fourth round proper.

29 January 2023 Fourth round	Chelsea	3–2	Liverpool	Kingston upon Thames
13:00	Kerr 32', 52', 79'	Report	Holland 62'; Bonner 85'	Stadium: Kingsmeadow

== FA Women's League Cup ==
=== Group stage ===
2 October 2022 Group stage	Sunderland	0–1	Liverpool	Hetton-le-Hole
11:30		Report	Campbell 23'	Stadium: Eppleton CW; Attendance: 590

26 October 2022 Group stage	Leicester City	0–4	Liverpool	Burton upon Trent
19:00		Report	Kearns 14'; Roberts 33'; Furness 45+2'; Stengel 72'	Stadium: Pirelli Stadium; Attendance: 354

27 November 2022 Group stage	Liverpool	1–0	Blackburn Rovers	Birkenhead
14:00	Matthews 45'	Report		Stadium: Prenton Park; Attendance: 969

7 December 2022 Group stage	Liverpool	0–2	Manchester City	Birkenhead
19:00	Silcock (yellow card) 45+2'	Report	Angeldahl 57'; Fowler 74'	Stadium: Prenton Park; Attendance: 965

Group B

Pos	Team	Pld	W	WPEN	LPEN	L	GF	GA	GD	Pts	Qualification	MCI	LIV	LEI	SUN	BLB
1	Manchester City	4	4	0	0	0	12	0	+12	12	Advanced to knock-out stage	—	–	–	3–0	6–0
2	Liverpool	4	3	0	0	1	6	2	+4	9	Possible knock-out stage based on ranking	0–2	—	–	–	1–0
3	Leicester City	4	2	0	0	2	8	5	+3	6		–	0–4	—	–	–
4	Sunderland	3	0	0	0	3	0	9	−9	0		—	0–1	0–5	—	–
5	Blackburn Rovers	3	0	0	0	3	0	10	−10	0		–	–	0–3	C–C	—

Rules for classification: 1) Points; 2) Goal difference; 3) Number of goals scored; 4) Number of wins; 5) Head-to-head record

Ranking of second-placed teams

Pos	Grp	Team	Pld	W	WPEN	LPEN	L	GF	GA	GD	Pts	PPG	Qualification
1	B	Liverpool	4	3	0	0	1	6	2	+4	9	2.25	Advanced to knock-out stage
2	A	Manchester United	4	2	0	2	0	11	5	+6	8	2.00	
3	E	Reading	3	2	0	0	1	8	2	+6	6	2.00	
4	C	Brighton & Hove Albion	3	2	0	0	1	6	2	+4	6	2.00	
5	D	Lewes	3	2	0	0	1	6	2	+4	6	2.00	

=== Knockout stage ===
25 January 2023 Quarter-final	Liverpool	0–1	West Ham United	Birkenhead
19:30	Daniëls (yellow card) 72'; Campbell (yellow card) 90+7'	Report	Hayashi (yellow card) 75'; Brynjarsdóttir 87'	Stadium: Prenton Park; Attendance: 510; Referee: Martin Woods

== Squad statistics ==
=== Appearances ===
As of 27 May 2023

Starting appearances are listed first, followed by substitute appearances after the + symbol where applicable.

No.	Pos	Nat	Player	Total		WSL		FA Cup		League Cup	
No.	Pos	Nat	Player	Apps	Goals	Apps	Goals	Apps	Goals	Apps	Goals
1	GK	(England) ENG	Rachael Laws	18	0	17	0	1	0	0	0
2	DF	(Finland) FIN	Emma Koivisto	27	2	21	2	1	0	3+2	0
3	DF	(England) ENG	Leighanne Robe	17	0	6+5	0	0+1	0	4+1	0
4	MF	(Wales) WAL	Rhiannon Roberts	22	2	3+16	1	0	0	3	1
5	DF	(Republic of Ireland) IRL	Niamh Fahey	16	0	12	0	1	0	2+1	0
6	DF	(England) ENG	Jasmine Matthews	25	1	18+2	0	1	0	3+1	1
7	MF	(England) ENG	Missy Bo Kearns	28	5	17+5	4	1	0	4+1	1
8	MF	(Japan) JPN	Fuka Nagano	13	0	11	0	1	0	1	0
9	FW	(Republic of Ireland) IRL	Leanne Kiernan	2	0	1+1	0	0	0	0	0
11	FW	(England) ENG	Melissa Lawley	18	0	12+1	0	1	0	3+1	0
12	DF	(England) ENG	Taylor Hinds	28	0	22	0	0+1	0	1+4	0
13	GK	(Canada) CAN	Rylee Foster	0	0	0	0	0	0	0	0
15	MF	(Denmark) DEN	Sofie Lundgaard	14	0	0+12	0	0+1	0	0+1	0
17	MF	(England) ENG	Carla Humphrey	12	0	1+7	0	0	0	4	0
18	MF	(Wales) WAL	Ceri Holland	25	5	17+2	4	1	1	1+4	0
19	FW	(Netherlands) NED	Shanice van de Sanden	15	1	7+7	1	0	0	0+1	0
20	FW	(Belgium) BEL	Yana Daniëls	22	0	8+9	0	1	0	4	0
21	GK	(Scotland) SCO	Eartha Cumings	5	0	2	0	0	0	3	0
22	GK	(England) ENG	Faye Kirby	5	0	3	0	0	0	2	0
23	DF	(England) ENG	Gemma Bonner	14	1	10+2	0	0+1	1	1	0
24	FW	(United States) USA	Katie Stengel	27	10	20+1	9	1	0	2+3	1
28	DF	(Republic of Ireland) IRL	Megan Campbell	22	1	12+4	0	1	0	4+1	1
29	FW	(England) ENG	Natasha Dowie	7	2	5+2	2	0	0	0	0
34	MF	(England) ENG	Hannah Silcock	5	0	1	0	0	0	4	0
35	MF	(England) ENG	Miri Taylor	9	0	3+6	0	0	0	0	0
Players who appeared for the club but left during the season:
8	DF	(England) ENG	Charlotte Wardlaw	8	0	1+3	0	0	0	3+1	0
10	MF	(Northern Ireland) NIR	Rachel Furness	13	2	4+5	1	0	0	3+1	1
25	DF	(England) ENG	Gilly Flaherty	10	0	8	0	0	0	0+2	0

== Transfers ==
=== Transfers in ===
Date	Position	Nationality	Name	From	Ref.
6 July 2022	DF	(Finland)	Emma Koivisto	(England) Brighton & Hove Albion	
11 July 2022	DF	(England)	Gilly Flaherty	(England) West Ham United	
14 July 2022	GK	(Scotland)	Eartha Cumings	(England) Charlton Athletic	
16 July 2022	FW	(Netherlands)	Shanice van de Sanden	(Germany) Wolfsburg	
15 September 2022	GK	(England)	Faye Kirby	(England) Everton	
24 December 2022	DF	(England)	Gemma Bonner	(United States) Racing Louisville	
10 January 2023	MF	(Denmark)	Sofie Lundgaard	(Denmark) Fortuna Hjørring	
14 January 2023	MF	(Japan)	Fuka Nagano	(United States) North Carolina Courage	
19 January 2023	MF	(England)	Miri Taylor	(United States) Angel City FC	

=== Loans in ===
Date	Position	Nationality	Name	From	Until	Ref.
8 September 2022	DF	(England)	Charlotte Wardlaw	(England) Chelsea	3 January 2023	
31 January 2023	FW	(England)	Natasha Dowie	(England) Reading	End of season	

=== Transfers out ===
Date	Position	Nationality	Name	To	Ref.
10 May 2022	MF	(Jamaica)	Jade Bailey	(England) London City Lionesses	
10 May 2022	DF	(New Zealand)	Meikayla Moore	(Scotland) Glasgow City	
10 May 2022	FW	(England)	Rianna Dean	(England) Crystal Palace	
12 January 2023	DF	(England)	Gilly Flaherty	Retired	
3 February 2023	MF	(Northern Ireland)	Rachel Furness	(England) Bristol City	

=== Loans out ===
Date	Position	Nationality	Name	To	Until	Ref.
25 July 2022	GK	(England)	Charlotte Clarke	(England) West Bromwich Albion	End of season	
28 July 2022	FW	(England)	Ashley Hodson	(England) Birmingham City	End of season	
1 August 2022	DF	(England)	Lucy Parry	(Scotland) Hibernian	End of season	
