= Missy Bo Kearns =

English footballer (born 2001)

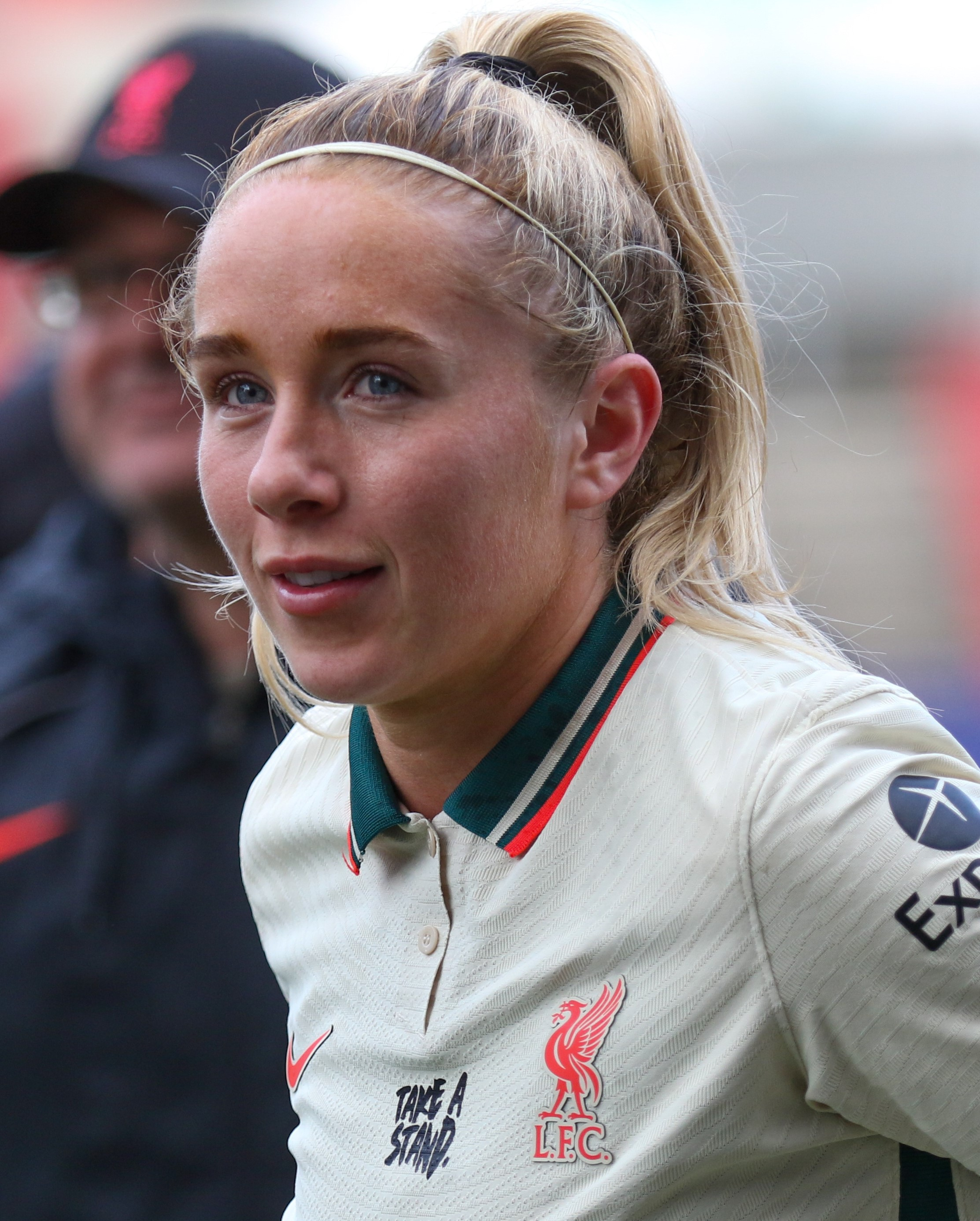
- Kearns with Liverpool in 2022

Personal information
- Date of birth: 14 April 2001 (age 25)
- Place of birth: Liverpool, England
- Height: 1.65 m (5 ft 5 in)
- Position: Central midfielder

Team information
- Current team: Aston Villa
- Number: 7

Youth career
- Liverpool

Senior career*
Years	Team	Apps	(Gls)
2018–2024	Liverpool	79	(11)
2019–2020	→ Blackburn Rovers (loan)	3	(0)
2024–	Aston Villa	28	(0)

International career^{‡}
2018	England U17	10	(1)
2019–2021	England U19	6	(1)
2021–2024	England U23	24	(5)
2025–	England	3	(0)
- * Club domestic league appearances and goals as of 20:09, 8 November 2026 (UTC) ‡ National team caps and goals as of 09:40, 2 December 2025 (UTC)

Missy Bo Kearns (born 14 April 2001) is an English professional footballer who plays as a central midfielder for Women's Super League club Aston Villa and the England national team. With Liverpool, she was a Championship winner and has twice been awarded Women's Player of the Season. Kearns previously represented England at under-17, under-19 and under-23 levels.

== Early life ==
Kearns was born on 14 April 2001 in Liverpool, England. She grew up supporting Liverpool and regularly attended their matchday. Kearns joined Liverpool's youth academy when she was eight years old after being scouted as the only girl playing in the local grassroots team Mossley Hill, alongside future Liverpool player Curtis Jones.

== Club career ==
Kearns made her first team debut for Liverpool in March 2019 against Chelsea. She signed her first professional contract with the club in January 2020 and joined Blackburn Rovers on loan until the end of the 2019–20 season, making a total of three appearances for the club.

Kearns saw a significant increase game time during the 2020–21 season and established herself as a first team regular for Liverpool towards the second half of the season. On 17 January 2021, she scored her first senior goal for the club in a 2–1 league loss against Leicester City. At the end of the 2020–21 season, Kearns won the Standard Chartered Women's Player of the Season and was voted the fans' player of the year.

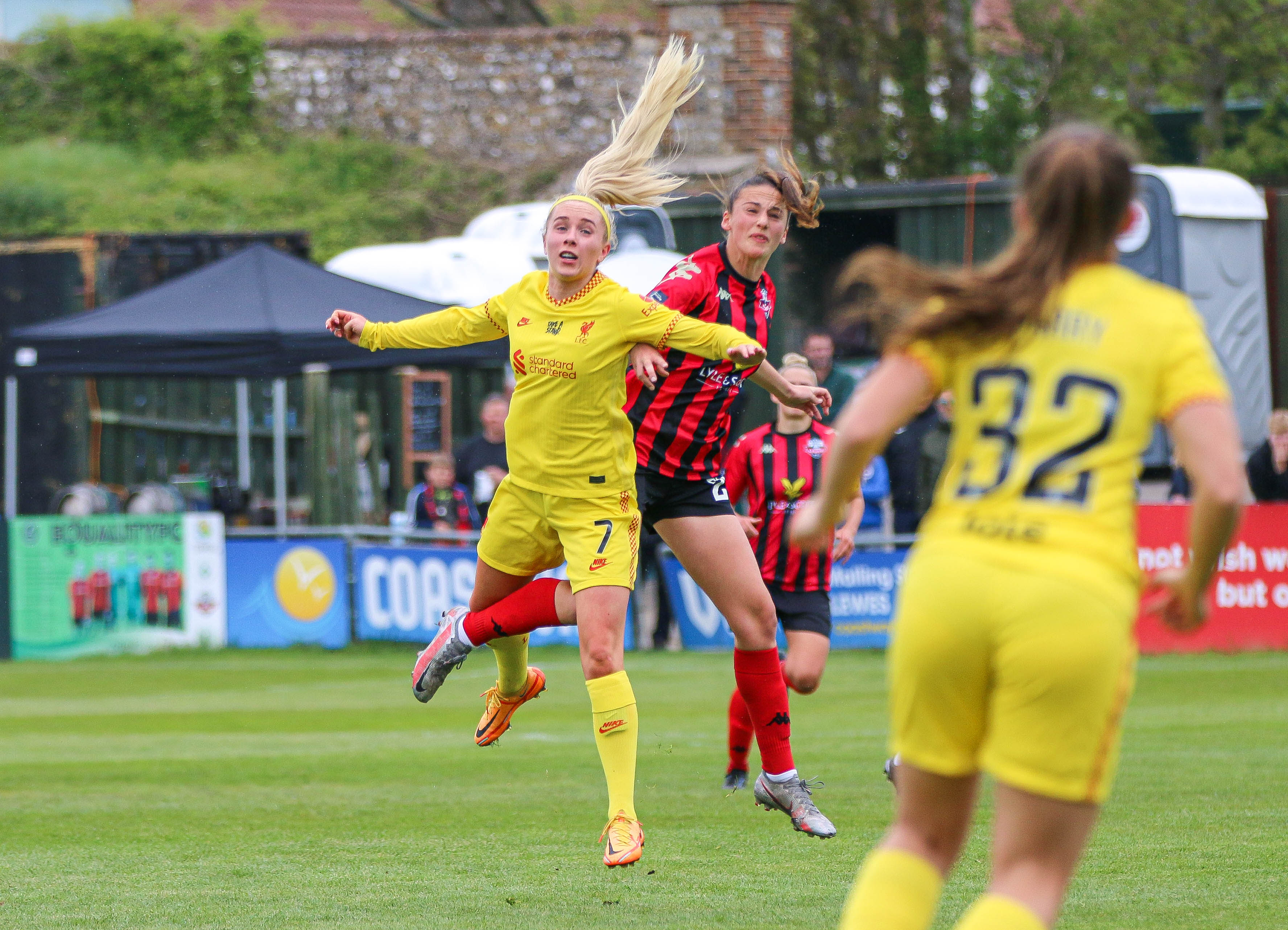
Kearns (left) playing for Liverpool against Lewes, 1 May 2022.

On 13 October 2021, at the age of 20, she became the youngest player to ever captain the side in a 2021–22 League Cup match against Aston Villa. She would go on to captain the side again in the competition against Blackburn Rovers a month later in a 2–1 victory.

In May 2023, Kearns won the Women's Football Awards Young Player of the Year award, being recognised as one of the WSL's brightest young talents alongside Lauren James. In June, she again won the LFC Women's Player of the Season award for the 2022–23 season.

In August 2023, she signed a contract extension with Liverpool, and was nominated for the PFA Women's Young Player of the Year Award. In November 2023, she was named Women’s Rising Star at the Northwest Football Awards.

In May 2024, Kearns was awarded The PFA Community Champions Award alongside outgoing men's manager Jürgen Klopp and men's first team captain Virgil Van Dijk for their work in the community.

On 1 August 2024, Kearns departed from Liverpool and signed a three-year contract with fellow Women's Super League club Aston Villa.

== International career ==
=== Youth ===
Kearns has captained the England under-23s and represented the U17s and U19s.

On 16 March 2018, Kearns was named as part of the England under-17s squad for 2018 U-17 Championship qualification. She made her youth international debut on 25 March 2018, coming on as a substitute against Slovenia in a 0–0 draw. Her debut goal came three days later against Switzerland in a 4–0 win. In May 2018, Kearns was named as part of the squad for the final tournament, where she was forced off injured during the knock-out stage.

On 30 September 2019, Kearns was named in the England under-19s squad for the 2020 U-19 Championship first qualifying round. She played in each match as England reached the elite qualifying round, after winning all their first round qualification matches. The final tournament was subsequently cancelled due to the COVID-19 pandemic. On 6 March 2020, Kearns scored her first goal for the U19 team, an equaliser as a second-half substitute against Sweden in La Manga Tournament.

On 12 October 2021, Kearns was named as part of the England under-23s squad for a fixture against Belgium, playing as a substitute in the match. On 30 November, as part of the starting eleven with the under-23s, she scored a hat-trick in an 11–0 win over Estonia.

From February to October 2022, Kearns played in U23 fixtures against France, Netherlands, Norway and Sweden, as well as scoring goals against France and Norway.

It's a massive thing captaining your country and I'm fortunate enough to be given the opportunity. We've got a good group of girls and I think it's a good thing for me at this stage in my career to have that bit of extra responsibility and to be a character in and around the team.

— Missy Bo Kearns, November 2023

On 20 February 2023 she scored the opening goal in a 4–0 victory over Belgium and a winning goal in injury time against Portugal in a 3–2 win. In September 2023, Kearns was named as part of the U23 squad for fixtures in a new U23 European League, where she would go on to captain the team in a 1–1 draw against Norway and a 4–0 win against Belgium. For the remainder of 2023, she continued to captain the team in U23 European League fixtures against Italy, Portugal, France and Spain, with the team ending 2023 unbeaten.

=== Senior ===
In May 2024, Kearns was named in the stand-by squad for the England senior team for their UEFA Euro 2025 qualifying fixtures in summer 2024. In October, she was selected for the England under-23 team for European fixtures against Netherlands and Portugal. Kearns made her senior debut on 3 June 2025, coming on as a half-time substitute during England's UEFA Nations League match against Spain. Two days after her debut, she was named as a standby player for UEFA Euro 2025.

== Personal life ==
Kearns has been a Liverpool fan for a long time and cited their former player Steven Gerrard as an inspiration. She also enjoys watching Uruguayan footballer Luis Suarez.

On 27 January 2024, Kearns became an ambassador for the LFC Foundation, the official charity of Liverpool F.C.

Kearns announced news of her pregnancy with partner Liam Walsh by Instagram post on 1 March 2026. On 29 March 2026, Kearns revealed that she had unfortunately suffered a miscarriage, which led to her contracting sepsis and being hospitalised for four days. Kearns later credited the Aston Villa medical staff with saving her life, after urging her to go to the hospital after falling ill while at the club's training ground.

== Career statistics ==
=== Club ===
As of match played 11 November 2026

Appearances and goals by club, season and competition
Club	Season	League			National cup (Note: Includes Women's FA Cup)		League cup (Note: Includes FA Women's League Cup)		Total	
Club	Season	Division	Apps	Goals	Apps	Goals	Apps	Goals	Apps	Goals
Liverpool	2018–19	Women's Super League	3	0	0	0	0	0	3	0
Liverpool	2019–20	Women's Super League	0	0	0	0	3	1	3	1
Liverpool	2020–21	Championship	15	2	1	0	3	0	19	2
Liverpool	2021–22	Championship	19	4	2	0	5	0	26	4
Liverpool	2022–23	Women's Super League	22	4	1	0	5	1	28	5
Liverpool	2023–24	Women's Super League	20	1	2	0	2	0	24	0
Liverpool	Total		79	11	6	0	18	2	103	12
Blackburn Rovers (loan)	2019–20	Championship	3	0	0	0	0	0	3	0
Aston Villa	2024–25	Women's Super League	15	0	2	0	2	0	19	0
Aston Villa	2025–26	Women's Super League	11	0	1	0	3	0	15	0
Aston Villa	2026–27	Women's Super League	2	0	0	0	2	1	4	1
Aston Villa	Total		28	0	3	0	7	1	39	1
Career total			111	11	9	0	25	3	145	13

=== International ===
As of match played 2 December 2025

Appearances and goals by national team and year
National team	Year	Apps	Goals
England	2025	3	0
Total		3	0

== Honours ==
Liverpool

- FA Women's Championship: 2021–22

Individual

- Liverpool F.C. Women's Player of the Season: 2020–2021, 2022–2023
- Women's Football Awards Young Player of the Year: 2023
- Northwest Football Award Women's Rising Star: 2023
