= Gemma Bonner =

English footballer (born 1991)

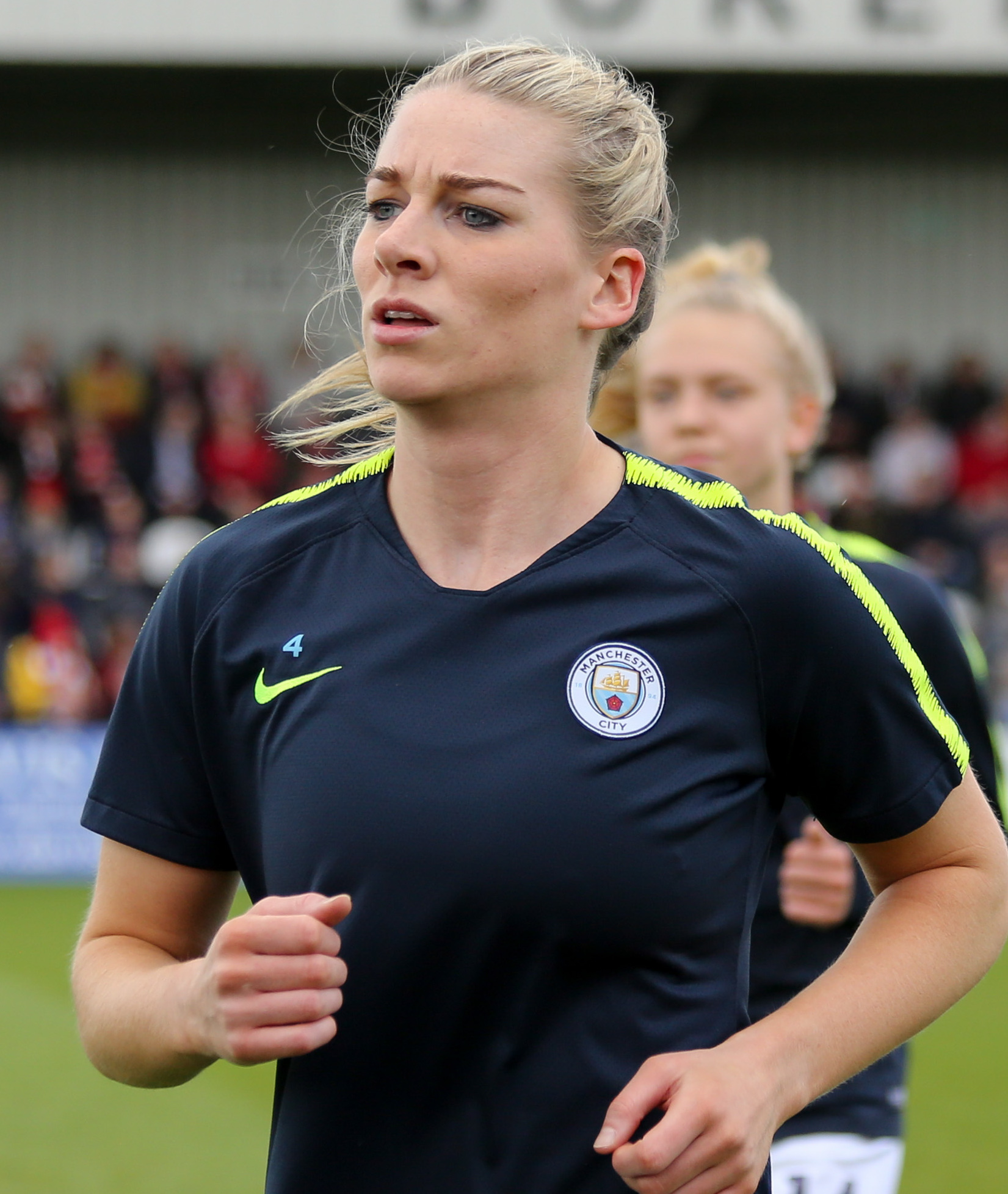
- Bonner with Manchester City in 2019

Personal information
- Full name: Gemma Bonner
- Date of birth: 13 July 1991 (age 35)
- Place of birth: Leeds, England
- Height: 1.75 m (5 ft 9 in)
- Position: Centre-back

Team information
- Current team: Denver Summit
- Number: 13

Youth career
- Leeds United

Senior career*
| Years | Team | Apps | (Gls) |
| 2007–2011 | Leeds United | 59 | (1) |
| 2011–2012 | Chelsea | 28 | (2) |
| 2012–2018 | Liverpool | 79 | (8) |
| 2018–2021 | Manchester City | 39 | (5) |
| 2021–2022 | Racing Louisville | 33 | (1) |
| 2023–2026 | Liverpool | 61 | (2) |
| 2026– | Denver Summit | 0 | (0) |

International career^{‡}
| 2008 | England U17 | 5 | (0) |
| 2009–2010 | England U19 | 13 | (1) |
| 2010–2013 | England U23 | 10 | (2) |
| 2013–2019 | England | 12 | (1) |
- * Club domestic league appearances and goals as of 17:06, 16 May 2026 (UTC) ‡ National team caps and goals as of 15:31, 20 December 2023 (UTC)

Gemma Bonner (born 13 July 1991) is an English professional footballer who plays as a centre-back for Denver Summit FC of the National Women's Soccer League (NWSL).

Bonner began her career with her hometown club Leeds United, before spending two seasons with Chelsea. In November 2012, Bonner signed for Liverpool and captained them to two FA WSL titles in 2013 and 2014, before leaving for Manchester City in 2018. She left England to join NWSL club Racing Louisville in 2021, before rejoining Liverpool in the 2022–23 season where she is now the club's record appearance holder.

Bonner has previously represented the England national team. She made her senior debut in September 2013. She was part of England's squad for the UEFA Women's Euro 2013 but did not play in the final tournament.

== Club career ==
=== Leeds United ===
Bonner started playing football as soon as she could run, and by the age of eight had already joined Leeds United. While at Leeds, the defender won the League Cup in 2010, and was in the runner-up team of the FA Cup in 2008.

=== Chelsea ===
Her versatility with both feet and strong aerial ability were the main attributes that brought Chelsea calling in January 2011, when the Blues secured her signature ahead of the Women's Super League.

She played in the first ever FA Cup Final of Chelsea, in 2012. The young defender scored her only goal of the 2011–12 FA Women's Cup in their 2–0 away win against The Belles in the 6th round, helping her side to secure their place in the semi-finals. In the penalty shoot-out of the 2012 FA Women's Cup Final, she was unable to convert her penalty into a goal. She blazed hers over the bar to hand the Cup to Birmingham.

Bonner scored her first league goal for Chelsea in the very next game after the 2012 FA Women's Cup Final, against their cup final opponents Birmingham.

=== Liverpool ===
In November 2012 Bonner signed for Liverpool. In doing so she linked up with her ex-Chelsea manager Matt Beard and expressed her excitement at the move: "I am delighted to be joining Liverpool at a key time in my football career and have been greatly influenced by the commitment that Liverpool FC are showing towards women's football. When the opportunity to work with Matt again came I was pleased to take it and I am excited for the challenge ahead."

With Bonner as captain Liverpool won the league title in 2013 and 2014 but were much less successful in 2015, finishing second bottom. She extended her contract with the club in November 2015.

=== Manchester City ===
Bonner left Liverpool in June 2018 after six years and a total of 115 appearances, to join Manchester City Women. She scored 11 goals in 69 matches with City, though her last season there was cut short by ankle and muscle injuries.

=== Racing Louisville ===
In April 2021, National Women's Soccer League team Racing Louisville FC announced signing Bonner to a two-year contract with an option for a third year. She arrived in June and started 13 matches for the expansion club through the 2021 season. Bonner was named one of four captains at Racing for 2022. She has started all four of Racing's 2022 NWSL Challenge Cup matches, scoring in her team's 3–0 win at Kansas City.

=== Liverpool ===
On 23 December 2022, Bonner signed with Liverpool again.

On 9 November 2023, Bonner became the record appearance holder at the club with her notching her 135th appearance against Manchester City in the League Cup. On 26 November, she was awarded a special framed shirt by Ian Callaghan, the record holder for the Liverpool men's team.

On 28 April 2024, in honour of her being a former two-time League Title winning captain and record appearance holder, Bonner was honoured by the men's Academy at Kirkby by having a dressing room named after her. The idea came from Academy Director, Alex Inglethorpe and was installed by Head of Facilities, Andy Rice. Bonner becomes the first female player to receive such an honour, joining the likes of Steven Gerrard and Robbie Fowler.

On 4 August 2025, it was announced that Bonner had signed a new contract to extend her time with the club. On 15 May 2026, it was announced that she would depart the club at the end of the 2025–26 season, holding the club's record for appearances in the WSL at 186.

=== Denver Summit ===
In August 2026, Bonner returned to the NWSL, signing a contract with Denver Summit FC through the end of the season.

== International career ==
An England representative at Under 17s, Under 19s, Under 20s and Under 23s level by the age of 19, Bonner has accumulated a wealth of international experience. She was in the England Under 17s World Cup team, in which they ended in the fourth place. In 2009 Bonner was part of the England Under 19s European Championship winning side. Bonner received her first senior team call-up for the UEFA Euro 2013 qualifier away to Croatia in March 2012.

Bonner made her first senior appearance in September 2013, under interim coach Brent Hills, in an 8–0 World Cup qualifying win over Turkey at Fratton Park. She was recalled to the team by incoming coach Phil Neville in January 2018, but an ankle ligament injury ruled her out of the 2018 SheBelieves Cup in March.

In February 2019 Bonner was added to the England squad for the SheBelieves Cup following an injury to Millie Bright.

Bonner has England legacy number 182. The FA announced their legacy numbers scheme to honour the 50th anniversary of England's inaugural international.

== Career statistics ==
=== Club ===
As of match played 16 May 2026

Appearances and goals by club, season and competition
| Club | Season | League | | | National cup (Note: Includes Women's FA Cup) | | League cup (Note: Includes FA Women's Premier League Cup, FA Women's League Cup, NWSL Challenge Cup) | | Continental (Note: Includes UEFA Women's Champions League) | | Total | |
| Club | Season | Division | Apps | Goals | Apps | Goals | Apps | Goals | Apps | Goals | Apps | Goals |
|---|---|---|---|---|---|---|---|---|---|---|---|---|
| Leeds United | 2007–08 | Women's Premier League | 19 | 0 | ? | ? | 1 | 0 | — | | 20 | 0 |
| Leeds United | 2008–09 | Women's Premier League | 11 | 0 | ? | ? | 2 | 0 | — | | 13 | 0 |
| Leeds United | 2009–10 | Women's Premier League | 19 | 0 | ? | ? | 4 | 0 | — | | 23 | 0 |
| Leeds United | 2010–11 | Women's Premier League | 10 | 1 | ? | ? | 1 | 1 | — | | 11 | 2 |
| Leeds United | Total | | 59 | 1 | ? | ? | 8 | 1 | 0 | 0 | 67 | 2 |
| Chelsea | 2011 | Women's Super League | 14 | 0 | ? | ? | 0 | 0 | — | | 14 | 0 |
| Chelsea | 2012 | Women's Super League | 14 | 2 | ? | ? | 3 | 0 | — | | 17 | 2 |
| Chelsea | Total | | 28 | 2 | ? | ? | 3 | 0 | 0 | 0 | 31 | 2 |
| Liverpool | 2013 | Women's Super League | 13 | 3 | ? | ? | 4 | 0 | — | | 17 | 3 |
| Liverpool | 2014 | Women's Super League | 14 | 1 | ? | ? | 5 | 1 | 2 | 0 | 21 | 2 |
| Liverpool | 2015 | Women's Super League | 14 | 0 | ? | ? | 6 | 0 | 1 | 0 | 21 | 0 |
| Liverpool | 2016 | Women's Super League | 16 | 0 | ? | ? | 2 | 0 | — | | 18 | 0 |
| Liverpool | 2017 | Women's Super League | 8 | 3 | 3 | 0 | — | | — | | 11 | 3 |
| Liverpool | 2017–18 | Women's Super League | 14 | 1 | 0 | 0 | 5 | 0 | — | | 19 | 1 |
| Liverpool | Total | | 79 | 8 | 3 | 0 | 22 | 1 | 3 | 0 | 107 | 9 |
| Manchester City | 2018–19 | Women's Super League | 17 | 1 | 4 | 1 | 8 | 1 | 2 | 1 | 31 | 4 |
| Manchester City | 2019–20 | Women's Super League | 16 | 3 | 1 | 0 | 6 | 3 | 3 | 0 | 26 | 6 |
| Manchester City | 2020–21 | Women's Super League | 6 | 1 | 1 | 0 | 2 | 0 | 1 | 0 | 10 | 1 |
| Manchester City | Total | | 39 | 5 | 6 | 1 | 16 | 4 | 6 | 1 | 67 | 11 |
| Racing Louisville | 2021 | NWSL | 13 | 0 | — | | 0 | 0 | — | | 13 | 0 |
| Racing Louisville | 2022 | NWSL | 20 | 1 | — | | 6 | 1 | — | | 26 | 2 |
| Racing Louisville | Total | | 33 | 1 | 0 | 0 | 6 | 1 | 0 | 0 | 39 | 2 |
| Liverpool | 2022–23 | Women's Super League | 12 | 0 | 1 | 1 | 1 | 0 | — | | 14 | 1 |
| Liverpool | 2023–24 | Women's Super League | 20 | 2 | 1 | 1 | 3 | 1 | — | | 24 | 4 |
| Liverpool | 2024–25 | Women's Super League | 19 | 0 | 3 | 0 | 2 | 0 | — | | 24 | 0 |
| Liverpool | 2025–26 | Women's Super League | 10 | 0 | 1 | 1 | 0 | 0 | — | | 11 | 1 |
| Liverpool | Total | | 61 | 2 | 6 | 3 | 6 | 1 | 0 | 0 | 73 | 6 |
| Career total | | | 299 | 19 | 15 | 4 | 61 | 8 | 9 | 1 | 284 | 32 |

=== International ===
As of match played 9 April 2019

Appearances and goals by national team and year
| National team | Year | Apps | Goals |
|---|---|---|---|
| England | 2013 | 2 | 0 |
| England | 2014 | 3 | 1 |
| England | 2015 | 3 | 0 |
| England | 2016 | 0 | 0 |
| England | 2017 | 2 | 0 |
| England | 2018 | 0 | 0 |
| England | 2019 | 2 | 0 |
| Total | | 12 | 1 |

Scores and results list England's goal tally first, score column indicates score after each Bonner goal.

List of international goals scored by Gemma Bonner
| No. | Date | Venue | Opponent | Score | Result | Competition |
|---|---|---|---|---|---|---|
| 1 | 7 March 2014 | GSZ Stadium, Larnaca, Cyprus | Finland | 2–0 | 3–0 | 2014 Cyprus Cup |

== Honours ==
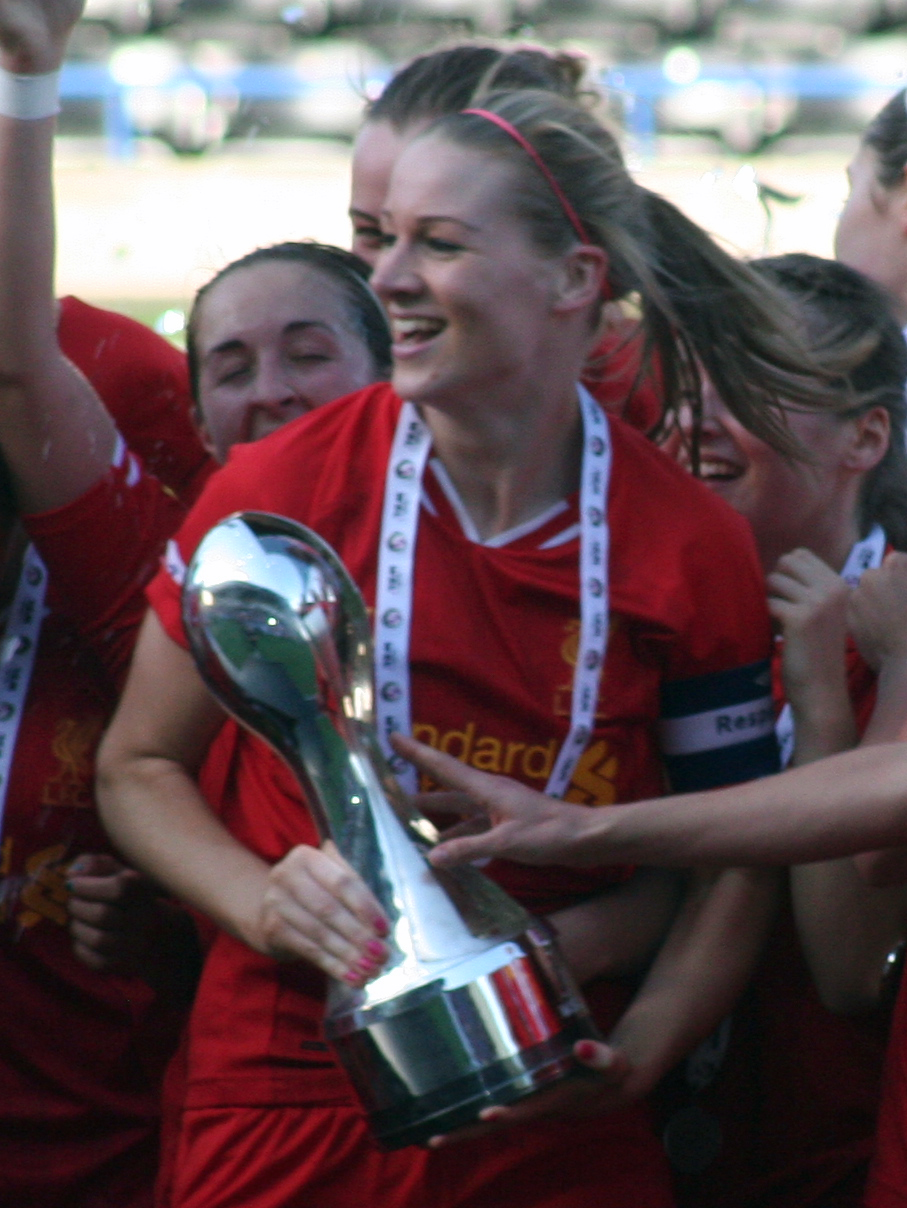
Bonner with Liverpool after winning the 2013 FA WSL, September 2013

Leeds United

- FA Women's Premier League Cup (1): 2010;

Liverpool

- WSL Women's Super League (2): 2013; 2014

Manchester City

- Women's FA Cup: 2019–20

England

- SheBelieves Cup: 2019

England U19

- UEFA Women's Under-19 Championship

Winners (1): 2009
Runners-up (1): 2010

Individual

- Liverpool Women's Fans Player of the Year: 2018
