= 2023–24 Liverpool F.C. Women season =

35th season in existence of Liverpool FC Women

Liverpool
2023–24 season
- Owner: Fenway Sports Group
- Chairman: Tom Werner
- Head coach: Matt Beard
- Stadium: Prenton Park
- WSL: 4th
- FA Cup: Quarter-finals
- League Cup: Group stage
- Top goalscorer: League: Sophie Román Haug (7); All: Sophie Román Haug (9)
- Highest home attendance: 23,088 (vs. Everton, 15 October 2023)
- Lowest home attendance: League: 1,341 (vs. Bristol City, 10 December 2023); All: 1,045 (vs. Manchester City, 8 November 2023, League Cup)
- Average home league attendance: 4,550
- Biggest win: 4–0 (vs. Brighton & Hove Albion (H), 26 November 2023); 4–0 (vs. Leicester City (A), 18 May 2024)
- Biggest defeat: 1–5 (vs. Chelsea (A), 18 November 2023); 1–5 (vs. Manchester City (A), 21 January 2024)
Home colours	Away colours	Third colours

The 2023–24 Liverpool F.C. Women season is the club's 35th season of competitive football and second consecutive season back in the Women's Super League, the highest level of the football pyramid. Along with competing in the WSL, the club also contested two domestic cup competitions: the FA Cup and the League Cup.

On 3 May 2024, Liverpool confirmed that this season would be their last playing at Prenton Park, with the team playing their home games at the Totally Wicked Stadium from the 2024–25 season onwards.

== First Team Squad ==
As of 1 February 2024

Note: Flags indicate national team as defined under FIFA eligibility rules; some limited exceptions apply. Players may hold more than one non-FIFA nationality.

No.	Pos.	Nation	Player
1	GK	ENG	Rachael Laws
2	DF	FIN	Emma Koivisto
4	DF	ENG	Grace Fisk
5	DF	IRL	Niamh Fahey (captain)
6	DF	ENG	Jasmine Matthews
7	MF	ENG	Missy Bo Kearns
8	MF	JPN	Fūka Nagano
9	FW	IRL	Leanne Kiernan
10	FW	NOR	Sophie Román Haug
11	FW	ENG	Melissa Lawley
12	DF	ENG	Taylor Hinds

No.	Pos.	Nation	Player
13	FW	ENG	Mia Enderby
14	MF	AUT	Marie Höbinger
15	MF	DEN	Sofie Lundgaard
16	GK	AUS	Teagan Micah
17	DF	SCO	Jenna Clark
18	MF	WAL	Ceri Holland
19	FW	NED	Shanice van de Sanden
20	FW	BEL	Yana Daniëls
22	GK	ENG	Faye Kirby
23	DF	ENG	Gemma Bonner
32	DF	ENG	Lucy Parry

== Pre-season and friendlies ==
On 20 August, Liverpool's pre-season began with a 1–0 defeat against Championship side Birmingham City at St Andrew's. The team participated in the sixth edition of the invitational friendly Women's French Cup, losing on penalties following a 1–1 draw with Paris Saint-Germain in the semi-finals before a 1–0 defeat in third place play-off against Atlético Madrid.

Win Draw Loss Fixtures

20 August 2023 Friendly	Birmingham City (England)	1–0	(England) Liverpool	Birmingham
15:00	Agg 89'	Report		Stadium: St Andrew's

28 August 2023 French Cup semi-final	Liverpool (England)	1–1 (1–2 p)	(France) Paris Saint-Germain	Colomiers, France
20:00	Flint 57'	Report	Le Guilly 21'	Stadium: Stade Michel Bendichou

31 August 2023 French Cup third-place play-off	Atlético Madrid (Spain)	2–1	(England) Liverpool	Colomiers, France
17:00	Moraza 32'; Cardona 51'	Report	Kearns 42' (pen.)	Stadium: Stade Michel Bendichou

9 September 2023 Friendly	Manchester City (England)	1–0	(England) Liverpool	Manchester
	Coombs 75'	Report		Stadium: Academy Stadium

13 September 2023 Friendly	Manchester United (England)	3–1	(England) Liverpool	Carrington
	Toone 10', 14'; Geyse 68'	Report	Flint 42'	Stadium: Trafford Training Centre; Attendance: Behind-closed-doors

17 September 2023 Friendly	Leicester City (England)	1–3	(England) Liverpool	Leicester
13:00	Whelan (pen.)	Report	Holland 12'; Flint 54'; Kearns 84'	Stadium: Belvoir Drive Training Complex; Attendance: Behind-closed-doors

== Women's Super League ==
=== League table ===
Pos	Team	Pld	W	D	L	GF	GA	GD	Pts	Qualification or relegation
2	Manchester City	22	18	1	3	61	15	+46	55	Qualification for the Champions League second round
3	Arsenal	22	16	2	4	53	20	+33	50	Qualification for the Champions League first round
4	Liverpool	22	12	5	5	36	28	+8	41	
5	Manchester United	22	10	5	7	42	32	+10	35	
6	Tottenham Hotspur	22	8	7	7	31	36	−5	31	

Source: Women's Super League Table
Rules for classification: 1) Points; 2) Goal difference; 3) Number of goals scored.

==== Results summary ====
Overall								Home						Away					
Pld	W	D	L	GF	GA	GD	Pts	W	D	L	GF	GA	GD	W	D	L	GF	GA	GD
22	12	5	5	36	28	+8	41	6	2	3	19	14	+5	6	3	2	17	14	+3

Last updated: 18 May 2024.
Source: Women’s Super League

==== Results by round ====
Round	1	2	3	4	5	6	7	8	9	10	11	12	13	14	15	16	17	18	19	20	21	22
Ground	A	H	H	A	H	A	A	H	H	A	A	H	H	A	A	H	A	H	A	H	H	A
Result	W	W	L	D	W	D	L	W	D	W	L	L	D	W	W	W	D	L	W	W	W	W
Position	6	2	5	6	4	5	6	5	5	5	5	5	5	5	5	5	4	5	5	5	4	4
Points	3	6	6	7	10	11	11	14	15	18	18	18	19	22	25	28	29	29	32	35	38	41

Updated to match(es) played on 18 May 2024. Source: Women’s Super League
A = Away; H = Home; W = Win; D = Draw; L = Loss; P = Postponed

==== Matches ====
Win Draw Loss Fixtures

1 October 2023 1	Arsenal	0–1	Liverpool	Holloway
14:00 BST	McCabe (yellow card) 45'	Report	Taylor 48'; Hinds (yellow card) 79'; Holland (yellow card) 83'; Enderby (yellow card) 87'	Stadium: Emirates Stadium; Attendance: 54,115; Referee: Emily Heaslip

8 October 2023 2	Liverpool	2–0	Aston Villa	Birkenhead
18:45 BST	Höbinger 21'; Daniëls (yellow card) 45+1'; Hinds (yellow card) 66'; Flint 77'; Lawley (yellow card) 90+4'	Report		Stadium: Prenton Park; Attendance: 2,963; Referee: Melissa Burgin

15 October 2023 3	Liverpool	0–1	Everton	Liverpool
16:30 BST	Hinds (yellow card) 77'	Report	Finnigan 31'; Payne (yellow card) 78'; Vanhaevermaet (yellow card) 88'; Brosnan (yellow card) 90+1'	Stadium: Anfield; Attendance: 23,088; Referee: Abigail Byrne

22 October 2023 4	West Ham United	1–1	Liverpool	Dagenham
15:00 BST	Ueki (yellow card) 38', (goal) 90+5'	Report	Höbinger 52'; Bonner (yellow card) 73'	Stadium: Chigwell Construction Stadium; Attendance: 1,163; Referee: Steven Hughes

5 November 2023 5	Liverpool	2–1	Leicester City	Birkenhead
14:00 GMT	Lawley 48'; Nagano (yellow card) 60'; Höbinger 84'; Van de Sanden (yellow card) 90+7'; Enderby (yellow card) 90+8'	Report	Goodwin 57'; Thibaud (yellow card) 89'	Stadium: Prenton Park; Attendance: 1,783; Referee: Phoebe Cross

12 November 2023 6	Tottenham Hotspur	1–1	Liverpool	Leyton
12:30 GMT	Bizet 27'	Report	Haug 66'; Kearns (yellow card) 89'	Stadium: Brisbane Road; Attendance: 2,155; Referee: Abigail Byrne

18 November 2023 7	Chelsea	5–1	Liverpool	Fulham
13:30 GMT	James 11', 56', 64', (yellow card) 62'; Beever-Jones 24'; Nüsken 78'	Report	Carter 13' (o.g.); Bonner (yellow card) 41'; Holland (yellow card) 90+2'	Stadium: Stamford Bridge; Attendance: 12,802; Referee: Kirsty Dowle

26 November 2023 8	Liverpool	4–0	Brighton & Hove Albion	Birkenhead
14:00 GMT	Bonner 27'; Van de Sanden 43'; Holland 63'; Lundgaard (yellow card) 90'; Haug 90+2'	Report	Carabalí (yellow card) 10'	Stadium: Prenton Park; Attendance: 1,344; Referee: Adewunmi Soneye

10 December 2023 9	Liverpool	1–1	Bristol City	Birkenhead
14:00 GMT	Hinds (yellow card) 22'; Bonner (yellow card) 46'; Fisk (yellow card) 55'; Haug 57'	Report	Harrison (yellow card) 12'; Thestrup (yellow card) 43', (goal) 50'	Stadium: Prenton Park; Attendance: 1,341; Referee: Stacey Fullicks

17 December 2023 10	Manchester United	1–2	Liverpool	Leigh
12:15 GMT	Toone 3'; Turner (yellow card) 29'	Report	Koivisto (yellow card) 8'; Turner 32' (o.g.); Hinds 68'; Bonner (yellow card) 76'	Stadium: Leigh Sports Village; Attendance: 6,303; Referee: Lauren Impey

21 January 2024 11	Manchester City	5–1	Liverpool	Manchester
14:30 GMT	Bonner 19' (o.g.); Shaw 32', 45+7', 56'; Kelly 78' (pen.)	Report	Hinds 15'; Fisk (yellow card) 48'; Micah (yellow card) 75'	Stadium: Academy Stadium; Attendance: 4,599; Referee: Kirsty Dowle

28 January 2024 12	Liverpool	0–2	Arsenal	Birkenhead
14:00 GMT	Lawley (yellow card) 19'; Daniëls (yellow card) 57'; Koivisto (yellow card) 80'; Matthews (yellow card) 90+3'	Report	Miedema 60'; Foord 69'; McCabe (yellow card) 72'	Stadium: Prenton Park; Attendance: 6,085; Referee: Rebecca Welch

4 February 2024 13	Liverpool	1–1	Tottenham Hotspur	Birkenhead
GMT	Höbinger 90+1'	Report	Thomas (yellow card) 29'; Ildhusøy 71'; Wang (yellow card) 88'; Grant (yellow card) 89'; Graham (yellow card) 90+5'; Naz (yellow card) 90+6'	Stadium: Prenton Park; Attendance: 1,979; Referee: Lauren Impey

18 February 2024 14	Brighton & Hove Albion	0–1	Liverpool	Crawley
12:00 GMT		Report	Holland 53', (yellow card) 68' (yellow-red card) 90+3'; Fisk (yellow card) 57'; Fahey (yellow card) 57'	Stadium: Broadfield Stadium; Attendance: 2,959; Referee: Amy Fearn / Emily Heaslip

3 March 2024 15	Aston Villa	1–4	Liverpool	Walsall
15:00 GMT	Mayling 37' (pen.), (yellow card) 37'	Report	Fisk 19'; Haug 29'; Bonner (yellow card) 36'; Koivisto 60', 82'	Stadium: Bescot Stadium; Attendance: 3,045; Referee: Tom Nield

17 March 2024 16	Liverpool	3–1	West Ham United	Birkenhead
12:00 GMT	Kiernan 41'; Kearns 50'; Haug 73'; Clark (yellow card) 85'; Daniëls (yellow card) 90+4'	Report	Ueki 87'	Stadium: Prenton Park; Attendance: 1,397; Referee: Emily Heaslip

24 March 2024 17	Everton	0–0	Liverpool	Liverpool
13:00 GMT		Report	Holland (yellow card) 14'	Stadium: Goodison Park; Attendance: 9,457; Referee: Kirsty Dowle

30 March 2024 18	Liverpool	1–4	Manchester City	Birkenhead
12:30 GMT	Kearns (yellow card) 72'; Holland (yellow card) 79'; Keating 84' (o.g.)	Report	Hemp 16'; Park 22'; Shaw 24', 50'	Stadium: Prenton Park; Attendance: 3,377; Referee: Phoebe Cross

20 April 2024 19	Bristol City	0–1	Liverpool	Bristol
12:30 BST	Aspin (yellow card) 25'	Report	Höbinger 13'; Kearns (yellow card) 35'; Haug (yellow card) 85'	Stadium: Ashton Gate; Attendance: 4,780; Referee: Phoebe Cross

1 May 2024 20	Liverpool	4–3	Chelsea	Birkenhead
19:00 BST	Haug 51'; Cuthbert 66' (o.g.); Kiernan 81'; Bonner (yellow card) 89', (goal) 90+2'	Report	Beever-Jones 9', 80'; Carter (yellow card) 40'; Micah 83' (o.g.)	Stadium: Prenton Park; Attendance: 2,129; Referee: Lisa Benn
Note: This match, originally scheduled for 28 April, was postponed due to Chelsea's participation in the UEFA Women's Champions League semi-finals.

5 May 2024 21	Liverpool	1–0	Manchester United	Birkenhead
14:00 BST	Clark 45+3'; Bonner (yellow card) 84'	Report	García (yellow card) 71'; Ladd (yellow card) 79'	Stadium: Prenton Park; Attendance: 4,567; Referee: Melissa Burgin

18 May 2024 22	Leicester City	0–4	Liverpool	Leicester
15:00 BST		Report	Haug 7'; Clark (yellow card) 44'; Kiernan 66', 83', 90+4'	Stadium: King Power Stadium; Attendance: 2,764; Referee: Constantine Hatzidakis

== Women's FA Cup ==
As a member of the first tier, Liverpool will enter the FA Cup in the fourth round proper.

14 January 2024 Fourth round	Bristol City	0–1	Liverpool	Bristol
13:00 GMT	Mustaki (yellow card) 36'	Report	Holland (yellow card) 39' (yellow-red card) 60'; Bonner 85'	Stadium: Ashton Gate; Attendance: 2,563; Referee: Lisa Benn

11 February 2024 Fifth round	London City Lionesses	0–2	Liverpool	Dartford
14:00 GMT		Report	Haug 6'; Lawley 67'	Stadium: Princes Park; Attendance: 1,131; Referee: Chloe Small

9 March 2024 Quarter-finals	Liverpool	0–2	Leicester City	Birkenhead
12:00 GMT		Report	Rantala 15', 63'	Stadium: Prenton Park; Attendance: 1,342; Referee: Melissa Burgin

== FA Women's League Cup ==
As a team not qualified for the UEFA Women's Champions League, Liverpool will enter the League Cup at the group stage. They were drawn into a regional group alongside three fellow WSL teams: Everton, Manchester City and Leicester City.

=== Group stage ===
Pos	Team	Pld	W	PW	PL	L	GF	GA	GD	Pts	Qualification	MCI	MUN	LEI	LIV	EVE
1	Manchester City (Q)	4	3	0	1	0	10	7	+3	10	Advanced to knock-out stage	—	2–1	2–2	–	–
2	Manchester United	4	3	0	0	1	12	3	+9	9	Possible knock-out stage based on ranking	–	—	3–1	–	7–0
3	Leicester City	4	2	1	0	1	10	7	+3	8		–	–	—	2–1	5–1
4	Liverpool	4	1	0	0	3	6	8	−2	3		3–4	0–1	–	—	–
5	Everton	4	0	0	0	4	3	16	−13	0		1–2	–	–	1–2	—

Source: FA Women's League Cup
Rules for classification: 1) Points; 2) Goal difference; 3) Number of goals scored; 4) Number of wins; 5) Head-to-head record
(Q) Qualified to the phase indicated

11 October 2023 1	Leicester City	2–1	Liverpool	Burton upon Trent
19:00 BST	Palmer 34', (yellow card) 42'; Cain 50'; Tierney (yellow card) 69'; O'Brien (yellow card) 90+5'	Report	Lundgaard (yellow card) 34'; Flint 45+3'; Taylor (yellow card) 90+6'	Stadium: Pirelli Stadium; Attendance: 485; Referee: Lisa Benn

8 November 2023 2	Liverpool	3–4	Manchester City	Birkenhead
19:00 GMT	Bonner 45'; Flint 47'; Enderby 90+6'	Report	Angeldahl 33'; Park 48'; Kelly 69', 81'	Stadium: Prenton Park; Attendance: 1,045; Referee: Elizabeth Simms

22 November 2023 3	Liverpool	0–1	Manchester United	Birkenhead
19:00 GMT	Taylor (yellow card) 45+2'	Report	Parris 41'; Ladd (yellow card) 56'; Blundell (yellow card) 86'	Stadium: Prenton Park; Attendance: 1,958; Referee: Melissa Burgin

13 December 2023 4	Everton	1–2	Liverpool	Liverpool
19:00 GMT	Duggan 90+9'	Report	Haug 5'; Daniëls 56'	Stadium: Walton Hall Park; Referee: Melissa Burgin

== Squad statistics ==
=== Appearances ===
As of match played 18 May 2024

Starting appearances are listed first, followed by substitute appearances after the + symbol where applicable.

No.	Pos	Nat	Player	Total		WSL		FA Cup		League Cup	
No.	Pos	Nat	Player	Apps	Goals	Apps	Goals	Apps	Goals	Apps	Goals
1	GK	(England) ENG	Rachael Laws	19	0	15	0	2	0	2	0
2	DF	(Finland) FIN	Emma Koivisto	24	2	17+2	2	2+1	0	0+2	0
4	DF	(England) ENG	Grace Fisk	29	1	22	1	3	0	3+1	0
5	DF	(Republic of Ireland) IRL	Niamh Fahey	11	0	6+2	0	2	0	1	0
6	DF	(England) ENG	Jasmine Matthews	17	0	7+5	0	2+1	0	2	0
7	MF	(England) ENG	Missy Bo Kearns	24	1	9+11	1	1+1	0	2	0
8	MF	(Japan) JPN	Fūka Nagano	25	0	21	0	2	0	0+2	0
9	FW	(Republic of Ireland) IRL	Leanne Kiernan	19	5	4+10	5	0+2	0	1+2	0
10	FW	(Norway) NOR	Sophie Román Haug	24	9	19+1	7	2	1	1+1	1
11	FW	(England) ENG	Melissa Lawley	23	2	5+12	1	2+1	1	2+1	0
12	DF	(England) ENG	Taylor Hinds	20	2	15+1	2	1	0	1+2	0
13	DF	(England) ENG	Mia Enderby	20	1	6+8	0	2+1	0	3	1
14	MF	(Austria) AUT	Marie Höbinger	29	5	18+4	5	3	0	1+3	0
15	MF	(Denmark) DEN	Sofie Lundgaard	17	0	3+8	0	1+2	0	3	0
16	GK	(Australia) AUS	Teagan Micah	10	0	7	0	1	0	2	0
17	DF	(Scotland) SCO	Jenna Clark	28	1	18+3	1	3	0	3+1	0
18	MF	(Wales) WAL	Ceri Holland	24	2	18+1	2	2	0	2+1	0
19	FW	(Netherlands) NED	Shanice van de Sanden	14	1	5+5	1	0+2	0	1+1	0
20	FW	(Belgium) BEL	Yana Daniëls	17	1	2+10	0	0+1	0	3+1	1
22	GK	(England) ENG	Faye Kirby	0	0	0	0	0	0	0	0
23	DF	(England) ENG	Gemma Bonner	24	4	19+1	2	1	1	1+2	1
32	DF	(England) ENG	Lucy Parry	16	0	3+7	0	1+1	0	4	0
36	MF	(England) ENG	Zara Shaw	1	0	0+1	0	0	0	0	0
57	MF	(England) ENG	Mia Leath	1	0	0+1	0	0	0	0	0
Players away from the club on loan:
26	FW	(England) ENG	Natasha Flint	10	3	2+4	1	0+1	0	3	2
34	MF	(England) ENG	Hannah Silcock	0	0	0	0	0	0	0	0
35	MF	(England) ENG	Miri Taylor	6	1	1+2	1	0	0	3	0

=== Goalscorers ===
Rank	Pos.	No.	Player	WSL	FA Cup	League Cup	Total
1	FW	10	(Norway) Sophie Román Haug	7	1	1	9
2	FW	9	(Republic of Ireland) Leanne Kiernan	5	0	0	5
2	MF	14	(Austria) Marie Höbinger	5	0	0	5
4	DF	23	(England) Gemma Bonner	2	1	1	4
5	FW	26	(England) Natasha Flint	1	0	2	3
6	DF	2	(Finland) Emma Koivisto	2	0	0	2
6	FW	11	(England) Melissa Lawley	1	1	0	2
6	DF	12	(England) Taylor Hinds	2	0	0	2
6	MF	18	(Wales) Ceri Holland	2	0	0	2
10	DF	4	(England) Grace Fisk	1	0	0	1
10	MF	7	(England) Missy Bo Kearns	1	0	0	1
10	FW	13	(England) Mia Enderby	0	0	1	1
10	DF	17	(Scotland) Jenna Clark	1	0	0	1
10	FW	19	(Netherlands) Shanice van de Sanden	1	0	0	1
10	FW	20	(Belgium) Yana Daniëls	0	0	1	1
10	MF	35	(England) Miri Taylor	1	0	0	1
Own goals				4	0	0	4
Total				36	3	6	45

=== Clean sheets ===
Rank	Pos.	No.	Player	WSL	FA Cup	League Cup	Total
1	GK	1	(England) Rachael Laws	5	1	0	6
2	GK	16	(Australia) Teagan Micah	3	1	0	4
Total				8	2	0	10

=== Disciplinary record ===
No.	Pos.	Player	WSL			FA Cup			League Cup			Total		
No.	Pos.	Player	Booked	(yellow card) (yellow-red card)	Sent off (straight red)	Booked	(yellow card) (yellow-red card)	Sent off (straight red)	Booked	(yellow card) (yellow-red card)	Sent off (straight red)	Booked	(yellow card) (yellow-red card)	Sent off (straight red)
2	DF	(Finland) Emma Koivisto	2	0	0	0	0	0	0	0	0	2	0	0
4	DF	(England) Grace Fisk	3	0	0	0	0	0	0	0	0	3	0	0
5	DF	(Republic of Ireland) Niamh Fahey	1	0	0	0	0	0	0	0	0	1	0	0
6	DF	(England) Jasmine Matthews	1	0	0	0	0	0	0	0	0	1	0	0
7	MF	(England) Missy Bo Kearns	3	0	0	0	0	0	0	0	0	3	0	0
8	MF	(Japan) Fūka Nagano	1	0	0	0	0	0	0	0	0	1	0	0
10	FW	(Norway) Sophie Román Haug	1	0	0	0	0	0	0	0	0	1	0	0
11	FW	(England) Melissa Lawley	2	0	0	0	0	0	0	0	0	2	0	0
12	DF	(England) Taylor Hinds	4	0	0	0	0	0	0	0	0	4	0	0
13	FW	(England) Mia Enderby	2	0	0	0	0	0	0	0	0	2	0	0
15	MF	(Denmark) Sofie Lundgaard	1	0	0	0	0	0	1	0	0	2	0	0
16	GK	(Australia) Teagan Micah	1	0	0	0	0	0	0	0	0	1	0	0
17	DF	(Scotland) Jenna Clark	2	0	0	0	0	0	0	0	0	2	0	0
18	MF	(Wales) Ceri Holland	4	1	0	0	1	0	0	0	0	4	2	0
19	MF	(Netherlands) Shanice van de Sanden	1	0	0	0	0	0	0	0	0	1	0	0
20	FW	(Belgium) Yana Daniëls	3	0	0	0	0	0	0	0	0	3	0	0
23	DF	(England) Gemma Bonner	7	0	0	0	0	0	0	0	0	7	0	0
35	MF	(England) Miri Taylor	0	0	0	0	0	0	2	0	0	2	0	0
Total			39	1	0	0	1	0	3	0	0	41	2	0

== Transfers ==
=== Transfers in ===
Date	Position	Nationality	Name	From	Ref.
5 July 2023	FW	(England)	Natasha Flint	(England) Leicester City	
10 July 2023	DF	(Scotland)	Jenna Clark	(Scotland) Glasgow City	
13 July 2023	FW	(England)	Mia Enderby	(England) Sheffield United	
17 July 2023	GK	(Australia)	Teagan Micah	(Sweden) Rosengård	
20 July 2023	DF	(England)	Grace Fisk	(England) West Ham United	
31 July 2023	MF	(Austria)	Marie Höbinger	(Switzerland) FC Zürich	
6 September 2023	FW	(Norway)	Sophie Román Haug	(Italy) Roma	

=== Transfers out ===
Date	Position	Nationality	Name	To	Ref.
28 May 2023	GK	(England)	Charlotte Clarke	(England) Birmingham City	
28 May 2023	GK	(Canada)	Rylee Foster	(New Zealand) Wellington Phoenix	
28 May 2023	FW	(England)	Ashley Hodson	(England) Sheffield United	
28 May 2023	MF	(England)	Carla Humphrey	(England) Charlton Athletic	
28 May 2023	DF	(Republic of Ireland)	Megan Campbell	(England) Everton	
28 May 2023	DF	(England)	Leighanne Robe	(Saudi Arabia) Al-Ittihad	
28 May 2023	MF	(Wales)	Rhiannon Roberts	(Spain) Real Betis	
7 August 2023	GK	(Scotland)	Eartha Cumings	(Sweden) Rosengård	
9 August 2023	FW	(England)	Kate Oakley	(England) Lewes	
13 September 2023	FW	(United States)	Katie Stengel	(United States) NJ/NY Gotham	

=== Loans out ===
Date	Position	Nationality	Name	To	Until	Ref.
5 July 2023	FW	(United States)	Katie Stengel	(United States) NJ/NY Gotham	3 September 2023	
29 July 2023	GK	(England)	Faye Kirby	(Scotland) Aberdeen	17 September 2023 (Note: The loan, initially planned to run until 1 January 2024, was prematurely ended after Kirby suffered an anterior cruciate ligament injury.)	
25 August 2023	DF	(England)	Hannah Silcock	(England) Blackburn Rovers	End of season	
24 January 2024	FW	(England)	Natasha Flint	(Scotland) Celtic	End of season	
1 February 2024	MF	(England)	Miri Taylor	(England) Aston Villa	End of season	

=== Contract extensions ===
Date	Position	Nationality	Name	Contract until	Ref.
13 June 2023	DF	(Republic of Ireland)	Niamh Fahey	1 July 2024	
8 August 2023	FW	(Belgium)	Yana Daniëls	Undisclosed	
9 August 2023	DF	(England)	Jasmine Matthews	Undisclosed	
10 August 2023	MF	(England)	Missy Bo Kearns	Undisclosed	
11 August 2023	MF	(Wales)	Ceri Holland	Undisclosed	
