= 2020–21 Liverpool F.C. Women season =

Liverpool
2020–21 season
- Head coach: Vicky Jepson (until 12 January); Amber Whiteley (interim) (from 12 January)
- Stadium: Prenton Park, Birkenhead
- Championship: 3rd
- FA Cup: Fourth round
- League Cup: Group stage
- Top goalscorer: League: Rinsola Babajide and Rachel Furness (5); All: Rachel Furness (7)
| Home colours | Away colours | Third colours |

The 2020–21 Liverpool F.C. Women season was the club's 32nd season of competitive football and its first season outside the FA WSL, the highest level of the football pyramid, since the league's foundation. Along with competing in the FA Women's Championship, the club also contested two domestic cup competitions: the FA Cup and the League Cup.

Niamh Fahey was announced as captain on 17 August 2020, replacing Sophie Bradley-Auckland who took a leave of absence in order to focus on the running of her family's residential care home business amid the COVID-19 pandemic. Rachel Furness was named vice-captain.

Manager Vicky Jepson departed the club by mutual consent on 12 January 2021 with the club sat in 3rd place in the league. She had been in charge since October 2018 having first joined the club as a programme lead for the LFC Foundation in 2009. Assistant manager Amber Whiteley assumed the role on an interim basis.

== Squad ==
As of 28 February 2021.

Note: Flags indicate national team as defined under FIFA eligibility rules; some limited exceptions apply. Players may hold more than one non-FIFA nationality.

| No. | Pos. | Nation | Player |
|---|---|---|---|
| 1 | GK | ENG | Rachael Laws |
| 2 | DF | ENG | Becky Jane |
| 3 | DF | ENG | Leighanne Robe |
| 4 | MF | WAL | Rhiannon Roberts |
| 5 | DF | IRL | Niamh Fahey (captain) |
| 6 | DF | ENG | Sophie Bradley-Auckland |
| 7 | FW | ENG | Jessica Clarke |
| 8 | MF | ENG | Jade Bailey |
| 9 | FW | DEN | Amalie Thestrup |
| 10 | FW | ENG | Rinsola Babajide |
| 11 | MF | ENG | Melissa Lawley |
| 12 | DF | ENG | Taylor Hinds |

| No. | Pos. | Nation | Player |
|---|---|---|---|
| 13 | GK | CAN | Rylee Foster |
| 14 | FW | ENG | Ashley Hodson |
| 15 | DF | NZL | Meikayla Moore |
| 18 | MF | WAL | Ceri Holland |
| 19 | MF | ENG | Amy Rodgers |
| 21 | MF | ENG | Missy Bo Kearns |
| 24 | FW | ENG | Kirsty Linnett |
| 27 | MF | NIR | Rachel Furness (vice-captain) |
| 30 | MF | ENG | Emily Brough |
| 32 | DF | ENG | Lucy Parry |
| — | GK | ENG | Eleanor Heeps |
| — | FW | ENG | Mia Ross |

== Pre-season ==
Liverpool scheduled five preseason games ahead of their debut FA Women's Championship campaign, putting particular focus on playing Coventry United away in order to acclimate themselves to the 3G surface that five Championship teams play on. All games were behind closed doors in order to fit with COVID-19 health restrictions.

| 9 August 2020 Friendly | Liverpool | – | Blackburn Rovers |
| | | | | Attendance: Behind-closed-doors |
Note: No official scoreline released

| 12 August 2020 Friendly | Liverpool | – | Reading |
| | | | | Attendance: Behind-closed-doors |
Note: No official scoreline released

| 16 August 2020 Friendly | Liverpool | – | Brighton & Hove Albion | Birkenhead |
| | | | | Stadium: Prenton Park; Attendance: Behind-closed-doors |
Note: No official scoreline released

| 23 August 2020 Friendly | Coventry United | 1–4 | Liverpool | Coventry |
| | Merrick | Report | Clarke x2; Babajide; Fahey | Stadium: Butts Park Arena; Attendance: Behind-closed-doors |

| 30 August 2020 Friendly | Manchester United | 0–0 | Liverpool | Leigh |
| | | Report | | Stadium: Leigh Sports Village; Attendance: Behind-closed-doors |

== FA Women's Championship ==
=== Results summary ===
| Overall | | | | | | | | Home | | | | | | Away | | | | | |
| Pld | W | D | L | GF | GA | GD | Pts | W | D | L | GF | GA | GD | W | D | L | GF | GA | GD |
|---|---|---|---|---|---|---|---|---|---|---|---|---|---|---|---|---|---|---|---|
| 20 | 11 | 6 | 3 | 37 | 15 | +22 | 39 | 6 | 3 | 1 | 24 | 6 | +18 | 5 | 3 | 2 | 13 | 9 | +4 |

Last updated: 2 May 2021.
Source: FA WSL

=== Results ===
| 6 September 2020 1 | Liverpool | 1–1 | Durham | Birkenhead |
| 14:00 | Furness 38'; Babajide (yellow card) 46' | Report | Lambert (yellow card) 11'; Holmes (yellow card) 63'; Wilson (yellow card) 76'; Hepple 87' | Stadium: Prenton Park; Attendance: Behind-closed-doors; Referee: Lucy Oliver |

| 13 September 2020 2 | London Bees | 0–3 | Liverpool | Canons Park |
| 14:00 | Robert (yellow card) 29' | Report | Lawley 50'; Babajide 60'; Furness 90' | Stadium: The Hive Stadium; Attendance: Behind-closed-doors; Referee: Sarah Garratt |

| 27 September 2020 3 | Liverpool | 4–0 | Charlton Athletic | Birkenhead |
| 14:00 | Furness 12', 84'; Bailey 34', (yellow card) 58'; Linnett 90' | Report | Legg (yellow card) 51' | Stadium: Prenton Park; Attendance: Behind-closed-doors; Referee: Melissa Burgin |

| 4 October 2020 4 | Coventry United | 1–2 | Liverpool | Coventry |
| 14:00 | Anderson 71' | Report | Lawley 11'; Thestrup 33' | Stadium: Butts Park Arena; Attendance: Behind-closed-doors |

| 11 October 2020 5 | Leicester City | 2–1 | Liverpool | Quorn |
| 14:00 | Devlin (yellow card) 21'; Bailey-Gayle 23'; Paul 56'; Blanchard (yellow card) 90+8' | Report | Clarke 58'; Linnett (yellow card) 63'; Fahey (yellow card) 90' | Stadium: Farley Way Stadium; Attendance: Behind-closed-doors; Referee: Lucy-Ann Briggs |

| 1 November 2020 6 | Lewes | 2–2 | Liverpool | Lewes |
| 12:00 | Rood 43'; Hack 74'; Jhamat (yellow card) 82' | Report | Thestrup 25'; Babajide 58' | Stadium: The Dripping Pan; Attendance: Behind-closed-doors; Referee: Jane Simms |

| 8 November 2020 7 | Liverpool | 1–0 | Sheffield United | Birkenhead |
| 14:00 | Babajide 5'; Laws (yellow card) 90' | Report | | Stadium: Prenton Park; Attendance: Behind-closed-doors; Referee: Daniel Locker |

| 15 November 2020 8 | Blackburn Rovers | 0–0 | Liverpool | Bamber Bridge |
| 14:00 | | Report | | Stadium: Sir Tom Finney Stadium; Attendance: Behind-closed-doors; Referee: Cristiana Hattersley |

| 6 December 2020 9 | Liverpool | 4–0 | Crystal Palace | Birkenhead |
| 14:00 | Babajide 2', 90+5'; Rodgers 32'; Thestrup 75' | Report | | Stadium: Prenton Park; Attendance: 192; Referee: Richard Aspinall |

| 13 December 2020 10 | London City Lionesses | 0–1 | Liverpool | Dartford |
| 14:00 | Ejupi (yellow card) 80' | Report | Moore 31' | Stadium: Princes Park; Attendance: Behind-closed-doors; Referee: Georgia Ball |

| 20 December 2020 11 | Durham | 2–0 | Liverpool | Durham |
| 12:00 | Sharpe 45'; Robson (yellow card) 54'; E. Roberts 70' | Report | Babajide (yellow card) 34' | Stadium: Maiden Castle; Attendance: Behind-closed-doors; Referee: James Westgate |

| 17 January 2021 12 | Liverpool | 1–2 | Leicester City | Birkenhead |
| 14:00 | Kearns 10'; Babajide (yellow card) 30'; Lawley (red card) 47' | Report | Flint 43' (pen.); Devlin (yellow card) 71', (goal) 81' | Stadium: Prenton Park; Attendance: Behind-closed-doors; Referee: Chloe Ann-Anderson |

| 7 February 2021 13 | Charlton Athletic | 2–2 | Liverpool | Crayford |
| 14:00 | Vassell 18'; Clifford 90+1' (pen.) | Report | Furness 77'; Holland 89' | Stadium: The Oakwood; Attendance: Behind-closed-doors; Referee: Jordan Gibson |

| 28 February 2021 14 | Liverpool | 3–0 | London Bees | Birkenhead |
| 14:00 | Jane 8'; Holland 73'; Rodgers 79' | Report | Gibson (yellow card) 18' | Stadium: Prenton Park; Attendance: Behind-closed-doors; Referee: Lauren Impey |

| 7 March 2021 15 | Crystal Palace | 0–1 | Liverpool | Bromley |
| 14:00 | | Report | Fahey 65' | Stadium: Hayes Lane; Attendance: Behind-closed-doors; Referee: Lucy May |

| 14 March 2021 16 | Liverpool | 5–0 | Coventry United | Birkenhead |
| 14:00 | Fahey 23', 67'; Jane 24'; Holland 52'; Lawley 84' | Report | | Stadium: Prenton Park; Attendance: Behind-closed-doors; Referee: Lucy Anne-Briggs |

| 28 March 2021 17 | Liverpool | 1–1 | Blackburn Rovers | Birkenhead |
| 18:30 | Kearns 34' | Report | Hughes 60' | Stadium: Prenton Park; Attendance: Behind-closed-doors; Referee: Amy Barber |

| 4 April 2021 18 | Liverpool | 2–0 | Lewes | Birkenhead |
| 12:00 | Cousins 7' (o.g.); Moore 55' | Report | O'Rourke (yellow card) 32' | Stadium: Prenton Park; Attendance: Behind-closed-doors; Referee: Declan Brown |

| 25 April 2021 19 | Sheffield United | 0–1 | Liverpool | Chesterfield |
| 14:00 | | Report | Thestrup 30'; Hinds (yellow card) 84' (yellow-red card) 90+1'; Foster (yellow card) 89' | Stadium: Technique Stadium; Attendance: Behind-closed-doors; Referee: Magdalena Golba |

| 2 May 2021 20 | Liverpool | 2–2 | London City Lionesses | Birkenhead |
| 14:00 | Jane 44'; Rodgers 56' | Report | Bennett 68'; Agg 81' | Stadium: Prenton Park; Attendance: Behind-closed-doors; Referee: Lauren Impey |

=== League table ===
| Pos | Team | Pld | W | D | L | GF | GA | GD | Pts | Qualification |
|---|---|---|---|---|---|---|---|---|---|---|
| 1 | Leicester City (C, P) | 20 | 16 | 2 | 2 | 54 | 16 | +38 | 50 | Promotion to the WSL (Note: Dependent on obtaining a licence.) |
| 2 | Durham | 20 | 12 | 6 | 2 | 34 | 15 | +19 | 42 | |
| 3 | Liverpool | 20 | 11 | 6 | 3 | 37 | 15 | +22 | 39 | |
| 4 | Sheffield United | 20 | 11 | 5 | 4 | 37 | 15 | +22 | 38 | |
| 5 | Lewes | 20 | 8 | 4 | 8 | 19 | 22 | −3 | 28 | |

Rules for classification: 1) Points; 2) Goal difference; 3) Number of goals scored
(C) Champions; (P) Promoted

== Women's FA Cup ==
As a member of the top two tiers, Liverpool will enter the FA Cup in the fourth round proper. Originally scheduled to take place on 31 January 2021, it was delayed due to COVID-19 restrictions.

| 18 April 2021 Fourth round | Leicester City | 1–0 | Liverpool | Quorn |
| 14:00 | Cain 72' | Report | | Stadium: Farley Way Stadium; Attendance: Behind-closed-doors |

== FA Women's League Cup ==
| 7 October 2020 Group stage | Liverpool | 3–1 | Manchester United | Birkenhead |
| 14:00 | Fahey (yellow card) 28'; Furness 33' (pen.), 83'; Hinds (yellow card) 64'; Babajide 72' (pen.) | Report | McManus 28'; Toone (yellow card) 88' | Stadium: Prenton Park; Attendance: Behind-closed-doors; Referee: Rebecca Walsh |

| 4 November 2020 Group stage | Liverpool | 0–3 | Manchester City | Birkenhead |
| 14:00 | | Report | Coombs 42'; Lavelle 52'; Park 90+2' | Stadium: Prenton Park; Attendance: Behind-closed-doors; Referee: Sarah Garratt |

| 18 November 2020 Group stage | Everton | 1–0 | Liverpool | Liverpool |
| 19:00 | Christiansen 6' | Report | | Stadium: Walton Hall Park; Attendance: Behind-closed-doors |

| Pos | Team | Pld | W | WPEN | LPEN | L | GF | GA | GD | Pts | Qualification | MCI | EVE | LIV | MNU |
|---|---|---|---|---|---|---|---|---|---|---|---|---|---|---|---|
| 1 | Manchester City | 3 | 2 | 0 | 1 | 0 | 6 | 1 | +5 | 7 | Advanced to knock-out stage | — | 3–1 | — | — |
| 2 | Everton | 3 | 2 | 0 | 0 | 1 | 3 | 3 | 0 | 6 | Possible knock-out stage based on ranking | — | — | 1–0 | 1–0 |
| 3 | Liverpool | 3 | 1 | 0 | 0 | 2 | 3 | 5 | −2 | 3 | | 0–3 | — | — | 3–1 |
| 4 | Manchester United | 3 | 0 | 1 | 0 | 2 | 1 | 4 | −3 | 2 | | 0–0 | — | — | — |

Source: thefa.com
Rules for classification: 1) Points; 2) Goal difference; 3) Number of goals scored; 4) Number of wins; 5) Head-to-head record

== Squad statistics ==
=== Appearances ===
As of 2 May 2021

Starting appearances are listed first, followed by substitute appearances after the + symbol where applicable.

| No. | Pos | Nat | Player | Total | | League | | FA Cup | | League Cup | |
| No. | Pos | Nat | Player | Apps | Goals | Apps | Goals | Apps | Goals | Apps | Goals |
|---|---|---|---|---|---|---|---|---|---|---|---|
| 1 | GK | (England) ENG | Rachael Laws | 19 | 0 | 17+1 | 0 | 1 | 0 | 0 | 0 |
| 2 | DF | (England) ENG | Becky Jane | 16 | 3 | 12+2 | 3 | 0+1 | 0 | 1 | 0 |
| 3 | DF | (England) ENG | Leighanne Robe | 17 | 0 | 12+1 | 0 | 1 | 0 | 3 | 0 |
| 4 | MF | (Wales) WAL | Rhiannon Roberts | 22 | 0 | 19 | 0 | 1 | 0 | 2 | 0 |
| 5 | DF | (Republic of Ireland) IRL | Niamh Fahey | 23 | 3 | 19 | 3 | 0+1 | 0 | 3 | 0 |
| 6 | DF | (England) ENG | Sophie Bradley-Auckland | 0 | 0 | 0 | 0 | 0 | 0 | 0 | 0 |
| 7 | FW | (England) ENG | Jessica Clarke | 12 | 1 | 4+6 | 1 | 0 | 0 | 2 | 0 |
| 8 | MF | (England) ENG | Jade Bailey | 15 | 1 | 11+1 | 1 | 1 | 0 | 2 | 0 |
| 9 | FW | (Denmark) DEN | Amalie Thestrup | 21 | 4 | 12+5 | 4 | 1 | 0 | 2+1 | 0 |
| 10 | FW | (England) ENG | Rinsola Babajide | 15 | 6 | 11+1 | 5 | 0 | 0 | 2+1 | 1 |
| 11 | MF | (England) ENG | Melissa Lawley | 23 | 3 | 14+5 | 3 | 1 | 0 | 3 | 0 |
| 12 | DF | (England) ENG | Taylor Hinds | 24 | 0 | 20 | 0 | 1 | 0 | 3 | 0 |
| 13 | GK | (Canada) CAN | Rylee Foster | 6 | 0 | 3 | 0 | 0 | 0 | 3 | 0 |
| 14 | FW | (England) ENG | Ashley Hodson | 14 | 0 | 9+3 | 0 | 0 | 0 | 1+1 | 0 |
| 15 | DF | (New Zealand) NZL | Meikayla Moore | 19 | 2 | 11+4 | 2 | 1 | 0 | 2+1 | 0 |
| 18 | MF | (Wales) WAL | Ceri Holland | 8 | 3 | 5+2 | 3 | 0+1 | 0 | 0 | 0 |
| 19 | MF | (England) ENG | Amy Rodgers | 16 | 3 | 10+4 | 3 | 1 | 0 | 0+1 | 0 |
| 21 | MF | (England) ENG | Missy Bo Kearns | 19 | 2 | 8+7 | 2 | 1 | 0 | 1+2 | 0 |
| 24 | FW | (England) ENG | Kirsty Linnett | 15 | 1 | 8+5 | 1 | 1 | 0 | 1 | 0 |
| 27 | MF | (Northern Ireland) NIR | Rachel Furness | 19 | 7 | 13+3 | 5 | 0 | 0 | 2+1 | 2 |
| 30 | MF | (England) ENG | Emily Brough | 1 | 0 | 0+1 | 0 | 0 | 0 | 0 | 0 |
| 32 | DF | (England) ENG | Lucy Parry | 8 | 0 | 2+3 | 0 | 0+1 | 0 | 0+2 | 0 |
| | GK | (England) ENG | Eleanor Heeps | 0 | 0 | 0 | 0 | 0 | 0 | 0 | 0 |
| | FW | (England) ENG | Mia Ross | 1 | 0 | 0 | 0 | 0 | 0 | 0+1 | 0 |

== Transfers ==
=== Transfers in ===
| Date | Position | Nationality | Name | From | Ref. |
|---|---|---|---|---|---|
| 7 July 2020 | GK | (England) | Rachael Laws | (England) Reading | |
| 16 July 2020 | DF | (England) | Taylor Hinds | (England) Everton | |
| 17 July 2020 | FW | (Denmark) | Amalie Thestrup | (Italy) Roma | |
| 28 August 2020 | DF | (New Zealand) | Meikayla Moore | (Germany) MSV Duisburg | |
| 28 January 2021 | MF | (Wales) | Ceri Holland | (United States) Kansas Jayhawks | |

=== Transfers out ===
| Date | Position | Nationality | Name | To | Ref. |
|---|---|---|---|---|---|
| 23 May 2020 | FW | (England) | Courtney Sweetman-Kirk | (England) Sheffield United | |
| 29 May 2020 | GK | (Germany) | Anke Preuß | (Sweden) Vittsjö | |
| 30 May 2020 | MF | (Scotland) | Christie Murray | (England) Birmingham City | |
| 2 June 2020 | GK | (England) | Fran Kitching | (England) Sheffield United | |
| 19 June 2020 | FW | (England) | Niamh Charles | (England) Chelsea | |
| 2 July 2020 | DF | (England) | Jemma Purfield | (England) Bristol City | |
