= Sofie Lundgaard =

Danish footballer (born 2002)

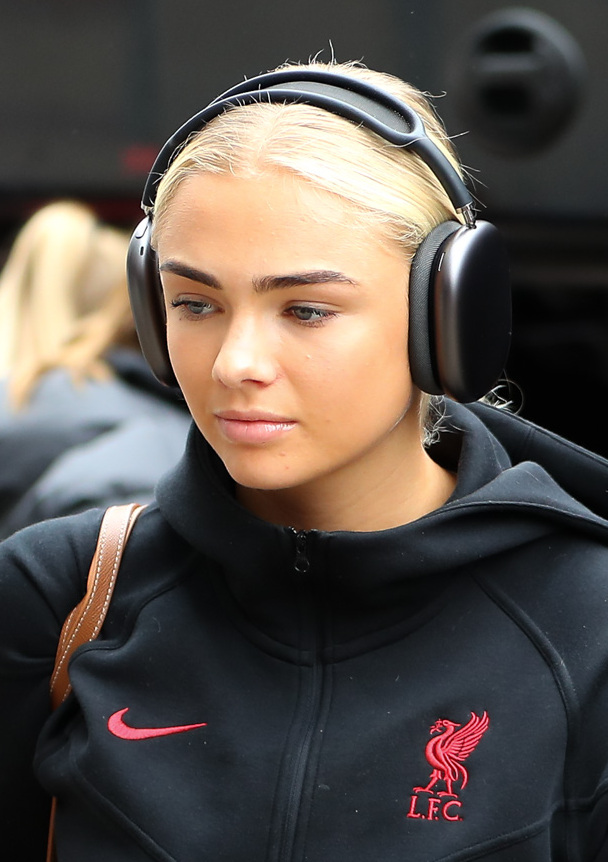
- Lundgaard with Liverpool in 2024

Personal information
- Full name: Sofie Lundgaard Pedersen
- Date of birth: 29 May 2002 (age 24)
- Place of birth: Aalborg, Denmark
- Position: Midfielder

Team information
- Current team: Eintracht Frankfurt
- Number: 6

Senior career*
Years	Team	Apps	(Gls)
2018–2019	AaB	0	(0)
2019–2023	Fortuna Hjørring	77	(12)
2023–2026	Liverpool	29	(0)
2026–	Eintracht Frankfurt	1	(0)

International career^{‡}
2017–2018	Denmark U16	8	(1)
2018–2019	Denmark U17	13	(6)
2019–2020	Denmark U19	8	(6)
2023–	Denmark U23	9	(0)
- * Club domestic league appearances and goals as of 21:05, 18 November 2026 (UTC) ‡ National team caps and goals as of 23:53, 25 October 2025 (UTC)

Sofie Lundgaard Pedersen (Danish: [soˈfiˀə ˈlɔnˀˌkɒˀ ˈpʰe(ː)ðɐsn̩]; born 29 May 2002) is a Danish professional footballer who plays as a midfielder for Frauen-Bundesliga club Eintracht Frankfurt.

== Career ==
In February 2019, Lundgaard transferred to Fortuna Hjørring. On 10 January 2023, she signed for Liverpool.

On 14 August 2026, Lundgaard joined Frauen-Bundesliga side Eintracht Frankfurt for an undisclosed fee, signing a contract until 2029.

== Career statistics ==
=== Club ===
As of match played 15 November 2026

Appearances and goals by club, season and competition
Club	Season	League			National cup (Note: Includes Danish Women's Cup, Women's FA Cup)		League cup (Note: Includes FA Women's League Cup)		Continental (Note: Includes UEFA Women's Champions League)		Total	
Club	Season	Division	Apps	Goals	Apps	Goals	Apps	Goals	Apps	Goals	Apps	Goals
Fortuna Hjørring	2018–19	A-Liga	3	0	4	3	—		—		7	3
Fortuna Hjørring	2019–20	A-Liga	19	4	3	0	—		4	0	26	4
Fortuna Hjørring	2020–21	A-Liga	23	5	2	0	—		4	0	29	5
Fortuna Hjørring	2021–22	A-Liga	20	2	5	0	—		2	0	27	2
Fortuna Hjørring	2022–23	A-Liga	12	1	1	0	—		—		13	1
Fortuna Hjørring	Total		77	12	15	3	—		10	0	102	15
Liverpool	2022–23	Women's Super League	12	0	1	0	1	0	—		14	0
Liverpool	2023–24	Women's Super League	11	0	3	0	3	0	—		17	0
Liverpool	2024–25	Women's Super League	3	0	3	0	1	0	—		7	0
Liverpool	2025–26	Women's Super League	3	0	1	0	3	0	—		7	0
Liverpool	Total		29	0	8	0	8	0	—		45	0
Eintracht Frankfurt	2026–27	Frauen-Bundesliga	1	0	1	0	—		2	0 (Note: appearances in UEFA Women's Europa Cup)	4	0
Career total			107	12	24	3	8	0	12	0	151	15

== Honours ==
Fortuna Hjørring

- A-Liga: 2019–20
- Danish Women's Cup: 2018–19, 2021–22
