= Taylor Hinds =

English footballer (born 1999)

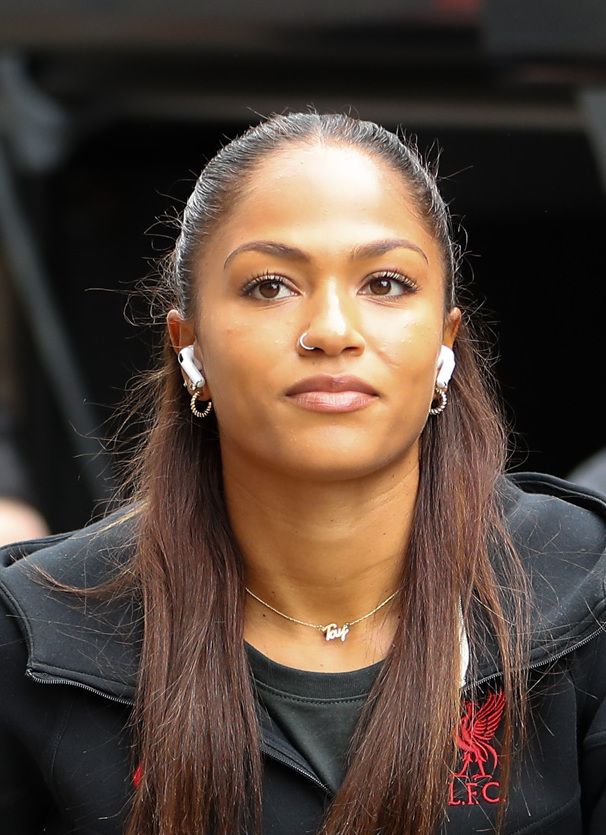
- Hinds with Liverpool in 2024

Personal information
- Full name: Taylor Jasmine Hinds
- Date of birth: 25 April 1999 (age 27)
- Place of birth: Northampton, England
- Height: 1.60 m (5 ft 3 in)
- Positions: Left-back; left wing-back

Team information
- Current team: Arsenal
- Number: 24

Youth career
- Northampton Town
- Arsenal

Senior career*
Years	Team	Apps	(Gls)
2017–2018	Arsenal	0	(0)
2018–2020	Everton	24	(0)
2020–2025	Liverpool	131	(8)
2025–	Arsenal	20	(0)

International career^{‡}
2014–2016	England U17	20	(11)
2017–2018	England U19	8	(3)
2024–2025	Jamaica	1	(0)
2025–	England	5	(0)
Medal record
Women's football
Representing England
FIFA U-20 Women's World Cup
Third place	2018 France
- * Club domestic league appearances and goals as of 20:20, 22 November 2026 (UTC) ‡ National team caps and goals as of 22:05, 7 March 2026 (UTC)

Taylor Jasmine Hinds (/haɪndz/ HYNDZE; born 25 April 1999) is an English professional footballer who plays as a left-back or left wing-back for Women's Super League club Arsenal and the England national team. Hinds previously played for Liverpool, Everton, England youth teams, and represented Jamaica at international level.

== Club career ==
=== Arsenal ===
Hinds began playing football at the age of ten with the development squad for Northampton Town. She was scouted by an Arsenal staff member and began playing with the junior squad soon after. Hinds made her debut for Arsenal during a 7–0 win over London Bees during the 2017 FA WSL Cup. She subbed in during the 46th minute of the match for Emma Mitchell.

=== Everton ===
In January 2018, Hinds signed with Everton through summer of 2019 alongside teammate Chloe Kelly, who was already on loan with the Blues.

=== Liverpool ===
Hinds signed for Liverpool in July 2020; she signed a new long-term contract in January 2022, winning the FA Women's Championship with the Reds in the same season. In the Spring of 2023, she was named Liverpool vice-captain and has captained Liverpool on a number of occasions since in the absence of club captain Niamh Fahey.

In March 2025, during a Women's FA Cup quarter-final win over Arsenal, Hinds was the subject of "sexually inappropriate comments" from a member of the crowd, who was subsequently removed. Liverpool and Hinds released a joint statement condemning the incident, with Hinds being praised by her manager Amber Whiteley for "taking a stand".

On 30 June 2025, it was announced that Hinds was departing Liverpool upon the expiry of her contract.

=== Return to Arsenal ===
On 7 July 2025, it was announced that Hinds had re-signed for Arsenal.

== International career ==
Hinds has represented England on the under-17, under-19 and under-23 national teams. Hinds was part of the England squad that won Bronze at the 2018 FIFA U-20 Women's World Cup in France. She competed with the under-17 team at the 2016 FIFA U-17 Women's World Cup in Jordan.

Hinds opted to represent Jamaica at the senior level and received her first call-up to the senior squad in October 2024 for a friendly match against France. She made her debut appearance in the match, while remaining eligible for England, her country of birth, having not played a competitive fixture for Jamaica.

Hinds was then selected for the England senior squad in October 2025, making the switch back from Jamaica. She made her England senior debut during a 3–0 friendly win against Australia on 28 October.

== Career statistics ==
=== Club ===
As of match played 22 November 2026.

Appearances and goals by club, season and competition
Club	Season	League			FA Cup (Note: Includes the Women's FA Cup)		League Cup (Note: Includes the Women's League Cup)		Continental (Note: Includes the UEFA Women's Champions League)		Other		Total	
Club	Season	Division	Apps	Goals	Apps	Goals	Apps	Goals	Apps	Goals	Apps	Goals	Apps	Goals
Arsenal	2017–18	Women's Super League	0	0	0	0	2	0	—		—		2	0
Everton	2017–18	Women's Super League	6	0	2	0	0	0	—		—		8	0
Everton	2018–19	Women's Super League	12	0	1	0	2	0	—		—		15	0
Everton	2019–20	Women's Super League	6	0	1	0	4	1	—		—		11	1
Everton	Total		24	0	4	0	6	1	0	0	0	0	34	1
Liverpool	2020–21	Championship	20	0	1	0	3	0	—		—		24	0
Liverpool	2021–22	Championship	22	3	2	0	5	1	—		—		29	4
Liverpool	2022–23	Women's Super League	22	0	1	0	5	0	—		—		28	0
Liverpool	2023–24	Women's Super League	16	2	1	0	3	0	—		—		20	2
Liverpool	2024–25	Women's Super League	22	2	4	0	3	0	—		—		29	2
Liverpool	Total		102	7	9	0	19	1	0	0	0	0	130	8
Arsenal	2025–26	Women’s Super League	16	0	2	0	1	0	10	0	1 (Note: Appearance(s) in the FIFA Women's Champions Cup)	0	30	0
Arsenal	2026–27	Women's Super League	4	0	0	0	—		4	0	—		8	0
Arsenal	Total		20	0	2	0	1	0	14	0	1	0	38	0
Career total			146	7	15	0	28	2	14	0	1	0	204	9

=== International ===
As of match played 7 March 2026

Appearances and goals by national team and year
National team	Year	Apps	Goals
Jamaica	2024	1	0
Jamaica	Total	1	0
England	2025	3	0
England	2026	2	0
England	Total	5	0
Career total		6	0

== Honours ==
Liverpool

- FA Women's Championship: 2021–22

Arsenal

- FIFA Women's Champions Cup: 2026

England U20

- FIFA U-20 Women's World Cup third place: 2018
