= Ceri Holland =

Wales international footballer

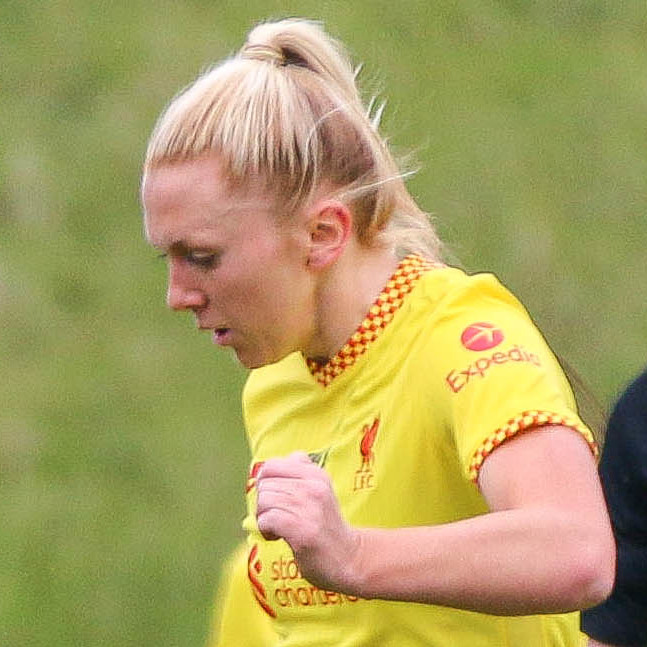
- Holland playing for Liverpool in 2022

Personal information
- Full name: Ceri Anwen Holland
- Date of birth: 12 December 1997 (age 28)
- Place of birth: Skipton, North Yorkshire, England
- Position: Midfielder

Team information
- Current team: Liverpool
- Number: 18

Youth career
- Silsden Juniors A.F.C
- 2007–2011: Leeds United
- 2011–2014: Blackburn Rovers
- 2014–2017: Manchester City

College career
Years	Team	Apps	(Gls)
2017–2020	Kansas Jayhawks	73	(12)

Senior career*
Years	Team	Apps	(Gls)
2021–	Liverpool	108	(12)

International career^{‡}
2015	Wales U19	3	(2)
2021–	Wales	54	(7)
- * Club domestic league appearances and goals as of 01:44, 14 September 2026 (UTC) ‡ National team caps and goals as of 03:57, 11 August 2026 (UTC)

Ceri Anwen Holland (Welsh: [ˈkɛrɪ] or [ˈkeːrɪ]; (Note: The latter pronunciation is a variant used in South Wales.) born 12 December 1997) is a Welsh professional footballer who plays as a midfielder for Women's Super League club Liverpool and the Wales national team.

== Early life ==
Ceri Holland was born on 12 December 1997 in Skipton, North Yorkshire to Andrew and Mair Holland. Her father was originally from Bury and her mother was from Llanrhaeadr-ym-Mochnant, Wales. She began playing football at the age of four for the local boys’ team, Silsden Juniors. In 2007, at age 10, she joined Leeds United Centre of Excellence. She would went on to move to the Blackburn Rovers youth academy and eventually joined Manchester City's reserve team before embarking on her college career at University of Kansas.

== Club career ==
Holland joined Liverpool in January 2021, their first season in the Women's Championship. She was part of the squad that won the league title in the 2021-22 season, earning promotion to the Women's Super League.

In the 2023–24 season in the away game against Brighton, Holland scored in the 1–0 victory.

On 24 June 2025, it was announced that Holland had signed a new contract, extending her time at Liverpool. She scored twice in Liverpool's 3–2 derby win over Everton in the WSL on 28 March 2026, the first of her goals coming from the penalty spot following a handball in the box by Inma Gabarro.

== International career ==
Born in England, Holland was eligible to represent Wales through her mother, Mair, who was from Llanrhaeadr-ym-Mochnant, Wales.

In October 2024, head coach Rhian Wilkinson named Holland as one of two vice-captains of the senior team, alongside Hayley Ladd.

On 19 June 2025, it was announced that Holland was called up as part of the Welsh squad for the 2025 UEFA Women's Euro, Cymru's first time at a major tournament in the women's game.

== Career statistics ==
=== Club ===
As of match played 13 September 2026

Appearances and goals by club, season and competition
Club	Season	League			FA cup		League cup		Total	
Club	Season	Division	Apps	Goals	Apps	Goals	Apps	Goals	Apps	Goals
Liverpool	2020–21	Women's Championship	7	3	1	0	0	0	8	3
Liverpool	2021–22	Women's Championship	21	0	2	0	3	0	26	0
Liverpool	2022–23	Women's Super League	19	4	1	1	5	0	25	5
Liverpool	2023–24	Women's Super League	19	2	2	0	3	0	24	2
Liverpool	2024–25	Women's Super League	19	0	2	0	2	0	23	0
Liverpool	2025–26	Women's Super League	21	3	3	0	3	1	27	4
Liverpool	2026–27	Women's Super League	2	0	0	0	0	0	2	0
Career total			108	12	11	1	16	1	135	14

=== International ===
As of matches played 9 June 2026

Appearances and goals by national team and year
National team	Year	Apps	Goals
Wales	2021	7	3
Wales	2022	13	1
Wales	2023	8	2
Wales	2024	10	1
Wales	2025	12	1
Wales	2026	4	0
Total		54	7

List of international goals scored by Ceri Holland
No.	Date	Venue	Opponent	Score	Result	Competition
1	18 September 2021	Parc y Scarlets, Llanelli, Wales	Kazakhstan	6–0	6–0	2023 FIFA Women's World Cup qualification
2	27 November 2021	Parc y Scarlets, Llanelli, Wales	Greece	3–0	5–0	2023 FIFA Women's World Cup qualification
3	27 November 2021	Parc y Scarlets, Llanelli, Wales	Greece	4–0	5–0	2023 FIFA Women's World Cup qualification
4	21 February 2023	Pinatar Arena, San Pedro del Pinatar, Spain	Scotland	1–1	1–1	2023 Pinatar Cup
5	27 October 2023	Rhein-Neckar-Arena, Sinsheim, Germany	Germany	1–1	5–1	2023–24 UEFA Women's Nations League
6	30 October 2024	Cardiff City Stadium, Cardiff, Wales	Slovakia	2–0	2–0	UEFA Women's Euro 2025 qualifying play-offs
7	4 April 2025	Cardiff City Stadium, Cardiff, Wales	Denmark	1–1	1–2	2025 Nations League
