= Leighanne Robe =

English footballer

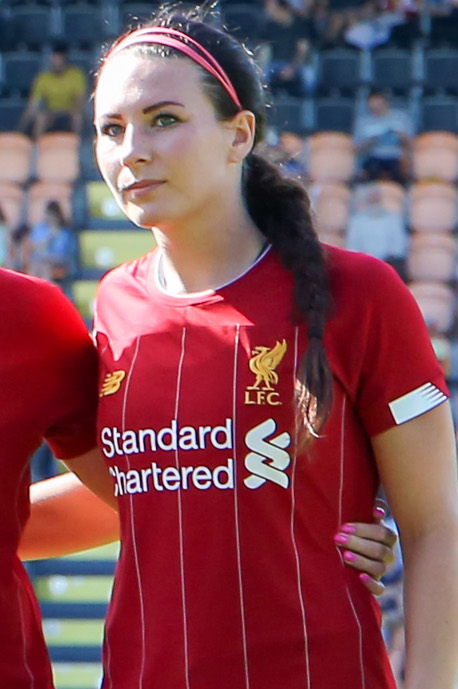
- Robe Playing for Liverpool in 2019

Personal information
- Date of birth: 26 December 1993 (age 32)
- Place of birth: Cambridge, England
- Height: 1.65 m (5 ft 5 in)
- Position: Defender

Youth career
- 2009–2014: Arsenal

Senior career*
Years	Team	Apps	(Gls)
2014–2015	Watford	16	(0)
2016–2018	Millwall Lionesses	42	(2)
2018–2023	Liverpool	72	(0)
2023–2025	Al-Ittihad	12	(4)
2025–2026	Cruz Azul	33	(1)
2026	UNAM	2	(0)
2026–	Charlton Athletic	0	(0)
- * Club domestic league appearances and goals as of 1 February 2026 ‡ National team caps and goals as of 13:46, 12 May 2019 (UTC)

Leighanne Robe (born 26 December 1993) is an English professional footballer who plays as a defender for Women's Super League club Charlton Athletic.

== Career ==
Robe joined a boys' football team as a seven-year-old, represented Cambridge City girls, and progressed to playing for Arsenal's youth system. A versatile defender, she joined Watford of the FA WSL 2 in August 2014.

Millwall Lionesses signed Robe for the 2016 FA WSL 2 season. She played in every match and was given a contract extension for the FA WSL Spring Series. She made 42 league appearances, scoring twice for the Lionesses. In June 2018 Robe transferred to Liverpool, whose manager Neil Redfearn said: "Leighanne is a quality, tough-tackling defender who is also a real leader." On the 30th of January 2022, Robe scored her first goals for Liverpool on her 81st appearance by scoring a hat-trick in a FA Cup tie against Lincoln City FC. She was released by Liverpool at the end of the 2022–23 WSL season.

On 6 October 2023, Robe signed for Saudi Premier League club Al-Ittihad.

In July 2025, Robe signed for Cruz Azul.

In June 2026, Robe signed for UNAM.

On 5 September 2026, Robe was announced at Charlton Athletic.

== Career statistics ==
As of match played 28 April 2024

Appearances and goals by club, season and competition
Club	Season	League			National cup		League cup		Total	
Club	Season	Division	Apps	Goals	Apps	Goals	Apps	Goals	Apps	Goals
Watford	2015	WSL 2	16	0	3	0	5	0	24	0
Millwall	2016	WSL 2	18	1	3	0	1	0	22	1
Millwall	2017	WSL 2	7	0	3	0	0	0	10	0
Millwall	2017–18	WSL 2	17	1	2	0	2	0	23	1
Millwall	Total		42	2	8	0	3	0	53	2
Liverpool	2018–19	WSL	19	0	2	0	4	0	25	0
Liverpool	2019–20	WSL	14	0	2	0	5	0	21	0
Liverpool	2020–21	Championship	13	0	1	0	3	0	17	0
Liverpool	2021–22	Championship	15	0	3	3	5	0	23	3
Liverpool	2022–23	WSL	11	0	1	0	5	0	17	0
Liverpool	Total		72	0	9	3	22	0	103	3
Al-Ittihad Club	2023–24	SWPL	12	4	3	1	0	0	15	5
Career total			142	6	23	4	30	0	195	10

== Honours ==
Liverpool

- FA Women's Championship: 2021–2022:
