= Niamh Fahey =

Irish footballer (born 1987)

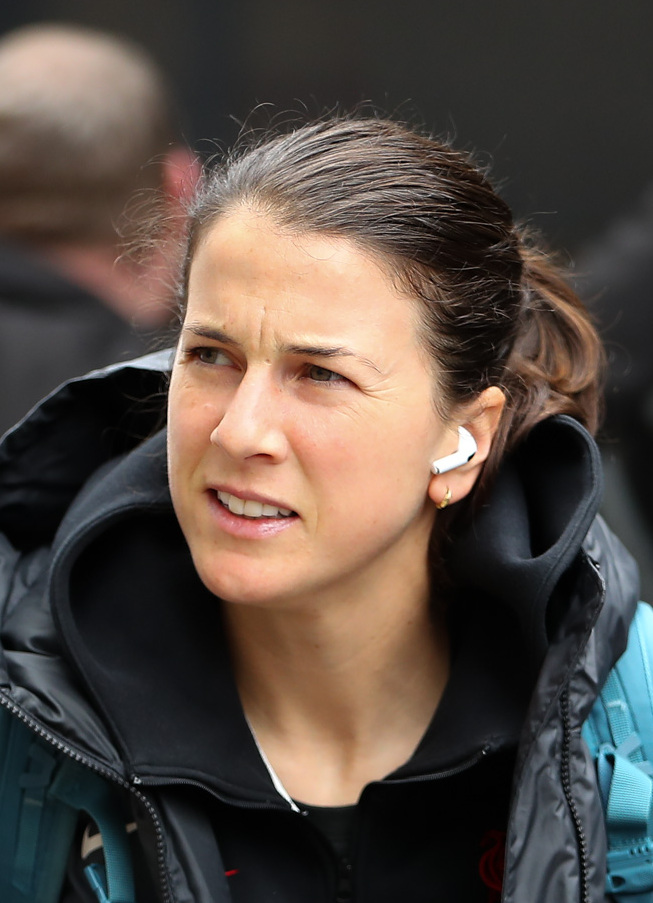
- Fahey with Liverpool in 2024

Personal information
- Date of birth: 13 October 1987 (age 39)
- Place of birth: Galway, Ireland
- Height: 1.70 m (5 ft 7 in)
- Positions: Defensive midfielder; centre-back

Youth career
- Moycullen
- Salthill Devon

Senior career*
Years	Team	Apps	(Gls)
2000–2008	Salthill Devon		
2007	→ Galway (loan)		
2008–2014	Arsenal	73	(2)
2015–2017	Chelsea	28	(0)
2017–2018	Bordeaux	17	(0)
2018–2025	Liverpool	92	(5)
Total		210+	(7+)

International career^{‡}
2007–2025	Republic of Ireland	114	(1)
- * Club domestic league appearances and goals as of 10:04, 11 February 2025 (UTC) ‡ National team caps and goals as of 12 August 2023

Niamh Fahey (/niːv ˈfæhi/ neev FA-hee; born 13 October 1987) is an Irish former professional footballer who played as a defensive midfielder or centre-back. Beginning her career with Salthill Devon, she moved to Arsenal in 2008, where she spent six seasons before moving to Chelsea in 2014. After a spell at Bordeaux, Fahey signed for Liverpool in 2018. Fahey would go on to become club captain in 2020, before retiring at the club in 2025. From 2007 to 2025, she also represented the Republic of Ireland national team. She has also won national cups playing Gaelic football with Galway Ladies Football. Niamh is the sister of Galway's 2001 All-Ireland-winning Gaelic footballers Gary Fahey, and Richie Fahey.

== Club career ==
Fahey began playing football with Moycullen as her hometown, Killanin, did not have a soccer club at the time. She then moved to Salthill Devon and progressed through the ranks alongside future international teammate Méabh De Búrca. Both players helped Galway win the FAI Women's Cup in 2007. In the final against Raheny United, Fahey scored the winning penalty and also subdued the attacking threat of Raheny's Olivia O'Toole, in what RTÉ described as "a splendid individual display."

She joined Arsenal Ladies in August 2008. In her first season with the Gunners Fahey made 18 appearances, mostly at left full–back, as the club won a domestic treble.

On 19 December 2014, Fahey signed for Chelsea L.F.C.

=== Liverpool ===
In the summer of 2018, Fahey signed for her lifelong supported club Liverpool where she has been the club captain since 2020. She stayed with the club after they were relegated on a points by points basis in the summer of 2020.

In the 2021–22 FA Women's Championship season, Fahey led Liverpool to the FA Women's Championship title winning sixteen out of their twenty two league games, earning their promotion back to the FA Women's Super League. She missed only three games and also scoring two goals during the entirety of the season.

After Liverpool finished seventh on their return to the top flight, Fahey then signed a contract extension ahead of the 2023–24 season.

On 2 May 2025, Fahey announced her retirement from football at the end of the 2024–25 season.

== Gaelic football ==
Fahey won the All-Ireland Ladies Football Championship in 2004 with Galway defeating Dublin by 3–11 to 0–9 She also played in the 2005 final for Galway losing to Cork by 1–11 to 0–08. In 2012 she also won the All-Ireland Ladies Intermediate Club Football Championship with London club Parnells defeating Cahir of Tipperary by 2–14 to 1–2.

== International career ==
Fahey has won over 100 caps for the Republic of Ireland, having previously represented her country at Under-17 and Under-19 level. In March 2007, Fahey made her senior debut for Ireland in a 1–1 draw with Portugal in the opening match of the Algarve Cup. After becoming a regular in the team, Fahey was named FAI Women's Senior International Player of the Year in 2008, 2009 and 2011.

In April 2013, Fahey suffered an anterior cruciate ligament injury while playing for Arsenal. The 30 minutes she played for Ireland against the Basque Country in May 2014 was her first game back.

On 16 February 2022, she played her 100th match for Republic of Ireland in a 2–1 win over Poland in the 2022 Pinatar Cup. She scored her first ever goal for Ireland on the occasion of her 104th cap, in a 9–0 2023 FIFA Women's World Cup qualification – UEFA Group A win over Georgia in Gori on 27 June 2022.

== Post-playing career ==
In October 2025, Liverpool announced that Fahey had returned to the club as technical co-ordinator for the women's side.

== Personal life ==
Fahey grew up a lifelong Liverpool fan and idolised Michael Owen.

‘I was out in the garden, pretending to be Michael Owen. Most of my family are Liverpool supporters, so it was only natural for me.’

During her career, she completed her degree and masters in pharmacology, as well as completing a master's degree in business administration (MBA) at Liverpool John Moores University in July 2025. Fahey has also started some of her coaching badges.

== Career statistics ==
=== Club ===
As of match played 15 December 2024

Some entries may be missing or incomplete due to lack of historical statistics.

Appearances and goals by club, season and competition
Club	Season	League			National cup (Note: Includes Women's FA Cup, Coupe de France féminine)		League cup (Note: Includes WSL Cup/Women's League Cup, Women's National League Cup)		Europe (Note: Includes UEFA Women's Champions League)		Total	
Club	Season	Division	Apps	Goals	Apps	Goals	Apps	Goals	Apps	Goals	Apps	Goals
Arsenal	2008–09	Women's Premier League	16	2	1	0	3	0	—		20	2
Arsenal	2009–10	Women's Premier League	21	0	1	0	3	0	6	0	31	0
Arsenal	2011	Women's Super League	13	0	1	0	0	0	7	0	21	0
Arsenal	2012	Women's Super League	12	0	0	0	3	0	8	0	23	0
Arsenal	2013	Women's Super League	0	0	3	0	1	0	6	1	10	1
Arsenal	2014	Women's Super League	11	0	1	0	5	1	—		17	1
Arsenal	Total		73	2	7	0	15	1	27	1	122	4
Chelsea	2015	Women's Super League	14	0	2	0	3	0	—		19	0
Chelsea	2016	Women's Super League	12	0	2	0	1	0	4	0	19	0
Chelsea	2017	Women's Super League	2	0	0	0	0	0	2	0	4	0
Chelsea	Total		28	0	4	0	4	0	6	0	42	0
Bordeaux	2017–18	D1 Féminine	17	0	0	0	—		—		17	0
Liverpool	2018–19	Women's Super League	17	0	3	0	3	1	—		23	1
Liverpool	2019–20	Women's Super League	13	0	2	1	3	0	—		18	1
Liverpool	2020–21	Women's Championship	19	3	1	0	3	0	—		23	3
Liverpool	2021–22	Women's Championship	19	2	2	0	3	0	—		24	2
Liverpool	2022–23	Women's Super League	12	0	1	0	3	0	—		16	0
Liverpool	2023–24	Women's Super League	8	0	2	0	1	0	—		11	0
Liverpool	2024–25	Women's Super League	4	0	0	0	3	0	—		6	0
Liverpool	Total		92	5	11	1	19	1	—		122	7
Career total			210	7	22	1	38	2	33	1	303	11

=== International ===
Appearances and goals by national team and year
National team	Year	Apps	Goals
Republic of Ireland	2007	7	0
Republic of Ireland	2008	15	0
Republic of Ireland	2009	5	0
Republic of Ireland	2010	6	0
Republic of Ireland	2011	4	0
Republic of Ireland	2012	10	0
Republic of Ireland	2014	5	0
Republic of Ireland	2015	9	0
Republic of Ireland	2016	8	0
Republic of Ireland	2017	4	0
Republic of Ireland	2018	7	0
Republic of Ireland	2019	8	0
Republic of Ireland	2020	4	0
Republic of Ireland	2021	7	0
Republic of Ireland	2022	7	1
Total		106	1

Scores and results list Republic of Ireland's goals first. Score column indicates score after each Fahey goal. Updated as of 5 May 2023.

International goals scored by Niamh Fahey
No.	Cap	Date	Venue	Opponent	Score	Result	Competition	Ref.
1	104	27 June 2022	Tengiz Burjanadze Stadium, Gori	Georgia	2–0	9–0	2023 FIFA Women's World Cup Qual.	

== Honours ==
- FA WSL: 3

2011, 2012 2015 FA WSL

- FA Women's Premier League National Division: 2

2008–09, 2009–10

- FA Women's Championship:1

2021–22

- FA Women's Cup: 5

2008–09, 2010–11, 2012–13, 2013–14, 2014–2015

- FA WSL Cup: 3

2011, 2012, 2013

- FA Women's Premier League Cup: 2

2008–09, 2014–15

- All-Ireland Senior Ladies' Football Championship: 1

2004

- All-Ireland Ladies' Club Football Championship: 1

2012
