= 2024–25 Liverpool F.C. Women season =

36th season in existence of Liverpool FC Women

Liverpool
2024–25 season
- Owner: Fenway Sports Group
- Chairman: Tom Werner
- Head coach: Matt Beard (until 27 February); Amber Whiteley (interim, from 27 February)
- Stadium: Totally Wicked Stadium
- Super League: 7th
- FA Cup: Semi-finals
- League Cup: Group stage
- Top goalscorer: League: Olivia Smith (7); All: Olivia Smith (9)
- Biggest win: 6–1 v Newcastle United (A) (League Cup, 24 November 2024); 5–0 v West Ham United (A) (FA Cup, 29 January 2025)
- Biggest defeat: 0–4 v Manchester United (A) (WSL, 7 December 2024); 0–4 v Manchester City (A) (WSL, 16 February 2025); 0–4 v Arsenal (A) (WSL, 22 March 2025)
Home colours	Away colours	Third colours

The 2024–25 season is Liverpool F.C. Women's 36th season of competitive football and third consecutive season back in the Women's Super League, the highest level of the football pyramid. Along with competing in the WSL, the club will contest two domestic cup competitions: the FA Cup and the League Cup.

On 3 May 2024, Liverpool announced that from this season onwards, their home games will be played at the Totally Wicked Stadium.

On 27 February 2025, the club announced that manager Matt Beard had left his position with immediate effect. Assistant manager Amber Whiteley assumed the role on an interim basis.

== Squad ==
No.	Player	Nationality	Date of birth (age)	Signed from	Apps	Goals	Assists
Goalkeepers
1	Rachael Laws	(England)	5 November 1990 (aged 34)	(England) Reading	86	0	0
16	Teagan Micah	(Australia)	20 October 1997 (aged 27)	(Sweden) FC Rosengård	10	0	0
22	Faye Kirby	(England)	5 April 2004 (aged 21)	(England) Everton	5	0	0
Defenders
2	Lucy Parry	(England)	7 May 2004 (aged 21)	—N/a	19	0	0
3	Gemma Evans	(Wales)	1 August 1996 (aged 28)	(England) Manchester United	0	0	0
4	Grace Fisk	(England)	5 January 1998 (aged 27)	(England) West Ham United	29	1	2
5	Niamh Fahey (captain)	(Republic of Ireland)	13 October 1987 (aged 37)	(France) Bordeaux	117	7	2
6	Jasmine Matthews	(England)	24 March 1993 (aged 32)	(England) Bristol City	53	4	3
12	Taylor Hinds (vice-captain)	(Jamaica)	25 April 1999 (aged 26)	(England) Everton	103	6	5
17	Jenna Clark	(Scotland)	29 September 2001 (aged 23)	(Scotland) Glasgow City	28	0	0
23	Gemma Bonner	(England)	13 July 1991 (aged 33)	(United States) Racing Louisville	148	13	3
29	Alejandra Bernabé	(Spain)	12 November 2001 (aged 23)	(England) Chelsea (loan)	0	0	0
34	Hannah Silcock	(England)	18 September 2004 (aged 20)	—N/a	9	0	0
Midfielders
8	Fūka Nagano	(Japan)	9 March 1999 (aged 26)	(United States) North Carolina Courage	38	0	0
14	Marie Höbinger	(Austria)	1 July 2001 (aged 23)	(Switzerland) FC Zürich	29	5	4
15	Sofie Lundgaard	(Denmark)	29 May 2002 (aged 23)	(Denmark) Fortuna Hjørring	32	0	0
18	Ceri Holland	(Wales)	12 December 1997 (aged 27)	(United States) Kansas Jayhawks	83	10	4
19	Júlia Bartel	(Spain)	18 May 2004 (aged 21)	(England) Chelsea (loan)	0	0	0
24	Sam Kerr	(Scotland)	17 April 1999 (aged 26)	(Germany) Bayern Munich (loan)	0	0	0
36	Zara Shaw	(England)	6 June 2007 (aged 18)	—N/a	1	0	0
Forwards
7	Cornelia Kapocs	(Sweden)	13 July 2000 (aged 24)	(Sweden) Linköping	0	0	0
9	Leanne Kiernan	(Republic of Ireland)	27 April 1999 (aged 26)	(England) West Ham United	47	19	2
10	Sophie Román Haug	(Norway)	4 June 1999 (aged 26)	(Italy) Roma	24	9	4
11	Olivia Smith	(Canada)	5 August 2004 (aged 20)	(Portugal) Sporting CP	0	0	0
13	Mia Enderby	(England)	31 May 2005 (aged 20)	(England) Sheffield United	20	1	2
20	Yana Daniëls	(Belgium)	8 May 1992 (aged 33)	(England) Bristol City	85	6	5

== Transfers ==
=== Transfers in ===
Date	Position	Nationality	Name	From	Ref.
2 July 2024	MF	(Canada)	Olivia Smith	(Portugal) Sporting CP	
15 August 2024	FW	(Sweden)	Cornelia Kapocs	(Sweden) Linköping	
16 August 2024	DF	(Wales)	Gemma Evans	(England) Manchester United	

=== Loans in ===
Date	Position	Nationality	Name	From	Until	Ref.
8 January 2025	MF	(Scotland)	Sam Kerr	(Germany) Bayern Munich	End of season	
9 January 2025	MF	(Spain)	Júlia Bartel	(England) Chelsea	End of season	
31 January 2025	DF	(Spain)	Alejandra Bernabé	(England) Chelsea	End of season	

=== Transfers out ===
Date	Position	Nationality	Name	To	Ref.
18 May 2024	DF	(Finland)	Emma Koivisto	(Italy) AC Milan	
18 May 2024	FW	(England)	Melissa Lawley	(England) Everton	
18 May 2024	MF	(Netherlands)	Shanice van de Sanden	(Mexico) Pachuca	
18 May 2024	MF	(England)	Miri Taylor	(England) Aston Villa	
4 June 2024	FW	(England)	Natasha Flint	(United States) Tampa Bay Sun	
1 July 2024	MF	(England)	Mia Leath	(United States) UAB Blazers	
1 July 2024	MF	(England)	Alice Mottershead	(United States) Florida Tech Panthers	
1 July 2024	DF	(England)	Ava Pickard	(United States) Hofstra Pride	
1 July 2024	DF	(Wales)	Bethan Thomas	(United States) Niagara Purple Eagles	
1 August 2024	MF	(England)	Missy Bo Kearns	(England) Aston Villa	
9 August 2024	FW	(England)	Aleesha Collins	(England) Liverpool Feds	
9 August 2024	MF	(England)	Holly McEvoy	(Scotland) Aberdeen	

=== Contract extensions ===
Date	Position	Nationality	Name	Contract until	Ref.
7 August 2024	DF	(England)	Lucy Parry	Undisclosed	
8 August 2024	GK	(England)	Rachael Laws	Undisclosed	
9 September 2024	FW	(Republic of Ireland)	Leanne Kiernan	Undisclosed	
10 September 2024	DF	(Republic of Ireland)	Niamh Fahey	Undisclosed	
20 September 2024	MF	(Denmark)	Sofie Lundgaard	Undisclosed	
16 January 2025	MF	(Austria)	Marie Höbinger	Undisclosed	
21 March 2025	DF	(Scotland)	Jenna Clark	Undisclosed	
4 April 2025	DF	(England)	Grace Fisk	Undisclosed	

=== Transfer summary ===
Undisclosed fees are not included in the transfer totals.

Expenditure ▼

Summer: £215,000

Winter: £0

Total expenditure: £215,000

Income ▲

Summer: £0

Winter: £0

Total income: £0

Net totals

Summer: ▼£215,000

Winter: ▲£0

Total: ▼£215,000

== Competitions ==
=== Overall record ===
Competition	First match	Last match	Starting round	Record							
Competition	First match	Last match	Starting round	Pld	W	D	L	GF	GA	GD	Win %
Women's Super League	22 September 2024	25 May 2025	Matchday 1	22	7	4	11	22	37	−15	31.82
Women's FA Cup	29 January 2025	12 April 2025	Fourth round	4	3	0	1	9	2	+7	75.00
FA Women's League Cup	2 October 2024	11 December 2024	Group stage	3	2	0	1	10	3	+7	66.67
Total				29	12	4	13	41	42	−1	41.38

Last updated: 10 May 2025
Source: Soccerway

=== Women's Super League ===
==== League table ====
Pos	Team	Pld	W	D	L	GF	GA	GD	Pts
5	Brighton & Hove Albion	22	8	4	10	35	41	−6	28
6	Aston Villa	22	7	4	11	32	44	−12	25
7	Liverpool	22	7	4	11	22	37	−15	25
8	Everton	22	6	6	10	24	32	−8	24
9	West Ham United	22	6	5	11	36	41	−5	23

Source: The Football Association
Rules for classification: 1) Points; 2) Goal difference; 3) Number of goals scored.

==== Results summary ====
Overall								Home						Away					
Pld	W	D	L	GF	GA	GD	Pts	W	D	L	GF	GA	GD	W	D	L	GF	GA	GD
22	7	4	11	22	37	−15	25	3	3	5	12	16	−4	4	1	6	10	21	−11

Last updated: 10 May 2025.
Source: Soccerway

==== Results by round ====
Round	1	2	3	4	5	6	7	8	9	10	11	12	13	14	15	16	17	18	19	20	21	22
Ground	H	A	A	H	H	A	H	A	A	H	H	A	H	A	A	H	A	H	A	H	H	A
Result	D	D	W	L	D	W	L	L	L	L	W	L	W	L	W	W	L	L	W	D	L	L
Position	8	7	5	5	6	6	6	6	7	8	7	7	7	7	6	6	6	6	5	6	6	7
Points	1	2	5	5	6	9	9	9	9	9	12	12	15	15	18	21	21	21	24	25	25	25

Source: Women's Super League
A = Away; H = Home; W = Win; D = Draw; L = Loss; P = Postponed

==== Matches ====
The league fixtures were released on 22 July 2024.

Win Draw Loss Fixtures

22 September 2024 1	Liverpool	1–1	Leicester City	St Helens
14:00 BST	Haug 45'; Nagano (yellow card) 80'	Report	Rantala 53'; Kop (yellow card) 88'; Nevin (yellow card) 90+2'	Stadium: Totally Wicked Stadium; Attendance: 3,058; Referee: Adewunmi Soneye

29 September 2024 2	West Ham United	1–1	Liverpool	Dagenham
15:00 BST	Gorry (yellow card) 27'; Brynjarsdóttir (yellow card) 56'; Ueki 85'	Report	Smith 7'; Hinds (yellow card) 19'; Laws (yellow card) 84'	Stadium: Victoria Road; Attendance: 1,799; Referee: Abigail Byrne

6 October 2024 3	Tottenham Hotspur	2–3	Liverpool	Leyton
14:15 BST	Hinds 54' (o.g.); Hunt (yellow card) 73', (goal) 83'; Thomas (yellow card) 77'	Report	Kapocs 10'; Bonner (yellow card) 70'; Höbinger 75', 90+5' (pen.); Clark (yellow card) 86'	Stadium: Brisbane Road; Attendance: 2,206; Referee: Kirsty Dowie

13 October 2024 4	Liverpool	1–2	Manchester City	Liverpool
15:00 BST	Smith 41'; Höbinger (yellow card) 65'	Report	Shaw 58', 90+2', (yellow card) 90+8'	Stadium: Anfield; Attendance: 17,484; Referee: Stacey Fullicks

20 October 2024 5	Liverpool	1–1	Crystal Palace	St Helens
14:00 BST	Kapocs 37'; Smith (yellow card) 52'	Report	Stengel 14'; Green (yellow card) 90+2'	Stadium: Totally Wicked Stadium; Attendance: 3,007; Referee: Amy Fearn

3 November 2024 6	Aston Villa	1–2	Liverpool	Birmingham
16:30 GMT	Nunes 49'; Taylor (yellow card) 65'	Report	Hinds 26', 43'; Matthews (yellow card) 37'; Parry (yellow card) 88'; Laws (yellow card) 90+4'; Holland (yellow card) 90+7'	Stadium: Villa Park; Attendance: 3,213; Referee: Phoebe Cross

10 November 2024 7	Liverpool	0–3	Chelsea	St Helens
12:30 GMT	Evans (yellow card) 34'; Smith (yellow card) 45'	Report	Ramírez 37'; Reiten 42'; Cuthbert (yellow card) 73'; Nüsken (yellow card) 86'; Beever-Jones 90'	Stadium: Totally Wicked Stadium; Attendance: 4,514; Referee: Lisa Benn

17 November 2024 8	Everton	1–0	Liverpool	Liverpool
15:00 GMT	Snoeijs 41' (pen.)	Report		Stadium: Goodison Park; Attendance: 9,823; Referee: Abigail Byrne

8 December 2024 9	Manchester United	4–0	Liverpool	Leigh
12:00 GMT	Terland 33'; Galton 34'; Janssen 59'; Le Tissier (yellow card) 70'; Malard 81'; Awujo (yellow card) 89'	Report	Matthews (yellow card) 6'	Stadium: Leigh Sports Village; Attendance: 4,782; Referee: Stacey Fullicks

15 December 2024 10	Liverpool	0–1	Arsenal	St Helens
14:30 GMT	Hinds (yellow card) 62'	Report	Russo 20'; Caldentey (penalty missed) 27', (yellow card) 82'	Stadium: Totally Wicked Stadium; Attendance: 5,786; Referee: Melissa Burgin

17 January 2025 11	Liverpool	2–1	Brighton & Hove Albion	St Helens
19:00 GMT	Smith 31', (yellow card) 35'; Carabalí 82' (o.g.); Kiernan (yellow card) 90+5'	Report	Parris 66'; Pattinson (yellow card) 80'; Haley (yellow card) 90+7'	Stadium: Totally Wicked Stadium; Referee: Kirsty Dowle

26 January 2025 12	Leicester City	2–1	Liverpool	Leicester
15:00 GMT	Cayman 17'; Goodwin 40'; Las (yellow card) 69'; Mace (yellow card) 74'; Cain (yellow card) 76'	Report	Smith 3', (yellow card) 76'; Bonner (yellow card) 44'	Stadium: King Power Stadium; Attendance: 2,964; Referee: Abigail Byrne

2 February 2025 13	Liverpool	1–0	West Ham United	St Helens
14:00 GMT	Fisk (yellow card) 18'; Kiernan 33'; Smith (yellow card) 71'	Report	Siren (yellow card) 39'	Stadium: Totally Wicked Stadium; Attendance: 3,166; Referee: Amy Fearn

16 February 2025 14	Manchester City	4–0	Liverpool	Manchester
18:45 GMT	Shaw 30', 43'; Roord 60'; Prior 77'	Report	Holland (yellow card) 78'	Stadium: Academy Stadium; Referee: Kirsty Dowle

2 March 2025 15	Crystal Palace	0–1	Liverpool	Sutton
14:00 GMT	Woodham (yellow card) 51'; Potter (yellow card) 88'	Report	Matthews 10'; Smith (yellow card) 64'	Stadium: Gander Green Lane; Attendance: 1,386; Referee: Ryan Atkin

14 March 2025 16	Liverpool	3–1	Manchester United	Liverpool
19:15 GMT	Smith 42', 67' (pen.); Nagano 45+2'	Report	Le Tissier 89'	Stadium: Anfield; Attendance: 15,596; Referee: Amy Fearn

22 March 2025 17	Arsenal	4–0	Liverpool	Holloway
17:30 GMT	Foord 28'; Matthews 29', 69' (o.g.); Caldentey 44'; McCabe (yellow card) 45+3'	Report	Kiernan (yellow card) 90+4'	Stadium: Emirates Stadium; Attendance: 35,628; Referee: Stacey Fullicks

30 March 2025 18	Liverpool	1–2	Aston Villa	St Helens
14:00 BST	Höbinger 57' (pen.); Fisk (yellow card) 90+3'	Report	Taylor (yellow card) 45+1'; Hanson 68'; Clark 87' (o.g.); Nunes (yellow card) 90+9'	Stadium: Totally Wicked Stadium; Attendance: 3,082; Referee: Megan Wilson

19 April 2025 19	Brighton & Hove Albion	1–2	Liverpool	Brighton and Hove
12:30 BST	Pattinson (yellow card) 45+2'; Agyemang 48'; Parris (yellow card) 65'; Kirby (yellow card) 73'	Report	Smith 2'; Kiernan 43'; Kapocs (yellow card) 57'; Laws (yellow card) 88'; Hinds (yellow card) 90+6'	Stadium: Falmer Stadium; Attendance: 4,566; Referee: Lisa Benn
Note: Fixture was initially scheduled for 20 April at the Broadfield Stadium, but was moved to be played at the Falmer Stadium.

27 April 2025 20	Liverpool	2–2	Tottenham Hotspur	St Helens
14:00 BST	Haug 12', 51'; Hinds (yellow card) 77'	Report	Laws 25' (o.g.); Hunt 31'; Rybrink (yellow card) 88'	Stadium: Totally Wicked Stadium; Attendance: 3,213; Referee: Phoebe Cross

4 May 2025 21	Liverpool	0–2	Everton	Liverpool
12:00 BST	Fisk (yellow card) 79'	Report	Snoeijs 7'; S. Holmgaard (yellow card) 41' (yellow-red card) 81'; K. Holmgaard 69'; Madsen (yellow card) 89'	Stadium: Anfield; Attendance: 15,376; Referee: Lisa Benn

10 May 2025 22	Chelsea	1–0	Liverpool	Fulham
12:30 BST	Bronze (yellow card) 62'; Beever-Jones 90+1'	Report	Höbinger (yellow card) 40'	Stadium: Stamford Bridge; Attendance: 21,327; Referee: Phoebe Cross

=== Women's FA Cup ===
As a Women's Super League side, Liverpool entered the FA Cup in the fourth round.

29 January 2025 Fourth round	West Ham United	0–5	Liverpool	Dagenham
19:45 GMT	Tysiak (red card) 38'	Report	Sáez 3' (o.g.); Kiernan 18'; Fisk 48'; Parry 66'; Kerr 70'	Stadium: Victoria Road; Attendance: 859; Referee: Kirsty Dowle
Note: This match, initially scheduled for a 14:00 kick-off on 12 January 2025, was rescheduled due to a frozen pitch.

9 February 2025 Fifth round	Rugby Borough	0–2	Liverpool	Rugby
12:30 GMT		Report	Bernabé (yellow card) 39'; Höbinger 84'; Enderby 90+2'	Stadium: Kilsby Lane; Referee: Ella Broad

9 March 2025 Quarter-finals	Arsenal	0–1	Liverpool	Borehamwood
14:30 GMT	McCabe (yellow card) 54'	Report	Höbinger (yellow card) 18'; Matthews (yellow card) 39'; Bonner (yellow card) 45+4'; Van Domselaar 78' (o.g.)	Stadium: Meadow Park; Attendance: 3,148; Referee: Stacey Pearson

12 April 2025 Semi-finals	Chelsea	2–1	Liverpool	Kingston upon Thames
12:15 BST	Cuthbert 45+2'; Baltimore (yellow card) 77'; Beever-Jones 90+4'	Report	Smith 21'; Fisk (yellow card) 37'; Laws (yellow card) 74'	Stadium: Kingsmeadow; Referee: Kirsty Dowle

=== FA Women's League Cup ===
As a team not qualified for the UEFA Women's Champions League, Liverpool entered the League Cup at the group stage.

==== Group stage ====
Pos	Team	Pld	W	PW	PL	L	GF	GA	GD	Pts	Qualification	MUN	LIV	EVE	NUN
1	Manchester United	3	3	0	0	0	9	3	+6	9	Advanced to knock-out stage	—	2–0	–	5–3
2	Liverpool	3	2	0	0	1	10	3	+7	6		–	—	4–0	–
3	Everton	3	0	1	0	2	1	7	−6	2		0–2	–	—	–
4	Newcastle United	3	0	0	1	2	5	12	−7	1		–	1–6	1–1	—

Updated to match(es) played on 24 November 2024. Source: Women's League Cup
Rules for classification: 1) Points; 2) Goal difference; 3) Number of goals scored; 4) Number of wins; 5) Head-to-head record

Round	1	2	3
Ground	A	A	H
Result	L	W	W
Position	4	2	2
Points	0	3	6

Source: FA
A = Away; H = Home; W = Win; D = Draw; L = Loss

Win Draw Loss Fixtures

2 October 2024 1	Manchester United	2–0	Liverpool	Leigh
19:00 BST	Malard 9'; Williams 67'	Report	Fahey (yellow card) 64'; Evans (yellow card) 86'	Stadium: Leigh Sports Village; Attendance: 2,568; Referee: Elizabeth Simms

24 November 2024 2	Newcastle United	1–6	Liverpool	Newcastle upon Tyne
14:00 GMT	Andrews 88'	Report	Shaw 10'; Enderby 12', 55'; Smith 35'; Kapocs 45+1'; Daniëls (yellow card) 58'; Kiernan 90+3'	Stadium: Kingston Park; Attendance: 3,013; Referee: Hannah Gardner

11 December 2024 3	Liverpool	4–0	Everton	St Helens
18:00 GMT	Clark 28'; Enderby 58', 90'; Kapocs 83'	Report		Stadium: Totally Wicked Stadium; Attendance: 3,219; Referee: Adewunmi Soneye

== Statistics ==
As of match played 10 May 2025

=== Appearances and goals ===
Players with no appearances are not included on the list

No.	Pos	Nat	Player	Total		Super League		FA Cup		League Cup	
No.	Pos	Nat	Player	Apps	Goals	Apps	Goals	Apps	Goals	Apps	Goals
1	GK	(England) ENG	Rachael Laws	20	0	15+0	0	4+0	0	1+0	0
2	DF	(England) ENG	Lucy Parry	12	1	9+1	0	0+2	1	0+0	0
3	DF	(Wales) WAL	Gemma Evans	22	0	7+9	0	2+2	0	2+0	0
4	DF	(England) ENG	Grace Fisk	22	1	16+1	0	3+0	1	2+0	0
5	DF	(Republic of Ireland) IRL	Niamh Fahey	9	0	0+6	0	0+0	0	2+1	0
6	DF	(England) ENG	Jasmine Matthews	18	1	12+2	1	1+1	0	1+1	0
7	FW	(Sweden) SWE	Cornelia Kapocs	26	4	9+10	2	3+1	0	3+0	2
8	MF	(Japan) JPN	Fūka Nagano	26	1	18+3	1	2+0	0	2+1	0
9	FW	(Republic of Ireland) IRL	Leanne Kiernan	22	4	7+9	2	2+1	1	2+1	1
10	FW	(Norway) NOR	Sophie Román Haug	19	3	12+3	3	2+2	0	0+0	0
11	FW	(Canada) CAN	Olivia Smith	25	9	20+0	7	3+0	1	1+1	1
12	DF	(Jamaica) JAM	Taylor Hinds	29	2	22+0	2	4+0	0	1+2	0
13	FW	(England) ENG	Mia Enderby	22	5	4+13	0	0+2	1	2+1	4
14	MF	(Austria) AUT	Marie Höbinger	26	4	17+3	3	3+1	1	1+1	0
15	MF	(Denmark) DEN	Sofie Lundgaard	4	0	1+2	0	0+0	0	1+0	0
16	GK	(Australia) AUS	Teagan Micah	9	0	7+0	0	0+0	0	2+0	0
17	DF	(Scotland) SCO	Jenna Clark	23	1	13+7	0	2+0	0	1+0	1
18	MF	(Wales) WAL	Ceri Holland	23	0	18+1	0	2+0	0	1+1	0
19	MF	(Spain) ESP	Júlia Bartel	7	0	0+5	0	1+1	0	0+0	0
20	FW	(Belgium) BEL	Yana Daniëls	15	0	0+9	0	2+1	0	3+0	0
23	DF	(England) ENG	Gemma Bonner	24	0	17+2	0	3+0	0	0+2	0
24	MF	(Scotland) SCO	Sam Kerr	14	1	11+0	0	3+0	1	0+0	0
29	DF	(Spain) ESP	Alejandra Bernabé	4	0	2+1	0	1+0	0	0+0	0
34	DF	(England) ENG	Hannah Silcock	8	0	2+3	0	0+0	0	2+1	0
36	MF	(England) ENG	Zara Shaw	8	1	2+1	0	1+1	0	3+0	1
47	GK	(England) ENG	Eva Spencer	1	0	0+0	0	0+0	0	0+1	0
56	MF	(England) ENG	Maddy Duffy	1	0	0+1	0	0+0	0	0+0	0
57	DF	(Scotland) SCO	Neve McDonald	1	0	0+0	0	0+0	0	0+1	0
