= Jasmine Matthews =

English footballer

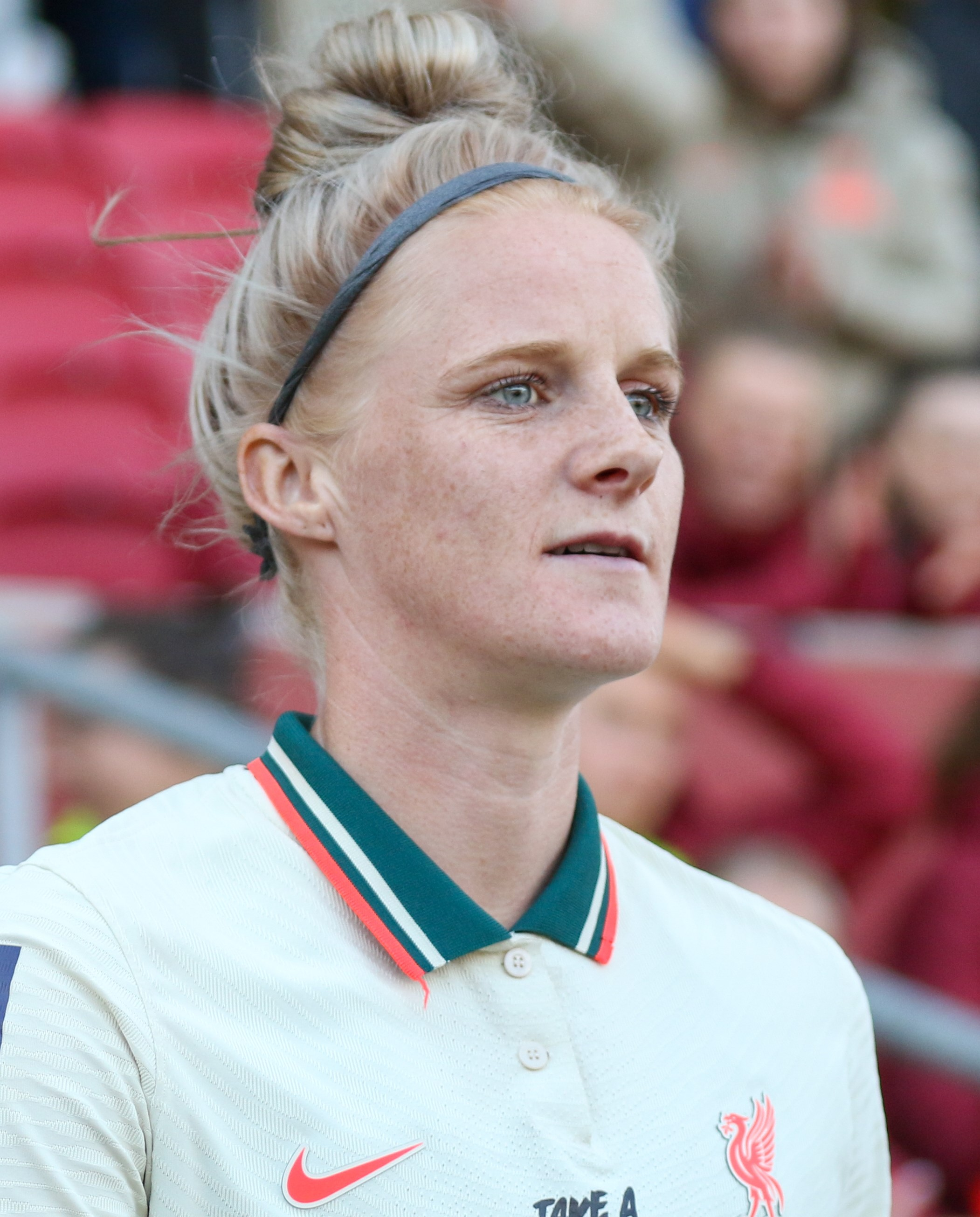
- Matthews with Liverpool in 2022

Personal information
- Full name: Jasmine Matthews
- Date of birth: 24 March 1993 (age 33)
- Place of birth: Truro, England
- Height: 1.71 m (5 ft 7 in)
- Positions: Defender; midfielder

Team information
- Current team: Wolverhampton Wanderers

Youth career
- Bristol City

Senior career*
Years	Team	Apps	(Gls)
2011–2018	Bristol City	63	(1)
2018–2019	Liverpool	10	(0)
2019–2021	Bristol City	23	(0)
2021–2025	Liverpool	65	(4)
2025–2026	Burnley	0+	(0+)
2026–	Wolverhampton Wanderers	0	(0)

International career^{‡}
- England U-17
2012	England U-19	7	(0)
2013	England U-23	7	(0)
- * Club domestic league appearances and goals as of 26 June 2025 ‡ National team caps and goals as of 24 October 2016

Jasmine Matthews (born 24 March 1993) is an English footballer who plays as a defender for Women's Super League 2 club Wolverhampton Wanderers.

She has previously played for Women's Super League clubs for Liverpool and Bristol City, as well as English under-17, under-19 and under-23 national teams.

== Club career ==
Matthews signed with Bristol City ahead of the 2011 FA WSL season. She made her debut for the senior squad during a match against Birmingham City L.F.C. on 14 April 2011. She made seven appearances during her first season with Bristol. The team finished in fifth place with a 4–6–3 record. During the 2012 FA WSL season, Matthews made seven appearances helping the team finish in fourth place with a 4–4–6 record.

In 2014, Matthews played for Bristol in the 2014–15 UEFA Women's Champions League. Bristol was the only English team to make the quarterfinals where they were eliminated by eventual winners Frankfurt. In 2015, she competed in the 2015–16 UEFA Women's Champions League for the second time.

In July 2018, Matthews signed for Liverpool.

After one season with Liverpool, it was announced on 12 July 2019 that Matthews was returning to Bristol City ahead of the 2019–20 season.

On 6 August 2025, Matthews joined Burnley on a permanent transfer.

On 24 June 2026, Matthews joined Wolves.

== International ==
Matthews has represented England on the under-17, under-19 and under-23 national teams.

== Personal life ==
Matthews is in a relationship with her teammate Yana Daniëls.

== Career statistics ==
=== Club ===
As of match played 9 February 2025

Some entries may be missing or incomplete due to lack of historical statistics.

Appearances and goals by club, season and competition
Club	Season	League			National Cup (Note: includes the Women's FA Cup)		League Cup (Note: includes the FA Women's League Cup)		Europe (Note: includes the UEFA Women's Champions League)		Total	
Club	Season	Division	Apps	Goals	Apps	Goals	Apps	Goals	Apps	Goals	Apps	Goals
Bristol City	2011	Women's Super League	7	0	0	0	0	0	2	0	9	0
Bristol City	2012	Women's Super League	7	0	0	0	2	0	—		9	0
Bristol City	2013	Women's Super League	14	0	0	0	3	0	—		17	0
Bristol City	2014	Women's Super League	13	1	0	0	3	0	6	0	22	1
Bristol City	2015	Women's Super League	5	0	0	0	0	0	—		5	0
Bristol City	2016	Women's Super League	0	0	0	0	0	0	—		0	0
Bristol City	2017	Women's Super League	4	0	0	0	0	0	—		4	0
Bristol City	2017-18	Women's Super League	13	0	1	0	3	0	—		17	0
Bristol City	Total		63	1	1	0	11	0	8	0	83	1
Liverpool	2018–19	Women's Super League	10	0	0	0	4	0	—		14	0
Bristol City	2019–20	Women's Super League	13	0	2	0	4	0	—		19	0
Bristol City	2020–21	Women's Super League	10	0	0	0	3	0	—		13	0
Bristol City	Total		23	0	1	0	7	0	—		32	0
Liverpool	2021–22	Women's Championship	19	3	0	0	3	0	—		22	3
Liverpool	2022–23	Women's Super League	20	0	1	0	4	1	—		25	1
Liverpool	2023–24	Women's Super League	12	0	3	0	2	0	—		17	0
Liverpool	2024–25	Women's Super League	9	0	0	0	2	0	—		11	0
Liverpool	Total		60	3	4	0	10	1	—		75	4
Career total			156	4	6	0	32	1	8	0	204	5

== Honours ==
Bristol City

- FA Cup Runner-Up: 2013

Liverpool

- Women's Championship: 2021–2022
