= Lucy Parry =

English footballer (born 2002)

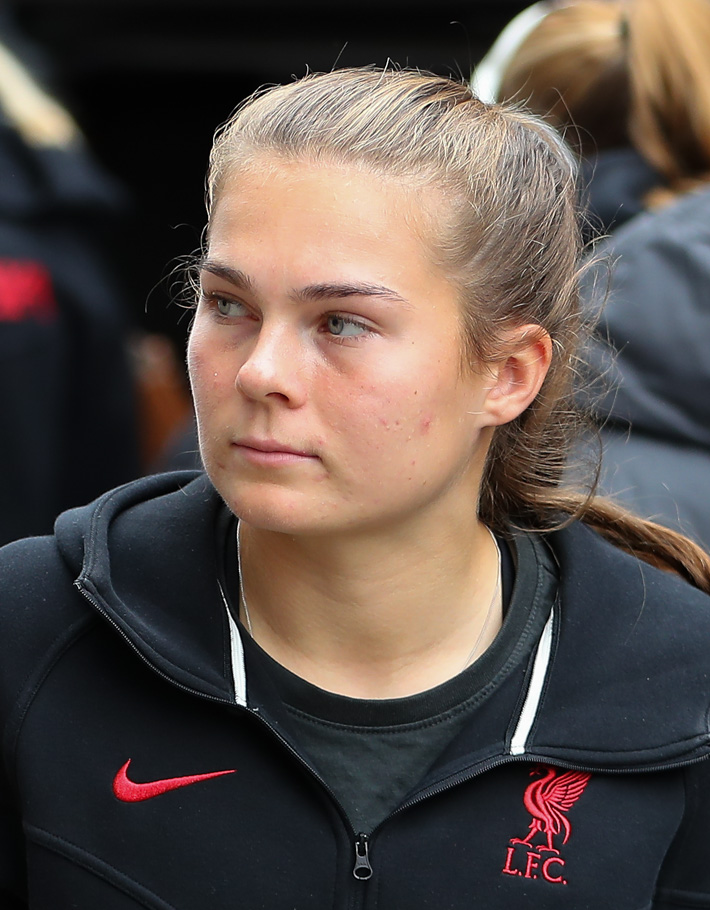
- Parry in 2024

Personal information
- Full name: Lucy Annabel Parry
- Date of birth: 7 May 2004 (age 22)
- Place of birth: Liverpool, England
- Height: 1.64 m (5 ft 4 1/2 in)
- Position: Defender

Team information
- Current team: Liverpool
- Number: 2

Youth career
- 2011–2020: Liverpool

Senior career*
Years	Team	Apps	(Gls)
2020–	Liverpool	31	(0)
2022–2023	→ Hibernian (loan)	29	(2)

International career^{‡}
2020–2021	England U17	1	(0)
2021–2023	England U19	14	(2)
2024–	England U23	0	(0)
- * Club domestic league appearances and goals as of 06:20, 17 March 2026 (UTC) ‡ National team caps and goals as of 15:36, 15 October 2024 (UTC)

Lucy Annabel Parry (born 7 May 2004) is an English professional footballer who plays as a defender for Women's Super League club Liverpool and has captained the England under-19 national team.

== Club career ==
=== Liverpool ===
==== 2020–22: Early beginning ====
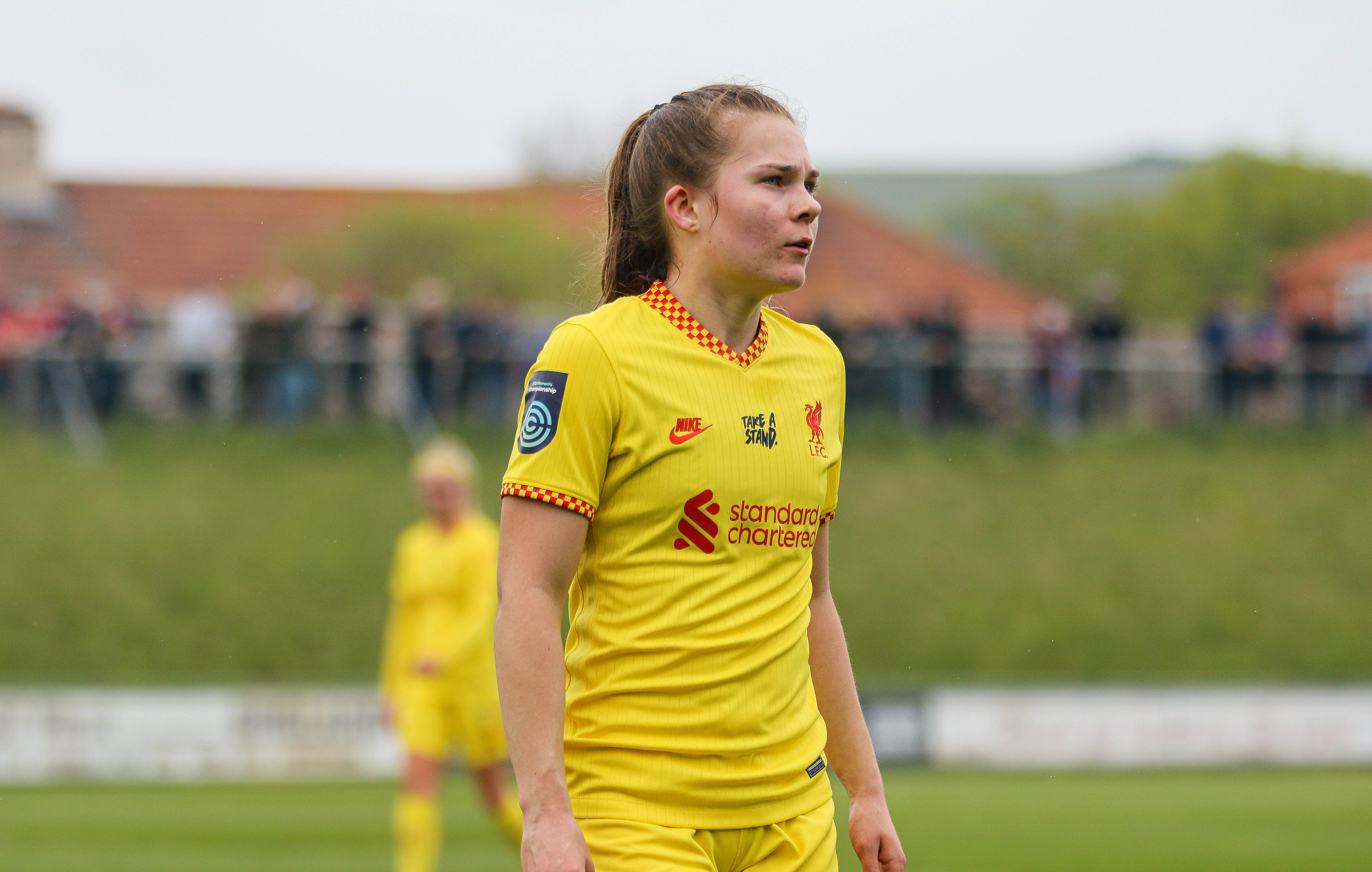
Parry playing for Liverpool against Lewes, May 2022

A lifelong supporter of the club, Parry begun her footballing career with Liverpool when she joined their youth setup at the age of seven. She made her senior debut for the team in a Women's Championship win against Coventry United on 4 October 2020, coming on as substitute for Becky Jane. By doing so, she became the youngest ever player to feature for the first team at the age of 16 years and 150 days. She was used sparingly during her early stint with the first team, making only 11 appearances in all competition during the club's stay in the Women's Championship. She signed her first professional contract with Liverpool in July 2022.

==== 2022–23: Loan to Hibernian ====
Soon after signing her first professional contract with Liverpool, Parry went on loan to Scottish Women's Premier League side Hibernian for the duration of the 2022–23 season. She quickly established herself as the team's first choice right back, as she made 30 appearances across all competitions for the club, starting in 27 of them. She scored her first senior career goal in a league match against Motherwell on 21 August 2022. She went on to start in the 2022 Scottish Women's Premier League Cup final for the club, which they lost 2–1 to Rangers. She was announced as the club's woman player of the year at the end of the season.

==== 2023–Present: First team breakthrough ====
Following her return from loan, Parry enjoyed a breakout season during the 2023–24 campaign, described as "hugely impressive" by the Liverpool Echo. She made 16 appearances across all competition for the Reds as they finished 4th in the Women's Super League, their highest league finish since achieving promotion in the 2021–22 season. On 7 August 2024, it was announced that she signed a new contract extension with the club for an undisclosed length. She also switched her No.32 shirt for the No.2, left vacant following Emma Koivisto's departure from the team. She began the 2024–25 season as the team's first choice right-back, starting for the Reds in their league season opener against Leicester City.

== International career ==
Parry featured in the 2022 UEFA Women's U19 Championship with the England under-19 national team, having scored twice again Northern Ireland in qualification on 23 October 2021.

In February 2023, she captained the England under-19 national team in La Nucia International Tournament matches against Germany and Switzerland.

Parry was named in the England under-23 squad for European League matches against Netherlands and Portugal in October 2024.

== Career statistics ==
=== Club ===
As of match played 15 March 2026

Appearances and goals by club, season and competition
Club	Season	League			National cup (Note: Includes Women's FA Cup, Scottish Women's Cup)		League cup (Note: Includes Women's League Cup, Scottish Women's Premier League Cup)		Total	
Club	Season	Division	Apps	Goals	Apps	Goals	Apps	Goals	Apps	Goals
Liverpool	2020–21	Women's Championship	5	0	0	0	2	0	7	0
Liverpool	2021–22	Women's Championship	1	0	0	0	3	0	4	0
Liverpool	2022–23	Women's Super League	0	0	0	0	0	0	0	0
Liverpool	2023–24	Women's Super League	10	0	2	0	4	0	16	0
Liverpool	2024–25	Women's Super League	10	0	2	1	0	0	12	1
Liverpool	2025–26	Women's Super League	5	0	1	0	3	0	9	0
Liverpool	2026–27	Women's Super League	0	0	0	0	0	0	0	0
Liverpool	Total		31	0	5	1	12	0	48	1
Hibernian (loan)	2022–23	SWPL	29	2	0	0	1	0	30	2
Career total			60	2	5	1	13	0	78	3

== Honours ==
Liverpool

- Women's Championship: 2021–22

Hibernian

- Scottish Women's Premier League Cup runner-up: 2022–23
