= Cornelia Kapocs =

Swedish footballer (born 2000)

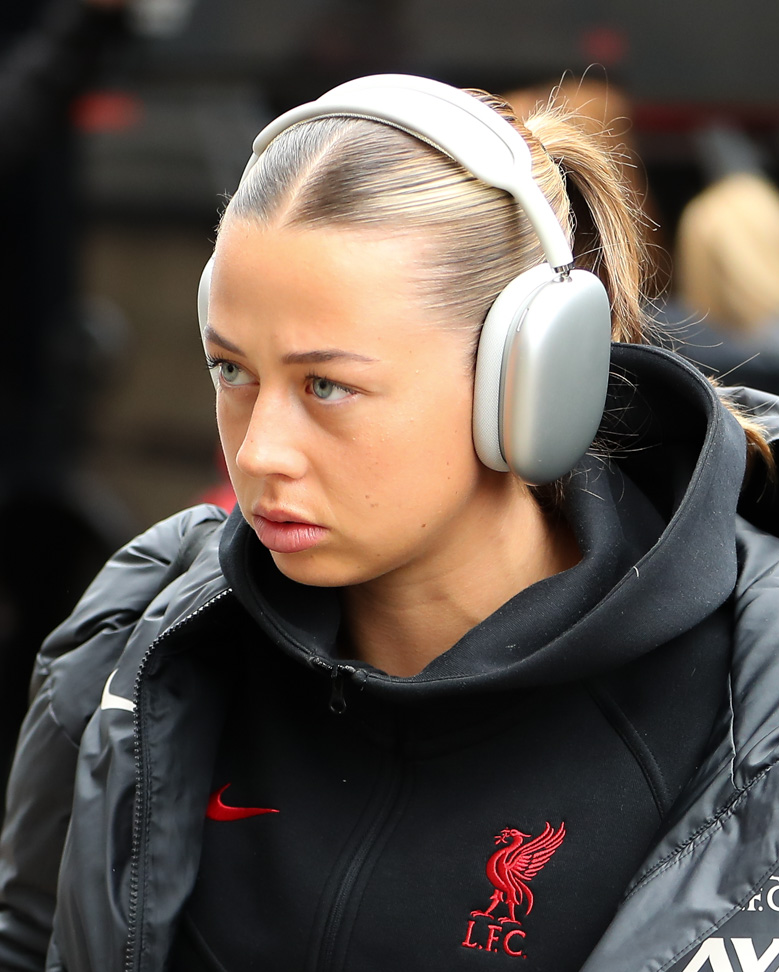
- Kapocs in 2024

Personal information
- Full name: Cornelia Iza Kapocs
- Date of birth: 13 July 2000 (age 26)
- Place of birth: Gothenburg, Sweden
- Height: 1.67 m (5 ft 6 in)
- Positions: Striker; attacking midfielder

Team information
- Current team: Liverpool
- Number: 7

Youth career
- Tölö IF

Senior career*
Years	Team	Apps	(Gls)
2016–2017	Kungsbacka DFF	41	(6)
2018	Ljusdals IF	25	(8)
2019–2020	IK Uppsala	47	(10)
2021–2024	Linköping	83	(32)
2024–	Liverpool	44	(5)

International career^{‡}
2015–2017	Sweden U17	15	(3)
2018–2019	Sweden U19	15	(6)
2019–2025	Sweden U23	33	(7)
- * Club domestic league appearances and goals as of 16:09, 28 September 2026 (UTC) ‡ National team caps and goals as of 2 June 2025

Cornelia Iza Kapocs (born 13 July 2000) is a Swedish professional footballer who plays as a striker for Women's Super League club Liverpool. She previously played for Swedish clubs Kungsbacka DFF, Ljusdals IF, IK Uppsala, and Linköping FC.

== Early life ==
Her grandfather, Géza Kapocs, was a Hungarian footballer who played alongside Ferenc Puskás.

== Club career ==
=== Early career ===
As a youngster, she started her career with Tolo IF, before rising through Swedish football with Kungsbacka DFF, Ljusdals IF, IK Uppsala and eventually Linköping FC.

She made her Elitettan debut for Kungsbacka at the age of 15 and played two seasons in Sweden's second tier.

On 7 December 2020, Linköping FC announced that Kapocs has signed a two-year deal with the club.

=== Liverpool ===
External video
- Kapocs' incredible strike puts Liverpool ahead, WSL Goal of the Month nomination via BBC Sport, 6 October 2024

On 15 August 2024, Kapocs signed for Liverpool from Linköping.

She made her first team debut for the Reds on 6 October 2024 during the 2024–25 season, where she scored the opening goal in a 3–2 victory over Tottenham Hotspur, a stunning long-range lob over the goalkeeper. The goal was later nominated for the WSL Goal of the Month award. Kapocs scored her second goal two weeks later against Crystal Palace, an equaliser bent into the corner of the goal.

== International career ==
Kapocs has represented Sweden at under-17, under-19 and under-23 international youth levels.

On 8 October 2016, Kapocs scored her debut youth international goal for Sweden under-17s, an equaliser against Montenegro resulting in a 2–1 victory during 2017 U17 Championship qualification.

For 2019 Under-19 Championship qualification, she scored a brace against Kazakhstan on 3 October 2018, followed by another brace against Turkey in the elite round of qualification on 9 April 2019.

From 2020 to 2024, Kapocs represented the Sweden under-23s, making 24 appearances and scoring four goals for the youth team.

== Personal life ==
She is currently in a relationship with Swedish footballer, Emilia Larsson.

== Career statistics ==
=== Club ===
As of match played 27 September 2026

Appearances and goals by club, season and competition
Club	Season	League			National cup (Note: Includes Svenska Cupen, Women's FA Cup)		League cup (Note: Includes Women's League Cup)		Continental (Note: Includes the UEFA Women's Champions League)		Total	
Club	Season	Division	Apps	Goals	Apps	Goals	Apps	Goals	Apps	Goals	Apps	Goals
Kungsbacka DFF	2016	Elitettan	17	2	2	2	—		—		19	4
Kungsbacka DFF	2017	Elitettan	24	4	1	0	—		—		25	4
Kungsbacka DFF	Total		41	6	3	2	0	0	0	0	44	8
Ljusdals IF	2018	Elitettan	25	8	1	1	—		—		26	9
IK Uppsala	2019	Elitettan	25	7	3	0	—		—		28	7
IK Uppsala	2020	Damallsvenskan	22	3	4	0	—		—		26	3
IK Uppsala	Total		47	10	7	0	0	0	0	0	54	10
Linköping FC	2021	Damallsvenskan	19	7	4	0	—		—		23	7
Linköping FC	2022	Damallsvenskan	25	2	2	1	—		—		27	3
Linköping FC	2023	Damallsvenskan	25	18	3	1	—		2	0	30	19
Linköping FC	2024	Damallsvenskan	14	5	3	4	—		—		17	9
Linköping FC	Total		83	32	12	6	0	0	2	0	97	38
Liverpool	2024–25	Women's Super League	19	2	4	0	3	2	—		26	4
Liverpool	2025–26	Women's Super League	21	2	3	0	4	0	—		28	2
Liverpool	2026–27	Women's Super League	4	2	0	0	1	0	—		5	2
Liverpool	Total		44	6	7	0	8	2	0	0	59	8
Career total			240	62	30	9	8	2	2	0	280	73
