= Rachael Laws =

English footballer (born 1990)

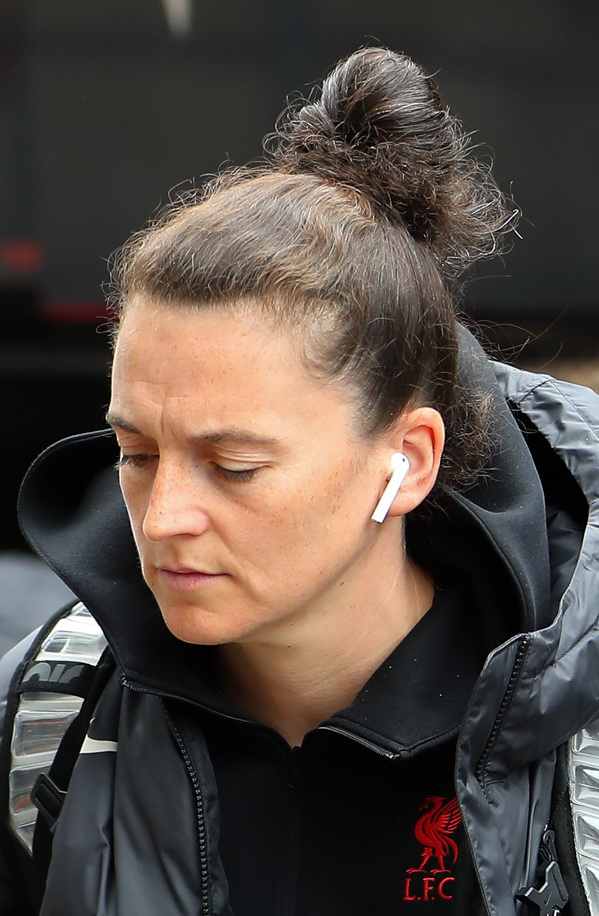
- Laws with Liverpool in 2024

Personal information
- Full name: Rachael Laws
- Date of birth: 5 November 1990 (age 36)
- Place of birth: Newcastle, England
- Height: 1.75 m (5 ft 9 in)
- Position: Goalkeeper

Team information
- Current team: Liverpool
- Number: 1

Senior career*
Years	Team	Apps	(Gls)
2006–2018	Sunderland	128	(0)
2013	→ Liverpool (loan)	9	(0)
2018–2020	Reading	5	(0)
2020–	Liverpool	86	(0)
- * Club domestic league appearances and goals as of 02:58, 16 August 2025 (UTC)

Rachael Laws (born 5 November 1990) is an English footballer who plays as a goalkeeper for Women's Super League club Liverpool.

== Early life ==
Laws was born in Newcastle upon Tyne, and studied at Gateshead College.

== Club career ==
Laws first played for Liverpool during the 2013 FA WSL season. She played 9 games and helped her side win the title while battling for a place in the first team with Sarah Quantrill. She then signed for Sunderland on 31 December 2013 going on to make 36 appearances in the WSL. Following Sunderland's denial for a place in the 2018–19 FA WSL she joined Reading. She said in an interview with BBC Sport: "Reading is somewhere I want to personally be and thrive hopefully while I am here". On 8 June 2020, Reading announced that Laws had left the club after her contract had expired. On 7 July 2020, it was announced that Laws had joined recently relegated side Liverpool F.C. Women having previously been on loan to the club in 2013.

On 25 July 2025, it was announced that Laws had signed a new contract to extend her time with Liverpool, with her saying that "Over the summer it was a no-brainer when the club said they wanted to keep me here."

== International career ==
Laws was called up by Mark Sampson in 2014 for England's World Cup qualification but was an unused substitute in a 10–0 away win against Montenegro.

== Career statistics ==
=== Club ===
As of match played 10 May 2025'

Some entries may be missing or incomplete due to lack of historical statistics.

Appearances and goals by club, season and competition
Club	Season	League			National Cup (Note: Includes the Women's FA Cup)		League Cup (Note: Includes the WSL Cup/Women's League Cup and FA Women's National League Cup)		Total	
Club	Season	Division	Apps	Goals	Apps	Goals	Apps	Goals	Apps	Goals
Sunderland	2005–06	Women's Premier League	4	0	0	0	3	0	7	0
Sunderland	2006–07	Women's Premier League	6	0	0	0	0	0	6	0
Sunderland	2007–08	Women's Premier League North	7	0	0	0	1	0	8	0
Sunderland	2008–09	Women's Premier League North	9	0	0	0	2	0	11	0
Sunderland	2009–10	Women's Premier League	21	0	1	0	2	0	24	0
Sunderland	2010–11	Women's Premier League	17	0	0	0	2	0	19	0
Sunderland	2011–12	Women's Premier League	12	0	1	0	4	0	17	0
Sunderland	2012–13	Women's Premier League	16	0	0	0	6	0	22	0
Sunderland	2014	Women's Super League 2	0	0	1	0	3	0	4	0
Sunderland	2015	Women's Super League	8	0	1	0	1	0	10	0
Sunderland	2016	Women's Super League	13	0	2	0	0	0	15	0
Sunderland	2017–18	Women's Super League	15	0	0	0	5	0	20	0
Sunderland	Total		128	0	6	0	29	0	163	0
Liverpool (on loan)	2013	Women's Super League	9	0	0	0	1	0	10	0
Reading	2018–19	Women's Super League	0	0	0	0	2	0	2	0
Reading	2019–20	Women's Super League	5	0	1	0	5	0	11	0
Reading	Total		5	0	1	0	7	0	13	0
Liverpool	2020–21	Women's Championship	18	0	1	0	0	0	19	0
Liverpool	2021–22	Women's Championship	19	0	1	0	1	0	21	0
Liverpool	2022–23	Women's Super League	17	0	1	0	0	0	18	0
Liverpool	2023–24	Women's Super League	15	0	2	0	2	0	19	0
Liverpool	2024–25	Women's Super League	15	0	4	0	1	0	20	0
Liverpool	Total		84	0	9	0	4	0	97	0
Career total			226	0	16	0	41	0	283	0

== Honours ==
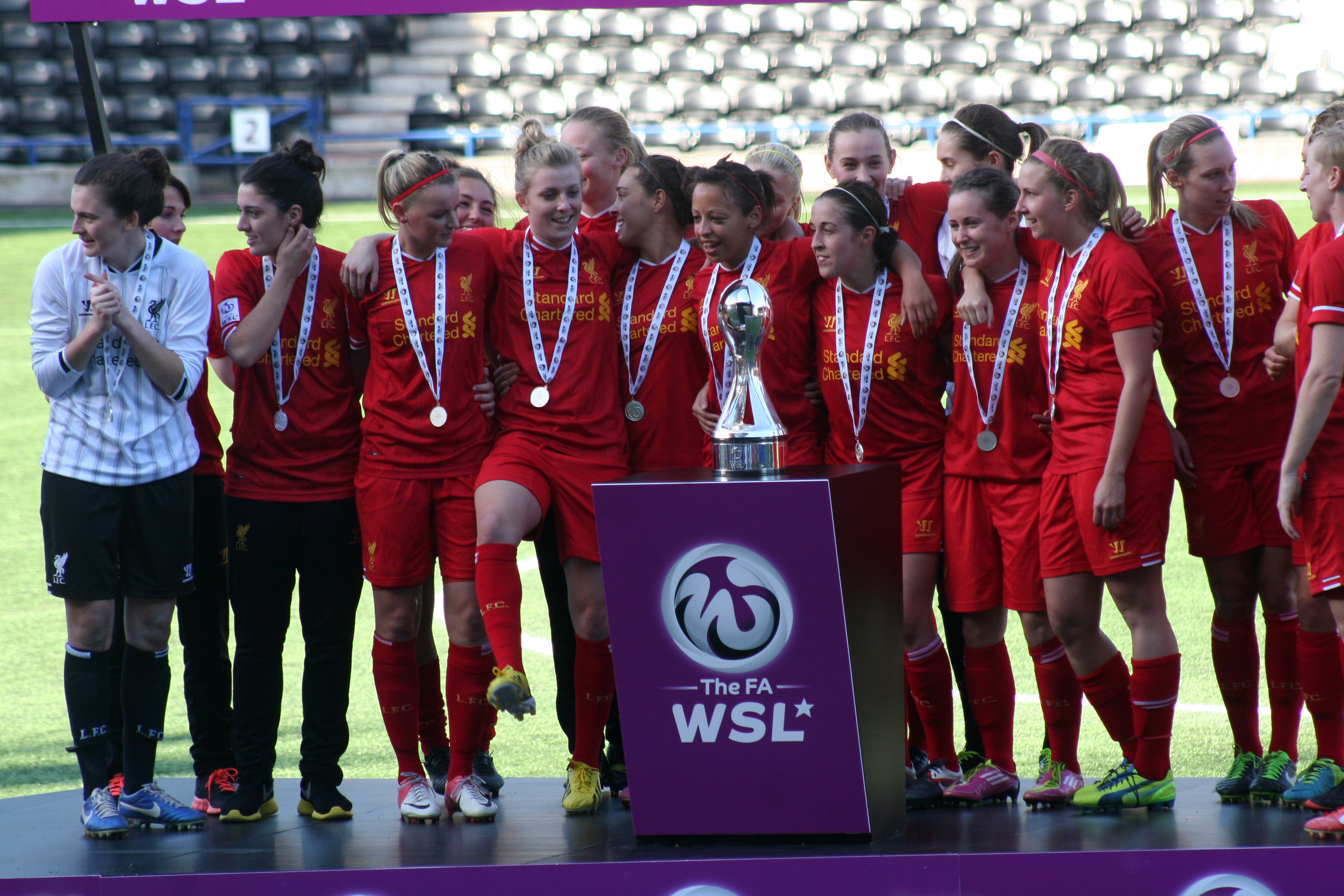
Laws (left) with Liverpool celebrating their WSL title win in 2013

- FA Women's Super League

Winner (1): 2013

- FA Women's Championship

Winner (2): 2014, 2021-22

- FA Women's National League North

Winner (1): 2008-09

- FA Women's National League Cup

Winner (1): 2011-12

- Women's FA Cup

Runner-Up (1): 2008-09
