= Sophie Román Haug =

Norwegian footballer (born 1999)

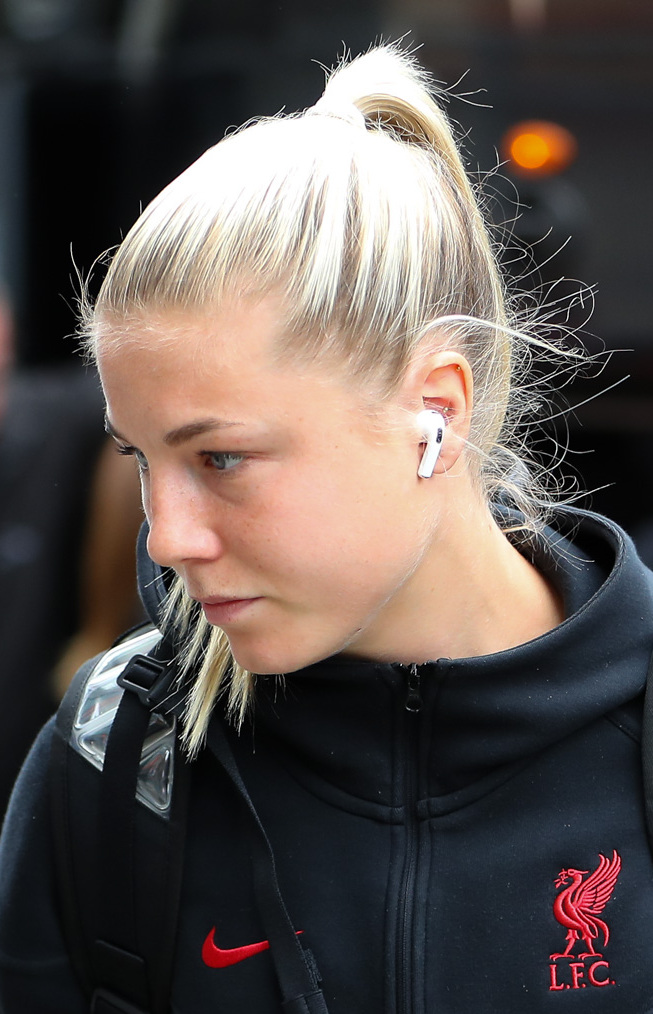
- Román Haug with Liverpool in 2024

Personal information
- Date of birth: 4 June 1999 (age 27)
- Place of birth: Kløfta, Norway
- Height: 1.78 m (5 ft 10 in)
- Position: Forward

Team information
- Current team: Liverpool
- Number: 10

Youth career
- –2014: Kløfta
- 2015: LSK Kvinner

Senior career*
Years	Team	Apps	(Gls)
2015–2021	LSK Kvinner	108	(49)
2022–2023	Roma	25	(11)
2023–	Liverpool	41	(10)

International career^{‡}
2014	Norway U15	2	(0)
2015	Norway U16	12	(3)
2016	Norway U17	9	(7)
2016–2018	Norway U19	27	(11)
2018–2022	Norway U23	10	(5)
2022–	Norway	20	(12)
- * Club domestic league appearances and goals as of 16:11, 28 September 2026 (UTC) ‡ National team caps and goals as of 02:46, 22 May 2024 (UTC)

Sophie Román Haug (Norwegian: [sʊˈfìːə rʊˈmɑːn ˈhæʉɡ]; born 4 June 1999) is a Norwegian professional footballer who plays as a forward for English Women's Super League club Liverpool and the Norway national team.

== Club career ==
After playing for Kløfta Idrettslag, she went to LSK Kvinner in 2015. She was heavily involved in her team winning both the cup and the league in 2018, with 14 league goals. She became LSK's top scorer in 2020 with eight goals. In 2021, she was named to the team of the year in the Toppserien by NTB, after nine goals in 15 league games.

In January 2022, she signed for Roma, becoming the most expensive sale from LSK Kvinner ever.

In September 2023, she signed for Liverpool for an undisclosed fee. She scored her first goal for Liverpool on 12 November 2023 against Tottenham Hotspur, equalizing the game 1-1 in the 66th minute.

On 21 October 2025, Liverpool announced that Román Haug had suffered an anterior-cruciate ligament (ACL) injury, just a week after teammate Marie Höbinger had ruptured hers.

== International career ==
=== Youth ===
Haug has represented Norway at U15, U16, U17, U19, and U23 level, as well as the senior national team.

On 21 July 2018, she scored a goal in a 1–0 victory over France during the UEFA Under-19 European Championship.

=== Senior ===
Haug was called up for the Norwegian senior national team for the first time in 2018. In 2022, she was selected for the national team's squad for the 2022 UEFA European Championships. Her debut came on 29 June 2022 in a friendly match against Denmark.

She scored her first three senior national team goals in the World Cup qualifier at home against Albania, on 6 September 2022, which ended in a 5–0 victory.

On 19 June 2023, she was included in the 23-player Norwegian squad for the FIFA Women's World Cup 2023. On 30 July, she scored a hat-trick in a 6–0 victory over the Philippines in the last World Cup group stage match, which qualified her country to the knockout phase. It was the fourth instance of a Norwegian player scoring a hat-trick at the Women's World Cup and the first since 2007.

== Career statistics ==
=== Club ===
As of match played 27 September 2026

Appearances and goals by club, season and competition
Club	Season	League			National cup (Note: Includes Norwegian Women's Cup, Coppa Italia)		League cup (Note: Includes FA Women's League Cup)		Continental (Note: Includes UEFA Women's Champions League)		Other (Note: Includes Supercoppa Italiana)		Total	
Club	Season	Division	Apps	Goals	Apps	Goals	Apps	Goals	Apps	Goals	Apps	Goals	Apps	Goals
LSK Kvinner	2015	Toppserien	2	0	0	0	—		0	0	—		2	0
LSK Kvinner	2016	Toppserien	13	2	3	3	—		0	0	—		16	5
LSK Kvinner	2017	Toppserien	20	15	3	0	—		0	0	—		23	15
LSK Kvinner	2018	Toppserien	22	14	5	8	—		3	0	—		30	22
LSK Kvinner	2019	Toppserien	19	1	4	1	—		5	0	—		28	2
LSK Kvinner	2020	Toppserien	18	8	4	0	—		2	0	—		24	8
LSK Kvinner	2021	Toppserien	15	9	2	0	—		4	1	—		21	10
LSK Kvinner	Total		109	49	21	12	—		14	1	—		144	62
Roma	2021–22	Serie A	7	4	3	0	—		—		—		10	4
Roma	2022–23	Serie A	18	7	1	0	—		9	1	1	0	29	8
Roma	Total		25	11	4	0	—		9	1	1	0	39	12
Liverpool	2023–24	Women's Super League	20	7	2	1	2	1	—		—		24	9
Liverpool	2024–25	Women's Super League	15	3	4	0	0	0	—		—		19	3
Liverpool	2025–26	Women's Super League	5	0	0	0	2	2	—		—		7	2
Liverpool	2026–27	Women's Super League	1	0	0	0	1	0	—		—		2	0
Liverpool	Total		41	10	6	1	5	3	—		—		52	14
Career total			175	70	31	13	5	3	23	2	1	0	235	88

=== International ===
As of match played 10 April 2024

Appearances and goals by national team and year
National team	Year	Apps	Goals
Norway	2022	8	5
Norway	2023	9	4
Norway	2024	3	3
Total		20	12

Scores and results list Norway's goal tally first, score column indicates score after each Haug goal.

List of international goals scored by Sophie Román Haug
No.	Date	Venue	Opponent	Score	Result	Competition
1	6 September 2022	Ullevaal Stadion, Oslo, Norway	Albania	1–0	5–0	2023 FIFA Women's World Cup qualification
2	6 September 2022	Ullevaal Stadion, Oslo, Norway	Albania	2–0	5–0	2023 FIFA Women's World Cup qualification
3	6 September 2022	Ullevaal Stadion, Oslo, Norway	Albania	4–0	5–0	2023 FIFA Women's World Cup qualification
4	11 October 2022	ADO Den Haag Stadium, The Hague, Netherlands	Netherlands	1–0	2–0	Friendly
5	11 November 2022	Estadi Olímpic Camilo Cano, La Nucia, Spain	France	1–1	1–2	Friendly
6	30 July 2023	Eden Park, Auckland, New Zealand	Philippines	1–0	6–0	2023 FIFA Women's World Cup
7	30 July 2023	Eden Park, Auckland, New Zealand	Philippines	2–0	6–0	2023 FIFA Women's World Cup
8	30 July 2023	Eden Park, Auckland, New Zealand	Philippines	6–0	6–0	2023 FIFA Women's World Cup
9	1 December 2023	Ullevaal Stadion, Oslo, Norway	Portugal	4–0	4–0	2023–24 UEFA Women's Nations League
10	27 February 2024	Viking Stadion, Stavanger, Norway	Croatia	2–0	5–0	2023–24 UEFA Women's Nations League play-offs
11	27 February 2024	Viking Stadion, Stavanger, Norway	Croatia	3–0	5–0	2023–24 UEFA Women's Nations League play-offs
12	6 April 2024	Ullevaal Stadion, Oslo, Norway	Finland	2–0	4–0	UEFA Women's Euro 2025 qualification

== Honours ==
LSK Kvinner

- Toppserien: 2015, 2016, 2017, 2018, 2019
- Norwegian Women's Cup: 2015, 2016, 2018, 2019

Roma

- Serie A: 2022–23
- Supercoppa Italiana: 2022–23
- Coppa Italia runner-up: 2021–22
