= Olivia Smith (soccer) =

Canadian soccer player (born 2004)

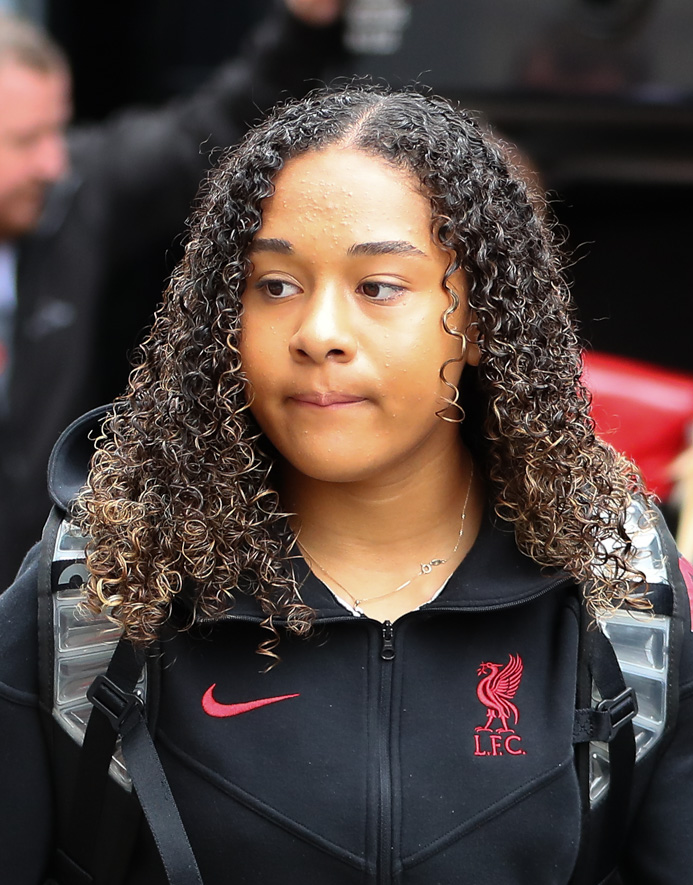
- Smith in 2024

Personal information
- Full name: Olivia Smith
- Date of birth: August 5, 2004 (age 22)
- Place of birth: North York, Ontario, Canada
- Height: 5 ft 4 in (1.63 m)
- Position: Forward

Team information
- Current team: Arsenal
- Number: 11

Youth career
- Whitby SC
- Oshawa Kicks SC
- Ajax SC
- Markham FC
- North Toronto SC
- NDC Ontario
- North Toronto SC

College career
Years	Team	Apps	(Gls)
2022	Penn State Nittany Lions	16	(1)

Senior career*
Years	Team	Apps	(Gls)
2022	North Toronto Nitros	11	(18)
2023–2024	Sporting CP	18	(13)
2024–2025	Liverpool	20	(7)
2025–	Arsenal	30	(6)

International career^{‡}
2018	Canada U15	4	(1)
2022–2024	Canada U20	22	(22)
2019–	Canada	25	(6)
- * Club domestic league appearances and goals as of November 22, 2026 ‡ National team caps and goals as of October 12, 2026

Olivia Smith (born August 5, 2004) is a Canadian professional soccer player who plays as a forward for Women's Super League (WSL) club Arsenal and the Canada national team.

After successful stints with the American NCAA's Penn State Nittany Lions and the Portuguese club Sporting CP, Smith joined Liverpool in the WSL, where she became the first non-Englishwoman to win the Professional Footballers' Association's Women's Young Player of the Year honour. Following this, her transfer to Arsenal made her the first £1 million women's soccer signing, and she was voted Women's Young Player of the Year for a second time.

== Early life ==
Smith was born in North York, Ontario, but grew up in Whitby. She has described herself as being strongly focused on football from an early age, saying she was watching soccer "as soon as [she] came out of the womb". She began playing soccer at the age of three, and her father was the coach of the first team she played for.

She has credited her father with shaping her focus, recalling that he would spend hours with her watching sports highlights and football books, later filming her matches, keeping a handwritten record of her goals, assists and touches, and taking her to early-morning training sessions in Brampton even in winter conditions. She first played house league with the Whitby Soccer Club, before playing at the competitive level with Oshawa Kicks SC, Ajax SC, Markham FC and then North Toronto SC. Afterwards, she joined the Ontario Regional Excel (REX) program (later renamed NDC Ontario), before returning to North Toronto SC to train in advance of her move to college, where she committed to join the Florida State Seminoles.

Smith has also spoken about a multi-sport upbringing, stating that her parents enrolled her in gymnastics and taekwondo alongside soccer to build flexibility, discipline and a strong mentality in one-on-one situations. She has described enjoying taekwondo sparring with an attacking mindset and later carrying that mentality into football by seeking to "dominate every time" she plays and treating individual duels with defenders as comparable to facing a single opponent in a fight, something her father has said he deliberately encouraged when she was young.

== College career ==
Smith initially committed to attend Florida State University, where she spent one semester, but she instead decided to attend Penn State University, where she played for the women's soccer team. She made her debut on September 18, 2022, coming on as a second-half substitute against the Indiana Hoosiers. She scored her first collegiate goal on September 25 against the Illinois Fighting Illini. After one season, she elected to forgo her remaining eligibility to sign a professional contract.

== Club career ==
In 2022, Smith played for the North Toronto Nitros in League1 Ontario. She made her debut on May 7 against Alliance United. In her next match on May 14, she scored her first goal against Simcoe County Rovers FC. She scored a brace on May 18 against Electric City FC. She scored four goals in a 6–1 victory over BVB IA Waterloo on June 18. After the season, she was named Young Player of the Season, Forward of the Year, and won the Golden Boot after leading the league in scoring with 18 goals, while only appearing in 11 games. She was also named a league First Team All-Star and U18 All-Star in 2022.

In July 2023, Smith signed her first professional contract and joined Portuguese club Sporting CP in the Campeonato Nacional Feminino on a three-year deal. In her league debut, she scored and added an assist for the club. Enjoying success in her first professional season, a season-ending poll of the league's coaches and captains voted Smith the player of the year. She later received the league's juried award as best young player of the season.

=== Liverpool ===
In July 2024, Smith signed with English club Liverpool in the Women's Super League for a fee of £200,000. She became the first ever woman to score for Liverpool at Anfield, in a 2–1 defeat to Manchester City on October 13. Smith quickly became a key figure on the team, and in January drew headlines when Liverpool complained to Professional Game Match Officials Limited about what they perceived as league referees' lack of appropriate action against other teams' fouling of her. On March 14, she scored two goals at Anfield against Manchester United in Liverpool's first ever win at the venue. She finished the season with 9 goals in 25 appearances across all competitions, and was named Players' Player of the Year and Players' Young Player of the Year by the club. The Professional Footballers' Association subsequently awarded Smith its PFA Women's Young Player of the Year honour. She was the first non-English recipient of the award, which she said "genuinely means the world to me."

=== Arsenal ===
On July 17, 2025, Smith completed a move to Arsenal for a world record fee of £1 million, becoming at that time the most expensive signing in women's football history, with a new four-year contract. She cited her "dream to compete for the biggest titles here in England and in Europe" as reason for joining the club. Smith scored during her debut game for Arsenal, Arsenal's opening goal of the 2025–26 WSL season, in a 4–1 victory against London City Lionesses on September 6, 2025. She was named as the player of the match, and the goal was later named the WSL goal of the month for September 2025. Arsenal participated in the inaugural FIFA Women's Champions Cup, and reached the final on February 1, where Smith scored in Arsenal's 3–2 victory over Brazilian club SC Corinthians Paulista. Smith suffered an injury resulting from a head clash in a February 22 FA Cup match against Bristol City, and was taken off the pitch on a stretcher. After missing a month's worth of games, she returned to play on March 15, and scored the first goal in Arsenal's 2–0 WSL victory over London City Lionesses. Smith finished the season with 10 goals in 38 appearances, and she received the Professional Footballers' Association's Women's Young Player of the Year award for the second consecutive year. She was only the second player to win it more than once, after Lauren Hemp, and called it "a really great feeling" to have been given the respect by her fellow players.

== International career ==
In 2017, Smith made her debut in the Canada Soccer program, when she attended a youth camp at age 12. She made her international debut for the Canadian U15 team at the 2018 CONCACAF Under-15 Championship.

In late October 2019, she was called up to the Canada national team for the first time. On November 7, 2019, she became the youngest player ever to debut for the senior national team at the 15 years and 94 days old, when she replaced Jordyn Huitema in the 86th minute of a match against Brazil in the Women's International Tournament played in Chongqing, China, breaking the previous record set by Kara Lang. In the same tournament, Smith got her second international cap in a match against New Zealand. Following the appearance, she then attended a camp with the Canada U-17 team.

She was named the 2019 Canadian Youth International Player of the Year. In 2022, she was named to the Canada U20 team for the 2022 FIFA U-20 World Cup. In April 2023, she scored a pair of hat tricks during the 2023 CONCACAF U-20 Championship qualification tournament against Martinique and St. Vincent and the Grenadines.

After being a late addition to the Canadian pre-tournament camp for the 2023 FIFA Women's World Cup, Smith was named to the final squad. At age 18, she was its youngest member. Smith made her World Cup debut in Canada's final group stage match, as a substitute against Australia.

Smith began 2024 being named to the Canadian squad for the 2024 CONCACAF W Gold Cup, while citing that her "biggest goal" for the year was to make the smaller eighteen-person team for the 2024 Summer Olympics in Paris. She scored her first senior international goal in Canada's opening game of the Gold Cup, a 6–0 rout of El Salvador. Smith was then given her first start at the senior level in the second group game, against Paraguay, and scored her second goal of the tournament. She missed the quarter-final against Costa Rica while in concussion protocol. Smith played thirty minutes of extra time in the semi-final versus the United States, which ultimately saw Canada ousted in the penalty shootout. She received the Young Player Award at the conclusion of the tournament. The Gold Cup was called Smith's "true breakout on the international stage." Due to injury, she was unable to participate in the 2024 SheBelieves Cup, and ultimately was not included in the Canadian Olympic roster. Smith was named the 2024 Canada Soccer Young Player of the Year.

During an International friendly against Switzerland on 24 October, Smith went off with an injury in the 32nd minute. She later withdrew from the camp and returned to Arsenal with a Hip pointer.

Having initially been selected, in February 2026, Smith withdrew from the Canada squad for the 2026 SheBelieves Cup due to concussion which was sustained while playing for Arsenal.

Smith made her return to the national team after her concussion as she was called up for the 2026 FIFA Series in Brazil in April 2026. She featured in a 1–0 loss to Brazil in the final, as Canada finished in second in the tournament on April 18, 2026.

== Personal life ==
Smith is of Jamaican, Chilean, and Peruvian descent. In 2023, she joined the League1 Ontario Women's Football Subcommittee.

== Career statistics ==
=== Club ===
As of match played November 22, 2026

Appearances and goals by club, season and competition
Club	Season	League			National cup (Note: Includes Taça de Portugal, Women's FA Cup)		League cup (Note: Includes Taça da Liga, Women's League Cup)		Continental		Other		Total	
Club	Season	Division	Apps	Goals	Apps	Goals	Apps	Goals	Apps	Goals	Apps	Goals	Apps	Goals
North Toronto Nitros	2022	League1 Ontario	11	18	—		—		—		—		11	18
Sporting CP	2023–24	Campeonato Nacional Feminino	18	13	4	2	5	1	—		1 (Note: Appearance in Supertaça de Portugal)	0	28	16
Liverpool	2024–25	Women's Super League	20	7	3	1	2	1	—		—		25	9
Arsenal	2025–26	Women's Super League	20	5	3	0	2	0	11 (Note: Appearances in UEFA Women's Champions League)	3	2 (Note: Appearances in FIFA Women's Champions Cup)	2	38	10
Arsenal	2026–27	Women's Super League	10	1	0	0	—		5	0	—		15	1
Arsenal	Total		30	6	3	0	2	0	16	3	2	2	53	11
Career total			79	44	10	3	9	2	16	3	3	2	117	54

=== International ===
As of match played October 12, 2026

Appearances and goals by national team and year
National team	Year	Apps	Goals
Canada	2019	2	0
Canada	2020	0	0
Canada	2021	0	0
Canada	2022	0	0
Canada	2023	2	0
Canada	2024	9	3
Canada	2025	6	1
Canada	2026	6	2
Total		25	6

Scores and results list Canada's goal tally first, score column indicates score after each Smith goal.

List of international goals scored by Olivia Smith
No.	Date	Venue	Opponent	Score	Result	Competition
1	February 22, 2024	Shell Energy Stadium, Houston, United States	El Salvador	6–0	6–0	2024 CONCACAF W Gold Cup
2	February 25, 2024	Shell Energy Stadium, Houston, United States	Paraguay	2–0	4–0	2024 CONCACAF W Gold Cup
3	December 3, 2024	Pinatar Arena, San Pedro del Pinatar, Spain	South Korea	3–0	5–1	Friendly
4	May 31, 2025	Princess Auto Stadium, Winnipeg, Canada	Haiti	4–1	4–1	Friendly
5	October 9, 2026	Stade Saputo, Montreal, Canada	Denmark	1–1	1–1	Friendly
6	October 12, 2026	BMO Field, Toronto, Canada	Denmark	3–4	3–4	Friendly

== Honours ==
Arsenal

- FIFA Women's Champions Cup: 2026

Individual

- Canada Soccer Young Player of the Year: 2019, 2024
- CONCACAF W Gold Cup Best Young Player: 2024
- L1O Forwards of the Year: 2022
- L1O Young Player of the Year (U20): 2022
- L1O First Team All-Star: 2022
- L1O Golden Boot: 2022
- Liga BPI Young Player of the Season: 2023–24
- Liverpool Players' Player of the Year: 2024–25
- Liverpool Players' Young Player of the Year: 2024–25
- PFA Women's Young Player of the Year: 2024–25, 2025–26
