= Jenna Clark =

Scottish footballer (born 2001)

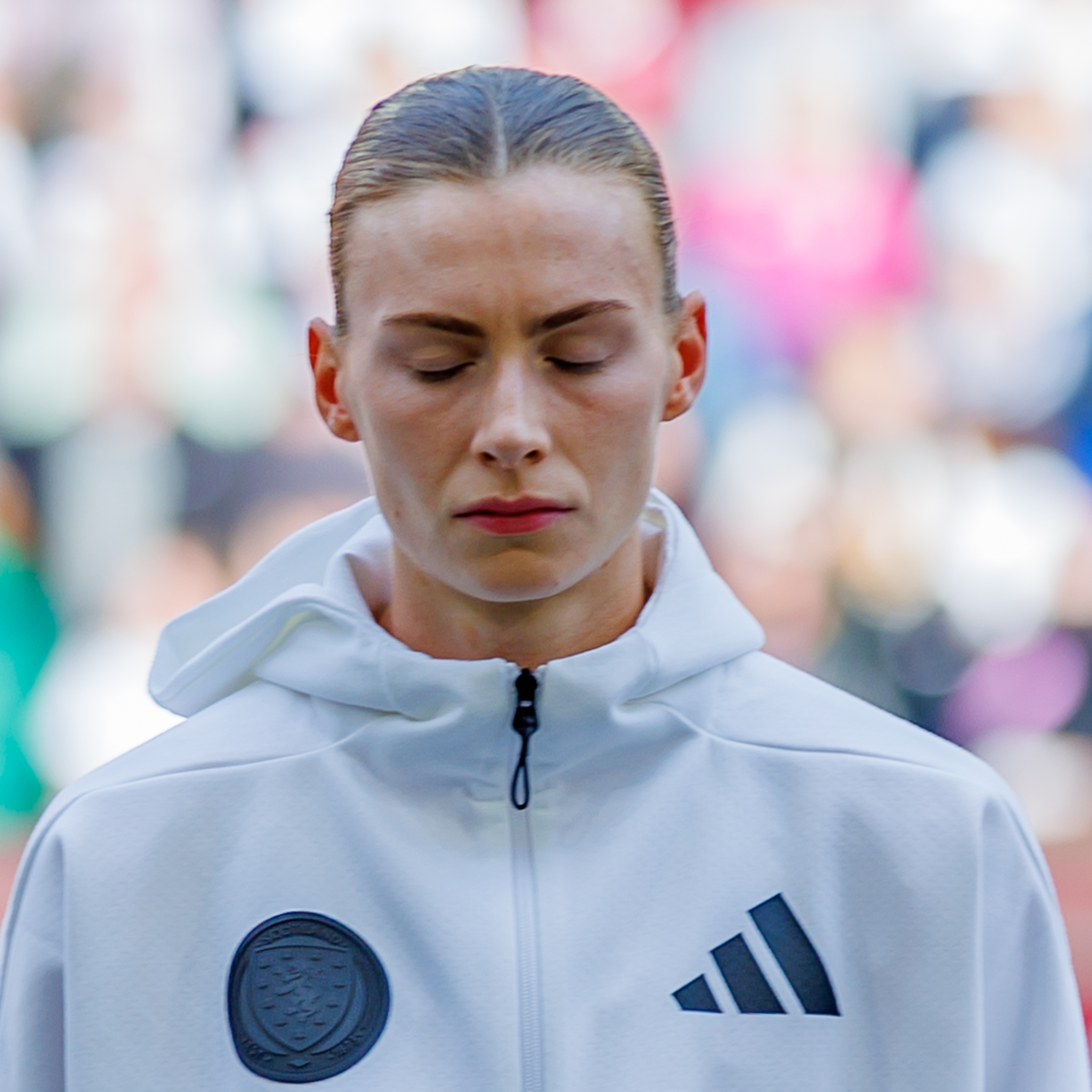
- Clark lining up for Scotland, 2025

Personal information
- Full name: Jenna Louise Clark
- Date of birth: 29 September 2001 (age 25)
- Place of birth: Glasgow, Scotland
- Height: 6 ft 1 in (1.85 m)
- Position: Defender

Team information
- Current team: Liverpool
- Number: 17

Youth career
- Rangers

Senior career*
Years	Team	Apps	(Gls)
2017–2018	Rangers		
2018–2023	Glasgow City	91	(21)
2023–	Liverpool	67	(1)

International career^{‡}
2016	Scotland U16	1	(0)
2017–2018	Scotland U17	8	(1)
2018–2020	Scotland U19	19	(1)
2021–	Scotland	36	(5)
- * Club domestic league appearances and goals as of 15:58, 28 September 2026 (UTC) ‡ National team caps and goals as of 20:20, 15 October 2026 (UTC)

Jenna Louise Clark (born 29 September 2001) is a Scottish professional footballer who plays as a defender for English Women's Super League club Liverpool and the Scotland national team. She has previously played for Rangers and Glasgow City.

== Club career ==
Clark started her career with Scottish Women's Premier League club Rangers, being promoted from their youth team to the senior squad in February 2017. She moved to Glasgow City in July 2018, and two months later was named in a UEFA Women's Champions League squad for a match in Cyprus when she was aged 16 and still at school. During her time with City, Clark won four Scottish league championships and the Scottish Women's Cup once.

She signed a two-year contract with Liverpool on 10 July 2023. She made her Reds debut on 1 October 2023 in a 1–0 Women's Super League win over Arsenal at the Emirates Stadium.

== International career ==
Clark represented Scotland at various youth levels before making her full international debut in September 2021. She scored a goal during that first appearance for Scotland, a 7–1 win against the Faroe Islands at Hampden Park.

== Career statistics ==
=== Club ===
As of match played 27 September 2026

Appearances and goals by club, season and competition
Club	Season	League			National cup (Note: Includes Scottish Women's Cup, Women's FA Cup)		League cup (Note: Includes Scottish Women's Premier League Cup, FA Women's League Cup)		Continental		Total	
Club	Season	Division	Apps	Goals	Apps	Goals	Apps	Goals	Apps	Goals	Apps	Goals
Rangers	2017–18	SWPL	?	?	?	?	?	?	—		?	?
Glasgow City	2018–19	SWPL	19	6	?	?	?	?	6	1	25	7
Glasgow City	2019–20	SWPL	1	0	?	?	?	?	5	0	6	0
Glasgow City	2020–21	SWPL	15	1	?	?	?	?	3	0	18	1
Glasgow City	2021–22	SWPL	25	4	2	1	5	3	2	0	34	7
Glasgow City	2022–23	SWPL	31	10	?	?	?	?	2	0	33	10
Glasgow City	Total		91	21	2	1	5	3	18	1	116	25
Liverpool	2023–24	Women's Super League	21	1	3	0	4	0	—		28	1
Liverpool	2024–25	Women's Super League	21	0	2	0	1	1	—		24	1
Liverpool	2025–26	Women's Super League	21	0	3	0	4	2	—		28	2
Liverpool	2026–27	Women's Super League	4	0	0	0	0	0	—		4	0
Liverpool	Total		67	1	8	0	9	3	0	0	84	4
Career total			158	22	10	1	14	6	18	1	200	29

=== International ===
As of match played 13 October 2026

Appearances and goals by national team and year
National team	Year	Apps	Goals
Scotland	2021	2	1
Scotland	2022	2	0
Scotland	2023	6	0
Scotland	2024	9	0
Scotland	2025	9	0
Scotland	2026	8	4
Total		36	5

Scores and results list Scotland's goal tally first, score column indicates score after each Clark goal.

List of international goals scored by Jenna Clark
No.	Date	Venue	Opponent	Score	Result	Competition
1	21 September 2021	Hampden Park, Glasgow, Scotland	Faroe Islands	6–1	7–1	2023 FIFA World Cup qualification
2	3 March 2026	Stade Émile Mayrisch, Esch-sur-Alzette, Luxembourg	Luxembourg	2–0	5–0	2027 FIFA Women's World Cup qualification
3	7 March 2026	Hampden Park, Glasgow, Scotland	Luxembourg	2–0	7–0	2027 FIFA Women's World Cup qualification
4	7 March 2026	Hampden Park, Glasgow, Scotland	Luxembourg	4–0	7–0	2027 FIFA Women's World Cup qualification
5	9 June 2026	Bozsik Aréna, Budapest, Hungary	Israel	2–0	5–1	2027 FIFA Women's World Cup qualification
