= Yana Daniëls =

Belgian footballer (born 1992)

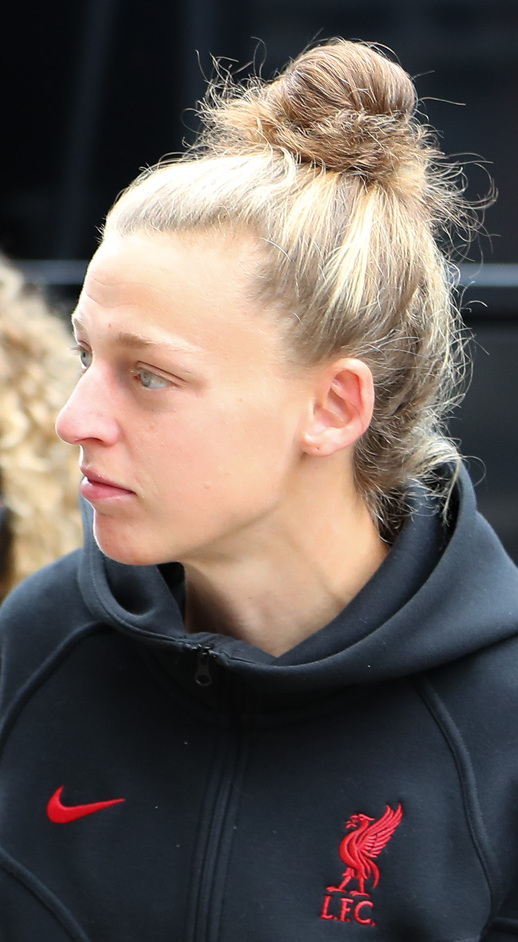
- Daniëls with Liverpool in 2024

Personal information
- Date of birth: 8 May 1992 (age 34)
- Place of birth: Knesselare, Belgium
- Height: 1.71 m (5 ft 7 in)
- Position: Striker

Team information
- Current team: Wolverhampton Wanderers
- Number: 20

Senior career*
Years	Team	Apps	(Gls)
2008–2010	Oud-Heverlee Leuven	46	(7)
2010–2011	Sint-Truidense V.V. (women)	12	(4)
2011–2012	Oud-Heverlee Leuven	22	(8)
2012–2014	Lierse SK	48	(10)
2014–2015	FC Twente	18	(4)
2015–2017	RSC Anderlecht	7	(3)
2017–2018	Bristol City	17	(1)
2018–2019	Liverpool	15	(1)
2019–2021	Bristol City	37	(3)
2021–2025	Liverpool	48	(4)
2025–2026	Burnley	0+	(0+)
2026–	Wolverhampton Wanderers	0	(0)

International career^{‡}
2007–2008	Belgium U-17	9	(4)
2008–2011	Belgium U-19	11	(3)
2011–	Belgium	45	(7)
- * Club domestic league appearances and goals as of 27 May 2023 ‡ National team caps and goals as of 16 February 2022

Yana Daniëls (Flemish: [ˈjaːnaː ˈdaːnijɛls]; born 8 May 1992) is a Belgian professional footballer who plays as a striker for Women's Super League 2 club Wolverhampton Wanderers and the Belgium national team.

== Club career ==
Daniëls started her club career at Oud-Heverlee Leuven, 2008–2010 where she originally scored 7 goals in 46 games.

Daniëls left OH Leuven and joined Sint-Truidense, scoring 4 times in 12 regular season appearances. Daniëls returned to OH Leuven for one season where she scored 8 goals in 22 league appearances.

Daniëls joined Lierse SK from OH Leuven ahead of the 2012 season. She went on to score 10 goals in 48 league appearances.

Daniëls then moved to FC Twente, where she scored seven goals in 18 appearances. She also got the opportunity to play Champions league football. She suffered a serious injury during the 2015 Cyprus Women's Cup.

After recovering from a serious injury sustained at the 2015 Cyprus Women's Cup, Daniëls signed a short-term contract with RSC Anderlecht. After success she re-signed with the club in December 2016.

In June 2017, Daniëls joined FA WSL 1 club Bristol City. In July 2018, Daniëls left Bristol City to join Liverpool. A year after leaving, Daniëls re-signed with Bristol City in July 2019.

On 23 June 2021 it was announced that Daniëls re-signed with Liverpool after a two-year stint with Bristol City. On 6 August 2025, it was announced that Daniëls would be following former Liverpool manager Matt Beard to Burnley.

On 2 July 2026, it was announced that Daniëls had joined Wolves.

== International career ==
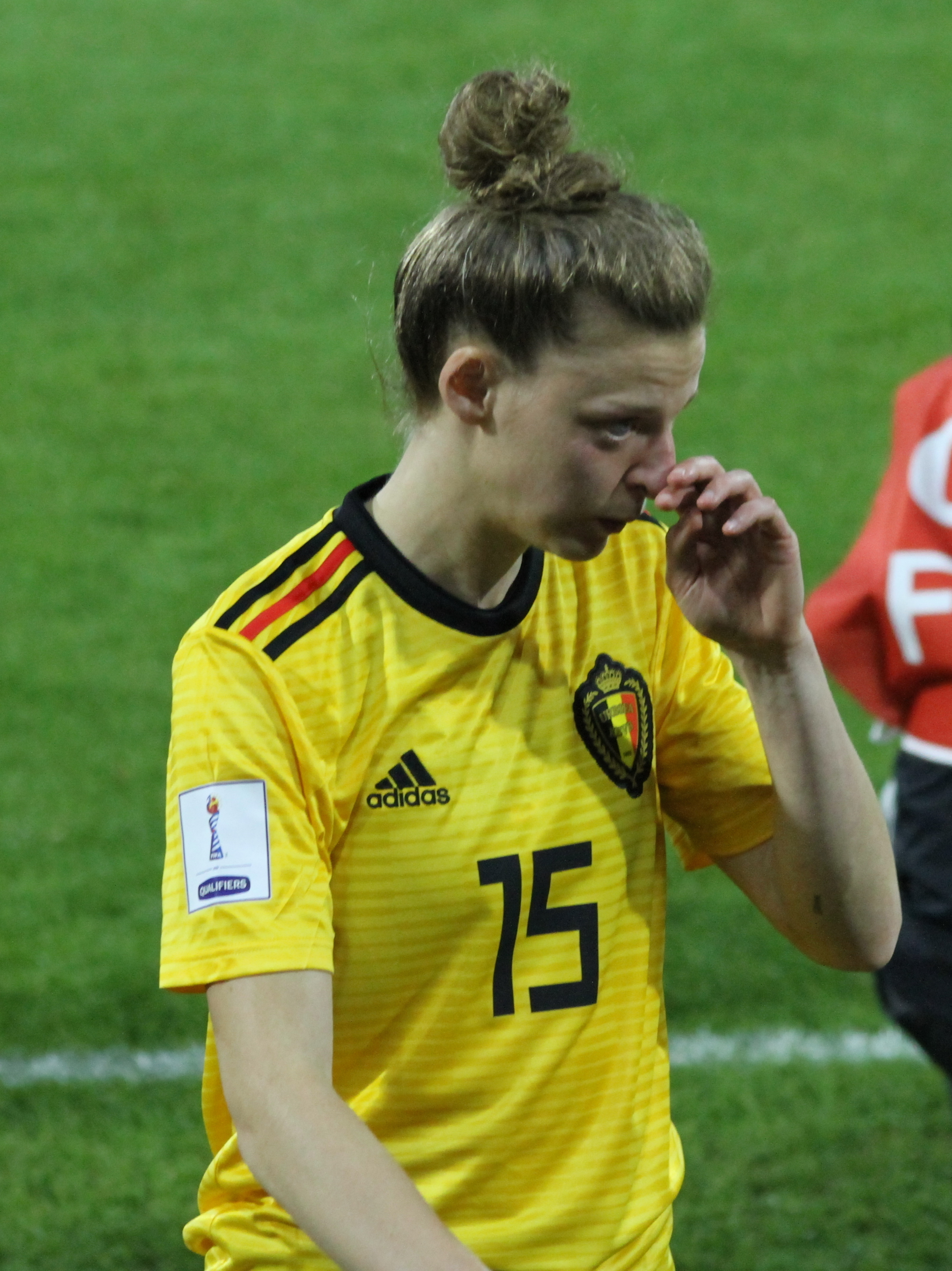
Daniëls playing for Belgium in 2018

Daniëls has represented Belgium at youth level, scoring 4 goals in 9 appearances for Belgium under-17 and scoring 3 goals in 11 appearances for Belgium under-19. She has also represented Belgium's senior team more than 30 times and represented them during the 2017 UEFA Women's Championship.

At the start of 2022, Daniels helped Belgium win the Pinatar Cup in Spain for the first time, beating Russia on penalties in the final after a 0–0 draw.

== Personal life ==
Yana Daniëls is in a relationship with her teammate Jasmine Matthews.

In 2015, Daniëls spent time working as a zookeeper while recovering from injury. She also maintains a side career as a carpenter, running her own business called The Woodcycle, and in 2025 designed and made the trophy cases for the Player of the Match awards at that summer's UEFA Women's Championship.

== Honours ==
FC Twente

Winner

- KNVB Women's Cup: 2014–15

Runners-up

- BeNe League: 2014–15

Lierse SK

Runners-up

- Belgian Women's Super Cup: 2012–13

Belgium

- Pinatar Cup: 2022
