= 2021–22 FA Women's Championship =

FA Women's Championship
- Season: 2021–22
- Champions: Liverpool
- Relegated: Watford
- Matches: 126
- Goals: 355 (2.82 per match)
- Top goalscorer: Abi Harrison (17 goals)
- Biggest home win: Liverpool 6–1 Sheffield United (24 April 2022)
- Biggest away win: Blackburn Rovers 0–6 Liverpool (9 January 2022)
- Highest scoring: Crystal Palace 4–3 Bristol City (29 August 2021); Liverpool 6–1 Sheffield United (24 April 2022)
- Longest winning run: 7 matches Liverpool
- Longest unbeaten run: 20 matches Liverpool
- Longest winless run: 9 matches Coventry United; Watford
- Longest losing run: 6 matches Watford
- Average attendance: 553

The 2021–22 FA Women's Championship was the fourth season of the rebranded FA Women's Championship, the second tier of women's football in England. It was renamed from the FA WSL 2 which was founded in 2014.

On 3 April 2022, Liverpool clinched the league title with a 4–2 win over Bristol City, their 19th consecutive league match unbeaten dating back to a 1–0 defeat at the hands of London City Lionesses on 29 August 2021, the opening game of the season. The result earned Liverpool promotion to the top-flight FA WSL after a two season absence.

On 1 May 2022, the final day of the season, Watford were relegated to the FA Women's National League after only one season in the Championship following a 1–0 defeat at home to relegation rivals Coventry United. Watford started the day two points ahead of Coventry knowing a draw would secure their Championship status. Coventry had not been off the bottom of the table since they were handed a 10 point deduction on 6 January 2022. A 90+7 minute free kick from Mollie Green was the only goal of the game at Vicarage Road as Coventry United finished the season on an eight-game unbeaten streak to remain in the second tier.

== Teams ==
Location of clubs for the 2021–22 season

Twelve teams competed in the Championship for the 2021–22 season, an increase of one team from the previous season. This was a planned progression of the restructuring of the English women's game, a move prompted to provide for a fully professional Women's Super League (WSL) starting with the 2018–19 season. The expansion was originally scheduled from the 2019–20 season but the demotion of Yeovil Town directly from the WSL to the third-tier in 2019 and then the season's curtailment the following year as a result of the COVID-19 pandemic had twice delayed this.

Movement between the WSL and Championship was granted on purely sporting merit as both the 2020–21 FA WSL and Championship seasons were completed in full. Leicester City earned promotion and their place was taken by Bristol City who were relegated after finishing bottom of the WSL. London Bees finished bottom of the 2020–21 Championship and were relegated to the National League. Upward movement from the National League was granted via application based on a set criteria including points-per-game over the previous two seasons in order to support the stability and integrity of the women's football pyramid after the previous two National League seasons had both been curtailed due to the COVID-19 pandemic. As a result, Sunderland were promoted from the National League North and Watford were promoted from the National League South.

On 24 December 2021, directors at Coventry United confirmed the club was going into voluntary liquidation. They had accelerated the team into becoming fully-professional prior to the start of the season. With a formal deadline set for 4 January 2022, investor Lewis Taylor made a bid to acquire the club and clear the debts to ensure the club could complete the season. The offer was accepted and the club was rescued although the FA handed down a 10 points deduction for triggering an insolvency event.

Team	Location	Ground	Capacity	2020–21 season
Blackburn Rovers	Bamber Bridge	Sir Tom Finney Stadium	3,000	9th
Bristol City	Failand	Robins High Performance Centre		WSL, 12th
Charlton Athletic	Bexley	The Oakwood	1,180	8th
Coventry United	Coventry	Butts Park Arena	4,000	10th
Crystal Palace	Bromley	Hayes Lane	5,000	7th
Durham	Durham	Maiden Castle	3,000	2nd
Liverpool	Birkenhead	Prenton Park	16,547	3rd
Lewes	Lewes	The Dripping Pan	3,000	5th
London City Lionesses	Dartford	Princes Park	4,100	6th
Sheffield United	Chesterfield	Technique Stadium	10,504	4th
Sunderland	Hetton-le-Hole	Eppleton CW	2,500	WNL North, N/A
Watford	Kings Langley	The Orbital Fasteners Stadium	1,500	WNL South, N/A

=== Managerial changes ===
Team	Outgoing manager	Manner of departure	Date of vacancy	Position in table	Incoming manager	Date of appointment
Bristol City	(England) Matt Beard (interim)	End of interim period	13 May 2021	End of season (FA WSL, 12th)	(Wales) Lauren Smith (Note: Smith was initially appointed as interim manager, but the move was made permanent on 6 October 2021.)	21 June 2021
Liverpool	(England) Amber Whiteley (interim)	End of interim period	13 May 2021	End of season (3rd)	(England) Matt Beard	13 May 2021
Lewes	(England) Simon Parker	Sacked	12 October 2021	8th	(Wales) Craig Gill (interim)	13 October 2021
Watford	(England) Clinton Lancaster	Sacked	31 December 2021	12th	(England) Gifton Noel-Williams (interim)	31 December 2021

== Table ==
Pos	Team	Pld	W	D	L	GF	GA	GD	Pts	Qualification
1	Liverpool (C, P)	22	16	4	2	49	11	+38	52	Promotion to the WSL (Note: Dependent on obtaining a licence.)
2	London City Lionesses	22	13	2	7	35	22	+13	41	
3	Bristol City	22	11	4	7	43	28	+15	37	
4	Crystal Palace	22	11	4	7	35	39	−4	37	
5	Charlton Athletic	22	10	4	8	27	18	+9	34	
6	Durham	22	10	4	8	30	28	+2	34	
7	Sheffield United	22	9	6	7	34	31	+3	33	
8	Lewes	22	9	2	11	23	24	−1	29	
9	Sunderland	22	6	6	10	23	32	−9	24	
10	Blackburn Rovers	22	5	2	15	17	41	−24	17	
11	Coventry United	22	5	7	10	18	32	−14	12 (Note: Coventry United were deducted 10 points on 6 January 2022 for triggering an insolvency event.)	
12	Watford (R)	22	2	5	15	18	46	−28	11	Relegation to the Southern Premier Division

Rules for classification: 1) Points; 2) Goal difference; 3) Number of goals scored
(C) Champions; (P) Promoted; (R) Relegated

== Results ==
Home \ Away	BLB	BRI	CHA	COV	CRY	DUR	LEW	LIV	LCL	SHU	SUN	WAT
Blackburn Rovers	—	0–1	0–3	3–2	1–2	1–2	1–0	0–6	1–2	2–0	2–1	3–1
Bristol City	3–0	—	0–2	1–1	4–0	0–2	2–1	2–4	1–3	5–1	2–1	3–1
Charlton Athletic	2–0	2–1	—	3–1	0–1	2–1	1–0	0–1	2–0	0–0	0–1	3–0
Coventry United	1–0	1–1	1–1	—	2–3	1–0	1–0	0–2	0–1	0–3	0–1	1–1
Crystal Palace	2–1	4–3	3–2	0–1	—	3–1	3–1	0–4	1–5	0–0	1–1	2–1
Durham	3–1	0–3	2–0	0–0	2–3	—	2–0	0–2	1–0	1–1	3–0	2–1
Lewes	1–0	0–3	2–0	4–1	2–0	0–0	—	2–1	1–0	0–2	2–0	1–2
Liverpool	0–0	0–0	0–0	3–0	2–1	3–0	2–0	—	0–1	6–1	3–0	1–0
London City Lionesses	3–1	2–3	2–0	2–2	2–1	1–2	1–0	1–1	—	1–0	3–1	2–1
Sheffield United	4–0	1–0	0–0	3–1	2–2	3–1	1–3	0–2	2–1	—	1–4	3–0
Sunderland	2–0	2–2	2–0	0–0	0–1	0–2	1–1	1–3	0–2	2–2	—	2–1
Watford	0–0	0–3	0–4	0–1	2–2	3–3	0–2	2–3	1–0	0–4	1–1	—

Source: FA WSL
Legend: Blue = home team win; Yellow = draw; Red = away team win.

== Season statistics ==
=== Top scorers ===
As of 1 May 2022

Rank	Player	Club	Goals
1	(Scotland) Abi Harrison	Bristol City	17
2	(Republic of Ireland) Leanne Kiernan	Liverpool	13
3	(England) Courtney Sweetman-Kirk	Sheffield United	11
4	(England) Beth Hepple	Durham	10
5	(United States) Katie Stengel	Liverpool	8
5	(England) Lucy Watson	Sheffield United	8
7	(Scotland) Amy Rodgers	London City Lionesses	7
7	(England) Katie Wilkinson	Coventry United	7
9	(England) Rio Hardy	Coventry United	6
9	(England) Molly Sharpe	Crystal Palace	6

== Awards ==
=== Annual awards ===
Award	Winner	Club
Golden boot	(Scotland) Abi Harrison	Bristol City
Golden glove	(England) Rachael Laws	Liverpool

== See also ==
- 2021–22 FA Women's League Cup
- 2021–22 FA WSL (tier 1)
- 2021–22 FA Women's National League (tier 3 & 4)
