= Amber Whiteley =

English football manager

Team information
- Current team: Liverpool (assistant)

Managerial career
- Years: Team
- Sunderland U21
- 2017–2019: Sunderland (assistant)
- 2020: Liverpool U21
- 2020–: Liverpool (assistant)
- 2021: Liverpool (interim manager)
- 2025: Republic of Ireland (assistant)
- 2025: Liverpool (interim manager)

Amber Whiteley is an English professional football manager who is an assistant coach for Women's Super League club Liverpool. She has previously served as Liverpool’s interim manager on two different occasions.

== Managerial career ==
While attending Northumbria University in pursuit of a degree in sports science, Whiteley became the school's head of women's football. Later on in her time at Northumbria, she was hired as the head coach of Sunderland's under-21 squad. From 2017 to 2019, she worked with Sunderland's senior team as an assistant coach. She spent a total of 6 years with the club. Whiteley also gained experience on the technical staff of the England under-18 national team, where she worked under longtime manager Mo Marley.

In January 2020, Whiteley was hired by Women's Super League club Liverpool. She started off coaching the under-21s and serving as the technical director for the LFC Women Regional Talent Club. On 7 December 2020, she was promoted to be an assistant coach for Liverpool's WSL first team. One month later, Liverpool head coach Vicky Jepson departed from the club on a mutual contract termination, leaving Whiteley to step in as interim manager. Over the subsequent months, Whiteley helped Liverpool regain a sense of form and was rewarded by recognition as the March 2021 FA Women’s Championship Manager of the Month. She returned to her assistant position after Matt Beard was chosen as manager in May 2021.

On 11 February 2025, the Republic of Ireland national team announced that they had hired Whiteley to join Carla Ward's coaching staff ahead of the 2025 UEFA Women's Nations League campaign. Whiteley went on to contribute to Ireland's journey throughout the year, both in the Nations League and in friendlies, while still maintaining her role at Liverpool.

Matt Beard was removed as Liverpool manager on 27 February 2025, resulting in Whiteley getting promoted to interim manager for a second time. From the beginning of her caretaker stint, Whiteley expressed interest in earning the permanent job. In her first game in charge, she led Liverpool to beat Crystal Palace, 1–0. She then piloted the team to two more wins, including a 3–1 victory over Manchester United in the Liverpool women's team's first-ever WSL victory at Anfield, and became the first-ever Liverpool manager to register a win in both of their first two games at the helm. She led Liverpool to finish the season in 7th place and make a FA Cup semifinal appearance. Ultimately, Whiteley was not selected to manage Liverpool on a permanent basis and instead became a member of Gareth Taylor's coaching staff once he was hired in August 2025.
