= Liverpool F.C. Women =

Liverpool F.C. women's football team

Liverpool
- Full name: Liverpool Football Club Women
- Nickname: The Reds
- Founded: 1989; 37 years ago as Newton Ladies F.C.
- Ground: BrewDog Stadium; Anfield (Selected home matches)
- Capacity: 18,000 (BrewDog Stadium); 61,015 (Anfield)
- Owner(s): Fenway Sports Group (62%); 1892 Holdings (38%)
- Chairman: Tom Werner
- Head coach: Gareth Taylor
- League: Women's Super League
- 2025–26: WSL, 11th of 12
- Website: liverpoolfc.com/women
Home colours	Away colours	Third colours

Liverpool Football Club, commonly referred to as Liverpool or Liverpool Football Club Women if distinguishing themselves from the men's team, is a professional English women's football team based in St Helens, Merseyside, England. They have served as the official women's division of Liverpool Football Club since 1994. Founded in 1989 as Newton Ladies F.C. and subsequently renamed Knowsley United W.F.C., Liverpool Ladies and Liverpool F.C. Women over the years. The club was a founding member of the top-tier Women's Super League in 2011. A year later, Liverpool became the first English football club to offer every female player full-time professional contracts. This decision pioneered the professionalisation of women's football in England and led to Liverpool winning back to back Women's Super League titles in 2013 and 2014. In 2022, they also won the FA Women's Championship, earning promotion back to the Women's Super League, having done so three times previously in 2003–04, 2006–07, 2009–10.

== History ==
=== Formation and early years ===
The club was founded in 1989 as Newton LFC, by former England international, Liz Deighan. The club rechristened as Knowsley United WFC two years later; becoming the founding members of the National Premier Division organised by the WFA. Knowsley United reached the final of the Premier League Cup in 1993, but lost to Arsenal at Wembley. The local MP, Eddie O'Hara, tabled an Early Day Motion congratulating the club on extending the annual sequence of Merseyside clubs playing in Cup finals at Wembley. In 1994, the club reached the final of the FA Women's Cup, but lost 1–0 to Doncaster Belles at Glanford Park.

In mid-1994, the club linked with Liverpool F.C. and took on the name Liverpool Ladies F.C.

The club finished runners-up in the following two FA Women's Cups. They lost the 1995 final 3–2 to Arsenal at Prenton Park; after twice being ahead through Karen Burke goals, Marieanne Spacey scored a late winner for Arsenal. In the 1996 final, Liverpool and their 15-year-old goalkeeper Rachel Brown, drew 1–1 with Croydon at The Den, but ultimately lost on penalties after extra time.

For most of the 1990s Liverpool were National Premier League mainstays but a lack of support and investment saw them relegated to the Northern Division in 2003. In 2004, they won the Northern Division and earned promotion, but did not stay long as they were relegated again at the end of the season, having won only two games.

Their biggest rivalries were with Everton, but their spells in the second tier led them to develop rivalries with counterparts of male rivals in the lower tiers, such as Tranmere Rovers. The Merseyside derby was rekindled in the 2007–08 season, after Liverpool won back promotion as 2006–07 Northern Division champions.

Surviving their first season back in the FA Women's Premier League National Division, finishing third bottom, they sacked manager David Bradley at the end of the season. The club were relegated into the Northern Division for 2009–10, but won the league losing just one game all season. Liverpool also won the FA Fair Play Award after playing for the whole season without having a single player booked or sent-off.

Liverpool was one of eight founding teams in the Women's Super League in April 2011.

In June 2012, the manager for four seasons Robbie Johnson stepped down from his position. Under Johnson, the team won just two of their 20 games in his last two seasons in charge, having finished bottom in 2011, and with a similar record in 2012. Johnson's assistant Andy Williams was subsequently promoted to the manager's role.

=== Full time professional era and title winning years ===
In August 2012, former Chelsea manager Matt Beard was appointed manager on a full-time contract until 2014. When the club finished bottom of the WSL for the second successive season, Beard overhauled his squad by releasing ten players and making high-profile signings including United States national team defender Whitney Engen. The club then announced a move from the West Lancashire College Stadium in Skelmersdale, to the Halton Stadium in Widnes for 2013. In April 2013, Liverpool became the first football club in England to offer their female athletes professional contracts, pioneering the professionalisation of the women's game in England. This ultimately helped lead Liverpool to end Arsenal's nine year dominance and on 29 September 2013, Liverpool won their first top flight title, winning the Women's Super League by beating Bristol City in the end-of-season decider. They retained the title on 12 October 2014 by beating Bristol City 3–0 despite entering the final day in third behind Chelsea and Birmingham City. During that season, Liverpool made their UEFA Women's Champions League debut but were knocked out in the round of 32.

During the 2013 and 2014 title winning seasons, then men's first team manager Brendan Rodgers showed his support to the Women's first team. He believed in the one club mentality with everybody at all levels of the football club being of equal importance. Working alongside Matt Beard, both men and women's first teams would regularly train together at Melwood. In the days leading up to the Bristol City game which would see the women go on and clinch their first title, Rodgers said:

"It's brilliant how well they have done and it's a great effort by all of the players. I met with Matt in pre-season and understood what was a huge task for them but they have had a brilliant season, and now they head into the last game with the title in their hands - which is all you could ever want. We had the chance to work with them here at Melwood and you could see the professionalism. They wanted to do it right and all the staff were brilliant, and very importantly the quality was very good on the day as well. I'm delighted for them. We've tried to make sure we have drawn everyone into the one-club mentality this season. I said to Matt no matter how they do on Sunday, we are very proud of them. The work he's done, his staff and the players, they have been brilliant and they have been right up there at the top of the league all season. It's a game that if you win it, the memories can live with you for a lifetime, and they can go and celebrate then rightly so - so we are hoping they can do that on Sunday. We are all very proud of their achievements and what they have done this season. It has been a great effort and the biggest message is: It's in your hands so go and do what you have done all season and play for the win. If you do that, the quality and determination will come through and let's hope on Sunday night we are all celebrating the title by the women."

In September 2015, it was announced that Matt Beard was leaving the club at the conclusion of the 2015 season to take charge of Boston Breakers in the United States. Liverpool had a difficult season, plagued by players' injuries and managing a 7th-place finish in the FA WSL, semifinals of the FA WSL Cup, fifth round of the FA Women's Cup and round of 32 of the Women's Champions League. In October 2015, Scott Rogers, who was Matt Beard's assistant coach, was officially appointed as manager.

In July 2018, the club rebranded as Liverpool Football Club Women.

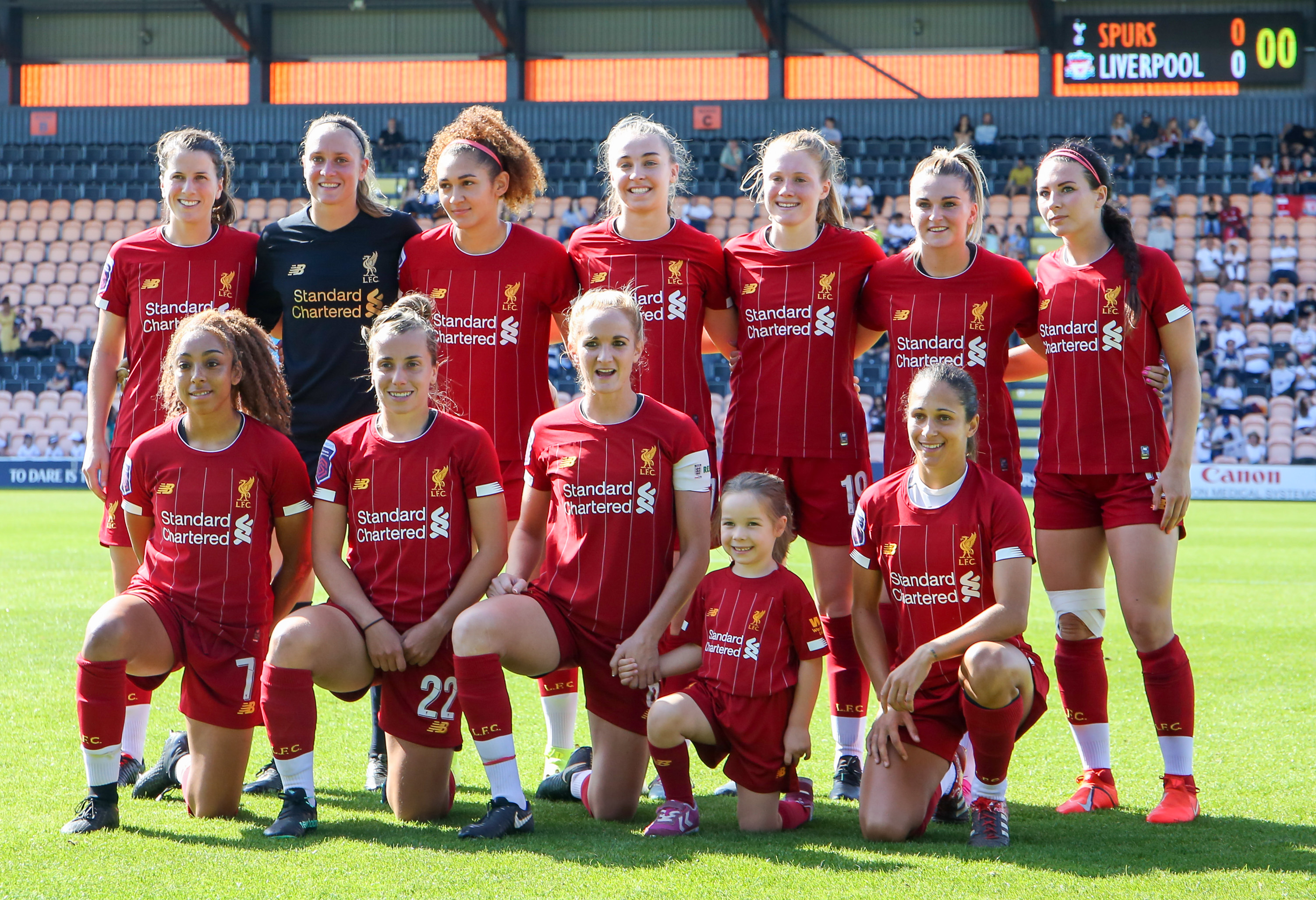
Liverpool team in September 2019 prior to a match against Tottenham Hotspur

=== Decline and resurgence ===
Over a period of several years, Liverpool never reached the heights they reached from 2013 to 2015. Not properly replacing Matt Beard, lack of funding and investment, being overlooked when the men's team moved to their new £50m facility in Kirkby and the departure of then emerging star players such as Niamh Charles, Caroline Weir, Lucy Bronze, Alex Greenwood, Shanice van de Sanden and Asisat Oshoala ultimately led Liverpool to be relegated on a points-by-game basis in the 2019–20 FA WSL season to the FA Women's Championship for a fourth time, after being in the Women's Super League since its inception.

After a great deal of backlash, the first steps were taken to rectify the mistakes made by making a number of positive changes. In September 2020, Director of Communications, Susan Black, a key member of the club's senior executive team, was appointed as executive director of Liverpool FC Women in addition to her role. Black was also appointed to the board of Liverpool FC Women alongside Billy Hogan, the club's Chief Executive Officer. During her time at the club, Black has had an extensive portfolio working on multiple projects. From equality, diversity and inclusion programs, to overseeing the club's social responsibility programme, Red Neighbours initiative and a board member of the LFC Foundation.

In the 2020–21 FA Women's Championship season, Liverpool Women finished 3rd, after a 1–1 draw at home to Blackburn Rovers narrowly ended their promotion hopes. Midway through the season, manager Vicky Jepson left the club by mutual consent. Assistant manager Amber Whiteley took charge on an interim basis.

In May 2021, former manager Matt Beard, who led Liverpool to back to back Women's Super League titles seven years prior, was reappointed Liverpool Women's manager. Beards's start in his second stint with the club proved to be a success. In his first season, Liverpool won the 2021–22 FA Women's Championship in stunning fashion winning sixteen out of their twenty two league games, earning their promotion back to the FA Women's Super League. Upon securing promotion Liverpool men's first team manager Jürgen Klopp said :

"Obviously, Liverpool was in the last years not famous for treating or dealing with women's football outstandingly well. They didn't go down to the Championship for no reason....Now they are back and we have to make sure that we use the situation. It is a wonderful team, great coach and I'm really happy for them to get promoted."

Shortly following Matt Beard's reappointment as Women's first team manager, further positive changes were made by the club. Liverpool appointed Russ Fraser as Liverpool FC Women's first managing director in October 2021. Fraser boasted an impressive resume in the women's side of the game with significant years of experience. He was no stranger to Beard having worked with him during his time at West Ham United Women, where he oversaw the move to the Chadwell Heath training facility. The team had enormous success, reaching the FA Cup final and consolidating their place in the top flight. Prior, Fraser was the general manager at Reading Women. Under his leadership, the team saw significant progress both on and off the pitch, including a fourth-placed finish in the Women's Super League in his final season. His final post before moving to Anfield, he spent eighteen months at Leicester City Women, where he oversaw the team's move into full-time professionalism. Off the pitch, he oversaw the first team's permanent move to the King Power Stadium and secured the club's former training ground as base for both the women's first team and academy. On the pitch, successful recruitment led to winning the Championship title securing promotion to the Women's Super League.

An overhauled Liverpool's first season back in the Women's Super League began with a win over Chelsea at home after a delayed start due to the Death and state funeral of Elizabeth II. Injuries to majority of the first team throughout the season made life difficult. However, with additions in the January transfer window wins over West Ham, Manchester City, Reading, Tottenham and Brighton helped ensure a 7th-place finish. Liverpool also reached the Quarter Finals of the League Cup and were knocked out of the fourth round of the FA Cup.

On June 8, 2023, Liverpool officially announced that it had re-purchased their former iconic training base at Melwood to once again serve as a dedicated training base as it had done for 70 years. This time it would be home to Liverpool Women's First Team,Youth teams and Category 1 Professional Game Academy (PGA) after being awarded the licence by the Football Association. To further its commitment to the women's side of the game, both men and women's divisions sported the official club crest going forward, thus ensuring all teams would be known or referred to as “Liverpool Football Club”. The Melwood facility would also continue to run community outreach programms for its award-winning LFC Foundation programmes, as well as for offering education programmes to young people via the Robbie Fowler Education and Football Academy (FEFA).

In their first season at Melwood with the first team, Liverpool Women's U21s won the Liverpool County FA Senior Cup, beating Mossley Hill Ladies 8–1 at Walton Hall Park on 7 May 2024. Their second season saw them retain the cup and complete a double by winning the league and being promoted to PGA Division 1.

== Kits, badge and Sponsorship ==
=== Kits ===
Since being brought into the Liverpool Football Club family in 1994, the Women's First Team, Youth Teams and Academy have worn the same kits as the Men's First Team. The only differences on the shirts were the shirt sponsors on the front of the shirts during brief periods between 1994-2006 and 2017–2019. From 2006 to 2017 and from 2019 to the present day, all teams representing the club wore and will wear the same kit with the same sponsors. On the back of every shirt, the 97 emblem encased by the Eternal Flames sits at the nape of the neck in memory of the men, women and children, who lost their lives in the Hillsborough tragedy.

On 27 August 2024, Liverpool for their final season with kit sponsors Nike, wore a third kit worn by both women's and men's teams, featuring a customised Nike tick which was part of Nike's ‘Together We Rise’ collection to celebrate the women's game and its acceleration in world sport, with the emphasis of a one club mentality “Two Teams, One Club”. The tick featured on the third kits worn by Liverpool, Chelsea, Tottenham, Atletico Madrid, Barcelona, Corinthians, Pumas UNAM, Club America and Inter Milan. The kits from those clubs also celebrated female artists and cultural movements that left their mark on their club and their city.

=== Badge ===
The Liverpool badge is based on the city's liver bird symbol, which in the past had been placed inside a shield. In 1977, a red liver bird standing on a football (blazoned as "Statant upon a football a Liver Bird wings elevated and addorsed holding in the beak a piece of seaweed gules") was granted as a heraldic badge by the College of Arms to the English Football League intended for use by Liverpool. However, Liverpool never made use of this badge. In 1992, to commemorate the centennial of the club, a new badge was commissioned, including a representation of the Shankly Gates. The next year twin flames were added at either side, symbolic of the Hillsborough memorial outside Anfield, where an eternal flame burns in memory of those who died in the Hillsborough disaster. In 2012, Warrior Sports' first Liverpool kit removed the shield and gates, returning the badge to what had adorned Liverpool shirts in the 1970s; the flames were moved to the back collar of the shirt, surrounding the number 97 for the number who died at Hillsborough.

=== Sponsorship ===
On 19 April 2017, the club announced a landmark shirt sponsorship deal with beauty and cosmetics company Avon Products. This three-year agreement saw Avon become an independent shirt sponsor for the club, replacing Standard Chartered from the men's side. As part of the agreement, Avon also became Liverpool Ladies FC's principal partner and ladies beauty partner.

In 2019, Standard Chartered announced a gear-change in its sponsorship of Liverpool Football Club Women's first team, moving to the front of their shirt and saw it emerge as Main Club Partner running in line with the men's first team.

In October 2022, Liverpool launched a new initiative for supporters courtesy of the club's official travel partner, Expedia. A special customised coach provided by Expedia provided free transport to fans for all of Liverpool Football Club Women's first team away matches outside of Merseyside throughout the 2022–23 Barclays Women's Super League season.

In May 2023, Liverpool announced its partnership with the Her Game Too campaign through the club's Red Together Program. Its goal is to raise awareness of and help eradicate sexism in football.

In June 2023, Liverpool and their official shirt sponsor Standard Chartered launched a new campaign titled "Play On". The aim is to inspire, empower and educate girls to participate in sport. The campaign was launched with the help of Liverpool men's first team manager Jürgen Klopp and several players from the men's first team. It is not the first time both club and sponsor collaborated to support female athletes in sport. In March 2023 at the home game against Spurs, Standard Chartered celebrated International Women's Day by hosting a range of family-friendly activities at Prenton Park.

In July 2023, Liverpool announced that the women's first team and academy would be included in the official sponsorship deal with new digital fitness partner Peloton Interactive and an extension by the club's official publication partner Kodansha alongside the men's.

On 9 August 2023, Liverpool announced a new long-term partnership with Google Pixel to become the club's official mobile phone partner, working with the club's men's and women's teams to create exclusive content on the Pixel devices for fan experiences across Anfield, Prenton Park and fans watching at home. Part of the aim of this project was to help close the visibility gap between men's and women's football, while inspiring more girls and women to get involved in the game. Both club and partner would also create a dedicated women's football show on YouTube, going behind the scenes during the Women's Super League season. A new series called 'Pitchside, Presented by Pixel' would take fans closer to each game with exclusive viewpoints from the touch lines, all shot on Google Pixel phones. Finally, Liverpool joined Pixel FC, which is a collective of dedicated women's football content creators and presenters.

On 23 September 2023, Liverpool Football Club announced that Melwood would be officially known as the ‘AXA Melwood Training Centre’. AXA, Liverpool Football Club's official training partner since 2020, would align their commitment to both the men's and women's teams. On 3 July 2024, Liverpool announced a global partnership deal with Husqvarna as its groundskeeping partner. Since 2021, the club has been using its equipment to maintain the pitches at the AXA Melwood Training Centre as well as the AXA Training Centre in Kirkby and Anfield.

On 25 June 2024, Liverpool announced a global, multi-year partnership with Japan Airlines to become its official airline partner. The deal extended to both men and women's teams.

On 8 August 2024 the club announced a global partnership with Lucozade Sport to become its official sports hydration partner. The multi-year partnership saw a range of Lucozade Sport products at Anfield, the AXA Training Centre and AXA Melwood Training Centre.

On 23 August 2024, the club announced that Ladbrokes would be its official betting partner in the UK and Ireland in a multi-year partnership. Its branding would be seen at both Anfield and St Helens Stadium.

== Club partners ==
As of 8 August 2025, Liverpool has partnerships with:

- Standard Chartered
- Adidas
- Axa
- Expedia
- Wasabi
- Carlsberg
- Nivea Men
- S. C. Johnson
- Japan Airlines
- Vistaprint
- Kodansha
- Lucozade
- Peloton
- Strauss
- Google Pixel
- Orion Innovation
- EA Sports FC
- Mauritius Tourism
- Monster Energy
- Extreme
- UPS
- Husqvarna Group
- Coca-Cola
- Cadbury
- Sorare
- Interwetten
- Ladbrokes

== Stadium ==
From the 2024–25 season onwards, Liverpool played the majority of their home matches at the Totally Wicked Stadium, the home of Super League side St Helens RFC. The stadium has a capacity of 18,000 including standing sections. A number of matches will be played at Anfield making it the semi-permanent home of the women's first team. On 3 May 2024 it was announced by the club, that they had signed a ten-year lease with St Helens RFC to host Women's Super League, Women's FA Cup and FA Women's League Cup matches, alongside Men's Youth team and academy matches. Liverpool would have sole exclusivity of the stadium from September to February each season. A number of upgrades to the stadium are to take place including the installation of a Premier League standard pitch, a bespoke dressing room and recovery area for the Women's first team and cosmetic upgrades to the stadium to accommodate LFC branding.

From 2018 to 2024, Liverpool played their home games at Prenton Park, the home of EFL League Two side Tranmere Rovers. After the Lionesses won the record breaking UEFA Women's Euro 2022, domestic attendances continued to rise for the women's side of the game throughout 2022–23 season. Liverpool's average attendance throughout the campaign was 4,758. Liverpool's highest attendance ever at Prenton Park came against Arsenal in the 2023–24 season in front of 6,085.

Liverpool's key fixture at Anfield is the Merseyside Derby against Everton. The first match took place in 1997 and has been played as an annual fixture since 2019 in the Women's Super League, with the reverse played at Goodison Park. Their second game on 25 September 2022, a club record 27,574 attended the televised Merseyside Derby against Everton. This record would go on to become the 7th highest attendance of the 2022–23 season.

== Support ==
Liverpool is one of the best supported clubs in the world. The club states that its worldwide fan base includes 300 officially recognised Supporters Clubs in 100 different countries. Notable groups for the women's first team include Spirit of Shankly, Liverpool Women's Supporters Club, Liverpool Disabled Supporters Association and Kop Outs. Liverpool fans often refer to themselves as Kopites, a reference to the fans who once stood, and now sit, on the Kop at Anfield.

The song "You'll Never Walk Alone", originally from the Rodgers and Hammerstein musical Carousel and later recorded by Liverpool musicians Gerry and the Pacemakers, is the club's anthem and has been sung by the Anfield crowd since the early 1960s. It has since gained popularity among fans of other clubs around the world. The song's title adorns the top of the Shankly Gates, which were unveiled on 2 August 1982 in memory of former manager Bill Shankly. The "You'll Never Walk Alone" portion of the Shankly Gates is also reproduced on the club's badge.

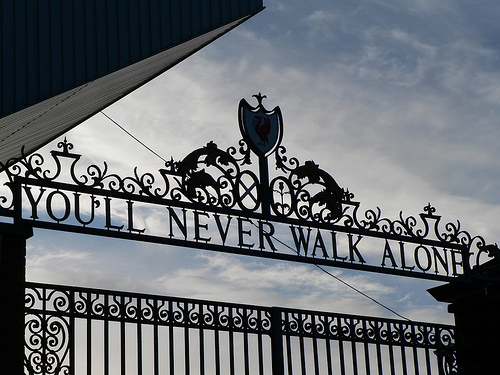
The Shankly Gates, erected in honour of former manager Bill Shankly

Many of the families who began supporting the Women's team since being incorporated into the club in 1994, lost loved ones in the Hillsborough disaster. The disaster took place during the men's FA Cup semi-final between Liverpool and Nottingham Forest at Hillsborough Stadium, Sheffield, on 15 April 1989. Ninety-seven Liverpool fans died as a consequence of overcrowding at the Leppings Lane end, in what became known as the Hillsborough disaster. In the following days, The Sun's coverage of the event spread falsehoods, particularly an article entitled "The Truth" that claimed that Liverpool fans had robbed the dead and had urinated on and attacked the police. Subsequent investigations proved the allegations false, leading to a boycott of the newspaper by Liverpool fans across the city and elsewhere; many still refuse to buy The Sun 30 years later. Many support organisations were set up in the wake of the disaster, such as the Hillsborough Justice Campaign, which represents bereaved families, survivors and supporters in their efforts to secure justice.

== Players ==
=== First-team squad ===
As of 14 August 2026

Note: Flags indicate national team as defined under FIFA eligibility rules; some limited exceptions apply. Players may hold more than one non-FIFA nationality.

No.	Pos.	Nation	Player
1	GK	ENG	Rachael Laws
2	DF	ENG	Lucy Parry
4	DF	ENG	Grace Fisk (captain)
6	MF	ESP	Natalia Ramos
7	FW	SWE	Cornelia Kapocs
8	MF	JPN	Fūka Nagano
9	FW	GER	Vivien Endemann
10	FW	NOR	Sophie Román Haug
11	FW	SWE	Beata Olsson
12	GK	ENG	Khiara Keating
13	FW	ENG	Mia Enderby
14	MF	AUT	Marie Höbinger
16	DF	WAL	Lily Woodham

No.	Pos.	Nation	Player
17	DF	SCO	Jenna Clark
18	MF	WAL	Ceri Holland
19	MF	SCO	Kirsty Maclean
21	FW	NOR	Anna Jøsendal
22	GK	ENG	Faye Kirby
23	DF	SLO	Sara Agrež
24	MF	SCO	Sam Kerr
25	DF	SWE	Alice Bergström
26	MF	JPN	Mao Itamura
27	FW	SUI	Aurélie Csillag
28	DF	ENG	Mari Ward
29	DF	ESP	Alejandra Bernabé
36	MF	ENG	Zara Shaw

=== Out on loan ===
Note: Flags indicate national team as defined under FIFA eligibility rules; some limited exceptions apply. Players may hold more than one non-FIFA nationality.

No.	Pos.	Nation	Player
6	MF	IRL	Denise O'Sullivan (at Gotham FC until 30 June 2027)
—	GK	GER	Rafaela Borggräfe (at Bayer 04 Leverkusen until 30 June 2027)

=== Former players ===
For details of current and former players, see Category:Liverpool F.C. Women players.

=== Club captains ===
Period between 2012–present from when Liverpool Football Club professionalised the women's first team by offering their players full-time contracts.

Name	Period
(England) Gemma Bonner	2012–2018
(England) Sophie Bradley-Auckland	2018–2020
(Republic of Ireland) Niamh Fahey	2020–2025
(England) Grace Fisk	2025–present

== Club officials ==
As of 30 September 2026

- Owner: (United States) Fenway Sports Group
- Ambassadors: (Wales) Ian Rush, (England) Robbie Fowler, (England) Michael Owen, (England) John Barnes, (England) Natasha Dowie

=== Fenway Sports Group and FSG International ===
- Principal owner: (United States) John W. Henry
- FSG Chairman: (United States) Tom Werner
- CEO of Football: (England) Michael Edwards
- CEO of FSG International: (United States) Billy Hogan
- Managing Director: (England) Andy Hughes
- Chief Commercial Officer: International: (England) Kate Pratt-Theobald
- Chief Financial Officer, Executive Board Member: (England) Jenny Beacham
- Chief Legal and External Affairs Officer, Board Member LFC Foundation: (England) Jonathan Bamber
- Technical Co-Ordinator: (Republic of Ireland) Niamh Fahey

=== Liverpool Football Club ===
- Directors: (United States) John W. Henry, (United States) Tom Werner, (United States) Michael Gordon, (England) Peter Moore, (England) Michael Egan
- Non-Executive Director: (Scotland) Kenny Dalglish
- Director of Impact: (England) Rishi Jain
- Senior Vice Presidential of Communications: (England) Craig Evans
- Managing Director: (England) Andy O’Boyle
- Head of Recruitment: (England) Rob Clarkson

=== Coaching and medical staff ===
- Head coach: (Wales) Gareth Taylor
- Assistant coach: (England) Chad Gribble
- Assistant coach: (England) Amber Whiteley
- Assistant Coach: (England) Niamh Russell
- Goalkeeping coach: (England) Andy Lonergan
- Lead Performance Analyst: (England) Jordan Kevan
- Data Analyst: (England) Noah Sansbury
- Assistant Performance Analyst: (England) Marcus Wilkinson
- Lead Physiotherapist: (England) Hina Chauhan
- Strength and Conditioning Coach: (England) Colm Smith
- Individual Performance Coach: (England) Nicky Ajose
- Sports Therapist: (England) Chris Underwood
- Assistant Physiotherapist: (England) Alexandra Hadjiminas
- Club doctor: (England) Amelia Woodhouse
- Performance Wellbeing Lead: (England) Morag Murray
- Performance Nutritionist: (England) Nathan Hobday
- Kit and Equipment Manager:

=== Academy Staff ===
- Head of ProGame Academy and U21 Manager: (England) Simon O’Neill
- Professional Game Academy (PGA) Under-21 Head Coach: (Republic of Ireland) Megan Campbell
- Education Lead: (England) Leandra Little

== Managerial History ==
Dates	Name	Notes	Ref
1989–1993	Elizabeth "Liz" Deighan		
1993–1995	Angie Gallimore	Player-manager	
1995–1996	Joby Humphries		
1996–1997	Paul Ashley		
1997–2001	Barbara Nodwell		
2001	Craig Boyd		
2001–2005	John Williams		
2005–2007	Keith Cliffe		
2007–2008	David Bradley		
2008–2012	Robbie Johnson		
2012–2015	Matt Beard		
2015–2018	Scott Rogers		
2018	Neil Redfearn		
2018	Chris Kirkland	Caretaker	
2018–2021	Vicky Jepson		
2021	Amber Whiteley	Caretaker	
2021–2025	Matt Beard		
2025	Amber Whiteley	Interim	
2025–present	Gareth Taylor		

== Seasons ==
Season	League									Women's FA Cup	FA Women's League Cup	UWCL	League Top Scorer	
Season	Tier	Pld	W	D	L	GF	GA	Pts	Pos	Women's FA Cup	FA Women's League Cup	UWCL	Name(s)	Goals
1991–92	1	14	6	5	3	31	30	17	4th					
1992–93	1	18	11	1	6	37	33	23	3rd		Runners-Up			
1993–94	1	18	13	2	3	63	30	41	3rd	Runners-Up				
1994–95	1	18	12	3	3	58	17	39	2nd	Runners-Up				
1995–96	1	18	9	2	7	36	27	29	5th	Runners-Up				
1996–97	1	18	9	3	6	30	16	30	4th				Karen Burke; Shirley Oakford	8
1997–98	1	18	8	3	7	33	25	27	6th	Third Round				
1998–99	1	18	6	2	10	28	27	20	6th					
1999–00	1	18	4	4	10	15	38	16	8th					
2000–01	1	18	0	0	18	13	89	0	10th					
2001–02	2	20	8	6	6	41	27	30	5th			DNQ		
2002–03	2	22	7	8	7	37	32	29	6th			DNQ		
2003–04	2	20	15	5	0	51	12	50	1st (Champions)			DNQ		
2004–05	1	18	3	2	13	21	49	11	9th	Fifth Round	Semi-finals	DNQ	Louise Hastie	9
2005–06	2	22	15	3	4	39	17	48	2nd		First Round	DNQ	Jade Thomas	12
2006–07	2	22	16	2	4	56	17	50	1st (Champions)			DNQ	Gillian Hart	13
2007–08	1	22	6	4	12	31	51	22	10th		Semi-finals	DNQ	Joanne Traynor	5
2008–09	1	22	4	4	14	28	63	16	11th			DNQ	Cheryl Foster	12
2009–10	2	22	19	2	1	59	19	59	1st (Champions)	Fourth Round	First Round	DNQ	Cheryl Foster	16
2010–11	1	14	1	4	9	10	26	7	8th	Semi-finals	Quarter-finals	DNQ	Katie Brusell; Nicola Harding	2
2011–12	1	14	1	2	11	15	35	5	8th	Fifth Round	Group Stage	DNQ	Hannah Keryakoplis; Kelly Jones	3
2012–13	1	14	12	0	2	46	19	36	1st (Champions)	Semi-finals	Semi-finals	DNQ	Natasha Dowie	13
2013–14	1	14	7	5	2	19	10	26	1st (Champions)	Sixth Round	Group Stage	Round of 32	Fara Williams; Gemma Davison	4
2014–15	1	14	4	1	9	15	24	13	7th	Fifth Round	Semi-finals	Round of 32	Natasha Dowie	4
2015–16	1	16	7	4	5	27	23	25	5th	Fifth Round	Quarter-finals	DNQ	Caroline Weir	7
2016–17	1	8	4	2	2	20	18	14	4th	Semi-finals		DNQ	Caroline Weir	5
2017–18	1	18	9	1	8	30	27	28	6th	Quarter-finals	Quarter-finals	DNQ	Bethany England	10
2018–19	1	20	7	1	12	21	38	22	8th	Quarter-finals	Group Stage	DNQ	Courtney Sweetman-Kirk	10
2019–20	1	14	1	3	10	8	20	6	12th	Fifth Round	Group Stage	DNQ	Rachel Furness	5
2020–21	2	20	11	6	3	37	15	39	3rd	Fourth Round	Group Stage	DNQ	Rinsola Babajide; Rachel Furness	5
2021–22	2	22	16	4	2	49	11	52	1st (Champions)	Fifth Round	Quarter-finals	DNQ	Leanne Kiernan	13
2022–23	1	22	6	5	11	24	39	23	7th	Fourth Round	Quarter-finals	DNQ	Katie Stengel	9
2023–24	1	22	12	5	5	36	28	41	4th	Quarter-finals	Group Stage	DNQ	Sophie Román Haug	7
2024–25	1	22	7	4	11	22	37	25	7th	Semi-finals	Group Stage	DNQ	Olivia Smith	7
2025–26	1	22	4	5	13	21	34	17	11th	Semi-finals	Quarter-finals	DNQ	Beata Olsson	6

=== Record in UEFA Women's Champions League ===
All results (away, home and aggregate) list Liverpool FC Women's goal tally first.

Season	Round	Opponents	Home	Away	Aggregate	Scorers
2014–15	Round of 32	(Sweden) Linköpings	2–1	0–3	2–4	Gemma Davison, Natasha Dowie
2015–16	Round of 32	(Italy) Brescia	0–1	0–1	0–2	–

== Honours ==
=== Official ===
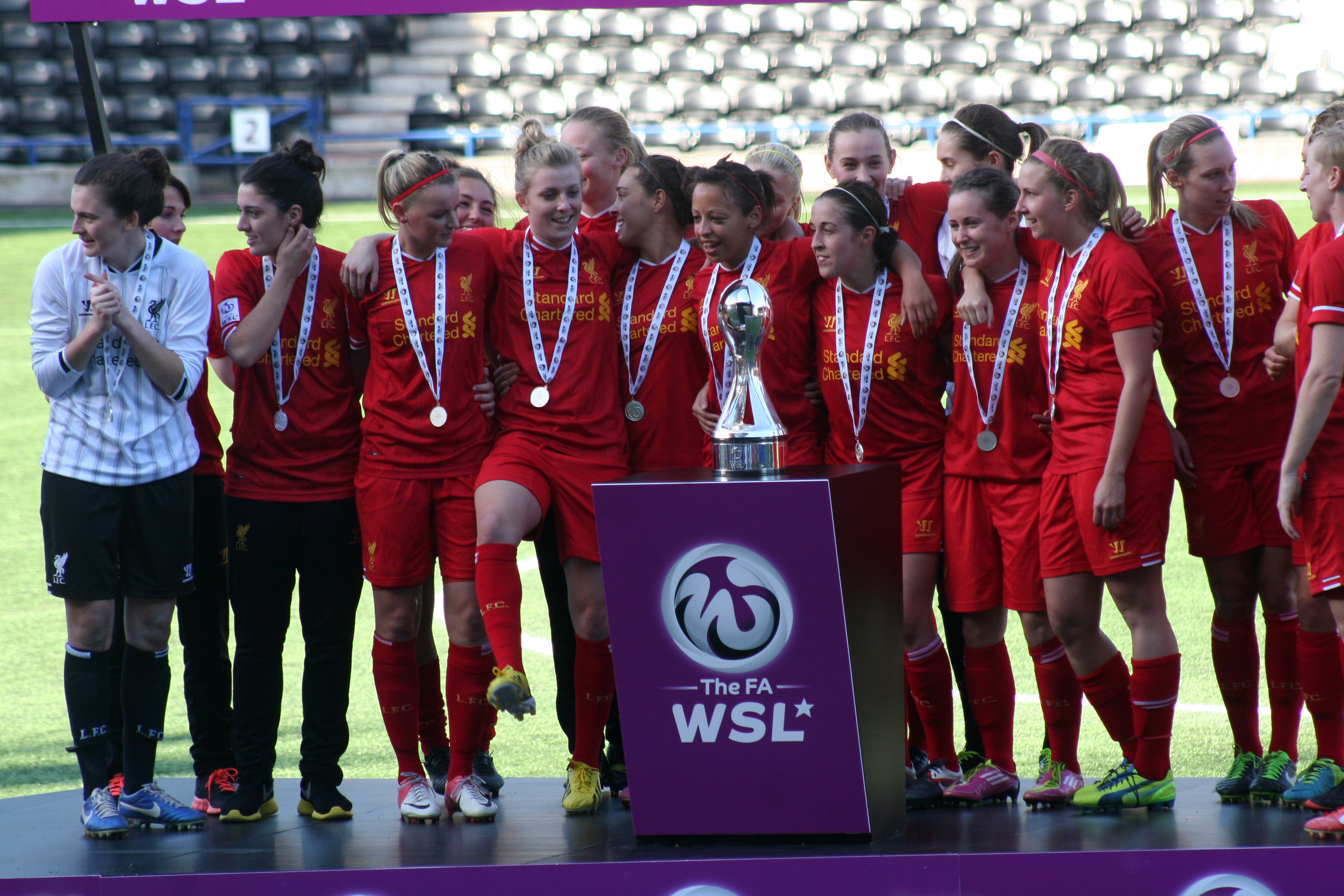
2013 FA WSL Championship celebration

Type	Competition	Titles	Winning Seasons	Runners-up
Domestic	Women's Super League	2	2013, 2014	1994–95
Domestic	Women's FA Cup	0		1993–94, 1994–95, 1995–96
Domestic	WSL Players Cup	0		
Domestic	Women's FA Community Shield	0		
Domestic	Women's Super League 2	4	2003–04, 2006–07, 2009–10, 2021–22	2005–06
Domestic	FA Women's National League Cup	0		1992–93
Continental	UEFA Women's Champions League	0		
Regional / Minor	Keele Classic	1	2010	
Regional / Minor	Preston Tournament	1	2010	

=== Recognitions ===
- FA Club of the Year
  - Winners (1): 2014
