= 2020–21 Sheffield United W.F.C. season =

Sheffield United
2020–21 season
- Chairman: Lee Walshaw
- Head Coach: Neil Redfearn
- Stadium: Technique Stadium, Chesterfield
- Championship: 4th
- FA Cup: Fifth round
- League Cup: Group stage
- Top goalscorer: League: Katie Wilkinson (19); All: Katie Wilkinson (20)
Home colours	Away colours	Third colours

The 2020–21 Sheffield United W.F.C. season was the club's 19th season and their third in the FA Women's Championship, the second level of the women's football pyramid. Outside of the league, the club also contested two domestic cup competitions: the FA Cup and the League Cup.

Prior to the start of the season, on 7 July 2020, Sheffield United announced they had parted ways with manager Carla Ward after "both parties opted to go down a different path." Neil Redfearn was announced as the new manager on 28 August.

== Squad ==
As of 23 April 2021.

Note: Flags indicate national team as defined under FIFA eligibility rules; some limited exceptions apply. Players may hold more than one non-FIFA nationality.

No.	Pos.	Nation	Player
2	DF	(England) ENG	Ellie Wilson
3	DF	(Northern Ireland) NIR	Natalie Johnson
4	DF	(England) ENG	Leandra Little (captain)
5	DF	(England) ENG	Naomi Hartley
6	MF	(England) ENG	Kasia Lipka
7	FW	(England) ENG	Jade Pennock
8	MF	(England) ENG	Maddy Cusack
9	FW	(England) ENG	Katie Wilkinson
10	MF	(England) ENG	Alethea Paul
11	DF	(England) ENG	Chloe Dixon
12	MF	(England) ENG	Rhema Lord-Mears

No.	Pos.	Nation	Player
13	GK	(England) ENG	Emily Batty
15	MF	(England) ENG	Tamara Wilcock
16	FW	(England) ENG	Lucy Watson
17	MF	(England) ENG	Katie Anderson
18	MF	(England) ENG	Sophie Walton
19	FW	(England) ENG	Charley Docherty
20	GK	(England) ENG	Fran Kitching
21	MF	(England) ENG	Bex Rayner
22	DF	(England) ENG	Ocean Rolandsen
23	FW	(England) ENG	Courtney Sweetman-Kirk
46	FW	(England) ENG	Melissa Johnson

== Preseason ==
12 August 2020 Friendly	Manchester City	6–0	Sheffield United	Manchester
	Kelly x2; White x2; Walsh; Little (o.g.)	Report		Stadium: Academy Stadium; Attendance: Behind-closed-doors

16 August 2020 Friendly	Tottenham Hotspur	2–0	Sheffield United	Enfield
	Dean 28' (pen.); Neville 51'	Report		Stadium: Hotspur Way; Attendance: Behind-closed-doors

== FA Women's Championship ==
=== Results summary ===
Overall								Home						Away					
Pld	W	D	L	GF	GA	GD	Pts	W	D	L	GF	GA	GD	W	D	L	GF	GA	GD
20	11	5	4	37	15	+22	38	4	4	2	16	7	+9	7	1	2	21	8	+13

Last updated: 2 May 2021.
Source: FA WSL

=== Results ===
6 September 2020 1	London City Lionesses	1–4	Sheffield United	Dartford
14:00	Priest (yellow card) 37'; Ayisi 49'	Report	Pennock (yellow card) 34', (goal) 36', 56'; Hartley (yellow card) 44'; Dixon (yellow card) 45'; Wilkinson 58', 64'	Stadium: Princes Park; Attendance: Behind-closed-doors; Referee: Sarah Garratt

13 September 2020 2	Sheffield United	2–2	Leicester City	Chesterfield
14:00	M. Johnson 30', 66'; Wilson (yellow card) 75'	Report	Farrow 2'; Flint (yellow card) 37', (goal) 90' (pen.)	Stadium: Technique Stadium; Attendance: Behind-closed-doors

27 September 2020 3	Sheffield United	4–0	London Bees	Chesterfield
14:00	M. Johnson 30', 66'; Wilkinson 57', 87'	Report	Robert (yellow card); Whinnett (yellow card)	Stadium: Technique Stadium; Attendance: Behind-closed-doors; Referee: Georgia Ball

11 October 2020 4	Coventry United	0–3	Sheffield United	Coventry
14:00		Report	M. Johnson (yellow card) 21', (goal) 25'; Wilkinson 78'; Sweetman-Kirk 79'	Stadium: Butts Park Arena; Attendance: Behind-closed-doors; Referee: Magdalena Golba

18 October 2020 5	Sheffield United	0–0	Lewes	Chesterfield
13:00		Report		Stadium: Technique Stadium; Attendance: Behind-closed-doors; Referee: Simon Simpson

1 November 2020 6	Sheffield United	3–0	Crystal Palace	Chesterfield
14:00	Pennock 48'; Sweetman-Kirk 52'; Wilkinson 77'	Report	Waldie (yellow card) 39'; Johnson (yellow card) 64'	Stadium: Technique Stadium; Attendance: Behind-closed-doors; Referee: Tom Reeves

8 November 2020 7	Liverpool	1–0	Sheffield United	Birkenhead
14:00	Babajide 5'; Laws (yellow card) 90'	Report		Stadium: Prenton Park; Attendance: Behind-closed-doors; Referee: Daniel Locker

15 November 2020 8	Sheffield United	0–1	Durham	Chesterfield
14:00	Dixon (yellow card) 53'	Report	Gears 54'; Christon (yellow card) 71'	Stadium: Technique Stadium; Attendance: Behind-closed-doors; Referee: Andy Sykes

22 November 2020 9	Charlton Athletic	0–1	Sheffield United	Crayford
14:00		Report	Little (yellow card) 20' (yellow-red card) 38'; Wilkinson 30' (pen.); Sarri (yellow card) 90'	Stadium: The Oakwood; Attendance: Behind-closed-doors; Referee: Simon Finnigan

13 December 2020 10	Sheffield United	3–3	Blackburn Rovers	Chesterfield
14:00	Wilkinson 26' (pen.), 43' (pen.); Sweetman-Kirk 82'	Report	Edwards 1'; Jordan 6'; Richards 37'	Stadium: Technique Stadium; Attendance: Behind-closed-doors; Referee: Lucy Oliver

20 December 2020 11	Sheffield United	0–0	London City Lionesses	Chesterfield
14:00		Report	Ejupi (yellow card) 90+2'	Stadium: Technique Stadium; Attendance: Behind-closed-doors; Referee: Robert Massey-Ellis

10 January 2021 12	Leicester City	2–1	Sheffield United	Quorn
14:00	Plumptre 22'; Flint 80'	Report	Cusack (yellow card) 21'; Wilkinson 76'; Dixon (yellow card) 88'	Stadium: Farley Way Stadium; Attendance: Behind-closed-doors

17 January 2021 13	Sheffield United	3–0	Coventry United	Chesterfield
14:00	Hartley 32'; Wilkinson 45', 90'	Report	Wilcox (yellow card) 76'	Stadium: Technique Stadium; Attendance: Behind-closed-doors; Referee: Amy Barber

24 January 2021 14	Lewes	0–2	Sheffield United	Lewes
13:00		Report	Wilkinson 27', 63'; Lord-Mears (yellow card) 42'; Little (yellow card) 79'	Stadium: The Dripping Pan; Attendance: Behind-closed-doors; Referee: Robert Whitton

7 February 2021 15	London Bees	2–4	Sheffield United	Canons Park
14:00	McLean 40'; Estcourt 54'; Robert (yellow card) 55' (yellow-red card) 90'; Cruickshank (yellow card) 73'	Report	Brooks 14' (o.g.); Rolandsen (yellow card) 20'; Sweetman-Kirk 34'; Hartley 47'; N. Johnson (yellow card) 67'; Wilkinson 90'	Stadium: The Hive Stadium; Attendance: Behind-closed-doors; Referee: Simon Finnigan

14 March 2021 16	Sheffield United	1–0	Charlton Athletic	Chesterfield
14:00	Wilkinson 52'	Report		Stadium: Technique Stadium; Attendance: Behind-closed-doors; Referee: Lucy Oliver

28 March 2021 17	Durham	1–1	Sheffield United	Durham
12:00	Johnson 32'	Report	Sweetman-Kirk 29'; Little (yellow card) 77'	Stadium: Maiden Castle; Attendance: Behind-closed-doors; Referee: Amy Fearn

4 April 2021 18	Crystal Palace	0–3	Sheffield United	Bromley
14:00		Report	Wilkinson 17', 59'; Rayner 30'	Stadium: Hayes Lane; Attendance: Behind-closed-doors; Referee: Amy Barber

25 April 2021 19	Sheffield United	0–1	Liverpool	Chesterfield
14:00		Report	Thestrup 30'; Hinds (yellow card) 84' (yellow-red card) 90+1'; Foster (yellow card) 89'	Stadium: Technique Stadium; Attendance: Behind-closed-doors; Referee: Magdalena Golba

2 May 2021 20	Blackburn Rovers	1–2	Sheffield United	Bamber Bridge
14:00	Hodgson 55'	Report	Wilkinson 11'; Rolandsen (yellow card) 75'; Pennock 90'	Stadium: Sir Tom Finney Stadium; Attendance: Behind-closed-doors; Referee: Karl Buckley

=== League table ===
Pos	Team	Pld	W	D	L	GF	GA	GD	Pts
2	Durham	20	12	6	2	34	15	+19	42
3	Liverpool	20	11	6	3	37	15	+22	39
4	Sheffield United	20	11	5	4	37	15	+22	38
5	Lewes	20	8	4	8	19	22	−3	28
6	London City Lionesses	20	6	6	8	19	19	0	24

Rules for classification: 1) Points; 2) Goal difference; 3) Number of goals scored

== Women's FA Cup ==
As a member of the top two tiers, Sheffield United will enter the FA Cup in the fourth round proper. Originally scheduled to take place on 31 January 2021, it was delayed due to COVID-19 restrictions.

18 April 2021 Fourth round	Middlesbrough	0–9	Sheffield United	Billingham
14:00		Report	Lord-Mears 30', 34', 68'; Rayner 40'; Sweetman-Kirk 45+2', 53', 57'; Cusack 63'; Watson 86'	Stadium: Bedford Terrace; Attendance: Behind-closed-doors

16 May 2021 Fifth round	Tottenham Hotspur	2–1 (a.e.t.)	Sheffield United	Canons Park
14:00	Quinn 30'; Graham 109'	Report	Watson 80'	Stadium: The Hive; Attendance: Behind-closed-doors; Referee: Abigail Byrne

== FA Women's League Cup ==
7 October 2020 Group stage	Aston Villa	1–0	Sheffield United	Walsall
19:30	Hutton 38' (pen.)	Report		Stadium: Bescot Stadium; Attendance: Behind-closed-doors; Referee: Elizabeth Simms

3 November 2020 Group stage	Sheffield United	0–6	Durham	Chesterfield
19:45		Report	Hill 45+1' (pen.); Gears 58'; Roberts 60'; Robson (yellow card) 62', (goal) 67'; Galloway 75'; Sharpe 80'	Stadium: Technique Stadium; Attendance: Behind-closed-doors; Referee: Christina Hattersley

19 November 2020 Group stage	Coventry United	0–4	Sheffield United	Coventry
19:45		Report	Little 9'; Wilkinson 33'; Pennock 66'; Johnson 77'; Dixon (yellow card) 86'	Stadium: Butts Park Arena; Attendance: Behind-closed-doors; Referee: Callum Parke

Pos	Team	Pld	W	WPEN	LPEN	L	GF	GA	GD	Pts	Qualification	AST	DUR	SHU	COV
1	Aston Villa	3	2	1	0	0	11	1	+10	8	Advanced to knock-out stage	—	—	1–0	—
2	Durham	3	2	0	1	0	12	3	+9	7	Possible knock-out stage based on ranking	1–1	—	—	5–2
3	Sheffield United	3	1	0	0	2	4	7	−3	3		—	0–6	—	—
4	Coventry United	3	0	0	0	3	2	18	−16	0		0–9	—	0–4	—

Source: thefa.com
Rules for classification: 1) Points; 2) Goal difference; 3) Number of goals scored; 4) Number of wins; 5) Head-to-head record

== Squad statistics ==
=== Appearances ===
As of 16 May 2021

Starting appearances are listed first, followed by substitute appearances after the + symbol where applicable.

No.	Pos	Nat	Player	Total		League		FA Cup		League Cup	
No.	Pos	Nat	Player	Apps	Goals	Apps	Goals	Apps	Goals	Apps	Goals
2	DF	(England) ENG	Ellie Wilson	6	0	4+1	0	0	0	1	0
3	DF	(Northern Ireland) NIR	Natalie Johnson	16	0	11+2	0	2	0	1	0
4	DF	(England) ENG	Leandra Little	23	1	18	0	2	0	3	1
5	DF	(England) ENG	Naomi Hartley	25	2	20	2	2	0	3	0
6	MF	(England) ENG	Kasia Lipka	25	0	20	0	2	0	3	0
7	FW	(England) ENG	Jade Pennock	20	5	11+7	4	0	0	2	1
8	MF	(England) ENG	Maddy Cusack	23	1	18	0	2	1	3	0
9	FW	(England) ENG	Katie Wilkinson	25	20	19+1	19	2	0	2+1	1
10	MF	(England) ENG	Alethea Paul	5	0	1+2	0	0	0	0+2	0
11	DF	(England) ENG	Chloe Dixon	13	0	9+2	0	0+1	0	1	0
12	MF	(England) ENG	Rhema Lord-Mears	24	3	14+5	0	2	3	2+1	0
13	GK	(England) ENG	Emily Batty	1	0	0	0	0+1	0	0	0
15	MF	(England) ENG	Tamara Wilcock	1	0	0+1	0	0	0	0	0
16	FW	(England) ENG	Lucy Watson	15	2	3+8	0	0+2	2	2	0
17	MF	(England) ENG	Katie Anderson	0	0	0	0	0	0	0	0
18	MF	(England) ENG	Sophie Walton	14	0	4+5	0	0+2	0	1+2	0
19	FW	(England) ENG	Charley Docherty	1	0	0+1	0	0	0	0	0
20	GK	(England) ENG	Fran Kitching	24	0	20	0	2	0	2	0
21	MF	(England) ENG	Bex Rayner	11	2	8+1	1	2	1	0	0
22	DF	(England) ENG	Ocean Rolandsen	10	0	8	0	2	0	0	0
23	FW	(England) ENG	Courtney Sweetman-Kirk	22	8	11+6	5	2	3	1+2	0
46	FW	(England) ENG	Melissa Johnson	19	6	9+6	5	0+1	0	1+2	1
Players who appeared for the club but left during the season:
1	GK	(Northern Ireland) NIR	Becky Flaherty	1	0	0	0	0	0	1	0
14	FW	(England) ENG	Keri Matthews	12	0	1+7	0	0+2	0	1+1	0
15	DF	(England) ENG	Hannah Coan	2	0	0+2	0	0	0	0	0
17	FW	(Greece) GRE	Veatriki Sarri	13	0	9+1	0	0	0	2+1	0
24	DF	(England) ENG	Ali Johnson	2	0	1+1	0	0	0	0	0
25	MF	(New Zealand) NZL	Olivia Chance	3	0	1+1	0	0	0	1	0

== Transfers ==
=== Transfers in ===
Date	Position	Nationality	Name	From	Ref.
28 July 2020	FW	(England)	Melissa Johnson	(England) Aston Villa	
7 August 2020	DF	(England)	Ellie Wilson	(England) London Bees	
8 August 2020	MF	(England)	Sophie Walton	(England) Nottingham Forest	
8 August 2020	DF	(Northern Ireland)	Natalie Johnson	(England) Leicester City	
22 August 2020	GK	(England)	Fran Kitching	(England) Liverpool	
26 September 2020	MF	(New Zealand)	Olivia Chance	(England) Bristol City	
2 October 2020	FW	(England)	Courtney Sweetman-Kirk	(England) Liverpool	
8 January 2021	MF	(England)	Bex Rayner	(England) Nottingham Forest	
16 January 2021	DF	(England)	Ocean Rolandsen	(England) Watford	
6 February 2021	MF	(England)	Katie Anderson	(England) Derby County	

=== Loans in ===
Date	Position	Nationality	Name	From	Until	Ref.
12 September 2020	DF	(England)	Hannah Coan	(England) Everton	4 November 2020	

=== Transfers out ===
Date	Position	Nationality	Name	To	Ref.
12 June 2020	DF	(England)	Sophie Barker	(England) Leicester City	
26 June 2020	FW	(England)	Izzy Ford	(United States) South Alabama Jaguars	
27 July 2020	MF	(England)	Sam Tierney	(England) Leicester City	
27 July 2020	FW	(England)	Olivia Fergusson	(England) Leicester City	
4 November 2020	DF	(England)	Ali Johnson	(England) Blackburn Rovers	
23 November 2020	MF	(New Zealand)	Olivia Chance	(Australia) Brisbane Roar	
7 January 2021	MF	(Greece)	Veatriki Sarri	(England) Birmingham City	
17 March 2021	FW	(England)	Keri Matthews	(United States) Arizona State Sun Devils	
23 April 2021	GK	(Northern Ireland)	Becky Flaherty	(England) Blackburn Rovers	
