= 2021–22 FA Women's League Cup =

Tournament details
- Country: England
- Dates: 13 October 2021 – 6 March 2022
- Teams: 24

Final positions
- Champions: Manchester City (4th title)
- Runners-up: Chelsea

Tournament statistics
- Matches played: 45
- Goals scored: 139 (3.09 per match)
- Attendance: 28,584 (635 per match)
- Top goal scorer(s): (England) Angela Addison Tottenham Hotspur (Denmark) Pernille Harder Chelsea (England) Lauren Hemp Manchester City (Jamaica) Khadija Shaw Manchester City (Scotland) Caroline Weir Manchester City (4 each)

The 2021–22 FA Women's League Cup was the eleventh edition of the FA Women's Super League and FA Women's Championship's league cup competition. It was sponsored by Continental AG, who sponsored the competition since its creation, and was officially known as the FA Women's Continental League Cup for sponsorship reasons. All 24 teams from the FA WSL and Championship took part in the competition.

Chelsea were the defending champions. They lost 3–1 in the final against Manchester City, who won their fourth title.

== Format changes ==
The competition featured a group stage split regionally. However, the number of groups was reduced from six to five: two in the North and three in the South. In a change from previous years, teams competing in the UEFA Women's Champions League group stage were exempt from the League Cup group stage, earning a provisional bye to the quarter-finals. As a result, the initial group stage draw featured 22 of the 24 teams: one Northern group had five teams drawn into it with the remaining Northern group and all three Southern groups initially featuring four teams each. The three teams excluded from the draw were Chelsea, who automatically entered the Champions League group stage and therefore joined the League Cup at the quarter-final stage, and Manchester City and Arsenal who went through the Champions League qualifying rounds. Should either team be eliminated during qualification, they would enter the League Cup group stage and be drawn into an existing group of four in their geographical region.

The first place team in each of the five groups qualified for the quarter-finals, and were joined by the two UEFA Women's Champions League teams, Chelsea and Arsenal. Because Manchester City entered the group stage of the League Cup following their elimination from the second qualifying round of the Champions League, the best-placed runner-up also progressed with the five group winners.

== Group stage ==
=== Group A ===
Pos	Team	Pld	W	WPEN	LPEN	L	GF	GA	GD	Pts	Qualification	LIV	SUN	BLB	SHU	AST
1	Liverpool	4	1	2	1	0	3	2	+1	8	Advances to knock-out stage	—	—	2–1	—	1–1
2	Sunderland	4	1	2	0	1	3	9	−6	7	Possible knock-out stage based on ranking	0–0	—	—	—	—
3	Blackburn Rovers	4	2	0	0	2	4	4	0	6		—	1–2	—	1–0	—
4	Sheffield United	4	1	0	2	1	3	3	0	5		0–0	1–1	—	—	0–7
5	Aston Villa	4	1	0	1	2	9	4	+5	4		—	—	0–1	1–2	—

Source: thefa.com
Rules for classification: 1) Points; 2) Goal difference; 3) Number of goals scored; 4) Number of wins; 5) Head-to-head record
13 October 2021
19:00

Liverpool	1–1	Aston Villa
Kiernan 66'	Report	Hayles 2'
Penalties
Bailey (penalty scored); Holland (penalty scored); Daniëls (penalty scored); Robe (penalty scored); Hodson (penalty scored)	5–4	(penalty missed) Boye-Hlorkah; (penalty scored) Allen; (penalty scored) Mayling; (penalty scored) Hutton; (penalty scored) Petzelberger

Prenton Park, Birkenhead
Attendance: 601
14 October 2021
19:30

Sheffield United	1–1	Sunderland
Sweetman-Kirk 53'	Report	Ramshaw 90+5'
Penalties
Rayner (penalty scored); Watson (penalty missed); Newsham (penalty scored); Lipka (penalty missed)	2–4	(penalty scored) Ramshaw; (penalty scored) Kelly; (penalty scored) Scarr; (penalty scored) Herron

Technique Stadium, Chesterfield
Attendance: 190

3 November 2021
19:30

Sheffield United	0–0	Liverpool
	Report
Penalties
Sweetman-Kirk (penalty scored); Paul (penalty scored); Rayner (penalty missed); Cusack (penalty scored)	3–5	(penalty scored) Moore; (penalty scored) Holland; (penalty scored) Robe; (penalty scored) Kearns; (penalty scored) Hinds

Technique Stadium, Chesterfield
4 November 2021
19:45

Blackburn Rovers	1–2	Sunderland
Crompton 78'	Report	McCatty 37'; Manders 45'

Sir Tom Finney Stadium, Bamber Bridge
Attendance: 186

17 November 2021
19:00

Liverpool	2–1	Blackburn Rovers
Bailey 29'; Hinds 50'	Report	Hodgson 85'

Prenton Park, Birkenhead
Attendance: 549
17 November 2021
19:30

Aston Villa	1–2	Sheffield United
Boye-Hlorkah 48'	Report	Lipka 11'; Sweetman-Kirk 20'

Bescot Stadium, Walsall
Attendance: 352

5 December 2021
12:00

Blackburn Rovers	1–0	Sheffield United
Leek 45+2'	Report

Sir Tom Finney Stadium, Bamber Bridge
Attendance: 207
5 December 2021
12:00

Sunderland	0–7	Aston Villa
	Report	Blindkilde 1'; Petzelberger 10'; Allen 41', 90'; Lehmann 72', 76'; Boye-Hlorkah 84'

Eppleton CW, Hetton-le-Hole
Attendance: 197

15 December 2021
19:30

Sunderland	0–0	Liverpool
	Report
Penalties
Ramshaw (penalty missed); Kelly (penalty scored); Beer (penalty scored); Herron (penalty scored); Farrugia (penalty scored)	4–2	(penalty missed) Fahey; (penalty scored) Kearns; (penalty missed) Furness; (penalty scored) Holland

Eppleton CW, Hetton-le-Hole
Attendance: 191
15 December 2021
19:45

Aston Villa	0–1	Blackburn Rovers
	Report	Leek 69'

Bescot Stadium, Walsall
Attendance: 323

=== Group B ===
Pos	Team	Pld	W	WPEN	LPEN	L	GF	GA	GD	Pts	Qualification	MCI	MNU	EVE	LEI	DUR
1	Manchester City	4	3	0	0	1	14	3	+11	9	Advances to knock-out stage	—	—	5–1	—	3–0
2	Manchester United	4	2	1	1	0	8	5	+3	9	Possible knock-out stage based on ranking	2–1	—	—	2–2	—
3	Everton	4	2	0	0	2	5	8	−3	6		—	0–2	—	—	1–0
4	Leicester City	4	1	1	0	2	5	11	−6	5		0–5	—	1–3	—	—
5	Durham	4	0	0	1	3	3	8	−5	1		—	2–2	—	1–2	—

Source: thefa.com
Rules for classification: 1) Points; 2) Goal difference; 3) Number of goals scored; 4) Number of wins; 5) Head-to-head record
13 October 2021
19:00

Manchester City	5–1	Everton
Weir 8'; Shaw 32'; Hemp 74'; Park 79'; White 89'	Report	Clinton 10'

Academy Stadium, Manchester
Attendance: 752
14 October 2021
19:00

Durham	2–2	Manchester United
Bradley 50'; Hepple 85'	report report	Fuso 35'; Toone 73'
Penalties
Robson (penalty scored); Hepple (penalty scored); Hill (penalty scored); Salicki (penalty missed)	3–5	(penalty scored) Toone; (penalty scored) Mannion; (penalty scored) Ladd; (penalty scored) Bøe Risa; (penalty scored) Russo

Maiden Castle, Durham
Attendance: 1,468

3 November 2021
19:00

Leicester City	1–3	Everton
Plumptre 82'	Report	Anvegård 2'; Christiansen 39'; Gauvin 87'

Pirelli Stadium, Burton upon Trent
4 November 2021
19:00

Manchester City	3–0	Durham
Angeldal 16'; Weir 87'; Beckie 90'	Report

Academy Stadium, Manchester
Attendance: 757

17 November 2021
19:00

Durham	1–2	Leicester City
Crosthwaite 79'	Report Report	O'Brien 51'; Pike 56'

Maiden Castle, Durham
Attendance: 402
17 November 2021
19:00

Manchester United	2–1	Manchester City
Fuso 30'; Batlle 82'	Report	Losada 2'

Leigh Sports Village, Leigh
Attendance: 2,369

5 December 2021
12:00

Manchester United	2–2	Leicester City
Russo 49'; Zelem 81'	Report	Howard 32'; Flint 79'
Penalties
Toone (penalty scored); Mannion (penalty scored); Russo (penalty scored); Zelem (penalty missed); Bøe Risa (penalty missed)	3–4	(penalty scored) Sigsworth; (penalty scored) Flint; (penalty scored) McManus; (penalty missed) Purfield; (penalty scored) Brougham

Leigh Sports Village, Leigh
Attendance: 839
5 December 2021
13:00

Everton	1–0	Durham
Duggan 61'	Report

Walton Hall Park, Walton Hall Park
Attendance: 380

15 December 2021
19:00

Everton	0–2	Manchester United
	Report	D. Turner 20' (o.g.); Thomas 23'

Walton Hall Park, Walton Hall Park
Attendance: 672
12 January 2022
19:00

Leicester City	0–5	Manchester City
	Report 1 Report 2	White 9'; Hemp 15', 34'; Stanway 16', 47'

Pirelli Stadium, Burton upon Trent
Attendance: 523

=== Group C ===
Pos	Team	Pld	W	WPEN	LPEN	L	GF	GA	GD	Pts	Qualification	TOT	CHA	COV	WAT
1	Tottenham Hotspur	3	3	0	0	0	15	2	+13	9	Advances to knock-out stage	—	1–0	—	—
2	Charlton Athletic	3	2	0	0	1	8	2	+6	6	Possible knock-out stage based on ranking	—	—	3–1	—
3	Coventry United	3	1	0	0	2	6	6	0	3		2–3	—	—	3–0
4	Watford	3	0	0	0	3	0	19	−19	0		0–11	0–5	—	—

Source: thefa.com
Rules for classification: 1) Points; 2) Goal difference; 3) Number of goals scored; 4) Number of wins; 5) Head-to-head record
13 October 2021
19:30

Tottenham Hotspur	1–0	Charlton Athletic
Tang 51'	Report 1 Report 2

The Hive, Canons Park
Attendance: 404
13 October 2021
19:45

Coventry United	3–0	Watford
Estcourt 52'; Wilkinson 56'; Fergusson 60'	Report

Butts Park Arena, Coventry
Attendance: 250

17 November 2021
19:30

Charlton Athletic	3–1	Coventry United
Roche 12'; Hughes 26', 40'	Report	Fergusson 16'

The Oakwood, Crayford
Attendance: 116
17 November 2021
19:30

Watford	0–11	Tottenham Hotspur
	Report	Ale 38'; Morgan 42'; Addison 45', 45+2', 78'; Ayane 47', 60', 71'; Ubogagu 54'; Cho 85'; Lane 89'

Gaywood Park, Kings Langley
Attendance: 230

15 December 2021
19:30

Watford	0–5	Charlton Athletic
	Report	Vyse 27' (o.g.); Rutherford 32', 54'; Ross 41'; Sulola 67'

Gaywood Park, Kings Langley
Attendance: 92<
15 December 2021
19:45

Coventry United	2–3	Tottenham Hotspur
Toussaint 49'; Hardy 77'	Report	Morgan 10'; Addison 30'; Williams 89'

Butts Park Arena, Coventry
Attendance: 312

=== Group D ===
Pos	Team	Pld	W	WPEN	LPEN	L	GF	GA	GD	Pts	Qualification	BRI	REA	CRY	LEW
1	Bristol City	3	2	1	0	0	4	1	+3	8	Advances to knock-out stage	—	—	—	3–1
2	Reading	3	1	0	1	1	4	3	+1	4	Possible knock-out stage based on ranking	0–1	—	—	—
3	Crystal Palace	3	0	1	1	1	2	4	−2	3		0–0	1–3	—	—
4	Lewes	3	0	1	1	1	3	5	−2	3		—	1—1	1–1	—

Source: thefa.com
Rules for classification: 1) Points; 2) Goal difference; 3) Number of goals scored; 4) Number of wins; 5) Head-to-head record
13 October 2021
19:30

Lewes	1–1	Crystal Palace
Umotong 20' (pen.)	Report	Sharpe 89' (pen.)
Penalties
Cleverley (penalty scored); Dalton (penalty missed); Balfour (penalty scored); Noble (penalty missed); Timms (penalty scored); Ashworth-Clifford (penalty missed)	3–4	(penalty missed) Haines; (penalty scored) Sharpe; (penalty scored) Everett; (penalty scored) McLean; (penalty missed) Barton; (penalty scored) Pearse

The Dripping Pan, Lewes
Attendance: 228
13 October 2021
19:30

Reading	0–1	Bristol City
	Report	Harrison 90+2'

Madejski Stadium, Reading
Attendance: 190

17 November 2021
19:30

Bristol City	3–1	Lewes
Beever-Jones 36'; Harrison 43'; Johnson 46'	Report	Logan 54'

Robins High Performance Centre, Failand
Attendance: 313
17 November 2021
19:30

Crystal Palace	1–3	Reading
Sharpe 51'	Report	Evans 34'; Chaplen 73', 76'

Hayes Lane, Bromley

15 December 2021
19:30

Lewes	1–1	Reading
Cleverly 10'	Report	Dowie 17'
Penalties
Dalton (penalty scored); Logan (penalty missed); Timms (penalty scored); Miller (penalty scored); Noble (penalty scored); Ashworth-Clifford (penalty scored); Cousins (penalty missed); Hack (penalty scored)	6–5	(penalty missed) Peplow; (penalty scored) Dowie; (penalty scored) Harries; (penalty scored) Vanhaevermaet; (penalty scored) Woodham; (penalty scored) Eikeland; (penalty missed) Primmer; (penalty missed) Lister

The Dripping Pan, Lewes
Attendance: 412
15 December 2021
20:00

Crystal Palace	0–0	Bristol City
	Report
Penalties
Farrow (penalty scored); Baptiste (penalty scored); Sharpe (penalty scored); Clifford (penalty scored); Pearse (penalty missed)	4–5	(penalty scored) Jhamat; (penalty scored) Kuyken; (penalty scored) Bull; (penalty scored) Morgan; (penalty scored) Johnson

Hayes Lane, Bromley
Attendance: 70<

=== Group E ===
Pos	Team	Pld	W	WPEN	LPEN	L	GF	GA	GD	Pts	Qualification	WHU	LCL	BHA	BIR
1	West Ham United	3	3	0	0	0	8	0	+8	9	Advances to knock-out stage	—	—	3–0	—
2	London City Lionesses	3	1	1	0	1	3	3	0	5	Possible knock-out stage based on ranking	0–1	—	—	2–2
3	Brighton & Hove Albion	3	1	0	0	2	1	4	−3	3		—	0–1	—	—
4	Birmingham City	3	0	0	1	2	2	7	−5	1		0–4	—	0–1	—

Source: thefa.com
Rules for classification: 1) Points; 2) Goal difference; 3) Number of goals scored; 4) Number of wins; 5) Head-to-head record
13 October 2021
19:00

London City Lionesses	0–1	West Ham United
	Report	Parker 15'

Princes Park, Dartford
Attendance: 189
13 October 2021
19:30

Birmingham City	0–1	Brighton & Hove Albion
	Report	Connolly 45'

St Andrew's, Birmingham
Attendance: 304

17 November 2021
19:00

Brighton & Hove Albion	0–1	London City Lionesses
	Report	Muya 51'

Broadfield Stadium, Crawley
Attendance: 428
17 November 2021
19:30

Birmingham City	0–4	West Ham United
	Report	Lo. Quinn 38' (o.g.); Walker 41'; Parker 74'; Svitková 78'

St Andrew's, Birmingham
Attendance: 181

15 December 2021
19:00

London City Lionesses	2–2	Birmingham City
Muya 39'; Rodgers 59'	Report	Ryan-Doyle 80', 88'
Penalties
Rouse (penalty scored); Bennett (penalty missed); Thompson (penalty scored); Rossiter (penalty scored); Yanez (penalty scored); Napier (penalty scored)	5–4	(penalty scored) Ryan-Doyle; (penalty missed) Finn; (penalty scored) Whipp; (penalty scored) Lo. Quinn; (penalty scored) Ewens; (penalty missed) Lawley

Princes Park, Dartford
Attendance: 78
15 December 2021
19:30

West Ham United	3–0	Brighton & Hove Albion
Longhurst 26'; Filis 40'; Svitková 90+4'	Report

Victoria Road, Dagenham
Attendance: 475

=== Ranking of second-placed teams ===
Due to Manchester City's failure to progress from Champions League qualifying, they entered the League Cup group stage. With only two teams now receiving byes to the League Cup quarter-finals, the best-placed runner-up will also progress with the five group winners to make up the final eight. With the three Southern groups containing one fewer team than the two Northern groups, the ranking to determine which second-placed team progresses is calculated on a points-per-game basis.

Pos	Grp	Team	Pld	W	WPEN	LPEN	L	GF	GA	GD	Pts	PPG	Qualification
1	B	Manchester United	4	2	1	1	0	8	5	+3	9	2.25	Advances to knock-out stage
2	C	Charlton Athletic	3	2	0	0	1	8	2	+6	6	2.00	
3	A	Sunderland	4	1	2	0	1	3	9	−6	7	1.75	
4	E	London City Lionesses	3	1	1	0	1	3	3	0	5	1.67	
5	D	Reading	3	1	0	1	1	4	3	+1	4	1.33	

Source: thefa.com

== Knock-out stage ==
Quarter-finals
West Ham United	2
Chelsea	4
Arsenal	0
Manchester United	1
Manchester City	3
Bristol City	1
Tottenham Hotspur	1
Liverpool	0

Semi-finals
Chelsea	3
Manchester United	1
Manchester City	3
Tottenham Hotspur	0

Final
Chelsea	1
Manchester City	3

=== Quarter-finals ===
Chelsea entered the League Cup at the quarter-final stage having been exempt from the League Cup group stage due to their automatic participation in the Champions League group stage. Arsenal also entered at this stage having progressed from the Champions League qualifying rounds. The ties were played on 19 January 2022.

19 January 2022
19:30

West Ham United	2–4	Chelsea
Svitková 34'; Houssein 83'	Report	Harder 25', 61', 66'; Cuthbert 58'

Victoria Road, Dagenham
Attendance: 615
Referee: Paul Howard

19 January 2022
19:30

Tottenham Hotspur	1–0	Liverpool
R. Williams 71'	Report 1 Report 2

The Hive, Canons Park
Attendance: 378
Referee: Robert Massey-Ellis

19 January 2022
19:00

Manchester City	3–1	Bristol City
Shaw 27', 44'; Losada 62'	Report 1 Report 2	Greenwood 16' (o.g.)

Academy Stadium, Manchester
Attendance: 574
Referee: Simon Mather

19 January 2022
19:15

Arsenal	0–1	Manchester United
	Report	Russo 85'

Meadow Park, Borehamwood
Attendance: 825
Referee: Tom Reeves

=== Semi-finals ===
The semi-finals were played on 2 and 3 February 2022.

2 February 2022
19:00

Chelsea	3–1	Manchester United
Harder 26'; Fleming 31'; Carter 39'	Report	Bøe Risa 32'

Kingsmeadow, Kingston upon Thames
Attendance: 1,548
Referee: Paul Howard

3 February 2022
19:00

Manchester City	3–0	Tottenham Hotspur
Park 21'; Shaw 27'; Hemp 70'	Report

Academy Stadium, Manchester
Attendance: 1,410
Referee: Simon Mather

=== Final ===
On 20 December 2021, it was announced the 2022 FA Women's League Cup Final would be held at Plough Lane, the home of AFC Wimbledon, for the first time. The final was scheduled to take place on 5 March 2022.

5 March 2022
17:15 GMT

Chelsea	1–3	Manchester City
Kerr 34'	Report	Weir 49', 69'; White 58'

Plough Lane, Wimbledon, London
Attendance: 8,004
Referee: Lisa Benn

== See also ==
- 2021–22 FA WSL
- 2021–22 FA Women's Championship
