= 2018–19 Chelsea F.C. Women season =

Chelsea
2018–19 season
- Chairman: Adrian Jacob
- Manager: Emma Hayes
- Stadium: Kingsmeadow
- FA WSL: 3rd
- FA Cup: Semi-finals
- League Cup: Semi-finals
- Champions League: Semi-finals
Home colours	Away colours

The 2018–19 season was Chelsea Women's 27th competitive season and 9th consecutive season in the top flight of English football. It was the first season after the naming switch from Chelsea Ladies and also the first season in the rebranded FA Women's Super League. The season covers the period from 1 July 2018 to 30 June 2019.

== Squad information ==
=== First team squad ===
As of 4 January 2019.

No.	Name	Nat	Since	Date of birth (age)	Signed from
Goalkeepers
1	Hedvig Lindahl	(Sweden)	2014	29 April 1983 (age 42)	(Sweden) Kristianstads DFF
12	Lizzie Durack	(England)	2018	20 May 1994 (age 31)	(England) Everton
28	Carly Telford	(England)	2017	7 July 1987 (age 38)	(England) Notts County
30	Ann-Katrin Berger	(Germany)	2019	9 October 1990 (age 35)	(England) Birmingham City
Defenders
2	Maria Thorisdottir	(Norway)	2017	5 June 1993 (age 32)	(Norway) Klepp
3	Hannah Blundell	(England)	2013	25 May 1994 (age 31)	Homegrown
4	Millie Bright (vice-captain)	(England)	2014	21 August 1993 (age 32)	(England) Doncaster Rovers Belles
6	Anita Asante	(England)	2018	27 April 1985 (age 40)	(Sweden) FC Rosengård
11	Ali Riley	(New Zealand)	2018	30 October 1987 (age 38)	(Sweden) FC Rosengård
16	Magdalena Eriksson	(Sweden)	2017	6 September 1993 (age 32)	(Sweden) Linköpings
20	Jonna Andersson	(Sweden)	2017	2 January 1993 (age 33)	(Sweden) Linköpings
21	Deanna Cooper	(England)	2017	19 June 1993 (age 32)	(England) London Bees
25	Jade Bailey	(England)	2016	11 November 1995 (age 30)	(England) Arsenal
Midfielders
5	Sophie Ingle	(Wales)	2018	2 September 1991 (age 34)	(England) Liverpool
7	Jessica Carter	(England)	2018	27 October 1997 (age 28)	(England) Birmingham City
8	Karen Carney (captain)	(England)	2016	1 August 1987 (age 38)	(England) Birmingham City
10	Ji So-yun	(South Korea)	2014	21 February 1991 (age 34)	(Japan) INAC Kobe Leonessa
18	Maren Mjelde	(Norway)	2017	6 November 1989 (age 36)	(Norway) Avaldsnes IL
24	Drew Spence	(England)	2008	23 October 1992 (age 33)	Homegrown
Forwards
14	Fran Kirby	(England)	2015	29 June 1993 (age 32)	(England) Reading
15	Beth England	(England)	2016	3 June 1994 (age 31)	(England) Doncaster Rovers Belles
17	Adelina Engman	(Finland)	2018	11 October 1994 (age 31)	(Sweden) Kopparbergs/Göteborg FC
22	Erin Cuthbert	(Scotland)	2016	19 July 1998 (age 27)	(Scotland) Glasgow City
23	Ramona Bachmann	(Switzerland)	2017	25 October 1990 (age 35)	(Germany) Wolfsburg

== New contracts ==
No.	Pos	Player	Contract end	Date	Source
10	MF	(South Korea) Ji So-yun	2020	21 May 2018	
18	MF	(Norway) Maren Mjelde	2021	29 May 2018	
14	FW	(England) Fran Kirby	2021	1 June 2018	
16	DF	(Sweden) Magdalena Eriksson	2021	21 August 2018	
4	DF	(England) Millie Bright	2021	22 August 2018	

== Transfers ==
=== In ===
No.	Pos	Player	Transferred From	Fee	Date	Source
	GK	(England) Lizzie Durack	(England) Everton	Undisclosed	8 June 2018	
	MF	(Wales) Sophie Ingle	(England) Liverpool	Undisclosed	14 June 2018	
	MF	(England) Jessica Carter	(England) Birmingham City	Undisclosed	19 June 2018	
	DF	(New Zealand) Ali Riley	(Sweden) FC Rosengård	Undisclosed	26 June 2018	
	FW	(Finland) Adelina Engman	(Sweden) Kopparbergs/Göteborg FC	Undisclosed	29 June 2018	
	GK	(Germany) Ann-Katrin Berger	(England) Birmingham City	Undisclosed	4 January 2019	

=== Out ===
No.	Pos	Player	Transferred To	Fee	Date	Source
	MF	(England) Katie Chapman	Retired		10 May 2018	
	FW	(England) Eniola Aluko	(Italy) Juventus	Free	16 May 2018	
	DF	(England) Claire Rafferty	(England) West Ham United	Free	17 May 2018	
	GK	(England) Becky Spencer	(England) West Ham United	Free	21 May 2018	
	GK	(England) Fran Kitching	(England) Sheffield United	Free	22 May 2018	
	FW	(England) Gemma Davison	(England) Reading	Free	13 June 2018	
	DF	(England) Gilly Flaherty	(England) West Ham United	Undisclosed	25 June 2018	

== Coaching staff ==
Position	Staff
Manager	(England) Emma Hayes
Assistant manager	(England) Paul Green
Coach	(England) TJ O'Leary
Head of Player Development	(England) Robert Udberg

Source: Chelsea F.C.

== Non-competitive ==
=== Pre-season ===
2 August 2018 Friendly	Montpellier (France)	3–2	(England) Chelsea	Montpellier
18:00 EST	Cayman 11'; Le Bihan 45', 63'	Report	Cuthbert 37'; Ji 70'	Stadium: Domaine de Grammont

5 August 2018 Friendly	FC Barcelona (Spain)	1–1	(England) Chelsea	Barcelona
19:00 EST	Bárbara 78'	Report	Carney 90+1'	Stadium: Mini Estadi

8 August 2018 Friendly	(England) Chelsea	3–0	(Italy) Juventus	Kingston upon Thames
19:00 BST	Bachmann 42'; Mjelde 86'; Kirby 90'	Report		Stadium: Kingsmeadow

== Competitions ==
=== Women's Super League ===
==== Matches ====
Sun 9 Sept 2018 1	Chelsea	0–0	Manchester City	Kingston upon Thames
14:00 BST	Eriksson (yellow card) 53'	Report	Beattie (yellow card) 3'; Bonner (yellow card) 67'	Stadium: Kingsmeadow; Attendance: 2,501; Referee: Rebecca Welch

Wed 19 Sept 2018 2	Bristol City	0–0	Chelsea	Bristol
19:00 BST		Report		Stadium: Stoke Gifford Stadium; Attendance: 459; Referee: Stacey Pearson

Sun 23 Sept 2018 3	Everton	0–0	Chelsea	Southport
14:00 BST		Report	Eriksson (yellow card) 64'; Mjelde (yellow card) 74'	Stadium: Merseyrail Community Stadium; Attendance: 213; Referee: Helen Conley

Sun 30 Sept 2018 4	Chelsea	2–0	Brighton & Hove Albion	Kingston upon Thames
14:00 BST	Kirby 32'; Cuthbert 36'; Thorisdottir (yellow card) 67'	Report		Stadium: Kingsmeadow; Attendance: 1,175; Referee: Abby Marriott

Sun 14 Oct 2018 5	Chelsea	0–5	Arsenal	Kingston upon Thames
14:00 BST	Spence (yellow card) 63'	Report	K. Little 21' (pen.); Miedema 38', 57'; Nobbs 52', 67'	Stadium: Kingsmeadow; Attendance: 2,020; Referee: Sam Purkiss

Sun 21 Oct 2018 6	Birmingham City	0–0	Chelsea	Solihull
12:30 BST	Scott (yellow card) 62'; Ladd (yellow card) 12' (red card) 85'	Report	Bright (yellow card) 48'	Stadium: Automated Technology Group Stadium; Attendance: 1,177; Referee: Amy Fearn

Sun 28 Oct 2018 7	Chelsea	1–0	Liverpool	Kingston upon Thames
14:00 GMT	Eriksson 27'; Spence (yellow card) 53'; Cuthbert (yellow card) 69'	Report	Babajide (yellow card) 65'	Stadium: Kingsmeadow; Attendance: 1,528; Referee: Stacey Pearson

Sun 4 Nov 2018 8	West Ham United	0–2	Chelsea	Rush Green
15:00 GMT	Flaherty (yellow card) 29'; de Graaf (yellow card) 50'	Report	Bachmann 62', 85'; Andersson (yellow card) 83'	Stadium: Rush Green Stadium; Attendance: 962; Referee: Paul Howard

Sun 18 Nov 2018 9	Chelsea	5–0	Yeovil Town	Kingston upon Thames
14:00 GMT	Bright 20'; Ji 27'; Cuthbert 42'; Bachmann 45'; Carney (yellow card) 76'; England 79'	Report	Cousins (red card) 40'	Stadium: Kingsmeadow; Attendance: 1,484; Referee: Kirsty Dowle

Sun 2 Dec 2018 10	Chelsea	1–0	Reading	Kingston upon Thames
14:00 GMT	Ji 49'	Report		Stadium: Kingsmeadow; Attendance: 1,741; Referee: Lucy Oliver

Sun 9 Dec 2018 11	Brighton & Hove Albion	0–4	Chelsea	Crawley
14:30 GMT		Report	Eriksson (yellow card) 59' (goal) 65'; England 69', 90+1'; Ji 76'	Stadium: Broadfield Stadium; Attendance: 733; Referee: David Rick

Sun 6 Jan 2019 12	Chelsea	3–0	Everton	Kingston upon Thames
14:00 BST	England 6'; Spence 60'; Blundell 68'	Report		Stadium: Kingsmeadow; Attendance: 3,221; Referee: Lee Brennan

Sun 13 Jan 2019 13	Arsenal	1–2	Chelsea	Borehamwood, Hertfordshire
12:30 BST	Miedema 80'	Report	Cuthbert 26', 63'; Carney (yellow card) 38'; Ingle (yellow card) 80'	Stadium: Meadow Park; Attendance: 3,019; Referee: Rebecca Welch

Sun 27 Jan 2019 14	Chelsea	2–3	Birmingham City	Kingston upon Thames
14:00 BST	Cuthbert 13', 83'; Bachmann (yellow card) 63'	Report	Follis 36'; Quinn 61'; Williams (yellow card) 82'; White 90+3'	Stadium: Kingsmeadow; Attendance: 2,053; Referee: Helen Conley

Sun 10 Feb 2019 15	Manchester City	2–2	Chelsea	Manchester
14:00 BST	Wullaert 12'; Stanway 24'; Walsh (yellow card) 90'	Report	Bright (yellow card) 6'; Spence (yellow card) 18'; Ji 50', 89'	Stadium: Academy Stadium; Attendance: 3,078; Referee: Matthew Dicicco

Wed 20 Feb 2019 16	Chelsea	6–0	Bristol City	Kingston upon Thames
19:30 BST	Kirby 2', 34', 82' (pen.); England 6', 61', 89'	Report	Pattinson (yellow card) 68'; Evans (yellow card) 82'	Stadium: Kingsmeadow; Attendance: 1,821; Referee: Tom Bishop

Thur 14 Mar 2019 17	Liverpool	0–4	Chelsea	Birkenhead
20:00 BST	L. Little (yellow card) 39'	Report	Kirby 17', 22' (pen.), 52'; Engman 90+4'	Stadium: Prenton Park; Attendance: 237; Referee: Joe Hull

Sun 31 Mar 2019 18	Chelsea	1–1	West Ham United	Kingston upon Thames
14:00 BST	Carter (yellow card) 15'; England 42'	Report	Reichardt (yellow card) 35'; Flaherty 65'	Stadium: Kingsmeadow; Attendance: 2,854; Referee: Stacey Pearson

Wed 7 May 2019 19	Yeovil Town	0–8	Chelsea	Dorchester
15:00 BST		Report	England 4', 27', 45+2'; Cuthbert 16', 51'; Engman 28'; Kirby 84', 87'	Stadium: The Avenue Stadium; Attendance: 843; Referee: Gary Parsons

Sun 12 May 2019 20	Reading	2–3	Chelsea	Buckinghamshire
14:00 BST	Harding 50'; Williams 52'; Allen (yellow card) 75'	Report	Ji 8'; Carney 51'; England 64'	Stadium: Adams Park; Attendance: 612; Referee: Abigail Bryne

==== League table ====
Pos	Team	Pld	W	D	L	GF	GA	GD	Pts	Qualification
1	Arsenal (C)	20	18	0	2	70	13	+57	54	Qualification for the Champions League knockout phase
2	Manchester City	20	14	5	1	53	17	+36	47	Qualification for the Champions League knockout phase
3	Chelsea	20	12	6	2	46	14	+32	42	
4	Birmingham City	20	13	1	6	29	17	+12	40	
5	Reading	20	8	3	9	33	30	+3	27	

Source: FA WSL
Rules for classification: 1) Points; 2) Goal difference; 3) Number of goals scored
(C) Champions

==== Results summary ====
Overall								Home						Away					
Pld	W	D	L	GF	GA	GD	Pts	W	D	L	GF	GA	GD	W	D	L	GF	GA	GD
20	12	6	2	46	14	+32	42	6	2	2	21	9	+12	6	4	0	25	5	+20

Last updated: 2 December 2018.
Source: FA WSL

==== Results by matchday ====
Matchday	1	2	3	4	5	6	7	8	9	10	11	12	13	14	15	16	17	18	19	20
Result	D	D	D	W	L	D	W	W	W	W	W	W	W	L	D	W	W	D	W	W
Position	5	5	6	5	5	5	4	4	3	3	3	3	3	3	3	3	3	3	3	3

Updated to match(es) played on 12 May 2019. Source: FA WSL
W = Win; D = Draw; L = Loss

=== FA Cup ===
Sun 3 Feb 2019 Fourth round proper	Everton	0–2	Chelsea	Cheshire
15:00 BST		Report	Spence 66'; Blundell 90+2'	Stadium: The Select Security Stadium; Referee: Dean Watson

Sun 17 Feb 2019 Fifth round proper	Chelsea	3–0	Arsenal	Kingston upon Thames
14:00 BST	England 5', 58'; Andersson 39'	Report	Mitchell (yellow card) 69'	Stadium: Kingsmeadow; Attendance: 2,232; Referee: Paul Howard

Sun 17 Mar 2019 Quarter-finals	Durham	0–1	Chelsea	Durham
12:00 BST		Report	Ji 28'	Stadium: New Ferens Park; Attendance: 1,629; Referee: David Richardson

Sun 14 Apr 2019 Semi-finals	Manchester City	1–0	Chelsea	Manchester
15:30 BST	Wullaert (yellow card) 60'; Stanway (yellow card) 75'; Eriksson 90+2' (o.g)	Report	Ingle (yellow card) 17'	Stadium: Academy Stadium; Referee: Rebecca Welch

=== WSL Cup ===
Group 1 South

Sun 19 Aug 2018 1	Chelsea	3–1	Brighton & Hove Albion	Kingston upon Thames
14:00 BST	Spence 45'; Kirby 68'; England 87'	Report	Whelan (yellow card) 59' (goal) 77'	Stadium: Kingsmeadow; Attendance: 1,095; Referee: Jack Packman

Sun 26 Aug 2018 2	London Bees	1–6	Chelsea	Canons Park
14:00 BST	Pickett 44'	Report	Bachmann 7', 45'; Spence 9', 36'; Kirby 79'; England 81'	Stadium: The Hive Stadium; Attendance: 374; Referee: Neil Morrison

Sun 16 Sept 2018 3	Crystal Palace	0–4	Chelsea	London
14:00 BST	Nuttall (yellow card) 31'; Nash (yellow card) 68'	Report	Engman 10'; England 56', 64'; Spence 59'	Stadium: The H2T Group Stadium; Attendance: 476; Referee: David Spain

Wed 5 Dec 2018 4	Chelsea	7–0	Yeovil Town	Kingston upon Thames
19:30 GMT	Engman 2', 77'; Spence 17', 63'; England 24'; Cousins 37' (o.g); Cuthbert 75'			Stadium: Kingsmeadow; Attendance: 916; Referee: Lisa Benn

Wed 12 Dec 2018 5	Tottenham Hotspur	0–5	Chelsea	Cheshunt
19:30 GMT	Naz (yellow card) 69'	Report	Cooper 11'; Riley 19' (yellow card) 68'; Carney 46'; England 60', 72'	Stadium: Cheshunt Stadium; Attendance: 358; Referee: Abigail Marriott

Pos	Team	Pld	W	WPEN	LPEN	L	GF	GA	GD	Pts	Qualification
1	Chelsea	5	5	0	0	0	25	2	+23	15	Advance to knock-out stage
2	Brighton & Hove Albion	5	3	0	1	1	15	8	+7	10	Advance to knock-out stage
3	Crystal Palace	5	2	1	0	2	10	12	−2	8	
4	Tottenham Hotspur	5	1	1	1	2	9	12	−3	6	
5	London Bees	5	1	1	0	3	9	19	−10	5	
6	Yeovil Town	5	0	0	1	4	2	17	−15	1	

Source: thefa.com
Rules for classification: 1) Points; 2) Goal difference; 3) Number of goals scored

==== Knockout rounds ====
Wed 9 Jan 2019 Quarter-finals	Chelsea	4–0	Reading	Kingston upon Thames
19:30 GMT	Kirby 3', 86'; Asante 37'; Riley 90+1'	Report		Stadium: Kingsmeadow; Attendance: 973; Referee: Abigail Marriott

Wed 6 Feb 2019 Semi-finals	Chelsea	0–2	Manchester City	Kingston upon Thames
19:30 GMT	Cooper (yellow card) 48'; Eriksson (yellow card) 56'	Report	Parris 49', 81'	Stadium: Kingsmeadow; Attendance: 1,358; Referee: David Rock

=== Champions League ===
==== Round of 32 ====
12 September 2018
15:00 BST

SFK 2000 (Bosnia and Herzegovina)	0–5	(England) Chelsea
Nikolic (yellow card) 48'; Bojat (yellow card) 52'; Spahić (yellow card) 81'; Hadžić (yellow card) 90+3'	Report	Bright 6'; Spence 22'; Thorisdottir 36'; Ji 87'; Engman 89'

Asim Ferhatović Hase Stadium, Sarajevo
Attendance: 2,200
Referee: Frida Nielsen (Denmark)
26 September 2018
19:30 BST

Chelsea (England)	6–0	(Bosnia and Herzegovina) SFK 2000
Spence 4'; Kirby 31', 77'; Mjelde 50'; Blundell 86'; Cuthbert 90'	Report

Kingsmeadow, Kingston upon Thames
Attendance: 667
Referee: Simona Ghisletta (Switzerland)

Chelsea won 11–0 on aggregate.

==== Round of 16 ====
17 October 2018
19:35 BST

(England) Chelsea	1–0	(Italy) Fiorentina
Carney 8' (pen.)	Report

Kingsmeadow, Kingston upon Thames
Attendance: 804
Referee: Stéphanie Frappart (France)
31 October 2018
18:30 BST

(Italy) Fiorentina	0–6	(England) Chelsea
	Report	Spence 23'; Kirby 38' 53' (pen.) 63'; Cuthbert 57'; Bachmann 67'

Stadio Artemio Franchi, Florence
Attendance: 3,015
Referee: Lina Lehtovaara (Finland)

Chelsea won 7–0 on aggregate.

==== Quarter-finals ====
21 March 2019
19:05 BST

Chelsea (England)	2–0	(France) Paris Saint-Germain
Blundell 73'; Cuthbert 88'	Report

Kingsmeadow, Kingston upon Thames
Attendance: 2,616
Referee: Ivana Martinčić (Croatia)
27 March 2019
18:00 BST

Paris Saint-Germain (France)	2–1	(England) Chelsea
Diani 47'; Berger 56' (o.g.)	Report	Mjelde 90+1'

Stade Jean-Bouin, Paris
Attendance: 13,220
Referee: Sandra Bastos (Portugal)

Chelsea won 3–2 on aggregate.

==== Semi-finals ====
21 April 2019
16:00 BST

Lyon (France)	2–1	(England) Chelsea
Cascarino 27'; Henry 39'	Report	Cuthbert 72'

Parc Olympique Lyonnais, Décines-Charpieu
Attendance: 22,911
Referee: Katalin Kulcsár (Hungary)
28 April 2019
14:00 BST

Chelsea (England)	1–1	(France) Lyon
Ji 34'	Report	Le Sommer 17'

Kingsmeadow, Kingston upon Thames
Attendance: 4,670
Referee: Sara Persson (Sweden)

Lyon won 3–2 on aggregate.
