= 2017 Chelsea L.F.C. season =

Chelsea Ladies FC
2017 season
- Manager: Emma Hayes
- Stadium: Wheatsheaf Park
- FA WSL: 1st
- FA Cup: Semi-finals
- Champions League: Semi-finals
Home colours	Away colours	Third colours

The 2017 season was Chelsea Ladies Football Club's 25th season of competitive football and its seventh season in the FA Women's Super League and at the top level of English women's football, being one of the league's foundation clubs.

Following a reorganisation of top-level women's football in England, the 2017 season only covered half of a traditional season's length, while the FA WSL shifted its calendar to match the traditional autumn-to-spring axis of football in Europe. For the same reason, there was no Champions League qualification nor relegation to be competed for.

== First team ==
As of 3 May 2017.

Squad No.	Name	Nationality	Date of birth (age)
Goalkeepers
1	Hedvig Lindahl	(Sweden)	29 April 1983 (age 42)
12	Becky Spencer	(England)	22 February 1991 (age 34)
28	Carly Telford	(England)	7 July 1987 (age 38)
40	Fran Kitching	(England)	17 February 1998 (age 27)
Defenders
3	Hannah Blundell	(England)	25 May 1994 (age 31)
5	Gilly Flaherty (vice-captain)	(England)	24 August 1991 (age 34)
6	Niamh Fahey	(Republic of Ireland)	13 October 1987 (age 38)
11	Claire Rafferty	(England)	11 January 1989 (age 37)
21	Deanna Cooper	(England)	
Midfielders
4	Millie Bright	(England)	21 August 1993 (age 32)
7	Gemma Davison	(England)	17 April 1987 (age 38)
8	Karen Carney	(England)	1 August 1987 (age 38)
10	Ji So-yun	(South Korea)	21 February 1991 (age 34)
15	Beth England	(England)	3 June 1994 (age 31)
17	Katie Chapman (captain)	(England)	15 June 1982 (age 43)
18	Maren Mjelde	(Norway)	6 November 1989 (age 36)
22	Erin Cuthbert	(Scotland)	19 July 1998 (age 27)
24	Drew Spence	(England)	23 October 1992 (age 33)
25	Jade Bailey	(England)	11 November 1995 (age 30)
Forwards
9	Eniola Aluko	(England)	21 February 1987 (age 38)
14	Fran Kirby	(England)	29 June 1993 (age 32)
19	Crystal Dunn	(United States)	3 July 1992 (age 33)
23	Ramona Bachmann	(Switzerland)	25 December 1990 (age 35)

== New contracts ==
No.	Pos	Player	Contract end	Date	Source
16	MF	(Portugal) Ana Borges	2018	19 December 2016	
3	DF	(England) Hannah Blundell	2019	11 January 2017	
4	MF	(England) Millie Bright	2020	11 January 2017	
12	GK	(England) Becky Spencer	2018	11 January 2017	
20	MF	(England) Jodie Brett	2017	11 January 2017	
29	FW	(England) Millie Farrow	2017	11 January 2017	
40	GK	(England) Fran Kitching	2017	11 January 2017	
8	MF	(England) Karen Carney	2020	23 March 2017	
1	GK	(Sweden) Hedvig Lindahl	2019	30 March 2017	
15	MF	Beth England	2019	20 April 2017	

== Transfers and loans ==
=== Transfers in ===
Entry date	Position	No.	Player	From club	Contract end	Fee	Ref.
22 November 2016	MF	18	(Norway) Maren Mjelde	(Norway) Avaldsnes IL	2018	Undisclosed	
6 December 2016	FW	23	(Switzerland) Ramona Bachmann	(Germany) VfL Wolfsburg	2019	Undisclosed	
8 December 2016	MF	22	(Scotland) Erin Cuthbert	(Scotland) Glasgow City	2019	Undisclosed	
3 January 2017	FW	19	(United States) Crystal Dunn	(United States) Washington Spirit	2018	Free	
13 February 2017	DF	21	(England) Deanna Cooper	(England) London Bees	Undisclosed	Undisclosed	
2 May 2017	GK	28	(England) Carly Telford	(England) Notts County	2017	Free	
15 July 2017	DF	16	(Sweden) Magdalena Eriksson	(Sweden) Linköpings FC women	2019	Undisclosed	

=== Transfers out ===
Exit date	Position	No.	Player	To club	Fee	Ref.
11 April 2017	MF	—	(England) Laura Coombs	(England) Liverpool	Undisclosed	

=== Loans out ===
Start date	End date	Position	No.	Player	To club	Fee	Ref.
19 December 2016	30 June 2017	MF	16	(Portugal) Ana Borges	(Portugal) Sporting CP	Undisclosed	
24 January 2017	31 May 2017	MF	20	(England) Jodie Brett	(England) Bristol City	Undisclosed	
24 January 2017	31 May 2017	FW	29	(England) Millie Farrow	(England) Bristol City	Undisclosed	

== Pre-season ==
6 February 2017 Friendly	Chelsea (England)	2–0	(South Korea) Hyundai Steel Red Angels	Carshalton
14:00	Mjelde; Bright	Report		Stadium: Carshalton Athletic FC

12 February 2017 Friendly	Chelsea (England)	2–2	(Sweden) FC Rosengård	Carshalton
11:00	Carney; Chapman	Report	Schelin; Masar McLeod	Stadium: Carshalton Athletic FC

17 February 2017 Friendly	Chelsea (England)	2–0	(Denmark) Fortuna Hjørring	Algarve, Portugal
16:00	Dunn; Aluko	Report

20 February 2017 Friendly	Chelsea (England)	3–0	(Norway) LSK Kvinner FK	Staines
14:00	Bachmann; Cuthbert	Report		Stadium: Staines Town FC

23 February 2017 Friendly	Manchester City (England)	Cancelled	(England) Chelsea	Manchester
16:00				Stadium: Academy Stadium

12 March 2017 Friendly	Chelsea (England)	1–0	(Sweden) Kristianstads DFF	Staines
14:00	Cuthbert	Report		Stadium: Staines Town FC

== Competitions ==
=== Women's Super League ===
==== Results summary ====
Overall								Home						Away					
Pld	W	D	L	GF	GA	GD	Pts	W	D	L	GF	GA	GD	W	D	L	GF	GA	GD
2	2	0	0	10	0	+10	6	1	0	0	6	0	+6	1	0	0	4	0	+4

Last updated: 4 May 2017.

==== Results by matchday ====
Matchday	1	2	3	4	5	6	7	8
Ground	H	A	H	A	A	H	A	A
Result	W	W						
Position	2	1						

Updated to match(es) played on 4 May 2017. Source: FA WSL
A = Away; H = Home; W = Win; D = Draw; L = Loss

==== Matches ====
30 April 2017 1	Chelsea	6–0	Yeovil Town	Staines
14:00	Ji 45', 45+1'; Spence 54'; Cuthbert 67'; Dunn 73'; Bachmann 75'	Box; Report		Stadium: Staines Town FC; Attendance: 1,077; Referee: Ian Fissenden

3 May 2017 2	Reading	0–4	Chelsea	High Wycombe
19:35	Allen (yellow card) 18'; Moore (yellow card) 90'; Furness (yellow card) 90'	Report	Carney 32'; Spence 64'; Ji 69'; Blundell 81'; Chapman (yellow card) 90'	Stadium: Adams Park; Attendance: 797; Referee: Christopher O’Donnell

17 May 2017 3	Chelsea	2–2	Arsenal	Staines
19:35	Bachmann 7', 35'	Report	Carter 10'; Nobbs 87'	Stadium: Staines Town FC; Attendance: 1,009; Referee: Aji Ajibola

21 May 2017 4	Sunderland	0–7	Chelsea	Hetton-le-Hole
14:00		Report	Bachmann 15'; Chapman 21'; Cuthbert 38', 53'; Carney 60'; Kirby 65'; Flaherty 80'	Stadium: Hetton Centre; Attendance: 775; Referee: Lucy Oliver

25 May 2017 5	Manchester City	1–0	Chelsea	Manchester
19:00	Stanway 57'	Report		Stadium: Academy Stadium; Attendance: 1,069; Referee: Simeon Lucas

28 May 2017 6	Chelsea	7–0	Liverpool	Staines
12:05	Aluko 3', 60'; Kirby 13', 45'; Carney 32'; Ji 67'; Spence 84'	Report		Stadium: Staines Town FC; Attendance: 1,654; Referee: Jakub Myles

31 May 2017 7	Bristol City	0–4	Chelsea	Bristol
19:05		Report	Bachmann 23', 69'; Kirby 35'; Cuthbert 83'	Stadium: Stoke Gifford Stadium; Attendance: 823; Referee: Richard Hulme

3 June 2017 8	Birmingham City	0–2	Chelsea	Solihull
15:30		Report	Bright 38'; Kirby 66'	Stadium: Damson Park; Attendance: 1,171; Referee: Daniel Middleton

=== FA Cup ===
19 March 2017 Fifth round	Chelsea	7–0	Doncaster	Staines
	Dunn 12'; Ji 33', 37'; Little 41' (o.g.); Bachmann 45'; Chapman 70'; Spence 72'	Report		Stadium: Wheatsheaf Park; Attendance: 806

26 March 2017 Sixth round	Chelsea	5–1	Sunderland	Staines
	Bachmann 39', 44'; Blundell 49', 58'; Spence 90'	Report	Staniforth 18' (pen.)	Stadium: Wheatsheaf Park

17 April 2017 Semi-final	Birmingham City	1–1 (a.e.t.) (4–2 p)	Chelsea	Solihull
	Sargeant 64'	Report	Spence 88'	Stadium: Damson Park; Attendance: 1,425

== Honours ==
- 2017 BBC Women's Footballer of the Year: (Sweden) Hedvig Lindahl (finalist)
- 2016–17 PFA Players' Player of the Year: (England) Karen Carney (finalist)
- 2016–17 PFA Young Player of the Year: (England) Millie Bright (finalist)
- 2016–17 PFA Team of the Year: (England) Eniola Aluko, (England) Karen Carney
- 2016–17 FA Cup Player of the Round: (Switzerland) Ramona Bachmann (sixth round)
- Football Black List: (England) Eniola Aluko
