= Hannah Blundell =

English footballer (born 1994)

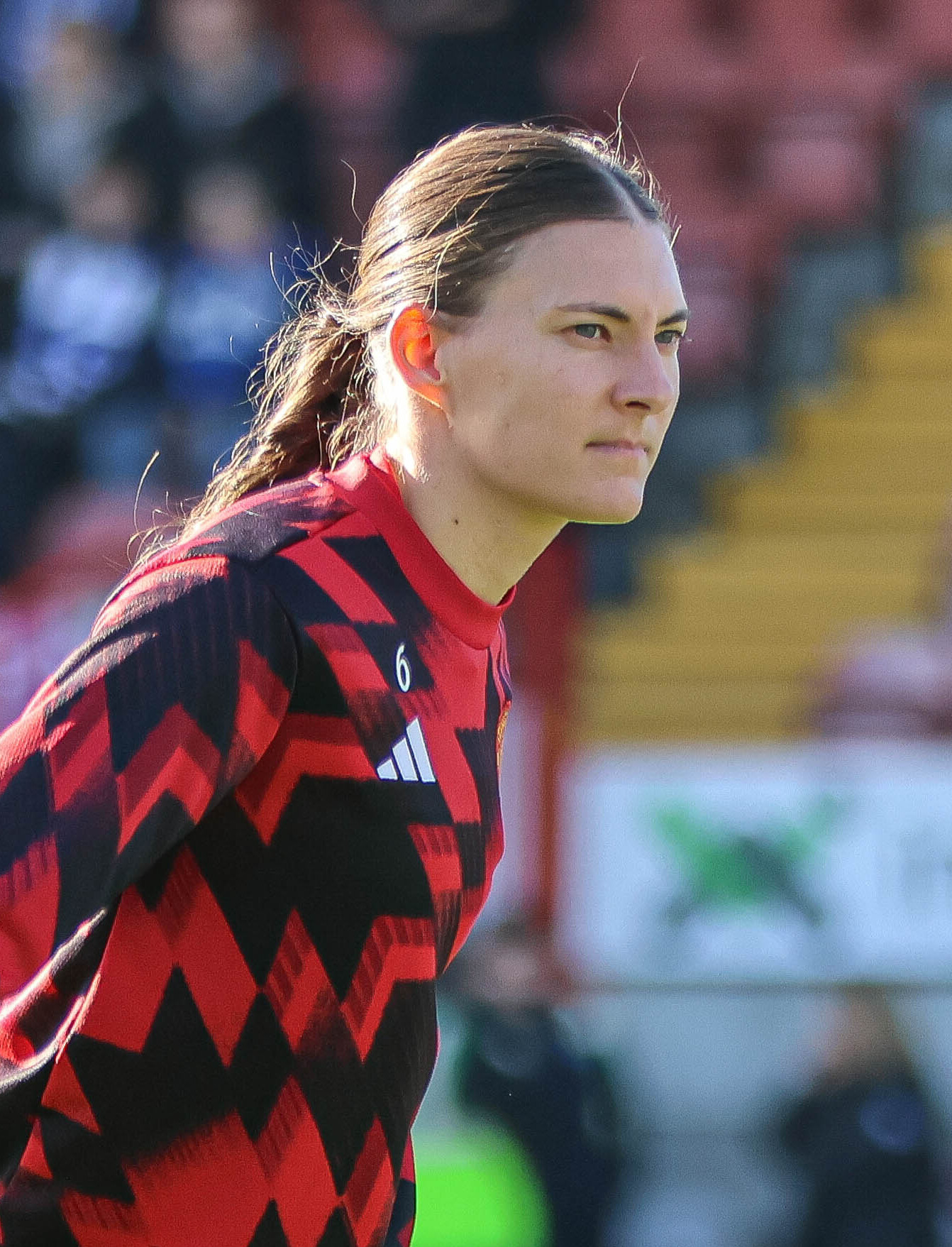
- Blundell with Manchester United in 2025

Personal information
- Full name: Hannah Jayne Blundell
- Date of birth: 25 May 1994 (age 32)
- Place of birth: Eastbourne, England
- Height: 1.63 m (5 ft 4 in)
- Position: Right-back

Team information
- Current team: Everton
- Number: 2

Youth career
- 2001–2003: Polegate Grasshoppers
- 2003–2005: Brighton & Hove Albion
- 2005–2006: Chelsea
- 2006–2010: Charlton Athletic
- 2010–2013: Chelsea

Senior career*
Years	Team	Apps	(Gls)
2013–2021	Chelsea	98	(6)
2021–2026	Manchester United	68	(2)
2026	→ Everton (loan)	10	(0)
2026–	Everton	2	(0)

International career^{‡}
2013	England U19	8	(0)
2014	England U20	3	(0)
2014–2017	England U23	15	(1)
2018	England	3	(0)
Medal record
Women's football
Representing England
UEFA Women's Under-19 Championship
Runner-up	2013 Wales
- * Club domestic league appearances and goals as of 04:56, 15 September 2026 (UTC) ‡ National team caps and goals as of 8 November 2018

Hannah Jayne Blundell (born 25 May 1994) is an English professional footballer who plays as a right-back for Women's Super League club Everton.

== Youth career ==
Blundell grew up in Eastbourne and began playing football for local youth team Polegate Grasshoppers, the team her two brothers already played for, at the age of seven. Two years later she was scouted to join the Brighton & Hove Albion Centre of Excellence. In 2005 she moved to Chelsea for a season, playing for the club's under-12 team. However, the Chelsea coaches raised concerns over Blundell's small size when she trialled to remain at the academy. She eventually had a successful trial at Charlton Athletic and remained in the team's academy for four years up to under-16 level.

In 2010, the chance presented itself for Blundell to return to Chelsea. She enrolled in a local college, living in the college's accommodation and playing for their football team while also training in the Chelsea academy during the week and travelling home at the weekend to play with Eastbourne Ladies with whom she won the Sussex County FA Women's Challenge Trophy in 2012. At 17, Blundell trialled for the Chelsea reserve team and was accepted, eventually studying for a third year in order to remain in the accommodation to stay with Chelsea.

== Club career ==
=== Chelsea ===
During her third year back in the Chelsea youth system, Emma Hayes took over as first team manager and began to integrate Blundell into first team training, helping the club get Blundell and teammate Drew Spence a flat next to the training ground. She made her debut on 28 May 2013 as a 70th-minute substitute for Ólína Guðbjörg Viðarsdóttir and scored three minutes later during a 2–1 defeat to Birmingham. She made eight league appearances including six starts for the Blues in 2013, predominantly playing at left-back despite being naturally right-sided, filling in for Claire Rafferty during her lengthy injury lay-off.

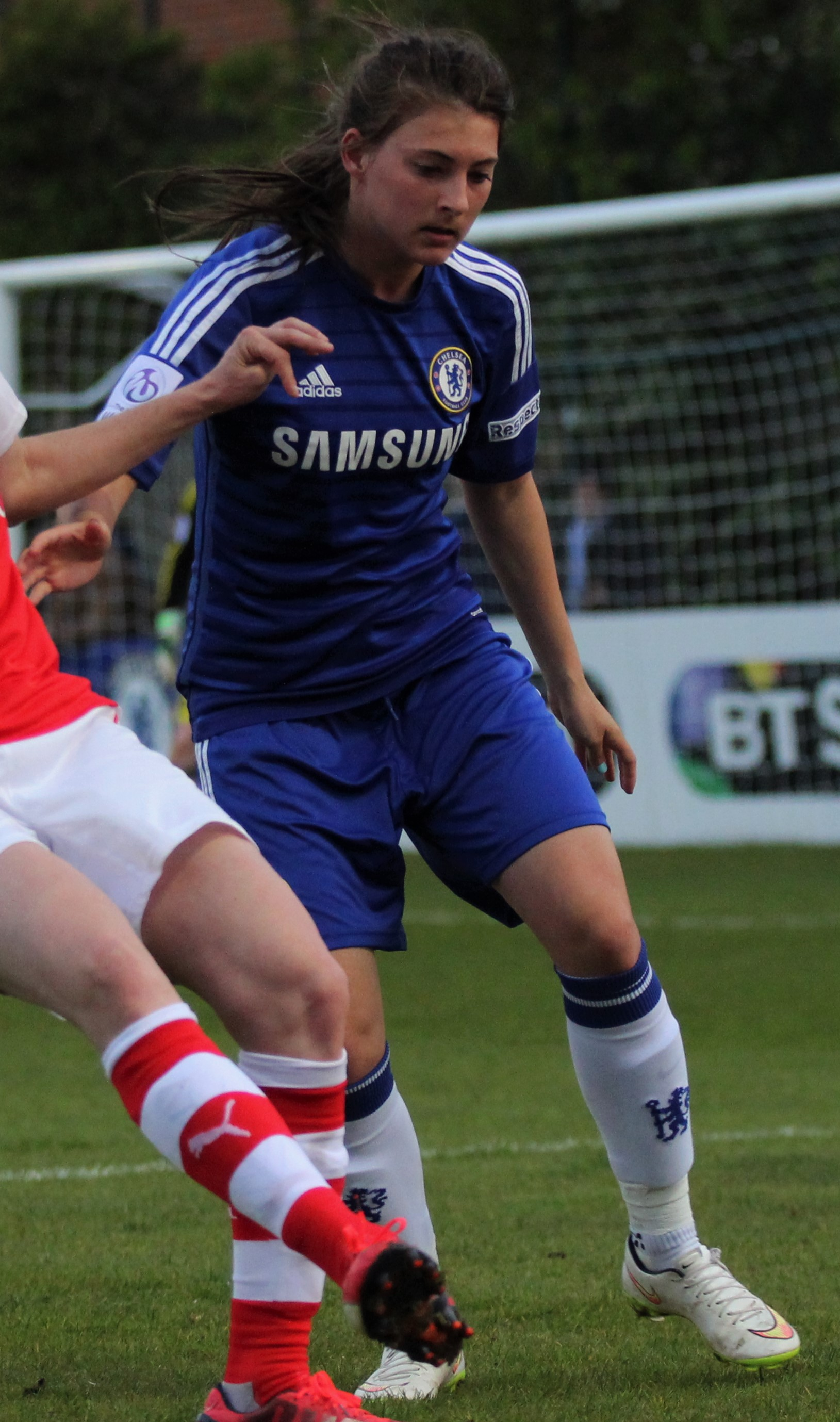
Blundell with Chelsea in 2015

After a strong 2014 season, starting in 12 of Chelsea's 14 WSL games, Blundell was nominated for the PFA Women's Young Player of the Year award, losing out to Leah Williamson. She was again nominated for the same award a year later as Chelsea did the double, winning their first WSL title and FA Cup with Blundell playing the entire final, the first to be held at Wembley Stadium. This time she lost out to Beth Mead. Blundell was, however, named as the club's Young Player of the Year, shared with Millie Bright. In January 2017, she signed a new two-year contract. Blundell remained Chelsea's first-choice right-back for the following two seasons.

During the 2019–20 season opener, Blundell suffered a quad injury which kept her sidelined for 11 weeks with Maren Mjelde laying claim to the starting role in her absence. In February 2020, Blundell signed a new two-and-a-half-year contract until June 2022. However, by the following season, Blundell had also fallen behind out-of-position winger Niamh Charles in the depth chart, starting just 6 of Chelsea's 39 games with Charles and veteran Jessica Carter starting as full-backs ahead of Blundell in the 4–0 2021 UEFA Women's Champions League Final defeat to Barcelona.

=== Manchester United ===
On 23 July 2021, Manchester United announced the signing of Blundell on a two-year deal with the option of a further year. The move was part of the transfer that saw Lauren James join Chelsea. In her second season with the club, Blundell was voted Players' Player of the Season by her teammates.

After missing the entire 2024–25 season through maternity leave, Blundell made her first appearance for United since May 2024 during a 3–2 victory against Brighton & Hove Albion on 2 November 2025. She departed the club following the expiration of her contract at the end of the 2025–26 season, having made 95 appearances and scored 3 goals for United.

=== Everton ===
On 9 January 2026, Blundell joined Everton on loan for the remainder of the 2025–26 season, making 10 appearances during this spell. She signed for the club on a permanent deal on 20 July 2026.

== International ==
=== Youth ===
Blundell was part of the England U19 squad that finished as runners-up to France at the 2013 UEFA Women's Under-19 Championship, making one start and a further four substitute appearances. The result qualified England for the 2014 FIFA U-20 Women's World Cup. Blundell started all three games as England finished third in the group and were eliminated.

=== Senior ===
In October 2015, Blundell was called-up to the senior England team by Mark Sampson for the 2015 Yongchuan International Tournament but was an unused substitute in both games. She was an unused substitute in January 2017 in a friendly against Sweden, and again for friendlies against Italy and Austria as Sampson prepared for UEFA Women's Euro 2017. Blundell was not named to the final tournament squad.

Blundell eventually made her senior international debut under Phil Neville during the final match of the 2018 SheBelieves Cup on 8 March 2018, as an 87-minute substitute for Demi Stokes in a 1–0 defeat to the United States. She started in her second appearance and registered an assist on a Rachel Daly goal as part of a 6–0 2019 FIFA Women's World Cup qualifying win against Kazakhstan. After winning her third cap against Austria in November 2018, Blundell was named to England squads twice in 2019: for a friendly against New Zealand in June, and for a double header of friendlies against Belgium and Norway in August but did not feature in any of the games.

Blundell was allotted 203 when the FA announced their legacy numbers scheme to honour the 50th anniversary of England’s inaugural international.

== Personal life ==
As of 2022, she was dating professional footballer Tom Pett. They were married at Fanhams Hall on 15 June 2024. On 11 September 2024, Blundell announced that she was pregnant with her first child. She gave birth to her daughter Romi in March 2025.

== Career statistics ==
=== Club ===
As of match played 13 September 2026.

Appearances and goals by club, season and competition
Club	Season	League			FA Cup (Note: Includes the Women's FA Cup)		League Cup (Note: Includes the FA Women's League Cup)		Continental (Note: Includes the UEFA Women's Champions League)		Total	
Club	Season	Division	Apps	Goals	Apps	Goals	Apps	Goals	Apps	Goals	Apps	Goals
Chelsea	2013	Women's Super League	8	1	1	0	0	0	—		9	1
Chelsea	2014	Women's Super League	12	2	2	0	3	0	—		17	2
Chelsea	2015	Women's Super League	12	0	4	0	5	0	3	0	24	0
Chelsea	2016	Women's Super League	15	0	4	0	1	0	2	0	22	0
Chelsea	2017	Women's Super League	5	1	3	2	—		—		8	3
Chelsea	2017–18	Women's Super League	13	0	3	0	1	0	8	0	25	0
Chelsea	2018–19	Women's Super League	17	1	3	1	3	0	6	2	29	4
Chelsea	2019–20	Women's Super League	8	1	2	0	4	0	0	0	14	1
Chelsea	2020–21	Women's Super League	8	0	1	0	2	0	2	0	13	0
Chelsea	Total		98	6	23	3	19	0	21	2	161	11
Manchester United	2021–22	Women's Super League	21	0	2	0	6	0	—		29	0
Manchester United	2022–23	Women's Super League	22	1	4	1	3	0	—		29	2
Manchester United	2023–24	Women's Super League	22	1	5	0	4	0	2	0	33	1
Manchester United	2024–25	Women's Super League	0	0	0	0	0	0	—		0	0
Manchester United	2025–26	Women's Super League	3	0	0	0	1	0	0	0	4	0
Manchester United	Total		68	2	11	1	14	0	2	0	95	3
Everton (loan)	2025–26	Women's Super League	10	0	2	0	0	0	—		12	0
Everton	2026–27	Women's Super League	2	0	0	0	0	0	—		2	0
Career total			178	8	36	4	33	0	23	2	270	14

=== International ===
As of match played 8 November 2018

Appearances and goals by national team and year
National team	Year	Apps	Goals
England	2018	3	0
Total		3	0

== Honours ==
Chelsea

- FA Women's Super League: 2015, 2017–18, 2019–20, 2020–21
- Women's FA Cup: 2014–15, 2017–18
- FA Women's League Cup: 2019–20, 2020–21
- FA WSL Spring Series
- Community Shield: 2020
- UEFA Women's Champions League runner-up: 2020–21

Manchester United

- Women's FA Cup: 2023–24; runner-up: 2022–23

England

- UEFA Women's Under-19 Championship runner-up: 2013
- SheBelieves Cup runner-up: 2018

Individual

- PFA WSL Team of the Year: 2017–18, 2018–19
- Manchester United Women's Players' Player of the Year: 2022–23
