= Sophie Walton =

English footballer

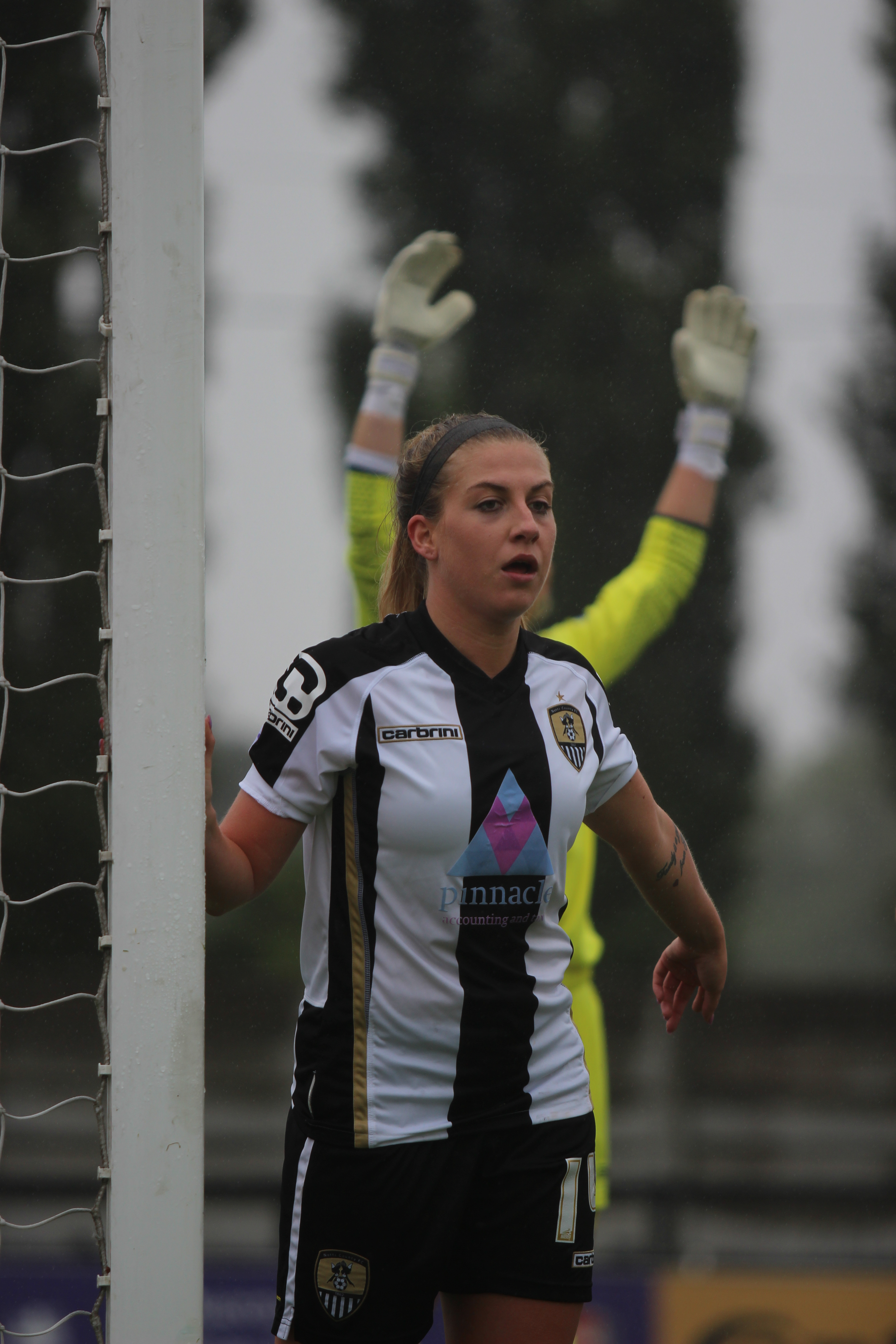
- Sophie Walton playing for Notts County in July 2015

Personal information
- Full name: Sophie Katrina Walton
- Date of birth: 7 November 1989 (age 37)
- Place of birth: Leeds, England
- Position: Midfielder

Youth career
- Sherburn White Rose
- Leeds United

Senior career*
Years	Team	Apps	(Gls)
2005–2010	Leeds United		
2011–2015	Notts County	61	(0)
2017–2018	Doncaster Rovers Belles	16	(1)
2018–2019	Guiseley Vixens	28	(3)
2019–2020	Nottingham Forest	12	(0)
2020–2022	Sheffield United	22	(0)
- * Club domestic league appearances and goals

Sophie Katrina Walton (born 7 November 1989) is an English retired footballer who played as a midfielder. She played for Leeds United, Notts County, Doncaster Rovers Belles, and Sheffield United. She represented England at youth level.

== Club career ==
Walton grew up in Sherburn-in-Elmet and played football for Sherburn White Rose before joining Leeds United under-12s at the age of nine. In September 2005, she made her Premier League debut for Leeds in a 2–0 defeat at Charlton Athletic.

On 11 February 2010 Walton started a 3–1 Premier League Cup final win over Everton, to help Leeds win their first major silverware, following defeats in the FA Women's Cup finals of 2006 and 2008, as well as the Premier League Cup final in 2007.

When Leeds failed to gain entry to the new FA WSL, Walton reportedly signed for local rivals Doncaster Rovers Belles. But when the inaugural 2011 FA WSL season started, Walton instead lined up for Lincoln Ladies. She remained with the club after their relocation to Notts County for the 2014 FA WSL season, and played in the 2015 FA Women's Cup Final, a 1–0 defeat by Chelsea at Wembley Stadium.

Walton left Notts County on the expiry of her contract and sat out the 2016 season due to pregnancy and childbirth. She agreed to join FA WSL 2 club Doncaster Rovers Belles in January 2017. Doncaster Rovers Belles won the WSL 2 league title but renounced their place in the new FA Women's Championship, sparking a player exodus which saw Walton join Guiseley Vixens in July 2018.

She retired in April 2022.

== International career ==
Walton represented England at Under-15, Under-17, Under-19 and Under-23 level, as well as at the 2008 FIFA U-20 Women's World Cup in Chile.

== Personal life ==
Her older brother Simon Walton is also a footballer, who began his own career at Leeds United.

In August 2016 Walton gave birth to a son Alfie-J, with her footballer partner Jake Cassidy. She graduated from Leeds Beckett University with a business management degree and founded a modelling agency at the age of 23, which she later put on hold to focus on football.

Both Sophie and Simon Walton studied at Boston Spa Academy during their time as Leeds United Academy scholars.
