= Millie Bright =

English footballer (born 1993)

Millie Bright OBE
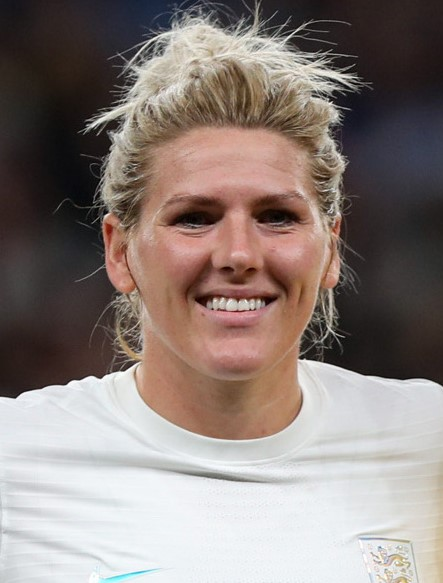
- Bright with England in 2022.

Personal information
- Full name: Millie Bright
- Date of birth: 21 August 1993 (age 33)
- Place of birth: Chesterfield, England
- Height: 5 ft 10 in (1.78 m)
- Position: Defender

Youth career
- Killamarsh Dynamos
- Sheffield United

Senior career*
Years	Team	Apps	(Gls)
2009–2014	Doncaster Belles	42	(3)
2011–2012	→ Leeds Ladies (loan)	13	(6)
2014–2026	Chelsea	184	(9)
Total		239	(18)

International career
2011–2012	England U19	5	(0)
2013–2016	England U23	13	(0)
2016–2025	England	88	(6)
2021	Great Britain	3	(0)
Medal record
Women's football
Representing England
UEFA Women's Championship
Winner	2022 England
FIFA Women's World Cup
Runner-up	2023 Australia and New Zealand
- * Club domestic league appearances and goals

Millie Bright OBE (born 21 August 1993) is an English former professional footballer who played as a centre-back.

After beginning her club career with Doncaster Belles and Leeds Ladies, Bright joined Chelsea in 2014 and remained with the club for the rest of her career, serving as club captain in her final three seasons. She represented England on the under-19, under-23 and senior national teams.

Bright was named Vauxhall England Young Player of the Year in 2016. With Chelsea, she won twenty honours, including eight league titles and a domestic treble in both the 2020–21 and 2024–25 seasons. In 2020, she helped the club win the 2020 Women's FA Community Shield.

Bright was named to the PFA Team of the Year for the 2017–18 and 2019–20 seasons. In 2020, 2021 and 2025, she was named to the FIFA FIFPro Women's World11.

== Early life ==
Born in Chesterfield, Derbyshire, England, Bright spent her youngest years immersed in equestrianism. She developed pneumonia as a baby and spent some of her early childhood in the hospital with bouts of asthma. As a youth, Bright attended Sheffield Road School and Killamarsh Junior School, followed by Eckington School. Bright began playing football at age nine. After watching a friend play for Killamarsh Dynamos, a local team in Derbyshire, she decided to join; as part of the "Where Greatness Is Made" campaign, a plaque honouring Bright was installed at the club in 2022. She was later scouted by Sheffield United and joined their academy team until age 16 before moving to Doncaster Rovers Belles in 2009.

== Club career ==
=== Doncaster Rovers Belles ===
Described by the club as "a tall, powerful, athletic striker with an good eye for goal," Bright made her Belles debut as a substitute against Watford at the Keepmoat Stadium in August 2009. She scored her first goal on the occasion of her first start, in the following month's 5–0 FA Women's Premier League Cup win at Leeds City Vixens. She was awarded a contract for the inaugural 2011 season of the FA WSL, making five substitute appearances. At her own request, Bright then went on loan to Leeds United in their 2011–12 FA Women's Premier League season and debuted on her 18th birthday, scoring a goal after entering play as a substitute.

When Bright returned to Doncaster she had developed into a regular first team starter. Bright was critical of The Football Association's decision to demote Doncaster Rovers Belles from the WSL in favour of Manchester City one game into the 2013 season: "It was heartbreaking. It felt like we weren't respected or even wanted in the league, purely based on money. It should be about the level you play at, not how much money you have. That season, we just felt what's the point?"

=== Chelsea ===
In December 2014, Bright signed with Chelsea ahead of the 2015 season. Chelsea assistant manager Paul Green said of the signing, "Millie is a great character and a young player who is hungry to develop and improve her game. She has a lot of experience for a 21-year-old and has already played a lot of games in the FA WSL and knows what the league is all about. She will add strength and physicality to the squad and I’m sure that she will prove to be a good addition to this talented group of players as we look to build on last season’s achievements." Chelsea finished in first place during the regular season with a 10–2–2 record and qualified for the 2016–17 UEFA Women's Champions League for the second time in the team's history. Bright made fourteen appearances for Chelsea during the 2015 season tallying a total of 906 minutes. She was named Chelsea Players’ Player of the Year by her teammates.

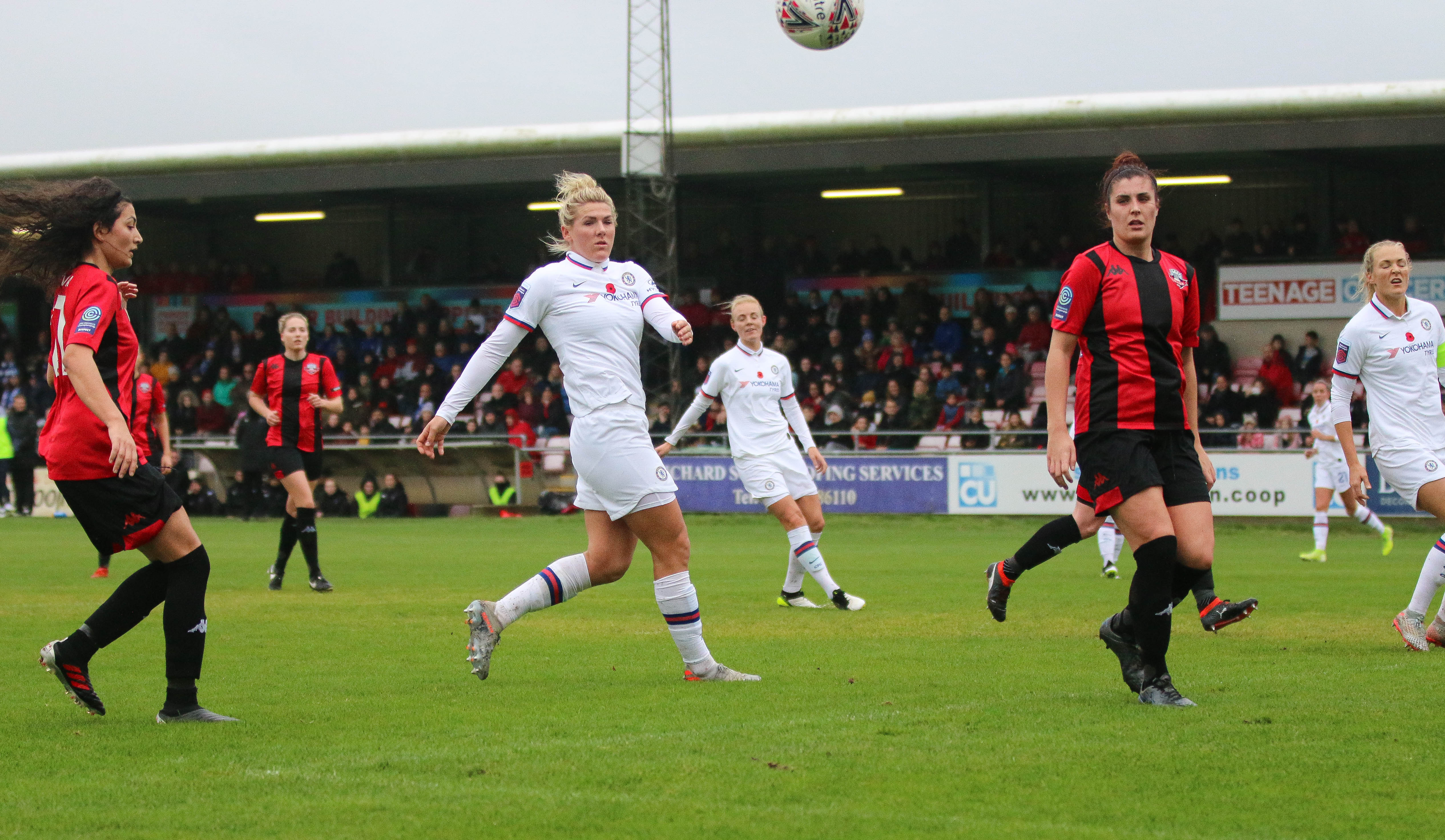
Bright (centre) during a match against Lewes FC during the 2019–20 FA Women's League Cup, November 2019

During the 2016 season, Bright was a starting defender in all 15 games that she played and scored a goal in the team's 5–0 win over Sunderland. Chelsea finished in second place with a 12–3–1 record.

Bright was Chelsea's starting left-side defender for the 2017 FA WSL Spring Series and helped lead the defensive line to concede only five goals in all competitions. She scored two goals during attacking set-pieces against Bristol and Arsenal. Chelsea won the Spring Series with an 8–6–1 record.

In August 2018, Bright signed a new three-year contract with Chelsea. Of the signing, she said, "I just want to be a successful player and to help my team-mates and this football club win more trophies. We've already won a few in my time here and hopefully we can continue that and keep winning things, and I hope the Champions League is one of those trophies. We made a big statement in the competition last season and we're ready to keep developing and take the next step."

During the 2019–20 FA WSL season, Bright was named the league's Player of the Month for December after she scored and provided an assist against Birmingham and led the Chelsea defense in a shut-out against Manchester United. Chelsea won the regular season with a 12–3–0 record as well as the 2019–20 FA Women's League Cup after defeating Arsenal 2–1 in the Final.

When the 2020 Women's FA Community Shield was played for the first time since 2008, Bright scored Chelsea's game-winning goal from long range during the team's 2–0 over Manchester City.

Following the departure of Magdalena Eriksson, Bright was named captain of Chelsea on 29 September 2023.

On 6 March 2025, it was announced that Bright had signed a new contract with Chelsea until summer 2026.

Bright announced her retirement from football with immediate effect on 29 April 2026. Her final appearance for Chelsea had come two months prior, in which she suffered an ankle injury in a WSL match against Tottenham Hotspur on 8 February. In total, Bright made 314 appearances for Chelsea across 12 years, retiring as their all time record appearance holder, and scored 19 goals for the club. Following her retirement, Bright remained with Chelsea as a club ambassador.

== International career ==
Bright has represented England on the senior national team as well as numerous youth national teams, including the under-19 and under-23 national team squads. In June 2016, she scored a penalty kick goal against the United States during the final game of the Nordic Cup.

Bright earned her first cap for the senior England national team in September 2016, as a last-minute substitute in a 2–0 win over Belgium. In February 2019, Bright pulled out of the England squad for the SheBelieves Cup due to injury, and was replaced by Gemma Bonner.

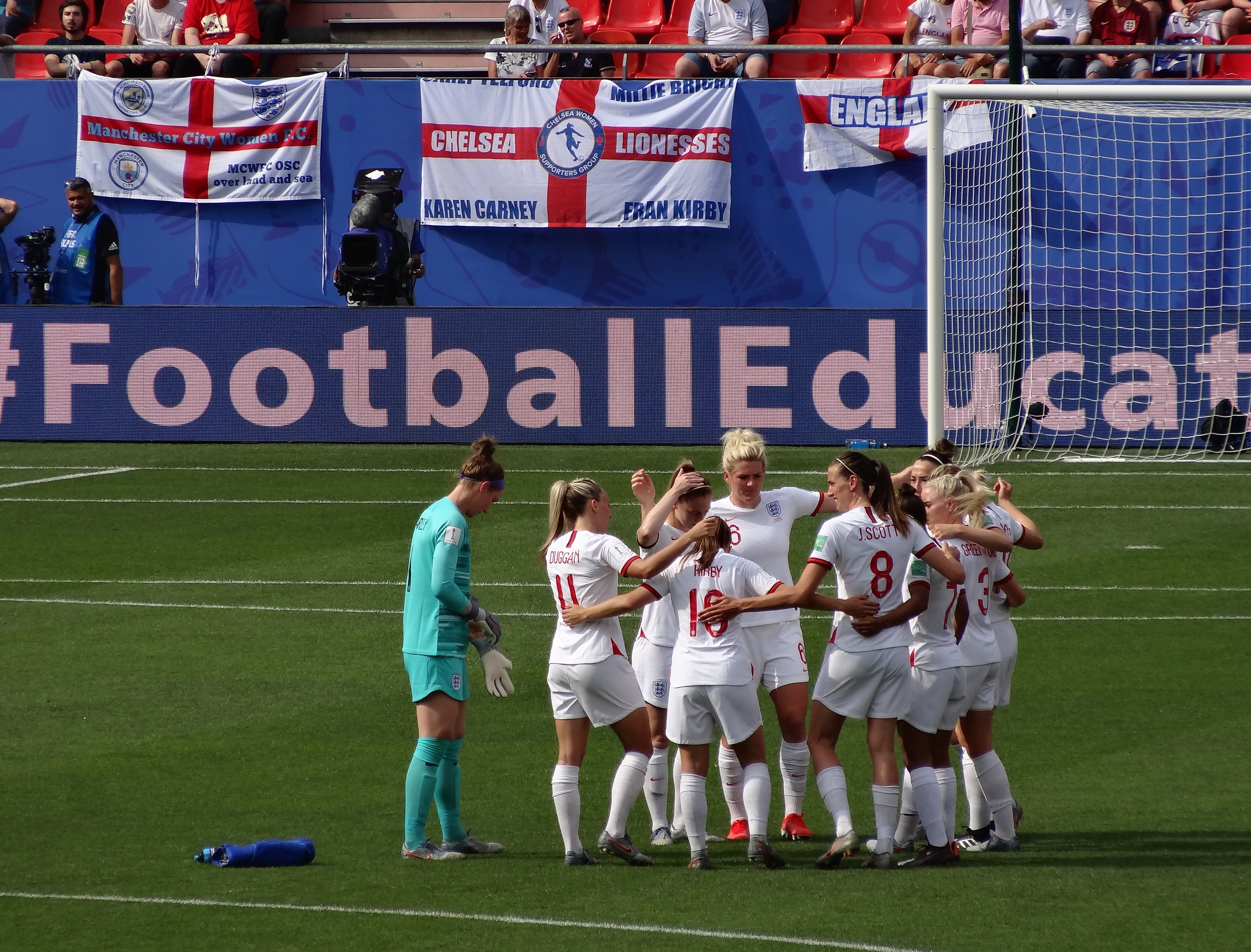
Bright huddles with England national team squad during the 2019 FIFA World Cup in France

In May 2019, Bright was selected to represent England at the 2019 FIFA Women's World Cup in France. She played in two of the three group matches as well as in the Round of 16, Quarter Final and Semi Final. She was sent off in the 2–1 semifinal loss to the United States after receiving a second yellow card. She captained England for the first time in a friendly game against Canada on 13 April 2021. She was again called on to captain the squad by head coach Sarina Wiegman in the two November World Cup qualifiers against Austria and Latvia.

In June 2022, Bright was included in the England squad which won UEFA Women's Euro 2022.

Bright was allotted 197 when the FA announced their legacy numbers scheme to honour the 50th anniversary of England’s inaugural international.

On 31 May 2023, Bright was named to the squad for the 2023 FIFA Women's World Cup in July 2023. Due to Leah Williamson being injured, Bright was named interim captain for the tournament. On 16 August 2023, Bright assisted one of the three goals that got England into its first World Cup final.

Having withdrawn from the previous England squad to undertake "an extended period of recovery", Bright announced on 4 June 2025 that she had made herself unavailable for selection for UEFA Women's Euro 2025, stating that she was unable to "give 100% mentally or physically" ahead of the tournament. Four months later, on 13 October, Bright announced her retirement from international football, having played for 9 years with a total of 88 caps for England. She described her retirement as being "a decision I have taken to ensure I can commit fully to my club football and give Chelsea everything they need from me."

== Awards ==
Bright was appointed Officer of the Order of the British Empire (OBE) in the 2024 New Year Honours for services to association football.

She became the first person to be awarded the Freedom of Derbyshire in July 2024 and was also given two honorary doctorates, one each by the University of Derby and the University of Sheffield, in the same month.

In September 2024, Reigate and Banstead Borough Council made Bright an Honorary Freewoman, which meant she was the first woman to hold an honorary title in that Surrey borough.

== Career statistics ==
=== Club ===
Appearances and goals by club, season and competition
Club	Season	League			National cup (Note: Includes Women's FA Cup)		League cup (Note: Includes FA Women's League Cup)		Continental (Note: Includes UEFA Women's Champions League)		Total	
Club	Season	Division	Apps	Goals	Apps	Goals	Apps	Goals	Apps	Goals	Apps	Goals
Doncaster Belles	2009–10	Women's Premier League	10	0	?	?	1	1	—		11	1
Doncaster Belles	2011	Women's Super League	5	0	?	?	0	0	—		5	0
Doncaster Belles	2012	Women's Super League	13	2	?	?	2	0	—		15	2
Doncaster Belles	2013	Women's Super League	14	1	?	?	3	0	—		17	1
Doncaster Belles	2014	Women's Super League 2	?	?	?	?	5	0	—		5	0
Doncaster Belles	Total		42	3	?	?	11	1	0	0	53	4
Leeds United (loan)	2010–11	Women's National League	13	6	0	0	0	0	—		13	6
Chelsea	2015	Women's Super League	14	0	?	?	4	1	4	0	22	1
Chelsea	2016	Women's Super League	15	1	2	0	1	1	2	0	20	2
Chelsea	2017	Women's Super League	7	2	?	?	—		—		7	2
Chelsea	2017–18	Women's Super League	15	1	2	0	5	0	8	0	30	1
Chelsea	2018–19	Women's Super League	16	1	?	?	3	0	6	1	25	2
Chelsea	2019–20	Women's Super League	15	1	3	0	6	0	—		24	1
Chelsea	2020–21	Women's Super League	21	1	1	1	5	0	9	1	36	3
Chelsea	2021–22	Women's Super League	22	0	5	0	3	0	6	0	36	0
Chelsea	2022–23	Women's Super League	14	1	3	0	3	0	5	1	25	2
Chelsea	2023–24	Women's Super League	10	1	0	0	0	0	2	0	12	1
Chelsea	2024–25	Women's Super League	21	0	5	0	2	0	8	0	36	0
Chelsea	2025–26	Women's Super League	14	0	1	1	2	1	4	0	21	2
Chelsea	Total		184	9	22	2	34	3	54	3	294	17
Career total			239	18	22	2	45	4	54	3	360	27

=== International ===
Appearances and goals by national team and year
National team	Year	Apps	Goals
England	2016	1	0
England	2017	17	0
England	2018	7	0
England	2019	9	0
England	2020	3	0
England	2021	8	3
England	2022	19	2
England	2023	13	0
England	2024	7	0
England	2025	4	1
Total		88	6

National team	Year	Apps	Goals
Great Britain	2021	3	0
Total		3	0

Scores and results list England's goal tally first, score column indicates score after each Bright goal.

List of international goals scored by Millie Bright
No.	Date	Venue	Opponent	Score	Result	Competition	Ref.
1	21 September 2021	Stade de Luxembourg, Luxembourg City, Luxembourg	Luxembourg	7–0	10–0	2023 FIFA World Cup qualification	
2	21 September 2021	Stade de Luxembourg, Luxembourg City, Luxembourg	Luxembourg	8–0	10–0	2023 FIFA World Cup qualification	
3	26 October 2021	Daugava Stadium, Liepāja, Latvia	Latvia	4–0	10–0	2023 FIFA World Cup qualification	
4	17 February 2022	Riverside Stadium, Middlesbrough, England	Canada	1–0	1–1	2022 Arnold Clark Cup	
5	23 February 2022	Molineux Stadium, Wolverhampton, England	Germany	2–1	3–1	2022 Arnold Clark Cup	
6	4 April 2025	Ashton Gate, Bristol, England	Belgium	2–0	5–0	2025 UEFA Nations League A	

== Honours ==
Chelsea

- FA WSL: 2015, Spring Series, 2017–18, 2019–20, 2020–21, 2021–22, 2022–23, 2023–24, 2024–25
- FA Women's Cup: 2014–15, 2017–18 2020–21, 2021–22, 2022–23, 2024–25
- FA Women's League Cup: 2019–20, 2020–21, 2024–25, 2025–26
- FA Community Shield: 2020
- UEFA Women's Champions League runner-up: 2020–21

England

- FIFA Women's World Cup runner-up: 2023
- UEFA Women's Championship: 2022
- Arnold Clark Cup: 2022, 2023

Individual

- Vauxhall England Young Player of the Year: 2016
- FA WSL PFA Team of the Year: 2017–18, 2019–20, 2021–22, 2024–25
- FA Women's Super League Player of the Month: December 2019
- FIFA FIFPro Women's World11: 2020, 2021
- Arnold Clark Cup Golden Boot: 2022
- Freedom of the City of London (announced 1 August 2022)

== See also ==
- List of UEFA Women's Championship goalscorers
- List of England women's international footballers
