= Lucy Watson (footballer) =

English footballer (born 2003)

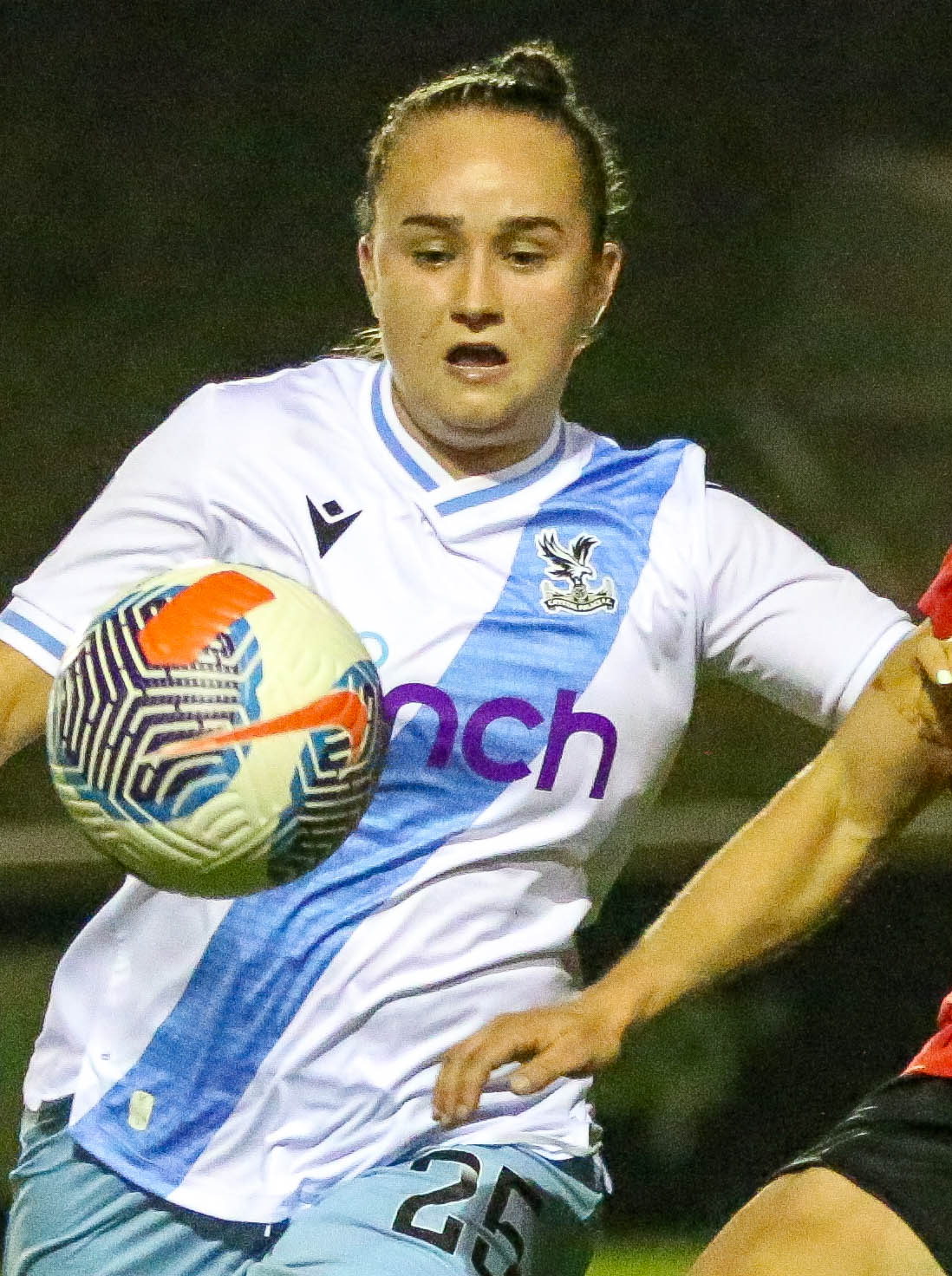
- Watson playing for Crystal Palace in 2023

Personal information
- Full name: Lucy Watson
- Date of birth: 14 November 2003 (age 22)
- Place of birth: Barnsley, England
- Position: Forward

Team information
- Current team: Durham
- Number: 9

Youth career
- 2019-2022: Sheffield United

Senior career*
Years	Team	Apps	(Gls)
2019–2020	Doncaster Rovers Belles	1	(0)
2020–2022	Sheffield United	7	(8)
2022–2025	Chelsea	0	(0)
2022–2023	→ Charlton Athletic (loan)	0	(0)
2023–2024	→ Crystal Palace (loan)	8	(0)
2024–2025	→ Southampton (loan)	0	(0)
2025	→ Ipswich Town (loan)	9	(0)
2025–	Durham	7	(1)

International career^{‡}
2020	England U17	2	(2)
2022	England U19	9	(1)
- * Club domestic league appearances and goals as of 18:30, 2 February 2026 (UTC) ‡ National team caps and goals as of 17:12, 3 November 2024 (UTC)

Lucy Watson (born 14 November 2003) is an English professional footballer who plays as a forward for Women's Super League 2 side Durham.

== Club career ==
Early on in her career, Lucy played for Sheffield United from 2020 to 2022, having played for Doncaster Rovers Belles prior to this. There she made her senior debut at the age of 16. In the 2021–22 Championship season, she scored eight goals in 22 appearances.

Following an impressive season, she signed her first contract for Women's Super League club Chelsea, for the 2022–23 season. From there she was loaned out to Charlton Athletic in August, for the remainder of the season, but the season was cut short due to an ACL injury.

In the 2023–24 season, Watson joined Crystal Palace, helping them to win the Championship, and gain a promotion to the Women's Super League.

For the 2024–25 season, Watson joined Southampton. She was recalled by Chelsea in January 2025 and was instead loaned to Ipswich Town for the remainder of the season, where she made 10 appearances.

On 14 September 2025, Watson signed for Women's Super League 2 side Durham, on a free transfer. On 1 February 2026, she scored the winning goal in Durham's 2–1 win over Portsmouth, scoring from the penalty spot in the 94th minute. She followed the performance up a week later as she scored Durham's equalising goal from 25 yards in the 98th minute in a 1–1 draw with Birmingham City on 8 February 2026.

== International career ==
Watson started her international career in 2022, playing for the England under-17s. Later that year, she was called up to play for the under-19s.

During a match against Czech Republic, Watson helped England to a 4–1 win with a goal, with the help of an assist from Grace Clinton.
