= Molly-Mae Sharpe =

English footballer (born 1998)

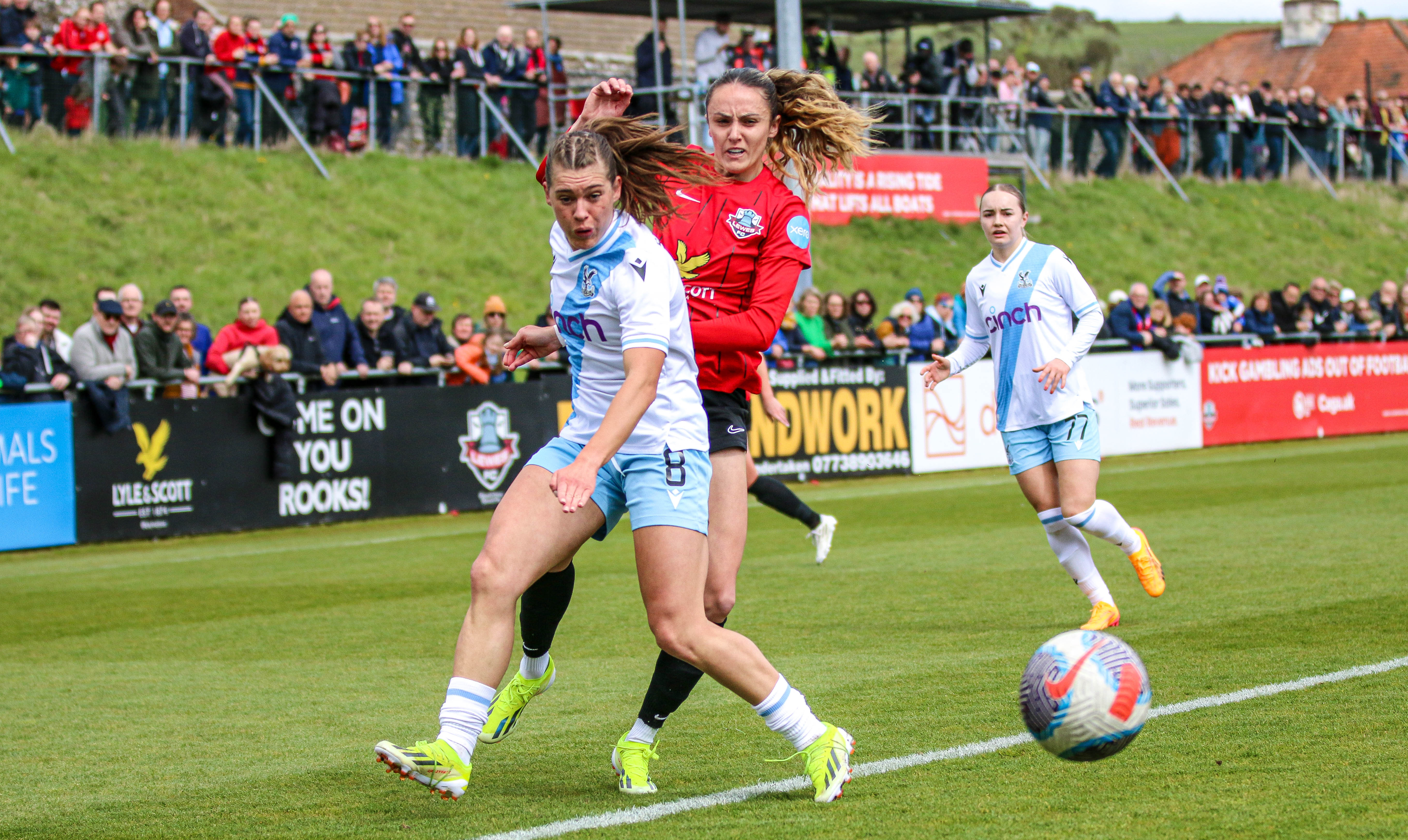
- Molly-Mae Sharpe (number 8) with Crystal Palace in 2024.

Personal information
- Date of birth: 11 March 1998 (age 28)
- Place of birth: Bradford, England
- Height: 5 ft 7 in (1.70 m)
- Positions: Forward; winger

Team information
- Current team: Crystal Palace
- Number: 8

Youth career
- 2006–2007: Leeds United
- 2007–2013: Bradford City

College career
Years	Team	Apps	(Gls)
2015–2019	Barry Buccaneers		

Senior career*
Years	Team	Apps	(Gls)
2013-2015	Bradford City	15	(5)
2019–2021	Durham	33	(10)
2021–	Crystal Palace	105	(26)
- * Club domestic league appearances and goals as of 23:01, 3 November 2024 (UTC)

Molly-Mae Sharpe (born 11 March 1998) is an English professional footballer who plays as forward for Women's Super League club Crystal Palace. She previously played for Durham, NCAA Division II college team Barry Buccaneers in the United States, and Bradford City in the National League.

== Early career ==
=== Youth ===
Sharpe began playing football with her local club Thackley Juniors before joining Leeds United Academy at the age of 9. Age 12 she moved to Bradford City. Originally a midfielder, she made the switch to a forward in her Senior debut aged 16.

In her first year she scored a hat-trick in the final of the West Riding County Cup which saw Bradford City crowned champions over arch rivals Leeds United.

=== College ===
In 2015, Sharpe moved to the United States with a scholarship, attracted to the financial opportunities that the US provided. She studied at Barry University in Miami, Florida, alongside playing football for the Barry Buccaneers college team. She was awarded Offensive Player of the Year in her last year.

== Club career ==
=== Durham ===
On 19 July 2019, Sharpe signed for Durham in the Women’s Championship.

Durham finished second in the league in the Championship season of 2020–21, with Sharpe finishing as the League's joint top scorer.

=== Crystal Palace ===
On 8 August 2021, Sharpe made the move to London, joining for Crystal Palace for the 2021–22 Women's Championship season. Her goal to take the lead against Coventry City in a 3–2 win on 10 October helped Palace gain their first away win in 10 months.

On 27 August 2022, in her first start of the 2022–23 season and third season with Palace, Sharpe scored the opening goal against Coventry City in a 3–0 victory to bring Palace top of the Championship. On 26 March 2023, her goal against Blackburn Rovers, as the only goal of the game, gained Palace their ninth win of the campaign, with the team positioned sixth in the league.

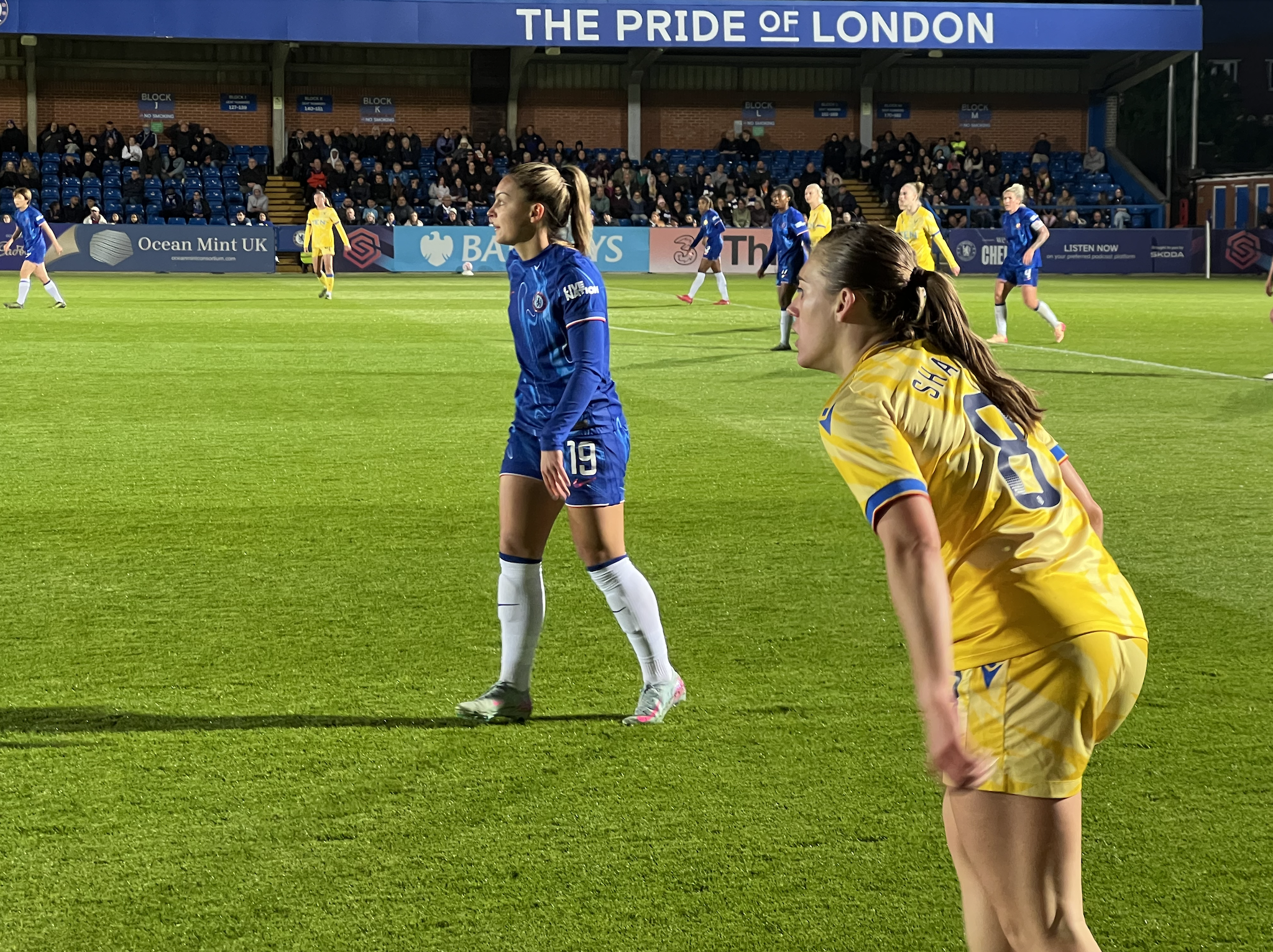
Sharpe with Crystal Palace against Chelsea in April 2025.

For the 2023–24 season, Sharpe was a regular in the Palace side that won promotion to the Women's Super League for the first time in the club's history. She contributed 11 goals and 7 assists to become the third highest goal scorer for the season, and was short-listed for the Championship Player of the Season award.

For March 2024, Sharpe was voted as Palace's Player of the Month after scoring 3 goals, including against Charlton Athletic within 4 minutes in front of a record crowd, and crucially against Sheffield United to bring Palace to second place in the WSL on 14 March. On 4 April, she was among the goalscorers against her former club Durham in a 5–1 victory to bring Palace to the top of the Championship. Two weeks later, her goal against Lewes helped to confirm Lewes' relegation from the Championship, prior to Palace's promotion being confirmed on 28 April.

== Personal life ==
Sharpe grew up supporting Bradford City as a season ticket holder. Having spent four years in Florida gaining a degree in Sport & Exercise Science. she completed a Master's Degree at Durham University, with a scholarship from the football club.

== Honours ==
Crystal Palace

- Women's Championship: 2023–2024

Individual

- Crystal Palace Player of the Month: March 2024
