= Kasia Lipka =

English footballer (born 1993)

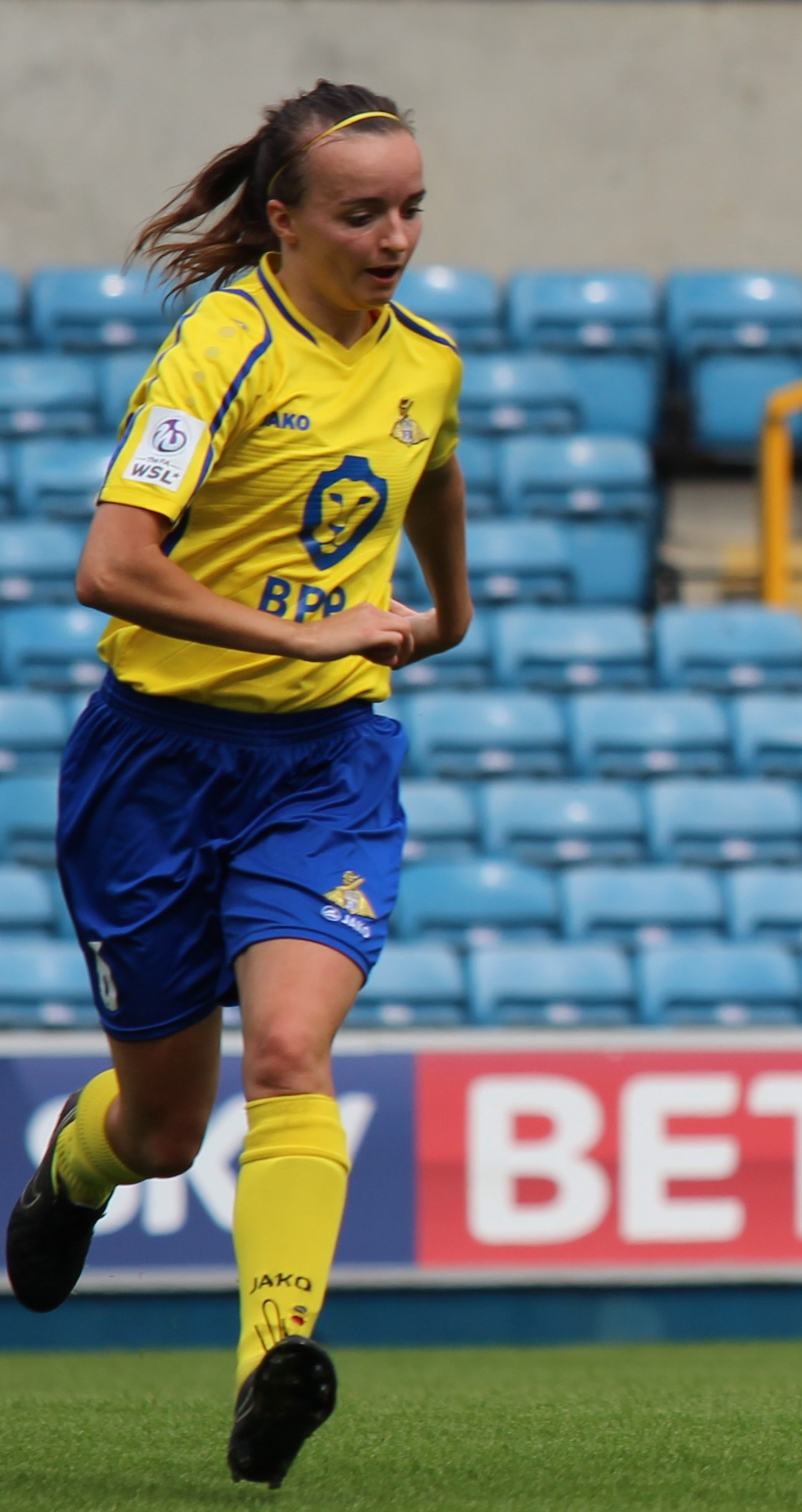
- Kasia Lipka playing for Doncaster Belles in August 2015

Personal information
- Full name: Katarzyna Mary Lipka
- Date of birth: 26 May 1993 (age 33)
- Place of birth: Sheffield, England
- Height: 1.70 m (5 ft 7 in)
- Position: Midfielder

Youth career
- –2009: Sheffield United

Senior career*
Years	Team	Apps	(Gls)
2009–2017	Doncaster Rovers Belles	53	(3)
2017–2018	Sunderland	16	(0)
2019–2022	Sheffield United	38	(0)

International career^{‡}
2008–2009	England U17	3	(1)
2012	England U19	4	(0)
2013–2016	England U23	11	(0)
Medal record
Women's football
Representing Great Britain
Summer Universiade
Gold medal – first place	2013 Kazan	Team
- * Club domestic league appearances and goals as of 16 August 2019 ‡ National team caps and goals as of 16 September 2017

Katarzyna Mary "Kasia" Lipka (born 26 May 1993) is a retired English footballer who played as a midfielder for Sheffield United in the FA Women's Championship.

== Club career ==
After spending a decade of her youth career at Sheffield United, Lipka moved to Doncaster Rovers Belles in 2009 and signed her first professional contract with the club in December 2015.

Lipka went on to sign with FA Women's Super League team Sunderland in September 2017.

Following a season out due to an ACL injury sustained in May 2018, Lipka returned to Sheffield United ahead of the 2019–20 season. She became one of the team's key player, starting in all of Sheffield's league and cup matches throughout the season, and signed a new contract to remain at the club for another year. She retired from football in 2022, having made 47 appearances for Sheffield.

== International career ==
Lipka first played for the England U-19 side in 2012, making four appearances in total. Lipka was part of the gold medal-winning Team GB at the 2013 Summer Universiade held in Kazan, Russia.

== Personal life ==
A native of Sheffield, Lipka is a Sheffield Wednesday supporter. She holds a degree in economics and spent time studying the subject while taking a break from football due to injury.
