= Maddy Cusack =

English footballer (1995–2023)

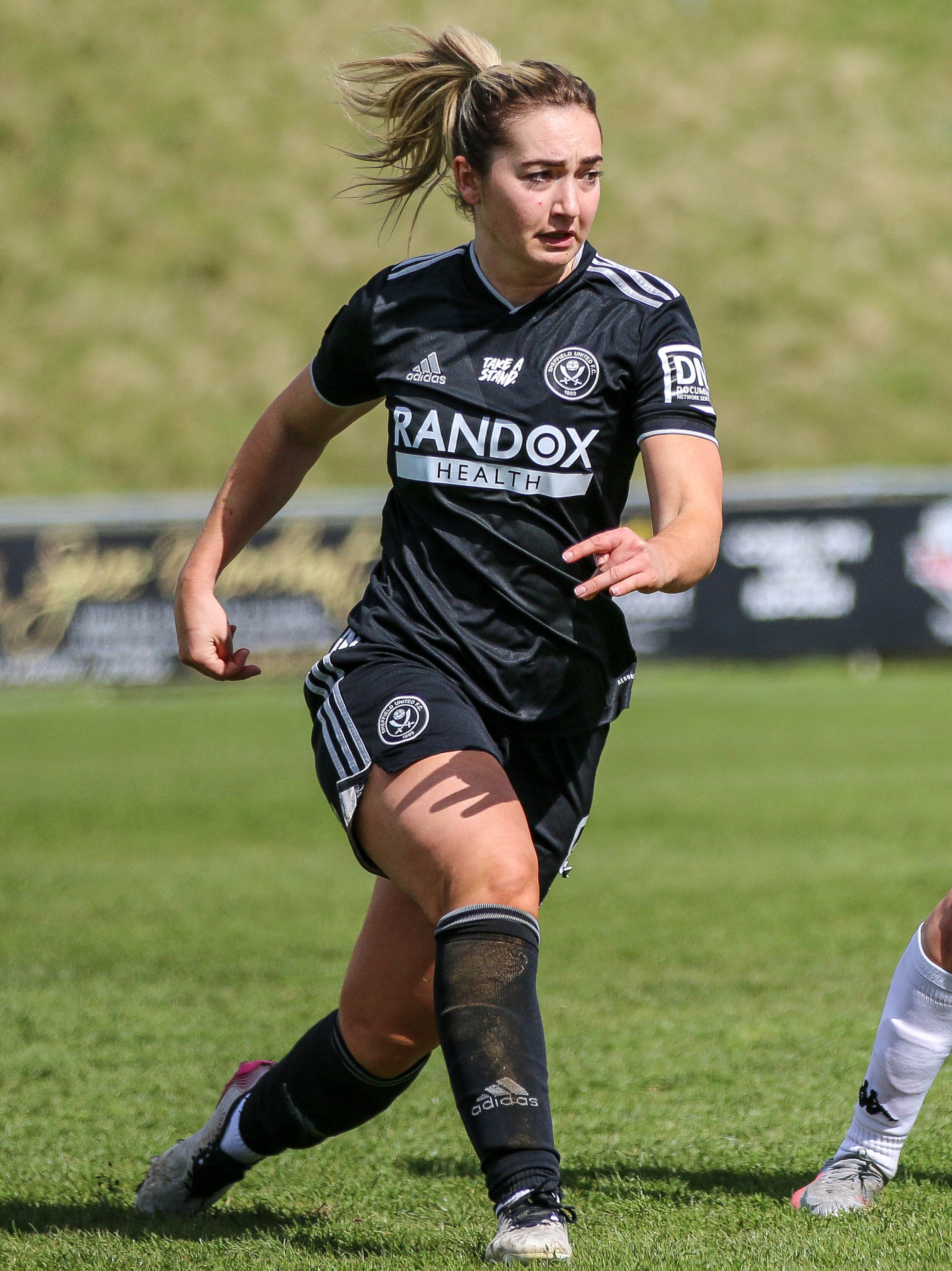
- Cusack in 2022

Personal information
- Birth name: Madeleine Cusack
- Date of birth: 28 October 1995
- Place of birth: Nottingham, England
- Date of death: 20 September 2023 (aged 27)
- Place of death: Horsley, Derbyshire, England
- Position: Midfielder

Youth career
- –2012: Nottingham Forest
- 2012–2014: Aston Villa

Senior career*
Years	Team	Apps	(Gls)
2014–2017	Aston Villa	0	(0)
2017–2018	Birmingham City	0	(0)
2018–2019	Leicester City	7	(0)
2019–2023	Sheffield United	86	(3)
Total		93	(3)

International career
2013–2014	England U19	3	(0)
- * Club domestic league appearances and goals

Madeleine Cusack (28 October 1995 – 20 September 2023) was an English footballer who played as a midfielder. She began her career with local club Nottingham Forest before moving to Aston Villa, where she made her professional debut. She joined Birmingham City in 2017 and spent a year there before moving to Leicester City in 2018. She moved to Sheffield United in January 2019. She played for England U19s at international level. In January 2024, the Football Association opened a formal investigation into her death after reports of wrongdoing by her club manager. The inquest is due to restart on 7 December 2026.

== Education and club career ==
Cusack attended the University of Derby where she achieved a first-class honours degree in marketing, public relations, and advertising. She started playing football at the age of five and started her career at Nottingham Forest academy, before transferring to Aston Villa in 2012, she made her senior debut there in the FA Women's League Cup in 2014.

In 2017, she joined Birmingham City, then played for Leicester City a year later. She moved to Sheffield United in January 2019, under head coach Carla Ward. Eighteen months later, she renewed her contract with the club, and subsequently became the first player to reach 100 appearances for Sheffield United. In 2021, the club's manager, Neil Redfearn, described Cusack as "a great trainer, a real asset of the club and... someone who wants to get better and wants to drive on".

Cusack went on to become a marketing executive at Sheffield United alongside her career as a footballer. She signed a new one-year contract with the club in July 2023. A month later, she was named vice-captain of the club.

== International career ==
Cusack was called up for England U19 during the 2013 UEFA Championship qualifying round, but she was not named in the squad for the final tournament.

A year later, she was selected for the 2014 Championship, where she played in all group stage matches.

== Death ==
Cusack died on 20 September 2023, at the age of 27. At the time of her death, she was the longest-serving player in the Sheffield United women's squad. On 24 September, a minute's silence was held for Cusack before Sheffield United's Premier League game against Newcastle United. Cusack was also shown on the front cover of the matchday programme. Wreaths were laid outside Bramall Lane by supporters and Newcastle co-owner, Amanda Staveley, and on the pitch by Cusack's family, club captain Sophie Brown and former player Tony Currie. The crowd also applauded in the 8th minute, representing Cusack's squad number. A further minute's silence was held at the City Ground on 1 October before the Premier League game between Nottingham Forest and Brentford as Cusack had started her career there in the youth team of Nottingham Forest Women.

Within a week of her death, her family wrote to her club where they outlined a range of issues they stated she had been facing due to a poor relationship with the club's manager, Jonathan Morgan. On 28 November, Sheffield United agreed to an external inquiry into events that led to Cusack's death, with her family claiming her spirit had been "broken" from February 2023 and in the months leading up to her death, despite no previous long-standing mental health issues. On 19 December, it was reported that the inquiry, led by retired detective superintendent Dennis Shotton, found no evidence of wrongdoing at Sheffield United. In January 2024, it was reported that the Football Association had begun gathering evidence ahead of a possible investigation of its own. On 25 January, the FA opened a formal investigation into her death.
