= Leandra Little =

English footballer

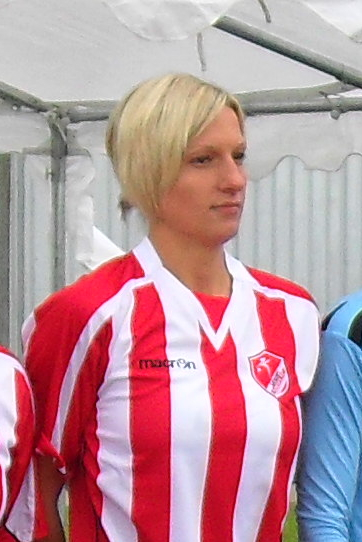
- Leandra Little in September 2010

Personal information
- Full name: Leandra Faye Little
- Date of birth: 8 November 1984 (age 42)
- Place of birth: Torbay, England
- Height: 5 ft 11 in (1.80 m)
- Position: Defender

Youth career
- Torquay Ladies

Senior career*
Years	Team	Apps	(Gls)
2007–2011	Lincoln Ladies		
2012–2018	Doncaster Rovers Belles	59	(6)
2018–2019	Liverpool	11	(0)
2019–2021	Sheffield United	29	(0)
- * Club domestic league appearances and goals as of 14:36, 29 May 2021 (UTC)

Leandra Faye Little (born 8 November 1984) is an English former professional footballer who most recently played as a defender for Sheffield United of the FA Women's Championship. A former PE teacher, she is the education lead at the Liverpool F.C. Women's Academy and an education welfare officer for The Football Association.

== Basketball ==
Prior to her football career, Little represented the England women's national basketball team and played for the City of Sheffield Hatters from 2003 to 2007. Disappointed to be left off the longlist for the Great Britain women's national basketball team at the 2012 London Olympics, Little decided to play football instead.

== Football ==
In 2007 Little joined Lincoln Ladies, becoming an important defender in the team which consistently challenged for promotion from the FA Women's Premier League Northern Division. When Lincoln were accepted into the FA WSL, Little performed well in the inaugural 2011 season, being named Manager's Player of the Year.

In December 2011, Little transferred to Lincoln's FA WSL rivals Doncaster Rovers Belles. In six years with the South Yorkshire outfit, she rose to captain status and grew to love the club: "They hold a dear place in my heart". Although Little helped Doncaster win the 2017–18 FA WSL 2 title, the impecunious fallen giants were refused a WSL license for the following season and consigned to the FA Women's National League.
