= Fran Kitching =

English footballer

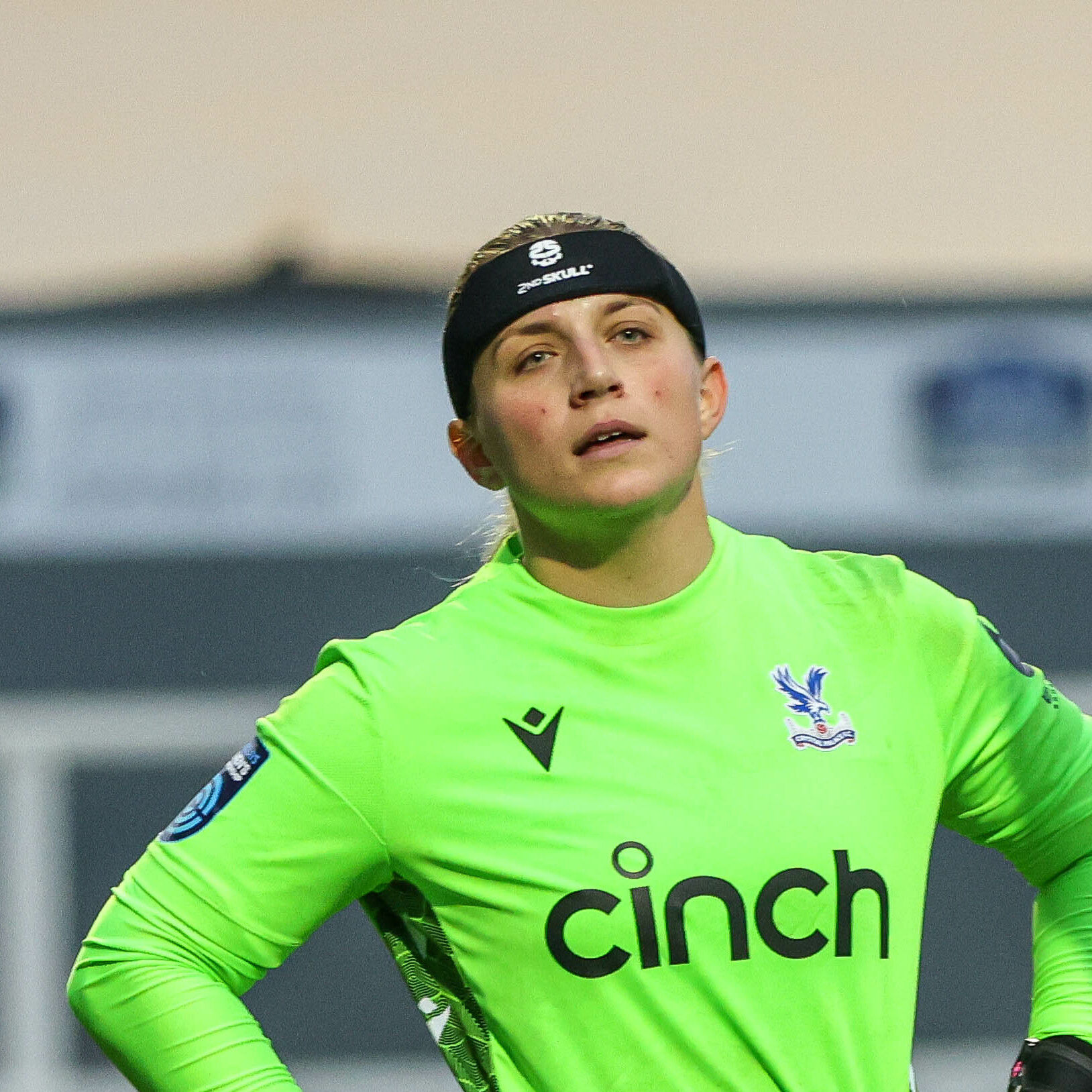
- in 2022 playing for Crystal Palace

Personal information
- Full name: Frances Emily Kitching
- Date of birth: 17 February 1998 (age 28)
- Place of birth: Maltby, Rotherham, England
- Position: Goalkeeper

Youth career
- –2008: Manchester United
- 2008–2015: Sheffield United

Senior career*
Years	Team	Apps	(Gls)
2015–2017	Chelsea	1	(0)
2017–2018	→ Watford (loan)	17	(0)
2018	Sheffield United	0	(0)
2018–2020	Liverpool	10	(0)
2020–2022	Sheffield United	40	(0)
2022–2024	Crystal Palace	21	(0)

International career
2017	England U20		
- * Club domestic league appearances and goals

Frances Emily Kitching (born 17 February 1998) is an English former footballer who played as a goalkeeper. She last played for FA Women's Championship club Crystal Palace, and previously played for Sheffield United, Liverpool, Chelsea, and Watford.

== Career ==
Kitching joined the academy at Sheffield United at the age of 10, with her family being lifelong fans of the club. After graduating from the Sheffield United Regional Talent Club, she joined Chelsea in 2015, becoming the club's third-choice goalkeeper. In 2016, she made her competitive debut against London Bees in the FA Women's Continental League Cup. Kitching made her debut in the WSL on the 30 April 2017 in which Chelsea beat Yeovil Town 6–0.

For the 2017/18 season, Kitching joined Watford on loan. She made her competitive debut for the club in a 3–1 loss to Oxford United on the 2 October. In June 2018, Kitching returned to Sheffield United, however in August 2018, she joined Liverpool.

Kitching returned again to Sheffield United for the 2020–21 FA Women's Championship season.

In October 2024, it was reported that Kitching had retired following the expiration of her Crystal Palace contract at the end of the 2023-24 season and joined the Professional Footballers' Association, supporting the Women's Football and Equality, Diversity and Inclusion teams.

== Honours ==
Individual

- Crystal Palace Women’s Player of the Season: 2022–23
