= 2018–19 Liverpool F.C. Women season =

Liverpool Women
2018–19 season
- Manager: Neil Redfearn (to 14 Sept.); Chris Kirkland (caretaker, from 14 Sept-25 Oct); Vicky Jepson (from 26 Oct)
- Stadium: Prenton Park
- FA WSL: 8th
- FA Cup: Quarter-finals
- FA WSL Cup: Group stage
- Top goalscorer: League: Sweetman-Kirk (10); All: Sweetman-Kirk (13)
Home colours	Away colours	Third colours

The 2018–19 season is Liverpool Football Club Women's 30th season of competitive football and its ninth season in the FA Women's Super League and at the top level of English women's football, being one of the league's foundation clubs. It is also its first season following a re-brand from its former name Liverpool Ladies Football Club. Neil Redfearn began the season as manager, replacing Scott Rogers. Redfearn joined the club after guiding Doncaster Rovers Belles to the crown of FA WSL 2 in the previous season. Redfearn resigned after three months and only one league match in charge, ending his tenure with a 5–0 loss to Arsenal in the league's opening weekend. He was replaced by interim managerial team headed by Chris Kirkland, before Vicky Jepson was named first team manager on a permanent basis. The team finished in 8th place recording a 7-1-12 record in 20 matches.

== First team ==
Last updated on 18 August 2018.

Squad No.	Name	Nationality	Date of birth (age)
Goalkeepers
1	Anke Preuß	(Germany)	22 September 1992 (age 33)
18	Fran Kitching	(England)	17 February 1998 (age 27)
Defenders
2	Jasmine Matthews	(England)	24 March 1993 (age 32)
3	Leighanne Robe	(England)	26 December 1993 (age 32)
4	Rhiannon Roberts	(Wales)	30 August 1990 (age 35)
6	Sophie Bradley-Auckland (vice-captain)	(England)	20 October 1989 (age 36)
12	Leandra Little (captain)	(England)	8 November 1984 (age 41)
44	Satara Murray	(England)	1 July 1993 (age 32)
Midfielders
5	Niamh Fahey	(Republic of Ireland)	13 October 1987 (age 38)
8	Laura Coombs	(England)	29 January 1991 (age 35)
10	Christie Murray	(Scotland)	3 May 1990 (age 35)
19	Amy Rodgers	(England)	4 May 2000 (age 25)
Forwards
7	Jess Clarke	(England)	5 May 1989 (age 36)
9	Courtney Sweetman-Kirk	(England)	16 November 1990 (age 35)
11	Yana Daniëls	(Belgium)	8 May 1992 (age 33)
17	Niamh Charles	(England)	21 June 1999 (age 26)
20	Rinsola Babajide	(England)	17 June 1998 (age 27)
24	Kirsty Linnett	(England)	24 September 1993 (age 32)
36	Ashley Hodson	(England)	5 May 1995 (age 30)

== Transfers and loans ==
=== Transfers in ===
Entry date	Position	No.	Player	From club	Fee	Ref.
26 June 2018	DF	3	(England) Leighanne Robe	(England) Millwall Lionesses	Undisclosed	
3 July 2018	DF	2	(England) Jasmine Matthews	(England) Bristol City	Undisclosed	
4 July 2018	FW	11	(Belgium) Yana Daniëls	(England) Bristol City	Undisclosed	
10 July 2018	GK	1	(Germany) Anke Preuß	(England) Sunderland	Undisclosed	
11 July 2018	DF	12	(England) Leandra Little	(England) Doncaster Rovers Belles	Undisclosed	
12 July 2018	DF	4	(Wales) Rhiannon Roberts	(England) Doncaster Rovers Belles	Undisclosed	
14 July 2018	MF	5	(Republic of Ireland) Niamh Fahey	(France) Bordeaux (fr)	Undisclosed	
14 July 2018	MF	10	(Scotland) Christie Murray	(Scotland) Glasgow City	Undisclosed	
14 July 2018	DF	6	(England) Sophie Bradley-Auckland	(England) Doncaster Rovers Belles	Undisclosed	
14 July 2018	FW	9	(England) Courtney Sweetman-Kirk	(England) Everton	Undisclosed	
10 August 2018	GK	18	(England) Fran Kitching	(England) Sheffield United	Undisclosed	
11 August 2018	FW	24	(England) Kirsty Linnett	(England) Reading	Undisclosed	

=== Transfers out ===
Exit date	Position	No.	Player	To club	Fee	Ref.
18 May 2018	GK	1	(England) Siobhan Chamberlain	(England) Manchester United	Free	
22 May 2018	MF	7	(England) Kate Longhurst	(England) West Ham United	Free	
1 June 2018	MF	10	(Scotland) Caroline Weir	(England) Manchester City	Undisclosed	
11 June 2018	DF	22	(England) Alex Greenwood	(England) Manchester United	Free	
11 June 2018	DF	3	(England) Martha Harris	(England) Manchester United	Free	
11 June 2018	DF	2	(England) Amy Turner	(England) Manchester United	Free	
14 June 2018	MF	6	(Wales) Sophie Ingle	(England) Chelsea	Undisclosed	
15 June 2018	DF	5	(England) Gemma Bonner	(England) Manchester City	Undisclosed	
20 July 2018	MF	18	(England) Ali Johnson	(England) Bristol City	Free	
9 September 2018	GK	23	(Scotland) Becky Flaherty	(England) Everton	Undisclosed	

=== Loans out ===
Start date	End date	Position	No.	Player	To club	Fee	Ref.
10 August 2018	30 June 2019	DF	26	(England) Ellie Fletcher	(England) Sheffield United	Undisclosed	

== Pre-season ==
15 July 2018	Manchester United	Abandoned	Liverpool
		Report

22 July 2018	Everton	0–0	Liverpool
		Report

28 July 2018	Blackburn Rovers	1–3	Liverpool
		Report

1 August 2018	SGS Essen (Germany)	2–1	(England) Liverpool
		Report

5 August 2018	Bayern Munich (Germany)	1–1	(England) Liverpool
		Report

8 August 2018	Leicester City	0–4	Liverpool
		Report

12 August 2018	Durham	0–3	Liverpool
		Report

24 August 2018	Blackburn Rovers	4–1	Liverpool
		Report	Rodgers

== Competitions ==
=== FA Cup ===
10 February 2019 Fourth round	Liverpool	6–0	Milton Keynes Dons	Birkenhead, England
14:00	Coombs 32'; Sweetman-Kirk 34'; Little 60'; Purfield 61', 85'; Hodson 78'	Report		Stadium: Prenton Park

17 February 2019 Fifth round	Liverpool	2–0	Milwall	Birkenhead, England
14:00	Linnett 57'; Babajide 67'	Report		Stadium: Prenton Park

17 March 2019 Quarter-finals	Manchester City	3–0	Liverpool	Manchester, England
15:00	Beckie 25'; Stanway 68', 87'	Report		Stadium: Academy Stadium

=== FA WSL Cup ===
19 August 2018 Group stage	Liverpool	0–1	Manchester United	Birkenhead, England
14:00		Report	83' Arnot	Stadium: Prenton Park

16 September 2018 Group stage	Durham	3–3 (4–5 p)	Liverpool	Durham, England
12:00	Roberts 3', 21'; Cottam 57'	Report	2' Bradley-Auckland; 71' Babajide; 86' Sweetman-Kirk	Stadium: Esh Group Stadium

12 December 2018 Group stage	Reading	1–1 (4–5 p)	Liverpool	High Wycombe, England
19:30	Furness 63'	Report	65' Sweetman-Kirk	Stadium: Adams Park

16 December 2018 Group stage	Liverpool	1–3	Everton	Birkenhead, England
12:00	Fahey 14'	Report	2' Boye-Hlorkah; 10' Magill; 18' Hughes	Stadium: Prenton Park

Pos	Team	Pld	W	WPEN	LPEN	L	GF	GA	GD	Pts	Qualification	MNU	REA	EVE	DUR	LIV
1	Manchester United	4	3	0	0	1	5	2	+3	9	Advance to knock-out stage	—	0–2	—	1–0	—
2	Reading	4	2	0	1	1	9	5	+4	7	Advance to knock-out stage	—	—	—	4–1	1–1
3	Everton	4	2	0	0	2	6	7	−1	6		0–3	3–2	—	—	—
4	Durham	4	1	0	1	2	5	8	−3	4		—	—	1–0	—	3–3
5	Liverpool	4	0	2	0	2	5	8	−3	4		0–1	—	1–3	—	—

Source: thefa.com
Rules for classification: 1) Points; 2) Goal difference; 3) Number of goals scored

== Squad statistics ==
=== Appearances ===
Starting appearances are listed first, followed by substitute appearances after the + symbol where applicable.

No.	Pos	Nat	Player	Total		FA WSL		FA Cup		League Cup	
No.	Pos	Nat	Player	Apps	Goals	Apps	Goals	Apps	Goals	Apps	Goals
1	GK	(Germany) GER	Anke Preuß	17	0	14	0	1	0	2	0
2	DF	(England) ENG	Jasmine Matthews	14	0	10	0	0	0	4	0
3	DF	(England) ENG	Leighanne Robe	20	0	14	0	2	0	4	0
4	MF	(Wales) WAL	Rhiannon Roberts	12	0	6+2	0	2	0	2	0
5	DF	(Republic of Ireland) IRL	Niamh Fahey	23	1	14+3	0	2+1	0	2+1	1
6	DF	(England) ENG	Sophie Bradley-Auckland	28	1	20	0	3	0	4+1	1
7	FW	(England) ENG	Jessica Clarke	16	2	11+1	2	0	0	3+1	0
8	MF	(England) ENG	Laura Coombs	27	0	20	0	3	0	4	0
9	FW	(England) ENG	Courtney Sweetman-Kirk	26	13	15+4	10	3	1	2+2	2
10	MF	(Scotland) SCO	Christie Murray	26	0	16+3	0	3	0	3+1	0
11	MF	(Belgium) BEL	Yana Daniëls	20	1	9+6	1	1	0	2+2	0
12	MF	(England) ENG	Leandra Little	15	1	5+6	0	1+1	1	1+1	0
17	DF	(England) ENG	Niamh Charles	10	1	7+2	1	0	0	1	0
18	GK	(England) ENG	Fran Kitching	10	0	6	0	2	0	2	0
19	MF	(England) ENG	Amy Rodgers	18	1	9+3	1	2+1	0	2+1	0
20	FW	(England) ENG	Rinsola Babajide	21	6	10+7	4	2+1	1	1	1
21	MF	(England) ENG	Missy Bo Kearns	3	0	0+3	0	0	0	0	0
22	DF	(England) ENG	Simran Jhamat	2	0	0+2	0	0	0	0	0
23	DF	(England) ENG	Jemma Purfield	11	2	6	0	3	2	2	0
24	FW	(England) ENG	Kirsty Linnett	19	3	9+6	2	1	1	2+1	0
27	FW	(Northern Ireland) NIR	Annabel Blanchard	1	0	0+1	0	0	0	0	0
29	FW	(England) ENG	Lauren Thomas	3	0	0+2	0	0+1	0	0	0
36	FW	(England) ENG	Ashley Hodson	9	2	0+6	1	0+3	1	0	0
44	DF	(England) ENG	Satara Murray	18	0	12+2	0	1	0	3	0

=== Goalscorers ===
Rank	No.	Pos.	Name	FA WSL	FA Cup	League Cup	Total
1	9	FW	(England) Courtney Sweetman-Kirk	10	1	2	13
2	20	FW	(England) Rinsola Babajide	4	1	1	6
3	24	FW	(England) Kirsty Linnett	2	1	0	3
4	7	FW	(England) Jessica Clarke	2	0	0	2
4	23	DF	(England) Jemma Purfield	0	2	0	2
4	36	FW	(England) Ashley Hodson	1	1	0	2
6	5	DF	(Republic of Ireland) Niamh Fahey	0	0	1	1
6	6	DF	(England) Sophie Bradley-Auckland	0	0	1	1
6	11	FW	(Belgium) Yana Daniëls	1	0	0	1
6	12	FW	(England) Leandra Little	0	1	0	1
6	17	FW	(England) Niamh Charles	1	0	0	1
6	19	MF	(England) Amy Rodgers	1	0	0	1
Total				22	7	5	34
