= 2017–18 Liverpool L.F.C. season =

Liverpool Ladies FC
2017–18 season
- Manager: Scott Rogers
- Stadium: Select Security Stadium
- FA WSL 1: 6th
- FA Cup: Quarter-final
- FA WSL Cup: Quarter-final
- Top goalscorer: League: Bethany England and Natasha Harding (4); All: Bethany England (5)
Home colours	Away colours	Third colours

The 2017–18 season is Liverpool Ladies Football Club's 29th season of competitive football and its eighth season in the FA Women's Super League and at the top level of English women's football, being one of the league's foundation clubs.

Following a reorganisation of top-level women's football in England, the 2017–18 season was the first after the FA WSL shifted its calendar to match the traditional autumn-to-spring axis of football in Europe.

== First team ==
Last updated on 19 February 2018

Squad No.	Name	Nationality	Date of birth (age)
Goalkeepers
1	Siobhan Chamberlain	(England)	15 August 1983 (age 42)
12	Emily Ramsey	(England)	16 November 2000 (age 25)
23	Becky Flaherty	(Scotland)	6 March 1998 (age 27)
Defenders
2	Amy Turner	(England)	4 July 1991 (age 34)
3	Martha Harris	(England)	19 August 1994 (age 31)
5	Gemma Bonner (captain)	(England)	13 July 1991 (age 34)
21	Naomi Hartley	(England)	12 January 2001 (age 25)
22	Alex Greenwood	(England)	7 September 1993 (age 32)
26	Ellie Fletcher	(England)	16 June 1999 (age 26)
40	Lucy Roberts	(England)	11 May 2001 (age 24)
44	Satara Murray	(England)	1 July 1993 (age 32)
Midfielders
6	Sophie Ingle	(Wales)	2 September 1991 (age 34)
7	Kate Longhurst	(England)	2 May 1989 (age 36)
8	Laura Coombs	(England)	29 January 1991 (age 35)
10	Caroline Weir	(Scotland)	20 June 1995 (age 30)
11	Bethany England	(England)	3 June 1994 (age 31)
18	Ali Johnson	(England)	24 December 1998 (age 27)
19	Amy Rodgers	(England)	4 May 2000 (age 25)
36	Ashley Hodson	(England)	5 May 1995 (age 30)
Forwards
9	Jess Clarke	(England)	5 May 1989 (age 36)
15	Cassia Pike	(Wales)	27 December 2000 (age 25)
17	Niamh Charles	(England)	21 June 1999 (age 26)
20	Rinsola Babajide	(England)	17 June 1998 (age 27)

== New contracts ==
No.	Pos	Player	Date	Source
17	FW	(England) Niamh Charles	29 June 2017	
6	MF	(Wales) Sophie Ingle	21 September 2017	
18	MF	(England) Ali Johnson	23 November 2017	
23	GK	(Scotland) Becky Flaherty	23 November 2017	
26	DF	(England) Ellie Fletcher	23 November 2017	
36	MF	(England) Ashley Hodson	23 November 2017	

== Transfers and loans ==
=== Transfers in ===
Entry date	Position	No.	Player	From club	Fee	Ref.
25 January 2018	FW	20	(England) Rinsola Babajide	(England) Watford	Undisclosed	

=== Transfers out ===
Exit date	Position	No.	Player	To club	Fee	Ref.
11 July 2017	GK	12	(England) Danielle Gibbons	(England) Sheffield	Released	
12 August 2017	MF	20	(England) Katie Zelem	(Italy) Juventus	Undisclosed	
29 August 2017	FW	11	(Netherlands) Shanice van de Sanden	(France) Lyon	Undisclosed	
30 December 2017	FW	40	(Wales) Natasha Harding	(England) Reading	Free	
19 February 2018	DF	4	(England) Casey Stoney		Retired	

=== Loans in ===
Start date	End date	Position	No.	Player	From club	Fee	Ref.
14 September 2017	30 June 2018	MF	11	Bethany England	(England) Chelsea	Undisclosed	

=== Loans out ===
Start date	End date	Position	No.	Player	To club	Fee	Ref.
9 January 2017	31 May 2018	MF	30	(England) Hannah Dale	(England) Sheffield	Undisclosed	

== Pre-season ==
13 August 2017	Fylde	0 – 8	Liverpool	Warton, Fylde
14:00		Report	Hodson 12'; Clarke 18', 26'; Weir 35', 45+1'; Jhamat 67' (pen.); Pike 77' (pen.); Everett 82'	Stadium: Kellamergh Park

20 August 2017	Liverpool	6 – 0	Watford	Kirkby
15:00	Harding; Hodson; Rodgers; Blanchard	Report		Stadium: The Academy

3 September 2017	Aston Villa	Cancelled	Liverpool	Tamworth, Staffordshire
TBD		Report		Stadium: The Lamb Ground

9 September 2017	Bristol City	2 – 0	Liverpool	Filton
17:00		Report		Stadium: Stoke Gifford Stadium

=== Toulouse International Ladies Cup ===
25 August 2017	Liverpool (England)	0 – 6	(France) Lyon	Toulouse, France
17:30		Report	Hegerberg 9', 23'; Le Sommer 49', 60'; Malard 73'; Marozsán 87'	Stadium: Stade Ernest-Wallon

27 August 2017	Liverpool (England)	0 – 3	(France) Montpellier	Toulouse, France
11:00		Report	Léger 3', 73'; Haupais 35'	Stadium: Stade Ernest-Wallon

== Competitions ==
=== Women's Super League ===
==== Results summary ====
Overall								Home						Away					
Pld	W	D	L	GF	GA	GD	Pts	W	D	L	GF	GA	GD	W	D	L	GF	GA	GD
15	8	1	6	27	21	+6	25	4	1	2	15	8	+7	4	0	4	12	13	−1

Last updated: 29 April 2018.
Source: FA WSL

==== Results by matchday ====
Matchday	1	2	3	4	5	6	7	8	9	10	11	12	13	14	15	16	17	18
Ground	A	H	A	A	H	H	H	H	A	H	A	A	A	A	H	H	A	H
Result	W	L	L	W	W	W	W	L	L	W	L	W	W	L	D	W	L	L
Position	1	6	6	4	3	3	3	3	4	3	6	6	6	6	6	6	6	6

Updated to match(es) played on 29 April 2018. Source: FA WSL
A = Away; H = Home; W = Win; D = Draw; L = Loss

==== Matches ====
22 September 2017 1	Everton	0 – 2	Liverpool	Widnes
19:45	Finnigan (yellow card) 28'	Report	Harding 69'; Weir (yellow card) 90'; Charles 90+3'	Stadium: Select Security Stadium; Attendance: 1,439; Referee: Sarah Garrett

29 September 2017 2	Liverpool	0 – 3	Reading	Widnes
19:00		Report	Williams 19'; Allen 33'; Chaplen 74'	Stadium: Select Security Stadium; Attendance: 481; Referee: Joe Hull

7 October 2017 3	Chelsea	1 – 0	Liverpool	Kingston upon Thames
12:30	Mjelde 14'; Davison (yellow card) 44'	Report		Stadium: Kingsmeadow; Attendance: 2,116; Referee: Amy Fearn

28 October 2017 4	Sunderland	1 – 4	Liverpool	South Shields
18:00	Staniforth 11'; Williams (yellow card) 81'	Report	Harding 12', 60', 85'; Greenwood 57' (yellow card) 64'	Stadium: Mariners Park; Attendance: 429; Referee: John Matthews

11 November 2017 5	Liverpool	1 – 0	Birmingham City	Widnes
17:30	Charles 30'; Longhurst (yellow card) 78'	Report	Ayisi (yellow card) 81'	Stadium: Select Security Stadium; Attendance: 843; Referee: David McNamara

10 December 2017	Arsenal	Postponed	Liverpool
		Report

6 January 2018 6	Liverpool	8 – 0	Yeovil Town	Widnes
17:30	Heatherson 17' (o.g.); England 30', 39', 55', 60'; Weir 51'; Clarke 59'; Coombs 75'	Report		Stadium: Select Security Stadium; Attendance: 453; Referee: Helen Byrne

27 January 2018 7	Liverpool	2 – 0	Bristol City	Widnes
17:30	England 46', 65'	Report		Stadium: Select Security Stadium; Attendance: 461; Referee: Amy Fearn

7 February 2018 8	Liverpool	0 – 3	Arsenal	Widnes
19:00		Report	Miedema 29' (pen.); Janssen 45'; Evans 62'	Stadium: Select Security Stadium; Attendance: 461; Referee: R. Welch

11 February 2018 9	Manchester City	4 – 0	Liverpool	Manchester
12:30	Parris 2', 60'; Christiansen 56' (pen.); McManus 73'	Report		Stadium: Academy Stadium; Attendance: 2,356; Referee: Scott Simpson

21 February 2018 10	Liverpool	3 – 1	Sunderland	Widnes
19:00	Clarke 18', 50'; England 55'; Harris (yellow card) 58'	Report	Bruinenberg 32'	Stadium: Select Security Stadium; Attendance: 497; Referee: Sarah Garratt

25 March 2018 11	Birmingham City	4 – 0	Liverpool	Solihull
		Report		Stadium: Damson Park

=== FA Cup ===
4 February 2018 Fourth round	Liverpool	5 – 0	Watford	Walton, Liverpool
13:00	Johnson 7'; Weir 19'; England 22', 63'; Harris 29'	Report		Stadium: Walton Hall Park

18 February 2018 Fifth round	Chichester City	0 – 3	Liverpool	Chichester
14:00		Report	Babajide 34'; Hodson 39'; England 47'	Stadium: Oaklands Park

18 March 2018 Quarter-final	Liverpool	0 – 3	Chelsea	Widnes
14:00		Report	Andersson 21'; Chapman 45'; Mjelde 58' (pen)	Stadium: Select Security Stadium

=== FA WSL Cup ===
==== Group stage ====
11 October 2017 Group 1 North	Liverpool	6 – 0	Sheffield	Widnes
19:00	Weir 10', 29'; Gilliatt 52' (o.g.); Ingle 65'; Johnson 83'; England 90'	Report		Stadium: Select Security Stadium; Attendance: 352; Referee: Simon Mather

5 November 2017 Group 1 North	Durham	0 – 0 (4 – 5 p)	Liverpool	Durham
12:00	Johnson (yellow card) 54'; Lee (yellow card) 60'; Christon (yellow card) 73'	Report		Stadium: New Ferens Park; Attendance: 351; Referee: Helen Byrne
	Penalties
	Hill (penalty scored); Wilson (penalty scored); Hepple (penalty missed); Worthington (penalty scored); Johnson (penalty missed); Atkinson (penalty scored); Christon (penalty missed); Gears (penalty missed)		(penalty missed) Greenwood; (penalty scored) Coombs; (penalty missed) Bonner; (penalty scored) England; (penalty scored) Harding; (penalty scored) Stoney; (penalty missed) Charles; (penalty scored) Weir

15 November 2017 Group 1 North	Liverpool	5 – 1	Aston Villa	Widnes
19:00	Hodson 17'; Clarke 38'; Greenwood 49' (pen.); Weir 85'; Johnson 87'	Report	Jones 67'	Stadium: Select Security Stadium; Attendance: 282; Referee: Natalie Aspinall

5 December 2017 Group 1 North	Sunderland	1 – 0	Liverpool	South Shields
18:00	Galloway 13'	Report	Greenwood (yellow card) 80'	Stadium: Mariners Park; Attendance: 128; Referee: Matthew Dicicco

==== Knock-out rounds ====
17 December 2017 Quarter-final	Chelsea	5 – 1	Liverpool	Kingston upon Thames
14:00	Bachmann 23'; Kirby 4', 24', 62'; Cuthbert 77'	Report	Stoney 51'	Stadium: Kingsmeadow; Attendance: 1,161; Referee: Alex Burke

== Appearances and goals ==
As of 22 February 2018

Players without any appearance are not included.

No.	Pos	Nat	Player	Total		FA WSL		FA Cup		FA WSL Cup	
No.	Pos	Nat	Player	Apps	Goals	Apps	Goals	Apps	Goals	Apps	Goals
Goalkeepers:
1	GK	(England) ENG	Siobhan Chamberlain	11	0	7	0	0	0	4	0
12	GK	(England) ENG	Emily Ramsey	1	0	0	0	1	0	0	0
23	GK	(Scotland) SCO	Becky Flaherty	5	0	3	0	1	0	1	0
Defenders:
2	DF	(England) ENG	Amy Turner	5	0	2+2	0	1	0	0	0
3	DF	(England) ENG	Martha Harris	12	1	6+2	0	1	1	1+2	0
5	DF	(England) ENG	Gemma Bonner	12	0	7	0	0	0	5	0
21	DF	(England) ENG	Naomi Hartley	1	0	0	0	1	0	0	0
22	DF	(England) ENG	Alex Greenwood	16	2	10	1	1	0	5	1
26	DF	(England) ENG	Ellie Fletcher	3	0	0	0	0	0	3	0
40	DF	(England) ENG	Lucy Roberts	2	0	0+1	0	1	0	0	0
44	DF	(England) ENG	Satara Murray	9	0	5+1	0	1	0	2	0
Midfielders:
6	MF	(Wales) WAL	Sophie Ingle	17	1	10	0	2	0	5	1
7	MF	(England) ENG	Kate Longhurst	11	0	4+2	0	2	0	2+1	0
8	MF	(England) ENG	Laura Coombs	14	1	9	1	0	0	5	0
10	MF	(Scotland) SCO	Caroline Weir	16	5	8+1	1	2	1	5	3
11	MF	(England) ENG	Bethany England	14	9	9	5	2	3	2+1	1
18	MF	(England) ENG	Ali Johnson	11	3	3+3	0	2	1	0+3	2
19	MF	(England) ENG	Amy Rodgers	2	0	0	0	1+1	0	0	0
36	MF	(England) ENG	Ashley Hodson	14	2	1+6	0	2	1	5	1
Forwards:
9	FW	(England) ENG	Jess Clarke	16	4	8+1	3	0+2	0	3+2	1
15	FW	(Wales) WAL	Cassia Pike	4	0	0+1	0	0+2	0	0+1	0
17	FW	(England) ENG	Niamh Charles	8	2	4+1	2	0	0	3	0
20	FW	(England) ENG	Rinsola Babajide	4	1	0+3	0	1	1	0	0
Players who left the club during the season:
4	DF	(England) ENG	Casey Stoney	12	1	9	0	0	0	3	1
40	FW	(Wales) WAL	Natasha Harding	8	4	5	4	0	0	1+2	0

== Honours ==
- FA WSL 1 Player of the Month: Bethany England, January 2018.
