= 2017 Liverpool L.F.C. season =

Liverpool Ladies FC
2017 season
- Manager: Scott Rogers
- Stadium: Select Security Stadium
- FA WSL 1: 4th
- FA Women's Cup: Semi-finals
- Top goalscorer: League: Caroline Weir (5); All: Natasha Harding (6); Caroline Weir (6)
Home colours	Away colours	Third colours

The 2017 season is Liverpool Ladies Football Club's 28th season of competitive football and its seventh season in the FA Women's Super League and at the top level of English women's football, being one of the league's foundation clubs.

Following a reorganisation of top-level women's football in England, the 2017 season will only cover half of a traditional season's length, while the FA WSL shifts its calendar to match the traditional autumn-to-spring axis of football in Europe. For the same reason, there is no Champions League qualification nor relegation to be competed for.

On 19 April 2017, Liverpool Ladies FC announced a landmark shirt sponsorship deal with beauty and cosmetics company Avon Products. This three-year agreement will see Avon become the first independent shirt sponsor for the club, replacing Standard Chartered from the men's side. As part of the agreement, Avon will also become Liverpool Ladies FC's principal partner and ladies beauty partner.

== First team ==
Last updated on 18 May 2017

Squad No.	Name	Nationality	Date of birth (age)
Goalkeepers
1	Siobhan Chamberlain	(England)	15 August 1983 (age 42)
12	Danielle Gibbons	(England)	31 July 1992 (age 33)
23	Rebecca Flaherty	(Scotland)	6 March 1998 (age 27)
Defenders
2	Amy Turner	(England)	4 July 1991 (age 34)
3	Martha Harris	(England)	19 August 1994 (age 31)
4	Casey Stoney	(England)	13 May 1982 (age 43)
5	Gemma Bonner (captain)	(England)	13 July 1991 (age 34)
22	Alex Greenwood	(England)	7 September 1993 (age 32)
26	Ellie Fletcher	(England)	16 June 1999 (age 26)
44	Satara Murray	(England)	1 July 1993 (age 32)
Midfielders
6	Sophie Ingle	(Wales)	2 September 1991 (age 34)
7	Kate Longhurst	(England)	2 May 1989 (age 36)
8	Laura Coombs	(England)	29 January 1991 (age 35)
10	Caroline Weir	(Scotland)	20 June 1995 (age 30)
18	Ali Johnson	(England)	24 December 1998 (age 27)
19	Amy Rodgers	(England)	4 May 2000 (age 25)
20	Katie Zelem	(England)	20 January 1996 (age 30)
40	Natasha Harding	(Wales)	2 March 1989 (age 36)
Forwards
9	Jess Clarke	(England)	5 May 1989 (age 36)
11	Shanice van de Sanden	(Netherlands)	2 October 1992 (age 33)
17	Niamh Charles	(England)	21 June 1999 (age 26)
36	Ashley Hodson	(England)	5 May 1995 (age 30)

== New contracts ==
No.	Pos	Player	Date	Source
12	GK	(England) Danielle Gibbons	15 February 2017	
44	DF	(England) Satara Murray	16 February 2017	
3	DF	(England) Martha Harris	17 February 2017	

== Transfers and loans ==
=== Transfers in ===
Entry date	Position	No.	Player	From club	Fee	Ref.
13 December 2016	DF	4	(England) Casey Stoney	(England) Arsenal	Free	
11 April 2017	FW	9	(England) Jess Clarke	(England) Notts County	Undisclosed	
11 April 2017	MF	8	(England) Laura Coombs	(England) Chelsea	Undisclosed	
16 May 2017	DF	2	(England) Amy Turner	(England) Notts County	Free	

=== Transfers out ===
Exit date	Position	No.	Player	To club	Fee	Ref.
9 November 2016	FW	23	(New Zealand) Rosie White	(United States) Boston Breakers	Undisclosed	
14 November 2016	DF	4	(Netherlands) Mandy van den Berg	(England) Reading	Free	
14 November 2016	FW	9	(Sweden) Emma Lundh	(Sweden) Vittsjö GIK	Free	
1 January 2017	DF	33	(England) Maz Pacheco	(England) Doncaster Belles	Undisclosed	
28 March 2017	FW	21	(England) Mollie Green	(England) Everton	Undisclosed	

=== Loans out ===
Start date	End date	Position	No.	Player	To club	Fee	Ref.
9 January 2017	31 May 2018	MF	30	(England) Hannah Dale	(England) Sheffield	Undisclosed	

== Pre-season ==
13 February 2017 Friendly	Liverpool (England)	3 – 0	(Scotland) Hibernian	Widnes
	Weir; Harding	Report		Stadium: Select Security Stadium

23 February 2017 Friendly	Liverpool (England)	5 – 2	(England) Sheffield	Kirkby
	Green van de Sanden; Bonner; Harris	Report	Making	Stadium: Liverpool F.C. Academy

== Competitions ==
=== Women's Super League ===
==== Results summary ====
Overall								Home						Away					
Pld	W	D	L	GF	GA	GD	Pts	W	D	L	GF	GA	GD	W	D	L	GF	GA	GD
8	4	2	2	20	18	+2	14	2	0	1	9	5	+4	2	2	1	11	13	−2

Last updated: 4 June 2017.
Source: FA WSL

==== Results by matchday ====
Matchday	1	2	3	4	5	6	7	8
Ground	A	H	A	A	H	A	A	H
Result	W	W	D	W	W	D	L	L
Position	1	1	1	1	1	1	1	4

Updated to match(es) played on 4 June 2017. Source: FA WSL
A = Away; H = Home; W = Win; D = Draw; L = Loss

==== Matches ====
23 April 2017 1	Yeovil Town	1 – 4	Liverpool	Yeovil
14:00	Curson (yellow card) 67'; Wiltshire 78' (pen.)	Report	van de Sanden (yellow card) 18'; Greenwood 23' (pen.); Longhurst (yellow card) 44'; Bonner 45'; Zelem 65', 75'	Stadium: Huish Park; Attendance: 1,897; Referee: Richard Hulme

28 April 2017 2	Liverpool	4 – 2	Reading	Widnes
19:00	Harding 2', 25'; Weir 34'; Coombs 50'	Report	Chaplen 4'; Fletcher 8'; Furness (yellow card) 38'	Stadium: Select Security Stadium; Attendance: 466; Referee: Matthew Donohue

4 May 2017 3	Arsenal	4 – 4	Liverpool	Canons Park
19:30	Kelly 36'; Carter 54', 59'; Nobbs 80'	Report	Greenwood 13'; Harding 43'; Weir 44'; Bonner 83'	Stadium: The Hive; Attendance: 696; Referee: David Rock

7 May 2017 4	Birmingham City	0 – 2	Liverpool	Birmingham
14:00		Report	Clarke 49'; Bonner 81'	Stadium: St. Andrews Stadium; Attendance: 1,110; Referee: Robert Dadley

17 May 2017 5	Liverpool	4 – 0	Sunderland	Widnes
19:00	Weir 9', 58'; Harding 22'; Stoney 81'	Report		Stadium: Select Security Stadium; Attendance: 441; Referee: Martin Woods

20 May 2017 6	Bristol City	1 – 1	Liverpool	Filton
18:00	Agg 85'	Report	Longhurst (yellow card) 74' (yellow-red card) 88'; Zelem 80'	Stadium: Stoke Gifford Stadium; Attendance: 1,142; Referee: Adam Ricketts

28 May 2017 7	Chelsea	7 – 0	Liverpool	Staines-upon-Thames
12:05	Flaherty 3'; Kirby 43'; Ji 45'; Mjelde 49'; Carney 66'; Cuthbert 79'; Spence 83'	Report	Coombs (yellow card) 86'	Stadium: Staines Town F.C. Attendance: 1,654; Referee: Jacob Miles

3 June 2017 8	Liverpool	1 – 3	Manchester City	Widnes
	Weir 90'	Report	Scott 29'; Lawley 45'; Campbell 61'	Stadium: Select Security Stadium; Attendance: 1,508; Referee: Peter Gibbons

=== FA Cup ===
19 March 2017 Fifth round	Liverpool	2 – 1 (a.e.t.)	Everton	Widnes
14:00	Harding 8' van de Sanden 108'	Report	Magill 69'	Stadium: Select Security Stadium; Attendance: 728

26 March 2017 Sixth round	Liverpool	2 – 0	Notts County	Widnes
14:00	Weir 3' (yellow card) 25'; Harding 18'	Report		Stadium: Select Security Stadium; Attendance: 302; Referee: Simon Mather

17 April 2017 Semi-final	Manchester City	1 – 0	Liverpool	Manchester
14:00	Lawley 58'	Report		Stadium: Academy Stadium; Attendance: 3,059; Referee: Sarah Garratt

== Statistics ==
=== Appearances and goals ===
As of 4 June 2017

Players without any appearance are not included.

No.	Pos	Nat	Player	Total		FA WSL		FA Cup	
No.	Pos	Nat	Player	Apps	Goals	Apps	Goals	Apps	Goals
Goalkeepers:
1	GK	(England) ENG	Siobhan Chamberlain	11	0	8	0	3	0
Defenders:
4	DF	(England) ENG	Casey Stoney	7	1	5	1	2	0
5	DF	(England) ENG	Gemma Bonner	11	3	8	3	3	0
22	DF	(England) ENG	Alex Greenwood	9	2	6	2	3	0
26	DF	(England) ENG	Ellie Fletcher	2	0	1+1	0	0	0
Midfielders:
6	MF	(Wales) WAL	Sophie Ingle	11	0	8	0	3	0
7	MF	(England) ENG	Kate Longhurst	10	0	1+6	0	3	0
8	MF	(England) ENG	Laura Coombs	8	1	8	1	0	0
10	MF	(Scotland) SCO	Caroline Weir	11	6	8	5	2+1	1
18	MF	(England) ENG	Ali Johnson	8	0	0+5	0	2+1	0
19	MF	(England) ENG	Amy Rodgers	2	0	0+2	0	0	0
20	MF	(England) ENG	Katie Zelem	10	3	2+5	3	2+1	0
40	MF	(Wales) WAL	Natasha Harding	11	6	8	4	3	2
Forwards:
9	FW	(England) ENG	Jess Clarke	7	1	4+3	1	0	0
11	FW	(Netherlands) NED	Shanice van de Sanden	10	1	6+1	0	3	1
17	FW	(England) ENG	Niamh Charles	8	0	7	0	1	0
36	FW	(England) ENG	Ashley Hodson	11	0	8	0	3	0
Players who left the club during the season:
21	FW	(England) ENG	Mollie Green	1	0	0	0	0+1	0

=== Goalscorers ===
Includes all competitive matches. The list is sorted by squad number when total goals are equal.

As of 4 June 2017

Rank	Pos.	No.	Player	FA WSL	FA Cup	Total
1	MF	10	(Scotland) Caroline Weir	5	1	6
1	MF	40	(Wales) Natasha Harding	4	2	6
3	DF	5	(England) Gemma Bonner	3	0	3
3	MF	20	(England) Katie Zelem	3	0	3
5	DF	22	(England) Alex Greenwood	2	0	2
6	DF	4	(England) Casey Stoney	1	0	1
6	MF	8	(England) Laura Coombs	1	0	1
6	FW	9	(England) Jess Clarke	1	0	1
6	FW	11	(Netherlands) Shanice van de Sanden	0	1	1
Total				20	4	24

=== Clean sheets ===
Includes all competitive matches. The list is sorted by squad number when total clean sheets are equal.

As of 4 June 2017

Rank	Pos.	No.	Player	FA WSL	FA Cup	Total
1	GK	1	(England) Siobhan Chamberlain	2	1	3
Total				2	1	3

== Honours ==
- 2016–17 PFA Players' Player of the Year: (Scotland) Caroline Weir (finalist)
- 2016–17 PFA Young Player of the Year: (Scotland) Caroline Weir (finalist)
- 2016–17 PFA Team of the Year: (Scotland) Caroline Weir
