= 2019–20 Liverpool F.C. Women season =

Liverpool
2019–20 season
- Head Coach: Vicky Jepson
- Stadium: Prenton Park, Birkenhead
- FA WSL: 12th (relegated)
- FA Cup: Fifth round
- League Cup: Group stage
- Top goalscorer: League: Rachel Furness (4); All: Rinsola Babajide (8)
- Highest home attendance: 23,500 (vs. Everton, 17 November)
- Lowest home attendance: League: 540 (vs. Chelsea, 15 December); All: 215 (vs. Durham, 11 December, League Cup)
- Average home league attendance: 4,604 as of 13 February 2020
Home colours	Away colours	Third colours

The 2019–20 Liverpool F.C. Women season was the club's 31st season of competitive football and its 10th season in the FA Women's Super League, the highest level of the football pyramid, having been one of the league's foundation clubs. Along with competing in the WSL, the club also contested two domestic cup competitions: the FA Cup and the League Cup.

On 13 March 2020, in line with the FA's response to the coronavirus pandemic, it was announced the season was temporarily suspended until at least 3 April 2020. After further postponements, the season was ultimately ended prematurely on 25 May 2020 with immediate effect. Liverpool sat bottom of the table at the time and were relegated on sporting merit after The FA Board's decision to award places on a points-per-game basis.

== Squad ==
As of 23 January 2020.

Note: Flags indicate national team as defined under FIFA eligibility rules; some limited exceptions apply. Players may hold more than one non-FIFA nationality.

No.	Pos.	Nation	Player
1	GK	(Germany) GER	Anke Preuß
3	DF	(England) ENG	Leighanne Robe
4	MF	(Wales) WAL	Rhiannon Roberts
5	DF	(Republic of Ireland) IRL	Niamh Fahey (vice-captain)
6	DF	(England) ENG	Sophie Bradley-Auckland (captain)
7	FW	(England) ENG	Jessica Clarke
8	MF	(England) ENG	Jade Bailey
9	FW	(England) ENG	Courtney Sweetman-Kirk
10	MF	(Scotland) SCO	Christie Murray
11	MF	(England) ENG	Melissa Lawley

No.	Pos.	Nation	Player
13	GK	(Canada) CAN	Rylee Foster
14	FW	(England) ENG	Ashley Hodson
17	FW	(England) ENG	Niamh Charles
18	GK	(England) ENG	Fran Kitching
19	MF	(England) ENG	Amy Rodgers
20	FW	(England) ENG	Rinsola Babajide
22	DF	(England) ENG	Becky Jane
23	DF	(England) ENG	Jemma Purfield
24	FW	(England) ENG	Kirsty Linnett
27	MF	(Northern Ireland) NIR	Rachel Furness

== Pre-season ==
Liverpool spent part of their preseason on tour in the United States in conjunction with the men's team.

18 July 2019 Friendly	Cleveland Ambassadors (United States)	2–2	Liverpool	South Bend, Indiana
	Macario; Smith	Report	Hodson; Sweetman-Kirk	Stadium: Alumni Stadium

23 July 2019 Friendly	Metropolitan Conference Allstars (United States)	0–6	Liverpool	Boston, Massachusetts
		Report	Sweetman-Kirk x4; Babajide x2	Stadium: Jordan Field

28 July 2019 Friendly	Coventry United	2–4	Liverpool	Coventry
14:00		Report	Clarke; Jane; Charles; Hodson	Stadium: Cryfield Sports Pavilion

31 August 2019 Friendly	Liverpool	8–1	(Scotland) Rangers	Birkenhead
14:00	Babajide x4; Sweetman-Kirk x3; Linnett	Report	Robertson	Stadium: Prenton Park

== FA Women's Super League ==
=== Results summary ===
Overall								Home						Away					
Pld	W	D	L	GF	GA	GD	Pts	W	D	L	GF	GA	GD	W	D	L	GF	GA	GD
14	1	3	10	8	20	−12	6	0	3	3	5	8	−3	1	0	7	3	12	−9

Last updated: 23 February 2020.
Source: FA WSL

=== Results by matchday ===
Round	1	2	3	4	5	6	7	8	9	10	11	12	13	14	15	16	17	18	19	20	21	22
Ground	H	A	A	H	A	H	A	A	H	H	A	A	H	A	H	A	A	H	H	H	H	A
Result	L	L	L	D	L	L	L	L	D	D	L	W	L	L	C	C	C	C	C	C	C	C
Position	10	11	12	11	12	12	12	12	12	11	12	11	11	12								

A = Away; H = Home; W = Win; D = Draw; L = Loss

=== Results ===
8 September 2019 1	Liverpool	0–1	Reading	Birkenhead
14:00	Robe (yellow card) 16'	Report	Williams 42'; James (yellow card) 84'	Stadium: Prenton Park; Attendance: 1,435; Referee: Samuel Barrott

15 September 2019 2	Tottenham Hotspur	1–0	Liverpool	Canons Park
12:00	Furness 45+1' (pen.); Worm (yellow card) 47'	Report	Robe (yellow card) 54'; Fahey (red card) 65'; Lawley (yellow card) 84'	Stadium: The Hive Stadium; Attendance: 996; Referee: Ryan Atkin

28 September 2019 3	Manchester United	2–0	Liverpool	Leigh
12:00	James 71', (yellow card) 89'; Zelem 90+5' (pen.)	Report	Lawley (yellow card) 40'; Linnett (yellow card) 89'	Stadium: Leigh Sports Village; Attendance: 2,813; Referee: Lucy Oliver

13 October 2019 4	Liverpool	1–1	Bristol City	Birkenhead
12:00	Lawley 72' (pen.)	Report	Salmon 16'; Brown (yellow card) 41'	Stadium: Prenton Park; Attendance: 924; Referee: Martin Woods

27 October 2019 5	Birmingham City	2–0	Liverpool	Solihull
14:00	Harrop 9'; Arthur (yellow card) 68'; Staniforth 83'	Report		Stadium: Damson Park; Attendance: 1,056; Referee: Lisa Benn

17 November 2019 6	Liverpool	0–1	Everton	Liverpool
14:00		Report	Graham 45+1', (yellow card) 56'	Stadium: Anfield; Attendance: 23,500; Referee: Amy Fearn

24 November 2019 7	Arsenal	1–0	Liverpool	Borehamwood
14:00	Miedema 28'	Report		Stadium: Meadow Park; Attendance: 2,017; Referee: Elizabeth Simms

1 December 2019 8	Manchester City	1–0	Liverpool	Manchester
14:00	Bonner 20'	Report		Stadium: Academy Stadium; Attendance: 2,293; Referee: Kirsty Dowle

8 December 2019 9	Liverpool	1–1	West Ham United	Birkenhead
14:00	Charles 77'; Babajide (yellow card) 75'	Report	Leon 5'; Longhurst (yellow card) 66'; Kvamme (yellow card) 75'; Middag (yellow card) 90+6'	Stadium: Prenton Park; Attendance: 566; Referee: Peter Gibbons

15 December 2019 10	Liverpool	1–1	Chelsea	Birkenhead
14:00	Charles 5'; Linnett (yellow card) 59'; Jane (yellow card) 64'; Bradley-Auckland (yellow card) 78'	Report	England 15'; Cuthbert (yellow card) 84'; Eriksson (yellow card) 90+1'	Stadium: Prenton Park; Attendance: 540; Referee: Louise Saunders

5 January 2020 11	Brighton & Hove Albion	1–0	Liverpool	Crawley
14:00	Whelan 33'; Kerkdijk (yellow card) 55'; Green (yellow card) 72'	Report	Fahey (yellow card) 82'; Robe (yellow card) 90+5'	Stadium: Broadfield Stadium; Attendance: 947; Referee: Amy Fearn

12 January 2020	Liverpool	P–P	Manchester United	Birkenhead
12:00				Stadium: Prenton Park
Note: Postponed due to waterlogged pitch

19 January 2020 12	Bristol City	0–1	Liverpool	Filton
15:00	Salmon (yellow card) 90+2'	Report	Furness 13'; Roberts (yellow card) 59'	Stadium: Stoke Gifford Stadium; Attendance: 1,007; Referee: Savvas Yianni

2 February 2020	Liverpool	P–P	Birmingham City	Birkenhead
14:00				Stadium: Prenton Park
Note: Postponed due to waterlogged pitch

9 February 2020	Everton	P–P	Liverpool	Liverpool
12:30				Stadium: Goodison Park
Note: All WSL games postponed due to adverse weather conditions

13 February 2020 13	Liverpool	2–3	Arsenal	Chester
19:00	Bradley-Auckland (yellow card) 5'; Babajide 14', (yellow card) 86'; Furness 45+2'; Robe (yellow card) 52'	Report	Miedema 31', 78'; Nobbs 33'; Beattie (yellow card) 58'; McCabe (yellow card) 61'	Stadium: Deva Stadium; Attendance: 660; Referee: Rebecca Welch
Note: Moved from Prenton Park

23 February 2020 14	West Ham United	4–2	Liverpool	Romford
15:00	Leon 26', 60'; Thomas 27', 52'	Report	Furness 71', 90'; Lawley (yellow card) 77'	Stadium: Rush Green Stadium; Attendance: 1,877; Referee: Matthew Russell

22 March 2020 15	Liverpool	Cancelled	Manchester City	Birkenhead
14:00				Stadium: Prenton Park
Note: Cancelled due to coronavirus pandemic

25 March 2020 16	Everton	Cancelled	Liverpool	Liverpool
19:00				Stadium: Goodison Park
Note: Rescheduled from 9 February 2020. Cancelled due to coronavirus pandemic

29 March 2020 17	Reading	Cancelled	Liverpool	High Wycombe
14:00				Stadium: Adams Park
Note: Cancelled due to coronavirus pandemic

5 April 2020 18	Liverpool	Cancelled	Tottenham Hotspur	Birkenhead
14:00				Stadium: Prenton Park
Note: Cancelled due to coronavirus pandemic

22 April 2020 19	Liverpool	Cancelled	Birmingham City
Note: Rescheduled from 2 February 2020. Cancelled due to coronavirus pandemic

26 April 2020 20	Liverpool	Cancelled	Brighton & Hove Albion	Birkenhead
12:00				Stadium: Prenton Park

3 May 2020 21	Liverpool	Cancelled	Manchester United
Note: Rescheduled from 12 January 2020. Cancelled due to coronavirus pandemic

16 May 2020 22	Chelsea	Cancelled	Liverpool	Kingston upon Thames
				Stadium: Kingsmeadow
Note: Cancelled due to coronavirus pandemic

=== League table ===
Pos	Team	Pld	W	D	L	GF	GA	GD	Pts	PPG	Qualification
8	West Ham United	14	5	1	8	19	34	−15	16	1.14	
9	Brighton & Hove Albion	16	3	4	9	11	30	−19	13	0.81	
10	Bristol City	14	2	3	9	9	38	−29	9	0.64	
11	Birmingham City	13	2	1	10	5	23	−18	7	0.54	
12	Liverpool (R)	14	1	3	10	8	20	−12	6	0.43	Relegation to the Championship

Source: FA WSL, BBC
Rules for classification: Initially: 1) Points; 2) Goal difference; 3) Number of goals scored. After abandonment of season: 1) Points per game
(R) Relegated

== Women's FA Cup ==
As a member of the top two tiers, Liverpool entered the FA Cup in the fourth round, beating Championship side Blackburn Rovers in their opening fixture. Following a series of postponements at EFL League One ground Prenton Park, the game was moved to Blackburn's home ground at Bamber Bridge although Liverpool remained the designated home team.

26 January 2020 Fourth round	Liverpool	8–1	Blackburn Rovers	Bamber Bridge
	Babajide 10', 33', 61', 88'; Fahey 15'; Charles 36'; Linnett 90'; Stewart 90+2' (o.g.)	Report	Stewart 17' (pen.)	Stadium: Irongate; Attendance: 563; Referee: Richard Aspinall
Note: Moved from Prenton Park

17 February 2020 Fifth round	Chelsea	1–0	Liverpool	Kingston upon Thames
19:00	Reiten 26'	Report		Stadium: Kingsmeadow

== FA Women's League Cup ==
For the League Cup group stage, Liverpool were drawn as the only FA WSL team in a group that otherwise contained five FA Women's Championship teams.

=== Group stage ===
22 September 2019 Group stage	Liverpool	2–3	Sheffield United	Birkenhead
12:00	Hodson 31'; Bailey (yellow card) 58' (yellow-red card) 89'; Charles 62'	Report	Hartley (yellow card) 44'; Palmer (yellow card) 48'; Wilkinson 55'; Cusack 87'; Pennock 90+4'	Stadium: Prenton Park; Attendance: 687; Referee: Kristian Silcock

20 October 2019 Group stage	Coventry United	1–5	Liverpool	Coventry
14:00	Axten 15'	Report	Charles 3'; Linnett 5', 30', 43'; Clarke 67'	Stadium: Butts Park Arena; Attendance: 802

2 November 2019 Group stage	Aston Villa	2–0	Liverpool	Boldmere
19:30	Follis 6'; N'Dow (yellow card) 65'; Syme 86'	Report	Charles (yellow card) 44'; Linnett (yellow card) 45'	Stadium: Trevor Brown Memorial Ground; Attendance: 355; Referee: Scott Tallis

21 November 2019 Group stage	Blackburn Rovers	0–6	Liverpool	Bamber Bridge
19:45	Jordan (yellow card) 54'	Report	Roberts 10'; Babajide 23'; Lawley 29'; Hodson 35'; Sweetman-Kirk 84'; Kearns 87'	Stadium: Irongate; Attendance: 392; Referee: Edward Duckworth

11 December 2019 Group stage	Liverpool	3–1	Durham	Birkenhead
18:30	Babajide 9', 37'; Charles 43'	Report	Sharpe 58'	Stadium: Prenton Park; Attendance: 215; Referee: Dale Baines

Pos	Team	Pld	W	WPEN	LPEN	L	GF	GA	GD	Pts	Qualification	SHU	AST	LIV	DUR	COV	BLB
1	Sheffield United	5	3	0	1	1	14	8	+6	10	Advance to Knock-out stage	—	—	—	—	2–2	4–1
2	Aston Villa	5	3	0	1	1	12	8	+4	10	Advance to Knock-out stage	3–1	—	2–0	—	—	5–2
3	Liverpool	5	3	0	0	2	16	7	+9	9		2–3	—	—	3–1	—	—
4	Durham	5	3	0	0	2	11	8	+3	9		0–4	3–0	—	—	4–0	—
5	Coventry United	5	0	3	0	2	6	14	−8	6		—	2–2	1–5	—	—	1–1
6	Blackburn Rovers	5	0	0	1	4	5	19	−14	1		—	—	0–6	1–3	—	—

Updated to match(es) played on 11 December 2019. Source: thefa.com
Rules for classification: 1) Points; 2) Goal difference; 3) Number of goals scored; 4) Number of wins; 5) Head-to-head record

== Squad statistics ==
=== Appearances ===
Starting appearances are listed first, followed by substitute appearances after the + symbol where applicable.

No.	Pos	Nat	Player	Total		FA WSL		FA Cup		League Cup	
No.	Pos	Nat	Player	Apps	Goals	Apps	Goals	Apps	Goals	Apps	Goals
1	GK	(Germany) GER	Anke Preuß	14	0	10	0	2	0	2	0
3	DF	(England) ENG	Leighanne Robe	21	0	14	0	1+1	0	5	0
4	MF	(Wales) WAL	Rhiannon Roberts	15	1	9+3	0	0	0	3	1
5	DF	(Republic of Ireland) IRL	Niamh Fahey	18	1	13	0	2	1	3	0
6	DF	(England) ENG	Sophie Bradley-Auckland	20	0	14	0	1	0	5	0
7	FW	(England) ENG	Jessica Clarke	12	1	4+3	0	0+2	0	2+1	1
8	MF	(England) ENG	Jade Bailey	19	0	13	0	2	0	4	0
9	FW	(England) ENG	Courtney Sweetman-Kirk	16	1	7+4	0	0+1	0	1+3	1
10	MF	(Scotland) SCO	Christie Murray	10	0	0+6	0	0+1	0	2+1	0
11	MF	(England) ENG	Melissa Lawley	19	2	14	1	2	0	3	1
13	GK	(Canada) CAN	Rylee Foster	0	0	0	0	0	0	0	0
14	FW	(England) ENG	Ashley Hodson	20	2	2+11	0	2	0	4+1	2
17	FW	(England) ENG	Niamh Charles	19	6	13	2	2	1	3+1	3
18	GK	(England) ENG	Fran Kitching	7	0	4	0	0	0	3	0
19	MF	(England) ENG	Amy Rodgers	7	0	3	0	1	0	2+1	0
20	FW	(England) ENG	Rinsola Babajide	17	8	7+5	1	1	4	4	3
22	DF	(England) ENG	Becky Jane	20	0	14	0	1	0	5	0
23	DF	(England) ENG	Jemma Purfield	6	0	1+1	0	2	0	2	0
24	FW	(England) ENG	Kirsty Linnett	18	4	8+3	0	1+1	1	3+2	3
27	MF	(Northern Ireland) NIR	Rachel Furness	6	4	4	4	2	0	0	0
Players away from the club on loan:
21	MF	(England) ENG	Missy Bo Kearns	3	1	0	0	0	0	0+3	1

=== Goalscorers ===
Rank	No.	Pos.	Name	FA WSL	FA Cup	League Cup	Total
1	20	FW	(England) Rinsola Babajide	1	4	3	8
2	17	FW	(England) Niamh Charles	2	1	3	6
3	24	FW	(England) Kirsty Linnett	0	1	3	4
3	27	MF	(Northern Ireland) Rachel Furness	4	0	0	4
5	11	MF	(England) Melissa Lawley	1	0	1	2
5	14	FW	(England) Ashley Hodson	0	0	2	2
7	4	MF	(Wales) Rhiannon Roberts	0	0	1	1
7	5	DF	(Republic of Ireland) Niamh Fahey	0	1	0	1
7	7	FW	(England) Jessica Clarke	0	0	1	1
7	9	FW	(England) Courtney Sweetman-Kirk	0	0	1	1
7	21	MF	(England) Missy Bo Kearns	0	0	1	1
Own goal				0	1	0	1
Total				8	8	16	32

== Transfers ==
=== Transfers in ===
Date	Position	Nationality	Name	From	Ref.
10 June 2019	DF	(England)	Becky Jane	(England) Reading	
15 June 2019	MF	(England)	Melissa Lawley	(England) Manchester City	
9 July 2019	MF	(England)	Jade Bailey	(England) Chelsea	
28 December 2019	MF	(Northern Ireland)	Rachel Furness	(England) Reading	
23 January 2020	GK	(Canada)	Rylee Foster	(United States) West Virginia Mountaineers	

=== Transfers out ===
Date	Position	Nationality	Name	To	Ref.
24 May 2019	MF	(England)	Laura Coombs	(England) Manchester City	
24 May 2019	DF	(England)	Leandra Little	(England) Sheffield United	
15 June 2019	DF	(England)	Jasmine Matthews	(England) Bristol City	
15 June 2019	FW	(Belgium)	Yana Daniëls	(England) Bristol City	
19 June 2019	MF	(England)	Aimee Everett	(England) Leicester City	
22 June 2019	FW	(England)	Annabel Blanchard	(England) Leicester City	
12 August 2019	MF	(England)	Lauren Thomas	(England) Blackburn Rovers	
23 January 2020	DF	(England)	Ellie Fletcher	(England) Blackburn Rovers	

=== Loans out ===
Date	Position	Nationality	Name	To	Until	Ref.
24 August 2019	DF	(England)	Ellie Fletcher	(England) Sheffield United	Recalled 10 January 2020	
10 January 2020	MF	(England)	Missy Bo Kearns	(England) Blackburn Rovers	End of season	
