= Cassia Pike =

Welsh association football player

Personal information
- Date of birth: 27 December 2000 (age 25)
- Place of birth: Porthmadog, Wales
- Position: Striker

Team information
- Current team: Liverpool
- Number: 15

Youth career
- –2017: Liverpool

Senior career*
Years	Team	Apps	(Gls)
2017–	Liverpool	1	(0)

International career^{‡}
- Wales U15
- Wales U17
2017–	Wales U19	9	(3)
- * Club domestic league appearances and goals as of 17:56 20 February 2019 ‡ National team caps and goals as of 17:56 20 February 2019

Cassia Pike (born 27 December 2000) is a Welsh professional footballer who plays as a striker for Liverpool F.C. Women of the FA Women's Super League.

Pike was born in Porthmadog and has played for Liverpool her entire career.

== Early life ==
Pike was born in Porthmadog, Wales. Pike studied BTEC Level 3 Sport (Developing coaching and Fitness) at Coleg Menai.

== Club career ==
Pike joined Liverpool at the age of 9 and has stayed there ever since.

In the 2017/18 season, Pike was promoted to the senior team. She made her debut on 5 December 2017 against Sunderland in a 1–0 loss in the WSL Cup coming on for Ashley Hodson in the 76th minute. On 27 January 2018, Pike made her home and league debut in a 2–0 win coming on in the 81st minute for Jessica Clarke.

== Career statistics ==
=== Club ===
Club	Season	League			League Cup		FA Cup		Total	
Club	Season	Division	Apps	Goals	Apps	Goals	Apps	Goals	Apps	Goals
Liverpool F.C.	2017-18	FA WSL	1	0	0	0	1	0	2	0
