= Natasha Harding =

Welsh footballer (born 1989)

Personal information
- Full name: Natasha Marie Harding
- Date of birth: 2 March 1989 (age 37)
- Place of birth: Caerphilly, Wales
- Positions: Forward; fullback

Senior career*
Years	Team	Apps	(Gls)
2007–2012	Cardiff City	1	(0)
2012–2014	Bristol Academy	39	(8)
2015	Manchester City	10	(1)
2016–2017	Liverpool	29	(11)
2018–2022	Reading	84	(4)
2022–2023	Aston Villa	4	(0)

International career^{‡}
2008–2022	Wales	103	(26)
- * Club domestic league appearances and goals as of 31 May 2023 ‡ National team caps and goals as of 27 April 2024

Natasha Marie Harding (born 2 March 1989) is a retired Welsh footballer. Harding began her career with Cardiff City and has also played in the FA WSL for Bristol Academy and Manchester City.

== Club career ==
Harding began her career at Cardiff City and made her first team debut in January 2007, during a 4–0 Welsh Women's Cup quarter final win over Newport Strikers. Harding came on as a second-half substitute for Gwennan Harries. She subsequently represented the club in the 2007–08 UEFA Women's Cup.

She went on to captain Cardiff City, then joined Bristol Academy ahead of the 2012 FA WSL campaign. Bristol manager Mark Sampson said of Harding: "Tash will really bring another dimension to our forward play, a striker who can play off the shoulder and with great speed was something we were missing last season so it will give us far more variation to our play going forward." At the end of the 2014 season Harding signed for the Washington Spirit, but her move fell through over visa issues and she signed instead for Manchester City.

In January 2016, Harding was sold by Manchester City, who had signed Swedish forward Kosovare Asllani. Later that week she signed for Liverpool. Harding left Liverpool Ladies in December 2017. Reading Women snapped up the Welsh international on a free transfer in January 2018 Since joining the Royals in 2018, Harding has been named captain. On 3 May 2022, Reading announced that Harding would leave the club at the end of the season.

On 16 September 2023, Harding announced her retirement from football.

== International career ==
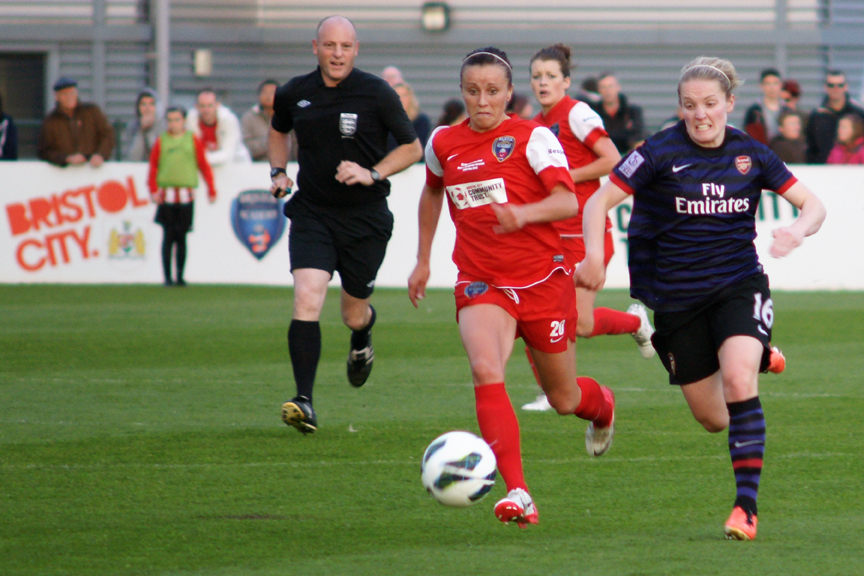

Harding played five times for the Wales Under-19 team in season 2007–08. She made her senior international debut, aged 19, as a late substitute in a 2–0 defeat to Switzerland in Oberdorf on 8 May 2008.

Harding scored her first goals for Wales on 20 June 2012 in a UEFA Qualifying match against Israel at the Racecourse Ground in Wrexham. She scored a hat-trick in a 5–0 win to cap a fine evening both personally and for her country.

As a student at UWIC, Harding was called–up to represent Great Britain at the 2011 World University Games in Shenzhen, China.

On 12 April 2022, she played her 100th match for Wales in a 3–0 win over Kazakhstan in the 2023 FIFA Women's World Cup qualification.

== International goals ==
No.	Date	Venue	Opponent	Score	Result	Competition
1.	20 June 2012	Racecourse Ground, Wrexham, Wales	Israel	1–0	5–0	UEFA Women's Euro 2013 qualifying
2.	20 June 2012	Racecourse Ground, Wrexham, Wales	Israel	2–0	5–0	UEFA Women's Euro 2013 qualifying
3.	20 June 2012	Racecourse Ground, Wrexham, Wales	Israel	3–0	5–0	UEFA Women's Euro 2013 qualifying
4.	7 April 2013	East End Park, Dunfermline, Scotland	Scotland	1–1	1–2	Friendly
5.	4 April 2014	Eskişehir Atatürk Stadium, Eskişehir, Turkey	Turkey	5–0	5–1	2015 FIFA Women's World Cup qualification
6.	9 April 2014	Parc y Scarlets, Llanelli, Wales	Ukraine	1–1	1–1	2015 FIFA Women's World Cup qualification
7.	19 June 2014	Traktor Stadium, Minsk, Belarus	Belarus	1–0	3–0	2015 FIFA Women's World Cup qualification
8.	19 June 2014	Traktor Stadium, Minsk, Belarus	Belarus	2–0	3–0	2015 FIFA Women's World Cup qualification
9.	19 June 2014	Traktor Stadium, Minsk, Belarus	Belarus	3–0	3–0	2015 FIFA Women's World Cup qualification
10.	26 November 2015	Bridge Meadow Stadium, Haverfordwest, Wales	Kazakhstan	1–0	4–0	UEFA Women's Euro 2017 qualifying
11.	1 December 2015	Ramat Gan Stadium, Ramat Gan, Israel	Israel	1–1	2–2	UEFA Women's Euro 2017 qualifying
12.	1 December 2015	Ramat Gan Stadium, Ramat Gan, Israel	Israel	2–1	2–2	UEFA Women's Euro 2017 qualifying
13.	5 April 2017	CCB Centre for Sporting Excellence, Ystrad Mynach, Wales	Northern Ireland	3–1	3–1	Friendly
14.	12 June 2018	Newport Stadium, Newport, Wales	Russia	3–0	3–0	2019 FIFA Women's World Cup qualification
15.	29 August 2019	Tórsvøllur, Tórshavn, Faroe Islands	Faroe Islands	1–0	6–0	UEFA Women's Euro 2022 qualifying
16.	29 August 2019	Tórsvøllur, Tórshavn, Faroe Islands	Faroe Islands	3–0	6–0	UEFA Women's Euro 2022 qualifying
17.	29 August 2019	Tórsvøllur, Tórshavn, Faroe Islands	Faroe Islands	5–0	6–0	UEFA Women's Euro 2022 qualifying
18.	22 October 2020	Rodney Parade, Newport, Wales	Faroe Islands	2–0	4–0	UEFA Women's Euro 2022 qualifying
19.	22 October 2020	Rodney Parade, Newport, Wales	Faroe Islands	3–0	4–0	UEFA Women's Euro 2022 qualifying
20.	1 December 2020	Rodney Parade, Newport, Wales	Belarus	1–0	3–0	UEFA Women's Euro 2022 qualifying
21.	17 September 2021	Parc y Scarlets, Llanelli, Wales	Kazakhstan	2–0	6–0	2023 FIFA Women's World Cup qualification
22.	21 September 2021	Pärnu Rannastaadion, Pärnu, Estonia	Estonia	1–0	1–0	2023 FIFA Women's World Cup qualification
23.	26 October 2021	Cardiff City Stadium, Cardiff, Wales	Estonia	3–0	4–0	2023 FIFA Women's World Cup qualification
24.	26 November 2021	Parc y Scarlets, Llanelli, Wales	Greece	5–0	5–0	2023 FIFA Women's World Cup qualification
25.	16 February 2022	Pinatar Arena, San Pedro del Pinatar, Spain	Scotland	3–1	3–1	2022 Pinatar Cup
26.	12 April 2022	Astana Arena, Nur-Sultan, Kazakhstan	Kazakhstan	2–0	3–0	2023 FIFA Women's World Cup qualification

== Allegations of financial impropriety ==
In November 2024, BBC News reported allegations against Harding (now using her married name of Allen-Wyatt), of taking payments for undelivered football coaching, unpaid loans and unfulfilled sponsorship deals. Up to 70 parents and businesses claimed losses totaling nearly £70,000.

== Career statistics ==
=== Club ===
As of match played 27 May 2023

Appearances and goals by club, season and competition
Club	Season	League			National Cup		League Cup		Continental		Other		Total	
Club	Season	Division	Apps	Goals	Apps	Goals	Apps	Goals	Apps	Goals	Apps	Goals	Apps	Goals
Bristol Academy	2012	WSL	14	3	0	0	4	1	-		-		18	4
Bristol Academy	2013	WSL	14	4	0	0	2	0	-		-		16	4
Bristol Academy	2014	WSL	11	1	0	0	5	3	4	2	-		20	6
Bristol Academy	Total		39	8	0	0	11	4	4	2	-	-	54	14
Manchester City	2015	WSL	10	1	0	0	1	0	-		-		11	1
Liverpool	2016	WSL	16	3	0	0	2	0	-		-		18	2
Liverpool	2017	WSL	8	4	0	0	-	-	-		-		8	4
Liverpool	2017–18	WSL	5	4	0	0	3	0	-		-		8	4
Liverpool	Total		29	11	0	0	5	0	-	-	-	-	34	10
Reading	2017–18	WSL	13	0	-	-	0	0	-		-		13	0
Reading	2018–19	WSL	19	1	3	0	5	0	-		-		27	1
Reading	2019–20	WSL	8	0	2	0	2	0	-		-		12	0
Reading	2020–21	WSL	22	3	1	0	4	3	-		-		26	6
Reading	2021–22	WSL	22	0	2	0	2	0	—		—		26	0
Reading	Total		84	4	8	0	12	3	-	-	-	-	104	7
Aston Villa	2022–23	WSL	4	0	0	0	2	0	—		—		6	0
Career total			166	24	8	0	31	7	4	2	-	-	209	32

== Honours ==
Individual

- Welsh Footballer of the Year: 2016
