= Laura Coombs =

English footballer (born 1991)

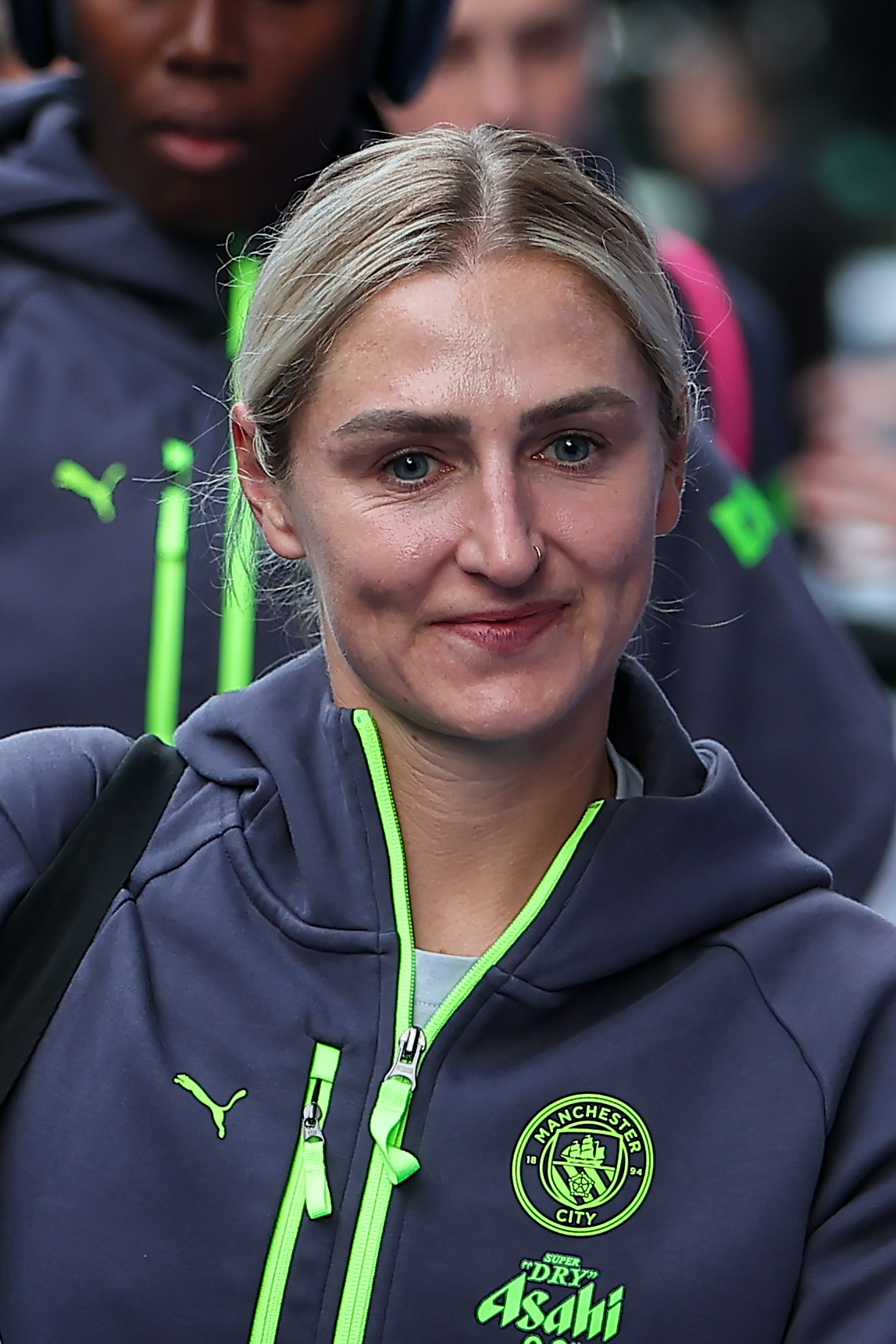
- Coombs in 2025

Personal information
- Full name: Laura Charlotte Coombs
- Date of birth: 29 January 1991 (age 35)
- Place of birth: Gravesend, England
- Height: 5 ft 5 in (1.65 m)
- Position: Midfielder

Youth career
- Charlton Athletic
- Arsenal

Senior career*
Years	Team	Apps	(Gls)
2007–2011	Arsenal	10	(0)
2010	→ Nottingham Forest (loan)	8	(0)
2011	→ Los Angeles Strikers (loan)	8	(1)
2011–2017	Chelsea	52	(1)
2012–2013	→ Barnet (loan)	4	(1)
2013	→ Los Angeles Strikers (loan)		
2016	→ Liverpool (loan)	13	(1)
2017–2019	Liverpool	45	(4)
2019–2026	Manchester City	93	(16)
Total		233	(24)

International career^{‡}
2009–2010	England U19	12	(3)
2012–2014	England U23	6	(1)
2015–2023	England	7	(0)
Medal record
Women's football
Representing England
UEFA–CONMEBOL Finalissima
Winner	2023 England
FIFA Women's World Cup
Runner-up	2023 Australia and New Zealand
- * Club domestic league appearances and goals as of 13:20, 17 May 2026 (UTC) ‡ National team caps and goals as of 15:17, 1 August 2023 (UTC)

Laura Charlotte Coombs (born 29 January 1991) is an English former professional footballer who played as a midfielder.

A defensive midfielder, Coombs has been described by former teammate Gilly Flaherty as "a real grafter [...] she'll put in the work that some people don't want to do." Coombs made her senior career debut for Arsenal in 2007. She went on to play for Chelsea and Liverpool before joining Manchester City in 2019.

Coombs made her debut for the senior England national team in October 2015. She was awarded the Legacy number 193 by The Football Association in 2022.

== Club career ==
=== Early career ===
Coombs began playing football aged seven or eight, when she joined a team run by her best friend's father. She progressed to Arsenal's youth academy and began playing in the first team at 16. In September 2009, Coombs made her UEFA Champions League debut in Arsenal's 9–0 win over PAOK Thessaloniki. In summer 2011, Coombs played for American W-League team Los Angeles Strikers, scoring one goal in eight appearances.

=== Chelsea ===
During the mid-season break of the inaugural 2011 FA WSL season, Coombs transferred to Chelsea. The club reached the FA Women's Cup final for the first time in 2012, but were eventually beaten by Birmingham City in a penalty shootout after twice taking the lead in a 2–2 draw. In the 2013 mid-season break, Coombs had another stint with LA Strikers. At the 2013 International Women's Club Championship Coombs scored in Chelsea's 3–2 semi-final win over Sydney FC in Okayama, Japan.

In 2015 Chelsea won their first ever major trophy, in the 2015 FA Women's Cup Final at Wembley Stadium. They then beat Sunderland 4–0 in October 2015 to secure the FA WSL title and a League and Cup double. Teammates noted an improvement in Coombs' strength and power that season, a result of the team's transition from part-time to full-time training.

=== Liverpool ===
Coombs announced a season-long loan move to FA WSL rivals Liverpool on 22 December 2015, the same day as Chelsea signed Karen Carney from Birmingham City. During 2017 she eventually signed a two-year deal at Liverpool.

=== Manchester City ===
In June 2019, after three years at Liverpool, Coombs signed for Manchester City on a two-year contract, being part of the squad that won the 2020 FA Cup in her first season. Though she had not expected "to get straight in the team", Coombs later expressed disappointment at how little she had played for the club in her first season with them, remarking that she is a confidence player. She felt that time away from Man City due to the COVID-19 pandemic after her difficult first season helped her come back better for the team.

Coombs' second season at Manchester City was marked by a midfield featuring prominent American and British internationals, with Coombs pleased to be able to work with and be challenged by them in training, as it made her raise her level. In May 2021 she signed a two-year contract extension. In the 2021–22 season, City won the 2022 League Cup.

In the first half of the 2022–23 season, Coombs almost matched her total appearance count for Manchester City in her previous three seasons with them, having been elevated to a regular starter following the departure of the club's previous starting midfield three; she took on the role of an aggressive centre midfielder and had a strong start to the season. During this time, she was a constant in a midfield that gradually incorporated different new signings. While other adaptations were made, Coombs retained her typical role. She made her 100th appearance for the club on 17 December 2023.

On 4 August 2025, it was announced that Coombs had signed a one-year contract extension with Manchester City, with the club praising her influence and popularity off the pitch as well as on it.

On 30 April 2026, Coombs announced that she would retire from football at the end of the season. She scored in her final WSL match, a 4–1 away win against West Ham United, on 16 May.

== International career ==
In July 2009, Coombs featured as England under-19 won the 2009 UEFA U19 Championship in Belarus, with a 2–0 final win over Sweden. In 2010 England reached the final of the 2010 UEFA U19 Championship in Macedonia, where they lost their title to France. Coombs had been ruled out by injury before the semi-final.

National coach Mark Sampson gave Coombs her first senior call up in October 2015 for the China Cup. She won her first England cap on 23 October 2015, as a substitute in England's 2–1 defeat by China in Yongchuan, also earning a few minutes in another match of the same tournament. In 2020, she was called up for England training camp but did not play.

Having not played for England since 2015, Coombs was named in the squad for the 2023 Arnold Clark Cup after performing well with more regular playing time at Man City. The Offside Rule also said that she offers more age and experience for the attacking half of the England squad. She became the oldest player in the squad and said that, though always wanting to represent her country, she had parked those aspirations after not being called up in so long. She came on as a substitute for former City teammate Georgia Stanway in their first match and started in the next. In May 2023, Coombs was named in England's squad for the 2023 FIFA World Cup, where she made two appearances in the group stage matches.

== Personal life ==
Coombs graduated from the University of Hertfordshire with a degree in HR and business. She aims to eventually become an entrepreneur.

== Career statistics ==
=== Club ===
As of match played 31 May 2026

Appearances and goals by club, season and competition
Club	Season	League			FA cup		League cup		Continental (Note: UEFA Women's Champions League)		Total	
Club	Season	Division	Apps	Goals	Apps	Goals	Apps	Goals	Apps	Goals	Apps	Goals
Arsenal	2007–08	Women's Premier League	1	0	0	0	—		0	0	1	0
Arsenal	2008–09	Women's Premier League	2	0	1	0	—		2	0	5	0
Arsenal	2009–10	Women's Premier League	6	0	2	0	—		3	1	11	1
Arsenal	2011	Women's Super League	1	0	0	0	0	0	0	0	1	0
Arsenal	Total		10	0	3	0	0	0	5	1	18	1
Nottingham Forest (loan)	2009–10	Women's Premier League	8	0	0	0	—		—		8	0
Los Angeles Strikers (loan)	2011	USL W-League	8	1	—		—		—		8	1
Chelsea	2011	Women's Super League	6	0	0	0	1	0	—		7	0
Chelsea	2012	Women's Super League	13	1	4	0	3	0	—		20	1
Chelsea	2013	Women's Super League	9	0	?	?	3	0	—		12	0
Chelsea	2014	Women's Super League	11	0	2	1	4	1	—		17	2
Chelsea	2015	Women's Super League	13	0	?	?	6	2	4	0	23	2
Chelsea	Total		52	1	6	1	17	3	4	0	79	5
Barnet (loan)	2012–13	Women's Premier League	4	1	1	0	—		—		5	1
Los Angeles Strikers (loan)	2013	USL W-League	Stats unavailable									
Liverpool (loan)	2016	Women's Super League	13	1	1	0	1	0	—		15	1
Liverpool	2017	Women's Super League	8	1	0	0	—		—		8	1
Liverpool	2017–18	Women's Super League	17	3	1	0	1	0	—		19	3
Liverpool	2018–19	Women's Super League	20	0	3	0	4	0	—		27	0
Liverpool	Total		58	5	5	0	6	0	—		69	5
Manchester City	2019–20	Women's Super League	4	0	3	1	4	1	1	0	12	2
Manchester City	2020–21	Women's Super League	13	2	4	0	3	1	5	0	25	3
Manchester City	2021–22	Women's Super League	16	4	4	0	5	0	2	0	27	4
Manchester City	2022–23	Women's Super League	22	5	2	0	2	0	2	0	28	5
Manchester City	2023–24	Women's Super League	17	3	3	1	6	1	—		26	5
Manchester City	2024–25	Women's Super League	11	0	2	1	1	1	6	0	20	2
Manchester City	2025–26	Women's Super League	10	2	5	3	5	2	—		20	7
Manchester City	Total		93	16	23	6	26	6	16	0	158	28
Career total			233	24	38	7	49	9	25	1	345	41

=== International ===
As of match played 1 August 2023

Appearances and goals by national team and year
National team	Year	Apps	Goals
England	2015	2	0
England	2023	5	0
Total		7	0

== Honours ==
Chelsea

- FA WSL: 2015 FA WSL
- Women's FA Cup: 2014–15

Manchester City

- Women's Super League: 2025–26
- Women's FA Cup: 2019–20, 2025–26
- FA WSL Cup: 2021–22

England

- FIFA Women's World Cup runner-up: 2023
- Women's Finalissima: 2023
- Arnold Clark Cup: 2023

Individual

- PFA WSL Fans' Player of the Month: December 2022
