= Ali Johnson =

English footballer (born 1998)

Personal information
- Full name: Alicia Violet Johnson
- Date of birth: 24 December 1998 (age 27)
- Place of birth: Derby, Derbyshire, England
- Height: 1.60 m (5 ft 3 in)
- Position: Full-back

Youth career
- –2015: Blackburn Rovers
- 2016–2017: Liverpool

Senior career*
Years	Team	Apps	(Gls)
2015–2016	Blackburn Rovers	12	(2)
2017–2018	Liverpool	17	(0)
2018–2019	Bristol City	3	(0)
2019–2020	Sheffield United	7	(0)
2020–2021	Blackburn Rovers	10	(0)
2021-2022	Durham	6	(2)
2023-2025	Darwen		
2025-	Wythenshawe		

International career
2017	England U20	1	(0)
- * Club domestic league appearances and goals as of 18 January 2021

Alicia Violet Johnson (born 24 December 1998) is an English footballer who plays as a full-back.

== Club career ==
A product of Blackburn Rovers' Centre of Excellence, Johnson joined the senior team in the 2015–16 season, scoring 6 goals in 17 appearances in all competitions. In February 2016, Johnson left the club to join Liverpool's youth development programme. She made her senior debut on 19 March 2017, in a 2–1 win over Everton in the fifth round of the FA Women's Cup. On 11 October 2017, she scored her first goal for the Reds in a 6–0 victory against Sheffield in the Continental Cup. On 23 November 2017, Johnson signed a new contract with the club. She finished the 2017–18 season with three goals in 18 appearances in all competitions. On 20 July 2018, she was released by the club following the expiration of her contract. On 24 July 2018, she joined Bristol City. Johnson was represented by Bethany England's agent, John Sorzano.

== International career ==
In July 2018, she was selected in the squad for the 2018 FIFA U-20 Women's World Cup in France.

== Career statistics ==
=== Club ===
As of 9 August 2019.

Club	League	Season	League		Cup (Note: Includes the FA Women's Cup)		League Cup (Note: Includes the FA Women's Premier League Cup and the FA WSL Cup)		Continental (Note: Includes the UEFA Women's Champions League)		Total	
Club	League	Season	Apps	Goals	Apps	Goals	Apps	Goals	Apps	Goals	Apps	Goals
Blackburn Rovers	WPL North	2015–16	12	2	2	1	3	3	—		17	6
Liverpool	FA WSL	2017	5	0	3	0	—		—		8	0
Liverpool	FA WSL	2017–18	12	0	3	1	3	2	—		18	3
Liverpool	Total		17	0	6	1	3	2	0	0	26	3
Bristol City	FA WSL	2018–19	3	0	0	0	1	0	—		4	0
Sheffield United	Championship	2019–20	0	0	0	0	0	0	—		0	0
Career total			32	2	8	2	7	5	0	0	47	9
