= Ashley Hodson =

English footballer (born 1995)

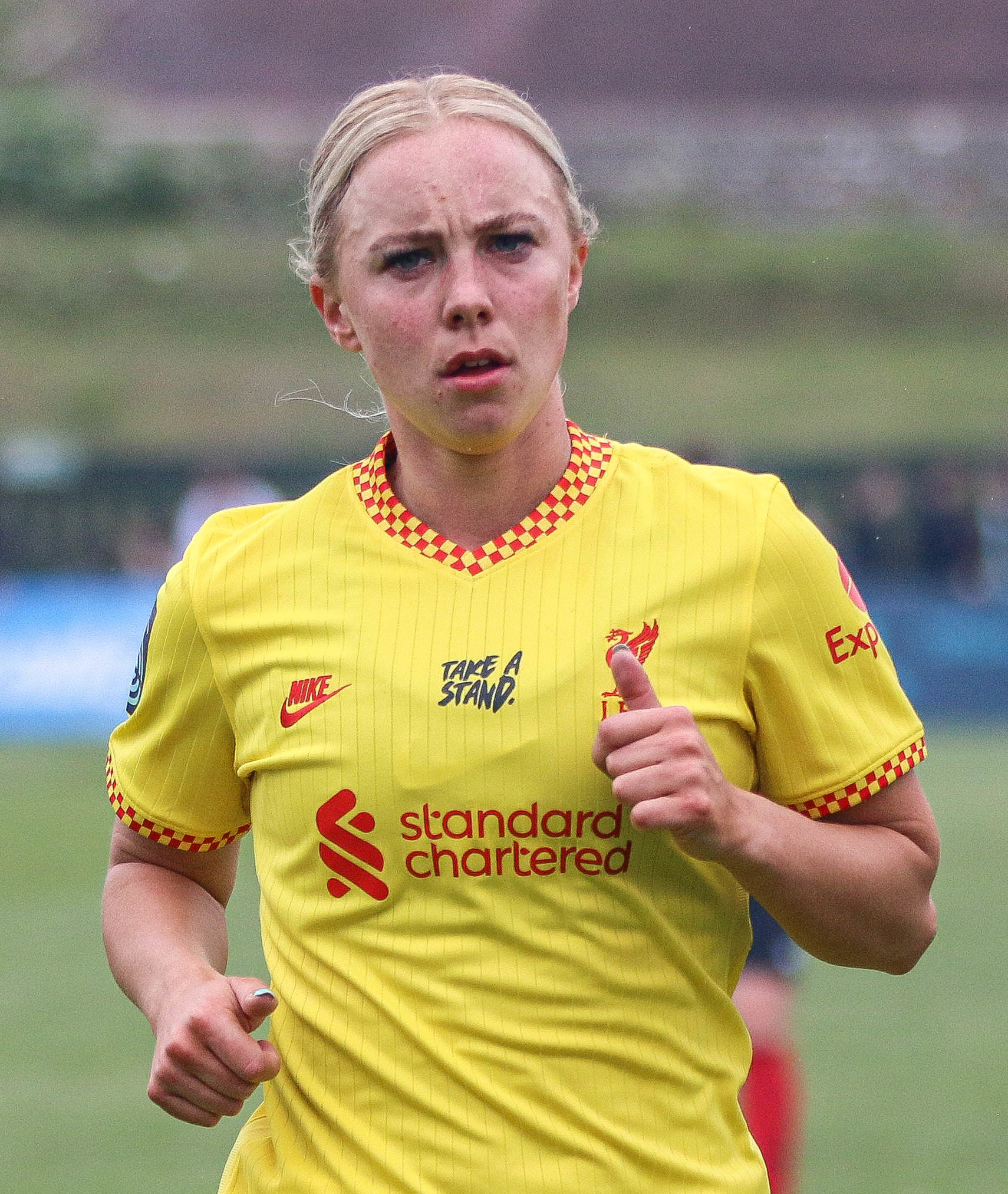
- Hodson playing for Liverpool in 2022

Personal information
- Full name: Ashley Hodson
- Date of birth: 6 May 1995 (age 31)
- Place of birth: Prescot, Merseyside, England
- Position: Midfielder

Youth career
- –2014: Liverpool

Senior career*
Years	Team	Apps	(Gls)
2014–2023	Liverpool	136	(4)
2022–2023	→ Birmingham City (loan)	16	(3)
2023–2024	Sheffield United	22	(3)
- * Club domestic league appearances and goals as of 23:10, 28 April 2024 (UTC)

Ashley Hodson (born 6 May 1995) is an English former professional footballer who played as a midfielder. Hodson spent nine seasons playing for Women's Super League club Liverpool, and also played for Birmingham City and Sheffield United.

== Club career ==
=== Liverpool ===
A product of Liverpool's youth development programme, Hodson made her senior debut on 13 April 2014, in a 2–0 win over Sunderland in the fifth round of the FA Women's Cup. On 20 April 2014, she made her league debut in a 0–0 draw against Chelsea.

In the 2014 season, she made a total of 11 appearances in all competitions and won her first FA WSL title.

Hodson underwent knee surgery in April 2015 and was unable to play for four months. On 30 July 2015, Hodson scored her first goal in a 3–0 away victory against Doncaster Rovers Belles in the FA WSL Cup. On 7 October 2015, she made her UEFA Women's Champions League debut in a 1–0 away loss to Brescia. On 25 November 2015, Hodson signed a new contract with the club. In the 2015 season, she made a total of 18 appearances, scoring one goal.

In the 2016 season, she made 10 league appearances and 2 FA WSL Cup appearances. In the 2017 season, she started every league and FA Women's Cup match, making a total of 11 appearances.

Hodson made her 50th domestic appearance for Liverpool in a 2–0 win over Everton on the opening day of the 2017–18 season. On 23 November 2017, Liverpool announced that Hodson had signed new deal with the club. On 18 February 2018, she scored her first FA Women's Cup goal in a 3–0 away victory against Chichester City. In May 2018, Hodson suffered an anterior cruciate ligament injury during training.

On 11 November 2019, Hodson extended her contract with Liverpool.

On 17 June 2021, Hodson signed a new contract with Liverpool. In 2021, Hodson became Liverpool Women's all-time top appearance maker. At the time of leaving Liverpool in July 2023, she had made 135 appearances for the club. Hodson's appearance record was broken by Gemma Bonner in November 2023.

==== Birmingham City (loan) ====
On 28 July 2022, Hodson joined Birmingham City on a loan until the end of the season. She scored her first goal for the club on 27 August 2022 in a league match against Sunderland.

=== Sheffield United ===
On 23 July 2023, Hodson signed for Sheffield United.

On 30 July 2024, Hodson announced her retirement from professional football.

== Post-playing career ==
As of 2026, Hodson has worked as a Community Liaison Executive for the Professional Footballers' Association.

== Personal life ==
Hodson attended Edge Hill University, where she studied Sports and Exercise Psychology. Hodson is in a relationship with professional footballer Lauren Hemp.

== Career statistics ==
As of match played 30 April 2023.

Club	League	Season	League		National cup (Note: Includes the FA Women's Cup)		League cup (Note: Includes the FA WSL Cup)		Continental (Note: Includes the UEFA Women's Champions League)		Total	
Club	League	Season	Apps	Goals	Apps	Goals	Apps	Goals	Apps	Goals	Apps	Goals
Liverpool	2014	FA WSL 1	6	0	2	0	3	0	—		11	0
Liverpool	2015	FA WSL	9	0	0	0	7	1	2	0	18	1
Liverpool	2016	FA WSL	10	0	0	0	2	0	—		12	0
Liverpool	2017	FA WSL	8	0	3	0	—		—		11	0
Liverpool	2017–18	FA WSL	12	1	2	1	5	1	—		19	3
Liverpool	2018–19	FA WSL	6	1	3	1	0	0	—		9	2
Liverpool	2019–20	FA WSL	13	0	2	0	5	2	—		20	2
Liverpool	2020–21	Championship	12	0	0	0	2	0	—		14	0
Liverpool	2021–22	Championship	13	2	0	0	5	0	—		18	2
Liverpool	Total		89	4	12	2	29	4	2	0	132	10
Birmingham City (loan)	2022–23	Championship	16	3	2	1	1	0	—		19	4
Birmingham City (loan)	Total		16	3	2	1	1	0	2	0	19	4
Sheffield United F.C.	2023-24	Championship	15	3	1	0	2	0			18	3
	Total		15	3	1	0	2	0	2	0	18	3
Career total			120	10	15	3	32	4	2	0	169	17

== Honours ==
Liverpool

- FA WSL: 2014
- FA Women's Championship: 2021–22
