= Siobhan Chamberlain =

English footballer, sports pundit, and commentator

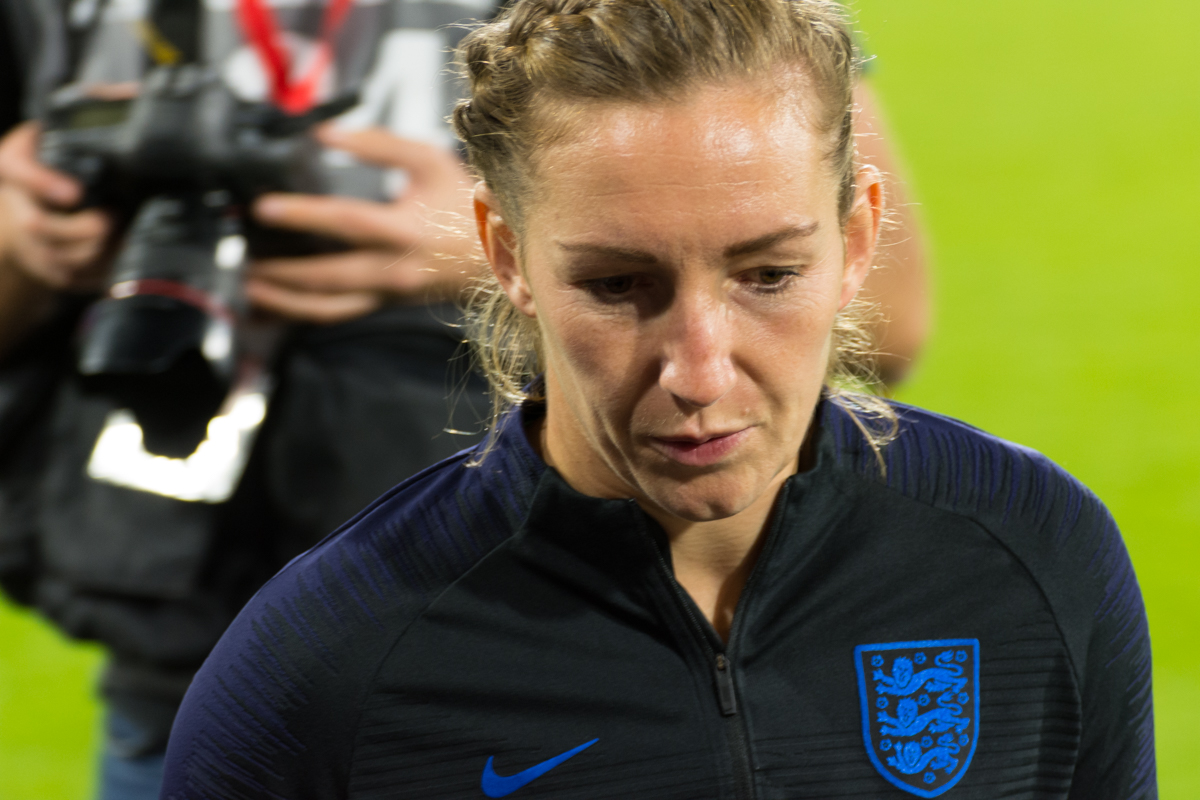
- Chamberlain with England in 2018

Personal information
- Full name: Siobhan Rebecca Chamberlain
- Date of birth: 15 August 1983 (age 43)
- Place of birth: London, England
- Height: 5 ft 11 in (1.80 m)
- Position: Goalkeeper

Senior career*
Years	Team	Apps	(Gls)
1999–2003	Chelsea		
2003–2004	Fulham		
2004–2005	Birmingham City	2	(0)
2005–2007	Bristol Academy	38	(0)
2007–2010	Chelsea	55	(0)
2010	Vancouver Whitecaps	8	(0)
2010–2013	Bristol Academy	42	(0)
2014–2015	Arsenal	2	(0)
2015	→ Notts County (loan)	2	(0)
2015–2018	Liverpool	39	(0)
2018–2020	Manchester United	18	(0)
Total		206	(0)

International career
2004–2018	England	50	(0)
Medal record
Women's football
Representing England
FIFA Women's World Cup
Bronze medal – third place	2015 Canada
- * Club domestic league appearances and goals

Siobhan Rebecca Chamberlain (born 15 August 1983) is an English sports pundit, commentator, and former professional footballer who last played as a goalkeeper for Manchester United.

She joined Manchester United in 2018 after playing for Liverpool. Before joining Liverpool in December 2015, she had been at Notts County on loan from Arsenal. Chamberlain previously played at the top club level for Chelsea, Fulham, Birmingham City and Bristol Academy, as well as for North American W-League club Vancouver Whitecaps. She has represented the England women's national football team on 50 occasions since her debut in 2004. This included being part of the squad at three FIFA Women's World Cups and three UEFA Women's Championships.

== Club career ==
=== Early career ===
A childhood gymnast, Chamberlain took up goalkeeping at the age of 14 and was spotted by Chelsea. In 2003, she left Chelsea for Fulham, who had lost their professional status and Norwegian international goalkeeper Astrid Johannessen. Chamberlain played for Fulham in the UEFA Women's Cup, but moved on to Birmingham City at the end of the season. At Birmingham City Chamberlain provided competition for Jo Fletcher during the 2004–05 season. Chamberlain then played for Bristol Academy for two seasons, leaving to rejoin Chelsea in the 2007 close season. On 26 May 2010, she left Chelsea and signed for Canadian W-League Vancouver Whitecaps.

=== Bristol Academy ===
In October 2010, Chamberlain returned to Bristol Academy ahead of their inaugural FA WSL campaign. She helped Bristol reach the FA Women's Cup final, played in the UEFA Women's Champions League and was named in the WSL team of the season. In April 2012 she was appointed as one of eight digital media ambassadors, one from each team, who wear their Twitter account name on their shirt sleeves to raise the profile of the WSL.

=== Arsenal ===
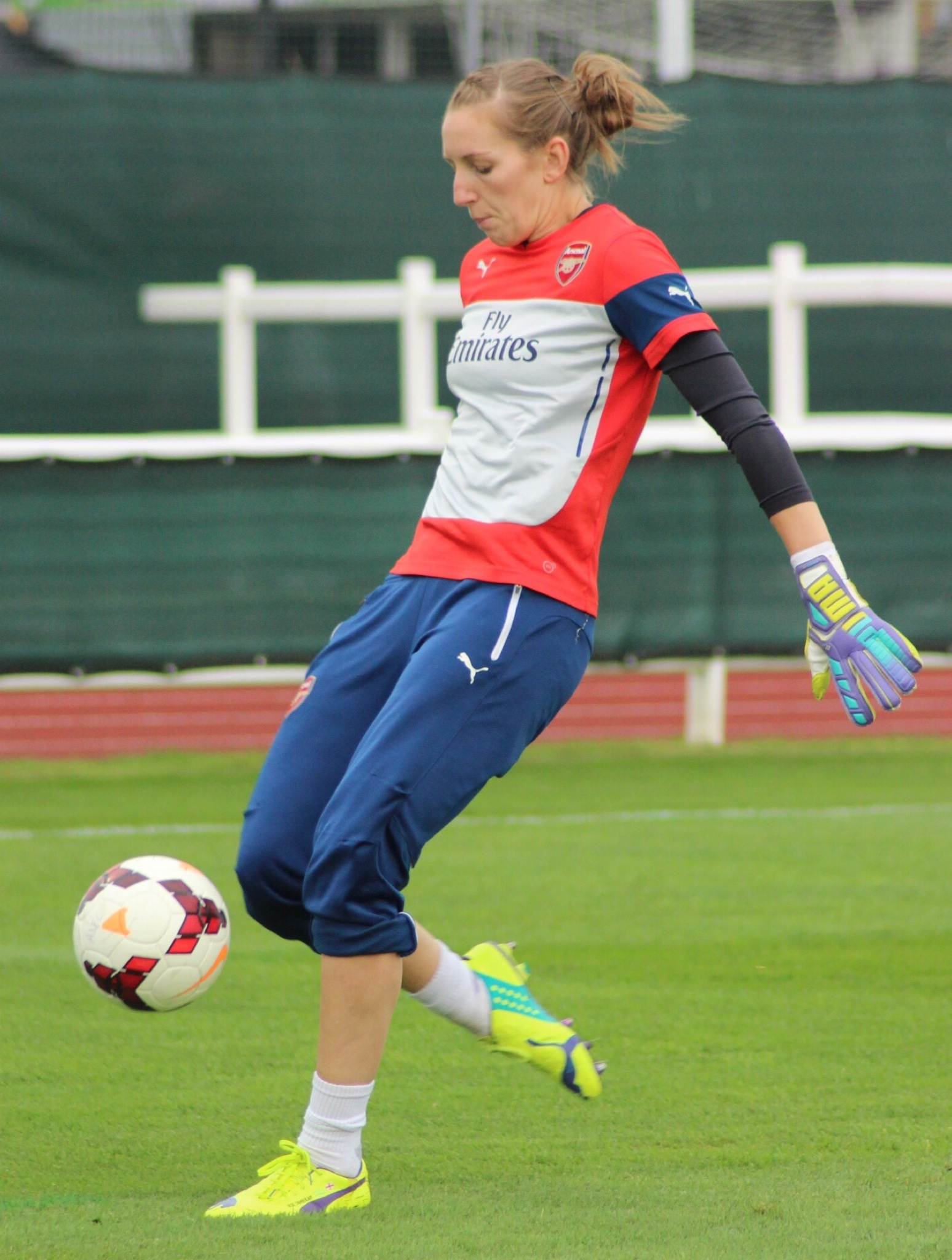
Chamberlain warming up for Arsenal in 2014.

In December 2013, Chamberlain quit Bristol Academy to sign a two-year contract with Arsenal, where she would rival the incumbent goalkeeper Emma Byrne for a starting position. Chamberlain had played every minute of every game in her three seasons back at Bristol, but craved a new challenge: "My ambition is to be England's number one so the added competition at Arsenal is what I need at this point in my career."

==== Loan to Notts County ====
On 9 July 2015, Chamberlain moved to Notts County on loan until the end of the season following injury to England teammate Carly Telford. She was ineligible for the 2015 FA Women's Cup Final and The Football Association refused Notts County's request for dispensation to sign another goalkeeper, so Telford played in the team's 1–0 defeat despite a shoulder injury.

=== Liverpool ===
Chamberlain failed to dislodge Byrne from Arsenal's starting line-up and was mainly used in cup matches. She was pushed further down the pecking order by the signing of Sari van Veenendaal. In December 2015, Liverpool announced their signing of Chamberlain on a one-year contract. When Liverpool decided not to renew 34-year-old Chamberlain's contract in May 2018, she criticised the club for a lack of ambition.

=== Manchester United ===
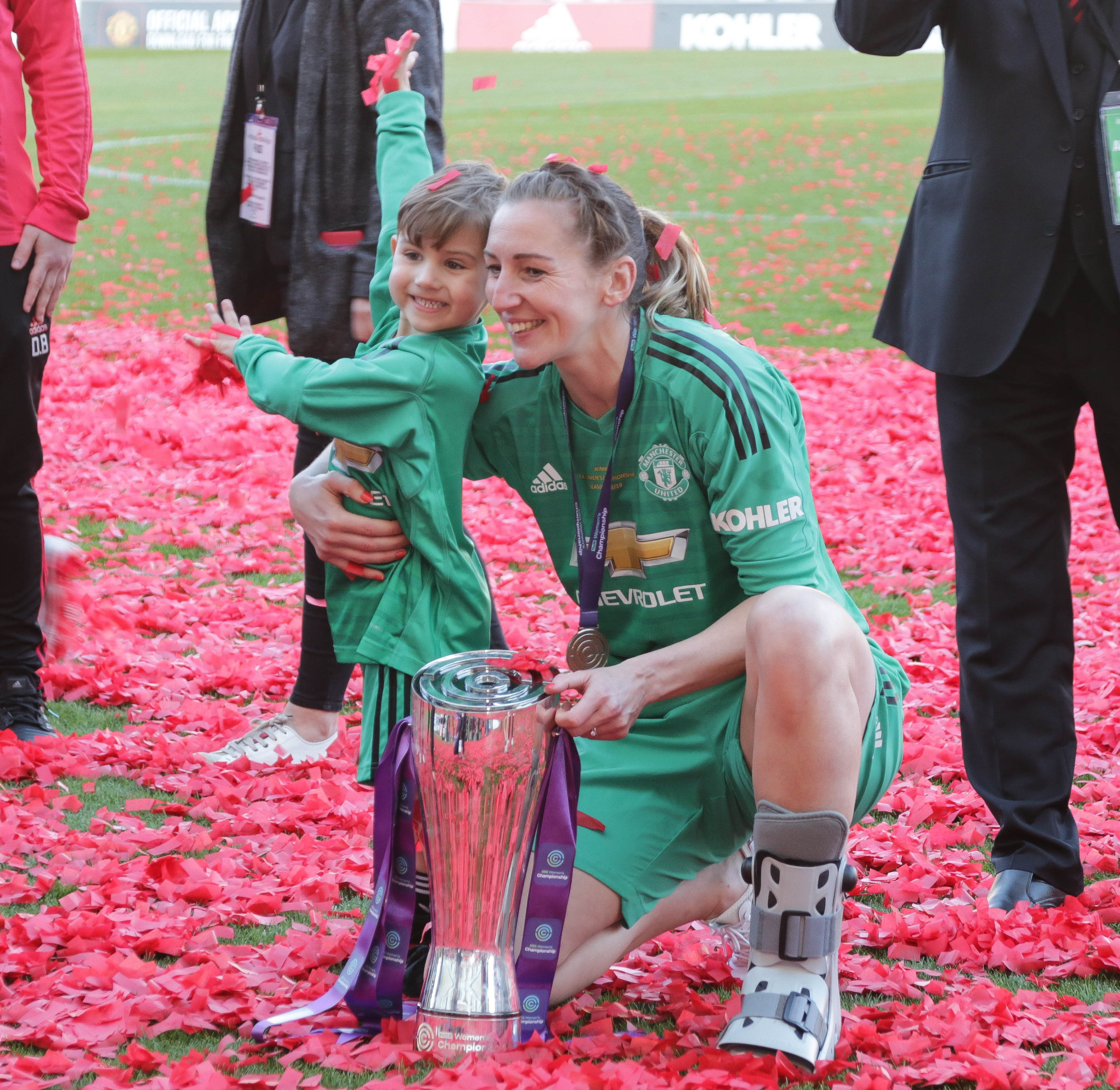
Chamberlain celebrating the Championship title in 2019.

On 13 July 2018, it was announced that Chamberlain would join Manchester United for their inaugural season playing in the FA Women's Championship. During a pre-season friendly against her former club Liverpool on 17 July 2018, Chamberlain suffered a suspected serious neck injury and was rushed to hospital; however, checks revealed that the injury was not as serious as first thought. She recovered in time for the start of the season and made her competitive debut for Manchester United in a 1–0 League Cup victory against Liverpool on 19 August. On 9 September, she made her Championship debut in a 12–0 win against Aston Villa. Chamberlain did not concede a league goal until United's sixth game, with Angela Addison's 82nd minute consolation goal in United's 4–1 win ending a streak of 531 minutes without conceding. United clinched the Championship title on 20 April 2019 with a 7–0 win over Crystal Palace with Chamberlain having played in all 18 league matches, conceding seven goals in that time. She subsequently missed the final two games of the season with a foot injury, collecting her winners medal on the last day of the season in an aircast. In May 2019, she was named PFA Community Champion of the Year for her work with the Manchester United Foundation.

For the 2019–20 season, Chamberlain took part in a reduced training programme while pregnant with her first child. She expressed a desire to return to the club full-time following her pregnancy. While sidelined, Chamberlain explored opportunities with the club's social media and press team, worked as club photographer and commentated on matches for the club's TV channel. She terminated her contract by mutual consent on 15 July 2020.

=== Retirement ===
On 4 September 2020, after fielding several offers and spending the 2020–21 preseason training with an unnamed WSL club, Chamberlain announced her retirement from professional football in order to spend more time with her family and focus on her master's in sporting directorship. She has continued to serve as a commentator alongside Pien Meulensteen on MUTV.

== International career ==
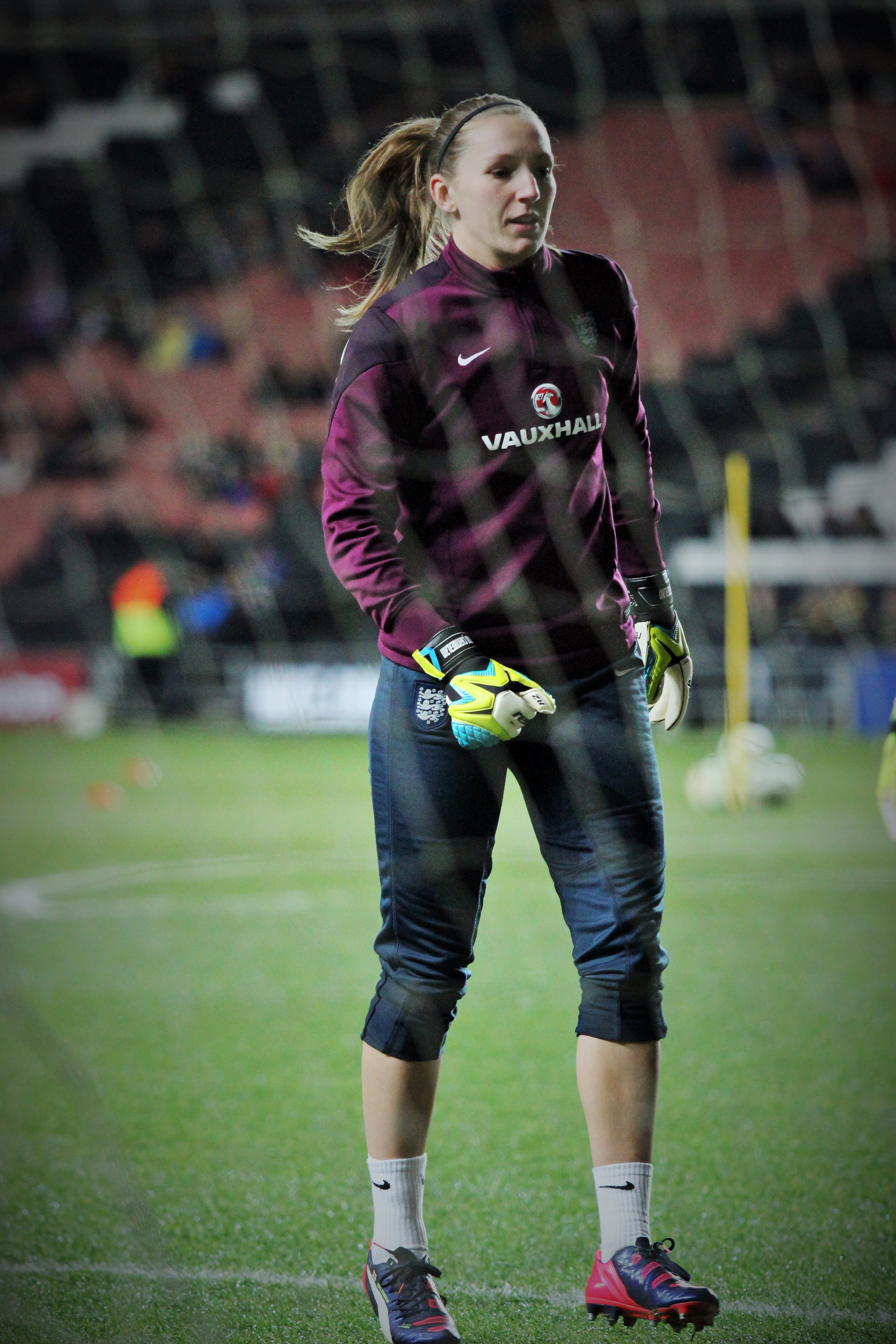
Chamberlain warming up for England in 2015.

Chamberlain progressed through the youth ranks with England before making her senior debut against the Netherlands in September 2004. She won her second cap in a record 13–0 win against Hungary.

Chamberlain was named in England's squad for the 2007 World Cup. In May 2009, Chamberlain was one of the first 17 female players to be given central contracts by The Football Association. She went to UEFA Women's Euro 2009 as an understudy to first-choice Rachel Brown.

When Brown was controversially sent-off in a World Cup qualifying play-off in Switzerland, Chamberlain came on as her replacement. By the 2011 World Cup American-born Karen Bardsley had taken over the England team's first-choice goalkeeping position, with Brown and Chamberlain as back-ups. Bardsley also retained the number one role at UEFA Women's Euro 2013.

In May 2015, national coach Mark Sampson named Chamberlain in his final squad for the 2015 FIFA Women's World Cup, to be hosted in Canada. On 27 June 2015, she replaced fellow goalkeeper Bardsley in the 52nd minute of England's 2–1 quarter-final win over hosts Canada, as her country reached the semi-finals of the World Cup for the first time in their history. Bardsley had suffered a swollen eye after an allergic reaction to the rubber crumb on the controversial artificial turf pitch, but was restored to the team for England's semi-final defeat by Japan.

At UEFA Women's Euro 2017, Chamberlain was again named as Bardsley's understudy. She played 90 minutes in a dead rubber group win over Portugal and again entered play as a quarter-final substitute following another injury to Bardsley. She was selected for the semi-final against hosts the Netherlands but conceded three unanswered goals as England exited the competition. At the 2018 SheBelieves Cup Chamberlain won her 50th England cap.

Chamberlain was allotted 157 when the FA announced their legacy numbers scheme to honour the 50th anniversary of England’s inaugural international.

== Personal life ==
Chamberlain joined the National Player Development Centre at Loughborough University when she was 18, training every day while earning a degree in sports science and a master's degree in sports nutrition. She was later employed as a lecturer / coach by South Gloucestershire and Stroud College in Bristol.

In 2015, Chamberlain married Leigh Moore, a former media assistant at the FA. Moore was left in charge of planning the wedding while Chamberlain was away at the 2015 FIFA Women's World Cup. In July 2019, the couple announced they were expecting their first child. Emilia Francesca Moore was born on 31 January 2020.

In July 2018, Chamberlain became a member of pledge-based charity Common Goal. In July 2020, Chamberlain became a club ambassador for Hashtag United F.C. following the club's creation of a fourth division women's team ahead of the 2020–21 season.

== Career statistics ==
=== Club ===
As of match played 11 May 2019

Appearances and goals by club, season and competition
Club	Season	League			FA Cup (Note: Includes the Women's FA Cup)		League Cup (Note: Includes the WPL Cup and WSL Cup/Women's League Cup)		Europe (Note: Includes the UEFA Women's Champions League)		Total	
Club	Season	Division	Apps	Goals	Apps	Goals	Apps	Goals	Apps	Goals	Apps	Goals
Birmingham City	2004–05	WPL National	2	0	—		0	0	—		2	0
Bristol Academy	2005–06	WPL National	18	0	—		3	0	—		21	0
Bristol Academy	2006–07	WPL National	20	0	—		2	0	—		22	0
Bristol Academy	Total		38	0	—		5	0	—		43	0
Chelsea	2007–08	WPL National	21	0	—		3	0	—		24	0
Chelsea	2008–09	WPL National	14	0	—		4	0	—		18	0
Chelsea	2009–10	WPL National	20	0	—		4	0	—		24	0
Chelsea	Total		55	0	—		11	0	—		66	0
Vancouver Whitecaps	2010	USL W-League	8	0	—		—		—		8	0
Bristol Academy	2011	WSL	14	0	4	0	1	0	2	0	19	0
Bristol Academy	2012	WSL	14	0	3	0	4	0	—		23	0
Bristol Academy	2013	WSL	14	0	2	0	3	0	—		19	0
Bristol Academy	Total		42	0	9	0	8	0	2	0	61	0
Arsenal	2014	WSL 1	1	0	3	0	2	0	0	0	6	0
Arsenal	2015	WSL 1	1	0	1	0	0	0	—		2	0
Arsenal	Total		2	0	4	0	2	0	0	0	8	0
Notts County (loan)	2015	WSL 1	2	0	0	0	6	0	—		8	0
Liverpool	2016	WSL 1	16	0	1	0	2	0	—		19	0
Liverpool	2017	WSL 1	8	0	1	0	0	0	—		9	0
Liverpool	2017–18	WSL 1	15	0	1	0	4	0	—		20	0
Liverpool	Total		39	0	3	0	6	0	—		48	0
Manchester United	2018–19	Championship	18	0	3	0	6	0	—		27	0
Manchester United	2019–20	WSL	0	0	0	0	0	0	—		0	0
Career total			206	0	19	0	44	0	2	0	271	0

== Honours ==
Arsenal

- FA Women's Cup: 2013–14

Manchester United

- FA Women's Championship: 2018–19

England

- Cyprus Cup: 2009, 2013, 2015
- UEFA Women's Championship runner-up: 2009
- FIFA Women's World Cup third place: 2015

Individual

- PFA FA WSL 1 Team of the Year: 2011, 2013–14
