= Danielle Gibbons =

English footballer

Personal information
- Full name: Danielle Michelle Taylor-Gibbons
- Date of birth: 31 July 1992 (age 34)
- Place of birth: Chorley, England
- Height: 1.78 m (5 ft 10 in)
- Position: Goalkeeper

Youth career
- Euxton Girls

Senior career*
Years	Team	Apps	(Gls)
2008–2011	Preston North End	25	(0)
2011–2017	Liverpool	11	(0)
2017–2018	Sheffield	17	(0)
2018–2019	Blackburn Rovers	12	(0)

International career^{‡}
2010–2011	England U-19	0	(0)
Medal record
Women's football
Representing Great Britain
Summer Universiade
Gold medal – first place	2013 Kazan	Team
- * Club domestic league appearances and goals as of 15:50, 16 July 2019 (UTC) ‡ National team caps and goals as of 13:21, 17 February 2019 (UTC)

Danielle Michelle Taylor-Gibbons (née Danielle Michelle Gibbons; born 31 July 1992) is an English footballer who played as a goalkeeper for Preston North End (now known as AFC Fylde), Liverpool, and Blackburn Rovers.

== Club career ==
Gibbons was encouraged to play football as a child by her parents, playing for Euxton Girls' Team from the age of eight. She played as a defender until stepping in as goalkeeper when her team was struggling to fill the position.

=== Preston North End ===
Gibbons began her career playing for Preston North End (now affiliated with AFC Fylde, competing under the name AFC Fylde Women).

=== Liverpool ===
Gibbons was signed by Liverpool ahead of the inaugural 2011 season of the FA Women's Super League. During her time at the club, she won the Women's Super League twice and made appearances in the Women's Champions League. In 2015, the club presented a Special Recognition award to Gibbons after she successfully returned to football following surgery to remove a brain tumour in the mid-season break.

Upon leaving Liverpool, she was the club's longest-serving player.

=== Sheffield ===
In 2017, Gibbons signed with Women's Championship (now known as WSL2) team Sheffield F.C. During her time at the club, she worked part-time as a personal trainer. Following the 2017–18 season, Sheffield were forced to withdraw from the league, citing financial situations.

=== Blackburn Rovers ===
In 2018, she signed for Blackburn Rovers. With the club, she won the Women's National League North, Women's National League Cup, and Lancashire FA Women's Challenge Cup. She left the club and retired from football in July 2019.

== International career ==
Gibbons represented England at U-19 and U-23 level and was called up to train with the senior squad. She also represented Great Britain at the 2013 Summer Universiade.

== Personal life ==
In 2013, Gibbons was diagnosed with an acoustic neuroma (a low-grade benign brain tumour); the tumour was growing on her vestibulocochlear nerve, a nerve which helps with control and balance. In 2015, Gibbons required surgery to remove the tumour, which made her deaf in her left ear. Just three months after her surgery, injury to Liverpool's first choice goalkeeper required Gibbons to play in two games, including a Champions League match away against Brescia. Since her surgery, Gibbons has suffered from severe tinnitus.

Gibbons works for the civil service. In 2023, she married her partner, Laura. She is an ambassador for BANA, a charity supporting people affected by acoustic neuroma. In 2025, she released a book, Back in the Game: My Brain Tumour Diaries, about her diagnosis, treatment and recovery.

== Honours ==
=== Liverpool ===
- FA WSL: 2013, 2014

=== Blackburn Rovers ===
- Women's National League North: 2018–19
- FA Women's National League Cup: 2018–19
- Lancashire FA Women's Challenge Cup: 2018–19
