= Becky Flaherty =

Scottish footballer (born 1998)

Personal information
- Full name: Rebecca Flaherty
- Date of birth: 6 March 1998 (age 28)
- Place of birth: Scotland
- Height: 1.69 m (5 ft 7 in)
- Position: Goalkeeper

Team information
- Current team: Brighouse Town
- Number: 1

Senior career*
Years	Team	Apps	(Gls)
2013	Buchan	16	(0)
2017–2018	Liverpool	3	(0)
2018–2019	Everton	0	(0)
2019–2021	Sheffield United	12	(0)
2021	Blackburn Rovers	1	(0)
2021-2022	Huddersfield Town	9	(0)
2022-	Brighouse Town	9	(0)

International career^{‡}
2013	Scotland U17	9	(0)
2014–2017	Scotland U19	17	(0)
2019–	Northern Ireland	7	(0)
- * Club domestic league appearances and goals as of 15 July 2020 ‡ National team caps and goals as of 22:55, 13 July 2022 (UTC)

Rebecca "Becky" Flaherty (born 6 March 1998) is a professional footballer who plays as a goalkeeper for FA Women's National League North club Brighouse Town AFC Women and the Northern Ireland national team.

== Club career ==
On 7 February 2018, Flaherty made her full debut for Liverpool, playing the 90 minutes in a 3–0 loss to Arsenal in the 2017–18 season.

On 1 August 2019, Flaherty completed a move to FA Women's Championship club Sheffield United.

On 29 July 2021, Huddersfield Town Women announced that Flaherty had joined the club for the 2021–22 season following a trial period against Celtic F.C. Women & Fleetwood Town Wrens.

== International career ==
Flaherty was capped at youth level by Scotland but switched allegiances to Northern Ireland at senior level. In January 2019, Flaherty received her first call up to Northern Ireland's training camp. Flaherty made her senior international debut on 3 March 2019, starting in a 4–0 win over Kazakhstan in the Alanya Gold City Women's Cup.

Flaherty was part of the squad that was called up to the UEFA Women's Euro 2022.
