= Rinsola Babajide =

Nigerian footballer (born 1998)

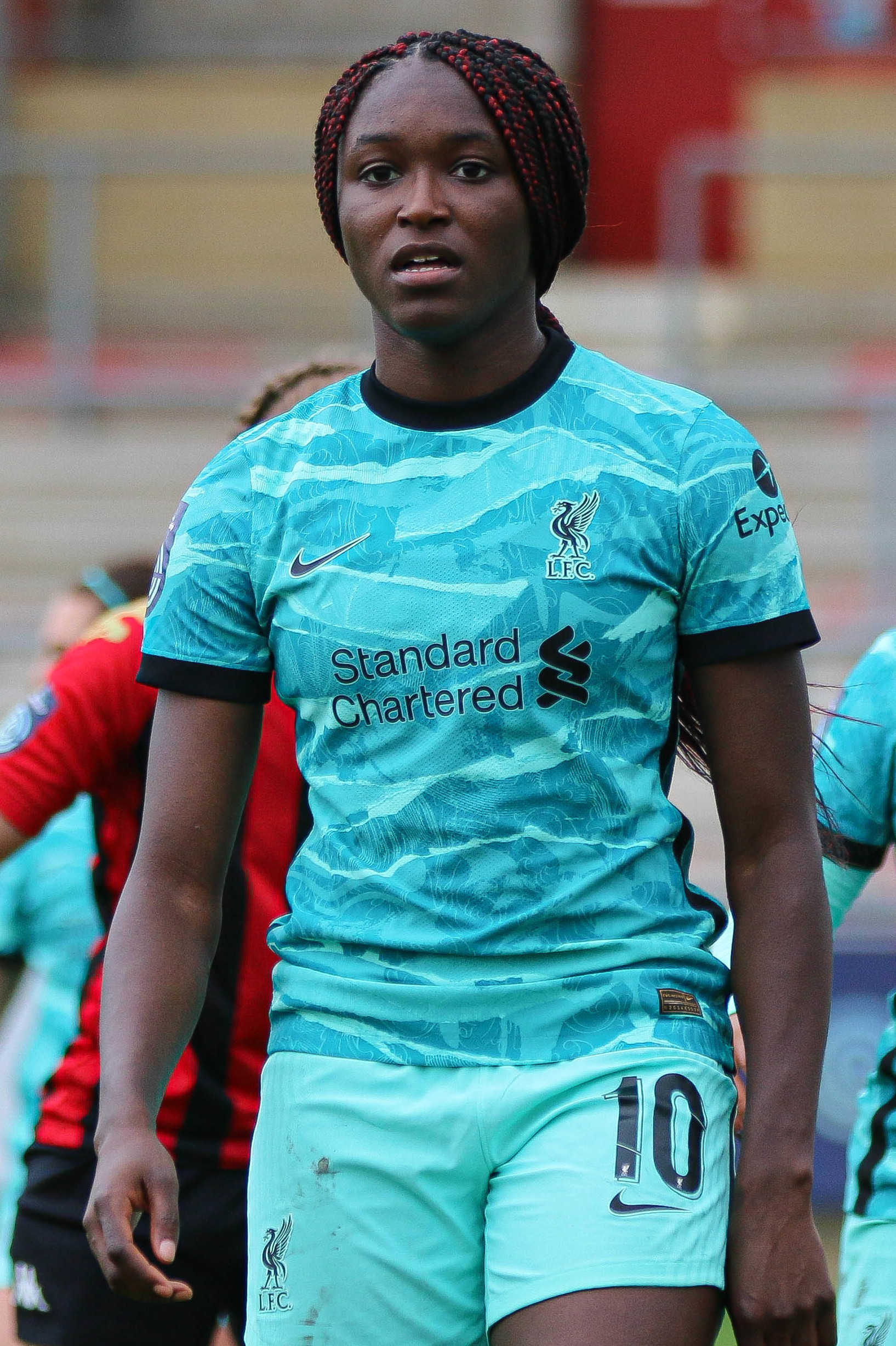
- Babajide with Liverpool in 2020

Personal information
- Full name: Omorinsola Omowunmi Ajike Babajide
- Date of birth: 17 June 1998 (age 28)
- Place of birth: London, England
- Height: 1.74 m (5 ft 9 in)
- Position: Forward

Team information
- Current team: Roma
- Number: 30

Senior career*
| Years | Team | Apps | (Gls) |
| 2014–2015 | Crystal Palace | 9 | (2) |
| 2015–2016 | Millwall Lionesses | 31 | (7) |
| 2017–2018 | Watford | 15 | (3) |
| 2018–2022 | Liverpool | 45 | (10) |
| 2021–2022 | → Brighton & Hove Albion (loan) | 3 | (0) |
| 2022–2023 | Real Betis | 38 | (9) |
| 2023–2025 | UDG Tenerife | 41 | (7) |
| 2025– | Roma | 11 | (2) |

International career^{‡}
| 2016–2017 | England U19 | 9 | (0) |
| 2017–2018 | England U20 | 6 | (0) |
| 2019 | England U21 | 8 | (2) |
| 2023– | Nigeria | 21 | (2) |
- * Club domestic league appearances and goals as of 15 August 2026 ‡ National team caps and goals as of 15 August 2026

Omorinsola Omowunmi Ajike Babajide OON (Yoruba: [ɔ.mɔ.ɾĩ.sɔ.lá ɔ.mɔ.wũ.mi à.d͡ʒí.kɛ bà.bà.d͡ʒí.dɛ]; born 17 June 1998), known as Rinsola Babajide, is a professional footballer who plays as a winger for Serie A Femminile club Roma. Born in England, she represented her country of birth as a youth international up to under-21 level, before switching allegiance to Nigeria and making her senior debut in October 2023.

She previously played for Liverpool, Millwall Lionesses, Watford and Brighton & Hove Albion.

== Club career ==
=== Crystal Palace ===
Rinsola Babajide began her career at Crystal Palace and played for the club during the 2014–15 season. She made nine appearances and scored twice and made a further two appearances for the reserve team.

She made her senior debut for the club during the opening game of the season, a 2–0 win against Denham United on 24 August 2014. She scored her first goal for Crystal Palace during a 3–3 draw against Cambridge United on 5 October 2014.

=== Millwall Lionesses ===
She joined Millwall Lionesses from Crystal Palace in January 2015, but made her professional debut on March 18 against the London Bees in a FA WSL match which ended in a draw.

=== Watford ===
In February 2017, Babajide completed a transfer to Watford Ladies. She scored her first competitive goal for the club in a 3–2 loss to London Bees in a FA WSL Spring Series fixture. Babajide finished as Watford's joint top scorer in the 2017 Spring Series, with three goals.

=== Liverpool ===
Her transfer to Liverpool was announced on 25 January 2018. Babajide was part of the squad that saw Liverpool relegated to the Championship in 2020.

Babajide was Liverpool's second highest goal scorer in the 2018/19 WSL season with two campaign goals.

Babajide was then Liverpool's joint-second WSL goal scorer in the 2019/20 season with one single league goal. She didn't feature for Liverpool in the second half of the 2020/21 Championship season after refusing to train with the first team squad and was then subsequently moved down into the age group development squad away from the first team.

=== Brighton & Hove Albion ===
On 26 July 2021, Brighton & Hove Albion Women Football Club announced the signing of Rinsola on a season-long loan deal from Liverpool Women.

=== Real Betis (loan) and UDG Tenerife ===
On 3 July 2023, after an 18-month spell with Real Betis, Babajide joined fellow Liga F side UDG Tenerife on a two-year deal.

=== AS Roma ===
On 14 July 2025, Babajide was announced at Roma on a two year contract.

== International career ==
=== England ===
In August 2018, Babajide was part of the England U20s squad that claimed bronze at the 2018 FIFA U-20 Women's World Cup. In September 2020 she was included in a training camp for the England senior team.

=== Nigeria ===
Due to her Nigerian parents, Babajide was also eligible to represent Nigeria. She received her first call up in October 2023 and made her debut on 25 October 2023, starting in a 1–1 draw with Ethiopia during 2024 Olympic qualifying.

On 6 July 2025, she scored and assisted once in Nigeria v. Tunisia in the 2024 TotalEnergies Women's Africa Cup of Nations, contributing to their 3-0 victory.

At the 2026 Women's Africa Cup of Nations (WAFCON), Babajide was handed her first start of the tournament in Nigeria's final Group C fixture against Egypt on 5 August 2026. She produced a Player of the Match performance, providing two assists—setting up Gift Monday in the 44th minute and Uchenna Kanu in the 57th minute—to help the Super Falcons win 6–2 and qualify for the quarter-finals.

== Career statistics ==
=== Club ===
As of match played 11 May 2019

Appearances and goals by club, season and competition
| Club | Season | League | | | League Cup (Note: Includes the FA WSL Cup) | | FA Cup (Note: Includes the FA Women's Cup) | | Continental (Note: Includes the UEFA Women's Champions League) | | Total | |
| Club | Season | Division | Apps | Goals | Apps | Goals | Apps | Goals | Apps | Goals | Apps | Goals |
|---|---|---|---|---|---|---|---|---|---|---|---|---|
| Millwall Lionesses | 2015 | FA WSL 2 | 17 | 3 | 5 | 2 | 1 | 0 | — | | 23 | 5 |
| Millwall Lionesses | 2016 | FA WSL 2 | 14 | 4 | 1 | 0 | 2 | 0 | — | | 17 | 4 |
| Millwall Lionesses | Total | | 31 | 7 | 6 | 2 | 3 | 0 | 0 | 0 | 40 | 9 |
| Watford | 2017 | FA WSL 2 | 9 | 3 | — | | 0 | 0 | — | | 9 | 3 |
| Watford | 2017–18 | FA WSL 2 | 6 | 0 | 4 | 0 | 0 | 0 | — | | 10 | 0 |
| Watford | Total | | 15 | 3 | 4 | 0 | 0 | 0 | 0 | 0 | 19 | 3 |
| Liverpool | 2017–18 | FA WSL | 4 | 0 | 0 | 0 | 0 | 0 | — | | 4 | 0 |
| Liverpool | 2018–19 | FA WSL | 17 | 4 | 1 | 1 | 0 | 0 | — | | 18 | 5 |
| Liverpool | Total | | 21 | 4 | 1 | 1 | 0 | 0 | 0 | 0 | 22 | 5 |
| Career total | | | 67 | 14 | 11 | 3 | 3 | 0 | 0 | 0 | 81 | 17 |

== Honours ==
England U20s

- FIFA U-20 Women's World Cup third place: 2018

Roma

- Coppa Italia: 2025–26

Nigeria

- Women's Africa Cup of Nations: 2024

Individual

- Liverpool Women's Player of the Season Award (2019–20)
