= Jessica Clarke (footballer) =

English footballer

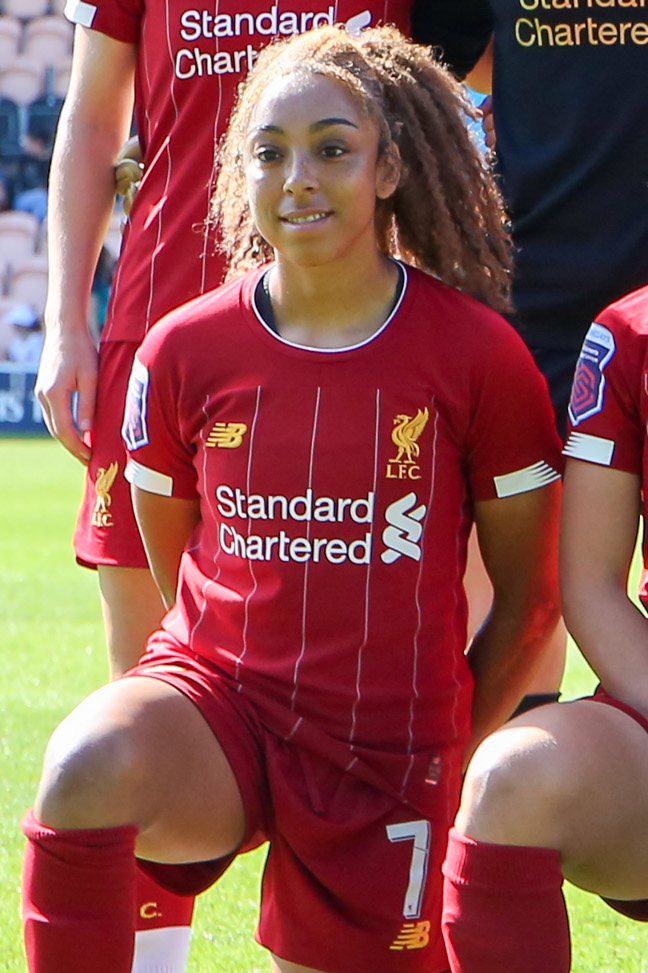
- Clarke playing for Liverpool in 2019

Personal information
- Full name: Jessica Anne Clarke
- Date of birth: 5 May 1989 (age 37)
- Place of birth: Leeds, England
- Height: 1.63 m (5 ft 4 in)
- Positions: Winger; forward

Youth career
- –2004: Leeds Carnegie Ladies

Senior career*
Years	Team	Apps	(Gls)
2004–2010	Leeds Carnegie Ladies		
2010–2017	Notts County	82	(24)
2017–2021	Liverpool	49	(8)
2021–2022	Sheffield United	13	(2)
2022–2023	Durham	30	(3)

International career
2008	England U19	7	(0)
2009–2015	England	51	(11)
- * Club domestic league appearances and goals

Jessica Anne Clarke (born 5 May 1989) is an English former professional footballer who played as a winger or forward. After beginning her career with hometown team Leeds United (known as Leeds Carnegie between 2008 and 2010), Clarke joined Lincoln Ladies in 2010 and remained with the club when it re-branded as Notts County four years later. After six seasons at Notts County, Clarke signed for league rivals Liverpool in April 2017. Since making her senior England debut in 2009, Clarke has won over 50 caps. She has represented her country at two editions of the UEFA Women's Championship and at the 2011 FIFA Women's World Cup.

== Club career ==
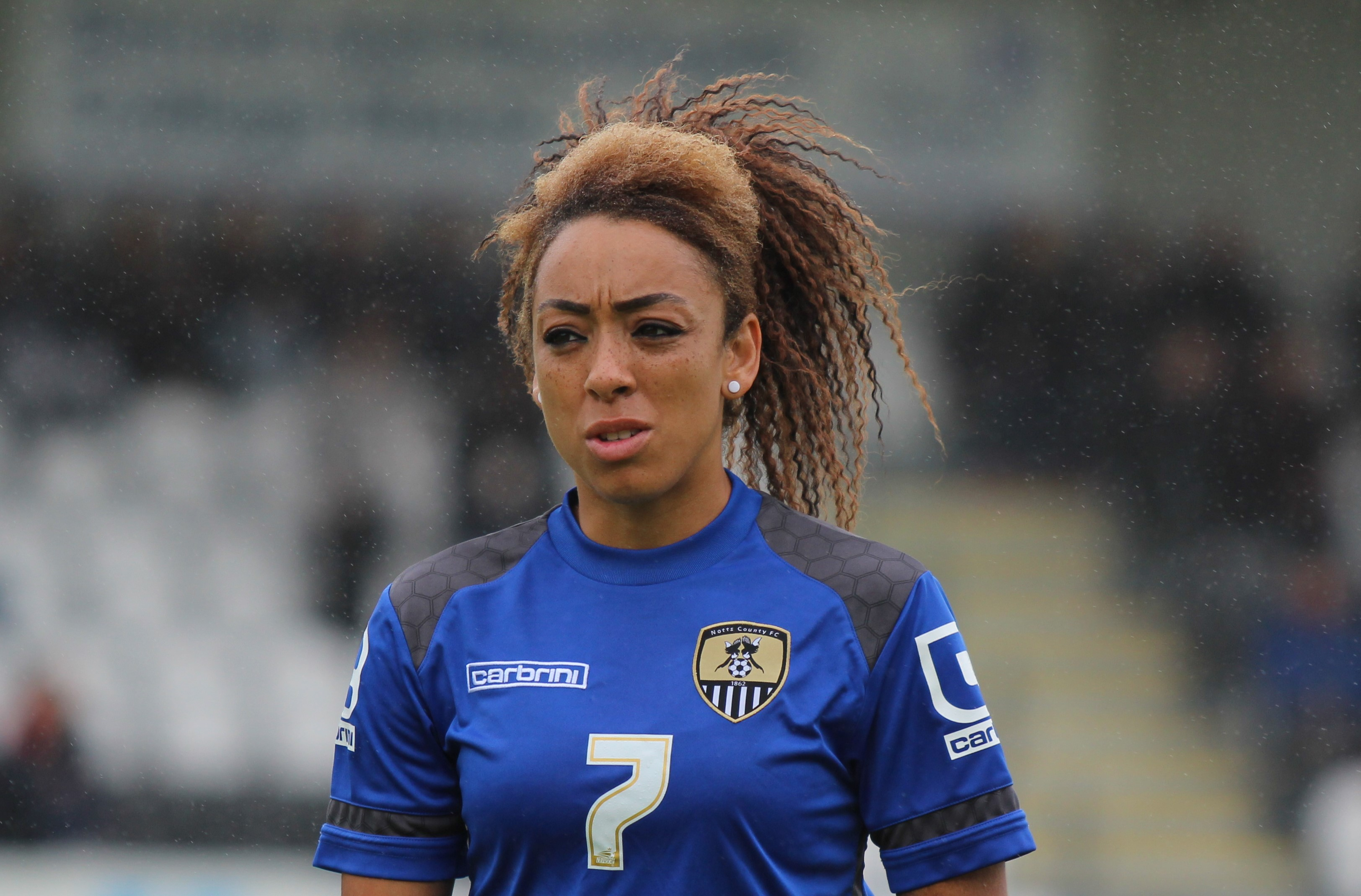
Playing for Notts County in July 2015

Clarke joined Leeds at Under-14 level, progressing through the youth teams to make the senior squad. At the age of 16, Clarke started the 2006 FA Women's Cup final, but conceded a penalty in Leeds' 5–0 defeat by Arsenal. In 2006–07, Leeds reached the final of the FA Women's Premier League Cup. Despite a much improved performance, including a substitute cameo from Clarke, Leeds lost out to an injury–time strike from Arsenal's Jayne Ludlow.

In Leeds' third major final in as many years, Clarke scored a consolation goal in the 2008 FA Women's Cup final – a 4–1 loss to Arsenal. At the fourth time of asking, Clarke started a 3–1 Premier League Cup final win over Everton on 11 February 2010, to help Leeds win their first major silverware.

She signed for FA WSL club Lincoln Ladies alongside several Leeds teammates in August 2010. Lincoln's capture of the "pacy winger" was seen as a major signing for the club.

At the end of the WSL season Clarke joined FA Women's Premier League Northern Division strugglers Leeds City Vixens on loan.

It was announced that Lincoln Ladies FC was to be started as a new football club for the 2014 FA WSL season and would be crossing the border to become Notts County Ladies. Clarke stayed with the team for the move and was a vital player in their season. Scoring many goals during the season and dominating play in her new role as a striker earned Clarke a nomination for FA Women's Players' Player of the Season.

On 25 May 2021, she was released from Liverpool after making 68 appearances overall.

She retired from professional playing following a spell with Durham.

== International career ==
Clarke represented England at Under-15, Under-17 and Under-19 level. At the 2008 FIFA U-20 Women's World Cup in Chile, Clarke's wing–play was a key feature of England's run to the quarter-final stage. A FIFA.com article hailed Clarke as "the wizard of the dribble." She made her senior debut in March 2009, against South Africa in the Cyprus Cup, as a second-half substitute for Karen Carney. Clarke then scored in only her second appearance, the third goal in a 3–0 win over Scotland.

In August 2009 she was named in coach Hope Powell's squad for Euro 2009. Clarke made her first competitive start in the semi-final win over the Netherlands, as manager Hope Powell utilised the 20-year–old's pace and energy to tire the Dutch full–backs, before introducing substitute Karen Carney to decisive effect.

Clarke continued to be selected during England's 2011 FIFA World Cup qualification campaign, contributing two goals in an 8–0 win over Malta. In a World Cup warm–up friendly against the United States, Clarke opened the scoring in England's 2–1 win at Brisbane Road. June 2012 saw Clarke named as one of four reserves to the 18-player Great Britain squad for the 2012 London Olympics. Her absence from the main squad was attributed to injury and loss of form.

After attending UEFA Women's Euro 2013 as a squad player, Clarke was overlooked by new head coach Mark Sampson for the first six months of his reign before being recalled in May 2014. Clarke was disappointed to be left out of England's squad for the 2015 FIFA Women's World Cup, where they finished third. But she vowed to bounce back: "As an athlete you have to take those knocks. It is how you come back from it and learn from it."

Clarke was allotted 168 when the FA announced their legacy numbers scheme to honour the 50th anniversary of England’s inaugural international.

== Personal life ==
In addition to playing for Leeds Carnegie Ladies, in September 2009 Clarke enrolled at Leeds Metropolitan University as a student, along with teammates Carly Telford and Sue Smith. She had previously attended the FA Player Development Centre at Loughborough University. Clarke went to Grimes Dyke Primary School followed by John Smeaton High School in Leeds and was brought up by her single mother, Carol Stapleton.

== Career statistics ==
Scores and results list England's goal tally first.

#	Date	Venue	Opponent	Result	Competition	Scored
1	10 March 2009	Larnaca	Scotland	3–0	Cyprus Cup	1
3	25 October 2009	Bloomfield Road, Blackpool	Malta	8–0	2011 FIFA World Cup Qual.	2
4	20 May 2010	Centenary Stadium, Ta' Qali	Malta	6–0	2011 FIFA World Cup Qual.	1
5	29 July 2010	Bescot Stadium, Walsall	Turkey	3–0	2011 FIFA World Cup Qual.	1
6	2 April 2011	Brisbane Road, London	United States	2–1	Friendly	1
7	1 July 2011	Rudolf-Harbig-Stadion, Dresden	New Zealand	2–1	2011 FIFA Women's World Cup	1
8	23 November 2011	Keepmoat Stadium, Doncaster	Serbia	2–0	2013 UEFA Championship Qual.	1
9	31 March 2012	Sajmište, Vrbovec	Croatia	6–0	2013 UEFA Championship Qual.	1
10	6 March 2013	GSP Stadium, Nicosia, Cyprus	Italy	4–2	2013 Cyprus Cup	1
11	4 March 2015	GSZ Stadium, Larnaca, Cyprus	Finland	3–1	2015 Cyprus Cup	1
