= 2026–27 Liverpool F.C. Women season =

38th season in existence of Liverpool F.C. Women

Liverpool
2026–27 season
- Owner: Fenway Sports Group (62%); 1892 Holdings (38%)
- Chairman: Tom Werner
- Head coach: Gareth Taylor
- Stadium: St Helens Stadium; Anfield (selected home matches)
- Highest home attendance: 9,642 v. Everton; Super League, 27 September 2026
- Lowest home attendance: 1,685 v. Aston Villa; Players Cup, 11 November 2026
- Average home league attendance: 5,968
- Biggest win: 4–0 v. Charlton Athletic (A); Super League, 6 September 2026
- Biggest defeat: 1–4 v. West Ham United (A); Super League, 1 November 2026
Home colours	Away colours	Third colours

The 2026–27 season is Liverpool Football Club Women's 38th season in their history and their fourth consecutive season in the top flight of English football. In addition to the Super League, the club is also participating in the FA Cup and the Players Cup.

== Squad ==
As of 21 November 2026

No.	Player	Nationality	Date of birth (age)	Signed from	Apps	Goals	Assists
Goalkeepers
1	Rachael Laws	(England)	5 November 1990 (age 36)	(England) Reading	107	0	0
12	Khiara Keating	(England)	27 June 2004 (age 22)	(England) Manchester City	12	0	0
22	Faye Kirby	(England)	5 April 2004 (age 22)	(England) Everton	20	0	0
Defenders
2	Lucy Parry	(England)	7 May 2004 (age 22)	(England) LFCW Academy	51	1	0
4	Grace Fisk (captain)	(England)	5 January 1998 (age 28)	(England) West Ham United	86	5	3
16	Lily Woodham	(Wales)	3 September 2000 (age 26)	(United States) Seattle Reign	24	0	8
17	Jenna Clark	(Scotland)	29 September 2001 (age 25)	(Scotland) Glasgow City	92	4	2
23	Sara Agrež	(Slovenia)	9 December 2000 (age 25)	(Germany) 1. FC Köln	9	0	0
25	Alice Bergström	(Sweden)	3 February 2003 (age 23)	(Sweden) BK Häcken	27	4	1
28	Mari Ward	(England)	3 January 2006 (age 20)	(England) Bristol City	6	0	0
29	Alejandra Bernabé	(Spain)	12 November 2001 (age 25)	(England) Chelsea	33	0	2
Midfielders
6	Natalia Ramos	(Spain)	10 February 1999 (age 27)	(Spain) Tenerife	15	3	2
8	Fūka Nagano	(Japan)	9 March 1999 (age 27)	(United States) North Carolina Courage	107	1	10
14	Marie Höbinger	(Austria)	1 July 2001 (age 25)	(Switzerland) Zürich	71	14	12
18	Ceri Holland	(Wales)	12 December 1997 (age 28)	(United States) Kansas Jayhawks	135	14	17
19	Kirsty Maclean	(Scotland)	12 April 2005 (age 21)	(Scotland) Rangers	33	0	1
24	Sam Kerr	(Scotland)	17 April 1999 (age 27)	(Germany) Bayern Munich	35	2	1
26	Mao Itamura	(Japan)	6 August 2006 (age 20)	(Netherlands) Feyenoord	8	0	1
36	Zara Shaw	(England)	6 June 2007 (age 19)	(England) LFCW Academy	16	4	1
Forwards
7	Cornelia Kapocs	(Sweden)	13 July 2000 (age 26)	(Sweden) Linköping	69	13	7
9	Vivien Endemann	(Germany)	7 August 2001 (age 25)	(Germany) VfL Wolfsburg	11	3	3
10	Sophie Román Haug	(Norway)	4 June 1999 (age 27)	(Italy) Roma	52	14	7
11	Beata Olsson	(Sweden)	31 January 2001 (age 25)	(Sweden) Kristianstads DFF	38	19	3
13	Mia Enderby	(England)	31 May 2005 (age 21)	(England) Sheffield United	78	14	7
21	Anna Jøsendal	(Norway)	29 April 2001 (age 25)	(Sweden) Hammarby	4	0	0
27	Aurélie Csillag	(Switzerland)	24 January 2003 (age 23)	(Germany) SC Freiburg	17	2	1
Out on loan
6	Denise O'Sullivan	(Republic of Ireland)	4 February 1994 (age 32)	(United States) North Carolina Courage	13	2	0
12	Rafaela Borggräfe	(Germany)	5 March 2000 (age 26)	(Germany) SC Freiburg	4	0	0

=== New contracts ===
Date	Pos.	No.	Player	Date until	Ref.
23 July 2026	DF	2	(England) Lucy Parry	Undisclosed	
7 August 2026	FW	57	(Scotland) Neve McDonald	Undisclosed (Note: First professional contract.)	
7 November 2026	DF	4	(England) Grace Fisk	Undisclosed	

== Transfers ==
=== In ===
Date	Pos.	No.	Player	From	Fee	Ref.
1 July 2026	FW	9	(Germany) Vivien Endemann	(Germany) VfL Wolfsburg	Free transfer	
1 July 2026	DF	23	(Slovenia) Sara Agrež	(Germany) 1. FC Köln	Free transfer	
2 July 2026	DF	24	(England) Mari Ward	(England) Bristol City	Free transfer	
13 July 2026	GK	12	(England) Khiara Keating	(England) Manchester City	Free transfer	
20 July 2026	FW	26	(Japan) Mao Itamura	(Netherlands) Feyenoord	Undisclosed	
6 August 2026	MF	6	(Spain) Natalia Ramos	(Spain) Tenerife	£257,000	
▼ Spending: £257,000 + Undisclosed fees

=== Out ===
Date	Pos.	No.	Player	To	Fee	Ref.
1 July 2026	DF	3	(England) Gemma Evans	(England) Newcastle United	Free transfer	
1 July 2026	DF	23	(England) Gemma Bonner	(United States) Denver Summit	Free transfer	
28 July 2026	FW	9	(Republic of Ireland) Leanne Kiernan	(England) Newcastle United	Undisclosed	
13 August 2026	DF	34	(England) Hannah Silcock	(England) Everton	Undisclosed	
14 August 2026	MF	15	(Denmark) Sofie Lundgaard	(Germany) Eintracht Frankfurt	Undisclosed	
▲ Income: £0 + Undisclosed fees

=== Loans in ===
Date	Pos.	No.	Player	From	Date until	Ref.
No loans in

=== Loans out ===
Date	Pos.	No.	Player	To	Date until	Ref.
7 July 2026	GK	12	(Germany) Rafaela Borggräfe	(Germany) Bayer Leverkusen	30 June 2027	
14 July 2026	MF	6	(Republic of Ireland) Denise O'Sullivan	(United States) Gotham FC	30 June 2027 (Note: With an obligation to buy.)	

== Pre-season and friendlies ==
Liverpool faced Sheffield United, Leicester City, Birmingham City, Manchester United and Durham in their pre-season fixtures.

8 August 2026 Friendly	Liverpool	5–0	Sheffield United	Liverpool
12:30 BST	Bergström 8'; Endemann 16'; Itamura 50', 57'; Breen 61'	Report		Stadium: Melwood; Attendance: 0

15 August 2026 Friendly	Liverpool	2–0	Leicester City	Liverpool
14:00 BST	Clark 36'; Höbinger 40'	Report		Stadium: Melwood; Attendance: 0

19 August 2026 Friendly	Birmingham City	0–4	Liverpool	Birmingham
14:00 BST		Report	Kapocs 6'; Holland 42'; Itamura 70'; Shaw 80'	Stadium: Knighthead Performance Centre; Attendance: 0

23 August 2026 Friendly	Manchester United	1–2	Liverpool	Carrington
12:00 BST	Toone 51'	Report	Leitzig 49' (o.g.); Holland 60'	Stadium: Trafford Training Centre

30 August 2026 Friendly	Liverpool	7–1	Durham	St Helens
14:00 BST	Olsson 13', 18', 19'; Höbinger 44'; Holland 64'; Agrež 71'; Jones 78'	Report	Lowe 88'	Stadium: St Helens Stadium

== Women's Super League ==
=== League table ===
Pos	Team	Pld	W	D	L	GF	GA	GD	Pts
6	Arsenal	10	3	5	2	11	11	0	14
7	Aston Villa	10	3	4	3	11	16	−5	13
8	Liverpool	11	3	3	5	17	16	+1	12
9	Everton	10	3	3	4	8	10	−2	12
10	West Ham United	10	4	0	6	11	19	−8	12

Updated to match(es) played on 21 November 2026. Source: Women's Super League Table
Rules for classification: 1) Points; 2) Goal difference; 3) Number of goals scored.

=== Results summary ===
Overall								Home						Away					
Pld	W	D	L	GF	GA	GD	Pts	W	D	L	GF	GA	GD	W	D	L	GF	GA	GD
11	3	3	5	17	16	+1	12	1	3	1	6	5	+1	2	0	4	11	11	0

Last updated: 21 November 2026.
Source: WSL Football

=== Results by round ===
Round	1	2	3	4	5	6	7	8	9	10	11	12	13	14	15	16	17	18	19	20	21	22	23	24	25	26
Ground	A	H	A	H	A	A	H	A	H	A	H	A	H	A	A	H	H	A	H	A	H	A	H	H	A	H
Result	W	D	L	W	L	L	D	L	L	W	D															
Position	1	3	7	5	6	7	10	11	12	10																
Points	3	4	4	7	7	7	8	8	8	11	12															

Updated to match(es) played on 14 November 2026. Source: WSL Football
A = Away; H = Home; W = Win; D = Draw; L = Loss; P = Postponed

=== Matches ===
The Super League fixtures were released on 30 July 2026.

6 September 2026 1	Charlton Athletic	0–4	Liverpool	Charlton
14:00 BST	N'Dow (yellow card) 50'; Fitzgerald (yellow card) 51'; Whitehouse (yellow card) 90+5'	Report	Fisk 8', 52'; Holland (yellow card) 15'; Nagano (yellow card) 27'; Endemann 63'; Kapocs 90+5' (pen.)	Stadium: The Valley; Attendance: 2,151; Referee: Sophie Dennington

13 September 2026 2	Liverpool	1–1	Tottenham Hotspur	St Helens
14:00 BST	Csillag 59'	Report	Kerr 41' (o.g.); Summanen (yellow card) 57'; Blakstad (yellow card) 65'	Stadium: St Helens Stadium; Attendance: 2,293; Referee: Adewunmi Soneye

18 September 2026 3	Manchester City	4–2	Liverpool	Manchester
19:00 BST	Hemp 13', 90+5'; Shaw 45+2'; Fisk 90' (o.g.)	Report	Ramos (yellow card) 14'; Bergström 19', (yellow card) 89'; Endemann 28'; Nagano (yellow card) 66'	Stadium: Academy Stadium; Attendance: 3,216; Referee: Grace Lowe

27 September 2026 4	Liverpool	2–0	Everton	Liverpool
14:00 BST	Olsson 4'; Kapocs 86'	Report	Mace (yellow card) 54'	Stadium: Anfield; Attendance: 9,642; Referee: Kirsty Dowle

3 October 2026 5	Manchester United	1–0	Liverpool	Leigh
13:30 BST	Zigiotti 6'; Medina (yellow card) 52'; Awujo (yellow card) 86'	Report	Ramos (yellow card) 42'; Maclean (yellow card) 54'	Stadium: Leigh Sports Village; Attendance: 3,416; Referee: Phoebe Cross

18 October 2026 6	Aston Villa	2–1	Liverpool	Hednesford
14:00 BST	Grant 62'; Fisk 72' (o.g.)	Report	Ramos 16'	Stadium: Keys Park; Attendance: N/A; Referee: Megan Wilson

25 October 2026 7	Liverpool	2–2	London City Lionesses	St Helens
14:00 GMT	Olsson 19' (pen.); Fernández 90+2' (o.g.); Itamura (yellow card) 90+3'	Report	Van de Donk (yellow card) 17'; Godfrey 22'; Diani 44'; Fernández (yellow card) 69'	Stadium: St Helens Stadium; Attendance: N/A; Referee: Melissa Burgin

1 November 2026 8	West Ham United	4–1	Liverpool	Dagenham
14:00 GMT	Asseyi 7' (pen.), 62'; Wandeler 15'; Codina 44'; Siren (yellow card) 73'	Report	Kapocs (yellow card) 68'; Endemann 72'	Stadium: Victoria Road; Attendance: 1,274; Referee: William Davis

8 November 2026 9	Liverpool	1–2	Arsenal	Liverpool
12:00 GMT	Olsson 15'	Report	Russo 9', 45'; Foord (yellow card) 80'	Stadium: Anfield; Attendance: N/A; Referee: Thomas Parsons

14 November 2026 10	Brighton & Hove Albion	0–3	Liverpool	Brighton and Hove
17:15 GMT	Tvedten (yellow card) 35'	Report	Olsson 4', 78'; Kapocs 48'	Stadium: Falmer Stadium; Attendance: 4,502; Referee: Kirsty Dowle

21 November 2026 11	Liverpool	0–0	Chelsea	St Helens
12:45 GMT		Report		Stadium: St Helens Stadium; Referee: Ben Speedie

13 December 2026 12	Birmingham City	–	Liverpool	Birmingham
14:00 GMT				Stadium: St Andrew's

20 December 2026 13	Liverpool	–	Crystal Palace	St Helens
14:00 GMT				Stadium: St Helens Stadium

10 January 2027 14	Tottenham Hotspur	–	Liverpool	Leyton
14:00 GMT				Stadium: Brisbane Road

21 January 2027 15	Arsenal	–	Liverpool	Holloway
19:00 GMT				Stadium: Emirates Stadium

24 January 2027 16	Liverpool	–	West Ham United	St Helens
14:00 GMT				Stadium: St Helens Stadium

31 January 2027 17	Liverpool	–	Brighton & Hove Albion	St Helens
14:00 GMT				Stadium: St Helens Stadium

7 February 2027 18	Chelsea	–	Liverpool	Fulham
14:00 GMT				Stadium: Stamford Bridge

14 February 2027 19	Liverpool	–	Birmingham City	St Helens
14:00 GMT				Stadium: St Helens Stadium

14 March 2027 20	London City Lionesses	–	Liverpool	Bromley
14:00 GMT				Stadium: Hayes Lane

17 March 2027 21	Liverpool	–	Manchester United	St Helens
19:00 GMT				Stadium: St Helens Stadium

28 March 2027 22	Everton	–	Liverpool	Liverpool
14:00 BST				Stadium: Goodison Park

4 April 2027 23	Liverpool	–	Aston Villa	Liverpool
14:00 BST				Stadium: Anfield

2 May 2027 24	Liverpool	–	Charlton Athletic	St Helens
14:00 BST				Stadium: St Helens Stadium

9 May 2027 25	Crystal Palace	–	Liverpool	Sutton
14:00 BST				Stadium: Gander Green Lane

May 2027 26	Liverpool	–	Manchester City	St Helens
TBC BST				Stadium: St Helens Stadium

== Women's FA Cup ==
January 2027 Fourth round	–
15:00 GMT

== WSL Players Cup ==
=== League phase table ===
Pos	Grp	Team	Pld	W	PW	PL	L	GF	GA	GD	Pts	Qualification
2	SR	Brighton & Hove Albion	5	4	0	0	1	14	2	+12	12	Advance to Knockout Phase
3	NR	Everton	5	4	0	0	1	13	3	+10	12	Advance to Knockout Phase
4	NR	Liverpool	5	4	0	0	1	19	12	+7	12	Advance to Knockout Phase
5	SR	London City Lionesses	5	4	0	0	1	9	4	+5	12	Advance to Knockout Phase
6	SR	Tottenham Hotspur	5	3	0	2	0	15	2	+13	11	Advance to Knockout Phase

Updated to match(es) played on 18 November 2026. Source: WSL Football
Rules for classification: 1) Points; 2) Goal difference; 3) Number of goals scored; 4) Number of wins; 5) Head-to-head record

=== League phase results by round ===
Round	1	2	3	4	5	6
Ground	H	A	H	H	A	A
Result	W	W	L	W	W	
Position	3	4	6	6	4	
Points	3	6	6	9	12	

Source: WSL Football
A = Away; H = Home; W = Win; D = Draw; L = Loss; P = Postponed

=== League phase matches ===
The Players Cup league phase fixtures were released on 6 August 2026.

23 September 2026 1	Liverpool	4–2	Sunderland	St Helens
19:00 BST	Shaw 24'; Höbinger 47', 56'; Ramos 55'	Report	Paxton 44'; Parker 45+2'	Stadium: St Helens Stadium; Attendance: 1,717; Referee: Aimee Keir

30 September 2026 2	Birmingham City	3–4	Liverpool	Birmingham
19:00 BST	Levasseur 34'; Lee Geum-min 50'; Leidhammar 76'	Report	Höbinger 4', 54'; McDonald 51'; Woodham (yellow card) 80'; Ramos 90+3'	Stadium: St Andrew's; Attendance: 610; Referee: Julia Kings

21 October 2026 3	Liverpool	3–5	Manchester United	St Helens
19:00 BST	Kapocs 76', 85', 88'	Report	Schüller 11'; Griffiths 41', 44'; Hill (yellow card) 68'; Jusu Bah 72'; Le Tissier 78'	Stadium: St Helens Stadium; Attendance: 2,388; Referee: Abigail Byrne

11 November 2026 4	Liverpool	4–1	Aston Villa	St Helens
19:00 GMT	Agrež (yellow card) 21'; Höbinger 30'; Kapocs 78'; Olsson 85', 89'	Report	Kearns 6'; Taylor (yellow card) 16'; Wilms (yellow card) 20'	Stadium: St Helens Stadium; Attendance: 1,685; Referee: Phoebe Cross

18 November 2026 5	Nottingham Forest	1–4	Liverpool	West Bridgford
19:00 GMT	Batty (red card) 11'; Rose 84'	Report	Enderby 20', 69'; Olsson 40'; Ferguson 45' (o.g.); Höbinger (yellow card) 88'	Stadium: City Ground; Attendance: 1,002; Referee: Megan Wilson

16 December 2026 6	Burnley	–	Liverpool	Burnley
19:00 GMT				Stadium: Turf Moor

== Squad statistics ==
As of match played 21 November 2026

=== Appearances ===
No.	Pos	Nat	Player	Total		Super League		FA Cup		Players Cup	
No.	Pos	Nat	Player	Apps	Goals	Apps	Goals	Apps	Goals	Apps	Goals
1	GK	(England) ENG	Rachael Laws	0	0	0+0	0	0+0	0	0+0	0
2	DF	(England) ENG	Lucy Parry	3	0	0+0	0	0+0	0	3+0	0
4	DF	(England) ENG	Grace Fisk	12	2	11+0	2	0+0	0	1+0	0
6	MF	(Spain) ESP	Natalia Ramos	15	3	9+2	1	0+0	0	1+3	2
7	FW	(Sweden) SWE	Cornelia Kapocs	15	7	11+0	3	0+0	0	0+4	4
8	MF	(Japan) JPN	Fūka Nagano	16	0	11+0	0	0+0	0	4+1	0
9	FW	(Germany) GER	Vivien Endemann	11	3	8+2	3	0+0	0	0+1	0
10	FW	(Norway) NOR	Sophie Román Haug	2	0	0+1	0	0+0	0	0+1	0
11	FW	(Sweden) SWE	Beata Olsson	15	8	11+0	5	0+0	0	3+1	3
12	GK	(England) ENG	Khiara Keating	12	0	11+0	0	0+0	0	1+0	0
13	FW	(England) ENG	Mia Enderby	7	2	1+1	0	0+0	0	5+0	2
14	MF	(Austria) AUT	Marie Höbinger	12	5	0+7	0	0+0	0	5+0	5
16	DF	(Wales) WAL	Lily Woodham	7	0	0+2	0	0+0	0	5+0	0
17	DF	(Scotland) SCO	Jenna Clark	12	0	11+0	0	0+0	0	0+1	0
18	MF	(Wales) WAL	Ceri Holland	2	0	2+0	0	0+0	0	0+0	0
19	MF	(Scotland) SCO	Kirsty Maclean	10	0	8+0	0	0+0	0	0+2	0
21	FW	(Norway) NOR	Anna Jøsendal	0	0	0+0	0	0+0	0	0+0	0
22	GK	(England) ENG	Faye Kirby	4	0	0+0	0	0+0	0	4+0	0
23	DF	(Slovenia) SLO	Sara Agrež	9	0	1+3	0	0+0	0	5+0	0
24	MF	(Scotland) SCO	Sam Kerr	10	0	9+0	0	0+0	0	0+1	0
25	DF	(Sweden) SWE	Alice Bergström	16	1	5+6	1	0+0	0	5+0	0
26	MF	(Japan) JPN	Mao Itamura	8	0	1+5	0	0+0	0	2+0	0
27	FW	(Switzerland) SUI	Aurélie Csillag	5	1	0+3	1	0+0	0	2+0	0
28	DF	(England) ENG	Mari Ward	6	0	2+2	0	0+0	0	0+2	0
29	DF	(Spain) ESP	Alejandra Bernabé	10	0	9+1	0	0+0	0	0+0	0
36	MF	(England) ENG	Zara Shaw	5	1	0+0	0	0+0	0	4+1	1
48	MF	(England) ENG	Izzie Breen	2	0	0+0	0	0+0	0	0+2	0
57	FW	(Scotland) SCO	Neve McDonald	3	1	0+0	0	0+0	0	0+3	1
87	MF	(England) ENG	Maizie Trueman	6	0	0+1	0	0+0	0	5+0	0

=== Goals ===
Rank	Pos.	No.	Player	Super League	FA Cup	Players Cup	Total
1	FW	11	(Sweden) Beata Olsson	5	0	3	8
2	FW	7	(Sweden) Cornelia Kapocs	3	0	4	7
3	MF	14	(Austria) Marie Höbinger	0	0	5	5
4	MF	6	(Spain) Natalia Ramos	1	0	2	3
5	DF	4	(England) Grace Fisk	2	0	0	2
5	FW	9	(Germany) Vivien Endemann	2	0	0	2
5	FW	13	(England) Mia Enderby	0	0	2	2
8	DF	25	(Sweden) Alice Bergström	1	0	0	1
8	FW	27	(Switzerland) Aurélie Csillag	1	0	0	1
8	MF	36	(England) Zara Shaw	0	0	1	1
8	FW	57	(Scotland) Neve McDonald	0	0	1	1
Own goals				1	0	1	2
Total				16	0	19	35

=== Assists ===
Rank	Pos.	No.	Player	Super League	FA Cup	Players Cup	Total
1	DF	16	(Wales) Lily Woodham	0	0	5	5
2	FW	9	(Germany) Vivien Endemann	3	0	0	3
3	MF	6	(Spain) Natalia Ramos	2	0	0	2
3	FW	7	(Sweden) Cornelia Kapocs	1	0	1	2
3	MF	8	(Japan) Fūka Nagano	2	0	0	2
3	MF	14	(Austria) Marie Höbinger	0	0	2	2
7	FW	11	(Sweden) Beata Olsson	0	0	1	1
7	DF	25	(Sweden) Alice Bergström	0	0	1	1
7	FW	27	(Switzerland) Aurélie Csillag	0	0	1	1
7	MF	87	(England) Maizie Trueman	0	0	1	1
Total				8	0	12	20

=== Clean sheets ===
Rank	No.	Player	Super League	FA Cup	Players Cup	Total
1	12	(England) Khiara Keating	4	0	0	4
2	1	(England) Rachael Laws	0	0	0	0
2	22	(England) Faye Kirby	0	0	0	0
Total			4	0	0	4

=== Disciplinary record ===
No.	Pos.	Player	Super League			FA Cup			Players Cup			Total		
No.	Pos.	Player	Yellow card	(yellow card) (yellow-red card)	Red card	Yellow card	(yellow card) (yellow-red card)	Red card	Yellow card	(yellow card) (yellow-red card)	Red card	Yellow card	(yellow card) (yellow-red card)	Red card
6	MF	(Spain) Natalia Ramos	2	0	0	0	0	0	0	0	0	2	0	0
7	FW	(Sweden) Cornelia Kapocs	1	0	0	0	0	0	0	0	0	1	0	0
8	MF	(Japan) Fūka Nagano	2	0	0	0	0	0	0	0	0	2	0	0
14	MF	(Austria) Marie Höbinger	0	0	0	0	0	0	1	0	0	1	0	0
16	DF	(Wales) Lily Woodham	0	0	0	0	0	0	1	0	0	1	0	0
18	MF	(Wales) Ceri Holland	1	0	0	0	0	0	0	0	0	1	0	0
19	MF	(Scotland) Kirsty Maclean	1	0	0	0	0	0	0	0	0	1	0	0
23	DF	(Slovenia) Sara Agrež	0	0	0	0	0	0	1	0	0	1	0	0
25	DF	(Sweden) Alice Bergström	1	0	0	0	0	0	0	0	0	1	0	0
26	MF	(Japan) Mao Itamura	1	0	0	0	0	0	0	0	0	1	0	0
Total			9	0	0	0	0	0	3	0	0	12	0	0
