= Aurélie Csillag =

Swiss footballer (born 2003)

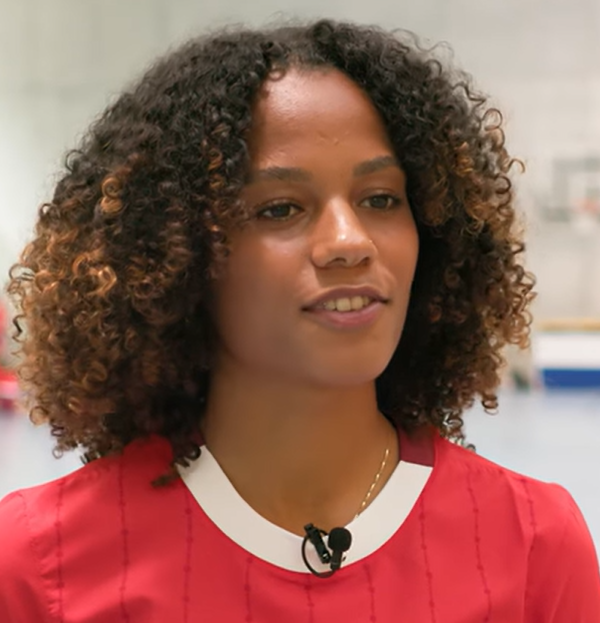
- Csillag in 2025

Personal information
- Date of birth: 24 January 2003 (age 23)
- Place of birth: Zurich, Switzerland
- Height: 1.72 m (5 ft 8 in)
- Position: Forward

Team information
- Current team: Liverpool
- Number: 27

Youth career
- 2013–2015: Blue Stars
- 2015–2020: Grasshopper

Senior career*
Years	Team	Apps	(Gls)
2020–2022	Grasshopper	39	(6)
2023–2025	Basel	57	(21)
2025	SC Freiburg	12	(3)
2026–	Liverpool	12	(2)

International career^{‡}
2018–2019	Switzerland U16	7	(1)
2019–2020	Switzerland U17	8	(1)
2021–2022	Switzerland U19	10	(3)
2023–	Switzerland	16	(3)
- * Club domestic league appearances and goals as of 16:14, 28 September 2026 (UTC) ‡ National team caps and goals as of 04:36, 27 April 2026 (UTC)

Aurélie Csillag (born 24 January 2003) is a Swiss professional footballer who plays as a forward for Women's Super League club Liverpool and the Switzerland national team. She previously played for Swiss teams Grasshopper Club Zurich, FC Basel, and Frauen-Bundesliga side SC Freiburg.

== Club career ==
A native of Zurich, Csillag started playing football for local club FC Blue Stars. She moved to Grasshopper Club Zurich's youth system in early 2015 and eventually worked her way up to a first-team contract. She spent a total of 7 years with Grasshopper, scoring 20 goals in 59 competitive appearances. In 4 of her 7 years at the club, she served as an apprentice in Grasshopper's sport management department, serving as an assistant and familiarizing herself with the inner workings of the club.

In February 2023, Csillag moved to FC Basel. She quickly became a regular in Basel's starting lineup. By June 2024, she started fielding offers from clubs abroad, but instead opted to extend her contract with Basel through 2025. In her time with the club, she made 54 appearances across all competitions, helping contribute to one Swiss Women's Cup final appearance and two league playoff semifinal cameos.

On 15 May 2025, Csillag was announced to have signed for German club SC Freiburg. Over the first half of the season, she struggled to break into Freiburg's first-choice lineup, starting in only 3 of her 12 Frauen-Bundesliga appearances. Nevertheless, Csillag managed to find some offensive production, scoring three league goals in her stint with Freiburg. Her first two goals came on 20 September 2025, coming in quick succession to help Freiburg beat Hamburger SV, 6–2. On 22 November, Csillag recorded a goal and an assist after coming off of the bench in a victory over FC Carl Zeiss Jena.

After spending eight months in Germany, Csillag transferred to English Women's Super League club Liverpool in January 2026. The move reunited her with former SC Freiburg teammate Rafaela Borggräfe. On 25 January, Csillag made her WSL debut, starting and playing approximately 80 minutes in a victory over Tottenham Hotspur. She scored her first Liverpool goal on 8 February, contributing to a 4–1 win over Aston Villa.

== International career ==
Csillag has represented Switzerland at multiple youth national levels. She made her debut for the senior national team in early 2023.

Csillag narrowly missed out on the Switzerland squad that competed as hosts at the UEFA Women's Euro 2025. Five months after the tournament, in December 2025, she scored her first senior international goal, in a friendly against Wales.

== Personal life ==
Csillag has been in a relationship with professional track and field athlete Lilly Nägeli since 2022.

== Career statistics ==
=== Club ===
As of match played 27 September 2026

Appearances and goals by club, season and competition
Club	Season	League			National cup (Note: Includes Swiss Women's Cup, PFB-Pokal, Women's FA Cup)		League cup (Note: Includes Women's League Cup)		Total	
Club	Season	Division	Apps	Goals	Apps	Goals	Apps	Goals	Apps	Goals
Grasshopper	2019–20	Swiss Women's Super League	1	0	0	0	—		1	0
Grasshopper	2020–21	Swiss Women's Super League	20	2	5	4	—		25	6
Grasshopper	2021–22	Swiss Women's Super League	18	4	5	2	—		23	6
Grasshopper	Total		39	6	10	6	0	0	49	12
Basel	2022–23	Swiss Women's Super League	19	7	2	3	—		21	10
Basel	2023–24	Swiss Women's Super League	21	10	4	1	—		25	11
Basel	2024–25	Swiss Women's Super League	17	4	5	2	—		22	6
Basel	Total		57	21	11	6	0	0	68	27
SC Freiburg	2025–26	Frauen-Bundesliga	12	3	2	1	—		14	4
Liverpool	2025–26	Women's Super League	9	1	3	0	0	0	12	1
Liverpool	2026–27	Women's Super League	3	1	0	0	1	0	4	1
Liverpool	Total		12	2	3	0	1	0	16	2
Career total			120	32	26	13	1	0	147	45

=== International ===
As of match played 18 April 2026

Appearances and goals by national team and year
National team	Year	Apps	Goals
Switzerland	2023	2	0
Switzerland	2024	5	0
Switzerland	2025	5	1
Switzerland	2026	4	2
Total		16	3

Scores and results list Switzerland's goal tally first, score column indicates score after each Csillag goal.

List of international goals scored by Aurélie Csillag
No.	Date	Venue	Opponent	Score	Result	Competition
1	2 December 2025	Estadio Municipal de Chapín, Jerez, Spain	Wales	1–1	2–3	Friendly
2	14 April 2026	Letzigrund, Zurich, Switzerland	Turkey	1–0	3–1	2027 FIFA Women's World Cup qualification
3	14 April 2026	Letzigrund, Zurich, Switzerland	Turkey	2–1	3–1	2027 FIFA Women's World Cup qualification
4	5 June 2026	Cornaredo Stadium, Lugano, Switzerland	Malta	4–1	6–1	2027 FIFA Women's World Cup qualification
