= Mia Enderby =

English footballer

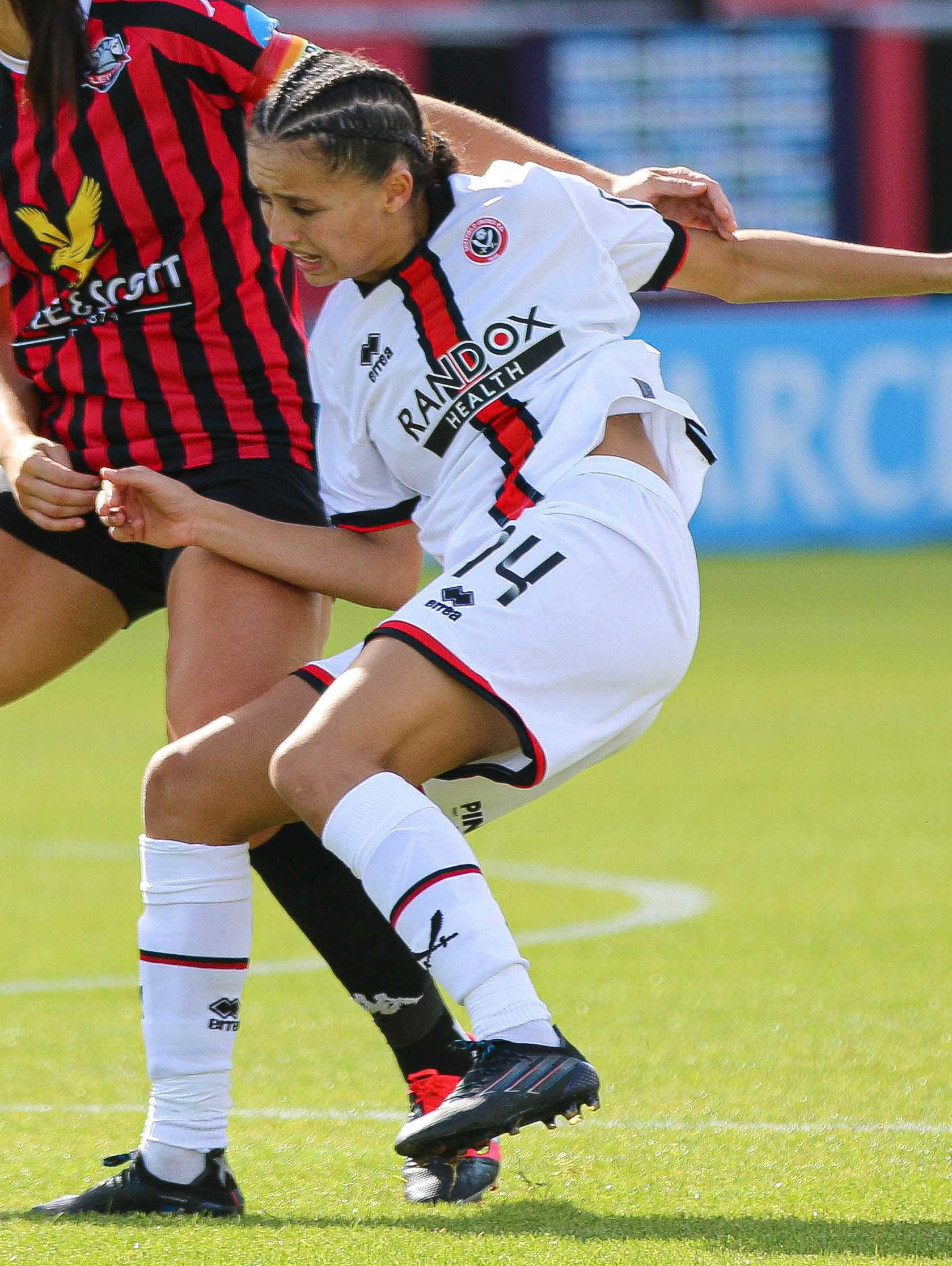
- Enderby in 2022

Personal information
- Full name: Mia Elise Enderby
- Date of birth: 31 May 2005 (age 21)
- Place of birth: England
- Height: 1.66 m (5 ft 5 in)
- Position: Forward

Team information
- Current team: Liverpool
- Number: 13

Youth career
- 2017–2021: Leeds United
- 2021: Sheffield United

Senior career*
Years	Team	Apps	(Gls)
2021–2023	Sheffield United	33	(7)
2023–	Liverpool	53	(3)

International career^{‡}
2021–2022	England U17	6	(0)
2022–2024	England U19	19	(6)
2024–	England U23	4	(0)
- * Club domestic league appearances and goals as of 17:00, 16 May 2026 (UTC) ‡ National team caps and goals as of 21 February 2025

Mia Elise Enderby (/ˈɛndɚbi/; born 31 May 2005) is an English professional footballer playing as a forward for Women's Super League club Liverpool. She also plays for the England under-23 national team.

== Early life ==
Enderby begun playing football aged six, where she would often play with teenagers or the boys team as opportunities to play against other girls were few and far between. She began her footballing career with Leeds United's Regional Talent Centre, where she joined their U12 girls team in 2017. She progressed through the club's youth rank before leaving the club in 2021.

== Club career ==
=== Sheffield United ===
Enderby joined Sheffield United in the Women's Championship as a 16 year old in July 2021 and was handed her senior debut in the league opening against Blackburn Rovers on 29 August 2022. She scored her first senior goal for the club in a Women's FA Cup match against Stourbridge in December 2022. She made 17 appearances across all competitions for Sheffield United in her first senior season, mostly as a substitute, and won the team's Young Player of the Season award.

=== Liverpool ===
On 13 July 2023, Enderby signed with Women's Super League side Liverpool on undisclosed fees. On 31 July 2025, it was announced she had signed a new contract to extend her time with the club.

On 2 November 2025, Enderby was taken off the pitch with a suspected neck injury during a 2–1 defeat against Tottenham Hotspur, but was able to resume training shortly after. On 25 January 2026, she scored both goals in stoppage time of a 2–0 win over Tottenham to help Liverpool to their first league victory of the 2025–26 season.

== International career ==
Enderby scored her first competitive youth international goal for England during 2024 Under-19 Championship qualification against Greece on 24 October 2023, followed by a brace against Wales three days later. In the final tournament in July 2024, she scored an equaliser against Serbia, as well as a goal in the semi-final where the team lost 3–1 against Spain.

In October 2024 Enderby was called up to the England under-23s for European League fixtures. On 29 October, she made her debut for the under-23s as part of the starting eleven in a 1–0 win over Portugal, followed by starting in a 0–0 draw with Norway as the number 9 on 28 November.

== Career statistics ==
=== Club ===
As of match played 27 September 2026

Appearances and goals by club, season and competition
Club	Season	League			FA cup		League cup (Note: Includes FA Women's League Cup)		Total	
Club	Season	Division	Apps	Goals	Apps	Goals	Apps	Goals	Apps	Goals
Sheffield United	2021–22	Women's Championship	14	0	1	1	2	0	17	1
Sheffield United	2022–23	Women's Championship	19	7	1	0	3	1	23	8
Sheffield United	Total		33	7	1	0	5	1	39	9
Liverpool	2023–24	Women's Super League	14	0	3	0	3	1	20	1
Liverpool	2024–25	Women's Super League	17	0	2	1	3	4	22	5
Liverpool	2025–26	Women's Super League	22	3	4	2	4	1	29	6
Liverpool	2026–27	Women's Super League	0	0	0	0	1	0	1	0
Liverpool	Total		53	3	9	3	11	6	72	12
Career total			86	10	10	3	16	7	111	21
