= Beata Olsson =

Swedish footballer (born 2001)

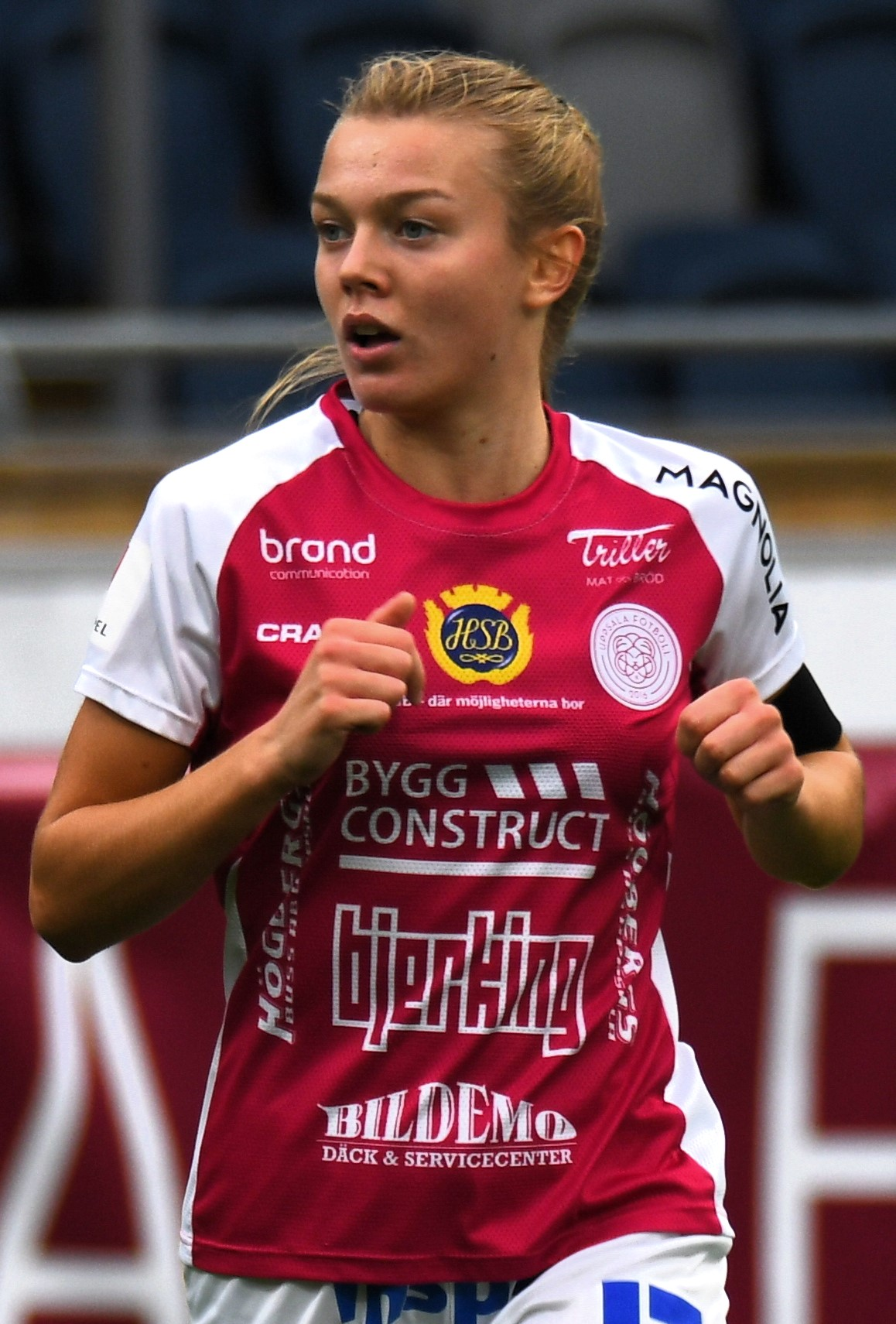
- Olsson with Uppsala in 2020

Personal information
- Full name: Beata Karin Eleonora Olsson
- Date of birth: 31 January 2001 (age 25)
- Place of birth: Stockholm, Sweden
- Height: 1.65 m (5 ft 5 in)
- Position: Striker

Team information
- Current team: Liverpool
- Number: 11

College career
| Years | Team | Apps | (Gls) |
| 2021 | Florida Gators | 7 | (8) |
| 2021–2023 | Florida State Seminoles | 66 | (27) |

Senior career*
| Years | Team | Apps | (Gls) |
| 2015–2017 | Enköping | 35 | (43) |
| 2018–2021 | Uppsala | 72 | (23) |
| 2024 | AIK | 19 | (6) |
| 2025 | Kristianstad | 15 | (10) |
| 2025– | Liverpool | 20 | (7) |

International career^{‡}
| 2016–2018 | Sweden U17 | 16 | (10) |
| 2018–2020 | Sweden U19 | 23 | (7) |
| 2021–2022 | Sweden U23 | 5 | (2) |
| 2026– | Sweden | 1 | (0) |
- * Club domestic league appearances and goals as of 16:13, 28 September 2026 (UTC) ‡ National team caps and goals as of 16:59, 19 April 2026 (UTC)

Beata Karin Eleonora Olsson (born 31 January 2001) is a Swedish professional footballer who plays as a striker for Women's Super League club Liverpool and the Sweden national team.

After starting her career with Enköping and Uppsala, Olsson played college soccer for the Florida Gators and the Florida State Seminoles, winning two national championships with the Seminoles. She then signed with AIK and helped narrowly avoid relegation in 2024, before joining Kristianstad and then Liverpool the following year.

She represented Sweden at various youth levels before making her senior team debut in 2026.

== Early years ==
Olsson was born in Stockholm and raised in Enköping. She started out with FC Djursholm before joining local Division 2 club Enköping [men]. She made the first team at the age of 14 and scored 43 goals in 35 games between 2015 and 2017, with the last season at Division 1 level.

Olsson was signed by IK Uppsala Fotboll ahead of the 2018 Elitettan season. She made her club debut on 10 February 2018 in the first round of the Swedish Cup and scored in the second minute of the match, though Eskilstuna came back to win 2–1. She made her Elitettan second-division debut on 15 April as a 71st-minute substitute in a 5–0 win against Böljan. She scored her first Elitettan goal on 24 May to extend the lead in the 15th minute in a 2–0 win against Västerås BK30. She ended her rookie season with two goals in 18 appearances.

Olsson made an impact at Uppsala in the 2019 season, scoring 12 goals in 24 games. In the pivotal season finale on 27 October, she scored the last goal in a 3–1 comeback win against Hammarby which secured Uppsala's narrow promotion to the top-division Damallsvenskan for the first time. On 27 June 2020, she scored her first Damallsvenskan goal in the 91st minute of the first game of the 2020 season to defeat Djurgården 3–2. She tallied five goals in 21 matches in her first top-division season. After the season, Uppsala was relegated back to the Elitettan.

== College career ==
=== Florida Gators ===
Olsson joined the Florida Gators in the spring of 2021, saying she chose Florida because it had warmer weather than Sweden. She was a bright spot on the team that came second-to-last in the Southeastern Conference, leading her Gators with seven goals and adding five assists in eight games. She then spent the summer back with Uppsala, scoring four goals in nine games in the Elitettan. When head coach Becky Burleigh retired, she transferred to the national powerhouse and rival Florida State Seminoles, later saying she was not fully aware of the rivalry between the schools.

=== Florida State Seminoles ===
Olsson slotted comfortably into Florida State's free-flowing offensive and led the team in scoring with 14 goals in 20 games in the fall of 2021. She scored twice in a rout against her former team Florida, including a bicycle kick goal that made SportsCenter's top plays. She scored her third brace of the season in a 2–2 draw to North Carolina, which helped Florida State place second in the conference before winning the ACC tournament. She scored three goals during the NCAA tournament, including a golden goal to defeat Michigan in the quarterfinals, as the Seminoles won their fourth national championship.

Though head coach Mark Krikorian stepped down and was replaced by Brian Pensky, Olsson stayed at Florida State along with most of her teammates in 2022, though many of whom including her had considered transferring. She started every game and contributed six goals and three assists in her junior year, helping get to the semifinals of the NCAA tournament, where they lost to North Carolina.

After helping Florida State go undefeated to win the ACC regular-season title, Olsson had a standout postseason in her senior year in 2023. Ib the ACC tournament, she scored the second goal against Pittsburgh in the semifinals and assisted the winning goal by Onyi Echegini against Clemson in the final. She then recorded a goal or assist in the first three rounds of the NCAA tournament. She added another goal and two assists in Florida State's dominant 5–1 performance against Stanford in the championship game, capping an undefeated season with her second national title.

== Club career ==
=== AIK ===
On 6 January 2024, after graduating from college, Olsson signed with Damallsvenskan club AIK Fotboll on a one-year contract with the option for another year. She scored on her club debut on 9 March, winning 2–1 against KIF Örebro in Swedish Cup the first round. AIK struggled at the start of the year but finished the season on seven games unbeaten. Olsson scored five league goals during that span and was named the Damallsvenskan Player of the Month for October. On 2 November, she scored a first-half brace in an important 4–0 win over Trelleborg. On 23 November, she scored against Umeå in the relegation playoffs second leg, helping keep AIK in the top league after winning 2–1 on aggregate.

=== Kristianstad ===
Olsson joined fellow Damallsvenskan club Kristianstad the following season. On 9 March 2025, she scored her first goal for the club in a 1–0 win over KIF Örebro in the Swedish Cup. Later that month, she scored her first league goal for the club in a 2–0 win over eventual champions BK Häcken. On 17 May, she scored against IFK Norrköping to mark a fifth consecutive league game with a goal. She left the club on 4 September, having scored 10 times in 15 league games.

=== Liverpool ===
On 4 September 2025, Women's Super League club Liverpool announced that they had signed Olsson as their first new player under head coach Gareth Taylor. She made her debut three days later in a 4–1 loss to Everton in the season opener. On 2 November, she scored her first Liverpool goal in a 2–1 defeat to Tottenham Hotspur. On 22 November, she scored a hat trick against Sheffield United to advance to the Women's League Cup quarterfinals. On 6 December, she scored in a 2–1 defeat to Arsenal to become the first player to score in four of her first five WSL starts.

== International career ==
Olsson played for the Sweden youth national team from the under-17 to under-23 level, scoring 19 goals in 44 appearances. She scored six goals during the 2018 UEFA Under-17 Championship qualification stage and eight goals across the 2019 and 2020 UEFA Under-19 Championship qualification events.

Olsson received her first senior international call up for the UEFA Women's Nations League third-place tie against France but remain an unused substitute. She made her debut appearance for the senior national team on 18 April 2026 in a FIFA Women's World Cup qualifier match against Serbia, appearing as a 85th minute substitute.

== Style of play ==
Olsson plays as a striker.

== Career statistics ==
=== Club ===
As of match played 27 September 2026

Appearances and goals by club, season and competition
| Club | Season | League | | | National cup (Note: Includes Svenska Cupen, Women's FA Cup) | | League cup (Note: Includes Women's League Cup) | | Total | |
| Club | Season | Division | Apps | Goals | Apps | Goals | Apps | Goals | Apps | Goals |
|---|---|---|---|---|---|---|---|---|---|---|
| IK Uppsala | 2018 | Elitettan | 18 | 2 | 1 | 1 | — | | 19 | 3 |
| IK Uppsala | 2019 | Elitettan | 24 | 12 | 4 | 2 | — | | 28 | 14 |
| IK Uppsala | 2020 | Damallsvenskan | 21 | 5 | 3 | 1 | — | | 24 | 6 |
| IK Uppsala | 2021 | Elitettan | 9 | 4 | 1 | 1 | — | | 10 | 5 |
| IK Uppsala | Total | | 72 | 23 | 9 | 5 | 0 | 0 | 81 | 28 |
| AIK Fotboll | 2024 | Damallsvenskan | 21 | 7 | 3 | 1 | — | | 24 | 8 |
| Kristianstad | 2025 | Damallsvenskan | 15 | 10 | 2 | 1 | — | | 17 | 11 |
| Liverpool | 2025–26 | Women's Super League | 16 | 6 | 3 | 2 | 4 | 3 | 23 | 11 |
| Liverpool | 2026–27 | Women's Super League | 4 | 1 | 0 | 0 | 1 | 0 | 5 | 1 |
| Liverpool | Total | | 20 | 7 | 3 | 2 | 5 | 3 | 28 | 12 |
| Career total | | | 128 | 47 | 17 | 9 | 5 | 3 | 150 | 59 |

=== International ===
As of match played 18 April 2026

Appearances and goals by national team and year
| National team | Year | Apps | Goals |
|---|---|---|---|
| Sweden | 2026 | 1 | 0 |
| Total | | 1 | 0 |

== Honours ==
Florida State Seminoles

- NCAA Division I women's soccer tournament: 2021, 2023
- ACC women's soccer tournament: 2021, 2022, 2023

Individual

- Second-team All-ACC: 2021
- Third-team All-ACC: 2022, 2023
- ACC tournament all-tournament team: 2022, 2023
