= Zara Shaw =

English footballer (born 2007)

Personal information
- Full name: Zara Julie Shaw
- Date of birth: 6 June 2007 (age 19)
- Place of birth: Liverpool, England
- Height: 1.72 m (5 ft 8 in)
- Position: Midfielder

Team information
- Current team: Liverpool
- Number: 36

Youth career
- Huyton Corinthians
- Liverpool

Senior career*
Years	Team	Apps	(Gls)
2024–	Liverpool	5	(1)

International career^{‡}
2023–2024	England U17	14	(2)
2025	England U19	1	(0)
- * Club domestic league appearances and goals as of 17:08, 16 May 2026 (UTC) ‡ National team caps and goals as of 03:25, 5 January 2026 (UTC)

Zara Julie Shaw (born 6 June 2007) is an English professional footballer who plays as a midfielder for Women's Super League club Liverpool. She has represented England at the youth international level.

== Early life ==
Shaw was born and raised in Liverpool. She started playing football for local team Mags, where she was the only girl, before moving on to junior team Huyton Corinthians. At the age of 7, she was scouted by Liverpool FC in a tournament. She signed for the club a year later and stayed with the Liverpool academy throughout the remainder of her youth career. Shaw balanced her football training with an education at The Prescot School.

== Club career ==
Ahead of the 2023–24 Women's Super League, Shaw had been poised to break into the Liverpool senior team. However, an ACL injury in a preseason match against Birmingham City in August 2023 sidelined her for the majority of the season. After recovering, she made her professional debut in Liverpool's last game of the season, a May 2024 league match against Leicester City.

Shaw missed a portion of the 2024–25 season on international duty. Upon returning, she helped bolster a Liverpool senior midfield that had grown thin. She became a regular name on the squad list, starting matches against Arsenal and Manchester United. On 24 November 2024, she scored her first senior goal, netting in a League Cup match against Newcastle United. Her season was cut short in April 2025 after she picked up an injury while with the England under-19s. Shaw had made 9 first-team appearances in all competitions up to that point.

During her recovery, Shaw signed her first professional contract with Liverpool in August 2025. On 5 April 2026, she returned to the pitch for her first match post-injury in Liverpool's FA Cup quarterfinal match against Charlton Athletic, scoring the 115th-minute game-winning goal to help Liverpool advance to the semifinals.

== International career ==
Shaw started her youth international career in 2023, contributing to the England under-17 squad's qualification to the 2023 UEFA Women's Under-17 Championship. The following year, she helped the team reach the semifinals of the 2024 FIFA U-17 Women's World Cup, where the team was knocked out by Spain. Despite officially listed as a midfielder, Shaw spent much of the tournament at centre-back. In the team's quarterfinal match against Japan, she scored a game-tying header (her second goal of the tournament) to force the match to penalties before converting the deciding spot-kick in the ensuing penalty shootout.

On 8 April 2025, Shaw was participating in an under-19 national team match against Ukraine when she injured her ACL. It was her second ACL injury in less than two years.

== Career statistics ==
=== Club ===
As of match played 27 September 2026

Appearances and goals by club, season and competition
Club	Season	League			National cup (Note: Includes Women's FA Cup)		League cup (Note: Includes FA Women's League Cup)		Total	
Club	Season	Division	Apps	Goals	Apps	Goals	Apps	Goals	Apps	Goals
Liverpool	2023–24	Women's Super League	1	0	0	0	0	0	1	0
Liverpool	2024–25	Women's Super League	3	0	2	0	3	1	8	1
Liverpool	2025–26	Women's Super League	1	1	1	1	0	0	2	2
Liverpool	2026–27	Women's Super League	0	0	0	0	1	1	1	1
Liverpool	Total		5	1	3	1	4	2	12	4
Career total			5	1	3	1	4	2	12	4
