= Alice Bergström =

Swedish footballer (born 2003)

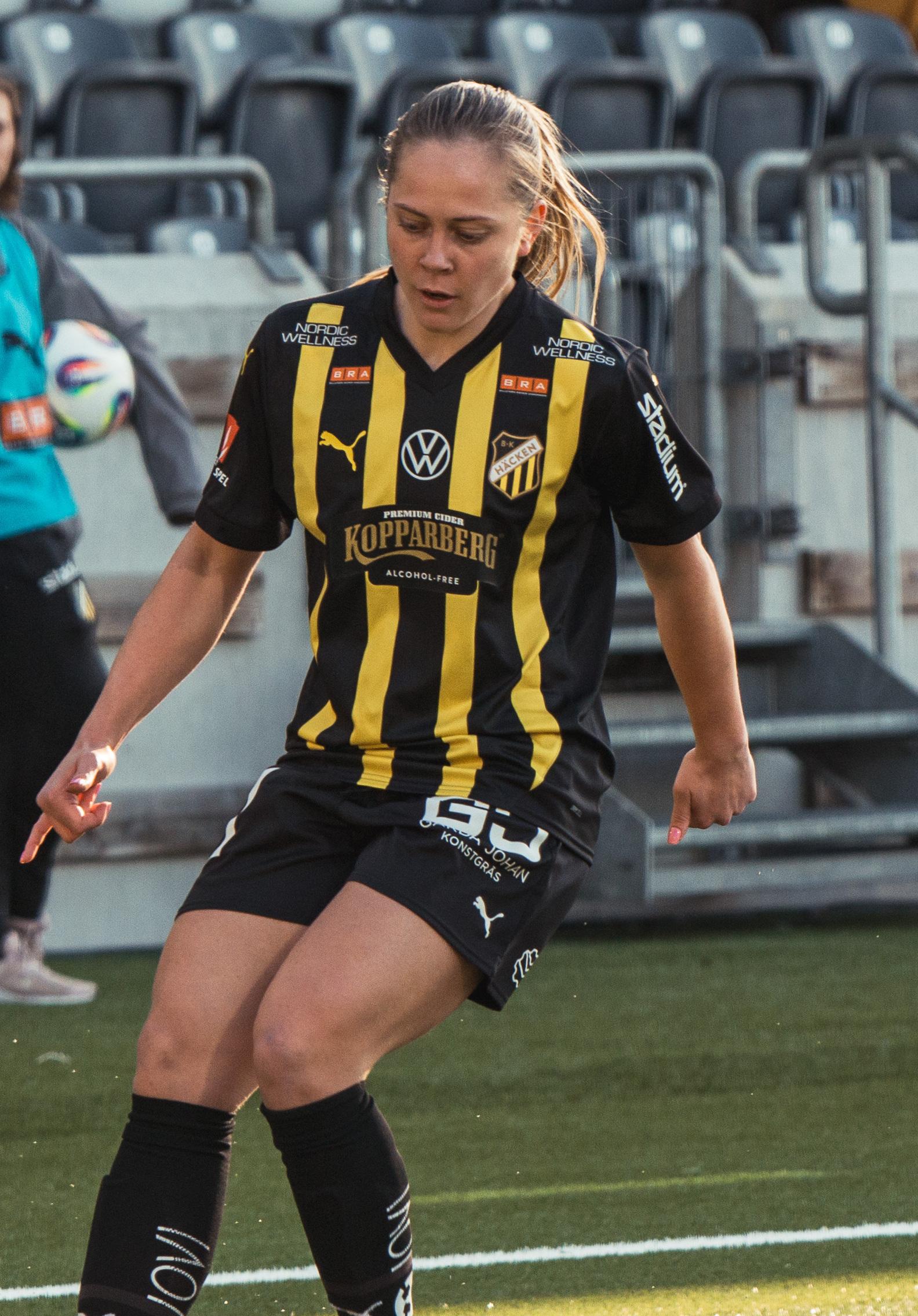
- Bergström with BK Häcken in 2025

Personal information
- Full name: Alice Jenny Bergström
- Date of birth: 3 February 2003 (age 23)
- Height: 1.70 m (5 ft 7 in)
- Positions: Right-back; right winger

Team information
- Current team: Liverpool
- Number: 25

Youth career
- Tyresö FF

Senior career*
Years	Team	Apps	(Gls)
2019–2020	Tyresö FF	31	(16)
2021	Älvsjö AIK	26	(8)
2022–2023	Djurgården	48	(4)
2024–2025	BK Häcken	50	(11)
2026–	Liverpool	12	(1)

International career^{‡}
2021	Sweden U19	3	(1)
2023–	Sweden U23	22	(1)
- * Club domestic league appearances and goals as of 16:00, 28 September 2026 (UTC) ‡ National team caps and goals as of 16:19, 22 December 2025 (UTC)

Alice Jenny Bergström (born 3 February 2003) is a Swedish professional footballer who plays as a right-back or right winger for Women's Super League club Liverpool and the Sweden under-23 national team.

== Club career ==
=== Early career ===
Bergström came up through the academy at Tyresö FF, signing her first professional contract in 2019. The following season, she was the topscorer of the Division 1, scoring 14 goals in 11 matches in 2020. In 2021, Bergström joined Elitettan club Älvsjö AIK, where she netted 8 times in 26 appearances.

=== Djugården ===
On 28 July 2021, Bergström inked a one-year contract for Swedish top-flight team Djurgårdens IF. She stayed at Älvsjö for five more months to round out the year before officially joining Djugården ahead of the 2022 Damallsvenskan. Bergström grappled with injury problems during preseason training and only ended up making 8 starts in 22 matches across her first season in the Damallsvenskan.

Bergström's playing time grew in her second year at Djugården, as she started all of the club's league matches in 2023. In March 2023, she scored her first Damallsvenskan goal, the game-winner against her future club BK Häcken. She was among nine players to initially depart from Djugården at the end of the season.

=== BK Häcken ===
In December 2023, Bergström was announced to have signed a three-year contract with BK Häcken. She made her Häcken debut in the UEFA Women's Champions League, participating in the club's quarterfinal first leg match against French team Paris Saint-Germain; PSG would eventually go on to eliminate Häcken 5–1 on aggregate. Once the Damallsvenskan started up, Bergström grew in confidence. She recorded 8 goals and 6 assists across the year in what has been described as a "breakthrough" season for her.

In 2025, Bergström's versatility was tested, and she was asked to play deeper down the field as a right-back on several occasions. She still managed to find chances to contribute offensively, including a long-distance goal against Kristianstads DFF in June 2025 that helped Häcken steal a draw in the waning minutes of the match. At the end of the year, Häcken finished in first place of the league and won the Damallsvenskan title for only the second time in club history.

=== Liverpool ===
On 2 January 2026, it was announced that Bergström had joined English club Liverpool, subject to international clearance, for an undisclosed fee. She made her Women's Super League debut on 11 January, starting and creating several chances in a scoreless draw with the London City Lionesses. She scored her first goals for Liverpool one week later, netting twice to help the club earn a 6–0 win over the London Bees in the Women's FA Cup.

== International career ==
Bergström started her international career with the Sweden under-19 national team, where she made 3 appearances and scored one goal. She has been capped 22 times for the U23 team; in 2025, she became one of the oldest and most experienced members of the squad.

Bergström received her first call-up to the Sweden senior national team in November 2025, ahead of two UEFA Women's Nations League matches against France to decide the third-place winner of the competition.

== Career statistics ==
=== Club ===
As of match played 27 September 2026

Appearances and goals by club, season and competition
Club	Season	League			National cup (Note: Includes Svenska Cupen, Women's FA Cup)		League cup (Note: Includes Women's League Cup)		Continental		Total	
Club	Season	Division	Apps	Goals	Apps	Goals	Apps	Goals	Apps	Goals	Apps	Goals
Tyresö FF	2019	Division 1	20	2	2	0	—		—		22	2
Tyresö FF	2020	Division 1	11	14	1	1	—		—		12	15
Tyresö FF	Total		31	16	3	1	0	0	0	0	34	17
Älvsjö AIK	2021	Elitettan	26	8	0	0	—		—		26	8
Djurgårdens IF	2022	Damallsvenskan	22	0	1	1	—		—		23	1
Djurgårdens IF	2023	Damallsvenskan	26	4	3	0	—		—		29	4
Djurgårdens IF	Total		48	4	4	1	0	0	0	0	52	5
BK Häcken	2023	Damallsvenskan	—		—		—		2 (Note: Appearance(s) in UEFA Women's Champions League)	0	2	0
BK Häcken	2024	Damallsvenskan	25	8	5	0	—		2	0	32	8
BK Häcken	2025	Damallsvenskan	25	3	4	3	—		6 (Note: Two appearance in UEFA Women's Champions League; four appearances in UEFA Women's Europa Cup)	0	35	6
BK Häcken	Total		50	11	9	3	0	0	10	0	67	14
Liverpool	2025–26	Women's Super League	8	1	3	2	0	0	—		11	3
Liverpool	2026–27	Women's Super League	4	0	0	0	1	0	—		5	0
Liverpool	Total		12	1	3	2	1	0	0	0	16	3
Career total			168	40	19	7	1	0	10	0	198	47
