= Jennifer Falk =

Swedish football goalkeeper

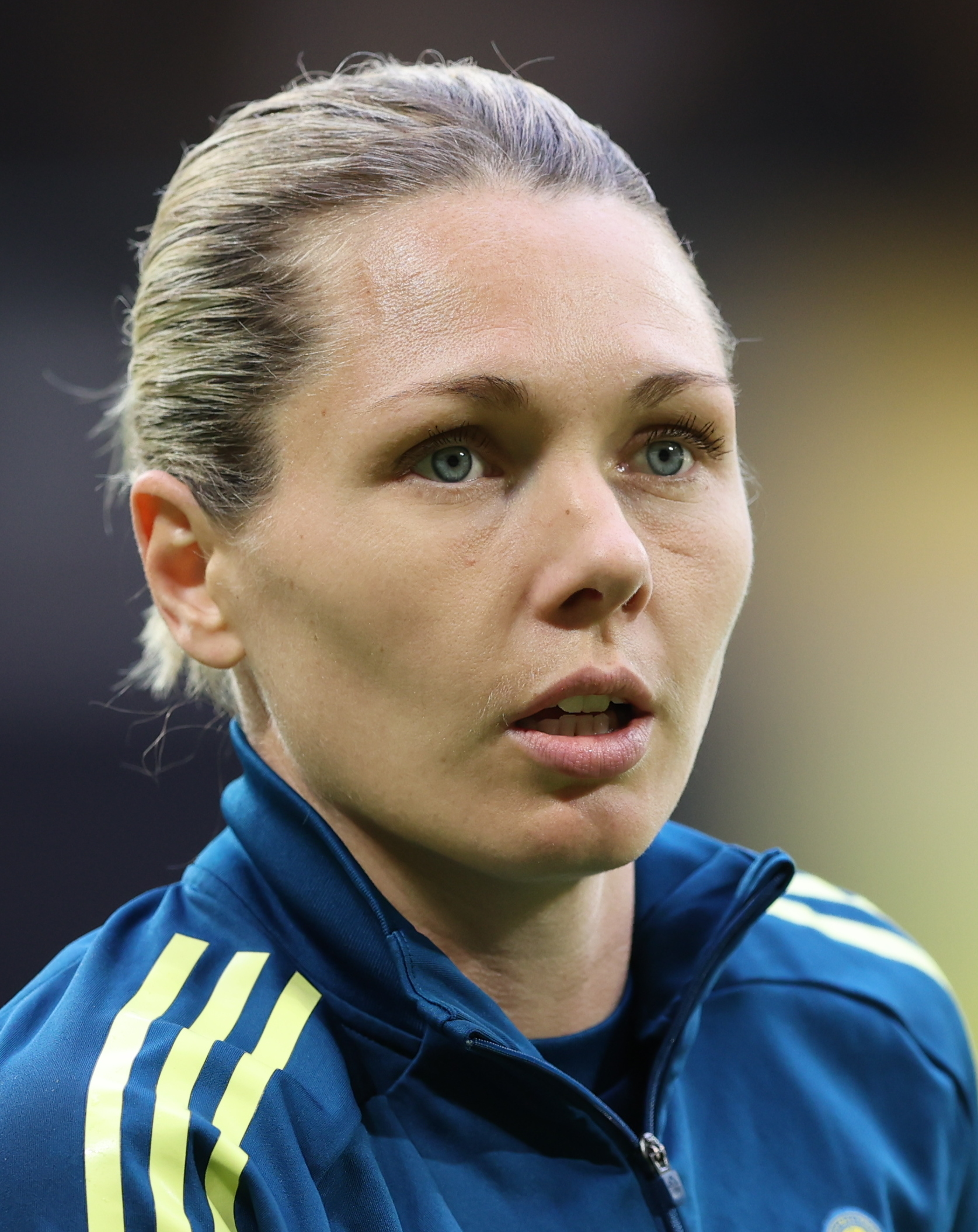
- Falk with Sweden in 2026

Personal information
- Full name: Jennifer Miley Falk
- Date of birth: 26 April 1993 (age 33)
- Place of birth: Sweden
- Height: 1.71 m (5 ft 7 in)
- Position: Goalkeeper

Team information
- Current team: BK Häcken
- Number: 13

Senior career*
Years	Team	Apps	(Gls)
2012–2013	Torslanda IK	0	(0)
2013–2014	Jitex BK	26	(0)
2015	Mallbackens IF	22	(0)
2016–	BK Häcken	175	(0)
2026	→ Liverpool (loan)	11	(0)

International career^{‡}
2020–	Sweden	46	(0)
Medal record
Women's soccer
Representing Sweden
Olympic Games
Silver medal – second place	2020 Tokyo	Team
FIFA Women's World Cup
Bronze medal – third place	2019 France	Team
- * Club domestic league appearances and goals as of 16:48, 16 May 2026 (UTC) ‡ National team caps and goals as of 22:12, 10 October 2026 (UTC)

Jennifer Miley Falk (born 26 April 1993) is a Swedish professional footballer who plays as a goalkeeper for Damallsvenskan club BK Häcken, and the Sweden national team.

== Club career ==
Falk played six league games for Torslanda IK in the fourth Swedish women's league (Division 2 Norra Götaland) in 2010. After eleven appearances in the third division (Division 1 Norra Götaland) in the 2013 season, she moved to the first division team Jitex BK. As third to last, relegation was avoided, but this followed in the next season. Falk then moved to promoted team Mallbackens IF, for whom in the 2015 season she played all 22 games and helped narrowly escape relegation as third from bottom.

From 2016 she played for Kopparbergs/Göteborg FC, which was renamed to BK Häcken FF in 2021. In her first season she finished fifth with the club and had 15 appearances, more than the other keepers. For the 2017 season, three new goalkeepers were added and Falk only had six appearances. In 2018 Falk had six appearances again. In 2019 Falk was in goal in the cup final and secured first place. In 2020 Falk played all 22 league games, kept 14 clean sheets and thus played a part in the club's first championship. In November 2020 she was awarded player of the month.

In the 2021–22 Champions League she reached the qualifying final against Vålerenga after two wins. Here they were only able to win the away game against Benfica Lisbon. The other games were lost, so they were eliminated as bottom of the group. Falk was in goal in all eight games. In qualifying for the group phase of the 2022–23 Champions League, she competed in the second round, but her team lost twice to Paris Saint-Germain.

Falk remained first-choice goalkeeper as Häcken claimed their second Damallsvenskan title in 2025.

On 7 January 2026, she signed a loan deal with Women's Super League club Liverpool. Falk made her Reds debut on 11 January 2026, playing the full 90 minutes of a 0–0 draw league draw with London City Lionesses.

== International career ==
In October 2014 she received an invitation to the U-23, but was not used. She played her first international match in May 2015 in a 3-1 win against the England U-23 team.

In October 2016, she became the third goalkeeper for the senior national team's international match against Iran, the first of a European team against the Iranians. For the 2019 World Cup she was nominated as the only Swedish player without international caps. She was second goalkeeper but was not used yet.

Falk played her first game for the senior national team at the 2020 Algarve Cup, in which the three nominated goalkeepers each played one game, in the game against Denmark, which was lost 1-2. During qualifications for the Euro 2022 when regular goalkeeper Hedvig Lindahl was injured, Falk was used in the last four qualifying games and kept four clean sheets. With a 2-0 win against Iceland in the penultimate game, the Swedes qualified early for the European Championship finals.

Falk was selected for the 2020 Olympics. She played in the third group game against New Zealand when some regular players were rested after the two opening victories. In the end, like in 2016, the Swedes won the silver medal.

She was nominated for the Euro 2022, but was not used. In the qualifications for the 2023 World Cup she played in goal three times and qualified with her team for the finals in Australia and New Zealand.

On 13 June 2023, she was included in the 23-player squad for the 2023 World Cup. She played in the third group game against Argentina when some regular players were rested. Her team was defeated 1-2 defeat in the semi-final against Spain. With a 2-0 win in the game for third place over Australia she won the bronze medal.

Falk was Sweden's first choice goalkeeper for UEFA Euro 2025, bowing out in the quarter-finals despite Falk saving four penalties in their shootout against England, keeping out three of their first four. Falk took Sweden's fifth penalty herself but missed what would have been the winner. England instead won the shootout in sudden-death, despite Falk saving a fourth spot-kick. In all, Falk saved penalties from Lauren James, Beth Mead, Alex Greenwood and Grace Clinton.

== Personal life ==
Falk lives together with Swedish footballer Pernilla Johansson and they have a daughter.

== Career statistics ==
=== Club ===
As of match played 16 May 2026

Appearances and goals by club, season and competition
Club	Season	League			National cup (Note: Includes Svenska Cupen, Women's FA Cup)		League cup (Note: Includes Women's League Cup)		Continental		Total	
Club	Season	Division	Apps	Goals	Apps	Goals	Apps	Goals	Apps	Goals	Apps	Goals
Torslanda IK	2009	Division 2	2	0	0	0	—		—		2	0
Torslanda IK	2010	Division 2	6	0	0	0	—		—		6	0
Torslanda IK	2011	Division 2	0	0	0	0	—		—		0	0
Torslanda IK	2012	Division 2	0	0	3	0	—		—		3	0
Torslanda IK	2013	Division 1	11	0	1	0	—		—		12	0
Torslanda IK	Total		19	0	4	0	0	0	0	0	23	0
Jitex BK	2013	Damallsvenskan	6	0	2	0	—		—		8	0
Jitex BK	2014	Damallsvenskan	20	0	2	0	—		—		22	0
Jitex BK	Total		26	0	4	0	0	0	0	0	30	0
Mallbackens IF	2015	Damallsvenskan	22	0	2	0	—		—		24	0
Kopparbergs/Göteborg FC	2016	Damallsvenskan	15	0	1	0	—		—		16	0
Kopparbergs/Göteborg FC	2017	Damallsvenskan	4	0	0	0	—		—		4	0
Kopparbergs/Göteborg FC	2018	Damallsvenskan	6	0	6	0	—		—		12	0
Kopparbergs/Göteborg FC	2019	Damallsvenskan	15	0	1	0	—		—		16	0
Kopparbergs/Göteborg FC	2020	Damallsvenskan	22	0	5	0	—		2 (Note: Appearance(s) in UEFA Women's Champions League)	0	29	0
BK Häcken	2021	Damallsvenskan	18	0	6	0	—		8	0	32	0
BK Häcken	2022	Damallsvenskan	22	0	5	0	—		2	0	29	0
BK Häcken	2023	Damallsvenskan	26	0	4	0	—		10	0	40	0
BK Häcken	2024	Damallsvenskan	24	0	1	0	—		2	0	27	0
BK Häcken	2025	Damallsvenskan	23	0	0	0	—		5 (Note: Two appearance in UEFA Women's Champions League; three appearances in UEFA Women's Europa Cup)	0	28	0
BK Häcken	Total		175	0	29	0	0	0	29	0	233	0
Liverpool (loan)	2025–26	Women's Super League	11	0	4	0	0	0	—		15	0
Career total			253	0	43	0	0	0	29	0	324	0

=== International ===
As of match played 9 October 2026

Appearances and goals by national team and year
National team	Year	Apps	Goals
Sweden	2020	5	0
Sweden	2021	6	0
Sweden	2022	3	0
Sweden	2023	6	0
Sweden	2024	4	0
Sweden	2025	15	0
Sweden	2026	7	0
Total		46	0
