= Alejandra Bernabé =

Spanish footballer (born 2001)

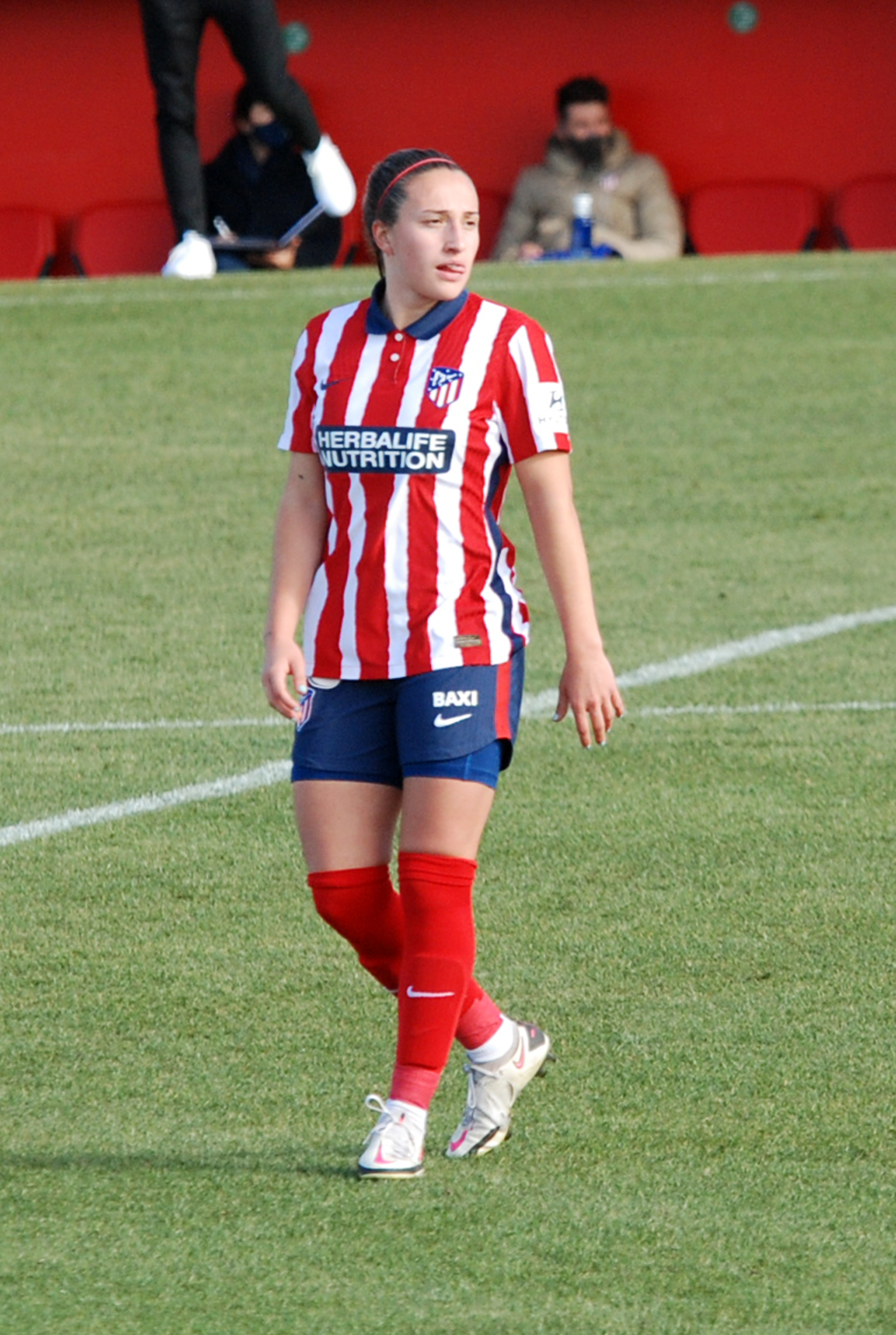
- Bernabé with Atlético Madrid in 2021

Personal information
- Full name: Alejandra Bernabé de Santiago
- Date of birth: 12 November 2001 (age 25)
- Place of birth: Madrid, Spain
- Height: 1.61 m (5 ft 3 in)
- Position: Left back

Team information
- Current team: Liverpool
- Number: 29

Youth career
- 2016–2017: Madrid CFF

Senior career*
Years	Team	Apps	(Gls)
2017–2018	Madrid CFF B		
2018–2019	Madrid CFF	13	(0)
2019–2021	Atlético Madrid B	26	(1)
2020–2023	Atlético Madrid	21	(0)
2021–2022	→ Eibar (loan)	9	(0)
2022–2023	→ Real Sociedad (loan)	8	(0)
2023–2025	Chelsea	1	(0)
2023–2024	→ Real Sociedad (loan)	26	(1)
2025	→ Liverpool (loan)	3	(0)
2025–	Liverpool	17	(0)

International career^{‡}
2017–2018	Spain U17	2	(0)
2019	Spain U19	2	(0)
2022–	Spain	1	(0)
Medal record
Women's football
Representing Spain
UEFA Women's Under-17 Championship
Winner	2018 Lithuania
- * Club domestic league appearances and goals as of 16:01, 28 September 2026 (UTC) ‡ National team caps and goals as of 11 November 2022

Alejandra Bernabé de Santiago (Spanish: [aleˈxandɾa βeɾnaˈβe ðe sanˈtjaɣo]; born 12 November 2001) is a Spanish professional footballer who plays as a left back for Women's Super League club Liverpool, and the Spain national team.

Bernabé started her career with Madrid CFF's B team before playing for the first team. She joined Atlético Madrid and initially played for their B team before going out on loan to Eibar and Real Sociedad. Bernabé joined Chelsea in 2023 and was loaned back to Real Sociedad for one season. In January 2025, she joined Liverpool on loan, before joining them on a permanent transfer in September 2025.

== Club career ==
Bernabé started her career at Madrid CFF youth ranks.

On 23 June 2023, Bernabé was announced at Chelsea on a three-year contract, with Bernabé joining Real Sociedad on loan for the rest of the season. She made 31 appearances in all competitions at Real Sociedad, and made one appearance for Chelsea against Leicester City in December 2024.

On 31 January 2025, Bernabé was announced at Liverpool on a loan deal until the end of the season.

On 4 September 2025, Bernabé was announced at Liverpool on a permanent transfer.

== International career ==
Bernabé represents Spain. She won the 2018 UEFA Women's Under-17 Championship and made her senior debut on 11 November 2022, being a 47th-minute substitution in a 7-0 friendly home win over Argentina.

== Style of play ==
Bernabe normally plays as a left-back, however she can play as a winger on either flank, saying that she likes to "get forward and be more attacking".

== Career statistics ==
=== Club ===
As of match played 27 September 2026

Appearances and goals by club, season and competition
Club	Season	League			National cup (Note: Includes Copa de la Reina, Women's FA Cup)		League cup (Note: Includes Women's League Cup)		Continental (Note: Includes UEFA Women's Champions League)		Other		Total	
Club	Season	Division	Apps	Goals	Apps	Goals	Apps	Goals	Apps	Goals	Apps	Goals	Apps	Goals
Madrid CFF	2018–19	Primera División	13	0	1	0	—		—		—		14	0
Atlético Madrid B	2019–20	Primera Federación	18	0	—		—		—		—		18	0
Atlético Madrid B	2020–21	Primera Federación	8	1	—		—		—		—		8	1
Atlético Madrid B	Total		26	1	0	0	0	0	0	0	0	0	26	1
Atlético Madrid	2020–21	Primera División	21	0	0	0	—		1	0	—		22	0
Eibar	2021–22	Primera División	9	0	1	0	—		—		—		10	0
Real Sociedad (loan)	2022–23	Primera División	21	0	1	0	—		2	0	2 (Note: Appearance in Supercopa de España Femenina)	0	26	0
Real Sociedad (loan)	2023–24	Liga F	26	1	5	0	—		—		—		31	1
Real Sociedad (loan)	Total		47	1	6	0	0	0	2	0	2	0	57	1
Chelsea	2024–25	Women's Super League	1	0	0	0	1	0	0	0	—		2	0
Liverpool (loan)	2024–25	Women's Super League	3	0	1	0	0	0	—		—		4	0
Liverpool	2025–26	Women's Super League	13	0	4	0	2	0	—		—		19	0
Liverpool	2026–27	Women's Super League	4	0	0	0	0	0	—		—		4	0
Liverpool	Total		17	0	4	0	2	0	0	0	0	0	23	0
Career total			137	2	13	0	3	0	3	0	2	0	158	2

=== International ===
As of match played 11 November 2022

Appearances and goals by national team and year
National team	Year	Apps	Goals
Spain	2022	1	0
Total		1	0

== Honours ==
Atlético Madrid

- Supercopa de España Femenina: 2020–21
