= Faye Kirby =

English footballer (born 2004)

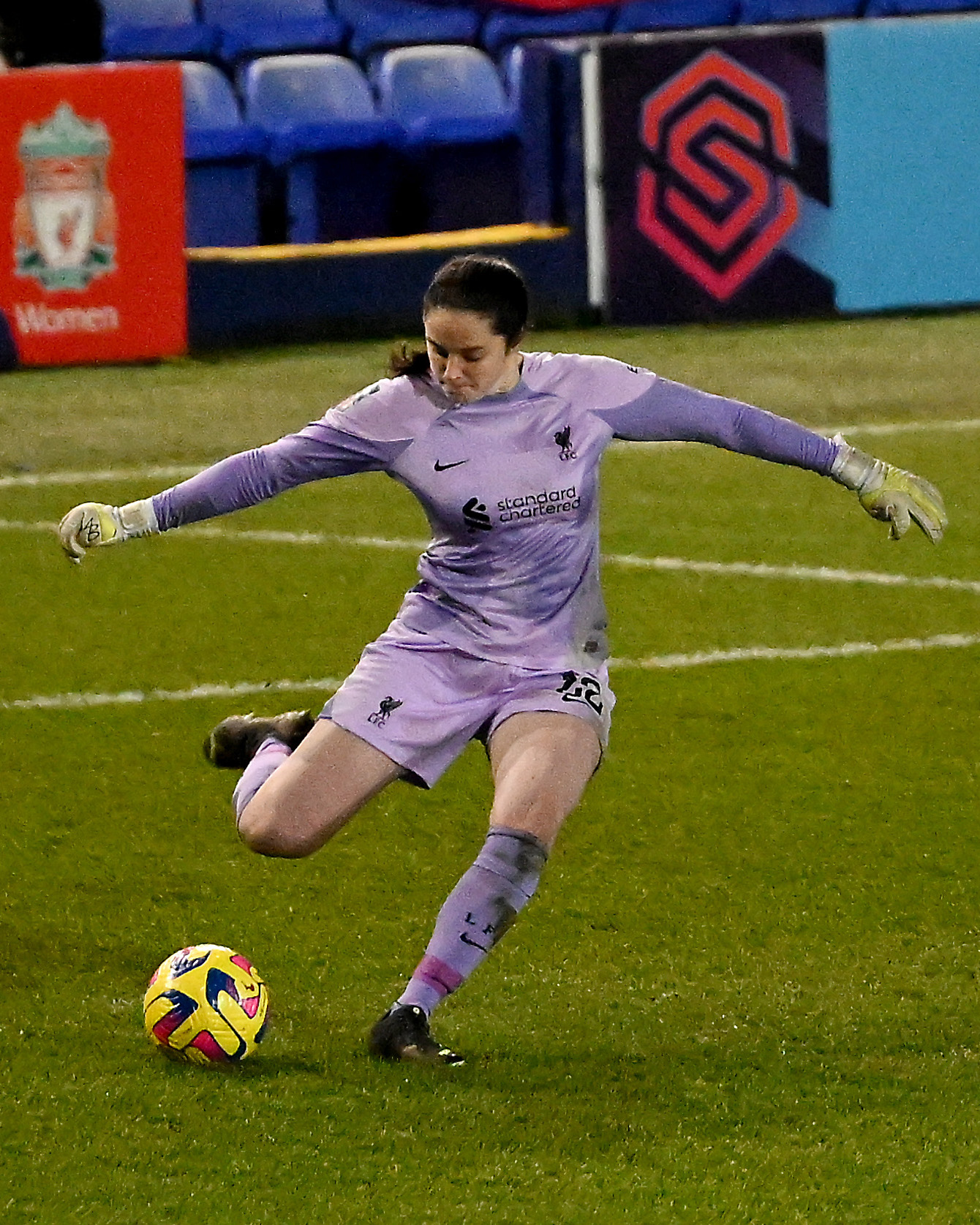
- Faye Kirby playing for Liverpool against West Ham United in 2023

Personal information
- Full name: Faye Mary Kirby
- Date of birth: 5 April 2004 (age 22)
- Place of birth: Crosby, Liverpool
- Height: 1.69 m (5 ft 7 in)
- Position: Goalkeeper

Team information
- Current team: Liverpool
- Number: 22

Youth career
- 2006–2011: Maghull Football Club
- 2006–2013: Litherland Tigers Junior F.C
- 2013–2022: Everton F.C

Senior career*
Years	Team	Apps	(Gls)
2022–	Liverpool F.C	11	(0)
2023–2024	→ Aberdeen F.C (loan)	7	(0)

International career^{‡}
2019–2020	England U16	1	(0)
2020–2021	England U17	1	(0)
2021–2022	England U18	3	(0)
2022–2023	England U19	2	(0)
2025–	England U23	1	(0)
- * Club domestic league appearances and goals as of 16:02, 17 December 2025 (UTC) ‡ National team caps and goals as of 23:41, 27 October 2025 (UTC)

Faye Mary Kirby (born 5 April 2004) is an English professional footballer who plays as a goalkeeper for Women's Super League club Liverpool and the England U23 team.

== Club career ==
=== Early career ===
Faye Kirby attended Great Crosby Catholic Primary School for her primary school education. She joined St. Mary's College, Crosby for secondary school education, where she became the first ever girl in the history of the school to play a competitive game of football. She began her career playing grassroots football for Maghull Football Club and Litherland Tigers Junior, playing against all-male teams who were two years older than herself, before joining Everton Academy at age 7. Kirby remained at Everton Academy for eleven seasons before she completed a move to Liverpool in September 2022.

=== Liverpool ===
Kirby made her debut for Liverpool in the League Cup against West Ham United on 25 January 2023. She later made her league debut against Chelsea on 3 May 2023 where she earned player of the match for her performance. Kirby started another two times for Liverpool in the 2022–23 season and earned the team's Young Player of the Year Award, Performance of the Season and the Save of the Season Award. On 29 July 2025, it was announced that she had signed a new contract to extend her time with the club.

==== Aberdeen (loan) ====
At the start of the 2023–24 season, Kirby joined Aberdeen F.C. on loan, to play in the Scottish Premier League, and was due to stay there for the first half of the 2023–24 season.

On 13 August 2023, Kirby made her debut for Aberdeen against Motherwell, with the team winning 3–2. On 13 September 2023, against Hibernian, Kirby attained a complete rupture of her ACL, in the 55th minute. The ACL injury ended Kirby's season prematurely due to the long rehabilitation process from the injury. During Kirby's short time at Aberdeen, she was able to attain two clean sheets – one on 3 September 2023 against Spartans and the other on 10 September 2023 against Hamilton Academical.

== International career ==
Kirby has been selected to play for England U16, U17, U18 and U19 teams. She has played against a number of countries while playing internationally, such as: Slovenia, Switzerland, Belarus, the US, the Netherlands and Spain.

On 27 October 2025, Kirby made her debut for the England under-23 team in a 1–1 draw with Portugal.

== Career statistics ==
=== Club ===
As of match played 27 September 2026

Appearances and goal by club, season and competition
Club	Season	League			National Cup		League Cup		Total	
Club	Season	Division	Apps	Goals	Apps	Goals	Apps	Goals	Apps	Goals
Liverpool	2022–23	Women's Super League	3	0	0	0	2	0	5	0
Liverpool	2023–24	Women's Super League	0	0	0	0	0	0	0	0
Liverpool	2024–25	Women's Super League	0	0	0	0	0	0	0	0
Liverpool	2025–26	Women's Super League	8	0	0	0	3	0	11	0
Liverpool	2026–27	Women's Super League	0	0	0	0	1	0	1	0
Liverpool	Total		11	0	0	0	6	0	17	0
Aberdeen (loan)	2023–24	SWPL	7	0	0	0	0	0	7	0
Career total			18	0	0	0	6	0	24	0
