= 2025–26 Liverpool F.C. Women season =

37th season in existence of Liverpool F.C. Women

Liverpool
2025–26 season
- Owner: Fenway Sports Group
- Chairman: Tom Werner
- Head coach: Gareth Taylor
- Stadium: BrewDog Stadium; Anfield (selected home matches)
- Super League: 11th
- FA Cup: Semi-finals
- League Cup: Quarter-finals
- Top goalscorer: League: Beata Olsson (6); All: Beata Olsson (10)
- Highest home attendance: 11,904 (v. Everton, Super League, 7 September 2025)
- Lowest home attendance: 2,018 (v. Sunderland, League Cup, 24 September 2025)
- Average home league attendance: 4,760
- Biggest win: 6–0 v. London Bees (A); FA Cup, 18 January 2026
- Biggest defeat: 1–9 v. Chelsea (H); League Cup, 21 December 2025
Home colours	Away colours	Third colours

The 2025–26 season is Liverpool Football Club Women's 37th season in their history and their fourth consecutive season in the top flight of English football. In addition to the domestic league, the club is also participating in the Women's FA Cup and the Women's League Cup.

== Season summary ==
=== Club ===
This is the first season since 2017–18 without captain Niamh Fahey, who retired from professional football after her contract expired.

On 11 July 2025, Diogo Jota's squad number 20 was retired across all levels to commemorate his death a week prior.

In April 2025 it was reported that former men's Head of Fitness under Jürgen Klopp, Andy O’Boyle would return to the club to replace Russ Frasier as managing director following a two-year spell at Manchester United as Deputy Football Director.

On 8 August 2025, Gareth Taylor was appointed as the team's new head coach. His former assistant manager at Manchester City Chad Gribble was appointed as joint assistant manager alongside Amber Whiteley replacing Scott Rodgers.

On 15 August 2025, former Carlisle United Director of football, Rob Clarkson joined the club as the first Head of Recruitment for the Women's side.

On 20 August 2025, former Liverpool men's goalkeeper Andy Lonergan joined the staff as goalkeeping coach.

On 3 September 2025, Grace Fisk was appointed as new club captain.

On 20 September 2025, the club announced the passing of former manager Matt Beard. Tributes and condolences were paid by the football club, while the away league game on 21 September against Aston Villa was postponed.

On 3 October 2025, former club captain Niamh Fahey was appointed the first ever technical co-ordinator, overseeing the technical direction of the club's women's programme.

On 23 October 2025, the club announced that first team kit manager Jonathan Humble passed away following sudden illness.

=== Transfers ===
Olivia Smith transferred to Arsenal for a world record fee of £1 million.

Liverpool broke their transfer record fee they previously paid for Smith when they signed Republic of Ireland international Denise O'Sullivan from North Carolina Courage.

=== September - October ===
Liverpool lost their first five opening league matches including two defeats to at Anfield to both Everton and Manchester City. The team had better luck in Group B of the 2025–26 Women's League Cup, winning their opening two matches against Sunderland and Durham.

Both Marie Höbinger and Sophie Román Haug would miss significant time out with ACL injuries.

=== November–December ===
With injuries plaguing the squad, Liverpool remained winless in the league but managed to accrue 3 points before the winter break against Brighton, Chelsea and West Ham.

In the 2025–26 Women's League Cup Quarter Finals, they were beaten heavily 9–1 by Chelsea.

Beata Olsson, continued her impressive start by scoring her eighth goal of the season in her first twelve starts.

=== January–February ===
Liverpool started the post winter break campaign with a goalless draw against London City Lionesses.

On 18 January 2026,they beat London Bees in the FA Cup fourth round game against London Bees 6–0. Four of the goals came from new signings Martha Thomas, Denise O'Sullivan and Alice Bergström. In the same fixture, Maizie Trueman became the club's youngest ever player to appear in a competitive fixture, making her debut starting at the age of 16 years and 88 days.

Liverpool claimed their first league win of the season against Spurs on 25 January 2026, with two late goals from Mia Enderby.

A fortnight later after a defeat away to Manchester United, Liverpool beat Aston Villa comprehensively 4–1 at home to move into 11th place. Mia Enderby scored her third league goal in three games. Martha Thomas and Grace Fisk scored their first league goals of the season for the club. While new signing Aurélie Csillag scored her maiden goal.

On 12 February 2026, manager Gareth Taylor was awarded the league's Manager of the Month award for January.

Liverpool's final two games before the March internationals saw Liverpool lose 2–0 to Chelsea in the league. Goals from Mia Enderby and Beata Olsson saw them beat Everton in the FA Cup fifth round a week later.

=== March–May ===
Beata Olsson's sixth league goal of the season and a late Ceri Holland penalty gave Liverpool a 2-0 win over Leicester City.

Following a goalless draw away to Brighton on 26 March, a Ceri Holland brace helped the team to secure their first away win of the season in the league against Everton in the Merseyside Derby at Goodison Park.

A Zara Shaw winner sent Liverpool through in FA Cup Quarterfinals against Charlton Liverpool lost all their remaining League and Cup games to end the season.

== Squad ==
As of 3 February 2026

No.	Player	Nationality	Date of birth (age)	Signed from	Apps	Goals	Assists
Goalkeepers
1	Rachael Laws	(England)	5 November 1990 (aged 35)	(England) Reading	106	0	0
22	Faye Kirby	(England)	5 April 2004 (aged 22)	(England) Everton	16	0	0
28	Jennifer Falk (on loan)	(Sweden)	26 April 1993 (aged 33)	(Sweden) BK Häcken	7	0	0
Defenders
2	Lucy Parry	(England)	7 May 2004 (aged 22)	(England) LFC Academy	39	0	0
3	Gemma Evans	(Wales)	1 August 1996 (aged 29)	(England) Manchester United	36	2	0
4	Grace Fisk (captain)	(England)	5 January 1998 (aged 28)	(England) West Ham United	67	3	3
5	Risa Shimizu (on loan)	(Japan)	15 June 1996 (aged 30)	(England) Manchester City	15	1	1
16	Lily Woodham	(Wales)	3 September 2000 (aged 25)	(United States) Seattle Reign	15	0	3
17	Jenna Clark	(Scotland)	29 September 2001 (aged 24)	(Scotland) Glasgow City	72	3	2
23	Gemma Bonner	(England)	13 July 1991 (aged 34)	(United States) Racing Louisville	180	13	5
25	Alice Bergström	(Sweden)	3 February 2003 (aged 23)	(Sweden) BK Häcken	6	3	0
29	Alejandra Bernabé	(Spain)	12 November 2001 (aged 24)	(England) Chelsea	15	0	2
Midfielders
6	Denise O'Sullivan	(Republic of Ireland)	4 February 1994 (aged 32)	(United States) North Carolina Courage	6	1	0
8	Fūka Nagano	(Japan)	9 March 1999 (aged 27)	(United States) North Carolina Courage	85	1	8
14	Marie Höbinger	(Austria)	1 July 2001 (aged 24)	(Switzerland) Zürich	59	9	10
15	Sofie Lundgaard	(Denmark)	29 May 2002 (aged 24)	(Denmark) Fortuna Hjørring	43	0	0
18	Ceri Holland	(Wales)	12 December 1997 (aged 28)	(United States) Kansas Jayhawks	126	11	14
19	Kirsty Maclean	(Scotland)	12 April 2005 (aged 21)	(Scotland) Rangers	16	0	1
24	Sam Kerr	(Scotland)	17 April 1999 (aged 27)	(Germany) Bayern Munich	24	2	1
36	Zara Shaw	(England)	6 June 2007 (aged 19)	(England) LFC Academy	9	1	1
Forwards
7	Cornelia Kapocs	(Sweden)	13 July 2000 (aged 25)	(Sweden) Linköping	47	6	4
10	Sophie Román Haug	(Norway)	4 June 1999 (aged 27)	(Italy) Roma	50	14	7
11	Beata Olsson	(Sweden)	31 January 2001 (aged 25)	(Sweden) Kristianstads DFF	15	9	1
13	Mia Enderby	(England)	31 May 2005 (aged 21)	(England) Sheffield United	64	12	7
21	Anna Jøsendal	(Norway)	29 April 2001 (aged 25)	(Sweden) Hammarby	0	0	0
27	Aurélie Csillag	(Switzerland)	24 January 2003 (aged 23)	(Germany) SC Freiburg	5	1	0
31	Martha Thomas (on loan)	(Scotland)	31 May 1996 (aged 30)	(England) Tottenham Hotspur	5	2	0

=== New contracts ===
Date	Pos.	No.	Player	Until	Ref.
24 June 2025	MF	18	(Wales) Ceri Holland	Undisclosed	
25 July 2025	GK	1	(England) Rachael Laws	Undisclosed	
29 July 2025	GK	22	(England) Faye Kirby	Undisclosed	
31 July 2025	FW	13	(England) Mia Enderby	Undisclosed	
1 August 2025	MF	8	(Japan) Fūka Nagano	Undisclosed	
4 August 2025	DF	23	(England) Gemma Bonner	Undisclosed	
5 August 2025	DF	34	(England) Hannah Silcock	Undisclosed	
5 August 2025	MF	36	(England) Zara Shaw	Undisclosed (Note: First professional contract.)	
20 August 2025	FW	9	(Republic of Ireland) Leanne Kiernan	Undisclosed	

== Transfers ==
=== In ===
Date	Pos.	No.	Player	From	Fee	Ref.
14 July 2025	MF	19	(Scotland) Kirsty Maclean	(Scotland) Rangers	Undisclosed	
18 July 2025	GK	12	(Germany) Rafaela Borggräfe	(Germany) SC Freiburg	Free transfer	
18 July 2025	MF	24	(Scotland) Sam Kerr	(Germany) Bayern Munich	Undisclosed	
28 July 2025	DF	16	(Wales) Lily Woodham	(United States) Seattle Reign	Free transfer	
4 September 2025	FW	11	(Sweden) Beata Olsson	(Sweden) Kristianstads DFF	Undisclosed	
4 September 2025	DF	29	(Spain) Alejandra Bernabé	(England) Chelsea	Undisclosed	
2 January 2026	DF	25	(Sweden) Alice Bergström	(Sweden) BK Häcken	Undisclosed	
9 January 2026	FW	21	(Norway) Anna Jøsendal	(Sweden) Hammarby	Undisclosed	
17 January 2026	MF	6	(Republic of Ireland) Denise O'Sullivan	(United States) North Carolina Courage	£300,000	
19 January 2026	FW	27	(Switzerland) Aurélie Csillag	(Germany) SC Freiburg	Undisclosed	
▼ Spending: £300,000 + Undisclosed fees

=== Out ===
Date	Pos.	No.	Player	To	Fee	Ref.
30 June 2025	DF	5	(Republic of Ireland) Niamh Fahey	Retired		
30 June 2025	DF	6	(England) Jasmine Matthews	(England) Burnley	Free transfer	
30 June 2025	DF	12	(Jamaica) Taylor Hinds	(England) Arsenal	Free transfer	
30 June 2025	GK	16	(Australia) Teagan Micah	(France) Lyon	Free transfer	
30 June 2025	FW	20	(Belgium) Yana Daniëls	(England) Burnley	Free transfer	
17 July 2025	FW	11	(Canada) Olivia Smith	(England) Arsenal	£1,000,000	
▲ Income: £1,000,000

=== Loans in ===
Date	Pos.	No.	Player	From	Date until	Ref.
4 September 2025	DF	5	(Japan) Risa Shimizu	(England) Manchester City	End of season	
4 September 2025	MF	6	(Poland) Emilia Szymczak	(Spain) Barcelona B	16 January 2026 (Note: On 16 January 2026, Szymczak returned from Barcelona B due to injury.)	
7 January 2026	GK	28	(Sweden) Jennifer Falk	(Sweden) BK Häcken	End of season	
17 January 2026	FW	31	(Scotland) Martha Thomas	(England) Tottenham Hotspur	End of season	

=== Loans out ===
Date	Pos.	No.	Player	To	Date until	Ref.
22 January 2026	DF	34	(England) Hannah Silcock	(England) Birmingham City	End of season	
29 January 2026	FW	9	(Republic of Ireland) Leanne Kiernan	(England) Nottingham Forest	End of season	
3 February 2026	GK	12	(Germany) Rafaela Borggräfe	(Germany) Bayer Leverkusen	End of season	

== Pre-season and friendlies ==
On 25 July 2025, Liverpool announced their first pre-season fixture against Manchester United in Leigh. Five days later, two behind-closed-doors friendlies against Aston Villa and Durham were confirmed.

Win Draw Loss Fixtures

9 August 2025 Friendly	Aston Villa	5–1	Liverpool	Bodymoor Heath
14:00 BST	Hanson 18'; Daly 27' (pen.); Mullett 38'; Baijings 49'; Mayling 61'	Report	Höbinger 12'	Stadium: Bodymoor Heath Training Ground; Attendance: 0 (behind closed doors)

17 August 2025 Friendly	Liverpool	0–1	Durham	Liverpool
13:30 BST		Report	Hepple 80'	Stadium: Melwood; Attendance: 0 (behind closed doors)

20 August 2025 Friendly	Manchester United	2–2	Liverpool	Leigh
19:00 BST	Awujo 5'; Toone 90'	Report	Holland 27'; Kapocs 49'	Stadium: Leigh Sports Village

24 August 2025 Friendly	Liverpool	0–3	West Ham United	Liverpool
13:00 BST		Report	Morgan 31'; Piubel 50', 53'	Stadium: Melwood; Attendance: 0 (behind closed doors)

31 August 2025 Friendly	Birmingham City	0–1	Liverpool	Birmingham
14:00 BST		Report		Stadium: Wast Hills Training Ground; Attendance: 0 (behind closed doors)

== Competitions ==
=== Overall record ===
Competition	First match	Last match	Starting round	Final position	Record							
Competition	First match	Last match	Starting round	Final position	Pld	W	D	L	GF	GA	GD	Win %
Women's Super League	7 September 2025	May 2026	Matchday 1	TBD	16	2	4	10	15	27	−12	12.50
Women's FA Cup	18 January 2026	TBD	Fourth round	TBD	2	2	0	0	8	1	+7	100.00
Women's League Cup	24 September 2025	21 December 2025	Group stage	Quarter-finals	4	3	0	1	12	11	+1	75.00
Total					22	7	4	11	35	39	−4	31.82

Last updated: 15 February 2026
Source: Soccerway

=== Women's Super League ===
==== League table ====
Pos	Team	Pld	W	D	L	GF	GA	GD	Pts	Qualification or relegation
8	Everton	22	7	2	13	25	37	−12	23	
9	Aston Villa	22	5	5	12	28	48	−20	20	
10	West Ham United	22	5	4	13	20	45	−25	19	
11	Liverpool	22	4	5	13	21	34	−13	17	
12	Leicester City (R)	22	2	3	17	11	52	−41	9	Consigned to relegation play-off

Source: WSL League Table
Rules for classification: 1) Points; 2) Goal difference; 3) Number of goals scored.
(R) Relegated

==== Results summary ====
Overall								Home						Away					
Pld	W	D	L	GF	GA	GD	Pts	W	D	L	GF	GA	GD	W	D	L	GF	GA	GD
16	2	4	10	15	27	−12	10	2	3	3	10	11	−1	0	1	7	5	16	−11

Last updated: 15 February 2026.
Source: Soccerway

==== Results by round ====
Round	1	2	4	5	6	7	8	9	10	3^{1}	11	12	13	14	15	16	17	18	19	20	21	22
Ground	H	A	H	A	H	A	H	H	A	A	A	H	H	A	H	A	H	A	A	H	A	H
Result	L	L	L	L	L	L	D	D	L	L	D	D	W	L	W	L	W	D	W	L	L	L
Position	10	10	11	11	11	11	11	12	12	12	12	12	12	12	11	11	10	10	10	11	11	11
Points	0	0	0	0	0	0	1	2	2	2	3	4	7	7	10	10	13	14	17	17	17	17

Source: The Football Association
A = Away; H = Home; W = Win; D = Draw; L = Loss; P = Postponed
Notes:
- ^{1} Matchday 3 (v. Aston Villa) was postponed due to the passing of former Liverpool manager Matt Beard.

==== Matches ====
The league fixtures were released on 25 July 2025.

Win Draw Loss Fixtures

7 September 2025 1	Liverpool	1–4	Everton	Liverpool
12:00 BST	Kapocs 12'; Nagano (yellow card) 62'	Report	Vignola 24', 54', 56'; Snoeijs 45+4'; Van Gool (yellow card) 49'	Stadium: Anfield; Attendance: 11,904; Referee: Melissa Burgin

14 September 2025 2	Leicester City	1–0	Liverpool	Leicester
12:00 BST	O'Brien (yellow card) 7' (yellow-red card) 56'; Van Egmond 59'; Leitzig (yellow card) 90+2'	Report	Evans (yellow card) 39'	Stadium: King Power Stadium; Attendance: 1,820; Referee: Lisa Benn
Note: Fixture was initially scheduled for a 15:00 kick-off, but was moved for live Sky Sports broadcast.

28 September 2025 4	Liverpool	0–2	Manchester United	St Helens
12:00 BST	Kapocs (yellow card) 21'; Haug (yellow card) 27'	Report	Miyazawa 4'; Riviere (yellow card) 42'; Toone 45+2'	Stadium: St Helens Stadium; Attendance: 3,022; Referee: Megan Wilson
Note: Fixture was initially scheduled for a 14:00 kick-off, but was moved for live Sky Sports broadcast.

5 October 2025 5	London City Lionesses	1–0	Liverpool	Bromley
11:55 BST	Geyoro (yellow card) 18'; Parris (yellow card) 24'; Linari 89' (pen.)	Report	Borggräfe (yellow card) 86'; Höbinger (yellow card) 90+7'	Stadium: Hayes Lane; Attendance: 2,471; Referee: Emily Heaslip
Note: Fixture was initially scheduled for a 14:00 kick-off, but was moved for live Sky Sports broadcast.

12 October 2025 6	Liverpool	1–2	Manchester City	Liverpool
16:45 BST	Kapocs 52'	Report	Greenwood (yellow card) 55'; Beney 64'; Fujino 86'	Stadium: Anfield; Attendance: 9,387; Referee: William Davis
Note: Fixture was initially scheduled for a 14:00 kick-off, but was moved for live Sky Sports broadcast.

2 November 2025 7	Tottenham Hotspur	2–1	Liverpool	Leyton
12:00 GMT	Naz (yellow card) 2'; Koga 19'; England 52'; Hunt (yellow card) 90+18'	Report	Olsson 11'; Holland (yellow card) 61'	Stadium: Brisbane Road; Attendance: 1,674; Referee: Sophie Dennington
Note: Fixture was initially scheduled for a 14:00 kick-off, but was moved for live Sky Sports broadcast.

9 November 2025 8	Liverpool	1–1	Brighton & Hove Albion	St Helens
12:00 GMT	Olsson 26'; Nagano (yellow card) 72'; Shimizu (yellow card) 73'; Kirby (yellow card) 88'; Kapocs (yellow card) 90+2'	Report	Seike (yellow card) 34'; Kafaji 90+3'	Stadium: St Helens Stadium; Attendance: 2,423; Referee: Phoebe Cross
Note: Fixture was initially scheduled for a 14:00 kick-off, but was moved for live Sky Sports broadcast.

16 November 2025 9	Liverpool	1–1	Chelsea	St Helens
12:00 GMT	Olsson 33'; Fisk (yellow card) 75'	Report	Thompson 9'	Stadium: St Helens Stadium; Attendance: 3,688; Referee: Edward Duckworth
Note: Fixture was initially scheduled for a 14:00 kick-off, but was moved for live Sky Sports broadcast.

6 December 2025 10	Arsenal	2–1	Liverpool	Holloway
12:00 GMT	Smith 16'; Foord (yellow card) 64'; Blackstenius 87'	Report	Olsson 30'; Clark (yellow card) 90+2'	Stadium: Emirates Stadium; Attendance: 34,345; Referee: Kirsty Dowle
Note: Fixture was initially scheduled for a 12:30 kick-off, but was moved for live Sky Sports broadcast.

11 December 2025 3	Aston Villa	3–0	Liverpool	Birmingham
19:00 GMT	Daly 1', 77'; Patten (yellow card) 25'; Hanson 28'; Kearns (yellow card) 69'	Report	Parry (yellow card) 60'; Woodham (yellow card) 69'	Stadium: Villa Park; Attendance: 3,210; Referee: Adewunmi Soneye
Note: Fixture was initially scheduled for a 14:00 kick-off on 21 September, but was moved to 12:00 for live Sky Sports broadcast, and later postponed due to the passing of former Liverpool manager Matt Beard.

14 December 2025 11	West Ham United	2–2	Liverpool	Dagenham
11:55 GMT	Ueki 57'; Csiki 68', (yellow card) 83'	Report	Bonner (red card) 19'; Silcock (yellow card) 44'; Enderby 59'; Olsson (yellow card) 60', (goal) 87'; Kirby (yellow card) 90+3'	Stadium: Victoria Road; Attendance: 1,237; Referee: Abigail Byrne
Note: Fixture was initially scheduled for 13 December, but was moved for live Sky Sports broadcast.

11 January 2026 12	Liverpool	0–0	London City Lionesses	St Helens
14:30 GMT	Parry (yellow card) 90+2'	Report	Sangaré (yellow card) 38'; Linari (yellow card) 67'; Asllani (yellow card) 74'; Pérez (yellow card) 90+1'	Stadium: St Helens Stadium; Attendance: 2,419; Referee: Phoebe Cross
Note: Fixture was initially scheduled for a 14:00 kick-off, but was moved for live BBC iPlayer broadcast.

25 January 2026 13	Liverpool	2–0	Tottenham Hotspur	St Helens
11:55 GMT	O'Sullivan (yellow card) 70'; Koga 90+4' (o.g.); Enderby 90+5'	Report	Spence (yellow card) 82'	Stadium: St Helens Stadium; Attendance: 2,653; Referee: Grace Lowe
Note: Fixture was initially scheduled for a 14:00 kick-off, but was moved for live Sky Sports broadcast.

1 February 2026 14	Manchester United	3–1	Liverpool	Leigh
11:55 GMT	Malard (yellow card) 24'; Naalsund 52', 60'; Rolfö 87'; George (yellow card) 90+4'	Report	Bergström (yellow card) 30', (goal) 59'	Stadium: Leigh Sports Village; Attendance: 4,502; Referee: Phoebe Cross
Note: Fixture was initially scheduled for a 13:00 kick-off, but was moved for live Sky Sports broadcast.

8 February 2026 15	Liverpool	4–1	Aston Villa	St Helens
12:00 GMT	Enderby 9'; Thomas 14'; O'Sullivan (yellow card) 72'; Fisk 83'; Csillag 90+7'	Report	Parker (yellow card) 38'; Taylor 41'; Grant (yellow card) 90+6'	Stadium: St Helens Stadium; Attendance: 2,587; Referee: Megan Wilson
Note: Fixture was initially scheduled for a 14:00 kick-off, but was moved for live Sky Sports broadcast.

15 February 2026 16	Chelsea	2–0	Liverpool	Kingston upon Thames
12:00 GMT	Nüsken 40'; James 65', (yellow card) 79'	Report		Stadium: Kingsmeadow; Attendance: 3,973; Referee: Sophie Dennington
Note: Fixture was initially scheduled for a 14:00 kick-off, but was moved for live Sky Sports broadcast.

15 March 2026 17	Liverpool	2–0	Leicester City	St Helens
14:00	Olsson 10'; Holland 89' (pen.)	Report	McLoughlin (yellow card) 30'; Thibaud (yellow card) 87'	Stadium: Totally Wicked Stadium; Attendance: 2,478; Referee: Megan Wilson

22 March 2026 18	Brighton & Hove Albion	0–0	Liverpool	Crawley
12:00 GMT	Kafaji (yellow card) 58'; Mpomé (yellow card) 71'	Report	Csillag (yellow card) 90+2'	Stadium: Broadfield Stadium; Attendance: 2,316; Referee: Adewunmi Soneye
Note: Fixture was originally scheduled kick off at 14:00, but was moved for live Sky Sports broadcasting.

28 March 2026 19	Everton	2–3	Liverpool	Liverpool
12:00 GMT	Galli 64'; Kramžar 90+1'; Mace (yellow card) 90+6'	Report	Holland 11', 41' (pen.), (yellow card) 90+6'; Fernández 20' (o.g.); Kapocs (yellow card) 63'; Fisk (yellow card) 15' (yellow-red card) 65'; Falk (yellow card) 90+4'	Stadium: Goodison Park; Attendance: 5,292; Referee: Phoebe Cross

26 April 2026 20	Liverpool	0–1	West Ham United	St Helens
14:00 BST	Bernabé (yellow card) 25'	Report	Kapocs 6' (o.g.)	Stadium: St Helens Stadium; Attendance: 2,720; Referee: Emily Heaslip

3 May 2026 21	Manchester City	1–0	Liverpool	Manchester
12:00 BST	Knaak 90+1'	Report	Nagano (yellow card) 51'; Holland (yellow card) 71'	Stadium: Academy Stadium; Attendance: 4,869; Referee: Kirsty Dowle

16 May 2026 22	Liverpool	1–3	Arsenal	Liverpool
13:00 BST	Shaw 74'	Report	Russo 21', 37'; Caldentey 32'; Wubben-Moy (yellow card) 41'	Stadium: Anfield; Attendance: 15,047; Referee: Emily Heaslip

=== Women's FA Cup ===
As a Women's Super League side, Liverpool entered the FA Cup in the fourth round, and were drawn away to fourth-tier National League Division One South East side London Bees. In the fifth round, they were drawn at home to Super League club Everton.

Win Draw Loss Fixtures

18 January 2026 Fourth round	London Bees	0–6	Liverpool	Edgware
13:00 GMT		Report	O'Sullivan 6'; Enderby 13'; Thomas 33'; Evans 54'; Bergström 87', 88'	Stadium: The Hive Stadium; Attendance: 881; Referee: Aimee Keir

22 February 2026 Fifth round	Liverpool	2–1	Everton	St Helens
16:30 GMT	Enderby 34'; Olsson 45'; Csillag (yellow card) 88'	Report	Mace (yellow card) 55'; Falk 72' (o.g.); Brosnan (yellow card) 88'	Stadium: St Helens Stadium; Attendance: 3,594; Referee: Adewunmi Soneye

5 April 2026 Quarter-finals	Charlton Athletic	0–1 (a.e.t.)	Liverpool	Charlton
14:30 BST	Ross (yellow card) 70'; N'Dow (yellow card) 87'; Whitehouse (yellow card) 110'	Report	Shaw 115'; Thomas (yellow card) 96'	Stadium: The Valley; Attendance: 2,164; Referee: Megan Wilson

5 April 2026 Semi-finals	Liverpool	2–3	Brighton & Hove Albion	St Helens
12:15 BST	O'Sullivan 11'; Olsson 22'; Holland (yellow card) 48'; O'Sullivan (yellow card) 56'; Csillag (yellow card) 82'	Report	Vanegas 23'; Haley 54'; Noordam 90+5'	Stadium: St Helen's Stadium; Attendance: 3,949; Referee: Kirsty Dowle

=== Women's League Cup ===
As one of the Women's Super League clubs not participating in European competitions, Liverpool entered the League Cup in the group stage.

==== Group stage ====
The group stage draw was held on 31 July 2025. Liverpool were drawn into Group B with Durham, Sheffield United and Sunderland.

Pos	Team	Pld	W	PW	PL	L	GF	GA	GD	Pts	Qualification
1	Liverpool	3	3	0	0	0	11	2	+9	9	Advanced to knockout stage
2	Sheffield United	3	1	1	0	1	3	5	−2	5	
3	Durham	3	0	0	2	1	3	4	−1	2	
4	Sunderland	3	0	1	0	2	1	7	−6	2	

Source: Women's League Cup
Rules for classification: 1) Points; 2) Goal difference; 3) Number of goals scored; 4) Number of wins; 5) Head-to-head record

Round	1	2	3
Ground	H	A	A
Result	W	W	W
Position	1	1	1
Points	3	6	9

Source: The Football Association
A = Away; H = Home; W = Win; D = Draw; L = Loss

Win Draw Loss Fixtures

24 September 2025 1	Liverpool	5–0	Sunderland	St Helens
19:00 BST	Evans 7'; Clark 21', (yellow card) 83'; Shimizu 41'; Haug 71', 88'	Report		Stadium: St Helens Stadium; Attendance: 2,018; Referee: Abby Dearden

16 October 2025 2	Durham	1–2	Liverpool	Durham
19:00 BST	Foster 38'; Robson (yellow card) 48'	Report	Holland 27'; Enderby (yellow card) 86'; Kerr 86'	Stadium: Maiden Castle Sports Centre; Attendance: 844; Referee: Lucy May

22 November 2025 3	Sheffield United	1–4	Liverpool	Sheffield
18:30 GMT	Thomas 44'; Aherne (yellow card) 90+2'	Report	Olsson 2', 42', 57'; Enderby 64'	Stadium: Bramall Lane; Attendance: 2,597; Referee: Lucy May

==== Knockout stage ====
As a group winners in the group stage, Liverpool entered the quarter-finals, and were drawn at home to Super League club Chelsea.

Win Draw Loss Fixtures

21 December 2025 Quarter-finals	Liverpool	1–9	Chelsea	St Helens
13:00 GMT	Olsson (yellow card) 27'; Clark 72'	Report	Kerr 13', 17'; Kaptein 21'; Beever-Jones 32'; Kaneryd 53', 73', 80'; Nüsken 76'; Bright 86'	Stadium: St Helens Stadium; Attendance: 2,467; Referee: Grace Lowe

== Statistics ==
As of match played 16 May 2026

=== Appearances ===
Players with no appearances are not included on the list, italics indicate a loaned in player.

No.	Pos	Nat	Player	Total		Super League		FA Cup		League Cup	
No.	Pos	Nat	Player	Apps	Goals	Apps	Goals	Apps	Goals	Apps	Goals
2	DF	(England) ENG	Lucy Parry	9	0	4+1	0	1+0	0	1+2	0
3	DF	(Wales) WAL	Gemma Evans	16	2	8+3	0	1+0	1	4+0	1
4	DF	(England) ENG	Grace Fisk	23	1	19+0	1	2+0	0	2+0	0
5	DF	(Japan) JPN	Risa Shimizu	20	1	11+3	0	3+1	0	2+0	1
6	MF	(Republic of Ireland) IRL	Denise O'Sullivan	13	2	7+2	0	4+0	2	0+0	0
7	FW	(Sweden) SWE	Cornelia Kapocs	28	2	20+1	2	3+0	0	4+0	0
8	MF	(Japan) JPN	Fūka Nagano	27	0	20+0	0	3+0	0	4+0	0
10	FW	(Norway) NOR	Sophie Román Haug	7	2	1+4	0	0+0	0	1+1	2
11	FW	(Sweden) SWE	Beata Olsson	23	10	13+3	5	2+1	2	3+1	3
13	FW	(England) ENG	Mia Enderby	30	6	16+6	3	3+1	2	3+1	1
14	MF	(Austria) AUT	Marie Höbinger	4	0	4+0	0	0+0	0	0+0	0
15	MF	(Denmark) DEN	Sofie Lundgaard	7	0	0+3	0	1+0	0	0+3	0
16	DF	(Wales) WAL	Lily Woodham	17	0	10+2	0	1+1	0	3+0	0
17	DF	(Scotland) SCO	Jenna Clark	28	2	19+2	0	3+0	0	4+0	2
18	MF	(Wales) WAL	Ceri Holland	27	1	18+3	0	3+0	0	2+1	1
19	MF	(Scotland) SCO	Kirsty Maclean	23	0	10+6	0	2+1	0	4+0	0
22	GK	(England) ENG	Faye Kirby	11	0	8+0	0	0+0	0	3+0	0
23	DF	(England) ENG	Gemma Bonner	11	0	7+3	0	1+0	0	0+0	0
24	MF	(Scotland) SCO	Sam Kerr	10	1	8+0	0	0+0	0	2+0	1
25	DF	(Sweden) SWE	Alice Bergström	11	3	6+2	1	1+2	2	0+0	0
27	FW	(Switzerland) SUI	Aurélie Csillag	13	1	2+8	1	1+2	0	0+0	0
28	GK	(Sweden) SWE	Jennifer Falk	15	0	11+0	0	4+0	0	0+0	0
29	DF	(Spain) ESP	Alejandra Bernabé	19	0	9+4	0	4+0	0	0+2	0
31	FW	(Scotland) SCO	Martha Thomas	9	2	4+2	1	3+0	1	0+0	0
87	MF	(England) ENG	Maizie Trueman	1	0	0+0	0	1+0	0	0+0	0
Players away from the club on loan:
9	FW	(Republic of Ireland) IRL	Leanne Kiernan	7	0	1+4	0	0+0	0	1+1	0
12	GK	(Germany) GER	Rafaela Borggräfe	4	0	3+0	0	0+0	0	1+0	0
34	DF	(England) ENG	Hannah Silcock	4	0	1+2	0	0+0	0	0+1	0
Players who appeared for the club but left during the season:
6	MF	(Poland) POL	Emilia Szymczak	1	0	0+0	0	0+0	0	0+1	0

=== Goals ===
Rank	Pos.	No.	Player	Super League	FA Cup	League Cup	Total
1	FW	11	(Sweden) Beata Olsson	6	2	3	11
2	FW	13	(England) Mia Enderby	3	2	1	6
3	MF	18	(Wales) Ceri Holland	3	0	1	4
4	DF	25	(Sweden) Alice Bergström	1	2	0	3
5	FW	7	(Sweden) Cornelia Kapocs	2	0	0	2
5	FW	10	(Norway) Sophie Román Haug	0	0	2	2
5	DF	17	(Scotland) Jenna Clark	0	0	2	2
5	FW	31	(Scotland) Martha Thomas	1	1	0	2
5	MF	6	(Republic of Ireland) Denise O'Sullivan	0	2	0	2
5	MF	36	(England) Zara Shaw	1	1	0	2
6	DF	3	(Wales) Gemma Evans	0	0	1	1
6	DF	4	(England) Grace Fisk	1	0	0	1
6	DF	5	(Japan) Risa Shimizu	0	0	1	1
6	DF	23	(England) Gemma Bonner	0	1	0	1
6	MF	24	(Scotland) Sam Kerr	0	0	1	1
6	FW	27	(Switzerland) Aurélie Csillag	1	0	0	1
Own goals				2	0	0	2
Total				21	11	12	44

=== Clean sheets ===
Rank	No.	Player	Super League	FA Cup	League Cup	Total
1	28	(Sweden) Jennifer Falk	4	1	0	5
2	12	(Germany) Rafaela Borggräfe	0	0	1	1
Total			4	1	1	6

=== Disciplinary record ===
No.	Pos.	Player	Super League			FA Cup			League Cup			Total		
No.	Pos.	Player	Yellow card	(yellow card) (yellow-red card)	Red card	Yellow card	(yellow card) (yellow-red card)	Red card	Yellow card	(yellow card) (yellow-red card)	Red card	Yellow card	(yellow card) (yellow-red card)	Red card
2	DF	(England) Lucy Parry	2	0	0	0	0	0	0	0	0	2	0	0
3	DF	(Wales) Gemma Evans	1	0	0	0	0	0	0	0	0	1	0	0
4	DF	(England) Grace Fisk	1	0	0	0	0	0	0	0	0	1	0	0
5	DF	(Japan) Risa Shimizu	1	0	0	0	0	0	0	0	0	1	0	0
6	MF	(Republic of Ireland) Denise O'Sullivan	2	0	0	0	0	0	0	0	0	2	0	0
7	FW	(Sweden) Cornelia Kapocs	2	0	0	0	0	0	0	0	0	2	0	0
8	MF	(Japan) Fūka Nagano	2	0	0	0	0	0	0	0	0	2	0	0
10	FW	(Norway) Sophie Román Haug	1	0	0	0	0	0	0	0	0	1	0	0
11	FW	(Sweden) Beata Olsson	1	0	0	0	0	0	1	0	0	2	0	0
12	GK	(Germany) Rafaela Borggräfe	1	0	0	0	0	0	0	0	0	1	0	0
13	FW	(England) Mia Enderby	0	0	0	0	0	0	1	0	0	1	0	0
14	MF	(Austria) Marie Höbinger	1	0	0	0	0	0	0	0	0	1	0	0
16	DF	(Wales) Lily Woodham	1	0	0	0	0	0	0	0	0	1	0	0
17	DF	(Scotland) Jenna Clark	1	0	0	0	0	0	1	0	0	2	0	0
18	MF	(Wales) Ceri Holland	1	0	0	0	0	0	0	0	0	1	0	0
22	GK	(England) Faye Kirby	2	0	0	0	0	0	0	0	0	2	0	0
23	DF	(England) Gemma Bonner	0	0	1	0	0	0	0	0	0	0	0	1
25	DF	(Sweden) Alice Bergström	1	0	0	0	0	0	0	0	0	1	0	0
27	FW	(Switzerland) Aurélie Csillag	0	0	0	1	0	0	0	0	0	1	0	0
34	DF	(England) Hannah Silcock	1	0	0	0	0	0	0	0	0	1	0	0
Total			22	0	1	1	0	0	3	0	0	26	0	1
