= Hannah Silcock =

English footballer (born 2004)

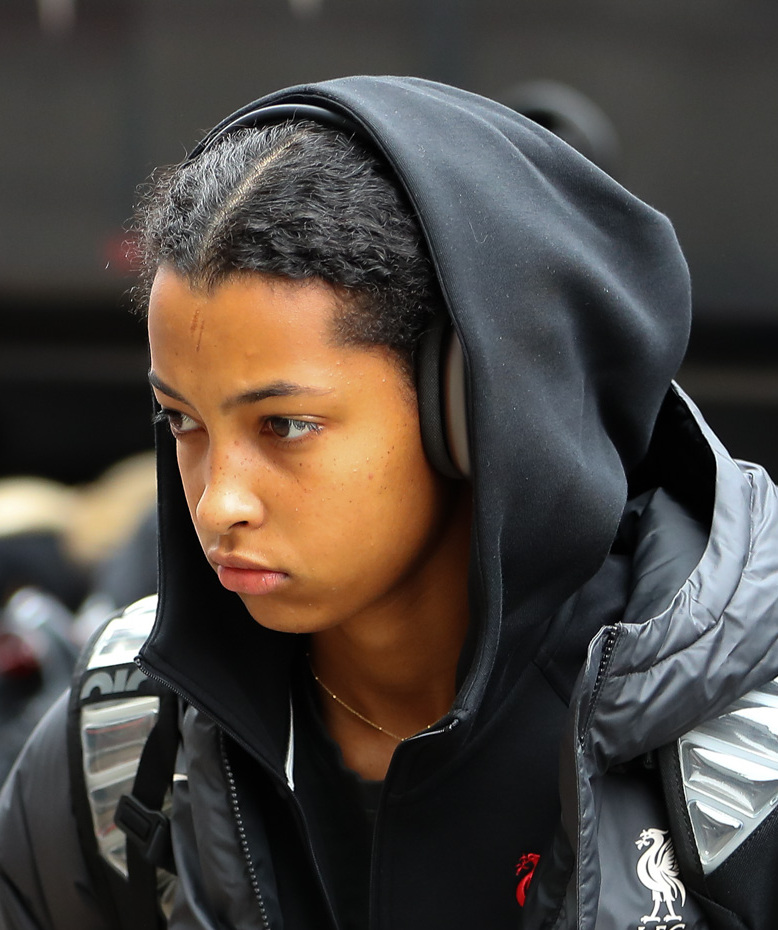
- Silcock in 2024

Personal information
- Full name: Hannah Mary Kagaza Silcock
- Date of birth: 18 September 2004 (age 22)
- Place of birth: Liverpool, England
- Position: Centre-back

Team information
- Current team: Everton
- Number: 25

Youth career
- Liverpool

Senior career*
Years	Team	Apps	(Gls)
2021–2026	Liverpool	11	(0)
2023–2024	→ Blackburn Rovers (loan)	21	(1)
2026	→ Birmingham City (loan)	2	(0)
2026–	Everton	2	(0)

International career^{‡}
2022–2023	England U19	6	(0)
2023–	England U23	7	(2)
- * Club domestic league appearances and goals as of 04:59, 15 September 2026 (UTC) ‡ National team caps and goals as of 17:03, 28 June 2026 (UTC)

Hannah Mary Kagaza Silcock (born 18 September 2004) is an English professional footballer who plays as a centre-back for Women's Super League club Everton and the England under-23 team.

Silcock previously played Liverpool, and played on loan for Blackburn Rovers and Birmingham City, and represented England at under-19 level.

== Early life ==
Silcock was born in Liverpool on 18 September 2004. She grew up as a fan of Liverpool F.C.

She joined Liverpool's academy aged 8 and played for the team's Regional Talent Club at the U-16 age group.

In 2023, Silcock completed A-Level qualifications in biology, chemistry, and maths, receiving an A and two B grades.

== Club career ==
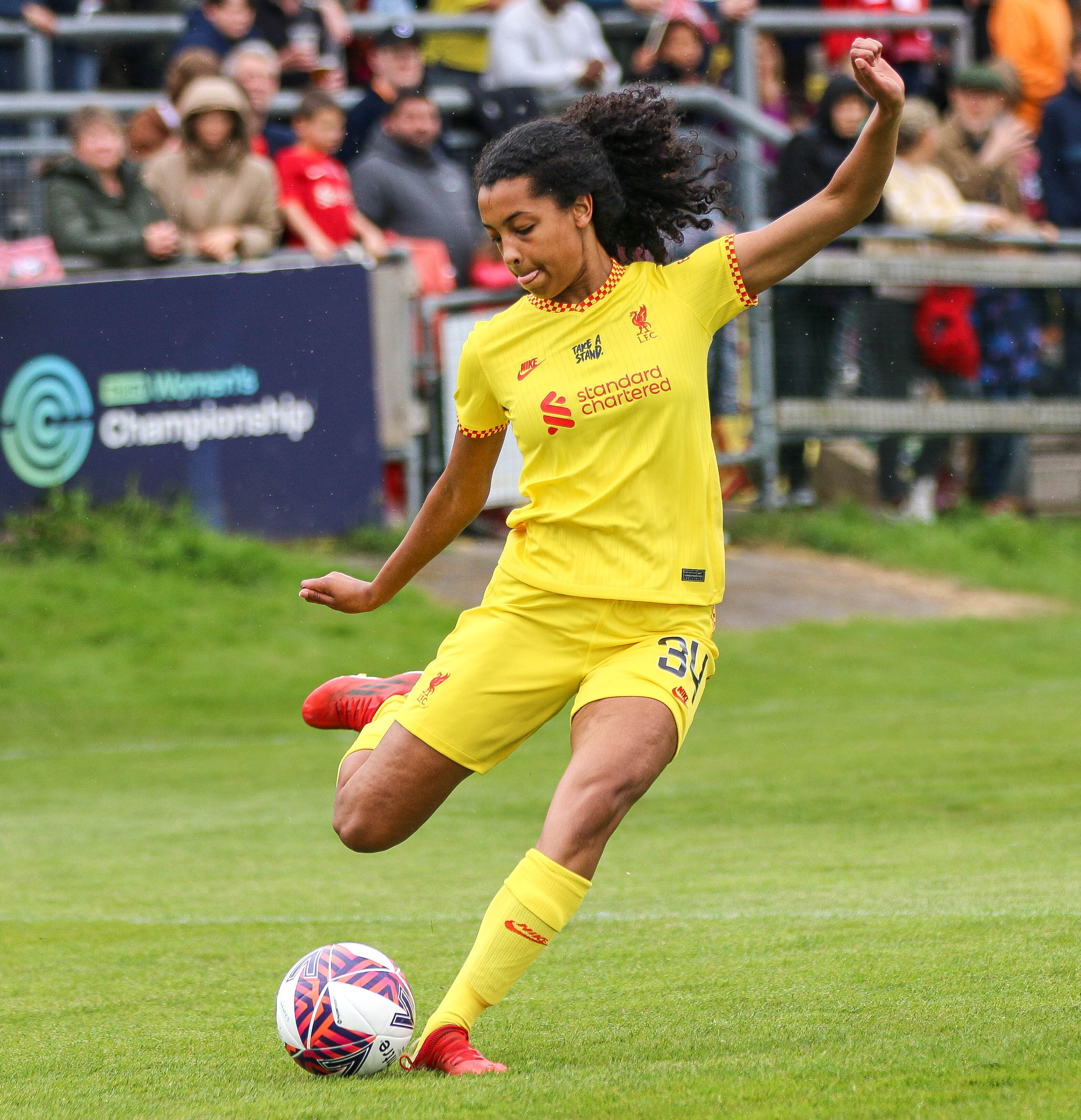
Silcock playing for Liverpool against Lewes, May 2022

=== Liverpool, 2021–26 ===
Silcock made her senior debut for Liverpool during the team's 2021–22 Championship-winning season. She featured 5 times across all competitions.

On October 6, 2022, Silcock, aged 18, signed her first professional contract with Liverpool. On 7 December 2022, she featured in the starting lineup for the 2022–23 League Cup match against Manchester United, and was praised by manager Matt Beard, despite the team's 2–0 loss.

In March 2023, Silcock was featured in Goal.com's "NXGN Nine" as one of the best English players aged 19 or younger. She was described as a "classy centre-back who is good on the ball".

==== Loan to Blackburn Rovers, 2023–24 ====
On 25 August 2023, Silcock joined Women's Championship side Blackburn Rovers on loan for the 2023–24 season.

==== Return to Liverpool, 2024–25 ====
On 5 August 2025, it was announced that Silcock had signed a new contract to extend her time with Liverpool.

==== Loan to Birmingham City, 2025–26 ====
On 23 January 2026, Liverpool announced that Silcock had joined WSL 2 side Birmingham City on loan for the remainder of the 2025–26 season. With Birmingham City, she won the WSL 2 title, helping to secure the team's promotion back to the WSL.

In May 2026, Birmingham City confirmed that Silcock would return to parent club Liverpool at the end of the season.

=== Everton, 2026– ===
On 13 August 2026, Silcock joined Everton for an undisclosed fee.

== International career ==
=== Under-19 ===
In October 2022, Silcock received her first call-up to the England under-19 squad for 2023 U19 European Championship qualification. She made her youth international debut in the starting eleven against Slovakia on October 5, followed by appearing as a substitute against Slovenia.

In April 2023, Silcock featured in England's second round qualification matches for the U-19 Euros that summer, with England missing out on qualifying for the final tournament after being defeated 1–0 by Spain.

=== Under-23 ===
In November 2023, Silcock was included in the under-23 squad for the first time.

On 26 February 2024, she scored her first youth international goal against the Netherlands; it was also her first time appearing in the under-23's starting lineup.

On 17 April 2026, she scored England's second goal in a 3–0 win over Sweden to win the 2025-26 U23 European Competition title.

== Career statistics ==
=== Club ===
As of match played 13 September 2026

Appearances and goals by club, season and competition
Club	Season	League			National cup (Note: Includes Women's FA Cup)		League cup (Note: Includes Women's League Cup)		Total	
Club	Season	Division	Apps	Goals	Apps	Goals	Apps	Goals	Apps	Goals
Liverpool	2021–22	Women's Championship	2	0	1	0	2	0	5	0
Liverpool	2022–23	Women's Super League	1	0	0	0	4	0	5	0
Liverpool	2024–25	Women's Super League	5	0	0	0	3	0	8	0
Liverpool	2025–26	Women's Super League	3	0	0	0	1	0	4	0
Liverpool	Total		11	0	1	0	10	0	22	0
Blackburn Rovers (loan)	2023–24	Women's Championship	21	1	1	0	3	0	25	1
Birmingham City (loan)	2025–26	Women's Super League 2	2	0	2	0	0	0	4	0
Everton	2026–27	Women's Super League	2	0	0	0	0	0	2	0
Career total			36	1	4	0	13	0	53	1

== Honours ==
Liverpool

- Women's Championship: 2021–22

Birmingham City

- Women's Super League 2: 2025–26
