= Anna Jøsendal =

Norwegian football player (born 2001)

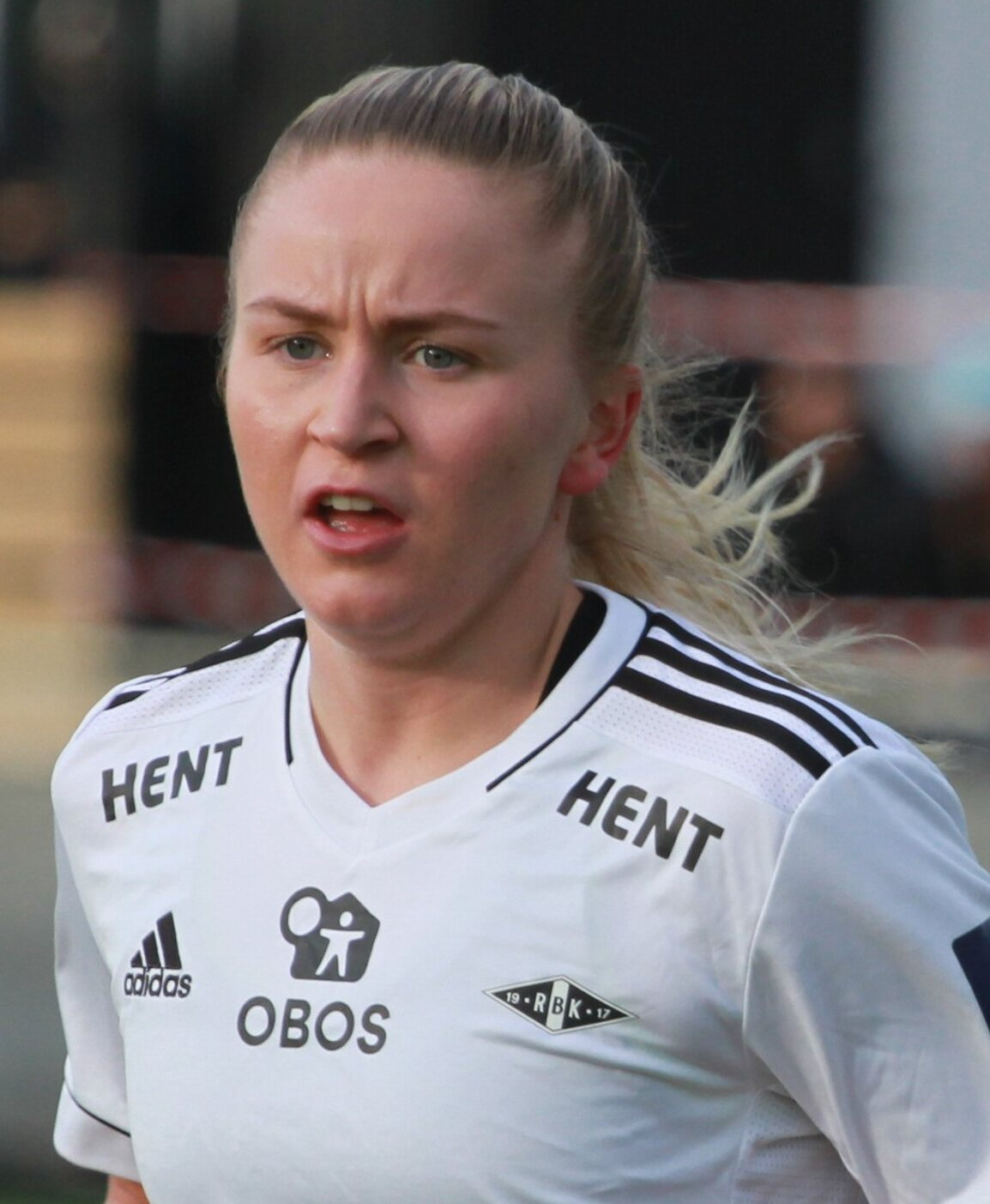
- Jøsendal with Rosenborg in 2022

Personal information
- Full name: Anna Langås Jøsendal
- Date of birth: 29 April 2001 (age 25)
- Place of birth: Norway
- Height: 1.70 m (5 ft 7 in)
- Position: Forward

Team information
- Current team: Liverpool
- Number: 21

Youth career
- Odda

Senior career*
Years	Team	Apps	(Gls)
2017	Avaldsnes 2	9	(5)
2017–2021	Avaldsnes	59	(12)
2022–2023	Rosenborg	47	(14)
2024–2026	Hammarby IF	34	(8)
2026–	Liverpool	4	(0)

International career^{‡}
2016	Norway U15	3	(0)
2017	Norway U16	11	(4)
2018	Norway U17	7	(0)
2018–2020	Norway U19	15	(2)
2019–	Norway U23	13	(4)
2022–	Norway	10	(0)
- * Club domestic league appearances and goals as of 16:58, 16 May 2026 (UTC) ‡ National team caps and goals as of 5 June 2026

Anna Langås Jøsendal (born 29 April 2001) is a Norwegian professional footballer who plays as a forward for Women's Super League club Liverpool and the Norway national team.

== Club career ==
=== Avaldsnes ===
After playing age-specific football in Odda Fotballklubb, Jøsendal signed for Avaldsnes in July 2017. She was one of four sixteen year-olds in Avaldsnes' squad for the 2017 Norwegian Women's Cup final. In October 2018, she signed her first professional contract with the club. In both 2019 and 2020 she was plagued with several injury interruptions, which prevented her from getting the continuity she wanted. In the summer of 2020, she renewed her contract with Avaldsnes until the 2021 season.

=== Rosenborg ===
In August 2021, it was known that Jøsendal had signed for Rosenborg from 1 January 2022. In 2023 Jøsendal was named Toppserien player of the year after scoring 8 goals in 24 matches for her team that year, as well as having been part of the side which won the 2023 Norwegian Women's Cup. Her contract with Rosenborg expired at the end of 2023.

=== Hammarby ===
Hammarby announced the signing of Jøsendal at the end of December 2023. She signed a two-and-a-half year contract.

=== Liverpool ===
Liverpool announced the signing of Jøsendal on 9 January 2026.

== International career ==
Jøsendal is a former Norwegian youth international for U15, U16, U17, U19, and U23. She played for the U19 team during the U19 European Championship in Scotland 2019. In August 2021, she was selected for the Norway senior national football team for the first time. In June 2022, she was included in Norway's squad for UEFA Euro 2022. She made her senior team debut on 25 June 2022 in a 2–0 friendly win against New Zealand at Ullevaal Stadion ahead of the European Championship.

On 19 June 2023, she was included in the 23-player Norwegian squad for the FIFA Women's World Cup 2023.

== Career statistics ==
=== Club ===
As of match played 16 May 2026

Appearances and goals by club, season and competition
Club	Season	League			National cup (Note: Includes Norwegian Women's Cup, Svenska Cupen, Women's FA Cup)		League cup (Note: Includes Women's League Cup)		Continental		Total	
Club	Season	Division	Apps	Goals	Apps	Goals	Apps	Goals	Apps	Goals	Apps	Goals
Avaldsnes 2	2017	2 div. Kvinner avd. 04	9	5	—		—		—		9	5
Avaldsnes	2017	Toppserien	3	1	2	0	—		3 (Note: Appearance(s) in UEFA Women's Champions League)	0	8	1
Avaldsnes	2018	Toppserien	21	1	2	2	—		5	0	28	3
Avaldsnes	2019	Toppserien	12	4	1	0	—		—		13	4
Avaldsnes	2020	Toppserien	13	1	1	0	—		—		14	1
Avaldsnes	2021	Toppserien	10	5	3	3	—		—		13	8
Avaldsnes	Total		59	12	9	5	0	0	8	0	76	17
Rosenborg	2022	Toppserien	23	6	3	0	—		4	0	30	6
Rosenborg	2023	Toppserien	24	8	5	0	—		—		29	8
Rosenborg	Total		47	14	8	0	0	0	4	0	59	14
Hammarby	2024	Damallsvenskan	12	3	4	2	—		4	0	20	5
Hammarby	2025	Damallsvenskan	22	5	4	1	—		6 (Note: Two appearance in UEFA Women's Champions League; four appearances, one goal in UEFA Women's Europa Cup)	1	32	7
Hammarby			34	8	9	3	0	0	10	1	52	12
Liverpool	2025–26	Women's Super League	4	0	0	0	0	0	—		4	0
Career total			153	39	26	8	0	0	22	1	200	48

=== International ===
As of match played 1 December 2025

Appearances and goals by national team and year
National team	Year	Apps	Goals
Norway	2022	6	0
Norway	2023	3	0
Norway	2025	1	0
Total		10	0

== Honours ==
=== Club ===
Rosenborg

- Norwegian Cup: 2023
