= Rafaela Borggräfe =

German footballer (born 2000)

Personal information
- Date of birth: 5 March 2000 (age 26)
- Place of birth: Emmendingen, Germany
- Height: 1.72 m (5 ft 8 in)
- Position: Goalkeeper

Team information
- Current team: Bayer Leverkusen (on loan from Liverpool)
- Number: 12

Youth career
- 2005–2012: SC Holzhausen
- 2012–2013: SC March
- 2014–2017: SC Freiburg

Senior career*
Years	Team	Apps	(Gls)
2016–2023	SC Freiburg II	35	(0)
2017–2025	SC Freiburg	59	(0)
2020–2021	→ FC Aarau (loan)	15	(0)
2025–	Liverpool	3	(0)
2026–	→ Bayer Leverkusen (loan)	21	(0)

International career^{‡}
2016	Germany U16	1	(0)
2016–2017	Germany U17	2	(0)
2018–2019	Germany U19	5	(0)
2024–	Germany U23	5	(0)
- * Club domestic league appearances and goals as of 20 November 2026 ‡ National team caps and goals as of 9 June 2026

Rafaela Borggräfe (German: [ʁa.faˈeː.la ˈbɔʁk.ɡʁɛː.fə]; born 5 March 2000) is a German professional footballer who plays as a goalkeeper for Frauen Bundesliga side Bayer Leverkusen, on loan from Women's Super League club Liverpool.

== Career ==
=== SC Freiburg, 2017–2025 ===
Borggräfe played for SC Holzhausen and SC March during her youth, before moving to SC Freiburg's youth ranks in 2014.

Three years later she moved to the team's second senior squad on a full-time basis, having made her Regionalliga Süd debut against Wetzlar II.

==== Loan to FC Aarau, 2020–21 ====
For the 2020–21 season, Borggräfe was loaned out to FC Aarau in Switzerland. The team would win the league and was promoted to the Swiss Super League, with Borggräfe acting as the team's starting goalkeeper, recording six clean sheets.

==== Return to Freiburg, 2021–25 ====
After returning to Freiburg, Borggräfe became the team's starting goalie in the Bundesliga. She continued her role throughout the following season, until an illness led her to miss nearly the entirety of the 2023 calendar year. Borggräfe returned to action in December 2023; her 2023–24 Bundesliga campaign included 14 matches and five clean sheets.

Freiburg's 2024–25 season began well, as Borggräfe kept four clean sheets in the season's first half. In July 2025, Borggräfe departed Freiburg.

=== Liverpool, 2025– ===
On July 18, 2025, Borggräfe completed a move to Women's Super League side Liverpool.

In January 2026, following investigation by the Football Association that began in September 2025, Borggräfe received a six-game ban after being found to have used discriminatory language that involved reference to skin colour during Liverpool's pre-season training camp.

==== Loan to Bayer Leverkusen, 2025– ====
In February 2026, it was announced that Borggräfe would join Frauen Bundesliga side Bayer Leverkusen on loan for the duration of the 2025–26 season. In July 2026, Liverpool announced that she would remain on loan with Bayer Leverkusen for the 2026–27 season.

== Career statistics ==
=== Club ===
As of match played 20 November 2026

Appearances and goals by club, season and competition
Club	Season	League			National cup (Note: Includes DFB-Pokal, Schweizer Cup, Women's FA Cup)		League cup (Note: Includes Women's League Cup)		Total	
Club	Season	Division	Apps	Goals	Apps	Goals	Apps	Goals	Apps	Goals
SC Freiburg II	2016–17	Regionalliga Süd	1	0	—		—		1	0
SC Freiburg II	2017–18	Regionalliga Süd	5	0	—		—		5	0
SC Freiburg II	2018–19	Regionalliga Süd	16	0	—		—		16	0
SC Freiburg II	2019–20	Regionalliga Süd	9	0	—		—		9	0
SC Freiburg II	2021–22	Regionalliga Süd	1	0	—		—		1	0
SC Freiburg II	2023–24	Regionalliga Süd	3	0	—		—		3	0
SC Freiburg II	Total		35	0	—		—		35	0
SC Freiburg	2021–22	Frauen-Bundesliga	16	0	2	0	—		18	0
SC Freiburg	2022–23	Frauen-Bundesliga	10	0	2	0	—		12	0
SC Freiburg	2023–24	Frauen-Bundesliga	14	0	1	0	—		15	0
SC Freiburg	2024–25	Frauen-Bundesliga	19	0	2	0	—		21	0
SC Freiburg	Total		59	0	7	0	—		66	0
FC Aarau	2020–21	Nationalliga B	15	0	2	0	—		17	0
Liverpool	2025–26	Women's Super League	3	0	0	0	1	0	4	0
Bayer Leverkusen (loan)	2025–26	Frauen-Bundesliga	10	0	0	0	0	0	10	0
Bayer Leverkusen (loan)	2026–27	Frauen-Bundesliga	11	0	1	0	0	0	12	0
Bayer Leverkusen (loan)	Total		21	0	1	0	—		22	0
Career total			133	0	10	0	1	0	142	0
