= 2026–27 Everton F.C. (women) season =

Everton
2026–27 season
- Head coach: Scott Phelan
- Stadium: Goodison Park, Liverpool
Home colours	Away colours	Third colours

The 2026–27 Everton F.C. (women) season is the club's tenth consecutive campaign in the Women's Super League, the highest level of the football pyramid. Along with competing in the WSL, the club will also contest two domestic cup competitions: the FA Cup and the League Cup.

This will be the club's second season at Goodison Park, moving from Walton Hall Park after the men's team moved from Goodison Park to Hill Dickinson Stadium.

== Season summary ==
In May 2025, Hannah Forshaw was appointed as CEO of Everton Women, before stepping down at the end of the 2025–26 season.

Everton women finished 8th in the league during the 2025–26 season.

On 23 June 2026, they hired Scott Phelan as permanent manager of the club.

On 9 July 2026, Aurora Galli signed a one year contract extension with the club.

On 13 July 2026, Megan Finnigan signed a one year contract extension with the club.

On 17 July 2026, Kelly Gago left Everton to join West Ham United for an undisclosed club record fee.

On 23 July 2026, Karen Holmgaard signed a one year contract extension with the club.

On 26 July 2026, Martina Fernandez departed the club to re-join Barcelona after the Spanish side triggered the buy-back clause in her contract.

On 27 July 2026, Naomi Layzell joined the club on a season-long loan from Manchester City.

On 11 August 2026, Inês Pereira departed the club to join Deportivo de A Coruña.

On 12 August 2026, Rylee Foster-Inman joined the club from Halifax Tides.

On 13 August 2026, Hannah Silcock joined the club from Liverpool.

On 6 September 2026, it was announced that the Women's Super League had opened an investigation into a breach of rules that happened during Everton's season opener against Crystal Palace. Crystal Palace used four substitution windows; league regulations state a maximum of three windows are allowed. Palace beat Everton 1–0, and secured three league points. Megan Wilson, the referee for the game, and her officiating team, will be stood down for the next round of WSL and WSL 2 fixtures.

On 28 October 2026, Everton defeated Sheffield United 2–1 in the WSL Players Cup. The match saw academy graduates Amy Pracy and Divine Obida make their senior first-team debuts. Pracy entered as a 77th-minute substitute for Noémie Mouchon, wearing the number 50 shirt.

== Squad ==
As of 13 August 2026

No.	Nat	Name	Date of birth (age)	Signed from	Since
Goalkeepers
1	(Republic of Ireland)	Courtney Brosnan	10 November 1995 (age 31)	(England) West Ham United	2021
24	(Canada)	Rylee Foster-Inman	13 August 1998 (age 28)	(Canada) Halifax Tides	2026
41	(Wales)	Orla Howard	16 January 2008 (age 18)	(England) West Bromwich Albion	2026
Defenders
2	(England)	Hannah Blundell	25 May 1994 (age 32)	(England) Manchester United	2026
3	(Japan)	Rion Ishikawa	4 July 2003 (age 23)	(Japan) Urawa Red Diamonds Ladies	2025
4	(England)	Issy Hobson	31 October 2007 (age 19)	Academy	2023
5	(England)	Naomi Layzell	29 February 2004 (age 22)	(England) Manchester City (on loan)	2026
13	(Japan)	Hikaru Kitagawa	10 May 1997 (age 29)	(Sweden) BK Häcken FF	2025
20	(England)	Megan Finnigan	2 April 1998 (age 28)	Academy	2015
25	(England)	Hannah Silcock	18 September 2004 (age 22)	(England) Liverpool	2026
33	(Philippines)	Maz Pacheco	25 August 1998 (age 28)	(England) Aston Villa	2025
Midfielders
6	(Japan)	Honoka Hayashi	19 May 1998 (age 28)	(England) West Ham United	2024
7	(Australia)	Clare Wheeler	14 January 1998 (age 28)	(Denmark) Fortuna Hjørring	2022
8	(Netherlands)	Rosa van Gool	9 February 2004 (age 22)	(Netherlands) Ajax	2025
21	(Slovenia)	Zara Kramžar	10 January 2006 (age 20)	(Italy) Roma	2026
22	(Italy)	Aurora Galli	13 December 1996 (age 29)	(Italy) Juventus	2021
28	(Denmark)	Karen Holmgaard	28 January 1999 (age 27)	(Germany) Turbine Potsdam	2022
30	(England)	Ruby Mace	5 September 2003 (age 23)	(England) Leicester City	2025
34	(England)	Ellie Jones	15 November 2007 (age 19)	Academy	2026
Forwards
9	(Australia)	Holly McNamara	23 January 2003 (age 23)	Free agent	2026
10	(Spain)	Inma Gabarro	5 November 2002 (age 24)	(Spain) Sevilla	2024
11	(Wales)	Hannah Cain	11 February 1999 (age 27)	Free agent	2026
15	(Finland)	Jutta Rantala	10 November 1999 (age 27)	(England) Leicester City	2026
17	(France)	Noémie Mouchon	6 June 2003 (age 23)	Free agent	2026
18	(Spain)	Ornella Vignola	30 September 2004 (age 22)	(Spain) Granada	2025
29	(Japan)	Yūka Momiki	9 April 1996 (age 30)	Free agent	2025

=== Contract renewals ===
No.	Pos.	Nat.	Name	Date	Until	Ref.
22	MF	(Italy)	Aurora Galli	9 July 2026	30 June 2027	
20	DF	(England)	Megan Finnigan	13 July 2026	30 June 2027	
28	MF	(Denmark)	Karen Holmgaard	23 July 2026	30 June 2027	

== Pre–season ==
1 August 2026 Friendly	Hamburger SV	0–1	Everton	Hamburg, Germany
1:30pm CEST		Report	Vignola 52'	Stadium: Volksparkstadion

7 August 2026 Friendly	Burnley	0–0	Everton
		Report		Attendance: Behind closed doors

8 August 2026 Friendly	Newcastle United	0–1	Everton	Gateshead International Stadium
		Report	van Gool 60'	Attendance: Behind closed doors

19 August 2026 Friendly	Leicester City	2–4	Everton	Belvoir Drive, Leicester
	Tierney 10'; Draper	Report	Pacheco 25'; van Gool; Momiki; Vignola	Attendance: Behind-closed-doors

== Women's Super League ==
=== League table ===
Pos	Team	Pld	W	D	L	GF	GA	GD	Pts
8	Aston Villa	11	3	5	3	12	17	−5	14
9	Liverpool	11	3	3	5	17	16	+1	12
10	Everton	11	3	3	5	8	11	−3	12
11	West Ham United	10	4	0	6	11	19	−8	12
12	Crystal Palace	11	2	3	6	12	27	−15	9

Updated to match(es) played on 22 November 2026. Source: Women's Super League Table
Rules for classification: 1) Points; 2) Goal difference; 3) Number of goals scored.

=== Matches ===
The league schedule was released on 30 July 2026.

6 September 2026 1	Crystal Palace	1–0	Everton	Sutton
14:00 BST	Lloyd-Smith 34'; Goldie (yellow card) 44'; Bartrip (yellow card) 51'; Hopcroft (yellow card) 74'	Report	Kramžar (yellow card) 51'; Mace (yellow card) 68'	Stadium: Gander Green Lane; Attendance: 1,274; Referee: Megan Wilson

13 September 2026 2	Everton	1–0	Charlton Athletic	Liverpool
14:00 BST	Robe 77' (o.g.)	Report	Neville (red card) 58'; Cissoko (yellow card) 90+1' (red card) 90+3'	Stadium: Goodison Park; Referee: Alice Parker

20 September 2026 3	West Ham United	0–1	Everton	Dagenham
14:00 BST	Cascarino (yellow card) 40'; Asseyi (yellow card) 90'	Report	van Gool (yellow card) 34'; Codina , 90+4' (o.g.)	Stadium: Chigwell Construction Stadium; Referee: Phoebe Cross

27 September 2026 4	Liverpool	2–0	Everton	Liverpool
14:00 BST	Olsson 4'; Kapocs 86'	Report	Mace (yellow card) 54'	Stadium: Anfield; Referee: Kirsty Dowle

4 October 2026 5	Everton	2–1	Birmingham City	Liverpool
14:00 BST	Mace 12', 72'; McNamara (yellow card) 90+4'	Report	Hurtré 15'	Stadium: Goodison Park; Attendance: 2,026; Referee: William Davis

18 October 2026 6	London City Lionesses	2–1	Everton	Bromley
14:00 BST	Cascarino 24'; Godfrey 35'; Anyomi (yellow card) 79'	Report	Cain 71'	Stadium: Hayes Lane; Attendance: 4,044; Referee: Sophie Dennington

25 October 2026 7	Everton	2–3	Aston Villa	Liverpool
14:00 GMT	McNamara 79'; Mouchon 90'	Report	Maritz 4'; Vangsgaard 32', 50'	Stadium: Goodison Park; Referee: Abigail Byrne

31 October 2026 8	Everton	0–0	Manchester United	Liverpool
12:45 GMT	van Gool (yellow card) 25'	Report	Awujo (yellow card) 69'; Medina (yellow card) 90+2'	Stadium: Goodison Park; Referee: Adewunmi Soneye

7 November 2026 9	Chelsea	1–1	Everton	Fulham
12:30 GMT	Baltimore 28'		Bronze 33' (o.g.); Blundell (yellow card) 88'; Mace (yellow card) 90'	Stadium: Stamford Bridge; Referee: Lisa Benn

14 November 2026 10	Tottenham Hotspur	0–0	Everton	Leyton
15:00 GMT	Blakstad (yellow card) 33'; Spence (yellow card) 71'		Mace (yellow card) 53'	Stadium: Brisbane Road; Attendance: 1,256; Referee: Emily Heaslip

22 November 2026 11	Everton	0–1	Brighton & Hove Albion	Liverpool
14:00 GMT	Galli (yellow card) 84'	Report	Pacheco 6' (o.g.); García (yellow card) 58'	Stadium: Goodison Park; Referee: William Davis

12 December 2026 12	Everton	v	Arsenal	Liverpool
12:30 GMT				Stadium: Goodison Park

20 December 2026 13	Manchester City	v	Everton	Manchester
14:00 GMT				Stadium: Academy Stadium

10 January 2027 14	Aston Villa	v	Everton	Birmingham
14:00 GMT				Stadium: Villa Park

20 January 2027 15	Everton	v	London City Lionesses	Liverpool
19:00 GMT				Stadium: Goodison Park

24 January 2027 16	Manchester United	v	Everton	Leigh
13:00 GMT				Stadium: Leigh Sports Village

31 January 2027 17	Everton	v	West Ham	Liverpool
14:00 GMT				Stadium: Goodison Park

7 February 2027 18	Brighton & Hove Albion	v	Everton	Crawley
14:00 GMT				Stadium: Broadfield Stadium

14 February 2027 19	Everton	v	Tottenham Hotspur	Liverpool
14:00 GMT				Stadium: Goodison Park

14 March 2027 20	Everton	v	Crystal Palace	Liverpool
14:00 GMT				Stadium: Goodison Park

17 March 2027 21	Charlton Athletic	v	Everton	Charlton
19:00 GMT				Stadium: The Valley

28 March 2027 22	Everton	v	Liverpool	Liverpool
14:00 BST				Stadium: Goodison Park

4 April 2027 23	Arsenal	v	Everton	Holloway
14:00 BST				Stadium: Emirates Stadium

30 April 2027 24	Everton	v	Manchester City	Liverpool
19:00 BST				Stadium: Goodison Park

9 May 2027 25	Birmingham City	v	Everton	Birmingham
14:00 BST				Stadium: St Andrew's

22 May 2027 26	Everton	v	Chelsea	Liverpool
14:00 TBC BST				Stadium: Goodison Park

== WSL Players Cup ==
Pos	Grp	Team	Pld	W	PW	PL	L	GF	GA	GD	Pts	Qualification
1	NR	Manchester United	5	5	0	0	0	25	6	+19	15	Advance to Knockout Phase
2	SR	Brighton & Hove Albion	5	4	0	0	1	14	2	+12	12	Advance to Knockout Phase
3	NR	Everton	5	4	0	0	1	13	3	+10	12	Advance to Knockout Phase
4	NR	Liverpool	5	4	0	0	1	19	12	+7	12	Advance to Knockout Phase
5	SR	London City Lionesses	5	4	0	0	1	9	4	+5	12	Advance to Knockout Phase

Updated to match(es) played on 18 November 2026. Source: WSL Football
Rules for classification: 1) Points; 2) Goal difference; 3) Number of goals scored; 4) Number of wins; 5) Head-to-head record

23 September 2026 1	Everton	2–0	Birmingham City	Walton
19:00	Kramžar 17'; Ishikawa (yellow card) 32'; Momiki 55'	Report	Rastocle (yellow card) 71'	Stadium: Goodison Park; Attendance: 1,096; Referee: Adewunmi Soneye

21 October 2026 2	Everton	2–0	Newcastle United	Walton
19:00	Vignola (yellow card) 66', (goal) 81', 84'	Report	Kiernan (yellow card) 48'; Cataldo (yellow card) 65'	Stadium: Goodison Park; Referee: Grace Lowe

28 October 2026 3	Sheffield United	1–2	Everton	Scunthorpe
19:00 GMT	Willis 90+1'	Report	van Gool 8'; Mouchon 14'	Stadium: Attis Arena; Attendance: 502; Referee: Aimee Keir

11 November 2026 4	Everton	6–0	Durham	Walton
19:00 GMT	Rantala 20'; Momiki 51', 71', 88'; Mouchon 64', 85'	Report		Stadium: Goodison Park; Attendance: 1,005; Referee: Megan Wilson

18 November 2026 5	Manchester United	v	Everton	Leigh
19:00		Report		Stadium: Progress With Unity Stadium

16 December 2026 6	Sunderland	v	Everton	Hetton-le-Hole
19:00		Report		Stadium: Eppleton CW

== Transfers ==
=== Transfers in ===
Date	Position	Nationality	Name	From	Ref.
14 July 2026	FW	(Slovenia)	Zara Kramžar	(Italy) Roma	
14 July 2026	FW	(France)	Noémie Mouchon	(England) Leicester City	
15 July 2026	GK	(Wales)	Orla Howard	(England) West Bromwich Albion	
16 July 2026	FW	(Wales)	Hannah Cain	(England) Leicester City	
20 July 2026	DF	(England)	Hannah Blundell	(England) Manchester United	
21 July 2026	FW	(Australia)	Holly McNamara	(Australia) Melbourne City	
22 July 2026	FW	(Finland)	Jutta Rantala	(England) Leicester City	
12 August 2026	GK	(Canada)	Rylee Foster-Inman	(Canada) Halifax Tides	
13 August 2026	DF	(England)	Hannah Silcock	(England) Liverpool	

=== Loans in ===
Date	Position	Nationality	Name	From	Until	Ref.
27 July 2026	DF	(England)	Naomi Layzell	(England) Manchester City	End of season	

=== Transfers out ===
Date	Position	Nationality	Name	To	Ref.
5 June 2026	DF	(Scotland)	Lucy Hope	Retired	
26 June 2026	FW	(Netherlands)	Katja Snoeijs	(Netherlands) Ajax	
26 June 2026	GK	(England)	Emily Ramsey	(England) Aston Villa	
26 June 2026	FW	(Nigeria)	Toni Payne	(Italy) Inter Milan	
26 June 2026	DF	(Scotland)	Kenzie Weir	(England) Ipswich Town	
26 June 2026	MF	(England)	Melissa Lawley	(England) Wolverhampton Wanderers	
26 June 2026	DF	(Norway)	Elise Stenevik	(Germany) 1. FC Köln	
17 July 2026	FW	(France)	Kelly Gago	(England) West Ham	
26 July 2026	DF	(Spain)	Martina Fernández	(Spain) Barcelona	
11 August 2026	GK	(Portugal)	Inês Pereira	(Spain) Deportivo de A Coruña	

=== Loans out ===
Date	Position	Nationality	Name	To	Until	Ref.
4 September 2026	MF	(England)	Ellie Jones	(England) Liverpool Feds	End of season	

== Squad statistics ==
As of match played 27 September 2026

=== Appearances ===
No.	Pos	Nat	Player	Total		Women's Super League		FA Cup		Players Cup	
No.	Pos	Nat	Player	Apps	Goals	Apps	Goals	Apps	Goals	Apps	Goals
1	GK	(Republic of Ireland) IRL	Courtney Brosnan	4	0	4	0	0	0	0	0
2	DF	(England) ENG	Hannah Blundell	5	0	4	0	0	0	0+1	0
3	DF	(Japan) JPN	Rion Ishikawa	4	0	1+2	0	0	0	1	0
4	DF	(England) ENG	Issy Hobson	1	0	0	0	0	0	1	0
5	DF	(England) ENG	Naomi Layzell	3	0	3	0	0	0	0	0
6	MF	(Japan) JPN	Honoka Hayashi	3	0	1+1	0	0	0	1	0
7	MF	(Australia) AUS	Clare Wheeler	3	0	3	0	0	0	0	0
8	MF	(Netherlands) NED	Rosa van Gool	5	0	2+2	0	0	0	1	0
9	FW	(Australia) AUS	Holly McNamara	4	0	3+1	0	0	0	0	0
10	FW	(Spain) ESP	Inma Gabarro	0	0	0	0	0	0	0	0
11	FW	(Wales) WAL	Hannah Cain	5	0	3+1	0	0	0	0+1	0
13	DF	(Japan) JPN	Hikaru Kitagawa	5	0	4	0	0	0	0+1	0
15	MF	(Finland) FIN	Jutta Rantala	0	0	0	0	0	0	0	0
17	FW	(France) FRA	Noémie Mouchon	1	0	0+1	0	0	0	0	0
18	FW	(Spain) ESP	Ornella Vignola	5	0	4	0	0	0	1	0
20	DF	(England) ENG	Megan Finnigan	2	0	0+1	0	0	0	1	0
21	MF	(Slovenia) SLO	Zara Kramžar	5	1	3+1	0	0	0	1	1
22	MF	(Italy) ITA	Aurora Galli	1	0	0	0	0	0	1	0
24	GK	(Canada) CAN	Rylee Foster-Inman	1	0	0	0	0	0	1	0
25	DF	(England) ENG	Hannah Silcock	4	0	3+1	0	0	0	0	0
28	DF	(Denmark) DEN	Karen Holmgaard	0	0	0	0	0	0	0	0
29	FW	(Japan) JPN	Yūka Momiki	5	1	1+3	0	0	0	1	1
30	MF	(England) ENG	Ruby Mace	4	0	4	0	0	0	0	0
33	DF	(Philippines) PHI	Maz Pacheco	5	0	1+3	0	0	0	1	0
34	DF	(England) ENG	Ellie Jones	0	0	0	0	0	0	0	0

=== Goals ===
Rank	Pos.	No.	Player	Women's Super League	FA Cup	WSL Players Cup	Total
1	MF	21	(Slovenia) Zara Kramžar	0	0	1	1
1	FW	29	(Japan) Yūka Momiki	0	0	1	1
Own goals				2	0	0	2
Total				2	0	2	4

=== Assists ===
Rank	Pos.	No.	Player	Women's Super League	FA Cup	WSL Players Cup	Total
1	MF	8	(Netherlands) Rosa van Gool	0	0	1	1
1	FW	29	(Japan) Yūka Momiki	0	0	1	1
Total				0	0	2	2

=== Clean sheets ===
Rank	No.	Player	Women's Super League	FA Cup	WSL Players Cup	Total
1	1	(Republic of Ireland) Courtney Brosnan	2	0	0	2
2	24	(Canada) Rylee Foster-Inman	0	0	1	1
Total			2	0	1	3

=== Disciplinary record ===
No.	Pos.	Player	Super League			FA Cup			League Cup			Total		
No.	Pos.	Player	Yellow card	(yellow card) (yellow-red card)	Red card	Yellow card	(yellow card) (yellow-red card)	Red card	Yellow card	(yellow card) (yellow-red card)	Red card	Yellow card	(yellow card) (yellow-red card)	Red card
8	MF	(Australia) Rosa van Gool	1	0	0	0	0	0	0	0	0	1	0	0
21	MF	(Slovenia) Zara Kramžar	1	0	0	0	0	0	0	0	0	1	0	0
30	MF	(England) Ruby Mace	2	0	0	0	0	0	0	0	0	2	0	0
Total			4	0	0	0	0	0	0	0	0	4	0	0
