= 2024 SheBelieves Cup squads =

List of players competing at the 9th edition of the SheBelieves Cup

This article lists the squads for the 2024 SheBelieves Cup, the 9th edition of the SheBelieves Cup. The cup consists of a series of friendly games, and was held in the United States from 6 to 9 April 2024. The four national teams involved in the tournament register a squad of 23 players.

The age listed for each player is on 6 April 2024, the first day of the tournament. The number of caps and goals listed for each player excludes any matches played after the tournament began. The club listed is the club for which the player last played a competitive match prior to the tournament. The nationality for each club reflects the national association (not the league) to which the club is affiliated. A flag is included for coaches that are of a different nationality than their own national team.

== Squads ==
=== Brazil ===
Coach: Arthur Elias

The final 23-player squad was announced on 15 March 2024.

No.	Pos.	Player	Date of birth (age)	Caps	Goals	Club
1	GK	Lorena	6 May 1997 (aged 26)	20	0	(Brazilian Football Confederation) Grêmio
2	DF	Antônia	26 April 1994 (aged 29)	38	1	(Royal Spanish Football Federation) Levante
3	DF	Tarciane	27 May 2003 (aged 20)	5	0	(Brazilian Football Confederation) Corinthians
4	DF	Thaís	1 May 1996 (aged 27)	8	0	(Royal Spanish Football Federation) Tenerife
5	MF	Julia Bianchi	7 October 1997 (aged 26)	18	2	(United States Soccer Federation) Chicago Red Stars
6	DF	Tamires	10 October 1987 (aged 36)	147	7	(Brazilian Football Confederation) Corinthians
7	FW	Ludmila	1 December 1994 (aged 29)	45	6	(Royal Spanish Football Federation) Atlético Madrid
8	MF	Angelina	26 January 2000 (aged 24)	25	1	(United States Soccer Federation) Orlando Pride
9	FW	Jheniffer	6 November 2001 (aged 22)	0	0	(Brazilian Football Confederation) Corinthians
10	FW	Marta	19 February 1986 (aged 38)	184	116	(United States Soccer Federation) Orlando Pride
11	FW	Cristiane	15 May 1985 (aged 38)	153	96	(Brazilian Football Confederation) Flamengo
12	GK	Tainá	1 May 1995 (aged 28)	0	0	(Brazilian Football Confederation) América Mineiro
13	DF	Fe Palermo	18 August 1996 (aged 27)	10	1	(Brazilian Football Confederation) Palmeiras
14	DF	Lauren	13 September 2002 (aged 21)	20	0	(United States Soccer Federation) Kansas City Current
15	MF	Vitória Yaya	23 January 2002 (aged 22)	6	1	(Brazilian Football Confederation) Corinthians
16	DF	Yasmim	28 October 1996 (aged 27)	11	3	(Brazilian Football Confederation) Corinthians
17	FW	Jaqueline	23 January 2002 (aged 22)	4	1	(Brazilian Football Confederation) Corinthians
18	FW	Gabi Portilho	18 July 1995 (aged 28)	18	1	(Brazilian Football Confederation) Corinthians
19	FW	Priscila	22 August 2004 (aged 19)	3	1	(Brazilian Football Confederation) Internacional
21	MF	Ana Vitória	6 March 2000 (aged 24)	16	2	(Royal Spanish Football Federation) Atlético Madrid
22	GK	Gabi Barbieri	7 March 2003 (aged 21)	1	0	(Brazilian Football Confederation) Flamengo
23	MF	Lais Estevam	26 November 2000 (aged 23)	0	0	(Brazilian Football Confederation) Palmeiras

=== Canada ===
Coach: (England) Bev Priestman

The final 23-player squad was announced on 28 March 2024. The following week, Quinn and Olivia Smith withdrew from the squad due to injuries and were replaced by Emma Regan and Marie-Yasmine Alidou. On the opening day of the tournament,Lysianne Proulx withdrew from the squad after being injured in training and was replaced by Anna Karpenko.

No.	Pos.	Player	Date of birth (age)	Caps	Goals	Club
1	GK	Kailen Sheridan	July 16, 1995 (aged 28)	47	0	(United States Soccer Federation) San Diego Wave
2	FW	Clarissa Larisey	July 2, 1999 (aged 24)	9	1	(Swedish Football Association) Häcken
3	DF	Kadeisha Buchanan	November 5, 1995 (aged 28)	145	5	(The Football Association) Chelsea
4	DF	Shelina Zadorsky	October 24, 1992 (aged 31)	99	6	(The Football Association) West Ham United
5	DF	Emma Regan	January 28, 2000 (aged 24)	2	0	(Danish Football Association) HB Køge
6	FW	Deanne Rose	March 3, 1999 (aged 25)	82	11	(The Football Association) Leicester City
7	MF	Julia Grosso	August 29, 2000 (aged 23)	60	3	(Italian Football Federation) Juventus
9	FW	Jordyn Huitema	May 8, 2001 (aged 22)	78	21	(United States Soccer Federation) Seattle Reign
8	MF	Marie-Yasmine Alidou	April 28, 1995 (aged 28)	2	0	(Portuguese Football Federation) Benfica
10	DF	Ashley Lawrence	June 11, 1995 (aged 28)	130	8	(The Football Association) Chelsea
11	MF	Desiree Scott	July 31, 1987 (aged 36)	185	0	(United States Soccer Federation) Kansas City Current
12	DF	Jade Rose	February 12, 2003 (aged 21)	17	0	(United States Soccer Federation) Harvard Crimson
13	MF	Simi Awujo	September 23, 2003 (aged 20)	13	1	(United States Soccer Federation) USC Trojans
14	DF	Vanessa Gilles	March 11, 1996 (aged 28)	38	3	(French Football Federation) Lyon
15	FW	Evelyne Viens	February 6, 1997 (aged 27)	27	5	(Italian Football Federation) Roma
16	FW	Janine Beckie	August 20, 1994 (aged 29)	101	36	(United States Soccer Federation) Portland Thorns
17	MF	Jessie Fleming	March 11, 1998 (aged 26)	128	19	(United States Soccer Federation) Portland Thorns
18	GK	Sabrina D'Angelo	May 11, 1993 (aged 30)	15	0	(The Football Association) Arsenal
19	FW	Adriana Leon	October 2, 1992 (aged 31)	110	37	(The Football Association) Aston Villa
20	FW	Cloé Lacasse	July 7, 1993 (aged 30)	32	4	(The Football Association) Arsenal
21	DF	Gabrielle Carle	October 12, 1998 (aged 25)	43	1	(United States Soccer Federation) Washington Spirit
22	GK	Anna Karpenko	April 10, 2002 (aged 21)	0	0	(United States Soccer Federation) Harvard Crimson
23	DF	Bianca St-Georges	July 28, 1997 (aged 26)	10	0	(United States Soccer Federation) North Carolina Courage

=== Japan ===
Coach: Futoshi Ikeda

The final 22-player squad was announced on 28 March 2024.

No.	Pos.	Player	Date of birth (age)	Caps	Goals	Club
1	GK	Ayaka Yamashita	29 September 1995 (aged 28)	67	0	(Japan Football Association) INAC Kobe Leonessa
2	DF	Risa Shimizu	15 June 1996 (aged 27)	75	4	(The Football Association) West Ham United
3	DF	Moeka Minami	7 December 1998 (aged 25)	48	4	(Italian Football Federation) Roma
4	DF	Saki Kumagai	17 October 1990 (aged 33)	149	2	(Italian Football Federation) Roma
5	DF	Miyabi Moriya	22 August 1996 (aged 27)	6	2	(Japan Football Association) INAC Kobe Leonessa
6	MF	Hina Sugita	31 January 1997 (aged 27)	46	3	(United States Soccer Federation) Portland Thorns
7	MF	Hinata Miyazawa	28 November 1999 (aged 24)	33	9	(The Football Association) Manchester United
8	FW	Mami Ueno	27 September 1996 (aged 27)	11	1	(Japan Football Association) Sanfrecce Hiroshima Regina
9	FW	Riko Ueki	30 July 1999 (aged 24)	32	11	(The Football Association) West Ham United
10	MF	Fūka Nagano	9 March 1999 (aged 25)	35	1	(The Football Association) Liverpool
11	FW	Mina Tanaka	28 April 1994 (aged 29)	77	34	(Japan Football Association) INAC Kobe Leonessa
12	DF	Rion Ishikawa	4 July 2003 (aged 20)	6	0	(Japan Football Association) Urawa Red Diamonds
13	DF	Hikaru Kitagawa	10 May 1997 (aged 26)	7	0	(Japan Football Association) INAC Kobe Leonessa
14	MF	Yui Hasegawa	29 January 1997 (aged 27)	80	20	(The Football Association) Manchester City
15	FW	Aoba Fujino	27 January 2004 (aged 20)	19	4	(Japan Football Association) Tokyo Verdy Beleza
16	MF	Honoka Hayashi	19 May 1998 (aged 25)	31	2	(The Football Association) West Ham United
17	DF	Kiko Seike	8 August 1996 (aged 27)	18	6	(Japan Football Association) Urawa Red Diamonds
18	GK	Chika Hirao	31 December 1996 (aged 27)	7	0	(Japan Football Association) Albirex Niigata
19	MF	Momoko Tanikawa	7 May 2005 (aged 18)	3	0	(Swedish Football Association) Rosengård
20	DF	Tōko Koga	6 January 2006 (aged 18)	4	0	(Royal Dutch Football Association) Feyenoord
21	GK	Shu Ohba	11 July 2002 (aged 21)	0	0	(United States Soccer Federation) Ole Miss Rebels
22	FW	Maika Hamano	9 May 2004 (aged 19)	6	0	(The Football Association) Chelsea

=== United States ===
Coach: Twila Kilgore

The final 23-player squad was announced on 26 March 2024.

No.	Pos.	Player	Date of birth (age)	Caps	Goals	Club
1	GK	Alyssa Naeher	April 20, 1988 (aged 35)	102	0	(United States Soccer Federation) Chicago Red Stars
2	DF	Abby Dahlkemper	May 13, 1993 (aged 30)	82	0	(United States Soccer Federation) San Diego Wave
3	DF	Jenna Nighswonger	November 28, 2000 (aged 23)	6	2	(United States Soccer Federation) Gotham FC
4	DF	Naomi Girma	June 14, 2000 (aged 23)	30	0	(United States Soccer Federation) San Diego Wave
5	MF	Olivia Moultrie	September 17, 2005 (aged 18)	4	2	(United States Soccer Federation) Portland Thorns
6	DF	Eva Gaetino	December 17, 2002 (aged 21)	0	0	(French Football Federation) Paris Saint-Germain
7	FW	Catarina Macario	October 4, 1999 (aged 24)	17	8	(The Football Association) Chelsea
8	FW	Jaedyn Shaw	November 20, 2004 (aged 19)	10	6	(United States Soccer Federation) San Diego Wave
9	FW	Mallory Swanson	April 29, 1998 (aged 25)	88	32	(United States Soccer Federation) Chicago Red Stars
10	MF	Lindsey Horan	May 26, 1994 (aged 29)	144	33	(French Football Federation) Lyon
11	FW	Sophia Smith	August 10, 2000 (aged 23)	44	16	(United States Soccer Federation) Portland Thorns
12	DF	Tierna Davidson	September 19, 1998 (aged 25)	55	1	(United States Soccer Federation) Gotham FC
13	FW	Alex Morgan	July 2, 1989 (aged 34)	221	123	(United States Soccer Federation) San Diego Wave
14	MF	Emily Sonnett	November 25, 1993 (aged 30)	88	2	(United States Soccer Federation) Gotham FC
15	MF	Korbin Albert	October 13, 2003 (aged 20)	7	0	(French Football Federation) Paris Saint-Germain
16	MF	Lily Yohannes	June 12, 2007 (aged 16)	0	0	(Royal Dutch Football Association) Ajax
17	MF	Sam Coffey	December 31, 1998 (aged 25)	13	1	(United States Soccer Federation) Portland Thorns
18	GK	Casey Murphy	April 25, 1996 (aged 27)	18	0	(United States Soccer Federation) North Carolina Courage
19	DF	Crystal Dunn	July 3, 1992 (aged 31)	143	24	(United States Soccer Federation) Gotham FC
20	DF	Casey Krueger	August 23, 1990 (aged 33)	45	0	(United States Soccer Federation) Washington Spirit
21	GK	Jane Campbell	February 17, 1995 (aged 29)	7	0	(United States Soccer Federation) Houston Dash
22	FW	Trinity Rodman	May 20, 2002 (aged 21)	34	7	(United States Soccer Federation) Washington Spirit
23	DF	Emily Fox	July 5, 1998 (aged 25)	45	1	(The Football Association) Arsenal

== Player representation ==
=== By club ===
Clubs with 3 or more players represented are listed.

Players	Club(s)
8	(Brazil) Corinthians
6	(United States) Portland Thorns
5	(United States) San Diego Wave
4	(England) Chelsea, (England) West Ham United, (Japan) INAC Kobe Leonessa, (United States) Gotham FC
3	(England) Arsenal, (Italy) Roma, (United States) Orlando Pride, (United States) Washington Spirit

=== By club nationality ===
Players	Club(s)
34	United States
16	England
15	Brazil
9	Japan
4	France, Italy, Spain
2	Netherlands, Sweden
1	Portugal

=== By club federation ===
Players	Federation
34	CONCACAF
33	UEFA
15	CONMEBOL
9	AFC

=== By representatives of domestic league ===
Players	National squad
17	United States
15	Brazil
9	Japan
0	Canada
