= 2025–26 Everton F.C. (women) season =

Everton
2025–26 season
- Head coach: Brian Sørensen (until 4 February 2026); Scott Phelan (interim) (interim from 4 February 2026)
- Stadium: Goodison Park, Liverpool
- WSL: 8th
- FA Cup: Fifth round
- League Cup: 2nd
- Top goalscorer: League: Vignolla, Gago, Hayashi (4); All: Yūka Momiki (6)
Home colours	Away colours	Third colours

The 2025–26 Everton F.C. (women) season was the club's ninth consecutive campaign in the Women's Super League, the highest level of the football pyramid. Along with competing in the WSL, the club will also contest two domestic cup competitions: the FA Cup and the League Cup.

This would be the club's first season at Goodison Park, moving from Walton Hall Park after the men's team moved from Goodison Park to Hill Dickinson Stadium.

== Season summary ==
Everton renewed one year contracts with Lucy Hope and Aurora Galli, whilst Kelly Gago signed a new three year contract with the club.

On 29 July 2025, Everton sold the women's team to parent company Roundhouse Capital Holdings, allowing the women's team to gain minority investment.

On 3 September 2025, Everton signed Ruby Mace for an undisclosed club record fee.

On 6 September 2025, Ornella Vignola scored a hat-trick against Liverpool, the first men's or women's Everton player to score a hat-trick in the Merseyside Derby since Dixie Dean, who did in 1931.

On 7 December 2025, Everton ended Chelsea's 31 game unbeaten run after a goal from Honoka Hayashi.

On 18 January 2026, Ellie Jones signed her first professional contract with the club.

On 4 February 2026, Everton announced that they had terminated the contract of Brian Sørensen, with under-18s coach Scott Phelan being named as the interim coach for the remainder of the season.

On 6 February 2026, Hayashi signed a one and a half year contract extension with the club, with a club option of a further year.

On 12 February 2026, Everton announced that Phil Jevons would join the backroom staff as an interim coach until the end of the season.

On 13 February 2026, Courtney Brosnan signed a two and a half year contract with the club.

On 22 April 2026, it was announced that Everton women would be participating in the World Sevens Football tournament for the first time, starting in May 2026.

On 21 May 2026, Ruby Mace was announced as Young Player of the season.

== Current squad ==
As of 4 April 2026

No.	Nat	Name	Date of birth (age)	Signed from	Since
Goalkeepers
1	(Republic of Ireland)	Courtney Brosnan	10 November 1995 (age 30)	(England) West Ham United	2021
12	(England)	Emily Ramsey	16 November 2000 (age 25)	(England) Manchester United	2022
Defenders
2	(England)	Hannah Blundell	25 May 1994 (age 32)	(England) Manchester United	2026
3	(Japan)	Rion Ishikawa	4 July 2003 (age 23)	(Japan) Urawa Red Diamonds Ladies	2025
5	(Spain)	Martina Fernández	1 October 2004 (age 21)	(Spain) Barcelona	2025
13	(Japan)	Hikaru Kitagawa	10 May 1997 (age 29)	(Sweden) BK Häcken FF	2025
17	(Scotland)	Lucy Hope	10 October 1996 (age 29)	(England) Bristol City	2019
20	(England)	Megan Finnigan	2 April 1998 (age 28)	Everton's academy	2015
27	(Norway)	Elise Stenevik	9 September 1999 (age 26)	(Sweden) Eskilstuna United DFF	2022
33	(Philippines)	Maz Pacheco	25 August 1998 (age 27)	(England) Aston Villa	2025
Midfielders
6	(Japan)	Honoka Hayashi	19 May 1998 (age 28)	(England) West Ham United	2024
7	(Australia)	Clare Wheeler	14 January 1998 (age 28)	(Denmark) Fortuna Hjørring	2022
8	(Netherlands)	Rosa van Gool	9 February 2004 (age 22)	(Netherlands) Ajax	2025
16	(England)	Laila Harbert	3 January 2007 (age 19)	(England) Arsenal	2026
18	(Spain)	Ornella Vignola	30 September 2004 (age 21)	(Spain) Granada	2025
21	(Slovenia)	Zara Kramžar	10 January 2006 (age 20)	(Italy) Roma	2026
22	(Italy)	Aurora Galli	13 December 1996 (age 29)	(Italy) Juventus	2021
28	(Denmark)	Karen Holmgaard	28 January 1999 (age 27)	(Germany) Turbine Potsdam	2022
29	(Japan)	Yūka Momiki	9 April 1996 (age 30)	Free agent	2025
30	(England)	Ruby Mace	5 September 2003 (age 22)	(England) Leicester City	2025
32	(England)	Macy Settle			
34	(England)	Ellie Jones			
Forwards
9	(Nigeria)	Toni Payne	22 April 1995 (age 31)	(Spain) Sevilla	2024
10	(Spain)	Inma Gabarro	5 November 2002 (age 23)	(Spain) Sevilla	2024
11	(France)	Kelly Gago	5 January 1999 (age 27)	(France) FC Nantes	2024
14	(England)	Melissa Lawley	28 April 1994 (age 32)	(England) Liverpool	2024
25	(Netherlands)	Katja Snoeijs	31 August 1996 (age 29)	(France) Bordeaux	2022

== Preseason ==
10 August 2025 Friendly	Everton	0–0	Leicester City	King Power Stadium
		Report		Attendance: Behind-closed-doors

14 August 2025 Friendly	Everton	0–1	Sheffield United	Walton Hall Park
		Report	79'	Attendance: Behind-closed-doors

20 August 2025 Friendly	Everton	3–0	FC Midtjylland	Vildbjerg Stadium
	Hayashi 5'; Momiki 12'; Vignolla 43'	Report

30 August 2025 Friendly	Everton	2–3	Juventus	Goodison Park
		Report

== Women's Super League ==
=== Results ===
7 September 2025 1	Liverpool	1–4	Everton	Liverpool
12:00	Kapocs 12'; Nagano (yellow card) 62'	Report	Vignola 24', 54', 56'; Snoeijs 45+4'; Van Gool (yellow card) 49'	Stadium: Anfield; Referee: Melissa Burgin

14 September 2025 2	Everton	0–2	Tottenham Hotspur	Liverpool
14:30	van Gool (yellow card) 68'	Report	Ahtinen 27'; Tandberg (yellow card) 31', (goal) 49'; Summanen (yellow card) 86'	Stadium: Goodison Park; Attendance: 6,473; Referee: Kirsty Dowle

19 September 2025 3	Everton	1–2	London City Lionesses	Liverpool
19:30	Pacheco (yellow card) 7'; Mace (yellow card) 34'; Wheeler (yellow card) 37'; Vignola (yellow card) 56'; Momiki 71' (pen.)	Report	Goodwin 13', 58'; Sangaré (yellow card) 81'; Asllani (yellow card) 90+3'	Stadium: Goodison Park; Attendance: 4,313; Referee: Ryan Atkins

28 September 2025 4	Brighton & Hove Albion	1–0	Everton	Crawley
12:00	Agyemang 28', (yellow card) 56'; Rule (yellow card) 41'; McLauchlan (yellow card) 72'; Symonds (yellow card) 78'	Report	Mace (yellow card) 22'; Wheeler (yellow card) 66'; Robinson (yellow card) 80'	Stadium: Broadfield Stadium; Attendance: 1,722; Referee: Stacey Pearson

5 October 2025 5	Leicester City	1–1	Everton	Leicester
15:00	Thibaud (yellow card) 32'; Ale (yellow card) 73'; Mouchon 81'; Cayman (yellow card) 90+1'	Report	Vignola 51'; Pacheco (yellow card) 66'	Stadium: King Power Stadium; Referee: Lisa Benn

12 October 2025 6	Everton	1–4	Manchester United	Liverpool
14:00	Hayashi 16'	Report	Sandberg (yellow card) 54'; Malard 62'; Kitagawa 70' (o.g.); Park 84', 89'	Stadium: Hill Dickinson Stadium; Attendance: 18,154; Referee: Stacey Fullicks

2 November 2025 7	Aston Villa	3–3	Everton	Birmingham
15:00	Mullet 45+8'; Maritz (yellow card) 54'; Hanson 59'; Mace 74' (og.)	Report	Gago 11', 90+4'; Hayashi (yellow card) 55'; Kitagawa 70'	Stadium: Villa Park; Attendance: 2,678; Referee: Stacey Fullicks

9 November 2025 8	Everton	1–2	Manchester City	Liverpool
14:00	Gago 40'; Pacheco (yellow card) 57'; Snoeijs (yellow card) 88'	Report	Miedema 21'; Shaw 54'	Stadium: Goodison Park; Referee: William Davis

16 November 2025 9	West Ham	3–1	Everton	Dagenham
12:00	Denton 32'; Tysiak 41', (yellow card) 90+1'; Martinez 54'	Report	Payne (yellow card) 47'; Wheeler (yellow card) 58'; Fernández (yellow card) 69'; Snoeijs 88'	Stadium: Victoria Road; Referee: Declan Brown

6 December 2025 10	Chelsea	0–1	Everton	Kingston upon Thames
17:15		Report	Hayashi 12'; Hobson (yellow card) 90'; Ishikawa (yellow card) 90+3'	Stadium: Kingsmeadow; Referee: Emily Heaslip

13 December 2025 11	Everton	1–3	Arsenal	Liverpool
12:00	Hayashi 13'; Fernández (yellow card) 89'; Mace (yellow card) 90+4'	Report	McCabe 11'; Russo 15'; Smith 87'	Stadium: Goodison Park; Attendance: 4,343; Referee: Stacey Pearson

11 January 2026 12	Manchester City	2–0	Everton	Manchester
12:00	Kerolin 26'; Miedema 63'; Greenwood (yellow card) 74'	Report		Stadium: Academy Stadium; Referee: Adewunmi Soneye

23 January 2026 13	Everton	0–1	Brighton & Hove Albion	Liverpool
19:00	Hayashi (yellow card) 26'	Report	Čanković 41'	Stadium: Goodison Park; Referee: Oliver Mackey

1 February 2026 14	Everton	2–1	Aston Villa	Liverpool
14:00	Mace (yellow card) 16'; Fernández 32', 89'; Brosnan (yellow card) 45'	Report	Salmon 13'; Patten (yellow card) 30'	Stadium: Goodison Park; Referee: Stacey Fullicks

8 February 2026 15	London City Lionesses	0–1	Everton	Bromley
12:00	Geyoro (yellow card) 52'; Fernández (yellow card) 84'; Sangaré (yellow card) 84'	Report	Gabarro 62'; Fernández (yellow card) 72'	Stadium: Hayes Lane; Referee: Emily Heaslip

15 February 2026 16	Everton	1–0	West Ham	Liverpool
12:00	Hayashi 8'; Gabarro (yellow card) 62'	Report	Cascarino (yellow card) 72'	Stadium: Goodison Park; Referee: Megan Wilson

15 March 2026 17	Tottenham Hotspur	1–2	Everton	Leyton
11:55	Gaupset 76'	Report	Momiki 12'; Gago 83'; Gabarro (yellow card) 85'	Stadium: Brisbane Road; Referee: Lisa Benn

21 March 2026 18	Manchester United	2–1	Everton	Leigh
12:30	Lundkvist (yellow card) 35'; Terland 38'; Zigiotti Olme (yellow card) 81'; Malard 90+4'	Report	Kramžar (yellow card) 23'; Fernández (yellow card) 28'; Gabarro 90'	Stadium: Leigh Sports Village; Referee: Melissa Burgin

28 March 2026 19	Everton	2–3	Liverpool	Liverpool
12:00	Galli 64'; Kramžar 90+1'; Mace (yellow card) 90+6'	Report	Holland 11', 41' (pen.) (yellow card) 90+6'; Fernández 20' (o.g.); Kapocs (yellow card) 63'; Fisk (yellow card) (red card) 66'; Falk (yellow card) 90+4'	Stadium: Goodison Park; Referee: Phoebe Cross

26 April 2026 20	Everton	1–4	Chelsea	Liverpool
14:00	Momiki 10'; Stenevik (yellow card) 87'	Report	Kerr 6', 47'; Charles (yellow card) 44'; Carpenter 53'; Cuthbert 70'	Stadium: Goodison Park; Referee: Ross Martin

13 May 2026 21	Arsenal	1–0	Everton	Holloway
19:00 BST	Blackstenius 90+3'	Report	Kramžar (yellow card) 28'; Wheeler (yellow card) 32'	Stadium: Emirates Stadium; Attendance: 25,068; Referee: Grace Lowe
Note: This fixture, originally scheduled for 3 May 2026 was postponed due to Arsenal's participation in the 2025–26 UEFA Women's Champions League knockout phase

16 May 2026 22	Everton	1–0	Leicester City	Liverpool
13:00 BST	Mace (yellow card) 62'; Pacheco 90+6'	Report	Tierney (yellow card) 44'	Stadium: Goodison Park; Referee: Alice Parker

=== League table ===
Pos	Team	Pld	W	D	L	GF	GA	GD	Pts
6	London City Lionesses	22	8	3	11	28	35	−7	27
7	Brighton & Hove Albion	22	7	5	10	27	28	−1	26
8	Everton	22	7	2	13	25	37	−12	23
9	Aston Villa	22	5	5	12	28	48	−20	20
10	West Ham United	22	5	4	13	20	45	−25	19

Source: WSL League Table
Rules for classification: 1) Points; 2) Goal difference; 3) Number of goals scored.

== Women's FA Cup ==
15 January 2026 Fourth round	West Bromwich Albion	0–5	Everton	Perry Barr
19:30	Orthodoxou (yellow card) 13'; Reynolds (yellow card) 45+4'	Report	Momiki 9', 34'; Vignola 50'; Payne 53'; Hobson 54'; Mace (yellow card) 56'	Stadium: Alexander Stadium; Attendance: 411; Referee: Lauren Impey

22 February 2026 Fifth round	Liverpool	2–1	Everton	St Helens
14:00	Enderby 34'; Olsson 45'	Report	Falk 72' (o.g.)	Stadium: BrewDog Stadium; Referee: Adewunmi Soneye

== Women's League Cup ==
24 September 2025 Group stage	Manchester City	3–1	Everton	Manchester
19:00	Rose 21'; Hasegawa 53'; Miedema 76'; Beney (yellow card) 86'	Report	Mace (yellow card) 66'; Kitagawa 82'	Stadium: Academy Stadium; Attendance: 1,350; Referee: Sophie Dennington

19 October 2025 Group stage	Everton	1–1 (4–3 p)	Nottingham Forest	Walton
14:00	Gago 59'; Wheeler (yellow card) 79'	Report	Stapleton (yellow card) 14'; Claypole 56' (pen.)	Stadium: Goodison Park; Attendance: 1,500; Referee: Adewunmi Soneye
	Penalties
	Gago (penalty scored); Stenevik (penalty scored); Weir (penalty missed); Wheeler (penalty scored); Pacheco (penalty scored)		Claypole (penalty scored); Olding (penalty scored); Wellings (penalty missed); Green (penalty scored); Boye-Hlorkah (penalty missed)

23 November 2025 Group stage	Newcastle United	1–3	Everton	Gateshead
14:00	Lumsden 79'; Mannion (yellow card) 81'; McQuade (yellow card) 90+2'	Report	Momiki 31'; Snoeijs 72'; Fernández (yellow card) 72'; Payne 74'; Hayashi (yellow card) 90+3'	Stadium: Gateshead International Stadium; Referee: Adewunmi Soneye

Pos	Team	Pld	W	PW	PL	L	GF	GA	GD	Pts	Qualification
1	Manchester City	3	2	1	0	0	8	4	+4	8	Advanced to knockout stage
2	Everton	3	1	1	0	1	5	5	0	5	
3	Nottingham Forest	3	1	0	1	1	3	4	−1	4	
4	Newcastle United	3	0	0	1	2	5	8	−3	1	

Source: Women's League Cup
Rules for classification: 1) Points; 2) Goal difference; 3) Number of goals scored; 4) Number of wins; 5) Head-to-head record

== Squad statistics ==
=== Appearances ===
Starting appearances are listed first, followed by substitute appearances after the + symbol where applicable.

As of match played 16 May 2026

No.	Pos.	Nat.	Player	Women's Super League		FA Cup		League Cup		Total	
No.	Pos.	Nat.	Player	Apps	Goals	Apps	Goals	Apps	Goals	Apps	Goals
1	GK	(Republic of Ireland)	Courtney Brosnan	16	0	1	0	1	0	18	0
2	DF	(England)	Hannah Blundell	9+1	0	1+1	0	0	0	12	0
3	DF	(Japan)	Rion Ishikawa	7+2	0	0	0	2	0	11	0
4	DF	(England)	Issy Hobson	1+3	0	1	1	0	0	5	1
5	DF	(Spain)	Martina Fernández	22	2	2	0	3	0	27	2
6	MF	(Japan)	Honoka Hayashi	16+3	4	1	0	3	0	23	4
7	MF	(Australia)	Clare Wheeler	17+3	0	1+1	0	2+1	0	25	0
8	MF	(Netherlands)	Rosa van Gool	14+5	0	2	0	2+1	0	24	0
9	FW	(Nigeria)	Toni Payne	13+6	0	1+1	1	1+2	1	24	2
10	FW	(Spain)	Inma Gabarro	4+2	2	1	0	0	0	7	2
11	FW	(France)	Kelly Gago	6+9	4	0+1	0	2	1	18	5
12	GK	(England)	Emily Ramsey	6	0	1	0	2	0	9	0
13	DF	(Japan)	Hikaru Kitagawa	11+4	1	1+1	0	2+1	1	20	2
14	FW	(England)	Melissa Lawley	0+5	0	0+2	0	0	0	7	0
16	MF	(England)	Laila Harbert	0+1	0	0	0	0	0	1	0
18	MF	(Spain)	Ornella Vignola	21+1	4	2	1	2+1	0	27	5
21	MF	(Slovenia)	Zara Kramžar	5+2	1	0+1	0	0	0	8	1
22	MF	(Italy)	Aurora Galli	5+5	1	1+1	0	0	0	12	1
25	FW	(Netherlands)	Katja Snoeijs	6+7	2	0	0	0+1	1	14	3
27	DF	(Norway)	Elise Stenevik	5+2	0	0	0	2	0	9	0
28	MF	(Denmark)	Karen Holmgaard	4+7	0	1	0	0+2	0	14	0
29	FW	(Japan)	Yūka Momiki	16+5	3	2	2	3	1	26	6
30	FW	(England)	Ruby Mace	20+1	0	2	0	1+1	0	25	0
33	FW	(Philippines)	Maz Pacheco	12+6	1	1	0	2	0	21	0
34	FW	(England)	Ellie Jones	0	0	0+1	0	0+1	0	2	0
Players who appeared for the club but left during the season:
16	MF	(Wales)	Hayley Ladd	1+4	0	0	0	1+1	0	7	0
19	FW	(England)	Katie Robinson	5+5	0	0	0	2	0	12	0
24	DF	(Scotland)	Kenzie Weir	0+1	0	0	0	0+2	0	3	0

== Transfers ==
=== Transfers in ===
Date	Position	Nationality	Name	From	Ref.
30 June 2025	FW	(Netherlands)	Rosa van Gool	(Netherlands) Ajax	
4 July 2025	FW	(Spain)	Ornella Vignola	(Spain) Granada	
7 July 2025	DF	(Japan)	Rion Ishikawa	(Japan) Urawa Red Diamonds Ladies	
9 July 2025	DF	(Japan)	Hikaru Kitagawa	(Sweden) BK Häcken	
11 July 2025	FW	(Japan)	Yūka Momiki	Free agent	
18 July 2025	DF	(Spain)	Martina Fernández	(Spain) Barcelona	
22 July 2025	DF	(Philippines)	Maz Pacheco	(England) Aston Villa	
3 September 2025	MF	(England)	Ruby Mace	(England) Leicester City	

=== Loans in ===
Date	Position	Nationality	Name	From	Until	Ref.
16 July 2025	FW	(England)	Katie Robinson	(England) Aston Villa	2 January 2026	
28 September 2025	GK	(England)	Katie Startup	(England) Manchester City	16 November 2025	
9 January 2026	DF	(England)	Hannah Blundell	(England) Manchester United	End of season	
28 January 2026	MF	(England)	Laila Harbert	(England) Arsenal	End of season	
3 February 2026	MF	(Slovenia)	Zara Kramžar	(Italy) Roma	End of season	

=== Transfers out ===
Date	Position	Nationality	Name	To	Ref.
9 May 2025	MF	(Denmark)	Karoline Olesen	(Sweden) Malmö FF	
9 May 2025	FW	(Denmark)	Rikke Madsen	(Denmark) HB Køge	
9 May 2025	DF	(Norway)	Maren Mjelde	(Norway) Arna-Bjørnar	
9 May 2025	MF	(Wales)	Lauren Thomas	(England) Sheffield United	
18 June 2025	MF	(Belgium)	Justine Vanhaevermaet	(England) Crystal Palace	
18 June 2025	FW	(Republic of Ireland)	Heather Payne	(England) Leicester City	
21 June 2025	MF	(Denmark)	Sara Holmgaard	(Spain) Real Madrid	
16 July 2025	MF	(Greece)	Veatriki Sarri	(England) Birmingham City	
11 January 2026	MF	(Wales)	Hayley Ladd	(England) Crystal Palace	

=== Loans out ===
Date	Position	Nationality	Name	To	Until	Ref.
30 June 2025	GK	(Portugal)	Inês Pereira	(Spain) Deportivo de La Coruña	End of season	
24 July 2025	FW	(England)	Melissa Lawley	(England) Burnley	10 January 2026	
4 September 2025	DF	(England)	Issy Hobson	(England) Nottingham Forest	1 October 2025	
11 September 2025	FW	(Spain)	Inma Gabarro	(Spain) Sevilla	28 January 2026	
27 January 2026	DF	(Scotland)	Kenzie Weir	(England) Ipswich Town	End of season	
1 April 2026	DF	(England)	Issy Hobson	(Norway) Rosenborg	June 2026	
