= Ornella Vignola =

Spanish footballer (born 2004)

Personal information
- Full name: Ornella Maria Vignola Cabot
- Date of birth: 30 September 2004 (age 22)
- Place of birth: Montevideo, Uruguay
- Height: 1.64 m (5 ft 5 in)
- Positions: Midfielder; winger

Team information
- Current team: Everton
- Number: 18

Senior career*
Years	Team	Apps	(Gls)
2019–2020	Málaga	6	(0)
2020–2022	Barcelona B	12	(2)
2020–2023	Barcelona	2	(0)
2022	→ Sevilla (loan)	15	(0)
2023	→ Alavés (loan)	11	(0)
2023–2025	Granada	57	(6)
2025–	Everton	24	(4)

International career^{‡}
2022–2024	Spain U20	26	(1)
2023–	Spain U23	9	(4)
2026–	Spain	1	(0)
Medal record
Women's football
Representing Spain
FIFA U-20 Women's World Cup
Winner	2022 Costa Rica
UEFA Women's Under-19 Championship
Winner	2022 Czech Republic
- * Club domestic league appearances and goals as of 06:03, 15 September 2026 (UTC) ‡ National team caps and goals as of 16:44, 3 April 2026 (UTC)

Ornella Maria Vignola Cabot (Spanish: [oɾˈneʎa maˈɾia biˈɲola kaˈβot]; born 30 September 2004) is a professional footballer who plays as a midfielder or winger for Women's Super League club Everton. Born in Uruguay, she plays for the Spain national team.

== Early life ==
Vignola was born on 30 September 2004 in Montevideo, Uruguay. At the age of one, she moved with her family to Spain and grew up in Benalmádena, Spain. The niece of Uruguayan television presenter Karina Vignola, she has an older brother.

== Club career ==
Vignola started her career with Spanish side Málaga B. Following her stint there, she signed for Spanish side Barcelona in 2020, where she made two league appearances and scored zero goals and helped the club win the league title. Two years later, she signed for Spanish side Sevilla, where she made fifteen league appearances and scored zero goals.

In 2023, she signed for Spanish side Alavés. The same year, she signed for Spanish side Granada, where she made fifty-seven league appearances and scored six goals.

=== Everton ===
On 4 July 2025, Vignola signed for Women's Super League club Everton. On 6 September, she made her debut for the club, scoring a hat-trick in a 4–1 derby victory over Liverpool, the first men's or women's Everton player to score a hat-trick in the Merseyside Derby since Dixie Dean in 1931.

== International career ==
Vignola is a Spain youth international. During the summer of 2022, she played for the Spain women's national under-20 football team at the 2022 FIFA U-20 Women's World Cup, helping the team win the competition.. Uncapped at full international level, Vignola might still be eligible for Spain and Uruguay.

== Style of play ==
Vignola plays as a midfielder or winger. Argentine news website Marcha Noticias wrote in 2019 that she "is comfortable in... attacking midfielder, winger, or playmaker. Her distinctive traits are speed and skill, enhanced by an intelligent vision".

== Career statistics ==
=== Club ===
As of match played 13 September 2026

Appearances and goals by club, season and competition
Club	Season	League			National cup (Note: Includes Copa de la Reina, Women's FA Cup)		League cup (Note: Includes Women's League Cup)		Continental		Total	
Club	Season	Division	Apps	Goals	Apps	Goals	Apps	Goals	Apps	Goals	Apps	Goals
Malaga	2019–20	Segunda Federación	6	0	0	0	—		—		6	0
Barcelona B	2020–21	Primera Federación	22	6	—		—		—		22	6
Barcelona B	2021–22	Primera Federación	25	4	—		—		—		25	4
Barcelona B	Total		47	10	0	0	0	0	0	0	47	10
Barcelona	2020–21	Primera División	1	0	0	0	—		1 (Note: Appearance(s) in UEFA Women's Champions League)	0	2	0
Barcelona	2021–22	Primera División	1	0	0	0	—		0	0	1	0
Barcelona	Total		2	0	0	0	0	0	1	0	3	0
Sevilla (loan)	2022–23	Liga F	4	0	0	0	—		—		4	0
Alavés (loan)	2022–23	Liga F	11	0	0	0	—		—		11	0
Granada	2023–24	Liga F	29	3	3	1	—		—		32	4
Granada	2024–25	Liga F	28	3	5	1	—		—		33	4
Granada	Total		57	6	8	2	0	0	0	0	65	8
Everton	2025–26	Women's Super League	22	4	2	1	3	0	—		27	5
Everton	2026–27	Women's Super League	2	0	0	0	0	0	—		2	0
Everton	Total		24	4	2	1	3	0	0	0	29	5
Career total			151	20	10	3	3	0	1	0	165	23

=== International ===
As of match played 8 March 2026

Appearances and goals by national team and year
National team	Year	Apps	Goals
Spain	2026	1	0
Total		1	0
