= Toni Payne =

Nigerian footballer (born 1995)

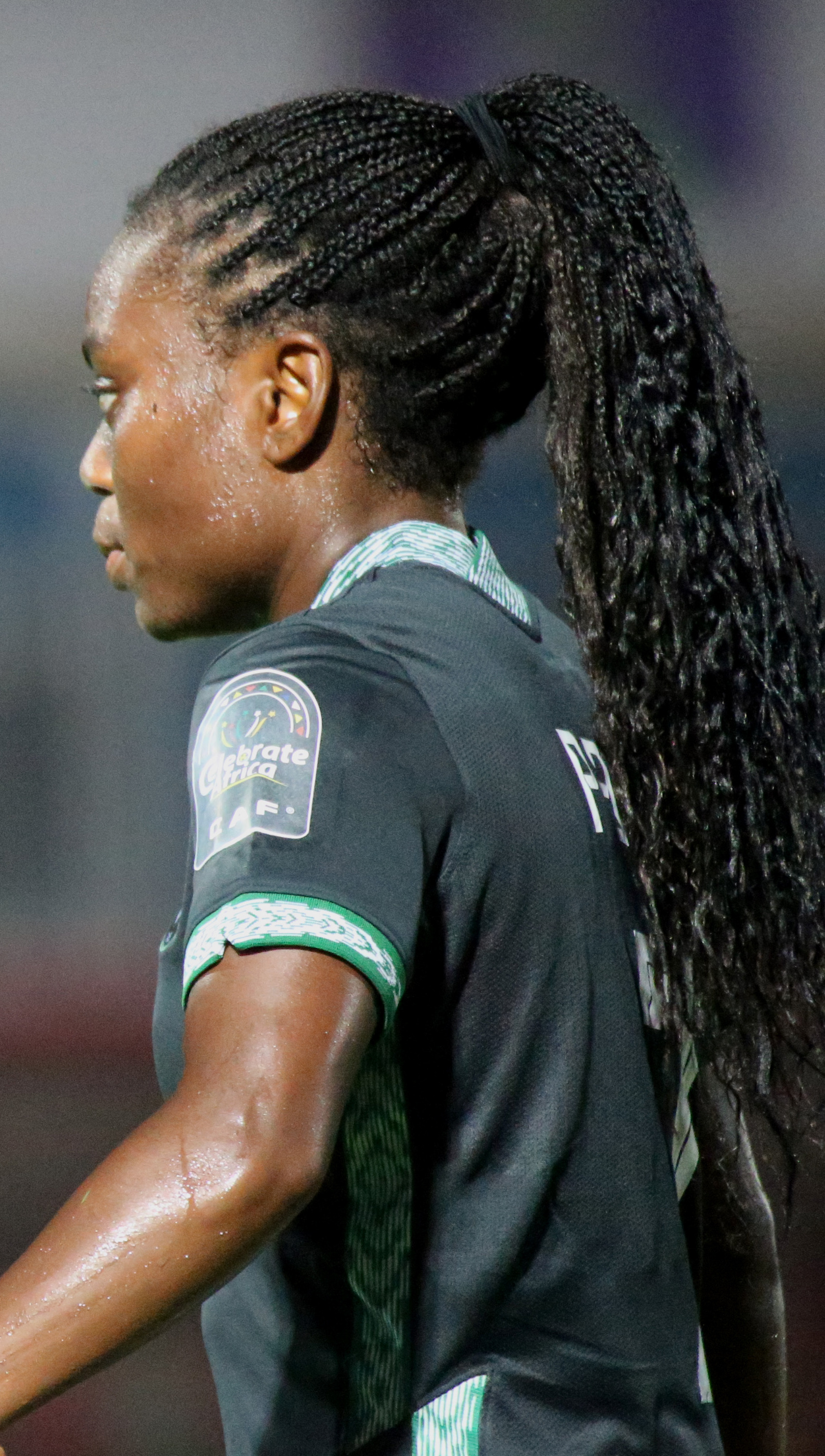

Personal information
- Full name: Antionette Oyèdúpẹ́ Payne
- Date of birth: 22 April 1995 (age 31)
- Place of birth: Birmingham, Alabama, U.S.
- Height: 1.63 m (5 ft 4 in)
- Positions: Midfielder; forward

Team information
- Current team: Inter Milan

College career
Years	Team	Apps	(Gls)
2013–2016	Duke Blue Devils	90	(23)

Senior career*
Years	Team	Apps	(Gls)
2017–2018	Ajax	22	(0)
2018–2024	Sevilla	168	(30)
2024–2026	Everton	41	(1)
2026–	Inter Milan	0	(0)

International career^{‡}
2012	United States U17	6	(3)
2013–2014	United States U20		
2016–2018	United States U23	1	(0)
2021–	Nigeria	54	(4)
- * Club domestic league appearances and goals as of 19 May 2026 ‡ National team caps and goals as of 31 October 2026

Antionette Oyedupe "Toni" Payne OON (Yoruba: [òjédupɛ́]; born 22 April 1995) is a professional footballer who plays as a forward for Serie A club Inter Milan. Born in the United States, she represents Nigeria at international level.

== Early life ==
Payne was born and raised in Birmingham, Alabama to Nigerian parents. She is the older sister of fellow footballers Stephen and Nicole Payne. She and her sister Nicole have played together in the Nigeria national team.

== Club career ==
In 2017, Ajax invited Payne for an internship, which led to her signing for the club. She made her league debut against ADO Den Haag on 19 May 2017. Payne scored her first league goal against PSV on 27 May 2018, scoring in the 16th minute.

On 4 July 2018, Payne was announced at Sevilla. She made her league debut against Albacete on 9 September 2018. Payne scored her first league goal against Rayo Vallecano on 16 September 2018, scoring in the 89th minute. On 18 June 2019, it was announced that her contract was extended for two further years.

On 19 July 2024, Payne was announced at Everton. On 7 December 2025, Payne assisted the goal for Honoka Hayashi to beat Chelsea 1–0, ending the longest unbeaten streak in Super League history of 34 matches. On 26 June 2026, it was announced that she would leave Everton when her contract expired.

On 12 July 2026, it was announced that Payne had signed a two-year contract with Serie A club Inter Milan until 30 June 2028.

== International career ==
Through birth and descent, Payne was eligible to play for the United States or Nigeria.

=== United States ===
Payne played for the United States under-17 team, and was in the team which won the 2012 CONCACAF U-17 Championship.

=== Nigeria ===
In 2019, Payne declared her intention to switch her international career to Nigeria. She made her senior debut on 18 February 2021 starting against Russian club CSKA Moscow at the Turkish Cup. Her first appearance facing a national team was two days later against Uzbekistan.

Payne was called up to the Nigeria squad for the 2022 Africa Cup of Nations.

On 16 June 2023, she was included in the 23-player Nigerian squad for the FIFA World Cup 2023.

Payne was called up to the Nigeria squad for the 2024 Summer Olympics.

On 20 June 2025, Payne was named in the final Nigeria squad for the 2024 Africa Cup of Nations.

== Career statistics ==
=== Club ===
As of match played 16 May 2026

Appearances and goals by club, season and competition
Club	Season	League			National cup (Note: Includes KNVB Women's Cup, Copa de la Reina, Women's FA Cup)		League cup (Note: Includes Women's League Cup)		Continental (Note: Includes UEFA Women's Champions League)		Total	
Club	Season	Division	Apps	Goals	Apps	Goals	Apps	Goals	Apps	Goals	Apps	Goals
Ajax	2016–17	Vrouwen Eredivisie	2	0	0	0	0	0	—		2	0
Ajax	2017–18	Vrouwen Eredivisie	20	0	1	1	0	0	3	0	24	1
Ajax	Total		22	0	1	1	0	0	3	0	26	1
Sevilla	2018–19	Liga F	27	7	3	0	—		—		30	7
Sevilla	2019–20	Liga F	21	4	3	0	—		—		24	4
Sevilla	2020–21	Liga F	33	5	1	0	—		—		34	5
Sevilla	2021–22	Liga F	29	5	2	0	—		—		31	5
Sevilla	2022–23	Liga F	28	3	1	0	—		—		29	3
Sevilla	2023–24	Liga F	30	6	2	0	—		—		32	6
Sevilla	Total		168	30	12	0	0	0	0	0	180	30
Everton	2024–25	Women's Super League	22	1	2	0	2	0	—		26	1
Everton	2025–26	Women's Super League	19	0	2	1	3	1	—		24	2
Everton	Total		41	1	4	1	5	1	0	0	50	3
Career total			231	31	17	2	5	1	3	0	253	34

=== International ===
As of match played 26 July 2025

Appearances and goals by national team and year
National team	Year	Apps	Goals
Nigeria	2021	7	1
Nigeria	2022	13	0
Nigeria	2023	13	0
Nigeria	2024	7	0
Nigeria	2025	6	0
Nigeria	2026	8	3
Total		54	4

Scores and results list Nigeria's goal tally first, score column indicates score after each Payne goal.

List of international goals scored by Toni Payne
No.	Date	Venue	Opponent	Score	Result	Competition
1	21 February 2021	Mtskheta Park, Manavgat, Turkey	Equatorial Guinea	7–0	9–0	2021 Turkish Women's Cup
2	5 June 2026	Remo Stars Stadium, Ikenne, Nigeria	Senegal	2–0	2–1	Friendly
3	13 October 2026	Remo Stars Stadium, Ikenne, Nigeria	Comoros	1–0	5−0	2028 CAF Women's Olympic qualifying tournament
4	13 October 2026	Remo Stars Stadium, Ikenne, Nigeria	Comoros	3−0	5−0	2028 CAF Women's Olympic qualifying tournament

== Honours ==
Nigeria

- Women's Africa Cup of Nations: 2024

Orders

- Officer of the Order of the Niger
