= Maz Pacheco =

English footballer

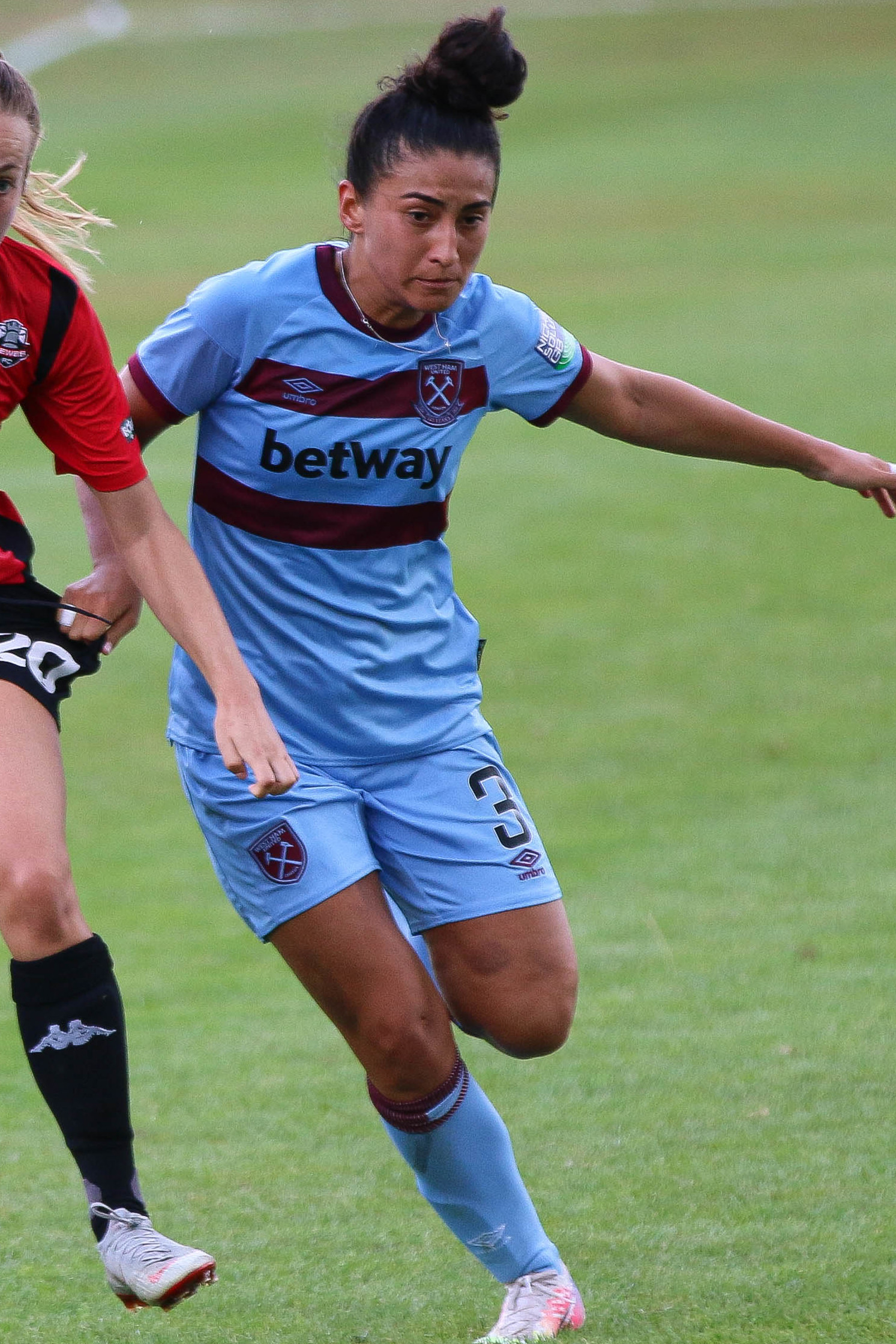

Personal information
- Full name: Mayumi Pacheco
- Date of birth: 25 August 1998 (age 28)
- Place of birth: Ormskirk, England
- Height: 5 ft 5 in (1.64 m)
- Position: Left-back

Team information
- Current team: Everton
- Number: 33

Youth career
- 2014–2015: Liverpool

Senior career*
Years	Team	Apps	(Gls)
2015–2017	Liverpool	12	(0)
2016	→ Doncaster Rovers Belles (loan)	10	(1)
2017–2018	Doncaster Rovers Belles	26	(1)
2018–2020	Reading	25	(0)
2020–2021	West Ham United	17	(0)
2021–2025	Aston Villa	71	(2)
2025–	Everton	20	(1)

International career^{‡}
2015	England U17	8	(1)
2016–2017	England U19	9	(0)
2017–2018	England U20	8	(0)
2019	England U21	10	(1)
Medal record
Women's football
Representing England
FIFA U-20 Women's World Cup
Third place	2018 France
- * Club domestic league appearances and goals as of 05:00, 15 September 2026 (UTC) ‡ National team caps and goals as of 17 January 2020

Mayumi "Maz" Pacheco (Tagalog: [mɐˈjume pɐˈtʃɛko]; born 25 August 1998) is a professional footballer who plays as a defender for Women's Super League club Everton. A former England youth international, she received her first senior call-up for the Philippines in 2024.

== Club career ==
Pacheco made a failed bid to join the youth team of FA WSL 1 side Liverpool in 2013 by participating in the club's trial. She managed to secure a place in the youth team the following year.

Pacheco began her senior career with Liverpool in 2015. She made her club debut on 25 March in a league loss to Sunderland. 11 more appearances followed during the 2015 and 2016 seasons before Pacheco left to join Doncaster Rovers Belles on loan for the remainder of the 2016 campaign. She went onto make 12 appearances and score 1 goal prior to signing a permanent contract at the beginning of 2017.

In July 2018, Pacheco signed for Reading, after helping Doncaster Rover Belles win the WSL 2 title. On 8 June 2020, Reading announced that Pacheco had left the club after her contract had expired.

On 10 July 2020, Pacheco signed for West Ham United.

On 16 August 2021, she signed for Aston Villa. She will leave Aston Villa when her contract expires in June 2025. Pacheco was Villa’s longest-serving player at the time of her departure from the club.

On 22 July 2025, Pacheco signed for Everton on a permanent transfer.

== International career ==
Pacheco played international youth football for England from under-17 level up to under-21 level, appearing in the finals of the 2015 U17 Euros, 2017 U19 Euros, and 2018 U20 World Cup.

In October 2024, Pacheco received her first call up to the Philippines women's national football team for fixtures against Jordan and DR Congo in the Pink Ladies Cup held in Antalya, Turkey. As of January 2025, she was yet to make her international debut as she is waiting for a Philippine passport.

== Personal life ==
Pacheco was born in Ormskirk. Her father is from the town, her mother comes from the Philippines, and she has two brothers. She graduated with a law degree from Sheffield University in 2020 As of November 2025, Pacheco is in a relationship with Leah Tyrer, who took part in the tenth series of Married at First Sight.

== Career statistics ==
=== Club ===
As of match played 13 September 2026.

Club	Season	League			FA Cup (Note: Includes Women's FA Cup)		League Cup (Note: Includes Women's League Cup)		Continental (Note: Includes UEFA Women's Champions League)		Total	
Club	Season	Division	Apps	Goals	Apps	Goals	Apps	Goals	Apps	Goals	Apps	Goals
Liverpool	2015	Women's Super League	9	0	0	0	7	0	0	0	16	0
Liverpool	2016	Women's Super League	3	0	0	0	0	0	0	0	3	0
Liverpool	Total		12	0	0	0	7	0	0	0	19	0
Doncaster Rovers Belles (loan)	2016	Women's Super League	10	1	0	0	2	0	—		12	1
Doncaster Rovers Belles	2017	Women's Super League 2	9	0	1	0	—		—		10	0
Doncaster Rovers Belles	2017–18	Women's Super League 2	17	1	0	0	3	0	—		20	1
Doncaster Rovers Belles	Total		26	1	1	0	3	0	0	0	30	1
Reading	2018–19	Women's Super League	16	0	2	0	2	0	—		20	0
Reading	2019–20	Women's Super League	9	0	2	1	5	0	—		16	1
Reading	Total		25	0	4	1	7	0	0	0	36	1
West Ham United	2020-21	Women's Super League	17	0	0	0	3	0	—		20	0
Aston Villa	2021–22	Women's Super League	22	0	1	0	2	0	—		25	0
Aston Villa	2022–23	Women's Super League	22	0	4	1	5	0	—		31	1
Aston Villa	2023–24	Women's Super League	18	1	0	0	5	1	—		23	2
Aston Villa	2024–25	Women's Super League	9	1	0	0	3	0	—		12	1
Aston Villa	Total		71	2	5	1	18	1	0	0	91	4
Everton	2025–26	Women's Super League	18	1	1	0	2	0	—		21	1
Everton	2026–27	Women's Super League	2	0	0	0	0	0	—		2	0
Everton	Total		20	1	1	0	2	0	0	0	23	1
Career total			181	4	11	2	39	1	0	0	231	7

== Honours ==
England U20s

- FIFA U-20 Women's World Cup third place: 2018
