= Ruby Mace =

English footballer (born 2003)

Personal information
- Full name: Ruby Mace
- Date of birth: 5 September 2003 (age 23)
- Place of birth: Upminster, England
- Height: 1.67 m (5 ft 6 in)
- Positions: Holding midfielder; centre-back

Team information
- Current team: Everton
- Number: 30

Youth career
- 2010–2020: Arsenal

Senior career*
Years	Team	Apps	(Gls)
2020–2021	Arsenal	3	(0)
2021	→ Birmingham City (dual reg)	11	(2)
2021–2024	Manchester City	13	(0)
2023	→ Leicester City (loan)	10	(0)
2024–2025	Leicester City	15	(0)
2025–	Everton	23	(0)

International career^{‡}
2019	England U17	4	(2)
2021–2022	England U19	7	(0)
2023–	England U23	9	(0)
2024–	England	1	(0)
- * Club domestic league appearances and goals as of 06:37, 15 September 2026 (UTC) ‡ National team caps and goals as of 21:26, 3 December 2024 (UTC)

Ruby Mace (born 5 September 2003) is an English professional footballer who plays as a midfielder and defender for Women's Super League club Everton and the England national team. She previously played for Leicester City, Manchester City, Birmingham City, and Arsenal.

== Early life ==
Raised in Upminster, in the London Borough of Havering, Mace is the youngest of three and attended Coopers' Company and Coborn School. Mace gained interest in football from watching her older brother play when she was three years old. She trained with boys teams soon after, playing competitively by age 5, and joined Arsenal Academy aged 7.

At 15 years old, the England Football Association nominated Mace to receive Sports Aid funding for £1,000 towards football-related costs. She remained at Arsenal until age 17.

== Club career ==
=== Arsenal ===
Mace made her Arsenal debut on 26 September 2020 against North London rivals Tottenham Hotspur in the postponed FA Cup quarter final of 2019–20 season. She came on in the 88th minute to replace captain Kim Little as Arsenal won 4–0. On 7 October 2020, Mace made another substitute appearance for Arsenal, this time against Chelsea in the 2020–21 League Cup, replacing Caitlin Foord in the 84th minute.

Mace made her WSL debut against Brighton & Hove Albion on 11 October 2020, coming on as a second-half substitute replacing Caitlin Foord in the 78th Minute. She made her second league appearance against Tottenham Hotspur on 18 October, again coming on as a second-half substitute, this time replacing Danielle van de Donk in the 77th minute.

Mace made her second League Cup appearance against London City Lionesses, coming on in the 46th minute replacing Jill Roord, in a game Arsenal won 4–0.

==== Birmingham City (dual registration) ====
On 2 February 2021, Mace signed for Birmingham City on dual registration for the rest of the 2020–21 WSL season.

=== Manchester City ===
On 11 June 2021, Mace signed her first professional contract with Manchester City ahead of her 18th birthday.

On 13 October 2021, she made her debut in the 2021–22 League Cup against Everton, playing the full 90 minutes, and receiving praise from fellow teenage teammate Jess Park. City would go on to win the League Cup that season. In April 2024, the Manchester Evening News stated that Mace was "widely regarded as one of England's brightest young talents".

On 18 May 2024, it was announced that Mace would leave the club upon the expiry of her contract.

==== Leicester City (loan) ====
I think it gave me confidence [the loan spell] especially at Leicester, I can't thank them enough for the platform that they put out for me to be able to play every week. It really meant a lot to me and the way that they trusted me in that position as well.

— Ruby Mace, October 2023

On 28 January 2023, Mace joined Leicester City on loan for the remainder of the 2022–23 season, and was credited with playing an important role in helping Leicester avoid relegation.

She made her debut for the club against Reading in the FA Cup on 29 January 2023, and on 21 May 2023, was sent off against West Ham United for a second yellow card.

=== Leicester City ===
On 20 July 2024, Mace re-joined Leicester City signing a two-year deal, having rejected offers from Spanish side Atlético Madrid and Women's Super League clubs, including Chelsea.

=== Everton ===
On 3 September 2025, Everton announced that Mace had signed for the Liverpool-based club, breaking a club record for her transfer fee. She initially signed on a three-year contract with the Blues, stating that the opportunity to play at Goodison for an ambitious club were key reasons to her wanting to join Everton. On 21 May 2026, she was announced as Young Player of the season.

== International career ==
=== Youth ===
In October 2017, Mace made her youth international debut with England's under-15s, captaining the team in a match against Scotland, going on to play for the U-17, U-19, and U-23 team.

Mace made her England under-17 debut captaining the team for 2020 U-17 Championship qualification against Bosnia and Herzegovina on 24 October 2019, in which England won 4–0. Three days later, on 27 October, Mace scored her first goal for the under-17s against Belgium.

On 20 October 2021, Mace made her debut for the under-19s in 2022 U-19 Championship qualification against Republic of Ireland in an 8–1, followed by playing against Switzerland in which England would win 1–0. In April 2022, she played further winning games for Championship qualification against Wales and Belgium at St George's Park, helping the squad to qualify for the final tournament in the Czech Republic.

In June 2022, Mace featured as part of the starting eleven for the under-19s in the 2022 U-19 Championship fixtures against Norway and Sweden as centre-back, in a win and a loss, prior to being replaced for the match against Germany due to injury.

Mace was first named as part of the squad for the England under-23s on 8 February 2023. Throughout 2023 she went on to play as the number 4 (a defensive midfielder), as part of the starting eleven, playing in fixtures against Spain, Belgium, Portugal, Norway, Italy, Portugal and France. In October 2023, in discussing the U23 side, Mace said her goal is "just pushing myself to be the best that I can be, to transform into the seniors.". In February 2024, BBC Sport listed Mace as one of the five future Lionesses, described as "one of England's most highly-rated youngsters". She captained the U23 team to a 3–0 win over Sweden to win the 2025-26 U23 European Competition title on 17 April 2026, being named Player of the Match.

=== Senior ===
Mace was first called up to the senior squad on 19 November 2024, for the friendly matches against the United States and Switzerland. In being selected, she became the first Leicester City women's player to be called up to the senior team. On 3 December, she made her debut against Switzerland in the starting eleven with England winning the game 1–0.

== Career statistics ==
=== Club ===
As of match played 13 September 2026

Appearances and goals by club, season and competition
Club	Season	League			FA Cup		League Cup		Continental		Total	
Club	Season	Division	Apps	Goals	Apps	Goals	Apps	Goals	Apps	Goals	Apps	Goals
Arsenal	2019–20	Women's Super League	0	0	1	0	0	0	0	0	1	0
Arsenal	2020–21	Women's Super League	3	0	0	0	3	0	0	0	6	0
Arsenal	Total		3	0	1	0	3	0	0	0	7	0
Birmingham City (loan)	2020–21	Women's Super League	11	2	2	0	0	0	0	0	13	2
Manchester City	2021–22	Women's Super League	7	0	2	0	6	0	0	0	15	0
Manchester City	2022–23	Women's Super League	1	0	0	0	4	0	0	0	5	0
Manchester City	2023–24	Women's Super League	5	0	1	0	3	0	—		9	0
Manchester City	Total		13	0	3	0	13	0	0	0	29	0
Leicester City (loan)	2022–23	Women's Super League	10	0	1	0	—		—		11	0
Leicester City	2024–25	Women's Super League	15	0	2	0	3	0	—		20	0
Everton	2025–26	Women's Super League	21	0	2	0	2	0	—		25	0
Everton	2026–27	Women's Super League	2	0	0	0	0	0	—		2	0
Everton	Total		23	0	2	0	2	0	0	0	27	0
Career total			75	2	11	0	21	0	0	0	107	2

=== International ===
As of match played 3 December 2024

Appearances and goals by national team and year
National team	Year	Apps	Goals
England	2024	1	0
Total		1	0

== Honours ==
Manchester City

- FA Women's League Cup: 2021–22

Individual

- Everton Women's Young Player of the Season: 2025–26
