= Rosa van Gool =

Dutch footballer (born 2004)

Personal information
- Date of birth: 9 February 2004 (age 22)
- Place of birth: Leiden, Netherlands
- Height: 1.62 m (5 ft 4 in)
- Positions: Midfielder; winger

Team information
- Current team: Everton
- Number: 8

Youth career
- Ter Leede

Senior career*
Years	Team	Apps	(Gls)
2022–2025	Ajax	55	(2)
2025–	Everton	21	(0)

International career^{‡}
2019	Netherlands U15	4	(1)
2020	Netherlands U16	4	(0)
2021–2023	Netherlands U19	20	(3)
2022	Netherlands U20	10	(2)
2023–	Netherlands U23	21	(1)
- * Club domestic league appearances and goals as of 06:39, 15 September 2026 (UTC) ‡ National team caps and goals as of 23:30, 8 October 2026 (UTC)

Rosa van Gool (Dutch: [ˈroː.za vɑn ɣul]; born 9 February 2004) is a Dutch professional footballer who plays as a midfielder for Women's Super League club Everton.

== Early life ==
Van Gool was born on 9 February 2004. Born in Leiden, Netherlands, she is a native of Sassenheim, Netherlands.

== Club career ==
As a youth player, van Gool joined the youth academy of Dutch side Ter Leede. Following her stint there, she started her career with Dutch side Ajax, where she made fifty-four league appearances and scored two goals and helped the club win the league title. Ahead of the 2025–26 season, she signed for English side Everton.

== International career ==
Van Gool is a Netherlands youth international. During the summer of 2022, she played for the Netherlands women's national under-20 football team at the 2022 FIFA U-20 Women's World Cup.

== Career statistics ==
As of match played 13 September 2026

Appearances and goals by club, season and competition
Club	Season	League			National cup (Note: Includes KNVB Women's Cup, Women's FA Cup)		League cup (Note: Includes Eredivisie Cup (women), Women's League Cup)		Continental (Note: Includes UEFA Women's Champions League)		Other		Total	
Club	Season	Division	Apps	Goals	Apps	Goals	Apps	Goals	Apps	Goals	Apps	Goals	Apps	Goals
Ajax	2021–22	Vrouwen Eredivisie	1	0	0	0	0	0	—		—		1	0
Ajax	2022–23	Vrouwen Eredivisie	14	0	0	0	3	1	—		—		17	1
Ajax	2023–24	Vrouwen Eredivisie	22	0	2	1	0	0	11	0	1 (Note: Appearance(s) in Dutch Women's Super Cup)	0	36	1
Ajax	2024–25	Vrouwen Eredivisie	18	2	1	0	0	0	—		—		19	2
Ajax	Total		55	2	3	1	3	1	11	0	1	0	73	4
Everton	2025–26	Women's Super League	19	0	2	0	3	0	—		—		24	0
Everton	2026–27	Women's Super League	2	0	0	0	0	0	—		—		2	0
Everton			21	0	2	0	3	0	0	0	0	0	26	0
Career total			76	2	5	1	6	1	11	0	1	0	99	4
