= Zara Kramžar =

Slovenian footballer (born 2006)

Personal information
- Date of birth: 10 January 2006 (age 20)
- Place of birth: Slovenia
- Position: Midfielder

Team information
- Current team: Everton
- Number: 21

Youth career
- ŽNK Ljubljana

Senior career*
Years	Team	Apps	(Gls)
2022	ŽNK Ljubljana	7	(12)
2022–2026	Roma	19	(3)
2024–2026	→ Como (loan)	29	(9)
2026	→ Everton (loan)	7	(1)
2026–	Everton	2	(0)

International career^{‡}
2022–2023	Slovenia U17	10	(2)
2022–	Slovenia	27	(10)
- * Club domestic league appearances and goals as of 06:40, 15 September 2026 (UTC) ‡ National team caps and goals as of 15:00, 19 May 2026 (UTC)

Zara Kramžar (born 10 January 2006) is a Slovenian professional footballer who plays as a midfielder for Women's Super League club Everton and the Slovenian national team.

== Club career ==
Kramžar started playing football at the age of five, featuring in the mixed-sex teams of a local grassroots club; in January 2022, she signed her first professional contract with Slovenian Women's League club ŽNK Ljubljana.

Having attracted interest from several European clubs following her performances with Ljubljana's first team, on 14 August 2022 Kramžar officially joined Serie A side Roma on a permanent deal, signing a two-year contract. She made her debut for the Italian club on 24 September, coming on as a substitute for Andressa Alves in the second half of a 2–1 league win over Fiorentina; in the process, she became the first 2006-born player to ever feature in the Italian top-flight. On 29 September, she made her UEFA Women's Champions League debut in a 4–1 victory over Sparta Prague in the second qualifying round. On 14 January 2023, she scored her first goal for Roma in a 7–1 league victory away at Fiorentina. During the 2022–23 season, the midfielder helped the Giallorosse win their first Serie A title, while also contributing to the under-19 team's fourth consecutive national title.

In May 2023, she extended her contract with the club until 2026. In November of the same year, she received the Trofeo Promesa as the best young international talent at the third European Women's Football Gala in Barcelona, hosted by Mundo Deportivo. Throughout the 2023–24 campaign, she contributed to the victory of a second consecutive league title, as well as the Coppa Italia.

On 14 August 2024, Kramžar joined fellow Serie A club Como on a season-long loan.

On 3 February 2026, Kramžar joined Women's Super League club Everton on loan until the end of the 2025–26 season, with the BBC reporting that the contract included an obligation-to-buy clause. On 14 July 2026, she was announced at Everton permanently after the loan agreement was activated.

== International career ==
Kramžar has represented Slovenia at under-17 level.

She won her first cap for the Slovenian senior national team on 12 November 2022, coming on as a second-half substitute in a friendly match against Kosovo: in the process, she scored on her debut, contributing to a 3–1 win for her side.

== Career statistics ==
=== Club ===
As of match played 13 September 2026

Appearances and goals by club, season and competition
Club	Season	League			National cup (Note: Includes Ženski Nogometni Pokal, Coppa Italia, Women's FA Cup)		League cup (Note: Includes Coppa Femminile di Serie A, Women's League Cup)		Continental		Total	
Club	Season	Division	Apps	Goals	Apps	Goals	Apps	Goals	Apps	Goals	Apps	Goals
ŽNK Ljubljana	2021–22	Ženska Nogometna Liga	7	12	2	2	—		—		9	14
AS Roma	2022–23	Serie A	12	2	3	2	—		3	0	18	4
AS Roma	2023–24	Serie A	7	1	2	1	—		3	0	9	2
AS Roma	Total		19	3	5	3	0	0	6	0	27	6
Como (loan)	2024–25	Serie A	19	6	0	0	—		—		19	6
Como (loan)	2025–26	Serie A	10	3	0	0	2	0	—		12	3
Como (loan)	Total		29	9	0	0	2	0	0	0	31	9
Everton (loan)	2025–26	Women's Super League	7	1	1	0	0	0	—		8	1
Everton	2026–27	Women's Super League	2	0	0	0	0	0	—		2	0
Career total			64	25	8	5	2	0	6	0	80	30

=== International ===
As of match played 18 April 2026

Appearances and goals by national team and year
National team	Year	Apps	Goals
Slovenia	2022	1	1
Slovenia	2023	6	1
Slovenia	2024	6	1
Slovenia	2025	10	6
Slovenia	2026	4	1
Total		27	10

Scores and results list Slovenia's goal tally first, score column indicates score after each Kramžar goal.

List of international goals scored by Zara Kramžar
No.	Date	Venue	Opponent	Score	Result	Competition
1	12 November 2022	Bonifika Stadium, Koper, Slovenia	Kosovo	3–1	3–1	Friendly
2	12 April 2023	Den Dreef, Leuven, Belgium	Belgium	2–2	2–2	Friendly
3	12 July 2024	Zimbru Stadium, Chișinău, Moldova	Moldova	4–0	5–0	UEFA Women's Euro 2025 Qualifiers
4	21 February 2025	Theodoros Vardinogiannis Stadium, Heraklion, Greece	Greece	2–1	2–1	UEFA Women's Nations League
5	25 February 2025	Bonifika Stadium, Koper, Slovenia	Republic of Ireland	3–0	4–0	UEFA Women's Nations League
6	4 April 2025	Šiška Sports Park, Ljubljana, Slovenia	Turkey	2–0	3–0	UEFA Women's Nations League
7	8 April 2025	New Sivas 4 Eylül Stadium, Sivas, Turkey	Turkey	1–0	1–0	UEFA Women's Nations League
8	30 May 2025	Šiška Sports Park, Ljubljana, Slovenia	Greece	1–0	2–0	UEFA Women's Nations League
9	27 October 2025	Domžale Sports Park, Domžale, Slovenia	Serbia	1–0	2–4	Friendly
10	7 March 2026	Bonifika Stadium, Koper, Slovenia	Austria	1–0	1–0	2027 FIFA Women's World Cup Qualifiers

== Honours ==
Roma

- Serie A: 2022–23, 2023–24
- Coppa Italia: 2023–24

Roma U19

- Campionato Primavera Femminile: 2022–23

Individual

- Trofeo Promesa: 2023
