= Rion Ishikawa =

Japanese footballer (born 2003)

Rion Ishikawa 石川 璃音
Personal information
- Date of birth: 4 July 2003 (age 23)
- Place of birth: Akita, Akita Prefecture, Japan
- Height: 1.72 m (5 ft 8 in)
- Position: Centre-back

Team information
- Current team: Everton
- Number: 3

Youth career
- 2016–2022: JFA Academy Fukushima

Senior career*
Years	Team	Apps	(Gls)
2022–2025	Urawa Red Diamonds Ladies	61	(1)
2025–	Everton	11	(0)

International career^{‡}
2022	Japan U20	6	(0)
2023–	Japan	15	(0)
- * Club domestic league appearances and goals as of 05:00, 15 September 2026 (UTC) ‡ National team caps and goals as of 14:01, 22 December 2025 (UTC)

Rion Ishikawa (石川 璃音, Ishikawa Rion; Japanese: [iɕikawa ɾi.oɴ]; born 4 July 2003) is a Japanese professional footballer who plays as a centre-back for Women's Super League club Everton and the Japan national team. Prior to her time at Everton, Ishikawa played for Mitsubishi Heavy Industries Urawa Reds Ladies

== Club career ==
On 6 July 2025, it was announced that Ishikawa had signed with Everton.

== International career ==
In July 2022, Ishikawa was selected for the Japan U-20 national team for the 2022 U-20 World Cup where Japan were the runners-up.

On 13 June 2023, she was included in Japan's 23-player squad for the FIFA Women's World Cup 2023.

On 14 June 2024, Ishikawa was included in the Japan squad for the 2024 Summer Olympics.

Ishikawa was part of the Japan squad that won the 2025 SheBelieves Cup.

== Career statistics ==
=== Club ===
As of match played 13 September 2026

Appearances and goals by club, season and competition
Club	Season	League			National cup (Note: Includes Empress's Cup, Women's FA Cup)		League cup (Note: Includes WE League Cup, Women's League Cup)		Continental (Note: Includes AFC Women's Club Championship/AFC Women's Champions League)		Total	
Club	Season	Division	Apps	Goals	Apps	Goals	Apps	Goals	Apps	Goals	Apps	Goals
Urawa Red	2022–23	WE League	20	1	2	0	2	1	—		24	2
Urawa Red	2023–24	WE League	20	0	4	0	4	0	1	0	29	0
Urawa Red	2024–25	WE League	21	0	4	0	1	0	3	0	29	0
Urawa Red	Total		61	1	10	0	7	1	4	0	82	2
Everton	2025–26	Women's Super League	9	0	0	0	2	0	—		11	0
Everton	2026–27	Women's Super League	2	0	0	0	0	0	—		2	0
Everton	Total		11	0	0	0	2	0	0	0	13	0
Career total			72	1	10	0	9	1	4	0	95	2

=== International ===
As of match played 2 December 2025

Appearances and goals by national team and year
National Team	Year	Apps	Goals
Japan	2023	6	0
Japan	2024	3	0
Japan	2025	6	0
Total		15	0

== Honours ==
Mitsubishi Heavy Industries Urawa Reds Ladies

- WE League: 2022–23
- WE League Cup: 2022–23
- AFC Women's Club Championship: 2023

Individual

- WE League Best XI: 2022–23
