= Hikaru Kitagawa =

Japanese footballer (born 1997)

Hikaru Kitagawa 北川 ひかる
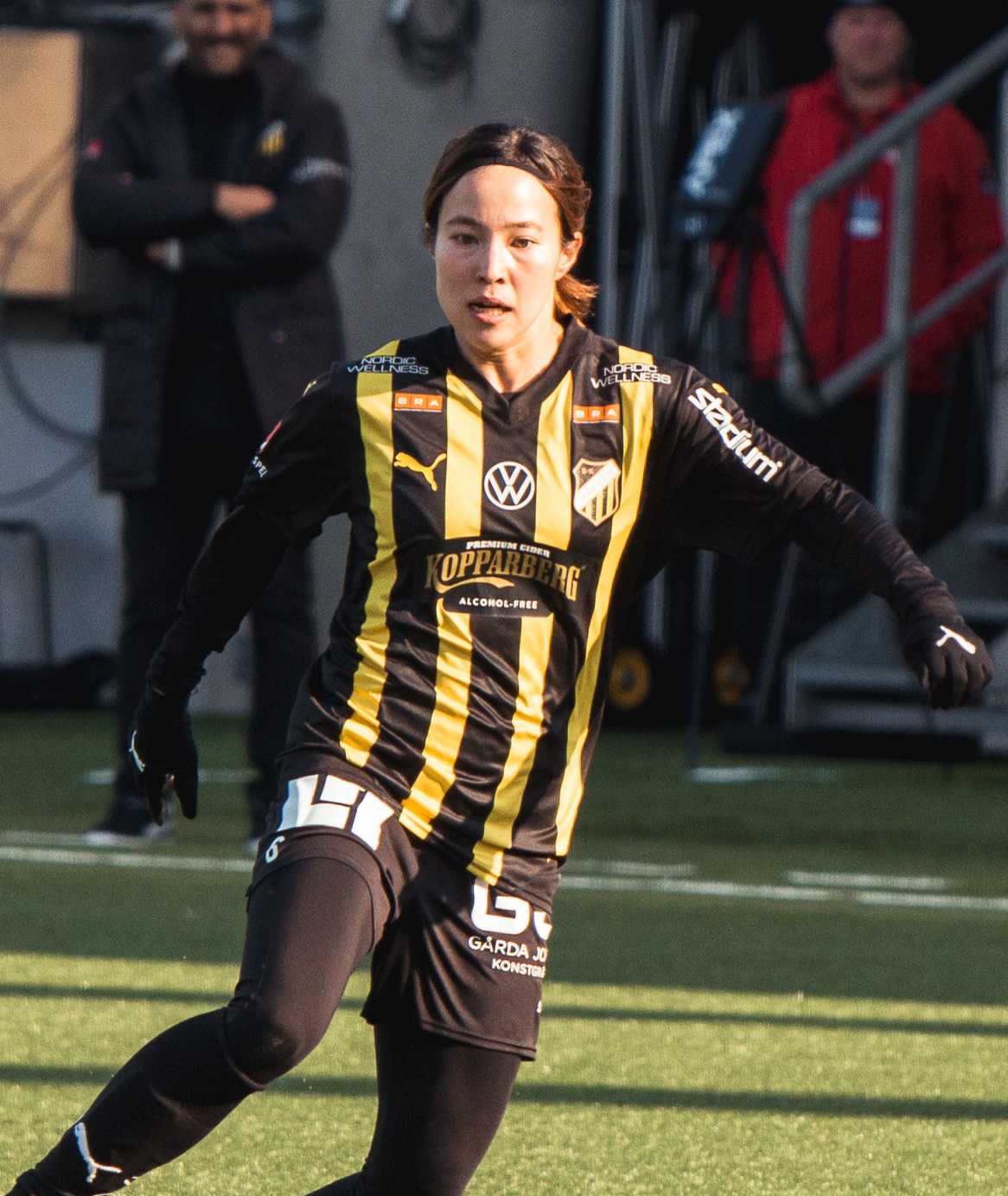
- Kitagawa with BK Häcken in 2025

Personal information
- Full name: Hikaru Kitagawa
- Date of birth: May 10, 1997 (age 29)
- Place of birth: Kanazawa, Ishikawa, Japan
- Height: 1.64 m (5 ft 5 in)
- Position: Defender

Team information
- Current team: Everton
- Number: 13

Youth career
- 2010–2015: JFA Academy Fukushima

Senior career*
Years	Team	Apps	(Gls)
2015–2018	Urawa Reds	43	(4)
2018–2023	Albirex Niigata	76	(3)
2023–2024	INAC Kobe Leonessa	22	(6)
2024–2025	BK Häcken	17	(2)
2025–	Everton	17	(1)

International career^{‡}
2014	Japan U-17	5	(0)
2016	Japan U-20	6	(0)
2017–	Japan	31	(2)
Medal record
Women's football
Representing Japan
AFC Women's Asian Cup
Winner	2026 Australia
FIFA U-20 Women's World Cup
Bronze medal – third place	2016 Papua New Guinea
AFC U-19 Women's Championship
Winner	2015 China
FIFA U-17 Women's World Cup
Winner	2014 Costa Rica
AFC U-16 Women's Championship
Winner	2013 China
- * Club domestic league appearances and goals as of 04:59, 15 September 2026 (UTC) ‡ National team caps and goals as of 07:26, 20 April 2026 (UTC)

Hikaru Kitagawa (北川 ひかる, Kitagawa Hikaru; Japanese: [kitaɡawa hikaɾɯ]; born May 10, 1997) is a Japanese professional footballer who plays as a defender for Women's Super League club Everton and the Japan national team.

== Club career ==
Kitagawa was born in Kanazawa on May 10, 1997. After graduating from JFA Academy Fukushima, she joined Urawa Reds in 2015. She played as regular right side back from first season. However her opportunity to play decreased from 2017. In September 2018, she moved to Albirex Niigata.

On 19 August 2024, Kitagawa was announced at BK Häcken, becoming the first Japanese player to play for the club.

In July 2025, Kitagawa signed for Women's Super League club Everton. On her debut for the club, she scored against Manchester City in the 82nd minute on 24 September 2025.

== International career ==
Kitagawa played for Japan U-17 national team at 2014 U-17 World Cup and Japan U-20 national team at 2016 U-20 World Cup. Japan won the championship in 2014 and took third place in 2016. In 2017, she was selected by the Japan national team for the 2017 Algarve Cup. On March 1, she played against Spain. She played five games for Japan in 2017.

On 14 June 2024, Kitagawa was included in the Japan squad for the 2024 Summer Olympics.

Kitagawa was part of the Japan squad that won the 2025 SheBelieves Cup.

== Career statistics ==
=== Club ===
As of match played 13 September 2026

Appearances and goals by club, season and competition
Club	Season	League			National cup (Note: Includes Empress's Cup, Svenska Cupen)		League cup (Note: Includes Nadeshiko League Cup, WE League Cup)		Continental		Total	
Club	Season	Division	Apps	Goals	Apps	Goals	Apps	Goals	Apps	Goals	Apps	Goals
Urawa Reds	2015	Nadeshiko League	12	0	0	0	0	0	—		12	0
Urawa Reds	2016	Nadeshiko League	17	3	1	0	8	2	—		26	5
Urawa Reds	2017	Nadeshiko League	6	1	4	0	6	0	—		16	1
Urawa Reds	2018	Nadeshiko League	8	0	0	0	3	0	—		11	0
Urawa Reds	Total		43	4	5	0	17	2	0	0	65	6
Albirex Niigata	2018	Nadeshiko League	7	1	0	0	0	0	—		7	1
Albirex Niigata	2019	Nadeshiko League	13	0	2	1	5	0	—		20	1
Albirex Niigata	2020	Nadeshiko League	18	1	0	0	0	0	—		18	1
Albirex Niigata	2021–22	WE League	20	1	—		2	0	—		22	1
Albirex Niigata	2022–23	WE League	18	0	3	0	5	0	—		26	0
Albirex Niigata	Total		76	3	5	1	12	0	0	0	93	4
INAC Kobe Leonessa	2023–24	WE League	22	6	4	2	5	0	—		31	8
BK Häcken	2024	Damallsvenskan	7	1	5	2	—		2 (Note: Appearance(s) in UEFA Women's Champions League)	0	14	3
BK Häcken	2025	Damallsvenskan	10	1	—		—		—		10	1
BK Häcken	Total		17	2	5	2	0	0	2	0	24	4
Everton	2025–26	Women's Super League	15	1	2	0	3	1	—		20	2
Everton	2026–27	Women's Super League	2	0	0	0	0	0	—		2	0
Everton	Total		17	1	2	0	3	1	0	0	22	2
Career total			175	16	21	5	27	3	2	0	244	24

=== International ===
As of match played 18 April 2026

Appearances and goals by national team and year
National team	Year	Apps	Goals
Japan	2017	5	0
Japan	2022	1	0
Japan	2024	8	2
Japan	2025	9	0
Japan	2026	8	0
Total		31	2

Scores and results list Japan's goal tally first, score column indicates score after each Kitagawa goal.

List of international goals scored by Hikaru Kitagawa
No.	Date	Venue	Opponent	Score	Result	Competition
1	31 July 2024	Stade de la Beaujoire, Nantes, France	Nigeria	3–1	3–1	2024 Summer Olympics
2	26 October 2024	Japan National Stadium, Tokyo, Japan	South Korea	1–0	4–0	Friendly

== Honours ==
INAC Kobe Leonessa

- Empress's Cup: 2023

U17 Japan

- AFC U-16 Women's Championship: 2013
- FIFA U-17 Women's World Cup: 2014

Japan U20

- AFC U-19 Women's Championship: 2015

Japan

- AFC Women's Asian Cup: 2026
- EAFF E-1 Football Championship: 2022
- SheBelieves Cup: 2025
