= Karina Vignola =

Uruguayan actress (born 1976)

- Born: 7 May 1976 (age 50); Montevideo, Uruguay
- Occupation: Television presenter
- Spouse: Gaspar Valverde (m. 2011; div. 2024)
- Children: 2

Karina Vignola Campos (born 7 May 1976) is a Uruguayan television presenter and actress, recognized for her work in media such as Canal 4, Canal 10 and Fox Sports, among others. She has been nominated twice for the Iris Award in the category of best presenter in 2014 and 2017.

== Biography ==
Vignola was born on in Montevideo on 7 May 1976. She studied at the Escuela Experimental de Malvín, Colegio Kennedy and Colegio Lourdes.

She began her career on Uruguayan television in the late 1990s on the program Igual a igual with journalist Omar Gutiérrez. After a stint at La hora de los Deportes on Canal 5, she moved to Argentina in order to go to Fox Sports, where she worked as a sports communicator and participated in programs such as Fútbol para todos. She returned to her native country to join Canal 4, where she presented some variety programs such as Terapia de Pareja, Ojo al piojo and A cara pintada. In the mid-2010s, she worked with Canal 10 presenting some television shows such as Consentidas, one of the longest-running general interest programs on Uruguayan television. During the decade, she also participated in various plays and comedy specials.

In February 2021, Vignola announced her departure from Canal 10. Currently, she is dedicated to producing audiovisual content through her social networks.

== Personal life ==
Vignola married Gaspar Valverde in 2011. They have two daughters, Luana and Alina Valverde. In January 2024 they divorced.
