= Honoka Hayashi =

Japanese footballer (born 1998)

Honoka Hayashi 林 穂之香
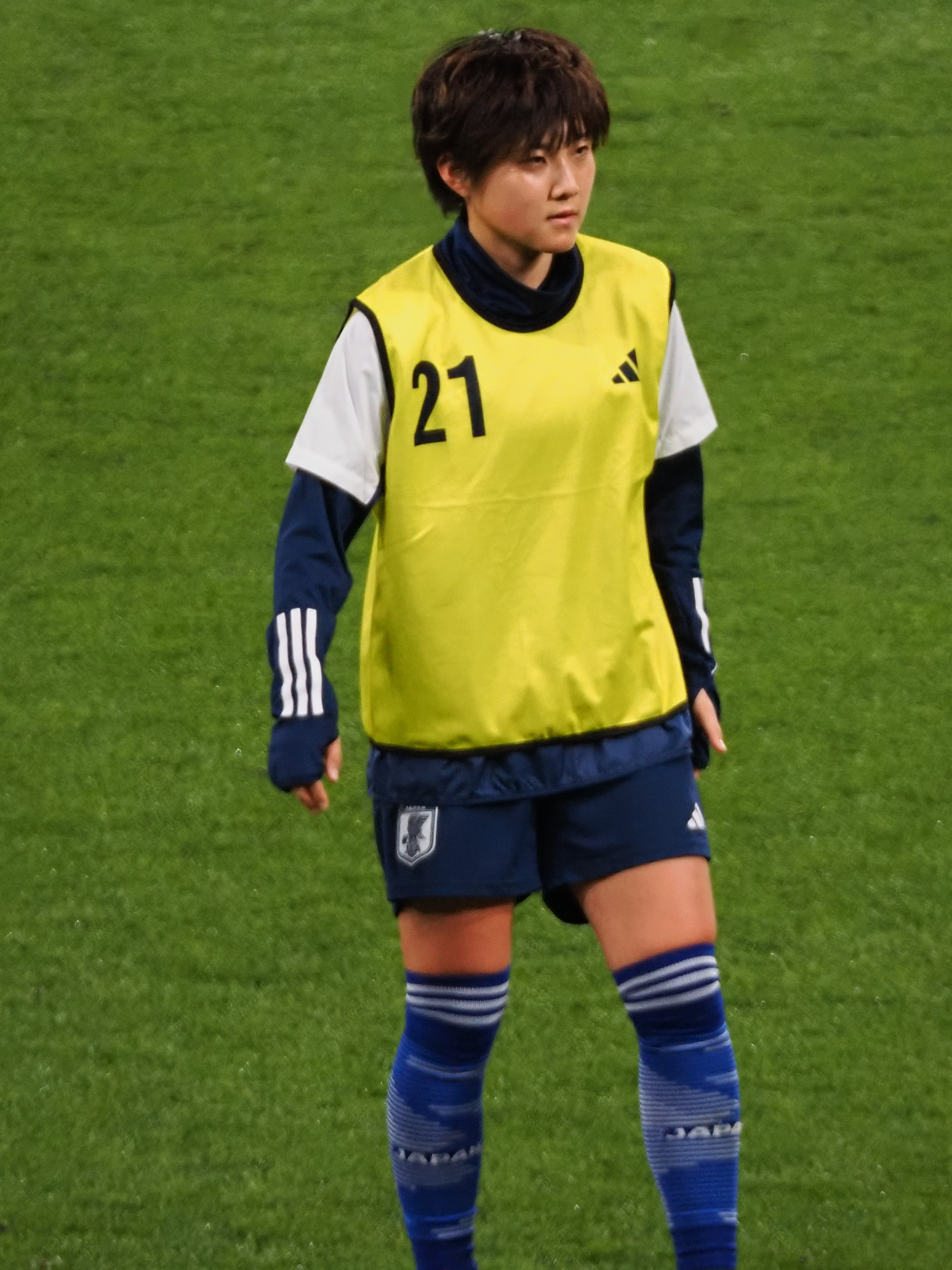

Personal information
- Full name: Honoka Hayashi
- Date of birth: 19 May 1998 (age 28)
- Place of birth: Uji, Kyoto, Japan
- Height: 1.57 m (5 ft 2 in)
- Position: Midfielder

Team information
- Current team: Everton
- Number: 6

Senior career*
Years	Team	Apps	(Gls)
2013–2020	Cerezo Osaka	150	(36)
2021–2022	AIK	36	(6)
2022–2024	West Ham United	42	(3)
2024–	Everton	42	(8)

International career^{‡}
2017	Japan U19	3	(1)
2016–2018	Japan U20	8	(2)
2019–	Japan	42	(2)
Medal record
Women's football
Representing Japan
AFC Women's Asian Cup
Winner	2026 Australia
FIFA U-20 Women's World Cup
Winner	2018 France
- * Club domestic league appearances and goals as of 06:28, 15 September 2026 (UTC) ‡ National team caps and goals as of 07:36, 20 April 2026 (UTC)

Honoka Hayashi (林 穂之香, Hayashi Honoka; IPA: [hajaɕiꜜ honoka]; born 19 May 1998) is a Japanese professional footballer who plays as a midfielder for Women's Super League club Everton and the Japan national team.

A full international since 2019, she represented Japan at the 2020 Olympics and the 2023 FIFA World Cup.

== Early life ==
Hayashi was born in Uji, just south of central Kyoto in Japan. She started playing football for Shinmei JSC Sports Boy Scouts at the age of five. As an eleven-year-old, she was invited to a national team camp for U12 players by the Japan Football Association. At the age of 15, Hayashi moved to Osaka and she started playing with Cerezo Osaka's U15 team.

== Club career ==
=== Cerezo Osaka Sakai ===
Hayashi begun her career with Cerezo Osaka Sakai in 2013 as they entered the second division Challenge League. She was appointed club captain in 2017 and led her club to promotion to the Nadeshiko League Division 1 by the end of the season and won the Division 2 Nadeshiko League Cup.

=== AIK Fotboll ===
On 16 December 2020, Hayashi signed a contract with Swedish Damallsvenskan side AIK Fotboll. She made her friendly debut in their pre-season tournament Stockholm Volkswagen Challenge. Hayashi made her league debut against Växjö on 17 April 2021. On 2 May 2021, she scored her first competitive goals for the club against Djurgårdens IF, scoring in the 57th, and scoring a penalty in the 79th minute. On June 5, 2021, she netted a freekick goal against KIF Örebro that would see her nominated for goal of the year by Sportbladet. In total, she made 36 appearances for the club and netted 7 goals.

=== West Ham United ===
On 8 September 2022, Hayashi signed a two-year-contract with West Ham United for an undisclosed fee from Swedish Damallsvenskan side AIK Fotboll. She made her league debut against Everton on 18 September 2022. She scored her first goal for the club in a 2-1 win against Aston Villa on 15 October 2022. On 30 June 2024, it was announced that Hayashi would leave the club when her contract expired.

=== Everton ===
On 24 July 2024, Hayashi signed for Everton. On 7 December 2025, she scored the goal that ended Chelsea's unbeaten streak, the longest in Super League history at 34 matches, with Everton winning 1–0. On 6 February 2026, Hayashi signed a one and a half year contract extension with the club, with a club option of a further year.

== International career ==
Hayashi received her first international call-up in December 2019. On 13 June 2023, she was included in the 23-player squad for the FIFA World Cup 2023. She scored her first international goal in Japan's 2–1 win against Sweden in the quarterfinal. On 14 June 2024, she was included in the 2024 Summer Olympics squad.

Hayashi was part of the Japan squad that won the 2025 SheBelieves Cup.

== Career statistics ==
=== Club ===
As of match played 13 September 2026

Appearances and goals by club, season and competition
Club	Season	League			National Cup (Note: Includes Empress's Cup, Svenska Cupen Damer, Women's FA Cup)		League Cup (Note: Includes Nadeshiko League Cup, FA Women's League Cup)		Total	
Club	Season	Division	Apps	Goals	Apps	Goals	Apps	Goals	Apps	Goals
Cerezo Osaka Sakai	2013	Nadeshiko Challenge League	22	4	1	0	—		23	4
Cerezo Osaka Sakai	2014	Nadeshiko Challenge League	22	3	—		—		22	3
Cerezo Osaka Sakai	2015	Nadeshiko Challenge League	18	8	—		—		18	8
Cerezo Osaka Sakai	2016	Nadeshiko League 2	18	3	2	0	8	2	28	5
Cerezo Osaka Sakai	2017	Nadeshiko League 2	18	6	2	0	9	2	29	8
Cerezo Osaka Sakai	2018	Nadeshiko League	16	1	2	0	8	0	26	1
Cerezo Osaka Sakai	2019	Nadeshiko League 2	18	4	2	0	9	4	29	8
Cerezo Osaka Sakai	2020	Nadeshiko League	18	7	3	1	—		21	8
Cerezo Osaka Sakai	Total		148	36	12	1	34	8	196	45
AIK Fotboll	2021	Damallsvenskan	18	4	0	0	—		18	4
AIK Fotboll	2022	Damallsvenskan	18	2	0	0	—		18	2
AIK Fotboll	Total		36	6	0	0	0	0	36	6
West Ham United	2022–23	Women's Super League	21	1	1	0	5	0	27	1
West Ham United	2023–24	Women's Super League	21	2	1	0	1	0	23	2
West Ham United	Total		42	3	2	0	6	0	50	3
Everton	2024–25	Women's Super League	21	4	2	0	2	0	25	4
Everton	2025–26	Women's Super League	19	4	1	0	3	0	23	4
Everton	2026–27	Women's Super League	2	0	0	0	0	0	2	0
Everton	Total		42	8	3	0	5	0	50	8
Career total			268	53	17	1	45	8	332	62

=== International ===
As of match played 18 April 2026

Appearances and goals by national team and year
National Team	Year	Apps	Goals
Japan	2019	1	0
Japan	2021	9	0
Japan	2022	9	0
Japan	2023	11	2
Japan	2024	5	0
Japan	2025	2	0
Japan	2023	5	0
Total		42	2

Scores and results list Japan's goal tally first, score column indicates score after each Hayashi goal.

List of international goals scored by Honoka Hayashi
No.	Date	Venue	Opponent	Score	Result	Competition	Ref.
1	11 August 2023	Eden Park, Auckland, New Zealand	Sweden	1–2	1–2	2023 FIFA Women's World Cup	
2	26 October 2023	Lokomotiv Stadium, Tashkent, Uzbekistan	India	3–0	7–0	2024 AFC Women's Olympic Qualifying Tournament	

== Honours ==
Cerezo Osaka Sakai

- Nadeshiko League Cup Division 2: 2017, 2019

Japan U20

- FIFA U-20 Women's World Cup: 2018

Japan

- AFC Women's Asian Cup: 2026
- EAFF E-1 Football Championship: 2019, 2022
