= Scott Phelan =

English footballer

Personal information
- Date of birth: 13 March 1988 (age 38)
- Place of birth: Liverpool, England
- Position: Midfielder

Team information
- Current team: Everton Women (head coach)

Youth career
- Everton

Senior career*
Years	Team	Apps	(Gls)
2007–2008	Bradford City	13	(0)
2008–2011	FC Halifax Town	100	(13)
2011–2012	Kidderminster Harriers	15	(1)
2011–2012	→ Vauxhall Motors (loan)	2	(0)
2012	Vauxhall Motors	2	(0)
2012	Altrincham	11	(2)
Total		143	(16)

International career
2003–2004	England U16	5	(0)
2004–2005	England U17	6	(0)
2006	England U18	1	(0)

Managerial career
- 2026: Everton Women (interim)
- 2026–: Everton Women
- * Club domestic league appearances and goals

Scott Phelan (born 13 March 1988) is an English football coach and former professional player who is the head coach of Women's Super League side Everton Women.

== Playing career ==
Born in Liverpool, Phelan was a trainee at Everton, captaining the under 18 and reserve sides, until he was released in 2007 without making a senior appearance. He was handed a trial at Bradford City, after which he was handed a one-year contract to become the third young midfielder to join League Two side Bradford City from the Toffees in recent years, following Tom Kearney and Steven Schumacher. He made his league debut when he came on as a late substitute in Bradford's 2–1 victory over Wrexham on 25 August 2007. He played 15 games for Bradford, 12 of which have been in the league, but the last came in December 2007, before he was one of 13 players to be released on 29 April 2008. He played one more game in the club's final game of the season, four days later, as City lost 2–1 to Wycombe Wanderers, bringing his total number of appearances for the club to 16.

After four months without a club, Phelan joined Northern Premier League Division One North-side FC Halifax Town in September 2008. Phelan was handed his Halifax debut a day later in a 7–1 victory over Salford City as a second-half substitute, a role he had for the next three games.

In May 2011 he signed for Kidderminster Harriers after the expiry of his contract with Halifax.

He joined Vauxhall Motors on loan in December 2011. He was released by Kidderminster Harriers in February 2012, joining Vauxhall Motors for two weeks, before joining Altrincham. He quit playing in August 2012 to become a full-time coach at Everton.

== Managerial career ==
On 4 February 2026, it was announced that Phelan had been appointed as the interim head coach of Women's Super League side Everton for the remainder of the 2025-26 season, replacing Brian Sørensen. Speaking about the switch to managing in the women's game, he said "People have told me that that the women's team is very important – it's not just a recent thing with the growth of the game and how the profile has improved – the presence of the women's team at Everton has been here for a long time." His first match as head coach was a 1–0 win over London City Lionesses on 8 February 2026. Following Everton's 1–0 win against West Ham United on 15 February 2026, Phelan became the first head coach in the club's history to lead Everton to two successive victories in the WSL.

On 23 June 2026, the position was made permanent.

== Managerial statistics ==
As of match played 25 October 2026

Managerial record by team and tenure
Team	From	To	Record					Ref.
Team	From	To	P	W	D	L	Win %	Ref.
Everton Women	4 February 2026	present	18	9	0	9	50.0	
Total			18	9	0	9	50.0	
