= Everton F.C. Women =

Association football club in England

Everton
- Full name: Everton Football Club
- Nicknames: The Blues; The Toffees
- Founded: 1983; 43 years ago
- Ground: Goodison Park; Hill Dickinson Stadium
- Capacity: 39,414
- Coordinates: 53°26′20″N 2°57′58″W
- Manager: Scott Phelan
- League: Women's Super League
- 2025–26: WSL, 8th of 12
- Website: evertonfc.com/women
| Home colours | Away colours | Third colours |

Everton Football Club (/ˈɛvərtən/) is an English women's association football team based in Liverpool, England, that competes in the FA Women's Super League, the top division of English women's football. Formed in 1983 as Hoylake W.F.C., it is now part of Everton and has played home games at Walton Hall Park in Walton since February 2020. As of 2025, they play at Goodison Park, the former home of the Men's Team. The team has won the Premier League National Division once, the Premier League Cup once, and the Women's FA Cup twice.

== History ==
=== Early years ===
The club started as Hoylake WFC in 1983. It merged with Dolphins YC to become Leasowe, then added Pacific to its title in a sponsorship deal. In 1987–88, the team came to prominence by winning the North West Women's League and reaching the 1988 Women's FA Cup final, losing to Doncaster Belles 3–1. They came back the following year to beat Friends of Fulham 3–2. By 1991–92, Leasowe Pacific had won its regional league for five years running, and when the regular national competition was expanded the next season, it was admitted to Division One North, promptly finishing first to join the FA Women's Premier League.

=== Becoming Everton ===
In 1995, the club became known as Everton Ladies and continued to make its mark. In 1997, it reached the final of the Premier League Cup, but lost to Millwall Lionesses 1–2. The next year, however, the club was crowned National Premier League Champions, its biggest success to date. In 1999, the club lost in the League Cup final, 1–3 to Arsenal Ladies, and in 2005, reached the FA Women's Cup final only to lose 0–1 to Charlton Athletic after a disappointing performance. Revenge of sorts came two years later when Everton pipped Charlton to second place in the Premier League which, as champions Arsenal had already won the UEFA Women's Cup, meant a European debut for Everton in 2007–08. In 2008, it won the Premier League Cup by beating Arsenal in the final. Arsenal was unbeaten in England for two years at the time.

The club's first foray into UEFA competition saw it win its opening game 4–0 against Lithuanian side Gintra. It won further group games against Glentoran and Zulwil without conceding and scoring 20 goals in the process. The campaign was to end in disappointment at the second group stage. Despite beating Valur 3–1 in its final group game, Everton only finished third and failed to progress into the quarter–finals amidst much controversy.

On 10 May 2009, Everton only needed a draw against Arsenal Ladies in the last match of the season to win the Women's Premier League for the second time in its history, but lost 1–0 to finish runners–up on goal difference. Due to the reformatting of the European Cup into the UEFA Women's Champions League, however, the team still qualified for Europe, although it had to enter at the qualifying group stages and was eliminated in the round of 32 by Norwegian team Roa IL. In 2010, Everton beat Arsenal 3–2 to win the FA Women's Cup with Natasha Dowie (niece of Iain) scoring the winner deep into extra time.

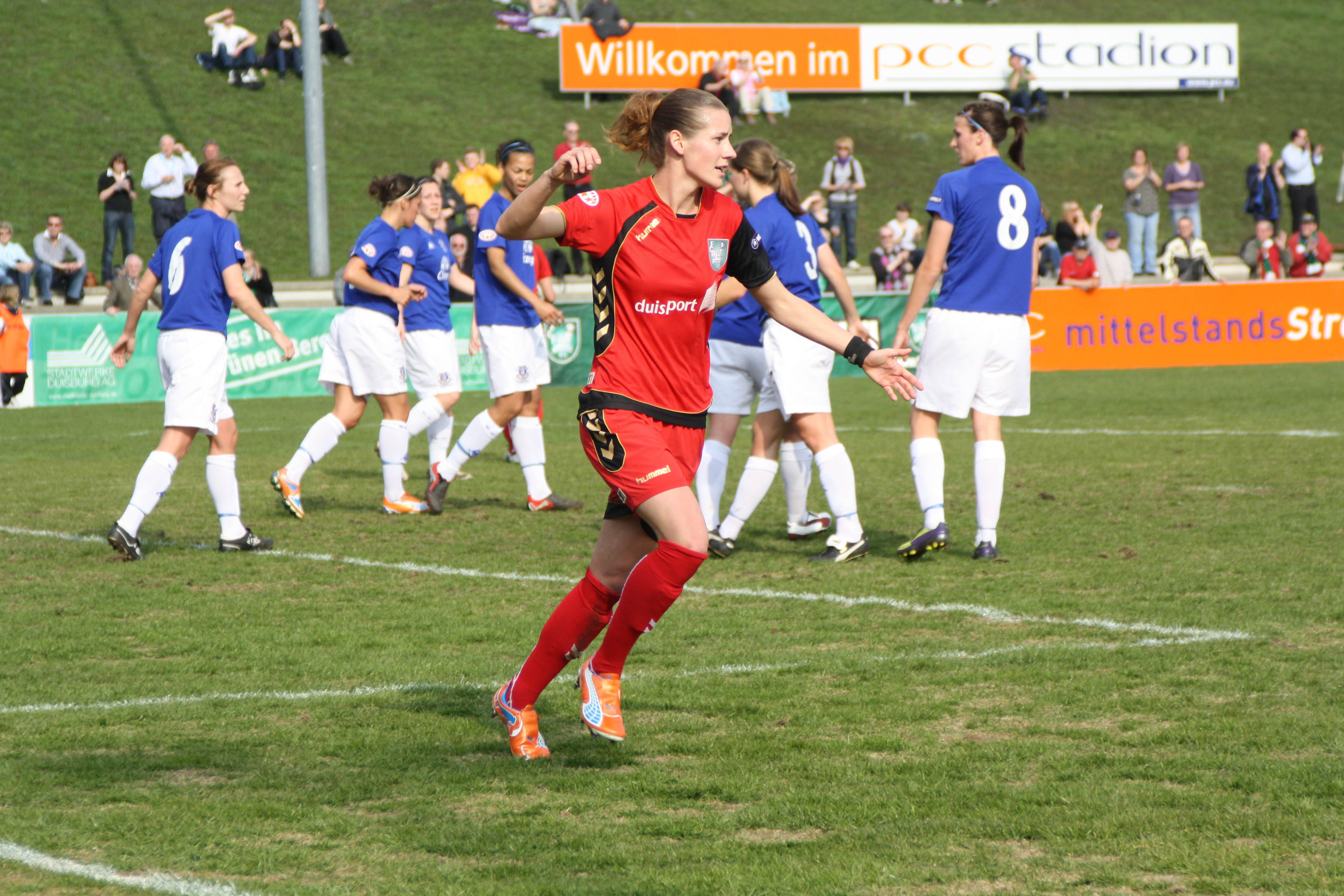
Laudehr of Duisburg scores against Everton in the Champions League 2010–11

In 2011, the club advanced to the quarter–finals of the Champions League, where its best run so far was stopped by German side FCR Duisburg. Everton was one of eight founding teams in the FA WSL in March 2011.

=== Relegation to FA WSL 2 in 2014 ===
After several seasons finishing mid-table, Everton would struggle to gain form during the 2014 season. The club lost key players Jill Scott and Toni Duggan to Manchester City during the off-season. In September 2014, Everton would lose 2–0 to Notts County, sealing its relegation to WSL 2 after 21 years of top flight football.

The 2014 FA Women's Cup final was the 44th final of the FA Women's Cup, England's primary cup competition for women's football teams. The showpiece event was the 21st to be played directly under the auspices of the Football Association (FA). The final was contested between Arsenal and Everton on 1 June 2014 at Stadium:MK in Milton Keynes. This was the last cup final held outside Wembley Stadium. Holders Arsenal made its 14th final appearance, after winning the 2013 final. Everton was appearing in its fifth final.

As FA WSL 1 clubs, both teams entered the competition at the fifth round stage. Arsenal beat Gillingham (2–0), Birmingham City (2–1) and Chelsea (5–3) to reach the final. Everton defeated Cardiff City (3–1), Liverpool (2–0) and Notts County (2–1).

The victory gave Arsenal a rare FA Cup double with the men's team winning the final two weeks before, a feat they accomplished for the third time (also in 1993 and 1998).

=== FA WSL 2 (2015–2017) ===
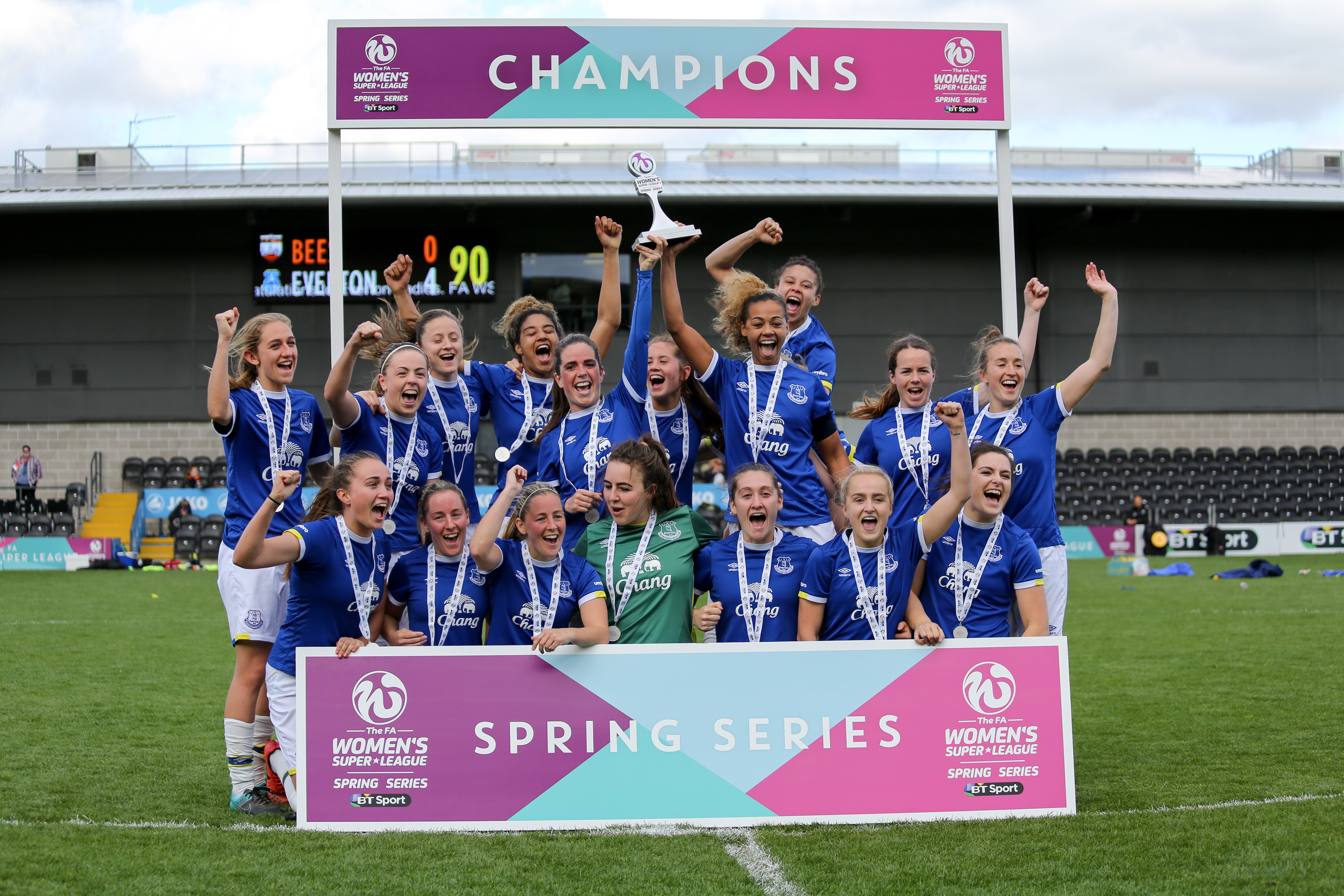
Everton celebrate winning the FA WSL 2 Spring Series in 2017

Everton would contend in WSL2, registering back-to-back third-place finishes during the 2015 and 2016 seasons. In anticipation of re-aligning the season with the typical FIFA calendar, the WSL 1 and 2 competed in a truncated 9-match season. The "FA WSL Spring Series" would not have teams compete for promotion or relegation before the full 2017–18 season. Everton won the Spring Series, recording 7 wins from 9 with scoring led by Claudia Walker (7 goals) and Simone Magill (5 goals). The Spring Series title was the first since the FA Women's Premier League National Division 1997–98 season title.

=== Return to top flight ===
Prior to the 2017–18 season, Notts County of the WSL 1 folded before the Spring Series, prompting the FA to invite FA WSL 2 clubs to apply and fill the vacancy. Everton was awarded the invitation back into the top flight on 9 June 2017, and would compete in the WSL 1 for the 2017–18 season.

Everton struggled to gain much form during the 2017–18 season. Despite making a run to the semi-finals in the 2017–18 FA Women's Cup, Everton finished 9th in the table (only beating out winless Yeovil Town). However, league structural changes prevented the club from being relegated.

Ahead of the 2019–20 season, the team dropped Ladies from its name. Although now simply called Everton, the club will use Everton Women in a formal capacity when necessary to avoid confusion with the men's team.

Everton reached the delayed 2019–20 FA Women's Cup final, losing to Manchester City 1–3 after extra-time at Wembley on 1 November 2020.

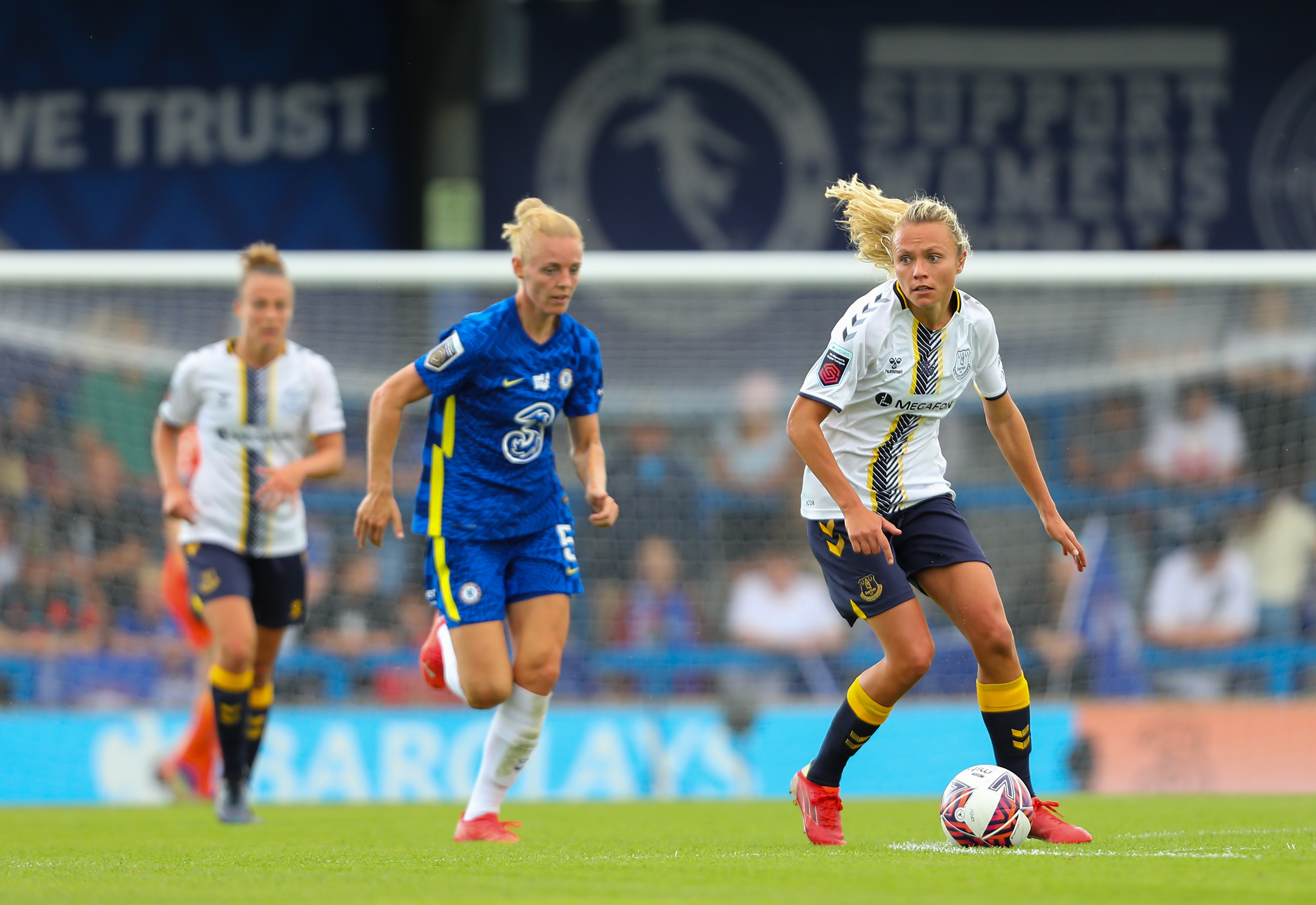
Everton playing Chelsea in September 2021

In the 2022–23 season, Everton finished sixth in the Women's Super League table while they ended the 2023–24 campaign in eighth.

The 2024–25 season saw Everton beat Manchester City for the first time ever in December 2024. The match ended 2–1 after two first half goals by Everton.

== Stadium ==
Everton had Rossett Park as its home ground starting in 1998, sharing with non-league side Marine in Crosby. Rossett Park would be the Blues' home ground for 15 years.

In 2013, the team moved to Halton Stadium (previously known then as "Select Security Stadium"), also used by its Merseyside rivals Liverpool. The move was prompted by needing improved technical requirements for the developing WSL standards and providing increased capacity.

Ahead of the 2018–19 season, Everton announced that they would play the first half of the season at Haig Avenue and ended up staying for the whole season.

In 2019, it was announced that the club would play its last game at the Haig Avenue on 29 September, before moving to Walton Hall Park, but delays meant the team would not move until February 2020.

In May 2025, it was announced that the club would move permanently to Goodison Park after the men's team move out at the end of the 2024–25 season. The first home league tie contested there was a match versus Tottenham Hotspur Women on 14 September 2025.

== Current squad ==
As of 13 August 2026

Note: Flags indicate national team as defined under FIFA eligibility rules; some limited exceptions apply. Players may hold more than one non-FIFA nationality.

| No. | Pos. | Nation | Player |
|---|---|---|---|
| 1 | GK | IRL | Courtney Brosnan |
| 2 | DF | ENG | Hannah Blundell |
| 3 | DF | JPN | Rion Ishikawa |
| 4 | DF | ENG | Issy Hobson |
| 5 | DF | ENG | Naomi Layzell (on loan from Manchester City) |
| 6 | MF | JPN | Honoka Hayashi |
| 7 | MF | AUS | Clare Wheeler |
| 8 | MF | NED | Rosa van Gool |
| 9 | FW | AUS | Holly McNamara |
| 10 | FW | ESP | Inma Gabarro |
| 11 | FW | WAL | Hannah Cain |
| 13 | DF | JPN | Hikaru Kitagawa |
| 15 | FW | FIN | Jutta Rantala |

| No. | Pos. | Nation | Player |
|---|---|---|---|
| 17 | FW | FRA | Noémie Mouchon |
| 18 | MF | ESP | Ornella Vignola |
| 20 | DF | ENG | Megan Finnigan (captain) |
| 21 | MF | SLO | Zara Kramžar |
| 22 | MF | ITA | Aurora Galli |
| 24 | GK | CAN | Rylee Foster-Inman |
| 25 | DF | ENG | Hannah Silcock |
| 28 | MF | DEN | Karen Holmgaard |
| 29 | MF | JPN | Yūka Momiki |
| 30 | MF | ENG | Ruby Mace |
| 33 | DF | PHI | Maz Pacheco |
| 34 | MF | ENG | Ellie Jones |

=== Out on loan ===
Note: Flags indicate national team as defined under FIFA eligibility rules; some limited exceptions apply. Players may hold more than one non-FIFA nationality.

| No. | Pos. | Nation | Player |

== Staff ==
=== Current Staff ===
| Name | Job Title |
|---|---|
| (Scotland) Alan McTavish | Chief Executive Officer |
| (England) Scott Phelan | Manager |
| Jennifer Foster | Women's First Team Coach |
| (England) Phil Jevons | Interim First Team Coach |
| (Scotland) Ian McCaldon | Goalkeeping Coach |
| Chloe Edwards | Physical Performance Coach |
| Jacob Arnold | Sports Scientist |
| Catherine Wright | Director of Women's Football Operations |
| Connor Wagstaff | Sports Therapist |
| Alice Stratford | Performance Psychologist |
| Mike Sage | Kit Lead |
| Gary Featherstone | Safeguarding & Player Care Manager |
| Keris McRoberts | Operations Lead |
| Amy Lewtas | Player Care Lead |

== Honours ==
For a detailed international record see English women's football clubs in international competitions

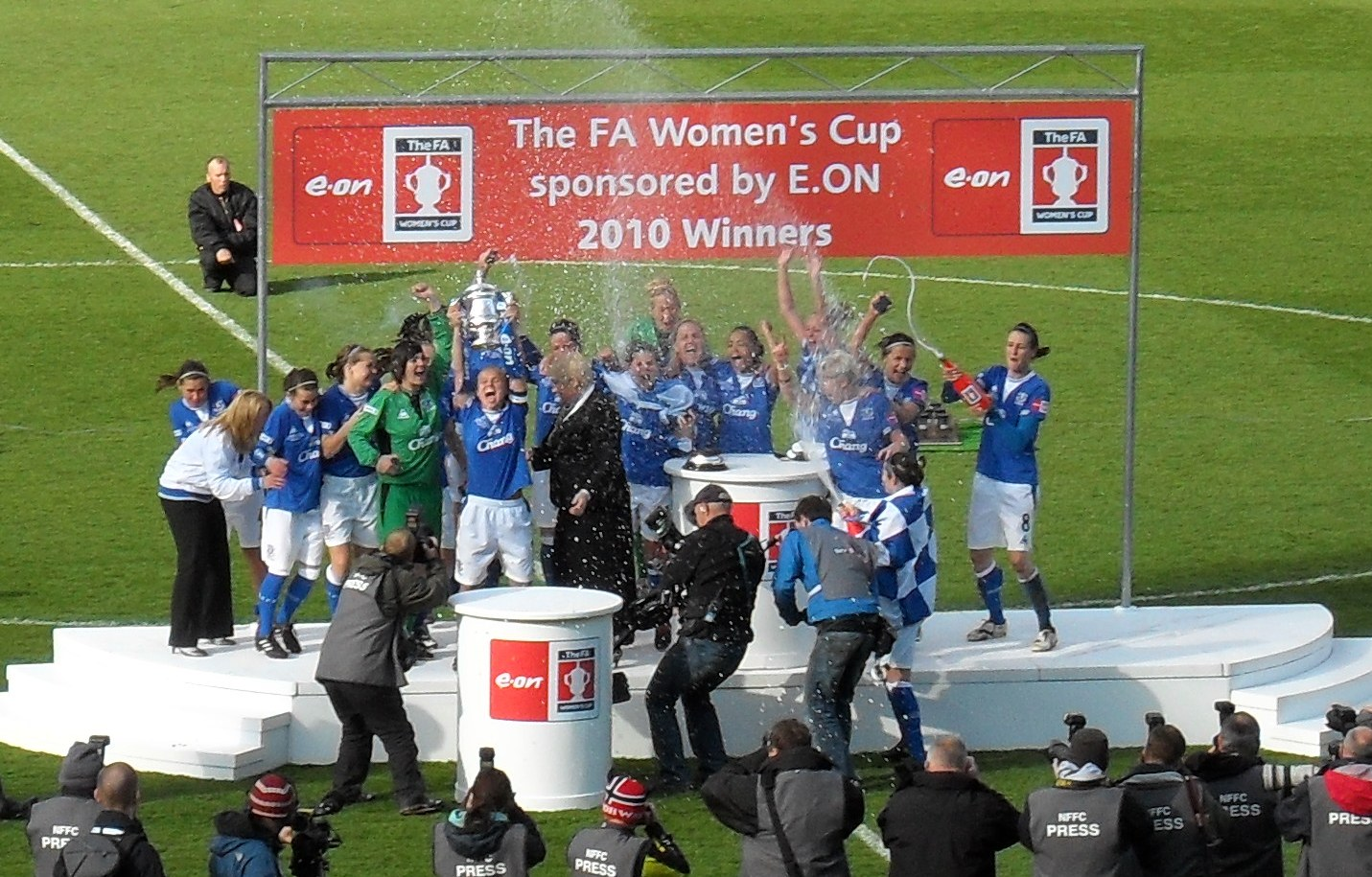
Everton Ladies celebrate the 2010 Cup win

- FA WSL 2 Spring Series:
  - Winners (1): 2017
- FA Women's Premier League National Division:
  - Winners (1): 1997–98
  - Runners-up (5): 2005–06, 2006–07, 2007–08, 2008–09, 2009–10
- FA Women's Cup:
  - Winners (2): 1988–89 (as Leasowe Pacific), 2009–10
  - Runners-up (4): 1987–88 (as Leasowe), 2004–05, 2013–14, 2019–20
- FA Women's Premier League Cup:
  - Winners (1): 2007–08
  - Runners-up (2): 1996–97, 1998–99
- FA Women's Community Shield:
  - Runners-up (2): 2006–07, 2008–09
- Liverpool County FA Cup:
  - Winners (3): 2006, 2007, 2008

== Managers ==
As of 4 February, 2026:

| Name | Tenure | M | W | D | L | Win % | Honours | Refs |
|---|---|---|---|---|---|---|---|---|
| (England) Keith Marley | 1998 – 2002 | | | | | | 1 National Division | |
| (England) Mo Marley | 2002 – 13 October 2012 | 206 | 129 | 26 | 51 | 62.2% | 1 FA Cup, 1 Premier League Cup | |
| (England) Andy Spence | 14 November 2012 – 10 June 2015 | 51 | 16 | 13 | 22 | 31.4% | | |
| (England) Nicola Anderson (interim) | 10 June 2015 – 15 December 2015 | 14 | 5 | 4 | 5 | 35.7% | | |
| (England) Andy Spence | 15 December 2015 – 7 November 2018 | 45 | 19 | 5 | 21 | 42.2% | 1 WSL2 | |
| (England) Jennifer Herst (interim) | 7 November 2018 – 1 December 2018 | 2 | 0 | 0 | 2 | 0.0% | | |
| (Scotland) Willie Kirk | 1 December 2018 – 16 October 2021 | 70 | 29 | 7 | 34 | 41.4% | | |
| (France) Jean-Luc Vasseur | 29 October 2021 – 1 February 2022 | 6 | 1 | 2 | 3 | 16.7% | | |
| (Scotland) Chris Roberts (interim) (Scotland) Claire Ditchburn (interim) | 1 February 2022 – 1 July 2022 | 13 | 3 | 3 | 7 | 23.1% | | |
| (Denmark) Brian Sorensen | 1 July 2022 – 4 February 2026 | 83 | 27 | 14 | 42 | 32.5% | | |
| (England) Scott Phelan | 4 February 2026 – | 0 | 0 | 0 | 0 | | | (Note: Phelan was originally interim manager before being confirmed as the permanent manager on 23 June 2026.) |

== Awards ==
=== Player of the Season ===
- 2006 – Jody Handley
- 2007 – Fara Williams
- 2008 – Lindsay Johnson
- 2009 – Fara Williams
- 2010 – Jill Scott
- 2011 – Natasha Dowie
- 2012 – Rachel Brown
- 2013 – Toni Duggan
- 2014 – Nikita Parris
- 2015 – Simone Magill
- 2016 – Kelly Jones
- 2017 – N/A
- 2018 – Angharad James
- 2019 – Simone Magill
- 2020 – Danielle Turner
- 2021 – Izzy Christiansen
- 2022 – Gabby George
- 2023 – Nathalie Björn
- 2024 – Courtney Brosnan
- 2025 – Sara Holmgaard
- 2026 – Courtney Brosnan

=== Supporters player of the season ===
- 2007 – Rachel Unitt
- 2008 – Rachel Brown
- 2009 – Danielle Hill
- 2010 – Fara Williams
- 2011 – Fara Williams
- 2012 – Toni Duggan
- 2013 – Toni Duggan & Lizzie Durack (tied)
- 2014 – Nikita Parris
- 2015 – Danielle Turner
- 2016 – Simone Magill
- 2017 – Gabby George
- 2018 – Angharad James
- 2019 – Simone Magill
- 2020 – Lucy Graham
- 2021 – Izzy Christiansen
- 2022 – Gabby George
- 2023 – Megan Finnigan
- 2024 – Clare Wheeler

=== Young Player of the Season ===
- 2019 – Chloe Kelly
- 2020 – Molly Pike
- 2021 – Poppy Pattinson
- 2022 – Hanna Bennison
- 2023 – Jess Park
- 2024 – Heather Payne
- 2025 – Martina Fernandez
- 2026 – Ruby Mace

=== Spirit of the Blues Award ===
- 2021 - Megan Finnigan
- 2022 - Aurora Galli
- 2023 - Nicoline Sørensen & Courtney Brosnan
- 2024 - Clare Wheeler & Lucy Hope
- 2025 - Justine Vanhaevermaet

== Other EFC teams ==
- Everton F.C. (men's)
- Everton Reserves and Academy

== See also ==
- List of women's association football clubs in England and Wales
- Women's football in England
- List of women's association football clubs
