= 2023–24 Everton F.C. (women) season =

Everton
2023–24 season
- Head coach: Brian Sørensen
- Stadium: Walton Hall Park, Liverpool
- WSL: 8th
- FA Cup: Quarter-finals
- League Cup: Group stage
- Top goalscorer: League: 4 players (3); All: Katja Snoeijs (5)
- Highest home attendance: 9,457 (vs. Liverpool, 24 March)
- Lowest home attendance: 886 (vs. Bristol City, 19 November)
- Average home league attendance: 2,071
Home colours	Away colours	Third colours

The 2023–24 Everton F.C. (women) season was the club's seventh consecutive campaign in the Women's Super League, the highest level of the football pyramid. Along with competing in the WSL, the club also contested two domestic cup competitions: the FA Cup and the League Cup.

== Squad ==
No.	Name	Position	Nationality	Date of birth (age)	Signed from	Contract end
Goalkeepers
1	Courtney Brosnan	GK	(Republic of Ireland)	10 November 1995 (age 30)	West Ham United	30 June 2024
12	Emily Ramsey	GK	(England)	16 November 2000 (age 25)	Manchester United	30 June 2026
Defenders
2	Katrine Veje	DF	(Denmark)	19 June 1991 (age 35)	Rosengård	30 June 2024
20	Megan Finnigan (c)	DF	(England)	2 April 1998 (age 28)	N/A	30 June 2026
23	Sara Holmgaard	DF	(Denmark)	28 January 1999 (age 27)	Turbine Potsdam	30 June 2024
27	Elise Stenevik	DF	(Norway)	9 September 1999 (age 26)	Eskilstuna United	30 June 2024
Midfielders
7	Clare Wheeler	MF	(Australia)	14 January 1998 (age 28)	Fortuna Hjørring	30 June 2025
8	Justine Vanhaevermaet	MF	(Belgium)	29 April 1992 (age 34)	Reading	30 June 2025
10	Hanna Bennison	MF	(Sweden)	16 October 2002 (age 23)	Rosengård	30 June 2025
11	Emma Bissell	MF	(England)	21 December 2001 (age 24)	Florida State Seminoles	30 June 2025
17	Lucy Hope	MF	(Scotland)	10 October 1996 (age 29)	Bristol City	30 June 2025
19	Heather Payne	MF	(Republic of Ireland)	26 January 2000 (age 26)	Florida State Seminoles	30 June 2025
21	Kathrine Møller Kühl	MF	(Denmark)	5 July 2003 (age 23)	Arsenal	30 June 2024
22	Aurora Galli	MF	(Italy)	13 December 1996 (age 29)	Juventus	30 June 2024
28	Karen Holmgaard	MF	(Denmark)	28 January 1999 (age 27)	Turbine Potsdam	30 June 2024
39	Issy Hobson	MF	(England)	31 October 2007 (age 18)	N/A	
47	Karoline Olesen	MF	(Denmark)	3 February 2005 (age 21)	Fortuna Hjørring	30 June 2025
Forwards
9	Toni Duggan	FW	(England)	25 July 1991 (age 35)	Atlético Madrid	30 June 2024
15	Eleanor Dale	FW	(England)	9 February 2002 (age 24)	Nebraska Cornhuskers	
18	Martina Piemonte	FW	(Italy)	7 November 1997 (age 28)	AC Milan	30 June 2025
25	Katja Snoeijs	FW	(Netherlands)	31 August 1996 (age 29)	Bordeaux	30 June 2024
26	Rikke Madsen	FW	(Denmark)	9 August 1997 (age 29)	North Carolina Courage	30 June 2025

== Preseason ==
2 September 2023 Friendly	Manchester United	1–0	Everton	Carrington
	Galton 37'	Report		Stadium: Trafford Training Centre; Attendance: Behind-closed-doors

9 September 2023 Friendly	Leicester City	3–2	Everton	Leicester
	Petermann 5'; O'Brien 33'; Tierney 58'	Report	Snoeijs 60'; Piemonte 83'	Stadium: Belvoir Drive; Attendance: Behind-closed-doors

16 September 2023 Friendly	Everton	3–4	Manchester City	Liverpool
	Piemonte 26'; Sørensen 69', 78'	Report	Fowler 39', 89'; Mace 64'; Morgan 86'	Stadium: Walton Hall Park; Attendance: Behind-closed-doors

== Women's Super League ==
=== Results summary ===
Overall								Home						Away					
Pld	W	D	L	GF	GA	GD	Pts	W	D	L	GF	GA	GD	W	D	L	GF	GA	GD
22	6	5	11	24	37	−13	23	1	4	6	10	22	−12	5	1	5	14	15	−1

Last updated: 18 May 2024.
Source: WSL

=== Results by matchday ===
Round	1	2	3	4	5	6	7	8	9	10	11	12	13	14	15	16	17	18	19	20	21	22
Ground	H	A	A	H	A	H	H	A	A	H	A	H	A	H	A	H	H	A	A	H	H	A
Result	L	L	W	L	D	L	D	W	W	L	L	L	L	W	L	L	D	L	W	D	D	W
Position	7	10	8	10	10	10	10	8	7	7	9	9	10	9	10	9	10	10	9	9	8	8

A = Away; H = Home; W = Win; D = Draw; L = Loss

=== Results ===
1 October 2023 1	Everton	1–2	Brighton & Hove Albion	Liverpool
13:00	Finnigan 65'	Report	Terland 3', 14'; Thorisdottir (yellow card) 35'; Sarri (yellow card) 90+4'	Stadium: Walton Hall Park; Attendance: 1,295; Referee: Kirsty Dowle

8 October 2023 2	Leicester City	1–0	Everton	Leicester
15:00	Green (yellow card) 45+1'; Petermann 69'	Report	Hope (yellow card) 22'; Vanhaevermaet (yellow card) 60'	Stadium: King Power Stadium; Attendance: 2,150; Referee: Stacey Fullicks

15 October 2023 3	Liverpool	0–1	Everton	Liverpool
16:30	Hinds (yellow card) 77'	Report	Finnigan 31'; Payne (yellow card) 78'; Vanhaevermaet (yellow card) 88'; Brosnan (yellow card) 90+1'	Stadium: Anfield; Attendance: 23,088; Referee: Abigail Byrne

22 October 2023 4	Everton	0–5	Manchester United	Liverpool
13:00	Björn (yellow card) 63'	Report	Malard 14'; Parris 58', 90+3'; Williams 77', 85'; Riviere (yellow card) 82'	Stadium: Walton Hall Park; Attendance: 1,990; Referee: Adam Herczeg

5 November 2023 5	Tottenham Hotspur	1–1	Everton	Leyton
14:00	Clinton (yellow card) 42', (goal) 43'; Thomas (yellow card) 90+6'	Report	Galli (yellow card) 37', (goal) 85' (pen.); Payne (yellow card) 90+5'	Stadium: Brisbane Road; Attendance: 1,920; Referee: Emily Heaslip

12 November 2023 6	Everton	0–3	Chelsea	Liverpool
13:00		Report	Fleming 14', (yellow card) 43'; Nüsken (yellow card) 53'; Kerr 62'; Beever-Jones 90'	Stadium: Walton Hall Park; Attendance: 1,737; Referee: Lauren Impey

19 November 2023 7	Everton	2–2	Bristol City	Liverpool
13:00	Piemonte 5', (yellow card) 69'; Finnigan 57'	Report	Rodgers 45+1'; Thestrup 82'	Stadium: Walton Hall Park; Attendance: 886; Referee: Adewunmi Soneye

26 November 2023 8	Aston Villa	1–2	Everton	Aston
16:30	Daly 55'	Report	K. Holmgaard (yellow card) 20'; Snoeijs (yellow card) 45'; Patten 54' (o.g.); Björn 74' (pen.); Vanhaevermaet (yellow card) 90+2'	Stadium: Villa Park; Attendance: 4,203; Referee: Stacey Pearson

10 December 2023 9	West Ham United	0–1	Everton	Dagenham
15:00	Asseyi (yellow card) 53'	Report	Finnigann (yellow card) 34'; K. Holmgaard 63'	Stadium: Victoria Road; Attendance: 614; Referee: Adewunmi Soneye

17 December 2023 10	Everton	1–4	Manchester City	Liverpool
13:00	Galli 56'; S. Holmgaard (yellow card) 57'; Payne (yellow card) 61'	Report	Shaw 9', 22', 65'; Roord 25'; Kelly (yellow card) 62'	Stadium: Walton Hall Park; Attendance: 1,167; Referee: Stacey Pearson

20 January 2024 11	Arsenal	2–1	Everton	Borehamwood
14:00	Foord 9'; Mead 45+3'; Wälti (yellow card) 90+2'	Report	Snoeijs 24'; Galli (yellow card) 45+5'; Bennison (yellow card) 80'; Campbell (yellow card) 90+1'	Stadium: Meadow Park; Attendance: 3,713; Referee: Melissa Burgin

28 January 2024 12	Everton	0–1	Leicester City	Liverpool
12:30		Report	Green (yellow card) 12'; O'Brien (yellow card) 29'; Cayman 53'	Stadium: Walton Hall Park; Attendance: 891; Referee: Cheryl Foster

4 February 2024 13	Chelsea	3–0	Everton	Kingston upon Thames
18:45	Reiten 27' (pen.), 72' (pen.); James (yellow card) 65'; Cuthbert 83'	Report	Wheeler (yellow card) 26'; Brosnan (yellow card) 26'	Stadium: Kingsmeadow; Attendance: 2,013; Referee: Emily Heaslip

18 February 2024 14	Everton	2–0	West Ham United	Liverpool
13:00	Finnigan (yellow card) 58'; Piemonte 83'; Galli 86'; Stenevik (yellow card) 90+3'; Olesen (yellow card) 90+5'	Report		Stadium: Walton Hall Park; Attendance: 997; Referee: Anthony Backhouse

3 March 2024 15	Manchester City	2–1	Everton	Manchester
12:00	Shaw 15'; Hemp 55'	Report	Bennison 60'	Stadium: Academy Stadium; Attendance: 3,223; Referee: Lauren Impey

16 March 2024 16	Everton	1–2	Aston Villa	Liverpool
13:00	Stenevik (yellow card) 70' (yellow-red card) 90+6', (goal) 85'	Report	Dali 55'; Salmon 60'; Taylor (yellow card) 90+4'	Stadium: Walton Hall Park; Attendance: 1,097; Referee: Phoebe Cross

24 March 2024 17	Everton	0–0	Liverpool	Liverpool
13:00		Report	Holland (yellow card) 14'	Stadium: Goodison Park; Attendance: 9,457; Referee: Kirsty Dowle

31 March 2024 18	Manchester United	4–1	Everton	Leigh
12:00	Turner 57'; Toone 60', 65'; Galton 90'; Williams (yellow card) 90+5'	Report	Snoeijs 10', (yellow card) 23'	Stadium: Leigh Sports Village; Attendance: 4,902; Referee: Lauren Impey

19 April 2024 19	Brighton & Hove Albion	1–2	Everton	Falmer
19:00	Pinto (yellow card) 59', (goal) 63'	Report	Stenevik (yellow card) 49'; K. Holmgaard 60'; Bergsvand 72' (o.g.); Finnigan (yellow card) 75'	Stadium: Falmer Stadium; Attendance: 4,967; Referee: Kirsty Dowle

28 April 2024 20	Everton	1–1	Arsenal	Liverpool
12:30	Hobson 90+5'; Snoeijs (yellow card) 90+8'	Report	Russo 80'	Stadium: Walton Hall Park; Attendance: 1,997; Referee: Phoebe Cross

4 May 2024 21	Everton	2–2	Tottenham Hotspur	Liverpool
12:00	S. Holmgaard 10', (yellow card) 55'; Vanhaevermaet 15'; Stenevik (yellow card) 39'	Report	Spence (yellow card) 42', (goal) 45'; England 48'; Bartrip (yellow card) 89'	Stadium: Walton Hall Park; Attendance: 1,262; Referee: Lauren Impey

18 May 2024 22	Bristol City	0–4	Everton	Bristol
15:00		Report	Snoeijs 16'; S. Holmgaard 23'; Bissell 48'; Piemonte 90+4'	Stadium: Ashton Gate; Attendance: 4,112; Referee: Grace Lowe

=== League table ===
Pos	Team	Pld	W	D	L	GF	GA	GD	Pts
6	Tottenham Hotspur	22	8	7	7	31	36	−5	31
7	Aston Villa	22	7	3	12	27	43	−16	24
8	Everton	22	6	5	11	24	37	−13	23
9	Brighton & Hove Albion	22	5	4	13	26	48	−22	19
10	Leicester City	22	4	6	12	26	45	−19	18

Source: Women's Super League Table
Rules for classification: 1) Points; 2) Goal difference; 3) Number of goals scored.

== Women's FA Cup ==
As a member of the first tier, Everton entered the FA Cup in the fourth round proper.

13 January 2024 Fourth round	Aston Villa	0–3	Everton	Walsall
12:30		Report	Olesen 58'; Snoeijs 80', 87' (pen.)	Stadium: Bescot Stadium; Attendance: 1,394; Referee: Amy Fearns

11 February 2024 Fifth round	Nottingham Forest	1–7	Everton	Long Eaton
16:00	Greengrass 47'; Domingo (yellow card) 42'; Haughey (yellow card) 79'	Report	Kühl 23'; Piemonte 33'; Vanhaevermaet 52'; Batty 73' (o.g.); Bissell 84'; Duggan 88' (pen.); Bennison 90+4'	Stadium: Grange Park; Attendance: 1,130; Referee: Phoebe Cross

10 March 2024 Quarter-final	Everton	0–1	Chelsea	Liverpool
13:00	Payne (yellow card) 45+2'	Report	Carter (yellow card) 61'; Macario 66'	Stadium: Walton Hall Park; Attendance: 1,212; Referee: Abigail Byrne

== FA Women's League Cup ==
11 October 2023 Group Stage	Everton	1–2	Manchester City	Liverpool
19:00	Duggan 90+3'	Report	Park 21'; Coombs (yellow card) 46'; Shaw 47'	Stadium: Walton Hall Park; Attendance: 1,105; Referee: Megan Wilson

9 November 2023 Group Stage	Manchester United	7–0	Everton	Leigh
19:00	Parris 28', 69', 78'; Williams 30'; Ladd 57'; Geyse 84'; Galton 89'	Report	S. Holmgaard (yellow card) 74'	Stadium: Leigh Sports Village; Attendance: 1,804; Referee: Megan Wilson

13 December 2023 Group Stage	Everton	1–2	Liverpool	Liverpool
19:00	Duggan 90+9'	Report	Haug 5'; Daniëls 56'	Stadium: Walton Hall Park; Attendance: 1,242; Referee: Melissa Burgin

24 January 2024 Group Stage	Leicester City	5–1	Everton	Burton upon Trent
19:00	Tierney 18'; Rose 20'; O'Brien 28' (pen.); Goodwin 48'; Rantala 82'	Report	Galli (yellow card) 41'; Bissell (yellow card) 42'; Wilding (yellow card) 61'; Bennison 90+6'	Stadium: Pirelli Stadium; Attendance: 231; Referee: Megan Wilson

Pos	Team	Pld	W	PW	PL	L	GF	GA	GD	Pts	Qualification	MCI	MUN	LEI	LIV	EVE
1	Manchester City (Q)	4	3	0	1	0	10	7	+3	10	Advanced to knock-out stage	—	2–1	2–2	–	–
2	Manchester United	4	3	0	0	1	12	3	+9	9	Possible knock-out stage based on ranking	–	—	3–1	–	7–0
3	Leicester City	4	2	1	0	1	10	7	+3	8		–	–	—	2–1	5–1
4	Liverpool	4	1	0	0	3	6	8	−2	3		3–4	0–1	–	—	–
5	Everton	4	0	0	0	4	3	16	−13	0		1–2	–	–	1–2	—

Source: FA Women's League Cup
Rules for classification: 1) Points; 2) Goal difference; 3) Number of goals scored; 4) Number of wins; 5) Head-to-head record
(Q) Qualified to the phase indicated

== Squad statistics ==
=== Appearances ===
As of match played 18 May 2024

Starting appearances are listed first, followed by substitute appearances after the + symbol where applicable.

No.	Pos	Nat	Player	Total		WSL		FA Cup		League Cup	
No.	Pos	Nat	Player	Apps	Goals	Apps	Goals	Apps	Goals	Apps	Goals
1	GK	(Republic of Ireland) IRL	Courtney Brosnan	26	0	20	0	3	0	2+1	0
2	DF	(Denmark) DEN	Katrine Veje	15	0	9+4	0	0	0	1+1	0
7	MF	(Australia) AUS	Clare Wheeler	29	0	19+3	0	3	0	3+1	0
8	MF	(Belgium) BEL	Justine Vanhaevermaet	24	2	17+2	1	2	1	2+1	0
9	FW	(England) ENG	Toni Duggan	15	3	1+9	0	0+1	1	3+1	2
10	MF	(Sweden) SWE	Hanna Bennison	27	3	16+4	1	2+1	1	1+3	1
11	MF	(England) ENG	Emma Bissell	29	2	9+13	1	2+1	1	4	0
12	GK	(England) ENG	Emily Ramsey	4	0	2	0	0	0	2	0
15	FW	(England) ENG	Eleanor Dale	8	0	0+6	0	0+2	0	0	0
17	MF	(Scotland) SCO	Lucy Hope	19	0	11+3	0	1+2	0	1+1	0
18	FW	(Italy) ITA	Martina Piemonte	23	4	8+11	3	2	1	1+1	0
19	MF	(Republic of Ireland) IRL	Heather Payne	22	0	15+2	0	2	0	0+3	0
20	MF	(England) ENG	Megan Finnigan	27	3	21	3	3	0	2+1	0
21	MF	(Denmark) DEN	Kathrine Møller Kühl	13	1	10	0	2+1	1	0	0
22	MF	(Italy) ITA	Aurora Galli	26	3	19	3	3	0	4	0
23	DF	(Denmark) DEN	Sara Holmgaard	15	2	11+1	2	1	0	0+2	0
25	FW	(Netherlands) NED	Katja Snoeijs	22	5	17+2	3	3	2	0	0
26	FW	(Denmark) DEN	Rikke Madsen	8	0	4+1	0	0+2	0	1	0
27	DF	(Norway) NOR	Elise Stenevik	15	1	11	1	3	0	1	0
28	MF	(Denmark) DEN	Karen Holmgaard	14	2	5+8	2	0	0	0+1	0
30	DF	(England) ENG	Annie Wilding	5	0	0+1	0	0+1	0	3	0
39	MF	(England) ENG	Issy Hobson	5	1	0+4	1	0	0	0+1	0
40	DF	(England) ENG	Macy Settle	3	0	0+1	0	0	0	2	0
42	FW	(England) ENG	Holly Jones	0	0	0	0	0	0	0	0
47	MF	(Denmark) DEN	Karoline Olesen	19	1	3+10	0	1+1	1	4	0
Players who appeared for the club but left during the season:
3	DF	(Republic of Ireland) IRL	Megan Campbell	9	0	0+6	0	0+1	0	2	0
5	DF	(Sweden) SWE	Nathalie Björn	10	1	6+2	1	0	0	1+1	0
14	FW	(Denmark) DEN	Nicoline Sørensen	11	0	8+1	0	0	0	2	0
41	FW	(England) ENG	Alyssa Aherne	3	0	0+1	0	0	0	2	0

== Transfers ==
=== Transfers in ===
Date	Position	Nationality	Name	From	Ref.
5 July 2023	FW	(Italy)	Martina Piemonte	(Italy) AC Milan	
29 July 2023	GK	(England)	Emily Ramsey	(England) Manchester United	
2 August 2023	MF	(England)	Emma Bissell	(United States) Florida State Seminoles	
3 August 2023	MF	(Belgium)	Justine Vanhaevermaet	(England) Reading	
15 August 2023	MF	(Denmark)	Karoline Olesen	(Denmark) Fortuna Hjørring	
25 August 2023	MF	(Republic of Ireland)	Heather Payne	(United States) Florida State Seminoles	
28 September 2023	GK	(England)	Libby Hart	(England) Birmingham City	
29 September 2023	DF	(Republic of Ireland)	Megan Campbell	(England) Liverpool	
13 January 2024	FW	(Denmark)	Rikke Madsen	(United States) North Carolina Courage	
1 February 2024	FW	(England)	Eleanor Dale	(United States) Nebraska Cornhuskers	

=== Loans in ===
Date	Position	Nationality	Name	From	Until	Ref.
15 September 2023	FW	(England)	Alyssa Aherne	(England) Manchester United	5 January 2024	
13 January 2024	MF	(Denmark)	Kathrine Møller Kühl	(England) Arsenal	End of season	

=== Transfers out ===
Date	Position	Nationality	Name	To	Ref.
28 May 2023	MF	(England)	Izzy Christiansen	Retired	
28 May 2023	DF	(Germany)	Leonie Maier	(Germany) 1899 Hoffenheim	
28 May 2023	DF	(Denmark)	Rikke Sevecke	(United States) Portland Thorns	
14 September 2023	DF	(England)	Gabby George	(England) Manchester United	
31 December 2023	FW	(Denmark)	Nicoline Sørensen	Retired	
10 January 2024	DF	(Sweden)	Nathalie Björn	(England) Chelsea	
31 January 2024	DF	(Republic of Ireland)	Megan Campbell	(England) London City Lionesses	
9 February 2024	FW	(England)	Abby Clarke	(England) Burnley	

=== Loans out ===
Date	Position	Nationality	Name	To	Until	Ref.
4 July 2023	DF	(Scotland)	Kenzie Weir	(Scotland) Glasgow City	End of season	
