= 2024–25 Everton F.C. (women) season =

Everton
2024–25 season
- Head coach: Brian Sørensen
- Stadium: Walton Hall Park, Liverpool
- WSL: 8th
- FA Cup: Fifth round
- League Cup: Group stage
- Top goalscorer: League: 3 players (4); All: Kelly Gago (5)
- Highest home attendance: 9,823 (vs. Liverpool, 17 November)
- Lowest home attendance: 754 (vs. Crystal Palace, 22 March)
- Average home league attendance: 2,062
- Biggest win: 4–1 v Leicester City (H) (WSL, 2 February 2025); 3–0 v Crystal Palace (H) (WSL, 22 March 2025)
- Biggest defeat: 0–5 v Chelsea (H) (WSL, 3 November 2024)
Home colours	Away colours	Third colours

The 2024–25 Everton F.C. (women) season was the club's eighth consecutive campaign in the Women's Super League, the highest level of the football pyramid. Along with competing in the WSL, the club also contested two domestic cup competitions: the FA Cup and the League Cup.

== Squad ==
As of 2 February 2025

Note: Flags indicate national team as defined under FIFA eligibility rules; some limited exceptions apply. Players may hold more than one non-FIFA nationality.

No.	Pos.	Nation	Player
1	GK	IRL	Courtney Brosnan
3	DF	NOR	Maren Mjelde
5	DF	ESP	Martina Fernández (on loan from Barcelona)
6	MF	JPN	Honoka Hayashi
7	MF	AUS	Clare Wheeler
8	MF	BEL	Justine Vanhaevermaet
9	FW	NGR	Toni Payne
10	FW	ESP	Inma Gabarro
12	GK	ENG	Emily Ramsey
14	FW	ENG	Melissa Lawley
15	FW	FRA	Louna Ribadeira (on loan from Chelsea)
16	MF	WAL	Hayley Ladd
17	MF	SCO	Lucy Hope
18	MF	SCO	Emma Watson (on loan from Manchester United)
19	MF	IRL	Heather Payne

No.	Pos.	Nation	Player
20	DF	ENG	Megan Finnigan (captain)
21	MF	GRE	Veatriki Sarri
22	MF	ITA	Aurora Galli
23	MF	DEN	Sara Holmgaard
24	DF	SCO	Kenzie Weir
25	FW	NED	Katja Snoeijs
26	FW	DEN	Rikke Madsen
27	DF	NOR	Elise Stenevik
28	MF	DEN	Karen Holmgaard
29	FW	FRA	Kelly Gago
31	MF	WAL	Rebecca Guy
35	FW	WAL	Emily Cole
36	MF	ENG	Rubie Deaville
42	MF	WAL	Lauren Thomas
47	MF	DEN	Karoline Olesen

== Preseason ==
28 July 2024 Friendly	Everton	–	(Scotland) Celtic	Halewood
				Stadium: Finch Farm; Attendance: Behind-closed-doors
Note: No scoreline announced

11 August 2024 Friendly	Everton	0–1	Burnley	Halewood
		Report	90'	Stadium: Finch Farm; Attendance: Behind-closed-doors

18 August 2024 Friendly	Everton	4–0	Newcastle United	Halewood
	Sarri 6'; Snoeijs 62'; Piemonte 75', 82'	Report		Stadium: Finch Farm; Attendance: Behind-closed-doors

25 August 2024 Friendly	Everton	1–2	Sunderland	Halewood
	Gabarro 20'	Report	Kitching 61'; Westrup 63'	Stadium: Finch Farm; Attendance: Behind-closed-doors

1 September 2024 Friendly	Everton	–	Blackburn Rovers	Halewood
				Stadium: Finch Farm; Attendance: Behind-closed-doors
Note: No scoreline announced

8 September 2024 Friendly	Everton	1–3	Aston Villa	Walton
14:00	S. Holmgaard	Report	Own goal (o.g.); Daly; Pacheco	Stadium: Walton Hall Park

15 September 2024 Friendly	Liverpool	0–0	Everton	St Helens
14:00		Report		Stadium: Totally Wicked Stadium

== Women's Super League ==
=== Results summary ===
Overall								Home						Away					
Pld	W	D	L	GF	GA	GD	Pts	W	D	L	GF	GA	GD	W	D	L	GF	GA	GD
22	6	6	10	24	32	−8	24	4	3	4	16	17	−1	2	3	6	8	15	−7

Last updated: 10 May 2025.
Source: WSL

=== Results by matchday ===
Round	1	2	3	4	5	6	7	8	9	10	11	12	13	14	15	16	17	18	19	20	21	22
Ground	A	H	A	H	A	H	A	H	A	H	H	A	H	A	A	H	H	A	A	H	A	H
Result	L	L	D	D	L	L	D	W	L	W	D	L	W	L	W	L	W	L	D	L	W	D
Position	12	11	12	12	11	12	12	9	10	9	9	10	8	9	8	8	7	8	8	8	8	8

A = Away; H = Home; W = Win; D = Draw; L = Loss

=== Results ===
21 September 2024 1	Brighton & Hove Albion	4–0	Everton	Crawley
12:30	Seike 29', 56', 75'; Kirby 68' (pen.); Symonds (yellow card) 81'; Čanković (yellow card) 90+4'	Report	Vanhaevermaet (yellow card) 65'	Stadium: Broadfield Stadium; Attendance: 2,125; Referee: Lauren Impey

29 September 2024 2	Everton	0–1	Manchester United	Walton
12:30	Snoeijs (yellow card) 44'; S. Holmgaard (yellow card) 59'	Report	Clinton 4'; Riviere (yellow card) 45'; Malard (yellow card) 74'	Stadium: Walton Hall Park; Attendance: 1,343; Referee: Kirsty Dowle

6 October 2024 3	Arsenal	0–0	Everton	Holloway
14:00		Report	Payne (yellow card) 80'; Brosnan (yellow card) 90+4'	Stadium: Emirates Stadium; Attendance: 25,480; Referee: Stacey Pearson

13 October 2024 4	Everton	1–1	West Ham United	Walton
14:00	S. Holmgaard (yellow card) 60'; Sáez 72' (o.g.)	Report	Denton 10'; Asseyi (yellow card) 76'; Gorry (yellow card) 80'; Cooke (yellow card) 90+2'	Stadium: Walton Hall Park; Attendance: 1,087; Referee: Richie Watkins

20 October 2024 5	Leicester City	1–0	Everton	Leicester
15:00	Momiki 8', (yellow card) 71'	Report	S. Holmgaard (yellow card) 11'	Stadium: King Power Stadium; Attendance: 1,398; Referee: Adewunmi Soneye

3 November 2024 6	Everton	0–5	Chelsea	Liverpool
18:45		Report	Beever-Jones 14', (yellow card) 64'; Cuthbert 43'; Reiten 45+1'; Kaptein 82'; Lawrence 83'	Stadium: Goodison Park; Attendance: 2,109; Referee: Stacey Fullicks

10 November 2024 7	Crystal Palace	1–1	Everton	Sutton
14:00	Riley 1'; Potter (yellow card) 86'	Report	Hayashi 72'	Stadium: Gander Green Lane; Attendance: 502; Referee: Kirsty Dowle

17 November 2024 8	Everton	1–0	Liverpool	Liverpool
15:00	Snoeijs 41' (pen.)	Report		Stadium: Goodison Park; Attendance: 9,823; Referee: Abigail Byrne

8 December 2024 9	Tottenham Hotspur	2–1	Everton	Leyton
13:00	England 25' (pen.), 48' (pen.); Naz (yellow card) 45+1'	Report	S. Holmgaard 40', (yellow card) 75'	Stadium: Brisbane Road; Attendance: 918; Referee: Amy Fearn

15 December 2024 10	Everton	2–1	Manchester City	Walton
12:30	Hope 31'; Hayashi 39'; S. Holmgaard (yellow card) 68'; Olesen (yellow card) 88'	Report	Fowler 89' (pen.)	Stadium: Walton Hall Park; Attendance: 1,292; Referee: Cheryl Foster

18 January 2025 11	Everton	1–1	Aston Villa	Walton
17:30	Gago (yellow card) 78'; Sarri 89'; Ribadeira (yellow card) 90+1'; Lawley (yellow card) 90+6'	Report	Daly 31'; Baijings (yellow card) 45+2'; Maritz (yellow card) 90+5'	Stadium: Walton Hall Park; Attendance: 973; Referee: Stacey Fullicks

26 January 2025 12	West Ham United	2–0	Everton	Dagenham
15:00	Martinez 9', (yellow card) 61'; Asseyi 45' (pen.); Tysiak (yellow card) 84'	Report	Payne (yellow card) 69'	Stadium: Victoria Road; Attendance: 1,219; Referee: Adewunmi Soneye

2 February 2025 13	Everton	4–1	Leicester City	Walton
14:00	Gago 5', 69'; S. Holmgaard (yellow card) 12'; Ladd (yellow card) 39'; Snoeijs 48'; Hayashi 57'	Report	O'Brien 16'	Stadium: Walton Hall Park; Attendance: 784; Referee: Stacey Pearson

16 February 2025 14	Chelsea	2–1	Everton	Kingston upon Thames
14:00	Ramírez 62'; James 90+3'	Report	Stenevik (yellow card) 41'; Gago 51'; Mjelde (yellow card) 57'; Brosnan (yellow card) 90+3'	Stadium: Kingsmeadow; Attendance: 3,648; Referee: Phoebe Cross

2 March 2025 15	Aston Villa	0–2	Everton	Aston
14:00	Robinson (yellow card) 48'	Report	Mjelde 16'; Ladd (yellow card) 25'; Hayashi 59'	Stadium: Villa Park; Attendance: 2,936; Referee: Stacey Pearson

14 March 2025 16	Everton	1–3	Arsenal	Walton
19:00	Payne 36'	Report	Russo 24', 90'; Mjelde 63' (o.g.)	Stadium: Walton Hall Park; Attendance: 1,613; Referee: Grace Lowe

22 March 2025 17	Everton	3–0	Crystal Palace	Walton
14:00	Vanhaevermaet 43'; S. Holmgaard 46'; Gago 90+5'	Report		Stadium: Walton Hall Park; Attendance: 754; Referee: Adewunmi Soneye

30 March 2025 18	Manchester United	2–0	Everton	Leigh
12:00	Janssen 22'; Clinton 47'; Le Tissier (yellow card) 68'; Sandberg (yellow card) 82'	Report	Payne (yellow card) 22'	Stadium: Leigh Sports Village; Attendance: 3,856; Referee: Phoebe Cross

20 April 2025 19	Manchester City	1–1	Everton	Manchester
13:00	Casparij 13'; Park (yellow card) 30'; Knaak (yellow card) 43'	Report	K. Holmgaard 33'; Lawley (yellow card) 90+5'	Stadium: Academy Stadium; Referee: Phoebe Cross

27 April 2025 20	Everton	2–3	Brighton & Hove Albion	Walton
14:00	S. Holmgaard 9', (yellow card) 90+1'; Snoeijs 23'; Stenevik (yellow card) 61'; Wheeler (yellow card) 65'	Report	Agyemang 21'; Auée (yellow card) 29'; Kirby 44'; Symonds (yellow card) 55'; Hayes (yellow card) 80'; Parris 90+3'	Stadium: Walton Hall Park; Attendance: 843; Referee: Megan Wilson

4 May 2025 21	Liverpool	0–2	Everton	Liverpool
12:00	Fisk (yellow card) 79'	Report	Snoeijs 7'; S. Holmgaard (yellow card) 41' (yellow-red card) 81'; K. Holmgaard 69'; Madsen (yellow card) 89'	Stadium: Anfield; Attendance: 15,376; Referee: Lisa Benn

10 May 2025 22	Everton	1–1	Tottenham Hotspur	Walton
12:30	Sarri 11'; Issy Hobson (yellow card) 72'	Report	Morris (yellow card) 10'; Spence 30'; Hunt (yellow card) 51'; Nildén (yellow card) 59'; Neville (yellow card) 69'; Ahtinen (yellow card) 89'; Thomas (yellow card) 90+3'	Stadium: Walton Hall Park; Referee: Stacey Fullicks

=== League table ===
Pos	Team	Pld	W	D	L	GF	GA	GD	Pts
6	Aston Villa	22	7	4	11	32	44	−12	25
7	Liverpool	22	7	4	11	22	37	−15	25
8	Everton	22	6	6	10	24	32	−8	24
9	West Ham United	22	6	5	11	36	41	−5	23
10	Leicester City	22	5	5	12	21	37	−16	20

Source: The Football Association
Rules for classification: 1) Points; 2) Goal difference; 3) Number of goals scored.

== Women's FA Cup ==
As a member of the first tier, Everton entered the FA Cup in the fourth round proper.

29 January 2025 Fourth round	Everton	2–0	Tottenham Hotspur	Walton
19:00	Ladd (yellow card) 45+4'; S. Holmgaard (yellow card) 45+6'; Gago 48'; Payne 90+2'	Report		Stadium: Walton Hall Park; Referee: Cheryl Foster
Note: Rescheduled from 12 January due to frozen pitch.

9 February 2025 Fifth round	Chelsea	4–1	Everton	Kingston upon Thames
15:00	Macario 36' (pen.); Ramírez 45+2'; Hamano 71'; Baltimore 90+2' (pen.)	Report	S. Holmgaard 17'	Stadium: Kingsmeadow; Referee: Amy Fearn

== Women's League Cup ==
2 October 2024 Group stage	Newcastle United	1–1 (0–3 p)	Everton	Newcastle upon Tyne
19:45	Stokes 5'	Report	Finnigan (yellow card) 25'; Bissell 50'	Stadium: Kingston Park; Attendance: 1,379; Referee: Grace Lowe
	Penalties
	Andrews (penalty missed); Gibson (penalty missed); Furness (penalty missed)		(penalty scored) Vanhaevermaet; (penalty scored) Snoeijs; (penalty scored) Finnigan

20 November 2024 Group stage	Everton	0–2	Manchester United	Liverpool
19:00		Report	Brosnan 15' (o.g.); Watson (yellow card) 43'; Geyse (yellow card) 56'; Le Tissier 77'	Stadium: Walton Hall Park; Attendance: 789; Referee: Phoebe Cross

11 December 2024 Group stage	Liverpool	4–0	Everton	St Helens
18:00	Clark 28'; Enderby 58', 90'; Kapocs 83'	Report		Stadium: Totally Wicked Stadium; Attendance: 3,219; Referee: Adewunmi Soneye

Pos	Team	Pld	W	PW	PL	L	GF	GA	GD	Pts	Qualification	MUN	LIV	EVE	NUN
1	Manchester United	3	3	0	0	0	9	3	+6	9	Advanced to knock-out stage	—	2–0	–	5–3
2	Liverpool	3	2	0	0	1	10	3	+7	6		–	—	4–0	–
3	Everton	3	0	1	0	2	1	7	−6	2		0–2	–	—	–
4	Newcastle United	3	0	0	1	2	5	12	−7	1		–	1–6	1–1	—

Updated to match(es) played on 24 November 2024. Source: Women's League Cup
Rules for classification: 1) Points; 2) Goal difference; 3) Number of goals scored; 4) Number of wins; 5) Head-to-head record

== Squad statistics ==
=== Appearances ===
As of match played 10 May 2025

Starting appearances are listed first, followed by substitute appearances after the + symbol where applicable.

No.	Pos	Nat	Player	Total		WSL		FA Cup		League Cup	
No.	Pos	Nat	Player	Apps	Goals	Apps	Goals	Apps	Goals	Apps	Goals
1	GK	(Republic of Ireland) IRL	Courtney Brosnan	24	0	21	0	1	0	2	0
3	DF	(Norway) NOR	Maren Mjelde	6	1	5	1	1	0	0	0
4	MF	(England) ENG	Issy Hobson	11	0	1+7	0	0	0	3	0
5	DF	(Spain) ESP	Martina Fernández	14	0	12	0	2	0	0	0
6	MF	(Japan) JPN	Honoka Hayashi	25	4	20+1	4	2	0	2	0
7	MF	(Australia) AUS	Clare Wheeler	21	0	17+2	0	0+1	0	0+1	0
8	MF	(Belgium) BEL	Justine Vanhaevermaet	24	1	18+3	1	0+2	0	0+1	0
9	FW	(Nigeria) NGR	Toni Payne	26	1	16+6	1	1+1	0	2	0
10	FW	(Spain) ESP	Inma Gabarro	2	0	2	0	0	0	0	0
12	GK	(England) ENG	Emily Ramsey	3	0	1	0	1	0	1	0
14	FW	(England) ENG	Melissa Lawley	21	0	3+14	0	0+2	0	2	0
15	FW	(France) FRA	Louna Ribadeira	3	0	0+3	0	0	0	0	0
16	MF	(Wales) WAL	Hayley Ladd	11	0	8+1	0	2	0	0	0
17	MF	(Scotland) SCO	Lucy Hope	18	1	11+3	1	2	0	2	0
18	MF	(Scotland) SCO	Emma Watson	8	0	0+6	0	2	0	0	0
19	MF	(Republic of Ireland) IRL	Heather Payne	20	1	13+4	0	0+2	1	0+1	0
20	MF	(England) ENG	Megan Finnigan	15	0	12	0	1	0	2	0
21	MF	(Greece) GRE	Veatriki Sarri	21	2	6+12	2	0	0	3	0
22	MF	(Italy) ITA	Aurora Galli	2	0	1+1	0	0	0	0	0
23	DF	(Denmark) DEN	Sara Holmgaard	23	4	19	3	2	1	2	0
24	DF	(Scotland) SCO	Kenzie Weir	0	0	0	0	0	0	0	0
25	FW	(Netherlands) NED	Katja Snoeijs	25	4	22	4	2	0	0+1	0
26	FW	(Denmark) DEN	Rikke Madsen	5	0	1+4	0	0	0	0	0
27	DF	(Norway) NOR	Elise Stenevik	15	0	10+3	0	0+1	0	0+1	0
28	MF	(Denmark) DEN	Karen Holmgaard	9	2	4+5	2	0	0	0	0
29	FW	(France) FRA	Kelly Gago	12	5	9+1	4	2	1	0	0
31	MF	(Wales) WAL	Rebecca Guy	1	0	0	0	0	0	1	0
32	FW	(England) ENG	Jessica Brady	1	0	0	0	0	0	0+1	0
34	MF	(Poland) POL	Aisha Nsaneou	1	0	0	0	0	0	0+1	0
35	FW	(Wales) WAL	Emily Cole	2	0	0	0	0	0	1+1	0
36	MF	(England) ENG	Rubie Deaville	2	0	0	0	0	0	0+2	0
37	FW	(England) ENG	Cerys Neil	1	0	0	0	0	0	0+1	0
42	MF	(Wales) WAL	Lauren Thomas	4	0	0+1	0	0	0	2+1	0
45	DF	(England) ENG	Erin Caldecott	1	0	0	0	0	0	0+1	0
47	MF	(Denmark) DEN	Karoline Olesen	23	0	9+9	0	1+1	0	3	0
Players away from the club on loan:
38	MF	(England) ENG	Macy Settle	2	0	0	0	0	0	1+1	0
40	MF	(England) ENG	Ellie Jones	2	0	0	0	0	0	1+1	0
Players who appeared for the club but left during the season:
11	MF	(England) ENG	Emma Bissell	13	1	1+9	0	0	0	3	1

== Transfers ==
=== Transfers in ===
Date	Position	Nationality	Name	From	Ref.
19 July 2024	FW	(Nigeria)	Toni Payne	(Spain) Sevilla	
19 July 2024	GK	(Portugal)	Inês Pereira	(Switzerland) Servette	
24 July 2024	MF	(Japan)	Honoka Hayashi	(England) West Ham United	
25 July 2024	FW	(England)	Melissa Lawley	(England) Liverpool	
26 July 2024	MF	(Greece)	Veatriki Sarri	(England) Brighton & Hove Albion	
29 July 2024	FW	(Spain)	Inma Gabarro	(Spain) Sevilla	
20 September 2024	MF	(Wales)	Lauren Thomas	(England) Blackburn Rovers	
20 September 2024	GK	(Canada)	Rylee Foster	(New Zealand) Wellington Phoenix	
20 December 2024	FW	(France)	Kelly Gago	(France) Nantes	
8 January 2025	MF	(Wales)	Hayley Ladd	(England) Manchester United	
2 February 2025	DF	(Norway)	Maren Mjelde	(Norway) Arna-Bjørnar	

=== Loans in ===
Date	Position	Nationality	Name	From	Until	Ref.
4 January 2025	DF	(Spain)	Martina Fernández	(Spain) Barcelona	End of season	
7 January 2025	MF	(Scotland)	Emma Watson	(England) Manchester United	End of season	
16 January 2025	FW	(France)	Louna Ribadeira	(England) Chelsea	End of season	

=== Transfers out ===
Date	Position	Nationality	Name	To	Ref.
19 June 2024	FW	(England)	Toni Duggan	Retired	
26 June 2024	FW	(England)	Eleanor Dale	(England) Sunderland	
26 June 2024	DF	(England)	Annie Wilding	(England) Sheffield United	
1 July 2024	FW	(England)	Izzy Morris	(United States) Niagara Purple Eagles	
3 July 2024	MF	(Sweden)	Hanna Bennison	(Italy) Juventus	
19 July 2024	DF	(Denmark)	Katrine Veje	(England) Crystal Palace	
4 August 2024	MF	(England)	Jess Brady	(England) Stockport County	
4 August 2024	FW	(Poland)	Aisha Nsangou	(England) Stockport County	
27 August 2024	FW	(Italy)	Martina Piemonte	(Italy) Lazio	
21 January 2025	GK	(Canada)	Rylee Foster	(England) Durham	
25 January 2025	MF	(England)	Emma Bissell	(England) Charlton Athletic	

=== Loans out ===
Date	Position	Nationality	Name	To	Until	Ref.
18 July 2024	MF	(England)	Rubie Deaville	(England) Sporting Khalsa	End of season	
19 July 2024	GK	(Portugal)	Inês Pereira	(Spain) Deportivo de La Coruña	End of season	
20 August 2024	FW	(Wales)	Emily Cole	(England) Liverpool Feds	End of season	
15 September 2024	MF	(England)	Macy Settle	(England) Blackburn Rovers	4 October 2024	
11 January 2025	DF	(England)	Issy Hobson	(England) Sheffield United	14 April 2025	
11 January 2025	MF	(England)	Ellie Jones	(England) Sheffield United	End of season	
11 January 2025	MF	(England)	Macy Settle	(England) Blackburn Rovers	End of season	
