= 2022–23 Everton F.C. (women) season =

Everton
2022–23 season
- Head coach: Brian Sørensen
- Stadium: Walton Hall Park, Liverpool
- Women's Super League: 6th
- FA Cup: Fourth round
- League Cup: Group stage
- Top goalscorer: League: Katja Snoeijs (7); All: Katja Snoeijs (8)
- Highest home attendance: 22,161 (vs. Liverpool, 24 March)
- Lowest home attendance: 584 (vs. West Ham United, 22 January)
- Average home league attendance: 2,985
Home colours	Away colours	Third colours

The 2022–23 Everton F.C. (women) season was the club's sixth consecutive campaign in the Women's Super League, the highest level of the football pyramid. Along with competing in the WSL, the club also contested two domestic cup competitions: the FA Cup and the League Cup.

On 8 April 2022, it was announced Brian Sørensen would become the Everton manager ahead of the 2022–23 season. He had been manager of Fortuna Hjørring since July 2021. Everton had seen out the previous season with an interim managerial team of Chris Roberts and Claire Ditchburn following the sacking of Jean-Luc Vasseur in February 2022.

== Squad ==
As of 1 February 2023

Note: Flags indicate national team as defined under FIFA eligibility rules; some limited exceptions apply. Players may hold more than one non-FIFA nationality.

No.	Pos.	Nation	Player
2	DF	DEN	Katrine Veje
4	DF	DEN	Rikke Sevecke
5	DF	SWE	Nathalie Björn
6	DF	ENG	Gabby George
7	MF	AUS	Clare Wheeler
8	MF	ENG	Izzy Christiansen
9	FW	ENG	Toni Duggan
10	MF	SWE	Hanna Bennison
11	FW	ENG	Jess Park (on loan from Manchester City)
12	GK	ENG	Emily Ramsey (on loan from Manchester United)
14	FW	DEN	Nicoline Sørensen
15	FW	ENG	Aggie Beever-Jones (on loan from Chelsea)
17	MF	SCO	Lucy Graham

No.	Pos.	Nation	Player
18	GK	IRL	Courtney Brosnan
20	MF	ENG	Megan Finnigan
21	DF	GER	Leonie Maier
22	MF	ITA	Aurora Galli
23	DF	DEN	Sara Holmgaard
25	FW	NED	Katja Snoeijs
27	DF	NOR	Elise Stenevik
28	MF	DEN	Karen Holmgaard
32	GK	ENG	Peyton Henderson
39	MF	ENG	Abbey Clarke
44	MF	ENG	Taylor Howarth
55	DF	ENG	Annie Wilding

== Preseason ==
13 August 2022 Friendly	Everton	2–1	(Sweden) BK Häcken	Liverpool
	Finnigan; Bennison	Report	Gejl	Stadium: Finch Farm; Attendance: Behind-closed-doors

21 August 2022 Friendly	Aston Villa	1–1	Everton	Bodymoor Heath
14:00	Turner	Report	Graham	Stadium: Bodymoor Heath; Attendance: Behind-closed-doors

28 August 2022 Friendly	Manchester United	1–0	Everton	Carrington
12:00	García 80'	Report		Stadium: Trafford Training Centre; Attendance: Behind-closed-doors

== Women's Super League ==
=== Results summary ===
Overall								Home						Away					
Pld	W	D	L	GF	GA	GD	Pts	W	D	L	GF	GA	GD	W	D	L	GF	GA	GD
22	9	3	10	29	36	−7	30	5	1	5	15	19	−4	4	2	5	14	17	−3

Last updated: 27 May 2023.
Source: FA WSL

=== Results by matchday ===
Round	1	2	3	4	5	6	7	8	9	10	11	12	13	14	15	16	17	18	19	20	21	22
Ground	A	A	H	H	A	H	H	A	A	H	H	A	H	A	H	H	A	A	A	H	H	A
Result	L	W	W	L	W	L	L	L	W	W	W	D	L	D	D	W	L	W	L	L	W	L
Position	10	4	5	5	4	6	8	8	6	5	5	5	6	6	6	6	6	6	6	6	6	6

A = Away; H = Home; W = Win; D = Draw; L = Loss

=== Results ===
11 September 2022	Everton	P–P	Leicester City	Liverpool
13:00				Stadium: Walton Hall Park
Note: The FA postponed all of the weekend's football fixtures following the death of Elizabeth II on 8 September 2022.

18 September 2022 1	West Ham United	1–0	Everton	Dagenham
15:00	Cissoko (yellow card) 43'; Evans 45'; Brynjarsdóttir (yellow card) 57'	Report		Stadium: Victoria Road; Attendance: 1,118; Referee: Lauren Impey

25 September 2022 2	Liverpool	0–3	Everton	Liverpool
18:45	Flaherty (yellow card) 76'	Report	Finnigan 9'; Park 33'; Bennison 87'; George (yellow card) 89'	Stadium: Anfield; Attendance: 27,574; Referee: Andrew Kitchen

29 September 2022 3	Everton	1–0	Leicester City	Liverpool
18:30	Graham (yellow card) 38'; Björn (yellow card) 52'; Levell 90+4' (o.g.)	Report	O'Brien (yellow card) 70'; Plumptre (yellow card) 81'; Pike (yellow card) 88'	Stadium: Walton Hall Park; Attendance: 724; Referee: Cheryl Foster
Note: Rescheduled from 11 September 2022.

16 October 2022 4	Everton	1–3	Chelsea	Liverpool
13:00	Buchanan 53' (o.g.)	Report	Harder 37', 59' (pen.); Charles 90+5'	Stadium: Walton Hall Park; Attendance: 1,668; Referee: Lauren Impey

22 October 2022 5	Aston Villa	0–1	Everton	Walsall
12:30	Corsie (yellow card) 40'	Report	Björn (yellow card) 56'; Graham 57'	Stadium: Bescot Stadium; Attendance: 1,636; Referee: Kirsty Dowle

30 October 2022 6	Everton	0–3	Manchester United	Liverpool
14:00	George (yellow card) 47'	Report	Parris 13'; Galton 55'; Ladd 68'; Blundell (yellow card) 79'	Stadium: Walton Hall Park; Attendance: 1,752; Referee: Adam Herczeg

6 November 2022	Tottenham Hotspur	P–P	Everton	Leyton
14:00				Stadium: Brisbane Road
Note: Postponed due to waterlogged pitch.

19 November 2022 7	Everton	1–2	Manchester City	Liverpool
15:00	Björn (yellow card) 35'; Sevecke 40'	Report	Blakstad 32'; Castellanos (yellow card) 38'; Shaw 49'; Kelly (yellow card) 87'	Stadium: Walton Hall Park; Attendance: 960; Referee: Emily Heaslip

3 December 2022 8	Arsenal	1–0	Everton	Borehamwood
14:00	Miedema 24'	Report	Björn (yellow card) 71'; George (yellow card) 80'	Stadium: Meadow Park; Attendance: 3,935; Referee: Sunny Gill

11 December 2022	Brighton & Hove Albion	P–P	Everton	Crawley
14:00				Stadium: Broadfield Stadium
Note: Postponed due to frozen pitch.

14 December 2022 9	Tottenham Hotspur	0–3	Everton	Leyton
19:00	Naz (yellow card) 69'; Summanen (yellow card) 87'; Neville (red card) 90'	Report	Snoeijs 8'; Park 36'; Beever-Jones (yellow card) 89'; Giovana 90+5'	Stadium: Brisbane Road; Attendance: 303; Referee: Kirsty Dowle
Note: Rescheduled from 6 November 2022.

15 January 2023 10	Everton	3–2	Reading	Liverpool
13:00	Snoeijs 9'; Park 32'; George 61'	Report	Vanhaevermaet 60'; Cooper 68'; Eikeland (yellow card) 85'	Stadium: Walton Hall Park; Attendance: 616; Referee: Tom Reeves

22 January 2023 11	Everton	3–0	West Ham United	Liverpool
14:00	K. Holmgaard 3'; Finnigan 12'; Beever-Jones 70'	Report		Stadium: Walton Hall Park; Attendance: 584; Referee: Tom Nield

5 February 2023 12	Manchester United	0–0	Everton	Leigh
12:00		Report	Jones (yellow card) 90+6'	Stadium: Leigh Sports Village; Attendance: 5,040; Referee: Emily Heaslip

5 March 2023 13	Everton	0–2	Aston Villa	Liverpool
13:00	Graham (yellow card) 90+1'	Report	Dali 5'; Finnigan 67' (o.g.); Lehmann (yellow card) 77'; Hanson (yellow card) 79'	Stadium: Walton Hall Park; Attendance: 805; Referee: Amy Fearn

12 March 2023 14	Leicester City	0–0	Everton	Leicester
15:00	Green (yellow card) 15'; Mace (yellow card) 90+3'	Report		Stadium: King Power Stadium; Attendance: 1,237; Referee: Stacey Fullicks

24 March 2023 15	Everton	1–1	Liverpool	Liverpool
19:30	George 27', (yellow card) 54'	Report	Stengel 40'; Bo Kearns (yellow card) 47'; Hinds (yellow card) 90+4'	Stadium: Goodison Park; Attendance: 22,161; Referee: Lauren Impey

2 April 2023 16	Everton	2–1	Tottenham Hotspur	Liverpool
13:00	Sørensen 4'; Beever-Jones 90+4', (yellow card) 90+7'	Report	Summanen 22'	Stadium: Walton Hall Park; Attendance: 1,542; Referee: Lisa Benn

19 April 2023 17	Brighton & Hove Albion	3–2	Everton	Crawley
19:00	Terland 12', 80'; Kullberg (yellow card) 41'; Robinson 43'; Carter (yellow card) 83'; Pattinson (yellow card) 90+5'	Report	Snoeijs 63', 83'	Stadium: Broadfield Stadium; Attendance: 2,456; Referee: Lauren Impey
Note: Rescheduled from 11 December 2022.

23 April 2023 18	Reading	2–3	Everton	Reading
14:00	Vanhaevermaet 2' (pen.), 17'; Rowe (yellow card) 45'	Report	Bennison 41'; Snoeijs 62' (pen.); Sørensen 83'	Stadium: Madejski Stadium; Attendance: 1,235; Referee: Louise Saunders

30 April 2023	Everton	P–P	Arsenal	Liverpool
				Stadium: Walton Hall Park
Note: Postponed due to Arsenal's participation in the UEFA Women's Champions League

7 May 2023 19	Chelsea	7–0	Everton	Kingston upon Thames
18:15	Reiten 12'; Kerr 25'; Harder 33', 81'; Ingle 44'; Fleming 45+2'; Cuthbert 90+2'	Report		Stadium: Kingsmeadow; Attendance: 2,074; Referee: Lisa Benn

17 May 2023 20	Everton	1–4	Arsenal	Liverpool
18:15	Holmgaard (yellow card) 10'; Beever-Jones (red card) 49'; Snoeijs 86'	Report	Foord 29', 39'; McCabe 33'; Wubben-Moy 42'	Stadium: Walton Hall Park; Attendance: 1,350; Referee: Cheryl Foster
Note: Rescheduled from 30 April 2023.

21 May 2023 21	Everton	2–1	Brighton & Hove Albion	Liverpool
13:00	Snoeijs 32'; Bennison 90+1'	Report	Sarri (yellow card) 44'; Robinson 45+1'; Connolly (yellow card) 89'	Stadium: Walton Hall Park; Attendance: 670; Referee: Lauren Impey

27 May 2023 22	Manchester City	3–2	Everton	Manchester
14:30	Shaw 51', 69'; Hemp 60'	Report	Graham 79'; Sevecke (yellow card) 89'; Clarke (yellow card) 90'; Maier 90+4'	Stadium: Academy Stadium; Attendance: 3,828; Referee: Kirsty Dowle

=== League table ===
Pos	Team	Pld	W	D	L	GF	GA	GD	Pts
4	Manchester City	22	15	2	5	50	25	+25	47
5	Aston Villa	22	11	4	7	47	37	+10	37
6	Everton	22	9	3	10	29	36	−7	30
7	Liverpool	22	6	5	11	24	39	−15	23
8	West Ham United	22	6	3	13	23	44	−21	21

Source: Women's Super League
Rules for classification: 1) Points; 2) Goal difference; 3) Number of goals scored.

== Women's FA Cup ==
As a member of the first tier, Everton entered the FA Cup in the fourth round proper.

29 January 2023 Fourth round	Everton	0–1	Birmingham City	Liverpool
13:00	Park (yellow card) 60'	Report	Bourne (yellow card) 34'; Pennock 61'; Scott (yellow card) 78'; Lu. Quinn (yellow card) 82'	Stadium: Walton Hall Park

== FA Women's League Cup ==
26 October 2022 Group stage	Everton	1–1 (4–2 p)	Aston Villa	Liverpool
18:30	Beever-Jones 62'; Bennison (yellow card) 79'	Report	Mayling (yellow card) 45+1'; Harding 49'; McLoughlin (yellow card) 54'; Corsie (yellow card) 74'	Stadium: Walton Hall Park
	Penalties
	Graham (penalty scored); Stenevik (penalty scored); Bennison (penalty scored); Galli (penalty missed); Björn (penalty scored)		(penalty scored) Mayling; (penalty missed) Patten; (penalty scored) Harding; (penalty missed) Blindkilde

26 November 2022 Group stage	Sheffield United	0–3	Everton	Scunthorpe
17:00	Hartley (yellow card) 90+6'	Report	Snoeijs (yellow card) 32', (goal) 54'; Bennison 79'; Park 87'	Stadium: Glanford Park

7 December 2022 Group stage	Manchester United	4–2	Everton	Leigh
19:00	Bøe Risa 1', 20'; Williams 12'; Moore 27'	Report	Park 25'; Bennison (yellow card) 58'; K. Holmgaard 90+2'	Stadium: Leigh Sports Village

17 December 2022 Group stage	Everton	0–1	Durham	Crosby
12:30		Report	Crosthwaite 15'; Bradley (yellow card) 84'	Stadium: Rossett Park

Pos	Team	Pld	W	WPEN	LPEN	L	GF	GA	GD	Pts	Qualification	AST	MUN	DUR	EVE	SHU
1	Aston Villa	4	2	1	1	0	5	3	+2	9	Advanced to knock-out stage	—	1–1	1–0	–	–
2	Manchester United	4	2	0	2	0	11	5	+6	8	Possible knock-out stage based on ranking	–	—	–	4–2	4–0
3	Durham	4	1	2	0	1	6	6	0	7		–	2–2	—	–	3–3
4	Everton	4	1	1	0	2	6	6	0	5		1–1	–	0–1	—	–
5	Sheffield United	4	0	0	1	3	4	12	−8	1		1–2	–	–	3–0	—

Rules for classification: 1) Points; 2) Goal difference; 3) Number of goals scored; 4) Number of wins; 5) Head-to-head record

== Squad statistics ==
=== Appearances ===
As of 27 May 2023

Starting appearances are listed first, followed by substitute appearances after the + symbol where applicable.

No.	Pos	Nat	Player	Total		WSL		FA Cup		League Cup	
No.	Pos	Nat	Player	Apps	Goals	Apps	Goals	Apps	Goals	Apps	Goals
2	DF	(Denmark) DEN	Katrine Veje	14	0	13+1	0	0	0	0	0
4	DF	(Denmark) DEN	Rikke Sevecke	22	1	17+4	1	0	0	1	0
5	DF	(Sweden) SWE	Nathalie Björn	23	0	20	0	0	0	2+1	0
6	DF	(England) ENG	Gabby George	20	2	16	2	1	0	3	0
7	MF	(Australia) AUS	Clare Wheeler	21	0	12+5	0	0+1	0	3	0
8	MF	(England) ENG	Izzy Christiansen	24	0	5+15	0	0+1	0	2+1	0
9	FW	(England) ENG	Toni Duggan	0	0	0	0	0	0	0	0
10	MF	(Sweden) SWE	Hanna Bennison	25	4	14+7	3	1	0	1+2	1
11	FW	(England) ENG	Jess Park	22	5	16+1	3	1	0	2+2	2
12	GK	(England) ENG	Emily Ramsey	9	0	8	0	0	0	1	0
14	FW	(Denmark) DEN	Nicoline Sørensen	17	2	13+2	2	1	0	0+1	0
15	FW	(England) ENG	Aggie Beever-Jones	21	1	7+9	0	1	0	4	1
17	MF	(Scotland) SCO	Lucy Graham	25	2	17+3	2	1	0	2+2	0
18	GK	(Republic of Ireland) IRL	Courtney Brosnan	18	0	14	0	1	0	3	0
20	MF	(England) ENG	Megan Finnigan	19	2	13+3	2	1	0	2	0
21	DF	(Germany) GER	Leonie Maier	13	1	0+9	1	0	0	3+1	0
22	MF	(Italy) ITA	Aurora Galli	25	0	13+7	0	1	0	2+2	0
23	DF	(Denmark) DEN	Sara Holmgaard	7	0	2+4	0	1	0	0	0
25	FW	(Netherlands) NED	Katja Snoeijs	24	8	20+1	7	0+1	0	1+1	1
27	DF	(Norway) NOR	Elise Stenevik	23	0	7+13	0	0+1	0	2	0
28	MF	(Denmark) DEN	Karen Holmgaard	24	2	15+4	1	1	0	4	1
32	GK	(England) ENG	Peyton Henderson	0	0	0	0	0	0	0	0
39	MF	(England) ENG	Abbey Clarke	2	0	0+1	0	0	0	1	0
44	MF	(England) ENG	Taylor Howarth	1	0	0	0	0	0	0+1	0
55	DF	(England) ENG	Annie Wilding	1	0	0	0	0	0	1	0
Players away from the club on loan:
24	DF	(Scotland) SCO	Kenzie Weir	4	0	0+1	0	0	0	2+1	0
Players who appeared for the club but left during the season:
19	FW	(Brazil) BRA	Gio Queiroz	11	1	0+7	1	0	0	2+2	0
30	GK	(Scotland) SCO	Eartha Cumings	0	0	0	0	0	0	0	0

== Transfers ==
=== Transfers in ===
Date	Position	Nationality	Name	From	Ref.
18 July 2022	FW	(Netherlands)	Katja Snoeijs	(France) Bordeaux	
5 August 2022	MF	(Denmark)	Karen Holmgaard	(Germany) Turbine Potsdam	
5 August 2022	DF	(Denmark)	Sara Holmgaard	(Germany) Turbine Potsdam	
9 August 2022	DF	(Denmark)	Katrine Veje	(Sweden) FC Rosengård	
7 September 2022	DF	(Norway)	Elise Stenevik	(Sweden) Eskilstuna United	
10 January 2023	MF	(Australia)	Clare Wheeler	(Denmark) Fortuna Hjørring	

=== Loans in ===
Date	Position	Nationality	Name	From	Until	Ref.
15 July 2022	FW	(England)	Jess Park	(England) Manchester City	End of season	
5 August 2022	GK	(England)	Emily Ramsey	(England) Manchester United	End of season	
19 August 2022	MF	(Australia)	Clare Wheeler	(Denmark) Fortuna Hjørring	10 January 2023	
25 August 2022	FW	(England)	Aggie Beever-Jones	(England) Chelsea	End of season	
13 September 2022	FW	(Brazil)	Gio Queiroz	(England) Arsenal	9 January 2023	
4 March 2023	GK	(Scotland)	Eartha Cumings (Note: Emergency goalkeeper loan)	(England) Liverpool	13 March 2023	

=== Transfers out ===
Date	Position	Nationality	Name	To	Ref.
8 May 2022	FW	(Scotland)	Claire Emslie	(United States) Angel City	
12 May 2022	FW	(Northern Ireland)	Simone Magill	(England) Aston Villa	
24 June 2022	DF	(England)	Danielle Turner	(England) Aston Villa	
29 June 2022	DF	(England)	Poppy Pattinson	(England) Brighton & Hove Albion	
2 July 2022	GK	(England)	Sandy MacIver	(England) Manchester City	
4 July 2022	GK	(Iceland)	Cecilía Rúnarsdóttir	(Germany) Bayern Munich	
15 July 2022	MF	(England)	Grace Clinton	(England) Manchester United	
20 July 2022	FW	(Sweden)	Anna Anvegård	(Sweden) BK Häcken	
5 August 2022	MF	(France)	Kenza Dali	(England) Aston Villa	
15 September 2022	GK	(England)	Faye Kirby	(England) Liverpool	

=== Loans out ===
Date	Position	Nationality	Name	To	Until	Ref.
5 August 2022	DF	(Denmark)	Sara Holmgaard	(Denmark) Fortuna Hjørring	13 January 2023	
1 February 2023	DF	(Scotland)	Kenzie Weir	(England) Lewes	End of season	
