= Elise Stenevik =

Norwegian footballer (born 1999)

Personal information
- Full name: Elise Isolde Stenevik
- Date of birth: 9 September 1999 (age 27)
- Place of birth: Florø, Norway
- Height: 1.74 m (5 ft 9 in)
- Position: Left-back

Team information
- Current team: 1. FC Köln
- Number: 24

Youth career
- Florø
- 2015: Arna-Bjørnar

Senior career*
Years	Team	Apps	(Gls)
- Florø
2016–2019	Arna-Bjørnar	72	(1)
2020–2022	Eskilstuna United	57	(3)
2022–2026	Everton	51	(1)
2026–	1. FC Köln	0	(0)

International career
2015	Norway U16	10	(1)
2016	Norway U17	12	(7)
2017–2018	Norway U19	13	(0)
2019–2024	Norway U23	19	(1)
- * Club domestic league appearances and goals as of 15:02, 19 May 2026 (UTC)

Elise Isolde Stenevik (Norwegian: [ɛˈlìːsə ɪˈsɔ̀ɫdə ˈstêːnəˌviːk]; born 9 September 1999) is a Norwegian professional footballer who plays as a left-back for Frauen-Bundesliga club 1. FC Köln.

She has previously played Damallsvenskan football for Eskilstuna United and Toppserien football for Arna-Bjørnar, as well as for Everton in the Women's Super League.

== Career ==
Stenevik is a prolific Norway youth international and has played for Florø, Arna-Bjørnar and Eskilstuna United.

In September 2022, Stenevik signed a two-year deal with Everton. On 24 May 2024, she signed a new two year contract. On 6 October 2024, Stenevik was subbed off at half-time after suffering a tendon hamstring injury that will keep her out until around Christmas. On 26 June 2026, it was announced that she would leave Everton when her contract expired.

On 24 May 2026, Stenevik was announced at 1. FC Köln.

== Career statistics ==
As of match played 16 May 2026

Appearances and goals by club, season and competition
Club	Season	League			National cup (Note: Includes Norwegian Women's Cup, Svenska Cupen, Women's FA Cup)		League cup (Note: Includes Women's League Cup)		Total	
Club	Season	Division	Apps	Goals	Apps	Goals	Apps	Goals	Apps	Goals
Arna-Bjørnar	2016	Toppserien	13	0	2	0	—		15	0
Arna-Bjørnar	2017	Toppserien	20	0	3	0	—		23	0
Arna-Bjørnar	2018	Toppserien	20	0	3	0	—		23	0
Arna-Bjørnar	2019	Toppserien	19	1	4	1	—		23	2
Arna-Bjørnar	Total		72	1	12	1	0	0	84	2
Eskilstuna United	2020	Damallsvenskan	18	0	4	0	—		22	0
Eskilstuna United	2021	Damallsvenskan	21	1	5	0	—		26	1
Eskilstuna United	2022	Damallsvenskan	18	2	0	0	—		18	2
Eskilstuna United	Total		57	3	9	0	0	0	66	2
Everton	2022–23	Women's Super League	20	0	1	0	2	0	23	0
Everton	2023–24	Women's Super League	11	1	3	0	1	0	15	1
Everton	2024–25	Women's Super League	13	0	1	0	1	0	15	0
Everton	2025–26	Women's Super League	7	0	0	0	2	0	9	0
Everton	Total		51	1	5	0	6	0	62	1
1. FC Köln	2026–27	Frauen-Bundesliga	0	0	0	0	0	—		0
Career total			180	5	26	1	6	0	212	6
