= Kathrine Møller Kühl =

Danish footballer (born 2003)

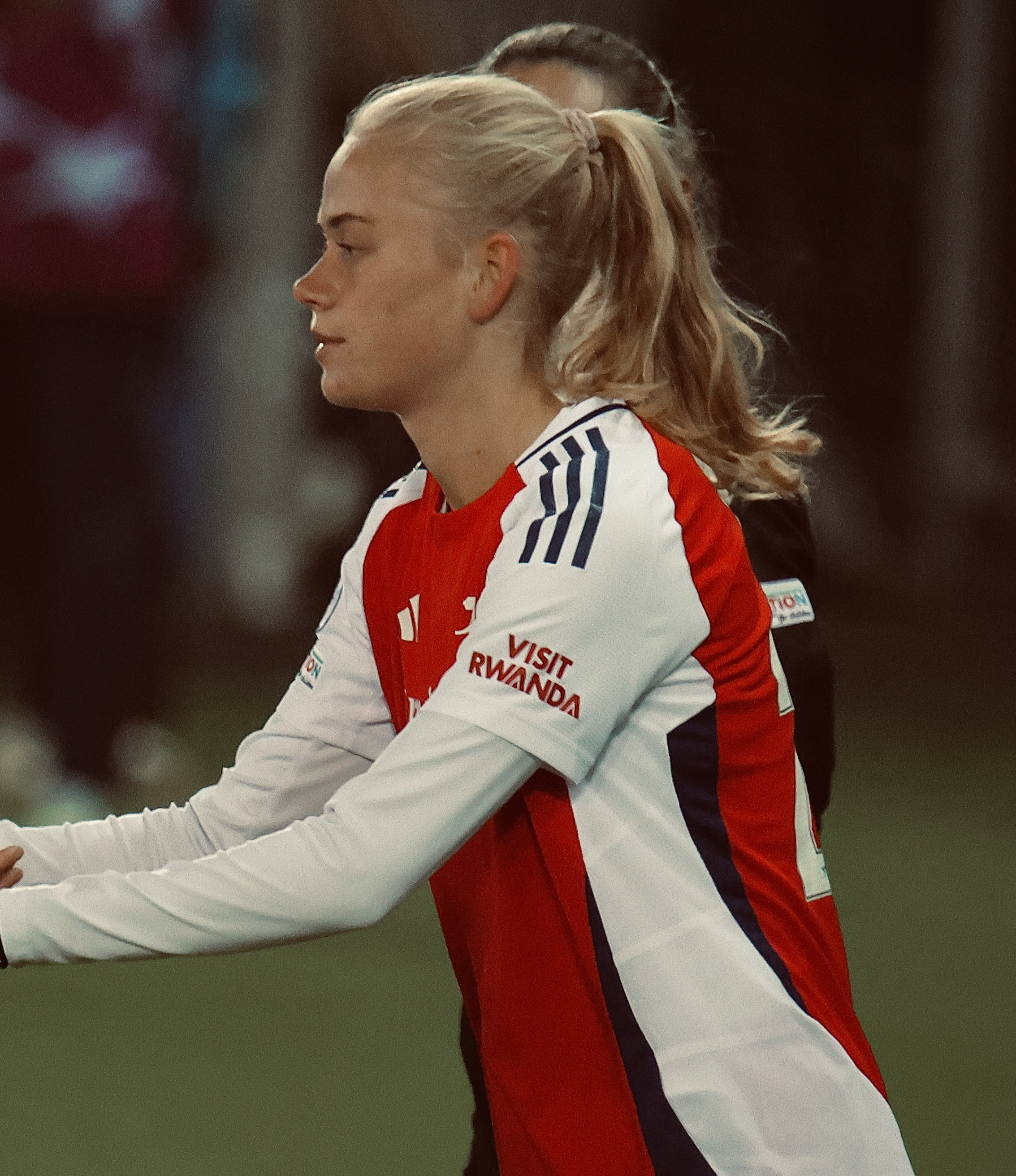
- Møller Kühl with Arsenal in 2024

Personal information
- Date of birth: 5 July 2003 (age 23)
- Place of birth: Hillerød, Denmark
- Height: 1.72 m (5 ft 8 in)
- Position: Defensive midfielder

Team information
- Current team: Atlético Madrid
- Number: 12

Youth career
- 2008–2017: Hillerød Fodbold
- 2018–2020: Nordsjælland

Senior career*
| Years | Team | Apps | (Gls) |
| 2019–2023 | Nordsjælland | 71 | (7) |
| 2023–2025 | Arsenal | 14 | (0) |
| 2024 | → Everton (loan) | 10 | (1) |
| 2025–2026 | AS Roma | 16 | (1) |
| 2026– | Atlético Madrid | | |

International career^{‡}
| 2018 | Denmark U16 | 2 | (0) |
| 2019 | Denmark U17 | 14 | (2) |
| 2020 | Denmark U19 | 3 | (0) |
| 2021– | Denmark | 55 | (3) |
- * Club domestic league appearances and goals as of 27 December 2025 ‡ National team caps and goals as of 18 April 2026

Kathrine Møller Kühl (Danish: [ˈkʰaːtʁə.nə ˈmœlˀɐ], German: [kyːl]; born 5 July 2003) is a Danish professional footballer who plays as a defensive midfielder for Atlético Madrid and the Denmark national team. She won her first senior international cap in 2021.

== Club career ==
Møller Kühl joined Hillerød Fodbold at five years old, and remained with the club for nine years. She joined FC Nordsjælland in 2018. She made her debut against FC Thy-Thisted Q, and she has since been a regular part of the team's starting line-up. In July 2020, she was named Cup Fighter of the Year when FC Nordsjælland won the 2019–20 Danish Cup. After the match, she was highly praised by several media outlets for her good performance and was also compared to the Danish national team star Pernille Harder. The same season she also helped win bronze for the team, in the club's first season in the league.

Arsenal announced the signing of Møller Kühl on 7 January 2023. On 26 January, she made her Arsenal debut, coming off the bench in the 67th minute in the FA Women's League Cup quarterfinal game against Aston Villa.

Arsenal announced her loan to Everton on 13 January 2024 until the end of the 2023–24 season. She made her debut on the same day in the 3–0 victory over Aston Villa in the FA Cup, coming on as a substitute for Karoline Olesen in the 70th minute. She scored her first goal for the club against Nottingham Forest in the FA Cup, opening scoring in the 7–1 victory and assisting a goal.

On 18 January 2025, Møller Kühl was announced at AS Roma on a two-year contract, with the option of a further year.

== International career ==
Her first call-up to the U/17 national team was on 28 February 2019, against Norway in Silkeborg. Her team won 5–2. She substituted in the 46th minute as a replacement for Sofie Bredgaard. She took part in the 2019 U/17 European Championship in Bulgaria, where the team did not progress from the group stage. Kühl officially played two games at the tournament. She has officially played 19 U-national matches, most recently in March 2020.

In March 2021, she was selected by national coach Lars Søndergaard for the senior national team for a friendly match against Wales, in a 1–1 friendly draw at Cardiff City Stadium. She was an 81st-minute substitute for Emma Snerle. She was in the squad for the subsequent friendlies, where she also started in the starting line-up, in Denmark's 3–2 win over Australia.

She was part of the Denmark team at the 2023 World Cup. She was the youngest player in the squad. She finished in the top 10 for distance covered, dribbles, and tackles in the tournament.

== International goals ==
| No. | Date | Venue | Opponent | Score | Result | Competition |
|---|---|---|---|---|---|---|
| 1. | 25 November 2021 | Bosnia and Herzegovina FA Training Centre, Zenica, Bosnia & Herzegovina | Bosnia and Herzegovina | 1–0 | 3–0 | 2023 FIFA Women's World Cup qualification |
| 2. | 25 October 2024 | Aalborg Stadium, Aalborg, Denmark | South Africa | 5–0 | 5–0 | Friendly |
| 3. | 28 October 2025 | Parken, Copenhagen, Denmark | Finland | 1–0 | 2–0 | 2025 UEFA Women's Nations League play-off matches |

== Honours ==
Nordsjælland

- Danish Women's Cup: 2019–20

Arsenal

- FA Women's League Cup: 2022–23
