= Emma Bissell =

English footballer (born 2001)

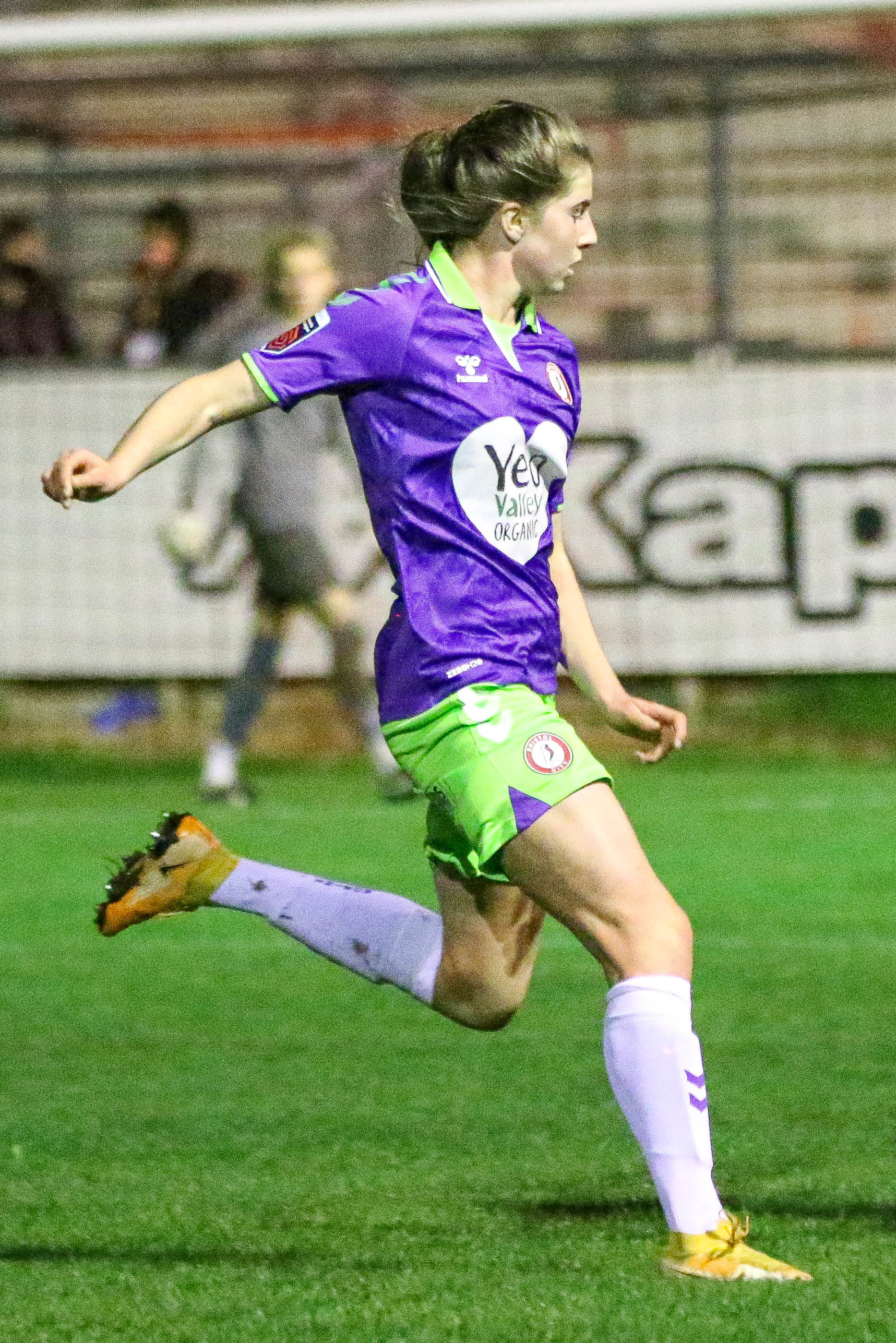

Personal information
- Full name: Emma Sophie Bissell
- Date of birth: 21 December 2001 (age 24)
- Place of birth: Chester, England,
- Height: 1.70 m (5 ft 7 in)
- Position: Midfielder

Youth career
- –2018: Manchester City

College career
Years	Team	Apps	(Gls)
2021–2022	Florida State Seminoles	44	(4)

Senior career*
Years	Team	Apps	(Gls)
2018–2020	Manchester City	0	(0)
2020–2021	Bristol City	18	(1)
2023–2025	Everton	32	(1)
2025–2026	Charlton Athletic	0+	(0+)
2026–	Bristol City	0	(0)

International career
2020	England U19	3	(0)
- * Club domestic league appearances and goals as of 00:30, 26 January 2025 (UTC)

Emma Sophie Bissell (born 21 December 2001) is an English professional footballer who plays as a midfielder for Women's Championship club Bristol City.

== Club career ==
Having come up through Manchester City's academy system, Emma Bissell was given her first team debut when she was brought on as a substitute for Janine Beckie in a FA WSL Cup match against Aston Villa on 13 December 2018.

On 19 August 2020, Bristol City announced the signing of Bissell from Manchester City on undisclosed terms. On 6 December 2020, Bissell scored her first league goal in a 1–1 draw with Reading.

On 2 August 2023, Everton announced the signing of Bissell from American college side Florida State Seminoles on a 2 years deal for an undisclosed fee. She scored her first league goal against Bristol City on 18 May 2024.

Bissell signed for Charlton Athletic on an 18-month deal on 25 January 2025.

On 23 July 2026, Bissell was announced at Bristol City.

== Career statistics ==
=== Club ===
As of match played 15 December 2024

Club	Season	League			FA Cup		League Cup		Continental		Total	
Club	Season	Division	Apps	Goals	Apps	Goals	Apps	Goals	Apps	Goals	Apps	Goals
Manchester City	2018–19	Women's Super League	0	0	0	0	1	0	0	0	1	0
Manchester City	2019–20	Women's Super League	0	0	1	0	1	0	0	0	2	0
Manchester City	Total		0	0	1	0	2	0	0	0	3	0
Bristol City	2020–21	Women's Super League	17	1	1	0	5	2	—		23	3
Everton	2023–24	Women's Super League	22	1	3	1	4	0	—		29	2
Everton	2024–25	Women's Super League	10	0	—		3	1	—		13	1
Everton	Total		32	1	3	1	7	1	0	0	42	3
Charlton Athletic	2024–25	Women's Championship	0	0	—		—		—		0	0
Career total			49	2	5	1	14	3	0	0	68	6

== Honours ==
Florida State Seminoles

- NCAA Division I Women's Soccer Championship: 2021
