= Courtney Brosnan =

Irish footballer (born 1995)

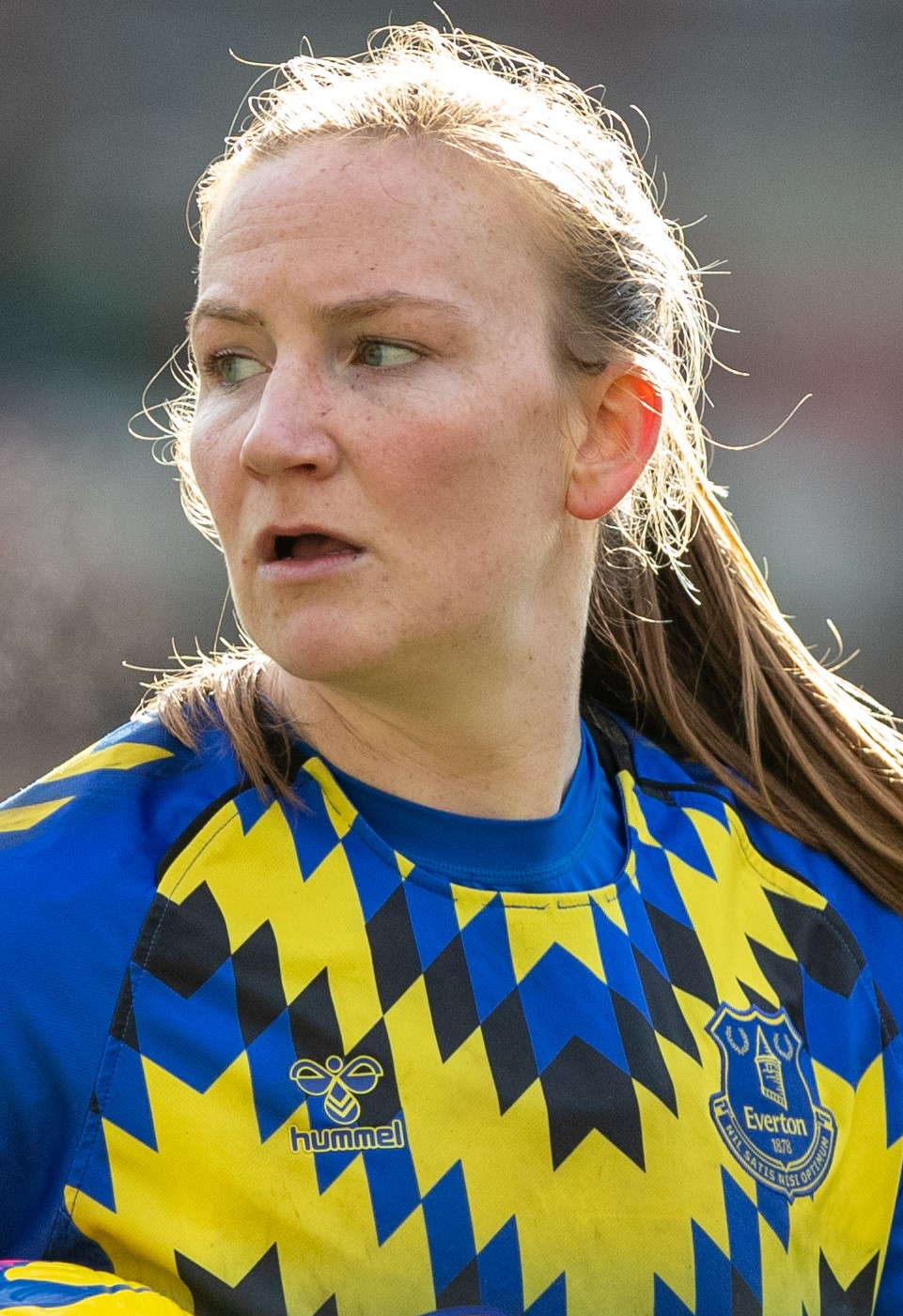
- Brosnan with Everton in 2023.

Personal information
- Full name: Courtney Elizabeth Brosnan
- Date of birth: 10 November 1995 (age 31)
- Place of birth: Millburn, New Jersey, U.S.
- Height: 1.75 m (5 ft 9 in)
- Position: Goalkeeper

Team information
- Current team: Everton
- Number: 1

College career
Years	Team	Apps	(Gls)
2014–2017	Syracuse Orange	67	(0)

Senior career*
Years	Team	Apps	(Gls)
2017–2018	Ambilly	11	(0)
2018–2019	Le Havre	21	(0)
2019–2021	West Ham United	16	(0)
2021–	Everton	77	(0)

International career^{‡}
2011–2012	Republic of Ireland U17	2	(0)
2012–2014	Republic of Ireland U19	4	(0)
2017–2018	United States U23		
2020–	Republic of Ireland	59	(0)
- * Club domestic league appearances and goals as of 04:56, 15 September 2026 (UTC) ‡ National team caps and goals as of 16:00, 18 October 2026 (UTC)

Courtney Elizabeth Brosnan (born 10 November 1995) is a professional footballer who plays as a goalkeeper for Women's Super League club Everton. Born in the United States, she represents the Republic of Ireland at international level.

== Club career ==
Raised in the Short Hills section of Millburn, New Jersey, Brosnan attended Millburn High School before moving on to Syracuse University to play for the Syracuse Orange women's soccer team.

At the end of her time at Syracuse, Brosnan was the program's all-time saves leader (344) and 8 shutouts ranked third on the all-time list.

=== West Ham United ===
Brosnan was announced at West Ham on 9 August 2019, taking the number 18 shirt. She made her league debut against Arsenal on 8 September 2019.

On 21 May 2021, Brosnan was released from her contract by West Ham United.

=== Everton ===
Brosnan was announced at Everton on 26 July 2021. She made her league debut against Tottenham on 19 December 2021. Brosnan was rotated with Emily Ramsey in her first two seasons at the club. Brosnan's contract was renewed in 2022. Along with Dwight McNeil, Brosnan was named as an Everton PFA Community Champion for 2022/23. Her contract was extended for a further two years on 28 June 2024. On 13 February 2026, Brosnan signed a two and a half year contract with the club.

== International career ==
Born in the US and of Irish descent, she was available to represent the Republic of Ireland or the US, but ultimately chose to represent Ireland.

On 11 October 2022, Brosnan saved a penalty in the Republic of Ireland's World Cup Qualifier play-off against Scotland, which her team eventually won 1–0 and qualified for the 2023 FIFA Women's World Cup.

On 31 July 2023, Brosnan made a point-blank save that was described as 'world class' against Nigeria.

In 2023, Brosnan won the Player of the Year award for her performances, becoming the first goalkeeper to win it since Emma Byrne in 2012.

== Career statistics ==
=== Club ===
As of match played 13 September 2026

Appearances and goals by club, season and competition
Club	Season	League			National cup (Note: Includes Coupe de France Féminine, Women's FA Cup)		League cup (Note: Includes Women's League Cup)		Total	
Club	Season	Division	Apps	Goals	Apps	Goals	Apps	Goals	Apps	Goals
Ambilly	2017–18	Division 2 Féminine	11	0	0	0	—		11	0
Le Havre	2018–19	Division 2 Féminine	21	0	2	0	—		23	0
West Ham United	2019–20	Women's Super League	10	0	1	0	1	0	12	0
West Ham United	2020–21	Women's Super League	6	0	0	0	2	0	8	0
West Ham United	Total		16	0	1	0	3	0	20	0
Everton	2021–22	Women's Super League	4	0	1	0	3	0	8	0
Everton	2022–23	Women's Super League	14	0	1	0	3	0	18	0
Everton	2023–24	Women's Super League	20	0	3	0	3	0	26	0
Everton	2024–25	Women's Super League	21	0	1	0	2	0	24	0
Everton	2025–26	Women's Super League	16	0	1	0	1	0	18	0
Everton	2026–27	Women's Super League	2	0	0	0	0	0	2	0
Everton	Total		77	0	7	0	12	0	96	0
Career total			125	0	10	0	15	0	150	0

=== International ===
As of match played 13 October 2026

Appearances and goals by national team and year
National team	Year	Apps	Goals
Republic of Ireland	2020	5	0
Republic of Ireland	2021	8	0
Republic of Ireland	2022	8	0
Republic of Ireland	2023	11	0
Republic of Ireland	2024	11	0
Republic of Ireland	2025	8	0
Republic of Ireland	2026	7	0
Total		59	0

== Honours ==
Individual

- Everton PFA Community Champion: 2021–22, 2022–23
- FAI Senior Women's International Player of the Year: 2022 2023
- PFA Ireland International Women's Player of the Year: 2022 2024
- Everton Players' Player of the Season: 2023–24 2025–26
- Everton Player of the Season: 2025–26
