= Kelly Gago =

French footballer (born 1999)

- Gago in 2026

Personal information
- Full name: Odette Kelly Gago
- Date of birth: 5 January 1999 (age 27)
- Place of birth: Créteil, France
- Height: 1.78 m (5 ft 10 in)
- Position: Forward

Team information
- Current team: West Ham United
- Number: 11

Youth career
- 2010-2012: CSM Bonneuil
- 2012-2014: FCF Juvisy
- 2014-2015: VGA Saint-Maur

Senior career*
Years	Team	Apps	(Gls)
2015	VGA Saint-Maur	4	(0)
2016	Dijon FCO	6	(2)
2016-2022	AS Saint-Étienne	81	(44)
2022-2023	UC Sampdoria	15	(3)
2023-2024	Parma Calcio	28	(14)
2024	FC Nantes	10	(2)
2024–2026	Everton	25	(8)
2026–	West Ham United	2	(1)

International career^{‡}
2018	France U19	3	(0)
2018	France U20	7	(3)
2019–2024	France U23	3	(1)
2024–	France	15	(4)
- * Club domestic league appearances and goals as of 15:45, 15 September 2026 (UTC) ‡ National team caps and goals as of 10 October 2026 (UTC)

Odette Kelly Gago (French: [kɛli ɡaɡo]; born 5 January 1999) is a French professional footballer who plays as a striker for Women's Super League club West Ham United and the France national team. Gago has previously played for Sampdoria.

== Club career ==
Gago started her youth career at CSM Bonneuil (2010–2012), followed by spells at FCF Juvisy (2012–2014) and VGA Saint-Maur (2014–2015). In 2015 She made her senior debut with VGA Saint-Maur and had four appearances. She then played for Dijon FCO in 2016, scoring two goals in six matches. From 2016 to 2022, Gago played for AS Saint-Étienne, where she had a prolific record of 44 goals in 88 appearances. She subsequently joined UC Sampdoria (2022–2023), then moved to Parma Calcio (2023–2024), and then FC Nantes in 2024. During her time at FC Nantes, Gago played a total of ten games, starting nine, scoring two goals, and providing one assist.

In December 2024, Women's Super League club Everton announced the signing of Gago from FC Nantes. Having scored five goals for the club between 1 January 2025 and the end of the season, she signed a three-year contract extension to remain at Everton until June 2028.

On 17 July 2026, Gago joined West Ham United on a three year contract.

== International career ==
Kelly Gago made her debut for France against Jamaica. In her second appearance for France, she scored against Switzerland.

== Style of play ==
Standing at 1.78 meters, Gago is known for her physical presence and goal-scoring abilities.

== Career statistics ==
=== Club ===
As of match played 12 September 2026

Appearances and goals by club, season and competition
Club	Season	League			National cup (Note: Includes Coupe de France Féminine, Coppa Italia, Women's FA Cup)		League cup (Note: Includes Women's League Cup)		Total	
Club	Season	Division	Apps	Goals	Apps	Goals	Apps	Goals	Apps	Goals
VGA Saint-Maur	2015–16	D1 Féminine	4	0	0	0	—		4	0
Dijon FCO	2015–16	D2 Féminine	6	2	0	0	—		6	2
AS Saint-Étienne	2016–17	D1 Féminine	9	0	2	0	—		11	0
AS Saint-Étienne	2017–18	D2 Féminine	15	7	4	0	—		19	7
AS Saint-Étienne	2018–19	D2 Féminine	23	20	0	0	—		23	20
AS Saint-Étienne	2019–20	D2 Féminine	10	7	3	3	—		13	10
AS Saint-Étienne	2020–21	D2 Féminine	6	2	0	0	—		6	2
AS Saint-Étienne	2021–22	D1 Féminine	18	5	1	0	—		19	5
AS Saint-Étienne	Total		81	41	10	3	0	0	91	44
UC Sampdoria	2022–23	Serie A	15	3	2	0	—		17	3
Parma Calcio	2023–24	Serie B	28	14	2	1	—		30	15
FC Nantes	2024–25	Première Ligue	10	2	0	0	—		10	2
Everton	2024–25	Women's Super League	10	4	2	1	0	0	12	5
Everton	2025–26	Women's Super League	15	4	1	0	2	1	18	5
Everton	Total		25	8	3	1	2	1	30	10
West Ham United	2026–27	Women's Super League	2	1					2	1
Career total			171	71	17	5	2	1	190	77

=== International ===
As of match played 10 October 2026

Appearances and goals by national team and year
National team	Year	Apps	Goals
France	2024	2	1
France	2025	8	2
France	2026	5	1
Total		15	4

Scores and results list France's goal tally first, score column indicates score after each Gago goal.

List of international goals scored by Kelly Gago
No.	Date	Venue	Opponent	Score	Result	Competition
1	29 October 2024	Stade de Genève, Geneva, Switzerland	Switzerland	1–1	1–2	Friendly
2	20 June 2025	Stade du Hainaut, Valenciennes, France	Belgium	1–0	5–0	Friendly
3	2 December 2025	Nationalarenan, Solna, Sweden	Sweden	2–2	2–2 (a.e.t.)	2025 UEFA Women's Nations League Finals
4	10 October 2026	Stade Francis Le Basser, Laval, France	Latvia	7–0	9–0	Friendly
