= Megan Finnigan =

English footballer (born 1998)

Personal information
- Full name: Megan Finnigan
- Date of birth: 2 April 1998 (age 28)
- Place of birth: Blackpool, Lancashire, England
- Height: 1.75 m (5 ft 9 in)
- Positions: Midfielder; centre back

Team information
- Current team: Everton
- Number: 20

Youth career
- Everton

Senior career*
Years	Team	Apps	(Gls)
2015–	Everton	132	(8)

International career^{‡}
2015–2016	England U17	9	(0)
2016–2017	England U19	10	(1)
2018–	England U20	7	(0)
2019–	England U21	10	(2)
- * Club domestic league appearances and goals as of 14:58, 19 May 2026 (UTC) ‡ National team caps and goals as of 17 January 2020

Megan Finnigan (born 2 April 1998) is an English professional footballer who plays as a centre back for Women's Super League club Everton, who she also captains.

== Club career ==
=== Everton ===
Finnigan began her youth career with Everton's academy at the age of nine. She remained with the club throughout her youth career and captained the team in the 2014 FA Women's Youth Cup final.

Finnigan made her Everton first team debut in 2015, making 6 total appearances that season. She signed her first professional contract with the Blues in July 2017.

On 27 September 2023, Finnigan was named club captain of Everton ahead of the 2023–24 season.

On 31 January 2025, it was confirmed Finnigan had suffered an Anterior cruciate ligament injury (ACL) and would be out for the remainder of the season. In October 2025 Everton manager Brian Sorensen told press that Finnigan required an operation and would not be available for selection until 2026.

On 13 July 2026, the club announced that Finnigan had signed a new one year contract with the club, taking her stay to over 20 years with the Toffees.

== International career ==
Finnigan has made appearances for England from U17 through to U20 level. Having captained the U-19s during the 2017 European Championships, she was a member of the U20 squad which claimed bronze at the 2018 FIFA U-20 Women's World Cup.

== Personal life ==
Finnigan attended Winstanley College in Wigan, where she achieved A grades in English language, history, and geography A-Levels. She started studying for a degree in geography at the University of Liverpool, but ultimately decided to give it up to focus on her football career.

== Career statistics ==
=== Club ===
As of match played 16 May 2026

Appearances and goals by club, season and competition
Club	Season	League			FA cup		League cup (Note: includes Women's League Cup)		Total	
Club	Season	Division	Apps	Goals	Apps	Goals	Apps	Goals	Apps	Goals
Everton	2015	Women's Super League 2	3	0	0	0	3	0	6	0
Everton	2016	Women's Super League 2	16	0	2	0	1	0	19	0
Everton	2017	Women's Super League 2	8	0	—		—		8	0
Everton	2017–18	Women's Super League	16	0	2	0	4	0	22	0
Everton	2018–19	Women's Super League	19	0	1	0	3	0	23	0
Everton	2019–20	Women's Super League	10	0	5	0	3	0	18	0
Everton	2020–21	Women's Super League	22	2	2	0	3	0	27	2
Everton	2021–22	Women's Super League	16	1	3	0	2	0	21	1
Everton	2022–23	Women's Super League	16	2	1	0	2	0	19	2
Everton	2023–24	Women's Super League	21	3	3	0	3	0	27	3
Everton	2024–25	Women's Super League	12	0	1	0	2	0	15	0
Everton	2025–26	Women's Super League	0	0	0	0	0	0	0	0
Career total			159	8	20	0	26	0	205	8

== Honours ==
England U20s

- FIFA U-20 Women's World Cup third place: 2018
