= Emily Ramsey =

English footballer (born 2000)

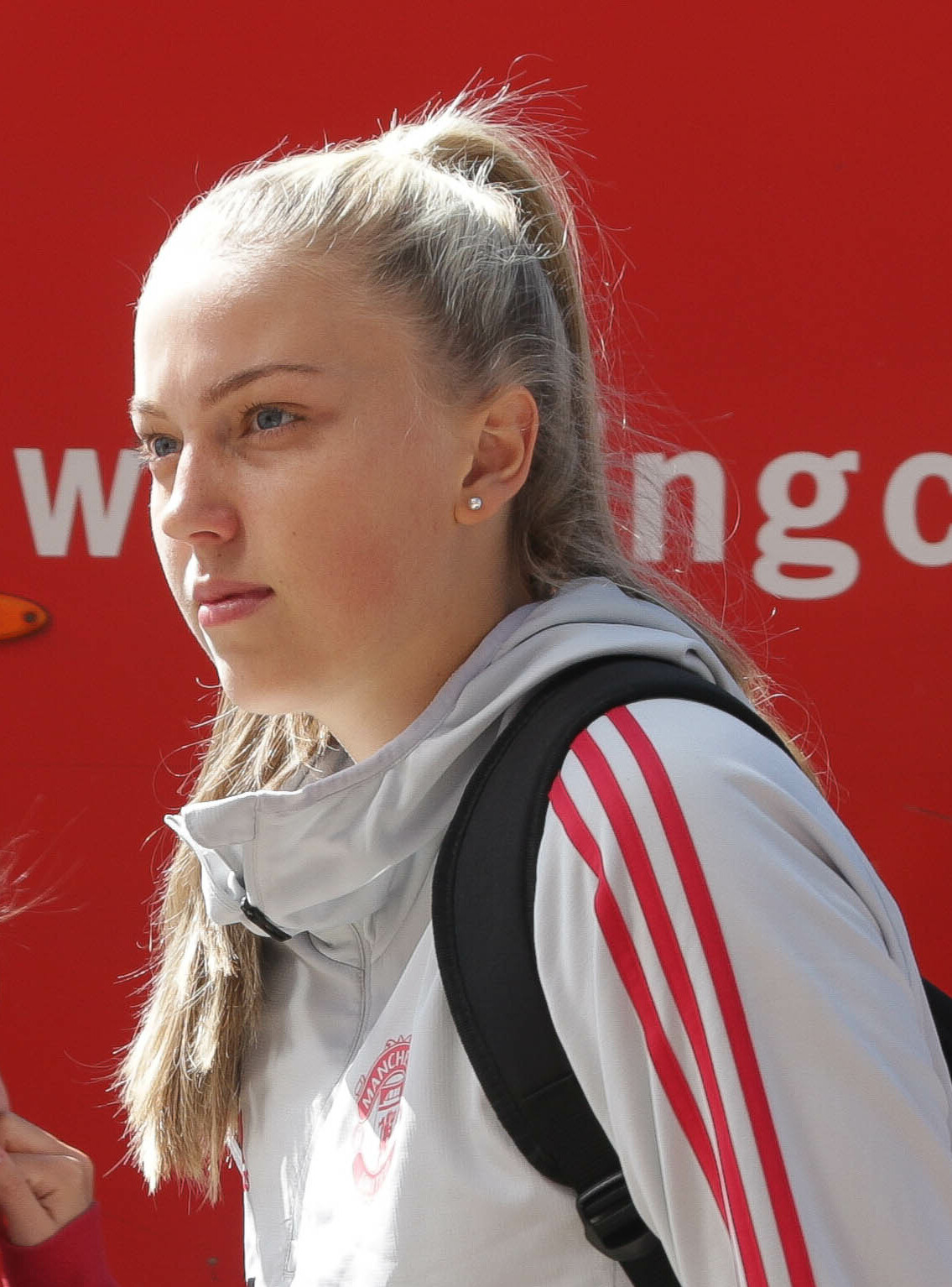
- Ramsey in 2019

Personal information
- Full name: Emily Jo Ramsey
- Date of birth: 16 November 2000 (age 25)
- Place of birth: Salford, England
- Height: 5 ft 11 in (1.80 m)
- Position: Goalkeeper

Team information
- Current team: Aston Villa
- Number: 1

Youth career
- 2010–2017: Manchester United

Senior career*
Years	Team	Apps	(Gls)
2017–2018	Liverpool	0	(0)
2018–2023	Manchester United	2	(0)
2020	→ Sheffield United (loan)	1	(0)
2021	→ West Ham United (loan)	0	(0)
2021–2022	→ Birmingham City (loan)	15	(0)
2022–2023	→ Everton (loan)	8	(0)
2023–2026	Everton	9	(0)
2026–	Aston Villa	0	(0)

International career^{‡}
2016–2017	England U17	3	(0)
2017–2019	England U19	10	(0)
2020	England U21	2	(0)
2023–2024	England U23	6	(0)
2023–	England	0	(0)
- * Club domestic league appearances and goals as of 14:52, 19 May 2026 (UTC) ‡ National team caps and goals as of 8 February 2024

Emily Jo Ramsey (born 16 November 2000) is an English professional footballer who plays as a goalkeeper for WSL club Aston Villa. She has represented England from under-17 to under-23 youth level. She began her senior career at Liverpool, followed by playing for Manchester United, with loan spells at Sheffield United, West Ham United, Birmingham City, and Everton, later joining Everton on a permanent deal.

== Club career ==
=== Youth career ===
Ramsey was born in Salford and played youth football at Deans Youth and Ladies FC in Eccles aged 7. A year later, she was offered a scholarship at Manchester United's Centre of Excellence, but decided to stay with DYLFC for another season and was awarded the Schofield Cup as the best player across the club's 24 squads in all age groups, an award previously won by Ryan Giggs. In 2010, she eventually made the switch to Manchester United.

=== Liverpool ===
As Manchester United did not have a senior women's team, Ramsey signed with Liverpool in 2017 where she would develop under the tutelage of England international goalkeeper Siobhan Chamberlain. On 18 February 2018, Ramsey made her debut in a 3–0 FA Women's Cup Fifth round win against Chichester City.

=== Manchester United ===
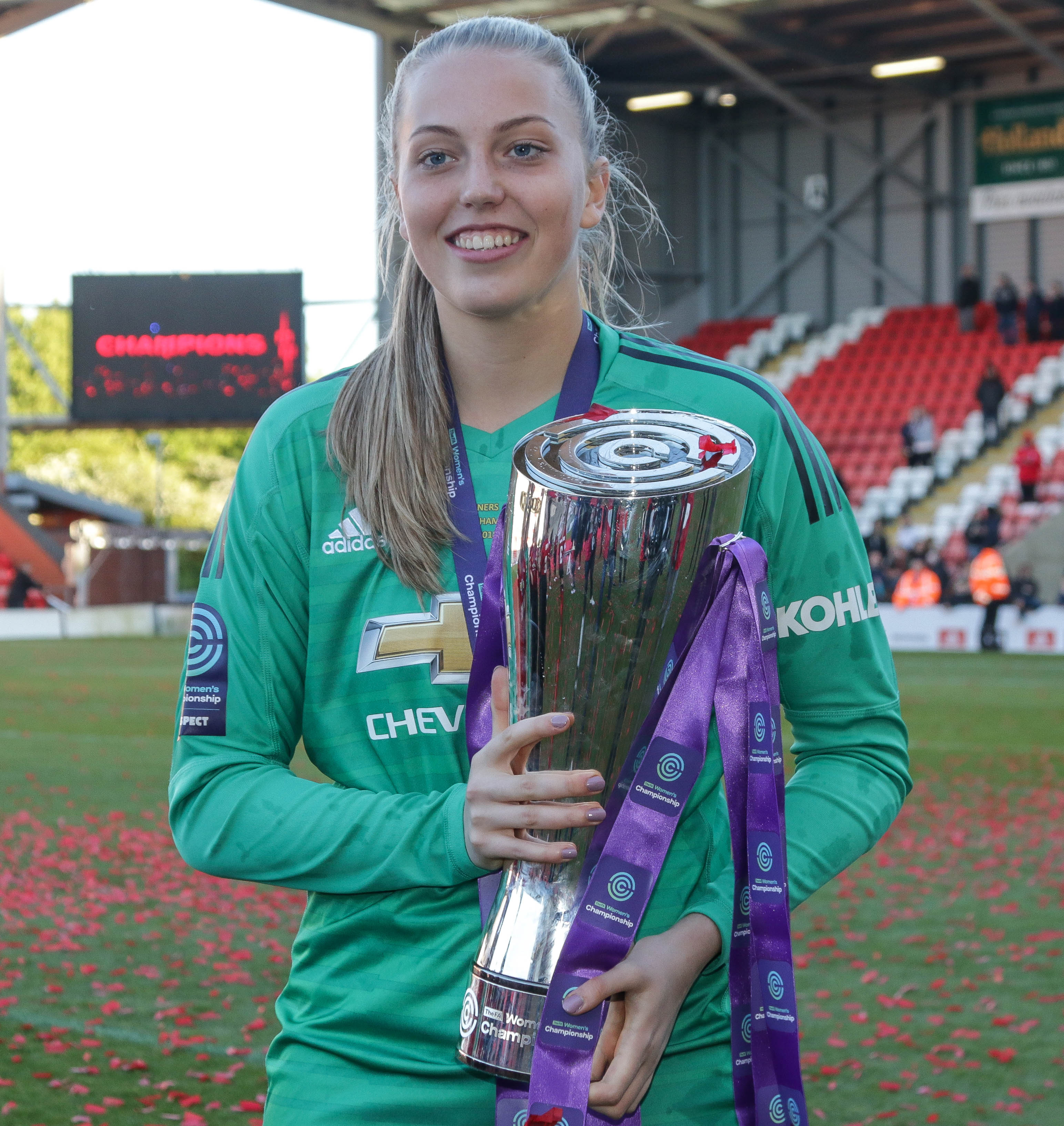
Ramsey for Manchester United holding the league trophy after winning the Championship, 11 May 2019.

After spending a year at Liverpool, Ramsey was one of seven former Centre of Excellence graduates to return to Manchester United for their inaugural season. She was also joined by former Liverpool teammate Chamberlain. On 17 February 2019, she made her professional debut as a 64th minute substitute for Chamberlain in an FA Cup fifth round game against London Bees, with the score at 2–0. Manchester United won the match 3–0. She made her first league appearance for the club in a 5–0 away win against Millwall Lionesses on 28 April.

Ramsey missed the start of the 2019–20 season after suffering an elbow injury in training. On 11 December 2019, Ramsey made her first appearance of the season in a League Cup group stage win over Birmingham City. On 24 January 2020, Ramsey signed a new contract with Manchester United and joined Sheffield United in the FA Women's Championship on loan for the rest of the season. The loan was ultimately cut short due to the suspension and eventual cancellation of the remainder of the season during the coronavirus pandemic. Ramsey had played in both games she was available for prior to the season ending, making her debut for the club on 26 January 2020 in a 3–0 FA Cup defeat to Birmingham City before starting in a 5–1 league victory over Blackburn Rovers.

During the 2020–21 season, Ramsey was handed League Cup group stage starts in a 3–1 defeat to Liverpool and a 0–0 draw with Manchester City, which ended in a penalty shoot-out after 90 minutes with Ramsey saving Laura Coombs' penalty as United won the bonus point 4–3.

On 7 March 2021 she joined West Ham United on an emergency loan after first choice keeper Mackenzie Arnold sustained a knee injury. After backing up Courtney Brosnan in the league, Ramsey made her West Ham debut on 18 April starting in an 11–0 victory over third-division side Chichester & Selsey in the FA Cup fourth round. It was her fourth career FA Cup appearance for her fourth different team. On 24 April, Ramsey was recalled from the loan following Arnold's recovery from injury.

On 6 August 2021, Ramsey signed a new two-year contract with Manchester United before joining Birmingham City on a season-long loan.

On 5 August 2022, Ramsey joined WSL side Everton on loan for the season.

On 4 July 2023, Manchester United confirmed Ramsey's departure from the club.

=== Everton ===
On 29 July 2023, Ramsey joined Everton permanently on a three-year deal. On 26 June 2026, it was announced that she would leave Everton when her contract expired.

=== Aston Villa ===
On 15 July 2026, Ramsey signed for Aston Villa on a free transfer.

== International career ==
=== Youth ===
Ramsey has been capped by England at under-17, under-19 and under-21 level.

In 2017, she travelled to the Czech Republic to compete in the UEFA Women's Under-17 Championship. In 2018, Ramsey was part of the England squad that won bronze medal at the FIFA U-20 World Cup in France, however, she was an unused substitute in all the fixtures. In 2018, she featured in England's 2018 UEFA Women's Under-19 Championship qualification campaign as the team lost out to Germany in the Elite round. Later in the year, Ramsey also played in the 2019 Under-19 qualification campaign.

In July 2019, Ramsey was named in the England squad for the 2019 UEFA Under-19 Championship in Scotland. Ramsey played in the final game of the group stage in a 1–0 win against Germany as England were knocked out in the group stages.

In March 2020, Ramsey was called up to the under-21 squad for a double-header of friendlies against France, keeping a clean sheet in both.

=== Senior ===
In June 2021, Ramsey was called up to a senior England training camp for the first time as an injury replacement for Karen Bardsley. In February 2023, she was named in the squad for the 2023 Arnold Clark Cup.

== Career statistics ==
=== Club ===
As of match played 28 October 2026

Appearances and goals by club, season and competition
Club	Season	League			FA Cup (Note: Includes the Women's FA Cup)		League Cup (Note: Includes the WSL Cup/Women's League Cup/WSL Players Cup)		Total	
Club	Season	Division	Apps	Goals	Apps	Goals	Apps	Goals	Apps	Goals
Liverpool	2017–18	Women's Super League	0	0	1	0	0	0	1	0
Manchester United	2018–19	Women's Championship	2	0	1	0	0	0	3	0
Manchester United	2019–20	Women's Super League	0	0	0	0	1	0	1	0
Manchester United	2020–21	Women's Super League	0	0	0	0	2	0	2	0
Manchester United	Total		2	0	2	0	3	0	6	0
Sheffield United (loan)	2019–20	Women's Championship	1	0	1	0	0	0	2	0
West Ham United (loan)	2020–21	Women's Super League	0	0	1	0	0	0	1	0
Birmingham City (loan)	2021–22	Women's Super League	15	0	1	0	1	0	17	0
Everton (loan)	2022–23	Women's Super League	8	0	0	0	1	0	9	0
Everton	2023–24	Women's Super League	2	0	0	0	2	0	4	0
Everton	2024–25	Women's Super League	1	0	1	0	1	0	3	0
Everton	2025–26	Women's Super League	6	0	0	0	2	0	8	0
Everton	Total		9	0	1	0	3	0	11	0
Aston Villa	2026–27	Women's Super League	0	0	0	0	3	0	3	0
Career total			35	0	6	0	13	0	54	0

== Honours ==
Manchester United

- FA Women's Championship: 2018–19

England U20

- FIFA U-20 Women's World Cup third place: 2018

England

- Arnold Clark Cup: 2023
