= Issy Hobson =

English footballer (born 2007)

Personal information
- Full name: Isabella Hobson
- Date of birth: 31 October 2007 (age 19)
- Position: Defender

Team information
- Current team: Everton
- Number: 4

Youth career
- Everton

Senior career*
Years	Team	Apps	(Gls)
2023–	Everton	14	(1)
2025	→ Sheffield United (loan)	7	(0)
2025	→ Nottingham Forest (loan)	1	(0)
2026	→ Rosenborg (loan)	7	(0)

International career^{‡}
2023–2024	England U17	1	(0)
2024–	England U19	4	(0)
- * Club domestic league appearances and goals as of 14:24, 29 March 2026 (UTC) ‡ National team caps and goals as of 3 December 2024

Isabella Hobson (born 31 October 2007) is an English professional footballer who plays as a defender for Women's Super League club Everton, and the England under-19s. Hobson previously played for Sheffield United and Nottingham Forest.

== Club career ==
Hobson progressed through the Everton Academy to make her first team debut as a second-half substitute against Leicester City in the League Cup group stage on 24 January 2024 playing 35 minutes of the 5–1 loss. Her first Women's Super League appearance was on 2 March 2024, again coming off the bench versus Manchester City.

Aged 16 years and 180 days, Hobson became the youngest-ever goalscorer in the WSL when she netted a stoppage time equaliser for Everton in their 1–1 draw with Arsenal at Walton Hall Park on 28 April 2024. The goal was nominated for WSL April 2024 goal of the month.

In January 2025, Hobson joined Sheffield United on loan for the remainder of the 2024–25 season. She was recalled from the loan on 14 April 2025.

On 4 September 2025, Hobson was sent out on a season-long loan to Nottingham Forest. She was recalled from the loan less than a month after joining Nottingham Forest, on 1 October 2025, due to ongoing injuries at Everton.

Hobson signed her first professional contract with Everton on 6 November 2025, tying her into the club until at least the end of June 2027.

On 1 April 2026, Hobson joined Toppserien side Rosenborg on loan until the end of June 2026.

== International career ==
Hobson debuted for the England U17 team during 2024 UEFA Women's Under-17 Championship qualification, appearing as a substitute in a 6–0 victory over Northern Ireland on 4 November 2023. She made her first start and played 29 minutes in the team's 2–0 win over the Philippines at the invitational MIMA Cup in Spain on 5 February 2024.

On 16 October 2024, Hobson was called up to the England U19 team for Algarve Cup matches against Netherlands and Norway.

== Career statistics ==
=== Club ===
As of match played 28 March 2026

Appearances and goals by club, season and competition
Club	Season	League			FA Cup		League Cup		Total	
Club	Season	Division	Apps	Goals	Apps	Goals	Apps	Goals	Apps	Goals
Everton	2023–24	Women's Super League	4	1	0	0	1	0	5	1
Everton	2024–25	Women's Super League	6	0	0	0	3	0	9	0
Everton	2025–26	Women's Super League	4	0	1	1	0	0	5	1
Everton	Total		14	1	1	1	4	0	19	2
Sheffield United (loan)	2024–25	Women's Championship	6	0	1	0	—		7	0
Nottingham Forest (loan)	2025–26	Women's Super League 2	0	0	0	0	1	0	1	0
Career total			20	1	2	1	4	0	27	2
