= Justine Vanhaevermaet =

Belgian footballer

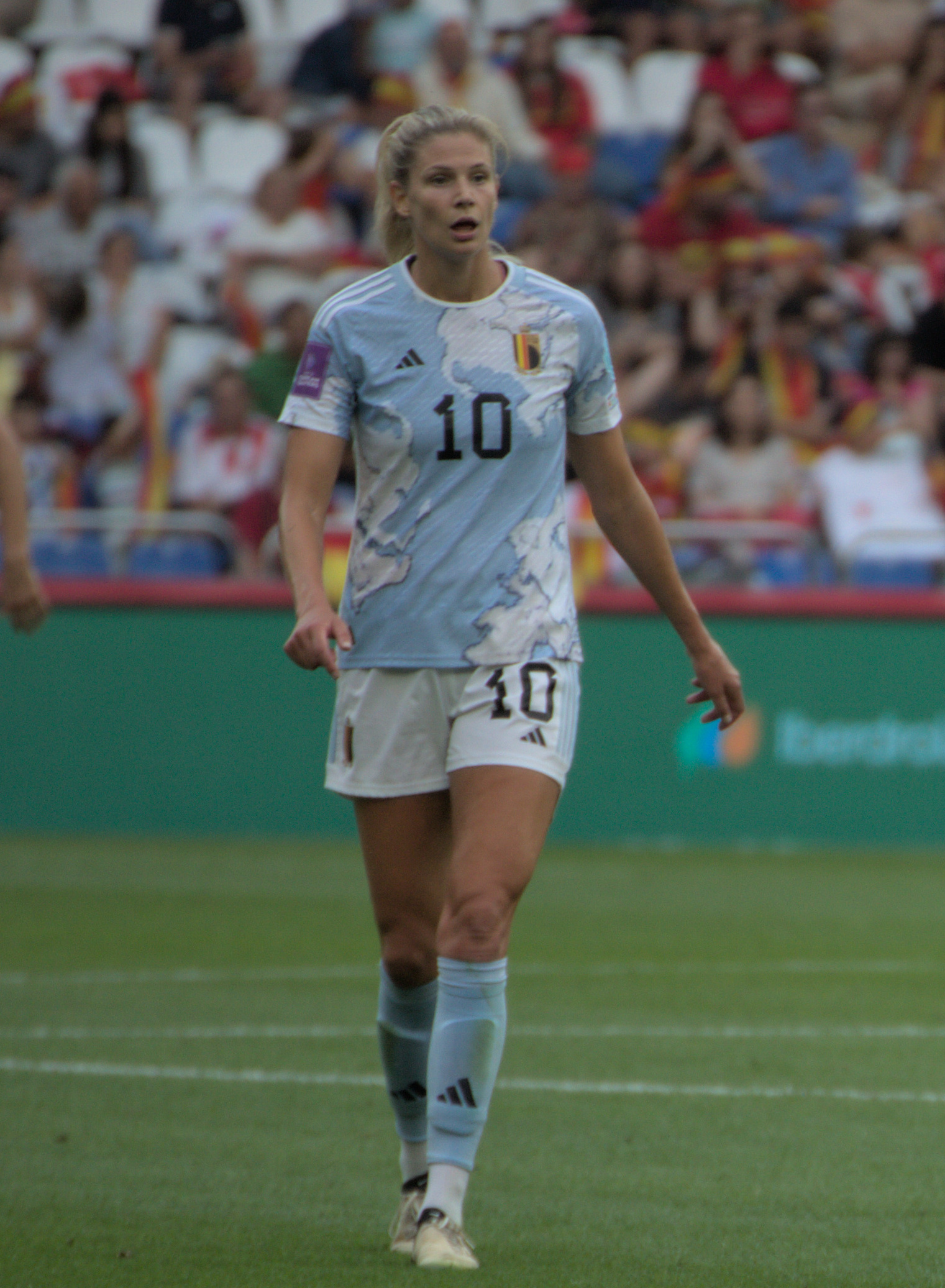
- Vanhaevermaet in 2024

Personal information
- Full name: Justine Monique Vanhaevermaet
- Date of birth: 29 April 1992 (age 34)
- Place of birth: Sint-Niklaas, Belgium
- Height: 1.85 m (6 ft 1 in)
- Position: Midfielder

Team information
- Current team: Crystal Palace
- Number: 18

Senior career*
Years	Team	Apps	(Gls)
2008–2012	WB Sinaai Girls		
2012–2013	Anderlecht	12	(2)
2013–2016	Lierse (Note: Stats refer to BeNe League matches only)	48	(10)
2016–2018	Anderlecht	41	(12)
2018	SC Sand	3	(1)
2019	Røa	21	(3)
2020–2021	LSK Kvinner	26	(2)
2021–2023	Reading	39	(6)
2023–2025	Everton	31	(1)
2025–	Crystal Palace	12	(2)

International career^{‡}
2008–2009	Belgium U17	11	(1)
2009–2011	Belgium U19	21	(7)
2013–	Belgium	67	(7)
- * Club domestic league appearances and goals as of 15:46, 12 February 2025 (UTC) ‡ National team caps and goals as of 5 December 2024

Justine Monique Vanhaevermaet (Flemish: [ʑʏsˈtinə vɑnˈɦaːvərmaːt]; born 29 April 1992) is a Belgian professional footballer who plays as a midfielder for Women's Super League club Crystal Palace and the Belgium national team.

== Club career ==
Vanhaevermaet started with Sinaai Girls from Waasland-Beveren. From 2012 she played first for RSC Anderlecht then for Lierse SK in the joint Belgian-Dutch BeNe League. After a short stay at Bundesliga club SC Sand, she moved to Norwegian first division club Røa IL in 2019 and to league rivals Lillestrøm Kvinner FK in 2020. With Lillestrøm she qualified for the round of 16 of the 2020–21 UEFA Champions League. After a 2–0 win over the Belarusian champions FC Minsk, to which she contributed the second goal, they were able to afford a 0–1 defeat in the home game to reach the round of 16, which took place in March 2021. They were eliminated after two 0–2 defeats against VfL Wolfsburg.

On 17 August 2021, Reading announced the signing of Vanhaevermaet to a two-year contract.

On 3 August 2023, Vanhaevermaet was announced at Everton on a two-year contract. On 18 June 2025, Everton confirmed she would be leaving the club when her contract expired.

On 13 August 2025, Vanhaevermaet was announced at Crystal Palace on a two-year contract.

== International career ==
=== Youth ===
Vanhaevermaet took part in the second qualifying round for the inaugural 2008 UEFA U17 European Championship in April 2008. At the tournament in the Czech Republic they achieved a 1–1 draw in the first game against the Netherlands, but then lost twice 1–3 against England and the hosts. They were eliminated as bottom of the group. At least she scored her first international goal against England. In October they made a new attempt and had home advantage in the first round. They were able to take advantage of this and reach the second round with two wins and one draw. They played at home in the second qualifying round for the 2009 UEFA U17 European Championship but missed the finals as bottom of the group.

In September 2009 she took part in the first qualifying round for the 2010 UEFA U19 European Championship in Hungary. With a 10–0 win against Armenia, in which she contributed her first three U-19 goals, and a 4–2 win against Latvia, in which she scored the first and last goals, as well as a goalless draw against the hosts they qualify for the second round as group winners. At the tournament starting at the end of March 2010, they were able to win two games, scoring the 2–1 winner against Ukraine. However, they missed the finals due to a 5–0 defeat against Italy. At the next attempt in September 2010, they only needed two wins against Estonia and Lithuania as Azerbaijan withdrew shortly before the tournament to reach the second round. At the end of March and early April they were able to qualify for the finals with two draws against Serbia and Finland and a win against hosts Russia. At the 2011 UEFA U19 European Championship, she was captain. Her team was eliminated in the preliminary round.

=== Senior ===
On 14 August 2013 she came on as a substitute for the Belgian senior national team for the first time in a friendly against Austria. She also came on as a substitute against South Africa in her second appearance, at the 2015 Cyprus Cup. On 19 January 2017 she played over 90 minutes for the first time in her sixth international match. The opponent in the 2–1 win was the French U-23 team. She had two appearances at the 2017 Cyprus Cup and then twice again at the 2018 Cyprus Cup.

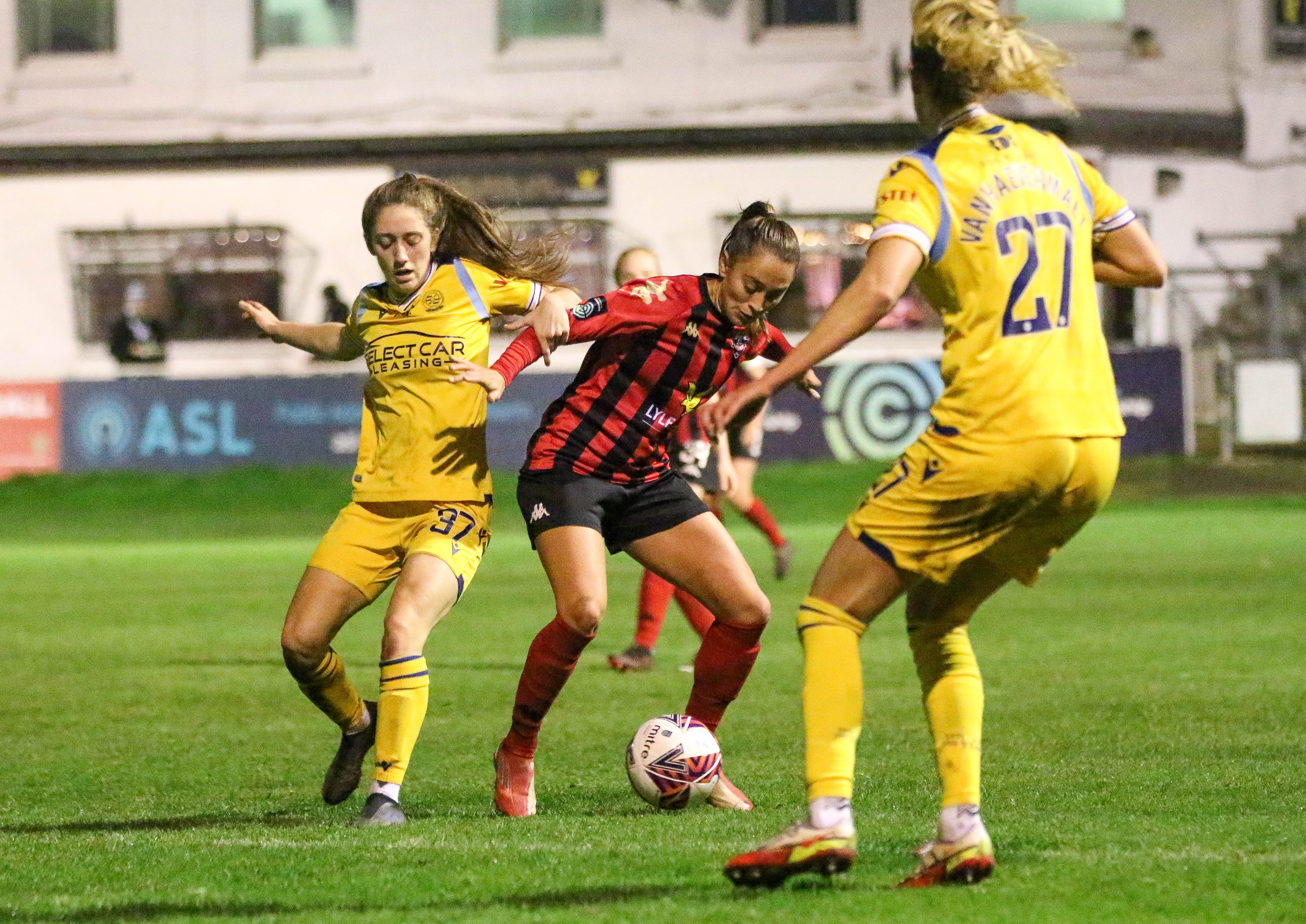
Vanhaevermaet (no. 27 shirt) in 2021

When qualifying for the Euro 2022 began in September 2019, she became a regular player. She was used in all eight games, scored her first goal for the senior national team in a 6–1 win against Romania on 18 September 2020 and was able to win with her team in the last game with a 4–0 win against Switzerland qualify again for the European Championship finals.

In the first eight games of qualifying for the 2023 World Cup, she played seven times and scored three goals.

At the European Championship finals, she was in the starting line-up in her team's four games, which ended with a 0–1 defeat against Sweden in the quarter-finals. In the first group game against Iceland she scored the goal with a penalty to make the final score 1-1.

After the European Championships, she played in the last two group games of qualifying for the 2023 World Cup and qualified with her team for the play-offs for the runners-up in the group. However, her team failed in the first play-off round with a 1–2 defeat against Portugal. She was selected by Ives Serneels to compete in the 2023 Arnold Clark Cup where Belgium finished second.

She went on to contribute to Belgium's successful qualification for UEFA Women's Euro 2025 via the play-offs, starting both legs of the play-off final against Ukraine.

On 11 June 2025, Vanhaevermaet was called up to the Belgium squad for the UEFA Women's Euro 2025.

== Career statistics ==
=== Club ===
As of match played 9 February 2025

Appearances and goals by club, season and competition
Club	Season	League			National Cup		League Cup		Continental		Total	
Club	Season	Division	Apps	Goals	Apps	Goals	Apps	Goals	Apps	Goals	Apps	Goals
Anderlecht	2012–13	BeNe League	12	2	?	?	—		—		12	2
Lierse SK	2013–14	BeNe League	25	8	?	?	—		—		25	8
Lierse SK	2014–15	BeNe League	23	2	?	?	—		—		23	2
Lierse SK	Total		48	10	?	?	—		—		48	10
Anderlecht	2015–16	Belgian Women's Super League	15	0	?	?	—		—		15	0
Anderlecht	2016–17	Belgian Women's Super League	13	6	?	?	—		—		13	6
Anderlecht	2017–18	Belgian Women's Super League	13	6	?	?	—		—		13	6
Anderlecht	Total		41	12	?	?	—		—		41	12
SC Sand	2018–19	Frauen-Bundesliga	3	1	0	0	—		—		3	1
Røa IL	2019	Toppserien	21	3	3	0	—		—		24	3
LSK Kvinner	2020	Toppserien	15	2	4	1	—		4	1	23	4
LSK Kvinner	2021	Toppserien	11	0	1	0	—		—		12	0
LSK Kvinner	Total		26	2	5	1	—		4	1	35	4
Reading	2021–22	Women's Super League	19	2	2	1	3	0	—		24	3
Reading	2022–23	Women's Super League	20	4	2	0	2	1	—		24	5
Reading	Total		39	6	4	1	5	1	—		48	8
Everton	2023–24	Women's Super League	19	1	2	1	3	0	—		24	2
Everton	2023–24	Women's Super League	12	0	2	0	1	0	—		15	0
Everton	Total		31	1	4	1	4	0	—		39	2
Career total			221	7	16	3	9	1	4	1	250	42

=== International ===
As of match played 3 December 2024

Appearances and goals by national team and year
National team	Year	Apps	Goals
Belgium	2013	1	0
Belgium	2014	0	0
Belgium	2015	4	0
Belgium	2016	0	0
Belgium	2017	3	0
Belgium	2018	2	0
Belgium	2019	7	0
Belgium	2020	7	1
Belgium	2021	8	3
Belgium	2022	11	2
Belgium	2023	12	0
Belgium	2024	12	1
Total		67	7

Scores and results list Belgium's goal tally first, score column indicates score after each Vanhaevermaet goal.

List of international goals scored by Justine Vanhaevermaet
No.	Date	Venue	Opponent	Score	Result	Competition
1	18 September 2020	Den Dreef, Leuven, Belgium	Romania	6–1	6–1	UEFA Women's Euro 2022 qualifying
2	21 October 2021	Den Dreef, Leuven, Belgium	Kosovo	1–0	7–0	2023 FIFA Women's World Cup qualification
3	21 October 2021	Den Dreef, Leuven, Belgium	Kosovo	5–0	7–0	2023 FIFA Women's World Cup qualification
4	25 November 2021	Den Dreef, Leuven, Belgium	Armenia	11–0	19–0	2023 FIFA Women's World Cup qualification
5	10 July 2022	Academy Stadium, Manchester, England	Iceland	1–0	1–1	UEFA Women's Euro 2022
6	6 September 2022	FFA Academy Stadium, Yerevan, Armenia	Armenia	3–0	7–0	2023 FIFA Women's World Cup qualification
7	23 February 2024	Pancho Aréna, Felcsút, Hungary	Hungary	3–1	5–1	2023–24 UEFA Women's Nations League
8	8 April 2025	Den Dreef, Leuven, Belgium	England	2–0	3–2	2025 UEFA Women's Nations League
9	7 July 2025	Arena Thun, Thun, Switzerland	Spain	1–1	2–6	UEFA Women's Euro 2025

== Honours ==
- Belgian Women's Super League: 2017–18
- Belgian Women's Cup winner: 2010–11, 2012–13, 2014–15
