= Rikke Madsen =

Danish footballer (born 1997)

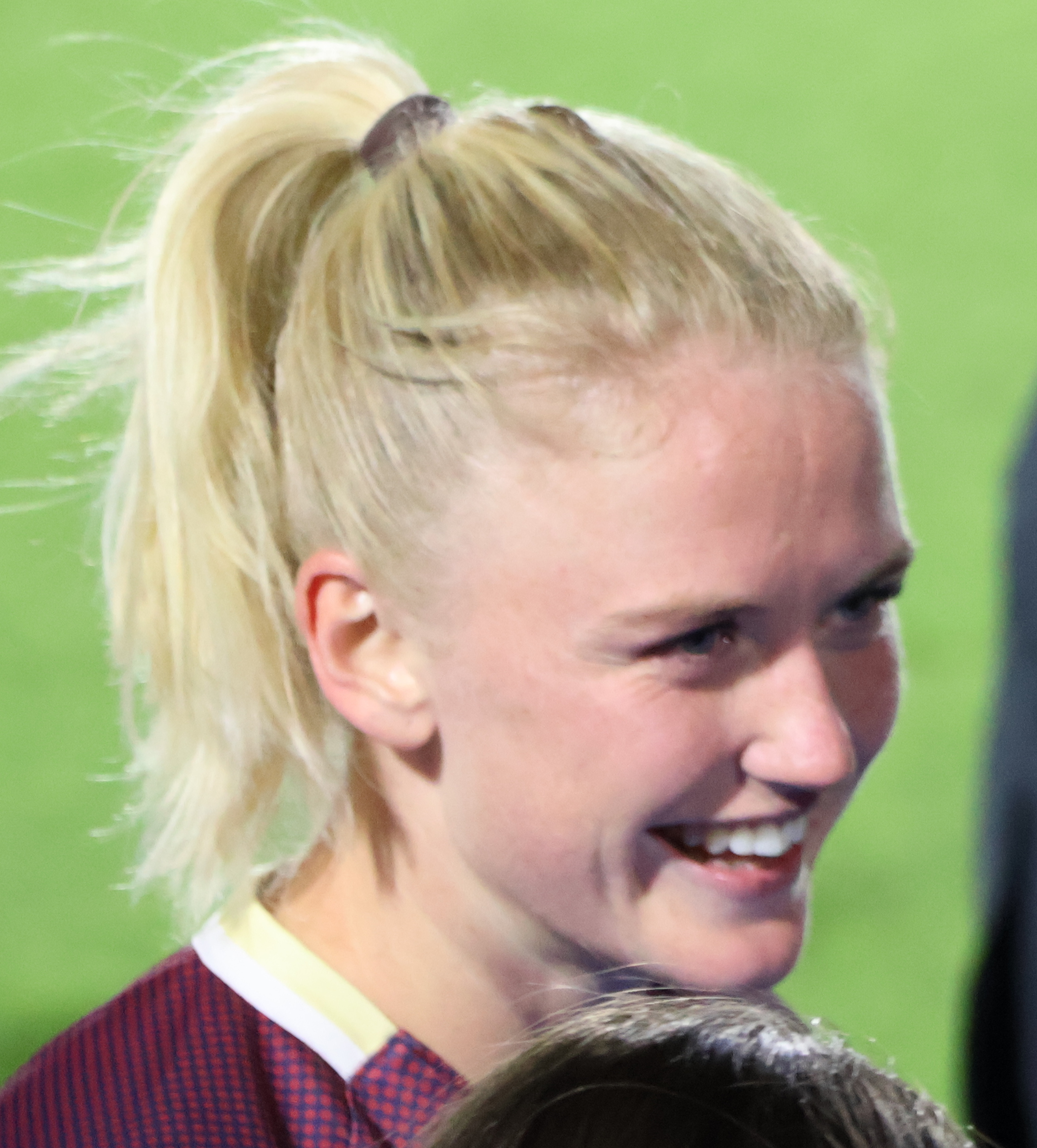
- Madsen with North Carolina Courage in 2023

Personal information
- Full name: Rikke Marie Madsen
- Date of birth: 9 August 1997 (age 29)
- Place of birth: Varde, Denmark
- Height: 1.72 m (5 ft 8 in)
- Position: Forward

Team information
- Current team: HB Køge
- Number: 17

Senior career*
Years	Team	Apps	(Gls)
2018–2019	VSK Aarhus	18	(6)
2019–2021	Vålerenga	53	(7)
2022	Madrid CFF	13	(1)
2022–2023	North Carolina Courage	24	(1)
2022–2023	→ Melbourne Victory (loan)	7	(1)
2024–2025	Everton	13	(0)
2025–	HB Køge	3	(0)

International career^{‡}
2013	Denmark U16	6	(4)
2013	Denmark U17	7	(0)
2014–2016	Denmark U19	14	(0)
2018	Denmark U23	1	(0)
2019–	Denmark	33	(1)
- * Club domestic league appearances and goals as of 31 August 2025 ‡ National team caps and goals as of 2 September 2025

Rikke Marie Madsen (Danish: [ˈʁækə mæˈʁiˀə ˈmæsn̩, ˈʁekə -]; born 9 August 1997) is a Danish professional footballer who plays as a forward for HB Køge and the Denmark national team.

== Early life ==
Madsen was born in Varde, Denmark. She started to play soccer when she was around five years old, but never dreamed of ever becoming a professional player. Madsen grew up in a 'sporty' family, where multiple of her family members participated in sports at fairly high levels.

== Club career ==
=== Vålerenga, 2019–2021 ===
In July 2019, Madsen joined Toppserien club Vålerenga.

In 2020, she helped the team win the 2020 Norwegian Women's Cup. Madsen played in the championship match, a victory over LSK Kvinner.

=== Madrid CFF, 2022 ===
After playing two and a half seasons in Norway, Madsen signed with Spanish club Madrid CFF on 11 January 2022.

=== North Carolina Courage, 2022–2023 ===
Madsen joined the North Carolina Courage of the National Women's Soccer League in August 2022, with a contract lasting until the end of the 2023 season.

On 14 May 2023, Madsen notched her first NWSL assist with a pass to Tyler Lussi, who proceeded to score a goal. Madsen's assist helped the Courage triumph over the OL Reign with a 1–0 victory.

Madsen scored her first goal with the Courage on 27 May 2023. In the 53rd minute of a match against Racing Louisville FC, Madsen placed a header into the back of the net, contributing to a 2–1 win over the home team.

On 20 November 2023, the Courage announced that Madsen was offered a new contract by the club. On 10 January 2024, the Courage announced that Madsen would not be returning to the team for the 2024 NWSL season.

==== Melbourne Victory (loan), 2022-2023 ====
On 17 December 2022, Melbourne Victory announced the signing of Madsen on loan from the Courage. Madsen joined as an injury replacement player for American forward Catherine Zimmerman, who had sustained a fractured fibula.

Madsen made her club debut for the Victory on 17 December 2022, in a match against the Newcastle Jets. She entered the game as a substitute and helped the Victory achieve a 5–2 win over their competitors.

Catherine Zimmerman's return from her fibula fracture concluded Madsen's injury replacement loan. Madsen returned to the Courage on 2 February 2023. In her time with the Victory, Madsen had appeared for the club 7 times and scored 1 goal.

=== Everton, 2024–2025 ===
On 13 January 2024, Women's Super League club Everton announced the signing of Madsen on a contract lasting until June 2025. At the time, Madsen became the sixth Danish member of Everton's roster.

Madsen made her first appearance for the club on 13 January 2024, the same day she was signed. Madsen was brought off the bench as a second-half substitute in a 3–0 victory over Aston Villa, helping the team reach the fifth round of the FA Women's League Cup.

On 24 May 2024, Madsen announced she was pregnant with her first child, rendering her unavailable for the foreseeable future.

On 9 May 2025, it was announced that Madsen would be leaving Everton at the end of June after her contract expired.

=== HB Køge ===
On 22 July 2025, Madsen was announced at HB Køge on a permanent transfer.

== Career statistics ==
=== International goals ===
No.	Date	Venue	Opponent	Score	Result	Competition
1.	12 November 2019	Viborg Stadium, Viborg, Denmark	Georgia	14–0	14–0	UEFA Women's Euro 2022 qualifying

== Personal life ==
Madsen is with partner Martin Thomsen. In October 2024, they had a baby girl called Frida. On 22 March 2025, in Madsen's first match following the birth of their daughter, Martin proposed to her following their 3–0 victory over Crystal Palace.
