= Karoline Olesen =

Danish football player (born 2005)

Personal information
- Date of birth: 3 February 2005 (age 21)
- Position: Midfielder

Team information
- Current team: Malmö FF
- Number: 17

Senior career*
Years	Team	Apps	(Gls)
2021–2023	Fortuna Hjørring	55	(4)
2023–2025	Everton	42	(1)
2025–	Malmö FF	15	(0)

International career^{‡}
2020–2021	Denmark U16	6	(0)
2021–2022	Denmark U17	5	(0)
2021–2023	Denmark U19	21	(3)
2024–	Denmark U23	10	(1)
- * Club domestic league appearances and goals as of 18 April 2026 ‡ National team caps and goals as of 18 April 2026

Karoline Olesen (Danish: [kʰæ(ʁ)oˈliːnə ˈoːləsn̩]; born 3 February 2005) is a Danish professional footballer who plays as a midfielder for Damallsvenskan club Malmö FF.

== Club career ==
Olesen began her professional career at Fortuna Hjørring as a 16-year-old. She scored a goal in her debut match. She ended her final season in the Elitedivision with the Player of the Month award.

Olesen signed for Everton on 15 August 2023. She scored her first goal for Everton on 13 January 2024, opening scoring in the second half of the 3–0 victory over Aston Villa in the FA Cup. On 9 May 2025, it was announced that Olesen would be leaving Everton at the end of June after her contract expired.

In June 2025, Olesen was announced at Malmö FF.
