= Karen Holmgaard =

Danish footballer (born 1999)

Personal information
- Full name: Karen Rosted Holmgaard
- Date of birth: 28 January 1999 (age 27)
- Place of birth: Bording, Denmark
- Height: 1.74 m (5 ft 9 in)
- Position: Midfielder

Team information
- Current team: Everton
- Number: 28

Senior career*
Years	Team	Apps	(Gls)
–2017	Vejle B		
2017–2020	Fortuna Hjørring	62	(15)
2021–2022	Turbine Potsdam	27	(2)
2022–	Everton	32	(3)

International career^{‡}
2014–2015	Denmark U16	9	(0)
2015–2016	Denmark U17	8	(2)
2016–2017	Denmark U19	13	(3)
2018	Denmark U23	1	(0)
2018–	Denmark	34	(3)
- * Club domestic league appearances and goals as of 18:27, 31 July 2024 (UTC) ‡ National team caps and goals as of 23:00, 5 December 2023 (UTC)

Karen Rosted Holmgaard (Norwegian: [ˈkʰɑːæn ˈʁʌsteð ˈhʌlmˌkɒˀ]; born 28 January 1999) is a Danish professional footballer who plays as a midfielder for Women's Super League club Everton and the Denmark national team.

== Early life ==
Holmgaard was born on 28 January 1999 in Bording, Denmark. She has a twin sister, Sara Holmgaard, who is also a professional football player.

== Club career ==
=== Fortuna Hjørring ===
Having previously played for Vejle BK from 2016 to 2017, Holmgaard signed for Fortuna Hjørring alongside twin sister Sara on 28 June 2017. She scored her first league goal on 1 October 2017.

On 22 May 2018, both Holmgaard sister's contracts were extended.

=== Turbine Potsdam ===
On 4 December 2020, Karen and Sara Holmgaard joined Frauen-Bundesliga clubTurbine Potsdam.

Karen Holmgaard made her league debut against Wolfsburg on 5 February 2021. She scored her first league goal against Eintracht Frankfurt on 16 May 2021. In December 2021, she was sent off having picked up two yellow cards against Frankfurt.

=== Everton ===
In August 2022, both sisters joined Women's Super League side Everton, reuniting with former Hjørring cosch Brian Sørensen. Sara was loaned back to Turbine Potsdam for the beginning of the 2022–23 season; it was the first time the twins had played for different clubs.

Karen Holmgaard made her league debut against Leicester City on 29 September 2022. She scored her first league goal against West Ham on 22 January 2023.

On 1 August 2024, Holmgaard signed a new contract with Everton.

She sustained an ACL injury in Everton's 5–0 win over West Bromwich Albion in the FA Cup on 15 January 2026, ruling her out for the remainder of the season.

== International career ==
Having played for the Denmark under-19 team, Holmgaard received her first senior call-up in February 2018. She made her debut for the senior national team on 7 March 2018 against Finland. She was named Female Talent of the Year in 2018 by the Danish Football Union.

She scored her first senior goal against Azerbaijan on 12 April 2022. Holmgaard was selected for Denmark's squad at the Euro 2022.

She was selected for the World Cup 2023 squad. Denmark was eliminated by co-hosts Australia in the round of 16.

Despite recovery from a hip injury for most of the 2024–25 season, Holmgaard was selected for the Euro 2025; Denmark did not make it out of the group stage.

== International goals ==
No.	Date	Venue	Opponent	Score	Result	Competition
1.	12 April 2022	Viborg Stadium, Viborg, Denmark	Azerbaijan	2–0	2–0	2023 FIFA Women's World Cup qualification
2.	1 September 2022	Viborg Stadium, Viborg, Denmark	Montenegro	1–0	5–1	2023 FIFA Women's World Cup qualification
3.	11 October 2022	Viborg Stadium, Viborg, Denmark	Australia	1–0	1–3	Friendly
