= Sara Holmgaard =

Danish footballer (born 1999)

Personal information
- Full name: Sara Rosted Holmgaard
- Date of birth: 28 January 1999 (age 27)
- Place of birth: Bording, Denmark
- Height: 1.74 m (5 ft 9 in)
- Positions: Defender; midfielder

Team information
- Current team: Real Madrid
- Number: 21

Youth career
- 2014–2016: Vejle Idrætsefterskole

Senior career*
Years	Team	Apps	(Gls)
2016–2017	Vejle B		
2017–2020	Fortuna Hjørring	74	(12)
2021–2022	1. FFC Turbine Potsdam	23	(3)
2022–2025	Everton	34	(4)
2022–2023	→ Fortuna Hjørring (loan)	14	(2)
2025–	Real Madrid	23	(3)

International career^{‡}
2014–2015	Denmark U16	9	(0)
2015–2016	Denmark U17	10	(2)
2016–2018	Denmark U19	26	(1)
2018–2019	Denmark U23	2	(0)
2019–	Denmark	31	(4)
- * Club domestic league appearances and goals as of 26 August 2026 ‡ National team caps and goals as of 11:49, 11 November 2026 (UTC)

Sara Rosted Holmgaard (Danish: [sɑː(ʁ)æ ˈʁʌsteð ˈhʌlmkɒˀ]; born 28 January 1999) is a Danish professional footballer who plays as a defender or midfielder for Liga F club Real Madrid and the Denmark national team.

== Club career ==
=== First spell at Fortuna Hjørring ===
On 28 June 2017, Holmgaard and her sister Karen signed for Fortuna Hjørring. She made her league debut against Varde on 14 August 2017. Holmgaard scored her first league goal against Varde on 14 October 2017, scoring in the 35th minute. On 22 May 2018, Holmgaard and Karen's contract was extended.

=== Turbine Potsdam ===
On 4 December 2020, she joined Turbine Potsdam, together with Karen Holmgaard. She made her league debut against Wolfsburg on 5 February 2021. Holmgaard scored her first league goal against SGS Essen on 6 June 2021, scoring in the 48th minute.

=== Everton ===
On 13 January 2023, Holmgaard returned to Everton. She made her league debut against Reading on 15 January 2023. Holmgaard scored her first league goal against Tottenham Hotspur on 4 May 2024.

On 31 July 2024, Holmgaard signed a new contract with Everton.

In the 2024–25 FA Cup fifth round against Chelsea, Holmgaard scored an Olimpico.

=== Loan to Fortuna Hjørring ===
Holmgaard made her league debut against Sundby on 6 August 2022. She scored her first league goal against AGF on 13 August 2022, scoring in the 8th minute.

=== Real Madrid ===
On 24 June 2025, Holmgaard joined Liga F club Real Madrid on a two-year deal.

== International career ==
She made her international debut for the Danish national team in the 2019 Algarve Cup, against Norway on 27 February 2019. She scored her first goal against Belgium on 12 July 2024, scoring in the 82nd minute.

In June 2022, she was selected for A-national coach Lars Søndergaard's final squad at the European Championship 2022 in England.

== Personal life ==
She is the twin sister of Everton player Karen Holmgaard.

== Career statistics ==
=== International ===
Scores and results list Denmark's goal tally first, score column indicates score after each Holmgaard goal.

List of international goals scored by Sara Holmgaard
No.	Date	Venue	Opponent	Score	Result	Competition
1	12 July 2024	Stayen, Sint-Truiden, Belgium	Belgium	3–0	3–0	UEFA Women's Euro 2025 qualifying
2	25 February 2025	Stadio Alberto Picco, La Spezia, Italy	Italy	2–1	3–1	2025 UEFA Women's Nations League
3	24 October 2025	Tammelan Stadion, Tampere, Finland	Finland	5–0	6–1	2025 UEFA Women's Nations League play-off matches
4	24 October 2025	Tammelan Stadion, Tampere, Finland	Finland	6–1	6–1	2025 UEFA Women's Nations League play-off matches

== Honours ==
Fortuna Hjørring

- Elitedivisionen: 2017–18; runner-up: 2018–19
- Danish Women's Cup: 2019
