= 2022–23 in Spanish football =

Football in Spain
- Season: 2022–23

Men's football
- La Liga: Barcelona
- Segunda División: Granada
- Primera Federación: Amorebieta
- Copa del Rey: Real Madrid
- Copa Federación: Arenteiro
- Supercopa: Barcelona

Women's football
- Liga F: Barcelona
- Copa de la Reina: Atlético de Madrid
- Supercopa: Barcelona

The 2022–23 season was the 121st season of competitive association football in Spain.

== National team ==
=== Spain national football team ===
==== Friendlies ====
17 November 2022	Jordan	1–3	Spain	Amman, Jordan
21:45 UTC+2	Samir 90+2'	Report	Fati 13'; Gavi 56'; Williams 84'	Stadium: Amman International Stadium; Attendance: 20,000; Referee: Ahmed Al-Kaf (Oman)

==== 2022–23 UEFA Nations League ====
===== 2022–23 UEFA Nations League A Group 2 =====
Pos	Team	Pld	W	D	L	GF	GA	GD	Pts	Qualification or relegation	(Spain)	(Portugal)	(Switzerland)	(Czech Republic)
1	Spain	6	3	2	1	8	5	+3	11	Qualification for Nations League Finals	—	1–1	1–2	2–0
2	Portugal	6	3	1	2	11	3	+8	10		0–1	—	4–0	2–0
3	Switzerland	6	3	0	3	6	9	−3	9		0–1	1–0	—	2–1
4	Czech Republic (R)	6	1	1	4	5	13	−8	4	Relegation to League B	2–2	0–4	2–1	—

Source: UEFA
Rules for classification: Tiebreakers
(R) Relegated

24 September 2022	Spain	1–2	Switzerland	Zaragoza, Spain
20:45	Alba 51'	Report	Akanji 21'; Embolo 59'	Stadium: La Romareda; Attendance: 31,809; Referee: Clément Turpin (France)

27 September 2022	Portugal	0–1	Spain	Braga, Portugal
20:45 (19:45 UTC+1)		Report	Morata 88'	Stadium: Estadio Municipal; Attendance: 28,196; Referee: Daniele Orsato (Italy)

===== 2023 UEFA Nations League Finals =====
15 June 2023 SF	Spain	2–1	Italy	Enschede, Netherlands
20:45	Pino 3'; Joselu 88'	Report	Immobile 11' (pen.)	Stadium: De Grolsch Veste; Attendance: 24,558; Referee: Slavko Vinčić (Slovenia)

====== Final ======
18 June 2023
20:45

Croatia	0–0 (a.e.t.)	Spain
	Report
Penalties
Vlašić (penalty scored); Brozović (penalty scored); Modrić (penalty scored); Majer (penalty missed); Perišić (penalty scored); Petković (penalty missed)	4–5	(penalty scored) Joselu; (penalty scored) Rodri; (penalty scored) Merino; (penalty scored) Asensio; (penalty missed) Laporte; (penalty scored) Carvajal

De Kuip, Rotterdam
Attendance: 41,110
Referee: Felix Zwayer (Germany)

==== 2022 FIFA World Cup ====
===== Group E =====
Pos	Team	Pld	W	D	L	GF	GA	GD	Pts	Qualification
1	Japan	3	2	0	1	4	3	+1	6	Advance to knockout stage
2	Spain	3	1	1	1	9	3	+6	4	Advance to knockout stage
3	Germany	3	1	1	1	6	5	+1	4	
4	Costa Rica	3	1	0	2	3	11	−8	3	

Source: FIFA
Rules for classification: Group stage tiebreakers

23 November 2022	Spain	7–0	Costa Rica	Doha, Qatar
19:00 UTC+3	Olmo 11'; Asensio 21'; F. Torres 31' (pen.), 54'; Gavi 74'; Soler 90'; Morata 90+2'	Report		Stadium: Al Thumama Stadium; Attendance: 40,013; Referee: Mohammed Abdulla Hassan Mohamed (United Arab Emirates)

27 November 2022	Spain	1–1	Germany	Al Khor, Qatar
22:00 UTC+3	Morata 62'	Report	Füllkrug 83'	Stadium: Al-Bayt Stadium; Attendance: 68,895; Referee: Danny Makkelie (Netherlands)

1 December 2022	Japan	2–1	Spain	Al Rayyan, Qatar
22:00 UTC+3	Dōan 48'; Tanaka 51'	Report	Morata 11'	Stadium: Khalifa International Stadium; Referee: Victor Gomes (South Africa)

===== Knockout stage =====
6 December 2022 R16	Morocco	0–0 (a.e.t.) (3–0 p)	Spain	Al Rayyan, Qatar
18:00		Report		Stadium: Education City Stadium; Attendance: 44,667; Referee: Fernando Rapallini (Argentina)
	Penalties
	Sabiri (penalty scored); Ziyech (penalty scored); Benoun (penalty missed); Hakimi (penalty scored)		(penalty missed) Sarabia; (penalty missed) Soler; (penalty missed) Busquets

==== UEFA Euro 2024 qualifying ====
===== Group A =====
Pos	Team	Pld	W	D	L	GF	GA	GD	Pts	Qualification	(Spain)	(Scotland)	(Norway)	(Georgia (country))	(Cyprus)
1	Spain	8	7	0	1	25	5	+20	21	Qualify for final tournament	—	2–0	3–0	3–1	6–0
2	Scotland	8	5	2	1	17	8	+9	17	Qualify for final tournament	2–0	—	3–3	2–0	3–0
3	Norway	8	3	2	3	14	12	+2	11		0–1	1–2	—	2–1	3–1
4	Georgia	8	2	2	4	12	18	−6	8	Advance to play-offs via Nations League	1–7	2–2	1–1	—	4–0
5	Cyprus	8	0	0	8	3	28	−25	0		1–3	0–3	0–4	1–2	—

Source: UEFA
Rules for classification: Qualification tiebreakers

25 March 2023 1	Spain	3–0	Norway	Málaga, Spain
20:45 CEST (UTC+02:00)	Olmo 13'; Joselu 84', 85'	Report		Stadium: La Rosaleda; Attendance: 29,214; Referee: Benoît Bastien (France)

28 March 2023 2	Scotland	2–0	Spain	Glasgow, Scotland
20:45 CEST (UTC+02:00)	McTominay 7', 51'	Report		Stadium: Hampden Park; Attendance: 47,976; Referee: Sandro Schärer (Switzerland)

=== Spain women's national football team ===
==== Friendlies ====
1 July 2022	Italy	1–1	Spain	Castel di Sangro
	Bergamaschi 48'		Putellas 67'	Stadium: Stadio Teofilo Patini

7 October 2022	Spain	1–1	Sweden	Córdoba
20:30				Stadium: Estadio Nuevo Arcángel

11 October 2022	Spain	2–0	United States	Pamplona, Navarre
	Codina 39'; González 72'			Stadium: Estadio El Sadar; Attendance: 11,209; Referee: Deborah Bianchi (Italy)

11 November 2022	Spain	7–0	Argentina	Melilla
20:00				Stadium: Álvarez Claro

15 November 2022	Spain	1–0	Japan	Seville
20:00				Stadium: La Cartuja

6 April 2023	Spain	4–2	Norway	Ibiza
18:00	Hermoso 17', 22'; Paralluelo 52', 54'		Hegerberg 20'; Andreassen 86'	Stadium: Estadi Municipal de Can Misses; Attendance: 2,336; Referee: Ivana Projkovsk (North Macedonia)

11 April 2023	Spain	3–0	China

29 June 2023	Spain	7–0	Panama	Avilés
				Stadium: Ramón Suárez Puerta

==== UEFA Women's Euro ====
===== UEFA Women's Euro 2022 Group B =====
Pos	Team	Pld	W	D	L	GF	GA	GD	Pts	Qualification
1	Germany	3	3	0	0	9	0	+9	9	Advance to knockout stage
2	Spain	3	2	0	1	5	3	+2	6	Advance to knockout stage
3	Denmark	3	1	0	2	1	5	−4	3	
4	Finland	3	0	0	3	1	8	−7	0	

Source: UEFA
Rules for classification: Group stage tiebreakers

8 July 2022	Spain	4–1	Finland	Milton Keynes, United Kingdom
17:00	Guerrero 26'; Bonmatí 41'; L. García 75'; M. Caldentey 90+5' (pen.)	Report	Sällström 1'	Stadium: Stadium MK; Attendance: 16,819; Referee: Kateryna Monzul (Ukraine)

12 July 2022	Germany	2–0	Spain	Brentford, United Kingdom
21:00	Bühl 3'; Popp 37'	Report		Stadium: Brentford Community Stadium; Attendance: 16,037; Referee: Stéphanie Frappart (France)

16 July 2022	Denmark	0–1	Spain	Brentford, United Kingdom
21:00		Report	Cardona 90'	Stadium: Brentford Community Stadium; Referee: Rebecca Welch (England)

==== Knockout stage ====
20 July 2022 QF	England	2–1 (a.e.t.)	Spain	Brighton and Hove, England
	Toone 84'; Stanway 96'	Report	González 54'	Stadium: Falmer Stadium; Referee: Stéphanie Frappart (France)

==== 2023 FIFA Women's World Cup qualification ====
===== 2023 FIFA Women's World Cup qualification Group H =====
Pos	Team	Pld	W	D	L	GF	GA	GD	Pts	Qualification	(Spain)	(Scotland)	(Ukraine)	(Hungary)	(Faroe Islands)
1	Spain	8	8	0	0	53	0	+53	24	2023 FIFA Women's World Cup	—	8–0	5–0	3–0	12–0
2	Scotland	8	5	1	2	22	13	+9	16	Play-offs	0–2	—	1–1	2–1	7–1
3	Ukraine	8	3	1	4	12	20	−8	10		0–6	0–4	—	2–0	4–0
4	Hungary	8	3	0	5	19	19	0	9		0–7	0–2	4–2	—	7–0
5	Faroe Islands	8	0	0	8	2	56	−54	0		0–10	0–6	0–3	1–7	—

Source: UEFA
Rules for classification: Tiebreakers

2 September 2022	Spain	3–0	Hungary	Las Rozas de Madrid
	González 24'; Paredes 27'; Guijarro 74'	Report		Stadium: La Ciudad del Fútbol; Referee: Ivana Projkovska (North Macedonia)

6 September 2022	Spain	5–0	Ukraine	Las Rozas de Madrid
		Report		Stadium: La Ciudad del Fútbol; Referee: Jelena Cvetković (Serbia)

==== Cup of Nations ====
Pos	Team	Pld	W	D	L	GF	GA	GD	Pts
1	Australia (H, C)	3	3	0	0	10	2	+8	9
2	Spain	3	2	0	1	8	3	+5	6
3	Czech Republic	3	1	0	2	3	9	−6	3
4	Jamaica	3	0	0	3	2	9	−7	0

Rules for classification: 1) points; 2) goal difference; 3) goals scored; 4) head-to-head points; 5) head-to-head goal difference; 6) head-to-head number of goals scored; 7) FIFA ranking.
(C) Champions; (H) Hosts

16 February 2023	Spain	3–0	Jamaica	Gosford, Australia
	Oroz 18'; González 45+2'; Fiamma 78'	Report		Stadium: Central Coast Stadium; Referee: Lara Lee (Australia)

19 February 2023	Australia	3–2	Spain	Sydney, Australia
18:00	Vie 11'; Polkinghorne 16'; Foord 42'	Report	Carmona 74'; Redondo 90+4'	Stadium: CommBank Stadium; Attendance: 17,333; Referee: Yoshimi Yamashita (Japan)

22 February 2023	Czech Republic	0–3	Spain	Newcastle, Australia
15:00		Report	González 29', 40'; Del Castillo 84' (pen.)	Stadium: McDonald Jones Stadium; Referee: Rebecca Durcau (Australia)

=== Spain women's national under-20 football team ===
==== 2022 FIFA U-20 Women's World Cup ====
===== Group A =====
Pos	Team	Pld	W	D	L	GF	GA	GD	Pts	Qualification
1	Spain	3	2	1	0	8	0	+8	7	Knockout stage
2	Brazil	3	2	1	0	7	0	+7	7	Knockout stage
3	Australia	3	1	0	2	3	6	−3	3	
4	Costa Rica (H)	3	0	0	3	1	13	−12	0	

Source: FIFA
Rules for classification: Group stage tiebreakers
(H) Hosts

10 August 2022	Spain	0–0	Brazil	San José, Costa Rica
17:00 CST (UTC–6)		Report (FIFA); Report (Soccerway)		Stadium: Estadio Nacional de Costa Rica; Attendance: 9,819; Referee: Tori Penso (United States)

13 August 2022	Costa Rica	0–5	Spain	San José, Costa Rica
20:00 CST (UTC–6)		Report (FIFA); Report (Soccerway)	Majarín 26'; Mingueza 33'; Gabarro 62' (pen.); Elexpuru 74'; Paralluelo 90+4'	Stadium: Estadio Nacional de Costa Rica; Attendance: 22,446; Referee: Emikar Calderas (Venezuela)

16 August 2022	Australia	0–3	Spain	Alajuela, Costa Rica
20:00 CST (UTC–6)		Report (FIFA); Report (Soccerway)	Gabarro 19', 24', 61'	Stadium: Estadio Alejandro Morera Soto; Attendance: 939; Referee: Francia González (Mexico)

===== Knockout stage =====
20 August 2022 2022 FIFA U-20 Women's World Cup QF	Spain	1–0	Mexico	San José, Costa Rica
16:30 CST (UTC–6)	Gabarro 25'	Report (FIFA); Report (Soccerway)		Stadium: Estadio Nacional de Costa Rica, San José; Attendance: 4,914; Referee: Kim Yu-jeong (South Korea)

25 August 2022 2022 FIFA U-20 Women's World Cup SF	Spain	2–1	Netherlands	San José, Costa Rica
16:30 CST (UTC–6)	Gabarro 22', 25'	Report (FIFA); Report (Soccerway)	Van Gool 54'	Stadium: Estadio Nacional de Costa Rica; Attendance: 4,054; Referee: Tori Penso (United States)

===== Final =====
28 August 2022
20:00 UTC-6

Spain	3–1	Japan
Gabarro 12'; Paralluelo 22', 27' (pen.)	Report	Amano 47'

Estadio Nacional de Costa Rica, San José
Attendance: 29,891
Referee: Emikar Calderas (Venezuela)

== UEFA competitions ==
=== UEFA Super Cup ===
10 August 2022
22:00 UTC+3

Real Madrid (Spain)	2–0	(Germany) Eintracht Frankfurt
Alaba 37'; Benzema 65'	Report

Olympic Stadium, Helsinki
Attendance: 31,042
Referee: Michael Oliver (England)

=== UEFA Champions League ===
==== Group stage ====
===== Group B =====
Pos	Team	Pld	W	D	L	GF	GA	GD	Pts	Qualification	POR	BRU	LEV	ATM
1	(Portugal) Porto	6	4	0	2	12	7	+5	12	Advance to knockout phase	—	0–4	2–0	2–1
2	(Belgium) Club Brugge	6	3	2	1	7	4	+3	11	Advance to knockout phase	0–4	—	1–0	2–0
3	(Germany) Bayer Leverkusen	6	1	2	3	4	8	−4	5 (Note: Head-to-head points: Bayer Leverkusen 4, Atlético Madrid 1.)	Transfer to Europa League	0–3	0–0	—	2–0
4	(Spain) Atlético Madrid	6	1	2	3	5	9	−4	5		2–1	0–0	2–2	—

Source: UEFA

===== Group C =====
Pos	Team	Pld	W	D	L	GF	GA	GD	Pts	Qualification	BAY	INT	BAR	PLZ
1	(Germany) Bayern Munich	6	6	0	0	18	2	+16	18	Advance to knockout phase	—	2–0	2–0	5–0
2	(Italy) Inter Milan	6	3	1	2	10	7	+3	10	Advance to knockout phase	0–2	—	1–0	4–0
3	(Spain) Barcelona	6	2	1	3	12	12	0	7	Transfer to Europa League	0–3	3–3	—	5–1
4	(Czech Republic) Viktoria Plzeň	6	0	0	6	5	24	−19	0		2–4	0–2	2–4	—

Source: UEFA

===== Group F =====
Pos	Team	Pld	W	D	L	GF	GA	GD	Pts	Qualification	RMA	RBL	SHK	CEL
1	(Spain) Real Madrid	6	4	1	1	15	6	+9	13	Advance to knockout phase	—	2–0	2–1	5–1
2	(Germany) RB Leipzig	6	4	0	2	13	9	+4	12	Advance to knockout phase	3–2	—	1–4	3–1
3	(Ukraine) Shakhtar Donetsk	6	1	3	2	8	10	−2	6	Transfer to Europa League	1–1	0–4	—	1–1
4	(Scotland) Celtic	6	0	2	4	4	15	−11	2		0–3	0–2	1–1	—

Source: UEFA

===== Group G =====
Pos	Team	Pld	W	D	L	GF	GA	GD	Pts	Qualification	MCI	DOR	SEV	CPH
1	(England) Manchester City	6	4	2	0	14	2	+12	14	Advance to knockout phase	—	2–1	3–1	5–0
2	(Germany) Borussia Dortmund	6	2	3	1	10	5	+5	9	Advance to knockout phase	0–0	—	1–1	3–0
3	(Spain) Sevilla	6	1	2	3	6	12	−6	5	Transfer to Europa League	0–4	1–4	—	3–0
4	(Denmark) Copenhagen	6	0	3	3	1	12	−11	3		0–0	1–1	0–0	—

Source: UEFA

==== Knockout phase ====
===== Round of 16 =====
Team 1	Agg.	Team 2	1st leg	2nd leg
Liverpool (England)	2–6	(Spain) Real Madrid	2–5	0–1

===== Quarter-finals =====
Team 1	Agg.	Team 2	1st leg	2nd leg
Real Madrid (Spain)	4–0	(England) Chelsea	2–0	2–0

===== Semi-finals =====
Team 1	Agg.	Team 2	1st leg	2nd leg
Real Madrid (Spain)	1–5	(England) Manchester City	1–1	0–4

=== UEFA Europa League ===
==== Group stage ====
===== Group C =====
Pos	Team	Pld	W	D	L	GF	GA	GD	Pts	Qualification	BET	ROM	LUD	HJK
1	(Spain) Real Betis	6	5	1	0	12	4	+8	16	Advance to round of 16	—	1–1	3–2	3–0
2	(Italy) Roma	6	3	1	2	11	7	+4	10	Advance to knockout round play-offs	1–2	—	3–1	3–0
3	(Bulgaria) Ludogorets Razgrad	6	2	1	3	8	9	−1	7	Transfer to Europa Conference League	0–1	2–1	—	2–0
4	(Finland) HJK	6	0	1	5	2	13	−11	1		0–2	1–2	1–1	—

Source: UEFA

===== Group E =====
Pos	Team	Pld	W	D	L	GF	GA	GD	Pts	Qualification	RSO	MUN	SHE	OMO
1	(Spain) Real Sociedad	6	5	0	1	10	2	+8	15 (Note: Tied on head-to-head results. Overall goal difference is used as the tiebreaker.)	Advance to round of 16	—	0–1	3–0	2–1
2	(England) Manchester United	6	5	0	1	10	3	+7	15	Advance to knockout round play-offs	0–1	—	3–0	1–0
3	(Moldova) Sheriff Tiraspol	6	2	0	4	4	10	−6	6	Transfer to Europa Conference League	0–2	0–2	—	1–0
4	(Cyprus) Omonia	6	0	0	6	3	12	−9	0		0–2	2–3	0–3	—

Source: UEFA

==== Knockout stage ====
===== Knockout round play-offs =====
Team 1	Agg.	Team 2	1st leg	2nd leg
Barcelona (Spain)	3–4	(England) Manchester United	2–2	1–2
Sevilla (Spain)	3–2	(Netherlands) PSV Eindhoven	3–0	0–2

===== Round of 16 =====
Team 1	Agg.	Team 2	1st leg	2nd leg
Sevilla (Spain)	2–1	(Turkey) Fenerbahçe	2–0	0–1
Manchester United (England)	5–1	(Spain) Real Betis	4–1	1–0
Roma (Italy)	2–0	(Spain) Real Sociedad	2–0	0–0

===== Quarter-finals =====
Team 1	Agg.	Team 2	1st leg	2nd leg
Manchester United (England)	2–5	(Spain) Sevilla	2–2	0–3

===== Semi-finals =====
Team 1	Agg.	Team 2	1st leg	2nd leg
Juventus (Italy)	2–3	(Spain) Sevilla	1–1	1–2 (a.e.t.)

===== Final =====
31 May 2023
21:00 UTC+2

Sevilla (Spain)	1–1 (a.e.t.)	(Italy) Roma
Mancini 55' (o.g.)	Report	Dybala 35'
Penalties
Ocampos (penalty scored); Lamela (penalty scored); Rakitić (penalty scored); Montiel (penalty scored)	4–1	(penalty scored) Cristante; (penalty missed) Mancini; (penalty missed) Ibañez

Puskás Aréna, Budapest
Attendance: 61,476
Referee: Anthony Taylor (England)

=== UEFA Europa Conference League ===
==== Qualifying phase and play-off round ====
===== Play-off round =====
Team 1	Agg.	Team 2	1st leg	2nd leg
Villarreal (Spain)	6–2	(Croatia) Hajduk Split	4–2	2–0

===== Group C =====
Pos	Team	Pld	W	D	L	GF	GA	GD	Pts	Qualification	VIL	LCH	HBS	AW
1	(Spain) Villarreal	6	4	1	1	14	9	+5	13	Advance to round of 16	—	4–3	2–2	5–0
2	(Poland) Lech Poznań	6	2	3	1	12	7	+5	9	Advance to knockout round play-offs	3–0	—	0–0	4–1
3	(Israel) Hapoel Be'er Sheva	6	1	4	1	8	5	+3	7		1–2	1–1	—	4–0
4	Austria Wien	6	0	2	4	2	15	−13	2		0–1	1–1	0–0	—

Source: UEFA

==== Knockout stage ====
===== Round of 16 =====
Team 1	Agg.	Team 2	1st leg	2nd leg
Anderlecht (Belgium)	2–1	(Spain) Villarreal	1–1	1–0

=== UEFA Youth League ===
==== UEFA Champions League Path ====
===== Group stage =====
====== Group B ======
Pos	Team	Pld	W	D	L	GF	GA	GD	Pts	Qualification	ATM	POR	BRU	LEV
1	(Royal Spanish Football Federation) Atlético Madrid	6	5	0	1	14	4	+10	15	Round of 16	—	1–0	1–2	4–0
2	(Portuguese Football Federation) Porto	6	4	0	2	11	7	+4	12	Play-offs	1–2	—	2–1	3–1
3	(Royal Belgian Football Association) Club Brugge	6	3	0	3	10	9	+1	9		1–3	1–2	—	4–1
4	(German Football Association) Bayer Leverkusen	6	0	0	6	3	18	−15	0		0–3	1–3	0–1	—

Source: UEFA

====== Group C ======
Pos	Team	Pld	W	D	L	GF	GA	GD	Pts	Qualification	BAR	INT	BAY	PLZ
1	(Royal Spanish Football Federation) Barcelona	6	4	2	0	18	7	+11	14	Round of 16	—	2–0	3–2	3–0
2	(Italian Football Federation) Inter Milan	6	2	1	3	10	14	−4	7	Play-offs	1–6	—	2–2	4–2
3	(German Football Association) Bayern Munich	6	1	3	2	13	13	0	6		3–3	2–0	—	1–2
4	(Football Association of the Czech Republic) Viktoria Plzeň	6	1	2	3	8	15	−7	5		1–1	0–3	3–3	—

Source: UEFA

====== Group F ======
Pos	Team	Pld	W	D	L	GF	GA	GD	Pts	Qualification	RMA	SHK	RBL	CEL
1	(Royal Spanish Football Federation) Real Madrid	6	5	1	0	23	5	+18	16	Round of 16	—	6–1	1–1	4–1
2	(Ukrainian Association of Football) Shakhtar Donetsk	6	3	1	2	6	10	−4	10	Play-offs	0–3	—	0–0	2–1
3	(German Football Association) RB Leipzig	6	1	2	3	6	8	−2	5		2–3	0–2	—	1–2
4	(Scottish Football Association) Celtic	6	1	0	5	4	16	−12	3		0–6	0–1	0–2	—

Source: UEFA

====== Group G ======
Pos	Team	Pld	W	D	L	GF	GA	GD	Pts	Qualification	MCI	DOR	CPH	SEV
1	(The Football Association) Manchester City	6	4	2	0	16	8	+8	14	Round of 16	—	3–2	1–1	1–0
2	(German Football Association) Borussia Dortmund	6	2	2	2	9	9	0	8	Play-offs	3–3	—	0–2	2–0
3	(Danish Football Association) Copenhagen	6	2	1	3	9	8	+1	7		1–3	0–1	—	4–1
4	(Royal Spanish Football Federation) Sevilla	6	1	1	4	5	14	−9	4		1–5	1–1	2–1	—

Source: UEFA

==== Knockout Phase ====
===== Round of 16 =====
Team 1	Score	Team 2
Barcelona (Spain)	0–3	(Netherlands) AZ
Atlético Madrid (Spain)	4–1	(Belgium) Genk
Real Madrid (Spain)	3–1	(Austria) Red Bull Salzburg

===== Quarter-finals =====
Team 1	Score	Team 2
AZ (Netherlands)	4–0	(Spain) Real Madrid
Milan (Italy)	2–0	(Spain) Atlético Madrid

=== UEFA Women's Champions League ===
==== Qualifying rounds ====
===== Round 1 =====
====== Semi-finals ======
Team 1	Score	Team 2
Real Madrid (Spain)	6–0	(Austria) Sturm Graz

====== Final ======
Team 1	Score	Team 2
Manchester City (England)	0–1	(Spain) Real Madrid

===== Round 2 =====
Team 1	Agg.	Team 2	1st leg	2nd leg
Real Sociedad (Spain)	1–4	(Germany) Bayern Munich	0–1	1–3
Rosenborg (Norway)	1–5	(Spain) Real Madrid	0–3	1–2

==== Group stage ====
===== Group A =====
Pos	Team	Pld	W	D	L	GF	GA	GD	Pts	Qualification	CHE	PAR	MAD	VLL
1	(England) Chelsea	6	5	1	0	19	1	+18	16	Advance to Quarter-finals	—	3–0	2–0	8–0
2	(France) Paris Saint-Germain	6	3	1	2	11	5	+6	10	Advance to Quarter-finals	0–1	—	2–1	5–0
3	(Spain) Real Madrid	6	2	2	2	9	6	+3	8		1–1	0–0	—	5–1
4	(Albania) Vllaznia	6	0	0	6	1	28	−27	0		0–4	0–4	0–2	—

Source: UEFA

===== Group D =====
Pos	Team	Pld	W	D	L	GF	GA	GD	Pts	Qualification	BAR	MUN	BEN	ROS
1	(Spain) Barcelona	6	5	0	1	29	6	+23	15 (Note: Tied on head-to-head points. Head-to-head goal difference: Barcelona +1, Bayern Munich −1.)	Advance to Quarter-finals	—	3–0	9–0	6–0
2	(Germany) Bayern Munich	6	5	0	1	14	7	+7	15	Advance to Quarter-finals	3–1	—	2–0	2–1
3	(Portugal) Benfica	6	2	0	4	8	21	−13	6		2–6	2–3	—	1–0
4	(Sweden) Rosengård	6	0	0	6	3	20	−17	0		1–4	0–4	1–3	—

Source: UEFA

==== Knockout phase ====
===== Quarter-finals =====
Team 1	Agg.	Team 2	1st leg	2nd leg
Roma (Italy)	1–6	(Spain) Barcelona	0–1	1–5

===== Semi-finals =====
Team 1	Agg.	Team 2	1st leg	2nd leg
Chelsea (England)	1–2	(Spain) Barcelona	0–1	1–1

===== Final =====
3 June 2023
16:00 UTC+2

Barcelona (Spain)	3–2	(Germany) VfL Wolfsburg
Guijarro 48', 50'; Rolfö 70'	Report	Pajor 3'; Popp 37'

Philips Stadion, Eindhoven
Attendance: 33,147
Referee: Cheryl Foster (Wales)

== Men's football ==
=== League season ===
==== La Liga ====
Pos	Team	Pld	W	D	L	GF	GA	GD	Pts	Qualification or relegation
1	Barcelona (C)	38	28	4	6	70	20	+50	88	Qualification for the Champions League group stage
2	Real Madrid	38	24	6	8	75	36	+39	78	Qualification for the Champions League group stage
3	Atlético Madrid	38	23	8	7	70	33	+37	77	Qualification for the Champions League group stage
4	Real Sociedad	38	21	8	9	51	35	+16	71	Qualification for the Champions League group stage
5	Villarreal	38	19	7	12	59	40	+19	64	Qualification for the Europa League group stage
6	Real Betis	38	17	9	12	46	41	+5	60	Qualification for the Europa League group stage
7	Osasuna	38	15	8	15	37	42	−5	53	Qualification for the Europa Conference League play-off round (Note: Osasuna were initially disqualified from the 2023–24 UEFA Europa Conference League due to historic match-fixing. However, the club became later eligible to participate after an evidence of innocence had been provided.)
8	Athletic Bilbao	38	14	9	15	47	43	+4	51	
9	Mallorca	38	14	8	16	37	43	−6	50	
10	Girona	38	13	10	15	58	55	+3	49 (Note: Head-to-head points: Girona 8, Rayo Vallecano 6, Sevilla 1.)	
11	Rayo Vallecano	38	13	10	15	45	53	−8	49	
12	Sevilla	38	13	10	15	47	54	−7	49	Qualification for the Champions League group stage (Note: Sevilla qualified for the 2023–24 UEFA Champions League by winning the 2022–23 UEFA Europa League.)
13	Celta Vigo	38	11	10	17	43	53	−10	43	
14	Cádiz	38	10	12	16	30	53	−23	42 (Note: Head-to-head points: Cádiz 8, Getafe 5, Valencia 3.)	
15	Getafe	38	10	12	16	34	45	−11	42	
16	Valencia	38	11	9	18	42	45	−3	42	
17	Almería	38	11	8	19	49	65	−16	41	
18	Valladolid (R)	38	11	7	20	33	63	−30	40	Relegation to Segunda División
19	Espanyol (R)	38	8	13	17	52	69	−17	37	Relegation to Segunda División
20	Elche (R)	38	5	10	23	30	67	−37	25	Relegation to Segunda División

Source: LaLiga Santander
Rules for classification: 1) Points; 2) Head-to-head points; 3) Head-to-head goal difference; 4) Goal difference; 5) Goals scored; 6) Fair-play points (Note: Head-to-head record is used only after all the matches between the teams in question have been played)
(C) Champions; (R) Relegated

==== Segunda División ====
Pos	Team	Pld	W	D	L	GF	GA	GD	Pts	Qualification or relegation
1	Granada (C, P)	42	22	9	11	55	30	+25	75	Promotion to La Liga
2	Las Palmas (P)	42	18	18	6	49	29	+20	72 (Note: Overall goal difference: Las Palmas +20, Levante +16.)	Promotion to La Liga
3	Levante	42	18	18	6	46	30	+16	72	Qualification for promotion play-offs
4	Alavés (O, P)	42	19	14	9	47	33	+14	71 (Note: Alavés finished ahead of Eibar on head-to-head points: Eibar 0–0 Alavés, Alavés 2–0 Eibar.)	Qualification for promotion play-offs
5	Eibar	42	19	14	9	45	36	+9	71	Qualification for promotion play-offs
6	Albacete	42	17	16	9	58	47	+11	67	Qualification for promotion play-offs
7	Andorra	42	16	11	15	47	37	+10	59 (Note: Andorra finished ahead of Oviedo on head-to-head points: Oviedo 0–1 Andorra, Andorra 3–1 Oviedo.)	
8	Oviedo	42	16	11	15	34	35	−1	59	
9	Cartagena	42	16	10	16	47	49	−2	58	
10	Tenerife	42	14	15	13	42	37	+5	57	
11	Burgos	42	13	15	14	33	35	−2	54 (Note: Burgos finished ahead of Racing Santander on head-to-head points: Racing Santander 0–1 Burgos, Burgos 2–1 Racing Santander.)	
12	Racing Santander	42	14	12	16	39	40	−1	54	
13	Zaragoza	42	12	17	13	40	39	+1	53 (Note: Zaragoza finished ahead of Leganés on head-to-head goal difference: Leganés 2–1 Zaragoza, Zaragoza 3–0 Leganés.)	
14	Leganés	42	14	11	17	37	42	−5	53	
15	Huesca	42	11	19	12	36	36	0	52 (Note: Huesca finished ahead of Mirandés on head-to-head points: Mirandés 1–1 Huesca, Huesca 1–0 Mirandés.)	
16	Mirandés	42	13	13	16	48	54	−6	52	
17	Sporting Gijón	42	11	17	14	43	48	−5	50 (Note: Overall goal difference: Sporting Gijón −5, Villarreal B −6.)	
18	Villarreal B	42	13	11	18	49	55	−6	50	Not eligible for promotion
19	Ponferradina (R)	42	9	17	16	40	53	−13	44 (Note: Ponferradina finished ahead of Málaga on head-to-head goal difference: Málaga 1–0 Ponferradina, Ponferradina 2–0 Málaga.)	Relegation to Primera Federación
20	Málaga (R)	42	10	14	18	37	44	−7	44	Relegation to Primera Federación
21	Ibiza (R)	42	7	13	22	33	66	−33	34	Relegation to Primera Federación
22	Lugo (R)	42	6	13	23	27	57	−30	31	Relegation to Primera Federación

Source: LaLiga SmartBank
Rules for classification: 1) points; 2) head-to-head points; 3) head-to-head goal difference; 4) goal difference; 5) number of goals scored
(C) Champions; (O) Play-off winners; (P) Promoted; (R) Relegated
Notes:

Notes

1. Reserve teams are not eligible for promotion to the same league as the first team.

=== Cup competitions ===
==== 2022–23 Copa del Rey ====
===== Final =====
6 May 2023
22:00 CEST

Real Madrid	2–1	Osasuna
Rodrygo 2', 70'	Report	Torró 58'

La Cartuja, Seville
Attendance: 55,579
Referee: José María Sánchez Martínez (Murcia)

==== Supercopa de España ====
Semi-finals
11 January 2023 – Riyadh
Real Madrid (p)	1 (4)
Valencia	1 (3)
12 January 2023 – Riyadh
Real Betis	2 (2)
Barcelona (p)	2 (4)

Final
15 January 2023 – Riyadh
Real Madrid	1
Barcelona	3

===== Final =====
15 January 2023
22:00

Real Madrid	1–3	Barcelona
Benzema 90+3'	Report	Gavi 33'; Lewandowski 45'; Pedri 69'

King Fahd International Stadium, Riyadh
Attendance: 57,340
Referee: Ricardo de Burgos Bengoetxea (Basque Country)

==== Copa Federación de España ====
===== Final =====
2 November	Alzira (4)	0–2 (a.e.t.)	Arenteiro (4)	Alzira
19:30				Stadium: Luis Suñer Picó

=== International competitions ===
==== FIFA Club World Cup ====
First round
1 February – Tangier
(Egypt) Al Ahly	3
(New Zealand) Auckland City	0

Second round
4 February – Tangier
(United States) Seattle Sounders FC	0
(Egypt) Al Ahly	1
4 February – Rabat
(Morocco) Wydad Casablanca	1 (3)
(Saudi Arabia) Al-Hilal (p)	1 (5)

Semi-finals
8 February – Rabat
(Egypt) Al Ahly	1
(Spain) Real Madrid	4
7 February – Tangier
(Brazil) Flamengo	2
(Saudi Arabia) Al-Hilal	3

Final
11 February – Rabat
(Spain) Real Madrid	5
(Saudi Arabia) Al-Hilal	3
Third place
11 February – Tangier
(Egypt) Al Ahly	2
(Brazil) Flamengo	4

===== Matches =====
8 February 2023 SF	Al Ahly (Egypt)	1–4	(Spain) Real Madrid	Rabat
20:00	Maâloul 65' (pen.)	Report	Vinícius 42'; Valverde 46'; Rodrygo 90+2'; Arribas 90+8'	Stadium: Prince Moulay Abdellah Stadium; Attendance: 43,508; Referee: Andrés Matonte (Uruguay)

11 February 2023 F	Real Madrid (Spain)	5–3	(Saudi Arabia) Al-Hilal	Rabat
20:00	Vinícius 13', 69'; Valverde 18', 58'; Benzema 54'	Report	Marega 26'; Vietto 63', 79'	Stadium: Prince Moulay Abdellah Stadium; Attendance: 44,439; Referee: Anthony Taylor (England)

== Women's football ==
=== League season ===
==== Liga F ====
Pos	Team	Pld	W	D	L	GF	GA	GD	Pts	Qualification or relegation
1	Barcelona (C)	30	28	1	1	118	10	+108	85	Qualification for the Champions League group stage
2	Real Madrid	30	24	3	3	80	25	+55	75	Qualification for the Champions League second round
3	Levante	30	21	3	6	80	34	+46	66	Qualification for the Champions League first round
4	Atlético de Madrid	30	16	9	5	54	35	+19	57	
5	Madrid CFF	30	17	5	8	65	48	+17	56	
6	UDG Tenerife	30	11	7	12	35	44	−9	40	
7	Sevilla	30	10	10	10	45	44	+1	40	
8	Real Sociedad	30	10	9	11	54	50	+4	39	
9	Valencia	30	11	4	15	36	55	−19	37	
10	Athletic Club	30	10	5	15	34	44	−10	35	
11	Levante Las Planas	30	6	8	16	24	61	−37	26	
12	Real Betis	30	6	7	17	26	62	−36	25	
13	Sporting de Huelva	30	6	7	17	24	54	−30	25	
14	Villarreal	30	5	8	17	27	65	−38	23	
15	Alhama (R)	30	5	6	19	24	57	−33	21	Relegation to Primera Federación
16	Alavés (R)	30	5	6	19	35	73	−38	21	Relegation to Primera Federación

Source: Liga F
Rules for classification: 1) Points; 2) Head-to-head points; 3) Goal difference; 4) Number of goals scored
(C) Champions; (R) Relegated

=== Cup competitions ===
==== Copa de la Reina ====
===== Final =====
27 May 2023
22:00

Atlético de Madrid	2–2 (a.e.t.)	Real Madrid
Moral 88'; Banini 90+5'; Lundkvist (yellow card) 111'; Alexia (yellow card) 114'	ESPN report Real Madrid report Atlético report	Toletti 31'; Kathellen (yellow card) 34'; Ivana 56'; Oroz (yellow card) 90+3'
Penalties
Menayo (penalty scored); Guerrero (penalty scored); Eva Navarro (penalty scored); Banini (penalty missed)	3–1	(penalty scored) Weir; (penalty missed) Carmona; (penalty missed) Teresa; (penalty missed) Svava

Estadio Municipal de Butarque, Leganés
Attendance: 9,217
Referee: Ainara Andrea Acevedo Dudley

==== Supercopa de España ====
===== Bracket =====
Semi-finals
18 January 2023
Real Sociedad	1
Sporting de Huelva	0
19 January 2023
Barcelona	3
Real Madrid	1

Final
22 January 2023
Real Sociedad	0
Barcelona	3

===== Final =====
22 January 2023
12:00

Real Sociedad	0–3	Barcelona
	Report	Bonmatí 13', 47'; Oshoala 90+7'

Estadio Romano, Mérida
Attendance: 6,339
Referee: Marta Frías Acedo (Aragón)
