= 2022 FIFA U-20 Women's World Cup =

Copa Mundial Femenina Sub-20 de la FIFA Costa Rica 2022
- The official emblem Vamos Juntas (Let's go together)

Tournament details
- Host country: Costa Rica
- Dates: 10–28 August
- Teams: 16 (from 6 confederations)
- Venues: 2 (in 2 host cities)

Final positions
- Champions: Spain (1st title)
- Runners-up: Japan
- Third place: Brazil
- Fourth place: Netherlands

Tournament statistics
- Matches played: 32
- Goals scored: 86 (2.69 per match)
- Attendance: 174,650 (5,458 per match)
- Top scorer(s): (Spain) Inma Gabarro (8 goals)
- Best player: (Japan) Maika Hamano
- Best goalkeeper: (Spain) Txell Font
- Fair play award: Japan

The 2022 FIFA U-20 Women's World Cup (Spanish: Copa Mundial Femenina Sub-20 de la FIFA Costa Rica 2022) was the 10th edition of the FIFA U-20 Women's World Cup, the biennial international women's youth football championship contested by the under-20 national teams of the member associations of FIFA, since its inception in 2002 as the FIFA U-19 Women's World Championship (the age limit was raised from 19 to 20 in 2008). The tournament was held in Costa Rica, which would have hosted the 2020 edition before it was cancelled due to the COVID-19 pandemic. It was the second time that Costa Rica hosted a FIFA tournament after the 2014 FIFA U-17 Women's World Cup.

Japan were the defending champions. The opening match played at the tournament was contested between Costa Rica and Australia at Estadio Nacional de Costa Rica, San José. The final was held on 28 August 2022. For the third time in FIFA football tournaments, (Note: 1986 and 1990 FIFA World Cup finals, 2011 and 2015 FIFA Women's World Cup finals.) and the first time for the youth tournaments, there was a back-to-back final between the same two teams.

This was the final edition to feature 16 teams before expanded to 24 teams in 2024 in Colombia.

== Host selection ==
Costa Rica and Panama were originally selected as co-hosts of the 2020 FIFA U-20 Women's World Cup on 20 December 2019, before the withdrawal of Panama leaving Costa Rica as the only host country. On 17 November 2020, FIFA announced that the 2020 edition of the tournament would be cancelled due to the COVID-19 pandemic. Instead, Costa Rica was appointed a host of the next edition of the tournament scheduled for 2022.

== Qualified teams ==
A total of 16 teams qualify for the final tournament. In addition to Costa Rica who automatically qualifies as host, 15 teams qualify from six continental competitions.

Confederation	Qualifying tournament	Team	Appearance	Last appearance	Previous best performance
AFC (Asia) (3 teams)	Teams were nominated by AFC based on results of 2019 AFC U-19 Women's Championship (qualification cancelled)	Australia	4th	2006	Quarter-finals (2002, 2004)
AFC (Asia) (3 teams)	Teams were nominated by AFC based on results of 2019 AFC U-19 Women's Championship (qualification cancelled)	Japan	7th	2018	Champions (2018)
AFC (Asia) (3 teams)	Teams were nominated by AFC based on results of 2019 AFC U-19 Women's Championship (qualification cancelled)	South Korea	6th	2016	Third place (2010)
CAF (Africa) (2 teams)	2022 African U-20 Women's World Cup Qualifying Tournament	Ghana	6th	2018	Group stage (2010, 2012, 2014, 2016, 2018)
CAF (Africa) (2 teams)	2022 African U-20 Women's World Cup Qualifying Tournament	Nigeria	10th	2018	Runners-up (2010, 2014)
CONCACAF (Central, North America and Caribbean) (Hosts + 3 teams)	Host nation	Costa Rica	3rd	2014	Group stage (2010, 2014)
CONCACAF (Central, North America and Caribbean) (Hosts + 3 teams)	2022 CONCACAF Women's U-20 Championship	Canada	8th	2016	Runners-up (2002)
CONCACAF (Central, North America and Caribbean) (Hosts + 3 teams)	2022 CONCACAF Women's U-20 Championship	Mexico	9th	2018	Quarter-finals (2010, 2012, 2016)
CONCACAF (Central, North America and Caribbean) (Hosts + 3 teams)	2022 CONCACAF Women's U-20 Championship	United States	10th	2018	Champions (2002, 2008, 2012)
CONMEBOL (South America) (2 teams)	2022 South American U-20 Women's Championship	Brazil	10th	2018	Third place (2006)
CONMEBOL (South America) (2 teams)	2022 South American U-20 Women's Championship	Colombia	2nd	2010	Fourth place (2010)
OFC (Oceania) (1 team)	Team was nominated by OFC based on results of 2019 OFC U-19 Women's Championship (qualification cancelled)	New Zealand	8th	2018	Quarter-finals (2014)
UEFA (Europe) (4 teams)	Teams were nominated by UEFA based on 2020/21 UEFA Women's Under-19 Championship qualifying round coefficient ranking list (qualification cancelled)	France	8th	2018	Runners-up (2016)
UEFA (Europe) (4 teams)	Teams were nominated by UEFA based on 2020/21 UEFA Women's Under-19 Championship qualifying round coefficient ranking list (qualification cancelled)	Germany	10th	2018	Champions (2004, 2010, 2014)
UEFA (Europe) (4 teams)	Teams were nominated by UEFA based on 2020/21 UEFA Women's Under-19 Championship qualifying round coefficient ranking list (qualification cancelled)	Netherlands	2nd	2018	Quarter-finals (2018)
UEFA (Europe) (4 teams)	Teams were nominated by UEFA based on 2020/21 UEFA Women's Under-19 Championship qualifying round coefficient ranking list (qualification cancelled)	Spain	4th	2018	Runners-up (2018)

Notes

1. On 16 March 2022, the AFC announced that Australia would replace North Korea as the AFC’s representatives at the FIFA U-20 Women's World Cup due to DPR Korea Football Association withdrew.

== Venues ==
The two host cities were announced on 10 August 2021.

2022 FIFA U-20 Women's World Cup is located in Costa Rica	Alajuela	San José
2022 FIFA U-20 Women's World Cup is located in Costa Rica	Estadio Alejandro Morera Soto	Estadio Nacional de Costa Rica
2022 FIFA U-20 Women's World Cup is located in Costa Rica	Capacity: 17,895	Capacity: 35,175

== Draw ==
The official draw took place on 5 May 2022, 13:00 local time (UTC-6), at the Teatro Nacional de Costa Rica in San José. The teams were allocated based on their performances in the 5 previous U-20 Women's World Cups, five bonus points are added to each of the confederation's current champions that won the respective qualifying tournament (for this cycle).

The hosts Costa Rica were automatically seeded and assigned to position A1. Teams of the same confederation could not meet in the group stage.

Pot 1	Pot 2	Pot 3	Pot 4
Costa Rica ^{H} Germany; Japan; France	United States; Nigeria; Spain; Mexico	Brazil; South Korea; Ghana; New Zealand	Netherlands; Canada; Colombia; Australia

== Squads ==
Players born between 1 January 2002 and 31 December 2006 are eligible to compete in the tournament.

== Match officials ==
A total of 13 referees, 26 assistant referees and 14 video match officials (VAR and AVAR) were appointed officially by FIFA for the tournament on 1 June 2022.

The Video assistant referee (VAR) system would be utilized for the first time in a FIFA U-20 Women's World Cup.

Confederation	Referees	Assistant referees
AFC	(Australia) Lara Lee (South Korea) Kim Yu-jeong	(Kyrgyzstan) Ramina Tsoi (Palestine) Heba Saadieh (South Korea) Park Mi-suk (Vietnam) Trương Thị Lệ Trinh
CAF	(South Africa) Akhona Makalima (Togo) Vincentia Amedome	(Cameroon) Carine Atezambong (Mali) Fanta Kone (Nigeria) Mimisen Iyorhe (Zambia) Diana Chikotesha
CONCACAF	(Costa Rica) Marianela Araya (Mexico) Francia González (United States) Tori Penso	(Canada) Chantal Boudreau (Cuba) Ivette Santiago (Mexico) Enedina Caudillo (Mexico) Sandra Ramírez (Suriname) Mijensa Rensch (United States) Brooke Mayo
CONMEBOL	(Venezuela) Emikar Calderas	(Colombia) Mary Blanco (Venezuela) Migdalia Rodríguez
OFC	(New Zealand) Anna-Marie Keighley	(New Zealand) Sarah Jones (Samoa) Maria Salamasina
UEFA	(Finland) Lina Lehtovaara (Spain) Marta Huerta de Aza (Sweden) Tess Olofsson (Wales) Cheryl Foster	(Austria) Sara Telek (Cyprus) Polyxeni Irodotou (Estonia) Karolin Kaivoja (Hungary) Katalin Török (Poland) Katarzyna Wójs (Spain) Guadalupe Porras (Sweden) Almira Spahić (Switzerland) Susanne Küng

Confederation	Video assistant referee (VAR)
AFC	(Australia) Kate Jacewicz (Australia) Sarah Ho (AVAR)
CAF	(Morocco) Bouchra Karboubi (Morocco) Fatiha Jermoumi (AVAR)
CONCACAF	(Honduras) Melissa Borjas (Nicaragua) Tatiana Guzmán
CONMEBOL	(Argentina) Salomé di Iorio (Brazil) Daiane Muniz dos Santos (Chile) María Belén Carvajal
UEFA	(France) Maïka Vanderstichel (Switzerland) Esther Staubli (Belgium) Ella De Vries (AVAR) (England) Sian Massey (AVAR) (Spain) Eliana Fernández (AVAR)

Support referee
CONMEBOL	(Peru) Elizabeth Tintaya

== Group stage ==
The draw for the group stage took place on 5 May 2022.

=== Tiebreakers ===
The top two teams of each group advanced to the quarter-finals. The format for tiebreakers were determined as follows:

1. points obtained in all group matches;
2. goal difference in all group matches;
3. number of goals scored in all group matches;

If two or more teams were equal on the basis of the above three criteria, their rankings were determined as follows:

4. points obtained in the group matches between the teams concerned;
5. goal difference in the group matches between the teams concerned;
6. number of goals scored in the group matches between the teams concerned;
7. fair play points in all group matches:
  - first yellow card: minus 1 point;
  - indirect red card (second yellow card): minus 3 points;
  - direct red card: minus 4 points;
  - yellow card and direct red card: minus 5 points;
8. drawing of lots by the FIFA Organising Committee.

All times are local, CST (UTC–6).

=== Group A ===
Pos	Team	Pld	W	D	L	GF	GA	GD	Pts	Qualification
1	Spain	3	2	1	0	8	0	+8	7	Knockout stage
2	Brazil	3	2	1	0	7	0	+7	7	Knockout stage
3	Australia	3	1	0	2	3	6	−3	3	
4	Costa Rica (H)	3	0	0	3	1	13	−12	0	

Source: FIFA
Rules for classification: Group stage tiebreakers
(H) Hosts
10 August 2022
17:00

Spain	0–0	Brazil
	Report

Estadio Nacional de Costa Rica, San José
Attendance: 9,819
Referee: Tori Penso (United States)
10 August 2022
20:00

Costa Rica	1–3	Australia
Pinell 19'	Report	Hunter 37' (pen.); Henry 38'; Fenton 72'

Estadio Nacional de Costa Rica, San José
Attendance: 22,506
Referee: Tess Olofsson (Sweden)

13 August 2022
14:00 (Note: The match was interrupted at the 28 minute and resumed 77 minutes later due to adverse weather conditions.)

Brazil	2–0	Australia
Priscila 26'; Aline 46'	Report

Estadio Alejandro Morera Soto, Alajuela
Attendance: 1,759
Referee: Cheryl Foster (Wales)
13 August 2022
20:00

Costa Rica	0–5	Spain
	Report	Majarín 26'; Mingueza 33'; Gabarro 62' (pen.); Elexpuru 74'; Paralluelo 90+4'

Estadio Nacional de Costa Rica, San José
Attendance: 22,446
Referee: Emikar Calderas (Venezuela)

16 August 2022
20:00

Brazil	5–0	Costa Rica
Rafa Levis 27', 53' (pen.); Pati Maldaner 63'; Aline 75'; Mileninha 88' (pen.)	Report

Estadio Nacional de Costa Rica, San José
Attendance: 11,923
Referee: Lina Lehtovaara (Finland)
16 August 2022
20:00

Australia	0–3	Spain
	Report	Gabarro 19', 24', 61'

Estadio Alejandro Morera Soto, Alajuela
Attendance: 939
Referee: Francia González (Mexico)

=== Group B ===
Pos	Team	Pld	W	D	L	GF	GA	GD	Pts	Qualification
1	Colombia	3	1	2	0	3	2	+1	5	Knockout stage
2	Mexico	3	1	2	0	2	1	+1	5	Knockout stage
3	Germany	3	1	0	2	3	2	+1	3	
4	New Zealand	3	0	2	1	3	6	−3	2	

Source: FIFA
Rules for classification: Group stage tiebreakers
10 August 2022
11:00

Germany	0–1	Colombia
	Report	Muñoz 87'

Estadio Alejandro Morera Soto, Alajuela
Attendance: 1,158
Referee: Marianela Araya (Costa Rica)
10 August 2022
14:00

New Zealand	1–1	Mexico
Cázares 31' (o.g.)	Report	Vázquez 45'

Estadio Alejandro Morera Soto, Alajuela
Attendance: 1,007
Referee: Kim Yu-jeong (South Korea)

13 August 2022
11:00

Germany	3–0	New Zealand
Fröhlich 58'; Weidauer 64' (pen.); Corley 90+4'	Report

Estadio Alejandro Morera Soto, Alajuela
Attendance: 1,391
Referee: Vincentia Amedome (Togo)
13 August 2022
17:00

Mexico	0–0	Colombia
	Report

Estadio Nacional de Costa Rica, San José
Attendance: 9,336
Referee: Tess Olofsson (Sweden)

16 August 2022
17:00

Colombia	2–2	New Zealand
L. Caicedo 10', 63'	Report	Clegg 3'; Lancaster 71'

Estadio Nacional de Costa Rica, San José
Attendance: 3,378
Referee: Tori Penso (United States)
16 August 2022
17:00

Mexico	1–0	Germany
Villanueva 59'	Report

Estadio Alejandro Morera Soto, Alajuela
Attendance: 1,218
Referee: Akhona Makalima (South Africa)

=== Group C ===
Pos	Team	Pld	W	D	L	GF	GA	GD	Pts	Qualification
1	Nigeria	3	3	0	0	5	1	+4	9	Knockout stage
2	France	3	2	0	1	4	2	+2	6	Knockout stage
3	South Korea	3	1	0	2	2	2	0	3	
4	Canada	3	0	0	3	2	8	−6	0	

Source: FIFA
Rules for classification: Group stage tiebreakers
11 August 2022
17:00 (Note: The match was interrupted at the 21 minute and resumed 1 hour later due to adverse weather conditions.)

France	0–1	Nigeria
	Report	Sabastine 85'

Estadio Nacional de Costa Rica, San José
Attendance: 723
Referee: Francia González (Mexico)
11 August 2022
20:30

Canada	0–2	South Korea
	Report	Courtnall 53' (o.g.); Mun Ha-yeon 62'

Estadio Nacional de Costa Rica, San José
Attendance: 839
Referee: Lina Lehtovaara (Finland)

14 August 2022
15:15

South Korea	0–1	Nigeria
	Report	Onyenezide 83'

Estadio Alejandro Morera Soto, Alajuela
Attendance: 482
Referee: Marta Huerta de Aza (Spain)
14 August 2022
20:00

France	3–1	Canada
Folquet 51', 66'; Mbakem-Niaro 89'	Report	Smith 90+6'

Estadio Nacional de Costa Rica, San José
Attendance: 1,327
Referee: Anna-Marie Keighley (New Zealand)

17 August 2022
20:00

South Korea	0–1	France
	Report	Mbakem-Niaro 74'

Estadio Nacional de Costa Rica, San José
Attendance: 979
Referee: Vincentia Amedome (Togo)
17 August 2022
20:00

Nigeria	3–1	Canada
Onyenezide 24' (pen.), 32' (pen.); Olise 90+1'	Report	Novak 2'

Estadio Alejandro Morera Soto, Alajuela
Attendance: 973
Referee: Lara Lee (Australia)

=== Group D ===
Pos	Team	Pld	W	D	L	GF	GA	GD	Pts	Qualification
1	Japan	3	3	0	0	6	1	+5	9	Knockout stage
2	Netherlands	3	2	0	1	7	2	+5	6	Knockout stage
3	United States	3	1	0	2	4	6	−2	3	
4	Ghana	3	0	0	3	1	9	−8	0	

Source: FIFA
Rules for classification: Group stage tiebreakers
11 August 2022
11:00

Ghana	0–3	United States
	Report	Cooper 11'; Thompson 38'; Sentnor 51'

Estadio Alejandro Morera Soto, Alajuela
Attendance: 987
Referee: Lara Lee (Australia)
11 August 2022
14:00

Japan	1–0	Netherlands
Yamamoto 23'	Report

Estadio Alejandro Morera Soto, Alajuela
Attendance: 877
Referee: Akhona Makalima (South Africa)

14 August 2022
11:00

Japan	2–0	Ghana
Hamano 62' (pen.), 73' (pen.)	Report

Estadio Alejandro Morera Soto, Alajuela
Attendance: 765
Referee: Marianela Araya (Costa Rica)
14 August 2022
17:00

United States	0–3	Netherlands
	Report	Koopman 32'; Foederer 55'; Auée 62' (pen.)

Estadio Nacional de Costa Rica, San José
Attendance: 2,652
Referee: Kim Yu-jeong (South Korea)

17 August 2022
17:00

United States	1–3	Japan
Jackson 70'	Report	Matsukubo 55'; Koyama 67'; Tabata 84'

Estadio Alejandro Morera Soto, Alajuela
Attendance: 1,392
Referee: Marta Huerta de Aza (Spain)
17 August 2022
17:00

Netherlands	4–1	Ghana
Rijsbergen 28', 65'; Henry 51'; Auée 84' (pen.)	Report	Boaduwaa 53'

Estadio Nacional de Costa Rica, San José
Attendance: 814
Referee: Emikar Calderas (Venezuela)

== Knockout stage ==
In the knockout stages, if a match was level at the end of normal playing time, extra time would be played (two periods of 15 minutes each) and followed, if necessary, by a penalty shoot-out to determine the winner. However, for the third place match, no extra time will be played and the winner will be determined by a penalty shoot-out if necessary.

=== Bracket ===
Quarter-finals
20 August – San José
Spain	1
Mexico	0
21 August – Alajuela
Nigeria	0
Netherlands	2
20 August – San José
Colombia	0
Brazil	1
21 August – Alajuela
Japan (p)	3 (5)
France	3 (3)

Semi-finals
25 August – San José
Spain	2
Netherlands	1
25 August – San José
Brazil	1
Japan	2

Final
28 August – San José
Spain	3
Japan	1
Third place
28 August – San José
Netherlands	1
Brazil	4

=== Quarter-finals ===
20 August 2022
16:30

Spain	1–0	Mexico
Gabarro 25'	Report

Estadio Nacional de Costa Rica, San José
Attendance: 4,914
Referee: Kim Yu-jeong (South Korea)

20 August 2022
20:00

Colombia	0–1	Brazil
	Report	Tarciane 26' (pen.)

Estadio Nacional de Costa Rica, San José
Attendance: 7,874
Referee: Cheryl Foster (Wales)

21 August 2022
16:30

Nigeria	0–2	Netherlands
	Report	Hulswit 11'; Henry 33'

Estadio Alejandro Morera Soto, Alajuela
Attendance: 3,005
Referee: Marianela Araya (Costa Rica)

21 August 2022
20:00

Japan	3–3 (a.e.t.)	France
Yamamoto 33' (pen.); Hamano 48'; Fujino 120+5' (pen.)	Report	Folquet 15'; Mbakem-Niaro 85'; Hoeltzel 110'
Penalties
Oyama (penalty scored); Koyama (penalty scored); Fujino (penalty scored); Shimada (penalty scored); Tabata (penalty scored)	5–3	(penalty missed) Fazer; (penalty scored) Sombath; (penalty scored) Mbakem-Niaro; (penalty scored) Le Guilly

Estadio Alejandro Morera Soto, Alajuela
Attendance: 2,979
Referee: Emikar Calderas (Venezuela)

=== Semi-finals ===
25 August 2022
16:30

Spain	2–1	Netherlands
Gabarro 22', 25'	Report	Van Gool 54'

Estadio Nacional de Costa Rica, San José
Attendance: 4,054
Referee: Tori Penso (United States)

25 August 2022
20:00

Brazil	1–2	Japan
Cris 55'	Report	Yamamoto 30'; Hamano 84'

Estadio Nacional de Costa Rica, San José
Attendance: 6,571
Referee: Tess Olofsson (Sweden)

=== Third place match ===
28 August 2022
16:30

Netherlands	1–4	Brazil
Van Gool 21'	Report	Ana Clara 9'; Tarciane 59', 79' (pen.); Gi Fernandes 89'

Estadio Nacional de Costa Rica, San José
Attendance: 15,672
Referee: Vincentia Amedome (Togo)

=== Final ===
The 2022 final is a rematch of the 2018 final, the previous final.

28 August 2022
20:00 UTC-6

Spain	3–1	Japan
Gabarro 12'; Paralluelo 22', 27' (pen.)	Report	Amano 47'

Estadio Nacional de Costa Rica, San José
Attendance: 29,891
Referee: Emikar Calderas (Venezuela)

2022 FIFA U-20 Women's World Cup winners

Spain
First title

== Awards ==
The following awards were given for the tournament:

Golden Ball	Silver Ball	Bronze Ball
(Japan) Maika Hamano	(Spain) Inma Gabarro	(Brazil) Tarciane
Golden Boot	Silver Boot	Bronze Boot
(Spain) Inma Gabarro	(Japan) Maika Hamano	(Japan) Yuzuki Yamamoto
8 goals	4 goals	3 goals, 3 assists
Golden Glove
(Spain) Txell Font
FIFA Fair Play Award
Japan

== Goalscorers ==
There were 86 goals scored in 32 matches, for an average of 2.69 goals per match.

8 goals

- (Spain) Inma Gabarro

4 goals

- (Japan) Maika Hamano

3 goals

- (Brazil) Tarciane
- (France) Magnaba Folquet
- (France) Esther Mbakem-Niaro
- (Japan) Yuzuki Yamamoto
- (Nigeria) Esther Onyenezide
- (Spain) Salma Paralluelo

2 goals

- (Brazil) Aline
- (Brazil) Rafa Levis
- (Colombia) Linda Caicedo
- (Netherlands) Marit Auée
- (Netherlands) Rosa van Gool
- (Netherlands) Ziva Henry
- (Netherlands) Liz Rijsbergen

1 goal

- (Australia) Kirsty Fenton
- (Australia) Bryleeh Henry
- (Australia) Sarah Hunter
- (Brazil) Ana Clara
- (Brazil) Cris
- (Brazil) Gi Fernandes
- (Brazil) Mileninha
- (Brazil) Pati Maldaner
- (Brazil) Priscila
- (Canada) Kaila Novak
- (Canada) Olivia Smith
- (Colombia) Mariana Muñoz
- (Costa Rica) Alexandra Pinell
- (France) Mégane Hoeltzel
- (Germany) Gia Corley
- (Germany) Clara Fröhlich
- (Germany) Sophie Weidauer
- (Ghana) Doris Boaduwaa
- (Japan) Suzu Amano
- (Japan) Aoba Fujino
- (Japan) Shinomi Koyama
- (Japan) Manaka Matsukubo
- (Japan) Haruna Tabata
- (Mexico) Anette Vázquez
- (Mexico) Alexia Villanueva
- (Netherlands) Dana Foederer
- (Netherlands) Zera Hulswit
- (Netherlands) Sanne Koopman
- (New Zealand) Emily Clegg
- (New Zealand) Charlotte Lancaster
- (Nigeria) Chioma Olise
- (Nigeria) Flourish Sabastine
- (South Korea) Mun Ha-yeon
- (Spain) Ane Elexpuru
- (Spain) Sonia Majarín
- (Spain) Ariadna Mingueza
- (United States) Michelle Cooper
- (United States) Simone Jackson
- (United States) Ally Sentnor
- (United States) Alyssa Thompson

1 own goal

- (Canada) Brooklyn Courtnall (against South Korea)
- (Mexico) Carol Cázares (against New Zealand)

== Marketing ==
=== Branding ===
The official emblem and slogan were unveiled on 10 August 2021, one year prior to the start of the tournament.

"Vamos juntas" by Isabella Castro, Rebeca Malavassi, Tony Succar and the female choir of the Franz Liszt Schule served as the official song of the tournament. (Produced and composed by Costa Rican artist Jorge Castro).
