= Salma Paralluelo =

Spanish footballer (born 2003)

- Paralluelo with Spain in 2026

Personal information
- Full name: Salma Celeste Paralluelo Ayingono
- Date of birth: 13 November 2003 (age 22)
- Place of birth: Zaragoza, Spain
- Height: 1.74 m (5 ft 9 in)
- Position: Forward

Team information
- Current team: OL Lyonnes
- Number: 77

Youth career
- San José
- Zaragoza CFF

Senior career*
Years	Team	Apps	(Gls)
- Zaragoza CFF B
- Zaragoza CFF
2019–2022	Villarreal	37	(23)
2022–2026	Barcelona	75	(44)
2026–	OL Lyonnes	4	(2)

International career^{‡}
2018–2019	Spain U17	20	(9)
2022	Spain U19	3	(1)
2022	Spain U20	5	(3)
2022–	Spain	53	(16)
Medal record
Women's football
Representing Spain
FIFA Women's World Cup
Winner	2023 Australia–New Zealand
UEFA Women's Championship
Runner-up	2025 Switzerland
UEFA Women's Nations League
Winner	2024 France–Netherlands–Spain
FIFA U-20 Women's World Cup
Winner	2022 Costa Rica
FIFA U-17 Women's World Cup
Winner	2018 Uruguay
UEFA Women's Under-17 Championship
Winner	2018 Lithuania
Women's athletics
Representing Spain
European Youth Olympic Festival
Gold medal – first place	2019 Baku	400 m hurdles
Gold medal – first place	2019 Baku	Medley relay
- * Club domestic league appearances and goals as of 22:53, 19 October 2026 (UTC) ‡ National team caps and goals as of 04:10, 19 October 2026 (UTC)

Salma Celeste Paralluelo Ayingono (Spanish pronunciation: [ˈsalma θeˈleste paɾaˈʎwelo aʝiŋˈɡono]; born 13 November 2003) is a Spanish professional footballer and former sprinter who plays as a forward for Première Ligue club OL Lyonnes and the Spain national team. She is the first ever player to have won all three World Cups, having won the 2023 FIFA World Cup, 2022 FIFA U-20 World Cup, and 2018 FIFA U-17 World Cup.

== Early life ==
Paralluelo was born in Zaragoza to a Spanish father and an Equatorial Guinean Fang mother. Her mother had moved from Equatorial Guinea so that her son, Florencio, from a previous relationship, who had a severe congenital vision deficiency, could receive better medical treatment in Spain. She has two other brothers, José Jaime and Lorenzo, both footballers.

She was raised in a working class neighbourhood in Zaragoza with her three older brothers. She began playing football with classmates as a young child. Her father lost his job during her early childhood, which worsened her family's financial position. Her mother later moved to Switzerland for work and had limited contact with Paralluelo, who remained in Spain and was raised primarily by her father. Paralluelo saw her mother during Christmas and summer holidays for most of her childhood. Her father described her as a student who passed her classes but was not "brilliant". She is close friends with triple jump bronze Olympic medalist, Ana Peleteiro, whom she met during her athletics career as a teenager.

In December 2012, her older half-brother, Florencio, disappeared while going to meet with friends from his university. His body was found in a reservoir 35 days later in the Ebro River in Zaragoza. No violence or foul play was suspected in his death. Paralluelo participated in sports to cope with her brother's death.

== Club career ==
Paralluelo is a product of UD San José in Zaragoza. She has played for Zaragoza CFF and Villarreal in Spain. She is also a 2022 FIFA Puskás Award nominee.

Paralluelo signed for FC Barcelona at the end of the 2021–22 season, after her contract with Villarreal ended. In the 2023–24 season, she scored four goals in the 7–1 away win against Real Sociedad, one of two "pokers" on her way to being Barcelona's top goalscorer in all competitions (Caroline Graham Hansen eventually took the league Pichichi title) as the team won four trophies. Still struggling in some tougher games, her growth as a footballer "made leaps" in the season. On 23 May 2026, she scored two late goals in a 4–0 victory over Lyon in the Champions League final, sealing her club's fourth title in the competition. A month later, on 30 June, Paralluelo left Barcelona after her contract expired, having won 15 titles with the club.

On 25 July 2026, French club OL Lyonnes announced the signing of Paralluelo to a four-year contract until 2030.

== International career ==
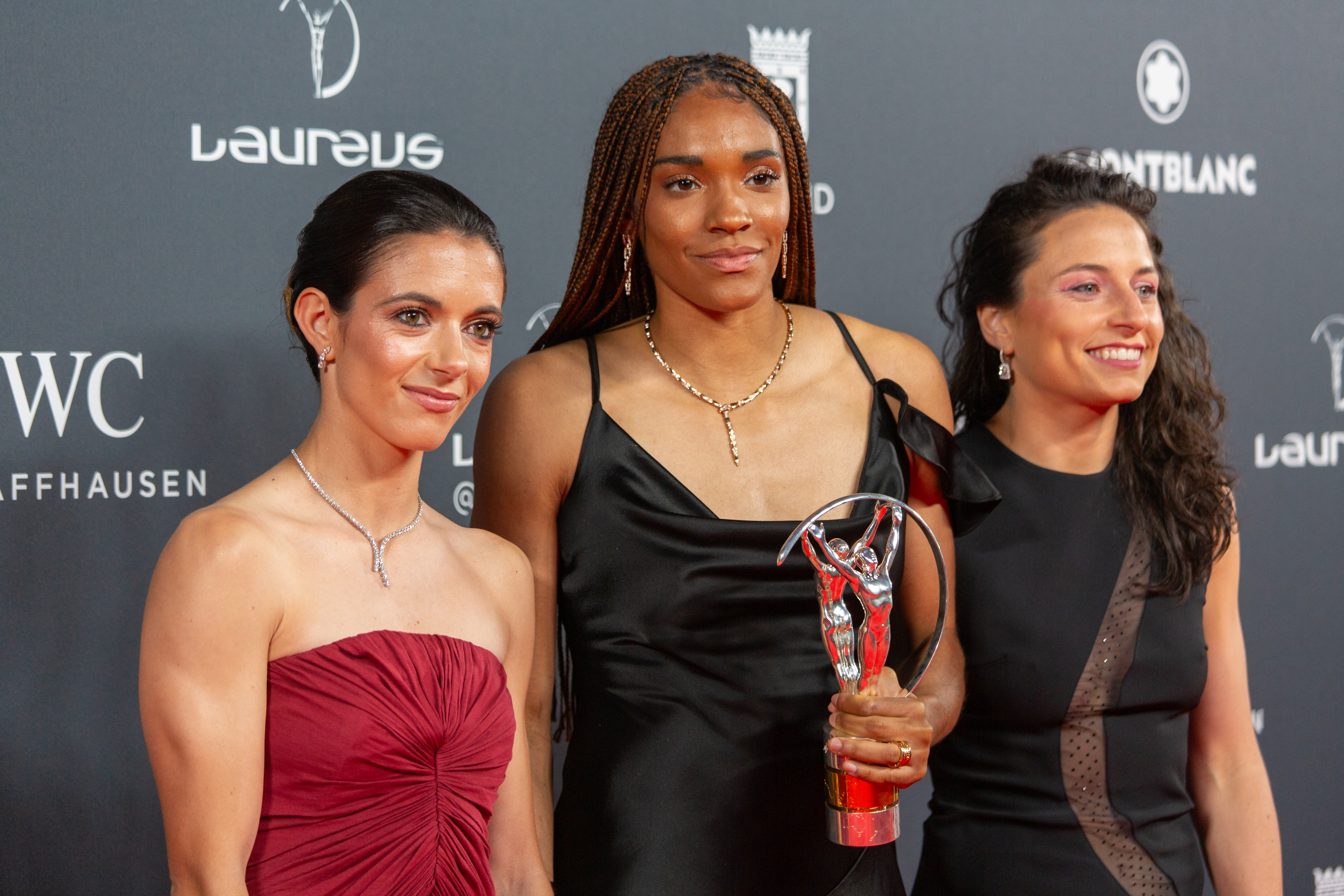
Paralluelo (centre) with Spain teammates Aitana Bonmatí (left) and Ivana Andrés at the 2024 Laureus World Sports Awards

Paralluelo won the 2018 UEFA Under-17 Championship and the 2018 FIFA U-17 World Cup. In April 2021, her anterior cruciate ligament was torn during a match.

She returned to win the 2022 FIFA U-20 World Cup. She made her senior debut on 11 November 2022, starting and scoring a hat-trick in a 7-0 friendly home win over Argentina.

She was included in the Spain squad list for the 2023 World Cup. During the quarter-final match against the Netherlands on 11 August, she scored the winning goal in a 2–1 victory after extra time, to qualify Spain for the first time in history into the semi-finals of a World Cup.

On 15 August 2023, she scored a goal in Spain's 2–1 victory over Sweden to take her team to its first senior World Cup final. After winning the final against England, in which she played as a starter, she was proclaimed the best young player of the tournament.

In October 2024, she announced that she would take an indefinite break from football due to physical and mental fatigue. She made 92 appearances with the Spanish national team and Spanish football clubs in just two years from 2022 to 2024.

In June 2025, she was called up by the Spanish national team for the UEFA Euro 2025 tournament in Switzerland.

== Athletics ==
As an athlete, Paralluelo began her career at the San José Athletics club in Zaragoza. She won the Jean Bouin road race in Barcelona from 2012 to 2016 in her age group. In June 2016, Paralluelo participated for the first time in the Spanish championships in her age group (U14) and won three disciplines (80 meters hurdles, shot put, 80 meters). In 2017, she won the 60 meters hurdles at the U16 Spanish Indoor Championships and finished sixth in the 100 meters hurdles at the U16 National Outdoor Championships that summer.

She joined the Scorpio-71 club, the largest athletics club in Zaragoza. In 2018, Paralluelo won the 300 meters at the Spanish U16 Indoor Championships in 39.46 s and finished second in the triple jump (12.06 meters) on the same day. At her age group outdoor championships in July, she broke the all-time Spanish record in the non-Olympic 300 meters hurdles discipline with a winning time of 42.56.

In the outdoor season, in the third race of her life over the 400 meters hurdles, during the Ibero-American Athletics Meeting in Huelva, Paralluelo ran a time of 57.43, beating the all-time best Spanish sub-18 record and also breaking that year’s sub-18 world best time. With this result she was also qualified for the 2019 European Youth Summer Olympic Festival, where she won two gold medals in the 400m hurdles event, with a time of 57.95, and the medley relay.

In late 2019 she went to Playas de Castellón. She won her first senior medal at the 2019 Spanish Indoor Athletics Championships, winning bronze in the 400-meter test with a mark of 53.83s, a Spanish national record in the sub-18 and sub-20 categories. Her result also allowed her to participate in the 2019 European Athletics Indoor Championships. At the age of 15 years and 108 days, she was the second youngest ever participant in a total of 35 European Indoor Championships, only behind Norwegian race walker Kjersti Tysse (15 years and 34 days in the 1987 edition).

In July 2022, after signing a contract with FC Barcelona, Salma Paralluelo announced that she wanted to focus solely on football in the future, thus retiring her career in athletics.

== Career statistics ==
=== Club ===
As of match played 17 October 2026

Appearances and goals by club, season and competition
Club	Season	League			National cup (Note: Includes Copa de la Reina)		Continental		Other		Total	
Club	Season	Division	Apps	Goals	Apps	Goals	Apps	Goals	Apps	Goals	Apps	Goals
Villarreal	2019–20	Segunda División Pro	12	5	0	0	—		—		12	5
Villarreal	2020–21	Segunda División Pro	17	15	0	0	—		—		17	15
Villarreal	2021–22	Primera División	8	3	1	0	—		—		9	3
Villarreal	Total		37	23	1	0	—		—		38	23
Barcelona	2022–23	Liga F	18	11	1	2	9 (Note: Appearances in UEFA Women's Champions League)	1	2 (Note: Appearances in Supercopa de España)	1	30	15
Barcelona	2023–24	Liga F	19	20	4	4	11	6	2	4	36	34
Barcelona	2024–25	Liga F	17	7	5	2	7	4	2	0	31	13
Barcelona	2025–26	Liga F	21	6	4	2	7	4	2	0	34	12
Barcelona	Total		75	44	13	10	33	15	8	5	131	74
OL Lyonnes	2026–27	Première Ligue	4	2	0	0	2	0	0	0	6	2
Career total			116	69	14	10	35	15	8	5	175	99

=== International ===
As of match played 13 October 2026

Appearances and goals by national team and year
National team	Year	Apps	Goals
Spain	2022	2	3
Spain	2023	16	6
Spain	2024	13	4
Spain	2025	14	1
Spain	2026	8	2
Total		53	16

Scores and results list Spain's goal tally first, score column indicates score after each Paralluelo goal.

List of international goals scored by Salma Paralluelo
No.	Date	Venue	Opponent	Score	Result	Competition
1	11 November 2022	Estadio Municipal Álvarez Claro, Melilla, Spain	Argentina	3–0	7–0	Friendly
2	11 November 2022	Estadio Municipal Álvarez Claro, Melilla, Spain	Argentina	4–0	7–0	Friendly
3	11 November 2022	Estadio Municipal Álvarez Claro, Melilla, Spain	Argentina	5–0	7–0	Friendly
4	6 April 2023	Estadi Municipal de Can Misses, Ibiza, Spain	Norway	3–1	4–2	Friendly
5	6 April 2023	Estadi Municipal de Can Misses, Ibiza, Spain	Norway	4–1	4–2	Friendly
6	5 July 2023	Gladsaxe Stadium, Gladsaxe, Denmark	Denmark	2–0	2–0	Friendly
7	11 August 2023	Wellington Regional Stadium, Wellington, New Zealand	Netherlands	2–1	2–1	2023 FIFA Women's World Cup
8	15 August 2023	Eden Park, Auckland, New Zealand	Sweden	1–0	2–1	2023 FIFA Women's World Cup
9	5 December 2023	La Rosaleda Stadium, Málaga, Spain	Sweden	1–1	5–3	2023–24 UEFA Women's Nations League
10	5 April 2024	Den Dreef, Leuven, Belgium	Belgium	1–0	7–0	UEFA Women's Euro 2025 qualifying
11	5 April 2024	Den Dreef, Leuven, Belgium	Belgium	3–0	7–0	UEFA Women's Euro 2025 qualifying
12	5 April 2024	Den Dreef, Leuven, Belgium	Belgium	4–0	7–0	UEFA Women's Euro 2025 qualifying
13	6 August 2024	Stade Vélodrome, Marseille, France	Brazil	2–4	2–4	2024 Summer Olympics
14	8 April 2025	Balaídos, Vigo, Spain	Portugal	1–0	7–1	2025 UEFA Women's Nations League
15	9 June 2026	Laugardalsvöllur, Reykjavík, Iceland	Iceland	3–0	6–1	2027 FIFA Women's World Cup qualification
16	13 October 2026	Subaru Park, Chester, United States	United States	2–0	2–2	Friendly

== Honours ==
FC Barcelona

- Primera División: 2022–23, 2023–24, 2024–25, 2025–26
- Copa de la Reina: 2023–24, 2024–25, 2025–26
- Supercopa de España: 2022–23, 2023–24, 2024–25, 2025–26
- UEFA Women's Champions League: 2022–23, 2023–24, 2025–26
- Copa Catalunya: 2024–25

Spain

- FIFA Women's World Cup: 2023
- UEFA Women's Championship runner-up: 2025
- UEFA Women's Nations League: 2023–24

Spain U20

- FIFA U-20 Women's World Cup: 2022

Spain U17

- FIFA U-17 Women's World Cup: 2018
- UEFA Women's Under-17 Championship: 2018

Individual

- FIFA Women's World Cup Young Player Award: 2023
- 433 – Women's Talent of the Year: 2022–23
- Hija Predilecta de Zaragoza (2023)
- Ballon d'Or 3rd place: 2023, 2024
- IFFHS Women's World's Best Youth Player: 2023
- IFFHS Women's World Team of the Year: 2023, 2024
- IFFHS Women's UEFA Team: 2023, 2024
- IFFHS Women's Youth (U20) UEFA Team: 2023
- Laureus World Sports Award for Breakthrough of the Year Nominee: 2024
- The Best FIFA Women's 11: 2024

=== Records ===
Currently, Salma Paralluelo holds the following Spanish records in different age categories:

==== Under-18 ====
- 300m (38.60)
- 300m hurdles (41.97)
- 400m hurdles (57.36)
- Medley relay (2:08.53, with Laura Pintiel, Esperança Cladera, and Carmen Avilés)
- 400m indoor track (53.83)

==== Under-16 ====
- 300m hurdles (42.56)
- 300m indoor track (39.27)
