= 1986 World Junior Championships in Athletics – Women's 5000 metres walk =

The women's 5000 metres walk event at the 1986 World Junior Championships in Athletics was held in Athens, Greece, at Olympic Stadium on 20 July.

== Medalists ==
Gold	Wang Yan; China
Silver	Natalya Zykova; Soviet Union
Bronze	Jin Bingyie; China

== Results ==
=== Final ===
20 July

Rank	Name	Nationality	Time	Notes
1st place, gold medalist(s)	Wang Yan	China	22:03.65	
2nd place, silver medalist(s)	Natalya Zykova	Soviet Union	22:17.76	
3rd place, bronze medalist(s)	Jin Bingyie	China	22:17.83	
4	Mari Cruz Díaz	Spain	23:07.66	
5	Kjersti Tysse	Norway	23:09.99	
6	Emilia Cano	Spain	23:18.05	
7	Gabrielle Blythe	Australia	23:56.56	
8	Mihaela Daogaroiu	Romania	24:06.24	
9	Atanaska Dzhivkova	Bulgaria	24:25.27	
10	Sabine Desmet	Belgium	24:35.23	
11	Barbara Niewojt	Poland	24:36.09	
12	Aleyna Narbey	Australia	24:37.96	
13	Julie Drake	United Kingdom	24:39.11	
14	Lora Rigutto	Canada	24:42.65	
15	Olimpiada Ivanova	Soviet Union	25:01.87	
16	Cinzia Agnolon	Italy	25:20.88	
17	Kerry Bratton	United States	25:23.02	
18	Kathrin Born	East Germany	25:31.67	
19	Beata Betlej	Poland	25:36.88	
20	Magdalena Pettersson	Sweden	26:08.55	
21	Victoria Lawrence	United Kingdom	26:36.70	
22	Edith Montpetit	Canada	26:44.00	
23	Sybil Perez	United States	26:58.13	
24	Ele Katehou	Greece	27:48.59	

== Participation ==
According to an unofficial count, 24 athletes from 16 countries participated in the event.

- Australia (2)
- Belgium (1)
- Bulgaria (1)
- Canada (2)
- China (2)
- East Germany (1)
- Greece (1)
- Italy (1)
- Norway (1)
- Poland (2)
- Romania (1)
- Soviet Union (2)
- Spain (2)
- Sweden (1)
- United Kingdom (2)
- United States (2)
