= China–Costa Rica relations =

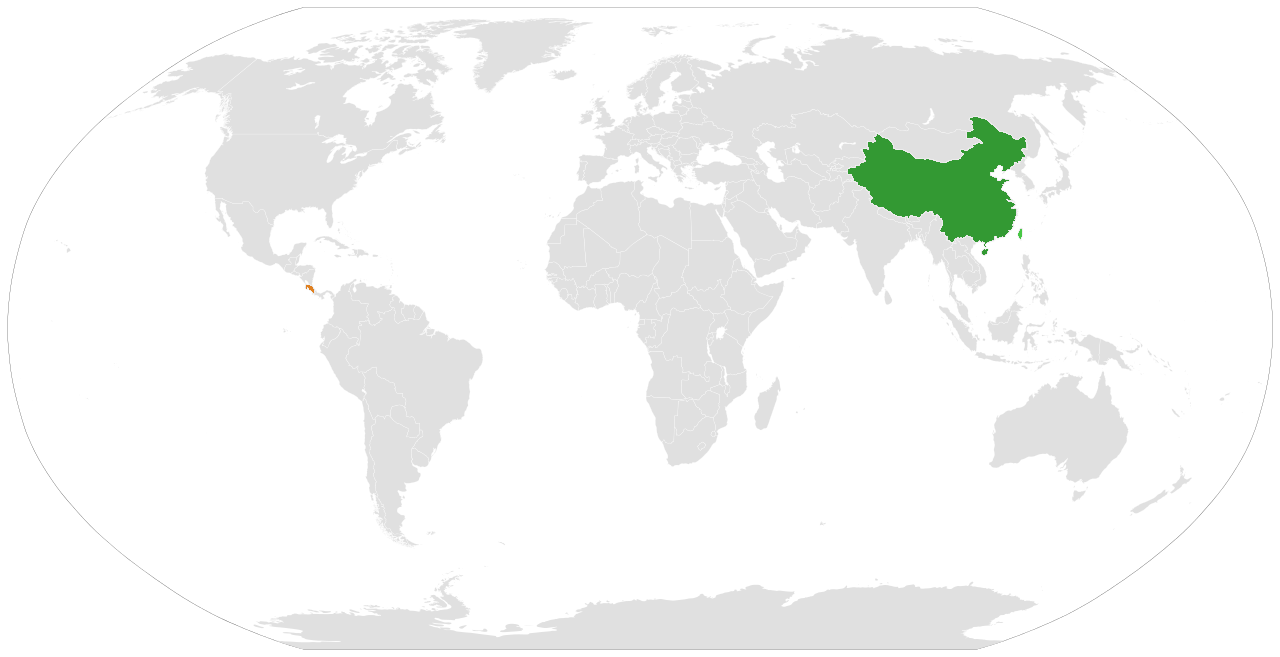

- China: Costa Rica

Costa Rica was the first Latin American state to change from recognising the Republic of China (Taiwan) as the legitimate government of China, to the People's Republic of China (PRC), supporting their One China policy.

== History ==
In June 2007, Costa Rica, motivated by the belief that recognising China would lead to increased foreign investment and economic growth, ended diplomatic relations with Taiwan, in favour of recognising the PRC as the true government of China. Costa Rica was the first Latin American state to switch recognition, marking a "turning point" for China's involvement in the region.

== Military and policing ==
In 2016, China donated two Harbin Y-12 aircraft to Costa Rica's unofficial air force, the Air Vigilance Service. A USD $25 million training facility for the Public Force of Costa Rica, the national police, was funded by China. In 2021, 100 motorcycles, and 2,000 helmets and Kevlar vests were delivered by the PRC to Costa Rica.

== Trade and investment ==
In 2007, Costa Rican President Óscar Arias requested that during a state visit to China that China fund a stadium for Costa Rica. China financed and built the Estadio Nacional de Costa Rica, which it completed in March 2011.

Costa Rica and China signed a free trade agreement in 2010. In 2018, Costa Rica joined the Belt and Road Initiative.

In 2021, Costa Rican exports to China were worth US$308 million, and Chinese foreign direct investment was worth US$600,000.

== Disputes ==
Chinese telecommunication company Huawei is the principal supplier to the Costa Rican Electricity Institute (ICE), accumulating a total of $266 million in contracts. Huawei was previously fined for non-compliance with contractual obligations to ICE by the Costa Rican government. In December 2024, Costa Rican president Rodrigo Chaves Robles filed a criminal complaint against Huawei and former ICE officials.

According to an August 2023 decree on 5G network development, Costa Rica barred firms from all countries that have not signed the Budapest Convention on Cybercrime. The decree affected Chinese firms like Huawei, as well as firms from South Korea, Russia and Brazil, among others. China is pursuing legal action in response to the decree so that it can bid on government contracts in Costa Rica.

In December 2024, Costa Rica and the U.S. issued a joint statement regarding cyber-intrusions into Costa Rican infrastructure originating from China. The Chinese embassy in San Jose rejected allegations of cyber-intrusions.

== Bilateral meetings ==
In November 2008, the General Secretary of the Chinese Communist Party, Hu Jintao, visited Costa Rica, and alongside president Óscar Arias announced the launch of free trade negotiations.

In July 2014, General Secretary of the Chinese Communist Party Xi Jinping met with Costa Rican president Luis Guillermo Solís in Brasília.

In June 2022, Qiu Xiaoqi, the Special Representative of the Chinese Government on Latin American Affairs, visited Costa Rica. During Qiu's visit, he met with the president of Costa Rica, Rodrigo Chaves, and other key Costa Rican government figures.
