= Anhui Foreign Economic Construction Group =

Chinese construction and mining company

Anhui Hua'an Foreign Economic Construction (Group) Co., Ltd.
- Native name: 安徽省华安外经建设（集团）有限公司
- Formerly: Anhui Foreign Economic Construction (Group) Co., Ltd. (until 2021)
- Type: Private
- Industry: Civil engineering, mining
- Founded: 1992
- Fate: Court-supervised bankruptcy reorganisation (2020–present)
- Headquarters: Hefei, Anhui, China,
- Area served: Worldwide
- Website: www.afecc.com

Anhui Hua'an Foreign Economic Construction Group (Chinese: 安徽省华安外经建设（集团）有限公司) is a Chinese construction and mining contractor headquartered in Hefei, Anhui. The company operates overseas engineering, procurement and construction (EPC) projects and develops mineral resources, notably diamonds. It has been in court-supervised reorganisation since December 2020 following a series of bond defaults in 2019.

== History ==
The company was founded in Hefei in 1992. In 2011 Engineering News-Record ranked it among the world's top 225 international contractors. After years of rapid expansion financed largely by domestic bonds, the group defaulted on RMB 6.7 billion of notes in June 2019, forcing creditors to petition for restructuring. The Hefei Intermediate People's Court accepted a consolidated bankruptcy-reorganisation application on 25 December 2020, placing the parent company and eleven affiliates under administrator control. In January 2021 the firm updated its registered name to "Anhui Hua'an Foreign Economic Construction (Group) Co., Ltd." The court approved a restructuring plan on 30 November 2022, allowing the company to enter the execution phase under continued supervision. Disclosure issues persisted, and in November 2024 the Shanghai Stock Exchange publicly reprimanded the group for failing to file its 2023 bond report while still in reorganisation. An updated debt-settlement draft circulated in January 2025, but the outcome of the workout remains pending.

== Major overseas projects ==
- Costa Rica – Built the National Stadium of Costa Rica (completed 2011).
- Democratic Republic of the Congo – Formed a 50:50 venture with the government to develop a diamond mine in Kasaï-Oriental; commitments included a US$61 million signing bonus and US$100 million in supporting infrastructure.
- Mozambique – Built the Estádio do Zimpeto and the cargo terminal at Maputo International Airport; marketing a US$400 million EPC contract for the Chibuto titanium-zircon mine.
- Zimbabwe – Through the joint venture Anjin with Matt Bronze Enterprises (Zimbabwe Defence Forces), mined diamonds in the Marange fields (2010–2016); operations paused after a government order and have resumed intermittently.

== Corporate citizenship ==
In 2011 the company donated US$1.5 million to the "Brightness Trip" cataract-surgery mission in Malawi.
