= 2019 Spanish Indoor Athletics Championships =

Track and field competition

- Dates: 16–17 February
- Host city: Antequera
- Venue: Centro de Atletismo VI Centenario
- Events: 26

The 2019 Spanish Indoor Athletics Championships was the 55th edition of the annual indoor track and field competition organised by the Royal Spanish Athletics Federation (RFEA), which serves as the Spanish national indoor championship for the sport. A total of 26 events (divided evenly between the sexes) were contested over two days on 16 and 17 February at the Centro de Atletismo VI Centenario in Antequera, Málaga.

María Vicente set a Spanish indoor record of 4412 points for the women's pentathlon while Jesús Gómez won the men's 1500 metres in a championship record time of 3:41.37 minutes.

== Results ==
=== Men ===
Event	Gold		Silver		Bronze	
60 metres	Sergio López Barranco; At. Alcantarilla	6.69	Yunier Pérez; Playas de Castellón	6.71	Daniel Ambrós; Scorpio 71	6.73
200 metres	Daniel Rodríguez Serrano; Playas de Castellón	21.08	Mauro Triana; Playas de Castellón	21.30	Oriol Madi; C.A. Sant Celoni	21.39
400 metres	Óscar Husillos; C.A. Adidas	46.37	Lucas Búa; F.C. Barcelona	46.62	Bernat Erta; F.C. Barcelona	47.64
800 metres	Mariano García García; C.A. Fuente Álamo	1:50.43	Álvaro de Arriba; F.C. Barcelona	1:50.56	Pablo Sánchez-Valladares; F.C. Barcelona	1:50.88
1500 metres	Jesús Gómez Santiago; C.D. Nike Running	3:41.37 CR	Saúl Ordóñez; New Balance Team	3:42.29	Adrián Ben; F.C. Barcelona	3:42.49
3000 metres	Artur Bossy; F.C. Barcelona	7:59.19	Gonzalo García Garrido; Playas de Castellón	7:59.48	David Palacio; Fent Camí Mislata	8:00.13
60 m hurdles	Orlando Ortega; C.A. Adidas	7.58	Yidiel Contreras; Playas de Castellón	7.64	Enrique Llopis Doménech; C.A. Gandía	7.75
High jump	Marc Sánchez Alonso; C.A. Igualada	2.18 m	Miguel Ángel Sancho; Playas de Castellón	2.15 m	Simón Siverio; Tenerife Caja Canarias	2.15 m
Pole vault	Adrián Vallés; Grupompleo Pamplona	5.55 m	Didac Salas; F.C. Barcelona	5.45 m	Aleix Pi Portet; A.A. Catalunya	5.25 m
Long jump	Eusebio Cáceres; Independent	7.99 m	Héctor Santos Llorente; F.C. Barcelona	7.93 m	Jorge Ureña; Playas de Castellón	7.73 m
Triple jump	Pablo Torrijos; Playas de Castellón	16.61 m	Sergio Solanas; A.D. Marathon	16.40 m	Ramón Adalia; A.A. Catalunya	15.90 m
Shot put	Carlos Tobalina; F.C. Barcelona	20.39 m	Borja Vivas; At. Málaga	18.89 m	Alejandro Noguera; Playas de Castellón	18.87 m
Heptathlon	Jonay Jordán; Tenerife Caja Canarias	5705 pts	Jesús Castillo Patiño; Cornellá At.	5603 pts	Javier Pérez Rasines; Tenerife Caja Canarias	5406 pts

=== Women ===
Event	Gold		Silver		Bronze	
60 metres	Jaël Bestué; F.C. Barcelona	7.34	Estela García; C.D. Nike Running	7.34	Cristina Lara; F.C. Barcelona	7.36
200 metres	Patricia Urquía; Scorpio 71	24.19	Nerea Bermejo; Grupompleo Pamplona	24:28.	Alba Borrero; Unicaja Atletismo	24.30
400 metres	Laura Bueno; Valencia Esports	53.08	Aauri Bokesa; C.D. Nike Running	53.81	Salma Paralluelo; Scorpio 71	53.83
800 metres	Zoya Naumov; A.A. Catalunya	2:18.49	Adriana Cagigas; F.C. Barcelona	2:18.95	Natalia Romero; Unicaja Atletismo	2:18.99
1500 metres	Esther Guerrero; New Balance Team	4:25.71	Solange Pereira; Valencia Esports	4:28.41	Marta García Alonso; F.C. Barcelona	4:30.22
3000 metres	Cristina Espejo; Playas de Castellón	9:02.45	Celia Antón; C.A. Adidas	9:03.38	Maitane Melero; Grupompleo Pamplona	9:12.60
60 m hurdles	Caridad Jerez; F.C. Barcelona	8.32	Teresa Errandonea; Super Amara BAT	8.35	Patricia Ortega Trincado; At. San Sebastián	8.49
High jump	Cristina Ferrando; Playas de Castellón	1.82 m	Izaskun Turrillas Bueno; Grupompleo Pamplona	1.78 m	Raquel Álvarez Polo; Las Celtíberas	1.75 m
Pole vault	Maialen Axpe; At. San Sebastián	4.50 m	Malen Ruiz de Azúa; Super Amara BAT	4.38 m	Miren Bartolomé; Grupompleo Pamplona	4.22 m
Long jump	Leticia Gil Pérez; Scorpio 71	6.25 m	Cora Salas Planas; C.A. Igualada	6.23 m	Fátima Diame; Valencia Esports	6.21 m
Triple jump	Patricia Sarrapio; Playas de Castellón	13.92 m	Marina Lobato; Scorpio 71	13.64 m	Tessy Ebosele; C.A. La Blanca	13.36 m
Shot put	Úrsula Ruiz; Valencia Esports	17.14 m	Paula Ferrándiz; Playas de Castellón	14.76 m	Elena Gutiérrez; F.C. Barcelona	14.60 m
Pentathlon	María Vicente; C.D. Nike Running	4412 pts NR	Patricia Ortega Trincado; At. San Sebastián	4210 pts	Bárbara Hernando Fuster; Playas de Castellón	4209 pts
