= 1987 European Athletics Indoor Championships – Women's 3000 metres walk =

The women's 3000 metres walk event at the 1987 European Athletics Indoor Championships was held on 22 February. It was the first time that women's racewalking was contested at the European Indoor Championships.

== Results ==
Rank	Name	Nationality	Time	Notes
1st place, gold medalist(s)	Natalya Dmitrochenko	Soviet Union	12:57.59	CR
2nd place, silver medalist(s)	Giuliana Salce	Italy	12:59.11	
3rd place, bronze medalist(s)	Monica Gunnarsson	Sweden	13:06.46	
4	Dana Vavřačová	Czechoslovakia	13:07.47	
5	Emilia Cano	Spain	13:23.96	NR
6	Suzanne Griesbach	France	13:26.52	NR
7	Teresa Palacios	Spain	13:40.39	
8	Barbara Kollorz	East Germany	13:41.02	
9	Zofia Wolan	Poland	13:58.92	
10	Sabine Desmet	Belgium	14:01.11	
11	Maria Grazia Orsani	Italy	14:07.53	
12	Anna Bąk	Poland	14:18.02	
13	Nadia Forestan	Italy	14:21.73	
14	Anne-Catherine Berthonnaud	France	14:23.04	
	Kjersti Tysse	Norway	DQ	
