= Mégane Hoeltzel =

French footballer (born 2003)

Personal information
- Date of birth: 21 April 2003 (age 23)
- Place of birth: Wissembourg, France
- Height: 1.62 m (5 ft 4 in)
- Position: Midfielder

Team information
- Current team: Strasbourg
- Number: 20

Youth career
- 2009–2013: Rott
- 2013–2018: Saint-Étiernne Seltz

Senior career*
Years	Team	Apps	(Gls)
2018–2021	Vendenheim	39	(2)
2021–	Strasbourg	112	(7)

International career
2019	France U16	8	(0)
2019	France U17	5	(0)
2021–2022	France U19	5	(1)
2021–2022	France U20	9	(2)
- * Club domestic league appearances and goals as of 22 November 2026

Mégane Hoeltzel (born 21 April 2003) is a French professional footballer who plays as a midfielder for Première Ligue club Strasbourg.

== Club career ==
Hoeltzel joined Strasbourg in 2021.

== International career ==
Mégane Hoeltzel has represented France at youth levels.
