= Costa Rica National Stadium (2011) =

Stadium in San José, Costa Rica

Estadio Nacional
- La Joya de La Sabana "The Jewel of The Savanna"

- Interactive map of Estadio Nacional
- Location: San José
- Coordinates: 9°56′11″N 84°6′28″W
- Owner: Government of Costa Rica
- Capacity: 42,000
- Surface: Grass
- Scoreboard: Yes

Construction
- Groundbreaking: 2008
- Built: 2009–2011
- Opened: March 26, 2011
- Cost: US$110 million
- General contractor: Anhui Foreign Economic Construction Group

Tenant
- Costa Rica national football team (2011–present)

The Costa Rica National Stadium (Spanish: Estadio Nacional de Costa Rica) (officially INS Estadio for sponsorship reasons) is a multi-purpose stadium in La Sabana Metropolitan Park, San José, Costa Rica. It was the first modern sporting and events arena to be built in Central America. The stadium was completed in early 2011 and officially opened its doors to the public on March 26 of that year, with a capacity of 42.000 seats. The stadium replaced the original National Stadium (built 100 years ago), and is the home stadium of the Costa Rican national football team.

It has one high-definition, 160-square-metre (1,700 sq ft) video screen located in the southern section of the stadium, along with a smaller, monochromatic screen. A second monochromatic screen (of the same dimensions) is in the northern section.

The stadium hosted matches during the 2014 FIFA U-17 Women's World Cup, including the opening game, the third place match and the Final, as well as matches during the 2022 FIFA U-20 Women's World Cup, including the opening game and the Final.

The Estadio Nacional hosted the kickoff show of Coldplay's Music of the Spheres World Tour, due to the green credentials of the country.

== Funding and Construction ==
The initial cost was $88 million, it grew to $100 million.

In 2007, Costa Rican President Óscar Arias requested that during a state visit to China that China fund a stadium for Costa Rica. The Chinese government financed the construction, furnishing, and general costs of the stadium on their own. The old National Stadium was demolished on May 12, 2008, after UCR (Universidad de Costa Rica) vs. Brujas FC match and a 200M race where Nery Brenes set a new national record (20:28 seconds).

The president of Costa Rica, Óscar Arias and the leader of People's Republic of China Hu Jintao, agreed to build the stadium during Arias' first visit to China in October 2007. The construction began on March 12, 2009, and it finished in 2011.

The Chinese company Anhui Foreign Economic Construction was in charge of the construction of the stadium. About 800 Chinese workers immigrated.

== Inauguration ==
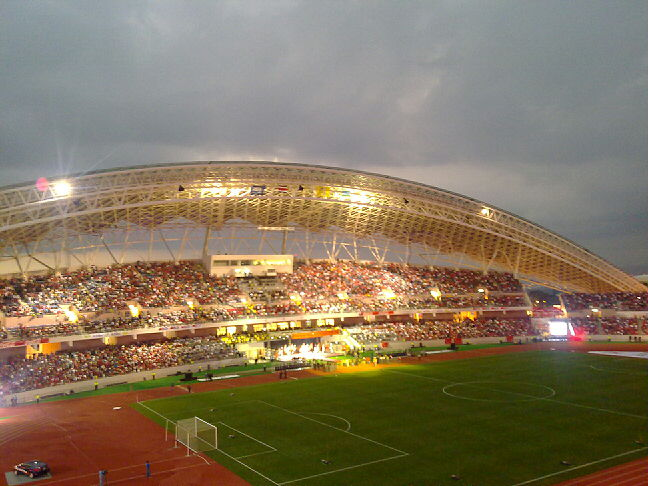
The stadium during the inauguration ceremony

The grand inauguration ceremony occurred on March 26, 2011. National and international sports activities and entertainment went on through April 10. An official stadium inauguration website was created, which informed the population of all inaugurating events.

The main inaugurating event was a friendly association football match between Costa Rica and China, which ended 2–2, with Álvaro Saborío scoring the first goal ever in the stadium.

During 2011, the new stadium was subject of a heavy investment made by the Costa Rican Football Federation to propel Costa Rican football into the world scene. To do this, the federation organized friendly matches against previous FIFA World Cup winners Argentina, Brazil, and Spain, with the latter being the then most recent winners of the tournament.

== Football tournaments ==
=== 2013 Copa Centroamericana ===
The Estadio Nacional hosted all 14 matches of the 2013 Copa Centroamericana.

Date	Team #1	Result	Team #2	Round	Attendance
18 January 2013	Guatemala	1–1	Nicaragua	Group A (opening match)	200
18 January 2013	Honduras	1–1	El Salvador	Group B	2,500
18 January 2013	Costa Rica	1–0	Belize	Group A	5,484
20 January 2013	Belize	0–0	Guatemala	Group A	250
20 January 2013	El Salvador	0–0	Panama	Group B	250
20 January 2013	Costa Rica	2–0	Nicaragua	Group A	5,980
22 January 2013	Nicaragua	1–2	Belize	Group A	750
22 January 2013	Panama	1–1	Honduras	Group B	3,450
22 January 2013	Costa Rica	1–1	Guatemala	Group A	6,760
25 January 2013	Guatemala	1–3	Panama	5th Place Match	279
25 January 2013	Honduras	1–0	Belize	Semifinals	1,664
25 January 2013	Costa Rica	1–0	El Salvador	Semifinals	4,993
27 January 2013	El Salvador	1–0	Belize	Third place match	1,997
27 January 2013	Costa Rica	1–0	Honduras	Final	14,146

=== 2014 FIFA U-17 Women's World Cup ===
El Nacional hosted nine games of the 2014 FIFA U-17 Women's World Cup. It hosted four Group A matches; including the opener, a Group C and Group D game, two quarterfinal matches, the 3rd place play-off and the final. The games were:

Date	Team #1	Result	Team #2	Round	Attendance
15 March 2014	Italy	2–0	Zambia	Group A (opening match)	34,453
15 March 2014	Costa Rica	0–3	Venezuela	Group A	34,453
18 March 2014	Venezuela	4–0	Zambia	Group A	25,624
18 March 2014	Costa Rica	0–1	Italy	Group A	25,624
23 March 2014	Japan	3–0	New Zealand	Group C	5,100
23 March 2014	Nigeria	3–0	Mexico	Group D	5,100
27 March 2014	Venezuela	3–2	Canada	Quarter-finals	1,812
27 March 2014	Ghana	2–2 (4–3 p)	Italy	Quarter-finals	1,812
4 April 2014	Venezuela	4–4 (2–0 p)	Italy	Third place match	29,814
4 April 2014	Japan	2–0	Spain	Final	29,814

=== 2022 FIFA U-20 Women's World Cup ===
Estadio Nacional hosted eighteen games of the 2022 FIFA U-20 Women's World Cup. It hosted four Group A matches, two Group B games, four Group C games, and two Group D games, two quarterfinal matches, two semifinal matches, the 3rd place play-off and the final. The games were:

Date	Team #1	Result	Team #2	Round	Attendance
10 August 2022	Spain	0–0	Brazil	Group A	9,819
10 August 2022	Costa Rica	1–3	Australia	Group A	22,506
11 August 2022	France	0–1	Nigeria	Group C	723
11 August 2022	Canada	0–2	South Korea	Group C	839
13 August 2022	Mexico	1–1	Colombia	Group B	9,336
13 August 2022	Costa Rica	0–5	Spain	Group A	22,446
14 August 2022	United States	0–3	Netherlands	Group D	2,652
14 August 2022	France	3–1	Canada	Group C	2,652
16 August 2022	Colombia	2–2	New Zealand	Group B	3,378
16 August 2022	Brazil	5–0	Costa Rica	Group A	11,923
17 August 2022	Netherlands	4–1	Ghana	Group D	814
17 August 2022	South Korea	0–1	France	Group C	979
20 August 2022	Spain	1–0	Mexico	Quarter-finals	4,914
20 August 2022	Colombia	0–1	Brazil	Quarter-finals	7,874
25 August 2022	Spain	2–1	Netherlands	Semi-finals	4,054
25 August 2022	Brazil	1–2	Japan	Semi-finals	6,571
28 August 2022	Netherlands	1–4	Brazil	Third place match	15,672
28 August 2022	Spain	3–1	Japan	Final	29,891

== Concerts ==
Date(s)	Artist	Opening act(s)	Performance	Attendance
10 April 2011	Shakira	—N/a	The Sun Comes Out World Tour	34,516 / 34,516
21 May 2011	Miley Cyrus	—N/a	Gypsy Heart Tour	33,451 / 33,451
12 September 2011	Red Hot Chili Peppers	Foals	I'm with You World Tour	20,716 / 23,300
27 September 2011	Judas Priest	Whitesnake	Epitaph World Tour	—N/a
20 November 2011	Pearl Jam	X	Pearl Jam Twenty Tour	—N/a
3 November 2012	Lady Gaga	The Darkness; Lady Starlight	Born This Way Ball	29,014 / 29,014
1 October 2013	Aerosmith	—N/a	Global Warming Tour	—N/a
22 October 2013	Black Sabbath	Megadeth	Black Sabbath Reunion Tour	—N/a
1 May 2014	Paul McCartney	—N/a	Out There	27,001 / 35,228
5 September 2015	Camila	—N/a	Elypse World Tour	—N/a
20 February 2016	Marc Anthony	Gente de Zona	Marc Anthony Live!	—N/a
19 May 2016	Alejandro Sanz	—N/a	Sirope Tour	—N/a
20 August 2016	Laura Pausini	—N/a	Simili Tour	—N/a
5 November 2016	Metallica	Heresy	WorldWired Tour	32,934 / 33,953
26 November 2016	Guns N' Roses	Gandhi	Not in This Lifetime... Tour	29,560 / 35,785
24 April 2017	Justin Bieber	Bartosz Brenes	Purpose World Tour	23,377 / 26,985
7 May 2017	Soy Luna	—N/a	Soy Luna en Concierto	—N/a
9 May 2017	Sting	—N/a	57th & 9th Tour	8,454 / 8,454
19 August 2017	Ricardo Montaner	—N/a	Normal Man Tour	—N/a
7 December 2017	Bruno Mars	DNCE	24K Magic World Tour	38,052 / 38,052
28 February 2018	Myriam Hernández	—N/a	Gala of Love	—N/a
7 March 2018	Joaquín Sabina	—N/a	Lo Niego Todo Tour	—N/a
8 August 2018	Laura Pausini	—N/a	Fatti Sentire World Tour	—N/a
18 August 2018	Marc Anthony	—N/a		—N/a
15 September 2018	Soy Luna	—N/a	Soy Luna en Vivo	—N/a
24 November 2018	Roger Waters	—N/a	Us + Them Tour	46,111 / 47,101
30 November 2018	Chayanne	—N/a	Desde el Alma Tour	25,000 / 30,000
21 March 2019	Luis Miguel	—N/a	México Por Siempre Tour	—N/a
17 August 2019	Ricardo Montaner	—N/a	—N/a	—N/a
30 November 2019	Morat	—N/a	Balas Perdidas Tour	—N/a
7 December 2019	Chayanne	—N/a	Desde el Alma Tour	38,000 / 40,000
20 February 2020	Pablo Alborán	—N/a	Tour Prometo	—N/a
23 February 2020	Caifanes	—N/a	—N/a	—N/a
18 March 2022	Coldplay	H.E.R. MishCatt	Music of the Spheres World Tour	86,199 / 86,199
19 March 2022	Coldplay	H.E.R. MishCatt	Music of the Spheres World Tour	86,199 / 86,199
25 June 2022	Paulina Rubio	—N/a	—N/a	—N/a
22 October 2022	Daddy Yankee	Tapón & Dani Maro; Choché Romano; Jair Cruz & El Tigre Tony	La Última Vuelta World Tour	68,025 / 70,587
23 October 2022	Daddy Yankee	Tapón & Dani Maro; Choché Romano; Jair Cruz & El Tigre Tony	La Última Vuelta World Tour	68,025 / 70,587
24 November 2022	Bad Bunny	In Betwin; Jurgen Dorsam; DJ Tocuma	World's Hottest Tour	52,851 / 52,851
25 November 2022	Eros Ramazotti	—N/a	Battito Infinito World Tour	TBA
25 February 2023	Joaquín Sabina	—N/a	Contra Todo Pronóstico Tour	TBA
5 March 2023	Caifanes	—N/a	2023 Tour	TBA
17 March 2023	Melendi	—N/a	Likes and Scars Tour	TBA
18 March 2023	Sin Bandera	—N/a	Frequency Tour	TBA
15 April 2023	Carlos Rivera	—N/a	A Tour to Everywhere	TBA
10 June 2023	Juan Luis Guerra	—N/a	Entre Mar y Palmeras Tour	TBA
29 July 2023	Grupo Firme	—N/a	You Have To Connect It Tour	TBA
13 August 2023	Lucero; Manuel Mijares	—N/a	Until We Were Made	TBA
9 September 2023	Rubén Blades	—N/a	Salswing Tour	TBA
31 October 2023	Red Hot Chili Peppers	IRONTOM; Saint Cecilia	Global Stadium Tour	51,838 / 51,838
2 December 2023	Roger Waters	—N/a	This Is Not a Drill	TBA
8 February 2024	Luis Miguel	—N/a	Luis Miguel Tour 2023–24	38,714 / 38,714
9 March 2024	Karol G	—N/a	Mañana Será Bonito Tour	104,761 / 104,761
10 March 2024	Karol G	—N/a	Mañana Será Bonito Tour	104,761 / 104,761
5 December 2025	Bad Bunny	—N/a	Debí Tirar Más Fotos World Tour	115,485 / 115,485
6 December 2025	Bad Bunny	—N/a	Debí Tirar Más Fotos World Tour	115,485 / 115,485
30 May 2026	Ed Sheeran		Loop Tour	/
08 October 2026	Iron Maiden	The Raven Age	Run for Your Lives World Tour	/
27 November 2026	Karol G	—N/a	Viajando Por El Mundo Tropitour	/
28 November 2026	Karol G	—N/a	Viajando Por El Mundo Tropitour	/

== Fire incident ==
During the opening ceremony of the 2013 Central American Games, a fire broke out in the stadium because of a stray firework which hit the western part of the stadium roof. The fire damaged some lighting equipments but the stadium was still used for the Games.

== Panorama view ==
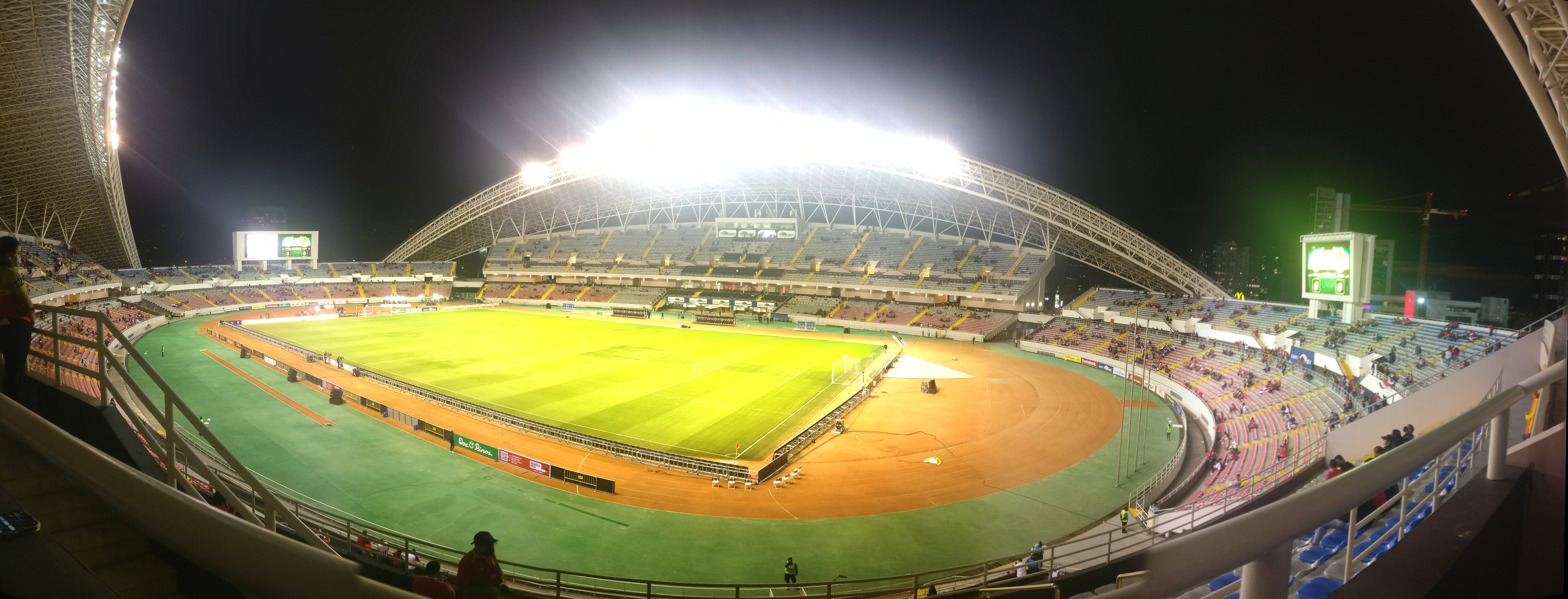
Panorama view of the Estadio Nacional de Costa Rica. March, 2022.

Preceded by Tofiq Bahramov Republican Stadium; Baku	FIFA U-17 Women's World Cup; Final Venue; 2014	Succeeded by Amman International Stadium; Amman
Preceded by Stade de la Rabine; Vannes	FIFA U-20 Women's World Cup; Final Venue; 2022	Succeeded by Estadio El Campín; Bogotá
