= Inma Gabarro =

Spanish footballer (born 2002)

Personal information
- Full name: María Inmaculada Gabarro Romero
- Date of birth: 5 November 2002 (age 24)
- Place of birth: Espartinas, Spain
- Height: 1.66 m (5 ft 5 in)
- Position: Midfielder

Team information
- Current team: Everton
- Number: 10

Youth career
- 2016–2019: Sevilla

Senior career*
Years	Team	Apps	(Gls)
2018–2021	Sevilla B		
2019–2024	Sevilla	120	(22)
2024–	Everton	8	(2)
2025–2026	→ Sevilla (loan)	14	(3)

International career^{‡}
2022	Spain U20	6	(8)
2021–2023	Spain U23	6	(5)
2022–	Spain	7	(2)
Medal record
Women's football
Representing Spain
FIFA U-20 Women's World Cup
Winner	2022 Costa Rica
- * Club domestic league appearances and goals as of 14:50, 19 May 2026 (UTC) ‡ National team caps and goals as of 15:18, 29 March 2026 (UTC)

María Inmaculada "Inma" Gabarro Romero (Spanish: [maˈɾi.a immakuˈlaða ˈimma ɣaˈβaro roˈmeɾo]; born 5 November 2002) is a Spanish professional footballer who plays as a midfielder for Women's Super League club Everton and the Spain national team.

== Club career ==
Gabarro started her career at Sevilla FC youth ranks. She debuted for the first team on 22 February 2020, coming on as a substitute in the 77th minute against RCD Espanyol and assisting Ana Franco to score the only goal in Sevilla's away victory. On 29 July 2024, Gabarro signed for English Women's Super League club Everton on a free transfer following the expiration of her contract at Sevilla. On 29 September 2024, Gabarro suffered an ACL injury against Manchester United and was subbed off in the 11th minute.

On 11 September 2025, Gabarro signed a one year contract extension, and was announced on a season long loan to Sevilla. On 28 January 2026, she was recalled from her loan spell early. She scored her first goal for Everton on 8 February 2026, the lone goal in a 1–0 win over London City Lionesses.

On 31 March 2026, Everton announced that Gabarro had suffered an ACL injury, the second in her career against Liverpool. This came half a year after she returned from her previous ACL injury.

== International career ==
Gabarro won the 2022 U-20 World Cup. She won the Silver Ball for the second best player in the tournament after Maika Hamano, and the Golden Boot as the top scorer of the tournament with 8 goals.

She made her senior debut on 11 November 2022, being a 72nd-minute substitution in a 7-0 friendly home win over Argentina, scoring the last goal.

== Career statistics ==
=== Club ===
As of match played 16 May 2026

Appearances and goals by club, season and competition
Club	Season	League			National cup (Note: Includes Copa de la Reina, Women's FA Cup)		League cup (Note: Includes Women's League Cup)		Total	
Club	Season	Division	Apps	Goals	Apps	Goals	Apps	Goals	Apps	Goals
Sevilla	2019–20	Primera División	1	0	1	0	—		1	0
Sevilla	2020–21	Primera División	32	4	1	0	—		33	4
Sevilla	2021–22	Primera División	30	5	2	0	—		32	5
Sevilla	2022–23	Liga F	28	7	0	0	—		28	7
Sevilla	2023–24	Liga F	29	6	1	0	—		30	6
Sevilla	Total		120	22	5	0	0	0	125	22
Everton	2023–24	Women's Super League	2	0	0	0	0	0	2	0
Everton	2024–25	Women's Super League	6	2	1	0	0	0	7	2
Everton	Total		8	2	1	0	0	0	9	2
Sevilla (loan)	2025–26	Liga F	14	3	1	1	—		15	4
Career total			142	27	7	0	0	0	149	28

=== International ===
As of match played 7 March 2026

Appearances and goals by national team and year
National team	Year	Apps	Goals
Spain	2022	1	1
Spain	2023	2	1
Spain	2024	1	0
Spain	2025	1	0
Spain	2026	2	0
Total		7	2

Scores and results list Spain's goal tally first, score column indicates score after each Gabarro goal.

List of international goals scored by Inma Gabarro
No.	Date	Venue	Opponent	Score	Result	Competition
1	11 November 2022	Estadio Municipal Álvarez Claro, Melilla, Spain	Argentina	7–0	7–0	Friendly
2	26 September 2023	Estadio Nuevo Arcángel, Córdoba, Spain	Switzerland	4–0	5–0	2023–24 UEFA Women's Nations League

== Honours ==
Spain U20

- FIFA U-20 Women's World Cup: 2022

Individual

- FIFA U-20 Women's World Cup Golden Boot: 2022
- FIFA U-20 Women's World Cup Silver Ball: 2022
