= Sonia García Majarín =

Spanish footballer (born 2002)

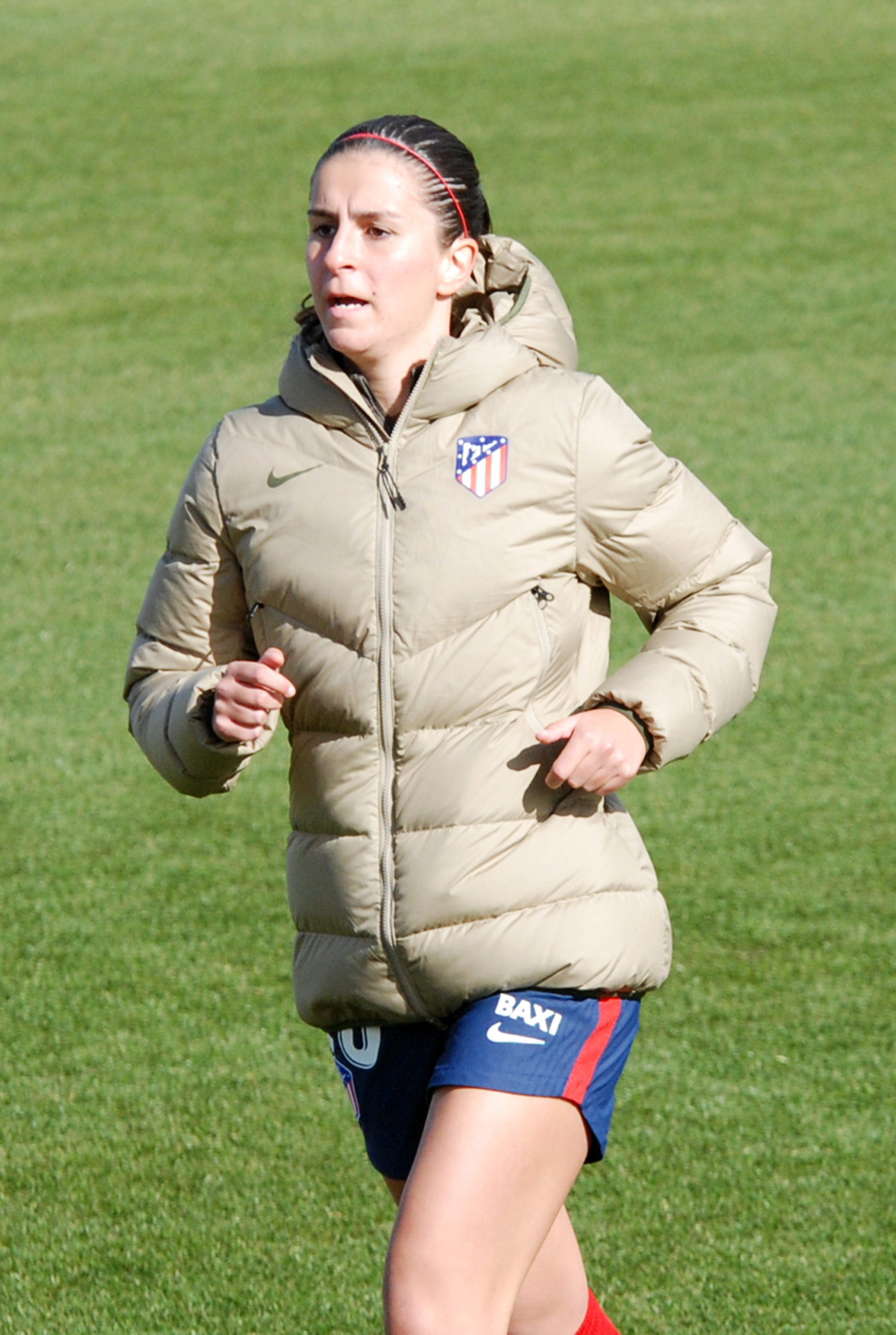

Personal information
- Date of birth: 6 December 2002 (age 23)
- Place of birth: Leganés, Spain
- Height: 1.70 m (5 ft 7 in)
- Position: Defender

Team information
- Current team: Levante Badalona
- Number: 4

Youth career
- 2016–2017: Atlético Madrid

Senior career*
Years	Team	Apps	(Gls)
2017–2018	Atlético Madrid C		
2018–	Atlético Madrid	6	(0)
2019–2021	→Atlético Madrid B	31	(1)
2021–2022	→ Alavés (loan)	26	(0)
2024–2025	→ Levante Badalona (loan)	15	(1)

International career
2019	Spain U17	1	(0)
2019	Spain U19	6	(0)
2022	Spain U20	3	(1)
Medal record
Women's football
Representing Spain
FIFA U-20 Women's World Cup
Winner	2022 Costa Rica
- * Club domestic league appearances and goals as of 28 May 2022

Sonia García Majarín (born 6 December 2002) is a Spanish professional footballer who plays as a defender for Levante Badalona, on loan from Atlético Madrid.

== Club career ==
García Majarín started her career at Atlético Madrid's youth academy. She is often known simply by her maternal surname, Majarín. On 10 March 2021, she made her first team debut in a Champions League game against Chelsea, coming on as a substitute for Kylie Strom. On 17 July, she renewed her contract with Atlético Madrid until 2024 before the club announced that she was going on loan to Alavés, who themselves were recently promoted to the Primera División.

== Honours ==
Spain U20

- FIFA U-20 Women's World Cup: 2022
