= Netherlands women's national under-23 volleyball team =

Dutch volleyball team

The Netherlands U23
- Association: Nederlandse Volleybal Bond
- Confederation: CEV

Uniforms
Home	Away

FIVB U23 World Championship
- Appearances: None
- www.volleybal.nl (in Dutch)

The Netherlands women's national under-23 volleyball team represents Netherlands in international women's volleyball competitions and friendly matches under the age 23 and it is ruled by the Dutch Volley Association That is an affiliate of International Volleyball Federation FIVB and also a part of European Volleyball Confederation CEV.

== Results ==
=== FIVB U23 World Championship ===
Champions Runners up Third place Fourth place

FIVB U23 World Championship
Year	Round	Position	Pld	W	L	SW	SL	Squad
(Mexico) 2013	Didn't Qualify							
(Turkey) 2015	Didn't Qualify							
(Slovenia) 2017	Didn't Qualify							
Total	0 Titles	0/3						

== Team ==
=== Current squad ===
The following is the Dutch roster under-20 team that also represent The Netherlands in Under-23 Events.

Head coach: (Netherlands) Julien Van De Vyver

#	Name	Year of birth	Height	Weight	Spike	Block
1	Haar Charlotte	1999	1.80 m (5 ft 11 in)	68 kg (150 lb)	000 cm (0 in)	000 cm (0 in)
2	Martherus Bo	1998	1.64 m (5 ft 5 in)	54 kg (119 lb)	000 cm (0 in)	000 cm (0 in)
3	Ressink Florien	1998	1.74 m (5 ft 9 in)	59 kg (130 lb)	000 cm (0 in)	000 cm (0 in)
4	Van Aalen Sarah	2000	1.77 m (5 ft 10 in)	63 kg (139 lb)	000 cm (0 in)	000 cm (0 in)
5	Wolt Christie	1998	1.80 m (5 ft 11 in)	64 kg (141 lb)	000 cm (0 in)	000 cm (0 in)
6	Wessels Kirsten	1998	1.85 m (6 ft 1 in)	70 kg (150 lb)	000 cm (0 in)	000 cm (0 in)
7	De Zwart Laura	1999	1.98 m (6 ft 6 in)	76 kg (168 lb)	000 cm (0 in)	000 cm (0 in)
8	Schreurs Britt	1998	1.83 m (6 ft 0 in)	73 kg (161 lb)	000 cm (0 in)	000 cm (0 in)
9	Daalderop Nika	1998	1.88 m (6 ft 2 in)	68 kg (150 lb)	000 cm (0 in)	000 cm (0 in)
10	Timmerman Eline	1998	1.92 m (6 ft 4 in)	78 kg (172 lb)	000 cm (0 in)	000 cm (0 in)
11	Koebrugge Carlijn Sanne	1998	1.89 m (6 ft 2 in)	72 kg (159 lb)	000 cm (0 in)	000 cm (0 in)
12	Scholten Iris	1999	1.91 m (6 ft 3 in)	68 kg (150 lb)	000 cm (0 in)	000 cm (0 in)
13	De Vries Tess	2001	1.85 m (6 ft 1 in)	67 kg (148 lb)	000 cm (0 in)	000 cm (0 in)
14	Boom Dagmar	2000	1.83 m (6 ft 0 in)	69 kg (152 lb)	000 cm (0 in)	000 cm (0 in)
15	Kos Susanne	2000	1.68 m (5 ft 6 in)	55 kg (121 lb)	000 cm (0 in)	000 cm (0 in)
16	Akse Jasmijn	1999	1.87 m (6 ft 2 in)	65 kg (143 lb)	000 cm (0 in)	000 cm (0 in)
17	Geerdink Eline	2000	1.93 m (6 ft 4 in)	68 kg (150 lb)	000 cm (0 in)	000 cm (0 in)
18	Mulder Vera	2000	1.87 m (6 ft 2 in)	68 kg (150 lb)	000 cm (0 in)	000 cm (0 in)
19	Vellener Charlot	2001	1.77 m (5 ft 10 in)	59 kg (130 lb)	000 cm (0 in)	000 cm (0 in)
