= 2017–18 Everton L.F.C. season =

Everton Ladies FC
2017-18 season
- Manager: Andy Spence
- Stadium: Select Security Stadium, Widnes
- FA WSL 1: 9th place
- WSL Cup: Quarter-finals
- FA Women's Cup: Semi-final
- Top goalscorer: League: 2 players tied (5); All: Chloe Kelly (10)
- Highest home attendance: 1,439 (Sep. 22 vs. Liverpool)
- Lowest home attendance: 122 (Dec. 10 vs. Sunderland)
- Average home league attendance: 376
Home colours	Away colours	Third colours

The 2017–18 season is Everton Ladies Football Club's first season returning to the FA Women's Super League since the 2014 season, having been promoted after winning the WSL2 Spring Series, and being one of the league's foundation clubs.

Following a reorganisation of top-level women's football in England, the 2017 season will only cover half of a traditional season's length, while the FA WSL shifts its calendar to match the traditional autumn-to-spring axis of football in Europe. For the same reason, there is no Champions League qualification nor relegation for which to be competed.

== First team ==
As of 12 February 2018.

Note: Flags indicate national team as defined under FIFA eligibility rules; some limited exceptions apply. Players may hold more than one non-FIFA nationality.

No.	Pos.	Nation	Player
1	GK	ENG	Kirstie Levell
3	DF	ENG	Danielle Turner
4	DF	ENG	Georgia Brougham
5	DF	NED	Siri Worm
6	DF	ENG	Gabrielle George
7	FW	ENG	Chantelle Boye-Hlorkah
8	MF	ENG	Jodie Brett
9	FW	ENG	Claudia Walker
10	FW	NIR	Simone Magill
11	FW	ENG	Chloe Kelly
12	MF	WAL	Angharad James

No.	Pos.	Nation	Player
13	GK	ENG	Lizzie Durack
14	MF	NED	Marthe Munsterman
15	MF	ENG	Emma Doyle
15	DF	ENG	Taylor Hinds
17	MF	NZL	Olivia Chance
18	FW	ENG	Courtney Sweetman-Kirk
20	MF	ENG	Megan Finnigan
21	FW	ENG	Mollie Green
26	DF	ENG	Faye Bryson
28	MF	WAL	Elise Hughes

== New contracts ==
Date	Pos	No.	Player	Contract end	Ref
29 June 2017	FW	9	(England) Claudia Walker	2019	
30 June 2017	FW	10	(England) Simone Magill	2019	

== Transfers ==
=== In ===
Entry date	Pos	No.	Player	From club	Contract end	Fee	Ref.
28 March 2017	FW	21	(England) Mollie Green	(England) Liverpool		N/A	
27 June 2017	DF	23	(England) Gabrielle George	First professional club	2019	N/A	
30 June 2017	DF	5	(Netherlands) Siri Worm	(Netherlands) Twente		N/A	
30 June 2017	MF	14	(Netherlands) Marthe Munsterman	(Netherlands) Twente		N/A	
30 June 2017	MF	12	(Wales) Angharad James	(England) Yeovil		Free	
10 July 2017	GK	13	(England) Lizzie Durack	(England) Notts County		N/A	
27 July 2017	MF	8	(England) Jodie Brett	(England) Chelsea		N/A	
31 July 2017	FW	11	(England) Chloe Kelly	(England) Arsenal	2018	Loan	
31 July 2017	FW	7	(England) Chantelle Boye-Hlorkah	First professional club	2018	N/A	
13 September 2017	FW	18	(England) Courtney Sweetman-Kirk	(England) Doncaster Rovers Belles	2019	Undisclosed	
25 January 2018	FW	11	(England) Chloe Kelly	(England) Arsenal	2020	Permanent transfer	
25 January 2018	DF	15	(England) Taylor Hinds	(England) Arsenal	2019	Permanent transfer	

=== Out ===
Exit date	Pos	No.	Player	To club	Fee	Ref.
15 June 2017	MF		(England) Lauren Davies	(England) Fylde	N/A	
15 June 2017	MF		(Wales) Emily Hollinshead	(England) Sheffield	N/A	
30 June 2017	FW		(England) Rosella Ayane	(England) Chelsea	End loan	
15 June 2017	FW		(England) Amber Stobbs	(England) West Ham United	N/A	
12 September 2017	DF	5	(England) Fern Whelan	(England) Brighton	N/A	
12 September 2017	FW	22	(England) Aileen Whelan	(England) Brighton	N/A	
21 September 2017	MF	8	(England) Michelle Hinnigan	Retired	N/A	
22 September 2017	DF		(England) Ellie Stewart	(England) Sunderland	N/A	
	MF	11	(England) Kelly Jones		N/A	
	DF		(England) Vicky Jones		N/A	

== Competitions ==
=== Women's Super League ===
==== League table ====
Pos	Team	Pld	W	D	L	GF	GA	GD	Pts	Qualification
6	Liverpool	18	9	1	8	30	27	+3	28	
7	Sunderland (R)	18	5	1	12	15	40	−25	16	Did not apply for a licence, Relegation to the FA Women's National League
8	Bristol City	18	5	1	12	13	47	−34	16	
9	Everton	18	4	2	12	19	30	−11	14	
10	Yeovil Town	18	0	2	16	2	54	−52	2	

Source: FA WSL
Rules for classification: 1) Points; 2) Goal difference; 3) Number of goals scored
(R) Relegated

==== Results summary ====
Overall								Home						Away					
Pld	W	D	L	GF	GA	GD	Pts	W	D	L	GF	GA	GD	W	D	L	GF	GA	GD
18	4	2	12	19	30	−11	14	3	0	6	13	16	−3	1	2	6	6	14	−8

Last updated: 26 May 2018.
Source: ELFC

==== Results by matchday ====
Matchday	1	2	3	4	5	6	7	8	9	10	11	12	13	14	15	16	17	18
Ground	H	A	H	A	A	H	A	A	H	A	H	A	H	H	H	H	H	A
Result	L	L	L	L	W	W	L	L	W	L	D	L	L	L	L	W	L	L
Position	8	8	9	9	9	6	8	9	8	8	8	8	8	8	8	8	8	9

Updated to match(es) played on 26 May 2018. Source: ELFC
A = Away; H = Home; W = Win; D = Draw; L = Loss

==== Matches ====
22 September 2017 1	Everton	0–2	Liverpool	Widnes
14:45 BST (UTC+01:00)	Finnigan (yellow card) 28'	Report; Box Score	Harding 70'; Weir (yellow card) 89'; Charles 90+3'	Stadium: Select Security Stadium; Attendance: 1,439; Referee: Sarah Garratt

1 October 2017 2	Birmingham City	2–1	Everton	Solihull
07:30 BST (UTC+01:00)	White 14'; Wellings 31'	Report; Box Score	Sweetman-Kirk (yellow card) 35'; Munsterman (yellow card) 45+2'; Kelly 46'; Brougham (yellow card) 88'	Stadium: Damson Park; Attendance: 821; Referee: Daniel Middleton

7 October 2017 3	Everton	2–3	Manchester City	Widnes
14:00 BST (UTC+01:00)	Walker 5'; Chance (yellow card) 60'; Magill 66'	Report; Box Score	Houghton 13'; Parris 13'; Bremer 19'	Stadium: Select Security Stadium; Attendance: 735; Referee: Daniel Middleton

29 October 2017 4	Everton	0–2	Arsenal	Widnes
10:00 BST (UTC+01:00)		Report; Box Score	Miedema 23'; Mead 78'	Stadium: Select Security Stadium; Attendance: 435; Referee: Lindsey Robinson

11 November 2017 5	Yeovil	0–2	Everton	Yeovil
10:00 BST (UTC+01:00)	Curson (yellow card) 52'	Report; Box Score	Sweetman-Kirk 17'; Kelly 60' (pen.)	Stadium: Huish Park Stadium; Attendance: 683; Referee: Marc Whaley

10 December 2017 6	Everton	5–1	Sunderland	Widnes
09:00 BST (UTC+01:00)	Boye-Hlorkah 36', 40'; Sweetman-Kirk 51'; Turner 56', 89'	Report; Box Score	Galloway 90+2'	Stadium: Select Security Stadium; Attendance: 122; Referee: Dean Watson

6 January 2018 7	Bristol City	2–1	Everton	South Gloucestershire and Stroud College
17:30 BST (UTC+01:00)	Hemp 10', 66' (pen.)	Report; Box Score	Brougham 75'; Kelly (yellow card) 84'	Stadium: Stoke Gifford Stadium; Attendance: 710; Referee: James Durkin

28 January 2018 8	Chelsea	1–0	Everton	Kingston upon Thames
12:30 BST (UTC+01:00)	Asante (yellow card) 23'; Andersson 84'	Report; Box Score		Stadium: Kingsmeadow; Attendance: 1,731; Referee: Rob Whitton

11 February 2018 9	Everton	2–1	Reading	Widnes
14:00 BST (UTC+01:00)	Sweetman-Kirk 5'; Kelly 22'; Green (yellow card) 90+1'	Report; Box Score	Furness 37' (yellow card) 76'; Pearce (yellow card) 45+2'; Williams (yellow card) 66'	Stadium: Select Security Stadium; Attendance: 274; Referee: Lindsey Robinson

23 February 2018 10	Arsenal	1–0	Everton	Borehamwood
19:30 BST (UTC+01:00)	Mead 38' van de Donk (yellow card) 88' van Veenendaal (yellow card) 90'	Report; Box Score	Kelly (yellow card) 74'; Bryson (yellow card) 90+5'	Stadium: Meadow Park; Referee: Alan Dale

28 March 2018 11	Sunderland	1–1	Everton	South Shields
19:00 BST (UTC+01:00)	Staniforth 62'	Report	Turner 47'	Stadium: Mariners Park; Attendance: 224; Referee: Rebecca Welch

18 April 2018 12	Everton	0–1	Chelsea	Widnes
19:00 BST (UTC+01:00)		Report	Eriksson 12'	Stadium: Select Security Stadium; Referee: Sam Mulhall

22 April 2018 13	Reading	3–0	Everton	High Wycombe
12:30 BST (UTC+01:00)	Moore (yellow card) 27'; Allen 47'; Bruton 73'; Kirsty Pearce 85'	Report	Turner (yellow card) 31'; James (yellow card) 45+2'; Munsterman (yellow card) 80'	Stadium: Adams Park; Attendance: 263; Referee: Rebecca Welch

27 April 2018 14	Liverpool	1–1	Everton	Birkenhead
14:00 BST (UTC+01:00)	Coombs 46'; Bonner (yellow card) 67'	Report; Box Score	Brett 65'; Munsterman (yellow card) 75'	Stadium: Prenton Park; Attendance: 1,416; Referee: Martin Woods

6 May 2018 15	Everton	1–2	Bristol City	Widnes
12:30 BST (UTC+01:00)	Turner 7'	Report; Box Score	Hemp 18'; Biesmans 90+2'	Stadium: Select Security Stadium; Attendance: 143; Referee: Willie Kirk

25 March 2018 16	Everton	3–1	Yeovil Town	Widnes
14:00 BST (UTC+01:00)	Turner 35'; Green 62', 73' (pen.)	Box Score	Piggott 48'	Stadium: Select Security Stadium; Attendance: 130; Referee: Thomas Parsons

13 May 2018 17	Everton	0–3	Birmingham City	Widnes
14:00 BST (UTC+01:00)		Report; Box Score	Wellings 20', 58'; White 86'	Stadium: Select Security Stadium; Attendance: 337; Referee: Amy Fearn

20 May 2018 18	Manchester City	3–0	Everton	Manchester
12:00 BST (UTC+01:00)	Scott 21', 60'; Parris 57'	Report; Box Score		Stadium: Academy Stadium; Attendance: 1,605; Referee: Leigh Doughty

=== FA Cup ===
4 February 2018 Fourth round	Everton	3–1	Bristol City	Crosby
14:00 GMT (UTC+00:00)	Chance 52', 83'; Brougham 56'	Report	Arthur 7'	Stadium: Marine Travel Arena; Attendance: 712

18 February 2018 Fifth round	Lewes	0–6	Everton	Lewes
14:00 GMT (UTC+00:00)		Report	Boye-Hlorkah 8', 19', 40'; Kelly 12'; Turner 69'; Finnigan 89'	Stadium: The Dripping Pan; Attendance: 975

25 March 2018 Quarter-final	Durham	1–6	Everton	Durham
12:30 GMT (UTC+00:00)	Johnson (yellow card) 18'; Robson 65'	Report	Sweetman-Kirk 15', 55', 63'; Chance 42'; Turner 58'; Brett 90'	Stadium: New Ferens Park

15 April 2018 Semi-final	Everton	1-2	Arsenal	Crosby
12:30 GMT (UTC+00:00)	Kelly 67' (pen.)	Report	Carter 25'; Quinn 90'	Stadium: Rossett Park

=== WSL Cup ===
==== Group stage ====
Pos	Team	Pld	W	WPEN	LPEN	L	GF	GA	GD	Pts	Qualification	MCI	EVE	BIR	DON	OXF
1	Manchester City	4	4	0	0	0	13	3	+10	12	Advance to knock-out stage	—	2–1	2–0	—	—
2	Everton	4	3	0	0	1	9	2	+7	9	Advance to knock-out stage	—	—	1–0	—	4–0
3	Birmingham City	4	2	0	0	2	7	5	+2	6		—	—	—	3–2	4–0
4	Doncaster Rovers Belles	4	1	0	0	3	9	10	−1	3		2–3	0–3	—	—	—
5	Oxford United	4	0	0	0	4	1	19	−18	0		0–6	—	—	1–5	—

Source: FA WSL
Rules for classification: 1) Points; 2) Goal difference; 3) Number of goals scored

12 October 2017 1	Doncaster Rovers Belles	0–3	Everton	Doncaster
14:30 GMT (UTC+00:00)		Report; Box Score	Kelly 6'; Little 23' (o.g.); Munsterman 86'	Stadium: The Keepmoat Stadium; Attendance: 482; Referee: Luke Watson

2 November 2017 2	Everton	1–0	Birmingham City	Widnes
15:00 GMT (UTC+00:00)	Sweetman-Kirk 12'; Turner (yellow card) 43'	Report; Box Score	Mannion (yellow card) 69'	Stadium: Select Security Stadium; Attendance: 181; Referee: Andy Spence

5 November 2017 3	Manchester City	2–1	Everton	Manchester
14:00 GMT (UTC+00:00)	Christiansen 25'; Parris 80'	Report; Box Score	Magill 77'	Stadium: Academy Stadium; Attendance: 873; Referee: Sam Barrott

16 November 2017 4	Everton	4–0	Oxford United	Widnes
14:45 GMT (UTC+00:00)	Kelly 10', 81', 83'; Walker 69'	Report; Box Score		Stadium: Select Security Stadium; Attendance: 188; Referee: Aaron Jackson

==== Knock-out Rounds ====
16 December 2017 Quarter-final	Everton	1–1 (a.e.t.) (3–4 p)	Reading	Widnes
18:00 GMT (UTC+00:00)	Kelly (yellow card) 97' (goal) 112'	Report; Box Score	Burton (yellow card) 26'; Williams (yellow card) 56'; Linnett 94'	Stadium: Select Security Stadium; Attendance: 155; Referee: Benjamin Speedie

== Statistics ==
As of 26 May 2018

Players without any appearance are not included.

No.	Pos	Nat	Player	Total		FA WSL		WSL Cup		FA Cup	
No.	Pos	Nat	Player	Apps	Goals	Apps	Goals	Apps	Goals	Apps	Goals
Goalkeepers:
1	GK	(England) ENG	Kirstie Levell	16	0	7	0	5	0	4	0
13	GK	(England) ENG	Lizzie Durack	11	0	11	0	0	0	0	0
Defenders:
3	DF	(England) ENG	Danielle Turner	26	7	17	5	5	0	4	2
4	DF	(England) ENG	Georgia Brougham	21	2	12	1	5	0	4	1
5	DF	(Netherlands) NED	Siri Worm	23	0	11+3	0	3+2	0	4	0
15	DF	(England) ENG	Taylor Hinds	7	0	4+2	0	0	0	0+1	0
23	DF	(England) ENG	Gabrielle George	25	0	18	0	5	0	2	0
26	DF	(England) ENG	Faye Bryson	18	0	10+1	0	1+2	0	3+1	0
Midfielders:
8	MF	(England) ENG	Jodie Brett	21	2	11+4	1	1+2	0	3	1
12	MF	(Wales) WAL	Angharad James	23	0	13+3	0	4	0	3	0
14	MF	(Netherlands) NED	Marthe Munsterman	15	1	6+6	0	1	1	1+1	0
17	MF	(New Zealand) NZL	Olivia Chance	19	3	6+5	0	1+3	0	4	3
20	MF	(England) ENG	Megan Finnigan	24	1	16	0	4	0	3+1	1
28	MF	(Wales) WAL	Elise Hughes	6	0	0+6	0	0	0	0	0
Forwards:
7	FW	(England) ENG	Chantelle Boye-Hlorkah	17	5	9+1	2	4	0	1+2	3
9	FW	(England) ENG	Claudia Walker	9	2	4+1	1	3+1	1	0	0
10	FW	(Northern Ireland) NIR	Simone Magill	11	2	4+2	1	5	1	0	0
11	FW	(England) ENG	Chloe Kelly	24	10	13+2	3	4+1	5	4	2
18	FW	(England) ENG	Courtney Sweetman-Kirk	27	9	17+1	5	5	1	3+1	3
21	FW	(England) ENG	Mollie Green	17	2	9+4	2	0+1	0	1+2	0

== Honours ==
- FA WSL Player of the Month - November: FW Courtney Sweetman-Kirk
