= 2017 Everton L.F.C. season =

Everton Ladies FC
2017 season
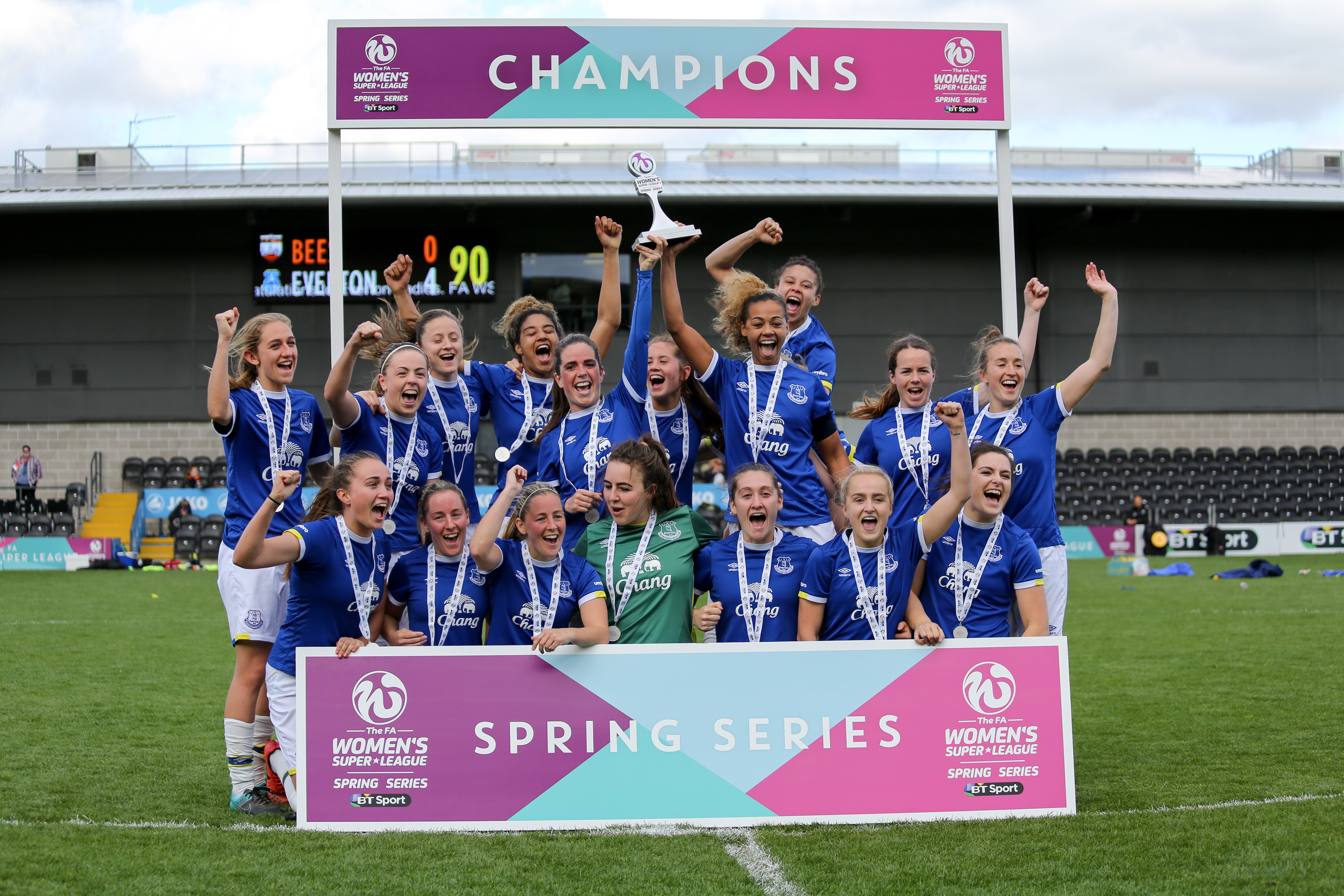
- Everton crowned FA WSL Spring Series Champions
- Manager: Andy Spence
- Stadium: Select Security Stadium, Widnes
- FA WSL 2: Champions, 1st
- WSL Cup: First Round
- FA Women's Cup: Fifth Round
- Top goalscorer: Claudia Walker (7)
- Highest home attendance: 821 (May 14 vs. Watford)
- Lowest home attendance: 165 (Apr 30 vs. Brighton)
- Average home league attendance: 419
Home colours	Away colours	Third colours

The FA WSL Spring Series (2017 season) was Everton Ladies Football Club's third season competing in the Women's Super League 2.

Due to the reorganisation of top-level women's football in England, the 2017 season only covered half of a traditional season's length, while the FA WSL shifted its calendar to match the traditional autumn-to-spring axis of football in Europe. For the same reason, there is no Champions League qualification nor relegation for which to be competed.

== First Team ==
As of 28 January 2018.

Note: Flags indicate national team as defined under FIFA eligibility rules; some limited exceptions apply. Players may hold more than one non-FIFA nationality.

No.	Pos.	Nation	Player
1	GK	ENG	Kirstie Levell
3	DF	ENG	Danielle Turner
5	DF	ENG	Fern Whelan
7	FW	ENG	Chantelle Boye-Hlorkah
8	MF	ENG	Michelle Hinnigan
10	FW	NIR	Simone Magill
11	MF	ENG	Kelly Jones
12	DF	ENG	Georgia Brougham
15	MF	ENG	Emma Doyle
17	MF	NZL	Olivia Chance
18	FW	ENG	Claudia Walker

No.	Pos.	Nation	Player
20	MF	ENG	Megan Finnigan
21	FW	ENG	Mollie Green
26	DF	ENG	Faye Bryson
—	GK	ENG	Jennifer Myler
—	MF	WAL	Emily Hollinshead
—	DF	ENG	Erin Staunton-Turner
—	MF	ENG	Lauren Davies
—	DF	ENG	Grace Nelson
—	DF	ENG	Vicky Jones
—	FW	ENG	Amber Stobbs

== Transfers ==
=== In ===
Entry date	Pos	No.	Player	From club	Contract end	Fee	Ref.
3 February 2017	FW	22	(England) Amber Stobbs	(England) Reading		N/A	
3 February 2017	MF	17	(New Zealand) Olivia Chance	(Iceland) Breiðablik		N/A	
28 March 2017	FW	21	(England) Mollie Green	(England) Liverpool		N/A	
5 May 2017	FW	22	(England) Aileen Whelan	(England) Notts County		N/A	
5 May 2017	DF	5	(England) Fern Whelan	(England) Notts County		N/A	

== Competitions ==
=== Women's Super League 2 ===
==== Results summary ====
Overall								Home						Away					
Pld	W	D	L	GF	GA	GD	Pts	W	D	L	GF	GA	GD	W	D	L	GF	GA	GD
9	7	1	1	25	7	+18	22	4	0	0	13	0	+13	3	1	1	12	7	+5

Last updated: 28 January 2018.
Source: ELFC

==== Results by matchday ====
Matchday	1	2	3	4	5	6	7	8	9
Ground	A	A	A	H	A	H	H	H	A
Result	W	W	L	W	T	W	W	W	W
Position	2	2	4	2	2	1	1	1	1

Source: ELFC
A = Away; H = Home; W = Win; L = Loss; T = Tie

==== Matches ====
12 February 2017 1	Oxford United	1–2	Everton	Abingdon
14:00 BST (UTC+01:00)	Umotong (yellow card) 88'	Report	Magill 13'; Jones 48'; Bryson (yellow card) 80'	Stadium: Northcourt Road; Attendance: 243; Referee: Kevin Howick

12 March 2017 2	Sheffield	1–2	Everton	Dronfield
14:00 BST (UTC+01:00)	Gilliatt (yellow card) 75'; McCue 78'	Report	Walker 67'; Gilliatt 80' (o.g.)	Stadium: Coach and Horses; Attendance: 385; Referee: Lee Hibble

2 April 2017 3	Millwall Lionesses	2–1	Everton	Bermondsey
14:00 BST (UTC+01:00)	Rutherford 21'; Devlin 64'	Report	Walker 27' (pen.)	Stadium: St. Paul's Sport Ground; Attendance: 156; Referee: Dean Skipper

16 April 2017 4	Everton	3–0	Aston Villa	Widnes
14:00 BST (UTC+01:00)	Magill 38'; Walker 68'; Bryson 76'	Report		Stadium: Select Security Stadium; Attendance: 344; Referee: Steven Copeland

23 April 2017 5	Doncaster Rovers Belles	3–3	Everton	Doncaster
14:00 BST (UTC+01:00)	Sweetman-Kirk 37', 47' (pen.); Barker (yellow card) 70'; Little 74'	Report	Brougham 3'; Walker 20'; Green (yellow card) 70'; Chance 85'	Stadium: Keepmoat Stadium; Attendance: 482; Referee: Gareth Rhodes

30 April 2017 6	Everton	5–0	Brighton & Hove Albion	Widnes
14:00 BST (UTC+01:00)	Magill 11' (pen.); Turner 16', 48'; Walker 18'; Brougham 83'	Report		Stadium: Select Security Stadium; Attendance: 165; Referee: Daniel Issawi

6 May 2017 7	Everton	1–0	Durham	Widnes
14:00 BST (UTC+01:00)	George 13'	Report		Stadium: Select Security Stadium; Attendance: 344; Referee: Kristian Silcock

14 May 2017 8	Everton	4–0	Watford	Widnes
14:00 BST (UTC+01:00)	Brougham 18'; Whelan 48'; Magill (yellow card) 69' Chance 81'; Green 90'	Report		Stadium: Select Security Stadium; Attendance: 821; Referee: Elizabeth Sims

20 May 2017 9	London Bees	0–4	Everton	Canons Park
14:45 BST (UTC+01:00)	Anderson (yellow card) 86'	Report	Green 28'; Hinnigan 34'; Walker 70' (pen.), 80'; Jones (yellow card) 88'	Stadium: The Hive Stadium; Attendance: 1,070; Referee: Andreas Anastasiou

=== FA Cup ===
5 February 2017 Third round	Brighouse Town	1–8	Everton	Halifax, West Yorkshire
14:00 GMT (UTC+00:00)	Cass	Report; Box Score	Walker; Chance; Magill; Hinnigan	Stadium: Dual Seal Stadium

19 February 2017 Fourth round	Durham	2–2 (a.e.t.) (3–4 p)	Everton	Durham
14:00 GMT (UTC+00:00)	Hepple; Salicki	Report; Box Score	Hinnigan; Finnigan	Stadium: New Ferens Park

19 March 2017 Fifth round	Liverpool	2–1 (a.e.t.)	Everton	Widnes
14:00 GMT (UTC+00:00)	Harding 8' van de Sanden 108'	Box Score	Magill 69'	Stadium: Select Security Stadium; Attendance: 728

== Statistics ==
As of 10 February 2018

Players without any appearance are not included.

No.	Pos	Nat	Player	Total		FA WSL		FA Cup	
No.	Pos	Nat	Player	Apps	Goals	Apps	Goals	Apps	Goals
Goalkeepers:
1	GK	(England) ENG	Kirstie Levell	12	0	9	0	3	0
	GK	(England) ENG	Jennifer Myler	1	0	0+1	0	0	0
Defenders:
3	DF	(England) ENG	Danielle Turner	9	2	9	2	0	0
5	DF	(England) ENG	Fern Whelan	1	0	1	0	0	0
12	DF	(England) ENG	Georgia Brougham	9	2	8	2	1	0
23	DF	(England) ENG	Gabrielle George	9	1	9	1	0	0
26	DF	(England) ENG	Faye Bryson	8	1	4+4	1	0	0
	DF	(England) ENG	Vicky Jones	9	0	5+4	0	0	0
	DF	(England) ENG	Erin Staunton-Turner	0	0	0	0	0	0
	DF	(England) ENG	Grace Nelson	0	0	0	0	0	0
Midfielders:
8	MF	(England) ENG	Michelle Hinnigan	11	3	8+1	1	2	2
11	MF	(England) ENG	Kelly Jones	10	1	9	1	1	0
15	MF	(England) ENG	Emma Doyle	0	0	0	0	0	0
17	MF	(New Zealand) NZL	Olivia Chance	10	4	3+6	2	0+1	2
20	MF	(England) ENG	Megan Finnigan	9	1	8	0	1	1
	MF	(Wales) WAL	Emily Hollinshead	7	0	3+3	0	1	0
	MF	(England) ENG	Lauren Davies	3	0	3	0	0	0
Forwards:
7	FW	(England) ENG	Chantelle Boye-Hlorkah	1	0	1	0	0	0
10	FW	(Northern Ireland) NIR	Simone Magill	9	8	7	5	2	3
18	FW	(England) ENG	Claudia Walker	10	10	8+1	7	1	3
21	FW	(England) ENG	Mollie Green	7	1	7	1	0	0
22	FW	(England) ENG	Aileen Whelan	3	0	1+2	0	0	0
	FW	(England) ENG	Amber Stobbs	5	0	1+3	0	0+1	0

== Honours ==
- FA WSL Players' Player of the Spring Series: Michelle Hinnigan
- FA WSL Head Coach of the Spring Series: Andy Spence
