= 2018–19 Everton L.F.C. season =

Everton Ladies FC
2018–19 season
- Manager: Andy Spence (until 7 November 2018); Jennifer Herst (interim) (interim from 7 November 2018 until 1 December 2018); Willie Kirk (from 1 December 2018)
- Stadium: Merseyrail Community Stadium, Southport
- FA Women's Super League: 10th place
- WSL Cup: Group Stage (3rd)
- FA Women's Cup: Fourth Round
- Top goalscorer: League: Inessa Kaagman (4); All: Inessa Kaagman (5)
- Highest home attendance: 370 (Nov. 18 vs. Arsenal)
- Lowest home attendance: 103 (Apr. 17 vs. Birmingham)
- Average home league attendance: 192
Home colours	Away colours

The 2018–19 season is Everton Ladies Football Club's second season competing in the FA Women's Super League since being promoted after winning the 2017 WSL2 Spring Series, and being one of the league's foundation clubs.

Ahead of the 2018–19 season, Everton announced that they would play the first half of the season at Merseyrail Community Stadium.

== Review ==
After going winless in the league for the first six matches reaching bottom of the table, Everton sacked longtime manager Andy Spence and appointed goalkeeper coach, Jennifer Herst, as interim manager. On 1 December Willie Kirk was announced as manager for the Ladies first team.

== First team ==
As of 7 February 2019

Note: Flags indicate national team as defined under FIFA eligibility rules; some limited exceptions apply. Players may hold more than one non-FIFA nationality.

No.	Pos.	Nation	Player
1	GK	ENG	Kirstie Levell
2	DF	ENG	Faye Bryson
3	DF	ENG	Danielle Turner
4	DF	ENG	Georgia Brougham
5	DF	NED	Siri Worm
6	DF	ENG	Gabrielle George
7	FW	ENG	Chantelle Boye-Hlorkah
8	MF	NED	Inessa Kaagman
9	FW	ENG	Claudia Walker
10	FW	NIR	Simone Magill
11	FW	ENG	Chloe Kelly

No.	Pos.	Nation	Player
12	MF	WAL	Angharad James
13	MF	ENG	Abbey-Leigh Stringer
14	DF	ENG	Taylor Hinds
16	FW	ENG	Hannah Cain
17	MF	NZL	Olivia Chance
20	MF	ENG	Megan Finnigan
22	MF	NED	Dominique Bruinenberg
24	DF	SCO	Emma Brownlie
25	GK	SCO	Becky Flaherty
28	MF	WAL	Elise Hughes

== Coaching staff ==
Position	Name
Head Coach	(Scotland) Willie Kirk
Assistant Coach	(Scotland) Chris Roberts
Goalkeeping Coach	(England) Jennifer Herst

== Transfers ==
=== In ===
Entry date	Pos	No.	Player	From club	Contract end	Fee	Ref.
22 May 2018	MF	8	(Netherlands) Inessa Kaagman	(Netherlands) AFC jax		N/A	
3 July 2018	MF	22	(Netherlands) Dominique Bruinenberg	(Netherlands) Sunderland		N/A	
25 July 2018	FW	16	(England) Hannah Cain	(England) Sheffield		N/A	
2 August 2018	MF	13	(England) Abbey-Leigh Stringer	(England) Birmingham City		N/A	
2 August 2018	GK	25	(Scotland) Becky Flaherty	(England) Liverpool		N/A	
24 January 2019	DF	24	(Scotland) Emma Brownlie	(Scotland) Hibernian L.F.C.		N/A	

=== Out ===
Exit date	Pos	No.	Player	To club	Fee	Ref.
22 June 2018	MF	14	(Netherlands) Marthe Munsterman	(Netherlands) AFC Ajax	N/A	
8 June 2018	GK	13	(England) Lizzie Durack	(England) Chelsea	N/A	
13 July 2018	MF	21	(England) Mollie Green	(England) Manchester United	N/A	
14 July 2018	FW	18	(England) Courtney Sweetman-Kirk	(England) Liverpool L.F.C.	N/A	
26 July 2018	MF	8	(England) Jodie Brett	(England) Brighton & Hove Albion	Undisclosed fee	

=== Loan Out ===
Exit date	Pos	No.	Player	To club	Fee	Ref.
24 January 2019	FW	9	(England) Claudia Walker	(England) Birmingham City	N/A	

== Competitions ==
=== Preseason friendlies ===
14 July 2018 Preseason	Everton	v	Aston Villa
Note: Closed door scrimmage

22 July 2018 Preseason	Everton	0–0	Liverpool	Crosby
14:00 BST (UTC+01:00)		Report		Stadium: Marine Travel Arena

29 July 2018 Preseason	Everton	v	Arsenal
Note: Closed door scrimmage

6 August 2018 Friendship Tournament	Everton (England)	6–0	(United States) LA Salsa SC	Gibraltar
20:00 BST (UTC+01:00)	Walker 11'; Kaagman 13', 40'; Brougham 59', 81'; Cain 89'			Stadium: Victoria Stadium

8 August 2018 Friendship Tournament	Atlético Madrid (Spain)	1–0	(England) Everton	Gibraltar
20:00 BST (UTC+01:00)	González 77'			Stadium: Victoria Stadium

10 August 2018 Friendship Tournament Semi-Final	Real Betis (Spain)	1–0	(England) Everton	Gibraltar
17:00 BST (UTC+01:00)	García 39'	Report		Stadium: Victoria Stadium

=== Women's Super League ===
==== League table ====
Pos	Team	Pld	W	D	L	GF	GA	GD	Pts	Qualification
7	West Ham United	20	7	2	11	25	37	−12	23	
8	Liverpool	20	7	1	12	21	38	−17	22	
9	Brighton & Hove Albion	20	4	4	12	16	38	−22	16	
10	Everton	20	3	3	14	15	38	−23	12	
11	Yeovil Town (R)	20	2	1	17	11	60	−49	−3 (Note: Yeovil Town deducted 10 points for entering administration.)	Relegation to the Championship

Source: FA WSL
Rules for classification: 1) Points; 2) Goal difference; 3) Number of goals scored
(R) Relegated

==== Results summary ====
Overall								Home						Away					
Pld	W	D	L	GF	GA	GD	Pts	W	D	L	GF	GA	GD	W	D	L	GF	GA	GD
20	3	3	14	15	38	−23	12	2	2	6	10	22	−12	1	1	8	5	16	−11

Last updated: 15 May 2019.
Source: ELFC

==== Results by matchday ====
Matchday	1	2	3	4	5	6	7	8	9	10	11	12	13	14	15	16	17	18	19	20
Ground	A	H	H	A	H	H	A	H	A	H	H	A	A	H	A	A	H	A	H	A
Result	L	L	D	D	L	L	L	L	W	L	L	D	L	W	L	L	L	L	W	L
Position	9	9	9	9	10	11	11	11	9	9	10	10	10	10	10	10	10	10	10	10

Updated to match(es) played on 15 May 2019. Source: ELFC
A = Away; H = Home; W = Win; D = Draw; L = Loss

==== Matches ====
9 September 2018 1	Birmingham City	1–0	Everton	Solihull
12:00 BST (UTC+01:00)	Wellings 1'	Report; Box Score		Stadium: Damson Park; Attendance: 603; Referee: James Bell

20 September 2018 2	Everton	0–4	Manchester City	Southport
19:00 BST (UTC+01:00)		Report; Box Score	Stanway 14'; Parris 65', 68'; Emslie 90+2'	Stadium: Merseyrail Community Stadium; Attendance: 296; Referee: Lucy Oliver

23 September 2018 3	Everton	0–0	Chelsea	Southport
14:00 BST (UTC+01:00)		Report; Box Score	Ericsson (yellow card) 64'; Mjelde (yellow card) 74'	Stadium: Merseyrail Community Stadium; Attendance: 213; Referee: Helen Conley

14 October 2018 4	Everton	3–3	Brighton & Hove Albion	Southport
14:00 BST (UTC+01:00)	Kaagman 27'; George 45+1'; Kelly 70'	Report; Box Score	Buet 2'; Brazil 75', 78'	Stadium: Merseyrail Community Stadium; Attendance: 177; Referee: Steven Copeland

28 October 2018 5	Everton	1–2	West Ham United	Southport
14:00 BST (UTC+01:00)	Walker 5'	Report; Box Score	Ross 27'; Lehmann 45'; Longhurst (yellow card) 86'; Kiernan (yellow card) 90'	Stadium: Merseyrail Community Stadium; Attendance: 143; Referee: Aaron Jackson

4 November 2018 6	Yeovil Town	1–0	Everton	Dorchester
15:00 BST (UTC+01:00)	Short 21'	Report; Box Score	Kelly (yellow card) 89'	Stadium: The Avenue Stadium; Attendance: 732

18 November 2018 7	Everton	0–4	Arsenal	Southport
14:00 BST (UTC+01:00)	Kelly (yellow card) 63'	Report; Box Score	van de Donk 44'; Nobbs 49'; Miedema 50', 65'	Stadium: Merseyrail Community Stadium; Attendance: 370; Referee: Lucy Oliver

25 November 2018 8	Reading	2–1	Everton	Buckinghamshire
14:00 BST (UTC+01:00)	Chaplen 20', 77'	Report; Box Score	Cain 13' (yellow card) 46'; Magill (yellow card) 53'	Stadium: High Wycombe; Attendance: 285; Referee: Amy Fearn

2 December 2018 9	Everton	2–1	Liverpool	Southport
14:00 BST (UTC+01:00)	Kaagman 6'; Magill 40'	Box Score	Clarke 12'; Linnett (yellow card) 90'	Stadium: Merseyrail Community Stadium

9 December 2018 10	Everton	0–2	Bristol City	Southport
14:00 BST (UTC+01:00)	Finnigan (yellow card) 24'	Report; Box Score	Rutherford 65'; Rood 90+1'	Stadium: Merseyrail Community Stadium; Attendance: 211

6 January 2019 11	Chelsea	3–0	Everton	Kingston upon Thames
14:00 BST (UTC+01:00)	England 6'; Spence 60'; Blundell 69'	Report; Box Score		Stadium: Kingsmeadow; Attendance: 3,221; Referee: Lee Brennan

13 January 2019 12	Brighton & Hove Albion	0–0	Everton	Crawley
14:00 BST (UTC+01:00)	Williams (yellow card) 66'	Report; Box Score	James (yellow card) 89'	Stadium: Broadfield Stadium; Attendance: 454; Referee: Sunny Gil

10 February 2019 PP	Everton	v	Birmingham City	Southport
14:00 BST (UTC+01:00)				Stadium: Merseyrail Community Stadium

21 February 2019 13	Manchester City	3–1	Everton	Manchester
14:00 BST (UTC+01:00)	Walsh 47'; Beckie 55'; Parris 90'	Report; Box Score	Boye-Hlorkah 12'	Stadium: Academy Stadium

14 March 2019 14	West Ham United	0–1	Everton	Romford
14:00 BST (UTC+01:00)		Report; Box Score	Cain 88'; Levell (yellow card) 90+7'	Stadium: Rush Green Stadium; Attendance: 607

24 March 2019 15	Bristol City	1–0	Everton	Filton
14:00 BST (UTC+01:00)	Graham 33'	Report; Box Score	Stringer (yellow card) 61'; Cain (yellow card) 90+4'	Stadium: Stoke Gifford Stadium; Attendance: 495; Referee: Stacey Pearson

31 March 2019 16	Everton	0–1	Yeovil Town	Southport
14:00 BST (UTC+01:00)		Report; Box Score	Alexander 78'	Stadium: Merseyrail Community Stadium; Attendance: 230; Referee: Jill Short

17 April 2019 17	Everton	1–3	Birmingham City	Southport
14:00 BST (UTC+01:00)	Kaagman 8'	Report; Box Score	Ladd 9'; White 34', 67'	Stadium: Merseyrail Community Stadium; Attendance: 103

21 April 2019 18	Arsenal	2–1	Everton	Borehamwood
14:00 BST (UTC+01:00)	Quinn 4'; Miedema 28' ven de Donk (yellow card) 56'	Report; Box Score	Boye-Hlorkah 61'; Stringer (yellow card) 56'; Finnigan (yellow card) 64'	Stadium: Meadow Park; Attendance: 2,003; Referee: Stacey Pearson

28 April 2019 19	Everton	3–2	Reading	Southport
14:00 BST (UTC+01:00)	Kaagman 40'; Boye-Hlorkah 52'; Magill 65'; Worm (yellow card) 86'; Stinger (yellow card) 89'	Report; Box Score	Allen 8'; Pearce (yellow card) 53'; Williams 77'	Stadium: Merseyrail Community Stadium; Attendance: 174; Referee: Andrew Kitchen

12 May 2019 20	Liverpool	3–1	Everton	Birkenhead
14:00 BST (UTC+01:00)	Sweetman-Kirk 26'; Charles 31'; Robe (yellow card) 67'; Rodgers 88'	Report; Box Score	Finnigan (yellow card) 24'; Stringer 39'	Stadium: Prenton Park; Attendance: 1,842; Referee: Andrew Sykes

=== FA WSL Cup ===
Everton was drawn into Group Two North for the 2018–19 FA WSL Cup. Despite opening the tournament with a win over Reading, Everton was officially eliminated from qualifying to the Quarter Finals after a home loss to Manchester United.

Pos	Team	Pld	W	WPEN	LPEN	L	GF	GA	GD	Pts	Qualification	MNU	REA	EVE	DUR	LIV
1	Manchester United	4	3	0	0	1	5	2	+3	9	Advance to knock-out stage	—	0–2	—	1–0	—
2	Reading	4	2	0	1	1	9	5	+4	7	Advance to knock-out stage	—	—	—	4–1	1–1
3	Everton	4	2	0	0	2	6	7	−1	6		0–3	3–2	—	—	—
4	Durham	4	1	0	1	2	5	8	−3	4		—	—	1–0	—	3–3
5	Liverpool	4	0	2	0	2	5	8	−3	4		0–1	—	1–3	—	—

Source: thefa.com
Rules for classification: 1) Points; 2) Goal difference; 3) Number of goals scored

=== FA Cup ===
3 February 2019 Fourth Round Proper	Everton	0–2	Chelsea	Cheshire
14:00 BST (UTC+01:00)		Report; Box Score	Spence 66'; Blundell 90'	Stadium: The Select Security Stadium

== Statistics ==
As of 1 May 2019

Players without any appearance are not included.

No.	Pos	Nat	Player	Total		FA WSL		WSL Cup		FA Cup	
No.	Pos	Nat	Player	Apps	Goals	Apps	Goals	Apps	Goals	Apps	Goals
Goalkeepers:
1	GK	(England) ENG	Kirstie Levell	22	0	18	0	3	0	1	0
25	GK	(Scotland) SCO	Becky Flaherty	1	0	0	0	1	0	0	0
Defenders:
2	DF	(England) ENG	Faye Bryson	12	0	5+3	0	3+1	0	0	0
3	DF	(England) ENG	Danielle Turner	16	0	11+1	0	2+1	0	1	0
4	DF	(England) ENG	Georgia Brougham	21	0	15+1	0	4	0	1	0
5	DF	(Netherlands) NED	Siri Worm	13	0	9+2	0	1	0	0+1	0
6	DF	(England) ENG	Gabrielle George	21	1	16	1	4	0	1	0
14	DF	(England) ENG	Taylor Hinds	13	0	10+1	0	2	0	0	0
24	DF	(Scotland) SCO	Emma Brownlie	6	0	5	0	0	0	1	0
Midfielders:
8	MF	(Netherlands) NED	Inessa Kaagman	21	5	15+2	4	3	1	1	0
12	MF	(Wales) WAL	Angharad James	22	0	16+1	0	4	0	1	0
13	MF	(England) ENG	Abbey-Leigh Stringer	16	0	11+2	0	1+1	0	1	0
17	MF	(New Zealand) NZL	Olivia Chance	0	0	0	0	0	0	0	0
20	MF	(England) ENG	Megan Finnigan	21	0	16+1	0	3	0	1	0
22	MF	(Netherlands) NED	Dominique Bruinenberg	18	0	7+6	0	2+2	0	0+1	0
28	MF	(Wales) WAL	Elise Hughes	12	1	3+7	0	1	1	1	0
Forwards:
7	FW	(England) ENG	Chantelle Boye-Hlorkah	20	3	7+8	2	1+3	1	0+1	0
9	FW	(England) ENG	Claudia Walker	13	3	4+5	1	3+1	2	0	0
10	FW	(Northern Ireland) NIR	Simone Magill	20	3	14+1	2	3+1	1	1	0
11	FW	(England) ENG	Chloe Kelly	14	1	10+1	1	3	0	0	0
16	FW	(England) ENG	Hannah Cain	11	2	5+6	2	0	0	0	0
