= 2017–18 FA WSL Cup =

Tournament details
- Country: England
- Dates: 11 October 2017 – 14 March 2018
- Teams: 20

Final positions
- Champions: Arsenal
- Runners-up: Manchester City

Tournament statistics
- Matches played: 47
- Goals scored: 180 (3.83 per match)
- Attendance: 22,859 (486 per match)
- Top goal scorer: (England) Fran Kirby Chelsea (7 Goals)

The 2017–18 FA WSL Cup was the seventh edition of the FA WSL's league cup competition. It was sponsored by Continental AG, who sponsored the competition from its creation, and was officially known as the FA WSL Continental Tyres Cup. All 20 teams of the two divisions of the WSL took part in the competition - the largest field in its history.

Manchester City were the defending champions; only they and Arsenal had won the cup in the previous six seasons it was contested in.

== Format changes ==
After a one-year experiment with a pure knockout formula, the WSL Cup returned to a format featuring a group stage. Four groups of five teams each, with an approximately even split between the two divisions, competed for two qualification spots for the knock-out round in each group, with each team playing every other team only once. Similarly to previous iterations, the groups had a geographical split, with two "Northern" groups and two "Southern". Another new implementation for the season was an automatic penalty shoot-out for all games tied after 90 minutes, with a bonus point awarded for the team who emerged victorious afterwards.

After the group stage, the remaining eight teams contested a non-seeded standard knock-out format as in the 2015 season.

== Group stage ==
=== Group One North ===
Pos	Team	Pld	W	WPEN	LPEN	L	GF	GA	GD	Pts	Qualification	SUN	LIV	SHE	AST	DUR
1	Sunderland	4	2	2	0	0	5	2	+3	10	Advance to knock-out stage	—	1–0	—	3–1	—
2	Liverpool	4	2	1	0	1	11	2	+9	8	Advance to knock-out stage	—	—	6–0	5–1	—
3	Sheffield	4	1	0	2	1	8	10	−2	5		1–1	—	—	—	5–1
4	Aston Villa	4	1	1	0	2	7	12	−5	5		—	—	2–2	—	3–2
5	Durham	4	0	0	2	2	3	8	−5	2		0–0	0–0	—	—	—

Source: FA WSL
Rules for classification: 1) Points; 2) Goal difference; 3) Number of goals scored
11 October 2017

Liverpool	6–0	Sheffield
Weir 10', 29'; Gilliatt 52' (o.g.); Ingle 65'; Johnson 83'; England 90'	Report

Select Security Stadium, Widnes
Attendance: 352
Referee: Simon Mather
11 October 2017

Durham	0–0	Sunderland
	Report
Penalties
	2–3

New Ferens Park, Durham
Attendance: 641

1 November 2017

Sheffield	5–1	Durham
Cox 2'; Johnson 24', 29', 66'; Housley 36'	Report	Atkinson 26'

Home of Football, Sheffield
Attendance: 122
1 November 2017

Sunderland	3–1	Aston Villa
Staniforth 28', 57'; Bruinenberg 76'	Report	Brown 90'

Mariners Park, South Shields
Attendance: 228

5 November 2017

Aston Villa	2–2	Sheffield
Welsh 42'; Salmon 80'	Report	Housley 18'; Johnson 90+4'
Penalties
	11–10

The Lamb Ground, Tamworth
Attendance: 140
5 November 2017

Durham	0–0	Liverpool
	Report
Penalties
Hill (penalty scored); Wilson (penalty scored); Hepple (penalty missed); Worthington (penalty scored); Johnson (penalty missed); Atkinson (penalty scored); Christon (penalty missed); Gears (penalty missed)	4–5	(penalty missed) Greenwood; (penalty scored) Coombs; (penalty missed) Bonner; (penalty scored) England; (penalty scored) Harding; (penalty scored) Stoney; (penalty missed) Charles; (penalty scored) Weir

New Ferens Park, Durham
Attendance: 351
Referee: Helen Byrne

15 November 2017

Liverpool	5–1	Aston Villa
Hodson 17'; Clarke 38'; Greenwood 49' (pen.); Weir 85'; Johnson 87'	Report	Jones 67'

Select Security Stadium, Widnes
Attendance: 282
Referee: Natalie Aspinall
16 November 2017

Sheffield	1–1	Sunderland
Lord-Mears 44'	Report	Staniforth 33'
Penalties
	2–4

Home of Football, Sheffield

3 December 2017

Aston Villa	3–2	Durham
Baptiste 29'; Salmon 63'; Ejupi 87'	Report	Atkinson 22'; Ness 90+1'

The Lamb Ground, Tamworth
5 December 2017

Sunderland	1–0	Liverpool
Galloway 13'	Report

Mariners Park, South Shields
Attendance: 128
Referee: Matthew Dicicco

=== Group Two North ===
Pos	Team	Pld	W	WPEN	LPEN	L	GF	GA	GD	Pts	Qualification	MCI	EVE	BIR	DON	OXF
1	Manchester City	4	4	0	0	0	13	3	+10	12	Advance to knock-out stage	—	2–1	2–0	—	—
2	Everton	4	3	0	0	1	9	2	+7	9	Advance to knock-out stage	—	—	1–0	—	4–0
3	Birmingham City	4	2	0	0	2	7	5	+2	6		—	—	—	3–2	4–0
4	Doncaster Rovers Belles	4	1	0	0	3	9	10	−1	3		2–3	0–3	—	—	—
5	Oxford United	4	0	0	0	4	1	19	−18	0		0–6	—	—	1–5	—

Source: FA WSL
Rules for classification: 1) Points; 2) Goal difference; 3) Number of goals scored
11 October 2017

Birmingham City	4–0	Oxford United
Ayisi 38'; Quinn 55'; Ladd 86'; Wellings 89'	Report

Damson Park, Solihull
12 October 2017

Doncaster Rovers Belles	0–3	Everton
	Report; Box Score	Kelly 6'; Little 23' (o.g.); Munsterman 86'

Keepmoat Stadium, Doncaster
Attendance: 482
Referee: Luke Watson

2 November 2017

Oxford United	0–6	Manchester City
	Report	Christiansen 44'; Stanway 45', 53'; Emslie 57'; Beattie 79', 86'

Court Place Farm, Marston
Attendance: 777
2 November 2017

Everton	1–0	Birmingham City
Sweetman-Kirk 12'	Report; Box Score

Select Security Stadium, Widnes
Attendance: 181
Referee: Andy Spence

5 November 2017

Birmingham City	3–2	Doncaster Rovers Belles
Ayisi 45'; Wellings 58'; Williams 85'	Report	Murray 36'; Hanson 76'

Damson Park, Solihull
Attendance: 682
5 November 2017

Manchester City	2–1	Everton
Christiansen 25'; Parris 80'	Report	Magill 77'

Academy Stadium, Manchester
Attendance: 873
Referee: Samuel Barrott

16 November 2017

Everton	4–0	Oxford United
Kelly 10', 81', 83'; Walker 69'	Report; Box Score

Select Security Stadium, Widnes
Attendance: 188
Referee: Aaron Jackson

3 December 2017

Manchester City	2–0	Birmingham City
Parris 18'; Emslie 36'	Report

Academy Stadium, Manchester
Attendance: 1,077
Referee: Christopher Porter
3 December 2017

Oxford United	1–5	Doncaster Rovers Belles
Short 12'	Report	Rayner 2', 4'; Murray 69', 86'; Sigsworth 73'

Court Place Farm, Marston
Attendance: 172
6 December 2017

Doncaster Rovers Belles	2–3	Manchester City
Sigsworth 53'; Murray 75'	Report	Emslie 4'; Ross 55'; Stanway 58'

Keepmoat Stadium, Doncaster
Attendance: 924
Referee: Rebecca Welch

=== Group One South ===
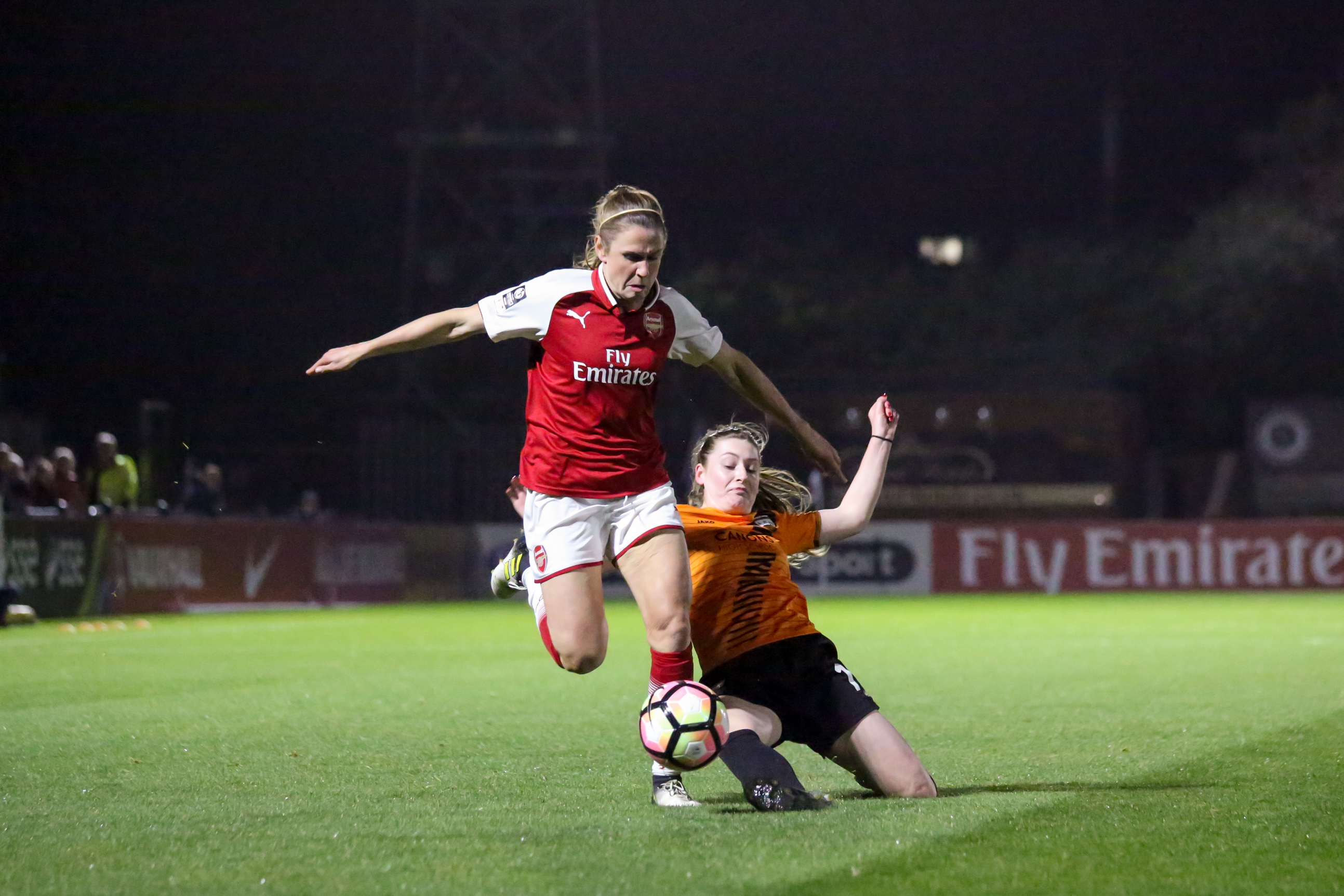
Group match between Arsenal and London Bees.

Pos	Team	Pld	W	WPEN	LPEN	L	GF	GA	GD	Pts	Qualification	REA	ARS	WAT	MIL	LON
1	Reading	4	4	0	0	0	15	1	+14	12	Advance to knock-out stage	—	—	4–0	—	4–0
2	Arsenal	4	3	0	0	1	19	4	+15	9	Advance to knock-out stage	1–2	—	—	—	7–0
3	Watford	4	1	0	1	2	2	11	−9	4		—	0–6	—	1–0	—
4	Millwall Lionesses	4	1	0	0	3	6	14	−8	3		0–5	2–5	—	—	—
5	London Bees	4	0	1	0	3	4	16	−12	2		—	—	1–1	3–4	—

Source: FA WSL
Rules for classification: 1) Points; 2) Goal difference; 3) Number of goals scored
12 October 2017

Watford	1–0	Millwall Lionesses
Fatuga-Dada 73'	Report

Gaywood Park, Kings Langley
12 October 2017

Arsenal	7–0	London Bees
Evans 24'; Mukandi 34', 37'; Taylor 42'; Mead 58' (pen.), 78' (pen.); Quinn 83'	Report

Meadow Park, Borehamwood

1 November 2017

Reading	4–0	Watford
Williams 5'; Bartrip 45'; Linnett 69'; Green 90+1'	Report

Adams Park, High Wycombe
Attendance: 211
1 November 2017

Millwall Lionesses	2–5	Arsenal
Mason 20'; Rutherford 69'	Report	Mead 11'; Nobbs 43', 74'; Carter 78'; James 90' (pen.)

St Paul's Sports Ground, Rotherhithe
Attendance: 451

5 November 2017

London Bees	3–4	Millwall Lionesses
Toussaint 3', 84'; Wilson 14'	Report	Dean 40'; Hincks 51', 73'; Mason 60'

The Hive, Canons Park
Attendance: 243
5 November 2017

Arsenal	1–2	Reading
Mead 62'	Report	Williams 56', 63'

Meadow Park, Borehamwood
Attendance: 380

15 November 2017

Reading	4–0	London Bees
Pearce 57'; Chaplen 60'; Rowe 75'; Furness 90'	Report

Madejski Stadium, Reading
Attendance: 2,110
16 November 2017

Watford	0–6	Arsenal
	Report 1 Report 2	Taylor 15', 78'; Carter 46'; Mukandi 60'; Janssen 74'; van de Donk 75'

Gaywood Park, Kings Langley
Attendance: 823

3 December 2017

London Bees	1–1	Watford
Beckett 82' (pen.)		Babajide 45'
Penalties
	4–3

The Hive, Canons Park
5 December 2017

Millwall Lionesses	0–5	Reading
	Report	Chaplen 38', 85'; Furness 52', 65'; Bruton 60'

St Paul's Sports Ground, Rotherhithe

=== Group Two South ===
Pos	Team	Pld	W	WPEN	LPEN	L	GF	GA	GD	Pts	Qualification	CHE	BRI	BHA	TOT	YEO
1	Chelsea	4	4	0	0	0	17	2	+15	12	Advance to knock-out stage	—	—	—	4–1	8–0
2	Bristol City	4	2	0	0	2	6	4	+2	6	Advance to knock-out stage	1–2	—	3–0	—	—
3	Brighton & Hove Albion	4	2	0	0	2	8	9	−1	6		0–3	—	—	—	4–2
4	Tottenham Hotspur	4	2	0	0	2	6	9	−3	6		—	2–0	1–4	—	—
5	Yeovil Town	4	0	0	0	4	3	16	−13	0		—	0–2	—	1–2	—

Source: FA WSL
Rules for classification: 1) Points; 2) Goal difference; 3) Number of goals scored
11 October 2017

Brighton & Hove Albion	4–2	Yeovil Town
Gibbons 28'; Umotong 42'; Natkiel 44', 70'	Report	Sawyer 90+1'; Green 90+5'

Culver Road, Lancing
12 October 2017

Tottenham Hotspur	2–0	Bristol City
Pickett 41'; Baptiste 66'	Report

Theobalds Lane, Cheshunt

1 November 2017

Brighton & Hove Albion	0–3	Chelsea
	Report	Kirby 13'; Dunn 76'; So-yun 90'

Culver Road, Lancing
Attendance: 364
1 November 2017
14:45

Yeovil Town	1–2	Tottenham Hotspur
Evans 36'	Report	Wiltshire 63'; Humes 90+'

Huish Park, Yeovil
Attendance: 283

4 November 2017

Bristol City	1–2	Chelsea
Turner 85'	Report	Aluko 47'; Carney 90' (pen.)

Stoke Gifford Stadium, Filton
Attendance: 400
5 November 2017

Tottenham Hotspur	1–4	Brighton & Hove Albion
Baptiste 15'	Report	Somes 18'; Whelan 31'; Martin 78'; Umotong 83'

Theobalds Lane, Cheshunt
Attendance: 215

15 November 2017

Yeovil Town	0–2	Bristol City
	Report	Hemp 31'; Daniels 62'

Viridor Stadium, Taunton

2 December 2017

Bristol City	3–0	Brighton & Hove Albion
Kerkdijk 24'; Hemp 54' (pen.); Daniels 88'	Report

Stoke Gifford Stadium, Filton
Attendance: 224
3 December 2017

Chelsea	8–0	Yeovil Town
Dunn 5'; Cousins 19' (o.g.); Cuthbert 45+4', 57'; Spence 45+13', 90+4'; Kirby 72' (pen.); Davison 90+2'	Report

Kingsmeadow, Kingston upon Thames
Attendance: 1,289
5 December 2017

Chelsea	4–1	Tottenham Hotspur
Blundell 24'; Kirby 44', 56'; Spence 77'	Report	Pickett 65'

Kingsmeadow, Kingston upon Thames
Attendance: 1,541

== Knock-out stage ==
Quarter-finals
Everton	1 (3)
Reading (pen.)	1 (4)
Arsenal	3
Sunderland	1
Chelsea	5
Liverpool	1
Bristol City	0
Manchester City	2

Semi-finals
Reading	2
Arsenal	3
Chelsea	0
Manchester City	1

Final
Arsenal	1
Manchester City	0

=== Quarter-finals ===
16 December 2017
18:00 GMT (UTC+00:00)

Everton	1–1 (a.e.t.)	Reading
Kelly 112'	Report Report	Linnett 94'
Penalties
Kelly (penalty missed); Turner (penalty missed)	3–4	(penalty scored) Linnett

Select Security Stadium, Widnes
Attendance: 155
Referee: Benjamin Speedie

17 December 2017
14:00 GMT (UTC+00:00)

Arsenal	3–1	Sunderland
Nobbs 15'; Miedema 38'; Mead 75'	Report	Galloway 55'

Meadow Park, Borehamwood
Attendance: 400
Referee: Josh Smith

17 December 2017
14:00 GMT (UTC+00:00)

Bristol City	0–2	Manchester City
	Report	Parris 62'; Beattie 88'

Oaklands Park, Almondsbury
Attendance: 352
Referee: Savvas Yianni

17 December 2017
14:00 GMT (UTC+00:00)

Chelsea	5–1	Liverpool
Kirby 4', 24', 63'; Bachmann 23'; Cuthbert 78'	Report	Stoney 51'

Kingsmeadow, Kingston upon Thames
Attendance: 1,161
Referee: Alex Burke

=== Semi-finals ===
14 January 2018
14:00 GMT (UTC+00:00)

Chelsea	0–1	Manchester City
	Report	Nadim 19'

Kingsmeadow, Kingston upon Thames
Attendance: 2,595
Referee: Rebecca Welch

14 January 2018
14:00 GMT (UTC+00:00)

Reading	2–3	Arsenal
Chaplen 7'; Bruton 70'	Report	Mead 5'; Miedema 80'; Nobbs 83'

Adams Park, High Wycombe
Attendance: 749
Referee: Ryan Atkin

=== Final ===
14 March 2018
19:00 GMT (UTC+00:00)

Arsenal	1–0	Manchester City
Miedema 32'	Report

Adams Park, High Wycombe
Attendance: 2,136
Referee: Amy Fearn (Derbyshire)

== Top goalscorers ==
As of 18 December 2017.

Rank	Player	Team	Goals
1	(England) Fran Kirby	Chelsea	7
2	(England) Chloe Kelly	Everton	5
3	(Jamaica) Melissa Johnson	Sheffield	4
3	(Scotland) Christie Murray	Doncaster Rovers Belles	4

== See also ==
- 2017–18 FA WSL
