= Faye Bryson =

English footballer

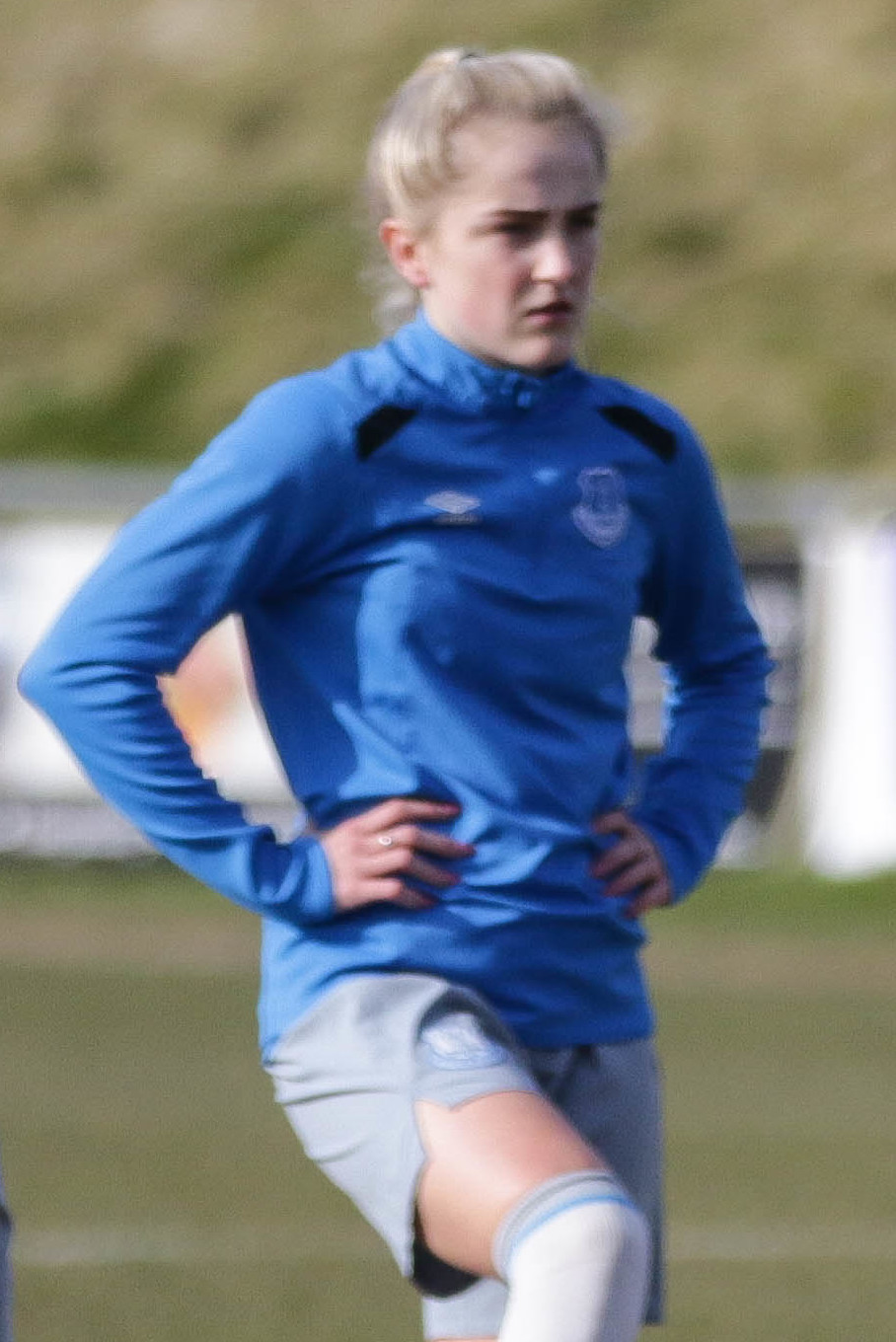
- Faye Bryson in February 2018

Personal information
- Full name: Faye Louise Bryson
- Date of birth: 4 July 1997 (age 29)
- Place of birth: Liverpool, England
- Height: 1.58 m (5 ft 2 in)
- Position: Defender

Youth career
- –2009: Liverpool
- 2009–2015: Everton

Senior career*
Years	Team	Apps	(Gls)
2015–2020	Everton	42	(1)
2020–2021	Bristol City	18	(1)
2021–2023	Reading	37	(1)
2023–2024	Central Coast Mariners	21	(1)
2024–2025	Sydney FC	17	(0)
2026–	Hibernian	0	(0)
- * Club domestic league appearances and goals as of 5 March 2026

Faye Louise Bryson is an English football player who plays as a defender for Scottish Women's Premier League club Hibernian. Bryson has previously played for English clubs Everton, Bristol City, and Reading and Australian clubs Central Coast Mariners and Sydney FC.

== Club career ==
=== Everton ===
Bryson began her youth career with Liverpool FC before being released and moving to Everton's academy where she captained the team in the 2014 FA Woman's Youth Cup final. Bryson made her senior debut in April 2015 in a WSL 2 match against London Bees. She scored her first goal for Everton against Aston Villa during the 2017 Spring Series.

=== Bristol City ===
On 18 January 2020, Bryson left Everton to sign with the FA WSL team Bristol City. On 1 July 2020, she signed a two year contract extension with the club.

=== Reading ===
On 6 July 2021, Bryson joined Reading, signing a two-year deal at the FA WSL club. After scoring one goal in 47 appearances, she departed the club in June 2023, at the end of her contract.

=== Central Coast Mariners ===
In September 2023, Bryson joined A-League Women club Central Coast Mariners. She scored her first goal for the club against Melbourne Victory on 26 November 2023, scoring in the 71st minute. Bryson made 21 league appearances during her time with the club.

=== Sydney FC ===
In September 2024, Bryson joined A-League Women club Sydney FC. In June 2025, the club announced she would not be retained for next season. Bryson left after playing 17 league matches for the club.

== Personal life ==
Bryson supports Liverpool, but joined Everton in order to develop better as a youth player.

Bryson is in a relationship with Hibernian teammate Kyah Simon.

== Career statistics ==
As of match played 8 November 2024

Appearances and goals by club, season and competition
Club	Season	League			National Cup		League Cup		Total	
Club	Season	Division	Apps	Goals	Apps	Goals	Apps	Goals	Apps	Goals
Everton	2017	FA Women's Super League	8	1	0	0	-		8	1
Everton	2017–18	FA Women's Super League	11	0	4	0	3	0	18	0
Everton	2018–19	FA Women's Super League	8	0	0	0	4	0	12	0
Everton	2019–20	FA Women's Super League	0	0	0	0	1	0	1	0
Everton	Total		27	1	4	0	8	0	39	1
Bristol City	2019–20	FA Women's Super League	3	0	2	0	0	0	5	0
Bristol City	2020–21	FA Women's Super League	15	1	0	0	2	0	17	1
Bristol City	Total		18	1	2	0	2	0	22	1
Reading	2021–22	FA Women's Super League	20	1	2	0	2	0	24	1
Reading	2022–23	FA Women's Super League	17	0	3	0	3	0	23	0
Reading	Total		37	1	5	0	5	0	47	1
Central Coast Mariners FC	2022–23	A-League	14	1	0	0	0	0	14	1
Sydney FC	2023-24	A-League	1	0	0	0	0	0	1	0
Career total			97	4	11	0	15	0	123	4
