= Aileen Whelan =

English footballer

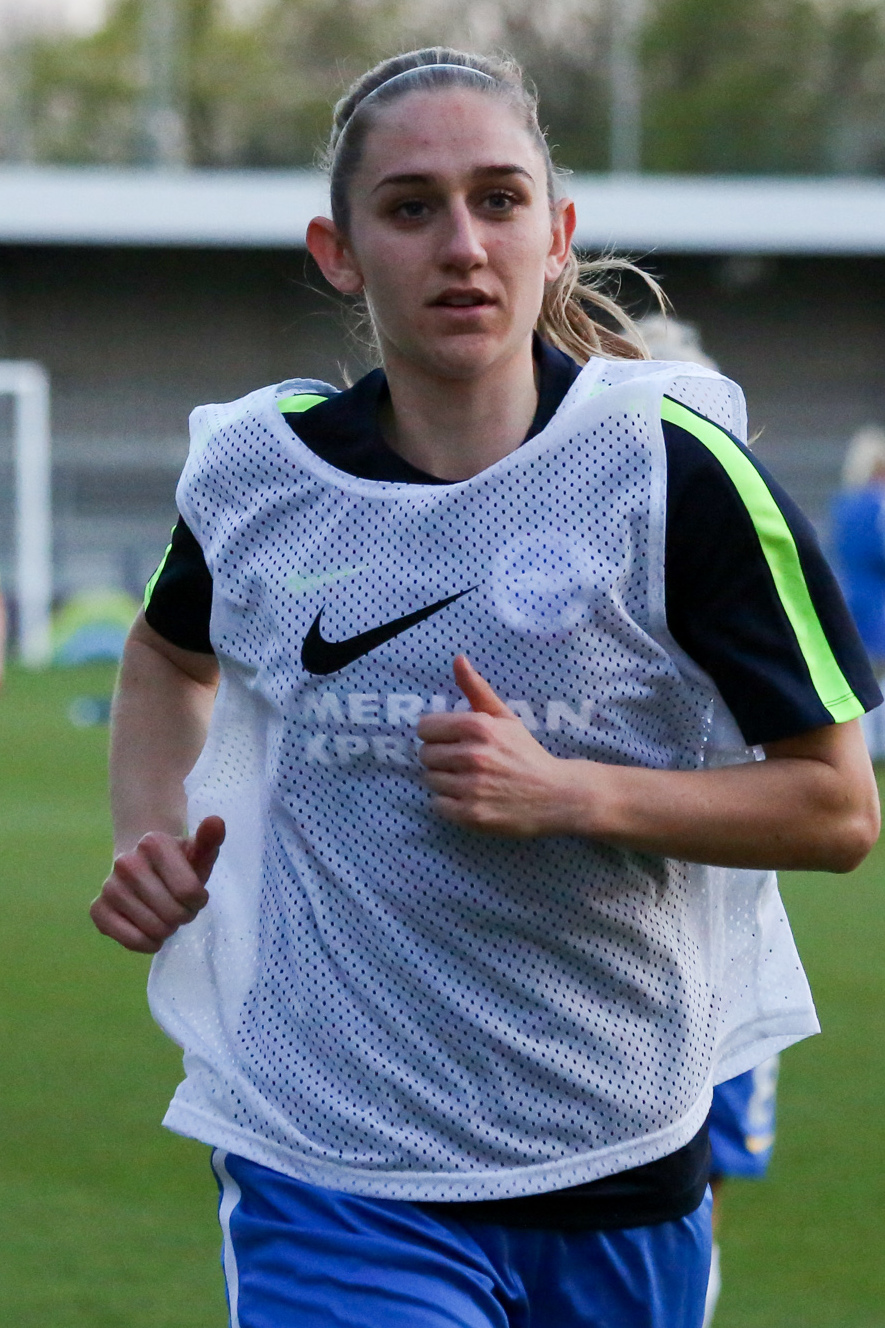
- Whelan in 2018

Personal information
- Full name: Aileen Mary Whelan
- Date of birth: 11 August 1991 (age 35)
- Place of birth: Stafford, England
- Height: 1.70 m (5 ft 7 in)
- Positions: Midfielder; forward

Youth career
- Rugby Town Girls FC

Senior career*
Years	Team	Apps	(Gls)
- Rushden & Diamonds F.C.
- Barnet Ladies F.C.
2009–2011	Milton Keynes Dons		
2011–2013	Nottingham Forest	22	(10)
2013–2017	Notts County	58	(9)
2017	Everton	2	(1)
2017–2022	Brighton & Hove Albion	70	(17)
2022–2024	Leicester City	36	(2)

International career^{‡}
- England U23
Medal record
Women's football
Representing Great Britain
Summer Universiade
Gold medal – first place	2013 Kazan	Team
- * Club domestic league appearances and goals as of 21:23, 9 March 2024 (UTC) ‡ National team caps and goals as of 6 October 2018

Aileen Mary Whelan (born 11 August 1991) is an English former professional footballer who last plays as a midfielder or forward for Women's Super League club Leicester City. Whelan started her playing career in 1996 at Rugby Town Girls FC, after it was set up by Steve Heighton and Michelle Guppy and her father Declan became a coach.

== Club career ==
Whelan started her senior career turning out for Rushden & Diamonds F.C., Barnet Ladies F.C. and Milton Keynes Dons. She then signed for Nottingham Forest, ahead of their 2011–12 Women's Premier League season and scored on her debut for the club. She stayed with Forest for the 2012–13 season.

Whelan transferred to Notts County during the summer of 2013 ahead of their maiden season in the FA WSL.

She left the club following its folding and joined Everton in May 2017. Everton went on to win the FA WSL 2 Spring Series.

Whelan signed for FA WSL 2 side Brighton & Hove Albion in September 2017. During her first season at the club she was named February 2018 WSL 2 Player of the Month. The club joined FA WSL 1, the top tier of women's football in England, ahead of the 2018–19 season.

== International career ==
Whelan represented England at their under-23 level. She also competed for Team GB at the World Student Games in 2013, winning the gold medal.

== Personal life ==
Whelan holds a master's degree in child psychology and works part-time as a play therapist outside of football. She has a young child with her partner, former Brighton defender Fern Whelan.

== Honours ==
Everton

- FA WSL 2 Spring Series: 2017

International

- Summer Universiade: 2013

Individual

- Brighton & Hove Albion Player of the Season: 2018-19, 2020-21
