= Adekite Fatuga-Dada =

English footballer (born 1996)

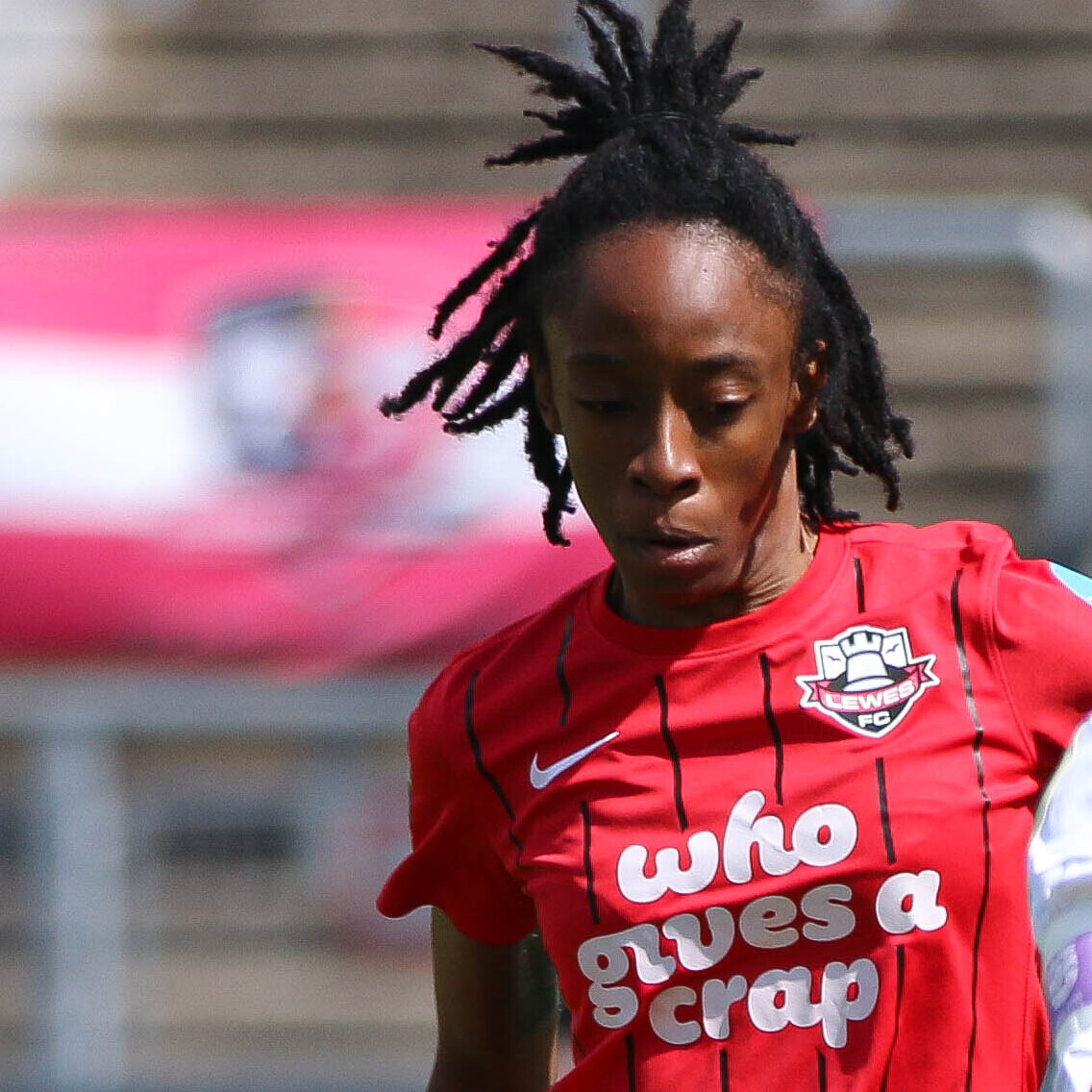
- Fatuga-Dada playing for Lewes in 2024

Personal information
- Date of birth: 5 September 1996 (age 30)

Team information
- Current team: Bolton Wanderers

Senior career*
Years	Team	Apps	(Gls)
2015–2023	Watford		
2023–2024	Milton Keynes Dons		
2024–2025	Lewes		
- * Club domestic league appearances and goals

Adekite Fatuga-Dada (born 5 September 1996) is a footballer who plays as a midfielder, winger, or striker for Bolton Wanderers. Born in England, she is eligible to represent Nigeria internationally. In 2024 she was playing for Lewes, before signing for Bolton in August 2025.

== Early life ==
Fatuga-Dada was born in London in 1996 to Nigerian parents. She was influenced to play football by her uncle and eventually was scouted by Watford through a program.

== Youth club career ==
At the age of twelve, she joined the youth academy of English side Watford before joining the youth academy of Arsenal, winning FA Youth Cup before returning to Watford in 2015.

== Senior club career ==
Fatuga-Dada started her senior career with English side Watford. She worked at Converse while playing for the club. In 2020, she temporarily changed her jersey number to 96 to commemorate the year that American rapper Tupac Shakur died. The same year, she was awarded a PFA community champion award for community work that season.

In 2021, her goal she scored in a FA Women's Championship game against Blackburn Rovers was nominated for the clubs Goal of the Month. That same year, she achieved promotion with Watford to the English second tier.

In 2024 she had helped Watford to be promoted to a higher league but a decision was made to not renew her contract. She was still hopeful that she may be called up for Nigeria but she had to find another club. She was playing for Lewes later that year.

On 20 August 2025 she announced she had signed for Bolton Wanderers Womens team.

== International career ==
Fatuga-Dada is eligible to represent Nigeria internationally. She has represented England internationally at youth level and has been called up to represent Nigeria internationally.

== Personal life ==
Fatuga-Dada has been a supporter of English Premier League side Manchester United.
