= Andy Spence =

English football manager (born 1983)

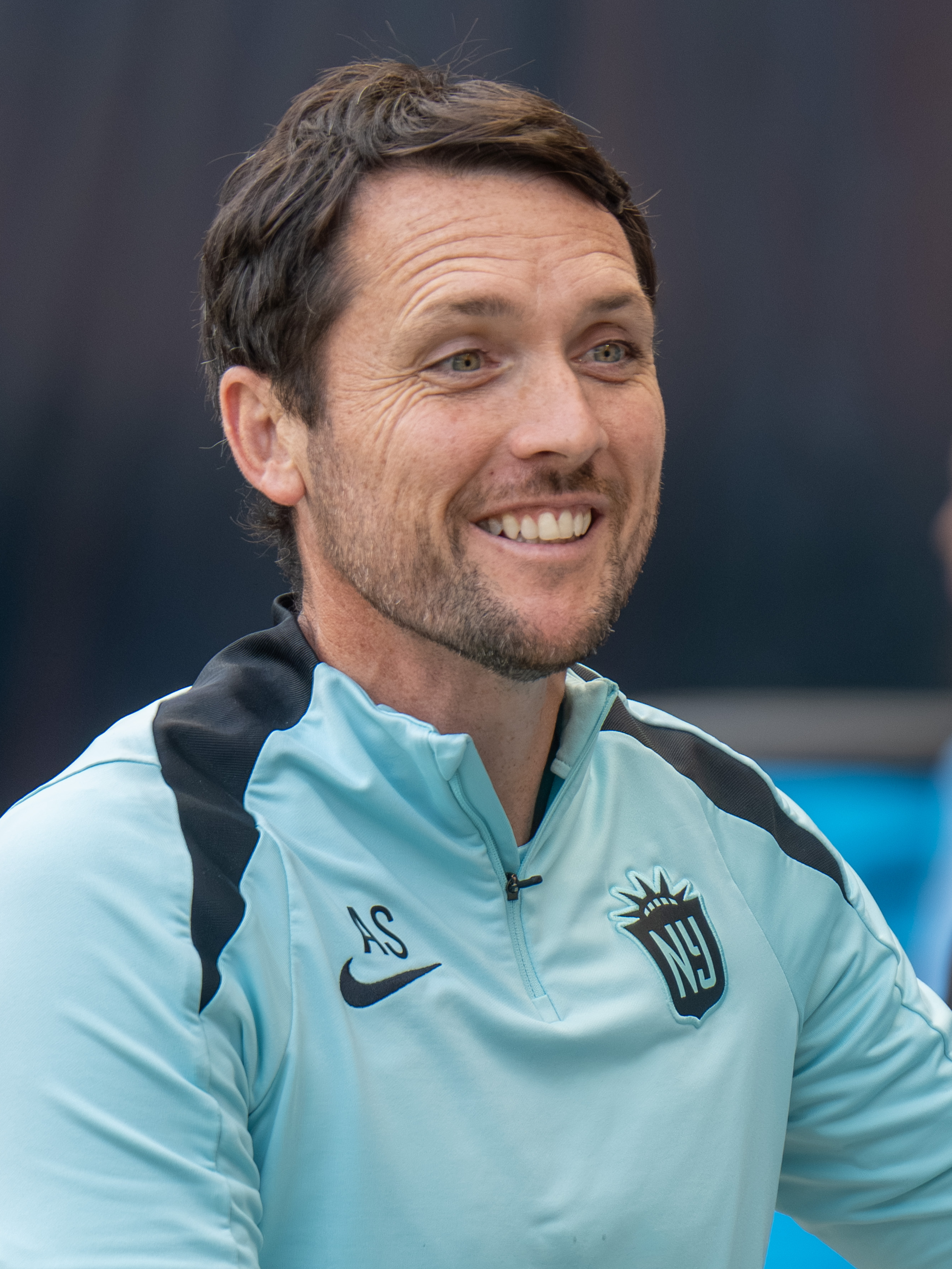
- Spence in 2025

Personal information
- Full name: Andrew Peter Spence
- Date of birth: 8 January 1983 (age 43)
- Place of birth: England

Team information
- Current team: Gotham (assistant head coach)

Managerial career
- Years: Team
- 2004–2012: Everton Ladies (assistant)
- 2012–2015: Everton Ladies
- 2016–2018: Everton Ladies
- 2022–2024: Canada Women (assistant)
- 2025–: Gotham (assistant)

Andrew Peter Spence (born 8 January 1983) is an English professional football coach who is currently assistant head coach of National Women's Soccer League team Gotham. He has previously coached Women's Super League club Everton and the Canada women's national team.

== Education ==
He is a diploma graduate in football management from the University of Liverpool and has a degree in science and football from the Liverpool John Moores University.

== Management career ==
=== First stint with Everton ===
The first position Spence held with Everton was a stint as director of the Everton Centre of Excellence, which is an academy program tasked with training girls between the ages of Under-9s through Under-17s.

By 2004, Spence began his Everton managing career as an assistant to Mo Marley. During his time as an assistant, Spence helped the club win the 2008 League Cup and the 2010 FA Cup.

On 14 November 2012 Marley stepped down at the end of the last campaign, naming Spence as the new first team manager. After three seasons with the Blues, Spence stepped down citing the club's need to move forward after being relegated at the conclusion of the 2014 season after 21 seasons in the top flight and struggling form in the FA WSL 2. He would be succeeded by Nicola Anderson and retake his position at the club's Centre of Excellence.

=== Return as Everton manager ===
After six months, Spence was re-appointed manager of Everton Spence would lead Everton to back-to-back third place WSL 2 finishes. In 2017, the FA WSL ran an interim season to re-align the season calendars between February and May called the FA WSL Spring Series. This interim season would not compete for promotion or relegation ahead of the 2017–18 season. Under Spence, Everton won the Spring Series with seven wins from nine matches and he was named FA WSL Coach of the Year.

Prior to the 2017–18 season, Notts County of the WSL 1 folded prior to the Spring Series prompting The Football Association to invite FA WSL 2 clubs to apply and fill the vacancy. Spence's Everton was awarded the invitation back into the top flight on 9 June 2017, and competed in the WSL 1 for the 2017–18 season.

After going winless through six matches in the FA WSL to open the 2018–19 campaign, Spence left his role as manager with Jennifer Herst being appointed interim manager.

=== Canada ===
Spence was appointed assistant head coach for Canada women's national team in 2022. He took temporary charge of the team at the 2024 Summer Olympics in Paris when head coach Bev Priestman was suspended after two members of her backroom staff were sent home for flying a drone over the New Zealand squad's training session in the build-up to the match between the two countries.

=== Gotham FC ===
In 2025, Spence joined American NWSL team Gotham FC as assistant head coach under Juan Carlos Amorós.

=== Managerial statistics ===
All competitive league games (league and domestic cup) and international matches (not including friendlies) are included.

As of 11 November 2018

Team	Nat	Year	Record				
Team	Nat	Year	G	W	D	L	Win %
Everton	(England)	2012–2015	51	16	13	22	31.37
Everton	(England)	2015–2018	45	19	5	21	42.22
Career total			96	35	18	43	36.46

== Honors ==
=== Manager ===
==== Everton Ladies ====
- FA WSL 2 Spring Series: 2017

==== Individual ====
- FA WSL Coach of the Year: 2017
