= Siri Worm =

Dutch footballer (born 1992)

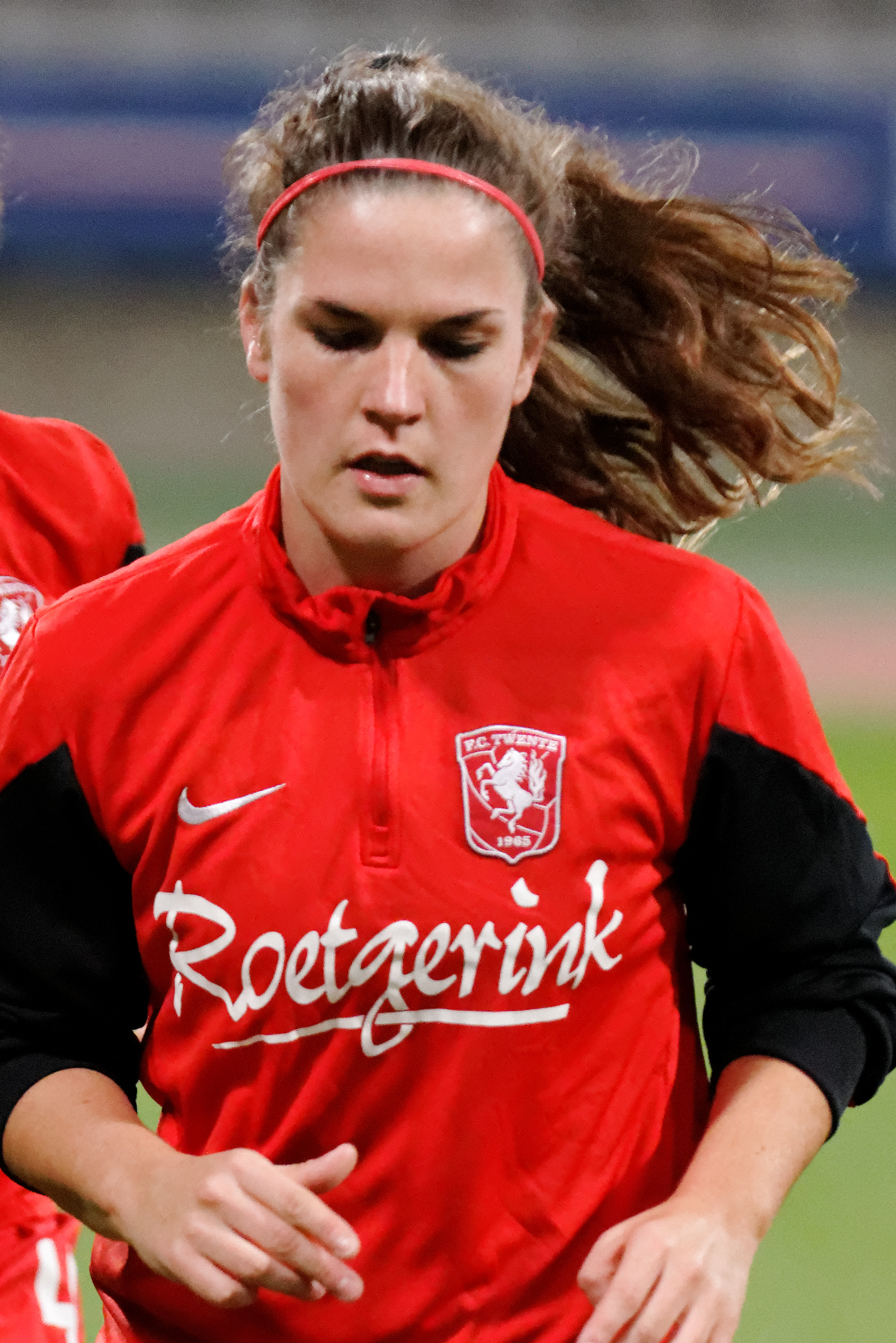
- Worm with Twente in 2014

Personal information
- Full name: Siri Worm
- Date of birth: 20 April 1992 (age 34)
- Place of birth: Doetinchem, Netherlands
- Height: 1.65 m (5 ft 5 in)
- Positions: Defender; leftback

Youth career
- 1999–2008: DZC'68
- 2007–2008: Twente

Senior career*
Years	Team	Apps	(Gls)
2008–2017	Twente	133	(8)
2017–2019	Everton	27	(0)
2019–2021	Tottenham Hotspur	23	(3)
2021–2022	Eintracht Frankfurt	5	(0)
2022–2025	PSV	2	(0)

International career^{‡}
2005–2007	Netherlands -16	4	(0)
2007–2009	Netherlands -17	21	(2)
2009–2011	Netherlands -19	33	(1)
2012–2019	Netherlands	41	(1)
- * Club domestic league appearances and goals as of June 2021 (UTC) ‡ National team caps and goals as of 12 Mai 2022

Siri Worm (born 20 April 1992) is a Dutch football defender who played for Eredivisie club PSV and the senior Netherlands women's national football team.

== Club career ==
=== Twente ===
Worm emerged from the youth academy of FC Twente. After several seasons as a reserve or utility player, she secured a place in the team at left back during the 2012–13 season, during which FC Twente were league champions and qualified for the UEFA Women's Champions League. FC Twente qualified for the Champions League 3 more times during Worm's tenure with the club.

=== Everton ===
Worm transferred to Everton in July 2017, part of a double transfer with teammate Marthe Munsterman.

=== Tottenham Hotspur ===
Following their promotion to the Women's Super League, in July 2019 Worm was announced as one of seven new Tottenham Hotspur signings.

Worm was released by Tottenham at the end of the 2020/21 FA Women's Super League season.

=== Eintracht Frankfurt ===
After four years in England Worm moved to Germany to play for Eintracht Frankfurt in the German Frauen-Bundesliga

=== PSV ===
One year later she signed a 2-year deal to play for PSV Eindhoven in her native country.

== International career ==
She was the captain of the Dutch Under-19 national team in the 2010 and 2011 U-19 European Championships.

In October 2012 coach Roger Reijners called Worm up to the senior national team, as a replacement for the injured Petra Hogewoning. She won her first cap on 25 November 2012, in a 2–0 friendly win over Wales.

Worm was named in the Netherlands squad for UEFA Women's Euro 2013 in Sweden. She made a substitute appearance in the 1–0 defeat to Norway, replacing established left back Claudia van den Heiligenberg for the last 30 minutes. In April 2019, Worm was named as one of seven players on the Netherlands' standby list for the 2019 FIFA Women's World Cup.

=== International goals ===
Scores and results list the Netherlands goal tally first.

Goal	Date	Venue	Opponent	Score	Result	Competition
1.	28 February 2018	Bela Vista Municipal Stadium, Parchal, Portugal	Japan	3–0	6–2	2018 Algarve Cup

== Honours ==
FC Twente

- Eredivisie: 2010–11, 2015–16
- BeNe League: 2012–13, 2013–14
- KNVB Women's Cup: 2014–15

Netherlands

- Algarve Cup: 2018
