= Danielle Turner =

English footballer (born 1991)

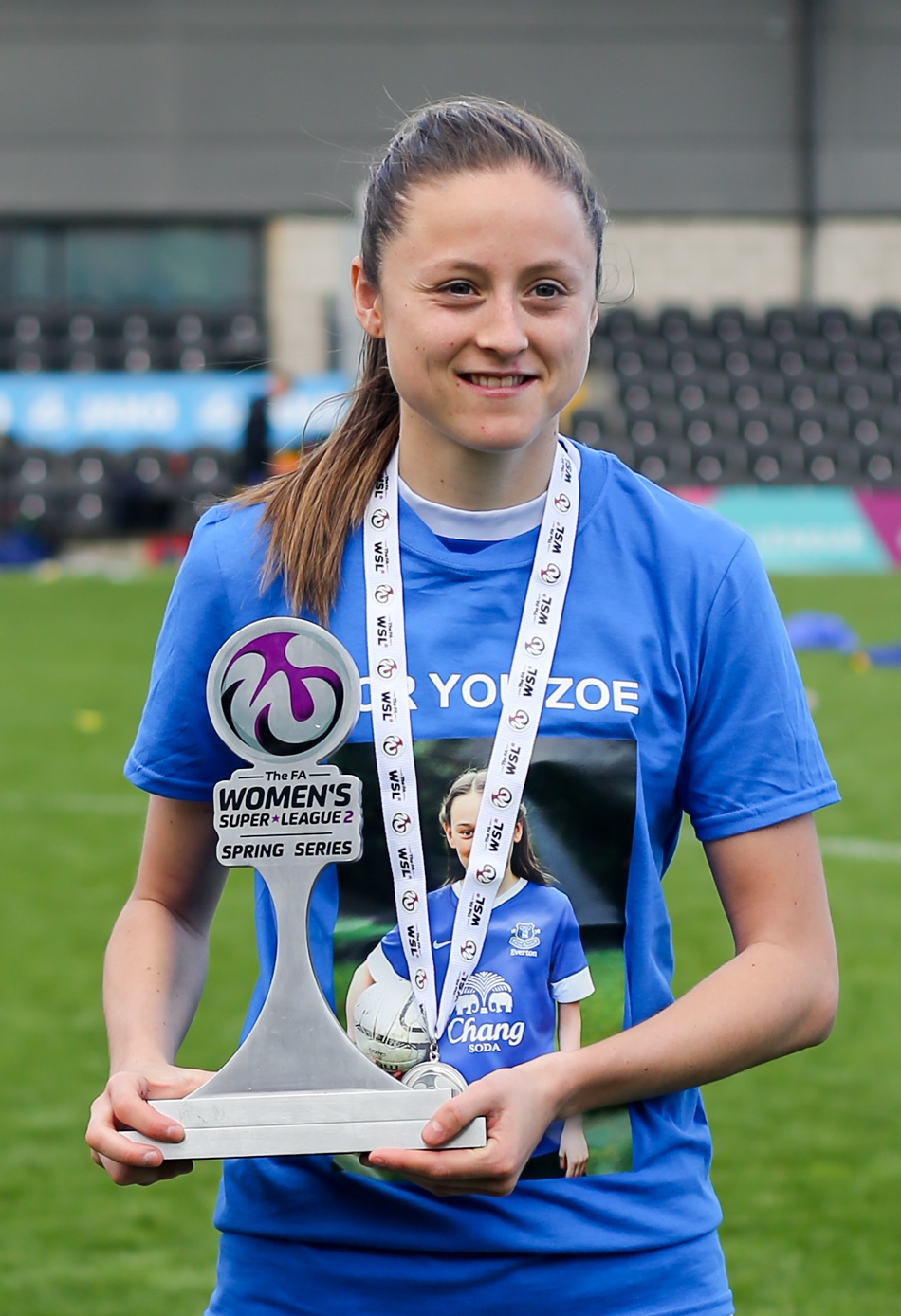
- Turner holding the FA WSL 2 Spring Series trophy on 20 May 2017

Personal information
- Date of birth: 10 September 1991 (age 35)
- Place of birth: Warrington, England
- Positions: Defender; forward

Team information
- Current team: Melbourne City
- Number: 3

Youth career
- 2001–2007: Manchester United
- 2007–2014: Everton

Senior career*
| Years | Team | Apps | (Gls) |
| 2012–2022 | Everton | 103 | (12) |
| 2012–2013 | → Stjarnan (loan) | 5 | (0) |
| 2022–2025 | Aston Villa | 56 | (1) |
| 2025– | Melbourne City | 7 | (0) |

International career^{‡}
- England Under-19
- England Under-23
- * Club domestic league appearances and goals as of 4 January 2026 ‡ National team caps and goals as of 6 January 2018

Danielle "Dan" Turner (born 10 September 1991) is an English professional footballer who plays as a defender for Melbourne City.

== Club career ==
Turner was at Manchester United initially before playing for Everton Ladies Centre of Excellence.

In 2012, Turner secured a loan move with Icelandic side, Stjarnan of the Úrvalsdeild kvenna. She made her league debut against Þór/KA on 13 May 2012. Turner featured for a successful stint with the Icelandic club who won the Women's Cup and the Supercup during the 2012 season. In 2013, Turner would help Stjarnan win the league, the Icelandic League Cup Women A, and finish as runners-up in the Supercup.

By the 2013 season, Turner would return to Everton L.F.C. and begin to regularly feature for the Blues. Her efforts earned her a two-year deal with Everton in December 2014.

Deployed as a left wing-back, Turner has been a regular for the Blues since signing her deal, scoring a career high seven goals during the 2015 season.

During the fourth round of 2016–17 FA Cup, Turner filled in for the injured Kirstie Levell as goalkeeper and was able to help the Blues past a shootout against Durham. The victory and performance earned Turner Player of the Round honours.

Turner was named team captain ahead of Everton's return to WSL 1 for 2017–18 season, succeeding the departing Michelle Hinnigan. She announced her departure from Everton on 24 June 2022 after 15 years at the club.

=== Aston Villa ===
On 11 July 2022, Turner was announced at Aston Villa. She made her league debut against Manchester City on 18 September 2022. Turner scored her first league goal against Manchester City on 9 December 2023, scoring in the 7th minute. On 18 June 2024, along with Jordan Nobbs, Turner's contract was extended until June 2025. She will leave Aston Villa after the end of her contract.

Her goal against Manchester City was voted Women's Super League Goal of the Season.

=== Melbourne City ===
In August 2025, Turner joined Australian club Melbourne City on a two-year contract.

== International career ==
Turner has represented England at the U-19 and U-23 levels.

== Honours ==
Stjarnan

- Women's Cup Winners (1): 2012
- Icelandic Supercup Winners (1): 2012
- Icelandic Supercup runners-up (1): 2013
- Úrvalsdeild kvenna Winners (1): 2013
- Icelandic League Cup Women A Winners (1): 2013

Everton

- FA Women's Cup runners-up (1): 2013–14
- FA WSL 2 Winners (1): 2017

Individual

- 2016–17 SSE Women's FA Cup Player of Round Four
- WSL Goal of the Month: December 2023
- WSL Goal of the Season: 2023–24
