= Jodie Brett =

English footballer (born 1996)

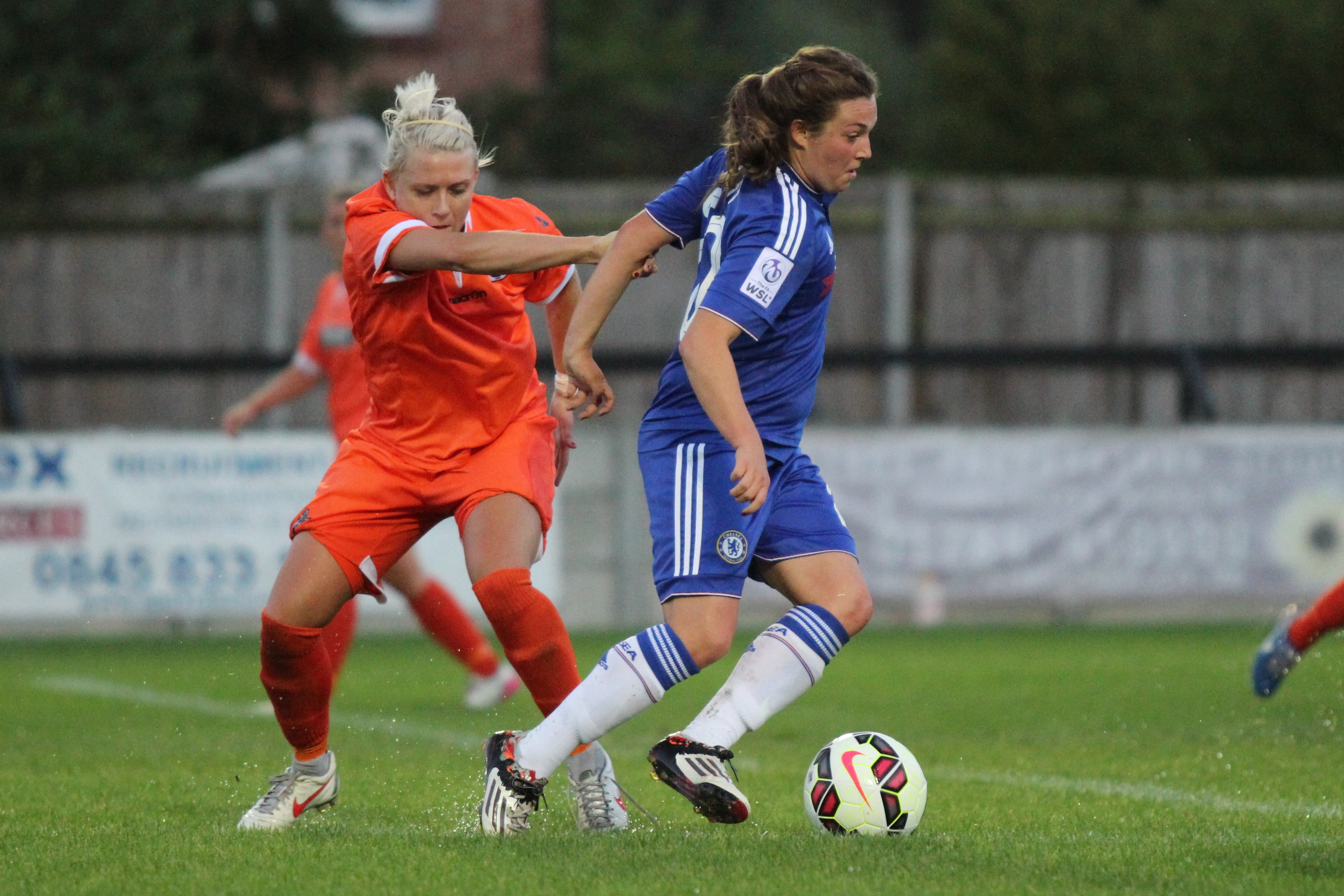

Personal information
- Full name: Jodie Leigh Brett
- Date of birth: 9 March 1996 (age 30)
- Place of birth: Portsmouth, England
- Position: Midfielder

Youth career
- Chelsea Centre Of Excellence

Senior career*
Years	Team	Apps	(Gls)
2013–2017	Chelsea	16	(2)
2016–2017	→ Bristol City (on loan)	28	(3)
2017–2018	Everton	15	(1)
2018–2021	Brighton & Hove Albion	10	(1)

International career^{‡}
2014–2015	England U-19	15	(1)
2016	England U-23	3	(0)
2016–2017	England U-23	6	(0)
- * Club domestic league appearances and goals as of 7 January 2018 ‡ National team caps and goals as of 7 January 2018

Jodie Leigh Brett (born 9 March 1996) is an English former footballer who played as a midfielder.

Brett played for Brighton & Hove Albion, and the England Under 19 team.

== Early life ==
Born in Portsmouth, Brett was introduced to football at an early age by her father, who took her to Portsmouth matches as a season ticket holder. She began playing football at a young age and spent time in both the Portsmouth and Southampton youth set-ups before moving to the Chelsea centre of excellence at the age of nine.

== Career ==
=== Chelsea ===
As a member of Chelsea Centre of Excellence Under 17's, Brett was part of the team that won the League and FA Cup in May 2012.

=== Bristol City ===
Looking for more playing time, Brett joined Bristol City on a long-term loan from Chelsea ahead of the 2016 season. Brett would register 20 appearances and scoring 3 goals contributing to Bristol's promotion to FA WSL 1. The loan-deal was subsequently extended through the 2017 Spring Series.

=== Everton ===
In July 2017, Brett transferred to Everton on a two-year deal.

=== Brighton & Hove Albion ===
On 26 July 2018, Brett was announced at Brighton & Hove Albion on a permanent transfer.

Early into the 2018–19 season, Brett suffered a severe foot injury which required specialist operative treatment. The procedure was not successful. Brett underwent subsequent remedial operations which precluded her participation in the 2019–20 and 2020–21 seasons.

On 29 May 2021, at the age of 25, Brett announced her retirement from professional football due to injury.

== International career ==
She was involved with the English selections as captain in the 2015 UEFA Women's Under-19 Championship organized in Israel. Brett was named in UEFA's team of the tournament.
