= Marthe Munsterman =

Dutch footballer (born 1993)

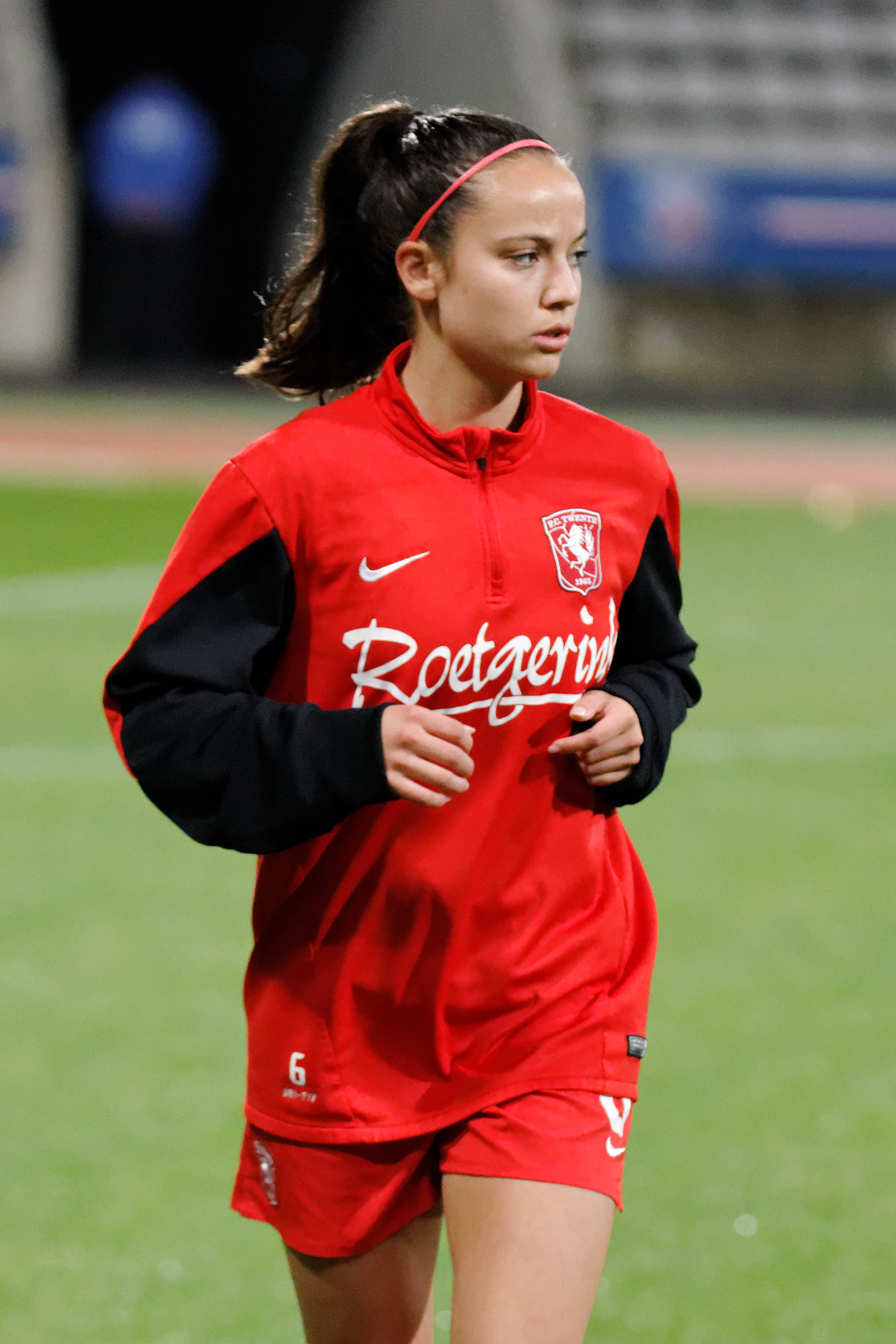
- Munsterman with Twente in 2014

Personal information
- Full name: Marthe-Emilie Munsterman
- Date of birth: 19 February 1993 (age 33)
- Place of birth: Hengelo, Netherlands
- Height: 1.65 m (5 ft 5 in)
- Position: Midfielder

Team information
- Current team: Utrecht
- Number: 6

Youth career
- ATC '65
- 2007–2011: Twente

Senior career*
| Years | Team | Apps | (Gls) |
| 2011–2017 | Twente | 132 | (5) |
| 2017–2018 | Everton | 12 | (0) |
| 2018–2023 | Ajax | 42 | (1) |
| 2023– | Utrecht | 39 | (0) |

International career^{‡}
| 2008 | Netherlands U15 | 2 | (0) |
| 2009 | Netherlands U17 | 1 | (0) |
| 2011–2012 | Netherlands U19 | 11 | (0) |
| 2015–2016 | Netherlands | 2 | (0) |
- * Club domestic league appearances and goals as of 19:56, 16 March 2025 (UTC) ‡ National team caps and goals as of 19:56, 16 March 2025 (UTC)

Marthe-Emilie Munsterman (born 19 February 1993) is a Dutch professional footballer who plays as a midfielder for Eredivisie club Utrecht. She has been capped twice by the Netherlands national team.

== Club career ==
=== FC Twente ===
Munsterman joined the youth academy of FC Twente at the formation of the club in 2007 and broke into the first team during the 2010–11 title-winning season. She is an FC Twente supporter and was proud to represent the club in UEFA Women's Champions League matches against Bayern Munich and FC Barcelona. Munsterman made her league debut against PEC Zwolle on 27 January 2011. She scored her first league goal against Royal Antwerp on 15 November 2013, scoring in the 27th minute.

She played her 100th league match for the club in March 2016.

=== Everton ===
After 10 years with FC Twente, Munsterman joined Everton in July 2017, part of a double transfer with teammate Siri Worm. She made her league debut against Liverpool on 22 September 2017.

=== Ajax ===
Munsterman made her league debut against PEC Zwolle on 7 September 2018. She scored her first league goal against Heerenveen on 11 December 2018, scoring in the 86th minute. On 11 July 2022, it was announced that Munsterman had extended her contract on a one-year deal.

=== Utrecht ===
On 22 June 2023, it was announced that Munsterman had joined Utrecht. She made her league debut against Feyenoord on 10 September 2023.

== International career ==
Munsterman won her first cap in the Netherlands' 7–0 win over Estonia on 20 May 2015, entering play as a 62nd-minute substitute for Maran van Erp.

== Personal life ==
Marthe's father Joop Munsterman was chairman of FC Twente from 2004 until 2015. In May 2011 Joop called Marthe's controversial Twitter remarks about Theo Janssen's transfer to AFC Ajax "unwise".

== Career statistics ==
=== International ===
As of match played 25 January 2016

Appearances and goals by national team and year
| National team | Year | Apps | Goals |
|---|---|---|---|
| Netherlands | 2015 | 1 | 0 |
| Netherlands | 2016 | 1 | 0 |
| Total | | 2 | 0 |

== Honours ==
=== Club ===
FC Twente

- Eredivisie (2): 2010–11, 2015–16
- BeNe League (2): 2012–13, 2013–14
- KNVB Women's Cup (1): 2014–15

Ajax

- KNVB Women's Cup (2): 2018–19, 2021–22,
