= Michelle Hinnigan =

English footballer

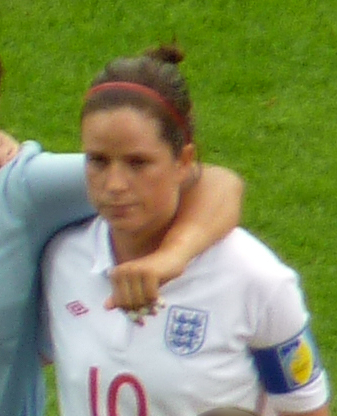

Personal information
- Date of birth: 12 June 1990 (age 36)
- Place of birth: Kirkby, England
- Position: Midfielder

Senior career*
Years	Team	Apps	(Gls)
2007–2017	Everton	55	(5)

International career^{‡}
2008–2009	England U-19	9	(0)
2010	England U-20	3	(0)
2010–2013	England U-23	15	(2)
Medal record
Women's football
Representing Great Britain
Summer Universiade
Gold medal – first place	2013 Kazan	Team
- * Club domestic league appearances and goals as of 8 June 2017 ‡ National team caps and goals as of 8 June 2017

Michelle Hinnigan (born 12 June 1990) is an English former footballer who played as a midfielder for Everton. She has represented England on the under-17, under-19, under-20 and under 23 national teams.

== Club career ==
Hinnigan joined Everton Ladies as a junior and progressed to the first team squad. Her real breakthrough came in the 2007–08 season when manager Mo Marley put Hinnigan in the first team after a number of injuries to then first-team regulars.

== International career ==
Hinnigan has represented England at Under-17, Under-19, Under-20 and Under-23 levels. In July 2009, Hinnigan captained the England Under-19 side as they beat Sweden to win the European Championship.

== Personal life ==
Hinnigan attended Loughborough University on the Talented Athlete Scholarship Scheme. Michelle attended All Saints Catholic High School in Kirkby, Liverpool.

== Honours ==
=== Everton ===
- FA Women's Premier League Cup (1): 2007–08
- FA Women's Cup (1): 2009–10
