= Courtney Sweetman-Kirk =

English footballer

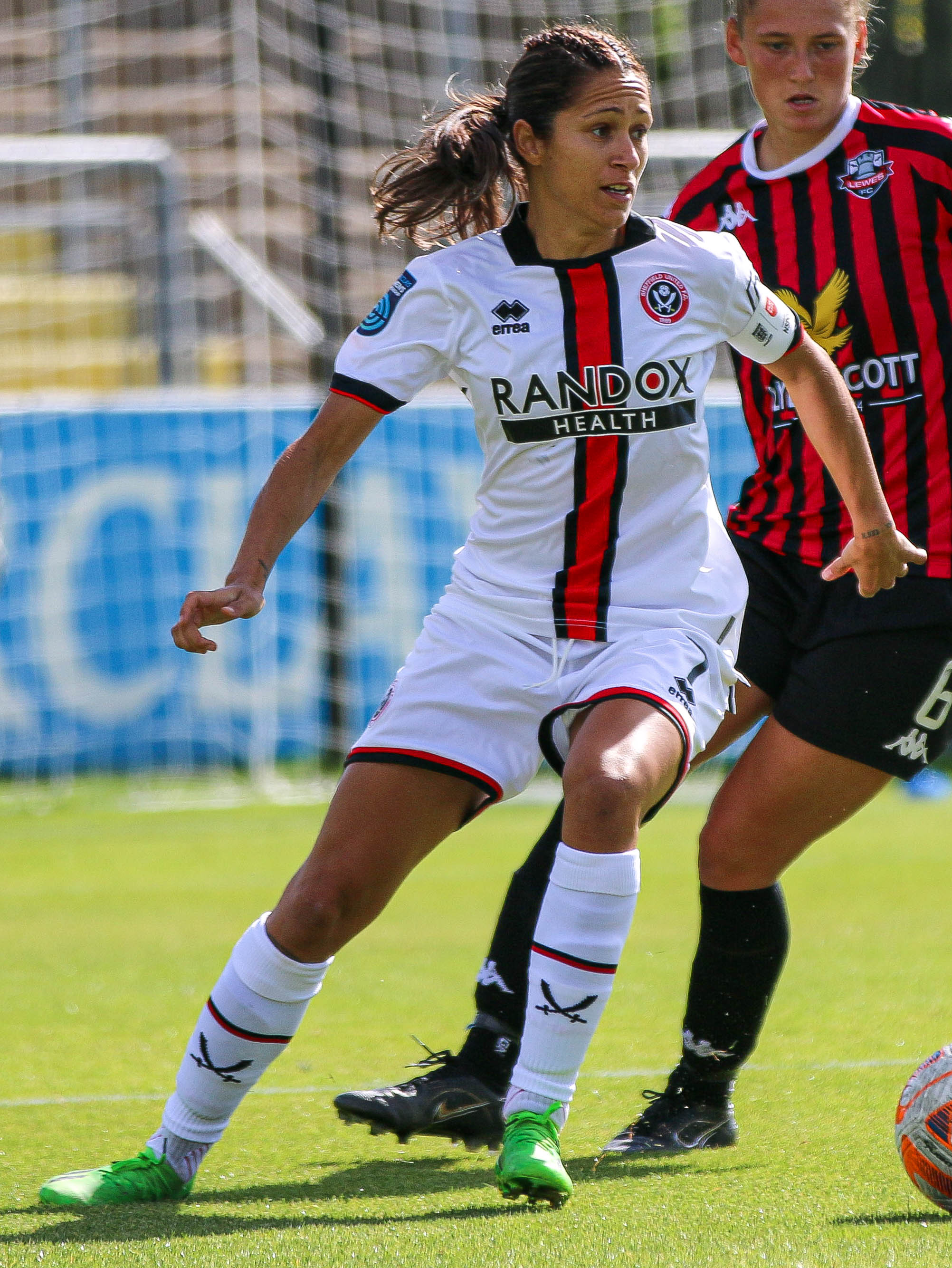
- With Sheffield United in 2022

Personal information
- Full name: Courtney Alexandra Sweetman-Kirk
- Date of birth: 16 November 1990 (age 35)
- Place of birth: Leicester, England
- Height: 1.64 m (5 ft 5 in)
- Position: Forward

Youth career
- Leicester City

Senior career*
Years	Team	Apps	(Gls)
2008–2011	Leicester City	54	(33)
2011–2013	Coventry City	35	(15)
2013–2014	Lincoln/Notts County	9	(1)
2014–2017	Doncaster Rovers Belles	43	(40)
2017–2018	Everton	18	(5)
2018–2020	Liverpool	30	(10)
2020–2023	Sheffield United	60	(25)
2026–	Kirby Muxloe	0	(0)

International career
2013	England U-23		(5)
Medal record
Women's football
Representing Great Britain
Summer Universiade
Gold medal – first place	2013 Kazan	Team
- * Club domestic league appearances and goals as of 12:22, 3 July 2023 (UTC)

Courtney Alexandra Sweetman-Kirk (born 16 November 1990) is an English football pundit and former player. She played as a forward, most recently in the FA Women's Championship. She has also previously played for Liverpool, Everton, Notts County, Lincoln, Coventry City, Leicester City and Sheffield United. She also represented England at under-23 level.

Since retiring in 2023, Sweetman-Kirk has worked as a pundit and commentator.

== Club career ==
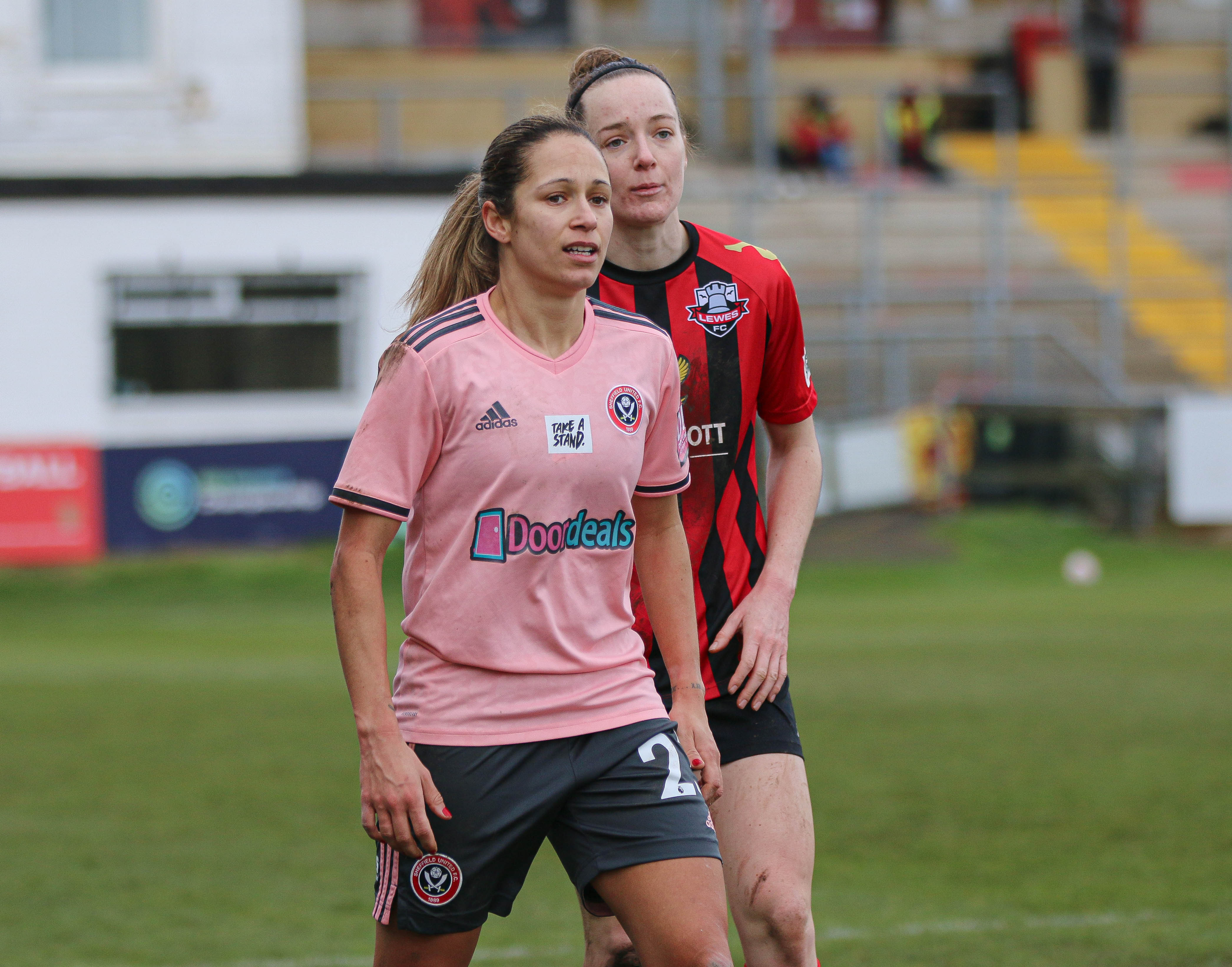
With Sheffield United in 2021

=== Lincoln / Notts County, 2013–2014 ===
Sweetman-Kirk signed with FA WSL 1 club, Lincoln Ladies in July 2013. During her first season with the club, she made seven appearances and scored one goal during a 2–0 win over Chelsea L.F.C. Notts County finished in sixth place during the regular season with a 2–8–4.

=== Doncaster Rovers Belles, 2015–2017 ===
In July 2014, Sweetman-Kirk signed with FA WSL 2 club, Doncaster Rovers Belles. She scored 20 goals in 20 matches during the 2015 FA WSL 2 season, helping lift the team to FA WSL 1 the following year. She was subsequently named FA WSL 2 Players' Player of the Year. During a match against Everton in August 2015, Sweetman-Kirk scored a hat trick after subbing in during the second half of the match when Everton was up 2–0. Her hat trick resulted in a 3–2 win.

In 2016, she signed a full-time professional contract with Doncaster, only to suffer a broken leg in a pre-season friendly. Although Doncaster were relegated in her absence, in the subsequent FA WSL Spring Series resurgent Sweetman-Kirk scored nine goals in nine games to finish as WSL 2 top goalscorer.

=== Everton, 2017–2018 ===
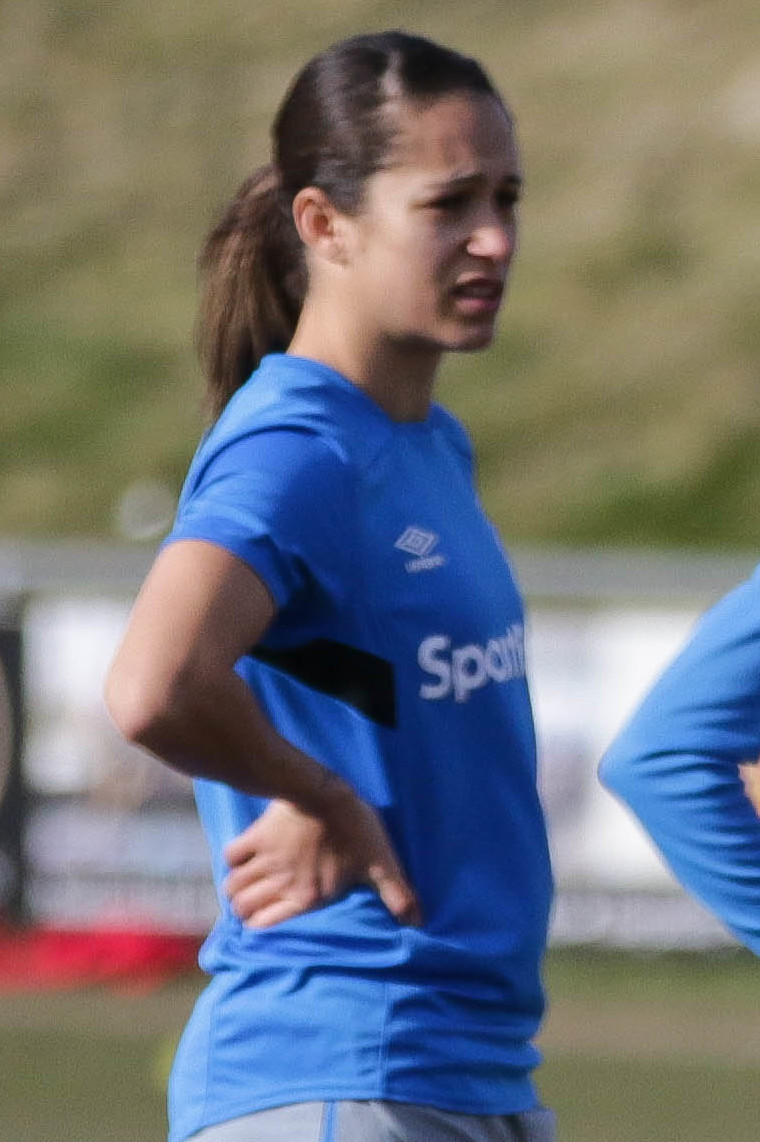
With Everton in 2018

Everton signed Sweetman-Kirk from Doncaster after their promotion to the WSL 1, on a two-year contract and paying an undisclosed fee. She was Everton's top-goalscorer in her first season with nine goals in all competitions

=== Liverpool, 2018–2020 ===
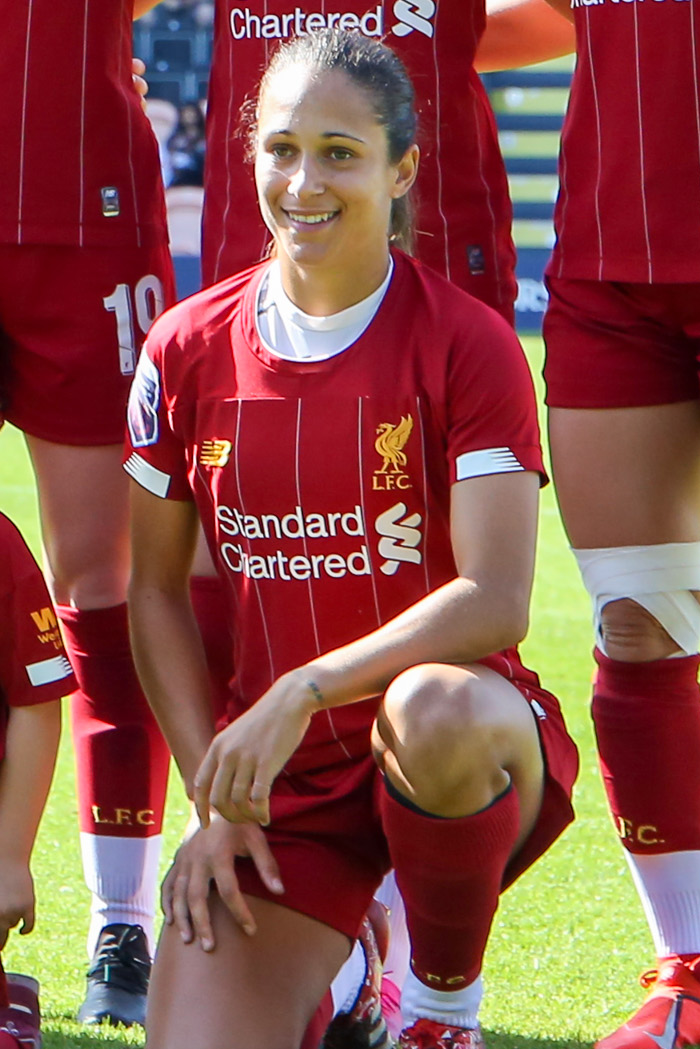
Sweetman-Kirk in 2019

Sweetman-Kirk transferred to local rivals Liverpool in July 2018. On 23 May 2020, while the league was still suspended indefinitely during the COVID-19 pandemic, Sweetman-Kirk announced she had left the club following the expiration of her contract earlier in the month.

After the 2022–23 season, Sweetman-Kirk announced her retirement from football, aged 33.

== International ==
Sweetman-Kirk made her debut for the England under-23 national team in June 2013. Her five goals during the tournament (including a hat trick against Ireland) helped Great Britain win the 2013 World University Games in Russia.

== Career statistics ==
=== Club ===
As of match played 23 May 2023

Appearances and goals by club, season and competition
Club	Season	League			FA Cup (Note: Includes the Women's FA Cup)		League Cup (Note: Includes the National League Cup, WSL Cup)		Total	
Club	Season	Division	Apps	Goals	Apps	Goals	Apps	Goals	Apps	Goals
Leicester City	2008–09	WPL Northern	12	4			3	0	15	4
Leicester City	2009–10	WPL Northern	21	14			2	1	23	15
Leicester City	2010–11	WPL Northern	21	15			3	2	24	17
Leicester City	Total		54	33	0	0	8	3	62	36
Coventry City	2011–12	WPL National	17	6			3	1	20	7
Coventry City	2012–13	WPL National	18	9			5	1	23	10
Coventry City	Total		35	15	0	0	8	2	43	17
Lincoln / Notts County	2013	WSL 1	7	1	0	0	2	1	9	2
Lincoln / Notts County	2014	WSL 1	2	0	2	0	3	0	7	0
Lincoln / Notts County	Total		9	1	2	0	5	1	16	2
Doncaster Rovers	2014	WSL 2	13	10	0	0	0	0	13	10
Doncaster Rovers	2015	WSL 2	18	20	1	0	5	5	24	25
Doncaster Rovers	2016	WSL 1	3	0	1	0	0	0	4	0
Doncaster Rovers	2017	WSL 2	9	10	1	0	0	0	10	10
Doncaster Rovers	Total		43	40	3	0	5	5	51	45
Everton	2017–18	WSL 1	18	5	2	3	5	1	25	9
Liverpool	2018–19	WSL	19	10	3	1	4	2	26	13
Liverpool	2019–20	WSL	11	0	1	0	4	1	16	1
Liverpool	Total		30	10	4	1	8	3	42	14
Sheffield United F.C.	2020-21	Women's Championship	17	5	1	0	3	0	21	5
Sheffield United F.C.	2021-22	Women's Championship	22	11	2	0	4	2	28	13
Sheffield United F.C.	2022-23	Women's Championship	21	9	1	0	4	0	26	9
Sheffield United F.C.	Total		65	25	4	0	11	2	75	27
Career total			254	129	15	4	50	17	318	151

== Honours ==
Coventry City

- Birmingham FA County Cup: 2013

Individual

- FA WSL 2 Players' Player of the Year: 2015
- FA WSL 2 Spring Series Top Goalscorer: 2015

== Punditry and commentary ==
Sweetman-Kirk has been an occasional match reporter for Soccer Saturday on Sky Sports. She also commentates on games on Amazon Prime, for E4 during the 2025 Africa Cup of Nations, and for the 2026 FIFA world feed.
