= Fern Whelan =

English footballer

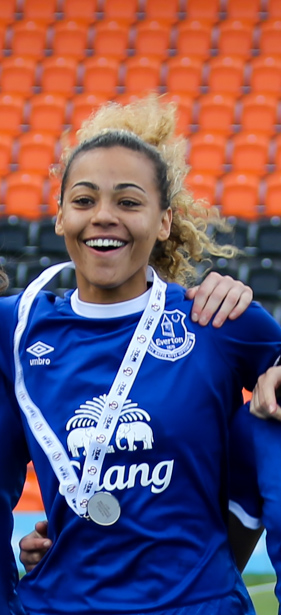
- Whelan in 2017

Personal information
- Full name: Gabriella Fern Whelan
- Date of birth: 5 December 1988 (age 37)
- Place of birth: Liverpool, England
- Position: Defender

Youth career
- Liverpool Feds

Senior career*
Years	Team	Apps	(Gls)
2004–2005	Liverpool		
2005–2014	Everton	22	(1)
2015–2017	Notts County	18	(2)
2017	Everton		
2017–2019	Brighton & Hove Albion	23	(2)

International career^{‡}
2011–2012	England	3	(0)
- * Club domestic league appearances and goals as of 12:05, 21 May 2017 (UTC) ‡ National team caps and goals as of 12:05, 21 May 2017 (UTC)

Gabriella Fern Whelan (born 5 December 1988) is an English former professional footballer who played for Brighton & Hove Albion W.F.C. She previously played for both Liverpool and Everton in her native Merseyside and Notts County. She has represented England women's national football team at youth and senior level. A quick central defender, Whelan was named the FA Women's Young Player of the Year in 2008.

== Personal life ==
Whelan attended St Pascal Baylon School in Court Hey. She was in a relationship with fellow footballer Aileen Whelan as of 2021.

== Club career ==
Whelan started playing football for her school's boys' team. Her school teacher played for Liverpool Feds and signed Whelan up to play for their junior side. She progressed to the Liverpool Ladies senior side before leaving to join Everton Ladies during the 2005 close season.

After playing in every round of the 2007–08 FA Women's Premier League Cup, Whelan missed Everton's 1–0 final win over Arsenal when she injured her cruciate ligaments in January 2008. Despite missing half the season with the injury, she was named the FA Young Player of the Year for 2007–08.

In the 2010 FA Women's Cup Final, Whelan came on as a second-half substitute for Rachel Unitt as Everton beat Arsenal 3–2 in extra time. After aggravating her previous knee injury, Whelan underwent surgery which saw her miss the entire 2012 and 2013 seasons. She declared a "brilliant feeling" in returning to the squad for 2014. Whelan was a late substitute in Everton's 2–0 2014 FA Women's Cup final defeat by Arsenal. When the 2014 season culminated in Everton's relegation, Whelan signed for Notts County on a two-year contract.

In March 2017, Whelan agreed an extension to her Notts County contract, only for the club to fold on the eve of the FA WSL Spring Series season. Instead she agreed to rejoin Everton on a free transfer. She transferred to Brighton & Hove Albion in 2017.

Whelan announced her retirement from professional football in October 2020, due to injury.

== International career ==
Whelan has represented England at Under-15, Under-19 (as captain), Under-20 and Under-23 levels. Whelan was named UEFA's "golden player" after inspiring England to the final of the 2007 UEFA Women's Under-19 Championship. She recovered from a serious knee injury to captain England at the 2008 FIFA U-20 Women's World Cup in Chile in November 2008.

National coach Hope Powell gave Whelan a first call-up to the senior England squad in October 2009, replacing Anita Asante who was withdrawn after the initial announcement of the squad. In May 2011 Whelan received another senior call-up when Fara Williams withdrew from the squad for a home friendly with Sweden. She won her first cap as a late substitute for Casey Stoney in England's 2–0 win.

Powell did not select Whelan for the 2011 FIFA Women's World Cup in Germany, but she made her first competitive appearance in England's 4–0 UEFA Women's Euro 2013 qualifying win over Slovenia at the County Ground, Swindon on 22 September 2011. At the 2012 Cyprus Cup Whelan won another cap as England beat Switzerland 1–0. During the tournament she suffered a recurrence of her cruciate ligament injury and underwent surgery which kept her out for nearly two years, causing her to miss the 2012 Olympic Games and UEFA Women's Euro 2013.

Whelan was allotted 177 when the FA announced their legacy numbers scheme to honour the 50th anniversary of England’s inaugural international.

== Post-football career ==
As well as being a professional footballer, Whelan is a qualified physiotherapist. Following her retirement from football, Whelan became an executive for equality, diversity and inclusion in women's football at the Professional Footballers' Association.
