= Claudia Mummery-Walker =

English footballer (born 1996)

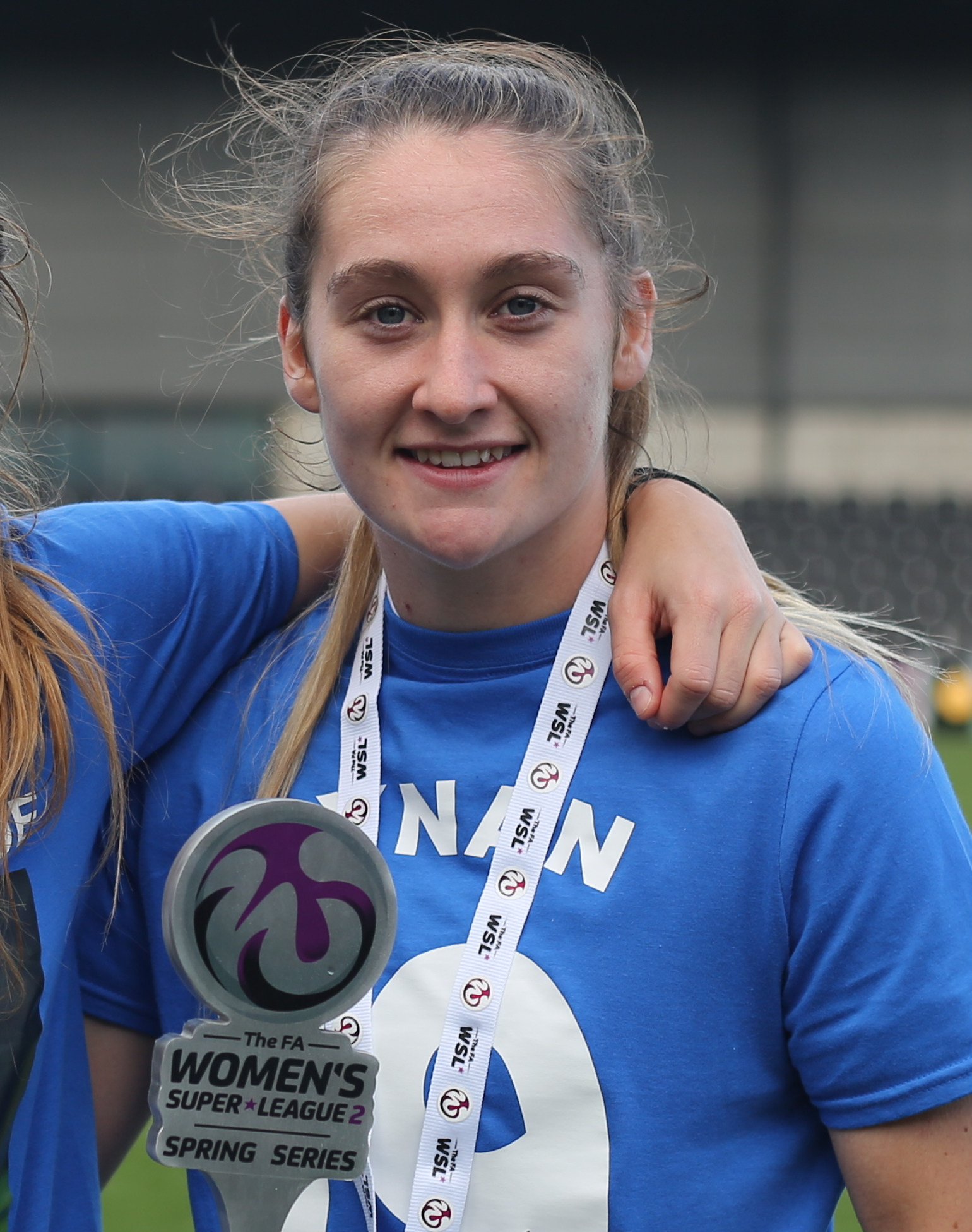
- Mummery-Walker with the FA WSL 2 Spring Series trophy in May 2017

Personal information
- Birth name: Claudia Walker
- Date of birth: 10 June 1996 (age 30)
- Place of birth: England
- Height: 1.73 m (5 ft 8 in)
- Position: Forward

Team information
- Current team: Burnley

Youth career
- Stoke City

Senior career*
Years	Team	Apps	(Gls)
2014–2015	Liverpool	6	(0)
2015–2019	Everton	54	(17)
2019	→ Birmingham City (loan)	7	(0)
2019–2021	Birmingham City	34	(5)
2021–2023	West Ham United	28	(3)
2023–2024	Birmingham City	30	(4)
2024–	Burnley	0	(0)

International career
2012–2013	England Under-17	5	(0)
2014–2015	England Under-19	9	(1)
2016–2018	England Under-23	5	(2)
- * Club domestic league appearances and goals as of 18 May 2024

Claudia Mummery-Walker (née Walker; born 10 June 1996) is an English footballer who plays as a forward for Burnley. She previously played for Birmingham City, Everton, Liverpool, Stoke City, and West Ham United. Mummery-Walker has represented England on the under-17, under-19 and under-23 national teams.

== Club career ==
=== Youth ===
Mummery-Walker spent her youth career with Stoke City eventually making a debut for the first team in 2013.

=== Liverpool FC, 2014 ===
Mummery-Walker joined Liverpool for the 2014 FA WSL season. She made two appearances during the regular season. Liverpool finished in first place with a 7–2–5 record.

=== Everton FC, 2015–19 ===
In February 2015, Mummery-Walker signed for the recently relegated Merseyside rivals, Everton of the WSL 2.

Mummery-Walker would become a regular for the Blues and played forward as striker, helping Everton with the Spring Series with seven goals in nine appearances. The Blues were promoted to WSL 1 for the 2017-18 season and signed Mummery-Walker to a 2-year full-time professional contract. In December 2017, she suffered a hamstring injury and missed the remainder for the 2017-18 season.

=== Birmingham City, 2019–2021 ===
In January 2019, Mummery-Walker went on loan to Birmingham City for the 2018–19 FA WSL season. After featuring 17 times and scoring once, she was offered a two-year contract by the club. She made the permanent switch from Everton in June 2019, signing a two-year contract.

During the 2019–20 FA WSL season, Mummery-Walker was a starting player in 10 of the 13 games she played. Birmingham City finished in 11th place with a 2–10–1 record. In June 2020, she was awarded the PFA Community Champion Award.

Returning to Birmingham City for the 2020–21 season, Mummery-Walker scored her first goal of the season during a 5–2 loss to Manchester City. She scored the game-winning goal in a 1–0 win against Reading on 11 October. Seven days later on 18 October, she scored a 50th minute "wonder goal" in a 4–0 win against Bristol City. Her fifth goal of the season was the game winner during a 1–0 over Aston Villa on 14 November.

=== West Ham United, 2021–2023 ===
On 1 July 2021, Mummery-Walker was announced at West Ham.

=== Return to Birmingham City, 2023–2024 ===
On 7 January 2023, Mummery-Walker was announced at Birmingham City. On 24 May 2024, it was announced that she would leave the club at the expiry of her contract.

=== Burnley, 2024– ===
In July 2024, following her departure from Birmingham, Mummery-Walker joined Burnley. In July 2026, she signed a new two-year contract with Burnley.

== International career ==
Mummery-Walker represented England with the under-17, under-19 and under-23 national teams. She captained the under-19 national team during the first game of the 2014 UEFA Championship, scoring the only goal for England in the tournament. In 2017, she competed with the under-23 national team at the 2017 Nordic Tournament. Mummery-Walker scored two goals in the opening match against Sweden and England would go on to win the tournament.

== Personal life ==
In October 2025, Mummery-Walker married her partner, Georgina. Since January 2026, she has been known by her married name.
