= 2021–22 Everton F.C. (women) season =

Everton
2021–22 season
- Head coach: Willie Kirk (until 16 October); Jean-Luc Vasseur (29 October – 2 February); Chris Roberts (interim, from 2 February)
- Stadium: Walton Hall Park, Liverpool
- FA WSL: 10th
- FA Cup: Quarter-final
- League Cup: Group stage
- Top goalscorer: League: Anna Anvegård (4 goals); All: Anna Anvegård (7 goals)
- Highest home attendance: 5,998 (vs. Manchester City, 4 September)
- Lowest home attendance: 242 (vs. Reading, 6 February)
- Average home league attendance: 1,021
Home colours	Away colours	Third colours

The 2021–22 Everton F.C. (women) season was the club's fifth consecutive campaign in the FA Women's Super League, the highest level of the football pyramid. Along with competing in the WSL, the club also contested two domestic cup competitions: the FA Cup and the League Cup.

After a poor start to the season, Everton sacked manager Willie Kirk on 16 October 2021. Kirk had been in charge since December 2018. Jean-Luc Vasseur, who had last been in charge of Olympique Lyon until his sacking in April 2021, was announced as his replacement on 29 October. Having taken over the team in 8th, Vasseur was sacked on 2 February after 10 games in charge with the team in 10th and eliminated from the League Cup at the group stage. Chris Roberts and Claire Ditchburn were named as interim managers.

== Squad ==
As of 31 March 2022

Note: Flags indicate national team as defined under FIFA eligibility rules; some limited exceptions apply. Players may hold more than one non-FIFA nationality.

No.	Pos.	Nation	Player
1	GK	ENG	Sandy MacIver
3	DF	ENG	Danielle Turner (captain)
4	DF	DEN	Rikke Sevecke
5	DF	SWE	Nathalie Björn
6	DF	ENG	Gabrielle George
7	MF	FRA	Kenza Dali
8	MF	ENG	Izzy Christiansen
9	FW	ENG	Toni Duggan
10	FW	NIR	Simone Magill
11	FW	SCO	Claire Emslie
14	FW	DEN	Nicoline Sørensen

No.	Pos.	Nation	Player
17	MF	SCO	Lucy Graham
18	GK	IRL	Courtney Brosnan
19	FW	SWE	Anna Anvegård
20	MF	ENG	Megan Finnigan
21	DF	GER	Leonie Maier
22	MF	ITA	Aurora Galli
26	MF	ENG	Grace Clinton
28	MF	SWE	Hanna Bennison
30	DF	ENG	Poppy Pattinson
31	DF	SCO	Kenzie Weir

== Preseason ==
31 July 2021 Friendly	Everton	2–1	(Scotland) Rangers	Halewood
15:00	Sevecke; Sørensen	Report	Ross	Stadium: Finch Farm; Attendance: Behind-closed-doors

8 August 2021 Friendly	Everton	–	Blackburn Rovers	Halewood
15:00				Stadium: Finch Farm
Note: No official scoreline released

15 August 2021 Friendly	Everton	6–1	Brighton & Hove Albion	Halewood
15:00	Finnigan; Duggan; Sørensen; Christiansen; Emslie	Report	Geum-min	Stadium: Finch Farm; Attendance: Behind-closed-doors

18 August 2021 Friendly	Sheffield United	Cancelled	Everton	Burngreave
19:00				Stadium: SUFC Academy

21 August 2021 Friendly	Aston Villa	1–3	Everton	Walsall
12:00	Petzelberger 48'	Report	Emslie 28'; Christiansen 53' (pen.); Clinton 65'	Stadium: Bescot Stadium

28 August 2021 Friendly	Hibernian (Scotland)	0–2	Everton	Riccarton
13:00			Anvegård; Dali	Stadium: Oriam

== FA Women's Super League ==
=== Results summary ===
Overall								Home						Away					
Pld	W	D	L	GF	GA	GD	Pts	W	D	L	GF	GA	GD	W	D	L	GF	GA	GD
22	5	5	12	18	41	−23	20	2	3	6	11	22	−11	3	2	6	7	19	−12

Last updated: 8 May 2022.
Source: FA WSL

=== Results by matchday ===
Round	1	2	3	4	5	6	7	8	9	10	11	12	13	14	15	16	17	18	19	20	21	22
Ground	H	A	H	A	A	H	H	A	H	A	A	H	H	A	H	H	A	A	A	H	H	A
Result	L	L	W	W	L	L	D	W	D	L	L	L	L	W	W	L	L	L	D	L	D	D
Position	12	12	9	8	8	10	10	9	9	9	10	10	11	10	9	9	9	9	10	10	10	10

A = Away; H = Home; W = Win; D = Draw; L = Loss

=== Results ===
4 September 2021 1	Everton	0–4	Manchester City	Liverpool
13:30	Björn (yellow card) 90+2'	Report	Losada 26'; Beckie 36'; Shaw 38'; Houghton 67'	Stadium: Goodison Park; Attendance: 5,998; Referee: Kirsty Dowle

12 September 2021 2	Chelsea	4–0	Everton	Kingston upon Thames
12:30	Kirby 25'; Kerr 47', 74'; Ingle (yellow card) 75'; England 79'	Report		Stadium: Kingsmeadow; Attendance: 2,379; Referee: Amy Fearn

25 September 2021 3	Everton	3–1	Birmingham City	Liverpool
11:30	Maier 13'; Bennison 73'; Sevecke 90+7'	Report	Pennock 32'	Stadium: Walton Hall Park; Attendance: 605; Referee: Helen Conley

3 October 2021 4	Reading	0–3	Everton	Reading
14:00	Woodham (yellow card) 90+1'	Report	Anvegård 2'; Emslie 38'; Turner 45+9'	Stadium: Madejski Stadium; Attendance: 740; Referee: Lucy May

10 October 2021 5	Arsenal	3–0	Everton	Borehamwood
15:00	McCabe 32'; Wubben-Moy 41'; Maanum 86'	Report		Stadium: Meadow Park; Attendance: 2,165; Referee: Helen Conley

6 November 2021 6	Everton	0–1	Brighton & Hove Albion	Liverpool
17:30	George (yellow card) 28'	Report	Whelan 61', (yellow card) 82'; Walsh (yellow card) 90+1'	Stadium: Walton Hall Park; Attendance: 502; Referee: Lucy May

14 November 2021 7	Everton	1–1	Manchester United	Liverpool
12:30	Sevecke (yellow card) 59'; Magill 76'	Report	Toone 10'; Zelem (yellow card) 60'	Stadium: Walton Hall Park; Attendance: 840; Referee: Elizabeth Simms

21 November 2021 8	Leicester City	0–1	Everton	Burton upon Trent
14:00	Sigsworth (yellow card) 80'	Report	Magill 81'	Stadium: Pirelli Stadium; Attendance: 685; Referee: Lucy May

12 December 2021 9	Everton	1–1	West Ham United	Liverpool
13:00	Duggan 76'; George (yellow card) 78'; Sevecke (yellow card) 90'	Report	Svitková (yellow card) 31'; Wyne 40'	Stadium: Walton Hall Park; Attendance: 432; Referee: Lucy May

19 December 2021 10	Tottenham Hotspur	1–0	Everton	Canons Park
14:00	Naz (yellow card) 14', (goal) 51'; Neville (yellow card) 56'	Report	Galli (yellow card) 39'; Graham (yellow card) 43'	Stadium: The Hive; Attendance: 576; Referee: Elizabeth Simms

8 January 2022	Aston Villa	P–P	Everton	Walsall
12:30				Stadium: Bescot Stadium
Note: Postponed due to a COVID-19 outbreak at Everton

16 January 2022	Everton	P–P	Chelsea	Liverpool
13:00				Stadium: Walton Hall Park
Note: Postponed due to a COVID-19 outbreak at Everton

23 January 2022 11	West Ham United	3–0	Everton	Dagenham
15:00	Svitková 41'; Brynjarsdóttir 57'; Walker 86'	Report		Stadium: Victoria Road; Attendance: 1,372; Referee: Lauren Impey

6 February 2022 12	Everton	1–2	Reading	Liverpool
13:00	Anvegård 5'; Turner (yellow card) 8'	Report	Dowie 75'; Primmer (yellow card) 84', (goal) 88'	Stadium: Walton Hall Park; Attendance: 242; Referee: Andrew Kitchen

13 February 2022 13	Everton	0–2	Aston Villa	Liverpool
13:00		Report	Gielnik 17'; Petzelberger 23'; Littlejohn (yellow card) 81'	Stadium: Walton Hall Park; Attendance: 419; Referee: Elizabeth Simms

2 March 2022 14	Aston Villa	0–1	Everton	Walsall
19:00	Mayling (yellow card) 90+4'	Report	Graham (yellow card) 11'; Galli 80'; Dali (yellow card) 90+4'	Stadium: Bescot Stadium; Attendance: 324; Referee: Robert Massey-Ellis
Note: Rescheduled from 8 January 2022

6 March 2022	Manchester City	P–P	Everton	Manchester
14:00				Stadium: Academy Stadium
Note: Postponed due to Manchester City's involvement in the 2022 FA Women's League Cup Final.

12 March 2022 15	Everton	3–2	Leicester City	Liverpool
17:30	Duggan 32'; Anvegård 40', 52'; George (yellow card) 76'	Report	Purfield 5'; Tierney 44'	Stadium: Walton Hall Park; Attendance: 574; Referee: Kirsty Dowle

16 March 2022 16	Everton	0–3	Chelsea	Liverpool
19:00		Report	Kerr 7'; Reiten 15'; Cuthbert 29'	Stadium: Walton Hall Park; Attendance: 574; Referee: James Bell
Note: Rescheduled from 16 January 2022

23 March 2022 17	Manchester City	4–0	Everton	Manchester
19:00	Magill 25' (o.g.); White 32'; Greenwood 84'; Coombs 85'	Report	George (yellow card) 51'; Turner (yellow card) 88'	Stadium: Academy Stadium; Attendance: 1,119; Referee: Scott Jackson
Note: Rescheduled from 6 March 2022

27 March 2022 18	Manchester United	3–1	Everton	Stretford
12:30	Thorisdottir (yellow card) 14'; Russo 35', 84'; Zelem 54' (pen.)	Report	Emslie 4'; George (yellow card) 49'	Stadium: Old Trafford; Attendance: 20,241; Referee: Helen Conley

1 April 2022 19	Birmingham City	0–0	Everton	Birmingham
19:00	Smith (yellow card) 42'	Report	Christiansen (yellow card) 41'	Stadium: St Andrew's; Attendance: 537; Referee: Amy Fearn

24 April 2022 20	Everton	0–3	Arsenal	Liverpool
18:45		Report	Foord 43'; Mead 67'; Nobbs 75'	Stadium: Walton Hall Park; Attendance: 583; Referee: Kirsty Dowle

1 May 2022 21	Everton	2–2	Tottenham Hotspur	Liverpool
19:30	Turner 85'; Finnigan 90+1'	Report	Ale 5'; Clemaron (yellow card) 45+3'; Green 85'	Stadium: Walton Hall Park; Attendance: 462; Referee: Lauren Impey

8 May 2022 22	Brighton & Hove Albion	1–1	Everton	Crawley
12:00	Whelan 52'	Report	Finnigan (yellow card) 17'; Björn 45+1'; Turner (yellow card) 69'	Stadium: Broadfield Stadium; Attendance: 1,371; Referee: Louise Saunders

=== League table ===
Pos	Team	Pld	W	D	L	GF	GA	GD	Pts	Qualification or relegation
8	Reading	22	7	4	11	21	40	−19	25	
9	Aston Villa	22	6	3	13	13	40	−27	21	
10	Everton	22	5	5	12	18	41	−23	20	
11	Leicester City	22	4	1	17	14	53	−39	13	
12	Birmingham City (R)	22	3	2	17	15	51	−36	11	Relegation to the Championship

Source: FA WSL
Rules for classification: 1) Points; 2) Goal difference; 3) Number of goals scored.
(R) Relegated

== Women's FA Cup ==
As a member of the first tier, Everton entered the FA Cup in the fourth round proper.

30 January 2022 Fourth round	Huddersfield Town	0–4	Everton	Huddersfield
13:00		Report	Anvegård 4'; Gauvin 38', 50'; Emslie 89'	Stadium: Kirklees Stadium

27 February 2022 Fifth round	Charlton Athletic	0–2	Everton	Bexley
13:00	Wynne (yellow card) 36'; Sulola (yellow card) 39'	Report	Dali 34'; Anvegård 74'	Stadium: The Oakwood; Attendance: 457

20 March 2022 Quarter-final	Manchester City	4–0	Everton	Manchester
12:30	Hemp 35', 48'; Weir 61'; White 90+2'	Report		Stadium: Academy Stadium; Referee: Lauren Impey

== FA Women's League Cup ==
=== Group stage ===
13 October 2021 Group stage	Manchester City	5–1	Everton	Manchester
19:00	Weir 8'; Shaw 32'; Hemp 74'; Park 79'; White 89'	Report	Clinton 10'	Stadium: Academy Stadium

3 November 2021 Group stage	Leicester City	1–3	Everton	Burton upon Trent
19:00	Plumptre 82'	Report	Anvegård 2'; Christiansen 39'; Gauvin 87'	Stadium: Pirelli Stadium

5 December 2021 Group stage	Everton	1–0	Durham	Liverpool
13:00	Maier (yellow card) 30'; Duggan 61'	Report	Hill (yellow card) 49'	Stadium: Walton Hall Park

15 December 2021 Group stage	Everton	0–2	Manchester United	Liverpool
19:00	Graham (yellow card) 19'; Björn (yellow card) 82'	Report	D. Turner 20' (o.g.); Thomas 23'	Stadium: Walton Hall Park

Pos	Team	Pld	W	WPEN	LPEN	L	GF	GA	GD	Pts	Qualification	MCI	MNU	EVE	LEI	DUR
1	Manchester City	4	3	0	0	1	14	3	+11	9	Advances to knock-out stage	—	—	5–1	—	3–0
2	Manchester United	4	2	1	1	0	8	5	+3	9	Possible knock-out stage based on ranking	2–1	—	—	2–2	—
3	Everton	4	2	0	0	2	5	8	−3	6		—	0–2	—	—	1–0
4	Leicester City	4	1	1	0	2	5	11	−6	5		0–5	—	1–3	—	—
5	Durham	4	0	0	1	3	3	8	−5	1		—	2–2	—	1–2	—

Source: thefa.com
Rules for classification: 1) Points; 2) Goal difference; 3) Number of goals scored; 4) Number of wins; 5) Head-to-head record

== Squad statistics ==
=== Appearances ===
As of 8 May 2022

Starting appearances are listed first, followed by substitute appearances after the + symbol where applicable.

No.	Pos	Nat	Player	Total		FA WSL		FA Cup		League Cup	
No.	Pos	Nat	Player	Apps	Goals	Apps	Goals	Apps	Goals	Apps	Goals
1	GK	(England) ENG	Sandy MacIver	21	0	18	0	2	0	1	0
3	DF	(England) ENG	Danielle Turner	27	2	19+2	2	3	0	2+1	0
4	DF	(Denmark) DEN	Rikke Sevecke	14	1	9+2	1	0	0	2+1	0
5	DF	(Sweden) SWE	Nathalie Björn	21	1	14+2	1	2	0	2+1	0
6	DF	(England) ENG	Gabrielle George	28	0	21	0	3	0	3+1	0
7	MF	(France) FRA	Kenza Dali	27	1	15+5	0	3	1	2+2	0
8	MF	(England) ENG	Izzy Christiansen	27	1	19+1	0	3	0	4	1
9	FW	(England) ENG	Toni Duggan	28	3	18+4	2	2+1	0	3	1
10	FW	(Northern Ireland) NIR	Simone Magill	18	2	5+9	2	0+1	0	1+2	0
11	FW	(Scotland) SCO	Claire Emslie	22	3	12+6	2	0+3	1	0+1	0
14	FW	(Denmark) DEN	Nicoline Sørensen	3	0	1+2	0	0	0	0	0
17	MF	(Scotland) SCO	Lucy Graham	22	0	10+6	0	2	0	1+3	0
18	GK	(Republic of Ireland) IRL	Courtney Brosnan	8	0	4	0	1	0	3	0
19	FW	(Sweden) SWE	Anna Anvegård	19	7	12+2	4	1+1	2	1+2	1
20	MF	(England) ENG	Megan Finnigan	22	1	12+4	1	2+1	0	2+1	0
21	DF	(Germany) GER	Leonie Maier	22	1	13+2	1	1+2	0	3+1	0
22	MF	(Italy) ITA	Aurora Galli	25	1	18	1	3	0	4	0
26	MF	(England) ENG	Grace Clinton	12	1	2+6	0	0+1	0	3	1
28	MF	(Sweden) SWE	Hanna Bennison	29	1	10+12	1	2+1	0	3+1	0
30	DF	(England) ENG	Poppy Pattinson	23	0	7+10	0	2+1	0	3	0
31	DF	(Scotland) SCO	Kenzie Weir	1	0	0	0	0+1	0	0	0
Players who appeared for the club but left during the season:
13	MF	(France) FRA	Valérie Gauvin	17	3	3+9	0	1+2	2	1+1	1

== Transfers ==
=== Transfers in ===
Date	Position	Nationality	Name	From	Ref.
1 July 2021	MF	(France)	Kenza Dali	(England) West Ham United	
9 July 2021	FW	(England)	Toni Duggan	(Spain) Atlético Madrid	
10 July 2021	FW	(Sweden)	Anna Anvegård	(Sweden) FC Rosengård	
10 July 2021	DF	(Sweden)	Nathalie Björn	(Sweden) FC Rosengård	
16 July 2021	DF	(Germany)	Leonie Maier	(England) Arsenal	
26 July 2021	GK	(Republic of Ireland)	Courtney Brosnan	(England) West Ham United	
28 July 2021	MF	(Italy)	Aurora Galli	(Italy) Juventus	
20 August 2021	GK	(Iceland)	Cecilía Rúnarsdóttir	(Sweden) KIF Örebro	
24 August 2021	MF	(Sweden)	Hanna Bennison	(Sweden) FC Rosengård	

=== Transfers out ===
Date	Position	Nationality	Name	To	Ref.
18 May 2021	DF	(Norway)	Ingrid Moe Wold	Retired	
15 June 2021	FW	(England)	Chantelle Boye-Hlorkah	(England) Aston Villa	
29 June 2021	DF	(England)	Georgia Brougham	(England) Leicester City	
29 June 2021	MF	(France)	Maéva Clemaron	(England) Tottenham Hotspur	
29 June 2021	GK	(Finland)	Tinja-Riikka Korpela	(England) Tottenham Hotspur	
29 June 2021	MF	(England)	Molly Pike	(England) Leicester City	
29 June 2021	DF	(England)	Hannah Coan	(England) Blackburn Rovers	
23 July 2021	GK	(England)	Anna Pedersen	(England) London City Lionesses	
27 July 2021	MF	(England)	Abbey-Leigh Stringer	(England) West Ham United	
30 July 2021	FW	(Wales)	Elise Hughes	(England) Charlton Athletic	
17 August 2021	FW	(Australia)	Hayley Raso	(England) Manchester City	
31 March 2022	FW	(France)	Valérie Gauvin	(United States) North Carolina Courage	

=== Loans out ===
Date	Position	Nationality	Name	To	Until	Ref.
20 August 2021	GK	(Iceland)	Cecilía Rúnarsdóttir	(Sweden) KIF Örebro	31 December 2021	
20 January 2022	GK	(Iceland)	Cecilía Rúnarsdóttir	(Germany) Bayern Munich	End of season	
