= 2020–21 Everton F.C. (women) season =

Everton
2020–21 season
- Head Coach: Willie Kirk
- Stadium: Walton Hall Park, Liverpool
- FA WSL: 5th
- FA Cup: Fifth round
- League Cup: Group stage
- Top goalscorer: League: Izzy Christiansen and Simone Magill (6); All: Izzy Christiansen (7)
Home colours	Away colours	Third colours

The 2020–21 Everton F.C. (women) season was the club's fourth consecutive campaign in the FA Women's Super League, the highest level of the football pyramid. Along with competing in the WSL, the club also contested two domestic cup competitions: the FA Cup and the League Cup.

== Squad ==
As of 28 January 2021.

Note: Flags indicate national team as defined under FIFA eligibility rules; some limited exceptions apply. Players may hold more than one non-FIFA nationality.

No.	Pos.	Nation	Player
1	GK	ENG	Sandy MacIver
2	DF	NOR	Ingrid Moe Wold
3	DF	ENG	Danielle Turner (captain)
4	DF	DEN	Rikke Sevecke
6	DF	ENG	Gabrielle George
7	FW	ENG	Chantelle Boye-Hlorkah
8	MF	ENG	Izzy Christiansen
9	FW	SUI	Alisha Lehmann (on loan from West Ham United)
10	FW	NIR	Simone Magill
11	FW	SCO	Claire Emslie
13	MF	ENG	Abbey-Leigh Stringer

No.	Pos.	Nation	Player
14	FW	DEN	Nicoline Sørensen
16	FW	AUS	Hayley Raso
17	MF	SCO	Lucy Graham
18	MF	ENG	Jill Scott (on loan from Manchester City)
19	FW	FRA	Valérie Gauvin
20	MF	ENG	Megan Finnigan
21	MF	FRA	Maéva Clemaron
23	GK	FIN	Tinja-Riikka Korpela
26	MF	ENG	Grace Clinton
30	DF	ENG	Poppy Pattinson
31	GK	ENG	Anna Pedersen

== Preseason ==
23 August 2020 Friendly	Manchester City	4–1	Everton	Manchester
	Bonner; Houghton; Hemp; Mewis	Report	Magill	Stadium: Academy Stadium; Attendance: Behind-closed-doors

26 August 2020 Friendly	Everton	5–0	Blackburn Rovers	Halewood
	Finnigan x2; Sevecke; Hughes; Clinton	Report		Stadium: Finch Farm; Attendance: Behind-closed-doors

30 August 2020 Friendly	Everton	5–0	Durham	Liverpool
	Finnigan 20'; Sørensen 33'; Christiansen 85'; Boye-Hlorkah 90', 90'	Report		Stadium: Walton Hall Park; Attendance: Behind-closed-doors

== FA Women's Super League ==
=== Results summary ===
Overall								Home						Away					
Pld	W	D	L	GF	GA	GD	Pts	W	D	L	GF	GA	GD	W	D	L	GF	GA	GD
22	9	5	8	39	30	+9	32	4	3	4	16	16	0	5	2	4	23	14	+9

Last updated: 9 May 2021.
Source: FA WSL

=== Results by matchday ===
Round	1	2	3	4	5	6	7	8	9	10	11	12	13	14	15	16	17	18	19	20	21	22
Ground	A	H	A	H	H	A	H	H	A	H	H	H	A	A	A	A	H	A	H	A	H	A
Result	W	W	W	W	D	L	D	L	L	W	L	D	D	W	L	W	L	W	W	D	L	L
Position	2	2	2	2	2	4	4	5	5	5	5	5	5	5	5	5	5	5	5	5	5	5

A = Away; H = Home; W = Win; D = Draw; L = Loss

=== Results ===
6 September 2020 1	Bristol City	0–4	Everton	Bath
14:00	Palmer (yellow card) 28'; Bryson (yellow card) 48'	Report	Magill 7'; Graham 19', 62' (pen.); Seveke (yellow card) 78'; Gauvin 90'	Stadium: Twerton Park; Attendance: Behind-closed-doors; Referee: Scott Johnson

13 September 2020 2	Everton	1–0	Tottenham Hotspur	Liverpool
13:00	Christiansen 51'; Finnigan (yellow card) 64'; Magill (yellow card) 67'; Moe Wold (yellow card) 82'	Report	Green (yellow card) 59'; Harrop (yellow card) 77'	Stadium: Walton Hall Park; Attendance: Behind-closed-doors; Referee: Robert Mason-Ellis

3 October 2020 3	Aston Villa	0–6	Everton	Walsall
12:30			Raso 21', 24'; Emslie 27', 53'; Gauvin 40'; Boye-Hlorkah 51'	Stadium: Bescot Stadium; Attendance: Behind-closed-doors; Referee: Kirsty Dowle

11 October 2020 4	Everton	3–1	West Ham United	Liverpool
13:00	Sørensen 8'; Finnigan (yellow card) 52'; Graham 71', 90+2'	Report	Dali 24'; Longhurst (yellow card) 90+4'	Stadium: Walton Hall Park; Attendance: Behind-closed-doors; Referee: Edward Duckworth

18 October 2020 5	Everton	2–2	Brighton & Hove Albion	Liverpool
13:00	Christiansen 28'; Gauvin 71'	Report	Sevecke 9' (o.g.); Le Tissier (yellow card) 45+1'; Green (yellow card) 48'; Whelan 78'	Stadium: Walton Hall Park; Attendance: Behind-closed-doors; Referee: Lucy Oliver

8 November 2020 6	Chelsea	4–0	Everton	Kingston upon Thames
14:00	Ji 18'; Bright (yellow card) 65'; England 73', 76'; Harder 90+7'	Report	Emslie (yellow card) 64'	Stadium: Kingsmeadow; Attendance: Behind-closed-doors; Referee: Abigail Byrne

14 November 2020 7	Everton	1–1	Reading	Liverpool
16:30	Magill 39'; Christiansen (yellow card) 66'	Report	Harding 42'	Stadium: Walton Hall Park; Attendance: Behind-closed-doors; Referee: Emily Heaslip

6 December 2020 8	Everton	0–3	Manchester City	Liverpool
14:30	Raso (yellow card) 29'; Clemaron (yellow card) 66'; Sørensen (yellow card) 75'	Report	White 25'; Bonner 26'; Beckie 45+2'	Stadium: Walton Hall Park; Referee: Stacey Pearson

13 December 2020	Birmingham City	P–P	Everton	Solihull
14:00				Stadium: Damson Park
Note: Postponed due to waterlogged pitch

20 December 2020 9	Arsenal	4–0	Everton	Borehamwood
12:30	Nobbs 4'; Foord 10'; Beattie 61'; Mead 63'	Report		Stadium: Meadow Park; Attendance: Behind-closed-doors; Referee: Helen Conley

10 January 2021	Everton	P–P	Manchester United	Liverpool
12:00				Stadium: Walton Hall Park
Note: Postponed due to positive COVID-19 cases in Everton squad

17 January 2021 10	Everton	4–0	Bristol City	Liverpool
13:00	Christiansen 4', 58'; Magill 38'; Finnigan 64'; Stringer (yellow card) 85'	Report		Stadium: Walton Hall Park; Attendance: Behind-closed-doors; Referee: Cristiana Hattersley

20 January 2021	Birmingham City	P–P	Everton	Solihull
19:00				Stadium: Damson Park
Note: Rescheduled from 13 December 2020 following waterlogged pitch. Postponed due to waterlogged pitch.

24 January 2021	Tottenham Hotspur	P–P	Everton	Canons Park
14:00				Stadium: The Hive
Note: Postponed due to frozen pitch and extreme weather warnings

31 January 2021 11	Everton	0–2	Manchester United	Liverpool
14:30	Scott (yellow card) 41'; Finnigan (yellow card) 88'	Report	Toone 9'; Press 42'	Stadium: Walton Hall Park; Attendance: Behind-closed-doors; Referee: Kirsty Dowle
Note: Rescheduled from 10 January 2021 following positive COVID-19 cases in Everton squad

7 February 2021 12	Everton	1–1	Birmingham City	Liverpool
14:00	Turner 22'; Scott (yellow card) 88'	Report	Napier 34'; McCarron (yellow card) 41'; Holloway (yellow card) 66'; Kelly (yellow card) 87'; Littlejohn (yellow card) 90+3'	Stadium: Walton Hall Park; Attendance: Behind-closed-doors; Referee: Lisa Benn

14 February 2021 13	Reading	1–1	Everton	Reading
14:00	Rowe 34'; Bartrip (yellow card) 90+2'	Report	Stringer (yellow card) 24'; Sørensen 77'	Stadium: Madejski Stadium; Attendance: Behind-closed-doors; Referee: Stacey Pearson

28 February 2021 14	Tottenham Hotspur	2–3	Everton	Canons Park
14:00	Harrop (yellow card) 18'; Addison 35'; Davison 57'	Report	Gauvin 8' (pen.), 18' (pen.); Stringer (yellow card) 37'; Scott 61'; Clemaron (yellow card) 66'	Stadium: The Hive; Attendance: Behind-closed-doors; Referee: Abigail Byrne
Note: Rescheduled from 24 January 2021 due to frozen pitch and extreme weather warnings

7 March 2021 15	Manchester City	1–0	Everton	Manchester
14:00	Walsh 81'	Report	Clemaron (yellow card) 80'; Pattinson (yellow card) 90'	Stadium: Academy Stadium; Attendance: Behind-closed-doors; Referee: Sarah Garratt

11 March 2021 16	Birmingham City	0–4	Everton	Burton upon Trent
19:00	H. Scott (yellow card) 82'	Report	MacIver (yellow card) 13'; J. Scott 36'; Lehmann 45'; Emslie 50'; Magill 88'	Stadium: St George's Park; Attendance: Behind-closed-doors; Referee: Lisa Benn
Note: Rescheduled from 20 January 2021 due to waterlogged pitch. Venue changed by WSL Executive Operations Committee after Damson Park was deemed not to meet requirements.

17 March 2021 17	Everton	0–3	Chelsea	Liverpool
19:00	Raso (yellow card) 49'	Report	Kirby 14'; Harder 60'; Leupolz (yellow card) 72', (goal) 79'	Stadium: Walton Hall Park; Attendance: Behind-closed-doors; Referee: Emily Heaslip

28 March 2021 18	Brighton & Hove Albion	0–5	Everton	Crawley
12:30	Kerkdijk (yellow card) 50'	Report	Christiansen 24' (pen.); Raso 25', 48', 79'; Emslie (yellow card) 38'; Magill 64'; Pattinson (yellow card) 68'	Stadium: Broadfield Stadium; Attendance: Behind-closed-doors; Referee: Cristiana Hattersley

4 April 2021 19	Everton	3–1	Aston Villa	Liverpool
13:00	Graham 36'; Christiansen 64' (pen.); Magill 78'	Report	Hutton (yellow card) 45'; Hanssen (yellow card) 67'; Ale (yellow card) 75'; Arthur (yellow card) 83', (goal) 90+4'	Stadium: Walton Hall Park; Attendance: Behind-closed-doors; Referee: Stacey Pearson

25 April 2021 20	West Ham United	0–0	Everton	Dagenham
15:00		Report	Sevecke (yellow card) 72'	Stadium: Victoria Road; Attendance: Behind-closed-doors; Referee: Helen Conley

2 May 2021 21	Everton	1–2	Arsenal	Liverpool
14:00	Finnigan 74', (yellow card) 90+4'; Christiansen (yellow card) 90+1'	Report	McCabe 22'; Miedema (yellow card) 75'; Little 90+4'	Stadium: Walton Hall Park; Attendance: Behind-closed-doors; Referee: Sarah Garratt

9 May 2021 22	Manchester United	2–0	Everton	Leigh
14:30	Toone 6'; Hanson 89'	Report	Sevecke (yellow card) 90+1'	Stadium: Leigh Sports Village; Attendance: Behind-closed-doors; Referee: Louise Saunders

=== League table ===
Pos	Team	Pld	W	D	L	GF	GA	GD	Pts	Qualification or relegation
3	Arsenal	22	15	3	4	63	15	+48	48	Qualification for the Champions League first round
4	Manchester United	22	15	2	5	44	20	+24	47	
5	Everton	22	9	5	8	39	30	+9	32	
6	Brighton & Hove Albion	22	8	3	11	21	41	−20	27	
7	Reading	22	5	9	8	25	41	−16	24	

Source: FA WSL
Rules for classification: 1) Points; 2) Goal difference; 3) Number of goals scored.

== Women's FA Cup ==
As a member of the top two tiers, Everton will enter the FA Cup in the fourth round proper. Originally scheduled to take place on 31 January 2021, it was delayed due to COVID-19 restrictions.

18 April 2021 Fourth round	Everton	2–1	Durham	Liverpool
14:00	Pattinson 51'; Sørensen 90+1'	Report	Sharpe 46'	Stadium: Walton Hall Park; Attendance: Behind-closed-doors

20 May 2021 Fifth round	Chelsea	3–0	Everton	Kingston upon Thames
19:00	Reiten 29'; Kerr 77'; Spence 86'	Report		Stadium: Kingsmeadow; Attendance: Behind-closed-doors; Referee: Kirsty Dowle

== FA Women's League Cup ==
Everton finished second in the group but did not qualify for the knockout stage as a best-placed runner up.

7 October 2020 Group stage	Manchester City	3–1	Everton	Manchester
19:00	Lavelle 51'; Walsh (yellow card) 60'; Kelly 76'; Stokes (yellow card) 89'; Park 90+2'	Report	Turner 20'	Stadium: Academy Stadium; Attendance: Behind-closed-doors; Referee: Simon Mather

4 November 2020 Group stage	Everton	P–P	Manchester United	Liverpool
19:00				Stadium: Walton Hall Park
Note: Postponed due to stadium safety concerns

18 November 2020 Group stage	Everton	1–0	Liverpool	Liverpool
19:00	Christiansen 6'	Report		Stadium: Walton Hall Park; Attendance: Behind-closed-doors

16 December 2020 Group stage	Everton	1–0	Manchester United	Liverpool
19:20	Clemaron (yellow card) 18'; Stringer (yellow card) 50'; Graham 74'	Report		Stadium: Walton Hall Park; Attendance: Behind-closed-doors; Referee: Ed Duckworth
Note: Rescheduled from 4 November 2020

Group C

Pos	Team	Pld	W	WPEN	LPEN	L	GF	GA	GD	Pts	Qualification
1	Manchester City	3	2	0	1	0	6	1	+5	7	Advanced to knock-out stage
2	Everton	3	2	0	0	1	3	3	0	6	Possible knock-out stage based on ranking
3	Liverpool	3	1	0	0	2	3	5	−2	3	
4	Manchester United	3	0	1	0	2	1	4	−3	2	

Source: thefa.com
Rules for classification: 1) Points; 2) Goal difference; 3) Number of goals scored; 4) Number of wins; 5) Head-to-head record

Ranking of second-placed teams

Pos	Grp	Team	Pld	W	WPEN	LPEN	L	GF	GA	GD	Pts	PPG	Qualification
1	A	Durham	3	2	0	1	0	12	3	+9	7	2.33	Advanced to knock-out stage
2	F	Crystal Palace	3	2	0	0	1	10	6	+4	6	2.00	Advanced to knock-out stage
3	D	Reading	3	2	0	0	1	6	3	+3	6	2.00	
4	E	Birmingham City	2	1	0	1	0	1	0	+1	4	2.00	
5	C	Everton	3	2	0	0	1	3	3	0	6	2.00	
6	B	Arsenal	3	1	1	0	1	7	6	+1	5	1.67	

Source: thefa.com

== Squad statistics ==
=== Appearances ===
As of 20 May 2021

Starting appearances are listed first, followed by substitute appearances after the + symbol where applicable.

No.	Pos	Nat	Player	Total		FA WSL		FA Cup		League Cup	
No.	Pos	Nat	Player	Apps	Goals	Apps	Goals	Apps	Goals	Apps	Goals
1	GK	(England) ENG	Sandy MacIver	21	0	18	0	2	0	1	0
2	DF	(Norway) NOR	Ingrid Moe Wold	25	0	20+1	0	1	0	2+1	0
3	DF	(England) ENG	Danielle Turner	17	2	14	1	0	0	3	1
4	DF	(Denmark) DEN	Rikke Sevecke	23	0	19+1	0	1	0	1+1	0
6	DF	(England) ENG	Gabrielle George	9	0	4+3	0	2	0	0	0
7	FW	(England) ENG	Chantelle Boye-Hlorkah	15	1	0+10	1	0+2	0	2+1	0
8	MF	(England) ENG	Izzy Christiansen	27	7	22	6	2	0	2+1	1
9	FW	(Switzerland) SUI	Alisha Lehmann	9	1	3+5	1	1	0	0	0
10	FW	(Northern Ireland) NIR	Simone Magill	18	6	7+9	6	0	0	2	0
11	FW	(Scotland) SCO	Claire Emslie	22	3	16+3	3	2	0	1	0
13	MF	(England) ENG	Abbey-Leigh Stringer	17	0	8+6	0	0	0	2+1	0
14	FW	(Denmark) DEN	Nicoline Sørensen	27	3	14+8	2	0+2	1	2+1	0
16	FW	(Australia) AUS	Hayley Raso	26	5	16+6	5	2	0	0+2	0
17	MF	(Scotland) SCO	Lucy Graham	24	6	13+6	5	1+1	0	2+1	1
18	MF	(England) ENG	Jill Scott	13	2	11	2	2	0	0	0
19	MF	(France) FRA	Valérie Gauvin	17	5	10+5	5	1	0	0+1	0
20	MF	(England) ENG	Megan Finnigan	26	2	21	2	2	0	3	0
21	MF	(France) FRA	Maéva Clémaron	11	0	6+3	0	0	0	2	0
23	GK	(Finland) FIN	Tinja-Riikka Korpela	7	0	4+1	0	0	0	2	0
26	MF	(England) ENG	Grace Clinton	9	0	2+4	0	1	0	1+1	0
30	DF	(England) ENG	Poppy Pattinson	16	1	7+4	0	2	1	1+2	0
31	GK	(England) ENG	Anna Pedersen	0	0	0	0	0	0	0	0
Players away from the club on loan:
15	MF	(England) ENG	Molly Pike	6	0	0+4	0	0	0	1+1	0
Players who appeared for the club but left during the season:
12	MF	(Spain) ESP	Damaris Egurrola	9	0	6	0	0	0	3	0

== Transfers ==
=== Transfers in ===
Date	Position	Nationality	Name	From	Ref.
7 July 2020	DF	(England)	Poppy Pattinson	(England) Bristol City	
9 July 2020	DF	(Norway)	Ingrid Moe Wold	(Spain) Madrid CFF	
14 July 2020	FW	(Denmark)	Nicoline Sørensen	(Denmark) Brøndby IF	
16 July 2020	DF	(Denmark)	Rikke Sevecke	(France) FC Fleury 91	
6 August 2020	FW	(France)	Valérie Gauvin	(France) Montpellier HSC	
1 September 2020	MF	(Spain)	Damaris Egurrola	(Spain) Athletic Bilbao	
31 December 2020	FW	(Scotland)	Claire Emslie	(United States) Orlando Pride	

=== Loans in ===
Date	Position	Nationality	Name	From	Until	Ref.
22 August 2020	FW	(Scotland)	Claire Emslie	(United States) Orlando Pride	31 December 2020	
21 January 2021	MF	(England)	Jill Scott	(England) Manchester City	End of season	
27 January 2021	FW	(Switzerland)	Alisha Lehmann	(England) West Ham United	End of season	

=== Transfers out ===
Date	Position	Nationality	Name	To	Ref.
21 May 2020	MF	(Netherlands)	Inessa Kaagman	(England) Brighton & Hove Albion	
27 May 2020	FW	(England)	Hannah Cain	(England) Leicester City	
28 May 2020	GK	(England)	Kirstie Levell	(England) Leicester City	
28 May 2020	DF	(England)	Taylor Hinds	(England) Liverpool	
19 June 2020	FW	(England)	Chloe Kelly	(England) Manchester City	
12 August 2020	MF	(England)	Emma Doyle	(England) Blackburn Rovers	
21 September 2020	DF	(Netherlands)	Kika van Es	(Netherlands) FC Twente	
20 January 2021	MF	(Spain)	Damaris Egurrola	(France) Lyon	

=== Loans out ===
Date	Position	Nationality	Name	To	Until	Ref.
4 September 2020	DF	(England)	Georgia Brougham	(England) Birmingham City	End of season	
12 September 2020	DF	(England)	Hannah Coan	(England) Sheffield United	4 November 2020	
12 September 2020	FW	(Wales)	Elise Hughes	(England) Blackburn Rovers	End of season	
24 January 2021	DF	(England)	Hannah Coan	(England) Blackburn Rovers	End of season	
28 January 2021	MF	(England)	Molly Pike	(England) Bristol City	End of season	
