= 2019 Washington Spirit season =

Washington Spirit
2019 season
- Head coach: Richie Burke
- Stadium: Maryland SoccerPlex (primary); Audi Field (secondary)
- NWSL: 5th
- Top goalscorer: League: Ashley Hatch (7); All: Ashley Hatch (7)
- Highest home attendance: 19,871 (August 24 vs Pride)
- Lowest home attendance: 2,097 (May 4 vs Reign)
- Average home league attendance: 6,138
Home colors	Away colors

The 2019 season is Washington Spirit's seventh season, competing in the National Women's Soccer League, the top division of women's soccer in the United States. The season is the first to be led by newly appointed head coach Richie Burke.

== Club ==
=== Roster ===
The first-team roster of Washington Spirit.

Note: Flags indicate national team as defined under FIFA eligibility rules; some limited exceptions apply. Players may hold more than one non-FIFA nationality.

No.	Pos.	Nation	Player
1	GK	USA	Aubrey Bledsoe
2	FW	USA	Arielle Ship
3	DF	USA	Sam Staab
4	MF	USA	Jordan DiBiasi
5	DF	USA	Megan Crosson
6	MF	AUS	Chloe Logarzo (INT)
7	MF	AUS	Amy Harrison (INT)
8	MF	USA	Megan Dougherty Howard
9	DF	USA	Tegan McGrady
10	MF	USA	Rose Lavelle (FP)
11	FW	USA	Mallory Pugh (FP)
12	MF	USA	Andi Sullivan
13	FW	USA	Bayley Feist
14	DF	USA	Paige Nielsen

No.	Pos.	Nation	Player
16	FW	USA	Tiffany McCarty
17	FW	USA	Cali Farquharson
18	DF	USA	McKenzie Berryhill
19	DF	USA	Dorian Bailey
20	FW	JAM	Cheyna Matthews
22	FW	USA	Mallory Eubanks (MAT)
23	MF	USA	Tori Huster
24	DF	USA	Carlin Hudson
28	MF	AUS	Elise Kellond-Knight (INT)
30	GK	USA	Shae Yanez
31	FW	USA	Crystal Thomas
32	FW	USA	Grace Cutler (NTR)
33	FW	USA	Ashley Hatch

- (FP) = Federation player
- (INT) = International roster player
- (MAT) = Maternity Leave
- (NTR) = National Team Replacement

=== Team management ===
As of July 9, 2019

Coaching staff
Head Coach	(England) Richie Burke
Player/Opponent Analyst	(United States) Tom Torres
High Performance Coach	(United States) Michael Minthorne
Goalkeeper Coach	(England) Ian McCaldon
Team Performance Coach	(Germany) Christian Cziommer
Reserve Team Head Coach	(United States) Kati Jo Spisak
Athletic Trainer	(United States) Julie Beveridge

== Competitions ==
=== Preseason ===
March 16, Sat Preseason	Washington Spirit	5–0	James Madison Dukes	Richmond, Virginia
19:00 EDT (UTC-04)	Hatch 7', 26'; DiBiasi 32'; Farquharson 35'; Pugh 46'	Report; Box Score		Stadium: City Stadium

March 23, Sat Preseason	Washington Spirit	1–3	FC Bordeaux	Boyds, Maryland
19:00 EDT (UTC-04)	Bornes 35' (o.g.)	Report	Lavogez 55'; Asseyi 79' (pen.), 90+1'	Stadium: Maryland Soccerplex

March 30, Sat Preseason	Washington Spirit	0–0	North Carolina Tar Heels	Leesburg, Virginia
17:00 EDT (UTC-04)	Dougherty Howard (yellow card) 70'	Report		Stadium: Evergreen Sportsplex; Attendance: 2,000

April 6, Sat Preseason	Washington Spirit	1–0	Virginia Tech Hokies	Boyds, Maryland
19:00 EDT (UTC-04)	Lohman 72' (pen.)	Report		Stadium: Maryland Soccerplex

=== Regular season ===
April 13, 2019 1	Washington Spirit	2–0	Sky Blue FC	Boyds, Maryland
19:00	Staab 59'; Crosson 90+2'	Report; Box Score		Stadium: Maryland SoccerPlex; Attendance: 2,373; Referee: Natalie Simon

April 20, 2019 2	Utah Royals FC	1–0	Washington Spirit	Sandy, Utah
21:00	Labonta 10'	Report; Box Score	Matthews (yellow card) 26'	Stadium: Rio Tinto Stadium; Attendance: 18,015; Referee: Katja Koroleva

May 4, 2019 3	Washington Spirit	0–0	Reign FC	Boyds, Maryland
19:00	Matthews (yellow card) 86'	Report	Barnes (yellow card) 89'	Stadium: Maryland SoccerPlex; Attendance: 2,097; Referee: Jasmine Peralta

May 11, 2019 5	Sky Blue FC	2–3	Washington Spirit	Piscataway, New Jersey
15:00	Rodriguez 32'; Dorsey 80'	Report; Box Score	Matthews 22', 68'; Dougherty Howard (yellow card) 22'; Nielsen (yellow card) 54'; DiBiasi 55'	Stadium: Yurcak Field; Attendance: 1,330; Referee: Tori Penso

May 18, 2019 5	Washington Spirit	3–1	Portland Thorns FC	Boyds, Maryland
19:00	Hatch 16'; Dougherty Howard (yellow card) 25'; Brynjarsdottir 47' (o.g.); DiBiasi 71'; Staab (yellow card) 87'; Logarzo (yellow card) 90+4'	Report; Box Score	Foord 67'	Stadium: Maryland SoccerPlex; Attendance: 3,049; Referee: Danielle Chesky

May 26, 2019 6	Chicago Red Stars	0–2	Washington Spirit	Bridgeview, Illinois
18:00	Johnson (yellow card) 90+3'	Report; Box Score	Nagasato 9' (o.g.) Dougherty Howard (yellow card) 16' Hatch 63'	Stadium: SeatGeek Stadium; Attendance: 3,447; Referee: Lukasz Szpala

June 1, 2019 7	Washington Spirit	2–0	Utah Royals FC	Boyds, Maryland
19:00	Hatch 23' Bailey 70'	Report; Box Score		Stadium: Maryland SoccerPlex; Attendance: 4,575; Referee: Guido Gonzalez

June 15, 2019 8	Reign FC	1–1	Washington Spirit	Tacoma, Washington
22:00	Fishlock 77'	Report; Box Score	Huster (yellow card) 55'; Sullivan 62'	Stadium: Cheney Stadium; Attendance: 3,572; Referee: Natalie Simon

June 22, 2019 9	Washington Spirit	0–0	Houston Dash	Boyds, Maryland
19:00		Report; Box Score	Nairn (yellow card) 44'; Calderon Valdez (yellow card) 73'	Stadium: Maryland SoccerPlex; Attendance: 2,367; Referee: Lorant Varga

June 29, 2019 10	Washington Spirit	1–2	North Carolina Courage	Boyds, Maryland
19:00	Harrison (yellow card) 39'; Thomas 82'	Report; Box Score	Debinha 45+4'; Pritchett 53'; Zerboni (yellow card) 90+3'	Stadium: Maryland SoccerPlex; Attendance: 3,481; Referee: Danielle Chesky

July 6, 2019 11	Orlando Pride	4–3	Washington Spirit	Orlando, Florida
19:30	Ubogagu 21'; Hill 26'; Marta 48', 78'; Pressley (yellow card) 62'	Report; Box Score	Feist 7'; Matthews 30'; Staab (yellow card) 59'; Dougherty Howard (yellow card) 73'; DiBiasi 90+4'	Stadium: Exploria Stadium; Attendance: 3,703; Referee: Greg Dopka

July 20, 2019 12	Washington Spirit	1–2	Houston Dash	Boyds, Maryland
19:00	DiBiasi 53'; Hatch (yellow card) 77'	Report	Mewis 56'; Huerta (yellow card) 70'; Brooks 72'; Nairn (yellow card) 88'	Stadium: Maryland SoccerPlex; Attendance: 5,500

July 24, 2019 13	Sky Blue FC	0–1	Washington Spirit	Piscataway, New Jersey
19:30	James (yellow card) 50'	Report	Hatch 54'; Huster (yellow card) 90+2'	Stadium: Yurcak Field; Attendance: 5,003; Referee: Jasmine Peralta

August 3, 2019 14	North Carolina Courage	1–0	Washington Spirit	Cary, North Carolina
16:00	Debinha 64'; Spetsmark (yellow card) 90+4'	Report	Nielsen (red card) 24'	Stadium: Sahlen's Stadium at WakeMed Soccer Park; Attendance: 4,393; Referee: Gustavo Solorio
Note: Rescheduled from August 2nd due to thunderstorms.

August 10, 2019 15	Washington Spirit	0–1	Chicago Red Stars	Boyds, Maryland
19:00	Sullivan (yellow card) 13'; Lavelle (yellow card) 64'	Report	Colaprico (yellow card) 46'; Nagasato 65'	Stadium: Maryland SoccerPlex; Attendance: 5,300; Referee: Katja Koroleva

August 17, 2019 16	Portland Thorns FC	3–1	Washington Spirit	Portland, Oregon
22:30	Raso 5'; Sonnett 19'; Sinclair 63'	Report	Kellond-Knight (yellow card) 58'; Sullivan 68'	Stadium: Providence Park; Attendance: 20,895; Referee: Michael Radchuk

August 21, 2019 17	Washington Spirit	0–0	Utah Royals FC	Boyds, Maryland
19:30	Kellond-Knight (yellow card) 5'	Report	Press (yellow card) 50'	Stadium: Maryland SoccerPlex; Attendance: 2,430; Referee: Guido Gonzales Jr.

August 24, 2019 18	Washington Spirit	2–1	Orlando Pride	Washington, D.C.
19:30	Nielsen (yellow card) 38'; Thomas 9'; Hatch 59'; Feist (yellow card) 90+1'	Report	Marta 31'; Emslie (yellow card) 90+1'	Stadium: Audi Field; Attendance: 19,871; Referee: Matt Franz

September 14, 2019 19	Washington Spirit	2–2	Reign FC	Washington, D.C.
19:30	Hatch 30'; Logarzo 90'	Report	Balcer 35'; Onumonu 90+2'; McNabb (yellow card) 90+7'	Stadium: Audi Field; Attendance: 17,418; Referee: Jon Freemon

September 21, 2019 20	Chicago Red Stars	3–1	Washington Spirit	Bridgeview, Illinois
20:00	Kerr 9', 49'; Nagasato 23'	Report	Nielsen (yellow card) 53'; Staab (yellow card) 62'; Daugherty Howard (yellow card) 65'; Pugh 80'	Stadium: SeatGeek Stadium; Attendance: 4,317; Referee: Mark Allatin

September 25, 2019 21	Houston Dash	0–0	Washington Spirit	Houston, Texas
20:30	Chapman (yellow card) 44'	Report	Staab (yellow card) 12'; Nielsen (yellow card) 66'	Stadium: BBVA Stadium; Attendance: 5,247; Referee: Katja Koroleva

September 28, 2019 22	Washington Spirit	2–1	North Carolina Courage	Boyds, Maryland
19:00	Huster (yellow card) 56'; Matthews (yellow card) 59'; Pugh 75'; Lavelle 85'	Report	Williams 47'; Erceg (yellow card) 86'	Stadium: Maryland SoccerPlex; Attendance: 5,200; Referee: Ismir Pekmic

October 5, 2019 23	Orlando Pride	0–3	Washington Spirit	Orlando, Florida
17:00	Emslie (yellow card) 71'	Report	Feist (yellow card) 1'; Hatch 5' (Crystal Thomas); Thomas 62'; McCarty 85'	Stadium: Orlando City Stadium; Attendance: 6,054; Referee: Tori Penso
Note: Game was rescheduled from August 31 due to Hurricane Dorian

October 12, 2019 24	Portland Thorns FC	0–0	Washington Spirit	Portland, Oregon
22:30		Report		Stadium: Providence Park; Attendance: 24,521; Referee: Farhad Dadkho

==== Regular season standings ====
Pos	Team	Pld	W	D	L	GF	GA	GD	Pts	Qualification
1	North Carolina Courage (C)	24	15	4	5	54	23	+31	49	NWSL Shield
2	Chicago Red Stars	24	14	2	8	41	28	+13	44	NWSL Playoffs
3	Portland Thorns FC	24	11	7	6	40	31	+9	40	NWSL Playoffs
4	Reign FC	24	10	8	6	27	27	0	38	NWSL Playoffs
5	Washington Spirit	24	9	7	8	30	25	+5	34	
6	Utah Royals FC	24	10	4	10	25	25	0	34	
7	Houston Dash	24	7	5	12	21	36	−15	26	
8	Sky Blue FC	24	5	5	14	20	34	−14	20	
9	Orlando Pride	24	4	4	16	24	53	−29	16	

Source: NWSL
Rules for classification: Tiebreakers
(C) Champions

===== Results summary =====
Overall								Home						Away					
Pld	W	D	L	GF	GA	GD	Pts	W	D	L	GF	GA	GD	W	D	L	GF	GA	GD
24	9	7	8	30	25	+5	34	5	4	3	15	10	+5	4	3	5	15	15	0

Last updated: October 12, 2019.
Source: NWSLsoccer.com

===== Results by round =====
Round	1	2	3	4	5	6	7	8	9	10	11	12	13	14	15	16	17	18	19	20	21	22	23	24
Ground	H	A	H	A	H	A	H	A	H	H	A	H	A	A	H	A	H	H	A	H	A	A	H	A
Result	W	L	D	W	W	W	W	D	D	L	L	L	W	L	L	L	D	W	D	L	D	W	W	D
Position	2	5	6	6	4	2	1	1	1	2	4	5	4	5	7	7	6	6	6	6	6	6	5	5

Updated to match(es) played on October 12, 2019. Source: NWSLsoccer.com
A = Away; H = Home; W = Win; D = Draw; L = Loss

== Statistics ==
=== Appearances and goals ===
As of October 12, 2019

No.	Pos	Nat	Player	Total		NWSL		Playoffs	
No.	Pos	Nat	Player	Apps	Goals	Apps	Goals	Apps	Goals
Goalkeepers:
1	GK	(United States) USA	Aubrey Bledsoe	24	0	24	0	0	0
30	GK	(United States) USA	Shae Yanez	1	0	1	0	0	0
Defenders:
3	DF	(United States) USA	Sam Staab	24	1	24	1	0	0
5	DF	(United States) USA	Megan Crosson	9	1	9	1	0	0
9	DF	(United States) USA	Tegan McGrady	6	0	6	0	0	0
14	DF	(United States) USA	Paige Nielsen	22	0	22	0	0	0
18	DF	(United States) USA	McKenzie Berryhill	3	0	3	0	0	0
19	DF	(United States) USA	Dorian Bailey	19	2	19	2	0	0
24	DF	(United States) USA	Carlin Hudson	4	0	4	0	0	0
Midfielders:
4	MF	(United States) USA	Jordan DiBiasi	22	4	22	4	0	0
6	MF	(Australia) AUS	Chloe Logarzo	15	1	15	1	0	0
7	MF	(Australia) AUS	Amy Harrison	10	0	10	0	0	0
8	MF	(United States) USA	Megan Dougherty Howard	22	0	22	0	0	0
10	MF	(United States) USA	Rose Lavelle	6	1	6	1	0	0
12	MF	(United States) USA	Andi Sullivan	23	2	23	2	0	0
16	MF	(United States) USA	Tiffany McCarty	1	1	1	1	0	0
23	MF	(United States) USA	Tori Huster	22	0	22	0	0	0
28	MF	(Australia) AUS	Elise Kellond-Knight	9	0	9	0	0	0
Forwards:
2	FW	(United States) USA	Arielle Ship	8	0	8	0	0	0
11	FW	(United States) USA	Mallory Pugh	9	2	9	2	0	0
13	FW	(United States) USA	Bayley Feist	12	1	12	1	0	0
17	FW	(United States) USA	Cali Farquharson	13	0	13	0	0	0
20	FW	(Jamaica) JAM	Cheyna Matthews	17	3	17	3	0	0
31	FW	(United States) USA	Crystal Thomas	13	3	13	3	0	0
32	FW	(United States) USA	Grace Cutler	0	0	0	0	0	0
33	FW	(United States) USA	Ashley Hatch	24	7	24	7	0	0

Italics indicates player left team midway through season.

=== Goalkeepers ===
No.	Nat	Player	National Women's Soccer League								
No.	Nat	Player	GP	GS	MIN	W	L	D	GA	GAA	CS
1	(United States)	Aubrey Bledsoe	24	24	2149	9	8	7	25	1.05	9
21	(United States)	Sammy Jo Prudhomme	0	0	0	0	0	0	0	0.00	0
30	(United States)	Shea Yanez	1	0	11	0	0	0	0	0.00	0

== Transfers ==
=== In ===
Date	Player	Number	Position	Previous club	Fee/notes
January 14, 2019	(United States) Megan Crosson	5	DF	(Lithuania) FC Gintra	Signed
February 14, 2019	(Australia) Amy Harrison	7	DF	(Australia) Sydney FC	Signed
February 28, 2019	(United States) Paige Nielsen	14	FW/DF	(Australia) Canberra United	Signed
March 4, 2019	(United States) Jordan DiBiasi	4	MF	(United States) Stanford Cardinal	Signed
March 4, 2019	(United States) Sam Staab	3	DF	(United States) Clemson Tigers	Signed
March 4, 2019	(United States) Tegan McGrady	9	DF/FW	(United States) Stanford Cardinal	Signed
March 4, 2019	(United States) Dorian Bailey	19	MF	(United States) North Carolina Tar Heels	Signed
March 4, 2019	(United States) Bayley Feist	13	MF/FW	(United States) Wake Forest Demon Deacons	Signed
April 8, 2019	(United States) Tiffany McCarty	16	FW	(Norway) Medkila IL	Signed to Supplemental Roster
April 8, 2019	(United States) McKenzie Berryhill	18	DF	(Norway) Klepp IL	Signed
April 8, 2019	(United States) Sammy Jo Prudhomme	21	GK	(United States) Houston Dash	Signed
April 8, 2019	(United States) Carlin Hudson	24	DF	(United States) North Carolina Courage	Signed to Supplemental Roster
April 8, 2019	(United States) Shae Yanez	30	GK	(United States) Tennessee Volunteers	Signed
May 23, 2019	(United States) Crystal Thomas	31	FW	(Iceland) Valur	Signed
June 13, 2019	(United States) Grace Cutler	32	FW	(United States) West Virginia Mountaineers	Signed as National Team Replacement
July 15, 2019	(Australia) Elise Kellond-Knight	28	MF	(United States) Reign FC	Traded in exchange for Sammy Jo Prudhomme

=== Out ===
Date	Player	Number	Position	New club	Fee/notes
October 17, 2018	(Argentina) Estefanía Banini	10	FW	(Spain) Levante UD	Undisclosed
November 16, 2019	(United States) Havana Solaun	9	FW	(Norway) Klepp IL	Undisclosed
January 10, 2019	(United States) Caprice Dydasco	3	DF	(United States) Sky Blue FC	Traded for 3rd and 29th overall 2019 draft picks
January 10, 2019	(Bosnia and Herzegovina) DiDi Haracic	21	GK	(United States) Sky Blue FC	Traded for 3rd and 29th overall 2019 draft picks
January 10, 2019	(Cameroon) Estelle Johnson	24	DF	(United States) Sky Blue FC	Traded for 3rd and 29th overall 2019 draft picks
January 11, 2019	(United States) Kelsey Wys	19	GK	(Iceland) UMF Selfoss	Waived
February 5, 2019	(Canada) Quinn (Note: Then known as Rebecca Quinn)	4	MF	(France) Paris FC	Undisclosed
February 19, 2019	(United States) Tiffany Weimer	88	FW	(Denmark) FC Nordsjælland	Undisclosed
February 27, 2019	(United States) Whitney Church	5	DF		Waived
March 1, 2019	(Nigeria) Francisca Ordega	14	FW	(China) Shanghai W.F.C.	Undisclosed
March 22, 2019	(United States) Taylor Smith	7	DF	(United States) Reign FC	Released
April 8, 2019	(United States) Joanna Lohman	15	MF		Retired
July 15, 2019	(United States) Sammy Jo Prudhomme	21	GK	(United States) Reign FC	Traded in exchange for Elise Kellond-Knight
September 28, 2019	(United States) Carlin Hudson	24	DF	(France) Guigamp	Released

=== Loan In ===
Date	Player	Number	Position	Parent club	Fee/notes
February 14, 2019	(Australia) Chloe Logarzo	6	MF	(Australia) Sydney FC	Season loan

=== Draft picks ===
Draft picks are not automatically signed to the team roster. Only those who are signed to a contract will be listed as transfers in. Only trades involving draft picks and executed during the 2019 NWSL College Draft will be listed in the notes.

Player	Pos	Previous club	Notes	Ref
(United States) Jordan DiBiasi	MF	(United States) Stanford Cardinal	Round 1, Pick 3 (3rd overall)	
(United States) Samantha Staab	DF	(United States) Clemson Tigers	Round 1, Pick 4 (4th overall)	
(United States) Tegan McGrady	DF/FW	(United States) Stanford Cardinal	Round 1, Pick 7 (7th overall)	
(United States) Dorian Bailey	MF	(United States) North Carolina Tar Heels	Round 1, Pick 8 (8th overall)	
(United States) Bayley Feist	FW/MF	(United States) Wake Forest Demon Deacons	Round 2, Pick 8 (17th overall)	

== Awards ==
As of October 12, 2019

=== Monthly Awards ===
==== NWSL Team of the Month ====
Month	Goalkeeper	Defenders	Midfielders	Forwards	Ref
May	(United States) Aubrey Bledsoe	(United States) Sam Staab	(United States) Jordan DiBiasi	(United States) Ashley Hatch	
June	(United States) Aubrey Bledsoe	(United States) Sam Staab	(United States) Andi Sullivan		
August	(United States) Aubrey Bledsoe				

=== NWSL Weekly Awards ===
==== NWSL Player of the Week ====
Week	Result	Player	Ref.
4	Won	(United States) Aubrey Bledsoe	
7	Won	(United States) Aubrey Bledsoe	
20	Won	(United States) Crystal Thomas	

==== NWSL Goal of the Week ====
Week	Result	Player	Ref.
1	Nominated	(United States) Megan Crosson	
5	Nominated	(United States) Cheyna Matthews	
6	Won	(United States) Jordan DiBiasi	
7	Nominated	(United States) Ashley Hatch	
8	Nominated	(United States) Ashley Hatch	
12	Nominated	(United States) Bayley Feist	
18	Nominated	(United States) Andi Sullivan	
19	Nominated	(United States) Ashley Hatch	
20	Won	(United States) Tiffany McCarty	
20	Nominated	(United States) Ashley Hatch	
20	Nominated	(United States) Crystal Thomas	
22	Nominated	(United States) Ashley Hatch	
23	Nominated	(United States) Mallory Pugh	
24	Won	(United States) Rose Lavelle	

==== NWSL Save of the Week ====
Week	Result	Player	Ref.
4	Won	(United States) Aubrey Bledsoe	
7	Won	(United States) Paige Nielsen	
8	Nominated	(United States) Aubrey Bledsoe	
9	Nominated	(United States) Aubrey Bledsoe	
12	Won	(United States) Aubrey Bledsoe	
16	Won	(United States) Aubrey Bledsoe	
18	Nominated	(United States) Aubrey Bledsoe	
19	Nominated	(United States) Aubrey Bledsoe	
20	Nominated	(United States) Shae Yanez	
24	Nominated	(United States) Paige Nielsen	
25	Nominated	(United States) Aubrey Bledsoe	
