= 2016 Big East Conference women's soccer tournament =

- Classification: Division I
- Teams: 6
- Matches: 5
- Site: Shaw Field; Washington, D.C. (Semifinals and Final)
- Champions: Georgetown (1st title)
- Winning coach: Dave Nolan (1st title)

2016 Big East Conference women's soccer standings
	Conf.						Overall
Team	W		L		T	PCT	W		L		T	PCT
Marquette ‍†‍‍^{y}	7	–	2	–	0	.778	12	–	8	–	2	.591
DePaul ‍†‍‍	7	–	2	–	0	.778	10	–	6	–	3	.605
No. 3 Georgetown ‍‍‡‍^{y}	6	–	1	–	2	.778	19	–	2	–	3	.854
St. John's ‍‍‍	5	–	2	–	2	.667	11	–	4	–	5	.675
Providence ‍‍‍	5	–	3	–	1	.611	11	–	7	–	2	.600
Butler ‍‍‍	4	–	4	–	1	.500	11	–	7	–	2	.600
Creighton ‍‍‍	4	–	5	–	0	.444	9	–	6	–	2	.588
Villanova ‍‍‍	2	–	7	–	0	.222	4	–	14	–	0	.222
Seton Hall ‍‍‍	1	–	8	–	0	.111	5	–	11	–	1	.324
Xavier ‍‍‍	1	–	8	–	0	.111	7	–	11	–	1	.395
† – Conference champion ‡ – 2016 Big East Tournament champion y – Invited to the NCAA tournament As of 2016-11-21; Rankings from NSCAA

The 2016 Big East Conference women's soccer tournament is the postseason women's soccer tournament for the Big East Conference to be held from November 1 to 6, 2016. The five-match tournament will begin with first round matches held at campus sites, before moving to Shaw Field in Washington, D.C. for the semifinals and final. The six team single-elimination tournament will consist of three rounds based on seeding from regular season conference play. The Butler Bulldogs are the defending tournament champions, after defeating the Providence Friars in the championship match, claiming their first Big East championship in any sport since joining in 2013–14.

== Bracket ==
First round Tuesday, Nov. 1
4	St. John's	1
5	Providence	0
3	Georgetown	4
6	Butler	0

Semifinals; Friday, Nov. 4
1	Marquette	2^{OT}
4	St. John's	1
2	DePaul	1 (4)
3	Georgetown	1 (5)

Final; Sunday, Nov. 6
1	Marquette	0
3	Georgetown	2

== Schedule ==
=== Quarterfinals ===
November 1, 2016	#3 Georgetown	4–0	#6 Butler	Washington, D.C.
2:00 p.m. EST	Amanda Carolan 15', 62'; Carson Nizialek 75'; Crystal Thomas 77'	Report		Stadium: Shaw Field; Referee: John Brady

November 1, 2016	#4 St. John's	1–0	#5 Providence	Queens, New York City, New York
7:00 p.m. EST	Morgan Tinari 84'	Report		Stadium: Belson Stadium; Referee: Mike McBride

=== Semifinals ===
November 4, 2016	#1 Marquette	2–1 (a.e.t.)	#4 St. John's	Washington, D.C.
11:30 a.m. EST	Carrie Madden 35', 96'	Report	Shea Connors 29'	Stadium: Shaw Field; Referee: Shaun Papperman

November 4, 2016	#2 DePaul	1–1 (a.e.t.) (4–5 p)	#3 Georgetown	Washington, D.C.
2:00 p.m. EST	Franny Cerny 18'	Report	Marina Paul 60'	Stadium: Shaw Field; Referee: Sergio Gonzalez
	Penalties
	Franny Cerny (penalty scored); Jessie Schmidt (penalty scored); Taylor Schissler (penalty scored); Avery Hay (penalty scored); Elizabeth Endy (penalty missed)		(penalty scored) Rachel Corboz; (penalty scored) Taylor Pak; (penalty scored) Meghan Shaver; (penalty scored) Carson Nizialek; (penalty scored) Crystal Thomas

=== Final ===
November 6, 2016	#1 Marquette	0–2	#3 Georgetown	Washington, D.C.
1:00 p.m. EST		Report	Grace Damaska 22'; Rachel Corboz 52'	Stadium: Shaw Field; Referee: Jason Cullum
