= Grace Clinton =

English footballer (born 2003)

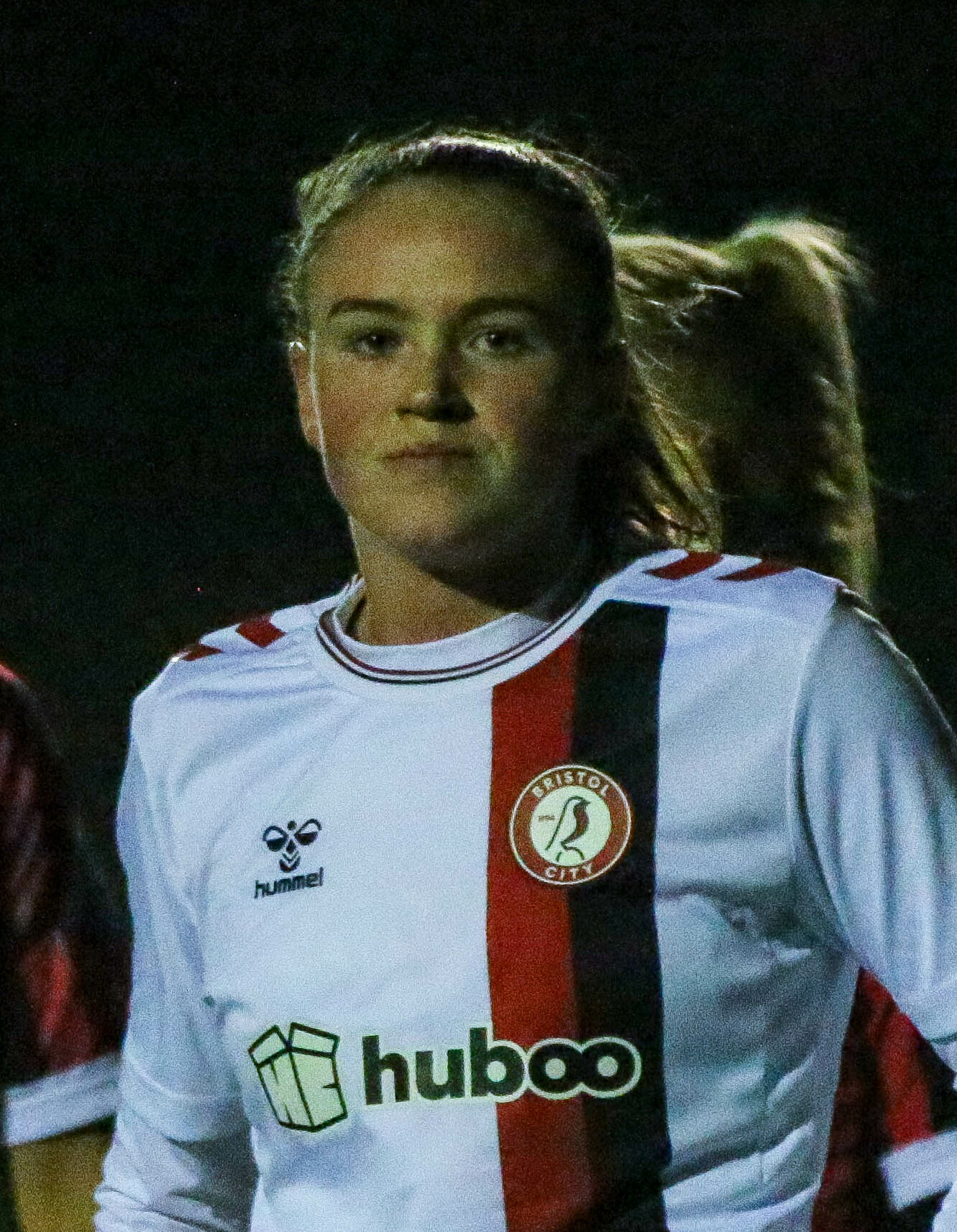
- Clinton playing for Bristol City in 2023

Personal information
- Full name: Grace Clinton
- Date of birth: 31 March 2003 (age 23)
- Place of birth: Liverpool, England
- Position: Midfielder

Team information
- Current team: Manchester City
- Number: 6

Youth career
- Everton
- Manchester United

Senior career*
Years	Team	Apps	(Gls)
2020–2022	Everton	14	(0)
2022–2025	Manchester United	21	(8)
2023	→ Bristol City (loan)	12	(6)
2023–2024	→ Tottenham Hotspur (loan)	20	(4)
2025–	Manchester City	20	(1)

International career^{‡}
2020–2021	England U17	2	(1)
2021–2022	England U19	12	(6)
2022–	England U23	6	(0)
2024–	England	17	(3)
Medal record
Women's football
Representing England
UEFA Women's Championship
Winner	2025 Switzerland
- * Club domestic league appearances and goals as of 22:45, 7 November 2026 (UTC) ‡ National team caps and goals as of 2 December 2025

Grace Clinton (born 31 March 2003) is an English professional footballer who plays as a midfielder for English Women's Super League (WSL) club Manchester City and the England national team. Clinton started her senior career at Everton before moving to Manchester United. She had loan spells at Bristol City, where she won the 2022–23 Championship title, and Tottenham Hotspur.

Clinton earned PFA Women's Young Player of the Year honors in 2024 and was named to the PFA WSL Team of the Year for the 2023–24 season. She was named Bristol City Women's Young Player of the Year for the 2022–23 season. She was part of the England squad which won UEFA Euro 2025.

== Club career ==
=== Everton ===
Clinton came through the Everton academy. In preseason ahead of the 2020–21 campaign, then-16-year-old Clinton was called up to train with the first team after manager Willie Kirk singled her out as "a really talented teenager, but she's probably our sixth-choice midfielder. She could play for every Championship team and possibly a couple of WSL teams." He did, however, note room for improvement in her game defensively, stating she was "a little bit frustrating because she was a little bit lazy out of possession" and stated the influence of experienced England international Jill Scott could have after her arrival on loan in January 2021.

In August 2020, Clinton scored during a 5–0 preseason friendly win against Championship side Blackburn Rovers. She made her competitive senior debut for the club on 3 October 2020, appearing as a 74th-minute substitute for Izzy Christiansen in a 6–0 FA WSL victory over Aston Villa.

On 1 November 2020, Clinton was named as part of the squad for the delayed 2020 Women's FA Cup Final at Wembley Stadium, where she was an unused substitute as Everton lost to Manchester City 3–1 in extra-time. She made her first start for the club on 18 November 2020 in a Merseyside derby as Everton beat Liverpool 1–0 in the 2020–21 League Cup.

=== Manchester United ===
On 15 July 2022, it was announced Clinton had signed for Manchester United on a three-year contract. United manager Marc Skinner was delighted with the signing, saying "she will bring invention, creation, and has the personality and resilience required".

==== Bristol City loan ====
On 14 January 2023, having not yet made an appearance for Manchester United, Clinton joined Women's Championship side Bristol City on loan for the remainder of the season. The next day, she scored a 93rd minute equaliser on her debut in a game that Bristol City ended up winning 3–2 against Coventry United. In her second appearance, Clinton was sent off for two yellow cards against Lewes in the 2022–23 League Cup, that City won 1–0.

On 23 April 2023, she scored the opening goal in the 4–0 win over Charlton Athletic, helping the team to win the 2022–23 Championship and promotion back to the WSL. In total, Clinton scored six goals in 15 appearances in all competitions for Bristol City, with her loan spell described as a "good stepping stone" by Skinner.

==== Tottenham Hotspur loan ====
On 14 August 2023, Clinton joined fellow WSL side Tottenham Hotspur on loan. While on loan, she completed the fourth-highest number of tackles per minutes played in the 2023–24 season, according to Talksport.

In October 2023, she scored a long range goal against Brighton & Hove Albion to take the lead in a 3–1 win. In the following game she provided an assist for Martha Thomas in a 4–2 victory over Aston Villa. On 21 January 2024, Clinton scored two goals and provided an assist in a 4–3 league win against West Ham, described as the main reason Spurs were the dominant side in the match. Thriving with a struggling Spurs side, in February 2024, BBC Sport named her a "standout performer" in the WSL. She finished the season with four goals and four assists in 20 WSL appearances. On 21 August 2024, she was named PFA Women's Young Player of the Year.

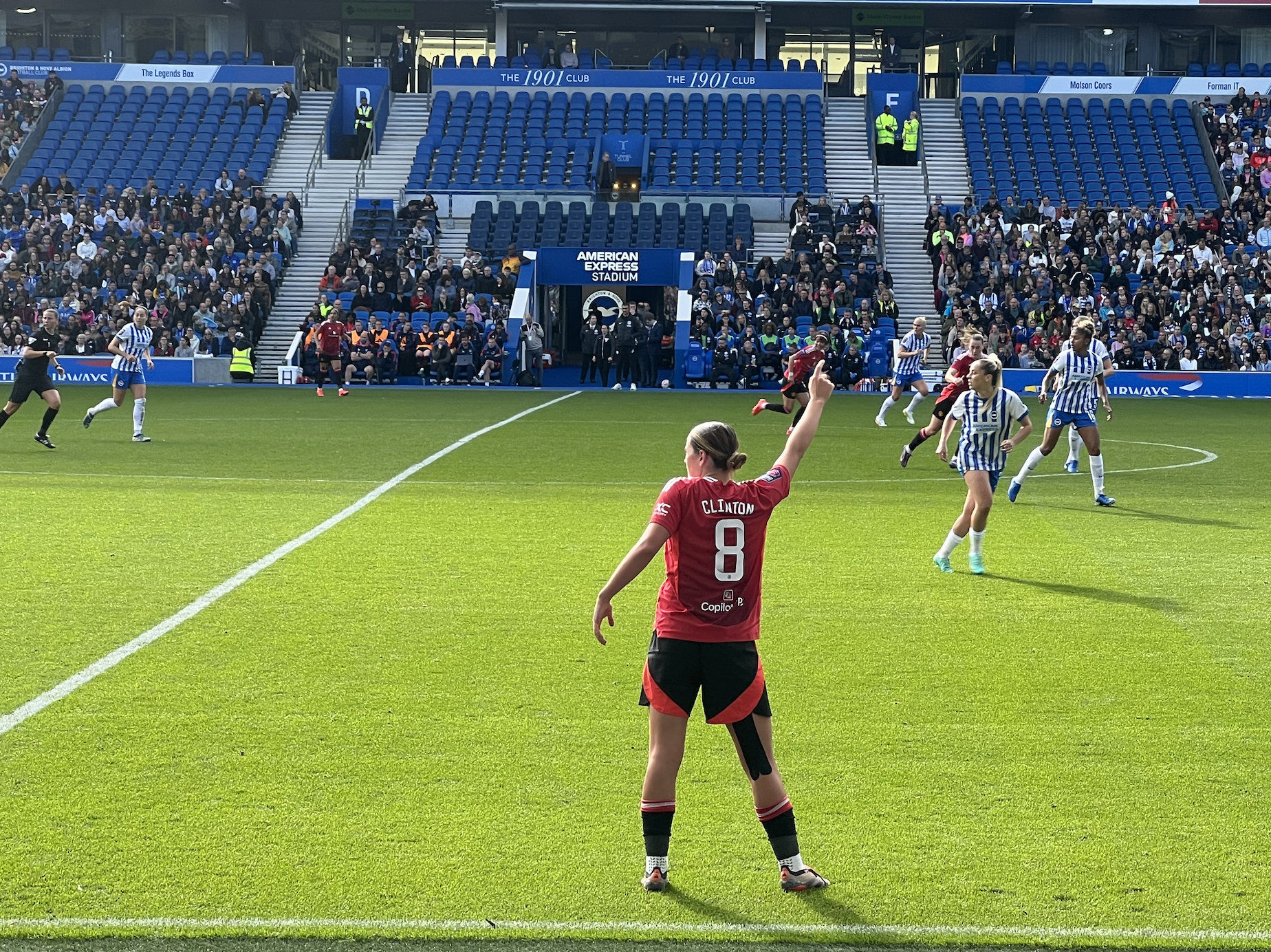
Grace Clinton with United at the Amex Stadium in October 2024.

==== 2024–25 season ====
After two loan spells away from the club, Clinton made her Manchester United debut on 21 September 2024, starting and scoring in an opening day 3–0 win at Old Trafford. On 9 January 2024, having scored 4 goals in 10 appearances during the 2024–25 season, United triggered Clinton's one-year contract extension, keeping her at the club until the summer of 2026.

=== Manchester City ===
Clinton joined Manchester City on 4 September 2025, transfer deadline day, for an undisclosed fee. Explaining her reason for leaving United, she said "I feel the future of the club and I aren't on the same page." Clinton made her debut and scored her first goal for Manchester City on 19 September in a 5–1 win against Tottenham Hotspur.

== International career ==
=== Youth ===
Clinton has played for England at under-17, under-19, and under-23 youth levels.

On 30 July 2021, with the under-19s, Clinton provided the assist for the equalising goal, as well as scored the final goal, in a 4–1 win over Czech Republic. In October 2021, in 2022 U-19 Championship qualification, Clinton scored a hat-trick against Northern Ireland in an 8–1 win, followed by the winning goal against Switzerland in a 1–0 victory, helping England to qualify for the final tournament. On 17 February 2022, in the U-19 Marbella International Tournament, Clinton scored the opening goal in a 4–0 victory over Finland. In June 2022, Clinton was named to the under-19 squad for the 2022 U-19 Championship, where she scored the final goal against Norway in an 8–1 win. She played the full 90 minutes in each group match, as England were eliminated at the group stage.

In November 2022, Clinton played for the under-23 squad in friendlies against the Netherlands and Italy. In April 2023, she played in matches against Portugal and Belgium, and was again called up for matches against Norway and Belgium in September 2023, starting both.

=== Senior ===
Clinton received her first England senior call-up in October 2023 for the UEFA Nations League matches against Belgium but did not make an appearance. She retained her place in the squad during the December window but, again, was an unused substitute for both matches. Clinton made an impressive senior debut on 23 February 2024, starting and scoring within 19 minutes in a 7–2 friendly victory over Austria.

Starting against Switzerland in a December 2024 friendly, she scored her third goal for England in five appearances. Clinton received critical acclaim for her performance as the player that dominated in the first half, and as an England star for the future by The Guardian. Clinton has been awarded Legacy number 228 by The Football Association. In June 2025, Clinton was named in England's squad for UEFA Euro 2025. On 27 July 2025, she came on in the 115th minute as a substitute in the tournament's final, helping England to beat Spain 1-1 (3-1 on penalties). The win came in her first major senior international tournament.

== Style of play ==
Clinton is a player who features in the number 10 position as an attacking midfielder, a number 8 box-to-box midfielder, or a wide player. According to Goal.com, she is able to find and exploit space, play on the half-turn, and can unravel defences with her creativity and vision.

Clinton is also known to defend when necessary, using her physicality and strength, having previously been described as a "bit lazy out of possession" by her former Everton manager Willie Kirk. Former England captain Steph Houghton stated that Clinton is a player who can "defend and be a presence in the box".

== Career statistics ==
=== Club ===
As of match played 18 November 2026

Appearances and goals by club, season and competition
Club	Season	League			FA Cup		League Cup		Europe		Total	
Club	Season	Division	Apps	Goals	Apps	Goals	Apps	Goals	Apps	Goals	Apps	Goals
Everton	2020–21	Women's Super League	6	0	1	0	2	0	—		9	0
Everton	2021–22	Women's Super League	8	0	1	0	3	1	—		12	1
Everton	Total		14	0	2	0	5	1	0	0	21	1
Manchester United	2022–23	Women's Super League	0	0	0	0	0	0	—		0	0
Manchester United	2023–24	Women's Super League	0	0	0	0	0	0	—		0	0
Manchester United	2024–25	Women's Super League	21	8	4	1	3	0	—		28	9
Manchester United	Total		21	8	4	1	3	0	0	0	28	9
Bristol City (loan)	2022–23	Championship	12	6	2	0	1	0	—		15	6
Tottenham Hotspur (loan)	2023–24	Women's Super League	20	4	3	0	4	1	—		27	5
Manchester City	2025–26	Women's Super League	12	1	4	0	4	2	—		20	3
Manchester City	2026–27	Women's Super League	8	0	0	0	—		5	1	13	1
Manchester City	Total		20	1	4	0	4	2	5	1	33	4
Career total			87	19	15	1	17	4	5	1	124	25

=== International ===
As of match played 2 December 2025

Appearances and goals by national team and year
National team	Year	Apps	Goals
England	2024	5	3
England	2025	12	0
Total		17	3

As of match played 3 December 2024

Scores and results list England's goal tally first, score column indicates score after each Clinton goal.

List of international goals scored by Grace Clinton
No.	Date	Cap	Venue	Opponent	Score	Result	Competition
1	23 February 2024	1	Estadio Nuevo Mirador, Algeciras, Spain	Austria	2–0	7–2	Friendly
2	29 October 2024	4	Coventry Arena, Coventry, England	South Africa	2–0	2–1	Friendly
3	3 December 2024	5	Bramall Lane, Sheffield, England	Switzerland	1–0	1–0	Friendly

== Honours ==
Manchester United

- Women's FA Cup runner-up: 2024–25

Bristol City

- Women's Championship: 2022–23

Tottenham Hotspur

- Women's FA Cup runner-up: 2023–24

Manchester City

- Women's Super League: 2025–26
- Women's FA Cup: 2025–26

England

- UEFA Women's Championship: 2025

Individual

- PFA Women's Young Player of the Year: 2023–24
- PFA WSL Team of the Year: 2023–24
- Bristol City Women's Young Player of the Year: 2022–23
- Barclays WSL Team of the Season: 2024-25
