= Crystal Thomas =

American soccer player (born 1994)

Personal information
- Full name: Crystal Elaine Marie Thomas
- Date of birth: January 18, 1994 (age 32)
- Place of birth: Elgin, Illinois, United States
- Height: 1.63 m (5 ft 4 in)
- Position: Forward

College career
Years	Team	Apps	(Gls)
2012–2013	Notre Dame Fighting Irish	46	(13)
2014–2016	Georgetown Hoyas	47	(19)

Senior career*
Years	Team	Apps	(Gls)
2017	Washington Spirit	1	(0)
2017	Medkila IL	10	(1)
2018	Valur	18	(5)
2019–2020	Washington Spirit	13	(3)
2019–2020	→ Perth Glory (loan)	10	(2)
2021	Orlando Pride	9	(0)
2022–2023	Hibernian	10	(4)

International career
2013	United States U20		
2017	United States U23		
- * Club domestic league appearances and goals as of May 1, 2023

Crystal Elaine Marie Thomas (born January 18, 1994) is an American former soccer player who most recently played for Hibernian in the Scottish Women's Premier League.

== Early life ==
Thomas grew up in Chicago and graduated from Wheaton Academy in West Chicago. She helped the school claim a state title in 2009 as well as three Class 2A super-sectional and sectional titles (2009–11), and four regional titles (2009–12). As a senior in 2012 she tied a school record, scoring 36 goals, and was an all-state first team selection.

Thomas played club soccer with Chicago Sockers, helping the team win a pair of Illinois State Cup titles in 2010 and 2011. She also spent time with the Olympic Development Program Region II team, captaining at both the regional and state levels.

=== College ===
Thomas began playing college soccer at the University of Notre Dame in 2012. As a freshman, Thomas appeared in all of the Fighting Irish's 24 matches including 19 starts. She scored a team-leading 10 goals as well as registering two assists as Notre Dame claimed the Big East Conference regular season title. At the end of the year she was named to the Big East All-Rookie team and was a Big East second-team selection. After two seasons with Notre Dame, Thomas transferred to Georgetown in 2014. She scored the game-winning overtime goal to beat George Washington in her Hoyas debut but then suffered a torn hamstring and was redshirted for the season. After nine months out, Thomas returned to play a further 46 games in the next two seasons, scoring 18 goals and 8 assists, and earned Big East second-team honors both years. She most notably scored the only goal in Georgetown's 1–0 NCAA quarter-final win over Santa Clara to send the Hoyas to their first ever College Cup in 2016.

== Club career ==
=== Washington Spirit ===
Thomas registered for the 2017 NWSL College Draft but was not selected. She signed a professional contract with Washington Spirit in April 2017 having spent preseason on trial with the team. She made her pro debut and only appearance of the 2017 season on April 29 as a 65th-minute substitute during a 1–0 defeat to Houston Dash. On May 19, 2017, Thomas was waived by Washington.

=== Medkila ===
In June 2017, Thomas signed with the Norwegian Toppserien team Medkila IL. She made 10 appearances during the 2017 Toppserien season, scoring one goal in a defeat to Kolbotn on October 28 as Medkila finished in last place and were relegated.

=== Valur ===
Thomas moved to Iceland to sign for Valur ahead of the 2018 Úrvalsdeild season. She played in all 18 league games, scoring five goals, and scored another two goals in three Icelandic Cup appearances.

=== Return to Washington ===
After two years in Scandinavia, Thomas returned to the NWSL and re-signed with Washington Spirit on May 23, 2019. During the 2019 season she scored three goals and was named NWSL Player of the Week for week 20 after scoring a goal and an assist in a 3–0 win away at Orlando Pride on October 5.

During the 2019–20 NWSL offseason, Thomas joined Perth Glory for the 2019–20 W-League season.

With the 2020 NWSL season disrupted by the COVID-19 pandemic, the Spirit's schedule was limited to nine games. Thomas featured in one game during the 2020 NWSL Challenge Cup and a further three games during the Fall Series, scoring once, an 88th-minute equalizer in a 1–1 tie with Chicago Red Stars on September 26. She was waived and placed on the offseason re-entry wire as part of the team's end of season roster moves in December 2020.

=== Orlando Pride ===
On February 23, 2021, after a short trial period during preseason, Thomas signed a one-year contract with Orlando Pride. She made her debut on May 1, 2021, as an 82nd-minute substitute for Sydney Leroux in a 0–0 draw with North Carolina Courage in the team's last 2021 NWSL Challenge Cup group game. Thomas' contract expired at the end of the season and she released to the waiver wire.

=== Hibernian ===
On May 4, 2022, Thomas signed with Scottish Women's Premier League team Hibernian ahead of the 2022–23 season. During a match against Heart of Midlothian in November 2022, she suffered a concussion. While preparing to return from the injury, she suffered a setback on a flight home. Thomas did not make another appearance that season and left Hibernian at the end of her contract in June 2023.

== International career ==
Thomas has been called up to training camps for both the United States under-20 and under-23 teams.

== Career statistics ==
=== Club summary ===
As of July 24, 2021.

Club	Season	League			Cup (Note: Includes the Norwegian Cup, Icelandic Cup and NWSL Challenge Cup)		Other		Total	
Club	Season	Division	Apps	Goals	Apps	Goals	Apps	Goals	Apps	Goals
Washington Spirit	2017	NWSL	1	0	—		—		1	0
Medkila IL	2017	Toppserien	10	1	0	0	—		10	1
Valur	2018	Úrvalsdeild	18	5	3	2	—		21	7
Washington Spirit	2019	NWSL	13	3	—		—		13	3
Washington Spirit	2020	NWSL	—		1	0	3 (Note: 2020 Fall Series)	1	4	1
Washington Spirit	Total		13	3	1	0	3	1	17	4
Perth Glory (loan)	2019–20	W-League	10	2	—		—		10	2
Orlando Pride	2021	NWSL	9	0	1	0	—		10	0
Hibernian	2022	SWPL	13	8					13	8
Career total			74	19	5	2	3	1	82	22

== Honors ==
Notre Dame Fighting Irish

- Big East regular season: 2012

Georgetown Hoyas

- Big East Tournament: 2016
