= Sandy MacIver =

English-Scottish footballer (born 1998)

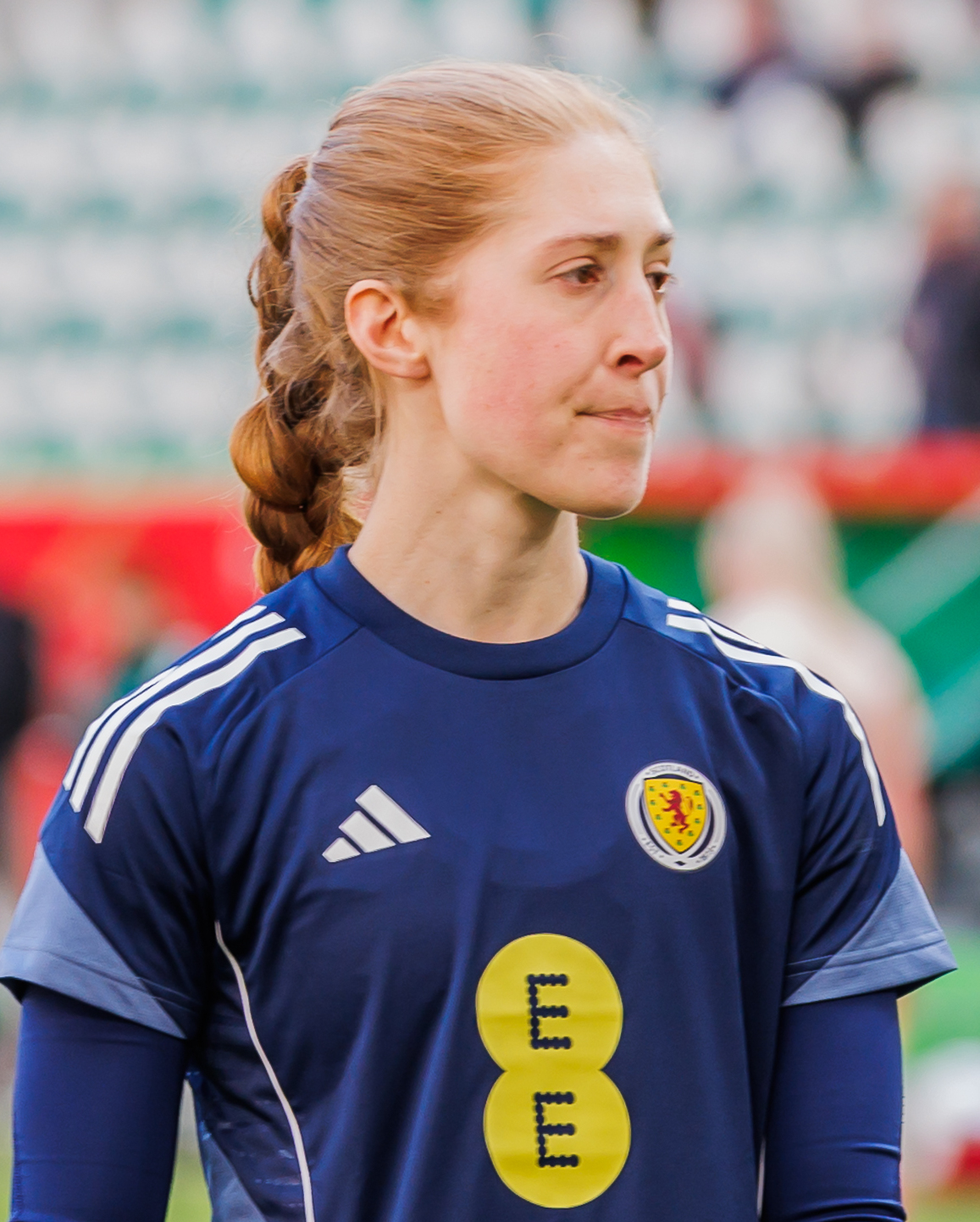
- MacIver warming up with Scotland, 2025

Personal information
- Full name: Alexandra Elena MacIver
- Date of birth: 18 June 1998 (age 28)
- Place of birth: Winsford, Cheshire, England
- Height: 1.75 m (5 ft 9 in)
- Position: Goalkeeper

Team information
- Current team: Washington Spirit
- Number: 18

Youth career
- –2015: Everton
- 2015–2016: Manchester City

College career
Years	Team	Apps	(Gls)
2016–2019	Clemson Tigers	55	(0)

Senior career*
Years	Team	Apps	(Gls)
2020–2022	Everton	39	(0)
2022–2025	Manchester City	3	(0)
2025–	Washington Spirit	32	(0)

International career^{‡}
2014–2015	England U17	4	(0)
2016–2017	England U19	6	(0)
2018	England U20	7	(0)
2019	England U21	1	(0)
2021	England	1	(0)
2023–	Scotland	14	(0)
Medal record
Women's football
Representing England
FIFA U-20 Women's World Cup
Third place	2018 France
- * Club domestic league appearances and goals as of 05:27, 15 November 2026 (UTC) ‡ National team caps and goals as of 15 October 2026

Alexandra Elena MacIver (born 18 June 1998) is a professional footballer who plays as a goalkeeper for National Women's Soccer League (NWSL) club Washington Spirit. Born in England, she plays for the Scotland national team. She has previously played for Everton and Manchester City and played college soccer for the Clemson Tigers. MacIver represented England once (in 2021) before changing her international allegiance to Scotland in 2023.

== Club career ==
=== Youth career ===
MacIver began her youth career at Everton. On 1 June 2014, she appeared as a substitute in the FA Girls' Youth Cup final against Liverpool held at Stadium MK. Everton lost 1–0. In 2015, she moved to the academy at Manchester City.

=== Clemson ===
In 2016, MacIver moved to the United States on a soccer scholarship to play for Clemson Tigers of the ACC. She made four appearances in her freshman year. From her sophomore year onward she was Clemson's starter, starting 17 games in each of the following three seasons. On 19 October 2019 she registered her first career assist, in a game against Syracuse.

=== Everton ===
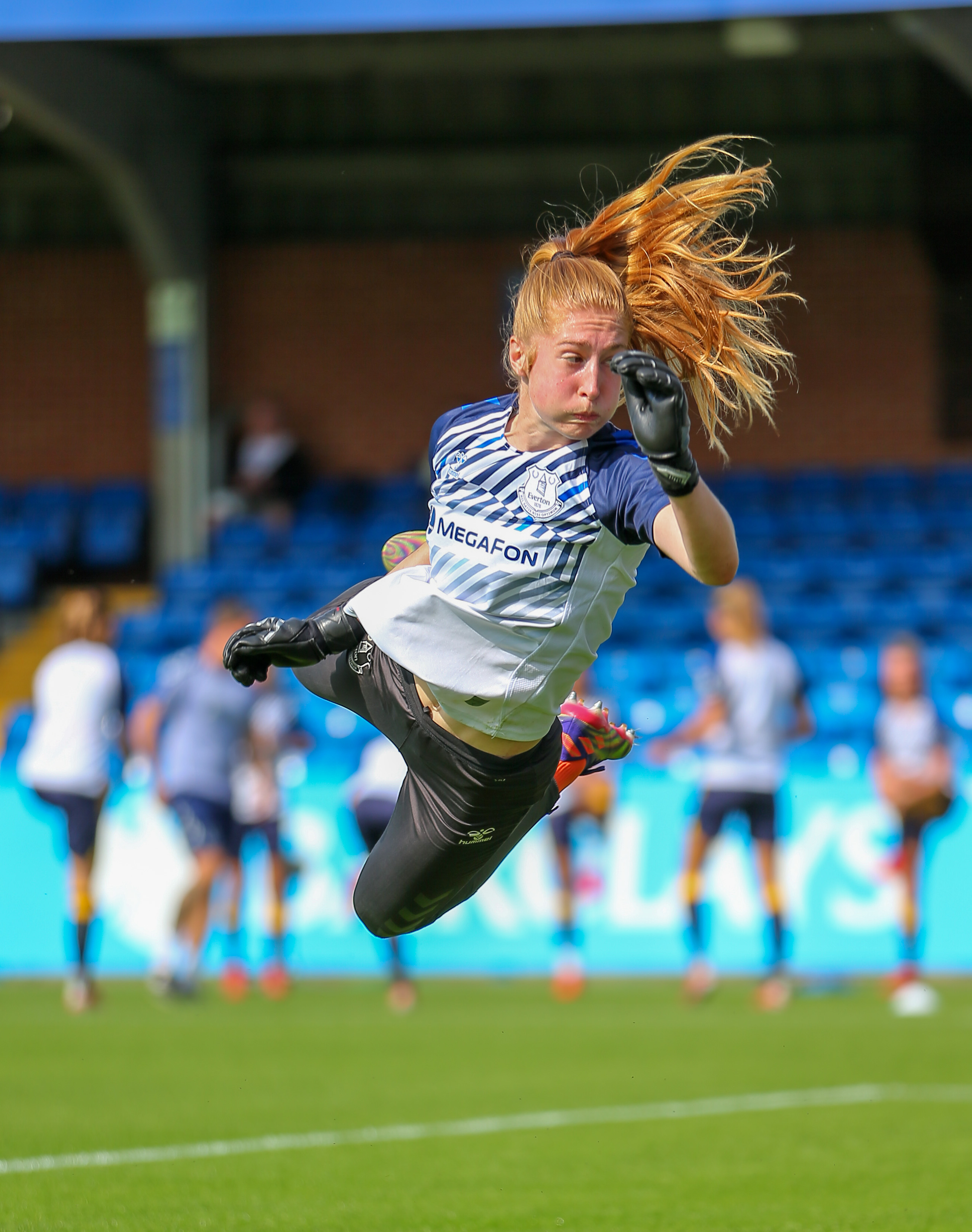
MacIver diving during the Chelsea v Everton match on 12 September 2021

On 2 January 2020, MacIver rejoined Everton after graduating from Clemson. She made her professional debut on 19 January 2020 in a 3–1 league win over Reading. On 1 November 2020, MacIver won the player of the match award in the 2020 Women's FA Cup Final, despite Everton losing 3–1 after extra time to her former club Manchester City.

=== Manchester City ===
On 2 July 2022, Manchester City announced the signing of MacIver on a three-year contract for an undisclosed fee. She made only three league appearances in her first season, with Ellie Roebuck the regular starter, and none in her second campaign as Khiara Keating became the preferred first choice; MacIver then suffered a serious knee injury in April 2024 while on international duty.

=== Washington Spirit ===
On 20 January 2025, Washington Spirit announced the signing of MacIver on a three-year contract with an option for 2028. MacIver made her debut for the Spirit in a 4–3 loss to Angel City on 2 May 2025, with Spirit assistant coach Adrián González praising her performances in training.

Aubrey Kingsbury's maternity leave created an opening for the starting job in the 2026 season. MacIver was the opening day starter for the Spirit in a 1–0 loss to the Portland Thorns on 13 March 2026. She subsequently set a Spirit record with four consecutive regular-season clean sheets, going 366 minutes without conceding a goal.

== International career ==
=== England youth ===
MacIver represented England at under-17, under-19, under-20 and under-21 level. She started every game for England at the 2015 UEFA Women's Under-17 Championship; however, England were knocked out at the group stage. She also started every game at the 2017 UEFA Women's Under-19 Championship where England finished in fifth place. MacIver was part of the England squad that won bronze medal in the 2018 U20 World Cup in France, and was awarded the Golden Glove as the tournament's best goalkeeper.

=== England senior ===
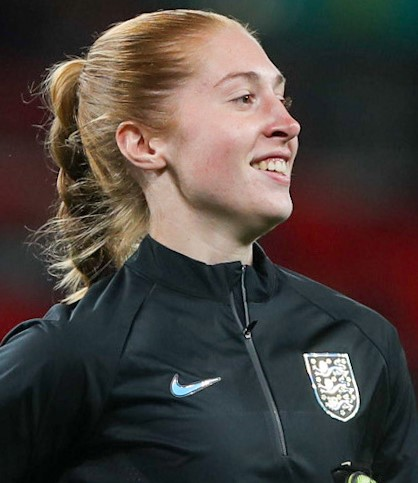
MacIver with England in 2022

In February 2019, MacIver was named as part of the England senior team's travelling party during the 2019 SheBelieves Cup and trained with the team during the tournament but was not part of the playing squad. In August 2019, MacIver received her first senior England call up for friendlies against Belgium and Norway but did not make an appearance. She was left out the next two camps but returned as part of the 2020 SheBelieves Cup squad in February 2020 following a return to England with FA WSL club Everton. She made her senior international debut on 23 February 2021 as a 61st minute substitute in a 6–0 friendly win over Northern Ireland. MacIver was given number 218 when the FA announced their legacy numbers scheme to honour the 50th anniversary of England’s inaugural international.

In May 2023, MacIver said that she had made herself unavailable for selection by England.

=== Team GB ===
On 27 May 2021, it was announced that MacIver had been selected as one of four reserve players for the Great Britain women's Olympic football team for the delayed 2020 Olympics, the third choice goalkeeper behind Ellie Roebuck and Karen Bardsley. Despite Bardsley being forced to withdraw a month prior to the tournament, MacIver remained a reserve player and Hege Riise called-up the previously unnamed Carly Telford as a replacement instead. On 1 July 2021, the IOC and FIFA confirmed squads would be expanded from 18 to 22 meaning MacIver would be available for selection to the matchday squad. She was included as an unused substitute for one match, a 1–1 group stage draw with Canada.

=== Scotland ===
MacIver remained eligible to play for Scotland, where her father was born, as she had only played in one friendly match for England (her mother was born in France). It was reported by The Scotsman in October 2023 that she had changed her international allegiance to Scotland, and later that month she was named in the squad for the first time. She made her Scotland debut on 31 October in a 1–0 UEFA Nations League defeat to the Netherlands.

On 5 April 2024, MacIver suffered an anterior cruciate ligament injury during a UEFA Euro 2025 qualification match against Serbia.

== Personal life ==
On 29 May 2012, MacIver was a torch carrier during the 2012 Summer Olympics torch relay as it was taken through Chester.

== Career statistics ==
=== Club ===
As of match played 11 February 2024.

Appearances and goals by club, season and competition
Club	Season	League			FA Cup		League Cup		Champions League		Total	
Club	Season	Division	Apps	Goals	Apps	Goals	Apps	Goals	Apps	Goals	Apps	Goals
Everton	2019–20	Women's Super League	3	0	4	0	0	0	—		7	0
Everton	2020–21	Women's Super League	18	0	2	0	1	0	—		21	0
Everton	2021–22	Women's Super League	18	0	2	0	1	0	—		21	0
Everton	Total		39	0	8	0	2	0	—		49	0
Manchester City	2022–23	Women's Super League	3	0	1	0	5	0	0	0	9	0
Manchester City	2023–24	Women's Super League	0	0	0	0	2	0	—		2	0
Manchester City	Total		3	0	1	0	7	0	0	0	11	0
Career total			42	0	9	0	9	0	0	0	60	0

=== International ===
As of 27 October 2024

Appearances and goals by national team and year
National team	Year	Apps	Goals
England	2021	1	0
Total		1	0

National team	Year	Apps	Goals
Scotland	2023	2	0
Scotland	2024	3	0
Total		5	0

== Honours ==
Manchester City

- FA WSL: 2015 runner-up

Everton

- Women's FA Cup: 2019–20 runner-up

Washington Spirit

- NWSL Challenge Cup: 2025

England U20

- FIFA U-20 Women's World Cup third place: 2018

England

- Arnold Clark Cup: 2023

Individual

- FIFA U-20 Women's World Cup Golden Glove: 2018
