= 2016 Big East Conference women's soccer season =

Big East Conference
- Season: 2016

2016 Big East Conference women's soccer standings
	Conf.						Overall
Team	W		L		T	PCT	W		L		T	PCT
Marquette ‍†‍‍^{y}	7	–	2	–	0	.778	12	–	8	–	2	.591
DePaul ‍†‍‍	7	–	2	–	0	.778	10	–	6	–	3	.605
No. 3 Georgetown ‍‍‡‍^{y}	6	–	1	–	2	.778	19	–	2	–	3	.854
St. John's ‍‍‍	5	–	2	–	2	.667	11	–	4	–	5	.675
Providence ‍‍‍	5	–	3	–	1	.611	11	–	7	–	2	.600
Butler ‍‍‍	4	–	4	–	1	.500	11	–	7	–	2	.600
Creighton ‍‍‍	4	–	5	–	0	.444	9	–	6	–	2	.588
Villanova ‍‍‍	2	–	7	–	0	.222	4	–	14	–	0	.222
Seton Hall ‍‍‍	1	–	8	–	0	.111	5	–	11	–	1	.324
Xavier ‍‍‍	1	–	8	–	0	.111	7	–	11	–	1	.395
† – Conference champion ‡ – 2016 Big East Tournament champion y – Invited to the NCAA tournament As of 2016-11-21; Rankings from NSCAA

The 2016 Big East Conference women's soccer season was the fourth season for the newly realigned Big East Conference.

The St. John's Red Storm are the defending regular season champions. The Butler Bulldogs are the defending tournament champions.

== Changes from 2015 ==
- None

== Teams ==
=== Stadiums and locations ===
Team	Location	Stadium	Capacity
Butler Bulldogs	Indianapolis, Indiana	Butler Bowl	7,500
Creighton Bluejays	Omaha, Nebraska	Morrison Stadium	6,000
DePaul Blue Demons	Chicago, Illinois	Cacciatore Stadium	1,200
Georgetown Hoyas	Washington, D.C.	Shaw Field	2,000
Marquette Golden Eagles	Milwaukee, Wisconsin	Valley Fields	1,600
Providence Friars	Providence, Rhode Island	Glay Field	3,000
St. John's Red Storm	Jamaica, New York	Belson Stadium	2,168
Seton Hall Pirates	South Orange, New Jersey	Owen T. Carroll Field	1,800
Villanova Wildcats	Villanova, Pennsylvania	Villanova Soccer Complex	1,000
Xavier Musketeers	Cincinnati, Ohio	XU Soccer Complex	1,500

== Regular season ==
=== Results ===
Team/opponent	BUT	CRE	DEP	GEO	MRQ	PC	STJ	SET	VIL	XAV
Butler Bulldogs										
Creighton Bluejays										
DePaul Blue Demons										
Georgetown Hoyas										
Marquette Golden Eagles										
Providence Friars										
St. John's Red Storm										
Seton Hall Pirates										
Villanova Wildcats										
Xavier Musketeers										

=== Rankings ===
Legend
Increase in ranking
Decrease in ranking
Not ranked previous week

		Pre	Wk 2	Wk 3	Wk 4	Wk 5	Wk 6	Wk 7	Wk 8	Wk 9	Wk 10	Wk 11	Wk 12	Wk 13	Final
Butler	C														
Creighton	C														
DePaul	C														
Georgetown	C														
Marquette	C														
Providence	C														
Seton Hall	C														
St. John's	C														
Villanova	C														
Xavier	C														

== Postseason ==
=== Big East tournament ===
Tournament details to be announced.

=== NCAA tournament ===
Seed	Region	School	1st round	2nd round	3rd round	Quarterfinals	Semifinals	Championship

== All-Big East awards and teams ==
2016 Big East Women's Soccer Individual Awards
Award	Recipient(s)
Player of the Year	
Coach of the Year	
Freshman of the Year	

2016 Big East Women's Soccer All-Conference Teams
First Team	Second Team	Rookie Team

== See also ==
- 2016 NCAA Division I women's soccer season
- 2016 Big East Conference Women's Soccer Tournament
- 2016 Big East Conference men's soccer season
