= Carlin Hudson =

American association football player

Personal information
- Full name: Carlin Xiaoying Hudson
- Date of birth: November 1, 1996 (age 30)
- Place of birth: Berkeley, California
- Height: 5 ft 9 in (1.75 m)
- Position: Defender

College career
Years	Team	Apps	(Gls)
2014–2017	Yale Bulldogs	50	(2)

Senior career*
Years	Team	Apps	(Gls)
2018	North Carolina Courage	0	(0)
2019	Washington Spirit	4	(0)
2019–2020	Guingamp	13	(1)
- * Club domestic league appearances and goals

Carlin Xiaoying Hudson (born November 1, 1996) is an American former soccer defender. She is the director of strategy for the National Women's Soccer League (NWSL).

== Playing career ==
=== Yale Bulldogs ===
Hudson attended Yale University, where, as a walk-on, she played for the Yale Bulldogs from 2014 to 2018. In her freshman year, she was an honorable mention All-Ivy selection, and received the team's Captain Cup after starting 15 games. Hudson missed the following year due to a season-ending injury in the first game of the season, but would start every game in her junior and senior seasons, winning the team's Fritz Rodriguez Defensive Player of the Year Award each year. In her senior year, Hudson was a first-team All-Ivy selection, first-team All-New England selection, and academic All-Ivy selection. In total, she started 50 games, with 2 goals and 4 assists.

=== North Carolina Courage ===
Hudson was drafted 39th overall in the fourth round of the 2018 NWSL College Draft by the North Carolina Courage. She was the first Yale player, and just the fourth Ivy to be selected in the NWSL College Draft, joining Princeton's Jen Hoy (2013), Harvard's Midge Purce (2017) and Princeton's Tyler Lussi (2017).She was not signed to the active roster for the start of the 2018 season, and would not make any league appearances for the Courage. In July 2018 she was named to the team's roster for the first-ever Women's International Champions Cup Tournament.

=== Washington Spirit ===
Hudson joined the Washington Spirit in March 2019 as a non-roster invitee for their pre-season training camp. In April, she was signed to their supplemental roster in advance of the 2019 NWSL season. Hudson made her first professional appearance on May 11, 2019, as an 84th-minute substitute in Washington's 3–2 win over Sky Blue FC.

== Post-playing career ==
In 2022, she was hired as the NWSL's director of strategy, becoming the first ex-player to be hired by the league.

== Personal life ==
She married Matthew Oplinger in October 2023.
