= Claire Emslie =

Scottish footballer (born 1994)

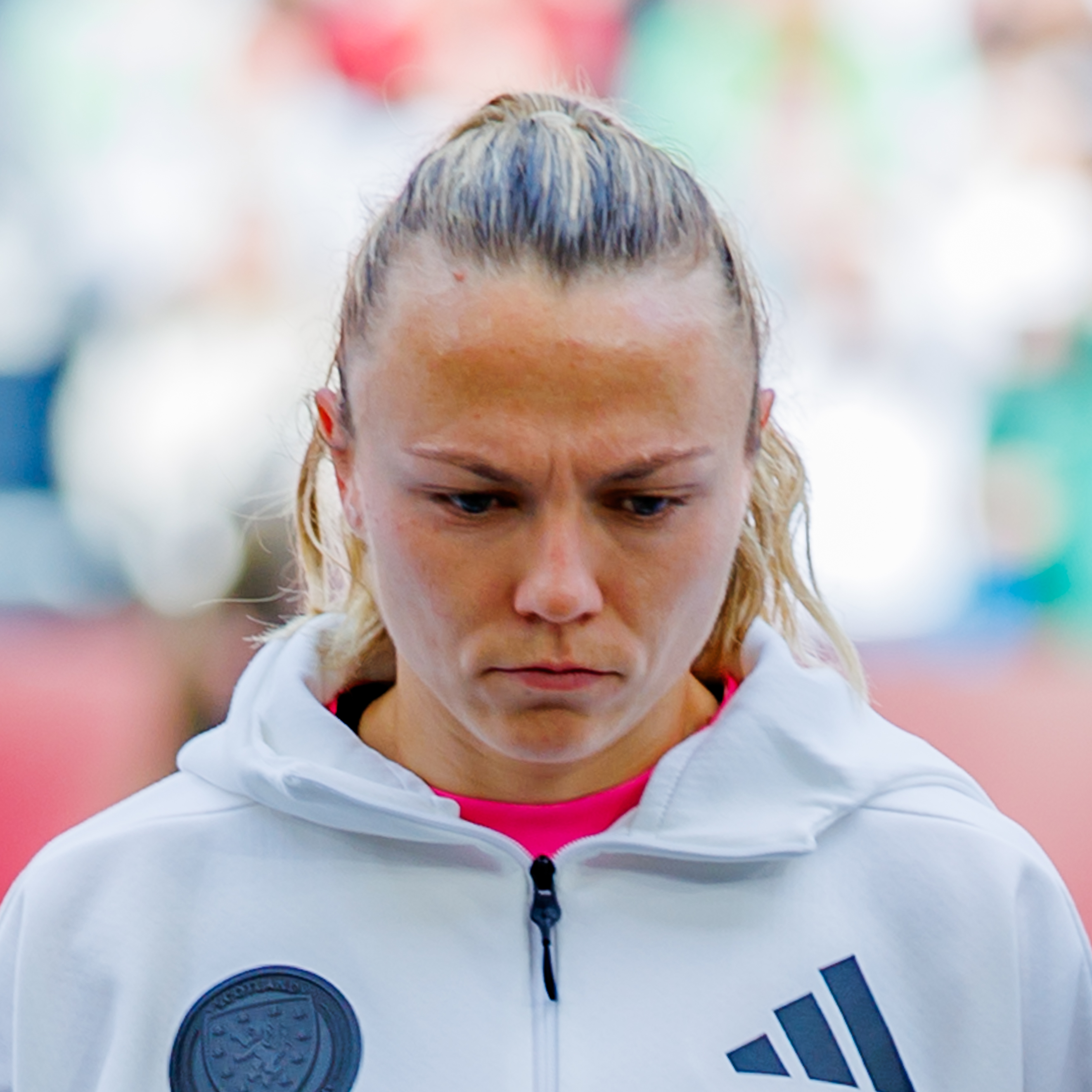
- Emslie with Scotland in 2025

Personal information
- Full name: Claire Emslie
- Date of birth: 8 March 1994 (age 32)
- Place of birth: Edinburgh, Scotland
- Height: 1.70 m (5 ft 7 in)
- Position: Forward

Team information
- Current team: Angel City
- Number: 10

College career
Years	Team	Apps	(Gls)
2012–2015	Florida Atlantic Owls	76	(29)

Senior career*
Years	Team	Apps	(Gls)
2011–2013	Hibernian	35	(18)
2016–2017	Bristol City	20	(11)
2017–2019	Manchester City	31	(8)
2019–2020	Orlando Pride	11	(0)
2019–2020	→ Melbourne City (loan)	12	(5)
2020	→ Everton (loan)	7	(2)
2020–2022	Everton	30	(3)
2022–	Angel City	81	(14)

International career^{‡}
2008–2009	Scotland U15	2	(0)
2009–2011	Scotland U17	15	(3)
2010–2013	Scotland U19	16	(6)
2013–	Scotland	77	(17)
- * Club domestic league appearances and goals as of 05:59, 12 November 2026 (UTC) ‡ National team caps and goals as of 15 October 2026 (UTC)

Claire Emslie (born 8 March 1994) is a Scottish professional footballer who plays as a forward for Angel City FC in the American National Women's Soccer League (NWSL) and the Scotland national team.

Emslie made her senior international debut for Scotland in 2013. At the 2019 FIFA Women's World Cup, she scored Scotland's first ever goal in the competition, becoming the first woman to score in a World Cup for Scotland.

She previously played professionally for Hibernian, Bristol City, Manchester City, Orlando Pride, Melbourne City, and Everton.

== College career ==
Between 2012 and 2015, Emslie attended Florida Atlantic University and played for the Florida Atlantic Owls. She ended her college career with 29 goals and 10 assists in four seasons. Emslie majored in exercise physiology.

== Club career ==
=== Hibernian, 2011–13 ===
Emslie began her senior career in 2011 with Scottish Women's Premier League team Hibernian, making her debut in a league game against Falkirk on 24 April. In total, Emslie made thirty-five appearances and scored eighteen times in three seasons with Hibernian, winning the Scottish League Cup in her debut year.

=== Bristol City, 2016–17 ===
On 16 June 2016, Emslie returned to the UK and joined FA WSL 2 side Bristol City. She went on to score ten goals in twelve matches for Bristol, leading her team to promotion into the FA WSL. She signed a new contract with Bristol in February 2017.

=== Manchester City, 2017–19 ===
On 1 July 2017, following the end of the shortened FA WSL Spring Series, Emslie joined Manchester City. She scored her first goal for the team in an FA WSL Cup group stage win over Oxford United on 2 November 2017. She won a domestic cup double with City during the 2018–19 season, lifting both the League Cup and FA Cup.

=== Orlando Pride, 2019–20 ===
On 30 May 2019, Emslie agreed to a move to Orlando Pride of the National Women's Soccer League, joining the team after Scotland's involvement at the 2019 FIFA Women's World Cup. She was the only one of the Pride's nine players at the World Cup to not progress to the knockout round. She made her debut for the team on 20 July 2019, coming on as a substitute for Rachel Hill in a 1–0 win over Sky Blue FC.

==== Loan to Melbourne City, 2019–20 ====
Emslie was loaned to Australian club Melbourne City in November 2019 following the end of the 2019 NWSL season. Emslie scored four regular-season goals as Melbourne successfully defended their Premiership title and beat Sydney FC in the 2020 Grand Final in February 2020.

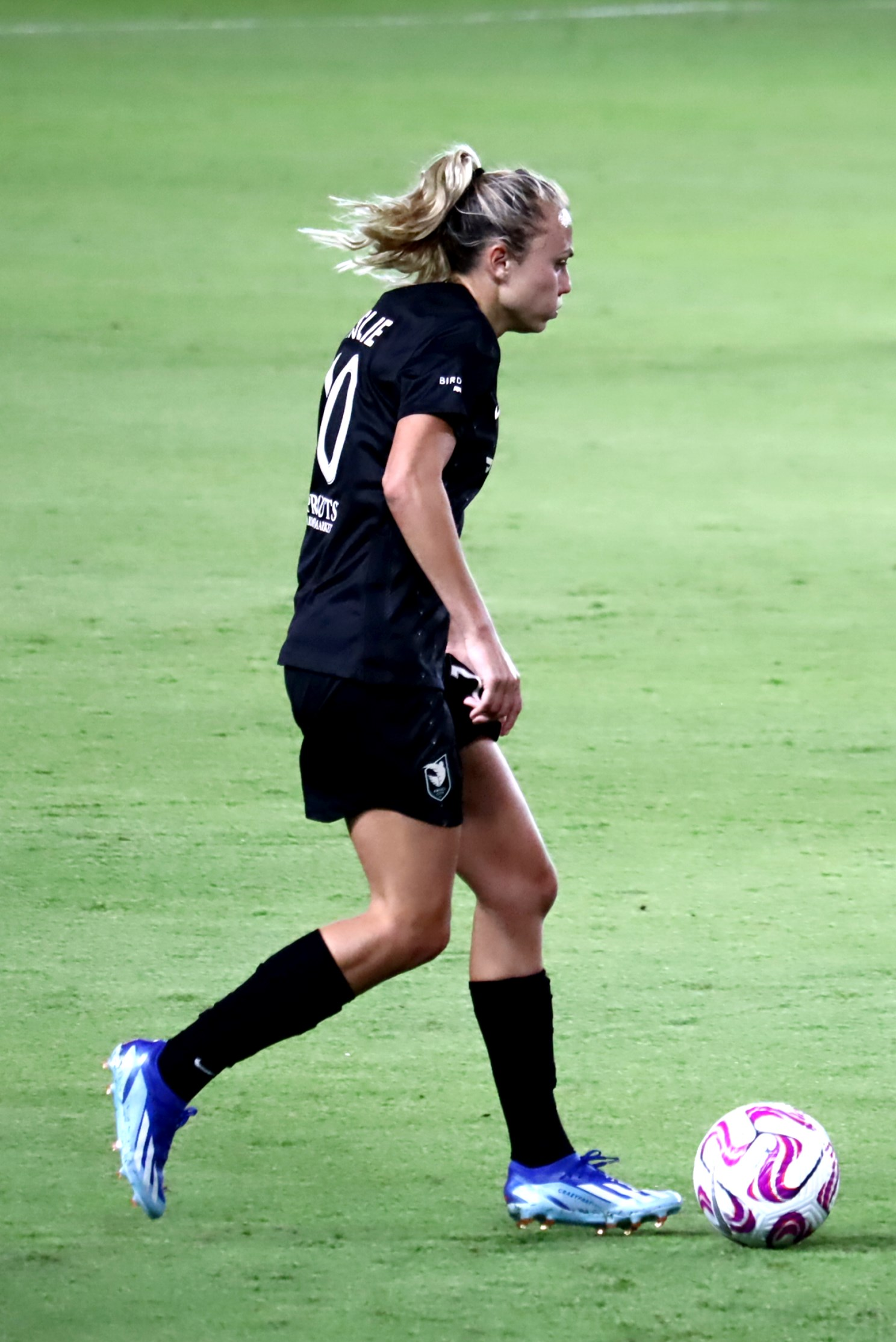
Emslie in 2023 with Angel City FC.

=== Everton, 2020–22 ===
With the 2020 NWSL season suspended due to the COVID-19 pandemic, and Orlando withdrawing from the 2020 NWSL Challenge Cup after positive COVID-19 tests among players and staff, Emslie joined FA WSL club Everton on loan in August 2020, ahead of the 2020–21 season. She made the move permanent on 31 December 2020, signing an 18-month contract with Everton.

=== Angel City FC, 2022– ===
Angel City FC acquired the rights to sign Emslie in the 2022 NWSL Expansion Draft in December 2021 and then officially signed with her on 7 July 2022. During the club's inaugural season, Emslie competed in 10 matches, recording 784 minutes on the pitch and scoring three goals. During her debut on 9 July, she scored the game-winning goal against the San Diego Wave. On 28 August, she scored Angel City's third goal in a 3-1 win against Gotham FC. The club finished their first season in eighth place with a 8–9–5 record.

During the 2023 season, Emslie started in 17 of the 20 games she played and scored three goals. She scored the game-opener during the club's 2-1 win against Orlando Pride on 2 April. On 7 May, she scored a goal and provided an assist during Angel City's 3-2 win against Kansas City Current. She scored Angel City's lone goal, an olympico, in a 4-1 loss to Seattle Reign FC on 27 May. Angel City finished in fifth place during the regular season and advanced to the playoffs for the first time, where they were eliminated by Seattle in the quarterfinal match. At the end of the 2023 season, Emslie was Angel City's second highest all-time goal scorer with 7 goals in all appearances.

Emslie scored Angel City's first goal of the 2024 season, a penalty kick against her former club Orlando Pride on 22 March 2024, which ended as a 1-1 draw. On 21 April 2024, Emslie recorded her first brace for Angel City in a 2-1 victory against North Carolina Courage to secure Angel City's first home win of the season. On 18 August 2024, after scoring a brace in a friendly match against FC Juárez, Emslie overtook Savannah McCaskill as the all-time goal scoring leader for Angel City with 16 goals across all competitions. Emslie made her 50th regular-season appearance for Angel City on 23 September 2024, and scored the equalizing goal to secure a 2-2 draw against Portland Thorns FC. On 22 November 2024, after the conclusion of the 2024 season, Angel City announced that they had signed a new two-year contract with Emslie, keeping her with Angel City through the 2026 season.

== International career ==
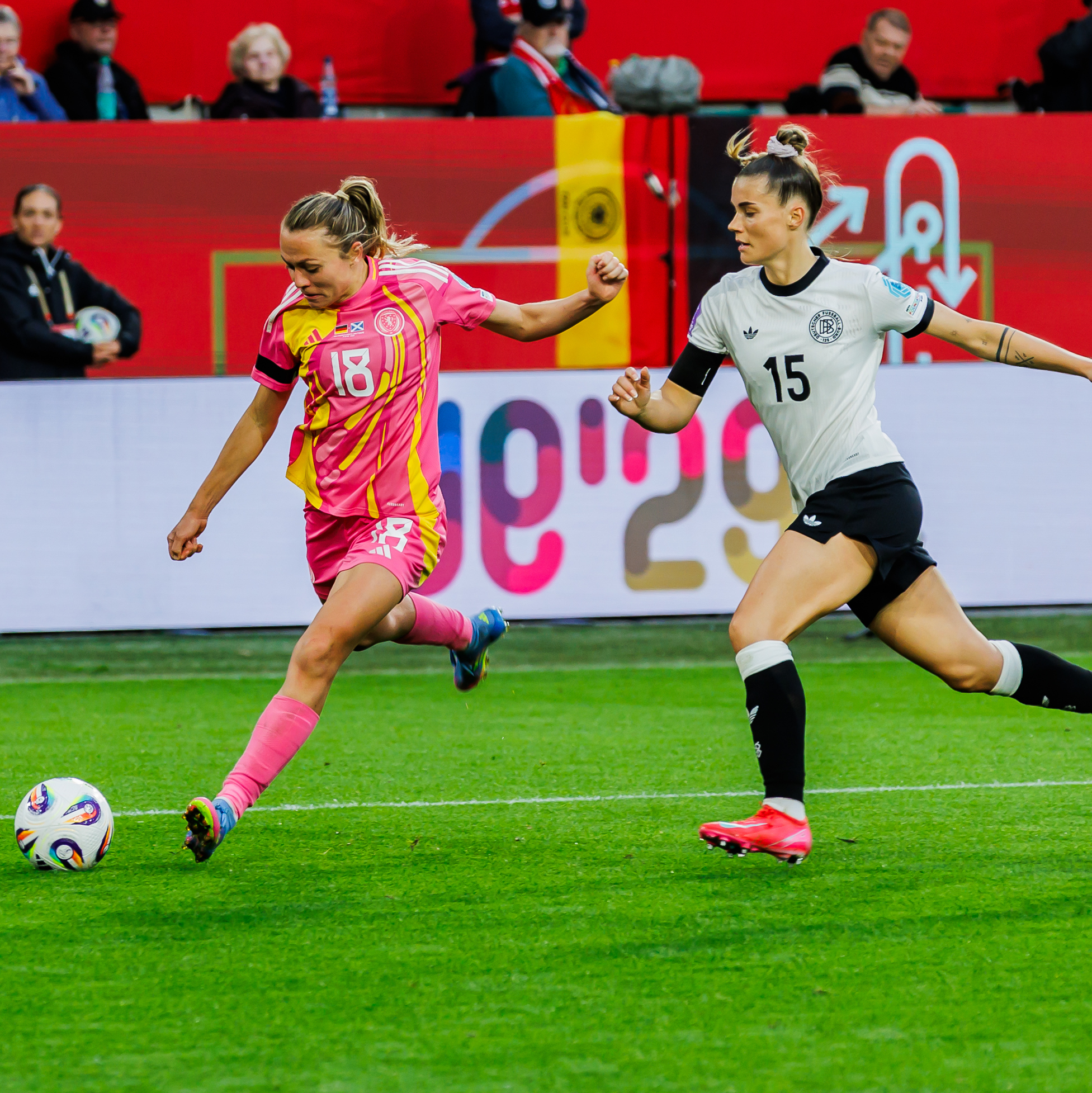
Emslie (left, challenged by Selina Cerci) crosses the ball during a match between Scotland and Germany, 2025

Emslie has represented Scotland internationally on the senior national team as well as the under-19 and under-17 national teams. She scored goals in consecutive UEFA Women's Under-19 Championship tournaments in 2012 and 2013 respectively.

In June 2013, Emslie made her senior debut against Iceland in an international friendly. After it became clear that she would be based in the United States for a long period, Emslie was not considered for international selection until her studies in Florida concluded and she moved to England. Her second cap came in a friendly against Denmark in January 2017.

In August 2017, she was named to the national team when new manager Shelley Kerr called her up for a friendly against Hungary. Emslie subsequently scored her first senior international goal in that friendly in a 3–0 win at the Telki Training Centre in Pest County.

=== 2019 FIFA Women's World Cup ===
Kerr selected Emslie to represent Scotland at the 2019 FIFA Women's World Cup in France, the first time the nation had ever qualified for the tournament. Emslie scored Scotland's first-ever World Cup goal on 9 June 2019 in a group stage defeat to England. Scotland's World Cup run ended on 19 June with a dramatic 3–3 draw against Argentina in the group stage.

Emslie earned her 50th cap for Scotland during the 2023 Pinatar Cup in Spain during the final match of the tournament against Wales on 21 February 2023.

After a year out of the international squad due to pregnancy, Emslie was recalled in May 2026.

== Personal life ==
Emslie was born in Edinburgh to parents Neil and Anna before being raised in Penicuik. She counts former Hibernian teammate Caroline Weir and Bristol teammate Chloe Arthur, both of whom also play for Scotland, among her close friends. Emslie married Jonny Marsh in December 2023 and announced she was pregnant in July 2025. Her first child, Jamie, was born in December 2025.

== Career statistics ==
=== Club ===
As of 9 May 2025.

Club statistics
Club	Season	League			Cup		League Cup		Continental (Note: Includes UEFA Women's Champions League)		Total	
Club	Season	Division	Apps	Goals	Apps	Goals	Apps	Goals	Apps	Goals	Apps	Goals
Hibernian	2011	Premier League	16	3	0	0	2	0	—		18	3
Hibernian	2012	Premier League	10	8	0	0	1	0	—		11	8
Hibernian	2013	Premier League	9	7	0	0	1	0	—		10	7
Hibernian	Total		35	18	0	0	4	0	—		39	18
Bristol City	2016	FA WSL 2	12	10	0	0	1	0	—		13	10
Bristol City	2017	FA WSL 1	8	1	0	0	0	0	—		8	1
Bristol City	Total		20	11	0	0	1	0	—		21	11
Manchester City	2017–18	FA WSL	17	4	3	1	7	3	8	1	35	9
Manchester City	2018–19	FA WSL	14	4	4	0	7	2	1	0	26	6
Manchester City	Total		31	8	7	1	14	5	9	1	61	12
Orlando Pride	2019	NWSL	11	0	—		—		—		11	0
Melbourne City (loan)	2019–20	W-League	10	4	—		2 (Note: Appearance(s) in the W-League Finals series)	1	—		12	5
Everton (loan)	2020–21	FA WSL	19	3	—		1	0	—		20	3
Everton	2021–22	FA WSL	18	2	—		1	0	—		19	2
Everton	Total		37	5	—		2	0	—		39	5
Angel City FC	2022	NWSL	10	3	—		—		—		10	3
Angel City FC	2023	NWSL	19	3	5	1	1 (Note: Includes NWSL Playoffs)	0	—		25	4
Angel City FC	2024	NWSL	26	7	3	1	—		—		29	8
Angel City FC	2025	NWSL	8	0	—		—		—		8	0
Angel City FC	Total		63	13	8	2	1	0	—		72	15
Career total			206	59	15	3	24	6	9	1	254	69

=== International ===
As of the match played on 16 July 2024

National team	Year	Apps	Goals
Scotland	2013	1	0
Scotland	2017	4	2
Scotland	2018	10	1
Scotland	2019	11	3
Scotland	2020	4	1
Scotland	2021	8	2
Scotland	2022	10	2
Scotland	2023	10	1
Scotland	2024	8	4
Total		66	16

Scores and results list Scotland's goal tally first, score column indicates score after each Emslie goal.

List of international goals scored by Claire Emslie
No.	Date	Venue	Opponent	Score	Result	Competition	Ref.
1	14 September 2017	Telki Training Centre, Telki	Hungary	2–0	3–0	Friendly	
2	24 October 2017	St Mirren Park, Paisley	Albania	4–0	5–0	2019 FIFA Women's World Cup qualification	
3	10 April 2018	St Mirren Park, Paisley	Poland	2–0	3–0	2019 FIFA Women's World Cup qualification	
4	9 June 2019	Allianz Riviera, Nice	England	1–2	1–2	2019 FIFA Women's World Cup	
5	30 August 2019	Easter Road, Edinburgh	Cyprus	1–0	8–0	UEFA Women's Euro 2021 qualification	
6	8 November 2019	Elbasan Arena, Elbasan	Albania	1–0	5–0	UEFA Women's Euro 2021 qualification	
7	4 March 2020	Pinatar Arena, San Pedro del Pinatar	Ukraine	3–0	3–0	2020 Pinatar Cup	
8	19 February 2021	AEK Arena, Larnaca	Cyprus	7–0	10–0	UEFA Women's Euro 2021 qualification	
9	21 September 2021	Hampden Park, Glasgow	Faroe Islands	7–1	7–1	2023 FIFA Women's World Cup qualification	
10	2 September 2022	MAC³PARK Stadion, Zwolle	Netherlands	1–1	1–2	Friendly	
11	14 November 2022	Estadio Municipal Los Arcos, Orihuela	Venezuela	2–0	2–1	Friendly	
12	11 April 2023	Hampden Park, Glasgow	Costa Rica	2–0	4–0	Friendly	
13	31 May 2024	Hampden Park, Glasgow	Israel	1–0	4–1	UEFA Women's Euro 2025 qualification	
14	31 May 2024	Hampden Park, Glasgow	Israel	3–0	4–1	UEFA Women's Euro 2025 qualification	
15	12 July 2024	Štadión pod Zoborom, Nitra	Slovakia	1–0	2–0	UEFA Women's Euro 2025 qualification	
16	12 July 2024	Štadión pod Zoborom, Nitra	Slovakia	2–0	2–0	UEFA Women's Euro 2025 qualification	
17	9 October 2026	Stadion Arnošta Košťála, Pardubice, Czech Republic	Czech Republic	2–0	2–0	2027 FIFA Women's World Cup qualification	

== Honours ==
Hibernian

- Scottish Women's Premier League Cup: 2011

Manchester City

- FA Women's League Cup: 2018–19
- Women's FA Cup: 2018–19

Melbourne City

- W-League Premiership: 2019–20
- W-League Championship: 2019–20
