= Rikke Sevecke =

Danish footballer

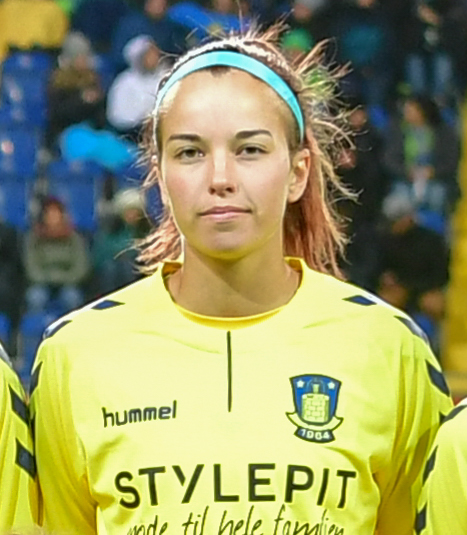
- Sevecke with Brøndby in 2016

Personal information
- Full name: Rikke Læntver Sevecke
- Date of birth: 15 June 1996 (age 30)
- Place of birth: Nykøbing Falster, Denmark
- Height: 1.78 m (5 ft 10 in)
- Position: Defender

Youth career
- 1999–2011: B 1921
- 2011–2013: BSF

College career
Years	Team	Apps	(Gls)
2017	Northwestern Ohio	24	(8)

Senior career*
Years	Team	Apps	(Gls)
2013–2015	BSF		
2015–2017	Brøndby		
2018–2019	Brøndby		
2019–2020	Fleury 91	16	(0)
2020–2023	Everton	52	(2)
2023	Portland Thorns	0	(0)

International career
2012	Denmark U16	6	(0)
2012–2013	Denmark U17	10	(0)
2013–2015	Denmark U19	25	(2)
2015–2018	Denmark U23	2	(0)
2016–2023	Denmark	54	(5)
- * Club domestic league appearances and goals

Rikke Læntver Sevecke (born 15 June 1996) is a Danish football coach and former professional player who played as a defender for the Denmark national team. Her career spanned multiple European clubs, including Danish A-Liga sides BSF and Brøndby, Première Ligue club Fleury 91, Women's Super League club Everton, and NWSL side Portland Thorns. She currently works for A-Liga club HB Køge. Sevecke earned 54 caps and scored 5 goals for the Denmark national team. In January 2024 she retired from her active playing career after being diagnosed with arrhythmogenic cardiomyopathy.

== Club career ==
Nykøbing Falster-born Sevecke began playing football as a three-year-old. She moved away from home to join Ballerup-Skovlunde Fodbold when she was 16 years old. After establishing herself as one of the best young defenders in the Elitedivisionen, she became Per Nielsen's first signing for Brøndby IF in January 2015.

In January 2018 Sevecke returned to Brøndby after a six-month spell playing college soccer for the University of Northwestern Ohio. She would ultimately win three Danish league titles (2014–2015, 2016–2017, 2018–2019) and three Danish Cups (2014–2015, 2016–2017, 2017–2018) for the club.

Sevecke played for FC Fleury 91 in France in the 2019–2020 season, before signing with Everton in the Women's Super League in summer 2020. She appeared in 52 games (45 starts) for Everton across three WSL seasons, mostly at centerback, while notching two goals and one assist. In May 2023, the club announced she would leave at the end of her contract.

In September 2023, Sevecke joined Portland Thorns FC in the NWSL for the remainder of the 2023 season, with a club option for the 2024 season. She did not feature in any of the club's four remaining games that season. On 20 November 2023, Portland announced that Sevecke would not be returning for the 2024 season.

== International career ==
Sevecke appeared 25 times for the Denmark women's national under-19 football team, including at the 2013 and 2015 editions of the UEFA Women's Under-19 Championship. She made her senior international debut for Denmark at the 2016 Algarve Cup, in a 4–1 defeat by Iceland.

== Career statistics ==
Scores and results list Denmark's goal tally first.

No.	Date	Venue	Opponent	Score	Result	Competition
1.	29 August 2019	Viborg Stadium, Viborg, Denmark	Malta	3–0	8–0	2022 UEFA Women's Euro Cup qualification
2.	17 September 2020	Bosnia and Herzegovina FA Training Centre, Zenica, Bosnia and Herzegovina	Bosnia and Herzegovina	3–0	4–0	2022 UEFA Women's Euro Cup qualification
3.	10 June 2021	CASA Arena Horsens, Horsens, Denmark	Australia	2–0	3–2	Friendly
4.	16 September 2021	Viborg Stadium, Viborg, Denmark	Malta	6–0	7–0	2023 FIFA Women's World Cup qualification
5.	21 February 2023	Stade Francis Le Basser, Laval, France	Uruguay	2–2	3–2	2023 Tournoi de France

== Honours ==
Individual

- WHAC Newcomer of the Year: 2017
- NAIA First Team All-American: 2017
- Danish Cup player of the year: 2019
