= Maéva Clemaron =

French footballer (born 1992)

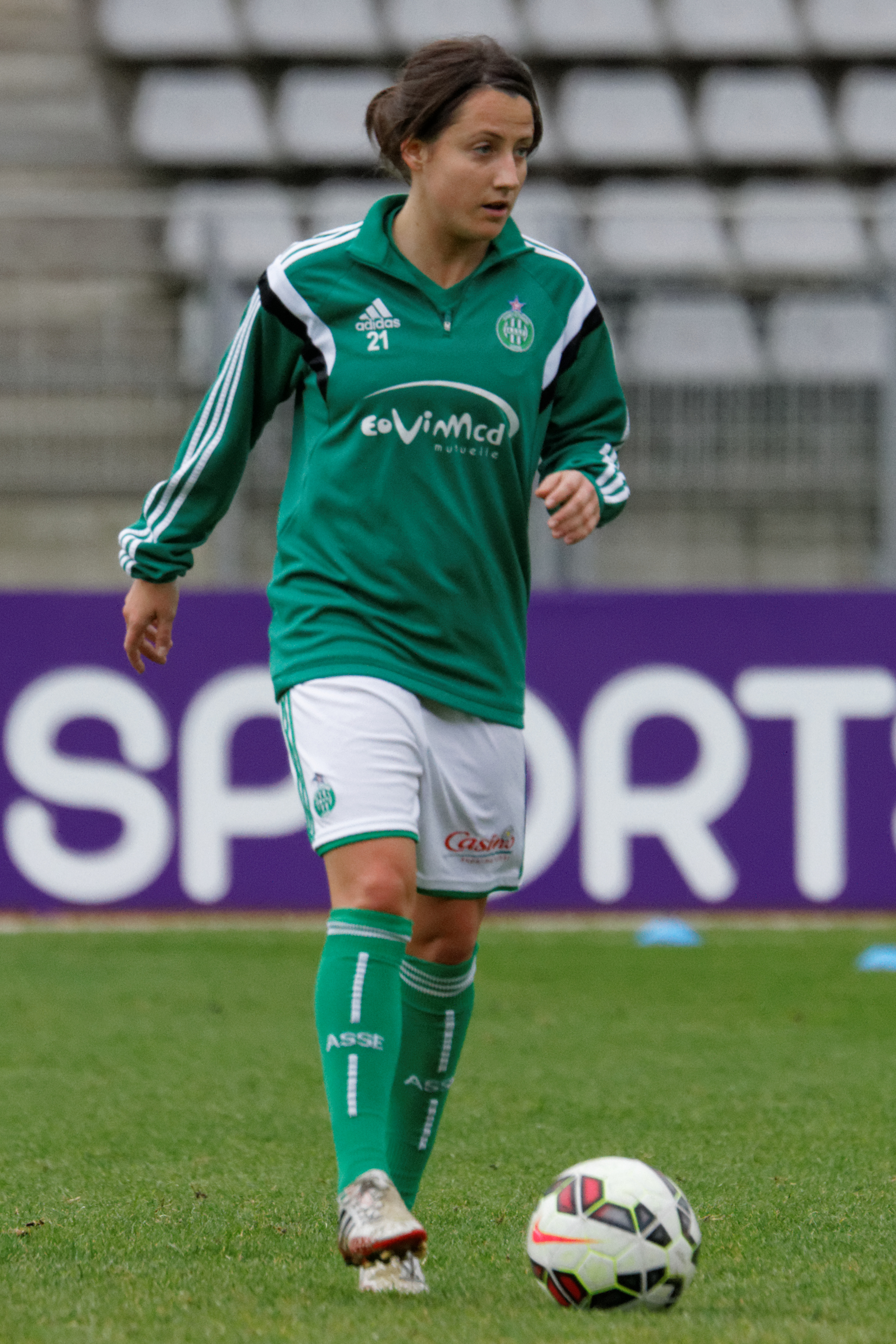
- Clemaron playing for Saint-Étienne in 2014

Personal information
- Full name: Maéva Jocelyne Clemaron
- Date of birth: 10 November 1992 (age 34)
- Place of birth: Vienne, France
- Height: 1.66 m (5 ft 5 in)
- Position: Midfielder

Team information
- Current team: Yverdon-Sport Féminin
- Number: 92

Youth career
- 2000–2005: AS Cheyssieu
- 2005–2007: AL Saint-Maurice-l'Exil
- 2007–2008: Lyon
- 2008–2010: Saint-Étienne

Senior career*
Years	Team	Apps	(Gls)
2008–2017	Saint-Étienne	138	(8)
2017–2019	Fleury	38	(1)
2019–2021	Everton	22	(0)
2021–2022	Tottenham Hotspur	21	(0)
2022–2025	Servette	58	(12)
2025–	Yverdon-Sport Féminin	5	(1)

International career^{‡}
2008	France U16	4	(0)
2008–2009	France U17	7	(2)
2011	France U19	2	(0)
2017	France U23	1	(0)
2018–2020	France	6	(1)
- * Club domestic league appearances and goals as of 21 September 2025 ‡ National team caps and goals as of 1 December 2020

Maéva Jocelyne Clemaron (born 10 November 1992) is a French professional footballer who plays as a midfielder for Swiss Nationalliga B club Yverdon-Sport Féminin. She has previously played for Saint-Étienne and Fleury in the French Division 1 Féminine, for Everton and Tottenham Hotspur in the English FA WSL and for Servette in the Swiss Women's Super League. She has represented the French national team and was part of their 2019 World Cup squad.

== Club career ==
=== France ===
Clemaron played youth football with boys at Cheyssieu, Chavany, and Saint-Maurice-l'Exil before joining Lyon's academy and then establishing herself at Saint-Étienne. She was the captain of the club, describing herself as the link between the coaching staff and the players, while emphasizing the importance of collective mentality. In May 2017, the club was relegated to the Division 2 Féminine at the conclusion of the 2016–17 Division 1 Féminine season.

Clemaron joined Fleury ahead of the 2017–18 Division 1 Féminine season. She was vice-captain at Fleury, with manager Sylvain Carric saying she's a key to the balance of the team, with her cheerful and positive personality.

=== England ===
In July 2019, Clemaron moved to England, joining FA WSL club Everton, signing a two-year contract. She made 22 appearances for the club and left in June 2021, at the end of her contract.

In July 2021, Clemaron joined Tottenham Hotspur on a one-year contract with an option for another. The coach Rehanne Skinner felt she would bring in consistency and quality into the midfield, as well as a tactical understanding to link the back four into the midfield.

=== Switzerland ===
After one year with Tottenham Hotspur, Clemaron was transferred to Swiss club Servette, to allow her to pursue her career as an architect in Switzerland.

Clemaron spent three seasons with Servette, winning two Swiss Cups and one league title. She also captained the team for her last season at the club.

In the summer of 2025, Clemaron transferred to Yverdon-Sport Féminin, On 13 September 2025, she scored her first goal for the club.

== International career ==
After playing for the French B team in 2017, Clemaron was called up for the first time for the France national team in January 2018 for a friendly match against Italy. She made her senior international debut a couple of months later at the 2018 SheBelieves Cup, coming on in place of Amandine Henry at the end of a 3–0 victory over Germany. She described it as "five minutes of pure joy". Clemaron scored her first international senior goal in March 2019, scoring the last goal of a 6–0 victory over Uruguay.

Clemaron was part of France's squad at the 2019 FIFA Women's World Cup, being called-up having only played three matches previously for the senior team.

== Career statistics ==
=== International ===
As of 1 December 2020

Appearances and goals by national team and year
National team	Year	Apps	Goals
France	2018	2	0
France	2019	2	1
France	2020	2	0
Total		6	1

Scores and results list France's goal tally first. Score column indicates score after each Clemaron goal.

International goals by date, venue, opponent, score, result and competition
No.	Date	Venue	Opponent	Score	Result	Competition
1.	4 March 2019	Stade de la Vallée du Cher, Tours, France	Uruguay	6–0	6–0	Friendly

== Personal life ==
Clemaron was born in the town of Vienne of the Isère department. She studied architecture at National School of Architecture of Strasbourg, from which she graduated in June 2017, after which she set up her own business. She is also a jewellery designer, working with Guillaume Boutry, and applying techniques she uses in architecture.
