= 2010 FA Cup =

2010 FA Cup may refer to:

- 2009–10 FA Cup
  - 2010 FA Cup final
- 2009–10 FA Women's Cup
  - 2010 FA Women's Cup final
- 2010–11 FA Cup
- 2010–11 FA Women's Cup
