= Toni Duggan =

English footballer (born 1991)

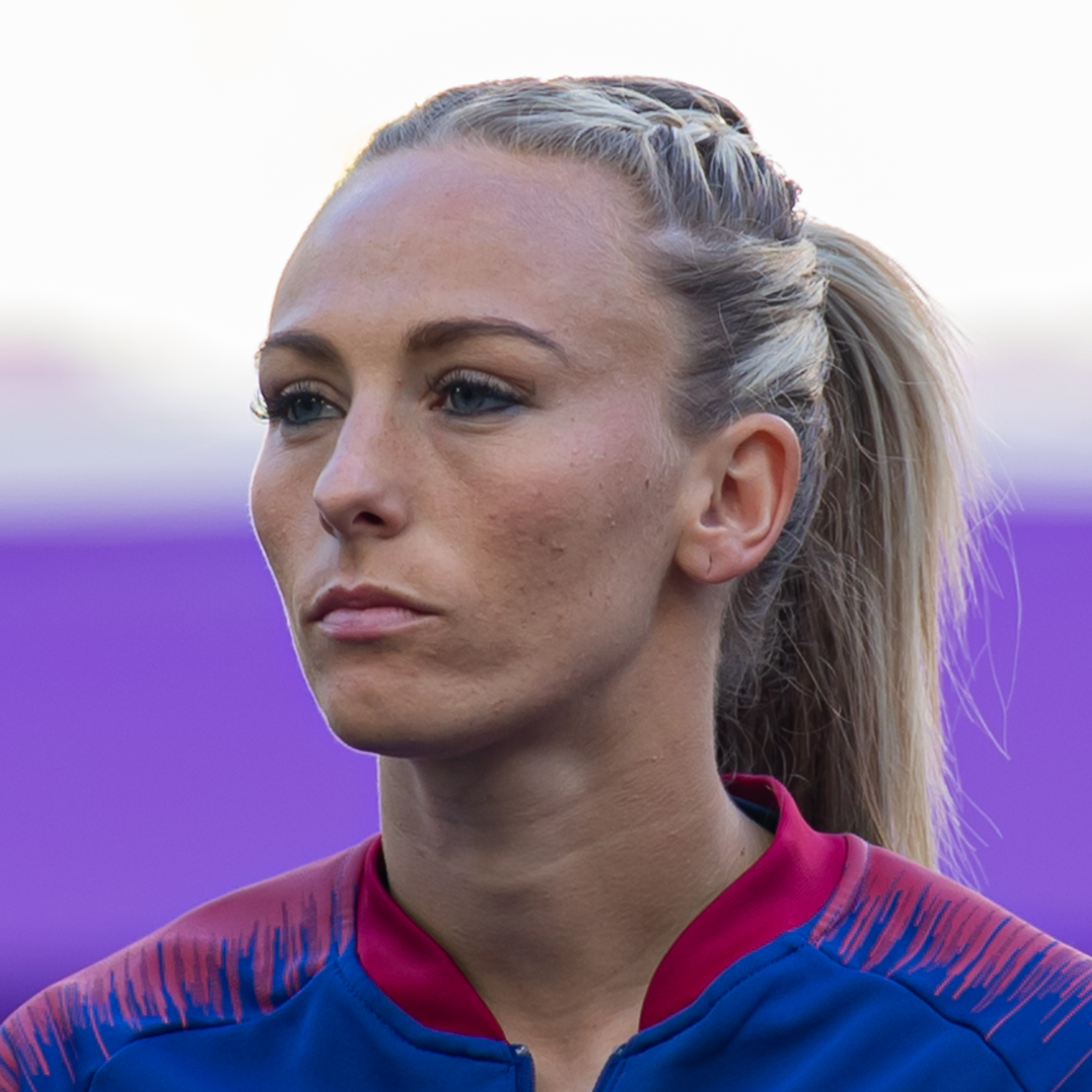
- Duggan with Barcelona in 2019

Personal information
- Full name: Toni Duggan
- Date of birth: 25 July 1991 (age 35)
- Place of birth: Liverpool, England
- Height: 5 ft 6 in (1.68 m)
- Positions: Winger; forward

Youth career
- Everton

Senior career*
Years	Team	Apps	(Gls)
2007–2013	Everton	40	(17)
2013–2017	Manchester City	44	(19)
2017–2019	Barcelona	51	(20)
2019–2021	Atlético Madrid	43	(6)
2021–2024	Everton	32	(2)

International career^{‡}
2007	England U17	3	(4)
2008–2010	England U19	28	(16)
2010	England U20	3	(1)
2010–2012	England U23	7	(3)
2012–2020	England	79	(22)
Medal record
Women's football
Representing England
FIFA Women's World Cup
Bronze medal – third place	2015 Canada
- * Club domestic league appearances and goals as of 04:00, 18 September 2024 (UTC) ‡ National team caps and goals as of 16:58, 6 November 2023 (UTC)

Toni Duggan (born 25 July 1991) is an English former footballer who played as a winger or forward. During her career, she played in England for Everton and Manchester City, and in Spain for Barcelona and Atlético Madrid.

== Club career ==
=== Everton ===
Duggan broke into the Everton side in the 2007–08 season when the regular forwards suffered injuries. She scored the winning extra–time goal against Watford Ladies to put Everton into that season's FA Women's Premier League Cup final.

Duggan was the named the FA Women's Young Player of the Year in 2009, the England Women's Under-23 Player of the Year in 2012 and the North West Female Player of the Year in 2013.

Duggan also played in Everton's 2010 FA Women's Cup final win over Arsenal. Her form in the second part of the 2011 FA WSL season led teammate Rachel Unitt to predict a call–up to the senior England squad.

=== Manchester City ===
After seven years at Everton, it was announced on 28 November 2013 that Duggan had signed with Manchester City. In August 2015, she became the first female player to receive the club's Goal of the Season award following an impressive goal against Chelsea in the Women's Super League. She was part of the team when Manchester City played in the Women's Champions League for the first time. In November 2016, Duggan scored a noted goal in City's Champions League match with Brøndby.

=== Barcelona ===
Duggan signed for Barcelona on 6 July 2017. She was part of the squad that finished runners up to Lyon in the 2019 UEFA Women's Champions League final. On 5 July 2019, Duggan announced she was leaving Barcelona after two seasons in Spain in search of a "new challenge."

=== Atlético Madrid ===
On 31 July 2019, Duggan joined Atlético Madrid. On 16 January 2021, she won her first trophy as an Atlético player appearing as a second half substitute in their 3–0 win in the Supercopa de España Femenina final against Levante. After two seasons, Duggan left Atlético Madrid. She made 55 appearances in all competitions.

=== Return to Everton ===
On 9 July 2021, Duggan returned to Everton, signing a two-year contract with the club. On 27 September 2022, Duggan announced that she was pregnant with her first child, and would miss the rest of the 2022–23 season. Consequently, she became the first England player in the Women's Super League to take maternity leave, returning to competitive action in October 2023. Duggan left the club when her contract expired at the end of the 2023–24 season.

She announced her retirement from football in September 2024.

== International career ==
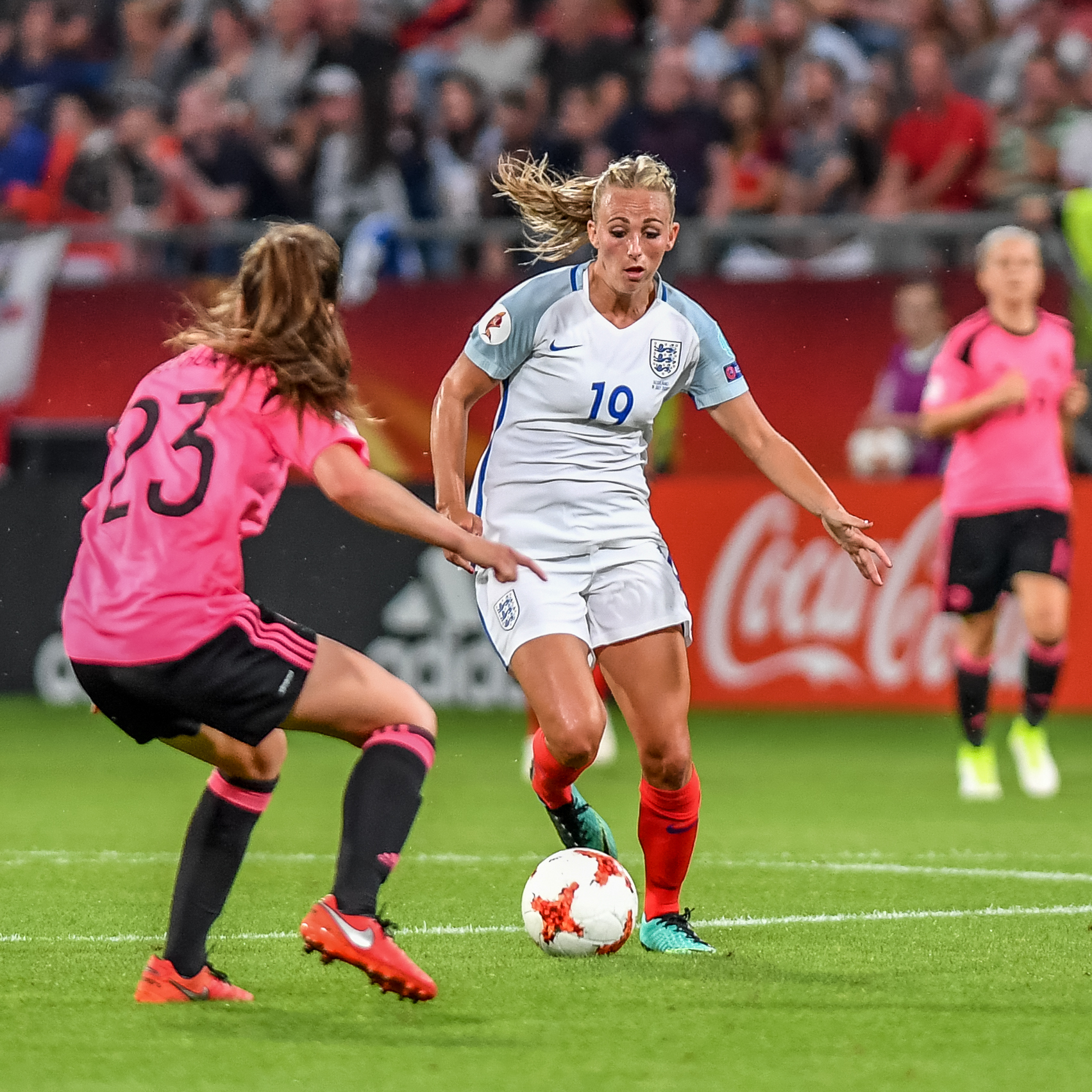
Duggan playing for England at UEFA Women's Euro 2017

In March 2007, 15-year–old Duggan came off the substitute's bench to score on her debut for England Under-17s. She also represented England at Under-19, Under-20 and Under-23 levels. She played in the FIFA U-20 Women's World Cup in both 2008 and 2010. On Duggan's 18th birthday, she scored one of the two goals in England's 2009 UEFA Women's Under-19 Championship maiden final win, against Sweden in Belarus.

Duggan completed her first cap for Hope Powell's senior team in England's 3–0 win over Croatia at Bescot Stadium on 19 September 2012. She scored her first international hat-trick in a match against Turkey on 26 September 2013. She scored another hat-trick in England's World Cup qualifying game against Montenegro in April 2014.

In 2015, Duggan was part of England's squad for the FIFA Women's World Cup in Canada. The team came third in the competition, securing the bronze medal, and were subsequently congratulated by Prince William at a reception held at Kensington Palace.

Duggan was allotted 179 when the FA announced their legacy numbers scheme to honour the 50th anniversary of England's inaugural international.

== Personal life ==
Duggan is an ambassador for the charity Saving Lives. She was a former ambassador for Kick It Out, football's anti-discrimination organisation.

On 27 September 2022, Duggan announced that she was pregnant with her first child, and would miss the rest of the WSL season. In March 2023, she announced the birth of her daughter.

== Career statistics ==
=== Club ===
Appearances and goals by club, season and competition
Club	Season	League			FA Cup (Note: Includes the Women's FA Cup and Copa de la Reina)		League Cup (Note: Includes the FA WSL Cup and Supercopa de España Femenina)		Continental (Note: Includes the UEFA Women's Champions League)		Total	
Club	Season	Division	Apps	Goals	Apps	Goals	Apps	Goals	Apps	Goals	Apps	Goals
Everton	2011	Women's Super League	14	3	?	?	—		9	6	23	9
Everton	2012	Women's Super League	13	5	?	?	3	0	2	0	18	5
Everton	2013	Women's Super League	13	9	?	?	4	2	—		17	11
Everton	Total		40	17	?	?	7	2	11	6	58	25
Manchester City	2014	Women's Super League	13	4	2	3	6	4	—		21	11
Manchester City	2015	Women's Super League	10	6	3	2	5	4	—		18	12
Manchester City	2016	Women's Super League	15	5	2	0	3	1	2	0	22	6
Manchester City	2017	Women's Super League	6	4	3	0	2	0	8	4	19	8
Manchester City	Total		44	19	10	5	16	9	10	4	80	37
Barcelona	2017–18	Primera División	26	11	3	0	—		6	3	35	14
Barcelona	2018–19	Primera División	25	9	3	1	—		9	5	37	15
Barcelona	Total		51	20	6	1	0	0	15	8	72	29
Atlético Madrid	2019–20	Primera División	15	5	1	0	1	1	4	0	21	6
Atlético Madrid	2020–21	Primera División	28	1	1	0	2	0	3	1	34	2
Atlético Madrid	Total		43	6	2	0	3	1	7	1	55	8
Everton	2021–22	Women's Super League	22	2	3	0	3	1	—		28	3
Everton	2022–23	Women's Super League	0	0	0	0	0	0	—		0	0
Everton	2023–24	Women's Super League	10	0	1	1	4	2	—		15	3
Everton	Total		32	2	4	1	7	3	—		43	6
Career total			210	64	22	7	33	15	43	19	308	105

=== International ===
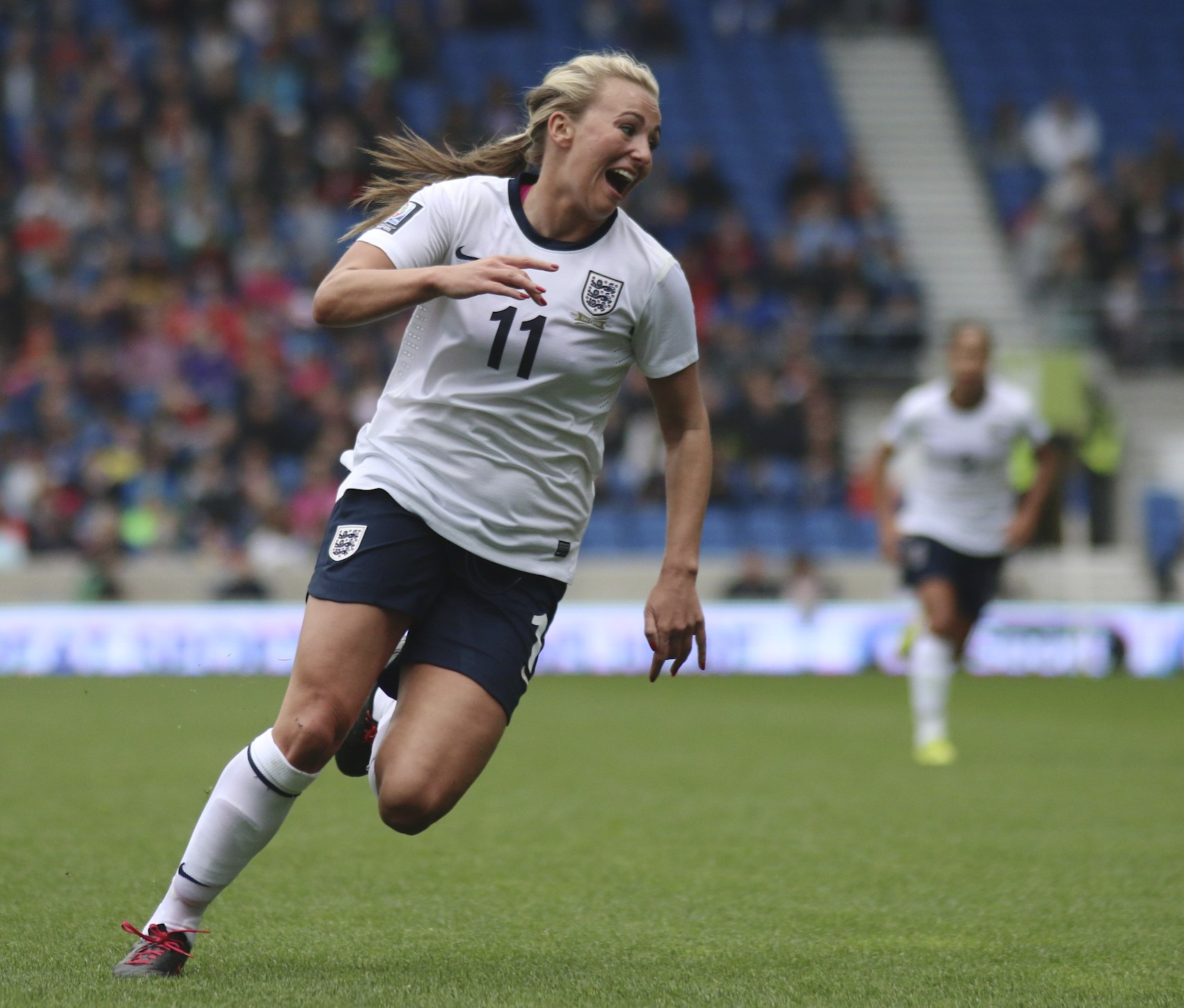
Duggan playing for England in 2014

Appearances and goals by national team and year
National team	Year	Apps	Goals
England	2012	2	0
England	2013	12	8
England	2014	10	6
England	2015	9	0
England	2016	8	1
England	2017	13	4
England	2018	12	3
England	2019	10	0
England	2020	3	0
Total		79	22

Scores and results list England's goal tally first, score column indicates score after each Duggan goal.

List of international goals scored by Toni Duggan
No.	Date	Venue	Opponent	Score	Result	Competition
1	8 March 2013	GSZ Stadium, Larnaca, Cyprus	Scotland	2–1	4–4	2013 Cyprus Cup
2	11 March 2013	GSZ Stadium, Larnaca, Cyprus	New Zealand	3–1	3–1	2013 Cyprus Cup
3	15 July 2013	Linköping Arena, Linköping, Sweden	Russia	1–1	1–1	UEFA Women's Euros 2013
4	26 September 2013	Fratton Park, Portsmouth, England	Turkey	1–0	8–0	2015 FIFA Women's World Cup qualification
5	26 September 2013	Fratton Park, Portsmouth, England	Turkey	2–0	8–0	2015 FIFA Women's World Cup qualification
6	26 September 2013	Fratton Park, Portsmouth, England	Turkey	5–0	8–0	2015 FIFA Women's World Cup qualification
7	26 October 2013	The Den, London, England	Wales	2–0	2–0	2015 FIFA Women's World Cup qualification
8	31 October 2013	Adana 5 Ocak Stadium, Adana, Turkey	Turkey	3–0	4–0	2015 FIFA Women's World Cup qualification
9	5 March 2014	GSZ Stadium, Larnaca, Cyprus	Italy	2–0	2–0	2014 Cyprus Cup
10	5 April 2014	Falmer Stadium, Brighton and Hove, England	Montenegro	1–0	9–0	2015 FIFA Women's World Cup qualification
11	5 April 2014	Falmer Stadium, Brighton and Hove, England	Montenegro	2–0	9–0	2015 FIFA Women's World Cup qualification
12	5 April 2014	Falmer Stadium, Brighton and Hove, England	Montenegro	8–0	9–0	2015 FIFA Women's World Cup qualification
13	17 September 2014	Stadion Pod Malim Brdom, Petrovac, Montenegro	Montenegro	6–0	10–0	2015 FIFA Women's World Cup qualification
14	17 September 2014	Stadion Pod Malim Brdom, Petrovac, Montenegro	Montenegro	10–0	10–0	2015 FIFA Women's World Cup qualification
15	6 March 2016	Nissan Stadium, Nashville (TN), United States	Germany	1–0	1–2	2016 SheBelieves Cup
16	19 July 2017	Stadion Galgenwaard, Utrecht, Netherlands	Scotland	6–0	6–0	UEFA Women's Euros 2017
17	27 July 2017	Koning Willem II Stadion, Tilburg, Netherlands	Portugal	1–0	2–1	UEFA Women's Euros 2017
18	19 September 2017	Prenton Park, Birkenhead, England	Russia	5–0	6–0	2019 FIFA Women's World Cup qualification
19	19 September 2017	Prenton Park, Birkenhead, England	Russia	6–0	6–0	2019 FIFA Women's World Cup qualification
20	1 March 2018	Mapfre Stadium, Columbus (OH), United States	France	1–0	4–1	2018 SheBelieves Cup
21	10 April 2018	Bosnia and Herzegovina FA Training Centre, Sarajevo, Bosnia and Herzegovina	Bosnia and Herzegovina	1–0	2–0	2019 FIFA Women's World Cup qualification
22	31 August 2018	Rodney Parade, Newport, Wales	Wales	1–0	3–0	2019 FIFA Women's World Cup qualification

== Honours ==
Everton

- FA Women's League Cup: 2007–08
- FA Women's Cup: 2009–10

Manchester City

- FA Women's League Cup: 2014, 2016
- FA WSL: 2016
- Women's FA Cup: 2016–17

Barcelona

- Copa de la Reina: 2018
- Copa Catalunya: 2018, 2017
- UEFA Women's Champions League runner-up: 2018–19

Atlético Madrid

- Supercopa de España Femenina: 2020-21

England

- FIFA Women's World Cup third place: 2015
- SheBelieves Cup: 2019
