= Mo Marley =

English footballer and manager

Mo Marley MBE
Personal information
- Full name: Maureen Angela Marley
- Date of birth: 31 January 1967 (age 59)
- Place of birth: Liverpool, England
- Position: Defender

Youth career
- Daresbury

Senior career*
Years	Team	Apps	(Gls)
1988–2002	Everton		

International career
1995–2001	England	41	(1)

Managerial career
- 2001–2017: England (U-19 women)
- 2002–2012: Everton
- 2017–2018: England (women) (interim)
- 2018–2020: England (U-21 women)
- 2021–: England (U-23 women)
- * Club domestic league appearances and goals

Maureen Angela "Mo" Marley MBE (née Mallon; born 31 January 1967) is an English football manager and former player. She most recently managed the England women's national under-21 football team. As a player, Marley was a centre back, who captained both the England women's national football team and Everton, turning out 41 times for England between 1995 and 2001.

Marley had a 24-year association with Everton, joining the club in their former incarnation as Leasowe Pacific in 1988. She won the 1989 Women's FA Cup and captained the team to the FA Women's Premier League title in 1997–98. After taking over as manager in 2002 — sacking her husband to do so — she led Everton to the 2008 FA Women's Premier League Cup and the 2010 FA Women's Cup. Marley led Everton into the UEFA Women's Champions League on three occasions, before standing down as manager in October 2012. After a three year spell as England U-21 women's manager she is currently the Under 23 side head.

== Playing career ==
=== Club career ===
Marley joined Everton Ladies, then named Leasowe Pacific, in the 1987–88 season. She helped the club win the 1989 Women's FA Cup and went on to captain the side.

=== International career ===
Marley made her England senior debut, aged 28, against Italy in November 1995. She went on to captain the side, including during the 2001 European Championships, after which she retired from international football with 41 caps. Marley scored one goal for England, a header in a 6–0 friendly win over Scotland at Bramall Lane in March 1997.

Marley was allotted 109 when the FA announced their legacy numbers scheme to honour the 50th anniversary of England’s inaugural international.

== Coaching career ==
Marley stopped playing and took over as manager of Everton Ladies in the 2002 close season, having previously been the Girls and Women's Football Development Officer for Merseyside. She had taken up her role as head coach of England Under-19s in November 2001, while still playing for Everton. She guided Everton to their FA Women's Premier League Cup win in 2008 and FA Women's Cup win in 2010.

Marley became only the second woman in England, after Hope Powell, to be awarded the UEFA Pro Licence. She completed the course in 2007–08, alongside Roy Keane.

In July 2009, she coached the England Under-19s side to victory in the Uefa Women's Under-19 Championship. Marley stood down as Everton manager in October 2012, to focus on her job at the Football Association (FA).

In September 2017, she was named as the interim manager of the England women's national football team. In October 2018, she was appointed the permanent manager of the newly resurrected England under-21 women's team She stood down from the role in October 2020, taking on the under 23 role the same month the next year.

== Personal life ==
Marley's husband, Keith, was the manager of the Everton Ladies’ side from 1998 to 2002. In the 2005 Birthday Honours, she was appointed a Member of the Order of the British Empire (MBE) for services to sport.

== Honours ==
=== Player ===
Everton Ladies

- FA Women's Cup (1): 1988–89
- FA Women's Premier League (1): 1997-98

=== Manager ===
Everton Ladies

- FA Women's Premier League Cup (1): 2007–08
- FA Women's Cup (1): 2009-10

England

- UEFA Women's Under-19 Championship: 2009, Runner-up 2010, 2013
