= 2009–10 FA Women's Cup =

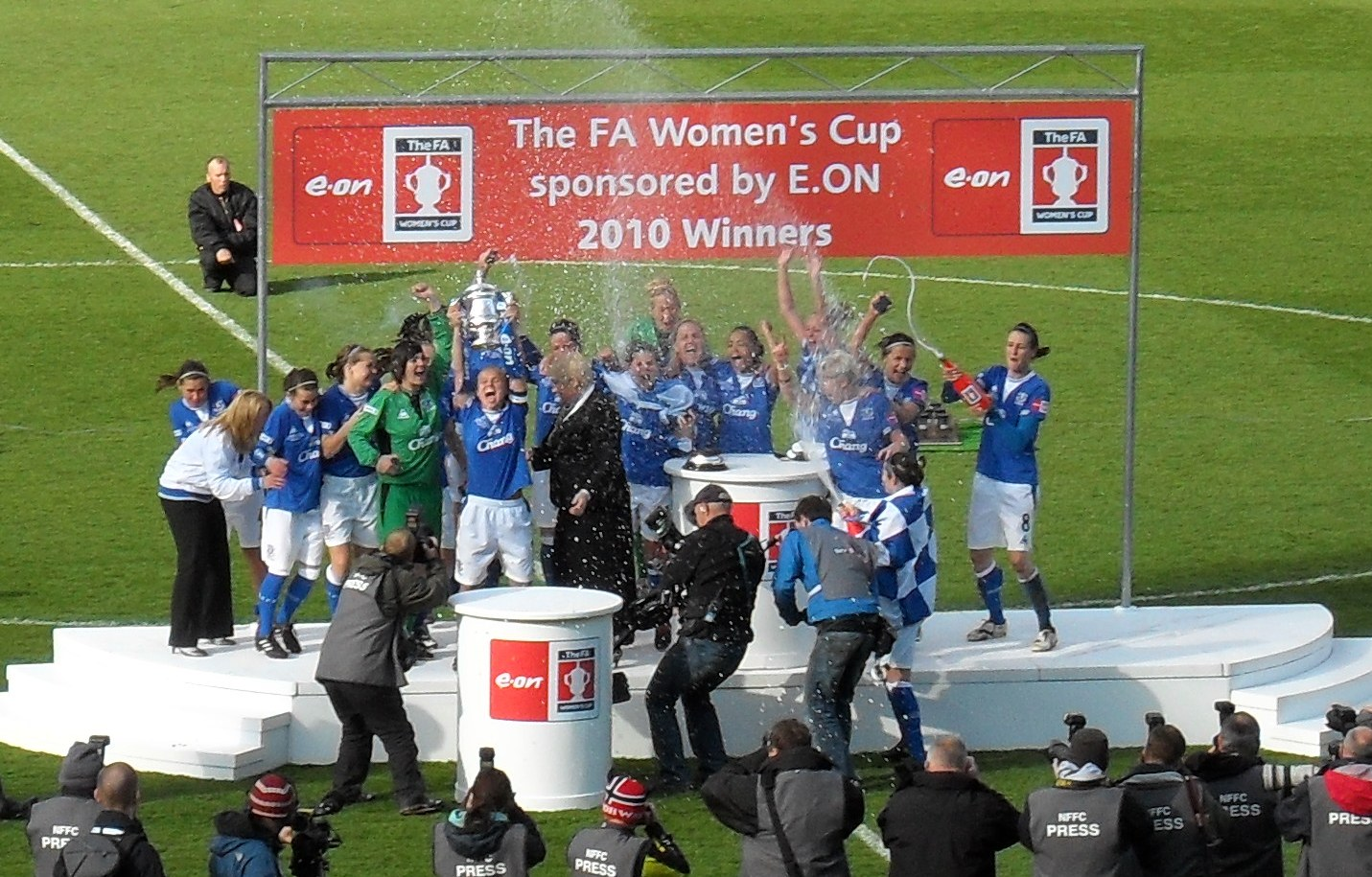
- Everton celebrate winning the 2010 FA Women's Cup final

Tournament details
- Country: England; Wales
- Teams: 245

Final positions
- Champions: Everton
- Runners-up: Arsenal

Tournament statistics
- Matches played: 235
- Goals scored: 1,097 (4.67 per match)
- Penalty shoot-outs do not count towards the total number of goals.

The 2009–10 FA Women's Cup was an association football knockout tournament for women's teams, held between 13 September 2009 and 3 May 2010. It was the 40th season of the FA Women's Cup and was won by Everton, who defeated Arsenal in the final. The tournament consisted of a preliminary round, four qualifying rounds and eight rounds of competition proper.

The competition began on 13 September 2009 when the 24 lowest-ranked teams in the tournament took part in the preliminary round, however only eleven games were played due to the withdrawal of Stokesley, allowing Forest Hall YPC to progress to first qualifying round.

All match results and dates from the Football Association website.

== Teams ==
A total of 245 teams had their entries to the tournament accepted by The Football Association. Twenty-four teams entered at the preliminary round stage, while a further 140 joined entered at first round qualifying. Teams that played in the four regional Combination leagues (South West, South East, Midland and Northern) were given an exemption to the first round proper, while teams in the FA Women's Premier League Northern Division and FA Women's Premier League Southern Division entered at the third round stage. Teams in the FA Women's Premier League National Division, which at the time was the top flight of women's football in England, were given byes to the fourth round.

Round	Previous round winners	Entered at this stage	Total entries	Games played	Goals scored	Prize money
Preliminary round	–	24	24	11	64	£75
First round qualifying	12	140	152	72	327	£100
Second round qualifying	76	–	76	38	196	£150
Third round qualifying	38	–	38	19	97	£200
First round	19	45	64	28	137	£250
Second round	32	–	32	16	63	£350
Third round	16	24	40	20	82	£500
Fourth round	20	12	32	16	73	£600
Fifth round	16	–	16	8	27	£750
Sixth round	8	–	8	4	20	£1,250
Semi-finals	4	–	4	2	6	£2,500
Final	2	–	2	1	5	£1,000 (runners-up) £5,000 (winners)

== Preliminary round ==
All games were played on 13 September 2009.

Tie	Home team (tier)	Score	Away team (tier)	Att.
1	Forest Hall YPC	H–W	Stokesley	
Tie awarded to Forest Hall, Stokesley withdrew from competition
2	Newcastle Medics	0–9	Gateshead Rutherford Ravens	
3	Prudhoe Town	1–3	Tynedale	
4	Gateshead Cleveland Hall	0–7	North Shields	
5	Accrington Girls & Ladies	0–1	Harraby Catholic Club	
6	Dearne & District	2–1	Brighouse Town	
7	Tipton Town	16–0	Stourport Swifts	
8	Woodford United	0–4	Brackley Sports	
9	Saffron Walden Town	1–5	C&K Basildon	
10	Runwell Hospital	2–1	Hutton	
11	Eastleigh	5–0	Parley Sports	
12	Christchurch	3–3 (4–1 p)	New Forest	

== First round qualifying ==
All games were played on 27 September 2009.

Tie	Home team (tier)	Score	Away team (tier)	Att.
1	Gateshead Rutherford Ravens	0–3	Birtley Town	
2	Forest Hall	1–5	North Shields	
3	Whitley Bay	7–0	Redcar Athletic	
4	Tynedale	3–0	Brandon United	
5	Blyth Spartans	A–W	Peterlee RA	
Tie awarded to Peterlee RA. Blyth Spartans withdrew from competition.
6	Abbeytown	1–2 (a.e.t.)	Warrington Town	
7	Birkenhead	2–3	Middleton Athletic	
8	Whitehaven	3–1	Bury Girls & Ladies	
9	Chester City	0–2	Wigan Athletic	
10	Harraby Catholic Club	1–0	Dalton Girls & Ladies	
11	Bolton Wanderers	10–1	Preston Rangers	
12	Barnsley	1–2 (a.e.t.)	Hull City	
13	Dearne & District	3–1	Huddersfield Town	
14	Steel City Wanderers	2–0	Sheffield United Junior Blades	
15	Guiseley AFC Vixens	1–2	Sheffield	
16	Keighley	1–5	Sheffield United Community	
17	Rolls-Royce Leisure	2–1	Market Warsop	
18	Mansfield Town	2–1	Peterborough Sports	
19	Sandiacre Town	4–0	Retford United	
20	Friar Lane & Epworth	2–4	Long Eaton United	
21	Peterborough Northern Star	5–0	West Bridgford	
22	Hinckley United	1–4	Loughborough Students	
23	Huntingdon Town	1–2	Oadby & Wigston	
24	Linby CW	1–7	Shepshed Dynamo	
25	Hereford Phoenix	5–0	Cottage Farm Rangers	
26	Tipton Town	0–4	Southam United	
27	Leamington Lions	3–1	Cannock	
28	Hereford Pegasus	3–2	Allscott	
29	Worcester City	0–1 (a.e.t.)	Stratford Town	
30	Crusaders	A–W	Coventry Ladies Development	
Tie awarded to Coventry Ladies Development. Crusaders removed from competition.
31	Lichfield Diamonds	1–6	Dudley United	
32	Haverhill Rovers	1–0	Stalham Town	
33	Cambridge University	1–2	Fakenham Town	
34	Bungay Town	0–9	Woodbridge Town	
35	AFC Kempston Rovers	3–0	Raunds Town	
36	Daventry Town	1–3	Corby S&L	
37	Bedford	7–0	Cogenhoe & Kingsthorpe	
38	Leighton Linslade	3–0	Baldock	

Tie	Home team (tier)	Score	Away team (tier)	Att.
39	Brackley Sports	0–3	Arlesey Town	
40	Kettering Town	3–0	Hitchin Hearts	
41	London Colney	A–W	Brentwood Town	
Tie awarded to Brentwood Town. London Colney withdrew from competition.
42	C&K Basildon	0–5	Barking	
43	Royston Town	1–2	Braintree Town	
44	Hemel Hempstead Town	3–2	Billericay Town	
45	Tring Athletic	2–1	Stevenage	
46	Runwell Hospital	2–5	Chelmsford City	
47	Sawbridgeworth Town	2–1	Garston	
48	Haringey Borough	4–1	Wandgas	
49	Mauritius Sports Association	4–1	Manford Way	
50	Leyton	0–4	Panthers	
51	Tower Hamlets	3–0	Westfield	
52	AFC Wimbledon	3–1	Dorking	
53	Old Actonians	2–1	Denham United	
54	Ashford Girls	5–1	Crowborough Athletic	
55	Rottingdean Village	0–2	Canterbury City	
56	Ramsgate	0–9	Maidstone Town	
57	Bexhill United	0–3	Haywards Heath Town	
58	Eastbourne Town	5–1	London Corinthians	
59	Aldershot Town	1–0	Southampton Saints	
60	Crawley Wasps	3–0	Chichester City	
61	BTC Southampton	A–W	Shanklin	
Tie awarded to Shanklin. BTC Southampton withdrew from competition.
62	Southampton	1–5	University of Portsmouth	
63	Eastleigh	0–5	Basingstoke Town	
64	East Preston	2–1	New Forest	
65	Bracknell Town	3–0	Cheltenham Town	
66	Wycombe Wanderers	4–1	Forest of Dean	
67	Chippenham Town	3–6	Stoke Lane Athletic	
68	Stony Stratford Town	5–4	Reading Girls	
69	MK Wanderers	0–3	Oxford United	
70	Launton	4–1	Marlow	
71	Maidenhead United	14–0	Banbury United	
72	Beaconsfield SYCOB	9–0	Newent Town	
73	Reading	1–3	Swindon Supermarine	
74	Poole Town	0–6	Keynsham Town Development	
75	Launceston	0–2	Marine Academy Plymouth	
76	Frome Town	2–0	Weymouth	

== Second round qualifying ==
All games were played on 11 October 2009.

Tie	Home team (tier)	Score	Away team (tier)	Att.
1	Birtley Town	2–10	Whitley Bay	
2	Tynedale	0–2	Peterlee RA	
3	North Shields	1–5	Harraby Catholic Club	
4	Warrington Town	0–8	Hull City	
5	Bolton Wanderers	3–1	Dearne & District	
6	Sheffield	11–0	Middleton Athletic	
7	Whitehaven	0–2	Wigan Athletic	
8	Sheffield United Community	3–1	Steel City Wanderers	
9	Peterborough Northern Star	2–1	Rolls-Royce Leisure	
10	Shepshed Dynamo	1–3	Loughborough Students	
11	Sandiacre Town	3–0	Mansfield Town	
12	Long Eaton United	4–1	Oadby & Wigston	
13	Stratford Town	1–3	Hereford Phoenix	
14	Corby S&L	4–0	Coventry Ladies Development	
15	Leamington Lions	3–0	Southam United	
16	Hereford Pegasus	2–5	Dudley United	
17	Bedford	3–0	Haverhill Rovers	
18	Kettering Town	2–1	Leyton Linslade	
19	Woodbridge Town	3–0	Fakenham Town	

Tie	Home team (tier)	Score	Away team (tier)	Att.
20	AFC Kempston Rovers	1–3	Arlesey Town	
21	Brentwood Town	1–4	Chelmsford City	
22	Tring Athletic	2–3 (a.e.t.)	Sawbridgeworth Town	
23	Mauritius Sports Association	2–6	Barking	
24	Braintree Town	4–3	Hemel Hempstead Town	
25	Panthers	3–4	Haringey Borough	
26	Tower Hamlets	1–3	Maidstone Town	
27	Canterbury City	2–3	Haywards Heath Town	
28	Aldershot Town	5–0	AFC Wimbledon	
29	Old Actonians	6–0	Ashford Girls	
30	Crawley Wasps	1–2	Eastbourne Town	
31	Launton	1–4	Wycombe Wanderers	
32	Shanklin	5–0	Bracknell Town	
33	University of Portsmouth	3–2	Basingstoke Town	
34	Oxford United	7–1	Stony Stratford Town	
35	East Preston	3–2 (a.e.t.)	Maidenhead United	
36	Beaconsfield SYCOB	8–3	Stoke Lane Athletic	
37	Keynsham Town Development	2–4	Swindon Supermarine	
38	Frome Town	0–1	Marine Academy Plymouth	

== Third round qualifying ==
All games were played on 25 October 2009, with the exception of the Harraby Catholic Club v Hull City tie, which was played on 8 November in Hull after twice having been postponed.

Tie	Home team (tier)	Score	Away team (tier)	Att.
1	Sheffield	1–2	Whitley Bay	
2	Wigan Athletic	2–6	Peterlee RA	
3	Hull City	12–1	Harraby Cotholic Club	
4	Bolton Wanderers	0–7	Sheffield United Community	
5	Long Eaton United	2–0	Peterborough Northern Star	
6	Leamington Lions	4–1 (a.e.t.)	Corby S&L	
7	Hereford Phoenix	3–5	Loughborough Students	
8	Dudley United	2–1	Sandiacre Town	
9	Woodbridge Town	3–3 (8–7 p)	Chelmsford City	
10	Braintree Town	0–3	Sawbridgeworth Town	
11	Kettering Town	1–5	Barking	
12	Bedford	2–1	Arlesey Town	
13	Aldershot Town	3–5	Old Actonians	
14	Haywards Heath Town	1–2	Maidstone Town	
15	Haringey Borough	2–1	Eastbourne Town	
16	Wycombe Wanderers	1–7	East Preston	
17	Beaconsfield SYCOB	0–5	Swindon Supermarine	
18	Shanklin	1–0	Oxford United	
19	Marine Academy Plymouth	2–0	University of Portsmouth	

== First round proper ==
All games were originally scheduled for 8 November 2009. The tie between Cullompton Rangers and Forest Green Rovers was postponed four times, before Cullompton withdrew from the competition, allowing Forest Green to progress to the next round.

Tie	Home team (tier)	Score	Away team (tier)	Att.
1	Liverpool Feds	4–0	Peterlee RA	
2	Salford	H–W	Darlington RA	
Tie awarded to Salford. Darlington RA withdrew.
3	Stockport County	3–1	Bradford City	
4	Whitley Bay	7–1	Blackpool Wren Rovers	
5	Hull City	0–9	Rochdale	
6	Tranmere Rovers	1–6	Rotherham United	
7	Sheffield United Community	1–2	Middlesbrough	
8	South Durham & Cestria	1–2	Wakefield	
9	Wolverhampton Wanderers	1–3	Sporting Club Albion	
10	Stoke City	5–4 (a.e.t.)	Loughborough Students	
11	Long Eaton United	0–2	Coventry City	
12	Leafield Athletic	8–0	Leamington Lions	
13	Copsewood Coventry	7–1	Scunthorpe United	
14	Leicester City Ladies	2–3 (a.e.t.)	Loughborough Foxes	
15	Dudley United	2–1	The New Saints	
16	Haringey Borough	3–1	Barking	

Tie	Home team (tier)	Score	Away team (tier)	Att.
17	Enfield Town	3–1	Maidstone Town	
18	Tottenham Hotspur	0–1	Northampton Town	
19	East Preston	2–1 (a.e.t.)	Ebbsfleet United	
20	Cambridge	5–0	Sawbridgeworth Town	
21	Milton Keynes Dons	3–0	Old Actonians	
22	Gillingham	6–0	Oxford City	
23	Lewes	5–2	Ipswich Town	
24	Dagenham & Redbridge	A–W	Norwich City	
Tie awarded to Norwich City. Dagenham & Redbridge withdrew.
25	Welwyn Garden City	A–W	Woodbridge Town	
Tie awarded to Woodbridge Town. Welwyn Garden City withdrew.
26	Bedford	0–3	Chesham United	
27	Shanklin	0–2	Havant & Waterlooville	
28	Swindon Supermarine	1–5	Plymouth Argyle	
29	Yeovil Town	3–0	Marine Academy Plymouth	
30	Cullompton Rangers	A–W	Forest Green Rovers	
Tie awarded to Forest Green Rovers. Cullompton Rangers withdrew.
31	Swindon Town	3–2	Winscombe	
32	Reading Town	1–7	Newquay	

== Second round proper ==
All games were originally scheduled for 29 November 2009.

Tie	Home team (tier)	Score	Away team (tier)	Att.
1	Whitley Bay	2–3	Rochdale	
2	Middlesbrough	2–0	Salford	
3	Liverpool Feds	3–2	Rotherham United	
4	Stockport County	1–0	Wakefield	
5	Coventry City	7–0	Leafield Athletic	
6	Sporting Club Albion	4–1	Loughborough Foxes	
7	Copsewood Coventry	2–3	Stoke City	
8	Cambridge	2–1 (a.e.t.)	Dudley United	
9	Chesham United	1–3	Norwich City	
10	Lewes	5–1	Haringey Borough	
11	Woodbridge Town	0–1	East Preston	
12	Enfield Town	0–3	Gillingham	
13	Milton Keynes Dons	2–0	Northampton Town	
14	Newquay	2–0	Swindon Town	
15	Havant & Waterlooville	5–2	Plymouth Argyle	
16	Yeovil Town	4–1	Forest Green Rovers	

== Third round proper ==
All games were originally scheduled for 13 December 2009.

Tie	Home team (tier)	Score	Away team (tier)	Att.
1	Liverpool Feds	1–0	Rochdale	
2	Liverpool	4–1	Preston North End	
3	Sheffield Wednesday	5–2	Stockport County	
4	Middlesbrough	1–2	Curzon Ashton	
5	Leeds City Vixens	1–0	Manchester City	
6	OOH Lincoln	2–2 (a.e.t.)	Newcastle United	
7	Aston Villa	3–2	Sporting Club Albion	
8	Stoke City	2–6	Leicester City	
9	Cambridge	1–4 (a.e.t.)	Luton Town	
10	Coventry City	1–4	Derby County	
11	Reading	1–0	Brighton & Hove Albion	
12	Charlton Athletic	0–3	West Ham United	
13	Gillingham	1–4	Barnet	
14	Lewes	0–5	Queens Park Rangers	
15	Crystal Palace	0–0 (5–4 p)	Fulham	
16	Norwich City	5–2	Milton Keynes Dons	
17	Colchester United	4–0	East Preston	
18	Newquay	1–3	Yeovil Town	
19	Keynsham Town	2–3	Portsmouth	
20	Cardiff City	1–2	Havant & Waterlooville	

== Fourth round proper ==
All games were played on 17, 24 or 31 January, or 7 February 2010.

17 January 2010	Arsenal (1)	4–1 (a.e.t.)	Sunderland (1)	Borehamwood
	Chapman 66'; K. Little 98', 99', 114'	Report	Grant 90+4' (o.g.)	Stadium: Meadow Park; Attendance: 157

17 January 2010	Leicester City (2)	0–3	Millwall Lionesses (1)	Blaby
		Report	Boardman 44'; Heatherson 46', 55'	Stadium: Leicestershire Scout HQ

17 January 2010	OOH Lincoln (2)	3–1	Sheffield Wednesday (2)	Lincoln
	Michalska 57'; L. Little 72', 76'	Report	Skeemer	Stadium: Ashby Avenue; Attendance: 76; Referee: Rob Ellis

24 January 2010	Bristol Academy (1)	1–2	West Ham United (2)	Patchway
	McCatty	Report	Downham	Stadium: Scott Park

24 January 2010	Nottingham Forest (1)	3–2	Leeds City Vixens (2)	Gedling
	Gilliatt; Lawson (pen.); Bell	Report	Robinson; Daniel	Stadium: Bill Stokeld Stadium

24 January 2010	Everton (1)	6–2	Queens Park Rangers (2)	Crosby
	Scott; Unitt; Hinnigan; F. Williams; Harries	Report	Albert; Curtis	Stadium: Rossett Park

24 January 2010	Fulham (2)	0–6	Blackburn Rovers (1)	Ruislip
		Report	Twohig; Anderton; Preston; Ward; Shepherd; Kane	Stadium: Middlesex Stadium

24 January 2010	Leeds Carnegie (1)	4–1	Watford (1)	Farsley
	S. Smith; E. White; Cantrell; Owen	Report	Owen	Stadium: Throstle Nest

24 January 2010	Reading (2)	1–1 (a.e.t.) (4–5 p)	Aston Villa (2)	Tadley
	Goal	Report	Goal	Stadium: Barlows Park
	Penalties
	Penalty scored Penalty missed		Penalty scored

31 January 2010	Birmingham City (1)	4–1	Derby County (2)	Tiddington
	Connor-Iommi; Rose; Saulter	Report	Abbey	Stadium: Knights Lane; Attendance: 44

31 January 2010	Doncaster Rovers Belles (1)	6–1	Havant & Waterlooville	Doncaster
	Exley; Bright; T. Williams; Hamilton; Weston; (o.g.)	Report	Wilson	Stadium: Keepmoat Stadium; Attendance: 60

7 February 2010	Liverpool (2)	1–2	Chelsea (1)	Skelmersdale
	K. Williams 34'	Report	Buet 88'; Stoney 115'	Stadium: Community Ground

7 February 2010	Norwich City (3)	3–1	Yeovil Town (3)	Blofield
	Goal	Report	Goal	Stadium: Plantation Park

7 February 2010	Liverpool Feds (3)	0–5	Curzon Ashton (2)	Heswall
		Report	Goal	Stadium: Gayton Park

== Fifth round proper ==
All games were played on 7 or 14 February 2010.

7 February 2010	Everton (1)	7–0	Portsmouth (2)	Crosby
	Duggan; Scott; Dowie; F. Williams; Handley	Report		Stadium: Rossett Park

7 February 2010	Arsenal (1)	3–2	Leeds Carnegie (2)	Borehamwood
	Beattie 15'; Ludlow 59'; Yankey 79'	Report	E. White 53'; Clarke 82'	Stadium: Meadow Park; Referee: Tim Robinson

7 February 2010	Birmingham City (1)	0–1	Doncaster Rovers Belles (2)	Tiddington
		Report	Exley (pen.)	Stadium: Knights Lane

7 February 2010	Blackburn Rovers (1)	1–0 (a.e.t.)	OOH Lincoln (2)	Radcliffe
	Anderton 118'	Report		Stadium: Stainton Park

7 February 2010	West Ham United (2)	2–3 (a.e.t.)	Barnet (2)	Purfleet
	Downham	Report	Sandow; Rudman; Thomas	Stadium: Ship Lane

14 February 2010	Chelsea (1)	3–1 (a.e.t.)	Millwall Lionesses (1)	Molesey
	Spence 16'; Susi 110'; Whitter 115'	Report	Heatherson 34'	Stadium: Imber Court; Referee: Kevin English

14 February 2010	Yeovil Town (3)	0–1	Nottingham Forest (1)	Somerton
		Report	Bell 63'	Stadium: Somerton Sports Ground; Attendance: 255

14 February 2010	Curzon Ashton (2)	1–2	Aston Villa (2)	Ashton-under-Lyne
	McLeod	Report	Farrow; Petrovic	Stadium: Tameside Stadium; Attendance: 80

== Quarter-finals ==
The games at Arsenal and Everton were played on their original scheduled date of 14 February. The ties at Aston Villa and Barnet, were scheduled to be played a week later, but snow and waterlogged pitch meant they were not played until 7 March.

7 March 2010	Aston Villa (2)	3–4 (a.e.t.)	Chelsea (1)	Boldmere
	Davies; Follis	Report	Susi 20', 35'; Champ 91' (pen.); Jane 106'	Stadium: Boldmere Community Stadium

7 March 2010	Barnet (2)	3–2	Nottingham Forest (1)	Perivale
	Sandow 20', 77'; Thomas 70'	Report	Coombs 60'; Rudman 72' (o.g.)	Stadium: Reynolds Field; Referee: T Donnellan

14 February 2010	Arsenal (1)	5–0	Doncaster Rovers Belles (1)	Borehamwood
14:00 BST	Yankey 6'; K. Little 38', 62', 80'; T. Williams 90' (o.g.)	Report		Stadium: Meadow Park; Attendance: 155; Referee: G. Sprague

14 February 2010	Everton (1)	2–1	Blackburn Rovers (1)	Crosby
	Duggan 32'; Handley 51'	Report	Sheen 9'	Stadium: Rossett Park; Referee: M Hancock

== Semi-finals ==
The game at Everton was played on 14 March, while Arsenal's tie at Chelsea took place on 4 April.

14 March 2010	Everton (1)	2–0	Barnet (2)	Southport
	Dowie 47'; F. Williams 86'	Report		Stadium: Haig Avenue; Attendance: 17,505

4 April 2010	Chelsea (1)	0–4	Arsenal (1)	Staines-upon-Thames
14:00 GMT		Report	Fleeting 34'; K. Little 36'; F. White 44'; Ludlow 64'	Stadium: Wheatsheaf Park; Attendance: 605

== Final ==
3 May 2010
15:00 BST

Arsenal	2–3 (a.e.t.)	Everton
K. Little 43' (pen.); Fleeting 54'	Report	Dowie 16', 119'; F. White 45+2' (o.g.)

City Ground, Nottingham
Attendance: 17,505
Referee: Una Hong (South Korea)
