= Nicola Hobbs =

English footballer

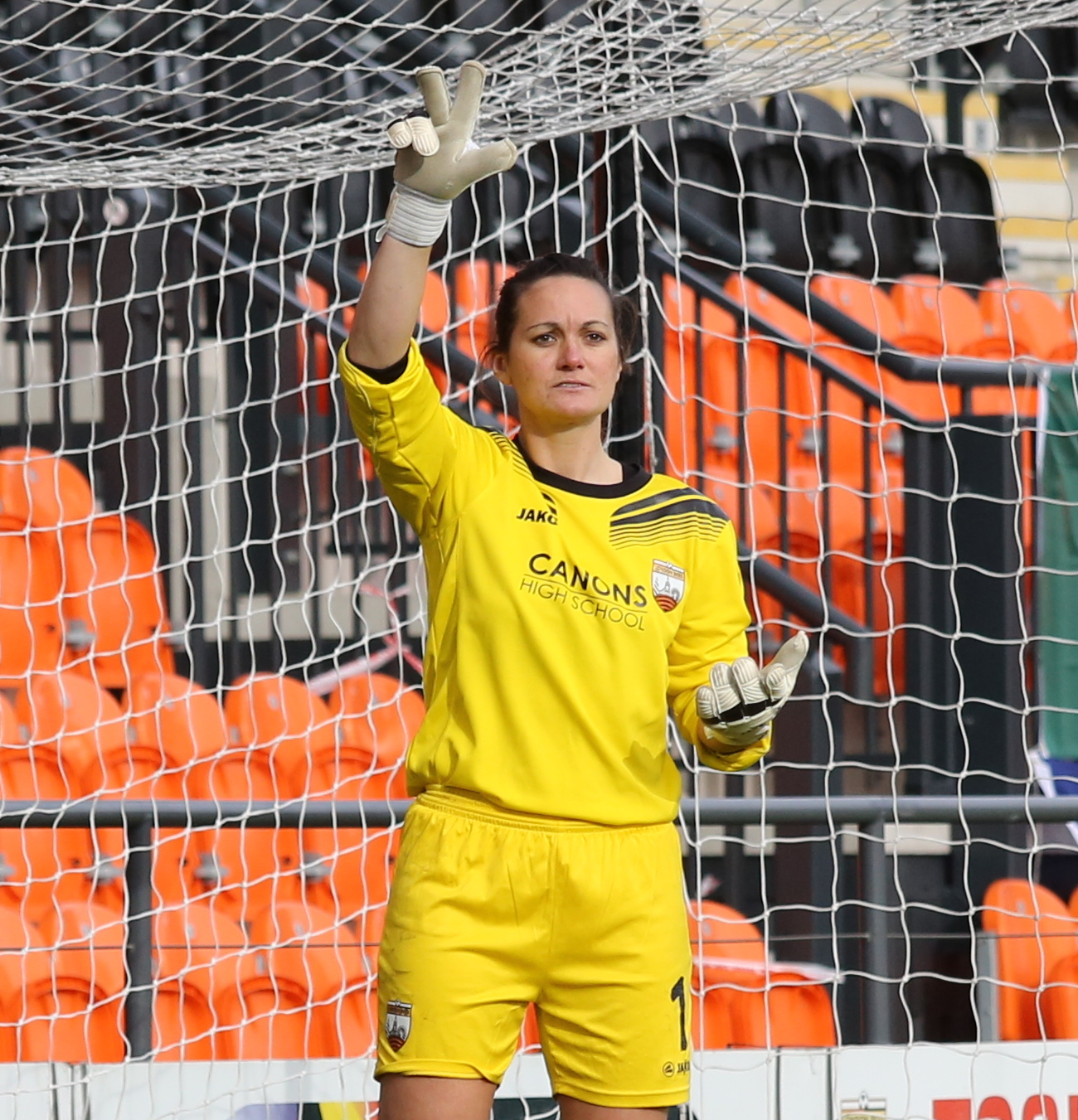
- Hobbs playing for London Bees in 2017

Personal information
- Full name: Nicola Hobbs
- Date of birth: 10 May 1987 (age 39)
- Place of birth: Portsmouth, England
- Position: Goalkeeper

Youth career
- Moulton Juniors
- Holbeach Girls

Senior career*
Years	Team	Apps	(Gls)
2002–2003	Norwich City		
2003–2007	Lincoln City		
2007–2008	Blackburn Rovers		
2008–2010	Doncaster Rovers Belles		
2010	Everton		
2011–2012	Lincoln Ladies	25	(0)
2013–2017	Doncaster Rovers Belles	16	(0)
2017–2018	London Bees	16	(0)
2018	Sheffield United	1	(0)
- * Club domestic league appearances and goals as of 20 November 2018

Nicola Hobbs (born 10 May 1987) is an English footballer who last signed as a goalkeeper for Sheffield United ahead of the 2018/2019 FA WSL 2 season. However, she left the club in October after finding it impossible to combine her work commitments and playing career. She had previously played for London Bees in the FA WSL 2, the Doncaster Rovers Belles, Lincoln Ladies, Everton, Blackburn Rovers, and Norwich City. She has represented England up to Under 23 level. Outside of football, she works full-time as a firefighter.

== Honours ==
=== Everton ===
- FA Women's Cup (1): 2009–10
