= Jill Scott (footballer) =

English footballer (born 1987)

Jill Scott MBE
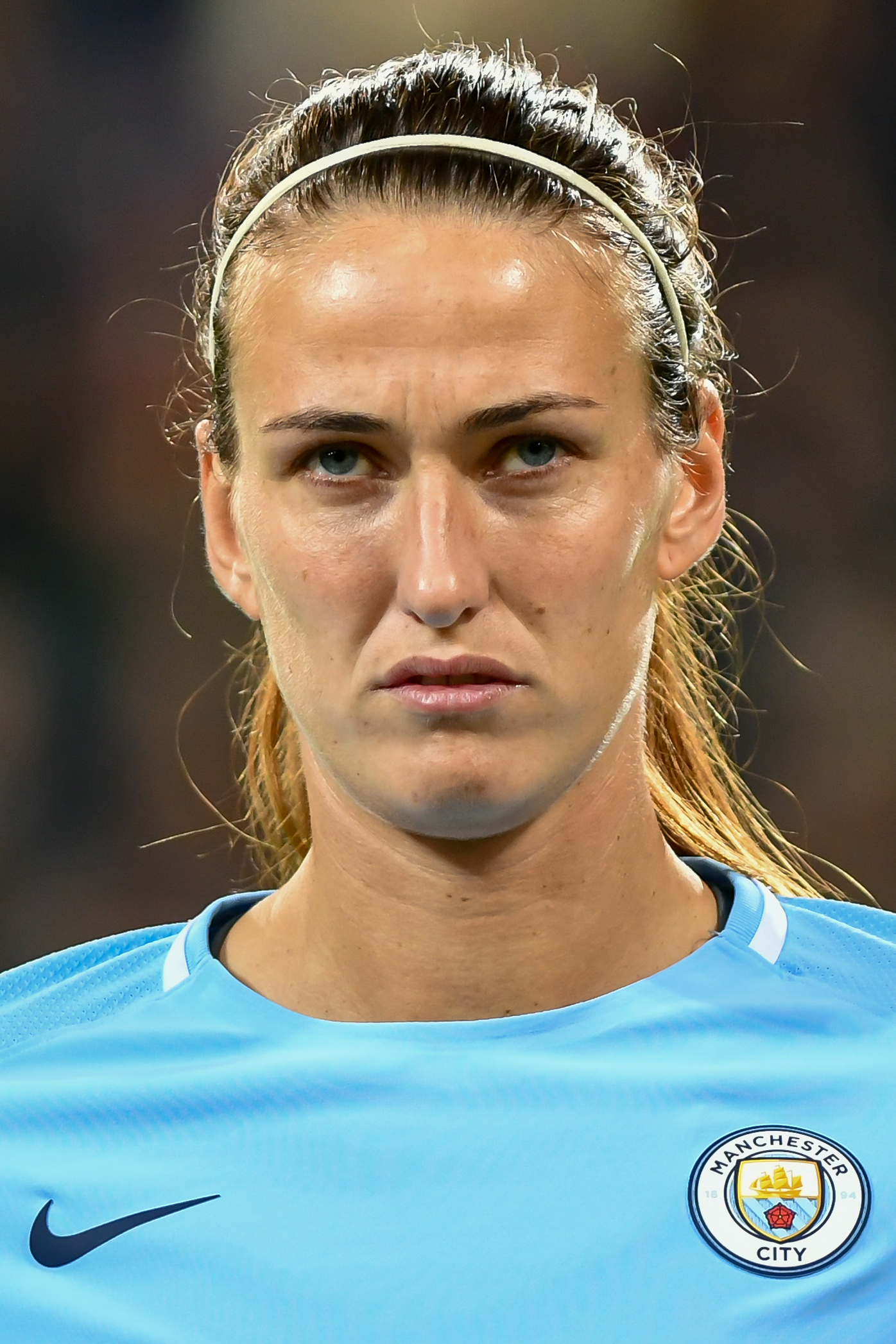
- Scott in 2017

Personal information
- Full name: Jill Louise Scott
- Date of birth: 2 February 1987 (age 39)
- Place of birth: Sunderland, England
- Height: 5 ft 11 in (1.81 m)
- Position: Midfielder

Youth career
- Boldon Girls

Senior career*
Years	Team	Apps	(Gls)
2004–2006	Sunderland		
2006–2013	Everton	114	(21)
2013–2022	Manchester City	111	(19)
2021	→ Everton (loan)	11	(2)
2022	→ Aston Villa (loan)	7	(0)
Total		243	(42)

International career
2006–2022	England	161	(26)
2012–2021	Great Britain	9	(1)
Medal record
Women's football
Representing England
UEFA Women's Championship
Winner	2022
Runner-up	2009
FIFA Women's World Cup
Bronze medal – third place	2015
- * Club domestic league appearances and goals

Jill Louise Scott (born 2 February 1987) is an English former professional footballer who played as a midfielder. The FIFA technical report into the 2011 FIFA Women's World Cup described Scott as one of England's four outstanding players; "[an] energetic, ball-winning midfielder who organises the team well, works hard at both ends of the pitch and can change her team's angle of attack."

At 5 feet 11 inches (1.81 m), Scott was nicknamed "Crouchy" after male international footballer Peter Crouch, who towered over his fellow players to a similar degree. After leaving hometown club Sunderland for Everton in 2006, she contributed to the Blues' FA Women's Premier League Cup win in 2008 and FA Women's Cup victory in 2010. With Manchester City, she won the FA WSL in 2016 and is a three-time winner of the FA Women's Cup and the FA WSL Cup. On the individual level, Scott was voted 2008 FA Players' Player of the Year.

Following her retirement from football in 2022, Scott went on to win the twenty-second series of I'm a Celebrity...Get Me Out of Here! and was crowned "Queen of the Jungle".

== Early life ==
Scott grew up in Fulwell, Sunderland, Tyne and Wear, and lived with parents Doreen and Bryan and three siblings, a sister Amanda who is seven years older, a brother Mark who is four years older, and a sister who is nine years younger. She attended Monkwearmouth Comprehensive School.

When Scott was five, she would go with her nine-year-old brother into the back lanes near their house and play football with him and his friends and Scott has commented that "...we spent all of our childhood just in the back lanes, so, if say Wimbledon was on I'd get a tennis racket from somewhere and we'd be playing tennis, if the ashes was on you'd suddenly get a cricket bat and you just went through every sport and event being in the back lanes." At the age of seven she was playing football in a boys team, and played for both a local team and a team at her school and was the only student in year 5 to be on the school football team.

A keen long-distance runner, Scott ran for Sunderland Harriers, winning the North of England Under-13 cross-country title and the Junior Great North Run and at the age of 13, she had to decide between football or running, and chose to concentrate on playing football.

Scott then began playing football for the Boldon CA girls' team in Tyne & Wear and later met future England teammates Steph Houghton and Demi Stokes who also played for Boldon. As part of the "Where Greatness Is Made" campaign, plaques honouring Stokes and Scott were installed at the club in 2022. When playing games for Boldon Scott needed to get lifts in a car to attend the games and when she was unable to get a lift, instead of missing the game she would let her mother know that her coach was picking her up at the end of the street and then she would catch a metro train to the location where the match was taking place. At the age of 14 she began playing for the Sunderland Women's team.

After leaving school in 2003, Scott received a BTEC National Diploma in Sport and Exercise Science at Gateshead College. She remained at the college to study for a University of Sunderland foundation degree in sports and exercise development. She also played for the college football team alongside fellow Sunderland and international teammate Carly Telford. After completing her diploma, both Scott and Telford enrolled at Loughborough University to study sport.

== Club career ==
=== Sunderland ===
Scott began her senior career with Sunderland Women and in October 2005, aged only 18 years, she won the Women's Player of the Month award for September, based on her performances for both her club and country (at under-19 level).

=== Everton ===
Scott joined Everton Ladies in July 2006, having turned down an approach from Doncaster Rovers Belles. Her first game for Everton came the following month, a 3–0 defeat against Arsenal Ladies in the FA Women's Community Shield.

At the end of the 2007–08 season, she picked up the FA Tesco Players' Player of the Year award. Also nominated were Arsenal's Alex Scott and Karen Carney. In April 2012, Scott was appointed as one of eight digital media ambassadors, one from each team, who wear their Twitter account name on their shirt sleeves to raise the profile of the WSL. Scott decided to leave Everton at the end of the 2013 season.

During her first spell at Everton, Scott won the FA Women's Premier League Cup and the FA Women's Cup, playing in both finals.

=== Manchester City ===
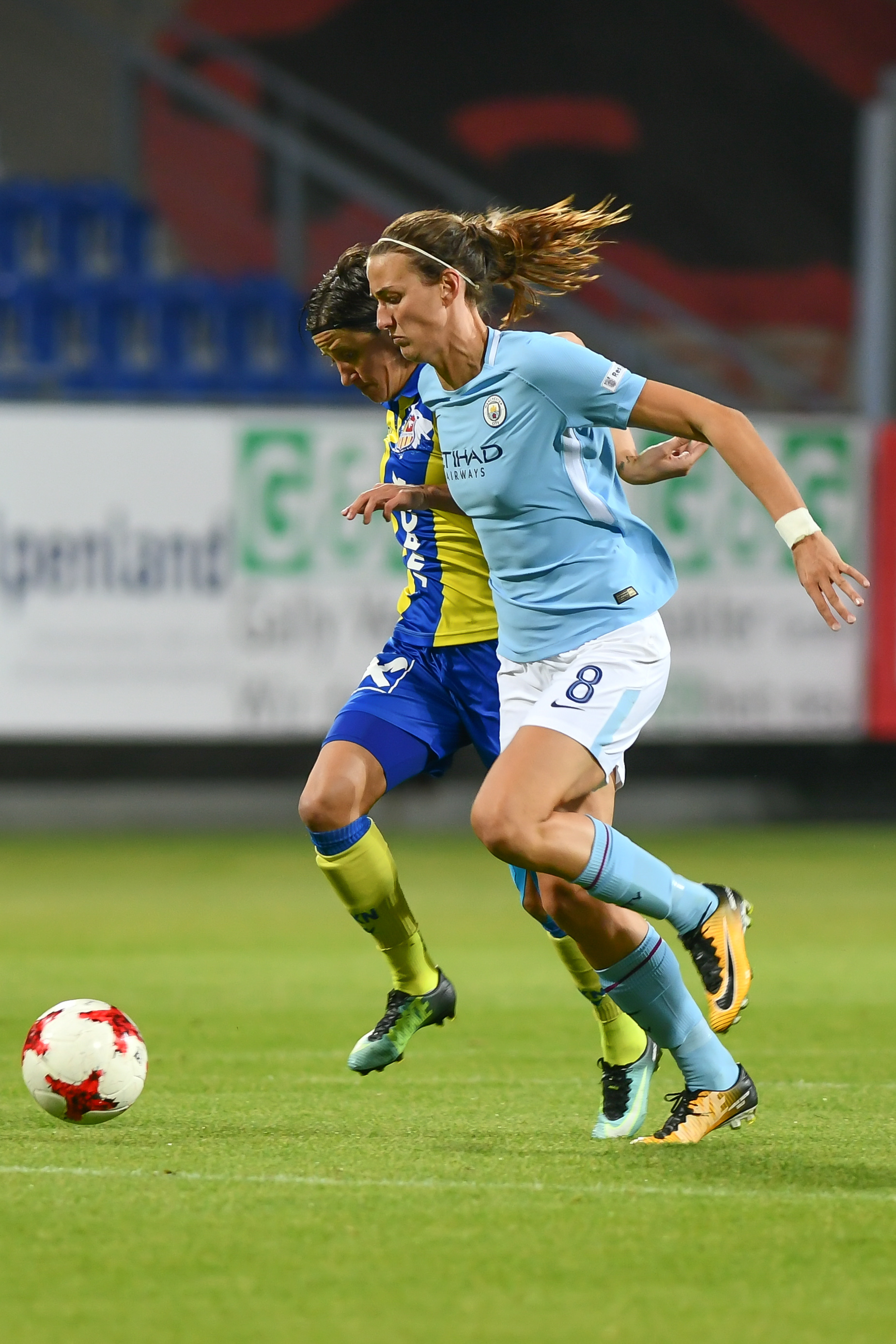
Scott playing for Manchester City in 2017

After leaving Everton, Scott signed a two-year deal with Manchester City. This move proved a success, as she played her part in securing the Continental Cup Trophy for Manchester City in 2014.

In April 2015, Scott was shown the red card and banned for three matches for headbutting Arsenal's Jade Bailey during Manchester City's 1–0 defeat. In the 2017 FA Cup Final, Scott scored in a 4–1 win against Birmingham City.

In June 2020, Scott signed a new two-year contract which saw her take up a coaching role at the club. At the 2020 Women's FA Community Shield on 29 August 2020, Scott was shown a red card for two bookable offences in Manchester City's scrappy 2–0 defeat by Chelsea at Wembley Stadium.

==== Return to Everton (loan) ====
On 21 January 2021, Scott returned to Everton on loan for the remainder of the 2020–21 season.

==== Aston Villa (loan) ====
On 25 January 2022, Scott signed for Aston Villa on loan until the end of the season.

On 23 August 2022, Scott announced her retirement from football.

== International career ==
=== England ===
At junior level, Scott played for the England Under-19s side, scoring three times in three games as England won through the first round of qualifying for the 2006 UEFA Under-19s tournament. Her first call-up to the England senior squad came in May 2006, having captained the Under-19s side for the previous 18 months. She made her debut for the England senior team against the Netherlands in August 2006, coming on as a late substitute for Kelly Smith in a 4–0 win. She made the squad for the 2007 World Cup, coming on as a substitute in England's opening match against Japan. She went on to start the remainder of England's matches in the tournament, scoring her first international goal in the 6–1 demolition of Argentina in the group stage. England bowed out at the quarter-final stage after a 3–0 defeat against the United States.

In May 2009, Scott was one of the first 17 female players to be given central contracts by The Football Association. She was named in coach Hope Powell's squad for the 2009 UEFA Women's European Championships, scoring a late winner as England beat the Netherlands in the semi-final, having come on as a substitute for Jessica Clarke at the beginning of extra-time.

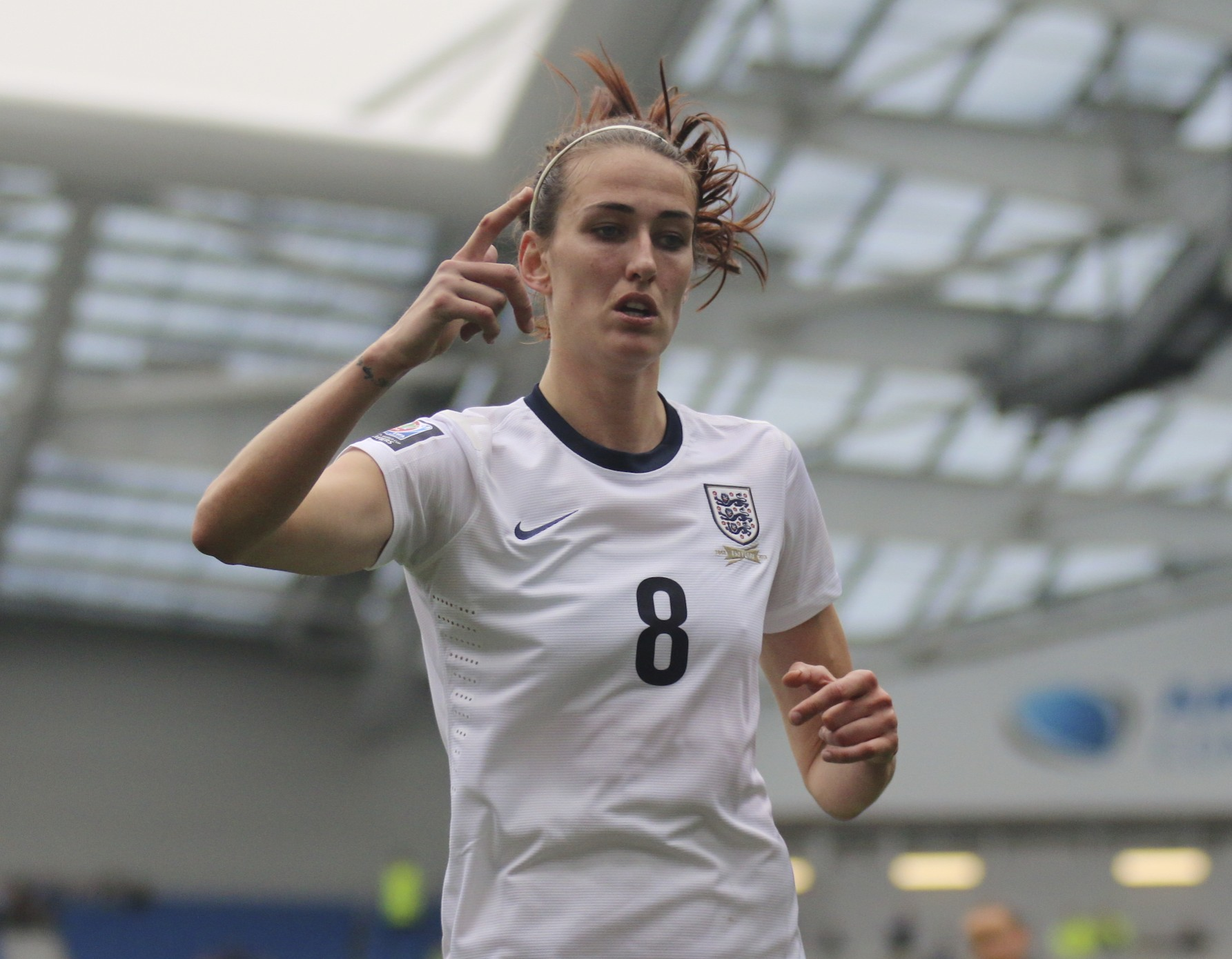
Scott playing for England against Montenegro in 2014

At the 2011 FIFA Women's World Cup, Scott scored against New Zealand in England's 2–1 group B win. She put England ahead against France in the quarter final, but did not take a penalty in her team's 3–4 shootout defeat following a 1–1 draw. In February 2019, Scott pulled out of the England squad for the SheBelieves Cup.

On 23 February 2021, Scott made her 150th appearance for the England team in a game against Northern Ireland, which she would captain and play the whole 90 minutes as England would win 6–0.

In June 2022, Scott was included in the England squad which won the UEFA Women's Euro 2022. On 23 August 2022, Scott announced her retirement from football, a day after England and Manchester City teammate Ellen White did. Scott retired as England's second-most capped international footballer (men and women), behind Fara Williams.

Scott was allotted 163 when the FA announced their legacy numbers scheme to honour the 50th anniversary of England's inaugural international.

=== Great Britain ===
In June 2012, Scott was named in an 18-player Great Britain squad for the 2012 London Olympics.

In 2021, Scott was announced as one of the 22-player squad for the 2020 Tokyo Olympics.

== Post-footballing career ==
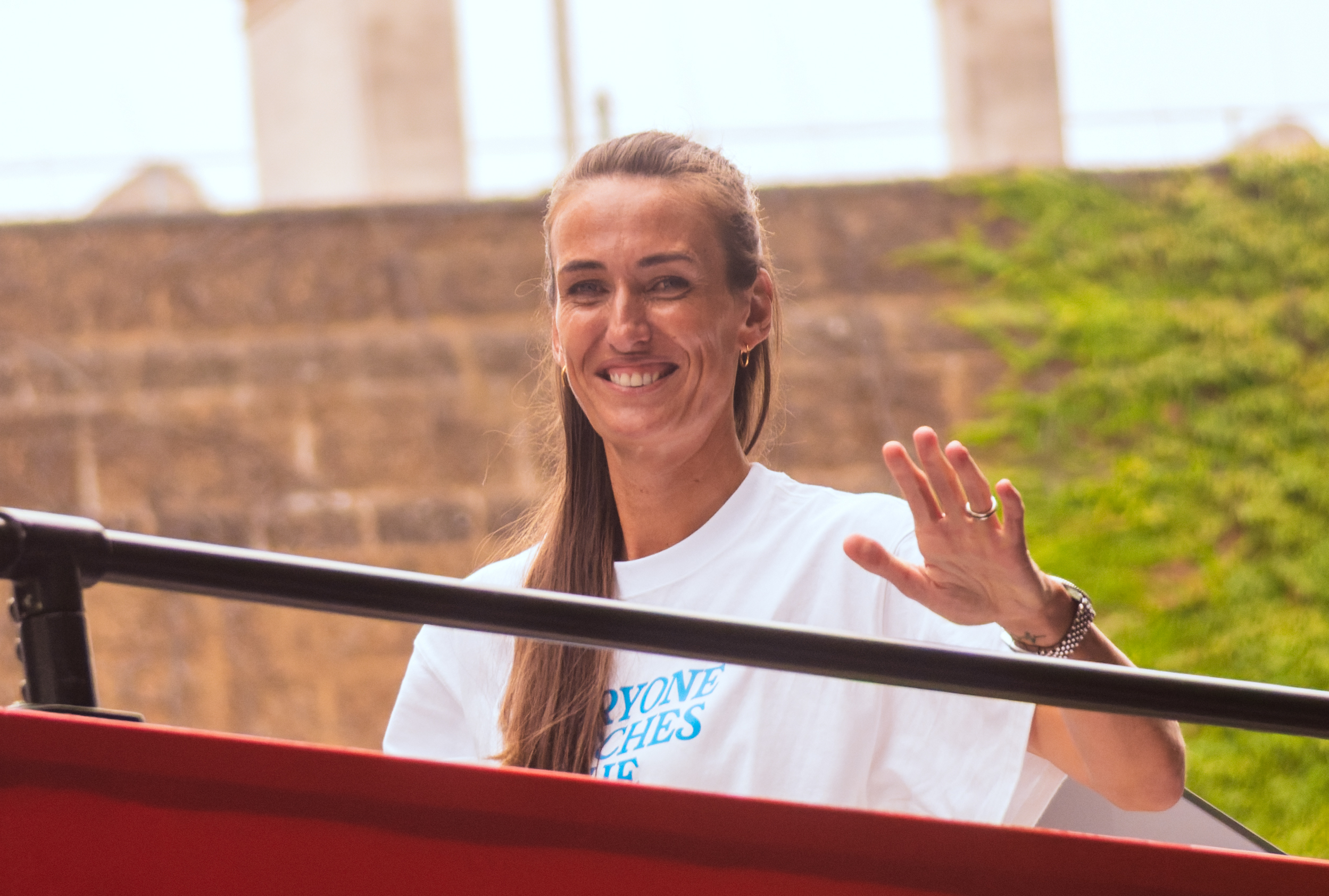
Scott supporting the England team that won the UEFA Women's Euro 2025 during their victory parade

In November 2022, Scott won the twenty-second series of I'm a Celebrity...Get Me Out of Here! and was crowned "Queen of the Jungle", becoming the first LGBTQ+ woman to win the show. Scott has appeared as a pundit for several Men's and Women's matches, including England Men's Euros qualifying games against Malta and North Macedonia, and the UEFA Women's Champions League final. In June 2023, she became the first female player to captain England for Soccer Aid.

In 2023 Scott became a captain in the panel show A League of Their Own.

In 2025, Scott launched a podcast with Karen Carney, called “Long Story Short”. She also served as a contestant on Taskmaster. In 2026, she appeared in an episode of Celebrity Sabotage.

In June 2026, Scott ran and cycled 388 miles (624 km) over 5 days, from Wembley Stadium in London to Sunderland's Stadium of Light, to raise money for charity; at least half of the money raised will support local Sport for Change projects, the rest going to Comic Relief's wider work.

In the fourth season of Ted Lasso that premiered in August 2026, Scott and Rebecca Lowe play themselves as commentators for fictional AFC Richmond's women's football games.

== Personal life ==
In March 2020, Scott announced her engagement to long-term partner Shelly Unitt, the younger sister of former footballer Rachel Unitt. Scott and Unitt own Boxx2Boxx Coffee, a coffee shop in Manchester.

Scott was appointed Member of the Order of the British Empire (MBE) in the 2020 New Year Honours for services to women's football.

== Coaching career ==
In September 2008, Scott was appointed as the coach of the Women's Football Academy at Gateshead College, with former Darlington manager Mick Tait taking over as coach of the Men's Academy.

== Career statistics ==
=== Club ===
Appearances and goals by club, season and competition
Club	Season	League			FA Cup		League Cup		Continental		Total	
Club	Season	Division	Apps	Goals	Apps	Goals	Apps	Goals	Apps	Goals	Apps	Goals
Sunderland	2004–05	FA WPL Northern							—			
Sunderland	2005–06	FA WPL National							—			
Sunderland	Total								—			
Everton	2006–07	FA WPL National							—			
Everton	2007–08	FA WPL National										
Everton	2008–09	FA WPL National							—			
Everton	2009–10	FA WPL National										
Everton	2011	FA WSL	13	1					—			
Everton	2012	FA WSL	14	0					—			
Everton	2013	FA WSL	14	1					—			
Everton	Total		41	2								
Manchester City	2014	FA WSL	14	4	2	0	7	1	—		23	5
Manchester City	2015	FA WSL	12	1	2	1	5	0	—		19	2
Manchester City	2016	FA WSL	14	3	2	0	3	1	2	1	21	5
Manchester City	2017	FA WSL	7	3	3	1	0	0	3	0	13	4
Manchester City	2017–18	FA WSL	17	7	3	0	6	0	8	1	34	8
Manchester City	2018–19	FA WSL	16	0	1	0	4	0	1	0	22	0
Manchester City	2019–20	FA WSL	16	0	0	0	0	0	3	0	19	0
Manchester City	2020–21	FA WSL	7	1	0	0	0	0	1	0	8	1
Manchester City	2021–22	FA WSL	8	0	0	0	0	0	0	0	8	0
Manchester City	Total		111	19	13	2	25	2	18	2	165	25
Everton (loan)	2020–21	FA WSL	11	2	0	0	0	0	0	0	11	2
Aston Villa (loan)	2021–22	FA WSL	0	0	0	0	0	0	0	0	0	0
Career total												

=== International ===
Year	England		Great Britain	
Year	Apps	Goals	Apps	Goals
2006	2	1	—N/a	
2007	11	1	—N/a	
2008	6	2	—N/a	
2009	11	1	—N/a	
2010	11	1	—N/a	
2011	11	3	—N/a	
2012	8	3	3	1
2013	14	0	—N/a	
2014	11	1	—N/a	
2015	17	2	—N/a	
2016	12	3	—N/a	
2017	12	0	—N/a	
2018	6	?	—N/a	
2019	14	3	—N/a	
2020	3	2	—N/a	
2021	?	0	3	0
2022	4	1	—N/a	
Total	161	27	6	1

Scores and results list England or Great Britain's goal tally first, score column indicates score after each Scott goal.

List of international goals scored by Jill Scott
No.	Date	Venue	Opponent	Score	Result	Competition
Goals for England
1	25 October 2006	Städtisches Waldstadion, Aalen, Germany	Germany		1–5	Friendly
2	17 September 2007	Chengdu Longquanyi Football Stadium, Chengdu, China	Argentina		6–1	2007 FIFA World Cup
3	8 May 2008	Darida, Minsk, Belarus	Belarus		6–1	UEFA Euro 2009 qualification
4	28 September 2008	Ďolíček, Prague, Czech Republic	Czech Republic		5–1	UEFA Euro 2009 qualification
5	6 September 2009	Ratina Stadion, Tampere, Finland	Netherlands		2–1	2009 UEFA Championship
6	24 March 2010	Larnaca, Cyprus	South Africa		1–0	2010 Cyprus Cup
7	17 May 2011	Kassam Stadium, Oxford, England	Sweden		2–0	Friendly
8	1 July 2011	Glücksgas Stadium, Dresden, Germany	New Zealand		2–1	2011 FIFA World Cup
9	9 July 2011	BayArena, Leverkusen, Germany	France		1–1	2011 FIFA World Cup
10	21 June 2012	Ob Jezeru, Velenje, Slovenia	Slovenia		4–0	UEFA Euro 2013 qualification
11	21 June 2012	Ob Jezeru, Velenje, Slovenia	Slovenia		4–0	UEFA Euro 2013 qualification
12	19 September 2012	Bescot Stadium, Walsall, England	Croatia		3–0	UEFA Euro 2013 qualification
13	20 October 2012	Stade Sébastien Charléty, Paris, France	France		2–2	Friendly
14	5 April 2014	Falmer Stadium, Brighton and Hove, England	Montenegro		9–0	2015 FIFA Women's World Cup qualification
15	21 September 2015	A. Le Coq Arena, Tallinn, Estonia	Estonia		8–0	UEFA Euro 2017 qualification
16	29 November 2015	Ashton Gate, Bristol, England	Bosnia and Herzegovina		1–0	UEFA Euro 2017 qualification
17	8 April 2016	New York Stadium, Rotherham, England	Belgium		1–1	UEFA Euro 2017 qualification
18	7 June 2016	Sports Center of FA of Serbia, Stara Pazova, Serbia	Serbia		7–0	UEFA Euro 2017 qualification
19	15 September 2016	Meadow Lane, Nottingham, England	Estonia		5–0	UEFA Euro 2017 qualification
20	1 March 2018	Mapfre Stadium, Columbus, Ohio, United States	France		4–1	2018 SheBelieves Cup
21	18 June 2018	Sapsan Arena, Moscow, Russia	Russia		3–1	2019 FIFA Women's World Cup qualification
22	18 June 2018	Sapsan Arena, Moscow, Russia	Russia		3–1	2019 FIFA Women's World Cup qualification
23	31 August 2018	Rodney Parade, Newport, Wales	Wales		3–0	2019 FIFA Women's World Cup qualification
24	25 May 2019	Bescot Stadium, Walsall, England	Denmark		2–0	Friendly
25	27 June 2019	Stade Océane, Le Havre, France	Norway		3–0	2019 FIFA World Cup
26	30 November 2021	Keepmoat Stadium, Doncaster, England	Latvia		20–0	2023 FIFA Women's World Cup qualification
27	30 June 2022	Letzigrund Stadium, Zürich, Switzerland	Switzerland		4–0	Euro 2022 Warm-up match
Goals for Great Britain
1	28 July 2012	Millennium Stadium, Cardiff	Cameroon		3–0	2012 Olympic Games

== Honours ==
Everton

- FA Women's Cup: 2009–10
- FA Women's Premier League Cup: 2007–08

Manchester City

- FA WSL: 2016
- FA Women's Cup: 2016–17, 2018–19, 2019–20
- FA WSL Cup: 2014, 2016, 2018–19

England

- FIFA Women's World Cup third place: 2015
- UEFA Women's Championship: 2022; runner-up: 2009
- Cyprus Cup: 2009, 2013, 2015
- Arnold Clark Cup: 2022

Individual

- Freedom of the City of London (announced 1 August 2022)
- Freedom of the City of Sunderland (8 March 2023)
- English Football Hall of Fame: 2023
- PFA Merit Award: 2023
- Women's Super League Hall of Fame: 2023

== See also ==
- List of women's footballers with 100 or more caps
- List of England women's international footballers
- List of players who have appeared in multiple FIFA Women's World Cups
- List of people from Sunderland
