= Tipton Town Ladies F.C. =

Tipton Town Women FC.
- Full name: Tipton Town Women Football Club
- Founded: 2007
- Ground: Brades Lodge; Lower City Road, Tividale
- Capacity: 1,000
- Chairman: Ian Wheale
- Manager: Kyle Morrison
- League: Birmingham County Women's League
- 2006–07: Birmingham County Women's League, 4th
Home colours	Away colours

Tipton Town Women Football Club are an English amateur women's football club based in Tipton, West Midlands. They play women's association football in the Birmingham County Women's League. The club's colours have traditionally been black and white with a light blue away strip in keeping with the men's team. They reached FA Charter Standard Award status in 2008 and have maintained it ever since and are a member of the National Deaf Children's Society, welcoming deaf players of all ages.

== History ==
The club was founded in the 2007 close season, initially as Netherton Colts. The existing manager resigned from the club, leaving its members no choice but to go it alone. After a lonely period, Angela Boden from Tipton Town men's football club stepped in and offered support and a club to affiliate to. As she runs the girls team, she was quite keen for an adult squad for them to progress to. Faye Harrison, who previously played for Wolves Women, stepped in as manager and Susan Albrighton as secretary, with no experience of running a football club, soon got to grips with it all and managed to get the team through its first season.

The first season was very successful for the ladies, finishing third overall and being piped to promotion by the very last game of the season. The second season was the best by far, finishing in second place in the league and again missing out on first place by the last game and by one goal. They also took part in the first ever Lucozade Sport Performance League, where 80 amateur teams were pitted against each other in a virtual league. Tipton finished 7th out of the 80 teams, but were awarded the Club of the Year Award and treated to a trip to Manchester United's Stadium, Old Trafford. There they were presented with their award and striker Kiren Rana also collected her Golden Boot Trophy after fending off all of the other goal scorers in the league.

After four seasons, manager Faye Harrison stepped away from the club, leaving Susan Albrighton to take the reins. She then promoted former player Kim Meaden to Assistant Manager in 2012 and helped the club regain its status in the community. It was during this season that the ladies merged with the Tipton Town teams and changed sponsors.

== Ground ==
In the early 1970s, Tipton Town Men's Football Club, in conjunction with other local clubs including Tipton Harriers Athletics Club, opened the Tipton Sports Academy, a 19-acre (77,000 m^{2}) multi-purpose sports complex constructed out of former waste and spoilage land. It is now home to several teams, including Tipton Town L.F.C. and West Bromwich Albion L.F.C. Due to the increase in costs, the ladies relocated to a local school to play their home games for season 2012–13.

=== Shirt sponsors and manufacturers ===
Season	Kit manufacturer	Shirt sponsor
2007–08	Sportsbox	Concord Market
2008–09	Sportsbox	Concord Market
2009–10	Sportsbox	Concord Market
2010–11	Sportsbox	Concord Market
2011–12	Sportsbox	No Sponsor
2012–13	Adidas	Tipton & Coseley, Gospel Oak and Linden Homes

|2023–14 |Adidas |Tipton Building Society |}

|2024–14 |Adidas |WAC Manufacturing |}

== Current squad ==
The team

Note: Flags indicate national team as defined under FIFA eligibility rules; some limited exceptions apply. Players may hold more than one non-FIFA nationality.

No.	Pos.	Nation	Player
1	GK	ENG	Gemma Kehoe
2	MF	ENG	Susan Albrighton
3	DF	ENG	Emma Evers
4	DF	ENG	Aleesa Patel
5	DF	ENG	Claire Bolton
6	MF	ENG	Claire Dangerfield
7	MF	ENG	Jade Guppy
8	MF	ENG	Lyndsay Guy
9	MF	ENG	Debbie Sutton
10	MF	ENG	Victoria Cook

No.	Pos.	Nation	Player
11	MF	ENG	Lorraine Hughes
12	MF	ENG	Rhiann Dilmore
13	MF	ENG	Isabella Di Vincenzo
14	MF	ENG	Victoria Valance
15	DF	ENG	Amy Holland
17	FW	ENG	Shelley Gudgeon
18	MF	ENG	Katy Clifford-Sheldon
19	DF	ENG	Amy Lee
20	MF	ENG	Kim Meaden
21	MF	ENG	Gabriella Zentilin
22	MF	ENG	Jessica Everhurst

== Club honours ==
- Birmingham County Women's Division Two Third Place – 2007–08
- Birmingham FA Contribution To Football Award Susan Albrighton 2007–08
- Birmingham County Women's Division One Runners Up – 2008-09
- Lucozade Sport Performance League Club of the Year – 2008-09
- Lucozade Sport Performance League Golden Boot Winner Kiren Rana – 2008-09
- Brasillia Tournament Winners – 2009
- Black Country Futsal League Runners Up – 2008-09
- Birmingham County Women's Division Two Third Place – 2007–08
- Birmingham FA Charter Standard Coach of the Year Faye Harrison 2008-09
- Regional FA Charter Standard Coach of the Year Faye Harrison 2008-09
