= 2010 FA Women's Cup final =

English football cup final

2010 FA Women's Cup Final
- The match programme cover
- Event: 2009–10 FA Women's Cup
Arsenal	Everton
2	3
- after extra time
- Date: 3 May 2010
- Venue: City Ground, Nottingham
- Player of the Match: Natasha Dowie (Everton)
- Referee: Hong Eun-Ah (South Korea)
- Attendance: 17,505

The 2010 FA Women's Cup Final was the 40th final of the FA Women's Cup, England's primary cup competition for women's football teams. It was the 17th final to be held under the direct control of the Football Association (FA). The match was contested by Arsenal and Everton at the City Ground on 3 May 2010. Arsenal entered their fifth consecutive final having won the last four. Already the most successful team in the competition's history with 10 wins from 10 finals, Arsenal sought an 11th victory overall. Everton had one previous final appearance, losing 1–0 to Charlton Athletic in 2005. An earlier incarnation of the club, known as Leasowe Pacific, had lost the 1988 final and won in 1989.

Everton won the match 3–2 after extra time, with two goals from Natasha Dowie either side of an own goal from Arsenal's Faye White. Arsenal had twice equalised; through a Kim Little penalty and a goal from Julie Fleeting.

The match attracted a crowd of 17,505 and was broadcast live on Sky Sports and BBC Radio 5 Live Sports Extra. Arsenal lost their first ever FA Women's Cup final and Everton became the first non–London club to win the trophy since Doncaster Belles 16 years earlier.

== Route to the final ==
=== Arsenal ===
Arsenal needed extra time to eliminate their fourth round opponents Sunderland, whom they had defeated in the previous year's final. Katie Chapman had given Arsenal the lead in the weather-delayed home fixture, only for Ciara Grant to score an own goal in the final minute. Kim Little scored a hat-trick in extra time to secure Arsenal's passage.

In the fifth round Arsenal welcomed Leeds, their vanquished final opponents from 2006 and 2008, to Meadow Park. When Leeds' Ellen White equalised Jen Beattie's opening goal, Jayne Ludlow and Rachel Yankey then gave Arsenal a 3–1 lead. England winger Jessica Clarke scored a late goal for Leeds, but Arsenal held on to reach the quarter finals. A week later the quarter final saw a visit from another Yorkshire outfit, Doncaster Rovers Belles. Arsenal beat their old rivals 5–0 with a goal from Yankey and Kim Little's second hat-trick of the competition. Doncaster's Rachel Williams' own goal completed the scoring.

The semi final versus Chelsea was contested on neutral ground at Staines Town FC. Inspired by the return to form of Julie Fleeting, who had given birth the previous July, Arsenal swept to a 4–0 win. Goals from Little, Faye White and Ludlow added to Fleeting's opener to clinch Arsenal's place in the final.

=== Everton ===
Everton began their campaign with a home fixture against FA Women's Premier League Southern Division club Queens Park Rangers. Jill Scott, Rachel Unitt, Michelle Hinnigan and Fara Williams all scored to put Everton four goals ahead, before Cherrelle Albert reduced the arrears. Gwennan Harries scored two late goals, either side of Beth Curtis' goal for QPR, to make the final score 6–2.

The fifth round saw more Southern Division opposition travel to Everton's Rossett Park home, in the shape of Portsmouth. The south coast team were dismissed even more emphatically than QPR had been, with Toni Duggan scoring a hat-trick in a 7–0 win. Scott, Natasha Dowie, Williams and Jody Handley also scored for Everton.

In the quarter final Everton met top-flight opponents for the first time as Blackburn Rovers were the visitors. Duggan equalised Danielle Sheen's ninth-minute goal for Blackburn, then Michelle Evans scored the winner early in the second half.

Haig Avenue in Southport hosted Everton's semi final against Barnet. Another Southern Division team, who had contested the 1997 final as Wembley Ladies, Barnet proved worthy opponents and almost took the lead in the first half. But two minutes into the second period, Dowie capitalised on a defensive error to put Everton ahead. Williams' overhead kick in the 86th minute then sealed Everton's place in the final.

Arsenal		Round	Everton	
Sunderland (PLN); H 4–1 (aet)	Chapman, Little (3)	Round 4	Queens Park Rangers (PLS); H 6–2	Scott, Unitt, Hinnigan, Williams, Harries (2)
Leeds Carnegie (PLN); H 3–2	Beattie, Ludlow, Yankey	Round 5	Portsmouth (PLS); H 7–0	Duggan (3), Scott, Dowie, Williams, Handley
Doncaster Rovers Belles (PLN); H 5–0	Yankey, Little (3), Williams (o.g.)	Round 6	Blackburn Rovers (PLN); H 2–1	Duggan, Evans
Chelsea (PLN); Wheatsheaf Park, Staines; 4–0	Fleeting, Little, White, Ludlow	Semi-Final	Barnet (PLS); Haig Avenue, Southport; 2–0	Dowie, Williams

- (PLN) = FA Women's Premier League National Division team
- (PLS) = FA Women's Premier League Southern Division team

== Background ==
Since their first final win over Doncaster Belles in 1993, Arsenal had reached nine more, winning all of them. Liverpool Ladies were beaten 3–2 in 1995, then Croydon by the same score in 1998. In 1999 Southampton Saints lost 2–0 to Arsenal. 2001 saw full-time professional Fulham defeated 1–0. In 2004 and 2007 Charlton Athletic lost 3–0 and 4–1, respectively, while Leeds United were thrashed 5–0 in 2006 then 4–1 in 2008. The 2009 final saw Arsenal beat Sunderland 2–1 to win the Cup for a record 10th time.

Everton's manager Mo Marley had been part of the Leasowe Pacific team which lifted the Cup for the only time in 1989. They defeated Friends of Fulham, for whom Hope Powell scored twice, 3–2 at Old Trafford. This avenged their 3–1 defeat to Doncaster Belles in the previous year's final. Playing as Everton, the club reached the final again in 2005, but were beaten 1–0 by Charlton Athletic.

Everton had emerged as the main challengers to Arsenal's dominance of women's football in England, since Charlton Athletic had their funding withdrawn in 2007. Everton's 1–0 win in the 2008 Premier League Cup final was Arsenal's first domestic defeat for a period spanning two years and 58 matches. During this time Arsenal had won an unprecedented quadruple, including the 2007 UEFA Women's Cup. When Everton held Arsenal to a 0–0 draw in April 2008, it was the first league points Arsenal had dropped for 17 months. In the 2008–09 FA Women's Premier League season, Arsenal won the title from Everton on goal difference after beating them 1–0 on the final day.

The rivalry continued into the 2009–10 campaign and became increasingly fractious. When Everton beat Arsenal 2–1 in extra time at the Premier League Cup semi final, Arsenal's goalkeeper Emma Byrne was sent off for punching Everton striker Natasha Dowie. During Arsenal's 1–0 league win at Everton in April, Jayne Ludlow was red carded for an "aggressive outburst" at Fara Williams. This meant that club captain Ludlow was suspended for the final.

"We sometimes haven't delivered on the big occasion, but we can beat anybody on our day. We've done that against Arsenal in the past - and we can do it again."

— Mo Marley, Everton manager

Before the match Arsenal were motivated by a desire to prove they were still England's top club, despite several leading players departing for the Women's Professional Soccer league in the United States. Since taking over as manager from Tony Gervaise in February, Laura Harvey had presided over a 100% record which she was keen to extend at Everton's expense.

Everton wanted to atone for their failure in the 2005 final. According to manager Mo Marley they had performed to 10% of their capabilities in that match. Fara Williams considered that Everton were unfortunate to lose the recent league match with Arsenal and would take heart from that performance. Williams and her team mates also wished to "bounce back" from their shock Premier League Cup final defeat to Leeds.

Veteran full-back Becky Easton had played in Cup final defeats with Everton in 2005, Liverpool in 1995 and 1996, as well as captaining Doncaster Belles in their 2002 defeat to Fulham. She had been with Liverpool's forerunners Knowsley United, but was cup-tied for their appearance in the 1994 final. Easton said: "I've been trying for years and years and haven't been able to do it [win the Cup] before. It would obviously be great for the club, because we haven’t won it as 'Everton', but on a personal note it would just be absolutely fantastic." Rachel Brown had played for Liverpool as a 15-year-old schoolgirl in the 1996 final, but was injured in 2005 and had not played in the final again since. She told the Liverpool Echo: "I wouldn't say I'm in the twilight of my career but it's been a long time since 1996, so I'm very determined to put things right."

== Match ==
=== Team news ===
The team managers Marley and Harvey, colleagues in coaching the England women's Under–19 team, named identical 4–2–1–3 formations.

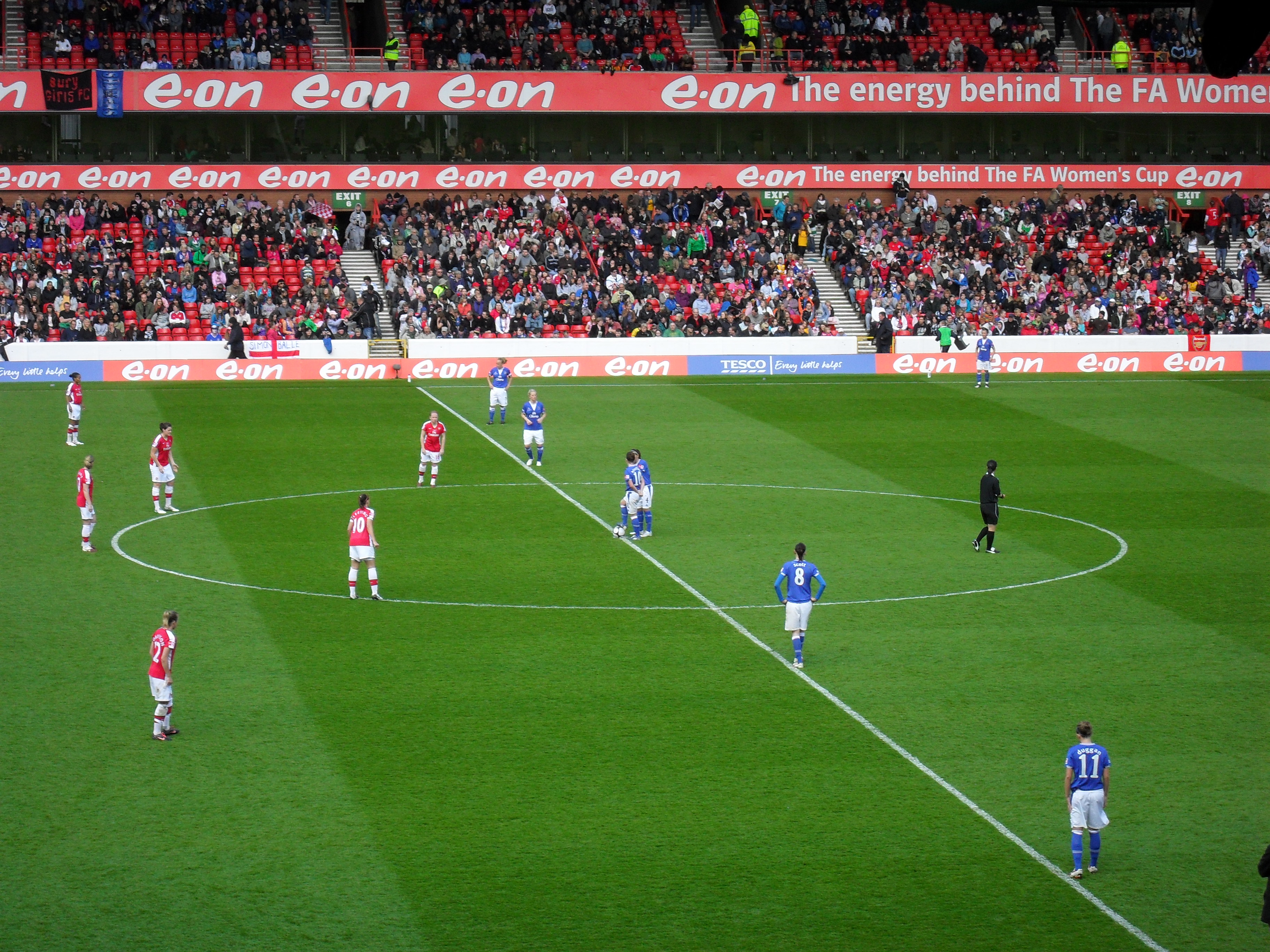
Both teams named attacking lineups

Despite questionable fitness Julie Fleeting led Arsenal's attack, supported by Kim Little and flanked by wingers Rachel Yankey and Gemma Davison. It was Fleeting's fifth FA Women's Cup final after appearances in 2004, 2006, 2007 and 2008 but after enduring a difficult pregnancy, a hernia had left her unable to train properly or play for 90 minutes. With Jayne Ludlow suspended and Katie Chapman having signed for Chicago Red Stars, Arsenal's midfield comprised Ciara Grant—latterly a centre back—and utility player Jen Beattie. Regular goalkeeper Emma Byrne played behind central defensive pair Faye White and Gilly Flaherty, with Niamh Fahey and Corinne Yorston in the full-back positions.

Everton named a back five of experienced England international players: goalkeeper Rachel Brown, Rachel Unitt, Emily Westwood, Lindsay Johnson and Becky Easton. Fara Williams and Jill Scott played in the centre, with captain Jody Handley on the right and 18-year-old Toni Duggan on the left. Michelle Hinnigan started behind centre forward Natasha Dowie, niece of Iain. In 2007 Dowie had rejected a transfer to Arsenal in favour of Everton, stating her desire to "knock Arsenal off their pedestal in women's football."

=== Summary ===
The match began in heavy rain, causing difficulty to both sets of players. After 16 minutes, Fara Williams' firmly struck shot was palmed away by Byrne, but Jody Handley collected the ball on the right-wing and passed inside to Natasha Dowie who scored from close range after Faye White blocked her first attempt.

Two minutes before half time Arsenal equalised when Gemma Davison outpaced Rachel Unitt down Arsenal's right flank. Unitt's sliding tackle tripped Davison, conceding a penalty kick and earning a yellow card from referee Hong. Kim Little sidefooted her 42nd goal of the season from the penalty spot, low to the goalkeeper's left.

In first half stoppage time Arsenal fell behind again when Faye White, under pressure from Jill Scott, used her head to divert Toni Duggan's high left-wing cross past Emma Byrne and into her own goal. Nine minutes into the second half Julie Fleeting found space in the penalty area and in the act of falling over, looped Rachel Yankey's low cut back over Everton goalkeeper Brown to make the score 2–2.

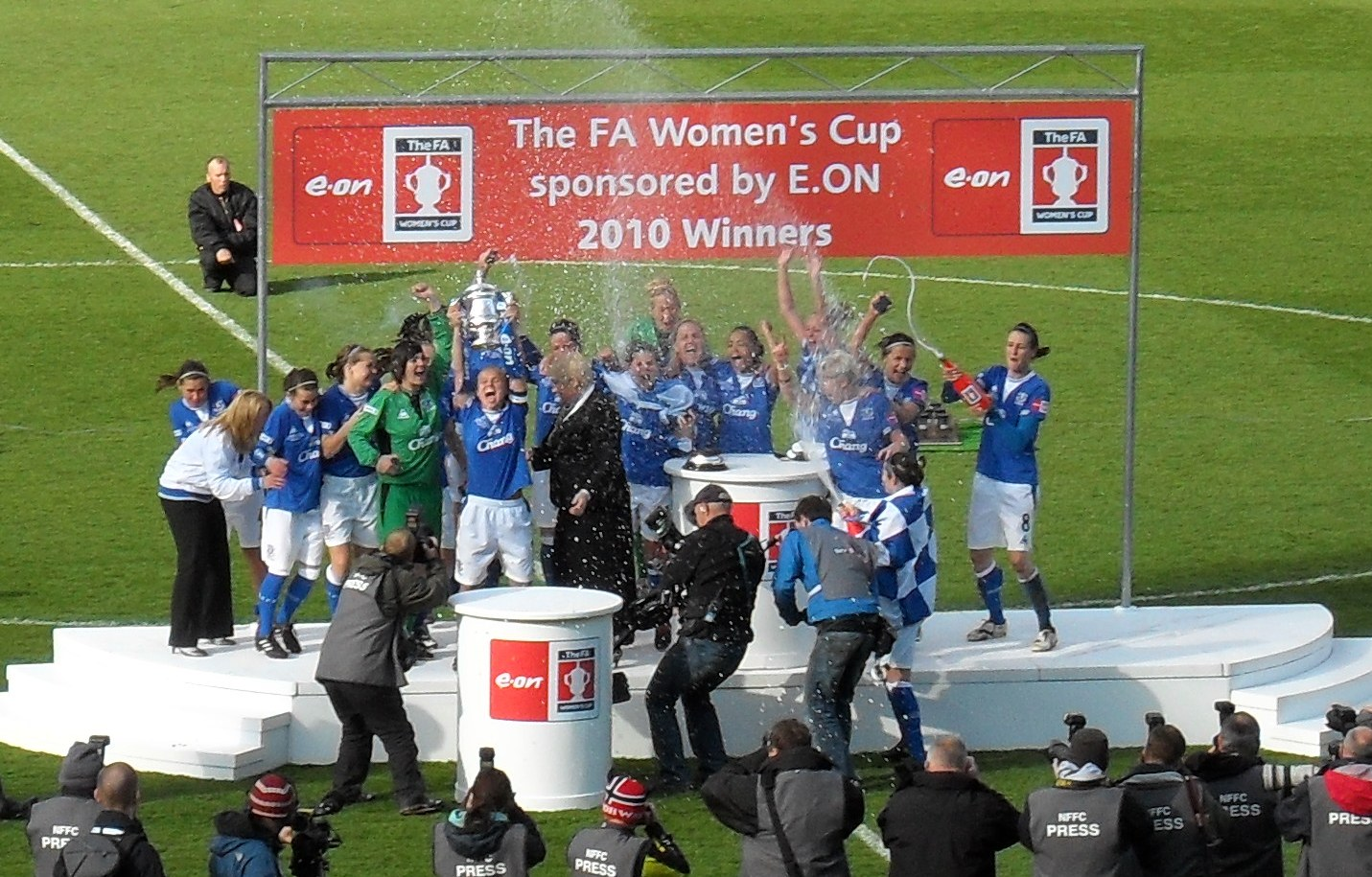
Everton Ladies celebrate

Fleeting was withdrawn after 70 minutes, for 16-year-old schoolgirl Danielle Carter. Everton manager Marley had already replaced cautioned left-back Unitt with Fern Whelan on 63 minutes.

The match finished level and with both teams tiring, extra time contained less incident. Two minutes prior to the end of extra time, Everton substitute Brooke Chaplen passed the ball through the Arsenal defence to Natasha Dowie who broke into the right hand side of the penalty area. After beating the onrushing goalkeeper Emma Byrne in a race to the ball, Dowie knocked the ball into the net from an acute angle for her 28th goal of the season. Elated, Dowie ran into the crowd and hugged a random little boy: "I don't even know if he was a supporter," she later told reporters.

=== Details ===
3 May 2010
15:00 BST

Arsenal	2–3 (a.e.t.)	Everton
Little 43' (pen.); Fleeting 54'	Report	Dowie 16', 119'; White 45+2' (o.g.)

City Ground, Nottingham
Attendance: 17,505
Referee: Hong Eun-Ah (South Korea)

Arsenal	Everton

GK	1	(Republic of Ireland) Emma Byrne
DF	2	(England) Corinne Yorston
DF	6	(England) Faye White (c)
DF	5	(England) Gilly Flaherty
DF	19	(Republic of Ireland) Niamh Fahey
MF	7	(Republic of Ireland) Ciara Grant	(yellow card) 113'
MF	14	(Scotland) Jen Beattie
MF	16	(Scotland) Kim Little
FW	11	(England) Rachel Yankey
FW	10	(Scotland) Julie Fleeting		(substituted off) 70'
FW	12	(England) Gemma Davison
Substitutes:
DF	3	(Republic of Ireland) Yvonne Tracy
GK	13	(Jamaica) Becky Spencer
FW	20	(Wales) Helen Lander
FW	25	(England) Lauren Bruton
FW	28	(England) Danielle Carter		(substituted on) 70'
Manager:
(England) Laura Harvey

GK	1	(England) Rachel Brown
DF	2	(England) Becky Easton
DF	5	(England) Emily Westwood	(yellow card) 39'
DF	6	(England) Lindsay Johnson	(yellow card) 87'
DF	3	(England) Rachel Unitt	(yellow card) 42'	(substituted off) 63'
MF	8	(England) Jill Scott
MF	4	(England) Fara Williams	(yellow card) 73'
MF	10	(England) Michelle Hinnigan		(substituted off) 77'
FW	7	(England) Jody Handley (c)
FW	9	(England) Natasha Dowie
FW	11	(England) Toni Duggan		(substituted off) 111'
Substitutes:
DF	12	(England) Alex Culvin
GK	13	(England) Nicola Hobbs
DF	14	(England) Brooke Chaplen		(substituted on) 77'
DF	15	(England) Fern Whelan		(substituted on) 63'
MF	16	(England) Michelle Evans		(substituted on) 111'
Manager:
(England) Mo Marley

Player of the match
Natasha Dowie (Everton)

Assistant referees:
Jane Simms (West Riding)
Lisa Rashid (Birmingham)
Fourth official:
Helen Fulcher (Lincolnshire)

Match rules

- 90 minutes.
- 30 minutes of extra-time if necessary.
- Penalty shoot-out if scores still level.
- Five named substitutes.
- Maximum of three substitutions.

==== Records ====
- Arsenal Ladies lost an FA Women's Cup final for the first time.
- Everton's victory was the first for a club from outside London since Doncaster Belles in 1994.

== Post match ==
The match had been played at Nottingham's City Ground for the third time in four seasons, where organisers had hoped to break the final attendance record of 24,582 set in 2008 at the same venue. The game was shown live on Sky Sports 2, attracting viewing figures of 139,000. Full match commentary was broadcast on BBC Radio 5 Live Sports Extra and BBC Radio Merseyside.
