= Rachel Unitt =

English footballer (born 1982)

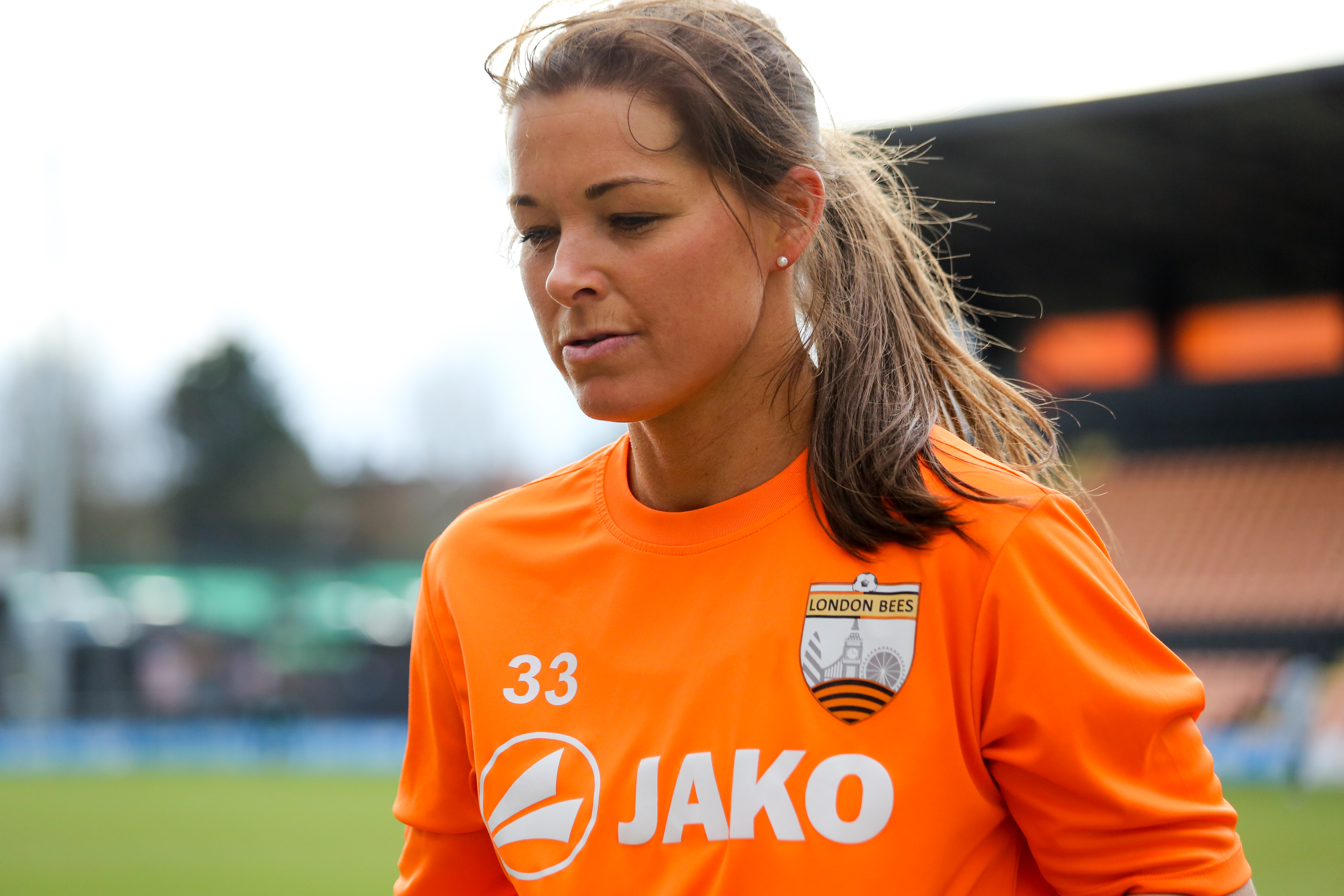
- Unitt in 2019

Personal information
- Full name: Rachel Elizabeth Unitt
- Date of birth: 5 June 1982 (age 44)
- Place of birth: Walsall, England
- Height: 5 ft 6 in (1.68 m)
- Position: Left-back

Senior career*
Years	Team	Apps	(Gls)
1998–2000	Wolverhampton Wanderers		
2000–2001	Everton		
2001–2004	Fulham		
2004–2011	Everton		
2005	New Jersey Wildcats	3	(2)
2010	Leeds City Vixens		
2012–2013	Birmingham City	11	(1)
2014–2016	Notts County	5	(0)
2016–2017	Solihull Moors		
2018–2020	London Bees	5	(1)

International career^{‡}
1998–2001	England U-19	7	(2)
2000–2013	England	102	(8)
- * Club domestic league appearances and goals as of 09:08, 19 December 2018 (UTC) ‡ National team caps and goals as of 12:54, 30 January 2014 (UTC)

Rachel Elizabeth Unitt (born 5 June 1982) is an English former footballer who played as a left-back.

After beginning her club career with Wolverhampton Wanderers, Unitt began a long association with Everton in 2000. This was intersected by a three-year spell at Fulham between 2001 and 2004 and a summer on loan to New Jersey Wildcats in 2005. She left Everton in 2012 for a two-year stint at Birmingham City and later played for Notts County in 2014. She finished out her career with Solihull Moors and London Bees.

A sturdy left-back, Unitt has won over 100 caps for the England women's national football team since her debut in August 2000. She represented England at the 2001, 2005 and 2009 editions of the UEFA Women's Championship as well as at the FIFA Women's World Cup in 2007 and 2011. She was ruled out of both the 2013 UEFA Women's Championship and the Great Britain squad for the 2012 Summer Olympics due to injury. In 2004 and 2006, Unitt was named The Football Association's (FA) International Player of the Year. In 2016, she was inducted into the English Football Hall of Fame at the National Football Museum.

== Club career ==
Unitt started her footballing career with Wolverhampton Wanderers as a 14-year-old. She joined Everton for the 2000–01 season, before signing a professional contract with Fulham the following season. After a successful spell at Fulham, she returned to Everton in 2004. Her achievements to date include winning the domestic treble with Fulham in the 2002–03 season and the 2010 FA Women's Cup with Everton.

In July 2005, Unitt moved to the United States to join W-League side New Jersey Wildcats for the last seven games of their season, teaming up with England and former Fulham teammate Rachel Yankey. The Wildcats eventually won the W-League championship, beating the Ottawa Fury by 3–0 in the championship match with Unitt scoring the first goal. Unitt also trained with Malmö FF in December 2005, but, fearing burn-out, rejected a contract offer from the Swedish club.

With Everton dormant ahead of the 2011 FA WSL season, Unitt played for Leeds City Vixens in the FA Women's Premier League Cup. At the end of the season, Unitt put in a transfer request after eight years at Everton. Following negotiations, a move to Birmingham City was announced in February 2012. After her time at the club was disrupted by injury, Unitt rejected Birmingham's offer of a contract extension in January 2014 and left the club as a free agent. She signed for Notts County on 30 January 2014, only to suffer an injury to the cruciate ligament in her other knee during the 2014 FA WSL season. In December 2014, she agreed to stay with Notts County, combining her rehabilitation with a place on the club's coaching staff.

In 2016, Unitt played for Solihull Moors, a women's football club in the West Midlands, which at the time was in the FA Women's Premier League.

== International career ==
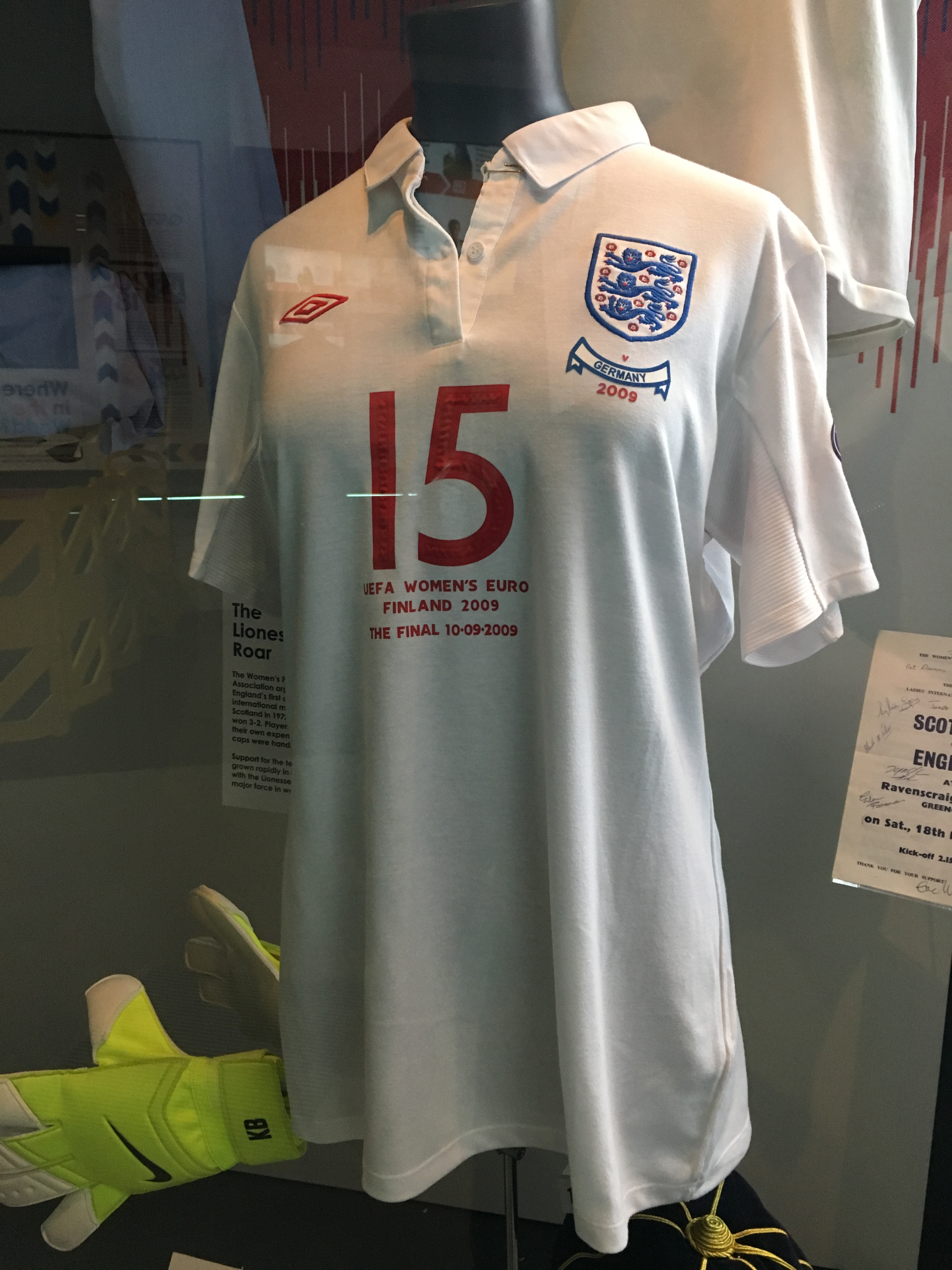
Unitt's shirt from the UEFA Women's Euro 2009 final

Unitt first played for England in 2000, after 16 appearances for the U18s. Her senior debut came in August 2000, in a 1–0 friendly defeat to France, before 50,000 spectators at Stade Vélodrome. She scored her first international goal in England's victory over the Netherlands in September 2004, and scored twice more in her hometown of Walsall during England's 4–1 friendly win over the Czech Republic in May 2005.

Unitt was named the International Player of the Year at the 2004 The FA Women's Football Awards. She won the same award in 2006, voted for by the fans on the FA website.

In May 2009, Unitt was one of the first 17 female players to be given central contracts by The Football Association.

At the 2007 FIFA Women's World Cup in China, Unitt was the only outfield member of the England squad who remained unused. On the occasion of her 90th cap, she eventually made a World Cup debut in June 2011, starting England's 1–1 draw with Mexico in Wolfsburg. In March 2012, a Euro 2013 qualifier in Croatia saw Unitt win her 100th international cap. Captain for the day, Unitt scored England's third goal in a 6–0 victory, with a diving header.

A foot injury kept Unitt out of contention for a place in the Great Britain squad for the 2012 Summer Olympics. During her absence, Steph Houghton became the first choice left–back for the national team. In May 2013, Unitt suffered an anterior cruciate ligament injury in Birmingham City's 1–1 FA WSL Cup draw with Lincoln, which ruled her out of UEFA Women's Euro 2013.

She was allotted 135 when the FA announced their legacy numbers scheme to honour the 50th anniversary of England's inaugural international.

=== International goals ===
Scores and results list England's goal tally first.

#	Date	Venue	Opponent	Result	Competition	Scored
1	22 September 2004	Sportcomplex Hollandia, Tuitjenhorn	Netherlands	1–0	Friendly	1
3	26 May 2005	Bescot Stadium, Walsall	Czech Republic	4–1	Friendly	2
4	9 February 2006	Dasaki Stadium, Achna	Sweden	1–1	Friendly	1
5	25 October 2009	Bloomfield Road, Blackpool	Malta	8–0	2011 FIFA World Cup qual.	1
6	26 November 2009	Buca Arena, İzmir	Turkey	3–0	2011 FIFA World Cup qual.	1
7	19 June 2010	Aranda de Duero	Spain	2–2	2011 FIFA World Cup qual.	1
8	31 March 2012	Sajmište, Vrbovec	Croatia	6–0	2013 UEFA Championship qual.	1

== Personal life ==
After retiring as a player, Unitt became a firefighter in Stoke-on-Trent. Her younger sister Shelly is engaged to former footballer Jill Scott.

== Honours ==
Fulham

- FA Women's Premier League National Division: 2002–03
- FA Women's Premier League Southern Division: 2001–02
- FA Women's Cup: 2001–02, 2002–03
- FA Women's Premier League Cup: 2001–02, 2002–03
- FA Women's Community Shield: 2003, 2004

Everton

- FA Women's Cup: 2009–10
- FA Women's Premier League Cup: 2007–08

Birmingham City

- FA Women's Cup: 2011–12

Individual

- FA International Player of the Year Award: 2003–04, 2005–06
