= Cullompton Rangers L.F.C. =

English women's football club

Cullompton Rangers Ladies FC
- Full name: Cullompton Rangers Ladies FC
- Nickname(s): Cully
- Founded: Formerly Exeter City LFC (granted name change in 2006)
- Ground: Speeds Meadow, Cullompton, Devon
- Capacity: n/a
- Chairman: Bill Newcombe
- Manager: Phil Tuckett
- League: South West Combination
Home colours	Away colours

Cullompton Rangers LFC were an English women's football club. Formerly known as Exeter City L.F.C. the club amalgamated with Cullompton Rangers AFC and were formally granted a name change by Devon FA in 2006. They played their home matches at Speeds Meadow, Cullompton, Devon. In 2011 the club folded when the manager was forced to leave and a replacement could not be found.

== Honours ==
As Cullompton Rangers L.F.C.:

- South West Women's Football League – Premier Division Champions: 1
  - 2008–09
- Devon County Cup Winners: 1
  - 2007

As Exeter City L.F.C.:

- Pat Sowden Cup Winners: 1
  - 2002
- South West Women's Football League – Premier Division Champions: 1
  - 2001–02

As Elmore Eagles L.F.C.:

- South West Women's Football League – Premier Division Runners Up: 1
  - 1999–00
- Devon Cup Winners: 2
  - 1998, 1999
- Pat Sowden Cup Winners: 1
  - 1998
- South West Women's Football League – Third Division Champions: 1
  - 1997–98

== Seasonal records ==
Season	Division	Position	Cups	Top Scorer	Goals
2004–05	South West Women's Combination League	5th		Jo Goldsworthy	24
2005–06	South West Women's Football League Premier Division	6th			
2006–07	South West Women's Football League Premier Division	2nd	Devon Cup Winners	Laura Gough	13
2007–08	South West Women's Football League Premier Division	4th		Emma Redwood	18
2008–09	South West Women's Football League Premier Division	1st (Promoted)		Lola Sanchez	40

== Squad ==
=== Staff ===
- Manager: Phill Tuckett
- Coach: Maxine Coupe
- Chairman: Bill Newcombe
- Secretary c/o: Emma Redwood

== See also ==
- Cullompton Rangers A.F.C.
