= 2019–20 Everton F.C. (women) season =

Everton
2019–20 season
- Head Coach: Willie Kirk
- Stadium: Walton Hall Park, Liverpool (Haig Avenue, Southport until 23 February)
- FA WSL: 6th
- FA Cup: Runners-up
- League Cup: Group stage
- Top goalscorer: League: Chloe Kelly (9); All: Chloe Kelly (9)
- Highest home attendance: 893 (vs. Manchester United, 23 February)
- Lowest home attendance: 150 (vs. Tottenham Hotspur, 24 November)
- Average home league attendance: 402 as of 23 February 2020
| Home colours | Away colours | Third colours |

The 2019–20 Everton F.C. season was the club's third consecutive campaign in the FA Women's Super League, the highest level of the football pyramid, having been promoted at the end of the 2017 Spring Series. Along with competing in the WSL, the club also contested two domestic cup competitions: the FA Cup and the League Cup.

Ahead of the 2019–20 season, the team dropped Ladies from their name. Although now simply called Everton whenever possible, the club uses Everton Women in a formal capacity when necessary to avoid confusion with the men's team.

On 13 March 2020, in line with the FA's response to the coronavirus pandemic, it was announced the season was temporarily suspended until at least 3 April 2020. After further postponements, the season was ultimately ended prematurely on 25 May 2020 with immediate effect. Everton sat in 7th at the time but moved ahead of Tottenham Hotspur into 6th on sporting merit after The FA Board's decision to award places on a points-per-game basis.

== Squad ==
As of 30 January 2020.

Note: Flags indicate national team as defined under FIFA eligibility rules; some limited exceptions apply. Players may hold more than one non-FIFA nationality.

| No. | Pos. | Nation | Player |
|---|---|---|---|
| 1 | GK | ENG | Kirstie Levell |
| 2 | DF | ENG | Taylor Hinds |
| 3 | DF | ENG | Danielle Turner |
| 5 | DF | NED | Kika van Es |
| 6 | DF | ENG | Gabrielle George |
| 7 | FW | ENG | Chantelle Boye-Hlorkah |
| 8 | MF | NED | Inessa Kaagman |
| 9 | FW | WAL | Elise Hughes |
| 10 | FW | NIR | Simone Magill |
| 11 | FW | ENG | Chloe Kelly |
| 12 | FW | AUS | Hayley Raso |

| No. | Pos. | Nation | Player |
|---|---|---|---|
| 13 | MF | ENG | Abbey-Leigh Stringer |
| 14 | DF | ENG | Esme Morgan (on loan from Manchester City) |
| 15 | MF | ENG | Molly Pike |
| 16 | FW | ENG | Hannah Cain |
| 17 | MF | SCO | Lucy Graham (captain) |
| 18 | GK | ENG | Sandy MacIver |
| 20 | MF | ENG | Megan Finnigan |
| 21 | MF | FRA | Maéva Clémaron |
| 23 | GK | FIN | Tinja-Riikka Korpela |
| 25 | DF | ENG | Hannah Coan |
| 27 | MF | ENG | Izzy Christiansen |

== Pre-season ==
| 26 July 2019 Friendly | Aston Villa | 2–1 | Everton | Boldmere |
| 19:30 | Johnson; Ale | | Boye-Hlorkah | Stadium: Boldmere St Michael's |

| 4 August 2019 Friendly | Sheffield United | – | Everton | Sheffield |
| 14:00 | | | | Stadium: Sheffield United Academy |
Note: No official scoreline released

| 11 August 2019 Friendly | Durham | 0–2 | Everton | Durham |
| 14:00 | | Report | Christon (o.g.); Kaagman | Stadium: New Ferens Park |

| 17 August 2019 Friendly | Ajax (Netherlands) | 1–2 | Everton | Amsterdam, Netherlands |
| 13:00 | van den Bighelaar 14' (pen.) | | Cain 49' (pen.); Finnigan 60' | Stadium: Olympisch Stadion |

== FA Women's Super League ==
Everton planned to only play their opening two home games at Haig Avenue in Southport before moving to their new Walton Hall Park site in time for their third home game, scheduled for 27 October 2019 against Brighton & Hove Albion. However, delays meant the move was postponed until February 2020. The Merseyside derby was also moved to Goodison Park, originally scheduled for 9 February although the game rearranged to March because of Storm Ciara.

=== Results summary ===
| Overall | | | | | | | | Home | | | | | | Away | | | | | |
| Pld | W | D | L | GF | GA | GD | Pts | W | D | L | GF | GA | GD | W | D | L | GF | GA | GD |
|---|---|---|---|---|---|---|---|---|---|---|---|---|---|---|---|---|---|---|---|
| 14 | 6 | 1 | 7 | 21 | 21 | 0 | 19 | 4 | 0 | 3 | 13 | 9 | +4 | 2 | 1 | 4 | 8 | 12 | −4 |

Last updated: 23 February 2020.
Source: FA WSL

=== Results by matchday ===
| Round | 1 | 2 | 3 | 4 | 5 | 6 | 7 | 8 | 9 | 10 | 11 | 12 | 13 | 14 | 15 | 16 | 17 | 18 | 19 | 20 | 21 | 22 |
|---|---|---|---|---|---|---|---|---|---|---|---|---|---|---|---|---|---|---|---|---|---|---|
| Ground | A | H | H | A | H | A | H | A | H | A | H | A | A | H | A | H | H | A | A | H | H | A |
| Result | W | W | L | L | W | W | W | L | L | L | W | L | D | L | C | C | C | C | C | C | C | C |
| Position | 3 | 1 | 4 | 5 | 5 | 4 | 4 | 5 | 5 | 7 | 5 | 5 | 6 | 7 | | | | | | | | |

A = Away; H = Home; W = Win; D = Draw; L = Loss

=== Results ===
| 8 September 2019 1 | Birmingham City | 0–1 | Everton | Solihull |
| 14:00 | Harrop (yellow card) 22'; Grant (yellow card) 83' | Report | Morgan (yellow card) 39'; Harrop 46' (o.g.) | Stadium: Damson Park; Attendance: 873; Referee: Elliott Swallow |

| 15 September 2019 2 | Everton | 2–0 | Bristol City | Southport |
| 12:30 | George (yellow card) 14'; Kelly 44', 45+1'; Clémaron (yellow card) 72' | Report | | Stadium: Haig Avenue; Attendance: 441; Referee: Amy Fearn |

| 29 September 2019 3 | Everton | 0–1 | Manchester City | Southport |
| 12:30 | | Report | Houghton 7'; Wullaert (yellow card) 12'; Mannion (yellow card) 45'; Scott (yellow card) 58'; Beckie (yellow card) 78' | Stadium: Haig Avenue; Attendance: 378; Referee: Lewis Smith |

| 13 October 2019 4 | Reading | 3–2 | Everton | High Wycombe |
| 14:00 | Moore 7', 17'; Farrow (yellow card) 55'; Utland 70' | Report | Kelly 10', (yellow card) 80'; Graham 23' (pen.), (yellow card) 69'; Clémaron (yellow card) 90+3' | Stadium: Adams Park; Attendance: 616; Referee: Alan Dale |

| 27 October 2019 5 | Everton | 2–0 | Brighton & Hove Albion | Southport |
| 12:30 | Clémaron (yellow card) 25'; Kelly 58'; Morgan 68' | Report | Buet (yellow card) 80' | Stadium: Haig Avenue; Attendance: 331; Referee: Jane Simms |

| 17 November 2019 6 | Liverpool | 0–1 | Everton | Liverpool |
| 14:00 | | Report | Graham 45+1', (yellow card) 56' | Stadium: Anfield; Attendance: 23,500; Referee: Amy Fearn |

| 24 November 2019 7 | Everton | 3–1 | Tottenham Hotspur | Southport |
| 12:30 | Pike 7'; Filbey 26' (o.g.); Morgan (yellow card) 35'; George (yellow card) 43'; Graham 56'; Kaagman (yellow card) 90+1' | Report | Quinn 19'; Green (yellow card) 23'; Leon (yellow card) 67' | Stadium: Haig Avenue; Attendance: 150; Referee: Michael Barlow |

| 1 December 2019 | Everton | P–P | Chelsea | Southport |
| 12:30 | | | | Stadium: Haig Avenue |
Note: Postponed due to frozen pitch

| 8 December 2019 8 | Manchester United | 3–1 | Everton | Leigh |
| 12:00 | James 4', 45'; Zelem 11' (pen.); Ladd (yellow card) 33' | Report | Earps 2' (o.g.); Clemaron (yellow card) 68' | Stadium: Leigh Sports Village; Attendance: 1,805; Referee: Joe Hull |

| 15 December 2019 9 | Everton | 1–3 | Arsenal | Southport |
| 12:30 | George (yellow card) 32'; Kelly 78' | Report | Miedema 14', 57'; Little 55' | Stadium: Haig Avenue; Attendance: 451; Referee: Benjamin Speedie |

| 5 January 2020 | West Ham United | P–P | Everton | Romford |
| 15:00 | | | | Stadium: Rush Green Stadium |
Note: Postponed due to flu outbreak

| 11 January 2020 10 | Manchester City | 3–1 | Everton | Manchester |
| 17:30 | Bremer 18', 53'; Hemp (yellow card) 54'; Bonner 64' | Report | Kaagman (yellow card) 38'; Stringer (yellow card) 64'; Stanway 90' (o.g.) | Stadium: Academy Stadium; Attendance: 1,681; Referee: Amy Fearn |

| 19 January 2020 11 | Everton | 3–1 | Reading | Southport |
| 14:00 | Kelly 11', 59', 65'; Stringer (yellow card) 48' | Report | Williams 31' (pen.); Allen (yellow card) 81'; Moore (yellow card) 90+4' | Stadium: Haig Avenue; Attendance: 167; Referee: Peter Shackleton |

| 2 February 2020 12 | Brighton & Hove Albion | 1–0 | Everton | Crawley |
| 14:00 | A. Whelan 39'; Umotong (yellow card) 63'; Barton (yellow card) 75'; Green (yellow card) 82'; Gibbons (yellow card) 87' | Report | Stringer (yellow card) 38'; Cain (yellow card) 90+4' | Stadium: Broadfield Stadium; Attendance: 830; Referee: Abigail Byrne |

| 9 February 2020 | Everton | P–P | Liverpool | Liverpool |
| 14:00 | | | | Stadium: Goodison Park |
Note: All WSL games postponed due to adverse weather conditions

| 12 February 2020 13 | Tottenham Hotspur | 2–2 | Everton | Canons Park |
| 19:30 | Percival (yellow card) 61'; Addison 68'; Ayane (red card) 77'; Mitchell 78' | Report | Kelly (yellow card) 29', (goal) 31'; Kaagman 57'; Cain (yellow card) 86' | Stadium: The Hive Stadium; Attendance: 768; Referee: Ryan Atkin |

| 23 February 2020 14 | Everton | 2–3 | Manchester United | Liverpool |
| 12:30 | D. Turner 68'; Graham 83' | Report | M. Turner (yellow card) 20'; Galton 21', 29'; Ladd (yellow card) 56'; Toone 63'; Smith (yellow card) 90+2' | Stadium: Walton Hall Park; Attendance: 893; Referee: Andrew Sykes |

| 22 March 2020 15 | Chelsea | Cancelled | Everton | Kingston upon Thames |
| 14:00 | | | | Stadium: Kingsmeadow |
Note: Cancelled due to coronavirus pandemic

| 25 March 2020 16 | Everton | Cancelled | Liverpool | Liverpool |
| 19:00 | | | | Stadium: Goodison Park |
Note: Rescheduled from 9 February 2020. Cancelled due to coronavirus pandemic

| 29 March 2020 17 | Everton | Cancelled | Birmingham City | Liverpool |
| 12:30 | | | | Stadium: Walton Hall Park |
Note: Cancelled due to coronavirus pandemic

| 1 April 2020 18 | West Ham United | Cancelled | Everton | Romford |
| 19:30 | | | | Stadium: Rush Green Stadium |
Note: Rescheduled from 5 January 2020. Cancelled due to coronavirus pandemic

| 5 April 2020 19 | Bristol City | Cancelled | Everton | Filton |
| 15:00 | | | | Stadium: Stoke Gifford Stadium |
Note: Cancelled due to coronavirus pandemic

| 26 April 2020 20 | Everton | Cancelled | West Ham United | Liverpool |
| 12:30 | | | | Stadium: Walton Hall Park |
Note: Cancelled due to coronavirus pandemic

| 3 May 2020 21 | Everton | Cancelled | Chelsea | Liverpool |
| 12:30 | | | | Stadium: Walton Hall Park |
Note: Rescheduled from 1 December 2019. Cancelled due to coronavirus pandemic

| 16 May 2020 22 | Arsenal | Cancelled | Everton | Borehamwood |
| 14:00 | | | | Stadium: Meadow Park |
Note: Cancelled due to coronavirus pandemic

=== League table ===
| Pos | Team | Pld | W | D | L | GF | GA | GD | Pts | PPG |
|---|---|---|---|---|---|---|---|---|---|---|
| 4 | Manchester United | 14 | 7 | 2 | 5 | 24 | 12 | +12 | 23 | 1.64 |
| 5 | Reading | 14 | 6 | 3 | 5 | 21 | 24 | −3 | 21 | 1.50 |
| 6 | Everton | 14 | 6 | 1 | 7 | 21 | 21 | 0 | 19 | 1.36 |
| 7 | Tottenham Hotspur | 15 | 6 | 2 | 7 | 15 | 24 | −9 | 20 | 1.33 |
| 8 | West Ham United | 14 | 5 | 1 | 8 | 19 | 34 | −15 | 16 | 1.14 |

Source: FA WSL, BBC
Rules for classification: Initially: 1) Points; 2) Goal difference; 3) Number of goals scored. After abandonment of season: 1) Points per game

== Women's FA Cup ==
As a member of the top two tiers, Everton entered the FA Cup in the fourth round, beating Championship side London Bees in their opening fixture. On 24 July 2020 it was announced the 2019–20 FA Cup would resume play during the 2020–21 season starting with the quarter-final ties rescheduled for the weekend of 26/27 September 2020. Everton reached the final for the first time since 2014.

| 26 January 2020 Fourth round | Everton | 1–0 | London Bees | Southport |
| | Kaagman 45' | Report | | Stadium: Haig Avenue |

| 17 February 2020 Fifth round | Bristol City | 0–5 | Everton | Bristol |
| | | Report | Kaagman 8', 53'; Morgan 18'; Graham 39'; Cain 59' | Stadium: Ashton Gate; Attendance: 1,889 |

| 15 March 2020 Quarter-final | Everton | P–P | Chelsea | Liverpool |
| | | | | Stadium: Walton Hall Park |
Note: Postponed due to coronavirus pandemic

| 27 September 2020 Quarter-final | Everton | 2–1 | Chelsea | Liverpool |
| 13:00 | Graham 40'; Christiansen (yellow card) 51'; Gauvin 63' | Report | Cuthbert 5' | Stadium: Goodison Park; Attendance: Behind-closed-doors; Referee: Simon Mather |
Note: Rescheduled from 15 March 2020

| 30 September 2020 Semi-final | Birmingham City | 0–3 | Everton | Solihull |
| 19:15 | Scott (yellow card) 29'; Murray (yellow card) 68' | Report | Magill 44'; Sørensen 60'; Gauvin 87' | Stadium: Damson Park; Attendance: Behind-closed-doors; Referee: Amy Fearns |

| 1 November 2020 Final | Everton | 1–3 (a.e.t.) | Manchester City | London |
| 14:30 | Raso (yellow card) 25'; Gauvin 60' | Report | Bronze (yellow card) 16'; Mewis 40'; Stanway (yellow card) 82', (goal) 111'; Beckie 120+2' | Stadium: Wembley Stadium; Attendance: Behind-closed-doors; Referee: Rebecca Welch |

== FA Women's League Cup ==
=== Group stage ===
| 22 September 2019 Group stage | Birmingham City | 1–0 | Everton | Solihull |
| 14:00 | Williams 73' | Report | Kelly (yellow card) 45+2'; van Es (yellow card) 56' | Stadium: Damson Park; Attendance: 511; Referee: Lucy Oliver |

| 3 November 2019 Group stage | Everton | 0–3 | Manchester United | Southport |
| 12:30 | Kelly (yellow card) 63' (yellow-red card) 90+4'; Morgan (yellow card) 74' | Report | James 22'; A. Turner (yellow card) 72', (goal) 86'; Zelem 79' (pen.); Sigsworth (yellow card) 90+3' | Stadium: Haig Avenue; Attendance: 361; Referee: Rebecca Welsh |

| 21 November 2019 Group stage | Everton | 1–4 | Manchester City | Crosby |
| 19:30 | Pike 48' | Report | Beckie 36'; Wullaert 50'; Bonner 65'; Hemp 86' | Stadium: Rossett Park; Attendance: 327; Referee: Philip Jones |

| 11 December 2019 Group stage | Leicester City | 0–4 | Everton | Quorn |
| 19:45 | | Report | Boye-Hlorkah 44'; Hughes 46'; Hinds 52'; Kaagman 85' | Stadium: Farley Way Stadium; Attendance: 342; Referee: Amy Fearn |

| Pos | Team | Pld | W | WPEN | LPEN | L | GF | GA | GD | Pts | Qualification | MNU | MCI | BIR | EVE | LEI |
|---|---|---|---|---|---|---|---|---|---|---|---|---|---|---|---|---|
| 1 | Manchester United | 4 | 4 | 0 | 0 | 0 | 19 | 2 | +17 | 12 | Advance to knock-out stage | — | 2–0 | — | — | 11–1 |
| 2 | Manchester City | 4 | 3 | 0 | 0 | 1 | 11 | 4 | +7 | 9 | Advance to knock-out stage | — | — | 2–1 | — | 5–0 |
| 3 | Birmingham City | 4 | 2 | 0 | 0 | 2 | 8 | 6 | +2 | 6 | | 1–3 | — | — | 1–0 | — |
| 4 | Everton | 4 | 1 | 0 | 0 | 3 | 5 | 8 | −3 | 3 | | 0–3 | 1–4 | — | — | — |
| 5 | Leicester City | 4 | 0 | 0 | 0 | 4 | 2 | 25 | −23 | 0 | | — | — | 1–5 | 0–4 | — |

Updated to match(es) played on 11 December 2019. Source: thefa.com
Rules for classification: 1) Points; 2) Goal difference; 3) Number of goals scored; 4) Number of wins; 5) Head-to-head record

== Squad statistics ==
=== Appearances ===
Starting appearances are listed first, followed by substitute appearances after the + symbol where applicable.

| No. | Pos | Nat | Player | Total | | FA WSL | | FA Cup | | League Cup | |
| No. | Pos | Nat | Player | Apps | Goals | Apps | Goals | Apps | Goals | Apps | Goals |
|---|---|---|---|---|---|---|---|---|---|---|---|
| 1 | GK | (England) ENG | Kirstie Levell | 3 | 0 | 0 | 0 | 0 | 0 | 3 | 0 |
| 2 | DF | (England) ENG | Taylor Hinds | 11 | 1 | 2+4 | 0 | 1 | 0 | 3+1 | 1 |
| 3 | DF | (England) ENG | Danielle Turner | 22 | 1 | 14 | 1 | 4+1 | 0 | 3 | 0 |
| 5 | DF | (Netherlands) NED | Kika van Es | 14 | 0 | 8+2 | 0 | 0+2 | 0 | 1+1 | 0 |
| 6 | DF | (England) ENG | Gabrielle George | 17 | 0 | 13 | 0 | 2 | 0 | 2 | 0 |
| 7 | FW | (England) ENG | Chantelle Boye-Hlorkah | 18 | 1 | 6+4 | 0 | 3+2 | 0 | 2+1 | 1 |
| 8 | MF | (Netherlands) NED | Inessa Kaagman | 18 | 5 | 12 | 1 | 2 | 3 | 2+2 | 1 |
| 9 | FW | (Wales) WAL | Elise Hughes | 8 | 1 | 1+3 | 0 | 0 | 0 | 3+1 | 1 |
| 10 | FW | (Northern Ireland) NIR | Simone Magill | 16 | 1 | 10+2 | 0 | 3+1 | 1 | 0 | 0 |
| 11 | FW | (England) ENG | Chloe Kelly | 18 | 9 | 12 | 9 | 2 | 0 | 3+1 | 0 |
| 12 | FW | (Australia) AUS | Hayley Raso | 3 | 0 | 0 | 0 | 2+1 | 0 | 0 | 0 |
| 13 | MF | (England) ENG | Abbey-Leigh Stringer | 18 | 0 | 5+6 | 0 | 2+3 | 0 | 2 | 0 |
| 14 | DF | (England) ENG | Esme Morgan | 15 | 2 | 10+1 | 1 | 2 | 1 | 2 | 0 |
| 15 | MF | (England) ENG | Molly Pike | 21 | 2 | 7+6 | 1 | 0+4 | 0 | 2+2 | 1 |
| 16 | FW | (England) ENG | Hannah Cain | 18 | 1 | 5+8 | 0 | 1 | 1 | 3+1 | 0 |
| 17 | MF | (Scotland) SCO | Lucy Graham | 22 | 6 | 14 | 4 | 5 | 2 | 2+1 | 0 |
| 18 | GK | (England) ENG | Sandy MacIver | 7 | 0 | 3 | 0 | 4 | 0 | 0 | 0 |
| 20 | MF | (England) ENG | Megan Finnigan | 18 | 0 | 10 | 0 | 5 | 0 | 3 | 0 |
| 21 | MF | (France) FRA | Maéva Clémaron | 18 | 0 | 11+2 | 0 | 2 | 0 | 3 | 0 |
| 23 | GK | (Finland) FIN | Tinja-Riikka Korpela | 13 | 0 | 11 | 0 | 1 | 0 | 1 | 0 |
| 25 | DF | (England) ENG | Hannah Coan | 1 | 0 | 0 | 0 | 0 | 0 | 1 | 0 |
| 27 | MF | (England) ENG | Izzy Christiansen | 3 | 0 | 0 | 0 | 3 | 0 | 0 | 0 |
| – | DF | (England) ENG | Aimee Kelly | 1 | 0 | 0 | 0 | 0 | 0 | 1 | 0 |
Joined during 2020–21 season but competed in the postponed 2019–20 FA Cup:
| 2 | DF | (Norway) NOR | Ingrid Moe Wold | 3 | 0 | 0 | 0 | 3 | 0 | 0 | 0 |
| 12 | MF | (Spain) ESP | Damaris Egurrola | 3 | 0 | 0 | 0 | 1+2 | 0 | 0 | 0 |
| 14 | FW | (Denmark) DEN | Nicoline Sørensen | 3 | 1 | 0 | 0 | 3 | 1 | 0 | 0 |
| 19 | MF | (France) FRA | Valérie Gauvin | 3 | 3 | 0 | 0 | 1+2 | 3 | 0 | 0 |
| 22 | DF | (Denmark) DEN | Rikke Sevecke | 3 | 0 | 0 | 0 | 3 | 0 | 0 | 0 |
| 30 | DF | (England) ENG | Poppy Pattinson | 1 | 0 | 0 | 0 | 0+1 | 0 | 0 | 0 |
Players away from the club on loan:
| 4 | DF | (England) ENG | Georgia Brougham | 2 | 0 | 0 | 0 | 0 | 0 | 2 | 0 |
Players who appeared for Everton but left during the season:
| 22 | DF | (England) ENG | Faye Bryson | 1 | 0 | 0 | 0 | 0 | 0 | 1 | 0 |

=== Goalscorers ===
| Rank | No. | Pos. | Name | FA WSL | FA Cup | League Cup | Total |
|---|---|---|---|---|---|---|---|
| 1 | 11 | FW | (England) Chloe Kelly | 9 | 0 | 0 | 9 |
| 2 | 17 | MF | (Scotland) Lucy Graham | 4 | 2 | 0 | 6 |
| 3 | 8 | MF | (Netherlands) Inessa Kaagman | 1 | 3 | 1 | 5 |
| 4 | 19 | FW | (France) Valérie Gauvin (Note: Joined during 2020–21 season but scored in the postponed 2019–20 FA Cup) | 0 | 3 | 0 | 3 |
| 5 | 14 | DF | (England) Esme Morgan | 1 | 1 | 0 | 2 |
| 5 | 15 | MF | (England) Molly Pike | 1 | 0 | 1 | 2 |
| 7 | 2 | DF | (England) Taylor Hinds | 0 | 0 | 1 | 1 |
| 7 | 3 | DF | (England) Danielle Turner | 1 | 0 | 0 | 1 |
| 7 | 7 | FW | (England) Chantelle Boye-Hlorkah | 0 | 0 | 1 | 1 |
| 7 | 9 | FW | (Wales) Elise Hughes | 0 | 0 | 1 | 1 |
| 7 | 10 | FW | (Northern Ireland) Simone Magill | 0 | 1 | 0 | 1 |
| 7 | 14 | FW | (Denmark) Nicoline Sørensen | 0 | 1 | 0 | 1 |
| 7 | 16 | FW | (England) Hannah Cain | 0 | 1 | 0 | 1 |
| Own goal | | | | 4 | 0 | 0 | 4 |
| Total | | | | 21 | 12 | 5 | 38 |

== Transfers ==
=== Transfers in ===
| Date | Position | Nationality | Name | From | Ref. |
|---|---|---|---|---|---|
| 1 July 2019 | DF | (Netherlands) | Kika van Es | (Netherlands) Ajax | |
| 2 July 2019 | GK | (Finland) | Tinja-Riikka Korpela | (Norway) Vålerenga | |
| 4 July 2019 | MF | (Scotland) | Lucy Graham | (England) Bristol City | |
| 4 July 2019 | MF | (England) | Molly Pike | (England) Chelsea | |
| 11 July 2019 | MF | (France) | Maéva Clémaron | (France) Fleury 91 | |
| 27 December 2019 | MF | (England) | Izzy Christiansen | (France) Olympique Lyon | |
| 2 January 2020 | GK | (England) | Sandy MacIver | (United States) Clemson Tigers | |
| 17 January 2020 | FW | (Australia) | Hayley Raso | (United States) Portland Thorns | |

=== Loans in ===
| Date | Position | Nationality | Name | From | Until | Ref. |
|---|---|---|---|---|---|---|
| 16 August 2019 | DF | (England) | Esme Morgan | (England) Manchester City | End of season | |

=== Transfers out ===
| Date | Position | Nationality | Name | To | Ref. |
|---|---|---|---|---|---|
| 23 May 2019 | MF | (New Zealand) | Olivia Chance | (England) Bristol City | |
| 24 May 2019 | GK | (Northern Ireland) | Becky Flaherty | (England) Sheffield United | |
| 31 May 2019 | DF | (Scotland) | Emma Brownlie | (Scotland) Rangers | |
| 3 June 2019 | FW | (England) | Claudia Walker | (England) Birmingham City | |
| 30 June 2019 | MF | (Netherlands) | Dominique Bruinenberg | (Netherlands) PEC Zwolle | |
| 5 July 2019 | DF | (Netherlands) | Siri Worm | (England) Tottenham Hotspur | |
| 17 July 2019 | MF | (Wales) | Angharad James | (England) Reading | |
| 18 January 2020 | DF | (England) | Faye Bryson | (England) Bristol City | |

=== Loans out ===
| Date | Position | Nationality | Name | To | Until | Ref. |
|---|---|---|---|---|---|---|
| 4 January 2020 | FW | (Wales) | Elise Hughes | (England) Bristol City | 30 January 2020 | |
| 10 January 2020 | DF | (England) | Georgia Brougham | (England) Birmingham City | End of season | |
