= 2020 FA Cup =

2020 FA Cup may refer to:

- 2019–20 FA Cup
  - 2020 FA Cup final
- 2019–20 Women's FA Cup
  - 2020 Women's FA Cup final
- 2020–21 FA Cup
- 2020–21 Women's FA Cup
