= 2017 FA Cup =

2017 FA Cup may refer to:

- 2016–17 FA Cup
  - 2017 FA Cup final
- 2016–17 FA Women's Cup
  - 2017 FA Women's Cup final
- 2017–18 FA Cup
- 2017–18 FA Women's Cup
