= Gabby George =

English footballer

- George with Manchester United in 2025

Personal information
- Full name: Gabrielle Alishya George
- Date of birth: 2 February 1997 (age 29)
- Place of birth: Manchester, England
- Height: 1.71 m (5 ft 7 in)
- Positions: Centre-back; left-back

Team information
- Current team: Brighton & Hove Albion
- Number: 6

Youth career
- 2006–2011: Blackpool
- 2011–2014: Manchester United

Senior career*
Years	Team	Apps	(Gls)
2014–2023	Everton	110	(4)
2023–2026	Manchester United	35	(0)
2026–	Brighton & Hove Albion	6	(2)

International career^{‡}
2013	England U-17	14	(0)
2014–2016	England U-19	22	(2)
2014–2016	England U-20	4	(0)
2019	England U-21	2	(1)
2018–	England	3	(0)
- * Club domestic league appearances and goals as of 14 November 2026 ‡ National team caps and goals as of 3 December 2024

Gabrielle Alishya George (born 2 February 1997) is an English professional footballer who plays as a centre-back or left-back for Women's Super League club Brighton & Hove Albion.

== Club career ==
=== Early career ===
George began playing football with boys at the age of nine. George spent her youth development with Blackpool girls and Manchester United's Centre of Excellence.

=== Everton ===
George began her career at Everton in 2014. In April 2014, she made her first team debut against Notts County. George made 14 appearances for the Blues during her first season, including a start in the 2014 FA Women's Cup Final, despite being just 17 years of age. The same year, she was named Player of The FA Women's Cup Sixth Round after helping Everton shut out previous champions Liverpool 2–0. After defeating Notts County 2–1 in the semifinals, Everton lost the final to Arsenal 2–0 in the Final in front of over 15,000 fans.

George made club history in 2017 when she signed a two-year contract as Everton's first full-time professional player.

=== Manchester United ===
On 14 September 2023, Manchester United announced the signing of George. The club reportedly met her £150,000 release clause. George immediately became the team's starting left-back, starting the opening match of the season. On 10 October 2023, George made her Champions League debut in the club's first European match, a 1–1 draw with Paris Saint-Germain in the second qualifying round first leg. On 15 October 2023, George suffered an anterior cruciate ligament injury during a WSL match against Leicester City, ruling her out for the remainder of the season after four appearances. It was the second time she had suffered the injury in her career, having previously done it in February 2020. She made her return to the pitch in the first WSL match of the following season against West Ham on 20 September 2024.

=== Brighton & Hove Albion ===
On 6 August 2026, George signed for Brighton & Hove Albion.

== International career ==
George has represented England at the U-17, U-19, U-20, and U-21 levels, playing in one U-20 World Cup and two European finals.

In 2017, George earned her first call-up to the senior team for the 2017 SheBelieves Cup in the United States. She made her debut on 4 September 2018 in a 6–0 victory over Kazakhstan in a World Cup qualifier.

George has legacy number 206 for England. The FA announced their legacy numbers scheme to honour the 50th anniversary of England’s inaugural international.

On 3 December 2024, George made her first appearance for England in six years, playing 63 minutes in a friendly match against Switzerland.

== Personal life ==
George's cousin, Jesse Lingard, formerly played for Manchester United and England.

== Career statistics ==
=== Club ===
As of match played 18 November 2026

Appearances and goals by club, season and competition
Club	Season	League			FA Cup		League Cup		Continental		Total	
Club	Season	Division	Apps	Goals	Apps	Goals	Apps	Goals	Apps	Goals	Apps	Goals
Everton	2014	WSL 1	10	0	3	0	2	0	—		15	0
Everton	2015	WSL 2			2	1	3	0	—		5	1
Everton	2016	WSL 2			1	0	1	0	—		2	0
Everton	2017	WSL 2	9	1	1	0	—		—		10	1
Everton	2017–18	WSL	18	0	2	0	5	0	—		25	0
Everton	2018–19	WSL	16	1	1	0	4	0	—		21	1
Everton	2019–20	WSL	13	0	2	0	2	0	—		17	0
Everton	2020–21	WSL	7	0	2	0	0	0	—		9	0
Everton	2021–22	WSL	21	0	3	0	4	0	—		28	0
Everton	2022–23	WSL	16	2	1	0	3	0	—		20	2
Everton	Total		110	4	18	1	24	0	0	0	152	5
Manchester United	2023–24	WSL	3	0	0	0	0	0	1 (Note: Appearances in UEFA Women's Champions League)	0	4	0
Manchester United	2024–25	WSL	19	0	5	0	2	1	—		26	1
Manchester United	2025–26	WSL	13	0	1	0	0	0	10	0	24	0
Manchester United	Total		35	0	6	0	2	1	11	0	54	1
Brighton & Hove Albion	2026–27	WSL	6	2	0	0	4	0	—		10	2
Career total			151	6	24	1	30	1	11	0	216	8

=== International ===
As of match played 3 December 2024

Appearances and goals by national team and year
National team	Year	Apps	Goals
England	2018	2	0
England	2024	1	0
Total		3	0

== Honours ==
Everton

- FA WSL 2: 2017
- Women's FA Cup runners-up: 2014, 2020

Manchester United

- Women's FA Cup runners-up: 2024–25
- Women's League Cup runners-up: 2025–26

Individual

- WSL Player of the Month: January 2023
- UEFA Women's Under-17 Championship Team of the Tournament: 2014
- North West Rising Star: 2015
- FA Women's Cup Player of the Round: 2014
- Everton Women’s Player of the Season: 2021–22
- Everton Supporters Player of the Season: 2017–18, 2021–22
