= Ambassadeurs (musician) =

English electronic music producer

- Born: Mark Dobson
- Origin: Brighton, England
- Genres: Electronica; IDM; Bass music
- Occupations: Record producer; DJ; Mastering engineer
- Years active: c. 2011–present
- Labels: Pilot; Lost Tribe Records; Phases
- Website: ambassadeurs.bandcamp.com

Mark Dobson, known professionally as Ambassadeurs, is an English electronic music producer, DJ and mastering engineer based in Brighton. He released EPs on Pilot before founding his own label, Lost Tribe Records, which issued his debut album Patterns in 2015. His second album, Human Stranger, followed on Phases in 2020.

== Early life ==
Dobson grew up in Worthing. He began making music at a young age on a Commodore Amiga using the tracker program OctaMED. He played guitar in bands and bass in a jazz band, and later learned piano. He became interested in production through recording the bands he played in. He has said he discovered early Warp and Ninja Tune releases, by artists such as Aphex Twin, Squarepusher and Amon Tobin, in his teens.

== Career ==
=== 2011–2014: Early EPs ===
His self-titled EP was reviewed by the Brighton magazine Source in June 2011. The Come a Little Closer EP was released by Jalapeno Records in October 2011. XLR8R premiered the video for "M.O.P.E." in February 2012, and later that year described his single "My World" as drawing on trap and footwork without settling on either. His six-track Trouble EP was released on Pilot in July 2013, with XLR8R premiering the title track, and his second Pilot EP, Alone in the Light, was released on 30 September 2013. Ahead of that release, Clash premiered the free download "HyperColor", noting that his YouTube channel had passed one million views. In November 2013 he recorded a guest mix for Clash, featuring tracks by Rustie, Machinedrum and Martyn.

In December 2013 his single "Make Me" was premiered by the then-new Thump UK channel. Dobson launched Lost Tribe Records with a vinyl-only release of his own. In October 2014 he supported ODESZA on their North American tour, including a date at First Avenue in Minneapolis.

=== 2015–2016: Patterns and Halos ===
In March 2015 The Fader premiered "Can't You See", the title track of an EP released that April. The EP came out on Lost Tribe Records, and Earmilk premiered its track "My Way" ahead of his first US appearance, at the Lightning in a Bottle festival.

His debut album Patterns, a twelve-track record, was released on Lost Tribe on 29 June 2015. It featured the Scottish musician C Duncan on the single "Looking at You", which Clash premiered. Noisey ran a feature on the album at its release. The record was also reviewed by the Italian edition of Vice. In July 2015 Huw Stephens featured Patterns as the album in the "It's Album Time" segment of his BBC Radio 1 show, playing "Crimson", "Can't You See" and "Breathe", which features the singer Folly Rae.

He followed it with the Halos EP, written during an autumn stay in the countryside, which moved towards a more four-on-the-floor sound than the album. Around the same time he remixed Ninja Tune artist Autograf. His remix work also included tracks by Kraak & Smaak, Nostalgia 77, Villette, Marvin Gaye and the Dominican singer-songwriter Alex Ferreira.

Over this period Dobson supported acts including ODESZA, Machinedrum, The Gaslamp Killer, Danny Brown, Gold Panda, Daedelus and Kelpe, co-headlined a 15-date North American tour with Daktyl, and played festivals including Hard Day of the Dead and the Brooklyn Electronic Music Festival. His music received airplay on BBC Radio 1 from Monki, Huw Stephens and Phil Taggart.

=== 2019–present: Human Stranger and later work ===
In 2019 Future Music ran a four-page production breakdown of his single "Nocturnes", recorded at his studio in South London. The track was built around a cut-up sample of Japanese folk music, and was produced in Logic Pro using layered software synthesisers and samples from the Freesound library.

Human Stranger, an eight-track album, was released on Phases in September 2020. Reviewing it for Backseat Mafia, Chris Sawle described it as a set of "majorly uplifting, humanist floor-fillers". A Closer Listen included it in its autumn 2020 electronic preview, describing it as a progressive house record that grew out of personal loss.

Dobson also works as a mastering engineer at Coda Mastering.

== Musical style ==
Future Music described Dobson's music as a hybrid of house, techno, dub and hip-hop with soundtrack and Foley elements. Dobson himself prefers the broader label "electronica". The Ransom Note compared his left field, bass-heavy output to Salva and XXYYXX. His live show for Patterns paired his music with surrealist video.

== Discography ==
=== Studio albums ===
- Patterns (2015, Lost Tribe Records)
- Human Stranger (2020, Phases)

=== EPs (selected) ===
- Ambassadeurs (2011)
- Come a Little Closer (2011, Jalapeno Records)
- Trouble (2013, Pilot)
- Alone in the Light (2013, Pilot)
- Can't You See (2015, Lost Tribe Records)
- M.O.P.E (2014, Lost Tribe Records)
- Halos (2016, Lost Tribe Records)
