= Monki (DJ) =

English DJ and footballer

Lucy Monkman, also known as Monki, is an English DJ and footballer who has played for Dulwich Hamlet as a forward.

== Early life ==
Monki grew up in south London.

== Music career ==
Monki started her career at a work experience placement with Radio Jackie before interning with Rinse FM. After that, she worked as a DJ for Radio 1. In the process, she became the first East Asian to have a Radio 1 show. She has also worked as a mix curator for Fabric.

Monki has toured in Europe and America, and has played at Creamfields, Parklife, and Glastonbury. She has launched her own label, &Friends. In 2020, she released single Queen of Hearts on her &Friends label.

She was chosen to join pundit Jermain Defoe, former footballer and content creator Moses Duckrell and semi-pro footballer Freda Ayisi to endorse marketing by Jameson Irish Whiskey to five-a-side players.

== Football career ==
=== Youth career ===
As a youth player, Monki participated in her first football camp at a local team, where she was the only girl. As a teenager, she stopped playing competitive football before playing it again after eight years, when she was in her early twenties.

=== Senior career ===
Monki has played for Dulwich Hamlet. She has had a football podcast, Football Inside Out. In 2021, she was invited to be on the This Fan Girl podcast.

== Personal life ==
Monki is of East Asian descent through her mother. She is a supporter of English club Arsenal.
