= Molly Pike =

English footballer

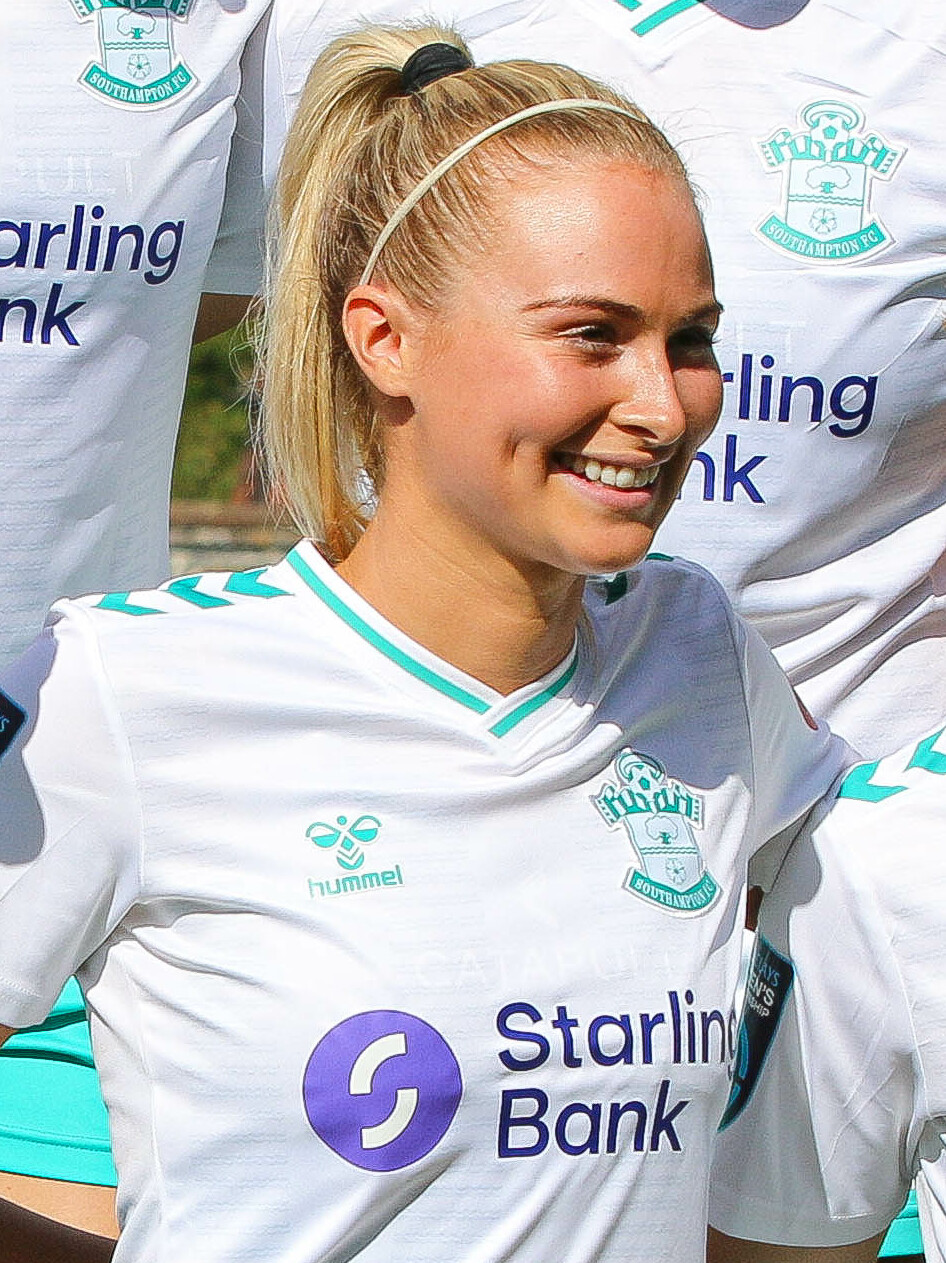

Personal information
- Full name: Molly Pike
- Date of birth: 22 January 2001 (age 25)
- Place of birth: England
- Height: 1.75 m (5 ft 9 in)
- Position: Midfielder

Youth career
- -2019: Chelsea

Senior career*
| Years | Team | Apps | (Gls) |
| 2019–2021 | Everton | 17 | (1) |
| 2021 | → Bristol City (loan) | 11 | (0) |
| 2021–2023 | Leicester City | 39 | (0) |
| 2023–2025 | Southampton | 27 | (9) |
| 2025–2026 | Newcastle United | 21 | (3) |

International career^{‡}
| 2017–2018 | England U17 | 3 | (0) |
| 2018 | England U18 | 2 | (0) |
| 2019–2020 | England U19 | 9 | (1) |
| 2021– | England U23 | 5 | (0) |
- * Club domestic league appearances and goals as of 12 December 2025 ‡ National team caps and goals as of 30 October 2023

Molly Pike (born 22 January 2001) is an English former professional footballer who played as a midfielder.

Pike spent her youth years at Chelsea and has captained the England U19 team.

== Club career ==
Pike rose through the youth ranks at Chelsea, scoring 14 goals in 17 appearances as Chelsea finished runners-up in the 2018–19 WSL Academy League season.

In July 2019, Pike moved to Everton and signed her first professional contract. She made her senior debut on the 15 September 2019 against Bristol City in a 2–0 league win. She scored her first goal for the team on 21 November 2019 in a 4–1 defeat to Manchester City during the 2019–20 FA Women's League Cup group stage. Three days later she scored her first WSL, the opener in a 3–1 win at home to Tottenham Hotspur. She made a total of 21 appearances in her debut season including as a stoppage time substitute in the 2020 Women's FA Cup Final at Wembley Stadium as Everton lost 3–1 to Manchester City in extra-time.

With her game time limited to six appearances including only one start during the first half of the 2020–21 season, on 28 January 2021 Pike joined WSL team Bristol City on loan for the rest of the season.

On 4 July 2021 Pike signed with newly promoted Leicester City ahead of their first season in the FA WSL.

Pike moved to south coast side Southampton in July 2023 ahead of their second season in the Championship. On 1 July 2025 it was announced Pike was departing the club upon the expiry of her contract at the end of the 2024-25 season, having made 51 appearances and scored 13 goals during her time at the club.

On 2 May 2026, Pike announced her retirement from professional football due to personal reasons.

== International career ==
Pike has captained the England U19 team.

== Career statistics ==
=== Club ===
As of match played 13 October 2024.

Appearances and goals by club, season and competition
| Club | Season | League | | | FA Cup | | League Cup | | Total | |
| Club | Season | Division | Apps | Goals | Apps | Goals | Apps | Goals | Apps | Goals |
|---|---|---|---|---|---|---|---|---|---|---|
| Everton | 2019–20 | Women's Super League | 13 | 1 | 4 | 0 | 4 | 1 | 21 | 2 |
| Everton | 2020–21 | Women's Super League | 4 | 0 | 0 | 0 | 2 | 0 | 6 | 0 |
| Everton | Total | | 17 | 1 | 4 | 0 | 6 | 1 | 27 | 2 |
| Bristol City (loan) | 2020–21 | Women's Super League | 11 | 0 | 1 | 0 | 0 | 0 | 12 | 0 |
| Leicester City | 2021–22 | Women's Super League | 21 | 0 | 3 | 0 | 3 | 1 | 27 | 1 |
| Leicester City | 2022–23 | Women's Super League | 18 | 0 | 1 | 0 | 3 | 2 | 21 | 2 |
| Leicester City | Total | | 39 | 0 | 4 | 0 | 6 | 3 | 48 | 3 |
| Southampton F.C. | 2023–24 | Women's Championship | 22 | 7 | 2 | 0 | 2 | 1 | 26 | 8 |
| Southampton F.C. | 2024–25 | Women's Championship | 5 | 2 | 0 | 0 | 1 | 0 | 6 | 2 |
| Southampton F.C. | Total | | 27 | 9 | 2 | 0 | 3 | 1 | 32 | 10 |
| Newcastle United | 2025-26 | Women's Super League 2 | 11 | 3 | 0 | 0 | 2 | 0 | 13 | 3 |
| Newcastle United | Total | | 11 | 3 | 0 | 0 | 2 | 0 | 13 | 3 |
| Career total | | | 105 | 13 | 11 | 0 | 17 | 5 | 133 | 18 |
