= Freda Ayisi =

Ghanaian footballer and content creator (born 1994)

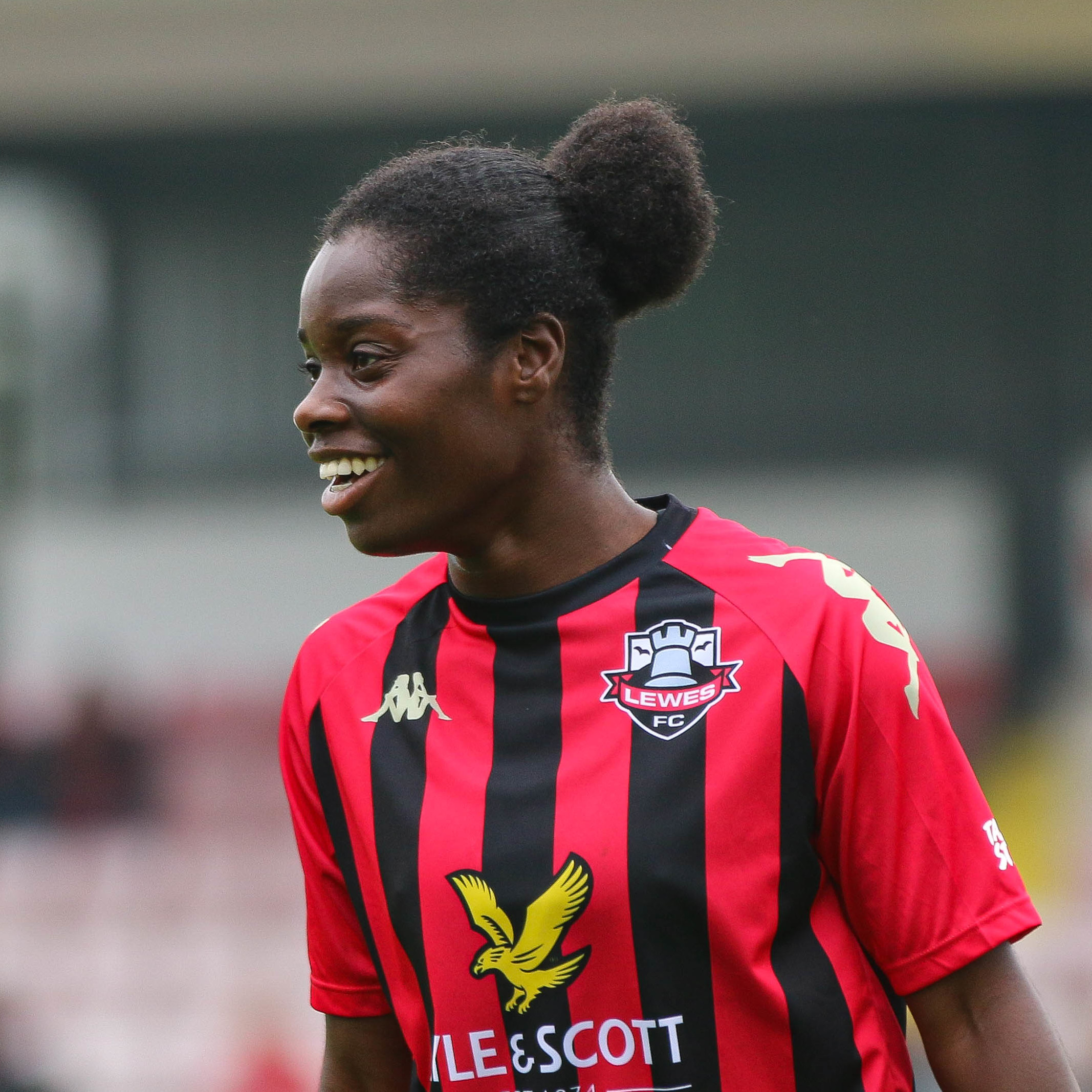
- Ayisi playing for Lewes in 2021

Personal information
- Date of birth: 21 October 1994 (age 32)
- Place of birth: London, England
- Position: Midfielder

Team information
- Current team: AFC Wimbledon

Senior career*
Years	Team	Apps	(Gls)
2013–2014	Arsenal	16	(1)
2014–2018	Birmingham City	40	(4)
2018–2019	Leicester City	15	(4)
2019–2021	London City Lionesses	19	(6)
2021–2022	Lewes	17	(7)
2022–2024	Charlton Athletic	39	(8)
2024–2025	Hashtag United	9	(5)
2025–2026	Watford	18	(10)
2026–	AFC Wimbledon	0	(0)

International career
2024–	Ghana	2	(0)
- * Club domestic league appearances and goals

Freda Ayisi (born 21 October 1994) is an English-born Ghanaian footballer and content creator who plays as a midfielder for AFC Wimbledon and the Ghana national team.

Ayisi came through the Arsenal academy and won the 2013–14 FA Women's Cup with the club, having scored her first senior goal in the UEFA Women's Champions League earlier that season. She spent four years with Birmingham City, reaching the 2017 FA Women's Cup final at Wembley Stadium, and has since played for Leicester City, London City Lionesses, Lewes, Charlton Athletic, Hashtag United and Watford. She made her senior international debut for Ghana in February 2024.

Ayisi is also among the most widely followed football content creators in Britain. Videos of her ball-control and trick-shot routines, many of them built on skills she developed on a Clapham council estate, drew a following of several million across TikTok, Instagram and YouTube after she began posting during the COVID-19 pandemic, and earned her a comparison in The Athletic to Dimitar Berbatov.

== Early life ==
Ayisi was born on 21 October 1994 and raised in south-west London, the youngest of six children of Ghanaian parents. (Note: DARBY describes Ayisi as "born and raised in South West London" and GhanaSoccerNet refers to her as "English-born". An earlier account gave her birthplace as Ghana.)

She grew up on a council estate in Clapham and began playing at the age of four, following her older brother and cousins to the local pitch. Her cousin Benji took charge of her training, and she learned ball work and kick-ups alongside the neighbourhood boys, who were instructed not to make allowances for her. She studied Ronaldinho's highlights on YouTube and practised his tricks on the balcony and stairwell landings of her family's flat.

By eight she had been selected for her primary school's boys' team and had joined Charlton Athletic's under-8 side; at 11 she was granted an exemption to play for South London Boys FC. When the age limit for girls in mixed tournaments was lowered from 13 to 11, she continued to play by tying back her hair and using the name "Fred".

Ayisi left Charlton at 13 after she and her brother were racially abused by the occupants of a passing car near the club's training ground in Eltham. She has said the club did not deal with the incident to her satisfaction and that she no longer felt safe travelling there, and that she declined a later approach from the club.

== Club career ==
=== Arsenal ===
Following trials arranged by her youth coach, Ayisi was signed by Arsenal and progressed from the academy through the reserves to the senior side, training alongside England internationals Rachel Yankey and Kelly Smith.

She scored her first senior goal on 9 October 2013 in a 7–1 win away to the Kazakh club CSHVSM-Kairat in the round of 32 of the 2013–14 UEFA Women's Champions League, played in Almaty; she later called it the highlight of her time at Arsenal. She was an unused substitute when Arsenal beat Everton 2–0 in the 2013–14 FA Women's Cup final.

=== Birmingham City ===
Ayisi joined Birmingham City in 2014 and made 57 appearances in all competitions over three seasons. In a goalless draw with Manchester City in March 2015, an altercation between Ayisi and goalkeeper Karen Bardsley led to Ayisi being sent off; Bardsley was subsequently banned for three matches for violent conduct and said she regretted the incident. Later that year she scored against Sunderland as Birmingham fought relegation, only for Sunderland to equalise.

Her most prominent match for the club was the 2017 FA Women's Cup final at Wembley Stadium, which Birmingham lost 4–1 to Manchester City after eliminating Chelsea and Arsenal en route.

=== Leicester City and London City Lionesses ===
In August 2018 Ayisi and Melissa Johnson joined Leicester City for the 2018–19 season. She then signed for London City Lionesses for their inaugural campaign as an independent club. The Lionesses were fourth in the 2019–20 FA Women's Championship when the season was curtailed by the COVID-19 pandemic.

=== Lewes and Charlton Athletic ===
Ayisi joined Lewes in July 2021, a club that in 2017 had become the first in the world to allocate equal playing budgets to its men's and women's teams.

She returned to Charlton Athletic in 2022, a decade after leaving the club as a teenager. In May 2023 she scored Charlton's goal in a draw with Crystal Palace in a match watched by Nora Häuptle, newly appointed as Ghana's head coach.

=== Hashtag United, Watford and AFC Wimbledon ===
In September 2024 Ayisi signed for Hashtag United, a club founded as a YouTube project by Spencer Owen and since established in the National League Southern Premier Division. She has said the move suited her because Owen understood the demands of combining playing with content creation; Hashtag won the FA Women's National League Cup during her season there.

She signed for Watford on 21 July 2025 and scored on her debut a month later, converting a penalty in the 52nd minute of a 7–0 National League Cup win over Charlton on 22 August. She joined AFC Wimbledon on 7 August 2026.

== International career ==
Eligible for Ghana through her parents, Ayisi was called up by Häuptle and made her debut for the Black Queens on 23 February 2024, starting as an attacking midfielder against Zambia in a 2024 Olympic qualifier. Ghana lost the tie 4–3 on aggregate, with Gifty Assifuah replacing Ayisi in the squad for the second leg.

== Content creation ==
Ayisi had watched football videos on YouTube since childhood but had no time to make her own until the 2020 lockdowns. She began filming the tricks she had grown up practising on her estate, among them "Attack the Block", a control drill in which she takes down a ball thrown from a fourth-floor balcony—a routine that began, she has said, as a way of avoiding the climb back up four flights of stairs.

Her profile grew sharply after Ian Wright shared one of her videos with his TikTok following; Ayisi replied individually to everyone who reacted to it. In January 2022 The Athletic described her as a "female Berbatov" for her touch and close control.

By 2023 she had around 560,000 followers across Instagram and TikTok; by 2025 the figure across TikTok, Instagram and YouTube exceeded four million. She posted every day across multiple platforms throughout 2024, and films and edits in bulk to fit the schedule around training. Her interview series Tekkers with Freda has featured guests including Marcelo, recorded at the 2025 Champions League final in Munich.

Ayisi filmed technical challenges with participants at Soccer Aid in 2023 and appeared alongside Jermain Defoe, Moses Duckrell and Monki in a Jameson Irish Whiskey campaign aimed at five-a-side players that year. She is an ambassador for World Vision UK, for which she has visited Ghana.

== Honours ==
Arsenal

- Women's FA Cup: 2013–14

Birmingham City

- Women's FA Cup runner-up: 2016–17

Hashtag United

- FA Women's National League Cup: 2024–25
