= Moses Duckrell =

English footballer

Personal information
- Full name: Moses Duckrell
- Date of birth: 13 August 1996 (age 30)
- Place of birth: London, England
- Position: Forward

Youth career
- -2015: Barnet

Senior career*
Years	Team	Apps	(Gls)
2015	BK Sport		
2015-2016	Livingston	0	(0)
2016-2017	Gottne IF		
2017	Piteå IF		
2017-2019	Friska Viljor		
2019-2020	Ytterhogdals IK		
2020	VPS		
- * Club domestic league appearances and goals as of 21:02, 28 December 2023 (UTC)

Moses Duckrell (born 13 August 1996) is an English former professional footballer who played as a forward for Barnet and Livingston.

== Club career ==
Duckrell began his career in the youth academy of Barnet but left the club in 2015 without having made a single first team appearance.

Following his departure from the Bees, Duckrell signed for Swedish side BK Sport in 2015 as part of an Erasmus+ placement.

In July 2015, Duckrell signed for Scottish side Livingston on a two-year deal following a successful trial. However he left the club in 2016 without making a single first team appearance.

Duckrell returned to Sweden in 2016 to sign for Gottne IF.

After less than a year with Gottne IF, Duckrell signed a one-year deal with Piteå IF.

In December 2017, Duckrell was on the move again and signed for Friska Viljor.

Following a short spell with Ytterhogdals IK, Duckrell signed for Finnish side VPS in 2020.

== Life after football ==
Since his playing career finished, Duckrell has become a social media content creator. In 2023, he fronted the launch of a new bib produced by Jameson Irish Whiskey and VERSUS, alongside Jermain Defoe, Freda Ayisi and Monki.
