= Esme Morgan =

English footballer (born 2000)

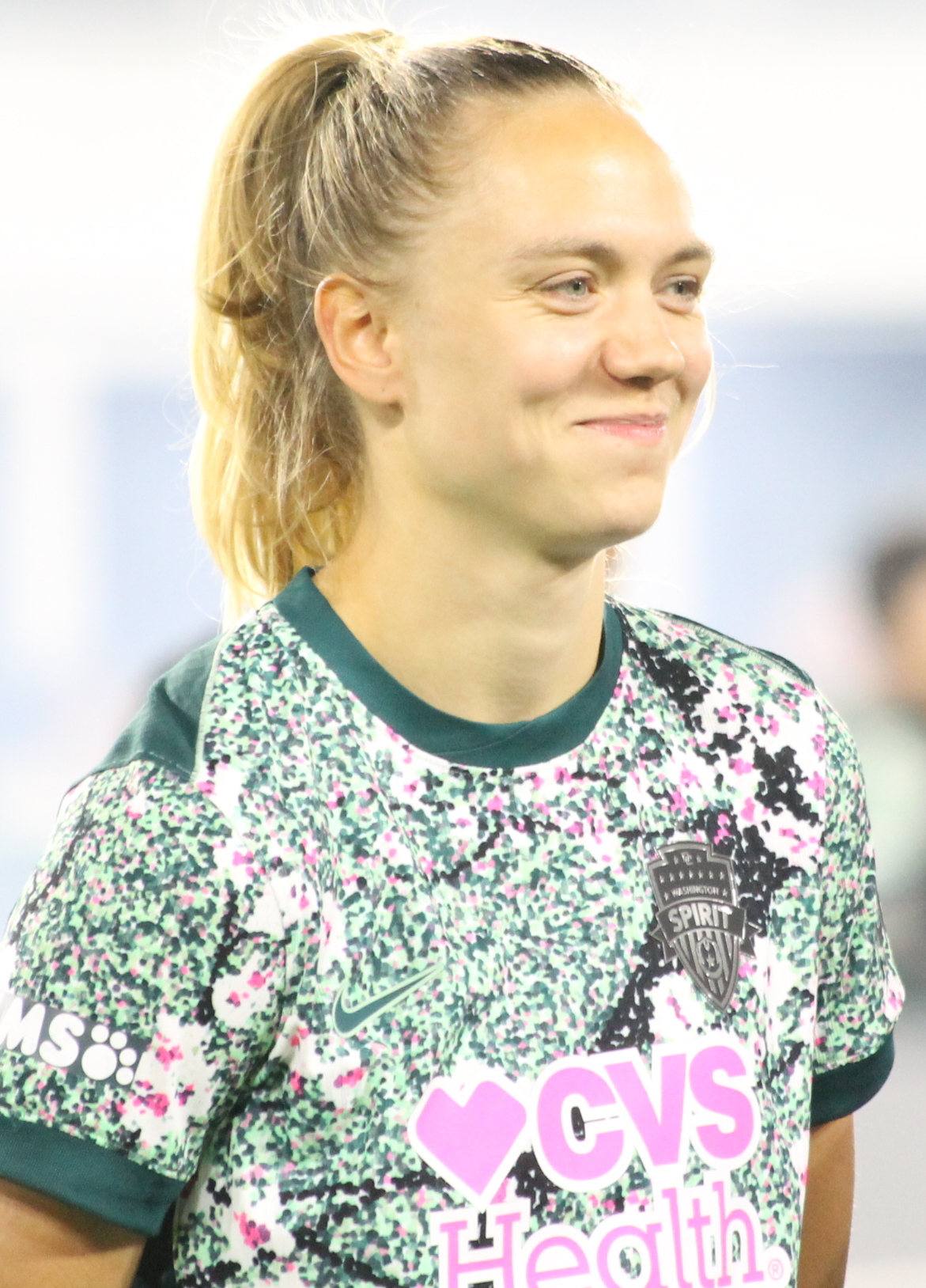
- Morgan with Washington Spirit, 2026

Personal information
- Full name: Esme Beth Morgan
- Date of birth: 18 October 2000 (age 26)
- Place of birth: Sheffield, England
- Height: 1.77 m (5 ft 10 in)
- Position: Centre-back

Team information
- Current team: Washington Spirit
- Number: 24

Youth career
- 2015–2017: Manchester City

Senior career*
Years	Team	Apps	(Gls)
2017–2024	Manchester City	53	(1)
2019–2020	→ Everton (loan)	11	(1)
2024–	Washington Spirit	59	(2)

International career^{‡}
2017–2018	England U17	6	(0)
2017–2019	England U19	18	(2)
2019	England U21	3	(0)
2022–	England	26	(0)
Medal record
Women's football
Representing England
UEFA Women's Championship
Winner	2025 Switzerland
UEFA–CONMEBOL Finalissima
Winner	2023 England
FIFA Women's World Cup
Runner-up	2023 Australia and New Zealand
- * Club domestic league appearances and goals as of 05:28, 15 November 2026 (UTC) ‡ National team caps and goals as of 00:10, 10 October 2026 (UTC)

Esme Beth Morgan (born 18 October 2000) is an English professional footballer who plays as a centre-back for National Women's Soccer League (NWSL) club Washington Spirit and the England national team.

Morgan made her senior debut for Manchester City at age 16 in 2017, playing six seasons for the club plus a loan spell at Everton. She then joined the Spirit in 2024.

Morgan made her senior debut for England in 2022. She was part of the England squads that reached the 2023 FIFA Women's World Cup final and won the UEFA Women's Euro 2025.

== Early life ==
Morgan began playing football aged 4 with Ecclesall Rangers boys team, remaining with the side until age 16. She also played for Worsbrough Bridge girls’ team.

== Club career ==
=== Manchester City ===
A product of Manchester City's youth team, Morgan signed her first professional contract with the club in June 2019. She had previously made her debut for the senior side in a league win against Yeovil Town on 24 September 2017. She spent the 2019–20 season on loan at Everton.

On 2 May 2021, in the 2020–21 season, Morgan scored her debut goal for City against Birmingham City in a 4–0 victory, assisted by Lauren Hemp in the 85th-minute.

In September 2021, Morgan suffered a lower leg fracture against Tottenham at Manchester City's Academy Stadium. She has since returned to the starting line-up for City.

On 18 January 2022, Morgan signed a three-year contract extension with City. On 6 November 2022, she captained her club for the first time in a 3–0 win over Reading.

On 27 May 2024, it was announced that Morgan would leave the club.

=== Washington Spirit ===
On 13 June 2024, it was announced that Morgan had signed for NWSL club Washington Spirit on a four-year deal, becoming eligible to play from 15 July. She made her debut for the club in a 3–0 victory against Houston Dash on 15 September. Morgan scored a brace in a 4-3 defeat to Angel City on 2 May 2025. Morgan started in all three of the Spirit's playoff matches in the 2024 season.

== International career ==
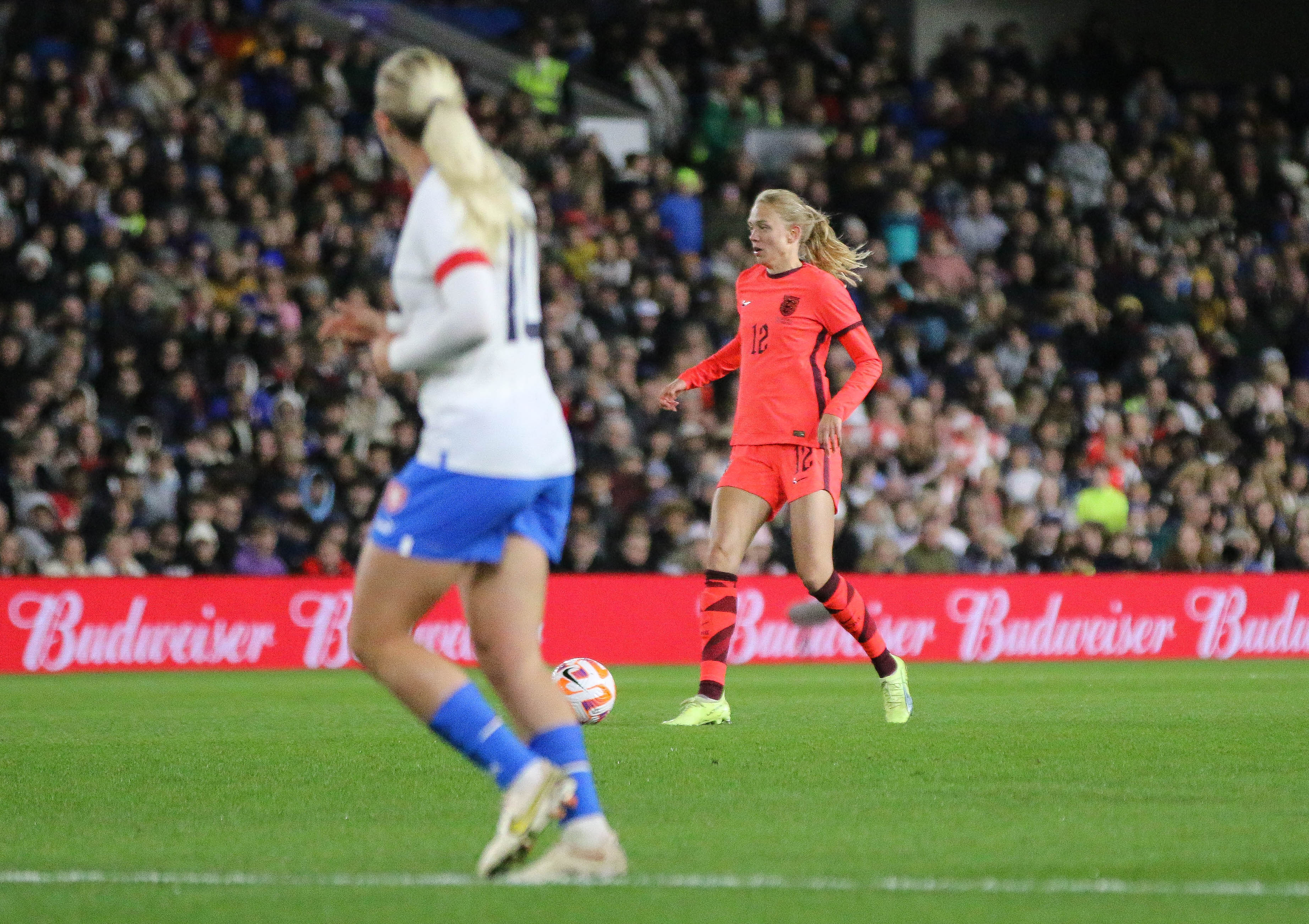
Morgan (right) on her senior international debut for England against Czech Republic, October 2022.

Morgan has been featured throughout all youth levels of the England national team set-up, since she was first called up to the under-17 team in 2017.

Morgan was called up to the senior England squad for a training camp in September 2020, before being out on injury from September 2021 to late 2022.

On 11 October 2022, Morgan won her first senior cap for the England national team when she made her debut as a half-time substitute in an international friendly against Czech Republic.

On 18 November 2022, her England legacy number was announced as number 224.

On 31 May 2023, Morgan was named to the squad for the 2023 FIFA Women's World Cup in July 2023, where she was an unused substitute in the tournament.

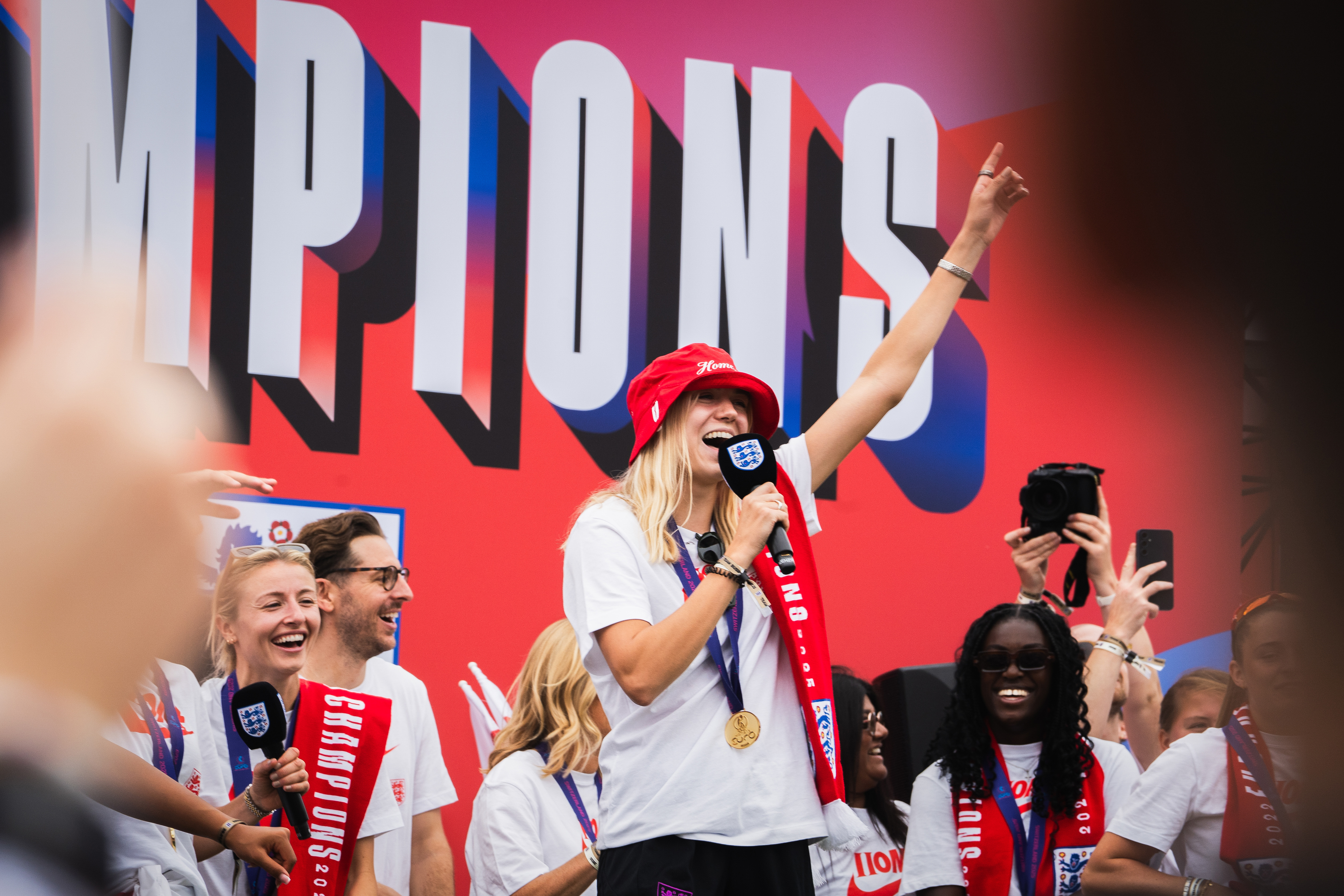
Morgan celebrating at the victory parade following England's Euro 2025 win

On 5 June 2025, she was included in the squad for UEFA Women's Euro 2025. Morgan made her major tournament debut as she came on as a substitute in the Lionesses' quarterfinal victory over Sweden. She started in England's semifinal match against Italy, and was an unused substitute in England's 1-1 (3-1 on penalties) victory over Spain in the tournament's final.

== Style of play ==
Morgan began her career in senior team as a forward, before becoming a defender. She mostly plays a centre-back, but can also play as a defensive midfielder, and has played at right-back and left-back. Her successful pass rate has reached as high as 92 percent, attributed in part to her progressive passing. She has been described as an intuitive and versatile defender who knows when to take initiative.

== Personal life ==
Although she grew up in Sheffield, South Yorkshire, Morgan had been a lifelong supporter of Manchester City before signing for The Blues in 2017. She says that she had a season ticket at the Blues since the age of three and "dreamed of playing for Manchester City" her whole life.

== Career statistics ==
=== Club ===
As of match played 4 October 2026

Appearances and goals by club, season and competition
Club	Season	League			National Cup (Note: Includes the Women's FA Cup, NWSL Challenge Cup)		League Cup (Note: Includes the Women's League Cup, NWSL Playoffs)		Continental		Other		Total	
Club	Season	Division	Apps	Goals	Apps	Goals	Apps	Goals	Apps	Goals	Apps	Goals	Apps	Goals
Manchester City	2017–18	Women's Super League	7	0	0	0	3	0	0	0	—		10	0
Manchester City	2018–19	Women's Super League	6	0	0	0	3	0	0	0	—		9	0
Manchester City	2020–21	Women's Super League	12	1	2	0	4	0	5 (Note: Appearances in UEFA Women's Champions League)	0	1	0	24	1
Manchester City	2021–22	Women's Super League	2	0	0	0	0	0	2	0	—		4	0
Manchester City	2022–23	Women's Super League	17	0	1	0	4	0	1	0	—		23	0
Manchester City	2023–24	Women's Super League	9	0	2	0	4	0	—		—		15	0
Manchester City	Club total		53	1	5	0	18	0	8	0	1	0	85	1
Everton (loan)	2019–20	Women's Super League	11	1	0	0	2	0	—		—		13	1
Washington Spirit	2024	NWSL	6	0	—		3	0	—		—		9	0
Washington Spirit	2025	NWSL	25	2	1	0	3	0	2 (Note: Appearances in CONCACAF W Champions Cup)	0	—		31	2
Washington Spirit	2026	NWSL	25	0	—		—		1	0	—		26	0
Washington Spirit	Club total		56	2	1	0	6	0	3	0	0	0	66	2
Career total			120	4	6	0	26	0	11	0	1	0	164	4

=== International ===
As of match played 9 October 2026

Appearances and goals by national team and year
National Team	Year	Apps	Goals
England	2022	3	0
England	2023	4	0
England	2024	3	0
England	2025	9	0
England	2026	7	0
Total		26	0

== Honours ==
Manchester City

- FA Women's Cup: 2019–20
- Women's League Cup: 2021–22

Washington Spirit

- NWSL Challenge Cup: 2025

England

- FIFA Women's World Cup runner-up: 2023
- UEFA Women's Championship: 2025
- Women's Finalissima: 2023
