= This Fan Girl =

This Fan Girl is an English platform and campaign for female football fans. Laura Blake and Amy Drucquer founded This Fan Girl in 2016 after a year long project that saw them take portraits of female fans at every club in the Premier League.
