= 2020 Women's FA Cup final =

English football cup final

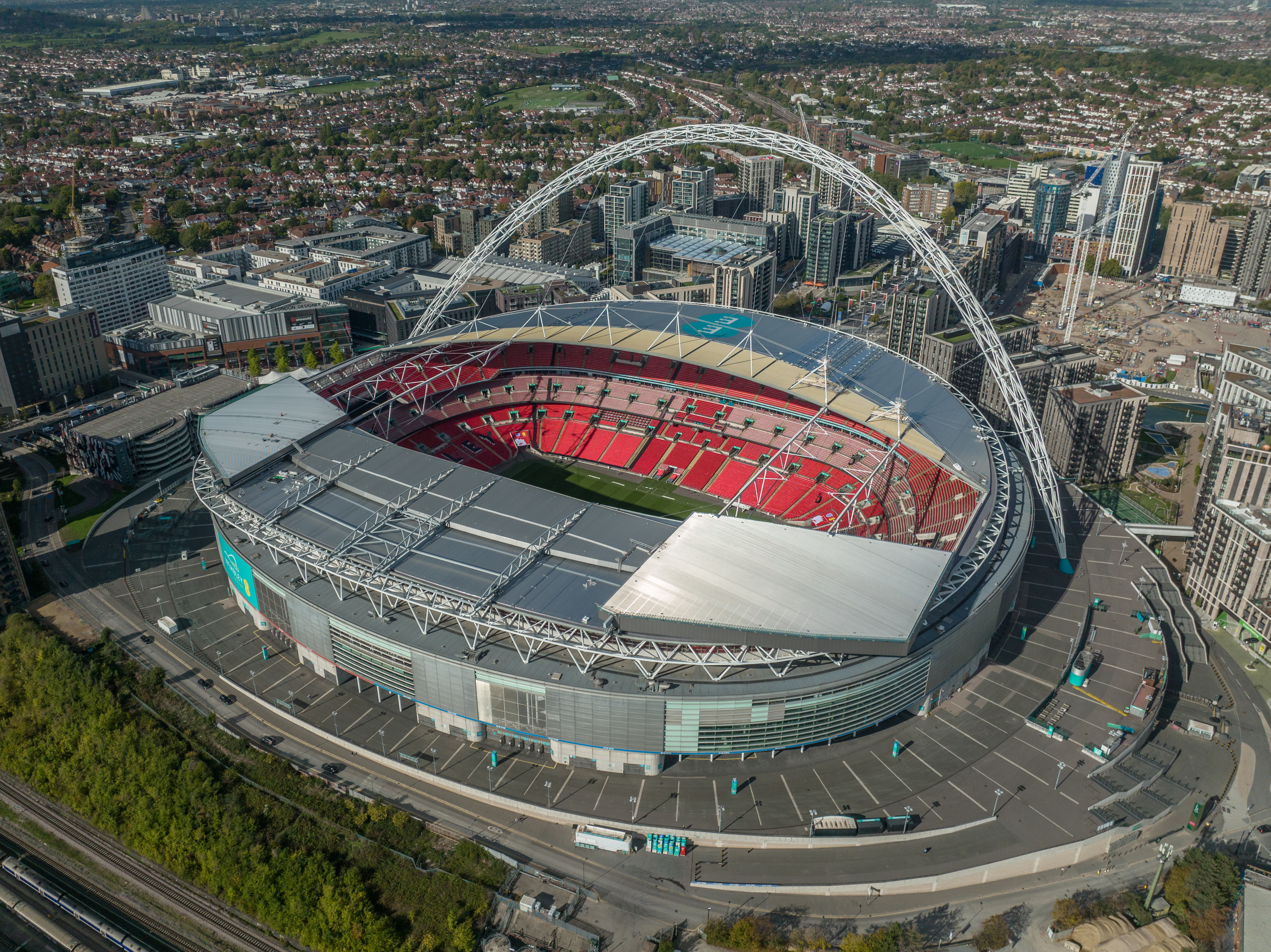
- The match took place at Wembley Stadium.
- Event: 2019–20 Women's FA Cup
Everton	Manchester City
1	3
- After extra time
- Date: 1 November 2020
- Venue: Wembley Stadium, London
- Player of the Match: Sandy MacIver (Everton)
- Referee: Rebecca Welch (Durham)
- Attendance: 0 (Behind closed doors)

The 2020 Women's FA Cup final (known as the Vitality Women's FA Cup Final for sponsorship reasons was the 50th final of the Women's FA Cup, England's primary cup competition for women's football teams. The showpiece event was the 27th to be played directly under the auspices of the Football Association (FA).

The final, contested between Everton and Manchester City, was played on Sunday 1 November 2020 at Wembley Stadium in London. It was played behind closed doors due to the COVID-19 pandemic. It was Everton's sixth appearance in the FA Cup final (including as forerunner club Leasowe Pacific) and their first since the final was moved to the national stadium having last appeared in the 2014 edition held at Stadium MK. They last won the competition in 2010. It was Manchester City's third appearance in the final having lifted the trophy on the two previous occasions in 2017 and 2019.

Manchester City won the game 3–1 in extra-time after the scores were level at 1–1 after 90 minutes. The result meant Manchester City won back to back FA Cups for the first time in their history and became the first team to successfully defend their title since Arsenal in 2014.

== 50th anniversary ==
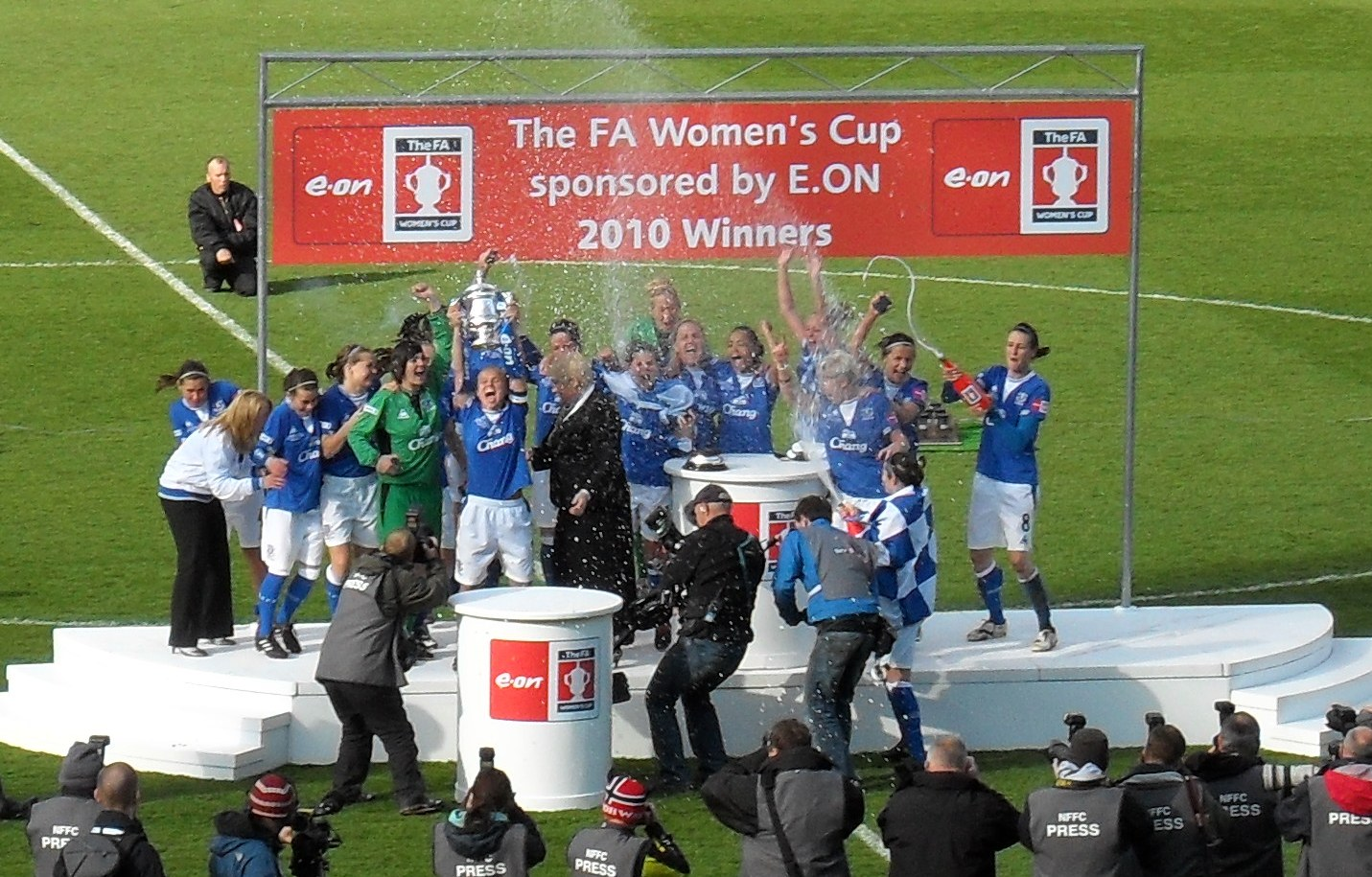
Everton celebrate their 2010 Cup win

The 2020 Cup Final is the 50th final of the competition, which was first played in 1970–71 as the WFA Cup, organised by the Women's Football Association. The 2019–20 edition was delayed for over six months by the COVID-19 pandemic, as the quarter-finals (initially scheduled for 15 March 2020) were postponed to September 2020, and the semi-finals took place on 30 September and 1 October.

The Final was rescheduled from its original date, 9 May 2020, to Saturday 31 October 2020, but this was changed for broadcasting reasons to Sunday 1 November.

By coincidence, the new date for the 50th Final also fell exactly 50 years after the Cup's first ever reported fixture, in the 1970–71 WFA Cup, in the British Newspaper Archive. This outlined upcoming matches of Lichfield team The Wandering Angels, including an away Cup game on 1 November 1970:

"And on the following Sunday the Lichfield girls visit Leicester City Supporters L.F.C. in the All British Ladies' F.A. Cup. Out of 91 ladies' football clubs throughout the [...] country, 71 have entered". – Lichfield Mercury, 23 October 1970

In the early seasons, the WFA Cup or Mitre Challenge Trophy also involved Scottish clubs. The first Cup-winners were Southampton Women's F.C. on 9 May 1971. For comparison, 300 teams from England and Wales entered the Women's FA Cup in 2019–20, including the 1971 winning club.

== Route to the final ==
=== Everton ===
Round	Opposition	Score
4th	London Bees (H)	1–0
5th	Bristol City (A)	5–0
QF	Chelsea (H)	2–1
SF	Birmingham City (A)	3–0
Key: (H) = Home venue; (A) = Away venue.

Everton were one of 23 WSL and Championship teams to enter the competition in the fourth round proper and were drawn against London Bees of the Championship to start, a tie that provided Everton with the only non-top flight opposition of their cup run. The Toffees beat the second division side 1–0 with Dutch international Inessa Kaagman scoring the only goal of the game, a 25-yard strike on the stroke of half-time. Everton were handed an away tie against Bristol City at Ashton Gate in the fifth round, a team sat bottom of the WSL and battling relegation at the time but had progressed to this stage after similarly besting Championship opposition by one goal. Everton proved comfortable 5–0 winners: Kaagman again opened the scoring, her first of two goals on the day. Esme Morgan and Lucy Graham added goals before the break with Hannah Cain and Kaagman's second giving Everton their biggest margin of victory since a 6–1 FA Cup quarter-final victory over second-tier Durham in March 2018. A home quarter-final tie against Chelsea, a team in the midst of a title challenge having already lifted one trophy this season by beating Arsenal in the 2020 FA Women's League Cup Final in their previous match, was scheduled for 15 March 2020. However, it was postponed indefinitely due to the coronavirus pandemic. With the 2019–20 FA WSL season eventually curtailed and decided on a points-per-game basis, the FA Cup was permitted to resume at the quarter-final stage six months later than planned. Everton ultimately faced newly-crowned WSL champions Chelsea on 27 September 2020 having already played two matches of the 2020–21 season. The game was played behind closed doors at Goodison Park with Erin Cuthbert giving the visitors an early lead in the 5th minute, the only goal the Toffees would end up conceding en route to the final. Everton went in level at the break through a 40th-minute Lucy Graham goal before French international Valérie Gauvin, a high-profile summer signing from Montpellier, scored the decisive goal just past the hour mark, ending the London side's hopes of a domestic treble. Three days later, Everton booked their place at Wembley with a 3–0 victory away at Birmingham City, a team undergoing a sizeable rebuild having lost eight senior players over the summer and under new management with Carla Ward. Everton's Nicoline Sørensen, another of the club's international summer recruits, scored her first goal for the club in the game.

=== Manchester City ===
Round	Opposition	Score
4th	Manchester United (A)	3–2
5th	Ipswich Town (H)	10–0
QF	Leicester City (A)	2–1
SF	Arsenal (H)	2–1
Key: (H) = Home venue; (A) = Away venue.

Manchester City were one of 23 WSL and Championship teams to enter the competition in the fourth round proper and were drawn against Manchester derby rivals Manchester United having already met twice earlier in the year: City had triumphed on the opening day of the season before United earned a League Cup group stage win. The game was selected as the televised match of the round and broadcast live on the BBC Red Button. City won a five-goal thriller 3–2 with a brace from England international Ellen White putting the away side ahead. Substitute Lauren James pulled one back for United in the 69th-minute and the Red Devils thought they had drawn level when former City player Abbie McManus saw her shot trickle over the line but the officials disagreed, putting the lack of goal-line technology in women's football under scrutiny. Jill Scott restored City's two-goal cushion shortly after while a Lauren Hemp own goal two minutes from time set up a nervy finish. The fifth round paired the defending FA Cup champions in a favourable matchup against Ipswich Town of the FA Women's National League Division One South East (tier 4), the lowest ranked team left in the competition who had entered during second round qualifying and won six games to reach this stage. Pauline Bremer, Jess Park and Georgia Stanway all scored hat-tricks as City ran out resounding 10–0 winners. Reaching the quarter-final stage for the seventh consecutive season, City were drawn against Championship side Leicester City. With the season postponed due to the coronavirus pandemic the 2019–20 FA WSL season was eventually curtailed and decided on a points-per-game basis, moving City down from 1st to 2nd in the process as Chelsea were declared WSL champions. Despite this, the FA Cup was permitted to resume at the quarter-final stage six months later than planned with opponents Leicester City having transitioned from semi-professional to full-time during the offseason layoff. Manchester City, meanwhile, had appointed Gareth Taylor as manager ahead of the new season on 28 May following the departure of Nick Cushing during the previous campaign. Despite the increased investment and influx of WSL talent to the new-look Leicester team, the Cityzens were able to see off the Foxes 2–1. Chloe Kelly, who had joined the Manchester club from Everton over summer, scored her first goal as a City player from the penalty spot to open scoring with Georgia Stanway doubling the lead before half-time. Leicester earned a penalty of their own in the 78th-minute, converted by Charlie Devlin, but City were again able to see out the win to set up a semi-final meeting with Arsenal. The teams had already met at the semi-final stage of the 2019–20 FA Women's League Cup earlier in the year with the Gunners emerging 2–1 winners. City were able to reverse the scoreline in this rematch: England international teammates Steph Houghton and Jordan Nobbs traded first-half goals before Sam Mewis, City's reigning World Cup champion midfielder acquired from North Carolina Courage in August, scored her first goal in English football to clinch the defending champions' place in the final.

== Match details ==
1 November 2020
14:30 BST

Everton	1–3 (a.e.t.)	Manchester City
Gauvin 60'	Report	Mewis 40'; Stanway 111'; Beckie 120+2'

Wembley Stadium, London
Attendance: 0 (Note: The final was played behind closed doors due to the COVID-19 pandemic in the United Kingdom.)
Referee: Rebecca Welch (Durham)

Everton	Manchester City

GK	1	(England) Sandy MacIver
RB	2	(Norway) Ingrid Moe Wold
CB	20	(England) Megan Finnigan
CB	22	(Denmark) Rikke Sevecke		(substituted off) 90'
LB	3	(England) Danielle Turner
CM	17	(Scotland) Lucy Graham (c)		(substituted off) 90+2'
CM	12	(Spain) Damaris Egurrola		(substituted off) 99'
RW	16	(Australia) Hayley Raso	(yellow card) 25'	(substituted off) 76'
AM	8	(England) Izzy Christiansen
LW	14	(Denmark) Nicoline Sørensen
ST	19	(France) Valérie Gauvin		(substituted off) 90'
Substitutes:
GK	23	(Finland) Tinja-Riikka Korpela
FW	7	(England) Chantelle Boye-Hlorkah		(substituted on) 76'
FW	10	(Northern Ireland) Simone Magill		(substituted on) 90'
MF	13	(England) Abbey-Leigh Stringer		(substituted on) 99'
MF	15	(England) Molly Pike		(substituted on) 90+2'
MF	21	(France) Maéva Clemaron
MF	26	(England) Grace Clinton
DF	30	(England) Poppy Pattinson		(substituted on) 90'
Manager:
(Scotland) Willie Kirk

GK	26	(England) Ellie Roebuck
RB	20	(England) Lucy Bronze	(yellow card) 16'
CB	6	(England) Steph Houghton (c)
CB	27	(England) Alex Greenwood
LB	3	(England) Demi Stokes
CM	22	(United States) Sam Mewis
CM	24	(England) Keira Walsh
CM	19	(Scotland) Caroline Weir
FW	9	(England) Chloe Kelly		(substituted off) 118'
FW	18	(England) Ellen White		(substituted off) 63'
FW	21	(United States) Rose Lavelle		(substituted off) 70'
Substitutes:
GK	1	(England) Karen Bardsley
GK	34	(France) Karima Benameur Taieb
EF	4	(England) Gemma Bonner
MF	7	(England) Laura Coombs
MF	8	(England) Jill Scott
FW	10	(England) Georgia Stanway	(yellow card) 82'	(substituted on) 63'
FW	11	(Canada) Janine Beckie		(substituted on) 118'
DF	14	(England) Esme Morgan
FW	16	(England) Jess Park		(substituted on) 70'
Manager:
(Wales) Gareth Taylor

Player of the match
Sandy MacIver (Everton)

Assistant referees:
Sian Massey-Ellis (Birmingham)
Natalie Aspinall (Lancashire)
Fourth official:
Abigail Byrne (Suffolk)

Match rules

- 90 minutes.
- 30 minutes of extra-time if necessary.
- Penalty shoot-out if scores still level.
- Nine named substitutes.
- Maximum of five substitutions in three stoppages.
