= 2014 FA Women's Cup final =

English football cup final

- The match programme cover
- Event: 2013–14 FA Women's Cup
Arsenal	Everton
2	0
- Date: 1 June 2014
- Venue: stadium:mk, Milton Keynes
- Player of the Match: Kelly Smith (Arsenal)
- Referee: Martin Atkinson (West Riding)
- Attendance: 15,098

The 2014 FA Women's Cup final was the 44th final of the FA Women's Cup, England's primary cup competition for women's football teams. The showpiece event was the 21st to be played directly under the auspices of the Football Association (FA). The final was contested between Arsenal and Everton on 1 June 2014 at stadium:mk in Milton Keynes. This was the last cup final held outside Wembley Stadium. Holders Arsenal made its 14th final appearance, after winning the 2013 final. Everton was appearing in its fifth final.

As FA WSL 1 clubs, both teams entered the competition at the fifth round stage. Arsenal beat Gillingham (2–0), Birmingham City (2–1) and Chelsea (5–3) to reach the final. Everton defeated Cardiff City (3–1), Liverpool (2–0) and Notts County (2–1).

The victory gave Arsenal a rare FA Cup double with the men's team winning the final two weeks before, a feat they accomplished for the third time (also in 1993 and 1998).

== Match details ==
1 June 2014
15:00 BST

Arsenal	2–0	Everton
Smith 15'; Kinga 61'	Report

stadium:mk, Milton Keynes
Attendance: 15,098
Referee: Martin Atkinson (West Riding)

Arsenal	Everton

GK	1	(Republic of Ireland) Emma Byrne
DF	2	(England) Alex Scott
DF	5	(England) Casey Stoney
DF	19	(Republic of Ireland) Niamh Fahey
DF	3	(Scotland) Emma Mitchell
MF	9	(England) Danielle Carter
MF	25	(England) Jade Bailey	(substituted off) 76'
MF	4	(Japan) Yukari Kinga
MF	11	(England) Rachel Yankey
FW	10	(England) Kelly Smith (c)
FW	7	(Japan) Shinobu Ohno
Substitutes:
GK	15	(England) Siobhan Chamberlain
MF	14	(England) Leah Williamson	(substituted on) 76'
MF	16	(Scotland) Christie Murray
MF	20	(Scotland) Caroline Weir
FW	24	(England) Freda Ayisi
Manager:
(Scotland) Shelley Kerr

GK	1	(England) Rachel Brown
DF	2	(England) Vicky Jones	(substituted off) 62'
DF	6	(England) Lindsay Johnson
DF	23	(England) Gabby George
DF	3	(England) Alex Greenwood
CM	14	(England) Danielle Turner	(substituted off) 82'
CM	4	(England) Brooke Chaplen
RW	11	(England) Kelly Jones
CAM	8	(England) Michelle Hinnigan (c)
LW	24	(England) Millie Turner	(substituted off) 71'
FW	9	(England) Nikita Parris
Substitutes:
GK	25	(Republic of Ireland) Megan Walsh
DF	5	(England) Fern Whelan	(substituted on) 82'
FW	10	(Northern Ireland) Simone Magill	(substituted on) 71'
MF	19	(England) Lucy Whipp
DF	22	(England) Billie Murphy	(substituted on) 62'
Manager:
(England) Andy Spence

Player of the match
Kelly Smith (Arsenal)

Assistant referees:
Lindsey Robinson
Mark Dwyer
Fourth official:
Rebecca Welch (Durham)

Match rules

- 90 minutes.
- 30 minutes of extra-time if necessary.
- Penalty shoot-out if scores still level.
- Five named substitutes.
- Maximum of three substitutions.
