= 2017 Women's FA Cup final =

English football cup final

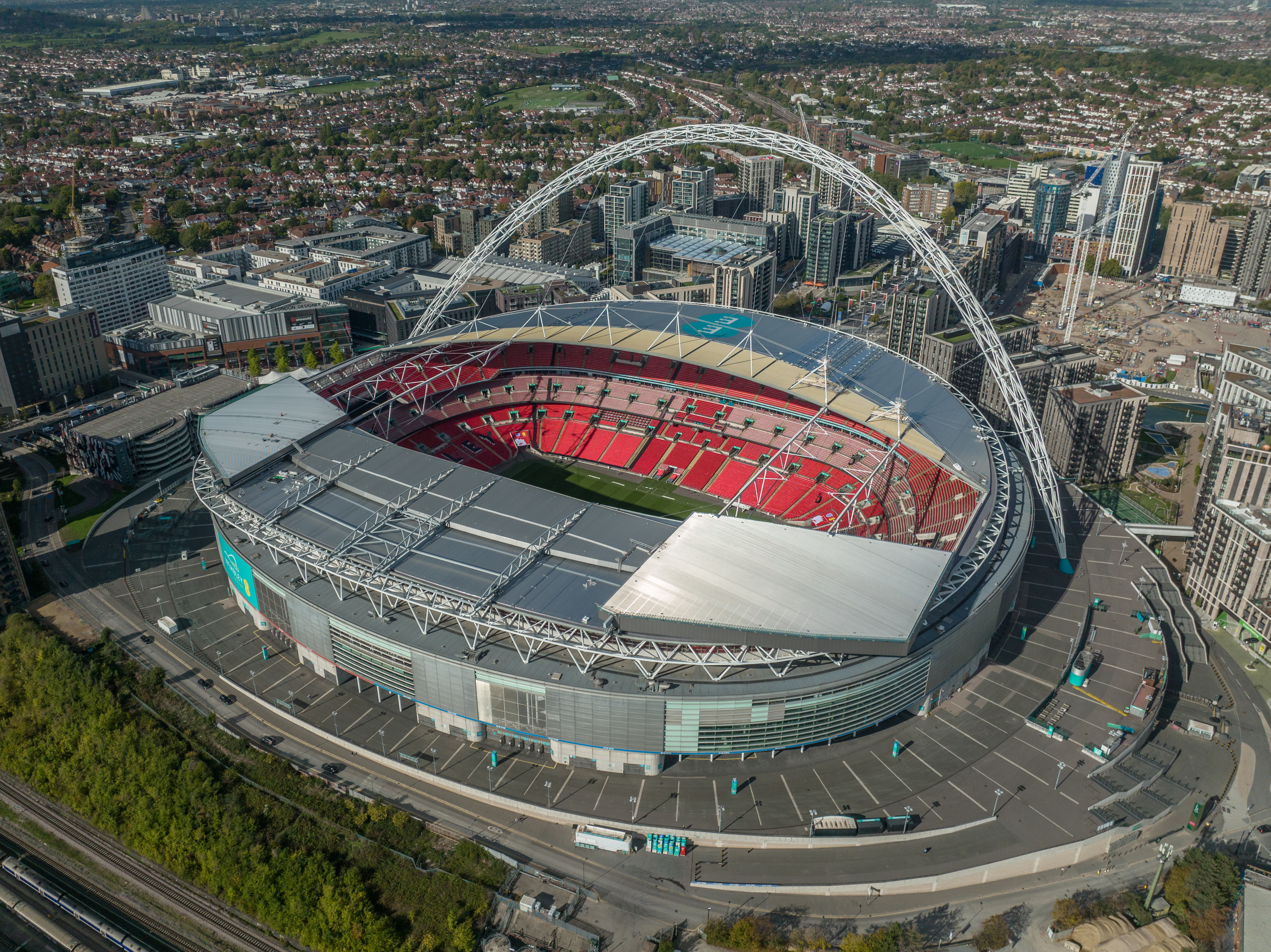
- The match took place at Wembley Stadium.
- Event: 2016–17 Women's FA Cup
Birmingham City	Manchester City
1	4
- Date: 13 May 2017
- Venue: Wembley Stadium, London
- Player of the Match: Keira Walsh (Manchester City)
- Referee: Rebecca Welch (Durham)
- Attendance: 35,271

The 2017 Women's FA Cup final was the 47th final of the FA Women's Cup, England's primary cup competition for women's football teams. The showpiece event was the 24th to be played directly under the auspices of the Football Association (FA) and was named the SSE Women's FA Cup Final for sponsorship reasons. The final was contested between Birmingham City Ladies and Manchester City Ladies on 13 May 2017 at Wembley Stadium in London. The match was the third FA Women's Cup Final to be held at Wembley and attracted a record crowd (35,271) for a Women's Cup final.

== Match details ==
13 May 2017
17:15 BST

Birmingham City	1–4	Manchester City
Wellings 73'	Report	Bronze 18'; Christiansen 25'; Lloyd 32'; Scott 80'

Wembley Stadium, London
Attendance: 35,271
Referee: Rebecca Welch (Durham)

Birmingham City	Manchester City

GK	30	(Germany) Ann-Katrin Berger
DF	6	(England) Kerys Harrop (c)
DF	25	(England) Aoife Mannion
DF	3	(Wales) Meaghan Sargeant
DF	8	(England) Sarah Mayling
MF	4	(England) Jess Carter
MF	11	(Norway) Andrine Hegerberg	(substituted off) 83'
MF	2	(England) Paige Williams	(substituted off) 87'
MF	9	(England) Ellen White
FW	7	(Republic of Ireland) Freda Ayisi	(substituted off) 64'
FW	27	(England) Ellie Brazil
Substitutes:
MF	16	(England) Chloe Peplow	(substituted on) 83'
MF	12	(England) Abbey-Leigh Stringer	(substituted on) 87'
FW	15	(England) Charlie Wellings	(substituted on) 64'
GK	1	(England) Sophie Baggaley
MF	19	(England) Emily Westwood
Manager:
(England) Marc Skinner

GK	1	(England) Karen Bardsley
DF	2	(England) Lucy Bronze
DF	6	(England) Steph Houghton (c)
DF	20	(Republic of Ireland) Megan Campbell	(substituted off) 78'
DF	3	(England) Demi Stokes
MF	8	(England) Jill Scott
MF	24	(England) Keira Walsh
MF	11	(England) Izzy Christiansen
MF	17	(England) Nikita Parris	(substituted off) 70'
FW	10	(United States) Carli Lloyd
FW	14	(England) Melissa Lawley	(substituted off) 56'
Substitutes:
DF	23	(England) Abbie McManus	(substituted on) 78'
MF	12	(England) Georgia Stanway	(substituted on) 70'
MF	9	(England) Toni Duggan	(substituted on) 56'
GK	21	(Republic of Ireland) Marie Hourihan
DF	5	(Scotland) Jen Beattie
Manager:
(England) Nick Cushing

Player of the match
Keira Walsh (Manchester City)

Assistant referees:
Helen Byrne
Abigail Marriott
Fourth official:
Helen Conley

Match rules

- 90 minutes.
- 30 minutes of extra-time if necessary.
- Penalty shoot-out if scores still level.
- Five named substitutes.
- Maximum of three substitutions.
